= 2015–16 FC Steaua București season =

Steaua București
2015–16 season
- Owner: George Becali
- President: Valeriu Argăseală
- Head coach: Massimo Pedrazzini; Dumitru Dumitriu; Laurențiu Reghecampf
- Stadium: Arena Națională
- Liga I: 2nd
- Cupa României: Semi-finals
- Cupa Ligii: Winners
- Supercupa României: Runners-up
- Champions League: Third qualifying round
- Europa League: Play-off round
- Top goalscorer: League: Nicolae Stanciu (12); All: Nicolae Stanciu (14)
- Highest home attendance: 48,613 vs Dinamo București (10 April 2016)
- Lowest home attendance: 500 (approximate) vs Poli Timișoara (15 October 2015)
Home colours	Away colours

The 2015–16 season was the 68th season in the existence of FC Steaua București and the club's 68th consecutive season in the top flight of Romanian football. In addition to the domestic league, Steaua București participated in this season's edition of the Cupa României, the Cupa Ligii, the Supercupa României, the UEFA Champions League and the UEFA Europa League.

== Players ==
=== First-team squad ===
Note: Flags indicate national team as defined under FIFA eligibility rules; some limited exceptions apply. Players may hold more than one non-FIFA nationality.

No.	Pos.	Nation	Player
1	GK	ROU	Florin Niță
2	DF	ROU	Cornel Râpă
3	DF	ROU	Paul Papp
4	DF	MDA	Cătălin Carp
5	MF	ALG	Jugurtha Hamroun
6	MF	ROU	Mihai Pintilii
7	MF	ROU	Alexandru Chipciu (vice-captain)
8	MF	ROU	Lucian Filip
9	FW	ROU	Ciprian Marica
10	MF	ROU	Nicolae Stanciu (3rd captain)
11	MF	GHA	Sulley Muniru
12	GK	ROU	Valentin Cojocaru
13	DF	ROU	Alin Toșca
14	MF	MAR	Houssine Kharja

No.	Pos.	Nation	Player
15	DF	SRB	Marko Momčilović
18	MF	GER	Timo Gebhart
19	MF	ROU	Vlad Mihalcea
20	FW	JOR	Tha'er Bawab
25	FW	FRA	Grégory Tadé
27	FW	ROU	Cristian Onțel
30	DF	ROU	Gabriel Tamaș
33	DF	CPV	Fernando Varela (captain)
44	MF	ROU	Gabriel Enache
55	MF	ROU	Alexandru Bourceanu
77	MF	ROU	Adrian Popa
95	MF	ROU	Doru Popadiuc
98	GK	ROU	Ionuț Poiană

==== Youth players with first-team appearances ====
Note: Flags indicate national team as defined under FIFA eligibility rules; some limited exceptions apply. Players may hold more than one non-FIFA nationality.

No. / Pos. / Nation / Player; 29 / FW / ROU / Bogdan Măcriș	No. / Pos. / Nation / Player

==== Out of team ====
Note: Flags indicate national team as defined under FIFA eligibility rules; some limited exceptions apply. Players may hold more than one non-FIFA nationality.

No. / Pos. / Nation / Player; 21 / MF / NED / Nicandro Breeveld	No. / Pos. / Nation / Player; — / DF / ROU / Valeriu Lupu

===== Notes =====
During the season Jugurtha Hamroun used two numbers, 14 in European Cups and 5 in Liga I.

=== Transfers ===
==== In ====
No.	Pos.	Nat.	Name	Age	EU	Moving from	Type	Transfer window	Ends	Transfer fee	Source
—	DF	(Romania)	Gabriel Matei	25	EU	Brașov	Loan return	Summer	Undisclosed	—	
—	MF	(Romania)	Paul Pârvulescu	26	EU	Viitorul Constanța	Loan return	Summer	2017	—	
27	MF	(Romania)	Răzvan Grădinaru	19	EU	Oțelul Galați	Loan return	Summer	Undisclosed	—	
28	FW	(Romania)	Alexandru Târnovan	19	EU	Gaz Metan Mediaș	Loan return	Summer	Undisclosed	—	
35	DF	(Romania)	Alexandru Aldea (footballer)	20	EU	Ceahlăul Piatra Neamț	Loan return	Summer	Undisclosed	—	
98	GK	(Romania)	Ionuț Poiană	17	EU	Youth system	Promoted	Summer	Undisclosed	—	
22	DF	(Haiti)	Jean Sony Alcénat	29	Non-EU	Petrolul Ploiești	Free transfer	Summer	2018	Free	SteauaFC.com
11	MF	(Ghana)	Sulley Muniru	22	Non-EU	CFR Cluj	Transfer	Summer	2019	Undisclosed	SteauaFC.com
19	MF	(Romania)	Vlad Mihalcea	16	EU	Brașov	Transfer	Summer	2021	Undisclosed	Steaua Facebook
17	FW	(Romania)	Alexandru Tudorie	19	EU	Oțelul Galați	Transfer	Summer	2020	Undisclosed	SteauaFC.com
23	MF	(England) (Algeria)	Aymen Tahar	25	EU	Gaz Metan Mediaș	Transfer	Summer	2019	Undisclosed	SteauaFC.com
14	MF	(France) (Algeria)	Jugurtha Hamroun	26	EU	Oțelul Galați	Free transfer	Summer	2020	Free	SteauaFC.com
15	FW	(France)	Grégory Tadé	28	EU	CFR Cluj	Transfer	Summer	2018	Undisclosed	SteauaFC.com
4	DF	(Romania) (Moldova)	Cătălin Carp	21	EU	CFR Cluj	Free transfer	Summer	2019	Free	SteauaFC.com
14	MF	(France) (Morocco)	Houssine Kharja	32	EU	Sochaux (France)	Free transfer	Summer	2016	Free	SteauaFC.com
41	MF	(Romania)	Cătălin Ștefănescu	21	EU	Ceahlăul Piatra Neamț	Transfer	Winter	2020	Undisclosed	
95	MF	(Romania)	Doru Popadiuc	20	EU	Ceahlăul Piatra Neamț	Transfer	Winter	2020	Undisclosed	
92	MF	(Romania)	Sebastian Chitoșcă	23	EU	Ceahlăul Piatra Neamț	Transfer	Winter	2020	Undisclosed	
55	MF	(Romania)	Alexandru Bourceanu	30	EU	Trabzonspor (Turkey)	Free transfer	Winter	2016	Free	SteauaFC.com
6	MF	(Romania)	Mihai Pintilii	31	EU	Hapoel Tel Aviv (Israel)	Transfer	Winter	2017	Undisclosed	SteauaFC.com
22	MF	(Romania)	Paul Pârvulescu	27	EU	Voluntari	Loan return	Winter	2017	—	
15	DF	(Serbia)	Marko Momčilović	28	Non-EU	Pandurii Târgu Jiu	Transfer	Winter	2018	Undisclosed	SteauaFC.com
9	FW	(Romania)	Ciprian Marica	30	EU	Konyaspor (Turkey)	Free transfer	Winter	2016	Free	SteauaFC.com
20	FW	(Spain) (Jordan)	Tha'er Bawab	30	EU	CS Universitatea Craiova	Free transfer	Winter	2017	Free	SteauaFC.com
18	MF	(Germany)	Timo Gebhart	26	EU	1. FC Nürnberg (Germany)	Free transfer	Winter	2016	Free	SteauaFC.com
30	DF	(Romania)	Gabriel Tamaș	32	EU	Cardiff City (Wales)	Free transfer	Winter	2018	Free	SteauaFC.com
44	MF	(Romania)	Gabriel Enache	25	EU	Astra Giurgiu	Transfer	Winter	2020	€ 500.000	SteauaFC.com

==== Out ====
No.	Pos.	Nat.	Name	Age	EU	Moving to	Type	Transfer window	Transfer fee	Source
24	GK	(Lithuania)	Giedrius Arlauskis	27	EU	Watford (England)	End of contract	Summer	Free	WatfordFC.com
11	MF	(Romania)	Andrei Prepeliță	29	EU	Ludogorets Razgrad (Bulgaria)	End of contract	Summer	Free	SteauaFC.com
14	DF	(Romania)	Iasmin Latovlevici	29	EU	Gençlerbirliği (Turkey)	End of contract	Summer	Free	SteauaFC.com
25	FW	(Romania)	Raul Rusescu	26	EU	Sevilla (Spain)	End of loan	Summer	—	SteauaFC.com
55	MF	(Romania)	Alexandru Bourceanu	30	EU	Trabzonspor (Turkey)	End of loan	Summer	—	SteauaFC.com
—	DF	(Romania)	Paul Pârvulescu	26	EU	Voluntari	Loan	Summer	Undisclosed	SteauaFC.com
97	MF	(Romania)	Robert Vâlceanu	18	EU	Voluntari	Loan	Summer	Undisclosed	
10	MF	(Romania)	Cristian Tănase	28	EU	Tianjin TEDA (China)	Transfer	Summer	€ 1.000.000	SteauaFC.com
31	MF	(Romania)	Florentin Pham	18	EU	Academica Clinceni	Loan	Summer	Undisclosed	
—	DF	(Romania)	Srdjan Luchin	29	EU	ACS Poli Timișoara	Mutual termination	Summer	Free	SteauaFC.com
30	DF	(Romania)	Gabriel Tamaș	31	EU	Cardiff City (Wales)	Mutual termination	Summer	Free	SteauaFC.com
26	MF	(Romania)	Ionuț Neagu	25	EU	Kardemir Karabükspor (Turkey)	Loan with transfer option	Summer	Undisclosed	SteauaFC.com
80	FW	(Romania)	Gabriel Iancu	21	EU	Kardemir Karabükspor (Turkey)	Loan with transfer option	Summer	Undisclosed	SteauaFC.com
27	MF	(Romania)	Răzvan Grădinaru	20	EU	Concordia Chiajna	Loan	Summer	Undisclosed	SteauaFC.com
—	DF	(Romania)	Gabriel Matei	25	EU	Academica Clinceni	Mutual termination	Summer	Free	SteauaFC.com
29	FW	(Romania)	George Țucudean	24	EU	Charlton Athletic (England)	End of loan	Summer	—	SteauaFC.com
16	DF	(Portugal) (Brazil)	Guilherme Sityá	25	EU		Mutual termination	Winter	Free	SteauaFC.com
23	MF	(England) (Algeria)	Aymen Tahar	26	EU	Boavista (Portugal)	Loan	Winter	Undisclosed	SteauaFC.com
17	FW	(Romania)	Alexandru Tudorie	19	EU	Voluntari	Loan	Winter	Undisclosed	SteauaFC.com
94	MF	(Romania)	Rareș Enceanu	21	EU	Voluntari	Loan	Winter	Undisclosed	SteauaFC.com
41	MF	(Romania)	Cătălin Ștefănescu	21	EU	Voluntari	Loan	Winter	Undisclosed	SteauaFC.com
28	FW	(Romania)	Alexandru Târnovan	20	EU	Universitatea Cluj	Loan	Winter	Undisclosed	SteauaFC.com
—	DF	(Haiti)	Jean Sony Alcénat	30	EU	Voluntari	Loan	Winter	Undisclosed	SteauaFC.com
22	DF	(Romania)	Paul Pîrvulescu	27	EU	Târgu Mureș	Loan	Winter	Undisclosed	SteauaFC.com
92	MF	(Romania)	Sebastian Chitoșcă	23	EU	Voluntari	Loan	Winter	Undisclosed	
35	DF	(Romania)	Alexandru Aldea (footballer)	20	EU	Sporting Turnu Măgurele	Loan	Winter	Undisclosed	

== Statistics ==
=== Goalscorers ===
Last updated on 17 July 2016

Player	Liga I	Cupa României	Cupa Ligii	Supercupa României	Champions League	Europa League	Total
(Romania) Nicolae Stanciu	12	1	0	0	1	0	14
(Algeria) Jugurtha Hamroun	7	0	1	0	2	0	10
(Romania) Alexandru Chipciu	7	1	1	0	0	0	9
(France) Grégory Tadé	4	1	1	0	1	0	7
(Romania) Adrian Popa	4	0	0	0	0	1	5
(Cape Verde) Fernando Varela	3	0	0	0	1	0	4
(Ghana) Sulley Muniru	1	0	0	0	2	0	3
(Algeria) Aymen Tahar	1	1	0	0	0	0	2
(Romania) Gabriel Enache	1	1	0	0	0	0	2
(Serbia) Marko Momčilović	1	0	1	0	0	0	2
(Jordan) Tha'er Bawab	0	0	2	0	0	0	2
(Romania) Alexandru Tudorie	1	0	0	0	0	0	1
(Romania) Gabriel Iancu	1	0	0	0	0	0	1
(Netherlands) Nicandro Breeveld	1	0	0	0	0	0	1
(Romania) Cornel Râpă	1	0	0	0	0	0	1
(Romania) Lucian Filip	1	0	0	0	0	0	1
(Romania) Paul Papp	1	0	0	0	0	0	1
(Romania) Doru Popadiuc	1	0	0	0	0	0	1
(Romania) Cristian Onțel	1	0	0	0	0	0	1
Own goals
(Romania) Cristian Bocșan	1	0	0	0	0	0	1
(Spain) Iván González	1	0	0	0	0	0	1
(Romania) Steliano Filip	1	0	0	0	0	0	1

== Competitions ==
=== Supercupa României ===
==== Results ====
8 July 2015 Final	Steaua București	0–1	Târgu Mureș	Constanţa
21:00 EET (UTC+02)		Report	Axente 63'	Stadium: Farul

=== Liga I ===
==== Regular season ====
Overall								Home						Away					
Pld	W	D	L	GF	GA	GD	Pts	W	D	L	GF	GA	GD	W	D	L	GF	GA	GD
26	12	8	6	35	25	+10	44	6	6	1	21	11	+10	6	2	5	14	14	0

Source: FCSB

===== Table =====
Pos	Team	Pld	W	D	L	GF	GA	GD	Pts	Qualification
3	Pandurii Târgu Jiu	26	13	8	5	35	26	+9	47	Qualification for the championship round
4	Viitorul Constanța	26	13	7	6	49	30	+19	46	Qualification for the championship round
5	Steaua București	26	12	8	6	35	25	+10	44	Qualification for the championship round
6	Târgu Mureș	26	9	11	6	27	21	+6	38	Qualification for the championship round
7	CSMS Iași	26	9	10	7	22	25	−3	37	Qualification for the relegation round

Source: Liga 1, Soccerway
Rules for classification: 1) Points; 2) Head-to-head points; 3) Head-to-head goal difference; 4) Head-to-head goals scored; 5) Goal difference; 6) Goals scored; 7) Play-off.

===== Position by round =====
Round	1	2	3	4	5	6	7	8	9	10	11	12	13	14	15	16	17	18	19	20	21	22	23	24	25	26
Ground	H	AR	H	A	H	A	H	A	H	A	H	H	A	A	H	A	HR	A	HR	AR	HR	A	HR	A	A	HR
Result	D	W	D	W	D	L	D	W	W	L	W	W	W	D	D	L	W	L	L	D	W	W	W	W	L	D
Position	7	2	3	2	2	6	6	5	5	5	3	3	2	3	3	4	3	4	5	5	5	5	4	4	5	5

Source: Matches
A = Away; H = Home; W = Win; D = Draw; L = Loss

===== Results =====
11 July 2015 Round 1	Steaua București	0–0	Petrolul Ploiești	Bucharest
21:00 EET (UTC+02)		Report		Stadium: Arena Națională; Attendance: 5,501; Referee: Ovidiu Hațegan; Assistant referees: Octavian Șovre, Mircea Orbuleț; Fourth official: Adrian Comanescu

18 July 2015 Round 2	Pandurii Târgu Jiu	0–3	Steaua București	Drobeta-Turnu Severin
21:00 EET (UTC+02)			Chipciu 28', 51'; Hamroun 64'	Stadium: Municipal; Attendance: 12,800 (approximate); Referee: Marius Avram; Assistant referees: Vasile Marinescu, Daniel Mitruți; Fourth official: Denis Haidiner

25 July 2015 Round 3	Steaua București	1–1	CFR Cluj	Bucharest
21:00 EET (UTC+02)	Tudorie 57'		Lopes 16'	Stadium: Arena Națională; Attendance: 5,500 (approximate); Referee: Cristian Balaj; Assistant referees: Vladimir Urzică, Aurel Oniță; Fourth official: Dragoș Istrate

1 August 2015 Round 4	Botoșani	0–1	Steaua București	Botoșani
21:00 EET (UTC+02)			Iancu 2'	Stadium: Municipal; Attendance: 7,000 (approximate); Referee: Alexandru Tudor; Assistant referees: Sebastian Gheorghe, Florin Păunescu; Fourth official: Dan Botescu

9 August 2015 Round 5	Steaua București	0–0	Dinamo București	Bucharest
21:00 EET (UTC+02)				Stadium: Arena Națională; Attendance: 27,252; Referee: Ovidiu Hațegan; Assistant referees: Vasile Marinescu, Radu Ghinguleac; Fourth official: Dragoș Istrate

12 August 2015 Round 6	Astra Giurgiu	2–0	Steaua București	Giurgiu
21:45 EET (UTC+02)	Alibec 51'; Budescu 61'			Stadium: Marin AnastasovicI; Attendance: 8,500 (approximate); Referee: Sebastian Colțescu; Assistant referees: Mircea Grigoriu, Sebastian Stoianov; Fourth official: Lucian Rusandu

15 August 2015 Round 7	Steaua București	1–1	Târgu Mureș	Bucharest
21:00 EET (UTC+02)	Popa 31'		Jazvić 54'	Stadium: Arena Națională; Attendance: 3,000 (approximate); Referee: Radu Petrescu; Assistant referees: Ovidiu Artene, Aurel Oniță; Fourth official: Adrian Cojocaru

23 August 2015 Round 8	Universitatea Craiova	1–2	Steaua București	Craiova
18:00 EET (UTC+02)	Vătăjelu 39' (pen.)		Stanciu 18'; Tadé 85' (pen.)	Stadium: Extensiv; Attendance: 6,000 (approximate); Referee: Adrian Comănescu; Assistant referees: Vladimir Urzică, Radu Ghinguleac; Fourth official: Marian Balaci

30 August 2015 Round 9	Steaua București	1–0	Viitorul	Bucharest
21:00 EET (UTC+02)	Stanciu 20'			Stadium: Arena Națională; Attendance: 4,536; Referee: Cătălin Popa; Assistant referees: Sebastian Gheorghe, Valentin Avram; Fourth official: Iulian Călin

13 September 2015 Round 10	Poli Timișoara	1–0	Steaua București	Timișoara
21:00 EET (UTC+02)	Hernández 88'			Stadium: Dan Păltinișanu; Attendance: 20,000 (approximate); Referee: George Găman; Assistant referees: Vladimir Urzică, Alexandru Cerei; Fourth official: Marius Avram

21 September 2015 Round 11	Steaua București	3–1	Concordia Chiajna	Bucharest
21:00 EET (UTC+02)	Varela 5'; Stanciu 25' (pen.); Chipciu 43'		Lazăr 90+4'	Stadium: Arena Națională; Attendance: 1,500 (approximate); Referee: Horațiu Feșnic; Assistant referees: Andrei Constantinescu, Bogdan Gheorghe; Fourth official: Ionuț Coza

27 September 2015 Round 12	Steaua Bucuresti	3–1	Voluntari	Bucharest
21:00 EET (UTC+02)	Hamroun 8'; Chipciu 44'; Stanciu 66' (pen.)		Goossens 69'	Stadium: Arena Națională; Attendance: 3,362; Referee: Adrian Cojocaru; Assistant referees: Mircea Orbuleț, Dragoș Iliescu; Fourth official: Florin Marcu

3 October 2015 Round 13	CSMS Iași	1–2	Steaua Bucuresti	Iași
21:00 EET (UTC+02)	Gheorghe 90+1'		Chipciu 48'; Tahar 79'	Stadium: Emil Alexandrescu; Attendance: 6,500 (approximate); Referee: Cristian Balaj; Assistant referees: Aurel Oniță, Ciprian Danșa; Fourth official: Florin Mazilu

18 October 2015 Round 14	Petrolul Ploiești	0–0	Steaua Bucuresti	Ploiești
20:30 EET (UTC+02)				Stadium: Ilie Oană; Referee: Radu Petrescu; Assistant referees: Vasile Marinescu, Valentin Avram; Fourth official: Marcel Bîrsan

25 October 2015 Round 15	Steaua București	1–1	Pandurii Târgu Jiu	Bucharest
20:00 EET (UTC+02)	Sulley 86'		Răduț 5'	Stadium: Arena Națională; Attendance: 3,000 (approximate); Referee: Alexandru Tudor; Assistant referees: Radu Ghinguleac, Ovidiu Artene; Fourth official: Horia Mladinovici

1 November 2015 Round 16	CFR Cluj	2–0	Steaua București	Cluj-Napoca
20:30 EET (UTC+02)	Bruno 32'; Păun 80'			Stadium: Dr. Constantin Rădulescu; Attendance: 7,000 (approximate); Referee: George Găman; Assistant referees: Aurel Oniță, Bogdan Gheorghe; Fourth official: Iulian Călin

8 November 2015 Round 17	Steaua București	5–3	Botoșani	Cluj-Napoca
20:30 EET (UTC+02)	Breeveld 2'; Stanciu 29', 72'; Tadé 30'; Râpă 68'		Roman 26'; Martinus 28'; Gonzalo Cabrera 55'	Stadium: Dr. Constantin Rădulescu; Attendance: 2,500 (approximate); Referee: Cătălin Popa; Assistant referees: Marius Marchidanu, Vlad Bârleanu; Fourth official: Iulian Călin

22 November 2015 Round 18	Dinamo București	3–1	Steaua București	Bucharest
20:30 EET (UTC+02)	Varela 55' (o.g.); Antun Palić 67'; Gnohéré 84'		Stanciu 90+2'	Stadium: Dinamo; Attendance: 10,448; Referee: Cristian Balaj; Assistant referees: Octavian Șovre, Vasile Marinescu; Fourth official: Dragoș Istrate

29 November 2015 Round 19	Steaua București	0–1	Astra Giurgiu	Pitești
20:30 EET (UTC+02)			Găman 90+5'	Stadium: Nicolae Dobrin; Attendance: 10,500 (approximate); Referee: Radu Petrescu; Assistant referees: Ovidiu Artene, Sebastian Gheorghe; Fourth official: Adrian Illyeș

2 December 2015 Round 20	Târgu Mureș	1–1	Steaua București	Cluj-Napoca
20:30 EET (UTC+02)	Costa 48'		Filip 41'	Stadium: Cluj Arena; Attendance: 2,000 (approximate); Referee: Ovidiu Hațegan; Assistant referees: Aurel Oniță, Alexandru Cerei; Fourth official: Alin Roșu

6 December 2015 Round 21	Steaua București	2–0	Universitatea Craiova	Pitești
20:30 EET (UTC+02)	Papp 81'; Tadé 83'			Stadium: Nicolae Dobrin; Attendance: 10,000 (approximate); Referee: Marius Avram; Assistant referees: Mircea Orbuleț, Vladimir Urzică; Fourth official: Marcel Bîrsan

14 December 2015 Round 22	Viitorul	0–1	Steaua București	Ovidiu
20:30 EET (UTC+02)			Hamroun 3'	Stadium: Viitorul; Attendance: 3,000 (approximate); Referee: Alexandru Tudor; Assistant referees: Vasile Marinescu, Valentin Avram; Fourth official: Horia Mladinovici

21 December 2015 Round 23	Steaua București	3–1	Poli Timișoara	Pitești
20:30 EET (UTC+02)	Bocșan 33' (o.g.); Stanciu 48'; Hamroun 80'		Popescu 82'	Stadium: Nicolae Dobrin; Attendance: 5,720; Referee: Adrian Cojocaru; Assistant referees: Andrei Constantinescu, Vlad Bârleanu; Fourth official: Cătălin Popa

15 February 2016 Round 24	Concordia Chiajna	0–2	Steaua București	Chiajna
20:30 EET (UTC+02)			Varela 6'; Hamroun 30'	Stadium: Concordia; Attendance: 4,000 (approximate); Referee: Adrian Comănescu; Assistant referees: Bucsi Imre-László, Florin Păunescu; Fourth official: Cătălin Buşi

22 February 2016 Round 25	Voluntari	3–1	Steaua București	Bucharest
20:30 EET (UTC+02)	Achim 37'; Koné 89', 90+4'		Popa 49'	Stadium: Dinamo; Attendance: 5,219; Referee: Cătălin Popa; Assistant referees: George Neacșu, Stelian Slabu; Fourth official: Iulian Călin

27 February 2016 Round 26	Steaua București	1–1	CSMS Iași	Pitești
20:30 EET (UTC+02)	Stanciu 46'		Golubović 25'	Stadium: Nicolae Dobrin; Attendance: 4,892; Referee: Cristian Balaj; Assistant referees: Alexandru Cerei, Ciprian Florin Danşa; Fourth official: George Rădulescu

==== Championship round ====
Overall								Home						Away					
Pld	W	D	L	GF	GA	GD	Pts	W	D	L	GF	GA	GD	W	D	L	GF	GA	GD
10	6	3	1	18	8	+10	21	3	2	0	9	3	+6	3	1	1	9	5	+4

Source: FCSB

===== Table =====
Pos	Team	Pld	W	D	L	GF	GA	GD	Pts	Qualification
1	Astra Giurgiu (C)	10	7	1	2	20	9	+11	48	Qualification for the Champions League third qualifying round
2	Steaua București	10	6	3	1	18	8	+10	43	Qualification for the Champions League third qualifying round
3	Pandurii Târgu Jiu	10	3	6	1	12	7	+5	39	Qualification for the Europa League third qualifying round
4	Dinamo București (Note: Dinamo București failed to obtain a UEFA licence after filing for insolvency in 2014.)	10	2	6	2	12	15	−3	36	
5	Viitorul Constanța	10	1	3	6	14	21	−7	29	Qualification for the Europa League third qualifying round
6	Târgu Mureș (Note: On 31 March 2016, the Adjudicatory Chamber of the UEFA Club Financial Control Body (CFCB) announced that Târgu Mureș will be excluded from participating in the next UEFA club competition for which they would otherwise qualify in the next three seasons (i.e. the 2016/17, 2017/18 and 2018/19 seasons).)	10	0	3	7	8	24	−16	22	

Source: Soccerway
Rules for classification: 1) Points.
(C) Champions

===== Position by round =====
Round	1	2	3	4	5	6	7	8	9	10
Ground	A	HR	A	A	H	H	A	W	H	A
Result	D	W	W	W	W	D	L	W	D	W
Position	4	3	2	2	2	2	2	2	2	2

Source: Matches
A = Away; H = Home; W = Win; D = Draw; L = Loss

===== Results =====
6 March 2016 Round 1	Dinamo București	1–1	Steaua București	Bucharest
20:30 EET (UTC+02)	Bicfalvi 81'		Hamroun 10'	Stadium: Dinamo; Attendance: 10,288; Referee: Ovidiu Hațegan; Assistant referees: Octavian Șovre, Sebastian Gheorghe; Fourth official: Mircea Mihail Grigoriu; Goal-line assistants: Dragoș Istrate, Horațiu Mircea Feșnic

13 March 2016 Round 2	Steaua București	2–0	Astra Giurgiu	Pitești
20:30 EET (UTC+02)	Momčilović 12'; Stanciu 59'			Stadium: Nicolae Dobrin; Attendance: 8,250; Referee: Alexandru Tudor; Assistant referees: Aurel Onița, Mircea Orbuleț; Fourth official: Daniel Mitruți; Goal-line assistants: Andrei Florin Chivulete, Iulian Călin

19 March 2016 Round 3	Viitorul	1–3	Steaua București	Ovidiu
20:30 EET (UTC+02)	Tănase 73'		Hamroun 35'; Popa 39'; Stanciu 59'	Stadium: Viitorul; Attendance: 4,000; Referee: Marcel Bîrsan; Assistant referees: Ovidiu Artene, Marius Nicoară; Fourth official: Bogdan Velicu; Goal-line assistants: Lucian Rusandu, Cătălin Popa

30 March 2016 Round 4	Pandurii Târgu Jiu	0–1	Steaua București	Drobeta-Turnu Severin
21:00 EET (UTC+02)			Stanciu 89'	Stadium: Municipal; Attendance: 8,000; Referee: Marius Avram; Assistant referees: Miklós Nagy, Alexandru Cerei; Fourth official: Bogdan Gheorghe; Goal-line assistants: Adrian Comănescu, Dragoș Istrate

3 April 2016 Round 5	Steaua București	2–1	Târgu Mureș	Bucharest
20:30 EET (UTC+02)	Popa 40'; González 84' (o.g.)		Brandán 62'	Stadium: Arena Națională; Attendance: 13,475; Referee: Ovidiu Hațegan; Assistant referees: Octavian Șovre, Sebastian Gheorghe; Fourth official: Iulian Radu; Goal-line assistants: Marian Balaci, Horațiu Feșnic

10 April 2016 Round 6	Steaua București	1–1	Dinamo București	Bucharest
20:30 EET (UTC+02)	Filip 16' (o.g.)		Gnohéré 48'	Stadium: Arena Națională; Attendance: 48,613; Referee: Alexandru Tudor; Assistant referees: Radu Ghinguleac, Ovidiu Artene; Fourth official: Sebastian Stoianov; Goal-line assistants: Marcel Bîrsan, Cătălin Popa

16 April 2016 Round 7	Astra Giurgiu	2–0	Steaua București	Giurgiu
20:30 EET (UTC+02)	Găman 45'; Alibec 77'			Stadium: Marin Anastasovici; Attendance: 4,500; Referee: Cristian Balaj; Assistant referees: Aurel Oniță, Alexandru Cerei; Fourth official: Daniel Mitruți; Goal-line assistants: Iulian Călin, Marian Balaci

23 April 2016 Round 8	Steaua București	3–0	Viitorul	Bucharest
20:30 EET (UTC+02)	Varela 2'; Chipciu 28'; Tadé 67'			Stadium: Arena Națională; Attendance: 3,420; Referee: Cătălin Popa; Assistant referees: Vladimir Urzică, Daniel Mitruți; Fourth official: Marian Barbu

1 May 2016 Round 9	Steaua București	1–1	Pandurii Târgu Jiu	Bucharest
20:30 EET (UTC+02)	Enache 66'		Hora 60'	Stadium: Arena Națională; Attendance: 4,000; Referee: Radu Petrescu; Assistant referees: Sebastian Gheorghe, Alexandru Cerei; Fourth official: Florin Păunescu; Goal-line assistants: Adrian Cojocaru, Horațiu Feșnic

10 May 2016 Round 10	Târgu Mureș	1–4	Steaua București	Târgu Mureș
21:00 EET (UTC+02)	Gorobsov 90'		Bawab 17'; Chipciu 49'; Popadiuc 51'; Onțel 67'	Stadium: Trans-Sil; Referee: Iulian Călin; Assistant referees: Ovidiu Artene, Vladimir Urzică; Fourth official: Dragoș Istrate

=== Cupa României ===
==== Results ====
24 September 2015 Round of 32	Universitatea Cluj	0–1	Steaua București	Cluj-Napoca
20:30 EET (UTC+02)			Tahar 81'	Stadium: Cluj Arena; Attendance: 10,000 (approximate); Referee: Denis Haidiner; Assistant referees: Tunyogi Ferencz, Florin Badea; Fourth official: Nicolae Botaș

29 October 2015 Round of 16	Baia Mare	1–1 (a.e.t.) (1–4 p)	Steaua București	Baia Mare
20:30 EET (UTC+02)	Păcurar 11'		Tade 27' (pen.)	Stadium: Viorel Mateianu; Attendance: 14,000; Referee: Florin Marcu
	Penalties
	Vasile (penalty missed); Deac (penalty scored); Străuţ (penalty missed)		Tade (penalty scored); Chipciu (penalty scored); Varela (penalty scored); Carp (penalty scored)

17 December 2015 Quarter-finals	Viitorul	0–1	Steaua București	Ovidiu
20:30 EET (UTC+02)			Stanciu 48'	Stadium: Viitorul; Referee: Radu Petrescu; Assistant referees: Ovidiu Artene, Ciprian Danșa; Fourth official: Ionuț Coza

3 March 2016 Semi-finals	Dinamo București	0–0	Steaua București	Bucharest
20:30 EET (UTC+02)				Stadium: Dinamo; Referee: Radu Petrescu; Assistant referees: Ovidiu Artene, Radu Ghinguleac; Fourth official: Aurel Onița; Goal-line assistants: Adrian Cojocaru, Iulian Călin

20 April 2016 Semi-finals	Steaua București	2–2 (2–2 agg.)	Dinamo București	Bucharest
21:30 EET (UTC+02)	Enache 17'; Chipciu 52'		Ekeng 51'; Puljić 48'	Stadium: Arena Națională; Referee: Cristian Balaj; Assistant referees: Vasile Marinescu, Ovidiu Artene; Fourth official: Dragoș Iliescu; Goal-line assistants: Radu Petrescu, Adrian Cojocaru

=== Cupa Ligii ===
==== Results ====
15 October 2015 Quarter-finals	Steaua București	1–0	Poli Timișoara	Bucharest
21:00 EET (UTC+02)	Chipciu 32'			Stadium: Arena Națională; Referee: Andrei Chivulete; Assistant referees: Marius Nicoară, Daniel Mitruți; Fourth official: George Rădulescu

9 March 2016 Semi-finals	Steaua București	1–0	Astra Giurgiu	Pitești
21:00 EET (UTC+02)	Tadé 63'			Stadium: Stadionul Nicolae Dobrin; Referee: Marius Avram; Assistant referees: Vasile Marinescu, Vladimir Urzică

13 April 2016 Semi-finals	Astra Giurgiu	0–2 (0–3 agg.)	Steaua București	Giurgiu
17:30 EET (UTC+02)		Report	Bawab 4', 51'	Stadium: Marin Anastasovici; Referee: Ovidiu Hațegan; Assistant referees: Octavian Șovre, Sebastian Gheorghe

17 July 2016 Final	Steaua București	2–1 (a.e.t.)	Concordia Chiajna	Bucharest
20:00 EET (UTC+02)	Momčilović 61'; Hamroun 111' (pen.)	Report	Pena 88'	Stadium: Arena Națională; Referee: Marius Avram; Assistant referees: Radu Ghinguleac, Mircea Orbuleț; Goal-line assistants: Adrian Cojocaru

=== UEFA Champions League ===
==== Qualifying rounds ====
===== Second qualifying round =====
14 July 2015 First leg	Trenčín (Slovakia)	0–2	(Romania) Steaua București	Žilina, Slovakia
21:30 EET (UTC+02)		Report	Stanciu 63'; Hamroun 70'	Stadium: pod Dubňom; Referee: Alejandro Hernández (Spain); Assistant referees: Teodoro Sobrino, César García Fernández; Fourth official: Ignacio Iglesias Villanueva

22 July 2015 Second leg	Steaua București (Romania)	2–3 (4–3 agg.)	(Slovakia) Trenčín	Bucharest, Romania
21:30 EET (UTC+02)	Muniru 57'; Tadé 60' (pen.)		Wesley 13', 84'; Bero 21'	Stadium: Arena Națională; Attendance: 0 (close doors); Referee: Paweł Raczkowski (Poland); Assistant referees: Michal Obukowicz, Paweł Sokolnicki; Fourth official: Tomasz Musiał

===== Third qualifying round =====
29 July 2015 First leg	Steaua București (Romania)	1–1	(Serbia) Partizan	Bucharest, Romania
21:30 EET (UTC+02)	Varela 81'		Vulićević 62'	Stadium: Arena Națională; Attendance: 0 (close doors); Referee: Kevin Blom (Netherlands); Assistant referees: Bas van Dongen, Patrick Langkamp; Fourth official: Danny Makkelie

5 August 2015 Second leg	Partizan (Serbia)	4–2 (5–3 agg.)	(Romania) Steaua București	Belgrade, Serbia
21:45 EET (UTC+02)	Babović 8'; Jevtović 60'; Živković 70'; Trujić 90+1'		Muniru 11'; Hamroun 33'	Stadium: Partizan; Referee: István Vad (Hungary); Assistant referees: Peter Berettyán, László Viszokai; Fourth official: Sandor Szabo

=== UEFA Europa League ===
==== Qualifying round ====
===== Play-off round =====
20 August 2015 First leg	Steaua București (Romania)	0–3	(Norway) Rosenborg	Bucharest, Romania
21:00 EET (UTC+02)			Mikkelsen 61'; Helland 67'; Jensen 90+3'	Stadium: Arena Națională; Referee: Luca Banti (Italy); Assistant referees: Alessandro Costanzo, Alfonso Marazzo; Fourth official: Daniele Doveri

27 August 2015 Second leg	Rosenborg (Norway)	0–1 (3–1 agg.)	(Romania) Steaua București	Trondheim, Norway
21:00 EET (UTC+02)			Popa 54'	Stadium: Lerkendal; Referee: Bobby Madden (Scotland); Assistant referees: Graham Chambers, Douglas Ross; Fourth official: John Beaton

=== Non competitive matches ===
Date	Team	Results			Steaua scorers
Date	Team	Home	Away	Neutral	Steaua scorers
19 June 2015	(Romania) Zărnești			8–0	Iancu 20', 24', Popa 31', Chipciu 46', 79', Țucudean 72', Grădinaru 84', Tănase 87'
24 June 2015	Austria Klagenfurt			4–5	Țucudean 47', 62', Tudorie 80', Râpă 83'
26 June 2015	(Poland) Legia Warsaw			1–1	Neagu 70'
30 June 2015	(Russia) Rubin Kazan			2–1	Tudorie 62', Iancu 79'
3 July 2015	(Azerbaijan) Qarabağ			3–2	Iancu 2', Tudorie 57', Mihalcea 90'
5 September 2015	(United Arab Emirates) Al-Ittihad Kalba			1–0	Tadé 50'
17 September 2015	(Romania) Tunari			4–0	Chipciu 10', 30', Tahar 24', Onțel 87'
10 October 2015	(Romania) Viitorul Constanța			0–1	
17 November 2015	(Romania) Pitești			1–0	Stanciu 36'
19 January 2016	(Switzerland) Young Boys			2–2	Hamroun 15', 65'
26 January 2016	(Hungary) Újpest			2–0	Stanciu 32', Popa 85'
29 January 2016	(Austria) Sturm Graz			1–0	Marica 61'
31 January 2016	(Bulgaria) Ludogorets Razgrad			0–3	
4 February 2016	(Sweden) Djurgården			2–2	Varela 4', Hamroun 21'
6 February 2016	(Slovakia) Trenčín			0–1	

== See also ==
- 2015 Supercupa României
- 2015–16 Cupa României
- 2015–16 Cupa Ligii
- 2015–16 Liga I
- 2015–16 UEFA Champions League
