= George Țucudean =

Romanian footballer (born 1991)

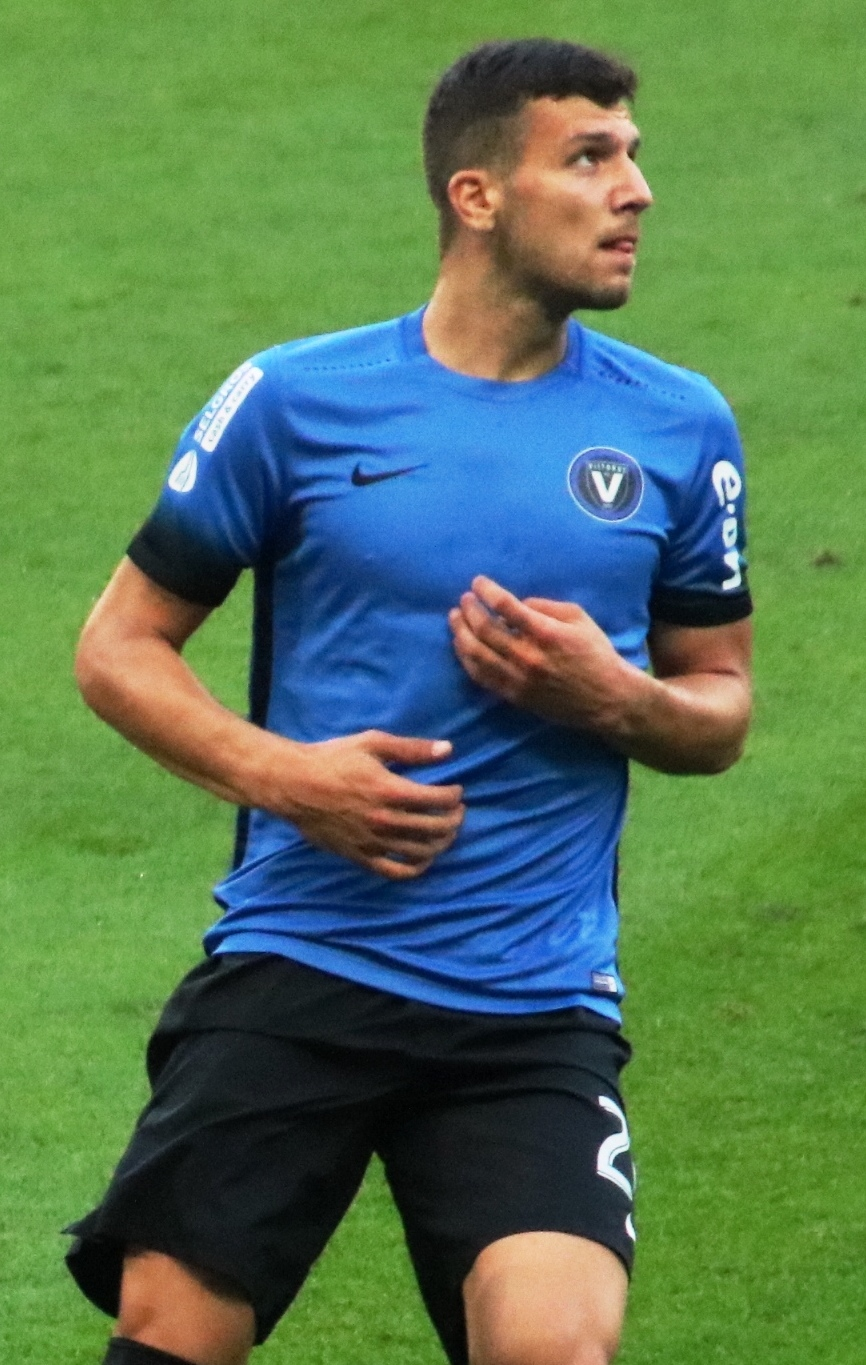
- Țucudean playing for Viitorul Constanța in 2017

Personal information
- Full name: Marius George Țucudean
- Date of birth: 30 April 1991 (age 35)
- Place of birth: Arad, Romania
- Height: 1.86 m (6 ft 1 in)
- Position: Forward

Youth career
- 2005–2008: Atletico Arad

Senior career*
| Years | Team | Apps | (Gls) |
| 2008–2010 | UTA Arad | 41 | (12) |
| 2010–2013 | Dinamo București | 52 | (10) |
| 2010 | → UTA Arad (loan) | 12 | (9) |
| 2013–2014 | Standard Liège | 3 | (0) |
| 2013–2014 | → Dinamo București (loan) | 22 | (7) |
| 2014–2016 | Charlton Athletic | 20 | (2) |
| 2015 | → Steaua București (loan) | 17 | (3) |
| 2016 | → ASA Târgu Mureș (loan) | 9 | (2) |
| 2016–2017 | Pandurii Târgu Jiu | 15 | (5) |
| 2017–2018 | Viitorul Constanța | 26 | (15) |
| 2018–2020 | CFR Cluj | 47 | (23) |
| Total | | 264 | (88) |

International career
| 2007–2008 | Romania U17 | 3 | (0) |
| 2009–2010 | Romania U19 | 5 | (1) |
| 2011–2012 | Romania U21 | 5 | (2) |
| 2017–2019 | Romania | 10 | (3) |
- * Club domestic league appearances and goals

Marius George Țucudean (Romanian pronunciation: [ˈmari.us ˈdʒe̯ordʒe tsukuˈde̯an]; born 30 April 1991) is a Romanian former professional footballer who played as a forward.

He made his senior debut with UTA Arad in 2008, and throughout his career represented among others Dinamo București, Steaua București, Viitorul Constanța and CFR Cluj, winning a combined ten domestic trophies. Țucudean also had two unsuccessful spells abroad, with Standard Liège and Charlton Athletic respectively. With CFR Cluj, he was the top scorer of the Romanian first division in the 2017–18 and 2018–19 seasons, and was named the Romanian Footballer of the Year for 2018 by the Gazeta Sporturilor newspaper.

Țucudean made his first appearance for the Romania national team in November 2017, and scored his first goal for the country the following year in a 2–1 victory over Israel.

== Club career ==
=== UTA Arad ===
Țucudean started his career playing for hometown club UTA Arad. He stayed with UTA for two years before joining Liga I team Dinamo București.

=== Dinamo București ===
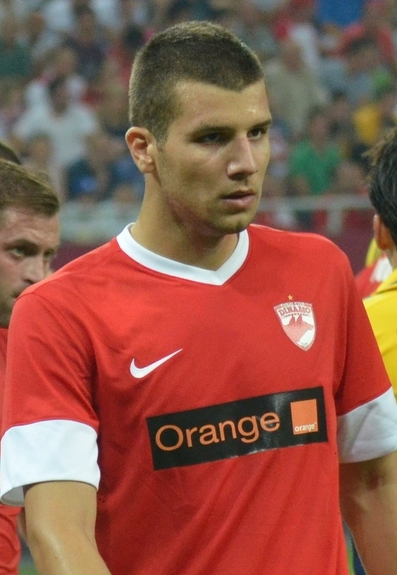
Țucudean with Dinamo București in 2012

He made his debut for Dinamo București on 1 April 2011 in a game against Universitatea Cluj. Țucudean made an immediate impact at the capital-based club, scoring four goals from 13 appearances in the second half of the 2010–11 season. In the following campaign he made 30 appearances and scored four goals, also recording his UEFA Europa League debut.

On 14 July 2012, Țucudean netted twice against CFR Cluj in the Supercupa României, with Dinamo eventually winning the trophy at the penalty shoot-out. He was named man of the match for his performance. Fifteen days later, Țucudean scored four goals and offered an assist in the opener of the 2012–13 Liga I against CSMS Iași.

=== Standard Liège ===
On 31 January 2013, Țucudean agreed to a four-and-a-half-year contract with Belgian side Standard Liège, where he was wanted by coach Mircea Rednic and was teammate with fellow Romanian Adrian Cristea. After failing to score a goal in eleven league games, in the summer of the same year he rejoined Dinamo București on a season-long loan.

=== Charlton Athletic ===
Țucudean signed a three-year deal with English club Charlton Athletic in July 2014. On 19 August, he scored his first goal in a 3–2 win over Derby County. His second goal came in a 2–1 victory against Bolton Wanderers on 21 October, a game in which he also assisted Johnnie Jackson's winner.

On 28 January 2015, he was loaned out with an option to buy to Steaua București, the cross-town rival of his former team Dinamo. During his spell with the Roș-albaștrii, he won the Liga I, the Cupa României and the newly formed Cupa Ligii. He returned to Charlton in September, but in January the following year Țucudean again left on loan to join ASA Târgu Mureș. His contract with Charlton was terminated on 1 July 2016.

=== Viitorul Constanța ===
On 22 March 2017, Țucudean signed with Viitorul Constanța.

=== CFR Cluj ===
Țucudean was transferred to CFR Cluj for an undisclosed fee on 8 January 2018. He ended the 2017–18 season as the top scorer of the league championship, a position he shared with Steaua București striker Harlem Gnohéré.

Following his good display throughout the year, in late November Țucudean was nominated for Gazeta Sporturilor's 2018 Romanian Footballer of the Year award. On 21 December, he was announced as the winner of the trophy. Shortly after the start of the 2019–20 season, Țucudean temporarily retired from football in order to fully recover after undergoing two heart surgeries earlier in the year.

== International career ==
Țucudean is a former Romania under-17 and under-19 international, having played 3 and 5 games respectively. He scored three goals for the under-21 side as well.

He scored his first goal for the senior team in a 2–1 victory over Israel, on 24 March 2018.

== Personal life ==
Țucudean is part of a wealthy family, their fortune being estimated by Romanian press at figures between €80 million and €100 million. His father Marius was also a footballer who played as a striker for UTA Arad, but retired at age 27 after being diagnosed with a heart disorder.

== Career statistics ==
=== Club ===
Appearances and goals by club, season and competition
| Club | Season | League | | | National cup (Note: Includes Cupa României, FA Cup) | | Continental | | Other | | Total | |
| Club | Season | Division | Apps | Goals | Apps | Goals | Apps | Goals | Apps | Goals | Apps | Goals |
|---|---|---|---|---|---|---|---|---|---|---|---|---|
| UTA Arad | 2008–09 | Liga II | 14 | 6 | 0 | 0 | — | | — | | 14 | 6 |
| UTA Arad | 2009–10 | Liga II | 27 | 6 | 0 | 0 | — | | — | | 27 | 6 |
| UTA Arad | Total | | 41 | 12 | 0 | 0 | 0 | 0 | 0 | 0 | 41 | 12 |
| UTA Arad (loan) | 2010–11 | Liga II | 12 | 9 | 0 | 0 | — | | — | | 12 | 9 |
| Dinamo București | 2010–11 | Liga I | 10 | 2 | 3 | 2 | — | | — | | 13 | 4 |
| Dinamo București | 2011–12 | Liga I | 24 | 2 | 4 | 1 | 3 (Note: Appearances in UEFA Europa League) | 1 | – | | 31 | 4 |
| Dinamo București | 2012–13 | Liga I | 18 | 6 | 3 | 0 | 2 | 0 | 1 (Note: Appearance in Supercupa României) | 2 | 24 | 8 |
| Dinamo București | Total | | 52 | 10 | 10 | 3 | 5 | 1 | 1 | 2 | 68 | 16 |
| Standard Liège | 2012–13 | Belgian Pro League | 3 | 0 | — | | — | | 8 (Note: Seven appearances in Belgian Pro League Championship play-offs, one appearance in Testmatches Europa League) | 0 | 11 | 0 |
| Dinamo București (loan) | 2013–14 | Liga I | 22 | 7 | 4 | 0 | — | | — | | 26 | 7 |
| Charlton Athletic | 2014–15 | Championship | 20 | 2 | 1 | 0 | — | | 2 (Note: Appearances in League Cup) | 0 | 23 | 2 |
| Charlton Athletic | 2015–16 | Championship | 0 | 0 | 0 | 0 | — | | 0 | 0 | 0 | 0 |
| Charlton Athletic | Total | | 20 | 2 | 1 | 0 | 0 | 0 | 2 | 0 | 23 | 2 |
| Steaua București (loan) | 2014–15 | Liga I | 17 | 3 | 2 | 0 | — | | 2 (Note: Appearances in Cupa Ligii) | 2 | 21 | 5 |
| Steaua București (loan) | 2015–16 | Liga I | 0 | 0 | 0 | 0 | 0 | 0 | 0 | 0 | 0 | 0 |
| Steaua București (loan) | Total | | 17 | 3 | 2 | 0 | 0 | 0 | 2 | 2 | 21 | 5 |
| ASA Târgu Mureș (loan) | 2015–16 | Liga I | 9 | 2 | 2 | 0 | — | | — | | 21 | 5 |
| Pandurii Târgu Jiu | 2016–17 | Liga I | 15 | 5 | 0 | 0 | — | | 1 | 0 | 16 | 5 |
| Viitorul Constanța | 2016–17 | Liga I | 6 | 4 | 0 | 0 | — | | – | | 6 | 4 |
| Viitorul Constanța | 2017–18 | Liga I | 20 | 11 | 0 | 0 | 3 (Note: One appearance in UEFA Champions League, two appearances and one goal in UEFA Europa League) | 1 | 0 | 0 | 23 | 12 |
| Viitorul Constanța | Total | | 26 | 15 | 0 | 0 | 3 | 1 | 0 | 0 | 29 | 16 |
| CFR Cluj | 2017–18 | Liga I | 14 | 4 | — | | — | | — | | 14 | 4 |
| CFR Cluj | 2018–19 | Liga I | 27 | 18 | 2 | 1 | 6 (Note: Two appearances in UEFA Champions League, four appearances and two goals in UEFA Europa League) | 2 | 1 | 0 | 36 | 21 |
| CFR Cluj | 2019–20 | Liga I | 6 | 1 | 0 | 0 | 5 (Note: Appearances in UEFA Champions League) | 1 | 1 | 0 | 12 | 2 |
| CFR Cluj | Total | | 47 | 23 | 2 | 1 | 11 | 3 | 2 | 0 | 62 | 27 |
| Career total | | | 264 | 88 | 21 | 4 | 19 | 5 | 16 | 4 | 320 | 101 |

=== International ===
Appearances and goals by national team and year
| National team | Year | Apps | Goals |
|---|---|---|---|
Romania
| Romania | 2017 | 2 | 0 |
| Romania | 2018 | 7 | 3 |
| Romania | 2019 | 1 | 0 |
| Total | | 10 | 3 |

Scores and results list Romania's goal tally first, score column indicates score after each Țucudean goal.

List of international goals scored by George Țucudean
| No. | Date | Venue | Opponent | Score | Result | Competition |
|---|---|---|---|---|---|---|
| 1 | 24 March 2018 | Netanya Stadium, Netanya, Israel | Israel | 2–1 | 2–1 | Friendly |
| 2 | 10 September 2018 | Partizan Stadium, Belgrade, Serbia | Serbia | 2–2 | 2–2 | 2018–19 UEFA Nations League C |
| 3 | 20 November 2018 | Podgorica City Stadium, Podgorica, Montenegro | Montenegro | 1–0 | 1–0 | 2018–19 UEFA Nations League C |

== Honours ==
Dinamo București

- Cupa României: 2011–12
- Supercupa României: 2012

Steaua București

- Liga I: 2014–15
- Cupa României: 2014–15
- Supercupa României runner-up: 2015
- Cupa Ligii: 2014–15

Viitorul Constanța

- Liga I: 2016–17
- Supercupa României runner-up: 2017

CFR Cluj

- Liga I: 2017–18, 2018–19, 2019–20
- Supercupa României: 2018

Individual

- Liga I Team of the Championship play-offs: 2017–18,
- Gazeta Sporturilor Romanian Footballer of the Year: 2018
- Liga I Team of the Regular Season: 2018–19,
- Liga I Team of the Season: 2018–19,
- Liga I top scorer: 2017–18 (shared Harlem Gnohéré), 2018–19
