= Cătălin Carp =

Moldovan footballer

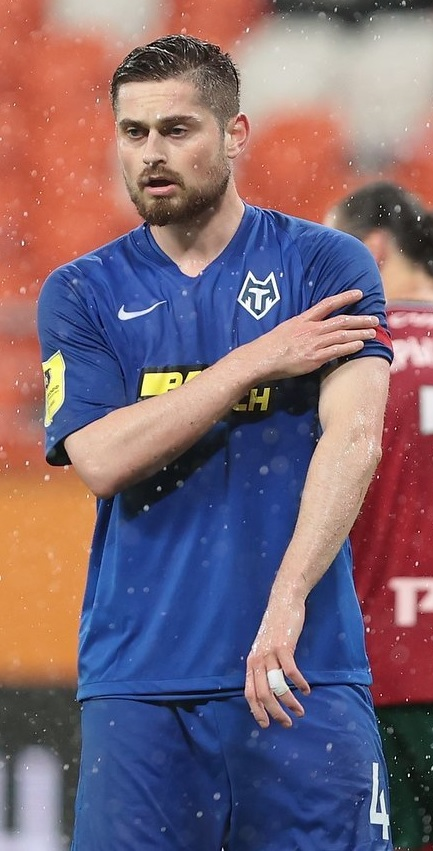
- Carp with Tambov in 2021

Personal information
- Date of birth: 20 October 1993 (age 33)
- Place of birth: Chișinău, Moldova
- Height: 1.87 m (6 ft 2 in)
- Positions: Defensive midfielder; centre back

Team information
- Current team: Ayia Napa
- Number: 17

Youth career
- –2009: Zimbru Chișinău
- 2009–2011: CSCA Buiucani
- 2011: Shakhtar Donetsk
- 2011–2013: Dynamo Kyiv

Senior career*
Years	Team	Apps	(Gls)
2013–2014	Dynamo-2 Kyiv	23	(0)
2014–2015	CFR Cluj	17	(0)
2015–2016	Steaua București	9	(0)
2016–2017	Viitorul Constanța	14	(0)
2017–2021	Ufa	79	(3)
2021	Tambov	9	(0)
2021–2022	Dinamo București	13	(2)
2022–2023	Ufa	23	(0)
2023	UTA Arad	15	(2)
2024	Neftchi Fergana	11	(1)
2024–2025	Omonia 29M	15	(0)
2025	Petrocub Hîncești	4	(0)
2025–2026	Concordia Chiajna	12	(1)
2026–	Ayia Napa	3	(1)

International career
2009	Moldova U17	2	(0)
2010	Moldova U19	2	(0)
2013–2014	Moldova U21	22	(4)
2013–2021	Moldova	36	(2)
- * Club domestic league appearances and goals as of 10 October 2026

Cătălin Carp (born 20 October 1993) is a Moldovan professional footballer who plays as a defensive midfielder or a centre back for Cypriot Second Division club Ayia Napa.

== Club career ==
Carp made his way through the youth system of the Ukrainian football club FC Shakhtar Donetsk.

In January 2012 Carp signed a three-year deal with Ukrainian Premier League side FC Dynamo Kyiv.

On 27 January 2017, he joined a Russian Premier League club FC Ufa on a 3.5-year contract. On 18 January 2021, he exercised the option to terminate his contract early.

On 28 October 2021, he signed a one-year contract with Romanian club Dinamo București.

On 13 July 2022, Carp returned to Ufa. Carp left Ufa following their relegation to the third-tier Russian Second League in June 2023.

In June 2023, Carp returned to Romania when he joined UTA Arad on a one-year contract with the option for a further year.

== International career ==
On 14 August 2013, Carp made his debut for the Moldova national football team in a friendly match against Andorra.

== Personal life ==
His father, Ilie Carp, was a football scout and coach, who previously managed in Moldova, Belarus, Kazakhstan and Azerbaijan.

== Career statistics ==
=== Club ===
As of match played 10 October 2026

Appearances and goals by club, season and competition
Club	Season	League			National cup (Note: Includes Cupa României, Russian Cup, Uzbekistan Cup, Cypriot Cup)		Continental		Other		Total	
Club	Season	Division	Apps	Goals	Apps	Goals	Apps	Goals	Apps	Goals	Apps	Goals
Dynamo-2 Kyiv	2013–14	Ukrainian First League	23	0	—		—		—		23	0
CFR Cluj	2014–15	Liga I	17	0	3	0	—		—		20	0
Steaua București	2015–16	Liga I	9	0	2	0	0	0	2 (Note: Appearances in Cupa Ligii)	0	13	0
Viitorul Constanța	2016–17	Liga I	14	0	2	0	2 (Note: Appearances in UEFA Europa League)	0	0	0	18	0
Ufa	2016–17	Russian Premier League	9	0	2	0	—		—		11	0
Ufa	2017–18	Russian Premier League	10	0	1	0	—		—		11	0
Ufa	2018–19	Russian Premier League	24	2	0	0	5	0	2 (Note: Appearances in Russian Premier League promotion/relegation play-offs)	0	31	2
Ufa	2019–20	Russian Premier League	24	1	1	0	—		—		25	1
Ufa	2020–21	Russian Premier League	12	0	0	0	—		—		12	0
Ufa	Total		79	3	4	0	5	0	2	0	90	3
Tambov	2020–21	Russian Premier League	9	0	—		—		—		9	0
Dinamo București	2021–22	Liga I	13	2	—		—		2 (Note: Appearances in Liga I promotion/relegation play-offs)	0	15	2
Ufa	2022–23	Russian First League	23	0	2	0	—		—		25	0
UTA Arad	2023–24	Liga I	15	2	3	0	—		—		18	2
Neftchi Fergana	2024	Uzbekistan Super League	11	1	4	0	—		—		15	1
Omonia 29M	2024–25	Cypriot First Division	15	0	1	0	—		—		16	0
Petrocub Hîncești	2024–25	Moldovan Super Liga	4	0	1	0	—		—		5	0
Concordia Chiajna	2025–26	Liga II	12	1	5	0	—		—		17	1
Ayia Napa	2026–27	Cypriot Second Division	3	1	0	0	—		—		3	1
Career total			247	10	27	0	7	0	6	0	287	10

=== International ===
As of match played 31 March 2021

Appearances and goals by national team and year
National team	Year	Apps	Goals
Moldova	2013	1	0
Moldova	2014	0	0
Moldova	2015	6	1
Moldova	2016	4	0
Moldova	2017	3	0
Moldova	2018	8	0
Moldova	2019	7	0
Moldova	2020	4	0
Moldova	2021	3	1
Total		36	2

As of 31 March 2021.
Scores and results list Moldova's goal tally first, score column indicates score after each Carp goal.

List of international goals scored by Cătălin Carp
No.	Date	Venue	Opponent	Score	Result	Competition
1	14 February 2015	Mardan Sports Complex, Antalya, Turkey	Romania	1–0	1–2	Friendly
2	31 March 2021	Zimbru Stadium, Chișinău, Moldova	Israel	1–0	1–4	2022 FIFA World Cup qualification

== Honours ==
Steaua București

- Cupa Ligii: 2015–16

Viitorul Constanța

- Liga I: 2016–17
