= Aymen Tahar =

Algerian footballer (born 1989)

Personal information
- Date of birth: 2 October 1989 (age 37)
- Place of birth: Algiers, Algeria
- Height: 1.76 m (5 ft 9 in)
- Position: Midfielder

Youth career
- 2006–2008: Sheffield United

Senior career*
Years	Team	Apps	(Gls)
2008–2010	Sheffield United	0	(0)
2010–2012	Staveley Miners Welfare		
2012–2015	Gaz Metan Mediaș	92	(5)
2015–2016	Steaua București	15	(1)
2016	→ Boavista (loan)	11	(0)
2016	Sagan Tosu	1	(0)
2017	Gaz Metan Mediaș	12	(0)
2017–2019	Boavista	27	(0)
2019–2021	Panetolikos	53	(2)
2021	AEL	4	(0)
Total		215	(8)

International career^{‡}
2008	Algeria U20	4	(2)
- * Club domestic league appearances and goals as of 17:00, 27 December 2021 (UTC) ‡ National team caps and goals as of 11 July 2011

Aymen Tahar (Arabic: أيمن طاهر; born 2 October 1989) is an Algerian professional footballer who last played as a midfielder for Greek Super League 2 club AEL. At international level, he has represented the Algeria U20 national team.

== Club career ==
=== Playing in England ===
Aymen was born in Algiers, Algeria, and raised in Sheffield, England to an Algerian family. Though he grew up supporting Arsenal, Aymen played in Sunday League football and his performance caught the attention of Luis Silva, who had a role of helping him join the Sheffield United academy in 2005 where he progressed through the ranks and was a regular in the reserve side up to 2008–2009 season. He made his début at the end of February 2009, coming on as a late sub for Lee Hendrie against Hull City in the FA Cup 5th round. At the end of the season, Tahar was released by the club.

After leaving Sheffield United, he joined Staveley Miners Welfare and had a successful spell there, having become a key player for the club.

=== Playing in Romania ===
On 8 February 2012, Tahar joined Romanian club Gaz Metan Mediaș, signing a contract until 2015. Tahar later stated in an interview that he find it difficult to move away from England to Romania at first.

Tahar made his Gaz Metan Mediaș debut, where he came on as a substitute in the 66th minute, in a 2–0 win over Dinamo București on 3 March 2012. After struggling in the first team for the first two seasons at Gaz Metan Mediaș, Tahar began to established himself in the first team and then scored his first Gaz Metan Mediaș goal on 15 September 2013, in a 2–1 win over Brașov, with his second goal for the club later came on 26 October 2013, in a 3–1 win over Ceahlăul Piatra Neamț. Tahar later ended the 2013–14 season with 33 appearances and two goals. The 2014–15 season then saw Tahar regained his first team place and started the opening game of the season well when he scored his first goal of the season, in a 3–0 win over Botoșani Tahar then later added two more goals later in the season against Ceahlăul Piatra Neamț and Dinamo București. Tahar went on to finish the season with 30 appearances and three goals, but was unable to help the club survive relegation from Liga I.

On 30 June 2015, Tahar joined Romanian club Steaua București, signing a contract until 30 June 2019. Tahar revealed he nearly joined Slovak side Slovan Bratislava before moving to Steaua București. Tahar made his Steaua București debut, playing 14 minutes after coming on as a substitute, in a 0–0 draw against Petrolul Ploiești on 11 July 2015. After being left out of the squad in late-August, Tahar then regained his first team place and scored his first goal for the club in the Round of 32 of Cupa României, in a 1–0 win over Universitatea Cluj. Weeks later on 3 October 2015, Tahar scored his first league goal for the club, in a 2–1 win over Politehnica Iași. However, under the management of Laurențiu Reghecampf, Tahar soon fell out of favour after his form slumped and was told he can leave the club.

=== Boavista and Sagan Tosu ===
No longer wanted at Steaua București, Tahar joined Primeira Liga side Boavista on loan until the end of the season. Tahar then made his Boavista debut on 7 February 2016, where he played 4 minutes, in a 1–0 win over Paços de Ferreira. Then on 11 March 2016, Tahar provided an assist for Zé Manuel to help Boavista win 3–0 against Marítimo. Tahar went on to make eleven appearances for Boavista and returned to his parent club. Upon returning to Steaua București, Tahar was told by the club management that he was no longer in the first team.

On 4 August 2016, Tahar moved abroad to Asia, where he joined J1 League side Sagan Tosu.

=== Returning in Romania ===
On 30 January 2017, Tahar returned to Romanian first league team Gaz Metan Mediaș for which he played between 2012 and 2015.

== International career ==
In November 2008, Tahar was chosen for the elite training camp for the Algeria U20 team.

Tahar is also eligible to play for England, having been raised in England and receiving a British Citizenship.

== Career statistics ==
As of match played 10 May 2016

Appearances and goals by club, season and competition
Club	Season	League		National cup		League cup		Europe		Other		Total	
Club	Season	Apps	Goals	Apps	Goals	Apps	Goals	Apps	Goals	Apps	Goals	Apps	Goals
Sheffield United	2008–09	0	0	1	0	0	0	–		–		1	0
Sheffield United	2009–10	0	0	0	0	0	0	–		–		0	0
Sheffield United	Total	0	0	1	0	0	0	0	0	0	0	1	0
Ferencváros	2009–10	0	0	0	0	–		–		–		0	0
Staveley Miners Welfare	2010–11					–		–		–			
Staveley Miners Welfare	2011–12					–		–		–			
Staveley Miners Welfare	Total					0	0	0	0	0	0		
Gaz Metan Mediaș	2011–12	10	0	1	0	–		–		–		11	0
Gaz Metan Mediaș	2012–13	19	0	0	0	–		–		–		19	0
Gaz Metan Mediaș	2013–14	33	2	1	0	–		–		–		34	2
Gaz Metan Mediaș	2014–15	30	3	0	0	1	0	–		–		31	3
Gaz Metan Mediaș	Total	92	5	2	0	1	0	0	0	0	0	95	5
Steaua București	2015–16	15	1	3	1	1	0	4	0	1	0	24	2
Boavista (loan)	2015–16	11	0	–		–		–		–		11	0
Career total		117	6	6	1	2	0	4	0	1	0	130	7

== Honours ==
Steaua București

- League Cup: 2015–16
- Supercupa României runner-up: 2015
