= Cristian Onțel =

Romanian footballer

Personal information
- Full name: Cristian Iulian Onțel
- Date of birth: 5 April 1998 (age 28)
- Place of birth: Bucharest, Romania
- Height: 1.86 m (6 ft 1 in)
- Positions: Midfielder; forward

Team information
- Current team: ACS FC Dinamo
- Number: 7

Senior career*
Years	Team	Apps	(Gls)
2015–2017	Steaua București	5	(1)
2016	→ Steaua II București	11	(7)
2017	→ Academica Clinceni (loan)	11	(0)
2017	Voința Turnu Măgurele	8	(1)
2018	Național Sebiș	21	(9)
2019	Lugoj	12	(9)
2019	Popești-Leordeni	2	(0)
2020	Minaur Baia Mare	0	(0)
2020–2021	Popești-Leordeni	6	(9)
2021–2022	Afumați	24	(14)
2022–2023	Metalul Buzău	12	(7)
2023–2024	Dunărea Ciocănești	16	(11)
2024–2025	ACS FC Dinamo	12	(5)
Total		140	(74)
- * Club domestic league appearances and goals as of 16:24, 10 July 2025 (UTC)

Cristian Iulian Onțel (born 5 April 1998 in Bucharest) is a former Romanian professional footballer who played as a midfielder. He made his debut in Liga I in October 2015, in a game against CSMS Iași.

== Career statistics ==
=== Club ===
Club	Season	League		Cup		League Cup		Europe		Other		Total	
Club	Season	Apps	Goals	Apps	Goals	Apps	Goals	Apps	Goals	Apps	Goals	Apps	Goals
Steaua București	2015–16	4	1	0	0	0	0	0	0	0	0	4	1
Steaua București	2016–17	1	0	0	0	0	0	0	0	–		1	0
Total		5	1	0	0	0	0	0	0	0	0	5	1
Steaua II București	2016–17	11	7	–		–		–		–		11	7
Total		11	7	–	–	–	–	–	–	–	–	11	7
Academica Clinceni	2016–17	11	0	–		–		–		–		11	0
Total		11	0	–	–	–	–	–	–	–	–	11	0
Voinţa Saelele	2017–18	0	0	–		–		–		–		0	0
Total		0	0	–	–	–	–	–	–	–	–	0	0
Career Total		27	8	0	0	0	0	0	0	0	0	27	8

Statistics accurate as of match played 1 June 2017

== Honours ==
=== Steaua București ===
- League Cup: 2015–16

=== Afumați ===
- Liga III: 2021–22
