= Sulley Muniru =

Ghanaian professional footballer (born 1992)

Personal information
- Full name: Sulley Ali Sariki Muniru
- Date of birth: 25 October 1992 (age 34)
- Place of birth: Accra, Ghana
- Height: 1.79 m (5 ft 10 1/2 in)
- Position: Midfielder

Youth career
- 1999–2007: Ashanti Akim Missiles
- 2007–2012: Liberty Professionals

Senior career*
Years	Team	Apps	(Gls)
2013–2015	CFR Cluj	46	(0)
2015–2017	Steaua București	37	(1)
2017–2018	Tondela	4	(0)
2018	Yeni Malatyaspor	5	(0)
2019	Dinamo Minsk	10	(0)
2019–2020	Tambov	0	(0)
2020–2021	Asante Kotoko	5	(0)
2021	Minsk	21	(2)
Total		128	(3)

International career
- Ghana U12
- Ghana U15
- * Club domestic league appearances and goals as of 23:54, 13 December 2021 (UTC)

Sulley Ali Sariki Muniru (born 25 October 1992) is a Ghanaian former professional footballer who played as a midfielder. He is the younger brother of former Inter Milan and A.C. Milan player Sulley Muntari.

== Club career ==
=== Youth career ===
Muniru started his youth career at Ashanti Akim Missiles, a youngster club in his hometown Konongo. He helped his college team to win the national championship, being voted the best player. He then played for the youth team of Liberty Professionals where he was the kingpin.

Muniru's urge to also pursue his career in Europe like his elder brother Sulley Muntari grew strongly. At the age of 18, Sulley joined Real Madrid on a trial.

=== CFR Cluj ===
During the 2013 January transfer window, Muniru signed the first professional contract of his career. The midfielder was signed by CFR Cluj as a replacement for playmaker Modou Sougou, who left the club for Marseille. He worn the number 48 on the jersey to celebrate his mother's (née Hajia Kande) birthday.

=== FCSB ===
In June 2015, aged 22, Muniru joined FCSB on a four-year contract, with the Romanian champions paying an undisclosed fee for his transfer. He scored his first goal for the club against AS Trenčín, in the Champions League second qualifying round's second leg.

=== Tondela ===
On 28 November 2017, Muniru joined Tondela on a deal until June 2019. He made a total of four appearances for the club and assisted once.

=== Tambov ===
On 15 August 2019, he joined Russian Premier League club FC Tambov. He was removed by Tambov from their squad on 30 May 2020, after only appearing in one Russian Cup game for the club up to that point.

=== Asante Kotoko ===
Muniru joined Asante Kotoko on 2 November 2020 on a free transfer on a two-year contract. He left the club on 22 January 2021 after making just five appearances. Muniru later thanked the management of Asante Kotoko for his stay at the club and allowing him to leave.

=== Minsk ===
In February 2021, Muniru signed an 8-month deal with FC Minsk as a free agent after his contract with Asante Kotoko was terminated. The deal he signed is to keep him at the club until December 2021 with an option of renewal.

== International career ==
He has represented his country at Under-12 and U-15 levels.

== Career statistics ==
=== Club ===
As of match played 8 April 2017

Club	Season	League		Cup		League Cup		Europe		Other		Total	
Club	Season	Apps	Goals	Apps	Goals	Apps	Goals	Apps	Goals	Apps	Goals	Apps	Goals
CFR Cluj	2012–13	8	0	1	0	–		–		–		9	0
CFR Cluj	2013–14	12	0	1	0	–		–		–		13	0
CFR Cluj	2014–15	26	0	4	0	0	0	4	0	–		34	0
Total		46	0	6	0	0	0	4	0	–	–	56	0
Steaua București	2015–16	17	1	3	0	4	0	6	2	1	0	31	3
Steaua București	2016–17	20	0	1	0	1	0	8	1	–		30	1
Total		37	1	4	0	5	0	14	3	1	0	61	4
Career Total		83	1	10	0	5	0	18	3	1	0	117	4

== Honours ==
=== Club ===
CFR Cluj

- Cupa României: Runner-up 2012–13

Steaua București

- League Cup: 2015–16
- Supercupa României: Runner-up 2015
