= Alexandru Tudorie =

Romanian footballer (born 1996)

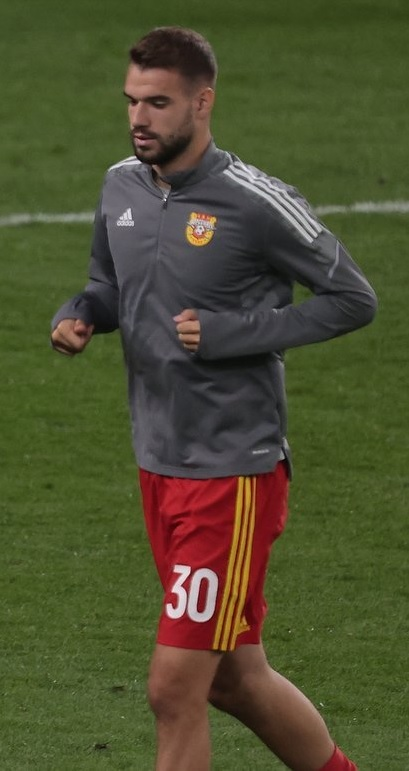
- Tudorie with Arsenal Tula in 2021

Personal information
- Date of birth: 19 March 1996 (age 30)
- Place of birth: Galați, Romania
- Height: 1.92 m (6 ft 4 in)
- Position: Forward

Team information
- Current team: Buriram United
- Number: 99

Youth career
- 2004–2008: Steaua Dunării Galați
- 2009–2010: Gheorghe Hagi Academy
- 2010–2012: Oțelul Galați

Senior career*
| Years | Team | Apps | (Gls) |
| 2012–2013 | Oțelul II Galați | 10 | (6) |
| 2013–2015 | Oțelul Galați | 46 | (6) |
| 2015–2017 | Steaua București | 23 | (2) |
| 2016–2017 | Steaua II București | 11 | (3) |
| 2016 | → Voluntari (loan) | 12 | (4) |
| 2017–2019 | Voluntari | 51 | (17) |
| 2019–2021 | Arsenal Tula | 13 | (1) |
| 2020 | → Voluntari (loan) | 9 | (3) |
| 2020–2021 | → Universitatea Craiova (loan) | 17 | (2) |
| 2022–2023 | Sepsi OSK | 51 | (18) |
| 2023–2024 | Al-Adalah | 11 | (3) |
| 2024 | UTA Arad | 9 | (1) |
| 2024–2025 | Petrolul Ploieşti | 19 | (8) |
| 2025 | Wuhan Three Towns | 26 | (10) |
| 2026 | Guangdong GZ-Power | 12 | (7) |
| 2026– | Buriram United | 2 | (0) |

International career
| 2012 | Romania U17 | 3 | (0) |
| 2013 | Romania U18 | 4 | (0) |
| 2013–2014 | Romania U19 | 11 | (0) |
| 2014–2019 | Romania U21 | 10 | (0) |
- * Club domestic league appearances and goals as of 11 September 2026

Alexandru Tudorie (born 19 March 1996) is a Romanian professional footballer who plays as a forward for Thai League club Buriram United.

== Club career ==
=== Oțelul Galați ===
After two years of playing for the youth team of Oțelul Galați, Tudorie signed his first professional contract in 2012, aged 16. After a year of playing for the reserve team, scoring six goals in ten matches, Tudorie was called up to the first team in 2013. He has played 46 matches and scored six goals for the club. In 2014, he was taken on trial at Borussia Mönchengladbach. Previously, Tudorie has attracted interest from Milan but the clubs couldn't reach an agreement, and also from Sampdoria and Málaga.

=== Steaua and loan to Voluntari ===
On 21 June 2015, Tudorie signed a five-year contract with Romanian champions Steaua București for oror or an undisclosed fee. He was loaned to Voluntari for the 2015-16 Liga I league season. Tudorie returned to Steaua for the 2016–17 Liga I season. He scored three goals in pre-season friendly matches. In the first game of the season, he won the 2015–16 Cupa Ligii final with the team. He played his first UEFA Champions League qualifier match against Sparta Prague.

=== Voluntari ===
On 6 July 2017, he returned to FC Voluntari, this time on permanent basis. At this club, he scored his first career hat-trick against Sepsi Sfântu Gheorghe on 10 September 2017.

=== Arsenal Tula ===
On 4 July 2019, Tudorie signed a long-term contract with Russian Premier League club FC Arsenal Tula.

==== Second loan to Voluntari ====
On 6 February 2020, Tudorie returned to Voluntari once again, on a six-month loan.

==== Loan to Universitatea ====
On 12 August 2020, Tudorie was loaned to Universitatea Craiova for the 2020–21 season, with an option to purchase.

=== Sepsi OSK ===
On 3 January 2022, Tudorie signed a one-and-a-half-year contract with Sepsi OSK.

=== Al-Adalah ===
On 16 July 2023, Tudorie joined Saudi Arabian club Al-Adalah. On 9 January 2024, he was released from his contract.

=== Wuhan Three Towns ===
On 29 January 2025, Chinese Super League club Wuhan Three Towns signed Tudorie from Petrolul Ploiești. On 1 December 2025, Tudorie annouanced his departure after the 2025 season.

=== Guangdong GZ-Power ===
On 7 February 2026, Tudorie joined China League One club Guangdong GZ-Power. On 31 July 2026, the club has terminated the contract with Tudorie.

== Career statistics ==
As of match played on 15 September 2026

Appearances and goals by club, season and competition
| Club | Season | League | | | National cup (Note: Includes Cupa României, Russian Cup, King's Cup, Chinese FA Cup) | | League cup (Note: Includes Cupa Ligii) | | Continental | | Other | | Total | |
| Club | Season | Division | Apps | Goals | Apps | Goals | Apps | Goals | Apps | Goals | Apps | Goals | Apps | Goals |
|---|---|---|---|---|---|---|---|---|---|---|---|---|---|---|
| Oțelul II Galați | 2011–12 | Liga III | 3 | 0 | 0 | 0 | — | | — | | — | | 3 | 0 |
| Oțelul II Galați | 2012–13 | Liga III | 7 | 6 | 0 | 0 | — | | — | | — | | 7 | 6 |
| Oțelul II Galați | Total | | 10 | 6 | 0 | 0 | — | | — | | — | | 10 | 6 |
| Oțelul Galați | 2012–13 | Liga II | 3 | 0 | 1 | 0 | — | | — | | — | | 4 | 0 |
| Oțelul Galați | 2013–14 | Liga II | 19 | 2 | 1 | 0 | — | | — | | — | | 20 | 2 |
| Oțelul Galați | 2014–15 | Liga II | 24 | 4 | 1 | 0 | 2 | 0 | — | | — | | 27 | 4 |
| Oțelul Galați | Total | | 46 | 6 | 3 | 0 | 2 | 0 | — | | — | | 51 | 6 |
| Steaua București | 2015–16 | Liga I | 16 | 1 | 1 | 0 | 1 | 0 | 3 (Note: Appearances in UEFA Champions League) | 0 | 1 (Note: Appearance in Supercupa României) | 0 | 22 | 1 |
| Steaua București | 2016–17 | Liga I | 7 | 1 | 2 | 0 | 2 | 1 | 6 (Note: Four appearances in UEFA Champions League, two appearances in UEFA Europa League) | 0 | — | | 17 | 2 |
| Steaua București | Total | | 23 | 2 | 3 | 0 | 3 | 1 | 9 | 0 | 1 | 0 | 39 | 3 |
| Voluntari (loan) | 2015–16 | Liga I | 12 | 4 | — | | — | | — | | 2 (Note: Appearances in Liga I promotion/relegation play-offs) | 1 | 14 | 5 |
| Voluntari | 2017–18 | Liga I | 15 | 7 | 1 | 0 | — | | — | | — | | 16 | 7 |
| Voluntari | 2018–19 | Liga I | 36 | 10 | 2 | 1 | — | | — | | — | | 38 | 11 |
| Voluntari | Total | | 51 | 17 | 3 | 1 | — | | — | | — | | 54 | 18 |
| Arsenal Tula | 2019–20 | Russian Premier League | 7 | 1 | 2 | 0 | — | | 2 (Note: Appearances in UEFA Europa League) | 0 | — | | 11 | 1 |
| Arsenal Tula | 2021–22 | Russian Premier League | 6 | 0 | 2 | 1 | — | | — | | — | | 8 | 1 |
| Arsenal Tula | Total | | 13 | 1 | 4 | 1 | — | | 2 | 0 | — | | 19 | 2 |
| Voluntari (loan) | 2019–20 | Liga I | 9 | 3 | 0 | 0 | — | | — | | — | | 9 | 3 |
| Universitatea Craiova (loan) | 2020–21 | Liga I | 17 | 2 | 4 | 2 | — | | — | | — | | 21 | 4 |
| Sepsi OSK | 2021–22 | Liga I | 15 | 7 | 3 | 0 | — | | — | | — | | 18 | 7 |
| Sepsi OSK | 2022–23 | Liga I | 36 | 11 | 4 | 1 | — | | 4 (Note: Appearances in UEFA Europa Conference League) | 1 | 1 | 0 | 45 | 13 |
| Sepsi OSK | Total | | 51 | 18 | 7 | 1 | — | | 4 | 1 | 1 | 0 | 63 | 20 |
| Al-Adalah | 2023–24 | Saudi First Division | 11 | 3 | 1 | 0 | — | | — | | — | | 12 | 3 |
| UTA Arad | 2023–24 | Liga I | 9 | 1 | — | | — | | — | | — | | 9 | 1 |
| Petrolul Ploiești | 2024–25 | Liga I | 19 | 8 | 2 | 1 | — | | — | | — | | 21 | 9 |
| Wuhan Three Towns | 2025 | Chinese Super League | 26 | 10 | 1 | 0 | — | | — | | — | | 27 | 10 |
| Guangdong GZ-Power | 2026 | China League One | 12 | 7 | 1 | 0 | — | | — | | — | | 13 | 7 |
| Buriram United | 2026–27 | Thai League | 2 | 0 | 0 | 0 | — | | 1 (Note: Appearances in AFC Champions League Elite) | 0 | — | | 3 | 0 |
| Total | | | 311 | 88 | 29 | 6 | 5 | 1 | 16 | 1 | 4 | 1 | 365 | 97 |

== Honours ==
Steaua București

- Supercupa României runner-up: 2015
- Cupa Ligii: 2015–16

Universitatea Craiova

- Cupa României: 2020–21

Sepsi OSK

- Cupa României: 2021–22, 2022–23
- Supercupa României: 2022

=== Individual ===
- DigiSport Liga I Player of the Month: September 2017
