= 2015 Supercupa României =

- Event: 2015 Supercupa României
Steaua București	ASA Târgu Mureș
Liga I	Liga I
0	1
- Date: 8 July 2015
- Venue: Stadionul Farul, Constanța
- Man of the Match: Mircea Axente
- Referee: Radu Petrescu
- Attendance: 13,300
- Weather: Clear

The 2015 Supercupa României was the 17th edition of Romania's season opener cup competition. The game was contested between Liga I title holders, Steaua București, and 2nd place holders, ASA Târgu Mureș. It was played at Stadionul Farul in Constanța in July. Târgu Mureș won the trophy for the first time in history, after defeating Steaua, 1–0.

== Match ==
=== Details ===
8 July 2015
21:00 EET (UTC+02)

Steaua București	0–1	ASA Târgu Mureș
	Report; Report	Axente 63'

Farul, Constanța
Referee: Radu Petrescu

Steaua București	Târgu Mureș

GK	12	(Romania) Valentin Cojocaru
RB	2	(Romania) Cornel Râpă
CB	30	(Romania) Gabriel Tamaș
CB	33	(Cape Verde) Fernando Varela (c)
LB	13	(Romania) Alin Toșca
DM	26	(Romania) Ionuț Neagu	(substituted off) 68'
DM	11	(Ghana) Sulley Muniru	(substituted off) 74'
RW	80	(Romania) Gabriel Iancu	(substituted off) 44'
AM	10	(Romania) Nicolae Stanciu (yellow card) 70'
LW	7	(Romania) Alexandru Chipciu
FW	17	(Romania) Alexandru Tudorie
Substitutes:
GK	1	(Romania) Florin Niță
DF	6	(Romania) Paul Papp
LB	16	(Brazil) Guilherme
DM	21	(Netherlands) Nicandro Breeveld
RW	27	(Romania) Răzvan Grădinaru	(substituted on) 44'
CM	23	(Algeria) Aymen Tahar	(substituted on) 68'
AM	19	(Romania) Vlad Mihalcea	(substituted on) 74'
Manager:
(Italy) Massimo Pedrazzini

GK	33	(Romania) Eduard Stăncioiu
CB	23	(Romania) Marius Constantin (yellow card) 68'
RB	8	(Poland) Paweł Golański (yellow card) 54'	(substituted off) 83'
CB	5	(Romania) Florin Bejan
DM	6	(Romania) Gabriel Mureșan (c) (yellow card) 65'
CM	78	(Senegal) Ousmane N'Doye
LB	19	(Argentina) Pablo Brandán
CM	25	(Argentina) Nicolás Gorobsov
RW	9	(Romania) Dacian Varga (yellow card) 45'	(substituted off) 60'
LW	7	(Netherlands) Romario Kortzorg (yellow card) 69'	(substituted off) 90+3'
FW	20	(Romania) Mircea Axente
Substitutes:
GK	95	(Romania) Béla Fejér
FW	31	(Bulgaria) Miroslav Manolov	(substituted on) 90+3'
RB	44	(Romania) Sergiu Hanca	(substituted on) 83'
DF	3	(Montenegro) Saša Balić
FW	11	(Spain) Rubén Jurado
MF	14	(Romania) Dan Bucșa
MF	21	(Netherlands) Luís Pedro	(substituted on) 60'
Manager:
(Romania) Dan Petrescu

Man of the match

- (Romania) Mircea Axente

Match rules

- 90 minutes.
- 30 minutes of extra-time if necessary.
- Penalty shoot-out if scores still level.
- Seven named substitutes.
- Maximum of three substitutions.

== See also ==
- 2015–16 Liga I
- 2015–16 Cupa României
