= Cristian Bocșan =

Romanian footballer

Personal information
- Date of birth: 31 January 1995 (age 31)
- Place of birth: Timișoara, Romania
- Height: 1.95 m (6 ft 5 in)
- Position: Centre back

Team information
- Current team: Ghiroda
- Number: 4

Youth career
- –2012: Politehnica Timișoara
- 2012–2013: ACS Poli Timișoara

Senior career*
Years	Team	Apps	(Gls)
2013–2018	ACS Poli Timișoara	66	(0)
2018	→ Ripensia Timișoara (loan)	14	(1)
2019–2020	Ghiroda	39	(3)
2021–2024	ASU Politehnica Timișoara	71	(2)
2024–2025	CSM Reșița	18	(1)
2025–	Ghiroda	0	(0)

International career
2013	Romania U18	1	(0)
2014	Romania U19	4	(0)
- * Club domestic league appearances and goals as of 6 May 2025

Cristian Bocșan (born 31 January 1995) is a Romanian professional footballer who plays as a centre back for Liga III club Ghiroda.

== Club career ==
After playing coming through the junior ranks and playing for the club in the second league, Bocșan made his debut in the Romanian Liga I in the 2015-2016 season, in an away match against CFR Cluj.

== Honours ==
ACS Poli Timișoara

- Liga II: 2014–15
