= Marko Momčilović =

Serbian footballer

Personal information
- Date of birth: 11 June 1987 (age 39)
- Place of birth: Leskovac, SR Serbia, SFR Yugoslavia
- Height: 1.86 m (6 ft 1 in)
- Position: Defender

Youth career
- Dubočica
- –2005: Radnički Beograd

Senior career*
Years	Team	Apps	(Gls)
2005–2006	Radnički Beograd		
2006	Bobište		
2007	Dubočica	26	(10)
2008–2013	Javor Ivanjica	96	(4)
2013–2016	Pandurii Târgu Jiu	86	(9)
2016–2020	FCSB	72	(7)
2020–2021	Radnički Niš	11	(0)
2021	Zlatibor Čajetina	15	(2)
2021–2022	Javor Ivanjica	35	(2)
2022–2025	Dubočica	86	(4)
Total		427	(38)
- * Club domestic league appearances and goals

Marko Momčilović (Serbian Cyrillic: Марко Момчиловић; born 11 June 1987) is a Serbian former professional footballer who played as a defender.

== Club career ==
=== Javor Ivanjica ===
After playing for Dubočica in the Serbian League East, Momčilović was transferred to newly promoted Serbian SuperLiga club Javor Ivanjica in the summer of 2008. He rarely played in his initial two seasons at the club (2008–2010), making just 10 league appearances. During the 2010–11 season, Momčilović became a first-team regular, scoring two goals in 29 league games. He would go on to establish himself as one of the league's best left-backs over the following years (2011–2013). Overall, Momčilović made 96 league appearances and scored four goals in his five seasons with the club.

=== Pandurii Târgu Jiu ===
In June 2013, Momčilović moved to Romania and signed a three-year contract with Liga I side Pandurii Târgu Jiu. He immediately became a first-team regular, making 31 league appearances and scoring four goals in his debut season at the club. Momčilović also played 12 matches in the 2013–14 edition of the UEFA Europa League, managing to score in a 1–1 group stage draw with Portuguese side Paços de Ferreira on 3 October 2013.

=== FCSB ===
On 12 January 2016, FCSB reached an agreement with Pandurii for the transfer of Momčilović, who signed a three-year contract with the club and was given the number 15 shirt. He was named in the Liga I Team of the Season in both 2016–17 and 2017–18. After struggling with injuries over the next two years, Momčilović left the club after his contract expired on 30 June 2020.

== Career statistics ==
Appearances and goals by club, season and competition
Club	Season	League			National Cup (Note: Includes Serbian Cup, Cupa României)		League Cup (Note: Includes Cupa Ligii)		Europe		Other		Total	
Club	Season	Division	Apps	Goals	Apps	Goals	Apps	Goals	Apps	Goals	Apps	Goals	Apps	Goals
Radnički Beograd	2005–06	Serbian League Belgrade	?	?	?	?	—		—		—		?	?
Bobište	2006–07	Zone League East	?	?	?	?	—		—		—		?	?
Dubočica	2007–08	Serbian League East	26	10	—		—		—		—		26	10
Javor Ivanjica	2008–09	Serbian SuperLiga	4	0			—		—		—		4	0
Javor Ivanjica	2009–10	Serbian SuperLiga	6	0			—		—		—		6	0
Javor Ivanjica	2010–11	Serbian SuperLiga	29	2			—		—		—		29	2
Javor Ivanjica	2011–12	Serbian SuperLiga	30	0	3	0	—		—		—		33	0
Javor Ivanjica	2012–13	Serbian SuperLiga	27	2	5	1	—		—		—		32	3
Javor Ivanjica	Total		96	4	8	1	—		—		—		104	5
Pandurii Târgu Jiu	2013–14	Liga I	31	4	1	0	—		12 (Note: Appearances in UEFA Europa League)	1	—		44	5
Pandurii Târgu Jiu	2014–15	Liga I	33	4	3	0	5	0	—		—		41	4
Pandurii Târgu Jiu	2015–16	Liga I	22	1	0	0	1	0	—		—		23	1
Pandurii Târgu Jiu	Total		86	9	4	0	6	0	12	1	—		108	10
FCSB	2015–16	Liga I	8	1	2	0	2	1	—		—		12	2
FCSB	2016–17	Liga I	32	2	1	0	2	0	9 (Note: Four appearances in UEFA Champions League, five appearances and one goal in UEFA Europa League)	1	—		44	3
FCSB	2017–18	Liga I	28	4	0	0	—		6 (Note: Four appearances in UEFA Champions League, two appearances in UEFA Europa League)	0	—		34	4
FCSB	2018–19	Liga I	3	0	0	0	—		2	0	—		5	0
FCSB	2019–20	Liga I	1	0	0	0	—		0	0	—		1	0
FCSB	Total		72	7	3	0	4	1	17	1	—		96	9
Radnički Niš	2020–21	Serbian SuperLiga	11	0	2	0	—		—		—		13	0
Zlatibor Čajetina	2020–21	Serbian SuperLiga	15	2	—		—		—		—		15	2
Javor Ivanjica	2021–22	Serbian First League	35	2	2	2	—		—		—		37	4
Dubočica	2022–23	Serbian League East	33	3			—		—		—		33	3
Dubočica	2023–24	Serbian First League	22	1	0	0	—		—		—		22	1
Dubočica	2024–25	Serbian First League	26	0	1	0	—		—		—		27	0
Dubočica	2025–26	Serbian First League	5	0	0	0	—		—		—		5	0
Dubočica	Total		86	4	1	0	—		—		—		87	4
Career total			427	38	20	3	10	1	29	2	—		486	44

== Honours ==
=== Club ===
Pandurii Târgu Jiu

- Cupa Ligii runner-up: 2014–15

FCSB

- Cupa României: 2019–20
- Cupa Ligii: 2015–16

Dubočica

- Serbian League East: 2022–23

=== Individual ===
- Liga I Team of the Season: 2016–17, 2017–18
- Liga I Team of the Championship play-offs: 2017–18,
