= Bogdan Măcriș =

Romanian footballer

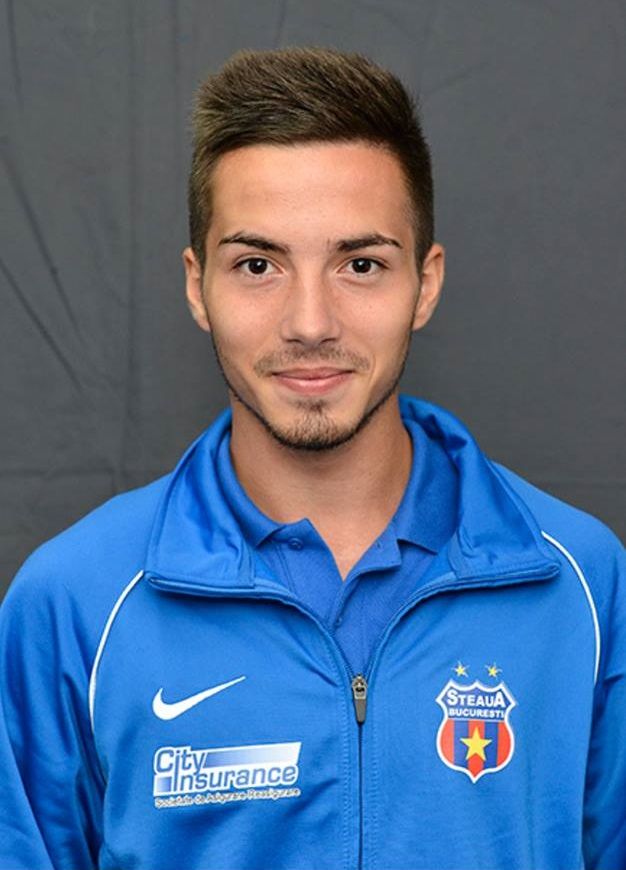

Personal information
- Full name: Bogdan Constantin Junior Măcriș Dan
- Date of birth: 28 January 1997 (age 29)
- Place of birth: București, Romania
- Position: Striker

Team information
- Current team: DP Cornu
- Number: 97

Youth career
- 2007–2016: FCSB

Senior career*
Years	Team	Apps	(Gls)
2016–2017	FCSB	0	(0)
2016	→ Berceni (loan)	2	(0)
2017–2018	Steaua București		
2018–2019	ASD Valledolmo		
2019–2020	Muscelul Câmpulung	8	(5)
2020–	DP Cornu	87	(45)
2025–2026	→ CSO Boldești-Scăeni (loan)	25	(6)
- * Club domestic league appearances and goals as of 18 June 2026

Bogdan Junior Măcriș (born 28 January 1997) is a Romanian professional footballer who plays as striker.

== Career statistics ==
Statistics accurate as of match played 17 October 2015

Club	Season	League		Cup		League Cup		Europe		Other		Total	
Club	Season	Apps	Goals	Apps	Goals	Apps	Goals	Apps	Goals	Apps	Goals	Apps	Goals
FCSB	2014–15	0	0	1	0	0	0	0	0	0	0	1	0
FCSB	2015–16	0	0	0	0	1	0	0	0	0	0	1	0
FCSB	Total	0	0	1	0	1	0	0	0	0	0	2	0
Career total		0	0	1	0	1	0	0	0	0	0	2	0
