= Grégory Tadé =

French footballer (born 1986)

Personal information
- Date of birth: 2 September 1986 (age 40)
- Place of birth: Nantes, France
- Height: 1.82 m (6 ft 0 in)
- Position: Forward

Youth career
- 2003–2006: Orvault Sports

Senior career*
Years	Team	Apps	(Gls)
2006–2007	Forfar Athletic	23	(3)
2007–2009	Stranraer	46	(17)
2009	Clyde	13	(0)
2009–2011	Raith Rovers	68	(13)
2011–2012	Inverness Caledonian Thistle	36	(9)
2012–2013	St Johnstone	36	(4)
2013–2015	CFR Cluj	50	(21)
2015–2016	Steaua București	24	(4)
2016–2017	Qatar SC	11	(11)
2017–2018	Maccabi Petah Tikva	25	(4)
2018	Dinamo București	0	(0)
2021–2022	Clyde	24	(1)
2022–2023	Cumbernauld Colts	22	(1)
Total		378	(88)
- * Club domestic league appearances and goals

Grégory Tadé (born 2 September 1986) is a French former professional footballer who played as a forward.

Tadé started his senior career by featuring for various teams in Scotland, of which Inverness Caledonian Thistle and St Johnstone in the Scottish Premier League, where he amassed over 70 appearances combined.

After seven years in the latter country, Tadé moved to Romanian side CFR Cluj in 2013. He finished his second season at the team as the Liga I top goalscorer, which prompted a transfer to FC Steaua București. He failed to make an impact in the capital, and then spent his late years in Qatar, Israel and back in Scotland.

== Career ==
=== Scotland ===
Tadé began his career with Orvault Sports Football in his native France, but moved to Scotland in 2006 to join Forfar Athletic. He was not given a new contract at Forfar, and joined Stranraer in July 2007. In a match with East Fife in January 2008, Tadé was the victim of racial abuse, with opposing player Kevin Fotheringham alleged to have made racist remarks in his direction.

Tadé made the step up to the Scottish Football League First Division on 24 January 2009, signing for Clyde, after making 61 appearances in total for Stranraer, scoring 23 goals. He made his debut on the same day, playing 75 minutes in Clyde's 2–0 victory over Ross County. Tadé was released by Clyde in June 2009 along with the rest of the out of contract players, due to the club's financial position. He went on to sign for newly promoted Raith Rovers. He became a fan favourite and helped the club to the Scottish Cup semi-final and the next season to second place in the Scottish First Division.

Tadé refused contract offers by Raith Rovers at the end of the 2010–11 season and signed for Inverness Caledonian Thistle. He made his Inverness debut against Motherwell at Fir Park on 23 July.

Tadé signed for St Johnstone under freedom of contract in June 2012. He scored his first goal for St Johnstone in their Europa League qualifier against Eskişehirspor on 26 July 2012.

=== Romania ===
In June 2013, Tadé penned down a three-year deal with Romanian team CFR Cluj. Two years later, he moved to reigning Liga I champions FC Steaua București, but was unable to bring his form to the capital and only scored four times in the league during his only season at the club. On 19 July 2016, his contract was terminated and he became a free agent.

=== Qatar SC and Maccabi Petah Tikva ===
On 20 July 2016, Tadé signed for Qatar Stars League side Qatar Sports Club.

In November 2018, Tadé returned to Romania to join former rivals from Dinamo București. He only appeared in an exhibition loss to Concordia Chiajna, after which the club announced that he would undergo a medical intervention in Turkey. His contract was cancelled the following month, thus never featuring for Dinamo in an official match.

=== Return to Scotland ===
Tadé returned to Scottish football to sign on amateur terms with former club Clyde in July 2021. On 3 May 2022, he was one of ten players released by Clyde at the end of the 2021–22 season. Tadé joined Lowland League club Cumbernauld Colts in the summer of 2022. On 19 May 2023, it was announced that he was to exit Cumbernauld Colts and retire from professional football.

== Personal life ==
Tadé is of Ivorian descent, and his cousin Armand Oné was also a professional footballer.

Tade is a Clyde FC supporter, through family connections.

== Career statistics ==
As of match played 1 May 2016

Appearances and goals by club, season and competition
Club	Season	League		National cup		League cup		Continental		Other		Total	
Club	Season	Apps	Goals	Apps	Goals	Apps	Goals	Apps	Goals	Apps	Goals	Apps	Goals
Forfar Athletic	2006–07	23	3	0	0	–		–		–		23	3
Stranraer	2007–08					–		–		–		23	3
Stranraer	2008–09			1	0	1	0	–		–			
Stranraer	Total	46	17	1	0	1	0	0	0	0	0	48	17
Clyde (loan)	2008–09	13	0	0	0	–		–		–		13	0
Raith Rovers	2009–10	32	5	8	2	3	1	–		–		43	8
Raith Rovers	2010–11	36	8	1	0	4	3	–		–		41	11
Raith Rovers	Total	68	13	9	2	7	4	0	0	0	0	84	19
Inverness Caledonian Thistle	2011–12	36	9	3	0	1	0	–		–		40	9
St Johnstone	2012–13	36	3	2	1	2	0	1	1	–		41	5
CFR Cluj	2013–14	22	2	0	0	–		–		–		22	2
CFR Cluj	2014–15	27	18	4	2	0	0	3	0	–		34	20
CFR Cluj	2015–16	1	1	–		–		–		–		1	1
CFR Cluj	Total	50	21	4	2	0	0	3	0	0	0	57	23
Steaua București	2015–16	24	4	5	1	2	1	6	1	–		37	7
Career total		296	70	24	6	13	5	10	2	0	0	343	83

== Honours ==
Steaua București

- Cupa Ligii: 2015–16

Individual

- Liga I top scorer: 2014–15
