= Vlad Mihalcea =

Romanian footballer

Personal information
- Full name: Vlad Dumitru Mihalcea
- Date of birth: 28 October 1998 (age 27)
- Place of birth: Brașov, Romania
- Height: 1.71 m (5 ft 7 in)
- Position: Attacking midfielder

Youth career
- 2007–2015: FC Brașov

Senior career*
Years	Team	Apps	(Gls)
2015–2018	FCSB	6	(0)
2017	→ ACS Poli Timișoara (loan)	1	(0)
2017–2018	→ Academica Clinceni (loan)	34	(3)
2018–2019	Academica Clinceni	24	(6)
2019	Voluntari	2	(0)
2019–2020	Universitatea Cluj	4	(0)
2020–2021	Aerostar Bacău	10	(0)
2021–2022	FC Brașov	22	(4)
2022–2023	Concordia Chiajna	11	(2)
2023–2024	Gloria Bistrița-Năsăud	27	(7)
2024–2025	CSU Alba Iulia	15	(5)
2025	AFC Câmpulung Muscel	4	(0)

International career
2014–2015	Romania U17	7	(1)
- * Club domestic league appearances and goals as of 20 September 2025

Vlad Dumitru Mihalcea (born 28 October 1998) is a Romanian professional footballer who plays as an attacking midfielder.

== Club career ==
=== Steaua București ===
After playing for FC Brașov's youth teams for a few years, Mihalcea signed his first professional contract in June 2015, when he put pen-to-paper on a 6-year contract with Romanian champions Steaua București. He had a great start for a youngster in pre-season, getting 2 assists and scoring once in 5 friendly matches.

== Honours ==
Steaua București

- Cupa Ligii: 2015–16

Gloria Bistrița

- Liga III: 2023–24
