= Massimo Pedrazzini =

Italian football coach and former player (born 1958)

Personal information
- Date of birth: 3 February 1958 (age 68)
- Place of birth: Milan, Italy
- Height: 1.82 m (6 ft 0 in)
- Position: Midfielder

Team information
- Current team: Romania U17 (head coach)

Youth career
- 1969–1975: Milan

Senior career*
Years	Team	Apps	(Gls)
1975–1976	Cantù	25	(1)
1976–1979	Varese	70	(2)
1979–1981	Ternana	67	(5)
1981–1982	Sambenedettese	25	(0)
1982–1983	Triestina	28	(2)
1983–1984	Messina	28	(2)
1984–1985	Catanzaro	38	(0)
1985–1987	Salernitana	57	(3)
1987–1989	Mantova	55	(3)
1989–1991	Fiorenzuola	42	(15)
Total		435	(33)

International career
1977	Italy U20	?	(?)

Managerial career
- 1991–1996: Milan (youth)
- 1996–1997: Inter Milan (youth)
- 1997–1998: Pro Sesto (youth)
- 1998–2000: Inter Milan (youth)
- 2000–2001: Inter Milan (assistant)
- 2001–2002: Hellas Verona (youth)
- 2002–2003: Nocerina (assistant)
- 2003: Monza (youth)
- 2003–2004: Monza
- 2004–2005: Steaua București (assistant)
- 2005–2006: Red Star Belgrade (assistant)
- 2006: Gaziantepspor (assistant)
- 2007: Al Ain (assistant)
- 2007: Steaua București (caretaker)
- 2007–2009: Steaua București (assistant)
- 2009: Steaua București (caretaker)
- 2009: Palermo (assistant)
- 2010–2011: Al-Sadd (assistant)
- 2011–2012: Al Ain (assistant)
- 2012–2013: Al Nassr (assistant)
- 2013–2015: Steaua București (youth center technical director)
- 2015: Steaua București (assistant)
- 2017–2019: FCSB (academy manager)
- 2020–2021: Viitorul Constanța (methodology-evaluation director)
- 2021–2022: Farul Constanța (methodology-evaluation director)
- 2022–2024: Romania U17
- 2024–: Romania women
- * Club domestic league appearances and goals

Massimo Pedrazzini (born 3 February 1958) is an Italian football coach and former player.

== Career ==
=== Player ===
A former midfielder who mostly played with Serie B and Serie C1 clubs, he won a total of four promotions in his playing career, with Triestina, Catanzaro (both to Serie B), Mantova (promotion to Serie C1) and Fiorenzuola (promotion to Serie C2).

== Coach ==
He then became a football coach, working from 1991 to 1996 within AC Milan's youth system. In 2002–03, he enjoyed his first head coaching experience at the helm of Serie C2's Monza, and later joined Walter Zenga's coaching staff, serving as his assistant with Steaua București, Red Star Belgrade, Gaziantepspor and Al Ain FC. In September 2007 he was appointed as interim head coach following Gheorghe Hagi's resignations. He was successively dismissed on late October and replaced by Marius Lăcătuş, but accepted to stay at Steaua as assistant coach. He then served as caretaker manager for the final three games of the 2008–09 season, after Marius Lăcătuş stepped down as Steaua boss in May 2009.

In June 2009 he agreed to return working alongside Walter Zenga, becoming assistant coach of Sicilian Serie A club Palermo, which he left later in November after Zenga was dismissed.

== Honours ==
=== Player ===
US Triestina Calcio

- Serie C1: 1982–83

US Catanzaro

- Serie C1: 1984–85

AC Mantova

- Serie C2: 1987–88

US Fiorenzuola

- Serie D: 1989–90

=== Manager ===
Steaua București

- Romanian Supercup: Runner-up 2015

== Sources ==
- "Massimo Pedrazzini – Pagina Personala" (in Romanian). Steaua București. Archived from the original on 12 September 2007.
- "FIORENZUOLA:Meteore, Campioni e toloni (per non dimenticare)" (in Italian). PiacenzaCalcio.Com.
