= Marius Avram =

Romanian football referee

- Full name: Ionuț Marius Avram
- Born: 9 August 1979 (age 47); Bucharest, Romania

Domestic
Years	League	Role
2007–2020	Liga I	Referee

International
Years	League	Role
2010–2020	FIFA listed	Referee

Ionuț Marius Avram (born 9 August 1979) is a Romanian former professional football referee who officiated primarily in the Liga I from 2007 to 2020, as well as for FIFA as a FIFA international referee from 2010 to 2020.

Avram became a FIFA referee in 2010. He has refereed at 2014 FIFA World Cup qualifiers, beginning with the match between Kazakhstan and Republic of Ireland.

He retired from refereeing on 17 December 2020, and the last refereed match was FC Dinamo - CFR Cluj (Liga I).
