= ASA 2013 Târgu Mureș =

Association football club in Romania

Târgu Mureș
- Full name: Asociația Sportivă Ardealul 2013 Târgu Mureș
- Nicknames: Roș-albaștrii (The Red-Blues); Mureșenii (The Mureș Men)
- Founded: 2008; 18 years ago as FCM Târgu Mureș
- Dissolved: 2018; 8 years ago
- Ground: Trans-Sil
- Capacity: 8,200
Home colours	Away colours	Third colours

Asociația Sportivă Ardealul 2013 Târgu Mureș, commonly known as ASA Târgu Mureș or simply as Târgu Mureș, was a Romanian professional football club based in Târgu Mureș, Mureș County, which last played in the Liga II. During its short ten-year history, the team managed several notable domestic performances.

Originally founded in 2008 as FCM Târgu Mureș, it changed its name five years later to ASA Târgu Mureș. The new acronym and the red and blue equipment were meant to closely resemble the identity of one of the former clubs in the city, which was dissolved in 2005. ASA Târgu Mureș won its first major trophy after defeating FC Steaua București in the 2015 Supercupa României, having earned its place in the competition after coming second in the Liga I championship the previous campaign.

Roș-albaștrii recorded their only European appearance in the 2015–16 edition of the UEFA Europa League, when they were eliminated by Saint-Étienne in the third qualifying round. In January 2018, the club announced its withdrawal from the second division after a period marked by insolvency and financial problems, announcing a future reorganization from the summer of that year.

== History ==
=== Early years ===
The team was founded in 2008 as FCM Târgu Mureș, becoming the city's main football team, as a successor to CS Târgu Mureș (dissolved in 1960), Mureșul Târgu Mureș (dissolved in 1964), and the original ASA Târgu Mureș (dissolved in 2005). They bought a spot from the newly promoted Unirea Sânnicolau Mare, consequently playing in the 2008–09 Liga II. FCM outperformed the predictions and played well throughout the season, winning 16 games and drawing 9, while scoring 54 goals and receiving 27, the fewest in the Seria II. At the end of the season, the team was very close to promote to the Liga I, finishing third with 57 points.

The following season, the club finished first in their series with 69 points, winning 20 games, drawing 9 and losing 3. The team scored 52 goals and allowed 20 (the fewest goals received in their series, like the year before) and was promoted for the first time in its history to the Liga I. Eighteen years had passed since the city's last presence in the Romanian top football league (1991–92 season with ASA).

=== Promotion to Liga I ===
FCM debuted in Liga I by finishing 9th in the table, the same number of points as the defending champions, CFR Cluj, and Astra Ploiești. Ioan Ovidiu Sabău led the team to a fantastic streak, at ten points behind Gaz Metan Mediaș, the last team who took an UEFA Europa League spot.

The next season, the club failed to maintain its position in the Liga I, finishing 15th, the highest place in the relegation zone. One team from the second division, Politehnica Timișoara, did not receive its licence for the first league, so the Romanian Football Federation had to decide whether to keep the first team under the relegation line, FCM Târgu Mureș, or to promote the team placed third in the Seria II, behind Timișoara. Finally, the FRF decided that Gaz Metan Severin should be promoted, thus FCM ended up being relegated.

=== Return to Liga II ===
The board of directors fixed as an objective for the 2012–13 season the promotion back to the Liga I. However, the team couldn't keep the rhythm set by Corona Brașov and ACS Poli Timișoara, and after the first half of the season it was behind the earlier mentioned two in the league table. The second half of the season was even worse, FCM ending fifth in the West Division of Liga II, ten points behind ACS Poli, which took the second promoting place.

=== Name change and back to first division ===
In 2013, the club changed its name from Fotbal Club Municipal Târgu Mureș to Asociația Sportivă Ardealul 2013 Târgu Mureș. At the end of 2013–14 Liga II they finished second and entered Liga I for the first time with the new name.

==== 2014–15 season ====
On 16 July 2014, the team debuted in Cupa Ligii (English: League Cup), Romania's secondary club football tournament, and lost their first ever match in the competition against CSMS Iași. It was an extraordinary season for "The Red-Blues", securing their very first qualification in a European competition, by finishing second, and winning against two-time defending champions Steaua București both home and away. After the away victory over Steaua, ASA seized the first place and was close to obtain a historical league title, however, after a 1–3 loss to Astra Giurgiu, the team fell back to the second place. However, ASA Târgu Mureș kept chances to winning the championship after Steaua's 0–0 draw against CSMS Iași, having to win against relegated Oțelul Galați. Mureș side went to a 1–0 lead, but lost the title after Oțelul turned the score to 1–2.

==== 2015–16 season ====
On 9 July 2015, ASA earned a spot in the Supercupa României as championship runners-up last season. The club faced FC Steaua București, which won the domestic treble (Championship, Cup and League Cup), and defeated them 1–0, after a goal scored in the 63rd minute by Mircea Axente, who also received the "Man of the Match" award. This was the club's first major trophy. The team was led by manager Dan Petrescu, who resigned after only one match, due to the financial problems which had appeared in recent days. Shortly after, Vasile Miriuță was revealed as the new coach.

On July 17, it was announced that ASA would face AS Saint-Étienne in the UEFA Europa League third qualifying round. The club only managed to win the second leg in France 2–1, and was eliminated after 2–4 on aggregate. Târgu Mureș signed former Romanian international Adrian Mutu for the latter half of the 2015–16 season, being his last team of his playing career.

== Chronology of names ==
Name	Period	Note
Fotbal Club Municipal Târgu Mureș (FCM Târgu Mureș)	2008–2013	Colours: Blue and Orange; Ground: Stadionul Trans-Sil
Asociaţia Sportivă Ardealul 2013 Târgu Mureș (ASA Târgu Mureș)	2013–2018	Colours: Blue and Red

== Honours ==
=== Domestic ===
==== Leagues ====
- Liga I
  - Runners-up (1): 2014–15
- Liga II
  - Winners (1): 2009–10
  - Runners-up (1): 2013–14

==== Cups ====
- Supercupa României
  - Winners (1): 2015

=== Other performances ===
==== Domestic ====
- Appearances in Liga I: 4
- Appearances in Cupa Ligii: 2
- Semi-finalists of 2015–16 Cupa României

==== European ====
- Appearances in European Competitions: 1
- Biggest European win: 2–1 AS Saint-Étienne in (2015–16 season)
- Third qualifying round of 2015–16 UEFA Europa League

== European record ==
Notes for the table below:

- 3Q: Third qualifying round

Season	Competition	Round	Club	Home	Away	Aggregate
2015–16	UEFA Europa League	3Q	(France) Saint-Étienne	0–3	2–1	2–4

=== League history ===
Season	Tier	Division	Place	Cupa României
2017–18	2	Liga II	19th (R)	Round of 32
2016–17	1	Liga I	14th (R)	Round of 16
2015–16	1	Liga I	6th	Semi-finals
2014–15	1	Liga I	2nd	Quarter-finals
2013–14	2	Liga II (Seria II)	2nd (P)	Fifth Round
2012–13	2	Liga II (Seria II)	5th	Round of 32
2011–12	1	Liga I	15th (R)	Round of 16
2010–11	1	Liga I	9th	Round of 16
2009–10	2	Liga II (Seria II)	1st (C, P)	Fifth Round
2008–09	2	Liga II (Seria II)	3rd	Round of 32
