= 2015–16 Cupa Ligii =

Tournament details
- Country: Romania
- Teams: 14

Final positions
- Champions: FCSB
- Runners-up: Concordia Chiajna

The 2015–16 Cupa Ligii was the second official season of the Cupa Ligii. Steaua București won the tournament for the second time in a row after defeating Concordia Chiajna in the final.

All times are CEST (UTC+2).

== Schedule ==
- Qualifying Round: 9–10 September 2015
- Quarter-finals: 14–15 October 2015
- First leg of semi-finals: 9–10 March 2016
- Second leg of semi-finals: 13–14 April 2016
- Final: 17 July 2016

== Prize money ==
- Winner: €265,000
- Runner-up: €165,000
- Semi-final: €50,000
- Quarter-final: €25,000
- Qualifying Round: €20,000

== Qualifying round ==
At this stage, all teams participate in 2015–16 Liga I season except for No. 1 (FC Steaua București) and 2 (ASA Târgu Mureș) 2014–15 Liga I season which directly qualified for the quarterfinals. Thus in this phase will be 12 teams will be divided in 6 games. The winners of those matches will qualify for the quarterfinals.

The teams qualified in this phase are:

- FC Astra Giurgiu

- FC Botoșani

- CFR Cluj

- CS Concordia Chiajna

- FC Dinamo București

- CSM Studențesc Iași

- CS Pandurii Târgu Jiu

- FC Petrolul Ploiești

- ACS Poli Timișoara

- Universitatea Craiova

- FC Viitorul Constanța

- FC Voluntari

All matches were played on 9–10 September 2015

9 September 2015	Concordia Chiajna	3–0	FC Botoșani	Stadionul Concordia, Chiajna
16:30	Cristescu 1'; Răducanu 81'; Purece 90+1'			Referee: Gabriel Mladinovici (Bucharest)

9 September 2015	ACS Poli Timișoara	1–0	Petrolul Ploiești	Dan Păltinișanu, Timișoara
19:00	Elek 67'			Referee: Adrian Cojocaru (Galati)

9 September 2015	CSM Studențesc Iași	0–1	CFR Cluj	Emil Alexandrescu, Iași
21:45			López 44'	Referee: Marcel Bîrsan (Bucharest)

10 September 2015	FC Voluntari	0–2	Astra Giurgiu	Dinamo, Bucharest
16:30			Gouriye 6'; Alibec 73'	Referee: George Radulescu (Bucharest)

10 September 2015	Viitorul Constanța	0–0 (a.e.t.) (9–8 p)	Universitatea Craiova	Orășenesc, Ovidiu
19:00				Referee: Marian Balaci (Drobeta-Turnu Severin)
	Penalties
	Benzar (penalty scored); Chițu (penalty scored); Achim (penalty scored); Casap (penalty missed); Aganović (penalty scored); Nicolița (penalty scored); Filip (penalty scored); Boli (penalty scored); Gavra (penalty scored); Ganea (penalty missed); Albuț (penalty scored)		Ivan (penalty scored); Popov (penalty scored); Zlatinski (penalty scored); Ferfelea (penalty missed); Tîrnăcop (penalty scored); Madson (penalty scored); Herghelegiu (penalty scored); Kay (penalty scored); Bancu (penalty scored); Măzărache (penalty missed); Straton (penalty missed)

10 September 2015	Pandurii Târgu Jiu	0–2	Dinamo București	Municipal, Drobeta-Turnu Severin
21:45			Palić 60'; Filipetto 62' (o.g.)	Referee: Alexandru Tudor (Bucharest)

== Quarter-finals ==
At this stage, 8 teams qualified:

FC Steaua București – 1st place 2014–15 Liga I season

ASA Târgu Mureș – 2nd place 2014–15 Liga I season

the 6 teams that won in Qualifying Round

- FC Astra Giurgiu

- CS Concordia Chiajna

- CFR Cluj

- ACS Poli Timișoara

- FC Viitorul Constanța

- FC Dinamo București

These teams will be divided in four matches. The winners of those matches will qualify for the semifinals. All matches were played on 14–15 October 2015

14 October 2015	Concordia Chiajna	1–0	ASA Târgu Mureș	Stadionul Concordia, Chiajna
18:15	Balaur 38' (o.g.)			Referee: Adrian Cojocaru (Galați)

14 October 2015	Dinamo București	2–0	CFR Cluj	Dinamo, Bucharest
21:00	Essombé 22'; Rotariu 55'			Referee: Alexandru Tudor (Bucharest)

15 October 2015	Viitorul Constanța	0–3	Astra Giurgiu	Orășenesc, Ovidiu
18:15			Teixeira 37'; Alibec 66'; Ioniță 90+4'	Referee: Rusandru Lucian (Sfantu Gheorghe)

15 October 2015	Steaua București	1–0	ACS Poli Timișoara	Arena Națională, Bucharest
21:00	Chipciu 32'			Referee: Andrei Florin Chivulete (Bucharest)

== Semi-finals ==
In the semifinals qualified 4 teams, namely the winners of the quarterfinals. Quarterfinals winners are:

1) CS Concordia Chiajna

2) FC Dinamo București

3) FC Astra Giurgiu

4) FC Steaua București

These teams will be divided in two matches. Matches will be played roundtrip. The winners of those matches will qualify for the League Cup final.

=== 1st leg ===
9 March 2016	Steaua București	1–0	Astra Giurgiu	Nicolae Dobrin, Pitești
17:00	Tadé 63'			Referee: Marius Avram (Bucharest)

10 March 2016	Concordia Chiajna	3–0	Dinamo București	Stadionul Concordia, Chiajna
18:00	Milevskyi 5'; Obodo 52'; Pena 87'			Referee: Adrian Cojocaru (Galati)

=== 2nd leg ===
13 April 2016	Astra Giurgiu	0–2 (0–3 agg.)	Steaua București	Marin Anastasovici, Giurgiu
17:30			Bawab 5', 51'	Referee: Ovidiu Hațegan (Arad)

14 April 2016	Dinamo București	1–1 (1–4 agg.)	Concordia Chiajna	Dinamo, Bucharest
18:00	Gnohéré 14'		Bucurică 77'	Referee: George Găman (Craiova)

== Final ==
17 July 2016 Final	Steaua București	2–1 (a.e.t.)	Concordia Chiajna	Bucharest
20:00 EET (UTC+02)	Momčilović 61'; Hamroun 111' (pen.)	Report	Pena 88'	Stadium: Arena Națională; Referee: Marius Avram
