= 2015–16 Liga I =

98th season of Liga I

Liga I
- Season: 2015–16
- Champions: Astra Giurgiu (1st title)
- Relegated: Petrolul Ploiești
- Champions League: Astra Giurgiu; Steaua București
- Europa League: Pandurii Târgu Jiu; Viitorul Constanța; CSMS Iași
- Matches: 268
- Goals: 659 (2.46 per match)
- Top goalscorer: Ioan Hora (19 goals)
- Best goalkeeper: Branko Grahovac; Alexandru Marc (14 clean sheets)
- Biggest home win: CFR Cluj 6–0 Botoșani (16 April 2016)
- Biggest away win: Astra Giurgiu 1–5 Târgu Mureș (19 July 2015); Dinamo București 1–5 Viitorul Constanța (2 November 2015); Petrolul Ploiești 0–4 Botoșani (22 April 2016)
- Highest scoring: Steaua București 5–3 Botoșani (8 November 2015)
- Longest winning run: 5 matches: Astra Giurgiu
- Longest unbeaten run: 13 matches: Dinamo București
- Longest winless run: 14 matches: Voluntari
- Longest losing run: 9 matches: Petrolul Ploiești
- Highest attendance: 48,613; Steaua București 1–1 Dinamo București (10 April 2016)
- Lowest attendance: 100; Pandurii Târgu Jiu 0–3 Botoșani (5 December 2015)
- Total attendance: 1,190,724
- Average attendance: 4,443
- All statistics correct as of 29 May 2016.

The 2015–16 Liga I (also known as Liga 1 Orange for sponsorship reasons) was the 98th season of the Liga I, the top professional league for Romanian association football clubs. The season began 10 July 2015 and ended on 29 May 2016, being the first to take place since the play-off/play-out format has been introduced.

FC Steaua București were the defending champions for a third consecutive time, but they did not retain the title. Astra Giurgiu became winners for the first time in their history.

== Teams ==
The last six teams from the 2014–15 season were relegated to their respective 2015–16 Liga II division. Gaz Metan Mediaș, Brașov, Universitatea Cluj, Rapid București, Oțelul Galați and Ceahlăul Piatra Neamț.

The first team from each of the two divisions of 2014–15 Liga II advanced to Liga I. Voluntari promoted as the winners of Seria I. It is their first season in Liga I. ACS Poli Timișoara promoted as the winners of Seria II. It is their second season in Liga I.

=== Venues ===
Steaua București (Note: Since 29 November 2015 to 18 March 2016, Steaua was relocated to Nicolae Dobrin Stadium from Pitești, as a result of Arena Națională not having an ISU licence.)	ACS Poli Timișoara	CFR Cluj	Pandurii Târgu Jiu
Arena Națională	Dan Păltinișanu	Dr. Constantin Rădulescu	Municipal (Note: Pandurii was relocated to Municipal Stadium from Drobeta-Turnu Severin for the next two seasons, as a result of the renovations of the Tudor Vladimirescu Stadium.)
Capacity: 55,634	Capacity: 32,972	Capacity: 23,500	Capacity: 20,054
Petrolul Ploiești	2015–16 Liga I (Romania) Location of Bucharest teams.		Dinamo București
Ilie Oană	2015–16 Liga I (Romania) Location of Bucharest teams.		Dinamo
Capacity: 15,073	2015–16 Liga I (Romania) Location of Bucharest teams.		Capacity: 15,032
FC Voluntari (Note: Voluntari was relocated to Dinamo Stadium for this season, as a result of the renovations of the Anghel Iordănescu Stadium.)	2015–16 Liga I (Romania) Location of Bucharest teams.		CSMS Iași
Dinamo	2015–16 Liga I (Romania) Location of Bucharest teams.		Emil Alexandrescu
Capacity: 15,032	2015–16 Liga I (Romania) Location of Bucharest teams.		Capacity: 11,390
Astra Giurgiu	2015–16 Liga I (Romania) Location of Bucharest teams.		Târgu Mureș (Note: Târgu Mureș on 22 November – 2 December 2015, ASA Târgu Mureș played two home matches at Cluj Arena from Cluj-Napoca, as a result of Trans-Sil Stadium not having an ISU licence.)
Marin Anastasovici	2015–16 Liga I (Romania) Location of Bucharest teams.		Trans-Sil
Capacity: 8,500	2015–16 Liga I (Romania) Location of Bucharest teams.		Capacity: 8,200
FC Botoșani	Universitatea Craiova (Note: Universitatea Craiova was relocated to Extensiv Stadium for this season, as a result of the demolition of the old Ion Oblemenco Stadium, that is planned to be replaced by a modern arena, new Ion Oblemenco Stadium.)	Concordia Chiajna	Viitorul Constanța (Note: Viitorul was relocated to Viitorul Stadium from Ovidiu, as a result of the opening of the stadium.)
Municipal	Extensiv	Concordia	Viitorul
Capacity: 7,782	Capacity: 7,000	Capacity: 5,123	Capacity: 4,554

=== Personnel and kits ===
Note: Flags indicate national team as has been defined under FIFA eligibility rules. Players and Managers may hold more than one non-FIFA nationality.

Team	Manager	Captain	Kit manufacturer	Shirt sponsor
Astra Giurgiu	(Romania) Marius Șumudică	(Romania) Valerică Găman	Puma	InterAgro
Botoșani	(Romania) Leontin Grozavu	(Cameroon) Michael Ngadeu	Nike	Elsaco
CFR Cluj	(Portugal) Toni Conceição	(Portugal) Mário Camora	Joma	EnergoBit
Concordia Chiajna	(Romania) Adrian Falub	(Nigeria) Christian Obodo	Lotto	—
CSMS Iași	(Italy) Nicolò Napoli	(Romania) Ionuț Voicu	Nike	Blue Air
Universitatea Craiova	(Romania) Victor Naicu	(Bulgaria) Valentin Iliev	Joma	—
Dinamo București	(Romania) Mircea Rednic	(Romania) Paul Anton	Nike	Orange
Pandurii Târgu Jiu	(Romania) Eduard Iordănescu	(Romania) Dan Nistor	Jako	Complexul Energetic Oltenia
Petrolul Ploiești	(Romania) Ionel Gane	(Romania) Alberto Cobrea	Nike	SuperBet
Poli Timișoara	(Romania) Ionuț Popa	(Romania) Cristian Scutaru	Joma	Casa Rusu
Steaua București	(Romania) Laurențiu Reghecampf	(Cape Verde) Fernando Varela	Nike	City Insurance
Târgu Mureș	(Romania) George Ciorceri	(Romania) Gabriel Mureșan	Joma	energo+
Viitorul Constanța	(Romania) Gheorghe Hagi	(Romania) Florin Cernat	Nike	Lotto Snacks
Voluntari	(Romania) Dinu Todoran	(Romania) Vasile Maftei	Puma	Primăria Orașului Voluntari

=== Managerial changes ===
Team	Outgoing manager	Manner of departure	Date of vacancy	Position in table	Incoming manager	Date of appointment
Voluntari	(Romania) Ilie Poenaru	No PRO licence	31 May 2015	Pre-season	(Romania) Bogdan Vintilă	21 June 2015
Petrolul Ploiești	(Romania) Valentin Sinescu (caretaker)	End of tenure as a caretaker	2 June 2015	Pre-season	(Romania) Tibor Selymes	3 June 2015
Târgu Mureș	(Romania) Liviu Ciobotariu	Mutual agreement	4 June 2015	Pre-season	(Romania) Dan Petrescu	11 June 2015
Steaua București	(Romania) Constantin Gâlcă	End of contract	9 June 2015	Pre-season	(Italy) Massimo Pedrazzini	9 June 2015
Târgu Mureș	(Romania) Dan Petrescu	Signed by Jiangsu Sainty	10 July 2015	Pre-season	(Romania) Vasile Miriuță	10 July 2015
Voluntari	(Romania) Bogdan Vintilă	Sacked	14 August 2015	13	(Romania) Flavius Stoican	15 August 2015
Poli Timișoara	(Romania) Dan Alexa	Resigned	21 August 2015	12	(Romania) Florin Marin	25 August 2015
Petrolul Ploiești	(Romania) Tibor Selymes	Mutual agreement	25 August 2015	14	(Romania) Eusebiu Tudor	25 August 2015
Concordia Chiajna	(Romania) Marius Baciu	Mutual agreement	1 September 2015	10	(Romania) Cornel Țălnar	1 September 2015
Steaua București	(Italy) Massimo Pedrazzini	Mutual agreement	11 September 2015	5	(Romania) Dumitru Dumitriu	11 September 2015
Botoșani	(Romania) Leontin Grozavu	Sacked	14 September 2015	12	(Romania) Mugur Cornățeanu (caretaker)	14 September 2015
Târgu Mureș	(Romania) Vasile Miriuță	Mutual agreement	20 September 2015	3	(Italy) Cristiano Bergodi	22 September 2015
Voluntari	(Romania) Flavius Stoican	Mutual agreement	24 September 2015	13	(Romania) Mircea Rădulescu	24 September 2015
Botoșani	(Romania) Mugur Cornățeanu (caretaker)	End of tenure as a caretaker	1 October 2015	12	(Romania) Cristian Pustai	1 October 2015
Voluntari	(Romania) Mircea Rădulescu	Mutual agreement	6 October 2015	13	(Romania) Gheorghe Mulțescu	6 October 2015
Petrolul Ploiești	(Romania) Eusebiu Tudor	Mutual agreement	29 October 2015	14	(Romania) Mihai Stoichiță	29 October 2015
Concordia Chiajna	(Romania) Cornel Țălnar	Mutual agreement	25 November 2015	12	(Romania) Adrian Falub	25 November 2015
Steaua București	(Romania) Dumitru Dumitriu	Mutual agreement	2 December 2015	5	(Romania) Laurențiu Reghecampf	3 December 2015
CFR Cluj	(Romania) Francisc Dican	Mutual agreement	5 December 2015	9	(Portugal) Toni Conceição	7 December 2015
Târgu Mureș	(Italy) Cristiano Bergodi	Resigned	17 December 2015	6	(Romania) Petre Grigoraș	29 December 2015
Petrolul Ploiești	(Romania) Mihai Stoichiță	Mutual agreement	5 January 2016	14	(Romania) Constantin Schumacher	5 January 2016
Universitatea Craiova	(Romania) Emil Săndoi	Mutual agreement	8 January 2016	8	(Romania) Victor Naicu	8 January 2016
Voluntari	(Romania) Gheorghe Mulțescu	Resigned	22 January 2016	13	(Romania) Ionel Ganea	24 January 2016
Târgu Mureș	(Romania) Petre Grigoraș	Mutual agreement	22 February 2016	7	(Romania) Carol Fekete (caretaker)	22 February 2016
Târgu Mureș	(Romania) Carol Fekete (caretaker)	End of tenure as a caretaker	9 March 2016	6	(Romania) George Ciorceri	9 March 2016
Petrolul Ploiești	(Romania) Constantin Schumacher	Mutual agreement	14 March 2016	8 Relegation round	(Romania) Ionel Gane	15 March 2016
Poli Timișoara	(Romania) Florin Marin	Mutual agreement	23 March 2016	7 Relegation round	(Romania) Petre Grigoraș	28 March 2016
Botoșani	(Romania) Cristian Pustai	Mutual agreement	1 April 2016	5 Relegation round	(Romania) Leontin Grozavu	5 April 2016
Voluntari	(Romania) Ionel Ganea	Sacked	25 April 2016	6 Relegation round	(Romania) Sorin Popescu	27 April 2016
Poli Timișoara	(Romania) Petre Grigoraș	Sacked	23 May 2016	7 Relegation round	(Romania) Ionuț Popa	23 May 2016
Voluntari	(Romania) Sorin Popescu	Mutual agreement	24 May 2016	6 Relegation round	(Romania) Dinu Todoran	24 May 2016

== Regular season ==
In the regular season the 14 teams will meet twice, a total of 26 matches per team, with the top 6 advancing to the Championship round and the bottom 8 qualifying for Relegation round.

=== Table ===
Pos	Team	Pld	W	D	L	GF	GA	GD	Pts	Qualification
1	Astra Giurgiu	26	14	9	3	42	29	+13	51	Qualification for the championship round
2	Dinamo București	26	13	9	4	36	24	+12	48	Qualification for the championship round
3	Pandurii Târgu Jiu	26	13	8	5	35	26	+9	47	Qualification for the championship round
4	Viitorul Constanța	26	13	7	6	49	30	+19	46	Qualification for the championship round
5	Steaua București	26	12	8	6	35	25	+10	44	Qualification for the championship round
6	Târgu Mureș	26	9	11	6	27	21	+6	38	Qualification for the championship round
7	CSMS Iași	26	9	10	7	22	25	−3	37	Qualification for the relegation round
8	Universitatea Craiova	26	8	7	11	26	27	−1	31	Qualification for the relegation round
9	CFR Cluj (Note: CFR Cluj were deducted ten points for failing to comply with licensing requirements.)	26	9	10	7	31	25	+6	27	Qualification for the relegation round
10	Botoșani	26	6	8	12	30	35	−5	26	Qualification for the relegation round
11	ACS Poli Timișoara	26	5	10	11	24	35	−11	25	Qualification for the relegation round
12	Voluntari	26	5	9	12	28	42	−14	24	Qualification for the relegation round
13	Concordia Chiajna	26	3	8	15	22	46	−24	17	Qualification for the relegation round
14	Petrolul Ploiești (Note: Petrolul Ploiești were deducted six points for failing to comply with licensing requirements.)	26	2	8	16	17	34	−17	8	Qualification for the relegation round

Source: Liga 1, Soccerway
Rules for classification: 1) Points; 2) Head-to-head points; 3) Head-to-head goal difference; 4) Head-to-head goals scored; 5) Goal difference; 6) Goals scored; 7) Play-off.

=== Results ===
Home \ Away	ACS	AST	BOT	CFR	CON	IAȘ	CSU	DIN	PAN	PET	STE	TGM	VII	VOL
ACS Poli Timișoara		1–3	1–0	1–2	1–0	2–2	1–1	0–1	0–1	1–0	1–0	2–0	1–2	1–2
Astra Giurgiu	2–2		1–0	2–2	2–2	4–1	1–0	1–1	1–2	3–1	2–0	1–5	2–2	1–1
Botoșani	1–1	0–1		2–1	5–1	1–0	3–2	1–1	0–2	2–1	0–1	1–1	2–2	2–2
CFR Cluj	1–0	1–1	3–1		0–0	0–0	1–2	1–1	1–2	1–0	2–0	1–0	1–2	2–0
Concordia Chiajna	2–2	0–2	0–0	2–1		0–1	0–2	1–3	3–0	2–2	0–2	1–2	2–2	1–2
CSMS Iași	1–1	1–1	1–0	2–1	0–1		1–0	0–0	1–0	1–0	1–2	0–1	0–0	2–1
CS U Craiova	1–1	1–2	0–0	0–1	2–0	2–0		3–0	0–0	2–0	1–2	1–1	1–2	1–2
Dinamo București	2–1	0–1	1–0	0–2	4–0	0–0	1–0		2–1	2–0	3–1	2–1	1–5	3–0
Pandurii Târgu Jiu	3–1	1–1	0–3	1–1	2–0	3–0	1–1	2–2		3–2	0–3	2–0	1–0	2–1
Petrolul Ploiești	1–1	0–1	2–1	1–0	1–1	1–2	0–1	1–2	1–1		0–0	0–1	1–2	1–1
Steaua București	3–1	0–1	5–3	1–1	3–1	1–1	2–0	0–0	1–1	0–0		1–1	1–0	3–1
Târgu Mureș	0–0	3–1	1–0	0–0	1–0	1–1	0–0	0–0	0–1	1–1	1–1		2–2	2–1
Viitorul Constanța	4–0	1–2	3–1	2–2	3–1	1–2	4–0	1–1	1–3	1–0	0–1	1–0		3–0
Voluntari	0–0	1–2	1–1	2–2	1–1	1–1	1–2	1–3	0–0	1–0	3–1	0–2	2–3	

Source: Liga 1
Legend: Blue = home team win; Yellow = draw; Red = away team win.

=== Positions by round ===
Team ╲ Round	1	2	3	4	5	6	7	8	9	10	11	12	13	14	15	16	17	18	19	20	21	22	23	24	25	26
ACS Poli Timișoara	12	12	9	9	11	12	12	12	11	9	9	9	9	10	10	10	10	10	10	10	10	11	11	11	11	11
FC Astra Giurgiu	2	11	6	6	6	2	1	1	1	1	1	1	1	1	1	1	1	1	1	1	1	1	1	1	1	1
FC Botoșani	7	7	10	12	10	8	10	11	12	12	12	12	12	11	12	11	12	11	11	11	11	10	9	9	10	10
CFR Cluj	13	13	13	10	12	9	8	9	8	7	8	8	8	9	8	8	9	9	9	9	9	9	10	10	9	9
CS Concordia Chiajna	2	9	11	11	13	10	11	8	10	11	11	11	11	12	11	12	11	12	12	12	12	12	12	13	13	13
CSMS Iași	5	3	2	5	1	4	4	7	7	10	10	10	10	8	9	9	8	8	8	8	7	7	7	7	6	7
CS U Craiova	7	10	12	13	8	11	9	10	9	8	7	7	7	7	6	7	7	7	7	7	8	8	8	8	8	8
FC Dinamo București	7	4	4	3	3	1	2	3	2	4	5	4	5	5	5	6	5	5	4	4	4	3	3	2	2	2
CS Pandurii Târgu Jiu	1	5	5	4	5	7	7	6	6	6	4	5	4	4	4	3	4	3	3	2	3	4	5	5	4	3
FC Petrolul Ploiești	14	14	14	14	14	14	14	14	14	14	14	14	14	14	14	14	14	14	14	14	14	14	14	14	14	14
FC Steaua București	7	2	3	2	2	6	6	5	5	5	3	3	2	3	3	4	3	4	5	5	5	5	4	4	5	5
ASA Târgu Mureș	7	1	1	1	4	5	5	4	4	3	6	6	6	6	7	5	6	6	6	6	6	6	6	6	7	6
FC Viitorul Constanța	2	6	7	7	7	3	3	2	3	2	2	2	3	2	2	2	2	2	2	3	2	2	2	3	3	4
FC Voluntari	5	7	8	8	9	13	13	13	13	13	13	13	13	13	13	13	13	13	13	13	13	13	13	12	12	12

== Championship play-offs ==
The top six teams from Regular season met twice (10 matches per team) for places in 2016–17 UEFA Champions League and 2016–17 UEFA Europa League as well as deciding the league champion. Teams started the Championship round with their points from the Regular season halved, rounded upwards, and no other records carried over from the Regular season.

=== Table ===
Pos	Team	Pld	W	D	L	GF	GA	GD	Pts	Qualification
1	Astra Giurgiu (C)	10	7	1	2	20	9	+11	48	Qualification for the Champions League third qualifying round
2	Steaua București	10	6	3	1	18	8	+10	43	Qualification for the Champions League third qualifying round
3	Pandurii Târgu Jiu	10	3	6	1	12	7	+5	39	Qualification for the Europa League third qualifying round
4	Dinamo București (Note: Dinamo București failed to obtain a UEFA licence after filing for insolvency in 2014.)	10	2	6	2	12	15	−3	36	
5	Viitorul Constanța	10	1	3	6	14	21	−7	29	Qualification for the Europa League third qualifying round
6	Târgu Mureș (Note: On 31 March 2016, the Adjudicatory Chamber of the UEFA Club Financial Control Body (CFCB) announced that Târgu Mureș will be excluded from participating in the next UEFA club competition for which they would otherwise qualify in the next three seasons (i.e. the 2016/17, 2017/18 and 2018/19 seasons).)	10	0	3	7	8	24	−16	22	

Source: Soccerway
Rules for classification: 1) Points.
(C) Champions

=== Results ===
Home \ Away	AST	DIN	PAN	STE	TGM	VII
Astra Giurgiu		4–2	0–0	2–0	1–0	2–0
Dinamo București	1–4		1–1	1–1	1–0	3–3
Pandurii Târgu Jiu	2–0	0–0		0–1	3–3	1–1
Steaua București	2–0	1–1	1–1		2–1	3–0
Târgu Mureș	1–4	0–0	0–2	1–4		1–1
Viitorul Constanța	1–3	1–2	0–2	1–3	6–1	

Source: Liga 1
Legend: Blue = home team win; Yellow = draw; Red = away team win.

=== Positions by round ===
Team ╲ Round	1	2	3	4	5	6	7	8	9	10
Astra	1	1	1	1	1	1	1	1	1	1
Dinamo	3	4	4	4	4	4	4	4	4	4
Pandurii	2	2	3	3	3	3	3	3	3	3
Steaua	4	3	2	2	2	2	2	2	2	2
Târgu Mureș	6	6	6	6	6	6	6	6	6	6
Viitorul	5	5	5	5	5	5	5	5	5	5

== Relegation play-outs ==
The bottom eight teams from regular season will meet twice (14 matches per team) to contest against relegation. Teams start the Relegation round with their points from the Regular season halved, rounded upwards, and no other records carried over from the Regular season. The winner of the Relegation round finishes 7th in the overall season standings, the second placed team – 8th, and so on, with the last placed team in the Relegation round being 14th.

=== Table ===
Pos	Team	Pld	W	D	L	GF	GA	GD	Pts	Qualification or relegation
7	CSMS Iași	14	5	5	4	17	15	+2	39	Qualification for the Europa League second qualifying round
8	Universitatea Craiova	14	7	2	5	19	17	+2	39	
9	Botoșani	14	7	4	3	29	19	+10	38	
10	CFR Cluj (Note: CFR Cluj would have qualified for the Europa League third qualifying round by winning the 2015–16 Cupa României, but failed to obtain a UEFA licence after filing for insolvency in 2015.)	14	6	4	4	25	13	+12	36	
11	Concordia Chiajna	14	7	5	2	19	13	+6	35	
12	Voluntari (O)	14	5	2	7	19	20	−1	29	Qualification for the relegation play-offs
13	ACS Poli Timișoara (Note: ACS Poli Timișoara were not relegated because the winners of 2015–16 Liga II, Rapid București, were excluded from Liga I after the club went to dissolution.)	14	1	4	9	14	36	−22	20	
14	Petrolul Ploiești (D, R)	14	4	2	8	9	18	−9	18	Not admitted to Liga II and revival in lower leagues

Source: Soccerway
Rules for classification: 1) Points.
(D) Disqualified; (O) Play-off winners; (R) Relegated

=== Results ===
Home \ Away	ACS	BOT	CFR	CON	IAȘ	CSU	PET	VOL
ACS Poli Timișoara		1–4	2–2	1–3	2–3	2–2	0–1	2–1
Botoșani	6–1		4–0	0–3	0–0	2–1	1–0	4–2
CFR Cluj	5–1	6–0		2–0	0–0	4–0	0–0	2–1
Concordia Chiajna	0–0	1–1	2–1		1–1	1–0	1–1	1–1
CSMS Iași	0–0	1–1	0–2	2–3		3–0	1–0	0–1
CS U Craiova	1–0	2–1	1–1	2–0	3–2		2–0	3–0
Petrolul Ploiești	3–2	0–4	1–0	0–1	1–2	1–0		1–2
Voluntari	5–0	1–1	1–0	1–2	1–2	0–2	2–0	

Source: Liga 1
Legend: Blue = home team win; Yellow = draw; Red = away team win.

=== Positions by round ===
Team ╲ Round	1	2	3	4	5	6	7	8	9	10	11	12	13	14
ACS Poli	11	11	13	13	13	13	13	13	13	13	13	13	13	13
Botoșani	10	10	10	11	11	11	11	11	10	10	10	9	10	9
CFR	9	9	9	10	10	9	8	9	9	9	8	10	7	10
Concordia	13	13	12	12	12	12	12	10	11	11	11	11	11	11
CSMS Iași	8	7	8	8	7	7	7	8	8	7	7	8	8	7
CS U Craiova	7	8	7	7	8	8	9	7	7	8	9	7	9	8
Petrolul	14	14	14	14	14	14	14	14	14	14	14	14	14	14
Voluntari	12	12	11	9	9	10	10	12	12	12	12	12	12	12

== Promotion/relegation play-offs ==
The 12th-placed team of the Liga I faces the winner of the match between second place from Liga II, Seria I and second place from Seria II.

=== First round ===
Team 1	Agg.	Team 2	1st leg	2nd leg
Dunărea Călărași	4–5	UTA Arad	3–1	1–4 (a.e.t.)

1 June 2016	Dunărea Călărași	3–1	UTA Arad	Călărași
18:00	Alexandru 4', 45'; Kanda 80'		Strătilă 43'	Stadium: Ion Comșa; Attendance: 6,500; Referee: Marius Avram (Bucharest)

4 June 2016	UTA Arad	4–1 (a.e.t.)	Dunărea Călărași	Arad
18:00	Man 17'; Curtuiuș 34'; Rus 77', 99'		Stoica 81'	Stadium: Motorul; Attendance: 2,000; Referee: Sebastian Colțescu (Craiova)

=== Second round ===
Team 1	Agg.	Team 2	1st leg	2nd leg
Voluntari	3–1	UTA Arad	3–0	0–1

8 June 2016	Voluntari	3–0	UTA Arad	Voluntari
18:30	Voduț 27'; Tudorie 44'; Bălan 79'			Stadium: Anghel Iordănescu; Attendance: 3,000; Referee: István Kovács (Carei)

12 June 2016	UTA Arad	1–0	Voluntari	Arad
13:00	Rus 88'			Stadium: Motorul; Attendance: 2,000; Referee: Cristian Balaj (Baia Mare)

Notes:

- Voluntari qualified for 2016–17 Liga I and UTA Arad qualified for 2016–17 Liga II.

== Season statistics ==
=== Top scorers ===
Updated to matches played on 29 May 2016

Rank	Player	Club	Goals
1	(Romania) Ioan Hora	Pandurii Târgu Jiu	19
2	(Romania) Denis Alibec	Astra Giurgiu	16
3	(Romania) Florin Tănase	Viitorul Constanța	15
4	(Romania) Nicolae Stanciu	Steaua București	12
4	(Spain) Cristian López	CFR Cluj	12
4	(France) Harlem Gnohéré	Dinamo București	12
4	(Bosnia and Herzegovina) Bojan Golubović	CSMS Iași	12
8	(Romania) Adrian Bălan	Voluntari	11
8	(Argentina) Gonzalo Cabrera	Botoșani	11
10	(Cape Verde) Nuno Rocha	Universitatea Craiova	9

=== Hat-tricks ===
Player	For	Against	Result	Date
(Spain) Cristian López	CFR Cluj	FC Botoșani	3–1	31 August 2015
(Romania) Denis Alibec	Astra Giurgiu	Dinamo București	4–1	1 April 2016

=== Clean sheets ===
Updated to matches played on 29 May 2016

Rank	Player	Club	Clean sheets^{*}
1	(Bosnia and Herzegovina) Branko Grahovac	CSMS Iași	14
1	(Romania) Alexandru Marc	CFR Cluj	14
3	(Lithuania) Vytautas Černiauskas	Dinamo București	13
4	(Romania) Cristian Bălgrădean	Universitatea Craiova / Concordia Chiajna	12
5	(Romania) Eduard Stăncioiu	Târgu Mureș	10
6	(Romania) Silviu Lung	Astra Giurgiu	9
7	(Romania) Florin Niță	Steaua București	8
8	(Portugal) Pedro Mingote	Pandurii Târgu Jiu	7
9	(Romania) Victor Rîmniceanu	Viitorul Constanța	6
9	(Romania) Răzvan Stanca	Pandurii Târgu Jiu	6
11	(Germany) Sascha Kirschstein	ACS Poli Timișoara	5
12	(Romania) Valentin Cojocaru	Steaua București	4
12	(Romania) Florin Matache	Concordia Chiajna	4
12	(Romania) Alberto Cobrea	Petrolul Ploiești	4
12	(Romania) Răzvan Pleșca	Botoșani	4

^{*} Only goalkeepers who played all 90 minutes of a match are taken into consideration.

=== Discipline ===
As of 29 May 2016

==== Player ====
- Most yellow cards: 13
  - (Romania) Adrian Ropotan (Pandurii Târgu Jiu)
  - (Romania) Gabriel Mureșan (Târgu Mureș)
- Most red cards: 3
  - (Romania) Steliano Filip (Dinamo București)

==== Club ====
- Most yellow cards: 119
  - Petrolul Ploiești
- Most red cards: 14
  - Târgu Mureș

== Champion squad ==
Astra Giurgiu

Goalkeepers: Ionuț Boșneag (1 / 0); George Gavrilaș (9 / 0); Silviu Lung Jr. (27 / 0).
Defenders: Alexandru Dandea (19 / 2); Valerică Găman (28 / 6); Geraldo Alves (Portugal) (23 / 0); Júnior Morais (Brazil) (29 / 1); Cristian Oroș (19 / 1); Pedro Queirós (Portugal) (32 / 0); Ricardo Alves (Portugal) (4 / 0); Adrian Scarlatache (1 / 0).
Midfielders: Fernando Boldrin (Brazil) (32 / 5); Boubacar Mansaly (Senegal) (13 / 0); Damien Boudjemaa (France) (11 / 1); Constantin Budescu (18 / 8); Gabriel Enache (22 / 1); Filipe Teixeira (Portugal) (26 / 4); Alexandru Ioniță (19 / 3); Florin Lovin (25 / 0); Romario Moise (1 / 0); Iulian Roșu (4 / 1); Takayuki Seto (Japan) (15 / 0); Alexandru Stan (12 / 1); Fwayo Tembo (Zambia) (3 / 0); William De Amorim (Brazil) (30 / 5).
Forwards: Denis Alibec (26 / 16); Daniel Florea (29 / 3); Ninos Gouriye (Netherlands) (4 / 0); Daniel Niculae (19 / 2); Mădălin Răileanu (1 / 0).
(league appearances and goals listed in brackets)

Manager: Marius Șumudică.

== Monthly awards ==
Month	DigiSport Player of the Month		Reference
Month	Player	Club	Reference
July	Constantin Budescu	Astra Giurgiu	
August	Constantin Budescu	Astra Giurgiu	
September	Harlem Gnohéré	Dinamo București	
October	Ioan Hora	Pandurii Târgu Jiu	
November	Nicolae Stanciu	Steaua București	
December	Denis Alibec	Astra Giurgiu	
February	Marcel Essombé	Dinamo București	
March	Nicolae Stanciu	Steaua București	
April	Denis Alibec	Astra Giurgiu	
May	Gonzalo Cabrera	FC Botoșani	

== Attendances ==
#	Club	Average	Highest
1	Steaua	9,158	48,632
2	Dinamo 1948	5,434	20,360
3	Iași	4,100	10,000
4	Timișoara	3,463	20,000
5	Petrolul	3,450	8,000
6	Astra	3,259	8,500
7	Botoșani	3,064	7,782
8	Târgu Mureș	3,056	5,000
9	CFR Cluj	2,975	8,000
10	Viitorul	2,544	4,500
11	U Craiova	2,434	6,071
12	Pandurii	1,953	12,800
13	Voluntari	1,323	5,219
14	Concordia	1,155	4,000
