= 2011–12 FC Steaua București season =

Steaua București
2011–12 season
- Owner: George Becali
- President: Valeriu Argăseală
- Head coach: Ronny Levy; Ilie Stan; Mihai Stoichiță
- Stadium: Arena Națională; Stadionul Steaua
- Liga I: 3rd
- Cupa României: Round of 16
- Supercupa României: Runners-up
- Europa League: Round of 32
- Top goalscorer: League: Raul Rusescu (13); All: Raul Rusescu (15)
- Highest home attendance: 50,051 vs AEK Larnaca (14 December 2011)
- Average home league attendance: 16,192
Home colours	Away colours

The 2011–12 season was the 64th season in the existence of FC Steaua București and the club's 64th consecutive season in the top flight of Romanian football. In addition to the domestic league, Steaua București participated in this season's edition of the Cupa României, the Supercupa României and the UEFA Europa League.

== Previous season positions ==
	Competition	Position
(European Union)	UEFA Europa League	3rd / Group stage
(Romania)	Liga I	5th
(Romania)	Cupa României	Winners

== Players ==
=== Squad information ===
N	Pos.	Nat.	Name	Age	EU	Since	App	Goals	Ends	Transfer fee	Notes
1	GK	(Romania)	Stanca	32	EU	2011	1	0	Undisclosed	Undisclosed	
2	RB	(Romania)	G. Matei	22	EU	2011	0	0	Undisclosed	€0.7M	
4	CB	(Bulgaria)	Iliev	31	EU	2011	4	0	2012	Free	
6	CB	(Romania)	Gardoș	22	EU	2010	23	0	Undisclosed	Undisclosed	Also plays as DM
7	AM	(Romania)	Chipciu	23	EU	2012	0	0	2017	Undisclosed	
8	AM	(Romania)	Răduț	22	EU	2010	20	0	Undisclosed	Undisclosed	
9	FW	(Romania)	M. Costea	24	EU	2011	0	0	Undisclosed	€1.4M	40% of next sale will go to Universitatea Craiova
10	AM	(Romania)	Tănase	25	EU	2009	48	2	2014	€1.8M	Also plays as LW, RW and CM; 50% of next sale will go to Argeș Pitești
11	CM	(Romania)	Prepeliță	26	EU	2011	0	0	2015	Free	
12	GK	(Romania)	Tătărușanu	26	EU	2008	49	0	2013	€1.5M	
14	LB	(Romania)	Latovlevici	26	EU	2010	27	0	2015	Undisclosed	
18	CB	(Serbia)	Martinović	27	Non-EU	2010	9	1	2013	Undisclosed	Also plays as RB
19	LB	(Romania)	Lupu	21	EU	2011	0	0	Undisclosed	Youth system	
20	RB	(Romania)	Dănănae	26	EU	2012	0	0	2016	Free	
21	CB	(Romania)	Chiricheș	22	EU	2012	0	0	Undisclosed	Undisclosed	
22	LW	(Romania)	Pârvulescu	23	EU	2012	0	0	2017	Undisclosed	
23	CB	(Portugal)	Geraldo	31	EU	2010	27	2	2012	Free	
24	FW	(Romania)	Rusescu	23	EU	2011	0	0	Undisclosed	Undisclosed	
26	CM	(Romania)	Bicfalvi	24	EU	2007	41	1	2012	Undisclosed	
27	RW	(Romania)	Năstăsie	20	EU	2011	0	0	Undisclosed	Youth system	
28	RW	(Romania)	Roșu	18	EU	2011	0	0	Undisclosed	Youth system	
29	FW	(Romania)	F. Costea	27	EU	2011	0	0	2015	Free	
30	RW	(Romania)	T. Bălan	31	EU	2011	0	0	Undisclosed	Free	
31	FW	(Brazil)	Machado	22	Non-EU	2012	0	0	Undisclosed	€0.2M + D. Popa	
55	DM	(Romania)	Bourceanu	27	EU	2011	0	0	2014	€0.7M	
77	FW	(Brazil)	L. Tatu	30	Non-EU	2011	0	0	Undisclosed	Free	
90	FW	(Montenegro)	Nikolić	22	Non-EU	2011	0	0	2012	€0.2M	
95	GK	(Romania)	Cojocaru	16	EU	2011	0	0	Undisclosed	Youth system	
Players from YS
15	RB	(Romania)	Mustață	21	EU	2011	0	0	Undisclosed	Undisclosed	
Players sold or loaned out during the season
16	RW	(Romania)	Nicoliță	27	EU	2005	183	23	Undisclosed	Undisclosed	Also plays as LW and RB
30	CM	(Romania)	Băjenaru	29	EU	2011	0	0	Undisclosed	Marinescu	
22	CB	(Romania)	Galamaz	31	EU	2010	11	0	Undisclosed	Undisclosed	
3	LB	(Nigeria)	Emeghara	28	Non-EU	2011	34	0	Undisclosed	Free	
47	DM	(Romania)	D. Popa	23	EU	2011	0	0	Undisclosed	€0.1M	
5	DM	(Argentina)	Brandán	29	Non-EU	2010	26	0	Undisclosed	Undisclosed	Also plays as LB

- Last updated: 13:02, 21 December 2011 (UTC)
- Source: Steaua News

=== Transfers ===
==== In ====
No.	Pos.	Nat.	Name	Age	EU	Moving from	Type	Transfer window	Ends	Transfer fee	Source
19	LB	(Romania)	Lupu	20	EU	Steaua II București	Promoted	Summer	Undisclosed	Youth system	
27	RW	(Romania)	Năstăsie	19	EU	Steaua II București	Promoted	Summer	Undisclosed	Youth system	
28	RW	(Romania)	Roșu	17	EU	Steaua II București	Promoted	Summer	Undisclosed	Youth system	
95	GK	(Romania)	Cojocaru	15	EU	Steaua II București	Promoted	Summer	Undisclosed	Youth system	
77	FW	(Brazil)	L. Tatu	29	Non-EU	Beira-Mar (Portugal)	Free transfer	Summer	Undisclosed	Free	FCSB
2	RB	(Romania)	G. Matei	21	EU	Pandurii Târgu Jiu	Loan return	Summer	Undisclosed	—	
—	DM	(Romania)	Onicaș	21	EU	Unirea Urziceni	Loan return	Summer	Undisclosed	—	
24	FW	(Romania)	Rusescu	22	EU	Unirea Urziceni	Transfer	Summer	Undisclosed	Undisclosed	
47	DM	(Romania)	D. Popa	22	EU	Victoria Brănești	Transfer	Summer	Undisclosed	€0.1M	
9	FW	(Romania)	M. Costea	23	EU	Universitatea Craiova	Transfer	Summer	Undisclosed	€1.4M	
30	CM	(Romania)	Băjenaru	28	EU	Universitatea Cluj	Swap	Summer	Undisclosed	Marinescu	
55	DM	(Romania)	Bourceanu	26	EU	Politehnica Timișoara	Transfer	Summer	2014	€0.7M	FCPT
90	FW	(Montenegro)	Nikolić	21	Non-EU	Politehnica Timișoara	Loan	Summer	2012	€0.2M	FCPT
11	CM	(Romania)	Prepeliță	25	EU	Universitatea Craiova	Free transfer	Summer	2015	Free	FCSB
7	FW	(Romania)	F. Costea	26	EU	Universitatea Craiova	Free transfer	Summer	2015	Free	FCSB
3	LB	(Nigeria)	Emeghara	27	Non-EU	Steaua București	Free transfer	Summer	Undisclosed	Free	
30	RW	(Romania)	T. Bălan	30	EU	Sportul Studențesc București	Free transfer	Summer	Undisclosed	Free	
7	AM	(Romania)	Chipciu	22	EU	Brașov	Transfer	Winter	2017	Undisclosed	FCSB
21	CB	(Romania)	Chiricheș	22	EU	Pandurii Târgu Jiu	Transfer	Winter	Undisclosed	Undisclosed	CSPTJ
22	LW	(Romania)	Pârvulescu	23	EU	Gaz Metan Mediaș	Transfer	Winter	2017	Undisclosed	FCSB
20	RB	(Romania)	Dănănae	26	EU	Tom Tomsk (Russia)	Free transfer	Winter	2016	Free	FCSB
31	FW	(Brazil)	Machado	22	Non-EU	Universitatea Cluj	Swap	Winter	Undisclosed	€0.2M + D. Popa	

==== Out ====
No.	Pos.	Nat.	Name	Age	EU	Moving to	Type	Transfer window	Transfer fee	Source
91	AM	(Romania)	Matei	19	EU	Astra Ploiești	Transfer	Summer	Undisclosed	
33	GK	(Romania)	Cezar	23	EU	Astra Ploiești	Transfer	Summer	Undisclosed	
7	RW	(Romania)	Székely	28	EU	Volga Nizhny Novgorod (Russia)	Mutual termination	Summer	Free	
11	RW	(Romania)	Onofraș	30	EU	Khazar Lankaran (Azerbaijan)	Contract termination	Summer	Free	
27	AM	(Romania)	Marinescu	26	EU	Universitatea Cluj	Swap	Summer	Băjenaru	
99	FW	(Brazil)	Maicon	23	Non-EU	Volyn Lutsk (Ukraine)	End of loan	Summer	—	
3	LB	(Nigeria)	Emeghara	27	Non-EU	Steaua București	End of contract	Summer	Free	
9	FW	(Romania)	Burdujan	27	EU	Chornomorets Odesa (Ukraine)	End of contract	Summer	Free	
20	FW	(Romania)	Dică	31	EU	Dacia Mioveni	End of contract	Summer	Free	
24	FW	(Romania)	Surdu	27	EU	Rapid București	End of contract	Summer	Free	
25	CB	(Romania)	Baciu	31	EU	FCM Bacău	End of contract	Summer	Free	
—	DM	(Romania)	Onicaș	21	EU	Viitorul Constanța	Loan	Summer	Undisclosed	
17	FW	(Romania)	Bilașco	29	EU	Tianjin TEDA (China)	Transfer	Summer	Free	
30	CM	(Romania)	Băjenaru	28	EU	Astra Ploiești	Transfer	Summer	Undisclosed	
16	RW	(Romania)	Nicoliță	26	EU	Saint-Étienne (France)	Transfer	Summer	€0.7M	
22	CB	(Romania)	Galamaz	30	EU	Universitatea Cluj	Free transfer	Winter	Free	FCUC
3	LB	(Nigeria)	Emeghara	27	Non-EU	Gabala (Azerbaijan)	End of contract	Winter	Free	
47	DM	(Romania)	D. Popa	23	EU	Universitatea Cluj	Swap	Winter	Machado	
5	DM	(Argentina)	Brandán	28	Non-EU	Liaoning Whowin (China)	Transfer	Winter	Undisclosed	

== Statistics ==
=== Player stats ===
				Total				UEFA Europa League		Liga I		Cupa României		Supercupa României		
N	Pos.	Name	Nat.	GS	App	Gls	Min	App	Gls	App	Gls	App	Gls	App	Gls	Notes
1	GK	Stanca	(Romania)	12	13	-13	—	3	-8	8	-3	2	-2			
2	RB	G. Matei	(Romania)	2	4		—			4						
4	CB	Iliev	(Bulgaria)	29	30	4	—	6		22	4	2				
6	CB	Gardoș	(Romania)	9	12		—	3		8				1		GS: 8 CB, 1 DM
7	AM	Chipciu	(Romania)	14	14	2	—			14	2					GS: 14 RW
8	AM	Răduț	(Romania)	5	16		—			15		1				GS: 3 CM, 1 AM, 1 SS
9	FW	M. Costea^{^{1}}	(Romania)	22	32	7	—	9	1	22	6	1				GS: 20 FW, 2 RW
10	AM	Tănase	(Romania)	40	41	7	—	9	3	30	4	1		1		GS: 37 LW, 2 AM, 1 FW
11	CM	Prepeliță	(Romania)	16	19	1	—	7		11		1	1			GS: 10 RW, 6 CM
12	GK	Tătărușanu	(Romania)	35	36	-30	—	7	-6	28	-23			1	-1	
14	LB	Latovlevici	(Romania)	31	33	1	—	9		22	1	1		1		
18	CB	Martinović	(Serbia)	24	28	5	—	8		18	4	1	1	1		GS: 22 RB, 2 CB
19	LB	Lupu	(Romania)	2	3		—			2		1				GS: 1 LB, 1 RB
20	RB	Dănănae	(Romania)	2	2		—	1		1						
21	CB	Chiricheș	(Romania)	16	16		—	2		14						GS: 12 CB, 3 DM, 1 RB
22	LW	Pârvulescu	(Romania)	11	13	1	—			13	1					GS: 10 LB, 1 LW
23	CB	Geraldo	(Portugal)	32	36	1	—	8		27	1	1				GS: 28 CB, 4 RB
24	FW	Rusescu	(Romania)	26	43	15	—	9	2	31	13	2		1		GS: 22 FW, 4 RW
26	CM	Bicfalvi^{^{1}}	(Romania)	22	29		—	6		21		1		1		GS: 16 CM, 3 RB, 3 DM
27	RW	Năstăsie	(Romania)		6		—	1		4		1				
28	RW	Roșu	(Romania)		4		—	2		1		1				
29	FW	F. Costea	(Romania)	11	26	2	—	6	1	18	1	2				GS: 6 LW, 5 FW
30	RW	T. Bălan	(Romania)	10	17	2	—			16	2	1				GS: 6 AM, 4 RW
31	FW	Machado	(Brazil)	1	3		—			3						
55	DM	Bourceanu	(Romania)	41	42		—	9		31		2				GS: 32 CM, 9 DM
77	FW	L. Tatu	(Brazil)	34	38	5	—	9	2	28	3			1		GS: 23 FW, 4 RW, 4 AM, 3 SS
90	FW	Nikolić	(Montenegro)	11	32	5	—	10	2	20	2	2	1			
95	GK	Cojocaru	(Romania)				—									
Players from YS
15	RB	Mustață	(Romania)	1	2		—	1				1				
Players sold or loaned out during the season
30	CM	Băjenaru	(Romania)	1	2		—			1				1		GS: 1 LW
16	RW	Nicoliță	(Romania)	8	8		—	2		5				1		GS: 6 RW, 2 RB
22	CB	Galamaz	(Romania)	13	13	1	—	3	1	8		1		1		
3	LB	Emeghara	(Nigeria)	9	11		—	2		8		1				GS: 9 RB
47	DM	D. Popa	(Romania)	1	2	1	—			1		1	1			GS: 1 RW
5	DM	Brandán	(Argentina)	26	27		—	9		17				1		GS: 19 CM, 5 LB, 2 CB

Last updated: 20 May 2012 (UTC)
Source: Match reports in competitive matches, FCSB (in Romanian)
Ordered by start team, game starts and position on pitch (from back right to front left)
0 shown as blank

^{^1} Petrolul–Steaua match awarded to Steaua 0–3 after it was suspended in the 45+10 minute at the score of 0–2 for incidents with Petrolul supporters, the two goals scored of Bicfalvi and Mihai Costea goals was annulated.

Shirt numbers changed during the season
Player	New number	Old number
F. Costea	29	7

=== Goalscorers ===
Player	Liga I	Cupa României	Supercupa României	Europa League	Fixture Total	Friendlies	Total
(Romania) Raul Rusescu	13	0	0	2	15	8	23
(Romania) Mihai Costea	6^{^{1}}	0	0	1	7	3	10
(Romania) Cristian Tănase	4	0	0	3	7	2	9
(Brazil) Leandro Tatu	3	0	0	2	5	5	10
(Montenegro) Stefan Nikolić	2	1	0	2	5	4	9
(Serbia) Novak Martinović	4	1	0	0	5	2	7
(Bulgaria) Valentin Iliev	4	0	0	0	4	0	4
(Romania) Florin Costea	1	0	0	1	2	6	8
(Romania) Tiberiu Bălan	2	0	0	0	2	2	4
(Romania) Alexandru Chipciu	2	0	0	0	2	0	2
(Portugal) Geraldo Alves	1	0	0	0	1	0	1
(Romania) Paul Pârvulescu	1	0	0	0	1	0	1
(Romania) Iasmin Latovlevici	1	0	0	0	1	0	1
(Romania) Andrei Prepeliță	0	1	0	0	1	0	1
(Romania) Dorinel Popa	0	1	0	0	1	0	1
(Romania) George Galamaz	0	0	0	1	1	0	1
(Romania) Eric Bicfalvi	0^{^{1}}	0	0	0	0	5	5
(Brazil) Gabriel Machado	0	0	0	0	0	2	2
(Romania) Valeriu Lupu	0	0	0	0	0	1	1
(Romania) Bănel Nicoliță	0	0	0	0	0	1	1
(Romania) Liviu Băjenaru	0	0	0	0	0	1	1
(Romania) Iulian Roșu	0	0	0	0	0	1	1
(Romania) Ionuț Năstăsie	0	0	0	0	0	1	1
(Romania) Mihai Răduț	0	0	0	0	0	1	1
Players from youth system
(Romania) Alex Stanciu	0	0	0	0	0	1	1
Own goals
(Romania) Burchelea	0	0	0	0	0	1	1
(Romania) Petruț	0	0	0	0	0	1	1

^{^1} Petrolul–Steaua match awarded to Steaua 0–3 after it was suspended in the 45+10 minute at the score of 0–2 for incidents with Petrolul supporters, the two goals scored of Bicfalvi and Mihai Costea goals was annulated.

=== Goal minutes ===
1'–15'	16'–30'	31'–HT	46'–60'	61'–75'	76'–FT	Extra time	Forfeit
9	6	13	6	14	12	0	3^{^{1}}

Last updated:20 May 2012 (UTC)
Source: FCSB (in Romanian)

^{^1} Petrolul–Steaua match awarded to Steaua 0–3 after it was suspended in the 45+10 minute at the score of 0–2 for incidents with Petrolul supporters, the two goals scored of Bicfalvi and Mihai Costea goals was annulated.

=== Starting XI ===
No.	Pos.	Nat.	Name	MS	Notes
12	GK	(Romania)	Tătărușanu	35	
14	LB	(Romania)	Latovlevici	31	
23	CB	(Portugal)	Geraldo	28	+4 as RB
4	CB	(Bulgaria)	Iliev	29	
18	RB	(Serbia)	Martinović	22	+2 as CB
10	LW	(Romania)	Tănase	37	+2 as AM, 1 FW
55	CM	(Romania)	Bourceanu	32	+9 as DM
5	CM	(Argentina)	Brandán	19	+5 as LB, 2 CB
7	RW	(Romania)	Chipciu	14	
24	FW	(Romania)	Rusescu	22	+4 as RW
77	FW	(Brazil)	L. Tatu	23	+4 as RW, 4 AM, 3 SS

Last updated: 20 May 2012 (UTC)
Source: Squad stats and Start formations.
Only competitive matches.
Using the most used start formation.
Ordered by position on pitch (from back right to front left).

=== Squad stats ===
	Total	Home	Away	Neutral
Games played	47	23	23	1
Games won	23	16	7	0
Games drawn	12	4	8	0
Games lost	12	3	8	1
Biggest win	4–0 vs CS Mioveni; 4–0 vs Sănătatea Cluj	4–0 vs CS Mioveni; 4–0 vs Sănătatea Cluj	3–0^{1} vs Petrolul Ploiești	—
Biggest lose	5–0 vs Maccabi Haifa	2–1 vs Pandurii Târgu Jiu; 1–0 vs Twente; 1–0 vs FC Vaslui	5–0 vs Maccabi Haifa	1–0 vs Oțelul Galați
Clean sheets	16	10	6	0
Goals scored	63	41	22	0
Goals conceded	43	16	26	1
Goal difference	+20	+25	-4	-1
Top scorer	Rusescu (15)	9	6	0
Winning rate	48.94%	69.57%	30.43%	0%

Last updated: 20 May 2012 (UTC)
Source: Competitive matches

^{^1} Match awarded to Steaua 0–3 after it was suspended in the 45+10 minute at the score of 0–2 for incidents with Petrolul supporters, the two goals scored of Bicfalvi and Mihai Costea goals was annulated.

=== International appearances ===
Player	Country	Appearances	Goals
Valentin Iliev	Bulgaria	v. Bosnia and Herzegovina v. Netherlands v. Turkey	
Ciprian Tătărușanu	Romania	v. Bosnia and Herzegovina v. Brazil v. San Marino v. Luxembourg v. France v. Belgium v. Turkmenistan v. Uruguay v. Austria	
Iasmin Latovlevici	Romania	v. Brazil v. Paraguay v. Albania v. Uruguay	
Florin Gardoș	Romania	v. Brazil v. Paraguay v. San Marino v. Turkmenistan v. Austria	
Vlad Chiricheș	Romania	v. Turkmenistan v. Uruguay v. Switzerland v. Austria	
George Galamaz	Romania	v. Luxembourg	
Bănel Nicoliță	Romania	v. San Marino v. Luxembourg v. France	
Alexandru Bourceanu	Romania	v. France v. Belarus v. Albania v. Turkmenistan v. Uruguay v. Switzerland v. Austria	
Cristian Tănase	Romania	v. Bosnia and Herzegovina v. Brazil v. Paraguay v. San Marino v. Luxembourg v. France v. Belgium v. Greece v. Turkmenistan v. Uruguay v. Switzerland v. Austria	v. Greece v. Turkmenistan v. Turkmenistan
Alexandru Chipciu	Romania	v. Turkmenistan v. Switzerland v. Austria	
Romeo Surdu	Romania	v. Bosnia and Herzegovina v. Brazil v. Paraguay	
Stefan Nikolić	Montenegro U-21	v. Wales U-21 v. Wales U-21 v. Andorra U-21	v. Wales U-21 v. Andorra U-21
Valeriu Lupu	Romania U-21	v. Bulgaria U-21	
Bogdan Mustață	Romania U-21	v. France U-21	
Gabriel Matei	Romania U-21	v. Kazakhstan U-21	
Cosmin Matei	Romania U-21	v. Kazakhstan U-21	
Mihai Răduț	Romania U-21	v. Kazakhstan U-21 v. Slovakia U-21 v. Slovakia U-21	v. Slovakia U-21
Ionuț Năstăsie	Romania U-21	v. Bulgaria U-21 v. Latvia U-21	
Ionuț Năstăsie	Romania U-19	v. Czech Republic U-19 v. Greece U-19 v. Republic of Ireland U-19	

== Competitions ==
=== Overall ===
Competition	Started round	Final position / round	First match	Last match
Liga I	—	3rd	23 July 2011	20 May 2012
Cupa României	Round of 32	Round of 16	22 September 2011	27 October 2011
Supercupa României	Final	Runners-up	17 July 2011	
Europa League	Play-off round	Round of 32	18 August 2011	23 February 2012

=== Supercupa României ===
==== Results ====
17 July 2011 Final	Oțelul Galați	1–0	Steaua București	Piatra Neamț
20:45	Buș 14'; Paraschiv (yellow card) 40'; Antal (yellow card) 69'; Perendija (yellow card) 79'; Râpă (yellow card) 89'		(yellow card) 52' Bicfalvi; (yellow card) 58' Nicoliță; (yellow card) 59' Martinović; (yellow card) 66' Rusescu	Stadium: Ceahlăul; Attendance: 13,253; Referee: Robert Dumitru

=== Liga I ===
==== League table ====
Pos	Team	Pld	W	D	L	GF	GA	GD	Pts	Qualification or relegation
1	CFR Cluj (C)	34	21	8	5	63	31	+32	71	Qualification to Champions League third qualifying round
2	Vaslui	34	22	4	8	58	29	+29	70	Qualification to Champions League third qualifying round
3	Steaua București	34	19	9	6	47	26	+21	66	Qualification to Europa League third qualifying round
4	Rapid București	34	18	10	6	54	29	+25	64	Qualification to Europa League second qualifying round
5	Dinamo București	34	18	8	8	57	32	+25	62	Qualification to Europa League play-off round (Note: Dinamo București won the 2011–12 Cupa României so it qualified for the 2012–13 UEFA Europa League play-off round.)

Source: LPF (in Romanian)
Rules for classification: 1st points; 2nd overall goals difference; 3rd overall goals scored (until the end of the season)
(C) Champions

==== Results summary ====
Overall								Home						Away					
Pld	W	D	L	GF	GA	GD	Pts	W	D	L	GF	GA	GD	W	D	L	GF	GA	GD
34	19	9	6	47	26	+21	66	12	3	2	28	12	+16	7	6	4	19	14	+5

Source: LT

==== Results by round ====
Round	1	2	3	4	5	6	7	8	9	10	11	12	13	14	15	16	17	18	19	20	21	22	23	24	25	26	27	28	29	30	31	32	33	34
Ground	A	HR	HR	A	HR	A	HR	A	HR	A	H	A	H	A	H	A	H	H	A	A	H	A	H	A	H	A	H	A	H	A	H	A	H	A
Result	D	W	W	L	W	L	L	D	W	D	D	W	W	L	W	W	D	W	W	W	W	L	D	D	W	W	L	D	W	W	W	W	W	D
Position	8	4	2	4	3	6	7	9	8	8	8	7	5	8	6	4	6	4	4	4	4	4	4	4	3	3	5	5	5	4	3	3	3	3

Source: Matches
A = Away; H = Home; W = Win; D = Draw; L = Loss

==== Points by opponent ====
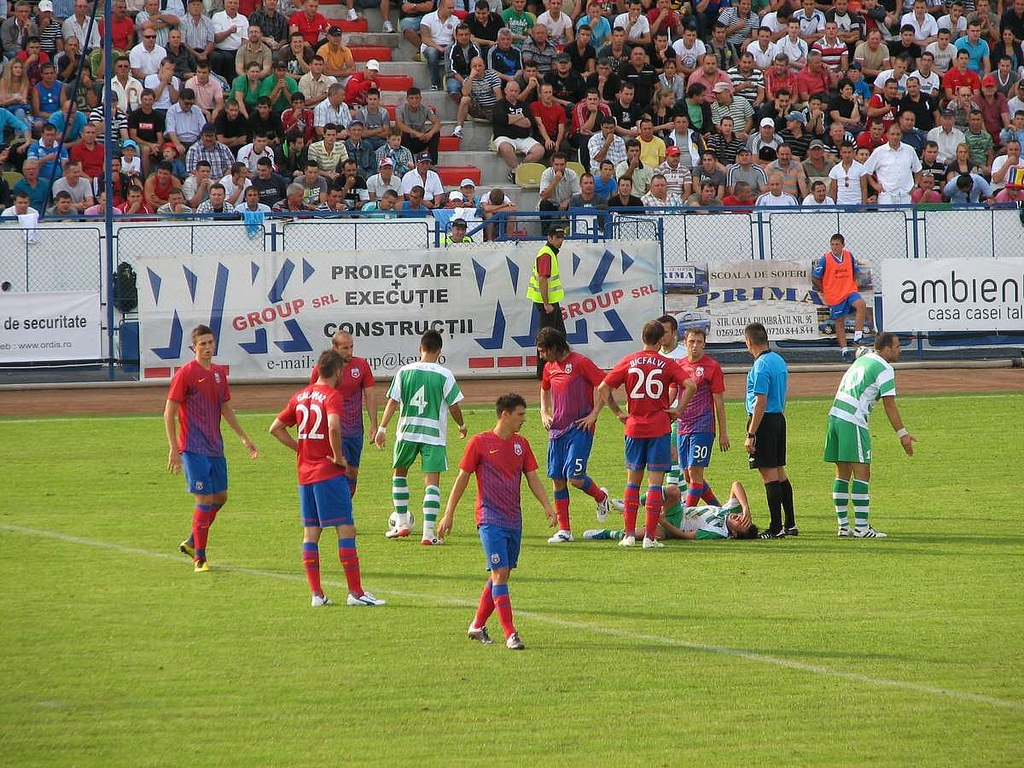
Steaua vs. Voința Sibiu, July 23, 2011

Team	Results		Points
Team	Home	Away	Points
Astra Ploiești	2–1	1–2	3
Brașov	1–0	2–1	6
Ceahlăul Piatra Neamț	1–0	0–1	3
CFR Cluj	1–1	1–1	2
Concordia Chiajna	2–1	2–0	6
Dinamo București	3–2	3–1	6
Gaz Metan Mediaș	0–0	0–3	1
Mioveni	4–0	1–0	6
Oțelul Galați	2–1	2–1	6
Pandurii Târgu Jiu	1–2	1–1	1
Petrolul Ploiești	2–1	3–0^{^{1}}	6
Rapid București	0–0	1–1	2
Sportul Studențesc București	4–1	0–0	4
Târgu Mureș	2–0	0–1	3
Universitatea Cluj	2–1	1–0	6
Vaslui	0–1	0–0	1
Voința Sibiu	1–0	1–1	4

Source: FCSB

^{^1} Match awarded to Steaua 0–3 after it was suspended in the 45+10 minute at the score of 0–2 for incidents with Petrolul supporters, the two goals scored of Bicfalvi and Mihai Costea goals was annulated.

==== Matches ====
23 July 2011 Round 1	Voința Sibiu	1–1	Steaua București	Sibiu
17:00	Tătar (yellow card) 24'; I. Popa (yellow card) 63'; Neguț 86'; Dănălache (yellow card) 90'; Dîlbea (yellow card) 90+1'	Report	(yellow card) 4' Rusescu; (yellow card) 12' Bicfalvi; 36' L. Tatu; (yellow card) 66' Latovlevici; (yellow card) 77' Gardoș	Stadium: Municipal; Attendance: 10,000; Referee: Cristian Balaj

31 July 2011 Round 2	Steaua București	4–0	Mioveni	Constanța
20:15	Tănase (penalty missed) 6' (pen.), (yellow card) 73', (goal) 78'; Bourceanu (yellow card) 37'; Iliev (yellow card) 38'; L. Tatu 44'; M. Costea 63'; Rusescu 87'; Răduț (red card) 89'	Report	(yellow card) 6' Hăisan; (yellow card) 39' Dina; (yellow card) 49' Margaritescu; (yellow card) 69' Tănasă; (yellow card) 72' Miulescu	Stadium: Farul; Attendance: 14,000; Referee: István Kovács

14 August 2011 Round 3	Steaua București	2–1	Universitatea Cluj	Ploiești
20:30	M. Costea 15'; Iliev (yellow card) 71'; Rusescu 75', (yellow card) 81'; Nikolić (yellow card) 88'; Latovlevici (yellow card) 90+2'	Report	(yellow card) 25' Cojocnean; (yellow card) 29' Niculescu; (yellow card) 69' Cristea; 76' Pelé; (yellow card) 85' Boștină	Stadium: Astra; Attendance: 7,500; Referee: Alexandru Deaconu

21 August 2011 Round 4	Astra Ploiești	2–1	Steaua București	Ploiești
22:00	N'Doye 38' (pen.); Fatai 53', (yellow card) 67'; Miranda (yellow card) 71'; Lung (yellow card) 90'	Report	(yellow card) 37' Geraldo; (yellow card) 59' Iliev; (yellow card) 69' Tănase; 90+2' M. Costea	Stadium: Astra; Attendance: 6,000; Referee: Ovidiu Hațegan

28 August 2011 Round 5	Steaua București	2–0	Târgu Mureș	Ploiești
22:00	Rusescu (yellow card) 11'; Bicfalvi (yellow card) 24'; Nicoliță (yellow card) 38'; Bourceanu (yellow card) 43'; Geraldo 45', (yellow card) 50'; Brandán (penalty missed) 69' (pen.); Martinović 87'	Report	(yellow card) 13' Celsinho; (yellow card) 34' (yellow-red card) 88' Vagner; (yellow card) 72' Issa Ba; (yellow card) 83' Iencsi; (yellow card) 84' Szilagyi	Stadium: Astra; Attendance: 2,000; Referee: Sebastian Colțescu

10 September 2011 Round 6	Gaz Metan Mediaș	3–0	Steaua București	Mediaș
21:30	Bawab 14' (pen.); Bud 61', 70'	Report	(yellow card) 36' Geraldo; (yellow card) 49' Bourceanu; (yellow card) 63' Latovlevici; (yellow card) 66' F. Costea	Stadium: Stadionul Gaz Metan; Attendance: 4,000; Referee: Alexandru Tudor

18 September 2011 Round 7	Steaua București	1–2	Pandurii Târgu Jiu	Ploiești
19:00	Rusescu 3'; Latovlevici (red card) 18'; Tănase (yellow card) 20'; Prepeliță (yellow card) 40'; Gardoș (red card) 87'; M. Costea (yellow card) 69'; Bourceanu (yellow card) 77'	Report	9' Voiculeț; 19' (pen.), (yellow card) 38' (yellow-red card) 90+13' Pintilii; (yellow card) 39' Băcilă; (yellow card) 62' Vranješ; (yellow card) 66' Cardoso	Stadium: Astra; Attendance: 3,000; Referee: István Kovács

25 September 2011 Round 8	Sportul Studențesc București	0–0	Steaua București	București
17:00	Lungu (yellow card) 19'; Chețan (yellow card) 53'	Report		Stadium: Regie; Attendance: 5,000; Referee: Radu Petrescu

2 October 2011 Round 9	Steaua București	2–1	Oțelul Galați	Buzău
21:30	Nikolić 61' (pen.); Iliev (yellow card) 77'; F. Costea 90+2', (yellow card) 90+3'; Bourceanu (yellow card) 90+3'	Report	15' Punoševac; (yellow card) 53' Sălăgeanu; (yellow card) 61' Skubic; (yellow card) 90+3' Perendija	Stadium: Municipal; Attendance: 10,000; Referee: Alexandru Tudor

16 October 2011 Round 10	Vaslui	0–0	Steaua București	Vaslui
21:30	Costin (yellow card) 87'	Report	(penalty missed) 8' (pen.) F. Costea; (yellow card) 33' Martinović; (yellow card) 74' Bicfalvi	Stadium: Municipal; Attendance: 7,000; Referee: Cristian Balaj

24 October 2011 Round 11	Steaua București	0–0	Rapid București	București
20:00	Prepeliță (red card) 61'; Martinović (yellow card) 84'	Report	(yellow card) 59' Burcă; (red card) 61' Alexa; (red card) 75' Ezequias; (yellow card) 89' Surdu; (yellow card) 90+2' Rui Duarte; (yellow card) 90+5' Straton	Stadium: Arena Națională; Attendance: 41,432; Referee: Alexandru Tudor

30 October 2011 Round 12	Petrolul Ploiești	0–3 (Awarded)	Steaua București	Ploiești
21:30		Report	35' Bicfalvi; (yellow card) 41' L. Tatu; (red card) 45+1' Martinović; (red card) 45+1' Stanca; (yellow card) 45+2' F. Costea; 45+7' (pen.) M. Costea	Stadium: Ilie Oană; Referee: Robert Dumitru
Note: Match awarded to Steaua 0–3 after it was suspended in the 45+10 minute at the score of 0–2 for incidents with Petrolul supporters, the two goals scored of Bicfalvi and Mihai Costea goals were erased.

6 November 2011 Round 13	Steaua București	2–1	Concordia Chiajna	București
21:30	Tănase 48'; Rusescu 73'	Report	33' Munteanu; (yellow card) 38' Mamele; (yellow card) 40' Bozga	Stadium: Arena Națională; Attendance: 12,000; Referee: Marius Bocăneală

20 November 2011 Round 14	Ceahlăul Piatra Neamț	1–0	Steaua București	Piatra Neamț
20:30	Monroy (yellow card) 47'; Stana 51'; Gafiţa (yellow card) 71'	Report	(yellow card) 12' Brandán; (yellow card) 65' Galamaz	Stadium: Ceahlăul; Attendance: 7,000; Referee: Marius Avram

26 November 2011 Round 15	Steaua București	1–0	Brașov	București
20:00	Bicfalvi (yellow card) 35'; Rusescu 44' (pen.)	Report	(yellow card) 26' Machado; (yellow card) 71' Distéfano	Stadium: Arena Națională; Attendance: 10,230; Referee: Alexandru Deaconu

5 December 2011 Round 16	Dinamo București	1–3	Steaua București	București
20:30	Niculae 20' (pen.); Moți (yellow card) 87'	Report	22', 59' Rusescu; (yellow card) 32' Brandán; 90+2' M. Costea	Stadium: Dinamo; Referee: Cristian Balaj

10 December 2011 Round 17	Steaua București	1–1	CFR Cluj	București
20:00	Nikolić (yellow card) 27'; Geraldo (yellow card) 33'; M. Costea 75', (yellow card) 75'; Bicfalvi (yellow card) 89'; Rusescu (yellow card) 90+1'	Report	(yellow card) 10' (yellow-red card) 85' Mureșan; 15' Kapetanos; (yellow card) 18' Peralta; (yellow card) 54' Panin; (yellow card) 60' Piccolo; (yellow card) 62' Beto; (red card) 85' Weldon; (yellow card) 90+4' Cadú	Stadium: Arena Națională; Attendance: 35,000; Referee: Cristian Balaj

19 December 2011 Round 18	Steaua București	1–0	Voința Sibiu	București
20:30	M. Costea (yellow card) 26'; Iliev 37'	Report	(yellow card) 23' I. Popa	Stadium: Arena Națională; Attendance: 11,000; Referee: Augustus Constantin

4 March 2012 Round 19	Mioveni	0–1	Steaua București	Mioveni
21:30	Crăciun (yellow card) 35'; Ionescu (yellow card) 70'; Enache (yellow card) 76'		12' Rusescu; (yellow card) 32' Tănase; (yellow card) 49' Chiricheș; (yellow card) 87' Machado	Stadium: Dacia; Referee: Robert Dumitru

12 March 2012 Round 20	Universitatea Cluj	0–1	Steaua București	Cluj
19:00	Niculescu (yellow card) 49'; Cristescu (yellow card) 59'; Păcurar (yellow card) 63'		37' Rusescu; (yellow card) 67' Bicfalvi; (yellow card) 90+1' Pârvulescu	Stadium: Cluj Arena; Referee: Alexandru Tudor

18 March 2012 Round 21	Steaua București	2–1	Astra Ploiești	București
20:30	Rusescu 21'; Pârvulescu 35'; Dănănae (yellow card) 50'		12' Laionel; (yellow card) 16' Țigănașu	Stadium: Steaua; Referee: Paul Unimatan

22 March 2012 Round 22	Târgu Mureș	1–0	Steaua București	Târgu Mureș
21:30	Ilyéș 14', (yellow card) 61'; Firțulescu (yellow card) 14'; Astafei (yellow card) 41'; Nicu (yellow card) 75'; G. Kiriță (yellow card) 86'; Subotić (yellow card) 90+2'		(yellow card) 31' Geraldo; (yellow card) 87' Chipciu	Stadium: Trans-Sil; Referee: Cristian Balaj

26 March 2012 Round 23	Steaua București	0–0	Gaz Metan Mediaș	București
21:30	Iliev (yellow card) 28'; Bicfalvi (yellow card) 32'; Geraldo (yellow card) 90+3'		(yellow card) 17' Vitinho; (yellow card) 44' Issa Ba; (yellow card) 60' Marković; (yellow card) 76' Tahar; (yellow card) 86' Pleșca	Stadium: Steaua; Referee: Dragoș Istrate

31 March 2012 Round 24	Pandurii Târgu Jiu	1–1	Steaua București	Târgu Jiu
21:30	Cristea (yellow card) 8'; Voiculeț (yellow card) 11'; Pintilii (yellow card) 43'; Maxim 81', (yellow card) 81'; Nistor (yellow card) 89'		(yellow card) 36' L. Tatu; 75' Chipciu; (yellow card) 76' Bourceanu	Stadium: Tudor Vladimirescu; Referee: Marius Avram

8 April 2012 Round 25	Steaua București	4–1	Sportul Studențesc București	București
21:30	T. Bălan 6'; Rusescu 8'; Tănase 35'; Pârvulescu (yellow card) 46'; Geraldo (yellow card) 67'; Chipciu 76'		66' S. Stancu	Stadium: Steaua; Referee: Cătălin Popa

14 April 2012 Round 26	Oțelul Galați	1–2	Steaua București	Galați
20:00	Didi 34'; Antal (yellow card) 54'		(yellow card) 21' Pârvulescu; (yellow card) 45' Iliev; 49' L. Tatu; (yellow card) 65' Chipciu; 67', (yellow card) 68' M. Costea; (yellow card) 90' Tătărușanu	Stadium: Oțelul; Referee: Alexandru Tudor

20 April 2012 Round 27	Steaua București	0–1	Vaslui	București
20:20	Latovlevici (yellow card) 28'		(yellow card) 16' Anderson; (yellow card) 29' Costin; (yellow card) 47' Papp; 59' Wesley; (yellow card) 72' Sânmărtean	Stadium: Steaua; Referee: Milorad Mažić (Serbia)

29 April 2012 Round 28	Rapid București	1–1	Steaua București	București
21:30	Alexa (yellow card) 27'; Grigore 33'; F. Teixeira (yellow card) 77'		(yellow card) 10' Bicfalvi; 29' Tănase; (yellow card) 75' Geraldo; (yellow card) 80' Latovlevici; (yellow card) 88' Tătărușanu	Stadium: Giuleşti-Valentin Stănescu; Referee: Miroslav Zelinka (Czech Republic)

3 May 2012 Round 29	Steaua București	2–1	Petrolul Ploiești	București
19:30	T. Bălan 39'; Chiricheș (yellow card) 42'; Nikolić (yellow card) 47', (goal) 82'; Rusescu (yellow card) 79'		(yellow card) 8' Maxim; 33' Hamza; (yellow card) 58' Khamutowski	Stadium: Steaua; Referee: Robert Dumitru

7 May 2012 Round 30	Concordia Chiajna	0–2	Steaua București	Chiajna
19:00	Krumov (yellow card) 9'; Iancu (red card) 88'		7' Iliev; (yellow card) 24' Latovlevici; (yellow card) 33', (goal) 73' Martinović; (red card) 36' Chipciu; (yellow card) 41' T. Bălan; (yellow card) 61' Rusescu; (yellow card) 68' Bourceanu	Stadium: Concordia; Referee: Augustus Constantin

10 May 2012 Round 31	Steaua București	1–0	Ceahlăul Piatra Neamț	București
21:30	Tănase (yellow card) 36'; Martinović 61'		(yellow card) 28' Cazan	Stadium: Steaua; Referee: Paul Unimatan

13 May 2012 Round 32	Brașov	1–2	Steaua București	Brașov
21:30	Ionescu (yellow card) 45'; Moutinho 47'; Hadnagy (yellow card) 79'		14' Martinović; 18' (pen.) Rusescu; (yellow card) 31' T. Bălan; (yellow card) 69' Gardoș; (yellow card) 77' L. Tatu	Stadium: Silviu Ploeșteanu; Referee: Ovidiu Hațegan

17 May 2012 Round 33	Steaua București	3–2	Dinamo București	București
21:45	Rusescu 43' (pen.); Iliev 48', 64'; Latovlevici (yellow card) 73'		21', (yellow card) 34' Curtean; 86', (yellow card) 90+3' Țucudean	Stadium: Arena Națională; Attendance: 47,698; Referee: Olegário Benquerença (Portugal)

20 May 2012 Round 34	CFR Cluj	1–1	Steaua București	Cluj-Napoca
20:00	Nuno Diogo (yellow card) 9'; Lionn (yellow card) 41'; Mureșan (yellow card) 65'; Nicoară (yellow card) 71'; De Zerbi 90'		(yellow card) 33' Gardoș; (yellow card) 36' Tănase; 44' (pen.) Latovlevici; (yellow card) 69' Martinović	Stadium: Dr. Constantin Rădulescu; Referee: Deniz Aytekin (Germany)

=== Cupa României ===
==== Results ====
22 September 2011 Round of 32	Steaua București	4–0	Sănătatea Cluj	Buzău
20:30	Nikolić 3', (yellow card) 45'; Prepeliță 31'; Martinović 50'; D. Popa 87'		(yellow card) 65' Șoș	Stadium: Municipal; Referee: Florin Ghimbășan

27 October 2011 Round of 16	Timișoara	2–0	Steaua București	Timișoara
20:45	Ricketts 27'; Scutaru (yellow card) 30'; Goga 51'		(yellow card) 30' F. Costea; (yellow card) 60' Bourceanu; (yellow card) 90+2' Rusescu; (yellow card) 90+2' Nikolić	Stadium: Dan Păltinișanu; Referee: Cristian Balaj

=== UEFA Europa League ===
==== Play-off round ====
18 August 2011 First leg	Steaua București (Romania)	2–0	(Bulgaria) CSKA Sofia	Cluj, Romania
20:30	Galamaz 16'; Tănase (yellow card) 41'; Bourceanu (yellow card) 55'; L. Tatu 77'; Nicoliță (yellow card) 90+1'		(yellow card) 34' Platini; (yellow card) 38' Ademar; (yellow card) 72' Yanchev	Stadium: Dr. Constantin Rădulescu; Referee: Tommy Skjerven (Norway)

25 August 2011 Second leg	CSKA Sofia (Bulgaria)	1–1 (1–3 agg.)	(Romania) Steaua București	Sofia, Bulgaria
20:30	Platini (yellow card) 67', (goal) 83'		(yellow card) 39' Galamaz; (yellow card) 67' Nicoliță; (yellow card) 69', (goal) 73' Tănase	Stadium: Vasil Levski; Referee: Pol van Boekel (Netherlands)

==== Group stage ====
Pos	Team	Pld	W	D	L	GF	GA	GD	Pts	Qualification
1	(Germany) Schalke 04	6	4	2	0	13	2	+11	14	Advance to knockout phase
2	(Romania) Steaua București	6	2	2	2	9	11	−2	8	Advance to knockout phase
3	(Israel) Maccabi Haifa	6	2	0	4	10	12	−2	6	
4	(Cyprus) AEK Larnaca	6	1	2	3	4	11	−7	5	

Source: Soccerway

===== Results =====
15 September 2011 Matchday 1	Steaua București (Romania)	0–0	(Germany) Schalke 04	Cluj, Romania
22:05	Bourceanu (yellow card) 42'; Brandán (yellow card) 49'	Report	(yellow card) 39' Papadopoulos; (yellow card) 49' Farfán	Stadium: Dr. Constantin Rădulescu; Referee: Michael Koukoulakis (Greece)

29 September 2011 Matchday 2	AEK Larnaca (Cyprus)	1–1	(Romania) Steaua București	Nicosia, Cyprus
20:00	Skopelitis (yellow card) 56'; Miljan 59'; Pintado (yellow card) 84'; Demetriou (yellow card) 88'	Report	65' M. Costea; (yellow card) 79' (yellow-red card) 82' Brandán; (yellow card) 83' Prepeliță	Stadium: GSP; Referee: Mark Courtney (Northern Ireland)

20 October 2011 Matchday 3	Maccabi Haifa (Israel)	5–0	(Romania) Steaua București	Ramat Gan, Israel
20:00	Amashe 10', 20'; Yahaya (yellow card) 23'; Katan 38' (pen.), (penalty missed) 65' (pen.); Twatiha 72'; Vered 79'	Report	(yellow card) 24' Latovlevici; (red card) 37' Bicfalvi; (yellow card) 56' L. Tatu; (red card) 64' Iliev	Stadium: Ramat Gan; Referee: Daniel Stålhammar (Sweden)

3 November 2011 Matchday 4	Steaua București (Romania)	4–2	(Israel) Maccabi Haifa	București, Romania
22:05	L. Tatu 13'; Rusescu (yellow card) 26'; F. Costea 28', (red card) 60'; Bourceanu (yellow card) 32'; Tănase 64', 84', (yellow card) 84'; Nikolić (yellow card) 89'	Report	36' Meshumar; 40' Katan; (yellow card) 69' Golasa; (yellow card) 90' Amashe	Stadium: Arena Națională; Attendance: 31,233; Referee: Kevin Blom (Netherlands)

1 December 2011 Matchday 5	Schalke 04 (Germany)	2–1	(Romania) Steaua București	Gelsenkirchen, Germany
20:00	Papadopoulos 25'; Jones (yellow card) 48'; Raúl 57'	Report	33' Rusescu; (yellow card) 77' Martinović	Stadium: Veltins-Arena; Attendance: 53,123; Referee: Antonio Mateu Lahoz (Spain)

14 December 2011 Matchday 6	Steaua București (Romania)	3–1	(Cyprus) AEK Larnaca	București, Romania
22:05	Iliev (yellow card) 45+1'; Bourceanu (yellow card) 56'; Rusescu 55' (pen.); Nikolić 70', 85', (yellow card) 71'	Report	(yellow card) 36', (goal) 61' Pintado; (yellow card) 72' Priso; (yellow card) 86' de Cler	Stadium: Arena Națională; Attendance: 50,051; Referee: Said Ennjimi (France)

==== Round of 32 ====
16 February 2012 First leg	Steaua București (Romania)	0–1	(Netherlands) Twente	București, Romania
22:05	Dănănae (yellow card) 16'; Martinović (yellow card) 55'; Bicfalvi (yellow card) 90+3'		53' John	Stadium: Arena Națională; Referee: Mark Clattenburg (England)

23 February 2012 Second leg	Twente (Netherlands)	1–0 (2–0 agg.)	(Romania) Steaua București	Enschede, Netherlands
20:00	Chadli 29', (yellow card) 32'; Fer (yellow card) 33'		(yellow card) 45' Geraldo; (yellow card) 56' Bourceanu; (yellow card) 56' L. Tatu	Stadium: De Grolsch Veste; Referee: Robert Schörgenhofer (Austria)

=== Non competitive matches ===
23 June 2011 Matchday 1	Steaua București (Romania)	1–0	(Georgia (country)) Zestaponi	Bischofshofen, Austria
18:30	L. Tatu 41'

28 June 2011 Matchday 2	Steaua București (Romania)	1–1	(Germany) Fortuna Düsseldorf	Bischofshofen, Austria
18:30	Tănase 10' (pen.)		81' (pen.) Langeneke

4 July 2011 Matchday 3	Steaua București (Romania)	2–2	(Brazil) Comercial	Austria
19:30	Bicfalvi 14'; M. Costea 48'		81', 86' (pen.) Costa

6 July 2011 Matchday 4	Steaua București (Romania)	0–0	(Russia) Krasnodar	Austria
20:45

8 July 2011 Matchday 5	Steaua București (Romania)	2–0	(Moldova) Rapid Chișinău	Austria
20:00	Rusescu 14'; Nicoliță 84' (pen.)

10 July 2011 Matchday 6	Steaua București (Romania)	1–0	(Turkey) Bursaspor	Austria
	Nicoliță (penalty missed) 26' (pen.); Bicfalvi 40'

13 July 2011 Matchday 7	Steaua București (Romania)	1–1	(Croatia) Zagreb	Austria
	Băjenaru 85'		55' Šovšić

4 August 2011 Matchday 8	Steaua București (Romania)	4–0	(Romania) Tunari	Buftea, Romania
	Nikolić 4', 52'; Burchelea 48' (o.g.); Rusescu 54'

10 August 2011 Matchday 9	Steaua București (Romania)	0–0	(Romania) Lindab Ștefănești	Buftea, Romania

31 August 2011 Matchday 10	Steaua București (Romania)	7–0	(Romania) Tunari	Romania
	F. Costea 6', 19'; Martinović 10'; Rusescu 29', 36'; L. Tatu 66'; Lupu 73'

7 September 2011 Matchday 11	Steaua București (Romania)	3–0	(Romania) Buftea	Romania
	F. Costea 16', 50'; M. Costea 42'

8 October 2011 Matchday 12	Steaua București (Romania)	4–1	(Romania) Sportul Studențesc București	Ploiești, Romania
	L. Tatu 17'; Bicfalvi 47'; T. Bălan 58'; Roșu 70'		90' Nistor	Stadium: Conpet

12 November 2011 Matchday 13	Steaua București (Romania)	6–0	(Romania) Argeșul Mihăilești	Buftea, Romania
	Petruț 20' (o.g.); Rusescu 23'; Bicfalvi 29'; Năstăsie 34'; F. Costea 41'; Stanciu 88'

29 January 2012 Matchday 14	Steaua București (Romania)	2–1	(Bulgaria) Levski Sofia	Turkey
18:00	Tănase 40' (pen.); Rusescu 74' (pen.)		39' Tsvetkov

31 January 2012 Matchday 15	Steaua București (Romania)	2–1	(Poland) Legia Warsaw	Turkey
17:30	F. Costea 21'; L. Tatu 35'		47' Rybus

2 February 2012 Matchday 16	Steaua București (Romania)	2–3	(Czech Republic) Mladá Boleslav	Turkey
19:15	Nikolić 45+1'; Machado 86'		34' Zahustel; 58', 79' Štohanzl

4 February 2012 Matchday 17	Steaua București (Romania)	1–4	(Romania) Concordia Chiajna	Turkey
17:00	Martinović 35'		12' Munteanu; 28' Alex; (penalty missed) 52' (pen.) Dinu; 56', 57' Rocha

5 February 2012 Matchday 18	Steaua București (Romania)	3–0	(Russia) Kuban Krasnodar	Aksu, Turkey
20:00	L. Tatu 25'; Nikolić 45+2'; Rusescu (penalty missed) 58' (pen.), 66'		(penalty missed) 84' (pen.), (penalty missed) 85' (pen.) Davydov	Stadium: Mardan

8 February 2012 Matchday 19	Steaua București (Romania)	1–0	(Hungary) Debrecen	Aksu, Turkey
19:30	Bicfalvi 40'			Stadium: Mardan
Note: The match was played only with the first half due to rain.

18 February 2012 Matchday 20	Steaua București (Romania)	2–0	(Romania) Juventus București	Buftea, Romania
	Răduț 28'; Machado 29'

29 February 2012 Matchday 21	Farul Constanța (Romania)	1–2	(Romania) Steaua București	Constanța, Romania
	Pătulea 36' (pen.)		18' Rusescu; 73' T. Bălan

7 March 2012 Matchday 22	Steaua București (Romania)	1–1	(Romania) Astra II Giurgiu	Mogoșoaia, Romania
	M. Costea 23'		42' Hoprich

== UEFA Club rankings ==
This is the current UEFA Club Rankings, including season 2010–11.

Rank	Team	Points	Mvmnt
62	(Russia) Rubin Kazan	31.941	▲ (+32)
63	(Belgium) Club Brugge	31.400	▼ (–6)
64	(Greece) AEK Athens	30.833	▲ (+13)
65	(Czech Republic) Sparta Prague	30.170	▲ (+9)
66	(England) Blackburn Rovers	30.157	▲ (+4)
67	(Romania) Steaua București	29.164	▼ (–27)
68	(England) Bolton Wanderers	29.157	▼ (–16)
69	(England) Aston Villa	28.157	▲ (+9)
70	(Germany) Hertha	27.887	▼ (–11)
71	(Spain) Celta de Vigo	27.465	▲ (+4)
72	(Italy) Sampdoria	27.110	▼ (–3)
