= CSO Băicoi =

Romanian football club

- Full name: Clubul Sportiv Orășenesc Băicoi
- Nicknames: Băicoienii (The people from Băicoi)
- Short name: Băicoi
- Founded: 1923; 103 years ago as CS Băicoi
- Stadium: Petrolul
- Capacity: 1,500
- Owner: Băicoi Town
- General manager: Toni Ioniță
- Head coach: Tiberiu Bălan
- League: Liga III
- 2025–26: Liga III, Seria IV, 6th
- Website: https://csobaicoi.ro
Home colours	Away colours

Clubul Sportiv Orășenesc Băicoi, commonly known as CSO Băicoi or simply as Băicoi, is a Romanian football club based in Băicoi, Prahova County, currently competes in Liga III, the third tier of Romanian football.

== History ==
=== Early history and Lower Leagues Football (1923–1977) ===
The first football club in Băicoi was founded in 1923, as reported by the newspaper "Ecoul Sportiv" about the first football match in Băicoi – "Sunday, 15 July 1923, a football match was played on the field of the Club Sportiv Băicoi, between Băicoi and Principesa Ileana Câmpina teams".

The club changed its name in 1924 to Româno-Americană Băicoi, being financially sustained by the Romanian-American Oil Company through Băicoi oil extraction scaffold, and continued the football activity in the interwar period and after the Second World War in the Prahova District and Regional Championships.

In 1948 was renamed Sindicatul Petrolist (Petroleum Syndicate), which later became the Partizanul Sovrom Petrol (1950), Flacăra (1952), Energia (1956), and from 1957 Petrolul Băicoi.

After a constant presence in the top tier of regional football, Petrolul, even though finished in 9th place, was relegated at the end of 1960–61 season, due to the Ploiești Regional Championship was reduced to a single series of fourteen teams

in the 1963–64 season, Petrolul Băicoi won the Series II-a of Câmpina District Championship, but lost the promotion finishing 4th in the Series I at the final tournament held at Ploiești.

Petrolul, coached by Theodor Beffa, promoted to Ploiești Regional Championship at the end the 1965–66 season and played the following two seasons in the West Series of the Regional Championship ranking 4th (1966–67) and 6th (1967–68), under the leadership of Gheorghe Gavriloaie.

In the next nine seasons, Petrolul played in the new Prahova County Championship always being a top-table team, finishing twice as runners-up, in 1969–70 and 1971–72 (coach Petre Babone) seasons and three times in 3rd place, in 1970–71, 1972–73 and 1973–74 seasons.

Petrolul managed to get on the stage of Romanian football at the end of the 1976–77 season winning the County Championship and the promotion play-off against Forestierul Covasna (2–0 at home and 1–2 away), the Covasna County Championship winner. The squad led by Mihai Opatchi was composed of Paul Constantinescu, Ion Tudose – Liviu Istrate, Ion Nemeș, Ion Pop, Gabriel Simionescu, Alexandru Șerban, Adrian Șandru, Tiberiu Argăseală, Adrian Aelenei, Ion Bogaciu, Adrian Ciufu, Alexandru Bucică, Adrian Filcea, Gheorghe Despa, Sorin Corbu, Dan Grigore, Ion Niculescu, Ștefan Ocheșelu, Marin Niculescu, Ion Sima and Alexandru Stancu.

=== National Leagues Experience and Decline (1977–2019) ===
Petrolul played in the following decade in Divizia C, and the best performances achieved were 6th place in the 1977–78 and 1980–81 championship editions, being coached during this period by Mihai Opatchi, Vasile Florea, Adrian Aelenei and Gheorghe Pahonțu. Also, the club was renamed Petrolul FSH Băicoi in 1984, as F.E.H.S Băicoi (Fabrica de Echipamente Hidraulice și Scule – lit. 'Factory of Hydraulic Equipment and Tools') started to financially support the team.

In the summer of 1989, F.E.H.S withdraw the financial support offered to and Petrolul enter in decline, relegating at the end of the 1989–90 season after finishing last in its series and continued to play for the next seventeen years on the first stage of the Prahova County Championship.

In the 2006–07 season, The Oilmen suffered another relegation after finished in the bottom position of the league table with just four victories all season.

In the 2015–16 season, Petrolul, guided by Eugen Codreanu as player-coach, won Liga V – Prahova County, returning to the fourth tier after a nine-year absence. Despite a solid 2016–17 campaign, which ended with a 7th-place finish, financial difficulties emerged as the oil scaffold union reduced its support. The club ceded its place in Liga IV to CS Câmpina and enrolled in the fifth league, finishing 13th in the 2017–18 season.

In the 2018–19 season, Petrolul competed in Liga V – Prahova County, won the league, and secured promotion to Liga IV. The 2019–20 season ended with a 13th-place finish.

=== CSO Băicoi and the Return to the Third League (2019–Present) ===
CSO Băicoi was founded in 2019 by the Băicoi City Hall and entered Liga V – Prahova County, winning the competition and earning promotion to Liga IV. After Petrolul Băicoi ceased activity in 2021, CSO Băicoi assumed the local football legacy, continuing the tradition in the town.

In the 2021–22 season, the club finished 17th, narrowly avoiding relegation. In the 2022–23 season, after earning just one point in the first two rounds, Marian Teodorescu was dismissed, and Nouraș Nicorescu was appointed as the new head coach in September 2022. Nicorescu remained in charge until the end of the first half of the season, after which he was replaced by Robert Lungu. Following this change, the team improved and eventually finished the season in 5th place.

In the 2023–24 season, with Valentin Lazăr appointed as head coach, CSO Băicoi won Liga IV – Prahova County and qualified for the promotion play-off to Liga III. The team triumphed against the Giurgiu County winners, FC Bolintin Malu Spart, with a 3–3 draw in the first leg at Bolintin Vale and a 2–1 victory in the return leg at Băicoi.

The team led by Valentin Lazăr finished the 2024–25 regular season of Liga III in 2nd place in Series VI and also placed 2nd in the series play-off. Despite qualifying for the promotion play-off, it was disqualified for not meeting the Romanian Football Federation’s requirements regarding youth teams.

In August 2025, Băicoi reached the Cupa României play-off round, defeating Plopeni (2–1 aet) and Chindia Târgoviște (3–2 aet), before losing 2–3 to second-tier side Gloria Bistrița. Subsequently, in December 2025, during the 2025–26 Liga III campaign, Lazăr left the club after two and a half years and was replaced by Dragoș Mihalache.

== Honours ==
Liga III

- Runners-up (1): 2024–25

Liga IV – Prahova County

- Winners (2): 1976–77, 2023–24
- Runners-up (3): 1969–70, 1971–72, 2020–21

Liga V – Prahova County

- Winners (2): 2015–16, 2018–19

== Players ==
=== First team squad ===
As of 10 September 2024

Note: Flags indicate national team as defined under FIFA eligibility rules; some limited exceptions apply. Players may hold more than one non-FIFA nationality.

No.	Pos.	Nation	Player
1	GK	ROU	Cristian Toilă
2	DF	ROU	Adrian Prepeliță
4	MF	ROU	Ștefan Bunescu
5	DF	ROU	Mario Toporan
6	MF	ROU	Silviu Bineață
7	MF	ROU	Narcis Țînțaru
8	FW	ROU	Alessio Tudor
9	FW	ROU	Silviu Ariciu
10	FW	ROU	Dănuț Iancu (Captain)
11	MF	ROU	Florinel Sandu
12	GK	ROU	Mihai Vanghele
13	MF	ROU	David Brăilă

No.	Pos.	Nation	Player
14	MF	ROU	Andrei Toma
15	MF	ROU	Alin Budacă
16	DF	ROU	Ștefan Ghinea
17	MF	ROU	Cristian Gavrilă
19	DF	ROU	Claudiu Stoica
20	MF	ROU	Marian Mihalcea
21	FW	ROU	Constantin Stoica
23	MF	ROU	Patrick Bărbuțan
30	MF	ROU	Ionuț Stanciu
91	MF	ROU	Alexandru Dușamanu
95	DF	ROU	Eugen Matei
99	GK	ROU	Cosmin Tudor

=== Out on loan ===
Note: Flags indicate national team as defined under FIFA eligibility rules; some limited exceptions apply. Players may hold more than one non-FIFA nationality.

No. / Pos. / Nation / Player	No. / Pos. / Nation / Player

== Club officials ==
=== Board of directors ===
Role	Name
Owner	(Romania) Băicoi Town
General manager	(Romania) Toni Ioniță

=== Current technical staff ===
Role	Name
Manager	(Romania) Tiberiu Bălan
Assistant Coach	(Romania) Constantin Stoica

== League history ==
Season	Tier	Division	Place	Notes	Cupa României
2025–26	3	Liga III (Seria IV)	TBD		Play-off round
2024–25	3	Liga III (Seria VI)	2nd		
2023–24	4	Liga IV (PH)	1st (C)	Promoted	

Season	Tier	Division	Place	Notes	Cupa României
2022–23	4	Liga IV (PH)	5th		
2021–22	4	Liga IV (PH)	17th		
