= Florin Gardoș =

Romanian footballer

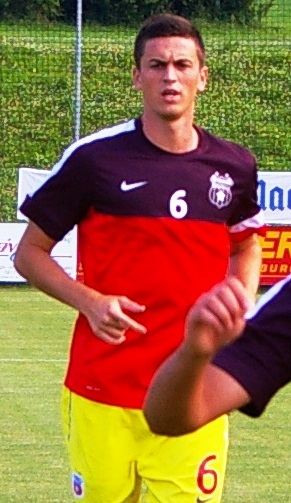
- Gardoș training for Steaua Bucuresti in 2012

Personal information
- Date of birth: 29 October 1988 (age 38)
- Place of birth: Satu Mare, Romania
- Height: 1.93 m (6 ft 4 in)
- Position: Centre-back

Team information
- Current team: Chindia Târgoviște (general manager)

Youth career
- 1998–2001: Olimpia Satu Mare
- 2001–2003: CSȘ Satu Mare
- 2003–2004: Florența Odoreu
- 2004–2006: Someșul Satu Mare
- 2006–2008: Concordia Chiajna

Senior career*
Years	Team	Apps	(Gls)
2004–2006	Someșul Satu Mare		
2006–2010	Concordia Chiajna	51	(1)
2010–2014	Steaua București	81	(3)
2014–2018	Southampton	11	(0)
2018	→ Universitatea Craiova (loan)	3	(0)
2018–2020	Universitatea Craiova	4	(0)
2019	→ Politehnica Iași (loan)	14	(1)
2020–2022	Academica Clinceni	34	(0)
2023	Sparta Râmnicu Valcea	3	(0)
Total		201	(5)

International career
2007	Romania U19	1	(0)
2009–2010	Romania U21	9	(1)
2011–2017	Romania	14	(0)

Managerial career
- 2026–: Chindia Târgoviște (general manager)
- * Club domestic league appearances and goals

Florin Gardoș (Romanian pronunciation: [floˈrin ˈɡardoʃ]; born 29 October 1988) is a Romanian former professional footballer who played as a centre-back, currently general manager at Liga II club Chindia Târgoviște.

== Early life ==
Gardoș was born in the city of Satu Mare in Romania.

== Club career ==
Gardoș started his senior career with Concordia Chiajna in 2006. In his first season at the club, he helped them achieve promotion to the second division.

=== Steaua București ===
On 17 June 2010, Gardoș was transferred to Steaua București. He made his competitive debut for the Roș-albaștrii on 16 August, in a Liga I match against Victoria Brănești.

In September 2011, Gardoș received a ten-match ban after seriously tackling Pandurii Târgu Jiu midfielder Cosmin Băcilă, which resulted in a broken left tibia and fibula.

=== Southampton ===
On 14 August 2014, Gardoș signed a four-year deal with English club Southampton for an undisclosed fee, believed to be around €7.5 million. On 13 September, he made his first appearance for "the Saints" as an 89th-minute substitute for Jack Cork in a 4–0 Premier League victory over Newcastle United. His first start came on 23 September in a 2–1 away defeat of Arsenal in the League Cup.

On 23 July 2015, Southampton manager Ronald Koeman announced that Gardoș would be sidelined for up to seven months after suffering a knee injury in a pre-season friendly with Feyenoord. He finally made his return to the first team in a 5–0 FA Cup loss to Arsenal on 28 January 2017.

=== Universitatea Craiova ===
On 19 February 2018, the last day of the winter transfer window in Romania, Gardoș joined Universitatea Craiova on loan for the remainder of the campaign. He made his debut on 31 March in a league fixture against CFR Cluj, which finished 0–0. Gardoș played a further three matches in all competitions before suffering a strain on 28 April which effectively ended his season.

As his contract with Southampton was not renewed, he chose to stay in Oltenia, and signed a two-year contract with Universitatea Craiova.

== International career ==
Gardoș made his senior debut for Romania in a friendly game against Ukraine, on 8 February 2011.

== Career statistics ==
=== Club ===
Appearances and goals by club, season and competition
Club	Season	League			National cup (Note: Includes Cupa României, FA Cup)		Continental		Other		Total	
Club	Season	Division	Apps	Goals	Apps	Goals	Apps	Goals	Apps	Goals	Apps	Goals
Someșul Satu Mare	2004–05	Divizia C					—		—			
Someșul Satu Mare	2005–06	Divizia C					—		—			
Someșul Satu Mare	Total						0	0	0	0		
Concordia Chiajna	2006–07	Liga III					—		—			
Concordia Chiajna	2007–08	Liga II	0	0	0	0	—		—		0	0
Concordia Chiajna	2008–09	Liga II	22	0	0	0	—		—		22	0
Concordia Chiajna	2009–10	Liga II	29	1	0	0	—		—		29	1
Concordia Chiajna	Total		51	1	0	0	—		—		51	1
Steaua București	2010–11	Liga I	23	0	5	0	5 (Note: Appearances in UEFA Europa League)	1	—		33	1
Steaua București	2011–12	Liga I	8	0	0	0	3	0	1 (Note: Appearance in Supercupa României)	0	12	0
Steaua București	2012–13	Liga I	21	1	2	0	10	0	—		33	1
Steaua București	2013–14	Liga I	29	2	4	0	11 (Note: Appearances in UEFA Champions League)	0	0	0	44	2
Steaua București	Total		81	3	11	0	29	1	1	0	122	4
Southampton	2014–15	Premier League	11	0	3	0	—		3 (Note: Appearances in EFL Cup)	0	17	0
Southampton	2015–16	Premier League	0	0	0	0	0	0	0	0	0	0
Southampton	2016–17	Premier League	0	0	1	0	0	0	0	0	1	0
Southampton	2017–18	Premier League	0	0	0	0	—		0	0	0	0
Southampton	Total		11	0	4	0	0	0	3	0	18	0
Universitatea Craiova (loan)	2017–18	Liga I	3	0	1	0	—		—		4	0
Universitatea Craiova	2018–19	Liga I	4	0	1	1	0	0	1	0	6	1
Universitatea Craiova	2019–20	Liga I	0	0	0	0	1	0	—		1	0
Universitatea Craiova	Total		4	0	1	1	1	0	1	0	7	1
Politehnica Iași (loan)	2018–19	Liga I	14	1	—		—		—		14	1
Academica Clinceni	2020–21	Liga I	26	0	1	0	—		—		27	0
Academica Clinceni	2021–22	Liga I	8	0	0	0	—		—		8	0
Academica Clinceni	Total		34	0	1	0	—		—		35	0
Sparta Râmnicu Vâlcea	2022–23	Liga IV	3	0	—		—		—		3	0
Career total			201	5	18	0	30	1	5	0	254	6

=== International ===
Appearances and goals by national team and year
National team	Year	Apps	Goals
Romania	2011	5	0
Romania	2012	3	0
Romania	2013	3	0
Romania	2014	3	0
Total		14	0

== Honours ==
Concordia Chiajna

- Liga III: 2006–07

Steaua București

- Liga I: 2012–13, 2013–14
- Cupa României: 2011
- Supercupa României: 2013

Southampton

- EFL Cup runner-up: 2016–17

Universitatea Craiova

- Cupa României: 2017–18
- Supercupa României runner-up: 2018
