= Leandro Tatu =

Brazilian footballer

Personal information
- Full name: Leandro Ângelo Martins
- Date of birth: 26 April 1982 (age 44)
- Place of birth: Vitória, Brazil
- Height: 1.73 m (5 ft 8 in)
- Position: Forward

Youth career
- 2002: Esporte Clube Noroeste
- 2003–2004: Estrela do Norte FC
- 2004: SC Internacional

Senior career*
| Years | Team | Apps | (Gls) |
| 2004–2005 | Naval | 29 | (10) |
| 2005–2007 | Leixões | 18 | (3) |
| 2007–2008 | Aves | 22 | (11) |
| 2008–2009 | Paços Ferreira | 21 | (1) |
| 2009–2010 | Santa Clara | 29 | (14) |
| 2010–2011 | Beira-Mar | 27 | (9) |
| 2011–2013 | Steaua București | 44 | (6) |
| 2013–2014 | ACS Poli Timisoara | 18 | (2) |
| 2014–2016 | Bangkok United | 84 | (18) |
| 2016–2018 | PTT Rayong | 45 | (7) |
| 2018 | Marinhense | 4 | (0) |
| 2018–2020 | CSM Lugoj | 43 | (6) |
| 2020 | Marinhense | 8 | (1) |
| 2021 | Phoenix Buziaş | 16 | (5) |
| 2022 | CS Diniaş | 11 | (2) |
| Total | | 419 | (95) |
- * Club domestic league appearances and goals as of 18 December 2023 (UTC)

Leandro Ângelo Martins (born April 26, 1982), known as Leandro Tatu, is a Brazilian striker.

== Club career ==
=== Steaua București ===
==== 2011-12 season ====
Tatu started the season well, scoring the opening goal in the 36th minute against Voința. The match ended 1-1. He then scored a goal against Mioveni in a 4–0 win. He made a string of 90 minute appearances before playing no Liga I games in November only one game in December. He resumed his starting appearance in March. His next goal did not come until April 2012, where he scored against Oțelul. He made 28 appearances for Steaua overall in the season in the domestic league. He helped the team to a 3rd-place finish in the Liga I which meant they qualified for the Europa League, although they were eliminated in the 7th round of the Cupa României.

==== 2012-13 season ====
In September 2012 his contract with Steaua was terminated, as the team did not want to pay his high salary.

==== Return to Steaua ====
After he ended his contract with Steaua in September 2012, Tatu returned to Steaua București 4 months later, in January 2013. At the end of the first part of the 2013–14 season, Tatu was released from Steaua again.

== Honours ==
Paços de Ferreira

- Taça de Portugal runner-up: 2008–09

Steaua București

- Liga I: 2012–13
- Romanian Supercup: 2013

Bangkok United

- Thai First League runner-up: 2015–16

PTT Rayong

- Thai Second League: 2017–18
