= Ionuț Năstăsie =

Romanian footballer

Personal information
- Full name: Ionuț Eugen Năstăsie
- Date of birth: 7 January 1992 (age 34)
- Place of birth: Ișalnița, Romania
- Height: 1.79 m (5 ft 10 in)
- Position: Midfielder

Team information
- Current team: CSM Slatina
- Number: 7

Youth career
- 2000–2007: Școala de Fotbal Gheorghe Popescu
- 2007–2009: Steaua București

Senior career*
Years	Team	Apps	(Gls)
2009–2011	Steaua II București	42	(3)
2011–2013	Steaua București	6	(0)
2012	→ Universitatea Cluj (loan)	10	(0)
2013–2014	Viitorul Constanța	16	(0)
2016–2021	Argeș Pitești	104	(20)
2021–2023	Hermannstadt	39	(3)
2023–2024	1599 Șelimbăr	21	(5)
2024–	CSM Slatina	65	(8)

International career
2009	Romania U17	5	(0)
2010–2011	Romania U19	5	(0)
2011–2013	Romania U21	4	(0)
- * Club domestic league appearances and goals as of 1 November 2026

Ionuț Eugen Năstăsie (born 7 January 1992) is a Romanian professional footballer who plays as a midfielder for Liga II club CSM Slatina, which he captains.

== Club career ==
=== Steaua București ===
He made his first team debut on 22 September 2011 against Sănătatea Cluj, coming on as a substitute.

=== Viitorul Constanța ===
In July 2013, he was transferred to Viitorul Constanța. He was released from Viitorul in September 2014.

== International career ==
He played for Romania U-19 in the UEFA European Under-19 Football Championship group stage.

== Honours ==
Steaua București

- Liga I: 2012–13
- Supercupa României: 2013

SCM Pitești

- Liga III: 2016–17
