= Stefan Nikolić (footballer, born 1990) =

Montenegrin footballer

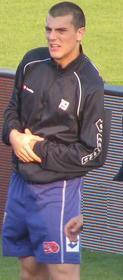
- Nikolić training with Poli Timișoara

Personal information
- Date of birth: 16 April 1990 (age 36)
- Place of birth: Nikšić, SFR Yugoslavia
- Height: 1.93 m (6 ft 4 in)
- Position: Striker

Team information
- Current team: SCM Zalău
- Number: 9

Youth career
- 1998–2004: Sutjeska Nikšić
- 2004–2005: Partizan
- 2005–2007: OFK Beograd

Senior career*
Years	Team	Apps	(Gls)
2007–2008	OFK Beograd	3	(0)
2008–2010	Lierse	23	(4)
2009–2010	→ Roeselare (loan)	24	(2)
2010–2012	Politehnica Timișoara	18	(3)
2011–2012	→ Steaua București (loan)	20	(5)
2012–2014	Steaua București	28	(9)
2014	Incheon United	7	(0)
2015	CSKA Sofia	10	(0)
2015–2016	Istra 1961	18	(5)
2016	Bruk-Bet Nieciecza	3	(0)
2016–2017	Radnik Surdulica	11	(3)
2017	Kaisar	13	(1)
2017	Sepsi OSK	13	(0)
2018	Napredak Kruševac	7	(1)
2018	Partizani	0	(0)
2018–2019	Radnik Surdulica	16	(0)
2019–2020	Sutjeska Nikšić	25	(8)
2020–2021	Krupa	15	(4)
2021	Melaka United	7	(4)
2021	San Luca	6	(1)
2021	Bisceglie	1	(0)
2022	Dukagjini	12	(1)
2022	Rudar Pljevlja	15	(3)
2023–	SCM Zalău	23	(17)

International career
2008–2009	Montenegro U19	6	(0)
2009–2011	Montenegro U21	12	(5)
- * Club domestic league appearances and goals as of 14:14, 30 October 2024 (UTC)

Stefan Nikolić (Montenegrin: Стефан Николић, born 16 April 1990) is a Montenegrin professional footballer who plays as a striker for Romanian club SCM Zalău.

== Club career ==
=== Youth career ===
Born in Nikšić, Nikolić began his youth career with local club Sutjeska. Later, he joined the Serbian club Partizan for one year. In 2005, Nikolić signed with OFK Beograd and after two years he was promoted to the first team.

=== OFK Beograd ===
Nikolić made his professional debut in Serbia for OFK Beograd where he made just three appearances in the Serbian SuperLiga.

=== Lierse ===
On 16 May 2008, he signed with Belgian side Lierse making 23 appearances for the Belgian team, scoring 4 goals. In the 2009–10 season, he was sent on loan to Roeselare, where he played 20 matches and even scored two goals.

=== Politehnica Timișoara ===
On 7 September 2010, Nikolić signed with Politehnica Timișoara for an undisclosed fee. He signed a five-year contract. He made his Liga I debut on 2 October 2010, in a 2–1 win against Rapid Bucharest. On 21 November 2010, Nikolić scored his first goal for Poli in 2–0 win against Oţelul Galaţi. He finished the 2010–11 season with 18 appearances and three goals.

=== Steaua București ===
On 25 July 2011, Nikolić signed with Romanian record champion Steaua București for an initial fee of €250,000 and a buy-out clause of €750,000 for the rest of the players rights which was activated in the summer of 2012. He scored his first goal for Steaua against Oțelul Galați. On 14 December 2011, he scored 2 goals against AEK Larnaca in the Europa League.

At the end of 2013, Nikolić was released by Steaua București.

=== Incheon United ===
In January 2014, Nikolić received an offer to join the K League Classic team Incheon United in South Korea.

=== CSKA Sofia ===
On 13 January 2015, Nikolić signed a one-and-a-half-year contract with Bulgarian A Football Group side CSKA Sofia.

=== Italy ===
On 4 November 2021, he signed with Bisceglie in the Italian fourth-tier Serie D after starting the 2021–22 season with San Luca in the same league.

== International career ==
He was part of the Montenegro national under-19 football team and the Montenegro national under-21 football team.

In September 2012, Nikolić was called up to the Montenegrin senior side for two matches against Poland and San Marino, but failed to make the final squad.

== Career statistics ==
Appearances and goals by club, season and competition
Club	Season	League			National cup (Note: Includes Belgian Cup, Cupa României)		Continental		Total	
Club	Season	Division	Apps	Goals	Apps	Goals	Apps	Goals	Apps	Goals
OFK Beograd	2007–08	Serbian SuperLiga	3	0	0	0	0	0	3	0
Lierse	2008–09	Belgian Second Division	23	4	0	0	0	0	23	4
Roeselare (loan)	2009–10	Belgian Pro League	20	2	3	0	0	0	23	2
Politehnica Timișoara	2010–11	Liga I	18	3	3	0	0	0	21	3
Steaua București	2011–12	Liga I	20	2	2	1	9 (Note: Appearances in UEFA Europa League)	2	31	5
Steaua București	2012–13	Liga I	24	5	2	1	9	1	35	7
Steaua București	2013–14	Liga I	4	0	1	1	3 (Note: Appearances in UEFA Champions League)	0	8	1
Steaua București	Total		48	7	5	3	21	3	74	13
Incheon United	2014	K League 1	7	0	0	0	0	0	7	0
CSKA Sofia	2014–15	A PFG	10	0	0	0	0	0	10	0
Career total			128	16	11	3	21	3	161	22

== Honours ==
Steaua București

- Liga I: 2012–13, 2013–14
- Supercupa României: 2013
