= Valeriu Lupu =

Romanian footballer (born 1991)

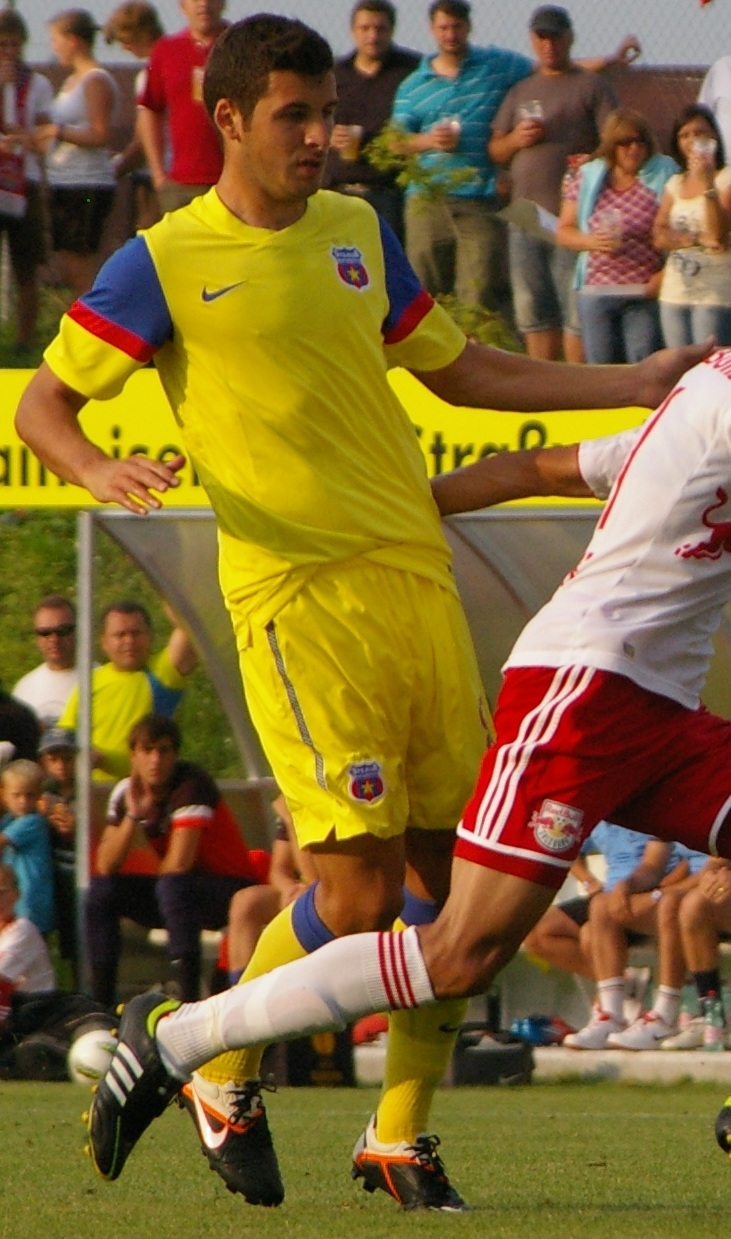

Personal information
- Full name: Valeriu Ștefan Lupu
- Date of birth: 24 January 1991 (age 35)
- Place of birth: Bolintin-Vale, Romania
- Height: 1.83 m (6 ft 0 in)
- Position: Left-back

Youth career
- 2001–2007: FCSB

Senior career*
Years	Team	Apps	(Gls)
2007–2010	FCSB II	10	(1)
2010–2016	FCSB	4	(0)
2010–2011	→ Unirea Urziceni (loan)	17	(0)
2012–2013	→ Universitatea Cluj (loan)	9	(0)
2013–2014	→ Săgeata Năvodari (loan)	10	(1)
2016	Berceni	13	(0)
2017	Metalul Reșița	10	(1)
2017–2023	Bolintin	51	(5)
Total		114	(8)

International career
2011–2012	Romania U21	4	(0)
- * Club domestic league appearances and goals

Valeriu Lupu (born 24 January 1991) is a Romanian former professional footballer who played as a left-back.

== Career ==
Born in Bolintin-Vale, Lupu played for the FCSB youth teams and started his senior career with FCSB II, before being loaned to Unirea Urziceni. He made his Liga I debut on 11 September 2010 in a match against FCSB. Lupu went on to play for the FCSB first team, but was later loaned to Universitatea Cluj and Săgeata Năvodari.

== Career statistics ==
Appearances and goals by club, season and competition
Club	Season	League		National cup		League cup		Continental		Other		Total	
Club	Season	Apps	Goals	Apps	Goals	Apps	Goals	Apps	Goals	Apps	Goals	Apps	Goals
FCSB II	2007–08					–		–		–			
FCSB II	2008–09					–		–		–			
FCSB II	2009–10					–		–		–			
FCSB II	2010–11	2	0	0	0	–		–		–		2	0
FCSB II	Total	10	1	0	0	ß	ß	ß	ß	ß	ß	10	1
Unirea Urziceni (loan)	2010–11	17	0	1	0	–		–		–		18	0
FCSB	2011–12	2	0	1	0	–		0	0	0	0	3	0
FCSB	2012–13	2	0	0	0	–		0	0	–		2	0
FCSB	Total	4	0	1	0	ß	ß	0	0	0	0	5	0
Universitatea Cluj (loan)	2012–13	9	0	0	0	–		–		–		9	0
Săgeata Năvodari (loan)	2013–14	10	1	0	0	–		–		–		10	1
Career total		50	2	2	0	ß	ß	0	0	0	0	52	2

== Honours ==
FCSB

- Liga I: 2012–13
- Supercupa României: 2013
