= Drăgășani =

- Municipality
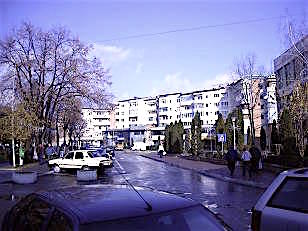

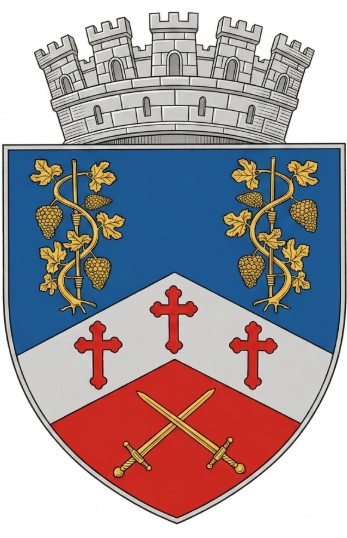
- Coat of arms

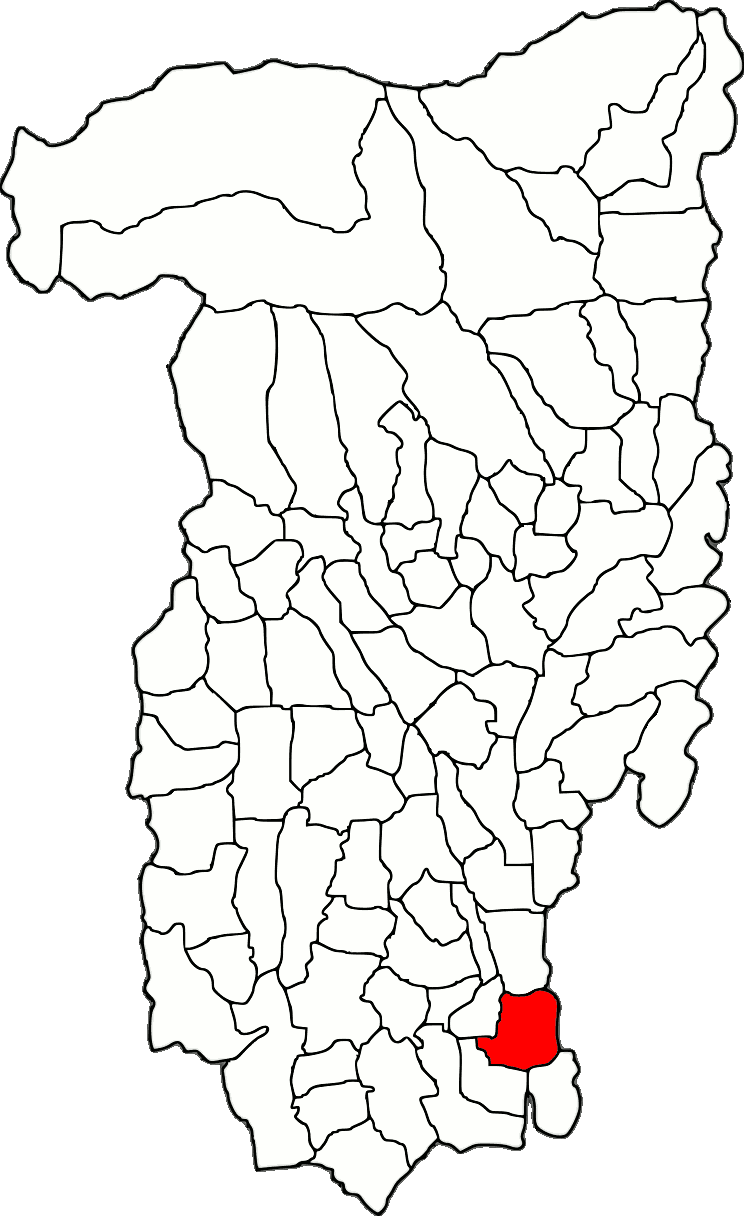
- Location in Vâlcea County

- Location in Romania
- Coordinates: 44°39′40″N 24°15′38″E
- Country: Romania
- County: Vâlcea

Government
  - Mayor (2024–2028): Costinel Stoica (PNL)
- Area: 44.57 km^{2} (17.21 sq mi)
- Population (2021-12-01): 15,617
  - Density: 350.4/km^{2} (907.5/sq mi)
- Time zone: UTC+02:00 (EET)
  - Summer (DST): UTC+03:00 (EEST)
- Postal code: 245700
- Area code: (+40) 02 50
- Vehicle reg.: VL
- Website: www.primariadragasani.ro

Drăgășani (Romanian pronunciation: [drəɡəˈʃanʲ]) is a city in Vâlcea County, Romania, near the right bank of the Olt river, and on the railway between Caracal and Râmnicu Vâlcea. The city is well known for the vineyards on the neighboring hills that produce some of the best Wallachian wines.

The city administers four villages: Capu Dealului, Valea Caselor, Zărneni, and Zlătărei. It is situated in the historical region of Oltenia.

== History ==
Historical population
Year	Pop.	±%
1900	4,398	—
1912	6,710	+52.6%
1930	7,002	+4.4%
1948	9,737	+39.1%
1956	9,963	+2.3%
1966	11,589	+16.3%
1977	15,647	+35.0%
1992	22,126	+41.4%
2002	22,499	+1.7%
2011	17,871	−20.6%
2021	15,617	−12.6%
Source: Census data

Drăgășani stands on the site of the Dacian town Rusidava. On 19 June 1821, during the Greek War of Independence, the Ottomans routed the Filiki Eteria troops of Alexander Ypsilantis near the city in the Battle of Dragashani. There Tudor Vladimirescu fought with his Panduri, revolutionary fighters consisting mainly of peasants and not armed with firepower, against the Turks.

== Notable people ==
- Florin Costea (born 1985), footballer
- Mihai Costea (born 1988), footballer
- Alexandru Dandea (born 1988), footballer
- Mugur Isărescu (born 1949), economist, served as Prime Minister and governor of the National Bank of Romania
- Gib Mihăescu (1894–1935), prose writer and playwright
- Cosmin Năstăsie (born 1983), footballer
- Alexandru Neacșa (born 1991), footballer
- Adrian Păun (born 1995), footballer
- Ion Voicu (born 1975), footballer

== Notes ==
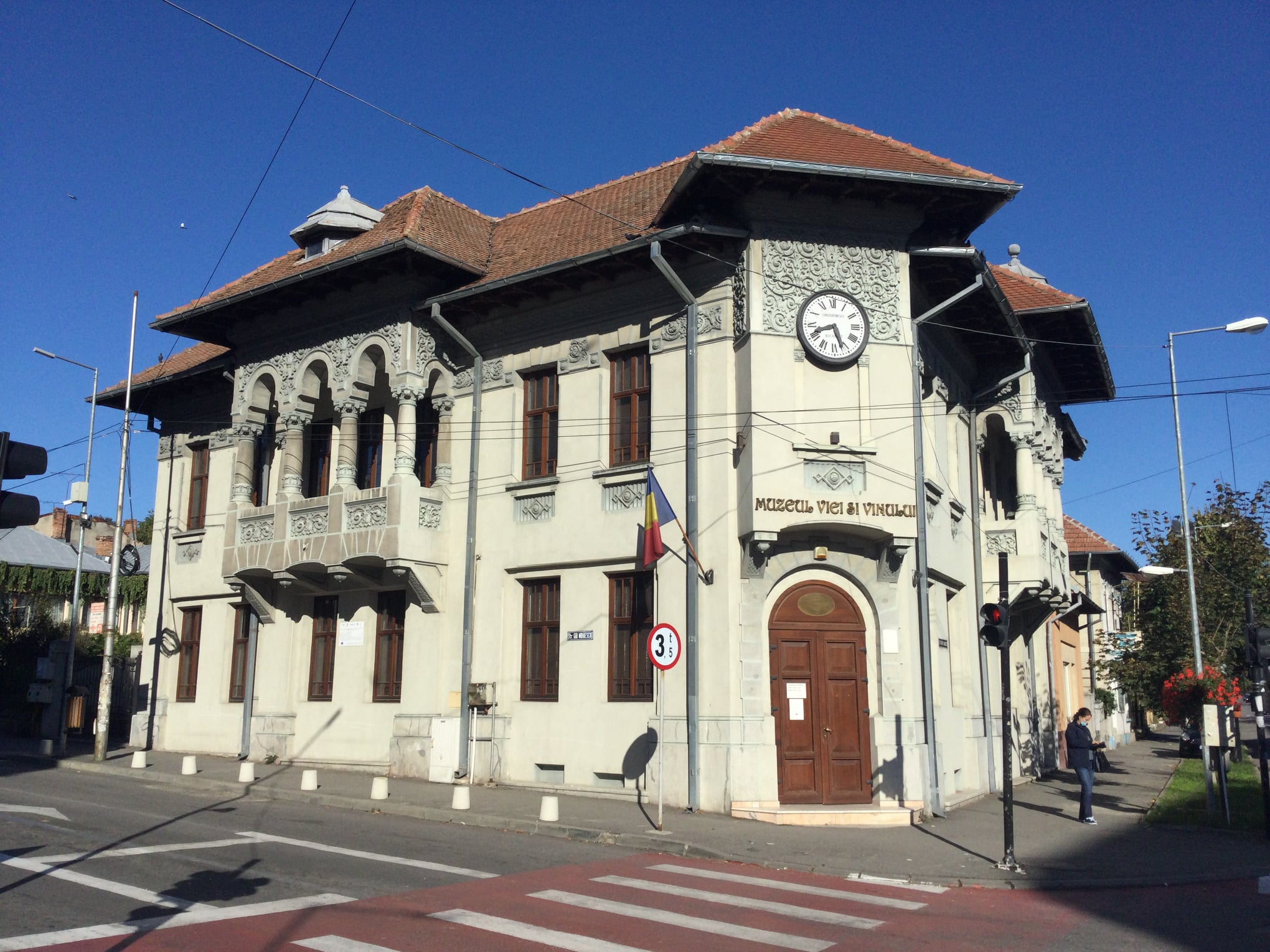
Wine Museum

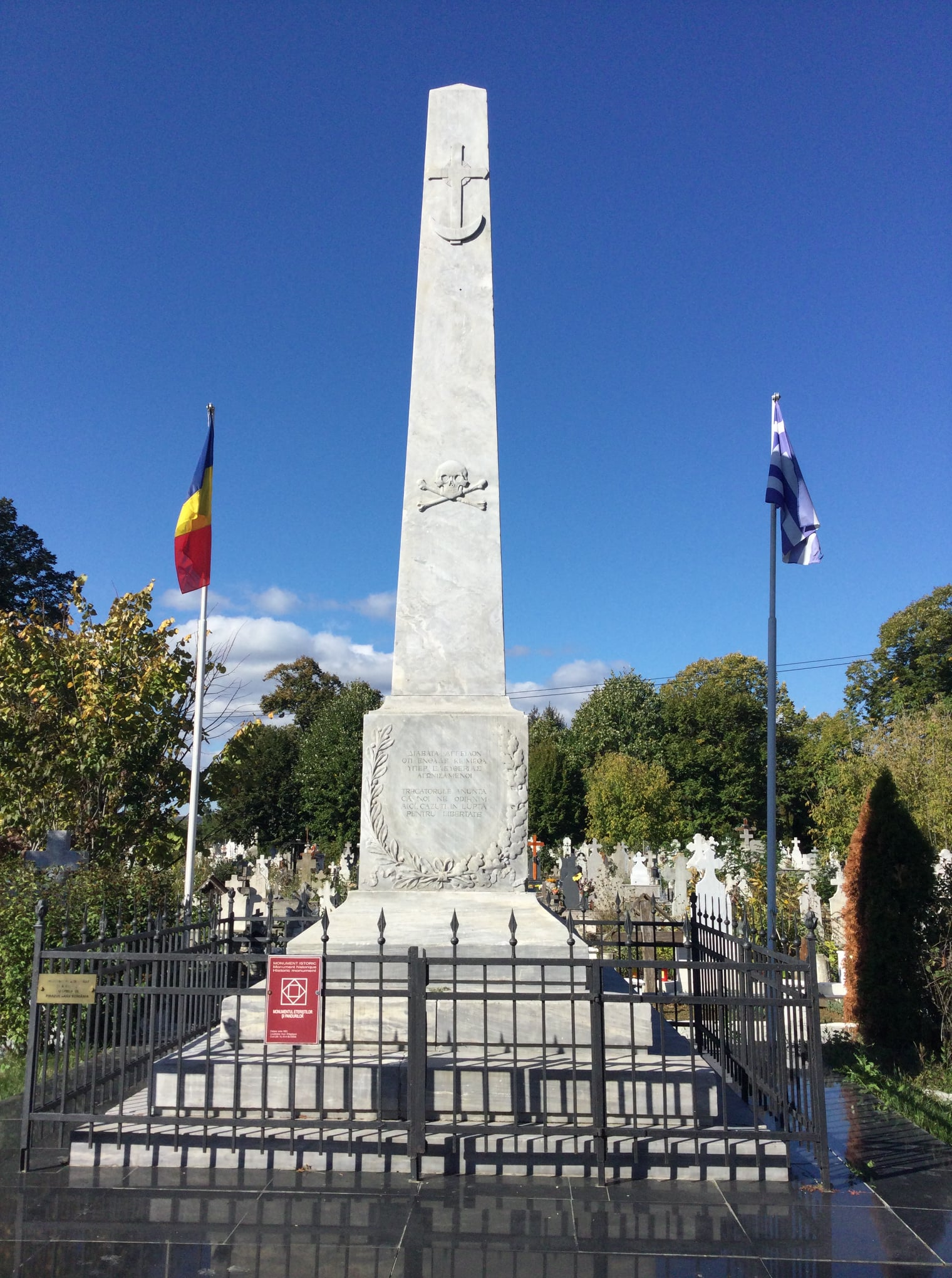
Filiki Eteria monument
