= Gabriel Machado =

Brazilian footballer (born 1989)

Personal information
- Full name: Gabriel Teixeira Machado
- Date of birth: 2 September 1989 (age 37)
- Place of birth: Porto Alegre, Brazil
- Height: 1.84 m (6 ft 0 in)
- Position: Forward

Team information
- Current team: FC Regensdorf

Youth career
- 1998–2003: Internacional
- 2003–2006: Juventude

Senior career*
Years	Team	Apps	(Gls)
2007	Juventude	7	(3)
2008	Grasshopper	19	(1)
2009	Stade Nyonnais	10	(4)
2009–2011	Universitatea Cluj	61	(16)
2012	Steaua București	3	(0)
2013	Rayo Vallecano	0	(0)
2013	→ Hércules (loan)	0	(0)
2013	Syrianska	3	(0)
2014	Universitatea Cluj	13	(0)
2015	FC United Zürich	11	(5)
2015–2017	FC Wettswil-Bonstetten	42	(14)
2018	FC Glattbrugg		
2018–	FC Regensdorf		
- * Club domestic league appearances and goals as of 30 March 2019

Gabriel Teixeira Machado (born 2 September 1989) is a Brazilian footballer who plays as a forward for FC Regensdorf.

== Career ==
=== Juventude ===
Machado started his career at Juventude, signed a 3-year contract in December 2005. He made his debut in Campeonato Brasileiro Série A 2007.

=== Grasshopper ===
In January 2008, at age of 18, he signed a contract until June 2009 with Grasshopper.

=== Nyon ===
In January 2009, he joined Nyon of Swiss Challenge League.

=== Universitatea Cluj ===
In August 2009, he joined Universitatea Cluj. In his first year with the team he scored 9 goals and helped U Cluj to promote to the Liga I. This also made him team top scorer. On 9 February 2011, Machado signed a new three-year contract, holding him at the Romanian side until the Summer of 2014.

=== Steaua București ===
In January 2012, he joined Steaua București of Liga I.

=== Syrianska FC ===
In August 2013, he joined Syrianska FC of 2013 Allsvenskan.

=== Universitatea Cluj ===
In January 2014, he returned to Universitatea Cluj of Liga I but six months later the club announced that the player has been dismissed.

== Career statistics ==
(Correct as of 22 November 2011)

Club	Season	League		Cup		Europe		Total	
Club	Season	Apps	Goals	Apps	Goals	Apps	Goals	Apps	Goals
Juventude
Juventude	2007–08	7	3	?	?	0	0	7	3
Total		7	3	?	?	0	0	7	3
Grasshopper
Grasshopper	2007–08	13	1	1	0	0	0	14	1
Grasshopper	2008–09	6	0	1	0	0	0	7	0
Total		19	1	2	0	0	0	21	1
Nyon
Nyon	2008–09	10	4	0	0	0	0	10	4
Total		10	4	0	0	0	0	10	4
Universitatea Cluj
Universitatea Cluj	2009–10	24	9	0	0	0	0	24	9
Universitatea Cluj	2010–11	25	6	1	0	0	0	25	6
Universitatea Cluj	2011–12	12	1	0	0	0	0	12	1
Total		61	16	1	0	0	0	62	16
Steaua București
Steaua București	2011–12	3	0	0	0	0	0	3	0
Steaua București	2012–13	0	0	1	0	0	0	1	0
Total		3	0	1	0	0	0	4	0
Career total		99	24	4	0	0	0	103	24
