= Tiberiu Bălan =

Romanian footballer

Personal information
- Full name: Tiberiu Gabriel Bălan
- Date of birth: 17 February 1981 (age 45)
- Place of birth: Ocna Mureș, SR Romania
- Height: 1.76 m (5 ft 9 in)
- Position: Attacking midfielder

Team information
- Current team: CSO Băicoi (manager)

Youth career
- 1993–1997: Universitatea Cluj

Senior career*
Years	Team	Apps	(Gls)
1997–2000	Universitatea Cluj	30	(0)
2000	Rapid București	12	(1)
2001	Gaz Metan Mediaș	2	(0)
2001–2002	Electromagnetica București	12	(5)
2002–2011	Sportul Studențesc	151	(42)
2008	→ Politehnica Timișoara (loan)	6	(0)
2008–2009	→ Unirea Urziceni (loan)	33	(4)
2010	→ Rapid București (loan)	1	(0)
2011–2012	FCSB	21	(2)
2013–2014	Rapid București	5	(1)
2014–2015	Voluntari	17	(5)
2015	Farul Constanța	9	(0)
Total		299	(60)

International career^{‡}
1998–1999	Romania U18	2	(2)
2005–2011	Romania	7	(0)

Managerial career
- 2018: Voluntari II
- 2019: Pandurii Târgu Jiu
- 2020–2021: Axiopolis Cernavodă
- 2022–2023: Minerul Ocna Dej
- 2024-2025: Universitatea Cluj U-19
- 2026-: CSO Băicoi
- * Club domestic league appearances and goals as of 21:05, 13 January 2024 (UTC) ‡ National team caps and goals as of 10 August 2011

Tiberiu Gabriel Bălan (born 17 February 1981) is a Romanian former international footballer who played as an attacking midfielder and currently a football manager. And currently coaches CSO Băicoi.

== Honours ==
Season	Club	Title
2008–09	Unirea Urziceni	Liga I
2012–13	FCSB	Liga I
