= Bogdan Mustață =

Romanian footballer

Personal information
- Date of birth: 28 July 1990 (age 36)
- Place of birth: Bucharest, Romania
- Height: 1.87 m (6 ft 1 1/2 in)
- Position: Right back

Youth career
- 2000–2008: Steaua București

Senior career*
Years	Team	Apps	(Gls)
2008–2011	Steaua II București	42	(0)
2010–2011	→ Unirea Urziceni (loan)	4	(0)
2011	Steaua București	0	(0)
2012	Turnu Severin	0	(0)

International career^{‡}
2011	Romania U-21	4	(0)
- * Club domestic league appearances and goals as of 22 May 2011 ‡ National team caps and goals as of 22 May 2011

Bogdan Mustață (born 28 July 1990) is a Romanian footballer who plays as a right back. He played in Liga I for Unirea Urziceni.

== Club statistics ==
Club	Season	League		Cup		Europe		Other		Total	
Club	Season	Apps	Goals	Apps	Goals	Apps	Goals	Apps	Goals	Apps	Goals
Steaua București
Steaua București	2011–12	0	0	1	0	1	0	0	0	2	0
Total		0	0	1	0	1	0	0	0	2	0
Career total		0	0	1	0	1	0	0	0	2	0

Statistics accurate as of match played 20 October 2011
