= Mihai Costea =

Romanian footballer

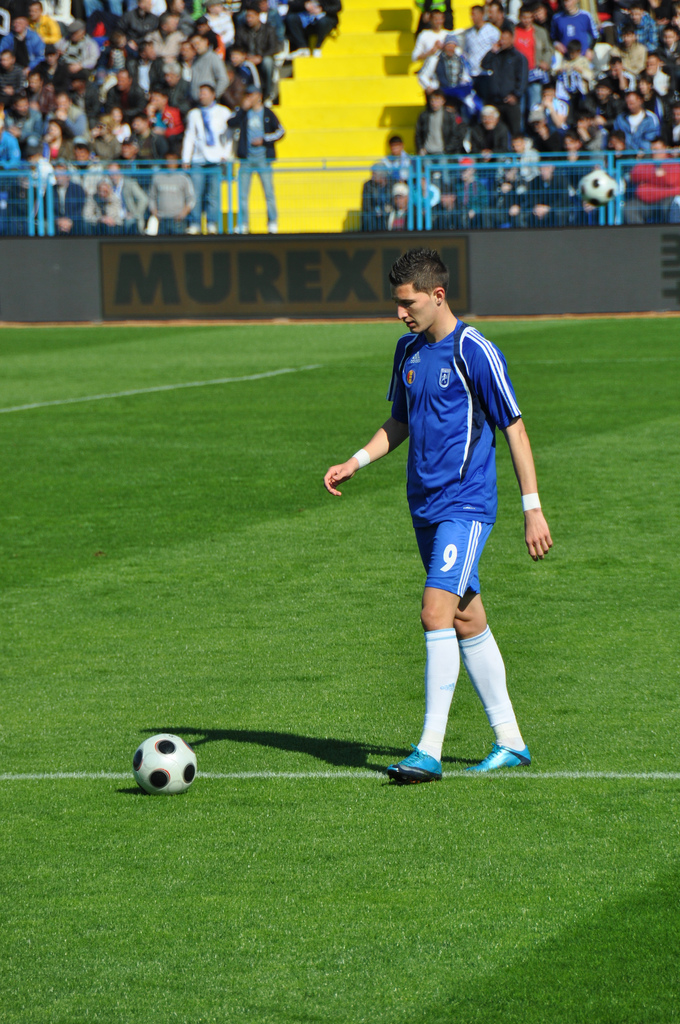

Personal information
- Full name: Mihai Alexandru Costea
- Date of birth: 29 May 1988 (age 38)
- Place of birth: Drăgășani, Romania
- Height: 1.79 m (5 ft 10 in)
- Position: Forward

Team information
- Current team: Sparta Râmnicu Vâlcea
- Number: 25

Youth career
- –2005: CSM Râmnicu Vâlcea
- 2006–2007: Universitatea Craiova

Senior career*
Years	Team	Apps	(Gls)
2006–2011	Universitatea Craiova	83	(14)
2011–2015	Steaua București	35	(9)
2015–2016	Voluntari	7	(0)
2016	Ittihad Kalba	14	(17)
2017–2018	Al-Fujairah	14	(5)
2018–2019	Al-Arabi	11	(10)
2020–2021	Chindia Târgoviște	13	(0)
2022	Progresul 05 București		
2022–2023	ARO Câmpulung	14	(16)
2023	Viitorul Dăești	11	(10)
2023–2024	Mioveni	19	(1)
2024–2025	Râmnicu Vâlcea	0	(0)
2025–	Viitorul Budești		
Total		221	(82)

International career
2009–2010	Romania U21	13	(1)
- * Club domestic league appearances and goals as of 15:15, 8 December 2024 (UTC)

Mihai Alexandru Costea (born 29 May 1988) is a Romanian professional footballer who plays as a forward for Sparta Râmnicu Vâlcea. He is the younger brother of Florin Costea.

== Club career ==
=== FC U Craiova ===
Costea played in Universitatea Craiova youth team. In 2008 the player was promoted to the first team, where he joined his older brother Florin Costea. Though his favorite positions are forward or winger, due to lack of players at Universitatea Craiova he was often used as a left midfielder. This usually brought criticism to Universitatea Craiova officials.

=== Steaua București ===
Costea was transferred to Steaua București for a reported transfer fee of €1.4 million.

In July 2013, Costea was excluded from the team, after refusing to comply with the team schedule, being unhappy that he wasn't called for game against Vardar Skopje, in the Champions League qualifying stage.

=== Gulf ===
In 2016, it was announced that United Arab Emirates's Al-Ittihad Kalba signed Romanian free-agent Mihai Costea. Costea concluded his debut season as the club's top scorer with 17 goals in addition to ten league assists in only eleven games played.

== International career ==
Costea was a Romania U-21 international being capped thirteen times and scored one goal against Latvia U-21 on 14 November 2009.

== Honours ==
Universitatea Craiova

- Divizia B: 2005–06

Steaua București

- Liga I: 2012–13, 2013–14
- Cupa României runner-up: 2013–14
- Supercupa României: 2013
