= Bolintin-Vale =

- Town
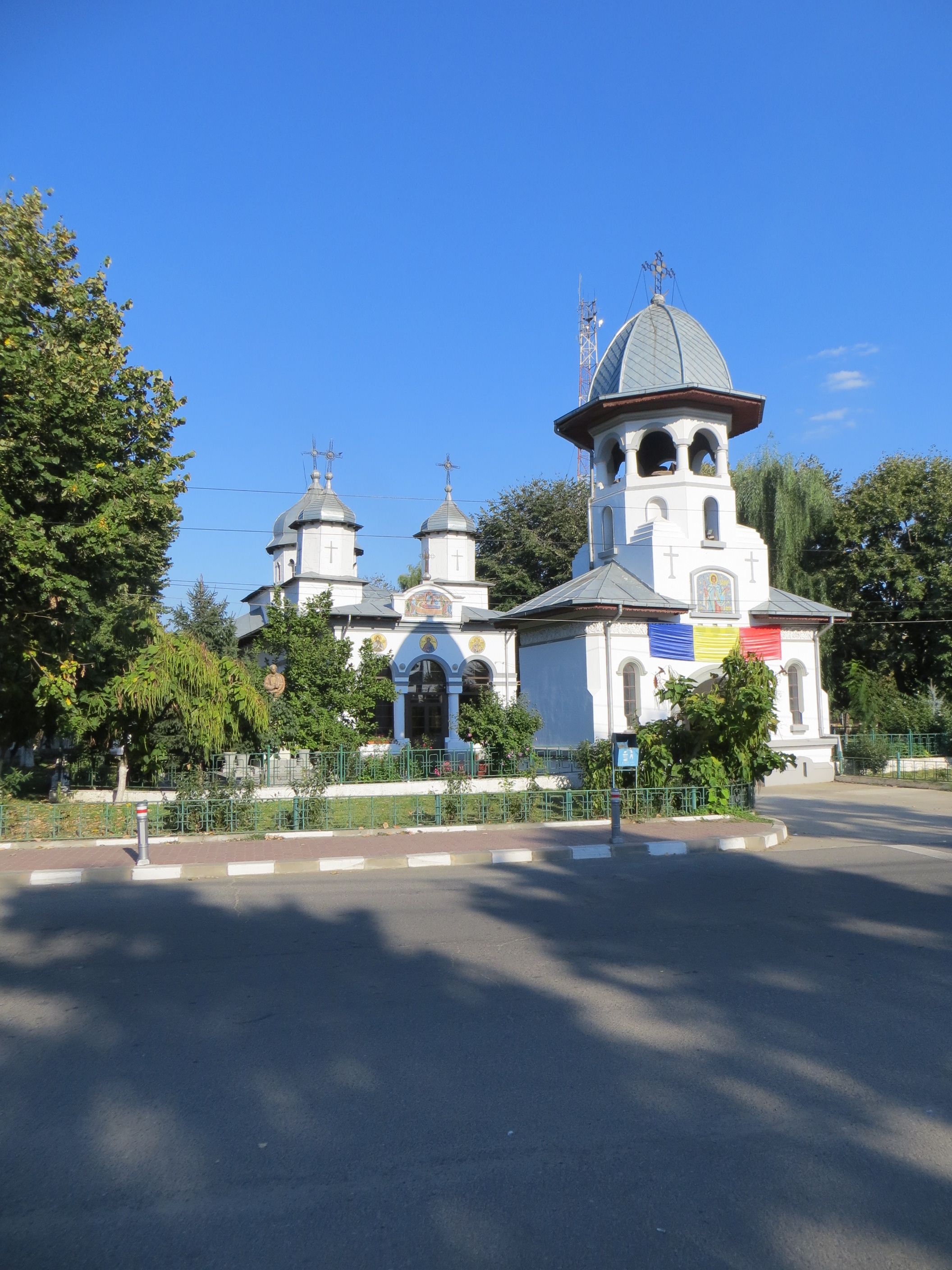
- Assumption church in Bolintin-Vale

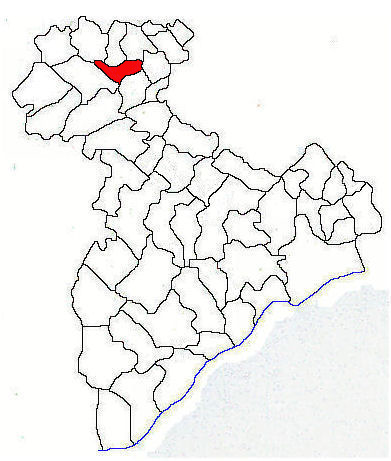
- Location in Giurgiu County

- Location in Romania
- Coordinates: 44°26′50″N 25°45′26″E
- Country: Romania
- County: Giurgiu

Government
  - Mayor (2024–2028): Daniel Trăistaru (PNL)
- Area: 43.42 km^{2} (16.76 sq mi)
- Elevation: 100 m (330 ft)
- Population (2021-12-01): 12,806
  - Density: 294.9/km^{2} (763.9/sq mi)
- Time zone: UTC+02:00 (EET)
  - Summer (DST): UTC+03:00 (EEST)
- Postal code: 085100
- Area code: (+40) 02 46
- Vehicle reg.: GR
- Website: www.bolintin-vale.ro

Bolintin-Vale (Romanian pronunciation: [bolinˌtin ˈvale]) is a town in Giurgiu County, Muntenia, Romania with a population of 12,806 as of 2021. The town administers three villages: Crivina, Malu Spart, and Suseni. It is the second largest city in the county; proximity to the capital, Bucharest, has helped the local economy. It officially became a town in 1989, as a result of the Romanian rural systematization program.

The town is situated in the Wallachian Plain, at an altitude of 100 m (330 ft), on the banks of the Sabar River.

== Demographics ==
Historical population
Year	Pop.	±%
1992	11,545	—
2002	11,702	+1.4%
2011	12,929	+10.5%
2021	12,806	−1.0%
Source: Census data

According to the 2011 census, Bolintin-Vale was mainly populated by ethnic Romanians, who made up 79.2% of the total population of 12,929, even though it had a significant Romani minority (19.8%). In fact, Bolintin-Vale was at time the Romanian town with the fourth largest percentage of Roma people. Many of the Romani are refugees from neighbouring Bolintin-Deal, who settled here after the ethnic clashes from 1991. As of 2011, the population breakdown of the town and the three adjacent villages was as follows: Bolintin-Vale 7,376, Malu Spart 3,126, Crivina 817, and Suseni 508.

At the 2021 census, the town had a population of 12,806, of which 73,2% were Romanians and 14.63% Roma.

== Natives ==
- Dimitrie Bolintineanu (1819 or 1825 – 1872), poet, diplomat, and politician
- Valeriu Lupu (born 1991), footballer
- Florentin Matei (born 1993), footballer

== See also ==
- List of towns in Romania by Romani population
