= Novak Martinović =

Serbian footballer

Personal information
- Full name: Novak Martinović
- Date of birth: 31 January 1985 (age 41)
- Place of birth: Belgrade, SFR Yugoslavia
- Height: 1.88 m (6 ft 2 in)
- Position: Defender

Team information
- Current team: OFK Beograd

Youth career
- Partizan

Senior career*
| Years | Team | Apps | (Gls) |
| 2003–2004 | Rad | 2 | (0) |
| 2004–2007 | BSK Borča | 58 | (7) |
| 2007–2008 | OFK Beograd | 7 | (0) |
| 2008 | → Smederevo (loan) | 8 | (1) |
| 2009–2010 | Pandurii Târgu Jiu | 36 | (3) |
| 2010–2012 | Steaua București | 32 | (6) |
| 2010 | Steaua II București | 4 | (0) |
| 2013 | Wuhan Zall | 12 | (1) |
| 2013–2014 | Red Star Belgrade | 6 | (0) |
| 2017–2018 | OFK Beograd | 15 | (0) |
| Total | | 180 | (18) |
- * Club domestic league appearances and goals as of 21 January 2018

Novak Martinović (Serbian Cyrillic: Новак Мартиновић, pronounced [nôʋaːk martǐːnoʋitɕ]; born 31 January 1985) is a retired Serbian professional footballer.

== Career ==
In his homeland, Martinović played for Rad, BSK Borča, OFK Beograd, and Smederevo, before moving abroad to Romania in early 2009. He is arguably best remembered for kicking a Petrolul Ploiești fan who ran onto the field and punched his Steaua București teammate George Galamaz in the head during a Liga I game in October 2011. Despite receiving a red card by the referee, Martinović was later praised for his reaction by the media and the fans.

In early 2013, Martinović was transferred to Chinese club Wuhan Zall. He left Asia after just six months and returned to Serbia to join Red Star Belgrade.

== Career statistics ==
Appearances and goals by club, season and competition
| Club | Season | League | | | National cup | | Continental | | Other | | Total | |
| Club | Season | Division | Apps | Goals | Apps | Goals | Apps | Goals | Apps | Goals | Apps | Goals |
|---|---|---|---|---|---|---|---|---|---|---|---|---|
| OFK Beograd | 2007–08 | Serbian SuperLiga | 5 | 0 | 0 | 0 | — | | — | | 5 | 0 |
| OFK Beograd | 2008–09 | Serbian SuperLiga | 2 | 0 | 0 | 0 | — | | — | | 2 | 0 |
| OFK Beograd | Total | | 7 | 0 | 0 | 0 | — | | — | | 7 | 0 |
| Smederevo (loan) | 2007–08 | Serbian SuperLiga | 8 | 1 | 0 | 0 | — | | — | | 8 | 1 |
| Pandurii Târgu Jiu | 2008–09 | Liga I | 9 | 2 | 1 | 0 | — | | — | | 10 | 2 |
| Pandurii Târgu Jiu | 2009–10 | Liga I | 27 | 1 | 0 | 0 | — | | — | | 27 | 1 |
| Pandurii Târgu Jiu | Total | | 36 | 3 | 1 | 0 | — | | — | | 37 | 3 |
| Steaua București | 2010–11 | Liga I | 9 | 1 | 3 | 0 | 2 | 0 | — | | 14 | 1 |
| Steaua București | 2011–12 | Liga I | 18 | 4 | 1 | 1 | 8 | 0 | 1 | 0 | 28 | 5 |
| Steaua București | 2012–13 | Liga I | 5 | 1 | 2 | 0 | 3 | 1 | — | | 10 | 2 |
| Steaua București | Total | | 32 | 6 | 6 | 1 | 13 | 1 | 1 | 0 | 52 | 8 |
| Steaua II București | 2010–11 | Liga II | 4 | 0 | — | | — | | — | | 4 | 0 |
| Wuhan Zall | 2013 | Chinese Super League | 12 | 1 | 0 | 0 | — | | — | | 12 | 1 |
| Red Star Belgrade | 2013–14 | Serbian SuperLiga | 6 | 1 | 1 | 0 | 1 | 0 | — | | 8 | 1 |
| OFK Beograd | 2017–18 | Serbian League Belgrade | 15 | 0 | 0 | 0 | — | | — | | 15 | 0 |
| Career total | | | 120 | 12 | 8 | 1 | 14 | 1 | 1 | 0 | 143 | 14 |

== Honours ==
Steaua București

- Cupa României: 2010–11

Red Star Belgrade

- Serbian SuperLiga: 2013–14
