= Ovidiu Dănănae =

Romanian footballer

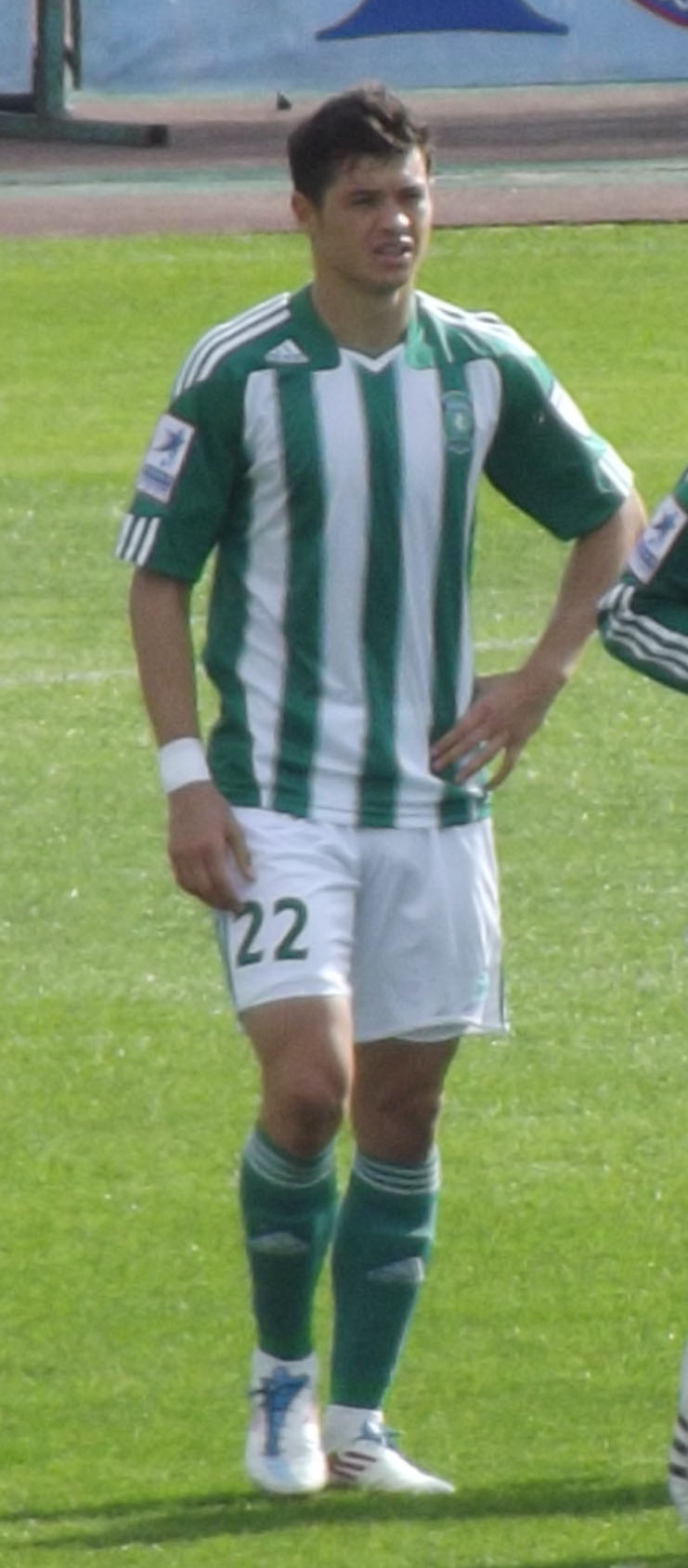
- Dănănae in the Russian Premier League

Personal information
- Full name: Ovidiu Liviu Dănănae
- Date of birth: 26 August 1985 (age 41)
- Place of birth: Craiova, Romania
- Height: 1.75 m (5 ft 9 in)
- Position: Right back

Team information
- Current team: Partizani Tirana (assistant)

Youth career
- –2003: Universitatea Craiova

Senior career*
Years	Team	Apps	(Gls)
2003–2011	FC Universitatea Craiova	165	(2)
2003–2004	→ CSM Reșița (loan)	21	(2)
2011	Tom Tomsk	4	(0)
2012	Steaua București	1	(0)
2013	CS Turnu Severin	13	(0)
2013–2014	Apollon Limassol	10	(0)
2014–2015	Universitatea Craiova	1	(0)
2016–2017	Metalul Reșița	24	(0)
2017–2020	FC U Craiova	57	(4)
Total		296	(8)

International career
2009–2010	Romania	4	(0)

Managerial career
- 2020–2021: FC U Craiova (assistant)
- 2021: Viitorul Târgu Jiu (assistant)
- 2021: FC U Craiova (assistant)
- 2022: Viitorul Târgu Jiu (assistant)
- 2022–2024: FC U Craiova II
- 2024–2025: Viitorul Onești
- 2025: Gloria Buzău (assistant)
- 2026: Metaloglobus București (assistant)
- 2026–: Partizani Tirana (assistant)
- * Club domestic league appearances and goals

Ovidiu Liviu Dănănae (born 26 August 1985) is a Romanian professional football manager and former player, currently assistant coach at Kategoria Superiore club Partizani Tirana.

== Career statistics ==
=== International ===
National team	Year	Apps	Goals
Romania
Romania	2009	1	0
Romania	2010	3	0
Total		3	0

== Honours ==
=== Player ===
FC U Craiova

- Liga II: 2005–06
- Liga III: 2019–20

Apollon Limassol

- Cypriot Super Cup runner-up: 2013

=== Coach ===
FC U Craiova II

- Liga IV – Dolj County: 2022–23
