= Dorinel Popa =

Romanian footballer

Dorian Popa
Personal information
- Date of birth: 29 November 1988 (age 37)
- Place of birth: Focșani, Romania
- Height: 1.75 m (5 ft 9 in)
- Position: Midfielder

Youth career
- 1992–2005: Unirea Focșani

Senior career*
Years	Team	Apps	(Gls)
2005	Focșani		
2005	→ Energia Vulturu (loan)		
2006–2010	Gloria Buzău	71	(2)
2010–2011	Victoria Brănești	43	(5)
2011	Steaua București	1	(0)
2012	Universitatea Cluj	16	(0)
2013–2014	Academica Argeș	1	(0)
2014	Inter Clinceni	1	(0)
2015–2016	Balotești	24	(1)
2016	Șoimii Pâncota	3	(0)
2017	Focșani		
2019	Focșani		
- * Club domestic league appearances and goals as of 23 July 2018

Dorinel Popa is a Romanian footballer.
