= Iasmin Latovlevici =

Romanian footballer (born 1986)

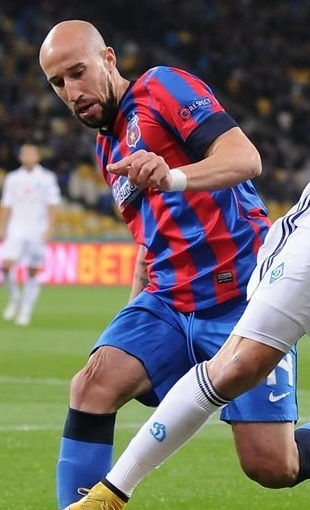
- Latovlevici with Steaua București in 2014

Personal information
- Date of birth: 11 May 1986 (age 40)
- Place of birth: Moldova Nouă, Romania
- Height: 1.75 m (5 ft 9 in)
- Position: Left-back

Team information
- Current team: ASU Politehnica Timișoara U17 (head coach)

Youth career
- 1994–2002: Minerul Moldova Nouă
- 2002–2005: LPS Banatul Timișoara
- 2005: Golf Timișoara

Senior career*
Years	Team	Apps	(Gls)
2005–2010	Politehnica Timișoara	33	(0)
2006–2008	Politehnica II Timișoara	24	(1)
2005	→ CFR Timișoara (loan)	14	(0)
2009–2010	→ Gloria Bistrița (loan)	12	(0)
2010–2015	Steaua București	110	(7)
2015–2016	Gençlerbirliği	10	(0)
2016–2017	Karabükspor	30	(3)
2017–2018	Galatasaray	10	(0)
2018–2020	Bursaspor	39	(4)
2020	Kisvárda	0	(0)
2020–2021	CFR Cluj	12	(1)
2021–2022	Argeș Pitești	35	(1)
2023	Petrolul Ploiești	0	(0)
Total		329	(17)

International career
2006–2008	Romania U21	8	(0)
2011–2017	Romania	13	(0)

Managerial career
- 2024: ASU Politehnica Timișoara U18
- 2025–: ASU Politehnica Timișoara U17
- * Club domestic league appearances and goals

Iasmin Latovlevici (Serbian Cyrillic: Јасмин Латовљевић, romanized: Jasmin Latovljević; born 11 May 1986) is a Romanian former professional footballer who played as a left-back, currently head coach at ASU Politehnica Timișoara U17.

Latovlevici started out as a senior at CFR Timișoara in 2005, while on loan from Politehnica Timișoara. His performances inspired a move to Steaua București in 2010, where he won seven domestic trophies before moving abroad to Turkey. He represented several teams in the latter country, including Galatasaray with which he won the 2017–18 Süper Lig, and returned to Romania in 2020.

Latovlevici made his senior debut for the Romania national team in June 2011, in a 0–1 friendly loss to Brazil, and amassed 13 appearances for the nation.

== Club career ==
=== Early career and Politehnica Timișoara ===
After appearing in all matches in the first part of the 2005–06 season for CFR Timișoara, Latovlevici was transferred to neighbouring club Politehnica Timișoara and made his Divizia A debut the same season, in a match against Oțelul Galați.

=== Steaua București ===
On 8 July 2010, Latovlevici signed a five-year deal with FC Steaua București. He made his competitive debut on 25 July, in 2–1 Liga I away victory over Universitatea Cluj.

On 21 February 2013, Latovlevici opened the scoring in a 2–0 win over Ajax in the second leg of the UEFA Europa League round of 32; his side managed to qualify after winning 4–2 at the subsequent penalty shootout.

During his five-year stint in the capital, Latovlevici won seven domestic titles, amassing 177 appearances and 12 goals in all competitions.

=== Turkey ===
On 30 June 2015, Latovlevici agreed to a three-year contract with Turkish club Gençlerbirliği. He then joined Kardemir Karabükspor in the summer of 2016, also in the Süper Lig.

On 7 September 2017, Galatasaray announced the transfer of Latovlevici for a €550,000 fee. He signed a one-year deal with the option of another season, which would have been activated in case he made 18 appearances for the team. He recorded his debut nine days later, in a 2–0 league win over Kasımpaşa.

After failing to meet the number of appearances required for staying at Galatasaray, Latovlevici agreed to a one-year contract with fellow league club Bursaspor on 28 August 2018. He scored three goals from 25 games as the season ended in relegation for "the Green Crocodiles", but extended his deal nevertheless.

=== Late career ===
On 5 October 2020, after a brief spell at Hungarian side Kisvárda during which he did not make any appearances, Latovlevici returned to Romania by signing a contract with defending champions CFR Cluj. He played seven league games in the remainder of the season, as "the White-Burgundies" won their fourth consecutive championship title.

On 28 September 2021, Latovlevici moved to fellow Liga I team FC Argeș Pitești on a two-year deal. He terminated his contract on 8 November 2022, after executive director Daniel Stanciu publicly stated that Argeș lost several matches because of his blunders.

In April 2023, it was reported that Latovlevici signed for Petrolul Ploiești, although not officially confirmed by the club's website. The following month, rumours surfaced that a group of supporters opposed his signing and tried to remove a Petrolul shirt from him during a training, which led Latovlevici to promptly leave the team; head coach Florin Pârvu confirmed the incident, but stated that Latovlevici was still under contract.

== International career ==
After representing Romania at under-21 level, Latovlevici made his full debut for the country in a 0–1 friendly loss to Brazil in São Paulo, on 7 June 2011.

== Personal life ==
In June 2013, Latovlevici married his partner Roxana in a Serbian church in Timișoara, with his former Politehnica Timișoara teammate Costel Pantilimon acting as best man.

== Career statistics ==
=== Club ===
Appearances and goals by club, season and competition
Club	Season	League			National cup		League cup		Continental		Other (Note: All appearances in Supercupa României)		Total	
Club	Season	Division	Apps	Goals	Apps	Goals	Apps	Goals	Apps	Goals	Apps	Goals	Apps	Goals
Politehnica Timișoara	2005–06	Divizia A	2	0	0	0	—		—		—		2	0
Politehnica Timișoara	2006–07	Liga I	2	0	1	0	—		—		—		3	0
Politehnica Timișoara	2007–08	Liga I	7	0	0	0	—		—		—		7	0
Politehnica Timișoara	2008–09	Liga I	20	0	3	0	—		0	0	—		23	0
Politehnica Timișoara	2009–10	Liga I	2	0	0	0	—		2 (Note: Appearances in UEFA Champions League)	0	—		4	0
Politehnica Timișoara	Total		33	0	4	0	0	0	2	0	0	0	39	0
CFR Timișoara (loan)	2005–06	Divizia B	14	0	0	0	—		—		—		14	0
Gloria Bistrița (loan)	2009–10	Liga I	12	0	—		—		—		—		12	0
Steaua București	2010–11	Liga I	27	0	4	1	—		8 (Note: Appearance(s) in UEFA Europa League)	0	—		39	1
Steaua București	2011–12	Liga I	22	1	1	0	—		9	0	1	0	33	1
Steaua București	2012–13	Liga I	24	2	0	0	—		13	2	—		37	4
Steaua București	2013–14	Liga I	25	3	4	1	—		12	1	1	0	42	5
Steaua București	2014–15	Liga I	12	1	1	0	2	0	10 (Note: Six appearances in UEFA Champions League, four appearances in UEFA Europa League)	0	1	0	26	1
Steaua București	Total		110	7	10	2	2	0	52	3	3	0	177	12
Gençlerbirliği	2015–16	Süper Lig	10	0	1	0	—		—		—		11	0
Karabükspor	2016–17	Süper Lig	30	3	—		—		—		—		30	3
Galatasaray	2017–18	Süper Lig	10	0	5	0	—		—		—		15	0
Bursaspor	2018–19	Süper Lig	25	3	1	0	—		—		—		26	3
Bursaspor	2019–20	TFF 1. Lig	14	1	1	0	—		—		—		15	1
Bursaspor	Total		39	4	2	0	0	0	0	0	0	0	41	4
CFR Cluj	2020–21	Liga I	7	0	1	0	—		1	0	0	0	9	0
CFR Cluj	2021–22	Liga I	5	1	0	0	—		2	0	0	0	7	1
CFR Cluj	Total		12	1	1	0	0	0	3	0	0	0	16	1
Argeș Pitești	2021–22	Liga I	24	1	4	0	—		—		—		28	1
Argeș Pitești	2022–23	Liga I	11	0	1	0	—		—		—		12	0
Argeș Pitești	Total		35	1	5	0	0	0	0	0	0	0	40	1
Career total			305	16	28	2	2	0	57	3	3	0	395	21

=== International ===
Appearances and goals by national team and year
National team	Year	Apps	Goals
Romania	2011	3	0
Romania	2012	3	0
Romania	2013	3	0
Romania	2014	0	0
Romania	2015	0	0
Romania	2016	2	0
Romania	2017	2	0
Total		13	0

== Honours ==
Steaua București

- Liga I: 2012–13, 2013–14, 2014–15
- Cupa României: 2010–11, 2014–15
- Supercupa României: 2013
- Cupa Ligii: 2014–15

Galatasaray

- Süper Lig: 2017–18

CFR Cluj

- Liga I: 2020–21, 2021–22
- Supercupa României: 2020
