= Iulian Mamele =

Romanian footballer

Personal information
- Date of birth: 17 February 1985 (age 41)
- Place of birth: Bucharest, Romania
- Height: 1.82 m (5 ft 11 1/2 in)
- Position: Centre back

Senior career*
Years	Team	Apps	(Gls)
2007–2012	Concordia Chiajna	112	(3)
2012–2014	Pandurii Târgu Jiu	43	(1)
2014–2015	Viitorul Constanța	26	(0)
2015–2017	Concordia Chiajna	30	(0)
Total		211	(4)
- * Club domestic league appearances and goals as of 21 January 2017

Iulian Mamele (born 17 February 1985 in Bucharest, Romania) is a Romanian former footballer who played as a centre back.

== Honours ==
=== Club ===
Pandurii

- Liga I (1): runner-up 2013
