= Florin Costea =

Romanian professional footballer

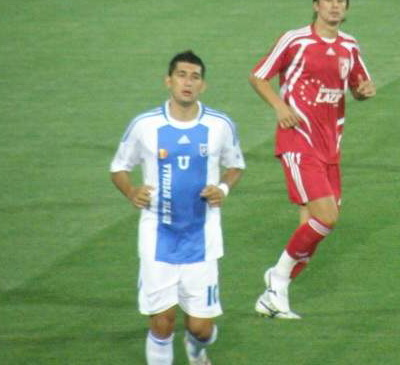
- Costea playing for U Craiova

Personal information
- Full name: Florin Constantin Costea
- Date of birth: 16 May 1985 (age 41)
- Place of birth: Drăgășani, Romania
- Height: 1.84 m (6 ft 0 in)
- Position: Striker

Youth career
- 1994–1998: FC Teleșpan 97
- 1998–2003: Oltchim Râmnicu Vâlcea

Senior career*
Years	Team	Apps	(Gls)
2003–2004	Rarora Râmnicu Vâlcea	12	(3)
2004–2005	CSM Râmnicu Vâlcea	10	(4)
2006–2011	Universitatea Craiova	119	(47)
2011–2012	Steaua București	19	(1)
2013	CS Turnu Severin	14	(8)
2013–2015	CFR Cluj	40	(4)
2015	Arsenal Tula	7	(0)
2015	Zakho	1	(0)
2016	CSM Râmnicu Vâlcea	6	(5)
2017	Șirineasa		
2018–2019	FC U Craiova		
2019	Atletic Bradu		
2019–2023	Viitorul Dăești		
2023–2024	ARO Muscelul Câmpulung		
2024–2025	Viitorul Budești		
Total		228	(72)

International career
2008–2009	Romania	6	(0)

Managerial career
- 2024–2025: FC U Craiova (sporting director)
- * Club domestic league appearances and goals

Florin Constantin Costea (born 16 May 1985) is a Romanian former professional footballer who played as a striker.

== Club career ==
=== Universitatea Craiova ===
Costea started in the Romanian Divizia B for the local teams Rarora Râmnicu-Vâlcea and CSM Râmnicu Vâlcea, then he transferred to one of the most popular teams in Romania Universitatea Craiova, who competed at the time in the same league.

After his new team was promoted, he became one of their key players and one of the best strikers of the Liga I. The 2008–09 season was great for Costea, finishing the top scorer of the Romanian first division, together with Gigel Bucur after both had scored 17 goals.

On 21 March 2010, while playing a match against Politehnica Iaşi, the opposing goalkeeper made a rash challenge on Costea, injuring him. He was forced to leave the pitch, and realising the severity of his injury he was taken out in tears. It was later discovered that he had broken his Medial collateral ligament and Cruciate ligament. He was sidelined for eight months.

After Universitatea Craiova was disaffiliated, he became a free agent.

=== Steaua București ===
On 3 August 2011, Costea moved to Steaua București on a free transfer, signing a four-year contract, worth around €300,000 per year. There, he rejoined his brother Mihai Costea.

== International career ==
Since 2008 he gathered six selections in the Romania national football team. His first selection was courtesy to an injury of Romanian star attacker Adrian Mutu.

== Personal life ==
He is the older brother of Mihai Costea.

== Career statistics ==
Appearances and goals by national team and year
National team	Year	Apps	Goals
Romania	2008	4	0
Romania	2009	2	0
Total		6	0

== Honours ==
CSM Râmnicu Vâlcea

- Divizia C: 2004–05

Universitatea Craiova

- Divizia B: 2005–06

ARO Muscelul Câmpulung

- Liga IV – Argeș County: 2022–23

Individual

- Liga I top scorer: 2008–09 (17 goals) (joint with Gigel Bucur)
