= Paul Pîrvulescu =

Romanian footballer

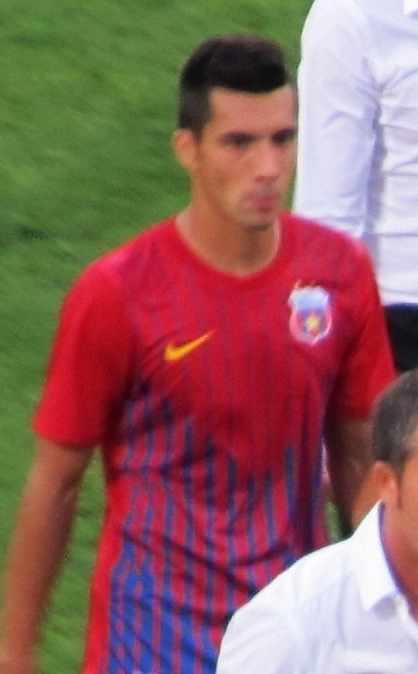
- Pârvulescu with Steaua in 2013

Personal information
- Full name: Paul Ovidiu Pîrvulescu
- Date of birth: 11 August 1988 (age 38)
- Place of birth: Mediaș, Romania
- Height: 1.79 m (5 ft 10 in)
- Positions: Left winger; left-back

Team information
- Current team: Minaur Baia Mare (head coach)

Youth career
- –2006: Gaz Metan Mediaș

Senior career*
Years	Team	Apps	(Gls)
2006–2011	Gaz Metan Mediaș	118	(11)
2012–2016	Steaua București	46	(2)
2015	→ Viitorul Constanța (loan)	1	(0)
2015	→ Voluntari (loan)	12	(1)
2016	→ ASA Târgu Mureș (loan)	9	(0)
2016–2017	St. Pölten	20	(0)
2017–2018	Wisła Płock	2	(0)
2018	Gaz Metan Mediaș	6	(0)
2018	Politehnica Iași	4	(0)
2019–2021	Academica Clinceni	64	(1)
2022	Universitatea Cluj	17	(0)
2022–2023	FK Csíkszereda	10	(0)
2023–2024	Concordia Chiajna	10	(0)
Total		319	(15)

International career
2009–2010	Romania U21	10	(0)

Managerial career
- 2024–2026: Inter Ilfov
- 2026: Tunari
- 2026–: Minaur Baia Mare
- * Club domestic league appearances and goals

Paul Ovidiu Pîrvulescu (born 11 August 1988) is a Romanian professional football manager and former player, currently in charge of Liga III club Minaur Baia Mare.

== Club career ==
On 4 January 2012 Steaua București signed Pîrvulescu from fellow Liga I club Gaz Metan Mediaș. Soon after the player penned a five-year contract to keep him at the club until the summer of 2016.

On 23 June 2017, Pîrvulescu signed a one-year contract with Polish club Wisła Płock. On 18 July 2018, he returned to the Romanian Liga I and signed a short contract with FC Politehnica Iași.

== Career statistics ==
Appearances and goals by club, season and competition
Club	Season	League			National cup (Note: Includes Cupa României, Austrian Cup, Polish Cup)		Europe		Other		Total	
Club	Season	Division	Apps	Goals	Apps	Goals	Apps	Goals	Apps	Goals	Apps	Goals
Gaz Metan Mediaș	2006–07	Liga II	16	0	0	0	—		—		16	0
Gaz Metan Mediaș	2007–08	Liga II	16	3	0	0	—		—		16	3
Gaz Metan Mediaș	2008–09	Liga I	16	1	0	0	—		—		16	1
Gaz Metan Mediaș	2009–10	Liga I	29	2	0	0	—		—		29	2
Gaz Metan Mediaș	2010–11	Liga I	29	4	0	0	—		—		29	4
Gaz Metan Mediaș	2011–12	Liga I	12	1	3	0	3 (Note: Appearances in UEFA Europa League)	0	—		18	1
Gaz Metan Mediaș	Total		118	11	3	0	3	0	—		124	11
Steaua București	2011–12	Liga I	13	1	—		—		—		13	1
Steaua București	2012–13	Liga I	12	0	2	0	5	0	—		19	0
Steaua București	2013–14	Liga I	15	1	3	0	2 (Note: Appearances in UEFA Champions League)	0	0	0	20	1
Steaua București	2014–15	Liga I	6	0	0	0	3	0	2 (Note: One appearance in Cupa Ligii, one appearance in Supercupa României)	0	11	0
Steaua București	Total		46	2	5	0	10	0	2	0	63	2
Viitorul Constanța (loan)	2014–15	Liga I	1	0	—		—		—		1	0
Voluntari (loan)	2015–16	Liga I	12	1	1	0	—		1 (Note: Appearance in Cupa Ligii)	0	14	1
ASA Târgu Mureș (loan)	2015–16	Liga I	9	0	2	0	—		—		11	0
St. Pölten	2016–17	Austrian Bundesliga	20	0	2	0	—		—		22	0
Wisła Płock	2017–18	Ekstraklasa	2	0	1	0	—		—		3	0
Gaz Metan Mediaș	2017–18	Liga I	6	0	1	0	—		—		7	0
Politehnica Iași	2018–19	Liga I	4	0	0	0	—		—		4	0
Academica Clinceni	2018–19	Liga I	13	1	—		—		—		13	1
Academica Clinceni	2019–20	Liga I	18	0	1	0	—		—		19	0
Academica Clinceni	2020–21	Liga I	19	0	1	0	—		—		20	0
Academica Clinceni	2021–22	Liga I	14	0	1	0	—		—		15	0
Academica Clinceni	Total		64	1	3	0	0	0	—		67	1
Universitatea Cluj	2021–22	Liga II	12	0	—		—		2 (Note: Appearances in Liga I promotion/relegation play-offs)	0	14	0
Universitatea Cluj	2022–23	Liga I	5	0	0	0	—		—		5	0
Universitatea Cluj	Total		17	0	0	0	—		2	0	19	0
FK Csíkszereda	2022–23	Liga II	10	0	—		—		—		10	0
Concordia Chiajna	2023–24	Liga II	10	0	1	0	—		—		11	0
Career total			319	15	19	0	13	0	5	0	356	15

== Honours ==
Steaua București

- Liga I: 2012–13, 2013–14, 2014–15
- Supercupa României: 2013
