= 2013 Supercupa României =

- Event: 2013 Supercupa României
Steaua București	Petrolul Ploiești
Liga I	Cupa României
3	0
- Date: 10 July 2013
- Venue: Arena Națională, Bucharest
- Man of the Match: Mihai Pintilii
- Referee: Ovidiu Haţegan
- Attendance: 29,459
- Weather: Clear night 24 °C (75 °F)

The 2013 Supercupa României was the 15th edition of the Supercupa României, the annual super cup in Romania.

The game was contested by the winners of the previous season's Liga I and Cupa României competitions, Steaua București and Petrolul Ploiești, respectively. It was played at the Arena Națională in Bucharest, on 10 July 2013.

Steaua București won the trophy by scoring three goals, while Petrolul Ploiești did not score. 29,459 people attended the match.

== Teams ==
Team	Qualification	Previous participations (bold indicates winners)
Steaua București	Winners of the 2012–13 Liga I	8 (**1994**, **1995**, **1998**, 1999, **2001**, 2005, **2006**, 2011)
Petrolul Ploiești	Winners of the 2012–13 Cupa României	1 (1995)

== Match ==
=== Details ===
10 July 2013
20:45 EEST

Steaua București	3–0	Petrolul Ploiești
Nikolić 21'; Bourceanu (penalty missed) 29'; Szukała 32'; Pintilii 41'	Report

Arena Națională, Bucharest
Attendance: 29,459
Referee: Ovidiu Hațegan (Romania)

**Steaua București**	**Petrolul Ploiești**

STEAUA:
GK	**12**	(Romania) Ciprian Tătărușanu
RB	**17**	(North Macedonia) Daniel Georgievski		(substituted off) 66'
CB	**4**	(Poland) Łukasz Szukała
CB	**21**	(Romania) Vlad Chiricheș
LB	**14**	(Romania) Iasmin Latovlevici
DM	**55**	(Romania) Alexandru Bourceanu (c)	(yellow card) 89'
DM	**5**	(Romania) Mihai Pintilii	(yellow card) 45'
RW	**77**	(Romania) Adrian Popa
AM	**80**	(Romania) Gabriel Iancu		(substituted off) 57'
LW	**10**	(Romania) Cristian Tănase	(yellow card) 10'
FW	90	(Montenegro) Stefan Nikolić		(substituted off) 61'
Substitutes:
GK	**95**	(Romania) Valentin Cojocaru
CB	**6**	(Romania) Florin Gardoș
LB	**22**	(Romania) Paul Pârvulescu
MF	**11**	(Romania) Andrei Prepeliță		(substituted on) 66'
AM	**23**	(Romania) Nicolae Stanciu		(substituted on) 57'
FW	**9**	(Romania) Mihai Costea
FW	**25**	(Italy) Federico Piovaccari		(substituted on) 61'
Manager:
(Romania) Laurențiu Reghecampf

PETROLUL:
GK	12	(Brazil) Peterson Peçanha
RB	32	(Romania) Sebastian Achim
CB	4	(Central African Republic) Manassé Enza-Yamissi	(yellow card) 8' (yellow-red card) 28'
CB	6	(Romania) Ionuț Neag		(substituted off) 56'
LB	21	(Brazil) Guilherme	(yellow card) 73'
CM	15	(Romania) Ovidiu Hoban
CM	5	(Haiti) Sony Mustivar (c)		(substituted off) 80'
RW	8	(France) Damien Boudjemaa
AM	10	(Romania) Adrian Cristea		(substituted off) 57'
LW	7	(Romania) Gheorghe Grozav	(yellow card) 32'
FW	9	(Tunisia) Hamza Younés
Substitutes:
GK	22	(Lithuania) Povilas Valinčius
DF	16	(Azerbaijan) Elhad Naziri
LB	29	(Romania) Constantin Grecu
AM	18	(Romania) Marian Cristescu		(substituted on) 80'
MF	52	(Brazil) Romário		(substituted on) 56'
MF	80	(Portugal) Filipe Teixeira		(substituted on) 57'
Manager:
(Romania) Cosmin Contra

**Man of the Match**

- (Romania) Mihai Pintilii
- Assistant referees:
  - Octavian Șovre
  - Aurel Onița
- Fourth official:
  - István Kovács
- Additional assistant referees:
  - Cristian Balaj
  - Alexandru Tudor

**Match rules**

- 90 minutes.
- 30 minutes of extra-time if necessary.
- Penalty shoot-out if scores still level.
- Seven named substitutes.
- Maximum of three substitutions.

=== Statistics ===
Overall
Statistic	Steaua București	Petrolul Ploiești
Goals scored	3	0
Total shots	14	6
Shots on target	5	3
Ball possession	50%	50%
Corner kicks	8	7
Fouls committed	19	12
Offsides	3	0
Yellow cards	3	4
Red cards	0	1

== Post-match ==
Laurențiu Reghecampf won his first Supercupa României as a manager; he previously won the honour as a player in 1998, also with Steaua București. Petrolul Ploiești lost its second super cup to Steaua București, after the one in the 1995 edition.

== See also ==
- 2013–14 Liga I
- 2013–14 Cupa României
