= 2013–14 FC Steaua București season =

Steaua București
2013–14 season
- Owner: George Becali
- President: Valeriu Argăseală
- Head coach: Laurențiu Reghecampf
- Stadium: Arena Națională; Stadionul Steaua
- Liga I: 1st (champions)
- Cupa României: Runners-up
- Supercupa României: Winners
- Champions League: Group stage
- Top goalscorer: League: Federico Piovaccari (10); All: Federico Piovaccari (16)
- Average home league attendance: 9,611
Home colours	Away colours

The 2013–14 season was the 66th season in the existence of FC Steaua București and the club's 66th consecutive season in the top flight of Romanian football. In addition to the domestic league, Steaua București participated in this season's edition of the Cupa României, the Supercupa României and the UEFA Champions League.

== Season notes ==
During the season Alexandru Aldea changed his shirt number 18 with the number 31.

Alexandru Bourceanu was Steaua captain until was transferred to Trabzonspor, from round 20 to final season captain was Mihai Pintilii.

== Players ==
=== First-team squad ===
Note: Flags indicate national team as defined under FIFA eligibility rules; some limited exceptions apply. Players may hold more than one non-FIFA nationality.

No.	Pos.	Nation	Player
1	GK	ROU	Florin Niță
2	DF	ROU	Cornel Râpă
4	DF	POL	Łukasz Szukała
5	MF	ROU	Mihai Pintilii (captain)
6	DF	ROU	Florin Gardoș (3rd vice-captain)
7	MF	ROU	Alexandru Chipciu (2nd vice-captain)
8	MF	ROU	Lucian Filip
10	MF	ROU	Cristian Tănase (vice-captain)
11	MF	ROU	Andrei Prepeliță
12	GK	ROU	Ciprian Tătărușanu
14	DF	ROU	Iasmin Latovlevici
16	DF	ROU	Gabriel Matei
17	DF	MKD	Daniel Georgievski
18	MF	ROU	Lucian Sânmărtean
22	DF	ROU	Paul Pârvulescu

No.	Pos.	Nation	Player
23	MF	ROU	Nicolae Stanciu
25	FW	ITA	Federico Piovaccari (on loan from Sampdoria)
26	MF	ROU	Ionuț Neagu
27	MF	ROU	Răzvan Grădinaru
28	FW	ROU	Claudiu Keșerü
29	MF	ROU	Alexandru Târnovan
30	MF	ROU	Mihai Răduț
31	MF	ROU	Alexandru Aldea
33	DF	CPV	Fernando Varela
35	FW	GRE	Pantelis Kapetanos
77	MF	ROU	Adrian Popa
80	FW	ROU	Gabriel Iancu
86	GK	MKD	Martin Bogatinov
95	GK	ROU	Valentin Cojocaru
97	MF	ROU	Robert Vâlceanu

==== Youth players with first-team appearances ====
Note: Flags indicate national team as defined under FIFA eligibility rules; some limited exceptions apply. Players may hold more than one non-FIFA nationality.

No.	Pos.	Nation	Player
—	MF	ROU	Alexandru Mitriță (on loan from Viitorul Constanța)

=== Transfers ===
==== In ====
No.	Pos.	Nat.	Name	Age	EU	Moving from	Type	Transfer window	Ends	Transfer fee	Source
—	MF	(Romania)	Mihai Onicaș	23	EU	Viitorul Constanța	Loan return	Summer	2014	—	
1	GK	(Romania)	Florin Niță	25	EU	Concordia Chiajna	Free transfer	Summer	Undisclosed	—	
23	MF	(Romania)	Nicolae Stanciu	20	EU	Vaslui	Transfer	Summer	Undisclosed	€700,000	
30	MF	(Romania)	Mihai Răduț	23	EU	Pandurii Târgu Jiu	Loan return	Summer	Undisclosed	—	
25	FW	(Italy)	Federico Piovaccari	28	EU	Sampdoria (Italy)	Loan	Summer	2014	Undisclosed	
19	MF	(Romania)	Adrian Cristea	29	EU	Petrolul Ploiești	Free transfer	Summer	2015	—	
33	DF	(Cape Verde) (Portugal)	Fernando Varela	25	EU	Vaslui	Transfer	Summer	Undisclosed	€1,250,000	FCSB
26	MF	(Romania)	Ionuț Neagu	23	EU	Oțelul Galați	Transfer	Summer	Undisclosed	€620,000	FCSB
35	FW	(Greece)	Pantelis Kapetanos	30	EU	CFR Cluj	Transfer	Summer	Undisclosed	Free	FCSB
29	FW	(Romania)	Alexandru Târnovan	18	EU	Viitorul Constanța	Transfer	Winter	Undisclosed	Undisclosed	FCSB
28	FW	(Romania)	Claudiu Keșerü	27	EU	Bastia (France)	Transfer	Winter	Undisclosed	Free	FCSB
31	MF	(Romania)	Alexandru Aldea	18	EU	Youth system	Promoted	Winter	Undisclosed	—	
27	MF	(Romania)	Răzvan Grădinaru	18	EU	Youth system	Promoted	Winter	Undisclosed	—	
97	MF	(Romania)	Robert Vâlceanu	16	EU	Youth system	Promoted	Winter	Undisclosed	—	
86	GK	(North Macedonia)	Martin Bogatinov	27	Non-EU	Karpaty Lviv (Ukraine)	Free transfer	Winter	Undisclosed	—	
18	MF	(Romania)	Lucian Sânmărtean	33	EU	Vaslui	Transfer	Winter	2015	€150,000	

==== Out ====
No.	Pos.	Nat.	Name	Age	EU	Moving to	Type	Transfer window	Transfer fee	Source
99	FW	(Brazil)	Adi Rocha	27	Non-EU	Gamba Osaka (Japan)	End of contract	Summer	—	Gamba
—	MF	(Romania)	Mihai Onicaș	23	EU	Târgu Mureș	Loan	Summer	Free	
1	GK	(Romania)	Răzvan Stanca	33	EU	Pandurii Târgu Jiu	Mutual termination	Summer	—	Pandurii
24	FW	(Romania)	Raul Rusescu	25	EU	Sevilla (Spain)	Transfer	Summer	Undisclosed	FCSB
19	DF	(Romania)	Valeriu Lupu	22	EU	Săgeata Năvodari	Loan	Summer	Free	
28	MF	(Romania)	Iulian Roșu	19	EU	Clinceni	Loan	Summer	Free	
25	MF	(Romania)	Cristian Pușcaș	19	EU	Clinceni	Loan	Summer	Free	
27	MF	(Romania)	Ionuț Năstăsie	21	EU	Viitorul Constanța	Transfer	Summer	Undisclosed	
21	DF	(Romania)	Vlad Chiricheș	23	EU	Tottenham Hotspur (England)	Transfer	Summer	€9,500,000	Tottenham
3	DF	(Romania)	Doru Bratu	24	EU	Pandurii Târgu Jiu	Transfer	Winter	Free	
19	MF	(Romania)	Adrian Cristea	30	EU	Concordia Chiajna	Released	Winter	—	FCSB
9	FW	(Romania)	Mihai Costea	27	EU	Voluntari	Out of team	Winter	—	
20	FW	(Brazil)	Leandro Tatu	31	Non-EU	Bangkok United (Thailand)	Mutual termination	Winter	—	
90	FW	(Montenegro)	Stefan Nikolić	23	Non-EU	Incheon United (South Korea)	Mutual termination	Winter	—	
55	MF	(Romania)	Alexandru Bourceanu	28	EU	Trabzonspor (Turkey)	Transfer	Winter	€1,300,000	

== Statistics ==
=== Goalscorers ===
Last updated on 20 May 2014 (UTC)

Player	Liga I	Cupa României	Supercupa României	Champions League	Total
(Italy) Federico Piovaccari	10	2	0	4	16
(Romania) Claudiu Keșerü	8	1	0	0	9
(Romania) Adrian Popa	7	0	0	0	7
(Romania) Alexandru Chipciu	6	1	0	0	7
(Romania) Nicolae Stanciu	5	0	0	1	6
(Cape Verde) Fernando Varela	4	1	0	0	5
(Poland) Łukasz Szukała	4	0	1	0	5
(Greece) Pantelis Kapetanos	3	2	0	0	5
(Romania) Iasmin Latovlevici	3	1	0	1	5
(Romania) Cristian Tănase	2	2	0	1	5
(Romania) Gabriel Iancu	2	0	0	2	4
(Romania) Andrei Prepeliță	3	0	0	0	3
(Romania) Florin Gardoș	2	0	0	0	2
(Romania) Lucian Filip	2	0	0	0	2
(Romania) Lucian Sânmărtean	2	0	0	0	2
(North Macedonia) Daniel Georgievski	1	1	0	0	2
(Brazil) Leandro Tatu	1	0	0	1	2
(Romania) Mihai Răduț	0	2	0	0	2
(Romania) Mihai Pintilii	0	0	1	1	2
(Romania) Adrian Cristea	1	0	0	0	1
(Romania) Robert Vâlceanu	1	0	0	0	1
(Romania) Paul Pârvulescu	1	0	0	0	1
(Romania) Alexandru Târnovan	0	1	0	0	1
(Montenegro) Stefan Nikolić	0	0	1	0	1
(Romania) Alexandru Bourceanu	0	0	0	1	1
Own goals
(Romania) Adrian Puțanu	2	0	0	0	2
(Cameroon) Collins Fai	1	0	0	0	1
(Montenegro) Igor Pavlović	0	0	0	1	1

== Competitions ==
=== Supercupa României ===
==== Results ====
10 July 2013 Final	Steaua București	3–0	Petrolul Ploiești	Bucharest
20:45	Nikolić 21'; Bourceanu (penalty missed) 29'; Szukała 32'; Pintilii 41'	Report		Stadium: Arena Națională; Attendance: 29,459; Referee: Ovidiu Hațegan

=== Liga I ===
==== League table ====
Pos	Team	Pld	W	D	L	GF	GA	GD	Pts	Qualification or relegation
1	Steaua București (C)	34	22	11	1	71	20	+51	77	Qualification to Champions League second qualifying round
2	Astra Giurgiu	34	22	6	6	70	28	+42	72	Qualification to Europa League third qualifying round
3	Petrolul Ploiești	34	18	14	2	53	20	+33	68	Qualification to Europa League second qualifying round
4	Dinamo București	34	17	8	9	52	34	+18	59	(Note: Vaslui did not receive a license for financial reasons. Dinamo București filed for insolvency, thus didn't get an UEFA licence. CFR Cluj got their Europa League spot.)
5	CFR Cluj	34	13	12	9	44	33	+11	51	Qualification to Europa League second qualifying round

Source: Liga I (in Romanian)
Rules for classification: 1) points; 2) goal difference; 3) number of goals scored.
(C) Champions

==== Results summary ====
Overall								Home						Away					
Pld	W	D	L	GF	GA	GD	Pts	W	D	L	GF	GA	GD	W	D	L	GF	GA	GD
34	22	11	1	71	20	+51	77	12	4	1	45	9	+36	10	7	0	26	11	+15

Source: LT

==== Results by round ====
Round	1	2	3	4	5	6	7	8	9	10	11	12	13	14	15	16	17	18	19	20	21	22	23	24	25	26	27	28	29	30	31	32	33	34
Ground	H	A	H	A	H	A	H	A	H	A	H	A	A	H	A	H	A	A	H	A	H	A	H	A	H	A	H	A	H	H	A	H	A	H
Result	W	D	W	W	W	D	W	W	W	W	W	W	D	W	D	D	D	W	W	W	D	W	W	W	W	D	L	W	W	W	W	D	D	D
Position	4	5	2	2	2	1	1	1	1	1	1	1	1	1	1	1	2	2	1	1	1	1	1	1	1	1	1	1	1	1	1	1	1	1

Source: Matches
A = Away; H = Home; W = Win; D = Draw; L = Loss

==== Points by opponent ====
Team	Results		Points
Team	Home	Away	Points
Astra Giurgiu	3–1	1–1	4
Botoșani	4–0	2–1	6
Brașov	3–0	2–1	6
Ceahlăul Piatra Neamț	2–1	2–0	6
CFR Cluj	3–0	1–0	6
Concordia Chiajna	4–0	4–1	6
Corona Brașov	3–0	1–1	4
Dinamo București	1–1	2–1	4
Gaz Metan Mediaș	3–0	2–2	4
Oțelul Galați	2–2	1–1	2
Pandurii Târgu Jiu	2–2	1–1	2
Petrolul Ploiești	1–1	0–0	2
Poli Timișoara	3–0	0–0	4
Săgeata Năvodari	5–0	2–1	6
Universitatea Cluj	2–0	1–0	6
Vaslui	0–1	1–0	3
Viitorul Constanța	4–0	3–0	6

==== Matches ====
20 July 2013 Round 1	Steaua București	2–1	Ceahlăul Piatra Neamț	Bucharest
21:30 EEST	Popa 12'; Georgievski 27'	Report	Jula 40'	Stadium: Steaua; Attendance: 10,700; Referee: Radu Petrescu

21 December 2013 Round 2	Astra Giurgiu	1–1	Steaua București	Giurgiu
18:30 EET	Enache 35'	Report	Varela 45+1'	Stadium: Marin Anastasovici; Attendance: 4,000; Referee: Istvan Kovacs

14 February 2014 Round 3	Steaua București	4–0	Concordia Chiajna	Bucharest
21:30 EET	Varela 9'; Chipciu 32', 60'; Sânmărtean 43' (pen.)	Report		Stadium: Steaua; Attendance: 10,722; Referee: Cristian Balaj

10 August 2013 Round 4	Dinamo București	0–2	Steaua București	Bucharest
18:00 EEST		Report	Latovlevici 4'; Fai 38' (o.g.)	Stadium: Arena Națională; Attendance: 29,000; Referee: Cristian Balaj

17 August 2013 Round 5	Steaua București	3–0	CFR Cluj	Bucharest
18:00 EEST	Popa 8'; Piovaccari 12'; Tănase 60'	Report		Stadium: Steaua; Attendance: 13,700; Referee: Ovidiu Hațegan

24 August 2013 Round 6	Gaz Metan Mediaș	2–2	Steaua București	Mediaș
18:00 EEST	Buzean 11'; Robertson 27'	Report	Filip 74', 82'	Stadium: Gaz Metan; Attendance: 7,500; Referee: Sebastian Colțescu

14 September 2013 Round 7	Steaua București	5–0	Săgeata Năvodari	Bucharest
18:00 EEST	Piovaccari 4'; Prepeliță 20'; Ad. Cristea 41'; Kapetanos 72' (pen.), 82'	Report		Stadium: Steaua; Attendance: 7,542; Referee: Marcel Bârsan

22 September 2013 Round 8	Botoșani	1–2	Steaua București	Botoșani
18:00 EEST	Dinu 47'	Report	Szukała 22'; Piovaccari 27'	Stadium: Municipal; Attendance: 9,000; Referee: Cristian Balaj

28 September 2013 Round 9	Steaua București	3–0	ACS Poli Timișoara	Bucharest
18:00 EEST	Piovaccari 27'; Stanciu 40'; Popa 76'	Report		Stadium: Steaua; Attendance: 7,500; Referee: Robert Dumitru

5 October 2013 Round 10	Vaslui	0–1	Steaua București	Vaslui
18:00 EEST		Report	Piovaccari 47'	Stadium: Municipal; Attendance: 3,000; Referee: Sebastian Colțescu

18 October 2013 Round 11	Steaua București	4–0	Viitorul Constanța	Bucharest
18:00 EEST	Stanciu 9'; Puțanu 11' (o.g.), 65' (o.g.); Tatu 85'	Report		Stadium: Steaua; Attendance: 6,119; Referee: Iulian Călin

27 October 2013 Round 12	Brașov	1–2	Steaua București	Brașov
18:00 EET	Ionescu 10'	Report	Kapetanos 2'; Gardoș 47'	Stadium: Tineretului; Attendance: 4,000; Referee: Alexandru Tudor

2 November 2013 Round 13	Corona Brașov	1–1	Steaua București	Brașov
18:00 EET	Szukała 15' (o.g.)	Report	Stanciu 72' (pen.)	Stadium: Municipal; Attendance: 2,000; Referee: Florin Marcu

18 February 2014 Round 14	Steaua București	2–0	Universitatea Cluj	Bucharest
18:00 EET	Popa 45'; Szukała 80'	Report		Stadium: Steaua; Attendance: 10,875; Referee: Ovidiu Hațegan

23 November 2013 Round 15	Pandurii Târgu Jiu	1–1	Steaua București	Târgu Jiu
18:00 EET	Eric 27'	Report	Szukała 49'	Stadium: Tudor Vladimirescu; Attendance: 1,000; Referee: Radu Petrescu

1 December 2013 Round 16	Steaua București	1–1	Petrolul Ploiești	Bucharest
18:00 EET	Prepeliță 45+3'	Report	Benga 78'	Stadium: Steaua; Attendance: 10,464; Referee: Ovidiu Hațegan

8 December 2013 Round 17	Oțelul Galați	1–1	Steaua București	Galați
18:00 EET	Tudorie 77'	Report	Varela 38'	Stadium: Oțelul; Attendance: 3,500; Referee: Iulian Dima

14 December 2013 Round 18	Ceahlăul Piatra Neamț	0–2	Steaua București	Piatra Neamț
20:45 EET		Report	Popa 10'; Stanciu 44'	Stadium: Ceahlăul; Attendance: 4,500; Referee: Cristian Balaj

18 December 2013 Round 19	Steaua București	3–1	Astra Giurgiu	Bucharest
20:00 EET	Popa 16'; Gardoș 75'; Piovaccari 82'	Report	Budescu 50'	Stadium: Arena Națională; Attendance: 15,000; Referee: Alexandru Tudor

24 February 2014 Round 20	Concordia Chiajna	1–4	Steaua București	Chiajna
19:30 EET	Papasterianos 90+2'	Report	Chipciu 10'; Sânmărtean 17' (pen.); Stanciu 50'; Piovaccari 80'	Stadium: Concordia; Attendance: 5,000; Referee: George Rădulescu

1 March 2014 Round 21	Steaua București	1–1	Dinamo București	Bucharest
21:00 EET	Keșerü 89'	Report	Grigore 57' (pen.)	Stadium: Steaua; Attendance: 23,247; Referee: Alexandru Tudor

8 March 2014 Round 22	CFR Cluj	0–1	Steaua București	Cluj-Napoca
20:00 EET		Report	Chipciu 83'	Stadium: Dr. Constantin Rădulescu; Attendance: 19,000; Referee: Cristian Balaj

15 March 2014 Round 23	Steaua București	3–0	Gaz Metan Mediaș	Bucharest
20:15 EET	Keșerü 13'; Piovaccari 66'; Vâlceanu 90+3'	Report		Stadium: Steaua; Attendance: 8,615; Referee: George Rădulescu

23 March 2014 Round 24	Săgeata Năvodari	1–2	Steaua București	Constanța
19:00 EET	Guerra 13'	Report	Keșerü 33' (pen.); Varela 55'	Stadium: Farul; Attendance: 12,000; Referee: Adrian Comănescu

31 March 2014 Round 25	Steaua București	4–0	Botoșani	Bucharest
21:00 EEST	Popa 12'; Piovaccari 54'; Pârvulescu 64'; Tănase 68'	Report		Stadium: Steaua; Attendance: 6,605; Referee: Lucian Rusandu

5 April 2014 Round 26	ACS Poli Timișoara	0–0	Steaua București	Timișoara
21:30 EEST		Report		Stadium: Dan Păltinișanu; Attendance: 25,000; Referee: Marius Avram

11 April 2014 Round 27	Steaua București	0–1	Vaslui	Bucharest
20:30 EEST		Report	Temwanjera 87'	Stadium: Steaua; Attendance: 3,154; Referee: Andrei Chivulete

21 April 2014 Round 28	Viitorul Constanța	0–3	Steaua București	Chiajna
21:00 EEST		Report	Latovlevici 39'; Iancu 40'; Keșerü 50'	Stadium: Concordia; Attendance: 3,400; Referee: Cristian Balaj

28 April 2014 Round 29	Steaua București	3–0	Brașov	Bucharest
20:00 EEST	Latovlevici 42'; Chipciu 76'; Szukała 87'	Report		Stadium: Steaua; Attendance: 4,948; Referee: George Cătălin Găman

5 May 2014 Round 30	Steaua București	3–0	Corona Brașov	Bucharest
20:30 EEST	Piovaccari 18'; Chipciu 79'; Keșerü 90+1'	Report		Stadium: Steaua; Attendance: 0 Referee: Florin Andrei

8 May 2014 Round 31	Universitatea Cluj	0–1	Steaua București	Cluj
21:30 EEST		Report	Prepeliță 45+2'	Stadium: Cluj Arena; Attendance: 20,000; Referee: Marius Avram

12 May 2014 Round 32	Steaua București	2–2	Pandurii Târgu Jiu	Bucharest
21:00 EEST	Keșerü 8' (pen.); Iancu 16'	Report	Matulevičius 46'; Nistor 72'	Stadium: Steaua; Attendance: 0 Referee: Adrian Viorel Cojocaru

17 May 2014 Round 33	Petrolul Ploiești	0–0	Steaua București	Ploiești
21:30 EEST		Report		Stadium: Ilie Oană; Attendance: 15,000; Referee: Ovidiu Hațegan

20 May 2014 Round 34	Steaua București	2–2	Oțelul Galați	Bucharest
20:00 EEST	Keșerü 68', 88'	Report	Milea 62'; Pîrvulescu 83' (o.g.)	Stadium: Arena Națională; Attendance: 30,000; Referee: George Rădulescu

=== Cupa României ===
==== Results ====
26 September 2013 Round of 32	Steaua București	4–0	Avântul Bârsana	Berceni
20:30	Răduț 19', 69'; Kapetanos 63', 90'			Stadium: Berceni; Referee: Dan Botescu

30 October 2013 Round of 16	Steaua București	2–0	Poli Timișoara	Bucharest
20:00	Georgievski 11'; Piovaccari 74'			Stadium: Steaua; Referee: Cătălin Găman

5 December 2013 Quarterfinals	Steaua București	2–0	Oțelul Galați	Bucharest
20:30	Piovaccari 46'; Târnovan 84'			Stadium: Steaua; Referee: Marius Avram

27 March 2014 Semifinals	Steaua București	5–2	Dinamo București	Bucharest
20:30	Latovlevici 22'; Varela 39'; Chipciu 43'; Tănase 45+2'; Keșerü 76'		Rotariu 32'; Lazăr 53'	Stadium: Arena Națională; Referee: Ovidiu Hațegan

17 April 2014 Semifinals	Dinamo București	1–1 (3–6 agg.)	Steaua București	Bucharest
20:30	Matei 87'		Tănase 22'	Stadium: Arena Națională; Referee: István Kovács

23 May 2014 Final	Steaua București	0–0 (a.e.t.) (2–4 p)	Astra Giurgiu	Bucharest
21:00				Stadium: Arena Națională; Attendance: 48,201; Referee: Ovidiu Hațegan
	Penalties
	Keșerü (penalty scored); Varela (penalty missed); Pintilii (penalty missed); Szukała (penalty scored)		(penalty scored) Laban; (penalty scored) Júnior Morais; (penalty missed) Cristescu; (penalty scored) Budescu; (penalty scored) Yazalde

=== UEFA Champions League ===
==== Qualifying rounds ====
===== Second qualifying round =====
16 July 2013 First leg	Steaua București (Romania)	3–0	(North Macedonia) Vardar Skopje	Bucharest, Romania
20:45	Tănase 12'; Pintilii 21'; Pavlović 45+2' (o.g.)	Report		Stadium: Arena Națională; Attendance: 40,725; Referee: Radek Příhoda (Czech Republic)

23 July 2013 Second leg	Vardar Skopje (North Macedonia)	1–2 (1–5 agg.)	(Romania) Steaua București	Skopje, Macedonia
21:45	Kostovski 45+1'	Report	Piovaccari 24'; Bourceanu 72'	Stadium: Philip II Arena; Referee: Oleksandr Derdo (Ukraine)

===== Third qualifying round =====
30 July 2013 First leg	Dinamo Tbilisi (Georgia (country))	0–2	(Romania) Steaua București	Tbilisi, Georgia
19:00		Report	Iancu 64', 80'	Stadium: Dinamo Arena; Referee: Robert Schörgenhofer (Austria)

6 August 2013 Second leg	Steaua București (Romania)	1–1 (3–1 agg.)	(Georgia (country)) Dinamo Tbilisi	Bucharest, Romania
20:45	Latovlevici 6'	Report	Ustaritz 48'	Stadium: Arena Națională; Referee: Kristinn Jakobsson (Iceland)

===== Play-off round =====
21 August 2013 First leg	Steaua București (Romania)	1–1	(Poland) Legia Warsaw	Bucharest, Romania
21:45	Piovaccari 34'	Report	Kosecki 53'	Stadium: Arena Națională; Referee: Nicola Rizzoli (Italy)

27 August 2013 Second leg	Legia Warsaw (Poland)	2–2 (3–3 a agg.)	(Romania) Steaua București	Warsaw, Poland
21:45	Radović 27'; Rzeźniczak 90+4'	Report	7' Stanciu; 9' Piovaccari	Stadium: Pepsi Arena; Referee: Pedro Proença (Portugal)

==== Group stage ====
Group E standings
Pos	Team	Pld	W	D	L	GF	GA	GD	Pts	Qualification	CHE	SCH	BSL	STE
1	(England) Chelsea	6	4	0	2	12	3	+9	12	Advance to knockout phase	—	3–0	1–2	1–0
2	(Germany) Schalke 04	6	3	1	2	6	6	0	10	Advance to knockout phase	0–3	—	2–0	3–0
3	(Switzerland) Basel	6	2	2	2	5	6	−1	8	Transfer to Europa League	1–0	0–1	—	1–1
4	(Romania) Steaua București	6	0	3	3	2	10	−8	3		0–4	0–0	1–1	—

Source: UEFA

===== Results =====
18 September 2013 Matchday 1	Schalke 04 (Germany)	3–0	(Romania) Steaua București	Gelsenkirchen, Germany
21:45	Uchida 67'; Boateng 78'; Draxler 85'	Report		Stadium: Veltins-Arena; Attendance: 49,358; Referee: Cüneyt Çakır (Turkey); Man of the Match: Kevin-Prince Boateng

1 October 2013 Matchday 2	Steaua București (Romania)	0–4	(England) Chelsea	Bucharest, Romania
21:45		Report	Ramires 20', 55'; Georgievski 44' (o.g.); Lampard 90'	Stadium: Arena Națională; Attendance: 36,713; Referee: Carlos Velasco Carballo (Spain); Man of the Match: André Schürrle

22 October 2013 Matchday 3	Steaua București (Romania)	1–1	(Switzerland) Basel	Bucharest, Romania
21:45	Leandro Tatu 88'	Report	Díaz 48'	Stadium: Arena Națională; Attendance: 23,899; Referee: Matej Jug (Slovenia); Man of the Match: Marcelo Díaz

6 November 2013 Matchday 4	Basel (Switzerland)	1–1	(Romania) Steaua București	Basel, Switzerland
21:45	Sio 90+1'	Report	Piovaccari 17'	Stadium: St. Jakob-Park; Attendance: 30,704; Referee: Olegário Benquerença (Portugal); Man of the Match: Alexandru Bourceanu

26 November 2013 Matchday 5	Steaua București (Romania)	0–0	(Germany) Schalke 04	Bucharest, Romania
21:45		Report		Stadium: Arena Națională; Referee: Bas Nijhuis (Netherlands); Man of the Match: Jermaine Jones

11 December 2013 Matchday 6	Chelsea (England)	1–0	(Romania) Steaua București	London, England
21:45	Ba 10'	Report		Stadium: Stamford Bridge; Referee: Gianluca Rocchi (Italy); Man of the Match: Willian

=== Non competitive matches ===
Date	Team	Results			Steaua scorers
Date	Team	Home	Away	Neutral	Steaua scorers
22 June 2013	(Russia) Rubin Kazan			0–0	
25 June 2013	(Hungary) Videoton			0–1	
30 June 2013	(Scotland) Livingston			4–1	M. Costea 37', 56', Iancu 43', Jones 47' (o.g.)
2 July 2013	(England) Notts County			2–0	Latovlevici 4', M. Costea 61'
6 July 2013	(England) Sheffield Wednesday			1–1	Ad. Popa 20'
11 October 2013	(Ukraine) Shakhtar Donetsk			1–4	M. Costea 66'
14 January 2014	(Germany) 1. FC Nürnberg			1–5	Neagu 74'
16 January 2014	(Germany) Werder Bremen			0–0	
18 January 2014	(Switzerland) Luzern			0–1	
20 January 2014	(Germany) Union Berlin			1–1	Piovaccari 49'
22 January 2014	(Azerbaijan) Baku			0–2	
28 January 2014	(Ukraine) Dynamo Kyiv			0–0	
30 January 2014	(Sweden) IFK Göteborg			0–0	
1 February 2014	(Bulgaria) Lokomotiv Plovdiv			1–2	Chipciu 2'
3 February 2014	(Poland) Korona Kielce			3–1	Gardoș 21', Piovaccari 45', Stanciu 69'
5 February 2014	(Sweden) Elfsborg			0–0	
19 March 2014	(Romania) Clinceni			2–1	Iancu 16', Răduț 25'

== See also ==
- 2013–14 Cupa României
- 2013–14 Liga I
- 2013–14 UEFA Champions League
