= 2014–15 FC Steaua București season =

Steaua București
2014–15 season
- Owner: George Becali
- President: Valeriu Argăseală
- Head coach: Constantin Gâlcă
- Stadium: Stadionul Steaua; Arena Națională
- Liga I: 1st (champions)
- Cupa României: Winners
- Cupa Ligii: Winners
- Supercupa României: Runners-up
- Champions League: Play-off round
- Europa League: Group stage
- Top goalscorer: League: Claudiu Keșerü (12); All: Claudiu Keșerü (19)
- Highest home attendance: 43,000 (approximate) vs Dinamo București (31 October 2014)
- Lowest home attendance: 0 (close doors) vs Universitatea Craiova (2 August 2014) vs Pandurii Târgu Jiu (15 August 2014) vs Brașov (22 November 2014)
- Average home league attendance: 6,177
Home colours	Away colours

The 2014–15 season was the 67th season in the existence of FC Steaua București and the club's 67th consecutive season in the top flight of Romanian football. In addition to the domestic league, Steaua București participated in this season's edition of the Cupa României, the Cupa Ligii, the Supercupa României, the UEFA Champions League and the UEFA Europa League.

== Players ==
=== First-team squad ===
Note: Flags indicate national team as defined under FIFA eligibility rules; some limited exceptions apply. Players may hold more than one non-FIFA nationality.

No.	Pos.	Nation	Player
1	GK	ROU	Florin Niță
2	DF	ROU	Cornel Râpă
5	DF	ROU	Srdjan Luchin
6	DF	ROU	Paul Papp
7	MF	ROU	Alexandru Chipciu
8	MF	ROU	Lucian Filip
9	FW	ROU	Gabriel Iancu
10	MF	ROU	Cristian Tănase (captain)
11	MF	ROU	Andrei Prepeliță (vince-captain)
12	MF	ROU	Nicolae Stanciu
13	DF	ROU	Alin Toșca
14	DF	ROU	Iasmin Latovlevici
16	DF	BRA	Guilherme Sityá

No.	Pos.	Nation	Player
17	MF	ROU	Florentin Pham-Huy
21	MF	NED	Nicandro Breeveld
24	GK	LTU	Giedrius Arlauskis
25	FW	ROU	Raul Rusescu (on loan from Sevilla)
26	MF	ROU	Ionuț Neagu
29	FW	ROU	George Țucudean (on loan from Charlton Athletic)
30	DF	ROU	Gabriel Tamaș
33	DF	CPV	Fernando Varela
55	MF	ROU	Alexandru Bourceanu (on loan from Trabzonspor)
77	MF	ROU	Adrian Popa
94	MF	ROU	Rareș Enceanu
95	GK	ROU	Valentin Cojocaru
97	MF	ROU	Robert Vâlceanu

==== Players from youth team ====
Note: Flags indicate national team as defined under FIFA eligibility rules; some limited exceptions apply. Players may hold more than one non-FIFA nationality.

No.	Pos.	Nation	Player
—	DF	ROU	Alexandru Nicola
—	MF	ROU	Costin Constantinescu
—	MF	ROU	Robert Gavrilă
—	FW	ROU	Junior Măcriș

=== Transfers ===
==== In ====
No.	Pos.	Nat.	Name	Age	EU	Moving from	Type	Transfer window	Ends	Transfer fee	Source
—	DF	(Romania)	Valeriu Lupu	23	EU	Săgeata Năvodari	Loan return	Summer	Undisclosed	—	
—	MF	(Romania)	Mihai Onicaș	24	EU	Târgu Mureș	Loan return	Summer	2014	—	
—	MF	(Romania)	Cristian Pușcaș	20	EU	Clinceni	Loan return	Summer	Undisclosed	—	
—	MF	(Romania)	Iulian Roșu	20	EU	Clinceni	Loan return	Summer	Undisclosed	—	
13	DF	(Romania)	Alin Toșca	22	EU	Viitorul Constanța	Transfer	Summer	Undisclosed	Undisclosed	
24	GK	(Lithuania)	Giedrius Arlauskis	26	EU	Rubin Kazan (Russia)	Free transfer	Summer	Undisclosed	Free	SteauaFC.com
17	MF	(Romania)	Florentin Pham-Huy	17	EU	Juventus București	Free transfer	Summer	Undisclosed	Free	SteauaFC.com
19	FW	(Romania)	Valentin Lemnaru	30	EU	Universitatea Cluj	Transfer	Summer	2016	Undisclosed	SteauaFC.com
5	DF	(Romania)	Srdjan Luchin	28	EU	Botev Plovdiv (Bulgaria)	Transfer	Summer	2016	Undisclosed	SteauaFC.com
21	MF	(Netherlands) (Suriname)	Nicandro Breeveld	27	EU	Pandurii Târgu Jiu	Transfer	Summer	Undisclosed	Undisclosed	SteauaFC.com
6	DF	(Romania)	Paul Papp	24	EU	Chievo (Italy)	Loan with transfer option	Summer	2015	Undisclosed	SteauaFC.com
55	MF	(Romania)	Alexandru Bourceanu	29	EU	Trabzonspor (Turkey)	Loan	Summer	2015	Undisclosed	SteauaFC.com
25	FW	(Romania)	Raul Rusescu	26	EU	Sevilla (Spain)	Loan with transfer option	Summer	2015	Undisclosed	SteauaFC.com
6	DF	(Romania)	Paul Papp	25	EU	Chievo (Italy)	Transfer option activated	Winter	2020	Undisclosed	SteauaFC.com
94	MF	(Romania)	Rareș Enceanu	20	EU	Brașov	Transfer	Winter	2019	Undisclosed	SteauaFC.com
30	DF	(Romania)	Gabriel Tamaș	31	EU	Watford (England)	Free transfer	Winter	2017	Free	SteauaFC.com
29	FW	(Romania)	George Țucudean	23	EU	Charlton Athletic (England)	Loan with transfer option	Winter	2016	Undisclosed	SteauaFC.com
—	MF	(Romania)	Iulian Roșu	20	EU	Rapid București	Loan return	Winter	Undisclosed	—	
16	DF	(Portugal) (Brazil)	Guilherme Sityá	24	EU	SpVgg Greuther Fürth (Germany)	Free transfer	Winter	2020	Free	SteauaFC.com
—	MF	(Romania)	Alexandru Aldea (footballer)	19	EU	Fortuna Poiana Câmpina	Loan return	Winter	2019	—	

==== Out ====
No.	Pos.	Nat.	Name	Age	EU	Moving to	Type	Transfer window	Transfer fee	Source
—	MF	(Romania)	Mihai Onicaș	24	EU	Olimpia Satu Mare	End of contract	Summer	Free	
12	GK	(Romania)	Ciprian Tătărușanu	28	EU	Fiorentina (Italy)	End of contract	Summer	Free	SteauaFC.com
86	GK	(North Macedonia)	Martin Bogatinov	28	Non-EU	Ermis Aradippou (Cyprus)	End of contract	Summer	Free	
17	DF	(North Macedonia)	Daniel Georgievski	26	Non-EU	Melbourne Victory (Australia)	End of contract	Summer	Free	
35	FW	(Greece)	Pantelis Kapetanos	31	EU	Skoda Xanthi (Greece)	End of contract	Summer	Free	SkodaXanthiFC.gr
25	FW	(Italy)	Federico Piovaccari	29	EU	Sampdoria (Italy)	End of loan	Summer	Free	
5	MF	(Romania)	Mihai Pintilii	29	EU	Al-Hilal (Saudi Arabia)	Transfer	Summer	€2,500,000	SteauaFC.com
30	MF	(Romania)	Mihai Răduț	24	EU	Pandurii Târgu Jiu	Free transfer	Summer	Free	SteauaFC.com
29	FW	(Romania)	Alexandru Târnovan	18	EU	Gaz Metan Mediaș	Loan	Summer	Undisclosed	SteauaFC.com
—	MF	(Romania)	Iulian Roșu	20	EU	Rapid București	Loan	Summer	Undisclosed	
6	DF	(Romania)	Florin Gardoș	25	EU	Southampton (England)	Transfer	Summer	€6,800,000	SteauaFC.com
—	MF	(Romania)	Cristian Pușcaș	20	EU	Academica Argeș	Loan	Summer	Undisclosed	
—	DF	(Romania)	Valeriu Lupu	23	EU		Out of team	Summer	—	
35	MF	(Romania)	Alexandru Aldea (footballer)	19	EU	Fortuna Poiana Câmpina	Loan	Summer	Undisclosed	SteauaFC.com
27	MF	(Romania)	Răzvan Grădinaru	19	EU	Oțelul Galați	Loan	Summer	Undisclosed	SteauaFC.com
19	FW	(Romania)	Valentin Lemnaru	30	EU	Universitatea Cluj	Transfer	Summer	30% rights of Andreas Calcan	SteauaFC.com
22	DF	(Romania)	Paul Pârvulescu	26	EU	Viitorul Constanța	Loan	Winter	Undisclosed	SteauaFC.com
18	MF	(Romania)	Lucian Sânmărtean	34	EU	Al-Ittihad (Saudi Arabia)	Transfer	Winter	Undisclosed	SteauaFC.com
4	DF	(Germany) (Poland)	Łukasz Szukała	30	EU	Al-Ittihad (Saudi Arabia)	Transfer	Winter	Undisclosed	SteauaFC.com
16	DF	(Romania)	Gabriel Matei	24	EU	Brașov	Loan	Winter	Undisclosed	SteauaFC.com
—	MF	(Romania)	Iulian Roșu	20	EU	Astra Giurgiu	Mutual termination	Winter	Free	
—	MF	(Romania)	Alexandru Aldea (footballer)	19	EU	Ceahlăul Piatra Neamț	Loan	Winter	Undisclosed	
28	FW	(Romania)	Claudiu Keșerü	28	EU	Al Gharafa (Qatar)	Transfer	Winter	€2,400,000	SteauaFC.com

== Statistics ==
=== Goalscorers ===
Last updated on 31 May 2015 (UTC)

Player	Liga I	Cupa României	Cupa Ligii	Supercupa României	Champions League	Europa League	Total
(Romania) Claudiu Keșerü	12	0	2	0	1	4	19
(Romania) Raul Rusescu	4	2	2	0	0	5	13
(Romania) Nicolae Stanciu	6	1	0	0	2	0	9
(Romania) Gabriel Iancu	3	4	1	0	1	0	9
(Romania) Adrian Popa	5	3	0	0	0	0	8
(Romania) Alexandru Chipciu	3	1	1	1	2	0	8
(Romania) Cristian Tănase	5	1	1	0	0	0	7
(Romania) Andrei Prepeliță	5	0	0	0	1	0	6
(Romania) George Țucudean	3	0	2	0	0	0	5
(Poland) Łukasz Szukała	4	0	0	0	0	0	4
(Romania) Lucian Sânmărtean	3	0	0	0	0	1	4
(Cape Verde) Fernando Varela	3	0	0	0	0	0	3
(Romania) Paul Papp	2	0	0	0	0	0	2
(Romania) Iasmin Latovlevici	1	0	0	0	0	0	1
(Romania) Alin Toșca	0	0	1	0	0	0	1
(Netherlands) Nicandro Breeveld	0	0	1	0	0	0	1
(Romania) Cornel Râpă	0	0	0	0	1	0	1
(Romania) Lucian Filip	0	0	0	0	0	1	1

== Competitions ==
=== Supercupa României ===
==== Results ====
11 July 2014 Final	Steaua București	1–1 (a.e.t.) (3–5 p)	Astra Giurgiu	Bucharest
21:00 EET (UTC+02)	Chipciu 45'		Enache 74'	Stadium: Arena Națională; Referee: Alexandru Tudor; Assistant referees: Mircea Grigoriu, Alexandru Cerei; Fourth official: Daniel Mitruți; Goal-line assistants: Robert Dumitru, Marcel Bârsan
	Penalties
	Keșerü (penalty scored); Filip (penalty missed); Pârvulescu (penalty scored); Latovlevici (penalty scored)		Găman (penalty scored); Seto (penalty scored); Morais (penalty scored); Laban (penalty scored); Budescu (penalty scored)

=== Liga I ===
==== League table ====
Pos	Team	Pld	W	D	L	GF	GA	GD	Pts	Qualification or relegation
1	Steaua București (C)	34	22	5	7	59	23	+36	71	Qualification for the Champions League second qualifying round
2	Târgu Mureș	34	20	8	6	51	25	+26	68	Qualification for the Europa League third qualifying round
3	CFR Cluj (Note: CFR Cluj were initially deducted 24 points due to financial reasons, but the decision was adjourned by Court of Arbitration for Sport until the conclusion of the insolvency proceedings. CFR Cluj were not eligible to play in Europe as they did not obtain an UEFA license because they filed for insolvency.) (I)	34	16	9	9	46	29	+17	57 (Note: CFR Cluj ahead on head-to-head record; CFR Cluj–Astra Giurgiu 4–1, Astra Giurgiu–CFR Cluj 0–1)	Not granted a license for UEFA Competitions
4	Astra Giurgiu	34	15	12	7	53	27	+26	57	Qualification for the Europa League second qualifying round (Note: The Romanian Cup finalist Universitatea Cluj filed for insolvency, and the other one is Steaua București, so the European spot meant for cup winner will be filled up by the 3rd eligible team from the Liga I and the spot for the third-placed team will be given to the 4th eligible team from the Liga I.)
5	Universitatea Craiova (Note: Teams who have not been given a UEFA license (Brașov, Ceahlăul Piatra Neamț, CFR Cluj, Concordia Chiajna, Universitatea Craiova, Dinamo București, Oțelul Galați, Petrolul Ploiești, Rapid București and Universitatea Cluj) were not eligible to play in European competitions. Petrolul Ploiești, Dinamo București, Rapid București, FC Brașov, Universitatea Cluj and CFR Cluj were not eligible to play in Europe because they filed for insolvency and Universitatea Craiova was not eligible because it was affiliated in 2013.) (I)	34	14	11	9	40	34	+6	53	Not granted a license for UEFA Competitions

Source: Liga I (in Romanian) UEFA.com (in English)
Rules for classification: 1) points; 2) head-to-head results; 3) goal difference; 4) number of goals scored
(C) Champions; (I) Unable to qualify for UEFA Competitions

==== Results summary ====
Overall								Home						Away					
Pld	W	D	L	GF	GA	GD	Pts	W	D	L	GF	GA	GD	W	D	L	GF	GA	GD
34	22	5	7	59	23	+36	71	10	2	5	32	12	+20	12	3	2	27	11	+16

Source: LT

==== Position by round ====
Round	1	2	3	4	5	6	7	8	9	10	11	12	13	14	15	16	17	18	19	20	21	22	23	24	25	26	27	28	29	30	31	32	33	34
Ground	A	H	A	H	H	A	H	A	H	A	H	A	H	A	H	A	H	H	A	H	A	A	H	A	H	A	H	A	H	A	H	A	H	A
Result	W	W	W	W	L	W	W	W	D	W	W	L	W	W	W	W	W	L	D	W	L	W	W	W	L	D	L	W	L	W	D	W	W	D
Position	4	3	2	1	2	2	1	1	1	1	1	1	1	1	1	1	1	1	1	1	1	1	1	1	1	1	1	1	2	2	2	2	1	1

Source: Matches
A = Away; H = Home; W = Win; D = Draw; L = Loss

==== Matches ====
26 July 2014 Round 1	Rapid București	1–3	Steaua București	Bucharest
21:00 EET (UTC+02)	Pancu 23'		Keșerü 27'; Popa 66'; Chipciu 72'	Stadium: Giulești-Valentin Stănescu; Attendance: 3,000 (approximate); Referee: Alexandru Tudor; Assistant referees: Valentin Avram, Mircea Orbuleț; Fourth official: Andrei Chivulete

2 August 2014 Round 2	Steaua București	3–1	Universitatea Craiova	Bucharest
21:00 EET (UTC+02)	Popa 4'; Sânmărtean 34'; Varela 90+3'		Ivan 90+4'	Stadium: Steaua; Attendance: 0 (close doors); Referee: Adrian Cojocaru; Assistant referees: Miklós Nagy, Adrian Mărginean; Fourth official: Horațiu Feșnic

10 August 2014 Round 3	CFR Cluj	0–1	Steaua București	Cluj-Napoca
21:00 EET (UTC+02)			Tănase 15'	Stadium: Dr. Constantin Rădulescu; Attendance: 8,000 (approximate); Referee: Ovidiu Hațegan; Assistant referees: Sebastian Gheorghe, Vladimir Urzică; Fourth official: Florin Marcu

15 August 2014 Round 4	Steaua București	6–0	Pandurii Târgu Jiu	Bucharest
21:00 EET (UTC+02)	Keșerü 23', 26', 34', 64', 82', 85'			Stadium: Steaua; Attendance: 0 (close doors); Referee: Sebastian Colțescu; Assistant referees: Florin Păunescu, Daniel Mitruți; Fourth official: Adrian Illyeș

23 August 2014 Round 5	Steaua București	0–1	Ceahlăul Piatra Neamț	Bucharest
21:00 EET (UTC+02)			Achim 48'	Stadium: Steaua; Attendance: 3,500 (approximate); Referee: Lucian Rusandu; Assistant referees: Alexandru Cerei, Stelian Slabu; Fourth official: Teodor Crăciunescu

30 August 2014 Round 6	Viitorul Constanța	0–1	Steaua București	Chiajna
21:00 EET (UTC+02)			Iancu 51' (pen.)	Stadium: Concordia; Attendance: 1,200 (approximate); Referee: Radu Petrescu; Assistant referees: Bucsi Imre-László, Adrian Ionescu; Fourth official: Marian Balaci

12 September 2014 Round 7	Steaua București	3–1	Gaz Metan Mediaș	Bucharest
21:00 EET (UTC+02)	Keșerü 12', 62'; Sânmărtean 49'		Llullaku 69'	Stadium: Steaua; Attendance: 4,500 (approximate); Referee: Robert Dumitru; Assistant referees: Marius Marchidanu, Adrian Popescu; Fourth official: Andrei Chivulete

21 September 2014 Round 8	Petrolul Ploiești	2–3	Steaua București	Ploiești
21:00 EET (UTC+02)	Tamuz 28', 59'		Chipciu 14'; Keșerü 17'; Varela 73'	Stadium: Ilie Oană; Attendance: 13,500 (approximate); Referee: Cristian Balaj; Assistant referees: Sebastian Gheorghe, Ovidiu Artene; Fourth official: Iulian Călin

28 September 2014 Round 9	Steaua București	0–0	Astra Giurgiu	Bucharest
21:00 EET (UTC+02)				Stadium: Steaua; Attendance: 10,000 (approximate); Referee: Ovidiu Hațegan; Assistant referees: Daniel Mitruți, Marius Nicoară; Fourth official: Florin Miron

5 October 2014 Round 10	Oțelul Galați	0–3	Steaua București	Galați
16:00 EET (UTC+02)			Latovlevici 21'; Sânmărtean 23'; Szukała 63'	Stadium: Oțelul; Attendance: 8,000 (approximate); Referee: Cătălin Popa; Assistant referees: Aurel Oniță, Andrei Constantinescu; Fourth official: Adrian Illyeș

19 October 2014 Round 11	Steaua București	4–1	Universitatea Cluj	Bucharest
21:00 EET (UTC+02)	Papp 12'; Szukała 31'; Popa 65'; Keșerü 74'		Bucșa 59'	Stadium: Steaua; Attendance: 4,533; Referee: Alexandru Tudor; Assistant referees: Stelian Slabu, Adrian Păunescu; Fourth official: Dan Botescu

26 October 2014 Round 12	Târgu Mureș	1–0	Steaua București	Târgu Mureș
20:00 EET (UTC+02)	Axente 55'			Stadium: Trans-Sil; Attendance: 8,000 (approximate); Referee: István Kovács; Assistant referees: Miklós Nagy, Alexandru Cerei; Fourth official: Denis Haidiner

31 October 2014 Round 13	Steaua București	3–0	Dinamo București	Bucharest
20:30 EET (UTC+02)	Szukała 45+3'; Papp 78'; Keșerü 80'			Stadium: Arena Națională; Attendance: 43,000 (approximate); Referee: Cristian Balaj; Assistant referees: Sebastian Gheorghe, Vasile Marinescu; Fourth official: Dragoș Istrate

9 November 2014 Round 14	Concordia Chiajna	0–1	Steaua București	Chiajna
20:00 EET (UTC+02)			Tănase 15'	Stadium: Concordia; Attendance: 4,500 (approximate); Referee: Sebastian Colțescu; Assistant referees: Marius Nicoară, Valentin Avram; Fourth official: Bogdan Anghelinei

22 November 2014 Round 15	Steaua București	2–0	Brașov	Bucharest
20:30 EET (UTC+02)	Popa 46'; Chipciu 78'			Stadium: Steaua; Attendance: 0 (close doors); Referee: Radu Petrescu; Assistant referees: Alexandru Vodă, Vladimir Urzică; Fourth official: Marcel Bârsan

1 December 2014 Round 16	Botoșani	0–2	Steaua București	Botoșani
20:30 EET (UTC+02)			Prepeliță 31', 88'	Stadium: Municipal; Attendance: 7,000 (approximate); Referee: Marius Avram; Assistant referees: Radu Ghinguleac, Andrei Constantinescu; Fourth official: Ionuț Coza

7 December 2014 Round 17	Steaua București	1–0	Studențesc Iași	Bucharest
18:00 EET (UTC+02)	Szukała 90+4'			Stadium: Steaua; Attendance: 2,000 (approximate); Referee: Iulian Calin; Assistant referees: Octavian Șovre, Ciprian Danșa; Fourth official: Marian Balaci

22 February 2015 Round 18	Steaua București	0–1	Rapid București	Bucharest
20:30 EET (UTC+02)			Gecov 60'	Stadium: Steaua; Attendance: 9,437; Referee: Cristian Balaj; Assistant referees: Sebastian Gheorghe, Radu Ghinguleac; Fourth official: Stelian Slabu; Goal-line assistants: Marian Balaci, George Rădulescu

1 March 2015 Round 19	Universitatea Craiova	0–0	Steaua București	Craiova
15:30 EET (UTC+02)				Stadium: Extensiv; Attendance: 6,000 (approximate); Referee: Marius Avram; Assistant referees: Ovidiu Artene, Vladimir Urzică; Fourth official: Bucsi Imre-László; Goal-line assistants: Robert Dumitru, Horațiu Feșnic

8 March 2015 Round 20	Steaua București	1–0	CFR Cluj	Bucharest
20:30 EET (UTC+02)	Țucudean 78'			Stadium: Steaua; Attendance: 3,500 (approximate); Referee: Andrei Chivulete; Assistant referees: Mircea Orbuleț, Sebastian Stoianov; Fourth official: Vladimir Urzică; Goal-line assistants: Adrian Cojocaru, Florin Miron

15 March 2015 Round 21	Pandurii Târgu Jiu	3–1	Steaua București	Târgu Jiu
20:30 EET (UTC+02)	Roman 38'; Shalaj 57'; Eric 90' (pen.)		Iancu 67'	Stadium: Tudor Vladimirescu; Attendance: 9,000 (approximate); Referee: Sebastian Colțescu; Assistant referees: Valentin Avram, Vladimir Urzică; Fourth official: Dragoș Iliescu; Goal-line assistants: Adrian Comănescu, Viorel Flueran

18 March 2015 Round 22	Ceahlăul Piatra Neamț	0–1	Steaua București	Piatra Neamț
19:30 EET (UTC+02)			Rusescu 16'	Stadium: Ceahlăul; Attendance: 2,000 (approximate); Referee: Marcel Bârsan; Assistant referees: Sebastian Gheorghe, Marius Bobe; Fourth official: Dan Botescu

22 March 2015 Round 23	Steaua București	4–1	Viitorul Constanța	Bucharest
20:00 EET (UTC+02)	Tănase 28', 81'; Rusescu 79'; Țucudean 88'		Bonilla 7'	Stadium: Steaua; Attendance: 2,000 (approximate); Referee: Adrian Comănescu; Assistant referees: Florin Păunescu, Marius Badea; Fourth official: Ovidiu Oprea

5 April 2015 Round 24	Gaz Metan Mediaș	1–2	Steaua București	Mediaş
20:30 EET (UTC+02)	Roman 20'		Prepeliță 11'; Popa 52'	Stadium: Gaz Metan; Attendance: 5,500 (approximate); Referee: Cătălin Popa; Assistant referees: Gabriel Bârjac, Iulius Timar; Fourth official: Ovidiu Oprea

9 April 2015 Round 25	Steaua București	0–1	Petrolul Ploiești	Bucharest
21:30 EET (UTC+02)			Nepomuceno 90'	Stadium: Arena Națională; Attendance: 5,020; Referee: Radu Petrescu; Assistant referees: Octavian Șovre, Mircea Orbuleț; Fourth official: Bogdan Velicu; Goal-line assistants: Adrian Cojocaru, Dragoș Istrate

12 April 2015 Round 26	Astra Giurgiu	0–0	Steaua București	Giurgiu
19:30 EET (UTC+02)				Stadium: Marin Anastasovici; Attendance: 4,320 (approximate); Referee: Sebastian Colțescu; Assistant referees: Vasile Marinescu, Alexandru Cerei; Fourth official: Daniel Mitruți; Goal-line assistants: Denis Haidiner, Viorel Flueran

19 April 2015 Round 27	Steaua București	1–2	Oțelul Galați	Bucharest
20:30 EET (UTC+02)	Țucudean 77'		Latovlevici 19' (o.g.); Hamroun 45'	Stadium: Arena Națională; Attendance: 2,500 (approximate); Referee: Robert Dumitru; Assistant referees: Dragoș Iliescu, Bucsi Imre-László; Fourth official: Marian Pană

25 April 2015 Round 28	Universitatea Cluj	0–3	Steaua București	Cluj-Napoca
21:00 EET (UTC+02)			Stanciu 14', 72'; Prepeliță 84'	Stadium: Cluj Arena; Attendance: 14,031; Referee: Marius Avram; Assistant referees: Sebastian Gheorghe, Vladimir Urzică; Fourth official: Daniel Mitruți; Goal-line assistants: Paul Unimatan, Florin Marcu

29 April 2015 Round 29	Steaua București	0–1	Târgu Mureș	Bucharest
21:30 EET (UTC+02)			Zicu 37'	Stadium: Arena Națională; Attendance: 15,369; Referee: George Găman; Assistant referees: Octavian Șovre, Mircea Grigoriu; Fourth official: Aurel Oniță; Goal-line assistants: Marcel Bârsan, George Rădulescu

3 May 2015 Round 30	Dinamo București	1–3	Steaua București	Bucharest
21:00 EET (UTC+02)	Elhamed 90+16'		Stanciu 76' (pen.), 79'; Prepeliță 90+23' (pen.)	Stadium: Arena Națională; Attendance: 25,863; Referee: Cristian Balaj; Assistant referees: Valentin Avram, Alexandru Cerei; Fourth official: Daniel Mitruți; Goal-line assistants: Cătălin Popa, Adrian Cojocaru

10 May 2015 Round 31	Steaua București	2–2	Concordia Chiajna	Bucharest
21:00 EET (UTC+02)	Stanciu 29' (pen.); Iancu 73'		Boldrin 54' (pen.), 63'	Stadium: Arena Națională; Attendance: 4,000 (approximate); Referee: Sebastian Colțescu; Assistant referees: Marius Nicoară, Bogdan Gheorghe; Fourth official: Gabriel Stroe; Goal-line assistants: Horațiu Feșnic, Iulian Călin

16 May 2015 Round 32	Brașov	2–3	Steaua București	Brașov
18:30 EET (UTC+02)	Toșca 9' (o.g.); Țîră 29'		Tănase 16'; Rusescu 69', 77'	Stadium: Silviu Ploeșteanu; Attendance: 6,000 (approximate); Referee: Alexandru Tudor; Assistant referees: Aurel Oniță, Radu Ghinguleac; Fourth official: George Neacșu; Goal-line assistants: Dragoș Istrate, Cătălin Popa

24 May 2015 Round 33	Steaua București	2–0	Botoșani	Bucharest
21:00EET (UTC+02)	Varela 23'; Stanciu 43'			Stadium: Arena Națională; Attendance: 3,000 (approximate); Referee: Marius Avram; Assistant referees: Bogdan Gheorghe, Florin Păunescu; Fourth official: Marius Marica; Goal-line assistants: Adrian Cojocaru, Ionuț Coza

28 May 2015 Round 34	Studențesc Iași	0–0	Steaua București	Iași
20:00 EET (UTC+02)				Stadium: Emil Alexandrescu; Attendance: 11,000 (approximate); Referee: Cristian Balaj; Assistant referees: Ovidiu Artene, Marius Marchidanu; Fourth official: Gabriel Bârjac; Goal-line assistants: Adrian Illyeș, Florin Mazilu

=== Cupa României ===
==== Results ====
25 September 2014 Round of 32	Berceni	0–3	Steaua București	Berceni
20:30 EET (UTC+02)			Iancu 75', 90', 90+3'	Stadium: Berceni; Referee: Marius Avram

28 October 2014 Round of 16	Studențesc Iași	0–1	Steaua București	Iași
20:00 EET (UTC+02)			Stanciu 89'	Stadium: Emil Alexandrescu; Referee: Horațiu Feșnic; Assistant referees: Ovidiu Artene, Iulius Timar; Fourth official: Marius Omuț; Man of the Match: Stanciu

4 December 2014 Quarter-finals	Universitatea Craiova	0–1	Steaua București	Craiova
20:30 EET (UTC+02)			Rusescu 69' (pen.)	Stadium: Ion Oblemenco; Referee: Alexandru Tudor; Assistant referees: Mircea Orbuleț, Alexandru Cerei; Fourth official: Adrian Comănescu

5 March 2015 Semi-finals first leg	Petrolul Ploiești	1–1	Steaua București	Ploiești
21:30 EET (UTC+02)	Tchité 22'		Chipciu 90+4'	Stadium: Ilie Oană; Attendance: 7,500 (approximate); Referee: Adrian Comănescu; Assistant referees: Octavian Șovre, Vasile Marinescu; Fourth official: Iulius Timar; Goal-line assistants: Radu Petrescu, Marian Balaci; Man of the Match: Chipciu

2 April 2015 Semi-finals second leg	Steaua București	3–1 (4–2 agg.)	Petrolul Ploiești	Bucharest
21:30 EET (UTC+02)	Popa 21'; Iancu 32'; Tănase 69'		Ipša 70'	Stadium: Arena Națională; Attendance: 14,206; Referee: George Găman; Assistant referees: Radu Ghinguleac, Ciprian Danșa; Fourth official: Sebastian Stoianov; Goal-line assistants: Robert Dumitru, Iulian Călin

31 May 2015 Final	Universitatea Cluj	0–3	Steaua București	Bucharest
21:00 EET (UTC+02)			Popa 9', 53'; Rusescu 48'	Stadium: Arena Națională; Attendance: 37,764; Referee: Alexandru Tudor; Assistant referees: Valentin Avram, Vladimir Urzică; Fourth official: Ciprian Danșa; Goal-line assistants: George Găman, Iulian Călin; Man of the Match: Popa

=== Cupa Ligii ===
==== Results ====
19 July 2014 Round of 16	Rapid București	1–2	Steaua București	Bucharest
21:00 EET (UTC+02)	Selagea 24'		Keșerü 8', 49' (pen.)	Stadium: Giulești-Valentin Stănescu; Referee: Adrian Cojocaru; Assistant referees: Marius Marchidanu, George Neacșu; Fourth official: Denis Haidiner

14 December 2014 Quarter-finals	Studențesc Iași	0–3	Steaua București	Iași
20:00 EET (UTC+02)			Breeveld 13'; Rusescu 29'; Toșca 64'	Stadium: Emil Alexandrescu; Referee: Robert Dumitru; Assistant referees: Valentin Avram, Marius Badea; Fourth official: Adrian Illyeș

18 February 2015 Semi-finals first leg	Steaua București	3–0	Astra Giurgiu	Bucharest
19:00 EET (UTC+02)	Tănase 4'; Țucudean 33'; Rusescu 86'			Stadium: Steaua; Attendance: 4,189; Referee: Radu Petrescu; Assistant referees: Vasile Marinescu, Mircea Grigoroiu; Fourth official: Marcel Bârsan

11 March 2015 Semi-finals second leg	Astra Giurgiu	2–0 (2–3 agg.)	Steaua București	Giurgiu
19:00 EET (UTC+02)	Fatai 70'; Enache 90+3'			Stadium: Marin Anastasovici; Attendance: 2,000 (approximate); Referee: Alexandru Tudor; Assistant referees: Aurel Oniță, George Neacșu; Fourth official: Marcel Bârsan

20 May 2015 Final	Pandurii Târgu Jiu	0–3	Steaua București	Bucharest
20:00 EET (UTC+02)			Iancu 3' (pen.); Chipciu 54'; Țucudean 67'	Stadium: Arena Națională; Attendance: 15,560; Referee: Adrian Comănescu; Assistant referees: Radu Ghinguleac, Mircea Grigoriu; Fourth official: Alexandru Cerei; Goal-line assistants: Marcel Bârsan, Andrei Chivulete

=== UEFA Champions League ===
==== Qualifying rounds ====
===== Second qualifying round =====
16 July 2014 First leg	Strømsgodset (Norway)	0–1	(Romania) Steaua București	Drammen, Norway
20:30 EET (UTC+02)			Iancu 49'	Stadium: Marienlyst; Attendance: 5,056; Referee: Serdar Gözübüyük (Netherlands); Assistant referees: Dave Goossens, Patrick Langkamp; Fourth official: Jeroen Manschot

23 July 2014 Second leg	Steaua București (Romania)	2–0 (3–0 agg.)	(Norway) Strømsgodset	Bucharest, Romania
20:30 EET (UTC+02)	Râpă 72'; Stanciu 84'			Stadium: Arena Națională; Attendance: 18,043; Referee: Eitan Shemeulevitch (Israel); Assistant referees: Danny Krasikow, Nissan Davidy; Fourth official: Alon Yefet

===== Third qualifying round =====
30 July 2014 First leg	Aktobe (Kazakhstan)	2–2	(Romania) Steaua București	Aktobe, Kazakhstan
18:00 EET (UTC+02)	Korobkin 58'; Arzumanyan 88'		Keșerü 44'; Prepeliță 79'	Stadium: Aktobe Central; Attendance: 12,200; Referee: Hüseyin Göçek (Turkey); Assistant referees: Mustafa Eyisoy, Orkun Aktaş; Fourth official: Süleyman Abay

6 August 2014 Second leg	Steaua București (Romania)	2–1 (4–3 agg.)	(Kazakhstan) Aktobe	Bucharest, Romania
20:30 EET (UTC+02)	Chipciu 3'; Stanciu 39'		Kapadze 85'	Stadium: Arena Națională; Attendance: 24,386; Referee: Miroslav Zelinka (Czech Republic); Assistant referees: Antonin Kordula, Jan Paták; Fourth official: Zbynek Proske

===== Play-off round =====
19 August 2014 First leg	Steaua București (Romania)	1–0	(Bulgaria) Ludogorets Razgrad	Bucharest, Romania
21:45 EET (UTC+02)	Chipciu 88'			Stadium: Arena Națională; Attendance: 35,342; Referee: Felix Brych (Germany); Assistant referees: Mark Borsch, Markus Hacker; Fourth official: Tobias Christ

27 August 2014 Second leg	Ludogorets Razgrad (Bulgaria)	1–0 (a.e.t.) (1–1 agg.) (6–5 p)	(Romania) Steaua București	Sofia, Bulgaria
21:45 EET (UTC+02)	Wanderson 90'			Stadium: Vasil Levski National; Attendance: 16,995; Referee: Alberto Undiano Mallenco (Spain); Assistant referees: Roberto del Palomar, Juan Carlos Yuste; Fourth official: Pau Cebrián Devís
	Penalties
	Moți (penalty scored); Wanderson (penalty missed); Hamza (penalty scored); Caiçara (penalty scored); Marcelinho (penalty scored); Dyakov (penalty scored); Espinho (penalty scored)		(penalty scored) Keșerü; (penalty missed) Pârvulescu; (penalty scored) Szukała; (penalty scored) Popa; (penalty scored) Varela; (penalty scored) Prepeliță; (penalty missed) Râpă

=== UEFA Europa League ===
==== Group stage ====
Pos	Team	Pld	W	D	L	GF	GA	GD	Pts	Qualification	DYK	AAB	STE	RIO
1	(Ukraine) Dynamo Kyiv	6	5	0	1	12	4	+8	15	Advance to knockout phase	—	2–0	3–1	2–0
2	(Denmark) AaB	6	3	0	3	5	10	−5	9	Advance to knockout phase	3–0	—	1–0	1–0
3	(Romania) Steaua București	6	2	1	3	11	9	+2	7		0–2	6–0	—	2–1
4	(Portugal) Rio Ave	6	1	1	4	5	10	−5	4		0–3	2–0	2–2	—

Source: Soccerway
Rules for classification: Group stage tiebreakers

===== Results =====
18 September 2014 Round 1	Steaua București (Romania)	6–0	(Denmark) AaB	Bucharest, Romania
22:05 EET (UTC+02)	Sânmărtean 51'; Rusescu 58' (pen.), 73'; Keșerü 61', 65', 72'			Stadium: Arena Națională; Referee: Vladislav Bezborodov (Russia); Assistant referees: Nikolai Golubev, Maksim Gavrilin; Fourth official: Valeri Danchenko

2 October 2014 Round 2	Dynamo Kyiv (Ukraine)	3–1	(Romania) Steaua București	Kyiv, Ukraine
20:00 EET (UTC+02)	Yarmolenko 40'; Kravets 66'; Teodorczyk 90+1'		Rusescu 89'	Stadium: NSC Olimpiyskiy; Referee: Robert Schörgenhofer (Austria); Assistant referees: Matthias Winsauer, Roland Brandner; Fourth official: Richard Huebler

23 October 2014 Round 3	Steaua București (Romania)	2–1	(Portugal) Rio Ave	Bucharest, Romania
20:00 EET (UTC+02)	Rusescu 17', 45'		Del Valle 48'	Stadium: Arena Națională; Referee: Simon Lee Evans (Wales); Assistant referees: Philip Thomas, Edward King; Fourth official: John Bryn Roberts

6 November 2014 Round 4	Rio Ave (Portugal)	2–2	(Romania) Steaua București	Vila do Conde, Portugal
22:05 EET (UTC+02)	Lopes 35', 77'		Keșerü 60'; Filip 90+4'	Stadium: Rio Ave; Attendance: 3,000 (approximate); Referee: Marcin Borski (Poland); Assistant referees: Rafal Rostkowski, Tomasz Listkiewicz; Fourth official: Krzysztof Myrmus

27 November 2014 Round 5	AaB (Denmark)	1–0	(Romania) Steaua București	Aalborg, Denmark
20:00 EET (UTC+02)	Enevoldsen 72'			Stadium: Nordjyske; Referee: Felix Zwayer (Germany); Assistant referees: Guido Kleve, Markus Häcker; Fourth official: Frank Willenborg

11 December 2014 Round 6	Steaua București (Romania)	0–2	(Ukraine) Dynamo Kyiv	Bucharest, Romania
22:05 EET (UTC+02)			Yarmolenko 71'; Lens 90+4'	Stadium: Arena Națională; Referee: Michael Oliver (England); Assistant referees: Stuart Burt, Darren England; Fourth official: John Brooks

=== Non competitive matches ===
Date	Team	Results			Steaua scorers
Date	Team	Home	Away	Neutral	Steaua scorers
23 June 2014	(Switzerland) Chiasso			1–2	Pârvulescu 14'
25 June 2014	(Switzerland) Lugano			2–5	Keșerü 64', 80'
1 July 2014	(Bulgaria) Ludogorets Razgrad			2–4	Grădinaru 81', Iancu 85' (pen.)
5 July 2014	(England) Oldham Athletic			4–1	Vâlceanu 32', Varela 67', Chipciu 69', Iancu 71'
7 July 2014	(Cyprus) AEL Limassol			1–1	Sânmărtean 18'
17 January 2015	(Germany) Borussia Dortmund			0–1	
21 January 2015	(Switzerland) Biel-Bienne			2–0	Popa 48', Keșerü 58'
31 January 2015	(Austria) Sturm Graz			0–2	
3 February 2015	(Bulgaria) CSKA Sofia			1–0	Popa 45'
6 February 2015	(Czech Republic) Sparta Prague			3–0	Țucudean 35', 69', Stanciu 75'
8 February 2015	(Slovenia) Maribor			0–0	
28 March 2015	(Romania) Farul Constanța		2–1		Țucudean 33' (pen.), Stanciu 48'

== See also ==
- 2014 Supercupa României
- 2014–15 Cupa României
- 2014–15 Liga I
- 2014–15 UEFA Champions League
- 2014–15 UEFA Europa League
