= Alexandru Aldea =

Alexandru Aldea may refer to:

- Alexander I Aldea (1397–1436), Prince of Wallachia
- Alexandru Aldea (footballer) (born 1995), Romanian footballer
