= Alexandru Chipciu =

Romanian footballer (born 1989)

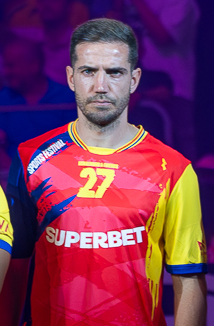
- Chipciu in 2025

Personal information
- Full name: Mihăiță Alexandru Chipciu
- Date of birth: 18 May 1989 (age 37)
- Place of birth: Brăila, Romania
- Height: 1.77 m (5 ft 10 in)
- Positions: Winger; full-back

Team information
- Current team: Universitatea Cluj
- Number: 27

Youth career
- 2001–2004: Dacia Unirea Brăila
- 2004–2006: Sporting Pitești

Senior career*
Years	Team	Apps	(Gls)
2006–2011	FC Brașov	76	(13)
2008	→ Forex Brașov (loan)	6	(0)
2009	→ CF Brăila (loan)	18	(4)
2011–2016	Steaua București	116	(24)
2016–2020	Anderlecht	49	(5)
2018–2019	→ Sparta Prague (loan)	27	(1)
2020–2022	CFR Cluj	62	(5)
2022–	Universitatea Cluj	154	(6)

International career^{‡}
2006	Romania U17	2	(1)
2008	Romania U19	2	(0)
2011–	Romania	50	(6)
- * Club domestic league appearances and goals as of 7 November 2026 ‡ National team caps and goals as of 15 November 2025

Mihăiță Alexandru Chipciu (Romanian pronunciation: [alekˈsandru kipˈt͡ʃi.u]; born 18 May 1989) is a Romanian professional footballer who plays for Liga I club Universitatea Cluj, which he captains, and the Romania national team. A versatile player, he is mainly deployed as a winger or an attacking midfielder, but has also been used as a false 9 or a wing-back on occasion.

After starting his senior career with FC Brașov, Chipciu moved to Steaua București in the winter of 2011 and won seven domestic trophies during his spell in the capital. In 2016, he transferred abroad for the first time to join Anderlecht; he helped to a national title in his first season in Belgium, but later fell out of favor and was sent on loan to Sparta Prague. At the start of 2020, Chipciu returned to his native country with defending champions CFR Cluj.

Chipciu is a Romanian international and has played for the country's under-17 and under-19 teams before making his senior debut in 2011. He was a member of the squad that participated at the UEFA Euro 2016.

== Club career ==
=== Early career ===
Chipciu started his career at hometown club Dacia Unirea Brăila in 2001, aged 13. From 2004 to 2006, he played youth football for Sporting Pitești.

=== FC Brașov ===
At the age of 18, Chipciu made his senior squad breakthrough at FC Brașov, scoring four goals in his first year with the club. However, he received less playing time as the team aimed promotion to the first division. For the first half of the 2008–09 campaign he was loaned out to Liga II side Forex Brașov, and in the second part he rejoined his former youth club Brăila in Liga III to accumulate more experience.

Upon his return to FC Brașov, now promoted to the Liga I, Chipciu again got few opportunities to play constantly. He however had appreciated performances in the 2010–11 season, being one of the best players of the team and attracting the attention of Bucharest rivals Steaua and Dinamo. He eventually chose to stay at Brașov, signing a new contract that would have kept him at the club until 2015. Chipciu had a great start to the 2011–12 season, scoring two important goals in the opening three games.

=== Steaua București ===
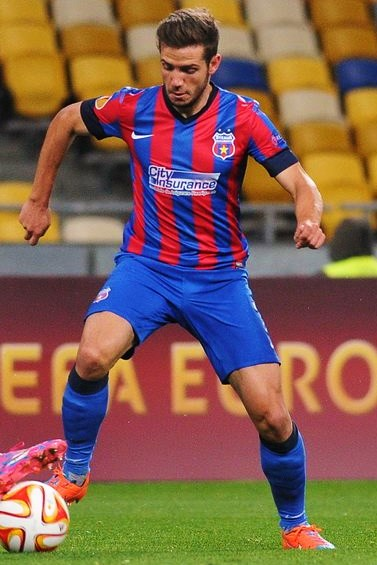
Chipciu playing against Dynamo Kyiv in the UEFA Europa League group stage, 2 October 2014.

On 21 December 2011, Steaua București announced that they reached an agreement with FC Brașov for the transfer of Chipciu. He penned a five-year contract, while press reported the transfer fee to be an initial €1.2 million plus 25% interest from a future sale.

Chipciu netted his first goal for the club in a 1–1 away draw at Pandurii Târgu Jiu on 31 March 2012, and his second came just one week later against Sportul Studențesc after an impressive build-up play (4–1 win, at Stadionul Steaua). On 7 May, he was sent off after receiving a red card in a match against Concordia Chiajna. During late 2012, Chipciu aided Steaua in qualifying from the UEFA Europa League group stage, where they played against VfB Stuttgart, Molde and Copenhagen. The following year, Steaua defeated Dutch club Ajax on penalty shoot-outs in the round of 32, before losing the next round to Chelsea after 3–2 on aggregate.

On 10 May 2013, in one of the last league fixtures of the season, Chipciu suffered an injury in a derby with Dinamo București and was subsequently sidelined for five months with a fractured tibia. Two weeks later, he received a winners medal after Steaua's Liga I conquest, being his first major honour. He earned six more trophies during his next three years with the Roș-albaștrii—two more league championships, one Cupa României, one Supercupa României, and two Cupa Ligii.

=== Anderlecht ===
On 18 July 2016, Chipciu traveled to Belgium to undergo a medical at Anderlecht. One day later, the club officially announced the signing of a four-year contract. Anderlecht paid €3 million for the transfer, with bonus clauses potentially rising the fee to €3.5 million.

On 7 August 2016, Chipciu scored his first goal in a 5–1 Belgian Pro League defeat of Kortrijk. After falling down the pecking order, Chipciu was sent on loan to Sparta Prague on 3 July 2018. During his one-year stint, he made 27 Czech First League appearances and netted once.

=== CFR Cluj ===
Chipciu returned to his native country on 18 January 2020, after agreeing to sign for CFR Cluj as a free agent. He played nine games without scoring in the remainder of the season, as CFR won its third-consecutive national title.

=== Universitatea Cluj ===
On 25 June 2022, Chipciu joined CFR's city rivals Universitatea Cluj on a one-year deal.

== International career ==
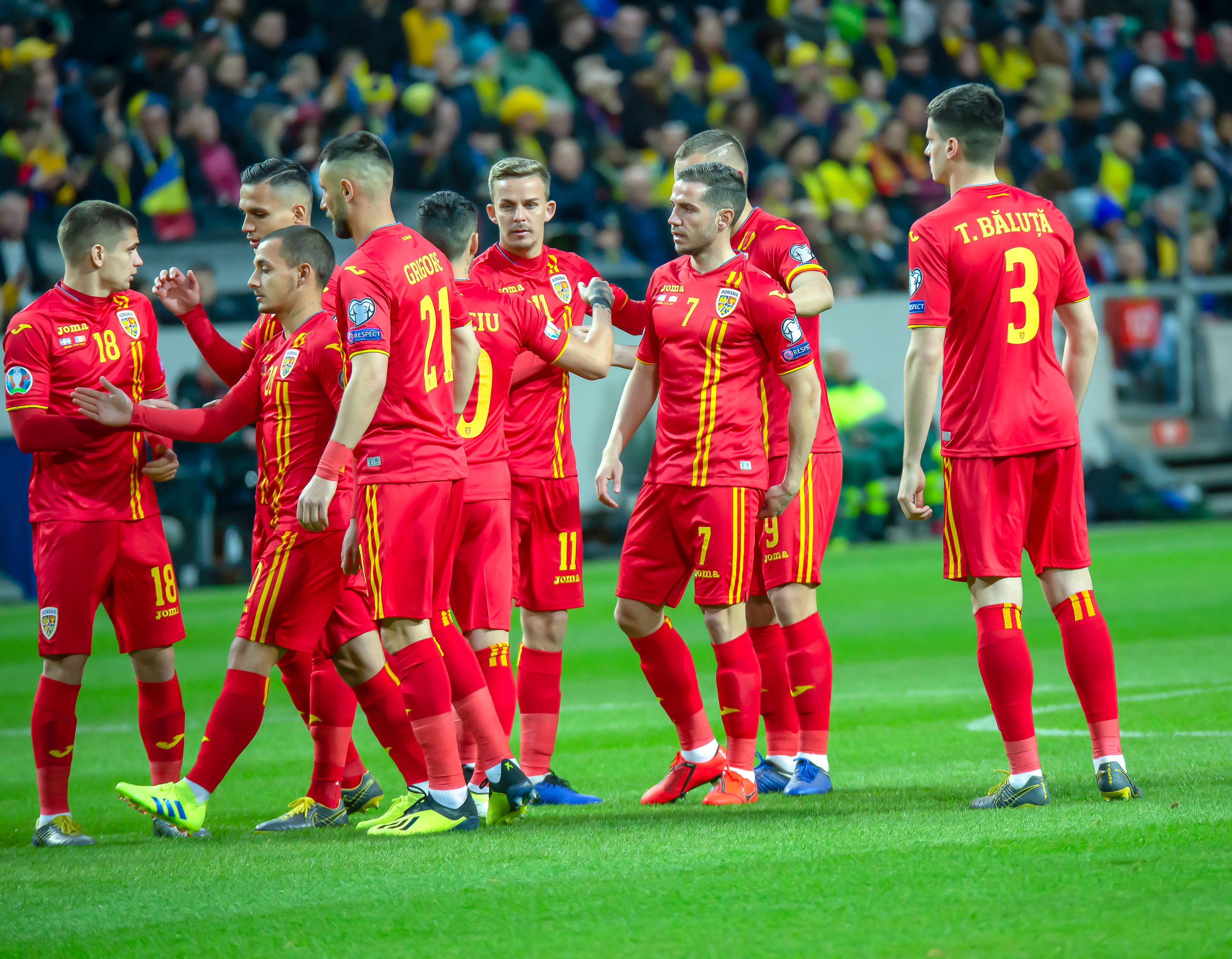
Chipciu (number 7) in a match against Sweden in 2019

On 29 March 2006, Chipciu made his debut for Romania under-17 in a match with Serbia. He also represented the country at under-19 level.

Chipciu gained his first cap for the full side in 2011, playing as a starter against San Marino. On 15 November that year, he scored his first senior international goal in a friendly match in Austria with Greece.

On 17 May 2016, Chipciu was picked by manager Anghel Iordănescu for his preliminary 28-man UEFA Euro 2016 squad and eventually made it to the final list.

== Career statistics ==
=== Club ===
As of match played 7 November 2026

Appearances and goals by club, season and competition
Club	Season	League			National cup (Note: Includes Cupa României, Belgian Cup, Czech Cup)		League cup (Note: Includes Cupa Ligii)		Europe		Other		Total	
Club	Season	Division	Apps	Goals	Apps	Goals	Apps	Goals	Apps	Goals	Apps	Goals	Apps	Goals
FC Brașov	2006–07	Liga II	15	4	0	0	—		—		—		15	4
FC Brașov	2007–08	Liga II	10	0	1	1	—		—		—		11	1
FC Brașov	2009–10	Liga I	2	1	0	0	—		—		—		2	1
FC Brașov	2010–11	Liga I	31	3	5	1	—		—		—		36	4
FC Brașov	2011–12	Liga I	18	5	2	0	—		—		—		20	5
FC Brașov	Total		76	13	8	2	—		—		—		84	15
Forex Brașov (loan)	2008–09	Liga II	6	0	0	0	—		—		—		6	0
CF Brăila (loan)	2008–09	Liga III	18	4	—		—		—		—		18	4
Steaua București	2011–12	Liga I	14	2	—		—		0	0	—		14	2
Steaua București	2012–13	Liga I	27	6	1	0	—		14 (Note: Appearances in UEFA Europa League)	2	—		42	8
Steaua București	2013–14	Liga I	22	6	4	1	—		3 (Note: Appearances in UEFA Champions League)	0	0	0	29	7
Steaua București	2014–15	Liga I	26	3	4	1	4	1	10 (Note: Five appearances and two goals in UEFA Champions League, five appearances in UEFA Europa League)	2	1 (Note: Appearances in Supercupa României)	1	45	8
Steaua București	2015–16	Liga I	27	7	4	1	1	1	6 (Note: Four appearances in UEFA Champions League, two appearances in UEFA Europa League)	0	1	0	39	9
Steaua București	Total		116	24	13	3	5	2	33	4	2	1	169	34
Anderlecht	2016–17	Belgian First Division A	32	5	2	0	—		14 (Note: Two appearances in UEFA Champions League, twelve appearances and one goal in UEFA Europa League)	1	—		48	6
Anderlecht	2017–18	Belgian First Division A	17	0	1	0	—		2	0	1 (Note: Appearance in Belgian Super Cup)	0	21	0
Anderlecht	2019–20	Belgian First Division A	0	0	0	0	—		—		—		0	0
Anderlecht	Total		49	5	3	0	—		16	1	1	0	69	6
Sparta Prague (loan)	2018–19	Czech First League	27	1	2	0	—		2	0	—		31	1
CFR Cluj	2019–20	Liga I	9	0	—		—		0	0	—		9	0
CFR Cluj	2020–21	Liga I	30	2	1	0	—		6 (Note: Two appearances in UEFA Champions League, four appearances in UEFA Europa League)	0	1	0	38	2
CFR Cluj	2021–22	Liga I	23	3	1	0	—		5 (Note: Four appearances and one goal in UEFA Champions League, one appearance in UEFA Europa League)	1	1	0	30	4
CFR Cluj	Total		62	5	2	0	—		11	1	2	0	77	6
Universitatea Cluj	2022–23	Liga I	34	1	5	1	—		—		—		39	2
Universitatea Cluj	2023–24	Liga I	34	5	5	1	—		—		2 (Note: Appearances in Liga I European play-offs)	0	41	6
Universitatea Cluj	2024–25	Liga I	36	0	0	0	—		—		—		36	0
Universitatea Cluj	2025–26	Liga I	36	0	5	0	—		2 (Note: Appearances in UEFA Conference League)	0	—		43	0
Universitatea Cluj	2026–27	Liga I	14	0	2	0	—		4 (Note: Two appearances in UEFA Europa League, two appearances in UEFA Conference League)	0	1	0	21	0
Universitatea Cluj	Total		154	6	17	2	—		6	0	3	0	180	8
Career total			508	58	45	7	5	2	68	6	8	1	633	74

=== International ===
As of match played 15 November 2025

Appearances and goals by national team and year
National team	Year	Apps	Goals
Romania	2011	2	1
Romania	2012	4	0
Romania	2013	2	1
Romania	2014	8	1
Romania	2015	3	0
Romania	2016	7	1
Romania	2017	6	0
Romania	2018	9	1
Romania	2019	5	1
Romania	2024	1	0
Romania	2025	3	0
Total		50	6

Scores and results list Romania's goal tally first, score column indicates score after each Chipciu goal.

List of international goals scored by Alexandru Chipciu
No.	Date	Venue	Cap	Opponent	Score	Result	Competition
1	15 November 2011	Stadion Schnabelholz, Altach, Austria	2	Greece	3–1	3–1	Friendly
2	22 March 2013	Ferenc Puskás, Budapest, Hungary	7	Hungary	2–2	2–2	2014 FIFA World Cup qualification
3	4 June 2014	Stade de Genève, Geneva, Switzerland	11	Algeria	1–1	1–2	Friendly
4	8 October 2016	Vazgen Sargsyan Republican Stadium, Yerevan, Armenia	24	Armenia	5–0	5–0	2018 FIFA World Cup qualification
5	11 October 2018	LFF Stadium, Vilnius, Lithuania	39	Lithuania	1–0	2–1	2018–19 UEFA Nations League C
6	10 June 2019	National Stadium, Ta' Qali, Malta	45	Malta	3–0	4–0	UEFA Euro 2020 qualification

== Honours ==
FC Brașov

- Liga II: 2007–08

Steaua București

- Liga I: 2012–13, 2013–14, 2014–15
- Cupa României: 2014–15
- Supercupa României: 2013
- Cupa Ligii: 2014–15, 2015–16

Anderlecht

- Belgian First Division A: 2016–17
- Belgian Super Cup: 2017

CFR Cluj

- Liga I: 2019–20, 2020–21, 2021–22
- Supercupa României: 2020

Universitatea Cluj

- Cupa României runner-up: 2022–23, 2025–26
- Supercupa României runner-up: 2026

Individual

- Liga I Player of the Month: March 2014
