= Fernando Varela (Cape Verdean footballer) =

Cape Verdean footballer (born 1987)

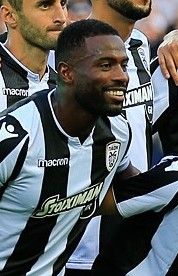
- Varela with PAOK in 2018

Personal information
- Full name: Fernando Lopes dos Santos Varela
- Date of birth: 26 November 1987 (age 38)
- Place of birth: Cascais, Portugal
- Height: 1.85 m (6 ft 1 in)
- Position: Centre-back

Youth career
- 1996–2004: AFD Torre
- 2004–2006: Estoril

Senior career*
Years	Team	Apps	(Gls)
2006–2009	Estoril	28	(1)
2006–2007	→ Rio Maior (loan)	21	(3)
2009–2011	Trofense	50	(2)
2011–2012	Feirense	30	(2)
2012–2013	Vaslui	37	(1)
2013–2016	Steaua București	82	(10)
2016–2022	PAOK	144	(6)
2022–2024	Casa Pia	51	(1)
2024–2025	Alverca	33	(3)
Total		476	(29)

International career
2008–2019	Cape Verde	51	(3)
- * Club domestic league appearances and goals

Fernando Lopes dos Santos Varela (born 26 November 1987) is a former professional footballer who played mainly as a centre-back. Born in Portugal, he represented Cape Verde internationally.

== Club career ==
=== Portugal ===
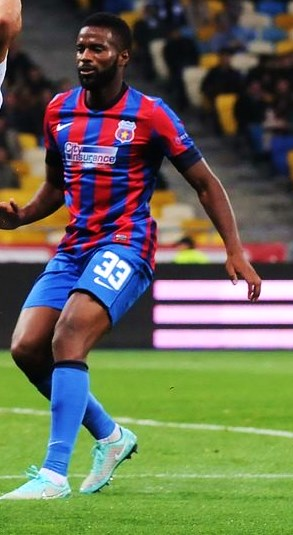
Varela with Steaua București in 2014

Born in Cascais, Varela started playing professionally with G.D. Estoril Praia in the Segunda Liga, being loaned to lowly U.D. Rio Maior for one year during his spell. In January 2009, he moved to C.D. Trofense as the northern club was playing for the first time in the Primeira Liga; he managed to appear regularly during the season, but they were relegated.

In the summer of 2011, after two additional second-tier seasons with Trofense, Varela signed for C.D. Feirense, returned to the top flight after a 22-year absence. In the following campaign, he took part in all league games as a starter, notably scoring twice against S.L. Benfica on 28 January 2012 (one in his own net) in a 2–1 loss where he also committed a penalty, and his team would again drop down a division.

=== Romania ===
Varela signed a three-year contract with Romanian side FC Vaslui on 29 May 2012. On 3 September of the following year, he joined FC Steaua București also from Liga I, agreeing to a three-year deal for a €1.25 million transfer fee.

At the end of 2014–15, Málaga CF showed interest in acquiring Varela, but Steaua rejected the Spaniards' €6 million offer. He appeared in 47 matches in all competitions as the double was won.

=== PAOK ===
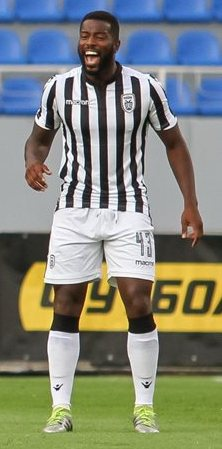
Varela playing with PAOK in 2016

On 23 July 2016, Varela, who had less than six months left on his contract, moved to the Super League Greece with PAOK FC for three years and a €1.4 million fee. He scored his first goal of the 2017–18 season on 12 February 2018, heading home in a 3–0 win against Athlitiki Enosi Larissa F.C. at the Toumba Stadium.

On 21 May 2019, Varela declined the club's offer to renew his link. One week later, however, he agreed to extend it until June 2022.

=== Casa Pia ===
The 34-year-old Varela went back to Portugal on 8 July 2022 after a decade away, on a deal at top-division Casa Pia AC. He went to score twice from 60 appearances, his first goal coming on 20 November that year in a 1–1 draw away to F.C. Paços de Ferreira in the group stage of the Taça da Liga and the second the following 6 March to help the hosts defeat the same adversary 2–1 in the domestic league.

=== Alverca ===
On 3 July 2024, the free agent Varela signed with F.C. Alverca. On 16 May 2025, he scored in the 2–1 home victory over Portimonense S.C. from a corner kick as the club returned to the top tier 21 years later.

Varela announced his retirement in July 2025.

== International career ==
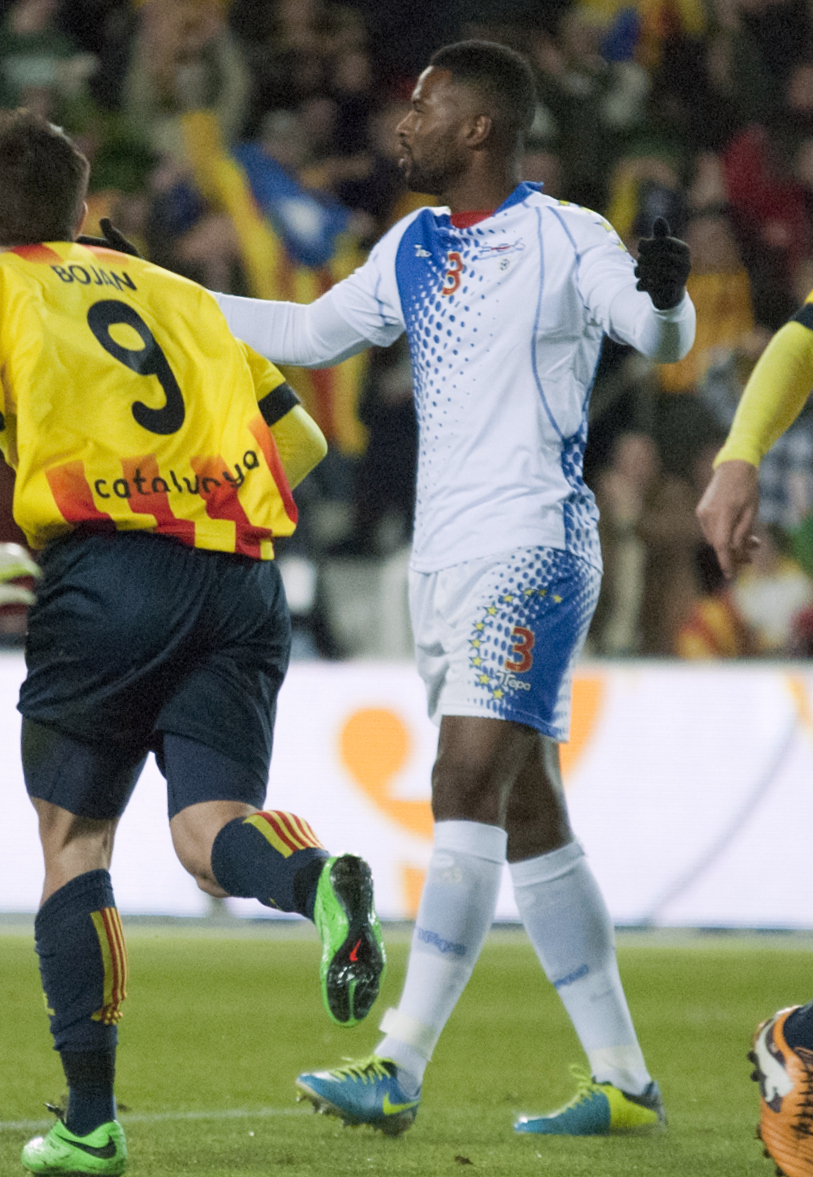
Varela with Cape Verde in December 2013

Portuguese-born, Varela opted to represent Cape Verde internationally, his debut coming in 2008. On 24 May 2010, he appeared in a friendly in Covilhã with Portugal – who were preparing for the FIFA World Cup in South Africa – playing the entire match as the minnows (ranked 117th) managed a 0–0 draw.

The Blue Sharks were disqualified from the 2014 World Cup when it was revealed that Varela had played in a qualifying match against Tunisia, despite not completing a four-match suspension for a red card he had received against Equatorial Guinea on 24 March 2013. That game was later rendered invalid by FIFA as a result of Equatorial Guinea fielding ineligible Emilio Nsue, but Varela's disciplinary record stood.

== Personal life ==
Varela's son, Gustavo, is also a professional footballer.

== Career statistics ==
=== Club ===
As of 17 May 2024

Club performance			League		National Cup		League Cup		Continental		Other		Total	
Club	Season	League	Apps	Goals	Apps	Goals	Apps	Goals	Apps	Goals	Apps	Goals	Apps	Goals
Rio Maior (loan)	2006–07	Segunda Divisão	21	3	2	0	–		–		–		23	3
Estoril	2005–06	Segunda Liga	0	0	1	0	–		–		–		1	0
Estoril	2007–08	Segunda Liga	17	0	1	0	1	0	–		–		19	0
Estoril	2008–09	Segunda Liga	11	1	2	0	4	1	–		–		17	2
Estoril	Total		28	1	4	0	5	1	–		–		37	2
Trofense	2008–09	Primeira Liga	11	1	0	0	–		–		–		11	1
Trofense	2009–10	Primeira Liga	12	0	0	0	1	0	–		–		13	0
Trofense	2010–11	Primeira Liga	27	1	1	0	0	0	–		–		28	1
Trofense	Total		50	2	1	0	1	0	–		–		52	2
Feirense	2011–12	Primeira Liga	30	2	1	0	2	1	–		–		33	3
Vaslui	2012–13	Liga I	32	1	0	0	–		4	1	–		36	2
Vaslui	2013–14	Liga I	5	0	0	0	–		–		–		5	0
Vaslui	Total		37	1	0	0	–		4	1	–		41	2
Steaua București	2013–14	Liga I	23	4	6	1	–		2	0	–		31	5
Steaua București	2014–15	Liga I	30	3	3	0	2	0	11	0	1	0	47	3
Steaua București	2015–16	Liga I	29	3	4	0	1	0	5	1	1	0	40	4
Steaua București	Total		82	10	13	1	3	0	18	1	2	0	118	12
PAOK	2016–17	Super League Greece	24	1	7	0	–		8	0	–		39	1
PAOK	2017–18	Super League Greece	26	1	6	0	–		4	0	–		36	1
PAOK	2018–19	Super League Greece	27	2	4	0	–		12	1	–		43	3
PAOK	2019–20	Super League Greece	28	1	5	1	–		4	0	–		37	2
PAOK	2020–21	Super League Greece	23	1	3	0	–		10	1	–		36	2
PAOK	2021–22	Super League Greece	16	0	0	0	–		6	0	–		22	0
PAOK	Total		144	6	25	1	–		44	2	–		213	9
Casa Pia	2022–23	Primeira Liga	27	1	1	0	3	1	–		–		31	2
Casa Pia	2023–24	Primeira Liga	24	0	2	0	3	0	–		–		29	0
Casa Pia	Total		51	1	3	0	6	1	–		–		60	2
Career total			443	26	49	2	17	3	66	4	2	0	577	35

=== International goals ===
#	Date	Venue	Opponent	Score	Result	Competition
1.	4 September 2010	Várzea, Praia, Cape Verde	Mali	1–0	Win	2012 Africa Cup of Nations qualification
2.	29 February 2012	Mahamasina Municipal Stadium, Antananarivo, Madagascar	Madagascar	4–0	Win	2013 Africa Cup of Nations qualification
3.	27 January 2013	Nelson Mandela, Port Elizabeth, South Africa	Angola	2–1	Win	2013 Africa Cup of Nations

== Honours ==
Steaua București

- Liga I: 2013–14, 2014–15
- Cupa României: 2014–15
- Cupa Ligii: 2014–15, 2015–16

PAOK

- Super League Greece: 2018–19
- Greek Football Cup: 2016–17, 2017–18, 2018–19, 2020–21

Individual

- Foreign Player of the Year in Romania (Gazeta Sporturilor): 2015
- Super League Greece Team of the Season: 2017–18, 2018–19
