= Florin Niță =

Romanian footballer (born 1987)

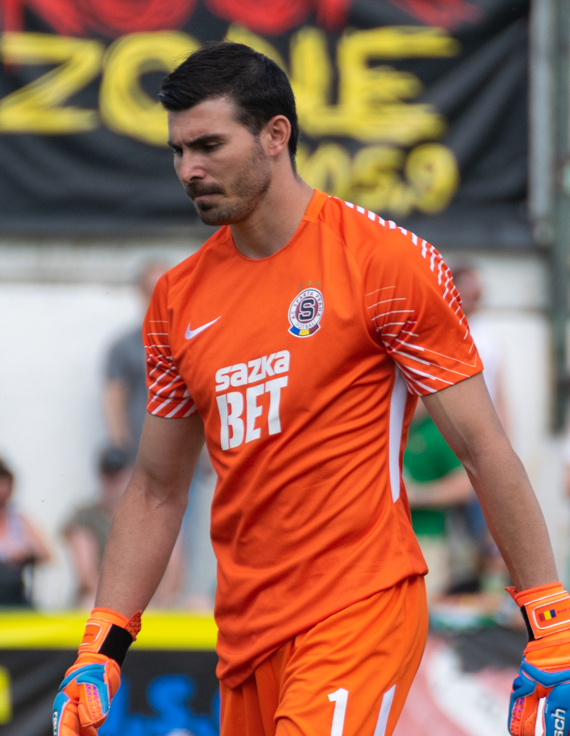
- Niță with Sparta Prague in 2018

Personal information
- Full name: Florin Constantin Niță
- Date of birth: 3 July 1987 (age 39)
- Place of birth: Bucharest, Romania
- Height: 1.84 m (6 ft 0 in)
- Position: Goalkeeper

Youth career
- 1994–2001: Steaua București
- 2001–2005: Rapid București
- 2005–2006: Astra Ploiești

Senior career*
Years	Team	Apps	(Gls)
2006–2013	Concordia Chiajna	117	(0)
2013–2018	FCSB	87	(0)
2018–2023	Sparta Prague	92	(0)
2023	→ Pardubice (loan)	17	(0)
2023–2024	Gaziantep	34	(0)
2024–2025	Damac	31	(0)
Total		378	(0)

International career
2017–2025	Romania	31	(0)
- * Club domestic league appearances and goals

Florin Constantin Niță (Romanian pronunciation: [floˈrin konstanˈtin ˈnitsə]; born 3 July 1987) is a Romanian former professional footballer who played as a goalkeeper.

Niță started his senior career at Concordia Chiajna, before signing for Steaua București in 2013. He won six honours during his spell with the capital-based team, and at the start of 2018 earned a transfer abroad to Sparta Prague. Following a loan at Pardubice, he signed for Süper Lig side Gaziantep in 2023.

Niță recorded his debut for the Romania national team in November 2017, in a 2–0 friendly win over Turkey. He was selected for the UEFA Euro 2024, where his country topped its group and reached the round of 16.

== Club career ==
=== Early career and Concordia Chiajna ===
Born in Bucharest, Niță started playing football at the age of seven with Steaua București. In 2001, he moved to local rivals Rapid București, where he stayed for four years. He then spent his last season as a junior at Astra Ploiești.

In 2006, aged 19, Niță joined Concordia Chiajna and played his first senior matches in the Liga III, the third level of the Romanian league system. He made his Liga I debut for the team on 25 July 2011, in a 1–2 home loss to Sportul Studențesc.

=== Steaua București ===
In December 2012, it was announced that Niță would return to his boyhood club Steaua București in the summer of the following year.

He started to appear frequently for the Roș-albaștrii in the 2015–16 season, in which he recorded 32 matches in all competitions. On 16 August 2016, Niță saved one of the two penalty kicks missed by Sergio Agüero in the 0–5 UEFA Champions League play-off loss to Manchester City.

In May 2017, he agreed to a new deal at the team, now named FCSB, which would have kept him in Bucharest until 2021. Niță's performances in 2017 earned him third place in Gazeta Sporturilor's Romanian Footballer of the Year award, which he shared with Ștefan Radu.

=== Sparta Prague ===
Niță transferred to Czech team Sparta Prague on 1 February 2018 for an undisclosed fee, rumoured to be in the region of €2 million plus €500,000 in bonuses.

In December 2021, he was named the Romanian Footballer of the Year by both the CSJ Association and the Gazeta Sporturilor daily for his performances throughout the calendar year. After falling down the pecking order, Sparta Prague loaned Niță out to fellow league side Pardubice for the remainder of the 2022–23 season.

=== Gaziantep ===
On 9 September 2023, Niță signed a one-year contract with Turkish club Gaziantep, joining several compatriots including manager Marius Șumudică. He was the first-choice goalkeeper during the campaign, and amassed eight clean sheets in the Süper Lig as his team finished eleventh in the table.

=== Damac ===
On 25 August 2024, Niță signed a one-year deal with Damac.

On 11 June 2026, he announced his professional retirement.

== International career ==
On 18 March 2017, following the injury of Silviu Lung Jr., Niță was picked by manager Christoph Daum in Romania's squad for a 2018 FIFA World Cup qualifier against Denmark. Days before his call-up, former Romanian internationals Helmut Duckadam, Gheorghe Hagi, and Laurențiu Reghecampf stated that his omissal from the squad was "unjust".

Niță made his debut for the full side on 9 November 2017, entering as a 71st-minute substitute for Costel Pantilimon in a 2–0 friendly win over Turkey in Cluj-Napoca. After Ciprian Tătărușanu announced his retirement from the national team at the end of 2020, Niță played the full 90 minutes in all three 2022 World Cup qualifying matches against North Macedonia, Germany, and Armenia in March 2021. Romania lost against the latter two opponents, but his saves were praised by media and fans alike.

On 7 June 2024, Niță was named in the squad for Euro 2024. Although he did not feature in the qualifiers, he started in all four matches his country played during the final tournament. Romania topped their group but were subsequently eliminated by the Netherlands in the round of 16.

== Career statistics ==
=== Club ===
As of match played 22 May 2025

Appearances and goals by club, season and competition
Club	Season	League			National cup (Note: Includes Cupa României, Czech Cup, Turkish Cup)		League cup (Note: Includes Cupa Ligii)		Continental		Total	
Club	Season	Division	Apps	Goals	Apps	Goals	Apps	Goals	Apps	Goals	Apps	Goals
Concordia Chiajna	2007–08	Liga II	7	0			—		—		7	0
Concordia Chiajna	2008–09	Liga II	15	0			—		—		15	0
Concordia Chiajna	2009–10	Liga II	29	0			—		—		29	0
Concordia Chiajna	2010–11	Liga II	27	0	0	0	—		—		27	0
Concordia Chiajna	2011–12	Liga I	21	0	0	0	—		—		21	0
Concordia Chiajna	2012–13	Liga I	18	0	2	0	—		—		20	0
Concordia Chiajna	Total		117	0	2	0	—		—		119	0
FCSB	2013–14	Liga I	5	0	3	0	—		0	0	8	0
FCSB	2014–15	Liga I	3	0	1	0	2	0	0	0	6	0
FCSB	2015–16	Liga I	29	0	1	0	1	0	1 (Note: Appearance(s) in UEFA Europa League)	0	32	0
FCSB	2016–17	Liga I	29	0	2	0	2	0	9 (Note: Three appearances in UEFA Champions League, six appearances in UEFA Europa League)	0	42	0
FCSB	2017–18	Liga I	21	0	0	0	—		8 (Note: Four appearances in UEFA Champions League, four appearances in UEFA Europa League)	0	29	0
FCSB	Total		87	0	7	0	5	0	18	0	117	0
Sparta Prague	2017–18	Czech First League	14	0	—		—		—		14	0
Sparta Prague	2018–19	Czech First League	26	0	0	0	—		2	0	28	0
Sparta Prague	2019–20	Czech First League	11	0	2	0	—		2	0	15	0
Sparta Prague	2020–21	Czech First League	26	0	1	0	—		3	0	30	0
Sparta Prague	2021–22	Czech First League	15	0	0	0	—		8 (Note: Four appearances in UEFA Champions League, four appearances in UEFA Europa League)	0	23	0
Sparta Prague	Total		92	0	3	0	—		15	0	110	0
Pardubice (loan)	2022–23	Czech First League	17	0	—		—		—		17	0
Gaziantep	2023–24	Süper Lig	34	0	1	0	—		—		35	0
Damac	2024–25	Saudi Pro League	31	0	0	0	—		—		31	0
Career total			378	0	13	0	5	0	33	0	429	0

=== International ===
As of match played 21 March 2025

Appearances and goals by national team and year
National team	Year	Apps	Goals
Romania	2017	1	0
Romania	2018	1	0
Romania	2021	11	0
Romania	2022	6	0
Romania	2024	11	0
Romania	2025	1	0
Total		31	0

== Honours ==
Steaua București

- Liga I: 2013–14, 2014–15
- Cupa României: 2014–15
- Cupa Ligii: 2014–15, 2015–16
- Supercupa României: 2013

Sparta Prague

- Czech First League: 2022–23
- Czech Cup: 2019–20

Individual

- Gazeta Sporturilor Romanian Footballer of the Year: 2021, third place: 2017 (shared with Ștefan Radu)
- CSJ Gala Fotbalului Românesc Romanian Footballer of the Year: 2021
- Liga I Best Goalkeeper: 2016–17 (shared with Branko Grahovac)
- Liga I Team of the Season: 2016–17
