= Ionuț Puțanu =

Romanian footballer

Personal information
- Full name: Ionuț Adrian Puțanu
- Date of birth: 9 January 1994 (age 32)
- Place of birth: Galați, Romania
- Height: 1.86 m (6 ft 1 in)
- Position: Center back

Team information
- Current team: 1.FC Alemannia Hamberg
- Number: 6

Youth career
- 2001–2009: Oțelul Galați
- 2009–2011: Gheorghe Hagi Academy

Senior career*
Years	Team	Apps	(Gls)
2011–2016	Viitorul Constanța	45	(2)
2015	→ Brașov (loan)	17	(2)
2016	Brașov	10	(0)
2016	Metalosport Galați		
2017	Nöttingen		
2018	CSMȘ Reșița	13	(1)
2018–2020	Oțelul Galați	23	(1)
2020–	1.FC Alemannia Hamberg	15	(2)

International career^{‡}
2010–2011	Romania U17	9	(0)
2011–2012	Romania U19	5	(1)
2013–2014	Romania U21	2	(0)
- * Club domestic league appearances and goals as of 29 September 2020 ‡ National team caps and goals as of 13 August 2014

Ionuț Adrian Puțanu (born 9 January 1994) is a Romanian footballer who plays as a centre back for German club 1.FC Alemannia Hamberg.
