= Cristian Tănase =

Romanian footballer (born 1987)

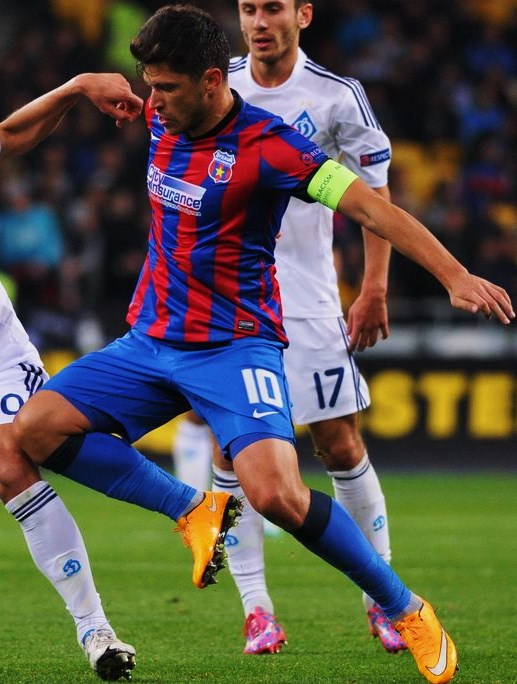
- Tănase with FCSB in 2014

Personal information
- Date of birth: 18 February 1987 (age 39)
- Place of birth: Pitești, Romania
- Height: 1.77 m (5 ft 10 in)
- Positions: Winger; attacking midfielder

Team information
- Current team: Inter Ilfov (assistant)

Youth career
- –2004: LPS Pitești

Senior career*
Years	Team	Apps	(Gls)
2003–2009	Argeș Pitești	105	(7)
2006	→ Dacia Mioveni (loan)	5	(0)
2009–2015	Steaua București	154	(20)
2015–2016	Tianjin TEDA	10	(2)
2016	Sivasspor	14	(0)
2016–2018	Karabükspor	43	(3)
2018	FCSB	8	(0)
2018	Eskişehirspor	0	(0)
2019–2020	Giresunspor	31	(1)
2020–2021	Academica Clinceni	26	(1)
2021–2022	Argeș Pitești	23	(3)
Total		419	(37)

International career
2005	Romania U19	3	(1)
2006–2008	Romania U21	7	(0)
2008–2015	Romania	41	(6)

Managerial career
- 2024–2025: Inter Ilfov (assistant)
- * Club domestic league appearances and goals

Cristian Tănase (Romanian pronunciation: [kristiˈan təˈnase]; born 18 February 1987) is a Romanian former professional footballer who played as a winger or an attacking midfielder.

Tănase spent most of his career in Romania with Argeș Pitești and Steaua București, winning seven domestic trophies with the latter, and also had several stints at clubs in China and Turkey.

Internationally, Tănase totalled 41 caps for the Romania national team between 2008 and 2015.

== Club career ==
=== Argeș Pitești ===
Tănase began his career as a junior at LPS Pitești, and in the summer of 2003 was promoted to the first team of Argeș Pitești, which competed in the Divizia A, the top flight of the Romanian league system. He appeared sparingly during his first years with the seniors and was subsequently loaned to Dacia Mioveni for the first half of the 2005–06 campaign.

Tănase totalled five games for Mioveni and upon his return to Argeș became an important player, amassing over 100 games before his departure.

=== Steaua București ===
On 6 August 2009, Tănase signed a five-year contract with Steaua București for an undisclosed fee, reported by media to be €1.8 million for half of his economic rights.

On 13 December 2009, he scored his first goal for Steaua, a 72nd-minute winner in a 3–2 defeat of Internațional Curtea de Argeș. In the 2010–11 season, Tănase scored three goals—two in the UEFA Europa League and one from a volley against Pandurii Târgu Jiu.

In the following season, he netted the goal against CSKA Sofia that qualified his team for the 2011–12 UEFA Europa League group stage. Tănase further contributed with two goals against Maccabi Haifa in that stage of the tournament.

During the 2014–15 campaign, his last at Steaua, Tănase was named team captain.

=== Late career ===
In the summer of 2015, after six years in Bucharest, Tănase joined Tianjin TEDA in China on a two-year contract for a transfer fee of £700,000. The next year, he moved to Turkish team Sivasspor by signing a two-year deal.

After half a season at Sivasspor, Tănase left for another Turkish club, agreeing to a two-year contract with Kardemir Karabükspor. In January 2018, he returned to FCSB, for a six-month spell with the Roș-albaștrii.

On 20 July 2018, it was announced that Tănase signed a two-year contract with Eskişehirspor.

== International career ==
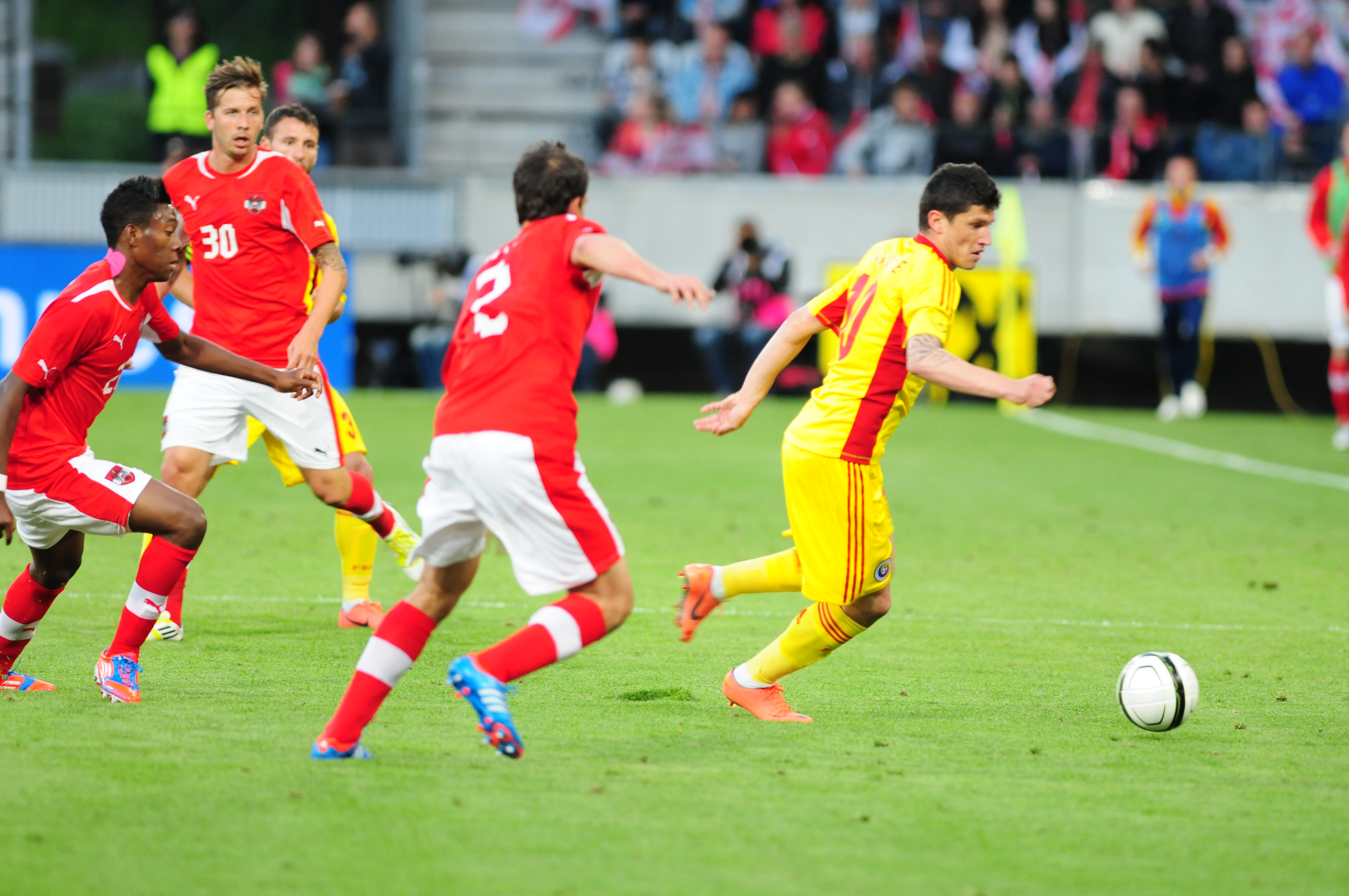
Tănase (in yellow) playing for Romania in a match against Austria, June 2012.

Tănase made his debut for the Romania national team in a 2–1 friendly win over Georgia, on 19 November 2008. On 1 April 2009, he scored his first goal in a 1–2 loss to Austria in the 2010 FIFA World Cup qualifiers.

On 27 January 2012, Tănase scored a double in a 4–0 exhibition thrashing of Turkmenistan.

== Career statistics ==
=== Club ===
Appearances and goals by club, season and competition
Club	Season	League			Cup		Continental		Other		Total	
Club	Season	Division	Apps	Goals	Apps	Goals	Apps	Goals	Apps	Goals	Apps	Goals
Argeș Pitești	2003–04	Divizia A	1	0	–		–		–		1	0
Argeș Pitești	2004–05	Divizia A	2	0	0	0	–		–		2	0
Argeș Pitești	2005–06	Divizia A	16	1	0	0	–		–		16	1
Argeș Pitești	2006–07	Liga I	25	0	1	0	–		–		26	0
Argeș Pitești	2007–08	Liga II	29	4	1	0	–		–		30	4
Argeș Pitești	2008–09	Liga I	32	2	0	0	–		–		32	2
Argeș Pitești	Total		105	7	2	0	0	0	0	0	107	7
Dacia Mioveni (loan)	2005–06	Divizia B	5	0	–		–		–		5	0
Steaua București	2009–10	Liga I	21	1	1	0	4 (Note: Appearances in UEFA Europa League)	0	–		26	1
Steaua București	2010–11	Liga I	27	1	4	0	7	2	–		38	3
Steaua București	2011–12	Liga I	30	4	1	0	9	3	1 (Note: Appearance in Supercupa României)	0	41	7
Steaua București	2012–13	Liga I	29	7	1	0	9	0	–		39	7
Steaua București	2013–14	Liga I	24	2	4	2	10 (Note: Appearances in UEFA Champions League)	1	1	0	39	5
Steaua București	2014–15	Liga I	23	5	2	1	10 (Note: Five appearances in UEFA Champions League, five appearances in UEFA Europa League)	0	3 (Note: Two appearances and one goal in Cupa Ligii, one appearance in Supercupa României)	1	38	7
Steaua București	Total		154	20	13	3	49	6	5	1	221	30
Tianjin TEDA	2015	Chinese Super League	10	2	0	0	–		–		10	2
Sivasspor	2015–16	Süper Lig	14	0	–		–		–		14	0
Karabükspor	2016–17	Süper Lig	29	3	0	0	–		–		29	3
Karabükspor	2017–18	Süper Lig	14	0	1	1	–		–		15	1
Karabükspor	Total		43	3	1	1	0	0	0	0	44	4
FCSB	2017–18	Liga I	8	0	0	0	1	0	–		9	0
Eskişehirspor	2018–19	TFF 1. Lig	0	0	0	0	–		–		0	0
Giresunspor	2018–19	TFF 1. Lig	12	0	–		–		–		12	0
Giresunspor	2019–20	TFF 1. Lig	19	1	1	0	–		–		20	1
Giresunspor	Total		31	1	1	0	0	0	0	0	32	1
Academica Clinceni	2020–21	Liga I	26	1	1	0	–		–		27	1
Argeș Pitești	2021–22	Liga I	23	3	2	0	–		–		25	3
Career total			419	37	20	4	50	6	5	1	494	48

=== International ===
Appearances and goals by national team and year
National team	Year	Apps	Goals
Romania	2008	1	0
Romania	2009	4	1
Romania	2010	4	0
Romania	2011	8	1
Romania	2012	8	2
Romania	2013	9	2
Romania	2014	6	0
Romania	2015	1	0
Total		41	6

Scores and results list Romania's goal tally first, score column indicates score after each Tănase goal.

List of international goals scored by Cristian Tănase
Goal	Date	Venue	Opponent	Score	Result	Competition
1	1 April 2009	Hypo-Arena, Klagenfurt, Austria	Austria	1–0	1–2	2010 FIFA World Cup qualification
2	15 November 2011	Stadion Schnabelholz, Altach, Austria	Greece	2–1	3–1	Friendly
3	27 January 2012	Belek Stadium, Belek, Turkey	Turkmenistan	2–0	4–0	Friendly
4	27 January 2012	Belek Stadium, Belek, Turkey	Turkmenistan	3–0	4–0	Friendly
5	6 February 2013	Estadio Ciudad de Málaga, Málaga, Spain	Australia	1–0	3–2	Friendly
6	6 September 2013	Arena Națională, Bucharest, Romania	Hungary	3–0	3–0	2014 FIFA World Cup qualification

== Honours ==
Argeș Pitești

- Liga II: 2007–08

Steaua București

- Liga I: 2012–13, 2013–14, 2014–15
- Cupa României: 2010–11, 2014–15
- Supercupa României: 2013
- Cupa Ligii: 2014–15
