= Alexandru Târnovan =

Romanian footballer

Personal information
- Date of birth: 27 July 1995 (age 31)
- Place of birth: Bistrița, Romania
- Height: 1.86 m (6 ft 1 in)
- Position: Striker

Youth career
- Sporting Bistrița
- LPS Bistrița
- 2010–2012: Academia Hagi
- 2013–2014: Steaua București U19

Senior career*
Years	Team	Apps	(Gls)
2012–2014	Viitorul Constanța	8	(0)
2013–2014	→ Steaua București (loan)	1	(0)
2014–2016	Steaua București	1	(0)
2014–2015	→ Gaz Metan Mediaș (loan)	7	(0)
2016	→ Universitatea Cluj (loan)	8	(0)
2016–2017	Botoșani	9	(2)
2018	Hermannstadt	1	(0)
Total		35	(2)

International career
2011–2013	Romania U17	3	(1)
2013–2014	Romania U19	3	(0)
- * Club domestic league appearances and goals

Alexandru Târnovan (born 27 July 1995) is a Romanian former professional footballer who played as a striker.

== Club career ==
=== Steaua București ===
On 31 December 2013, it was announced that Târnovan has signed for Steaua București in a deal worth €300k, with Viitorul Constanța club getting 20% on any future sales.

== Career statistics ==
Appearances and goals by club, season and competition
Club	Season	League			Cupa României		Cupa Ligii		Europe		Other		Total	
Club	Season	Division	Apps	Goals	Apps	Goals	Apps	Goals	Apps	Goals	Apps	Goals		
Viitorul Constanța	2012–13	Liga I	6	0	0	0	0	0	—		—		6	0
Viitorul Constanța	2013–14	Liga I	2	0	0	0	0	0	—		—		2	0
Viitorul Constanța	Total		8	0	0	0	—		—		0	0		
Steaua București (loan)	2013–14	Liga I	1	0	1	1	0	0	0	0	0	0	2	1
Gaz Metan Mediaș (loan)	2014–15	Liga I	7	0	0	0	0	0	—		—		7	0
Steaua București	2015–16	Liga I	1	0	1	0	1	0	0	0	0	0	3	0
Universitatea Cluj (loan)	2015–16	Liga II	8	0	0	0	—		—		—		8	0
Botoșani	2016–17	Liga I	6	2	1	0	—		—		—		7	2
Botoșani	2017–18	Liga I	3	0	1	0	—		—		—		4	0
Botoșani	Total		9	2	2	0	—		—		—		11	2
Hermannstadt	2017–18	Liga II	1	0	1	0	—		—		—		2	0
Career total			35	2	6	1	0	0	0	0	41	3		

== Honours ==
Steaua București

- Liga I: 2013–14
- Cupa Ligii: 2015–16

Hermannstadt

- Cupa României runner-up: 2017–18
