= Łukasz Szukała =

Polish footballer (born 1984)

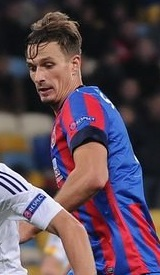
- Szukała with Steaua București in 2014

Personal information
- Full name: Łukasz Szukała
- Date of birth: 26 May 1984 (age 42)
- Place of birth: Gdańsk, Poland
- Height: 1.98 m (6 ft 6 in)
- Position: Centre-back

Team information
- Current team: FCSB (sporting director)

Youth career
- 1994–1997: TuS Fortuna Saarburg
- 1997–1998: SV Trassem
- 1998–2000: Eintracht Trier
- 2000–2003: Metz

Senior career*
| Years | Team | Apps | (Gls) |
| 2003–2004 | Metz B | 9 | (0) |
| 2004–2007 | 1860 Munich II | 51 | (4) |
| 2004–2008 | 1860 Munich | 44 | (0) |
| 2008–2010 | Alemannia Aachen | 26 | (2) |
| 2008 | Alemannia Aachen II | 1 | (0) |
| 2010–2011 | Gloria Bistrița | 28 | (2) |
| 2011–2012 | Universitatea Cluj | 29 | (0) |
| 2012 | Petrolul Ploiești | 2 | (1) |
| 2012–2015 | Steaua București | 65 | (12) |
| 2015 | Al-Ittihad | 12 | (3) |
| 2015–2017 | Osmanlıspor | 12 | (0) |
| 2017–2019 | Ankaragücü | 6 | (0) |
| Total | | 285 | (24) |

International career
| 2003 | Poland U19 | 3 | (0) |
| 2005 | Poland U21 | 3 | (0) |
| 2013–2015 | Poland | 17 | (1) |
- * Club domestic league appearances and goals

Łukasz Szukała (born 26 May 1984) is a Polish former professional footballer who played as a centre-back. He is currently the sporting director at Liga I club FCSB.

After starting out his career at Metz B in France, Szukała went on to compete professionally in Germany, Romania, Saudi Arabia and Turkey, respectively.

At international level, Szukała represented the Poland senior team between 2013 and 2015, earning 17 caps and one goal in the process.

== Club career ==
=== Universitatea Cluj ===
In June 2011, Szukała joined Universitatea Cluj on a three-year contract.

=== Steaua București ===
In August 2012, Łukasz signed with Romanian giants Steaua București. On 4 November 2012, Szukała scored his first goal for title-chasing Steaua in a 3–1 win against their Bucharest arch-rivals, Dinamo, guaranteeing him a good relationship with the very demanding Steaua fans. In 2014, he was voted as the best foreign footballer in Liga I.

=== Al Ittihad ===
On 3 January 2015, he signed a contract with Al-Ittihad, when he entered his final six months of the deal with Steaua. The two clubs reached an agreement to release the player before his contract with Steaua ended, thus he joined Al-Ittihad in January 2015.

== International career ==
Szukała made his first appearance for the Poland national football team against Denmark in 2013.

He scored his first goal for the national side in the 7–0 victory over Gibraltar.

== Personal life ==
Łukasz Szukała is a polyglot who speaks fluent Polish, English, French, German, and Romanian.

He also has a German citizenship. His parents emigrated to Germany during his early childhood. He grew up in the region of Trier.

Szukała is married to a sports news presenter from Romania, Raluca Hogyes, with whom he has a son (b. 2019). He lives in Bucharest with his family, where he owns a restaurant.

== Career statistics ==
=== Club ===
Appearances and goals by club, season and competition
| Club | Season | League | | | National cup (Note: Includes DFB-Pokal, Cupa României, King's Cup, Turkish Cup) | | League cup | | Continental | | Other | | Total | |
| Club | Season | Division | Apps | Goals | Apps | Goals | Apps | Goals | Apps | Goals | Apps | Goals | Apps | Goals |
|---|---|---|---|---|---|---|---|---|---|---|---|---|---|---|
| Metz B | 2003–04 | Championnat de France Amateur | 9 | 0 | — | | — | | — | | — | | 9 | 0 |
| 1860 Munich II | 2004–05 | Regionalliga Bayern | 16 | 1 | — | | — | | — | | — | | 16 | 1 |
| 1860 Munich II | 2005–06 | Regionalliga Bayern | 14 | 1 | — | | — | | — | | — | | 14 | 1 |
| 1860 Munich II | 2006–07 | Regionalliga Bayern | 14 | 1 | — | | — | | — | | — | | 14 | 1 |
| 1860 Munich II | 2007–08 | Regionalliga Bayern | 7 | 1 | — | | — | | — | | — | | 7 | 1 |
| 1860 Munich II | Total | | 51 | 4 | — | | — | | — | | — | | 51 | 4 |
| 1860 Munich | 2004–05 | 2. Bundesliga | 18 | 0 | 0 | 0 | — | | – | | — | | 18 | 0 |
| 1860 Munich | 2005–06 | 2. Bundesliga | 15 | 0 | 0 | 0 | — | | — | | — | | 15 | 0 |
| 1860 Munich | 2006–07 | 2. Bundesliga | 2 | 0 | 0 | 0 | — | | — | | — | | 2 | 0 |
| 1860 Munich | 2007–08 | 2. Bundesliga | 9 | 0 | 0 | 0 | — | | — | | — | | 9 | 0 |
| 1860 Munich | Total | | 44 | 0 | 0 | 0 | — | | — | | — | | 44 | 0 |
| Alemannia Aachen | 2008–09 | 2. Bundesliga | 18 | 2 | 2 | 0 | — | | — | | — | | 20 | 2 |
| Alemannia Aachen | 2009–10 | 2. Bundesliga | 8 | 0 | 2 | 1 | — | | — | | — | | 10 | 1 |
| Alemannia Aachen | Total | | 26 | 2 | 4 | 1 | — | | — | | — | | 30 | 3 |
| Alemannia Aachen II | 2008–09 | NRW-Liga | 1 | 0 | — | | — | | — | | — | | 1 | 0 |
| Gloria Bistrița | 2010–11 | Liga I | 28 | 2 | 2 | 0 | — | | — | | — | | 30 | 2 |
| Universitatea Cluj | 2011–12 | Liga I | 29 | 0 | 0 | 0 | — | | — | | — | | 29 | 0 |
| Petrolul Ploiești | 2012–13 | Liga I | 2 | 1 | — | | — | | — | | — | | 2 | 1 |
| Steaua București | 2012–13 | Liga I | 20 | 4 | 1 | 0 | — | | 6 (Note: Appearances in UEFA Europa League) | 0 | — | | 27 | 4 |
| Steaua București | 2013–14 | Liga I | 29 | 4 | 4 | 0 | — | | 12 (Note: Appearances in UEFA Champions League) | 0 | 1 (Note: Appearance in Supercupa României) | 1 | 46 | 5 |
| Steaua București | 2014–15 | Liga I | 16 | 4 | 0 | 0 | 0 | 0 | 11 (Note: Six appearances in UEFA Champions League, five appearances in UEFA Europa League) | 0 | 1 | 0 | 28 | 4 |
| Steaua București | Total | | 65 | 12 | 5 | 0 | 0 | 0 | 29 | 0 | 2 | 1 | 101 | 13 |
| Al-Ittihad | 2014–15 | Saudi Professional League | 12 | 3 | 3 | 0 | — | | — | | — | | 15 | 3 |
| Osmanlıspor | 2015–16 | Süper Lig | 10 | 0 | 0 | 0 | — | | — | | — | | 10 | 0 |
| Osmanlıspor | 2016–17 | Süper Lig | 2 | 0 | 3 | 0 | — | | 0 | 0 | — | | 5 | 0 |
| Osmanlıspor | 2017–18 | Süper Lig | 0 | 0 | — | | — | | — | | — | | 0 | 0 |
| Osmanlıspor | Total | | 12 | 0 | 3 | 0 | — | | 0 | 0 | — | | 15 | 0 |
| Ankaragücü | 2017–18 | TFF 1. Lig | 5 | 0 | 1 | 0 | — | | — | | — | | 5 | 0 |
| Ankaragücü | 2018–19 | Süper Lig | 1 | 0 | 0 | 0 | — | | — | | — | | 1 | 0 |
| Ankaragücü | Total | | 6 | 0 | 1 | 0 | — | | — | | — | | 6 | 0 |
| Career total | | | 285 | 24 | 18 | 1 | 0 | 0 | 29 | 0 | 2 | 1 | 334 | 26 |

=== International ===
Appearances and goals by national team and year
| National team | Year | Apps | Goals |
|---|---|---|---|
Poland
| Poland | 2013 | 4 | 0 |
| Poland | 2014 | 6 | 1 |
| Poland | 2015 | 7 | 0 |
| Total | | 17 | 1 |

Scores and results list Poland's goal tally first, score column indicates score after each Szukała goal.

List of international goals scored by Łukasz Szukała
| No. | Date | Venue | Cap | Opponent | Score | Result | Competition |
|---|---|---|---|---|---|---|---|
| 1 | 7 September 2014 | Estádio Algarve, Faro, Portugal | 7 | Gibraltar | 5–0 | 7–0 | UEFA Euro 2016 qualifying |

== Honours ==
Steaua București

- Liga I: 2012–13, 2013–14
- Cupa României: 2014–15
- Supercupa României: 2013

Individual

- Gazeta Sporturilor Foreign Player of the Year in Romania: 2014
