= Lucian Filip =

Romanian footballer

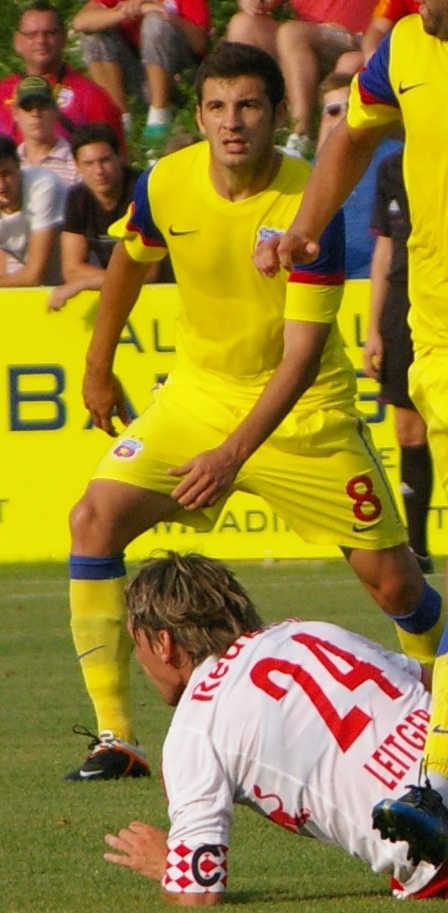

Personal information
- Full name: Lucian Ionuț Filip
- Date of birth: 25 September 1990 (age 36)
- Place of birth: Craiova, Romania
- Height: 1.84 m (6 ft 0 in)
- Positions: Defensive midfielder; defender

Team information
- Current team: FCSB II (head coach)

Youth career
- 1998–2004: CSȘ Craiova
- 2004–2007: Școala de Fotbal Gheorghe Popescu

Senior career*
Years	Team	Apps	(Gls)
2007–2011	Steaua II București	39	(2)
2009–2021	FCSB	127	(6)
2010	→ Unirea Urziceni (loan)	4	(0)
2011	→ Snagov (loan)	12	(0)
2012	→ Concordia Chiajna (loan)	16	(3)
2021–2022	Academica Clinceni	6	(0)
Total		204	(11)

International career
2007–2008	Romania U17	3	(2)
2009–2010	Romania U19	4	(0)
2012	Romania U21	4	(1)

Managerial career
- 2022–2026: FCSB (fitness coach)
- 2023: FCSB (caretaker)
- 2026: FCSB (scout)
- 2026: FCSB (fitness coach)
- 2026: FCSB (caretaker)
- 2026–: FCSB (assistant)
- 2026–: FCSB II
- * Club domestic league appearances and goals

Lucian Ionuț Filip (born 25 September 1990) is a former Romanian professional footballer who played as a defensive midfielder and as defender, currently in charge at Liga III club FCSB II.

== Club career ==
=== Steaua II București ===
Filip played for FCSB's youth team until the autumn of 2008 when he was selected for the senior team. On this occasion he earned his first appearance at senior level for Steaua in Cupa României's Round of 32 where his team lost the game to Sportul Studențesc failing to advance in the next competition's round.

=== Steaua București ===
After his first match at FCSB in the Cup he returned playing for the team's second squad only to return in the winter break after impressing coach Marius Lăcătuș. He is now waiting his first appearance for Steaua in the national league.

In July 2009, he was sent to the second team.

On 18 October 2009 he made his debut for FCSB in Liga I in the victory against Politehnica Iaşi.

In May 2012, after a series of good performances, he was included by Sport.ro in a Top 10 list of Romanian youths to watch.

== Career statistics ==
=== Club ===
Appearances and goals by club, season and competition
Club	Season	League			Cupa României		Cupa Ligii		Europe		Other		Total	
Club	Season	Division	Apps	Goals	Apps	Goals	Apps	Goals	Apps	Goals	Apps	Goals	Apps	Goals
Steaua II București (loan)	2007–08	Liga III	?	?	–		–		–		–		?	?
Steaua II București (loan)	2008–09	Liga III	?	?	–		–		–		–		?	?
Steaua II București (loan)	2009–10	Liga II	25	2	–		–		–		–		25	2
Steaua II București (loan)	2010–11	Liga II	14	0	–		–		–		–		14	0
Steaua II București (loan)	Total		39	2	–		–		–		–		182	7
FCSB	2008–09	Liga I	0	0	1	0	–		0	0	–		1	0
FCSB	2009–10	Liga I	2	0	0	0	–		0	0	–		2	0
FCSB	2010–11	Liga I	0	0	0	0	–		–		–		0	0
FCSB	2012–13	Liga I	17	0	2	0	–		5 (Note: Appearances in UEFA Europa League)	0	–		24	0
FCSB	2013–14	Liga I	12	2	2	0	–		4 (Note: Appearances in UEFA Champions League)	0	0	0	18	2
FCSB	2014–15	Liga I	16	0	3	0	2	0	10 (Note: Six appearances in UEFA Champions League, four appearances and one goal in UEFA Europa League)	1	1 (Note: Appearance in Supercupa României)	0	32	1
FCSB	2015–16	Liga I	22	1	4	0	2	0	2	0	0	0	30	1
FCSB	2016–17	Liga I	0	0	0	0	0	0	0	0	–		0	0
FCSB	2017–18	Liga I	14	0	1	0	–		5 (Note: One appearance in UEFA Champions League, four appearances in UEFA Europa League)	0	–		20	0
FCSB	2018–19	Liga I	31	3	2	0	–		4	0	–		37	3
FCSB	2019–20	Liga I	11	0	1	0	–		4	0	–		16	0
FCSB	2020–21	Liga I	2	0	0	0	–		0	0	0	0	2	0
FCSB	Total		127	6	16	0	4	0	34	1	1	0	182	7
Unirea Urziceni (loan)	2010–11	Liga I	4	0	1	0	–		0	0	–		5	0
Snagov (loan)	2011–12	Liga II	12	0	0	0	–		–		–		12	0
Concordia Chiajna (loan)	2011–12	Liga I	16	3	–		–		–		–		16	3
Academica Clinceni	2021–22	Liga I	6	0	0	0	–		–		–		6	0
Career total			204	11	17	0	4	0	34	1	1	0	260	12

=== Managerial ===
As of match played 18 May 2026

Managerial record by team and tenure
Team	From	To	Record							
Team	From	To	P	W	D	L	GF	GA	GD	Win %
(Romania) FCSB (caretaker)	3 March 2023	30 March 2023	3	1	1	1	3	4	−1	33.33
(Romania) FCSB (caretaker)	22 April 2026	18 May 2026	4	1	1	2	3	6	−3	25.00
(Romania) FCSB II	7 November 2026	present	1	1	0	0	3	2	+1	100.00
Total			8	3	2	3	9	12	−3	37.50

== Honours ==
=== Player ===
Steaua II București

- Liga III: 2008–09

FCSB

- Liga I: 2012–13, 2013–14, 2014–15
- Cupa României: 2014–15, 2019–20
- Cupa Ligii: 2014–15, 2015–16
- Supercupa României: 2013

== Notes ==
^1 The 2007–08 and 2008–09 Liga III appearances and goals made for Steaua II București are unavailable.
