= Cristian Pușcaș =

Romanian footballer

Personal information
- Full name: Cristian Nicușor Pușcaș
- Date of birth: 20 January 1994 (age 32)
- Place of birth: Reghin, Romania
- Height: 1.88 m (6 ft 2 in)
- Position: Midfielder

Team information
- Current team: Politehnica Iași
- Number: 29

Youth career
- –2008: ACS Kinder Târgu Mureș
- 2008–2010: Steaua București

Senior career*
Years	Team	Apps	(Gls)
2010–2011	Steaua II București	9	(0)
2011–2015	Steaua București	0	(0)
2012	→ Gloria Buzău (loan)	6	(0)
2013–2015	→ Academica Clinceni (loan)	48	(6)
2015	Sportul Snagov	9	(2)
2016	Fjarðabyggðar	5	(1)
2017–2018	Dunărea Călărași	53	(8)
2019	Petrolul Ploiești	15	(4)
2019–2020	UTA Arad	5	(0)
2020	Turris Turnu Măgurele	6	(1)
2021	Dunărea Călărași	16	(2)
2021–2022	Politehnica Iași	12	(1)

International career
2012	Romania U-19	2	(0)
- * Club domestic league appearances and goals as of 11:43, 22 June 2022 (UTC)

Cristian Nicușor Pușcaș (born 20 January 1994) is a Romanian professional footballer who plays as a midfielder for Politehnica Iași. In his career Pușcaș also played for teams such as: Steaua II București, FC Gloria Buzău, Metalul Reșița and Dunărea Călărași, among others.

== Honours ==
Steaua București

- Liga I: 2012–13

Dunărea Călărași

- Liga II: 2017–18

UTA Arad

- Liga II: 2019–20
