= Alexandru Tudor =

Romanian football referee

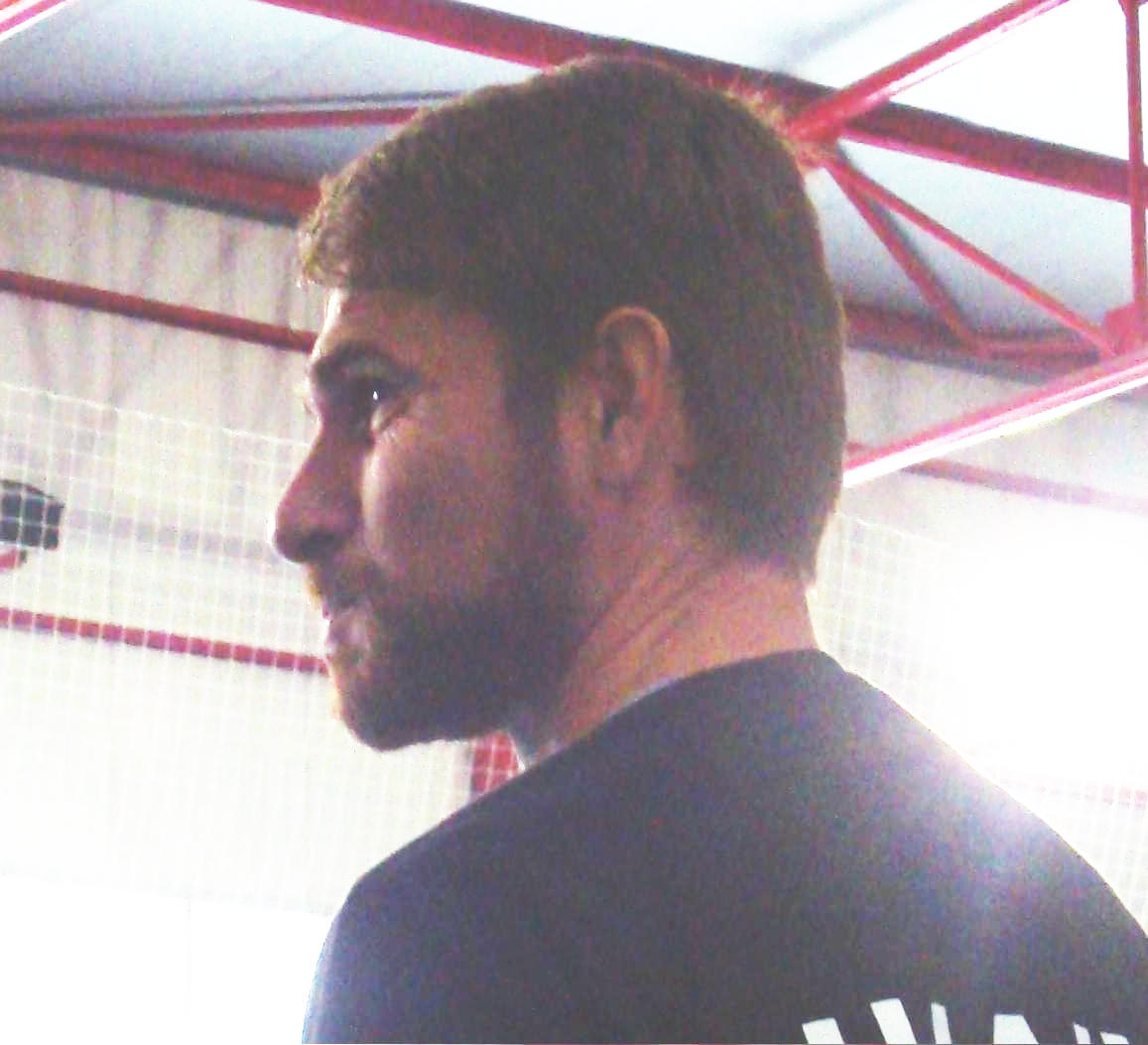
- Full name: Alexandru Dan Tudor
- Born: 13 September 1971 (age 55); Bucharest, Romania

Domestic
Years	League	Role
1990–2018	Romania	Referee
1999–2018	Liga I	Referee

International
Years	League	Role
2001–2016	FIFA listed	Referee

Alexandru Dan Tudor (born 13 September 1971) is a retired Romanian football referee. He refereed his first match in the Romanian First Division on 15 May 1999, when he officiated a match between Universitatea Craiova and Universitatea Cluj. He was a FIFA-listed referee from 2001 to 2016, and refereed his first UEFA Champions League qualifying match on 31 July 2002. He took charge of a UEFA Cup first round match between Celta de Vigo and Odense Boldklub two months later, but it was not until 4 November 2008 that he refereed his first Champions League group stage match, when he officiated a match between Barcelona and Basel. He refereed his last official match in the Romanian First Division on 14 December 2018, when he officiated a thrilling game between Concordia Chiajna and FC Politehnica Iași, 3-6. Nicknamed Brad Pitt thanks to his looks, Tudor holds the record for the most games officiated in Liga 1, with over 380 matches under his badge.

At international level, Tudor has officiated at the 2001 FIFA U-17 World Championship, qualifying matches for Euro 2004, Euro 2008, and Euro 2012, and the 2006, 2010, and 2014 World Cup qualifiers.
