= Alexandru Aldea (footballer) =

Romanian footballer

Personal information
- Full name: Alexandru Cătălin Aldea
- Date of birth: 5 March 1995 (age 31)
- Place of birth: Bucharest, Romania
- Height: 1.80 m (5 ft 11 in)
- Positions: Centre midfielder; defensive midfielder

Youth career
- –2013: Steaua București

Senior career*
Years	Team	Apps	(Gls)
2013–2018	Steaua București	0	(0)
2014–2015	→ Fortuna Poiana Câmpina (loan)	5	(0)
2015	→ Ceahlăul Piatra Neamț (loan)	5	(0)
2016	→ Sporting Turnu Măgurele (loan)	8	(2)
2016–2017	→ Steaua II București		
2017	→ Oltenița (loan)	11	(0)
2018–2019	Steaua București		
2019–2020	Bucharest United		
2020–2021	Balotești	2	(0)
- * Club domestic league appearances and goals as of 30 April 2021

Alexandru Cătălin Aldea (born 5 March 1995) is a Romanian professional footballer who plays as a centre midfielder or defensive midfielder.

== Career statistics ==
=== Club ===
As of 21 May 2016

Club	Season	League		Domestic Cup		League Cup		Continental		Other		Total	
Club	Season	Apps	Goals	Apps	Goals	Apps	Goals	Apps	Goals	Apps	Goals	Apps	Goals
Steaua Bucuresti	2013–14	0	0	0	0	–		0	0	0	0	0	0
Steaua Bucuresti	2014–15	0	0	0	0	1	0	0	0	0	0	1	0
Steaua Bucuresti	2015–16	0	0	0	0	0	0	0	0	0	0	0	0
Steaua Bucuresti	Total	0	0	0	0	1	0	0	0	0	0	1	0
Fortuna Poiana Câmpina	2014–15	5	0	1	0	-		–		–		6	0
Ceahlăul Piatra Neamț	2014–15	5	0	–		–		–		–		5	0
Sporting Turnu Măgurele	2015–16	8	2	–		–		–		–		0	0
CSM Oltenița	2016–17	10	4	–		–		–		–		0	0
Career total		28	6	1	0	1	0	0	0	0	0	12	0

== Honours ==
FCSB

- Romanian Liga I: 2013–14
