= 2018–19 CS Concordia Chiajna season =

Concordia Chiajna
2018–19 season
- Chairman: Cristian Tănase
- Manager: Ionuț Badea
- Stadium: Concordia
- Cupa României: Round of 32

During the 2018–19 season, Concordia Chiajna competed in Liga I and in Cupa României.

== Previous season positions ==
	Competition	Position
(Romania)	Liga I	11th
(Romania)	Cupa României	Round of 32

== Competitions ==
Win Draw Loss

=== Liga I ===
The Liga I fixture list was announced on 5 July 2018.

==== Regular season ====
===== Table =====
Pos	Team	Pld	W	D	L	GF	GA	GD	Pts	Qualification
10	Hermannstadt	26	9	5	12	25	28	−3	32	Qualification for the Relegation round
11	Gaz Metan Mediaș	26	7	10	9	25	32	−7	31	Qualification for the Relegation round
12	Dunărea Călărași	26	4	12	10	16	25	−9	24	Qualification for the Relegation round
13	Voluntari	26	4	9	13	30	46	−16	21	Qualification for the Relegation round
14	Concordia Chiajna	26	4	6	16	19	45	−26	18	Qualification for the Relegation round

Source: LPF (in Romanian), Soccerway
Rules for classification: 1) Points; 2) Head-to-head points; 3) Head-to-head goal difference; 4) Head-to-head goals scored; 5) Goal difference; 6) Goals scored; 7) Play-off.

===== Results summary =====
Overall								Home						Away					
Pld	W	D	L	GF	GA	GD	Pts	W	D	L	GF	GA	GD	W	D	L	GF	GA	GD
26	4	6	16	19	45	−26	18	1	5	7	9	22	−13	3	1	9	10	23	−13

Last updated: 1 March 2019.
Source: Liga I

===== Results by round =====
Round	1	2	3	4	5	6	7	8	9	10	11	12	13	14	15	16	17	18	19	20	21	22	23	24	25	26
Ground	A	H	A	H	A	H	A	H	A	H	A	A	H	H	A	H	A	H	A	H	A	H	A	H	H	A
Result	L	D	L	W	W	L	L	L	W	D	W	L	D	D	D	L	L	L	L	L	L	L	L	D	L	L

Updated to match(es) played on 1 March 2019. Source: Liga I
A = Away; H = Home; W = Win; D = Draw; L = Loss

===== Matches =====
Win Draw Loss

23 July 2018 1	Gaz Metan Mediaș	2–1	Concordia Chiajna	Mediaș
18:00 EEST (UTC+3)	Nasser Chamed 27'; Fofana (yellow card) 36'; V.Crețu (yellow card) 80'; Fortes 90+3'	Report	Guessan 39' (yellow card) 60'; G.Matei (yellow card) 45'	Stadium: Gaz Metan; Attendance: 700; Referee: George Cătălin Găman

30 July 2018 2	Concordia Chiajna	1–1	Viitorul Constanța	Chiajna
21:00 EEST (UTC+3)	A.Marc 32'	Report	Luchin (yellow card) 66'; P.Iacob (yellow card) 87'; Voduț (yellow card) 88'; L.Houri 89'	Stadium: Concordia; Attendance: 500; Referee: George Rădulescu

4 August 2018 3	CFR Cluj	2–1	Concordia Chiajna	Cluj-Napoca
21:00 EEST (UTC+3)	Țucudean 54'; M.Bordeianu (yellow card) 70'; Culio 74' (pen.); Camora (yellow card) 90+2'	Report	Batin 84'	Stadium: Dr. Constantin Rădulescu; Attendance: 4,570; Referee: Sorin Andrei Antonie

11 August 2018 4	Concordia Chiajna	2–0	Hermannstadt	Chiajna
18:00 EEST (UTC+3)	Batin 38' (pen.); Nivaldo (yellow card) 55'; Caparco (yellow card) 87'; D.Panait 88'	Report	I.Antonov (yellow card) 27'; Chalkiadakis (yellow card) 56'	Stadium: Concordia; Attendance: 200; Referee: Marian Alexandru Barbu

20 August 2018 5	Universitatea Craiova	0–1	Concordia Chiajna	Craiova
21:00 EEST (UTC+3)	Donkor (red card) 19'; A.Mitriță (yellow card) 23'; Mateiu (yellow card) 53'; Bancu (yellow card) 59'	Report	Guessan (yellow card) 21'; Grădinaru (yellow card) 33'; Batin (yellow card) 36'; G.Matei (yellow card) 67'; Gorobsov 81' (yellow card) 82'	Stadium: Ion Oblemenco; Attendance: 12,000; Referee: Ionuţ Coza

24 August 2018 6	Concordia Chiajna	0–3	Astra Giurgiu	Chiajna
21:00 EEST (UTC+3)	Caparco (yellow card) 78'; Gorobsov (yellow card) 90+3'	Report	Llullaku (yellow card) 17'; Balaure 56'; Biceanu (yellow card) 75'; N.Roșu 80' (pen.), 78'; Bègue 82'	Stadium: Concordia; Attendance: 1,200; Referee: Marcel Bîrsan (Bucharest)

3 September 2018 7	Politehnica Iași	3–0	Concordia Chiajna	Iași
21:00 EEST (UTC+3)	C.Albu 14' (o.g.); D.Flores 35'; A.Cristea (yellow card) 42'; Qaka (yellow card) 80'; Bekui 88'	Report	Bărboianu (yellow card) 57'; Grădinaru (yellow card) 64'; A.Marc (yellow card) 90+3'	Stadium: Emil Alexandrescu; Attendance: 1,500; Referee: George Rădulescu

14 September 2018 8	Concordia Chiajna	0–3	Sepsi Sfântu Gheorghe	Chiajna
18:00 EEST (UTC+3)	Leca (yellow card) 42'; Gorobsov (yellow card) 60'; A.Marc (yellow card) 64'	Report	D.Sato (yellow card) 30'; O.Viera (yellow card) 52'; Tandia 76', 90+1'; Nouvier 82'; I.Jovanović (yellow card) 87'	Stadium: Concordia; Attendance: 200; Referee: Sebastian Colțescu

22 September 2018 9	FC Botoșani	0–2	Concordia Chiajna	Botoșani
18:00 EEST (UTC+3)	E.Papa (yellow card) 1'; J.Rodríguez (yellow card) 44'; Fabbrini (yellow card) 86'; Golofca (yellow card) 90+2'	Report	A.Marc 32'; G.Matei (yellow card) 43'; Guessan 45'; Gorobsov (yellow card) 57'; Leca (yellow card) 67'; Prepeliță (yellow card) 86'; Greab (yellow card) 90'	Stadium: Municipal; Attendance: 2,000; Referee: Lucian Ruşandu

1 October 2018 10	Concordia Chiajna	1–1	Dunărea Călărași	Chiajna
18:00 EEST (UTC+3)	Prepeliță 60'	Report	C.N.Pușcaș (yellow card) 41'; Keyta 44' (pen.); B.Șandru (yellow card) 90+3'; S.Cucu (yellow card) 90'	Stadium: Concordia; Attendance: 150; Referee: Horia Gabriel Mladinovici

7 October 2018 11	FCSB	0–1	Concordia Chiajna	Voluntari
21:00 EEST (UTC+3)	F.Teixeira (yellow card) 87'	Report	Grădinaru (yellow card) 52'; Batin 60'; Gorobsov (yellow card) 67'; R.Deaconu (yellow card) 73'; P.Ivanovici (yellow card) 77'; Greab (yellow card) 90+4'	Stadium: Anghel Iordănescu; Attendance: 800; Referee: Alexandru Tudor (Bucharest)

19 October 2018 12	FC Voluntari	4–0	Concordia Chiajna	Voluntari
18:00 EEST (UTC+3)	I.Armaș 22'; Gadze 33'; Căpățînă 46' (yellow card) 55'; Bucurică (yellow card) 55'; Malfleury (yellow card) 59'; Belahmeur (yellow card) 62'; Kabasele 89'	Report	Batin (yellow card) 43'; A.Marc (yellow card) 55'; Bawab (yellow card) 55'; Bărboianu (yellow card) 76' (yellow-red card) 81'	Stadium: Anghel Iordănescu; Attendance: 800; Referee: Horațiu Feșnic (Cluj)

29 October 2018 13	Concordia Chiajna	0–0	Dinamo București	Chiajna
21:00 EET (UTC+2)	Fota (yellow card) 38'; Leca (yellow card) 63'	Report	Cooper (yellow card) 84'	Stadium: Concordia; Attendance: 3,500; Referee: Radu Petrescu

5 November 2018 14	Concordia Chiajna	0–0	Gaz Metan Mediaș	Chiajna
18:00 EET (UTC+2)	A.Marc (yellow card) 59'; Grădinaru (yellow card) 74'	Report		Stadium: Concordia; Attendance: 200; Referee: George Rădulescu

10 November 2018 15	Viitorul Constanța	0–0	Concordia Chiajna	Ovidiu
18:00 EET (UTC+2)		Report	Prepeliță (yellow card) 7'; Fota (yellow card) 40'; Măzărache (yellow card) 45'; Leca (yellow card) 58'	Stadium: Viitorul; Attendance: 2,000; Referee: Ionuţ Coza

24 November 2018 16	Concordia Chiajna	0–1	CFR Cluj	Chiajna
18:30 EET (UTC+2)	M.Cristescu (yellow card) 39'	Report	Culio (yellow card) 7' (yellow-red card) 90+3'; D.Djoković 23'	Stadium: Concordia; Attendance: 500; Referee: Sebastian Colțescu

1 December 2018 17	Hermannstadt	2–1	Concordia Chiajna	Târgu Mureș
14:00 EET (UTC+2)	P.Petrescu 4'; Dandea 28'	Report	Batin 45' (pen.); Ropotan (yellow card) 51'; A.Marc (yellow card) 79'	Stadium: Trans-Sil; Attendance: 100; Referee: Lucian Ruşandu

6 December 2018 18	Concordia Chiajna	1–3	Universitatea Craiova	Chiajna
20:00 EET (UTC+2)	Ropotan 27' (yellow card) 84'; Gorobsov (yellow card) 63'	Report	Koljić 24' (pen.) (yellow card) 67'; C.Bărbuț 32'; Cicâldău 39'; T.Ferreira (yellow card) 58'	Stadium: Concordia; Attendance: 800; Referee: Marcel Bîrsan (Bucharest)

9 December 2018 19	Astra Giurgiu	3–1	Concordia Chiajna	Giurgiu
17:00 EET (UTC+2)	Bègue 49'; Alibec 76' (pen.) (yellow card) 90+2'; Llullaku 88'; Radunović (yellow card) 90+1'	Report	Leca (yellow card) 37' (goal) 73'; P.Ivanovici (yellow card) 56'	Stadium: Marin Anastasovici; Attendance: 200; Referee: Iulian Dima

14 December 2018 20	Concordia Chiajna	3–6	Politehnica Iași	Chiajna
20:00 EET (UTC+2)	A.Marc 21', 64'; Gorobsov (yellow card) 62'; C.Albu 67'	Report	A.Cristea 4', 57'; M.Sanoh 8', 55'; D.Flores 48' (yellow card) 73'; Frăsinescu (yellow card) 90'; Platini 90+1'	Stadium: Concordia; Attendance: 50; Referee: Alexandru Tudor (Bucharest)

21 December 2018 21	Sepsi Sfântu Gheorghe	3–0	Concordia Chiajna	Sfântu Gheorghe
20:00 EET (UTC+2)	G.de Moura (yellow card) 7'; Simonovski 35'; F.Ștefan 45+2'; Nouvier 59' (pen.); O.Viera (yellow card) 79'	Report	P.Ivanovici (yellow card) 7'; Batin (yellow card) 43'; G.Matei (yellow card) 57'; Bărboianu (yellow card) 77'	Stadium: Municipal; Attendance: 2,500; Referee: Sorin Andrei Antonie

1 February 2019 22	Concordia Chiajna	0–1	Botoșani	Chiajna
17:00 EET (UTC+2)	Măzărache (yellow card) 29'; Bărboianu (yellow card) 33'; Tha'er Bawab (yellow card) 36'; Ropotan (yellow card) 63'; Radu (yellow card) 76'; Guessan (yellow card) 78'	Summary	Rodríguez (yellow card) 52'; Fabbrini 72'; Târșă (yellow card) 73'; Miron (yellow card) 77'	Stadium: Concordia; Attendance: 300; Referee: George Cătălin Găman

10 February 2019 23	Dunărea Călărași	2–1	Concordia Chiajna	Călărași
12:00 EET (UTC+2)	Bourceanu (yellow card) 25'; Honciu 36'; Luchin (yellow card) 66'; Ammari 90+4' (yellow card) 90+4'	Summary	Guessan 26' (pen.); João Meira (yellow card) 43'; Fota (yellow card) 70'; Greab (yellow card) 88'	Stadium: Ion Comșa; Attendance: 3,500; Referee: Horia Gabriel Mladinovici

18 February 2019 24	Concordia Chiajna	0–0	FCSB	Chiajna
20:00 EET (UTC+2)	João Meira (yellow card) 15'; Radu (yellow card) 35'; Ropotan (yellow card) 38'; Marc (yellow card) 64'; Caparco (yellow card) 75'; Cadamuro (yellow card) 90+1'	Summary		Stadium: Concordia; Attendance: 3,000; Referee: Adrian Viorel Cojocaru

25 February 2019 25	Concordia Chiajna	1–3	Voluntari	Chiajna
20:00 EET (UTC+2)	Grădinaru (yellow card) 21'; Ropotan (yellow card) 31'; Moussa 69'	Summary	Krasniqi (yellow card) 31'; Tudorie 71'; Balaur 76'; Gadze 88'	Stadium: Concordia; Attendance: 150; Referee: Marian Alexandru Barbu

1 March 2019 26	Dinamo București	2–1	Concordia Chiajna	Bucharest
20:00 EET (UTC+2)	Aït-Atmane (yellow card) 36'; Papazoglou 39' (yellow card) 78'; Sorescu 66'	Summary	Ropotan (yellow card) 10' (goal) 69'; Gorobsov (yellow card) 73'; Moussa (yellow card) 81'; Grădinaru (yellow card) 82'	Stadium: Dinamo; Attendance: 955; Referee: Andrei Florin Chivulete

==== Relegation round ====
===== Table =====
Pos	Team	Pld	W	D	L	GF	GA	GD	Pts	Qualification or relegation
7	Gaz Metan Mediaș	14	10	2	2	25	9	+16	48	
8	Botoșani	14	8	2	4	18	9	+9	44	
9	Dinamo București	14	8	3	3	16	7	+9	43	
10	Politehnica Iași	14	3	5	6	12	18	−6	31	
11	Voluntari	14	5	5	4	14	16	−2	31	
12	Hermannstadt (O)	14	2	5	7	9	19	−10	27	Qualification for the relegation play-offs
13	Dunărea Călărași (R)	14	3	4	7	8	18	−10	25	Relegation to Liga II
14	Concordia Chiajna (R)	14	2	4	8	17	23	−6	19	Relegation to Liga II

Source: Soccerway
Rules for classification: 1) Points; 2) Points without rounding; 3) Head-to-head points; 4) Head-to-head goal difference; 5) Head-to-head goals scored; 6) Goal difference; 7) Goals scored; 8) Play-off (only if needed to decide teams for relegation). (Note: only criteria 6 and 7 are applied to establish the classification during the competition.)
(O) Play-off winners; (R) Relegated

===== Results summary =====
Overall								Home						Away					
Pld	W	D	L	GF	GA	GD	Pts	W	D	L	GF	GA	GD	W	D	L	GF	GA	GD
14	2	4	8	17	23	−6	10	2	2	3	12	11	+1	0	2	5	5	12	−7

Last updated: 2 June 2019.
Source: Liga I

===== Position by round =====
Round	1	2	3	4	5	6	7	8	9	10	11	12	13	14
Ground	A	H	H	A	H	A	H	H	A	A	H	A	H	A
Result	D	D	L	L	W	D	L	D	L	L	L	L	W	L
Position	14	14	14	14	14	14	14	14	14	14	14	14	14	14

Updated to match(es) played on 2 June 2019. Source: Liga I
A = Away; H = Home; W = Win; D = Draw; L = Loss

===== Matches =====
Win Draw Loss

11 March 2019 1	Botoșani	0–0	Concordia Chiajna	Botoșani
17:30 EEST	Fabbrini (yellow card) 39'; Golofca (yellow card) 84'; Dumitraș (yellow card) 88'	Summary	Gorobsov (yellow card) 33'; Grădinaru (yellow card) 39'; Fota (yellow card) 52'; Albu (yellow card) 67'; Marc (yellow card) 75'; Rîmniceanu (yellow card) 79'; Cadamuro (yellow card) 90+1'	Stadium: Municipal; Attendance: 1,200; Referee: Sorin Andrei Antonie

18 March 2019 2	Concordia Chiajna	2–2	Hermannstadt	Chiajna
	Gorobsov 16'; Tha'er Bawab 18'; Cadamuro (yellow card) 24'; Alexe (yellow card) 51'; Ropotan (yellow card) 54'	Report	Tsoumou 4'; Jazvić 12'; Pârvulescu (yellow card) 30'; Offenbacher (yellow card) 50'; Stoica (yellow card) 57'	Stadium: Concordia; Attendance: 400; Referee: Robert Dumitru

31 March 2019 3	Concordia Chiajna	1–2	Voluntari	Chiajna
	Bărboianu (yellow card) 3'; Ivanovici (yellow card) 12'; Gorobsov (yellow card) 31'; Marc (yellow card) 55'; Ropotan (yellow card) 59'; Guessan (yellow card) 72'; Moussa 77' (yellow card) 90+3'	Report	Ricardinho 29'; Balaur (yellow card) 57'; Răuță (yellow card) 70'; Deac 75'	Stadium: Concordia; Attendance: 700; Referee: George Rădulescu

5 April 2019 4	Dinamo București	3–2	Concordia Chiajna	Bucharest
	Zenke (yellow card) 18' (goal) 56'; Papazoglou 28' 48'; Dussaut (yellow card) 39'; Jaadi (yellow card) 75'	Report	Gorobsov (yellow card) 22'; Ivanovici 68'; Albu (yellow card) 74'; Nivaldo (yellow card) 90+2'; Tha'er Bawab 90+3'	Stadium: Dinamo; Attendance: 1,146; Referee: Adrian Comănescu

12 April 2019 5	Concordia Chiajna	3–0	Dunărea Călărași	Chiajna
	Marc (yellow card) 21' (goal) 45+1'; Dobrosavlevici 27' (o.g.); Nivaldo 69'; Koutroumpis (yellow card) 86'	Report		Stadium: Concordia; Attendance: 485; Referee: Horaiu Fesnic

22 April 2019 6	Politehnica Iași	1–1	Concordia Chiajna	Iași
	Qaka (yellow card) 42'; Enoh 46'; Filipe Nascimento (yellow card) 71'	Report	João Meira (yellow card) 27'; Cristescu (yellow card) 38' (goal) 43'; Koutroumpis (yellow card) 63'	Stadium: Emil Alexandrescu; Attendance: 1,500; Referee: Iulian Călin

26 April 2019 7	Concordia Chiajna	0–2	Gaz Metan Mediaș	Chiajna
	Koutroumpis (yellow card) 28'; Cristescu (yellow card) 54'; Ivanovici (yellow card) 70'; Marc (yellow card) 89'	Report	Crețu (yellow card) 17'; Olaru (yellow card) 59' (goal) 72'; Yazalde 67'; Constantin (yellow card) 90+2'	Stadium: Concordia; Attendance: 500; Referee: Adrian Cojocaru

3 May 2019 8	Concordia Chiajna	2–2	Botoșani	Chiajna
	Moussa 9'; João Meira (yellow card) 23'; Ropotan (yellow card) 27'; Cadamuro 69'	Report	Pițian (yellow card) 61'; João Meira 64' (o.g.); Roman 71'	Stadium: Concordia; Attendance: 150; Referee: Ovidiu Hațegan

11 May 2019 9	Hermannstadt	1–0	Concordia Chiajna	Sibiu
	Blănaru 33'; Serediuc (yellow card) 65'; Jazvić (yellow card) 67'; Tătar (yellow card) 80'; Acsinte (yellow card) 90+1' (yellow-red card) 90+1'	Report	Ropotan (yellow card) 19'; Marc (yellow card) 60'; Radu (yellow card) 85'; Cristescu (yellow card) 90+4'	Stadium: Municipal; Attendance: 4,000; Referee: István Kovács (referee)

15 May 2019 10	Voluntari	2–1	Concordia Chiajna	Voluntari
	Balaur (yellow card) 45+1'; Răuță (yellow card) 82'; Tudorie 84' (pen.) 90+2' (yellow card) 90+3'	Report	Grădinaru 1'; Gorobsov (yellow card) 21'; Marc (yellow card) 66'; Koutroumpis (yellow card) 84'; Moussa (yellow card) 90+3'; Nivaldo (yellow card) 90+6'	Stadium: Anghel Iordănescu; Attendance: 150; Referee: Radu Petrescu

18 May 2019 11	Concordia Chiajna	0–2	Dinamo București	Chiajna
	Radu (yellow card) 64'	Report	Grigore (yellow card) 41'; Montini 59'; Jaadi 75'	Stadium: Concordia; Attendance: 1,000; Referee: Marian Barbu

22 May 2019 12	Dunărea Călărași	2–0	Concordia Chiajna	Călărași
	Mendy (yellow card) 52'; Luchin 76'; Bourceanu (yellow card) 80'; Ammari 90+4' (yellow card) 90+5'	Report	Moussa (yellow card) 45+1' (yellow-red card) 87'; Ropotan (yellow card) 52'; Cadamuro (yellow card) 73'; Gorobsov (yellow card) 90'	Stadium: Ion Comșa; Attendance: 1,500; Referee: Marcel Bîrsan

26 May 2019 13	Concordia Chiajna	4–1	Politehnica Iași	Chiajna
	Marc (yellow card) 6'; Tha'er Bawab 11' 71' (pen.); Nivaldo 29'; João Meira (yellow card) 56'; Ropotan (yellow card) 67'; Gorobsov 86'	Report	João Teixeira 57' (pen.)	Stadium: Concordia; Attendance: 50; Referee: Lucian Ruşandu

2 June 2019 14	Gaz Metan Mediaș	3–1	Concordia Chiajna	Mediaș
	Rondón 1' 6'; Yazalde 37'	Report	Fota (yellow card) 30'; Bărboianu (yellow card) 38'; Gorobsov 45' (yellow card) 67'; Ivanovici (yellow card) 80'	Stadium: Gaz Metan; Attendance: 1,000; Referee: Florin Mazilu

=== Cupa României ===
Concordia Chiajna entered the Cupa României at the Round of 32

26 September 2018 Round of 32	Concordia Chiajna	0–3	Viitorul Constanța	Chiajna
18:45	Bucșa (yellow card) 32'; Prepeliță (yellow card) 44' (yellow-red card) 45+2'; Leca (yellow card) 54'; Bărboianu (red card) 55'	Summary	Ghiță 14'; Houri (yellow card) 44'; Leca 65' (o.g.); Ciobanu (yellow card) 72' (goal) 90+3'	Stadium: Stadionul Concordia; Attendance: 500; Referee: George Găman

== See also ==
- 2018–19 Cupa României
- 2018–19 Liga I
