= 2018–19 FC Dinamo București season =

Dinamo București
2018–19 season
- Chairman: Alexandru David
- Manager: Florin Bratu, Claudiu Niculescu, Mircea Rednic
- Stadium: Dinamo
- Liga I: 9th
- Cupa României: Round of 16
- Top goalscorer: League: Mattia Montini (13); All: Mattia Montini (13)
- Highest home attendance: 21,763
- Lowest home attendance: 500
- Average home league attendance: 2,784
- Biggest win: 3-0 (vs. Poli Iași, U.Craiova)
- Biggest defeat: 1-4 (vs. Astra, Viitorul)
| Home colours | Away colours | Third colours |

The 2018–19 FC Dinamo București season is the 70th consecutive edition in Liga I, following Liga I 2018-19, of competitive football by Dinamo București. It competed in Cupa României 2018-2019.

== Previous season positions ==
| | Competition | Position |
|---|---|---|
| (Romania) | Liga I | 7th |
| (Romania) | Cupa României | Quarter-finals |

== Competitions ==
Win Draw Loss

=== Liga I ===
The Liga I fixture list was announced on 5 July 2018.

==== Regular season ====
===== Table =====
| Pos | Team | Pld | W | D | L | GF | GA | GD | Pts | Qualification |
|---|---|---|---|---|---|---|---|---|---|---|
| 7 | Botoșani | 26 | 9 | 9 | 8 | 31 | 33 | −2 | 36 | Qualification for the Relegation round |
| 8 | Politehnica Iași | 26 | 10 | 4 | 12 | 28 | 38 | −10 | 34 | Qualification for the Relegation round |
| 9 | Dinamo București | 26 | 8 | 8 | 10 | 29 | 37 | −8 | 32 | Qualification for the Relegation round |
| 10 | Hermannstadt | 26 | 9 | 5 | 12 | 25 | 28 | −3 | 32 | Qualification for the Relegation round |
| 11 | Gaz Metan Mediaș | 26 | 7 | 10 | 9 | 25 | 32 | −7 | 31 | Qualification for the Relegation round |

Source: LPF (in Romanian), Soccerway
Rules for classification: 1) Points; 2) Head-to-head points; 3) Head-to-head goal difference; 4) Head-to-head goals scored; 5) Goal difference; 6) Goals scored; 7) Play-off.

===== Results summary =====
| Overall | | | | | | | | Home | | | | | | Away | | | | | |
| Pld | W | D | L | GF | GA | GD | Pts | W | D | L | GF | GA | GD | W | D | L | GF | GA | GD |
|---|---|---|---|---|---|---|---|---|---|---|---|---|---|---|---|---|---|---|---|
| 21 | 5 | 7 | 9 | 22 | 34 | −12 | 22 | 4 | 4 | 2 | 12 | 10 | +2 | 1 | 3 | 7 | 10 | 24 | −14 |

Last updated: 8 January 2019.
Source: Liga I

===== Results by round =====
| Round | 1 | 2 | 3 | 4 | 5 | 6 | 7 | 8 | 9 | 10 | 11 | 12 | 13 | 14 | 15 | 16 | 17 | 18 | 19 | 20 | 21 | 22 | 23 | 24 | 25 | 26 |
|---|---|---|---|---|---|---|---|---|---|---|---|---|---|---|---|---|---|---|---|---|---|---|---|---|---|---|
| Ground | H | A | A | H | A | H | A | H | A | H | A | H | A | A | H | H | A | H | A | H | A | H | A | H | A | H |
| Result | W | D | L | W | L | W | L | L | L | D | L | D | D | W | D | D | L | L | D | W | L | W | W | L | D | W |
| Position | 1 | 2 | 8 | 4 | 8 | 4 | 8 | 10 | 10 | 10 | 12 | 12 | 12 | 9 | 9 | 10 | 10 | 11 | 11 | 11 | 11 | 11 | 11 | 11 | 11 | 9 |

Updated to match(es) played on 13 July 2018. Source: Liga I
A = Away; H = Home; W = Win; D = Draw; L = Loss

===== Matches =====
Win Draw Loss

| 22 July 2018 1 | Dinamo București | 2–1 | FC Voluntari | Bucharest |
| 21:00 EEST (UTC+3) | R.Moldoveanu (yellow card) 55'; Salomão 61'; D.Sorescu 75' | Report | Ciucur (yellow card) 49'; Ricardinho 57' | Stadium: Dinamo; Attendance: 2,689; Referee: Alexandru Tudor (Bucharest) |

| 29 July 2018 2 | FCSB | 3–3 | Dinamo București | Bucharest |
| 21:00 EEST (UTC+3) | Gnohéré 10' (yellow card) 13'; O.Popescu (yellow card) 16'; Man (yellow card) 20'; F.Coman 55', 68' | Report | Hanca (yellow card) 35'; M.Axente 45+2'; M.Popescu (yellow card) 45+4' (goal) 89'; Corbu (yellow card) 59'; Nistor 61' (yellow card) 77' | Stadium: Arena Națională; Attendance: 27,835; Referee: Ovidiu Hațegan |

| 6 August 2018 3 | Gaz Metan Mediaș | 3–2 | Dinamo București | Mediaș |
| 21:00 EEST (UTC+3) | D.Olaru 7'; Diallo (yellow card) 52'; M.Popescu 56' (o.g.); Fortes 58'; S.Bușu (yellow card) 78'; V.Crețu (yellow card) 89' | Report | Salomão 32'; R.Moldoveanu 47' | Stadium: Gaz Metan; Attendance: 6,500; Referee: Horațiu Feșnic (Cluj) |

| 13 August 2018 4 | Dinamo București | 1–0 | Viitorul Constanța | Bucharest |
| 21:00 EEST (UTC+3) | Mahlangu 34'; Ciobotariu (yellow card) 73'; R.Grigore (yellow card) 77' | Report | S.Mladen (yellow card) 24'; I.Hagi (yellow card) 74' | Stadium: Dinamo; Attendance: 3,140; Referee: István Kovács (Carei) |

| 19 August 2018 5 | CFR Cluj | 3–1 | Dinamo București | Cluj-Napoca |
| 21:00 EEST (UTC+3) | Țucudean (yellow card) 29' (goal) 66', 78'; Omrani 73' | Report | D.Sorescu (yellow card) 22'; M.Popescu 61' | Stadium: Dr. Constantin Rădulescu; Attendance: 7,700; Referee: Radu Petrescu |

| 25 August 2018 6 | Dinamo București | 2–1 | Hermannstadt | Bucharest |
| 21:00 EEST (UTC+3) | Salomão 4' (yellow card) 74'; M.Popescu (yellow card) 33'; Hanca (yellow card) 62'; Delorge (yellow card) 76'; Pešić 90+4' | Report | Nkololo 48'; A.Coman (yellow card) 49'; Tsoumou (yellow card) 55' (yellow-red card) 56'; Dandea (yellow card) 83'; Mijušković (yellow card) 84' | Stadium: Dinamo; Attendance: 1,887; Referee: Andrei Chivulete |

| 1 September 2018 7 | Universitatea Craiova | 3–0 | Dinamo București | Craiova |
| 21:30 EEST (UTC+3) | Fedele (yellow card) 32'; A.Mitriță (yellow card) 42' (goal) 70', 76'; Bancu (yellow card) 45'; Koljić 45+2'; Briceag (yellow card) 81' | Report | Cooper (yellow card) 38' | Stadium: Ion Oblemenco; Attendance: 25,000; Referee: Marcel Bîrsan (Bucharest) |

| 14 September 2018 8 | Dinamo București | 1–2 | Astra Giurgiu | Bucharest |
| 21:00 EEST (UTC+3) | Nistor (yellow card) 40'; V.Olteanu (yellow card) 58'; Hanca (yellow card) 69'; Corbu (yellow card) 85'; Subotić 89' | Report | Alibec 13'; Mrzljak (yellow card) 61'; R.Moise 66'; Llullaku (yellow card) 83'; Iliev (yellow card) 90+2' | Stadium: Dinamo; Attendance: 1,500; Referee: István Kovács (Carei) |

| 21 September 2018 9 | Politehnica Iași | 1–0 | Dinamo București | Iași |
| 21:00 EEST (UTC+3) | A.Cristea (yellow card) 25'; D.Flores 38'; A.Sin (yellow card) 41' | Report | Salomão (yellow card) 26'; Corbu (yellow card) 46' | Stadium: Emil Alexandrescu; Attendance: 6,800; Referee: Ovidiu Hațegan |

| 28 September 2018 10 | Dinamo București | 0–0 | Sepsi Sfântu Gheorghe | Bucharest |
| 21:00 EEST (UTC+3) | R.Grigore (yellow card) 51'; Nistor (yellow card) 90+1' | Report | S.Drăghici (yellow card) 20'; St.Velev (yellow card) 56'; Tandia (yellow card) 90' | Stadium: Dinamo; Attendance: 1,200; Referee: Marius Avram |

| 8 October 2018 11 | FC Botoșani | 2–0 | Dinamo București | Botoșani |
| 21:00 EEST (UTC+3) | R.Oaidă 3'; Chitoșcă (yellow card) 54'; E.Pap (yellow card) 80'; Fabbrini 90+1' | Report | Corbu (yellow card) 20'; Penedo (yellow card) 54'; Nistor (yellow card) 82' | Stadium: Municipal; Attendance: 5,000; Referee: Andrei Chivulete |

| 22 October 2018 12 | Dinamo București | 1–1 | Dunărea Călărași | Bucharest |
| 21:00 EEST (UTC+3) | D.Sorescu (yellow card) 46'; D.Popa 56'; Hanca (yellow card) 58' | Report | Pană (yellow card) 21'; Ndiaye 22'; Honciu (yellow card) 37'; D.Ispas (yellow card) 53'; Carnat (yellow card) 78'; A.Munteanu (yellow card) 90+2' (red card) 90+2' | Stadium: Dinamo; Attendance: 2,710; Referee: Alexandru Tudor (Bucharest) |

| 29 October 2018 13 | Concordia Chiajna | 0–0 | Dinamo București | Chiajna |
| 21:00 EET (UTC+2) | Fota (yellow card) 38'; Leca (yellow card) 63' | Report | Cooper (yellow card) 84' | Stadium: Concordia; Attendance: 3,500; Referee: Radu Petrescu |

| 5 November 2018 14 | FC Voluntari | 0–1 | Dinamo București | Voluntari |
| 21:00 EET (UTC+2) | Zgrablić (yellow card) 12' (yellow-red card) 90+3'; Hodorogea (yellow card) 61' | Report | Hanca (yellow card) 23'; Katsikas (yellow card) 26'; D.Sorescu (yellow card) 73'; Salomão 90+4' (pen.) | Stadium: Anghel Iordănescu; Attendance: 1,300; Referee: Cătălin Popa |

| 11 November 2018 15 | Dinamo București | 1–1 | FCSB | Bucharest |
| 21:00 EET (UTC+2) | Salomão 40' (pen.); Gomelt (yellow card) 71' | Report | Bălgrădean (yellow card) 39'; Gnohéré 48' (red card) 52'; F.Tănase 48'; R.Benzar (yellow card) 62'; D.Nedelcu (yellow card) 70'; Planić (yellow card) 87' | Stadium: Arena Națională; Attendance: 21,763; Referee: István Kovács (Carei) |

| 23 November 2018 16 | Dinamo București | 1–1 | Gaz Metan Mediaș | Bucharest |
| 20:30 EET (UTC+2) | Rachid (yellow card) 44'; M.Popescu (yellow card) 55' (yellow-red card) 87'; Salomão (yellow card) 84' (goal) 90+4' | Report | Trif 77'; Fofana (yellow card) 89'; Fortes (yellow card) 90+3' | Stadium: Dinamo; Attendance: 1,220; Referee: Iulian Călin |

| 1 December 2018 17 | Viitorul Constanța | 4–1 | Dinamo București | Ovidiu |
| 20:00 EET (UTC+2) | D.Drăguș 4'; I.Hagi 37', 90'; S.Mladen (yellow card) 57'; V.Achim 77' | Report | Montini 13'; V.Olteanu (yellow card) 15' (yellow-red card) 32'; Cooper (yellow card) 36'; Katsikas (yellow card) 86' | Stadium: Viitorul; Attendance: 1,500; Referee: Horațiu Feșnic (Cluj) |

| 4 December 2018 18 | Dinamo București | 0–3 | CFR Cluj | Bucharest |
| 20:00 EET (UTC+2) | D.Popa (yellow card) 22'; Zenke (yellow card) 27'; Nistor (yellow card) 40'; Gomelt (yellow card) 56' | Report | D.Djoković (yellow card) 31'; A.Păun 35'; Țucudean (yellow card) 38' (goal) 84'; M.Bordeianu (yellow card) 44'; Culio 51' (pen.) | Stadium: Dinamo; Attendance: 500; Referee: Marius Avram |

| 8 December 2018 19 | Hermannstadt | 1–1 | Dinamo București | Târgu Mureș |
| 17:00 EET (UTC+2) | P.Petrescu 32' | Report | Hanca 9'; Rachid (yellow card) 89' | Stadium: Trans-Sil; Attendance: 150; Referee: István Kovács (Carei) |

| 15 December 2018 20 | Dinamo București | 3–0 | Universitatea Craiova | Bucharest |
| 20:00 EET (UTC+2) | Montini 30', 48', 53'; Corbu (yellow card) 47'; Hanca (yellow card) 61'; Pešić (yellow card) 65'; Salomão (yellow card) 84' | Report | | Stadium: Dinamo; Attendance: 522; Referee: Marius Avram |

| 20 December 2018 21 | Astra Giurgiu | 4–1 | Dinamo București | Giurgiu |
| 20:00 EET (UTC+2) | Mrzljak (yellow card) 4'; Llullaku 7'; L.Buş 36'; M.Butean (yellow card) 41'; Bègue (yellow card) 63'; V.Gheorghe 68'; N.Roșu 71' | Report | Zenke (yellow card) 33'; Hanca 77' | Stadium: Marin Anastasovici; Attendance: 2,000; Referee: Radu Petrescu |

| 2 February 2019 22 | Dinamo București | 3–0 | Politehnica Iași | Bucharest |
| EET (UTC+2) | Montini 7', 69'; Filip (yellow card) 29'; Klimavičius (yellow card) 36'; R.Grigore (yellow card) 59'; Nistor (yellow card) 81'; D.Popa 90+3' | Report | Gardoș (yellow card) 80'; Qaka (yellow card) 82' | Stadium: Dinamo; Attendance: 2,860; Referee: Horațiu Feșnic (Cluj) |

| 9 February 2019 23 | Sepsi Sfântu Gheorghe | 0–1 | Dinamo București | Sfântu Gheorghe |
| EET (UTC+2) | Hamed (yellow card) 19'; Viera (yellow card) 28'; Jovanović (yellow card) 56'; Ștefan (yellow card) 86' | Report | Zenke (yellow card) 46'; Rachid (yellow card) 52'; Nistor 57' (pen.); N'Diaye (yellow card) 65'; Montini (yellow card) 67'; D.Sorescu (yellow card) 82'; Aliji (yellow card) 90+2' | Stadium: Municipal; Attendance: 4,500; Referee: Sebastian Colțescu |

| 16 February 2019 24 | Dinamo București | 1–2 | Botoșani | Bucharest |
| EET (UTC+2) | Montini 24'; Rachid (yellow card) 31'; R.Grigore (yellow card) 33'; Filip (yellow card) 45'; Aliji (yellow card) 54' | Report | Golofca 28'; Fabbrini 75'; Burcă (yellow card) 81'; Rodríguez (yellow card) 90+2'; Fraisl (yellow card) 90+4' | Stadium: Dinamo; Attendance: 5,728; Referee: Ovidiu Hațegan |

| 23 February 2019 25 | Dunărea Călărași | 0–0 | Dinamo București | Călărași |
| EET (UTC+2) | | Report | | Stadium: Ion Comșa; Attendance: 3,500; Referee: Ionuţ Coza |

| 3 March 2019 26 | Dinamo București | 2–1 | Concordia Chiajna | Bucharest |
| EET (UTC+2) | Rachid (yellow card) 36'; Papazoglou 39' (yellow card) 78'; D.Sorescu 66' | Report | Ropotan (yellow card) 10' (goal) 69'; Gorobsov (yellow card) 73'; Moussa (yellow card) 81'; Grădinaru (yellow card) 82' | Stadium: Dinamo; Attendance: 955; Referee: Andrei Chivulete |

==== Relegation round ====
===== Table =====
| Pos | Team | Pld | W | D | L | GF | GA | GD | Pts | Qualification or relegation |
|---|---|---|---|---|---|---|---|---|---|---|
| 7 | Gaz Metan Mediaș | 14 | 10 | 2 | 2 | 25 | 9 | +16 | 48 | |
| 8 | Botoșani | 14 | 8 | 2 | 4 | 18 | 9 | +9 | 44 | |
| 9 | Dinamo București | 14 | 8 | 3 | 3 | 16 | 7 | +9 | 43 | |
| 10 | Politehnica Iași | 14 | 3 | 5 | 6 | 12 | 18 | −6 | 31 | |
| 11 | Voluntari | 14 | 5 | 5 | 4 | 14 | 16 | −2 | 31 | |
| 12 | Hermannstadt (O) | 14 | 2 | 5 | 7 | 9 | 19 | −10 | 27 | Qualification for the relegation play-offs |
| 13 | Dunărea Călărași (R) | 14 | 3 | 4 | 7 | 8 | 18 | −10 | 25 | Relegation to Liga II |
| 14 | Concordia Chiajna (R) | 14 | 2 | 4 | 8 | 17 | 23 | −6 | 19 | Relegation to Liga II |

Source: Soccerway
Rules for classification: 1) Points; 2) Points without rounding; 3) Head-to-head points; 4) Head-to-head goal difference; 5) Head-to-head goals scored; 6) Goal difference; 7) Goals scored; 8) Play-off (only if needed to decide teams for relegation). (Note: only criteria 6 and 7 are applied to establish the classification during the competition.)
(O) Play-off winners; (R) Relegated

===== Results summary =====
| Overall | | | | | | | | Home | | | | | | Away | | | | | |
| Pld | W | D | L | GF | GA | GD | Pts | W | D | L | GF | GA | GD | W | D | L | GF | GA | GD |
|---|---|---|---|---|---|---|---|---|---|---|---|---|---|---|---|---|---|---|---|
| 14 | 8 | 3 | 3 | 16 | 7 | +9 | 27 | 5 | 2 | 0 | 10 | 2 | +8 | 3 | 1 | 3 | 6 | 5 | +1 |

Last updated: 31 May 2019.
Source: Liga I

===== Position by round =====
| Round | 1 | 2 | 3 | 4 | 5 | 6 | 7 | 8 | 9 | 10 | 11 | 12 | 13 | 14 |
|---|---|---|---|---|---|---|---|---|---|---|---|---|---|---|
| Ground | H | A | H | H | A | H | A | A | H | A | A | H | A | H |
| Result | W | L | W | W | W | W | W | L | W | D | W | D | L | D |
| Position | 7 | 9 | 8 | 8 | 8 | 8 | 8 | 8 | 8 | 8 | 7 | 8 | 8 | 9 |

Updated to match(es) played on 31 May 2019. Source: Liga I
A = Away; H = Home; W = Win; D = Draw; L = Loss

===== Matches =====
Win Draw Loss

| 8 March 2019 1 | Dinamo București | 2–0 | Dunărea Călărași | Bucharest |
| | Nistor 24'; Zenke (yellow card) 70'; Popa (yellow card) 82'; Montini 90+4' | Report | Filip (yellow card) 71'; Iancu (yellow card) 84' | Stadium: Dinamo; Attendance: 963; Referee: Marius Avram |

| 17 March 2019 2 | Gaz Metan Mediaș | 2–1 | Dinamo București | Mediaș |
| | Rondón 11'; Crețu (yellow card) 49'; David Caiado 58'; Bușu (yellow card) 65' | Report | Papazoglou 4'; Jaadi (yellow card) 34'; Klimavičius (yellow card) 57' | Stadium: Gaz Metan; Attendance: 4,500; Referee: Marian Barbu |

| 29 March 2019 3 | Dinamo București | 2–0 | Hermannstadt | Bucharest |
| | Nistor (yellow card) 7'; Montini 12'; Klimavičius 16'; Sorescu (yellow card) 38'; Dussaut (yellow card) 70' | Report | Pârvulescu (yellow card) 23'; Offenbacher (yellow card) 49' | Stadium: Dinamo; Attendance: 1,011; Referee: Cătălin Popa |

| 5 April 2019 4 | Dinamo București | 3–2 | Concordia Chiajna | Bucharest |
| | Zenke (yellow card) 18' (goal) 56'; Papazoglou 28' 48'; Dussault (yellow card) 39'; Jaadi (yellow card) 75' | Report | Gorobsov (yellow card) 22'; Ivanovici 68'; Albu (yellow card) 74'; Nivaldo (yellow card) 90+2'; Tha'er Bawab 90+3' | Stadium: Dinamo; Attendance: 1,146; Referee: Adrian Comănescu |

| 12 April 2019 5 | Politehnica Iași | 0–1 | Dinamo București | Iași |
| | Sanoh (yellow card) 15' (yellow-red card) 63'; Rus (yellow card) 51'; Qaka (yellow card) 76' | Report | Ciobotariu (yellow card) 31'; Sorescu (yellow card) 39'; Nistor 52' (pen.); Jaadi (red card) 67'; Muțiu (yellow card) 79'; Aliji (yellow card) 90+1' | Stadium: Emil Alexandrescu; Attendance: 3,500; Referee: Andrei Chivulete |

| 22 April 2019 6 | Dinamo București | 1–0 | Botoșani | Bucharest |
| | Sorescu (yellow card) 9'; N'Diaye (yellow card) 36' (goal) 88'; Papazoglou (yellow card) 37' | Report | Miron (yellow card) 23'; Papa (yellow card) 86'; Fraisl (yellow card) 88' | Stadium: Dinamo; Attendance: 1,280; Referee: Iulian Dima |

| 27 April 2019 7 | Voluntari | 1–2 | Dinamo București | Voluntari |
| | Laïdouni (yellow card) 72'; Gadze (yellow card) 85'; Tudorie 90+3' | Report | Montini (yellow card) 1' (goal) 89'; Șerban (yellow card) 13'; Nistor (yellow card) 79'; Grigore 80'; Aliji (yellow card) 85' | Stadium: Anghel Iordănescu; Attendance: 2,200; Referee: Iulian Călin |

| 4 May 2019 8 | Dunărea Călărași | 1–0 | Dinamo București | Călărași |
| | Luchin (yellow card) 43'; Dobrosavlevici (yellow card) 59'; Ammari 70' (yellow card) 70'; Simion (yellow card) 76'; Enache (red card) 82'; Benzar (yellow card) 90+1'; Straton (yellow card) 90+3' | Report | N'Diaye (yellow card) 75'; Dussaut (yellow card) 79'; Grigore (red card) 82'; Aliji (yellow card) 83' | Stadium: Ion Comșa; Attendance: 3,500; Referee: Marcel Bîrsan |

| 10 May 2019 9 | Dinamo București | 2–0 | Gaz Metan Mediaș | Bucharest |
| | Klimavičius (yellow card) 20'; Filip (yellow card) 28'; Aliji (yellow card) 40'; Montini 56' 80'; Mallo (yellow card) 74'; Dussaut (yellow card) 83' (yellow-red card) 87' | Report | David Caiado (yellow card) 31'; Fofana (yellow card) 36'; Luís Aurélio (yellow card) 51'; Rondón (yellow card) 90+3' | Stadium: Dinamo; Attendance: 841; Referee: Florin Andrei |

| 15 May 2019 10 | Hermannstadt | 0–0 | Dinamo București | Sibiu |
| | Blănaru (yellow card) 57'; Dâlbea (yellow card) 69' | Report | Montini (yellow card) 49'; Sorescu (yellow card) 90+1' | Stadium: Municipal; Attendance: 4,500; Referee: Marius Avram |

| 18 May 2019 11 | Concordia Chiajna | 0–2 | Dinamo București | Chiajna |
| | Radu (yellow card) 64' | Report | Grigore (yellow card) 41'; Montini 59'; Jaadi 75' | Stadium: Concordia; Attendance: 1,000; Referee: Marian Barbu |

| 22 May 2019 12 | Dinamo București | 0–0 | Politehnica Iași | Bucharest |
| | Grigore (yellow card) 11'; Nistor (yellow card) 19' | Report | Platini (yellow card) 21'; Bădic (yellow card) 59'; Filipe Nascimento (yellow card) 64'; Rubén Miño (yellow card) 85' | Stadium: Dinamo; Attendance: 1,150; Referee: Adrian Cojocaru |

| 27 May 2019 13 | Botoșani | 1–0 | Dinamo București | Botoșani |
| | Roman 8'; Golofca (yellow card) 57' | Report | Grigore (yellow card) 41'; Zenke (yellow card) 50' | Stadium: Municipal; Attendance: 3,000; Referee: Ionu Coza |

| 31 May 2019 14 | Dinamo București | 0–0 | Voluntari | Bucharest |
| | Klimavičius (yellow card) 67' | Report | | Stadium: Dinamo; Attendance: 150; Referee: Sebastian Colțescu |

=== Cupa României ===
Dinamo București will enter the Cupa României at the Round of 32.

| 25 September 2018 Round of 32 | Dacia Unirea Brăila | 1–3 | Dinamo București | Galați |
| 21:30 | Mihai Maxin 21'; Lü Yuefeng (yellow card) 33' (yellow-red card) 68' | Report | Grigore 6'; Nistor 8' 71'; Sorescu (yellow card) 38' (yellow-red card) 88'; Popescu (yellow card) 61'; Ciobotariu (yellow card) 65'; Popa (yellow card) 73' | Stadium: Stadionul Oțelul; Attendance: 2,500; Referee: Florin Andrei |

| 1 November 2018 Round of 16 | Miercurea Ciuc | 3–3 (a.e.t.) (6–5 p) | Dinamo București | Miercurea Ciuc |
| 19:00 | Adrián Majzik 48'; Szilárd Magyari 52' (yellow card) 85'; Attila Csürös (yellow card) 68'; Berde (yellow card) 75' (goal) 114'; Arthur Györgyi (yellow card) 78' (yellow-red card) 112'; Eder González (red card) 120+21' | Report | Olteanu (yellow card) 45+1'; Hanca (yellow card) 47'; Nistor 54' 59' (yellow card) 76'; Neicuțescu 106'; Katsikas (yellow card) 109' | Stadium: Stadionul Municipal; Attendance: 2,000; Referee: Sorin Antonie |

== See also ==
- 2018–19 Cupa României
- 2018–19 Liga I
