= Georgios Koutroumpis =

Greek footballer (born 1991)

Giorgos Koutroumpis
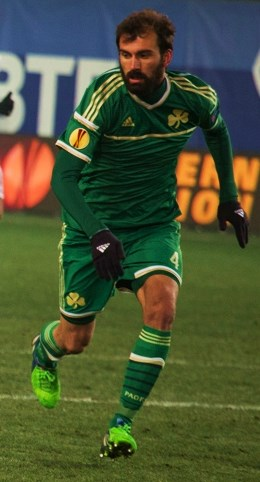

Personal information
- Date of birth: 10 February 1991 (age 35)
- Place of birth: Athens, Greece
- Height: 1.90 m (6 ft 3 in)
- Position: Centre-back

Team information
- Current team: Chania
- Number: 13

Senior career*
Years	Team	Apps	(Gls)
2010–2012	Kallithea	50	(0)
2012–2013	AEK Athens	29	(1)
2013–2018	Panathinaikos	93	(2)
2018	Standard Liège	7	(0)
2019	Concordia Chiajna	9	(0)
2019–2020	OFI	26	(0)
2020–2022	Újpest	48	(0)
2022–2024	Bandirmaspor	31	(0)
2025	Ilioupoli	4	(0)
2025–	Chania	23	(0)

International career
2009–2010	Greece U19	3	(0)
- * Club domestic league appearances and goals as of 25 April 2026

Georgios Koutroumpis (Greek: Γεώργιος Κουτρουμπής; born 10 February 1991) is a Greek professional footballer who plays as a centre-back for Super League 2 club Chania.

== Club career ==
Born in Athens, Koutroumpis started his professional career in the Football League playing for Kallithea. On 9 August 2012, with a personal interference from ex AEK Athens president and major shareholder Dimitris Melissanidis, signed a four years' contract with AEK Athens for an undisclosed fee. After AEK Athens' relegation, Koutroumpis due to his club financial problems, asked for his contract to be solved, trying to sign with rivals Panathinaikos.

=== Panathinaikos ===
Koutroumpis could not be officially announced by Panathinaikos, because he still had a contract with AEK Athens. On June 26, 2013, he participated in Panathinaikos first training session for the 2013–14 season. On July 2, 2013, he filed an appeal against AEK Athens, in order to get whatever the team owed to him. On the same day, he travelled to the Netherlands and Osterberg, in order to take part in Panathinaikos' summer preparation. On 17 July 2013, it was officially announced that Koutroubis had signed a four-years contract with Panathinaikos.

In summer 2016, Adanaspor are monitoring the case of Panathinaikos' 25-year-old central defender Koutroumpis, whose current contract expires at summer of 2017. On 6 October 2016, negotiations started for the extension of his contract. Koutroumpis is among the players Panathinaikos wish to tie up at the club as the two parties has begun negotiations over a new deal and the Greens are willing to offer an improved salary to the 25-year-old central defender, whose current contract expires at the end of 2016–2017 season, in order to keep him in their squad. Italian manager of Panathinaikos Andrea Stramaccioni will handle personally the case of Giorgos Koutroubis' contract extension until the summer of 2019. Eventually, on 15 October 2016, the current contract of 25-year-old player that expired at summer of 2017, will be extended until that of 2019, with better financial terms (€250,000 per year) and a buy-out clause of €1,6 million.

On 21 October 2016, the directors of Trabzonspor are monitoring the case of Panathinaikos' defender, despite the fact that the new contract with the Greens expires at summer of 2019. On 10 September 2017, Marinos Ouzounidis named the international defender as the new captain of the club for the 2017–18 season. On 15 December 2017, the administration of Panathinaikos announced to Koutroumpis that he will be released from the financially struggling Greens in January 2018. The 26-year-old international central defender joined the historic Athens club from AEK back in the summer of 2013 and his current contract with experienced manager Marinos Ouzounidis' team expires in June 2019.

=== Standard Liège ===
On 31 January 2018, Koutroumpis signed as a free agent, a six months contract (with an option for an additional year) with Belgian club Standard Liège for an undisclosed fee. On 11 February 2018, he made his debut with the club as a starter in an anxious 4–3 win against Royal Excel Mouscron.

On 17 March 2018, he played as Standard Liège beat Genk 1–0 in extra time to win the 2018 Belgian Cup Final and qualify for the UEFA Europa League. At the end of the season he mutually solved his contract with the club.

=== Concordia Chiajna ===
On 12 February 2019, Koutroumpis signed a 6-month contract with Romanian club CS Concordia Chiajna.

=== OFI ===
On 30 August 2019, Koutroumpis signed a 2-years contract with Super League club OFI. At the end of the season, he mutually solved his contract with the club.

=== Újpest ===
On 24 September 2020, Koutroumpis signed a year contract with NB I club Újpest. On 3 May 2021, he played as a starter as his club beat MOL Vidi FC 1–0 to win the Magyar Kupa and qualify for the UEFA Europa Conference League.

== Career statistics ==
As of 28 February 2022

Club	Season	League			Cup		Europe*		Other**		Total	
Club	Season	Division	Apps	Goals	Apps	Goals	Apps	Goals	Apps	Goals	Apps	Goals
Kallithea	2010-11	Football League	21	0	0	0	—		—		21	0
Kallithea	2011-12	Football League	29	0	1	0	—		—		30	0
Kallithea	Total		50	0	1	0	—		—		51	0
AEK Athens	2012-13	Super League Greece	29	1	1	0	—		—		30	1
AEK Athens	Total		29	1	1	0	—		—		30	1
Panathinaikos	2013-14	Super League Greece	25	2	6	0	0	0	6	0	37	2
Panathinaikos	2014-15	Super League Greece	18	0	2	0	6	0	6	0	32	0
Panathinaikos	2015-16	Super League Greece	18	0	4	0	4	0	6	0	32	0
Panathinaikos	2016-17	Super League Greece	22	0	6	0	10	0	6	0	44	0
Panathinaikos	2017-18	Super League Greece	10	0	1	0	2	0	0	0	13	0
Panathinaikos	Total		93	2	19	0	22	0	24	0	158	2
Standard Liège	2017-18	Belgian First Division A	7	0	1	0	—		—		8	0
Standard Liège	Total		7	0	1	0	—		—		8	0
Concordia Chiajna	2018-19	Liga I	9	0	0	0	—		—		9	0
Concordia Chiajna	Total		9	0	0	0	—		—		9	0
OFI	2019-20	Super League Greece	26	0	3	0	—		—		29	0
OFI	Total		26	0	3	0	—		—		29	0
Újpest	2020-21	Nemzeti Bajnokság I	18	0	4	0	—		—		22	0
Újpest	2021-22	Nemzeti Bajnokság I	22	0	0	0	4	0	—		26	0
Újpest	Total		40	0	4	0	4	0	—		48	0
Career total			254	3	29	0	26	0	24	0	333	3

(* Includes UEFA Europa League and UEFA Champions League) (** Includes Super League Play-offs )

== Honours ==
Panathinaikos

- Greek Football Cup: 2013–14

Standard Liège

- Belgian Cup: 2017–18

Újpest

- Magyar Kupa: 2020–21
