= Andrei Radu =

Andrei Radu may refer to:

- Andrei Radu (footballer, born 1996), Romanian defender
- Ionuț Radu, Romanian goalkeeper also known as Andrei Radu
