= Adrian Briciu =

Romanian footballer (born 2007)

Personal information
- Full name: George Adrian Briciu
- Date of birth: 5 June 2007 (age 19)
- Place of birth: Bucharest, Romania
- Height: 1.92 m (6 ft 4 in)
- Position: Goalkeeper

Team information
- Current team: Concordia Chiajna
- Number: 1

Youth career
- 2013–2018: Școala de Fotbal Dănuț Coman
- 2016–2018: → Argeș Pitești (loan)
- 2018–2019: Viitorul Argeș Alexandru Duminică
- 2019–2021: Marcea Sport
- 2021–2024: Argeș Pitești
- 2024–2026: Rapid București

Senior career*
Years	Team	Apps	(Gls)
2025–2026	Rapid București	1	(0)
2026–	Concordia Chiajna	9	(0)

International career
2022	Romania U16	1	(0)
- * Club domestic league appearances and goals as of 10 October 2026

George Adrian Briciu (born 5 June 2007) is a Romanian professional footballer who plays as a goalkeeper for Liga II club Concordia Chiajna.

He made his professional debut against club rivals Dinamo București.

== Career statistics ==
As of match played 29 October 2026

Appearances and goals by club, season and competition
Club	Season	League			Cupa României		Europe		Other		Total	
Club	Season	Division	Apps	Goals	Apps	Goals	Apps	Goals	Apps	Goals	Apps	Goals
Rapid București	2025–26	Liga I	1	0	0	0	—		—		1	0
Concordia Chiajna	2026–27	Liga II	9	0	2	0	—		—		11	0
Career total			10	0	2	0	—		—		12	0
