= Alexandru Greab =

Romanian footballer

Personal information
- Full name: Alexandru Doru Greab
- Date of birth: 26 May 1992 (age 34)
- Place of birth: Bistrița, Romania
- Height: 1.98 m (6 ft 6 in)
- Position: Goalkeeper

Team information
- Current team: Gloria Bistrița
- Number: 22

Youth career
- 2000–2011: Gloria Bistrița

Senior career*
Years	Team	Apps	(Gls)
2011–2012	Gloria Bistrița	0	(0)
2012–2018	Gaz Metan Mediaș	74	(0)
2018–2020	Concordia Chiajna	28	(0)
2020	Sepsi OSK	0	(0)
2020–2023	Argeș Pitești	70	(0)
2023	Mioveni	13	(0)
2023–2025	Gloria Buzău	37	(0)
2025–	Gloria Bistrița	23	(0)
- * Club domestic league appearances and goals as of 24 October 2026

Alexandru Doru Greab (born 26 May 1992) is a Romanian professional footballer who plays as a goalkeeper for Liga II club Gloria Bistrița, which he captains.

== Honours ==
Gaz Metan Mediaș

- Liga II: 2015–16
