= Răzvan Grădinaru =

Romanian footballer

Personal information
- Full name: Răzvan Toni Augustin Grădinaru
- Date of birth: 23 August 1995 (age 31)
- Place of birth: Zimnicea, Romania
- Height: 1.80 m (5 ft 11 in)
- Position: Midfielder

Team information
- Current team: Unirea Slobozia
- Number: 8

Youth career
- 2007–2009: Dinamo București
- 2009–2013: Steaua București

Senior career*
Years	Team	Apps	(Gls)
2013–2016	Steaua București	6	(0)
2014–2015	→ Oțelul Galați (loan)	18	(0)
2015–2016	→ Concordia Chiajna (loan)	14	(0)
2016–2019	Concordia Chiajna	113	(6)
2020	Politehnica Iași	17	(0)
2020–2021	Voluntari	15	(1)
2021	Viitorul Constanța	20	(0)
2021–2022	Gaz Metan Mediaș	23	(0)
2022	Dinamo București	11	(0)
2022–2024	Karmiotissa	56	(0)
2024	Concordia Chiajna	1	(0)
2024–2025	Karmiotissa	20	(0)
2025–2026	CSM Reșița	25	(2)
2026–	Unirea Slobozia	12	(0)

International career
2015–2016	Romania U21	1	(0)
- * Club domestic league appearances and goals as of 31 October 2026

Răzvan Toni Augustin Grădinaru (born 23 August 1995) is a Romanian professional footballer who plays as a midfielder for Liga II club Unirea Slobozia.

== Club career ==
=== Steaua București ===
He made his league debut on 16 April 2014 in Liga I match against FC Vaslui.

=== Politehnica Iași ===
On 12 January 2020, Liga I club FC Politehnica Iași announced the singing of Grădinaru.

== Career statistics ==
As of match played 31 October 2026

Appearances and goals by club, season and competition
Club	Season	League			National cup (Note: Includes Cupa României, Cypriot Cup)		League cup (Note: Includes Cupa Ligii)		Europe		Other		Total	
Club	Season	Division	Apps	Goals	Apps	Goals	Apps	Goals	Apps	Goals	Apps	Goals	Apps	Goals
Steaua București	2013–14	Liga I	2	0	1	0	—		—		—		3	0
Steaua București	2014–15	Liga I	2	0	0	0	1	0	1 (Note: Appearance in UEFA Champions League)	0	0	0	4	0
Steaua București	2015–16	Liga I	2	0	0	0	0	0	0	0	1 (Note: Appearance in Supercupa României)	0	3	0
Steaua București	Total		6	0	1	0	1	0	1	0	1	0	10	0
Oțelul Galați (loan)	2014–15	Liga I	18	0	2	0	0	0	—		—		20	0
Concordia Chiajna (loan)	2015–16	Liga I	14	0	2	0	1	0	—		—		17	0
Concordia Chiajna	2016–17	Liga I	34	3	0	0	2	0	—		—		36	3
Concordia Chiajna	2017–18	Liga I	35	2	0	0	—		—		—		35	2
Concordia Chiajna	2018–19	Liga I	35	1	1	0	—		—		—		36	1
Concordia Chiajna	2019–20	Liga II	9	0	1	0	—		—		—		10	0
Concordia Chiajna	Total		127	6	4	0	3	0	—		—		134	6
Politehnica Iași	2019–20	Liga I	17	0	2	0	—		—		—		19	0
Voluntari	2020–21	Liga I	15	1	1	0	—		—		—		16	1
Viitorul Constanța	2020–21	Liga I	20	0	0	0	—		—		—		20	0
Gaz Metan Mediaș	2021–22	Liga I	23	0	2	0	—		—		—		25	0
Dinamo București	2021–22	Liga I	11	0	—		—		—		1	0	12	0
Karmiotissa	2022–23	Cypriot First Division	21	0	0	0	—		—		—		21	0
Karmiotissa	2023–24	Cypriot First Division	35	0	1	0	—		—		—		36	0
Karmiotissa	Total		56	0	1	0	—		—		—		57	0
Concordia Chiajna	2024–25	Liga II	1	0	—		—		—		—		1	0
Karmiotissa	2024–25	Cypriot First Division	20	0	1	0	—		—		—		21	0
CSM Reșița	2025–26	Liga II	25	2	1	0	—		—		—		26	2
Unirea Slobozia	2026–27	Liga II	12	0	2	1	—		—		—		14	1
Career total			351	9	17	1	4	0	1	0	2	0	375	10

== Honours ==
Steaua București

- Liga I: 2013–14
- Cupa României runner-up: 2013–14
- Supercupa României runner-up: 2014, 2015

Concordia Chiajna

- Cupa Ligii runner-up: 2015–16
