= Nivaldo (footballer, born July 1988) =

Cape Verdean footballer (born 1988)

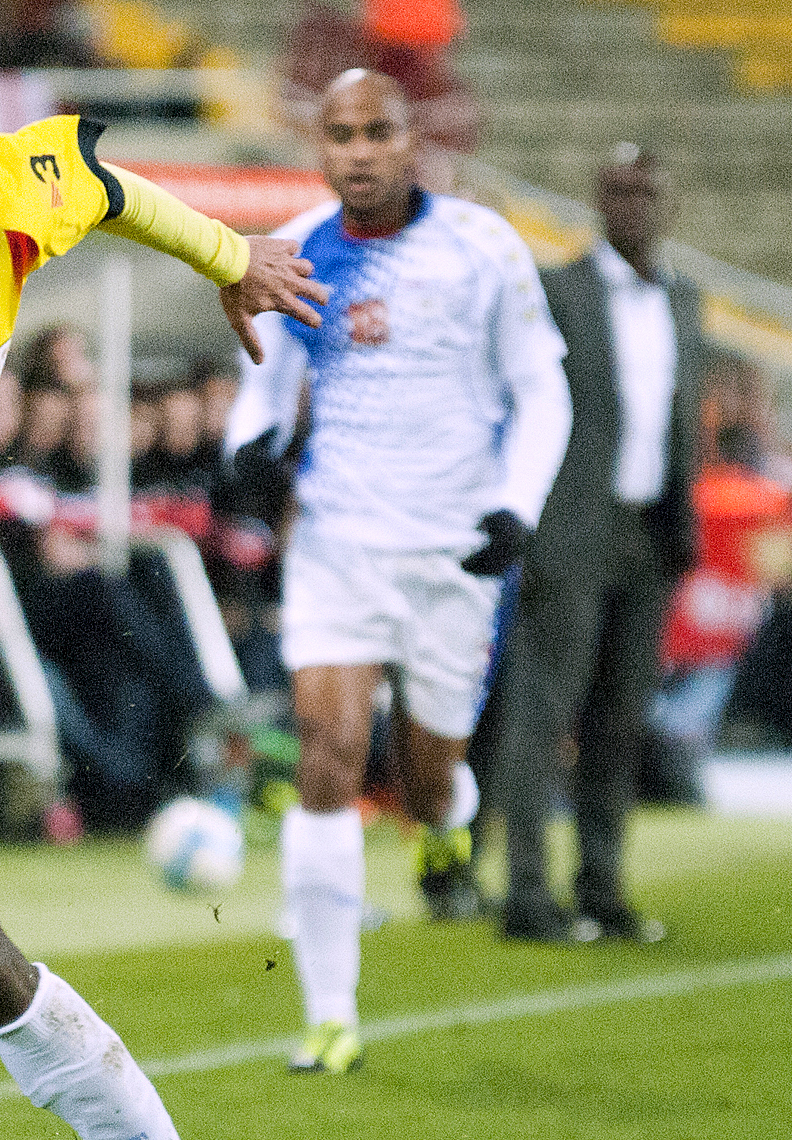

Personal information
- Full name: Nivaldo Alves Freitas Santos
- Date of birth: 10 July 1988 (age 38)
- Place of birth: São Nicolau, Cape Verde
- Height: 1.79 m (5 ft 10 in)
- Positions: Midfielder; left back

Youth career
- 2006–2007: Académica

Senior career*
Years	Team	Apps	(Gls)
2005–2006	Batuque		
2007–2008	Caniçal	17	(0)
2008–2009	Fátima	8	(0)
2009–2010	Ribeirão	29	(2)
2010–2011	Tourizense	30	(2)
2011–2013	Académica	19	(0)
2013–2015	Teplice	48	(7)
2015	Dinamo Minsk	8	(1)
2016–2017	Teplice	20	(1)
2018–2020	Concordia Chiajna	39	(3)
2020–2022	Anadia	48	(3)
2022	Académica	6	(0)
2023–2024	União de Coimbra	21	(0)

International career
2011–2018	Cape Verde	21	(0)
- * Club domestic league appearances and goals as of 31 May 2024

Nivaldo Alves Freitas Santos (born 10 July 1988), known as Nivaldo, is a Cape Verdean professional footballer who plays as a left midfielder and left back.

== Club career ==
Born in São Nicolau, Nivaldo started playing football in his country with Batuque FC. Aged 18, he moved to Portugal to complete his development, joining Académica de Coimbra for his last year as a junior. From ages 19–23, Nivaldo competed solely in the Portuguese third division, representing C.F. Caniçal, C.D. Fátima, G.D. Ribeirão and G.D. Tourizense.

On 16 August 2011, Nivaldo returned to Académica and thus moved straight into the Primeira Liga, signing a three-year contract with the Students. He made his debut in the competition on 12 September by coming in as a 62nd-minute substitute in a 4–0 home win against C.D. Nacional, but spent most of his two-year spell with the side as understudy to Hélder Cabral. He moved to the Czech Republic in summer 2013, joining FK Teplice. In January 2016, after a brief spell in the Belarusian Premier League, he returned to his previous club.

== Honours ==
Académica

- Taça de Portugal: 2011–12
