= Nicușor Fota =

Romanian footballer

Personal information
- Date of birth: 1 December 1996 (age 29)
- Place of birth: Caracal, Romania
- Height: 1.69 m (5 ft 7 in)
- Position: Full-back

Team information
- Current team: Popești-Leordeni
- Number: 27

Youth career
- CSȘ Caracal
- –2015: Concordia Chiajna

Senior career*
Years	Team	Apps	(Gls)
2015–2021	Concordia Chiajna	67	(0)
2016–2021	Concordia II Chiajna	15	(1)
2016	→ Rapid București (loan)	15	(0)
2016	→ Academica Clinceni (loan)	9	(0)
2021–2026	CSM Reșița	89	(4)
2026–	Popești-Leordeni	0	(0)
- * Club domestic league appearances and goals as of 14 March 2026

Nicușor Fota (born 1 December 1996) is a Romanian professional footballer who plays as a full-back for Liga II club Popești-Leordeni.

== Honours ==
Rapid București

- Liga II: 2015–16

CSM Reșița

- Liga III: 2021–22, 2022–23
