= Andrei Radu (footballer, born 1996) =

Romanian footballer

Personal information
- Date of birth: 21 June 1996 (age 30)
- Place of birth: Bucharest, Romania
- Height: 1.77 m (5 ft 10 in)
- Position: Left-back

Youth career
- 2003–2011: Steaua București
- 2011–2013: Dinamo București

Senior career*
Years	Team	Apps	(Gls)
2012–2013	Dinamo II București	9	(0)
2013–2016	Dinamo București	1	(0)
2014–2015	→ Academica Argeș (loan)	3	(0)
2015–2016	→ Berceni (loan)	28	(1)
2016–2018	Aris Limassol	45	(0)
2018–2020	CFR Cluj	1	(0)
2019	→ Concordia Chiajna (loan)	11	(0)
2019–2020	→ Politehnica Iași (loan)	17	(0)
2020–2022	Dinamo București	43	(0)
2023	PAS Giannina	2	(0)
2024–2025	AFC Câmpulung Muscel	10	(0)

International career
2013	Romania U17	2	(0)
2013	Romania U18	4	(0)
2017–2018	Romania U21	10	(0)
- * Club domestic league appearances and goals as of 10 May 2025

Andrei Radu (Romanian pronunciation: [anˈdrej ˈradu]; born 21 June 1996) is a Romanian professional footballer who plays as a left-back.

== Career ==
=== PAS Giannina ===
In February 2023 he moved to PAS Giannina in Super League Greece.

== Personal life ==
He is the cousin of goalkeeper Andrei Ionuț Radu.

== Career statistics ==
As of match played 10 May 2025

Appearances and goals by club, season and competition
Club	Season	League			National cup (Note: Includes Cupa României)		Europe		Other		Total	
Club	Season	Division	Apps	Goals	Apps	Goals	Apps	Goals	Apps	Goals	Apps	Goals
Dinamo II București	2012–13	Liga II	9	0	—		—		—		9	0
Dinamo București	2012–13	Liga I	1	0	—		—		—		1	0
Academica Argeș (loan)	2014–15	Liga II	3	0	0	0	—		—		3	0
Berceni (loan)	2015–16	Liga II	28	1	1	0	—		—		29	1
Aris Limassol	2016–17	Cypriot First Division	24	0	2	0	—		—		26	0
Aris Limassol	2017–18	Cypriot First Division	21	0	0	0	—		—		21	0
Aris Limassol	Total		45	0	2	0	—		—		47	0
CFR Cluj	2018–19	Liga I	1	0	1	0	0	0	0	0	2	0
Concordia Chiajna (loan)	2018–19	Liga I	11	0	—		—		—		11	0
Politehnica Iași (loan)	2019–20	Liga I	17	0	0	0	—		—		17	0
Dinamo București	2020–21	Liga I	16	0	1	1	—		—		17	1
Dinamo București	2021–22	Liga I	27	0	2	0	—		1 (Note: Appearance in Liga I promotion/relegation play-offs)	0	30	0
Dinamo București	Total		43	0	3	1	—		1	0	47	1
PAS Giannina	2022–23	Super League Greece	2	0	—		—		—		2	0
AFC Câmpulung Muscel	2024–25	Liga II	10	0	—		—		—		10	0
Career total			170	1	7	1	0	0	1	0	178	2

== Honours ==
CFR Cluj

- Supercupa României: 2018
