= Alessandro Caparco =

Italian footballer (born 1983)

Personal information
- Date of birth: 7 September 1983 (age 43)
- Place of birth: Moncalieri, Italy
- Height: 1.80 m (5 ft 11 in)
- Position: Goalkeeper

Youth career
- –2000: Juventus
- 2001–2002: Torino

Senior career*
Years	Team	Apps	(Gls)
2000–2001	Moncalieri	10	(0)
2001–2002	Torino	0	(0)
2002–2008	Ivrea	131	(0)
2008–2010	Grosseto	19	(0)
2010–2013	ASA Târgu Mureş	16	(0)
2014–2017	Politehnica Iași	48	(0)
2017–2019	Concordia Chiajna	38	(0)
2019	Dunărea Călărași	0	(0)
2020	Politehnica Iași	0	(0)
Total		244	(0)

Managerial career
- 2020–2021: Voluntari (GK coach)
- 2022–2025: Dinamo București (GK coach)
- * Club domestic league appearances and goals

Alessandro Caparco (born 7 September 1983) is an Italian former professional footballer who played as a goalkeeper.

== Club career ==
Born in Moncalieri, Caparco started his career at lowly A.S.D. Moncalieri Calcio, and subsequently spent five years at A.S.D. Montalto Ivrea. In 2008, he moved to Serie B team U.S. Grosseto F.C., and played 19 games in his two-season spell.

=== Romania ===
In September 2010 the free agent Caparco moved abroad for the first time in his career, joining Liga I team FCM Târgu Mureş. He appeared regularly for the side but left the club in December 2013, and signed for Politehnica Iași in Liga II in the following month.

Ahead of the 2019–20 season, Caparco joined FC Dunărea Călărași.

== Honours ==
Ivrea

- Serie D: 2002–03

CSMS Iași

- Liga II: 2013–14
