= Dinamo Stadium (1951) =

Romanian stadium

- Stadionul Dinamo
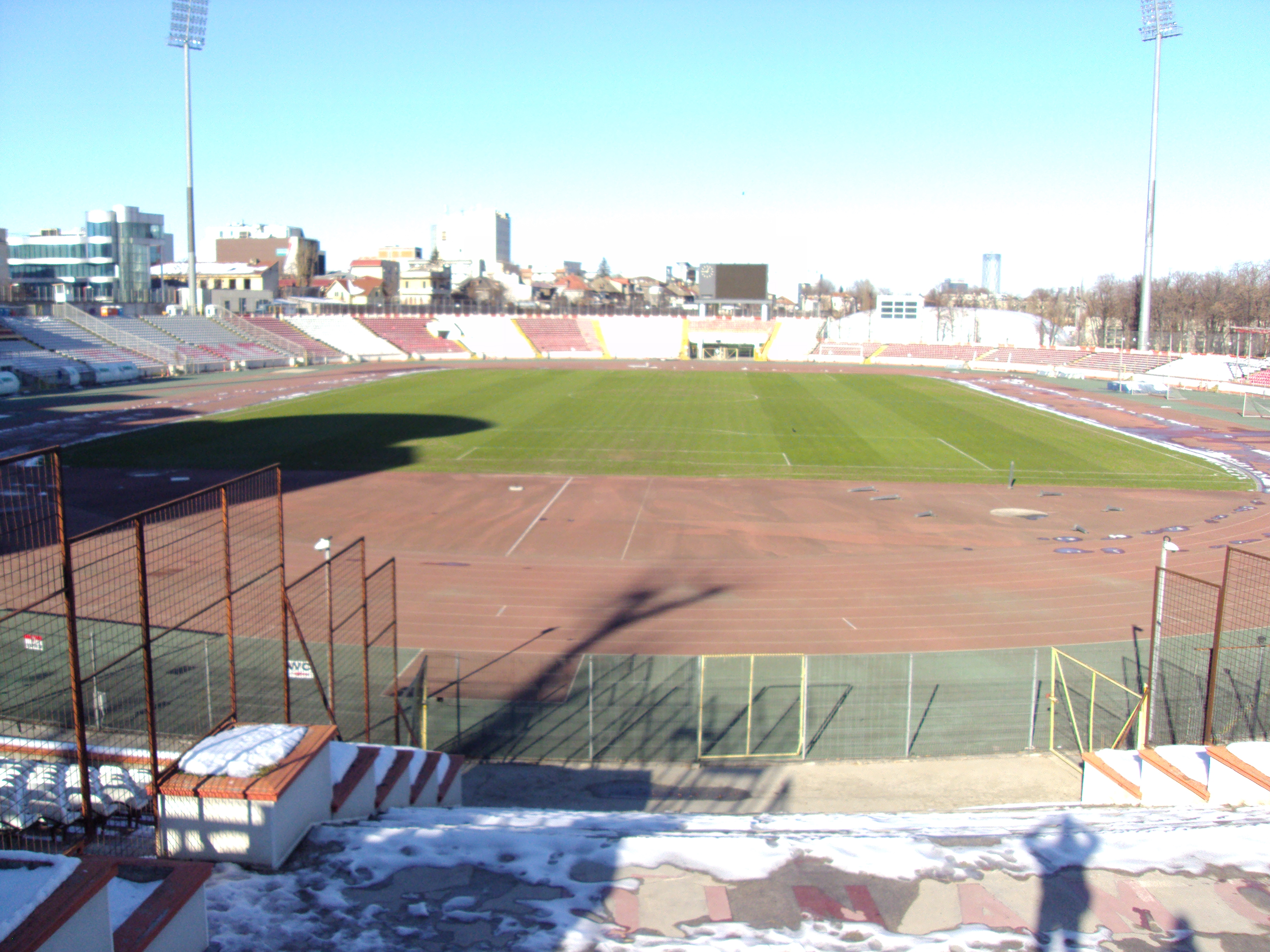
- The venue in 2012
- Interactive map of Dinamo Stadium
- Address: Şoseaua Ştefan cel Mare, nr. 7-9
- Location: Bucharest, Romania
- Coordinates: 44°27′18.30″N 26°6′08.80″E
- Owner: Ministry of Internal Affairs
- Operator: CS Dinamo București
- Capacity: 15,032
- Surface: grass
- Field size: 105 x 65m

Construction
- Opened: 1951
- Renovated: 2001, 2008

Tenants
- Dinamo București (1951–2022); CS Dinamo (2014–2025)

The Dinamo Stadium was a multi-purpose stadium in Bucharest, Romania. It was used mostly for football matches and was the home ground of Dinamo București since its inception and until 2022, when the stadium didn't receive the license to host matches from Liga I and Liga II.

== History ==
The stadium was built in 1951. First match played here was Dinamo – Locomotiva Timișoara 1–0, on 14 October 1951.

In 2001, floodlights were added, and in 2006 a major renovation of the stadium began, enlarging the VIP section, and raising the capacity of the Tribune 2 stand. However, due to lack of funding the renovation has still not been completed. There are now plans to build a new arena, but administrative problems make progress very slow-going. New seats and a new scoreboard were added. Many important matches were held here including Dinamo against Everton and Bayer Leverkusen.

In April 2001, as the ground was broken during the work for the stadium's first renovation, a Second World War shell was discovered and extracted from a pit 20 meters away from the stands.

== Romania national football team ==
The following national team matches were held in the stadium:

| # | Date | Score | Opponent | Competition |
|---|---|---|---|---|
| 1. | 11 October 2003 | 1–1 | Japan | Friendly match |
| 2. | 19 November 2008 | 2–1 | Georgia | Friendly match |

== Gallery ==
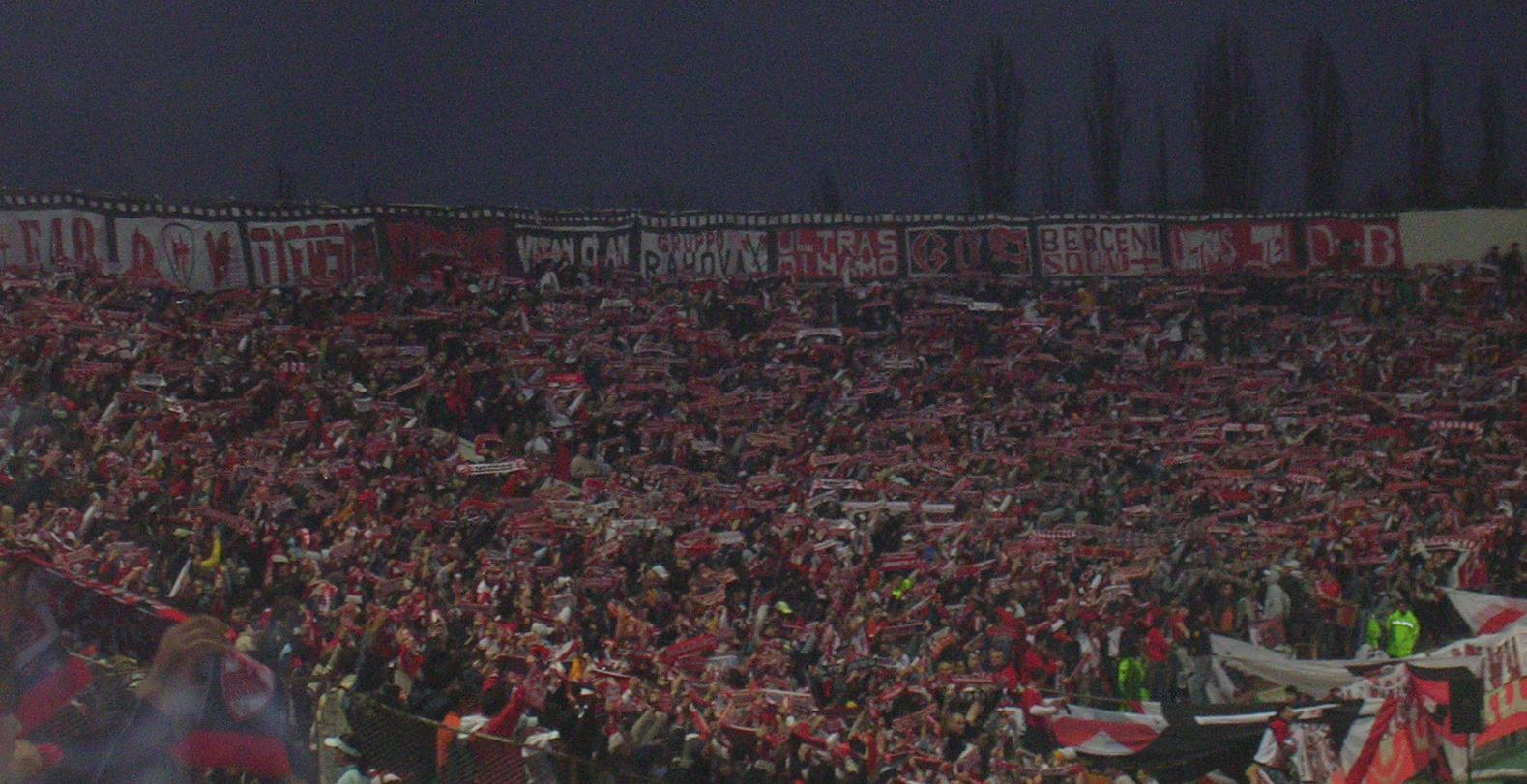
Peluza Catalin Hildan

Peluza Catalin Hildan

Peluza Catalin Hildan

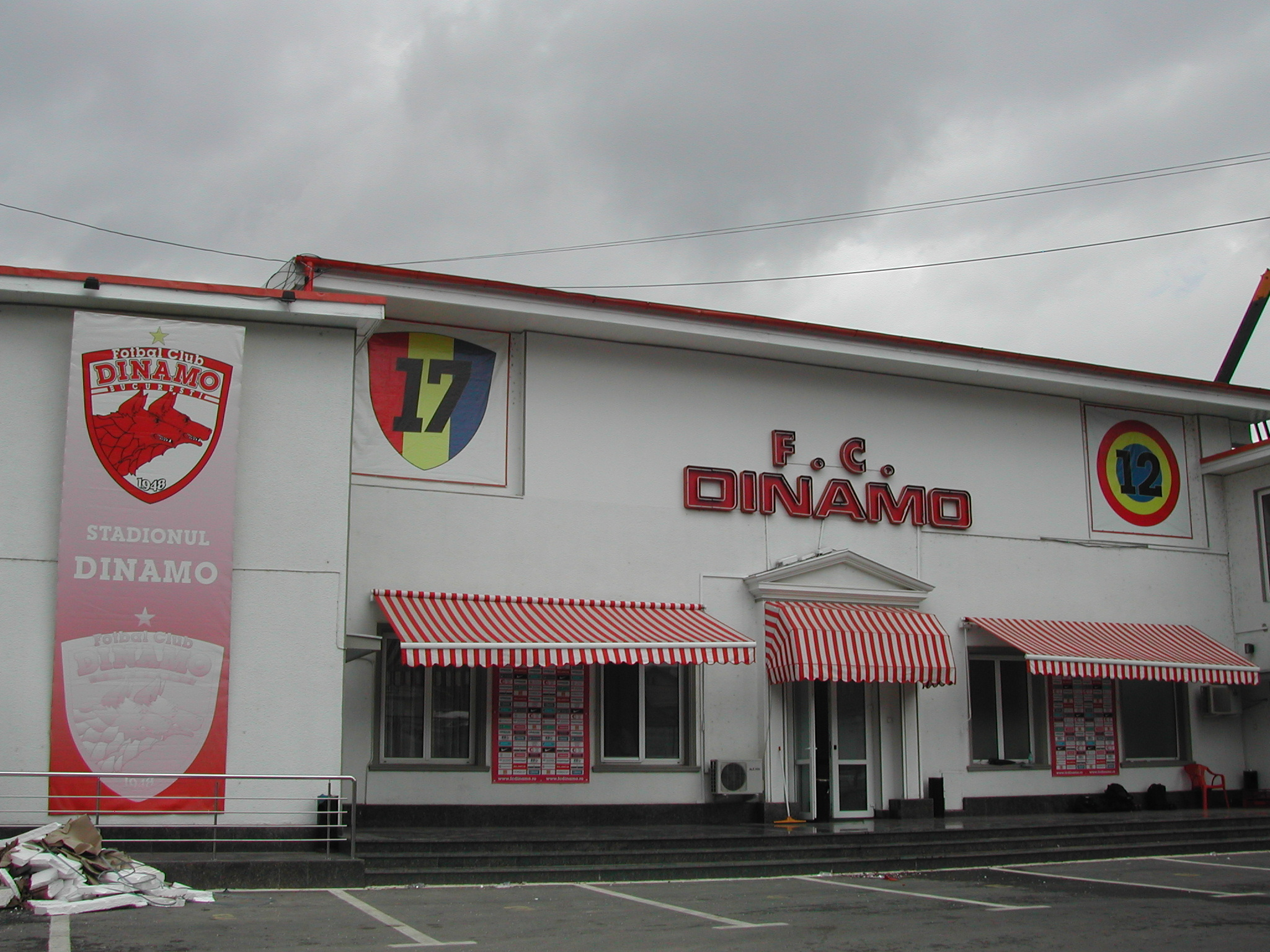
Main entrance

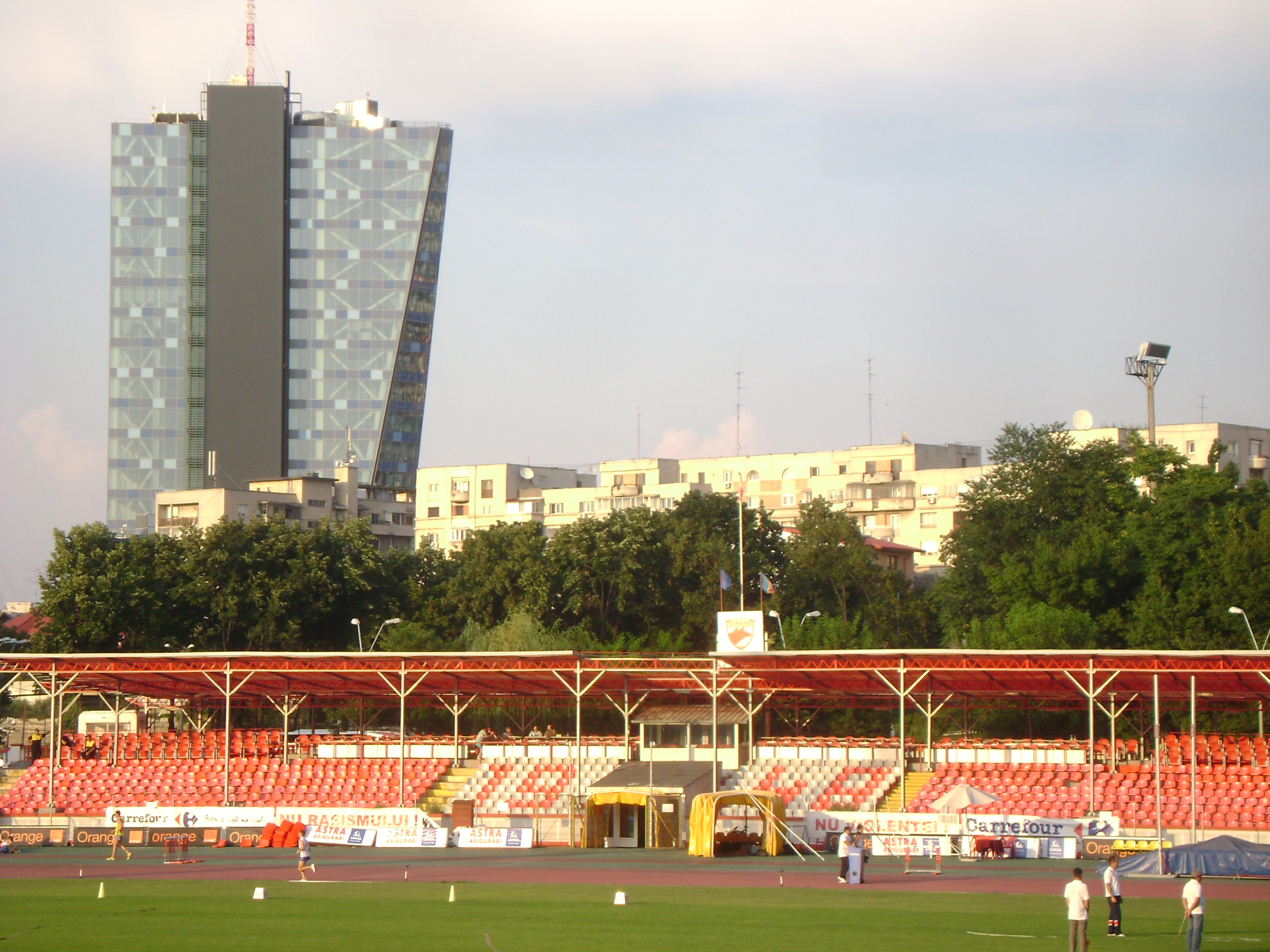
The stadium in 2010 during National Athletics Championships

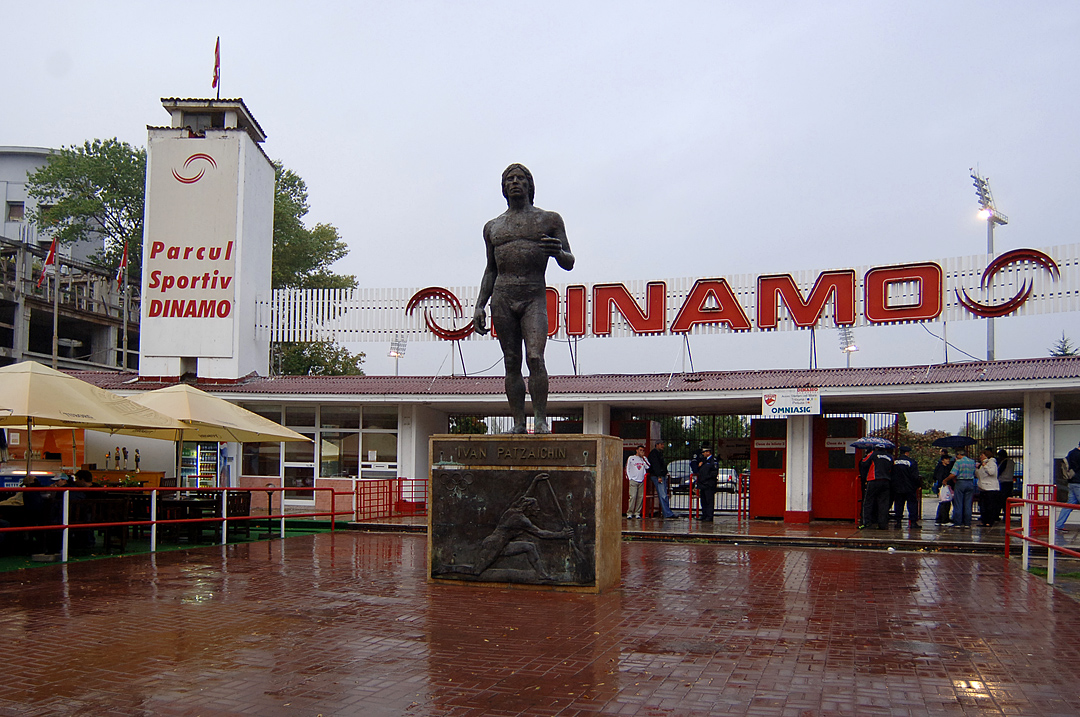
Statue of Ivan Patzaichin at the entrance

== See also ==
- List of football stadiums in Romania
