= Nicolás Gorobsov =

Argentine footballer

Personal information
- Full name: Nicolás Martín Gorobsov
- Date of birth: 25 November 1989 (age 36)
- Place of birth: San Pedro, Argentina
- Height: 1.77 m (5 ft 9 1/2 in)
- Position: Midfielder

Team information
- Current team: Polisportiva Gioiosa
- Number: 5

Youth career
- 2005–2008: Vicenza

Senior career*
| Years | Team | Apps | (Gls) |
| 2008–2009 | Vicenza | 16 | (0) |
| 2009–2014 | Torino | 15 | (0) |
| 2010–2011 | → Cesena (loan) | 1 | (0) |
| 2011–2012 | → Politehnica Timișoara (loan) | 12 | (0) |
| 2013 | → Nocerina (loan) | 10 | (0) |
| 2013–2014 | → ACS Poli Timișoara (loan) | 24 | (2) |
| 2014–2016 | ASA Târgu Mureș | 57 | (4) |
| 2016–2017 | Hapoel Tel Aviv | 5 | (0) |
| 2017 | ASA Târgu Mureș | 11 | (1) |
| 2018 | Paraná FC | | |
| 2018 | Miami United | 0 | (0) |
| 2018–2020 | Concordia Chiajna | 36 | (4) |
| 2019–2020 | → Voluntari (loan) | 31 | (0) |
| 2020–2021 | Sūduva | 37 | (6) |
| 2022–2023 | Žalgiris | 56 | (4) |
| 2024 | Panevėžys | 28 | (3) |
| 2025 | Avezzano | 9 | (0) |
| 2025– | Polisportiva Gioiosa | 19 | (7) |
- * Club domestic league appearances and goals as of 14 May 2026

Nicolás Martín Gorobsov (born 25 November 1989) is an Argentine professional footballer who plays as a midfielder for Eccellenza Sicilia club Polisportiva Gioiosa, which he captains.

== Early life ==
As a child, Gorobsov lived in San Pedro, north of Buenos Aires, before his family decided to move out of Argentina and settle in Italy. He is of Russian origin from the paternal line, making him eligible to represent Russia alongside Italy and Argentina.

== Club career ==
=== Early years / Vicenza ===
Gorobsov, who started as a trequartista in Argentina, switched to a position in the center of the field in Italy. During the 2007–08 season, he played 22 matches for Vicenza Calcio's Primavera team, scoring two goals, as well playing once for the seniors in Serie B. After being promoted to the first team before the 2008–09 season, he came to prominence, earning himself 15 caps and a reputation of hot prospect for the future.

=== Torino and loans ===
In June 2009, Torino F.C. acquired half of player's rights for €800,000 (€100,000 plus Saša Bjelanović). On 31 August 2010, he was loaned out to A.C. Cesena. On 5 September 2011, he was loaned out again, this time to Romanian Liga II club FC Politehnica Timișoara. In June 2012, Gorobsov was signed fully by Torino for free. Gorobsov was deemed surplus to requirements and never included into the first team squad for Serie A. In January 2013, he moved on loan to Lega Pro Prima Divisione club Nocerina. On 25 July 2013, he signed with ACS Poli Timișoara, the team considered to be the successor of the dissolved FC Politehnica Timișoara.

=== ASA Târgu Mureș ===
In July 2014, Gorobsov was released by Torino and joined ASA Târgu Mureș. His side ended the Liga I season second place, therefore playing the 2015 Romanian Supercup against FC Steaua București, a match they won 1–0. Eventually, he made 67 appearances and scored 6 goals all competitions comprised during his two years with "The Red-Blues".

=== Hapoel Tel Aviv ===
In June 2016, he signed a 3-year contract with Hapoel Tel Aviv F.C. from the Israeli Premier League.

=== Voluntari ===
On 29 June 2019, Gorobsov signed a one-year contract with Liga I side Voluntari.

=== Sūduva ===
In September 2020 he became a member of Lithuanian FK Sūduva.

=== Žalgiris ===
In January 2022 he signed with FK Žalgiris.

== Personal life ==
Gorobsov's passions, besides football, are cars and tattoos. He has written every name of his family members on the arm.

== Honours ==
Politehnica Timișoara

- Liga II: 2011–12

ASA Târgu Mureș

- Supercupa României: 2015

Sūduva

- Lithuanian Cup: 2020

Žalgiris

- A Lyga: 2022
- Lithuanian Cup: 2022
- Lithuanian Supercup: 2023
