= Anghel Iordănescu Stadium =

Romanian stadium

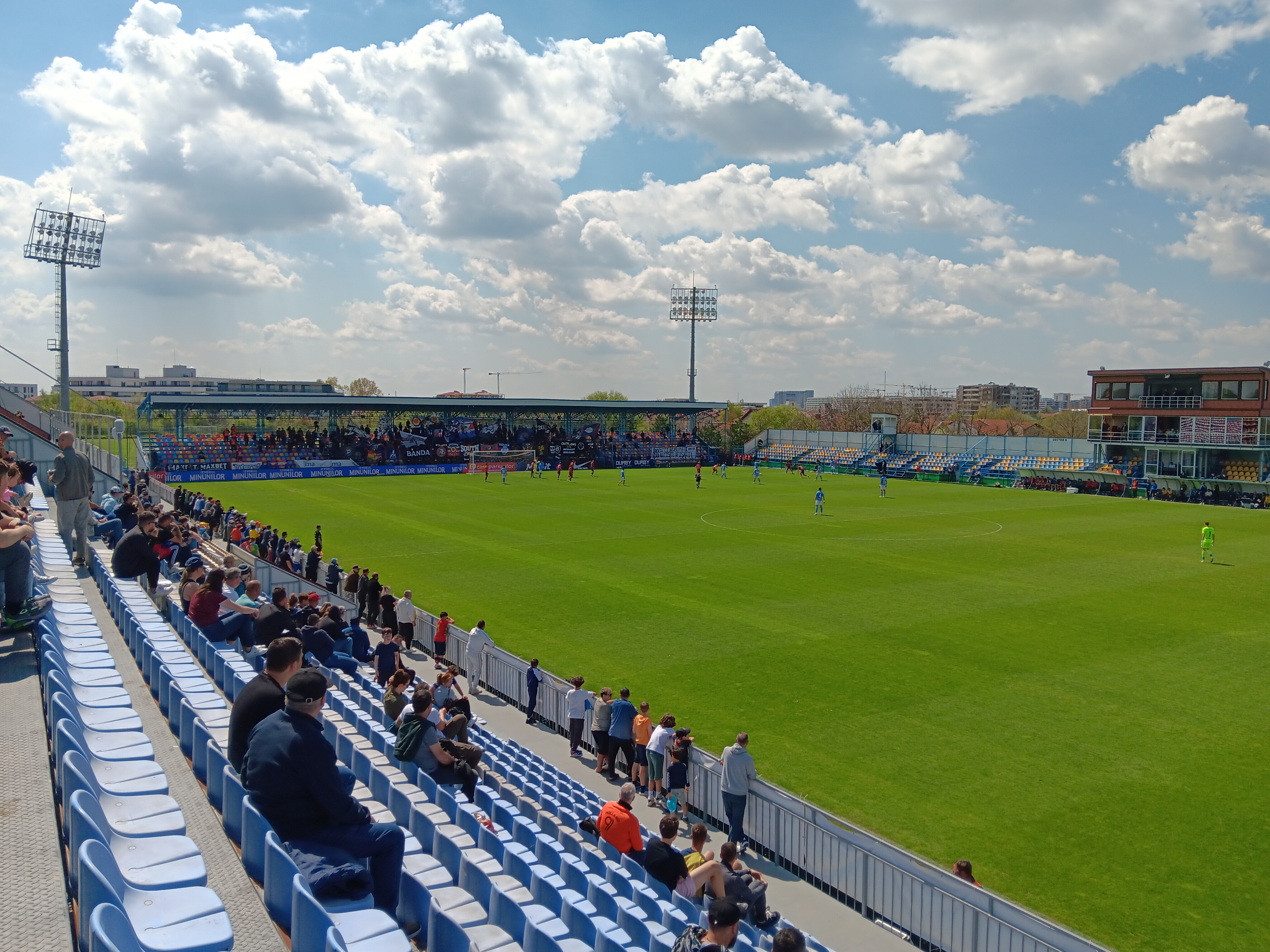
- Interactive map of Anghel Iordănescu Stadium
- Former names: Central Stadium; Niță Pintea Stadium
- Address: Str. Stadionului, nr. 1
- Location: Voluntari, Romania
- Coordinates: 44°29′57″N 26°8′44″E
- Owner: Town of Voluntari
- Operator: FC Voluntari
- Capacity: 4,518
- Surface: grass
- Field size: 105 x 65m

Construction
- Opened: 2012
- Expanded: 2015–2016

Tenant
- FC Voluntari (2012–present)

Stadionul Anghel Iordănescu is a football stadium in Voluntari, Ilfov County, Romania. It has been in use since 2012, has a seating capacity of 4,518, and is the home ground of FC Voluntari.

== History ==
The stadium officially opened in 2012 as the home ground of FC Voluntari. From its inauguration until 2015, the complex was known as Stadionul Niță Pintea, after the street on which it is located, the street itself being named in memory of a posthumously promoted sub-lieutenant who fell in action during World War I.

In the summer of 2015, following the local team's promotion to Liga I, local authorities renamed the venue Stadionul Anghel Iordănescu in honor of former Romania national football team manager Anghel Iordănescu. At the same time, the stadium underwent an extensive modernization and expansion process, including the installation of metal-framed stands to meet top-flight licensing requirements. The stadium was re-inaugurated in its current form in early 2016.

== Photo gallery ==
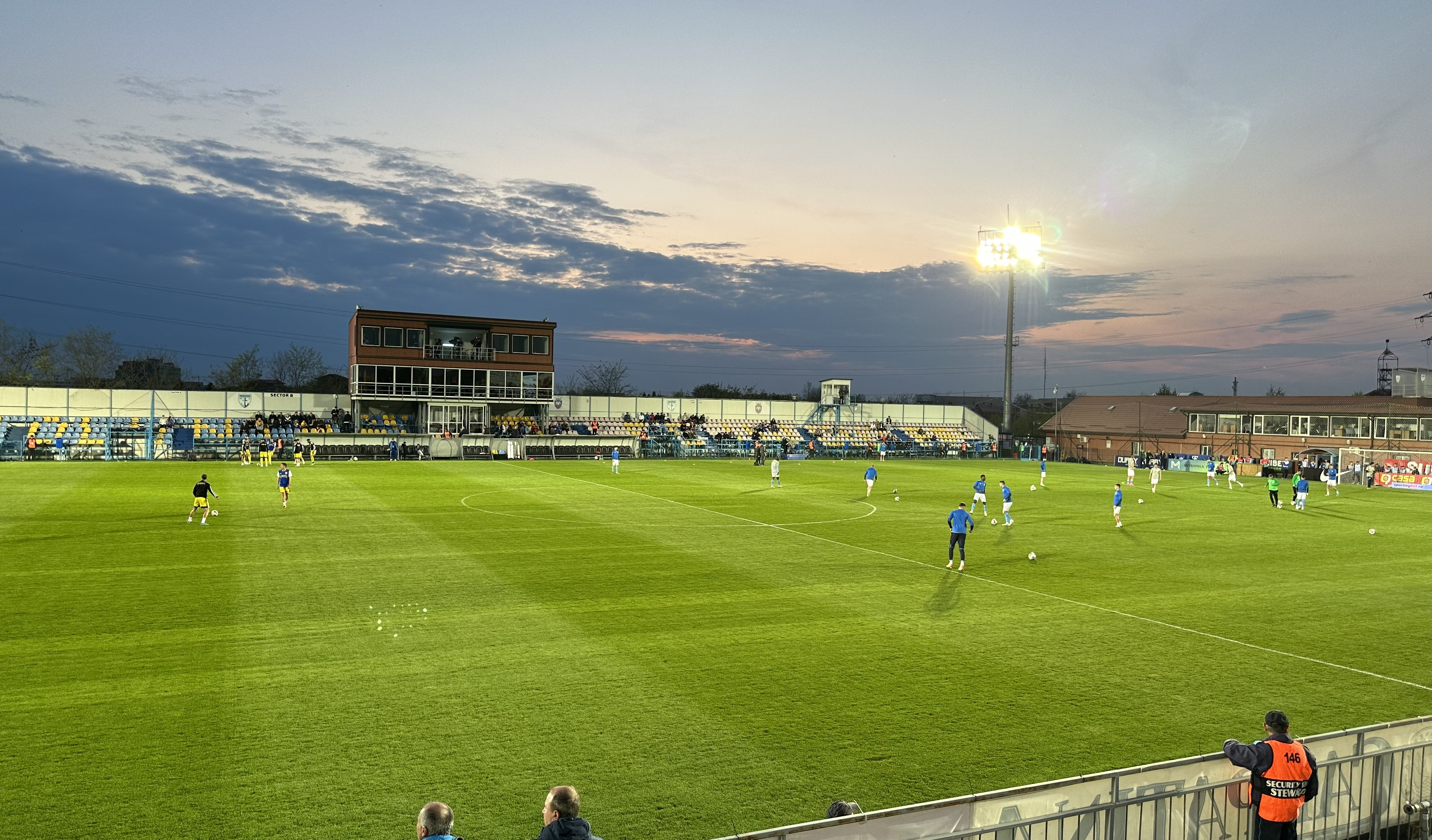
View towards second stand

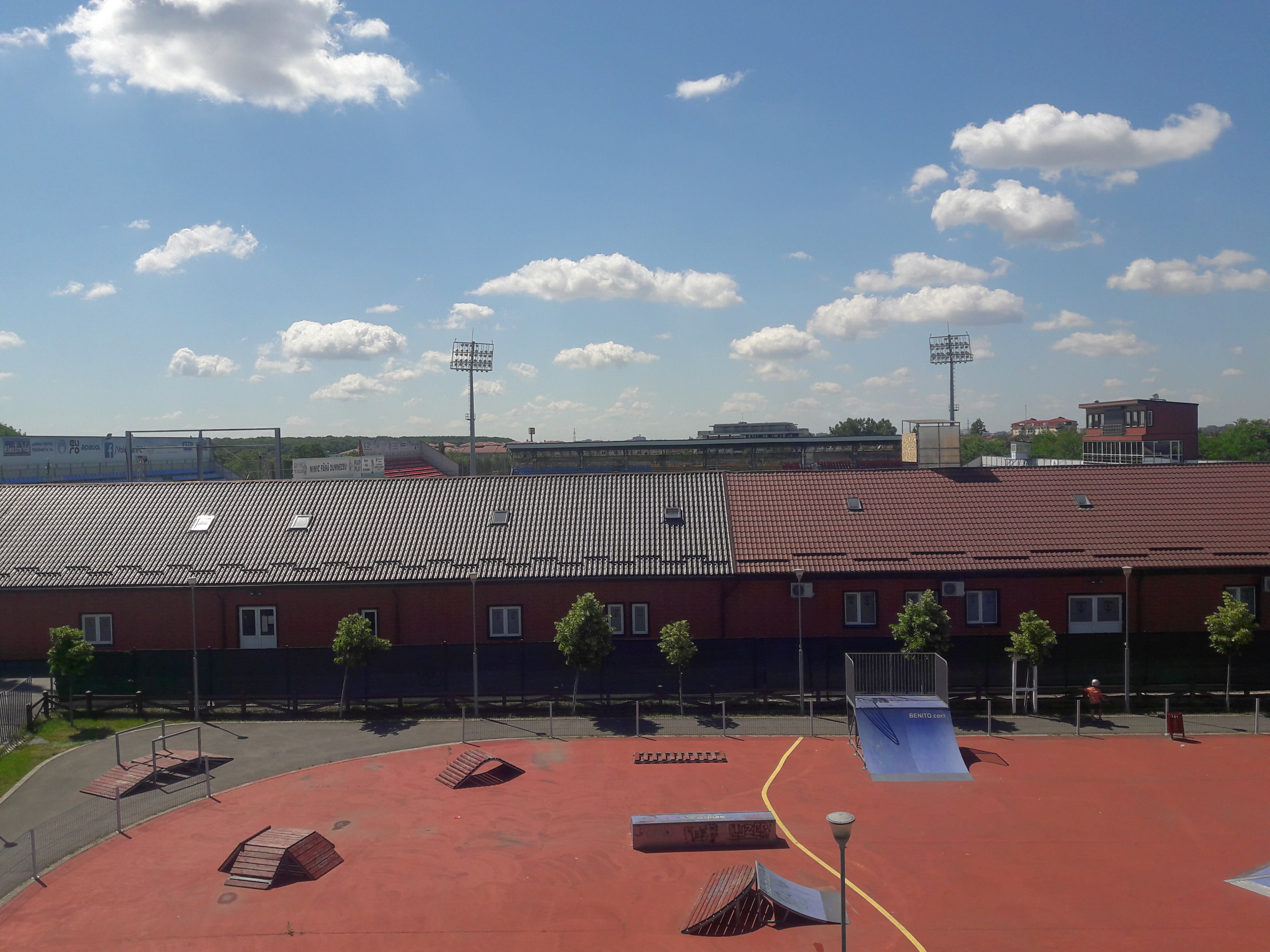
Outside view
