= Mattia Montini =

Italian footballer

Personal information
- Date of birth: 28 February 1992 (age 34)
- Place of birth: Frosinone, Italy
- Height: 1.84 m (6 ft 0 in)
- Position: Forward

Team information
- Current team: Valenzana Mado
- Number: 11

Youth career
- 2002–2011: Roma

Senior career*
Years	Team	Apps	(Gls)
2011–2012	Roma	0	(0)
2011–2012	→ Benevento (loan)	9	(1)
2012–2015	Benevento	11	(2)
2013	→ FeralpiSalò (loan)	13	(2)
2013–2014	→ Cittadella (loan)	4	(0)
2014	→ Juve Stabia (loan)	4	(0)
2014–2015	→ Arezzo (loan)	28	(2)
2015–2016	Pro Patria	20	(4)
2016–2017	Monopoli	19	(10)
2017–2018	Bari	0	(0)
2017	→ Monopoli (loan)	16	(3)
2017–2018	→ Livorno (loan)	24	(2)
2018–2020	Dinamo București	45	(17)
2020–2021	Astra Giurgiu	28	(5)
2021–2022	Widzew Łódź	10	(2)
2022–2023	Monopoli	17	(3)
2023	→ Cerignola (loan)	6	(0)
2023–2024	Fermana	13	(3)
2024	Trapani	6	(2)
2024–2025	Sarnese	23	(5)
2025–	Valenzana Mado	27	(11)

International career
2011	Italy U20	1	(0)
- * Club domestic league appearances and goals as of 27 April 2025

Mattia Montini (born 28 February 1992) is an Italian professional footballer who plays as a forward for Serie D club Valenzana Mado.

== Club career ==
=== Roma ===
Born in Frosinone, Lazio region, Montini started his professional career playing for the biggest club in his area Roma. After winning the reserve league with Roma in 2011, he left for Italian third division club Benevento along with Paolo Frascatore, in temporary deals.

=== Benevento ===
Montini played 9 times in 2011–12 Lega Pro Prima Divisione season and on 22 June 2012 the club excised the option to purchase half of the registration rights for €200,000, as part of the counter-option on Frascatore (€250,000). On 23 January 2013 he was signed by FeralpiSalò in temporary deal. He also extended his contract to last until 30 June 2016 on the same day. On 21 June 2013 Montini joined Benevento outright for another €63,000. The club outbid Roma in the tender process after no agreement was made.

On 5 July 2013 Montini went to loan to Cittadella of Italian Serie B with option to sign half of the registration rights. He played 4 times in the second division. On 28 January 2014 he swapped club with William Jidayi of Juve Stabia.

On 31 August 2017, he joined Livorno on loan.

=== Dinamo București ===
On 14 November 2018, Montini signed for Romanian team Dinamo București. On 15 December 2018, he scored a hattrick against Universitatea Craiova. On 4 February 2019, he scored two goals against Politehnica Iasi, bringing his tally to 6 goals in as many appearances. He was released by Dinamo in August 2020.

=== Monopoli ===
On 18 August 2022, Montini returned to Monopoli on a two-year contract. On 31 January 2023, he was loaned to Cerignola.

== International career ==
Montini received his only Italy U20 call-up in February 2011, to replace Gianmarco Zigoni who withdrew. In the second half of the game against Germany, Montini substituted Matteo Chinellato, who himself was also a substitute in that match.

== Honours ==
Livorno

- Serie C: 2017–18 (group A)

Trapani

- Serie C: 2023–24 (group I)
- Coppa Italia Serie D: 2023–24
