= Chiajna =

- Commune
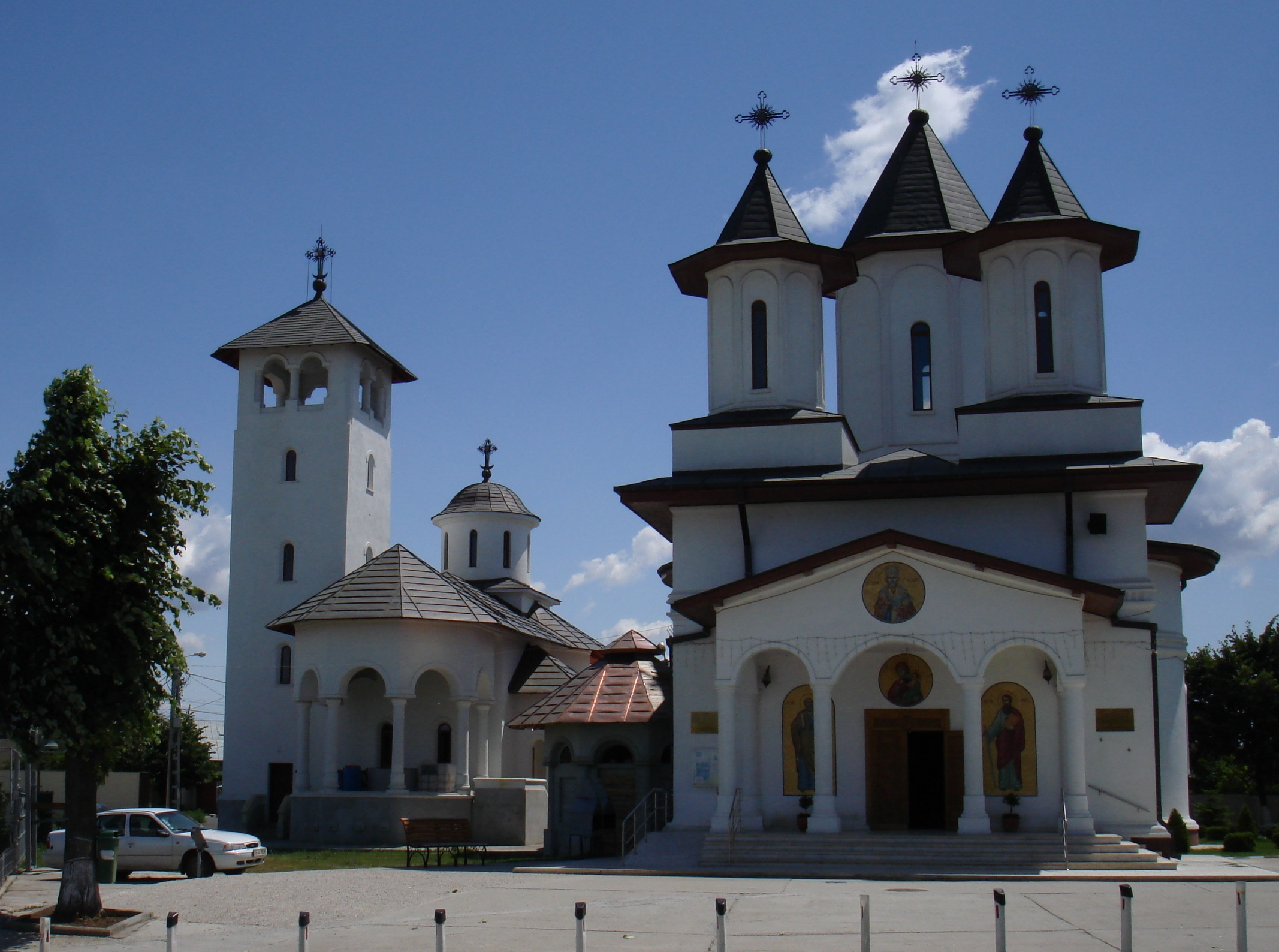
- Church in Chiajna

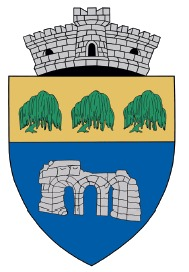
- Coat of arms

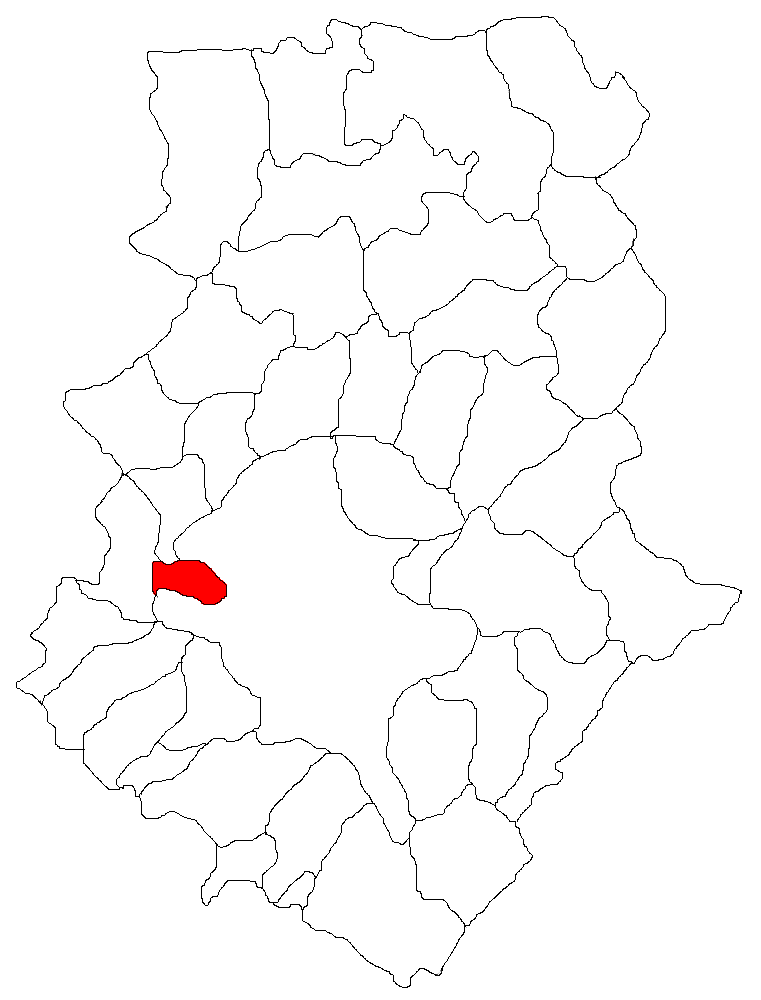
- Location in Ilfov County

- Location in Romania
- Coordinates: 44.460°N 25.975°E
- Country: Romania
- County: Ilfov

Government
  - Mayor (2024–2028): Mircea Minea (PSD)
- Area: 16.10 km^{2} (6.22 sq mi)
- Elevation: 94 m (308 ft)
- Population (2021-12-01): 43,584
  - Density: 2,707/km^{2} (7,011/sq mi)
- Time zone: UTC+02:00 (EET)
  - Summer (DST): UTC+03:00 (EEST)
- Postal code: 077040
- Area code: (+40) 02 1
- Vehicle reg.: IF
- Website: www.primariachiajna.ro

Chiajna (Romanian pronunciation: [ˈkjaʒna]) is a commune in the south-west of Ilfov County, Muntenia, Romania, immediately west of the capital, Bucharest. It is composed of three villages: Chiajna, Dudu, and Roșu.

The mayor of Chiajna is currently Mircea Minea (Social Democratic Party).

== Etymology ==
Chiajna is a Romanian female name, being a feminine version of "cneaz" (Knyaz).

In one version Chiajna was named after the wife of Cernica Știrbey, a Wallachian vornic who owned the area where people from Cernavodă settled and founded the village.

Another story says that Lady Chiajna (c. 1525–1588, Istanbul) was the daughter of Petru Rareș, the voievod of Moldavia, an illegitimate child of Ștefan cel Mare. Lady Chiajna was the wife of Wallachian prince Mircea V Ciobanul. In Romanian literature (e.g., the novella Doamna Chiajna, published in 1860 by author Alexandru Odobescu), she is a famous and frightening female character, similar to Lady Macbeth.

== Demographics ==
Historical population
Year	Pop.	±%
2002	8,009	—
2011	14,259	+78.0%
2021	43,584	+205.7%
Source: Census data

Chiajna is one of the fastest growing localities in Romania. Its population increased from 14,259 people at the 2011 census to 43,584 people according to the 2021 census.

== Natives ==
- Alexandru Cîmpanu (born 2000), footballer
- Marian Cristescu (born 1985), footballer

== Features of the commune ==
The commune is home to the Lady Chiajna Technological High School, which has a Tourism and Public Alimentation specialization and a Sports specialization.

The commune is host to the football team Concordia Chiajna. The team is in Liga II, and plays its home matches on Stadionul Concordia. The Concordia Chiajna basketball team was founded in 1957 and dissolved in 2013.

Since the 2010s, Chiajna has been the site of new residential developments collectively known as "Militari Residence", which have become notorious for their poor urban planning and construction practices.

== See also ==
- Chiajna Monastery, in nearby Giulești
