= Concordia Stadium (Chiajna) =

Football stadium in Chiajna, Romania

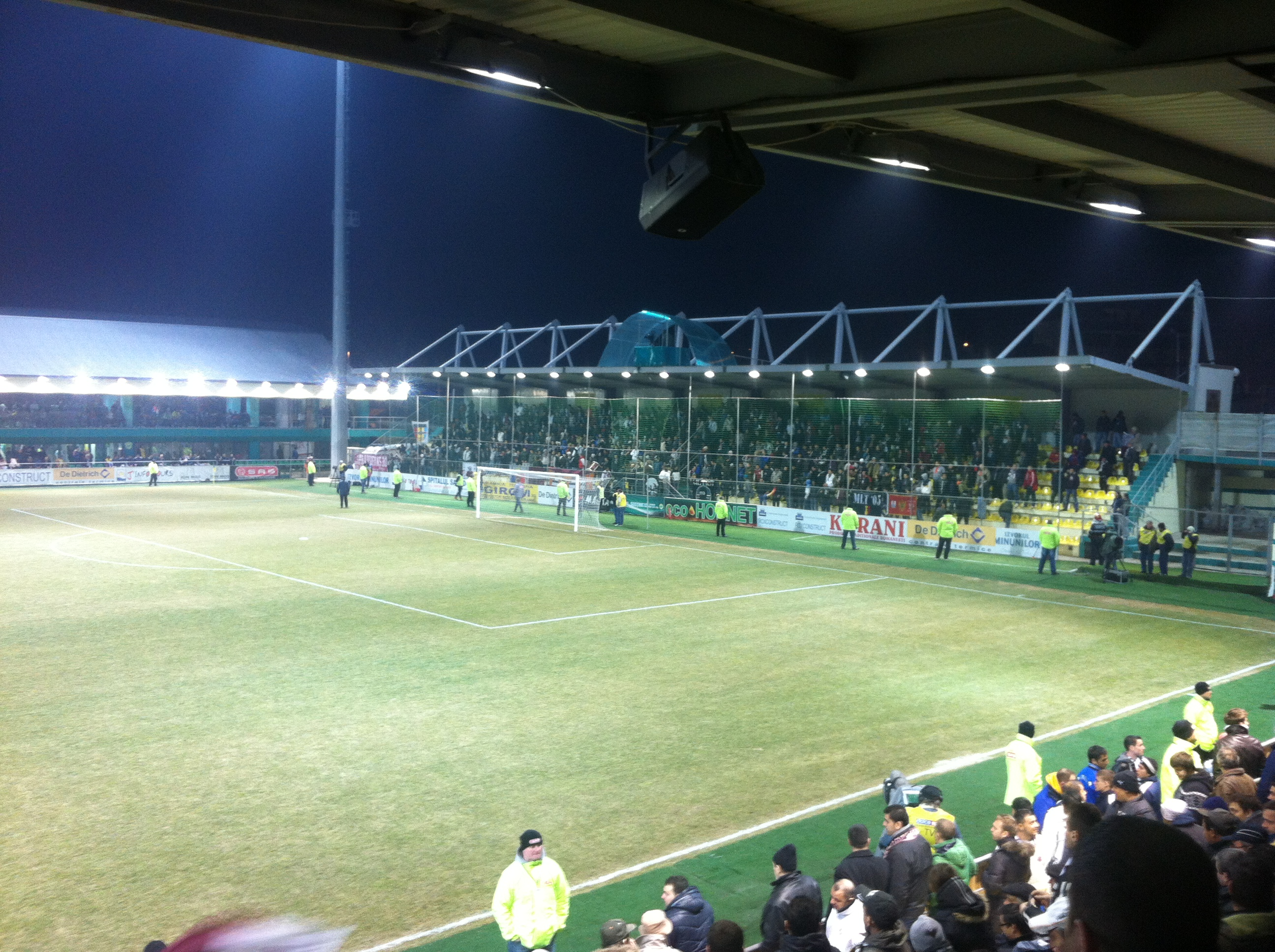
- The venue in 2008
- Interactive map of Concordia Stadium
- Address: Str. Drumul Gării, nr. 1-3
- Location: Chiajna, Romania
- Coordinates: 44°27′46″N 25°58′32″E
- Owner: Commune of Chiajna
- Operator: Concordia Chiajna
- Capacity: 5,123
- Surface: Artificial turf
- Field size: 105 x 60m

Construction
- Opened: 2007

Tenant
- Concordia Chiajna (2007–present)

Concordia Stadium is a football stadium in Chiajna, Romania. The stadium holds 5,123 people. It is the home ground of Concordia Chiajna. It hosted three group games, one semifinal and the final of the 2011 UEFA European Under-19 Football Championship.

== Gallery ==
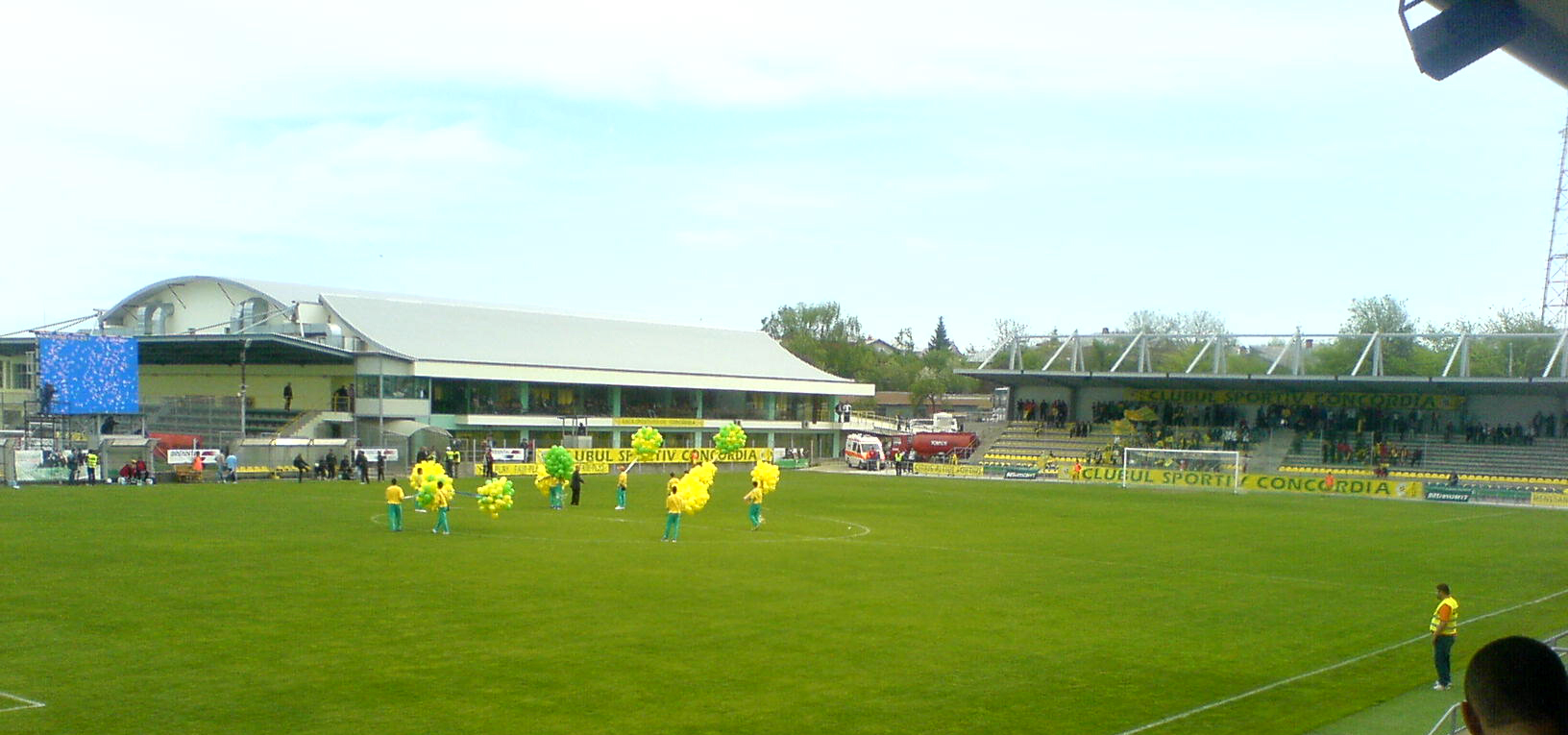
Interior view of the stadium

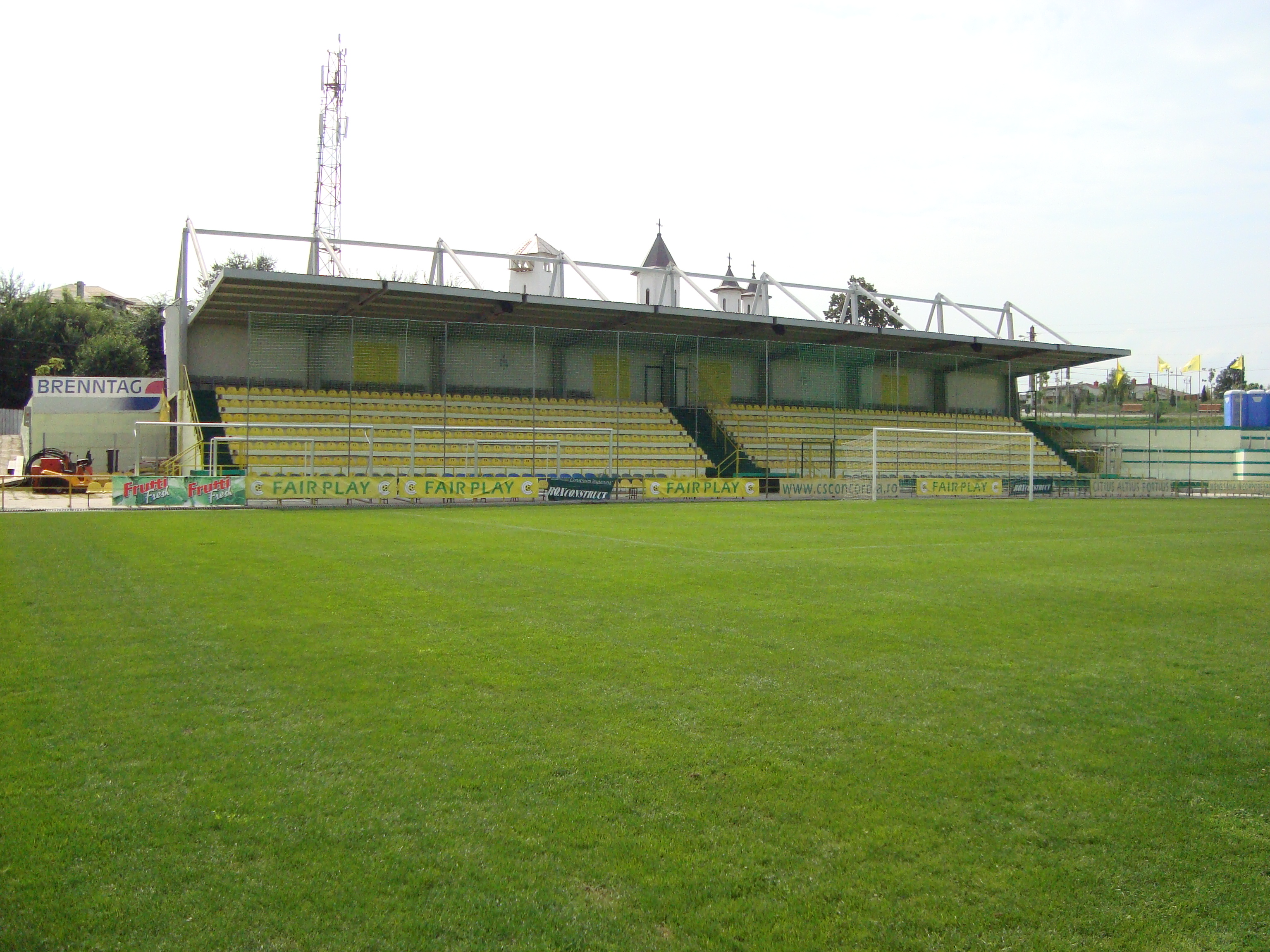
South End

Preceded by Stade Michel d'Ornano; Caen	UEFA European Under-19 Football Championship; Final Venue; 2011	Succeeded by A. Le Coq Arena; Tallinn
