= Mihai Leca =

Romanian footballer

Personal information
- Full name: Mihai Daniel Leca
- Date of birth: 14 April 1992 (age 34)
- Place of birth: Bucharest, Romania
- Height: 1.92 m (6 ft 3 1/2 in)
- Position: Centre back

Youth career
- Steaua București
- –2011: Concordia Chiajna

Senior career*
| Years | Team | Apps | (Gls) |
| 2011–2014 | Concordia Chiajna | 60 | (1) |
| 2014–2015 | Oțelul Galați | 11 | (0) |
| 2015–2016 | Zakho | 20 | (1) |
| 2016 | FC Brașov | 11 | (0) |
| 2017 | The New Saints | 5 | (0) |
| 2017 | Zimbru Chișinău | 3 | (0) |
| 2018 | Juventus București | 16 | (1) |
| 2018–2019 | Concordia Chiajna | 15 | (1) |
| 2019 | → Chindia Târgoviște (loan) | 13 | (4) |
| 2019–2020 | Chindia Târgoviște | 19 | (1) |
| 2020–2021 | Argeș Pitești | 23 | (0) |
| 2021–2022 | Lviv | 8 | (0) |
| 2023–2024 | Tunari | 19 | (2) |
| 2024–2025 | Chindia Târgoviște | 19 | (0) |
| 2026 | CS Dinamo București | 7 | (1) |

International career
| 2012–2013 | Romania U21 | 4 | (0) |
- * Club domestic league appearances and goals as of 2 May 2026

Mihai Daniel Leca (born 14 April 1992) is a Romanian professional footballer who plays as a centre back.

== Honours ==
The New Saints

- Welsh Premier League: 2016–17
- Welsh Cup runner-up: 2016–17
- Welsh League Cup: 2016–17

Chindia Târgoviște

- Liga II: 2018–19
