= CS Concordia Chiajna =

Romanian football club

Concordia Chiajna
- Full name: Clubul Sportiv Concordia Chiajna
- Nicknames: Vulturii verzi (The Green Eagles); Ilfovenii (The People from Ilfov County)
- Short name: Chiajna
- Founded: 1957; 69 years ago
- Ground: Concordia
- Capacity: 5,123
- Owner: Chiajna Commune
- Chairman: Cristian Tănase
- Head coach: Adrian Scarlatache
- League: Liga II
- 2025–26: Liga II, 11th of 20
- Website: www.csconcordia.ro
Home colours	Away colours	Third colours

Clubul Sportiv Concordia Chiajna, commonly known as Concordia Chiajna, is a Romanian professional football club based in Chiajna, Ilfov County, which competes in the Liga II.

Founded in 1957, the team's best period was between 2011 and 2019, when it amassed eight participations in the highest tier of the Romanian league system, the Liga I. Concordia was also runner-up of the short-lived Cupa Ligii in the 2015–16 campaign.

The club plays its home matches on the namesake Stadionul Concordia, which has artificial turf and can hold 5,123 persons.

== History ==
Chart showing the progress of Concordia's finishes in the national leagues from 2005 to 2017.

The club was founded in 1957 by the inhabitants of the Chiajna commune in Ilfov County. Over the years, the team was also known as GAC Chiajna, AS Chiajna and ILF Militari, the latter name being used during a period when the club was sponsored by Întreprinderea de Legume-Fructe Militari. Concordia spent most of its early history in the lower divisions of the Romanian football league system, before earning promotion to Liga II for the first time in 2007. Four years later, the club finished second in the 2010–11 Liga II and achieved its first promotion to Liga I.

Concordia finished ninth in its debut Liga I season. In the following campaign, the club ended the championship in 15th place, but ultimately remained in the top flight after a ruling by the Court of Arbitration for Sport resulted in Concordia retaining its Liga I place and Rapid București being relegated. Concordia remained in Liga I for eight consecutive seasons, from 2011 to 2019, before being relegated to the second division at the end of the 2018–19 season.

The club has competed in Liga II since 2019. Its closest attempt to return to the top flight came in the 2021–22 season, when it finished fifth in the promotion play-off and qualified for the promotion/relegation play-off against Chindia Târgoviște, eventually losing the tie on penalties. Concordia subsequently remained in the second tier and continues to compete in Liga II in the 2026–27 season.

== Honours ==
=== League ===
- Liga II
  - Runners-up: 2010–11
- Liga III
  - Winners: 2006–07

=== Cups ===
- Cupa Ligii
  - Runners-up: 2015–16

== Players ==
=== First team squad ===
As of 4 November 2026

Note: Flags indicate national team as defined under FIFA eligibility rules; some limited exceptions apply. Players may hold more than one non-FIFA nationality.

No.	Pos.	Nation	Player
1	GK	ROU	Adrian Briciu
3	DF	ROU	Denis Dumitrașcu (3rd captain)
4	DF	ROU	Mihai Bălașa (Captain)
5	DF	ESP	Luis Pareja
6	DF	ROU	Ionuț Pop
7	FW	ROU	Alexandru Jipa
8	MF	ESP	Sergio Carrasco
9	FW	ROU	Andreas Chirițoiu
10	MF	ROU	Robert Ion
11	MF	ESP	Alexis Chamorro
12	GK	ROU	Filip Munteanu
14	DF	ROU	Ianis Pădureanu
15	MF	ROU	Aurelian Ciuciulete
16	MF	ESP	Álex Gualda

No.	Pos.	Nation	Player
17	MF	ROU	Ștefan Pănoiu
18	MF	ROU	Sebastian Banu (on loan from Rapid București)
20	MF	ROU	Iosua Huluba
21	DF	ROU	Mihai Dobrescu (Vice-captain)
22	FW	ROU	Nicolae Carnat
23	MF	ESP	Ian Soler
24	DF	ROU	Darius Fălcușan (on loan from Universitatea Craiova)
25	FW	ALB	Din Sula
26	GK	ROU	Yanis Stanciu
28	FW	ROU	George Ganea
29	MF	ROU	Cristian Licsandru (on loan from Dinamo București)
30	FW	ROU	Raul Rotund
33	MF	ROU	Darius Ghindovean (on loan from Voluntari)
77	MF	ESP	Santi Samanes

=== Dual registration ===
Note: Flags indicate national team as defined under FIFA eligibility rules; some limited exceptions apply. Players may hold more than one non-FIFA nationality.

No.	Pos.	Nation	Player
27	MF	ROU	Mihai Toma (from FCSB)
—	GK	ROU	Rareș Andrei (from FCSB)
—	DF	ROU	Andrei Dăncuș (from FCSB)

No.	Pos.	Nation	Player
—	FW	ROU	Alexandru Stoian (from FCSB)
—	FW	ROU	David Popa (from FCSB)

=== Out on loan ===
Note: Flags indicate national team as defined under FIFA eligibility rules; some limited exceptions apply. Players may hold more than one non-FIFA nationality.

No.	Pos.	Nation	Player
—	GK	ROU	Alexandru Berci (at CSM Alexandria until 30 June 2027)
—	DF	ROU	Marian Dragomir (at CSM Alexandria until 30 June 2027)
—	DF	ROU	Adrian Iancu (at ASA Târgu Mureș until 30 June 2027)
—	MF	ROU	Ionuț Voicu (at Progresul Fundulea until 30 June 2027)

No.	Pos.	Nation	Player
—	MF	ROU	Ionuț Catrina (at Academica Balș until 30 June 2027)
—	MF	ROU	Marius Rusu (at Tunari until 30 June 2027)
—	FW	ROU	Robert Belibrov (at Progresul Spartac until 30 June 2027)

== Club officials ==
=== Board of directors ===
Role	Name
Owner	(Romania) Chiajna Commune
President	(Romania) Cristian Tănase
Board Member	(Romania) Mircea Minea
Economic Director	(Romania) Monica Deculescu
Marketing Director	(Romania) Radu Birlică
Technical Director	(Romania) Liță Dumitru
Youth Center Director	(Romania) Costel Orac
Sporting Director	(Romania) Mugurel Porumbacu
Secretary	(Romania) Dumitru Mihalache
Responsible for Order and Safety	(Romania) Cristian Ficleanu
Team Manager	(Romania) Alexandru Borisov
Press Officer	(Romania) Florin Petrescu

=== Current technical staff ===
Role	Name
Head coach	(Romania) Adrian Scarlatache
Assistant coach	(Romania) Bobi Verdeș
Goalkeeping coach	(Romania) Florin Matache
Fitness coach	(Romania) Vasile Gheorghe
Kinetotherapist	(Romania) Cristian Tudoroiu
Club Doctor	(Romania) Mamour Kane
Masseurs	(Romania) Dumitru Tiberari (Romania) Iulian Creangă
Storemen	(Romania) Victor Cristea (Romania) Ilie Tache

== League history ==
Season	Tier	Division	Place	Cupa României
2026–27	2	Liga II	TBD	TBD
2025–26	2	Liga II	13th	Group Stage
2024–25	2	Liga II	15th	Play-off round
2023–24	2	Liga II	12th	Play-off round
2022–23	2	Liga II	8th	Play-off round
2021–22	2	Liga II	5th	Round of 32
2020–21	2	Liga II	13th	Round of 32
2019–20	2	Liga II	16th	Round of 32
2018–19	1	Liga I	14th (R)	Round of 32
2017–18	1	Liga I	11th	Round of 32
2016–17	1	Liga I	11th	Round of 32
2015–16	1	Liga I	11th	Round of 16
2014–15	1	Liga I	12th	Round of 32
2013–14	1	Liga I	14th	Round of 32
2012–13	1	Liga I	15th	Quarter-finals
2011–12	1	Liga I	9th	Round of 32
2010–11	2	Liga II (Seria I)	2nd (P)	Round of 32
2009–10	2	Liga II (Seria I)	7th	Fourth Round
2008–09	2	Liga II (Seria I)	8th	Fourth Round
2007–08	2	Liga II (Seria I)	5th	Round of 32
2006–07	3	Liga III (Seria III)	1st (C, P)	

== Notable former players ==
The footballers enlisted below have had international cap(s) for their respective countries at junior and/or senior level and/or more than 75 caps for CS Concordia Chiajna.

Romania

- (Romania) Alexandru Albu
- (Romania) Paul Batin
- (Romania) Adrian Bălan
- (Romania) Cristian Bălgrădean
- (Romania) Ștefan Bărboianu
- (Romania) Claudiu Belu
- (Romania) Bogdan Bucurică
- (Romania) Claudiu Bumba
- (Romania) Dorin Codrea
- (Romania) Valentin Crețu
- (Romania) Marian Cristescu
- (Romania) Florin Gardoș
- (Romania) Sorin Ghionea
- (Romania) Gabriel Giurgiu
- (Romania) Răzvan Grădinaru
- (Romania) Ovidiu Herea
- (Romania) Gabriel Iancu
- (Romania) Adrian Iencsi
- (Romania) Rareș Lazăr
- (Romania) Mihai Leca
- (Romania) Vasile Maftei
- (Romania) Iulian Mamele
- (Romania) Andrei Marc
- (Romania) Petre Marin
- (Romania) Cristian Melinte
- (Romania) Adrian Mihalcea
- (Romania) Mihai Neicuțescu
- (Romania) Florin Niță
- (Romania) Silviu Pană
- (Romania) Sorin Paraschiv
- (Romania) Paul Pîrvulescu
- (Romania) Marius Pena
- (Romania) Adrian Popa
- (Romania) Andrei Prepeliță
- (Romania) Florin Purece
- (Romania) Neluț Roșu
- (Romania) Adrian Scarlatache
- (Romania) Tiberiu Serediuc
- (Romania) Gabriel Tamaș
- (Romania) Gabriel Torje
- (Romania) Eugen Trică
- (Romania) Bogdan Vintilă

Albania

- (Albania) Azdren Llullaku

Algeria

- (Algeria) Billel Omrani

Argentina

- (Argentina) Nicolás Gorobsov

Brazil

- (Brazil) Fernando Boldrin
- (Brazil) Wellington

Bulgaria

- (Bulgaria) Yordan Gospodinov

Burkina Faso

- (Burkina Faso) Narcisse Bambara

Italy

- (Italy) Alessandro Caparco

Jordan

- (Jordan) Tha'er Bawab

Moldova

- (Moldova) Alexandru Boiciuc
- (Moldova) Cătălin Carp

Nigeria

- (Nigeria) Christian Obodo
- (Nigeria) Michael Odibe
- (Nigeria) Gomo Onduku

North Macedonia

- (North Macedonia) Petar Petkovski

Tunisia

- (Tunisia) Hamza Younés

Ukraine

- (Ukraine) Danylo Kucher
- (Ukraine) Artem Milevskyi

== Notable former managers ==
- (Romania) Adrian Bumbescu
- (Romania) Laurențiu Diniță
- (Romania) Liță Dumitru
- (Romania) Ion Moldovan
- (Romania) Costel Orac
- (Romania) Laurențiu Reghecampf
- (Romania) Emil Săndoi
- (Romania) Ilie Stan
- (Romania) Marius Șumudică
- (Romania) Cornel Țălnar
