= 2010–11 FC Oțelul Galați season =

FC Oțelul Galați
2010–11 season
- Chairman: Marius Stan
- Manager: Dorinel Munteanu
- Liga I: 1st (champions)
- Cupa României: Round of 32
- Top goalscorer: League: Pena (8); All: Pena (8)

The 2010–11 season was Oțelul Galați's 19th consecutive season in the Liga I, and its 22nd overall season in the top-flight of Romanian football. It was the first season with new shirt supplier Masita.

Oțelul's primary objective will be to obtain a qualifying spot for the 2011–2012 season of Europa League.

== Overview ==
The previous season of Liga I ended on May 22 and the players went on vacation. On June 10 the team returned from holiday, with two new faces: Laurenţiu Buş, which returned from a 6-month loan from Arieşul Turda, team from which he was initially bought in January 2010 but loaned back to finish the season there, and Georgian Butoi – a youth player signed up from Farul Constanţa.

The team trained in Galați for a few days and on June 13 they left for a training camp in Poiana Braşov. During the time spent there Csaba Borbély was signed while N'Kongue, Goločevac, Siminic and Nikolić left the team. Due to the ongoing economical crisis Oțelul tried to talk some players into cutting down their wages, with players like Paraschiv, Viglianti and Perendija accepting. The mountain training-camp ended on June 26.

The team reunited again in Galați on June 28 where they started training again. The following day, club president Marius Stan announced that ticket prices went up because the club needs money to continue or start new investments – especially the floodlights system, feature without which the team will not be able to play Liga I matches on home ground.

The team was set for another training camp, this time in Germany, between 2 and 15 July.

== Players ==
=== Transfers ===
==== In ====
No.	Pos.	Nat.	Name	Age	EU	Moving from	Type	Transfer window	Ends	Transfer fee	Source
9	MF	(Romania)	Buş	22	EU	Arieşul Turda	Loan return	Summer	TBA	–	
32	FW	(Romania)	Borbély	29	EU		Transfer	Summer	2011	Free	
17	LB	(Romania)	Cucu	20	EU	CSM Râmnicu Sărat	Loan return	Summer	TBA	–	
19	FW	(Romania)	Elek	22	EU	Bihor Oradea	Loan return	Summer	TBA	–	
5	DF	(Romania)	Petean	22	EU	Delta Tulcea	Loan return	Summer	TBA	–	
33	GK	(Romania)	Brăneţ	33	EU	Politehnica Iași	Transfer	Summer	2011	Free	
–	FW	(Serbia)	Punoševac	23	Non-EU	Napredak Kruševac (Serbia)	Transfer	Winter	2011	€ 80,000	
–	MF	(Romania)	Milea	25	EU	Politehnica Iași	Transfer	Winter	Undisclosed	Free	
–	CB	(Romania)	Mişelăricu	20	EU	Delta Tulcea	Transfer	Winter	2016	Undisclosed	
–	GK	(Serbia)	Campar	24	Non-EU	Radnički Sombor (Serbia)	Transfer	Winter	Undisclosed	Undisclosed	
–	FW	(Serbia)	Pjevic	19	Non-EU	Partizan (Serbia)	Transfer	Winter	Undisclosed	Undisclosed	
–	CM	(Romania)	Floruţ	19	EU	FC Bihor	Transfer	Winter	Undisclosed	Free	

==== Out ====
No.	Pos.	Nat.	Name	Age	EU	Moving to	Type	Transfer window	Transfer fee	Source
9	FW	(Romania)	Axente	23	EU	Politehnica Timișoara	Loan end	Summer	–	
19	FW	(Bosnia and Herzegovina)	Nikolić	25	Non-EU		Released	Summer	–	
4	LB	(Romania)	Siminic	24	EU		Released	Summer	–	
5	MF	(Serbia)	Goločevac	26	Non-EU		Released	Summer	–	
–	FW	(Cameroon)	Jean N'Kongue	27	Non-EU		Released	Summer	–	
2	FB	(Romania)	Cârjă	23	EU	Petrolul Ploiești	Loan out	Summer	Undisclosed	
	FW	(Romania)	Matei	26	EU		Released	Summer	–	
21	MF	(Romania)	Gârleanu	21	EU	Petrolul Ploiești	Loan out	Winter	–	
19	FW	(Romania)	Elek	22	EU	ACSMU Politehnica Iaşi	Loan out	Winter	–	
24	FW	(Romania)	Avram	19	EU	Delta Tulcea	Loan out	Winter	–	
17	MF	(Romania)	Cucu	21	EU	Delta Tulcea	Loan out	Winter	–	
1	GK	(Colombia)	William Arias	20	Non-EU	Callatis	Loan out	Winter	–	

EU = if holds or not a European Union passport; Country: when 2 flags, 1st flag = country that plays for internationally, 2nd flag = country of birth; N = number on jersey; P = Position (for position name, pause mouse pointer on abbreviation); Name = Name on jersey (for more extensive name, pause mouse pointer on name); Age = age on the day of the signing; Moving from = only indicate the club the player was playing before start playing for this club in this season, for the type of the moving see Status column; Moving to = only indicates the club the player is going to play next, for the type of the moving see Status column; Ends = when the player's current contract ends; n/a = Not applicable.

== Player statistics ==
=== Squad statistics ===
				Total			Liga I		Cupa României	
No.	Pos.	Nat.	Name	Sts	App	Gls	App	Gls	App	Gls
8	RM	(Romania)	Antal	20	29	7	28	7	1	
32	FW	(Romania)	Borbély	2	8	1	8	1		
33	GK	(Romania)	Brăneţ	1	1		1			
9	LM	(Romania)	Buş	5	10	1	9	1	1	
20	RB	(Romania)	Cojoc	1	7		7			
18	CB	(Romania)	Costin	32	32	1	31	1	1	
19	FW	(Romania)	Elek		2		2			
24	DM	(Romania)	Filip	9	11		11			
29	DM	(Romania)	Giurgiu	29	29	5	28	4	1	1
12	GK	(Bosnia and Herzegovina)	Grahovac	33	33		32		1	
15	MF	(Nigeria)	Ibeh	6	9	1	9	1		
14	LM	(Romania)	Ilie	26	30	2	29	2	1	
7	RM	(Romania)	Iorga	15	28	3	28	3		
26	DM	(Romania)	Neagu	27	27		26		1	
11	LM	(Romania)	Ochiroşii	7	16		15		1	
10	AM	(Romania)	Paraschiv	25	27	6	26	6	1	
27	FW	(Romania)	Pena	15	29	8	28	8	1	
21	DF	(Serbia)	Perendija	22	24		23		1	
5	RM	(Romania)	Petean		7		6		1	
19	FW	(Serbia)	Punoševac	3	10	2	10	2		
3	RB	(Romania)	Râpă	34	34	1	33	1	1	
23	LB	(Romania)	Sălăgeanu	29	29	1	29	1		
16	CB	(Romania)	Sârghi	14	16	2	16	2		
37	AM	(Argentina)	Viglianti	19	26	3	25	3	1	

Last updated: 22 May 2011
Source: official website and Viaţa Liberă
Ordered by player name
0 shown as blank

=== Start formations ===
Qnt	Formation	Match(es)
35	4–2–3–1	All matches

Last updated: 22 May 2011
Source: Match reports in Matches
Only competitive matches.

=== Disciplinary records ===
N	Pos.	Nat.	Name	Yellow card	Second yellow card	Red card	Notes
8	RM	(Romania)	Antal	6			
32	FW	(Romania)	Borbély	1	1		
9	LM	(Romania)	Buş	3			
18	CB	(Romania)	Costin	5			
19	FW	(Romania)	Elek	1			
24	DM	(Romania)	Filip	2			
29	DM	(Romania)	Giurgiu	6	1		
12	GK	(Bosnia and Herzegovina)	Grahovac	3			
15	AM	(Nigeria)	Ibeh	1			
14	LM	(Romania)	Ilie	6			
7	RM	(Romania)	Iorga	2		1	
26	DM	(Romania)	Neagu	10			
11	LM	(Romania)	Ochiroşii	4			
10	AM	(Romania)	Paraschiv	3			
30	CB	(Serbia)	Perendija	7			
27	FW	(Romania)	Pena	3			
19	FW	(Serbia)	Punoševac	2			
3	RB	(Romania)	Râpă	4			
16	CB	(Romania)	Sârghi	4		1	
23	LB	(Romania)	Sălăgeanu	6			
37	AM	(Argentina)	Viglianti	3			

Last updated: 22 May 2011
Source: Matches
Only competitive matches
(yellow card) = Number of bookings; (second yellow card) = Number of sending offs after a second yellow card; (red card) = Number of sending offs by a direct red card.

==== Suspensions ====
No.	P	Name	Matches; Banned	Reason for Suspension	Notes	Source
32	FW	Borbély	League:#6	Sent off	Suspension received after two yellow cards against U. Cluj	
26	DM	Neagu	L:7	Cumulative yellows	Suspension received after collecting his fourth yellow card of the season against FC Brașov	
7	RM	Iorga	C:1 and L:9	Sent off (violent conduct)	Suspension received after a straight red card against Unirea Urziceni	
16	CB	Sârghi	L:12	Sent off (violent conduct)	Suspension received after a straight red card against Gloria Bistriţa	
23	LB	Sălăgeanu	L:12	Cumulative yellows	Suspension received after collecting his fourth yellow card of the season against Gloria Bistriţa	
29	DM	Giurgiu	L:14	Sent off	Suspension received after two yellow cards against CFR Cluj	
18	CB	Costin	L:17	Cumulative yellows	Suspension received after collecting his fourth yellow card of the season against Poli Timișoara	
14	LM	Ilie	L:17	Cumulative yellows	Suspension received after collecting his fourth yellow card of the season against Poli Timișoara	
26	DM	Neagu	L:17	Cumulative yellows	Suspension received after collecting his seventh yellow card of the season against Poli Timișoara	
16	CB	Sârghi	L:18	Cumulative yellows	Suspension received after collecting his fourth yellow card of the season against Astra Ploieşti	
29	DM	Giurgiu	L:18	Cumulative yellows	Suspension received after collecting his fourth yellow card of the season against Astra Ploieşti	
11	LM	Ochiroşii	L:24	Cumulative yellows	Suspension received after collecting his fourth yellow card of the season against FC Brașov	
8	RM	Antal	L:25	Cumulative yellows	Suspension received after collecting his fourth yellow card of the season against FC Vaslui	
30	CB	Perendija	L:25	Cumulative yellows	Suspension received after collecting his fourth yellow card of the season against FC Vaslui	
30	CB	Perendija	L:33	Cumulative yellows	Suspension received after collecting his seventh yellow card of the season against Victoria Brăneşti|	

== Club ==
=== Coaching staff ===
Position	Staff
Head coach	(Romania) Dorinel Munteanu
Assistant coach 1	(Romania) Ion Balaur
Assistant coach 2	(Romania) Catălin Ciorman
Fitness coach	(Romania) Ionel Tămăşanu
Goalkeepers coach	(Romania) Tudorel Călugăru

Last updated: 9 June 2010
Source: Otelul-Galati.ro

=== Kit ===
Supplier: Masita
Sponsor(s): ArcelorMittal

Home	Away

Source: "FOTO Echipamentul!". Otelul-Galati.ro.

== Competitions ==
=== Overall ===
	Total	Home	Away
Games played	35	17	18
Games won	21	12	9
Games drawn	7	5	2
Games lost	7	–	7
Biggest win	4–1 vs Urziceni	4–1 vs Urziceni	3–0 vs Urziceni
Biggest loss	0–4 vs FC Vaslui	–	0–4 vs FC Vaslui
Clean sheets	17	8	9
Goals scored	47	29	18
Goals conceded	27	12	15
Goal difference	+20	+17	+3
Average GF per game	1.34	1.71	1
Average GA per game	0.77	0.71	0.83
Yellow cards	82	42	40
Red cards	4	3	1
Most appearances	(Romania) Râpă (34)		
Most minutes played	(Romania) Râpă (3201)		
Top scorer	(Romania) Pena (8)		
Top assister	(Argentina) Viglianti (7)		
Points	70/105 (66.67%)	41/51 (80.39%)	29/54 (53.7%)
Winning rate	60%	70.59%	50%

Last updated: 22 May 2011
Source: Matches

=== Liga I ===
==== League table ====
Pos	Team	Pld	W	D	L	GF	GA	GD	Pts	Qualification or relegation
1	Oțelul Galați (C)	34	21	7	6	46	25	+21	70	Qualification to Champions League group stage
2	Politehnica Timișoara (R)	34	17	15	2	63	38	+25	66	Relegation to Liga II (Note: Timișoara and Gloria Bistrița were denied a licence for the 2011–12 season because of accumulated debt and were therefore relegated to Liga II. Sportul Studențesc as the only team from the relegated sides holding a Liga I licence were hence spared from relegation.)
3	Vaslui	34	18	11	5	51	28	+23	65	Qualification to Champions League third qualifying round
4	Rapid București	34	16	11	7	43	22	+21	59	Qualification to Europa League play-off round
5	Steaua București	34	16	9	9	44	27	+17	57	Qualification to Europa League play-off round (Note: Steaua București won the 2010–11 Cupa României competition and therefore qualified for the play-off round of the 2011–12 UEFA Europa League.)

Source: LPF (in Romanian)
Rules for classification: 1st points; 2nd head-to-head points; 3rd head-to-head goal difference; 4th head-to-head goals scored; 5th overall goal difference; 6th overall goals scored
(C) Champions; (R) Relegated

==== Results summary ====
Overall								Home						Away					
Pld	W	D	L	GF	GA	GD	Pts	W	D	L	GF	GA	GD	W	D	L	GF	GA	GD
34	21	7	6	46	25	+21	70	12	5	0	29	12	+17	9	2	6	17	13	+4

Last updated: 22 May 2010.
Source: Matches

==== Results by round ====
Round	1	2	3	4	5	6	7	8	9	10	11	12	13	14	15	16	17	18	19	20	21	22	23	24	25	26	27	28	29	30	31	32	33	34
Ground	A	H	A	H	A	H	A	H	H	A	H	A	H	A	H	A	H	H	A	H	A	H	A	H	A	A	H	A	H	A	H	A	H	A
Result	W	W	D	W	L	W	L	W	W	W	W	W	D	W	D	L	W	W	W	W	L	W	L	D	W	L	D	D	D	W	W	W	W	W
Position	5	3	4	3	4	3	5	1	1	1	1	1	1	1	1	1	1	1	1	1	1	1	1	1	1	2	1	1	2	2	1	1	1	1

Updated to match(es) played on 22 May 2010. Source: Matches
A = Away; H = Home; W = Win; D = Draw; L = Loss

==== Points by opponent ====
Team	Results		Points
Team	Home	Away	Points
Astra Ploieşti	2–1	1–0	6
FC Brașov	1–0	0–1	3
CFR Cluj	1–1	1–0	4
Dinamo București	3–3	2–1	4
Gaz Metan Mediaş	2–2	2–0	4
Gloria Bistriţa	2–1	0–0	4
Pandurii Târgu Jiu	2–0	3–0	6
Rapid București	1–0	0–0	4
Sportul Studenţesc	1–0	1–0	6
Steaua București	1–0	0–1	3
FCM Târgu Mureş	1–0	0–1	3
FC Timișoara	2–1	0–2	3
Unirea Urziceni	4–1	3–0	6
Universitatea Cluj	3–0	1–2	3
Universitatea Craiova	2–1	1–0	6
FC Vaslui	0–0	0–4	1
Victoria Brăneşti	1–1	2–1	4

Source: FCO

==== Matches ====
Kickoff times are in EET.

23 July 2010 Matchday 1	Sportul Studenţesc	0–1	Oțelul Galați	Bucharest
16:30	Farmache (yellow card) 74'	(Report)	Iorga 4'; Ochiroşii (yellow card) 14'; Sălăgeanu (yellow card) 45'; Sârghi (yellow card) 47'	Stadium: Regie; Attendance: 1,000; Referee: Marius Avram

30 July 2010 Matchday 2	Oțelul Galați	2–0	Pandurii Târgu Jiu	Galați
18:00	Pena 15'; Neagu (yellow card) 50'; Giurgiu (yellow card) 53'; Buş (yellow card) 71'; Sârghi 86'	(Report)	Menassel (yellow card) 84'	Stadium: Oțelul; Attendance: 3,000; Referee: Cristian Balaj

6 August 2010 Matchday 3	FC Rapid	0–0	Oțelul Galați	Bucharest
20:00	Rui Duarte (yellow card) 83'; Bornescu (yellow card) 83'; Ezequias (yellow card) 90+2'	(Report)	Iorga (yellow card) 30'; Ilie (yellow card) 44'; Giurgiu (yellow card) 68'; Grahovac (yellow card) 77'; Neagu (yellow card) 90+2'	Stadium: Giuleşti; Attendance: 7,000; Referee: Robert Dumitru

16 August 2010 Matchday 4	Oțelul Galați	1–0	FCM Târgu Mureş	Galați
18:00	Paraschiv (yellow card) 46'; Neagu (yellow card) 87'; Antal 67' (pen.), (yellow card) 89'	(Report)	Casquero (yellow card) 58'; Roman (red card) 66'	Stadium: Oțelul; Attendance: 4,000; Referee: Dragoş Istrate

22 August 2010 Matchday 5	Universitatea Cluj	2–1	Oțelul Galați	Alba Iulia
18:00	Ionescu (yellow card) 23'; Mendy 34', (yellow card) 54'; Buhuş (yellow card) 45+1'; Boştină (yellow card) 50', (goal) 53' (pen.); Gheorghe (yellow card) 70'; Reinldo (yellow card) 90'; Matache (yellow card) 90+2'	(Report)	Borbély (yellow card) 11' (yellow-red card) 60', (goal) 45+1'; Sârghi (yellow card) 51'; Giurgiu (yellow card) 76'	Stadium: Victoria-Cetate; Referee: Mugurel Drăgănescu

29 August 2010 Matchday 6	Oțelul Galați	1–0	FC Brașov	Galați
18:00	Costin (yellow card) 31', (goal) 89'; Viglianti (yellow card) 32'; Sârghi (yellow card) 43'; Neagu (yellow card) 81'; Antal (yellow card) 89'; Elek (yellow card) 90+4'	(Report)	Oroş (yellow card) 18' (yellow-red card) 72'; Voicu (yellow card) 49'; Martinović (yellow card) 60'; Rusu (red card) 75'; Ilyeş (yellow card) 87'; Cristescu (yellow card) 90+3'	Stadium: Oțelul; Attendance: 4,000; Referee: Alexandru Tudor

13 September 2010 Matchday 7	SC Vaslui	4–0	Oțelul Galați	Vaslui
18:00	Adaílton 8', 55'; Wesley 29'; Farkaš (yellow card) 48'; Hugo Luz (yellow card) 56'; Pouga 69'; Bello (yellow card) 85'	(Report)		Stadium: Municipal; Attendance: 2,000; Referee: Robert Dumitru

18 September 2010 Matchday 8	Oțelul Galați	4–1	Unirea Urziceni	Galați
17:00	Viglianti 5', 70', (yellow card) 37'; Neagu (yellow card) 20'; Iorga (red card) 37'; Giurgiu 60', 90'	(Report)	Todoran 23' (pen.); Muşat (yellow card) 44'	Stadium: Oțelul; Attendance: 4,000; Referee: Andrei Chivulete

26 September 2010 Matchday 9	Oțelul Galați	1–0	Steaua București	Galați
16:30	Sârghi 20'; Sălăgeanu (yellow card) 33'	(Report)	Nicoliţă (yellow card) 26'; Surdu (yellow card) 65'; Tănase (yellow card) 81'	Stadium: Oțelul; Attendance: 12,000; Referee: Istvan Kovacs

1 October 2010 Matchday 10	Dinamo București	1–2	Oțelul Galați	Bucharest
20:30	Dolha (yellow card) 22'; Scarlatache (yellow card) 40'; N'Doye (yellow card) 44'; Bordeanu (yellow card) 47'; Munteanu 72'; Cristea (red card) 88'	(Report)	Sălăgeanu 45', (yellow card) 66'; Costin (yellow card) 70'; Ilie 75', (yellow card) 74'	Stadium: Dinamo; Attendance: 5,000; Referee: Cristian Balaj

17 October 2010 Matchday 11	Oțelul Galați	2–1	Gloria Bistriţa	Galați
15:00	Sârghi (red card) 19'; Sălăgeanu (yellow card) 32'; Ochiroşii (yellow card) 53'; Antal 67'; Viglianti 83' (pen.)	(Report)	Júnior Moraes 20' (pen.); Achim (yellow card) 35'; Szukała (yellow card) 46'; Albuţ (yellow card) 82'	Stadium: Oțelul; Attendance: 4,000; Referee: Teodor Crăciunescu

23 October 2010 Matchday 12	Gaz Metan	0–2	Oțelul Galați	Mediaş
15:00	Silvăşan (yellow card) 47'	(Report)	Perendija (yellow card) 35'; Paraschiv 71', 87'	Stadium: Municipal; Attendance: 6,000; Referee: Ovidiu Haţegan

30 October 2010 Matchday 13	Oțelul Galați	1–1	CFR Cluj	Galați
15:00	Costin (yellow card) 54'; Paraschiv (yellow card) 56'; Iorga 58'; Giurgiu (yellow card) 72' (yellow-red card) 74'	(Report)	Culio (yellow card) 52'; Traoré (yellow card) 54' (yellow-red card) 69'; Veloso (red card) 85'; Peralta 90', (yellow card) 90+1'	Stadium: Oțelul; Attendance: 10,000; Referee: Istvan Kovacs

5 November 2010 Matchday 14	Universitatea Craiova	0–1	Oțelul Galați	Craiova
20:30	Wobay (yellow card) 31'; Bărboianu (yellow card) 56'; Ciucă (red card) 62'; Firţulescu (yellow card) 90+1'	(Report)	Ilie 22', (yellow card) 90+1'; Râpă (yellow card) 90+2'	Stadium: Ion Oblemenco; Attendance: 25,000; Referee: Alexandru Tudor

12 November 2010 Matchday 15	Oțelul Galați	1–1	Victoria Brăneşti	Galați
14:00	Neagu (yellow card) 62'; Paraschiv (yellow card) 75'; Pena 90'	(Report)	Avram 36'; Popa (yellow card) 78'	Stadium: Oțelul; Attendance: 7,000; Referee: Marius Avram

21 November 2010 Matchday 16	FC Timișoara	2–0	Oțelul Galați	Timișoara
20:30	Alexa (yellow card) 9'; Sepsi (yellow card) 36'; Zicu (yellow card) 70'; Čišovský 75'; Nikolić 78', (yellow card) 80'; Chiacu (yellow card) 88' (yellow-red card) 89'	(Report)	Ilie (yellow card) 72'; Costin (yellow card) 74'; Antal (yellow card) 77'; Neagu (yellow card) 90'	Stadium: Dan Păltinişanu; Attendance: 18,000; Referee: Ovidiu Haţegan

27 November 2010 Matchday 17	Oțelul Galați	2–1	Astra Ploieşti	Galați
14:00	Antal 5' (pen.); Filip (yellow card) 52'; Pena 58'; Sârghi (yellow card) 66'; Giurgiu (yellow card) 72'; Sălăgeanu (yellow card) 90+2'	(Report)	Goian (yellow card) 4'; Bornosuzov (yellow card) 55' (yellow-red card) 90'; Tigoianu 63'; Seto (yellow card) 90+2'	Stadium: Oțelul; Attendance: 5,000; Referee: Sebastian Colţescu

5 December 2010 Matchday 18	Oțelul Galați	1–0	Sportul Studenţesc	Galați
13:00	Perendija (yellow card) 60'; Pena 76'; Grahovac (yellow card) 84'	(Report)	Varga (yellow card) 56'	Stadium: Oțelul; Attendance: 6,000; Referee: Teodor Crăciunescu

25 February 2010 Matchday 19	Pandurii Târgu Jiu	0–3	Oțelul Galați	Drobeta-Turnu Severin
14:30		(Report)		Stadium: Municipal
Note: The match wasn't scheduled because Pandurii failed to pay some debts

5 March 2011 Matchday 20	Oțelul Galați	1–0	FC Rapid	Galați
14:30	Pena 67'	(Report)	Herea (yellow card) 43'; Constantin (yellow card) 48' (yellow-red card) 84'; Grigorie (yellow card) 63'	Stadium: Oțelul; Attendance: 12,000; Referee: Cristian Balaj

12 March 2011 Matchday 21	FCM Târgu Mureş	1–0	Oțelul Galați	Târgu Mureş
15:45	Astafei (yellow card) 30'; Diego Ruiz 67'; Didi (yellow card) 70'	(Report)	Râpă (yellow card) 64'	Stadium: Trans-Sil; Attendance: 7,000; Referee: Alexandru Deaconu

19 March 2011 Matchday 22	Oțelul Galați	3–0	Universitatea Cluj	Galați
15:00	Paraschiv 23'; Giurgiu 51'; Perendija (yellow card) 65'; Râpă 70'; Ochiroşii (yellow card) 88'	(Report)	Ascoli (yellow card) 9' (red card) 71'; Cristea (yellow card) 58'; Păcurar (yellow card) 83'	Stadium: Oțelul; Attendance: 9,000; Referee: Robert Dumitru

1 April 2011 Matchday 23	FC Brașov	1–0	Oțelul Galați	Braşov
18:45	Viveiros (yellow card) 29'; Rusu (yellow card) 45'; Ilyeş 89'	(Report)	Giurgiu (yellow card) 22'; Ochiroşii (yellow card) 48'	Stadium: Tineretului; Referee: Marius Avram

6 April 2011 Matchday 24	Oțelul Galați	0–0	SC Vaslui	Galați
17:30	Sălăgeanu (yellow card) 17'; Antal (yellow card) 29'; Perendija (yellow card) 80'	(Report)	Adaílton (yellow card) 7'; Wesley (yellow card) 10'; Papp (yellow card) 55'; Gheorghiu (yellow card) 71'	Stadium: Oțelul; Attendance: 11,000; Referee: Ovidiu Haţegan

9 April 2011 Matchday 25	Unirea Urziceni	0–3	Oțelul Galați	Urziceni
15:00	Rusescu (yellow card) 40'; Pădureţu (yellow card) 82'	(Report)	Ibeh 7'; Costin (yellow card) 26'; Iorga (yellow card) 56', (goal) 75'; Punoševac 90+3'	Stadium: Tineretului; Attendance: 500; Referee: Radu Petrescu

13 April 2011 Matchday 26	Steaua București	1–0	Oțelul Galați	Bucharest
21:30	Maicon 25'; Dică (yellow card) 66'; Nicoliţă (yellow card) 80'	(Report)	Neagu (yellow card) 36'; Ilie (yellow card) 56'; Viglianti (yellow card) 86'; Perendija (yellow card) 90+3'	Stadium: Steaua; Attendance: 5,089; Referee: Istvan Kovacs

16 April 2011 Matchday 27	Oțelul Galați	3–3	Dinamo București	Galați
14:00	Antal 30'; Giurgiu 52'; Pena 54', (yellow card) 55'	(Report)	Munteanu 35'; Ţucudean 86'; Grigore 90'	Stadium: Oțelul; Attendance: 9,000; Referee: Cristian Balaj

24 April 2011 Matchday 28	Gloria Bistriţa	0–0	Oțelul Galați	Bistriţa
16:00	Năstase (yellow card) 26'; Tudose (yellow card) 35'	(Report)	Ibeh (yellow card) 36'; Punoševac (yellow card) 89'	Stadium: Gloria; Attendance: 2,000; Referee: Alexandru Tudor

28 April 2011 Matchday 29	Oțelul Galați	2–2	Gaz Metan	Galați
16:00	Perendija (yellow card) 52'; Antal 61' (pen.); Pena (yellow card) 63', (goal) 79'	(Report)	Bozeşan (yellow card) 14'; Bawab 17', (yellow card) 57'; Vukadinović (yellow card) 20'; Eric Pereira 75'; Pleşca (yellow card) 86'; Miclea (yellow card) 90+1'; Roman (yellow card) 90+2'	Stadium: Oțelul; Attendance: 7,000; Referee: Augustus Constantin

2 May 2011 Matchday 30	CFR Cluj	0–1	Oțelul Galați	Cluj-Napoca
20:00	Rada (yellow card) 22'; Bastos (yellow card) 42'	(Report)	Antal (yellow card) 8', (goal) 81'	Stadium: Dr. Constantin Rădulescu; Attendance: 4,000; Referee: Cristian Balaj

5 May 2011 Matchday 31	Oțelul Galați	2–1	Universitatea Craiova	Galați
21:30	Paraschiv 21', 41'; Filip (yellow card) 87'	(Report)	Zoro (yellow card) 51'; Subotić 54'	Stadium: Oțelul; Attendance: 13,000; Referee: Marius Avram

9 May 2011 Matchday 32	Victoria Brăneşti	1–2	Oțelul Galați	Chiajna
16:00	Zuluf 67', (yellow card) 68'; Iacob (yellow card) 75'; Poverlovici (yellow card) 90+2'	(Report)	Buş (yellow card) 21', (goal) 31'; Perendija (yellow card) 80'; Punoševac (yellow card) 85'; Paraschiv 90'	Stadium: Concordia; Attendance: 3,000; Referee: Georgian Ionescu

15 May 2011 Matchday 33	Oțelul Galați	2–1	FC Timișoara	Galați
20:00	Antal 17'; Buş (yellow card) 49'; Pena 71', (yellow card) 72'; Râpă (yellow card) 78'; Grahovac (yellow card) 87'; Ilie (yellow card) 90+3'	(Report)	Zicu 52'; Alexa (yellow card) 45'	Stadium: Oțelul; Attendance: 13,500; Referee: Robert Dumitru

21 May 2011 Matchday 34	Astra Ploieşti	0–1	Oțelul Galați	Ploieşti
17:00		(Report)	Punoševac 21'; Neagu (yellow card) 87'	Stadium: Astra; Attendance: 2,000; Referee: Radu Petrescu

=== Cupa României ===
23 September 2010 Round of 32	Astra Ploieşti	2–1	Oțelul Galați	Ploieşti
18:30	Lukacs 8', 69', (yellow card) 90+2'; Crăciun (yellow card) 55' (yellow-red card) 89'; Popara (yellow card) 80'	(Report)	Râpă (yellow card) 44'; Antal (yellow card) 59'; Neagu (yellow card) 84'; Giurgiu 90+1'	Stadium: Astra; Attendance: 3,000; Referee: Sebastian Colţescu

=== Friendlies ===
Germany training camp

4 July 2010	Oțelul Galați (Romania)	2–1	(Czech Republic) Dynamo Budějovice	Traun, Austria
18:00	Paraschiv 52'; Iorga 54'	(Report)	Pecka 49'	Stadium: Haka-Arena

6 July 2010	Oțelul Galați (Romania)	3–0	(Azerbaijan) Neftchi Baku	Salzburg
18:00	Giurgiu 5'; Pena 24' (pen.); Avram 86'	(Report)

8 July 2010	Oțelul Galați (Romania)	0–0	(Germany) Wacker Burghausen	Marktl
19:00		(Report)

10 July 2010	Oțelul Galați (Romania)	19–0	(Austria) SK St. Johann	Marktl
19:00	Elek 2', 9', 38'; Avram 7', 13', 21', 34', 41', 52', 75'; Petean 23', 87'; Buş 35', 43'; Cucu 59'; Pena 62'; Cârjă 70'; Perendija 79'; Giurgiu 82'	(Report)

13 July 2010	Oțelul Galați (Romania)	1–1	(Hungary) Ferencvárosi TC	Eugendorf, Austria
19:00	Elek 68'	(Report)	Tóth 79'

14 July 2010	Oțelul Galați (Romania)	1–1	(Saudi Arabia) Al-Ahli Jeddah	Bad Endorf
19:00	Ochiroşii 32'	(Report)	Marcinho 36'

4 September 2010	Astra Ploieşti	1–1	Oțelul Galați	Ploieşti
20:00	Miranda 53'	(Report)	Paraschiv 70'	Stadium: Astra

9 October 2010	Oțelul Galați	2–1	Astra Ploieşti	Galați
15:00	Paraschiv 20'; Goian 60' (o.g.)	(Report)	Popara 74'	Stadium: Oțelul; Attendance: 100; Referee: Viorel Cojocaru

22 January 2011	ASF Zărneşti	0–8	Oțelul Galați	Zărneşti
12:00		(Report)	Paraschiv 4', 38'; Punoševac 5', 22', 44'; Costin 34'; Pena 67'; Viglianti 83'

Cyprus training camp

7 February 2011	Oțelul Galați (Romania)	6–0	(Poland) GKS Bełchatów	Larnaca
10:30	Giurgiu 38' (pen.); Iorga 39'; Pena 50', 52', 81', 83'	(Report)		Stadium: Alpha Sport Center

9 February 2011	Oțelul Galați (Romania)	3–0	(Armenia) FC Pyunik	Larnaca
19:00	Viglianti 2', 28'; Borbély 44'	(Report)		Stadium: Alpha Sport Center

11 February 2011	Oțelul Galați (Romania)	0–2	(Poland) Korona Kielce	Larnaca
17:30		(Report)	Andradina 7'; Niedzielan 19'	Stadium: Alpha Sport Center

13 February 2011	Oțelul Galați (Romania)	2–2	(Czech Republic) Slovan Liberec	Larnaca
17:00	Buş 53'; Râpă 70'	(Report)	Nezmar 55'; Papoušek 72'	Stadium: Alpha Sport Center

15 February 2011	Oțelul Galați (Romania)	2–0	(Poland) Śląsk Wrocław	Larnaca
16:30	Pena 77'; Fojut 83' (o.g.)	(Report)		Stadium: Alpha Sport Center

17 February 2011	Oțelul Galați (Romania)	2–2	(Bulgaria) Levski Sofia	Larnaca
17:30	Iorga 17' (pen.); Viglianti 65'	(Report)	Dembélé 28' (pen.); Gagev 85' (pen.)	Stadium: Alpha Sport Center

25 February 2011	Dunărea Galați	2–1	Oțelul Galați	Galați
15:00	Velescu 61'; Chelaru 79'	(Report)	Buş 68'	Stadium: Dunărea

25 March 2011	ACSMU Poli Iaşi	1–0	Oțelul Galați	Iaşi
18:00	Gado 22'	(Report)	Cojoc (yellow card) 75'	Stadium: Emil Alexandrescu; Attendance: 1,000

== See also ==
- FC Oțelul Galați
- 2010–11 Liga I
- 2010–11 Cupa României
