= 2012–13 FC Oțelul Galați season =

FC Oțelul Galați
2012–13 season
- Chairman: Narcis Răducan (from Oct 18, 2012)
- Manager: Dorinel Munteanu (until Aug 30, 2012); Viorel Tănase (from Aug 30, 2012); Petre Grigoraș (from Feb 1, 2013)
- Liga I: 6th
- Cupa României: Round of 32

The 2012–13 season will be Oțelul Galați's 21st consecutive season in the Liga I, and their 24th overall season in the top-flight of Romanian football.

== Players ==
=== Transfers ===
==== In ====
No.	Pos.	Nat.	Name	Age	EU	Moving from	Type	Transfer window	Ends	Transfer fee	Source
15	CB	(Romania)	Mardare	24	EU	Debrecen (Hungary)	Transfer	Summer	2015	Free	
30	MF	(Romania)	Băjenaru	29	EU	Astra Ploiești	Transfer	Summer	Undisclosed	Undisclosed	
88	RM	(France)	Inkango	28	EU	Kastrioti Kruje (Albania)	Transfer	Summer	Undisclosed	Undisclosed	
90	MF	(Romania)	Zaharia	22	EU	CS Turnu Severin	Transfer	Winter	2016	Undisclosed	
23	FW	(Romania)	Vancea	28	EU	CS Turnu Severin	Transfer	Winter	2015	Undisclosed	
21	MF	(Romania)	Astafei	25	EU	Gaz Metan Mediaș	Transfer	Winter	2016	€ 200,000	
9	FW	(Chile)	Gazale	28	Non-EU	Universidad Católica (Chile)	Transfer	Winter	2015	Free	
8	CM	(Brazil)	Marquinhos	20	Non-EU	Paraná (Brazil)	Transfer	Winter	2017	Free	
3	RB	(Brazil)	Antunes	20	Non-EU	Flamengo (Brazil)	Transfer	Winter	2017	Free	

==== Out ====
No.	Pos.	Nat.	Name	Age	EU	Moving to	Type	Transfer window	Transfer fee	Source
11	LM	(Romania)	Frunză	34	EU	Brăila	Contract expired	Summer	–	
8	RM	(Romania)	Antal	23	EU	Vaslui	Transfer	Summer	€ 500,000	
23	LB	(Romania)	Sălăgeanu	29	EU	Vaslui	Transfer	Summer	€ 200,000	
17	LM	(Romania)	Buș	25	EU		Mutual consent	Winter	–	
37	MF	(Romania)	Viglianti	33	EU		Retired	Winter	–	
	MF	(Romania)	Enescu	25	EU		Mutual consent	Winter	–	
	CF	(Romania)	Chipirliu	20	EU	Dunărea Galați	Transfer	Winter	Undisclosed	
15	DF	(Romania)	Mardare	25	EU	Rapid București	Transfer	Winter	Undisclosed	
19	CF	(Serbia)	Punosevac	25	EU	FCM Târgu Mureș (Romania)	Transfer	Winter	Undisclosed	
3	DF	(Romania)	Râpă	23	EU	Steaua București	Transfer	Winter	Undisclosed	
27	ST	(Romania)	Pena	27	EU	Baku (Azerbaijan)	Transfer	Winter	Undisclosed	
55	CB	(Serbia)	Perendija	27	Non-EU	Mordovia Saransk (Russia)	Transfer	Winter	Undisclosed	
93	RM	(France)	Inkango	28	EU		Mutual consent	Winter	Undisclosed	

EU = if holds or not a European Union passport; Country: when 2 flags, 1st flag = country that plays for internationally, 2nd flag = country of birth; N = number on jersey; P = Position (for position name, pause mouse pointer on abbreviation); Name = Name on jersey (for more extensive name, pause mouse pointer on name); Age = age on the day of the signing; Moving from = only indicate the club the player was playing before start playing for this club in this season, for the type of the moving see Status column; Moving to = only indicates the club the player is going to play next, for the type of the moving see Status column; Ends = when the player's current contract ends; n/a = Not applicable.

== Player statistics ==
=== Squad statistics ===
				Total			Liga I		Cupa României	
No.	Pos.	Nat.	Name	Sts	App	Gls	App	Gls	App	Gls
30	AM	(Romania)	Băjenaru	2	5		5			
6	CB	(Romania)	Benga	5	5		5			
1	GK	(Romania)	Brăneţ	7	7		7			
17	LM	(Romania)	Buş	4	4		4			
18	CB	(Romania)	Costin	8	8		8			
	LB	(Romania)	Cucu	1	1		1			
4	DM	(Romania)	Filip	2	3		3			
29	DM	(Romania)	Giurgiu	9	9		9			
12	GK	(Serbia)	Grahovac	2	2		2			
14	LM	(Romania)	Ilie	1	1		1			
88	RM	(France)	Inkango	4	8	3	8	3		
7	RM	(Romania)	Iorga	6	8	2	8	2		
5	LB	(Serbia)	Ljubinković	6	7		7			
23	CB	(Romania)	Murgoci		1		1			
77	DM	(Romania)	Neagu	4	6		6			
27	ST	(Romania)	Pena	6	8		8			
55	CB	(Serbia)	Perendija	8	8		8			
19	FW	(Serbia)	Punoševac	1	7	1	7	1		
3	RB	(Romania)	Râpă	9	9		9			
16	CB	(Romania)	Sârghi	1	2		2			
11	FW	(Slovenia)	Štromajer	7	9	1	9	1		
37	AM	(Argentina)	Viglianti	6	8	4	8	4		

Last updated: 11 August 2012
Source: official website and Viaţa Liberă
Ordered by player name
0 shown as blank

=== Start formations ===
Qnt	Formation	Matches	
Qnt	Formation	Liga I	Cupa României
22	4–2–3–1	All matches	All matches

Last updated: 26 September 2012
Source: Match reports in Competitions
Only competitive matches.

=== Disciplinary records ===
N	Pos.	Nat.	Name	Yellow card	Second yellow card	Red card	Notes
30	AM	(Romania)	Băjenaru	1			
6	CB	(Romania)	Benga	3			
17	LM	(Romania)	Buş	1			
18	CB	(Romania)	Costin	3			
29	DM	(Romania)	Giurgiu	3			
7	RM	(Romania)	Iorga	1			
5	LB	(Serbia)	Ljubinković			1	
77	DM	(Romania)	Neagu	2			
55	CB	(Serbia)	Perendija	3			
27	ST	(Romania)	Pena	4	1		
3	RB	(Romania)	Râpă	2			
16	CB	(Romania)	Sârghi	1			
37	AM	(Argentina)	Viglianti	2			

Last updated: 26 September 2012
Source: Matches
Only competitive matches
(yellow card) = Number of bookings; (second yellow card) = Number of sending offs after a second yellow card; (red card) = Number of sending offs by a direct red card.

==== Suspensions ====
No.	P	Name	Matches; Banned	Reason for Suspension	Notes	Source
5	LB	Ljubinković	League #4	Sent off	Suspension received after a straight red card against Petrolul	
27	FW	Pena	League #9	Sent off	Suspension received after two yellow cards against Viitorul	

== Competitions ==
=== Overall ===
	Total	Home	Away
Games played	9	4	5
Games won	1	–	1
Games drawn	4	3	1
Games lost	4	1	3
Biggest win	2–1 vs CSMS Iaşi	–	2–1 vs CSMS Iaşi
Biggest loss	1–2 vs Petrolul	1–2 vs CFR Cluj	1–2 vs Petrolul
Clean sheets	0	0	0
Goals scored	11	4	7
Goals conceded	14	5	9
Goal difference	-3	-1	-2
Average GF per game	1.22	1	1.4
Average GA per game	1.56	1.25	1.8
Yellow cards	26	9	17
Red cards	2	1	1
Most appearances	Giurgiu, Râpă, Štromajer (9)		
Most minutes played	Giurgiu, Râpă (849)		
Top scorer	(Argentina) Viglianti (4)		
Top assister	Pena (3)		
Points	7/27(25.93%)	3/12(25%)	4/15(26.67%)
Winning rate	11.11%	0%	20%

Last updated: 26 September 2012
Source: Matches

=== Liga I ===
==== League table ====
Pos	Team	Pld	W	D	L	GF	GA	GD	Pts
9	CFR Cluj	34	12	13	9	56	39	+17	49 (Note: CFR 0-0 RAP; RAP 3-2 CFR)
10	Gaz Metan Mediaș	34	12	10	12	42	46	−4	46
11	Oțelul Galați (Note: Oțelul Galați were deducted two points because of debts owed to agent Codoban Tătar Ionel.)	34	11	10	13	38	42	−4	41
12	Universitatea Cluj	34	10	8	16	39	55	−16	38
13	Viitorul Constanța	34	8	12	14	45	57	−12	36

Source: Liga I (in Romanian)
Rules for classification: 1) points; 2) head-to-head points; 3) head-to-head goal difference; 4) head-to-head goals scored; 5) goal difference; 6) number of goals scored.

==== Results summary ====
Overall								Home						Away					
Pld	W	D	L	GF	GA	GD	Pts	W	D	L	GF	GA	GD	W	D	L	GF	GA	GD
19	5	7	7	23	27	−4	22	3	4	2	10	9	+1	2	3	5	13	18	−5

Last updated: 20 December 2012.
Source: Matches

==== Results by round ====
Round	1	2	3	4	5	6	7	8	9	10	11	12	13	14	15	16	17	18	19	20	21	22	23	24	25	26	27	28	29	30	31	32	33	34
Ground	A	H	A	H	A	H	A	H	A	H	A	H	A	H	A	H	A	H	A	H	A	H	A	H	A	H	A	H	A	H	A	H	A	H
Result	W	D	L	L	L	D	L	D	D	D	D	W	D	W	L	W	L	L	W															
Position	6	9	13	15	15	15	16	16	16	15	15	15	15	15	15	13	14	14	13															

Updated to match(es) played on 20 December 2012. Source: Matches
A = Away; H = Home; W = Win; D = Draw; L = Loss

==== Points by opponent ====
Team	Results		Points
Team	Home	Away	Points
Astra Ploieşti	2–1		3
FC Brașov	0–0		1
Ceahlăul		1–4	0
CFR Cluj	1–2		0
Concordia Chiajna		0–0	1
CSMS Iaşi	0–3	2–1	3
Dinamo București		1–2	0
Gaz Metan Mediaş	0–0		1
Gaz Metan Severin		1–1	1
Gloria Bistriţa	1–1		1
Pandurii Târgu Jiu		2–3	0
Petrolul Ploieşti		1–2	0
Rapid București	1–1	3–2	4
Steaua București		1–2	0
Universitatea Cluj		1–1	1
FC Vaslui	2–0		3
Viitorul Constanța	1–1		1

Source: FCO

==== Matches ====
Kickoff times are in EET.

22 July 2012 Matchday 1	CSMS Iaşi	1–2	Oțelul Galați	Iaşi
19:00	Jovanović (yellow card) 50'; Ionescu (yellow card) 54', (goal) 59'	(Report)	Iorga 51' (pen.), (yellow card) 90'; Râpă (yellow card) 56'; Viglianti 80'; Giurgiu (yellow card) 82'	Stadium: Emil Alexandrescu; Referee: Radu Petrescu

30 July 2012 Matchday 2	Oțelul Galați	1–1	Rapid București	Galați
20:20	Viglianti 27'; Buș (yellow card) 31'; Pena (yellow card) 87'	(Report)	Constantin (yellow card) 40'; Božović (yellow card) 69'; Grigore 73'	Stadium: Oțelul; Attendance: 8,000; Referee: Alexandru Tudor

4 August 2012 Matchday 3	Petrolul Ploieşti	2–1	Oțelul Galați	Ploieşti
21:30	Boudjemaa 20', 82'; Guilherme Sitya (yellow card) 36'; Bornescu (yellow card) 79'	(Report)	Ljubinković (red card) 1'; Perendija (yellow card) 20'; Sârghi (yellow card) 30'; Benga (yellow card) 41'; Costin (yellow card) 46'; Inkango 89'	Stadium: Ilie Oană; Attendance: 10,000; Referee: Cristian Balaj

13 August 2012 Matchday 4	Oțelul Galați	1–2	CFR Cluj	Galați
18:00	Inkango 38'; Costin (yellow card) 42'; Perendija (yellow card) 69'	(Report)	Mureșan 7' (pen.), (red card) 22'; Vass (yellow card) 39'; Ronny 53'; Godemèche (yellow card) 79'	Stadium: Oțelul; Attendance: 8,000; Referee: Sebastian Colţescu

20 August 2012 Matchday 5	Pandurii Târgu Jiu	3–2	Oțelul Galați	Târgu Jiu
18:00	Matulevičius (yellow card) 6'; Maxim 19' (pen.); Boutadjine 72', (yellow card) 85', (goal) 90+3'	(Report)	Viglianti (yellow card) 22'; Pena (yellow card) 26'; Iorga 62' (pen.); Giurgiu (yellow card) 70'; Benga (yellow card) 86'; Inkango 90'	Stadium: Tudor Vladimirescu; Attendance: 7,000; Referee: Alexandru Tudor

25 August 2012 Matchday 6	Oțelul Galați	1–1	Gloria Bistriţa	Galați
18:00	Benga (yellow card) 15'; Štromajer 65'	(Report)	Markisio 29'; Curtuiuș (yellow card) 38'; Ayza (yellow card) 59'; Romário (yellow card) 71'; Tudose (yellow card) 77'	Stadium: Oțelul; Attendance: 6,000; Referee: Ovidiu Haţegan

2 September 2012 Matchday 7	Steaua București	2–1	Oțelul Galați	București
17:55	Adi Rocha 3'; Pintilii 8'; Szukała (yellow card) 64'	(Report)	Viglianti 13'; Neagu (yellow card) 44'; Giurgiu (yellow card) 58'; Pena (yellow card) 66'; Râpă (yellow card) 80'	Stadium: Steaua; Attendance: 12,230; Referee: Cătălin Popa

16 September 2012 Matchday 8	Oțelul Galați	1–1	Viitorul Constanța	Galați
18:00	Viglianti 17'; Costin (yellow card) 25'; Pena (yellow card) 34' (yellow-red card) 90+2'; Neagu (yellow card) 52'; Perendija (yellow card) 74'	(Report)	Dică 25' (pen.); Alibec (yellow card) 43'; Mladen (yellow card) 66'; Vâtcă (yellow card) 90'	Stadium: Oțelul; Attendance: 4,000; Referee: Iulian Dima

22 September 2012 Matchday 9	Gaz Metan Severin	1–1	Oțelul Galați	Drobeta-Turnu Severin
19:00	Thomas 45+1'; Golić (yellow card) 73'	(Report)	Viglianti (yellow card) 5'; Punoševac 20'; Băjenaru (yellow card) 29'	Stadium: Municipal; Attendance: 2,500; Referee: Istvan Kovacs

30 September 2012 Matchday 10	Oțelul Galați	0–0	FC Brașov	Galați
17:00	Punoševac (yellow card) 90+3'	(Report)	Popa (yellow card) 86'; Ionescu (yellow card) 90+3'	Stadium: Oțelul; Attendance: 4,000; Referee: Marian Balaci

8 October 2012 Matchday 11	Concordia Chiajna	0–0	Oțelul Galați	Chiajna
21:30	Bambara (red card) 53'; Popovici (yellow card) 68'; Purece (yellow card) 78'; Wellington Carlos (yellow card) 86'; Cretu (yellow card) 90'	(Report)	Neagu (yellow card) 5'; Filip (yellow card) 33'; Costin (yellow card) 69'; Šipović (yellow card) 88'	Stadium: Concordia; Attendance: 1,500; Referee: Dan Florin Dreve

20 October 2012 Matchday 12	Oțelul Galați	2–1	Astra Ploiești	Galați
19:00	Pena 57' (pen.) (yellow card) 70'; Šipović (yellow card) 90+4'; Inkango 90+5'; Paraschiv (yellow card) 90+6'	(Report)	Fatai (yellow card) 4', (goal) 51'; Tembo (yellow card) 43'; Găman (yellow card) 56'; Bukari (yellow card) 79'	Stadium: Oțelul; Attendance: 4,500; Referee: Istvan Kovacs

26 October 2012 Matchday 13	Universitatea Cluj	1–1	Oțelul Galați	Cluj-Napoca
19:00	Cleiton 2'; Erico (yellow card) 12'; Paulinho (yellow card) 24'; Pătrașcu (yellow card) 30'	(Report)	Paraschiv 32'; Šipović (yellow card) 45'; Sârghi (yellow card) 75'	Stadium: Cluj Arena; Attendance: 4,000; Referee: Marcel Bîrsan

4 November 2012 Matchday 14	Oțelul Galați	2–0	Gaz Metan Mediaș	Galați
19:00	Giurgiu 14'; Pena 60'; Brăneț (yellow card) 90+2'	(Report)	Negru (yellow card) 59'	Stadium: Oțelul; Attendance: 4,000; Referee: Teodor Crăciunescu

10 November 2012 Matchday 15	Ceahlăul Piatra Neamț	4–1	Oțelul Galați	Piatra Neamț
16:00	Bădescu 18'; Aloisio 48'; Stana 80', (yellow card) 80', (goal) 87'	(Report)	Cârjă (yellow card) 24'; Giurgiu 73'; Šipović (yellow card) 86'	Stadium: Ceahlăul; Attendance: 3,000; Referee: Istvan Kovacs

17 November 2012 Matchday 16	Oțelul Galați	2–0	FC Vaslui	Galați
20:00	Iorga (yellow card) 3', (goal) 19'; Neagu (yellow card) 53'; Sîrghi (yellow card) 68'; Pena (yellow card) 73' (red card) 78'; Filip (yellow card) 76'; Viglianti 90+3'	(Report)	Jumisse (yellow card) 31'	Stadium: Oțelul; Attendance: 5,000; Referee: Paul Unimatan

24 November 2012 Matchday 17	Dinamo București	2–1	Oțelul Galați	București
20:30	Alexe 17' (pen.); Matei 32' (pen.); Țucudean (yellow card) 42'; Munteanu (yellow card) 61'; Matei (yellow card) 79'	(Report)	Perendija (yellow card) 31'; Murgoci (yellow card) 45+2'; Rus 60' (o.g.)	Stadium: Arena Națională; Attendance: 3,000; Referee: Lucian Rusandu

3 December 2012 Matchday 18	Oțelul Galați	0–3	CSMS Iaşi	Galați
18:00	Neagu (yellow card) 32'; Băjenaru (yellow card) 43'; Šipović (yellow card) 85'	(Report)	Onofraș 35', 74', 90+1'; Nalați (yellow card) 68'	Stadium: Oțelul; Attendance: 2,500; Referee: Ovidiu Hațegan

8 December 2012 Matchday 19	Rapid București	2–3	Oțelul Galați	București
20:30	Herea 29'; Roman (yellow card) 42'; Ioniță 53'; Wallace (red card) 58'; Pancu (yellow card) 90'	(Report)	Pena 31', 39', 63'; Sîrghi (yellow card) 60'; Ljubinković (yellow card) 75'; Brăneț (yellow card) 90+3'	Stadium: Giuleşti-Valentin Stănescu; Attendance: 3,000; Referee: Istvan Kovacs

24 February 2013 Matchday 20	Oțelul Galați	0–1	Petrolul Ploieşti	Galați
18:00	Ljubinković (yellow card) 19'; Giurgiu (yellow card) 23'	(Report)	Bokila (yellow card) 21', (goal) 80'; Hamza (yellow card) 63'; Geraldo (yellow card) 89'	Stadium: Oțelul; Attendance: 6,000; Referee: Alexandru Tudor

2 March 2013 Matchday 21	Oțelul Galați	0–1	CFR Cluj	Cluj-Napoca
21:30	Sepsi (yellow card) 23'; Piccolo (yellow card) 54'; Felgueiras (yellow card) 79'; Camora (yellow card) 79'; Godemèche (yellow card) 79' (yellow-red card) 90+1'	(Report)	Paraschiv 7'; Sârghi (yellow card) 50'; Iorga (yellow card) 61'; Filip (yellow card) 66'; Grahovac (yellow card) 89'	Stadium: Dr. Constantin Rădulescu; Attendance: 2,000; Referee: Sebastian Colţescu

=== Cupa României ===
26 September 2012 R32	Sportul Studențesc	0–1	Oțelul Galați	București
15:00	Șerban (yellow card) 36'; Lung (yellow card) 72'	(Report)	Inkango 28'	Stadium: Juventus; Attendance: 500; Referee: Andrei Chivulete

1 November 2012 R16	Oțelul Galați	3–0	CF Brăila	Galați
18:45	Băjenaru 24', 62'; Perendija (yellow card) 75'; Didi 88'	(Report)	Sânmărtean (yellow card) 71'; Spiridon (yellow card) 82'	Stadium: Oțelul; Attendance: 4,000; Referee: George Găman

28 November 2012 QF	Ceahlăul Piatra Neamț	0–2	Oțelul Galați	Piatra Neamț
17:45	Vițelaru (yellow card) 83'	(Report)	Iorga 11'; Perendija (yellow card) 19'; Neagu (yellow card) 52'; Băjenaru 65'; Giurgiu (yellow card) 85'	Stadium: Ceahlăul; Attendance: 1,500; Referee: Marcel Bîrsan

18 April 2013 Semi-final (first leg)	Oțelul Galați	0–3	Petrolul Ploiești	Galați
20:30			Alves 3'; Cojoc 60' (o.g.); Bokila 71'	Stadium: Stadionul Oțelul; Attendance: 4.000; Referee: Radu Marian Petrescu

21 May 2013 Semi-final (second leg)	Petrolul Ploiești	1–2 (4–2 agg.)	Oțelul Galați	Ploiești
20:30	Bokila 57'		Paraschiv 9'; Iorga 89' (pen.)	Stadium: Ilie Oană; Attendance: 9.000; Referee: Cristian Pavel Balaj

=== Friendlies ===
==== Netherlands training camp ====
4 July 2012	Oțelul Galați (Romania)	2–0	(Germany) Viktoria Köln	Heelsum
19:00	Ogbuke 15'; Enescu 18'	(Report)

5 July 2012	Oțelul Galați (Romania)	2–0	(Saudi Arabia) Al-Faisaly	Heelsum
20:00	Šipović 81'; Giurgiu 85'	(Report)		Stadium: Bilderberg Hotel Klein Zwitserland

7 July 2012	Waasland-Beveren (Belgium)	1–2	(Romania) Oțelul Galați	Melsele
19:00	Snelders 70'	(Report)	Băjenaru 81'; Štromajer 90+2'

10 July 2012	Oțelul Galați (Romania)	1–0	(Greece) PAOK	Heelsum
18:30	Pena 31'	(Report)

13 July 2012	Standard Liège (Belgium)	1–0	(Romania) Oțelul Galați	Hasselt
20:30	Ignacio González 4' (pen.)	(Report)		Attendance: 1,000

==== Local friendlies ====
13 October 2012	Oțelul Galați	1–0	Viitorul Constanța	Galați
16:00	Štromajer 32'	(Report)		Stadium: Stadionul Oțelul

==== Spain training camp ====
===== Marbella Cup =====
4 February 2013 QF	Oțelul Galați (Romania)	0–1	(Ukraine) Dynamo Kyiv	San Pedro de Alcántara
17:00		(Report)	Tsurikov 62'	Stadium: San Pedro

7 February 2013 5-8 places	Oțelul Galați (Romania)	1–0	(Bulgaria) Ludogorets Razgrad	Marbella
14:40	Iorga 44' (pen.)	(Report)		Stadium: Municipal

10 February 2013 5th place match	Oțelul Galați	0–4	Rapid București	San Pedro de Alcántara
12:00		(Report)	Grigorie 14'; Abrudan 18'; Herea 70', 90+1'	Stadium: San Pedro

===== Other friendlies =====
12 February 2013	Oțelul Galați (Romania)	1–1	(Brazil) Atlético Paranaense	Sotogrande
11:00	Curelea 26'	(Report)	Bruno Furlan 48'

13 February 2013	Oțelul Galați (Romania)	1–1	(Georgia (country)) Torpedo Kutaisi	Sotogrande
17:30	Vancea 67'	(Report)	Pantsulaia 69'

15 February 2013	Oțelul Galați (Romania)	1–2	(Russia) Spartak Moscow	Marbella
18:00	Iorga 74'	(Report)	Majeed 45', 55'	Stadium: Municipal

== See also ==
- FC Oțelul Galați
- 2012–13 Liga I
- 2012–13 Cupa României
