= 2011 Supercupa României =

- Event: 2011 Supercupa României
Oțelul Galați	Steaua București
Liga I	Cupa României
1	0
- Date: 17 July 2011
- Venue: Stadionul Ceahlăul, Piatra Neamț
- Man of the Match: Buș
- Referee: Robert Dumitru (Romania)
- Attendance: 13,253
- Weather: Cloudy night

The 2011 Supercupa României was the 13th edition of Romania's season opener cup competition.

== Match ==
=== Details ===
17 July 2011
20:45 EEST

Oțelul Galați	1–0	Steaua București
Buș 14'	Report

Stadionul Ceahlăul, Piatra Neamț
Attendance: 13,253
Referee: Robert Dumitru (Romania)

Oțelul Galați	Steaua București

OȚELUL:
GK	1	(Serbia) Branko Grahovac	(yellow card) 90'
RB	3	(Romania) Cornel Râpă	(yellow card) 89'
CB	30	(Serbia) Milan Perendija	(yellow card) 79'	(substituted off) 81'
CB	18	(Romania) Sergiu Costin (c)
LB	23	(Romania) Adrian Sălăgeanu
DM	26	(Romania) Ionuț Neagu
DM	29	(Romania) Gabriel Giurgiu		(substituted off) 4'
RW	8	(Romania) Liviu Antal	(yellow card) 69'
AM	15	(Nigeria) John Ibeh
LW	17	(Romania) Laurențiu Buș
FW	10	(Romania) Gabriel Paraschiv	(yellow card) 40'	(substituted off) 66'
Substitutes:
GK	12	(Romania) Cristian Brăneț
CB	16	(Romania) Cristian Sârghi		(substituted on) 81'
AM	37	(Argentina) Gabriel Viglianti		(substituted on) 4'
LW	14	(Romania) Silviu Ilie
LW	33	(Romania) Sorin Frunză
FW	27	(Romania) Marius Pena		(substituted on) 66'
FW	19	(Serbia) Bratislav Punoševac
Manager:
(Romania) Dorinel Munteanu

STEAUA:
GK	12	(Romania) Ciprian Tătărușanu (c)
RB	18	(Serbia) Novak Martinović	(yellow card) 59'
CB	22	(Romania) George Galamaz
CB	6	(Romania) Florin Gardoș
LB	14	(Romania) Iasmin Latovlevici
RW	16	(Romania) Bănel Nicoliță	(yellow card) 57'
CM	26	(Romania) Eric Bicfalvi	(yellow card) 51'
CM	5	(Argentina) Pablo Brandán	(yellow card) 39'
LW	10	(Romania) Cristian Tănase		(substituted off) 10'
FW	77	(Brazil) Leandro Tatu
FW	24	(Romania) Raul Rusescu	(yellow card) 66'
Substitutes:
GK	1	(Romania) Răzvan Stanca
RB	2	(Romania) Gabriel Matei
CB	4	(Bulgaria) Valentin Iliev
LB	19	(Romania) Valeriu Lupu
DF	3	(Romania) Florin Bejan
CM	47	(Romania) Dorinel Popa
CM	30	(Romania) Liviu Băjenaru		(substituted on) 10'
Manager:
(Israel) Ronny Levy

MAN OF THE MATCH

- (Romania) Laurențiu Buș (Oțelul)

MATCH OFFICIALS

- Assistant referees:
  - Cristian Nica
  - Aurel Onița
- Fourth official:
  - Emil Voicu

MATCH RULES

- 90 minutes.
- 30 minutes of extra-time if necessary.
- Penalty shoot-out if scores still level.
- Seven named substitutes.
- Maximum of three substitutions.

== See also ==
- 2011–12 Liga I
- 2011–12 Cupa României
