= Bruce Inkango =

French-Congolese footballer (born 1984)

Personal information
- Full name: Bruce Pascal Inkango
- Date of birth: 18 May 1984 (age 42)
- Place of birth: Poitiers, France
- Height: 1.72 m (5 ft 8 in)
- Position: Forward

Senior career*
Years	Team	Apps	(Gls)
2000–2003	Cannes	11	(3)
2003–2004	Neuchâtel Xamax	0	(0)
2004–2006	Angers	20	(1)
2004	→ RCF Paris (loan)	7	(2)
2006–2007	Poitiers		
2007–2009	AS Cherbourg	59	(14)
2009–2010	Red Star	20	(5)
2010	Gillingham	5	(0)
2011–2012	Kastrioti	37	(21)
2012	Oțelul Galați	12	(4)
2013	Cherno More	10	(4)
2013	Denizlispor	0	(0)
2014	East Fife	4	(0)
- * Club domestic league appearances and goals

Bruce Pascal Inkango (born 18 May 1984) is a French-Congolese former professional footballer who played as a forward.

== Career ==
Born in Poitiers, Inkango began his career at Cannes.

On 21 September 2010, Inkango joined English side Gillingham of League Two, signing a three-month deal. He earned just six appearances with the Gills and left the club on 20 December, when his contract expired.

Early 2011, Inkango signed for Albanian Superliga side KS Kastrioti. Whilst at the Albanian club, he found some of the best scoring form of his career. Inkango finished as the top goalscorer for Kastrioti in the 2011–12 season with 14 goals, scoring a total of 21 goals for one and a half yeara.

In July 2012, Inkango joined Oțelul Galați in Romania. He made his Liga I debut in a 1–1 home draw against Rapid București on 30 July, coming on as a substitute for Laurențiu Buș. He was released by Oțelul on 31 January 2013.

On 4 April 2013, Inkango signed a contract with Bulgarian A PFG club Cherno More Varna. He made his debut on 6 April, coming off the bench on the 69th minute to replace Simeon Raykov in a 3–1 away loss against Botev Plovdiv.

After a spell playing in Turkey for Denizlispor, Inkango signed for East Fife in March 2014. He was released by the club in May 2014.
