= Csaba Borbély =

Romanian footballer

Personal information
- Full name: Csaba László Borbély
- Date of birth: 5 July 1980 (age 46)
- Place of birth: Oradea, Romania
- Height: 1.81 m (5 ft 11 1/2 in)
- Position: Forward

Youth career
- 1992: Profim Oradea
- 1992–1996: LEFS Oradea
- 1996–1999: Viitorul Oradea
- 1999: Arcadia Oradea

Senior career*
Years	Team	Apps	(Gls)
1999–2000	Szombathelyi Haladás	24	(2)
2000	Astra Ploieşti	2	(0)
2000–2001	Metalul Plopeni	19	(1)
2001	Hutteen	20	(15)
2001–2002	Bihor Oradea	11	(2)
2002–2003	Astra Ploieşti	11	(1)
2003–2004	FC U Craiova	33	(3)
2004–2005	FC Oradea	11	(0)
2005–2006	Ferencváros	5	(0)
2006–2008	Progresul București	27	(3)
2008–2010	Gloria Bistriţa	23	(6)
2010–2011	Oțelul Galați	11	(3)
2011	CF Brăila	8	(0)
2012	Prahova Tomșani		
2012–2013	Fortuna Brazi		
2013	FC Zagon		
2014	Putnok	3	(1)
2014–2018	Venus Independeța		
Total		208+	(37+)

Managerial career
- 2018–2019: Turris Turnu Măgurele (assistant)
- * Club domestic league appearances and goals as of 19 July 2018

Csaba László Borbély (born 5 July 1980) is a Romanian former professional football player of Hungarian ethnicity who played as a forward.

== Honours ==
=== Club ===
Hutteen

- Syrian Cup: 2001

Oțelul Galați

- Liga I: 2010–11
