= Laurențiu Petean =

Romanian footballer

Laurenţiu Petean
Personal information
- Full name: Laurenţiu Petean
- Date of birth: 5 May 1988 (age 38)
- Place of birth: Galaţi, Romania
- Height: 1.78 m (5 ft 10 in)
- Position: Central midfielder

Team information
- Current team: Bahlinger SC
- Number: 18

Youth career
- 1998–2008: Oțelul Galați

Senior career*
Years	Team	Apps	(Gls)
2007–2012	Oțelul Galați	6	(0)
2008–2010	→ Delta Tulcea (loan)	30	(0)
2011	→ Petrolul Ploieşti (loan)	0	(0)
2011–2012	→ Săgeata Năvodari (loan)	10	(0)
2013–2016	Dacia Unirea Brăila	64	(2)
2017	SV Jechtingen	12	(8)
2017–	Bahlinger SC	8	(0)
- * Club domestic league appearances and goals as of 19 October 2017

Laurenţiu Petean (born 5 May 1988) is a Romanian footballer who plays for German lower leagues club Bahlinger SC. He made his debut for the first team of Oțelul Galați in July 2010.

== Honours ==
=== FC Oțelul Galați ===
- Liga I: 2010–11
