= Gabriel Paraschiv =

Romanian footballer and manager

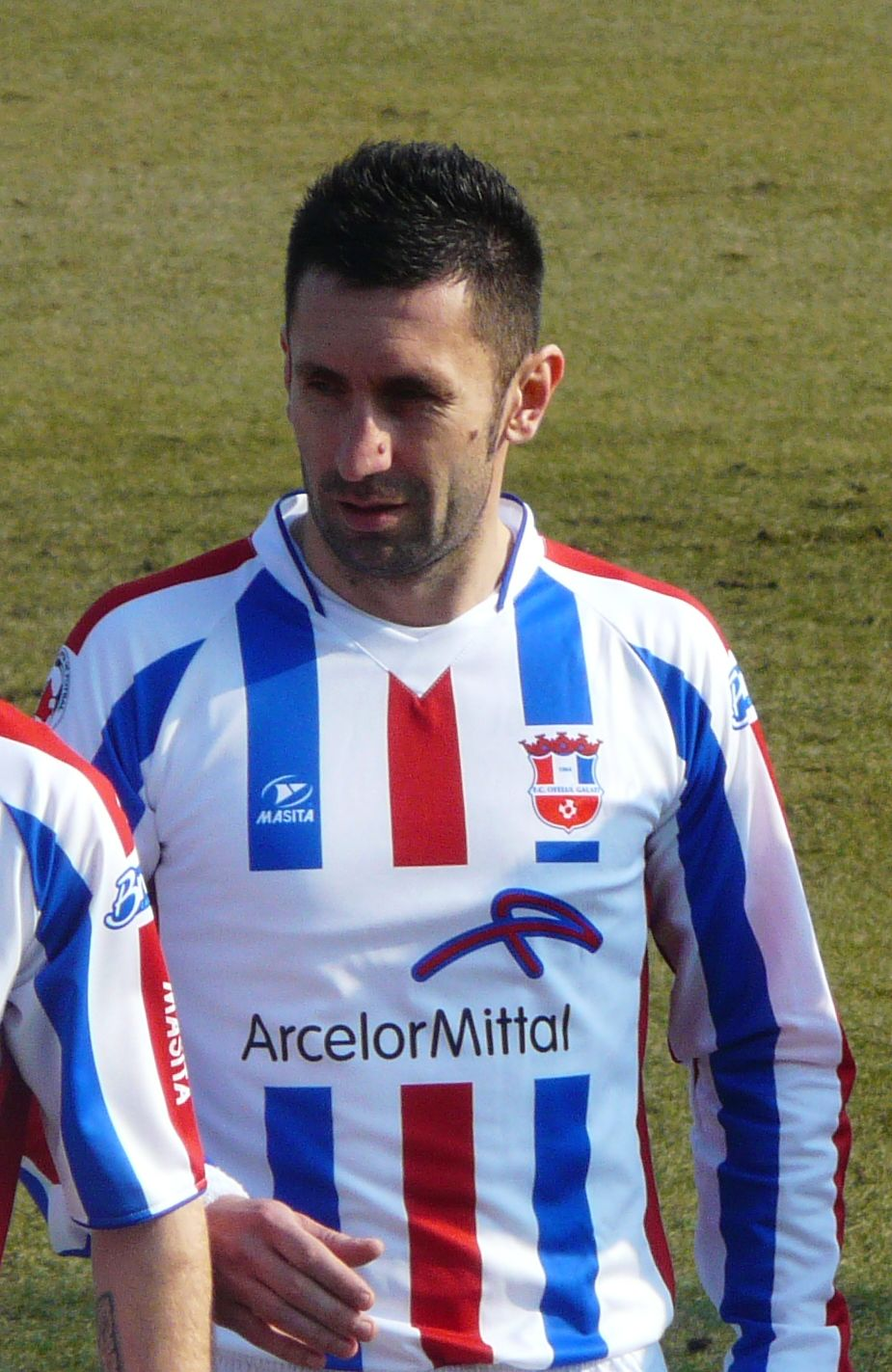

Personal information
- Full name: Gabriel Ioan Paraschiv
- Date of birth: 27 March 1978 (age 48)
- Place of birth: Moreni, Romania
- Height: 1.88 m (6 ft 2 in)
- Position: Attacking midfielder

Team information
- Current team: Flacăra Moreni (manager)

Youth career
- Flacăra Moreni

Senior career*
Years	Team	Apps	(Gls)
1998–1999	Flacăra Moreni		
1999–2001	Chindia Târgoviște	18	(2)
2001	Flacăra Moreni		
2002–2005	Petrolul Ploiești	63	(12)
2003–2004	→ Oltul Sfântu Gheorghe (loan)	5	(0)
2006–2013	Oțelul Galați	201	(38)
2017	Unirea Colibași		
2018	Flacăra Moreni		
2018–2025	Unirea Colibași		
Total		287	(52)

International career^{‡}
2008	Romania	1	(0)

Managerial career
- 2014–2025: Flacăra Moreni
- * Club domestic league appearances and goals as of 16 September 2018 ‡ National team caps and goals as of 8 March 2009

Gabriel Ioan Paraschiv (born 27 March 1978) is a Romanian former football player and manager.

== Club career ==
Paraschiv was born on 27 March 1978 in Moreni, Romania and began playing senior-level football during the 1998–99 Divizia C season at local club Flacăra. Midway through that season, he joined Divizia B club Chindia Târgoviște. At the end of the 1999–2000 season, the team suffered relegation to the third league, where he spent one more season with them. He started the 2001–02 season in Divizia C back with his hometown club, Flacăra, before transferring mid-season to the first-tier club Petrolul Ploiești. Paraschiv made his Divizia A debut under coach Costel Lazăr on 23 March 2002 in a 1–0 home loss to FCM Bacău. He scored his first goal in the competition on 25 May in a 2–1 loss to Dinamo București. Paraschiv could not avoid Petrolul's relegation at the end of the season, but he stayed with the club, helping it gain promotion back to the first league after one year. He remained in the second league for the 2003–04 campaign on a loan spell with Oltul Sfântu Gheorghe; meanwhile, Petrolul endured a separate relegation, setting the stage for his return to the club's Divizia B squad for the following two seasons.

In February 2006, Paraschiv was brought to Oțelul Galați at the request of general director Marius Stan. In his first match for his new club, a 3–0 league win over Dinamo, he scored a goal which was wrongfully disallowed by the referee. Two matches later, he scored his first legitimate goal in a 4–0 victory against FCM Bacău. On 27 August 2006, he netted a hat-trick in a 3–1 away victory against Național București. Under coach Petre Grigoraș, Paraschiv made his debut in European competitions and helped The Steelworkers win the 2007 Intertoto Cup by scoring a goal against Slavija Istočno Sarajevo and another against Trabzonspor to eliminate them. Subsequently, Oțelul qualified for the UEFA Cup second round, where they were defeated 3–1 on aggregate by Lokomotiv Sofia. Paraschiv started the 2008–09 season strongly by netting seven goals in the first four rounds, including three doubles in the first three games against Gaz Metan Mediaș, CS Otopeni and Gloria Buzău. In June 2010, he asked for a 30% reduction of his salary, claiming he had been underperforming recently and the team had some financial difficulties. In the 2010–11 season, under coach Dorinel Munteanu, Paraschiv made 25 league appearances and scored six goals, including two doubles in wins over Gaz Metan Mediaș and Universitatea Craiova, to help Oțelul win its first title. He started the following season by winning the Supercupa României, playing as a starter before Munteanu substituted him in the 64th minute with Marius Pena in Oțelul's 1–0 victory against Steaua București. Afterwards he made four appearances in the 2011–12 Champions League group stage, playing in losses to Basel, Benfica and Manchester United. He made his last Liga I appearance on 4 November 2013 in a 2–1 home victory against FC Botoșani, totaling 212 matches with 41 goals in the competition.

In the first half of the 2017–18 Liga IV season, Paraschiv scored over 20 goals for Unirea Colibași, while also working as the head coach of Flacăra Moreni. For the second half of that season, he was player-coach at Flacăra in Liga III. Subsequently, from 2018 to 2025, he played and was a prolific scorer for Unirea Colibași in Liga IV and Liga V, while continuing to work as head coach at Flacăra.

== International career ==
Paraschiv earned his sole cap for Romania as a starter on 20 August 2008, before coach Victor Pițurcă substituted him at half time with Costin Lazăr during a 1–0 friendly win against Latvia.

== Managerial career ==
Paraschiv was appointed head coach of Liga IV side Flacăra Moreni in January 2014, leading them to promotion to Liga III at the end of the 2015–16 season. His tenure lasted until the summer of 2025.

== Personal life ==
The local authorities of Galați awarded the "Galați Municipality Prize 2013" to Paraschiv for his entire sporting career.

== Career statistics ==
=== Club ===
Appearances and goals by club, season and competition
Club	Season	League			Cup		Europe		Other		Total	
Club	Season	Division	Apps	Goals	Apps	Goals	Apps	Goals	Apps	Goals	Apps	Goals
Flacăra Moreni	1998–99	Divizia C					–		–		15	3
Chindia Târgoviște	1998–99	Divizia B	14	2			–		–		14	2
Chindia Târgoviște	1999–2000	Divizia B	4	0			–		–		4	0
Chindia Târgoviște	2000–01	Divizia C					–		–			
Chindia Târgoviște	Total		18	2			–		–		18	2
Flacăra Moreni	2001–02	Divizia C					–		–			
Petrolul Ploiești	2001–02	Divizia A	11	1	0	0	–		–		11	1
Petrolul Ploiești	2002–03	Divizia B	16	1			–		–		16	1
Petrolul Ploiești	2004–05	Divizia B	22	5			–		–		22	5
Petrolul Ploiești	2005–06	Divizia B	14	5			–		–		14	5
Petrolul Ploiești	Total		63	12			–		–		63	12
Oltul Sfântu Gheorghe	2003–04	Divizia B	5	0			–		–		5	0
Oțelul Galați	2005–06	Divizia A	15	3	0	0	–		–		15	3
Oțelul Galați	2006–07	Liga I	30	7	2	1	–		–		32	8
Oțelul Galați	2007–08	Liga I	30	5	2	0	6 (Note: Four appearances with two goals scored in the UEFA Intertoto Cup and two appearances in the UEFA Cup)	2	–		38	7
Oțelul Galați	2008–09	Liga I	22	9	1	0	–		–		23	9
Oțelul Galați	2009–10	Liga I	31	5	2	0	–		–		33	5
Oțelul Galați	2010–11	Liga I	26	6	1	0	–		–		27	6
Oțelul Galați	2011–12	Liga I	23	2	2	1	4 (Note: Appearances in the UEFA Champions League)	0	1 (Note: Appearance in the Supercupa României)	0	30	0
Oțelul Galați	2012–13	Liga I	16	1	3	1	–		–		19	2
Oțelul Galați	2013–14	Liga I	8	0	0	0	–		–		8	0
Oțelul Galați	Total		201	38	13	3	10	2	1	0	225	43
Career total			287	52	13	3	10	2	1	0	311	57

=== International ===
Appearances and goals by national team and year
National team	Year	Apps	Goals
Romania
Romania	2008	1	0
Total		1	0

== Honours ==
=== Player ===
Petrolul Ploiești

- Divizia B: 2002–03

Oțelul Galați

- Liga I: 2010–11
- Supercupa României: 2011
- Intertoto Cup: 2007

=== Manager ===
Flacăra Moreni

- Liga IV: 2015–16
