= Gabriel Viglianti =

Argentinian footballer

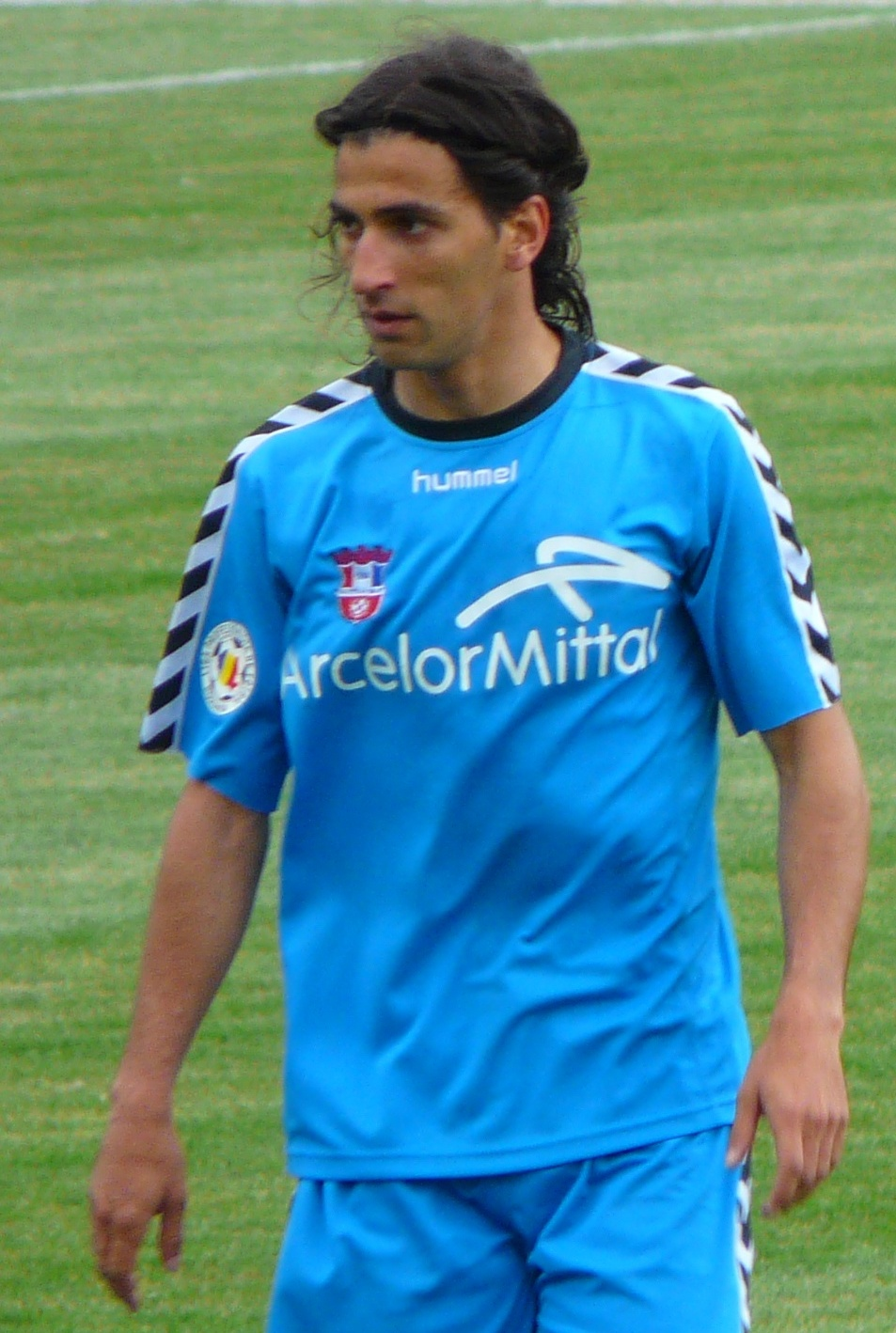

Personal information
- Full name: Gabriel Alejandro Viglianti
- Date of birth: 12 June 1979 (age 47)
- Place of birth: Córdoba, Argentina
- Height: 1.82 m (6 ft 0 in)
- Position: Attacking midfielder

Senior career*
Years	Team	Apps	(Gls)
2000–2001	Racing de Córdoba	0	(0)
2003	Agrario de Río Tercero	0	(0)
2004	Unión Tarija	34	(5)
2005–2006	San José	56	(20)
2006–2007	Bolívar	43	(10)
2008–2012	Oțelul Galați	109	(17)
Total		242	(52)
- * Club domestic league appearances and goals as of 26 September 2012

Gabriel Viglianti (born June 12, 1979) is an Argentine retired football player.

== Career ==
Viglianti was born on 12 June 1979 in Córdoba, Argentina and began playing football in 2000 at local club Racing. Subsequently, he went to Agrario de Río Tercero for a short period. Afterwards he switched countries, going to play in Bolivia, first at Unión Tarija, and then for San José where he had a prolific period and was very appreciated by the fans. His next spell was at Bolívar with whom he won the domestic league and appeared in continental competitions. Among these were six matches with one goal scored in a 2–1 away victory against Deportivo Toluca in the group stage of the 2007 Copa Libertadores.

Viglianti went from Bolívar to Romanian side Oțelul Galați which decided to transfer him after seeing his performances in Copa Libertadores and Copa Sudamericana. He made his Liga I debut on 23 February 2008 under coach Petre Grigoraș in a 0–0 draw against Unirea Urziceni. In the 2010–11 season, Viglianti was used by coach Dorinel Munteanu in 25 league games, scoring three goals, helping Oțelul win its first title. Subsequently, he started the following season by winning the Supercupa României, playing from the fourth minute, as Munteanu introduced him to replace the injured Gabriel Giurgiu in The Steelworkers's 1–0 victory against Steaua București. Afterwards he made four appearances in the 2011–12 Champions League group stage, playing in losses to Basel, Benfica and Manchester United. Viglianti ended his career in 2012, making his last Liga I appearance for Oțelul on 8 December in a 3–2 away victory against Rapid București, having a total of 109 games with 17 goals in the competition.

== Honours ==
Bolívar

- Bolivian First Division: 2006 Clausura

Oțelul Galați

- Liga I: 2010–11
- Supercupa României: 2011
