= Ivan Vukadinović =

Serbian footballer

Personal information
- Full name: Ivan Vukadinović
- Date of birth: 21 August 1984 (age 42)
- Place of birth: Belgrade, SFR Yugoslavia
- Height: 1.89 m (6 ft 2 in)
- Position: Left back

Senior career*
Years	Team	Apps	(Gls)
2002–2004	OFK Beograd	1	(0)
2003–2004	→ BASK (loan)	14	(1)
2004–2006	BASK	17	(0)
2005–2006	→ Grafičar Beograd (loan)	16	(1)
2006–2009	Voždovac	60	(1)
2009–2011	BSK Borča	30	(1)
2011–2012	Gaz Metan Mediaș	30	(0)
2015	Železnik		
2015–2017	Radnički Beograd		
2017–2018	BSK 1926 Baćevac		
Total		168	(4)
- * Club domestic league appearances and goals

Ivan Vukadinović (Serbian Cyrillic: Иван Вукадиновић; born 21 August 1984) is a Serbian retired footballer who played as a defender.
