= Liviu Antal =

Romanian footballer

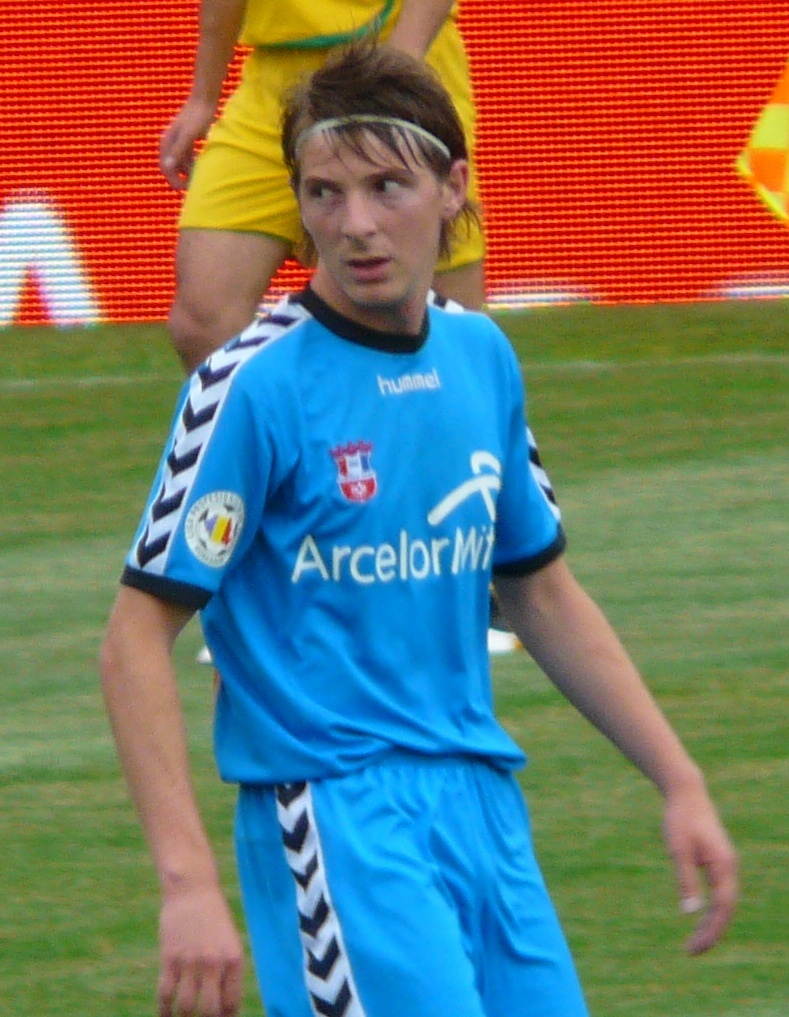
- Antal in 2010

Personal information
- Full name: Liviu Ion Antal
- Date of birth: 2 June 1989 (age 37)
- Place of birth: Șimleu Silvaniei, Romania
- Height: 1.77 m (5 ft 10 in)
- Position: Winger

Team information
- Current team: Žalgiris
- Number: 8

Youth career
- 2000–2007: LPS Bihorul Oradea

Senior career*
Years	Team	Apps	(Gls)
2007–2008	Concordia Chiajna	21	(2)
2008–2009	FCM Târgu Mureș	26	(6)
2009–2012	Oțelul Galați	83	(16)
2012–2014	Vaslui	63	(21)
2014–2015	Gençlerbirliği	9	(1)
2015	→ Beitar Jerusalem (loan)	14	(3)
2015–2017	Hapoel Tel Aviv	16	(2)
2016	→ Pandurii Târgu Jiu (loan)	24	(5)
2017	CFR Cluj	7	(0)
2017–2020	Žalgiris	85	(48)
2021–2022	UTA Arad	41	(5)
2022	Haladás	0	(0)
2022	→ Zalaegerszeg (loan)	0	(0)
2022–2023	Mioveni	30	(2)
2023–2025	Žalgiris	40	(24)
2025	SCM Zalău	11	(7)
2025	→ Žalgiris (loan)	20	(13)
2026–	Žalgiris	26	(6)

International career
2009–2010	Romania U21	2	(0)
2011	Romania	1	(0)
- * Club domestic league appearances and goals as of 18 October 2026

Liviu Ion Antal (born 2 June 1989) is a Romanian professional footballer who plays as a winger for TOPLYGA club Žalgiris.

He was the top goalscorer of the 2013–14 Liga I, as he netted fifteen times for Vaslui which was relegated at the end of the season due to financial issues. After moving abroad and having brief spells in Turkey and Israel, he repeated the performance with Lithuanian side Žalgiris in 2018.

== Club career ==
=== Oțelul Galați ===
Antal was a very important player for Oțelul Galați helping the team win their first title in the 2010–11 season. He then played in the 2011–12 UEFA Champions League season against Manchester United, S.L. Benfica and FC Basel.

=== Vaslui ===
On 14 June 2012, Antal signed a four-year deal with FC Vaslui. He scored his first goal for FC Vaslui on 1 August 2012 in a 1–1 draw against Fenerbahçe in the UEFA Champions League third qualifying round.

=== Gençlerbirliği ===
In July 2014, Antal started his first experience abroad. After FC Vaslui declared bankruptcy, Antal became a free agent and signed a contract with the Turkish side Gençlerbirliği. He made his debut for the club coming on as a 67' substitute on 13 September 2014. He scored his first goal for the club on 25 October 2014 against Fenerbahçe.

=== Beitar Jerusalem ===
On 1 February 2015, Antal signed a one-year deal with Beitar Jerusalem. He made his debut for the club that same week in an away game at Hapoel Haifa, scoring Beitar's second goal from a penalty as Beitar went on to win 4–3.

=== Žalgiris Vilnius ===
Antal signed for Vilnius-based club on 20 June 2017. He agreed to 1.5-year deal with Lithuanian champions.

== International career ==
Antal made his debut for the Romania national team at the age of 22 in 2011 in a friendly game against Paraguay.

== Career statistics ==
As of match played 18 October 2026

Appearances and goals by club, season and competition
Club	Season	League			National cup (Note: Includes Cupa României, Turkish Cup, Israel State Cup, Lithuanian Football Cup)		Europe		Other		Total	
Club	Season	Division	Apps	Goals	Apps	Goals	Apps	Goals	Apps	Goals	Apps	Goals
Concordia Chiajna	2007–08	Liga II	21	2	2	0	–		–		23	2
FCM Târgu Mureş	2008–09	Liga II	26	6	3	0	–		–		29	6
Oțelul Galați	2009–10	Liga I	25	5	1	0	—		—		26	5
Oțelul Galați	2010–11	Liga I	28	7	1	0	—		—		29	7
Oțelul Galați	2011–12	Liga I	30	4	3	2	6 (Note: Appearance(s) in UEFA Champions League)	1	1 (Note: Appearance in Supercupa României)	0	40	7
Oțelul Galați	Total		83	16	5	2	6	1	1	0	95	19
Vaslui	2012–13	Liga I	31	5	1	0	4 (Note: Two appearances and one goal in UEFA Champions League, two appearances in UEFA Europa League)	1	—		36	6
Vaslui	2013–14	Liga I	32	16	2	1	—		—		34	17
Vaslui	Total		63	21	3	1	4	1	–		70	23
Gençlerbirliği	2014–15	Süper Lig	9	1	5	3	—		—		14	4
Beitar Jerusalem (loan)	2014–15	Israeli Premier League	14	3	–		–		–		14	3
Hapoel Tel Aviv	2015–16	Israeli Premier League	16	2	1	0	—		—		17	2
Pandurii Târgu Jiu (loan)	2015–16	Liga I	11	3	—		–		—		11	3
Pandurii Târgu Jiu (loan)	2016–17	Liga I	13	2	—		—		—		13	2
Pandurii Târgu Jiu (loan)	Total		24	5	—		—		—		24	5
CFR Cluj	2016–17	Liga I	7	0	0	0	—		—		7	0
Žalgiris	2017	A Lyga	12	4	3	1	1	0	—		16	5
Žalgiris	2018	A Lyga	28	23	4	4	6 (Note: Appearances in UEFA Europa League)	3	—		38	30
Žalgiris	2019	A Lyga	28	15	2	3	2	1	1 (Note: Appearance in Lithuanian Supercup)	0	33	19
Žalgiris	2020	A Lyga	17	6	3	0	2	2	1	0	23	8
Žalgiris	Total		85	48	12	8	11	6	2	0	110	62
UTA Arad	2020–21	Liga I	21	3	1	0	—		—		22	3
UTA Arad	2021–22	Liga I	20	2	1	0	—		—		21	2
UTA Arad	Total		41	5	2	0	—		—		43	5
Zalaegerszeg (loan)	2021–22	Nemzeti Bajnokság I	0	0	—		—		—		0	0
Mioveni	2022–23	Liga I	30	2	2	0	—		—		32	2
Žalgiris	2023	A Lyga	5	4	0	0	6 (Note: Three appearances in UEFA Champions League, two appearances in UEFA Europa League, one appearance in UEFA Europa Conference League)	0	—		11	4
Žalgiris	2024	A Lyga	35	20	1	0	4 (Note: Appearances in UEFA Conference League)	2	—		40	22
Žalgiris	Total		40	24	1	0	10	2	0	0	51	26
SCM Zalău	2024–25	Liga III	11	7	—		—		—		11	7
Žalgiris (loan)	2025	A Lyga	20	13	—		4 (Note: Two appearances and one goal in UEFA Champions League, two appearances in UEFA Conference League)	1	–		24	14
Žalgiris	2026	TOPLYGA	26	6	1	1	2	0	—		29	7
Žalgiris	Total		46	19	1	1	6	1	—		53	21
Career total			517	161	37	15	37	11	3	0	596	187

== Honours ==
Oțelul Galați

- Liga I: 2010–11
- Supercupa României: 2011

Žalgiris

- A Lyga: 2020, 2024
- Lithuanian Cup: 2018
- Lithuanian Supercup: 2020

Individual

- Liga I top scorer: 2013–14 (16 goals)
- DigiSport Liga I Player of the Month: October 2015
- A Lyga top scorer: 2018 (23 goals), 2024 (20 goals)
- A Lyga Team of the Year: 2018
- A Lyga Player of the Month: May 2018, August 2018
