= John Ibeh =

Nigerian footballer

Personal information
- Full name: Ikechukwu John Kingsley Ibeh
- Date of birth: 16 April 1986 (age 40)
- Place of birth: Port Harcourt, Nigeria
- Height: 1.87 m (6 ft 2 in)
- Position: Left midfielder

Youth career
- 2001–2003: AFC
- 2003–2005: Hapoel Tel Aviv

Senior career*
Years	Team	Apps	(Gls)
2005–2007	DWS	15	(10)
2007–2008	UTA Arad	22	(9)
2009–2011	Oțelul Galați	56	(6)
2012–2013	Pandurii Târgu Jiu	29	(10)
2013	Aris	8	(0)
2017	Oțelul Galați	5	(2)
Total		135	(37)
- * Club domestic league appearances and goals as of 22 January 2018

John Ike Ibeh (born 16 April 1986) is a Nigerian footballer who plays as a left midfielder. He played for several seasons in the Romanian Liga I.

== Career ==
Ibeh was born on 16 April 1986 in Port Harcourt, Nigeria. In 2001 he went to play junior-level football in Netherlands for AFC. In 2003 he moved to Israel at Hapoel Tel Aviv. He started his senior career in 2005, at DWS in the Dutch lower leagues.

In the middle of the 2007–08 season, Ibeh joined Romanian side UTA Arad, making his Liga I debut on 19 April 2008 under coach Roland Nagy in a 3–0 home loss to CFR Cluj, and his performance was highly regarded by the Gazeta Sporturilor newspaper. He scored his first goal on 2 May in a 3–2 away victory against Rapid București. However, the team was relegated at the end of the season, but Ibeh stayed with the club for the first half of the 2008–09 Liga II season.

Afterwards he left UTA due to unpaid salaries and signed with Oțelul Galați. In the 2010–11 season, Ibeh played nine league games under coach Dorinel Munteanu, scoring once in a 3–0 away win over Unirea Urziceni, as Oțelul won its first title. He started the following season by winning the Supercupa României, being used the entire match by Munteanu in The Steelworkers's 1–0 victory against Steaua București. Subsequently, he made two appearances in the 2011–12 Champions League group stage, playing in losses to Basel and Benfica.

In February 2012, Ibeh moved to Pandurii Târgu Jiu. He netted a personal record of eight goals for Pandurii in the 2012–13 season, starting with a double in a 6–2 victory against Universitatea Cluj, as the team finished runner-up in the league. On 29 May 2013, Ibeh made his last Liga I appearance in Pandurii's 1–1 draw against Astra Giurgiu, having a total 90 matches with 17 goals in the competition.

In 2013 he switched countries, going to Aris in Greece. He made his Super League Greece debut on 18 August 2013 under coach Giannis Chatzinikolaou in a 2–1 away loss to Apollon Smyrnis. In 2017, Ibeh made a comeback at Oțelul Galați in Liga III.

== Personal life ==
Ibeh was a fan of hip-hop music, appreciating 50 Cent very much. His favorite footballer was Zinedine Zidane.

== Honours ==
Oțelul Galați

- Liga I: 2010–11
- Supercupa României: 2011

Pandurii Târgu Jiu

- Liga I: runner-up 2012–13
