= Marko Čampar =

Serbian footballer

Personal information
- Full name: Marko Čampar
- Date of birth: 16 August 1987 (age 39)
- Place of birth: Kraljevo, SFR Yugoslavia
- Height: 1.94 m (6 ft 4 in)
- Position: Goalkeeper

Team information
- Current team: Proleter Pecenog

Youth career
- Rad

Senior career*
Years	Team	Apps	(Gls)
2005–2006	Sinđelić Beograd		
2007	Sloga Kraljevo		
2008	Omladinac Novo Selo		
2008–2009	Sloboda Užice		
2009–2010	Radnički Sombor	8	(0)
2010	Prva Petoletka		
2011	Oțelul Galați		
2011	Petrolul Ploiești	0	(0)
2012	Prahova Tomsani		
2012–2013	Brazi		
2013	Kaposvár Rákóczi	0	(0)
2013	Kaposvár Rákóczi II	5	(0)
2013–2014	Ozren Sokobanja		
2015	Sloga Despotovac		
2016	Sloga Kraljevo	0	(0)
2016–2017	Real Podunavci		
2017	Radnik Ušće		
2018-2019	Proleter Pecenog		
2019-2021	Karađorđe Ribnica		
2021-	Proleter Pecenog		
- * Club domestic league appearances and goals as of 28 July 2017

Marko Čampar (Serbian Cyrillic: Марко Чампар; born 16 August 1987) is a Serbian football goalkeeper, playing for Proleter Pecenog.

== Club career ==
Born in Kraljevo, Čampar was with youth categories of FK Rad, and later joined Sinđelić Beograd, where he spent a period between 2005 and 2006. He was also with Sloga Kraljevo, Omladinac Novo Selo and Sloboda Užice until he joined Radnički Sombor for the 2009–10 season. Playing with that club, Čampar made 8 Serbian First League appearances. He was on the field in matches against Teleoptik, Mladost Lučani, Srem, Srem, Zemun, Novi Pazar, Proleter Novi Sad, Bežanija, and Sloboda Užice. After a half-season he spent with Prva Petoletka, Čampar moved to Romania, where he played with several clubs, including Oțelul Galați, Petrolul Ploiești, Prahova Tomsani and Brazi. He was also with Hungarian side Kaposvári Rákóczi in 2013. After that, he returned in Serbia and joined Ozren Sokobanja, where he was until the end of 2014. During the 2015, he was with Sloga Despotovac. At the beginning of 2016, Čampar returned in his home town and joined Sloga Kraljevo for the second time in his senior career, but spent mostly time as a reserve option and left the club in summer same year. Although he was related with Morava Zone League side Karađorđe Ribnica, Čampar joined Real Podunavci for the 2016–17 season. In summer 2017, Čampar moved to Radnik Ušće.
