= Cristian Sîrghi =

Romanian footballer

Personal information
- Date of birth: 23 November 1986 (age 39)
- Place of birth: Galați, Romania
- Height: 1.84 m (6 ft 0 in)
- Positions: Centre-back; defensive midfielder

Team information
- Current team: Oțelul Galați (sporting director)

Youth career
- –2006: Oțelul Galați

Senior career*
Years	Team	Apps	(Gls)
2006	Politehnica Galați		
2007–2014	Oțelul Galați	150	(8)
2014–2015	Maccabi Netanya	19	(2)
2015–2016	Concordia Chiajna	14	(0)
2016–2017	Ermis Aradippou	25	(1)
2017	Pandurii Târgu Jiu	1	(0)
2017–2018	Gaz Metan Mediaș	25	(0)
2018	Flamurtari	3	(0)
2019	Dunărea Călărași	4	(0)
2019–2020	Petrolul Ploiești	18	(0)
2020–2023	Oțelul Galați	33	(1)
Total		292	(12)

International career
2007	Romania U21	3	(1)

Managerial career
- 2023–2024: Oțelul Galați (delegate)
- 2024–: Oțelul Galați (sporting director)
- * Club domestic league appearances and goals

Cristian Sîrghi (born 23 November 1986) is a Romanian former professional footballer who played as a centre-back, currently sporting director at Liga I club Oțelul Galați.

== Honours ==
Oțelul Galați

- Liga I: 2010–11
- Supercupa României: 2011
- Liga III: 2020–21, 2021–22
