= 2010–11 Liga I =

93rd season of top-tier football league in Romania

Liga I
- Season: 2010–11
- Champions: Oțelul Galați
- Relegated: Timișoara; Gloria Bistrița; FC U Craiova; Unirea Urziceni; Victoria Brănești
- Champions League: Oțelul Galați; Vaslui
- Europa League: Rapid București; Steaua București; Dinamo București; Gaz Metan Mediaș
- Matches: 305
- Goals: 756 (2.48 per match)
- Top goalscorer: Ianis Zicu (18)
- Biggest home win: Rapid 7–1 Victoria
- Biggest away win: Târgu Mureș 2–6 Dinamo
- Highest scoring: Dinamo 5–3 Sportul; Târgu Mureș 2–6 Dinamo; Rapid 7–1 Victoria; Vaslui 5–3 CFR

The 2010–11 Liga I was the ninety-third season of the top-level football league of Romania. The season commenced on 23 July 2010 and ended on 21 May 2011. A winter break where no matches were played was held between 11 December 2010 and 18 February 2011. A total of eighteen teams participated in the league, where CFR Cluj were the defending champions.

== Teams ==
Politehnica Iași, Ceahlăul Piatra Neamț and Unirea Alba Iulia were relegated to Liga II after finishing the 2009–10 season in the bottom three places. Ceahlăul Piatra Neamț and Unirea Alba Iulia made their immediate return to the second level, while Politehnica Iași ended a six-year tenure in the highest football league of Romania. 15th-placed team Pandurii Târgu Jiu, who originally were to be relegated as well, were allowed to remain in Liga I after Internațional Curtea de Argeș withdrew from the league because of financial reasons. Internațional thus returned to Liga II after having been promoted the previous season.

The four relegated teams were replaced by the champions and runners-up from both 2009–10 Liga II divisions. Victoria Brănești and Sportul Studențesc were promoted from Seria I while Târgu Mureș and Universitatea Cluj were promoted from Seria II, with Victoria Brănești and Universitatea Cluj being constrained to play their home games on grounds in other cities (than home based) as their did not meet Liga I requirements.

=== Venues ===
FC Timișoara	Steaua București	FC U Craiova	CFR Cluj
Dan Păltinișanu	Steaua	Ion Oblemenco	Dr. Constantin Rădulescu
Capacity: 32,972	Capacity: 28,365	Capacity: 25,252	Capacity: 23,500
Pandurii Târgu Jiu (Note: Pandurii Târgu Jiu was relocated to Municipal Stadium from Drobeta-Turnu Severin from the 11th round because Tudor Vladimirescu Stadium from Târgu Jiu was under renovation.)	Victoria Brănești (Note: Victoria Brănești was relocated to Municipal Stadium from Buzău until the 23rd round and then to Concordia Stadium from Chiajna because Cătălin Hîldan Stadium from Brănești does not meet the standards for Liga I.)	Dinamo București	Oțelul Galați
Municipal	Municipal	Dinamo	Oțelul
Capacity: 20,054	Capacity: 18,000	Capacity: 15,032	Capacity: 13,500
Rapid București	2010–11 Liga I (Romania) Location of Bucharest teams.		Sportul Studențesc
Giulești-Valentin Stănescu	2010–11 Liga I (Romania) Location of Bucharest teams.		Regie
Capacity: 11,704 (Note: Capacity of Giulești-Valentin Stănescu Stadium has been reduced from 19,100 to 11,704 due to advanced degradation of the resistance structure of the South End.)	2010–11 Liga I (Romania) Location of Bucharest teams.		Capacity: 10,020
FC Vaslui	2010–11 Liga I (Romania) Location of Bucharest teams.		Astra Ploiești
Municipal	2010–11 Liga I (Romania) Location of Bucharest teams.		Astra
Capacity: 9,240	2010–11 Liga I (Romania) Location of Bucharest teams.		Capacity: 9,000
FC Brașov	2010–11 Liga I (Romania) Location of Bucharest teams.		Târgu Mureș
Silviu Ploeșteanu	2010–11 Liga I (Romania) Location of Bucharest teams.		Trans-Sil
Capacity: 8,800	2010–11 Liga I (Romania) Location of Bucharest teams.		Capacity: 8,200
Universitatea Cluj (Note: Universitatea Cluj was relocated to Cetate Stadium from Alba Iulia until the 19th round because Cluj Arena was under construction and then was relocated to Gaz Metan Stadium from Mediaș.)	Gaz Metan Mediaș (Note: Gaz Metan Mediaș was relocated to Municipal Stadium from Sibiu until the 10th round because Gaz Metan Stadium from Mediaș was under renovation.)	Gloria Bistrița	Unirea Urziceni
Cetate	Gaz Metan	Gloria	Tineretului
Capacity: 8,000 (Note: Capacity of Cetate Stadium has been reduced from 18,000 to 8,000 due to security reasons.)	Capacity: 7,814	Capacity: 7,800	Capacity: 7,000

=== Personnel and kits ===
Team	Head coach	Captain	Kit manufacturer	Shirt Sponsor
Astra Ploiești	(Romania) Tibor Selymes	(Japan) Takayuki Seto	Adidas	InterAgro
Brașov	(Portugal) António Conceição	(Romania) Robert Ilyeș	Puma	Roman
CFR Cluj	(Romania) Alin Minteuan	(Portugal) Cadú	Joma	EnergoBit
Dinamo București	(Romania) Ioan Andone	(Romania) Ionel Dănciulescu	Nike	Orange
FC U Craiova	(Romania) Silviu Lung	(Romania) Andrei Prepeliță	Adidas	Ediție Specială
Gaz Metan Mediaș	(Romania) Cristian Pustai	(Romania) Cristian Todea	Joma	RomGaz
Gloria Bistrița	(Romania) Nicolae Manea	(Romania) Călin Albuț	Puma	Teraplast
Oțelul Galați	(Romania) Dorinel Munteanu	(Romania) Sergiu Costin	Masita	ArcelorMittal
Pandurii Târgu Jiu	(Romania) Petre Grigoraș	(Romania) Mihai Pintilii	Umbro	USMO
Rapid București	(Romania) Marian Rada	(Brazil) Marcos António	Puma	SuperBet
Sportul Studențesc	(Romania) Gheorghe Mulțescu	(Romania) Costin Curelea	Puma	Omniasig
Steaua București	(Romania) Sorin Cârțu	(Romania) Ciprian Tătărușanu	Nike	—
Târgu Mureș	(Romania) Ioan Ovidiu Sabău	(Romania) Florin Dan	Joma	Primăria Târgu Mureș
Timișoara	(Czech Republic) Dušan Uhrin, Jr.	(Romania) Dan Alexa	Lotto	Balkan Petroleum
Unirea Urziceni	(Romania) Marian Pană	(Romania) Epaminonda Nicu	Givova	GreenCity
Universitatea Cluj	(Romania) Ionuț Badea	(Romania) Gabriel Boștină	Nike	Romprest
Vaslui	(Romania) Viorel Hizo	(Romania) Gabriel Cânu	Adidas	New Holland Agriculture
Victoria Brănești	(Romania) Ciprian Urican	(Romania) Sergiu Bar	Nike	—

=== Managerial changes ===
Team	Outgoing manager	Manner of departure	Date of vacancy	Incoming manager	Date of appointment
Steaua București	(Romania) Victor Pițurcă	Resigned	9 August 2010	(Romania) Ilie Dumitrescu	12 August 2010
Unirea Urziceni	(Israel) Ronny Levy	Resigned	21 August 2010	(Romania) Octavian Grigore	12 September 2010
FC U Craiova	(Romania) Aurel Țicleanu	Sacked	22 August 2010	(Romania) Victor Pițurcă	26 August 2010
Astra Ploiești	(Romania) Mihai Stoichiță	Sacked	31 August 2010	(Romania) Tibor Selymes	6 September 2010
Târgu Mureș	(Romania) Adrian Falub	Mutual Termination	31 August 2010	(Romania) Ioan Ovidiu Sabău	3 September 2010
Sportul Studențesc	(Romania) Tibor Selymes	Signed by Astra Ploiești	6 September 2010	(Romania) Viorel Moldovan	9 September 2010
CFR Cluj	(Italy) Andrea Mandorlini	Sacked	12 September 2010	(Romania) Sorin Cârțu	13 September 2010
Timișoara	(Serbia) Vladimir Petrović	Signed by Serbia	15 September 2010	(Romania) Cosmin Contra	15 September 2010
Steaua București	(Romania) Ilie Dumitrescu	Resigned	21 September 2010	(Romania) Marius Lăcătuș	28 September 2010
Pandurii Târgu Jiu	(Romania) Ionuț Badea	Sacked	2 October 2010	(Romania) Petre Grigoraș	2 October 2010
Vaslui	(Spain) Juan Ramón López Caro	Sacked	8 October 2010	(Romania) Viorel Hizo	8 October 2010
Gloria Bistrița	(Romania) Laurențiu Reghecampf	Sacked	22 October 2010	(Romania) Nicolae Manea	23 October 2010
Sportul Studențesc	(Romania) Viorel Moldovan	Resigned	31 October 2010	(Romania) Florin Tene	1 November 2010
Universitatea Cluj	(Romania) Marian Pană	Resigned	8 November 2010	(Romania) Ionuț Badea	25 November 2010
CFR Cluj	(Romania) Sorin Cârțu	Sacked	24 November 2010	(Romania) Alin Minteuan	24 November 2010
Timișoara	(Romania) Cosmin Contra	Sacked	4 December 2010	(Czech Republic) Dušan Uhrin, Jr.	13 December 2010
Brașov	(Romania) Daniel Isăilă	Made Assistant Manager	18 December 2010	(Portugal) António Conceição	18 December 2010
Unirea Urziceni	(Romania) Octavian Grigore	Resigned	10 January 2011	(Romania) Marian Pană	26 February 2011
FC U Craiova	(Romania) Victor Pițurcă	Sacked	13 January 2011	(Italy) Nicolò Napoli	15 January 2011
Steaua București	(Romania) Marius Lăcătuș	Resigned	7 March 2011	(Romania) Sorin Cârțu	8 March 2011
Sportul Studențesc	(Romania) Florin Tene	Resigned	13 March 2011	(Romania) Gheorghe Mulțescu	15 March 2011
FC U Craiova	(Italy) Nicolò Napoli	Promoted Director of football	7 April 2011	(Romania) Laurențiu Reghecampf	8 April 2011
Victoria Brănești	(Romania) Ilie Stan	Resigned	19 April 2011	(Romania) Ciprian Urican	20 April 2011
Rapid București	(Romania) Marius Șumudică	Sacked	27 April 2011	(Romania) Marian Rada (interim)	28 May 2011
FC U Craiova	(Romania) Laurențiu Reghecampf	Sacked	2 May 2011	(Romania) Aurel Țicleanu	2 May 2011
Steaua București	(Romania) Sorin Cârțu	Resigned	4 May 2011	(Romania) Gabriel Caramarin (interim)	5 May 2011
FC U Craiova	(Romania) Aurel Țicleanu	Resigned	7 May 2011	(Romania) Sandu Tăbârcă (interim)	8 May 2011

== League table ==
Pos	Team	Pld	W	D	L	GF	GA	GD	Pts	Qualification or relegation
1	Oțelul Galați (C)	34	21	7	6	46	25	+21	70	Qualification to Champions League group stage
2	Politehnica Timișoara (R)	34	17	15	2	63	38	+25	66	Relegation to Liga II (Note: Timișoara and Gloria Bistrița were denied a licence for the 2011–12 season because of accumulated debt and were therefore relegated to Liga II. Sportul Studențesc as the only team from the relegated sides holding a Liga I licence were hence spared from relegation.)
3	Vaslui	34	18	11	5	51	28	+23	65	Qualification to Champions League third qualifying round
4	Rapid București	34	16	11	7	43	22	+21	59	Qualification to Europa League play-off round
5	Steaua București	34	16	9	9	44	27	+17	57	Qualification to Europa League play-off round (Note: Steaua București won the 2010–11 Cupa României competition and therefore qualified for the play-off round of the 2011–12 UEFA Europa League.)
6	Dinamo București	34	16	8	10	68	52	+16	56	Qualification to Europa League third qualifying round
7	Gaz Metan Mediaș	34	14	13	7	41	32	+9	55	Qualification to Europa League second qualifying round
8	Universitatea Cluj	34	13	8	13	48	54	−6	47	
9	Târgu Mureș	34	12	9	13	34	41	−7	45 (Note: TMU: 8 pts, 3–1; CFR: 3 pts, 4–5; AST: 3 pts, 3–4)	
10	CFR Cluj	34	11	12	11	50	45	+5	45	
11	Astra Ploiești	34	10	15	9	36	30	+6	45	
12	Brașov	34	10	13	11	34	40	−6	43	
13	Pandurii Târgu Jiu	34	9	10	15	36	46	−10	37	
14	Gloria Bistrița (R)	34	8	11	15	34	49	−15	35	Relegation to Liga II
15	FC U Craiova (R)	34	7	9	18	35	48	−13	30	Relegation to Liga II
16	Victoria Brănești (R)	34	5	10	19	35	61	−26	25 (Note: VIC 4–1 UUR; UUR 2–1 VIC)	Relegation to Liga II
17	Unirea Urziceni (R)	34	6	7	21	23	63	−40	25	Relegation to Liga II
18	Sportul Studențesc București	34	7	2	25	38	58	−20	23	Spared from relegation

Source: LPF (in Romanian)
Rules for classification: 1st points; 2nd head-to-head points; 3rd head-to-head goal difference; 4th head-to-head goals scored; 5th overall goal difference; 6th overall goals scored
(C) Champions; (R) Relegated

=== Positions by round ===
Team ╲ Round	1	2	3	4	5	6	7	8	9	10	11	12	13	14	15	16	17	18	19	20	21	22	23	24	25	26	27	28	29	30	31	32	33	34
Oțelul Galați	5	3	4	3	4	3	5	1	1	1	1	1	1	1	1	1	1	1	1	1	1	1	1	1	1	2	1	1	2	2	1	1	1	1
Politehnica Timișoara	7	8	7	6	5	6	7	6	3	2	2	3	3	2	2	2	2	2	2	2	2	2	2	2	2	1	2	2	1	1	2	2	2	2
Vaslui	18	14	14	10	12	14	11	8	7	6	6	5	4	4	5	4	3	3	3	3	3	3	3	3	3	3	3	3	3	3	3	3	3	3
Rapid București	1	5	6	9	6	5	2	2	2	3	3	2	2	3	3	3	4	4	4	4	5	7	4	4	4	6	5	5	6	6	4	4	4	4
Steaua București	3	4	5	4	2	1	3	3	5	4	5	4	6	6	8	7	7	7	6	6	4	6	6	6	5	5	4	6	5	5	6	6	6	5
Dinamo București	3	1	1	2	1	2	1	4	6	7	7	6	5	5	6	5	6	6	5	5	6	4	5	5	6	4	6	4	4	4	5	5	5	6
Gaz Metan Mediaș	2	7	2	1	3	4	6	5	4	5	4	7	8	7	4	6	5	5	7	7	7	5	7	7	7	7	7	7	7	7	7	7	7	7
Universitatea Cluj	14	17	17	12	8	7	4	7	8	8	10	10	9	10	10	11	11	14	11	14	13	13	13	11	11	10	10	10	11	10	10	10	11	8
Târgu Mureș	16	12	9	11	13	17	14	10	12	14	15	15	11	13	11	12	14	13	14	12	10	12	11	10	10	12	11	11	10	9	9	9	10	9
CFR Cluj	9	5	8	8	11	10	12	14	15	11	11	9	10	9	7	8	8	8	8	8	8	8	8	8	9	9	9	8	8	8	8	8	8	10
Astra Ploiești	14	11	18	17	15	15	17	17	14	12	12	11	13	11	12	10	10	9	9	9	9	9	9	9	8	8	8	9	9	11	11	11	9	11
Brașov	5	2	3	5	7	9	8	9	10	13	14	14	14	16	14	16	13	12	10	10	11	11	10	12	13	13	13	12	12	12	12	12	12	12
Pandurii Târgu Jiu	9	15	14	18	17	18	16	18	18	18	17	17	17	15	15	13	16	16	16	16	16	16	14	14	14	14	12	13	13	13	13	13	13	13
Gloria Bistrița	7	9	13	7	10	8	10	11	13	15	16	16	12	14	17	15	12	11	12	11	12	10	12	13	12	11	14	14	14	14	14	14	14	14
FC U Craiova	9	12	16	15	14	11	15	16	11	9	8	8	7	8	9	9	9	10	13	13	14	14	15	15	15	15	15	15	15	15	15	15	15	15
Victoria Brănești	13	17	11	13	16	16	18	13	16	16	13	13	16	12	13	14	15	15	15	15	15	15	16	16	16	16	16	16	16	16	17	17	17	16
Unirea Urziceni	9	10	12	16	18	12	9	12	9	10	10	12	15	17	16	17	17	17	17	17	17	17	17	17	17	17	17	17	17	17	16	16	16	17
Sportul Studențesc București	16	16	10	14	9	13	13	15	17	17	18	18	18	18	18	18	18	18	18	18	18	18	18	18	18	18	18	18	18	18	18	18	18	18

Leaders; Liga I
2nd place; Liga I
3rd place; Liga I

Source: kicker.de (in German)

== Results ==
Home \ Away	AST	BRA	CFR	DIN	GAZ	GBI	OȚE	PAN	RAP	SPO	STE	TGM	TIM	UUR	UCL	UCR	VAS	VIC
Astra Ploiești		3–0	1–1	1–2	0–2	1–0	0–1	2–0	0–0	1–0	1–0	0–0	1–1	1–0	1–2	2–2	1–1	2–0
Brașov	0–3		2–2	2–2	0–0	0–1	1–0	3–2	2–0	2–0	1–1	1–1	0–0	1–1	3–1	0–3	1–1	1–0
CFR Cluj	2–2	4–0		1–0	1–1	2–2	0–1	2–1	0–1	2–0	1–3	1–2	1–2	3–0	1–1	2–1	1–0	2–0
Dinamo București	2–2	2–1	1–2		3–2	3–0	1–2	2–2	3–2	5–3	2–1	4–1	0–0	3–1	3–4	2–2	1–2	3–1
Gaz Metan Mediaș	0–0	0–0	3–2	2–1		2–1	0–2	2–0	0–1	3–0	0–0	0–0	2–2	2–0	3–1	1–0	0–0	2–2
Gloria Bistrița	1–1	0–0	0–3	0–2	0–0		0–0	3–0	3–2	1–0	1–0	3–1	3–3	0–0	2–4	1–1	1–1	1–0
Oțelul Galați	2–1	1–0	1–1	3–3	2–2	2–1		2–0	1–0	1–0	1–0	1–0	2–1	4–1	3–0	2–1	0–0	1–1
Pandurii Târgu Jiu	1–0	2–1	2–1	2–2	0–0	0–0	0–3 (Note: This match was awarded to Oțelul 0–3 because of debts not paid in time by Pandurii.)		0–1	1–0	1–1	4–1	0–1	0–0	2–0	3–1	0–1	4–2
Rapid București	3–0	1–0	2–0	0–0	2–1	2–0	0–0	1–1		0–1	0–0	1–1	3–2	1–0	3–0	0–0	2–0	7–1
Sportul Studențesc București	0–1	1–2	3–0	0–1	0–1	4–2	0–1	2–1	0–2		1–2	1–2	2–3	5–1	2–0	3–0	0–1	2–2
Steaua București	1–1	0–3	2–2	0–1	0–1	3–1	1–0	2–0	0–1	4–2		1–0	1–1	5–0	3–0	2–1	1–1	2–1
Târgu Mureș	1–0	0–1	0–0	2–6	1–0	2–0	1–0	1–0	1–0	4–1	0–1		2–3	1–0	0–2	1–4	0–2	4–0
Politehnica Timișoara	2–2	2–0	3–2	4–1	3–1	2–2	2–0	2–2	2–1	2–1	0–0	0–0		3–1	2–2	4–0	2–1	2–1
Unirea Urziceni	0–3	1–1	1–3	1–0	0–1	2–1	0–3	1–1	0–0	2–1	1–0	0–1	1–1		0–1	1–2	2–1	2–1
Universitatea Cluj	1–0	1–1	1–1	2–1	2–2	2–1	2–1	1–1	1–2	2–0	1–2	1–1	1–2	4–2		3–0	1–1	2–3
FC U Craiova	1–1	1–2	0–0	0–2	2–1	1–2	0–1	0–2	1–1	1–0	0–1	2–1	1–1	3–0	3–0		0–1	1–1
Vaslui	0–0	2–1	5–3	2–0	3–0	1–0	4–0	3–1	1–1	4–2	0–3	1–1	1–1	2–0	2–0	2–1		1–0
Victoria Brănești	1–1	1–1	1–1	2–4	2–3	2–0	1–2	2–0	0–0	1–1	0–1	0–0	0–2	4–1	0–2	1–0	1–3	

Source: LPF (in Romanian)
Legend: Blue = home team win; Yellow = draw; Red = away team win.

== Top goalscorers ==
Rank	Player	Club	Goals
1	(Romania) Ianis Zicu	Timișoara	18
2	(Brazil) Eric	Gaz Metan Mediaș	15
3	(Romania) Claudiu Niculescu	Universitatea Cluj	13
3	(Romania) Bogdan Stancu^{1}	Steaua București	13
3	(Brazil) Wesley	Vaslui	13
6	(Romania) Tiberiu Bălan	Sportul Studențesc	12
7	(Brazil) Adaílton	Vaslui	11
7	(Romania) Ovidiu Herea	Rapid București	11
9	(Romania) Adrian Cristea	Dinamo București / Universitatea Cluj	10
10	(Romania) Robert Ilyeș	Brașov	9
10	(Romania) Vasile Olariu	Victoria Brănești	9
10	(Romania) Gabriel Torje	Dinamo București	9
10	(Romania) Costin Curelea	Sportul Studențesc	9

Source: Liga1.ro (in Romanian)
^{1} Bogdan Stancu was transferred to Galatasaray during the winter transfer window.

== Champion squad ==
Oțelul Galați

Goalkeepers: Branko Grahovac (Bosnia and Herzegovina) (32 / 0); Cristian Brăneț (1 / 0).
Defenders: Samoel Cojoc (7 / 0); Sergiu Costin (31 / 1); Milan Perendija (Serbia) (23 / 0); Laurențiu Petean (6 / 0); Cornel Râpă (33 / 1); Cristian Sârghi (16 / 2); Adrian Sălăgeanu (29 / 1).
Midfielders: Liviu Antal (28 / 7); Laurențiu Buș (9 / 1); Ioan Filip (11 / 0); Gabriel Giurgiu (28 / 4); John Ibeh (Nigeria) (9 / 1); Silviu Ilie (29 / 2); Laurențiu Iorga (28 / 3); Ionuț Neagu (26 / 0); Răzvan Ochiroșii (15 / 0); Gabriel Paraschiv (25 / 6); Gabriel Viglianti (Argentina) (25 / 3).
Forwards: Csaba Borbély (8 / 1); Róbert Elek (2 / 0); Marius Pena (28 / 8); Bratislav Punosevac (Serbia) (10 / 2).
(league appearances and goals listed in brackets)

Manager: Dorinel Munteanu.

== Attendances ==
#	Club	Average
1	Timișoara	11,059
2	Craiova	10,418
3	Steaua	8,424
4	FC Rapid	7,500
5	Oțelul	7,500
6	CFR Cluj	6,812
7	Târgu Mureș	5,324
8	Vaslui	4,441
9	Pandurii	4,250
10	Dinamo 1948	4,175
11	Gaz Metan	3,882
12	U Cluj	3,194
13	Brașov	3,106
14	Gloria	2,912
15	Brănești	2,771
16	Sportul Studenţesc	1,665
17	Unirea	1,488
18	Astra	1,424
