= Sorin Cucu =

Romanian footballer

Personal information
- Full name: Sorin Daniel Cucu
- Date of birth: 17 June 1990 (age 36)
- Place of birth: Galați, Romania
- Height: 1.83 m (6 ft 0 in)
- Position: Left-back

Youth career
- –2009: Oțelul Galați

Senior career*
| Years | Team | Apps | (Gls) |
| 2009–2015 | Oțelul Galați | 7 | (0) |
| 2010–2011 | → Delta Tulcea (loan) | 10 | (1) |
| 2011–2012 | → Delta Tulcea (loan) | 21 | (1) |
| 2013 | → Târgu Mureș (loan) | 3 | (1) |
| 2013–2014 | → Dunărea Galați (loan) | 24 | (0) |
| 2015 | Pont-de-Roide | | |
| 2015–2017 | Belfort | 42 | (0) |
| 2017–2018 | Granville | 23 | (0) |
| 2018–2020 | Jura Sud | 41 | (7) |
| 2020–2023 | Fleury | 54 | (2) |
| 2023–2025 | Créteil | 37 | (1) |
| Total | | 262 | (13) |

International career
| 2008 | Romania U19 | 2 | (0) |
- * Club domestic league appearances and goals as of 10 May 2025

Sorin Daniel Cucu (born 17 June 1990) is a Romanian former professional footballer who played as a left-back.
