= Sergiu Costin =

Romanian football player

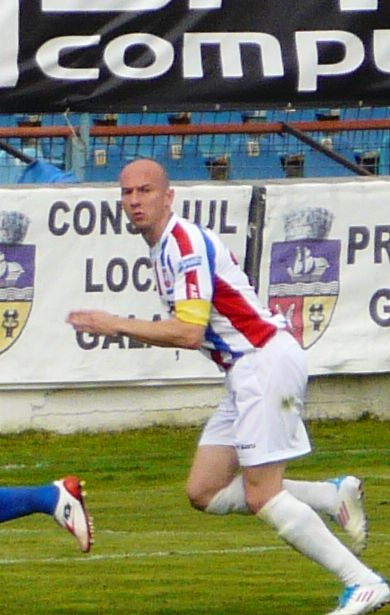

Personal information
- Full name: Sergiu Ioan Viorel Costin
- Date of birth: 21 November 1978 (age 47)
- Place of birth: Bistrița, Romania
- Height: 1.84 m (6 ft 0 in)
- Position: Centre back

Team information
- Current team: Gloria Bistrița (sporting director)

Youth career
- Gloria Bistrița

Senior career*
Years	Team	Apps	(Gls)
1997–2005	Gloria Bistrița	136	(6)
1998–1999	→ Unirea Dej (loan)	17	(4)
1999–2000	→ Olimpia Satu Mare (loan)	21	(3)
2006–2014	Oțelul Galați	209	(9)
2014–2015	Gloria Bistrița		
2015–2016	FC Bistrița	18	(0)
2017–2018	Dumitra	37	(2)
2019	Viitorul Ulmeni	9	(2)
2019–2021	Someșul Dej	21	(2)
Total		468	(28)
- * Club domestic league appearances and goals as of 10:58, 28 April 2022 (UTC)

Sergiu Ioan Viorel Costin (born 21 November 1978) is a Romanian former football player who played as a defender for teams such as Gloria Bistrița, Unirea Dej. Olimpia Satu Mare, Oțelul Galați or Someșul Dej, among others.

== Honours ==
=== Oțelul Galați ===
- Liga I: 2010–11
- Supercupa României: 2011
