= Ionuț Neagu =

Romanian footballer

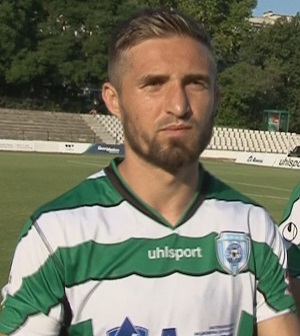

Personal information
- Date of birth: 26 October 1989 (age 37)
- Place of birth: Galați, Romania
- Height: 1.74 m (5 ft 9 in)
- Position: Midfielder

Team information
- Current team: Oțelul Galați (team manager)

Youth career
- –2008: Oțelul Galați

Senior career*
Years	Team	Apps	(Gls)
2008–2009	Oțelul II Galați	25	(5)
2009–2013	Oțelul Galați	110	(3)
2013–2016	Steaua București	16	(0)
2015–2016	→ Karabükspor (loan)	3	(0)
2016–2017	Karabükspor	0	(0)
2016–2017	→ Nea Salamina (loan)	15	(0)
2017–2018	Gaz Metan Mediaș	16	(0)
2019	UTA Arad	15	(1)
2019	Cherno More	5	(0)
2020–2025	Oțelul Galați	96	(8)
Total		300	(17)

International career
2010	Romania U21	4	(0)
2011–2013	Romania	4	(0)

Managerial career
- 2025–: Oțelul Galați (team manager)
- * Club domestic league appearances and goals

Ionuț Neagu (born 26 October 1989) is a Romanian former professional footballer who played as a midfielder, currently team manager at Liga I club Oțelul Galați.

== Club career ==
=== Oțelul Galați ===
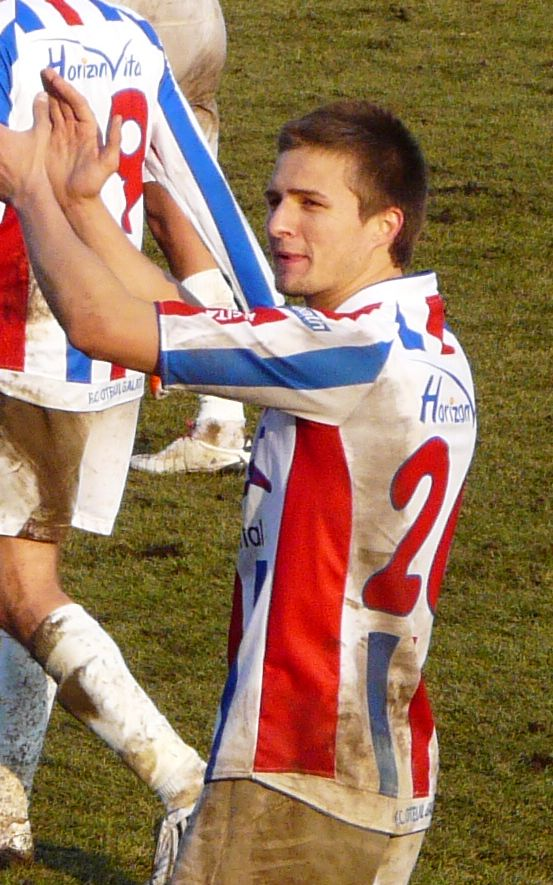
Neagu with Oțelul in 2011

Born in Galați, Neagu began his career with the youth system at Oțelul Galați. He made his professional debut as an 88th-minute substitute in a 1–1 away draw against Brașov on 22 May 2009 and finished 2008–09 season with two appearances. Neagu began to establish himself in the Oțelul first team from the 2009–10 season, making 24 league starts. On 7 March 2010, he scored his first goal in a 1–0 victory over CFR Cluj.

=== Steaua București ===
On 3 September 2013, Neagu agreed to join Steaua București after the club agreed a €620k transfer fee with Oțelul Galați.

=== Cherno More ===
On 27 June 2019, Neagu signed a contract with Bulgarian side Cherno More Varna.

== International career ==
Neagu was capped at international level by Romania.

== Career statistics ==
=== International ===
Appearances and goals by national team and year
National team	Year	Apps	Goals
Romania	2011	1	0
Romania	2012	2	0
Romania	2013	1	0
Total		4	0

== Honours ==
Oțelul Galați

- Liga I: 2010–11
- Cupa României runner-up: 2023–24
- Supercupa României: 2011
- Liga III: 2020–21, 2021–22

Steaua București

- Liga I: 2013–14, 2014–15
- Cupa României: 2014–15
- Cupa Ligii: 2014–15
- Supercupa României runner-up: 2014, 2015
