= Silviu Ilie =

Romanian footballer

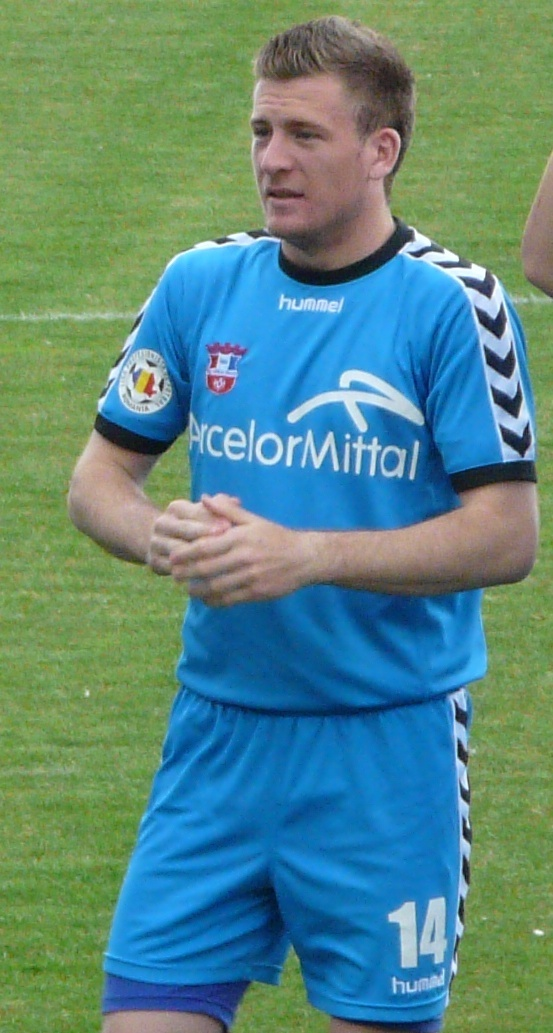

Personal information
- Date of birth: 27 June 1988 (age 38)
- Place of birth: Galați, Romania
- Height: 1.83 m (6 ft 0 in)
- Positions: Left back; left midfielder

Senior career*
Years	Team	Apps	(Gls)
2005–2014	Oțelul Galați	121	(5)
2005–2007	→ Dunărea Galați (loan)	41	(7)
2015	Târgu Mureș	3	(0)
2015	Farul Constanţa	6	(0)
2016	Dunărea Călărași	6	(0)
2017–2018	Oțelul Galați	11	(0)
Total		188	(12)

International career^{‡}
2008–2010	Romania U-21	16	(0)
2010	Romania U-23	1	(0)
2010–2011	Romania	3	(0)
- * Club domestic league appearances and goals as of 6 March 2018 ‡ National team caps and goals as of 11 February 2017

Silviu Ilie (born 27 June 1988) is a Romanian footballer who plays as a left-winger.

Ilie made his debut for the Romania national team at the age of 22 in 2010 in a friendly game against Italy played in Klagenfurt.

== Honours ==
=== FC Oțelul Galați ===
- Liga I: 2010–11
- Supercupa României: 2011
