= Cristian Brăneț =

Romanian footballer

Personal information
- Full name: Cristian Gigi Brăneț
- Date of birth: 14 July 1977 (age 49)
- Place of birth: Galați, Romania
- Height: 1.85 m (6 ft 1 in)
- Position: Goalkeeper

Team information
- Current team: Sporting Liești (assistant)

Youth career
- Dunărea Galați

Senior career*
Years	Team	Apps	(Gls)
1998–2000	Dunărea Galați	35	(0)
2000	Oțelul Galați	0	(0)
2001	Laminorul Roman	19	(0)
2001–2002	Tzafririm Holon	0	(0)
2002–2003	FC Vaslui	17	(0)
2003–2010	Politehnica Iași	152	(0)
2010–2013	Oțelul Galați	37	(0)
Total		260	(0)

Managerial career
- 2014–2015: Oțelul Galați (GK Coach)
- 2015–2016: Delta Dobrogea Tulcea (GK Coach)
- 2018–2021: Sporting Liești (GK Coach)
- 2021–2022: Sporting Liești
- 2022–: Sporting Liești (assistant)
- * Club domestic league appearances and goals as of 09:35, 7 November 2022 (UTC)

Cristian Gigi Brăneț (born 14 July 1977) is a Romanian former footballer who played as a goalkeeper for teams such as Dunărea Galați, Politehnica Iași or Oțelul Galați, among others.

== Honours ==
FC Vaslui

- Liga III: 2002–03

Politehnica Iași

- Liga II: 2003–04

Oțelul Galați

- Liga I: 2010–11
- Supercupa României: 2011
