= Samoel Cojoc =

Romanian footballer

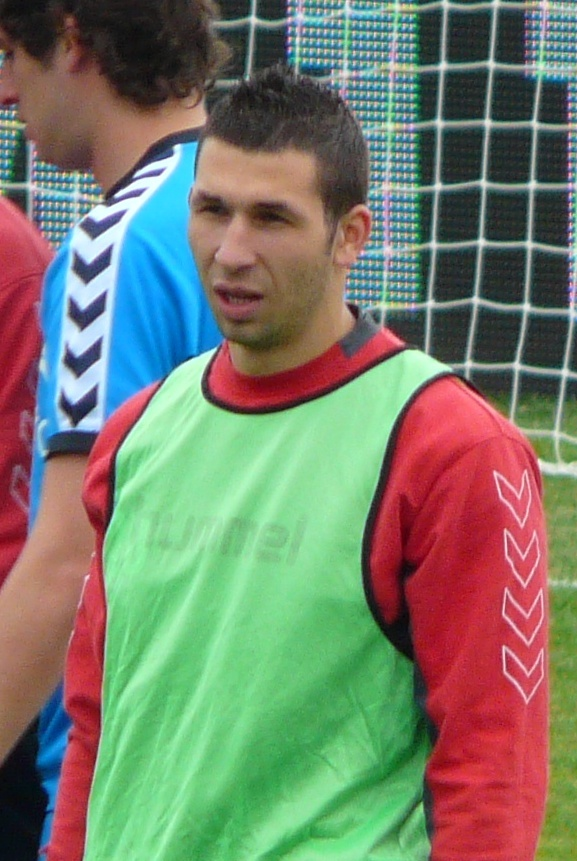

Personal information
- Date of birth: 8 July 1989 (age 37)
- Place of birth: Galați, Romania
- Height: 1.82 m (6 ft 0 in)
- Position: Right back

Team information
- Current team: Delta Dobrogea Tulcea
- Number: 6

Youth career
- Oțelul Galați

Senior career*
Years	Team	Apps	(Gls)
2008–2016	Oțelul Galați	77	(0)
2016	→ Delta Dobrogea Tulcea (loan)		
2016–	Delta Dobrogea Tulcea		

International career^{‡}
2010–2012	Romania U23	1	(0)
- * Club domestic league appearances and goals as of 13 September 2016 ‡ National team caps and goals as of 11 May 2010

Samoel Cojoc (born 8 July 1989) is a Romanian footballer who plays as a defender for Delta Dobrogea Tulcea. He played in Liga I for Oțelul Galați.

== Controversy ==
In June 2013, Cojoc was involved in a street fight in Galați, in which he was stabbed in the abdomen.

== Honours ==
Oţelul Galaţi

- Liga I: 2010–11
