= Laurențiu Buș =

Romanian footballer (born 1987)

Personal information
- Full name: Laurențiu Cosmin Buș
- Date of birth: 27 August 1987 (age 39)
- Place of birth: Cluj-Napoca, Romania
- Height: 1.74 m (5 ft 9 in)
- Position: Midfielder

Youth career
- –2004: Universitatea Cluj

Senior career*
Years	Team	Apps	(Gls)
2003–2006	Universitatea Cluj	37	(3)
2006	Politehnica Timișoara	0	(0)
2006	Politehnica II Timișoara	15	(0)
2007–2009	Universitatea Cluj	46	(6)
2009	Arieșul Turda	9	(0)
2010–2012	Oțelul Galați	31	(1)
2010	→ Arieșul Turda (loan)	9	(3)
2013–2014	Yenisey Krasnoyarsk	32	(0)
2014	Rapid București	12	(1)
2015	Dunărea Călărași	17	(12)
2016	ASA Târgu Mureș	13	(0)
2016	Hapoel Ramat HaSharon	14	(3)
2017–2018	Botoșani	36	(8)
2018–2019	Astra Giurgiu	24	(3)
2019	Botoșani	12	(1)
2019	Academica Clinceni	6	(0)
2020–2021	CSM Reșița	27	(6)
2021–2022	Hunedoara	26	(16)
2023	Progresul 2005		
2023-	FC 2018 Rovine	31	(42)

International career^{‡}
2005–2006	Romania U19	10	(2)
- * Club domestic league appearances and goals as of 18:00, 2 December 2024 (UTC) ‡ National team caps and goals as of 2 December 2024

Laurențiu Cosmin Buș (born 27 August 1987) is a Romanian professional footballer who plays as a midfielder.

== Club career ==
Buș started his career at Universitatea Cluj. In the 2003–04 season he was promoted to the first team.

Buș impressed Politehnica Timișoara's manager, Gheorghe Hagi, who transferred him in the summer of 2006. Soon after that, Gheorghe Hagi was replaced by Sorin Cârţu and Laurențiu Buș was sent to the club's second team, Politehnica Timișoara II.

In 2007 Buș returned to U Cluj and helped the team gain promotion to Liga I. In the summer of 2009 he was transferred to Arieşul Turda. In January 2010 he signed with Oţelul Galaţi.

== International career ==
Buș played several matches for the Romanian national under-19 team.

== Personal life ==
Buș's younger brother, Sergiu, is also a professional footballer.

== Honours ==
Universitatea Cluj

- Liga II: 2006–07

Oțelul Galați

- Liga I: 2010–11
- Supercupa României: 2011

CS Hunedoara

- Liga III: 2021–22
