= Marius Pena =

Romanian footballer

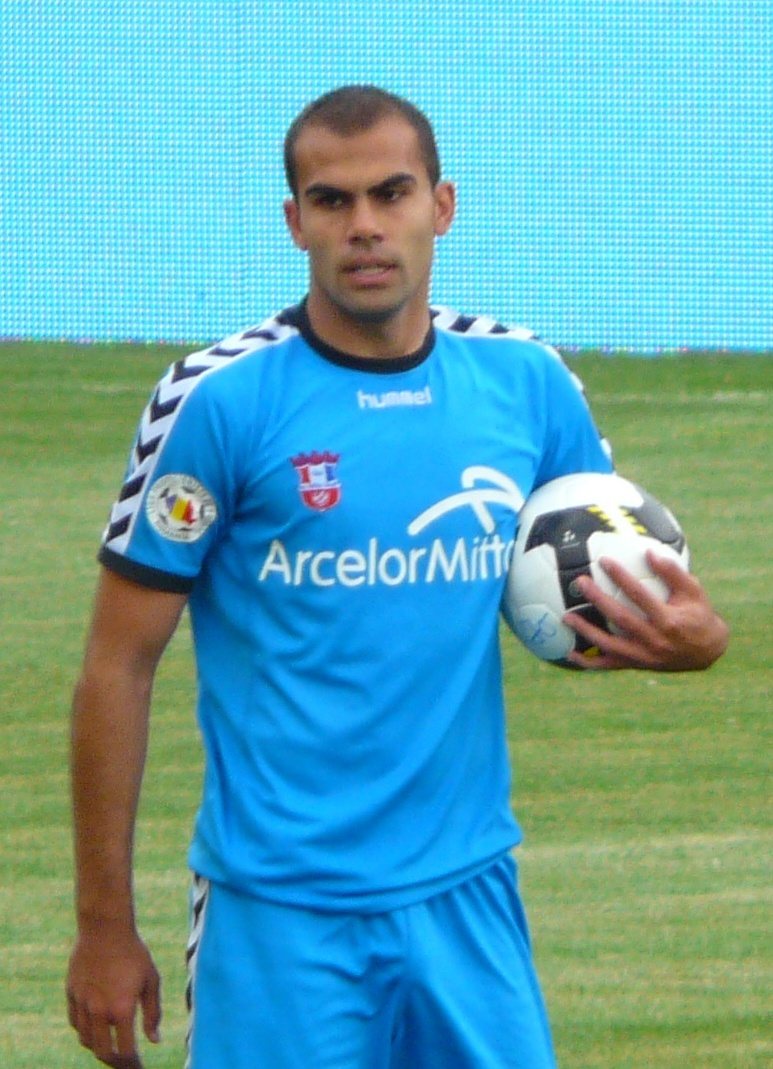
- Pena in 2010

Personal information
- Full name: Marius George Pena
- Date of birth: 2 May 1985 (age 41)
- Place of birth: Bucharest, Romania
- Height: 1.83 m (6 ft 0 in)
- Position: Forward

Youth career
- –2002: Național București

Senior career*
Years	Team	Apps	(Gls)
2002	Național București	2	(1)
2003	Torpedo-2 Moscow	5	(0)
2004	Steaua II București		
2005	Rapid II București	24	(6)
2006	CSM Râmnicu Vâlcea	14	(1)
2006–2008	Concordia Chiajna	31	(17)
2008–2013	Oțelul Galați	127	(26)
2013–2014	Baku	30	(6)
2014–2018	Concordia Chiajna	120	(11)
2019–2022	Progresul 05 București		
Total		353	(67)

Managerial career
- 2024–2025: Concordia Chiajna (assistant)
- * Club domestic league appearances and goals

Marius George Pena (born 2 May 1985) is a Romanian former professional footballer who played as a forward.

== Career ==
On 14 September 2011, Pena scored the equalizing goal in Oțelul Galați's 2–1 loss to Basel in the 2011–12 UEFA Champions League group stage after chipping in cleverly a shot that Swiss goalkeeper spilled.

In August 2014, Pena signed a two-year contract with Concordia Chiajna.

== Personal life ==
He is the son of Gheorghe Pena, a striker who played in the 80's for Progresul București, Olt Scornicești and Steaua București.

== Honours ==
Concordia Chiajna

- Liga III: 2006–07
- Cupa Ligii runner-up: 2015–16

Oțelul Galați

- Liga I: 2010–11
- Supercupa României: 2011
