= Gabriel Giurgiu =

Romanian footballer

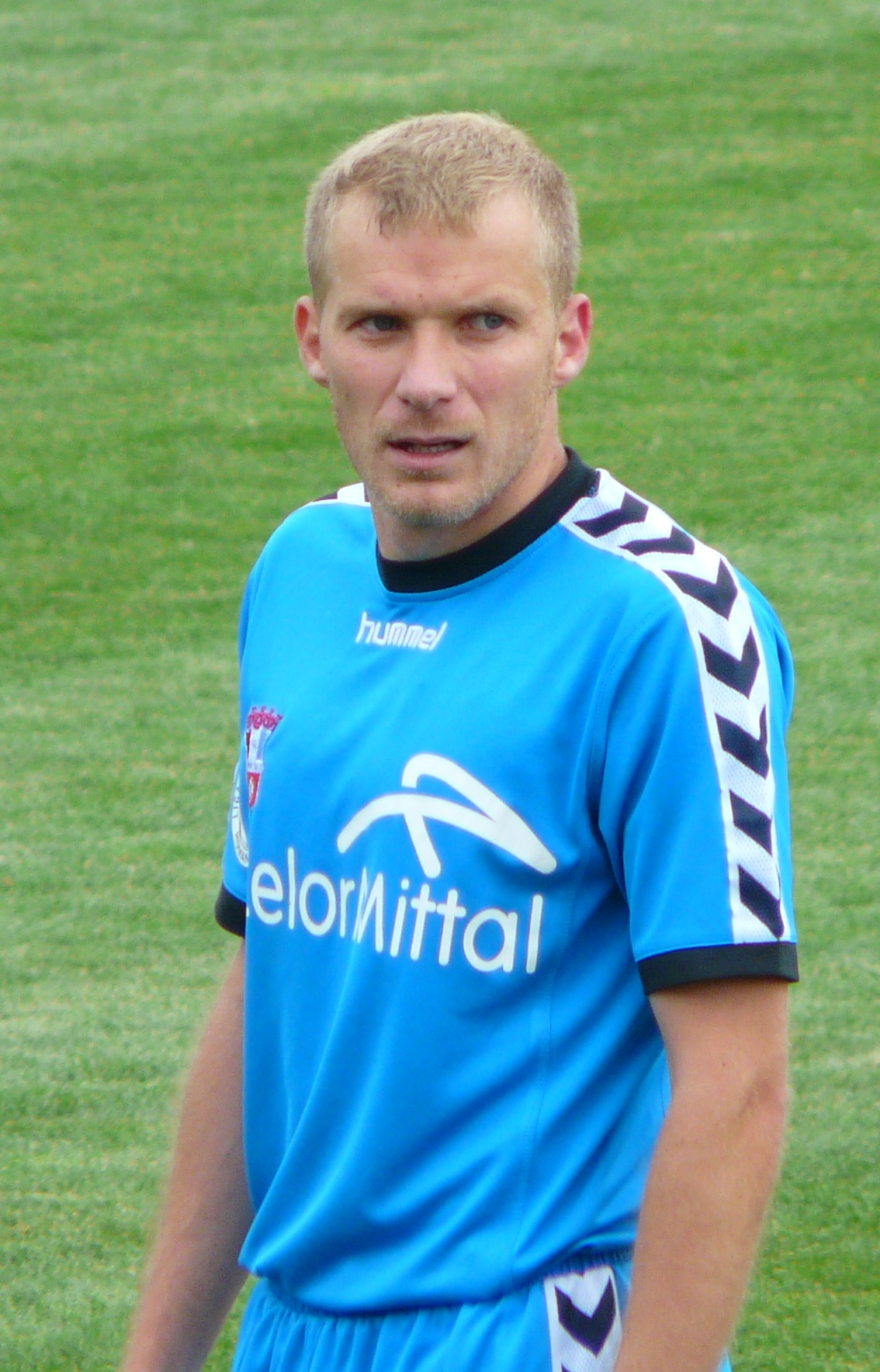
- Giurgiu in 2010

Personal information
- Full name: Gabriel Nicu Giurgiu
- Date of birth: 3 September 1982 (age 44)
- Place of birth: Cluj-Napoca, Romania
- Height: 1.75 m (5 ft 9 in)
- Position: Central midfielder

Team information
- Current team: Universitatea Cluj (sporting director)

Youth career
- –2000: Universitatea Cluj

Senior career*
Years	Team	Apps	(Gls)
2000–2006	Universitatea Cluj	151	(11)
2007	Oțelul Galați	15	(0)
2007–2008	Rubin Kazan	4	(0)
2008	→ Oțelul Galați (loan)	18	(0)
2009–2014	Oțelul Galați	163	(14)
2014–2015	Maccabi Netanya	26	(1)
2015–2016	Concordia Chiajna	36	(4)
2016–2019	Universitatea Cluj	79	(11)
2019	Victoria Cluj	15	(5)
Total		507	(46)

International career
2011–2012	Romania	2	(0)

Managerial career
- 2021–: Universitatea Cluj (sporting director)
- * Club domestic league appearances and goals

Gabriel Nicu Giurgiu (born 3 September 1982) is a Romanian former professional footballer who played as a central midfielder, currently he is the sporting director of Liga I club Universitatea Cluj.

== Club career ==
Giurgiu started his senior career in Universitatea Cluj. In January 2007, he signed up in Oțelul Galați. After a series of good performances he was transferred to Rubin Kazan during the summer break in 2007. A few months later, in January 2008, he was loaned back to Oțelul until the end of the season. In May, he returned to Rubin. In January 2009, he completed his return to Oțelul Galați.

== International career ==
Giurgiu made his debut for the Romania national team at the age of 28 in 2011 in a friendly game against Brazil.

=== International stats ===
Appearances and goals by national team and year
National team	Year	Apps	Goals
Romania	2011	1	0
Romania	2012	1	0
Total		2	0

== Honours ==
Universitatea Cluj

- Liga III: 2000–01, 2017–18
- Liga IV – Cluj County: 2016–17

Oțelul Galați

- UEFA Intertoto Cup: 2007
- Liga I: 2010–11
- Supercupa României: 2011

Rubin Kazan

- Russian Premier League: 2008

Concordia Chiajna

- Cupa Ligii runner-up: 2015–16
