= 2011–12 FC Politehnica Timișoara season =

Politehnica Timișoara
2011–12 season
- Chairman: Marian Iancu
- Manager: Valentin Velcea
- Stadium: Dan Păltinişanu
- Liga II: 2nd
- Romanian Cup: Round of 16
- Top goalscorer: League: Goga (5); All: Goga (7)
- Highest home attendance: 27,000 vs Steaua București (27 October 2011 )
- Lowest home attendance: 1,000 vs Chindia Târgovişte (21 October 2011)
- Average home league attendance: 5,500
Home colours	Away colours

The 2011–12 season will be Politehnica Timișoara's 5th season in Liga II.

Poli finished 2nd in the table at the end of the 2010–11 Liga I season and was supposed to play in the 2011–12 UEFA Champions League, but were relegated to the Liga II because of accumulated debt.

== Season 2011–2012 ==
=== Pre-season ===
==== Transfers ====
On 4 June 2011, the capitan Dan Alexa signed with Bucharest rival Rapid București. Also with Rapid signed the defender Ovidiu Burcă.

On 16 June 2011, defenders Nikola Ignjatijević and Hélder returns to Red Star Belgrade and AS Nancy after their loan season expired. Also on 16 June, the last season Liga I top scorer Ianis Zicu signed with CSKA Sofia for €500,000 and goalkeeper Pedro Taborda terminate his contract.

On 18 June, it was confirmed that defender Jiří Krejčí was released by the club, also on 18 June Lukáš Magera and Marián Čišovský was released.

==== Friendlies ====
For the pre-season, Politehnica Timișoara will visit Hungary and Austria. It will be Poli's tenth trip to the Austria, where they will face Tatran Prešov on 30 June, Austria Salzburg on 1 July, Neftchi Baku on 3 July and SV Bischofshofen on 7 July. Also confirmed are 2 pre-season friendlies with Bihor Oradea.

== Transfers ==
=== In ===
Date	Player	Previous club	Cost

=== Out ===
Date	Player	New Club	Cost
4 June 2011	(Romania) Dan Alexa	Rapid București	Free
16 June 2011	(Romania) Ianis Zicu	CSKA Sofia	€500,000
16 June 2011	(Portugal) Pedro Taborda	Free Agent	Released
18 June 2011	(Czech Republic) Lukáš Magera	Free Agent	Released
18 June 2011	(Slovakia) Marián Čišovský	Free Agent	Released
18 June 2011	(Czech Republic) Jiří Krejčí	Free Agent	Released
19 June 2011	(Romania) Ovidiu Burcă	Rapid București	Free
19 July 2011	(Romania) Sorin Ghionea	Free Agent	Released
25 July 2011	(Romania) Alexandru Bourceanu	Steaua București	€700,000
5 August 2011	(Romania) Costel Pantilimon	(England) Manchester City	Undisclosed

=== Loaned out ===
Date	Player	Club	Cost	Return date
25 July 2011	(Montenegro) Stefan Nikolić	Steaua București	€250,000	End of 2011–12 season

== Squad list ==
Note: Flags indicate national team as defined under FIFA eligibility rules; some limited exceptions apply. Players may hold more than one non-FIFA nationality.

No.	Pos.	Nation	Player
1	GK	EST	Sergei Lepmets
2	DF	ROU	Andrei Dăruială
3	DF	ROU	Florin Sandu
4	DF	ROU	Claudiu Iordache
5	MF	ROU	Adrian Poparadu
6	DF	ROU	Florin Ilie
7	MF	ROU	Alexandru Curtean
8	DF	ROU	László Sepsi
9	FW	ROU	Mircea Axente
10	MF	ROU	Iulian Tameş (Capitan)
11	FW	ROU	Andrei Zăgrean
12	GK	BUL	Mario Kirev
13	DF	ROU	Cristian Scutaru
14	DF	ROU	Ioan Mera
15	MF	ROU	Adrian Zaluschi
16	DF	ROU	Samuel Jitaru

No.	Pos.	Nation	Player
18	FW	ROU	Alexandru Popovici
20	MF	MDA	Artur Pătraş
21	FW	ROU	Dorin Goga
22	DF	ROU	Andrei Sava
23	MF	ARG	Nicolás Gorobsov
24	MF	ROU	Adrian Popa
25	MF	ROU	Cătălin Chiş
30	DF	BRA	Rafael Rocha
33	MF	ROU	Marian Fuchs
34	MF	ROU	Răzvan Dobricean
87	FW	CAN	Tosaint Ricketts
99	GK	ROU	Ciprian Ostafie
—	DF	ROU	Ionut Cuciorvă
—	DF	ROU	Răzvan Iovan
—	GK	ROU	Paul Iordache
—	GK	ROU	Andrei Cobliş

== Long-term injury list ==
Date Injured	Player	Injury	Return Date

== Starting XI ==

4–3–3 Formation

== Match results ==
=== Pre-season ===
21 June 2011 Matchday 1	Politehnica Timișoara (Romania)	1–2	(Hungary) Ferencváros	Tiszaújváros
17:00	Axente 78'	Report	Oláh 4'; Alison 61'	Stadium: Városi Stadion; Attendance: 1,000; Referee: Unknown

30 June 2011 Matchday 2	Politehnica Timișoara (Romania)	2–1	(Slovakia) Tatran Prešov	Bischofshofen
19:00	Ricketts 27'; Nikolić 80'	Report	Guba 70'	Stadium: Bischofshofen Complex; Attendance: 120; Referee: Unknown

1 July 2011 Matchday 3	Politehnica Timișoara (Romania)	3–0	Austria Salzburg	Bischofshofen
19:00	Goga 2' 40'; Rocha 31'	Report		Stadium: Bischofshofen Complex; Attendance: 300; Referee: Unknown

2 July 2011 Matchday 4	Politehnica Timișoara (Romania)	0–1	(Azerbaijan) Neftchi Baku	Bischofshofen
17:00		Report	Mpenza 69'	Stadium: Bischofshofen Complex; Attendance: 100; Referee: Unknown

5 July 2011 Matchday 5	Politehnica Timișoara (Romania)	2–3	(North Macedonia) FK Škendija	Bischofshofen
16:30	Nikolić 30'; Curtean 88'	Report	Hasani 10' 45' 56'	Stadium: Bischofshofen Complex; Attendance: 250; Referee: Unknown

7 July 2011 Matchday 6	Politehnica Timișoara (Romania)	9–0	(Austria) SV Bischofshofen	Bischofshofen
18:15	Ricketts 5'; Axente 22' 39' 87'; Goga 25' 50' 60'; Adrian Popa 70'; Popovici 84'	Report		Stadium: Bischofshofen Complex; Attendance: 250; Referee: Unknown

12 July 2011 Matchday 7	Bihor Oradea (Romania)	3–1	(Romania) Politehnica Timișoara	Oradea
18:00	Sulea 36'; Selagea 43'; Achim 87'	Report	Axente 83'	Stadium: Iuliu Bodola; Attendance: 11,000; Referee: Unknown

15 July 2011 Matchday 8	Politehnica Timișoara (Romania)	1–0	(Romania) Bihor Oradea	Timișoara
18:00	Goga 56'	Report		Stadium: Dan Păltinişanu; Attendance: 7,000; Referee: Unknown

30 July 2011 Matchday 9	Politehnica Timișoara (Romania)	3–1	(Romania) Naţional Sebiş	Timișoara
11:00	Zăgrean 6'; Axente 13'; Popovici 64'	Report	Lung 75'	Stadium: Dan Păltinișanu Sport Complexe; Attendance: 2,000; Referee: Unknown

3 August 2011 Matchday 10	Gyula (Hungary)	1–3	(Romania) Politehnica Timișoara	Gyula
16:00	Unknown 37'	Report	Popovici 8' 31'; Rotariu 64'	Stadium: Gyula Stadium; Attendance: 150; Referee: Unknown

=== Liga II ===
19 August 2011 Round 1	Politehnica Timișoara	2–0	Bihor Oradea	Timișoara
20:00	Scutaru 24'; Axente 56'	Report		Stadium: Dan Păltinişanu; Attendance: 8,000; Referee: Mihai Prodan

27 August 2011 Round 2	Alro Slatina	2–3	Politehnica Timișoara	Slatina
11:00	Creţu 38'; Precup 62' (pen.)	Report	Ricketts 31'; Pătraş 66'; Tameş 89' (pen.)	Stadium: 1 Mai; Attendance: 9,000; Referee: Mugurel Drăgănescu

3 September 2011 Round 3	Politehnica Timișoara	1–0	FC Olt	Timișoara
11:00	Goga 60'	Report		Stadium: Dan Păltinişanu; Attendance: 3,000; Referee: Dan Monea

11 September 2011 Round 4	Gloria Bistriţa	2–2	Politehnica Timișoara	Bistriţa
20:00	Feher 21'; Voinea 52'	Report	Curtean 34'; Goga 47'	Stadium: Gloria; Attendance: 2,000; Referee: Alexandru Deaconu

17 September 2011 Round 5	Unirea Alba Iulia	1–1	Politehnica Timișoara	Alba Iulia
13:00	Bumbac 87'	Report	Tameş 81' (pen.)	Stadium: Cetate; Attendance: 2,500; Referee: Mihai Ene

25 September 2011 Round 6	Politehnica Timișoara	2–1	Gaz Metan Severin	Timișoara
13:00	Goga 26'; Ricketts 43'	Report	Boroiban 68'	Stadium: Dan Păltinişanu; Attendance: 7,000; Referee: Teodor Craciunescu

30 September 2011 Round 7	UTA Arad	0–0	Politehnica Timișoara	Arad
19:00		Report		Stadium: Francisc von Neumann; Attendance: 12,000; Referee: Florin Marcu

8 October 2011 Round 8	Politehnica Timișoara	3–2	FC Baia Mare	Timișoara
18:00	Zăgrean 4' 59'; Tameş 18' (pen.)	Report	Bota 6' (pen.); Dragoş 75'	Stadium: Dan Păltinişanu; Attendance: 6,000; Referee: Marius Omut

15 October 2011 Round 9	Luceafărul Oradea	1–0	Politehnica Timișoara	Sânmartin
11:00	Lupuţ 90+3'	Report		Stadium: Luceafărul; Attendance: 1,000; Referee: Florin Dreve

21 October 2011 Round 10	Politehnica Timișoara	1–0	Chindia Târgovişte	Timișoara
17:00	Sandu 56'	Report		Stadium: Dan Păltinişanu; Attendance: 1,000; Referee: Marian Balaci

29 October 2011 Round 11	Mureşul Deva	0–3	Politehnica Timișoara	Deva
11:00		Report	Sepsi 45'; Axente 59'; Goga 90+2'	Stadium: Cetate; Attendance: 4,000; Referee: Sebastian Colţescu

5 November 2011 Round 12	Politehnica Timișoara	3–0	Argeş Piteşti	Timișoara
12:00	Axente 9'; Ricketts 23'; Goga 65'	Report		Stadium: Dan Păltinişanu; Attendance: 5,000; Referee: Adrian Comănescu

=== Romanian Cup ===
23 August 2011 Round IV	CSM Reșița	0–0 (3–4 p)	Politehnica Timișoara	Reșița
17:00		Report		Stadium: Mircea Chivu; Attendance: 11,500; Referee: Unknown
	Penalties
	Unknown (penalty scored); Unknown (penalty scored); Unknown (penalty missed); Unknown (penalty missed); Unknown (penalty scored)		Tameş (penalty missed); Axente (penalty scored); Sepsi (penalty scored); Luchin (penalty scored); Pătraş (penalty scored)

6 September 2011 Round V	Național Sebiș	1–2	Politehnica Timișoara	Sebiş
17:00	Băd 10'	Report	Tameş 20' (pen.); Popovici 88'	Stadium: Municipal; Attendance: 10,000; Referee: Unknown

21 September 2011 Round of 32	Politehnica Timișoara	2–0	Ceahlăul Piatra Neamț	Timișoara
18:00	Goga 17'; Curtean 75'	Report		Stadium: Dan Păltinişanu; Attendance: 6,000; Referee: Florin Miron

27 October 2011 Round of 16	Politehnica Timișoara	2–0	Steaua București	Timișoara
20:30	Ricketts 29'; Goga 50'	Report		Stadium: Dan Păltinişanu; Attendance: 27,000; Referee: Cristian Balaj

== Player statistics ==
No.	Pos.	Nationality	Player	L	RC	Total	Goal
1	GK	Estonia	Sergei Lepmets	12	4	16	0	0	0
2	DF	Romania	Andrei Dăruială	9	1	10	0	2	0
3	DF	Romania	Florin Sandu	3	1	4	1	0	0
5	MF	Romania	Adrian Poparadu	7	3	10	0	2	0
6	MF	Romania	Florin Ilie	10	3	13	0	1	0
7	MF	Romania	Alexandru Curtean	10	3	13	2	0	0
8	DF	Romania	László Sepsi	9	4	13	1	0	0
9	FW	Romania	Mircea Axente	10	3	13	3	4	1
10	MF	Romania	Iulian Tameş	9	3	12	4	0	0
11	FW	Romania	Andrei Zăgrean	8	3	11	2	0	0
13	DF	Romania	Cristian Scutaru	11	4	15	1	5	0
14	DF	Romania	Ioan Mera	6	3	9	1	3	0
15	MF	Romania	Adrian Zaluschi	1	1	2	1	1	0
16	MF	Romania	Samuel Jitaru	2	1	3	0	0	0
18	FW	Romania	Alex Popovici	9	3	12	1	1	0
19	MF	Argentina	Nicolás Gorobsov	7	1	8	0	3	0
20	MF	(Romania) Moldova	Artur Pătraş	6	3	9	1	2	0
21	FW	Romania	Dorin Goga	10	3	13	7	2	1
22	DF	Romania	Andrei Sava	2	0	2	0	0	0
23	MF	Romania	Răzvan Dobricean	3	0	3	0	1	0
25	MF	Romania	Cătălin Chiş	5	1	6	0	0	0
27	MF	Romania	Dorinel Rotariu	0	1	1	0	0	0
30	MF	Brazil	Rafael Rocha	5	3	8	0	3	0
33	MF	Romania	Marian Fuchs	1	0	0	0	0	0
87	FW	Canada	Tosaint Ricketts	8	3	11	4	1	0
No.	Pos.	Nationality	Player	L	RC	Total	Goal

- Last Update: 9 July 2011
- Data includes all competitions
- Substitution appearances included as full
- L – Liga II
- RC – Romanian Cup
- Ast – Assists
- N/A – Refers to a player who began the season a Politehnica Timișoara player but left the club over the course of the campaign

=== Top scorer ===
As of the 2011–12 Liga II Season

P.	Player	Position	Liga II	Romanian Cup	Total
1	(Romania) Dorin Goga	Forward	5	2	7
2	(Romania) Iulian Tameş	Midfielder	3	1	4
3	(Romania) Mircea Axente	Forward	4	0	4
4	(Canada) Tosaint Ricketts	Forward	3	1	4
5	(Romania) Alexandru Curtean	Midfielder	1	1	2

=== Most appearances ===
As of the 2011–12 Liga II Season

P.	Player	Position	Liga II	Romanian Cup	Total
1	(Estonia) Sergei Lepmets	Goalkeeper	12	4	16
2	(Romania) Cristian Scutaru	Defender	11	4	15
3	(Romania) László Sepsi	Defender	9	4	13
4	(Romania) Florin Ilie	Midfielder	10	3	13
5	(Romania) Alexandru Curtean	Midfielder	10	3	13

=== Most assists ===
As of the 2011–12 Liga II Season

P.	Player	Position	Liga II	Romanian Cup	Total
1	(Romania) Alexandru Curtean	Midfielder	3	0	3
2	(Romania) László Sepsi	Left back	2	1	3
3	(Romania) Mircea Axente	Forward	2	0	2
4	(Romania) Dorin Goga	Forward	1	1	2
5	(Romania) Andrei Zăgrean	Forward	1	1	2

== Liga II results by round ==
Round	1	2	3	4	5	6	7	8	9	10	11	12	13	14	15	16	17	18	19	20	21	22	23	24	25	26	27	28	29	30	31	32	33	34
Ground	H	A	H	A	A	H	A	H	A	H	A	H																						
Result	W	W	W	D	D	W	D	W	L	W	W	W																						
Position	1	1	1	3	3	2	2	1	2	2	2	2																						

A = Away; H = Home; W = Win; D = Draw; L = Loss
