= 2010–11 FC Timișoara season =

FC Timișoara
2010–11 season
- President: Gheorghe Chivorchian
- Manager: Vladimir Petrović (Rounds 1-7); Cosmin Contra (Rounds 7-18); Dušan Uhrin, Jr. (Rounds 18-)
- Ground: Dan Păltinişanu (Capacity: 32,972)
- Liga I: 2nd
- Cupa României: Quarterfinals
- Europa League: Play-off round
- Top goalscorer: League: Zicu (18); All: Zicu (19)
- Highest home attendance: 28,000 vs Manchester City (19 August 2010)
- Lowest home attendance: 1,000 vs Voinţa Sibiu (27 October 2010)
- Average home league attendance: 12,375
Home colours	Away colours	Third colours

The 2010–11 season saw FC Timișoara participate in Liga I, the Romanian Cup, and the UEFA Europa League.

In November 2010, a Romanian Court of Appeal returned the name, the colors and the record of AEK Politehnica Timișoara to FC Timișoara. Due to rules that forbid changes of team names during a season, the team used the name FC Timișoara until the end of 2010–11 season.

== Team kit ==
The team kit is produced by Lotto and the shirt sponsor is Balkan Petroleum.

== Previous season positions ==
	Competition	Position
(European Union)	UEFA Europa League	4th / Group Stage
(Romania)	Liga I	5th
(Romania)	Cupa României	Round of 16

== Players ==
=== Squad information ===
N	Pos.	Nat.	Name	Age	EU	Since	App	Goals	Ends	Transfer fee	Notes
1	GK	(Romania)	Cobliș	36	EU	2008	0	0	2014	50.000€	
4	CB	(Romania)	Luchin	40	EU	2005	59	3	2014	Youth Academy	
5	MF	(Romania)	Alexa	46	EU	2006	106	3	2013	Free	
7	RW	(Romania)	Curtean	43	EU	2009	20	1	2013	€1.5	Also plays as LW
8	LB	(Romania)	Sepsi	40	EU	2010	17	0	2014	€2.5M	
9	FW	(Romania)	Axente	39	EU	2006	4	0	2013	Free	
10	MF	(Romania)	Tameş	47	EU	2010	0	0	2012	Free	
11	FW	(Senegal)	Mansour	40	Non-EU	2005	81	17	2012	Free	
13	CB	(Romania)	Scutaru	39	EU	2005	20	0	2014	200k	
14	CB	(Romania)	Mera	39	EU	2005	18	2	2014	Youth Academy	
15	RW	(Romania)	Chiacu	40	EU	2009	15	4	2014	100.000€	
17	FW	(Czech Republic)	Magera	43	EU	2008	56	13	2012	€1.5	
20	CB	(Serbia)	Popović	43	EU	2010	0	0	2012	Free	
21	FW	(Romania)	Goga	42	EU	2008	47	15	2013	€1.5	Also plays as LW
22	MF	(Romania)	Contra	50	EU	2010	13	3	2011	Free	
24	DF	(Serbia)	Dukić	40	EU	2010	0	0	2013	Free	
27	LW	(Romania)	Zicu	42	EU	2010	1	0	2015	500.000€	Also play RW
28	CB	(Slovakia)	Čišovský	46	EU	2008	39	3	2012	€1.0	
29	GK	(Romania)	Pantilimon	39	EU	2005	62	0	2014	Free	
30	LW	(Romania)	Sandu	38	EU	2007	1	0	2013	500k	
31	MF	(Romania)	Poparadu	38	EU	2006	1	0	2013	Youth Academy	
33	MF	(Romania)	Popovici	38	EU	2006	3	0	2013	Youth Academy	
55	MF	(Romania)	Bourceanu	41	EU	2009	29	1	2013	€1.0M	
99	GK	(Portugal)	Taborda	48	EU	2008	21	0	2012	600k	

- Last updated: 21:00, 13 June 2010 (UTC)
- Source: Poli News

=== Transfers ===
==== In ====
Date	Player	Previous Club	Cost
1 June 2010	(Serbia) Dukić	Hajduk Kula	Undisclosed
5 June 2010	(Serbia) Popović	Spartak Subotica	Undisclosed
5 June 2010	(Romania) Tameş	Argeş Pitești	Undisclosed
20 July 2010	(Romania) Chiacu	Dinamo București
21 July 2010	(Romania) Zicu	Dinamo București	€500.000
10 August 2010	(Romania) Burcă	Energie Cottbus	Free

==== Out ====
Date	Player	To	Cost
1 June 2010	(Bosnia and Herzegovina) Supić	FC Timișoara II	Undisclosed
1 June 2010	(Portugal) Costa	Free agent	Undisclosed
1 June 2010	(Romania) Cociş	Al-Nassr	Undisclosed
1 June 2010	(Togo) Nibombé	FK Baku	Undisclosed
8 July 2010	(Romania) Latovlevici	Steaua București	€600.0000
12 July 2010	(Romania) Ionescu	Free agent
21 July 2010	(Slovakia) Kozák	Free agent
21 July 2010	(Slovakia) Brezinský	Free agent	.
25 August 2010	(Serbia) Popović	Free agent	Undisclosed.

==== Spending ====
Summer: ▼€0 million

Winter: ▼€0 million

Total: ▼€0 million

==== Income ====
Summer: ▲€600.000k

Winter: ▲€0 million

Total: ▲€600.000k

=== Squad stats ===
				Total			UEFA Europa League		Liga I		Cupa României	
No.	Pos.	Nat.	Name	Sts	App	Gls	App	Gls	App	Gls	App	Gls
4	CB	(Romania)	Luchin	8	11		3		7		1	
5	DM	(Romania)	Alexa	12	12		4		8			
7	LW	(Romania)	Curtean	12	13	2	3		9	2	1	
8	LB	(Romania)	Sepsi	10	11		4		7			
9	FW	(Romania)	Axente	12	12	5	3	2	9	3		
10	MF	(Romania)	Tameş	4	8	2	2	1	5		1	1
11	FW	(Senegal)	Mansour	3	4	1	1		2		1	1
13	RB	(Romania)	Scutaru	11	11	2	4		6	2	1	
14	CB	(Romania)	Mera	7	11		4		6		1	
15	RW	(Romania)	Chiacu	1	4		1		2		1	
17	FW	(Czech Republic)	Magera	11	13	3	4		9	3		
20	RW	(Brazil)	Hélder	3	3	1			3	1		
21	FW	(Romania)	Goga	7	13	2	4		8	1	1	1
22	MF	(Romania)	Contra	5	9	1	4	1	5			
24	RB	(Serbia)	Dukić	2	3		1		1		1	
25	CB	(Romania)	Burcă	5	5		1		4			
27	LW	(Romania)	Zicu	1	9	3	3	1	6	2		
28	CB	(Slovakia)	Čišovský	3	10	1	3	1	6		1	
29	GK	(Romania)	Pantilimon	11	11		5		5		1	
55	MF	(Romania)	Bourceanu	14	13	1	4		9	1		
99	GK	(Portugal)	Taborda	2	4		2		2			

Last updated: 08:37, 3 June 2010 (UTC)
Source: Match reports in competitive matches, FCPT (in Romanian)
Ordered by start team, game starts and position on pitch (from back right to front left)
0 shown as blank

=== Goalscorers ===
Player	Liga I	Cupa României	Europa League	Fixture Total	Friendlies	Total
(Romania) Mircea Axente	5	0	2	0	7	15
(Romania) Iulian Tameş	0	1	1	0	3	5
(Romania) Alexandru Curtean	2	0	0	0	3	5
(Romania) Dorin Goga	1	1	0	1	3	5
(Czech Republic) Lukáš Magera	3	0	0	1	3	6
(Romania) Adrian Poparadu	0	0	0	0	2	2
(Romania) Ioan Mera	0	0	0	0	2	2
(Romania) Alexandru Bourceanu	0	0	0	0	2	2
(Senegal) Gueye Mansour	0	1	0	0	1	2
(Romania) Cosmin Contra	1	0	0	0	1	1
(Romania) Alexandru Popovici	0	0	0	0	1	1
(Slovenia) Dare Vršič	0	0	0	0	1	1
(Romania) Ianis Zicu	7	0	1	0	0	8
(Brazil) Hélder	1	0	0	0	0	1
(Romania) Cristian Scutaru	2	0	2	0	0	2
Own goals
	0	0	0	0	0	0

Last updated:09:41, 3 June 2010 (UTC)
Source: FCPT (in Romanian)

=== Start formations ===
Qnt	Formation	Match(es)
1	4-4-2	1,
2	4-2-2-2	2,

Last updated: 09:41, 3 June 2010 (UTC)
Source: Match reports in Competitive matches
Only competitive matches.

=== Starting 11 ===
No.	Pos.	Nat.	Name	MS	Notes
29	GK	(Romania)	Pantilimon	12	
8	LB	(Romania)	Sepsi	8	
28	CB	(Slovakia)	Čišovský	8	
4	CB	(Romania)	Luchin	7	
13	RB	(Romania)	Scutaru	8	
27	LW	(Romania)	Zicu	5	
55	AM	(Romania)	Bourceanu	10	
5	DM	(Romania)	Alexa	10	
7	LW	(Romania)	Curtean	10	
9	FW	(Romania)	Axente	10	
17	FW	(Czech Republic)	Magera	9	

Last updated: 15:05, 23 May 2010 (UTC)
Source: Squad stats and Start formations.
Only competitive matches.
Using the most used start formation.
Ordered by position on pitch (from back right to front left).

=== Overall ===
	Total	Home	Away
Games played	35	17	18
Games won	15	8	7
Games drawn	16	8	8
Games lost	3	1	2
Biggest win	4–0 vs. U Craiova	4-0 vs. U Craiova	3–1 vs. Juventus București
Biggest lose	2–0 vs. Manchester City	0-1 vs. Manchester City	2-0 vs. Manchester City
Clean sheets	8	4	4
Goals scored	58	31	27
Goals conceded	42	23	19
Goal difference	+16	+8	+8
Top scorer	Zicu (18)	11	7

Last updated: 09:41, 3 June 2010 (UTC)
Source: Competitive matches

=== International appearances ===
Player	Position	Country	Caps this season	Goals this season
László Sepsi	Left back	Romania	vs. Honduras	vs.
Winston Parks	Forward	Costa Rica	vs. France, Switzerland, Slovakia	vs. Switzerland
Ján Kozák	Playmaker	Slovakia	vs. Cameroon, Paraguay	vs.
Costel Pantilimon	Goalkeeper	Romania	vs. North Macedonia, Belarus, France, Italy, Ukraine, Bosnia and Herzegovina	vs.
Cosmin Contra	Right back	Romania	vs. Belarus	vs.
Lukáš Magera	Forward	Czech Republic	vs. Scotland	vs.
Ianis Zicu	Attacking midfielder	Romania	vs. France, Ukraine, Cyprus, Bosnia and Herzegovina, Luxembourg	vs. Luxembourg
Dan Alexa	Midfielder	Romania	vs. Italy, Ukraine, Bosnia and Herzegovina	vs. Ukraine, Ukraine
Artur Pătraş	Winger	Moldova	vs. Poland, Andorra	vs.
Tosaint Ricketts	Forward	Canada	vs. Greece, Belarus	vs.

== Competitions ==
=== Overall ===
Competition	Started round	Current position / round	Final position / round	First match	Last match
Liga I	—	2nd	—	25 July 2010	—
Cupa României	Round of 32	Eliminated	Quarterfinals	22 September 2010	10 November 2010
Europa League	Third qualifying round	Eliminated	Play-off round	29 July 2010	26 August 2010

=== Liga I ===
==== League table ====
Pos	Team	Pld	W	D	L	GF	GA	GD	Pts	Qualification or relegation
1	Oțelul Galați (C)	34	21	7	6	46	25	+21	70	Qualification to Champions League group stage
2	Politehnica Timișoara (R)	34	17	15	2	63	38	+25	66	Relegation to Liga II (Note: Timișoara and Gloria Bistrița were denied a licence for the 2011–12 season because of accumulated debt and were therefore relegated to Liga II. Sportul Studențesc as the only team from the relegated sides holding a Liga I licence were hence spared from relegation.)
3	Vaslui	34	18	11	5	51	28	+23	65	Qualification to Champions League third qualifying round
4	Rapid București	34	16	11	7	43	22	+21	59	Qualification to Europa League play-off round
5	Steaua București	34	16	9	9	44	27	+17	57	Qualification to Europa League play-off round (Note: Steaua București won the 2010–11 Cupa României competition and therefore qualified for the play-off round of the 2011–12 UEFA Europa League.)

Source: LPF (in Romanian)
Rules for classification: 1st points; 2nd head-to-head points; 3rd head-to-head goal difference; 4th head-to-head goals scored; 5th overall goal difference; 6th overall goals scored
(C) Champions; (R) Relegated

==== Results summary ====
Overall								Home						Away					
Pld	W	D	L	GF	GA	GD	Pts	W	D	L	GF	GA	GD	W	D	L	GF	GA	GD
34	17	15	2	63	38	+25	66	11	6	0	37	17	+20	6	9	2	26	21	+5

Last updated: 09:41, 3 June 2010 (UTC).
Source: FCPT (in Romanian)

==== Results by round ====
Round	1	2	3	4	5	6	7	8	9	10	11	12	13	14	15	16	17	18	19	20	21	22	23	24	25	26	27	28	29	30	31	32	33	34
Ground	H	A	H	A	H	A	A	H	A	H	A	H	A	H	A	H	A	A	H	A	H	A	H	H	A	H	A	H	A	H	A	H	A	H
Result	D	D	W	D	W	D	D	W	W	W	W	D	D	W	D	W	D	D	W	W	W	W	D	D	W	D	L	D	W	W	D	W	L	W
Position	7	8	7	6	5	6	7	6	3	2	2	2	2	2	2	2	2	2	2	2	2	2	2	2	2	1	2	2	1	1	2	2	2	2

Updated to match(es) played on 09:41, 3 June 2010 (UTC). Source: Matches
A = Away; H = Home; W = Win; D = Draw; L = Loss

==== Results ====
Kick off times are in EET and EEST.

24 July 2010 Round 1	FC Timișoara	2–2	Gloria Bistriţa	Timișoara
20:30	Goga 10'; Magera 73'	Report	Mureşan 19'; Coroian 70'(pen.)	Stadium: Dan Păltinişanu; Attendance: 5.000; Referee: Sebastian Colţescu

1 August 2010 Round 2	Gaz Metan Mediaş	2–2	FC Timișoara	Sibiu
17:00	Eric 16'(pen) 49'	Report	Magera 72'; Axente 91'	Stadium: Municipal; Attendance: 4.000; Referee: Ovidiu Haţegan

8 August 2010 Round 3	FC Timișoara	3–2	CFR Cluj	Timișoara
20:00	Curtean 30' 61'; Axente 38'	Report	Bjelanović 27'; Koné 92'	Stadium: Dan Păltinişanu; Attendance: 20.000; Referee: Alexandru Deaconu

16 August 2010 Round 4	Universitatea Craiova	1–1	FC Timișoara	Craiova
22:00	Piţurcă 52'	Report	Zicu 91'	Stadium: Ion Oblemenco; Attendance: 18.000; Referee: Augustus Constantin

22 August 2010 Round 5	FC Timișoara	2–1	Victoria Brăneşti	Timișoara
22:00	Magera 39'; Zicu 82'	Report	Negru 81'	Stadium: Dan Păltinişanu; Attendance: 3.000; Referee: Robert Dumitru

29 August 2010 Round 6	Steaua București	1–1	FC Timișoara	Bucharest
20:00	Păcurar 51'	Report	Contra 80'	Stadium: Ghencea; Attendance: 16.000; Referee: Cristian Balaj

12 September 2010 Round 7	Astra Ploiești	1–1	FC Timișoara	Ploiești
19:00	Fatai 56'	Report	Hélder 75'	Stadium: Stadionul Astra; Attendance: 2.000; Referee: Alexandru Tudor

18 September 2010 Round 8	FC Timișoara	2–1	Sportul Studenţesc	Timișoara
21:00	Scutaru 29' 72'	Report	Patriche 15'	Stadium: Dan Păltinişanu; Attendance: 3.000; Referee: Mugurel Drăgănescu

26 September 2010 Round 9	Pandurii Târgu Jiu	0–1	FC Timișoara	Târgu Jiu
18:30		Report	Axente 41'	Stadium: Tudor Vladimirescu; Attendance: 3.000; Referee: Teodor Crăciunescu

2 October 2010 Round 10	FC Timișoara	2–1	Rapid București	Timișoara
20:30	Zicu 28' 86'	Report	Césinha 25'	Stadium: Dan Păltinişanu; Attendance: 15.000; Referee: Marius Avram

16 October 2010 Round 11	FCM Târgu Mureş	2–3	FC Timișoara	Târgu Mureş
15:00	Stere 2'; Munteanu 28'	Report	Zicu 19' 81'; Chiacu 51'	Stadium: Trans-Sil; Attendance: 5.000; Referee: Cristian Balaj

22 October 2010 Round 12	FC Timișoara	2–2	Universitatea Cluj	Timișoara
18:30	Axente 4'; Zicu 68'	Report	Szilágyi 11'; Machado 28'	Stadium: Dan Păltinişanu; Attendance: 8.000; Referee: Alexandru Deaconu

31 October 2010 Round 13	FC Brașov	0–0	FC Timișoara	Brașov
21:30		Report		Stadium: Tineretului; Attendance: 2.000; Referee: Alexandru Tudor

6 November 2010 Round 14	FC Timișoara	2–1	FC Vaslui	Timișoara
20:30	Zicu 45+2' (pen.); Goga 69'	Report	Papp 32'	Stadium: Dan Păltinişanu; Attendance: 12.000; Referee: Marius Avram

13 November 2010 Round 15	Unirea Urziceni	1–1	FC Timișoara	Urziceni
17:00	Todoran 80'	Report	Popovici 55'	Stadium: Tineretului; Attendance: 1.000; Referee: Dragoş Istrate

21 November 2010 Round 16	FC Timișoara	2–0	Oţelul Galaţi	Timișoara
20:30	Čišovský 75'; Nikolić 76'	Report		Stadium: Dan Păltinişanu; Attendance: 18,000; Referee: Ovidiu Haţegan

27 November 2010 Round 17	Dinamo București	0–0	FC Timișoara	Bucharest
21:45		Report		Stadium: Ştefan cel Mare; Attendance: 6,000; Referee: Robert Dumitru

4 December 2010 Round 18	Gloria Bistriţa	3–3	FC Timișoara	Bistriţa
18:00	Velcovici 53'; Keita 72' 90'	Report	Luchin 14'; Zicu 50'; Axente 67'	Stadium: Gloria Stadium; Attendance: 2,000; Referee: Istvan Kovacs

26 February 2011 Round 19	FC Timișoara	3–1	Gaz Metan Mediaş	Timișoara
19:00	Goga 55'; Zicu 62' 76'	Report	Dudiţă 49'	Stadium: Dan Păltinişanu; Attendance: 5,000; Referee: Robert Dumitru

5 March 2011 Round 20	CFR Cluj	1–2	FC Timișoara	Cluj
19:00	Cadú 8' (pen)	Report	Zicu 6' (pen); Ricketts 78'	Stadium: Dr. Constantin Rădulescu; Attendance: 11,000; Referee: Marius Avram

13 March 2011 Round 21	FC Timișoara	4–0	Universitatea Craiova	Timișoara
18:00	Zicu 36'; Magera 40' 55'; Goga 90+1'	Report		Stadium: Dan Păltinişanu; Attendance: 25,000; Referee: Florin Marcu

18 March 2011 Round 22	Victoria Brăneşti	0–2	FC Timișoara	Buzău
18:30		Report	Zicu 45+2' (pen); Goga 84'	Stadium: Crâng Stadium; Attendance: 2,000; Referee: Sebastian Colţescu

2 April 2011 Round 23	FC Timișoara	0–0	Steaua București	Timișoara
19:30		Report		Stadium: Dan Păltinişanu; Attendance: 33,000; Referee: Cristian Balaj

6 April 2011 Round 24	FC Timișoara	2–2	Astra Ploiești	Timișoara
16:00	Zicu 72' (pen); Zăgrean 80'	Report	Miranda 17'; N'Doye 64' (pen)	Stadium: Dan Păltinişanu; Attendance: 7,000; Referee: Georgian Ionescu

10 April 2011 Round 25	Sportul Studenţesc	2–3	FC Timișoara	Bucharest
17:00	Ferfelea 4'; Bălan 78'	Report	Zăgrean 30' 45'; Goga 90+3'	Stadium: Regie Stadium; Attendance: 4,000; Referee: Teodor Crăciunescu

13 April 2011 Round 26	FC Timișoara	2–2	Pandurii Târgu Jiu	Timișoara
19:30	Magera 26'; Zicu 90'	Report	Vranješ 38'; Lemnaru 47'	Stadium: Dan Păltinişanu; Attendance: 5,000; Referee: Sebastian Colţescu

17 April 2011 Round 27	Rapid București	3–2	FC Timișoara	Bucharest
21:30	Božović 11'; Roman 33'; Pancu 60'	Report	Zicu 19'; Alexa 85'	Stadium: Giuleşti-Valentin Stănescu; Attendance: 9,000; Referee: Alexandru Tudor

23 April 2011 Round 28	FC Timișoara	0–0	FCM Târgu Mureş	Timișoara
17:00		Report		Stadium: Dan Păltinişanu; Attendance: 13,000; Referee: Alexandru Deaconu

27 April 2011 Round 29	Universitatea Cluj	1–2	FC Timișoara	Mediaş
21:00	Niculescu 59'	Report	Alexa 22'; Ignjatijević 44'	Stadium: Gaz Metan; Attendance: 4,000; Referee: Paul Unimatan

30 April 2011 Round 30	FC Timișoara	2–0	FC Brașov	Timișoara
21:30	Bourceanu 32'; Goga 62'	Report		Stadium: Dan Păltinişanu; Attendance: 9,000; Referee: Alexandru Tudor

5 May 2011 Round 31	FC Vaslui	1–1	FC Timișoara	Vaslui
19:30	Alexa 65' (o.g.)	Report	Goga 73'	Stadium: Municipal; Attendance: 11,000; Referee: Alexandru Deaconu

9 May 2011 Round 32	FC Timișoara	3–1	Unirea Urziceni	Timișoara
18:00	Magera 12'; Čišovský 18'; Zăgrean 76'	Report	Čišovský 25' (o.g.)	Stadium: Dan Păltinişanu; Attendance: 10,000; Referee: Dragoş Istrate

15 May 2011 Round 33	Oţelul Galaţi	2–1	FC Timișoara	Galaţi
20:00	Antal 15'; Pena 72'	Report	Zicu 53'	Stadium: Oţelul; Attendance: 13,500; Referee: Robert Dumitru

21 May 2011 Round 34	FC Timișoara	4–1	Dinamo București	Timișoara
17:00	Luchin 14'; Nikolić 38' 59'; Ignjatijević 78'	Report	Ţucudean 27'	Stadium: Dan Păltinişanu; Attendance: 18,000; Referee: Ovidiu Haţegan

=== UEFA Europa League ===
==== Results ====
29 July 2010 Third qualifying round, 1st leg	MyPA (Finland)	1–2	(Romania) FC Timișoara	Kouvola
19:00	Ricketts 50'	Report	Tameş 34'; Axente 74'	Stadium: Saviniemi; Attendance: 3.500; Referee: David Mckeon

5 August 2010 Third qualifying round, 2nd leg	FC Timișoara (Romania)	3–3	(Finland) MyPA	Timișoara
20:30	Axente 53'; Zicu 80'; Čišovský 90+3'	Report	Äijälä 18'; Ricketts 20' 25'	Stadium: Dan Păltinişanu; Attendance: 10.000; Referee: Artyom Kuchin

19 August 2010 Play-off round, 1st leg	FC Timișoara (Romania)	0–1	(England) Manchester City	Timișoara
22:00		Report	Balotelli 72'	Stadium: Dan Păltinişanu; Attendance: 28.000; Referee: Florian Meyer

26 August 2010 Play-off round, 2nd leg	Manchester City (England)	2–0	(Romania) FC Timișoara	Manchester
20:45	Wright-Phillips 43'; Boyata 59'	Report		Stadium: City of Manchester Stadium; Attendance: 23,542; Referee: Manuel De Sousa

=== Cupa României ===
==== Results ====
22 September 2010 Round of 32	Juventus București	1–3	FC Timișoara	Bucharest
16:00	Nica 74'	Report	Mansour 21'; Tameş 34'; Goga 51'	Stadium: Juventus Stadium; Attendance: 7.500; Referee: Andrei Chivulete

27 October 2010 Round of 16	FC Timișoara	1–1 (4–3 p)	Voinţa Sibiu	Timișoara
18:30	Goga 13'	Report	Bunea 88'	Stadium: Dan Păltinişanu; Attendance: 1.000; Referee: Marian Balaci
	Penalties
	Sepsi (penalty scored); Zicu (penalty scored); Tameş (penalty scored); Scutaru (penalty missed); Magera (penalty scored)		(penalty scored) Grigore; (penalty scored) Beza; (penalty missed) Burlacu; (penalty missed) Hardău; (penalty scored) Popa

10 November 2010 Quarterfinals	FC Brașov	1–0	FC Timișoara	Brașov
17:00	Cristescu 90+3'	Report		Stadium: Silviu Ploeşteanu; Attendance: 2,000; Referee: Alexandru Deaconu

=== Non-competitive matches ===
25 June 2010 1st friendly	FC Timișoara	0–0	(Slovenia) NK Maribor	Maribor
19:30		FCPT		Stadium: Ljudski vrt Attendance: 250; Referee: Unknown

29 June 2010 2nd friendly	FC Timișoara	10–0	(Slovenia) NK Paloma	Slatki Vrh
19:30	Tameş 16', 34', 38'; Poparadu 48', 65'; Axente 63'; Mansour 67'; Mera 77'; Sandu 80', 84'	FCPT		Attendance: 150; Referee: Unknown

8 July 2010 3rd friendly	FC Timișoara	3–2	(Czech Republic) SC Znojmo	Bischofshofen
18:00	Alexa 27'; Axente 51'; Mera 72'	FCPT	Unknown 63'; Unknown 83'	Stadium: Unknown; Attendance: 100; Referee: Unknown

10 July 2010 4th friendly	FC Timișoara	15–0	(Austria) SK Bischofshofen	Bischofshofen
18:30	Vršič 14'; Curtean 38', 50', 56'; Goga 43', 46'; Axente 57', 60', 62', 87'; Magera 70', 76'; Contra 79' (pen.); Popovici 81'; Bourceanu 88'	FCPT		Stadium: Unknown; Attendance: 200; Referee: Unknown

13 July 2010 5th friendly	FC Timișoara	3–0	(Saudi Arabia) Al-Hilal	Mollbrucke
19:00	Goga 6'; Čišovský 51'; Bourceanu 77'	FCPT		Stadium: Lurnfeld Arena; Attendance: 200; Referee: Unknown

15 July 2010 6th friendly	FC Timișoara	2–1	(Hungary) Ferencváros	Groebning
19:00	Magera 66'; Axente 69'	FCPT	Heinz 79'	Stadium: Rennbahnstrasse; Attendance: 100; Referee: Unknown

16 January 2011 7th friendly	FC Timișoara	4–0	(Hungary) Bőcs	Debrecen
12:00	Ricketts 2' 33'; Goga 21'; Rato 83'	FCPT		Stadium: Unknown; Attendance: 50; Referee: Unknown

22 January 2011 8th friendly	FC Timișoara	0–0	(Switzerland) Young Boys	Marbella
17:00		FCPT		Stadium: Marbella Complexe Center; Attendance: 200; Referee: Unknown

25 January 2011 9th friendly	FC Timișoara	0–2	(Poland) Lech Poznań	Marbella
17:30		FCPT	Rudņevs 33'; Ubiparip 59'	Stadium: Marbella Complexe Center; Attendance: 200; Referee: Unknown

27 January 2011 10th friendly	FC Timișoara	3–1	(Poland) Arka Gdynia	Marbella
17:00	Popovici 18'; Pătraş 38'; Luchin 77'	FCPT	Ivanovski 49'	Stadium: Marbella Complexe Center; Attendance: 200; Referee: Unknown

30 January 2011 11th friendly	FC Timișoara	0–0	(Czech Republic) Sparta Prague	Marbella
17:00		FCPT		Stadium: Marbella Complexe Center; Attendance: 200; Referee: Unknown

2 February 2011 12th friendly	FC Timișoara	1–3	(Ukraine) Dnipro Dnipropetrovsk	Marbella
16:30	Zicu 9' (pen)	FCPT	Gladkiy 30' 63'; Nazarenko 37'	Stadium: Marbella Complexe Center; Attendance: 200; Referee: Unknown

8 February 2011 13th friendly	(Serbia) Banat Zrenjanin	1–0	FC Timișoara	Zrenjanin
14:00	Vukić 43'	FCPT		Stadium: Stadion Karađorđev park Attendance: 125; Referee: Unknown

==== Goal scorers ====
Nation	Name	Goals
(Romania)	Mircea Axente	7
(Romania)	Dorin Goga	4
(Romania)	Iulian Tameş	3
(Romania)	Alexandru Curtean	3
(Czech Republic)	Lukáš Magera	3
(Romania)	Adrian Poparadu	2
(Canada)	Tosaint Ricketts	2
(Romania)	Ioan Mera	2
(Romania)	Alexandru Bourceanu	2
(Senegal)	Gueye Mansour	1
(Slovenia)	Dare Vršič	1
(Romania)	Cosmin Contra	1
(Romania)	Alexandru Popovici	1
(Brazil)	Rafael Rocha	1

== Staff ==
=== Coaching staff ===
Position	Staff
Head Coach	Cosmin Contra
Assistant Coach	Iosif Rotariu
Assistant Coach2	Valentin Velcea
General Manager	Daniel Stanciu
Team Manager	Daniel Stanciu
Goalkeeping Coach	Marius Bratu
Fitness Coach	Michele Bon
Fitness Coach	Zeljko Boljevic
Medic	Teymour Ahmadi
Medic Assistant	Catalin Balan
Masseur	Adrian Rus
Masseur	Adrian Blaj
Masseur	Marius Cristescu
Masseur	Mihai Preda

Last updated: 09:41, 3 June 2010 (UTC)
Source: FCPT (in Romanian)

== See also ==
- FC Politehnica Timișoara
- 2011–12 FC Politehnica Timișoara season
- 2010–11 Liga I
- 2010–11 Cupa României
