= Rafael Rocha =

Rafael Rocha may refer to:

- Rafael Rocha (swimmer) (born 1956), Mexican swimmer
- Rafael Rocha (footballer) (born 1989), Brazilian footballer
