= László Sepsi =

Romanian footballer (born 1987)

Personal information
- Date of birth: 7 June 1987 (age 39)
- Place of birth: Luduș, Romania
- Height: 1.79 m (5 ft 10 in)
- Position: Left-back

Youth career
- Mureșul Luduș
- ȘS Târgu-Mureș
- Olimpia Satu Mare
- Sporting Pitești

Senior career*
| Years | Team | Apps | (Gls) |
| 2004–2005 | Gaz Metan Mediaș | 24 | (1) |
| 2005–2006 | Rennes | 0 | (0) |
| 2006–2007 | Gloria Bistrița | 45 | (0) |
| 2008–2010 | Benfica | 7 | (0) |
| 2008–2009 | → Racing Santander (loan) | 24 | (0) |
| 2010–2011 | Politehnica Timișoara | 56 | (1) |
| 2012 | Târgu Mureș | 14 | (0) |
| 2012–2014 | CFR Cluj | 23 | (0) |
| 2014 | → Târgu Mureș (loan) | 15 | (0) |
| 2014–2015 | Târgu Mureș | 30 | (0) |
| 2015–2018 | 1. FC Nürnberg | 47 | (0) |
| 2018–2019 | Universitatea Cluj | 24 | (0) |
| Total | | 309 | (2) |

International career
| 2005–2008 | Romania U21 | 13 | (0) |
| 2008–2015 | Romania | 4 | (0) |
- * Club domestic league appearances and goals

László Sepsi (Hungarian pronunciation: [ˈlaːsloː ˈʃɛpʃi]; born 7 June 1987) is a Romanian former professional footballer who played as a left-back.

== Club career ==
=== Gaz Metan Mediaș and Rennes ===
Sepsi was born on 7 June 1987 in Luduș, Romania, being of Hungarian descent, and began playing junior-level football at local club Mureșul, going afterwards to ȘS Târgu-Mureș, Olimpia Satu Mare and Sporting Pitești. He made his professional debut during the 2004–05 Divizia B season under the guidance of coach Ioan Sabău at Gaz Metan Mediaș. He made 24 appearances and scored once, as the team fought for promotion until the last round but finished in second place on equal points with Jiul Petroșani, which promoted on a better goal average.

In 2005 he moved abroad, signing for Rennes, being brought to the French club by compatriot László Bölöni, the team's manager. Sepsi did not feature in any Ligue 1 matches in the 2005–06 season, only being fielded in a couple of games for the Coupe de France. He also made his debut in a European competition, playing in a 5–1 away loss to PAOK in the 2005–06 UEFA Cup group stage.

=== Gloria Bistrița ===
Afterwards he returned to Romania, joining Gloria Bistrița which paid €200,000 for his transfer. There, he reunited with coach Sabău who gave him his Divizia A debut on 28 July 2006 in a 1–0 away loss to Ceahlăul Piatra Neamț. In his first season with Gloria, he helped the team finish in sixth position. The club reached the 2007 Intertoto Cup final where they earned a 2–1 home victory against Atlético Madrid, but the second leg was lost with 1–0, thus losing the final on the away goals rule.

=== Benfica and Racing Santander ===
On 12 January 2008, Sepsi signed a five-and-a-half-year contract with Portuguese club, Benfica for an undisclosed fee (newspapers reported a sum between €1.7 – 2.5 million). He made his Primeira Liga debut on 17 February when coach José Antonio Camacho sent him to replace Freddy Adu in the final minutes of a game against Naval, managing to provide an assist for a goal scored by Nuno Assis that secured a 2–0 win. He played three matches in the 2007–08 UEFA Cup campaign, helping The Eagles get past 1. FC Nürnberg and reach the round of 16 where he played in both legs of the 3–1 aggregate loss to Getafe.

In August 2008, Benfica loaned him to Spanish club Racing Santander in a season-long move. Sepsi made his La Liga debut on 31 August when coach Juan Ramón López Muñiz sent him in the 86th minute to replace Óscar Serrano in a 1–1 home draw against Sevilla. He played 19 games – 14 starts – as the Cantabrians finished in 12th position, thus retaining their division status. He also played four games in the 2008–09 UEFA Cup, helping Racing eliminate Honka in the first round and reach the group stage. Deemed surplus to requirements by new Benfica boss Jorge Jesus, Sepsi was again loaned to Racing Santander for the 2009–10 season. However, he appeared rarely in his second spell.

=== Politehnica Timișoara ===
On 4 January 2010, Sepsi joined Politehnica Timișoara for a fee believed to be between €1.2 – 1.5 million on a five-year deal. The club's president, Marian Iancu, revealed that the whole deal was worth €2.3 million, which included both the transfer fee and the player's wages. Sepsi reunited once again with coach Sabău, who, on 20 January 2010, gave him his debut in a 0–0 away draw against his former team Gloria Bistrița. He helped The White-Purples get past the third qualifying round of the 2010–11 Europa League against MyPa. The Finns were leading 3–0 at half time, but Politehnica made a comeback in the second half after Marián Čišovský equalized in the 90+2 minute. As they had won the first leg with 2–1, Politehnica reached the competition's play-offs, where they were eliminated by Manchester City. The team finished in second position in the 2010–11 championship. Despite this performance, Politehnica was relegated by the Romanian Football Federation to the second league for not fulfilling the license conditions to play in European competitions and first league. After spending the first half of the 2011–12 season in the second league, in January 2012, Sepsi was declared a free agent by the Court of Arbitration for Sport.

=== Târgu Mureș and CFR Cluj ===
He returned to first league football, playing in the second half of the 2011–12 season for Târgu Mureș, working again with Sabău, but the spell was unsuccessful as they were relegated.

In June 2012, after his contract expired, Sepsi signed with CFR Cluj for three seasons. He played four games in the 2012–13 Champions League group stage as CFR earned 10 points in a group composed of Manchester United, Galatasaray and Braga, which helped them finish third. Subsequently, they qualified for the round of 32 in the Europa League, where they were defeated by Inter Milan.

In February 2014, Sepsi was loaned by CFR back to Târgu Mureș, helping them earn promotion from the second league to the first. His transfer to Târgu Mureș subsequently became permanent. In the 2014–15 season, he helped Târgu Mureș fight for the title until the last round when they were defeated 2–1 by Oțelul Galați, thus finishing in second place, behind Steaua București.

=== 1. FC Nürnberg ===
In the summer of 2015, after extensive negotiations, Sepsi signed with 1. FC Nürnberg of Germany. He played 26 2. Bundesliga matches in his first season, also starting in both legs of the promotion/relegation play-offs that were lost 2–1 on aggregate to Eintracht Frankfurt.

In the 2016–17 campaign, Sepsi was sidelined for several weeks with an ankle injury. In June 2018, the club decided not to renew his expiring contract.

=== Universitatea Cluj ===
On 28 August 2018, aged 31, Sepsi returned to his homeland and joined second league side Universitatea Cluj. The team was close to earning a promotion to the first league as it finished third in the 2018–19 season, then played a promotion play-off against FC Hermannstadt which was lost with 3–0 on aggregate.

== International career ==
Sepsi played four games for Romania, making his debut on 26 March 2008 when coach Victor Pițurcă sent him in the 87th minute to replace Răzvan Raț in a 3–0 friendly victory against Russia, played at the Ghencea stadium in Bucharest. His following two games were also friendlies, a 2–0 loss to Israel and a 3–0 win over Honduras. Sepsi's last game for the national team was a 0–0 draw against Northern Ireland in the Euro 2016 qualifiers.

== Honours ==
Gloria Bistrița

- Intertoto Cup runner-up: 2007

Politehnica Timișoara

- Liga I runner-up: 2010–11
- Liga II: 2011–12

Târgu Mureș

- Liga I runner-up: 2014–15

== Career statistics ==
=== Club ===
Appearances and goals by club, season and competition
| Club | Season | League | | Cup | | Europe | | Other | | Total | |
| Club | Season | Apps | Goals | Apps | Goals | Apps | Goals | Apps | Goals | Apps | Goals |
|---|---|---|---|---|---|---|---|---|---|---|---|
| Gaz Metan | 2004–05 | 24 | 1 | 2 | 0 | – | | – | | 26 | 1 |
| Rennes | 2005–06 | 0 | 0 | 2 | 0 | 1 (Note: Appearances in the UEFA Cup) | 0 | – | | 3 | 0 |
| Gloria Bistrița | 2006–07 | 26 | 0 | 0 | 0 | – | | – | | 26 | 0 |
| Gloria Bistrița | 2007–08 | 19 | 0 | 1 | 0 | 6 (Note: Appearances in the UEFA Intertoto Cup) | 0 | – | | 26 | 0 |
| Gloria Bistrița | Total | 45 | 0 | 1 | 0 | 6 | 0 | 0 | 0 | 52 | 0 |
| Benfica | 2007–08 | 7 | 0 | 0 | 0 | 3 | 0 | – | | 10 | 0 |
| Racing Santander | 2008–09 | 19 | 0 | 3 | 0 | 4 | 0 | – | | 26 | 0 |
| Racing Santander | 2009–10 | 5 | 0 | 2 | 0 | – | | – | | 7 | 0 |
| Racing Santander | Total | 24 | 0 | 5 | 0 | 4 | 0 | 0 | 0 | 33 | 0 |
| Politehnica Timișoara | 2009–10 | 17 | 0 | 0 | 0 | – | | – | | 17 | 0 |
| Politehnica Timișoara | 2010–11 | 28 | 0 | 2 | 0 | 3 (Note: Appearances in the UEFA Europa League) | 0 | – | | 33 | 0 |
| Politehnica Timișoara | 2011–12 | 11 | 1 | 3 | 0 | – | | – | | 14 | 1 |
| Politehnica Timișoara | Total | 56 | 1 | 5 | 0 | 3 | 0 | 0 | 0 | 64 | 1 |
| Târgu Mureș | 2011–12 | 14 | 0 | 0 | 0 | – | | – | | 14 | 0 |
| CFR Cluj | 2012–13 | 18 | 0 | 3 | 0 | 6 (Note: Four appearances in the UEFA Champions League and two appearances in the UEFA Europa League) | 0 | – | | 27 | 0 |
| CFR Cluj | 2013–14 | 5 | 0 | 1 | 0 | – | | – | | 6 | 0 |
| CFR Cluj | Total | 23 | 0 | 4 | 0 | 6 | 0 | 0 | 0 | 33 | 0 |
| Târgu Mureș | 2013–14 | 15 | 0 | 0 | 0 | – | | – | | 15 | 0 |
| Târgu Mureș | 2014–15 | 30 | 0 | 2 | 0 | – | | – | | 32 | 0 |
| Târgu Mureș | Total | 45 | 0 | 2 | 0 | 0 | 0 | 0 | 0 | 47 | 0 |
| 1. FC Nürnberg | 2015–16 | 26 | 0 | 2 | 0 | – | | 2 (Note: Appearances in promotion/relegation play-offs) | 0 | 30 | 0 |
| 1. FC Nürnberg | 2016–17 | 18 | 0 | 2 | 0 | – | | – | | 20 | 0 |
| 1. FC Nürnberg | 2017–18 | 3 | 0 | 0 | 0 | – | | – | | 3 | 0 |
| 1. FC Nürnberg | Total | 47 | 0 | 4 | 0 | 0 | 0 | 2 | 0 | 53 | 0 |
| Universitatea Cluj | 2018–19 | 24 | 0 | 2 | 0 | – | | – | | 26 | 0 |
| Career total | | 309 | 2 | 27 | 0 | 23 | 0 | 2 | 0 | 361 | 2 |
