= Adrian Zaluschi =

Romanian footballer

Personal information
- Full name: Adrian Silviu Zaluschi
- Date of birth: 2 December 1989 (age 36)
- Place of birth: Timișoara, Romania
- Height: 1.79 m (5 ft 10 in)
- Position: Midfielder

Team information
- Current team: CSM Lugoj

Youth career
- –2008: Politehnica Timișoara

Senior career*
Years	Team	Apps	(Gls)
2008–2010	Politehnica II Timișoara		
2010–2012	Politehnica Timișoara	7	(0)
2011	→ ACU Arad (loan)	7	(0)
2012–2013	Millenium Giarmata		
2013–2014	UTA Arad	8	(1)
2015–2019	Ripensia Timișoara	93	(15)
2018	→ ACS Poli Timișoara (loan)	3	(0)
2020	Dunărea Călărași	11	(0)
2021	Minaur Baia Mare	8	(0)
2021–2023	ASU Politehnica Timișoara	24	(1)
2023–2024	Dumbrăvița	17	(1)
2024–	CSM Lugoj	0	(0)
- * Club domestic league appearances and goals as of 22 January 2024

Adrian Silviu Zaluschi (born 2 December 1989) is a Romanian professional footballer who plays as a midfielder for Liga IV club CSM Lugoj.

== Honours ==
Ripensia Timișoara

- Liga III: 2016–17
- Liga IV – Timiș County: 2015–16

Minaur Baia Mare

- Liga III: 2020–21
