= Florin Ilie =

Romanian footballer (born 1992)

Personal information
- Full name: Florin Ionuţ Ilie
- Date of birth: 18 June 1992 (age 34)
- Place of birth: Alba Iulia, Romania
- Height: 1.88 m (6 ft 2 in)
- Position: Centre-back

Team information
- Current team: Corvinul Hunedoara
- Number: 18

Youth career
- 2000–2010: Unirea Alba Iulia
- 2010–2011: Politehnica Timişoara

Senior career*
Years	Team	Apps	(Gls)
2011–2012	Politehnica Timişoara	25	(1)
2012–2013	Concordia Chiajna	14	(1)
2013–2014	Corona Braşov	5	(0)
2014	Gaz Metan Mediaș	1	(0)
2014–2015	Concordia Chiajna	1	(0)
2015–2016	FCM Baia Mare	33	(3)
2016	Luceafărul Oradea	14	(0)
2017	Pandurii Târgu Jiu	15	(1)
2017	ASA Târgu Mureș	5	(0)
2018	Mioveni	12	(0)
2018–2019	Sportul Snagov	32	(1)
2019–2022	UTA Arad	49	(1)
2022–2023	Universitatea Cluj	34	(3)
2023–2025	Politehnica Iași	45	(0)
2025	Unirea Alba Iulia		
2025–	Corvinul Hunedoara	37	(0)

International career
2009	Romania U17	3	(0)
2011	Romania U19	2	(0)
2011–2012	Romania U21	3	(0)
- * Club domestic league appearances and goals as of 17 October 2026

Florin Ionuţ Ilie (born 18 June 1992) is a Romanian professional footballer who plays as a centre-back for Liga I club Corvinul Hunedoara.

== Honours ==
Politehnica Timișoara

- Liga II: 2011–12

UTA Arad

- Liga II: 2019–20

Universitatea Cluj

- Cupa României runner-up: 2022–23

Corvinul Hunedoara

- Liga II: 2025–26
