= Mircea Ionuț Axente =

Romanian footballer

Mircea Axente
Personal information
- Full name: Mircea Ionuț Axente
- Date of birth: 14 March 1987 (age 39)
- Place of birth: Tulcea, Romania
- Height: 1.86 m (6 ft 1 in)
- Position: Forward

Youth career
- 2000–2004: LPS Galați
- 2004–2005: Politehnica Timișoara

Senior career*
| Years | Team | Apps | (Gls) |
| 2005–2012 | Politehnica Timișoara | 55 | (13) |
| 2006–2008 | Politehnica II Timișoara | 35 | (12) |
| 2005–2006 | → CFR Timișoara (loan) | | |
| 2007 | → FCM Reșița (loan) | 17 | (10) |
| 2008 | → CS Buftea (loan) | 17 | (9) |
| 2009 | → Gloria Buzău (loan) | 12 | (1) |
| 2009–2010 | → Oțelul Galați (loan) | 25 | (5) |
| 2012–2013 | Dinamo București | 14 | (4) |
| 2013–2014 | Viitorul Constanta | 27 | (7) |
| 2014 | Ermis Aradippou | 0 | (0) |
| 2014–2016 | ASA Târgu Mureș | 41 | (6) |
| 2016 | Maccabi Netanya | 9 | (0) |
| 2016–2017 | Gaz Metan Mediaș | 18 | (9) |
| 2017 | Al-Faisaly | 12 | (5) |
| 2018 | Botoșani | 16 | (3) |
| 2018–2019 | Dinamo București | 10 | (1) |
| 2019 | Universitatea Cluj | 11 | (3) |
| 2019–2021 | ASU Politehnica Timișoara | 57 | (10) |
| Total | | 376 | (98) |
- * Club domestic league appearances and goals

Mircea Axente (born 14 March 1987) is a Romanian former professional footballer who played as a forward for teams such as FC Politehnica Timișoara, Oțelul Galați, Dinamo București, ASA 2013 Târgu Mureș or SSU Politehnica Timișoara, among others.

== Career ==
=== Early career ===
Axente began his youth career at LPS Galați.

=== Politehnica Timișoara ===
He scored his first goal for FC Timişoara in the UEFA Europa League game in a 2–1 away win at MyPa. Just after few days after his goal in Europa League, he scored his first goal in Liga I for FC Timişoara in 91-minute against Gaz Metan Mediaş making 2–2. Again on 5 August 2010, he scored one goal in second leg against MyPa making 1–3 in a dramatic qualifier become an important man for Poli. He scored again against League Champions CFR Cluj in a 3–2 victory. At this moment, he had 12 goals in this season including Friendly Matches. On 26 September 2010, he scored the winning goal against Pandurii Târgu Jiu, ended 1–0.

=== FCM Reșița ===
The younger striker was loaned out at Reșița where impressed, scores 9 goals in 17 appearances. After scoring nine goals in the first half of the season, he was brought back to the club for the rest of the year.

=== CS Buftea ===
This time he was loaned to CS Buftea, who impressed again, scores 9 goals, but this time in 15 appearances.

=== Gloria Buzău ===
Now, he was loaned to first divisioner Gloria where scores at his debut against Oţelul Galaţi.

=== Oțelul Galați ===
He was loaned out again at Oțelul scores five goals, but three of this against his parent team, FC Timişoara. At the end of the season, finally he was promoted to first team at Timișoara.

=== Dinamo București ===
In the summer of 2012, Axente had his contract with Poli Timișoara ended by the Discipline Commission from the Romanian Federation, due to delays in the payments of his salary. Thus, he became a free agent, and signed a contract for four years with Dinamo București.

=== Viitorul Constanța ===
In the summer of 2013, Axente became free agent. Then, in August, he signed a contract with Liga I team Viitorul Constanta.

=== FC Dinamo București ===
In the summer of 2018, Axente became free agent. Then, after one month, he signed a contract with Liga I team FC Dinamo București. On 2 August 2018, Mircea Axente score in Derby Steaua-Dinamo. On 24 January 2019, the contract was terminated.

== Honours ==
Politehnica Timișoara

- Liga II: 2011–2012

Dinamo București

- Romanian Supercup: 2012

Ermis Aradippou

- Cypriot Super Cup: 2014

ASA Târgu Mureș

- Romanian Supercup: 2015
