= Ioan Mera =

Romanian footballer

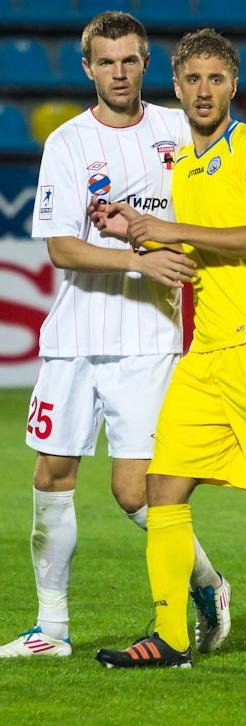
- Mera (left) with Alania in 2012

Personal information
- Date of birth: 5 January 1987 (age 39)
- Place of birth: Reghin, Romania
- Height: 1.94 m (6 ft 4 in)
- Position: Centre-back

Youth career
- –2002: Avântul Reghin
- 2002–2006: Politehnica Timișoara

Senior career*
Years	Team	Apps	(Gls)
2005–2012	Politehnica Timișoara	42	(6)
2006–2007	Politehnica II Timișoara	23	(0)
2005–2006	→ CFR Timișoara (loan)	11	(2)
2007–2008	→ FCM Reșița (loan)	16	(0)
2008	→ CS Buftea (loan)	15	(1)
2009	→ Gloria Buzău (loan)	15	(3)
2011	→ Unirea Urziceni (loan)	12	(0)
2012–2013	Alania Vladikavkaz	3	(0)
2013–2014	Săgeata Năvodari	8	(1)
2014	ACS Poli Timișoara	13	(0)
2014–2015	Rapid București	10	(0)
2015–2017	Taraz	55	(4)
2017–2022	ASU Politehnica Timișoara	136	(16)
2023–2025	Peciu Nou	40	(4)
Total		399	(37)

International career
2007–2008	Romania U21	6	(0)

Managerial career
- 2022–2023: ASU Politehnica Timișoara (sporting director)
- * Club domestic league appearances and goals

Ioan Mera (born 5 January 1987) is a Romanian former professional footballer who played as a centre-back.

== Club career ==
Mera began his youth career at Avântul Reghin and at 15 years old he was transferred at Poli.

=== Politehnica Timișoara ===
He signed in 2003, where he was still young, and he play for second team. He scored his first goal in Liga I match against Universitatea Craiova. Mera makes his European debut against Ajax Amsterdam in away match, score 0–0 .

=== Loans ===
Mera was loaned to CFR Timișoara for one year, making eleven appearances and scoring two goals. Next team where Mera was loaned out it was FCM Reșița where he played 16 matches. He was loaned out this time at CS Buftea with another 15 players from second team. He scored one goal in 15 appearances. Mera was loaned out at first divisioner Gloria Buzău where he scored three goals against Argeș Pitești, Gaz Metan Mediaș and FC Vaslui.

On 2 August 2012, Mera joined Russian Premier League side FC Alania Vladikavkaz on a three-year contract.

On 24 February 2014, Mera joined Liga I side ACS Poli Timișoara on a one-year contract.

On 19 January 2017, Mera joined Liga II side ASU Politehnica Timișoara on a free transfer.

== Honours ==
Politehnica Timișoara

- Liga II: 2011–12
