= 2009 Cupa României final =

- Event: Cupa României 2008–09
Politehnica Timişoara	CFR Cluj
Liga I	Liga I
0	3
- Date: 13 June 2009
- Venue: Stadionul Tudor Vladimirescu, Târgu Jiu
- Man of the Match: Emmanuel Culio (CFR Cluj)
- Referee: Cristian Balaj (Romania)
- Attendance: 9,000

The 2009 Cupa României final was the 71st final of Romania's most prestigious cup competition. The final was played at the Stadionul Tudor Vladimirescu in Târgu Jiu on 13 June 2009 and was contested between Liga I sides FC Timişoara and the defending champions CFR Cluj. The final whistle saw CFR Cluj winning the cup after a three goals to nill margin and also defending last season trophy.

== Route to the final ==
Politehnica Timişoara

Round of 32	CFR II Cluj	0–1	Politehnica Timişoara
Round of 16	Dunărea Galaţi	1–2	Politehnica Timişoara
Quarter-finals	Politehnica Timişoara	2–0	Gloria Bistriţa
Semi-finals	Dinamo București	1–4	Politehnica Timişoara

CFR Cluj

Round of 32	U Cluj	3–3 (aet, p. 10 – 11)	CFR Cluj
Round of 16	Sportul Studenţesc	0–1	CFR Cluj
Quarter-finals	CFR Cluj	1–0	Pandurii Târgu Jiu
Semi-finals	CFR Cluj	2–0	SC Vaslui

== Match details ==
13 June 2009
21:00 EEST

Politehnica Timişoara	0–3	CFR Cluj
	Report	Deac 7'; Peralta 29' (pen.); Culio 54'

Stadionul Tudor Vladimirescu, Târgu Jiu
Attendance: 9,000
Referee: Cristian Balaj (Romania)

POLITEHNICA TIMIŞOARA	CFR Cluj

POLITEHNICA TIMIŞOARA:
GK	29	(Romania) Costel Pantilimon
LB	3	(Romania) Iasmin Latovlevici
CM	5	(Romania) Dan Alexa (c)	(yellow card) 35'
CB	6	(Togo) Daré Nibombé		(substituted off) 76'
RM	7	(Romania) Stelian Stancu
CF	9	(Costa Rica) Winston Parks
LM	10	(Armenia) Artavazd Karamyan
CM	17	(Slovakia) Balázs Borbély	(yellow card) 37'	(substituted off) 58'
CF	18	(Romania) Gheorghe Bucur
CB	28	(Slovakia) Marián Čišovský	(yellow card) 76'
RB	30	(Romania) Valentin Badoi		(substituted off) 46'
Substitutes:
GK	99	(Portugal) Pedro Taborda
CF	8	(Slovenia) Dare Vršič		(substituted in) 58'
CF	11	(Armenia) Arman Karamyan		(substituted in) 46'
CB	16	(Romania) Srdjan Luchin		(substituted in) 76'
CM	20	(Romania) Florin Maxim
CF	27	(Czech Republic) Lukáš Magera
CM	31	(Nigeria) Abiodun Agunbiade
Manager:
(Romania) Valentin Velcea

CFR CLUJ:
GK	1	(Portugal) Nuno Claro
RB	2	(Portugal) Tony (c)
LB	4	(Romania) Cristian Panin
CB	6	(Romania) Gabriel Mureşan
CM	8	(Argentina) Sixto Peralta	(yellow card) 36'	(substituted off) 58'
CB	15	(Brazil) Hugo Alcântara
CF	17	(Burkina Faso) Yssouf Koné	(yellow card) 42'
CM	19	(Argentina) Emmanuel Culio	(yellow card) 54'
RM	23	(Romania) Bogdan Mara		(substituted off) 81'
DM	31	(Portugal) Dani
LM	77	(Romania) Ciprian Deac		(substituted off) 69'
Substitutes:
GK	44	(Romania) Eduard Stăncioiu
CM	7	(Argentina) Sebastián Dubarbier		(substituted in) 69'
CF	9	(Ivory Coast) Lacina Traoré
CD	16	(Uruguay) Darío Flores
CD	27	(Brazil) André Galiassi
LM	33	(Uruguay) Álvaro Pereira		(substituted in) 58'
CF	99	(Argentina) Diego Ruiz		(substituted in) 81'
Manager:
(Portugal) Toni

MATCH OFFICIALS

- Assistant referees:
  - (Romania) Cristian Nica
  - (Romania) Aurel Oniţa
- Fourth official:
  - (Romania) Marius Avram

MAN OF THE MATCH

- (Argentina) Emmanuel Culio

MATCH RULES

- 90 minutes.
- 30 minutes extra-time (15 minute intervals)
- Penalty shoot-out if scores level after extra time.
- Seven named substitutes
- Maximum of 3 substitutions.
