= Cristian Scutaru =

Romanian footballer

Personal information
- Full name: Cristian Dorel Scutaru
- Date of birth: 13 April 1987 (age 39)
- Place of birth: Reșița, Romania
- Height: 1.85 m (6 ft 1 in)
- Position: Defender

Team information
- Current team: Galaxy Timișoara (youth)

Youth career
- 1995–2003: CSM Reșița

Senior career*
Years	Team	Apps	(Gls)
2003–2004	CSM Reșița	12	(0)
2004–2005	Jiul Petroșani	1	(0)
2005–2012	Politehnica Timișoara	59	(4)
2005	→ CFR Timișoara (loan)	4	(0)
2007	→ FCM Reșița (loan)	11	(1)
2008	→ Buftea (loan)	22	(1)
2012–2013	Dinamo București	5	(0)
2013–2017	ACS Poli Timișoara	100	(3)
2017	UTA Arad	18	(1)
2018–2022	ASU Politehnica Timișoara	106	(2)
2022–2024	Peciu Nou	38	(8)
2024–2025	Dumbrăvița	23	(0)
Total		399	(20)

International career
2005–2007	Romania U19	3	(1)
2007–2008	Romania U21	9	(1)

Managerial career
- 2022–2023: ASU Politehnica Timișoara (youth)
- 2023–: Galaxy Timișoara (youth)
- * Club domestic league appearances and goals

Cristian Dorel Scutaru (born 13 April 1987) is a former Romanian professional footballer who played as a defender.

== Club career ==
=== Early career ===
Scutaru began his youth career at CSM Reșița. His former coach, Ioan Sdrobiș said that the young and solid defender is poised to become the next Chivu, whom he had also trained while still a youngster.

=== CSM Reșița ===
The younger defender plays for the first time for his hometown's CSM Reșița 12 matches .

=== Jiul Petroșani ===
After impress in just 12 matches at Reșița, Scutaru transferred to first divisioner Jiul Petroșani, but plays just one match.

=== Politehnica Timișoara ===
Scutaru was promoted by Gheorghe Hagi and made his debut during the Liga I 2005/2006 season against his former team Jiul Petroșani. Step by step, Scutaru became important man in first eleven. After chairman Marian Iancu appointed Vladimir Petrović as new coach, he reprofilate Scutaru as left defender. He scored his first goals for Poli in 2-1 won against Sportul Studențesc scoring twice.

=== CFR Timișoara ===
After appearing a number of times at CFR Timișoara (Poli's "B" team at the time) he was recalled to Poli.

=== FCM Reșița ===
He returned to hometown's FCM Reșița on loan making 11 appearances and scores one goal.

=== CS Buftea ===
Scutaru was loaned out to Buftea for six months time where was appointed the new captain of the team and plays 22 matches, and scored one goal.

=== Dinamo București ===
In the summer of 2012, Scutaru had his contract with Poli Timișoara ended by the Discipline Commission from the Romanian Federation, due to delays in the payments of his salary. Thus, he became a free agent, and signed a contract for five years with Dinamo București.

== International career ==
Scutaru is a former Romania U-19 and Romania U-21 international.

== Honours ==
Jiul Petroșani

- Divizia B: 2004–05

Politehnica Timișoara

- Cupa României runner-up: 2006–07, 2008–09
- Liga II: 2011–12

Dinamo București

- Supercupa României: 2012

ACS Poli Timișoara

- Liga II: 2014–15
- Cupa Ligii runner-up: 2016–17

Peciu Nou

- Liga IV – Timiș County: 2022–23
