= Tosaint Ricketts =

Canadian soccer player (born 1987)

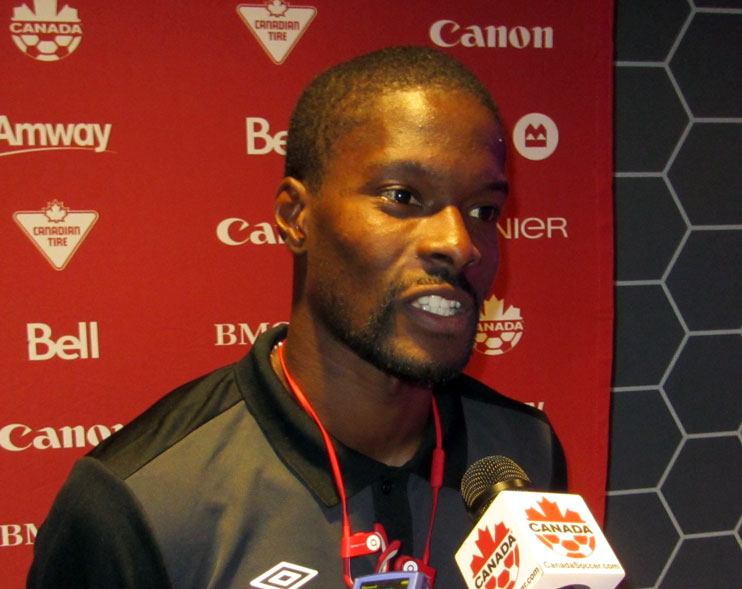
- Ricketts in 2015

Personal information
- Full name: Tosaint Antony Ricketts
- Date of birth: 6 August 1987 (age 39)
- Place of birth: Edmonton, Alberta, Canada
- Height: 1.83 m (6 ft 0 in)
- Position: Forward

Youth career
- Edmonton SW Sting
- Edmonton Juventus
- St. Francis Xavier High School

College career
Years	Team	Apps	(Gls)
2005–2008	Green Bay Phoenix	77	(26)

Senior career*
Years	Team	Apps	(Gls)
2009–2010	MyPa	40	(9)
2010–2012	Politehnica Timișoara	24	(6)
2012	Vålerenga	3	(1)
2013	Sandnes Ulf	12	(0)
2013–2014	Bucaspor	25	(7)
2014–2015	Hapoel Haifa	30	(1)
2015–2016	Boluspor	15	(1)
2016–2018	Toronto FC	51	(13)
2019	Sūduva	15	(8)
2019–2022	Vancouver Whitecaps FC	61	(7)
Total		276	(53)

International career
2007	Canada U20	8	(5)
2008	Canada U23	5	(2)
2011–2020	Canada	61	(17)
- * Club domestic league appearances and goals

Tosaint Antony Ricketts (born 6 August 1987) is a Canadian former professional soccer player who played as a forward.

== Club career ==
=== Early career ===
Ricketts was one of the top short-distance runners in Alberta, and he began his youth career playing Division I soccer for the Green Bay Phoenix at University of Wisconsin Green Bay.

=== MyPa ===
Ricketts joined Veikkausliiga club MyPa in 2009. He made his debut on 4 March 2009 and scored his first goal against Kuopion Palloseura on 13 June. He scored three goals in the Europa League against Politehnica Timișoara who became interested in signing him.

=== Politehnica Timișoara ===
On 19 November 2010 Ricketts signed with Romanian club Politehnica Timișoara for three years. At his presentation at the press conference, he said: "I'm glad I signed with Poli, to me is a step forward in my career. I can't wait to play at my new team and I can't wait to reunite "Poli" fans, which impressed me when I played here in Europa League with MyPa-47". He chose the number 87. On 26 February 2011, Ricketts made his debut for Politehnica Timișoara at Dan Păltinişanu in a 3–1 win against Gaz Metan Mediaş. He played twenty minutes in the match after replacing injured Marián Čišovský. Ricketts scored his first goal for Politehnica Timișoara on 5 March 2011 against CFR Cluj. He scored the winning goal in the 78th minute. Politehnica Timișoara was bankrupted in the summer of 2012, and Ricketts was released from his contract.

=== Vålerenga ===
On 31 August 2012, it was announced that Ricketts had signed for Vålerenga in the Norwegian Tippeligaen on a free transfer, he would be joining fellow Canadian international Lars Hirschfeld at the club. Ricketts made his debut in Norway as a second half sub for Torgeir Børven in a 1–0 defeat to Sogndal on 5 November 2012.

=== Sandnes Ulf ===
In early January 2013 it was announced that Ricketts had signed with Sandnes Ulf allowing him to remain in the Tippeligaen. He made his debut for the club on 17 March in a 2–0 defeat to Strømsgodset. Ricketts played a total of 12 matches in Tippeligaen until he left Sandnes Ulf in September 2013, he also scored two goals for the club in the Norwegian Cup.

=== Bucaspor ===
On 6 September 2013, Ricketts signed for Turkish First League club Bucaspor, a one-year contract with a one-year option. He scored his first two goals for the team in a 5–4 loss to Adana Demirspor on 22 September 2013.

=== Hapoel Haifa ===
On 16 July 2014, Ricketts announced on Twitter he had signed for Israeli Premier League club Hapoel Haifa. He debuted with the side on 16 August 2014 in a Toto Cup match against Bnei Sakhnin, and scored a goal in an eventual 2–2 draw. He scored his first league goal against Beitar Jerusalem in a loss on 9 February 2015. In total, Ricketts made 30 appearances for the club, scoring a single goal. His lack of offensive production at the club can be attributed to being used as a defender for the entire season because of personnel issues on the roster.

=== Boluspor ===
After one season in Israel, Ricketts returned to Turkey and signed with Boluspor on 3 August 2015. Ricketts left Boluspor in early 2016 after a dispute over unpaid wages.

=== Toronto FC ===
On 20 July 2016, Ricketts returned to Canada to join Major League Soccer side Toronto FC. He made his debut from the bench in a 4–1 win against D.C. United, and scored his first goal in his next appearance: a 1–0 victory against Real Salt Lake City. He missed three games in the final weeks of the season due to a groin injury and indirect suspension.

In February 2017, Ricketts signed a two-year extension. On 13 May 2017, Ricketts scored a late brace in a 2–1 win at the Columbus Crew. The following game marked his first full 90 minutes for Toronto after 28 appearances, and he scored the final goal in a 3–2 victory at Minnesota United. In June, an injury sustained in the Canadian Championship semi-final second leg win against the Ottawa Fury kept him out for four matches.

At the conclusion of the 2018 season, Toronto declined the 2019 contract option on Ricketts.

=== Sūduva ===
On 26 January 2019, Ricketts signed with defending Lithuanian A Lyga champions Sūduva. He scored a total of 10 goals for the club in the 2019 season, including a memorable goal in the 1–0 victory against Kauno Žalgiris on 16 March, which he dedicated to victims of terrorism following the Christchurch mosque shootings. Ricketts also earned five inclusions in the A Lyga Team of the Week. His final appearance for the club was during the UEFA Europa League second qualifying round, a 5–0 home victory against Tre Penne. Ricketts left Sūduva the following week after club's away victory in the Europa League third qualifying round game for a return to MLS.

=== Vancouver Whitecaps FC ===
On 8 August 2019, Ricketts returned to MLS and Canada, joining Vancouver Whitecaps FC. He was re-signed to a new deal through 2022, with an option for 2023 in March 2022. At the end of the 2022 season, Vancouver announced they would not exercise the option on Ricketts' contract for 2023, ending his playing time with the club. Ricketts would continue in the front office as Manager of Community Impact

On January 31, 2023, Ricketts announced his retirement from soccer, joining the Whitecaps staff as liaison of club and player engagement.

== International career ==
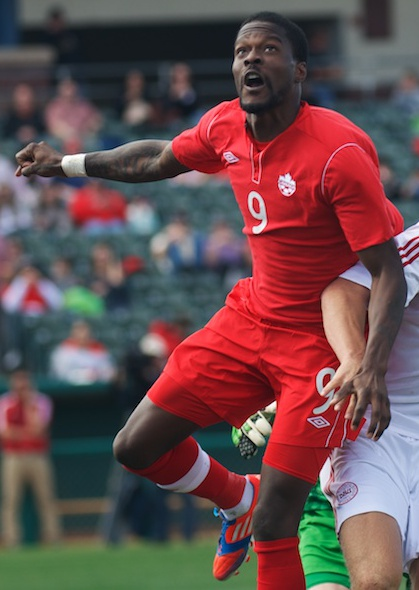
Ricketts playing for Canada in 2013

In 2007 Ricketts was called up to the Canadian U-20 team for the 2007 FIFA U-20 World Cup held on home soil. He also made appearances for Canada in the 2008 CONCACAF Men's Pre-Olympic Tournament in which he scored twice against Guatemala.

In late January 2011, Ricketts was called up by Canada for the first time ahead of its international friendly against Greece on 9 February. Ricketts made his senior team debut for Canada as a late second half sub in this game which ended as a 1–0 loss. Ricketts was one of three Canadian players to make their international senior debut against Greece; Milan Borjan and David Edgar were the other two.

On 1 June 2011, Ricketts scored his first international goal, a stoppage time equalizer, in a 2–2 friendly match against Ecuador at BMO Field. Ricketts made his CONCACAF Gold Cup debut on 14 June in a 1–1 draw against Panama as a second half sub for Josh Simpson.

Ricketts continued his goal scoring form in World Cup Qualifying during his first ever start for the national team on 15 November 2011 during a 4–0 home victory over Saint Kitts and Nevis. Ricketts reached 10 goals for Canada on 16 June 2015 after scoring a brace against Dominica in 2018 FIFA World Cup qualifying. This tied him with Paul Peschisolido and Tomasz Radzinski for 9th all time on Canada's scoring charts.

Ricketts was named to the 2017 CONCACAF Gold Cup squad on 27 June 2017.

== Style of play ==
A fast striker, Ricketts is mainly known for his pace. His former Toronto FC manager Greg Vanney said of him in 2017: "He gives us presence, size, speed, a goal-scoring threat." Regarding his speed, movement, and work-rate, Vanney also added: "[Ricketts] is a relentless runner. A guy who will get behind defences. He's incredibly fast. He doesn't really need to run the line. He can give himself three, four lines of cushion and still make the runs in behind and still beat you to the spot." That same year, Neil Davidson of The National Post described him as the "fastest player on the Toronto roster," and also noted that "Ricketts’ speed unsettles defenders and he has an ability to find space in the penalty box. Get the ball to his feet or head and he can finish." Although normally a forward, he has also been deployed out of position in a more defensive role on occasion, often playing as a right–sided full-back or wing-back during his time with Israeli club Hapoel Haifa FC, due to injuries to other members of the squad in that position. He has also drawn praise in the media for his energy, presence in the air, and leadership, as well as his goalscoring rate, despite not being a particularly prolific player. Regarding his role on the pitch, Ricketts has commented: "I watch the tendencies of defenders, what spaces and weaknesses I can exploit and come second half I'm just waiting for any amount of time possible — if it's two, five, 15 minutes — to come on and provide that spark. It's just the mentality that comes along with the role I have." Throughout his career, he earned a reputation as a "super-sub."

== Career statistics ==
=== Club ===
As of match played 9 October 2022

Appearances and goals by club, season and competition
Club	Season	League			National Cup (Note: Includes Finnish Cup, Cupa României, Turkish Cup, Israel State Cup, Canadian Championship, Lithuanian Supercup & Lithuanian Football Cup matches.)		League Cup (Note: Includes Finnish League Cup, Toto Cup & MLS Cup Playoffs matches.)		Continental (Note: Includes UEFA Europa League, CONCACAF Champions League, Campeones Cup & UEFA Champions League matches.)		Total	
Club	Season	Division	Apps	Goals	Apps	Goals	Apps	Goals	Apps	Goals	Apps	Goals
MYPA	2009	Veikkausliiga	16	5	0	0	0	0	0	0	16	5
MYPA	2010	Veikkausliiga	24	4	1	0	6	1	5	5	36	10
MYPA	Total		40	9	1	0	6	1	5	5	52	15
Timișoara	2010–11	Liga I	9	1	0	0	0	0	0	0	9	1
Timișoara	2011–12	Liga II	15	5	3	1	0	0	0	0	18	6
Timișoara	Total		24	6	3	1	0	0	0	0	27	7
Vålerenga	2012	Tippeligaen	3	1	0	0	0	0	0	0	3	1
Sandnes Ulf	2013	Tippeligaen	12	0	0	0	0	0	0	0	12	0
Bucaspor	2013–14	TFF First League	25	7	3	2	0	0	0	0	28	9
Hapoel Haifa	2014–15	Israeli Premier League	30	1	1	0	5	2	0	0	36	3
Boluspor	2015–16	TFF First League	15	1	3	0	0	0	0	0	18	1
Toronto FC	2016	MLS	11	3	0	0	6	2	0	0	17	5
Toronto FC	2017	MLS	22	7	3	0	1	0	0	0	26	7
Toronto FC	2018	MLS	18	3	2	1	0	0	3	0	23	4
Toronto FC	Total		51	13	5	1	7	2	3	0	66	16
Sūduva	2019	A Lyga	15	8	2	1	0	0	3	1	20	10
Vancouver Whitecaps FC	2019	MLS	8	1	0	0	0	0	0	0	8	1
Vancouver Whitecaps FC	2020	MLS	16	2	0	0	0	0	0	0	16	2
Vancouver Whitecaps FC	2021	MLS	14	0	1	0	0	0	0	0	15	0
Vancouver Whitecaps FC	2022	MLS	22	4	3	0	0	0	0	0	26	4
Vancouver Whitecaps FC	Total		61	7	4	0	0	0	0	0	65	7
Career total			276	53	22	5	18	5	11	6	327	69

=== International ===
As of match played 16 January 2020

Appearances and goals by national team and year
National team	Year	Apps	Goals
Canada	2011	9	3
Canada	2012	9	2
Canada	2013	12	0
Canada	2014	5	2
Canada	2015	12	5
Canada	2016	7	2
Canada	2017	3	1
Canada	2018	2	1
Canada	2019	0	0
Canada	2020	2	1
Total		61	17

As of match played 7 January 2020
Scores and results list Canada's goal tally first, score column indicates score after each Ricketts goal.

List of international goals scored by Tosaint Ricketts
No.	Date	Venue	Cap	Opponent	Score	Result	Competition
1	1 June 2011	BMO Field, Toronto, Canada	3	Ecuador	2–2	2–2	Friendly
2	6 September 2011	Estadio Juan Ramón Loubriel, Bayamón, Puerto Rico	6	Puerto Rico	3–0	3–0	2014 FIFA World Cup qualification
3	15 November 2011	BMO Field, Toronto, Canada	9	Saint Kitts and Nevis	4–0	4–0	2014 FIFA World Cup qualification
4	15 August 2012	Central Broward Regional Park, Lauderhill, United States	14	Trinidad and Tobago	1–0	2–0	Friendly
5	12 October 2012	BMO Field, Toronto, Canada	17	Cuba	1–0	3–0	2014 FIFA World Cup qualification
6	27 May 2014	Stadion SVU Mauer, Mauer, Austria	32	Moldova	1–1	1–1	Friendly
7	9 September 2014	BMO Field, Toronto, Canada	33	Jamaica	3–1	3–1	Friendly
8	30 March 2015	Estadio Juan Ramón Loubriel, Bayamón, Puerto Rico	37	Puerto Rico	1–0	3–0	Friendly
9	16 June 2015	BMO Field, Toronto, Canada	39	Dominica	3–0	4–0	2018 FIFA World Cup qualification
10	16 June 2015	BMO Field, Toronto, Canada	39	Dominica	4–0	4–0	2018 FIFA World Cup qualification
11	4 September 2015	BMO Field, Toronto, Canada	43	Belize	1–0	3–0	2018 FIFA World Cup qualification
12	4 September 2015	BMO Field, Toronto, Canada	43	Belize	2–0	3–0	2018 FIFA World Cup qualification
13	6 October 2016	Stade de Marrakech, Marrakesh, Morocco	53	Mauritania	1–0	4–0	Friendly
14	6 October 2016	Stade de Marrakech, Marrakesh, Morocco	53	Mauritania	4–0	4–0	Friendly
15	22 January 2017	Bermuda National Stadium, Hamilton, Bermuda	55	Bermuda	2–1	4–2	Friendly
16	24 March 2018	Pinatar Arena, Murcia, Spain	58	New Zealand	1–0	1–0	Friendly
17	7 January 2020	Championship Soccer Stadium, Irvine, United States	60	Barbados	1–0	4–1	Friendly

== Honours ==
Toronto FC

- MLS Cup: 2017
- Canadian Championship: 2017, 2018
- Supporters' Shield: 2017

Sūduva

- A Lyga: 2019
- Lithuanian Cup: 2019
- Lithuanian Supercup: 2019

Vancouver Whitecaps FC

- Canadian Championship: 2022

== Personal life ==
In December 2023, the Vancouver Whitecaps signed Ricketts to represent the team in the eMLS at League Series 1, League Series 2 and eMLS Cup for the 2024 season. The move makes Ricketts the first former MLS player to complete in eMLS.
