= Rafael Rocha (footballer) =

Brazilian footballer

Rato
Personal information
- Full name: Carlos Rafael Rocha Ferreira
- Date of birth: 3 April 1989 (age 37)
- Place of birth: Ribeirão Preto, Brazil
- Height: 1.74 m (5 ft 9 in)
- Position: Left midfielder

Team information
- Current team: União de Rondonópolis

Youth career
- 2000–2007: Desportivo Brasil

Senior career*
Years	Team	Apps	(Gls)
2008–2009	Desportivo Brasil	15	(0)
2009	→ São Bento (loan)	13	(3)
2010	Botafogo	5	(0)
2010–2012	Politehnica Timişoara	19	(1)
2012	Concordia Chiajna	3	(0)
2016	Rio Branco	0	(0)
2016	Oeste	3	(0)
2017	Capivariano	0	(0)
2019–	União de Rondonópolis	7	(0)
- * Club domestic league appearances and goals as of 24 June 2020

Carlos Rafael Rocha Ferreira, sometimes known as Rafael Rocha or Rato (born 14 March 1989 in Ribeirão Preto) is a Brazilian professional football player who plays as a left midfielder for União de Rondonópolis.

== Club career ==
=== Early career ===
Rocha began his youth career at Desportivo Brasil. He later played at São Bento and Botafogo.

=== Politehnica Timișoara ===
In October 2010 Rafael Rocha signed with Politehnica Timişoara, being recommended there by Poli's defender, the Brazilian Hélder Maurílio. Rocha was presented together with Jiří Krejčí and he was handed the number 30. At the presentation, he said: "It's a unique opportunity for me. It's a great team and I want to meet the demands of that are here. Romanian football is very aggressive. I'll probably adjust harder, I hope the people here will have patience with me". He made his debut for Poli on the Dan Păltinişanu stadium on 26 February 2011 against Gaz Metan Mediaş, replacing Ianis Zicu in the 88th minute of the game.

== Honours ==
Politehnica Timișoara

- Liga II: 2011–12
