= Artur Pătraș =

Moldovan footballer

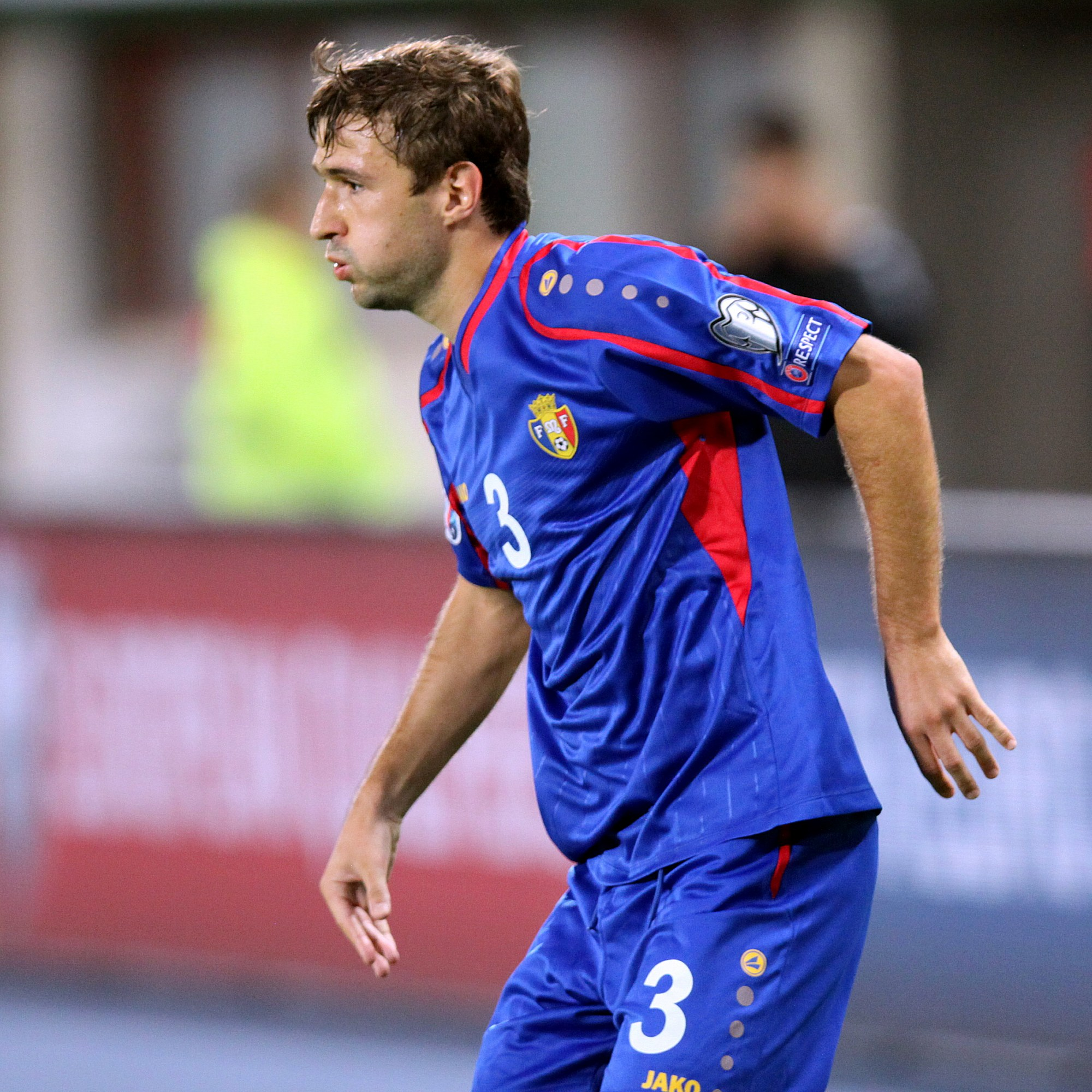
- Pătraș with Moldova in 2015

Personal information
- Full name: Artur Pătraș
- Date of birth: 1 October 1988 (age 38)
- Place of birth: Chișinău, Moldavian SSR, Soviet Union
- Height: 1.74 m (5 ft 9 in)
- Position: Midfielder

Team information
- Current team: Iskra Rîbnița
- Number: 8

Senior career*
Years	Team	Apps	(Gls)
2004–2005	Victoria Chișinău	15	(3)
2005–2007	Politehnica Chișinău	31	(4)
2007–2012	Politehnica Timișoara	24	(1)
2007–2008	→ Politehnica Timişoara II (loan)	41	(4)
2008	→ CS Buftea (loan)	9	(0)
2009	→ Gloria Buzău (loan)	2	(0)
2009	→ Oțelul Galați (loan)	9	(0)
2010	→ Concordia Chiajna (loan)	8	(1)
2011	→ Unirea Urziceni (loan)	8	(2)
2012	AZAL	7	(0)
2013	Academia Chișinău	10	(1)
2013–2016	Milsami Orhei	68	(9)
2016	Sheriff Tiraspol	11	(1)
2016–2017	Petrocub Hîncești	21	(5)
2017	Sfântul Gheorghe	18	(1)
2018	Petrocub Hîncești	26	(3)
2019	Milsami Orhei	12	(0)
2019	Zimbru Chișinău	11	(0)
2020	Speranța Nisporeni	1	(0)
2020–2022	Zimbru Chișinău	50	(14)
2022	Dacia Buiucani	13	(1)
2023–2024	SCM Zalău	19	(0)
2024–	Iskra Rîbnița		

International career^{‡}
2005	Moldova U17	11	(2)
2006	Moldova U19	13	(5)
2007–2009	Moldova U21	30	(7)
2011–2020	Moldova	29	(0)
- * Club domestic league appearances and goals as of 14:09, 24 November 2023 (UTC) ‡ National team caps and goals as of 2 April 2021

Artur Pătraș (born 1 October 1988) is a Moldovan footballer who plays as a midfielder for Moldovan Liga 1 club Iskra Rîbnița.

== Club career ==
In March 2007, he made his debut in the Romanian Liga I in a match against Dinamo București.

Pătraș joined Azerbaijan Premier League club AZAL in the summer of 2012, but in December he cancelled the contract.

== International career ==
Pătraș played 29 matches for the Moldova national team from 2011 to 2020. He made his international debut in a friendly match against Poland on 6 February 2011.

== Honours ==
Milsami Orhei

- Moldovan National Division: 2014–15
- Moldovan Super Cup: 2019

Sheriff Tiraspol

- Moldovan National Division: 2015–16
