= Dorin Goga =

Romanian footballer

Personal information
- Full name: Dorin Ioan Goga
- Date of birth: 2 July 1984 (age 42)
- Place of birth: Zalău, Romania
- Height: 1.82 m (6 ft 0 in)
- Position: Forward

Team information
- Current team: Sănătatea Cluj
- Number: 21

Youth career
- –2003: Universitatea Cluj

Senior career*
Years	Team	Apps	(Gls)
2003–2008	Universitatea Cluj	120	(33)
2008–2012	Politehnica Timișoara	92	(29)
2012	Rapid București	14	(2)
2013	Hapoel Ramat Gan	12	(1)
2013–2014	Dinamo Tbilisi	27	(9)
2014	Harbin Yiteng	0	(0)
2014–2015	ASA Târgu Mureș	26	(3)
2015–2016	Poli Timișoara	23	(7)
2016–2020	Universitatea Cluj	108	(74)
2021–	Sănătatea Cluj	50	(12)

International career^{‡}
2012	Romania	1	(0)
- * Club domestic league appearances and goals as of 11:02, 24 November 2023 (UTC) ‡ National team caps and goals as of 22 December 2013

Dorin Ioan Goga (born 2 July 1984) is a Romanian professional footballer who plays as a forward for Liga III side Sănătatea Cluj. In his career, Goga also played for teams such as Universitatea Cluj, Politehnica Timișoara or Dinamo Tbilisi, among others.

== Club career ==
=== Universitatea Cluj ===
Goga began his career at Universitatea Cluj, where he mainly played as winger at first. He was promoted to first team in the summer of 2003 when the club was playing in the Liga II. He scored a goal helping them achieve promotion to the Liga I, after several years of absence. While playing in the second league he had not received much attention, however, after several great games in a horrendous first half of the season for Universitatea, clubs like Politehnica Timișoara came forward and offered €1 million and 12 players in exchange for the forward's services. The offer was rejected, and Goga remained at the club until the end of the 2007–08 Liga I season. After that, he moved to Politehnica.

=== Politehnica Timișoara ===
On 2008, Goga signed with Politehnica Timișoara. He was their goalscorer in the Europa League, scoring two goals against Ajax and Dinamo Zagreb. On 22 September he scored one goal in a 3–1 victory in the Romanian Cup against Juventus București. After a disastrous start of the season, scoring only one goal in thirteen rounds, he scored the winning goal in the 69th minute in 2–1 victory against FC Vaslui. On 26 February 2011, Goga scored the equalizer against Gaz Metan Mediaş in a 3–1 win. It was his third goal in Liga 1 this season. Dorin scored a fantastic goal in a 4–0 demolition of Universitatea Craiova. He scored again against Victoria Brăneşti and it seems that Dušan Uhrin Jr. reinvent himself again.

On 1 July 2012, Dorin Goga signed with Rapid București. He was released in December when the club was entered under administration and the new president decided to part company with the players with big contracts.

Goga's first experience abroad came in Israel, where he signed a contract for five months with Hapoel Ramat Gan. On 29 July 2013, Goga signed a two-year contract with Georgian side Dinamo Tbilisi.

Goga transferred to Chinese Super League side Harbin Yiteng on 24 June 2014. However, he had his contract terminated by mutual consent on 14 July 2014, as his family didn't support him playing in China.

== International career ==
Goga made his international debut for Romania on 27 January 2012 in a friendly match against Turkmenistan, which Romania won 4–0.

== Honours ==
Universitatea Cluj

- Liga II: 2006–07
- Liga III: 2017–18
- Liga IV: 2016–17

FC Politehnica Timișoara

- Liga II: 2011–2012

Hapoel Ramat Gan

- Israel State Cup: 2012–13

Dinamo Tbilisi

- Umaglesi Liga: 2013–14
- Georgian Cup: 2013–14
