= Nikola Ignjatijević =

Serbian footballer

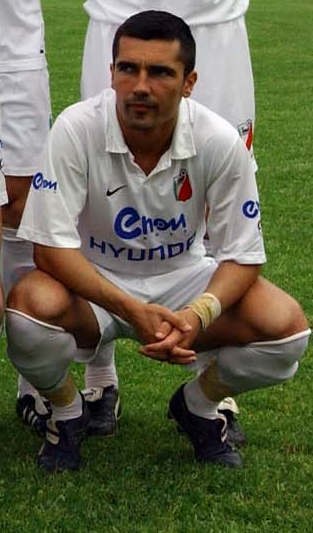
- Ignjatijević with Javor in 2008

Personal information
- Full name: Nikola Ignjatijević
- Date of birth: 12 December 1983 (age 42)
- Place of birth: Požarevac, SFR Yugoslavia
- Height: 1.75 m (5 ft 9 in)
- Position: Left-back

Youth career
- Red Star Belgrade

Senior career*
Years	Team	Apps	(Gls)
2002–2005	Jedinstvo Ub	81	(2)
2005–2006	Javor Ivanjica	26	(0)
2006–2007	Zemun	23	(1)
2007–2008	Napredak Kruševac	8	(0)
2008–2009	Javor Ivanjica	40	(1)
2009–2011	Red Star Belgrade	28	(2)
2011	→ Politehnica Timișoara (loan)	11	(2)
2012–2014	Zorya Luhansk	64	(0)
2015	Radnički Niš	5	(0)
2015	OFK Beograd	13	(1)
2016	Shakhtyor Soligorsk	22	(0)
2017	Borac Čačak	20	(0)
2018–2019	Rad	20	(0)
Total		361	(9)

Managerial career
- 2021–2022: Vršac (U19)
- 2023–2024: Javor Ivanjica (U19)
- 2024–: Mynai (assistant)
- * Club domestic league appearances and goals

Nikola Ignjatijević (Serbian Cyrillic: Никола Игњатијевић; born 12 December 1983) is a Serbian former footballer who played as left back.

== Club career ==
=== Red Star Belgrade ===
Nikola signed with his former youth club in 2009. On 16 July 2009 he made his European dream debut against NK Rudar Velenje. Red Star won 1-0 .On 15 August 2009 he made his SuperLiga debut for Red Star against FK Jagodina at Stadion FK Jagodina in 3-0 won. He assisted Slavko Perović on 12 December 2009, even on his birthday, in 5-2 won against FK Spartak Subotica. He scored his first goal for Red Star in 1–0 win against FK Jagodina on 27 February 2010. Ignjatijević scored again for Red Star next week against FK Rad in 2–1 away won. He scored the winning goal like last week.

==== Loan to Politehnica Timișoara ====
On 17 January 2011 Ignjatijević was loaned out at Romanian giants FC Politehnica Timișoara. He signed a contract until the summer with option to buy him from Red Star at end of the season. He was presented on press conference along his new-teammates Sergei Lepmets, Sorin Ghionea and Andrei Zăgrean and he said: "I came to a very ambitious club, very well organized, eager for success and in next 6 months we expect victories to win Liga 1". On 16 June 2011 his contract expired and he returned to Red Star Belgrade after making a good impression in Liga 1.

=== Zorya ===
In 2012, Red Star was in the process of rebuilding the entire team and Ignjatijević transferred to Zorya Luhansk. He immediately made an impact in the team, consistently having a spot in Zorya's starting XI.
