= Marian Fuchs =

Romanian footballer

Personal information
- Full name: Marian Cristian Fuchs
- Date of birth: 6 March 1992 (age 34)
- Place of birth: Moldova Nouă, Romania
- Height: 1.78 m (5 ft 10 in)
- Position: Midfielder

Team information
- Current team: Național Sebiș
- Number: 5

Senior career*
Years	Team	Apps	(Gls)
2010–2012	Politehnica Timișoara	14	(1)
2013–2014	Farul Constanţa	7	(0)
2014–2015	Millenium Giarmata		
2015–2016	Şoimii Pâncota	24	(0)
2016–	Național Sebiș		
- * Club domestic league appearances and goals as of 30 June 2016

Marian Cristian Fuchs (born 6 March 1992) is a Romanian football player who plays for Național Sebiș. He played in Liga I for Politehnica Timișoara.

A native of Moldova Nouă, Fuchs was discovered at a local youth tournament by Politehnica Timișoara manager Robert Frușa. His play as a central midfielder with the club's junior side earned the manager's comparison to Kaká.
