= Igor Popović =

Serbian footballer

Personal information
- Full name: Igor Popović
- Date of birth: 10 August 1983 (age 43)
- Place of birth: Subotica, SFR Yugoslavia
- Height: 1.85 m (6 ft 1 in)
- Position: Centre back

Senior career*
Years	Team	Apps	(Gls)
2001–2010	Spartak Subotica	128	(8)
2005–2006	→ Smederevo (loan)	11	(0)
2006–2007	→ Voždovac (loan)	19	(0)
2007	→ Siófok (loan)	6	(0)
2010	Politehnica Timișoara	0	(0)
2010	OFK Beograd	8	(0)
2011	Napredak Kruševac		
2013-2014	Dinamo Pančevo		
- * Club domestic league appearances and goals

Igor Popović (Serbian Cyrillic: Игор Поповић; born 10 August 1983) is a Serbian footballer.

== Career ==
He signed a contract with Poli in the summer of 2010, but the contract was mutually terminated and he became a free agent.
