= Sergei Lepmets =

Estonian footballer

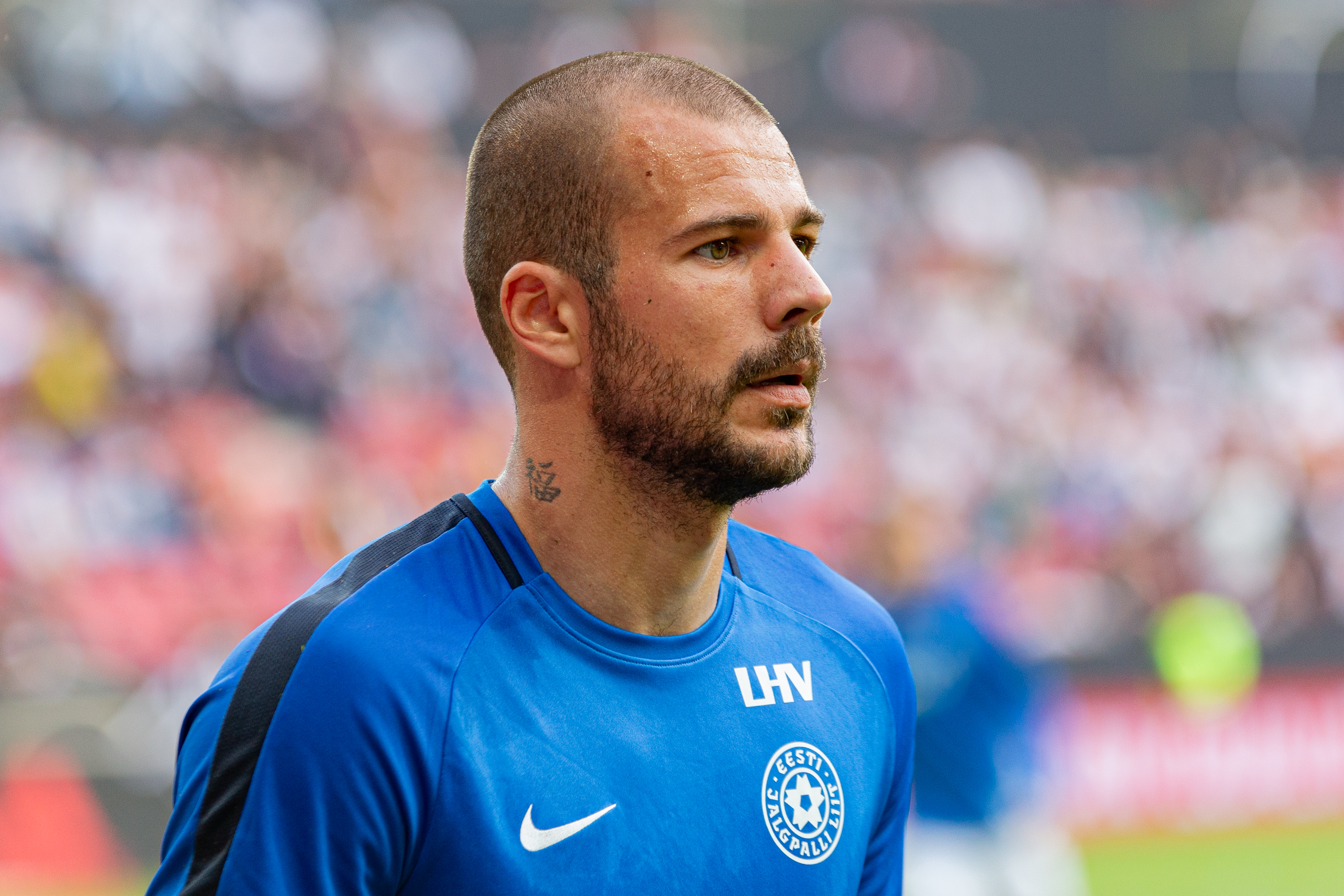
- Lepmets with Estonia in 2019

Personal information
- Full name: Sergei Lepmets
- Date of birth: 5 April 1987 (age 39)
- Place of birth: Tallinn, then part of Estonian SSR, Soviet Union
- Height: 1.90 m (6 ft 3 in)
- Position: Goalkeeper

Youth career
- –2004: TJK

Senior career*
Years	Team	Apps	(Gls)
2003	TJK III	15	(0)
2003	TJK II	2	(1)
2004–2005	Merkuur Tartu	42	(0)
2005	Merkuur-Juunior	2	(0)
2006–2010	Levadia II	104	(1)
2006	Levadia-Juunior	1	(0)
2007–2010	Levadia	31	(0)
2011	Politehnica Timișoara II	1	(0)
2011–2012	Politehnica Timișoara	22	(0)
2012	Concordia Chiajna	7	(0)
2013	Ceahlăul Piatra Neamț	3	(0)
2013	CSMS Iași	0	(0)
2014	Narva Trans	17	(0)
2014	Narva Trans II	1	(0)
2014	FC Hämeenlinna	5	(0)
2014–2015	Türi Ganvix	24	(1)
2016–2020	FCI Levadia	139	(0)
2021–2022	Nõmme Kalju	11	(0)

International career
2003	Estonia U17	3	(0)
2004–2005	Estonia U19	8	(0)
2010	Estonia U23	1	(0)
2018–2019	Estonia	12	(0)

Managerial career
- 2021–2022: Nõmme Kalju (gk coach)
- * Club domestic league appearances and goals as of 3 January 2023

Sergei Lepmets (born 5 April 1987) is an Estonian retired professional footballer who last played as a goalkeeper for Meistriliiga club Nõmme Kalju.

== Club career ==
=== TJK ===
Lepmets came through the TJK youth academy.

=== Merkuur ===
In 2004, Lepmets joined Merkuur Tartu. He made his debut in the Meistriliiga on 14 March 2004, in a 1–1 home draw against Kohtla-Järve FC Lootus.

=== Levadia ===
On 17 January 2006, Lepmets signed a three-year contract with Levadia in a deal which saw fellow goalkeeper Aleksandr Djatšenko heading in the opposite direction. As a second choice goalkeeper behind Martin Kaalma, he won three consecutive Meistriliiga titles between 2007 and 2009. Lepmets became a regular starter for Levadia in the 2010 season.

=== Politehnica Timișoara ===
On 1 February 2011, Lepmets joined Romanian club Politehnica Timișoara. The club finished the 2010–11 Liga I as runners-up, but were relegated to the Liga II due to unpaid debts. Following Costel Pantilimon's departure to Manchester City, Lepmets became the club's first-choice goalkeeper for the 2011–12 season.

=== Concordia Chiajna ===
In June 2012, Lepmets joined Liga I club Concordia Chiajna. He made his debut in the Liga I in a 0–1 away loss to Steaua București on 23 July 2012.

=== Ceahlăul Piatra Neamț ===
In January 2013, Lepmets joined Liga I club Ceahlăul Piatra Neamț on a four-year contract.

=== CSMS Iași ===
On 25 June 2013, Lepmets signed a three-year contract with Liga II club CSMS Iași.

=== Narva Trans ===
In August 2013, Lepmets returned to Estonia and trained with Infonet, before signing for Narva Trans.

=== FC Hämeenlinna ===
In July 2014, Lepmets left Narva Trans and signed for Finnish club FC Hämeenlinna.

=== Türi Ganvix ===
In September 2014, Lepmets returned to Estonia and joined II liiga club Türi Ganvix.

=== Return to Levadia ===
On 3 March 2016, Lepmets joined his former club Levadia.

== International career ==
On 23 August 2012, Lepmets was called up to the Estonia national team for the first time, for 2014 FIFA World Cup qualification matches against Romania and Turkey.

He made his senior international debut for Estonia on 30 May 2018, in 2–0 win over Lithuania at the Baltic Cup.

== Later career ==
In January 2021, Lepmets joined Nõmme Kalju FC, where he would function both as a goalkeeper and goalkeeper coach.

== Honours ==
FCI Levadia

- Meistriliiga: 2007, 2008, 2009
- Estonian Cup: 2006–07, 2009–10, 2017–18
- Estonian Supercup: 2010, 2018

Politehnica Timișoara

- Liga II: 2011–12
