= Adrian Poparadu =

Romanian footballer

Personal information
- Full name: Adrian Florin Poparadu
- Date of birth: 13 October 1987 (age 39)
- Place of birth: Timișoara, Romania
- Height: 1.82 m (5 ft 11 1/2 in)
- Position: Midfielder

Team information
- Current team: ACS Dumbrăvița
- Number: 20

Youth career
- 2004–2006: Politehnica Timișoara

Senior career*
Years	Team	Apps	(Gls)
2006–2012	Politehnica Timișoara	26	(1)
2007–2008	→ FCM Reșița (loan)	10	(0)
2008	→ Buftea (loan)	10	(0)
2009	→ Gloria Buzău (loan)	13	(0)
2009–2010	→ Otopeni (loan)	9	(0)
2012–2017	Poli Timișoara	80	(0)
2017–2019	ASU Politehnica	32	(1)
2019–	ACS Dumbrăvița	0	(0)
- * Club domestic league appearances and goals as of 13 February 2019 ‡ National team caps and goals as of 20 August 2011

Adrian Poparadu (born 13 October 1987 in Timișoara) is a Romanian professional footballer who plays as a midfielder for ACS Dumbrăvița.

== Club career ==
=== Early career ===
Poparadu began his youth career at Politehnica Timișoara.

=== Politehnica Timișoara ===
Poparadu made his debut in Liga I in 2007, against the rivals UTA Arad. After Alexandru Bourceanu's and Dan Alexa's departure from Poli, Poparadu began to be in first eleven in midfield with Iulian Tameş. In summer of 2011, he changes his number from 31 to 5, former number of capitan Dan Alexa. He plays twenty minutes in Liga II against Bihor Oradea.

== Career statistics ==
As of 16 November 2011

Club	Season	League		Cup		Europe		Total		
Club	Season	Apps	Goals	Apps	Goals	Apps	Goals	Apps	Goals	
Politehnica Timișoara	2006–07	1	0	0	0	—	1	0		
Politehnica Timișoara	2009–10	5	0	0	0	—	5	0		
Politehnica Timișoara	2010–11	5	0	1	0	1	0	-	7	0
Politehnica Timișoara	2011–12	10	0	3	0	-	13	0		
Total		21	0	4	0	1	26	0		
Career total		0	21	0	4	0	1	26	0	
