= Andrei Zăgrean =

Romanian footballer

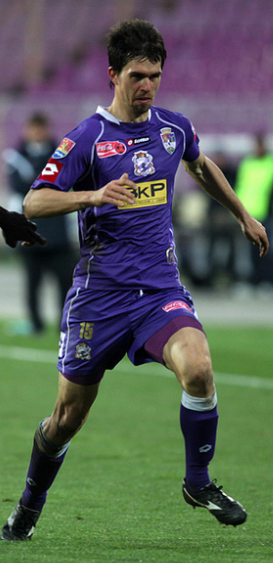

Personal information
- Full name: Andrei Sebastian Zăgrean
- Date of birth: 16 October 1986 (age 40)
- Place of birth: Alba Iulia, Romania
- Height: 1.91 m (6 ft 3 in)
- Position: Striker

Senior career*
Years	Team	Apps	(Gls)
2003–2004	Minaur Zlatna	10	(1)
2004–2009	Unirea Alba Iulia	106	(26)
2009–2010	Internaţional	10	(1)
2010	Silvania	11	(4)
2011–2012	Politehnica Timişoara	15	(6)
2012	→ Voinţa Sibiu (loan)	12	(4)
Total		164	(42)

International career^{‡}
2003–2004	Romania U-17	6	(2)
- * Club domestic league appearances and goals as of 4 May 2016 ‡ National team caps and goals as of 3 September 2011

Andrei Zăgrean (born 16 October 1986, in Alba Iulia) is a Romanian former striker.

== Early life ==
Zăgrean was born on 16 October 1986 in Alba Iulia, Romania.

=== Internațional ===
Zăgrean was transferred to newly promoted team Internaţional Curtea de Argeş. He made his debut on 1 November 2009 in a 1–0 loss to FC Vaslui at Municipal Stadium. Zăgrean was used in all remaining matches in championship by coach Ştefan Stoica. He scored his first goal for Internațional on 13 December 2009 against Steaua București making 2–2 at Ghencea. He was assisted by Emmanuel Koné.

=== Politehnica Timișoara ===
Zăgrean was loaned to FC Silvania for a 6-month spell and his good results caused Politehnica Timișoara to buy him. He signed a contract on 17 January 2011 along his new-teammates Sergei Lepmets, Sorin Ghionea and Nikola Ignjatijević and he said : "I met an extraordinary group, I arrived at a club professional who knows what they want. We expect a long war, we will fight to win to make the entire city happy". Zăgrean made his debut for Politehnica Timișoara in 0–0 draw against arch-rivals Steaua București. He scored his first goal against Astra Ploieşti in 2–2 draw. He scored for 2–2. In-form Zăgrean scored again two goals against Sportul Studenţesc.

== International career ==
Zăgrean is a former Romania U-17 international who played six matches and scored two goals.
