= Florin Sandu =

Romanian footballer

Personal information
- Full name: Florin Sandu
- Date of birth: 3 September 1987 (age 39)
- Place of birth: Otopeni, Romania
- Height: 1.73 m (5 ft 8 in)
- Positions: Left back; winger

Youth career
- 2005: Otopeni

Senior career*
Years	Team	Apps	(Gls)
2006–2007	Otopeni	24	(7)
2007–2012	Politehnica Timișoara	9	(1)
2008	→ Sportul Studențesc (loan)	12	(0)
2008	→ Buftea (loan)	11	(2)
2009	→ Gloria Buzău (loan)	13	(1)
2010	→ Otopeni (loan)	11	(0)
2010–2011	→ Râmnicu Vâlcea (loan)	22	(0)
2012	Concordia Chiajna	0	(0)
2013–2014	Gaz Metan Mediaș	0	(0)
Total		102	(11)

International career^{‡}
2005–2007	Romania U-19	3	(0)
- * Club domestic league appearances and goals as of 16 February 2016 ‡ National team caps and goals as of 25 November 2009

Florin Sandu (born 3 September 1987 in Iași) is a Romanian former footballer. He usually played on the left wing, either as defender, or as midfielder.

== Politehnica Timișoara ==
Together with teammate Sebastian Cojocnean, he was transferred to Timișoara in late September 2007, for a fee of EUR 550.000. He was loaned out to Sportul Studențesc in the second part of the 2007–2008 season, and in 2008–2009 he was part of the group of Timișoara players who moved to Buftea. He made the debut at FC Timișoara against Sanatatea Cluj in Cupa României score 7–0.
