= Marian Iancu =

Romanian businessman

Marian Alexandru Iancu (born 11 July 1965 in Bucharest) is a Romanian businessman, president of oil company Balkan Petroleum (UK) Limited, and was the president of Romanian football club FC Politehnica Timișoara.

After living abroad until the age of nine due to his parents' job, Iancu played competitive football in his youth, and then worked as an auto mechanic. He made about 60.000 lei/month at a time when the average salary in Romania was 2.500 lei/month and soon became the owner of seven shops that sold spare auto parts for Dacia cars. Later he studied economics, finance and banking

In October 2014, he was sentenced to 12 years in prison for money laundering and tax evasion in the so-called RAFO-VGB case.

Preceded by Anton Doboș	Chairman of FC Politehnica Timişoara; 2005–2012	Succeeded by Florenţiu Staicu
