= Lukáš Magera =

Czech footballer (born 1983)

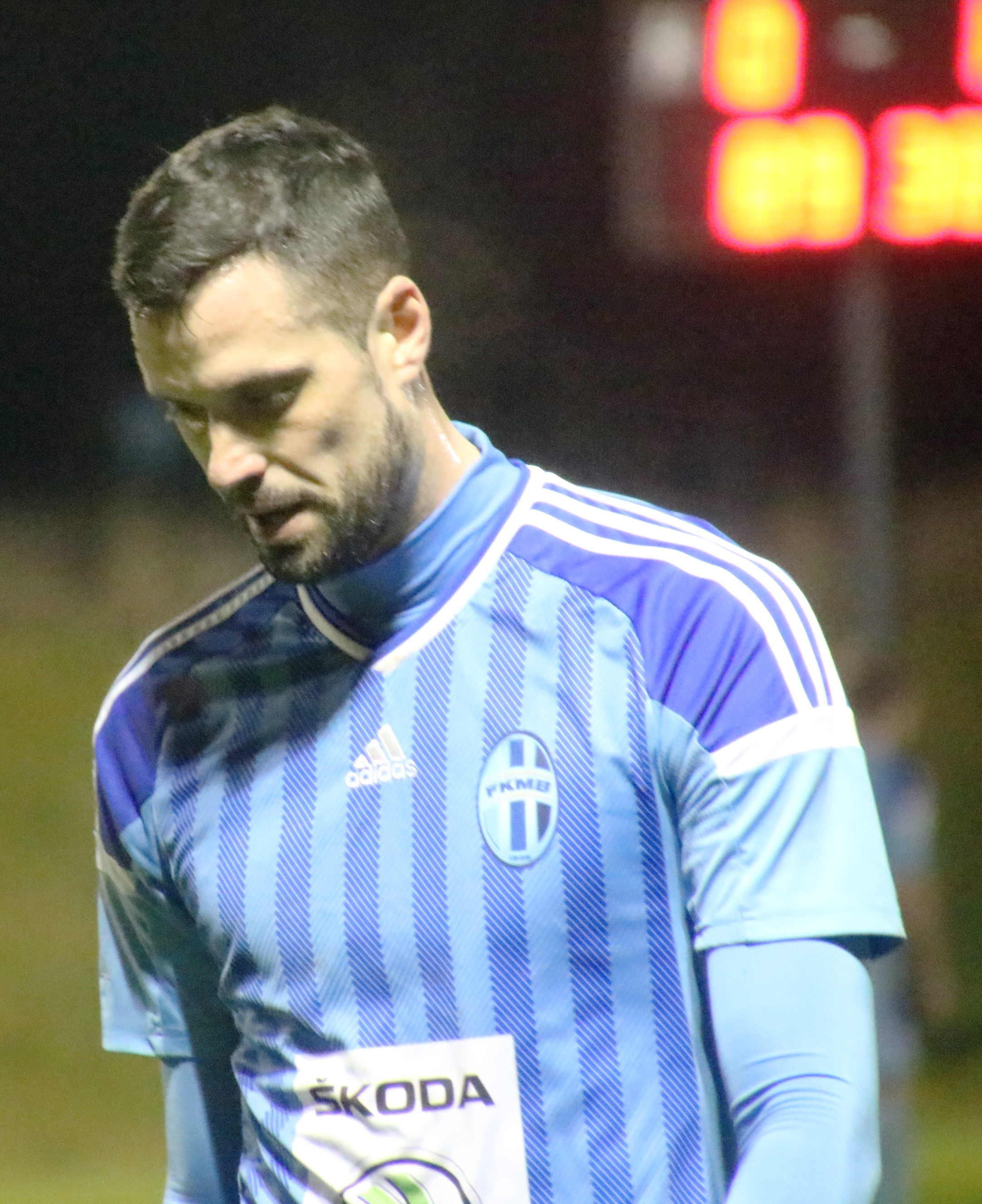
- Lukáš Magera playing for Mladá Boleslav in 2016.

Personal information
- Date of birth: 17 January 1983 (age 43)
- Place of birth: Opava, Czechoslovakia
- Height: 1.93 m (6 ft 4 in)
- Position: Striker

Youth career
- 1989–1995: MSA Dolní Benešov
- 1995–2003: Baník Ostrava

Senior career*
Years	Team	Apps	(Gls)
2003–2008	Baník Ostrava	110	(20)
2004–2005	→ Kladno (loan)	12	(3)
2008–2011	Politehnica Timişoara	85	(20)
2011–2012	Swindon Town	12	(1)
2012	→ Baník Ostrava (loan)	13	(3)
2012–2018	Mladá Boleslav	130	(35)
2018–2019	Zbrojovka Brno	42	(17)
2020	Zápy	9	(5)

International career^{‡}
2004–2005	Czech Republic U-21	13	(2)
2009–2011	Czech Republic	4	(0)
Medal record
Baník Ostrava
Winner	Gambrinus liga	2004
Politehnica Timişoara
Runner-up	Liga I	2009
Runner-up	Romanian Cup	2009
Runner-up	Liga I	2011
- * Club domestic league appearances and goals as of 22 January 2020 ‡ National team caps and goals as of 19:15, 10 April 2011 (UTC)

Lukáš Magera (born 17 January 1983, in Opava) is a Czech former international footballer who played as a striker. Since June 2018 he has been at FC Zbrojovka Brno, where he signed a two-year contract. In January 2020 he signed for Zápy. He made his international debut on 5 June 2009 in a friendly against Malta.

== Honours ==
FC Baník Ostrava

- Czech First League: 2003–04
- Czech Cup: 2004–05

Swindon Town

- Football League Two: 2011–12

Mladá Boleslav

- Czech Cup: 2015–16
