= Pedro Taborda =

Portuguese footballer

Personal information
- Full name: Pedro Manuel Taborda Moreira
- Date of birth: 22 June 1978 (age 48)
- Place of birth: Covilhã, Portugal
- Height: 1.89 m (6 ft 2 in)
- Position: Goalkeeper

Youth career
- 1988–1989: Senhora da Hora
- 1989–1997: Freamunde

Senior career*
Years	Team	Apps	(Gls)
1997–1998	Porto	0	(0)
1998–1999	Vizela	3	(0)
1999–2002	Ermesinde	96	(0)
2002–2004	Freamunde	44	(0)
2004–2008	Naval	96	(0)
2008–2011	Poli Timişoara	24	(0)
2011–2012	Naval	28	(0)
2012–2013	Brașov	16	(0)
2013	Naval	15	(0)
2013–2016	Covilhã	94	(0)
2016–2017	Moreirense	1	(0)
Total		417	(0)
- * Club domestic league appearances and goals

Pedro Manuel Taborda Moreira (born 22 June 1978) is a Portuguese former professional footballer who played as a goalkeeper.

== Club career ==
Taborda was born in Covilhã. In a 20-year senior career, spent mainly in his country's Segunda Liga, he appeared in 68 games in the Primeira Liga, all but one in representation of Associação Naval 1º de Maio from 2005 to 2008; his debut in the competition took place on 21 August 2005 at already 27, when he helped to a 2–0 away win against Vitória S.C. where his team finished with eight players.

Taborda retired in June 2017 at the age of 39, becoming his last club Moreirense FC's goalkeeper coach. He played three and a half seasons in the Romanian Liga I, with FC Politehnica Timișoara and FC Brașov.

== Honours ==
Moreirense

- Taça da Liga: 2016–17
