= Hélder Maurílio =

Brazilian footballer (born 1988)

Personal information
- Full name: Hélder Maurílio da Silva Ferreira
- Date of birth: 13 April 1988 (age 38)
- Place of birth: Ribeirão Preto, Brazil
- Height: 1.75 m (5 ft 9 in)
- Position: Full back

Team information
- Current team: Londrina

Senior career*
Years	Team	Apps	(Gls)
2008	Juventude		
2008–2012	Nancy	32	(0)
2009–2010	→ Rapid București (loan)	28	(2)
2010	→ Dinamo București (loan)	2	(0)
2010–2011	→ Politehnica Timişoara (loan)	22	(1)
2013	Internacional	0	(0)
2013	→ Ceará (loan)	7	(0)
2014	Náutico	1	(0)
2015–2016	Juventude	13	(0)
2016	América Mineiro	10	(0)
2017	Goiás	10	(0)
2018	Joinville	6	(0)
2018	Boa Esporte	20	(4)
2019	Brasil de Pelotas	6	(0)
2019–	Londrina	2	(0)
Medal record
Politehnica Timişoara
Runner-up	Liga I	2011
- * Club domestic league appearances and goals as of 30 January 2019

Hélder Maurílio da Silva Ferreira (13 April 1988), known as Hélder Maurílio or simply Hélder, is a Brazilian footballer who plays for Grêmio Prudente. Mainly a right back, he can also play as a winger.

== Club career ==
=== Juventude ===
Helder started his career at Juventude.

=== Nancy ===
In 2008, Helder was transferred to Nancy, signing a 5-year deal.

=== Rapid București ===
On 23 July 2009 the Ligue 1 club AS Nancy has the 21-year-old Brazilian right defender loaned out for the 2009/2010 season with a purchase option to Rapid.

=== Dinamo București ===
In the summer of 2010, he was loaned in Romania again, this time to Dinamo București, but with an option for Dinamo to buy the player for 4 years. Shortly after he joined Dinamo, he had a conflict with team's coach, Ioan Andone, and he decided to leave, signing with Liga I rivals FC Timişoara.

=== Politehnica Timișoara ===
On 3 September 2010, Helder was loaned out this time on FC Timişoara. After he signed the contract, said: "I decided to come to Timișoara because for me it's better. I know that Poli wanted me but I did not come before then because I was advised. I was told <go to Dinamo, go to Dinamo>. But for my career what I did was a disaster. I hope Timișoara be my salvation. I know this is a strong group here at Poli. And if I am are here in Timișoara is normal I want to win the championship with Poli". He chose the number 20. He made an ideal debut for Poli scoring one goal in 1–1 draw against Astra Ploiești. On 16 June 2011 his contract expired and he returns to Nancy.

== Honours ==
Internacional

- Campeonato Gaúcho: 2013
