= Dan Păltinișanu Stadium (1963) =

Romanian stadium, 1963 to 2022

- The Great Oval (Marele Oval)
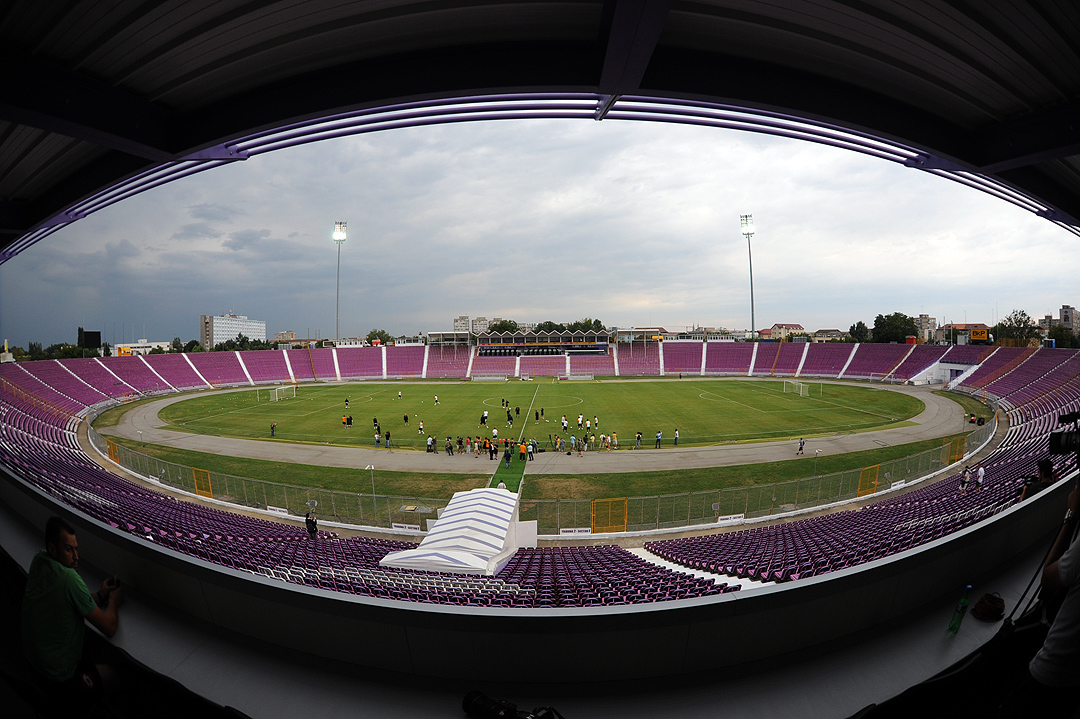
- The stadium in 2009
- Interactive map of Dan Păltinișanu Stadium
- Former names: 1 May (1963–1990); Politehnica (1990–1992); Silviu Bindea (1992–1995)
- Address: 7 FC Ripensia Alley; Timișoara; Romania
- Coordinates: 45°44′25.65″N 21°14′39.1″E
- Owner: Timiș County Council
- Capacity: 32,972
- Surface: Grass
- Scoreboard: Yes
- Record attendance: 65,000 (Lepa Brena concert, 1984)
- Field size: 105 m × 68 m (344 ft × 223 ft)
- Public transit: Bus line E2; Trolleybus line 16; Tram line 9

Construction
- Groundbreaking: 25 July 1960
- Built: 1960–1963
- Opened: 1 May 1963
- Renovated: 1985, 2002, 2008
- Closed: 25 February 2022
- Demolished: February 2025

Tenants
- FC Politehnica Timișoara/SSU Politehnica Timișoara (1963–2012, 2014–2022); ACS Poli Timișoara (2012–2020); SCM Rugby Timișoara (2014–2022)

The Dan Păltinișanu Stadium (Romanian: Stadionul Dan Păltinișanu), named after footballer Dan Păltinișanu, was a multi-purpose stadium in Timișoara, Romania. Before getting demolished in 2025 it had a seating capacity of 32,972, the second-largest in Romania. Operated until 2022, the stadium was used mostly for football matches by the local team, FC Politehnica Timișoara/SSU Politehnica Timișoara. It also hosted a few matches of the football national team. A new successor with 32,000 seats is being worked on to replace it on the site.

== History ==
The stadium was officially inaugurated on 1 May 1963, then named 1 May. The construction of the stadium was done with the workers from the city's factories. Its structure was similar to the one used to build most of the Romanian stadiums of that time, i.e. compacted earth. This constructive solution proved to be extremely problematic, as the compaction of the earth over time led to the deterioration of the stadium. The original capacity was 40,000 on benches, but in 2005, when the plastic seats were installed, the capacity was reduced to 32,972.

The stadium was named after deceased footballer Dan Păltinișanu (1951–1995) who played 10 seasons at FC Politehnica Timișoara.

The floodlighting system, with a density of 1,456 lx, was inaugurated in 2003, at a match against Petrolul Ploiești. Following two general renovations, in 2002 and 2008, the venue was able to host UEFA Champions League games. It was a four-star establishment with all the facilities required for the team, internet for the press room, 30 cameras for video surveillance, electrically heated pitch, an automated irrigation system and a modern scoreboard.

The stadium has long been in an advanced state of degradation, and plans for demolishment to make way for a new venue with 32,000 seats were drawn up. It was finally closed on 25 February 2022, as it no longer met the quality standards. The last event on the stadium was a Liga 2 match between Poli Timișoara and Petrolul Ploiești during which the floodlight dimmed twice by the 37th minute, and thus resulting in an automatic technical loss being sanctioned for the hosting city team. It was then demolished in 2025.

== Events ==
=== Association football ===
The Romania national football team played selected matches at the venue. The first game was played in March 1983 against Yugoslavia. Since then another six games were played, the last one in March 2010 against Israel.

International football matches
Date	Competition	Home	Away	Score	Attendance
30 March 1983	Friendly	Romania	(Socialist Federal Republic of Yugoslavia) Yugoslavia	0–2	~25,000
28 August 1985	1986 FIFA World Cup qualification	Romania	Finland	2–0	~35,000
23 April 1986	Friendly	Romania	Soviet Union	2–1	~25,000
20 November 2002	Friendly	Romania	Croatia	0–1	~38,000
6 June 2007	UEFA Euro 2008 qualifying	Romania	Slovenia	2–0	27,850
3 March 2010	Friendly	Romania	Israel	0–2	~18,000

International football clubs matches
Date	Competition	Home	Away	Score	Attendance
13 September 1978	UEFA Cup	(Romania) Politehnica Timișoara	(Hungary) MTK Hungária	2–0	25.000
1 November 1978	UEFA Cup	(Romania) Politehnica Timișoara	(Hungary) Budapest Honvéd	2–0	10.000
1 October 1980	European Cup Winners' Cup	(Romania) Politehnica Timișoara	(Scotland) Celtic	1–0	40.000
5 November 1980	European Cup Winners' Cup	(Romania) Politehnica Timișoara	(England) West Ham United	1–0	25.000
19 August 1981	European Cup Winners' Cup	(Romania) Politehnica Timișoara	(East Germany) Lokomotive Leipzig	2–0	18.000
19 September 1990	UEFA Cup	(Romania) Politehnica Timișoara	(Spain) Atlético Madrid	2–0	37.000
7 November 1990	UEFA Cup	(Romania) Politehnica Timișoara	(Portugal) Sporting CP	2–0	20.000
16 September 1992	UEFA Cup	(Romania) Politehnica Timișoara	(Spain) Real Madrid	1–1	26.000
18 September 2008	UEFA Cup	(Romania) Politehnica Timișoara	(Serbia) Partizan	1–2	20.000
5 August 2009	UEFA Champions League	(Romania) Politehnica Timișoara	(Ukraine) Shakhtar Donetsk	0–0	30.000
18 August 2009	UEFA Champions League	(Romania) Politehnica Timișoara	(Germany) Stuttgart	0–2	23.446
1 October 2009	UEFA Europa League	(Romania) Politehnica Timișoara	(Croatia) Dinamo Zagreb	0–3	7.000
22 October 2009	UEFA Europa League	(Romania) Politehnica Timișoara	(Belgium) Anderlecht	0–0	8.000
2 December 2009	UEFA Europa League	(Romania) Politehnica Timișoara	(Netherlands) Ajax	1–2	8.085
5 August 2010	UEFA Europa League	(Romania) Politehnica Timișoara	(Finland) MYPA	3–3	8.000
19 August 2010	UEFA Europa League	(Romania) Politehnica Timișoara	(England) Manchester City	0–1	24.695

=== Concerts ===
Date	Artist	Tour	Attendance
10 August 1984	Lepa Brena	Bato, Bato Tour	65,000
17 July 2006	Shakira	Oral Fixation Tour	30,000

== See also ==
- List of football stadiums in Romania
- List of places in Timișoara
