= FC Politehnica II Timișoara =

Politehnica II Timișoara
- Full name: Fotbal Club Politehnica II Timișoara
- Founded: 2005
- Dissolved: 2012
- Ground: Stadionul Știința
- Capacity: 3,000
Home colours	Away colours

FC Politehnica II Timișoara was the reserve squad of FC Politehnica Timișoara. It was founded in 2005, and dissolved in 2012.

In the sixteenths-finals phase of the Romanian Cup 2006–07 edition Politehnica II played against their first team, Politehnica Timișoara, the game ending with a 3–1 loss for Politehnica II.
