= 2011–12 Liga II =

Liga II
- Season: 2011–12
- Teams: 32
- Promoted: Studențesc Iași; Viitorul Constanța; Gloria Bistrița; Gaz Metan Severin
- Relegated: Snagov; Gloria Buzău; Victoria Brănești; Juventus București; Mureșul Deva; Arieșul Turda
- Top goalscorer: Alexandru Chițu (17 goals)

The 2011–12 Liga II was the 72nd season of the Liga II, the second tier of the Romanian football league system. The league structure had two series of 16 teams each. The first two teams in each series were promoted and the last three in each series were relegated. The season began on August 20.

== Teams ==
Three of the five relegated teams from the previous Liga I season, Timișoara, Gloria Bistrița and Unirea Urziceni, did not apply for a Liga II license. The latter club was dissolved, while the first two appealed the relegation decision at the Court of Arbitration for Sport and did not to apply for Liga II licenses. Previously they were denied Liga I licenses for the 2011–12 season and were relegated, despite finishing on non-relegating spots. Their cases were dismissed by the CAS on July 18. (See 2011–12 Liga I licensing controversies.) On July 8, the executive committee of the FRF decided to accept Timișoara and Gloria Bistrița in this season of Liga II despite not requesting a license, arguing the decision as taken in consideration for their respective cities and supporters. Also relegated from the first division, Universitatea Craiova was temporary excluded by FRF from all internal competitions. Juventus București were spared from relegation instead. Additionally, Timișoara would not have the right to promote, falling the three-year rule of the Financial Fair Play Regulations.

=== Seria I ===
Location of Seria I teams in 2011–12 Liga II

Club	City	Stadium	Capacity
Astra II	Giurgiu	Marin Anastasovici	7,000
Bacău	Bacău	Municipal	17,500
Botoșani	Botoșani	Municipal	12,000
Brăila	Brăila	Municipal	18,000
Callatis Mangalia	Mangalia	Central	5,000
Delta Tulcea	Tulcea	Delta	12,000
Dinamo II București	Bucharest	Florea Dumitrache	1,500
Dunărea Galați	Galați	Dunărea	23,000
Farul Constanța	Constanța	Farul	15,500
Gloria Buzău	Buzău	Municipal	18,000
Studențesc Iași	Iași	Emil Alexandrescu	11,390
Otopeni	Otopeni	Otopeni	1,200
Săgeata Năvodari	Năvodari	Petromidia	5,000
Snagov	Snagov	Snagov	2,000
Victoria Brănești	Brănești	Cătălin Hîldan	2,500
Viitorul Constanța	Ovidiu	Ovidiu	1,000

=== Seria II ===
Location of Seria II teams in 2011–12 Liga II

Club	City	Stadium	Capacity
Alro Slatina	Slatina	Metalurgistul	5,000
Argeș Pitești	Pitești	Nicolae Dobrin	15,000
Arieșul Turda	Turda	Municipal	10,000
Bihor Oradea	Oradea	Iuliu Bodola	18,000
Chindia Târgoviște	Târgoviște	Eugen Popescu	10,000
Gaz Metan Drobeta-Turnu Severin	Drobeta-Turnu Severin	Municipal	20,054
Gloria Bistrița	Bistrița	Gloria	7,800
Juventus București	Bucharest	Juventus	8,000
Luceafărul Oradea	Oradea	Luceafărul	3,000
Maramureș Baia Mare	Baia Mare	Viorel Mateianu	15,500
Mureșul Deva	Deva	Cetate	4,000
Olt Slatina	Slatina	Municipal	4,000
Râmnicu Vâlcea	Râmnicu Vâlcea	Municipal	12,000
Timișoara	Timișoara	Dan Păltinișanu	32,972
Unirea Alba Iulia	Alba Iulia	Cetate	18,000
UTA Arad	Arad	Francisc von Neumann	7,287

== League tables ==
=== Seria I ===
Pos	Team	Pld	W	D	L	GF	GA	GD	Pts	Promotion or relegation
1	CSMS Iași (C, P)	30	19	4	7	51	26	+25	61 (Note: IAS 1-0 VII; VII 1-1 IAS)	Promotion to Liga I
2	Viitorul Constanța (P)	30	17	10	3	55	18	+37	61	Promotion to Liga I
3	Delta Tulcea	30	17	8	5	55	28	+27	59	
4	Săgeata Năvodari	30	14	7	9	47	33	+14	49	
5	FC Botoșani	30	13	9	8	42	31	+11	48 (Note: BOT 1-0 BRA; BRA 2-1 BOT)	
6	Brăila	30	15	3	12	47	40	+7	48	
7	FCM Bacău	30	13	6	11	43	31	+12	45	
8	Farul Constanța	30	11	11	8	45	42	+3	44	
9	Callatis Mangalia	30	13	4	13	43	41	+2	43	
10	Dunărea Galați	30	11	7	12	38	40	−2	40	
11	Astra II Giurgiu	30	10	6	14	35	48	−13	36	
12	CS Otopeni	30	10	5	15	37	44	−7	35	
13	Dinamo II București	30	8	10	12	32	35	−3	34	
14	FC Snagov (Note: FC Snagov and FC Victoria Brănești withdrew from the championship during the second half and lost all remaining matches with 3-0.) (R)	30	6	6	18	29	60	−31	24	Relegation to Liga III
15	Gloria Buzău (R)	30	6	5	19	26	62	−36	23	Relegation to Liga III
16	Victoria Brănești (R)	30	4	3	23	17	64	−47	15	Relegation to Liga III

Source: FRF (in Romanian)
Rules for classification: 1st points; 2nd head-to-head points; 3rd head-to-head goal difference; 4th head-to-head goals scored; 5th head-to-head away goals scored; 6th goal difference; 7th number of goals scored
(C) Champions; (P) Promoted; (R) Relegated

=== Seria II ===
Pos	Team	Pld	W	D	L	GF	GA	GD	Pts	Promotion or relegation
1	Politehnica Timișoara (Note: Politehnica Timișoara have canceled their license application due to remaining unpaid debts and will not have the right to promote.) (C)	30	19	8	3	54	19	+35	65 (Note: GLO 2-2 POL; POL 1-1 GLO)	
2	Gloria Bistrița (P)	30	19	8	3	60	29	+31	65	Promotion to Liga I
3	Gaz Metan Severin (Note: Gaz Metan Severin promoted from 3rd position since Politehnica Timișoara canceled their license application for the new season.) (P)	30	18	5	7	50	25	+25	59	Promotion to Liga I
4	UTA Arad	30	14	9	7	41	20	+21	51	
5	Alro Slatina	30	14	8	8	41	22	+19	50	
6	Luceafărul Oradea	30	13	8	9	34	27	+7	47	
7	Chindia Târgoviște	30	11	11	8	34	24	+10	44 (Note: CHI 1-1 BIH; BIH 2-2 CHI)	
8	Bihor Oradea	30	12	8	10	40	35	+5	44	
9	Unirea Alba Iulia	30	10	11	9	34	26	+8	41	
10	Argeș Pitești	30	10	9	11	34	47	−13	39	
11	Maramureș Universitar Baia Mare	30	10	5	15	38	50	−12	35 (Note: RAM 1-2 BAI; BAI 0-1 RAM)	
12	Râmnicu Vâlcea	30	9	8	13	34	38	−4	35	
13	Olt Slatina	30	9	7	14	30	35	−5	34	
14	Juventus București (R)	30	4	8	18	24	44	−20	20	Relegation to Liga III
15	Mureșul Deva (R)	30	6	2	22	20	72	−52	20	Relegation to Liga III
16	Arieșul Turda (Note: FC Arieșul Turda withdrew from the championship during the winter break and lost all remaining matches with 3-0.) (R)	30	2	5	23	10	65	−55	11	Relegation to Liga III

Source: FRF (in Romanian)
Rules for classification: 1st points; 2nd head-to-head points; 3rd head-to-head goal difference; 4th head-to-head goals scored; 5th head-to-head away goals scored; 6th goal difference; 7th number of goals scored
(C) Champions; (P) Promoted; (R) Relegated

== Goals ==
12 goals

- (Romania) Daniel Florea (Delta Tulcea)

6 goals

- (Romania) Cristian Silvășan (Gloria Bistrița)

5 goals

- (Romania) Bogdan Mara (UTA Arad)

4 goals

- (Romania) Daniel Stan (Gloria Bistrița)

== See also ==
- 2011–12 Liga I
- 2011–12 Liga III
