= 2010–11 CFR Cluj season =

CFR Cluj
2010–11 season
- Manager: Andrea Mandorlini (until 15 September); Sorin Cârțu (from 15 September to 24 November); Alin Minteuan (from December)
- Stadium: Dr. Constantin Rădulescu Stadium
- Liga I: 10th
- Cupa României: Quarter-finals
- Supercupa României: Winners
- UEFA Champions League: Group stage
Home colours	Away colours

The 2010–11 season was Fotbal Club CFR 1907 Cluj's 7th consecutive season in the Liga I and 103rd year in existence as a football club. In addition to the domestic league, CFR Cluj participated in that season's editions of the Cupa României, the Supercupa României and the UEFA Champions League.

== Squad ==
Note: Flags indicate national team as defined under FIFA eligibility rules; some limited exceptions apply. Players may hold more than one non-FIFA nationality.

No.	Pos.	Nation	Player
1	GK	POR	Claro
3	DF	BRA	Edimar
4	DF	ROU	Cristian Panin
5	MF	BFA	Bakary Saré
6	MF	ROU	Gabriel Mureșan
7	MF	ROU	Emil Dică
8	MF	ANG	Dominique Kivuvu
9	FW	GRE	Pantelis Kapetanos
10	MF	ITA	Roberto De Zerbi
11	MF	ROU	Viorel Nicoară
12	GK	ROU	Călin Tiut
13	DF	ITA	Felice Piccolo
16	MF	BRA	Rafael Bastos
17	DF	ROU	Vasile Maftei
18	MF	ARG	Sixto Peralta

No.	Pos.	Nation	Player
19	DF	ROU	Paul Mocan
20	DF	POR	Cadú
21	FW	ROU	Sergiu Negruț
22	MF	ROU	Ioan Hora
23	DF	BRA	Léo Veloso
24	DF	ROU	Ionuț Rada
25	FW	ROU	Sergiu Buș
28	MF	CIV	Emmanuel Koné
29	FW	ROU	Paul Batin
32	GK	ROU	Mihai Mincă
44	GK	ROU	Eduard Stăncioiu
55	DF	POR	Nuno Diogo
60	GK	ITA	Remo Amadio
85	FW	ROU	Cristian Bud

== Competitions ==
=== Overview ===
Competition	First match	Last match	Starting round	Final position	Record							
Competition	First match	Last match	Starting round	Final position	Pld	W	D	L	GF	GA	GD	Win %
Liga I	24 July 2010	21 May 2011	Matchday 1	10th	34	11	12	11	50	45	+5	32.35
Cupa României	21 September 2010	11 November 2010	Round of 32	Quarter-finals	3	2	0	1	3	1	+2	66.67
Supercupa României	18 July 2010		Final	Winners	1	0	1	0	2	2	+0	0.00
UEFA Champions League	15 September 2010	8 December 2010	Group stage	Group stage	6	1	1	4	6	12	−6	16.67
Total					44	14	14	16	61	60	+1	31.82

Source: Competitions

=== Supercupa României ===
As the previous season's Liga I and Cupa României winners, CFR Cluj played against league runners-up Unirea Urziceni in the 2010 Supercupa României.

18 July 2010 Final	CFR Cluj	2–2 (a.e.t.) (2–0 p)	Unirea Urziceni	Cluj-Napoca
20:30 EEST (UTC+3)	Kivuvu 12'; Mureșan (yellow card) 76'; Deac 107'	Report	Kivuvu 53' (o.g.); Onofraș (yellow card) 65'; Paraschiv (yellow card) 81'; Marinescu 97'; Arlauskis (yellow card) 110'; Galamaz (yellow card) 120'	Stadium: Dr. Constantin Rădulescu Stadium; Referee: Marius Avram
	Penalties
	Mureşan (penalty missed); Piccolo (penalty scored); Deac (penalty missed); E. Dică (penalty scored)		(penalty missed) Marinescu; (penalty missed) Maftei; (penalty missed) Brandán; (penalty missed) P. Marin
Note: CFR Cluj won 2–0 on penalties.

=== Liga I ===
==== League table ====
Pos	Team	Pld	W	D	L	GF	GA	GD	Pts
8	Universitatea Cluj	34	13	8	13	48	54	−6	47
9	Târgu Mureș	34	12	9	13	34	41	−7	45 (Note: TMU: 8 pts, 3–1; CFR: 3 pts, 4–5; AST: 3 pts, 3–4)
10	CFR Cluj	34	11	12	11	50	45	+5	45
11	Astra Ploiești	34	10	15	9	36	30	+6	45
12	Brașov	34	10	13	11	34	40	−6	43

Source: LPF (in Romanian)
Rules for classification: 1st points; 2nd head-to-head points; 3rd head-to-head goal difference; 4th head-to-head goals scored; 5th overall goal difference; 6th overall goals scored

==== Results summary ====
Overall								Home						Away					
Pld	W	D	L	GF	GA	GD	Pts	W	D	L	GF	GA	GD	W	D	L	GF	GA	GD
34	11	12	11	50	45	+5	45	8	4	5	26	17	+9	3	8	6	24	28	−4

Source: Competitions

==== Matches ====
24 July 2010 1	FC U Craiova	0–0	CFR Cluj	Drobeta-Turnu Severin
18:00 EEST (UTC+3)		Report		Stadium: Stadionul Municipal; Referee: Alexandru Tudor

2 August 2010 2	CFR Cluj	2–0	Victoria Brănești	Cluj-Napoca
20:30 EEST (UTC+3)	Mureșan 62'; Culio 64'	Report		Stadium: Dr. Constantin Rădulescu Stadium; Referee: Mugurel Drăgănescu

8 August 2010 3	Politehnica Timișoara	3–2	CFR Cluj	Timișoara
	Curtean 29', 60'; Axente 37'	Report	Bjelanović 26'; Koné 90'	Stadium: Dan Păltinișanu Stadium; Referee: Alexandru Deaconu

13 August 2010 4	CFR Cluj	2–2	Astra Ploiești	Cluj-Napoca
20:00 EEST (UTC+3)	Traoré 37'; Bud 79'	Report	Pătrașcu 21'; Fatai 84'	Stadium: Dr. Constantin Rădulescu Stadium; Referee: Teodor Crăciunescu

20 August 2010 5	Sportul Studențesc București	3–0	CFR Cluj	Bucharest
18:00 EEST (UTC+3)	Bălan 22', 58'; Pătrașcu 61'	Report		Stadium: Regie Stadium; Referee: Radu Petrescu

28 August 2010 6	CFR Cluj	2–1	Pandurii Târgu Jiu	Cluj-Napoca
21:30 EEST (UTC+3)	Koné 19'; Alcântara 23'	Report	Voiculeț 85' (pen.)	Stadium: Dr. Constantin Rădulescu Stadium; Referee: Marian Balaci

10 September 2010 7	Rapid București	2–0	CFR Cluj	Bucharest
20:30 EEST (UTC+3)	Cássio 58', 90'	Report		Stadium: Stadionul Giulești-Valentin Stănescu; Referee: Augustus Constantin

19 September 2010 8	CFR Cluj	1–2	Târgu Mureș	Cluj-Napoca
18:00 EEST (UTC+3)	Dică 61'	Report	Munteanu 83'; Stere 85'	Stadium: Dr. Constantin Rădulescu Stadium; Referee: Marius Avram

24 September 2010 9	Universitatea Cluj	1–1	CFR Cluj	Alba Iulia
16:30 EEST (UTC+3)	Lemnaru (yellow card) 6'; Niculescu 15', (yellow card) 16'; Mendy (yellow card) 29'; Păcurar (yellow card) 62'	Report	Cadú (yellow card) 14'; Traoré 30'	Stadium: Cetate Stadium; Referee: Alexandru Deaconu

3 October 2010 10	CFR Cluj	4–0	Brașov	Cluj-Napoca
18:00 EEST (UTC+3)	Bastos 18'; Cadú 36' (pen.); Traoré 48'; De Zerbi 73'	Report		Stadium: Dr. Constantin Rădulescu Stadium; Referee: Sebastian Colțescu

15 October 2010 11	Vaslui	5–3	CFR Cluj	Vaslui
22:00 EEST (UTC+3)	Sânmărtean 27'; Adaílton 35', 58'; Burdujan 63', 87'	Report	De Zerbi 59'; Bastos 89'; Dică 90'	Stadium: Vaslui Municipal Stadium; Referee: Robert Dumitru

24 October 2010 12	CFR Cluj	3–0	Unirea Urziceni	Cluj-Napoca
20:00 EEST (UTC+3)	Traoré 69'; De Zerbi 70', 90'	Report		Stadium: Dr. Constantin Rădulescu Stadium; Referee: Georgian Ionescu

30 October 2010 13	Oțelul Galați	1–1	CFR Cluj	Galați
15:00 EEST (UTC+3)	Iorga 58'	Report	Peralta 90'	Stadium: Oțelul Stadium; Referee: István Kovács

7 November 2010 14	CFR Cluj	1–0	Dinamo București	Cluj-Napoca
20:00 EET (UTC+2)	Bjelanović 25'	Report		Stadium: Dr. Constantin Rădulescu Stadium; Referee: Alexandru Deaconu

15 November 2010 15	Gloria Bistrița	0–3	CFR Cluj	Bistrița
20:30 EET (UTC+2)		Report	Traoré 55', 71'; Bjelanović 84'	Stadium: Jean Pădureanu Stadium; Referee: Alexandru Tudor

19 November 2010 16	CFR Cluj	1–1	Gaz Metan Mediaș	Cluj-Napoca
18:45 EET (UTC+2)	De Zerbi 1'	Report	Edimar 12' (o.g.)	Stadium: Dr. Constantin Rădulescu Stadium; Referee: Paul Unimatan

28 November 2010 17	Steaua București	2–2	CFR Cluj	Bucharest
21:00 EET (UTC+2)	Stancu 28' (pen.), 50'	Report	Culio 11'; Peralta 82'	Stadium: Stadionul Steaua; Referee: Marius Avram

3 December 2010 18	CFR Cluj	2–1	FC U Craiova	Cluj-Napoca
20:30 EET (UTC+2)	Traoré 69'; Kivuvu 72'	Report	Stoica 66'	Stadium: Dr. Constantin Rădulescu Stadium; Referee: Ovidiu Hațegan

27 February 2011 19	Victoria Brănești	1–1	CFR Cluj	Buzău
16:00 EET (UTC+2)	Coman 21'	Report	Mureșan 70'	Stadium: Stadionul Municipal; Referee: Alexandru Tudor

5 March 2011 20	CFR Cluj	1–2	Politehnica Timișoara	Cluj-Napoca
19:00 EET (UTC+2)	Cadú 8' (pen.)	Report	Zicu 6' (pen.); Ricketts 77'	Stadium: Dr. Constantin Rădulescu Stadium; Referee: Marius Avram

14 March 2011 21	Astra Ploiești	1–1	CFR Cluj	Ploiești
17:00 EET (UTC+2)	Strătilă 8'	Report	Batin 86'	Stadium: Astra Stadium; Referee: Adrian Comănescu

20 March 2011 22	CFR Cluj	2–0	Sportul Studențesc București	Cluj-Napoca
16:00 EET (UTC+2)	Bastos 20'; Mureșan 56'	Report		Stadium: Dr. Constantin Rădulescu Stadium; Referee: Florin Marcu

3 April 2011 23	Pandurii Târgu Jiu	2–1	CFR Cluj	Drobeta-Turnu Severin
17:00 EEST (UTC+3)	Lemnaru 45'; Vranješ 61'	Report	Bastos 70'	Stadium: Municipal Stadium; Referee: Alexandru Deaconu

7 April 2011 24	CFR Cluj	0–1	Rapid București	Cluj-Napoca
21:30 EEST (UTC+3)		Report	Spadacio 22'	Stadium: Dr. Constantin Rădulescu Stadium; Referee: Sebastian Colțescu

11 April 2011 25	Târgu Mureș	0–0	CFR Cluj	Târgu Mureș
17:00 EEST (UTC+3)		Report		Stadium: Trans-Sil Stadium; Referee: Andrei Chivulete

14 April 2011 26	CFR Cluj	1–1	Universitatea Cluj	Cluj-Napoca
20:30 EEST (UTC+3)	Koné 24'; Mureșan (yellow card) 57'	Report	Mendy (yellow card) 13' (yellow-red card) 16'; Cojocnean 90+3'	Stadium: Dr. Constantin Rădulescu Stadium; Referee: Ovidiu Hațegan

17 April 2011 27	Brașov	2–2	CFR Cluj	Brașov
19:00 EEST (UTC+3)	Ilyés 64'; Distéfano 80' (pen.)	Report	Koné 17'; Rada 78'	Stadium: Silviu Ploeșteanu Stadium; Referee: Teodor Crăciunescu

23 April 2011 28	CFR Cluj	1–0	Vaslui	Cluj-Napoca
14:00 EEST (UTC+3)	Cadú (28.pen.)	Report		Stadium: Dr. Constantin Rădulescu Stadium; Referee: Robert Dumitru

27 April 2011 29	Unirea Urziceni	1–3	CFR Cluj	Urziceni
15:00 EEST (UTC+3)	Peralta 16' (o.g.)	Report	Nicoară 26'; Koné 36'; Batin 58'	Stadium: Tineretului Stadium; Referee: Florin Miron

2 May 2011 30	CFR Cluj	0–1	Oțelul Galați	Cluj-Napoca
20:00 EEST (UTC+3)		Report	Antal 81'	Stadium: Dr. Constantin Rădulescu Stadium; Referee: Cristian Balaj

6 May 2011 31	Dinamo București	1–2	CFR Cluj	Bucharest
20:20 EEST (UTC+3)	Dănciulescu 14' (pen.)	Report	Batin 20'; Hora 76'	Stadium: Dinamo Stadium; Referee: Adrian Comănescu

9 May 2011 32	CFR Cluj	2–2	Gloria Bistrița	Cluj-Napoca
14:00 EEST (UTC+3)	Bud 61'; Mureșan 74'	Report	Nalați 10'; Tudose 45'	Stadium: Dr. Constantin Rădulescu Stadium; Referee: Ovidiu Hațegan

13 May 2011 33	Gaz Metan Mediaș	3–2	CFR Cluj	Mediaș
20:30 EEST (UTC+3)	Eric 30', 75'; Pîrvulescu 60'	Report	Rada 29'; Hora 36'	Stadium: Gaz Metan Stadium; Referee: Dragoş Istrate

21 May 2011 34	CFR Cluj	1–3	Steaua București	Cluj-Napoca
17:00 EEST (UTC+3)	Buș 43'	Report	Surdu 5'; Nicoliță 18'; Bilașco 89'	Stadium: Dr. Constantin Rădulescu Stadium; Referee: Sebastian Colțescu

=== Cupa României ===
21 September 2010 Round of 32	ACU Arad	0–1 (a.e.t.)	CFR Cluj	Arad
18:00 EEST (UTC+3)		Report	Bud 116'	Stadium: Stadionul Francisc von Neuman; Referee: Florin Marcu

27 October 2010 Round of 16	CFR Cluj	2–0	Târgu Mureș	Cluj-Napoca
18:30 EEST (UTC+3)	Bjelanović 31'; Sforzini 90'	Report		Stadium: Dr. Constantin Rădulescu Stadium; Referee: Dragoş Istrate

11 November 2010 Quarter-finals	CFR Cluj	0–1	Gloria Bistriţa	Cluj-Napoca
17:00 EET (UTC+2)		Report	Moraes 73' (pen.)	Stadium: Dr. Constantin Rădulescu Stadium; Referee: Cristian Balaj

=== UEFA Champions League ===
==== Group stage ====
Pos	Team	Pld	W	D	L	GF	GA	GD	Pts	Qualification	BAY	ROM	BSL	CLJ
1	(Germany) Bayern Munich	6	5	0	1	16	6	+10	15	Advance to knockout phase	—	2–0	3–0	3–2
2	(Italy) Roma	6	3	1	2	10	11	−1	10	Advance to knockout phase	3–2	—	1–3	2–1
3	(Switzerland) Basel	6	2	0	4	8	11	−3	6	Transfer to Europa League	1–2	2–3	—	1–0
4	(Romania) CFR Cluj	6	1	1	4	6	12	−6	4		0–4	1–1	2–1	—

Source: Soccerway

15 September 2010 1	CFR Cluj (Romania)	2–1	(Switzerland) Basel	Cluj-Napoca, Romania
21:45 EEST (UTC+3)	Rada 9', (yellow card) 90+2'; Traoré 12'; Panin (yellow card) 25'	Report	Stocker 45+2'; Streller (yellow card) 55'	Stadium: Dr. Constantin Rădulescu Stadium; Attendance: 9,593; Referee: Alan Kelly (Republic of Ireland)

28 September 2010 2	Roma (Italy)	2–1	(Romania) CFR Cluj	Rome, Italy
20:45 CEST (UTC+2)	Mexès 69'; Borriello 71'	Report	Dică (yellow card) 74'; Rada 78'	Stadium: Stadio Olimpico; Attendance: 30,252; Referee: Jonas Eriksson (Sweden)

19 October 2010 3	Bayern Munich (Germany)	3–2	(Romania) CFR Cluj	Munich, Germany
20:45 CEST (UTC+2)	Cadú 32' (o.g.); Panin 37' (o.g.); Schweinsteiger (yellow card) 70'; Gómez 77'; Pranjić (yellow card) 83'	Report	Dică (yellow card) 19'; Panin (yellow card) 25'; Cadú 28'; Culio 86'	Stadium: Allianz Arena; Attendance: 64,000; Referee: Martin Atkinson (England)

3 November 2010 4	CFR Cluj (Romania)	0–4	(Germany) Bayern Munich	Cluj-Napoca, Romania
21:45 EET (UTC+2)	Bastos (yellow card) 27'; Traoré (yellow card) 76'	Report	Gómez 12', 24', 71'; Ottl (yellow card) 15'; Schweinsteiger (yellow card) 25'; Demichelis (yellow card) 60'; Müller 90'	Stadium: Dr. Constantin Rădulescu Stadium; Attendance: 14,097; Referee: Serge Gumienny (Belgium)

23 November 2010 5	Basel (Switzerland)	1–0	(Romania) CFR Cluj	Basel, Switzerland
20:45 CET (UTC+1)	Almerares (yellow card) 14', (goal) 15'	Report	Veloso (yellow card) 30'; Cadú (yellow card) 62'; Costa (yellow card) 80'; Piccolo (red card) 88'	Stadium: St. Jakob-Park; Attendance: 34,239; Referee: Laurent Duhamel (France)

8 December 2010 6	CFR Cluj (Romania)	1–1	(Italy) Roma	Cluj-Napoca, Romania
21:45 EET (UTC+2)	Culio (yellow card) 19'; Traoré 88', (yellow card) 88'	Report	Borriello 21'	Stadium: Dr. Constantin Rădulescu Stadium; Attendance: 12,800; Referee: William Collum (Scotland)
