= 2010 Cupa României final =

- Event: 2009–10 Cupa României
FC Vaslui	CFR Cluj
Liga I	Liga I
0	0
- CFR Cluj won 5–4 after penalties
- Date: 26 May 2010
- Venue: Stadionul Emil Alexandrescu, Iaşi
- Man of the Match: Paul Papp
- Referee: Alexandru Deaconu
- Attendance: 11,000

The 2010 Cupa României final was the 72nd final of Romania's most prestigious cup competition. The final was played at the Emil Alexandrescu stadium in Iaşi between the Cup's holder, CFR Cluj and FC Vaslui. The trophy was won for the third year in a row by CFR Cluj after penalty kicks.

== Route to the final ==
CFR Cluj

Round of 32	Dunărea Galaţi	0–2	CFR Cluj
Round of 16	Gaz Metan CFR Craiova	0–1	CFR Cluj
Quarter-finals	Universitatea Craiova	0–1	CFR Cluj
Semifinals 1st Leg	Dinamo București	1–1	CFR Cluj
Semifinals 2nd Leg	CFR Cluj	2–1	Dinamo București

FC Vaslui

Round of 32	Chimia Brazi	0–5	FC Vaslui
Round of 16	Gaz Metan Mediaş	0–1	FC Vaslui
Quarter-finals	FC Vaslui	1–0	Internaţional Curtea de Argeş
Semifinals 1st Leg	FC Brașov	1–0	FC Vaslui
Semifinals 2nd Leg	FC Vaslui	4–0	FC Braşov

== Match details ==
26 May 2010
21:00 EEST

FC Vaslui	0–0	CFR Cluj
	Report
Penalties
Milisavljević (penalty missed); Zmeu (penalty scored); Costin (penalty scored); Burdujan (penalty scored); Wesley (penalty scored)	4–5	(penalty scored) Mureşan; (penalty scored) N. Dică; (penalty scored) Deac; (penalty scored) Bud; (penalty scored) Cadú

Stadionul Emil Alexandrescu, Iaşi
Attendance: 11,000
Referee: Alexandru Deaconu

FC Vaslui	CFR Cluj

FC VASLUI:
GK	81	(Romania) Cristian Hăisan
RB	20	(Bulgaria) Zhivko Milanov		(substituted off) 87'
CB	6	(Brazil) Gladstone Pereira
CB	3	(Romania) Paul Papp	(yellow card) 31'
LB	27	(Portugal) Hugo Luz
DM	23	(Serbia) Miloš Pavlović	(yellow card) 44'
CM	30	(Romania) Raul Costin
RM	31	(Romania) Adrian Gheorghiu
LM	18	(Romania) Lucian Sânmărtean		(substituted off) 46'
AM	80	(Brazil) Wesley (c)	(yellow card) 61'
ST	9	(Romania) Lucian Burdujan	(yellow card) 116'
Substitutes:
GK	22	(Romania) Claudiu Puia
CB	16	(France) Stéphane Zubar
LB	17	(Romania) Dinu Sânmărtean
CM	4	(Bulgaria) Stanislav Genchev
CM	8	(Moldova) Denis Zmeu		(substituted on) 87'
LM	11	(Serbia) Nemanja Milisavljević		(substituted on) 46'
ST	7	(Romania) Răzvan Neagu
Manager:
(Romania) Marius Lăcătuş

CFR CLUJ:
GK	1	(Portugal) Nuno Claro
RB	4	(Romania) Cristian Panin
CB	20	(Portugal) Cadú (c)
CB	13	(Italy) Felice Piccolo
LB	66	(Brazil) Edimar	(yellow card) 110'
DM	6	(Romania) Gabriel Mureşan
CM	8	(Argentina) Sixto Peralta	(yellow card) 83'	(substituted off) 83'
CM	19	(Argentina) Emmanuel Culio
RM	11	(Italy) Roberto De Zerbi	(yellow card) 33'	(substituted off) 92'
ST	17	(Burkina Faso) Yssouf Koné		(substituted off) 116'
LM	77	(Romania) Ciprian Deac
Substitutes:
GK	44	(Romania) Eduard Stăncioiu
RB	2	(France) Anthony da Silva
CB	15	(Brazil) Hugo Alcântara
CM	16	(Italy) Davide Bottone		(substituted on) 83'
CF	10	(Romania) Nicolae Dică		(substituted on) 116'
ST	85	(Romania) Cristian Bud		(substituted on) 92'
CF	99	(Brazil) Nei
Manager:
(Italy) Andrea Mandorlini

MATCH OFFICIALS

- Assistant referees:
  - (Romania) Cristian Nica
  - (Romania) Eduard Dumitrescu
- Fourth official:
  - (Romania) Sebastian Colţescu

MAN OF THE MATCH

- (Romania) Paul Papp

MATCH RULES

- 90 minutes.
- 30 minutes extra-time (15-minute intervals)
- Penalty shoot-out if scores level after extra time.
- Seven named substitutes
- Maximum of 3 substitutions.
