= 2010–11 in Romanian football =

2010–2011 Romania football season and related events

The 2010–11 season in Romanian football was held between the summer of 2010 and the summer of 2011. The first division consisted of 18 teams, with CFR Cluj as the defending champions. The men's national team started the UEFA Euro 2012 qualifying campaign in Group D, along with France, Belarus, Bosnia and Herzegovina, Albania and Luxembourg.

== Domestic leagues ==
In Liga I, Oţelul Galaţi won the title for the first time in their history and qualified into the group stage of the 2011–12 UEFA Champions League. Runners-up came Timișoara, while the third placed were Vaslui. However, at the end of the season Timișoara were being relegated for accumulated debt and by this not allowed to play in the qualifying round of the Champions League, by the Romanian Football Federation. Top scorer of the league was Ianis Zicu of Timișoara with 18 goals.

Steaua Bucharest gained the Romanian Cup again after eleven years, in a final over archrivals Dinamo Bucharest played in Braşov.

In Liga II, Ceahlăul Piatra Neamţ and Petrolul Ploieşti won the two series, with Concordia Chiajna and Bihor Oradea as runners-up. Still, Bihor Oradea were not given a first division license for the following season and were ineligible for promotion. The decision regarding the structure of next season's leagues was still in debate on 20 June.

The champions of the six Liga III series were Bacău, Callatis Mangalia, Chindia Târgovişte, Slatina, Luceafărul Oradea and Maramureş Universitar Baia Mare.

== European competitions ==
=== CFR Cluj ===
The champions CFR Cluj were drawn directly into the group stage of the 2010–11 UEFA Champions League, thanks to a good coefficient of the Romanian association, where they were paired with Basel, Rome and Bayern München. Unluckily they would only achieve a victory over Basel in the first game and a draw with Rome in the last, finishing the group on last place.

Team	Pld	W	D	L	GF	GA	GD	Pts
(Germany) Bayern Munich	6	5	0	1	16	6	+10	15
(Italy) Roma	6	3	1	2	10	11	−1	10
(Switzerland) Basel	6	2	0	4	8	11	−3	6
(Romania) CFR Cluj	6	1	1	4	6	12	−6	4

15 September 2010 Group stage	CFR Cluj (Romania)	2–1	(Switzerland) Basel	Stadionul Dr. Constantin Rădulescu, Cluj-Napoca
20:45	Rada 9'; Traoré 12'	Report	Stocker 45+2'	Attendance: 9,593; Referee: Alan Kelly (Republic of Ireland)

28 September 2010 Group stage	Roma (Italy)	2–1	(Romania) CFR Cluj	Stadio Olimpico, Rome
20:45	Mexès 69'; Borriello 71'	Report	Rada 78'	Attendance: 30,252; Referee: Jonas Eriksson (Sweden)

19 October 2010 Group stage	Bayern Munich (Germany)	3–2	(Romania) CFR Cluj	Allianz Arena, Munich
20:45	Cadú 32' (o.g.); Panin 37' (o.g.); Gómez 77'	Report	Cadú 28'; Culio 86'	Attendance: 64,000; Referee: Martin Atkinson (England)

3 November 2010 Group stage	CFR Cluj (Romania)	0–4	(Germany) Bayern Munich	Stadionul Dr. Constantin Rădulescu, Cluj-Napoca
20:45		Report	Gómez 12', 24', 71'; Müller 90'	Attendance: 14,097; Referee: Serge Gumienny (Belgium)

23 November 2010 Group stage	Basel (Switzerland)	1–0	(Romania) CFR Cluj	St. Jakob-Park, Basel
20:45	Almerares 15'	Report		Attendance: 34,239; Referee: Laurent Duhamel (France)

8 December 2010 Group stage	CFR Cluj (Romania)	1–1	(Italy) Roma	Stadionul Dr. Constantin Rădulescu, Cluj-Napoca
20:45	Traoré 88'	Report	Borriello 21'	Attendance: 12,800; Referee: William Collum (Scotland)

=== Unirea Urziceni ===
Runners up of previous season and champions of 2009, Unirea Urziceni, were defeated in the third qualifying round of the Champions League by Zenit St. Petersburg by 0–1 on aggregate. Moving into the play-off round of the Europa League, they were paired with Hajduk Split. They would get eliminated from Europe after a 5–2 defeat on aggregate. Their home games were played at the Steaua Stadium in Bucharest, because Unirea's stadium did not meet the UEFA criteria. Manager at Unirea in 2010 was Israeli Ronny Levy. The team relegated at the end of the season after their owner withdrew financial support and they had to sell most of their players to pay debts.

27 July 2010 Third qualifying round	Unirea Urziceni (Romania)	0–0	(Russia) Zenit St. Petersburg	Stadionul Steaua, Bucharest
19:30		Report		Attendance: 12,000; Referee: Bruno Paixão (Portugal)

4 August 2010 Third qualifying round	Zenit St. Petersburg (Russia)	1–0	(Romania) Unirea Urziceni	Petrovsky Stadium, Saint Petersburg
18:30	Danny 33'	Report		Attendance: 21,100; Referee: Mike Dean (England)

19 August 2010 Play-off round	Hajduk Split (Croatia)	4–1	(Romania) Unirea Urziceni	Gradski stadion u Poljudu, Split
20:30	Ibričić 39', 66'; Brkljača 78'; Čop 85'	Report	Frunză 34'	Attendance: 35,000; Referee: Antonio Damato (Italy)

26 August 2010 Play-off round	Unirea Urziceni (Romania)	1–1	(Croatia) Hajduk Split	Stadionul Steaua, Bucharest
19:30	Bilaşco 2'	Report	Vukušić 88'	Attendance: 918; Referee: Claudio Circhetta (Switzerland)

=== Vaslui ===
Third placed team Vaslui were drawn against Lille in the Europa League play-off round and they were eliminated after losing 0–2 in the away leg.

19 August 2010 Play-off round	Vaslui (Romania)	0–0	(France) Lille	Stadionul Municipal, Vaslui
19:00		Report		Attendance: 3,821; Referee: Bülent Yıldırım (Turkey)

26 August 2010 Play-off round	Lille (France)	2–0	(Romania) Vaslui	Stadium Nord Lille Métropole, Villeneuve-d'Ascq
20:45	Cabaye 69' (pen.); Chedjou 80'	Report		Attendance: 16,876; Referee: Tom Harald Hagen (Norway)

=== Steaua Bucharest ===
Steaua Bucharest was the most successful Romanian team in the European competitions this season. They were drawn against Grasshopper in the Europa League play-off round and managed to qualify for the second time in the group stage, after passing the Swiss team on penalty shoot-out. There, they were drawn with Liverpool, Napoli and Utrecht. They managed to gain six points in the group, finishing third. Among the notable matches there was 3–1 home victory against Utrecht, a 1–1 draw at home against Liverpool, but also a slipped away victory after a 3–3 draw at home with Napoli, Cavani scoring the equaliser goal in the 98th minute, followed by a similar scenario in the away game, with Cavani scoring for 1–0 in 93rd minute.

19 August 2010 Play-off round	Steaua București (Romania)	1–0	(Switzerland) Grasshopper	Stadionul Steaua, București
19:45	Stancu 71'	Report		Attendance: 17,971; Referee: Jonas Eriksson (Sweden)

26 August 2010 Play-off round	Grasshopper (Switzerland)	1–0 (a.e.t.) (3–4 p)	(Romania) Steaua București	Letzigrund, Zürich
19:30	Salatić 77'	Report		Attendance: 5,200; Referee: Milorad Mažić (Serbia)
	Penalties
	Smiljanić (penalty missed); Salatić (penalty scored); Abrashi (penalty scored); Hajrović (penalty scored); Adili (penalty missed)		Stancu (penalty scored); Surdu (penalty scored); Angelov (penalty scored); Latovlevici (penalty scored)

Team	Pld	W	D	L	GF	GA	GD	Pts
(England) Liverpool	6	2	4	0	8	3	+5	10
(Italy) Napoli	6	1	4	1	8	9	−1	7
(Romania) Steaua București	6	1	3	2	9	11	−2	6
(Netherlands) Utrecht	6	0	5	1	5	7	−2	5

16 September 2010 Group stage	Liverpool (England)	4–1	(Romania) Steaua București	Anfield, Liverpool
21:05	Cole 1'; Ngog 55' (pen.), 90+1'; Lucas 81'	Report	Tănase 13'	Attendance: 25,605; Referee: César Muñiz Fernández (Spain)

30 September 2010 Group stage	Steaua București (Romania)	3–3	(Italy) Napoli	Stadionul Steaua, Bucharest
19:00	Cribari 2' (o.g.); Tănase 11'; Kapetanos 16'	Report	Vitale 44'; Hamšík 73'; Cavani 90+8'	Attendance: 10,203; Referee: Marcin Borski (Poland)

21 October 2010 Group stage	Utrecht (Netherlands)	1–1	(Romania) Steaua București	Stadion Galgenwaard, Utrecht
19:00	Duplan 60'	Report	Schut 75' (o.g.)	Attendance: 24,000; Referee: Said Ennjimi (France)

4 November 2010 Group stage	Steaua București (Romania)	3–1	(Netherlands) Utrecht	Stadionul Steaua, Bucharest
21:05	Gardoş 29'; Stancu 52', 53'	Report	Mertens 33'	Attendance: 16,210; Referee: Stanislav Sukhina (Russia)

2 December 2010 Group stage	Steaua București (Romania)	1–1	(England) Liverpool	Stadionul Steaua, Bucharest
19:00	Bonfim 61'	Report	Jovanović 19'	Attendance: 13,639; Referee: Bülent Yıldırım (Turkey)

15 December 2010 Group stage	Napoli (Italy)	1–0	(Romania) Steaua București	Stadio San Paolo, Naples
21:05	Cavani 90+3'	Report		Attendance: 40,631; Referee: Pavel Kralovec (Czech Republic)

=== Timișoara ===
Fifth placed team Timișoara were drawn in the third qualifying round of the Europa League against MyPa from Finland, which they surpassed 5–4 on aggregate, after a spectacular comeback from three goals down in the second leg. However, in the play-off round they were drawn against Manchester City and were defeated twice in a row, 0–1 and 0–2. At the end of the season, although finishing second, the team is relegated for unpaid debts, putting an end to their nine-year spell in the top division.

29 July 2010 Third qualifying round	MYPA (Finland)	1–2	(Romania) Timișoara	Saviniemi, Anjalankoski
18:00	Ricketts 50'	Report	Tameş 34'; Axente 74'	Referee: David Mckeon (Ireland)

5 August 2010 Third qualifying round	Timișoara (Romania)	3–3	(Finland) MYPA	Stadionul Dan Păltinişanu, Timișoara
19:30	Axente 53'; Zicu 80'; Čišovský 90+2'	Report	Äijälä 18'; Ricketts 20', 25'	Attendance: 8,000; Referee: Artyom Kuchin (Kazakhstan)

19 August 2010 Play-off round	Timișoara (Romania)	0–1	(England) Manchester City	Stadionul Dan Păltinişanu, Timișoara
21:00		Report	Balotelli 72'	Attendance: 28,000; Referee: Florian Meyer (Germany)

26 August 2010 Play-off round	Manchester City (England)	2–0	(Romania) Timișoara	City of Manchester Stadium, Manchester
21:00	Wright-Phillips 43'; Boyata 59'	Report		Attendance: 23,542; Referee: Manuel de Sousa (Portugal)

=== Dinamo Bucharest ===
Dinamo Bucharest benefited from the fact that 2010 Romanian Cup winners were placed first and third in the league, so that one more Europa League spot was awarded for the team on sixth place. They started in the second qualifying round with a tie against Moldovan side Olimpia Bălţi. After a 2–0 victory in the away game played in Chişinău, it followed a 5–1 win at home. Next team they were drawn against, in the third qualifying round, were the Croats from Hajduk Split. It was the tie prior to the encounter with Unirea Urziceni and Dinamo were eliminated by 3–4 on aggregate after they won 3–1 at home and lost 0–3 away.

15 July 2010 Second qualifying round	Olimpia (Moldova)	0–2	(Romania) Dinamo București	Zimbru Stadium, Chişinău
18:00		Report	Pulhac 41'; Ganea 83'	Attendance: 6,300; Referee: Michael Koukoulakis (Greece)

22 July 2010 Second qualifying round	Dinamo București (Romania)	5–1	(Moldova) Olimpia	Stadionul Dinamo, Bucharest
19:45	Orlovski 4' (o.g.); Adrian Cristea 32'; N'Doye 45'; Munteanu 59'; Torje 63' (pen.)	Report	Adaramola 90'	Attendance: 4,367; Referee: Antonio Damato (Italy)

29 July 2010 Third qualifying round	Dinamo București (Romania)	3–1	(Croatia) Hajduk Split	Stadionul Dinamo, Bucharest
20:00	Andrei Cristea 6' (pen.); Garat 40'; Koné 70'	Report	Tomasov 64'	Referee: Lee Probert (England)

5 August 2010 Third qualifying round	Hajduk Split (Croatia)	3–0	(Romania) Dinamo București	Gradski Stadion, Split
20:30	Vukušić 12'; Brkljača 23'; Tomasov 38'	Report		Attendance: 25,000; Referee: Carlos Xistra (Portugal)

== Men's national team ==
On June 4, 2011, Răzvan Lucescu resigned from the helm of the national team, following a two-year term, to take charge at Rapid Bucharest. Victor Piţurcă, the manager before Lucescu, was hired again as the head coach, with a contract valid until November 30, 2015. The aim will be qualification to Euro 2016.

=== Friendly matches ===
11 August 2010	Turkey	2–0	Romania	Istanbul, Turkey
21:15 UTC+3	Emre 82' (pen.); Turan 86'	Report		Stadium: Şükrü Saracoğlu Stadium; Attendance: 15,000; Referee: Milorad Mazić (Serbia)

17 November 2010	Romania	1–1	Italy	Klagenfurt, Austria
21:30 UTC+1	Marica 34'	Report	Marica 82' (o.g.)	Stadium: Hypo-Arena; Attendance: 5,436; Referee: Thomas Einwaller (Austria)

8 February 2011	Ukraine	2–2	Romania	Paralimni, Cyprus
20:30 UTC	Rakitskiy 24'; Milevskyi 31'	Report	Alexa 33' 44'	Stadium: Paralimni Stadium; Attendance: 1,000; Referee: Stefan Johannesson (Sweden)

9 February 2011	Cyprus	1–1	Romania	Paralimni, Cyprus
20:30 UTC	Konstantinou 84'	Report	Torje 54'	Stadium: Paralimni Stadium; Attendance: 2,500; Referee: Viktor Shvetov (Ukraine)

7 June 2011	Brazil	1–0	Romania	São Paulo, Brazil
21:55 UTC-2	Fred 22'	Report		Stadium: Estádio do Pacaembu; Attendance: 30,050; Referee: Sergio Pezzotta (Argentina)

11 June 2011	Paraguay	2–0	Romania	Asunción, Paraguay
18:00 UTC-4	Valdez 2'; Santa Cruz 28'	Report		Stadium: Estadio Defensores del Chaco; Attendance: 10,000; Referee: Evandro Rogerio Román (Brazil)

Win Draw Loss

=== Euro 2012 Qualifying ===
The Romania men's national team were drawn into UEFA Euro 2012 qualifying Group D. Group D fixtures were negotiated between the participants at a meeting in Luxembourg on 19 February 2010.

3 September 2010	Romania	1–1	Albania	Piatra Neamţ, Romania
21:00 UTC+3	Stancu 80'	Report	Muzaka 87'	Stadium: Ceahlăul Stadium; Attendance: 13,000; Referee: Robert Schörgenhofer (Austria)

7 September 2010	Belarus	0–0	Romania	Minsk, Belarus
20:30 UTC+3		Report		Stadium: Dynama Stadium; Attendance: 20,000; Referee: Pavel Kralovec (Czech Republic)

9 October 2010	France	2–0	Romania	Saint-Denis, France
21:00 UTC+2	Rémy 83'; Gourcuff 90+3'	Report		Stadium: Stade de France; Attendance: 79,299; Referee: Pedro Proença (Portugal)

26 March 2011	Bosnia and Herzegovina	2–1	Romania	Zenica, Bosnia and Herzegovina
19:15 UTC+1	Ibišević 63'; Džeko 83'	Report	Marica 29'	Attendance: 12,000; Referee: Fernando Teixeira Vitienes (Spain)

3 June 2011	Romania	3–0	Bosnia and Herzegovina	Bucharest, Romania
21:00 UTC+3	Mutu 37'; Marica 41', 55'	Report		Attendance: 8,000; Referee: Jonas Eriksson (Sweden)

The home teams are in the left column; the away teams are in the right column. Win Draw Loss
