= Davide Bottone =

Italian footballer (born 1986)

Personal information
- Date of birth: April 11, 1986 (age 40)
- Place of birth: Biella, Italy
- Height: 1.83 m (6 ft 0 in)
- Position: Midfielder

Team information
- Current team: Legnano

Youth career
- Torino

Senior career*
| Years | Team | Apps | (Gls) |
| 2006–2010 | Torino | 19 | (1) |
| 2006–2007 | → Biellese (loan) | 20 | (0) |
| 2007 | → Varese (co-ownership) | 13 | (0) |
| 2008–2009 | → Vicenza (loan) | 36 | (0) |
| 2010 | → CFR Cluj (loan) | 7 | (0) |
| 2010–2013 | Frosinone | 61 | (1) |
| 2013–2015 | Torres | 43 | (5) |
| 2016–2017 | Varese | 26 | (2) |
| 2017 | Nuorese | 8 | (0) |
| 2017– | Legnano | 0 | (0) |

International career
| 2008–2009 | Italy U21 | 2 | (0) |
Medal record
CFR Cluj
| Winner | Romanian Cup | 2010 |
- * Club domestic league appearances and goals

Davide Bottone (born 11 April 1986) is an Italian former footballer who last played as a midfielder for Serie B team Varese.

Bottone was loaned to Biellese in summer 2006 but returned to Turin on 31 January 2007.

He made his U21 debut in a friendly game against Germany in November 2008.

== Honours ==
=== Player ===
- CFR Cluj
  - Liga I - winner (2010)
  - Romanian Cup - Winner (2010)
