= Petre Marin =

Romanian footballer

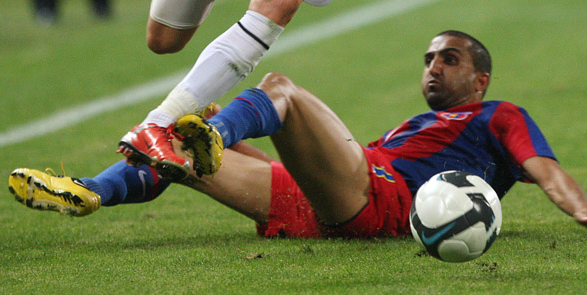
- Marin with Steaua București in 2009

Personal information
- Date of birth: 8 September 1973 (age 53)
- Place of birth: Bucharest, Romania
- Height: 1.69 m (5 ft 6 1/2 in)
- Position: Full-back

Youth career
- 1980–1993: Sportul Studențesc

Senior career*
Years	Team	Apps	(Gls)
1993–1995	Sportul Studențesc	53	(1)
1995–2004	Național București	246	(8)
2001	→ Rapid București (loan)	14	(0)
2004–2010	Steaua București	136	(2)
2010	Unirea Urziceni	4	(0)
2011	Concordia Chiajna	21	(0)
Total		474	(11)

International career
1992–1996	Romania U21	3	(0)
2004–2007	Romania	9	(0)

Managerial career
- 2012–2013: Concordia Chiajna (sporting director)
- * Club domestic league appearances and goals

Petre Marin (Romanian pronunciation: [ˈpetre maˈrin]; born 8 September 1973) is a Romanian former professional footballer who played as full-back.

== Club career ==
Marin made his professional debut in 1993 in Divizia A at Sportul Studențesc. In 1995, he joined Naţional București, where he remained until 2004. During the 2000–01 season, while under contract with Naţional București, he was loaned to Rapid București. In 2004, he was transferred to Steaua București and quickly earned himself a place in the first eleven. His six-year spell with Steaua include two Liga 1 titles, and a UEFA Cup semi-final in 2006. On 17 October 2008, Petre played his 400th match in Liga I.

On 8 June 2010, he signed a two-year deal with Unirea Urziceni making only four appearances because of the financial problems suffered by the club. As of August 2010, he made a total of 453 appearances in Liga I while playing for Urziceni. In February 2011, the 37-year-old defender signed for newly promoted team Concordia Chiajna. On 4 January 2012, he announced his retirement from professional football.

== International career ==
Petre Marin won 9 caps for Romania and three caps for Romania under 21 team.

He made his senior national team debut on 27 May 2004 in a friendly match against Republic of Ireland.

== Career statistics ==
=== International ===
Appearances and goals by national team and year
National team	Year	Apps	Goals
Romania	2004	1	0
Romania	2005	1	0
Romania	2006	3	0
Romania	2007	4	0
Total		9	0

== Personal life ==
Petre Marin is an ethnic Romani. His son, Răzvan is also a professional footballer, currently playing for Super League Greece club AEK Athens.

== Honours ==
=== Player ===
Progresul București

- Cupa României runner-up: 1996–97, 2002–03

Steaua București

- Divizia A: 2004–05, 2005–06
- Supercupa României: 2006

Unirea Urziceni

- Supercupa României runner-up: 2010
