= Gabriel Mureșan =

Romanian footballer (1982–2026)

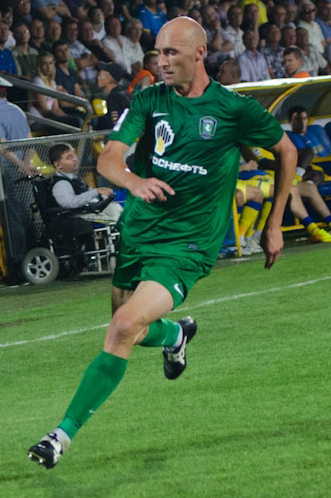
- Mureșan in 2013

Personal information
- Full name: Gabriel Stelian Mureșan
- Date of birth: 13 February 1982
- Place of birth: Sighișoara, Romania
- Date of death: 8 July 2026 (aged 44)
- Place of death: Șaeș, Romania
- Height: 1.88 m (6 ft 2 in)
- Position: Defensive midfielder

Youth career
- 1995–1998: Dealul Mare Sighișoara
- 1998: Gaz Metan Mediaș

Senior career*
Years	Team	Apps	(Gls)
1999–2002	Dealul Mare Sighișoara		
2002	Gloria Bistrița	0	(0)
2003–2004	Mobila Sovata		
2004–2005	Gaz Metan Mediaș	12	(3)
2005–2007	Gloria Bistrița	49	(11)
2007–2013	CFR Cluj	135	(18)
2013–2014	Tom Tomsk	23	(0)
2014–2017	ASA Târgu Mureș	75	(9)
Total		294	(41)

International career
2007–2011	Romania	9	(0)
- * Club domestic league appearances and goals

Gabriel Stelian Mureșan (13 February 1982 – 8 July 2026) was a Romanian professional footballer, who played as a defensive midfielder, and politician.

== Club career ==
=== Early career ===
Mureșan was born on 13 February 1982 in Sighișoara, Romania and began playing junior-level football while being aged 13 at local club Dealul Mare. When he was 17 he went for six months at Gaz Metan Mediaș. Afterwards, he returned to Dealul Mare Sighișoara, starting his senior career in the fourth league. After half a year, Mureșan put his football career on hold, going to work at an amusement park in Germany for a year and a half. He then returned to Dealul Mare, being close to earning promotion to the third league, but eventually Mobila Sovata finished above them. Mureșan had an offer to play for Sovata, but eventually went to first league side, Gloria Bistrița. However, in his half a year spent at Gloria he made no appearances in the league, so he decided to sign with Mobila Sovata.

=== Gaz Metan Mediaș and Gloria Bistrița ===
In 2004, during a friendly played between Mobila Sovata and Gaz Metan Mediaș, Mureșan's style of play impressed the opponents' coach Ioan Sabău who chose to transfer him to the second league side.

In 2005 when Sabău left Mediaș to go to Gloria Bistrița, he took Mureșan with him, and gave him his Liga I debut on 24 September in a 2–1 away loss to Pandurii Târgu Jiu. He scored his first goal on 21 October in a 2–1 win over FCM Bacău. In the following round he netted from a free kick the only goal of a 1–0 away victory against Steaua București. Mureșan would score another goal in a 2–0 win against Sportul Studențesc București, ending his first top-league season with three goals scored in 18 appearances but also receiving three red cards. In the following season he netted a personal record of eight goals.

=== CFR Cluj ===
In the summer of 2007, Mureșan was transferred by CFR Cluj which paid Gloria Bistrița €150,000 and gave five players in exchange. In his first season with CFR, he helped the club win The Double which were the first trophies in the club's history, being used by coach Ioan Andone in 22 league games. He also played in the Cupa României final, Andone sending him in the 81st minute to replace Sixto Peralta in the 2–1 win over Unirea Urziceni. Additionally, he made his debut in a European club competition, playing in both legs of the 3–1 loss on aggregate to Anorthosis in the UEFA Cup second qualifying round. Mureșan then played six games in the 2008–09 Champions League group stage with The Railway Men, including a historical 2–1 victory at Stadio Olimpico against AS Roma, earning the nickname "The Pope from Rome" after managing 23 rebounds in the match. In the same season he won another Cupa României, coach Toni Conceição using him the entire match in the 3–0 win over Politehnica Timișoara in the final.

In the 2009–10 season, Mureșan won with CFR another Double, being used by coaches Conceição and Andrea Mandorlini in 28 games, scoring two goals in both victories against Rapid București. He also played the entire match in the victory at the penalty shoot-out against FC Vaslui in the Cupa României final. Mureșan scored an important goal with a header in a 2–1 win against FK Sarajevo in the 2009–10 Europa League play-off, which helped the team reach the group stage, where he played four games, receiving a red card in a 3–2 loss to Sparta Prague. He started the following season by winning the 2010 Supercupa României, coach Mandorlini using him the entire match in the penalty shoot-out victory against Unirea Urziceni. Subsequently, he played the full 90 minutes in a 2–1 win against Basel in the 2010–11 Champions League group stage.

Mureșan's last trophy won with The White and Burgundies was the 2011–12 title, as coaches Jorge Costa and Andone used him in 28 matches, where he scored four goals, including a brace in a 2–0 win over Oțelul Galați and one goal in the 3–2 derby victory against Universitatea Cluj which mathematically made them champions. Next season he played 10 games in the team's 2012–13 Champions League campaign as they got past Slovan Liberec and Basel in the qualifying rounds, then earned 10 points in a group composed of Manchester United, Galatasaray and Braga, which helped them finish third. Subsequently, they qualified for the round of 32 in the Europa League, where he featured in both legs of their defeat to Inter Milan.

=== Tom Tomsk ===
After six seasons spent at CFR, Mureșan went to play for Tom Tomsk. He made his Russian Premier League debut on 16 July 2013 when coach Anatoliy Davydov used him the entire match in a 2–0 away loss to Amkar Perm. He appeared in 21 league games until the end of season as the team finished in 13th place and was relegated to the second division. There, after playing two matches in the following season, Mureșan left the team.

=== ASA Târgu Mureș ===
Afterwards, he returned to Romania, signing with ASA Târgu Mureș. In his first season, the 33-year-old Mureșan formed a strong partnership in the central midfield with 36-year-old Ousmane N'Doye and in a 1–0 win over Steaua București in October 2014, their aggressive play injured opponents Raul Rusescu and Claudiu Keșerü. Subsequently, they received harsh suspensions from the Disciplinary Commission of the Romanian Football Federation, which were eventually reduced after they made an appeal. By the end of the season he scored five goals in 25 matches, including a spectacular double in a 2–1 win against Dinamo București. He helped ASA fight for the title until the last round when he scored his side's goal in the 2–1 defeat to Oțelul Galați, thus finishing in second place, behind Steaua.

Mureșan started the following season by winning the Supercupa României, coach Dan Petrescu using him the full 90 minutes in the 1–0 victory against Steaua. Afterwards, he played in ASA's 4–2 aggregate loss to Saint-Étienne in the third qualifying round of the Europa League, having a total of 28 appearances with one goal in European competitions. Mureșan made his last Liga I appearance on 15 April 2017 in a 0–0 draw against Poli Timișoara, totaling 260 matches with 37 goals in the competition.

== International career ==
Mureșan made nine appearances for Romania, making his debut on 2 June 2007 when coach Victor Pițurcă sent him to replace Dorel Stoica in the 79th minute of a Euro 2008 qualification game against Slovenia which ended with a 2–1 victory. His second game for the national team was in a 2–2 draw against France in the 2010 World Cup qualifiers and he also played in three matches during the Euro 2012 qualifiers. On 11 July 2011, Mureșan captained the team in a friendly 2–0 away loss to Paraguay. One month later he made his last appearance for Romania in another friendly that was a 1–0 away victory against San Marino.

== Political career ==
In September 2020, Mureșan was elected mayor of Apold, the commune where he spent his childhood, after receiving 63.09% of the votes, while running for PNL. He was re-elected in 2024 with 88.83% of the votes.

== Death ==
Mureșan drowned while swimming in a lake near the village of Șaeș (part of the Apold commune) on 8 July 2026. He was 44.

== Honours ==
CFR Cluj

- Liga I: 2007–08, 2009–10, 2011–12
- Cupa României: 2007–08, 2008–09, 2009–10
- Supercupa României: 2009, 2010

ASA Târgu Mureș

- Supercupa României: 2015
