= Léo Veloso =

Brazilian footballer

Personal information
- Full name: Leonardo Henrique Veloso
- Date of birth: May 29, 1987 (age 39)
- Place of birth: Pedro Leopoldo, Brazil
- Height: 1.79 m (5 ft 10 in)
- Position: Left back

Youth career
- 1997–2007: Atlético Mineiro

Senior career*
Years	Team	Apps	(Gls)
2007–2010	Willem II	40	(0)
2010–2011	CFR Cluj	20	(0)
2012–2013	Chornomorets Odesa	7	(1)
2014	Goiás	11	(0)
2015	Santa Cruz	4	(0)
2016–2017	São Bernardo	6	(0)
2017	Ferroviária	5	(0)
Total		93	(1)
- * Club domestic league appearances and goals as of 20:23, 20 April 2019 (UTC)

Leonardo "Léo" Henrique Veloso (born 29 May 1987) is a Brazilian professional footballer who plays as a left back.

== Career ==
Veloso was born on 29 May 1987 in Pedro Leopoldo, Brazil. During his youth, he played for Atlético Mineiro in Belo Horizonte. Veloso moved to the Netherlands, signing with Willem II, where he made his Eredivisie debut on 30 August 2008, playing the entire match under coach Andries Jonker in a 2–1 home win over Ajax.

One and a half years later he signed with Romanian side CFR Cluj. Veloso made his Liga I debut on 22 February 2010, as coach Andrea Mandorlini sent him in the 64th minute to replace goal-scorer Lacina Traoré in a 1–0 away win over Unirea Urziceni, and his performance was highly regarded. He made a total of 10 league appearances until the end of the season as the team won The Double. Veloso then played in two 2010–11 UEFA Champions League group stage games for The Railwaymen: a 1–0 loss to Basel and a 1–1 draw against AS Roma. In June 2011, he left CFR.

Veloso joined Chornomorets, making his Ukrainian Premier League debut on 3 March 2012, as coach Roman Hryhorchuk used him the entire match in the 1–0 home victory against Illichivets Mariupol. He netted his first goal for them on 7 April in a 3–2 home loss to Zorya Luhansk.

In 2014, Veloso went back to his home country, signing with Goiás. He made his Brazilian Série A debut on 24 August under coach Ricardo Drubscky in a 1–0 home loss to Cruzeiro. Subsequently, he played four matches in the 2014 Copa Sudamericana, as Goiás reached the round of 16 where they were eliminated by Emelec. Afterwards he went to play for Santa Cruz, São Bernardo and Ferroviária, ending his career in 2017.

== Honours ==
CFR Cluj

- Liga I: 2009–10
- Cupa României: 2009–10
