= 2010 Supercupa României =

- Event: 2010 Supercupa României
CFR Cluj	Unirea Urziceni
Liga I	Liga I
2	2
- CFR won 2–0 on penalties
- Date: 18 July 2010
- Venue: Stadionul Dr. Constantin Rădulescu, Cluj-Napoca
- Man of the Match: (Romania) Ciprian Deac
- Referee: Marius Avram (Romania)
- Attendance: 10,800
- Weather: Cloudy night 23 °C (73 °F); 87% humidity

The 2010 Supercupa României was the 12th edition of Romania's season opener cup competition. The match was played in Cluj-Napoca at Dr. Constantin Rădulescu on 18 July 2010, and was contested between Liga I title holders and Supercup defending champions, CFR Cluj and Liga I runners-up, FC Unirea Urziceni. This was the first edition of the Supercup to face the Liga I winners and the league's runners-up, since CFR won the double in 2010. The new format of the competition, in which the double winner plays the league runner-up at home ground was proposed and adopted by Romanian Football Federation the same year.

Cluj won the game after penalties. After regular time the game ended 1–1 after goals of Dominique Kivuvu and again Kivuvu, but this time in the wrong goal. In Extra time Urziceni had the edge early after Laurenţiu Marinescu scored a goal to give them a one-goal lead. In injury time of the 1st half of the extra time Ciprian Deac scored the equalizer to send the game in penalties. In those penalty shootout no player of Urziceni was able to score. Also 2 player of Cluj missed but because Felice Piccolo and Emil Dică scored, Cluj won the trophy which was handed to them by Cluj-Napoca's mayor, Sorin Apostu.

== Match ==
=== Details ===
18 July 2010
20:30 EEST

CFR Cluj	2–2 (a.e.t.)	Unirea Urziceni
Kivuvu 12'; Deac 105+2'	Report	Kivuvu 54' (o.g.); Marinescu 98'
Penalties
Mureşan (penalty missed); Piccolo (penalty scored); Deac (penalty missed); E. Dică (penalty scored)	2–0	(penalty missed) Marinescu; (penalty missed) Maftei; (penalty missed) Brandán; (penalty missed) P. Marin

Stadionul Dr. Constantin Rădulescu, Cluj-Napoca
Attendance: 10,800
Referee: Marius Avram (Romania)

CFR Cluj	Unirea Urziceni

CFR CLUJ:
GK	1	(Portugal) Nuno Claro
LB	66	(Brazil) Edimar		(substituted off) 96'
CB	13	(Italy) Felice Piccolo
CB	20	(Portugal) Cadú (c)
RB	4	(Romania) Cristian Panin
LM	22	(Romania) Ioan Hora		(substituted off) 75'
DM	6	(Romania) Gabriel Mureşan	(yellow card) 76'
CM	19	(Argentina) Emmanuel Culio
RM	8	(Angola) Dominique Kivuvu		(substituted off) 69'
FW	32	(Croatia) Saša Bjelanović
FW	10	(Romania) Ciprian Deac
Substitutes:
GK	44	(Romania) Eduard Stăncioiu
RB	2	(France) Tony		(substituted on) 96'
CB	15	(Brazil) Hugo Alcântara
CM	7	(Romania) Emil Dică		(substituted on) 69'
DM	31	(Portugal) Dani
CF	9	(Ivory Coast) Lacina Traoré		(substituted on) 75'
CF	85	(Romania) Cristian Bud
Manager:
(Italy) Andrea Mandorlini

UNIREA URZICENI:
GK	1	(Lithuania) Giedrius Arlauskis	(yellow card) 110'
LB	36	(Romania) Petre Marin
CB	24	(Romania) Vasile Maftei
CB	6	(Romania) George Galamaz (c)	(yellow card) 120'
RB	19	(Argentina) Pablo Brandán
DM	8	(Romania) Sorin Paraschiv	(yellow card) 82'
DM	26	(Romania) Dan Matei		(substituted off) 46'
LW	11	(Romania) Marius Onofraş	(yellow card) 65'	(substituted off) 110'
AM	20	(Romania) Laurenţiu Marinescu
RW	25	(Romania) Adrian Neaga		(substituted off) 69'
CF	7	(Romania) Marius Bilaşco
Substitutes:
GK	77	(Romania) Cătălin Grigore
CB	17	(Guinea-Bissau) Bruno Fernandes
LB	23	(Romania) Valeriu Bordeanu
AM	10	(Romania) Răzvan Pădureţu		(substituted on) 46'
LM	30	(Romania) Sorin Frunză
CF	9	(France) Maurice Dalé		(substituted on) 110'
RW	22	(Portugal) António Semedo		(substituted on) 69'
Manager:
(Israel) Ronny Levy

MATCH OFFICIALS
Assistant referees:
(Romania) Mircea Orbuleţ
(Romania) Octavian Șovre
Fourth official:
(Romania) Istvan Kovacs

MAN OF THE MATCH
(Romania) Ciprian Deac (CFR Cluj)

MATCH RULES

- 90 minutes.
- 30 minutes extra-time (15 minute intervals)
- Penalty shoot-out if scores level after extra time.
- Seven named substitutes
- Maximum of 3 substitutions.

== See also ==
- 2010–11 Liga I
- 2010–11 Cupa României
