= Felice Piccolo =

Italian footballer

Personal information
- Date of birth: 27 August 1983 (age 43)
- Place of birth: Pomigliano d'Arco, Italy
- Height: 1.88 m (6 ft 2 in)
- Position: Defender

Youth career
- –1998: Rapid Pomigliano
- 1998–2002: Juventus

Senior career*
| Years | Team | Apps | (Gls) |
| 2001–2007 | Juventus | 7 | (0) |
| 2002–2003 | → Lucchese (loan) | 24 | (1) |
| 2003–2004 | → Como (loan) | 35 | (0) |
| 2004–2005 | → Reggina (loan) | 8 | (0) |
| 2005–2006 | → Lazio (loan) | 2 | (0) |
| 2007–2010 | Empoli | 41 | (0) |
| 2009 | → Chievo (loan) | 0 | (0) |
| 2010 | → CFR Cluj (loan) | 10 | (0) |
| 2010–2014 | CFR Cluj | 76 | (2) |
| 2014–2016 | Spezia | 35 | (1) |
| 2016–2018 | Alessandria | 61 | (2) |
| Total | | 299 | (6) |

International career
| 1999 | Italy U15 | 3 | (0) |
| 2000 | Italy U16 | 4 | (0) |
| 2000–2001 | Italy U17 | 10 | (1) |
| 2001 | Italy U19 | 9 | (1) |
| 2002–2004 | Italy U20 | 20 | (1) |
| 2004–2005 | Italy U21 | 8 | (1) |
- * Club domestic league appearances and goals

Felice Piccolo (born 27 August 1983) is an Italian former professional footballer who played as a defender, currently a football agent.

== Career ==
=== Juventus & various loans ===
Piccolo started his football career with the Juventus youth team, although he did not make any appearances for the side and was loaned out to Serie C1 Tuscan side Lucchese in order to gain some first team experience. Piccolo scored once for the club and took part in 24 games.

The 2003–04 season saw the player farmed out once more, this time to Serie B side Como (in a co-ownership deal), being a regular in their first team and playing 35 times. As part of a co-ownership deal, Piccolo moved to Reggina the next year, for €1.25M.

He then spent a brief spell on loan at Lazio in Serie A during 2005–06. Piccolo then returned to Juventus after the co-ownership deal with Reggina was resolved in Juve's favour for undisclosed fees. He was offered a 2-year deal which lasted until June 2008. In the 2006–07 Serie B campaign for the bianconeri, Piccolo played a total of seven matches.

=== Empoli and Chievo ===
In July 2007, half of Piccolo's registration rights was sold to Empoli F.C. for €125K. Teammate Claudio Marchisio also joined the club. In summer 2008, Empoli gained full ownership for €300K.

After played once for Empoli at the start of season, he moved to Chievo on loan, in exchange with Angelo Antonazzo.

==== CFR Cluj loan ====
On 12 February 2010 Chievo loaned the defender out, until the end of season to CFR Cluj.

On 22 June, it was announced that Piccolo was signed by CFR Cluj outright.

=== Spezia and Alessandria ===
On 1 September 2014, the last market day of the summer session, back in Italy by agreeing with the Spezia.

Since the summer of 2016, was acquired by the Alessandria.

== Honours ==
=== Player ===
Juventus

- Serie A: 2001–02
- Serie B: 2006–07
- Coppa Italia runner-up: 2001–02

CFR Cluj

- Liga I: 2009–10, 2011–12
- Cupa României: 2009–10
- Supercupa României: 2010

Alessandria

- Coppa Italia Serie C: 2017–18
