= Dominique Kivuvu =

Angolan footballer (born 1987)

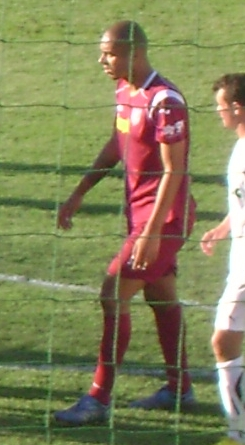
- Kivuvu with CFR Cluj in 2010

Personal information
- Full name: Kisoka Jeadot Kivuvu
- Date of birth: 16 September 1987 (age 39)
- Place of birth: Amsterdam, Netherlands
- Height: 1.87 m (6 ft 2 in)
- Position: Midfielder

Team information
- Current team: ZSGOWMS

Youth career
- 1993–2001: Neerlandia/SLTO
- 2001–2005: Telstar

Senior career*
Years	Team	Apps	(Gls)
2005–2006	Telstar	12	(0)
2006–2010	NEC	74	(1)
2010–2013	CFR Cluj	25	(2)
2012	→ Mjällby AIF (loan)	16	(3)
2015	Kabuscorp	4	(0)
2015–2016	Progresso Sambizanga	5	(0)
2016–2017	FC Oss	28	(1)
2018	DOVO	12	(1)
2018–2019	DUNO	1	(0)
2019–2024	ZSGOWMS	107	(14)
Total		284	(22)

International career
2007	Netherlands U20	7	(3)
2009–2012	Angola	11	(1)
- * Club domestic league appearances and goals as of 19 October 2020

Dominique Kivuvu (born 16 September 1987) is an Angolan former professional footballer.

He formerly played for NEC Nijmegen, CFR Cluj and Mjällby AIF. He is also a former international for the Angolan national team.

== Club career ==
Kivuvu is a midfielder who was born in Amsterdam and made his debut in professional football, being part of the Stormvogels Telstar squad in the 2005–06 season. He later played for NEC Nijmegen in the Eredivisie, Romanian team CFR Cluj and Swedish side Mjällby AIF. He is known for his intense strength and high work rate

=== Angola ===
Kivuvu was released by CFR Cluj in August 2013 after tearing his Achilles tendon. In 2014, he was on trial at FC Eindhoven several times, without this resulting in a contract. In January 2015, he signed with Angolan club Kabuscorp. In June, his contract was terminated after a change of head coach. Later that summer, Kivuvu signed a six-month contract with Progresso Sambizanga.

=== Later career ===
On 8 January 2016, it was announced that Kivuvu would train with his former club NEC to keep his condition up to standard. In the 2016–17 season, Kivuvu played for FC Oss, after having trained with them from March 2016. His contract expired in 2017. In February 2018, he joined DOVO, where he had also trained beforehand. In the summer of 2018, Kivuvu went to DUNO. As of the 2019–20 season, Kivuvu plays for lower-tier amateur club ZSGOWMS.

== International career ==
=== Angola ===
Dominique Kivuvu was the captain of the Netherlands national under-20 football team at the 2008 Toulon Tournament. But being Netherlands-born Angolan, he has been also chased by the Angolan Soccer Association to play for the Angola national football team. He has reportedly accepted the offer to play for Angola at the Nations Cup, to be held in Angola in January 2010.

Kivuvu played his first game for Angola's national team on September 6, 2009, against Senegal.

== Honours ==
=== Club ===
CFR Cluj

- Liga I (1): 2011–12
- Romanian Supercup (1): 2010
