= Emil Dică =

Romanian footballer

Personal information
- Full name: Emil Cosmin Dică
- Date of birth: 17 July 1982 (age 44)
- Place of birth: Scornicești, Romania
- Height: 1.79 m (5 ft 10 in)
- Position: Midfielder

Youth career
- 1992–1998: CSȘ Aripi Pitești
- 1998–2001: Argeș Pitești

Senior career*
Years	Team	Apps	(Gls)
2001–2004	Argeș Pitești	42	(1)
2001–2002	→ Pandurii Târgu Jiu (loan)	23	(1)
2002–2003	→ Internațional Pitești (loan)	11	(0)
2005	Dacia Mioveni	3	(1)
2005–2009	Rapid București	71	(3)
2009–2011	CFR Cluj	30	(3)
2011	Skoda Xanthi	7	(0)
2012	Astana	8	(1)
2012	Mioveni	10	(4)
2013	Rapid București	15	(1)
2013	Ceahlăul Piatra Neamț	3	(0)
2014	Rapid București	24	(2)
2015	Oțelul Galați	6	(0)
2015	Sporting Turnu Măgurele	6	(0)
2016	Baia Mare	3	(0)
2016–2017	Târgu Mureș	21	(0)
2017	Național Sebiș	8	(0)
Total		291	(17)

Managerial career
- 2018: Pandurii Târgu Jiu (sporting director)
- 2018–2019: Energeticianul (sporting director)
- 2020: Muscelul Câmpulung
- 2020: Comuna Recea (sporting director)
- * Club domestic league appearances and goals as of 12:48, 15 June 2021 (UTC)

Emil Cosmin Dică (born 17 July 1982 in Scornicești) is a Romanian former footballer who played as a defensive midfielder.

He played before at Argeș Pitești, Dacia Mioveni, Rapid București, CFR Cluj, CS Mioveni, and Ceahlăul Piatra Neamț, as well as abroad, at Skoda Xanthi, in Greece, and FC Astana, in Kazakhstan.

== Career ==
In February 2012, Dică signed for FC Astana in the Kazakhstan Premier League.

== Honours ==
=== Player ===
Rapid București

- Romanian Cup: 2005–06, 2006–07
- Romanian Supercup: 2007

CFR Cluj

- Liga I: 2009–10
- Romanian Cup: 2009–10
- Romanian Supercup: 2009, 2010
