= Cristian Panin =

Romanian footballer and manager (born 1978)

- Panin lining up before a Champions League match against Chelsea in 2008.

Personal information
- Full name: Cristian Călin Panin
- Date of birth: 9 June 1978 (age 48)
- Place of birth: Arad, Romania
- Height: 1.80 m (5 ft 11 in)
- Position: Defender

Team information
- Current team: CFR Cluj (team manager)

Youth career
- Strungul Arad
- Romvest Arad

Senior career*
Years	Team	Apps	(Gls)
1997–2004	UTA Arad	195	(6)
2004–2013	CFR Cluj	193	(5)
Total		388	(11)

International career
2008–2009	Romania	2	(0)

Managerial career
- 2013–: CFR Cluj (team manager)
- * Club domestic league appearances and goals

Cristian Călin Panin (born 9 June 1978) is a Romanian former professional footballer who played as a defender, currently team manager at Liga I club CFR Cluj.

== Club career ==
=== UTA Arad ===
Panin was born on 9 June 1978 in Arad, Romania. He began playing senior-level football in 1997 at local club UTA in Liga II. He helped them gain promotion to Liga I in the 2001–02 season. Subsequently, Panin made his debut in the competition on 18 August 2002 under coach Ionuț Popa in a 2–1 loss to Național București. The Old Lady finished the season in 16th place, being relegated back to the second league. He spent one more season, then left after coach Ilie Stan wanted to bring new players to the club.

=== CFR Cluj ===
During the summer of 2004, Panin moved to newly Liga I promoted team, CFR Cluj. Under coach Dorinel Munteanu, he played nine games in the 2005 Intertoto Cup campaign as CFR got past Vėtra, Athletic Bilbao, Saint-Étienne and Žalgiris, with the team reaching the final where they were defeated 4–2 on aggregate by Lens.

In the 2007–08 season he helped CFR win The Double, these being the first trophies in the club's history, being used by coach Ioan Andone in 28 league matches in which he scored one goal. Andone also used him the entire match in the 2–1 win over Unirea Urziceni in the Cupa României final. Panin then played four games in the 2008–09 Champions League group stage with The Railway Men, including a historical 2–1 victory at Stadio Olimpico against AS Roma. In the same season he won another Cupa României, coach Toni Conceição using him the full 90 minutes in the 3–0 win over Politehnica Timișoara in the final.

Panin started the 2009–10 season by winning the Supercupa României, as coach Conceição used him the whole match in the penalty shoot-out win against Unirea Urziceni. Subsequently, he helped his side eliminate FK Sarajevo in the 2009–10 Europa League play-off, reaching the group stage where he played in all six games. Panin finished the season by winning another Double with CFR, being used by coaches Conceição and Andrea Mandorlini in 30 games. He also played the entire match in the victory at the penalty shoot-out against FC Vaslui in the Cupa României final.

He won the 2010 Supercupa României, following another penalty shoot-out victory against Unirea Urziceni in which coach Mandorlini played him for the entire match. Afterwards, he played five matches in the 2010–11 Champions League group stage, scoring an own goal in a 3–2 away loss to Bayern Munich. Panin's last trophy won with The White and Burgundies was the 2011–12 title, as coaches Jorge Costa and Andone used him in 21 matches. He spent a total of nine seasons with CFR, and despite numerous players, including Swedish international Mikael Dorsin, attempting to replace him, he still remained a key player for the team. Panin made his last Liga I appearance on 26 May 2013 in a 3–3 draw against Astra Giurgiu, totaling 217 games with five goals in the competition and 28 matches in European competitions (including nine in the Intertoto Cup).

== International career ==
Panin played two games for Romania, making his debut on 19 November 2008 when coach Victor Pițurcă introduced him in the 25th minute to replace George Ogăraru in a 2–1 friendly victory against Georgia. His second game was a 3–1 win over Faroe Islands in the 2010 World Cup qualifiers.

== After retiring ==
After retiring in 2013, Panin joined the technical staff of CFR Cluj as a team manager.

== Career statistics ==
=== International ===
Appearances and goals by national team and year
National team	Year	Apps	Goals
Romania
Romania	2008	1	0
Romania	2009	1	0
Total		2	0

== Honours ==
UTA Arad

- Divizia B: 2001–02

CFR Cluj

- Liga I: 2007–08, 2009–10, 2011–12
- Cupa României: 2007–08, 2008–09, 2009–10
- Supercupa României: 2009, 2010
- Intertoto Cup runner-up: 2005
