= Nuno Claro =

Portuguese footballer

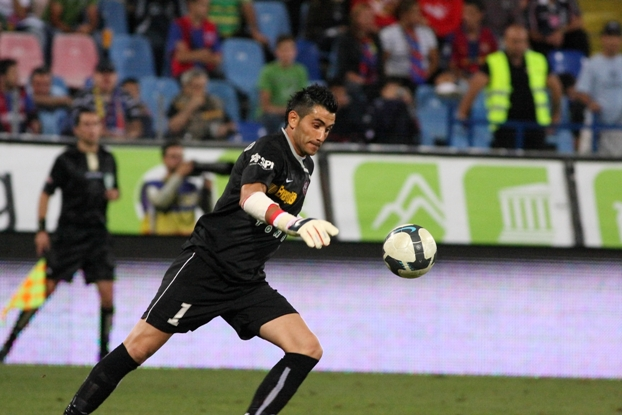
- Claro with CFR Cluj in 2008

Personal information
- Full name: Nuno Claro Simões Coimbra
- Date of birth: 7 January 1977 (age 49)
- Place of birth: Tondela, Portugal
- Height: 1.86 m (6 ft 1 in)
- Position: Goalkeeper

Youth career
- 1987–1994: Viseu Benfica
- 1994–1995: Académico Viseu

Senior career*
Years	Team	Apps	(Gls)
1995–1997	Académico Viseu	0	(0)
1997–1999	Vitória Guimarães	0	(0)
1997–1999	→ Fafe (loan)	31	(0)
1999–2000	Paços Ferreira	1	(0)
2000–2001	Trofense	12	(0)
2001–2003	Gondomar	57	(0)
2003–2006	Moreirense	28	(0)
2006	Nelas	10	(0)
2007	Paços Ferreira	0	(0)
2007–2013	CFR Cluj	77	(0)
2013–2014	Poli Timișoara	30	(0)
2014–2016	Olt Slatina	32	(0)
Total		278	(0)

Managerial career
- 2017–2019: Paxos
- 2021–2022: Gaz Metan Mediaș II
- * Club domestic league appearances and goals

Nuno Claro Simões Coimbra (born 7 January 1977), known as Nuno Claro, is a Portuguese former professional footballer who played as a goalkeeper.

== Club career ==
Claro was born in Tondela, Viseu District. During his Portuguese career, he played almost always in the lower leagues (Segunda Liga or lower), starting out at local club Académico de Viseu FC. His Primeira Liga input consisted of 13 games with Moreirense F.C. from 2003 to 2005, and in January 2007 he signed with F.C. Paços de Ferreira from lowly S.L. Nelas, but could only be third choice, being released after a few months.

Claro transferred to CFR Cluj from Romania in June 2007, joining a host of compatriots and winning the Liga I title in his debut season, contributing 15 matches. He made the bulk of his appearances from 2009 to 2011 (48), winning another national championship in the former campaign; he was released in June 2013 at the age of 36 but continued to compete in the country, first with ACS Poli Timișoara.

== Honours ==
Fafe

- Terceira Divisão: 1997–98

Paços de Ferreira

- Segunda Liga: 1999–2000

CFR Cluj

- Liga I: 2007–08, 2009–10, 2011–12
- Cupa României: 2007–08, 2008–09, 2009–10
- Supercupa României: 2009, 2010
