= Eduard Stăncioiu =

Romanian footballer

Personal information
- Full name: Eduard Cornel Stăncioiu
- Date of birth: 3 March 1981 (age 45)
- Place of birth: Bucharest, Romania
- Height: 1.83 m (6 ft 0 in)
- Position: Goalkeeper

Youth career
- 1987–1998: Sportul Studențesc

Senior career*
| Years | Team | Apps | (Gls) |
| 1998–2006 | Sportul Studențesc | 104 | (0) |
| 2006–2013 | CFR Cluj | 83 | (0) |
| 2014–2016 | ASA Târgu Mureș | 79 | (0) |
| 2016–2018 | FCSB | 5 | (0) |
| 2018–2019 | Universitatea Craiova | 0 | (0) |
| Total | | 271 | (0) |

International career
| 2001–2002 | Romania U21 | 2 | (0) |
| 2008 | Romania | 1 | (0) |

Managerial career
- 2021: Voluntari (GK coach)
- 2023: Chindia Târgoviște (sporting director)
- * Club domestic league appearances and goals

Eduard Cornel Stăncioiu (born 3 March 1981) is a Romanian former professional footballer who played as a goalkeeper.

== Club career ==
Stăncioiu began his career at Sportul Studenţesc, where he played for 8 years. During the summer of 2006 he moved to CFR Cluj as a free agent.

Stăncioiu accomplished a feat when he conceded no goals between rounds 26 and 30 of the Divizia A 2004–05 season. He managed to keep his goal untouched for a total of 457 minutes.

On 15 June 2018, Stăncioiu left FCSB after 2 years with the club.

== International career ==
Stăncioiu played his only game for the Romania national team on 31 May 2008, in a friendly game against Montenegro.

== Career statistics ==
=== Club ===
Appearances and goals by club, season and competition
| Club | Season | League | | | Cupa României | | Cupa Ligii | | Europe | | Other | | Total | |
| Club | Season | Division | Apps | Goals | Apps | Goals | Apps | Goals | Apps | Goals | Apps | Goals | Apps | Goals |
|---|---|---|---|---|---|---|---|---|---|---|---|---|---|---|
| Sportul Studențesc | 1998–99 | Divizia B | 2 | 0 | ? | ? | – | | – | | – | | 2 | 0 |
| Sportul Studențesc | 1999–00 | Divizia B | 9 | 0 | ? | ? | – | | – | | – | | 9 | 0 |
| Sportul Studențesc | 2000–01 | Divizia B | 2 | 0 | ? | ? | – | | – | | – | | 2 | 0 |
| Sportul Studențesc | 2001–02 | Divizia A | 15 | 0 | ? | ? | – | | – | | – | | 15 | 0 |
| Sportul Studențesc | 2002–03 | Divizia A | 18 | 0 | 0 | 0 | – | | – | | – | | 18 | 0 |
| Sportul Studențesc | 2003–04 | Divizia B | 2 | 0 | 0 | 0 | – | | – | | – | | 2 | 0 |
| Sportul Studențesc | 2004–05 | Divizia A | 26 | 0 | 1 | 0 | – | | – | | – | | 27 | 0 |
| Sportul Studențesc | 2005–06 | Divizia A | 30 | 0 | 1 | 0 | – | | – | | – | | 31 | 0 |
| Sportul Studențesc | Total | | 104 | 0 | 2 | 0 | – | | – | | – | | 106 | 0 |
| CFR Cluj | 2006–07 | Liga I | 25 | 0 | 1 | 0 | – | | – | | – | | 26 | 0 |
| CFR Cluj | 2007–08 | Liga I | 15 | 0 | 2 | 0 | – | | 2 (Note: Appearances in UEFA Cup) | 0 | – | | 19 | 0 |
| CFR Cluj | 2008–09 | Liga I | 23 | 0 | 0 | 0 | – | | 5 (Note: Appearances in UEFA Champions League) | 0 | – | | 28 | 0 |
| CFR Cluj | 2009–10 | Liga I | 5 | 0 | 0 | 0 | – | | 0 | 0 | 0 | 0 | 5 | 0 |
| CFR Cluj | 2010–11 | Liga I | 5 | 0 | 2 | 0 | – | | 3 | 0 | 0 | 0 | 10 | 0 |
| CFR Cluj | 2011–12 | Liga I | 2 | 0 | 0 | 0 | – | | – | | – | | 2 | 0 |
| CFR Cluj | 2012–13 | Liga I | 6 | 0 | 1 | 0 | – | | 0 | 0 | 1 (Note: Appearance in Supercupa României) | 0 | 8 | 0 |
| CFR Cluj | 2013–14 | Liga I | 2 | 0 | 0 | 0 | – | | – | | – | | 2 | 0 |
| CFR Cluj | Total | | 83 | 0 | 6 | 0 | – | | 10 | 0 | 1 | 0 | 100 | 0 |
| ASA Târgu Mureș | 2013–14 | Liga II | 9 | 0 | – | | – | | – | | – | | 9 | 0 |
| ASA Târgu Mureș | 2014–15 | Liga I | 31 | 0 | 2 | 0 | 0 | 0 | – | | – | | 33 | 0 |
| ASA Târgu Mureș | 2015–16 | Liga I | 34 | 0 | 3 | 0 | 0 | 0 | 2 (Note: Appearances in UEFA Europa League) | 0 | 1 | 0 | 40 | 0 |
| ASA Târgu Mureș | 2016–17 | Liga I | 5 | 0 | – | | 1 | 0 | – | | – | | 6 | 0 |
| ASA Târgu Mureș | Total | | 79 | 0 | 5 | 0 | 1 | 0 | 2 | 0 | 1 | 0 | 88 | 0 |
| FCSB | 2016–17 | Liga I | 5 | 0 | 0 | 0 | 1 | 0 | 0 | 0 | – | | 6 | 0 |
| FCSB | 2017–18 | Liga I | 0 | 0 | 0 | 0 | – | | 0 | 0 | – | | 0 | 0 |
| FCSB | Total | | 5 | 0 | 0 | 0 | 1 | 0 | 0 | 0 | – | | 6 | 0 |
| Universitatea Craiova | 2018–19 | Liga I | 0 | 0 | 0 | 0 | – | | – | | – | | 0 | 0 |
| Career total | | | 271 | 0 | 13 | 0 | 2 | 0 | 12 | 0 | 2 | 0 | 300 | 0 |

=== International ===
Appearances and goals by national team and year
| National team | Year | Apps | Goals |
|---|---|---|---|
| Romania | 2008 | 1 | 0 |
| Total | | 1 | 0 |

== Honours ==
Sportul Studențesc

- Divizia B: 2000–01, 2003–04

CFR Cluj

- Liga I: 2007–08, 2009–10, 2011–12
- Cupa României: 2007–08, 2008–09, 2009–10
- Supercupa României: 2009, 2010

ASA Târgu Mureș

- Supercupa României: 2015
