= Cristian Bud =

Romanian footballer

Personal information
- Full name: Cristian Ionuț Bud
- Date of birth: 26 June 1985 (age 41)
- Place of birth: Baia Mare, Romania
- Height: 1.85 m (6 ft 1 in)
- Position: Forward

Youth career
- 1995–2004: Baia Mare

Senior career*
Years	Team	Apps	(Gls)
2004–2008	Liberty Salonta	52	(25)
2009	Gaz Metan Mediaș	31	(11)
2010–2013	CFR Cluj	39	(9)
2011–2012	→ Gaz Metan Mediaș (loan)	20	(6)
2013	→ Bihor Oradea (loan)	10	(7)
2013	Debrecen	0	(0)
2013	Gaz Metan Mediaș	10	(1)
2014	Pandurii Târgu Jiu	6	(0)
2014–2015	Milsami Orhei	37	(14)
2016–2017	CFR Cluj	41	(16)
2017	ACS Poli Timișoara	5	(0)
2017–2018	Concordia Chiajna	19	(3)
2018	Yverdon Sport	14	(5)
2019	Hermannstadt	0	(0)
2019	CFR Cluj	4	(0)
2019	Turris Turnu Măgurele	14	(1)
2020	Minaur Baia Mare	1	(4)
2020–2021	Dunărea Călărași	24	(3)
2022	Făurei	6	(1)
2022–2023	ASFC Dinamo	11	(23)
2023–2024	Speed Academy Pitești	9	(4)
Total		355	(133)
- * Club domestic league appearances and goals

Cristian Ionuț Bud (Romanian pronunciation: [kristiˈan joˈnuts ˈbud]; born 26 June 1985) is a Romanian former professional footballer who played as a forward.

== Career ==
=== Early years ===
In 2004, Bud began his career with his hometown club Liberty Salonta after being bought from Sporting Baia Mare's Academy. In the same year, he started playing with the senior side scoring vital goals in 52 appearances and scoring 25 goals. In his last season with the club, they managed to promote to Liga 1 after years in the second division.

=== Gaz Metan Mediaș ===
Following the success at Liberty, in 2009–2010 season, Bud signed a two years contract with Gaz Metan Mediaș for a fee of 500,000 Euro, becoming their most expensive ever player. Bud was a regular starter in his stint at the club scoring 11 goals in Liga 1 helping the club stay in the first division.

=== CFR Cluj ===
In December 2010, Bud was bought by CFR Cluj becoming a very important player for the club. In his first season, he won the Romanian Championship and the Romanian Cup. After missing most of the 2011 season due to injury, Bud was loaned back to Gaz Metan Medias scoring 6 times for them.

=== Bihor Oradea ===
In 2013, Bud was loaned to FC Bihor Oradea making 10 appearances and scoring 7 goals in all competitions.

=== Debrecen ===
In 2013 he signed with Hungarian champions Debrecen becoming their first summer signing. Not being able to accommodate himself with the life in Hungary, Bud decided to end the contract by mutual consent going back to Gaz Metan Medias.

=== Return to Gaz Metan Mediaș ===
In the summer of 2013, Bud returned to the club again signing a one-year contract. Although most of the year he missed games because of an injury, Bud managed to make 10 appearances for the club scoring 5 goals.

=== Pandurii Târgu Jiu ===
At the insistence of the coach, Cristian Pustai, Bud signed a two-year contract with the Liga 1 club making 6 appearances for the club.

=== Milsami Orhei ===
After ending its contract with Pandurii Targu Jiu, Bud signed a three-year deal with the Moldovan Champions Milsami Orhei. In his first season, he made 20 appearances for the club and managed to eliminate Ludogorets Razgrad in the second qualifying round of the 2015–16 UEFA Champions League and winning the Moldovan Championship. In his two-years with the club, Bud managed to score 16 goals in 37 appearances.

=== Return to CFR Cluj ===
After two successful seasons in Moldova, Bud signed with his former team CFR Cluj becoming the club's top scorer with 16 goals in 41 appearances. He was Digi Sport Player of the Month for September 2016.

=== Poli Timișoara ===
At the beginning of 2017, it was announced that Bud signed a contract with Poli Timișoara for an undisclosed fee. Bud went on to play five times and because of differences with the club's financial status, Bud decided to end his contract with the club.

=== Concordia Chiajna ===
In the summer of 2017, he signed with Concordia Chiajna becoming their first summer signing being a priority transfer for the coach Vasile Miriuță. His first goal for the club came in a win against Juventus București.

=== Hermannstadt and third spell at CFR Cluj ===
In February 2019, he returned to CFR Cluj.

=== Turris-Oltul Turnu Măgurele ===
On 28 June 2019 Bud signed a contract with Liga II side Turris-Oltul Turnu Măgurele.

== Honours ==
Liberty Salonta

- Divizia B: 2005–06
- Liga III: 2006–07

CFR Cluj

- Liga I: 2009–10, 2011-12, 2018–19
- Romanian Cup: 2009–10, 2015–16
- Romanian Supercup: 2010

Milsami Orhei

- Divizia Națională: 2014–15
