= Hugo Alcântara =

Brazilian footballer (born 1979)

- Alcântara before a game with Cluj in 2008

Personal information
- Full name: Hugo da Silva Alcântara
- Date of birth: 28 July 1979 (age 47)
- Place of birth: Cuiabá, Brazil
- Height: 1.90 m (6 ft 3 in)
- Position: Centre back

Team information
- Current team: Dom Bosco (manager)

Youth career
- 1997: União Bandeirante
- 1998: Dom Bosco

Senior career*
Years	Team	Apps	(Gls)
1999	Operário-MT		
2000	Berga		
2000	Botafogo	0	(0)
2001	Mixto		
2001–2005	Vitória Setúbal	103	(4)
2005–2006	Académica	29	(2)
2006–2007	Legia Warsaw	9	(2)
2007–2008	Belenenses	25	(1)
2008–2010	CFR Cluj	47	(6)
2011	Montedio Yamagata	0	(0)
2011	Atlético Paranaense	0	(0)
2011–2012	União Leiria	5	(0)
2013	Grêmio Osasco	10	(1)
Total		228	(16)

Managerial career
- 2014: Dom Bosco
- 2015: Cuiabá (interim)
- 2018: Ação
- 2018: União Rondonópolis
- 2019: Dom Bosco
- 2019–2020: Poconé
- 2020: CEOV
- 2021–: Dom Bosco
Medal record
CFR Cluj
Winner	Romanian Cup	2009
Winner	Romanian Cup	2010
- * Club domestic league appearances and goals

Hugo da Silva Alcântara (born 28 July 1979) is a Brazilian football manager and former player who played as a central defender. He is the current manager of Dom Bosco.

He spent most of his professional career in Portugal, amassing Primeira Liga totals of 138 games and four goals for Vitória Setúbal, Académica, Belenenses and União de Leiria. He also competed in Poland and Romania.

== Football career ==
Born in Cuiabá, Mato Grosso, Alcântara played for several modest clubs in his country, almost all hailing from his native region. In 2000 he was part of Botafogo de Futebol e Regatas' roster, but played in no official games.

In the 2001–02 season, Alcântara moved to Portugal with Vitória de Setúbal, going on to appear in an average of 26 league matches in his four-year spell – 2003–04 was spent in the second division, with promotion – and helping the Sadinos win the 2005 domestic cup against S.L. Benfica (he played the full 90 minutes in the 2–1 final win); he spent 2005–06 with fellow Primeira Liga team Académica de Coimbra, only missing seven contests during the campaign for an eventual 13th-place finish.

After one season in Poland and another back in Portugal with C.F. Os Belenenses, where he was punished with a three-game ban for slapping Kostas Katsouranis of Benfica across the face, Alcântara joined a host of Portuguese (or Portugal-based) players at Romanian side CFR Cluj. He made his Liga I debut on 26 October 2008 in a 1–2 away loss against FC Politehnica Timișoara, and proceeded to be relatively used during his stint as they won five major titles, including the 2010 national championship with 22 appearances and three goals from the player.

In February 2011, Alcântara signed for J1 League club Montedio Yamagata. Before the season started, however, he left the club, in the aftermath of the earthquake in Japan. On 4 April, he joined Clube Atlético Paranaense.

After only a three-month spell, 32-year-old Alcântara returned to Portugal once again, signing with U.D. Leiria on 11 July 2011.

== Honours ==
Vitória Setúbal

- Taça de Portugal: 2004–05

CFR Cluj

- Liga I: 2009–10
- Cupa României: 2008–09, 2009–10
- Supercupa României: 2009, 2010
