= Lacina Traoré =

Ivorian footballer

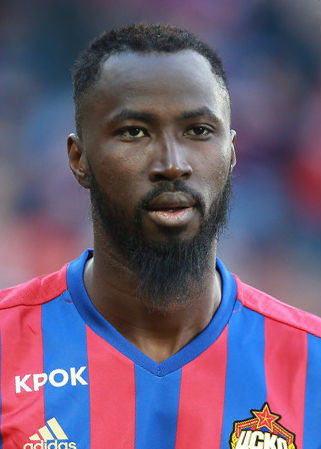
- Traoré with CSKA Moscow in 2016

Personal information
- Full name: Lacina Emeghara Traoré
- Date of birth: 20 May 1990 (age 36)
- Place of birth: Abidjan, Ivory Coast
- Height: 2.03 m (6 ft 8 in)
- Position: Forward

Youth career
- 2006–2007: ASEC Mimosas

Senior career*
Years	Team	Apps	(Gls)
2007–2008	Stade d'Abidjan	27	(6)
2008–2011	CFR Cluj	44	(14)
2011–2012	Kuban Krasnodar	38	(18)
2012–2014	Anzhi Makhachkala	29	(13)
2014–2018	AS Monaco	25	(4)
2014	→ Everton (loan)	2	(1)
2015	→ Monaco II	1	(1)
2016	→ CSKA Moscow (loan)	14	(5)
2017	→ Sporting Gijón (loan)	8	(2)
2017–2018	→ Amiens (loan)	18	(0)
2019	Újpest	9	(3)
2019–2020	CFR Cluj	11	(2)
2020–2021	Bandırmaspor	14	(0)
2022	Varzim	5	(0)
Total		244	(67)

International career
2011	Ivory Coast U23	5	(3)
2012–2015	Ivory Coast	13	(4)
Medal record
Representing Ivory Coast
Men's football
Africa Cup of Nations
Winner	2015 Equatorial Guinea
- * Club domestic league appearances and goals

Lacina Emeghara Traoré (born 20 May 1990) is an Ivorian former professional footballer who played as a forward. He was nicknamed "The Big Tree", due to his 2.03m frame, which put him among the tallest professional footballers.

== Club career ==
=== Early career ===
Traoré was born on 20 May 1990 in Abidjan, Ivory Coast and began playing junior-level football at ASEC Mimosas. He started his senior career at Stade d'Abidjan in 2007.

=== CFR Cluj ===
In January 2008, Traoré, along with compatriots Ousmane Viera, Emmanuel Koné and Lamine Camara, moved to Romania to join CFR Cluj. At the beginning of this stint, Traoré played for the club's satellite team and coach Sorin Oncică said about him: "For now, he isn't accustomed to a professional training regimen. In terms of talent—specifically the technique he possesses for his height—I would compare him to the Nigerian player Kanu. The important thing is that he has a great deal of talent and a foundation upon which you can build". Traoré made his Liga I debut for the senior squad on 4 April 2009, when coach Aleš Jindra sent him in the 90th minute to replace Yssouf Koné in a 3–0 victory against FC Vaslui. He scored his first goal in the competition on 18 April in a 1–0 victory against Farul Constanța. At the end of the season, the team won the Cupa României, but coach Toni Conceição did not use Traoré in the 3–0 win over Politehnica Timișoara in the final.

In the 2009–10 season, Traoré helped the club win The Double, being used by coaches Conceição and Andrea Mandorlini in 25 games, scoring six goals. Additionally, he found the net against both Copenhagen in a win and Sparta Prague in a loss during the 2009–10 Europa League campaign. He started the following season by winning the 2010 Supercupa României, as coach Mandorlini introduced him in the 75th minute to substitute Ioan Hora in the victory against Unirea Urziceni. Subsequently, Traoré played six matches in the 2010–11 Champions League group stage, scoring two goals, one in a win over Basel and another in a draw against AS Roma. He also scored a league goal following a pass from Léo Veloso in a 1–1 derby draw against Universitatea Cluj.

=== Kuban Krasnodar ===
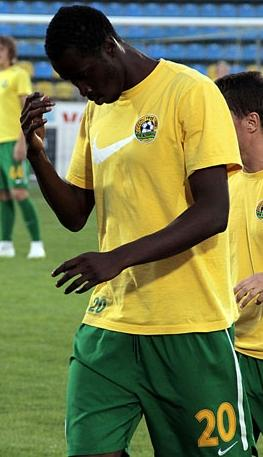
Traoré training with Kuban

In February 2011, Traoré was transferred from CFR to Kuban Krasnodar for a reported fee of €6 million. He made his Russian Premier League debut on 13 March 2011, when coach Dan Petrescu sent him in the 75th minute to replace Sergei Davydov in a 2–0 loss to Rubin Kazan. On 2 April 2011, Traoré scored his first league goal of the season and provided an assist for Vladislav Kulik in a 3–1 victory against Spartak Moscow. Traoré then scored his first brace in the Russian league and provided an assist for Gheorghe Bucur in a 3–2 win over Amkar Perm.

By May 2011, Traoré was voted player of the month by the club for his recent strong form. His further impressive performances earned him player of the month in September and November. In his first season at Kuban, Traoré made 38 league appearances and scored a career-best 18 goals. During this time, Traoré was compared to his compatriot striker Seydou Doumbia.

=== Anzhi Makhachkala ===
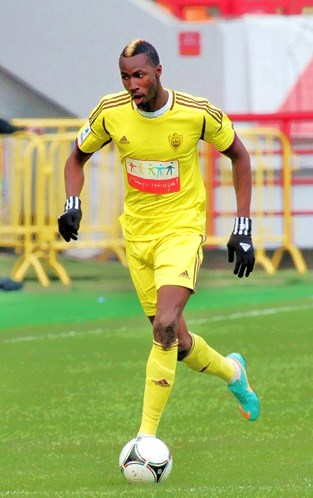
Traoré playing for Anzhi in 2012

On 29 June 2012, Anzhi reported that they had signed Traoré from Kuban for an undisclosed fee. Media reports estimated the transfer fee to be around €18 million. Upon joining the club, Traoré was given the number 19 shirt and formed an offensive partnership with Samuel Eto'o.

Traoré scored his first goal for Anzhi in the first round of the 2012–13 season in a 2–1 win against former club Kuban Krasnodar. Subsequently, he netted one goal against Honvéd and two goals against AZ Alkmaar, as his side got past those clubs in the 2012–13 Europa League qualifiers, reaching the group stage. There, he scored once in a 1–0 win over Liverpool. The team reached the round of 32 and Traoré scored a goal that helped his side eliminate Hannover 96 before they were defeated by Newcastle in the round of 16.

Traoré started the 2013–14 season by scoring in a 1–1 draw against Lokomotiv Moscow. However, due to poor results in the first rounds of the season, Anzhi chose to transfer list their whole squad, including Traoré.

=== AS Monaco and loans ===
On 4 January 2014, Traoré signed a four-and-a-half-year contract with Ligue 1 side AS Monaco for a €10 million fee. Shortly afterwards, West Ham United wanted to sign Traoré on loan. Instead, Traoré joined Everton on loan on 24 January 2014 until the end of the 2013–14 Premier League season after his work permit was granted and he was given the number 28 shirt. His debut took place on 16 February under manager Roberto Martínez, and he managed to score the opener in a 3–1 FA Cup win over Swansea City. Traoré injured his hamstring in the warm-up for the game against Chelsea on 22 February 2014, and was ruled out until the final game of the season where he made his only league appearance as an 89th-minute substitute for Romelu Lukaku in a 2–0 victory against Hull City.

After a disastrous spell at Everton, Traoré was given a chance in the first team by new manager Leonardo Jardim upon being recalled ahead of the new season. However, he received a setback when he suffered a hamstring injury that caused him to miss the first nine matches at the start of the season. Manager Jardim commented on Traoré, saying: "He was wounded. He will return. I trust him." Following his recovery, Traoré made his Ligue 1 debut on 17 October 2014 in a 2–0 win over Evian. Traoré scored his first league goal on 9 November in a 1–1 draw against Saint-Étienne. He also made two appearances in the 2014–15 Champions League group stage in a loss to Benfica and a win against Bayer Leverkusen. In the following season, Monaco played in the 2015–16 Europa League group stage, where Traoré equalized for a 1–1 draw against Anderlecht and then scored another goal in a 1–0 win over Qarabağ. On 5 December 2015, he netted a brace in a 2–1 away victory against Bastia. Monaco hosted seventh-tier Saint-Jean Beaulieu on 3 January 2016 in the last 64 of the 2015–16 Coupe de France and Traoré scored four goals in an eventual 10–2 victory, despite being sent off at half time.

Traoré playing for CSKA

On 13 July 2016, Traoré returned to Russia, joining CSKA Moscow on loan for the 2016–17 season. He played as a starter under coach Leonid Slutsky in the 1–0 loss to Zenit Saint Petersburg in the 2016 Russian Super Cup. He scored his first goals for his new club on 10 September in a 3–0 victory over Terek Grozny. On 18 October, he opened the scoring in a 1–1 draw against the team he belonged to, Monaco, in the Champions League group stage. Traoré made his last Russian Premier League appearance on 3 December in CSKA's 4–0 home win over Ural Yekaterinburg, totaling 81 matches with 36 goals in the competition.

On 31 January 2017, Traoré signed a loan deal with Sporting Gijón that ran until the end of the 2016–17 season. He made his debut in La Liga under coach Rubi on 5 February by coming on as a substitute in the 71st minute to replace Roberto Canella, managing to score once in a 4–2 loss to Alavés. He netted his second goal on 19 March in a 3–1 victory against Granada.

On 31 August 2017, Traoré joined Ligue 1 side Amiens on a season-long loan deal. He made 18 goalless league appearances during this stint. Traoré accumulated a total of 43 games and four goals in the French top-league.

=== Újpest ===
In February 2019, he moved to Hungarian club Újpest. He made his Nemzeti Bajnokság I debut on 9 March, as coach Nebojša Vignjević sent him in the 70th minute to replace Donát Zsótér in a 3–2 loss to Haladás. In the following three matches, he scored three goals in wins against Kisvárda, Paks and Mezőkövesd.

=== Return to CFR Cluj ===
On 15 August 2019, Traoré returned to CFR Cluj, reuniting with his former Kuban Krasnodar coach, Dan Petrescu. He scored his first goal since his return on 19 October in a 2–0 victory over Universitatea Craiova. On 2 November, he netted another one in a 3–0 win against Academica Clinceni. Those were his only two goals scored in his 11 league appearances during the 2019–20 season, as the team won the championship. Furthermore, he helped CFR reach the round of 32 of the 2019–20 Europa League, where they were eliminated on the away goals rule after 1–1 on aggregate by Sevilla.

=== Bandırmaspor ===
In September 2020, Traoré went to play for Bandırmaspor. His Turkish second league debut took place on 2 October, when coach Ahmet Yurtsever introduced him in the 89th minute to substitute İshak Çakmak in a 2–1 away loss to İstanbulspor. He played 14 league matches without scoring during the 2020–21 season.

=== Varzim ===
In February 2022, Traoré signed with Varzim. He made his Portuguese second league debut on 8 February, as coach Pedro Miguel sent him in the 87th minute to replace Zé Carlos in a 2–1 away loss to İstanbulspor. Traoré made five goalless appearances during the 2021–22 season as Varzim suffered relegation, and he retired afterwards.

== International career ==
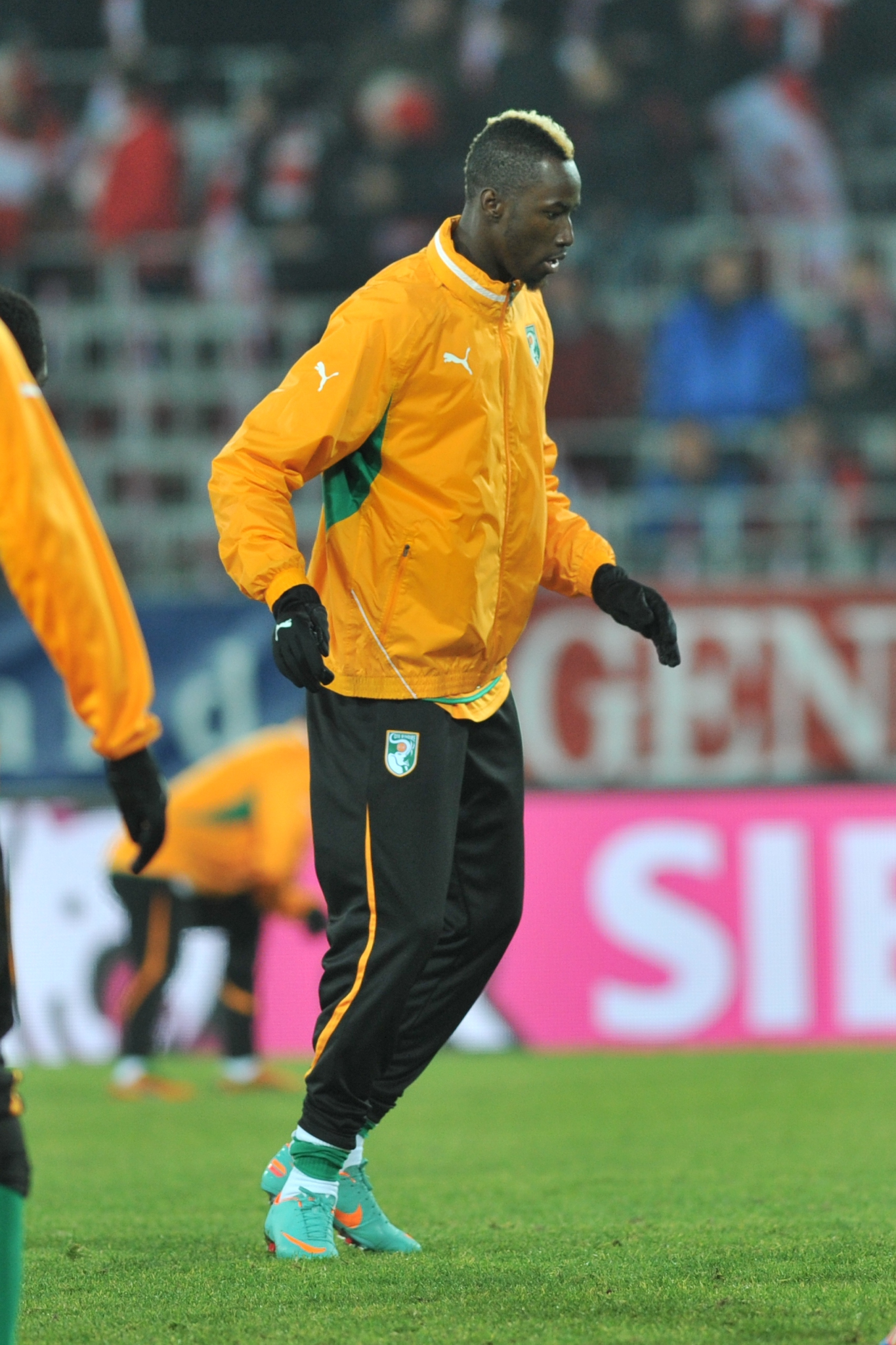
Traoré training for the national team before his debut

In 2011, Traoré played five matches, scoring five goals for Ivory Coast's under-23 national team. Notably, he played in the 2011 African U-23 Championship and scored once in a 3–1 loss to Gabon, as his side failed to get past the group stage.

Traoré was selected by coach Sven-Göran Eriksson in Ivory Coast's preliminary squad for the 2010 World Cup, despite having never previously played for them, though he did not make the final 23-man roster for the tournament. He eventually made his debut for Ivory Coast on 14 November 2012, when coach Sabri Lamouchi sent him on at halftime to replace Wilfried Bony, managing to close the scoring in a 3–0 friendly win over Austria. Traoré was selected by Lamouchi to be part of the 2013 Africa Cup of Nations squad. There, he made two appearances. In the first, he provided an assist for Gervinho's goal in a 3–0 victory against Tunisia, before being substituted by Didier Drogba in the 68th minute. He made his second appearance as an 83rd-minute substitute for Romaric during the 2–1 quarter-final loss to Nigeria.

Traoré played three matches and scored two goals in two wins against Gambia and Tanzania during the successful 2014 World Cup qualifiers. He initially featured as part of the Ivory Coast's World Cup squad, but was left out of the final 23-player squad by Lamouchi. Traoré played two matches in the 2015 Africa Cup of Nations qualifiers, helping his side gain qualification to the final tournament. There, he made a single appearance under coach Hervé Renard—which was also his final match for the national team—during the 3–1 victory against DR Congo in the semi-finals. Ivory Coast ultimately won the tournament, though Traoré did not feature in the final against Ghana. Traoré accumulated a total of 13 matches and four goals for The Elephants.

== Personal life ==
Traoré is a Muslim. He has 16 brothers and two of them were also footballers: Messa, who had a spell in Romania at Politehnica Timișoara, and Lajo Ménéné, who was brought by Traoré to start his European career at CFR Cluj.

Traoré's football idols are Didier Drogba and Emmanuel Adebayor. In 2011, Traoré appeared in the music video for "Our children", a single by the Music Hayk band.

== Career statistics ==
=== Club ===
Appearances and goals by club, season and competition
Club	Season	League			National Cup		League Cup		Continental		Other		Total	
Club	Season	Division	Apps	Goals	Apps	Goals	Apps	Goals	Apps	Goals	Apps	Goals	Apps	Goals
Stade d'Abidjan	2007	Côte d'Ivoire Premier Division	17	2			–		–		–		17	2
Stade d'Abidjan	2008	Côte d'Ivoire Premier Division	10	4			–		–		–		10	4
Stade d'Abidjan	Total		27	6			–		–		–		27	6
CFR Cluj	2008–09	Liga I	6	1	0	0	–		–		–		6	1
CFR Cluj	2009–10	Liga I	25	6	4	2	–		8 (Note: Appearances in the UEFA Europa League)	2	–		37	10
CFR Cluj	2010–11	Liga I	13	7	1	0	–		6 (Note: Appearances in the UEFA Champions League)	2	1 (Note: Appearance in the Supercupa României)	0	21	9
CFR Cluj	Total		44	14	5	2	–		14	4	1	0	64	20
Kuban Krasnodar	2011–12	Russian Premier League	39	18	1	0	–		–		–		40	18
Anzhi Makhachkala	2012–13	Russian Premier League	24	12	3	0	–		8	6	–		35	18
Anzhi Makhachkala	2013–14	Russian Premier League	5	1	0	0	–		2	0	–		7	1
Anzhi Makhachkala	Total		29	13	3	0	–		10	6	–		42	19
Everton (loan)	2013–14	Premier League	1	0	1	1	0	0	–		–		2	1
AS Monaco	2014–15	Ligue 1	6	1	0	0	0	0	2	0	–		8	1
AS Monaco	2015–16	Ligue 1	19	3	2	5	0	0	6	2	–		27	10
AS Monaco	Total		25	4	2	5	0	0	8	2	–		35	11
CSKA Moscow (loan)	2016–17	Russian Premier League	14	5	1	0	–		6	1	1 (Note: Appearance in the Russian Super Cup)	0	22	6
Sporting Gijón (loan)	2016–17	La Liga	8	2	0	0	–		–		–		8	2
Amiens (loan)	2017–18	Ligue 1	18	0	0	0	0	0	–		–		18	0
Újpest	2018–19	Nemzeti Bajnokság I	9	3	0	0	0	0	–		–		9	3
CFR Cluj	2019–20	Liga I	11	2	1	0	–		7	0	0	0	19	2
Bandırmaspor	2020–21	TFF First League	14	0	0	0	–		–		–		14	0
Varzim	2021–22	Liga Portugal 2	5	0	0	0	–		–		–		5	0
Career total			244	67	14	8	0	0	45	13	2	0	305	88

=== International ===
Scores and results list Ivory Coast's goal tally first.

No	Date	Venue	Opponent	Score	Result	Competition
1.	14 November 2012	Linzer Stadion, Linz, Austria	Austria	3–0	3–0	Friendly
2.	14 January 2013	Zayed Sports City Stadium, Abu Dhabi, United Arab Emirates	Egypt	2–1	4–2	Friendly
3.	8 June 2013	Independence Stadium, Bakau, Gambia	Gambia	1–0	3–0	2014 FIFA World Cup qualification
4.	16 June 2013	National Stadium, Dar es Salaam, Tanzania	Tanzania	1–1	4–2	2014 FIFA World Cup qualification

== Honours ==
=== Club ===
CFR Cluj

- Liga I: 2009–10, 2019–20
- Cupa României: 2008–09, 2009–10
- Supercupa României: 2009, 2010

=== International ===
Ivory Coast

- Africa Cup of Nations: 2015
