= Cadú (footballer, born 1981) =

Portuguese footballer

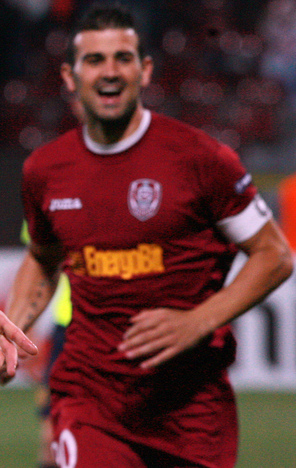
- Cadú with CFR Cluj in 2010

Personal information
- Full name: Ricardo Manuel Ferreira Sousa
- Date of birth: 21 December 1981 (age 44)
- Place of birth: Paços de Ferreira, Portugal
- Height: 1.82 m (5 ft 11 1/2 in)
- Position: Centre-back

Team information
- Current team: CFR Cluj (sporting director)

Youth career
- 1990–2000: Paços Ferreira

Senior career*
| Years | Team | Apps | (Gls) |
| 2000–2004 | Paços Ferreira | 46 | (3) |
| 2000–2001 | → Aliados Lordelo (loan) | 18 | (4) |
| 2001–2002 | → Gondomar (loan) | 34 | (8) |
| 2004–2006 | Boavista | 58 | (3) |
| 2006–2014 | CFR Cluj | 202 | (27) |
| 2014–2015 | AEL Limassol | 12 | (2) |
| 2015–2016 | Gil Vicente | 44 | (7) |
| 2016–2017 | Leixões | 12 | (2) |
| 2017–2019 | Merelinense | 41 | (2) |
| 2019–2021 | Maia Lidador | 37 | (7) |
| Total | | 504 | (65) |

International career
| 2003–2004 | Portugal U21 | 4 | (0) |
| 2004 | Portugal B | 2 | (0) |
- * Club domestic league appearances and goals

Ricardo Manuel Ferreira Sousa (born 21 December 1981), known as Cadú, is a Portuguese former professional footballer who played as a central defender. He is currently sporting director at Liga I club CFR Cluj.

He amassed Primeira Liga totals of 121 games and seven goals over five seasons, with Paços de Ferreira, Boavista and Gil Vicente. He spent eight years of his career in Romania with CFR Cluj, appearing in 255 competitive matches and winning eight major trophies.

== Club career ==
=== Paços Ferreira ===
Cadú was born in Paços de Ferreira, Porto District. joining Paços de Ferreira's youth system aged 8 initially as a forward. He began his senior career in the fourth division with Aliados Lordelo, moving to the third tier with Gondomar for the 2001–02 season also on loan.

Cadú subsequently returned to Paços, making his Primeira Liga debut on 29 September 2002 in a 3–1 home win over Boavista under manager José Mota. He scored his first goal the following 23 February in the 2–0 victory over Gil Vicente, adding two more until the end of the campaign in a 3–1 loss at Beira-Mar and a 1–0 home defeat of Porto.

In the following season, Cadú's team finished in 17th place and was relegated.

=== Boavista ===
In summer 2004, Cadú signed for Boavista. In his debut campaign, he scored twice from 30 appearances for the sixth-placed side.

In 2005–06, Cadú scored in a 1–1 home draw against Vitória de Guimarães, as they eventually achieved the same placement.

=== CFR Cluj ===
On 14 July 2006, Cadú joined CFR Cluj alongside his compatriots Manuel José, Pedro Oliveira and António Semedo, for a €750,000 fee. He made his Liga I debut on 6 August, when player-coach Dorinel Munteanu sent him in as a 79th-minute substitute for Zoran Milošević in a 4–0 home victory over Unirea Urziceni. He scored his first league goal on 20 September, in the 5–1 home win against FC Universitatea Craiova.

Cadú was awarded captaincy in late 2007. During that season, CFR won a double to inaugurate the club's trophy cabinet, and the player contributed four goals in 29 league matches under Ioan Andone; one of these was scored in the last round from a penalty in a 1–0 derby win over Universitatea Cluj that mathematically secured the title.

Cadú made his debut in European competitions by playing both legs of the 3–1 aggregate loss to Anorthosis Famagusta in the 2007–08 UEFA Cup second qualifying round. He then made six group-stage appearances in the following season's UEFA Champions League with the Railway Men, including the historic 2–1 defeat of Roma at the Stadio Olimpico. He claimed his second Cupa României at the end of the latter campaign, featuring the entire 3–0 win against Politehnica Timișoara in the final.

Cadú began 2009–10 by winning the winning the Supercupa României, again starting and finishing the penalty shoot-out victory over Unirea Urziceni and converting the final spot kick. Subsequently, he helped his side to eliminate FK Sarajevo in the Europa League play-offs, reaching the group stage and taking part in five matches. He and his teammates won another double, being used by coaches Toni Conceição and Andrea Mandorlini 28 times and scoring five goals. He again was charged of taking the last shot in a shootout, now against FC Vaslui in the Romanian Cup final, being successful; for these performances, he was voted Central Defender of the Year alongside Unirea's George Galamaz.

Following another penalty shoot-out victory against Unirea Urziceni, Cadú won the 2010 domestic supercup. On 19 October, in the Champions League group phase, he scored a goal and an own goal in the 3–2 defeat away to Bayern Munich.

Cadú's last trophy won with CFR Cluj was the 2011–12 national championship, making 27 appearances under managers Jorge Costa and Andone and scoring on five occasions; the title was confirmed after he netted in the 88th minute of the 3–2 win over Universitatea Cluj. He played ten games in the subsequent Champions League, scoring against Slovan Liberec in the third qualifying round and being part of the squad that earned ten points in the group stage against Braga, Galatasaray and Manchester United; he also featured in both legs of the defeat to Inter Milan in the Europa League round of 32.

On 6 May 2014, he made his 200th Romanian top-flight appearance in a 3–0 away win over Dinamo București, becoming the foreign player with the most after the Romanian revolution. His last in the competition took place nine days later in the 3–1 victory against Gaz Metan Mediaș at the Dr. Constantin Rădulescu Stadium.

=== AEL and Gil Vicente ===
On 2 July 2014, Cadú agreed to a one-year contract at AEL Limassol, making his Cypriot First Division debut on 24 August in a 2–0 away victory against Nea Salamina and scoring in the following two rounds against Ethnikos Achna (2–2) and Doxa Katokopias (4–0). He appeared in the two-legged 3–1 loss to Zenit Saint Petersburg in the Champions League third qualifying round, subsequently taking part in both games of the Europa League play-off as his side was defeated 5–1 on aggregate by Tottenham Hotspur; those were his last appearances in European competitions, where he accumulated 35 matches with two goals.

Cadú returned to Portugal in January 2015, signing with Gil Vicente. He scored his first goal on 25 April in a 2–1 away victory against Académica de Coimbra, remaining with the club in spite of its top-flight relegation.

Cadú took part in 121 games in the Portuguese main division in five seasons, scoring seven times.

=== Later career ===
On 26 July 2016, the 34-year-old Cadú joined Leixões of the LigaPro. Before retiring in 2021, he represented lower-league sides Merelinense and Maia Lidador.

== International career ==
Cadú played four matches for the Portugal under-21 team, adding two appearances at B level.

== Post-retirement ==
After retiring, Cadú worked with Paços de Ferreira as director of football. On 25 April 2026, in the same capacity, he was appointed at his main club CFR Cluj.

== Honours ==
CFR Cluj

- Liga I: 2007–08, 2009–10, 2011–12
- Cupa României: 2007–08, 2008–09, 2009–10
- Supercupa României: 2009, 2010

Individual

- Liga I Central Defender of the Year: 2009–10

== See also ==
- List of foreign Liga I players
