= Alexandru Deaconu =

Romanian football referee

- Born: 3 March 1972 (age 54); Bucharest, Romania

Domestic
Years	League	Role
2000–2012	Liga I	Referee

International
Years	League	Role
2005–2012	FIFA listed	Referee

Alexandru Deaconu (born 3 March 1972) is a Romanian former professional football referee. His Liga I debut was a match between Astra Ploiești and FC Universitatea Craiova on 11 September 2000. He has been a full international for FIFA since 2005 and his first international match was between Khazar Lankaran and Nistru Otaci on 2005–06 UEFA Cup qualifying rounds.
