= Emmanuel Culio =

Argentine footballer (born 1983)

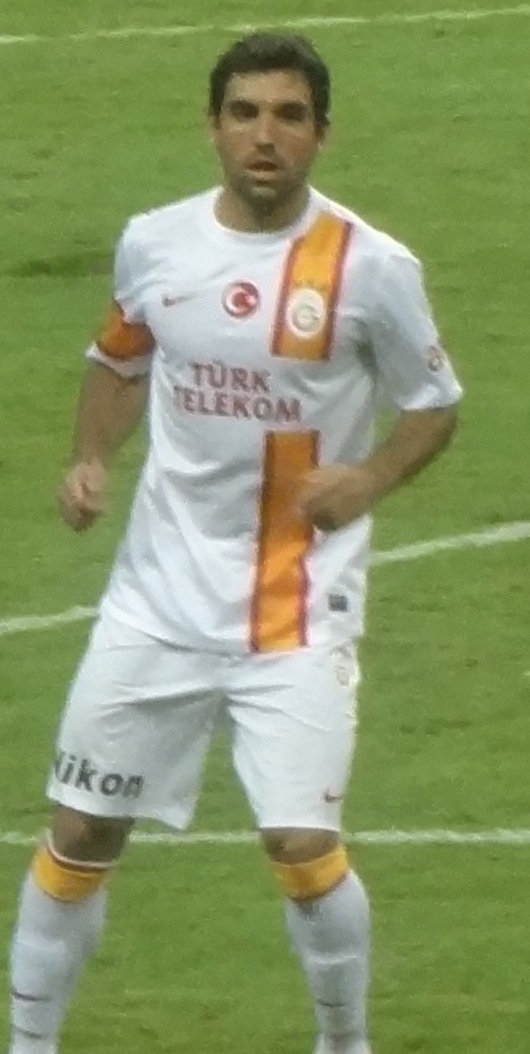
- Culio with Galatasaray in 2012

Personal information
- Full name: Juan Emmanuel Culio
- Date of birth: 30 August 1983 (age 43)
- Place of birth: Mercedes, Argentina
- Height: 1.76 m (5 ft 9 in)
- Position: Midfielder

Senior career*
Years	Team	Apps	(Gls)
2002–2004	Flandria	44	(1)
2004–2005	Almagro	8	(0)
2005–2006	Independiente	1	(0)
2006	Racing Club	3	(0)
2007	Deportes La Serena	19	(2)
2007–2011	CFR Cluj	107	(5)
2011–2013	Galatasaray	15	(4)
2011–2012	→ Orduspor (loan)	30	(4)
2012–2013	→ Mersin İdmanyurdu (loan)	31	(5)
2013–2014	Deportivo La Coruña	18	(2)
2014	Al Wasl	10	(0)
2014–2016	Las Palmas	39	(1)
2016	Zaragoza	12	(0)
2016–2017	Mallorca	35	(4)
2017–2019	CFR Cluj	67	(17)
2020–2021	Quilmes	7	(0)
2021	Flandria	6	(0)
2021	CFR Cluj	8	(1)
Total		460	(46)
- * Club domestic league appearances and goals

Juan Emmanuel Culio (born 30 August 1983) is an Argentine former professional footballer who played as a midfielder. He is one of the most successful foreign players who had ever played in Liga I in Romania. In this regard, he had won six championships, all with CFR Cluj.

== Career ==
=== Early career ===
Born in Mercedes, Buenos Aires, Argentina, Culio began his football career at Flandria after being scouted in the street when he was nineteen. He previously went on trial at Argentinos Juniors despite living 100 km from the capital but failed to earn a contract after his grandmother, who gave him money to travel at Argentinos Juniors, suffered an illness and gave up football as a result. Throughout his time at Flandria, he quickly worked his through to the first team, establishing himself in the starting eleven for the side. He also scored once for the side during his time there.

In 2004, Culio moved to Almagro, where he received a handful of first team appearances, making eight appearances.

=== Independiente, Racing Club ===
On 13 July 2005, he joined Independiente. Culio made his Club Atlético Independiente debut on 7 August 2005, in a 4–2 win over Lanús. However, he only made one appearances for the side, as his time at the club was overshadowed by injuries. It was announced that he was expected to leave the club following the 2005–06 season.

On 25 July 2006, Culio then joined Racing Club ahead of the 2006–07 season. However, he spent the first four months on the substitute bench. On 8 November 2006, Culio made his Racing Club debut, in a 3–2 loss against Banfield. His time at Racing Club was overshadowed when he was involved in an alteration with Cristian Pino, which was eventually solved. Despite this, he went on to make three appearances for Racing Club.

=== La Serena ===
In January 2007, it was announced that Culio joined La Serena in the Liga Chilena de Fútbol.

Culio made his La Serena debut on 26 January 2007, where he started the whole game, in a 1–0 loss against Unión Española. He quickly became a first team regular for the side, making a number of good performances. On 10 March 2007, he scored his first goal, in a 1–1 draw against Everton. His second goal then came on 29 April 2007, in a 2–1 win over Santiago Wanderers. At the end of the 2006–07 season, Culio went on to make nineteen appearances and scoring three times for the side.

=== CFR Cluj ===
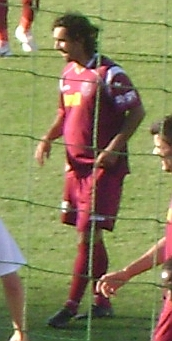
Culio playing for CFR Cluj in August 2010.

On 23 June 2007, it was announced that Culio was transferred to the Romanian club CFR Cluj from La Serena, shortly after compatriot Cristian Fabbiani joined the squad. Four days later, on 27 June 2007, he was presented as the club's new player. Then CFR Club president Iuliu Mureșan reflected how the club signed him, saying: "Culio is an extraordinary player. He is a perfect worker.In 2007 we were looking for a striker and we were recommended Canales, who plays in Chile. We didn't like him and we saw Culio, who was an "ant" in the middle. He was declared the man of the match then. I told the impresario that I liked Culio's number 19. He told us he knew, he was sure we'd want Culio. It cost some money at the time. We were very happy. He is the most family-friendly man I have ever met"

Culio made his CFR Cluj debut under coach Ioan Andone on 1 August 2007, in the opening game of the season, starting the match before coming off as a substitute in the 72nd minute, in a 1–0 win over Oțelul Galați. Since joining the club, he quickly established himself in the first team, playing in the midfield position and was regularly capped player due to his activity on the field and physical endurance. On 7 November 2007, he scored his first goal for the club but was sent–off for a second bookable offence, in a 2–0 win over FC Vaslui. His performance soon earned him praised from Manager Cristiano Bergodi, as well as, earning Romanian's Player of the Month. Culio later helped CFR Cluj win both the league and Cupa României. At the end of the 2007–08 season, making thirty–seven appearances and scoring once in all competitions, Culio earned recognition by his home country.

In the 2008–09 season, Culio started the season well when he scored his first two goals in the UEFA Champions League, on 16 September 2008 against AS Roma. His team won 2–1 and Culio was designated the Man of the Match. This helped CFR Cluj obtain some important points in its first ever Champions League appearance. His performance for the side this season saw him being a subjected of a transfer bid from Russian clubs, such as, FC Moscow and Rubin Kazan. Despite the transfer bid, he stayed at the club throughout January and his performance continued to impress, earning a praise by his then teammate, Eugen Trică and Gheorghe Hagi. Between 4 April 2009 and 18 April 2009, Culio assisted five times in four appearances, including twice against FC Vaslui. This was followed up by scoring his first league goal of the season, in a 1–1 draw against Steaua București on 22 April 2009. Once again, Culio helped the side win the Cupa României Cup for the second time in a row, in which he scored in the final, in a 3–0 win over Politehnica Timișoara. Despite missing out four matches out of the forty–two matches the club has played in the 2008–09 season, he went on to make thirty–eight appearances and scoring four times in all competitions.

Culio lining up before a Champions League match against Chelsea in 2008.

Ahead of the 2009–10 season, Culio continued to be linked a move away from the club, as interests from European clubs increased, including Porto, which saw Álvaro Pereira joined the side. Eventually, he stayed at the club throughout the summer transfer window. In the Supercupa României against Unirea Urziceni, which the game was played for 120 minutes following a 1–1 draw, Culio started the season well when he helped the side win 3–2 in the penalty–shootout despite missing a penalty. After missing two matches, he returned to the first team and played in both legs against FK Sarajevo in the UEFA Europa League Play–Offs, which they won 3–1 on aggregate. Following his return, Culio regained his first team place for the side. He then scored his first goal of the season on 16 September 2009, in a 2–0 win over Copenhagen in the UEFA Europa League Group Stage. Following a 3–2 loss against Sparta Prague in the UEFA Europa League Group Stage on 5 November 2009, Culio was involved in alteration with the club's supporters, which he apologized after the match. On 13 March 2010, he scored his first league goal of the season, in a 2–2 draw against Dinamo București. Later in the 2009–10 season, Culio helped the side win both the league and the Cupa României after beating FC Vaslui 5–4 in penalty–shootout in the final. Despite being out on two occasions during the 2009–10 season, Culio went on to make forty–two appearances and scoring two times in all competitions.

Ahead of the 2010–11 season, Culio, once again, expressed his desire to leave the club. Despite the move never happened, he, nevertheless, helped the side beat Unirea Urziceni in the Supercupa României, after the match went on penalties following a 2 –2 draw throughout extra time. He started the season as a first team regular for the side. On 2 August 2010, Culio scored his first goal of the season, in a 2–0 win over Victoria Brănești. In a 2–1 win over FC Basel in the UEFA Champions League Group Stage Matchday 1, he set up two goals, in which he was praised for his performance. Culio then assisted three times in three matches between 24 September 2010 and 3 October 2010. Then, on 19 October 2010, he scored his second league goal of the season, in a 3–2 loss against Bayern Munich. A month later, on 28 November 2010, he scored again, in a 2–2 draw against Steaua București. By the end of December 2010, Culio was subjected of a transfer bid by Kuban Krasnodar, which was rejected by the CFR Cluj. By the time of his departure, he made twenty–five appearances and scoring three times in all competitions. He also finished the top assists for the Champions League Group.

=== Galatasaray ===
On 6 January 2011, Culio signed with Turkish club Galatasaray for reported €2 million where he was wanted by Romanian coach Gheorghe Hagi.

Culio made his Galatasaray debut on 23 January 2011, starting the whole game, in a 1–0 win over Sivasspor. On 19 February 2011, he scored his first goal for the club, in a 1–0 win over Bucaspor. Since joining the club, Culio quickly adapted at the club, stating that he settled in and got on well with his teammates, supporters (due to his work rate and professional attitude) and the manager. His second goal then came on 18 April 2011, in a 3–2 win over Manisaspor. Despite missing two matches towards the end of the 2010–11 season, he went on to make nineteen appearances and scoring four times for Galatasaray.

Shortly after the end of the 2010–11 season, new manager Fatih Terim made Culio available for transfer and was expected to leave the club in the summer. Two years after joining the club, it was announced on 7 August 2011 that both parties reached an agreement, allowing Culio to mutually leave Galatasaray by having his contract with Galatasaray terminated. As part of the termination, the settlement was reached, with Culio receiving 500 thousand euros.

==== Loan to Orduspor ====
On 5 August 2011, Culio left Galatasaray on loan to Orduspor for €350,000. Upon joining the club, he said of the move: Orduspor fans can not wait to stand out, Orduspor is a great community when I came here better understood. I believe that Orduspor in the Super League will bring sound. I'm waiting for our fans to support us. The last drop of the term for the success of Orduspor'u play.

Culio made his Orduspor debut in the opening game of the season against Fenerbahçe. Since joining the club, he quickly established himself in the starting eleven for the side and was one of the club's key players, alongside Jean-Jacques Gosso. Culio then scored his first goal for the club, as well as, setting up a goal, in a 2–1 win over Eskişehirspor on 15 October 2011. He added two more goals by the end of December. Culio then captained his first match on 25 January 2012 against Kardemir Karabükspor and during the match, he scored, in a 3–2 win. He went on to captain the side three more times. During the 1–1 draw against Beşiktaş on 11 March 2012, he was involved in altercation with teammate Jean-Jacques Gosso; eventually, the situation was resolved and the pair made up.

It was announced on 26 March 2012 when the club decided against taking up options to sign Culio again and expected to return to Galatasaray for the next season. It came after when he criticised the club, leading the club to terminate his loan spell there. Following this, he never played for the side for the rest of the season. Culio went on to make thirty–one appearances and scoring once for Orduspor in all competitions.

On 4 July 2012, it was announced that Culio had returned from Orduspor and back to Galatasaray and training with his original club in the Florya Metin Oktay Sports Complex and Training Center. Fatih Terim had announced last season that if he knew that Arda Turan was going to leave that he would not have sent Culio to Orduspor.

==== Loan to Mersin Idmanyurdu ====
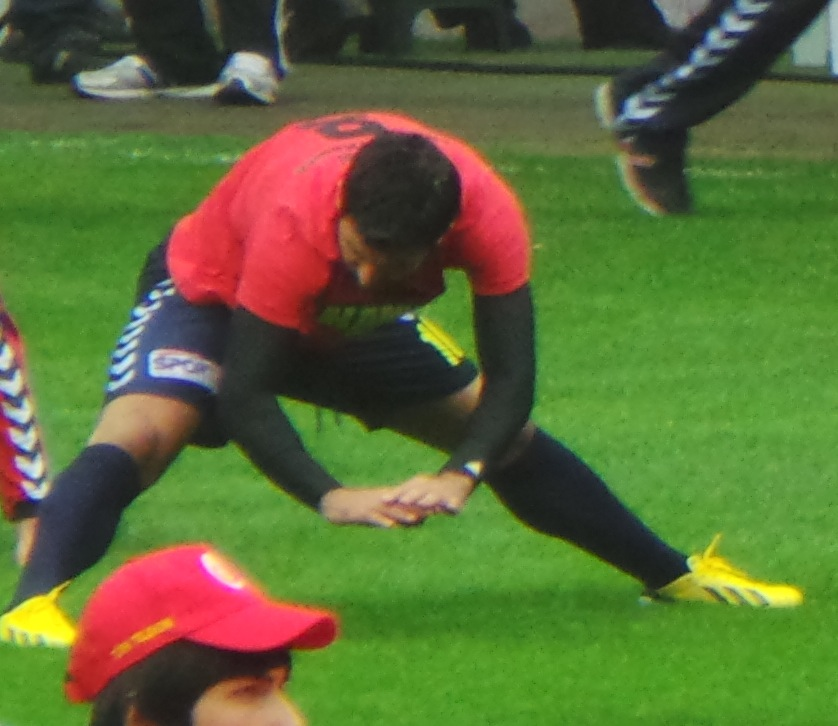
Culio training for Mersin İdmanyurdu in April 2013.

For the 2012–13 season, Culio signed for Mersin İdmanyurdu on a one-year loan deal on 16 August 2012, with an option of paying the transfer fee of €150K by 15 January 2013.

Culio made his Mersin Idmanyurdu debut in the opening game of the season against Orduspor, where he came on as a substitute in the 60th minute, in a 1–1 draw. In the next two follow up matches, he scored goal against Sivasspor and Eskişehirspor, adding his goal tally to two by the end of August. Since joining Mersin Idmanyurdu, Culio became a first team regular for the side. On 27 January 2013, he scored twice, in a 3–0 win over Sivasspor. After scoring his sixth goal against Gençlerbirliği on 17 February 2013, Culio, however, was then sent–off for second bookable offence, in a 2–1 loss against Kayserispor on 3 March 2013.

At the end of the 2012–13 season, making thirty–five appearances and scoring six times in all competitions, Culio left Mersin Idmanyurdu and returned to his parent club.

=== Deportivo La Coruña ===
On 9 August 2013, he signed for Deportivo de La Coruña on an initial one-year deal.

Culio made his Deportivo de La Coruña debut against Las Palmas in the opening game of the season, where he started the match, set up a goal for Pablo Insua and then got sent–off for a second bookable offence, in a 1–0 win. Since joining the club, he quickly established himself in the starting eleven for the side. On 13 October 2013, he scored his first Deportivo de La Coruña goal, in a 1–0 win over Barcelona B. His second goal for the side then came on 24 November 2013 when he scored the only goal of the game, with a 1–0 win over SD Ponferradina.

However, his time at Deportivo de La Coruña was overshadowed with alteration with teammate Luisinho and suspension. Despite this, his performance at the club attracted interests from UAE Pro-League side Al Wasl. Although he initially wanted to stay at the club, Culio ultimately changed his mind when he was absent from training in early–January.

=== Al Wasl ===
On 10 January 2014, Culio joined UAE Pro-League side Al Wasl for a transfer fee of 300,000 euros, until the end of the season.

On 14 January 2014, Culio made his Al Wasl debut in the quarter–finals of the UAE President Cup against Al Ain and scored during the match, but eventually, Al Wasl were eliminated following a 9–8 loss in the penalty shootout after the game went extra time. His league debut came on 18 January 2014, in a 2–1 loss against Al Jazira. For the rest of the 2013–14 season, he went on to make ten appearances for the side. Following this, it was announced that Culio left Al Wasl after being told by the club's management that he was surplus to requirements. After leaving the club, Culio reflected on his time at the club.

=== Las Palmas ===
On 25 August 2014, it was announced that Culio joined Las Palmas on a one–year contract with the club.

However, he missed the first two months at the club, due to delays of international clearance from Al Wasl. On 4 October 2014, he made his Las Palmas debut, where he started the whole game, in a 1–1 draw against Sporting de Gijón. Two weeks later, on 19 October 2014, Culio scored his first goal for the club, but was later sent–off for the second bookable offence, in a 2–0 win over CD Numancia. After serving a one match suspension, he returned to the starting lineup, where he set up a goal for Roque Mesa to score the second goal of the game, in a 2–1 win over Albacete on 1 November 2014. Since joining the club, Culio established himself in the starting eleven for the side. However, in a 5–3 win over Real Zaragoza on 11 January 2015, Culio was sent–off, along with his two teammates, for arguing with referee and officials, leading him to serve a two match suspension. Las Palmas came fourth and made the play-offs, in which, Culio was featured in four matches in the play-offs, as on 21 June 2015, in the final second leg against Real Zaragoza at the Estadio Gran Canaria, he set up the opening goal for Mesa, which the club later won 2–0 on the night, 3–3 on aggregate, thus sending Los Amarillos into La Liga via the same rule. Despite being sidelined during the 2014–15 season, Culio went on to make thirty–three appearances and scoring once in all competitions.

At the start of the 2015–16 season, Culio was a first team regular for the side. Then, on 13 September 2015, he set up the club's third goal of the game, in a 3–3 draw against Celta. His first team runs last until on 18 October 2015 against Getafe when he was sent–off "for knocking down an opponent with his feet in the form of an iron, with no option to play the ball, when the ball is in play", in which he served a one match suspension. Following his return, his playing time was soon reduced and found himself on the substitute bench.

=== Real Zaragoza ===
On 2 February 2016, it was announced that Real Zaragoza, keeping him until 2017. Upon joining the club, his unveil at the club received negative reception from Real Zaragoza's supporters, due to his comment made about the club during his time at Las Palmas. In response, Culio apologised for his comment.

Four days later, on 6 February 2016, Culio made his Real Zaragoza debut, where he started the whole game, in a 1–0 win over CD Leganés. After the match, he received a standing ovation from Real Zaragoza's supporters for his performance. Since joining the club, Culio received a handful of first team appearances. However, suspensions and injuries plagued his playing time at the club for the rest of the season. At the end of the 2015–16 season, Culio went on to make twelve appearances in all competitions. On 5 July 2016, it was announced that he left Real Zaragoza by mutual consent. Ahead of the match between RCD Mallorca and Real Zaragoza on 5 November 2016, he said family reasons was another factor of his departure from the club.

=== Mallorca ===
After leaving Real Zaragoza, it was announced that Culio joined Mallorca on the same day.

Culio made his RCD Mallorca debut, where he started the whole game, in a 1–0 loss against Reus Deportiu in the opening game of the season. Since joining the club, Culio established himself in the starting eleven for the side. Culio started in every match since the start of the season until he was suspended for picking up five yellow cards. Upon returning from suspension, he scored his first goal for the club on 5 November 2016, in a 2–2 draw against his former club, Real Zaragoza. However, he was, once again, sidelined when he suffered an injury that kept him out throughout January. After returning from an injury in early–February, Culio then scored his second goal for the side, in a 2–1 win over Rayo Vallecano. However, in a follow–up match against Girona on 18 February 2017, he was sent–off for a second bookable offence, in a 1–0 loss; and was suspended again for his fifth booking of the season. Culio then scored his third goal for the side, in a 2–2 draw against CD Mirandés on 4 June 2017. At the end of the 2016–17 season, he went on to make thirty–six appearances and scoring once in all competitions.

=== Return to CFR Cluj ===
On 26 June 2017, it was announced that Culio joined CFR Cluj for the second time in his career, signing a two–year contract. Upon joining the club, he expressed his happiness on returning to CFR Cluj.

Culio re–debuted for the club under coach Dan Petrescu on 17 July 2017, in the opening game of the season, a 1–1 draw against FC Botoșani. He then scored his first CFR Cluj goal since leaving the club, in a 3–0 win over Gaz Metan Mediaș on 29 July 2017. This was followed by scoring the next two goals in two matches against FC Politehnica Iași and Dinamo București. Since joining the club, he quickly established himself in the starting eleven for the side. By the end of 2017, he scored three more goals for the side. Later in the 2017–18 season, he scored two more goals for the side. He played a vital role for the club, along with Ovidiu Hoban, when they helped the side win the league for the first time in six years. Despite missing out some matches, due to suspension, during the 2017–18 season, Culio finished the 2017–18 season, making thirty–four appearances and scoring eight times in all competitions.

In the 2018–19 season, Culio started the season well when he scored the only goal of the game, scoring from a penalty, in a 1–0 win over Universitatea Craiova in the Supercupa României. However, in the second leg of the UEFA Champions League Second Qualifying Round against Malmö on 1 August 2018, he was sent–off in the 77th minute for a second bookable offence, in a 1–1 draw; eventually, eliminating CFR Cluj from the UEFA Champions League. Amid to the suspension, Culio scored his second goal of the season, scoring from a penalty, in a 2–1 win against Concordia Chiajna on 4 August 2018. After serving a one match suspension in the UEFA Europa League match, he scored on his return, in a 5–0 win against FC Alashkert to help the club advance to the next round. However, in a match against F91 Dudelange in the UEFA Europa League's play–off round, Culio suffered an injury in the 10th minute and was substituted, as CFR Cluj lost 2–0. After being sidelined for a month, he made his return from injury against Universitatea Craiova on 1 October 2018 and started the whole game, as the club drew 0–0. After being suspended for one match for picking up five yellow cards so far this season, Culio scored on his return, in a 5–1 win over Botoșani on 3 November 2018. However, in a match against CS Concordia Chiajna on 24 November 2018, he was sent–off for the third time this season so far for a second bookable offence, as CFR Cluj won 1–0. After serving a one match suspension, Culio scored on his return, in a 3–0 win over Dinamo București on 4 December 2018. Following this, he had a first team run ins between December and March, playing in the midfield positions. Having keen on staying with the club beyond next season, Culio signed a contract extension with CFR Cluj, keeping him until 2020. However, between those months, he was suspended on three occasions, including being sent–off twice on the pitch against FC Politehnica Iași and Sepsi OSK Sfântu Gheorghe on 23 February 2019 and 9 March 2019 respectively. After missing for the next three matches, Culio made his return to the starting line–up against FCSB on 14 April 2019, as the club drew 0–0. Two weeks later on 29 April 2019, he scored his sixth goal of the season, in a 3–1 win against Viitorul Constanța. Culio scored the goal that clinched the fifth league title in club history when he converted a penalty against Universitatea Craiova on 12 May 2019. At the end of the 2018–19 season, Culio went on to make thirty–two appearances and scoring seven times in all competitions.

At the start of the 2019–20 season, Culio started the season well when he helped CFR Cluj progress through the UEFA Champions League Qualifying round against FC Astana and Maccabi Tel Aviv (during the match, Culio earned a scoresheet). For his performance, he extended his contract with the club, keeping him until 2021. However, Culio suffered an injury during the second leg match against Maccabi Tel Aviv and was sidelined for almost two months. He made his return to the first team from injury, coming on as an 83rd-minute substitute, in a 2–1 win against Lazio on 19 September 2019. Two weeks later on 6 October 2019, Culio scored his first goal of the season, in a 3–1 loss against Viitorul Constanța. His second goal of the season came on 2 November 2019 against Academica Clinceni, as he helped CFR Cluj win 3–0. The next day, however, Culio announced his intention to leave the club at the end of the 2019–20 season despite signing a contract extension earlier this season. He scored his fourth goal of the season, in a 2–0 win against Astra Giurgiu on 16 December 2019 in his last home appearance at Stadionul Dr. Constantin Rădulescu. Culio played his last match at CFR Cluj against FC Voluntari on 21 December 2019 and scored his fifth goal of the season, in a 4–0 win. By the time he departed the club, Culio went on to make twenty appearances and scoring four times in all competitions.

CFR Cluj's shareholder Ștefan Gadola paid tribute to Culio, saying: "Culio was the fairest footballer I've ever seen. He's one of the coolest players I've ever played. A special boy, a family man, a perfect athlete.His decision surprised me, especially since I had actually talked to him last week. He was thoughtful, but he didn't tell me anything. He tells me, "My brother." Culio later stated that he would return to CFR Cluj should manager Dan Petrescu continued to manage the club. In the walk of his departure, CFR Cluj announced that they would be retiring his number nineteen shirt.

=== Quilmes ===
After leaving CFR Cluj, Culio joined Quilmes in Argentina, in order to be closer to his family. It came after when the club expressed interest in signing him shortly after leaving CFR Cluj.

He made his debut for Quilmes on 7 February 2020 against Tigre and started the whole game, as the club won 2–1. Culio then started in the next five matches, playing in the midfield position, making six appearances for Quilmes. However, the season was suspended and eventually cancelled because of the COVID-19 pandemic. He then signed a contract extension with the club.

Ahead of the 2020 season, Culio was tested positive for COVID-19 on two occasions and did not make a single appearances for the club as a result, as well as, taking care of his wife, who is suffering from cancer. After two months absent, he returned to training for Quilmes Atletico Club. In March 2021, Culio left Quilmes Atletico Club by mutual consent and announced his retirement from professional football to take care of his wife.

=== Flandria ===
Two months after announcing his retirement from professional football, Culio reversed his decision and signed for CSD Flandria on 4 May 2021.

== Personal life ==
Outside of football, Culio has a job at the construction, having worked there since he was thirteen, along with his father and brother. He said he worked in construction to earn a living and played football in his spare time.

Culio is married to his wife and together, they have two daughters and one son. He also expressed interests in obtaining a Romanian Citizenship despite struggling to speak the language at first. When he first joined CFR Cluj, Culio stated that he was treated as Romanian, along with his family. He further previously stated that he wanted to play for Romania instead of his native country on three separate statements. In December 2019, Culio decided to leave CFR Cluj for personal reasons and to return with his family to Argentina.

In addition to speaking Spanish, Culio was learning Russian in hopes of joining a Russian club, which never happened.

== Career statistics ==
Appearances and goals by club, season and competition
Club	Season	League			National cup (Note: Includes Cupa României, Turkish Cup, Copa del Rey)		Continental		Other		Total	
Club	Season	Division	Apps	Goals	Apps	Goals	Apps	Goals	Apps	Goals	Apps	Goals
Flandria	2002–03	Primera B Metropolitana	37	1	–		–		–		37	1
Flandria	2003–04	Primera B Metropolitana	7	0	–		–		–		7	0
Flandria	Total		44	1	–		–		–		44	1
Almagro	2004–05	Primera División	8	0	–		–		–		8	0
Independiente	2005–06	Primera División	1	0	–		–		–		1	0
Racing Club	2006–07	Primera División	3	0	–		–		–		3	0
Deportes La Serena	2007	Primera División	19	2	–		–		–		19	2
CFR Cluj	2007–08	Liga I	32	1	4	0	2 (Note: Appearances in UEFA Cup)	0	–		38	1
CFR Cluj	2008–09	Liga I	29	1	5	1	6 (Note: Appearances in UEFA Champions League)	2	–		40	4
CFR Cluj	2009–10	Liga I	28	1	5	0	8 (Note: Appearances in UEFA Europa League)	1	1 (Note: Appearance in Supercupa României)	0	42	2
CFR Cluj	2010–11	Liga I	18	2	1	0	6	1	1	0	26	3
CFR Cluj	Total		107	5	15	1	22	4	2	0	146	10
Galatasaray	2010–11	Süper Lig	15	4	4	0	–		–		19	4
Orduspor (loan)	2011–12	Süper Lig	30	4	1	0	–		–		31	4
Mersin İdmanyurdu (loan)	2012–13	Süper Lig	31	5	4	1	–		–		35	6
Deportivo La Coruña	2013–14	Segunda División	18	2	0	0	–		–		18	2
Al Wasl	2013–14	UAE Pro League	10	0	1	0	–		–		11	0
Las Palmas	2014–15	Segunda División	27	1	2	0	–		4 (Note: Appearance(s) in Segunda División promotion play-offs)	0	33	1
Las Palmas	2015–16	La Liga	12	0	6	0	–		–		18	0
Las Palmas	Total		39	1	8	0	–		4	0	51	1
Zaragoza	2015–16	Segunda División	12	0	0	0	–		–		12	0
Mallorca	2016–17	Segunda División	35	4	1	0	–		–		36	4
CFR Cluj	2017–18	Liga I	33	8	1	0	–		–		34	8
CFR Cluj	2018–19	Liga I	25	5	2	0	4 (Note: Two appearances in UEFA Champions League, two appearances and one goal in UEFA Europa League)	1	1	1	32	7
CFR Cluj	2019–20	Liga I	9	4	0	0	10 (Note: Four appearances and one goal in UEFA Champions League, six appearances in UEFA Europa League)	1	1	0	20	5
CFR Cluj	Total		67	17	3	0	14	2	2	1	86	20
Quilmes	2019–20	Primera Nacional	6	0	–		–		–		6	0
Quilmes	2020	Primera Nacional	1	0	–		–		–		1	0
Quilmes	Total		7	0	0	0	––		–		7	0
Flandria	2021	Primera B Metropolitana	6	0	0	0	–		–		6	0
CFR Cluj	2021–22	Liga I	8	1	0	0	4 (Note: Appearances in UEFA Conference League)	0	–		12	1
Career total			460	46	37	2	40	6	8	1	545	55

== Honours ==
CFR Cluj

- Liga I: 2007–08, 2009–10, 2017–18, 2018–19, 2019–20, 2021–22
- Cupa României: 2007–08, 2008–09, 2009–10
- Supercupa României: 2009, 2010, 2018

Individual

- Liga I Team of the Championship play-offs: 2017–18,
- Liga I Team of the Season: 2017–18
