= 2009–10 FC Oțelul Galați season =

Football season in Romania

FC Oțelul
2009–10 season
- Chairman: Marius Stan
- Manager: Dorinel Munteanu
- Liga I: 8th
- Cupa României: Round of 16
- Top goalscorer: League: Axente, Antal, Giurgiu, Paraschiv (5); All: Axente, Antal, Giurgiu, Paraschiv (5); Ibeh (3); Pena (3); Costin (2); Iorga (2); Ochiroşii (2)

== Match results ==
=== Friendlies ===
7 July 2009	Oțelul Galați	1–1	Astra	Buşteni
17:30	Antal 34'		Păun 36'	Stadium: Caraimanul

13 July 2009	Oțelul Galați (Romania)	2–2	(Poland) Górnik Łęczna	Szentgotthárd
19:00	Matei 31', 34', (yellow card) 35'; Costin (yellow card) 87'		Bartoszewicz 44' (pen.); Michalak 89'

16 July 2009	Oțelul Galați (Romania)	1–1	(Bulgaria) Slavia Sofia	Beltinci
19:00	Iorga 45'	(Report)	Mladenov 4'

20 July 2009	Oțelul Galați (Romania)	0–2	(Poland) Śląsk Wrocław	Križevci
19:00			Biliński 26'; Dudek 57' (pen.)

21 July 2009	Oțelul Galați (Romania)	0–1	(Bulgaria) Minyor Pernik	Maribor
19:00		(Report)	Gospodinov 49'

23 July 2009	Oțelul Galați	2–1	Astra	Križevci
12:15	Costin 42'; Paraschiv 80'		Chiacu 77'

2 September 2009	Oțelul Galați	1–2	Delta Tulcea	Galați
17:30	Paraschiv 12'		Pantelie 6', 26'	Stadium: Oțelul; Attendance: 1,000; Referee: Viorel Cojocaru

4 September 2009	Rapid București	2–0	Oțelul Galați	Bucharest
19:00	Ioniţă 72'; Pinto 89'	(Report)		Stadium: Pro Rapid; Attendance: 0 (closed doors)

9 October 2009	Unirea Urziceni	2–3	Oțelul Galați	Urziceni
17:00	Bilaşco 73' (pen.); Onofraş 90'		Pena 21' (pen.); Matei 41'; Iorga 65'	Stadium: Tineretului; Attendance: 150

14 November 2009	Ceahlăul	0–2	Oțelul Galați	Piatra Neamţ
15:00			Perendija 36'; Paternotte 58' (o.g.)	Stadium: Ceahlăul

1 February 2010	Oțelul Galați (Romania)	2–1	(Bulgaria) FC Chavdar	Antalya
16:00	Ochiroşii (red card) 23'; Viglianti 37'; Axente 43'		Boris Raichev 71'; (red card) 79'	Stadium: Asat

3 February 2010	Oțelul Galați (Romania)	1–0	(Switzerland) FC Winterthur	Antalya
15:00	Pena 39'			Stadium: Asat

5 February 2010	Oțelul Galați (Romania)	0–1	(Ukraine) FC Volyn Lutsk	Antalya
16:00			Yevhenniy Pavlov 44'	Stadium: Asat

7 February 2010	Oțelul Galați (Romania)	0–0	(Kazakhstan) FC Zhetysu	Antalya (Only 45 minutes were played)
19:00				Stadium: Kremlin

9 February 2010	Oțelul Galați (Romania)	2–1	(Poland) Jagiellonia Białystok	Antalya
17:00	Mariusz Gogol 36' (o.g.); Axente 69'		Jan Paweł Pawłowski 90'	Stadium: Asat

10 February 2010	Oțelul Galați (Romania)	1–1	(Austria) Trenkwalder Admira	Belek
16:00	Nikolić 50'		41'	Stadium: Calista

11 February 2010	Oțelul Galați (Romania)	3–1	(Bosnia and Herzegovina) FK Slavija	Antalya
15:00	Axente 29'; Cojoc 76'; Neagu 79'; Perendija (red card) 81'		Baković 13'; (red card) 81'	Stadium: Kremlin

=== Liga I ===
==== League table ====
Pos	Team	Pld	W	D	L	GF	GA	GD	Pts	Qualification or relegation
6	Dinamo București	34	13	14	7	48	37	+11	53	Qualification to Europa League second qualifying round (Note: Since 2009–10 Cupa României winners CFR Cluj and runners-up Vaslui qualified for European competitions via their league placement, the allocation of UEFA Europa League spots effectively reverted to league placement as well, with the 6th-placed team Dinamo București also qualifying.)
7	Rapid București	34	14	10	10	53	38	+15	52	
8	Oțelul Galați	34	14	8	12	38	38	0	50	
9	Brașov	34	12	10	12	40	30	+10	46	
10	Gaz Metan Mediaș	34	9	15	10	33	37	−4	42	

Source: LPF (in Romanian)
Rules for classification: 1) points; 2) head-to-head points; 3) head-to-head goal difference; 4) head-to-head goals scored; 5) goal difference; 6) number of goals scored.

==== Results by round ====
Round	1	2	3	4	5	6	7	8	9	10	11	12	13	14	15	16	17	18	19	20	21	22	23	24	25	26	27	28	29	30	31	32	33	34
Ground	A	H	A	H	H	A	H	A	H	A	H	A	H	A	H	A	H	H	A	H	A	A	H	A	H	A	H	A	H	A	H	A	H	A
Result	W	D	L	L	L	W	L	W	D	L	W	L	D	L	W	D	W	W	W	W	L	D	L	W	D	L	W	D	D	L	W	W	W	L
Position	4	5	12	12	16	13	15	12	13	15	12	12	11	14	10	10	9	9	9	9	9	8	8	8	8	8	8	8	8	8	8	8	7	8

Updated to match(es) played on 9 May. Source: Matches
A = Away; H = Home; W = Win; D = Draw; L = Loss

==== Results summary ====
Overall								Home						Away					
Pld	W	D	L	GF	GA	GD	Pts	W	D	L	GF	GA	GD	W	D	L	GF	GA	GD
34	14	8	12	38	38	0	50	8	5	4	23	16	+7	6	3	8	15	22	−7

==== Matches ====
31 July 2009 Matchday 1	Internaţional	0–1	Oțelul Galați	Mioveni
18:30	Chiricheș (yellow card) 55'; Băcilă (yellow card) 90+2'; Neagu (yellow card) 90+4'; Frăsineanu (red card) 90+5'		Giurgiu (yellow card) 36'; Axente 40'; Baotić (yellow card) 76'; Antal (yellow card) 78'; Mojsov (yellow card) 87'	Stadium: Dacia; Attendance: 4,000; Referee: Istvan Kovacs

9 August 2009 Matchday 2	Oțelul Galați	0–0	Ceahlăul	Galați
18:00	Giurgiu (yellow card) 43'; Mojsov (yellow card) 54'; Râpă (yellow card) 69'		Tudosă (yellow card) 63'	Stadium: Oțelul; Attendance: 0 (closed doors); Referee: Marius Avram

15 August 2009 Matchday 3	CFR Cluj	1–0	Oțelul Galați	Cluj-Napoca
19:15	Panin (yellow card) 32'; Tony (yellow card) 60'; Traoré 70'; Dani (yellow card) 90+2'		Zhelev (yellow card) 30'; Siminic (yellow card) 36'; Perendija (yellow card) 64'; Paraschiv (yellow card) 90+1'	Stadium: Dr. Constantin Rădulescu; Attendance: 8,000; Referee: Cătălin Buşi

23 August 2009 Matchday 4	Oțelul Galați	0–1	Steaua București	Galați
17:00			Székely (yellow card) 29'; Surdu 58'; Stancu (yellow card) 62' (yellow-red card) 75'; Onicaş (yellow card) 90'	Stadium: Oțelul; Attendance: 6,000; Referee: Istvan Kovacs

28 August 2009 Matchday 5	Oțelul Galați	1–4	Unirea Urziceni	Galați
17:30	Iorga (red card) 7'; Antal (yellow card) 36'; Paraschiv 37'; Costin (yellow card) 43' (yellow-red card) 73'		Bilaşco 8' (pen.), 88'; Maftei 44'; Pădureţu (yellow card) 75'; Onofraş 85'	Stadium: Oțelul; Attendance: 3,500; Referee: Alexandru Tudor

12 September 2009 Matchday 6	Dinamo București	0–1	Oțelul Galați	Bucharest
19:00	Moţi (yellow card) 31'		Zhelev (yellow card) 29'; Axente 36'; Neagu (yellow card) 56'; Goločevac (yellow card) 68'; Cârjă (yellow card) 90+4'	Stadium: Dinamo; Attendance: 3,000; Referee: Mugurel Drăgănescu

19 September 2009 Matchday 7	Oțelul Galați	0–1	Gaz Metan Mediaş	Galați
17:00	Paraschiv (yellow card) 69'; Sârghi (yellow card) 75'; Ilie (yellow card) 89'		Kubala (yellow card) 62'; Nohai (yellow card) 76'; Bud 83'; Buchta (yellow card) 90+2'	Stadium: Oțelul; Attendance: 4,000; Referee: Victor Berbecaru

27 September 2009 Matchday 8	Pandurii Târgu Jiu	2–3	Oțelul Galați	Târgu Jiu
16:00	Păcurar 1', 22'; Popete (yellow card) 12'; Grecu (yellow card) 42' (yellow-red card) 86'; Mingote (yellow card) 71'		Antal 11', (yellow card) 76'; Siminic (yellow card) 20'; Râpă (yellow card) 41'; Kolev (yellow card) 43'; Neagu (yellow card) 57'; Paraschiv 68', 79'	Stadium: Tudor Vladimirescu; Attendance: 4,000; Referee: Radu Petrescu

2 October 2009 Matchday 9	Oțelul Galați	1–1	FC Brașov	Galați
16:00	Giurgiu 49'; Axente (yellow card) 52'; Ilie (yellow card) 53'; Sălăgeanu (yellow card) 54'; Zhelev (yellow card) 58'; Râpă (yellow card) 61'		Voicu 35', (yellow card) 84'; Rui Duarte (yellow card) 54'; Măldărăşanu (yellow card) 69'	Stadium: Oțelul; Attendance: 3,000; Referee: Alexandru Deaconu

18 October 2009 Matchday 10	Gloria Bistriţa	2–1	Oțelul Galați	Bistriţa
14:00	Borbély 48', 70'; Keita (yellow card) 63'; Băjenaru (yellow card) 74'; Ciucă (yellow card) 83'		Antal 24', (yellow card) 34'; Viglianti (yellow card) 38' (yellow-red card) 60'; Giurgiu (yellow card) 53'; Sălăgeanu (yellow card) 90'	Stadium: Gloria; Attendance: 3,000; Referee: Ovidiu Haţegan

23 October 2009 Matchday 11	Oțelul Galați	4–0	Politehnica Iaşi	Galați
15:00	Kolev (yellow card) 10'; Sălăgeanu (yellow card) 24'; Giurgiu 38', 75'; Ibeh 50'; Marius Pena 72' (pen.)		Pečnik (red card) 51'	Stadium: Oțelul; Attendance: 2,000; Referee: Teodor Crăciunescu

1 November 2009 Matchday 12	Rapid București	3–0	Oțelul Galați	București
18:00	Ioniţă 39'; Grigorie 68'; Herea 80' (pen.)		Kolev (yellow card) 80' (yellow-red card) 90'; Mojsov (yellow card) 90+1'	Stadium: Giuleşti-Valentin Stănescu; Attendance: 5,000; Referee: Istvan Kovacs

8 November 2009 Matchday 13	Oțelul Galați	3–3	FC Timișoara	Galați
14:00	Axente 24', 43'; Ibeh 53'; Neagu (yellow card) 61'		Chiacu 49'; Vršič (yellow card) 59'; Magera 82'; Luchin 89'	Stadium: Oțelul; Attendance: 4,000; Referee: Radu Petrescu

20 November 2009 Matchday 14	Unirea Alba Iulia	3–1	Oțelul Galați	Alba Iulia
14:00	Varga (yellow card) 17'; Dan 59'; Olah 61'; Cernea (yellow card) 74'; Grozav 82'		Neagu (yellow card) 31'; Axente (yellow card) 35'; Sârghi (yellow card) 41'; Ibeh (yellow card) 70'; Paraschiv 90+1'	Stadium: Victoria-Cetate; Attendance: 3,000; Referee: Robert Dumitru

1 December 2009 Matchday 15	Oțelul Galați	3–2	Astra Ploieşti	Galați
14:00	Viglianti (yellow card) 12'; Ibeh 19'; Giurgiu (yellow card) 58'; Iorga (yellow card) 67', (goal) 90'; Râpă (yellow card) 75'; Pena 79'		Ganea (yellow card) 29', (goal) 75'; Crăciun (yellow card) 56'; Miranda (yellow card) 62'; Takayuki 83'; Opršal (yellow card) 90+3'	Stadium: Oțelul; Attendance: 3,000; Referee: Augustus Constantin

6 December 2009 Matchday 16	FC Vaslui	1–1	Oțelul Galați	Vaslui
16:00	Genchev (yellow card) 33'; Burdujan 38'; Akakpo (yellow card) 80'; Hugo Luz (yellow card) 85'		Sârghi 4', (yellow card) 55'; Pena (yellow card) 32'; Paraschiv (yellow card) 42'; Baotić (yellow card) 90+4'	Stadium: Municipal; Attendance: 7,000; Referee: Mugurel Drăgănescu

12 December 2009 Matchday 17	Oțelul Galați	1–0	Universitatea Craiova	Galați
14:00	Paraschiv (yellow card) 26'; Pena (yellow card) 30'; Ilie 41', (yellow card) 42'		Şoavă (yellow card) 33'; Firţulescu (yellow card) 45'; Barbu (yellow card) 77'; Bădoi (yellow card) 85'	Stadium: Oțelul; Attendance: 2,500; Referee: Cristian Balaj

19 February 2010 Matchday 18	Oțelul Galați	1–0	Internaţional	Galați
14:00	Sălăgeanu (yellow card) 25'; Sârghi (yellow card) 53' (yellow-red card) 88'; Ochiroşii 83'		Lazăr (yellow card) 50'	Stadium: Oțelul; Attendance: 6,000; Referee: Mugurel Drăgănescu

26 February 2010 Matchday 19	Ceahlăul	0–1	Oțelul Galați	Piatra Neamţ
17:00	Villadsen (yellow card) 50'		Giurgiu 22'; Perendija (yellow card) 41'	Stadium: Ceahlăul; Attendance: 2,000; Referee: Paul Unimatan

7 March 2010 Matchday 20	Oțelul Galați	1–0	CFR Cluj	Galați
15:00	Neagu 38'; Râpă (yellow card) 89'		Mureşan (yellow card) 71' (yellow-red card) 84'; Cadú (yellow card) 89'	Stadium: Oțelul; Attendance: 9,000; Referee: Sebastian Colţescu

12 March 2010 Matchday 21	Steaua București	1–0	Oțelul Galați	București
20:30	Stancu 10'; Parpas (yellow card) 39'; Kapetanos (yellow card) 69'; Zhivko Zhelev (yellow card) 75'		Antal (yellow card) 72'	Stadium: Steaua; Attendance: 4,000; Referee: Victor Berbecaru

18 March 2010 Matchday 22	Unirea Urziceni	0–0	Oțelul Galați	Urziceni
18:30	Galamaz (yellow card) 40'; Bruno Fernandes (yellow card) 73'; Rusescu (yellow card) 85'		Pena (yellow card) 59'; Grahovac (yellow card) 87'	Stadium: Tineretului; Attendance: 3,000; Referee: Radu Petrescu

21 March 2010 Matchday 23	Oțelul Galați	2–3	Dinamo București	Galați
15:30	Râpă (yellow card) 11'; Axente (yellow card) 35'; Paraschiv 50'; Antal 61' (pen.); Sârghi (yellow card) 80'; Ochiroşii (yellow card) 89'		Moţi 5', (yellow card) 60'; Alexe 20'; Scarlatache (yellow card) 37'; An. Cristea 55' (pen.), (yellow card) 71' (yellow-red card) 81'; Rus (yellow card) 59'	Stadium: Oțelul; Attendance: 13,000; Referee: Cristian Balaj

26 March 2010 Matchday 24	Gaz Metan	0–1	Oțelul Galați	Mediaş
18:30	Kubala (yellow card) 35'; Khubutia (yellow card) 52'; Zaharia (yellow card) 62'; Buzean (yellow card) 71'; Liţu (yellow card) 79'	(Report)	Costin 36', (yellow card) 54'; Antal (yellow card) 52'; Ilie (yellow card) 76'; Grahovac (yellow card) 90+2'; Pena (yellow card) 90+3'	Stadium: Municipal Gaz Metan; Attendance: 4,000; Referee: Alexandru Tudor

2 April 2010 Matchday 25	Oțelul Galați	1–1	Pandurii Târgu Jiu	Galați
14:00	Axente (red card) 23'; Iorga 30'; Sârghi (yellow card) 88'		Vranješ 45+1'; Cardoso (yellow card) 52'	Stadium: Oțelul; Attendance: 4,000; Referee: Marcu Florin Mihai

6 April 2010 Matchday 26	FC Brașov	3–0	Oțelul Galați	Braşov
20:00	Abrudan 2'; Sburlea 19'; Roman (yellow card) 26', (goal) 80'; Rui Duarte (yellow card) 38'; Ilyeş (yellow card) 77'		Perendija (yellow card) 13' (yellow-red card) 63'; Ilie (yellow card) 17'; Costin (yellow card) 59'; Cojoc (yellow card) 79'; Ochiroşii (yellow card) 84'	Stadium: Tineretului; Attendance: 500; Referee: Ovidiu Haţegan

10 April 2010 Matchday 27	Oțelul Galați	3–0	Gloria Bistriţa	Galați
15:00	Antal 4' (pen.), (yellow card) 60'; Sălăgeanu (yellow card) 30'; Giurgiu (yellow card) 51'; Neagu (yellow card) 58'; Viglianti 72'; Pena 85'	(Report)	Velcovici (yellow card) 4'; Frăsinescu (yellow card) 51'; Keita (yellow card) 73'; Ciucă (yellow card) 84'	Stadium: Oțelul; Attendance: 4,000; Referee: Paul Unimatan

18 April 2010 Matchday 28	Politehnica Iaşi	1–1	Oțelul Galați	Iaşi
16:00	Badea 52' (pen.)		Ochiroşii 30'; Râpă (yellow card) 82'	Stadium: Emil Alexandrescu; Attendance: 5,000; Referee: Teodor Crăciunescu

24 April 2010 Matchday 29	Oțelul Galați	0–0	Rapid București	Galați
17:00	Ochiroşii (yellow card) 17'; Viglianti (yellow card) 53'; Cojoc (red card) 55'; Antal (yellow card) 58'		Lazăr (yellow card) 30'; Matič (yellow card) 52'; Spadacio (yellow card) 84'; Constantin (yellow card) 89'	Stadium: Oțelul; Attendance: 8,000; Referee: István Kovács

1 May 2010 Matchday 30	FC Timișoara	2–1	Oțelul Galați	Timișoara
19:00	Magera 7', (yellow card) 62'; Cociş 13'		Viglianti (yellow card) 14'; Axente 53'	Stadium: Dan Păltinişanu; Attendance: 6,000; Referee: Marius Avram

6 May 2010 Matchday 31	Oțelul Galați	1–0	Unirea Alba Iulia	Galați
14:30	Râpă (yellow card) 29'; Sălăgeanu 37'; Costin (yellow card) 39'; Neagu (yellow card) 78'; Ilie (yellow card) 82'			Stadium: Oțelul; Attendance: 2,000; Referee: Georgian Ionescu

9 May 2010 Matchday 32	Astra Ploieşti	0–3	Oțelul Galați	Ploieşti
18:00	Strătilă (yellow card) 34'; Opršal (yellow card) 90+1'		Sârghi (yellow card) 27'; Giurgiu 45'; Costin 59'; Cojoc (yellow card) 80'; Antal 86'	Stadium: Astra; Attendance: 5,000; Referee: Sebastian Colţescu

17 May 2010 Matchday 33	Oțelul Galați	1–0	FC Vaslui	Galați
17:00	Papp 50' (o.g.); Ochiroşii (yellow card) 77'; Neagu (yellow card) 81'; Ilie (yellow card) 82'; Costin (yellow card) 88'; Grahovac (yellow card) 90+2'		Zubar (yellow card) 49'; Milisavljević (yellow card) 83'; Hugo Luz (yellow card) 90+1'	Stadium: Oțelul; Attendance: 5,000; Referee: Alexandru Tudor

22 May 2010 Matchday 34	Universitatea Craiova	3–0	Oțelul Galați	Drobeta-Turnu Severin
16:30	Iliev 14'; Dilevski (yellow card) 24'; Prepeliţă 50'; Bărboianu (yellow card) 58', (goal) 90+2'		Pena (yellow card) 72'	Stadium: Municipal; Attendance: 7,000; Referee: Cristian Balaj

=== Cupa României ===
23 September 2009 Round of 32	Oțelul Galați	1–1 (a.e.t.) (4–3 p)	Unirea Alba Iulia	Galați
16:00	Perendija (yellow card) 20' (yellow-red card) 118'; Ibeh 22'; Mojsov (yellow card) 26'; Paraschiv (yellow card) 30'; Neagu (yellow card) 47'; Sălăgeanu (yellow card) 60'; Viglianti (yellow card) 90'; Pena (yellow card) 115'		Olah 20', (yellow card) 24'; Varga (yellow card) 37'; Bonacin (yellow card) 87'; Costea (yellow card) 96'; Rotaru (yellow card) 116'	Stadium: Oțelul; Attendance: 2,000; Referee: Sebastian Colţescu
	Penalties
	Pena (penalty scored); Viglianti (penalty scored); Ibeh (penalty scored); Sălăgeanu (penalty scored)		(penalty missed) Dan; (penalty scored) Dâlbea; (penalty scored) Olah; (penalty scored) Grozav; (penalty missed) Verdeş

29 October 2009 Round of 16	Dinamo București	1–0	Oțelul Galați	Bucharest
20:30	Tamaş (yellow card) 62'; Niculescu 75'		Sârghi (yellow card) 79'	Stadium: Dinamo; Referee: Mugurel Drăgănescu

== Players ==
=== Squad statistics ===
				Total			Liga I		Cupa României	
No.	Pos.	Nat.	Name	Sts	App	Gls	App	Gls	App	Gls
8	MF	(Romania)	Antal	19	26	5	25	5	1	
9	FW	(Romania)	Axente	17	27	5	25	5	2	
1	GK	(Bosnia and Herzegovina)	Baotić	7	7		7			
2	DF	(Romania)	Cârjă	1	2		2			
20	DF	(Romania)	Cojoc	1	10		10			
18	DF	(Romania)	Costin	30	31	2	29	2	2	
29	MF	(Romania)	Giurgiu	33	33	5	32	5	1	
5	MF	(Serbia)	Goločevac	3	3		3			
12	GK	(Bosnia and Herzegovina)	Grahovac	16	16		16			
15	MF	(Nigeria)	Ibeh	14	25	4	23	3	2	1
14	DF	(Romania)	Ilie	16	22	1	21	1	1	
7	MF	(Romania)	Iorga	15	23	2	22	2	1	
12	GK	(Bulgaria)	Kolev	13	13		11		2	
11	FW	(Romania)	Matei	4	6		6			
10	MF	(Romania)	Mojsov	4	8		7		1	
19	FW	(Cameroon)	N'Kongue	1	3		3			
26	MF	(Romania)	Neagu	26	27	1	25	1	2	
11	MF	(Romania)	Ochiroşii	14	16	2	16	2		
30	MF	(Romania)	Paraschiv	24	33	5	31	5	2	
6	MF	(Romania)	Pătraş	7	10		9		1	
27	FW	(Romania)	Pena	15	25	3	23	3	2	
21	DF	(Serbia)	Perendija	9	13		12		1	
3	DF	(Romania)	Râpă	34	34		32		2	
23	DF	(Romania)	Sălăgeanu	25	28	1	26	1	2	
16	DF	(Romania)	Sârghi	22	24	1	23	1	1	
4	DF	(Romania)	Siminic	5	6		6			
31	CB	(Bosnia and Herzegovina)	Šipović	1	1		1			
37	MF	(Argentina)	Viglianti	10	18	1	16	1	2	
31	DF	(Bulgaria)	Zhelev	10	11		11			

Last updated: 22 May 2010
Source: official website and Viaţa Liberă
Ordered by player name
0 shown as blank

== Transfers ==
=== In ===
No.	Pos.	Nat.	Name	Age	EU	Moving from	Type	Transfer window	Ends	Transfer fee	Source
11	SS	(Romania)	Matei	25	EU	Botoşani	Transfer	Summer	2012	€50,000	
5	AM	(Serbia)	Goločevac	25	Non-EU	Sevojno (Serbia)	Transfer	Summer	2012	€40,000	
8	RM	(Romania)	Antal	20	EU	FCM Târgu Mureş (Romania)	Transfer	Summer	2014	Free	
1	GK	(Bosnia and Herzegovina)	Baotić	24	Non-EU	SK Sturm Graz (Austria)	Transfer	Summer	2013	Free	
21	CB	(Serbia)	Perendija	23	Non-EU	Rabotnički (North Macedonia)	Transfer	Summer	2013	€100,000	
10	CM	(North Macedonia)	Mojsov	24	Non-EU	Rabotnički (North Macedonia)	Transfer	Summer	2010	€100,000	
17	CB	(Romania)	David	25	EU	Bacău	Transfer	Summer	TBA	Undisclosed	
19	ST	(Cameroon)	N'Kongue	26	Non-EU	Delta Tulcea	Transfer	Summer	TBA	Undisclosed	
6	MF	(Moldova)	Pătraş	20	Non-EU	Politehnica Timișoara	Loan	Summer	2010	–	
9	FW	(Romania)	Axente	22	EU	Politehnica Timișoara	Loan	Summer	2010	–	
	ST	(Romania)	Neagoie	24	EU	Timișoara	Transfer	Summer	2014	Free	
4	LB	(Romania)	Siminic	23	EU	Politehnica Timișoara	Transfer	Summer	TBA	Undisclosed	
–	GK	(Colombia)	William Arias	19	Non-EU	Deportes Tolima (Colombia)	Transfer	Summer	2010	Free	
11	MF	(Romania)	Ochiroşii	20	EU	Steaua București	Transfer	Winter	TBA	Swap	
12	GK	(Bosnia and Herzegovina)	Grahovac	26	Non-EU	Borac Čačak (Serbia)	Transfer	Winter	2015	€50,000	
–	FW	(Romania)	Buş	22	EU	Arieşul Turda	Transfer	Winter	TBA	Undisclosed	
–	CB	(Romania)	Hristian	21	EU	Politehnica Galaţi	Transfer	Winter	2015	Free	

=== Out ===
No.	Pos.	Nat.	Name	Age	EU	Moving to	Type	Transfer window	Transfer fee	Source
–	GK	(Lithuania)	Grybauskas	25	EU		Contract expired	Summer	–	
–	MF	(Romania)	Gado	27	EU		Contract expired	Summer	–	
–	MF	(Romania)	Ioviţă	25	EU		Released	Summer	–	
–	MF	(Croatia)	Vitaić	27	Non-EU		Released	Summer	–	
–	MF	(Romania)	Bourceanu	24	EU	Politehnica Timișoara	Transfer	Summer	€700,000	
–	FW	(Lithuania)	Labukas	25	EU	Arka Gdynia (Poland)	Transfer	Summer	Undisclosed	
–	FW	(Romania)	Elek	21	EU	Petrolul Ploiești	Loan	Summer	Undisclosed	
–	MF	(Romania)	Tişmănaru	22	EU	Bacău	Loan	Summer	Undisclosed	
–	DF	(Romania)	Cucu		EU	CSM Râmnicu Sărat	Loan	Summer	Undisclosed	
–	MF	(Romania)	Miron		EU	CSM Râmnicu Sărat	Loan	Summer	Undisclosed	
–	FW	(Romania)	Dragoş	20	EU	CSM Râmnicu Sărat	Loan	Summer	Undisclosed	
–	DF	(Romania)	Schwartz	19	EU	CSM Râmnicu Sărat	Loan	Summer	Undisclosed	
–	FW	(Romania)	Cârjan		EU	Dunărea Galați	Loan	Summer	Undisclosed	
–	DF	(Romania)	Agache		EU	Dunărea Galați	Loan	Summer	Undisclosed	
–	MF	(Romania)	Avram	18	EU	Petrolul Ploiești	Loan	Summer	Undisclosed	
–	MF	(Romania)	Neagoie	24	EU	Petrolul Ploiești	Loan	Summer	Undisclosed	
31	CB	(Bulgaria)	Zhelev	30	EU	Steaua București	Transfer	Winter	swap	
12	GK	(Bulgaria)	Kolev	33	EU		Released	Winter	–	
10	CM	(North Macedonia)	Mojsov	24	Non-EU		Contract expired	Winter	–	
6	MF	(Moldova)	Pătraş	21	Non-EU	Politehnica Timișoara	Loan end	Winter	–	
17	CB	(Romania)	David	26	EU		Released	Winter	–	
	CM	(Romania)	Stancu	31	EU		Released	Winter	–	
	FW	(Romania)	Buş	22	EU	Arieşul Turda	Loan	Winter	–	
	FW	(Romania)	Matei	26	EU	FC Botoșani	Loan	Winter	–	
	FW	(Cameroon)	N'Kongue	26	Non-EU	FCM Târgu Mureș	Loan	Winter	–	
	FW	(Romania)	Tănasă	24	EU	FC Baia Mare	Released	Winter	–	
–	FW	(Romania)	Elek	21	EU	Bihor Oradea	Loan	Winter	Undisclosed	

Last updated: 29 May 2010

== Club ==
=== Coaching staff ===
Position	Staff
Head coach	(Romania) Dorinel Munteanu
Assistant coach 1	(Romania) Ion Balaur
Assistant coach 2	(Romania) Catălin Ciorman
Fitness coach	(Romania) Ionel Tămăşanu
Goalkeepers coach	(Romania) Tudorel Călugăru

Source: otelul-galati.ro

=== Kit ===
Supplier: Hummel
Sponsor(s): Liberty Galați

Home	Away

Source: "In curand, magazinul oficial!". Otelul-Galati.ro.
