= 2008–09 FC Oțelul Galați season =

FC Oțelul
2008–09 season
- Chairman: Marius Stan
- Manager: Petre Grigoraş
- Liga I: 12th
- Cupa României: Round of 16
- Top goalscorer: League: Paraschiv (9); All: Paraschiv (9); Pena (6); Viglianti (5); Iorga (3); Tănasă (3); Ibeh (2); Jelev (2)

== Match results ==
=== Friendlies ===
22 June 2008	FC Ena Făgăraş	1–4	Oțelul Galați	Făgăraş
11:00	?		Gabriel Zamfir; Paraschiv,,

25 June 2008	Oțelul Galați	3–0	Gloria Buzău	Braşov
18:00	Paraschiv 11'; Viglianti 77'; Pena 84'			Stadium: Carpaţi

5 July 2008 Austria	Oțelul Galați (Romania)	0–0	(Slovakia) MŠK Žilina	Klagenfurt
19:00

8 July 2008 Austria	Oțelul Galați (Romania)	0–2	(Hungary) MTK Hungária FC	Velden
19:00			Ádám 80'; Gábornak 83'

13 July 2008 Austria	Oțelul Galați (Romania)	5–0	(Austria) SV Spittal an der Drau	Velden
19:00	Anca 13'; Paraschiv 18', 39' (pen.); Pena 67'; Popovic 73'

20 July 2008	Oțelul Galați	6–1	CF Brăila	Galați
10:30	Paraschiv 11', 31'; Viglianti 49' (pen.); Nikolić 51'; Pena 77'; Iorga 82'		Neta 61'	Stadium: Oțelul; Referee: Marius Bocăneala

28 January 2009	Oțelul Galați	0–0	FCM Bacău	Moinești
15:00				Stadium: Petrolul

5 February 2009 Turkey	Oțelul Galați (Romania)	3–1	(North Macedonia) FK Metalurg Skopje	Antalya
16:00	? 32' (o.g.); Paraschiv 50'; Avram 80'		? 73'

7 February 2009 Turkey	Oțelul Galați (Romania)	1–0	(Kazakhstan) FC Lokomotiv Astana	Antalya
17:00	Pena 76'

9 February 2009 Turkey	Oțelul Galați (Romania)	1–1	(Ukraine) Illichivets	Antalya
17:00	Avram 76'		Byahanski 90'

11 February 2009 Turkey	Oțelul Galați (Romania)	1–0	(North Macedonia) FK Rabotnički	Antalya
11:00	Paraschiv 65'

13 February 2009 Turkey	Oțelul Galați (Romania)	0–0	(Belarus) FC Gomel	Antalya
14:00

15 February 2009 Turkey	Oțelul Galați (Romania)	0–2	(Ukraine) SC Tavriya Simferopol	Antalya
15:30			? 76', 90'

21 February 2009	Oțelul Galați	0–0	Rapid București	Galați
14:00	Bourceanu (yellow card) 42'; Costin (yellow card) 58'; Zhelev (yellow card) 84'			Stadium: Oțelul; Referee: Bogdan Anghelinei

18 March 2009	Unirea Slobozia	1–2	Oțelul Galați	Slobozia
15:30	? 30'		Viglianti 24'; Ibeh 90'	Stadium: 1 Mai

=== Liga I ===
==== League table ====
Pos	Team	Pld	W	D	L	GF	GA	GD	Pts	Qualification or relegation
10	Argeș Pitești (R)	34	12	8	14	41	47	−6	44	Relegation to Liga II (Note: Argeș Pitești were relegated to the Liga II due to allegations of referee bribery. Gaz Metan as best-placed relegated team were therefore spared from relegation.)
11	Pandurii Târgu Jiu	34	11	10	13	27	36	−9	43	
12	Oțelul Galați	34	11	7	16	37	48	−11	40	
13	Gloria Bistrița	34	11	5	18	32	44	−12	38	
14	Politehnica Iași	34	10	7	17	32	47	−15	37	

Source: LPF (in Romanian)
Rules for classification: 1) points; 2) head-to-head points; 3) head-to-head goal difference; 4) head-to-head goals scored; 5) goal difference; 6) number of goals scored.
(R) Relegated

==== Results by round ====
Round	1	2	3	4	5	6	7	8	9	10	11	12	13	14	15	16	17	18	19	20	21	22	23	24	25	26	27	28	29	30	31	32	33	34
Ground	A	H	A	H	A	H	A	H	A	H	H	A	H	A	H	A	H	H	A	H	A	H	A	H	A	H	A	A	H	A	H	A	H	A
Result	D	W	W	W	L	L	L	W	D	D	W	L	D	L	W	L	D	W	W	L	L	L	L	W	L	W	D	L	L	L	L	D	W	L
Position	7	4	3	1	5	6	9	9	8	8	6	9	9	11	10	11	10	9	8	10	11	11	11	11	11	11	11	12	12	12	12	12	11	12

Source: Matches
A = Away; H = Home; W = Win; D = Draw; L = Loss

==== Results summary ====
Overall								Home						Away					
Pld	W	D	L	GF	GA	GD	Pts	W	D	L	GF	GA	GD	W	D	L	GF	GA	GD
34	11	7	16	37	48	−11	40	9	3	5	24	17	+7	2	4	11	13	31	−18

==== Matches ====
27 July 2008 Matchday 1	Gaz Metan	2–2	Oțelul Galați	Mediaş
18:00	Boaru 7'; Zhelev 33' (o.g.); Marković (yellow card) 63'; Eric (yellow card) 72' (yellow-red card) 89'		Paraschiv 17', (yellow card) 38', (goal) 81'; Costin (yellow card) 61'; Cojoc (yellow card) 88'	Stadium: Municipal; Attendance: 4,000; Referee: Istvan Kovacs

2 August 2008 Matchday 2	Oțelul Galați	3–1	Otopeni	Galați
18:00	Paraschiv 15', 21'; Cojoc (yellow card) 62'; Gabriel Viglianti 73' (pen.); Nikolić (yellow card) 88'		Chiacu 64' (pen.); Negru (yellow card) 64' (yellow-red card) 90+2'	Stadium: Oțelul; Attendance: 0 (closed doors); Referee: Cristian Balaj

9 August 2008 Matchday 3	Gloria Buzău	0–2	Oțelul Galați	Buzău
19:00	Ninu (yellow card) 52'; Dias (yellow card) 87'		Paraschiv 7', 45'	Stadium: Municipal; Attendance: 6,000; Referee: Ionică Serea

17 August 2008 Matchday 4	Oțelul Galați	2–1	Rapid București	Galați
17:45	Iorga (yellow card) 28', (goal) 70'; Paraschiv 50'; Vitaić (yellow card) 83'		Đalović 78'	Stadium: Oțelul; Attendance: 0 (closed doors); Referee: Sebastian Colţescu

23 August 2008 Matchday 5	Universitatea Craiova	1–0	Oțelul Galați	Craiova
18:00	Găman 61'; Bărboianu (yellow card) 81'		Sălăgeanu (yellow card) 54'; Viglianti (yellow card) 72'	Stadium: Extensiv; Attendance: 9,000; Referee: Tiberiu Lajos

31 August 2008 Matchday 6	Oțelul Galați	0–1	SC Vaslui	Galați
17:45	Cojoc (yellow card) 17'; Sălăgeanu (yellow card) 33'; Iorga (yellow card) 90+3'		Ljubinković (yellow card) 33'; Temwanjera 68'; Jovanović (yellow card) 79'; Cânu (yellow card) 89'	Stadium: Oțelul; Attendance: 9,000; Referee: Alexandru Tudor

14 September 2008 Matchday 7	Politehnica Iaşi	2–1	Oțelul Galați	Iaşi
19:00	Bratu 44' (pen.); Bâlbă 70', (yellow card) 81'; Gavatorta (yellow card) 89'; Pleşca (yellow card) 90+1'		Nogo (red card) 44'; Ilie 84'	Stadium: Emil Alexandrescu; Attendance: 3,500; Referee: Aurelian Bogaciu

20 September 2008 Matchday 8	Oțelul Galați	1–0	Gloria Bistriţa	Galați
17:00	Sălăgeanu (yellow card) 48'; Pena 57'; Zhelev (yellow card) 87'		Vagner (yellow card) 53'; Petre (yellow card) 73'; Ninu (yellow card) 79'	Stadium: Oțelul; Attendance: 5,000; Referee: Marius Avram

27 September 2008 Matchday 9	Farul Constanţa	1–1	Oțelul Galați	Constanţa
21:00	Chico 11'; Farmache (yellow card) 39'; Fatai (yellow card) 40'; Şchiopu (yellow card) 51'; Pârvu (yellow card) 81'		Vitaić 70'; Bourceanu (red card) 77'; Viglianti (yellow card) 83'; Tişmănaru (yellow card) 89'	Stadium: Farul; Attendance: 300; Referee: Sorin Corpodean

5 October 2008 Matchday 10	Oțelul Galați	1–1	CFR Cluj	Galați
15:00	Panin 21' (o.g.)		Mureşan 19'; Tony (yellow card) 34'; Galiassi (yellow card) 40'	Stadium: Oțelul; Attendance: 5,000; Referee: Tiberiu Jalos

17 October 2008 Matchday 11	Oțelul Galați	2–0	Steaua București	Galați
15:00	Pena 24'; Tănasă (yellow card) 67', (goal) 83'; Kolev (yellow card) 79'		Semedo (yellow card) 90+1'	Stadium: Oțelul; Attendance: 8,000; Referee: Cristian Balaj

25 October 2008 Matchday 12	Dinamo București	1–0	Oțelul Galați	Bucharest
20:45	Torje 60'; Blay (yellow card) 81'			Stadium: Dinamo; Attendance: 500; Referee: Marius Martiş

2 November 2008 Matchday 13	Oțelul Galați	2–2	Timișoara	Galați
14:00	Brezinský 17' (o.g.); Viglianti 25'; Bourceanu (yellow card) 53'; Cârjă (yellow card) 80'		Art. Karamyan 5'; Bucur 90+3'	Stadium: Oțelul; Attendance: 7,000; Referee: Augustus Constantin

7 November 2008 Matchday 14	Unirea Urziceni	3–1	Oțelul Galați	Urziceni
20:30	Pădureţu 53'; Bălan 55'; Galamaz (yellow card) 59'; Ricardo (yellow card) 72'; Dănălache 83'; Apostol (yellow card) 89' (yellow-red card) 90+4'		Pena 52'; Bourceanu (yellow card) 81'; Cojocf (yellow card) 90+1'	Stadium: Tineretului; Attendance: 700; Referee: Robert Dumitru

16 November 2008 Matchday 15	Oțelul Galați	2–1	Braşov	Galați
14:00	Viglianti 31', 75'; Cojoc (yellow card) 55'; Ilie (yellow card) 59'; Sălăgeanu (yellow card) 90+2'		Dedu 21'; Cristescu (yellow card) 53'; Abrudan (yellow card) 90+2'	Stadium: Oțelul; Attendance: 4,000; Referee: Alexandru Deaconu

23 November 2008 Matchday 16	FC Argeş	3–2	Oțelul Galați	Piteşti
19:00	Kamara 42'; Tameş 64'; Tănase 86', (yellow card) 87'	(Report)	Tănasă 23', 31', (yellow card) 45'; Sârghi (yellow card) 79'; Iorga (yellow card) 80'; Paraschiv (yellow card) 88'	Stadium: Nicolae Dobrin; Attendance: 2,000; Referee: Marius Martiş

29 November 2008 Matchday 17	Oțelul Galați	0–0	Pandurii Târgu Jiu	Galați
14:00	Costin (yellow card) 7'; Sălăgeanu (yellow card) 65'; Pena (yellow card) 80'; Viglianti (yellow card) 89'	(Report)	Popete (yellow card) 9'; Vancea (yellow card) 45'; Murgan (yellow card) 65'; Ghindeanu (yellow card) 88'	Stadium: Oțelul; Attendance: 8,000; Referee: Marius Avram

28 February 2009 Matchday 18	Oțelul Galați	3–1	Gaz Metan	Galați
15:00	Paraschiv 12', 44'; Sălăgeanu (yellow card) 18'; Iorga 38'; Zhelev (yellow card) 50'		Todea 18'; Semeghin (yellow card) 45'	Stadium: Oțelul; Attendance: 6,000; Referee: Augustus Constantin

7 March 2009 Matchday 19	CS Otopeni	0–1	Oțelul Galați	Ploieşti
17:00	Lazić (yellow card) 26'; Ivan (yellow card) 31'		Pena 41'; Costin (yellow card) 85'	Stadium: Astra; Attendance: 2,500; Referee: Alexandru Deaconu

14 March 2009 Matchday 20	Oțelul Galați	1–2	Gloria Buzău	Galați
15:00	Cârjă (yellow card) 16'; Viglianti 33'		Axente 36', (yellow card) 37'; Cârjă 67' (o.g.); Ademar (yellow card) 76'; Matei (yellow card) 89'; Mincă (yellow card) 90+2'	Stadium: Oțelul; Attendance: 5,000; Referee: Marian Bordean

21 March 2009 Matchday 21	Rapid București	4–0	Oțelul Galați	Bucharest
20:30	Herea 33', (yellow card) 34'; Grigorie 51'; Spadacio 82'; Grigore 90+3'			Stadium: Giuleşti; Attendance: 6,000; Referee: Teodor Crăciunescu

5 April 2009 Matchday 22	Oțelul Galați	0–2	Universitatea Craiova	Galați
17:00	Paraschiv (yellow card) 30'; Bourceanu (yellow card) 36'; Ilie (yellow card) 55'; Zhivko Zhelev (yellow card) 67'		F. Costea 9'; Găman (yellow card) 10'; Wobay 40'; M. Costea (yellow card) 49'	Stadium: Oțelul; Attendance: 8,000; Referee: Ovidiu Haţegan

8 April 2009 Matchday 23	SC Vaslui	2–1	Oțelul Galați	Vaslui
17:00	Cânu 6'; Pavlović 17'; Farkas (yellow card) 59'; Wesley (yellow card) 89'		Elek 54'; Cârjă (yellow card) 87'	Stadium: Municipal; Attendance: 4,000; Referee: Marian Bordean

12 April 2009 Matchday 24	Oțelul Galați	3–2	Politehnica Iaşi	Galați
17:00	Bourceanu 25' (pen.); Sălăgeanu 29'; S. Ilie (yellow card) 31'; Sârghi (yellow card) 32'; Zhelev (yellow card) 65', (goal) 78'; Elek (yellow card) 76'; Kolev (yellow card) 88'	(Report)	Bâlbă 15'; A. Ilie (yellow card) 24'; Onuţ (yellow card) 28'; Cristea 45+1', (yellow card) 88'; Viveiros (yellow card) 71'	Stadium: Oțelul; Attendance: 5,000; Referee: Marius Avram

18 April 2009 Matchday 25	Gloria Bistriţa	3–0	Oțelul Galați	Bistriţa
15:00	Diogo 17'; Coroian (yellow card) 25', (goal) 47'; Zaharia 79'		Costin (yellow card) 50' (yellow-red card) 84'; Sălăgeanu (yellow card) 72'	Stadium: Gloria; Attendance: 500; Referee: Sebastian Colţescu

21 April 2009 Matchday 26	Oțelul Galați	2–0	Farul Constanţa	Galați
17:00	Iorga 56'; Gado (yellow card) 58'; Ibeh 72'; Tănasă (yellow card) 84'			Stadium: Oțelul; Attendance: 5,000; Referee: Ionel Ivan

25 April 2009 Matchday 27	CFR Cluj	1–1	Oțelul Galați	Cluj-Napoca
20:30	Mureşan (red card) 41'; Koné 64'; Mara (yellow card) 82'		Zhelev 42'; Râpă (yellow card) 45'; Ibeh (yellow card) 74'; Gado (yellow card) 86'; Cârjă (yellow card) 90+2'	Stadium: Dr. Constantin Rădulescu; Attendance: 5,000; Referee: Marian Bordean

1 May 2009 Matchday 28	Steaua București	5–0	Oțelul Galați	Bucharest
20:45	P. Marin (yellow card) 15'; Stancu 33'; Goian 45+2' (pen.); Toja (yellow card) 55', (goal) 58'; Dayro Moreno 67'; Golański (yellow card) 78'; Kapetanos 85'		Giurgiu (red card) 45+1'; Iorga (yellow card) 78'; Râpă (yellow card) 78'	Stadium: Steaua; Attendance: 5,000; Referee: Alexandru Tudor

5 May 2009 Matchday 29	Oțelul Galați	0–1	Dinamo București	Galați
16:00	Ilie (yellow card) 45'; Kolev (yellow card) 82'		Moţi (yellow card) 21'; Dănciulescu 34'; Bruno Simao (yellow card) 35'; Goian (yellow card) 61'; Matache (yellow card) 90+1'	Stadium: Oțelul; Attendance: 10,000; Referee: Victor Berbecaru

9 May 2009 Matchday 30	FC Timișoara	1–0	Oțelul Galați	Timișoara
17:00	Bucur 23'; Scutaru (yellow card) 74'; Latovlevici (yellow card) 77'		Bourceanu (yellow card) 60'	Stadium: Dan Păltinişanu; Attendance: 5,000; Referee: Georgian Ionescu

17 May 2009 Matchday 31	Oțelul Galați	0–2	Unirea Urziceni	Galați
17:00	Ilie (yellow card) 36'; Cârjă (yellow card) 74' (yellow-red card) 78'		Varga 66'; Bilaşco (yellow card) 77'; Onofraş 90'; Apostol (yellow card) 90+3'	Stadium: Oțelul; Attendance: 6,000; Referee: Yuri Baskakov (Russia)

22 May 2009 Matchday 32	FC Brașov	1–1	Oțelul Galați	Braşov
18:00	Abrudan 29'; Oroş (yellow card) 86'; Măldărăşanu (yellow card) 90'		Bourceanu (yellow card) 11' (yellow-red card) 83'; Ibeh (yellow card) 53'; Pena 75'; Sârghi (yellow card) 86'; Zhelev (yellow card) 89'	Stadium: Silviu Ploeşteanu; Attendance: 2,000; Referee: Marius Avram

31 May 2009 Matchday 33	Oțelul Galați	2–0	FC Argeş	Galați
18:00	Ibeh 13', (yellow card) 76'; Giurgiu (yellow card) 18'; Pena 30' (pen.); Costin (yellow card) 51'; Tănasă (yellow card) 60'		Bălaşa (red card) 29'; Poenaru (yellow card) 69'	Stadium: Oțelul; Attendance: 10,000; Referee: Ciprian Danşa

10 June 2009 Matchday 34	Pandurii Târgu Jiu	1–0	Oțelul Galați	Târgu Jiu
20:00	Vasilache 4' (pen.), (yellow card) 74'; Martinović (yellow card) 10'		Kolev (yellow card) 4' (yellow-red card) 72'; Ilie (yellow card) 42'; Zhelev (yellow card) 45'	Stadium: Tudor Vladimirescu; Attendance: 2,200; Referee: Cristian Balaj

=== Cupa României ===
14 October 2008 Round of 32	Tricolorul Breaza	1–2	Oțelul Galați	Breaza
14:30	Tudor (yellow card) 24'; Vasilescu 61', (yellow card) 70'	(Report)	Viglianti (yellow card) 55', (goal) 66'; Kolev (yellow card) 71'; Tudor 86' (o.g.)	Stadium: Parc; Attendance: 1,500; Referee: Radu Petrescu

11 November 2008 Round of 16	Unirea Urziceni	1–0	Oțelul Galați	Buzău
14:45	Burns (yellow card) 22'; Dănălache 82'		Bourceanu (yellow card) 26'; Cârjă (yellow card) 61'; Zhelev (yellow card) 76'	Stadium: Municipal; Attendance: 2,000; Referee: Aurelian Bogaciu

== Players ==
=== Squad statistics ===
				Total			Liga I		Cupa României	
No.	Pos.	Nat.	Name	Sts	App	Gls	App	Gls	App	Gls
0	FW	(Romania)	Anca	2	4		4			
10	MF	(Romania)	Avram	1	3		3			
5	DM	(Romania)	Bourceanu	32	32	1	31	1	1	
2	FB	(Romania)	Cârjă	16	22		20		2	
0	FB	(Romania)	Cojoc	8	10		9		1	
18	CB	(Romania)	Costin	32	33		31		2	
7	FW	(Romania)	Elek	9	17	1	17	1		
11	FB	(Romania)	Gado	2	15		14		1	
20	RM	(Romania)	Gârleanu	3	3		3			
29	CM	(Romania)	Giurgiu	14	16		16			
1	GK	(Lithuania)	Grybauskas	3	4		3		1	
15	LW	(Nigeria)	Ibeh	8	15	2	15	2		
14	FW	(Romania)	Ilie	19	26	1	26	1		
6	AM	(Romania)	Iorga	25	29	3	27	3	2	
0	MF	(Romania)	Ioviţă	1	4		4			
12	GK	(Bulgaria)	Kolev	33	33		32		1	
0	MF	(Romania)	Neagu		2		2			
0	MF	(Bosnia and Herzegovina)	Nikolić	3	9		7		2	
0	CB	(Burkina Faso)	Nogo	2	2		2			
30	AM	(Romania)	Paraschiv	20	23	9	22	9	1	
27	FW	(Romania)	Pena	26	31	6	30	6	1	
3	DF	(Romania)	Râpă	9	9		9			
23	FB	(Romania)	Sălăgeanu	30	30	1	28	1	2	
16	FB	(Romania)	Sârghi	20	21		19		2	
4	CM	(Romania)	Schwartz		1		1			
0	MF	(Romania)	Stancu	1	10		9		1	
17	FW	(Romania)	Tănasă	10	17	3	15	3	2	
8	MF	(Romania)	Tişmănaru		6		6			
37	AM	(Argentina)	Viglianti	23	23	6	21	5	2	1
19	MF	(Croatia)	Vitaić	12	19	1	17	1	2	
31	CB	(Bulgaria)	Zhelev	32	32	2	30	2	2	

Last updated: 2009-06-10
Source: official website and Viaţa Liberă
Ordered by player name
0 shown as blank

=== Transfers ===
==== In ====
No.	Pos.	Nat.	Name	Age	EU	Moving from	Type	Transfer window	Ends	Transfer fee	Source
	MF	(Romania)	Ioviţă	24	EU	Gloria Buzău	Transfer	Summer	2010	Free	
	FW	(Romania)	Pena	23	EU	Chiajna	Transfer	Summer	2011	€70,000	
	FW	(Romania)	Anca	32	EU	CFR Cluj	Transfer	Summer	2010	Free	
	MF	(Romania)	Stancu	30	EU	Rapid București	Transfer	Summer	2011	Free	
	MF	(Romania)	Bourceanu	23	EU	Dunărea Galați	Transfer	Summer	2012	€60,000 + 50%	
	FW	(Bosnia and Herzegovina)	Nikolić	23	Non-EU	Modriča (Bosnia and Herzegovina)	Transfer	Summer	2011	€150,000	
	MF	(Croatia)	Vitaić	26	Non-EU	Šibenik (Croatia)	Transfer	Summer	2011	€100,000	
	FW	(Romania)	Tănasă	23	EU	Bacău	Transfer	Summer	2011	€80,000	
	FW	(Lithuania)	Labukas	24	EU	Inter Baku (Azerbaijan)	Loan return	Winter		–	
	DF	(Bosnia and Herzegovina)	Hodzurda	18	Non-EU	Željezničar (Bosnia and Herzegovina)	Transfer	Winter	2012	Undisclosed	
	DF	(Bosnia and Herzegovina)	Šipović	18	Non-EU	Željezničar (Bosnia and Herzegovina)	Transfer	Winter	2012	Undisclosed	
	MF	(Nigeria)	Ibeh	22	EU	UTA Arad	Transfer	Winter	2012	Free	
	DM	(Romania)	Giurgiu	26	EU	Rubin Kazan (Russia)	Transfer	Winter		Free	

==== Out ====
No.	Pos.	Nat.	Name	Age	EU	Moving to	Type	Transfer window	Transfer fee	Source
–	MF	(Romania)	Deac	22	EU	CFR Cluj	Loan end	Summer	–	
–	MF	(Romania)	Giurgiu	25	EU	Rubin Kazan (Russia)	Loan end	Summer	–	
–	MF	(Romania)	Székely	24	EU	Steaua București	Transfer	Summer	€1.50M + 15%	
–	FW	(Romania)	Jula	28	EU	Energie Cottbus (Germany)	Transfer	Summer	€0.7M + 20%	
–	FW	(Romania)	Stan	29	EU	Unirea Urziceni	Transfer	Summer	€150,000	
–	MF	(Romania)	Ionescu	22	EU		Mutual consent	Summer	–	
–	MF	(Romania)	Brujan	32	EU		Contract expired	Summer	–	
–	FW	(Romania)	Anca	32	EU		Mutual consent	Summer	–	
–	FW	(Lithuania)	Labukas	24	EU	Inter Baku (Azerbaijan)	Loan	Summer	n/a	

Last updated: 2009-03-09

== Club ==
=== Coaching staff ===
Position	Staff
Head coach	(Romania) Petre Grigoraş
Assistant coach	(Romania) Marian Dinu
Fitness coach	(Romania) Ionel Tămăşanu
Goalkeepers coach	(Romania) Dan Moţei

Source: otelul-galati.ro
