= Ioviță =

Ioviță is a Romanian surname. Notable people with the surname include:

- Adrian Iovita (born 1954), Romanian-Canadian mathematician
- Valentin Ioviță (1984–2024), Romanian footballer
- Vlad Ioviță (1935–1983), film director, writer, and publicist
