= Florin Petcu =

Romanian footballer

Personal information
- Full name: Florin Lucian Petcu
- Date of birth: 2 April 1976 (age 50)
- Place of birth: Bacău, Romania
- Height: 1.76 m (5 ft 9 in)
- Position: Forward

Youth career
- Selena Bacău

Senior career*
Years	Team	Apps	(Gls)
1993–1994	Cotidian Selena Bacău		
1994–2000	FCM Bacău	116	(33)
1994–1995	→ Acord Focșani (loan)	28	(3)
1995–1996	→ Petrolul Moinești (loan)		
2000–2001	Național București	26	(4)
2002–2006	FCM Bacău	100	(25)
2003–2004	→ FC Vaslui (loan)	7	(0)
2006–2007	Ashdod		
2007–2008	Pambac Bacău		
2008	FCM Bacău		
Total		277	(65)

Managerial career
- 2015–2017: Sporting Bacău (youth)
- 2017–: Kids 2017 Bacău (youth)
- * Club domestic league appearances and goals as of 26 November 2019

Florin Lucian Petcu (born 2 April 1976) is a Romanian former professional footballer who played as a forward for teams such as FCM Bacău, Național București or F.C. Ashdod, among others. After retirement, Petcu worked as a kids trainer at Sporting Bacău, then in 2017 he opened his own football school Kids 2017 Bacău.

== Honours ==
Petrolul Moinești

- Divizia C: 1995–96

FCM Bacău

- Cupa Ligii: 1998
