= Daniel Bogdan =

Romanian former professional footballer

Personal information
- Full name: Daniel Jean Bogdan
- Date of birth: 3 August 1971 (age 55)
- Place of birth: Călărași, Romania
- Height: 1.89 m (6 ft 2 in)
- Position: Goalkeeper

Youth career
- Unirea Focșani
- Selena Bacău

Senior career*
Years	Team	Apps	(Gls)
1992–2000	FCM Bacău	136	(0)
1994–1995	→ Acord Focșani (loan)	11	(0)
2000–2002	FC U Craiova	18	(0)
2002–2003	UTA Arad	23	(0)
2003–2006	FCM Bacău	42	(0)
2004	→ FC Vaslui (loan)	1	(0)
Total		231	(0)

Managerial career
- 2009: FCM Bacău (GK coach)
- * Club domestic league appearances and goals as of 26 November 2019

Daniel Jean Bogdan (born 3 August 1971) is a Romanian former professional footballer who played as a goalkeeper for teams such as FCM Bacău, FC U Craiova or UTA Arad, among others. After retirement, Bogdan was the goalkeeping coach of FCM Bacău during 2009, then in 2015 moved to Republic of Ireland, where he worked until 2017, when he moved again, this time to England, where he works as a driver for a company that has as activity the resale of cars.

== Honours ==
FCM Bacău

- Cupa Ligii: 1998
