= Costea =

Costea is a Romanian given name for males. It is also a quite common Romanian surname. It is a variant of the name Constantin.

== Notable bearers ==
- Costea of Moldavia
- Costea, the alleged great-grandfather of John Hunyadi

== As surname ==
- Florin Costea
- Mihai Costea
- Doru Romulus Costea
- Sergiu Costea
