= Viorel Ignătescu =

Romanian footballer

Personal information
- Full name: Viorel Vasile Ignătescu
- Date of birth: 1 January 1977 (age 49)
- Place of birth: Bacău, Romania
- Height: 1.97 m (6 ft 6 in)
- Position: Goalkeeper

Youth career
- Letea Bacău

Senior career*
Years	Team	Apps	(Gls)
1995–1996	Rafinăria Dărmănești		
1996–2010	FCM Bacău	93	(0)
1998–1999	→ Politehnica Timișoara (loan)	8	(0)
2010–2011	SC Bacău		
Total		112	(2)

Managerial career
- 2011–2016: SC Bacău (GK coach)
- * Club domestic league appearances and goals as of 27 November 2019

Viorel Vasile Ignătescu (born 1 January 1977) is a Romanian former footballer who played as a goalkeeper mainly for FCM Bacău, but also for teams such as Politehnica Timișoara or SC Bacău. After retirement he was the goalkeeping coach of SC Bacău, then in 2016 moved to England where he works as a driver.

== Honours ==
FCM Bacău

- Cupa Ligii: 1998
