= Florin Ganea =

Romanian footballer

Personal information
- Date of birth: 4 April 1976
- Place of birth: Bacău, Romania
- Date of death: 9 September 2015 (aged 39)
- Place of death: Bacău, Romania
- Height: 1.77 m (5 ft 10 in)
- Position: Left back

Youth career
- FCM Bacău

Senior career*
Years	Team	Apps	(Gls)
1993–2006	FCM Bacău	214	(4)
1995–1996	→ Cetatea Târgu Neamț (loan)	26	(4)
2002–2003	→ Laminorul Roman (loan)		
2006–2007	Unirea Urziceni	13	(0)
2008	Gloria Bistrița	11	(0)
2008–2009	Știința Bacău	27	(0)
Total		291	(8)
- * Club domestic league appearances and goals as of 27 November 2019

Florin Ganea (4 April 1976 – 9 September 2015) was a Romanian professional footballer who played as a left back for teams such as FCM Bacău, Cetatea Târgu Neamț, Unirea Urziceni or Gloria Bistrița, among others.

He died in 2015, at only 39 years old, when he suffered a heart attack during a five-a-side football match.

== Honours ==
FCM Bacău

- Divizia B: 1994–95
- Cupa Ligii: 1998
