= Vasile Ardeleanu =

Romanian footballer (1974–2025)

Personal information
- Full name: Vasile Maricel Ardeleanu
- Date of birth: 5 February 1974
- Place of birth: Bacău, Romania
- Date of death: 16 January 2025 (aged 50)
- Place of death: Cârligi, Romania
- Height: 1.93 m (6 ft 4 in)
- Position: Centre-back

Youth career
- FC Bacău

Senior career*
Years	Team	Apps	(Gls)
1993–2004	FCM Bacău	105	(8)
1994–1995	→ Acord Focșani (loan)	13	(1)
2000–2002	→ FC Onești (loan)	19	(0)
2004–2005	FC Vaslui	0	(0)
Total		137	(9)
- * Club domestic league appearances and goals

Vasile Maricel Ardeleanu (5 February 1974 – 16 January 2025) was a Romanian professional footballer who played as a centre-back for FCM Bacău, Acord Focșani, FC Onești and FC Vaslui.

== Career ==
Ardeleanu played almost all his career for FCM Bacău, being one of the prospective players of the Moldavian club. In 1999 Ardeleanu's career took a negative turn after a horror foul made by Marius Lăcătuș in the 13th minute of a match between Steaua București and FCM Bacău. Doctors' diagnosis was double transverse fracture of tibia and fibula, plus rupture of ligaments and although the end of his career was anticipated, Ardeleanu was back on the pitch one year later, playing for FC Onești, on loan from FCM Bacău.

Even if he had fully recovered, as Ardeleanu himself recognized years later, things had changed. After the accident in 1999 I started smoking. I quickly reached 120 kilos, but then I dropped 40 kilos in one month. After some sporadic appearances at FC Onești and FCM Bacău, Ardeleanu retired only a few years later, in 2005, at the age of 31.

== Personal life and death ==
Ardeleanu lived in the village of Cârligi, Filipești commune, where he was working as a day laborer and playing sporadically for amateur team of the commune, AS Filipești.

Ardeleanu died at his house in Cârligi, on 16 January 2025, at the age of 50.

== Honours ==
FCM Bacău

- Cupa Ligii: 1998
