= Florian Ambru =

Romanian footballer

Personal information
- Date of birth: 1928
- Place of birth: Romania
- Position: Defender

Senior career*
Years	Team	Apps	(Gls)
1946–1948	Ciocanul București	45	(0)
1948–1953	Dinamo București	62	(4)
1954	Dinamo Bacău		
Total		107	(4)

International career
1950	Romania	1	(0)

Managerial career
- 1955–1956: Dinamo Bacău
- 1960–1961: Ceahlăul Piatra Neamț
- * Club domestic league appearances and goals

Florian Ambru (born 1928) was a Romanian football defender and manager. On 21 November 1948 he played in the first ever CSCA București - Dinamo București derby.

== International career ==
Florian Ambru appeared in one friendly game at international level for Romania, under coach Emerich Vogl in a 6–0 victory against Albania played at the Republic stadium, Bucharest.

== Honours ==
=== Manager ===
FCM Bacău

- Divizia B: 1955
