= Barbu Știrbei National College =

Romanian high school

Coordinates: 44.2060°N 27.3112°E

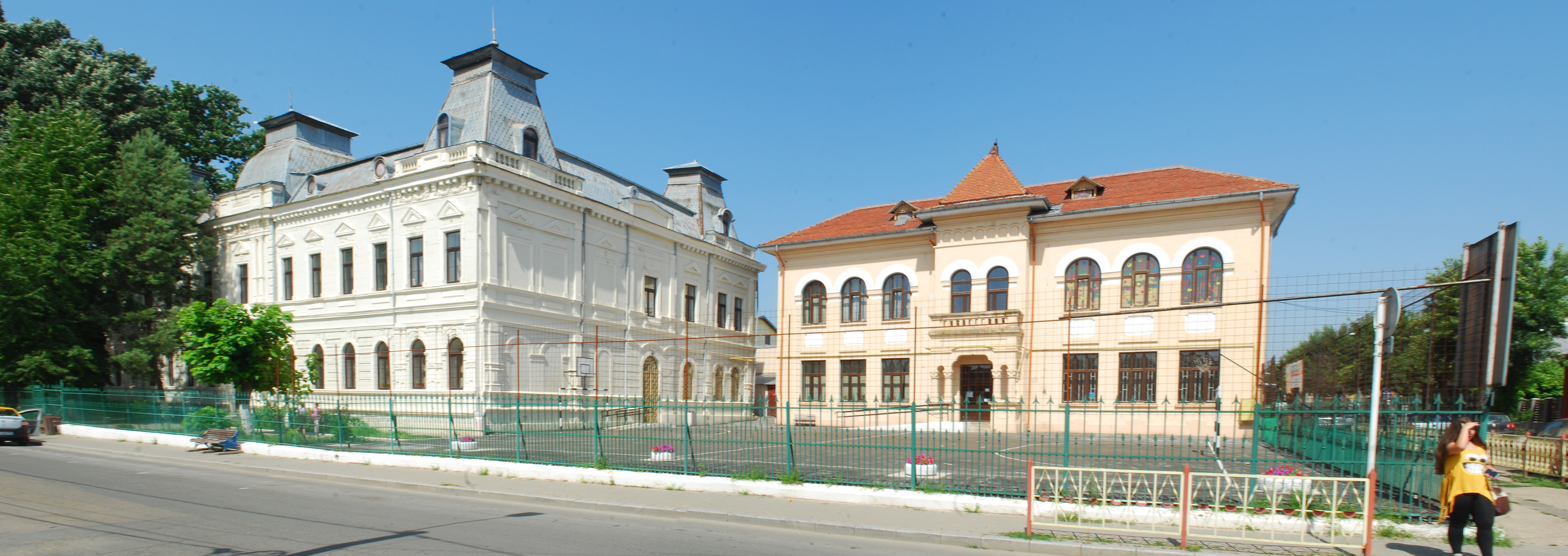
The former high school building (right), now a middle school

Barbu Știrbei National College (Romanian: Colegiul Național Barbu Știrbei) is a high school located at 159 București Street, Călărași, Romania.

In 1864, the sum of 20,000 lei was allocated for the construction of a new school in Călărași. Although, the amount was paid repeatedly, it was used for other purposes until 1881, when the cornerstone was finally laid. The building was completed in 1884, leading to the inauguration of a real gymnasium. The institution soon acquired prestige, and was named after Prince Barbu Dimitrie Știrbei in 1984, following the initiative of faculty members.

In 1919, the former gymnasium was transformed to a high school. A dormitory accommodating 70 pupils opened in 1940 and girls were first admitted in 1956. The following year, the school was renamed after Nicolae Bălcescu. A new building was inaugurated in 1962, and the Știrbei name was restored in 1992, after the Romanian Revolution. In 1999, the school was declared a national college.

The old school building is listed as a historic monument by Romania's Ministry of Culture and Religious Affairs.
