= List of cities and towns on the river Danube =

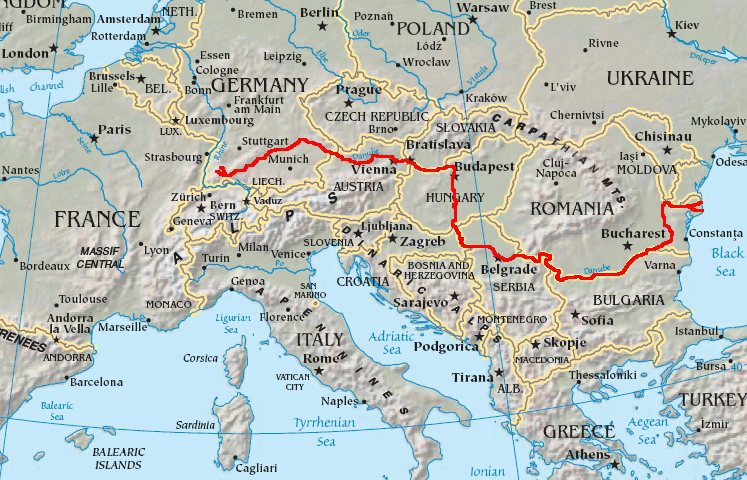
Map of the Danube and the major cities it passes through

This is a list of the cities and towns on the river Danube. This list does not include parts of cities, suburbs, neighbourhoods etc. Any city or town that is located on the bank of the Danube can be included in this list. The cities and towns on Danube could be sorted by various criteria. The main list of this article sorts the cities and towns on the Danube by the current number of inhabitants within the city/town limits. More lists may be added to this article with sorting the cities and towns on the Danube by different other criteria. A separate list of villages and other smaller inhabited places on Danube may be added in this article as well.

== List ==
‡ First Roman town on the site

Bold: capital of the country

Italic: capital of the administrative region

| Rank | Name of city / town | Image | Inhabitants | Established | Present country | Notes |
|---|---|---|---|---|---|---|
| 1 | **Vienna** | | **2,031,870** (01.07.2025) | ~100 AD | Austria | The capital and largest city in Austria. |
| 2 | **Budapest** | | **1,671,004** (01.01.2023) | 1873 | Hungary | The capital and largest city in Hungary. |
| 3 | **Belgrade** | | **1,298,661** (2022) | 279 BC | Serbia | The capital and largest city in Serbia. |
| 4 | **Bratislava** | | **475,503** (2021) | 907 AD | Slovakia | The capital and largest city in Slovakia. |
| 5 | Novi Sad | | **325,551** (2022) | 1748 | Serbia | The second-largest city in Serbia and administrative center of the province of **Vojvodina**. |
| 6 | Galați | | **217,851** (2021) | 1445 | Romania | The largest Danubian city in Romania and seat of **Galați county**. |
| 7 | Linz | | **212,538** (01.01.2024) | ~150 AD | Austria | The capital city of **Upper Austria** and second-largest Danubian city in Austria. |
| 8 | Regensburg | | **157,443** (31.12.2022) | 179 AD | Germany | The largest Danubian city in Germany. |
| 9 | Brăila | | **154,686** (01.12.2021) | ~1370 | Romania | The second-largest Danubian city in Romania and seat of **Brăila county**. |
| 10 | Ingolstadt | | **141,029** (31.12.2022) | 806 AD (~1250 – city status) | Germany | The second-largest Danubian city in Germany. |
| 11 | Ulm | | **128,928** (31.12.2022) | 854 AD | Germany | The third-largest Danubian city in Germany and home of the second-tallest church building in the world. |
| 12 | Ruse | | **123,134** (31.12.2022) | ~1650 (~150 AD‡) | Bulgaria | The capital of **Ruse Province** and largest Danubian city in Bulgaria. |
| 13 | Drobeta-Turnu Severin | | **79,865** (01.12.2021) | 121 AD | Romania | The third-largest Danubian city in Romania and seat of **Mehedinți county**. |
| 14 | Pančevo | | **73,401** (2022) | 1153 (1873 – city status) | Serbia | The second-largest Danubian city in **Vojvodina** and third in Serbia. |
| 15 | Izmail | | **69,932** (01.01.2022) | 1589 (1830 – city status) | Ukraine | The largest Danubian city in Ukraine and seat of **Izmail raion**. |
| 16 | Tulcea | | **65,624** (01.12.2021) | 1506 (1860 – city status) | Romania | The fourth-largest Danubian city in Romania and seat of **Tulcea county**. |
| 17 | Neu-Ulm | | **61,043** (31.12.2022) | 1814 | Germany | The fourth-largest Danubian city in Germany. |
| 18 | Smederevo | | **59,261** (2022) | 1430 | Serbia | The fourth-largest Danubian city in Serbia. |
| 19 | Călăraşi | | **58,211** (01.12.2021) | 1700 (1833 – city status) | Romania | The fifth-largest Danubian city in Romania and seat of **Călărași county**. |
| 20 | Giurgiu | | **54,551** (01.12.2021) | 1395 (~550 AD‡) | Romania | The sixth-largest Danubian city in Romania and seat of **Giurgiu county**. |
| 21 | Passau | | **53,907** (31.12.2022) | ~100 BC | Germany | The fifth-largest Danubian city in Germany. |
| 22 | Straubing | | **49,164** (31.12.2022) | ~100 AD | Germany | The sixth-largest Danubian city in Germany. |
| 23 | Dunakeszi | Dunakeszi from above | **43,061** (01.01.2023) | ~1000 | Hungary | The second-largest Danubian city in Hungary. |
| 24 | Dunaújváros | | **40,969** (01.01.2023) | 1951 | Hungary | The third-largest Danubian city in Hungary. |
| 25 | Vidin | | **36,490** (31.12.2022) | ~250 BC | Bulgaria | The capital of **Vidin Province** and the second-largest Danubian city in Bulgaria. |
| 26 | Deggendorf | | **35,172** (31.12.2022) | 868 (1212 – town status) | Germany | The seventh-largest Danubian city in Germany. |
| 27 | Vác | | **33,285** (01.01.2023) | 1074 | Hungary | The fourth-largest Danubian city in Hungary. |
| 28 | Komárno | | **32,287** (31.12.2022) | 1075 | Slovakia | The second-largest Danubian city in Slovakia. |
| 29 | Baja | | **31,571** (01.01.2023) | 1308 | Hungary | The fifth-largest Danubian city in Hungary. |
| 30 | Silistra | | **29,498** (2021) | 29 AD | Bulgaria | The capital of **Silistra Province** and third-largest Danubian city in Bulgaria. |
| 31 | Fetești | | **27,465** (01.12.2021) | ~1500 | Romania | The seventh-largest Danubian city in Romania. |
| 32 | Svishtov | | **26,093** (2020) | 69 AD | Bulgaria | The fourth-largest Danubian city in Bulgaria. |
| 33 | Bačka Palanka | | **25,476** (2022) | | Serbia | The third-largest Danubian city in **Vojvodina** and fifth in Serbia. |
| 34 | Krems an der Donau | | **25,271** (01.01.2023) | 1305 | Austria | The third-largest Danubian city in Austria. |
| 35 | Vukovar | | **22,255** (2021) | 1231 | Croatia | The largest Danubian city in Croatia. |
| 36 | Esztergom | | **19,818** (01.01.2023) | 972 | Hungary | The sixth-largest Danubian city in Hungary. |
| 37 | Kiliia | | **18,745** (2022) | 1479 | Ukraine | The second-largest Danubian city in Ukraine. |
| 38 | Lom | | **18,593** (2021) | 1695 | Bulgaria | The fifth-largest Danubian city in Bulgaria. |
| 39 | Vilshofen an der Donau | | **17,960** (31.12.2022) | 776 (1212 – town status) | Germany | The largest town in the Passau district. |
| 40 | Reni | | **17,736** (2022) | 1548 | Ukraine | The third-largest Danubian city in Ukraine. |
| 41 | Cernavodă | | **15,088** (01.12.2021) | ~300 BC | Romania | The eighth-largest Danubian city in Romania. |
| 42 | Apatin | | **14,613** (2022) | 1011 | Serbia | The fourth-largest Danubian city in **Vojvodina** and sixth in Serbia. |
| 43 | Calafat | | **13,807** (01.12.2021) | ~1400 | Romania | The ninth-largest Danubian city in Romania. |
| 44 | Corabia | | **13,527** (01.12.2021) | 1871 | Romania | The tenth-largest Danubian city in Romania. |
| 45 | Štúrovo | | **9,322** (31.12.2024) | 1075 | Slovakia | The third-largest Danubian city in Slovakia. |
| 46 | Orșova | | **8,506** (01.12.2021) | ~100 AD | Romania | The eleventh-largest Danubian town in Romania. |
| 47 | Ilok | | **3,842** (2021) | 1231 | Croatia | The second-largest Danubian town in Croatia. |
| 48 | Giurgiulești (village) | | **2,866** (2014) | 1527 | Moldova | The only Danubian settlement in Moldova. |
