= Călărași =

- Municipality
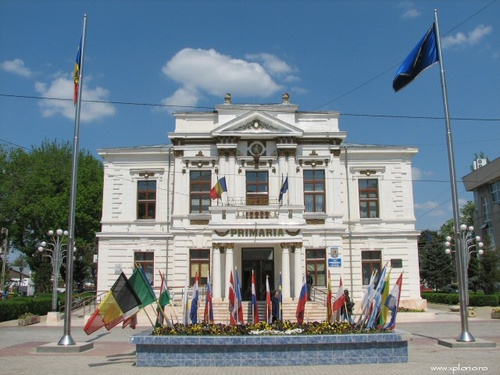
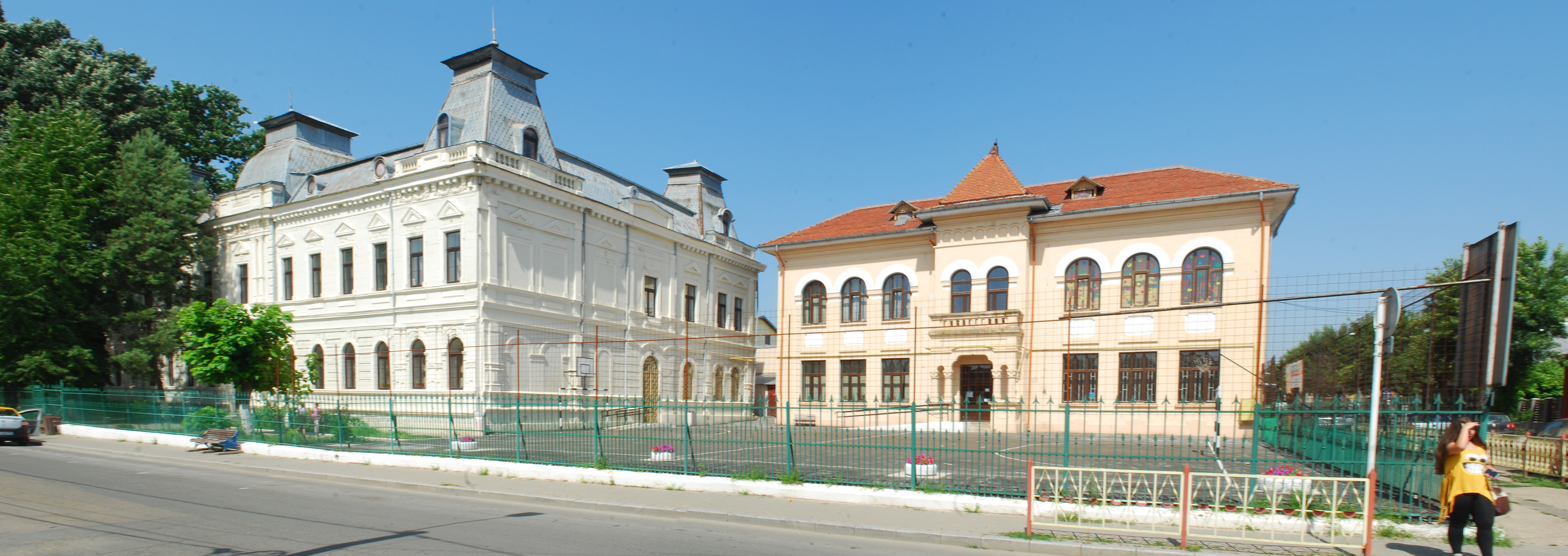
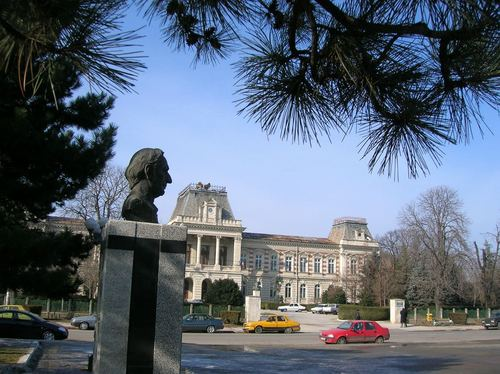
- Old city hall, now the city museum Barbu Știrbei National College Palace of the Prefecture

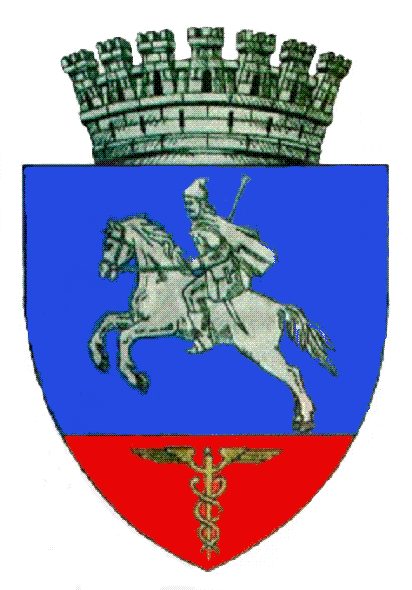
- Coat of arms

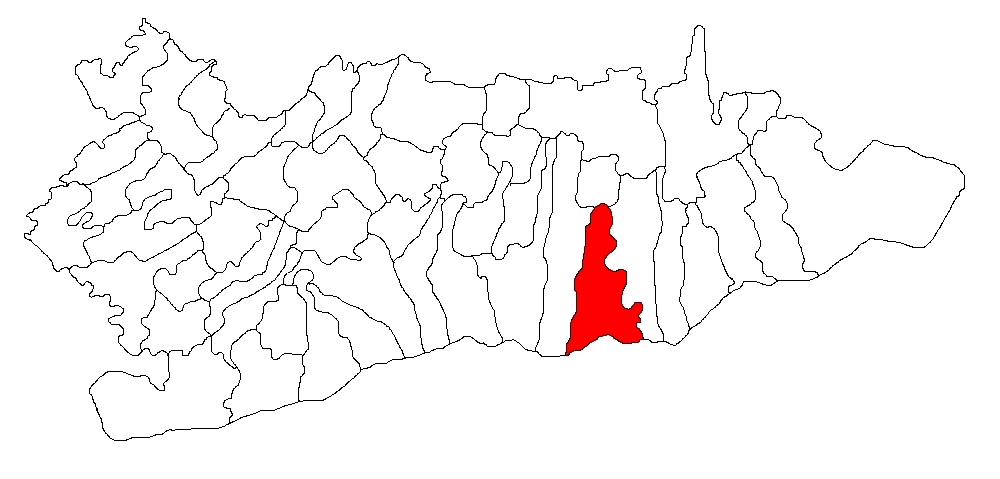
- Location within the county

- Location in Romania
- Coordinates: 44°12′N 27°20′E
- Country: Romania
- County: Călărași

Government
  - Mayor (2024–2028): Marius-Grigore Dulce (PSD)
- Area: 133.22 km^{2} (51.44 sq mi)
- Elevation: 13 m (43 ft)
- Population (2021-12-01): 58,211
  - Density: 436.95/km^{2} (1,131.7/sq mi)
- Time zone: UTC+02:00 (EET)
  - Summer (DST): UTC+03:00 (EEST)
- Postal code: 910001–910165
- Vehicle reg.: CL
- Website: www.primariacalarasi.ro

Călărași (Romanian pronunciation: [kələˈraʃʲ]; Bulgarian: Кълъраш, romanized: Kŭlŭrash), the capital of Călărași County in the Muntenia region, is situated in south-east Romania, on the banks of the Danube's Borcea branch, at about 12 kilometres (7 miles) from the Bulgarian border and 125 kilometres (78 miles) from Bucharest. It is one of six Romanian county seats lying on the river Danube.

The city is an industrial centre for lumber and paper, food processing, glass manufacturing, textiles, medical equipment production, and heavy industry, the last one represented by the Călărași steel works. The city is known colloquially as "Capșa provinciei" (the Capșa from the provinces).

== History ==
The site of a medieval village, called Lichirești from the time of Michael the Brave. Călărași appeared for the first time in 1700 on a map drawn by Constantin Cantacuzino. It got its name after it was made by the Wallachian princes, in the 17th century, a station of "mounted couriers' service" on the route from Bucharest to Constantinople. The service was operated by horseback riders (the călărași). It expanded into a small town, and in 1834 became the surrounding county's capital.

== Transportation ==
Călărași is connected by National Roads DN3, DN21, DN31, and DN3B. Also A2 ("The Sun's Motorway") has 3 exits for Călărași, at Lehliu Gară (about 50 km (31 mi) NW), Dragalina (about 30 km (19 mi) N) and Fetești (about 40 km (25 mi) NE). The city lies on the seventh pan-European corridor of transport (the Danube river) and is next to the fourth pan-European transport corridor (Dresden–Constanța) at 26 km (16 mi). The Călărași train station serves the CFR Line 802. The nearest major cities are: Bucharest 120 km (75 mi), Constanța 148 km (92 mi), and Varna 155 km (96 mi).

== Education ==
The city features seven middle schools and several high schools, including:

- Barbu Știrbei National College
- Mihai Eminescu Theoretical High School
- Ștefan Bănulescu Technical High School
- Danubius High School
- Sandu Aldea Agricultural College
- Călărași Economics College

== Sports ==
The city is currently represented by Dunărea Călărași in the Romanian Liga III football league.

== Natives ==
- Ștefan Bănică Sr. (1933–1995), actor, singer
- Daniel Bogdan (b. 1971), footballer
- Mircea Ciumara (1943–2012), politician
- Vladimir Constantinescu (1895–1965), general
- Maria Cuțarida-Crătunescu (1857–1919), first female doctor in Romania
- Daniel Florea (b. 1972), politician
- Petre V. Haneș (1879–1966), literary historian
- Dan Mateescu (1911–2008), engineer, titular member of the Romanian Academy
- Marius Mocanu (b. 1986), handballer
- Barbu Nemțeanu (1887–1919), poet
- Gabriel Popa (b. 1985), footballer
- Dragoș Protopopescu (1892–1948), writer, poet
- Gabriel Simion (b. 1998), footballer

== Twin towns ==
Călărași is twinned with:

- Rivery, France
- Naples, Italy
- (United States) Royal Palm Beach, Florida, USA
- Hengyang, China
- Zajecar, Serbia
- Călărași, Moldova
- Levy, Canada
- Silistra, Bulgaria

== Climate ==
The climate is continental with a year average temperature of 11.3 °C (52 °F). The lowest temperature ever recorded in Călărași was −30.0 °C (−22 °F) on January 9, 1938, and the highest was 42.3 °C (108 °F) on July 5, 2000.

Climate data for Călărași (1991–2020, extremes 1981-present)
Month	Jan	Feb	Mar	Apr	May	Jun	Jul	Aug	Sep	Oct	Nov	Dec	Year
Record high °C (°F)	20.9 (69.6)	23.3 (73.9)	30.0 (86.0)	32.6 (90.7)	37.5 (99.5)	40.3 (104.5)	42.3 (108.1)	41.1 (106.0)	37.5 (99.5)	33.6 (92.5)	30.5 (86.9)	21.3 (70.3)	42.3 (108.1)
Mean daily maximum °C (°F)	3.6 (38.5)	6.8 (44.2)	12.5 (54.5)	18.9 (66.0)	24.6 (76.3)	28.8 (83.8)	31.0 (87.8)	31.1 (88.0)	25.7 (78.3)	18.8 (65.8)	11.7 (53.1)	5.3 (41.5)	18.2 (64.8)
Daily mean °C (°F)	−0.4 (31.3)	1.8 (35.2)	6.5 (43.7)	12.1 (53.8)	17.7 (63.9)	22 (72)	24.1 (75.4)	23.6 (74.5)	18.4 (65.1)	12.3 (54.1)	6.7 (44.1)	1.3 (34.3)	12.2 (54.0)
Mean daily minimum °C (°F)	−3.7 (25.3)	−2.1 (28.2)	1.7 (35.1)	6.0 (42.8)	11.1 (52.0)	15.6 (60.1)	17.2 (63.0)	16.6 (61.9)	12.2 (54.0)	7.3 (45.1)	2.8 (37.0)	−2.0 (28.4)	6.9 (44.4)
Record low °C (°F)	−26.9 (−16.4)	−20.6 (−5.1)	−17.5 (0.5)	−4.2 (24.4)	−0.2 (31.6)	5.6 (42.1)	8.5 (47.3)	6.2 (43.2)	2.0 (35.6)	−7.3 (18.9)	−15.2 (4.6)	−19.6 (−3.3)	−26.9 (−16.4)
Average precipitation mm (inches)	39.6 (1.56)	27.5 (1.08)	39.4 (1.55)	40.9 (1.61)	50.5 (1.99)	65.7 (2.59)	52.3 (2.06)	41.8 (1.65)	52.1 (2.05)	49.0 (1.93)	45.1 (1.78)	45.3 (1.78)	549.2 (21.62)
Average precipitation days (≥ 1.0 mm)	6.8	4.8	5.8	6.6	7.5	7.4	6.2	4.2	4.8	5.2	5.5	6.9	71.7
Mean monthly sunshine hours	82.4	114.4	154.9	205.1	259.6	280.8	317.2	302.1	221.9	158.8	96.7	76.4	2,270.3
Source 1: NOAA
Source 2: Meteomanz (extremes since 2021)

== Population ==
Historical population
Year	Pop.	±%
1859	1,037	—
1900	11,024	+963.1%
1912	12,995	+17.9%
1930	18,053	+38.9%
1948	24,448	+35.4%
1956	25,555	+4.5%
1966	35,684	+39.6%
1977	49,727	+39.4%
1992	76,952	+54.7%
2002	70,039	−9.0%
2011	65,181	−6.9%
2021	58,211	−10.7%
Source: Census data

At the 2021 census, Călărași had a population 58,211. In 2011, it had a population of 65,181, with 95.05% of them declaring themselves as being Romanians and 3.59% Roma. The surrounding communes (Modelu, Ostrov, Roseți, Grădiștea, Cuza-Vodă, and Ștefan Vodă) together with Călărași number almost 100,000 inhabitants.
