= Souleymane Keita (Senegalese footballer) =

Senegalese footballer

Personal information
- Full name: Jules Souleymane Keita
- Date of birth: 4 November 1987 (age 39)
- Place of birth: Dakar, Senegal
- Height: 1.67 m (5 ft 6 in)
- Position: Midfielder

Senior career*
Years	Team	Apps	(Gls)
2007–2008	AS Marsa	10	(2)
2008–2009	Botoşani	16	(1)
2009–2012	Gloria Bistriţa	52	(7)
2012–2013	Politehnica Iași	17	(1)
2013–2015	Poli Timișoara	32	(1)
2015–2016	Baia Mare		
2016	Național Sebiș		
2016	Performanța Ighiu		
2017	CSMȘ Reșița		
- * Club domestic league appearances and goals as of 15 January 2018

Jules Souleymane Keita (born 4 November 1987) is a Senegalese footballer.

In 2012, as he did not extend his contract with Gloria Bistriţa, Keita was reportedly threatened with expulsion by the Romanian immigration authorities.

Having played for Național Sebiș, he was picked up by Performanța Ighiu in 2016 as "the first 'foreigner' in the team's history".

== Honours ==
ACS Poli Timișoara

- Romanian Second League: 2014–15
