= Daniel Alexandru David =

Romanian footballer

Daniel David
Personal information
- Full name: Daniel Alexandru David
- Date of birth: 3 October 1983 (age 43)
- Place of birth: Nehoiu, Romania
- Height: 1.83 m (6 ft 0 in)
- Position: Centre-back

Youth career
- FCM Bacău

Senior career*
Years	Team	Apps	(Gls)
2002–2009	FCM Bacău	103	(2)
2009–2010	Oțelul Galați	0	(0)
2010	Gostaresh Foulad		
2011	Botoșani	9	(0)
Total		112	(2)
- * Club domestic league appearances and goals

Daniel Alexandru David (born 3 October 1983) is a Romanian former pfofessional footballer who played as a centre-back for FCM Bacău, Oțelul Galați, Gostaresh Foulad and FC Botoșani.
