= Norbert Varga =

Romanian footballer

Personal information
- Full name: Norbert Iosif Varga
- Date of birth: 26 March 1980 (age 46)
- Place of birth: Arad, Romania
- Height: 1.83 m (6 ft 0 in)
- Positions: Midfielder; defender

Senior career*
Years	Team	Apps	(Gls)
2002–2003	Electromagnetica București	13	(1)
2003–2005	UTA Arad	56	(3)
2005–2006	Sportul Studenţesc	26	(1)
2006–2009	Wisła Kraków	24	(1)
2007–2008	→ UTA Arad (loan)	15	(2)
2009–2011	Unirea Alba Iulia	17	(0)
2011–2012	UTA Arad	21	(1)
2012–2013	Békéscsaba	22	(0)
2013–2015	UTA Arad	43	(2)
2015–2019	Gloria Cermei	78	(6)
2019–2022	FC 1929 Curtici	46	(3)
Total		358	(20)
- * Club domestic league appearances and goals

Norbert Iosif Varga (born 26 March 1980) is a Romanian former professional footballer who played as a defender or a midfielder.

On 10 February 2006, Wisła Kraków manager Dan Petrescu bought him from Sportul Studenţesc for an undisclosed fee.
