= Gabriel Siminic =

Romanian footballer

Personal information
- Date of birth: 11 March 1986 (age 40)
- Place of birth: Reșița, Romania
- Height: 1.77 m (5 ft 9 1/2 in)
- Position: Left back

Team information
- Current team: Gloria LT Cermei
- Number: 23

Youth career
- –2007: Politehnica Timișoara

Senior career*
Years	Team	Apps	(Gls)
2006–2007	Politehnica II Timișoara	24	(0)
2006–2009	Politehnica Timișoara	1	(0)
2007–2008	→ FCM Reșița (loan)	16	(0)
2008–2009	→ Gloria Buzău (loan)	8	(0)
2009–2010	Oțelul Galați	6	(0)
2010–2011	CSMS Iași	21	(1)
2011–2013	UTA Arad	40	(0)
2014–2016	Șoimii Pâncota	59	(0)
2016–2018	Național Sebiș	48	(2)
2018–2019	Crișul Chișineu-Criș	30	(0)
2019–2020	Dumbrăvița	13	(0)
2020–2023	Crișul Chișineu-Criș	63	(1)
2023–	Gloria LT Cermei	38	(5)
- * Club domestic league appearances and goals as of 22:09, 6 January 2025 (UTC)

Gabriel Siminic (born 11 March 1986) is a Romanian footballer. He plays as a left back for Gloria Lunca-Teuz Cermei.

== Career ==
=== Oțelul Galați ===
Siminic signed for Oțelul in July 2009, and after only one year he agreed a mutual departure with the club in June 2010.

=== CSMS Iași ===
Siminic joined CSMS Iași in the Summer of 2010.
