= Radek Opršal =

Czech footballer (born 1978)

Personal information
- Date of birth: 9 May 1978 (age 48)
- Place of birth: Ostrava, Czechoslovakia
- Height: 1.84 m (6 ft 0 in)
- Position: Centre-back

Senior career*
Years	Team	Apps	(Gls)
1998–1999	NH Ostrava	28	(2)
1999–2000	Hradec Králové	8	(0)
2000	Nitra	0	(0)
2000–2001	Košice	14	(0)
2001–2004	Inter Bratislava	51	(2)
2004	Zagłębie Lubin	1	(0)
2004–2005	Slovan Bratislava	0	(0)
2005–2006	Vítkovice	35	(0)
2006–2009	Progresul București	37	(2)
2009–2012	Astra Ploiești	71	(5)
Total		245	(11)
- * Club domestic league appearances and goals

Radek Opršal (born 9 May 1978) is a Czech former professional footballer who played as a defender.
