= William Arias =

Colombian footballer (born 1990)

Personal information
- Full name: William Orlando Arias Bermúdez
- Date of birth: 27 August 1990 (age 36)
- Place of birth: Bogotá, Colombia
- Height: 1.94 m (6 ft 4 in)
- Position: Goalkeeper

Team information
- Current team: Fk Borac

Senior career*
| Years | Team | Apps | (Gls) |
| 2008–2009 | Deportes Tolima | 4 | (0) |
| 2009–2012 | Oțelul Galați | 0 | (0) |
| 2010 | → Oțelul Galați II (loan) | 4 | (0) |
| 2011 | → Callatis Mangalia (loan) | | |
| 2012 | → CS Hunedoara (loan) | | |
| 2012 | Itagui Ditaires | | |
| 2013–2016 | Deportes Tolima | 1 | (0) |
| 2018 | Club Deportivo Universidad Cruceña | | |
| 2020–2022 | Fk Borac | | |
| Total | | 9 | (0) |
- * Club domestic league appearances and goals

William Orlando Arias Bermúdez (born 27 August 1990) is a Colombian footballer who plays as a goalkeeper for Jedinstvo Bihać.
