= Jean Christian N'Kongue =

Cameroonian footballer

Personal information
- Full name: Jean Christian Njoh N'Kongue
- Date of birth: 7 March 1983 (age 43)
- Place of birth: Obala, Cameroon
- Height: 1.84 m (6 ft 0 in)
- Position: Striker

Senior career*
Years	Team	Apps	(Gls)
2007–2009	Delta Tulcea	41	(9)
2009–2010	Oțelul Galați	3	(0)
2009	→ Oțelul II Galați	4	(0)
2010	→ Târgu Mureş (loan)	7	(0)
2011–2013	Râmnicu Vâlcea	29	(6)
2013	Alro Slatina	8	(0)
2014	Râmnicu Vâlcea	29	(2)
Total		121	(17)
- * Club domestic league appearances and goals as of 22 March 2018

Jean Christian Njoh N'Kongue (born 7 March 1983, in Obala) is a Cameroonian retired footballer who played as a striker.

== Career ==
He signed for Oțelul Galați in June 2009, and after a few opportunities during the first half of the season that failed to impress the manager, he was loaned out at FCM Târgu Mureş. He returned to Oţelul in late May 2010, but agreed for a mutual departure in June 2010.
