= Miloš Buchta =

Czech footballer

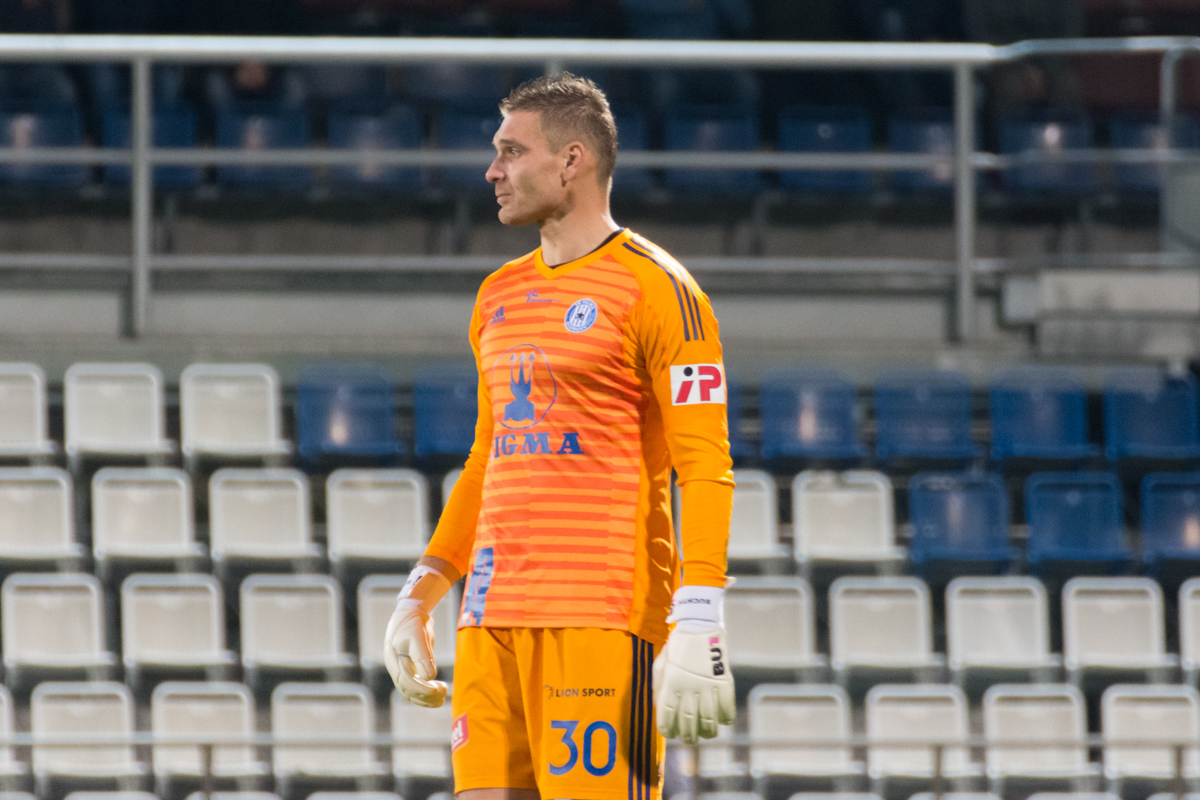

Personal information
- Date of birth: 19 July 1980 (age 46)
- Place of birth: Svitavy, Czechoslovakia
- Height: 1.97 m (6 ft 5 1/2 in)
- Position: Goalkeeper

Team information
- Current team: 1. FC Tatran Prešov
- Number: 30

Youth career
- TJ Svitavy

Senior career*
| Years | Team | Apps | (Gls) |
- PSJ Jihlava
- Dukla Hranice (vojen.)
| 2000–2002 | Sigma Olomouc | | |
| 2001 | → LeRK Prostějov (loan) | 8 | (0) |
| 2002–2003 | SK Hranice | | |
| 2003–2006 | AS Trenčín | 35 | (0) |
| 2006 | → Tatran Prešov (loan) | 12 | (0) |
| 2006–2009 | Tatran Prešov | 66 | (0) |
| 2009–2014 | Gaz Metan Mediaş | 58 | (0) |
| 2011 | → Oțelul Galați (loan) | 0 | (0) |
| 2015 | Rapid București | 16 | (0) |
| 2015–2020 | Sigma Olomouc | 22 | (0) |
| 2020– | Záhradné | | |
| 2021– | → Tatran Prešov (loan) | 1 | (0) |
- * Club domestic league appearances and goals as of 31 July 2021

Miloš Buchta (born 19 July 1980) is a Czech footballer who plays for 1. FC Tatran Prešov. Previously he played for Sigma Olomouc.
