= Zdenko Baotić =

Bosnian footballer

Personal information
- Full name: Zdenko Baotić
- Date of birth: 9 March 1985 (age 41)
- Place of birth: Gradačac, SFR Yugoslavia
- Height: 1.92 m (6 ft 3 1/2 in)
- Position: Goalkeeper

Senior career*
Years	Team	Apps	(Gls)
2001–2006	Orašje	37+	(0+)
2006–2008	Željezničar	24	(0)
2009	Sturm Graz	0	(0)
2009–2010	Oțelul Galați	6	(0)

International career
2004–2006	Bosnia and Herzegovina U21	11	(0)
- * Club domestic league appearances and goals as of 18 April 2009

Zdenko Baotić (born March 9, 1985) is a Bosnian retired football goalkeeper.

== Club career ==
Baotić's first club was HNK Orašje, but after several seasons with the Swans (as they are also known), he decided to go on and play for some bigger club. He signed a four-year-contract with FK Željezničar playing in Bosnian Premier League. In January 2009, he signed with Sturm Graz.

After good performances at SK Sturm Graz, on June 23, 2009, he signed a 4-year deal with the Romanian club Oțelul Galați.

== International career ==
In autumn of 2007, he was called up by Bosnian national team head coach Fuad Muzurović.
