= Marian Tănasă =

Romanian footballer

Personal information
- Date of birth: 14 August 1985 (age 41)
- Place of birth: Bacău, Romania
- Height: 1.89 m (6 ft 2 in)
- Position: Forward

Youth career
- FCM Bacău

Senior career*
| Years | Team | Apps | (Gls) |
| 2003–2008 | FCM Bacău | 116 | (16) |
| 2008–2009 | Oțelul Galați | 15 | (3) |
| 2010 | Baia Mare | 5 | (3) |
| 2010 | Aluminium Hormozgan | 4 | (1) |
| 2011 | CSMS Iași | 8 | (0) |
| 2011 | Unirea Alba Iulia | 7 | (1) |
| 2012–2013 | FCMU Baia Mare | 34 | (8) |
| 2013–2014 | Botoșani | 4 | (0) |
| 2014–2015 | Aerostar Bacău | | |
| 2015–2016 | Gauss Răcăciuni | | |
| Total | | 193 | (32) |

Managerial career
- 2014: Aerostar Bacău
- 2016–2017: Pisicile Roșii Bacău
- 2017–: Star Bacău (youth)
- * Club domestic league appearances and goals as of 27 November 2019

Marian Tănasă (born 14 August 1985) is a former Romanian footballer who played as a forward for various teams that include but are not limited to FCM Bacău, Oțelul Galați or FCMU Baia Mare. In 2014, when he was still an active player, Tănasă for a short period was the manager of Liga III side Aerostar Bacău. After retirement, Tănasă was the coach of women's football club Pisicile Roșii Bacău. Since 2017, he has assumed the position as manager of youth academy Star Bacău.

== Honours ==
Gauss Răcăciuni

- Liga IV – Bacău County: 2015–16
