= Sergiu Costea =

Romanian former football player

Personal information
- Full name: Sergiu Vasile Costea
- Date of birth: 10 January 1983 (age 43)
- Place of birth: Cluj-Napoca, Romania
- Height: 1.78 m (5 ft 10 in)
- Position: Midfielder

Youth career
- Universitatea Cluj

Senior career*
Years	Team	Apps	(Gls)
1999–2004	Universitatea Cluj	49	(7)
2004–2006	Dinamo II București	28	(2)
2006–2007	Gloria Bistriţa	27	(5)
2008	Universitatea Cluj	3	(0)
2008–2012	Unirea Alba Iulia	66	(4)
2010	→ Săgeata Stejaru (loan)	10	(2)
2011	→ Arieșul Turda (loan)	1	(0)
Total		184	(20)
- * Club domestic league appearances and goals as of 27 February 2018

Sergiu Vasile Costea (born 10 January 1983) is a Romanian former football player.
