= Alexandru Avram =

Romanian footballer

Personal information
- Full name: Alexandru Viorel Avram
- Date of birth: 25 April 1991 (age 35)
- Place of birth: Galaţi, Romania
- Height: 1.91 m (6 ft 3 in)
- Positions: Midfielder; forward

Youth career
- LPS Galați

Senior career*
Years	Team	Apps	(Gls)
2007–2012	Oțelul Galați	4	(0)
2009	→ Petrolul Ploieşti (loan)	5	(0)
2011	→ Delta Tulcea (loan)	0	(0)
2011–2012	→ Dunărea Galaţi (loan)	12	(1)
2015–2016	Oțelul Galați	5	(2)
2016–2017	Brașov	0	(0)
2016	→ AFC Hărman (loan)	?	(?)
2017	→ Dunărea Călărași (loan)	8	(2)
2018	Dunărea Călărași	0	(0)
2018	SR Brașov	7	(3)
2018–2019	FC U Craiova	4	(0)
2019	Oțelul Galați	1	(0)
- * Club domestic league appearances and goals as of 2 June 2019

Alexandru Viorel Avram (born 25 April 1991) is a Romanian footballer who plays as a midfielder or forward.

== Club career ==
Avram's loan deal in 2009 with Petrolul was terminated early due to failure to attend training without providing a reason. In 2015, he joined Otelul Galați after a three year break from football which saw him work in Italy.

== Honours ==
Dunărea Călărași

- Liga II: 2017–18
