= FCM Bacău =

Romanian football club

- Full name: Asociația Sportivă a Suporterilor; FCM 1950 Bacău
- Nicknames: Băcăuanii (The People from Bacău County); Taurii furioși (The Mad Bulls); Galben-albaștrii (The Yellow and Blues)
- Short name: Bacău
- Founded: 1950
- Dissolved: 2020
Home colours	Away colours

Asociația Sportivă a Suporterilor FCM 1950 Bacău (also known as ASS FCM 1950 Bacău, FCM 1950 Bacău or FCM Bacău) was a Romanian football club based in Bacău, Bacău County, Moldavia. Founded in 1950 as Dinamo Bacău, the club spent 42 seasons in the top-flight of the Romanian football, winning a Romanian League Cup and qualifying for European competitions such as the Cup Winners' Cup and the Intertoto Cup.

In the early 2010s, the club entered in a shadowy cone due to the conflict between the team's owner, Dumitru Sechelariu (former mayor of Bacău) and the newly elected mayor, who chose to retire the public financing of the team and to sustain SC Bacău. Health problems, and subsequently, the premature death of Dumitru Sechelariu in early 2013, multiplied the existing financial problems of the club. This caused FCM Bacău to withdraw from the beginning of the 2013–14 Liga III season, before dissolving later on.

In 2017, the Supporters Association of FCM Bacău, supported by Sergiu Sechelariu, brother of Dumitru and legal owner of the "FCM 1950 Bacău brand", started a collaboration with Gauss Bacău (former SC Bacău) team also left in the meantime without financing by the municipality, but the collaboration broken in the summer of 2018 and after a year of inactivity, the fans (supported again by Sechelariu's brother) started a new project named ASS FCM 1950 Bacău and enrolled the senior squad in the Liga IV.

== History ==
=== Early years (1950–1992) ===
FCM Bacău was founded in 1950 as Dinamo Bacău under the Ministry of Internal Affairs with other clubs which bore the name "Dinamo". Its management decided to separate from the ministry, renaming it Sport Club Bacău and adding athletics and tennis.

Dinamo Bacău went undefeated in the 1952 season of the Bacău Regional Championship, finishing 1st, 11 points ahead of the 2nd-placed team, and passed Știința Câmpulung Moldovenesc, Locomotiva Galați, and Metalul Brăila in successive rounds of the promotion play-offs for Divizia B. The team also reached the Round of 16 in the Cupa României, eliminating Divizia B sides Locomotiva Iași and Metalul București before losing 2–6 to CCA București. The squad, coached by M. Popescu, included Anghel, Magheț, Weber, Guran, Birăescu, Olaru, Dinu, Oprea, Coidum, Chiriță, Marinescu, Zimba, and Haimovici.

In Divizia B, Dinamo Bacău finished 4th in Series I during the 1953 season before moving to Series II, where they were runners-up in 1954 and won the series in 1955, earning promotion to the top division under coach Florian Ambru. The squad comprised Varga, Miu, Weber, Chiriță, Matei, Cimaru, Ivanenko, Ioanovici, Csatary, Oaidă, Sîrbu, Lemnăru, Crețea, Șoimu, Stancu, and David. In the 1956 season of Divizia A, the club finished last and was relegated to the second division.

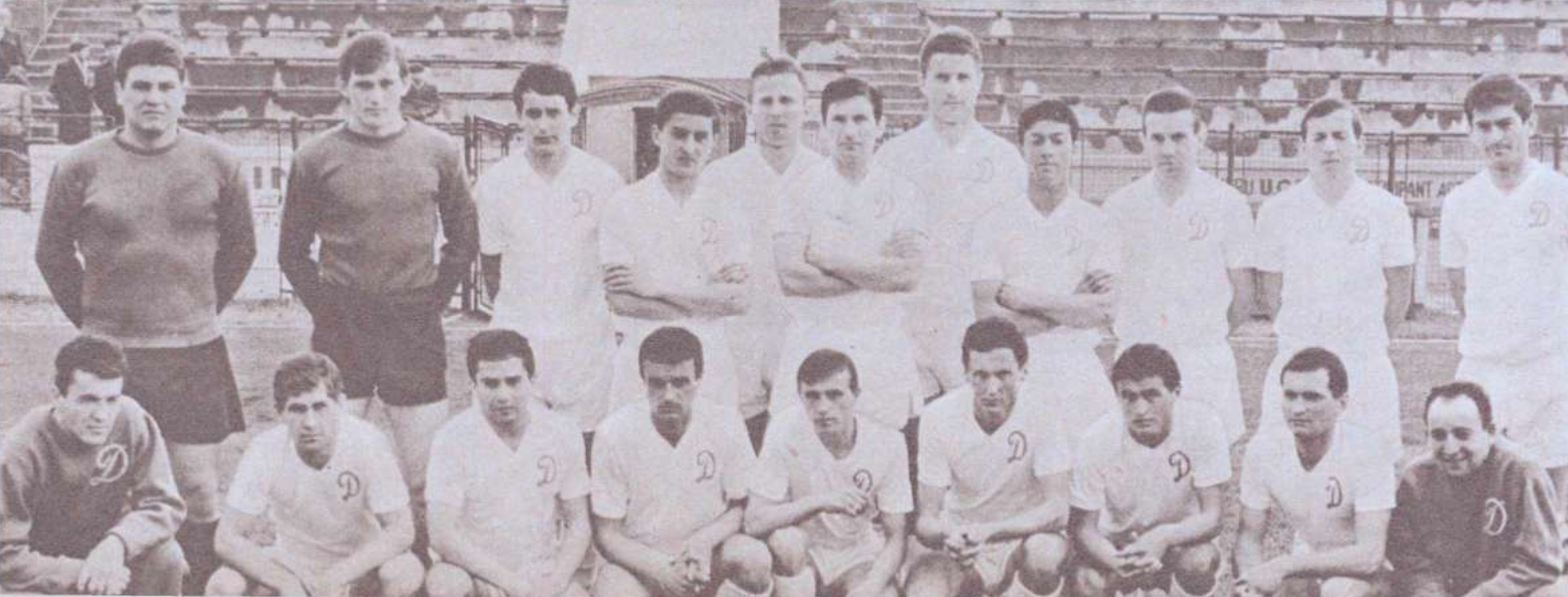
The club played under the name Dinamo Bacău from 1950 until 1970

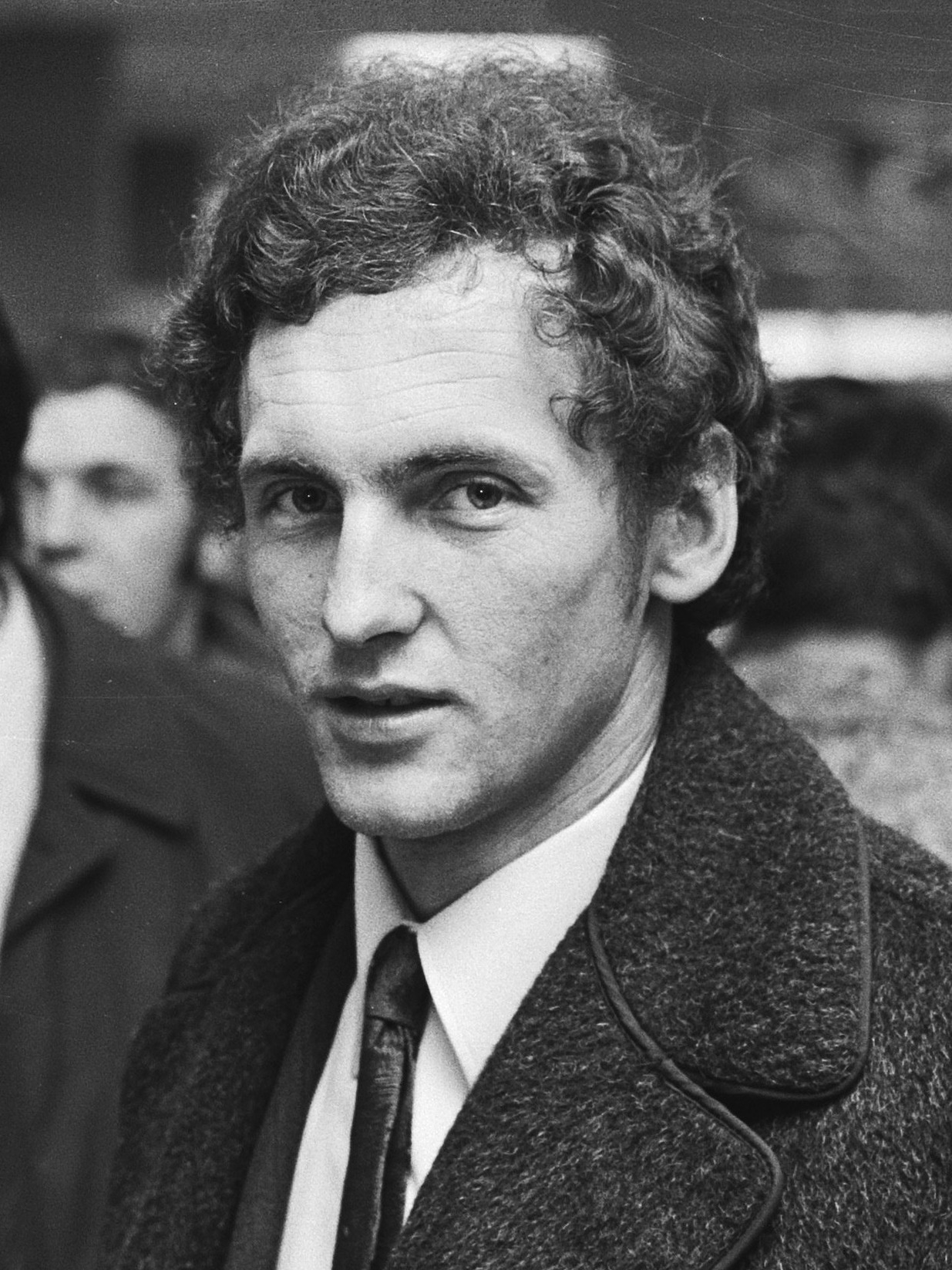
Former Bacău player Emerich Dembrovschi

Returning to Divizia A, Dinamo Bacău finished 6th in the 1967–68 season and 5th in 1968–69 under the leadership of Nicolae Dumitru, earning qualification for the European Inter-Cities Fairs Cup.

In the European campaign Dinamo Bacău, coached by Valeriu Neagu, advanced to the Second Round, eliminating Maltese side Floriana (6–0 at home and 1–0 away), then overcame Norwegian Skeid after a 0–0 draw at Ullevaal Stadion and a 2–0 victory at the 23 August Stadium, and defeated Scottish club Kilmarnock in the Third Round with a 1–1 draw at Rugby Park and a 2–0 home win. In the quarter-finals, they faced English side Arsenal, losing decisively 0–2 at home and 1–7 at Highbury Stadium. Domestically, Dinamo ranked 9th in Divizia A in 1969–70 and reached the Round of 16 in Cupa României, losing 0–2 to Petrolul Ploiești. The squad for that season included Aristide Ghiță, Constantin Fugaciu, Vasile Panait, Alexandru Comănescu, Mircea Nedelcu, Laurențiu Velicu, Madocsa Kiss, Constantin Duțan, Nicolae Vătafu, Mircea Pană, Emerich Dembrovschi, Daniel Ene, Petre Băluță, Francisc Neumayer, and Constantin David.

Sport Club Bacău, as the club was known from 1970, continued to perform solidly in the domestic league, finishing 10th in 1970–71 and reaching the Round of 16 in Cupa României, where they lost to second-division side Progresul Brăila. The following season saw them finish 6th, again exiting the Cup in the Round of 16 after a 0–1 defeat to Jiul Petroșani. In the 1972–73 campaign, the club achieved its best league result, 4th place, and reached the quarter-finals of Cupa României, losing on penalties to Constructorul Galați. However, the next season brought an unexpected setback, as the team was relegated at the end of 1973–74 after finishing 17th, while also losing in the Round of 16 of Cupa României 1–3 to Steaua București. The squad for that match comprised Voinea, Margasoiu, Catargiu, Velicu, Volmer, Hrițcu (Sinăuceanu 66'), Florea, Pană, Dembrovschi, Munteanu (Pruteanu 66'), and Băluțiu.

Băcăuanii managed to bounce back the following year, winning Series I of Divizia B in the 1974–75 campaign under the guidance of Mircea Nedelcu and Nicolae Vătafu in the first part of the season, and Gheorghe Constantin in the second. The promotion-winning squad included Coman, Ursache, Pruteanu, Catargiu, Cărpuci, Lunca, Margasoiu, Sinăuceanu, Botez, Sosu, Florea, Hrițcu, Pană, Volmer, Popa, Duțan, Băluță, Chitaru, and Ilie.

Sport Club reached the final of the Cupa României in the 1990–91 season following the Romanian Revolution, where they lost 2–1 to Universitatea Craiova. As Universitatea Craiova also won Divizia A that season, Sport Club qualified for the UEFA Cup for the second and final time. FC Bacău was drawn to face Werder Bremen in the competition.

=== Sechelariu era (1992–2014) ===
Name	Years
Dinamo Bacău	1950–1970
SC Bacău	1970–1990
FC Bacău	1990–1992
Selena Bacău	1992–1995
AS Bacău	1995–1997
FCM Bacău	1997–2014
Inactive	2014–2019
FCM Bacău	2019–2020

From 1992 to 2006, the team remained in Divizia A as Selena, AS and FCM; Dumitru Sechelariu was its owner. It was a period of relative growth; the team finished 11th in 1995–96 (when they won 5–1 at Steaua Stadium), fifth in 1996–97, 10th in 1997–98, fifth in 1998–99, and eighth in 1999–2000. They were relegated in the summer of 2001 after a relegation play-off against Farul Constanța. The 2001–02 season began with high hopes, great investments and a 4–2 win against Dinamo București before a sixth place. After 2002, FCM Bacău was in the lower part of the tables and was relegated to Liga II at the end of the 2005–06 season. Sechelariu referred to FCM Bacău as "my child", "dear", but also "disabled".

At the end of the 2006–07 season, the team finished in fifth place; in the following season, they were one step away from relegation to the third tier. For the 2009–10 season, the team focused on promotion to Liga I; due to financial problems and misunderstandings between Dumitru Sechelariu and the municipal council, FCM was relegated to Liga III after forfeiting two matches.

The municipality of Bacău registered the team for the following season in Liga III as SCM Bacău. On 9 June 2010, it was announced that a new club would be developed by the municipality; Sechelariu became a minority shareholder. The new management of the yellow-and-blues decided to change their name to SC FCM Bacău SA and terminate the contracts of former AS FCM Bacău players. FCM Bacău was promoted to Liga II in 2011, finishing seventh the following season. Before the next season, the players left the club for financial reasons (most for FC Botoșani) and Sechelariu transferred the club entirely to the municipality. With the team facing relegation to the third league, the municipality decided to stop investing in the club and re-direct public financing to CS Mesagerul Bacău (which would be renamed SC Bacău). After Sechelariu's declining health and death in early 2013, the club withdrew from the league at the start of the season and was dissolved.

=== Supporters, the last hope (2017–2020) ===
The Supporters Association of FCM Bacău, supported by Sergiu Sechelariu (Dumitru's brother and owner of the FCM 1950 Bacău brand), began a collaboration with Gauss Bacău (the former SC Bacău) in 2017. The collaboration broke down during the summer of 2018; after a year of inactivity, fans (supported again by Sergiu Sechelariu) began the ASS FCM 1950 Bacău. They enrolled the senior squad in Liga IV, but the team was again dissolved at the end of the 2019–20 season.

== Grounds ==
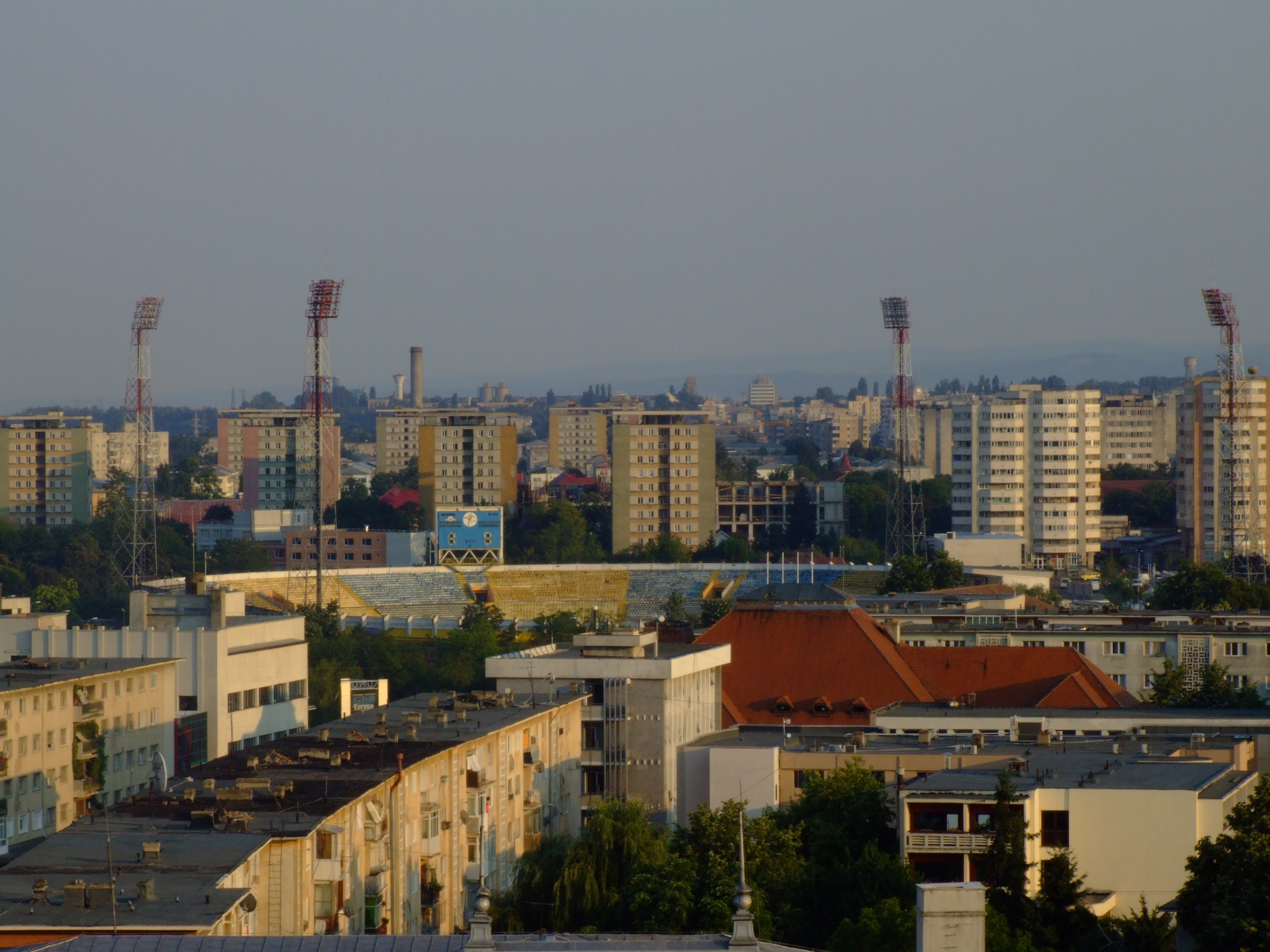
Stadionul Municipal

Until 1966 FCM Bacău (named Dinamo Bacău) used to play its home matches on Steaua Roșie Stadium, with a capacity of 5,000 people, but moved subsequently on the Municipal Stadium in Bacău, with a capacity of 17,500 seats. Seen as a coquettish stadium of the country, especially during Sechelariu's era, when the owner of the team Dumitru Sechelariu renovated and modernized it and assured the installation of a floodlight system. Between 2001 and 2004, the stadium was named as Dumitru Sechelariu, after the name of the eccentric businessman, mayor of Bacău and owner of FCM. The death of Sechelariu meant the death of football from Bacău, after FCM, the stadium was also abandoned, being the victim of an unsuccessful modernization project. The stadium which is situated in the center of the city and was only some time ago the home of FCM is now a ruin.

After the re-foundation as ASS FCM Bacău, the club has to play its home matches on Baza Sportivă Nautică Șerbănești, with a capacity of only 200 people.

== Support ==
FCM Bacău has many supporters in Bacău and especially in Bacău County. The ultras groups of FCM Bacău are known as Taurii furioși, Best and Ultra Boys. The three groups merged in 2010 and form FCM 1950 Bacău, group that developed subsequently in an association that managed to bring back to life the club from the city of George Bacovia. In the past were also another ultras groups such as RSB, Prima-Linie or FRT Bacău.

FCM Bacău fans have an intense rivalry with the supporters of Ceahlăul Piatra Neamț, which are known under the name of Urșii carpatini.

=== Rivalries ===
The most important rivalry for FCM Bacău is the one against Ceahlăul Piatra Neamț. This match is known as the Derby of Moldavia or Il Classico. Over time, FCM had important rivalries with other teams, such as Steaua București, Dinamo București or Rapid București, as well as some regional ones and even local, for example against SC Bacău.

== Honours ==
Chart of Bacău's yearly table positions in the national leagues

=== Leagues ===
Liga II

- Winners (4): 1955, 1966–67, 1974–75, 1994–95
- Runners-up (3): 1954, 1957–58, 1964–65

Liga III

- Winners (1): 2010–11

Liga IV – Bacău County

- Runners-up (1): 2019–20

=== Cups ===
Cupa României

- Runners-up (1): 1990–91

Cupa Ligii:

- Winners (1): 1998

== European record ==
Competition	S	P	W	D	L	GF	GA	GD
UEFA Cup Winners' Cup / European Cup Winners' Cup	1	2	0	0	2	0	11	– 11
UEFA Intertoto Cup	1	2	0	0	2	0	2	– 2
Total	2	4	0	0	4	0	13	– 13

== League and Cup history ==
Season	Tier	Division	Place	Cupa României
2019–20	4	Liga IV (BC)		
2013–14	3	Liga III (Seria I)	12th (R)	
2012–13	2	Liga II (Seria I)	14th (R)	
2011–12	2	Liga II (Seria I)	7th	Round of 32
2010–11	3	Liga III (Seria I)	1st (C, P)	
2009–10	2	Liga II (Seria I)	12th (R)	Round of 32
2008–09	2	Liga II (Seria I)	6th	Round of 32
2007–08	2	Liga II (Seria I)	14th	Round of 32
2006–07	2	Liga II (Seria I)	5th	Round of 32
2005–06	1	Divizia A	16th (R)	Round of 16
2004–05	1	Divizia A	12th	Round of 16
2003–04	1	Divizia A	13th	Round of 32
2002–03	1	Divizia A	12th	Quarter-finals

Season	Tier	Division	Place	Cupa României
2001–02	1	Divizia A	6th	Round of 16
2000–01	1	Divizia A	14th	Round of 16
1999–00	1	Divizia A	7th	Quarter-finals
1998–99	1	Divizia A	5th	Semi-finals
1997–98	1	Divizia A	10th	Quarter-finals
1996–97	1	Divizia A	5th	Round of 32
1995–96	1	Divizia A	11th	Round of 32
1994–95	2	Divizia B (Seria I)	1st (C, P)	
1993–94	2	Divizia B (Seria I)	7th	Quarter-finals
1992–93	1	Divizia A	17th (R)	Round of 16
1991–92	1	Divizia A	14th	Round of 32
1990–91	1	Divizia A	15th	Final
1989–90	1	Divizia A	15th	Round of 32

== Records and statistics ==
=== Biggest victories and defeats ===
As of 24 November 2019'

- Biggest Home Win:
  - 6–0 vs. Universitatea Craiova, 7 December 1988
- Biggest Home Loss:
  - 0–8 vs. Steaua București, 6 May 1956
- Biggest Away Win:
  - 4–0 vs. Bihor Oradea, 18 October 1969
  - 5–1 vs. Steaua București, 17 August 1996
- Biggest Away Loss:
  - 0–8 vs. Steaua București, 30 November 1969
- Highest Scoring:
  - 6–4 vs. Sportul Studențesc București, 27 November 1988
  - 3–7 vs. Dinamo București, 19 September 2003
- Highest Scoring Draw:
  - 4–4 vs. Steaua București, 20 October 1979
- Most Goals Scoring While Losing:
  - 3–4 vs. Progresul București, 9 June 1963
  - 3–4 vs. Universitatea Craiova, 11 November 1973
  - 3–4 vs. Jiul Petroșani, 18 September 1982
  - 3–4 vs. Argeș Pitești, 30 March 1986
  - 3–5 vs. Sportul Studențesc București, 25 June 1987
  - 3–5 vs. Victoria București, 9 October 1988
  - 3–5 vs. Bihor Oradea, 17 September 1989
  - 3–4 vs. Steaua București, 7 August 2000
  - 3–7 vs. Dinamo București, 19 September 2003

=== Longest Streaks ===
As of 24 November 2019'

==== Wins and Losses ====
- Longest Winning Streak (5):
  - From Round 19 of 1962–63 to Round 23 of 1962–63
- Longest Unbeaten Streak (14):
  - From Round 34 of 1997–98 to Round 13 of 1998–99
- Longest Drawing Streak (8):
  - From Round 7 of 1979–80 to Round 14 of 1979–80
- Longest Not Drawing Streak (39):
  - From Round 33 of 1992–93 to Round 3 of 1996–97
- Longest Winless Streak (15):
  - From Round 16 of 2005–06 to Round 30 of 2005–06
- Longest Losing Streak (13):
  - From Round 17 of 2005–06 to Round 29 of 2005–06
- Longest Home Winning Streak (13):
  - From Round 3 of 1968–69 to Round 28 of 1968–69
- Longest Home Unbeaten Streak (43):
  - From Round 20 of 1967–68 to Round 18 of 1970–71
- Longest Home Drawing Streak (4):
  - From Round 7 of 1979–80 to Round 14 of 1979–80
- Longest Home Not Drawing Streak (19):
  - From Round 34 of 1992–93 to Round 2 of 1996–97
- Longest Home Winless Streak (7):
  - From Round 16 of 2005–06 to Round 29 of 2005–06
- Longest Home Losing Streak (6):
  - From Round 18 of 2005–06 to Round 29 of 2005–06
- Longest Away Winning Streak (3):
  - From Round 20 of 1962–63 to Round 25 of 1962–63
- Longest Away Unbeaten Streak (6):
  - From Round 1 of 1998–99 to Round 12 of 1998–99
- Longest Away Drawing Streak (4):
  - From Round 8 of 1979–80 to Round 13 of 1979–80
- Longest Away Not Drawing Streak (29):
  - From Round 20 of 1961–62 to Round 21 of 1967–68
- Longest Away Winless Streak (45):
  - From Round 2 of 2003–04 to Round 30 of 2005–06
- Longest Away Losing Streak (14):
  - From Round 27 of 1969–70 to Round 22 of 1970–71

==== Scoring and Conceding ====
- Longest Scoring Streak (10):
  - From Round 16 of 1960–61 to Round 25 of 1960–61
  - From Round 33 of 1981–82 to Round 8 of 1982–83
  - From Round 31 of 1997–98 to Round 6 of 1998–99
- Longest Clean Sheets Streak (5):
  - From Round 9 of 2002–03 to Round 13 of 2002–03
- Longest Scoreless Streak (6):
  - From Round 9 of 1997–98 to Round 14 of 1997–98
- Longest Conceding Streak (25):
  - From Round 5 of 2005–06 to Round 29 of 2005–06
- Longest Home Scoring Streak (26):
  - From Round 23 of 1995–96 to Round 3 of 1997–98
- Longest Home Clean Sheets Streak (9):
  - From Round 26 of 1969–70 to Round 14 of 1970–71
  - From Round 18 of 1984–85 to Round 33 of 1984–85
- Longest Home Scoreless Streak (4):
  - From Round 19 of 2003–04 to Round 25 of 2003–04
- Longest Home Conceding Streak (13):
  - From Round 6 of 2005–06 to Round 29 of 2005–06
- Longest Away Scoring Streak (7):
  - From Round 26 of 1997–98 to Round 5 of 1998–99
- Longest Away Clean Sheets Streak (3):
  - From Round 15 of 1960–61 to Round 18 of 1960–61
  - From Round 24 of 1968–69 to Round 27 of 1968–69
  - From Round 28 of 2002–03 to Round 2 of 2003–04
- Longest Away Scoreless Streak (9):
  - From Round 28 of 1991–92 to Round 9 of 1992–93
- Longest Away Conceding Streak (31):
  - From Round 22 of 1983–84 to Round 15 of 1985–86

== Notable former players ==
The footballers enlisted below have had international cap(s) for their respective countries at junior and/or senior level and/or more than 100 caps for FCM Bacău.

Romania

- (Romania) Vasile Alexandru
- (Romania) Florian Ambru
- (Romania) Ștefan Apostol
- (Romania) Vasile Ardeleanu
- (Romania) Sorin Avram
- (Romania) Eugen Baciu
- (Romania) Dragu Bădin
- (Romania) Valentin Bădoi
- (Romania) Daniel Bogdan
- (Romania) Radu Ciobanu
- (Romania) Cristian Ciocoiu
- (Romania) Corneliu Codreanu
- (Romania) Narcis Coman
- (Romania) Mircea Constantinescu
- (Romania) Andrei Cristea
- (Romania) Marius Croitoru
- (Romania) Cătălin Cursaru
- (Romania) Daniel David
- (Romania) Emerich Dembrovschi
- (Romania) Marius Doboș
- (Romania) Gheorghe Ene
- (Romania) Florin Ganea
- (Romania) Dudu Georgescu
- (Romania) Dorin Goian
- (Romania) Viorel Ignătescu
- (Romania) Silviu Iorgulescu
- (Romania) Vasile Jercălău
- (Romania) Ionuț Mihălăchioaie
- (Romania) Lică Movilă
- (Romania) Vlad Munteanu
- (Romania) Lică Nunweiller
- (Romania) Nicolae Oaidă
- (Romania) Florin Petcu
- (Romania) Cornel Popa
- (Romania) Cristian Popovici
- (Romania) Florin Prunea
- (Romania) Narcis Răducan
- (Romania) Răzvan Raț
- (Romania) Vasile Simionaș
- (Romania) Vasile Șoiman
- (Romania) Costel Solomon
- (Romania) Marian Tănasă
- (Romania) Ion Țîrcovnicu
- (Romania) Sorin Trofin

Moldova

- (Moldova) Alexei Scala
- (Moldova) Iurie Scala

== Notable former managers ==
- (Romania) Nicolae Dumitru (1967–1969)
- (Romania) Valeriu Neagu (1969–1970)
- (Romania) Gheorghe Constantin (1975–1976)
- (Romania) Angelo Niculescu (1980–1981)
- (Romania) Cristian Popovici (2004–2007)
- (Romania) Cristian Popovici (2008)
- (Romania) Cristian Popovici (2012)
- (Romania) Florian Ambru
- (Romania) Florin Halagian
- (Romania) Traian Ionescu
- (Romania) Mircea Nedelcu
- (Romania) Grigore Sichitiu
- (Romania) Constantin Teașcă
- (Romania) Costel Orac
- (Romania) Gheorghe Poenaru
- (Romania) Constantin Rădulescu
- (Romania) Andrei Sepci
- (Romania) Nicolae Vătafu
