= Andrei Schwartz =

Romanian footballer

Personal information
- Date of birth: 5 July 1989 (age 37)
- Place of birth: Galaţi, Romania
- Position: Midfielder

Youth career
- Oțelul Galați

Senior career*
Years	Team	Apps	(Gls)
2007–2011	Oțelul Galați	1	(0)
2007–2009	→ Oțelul II Galați	?	(?)
2009–2010	→ Râmnicu Sărat (loan)	27	(0)
2010	→ Oțelul II Galați	?	(?)
2011	→ SC Bacău (loan)	?	(?)
2011–2012	SC Bacău	?	(?)
Total		28+	(0)
- * Club domestic league appearances and goals as of 22 March 2018

Andrei Schwartz (born 5 July 1989) is a Romanian former footballer who played as a midfielder. Schwartz made his Liga I debut on 5 May 2009 for Oțelul Galați, in a 0–1 defeat against Dinamo București. Schwartz career was not a very long one and he played for teams mainly for Liga II and Liga III such as: Oțelul's reserves team, Oțelul II Galați, Râmnicu Sărat or SC Bacău.
