= Marian Cârjă =

Romanian footballer

Personal information
- Date of birth: 3 May 1987 (age 39)
- Place of birth: Galați, Romania
- Height: 1.79 m (5 ft 10 in)
- Position: Right back

Youth career
- Oțelul Galați

Senior career*
Years	Team	Apps	(Gls)
2006–2013	Oțelul Galați	34	(0)
2008	→ FC Ploieşti (loan)		
2010–2011	→ Petrolul Ploieşti (loan)	20	(1)
2011–2012	→ Delta Tulcea (loan)	18	(1)
2013–2014	Universitatea Craiova	20	(1)
2014–2015	Săgeata Năvodari	11	(0)
2015–2017	Metalosport Galați		
- * Club domestic league appearances and goals as of 18 September 2016

Marian Cârjă (born 3 May 1987) is a Romanian footballer.
