= Valentin Ioviță =

Romanian footballer (1984–2024)

Personal information
- Date of birth: 23 January 1984
- Place of birth: Galați, Romania
- Date of death: 4 August 2024 (aged 40)
- Height: 1.74 m (5 ft 9 in)
- Position: Left midfielder

Youth career
- 1995–2000: Salbero
- 2000–2001: VfL Bochum

Senior career*
Years	Team	Apps	(Gls)
2001–2002	Gloria Buzău		
2002–2004	Sportul Studențesc București	13	(0)
2004–2006	Dunărea Galați	35	(2)
2006–2008	Gloria Buzău	56	(7)
2008–2009	Oțelul Galați	4	(0)
2009–2010	Dunărea Galați	20	(0)
2010	CF Brăila	2	(0)
Total		130	(9)
- * Club domestic league appearances and goals

Valentin Ioviță (23 January 1984 – 4 August 2024) was a Romanian footballer who played as a left midfielder. He spent his entire career playing in Romania, having a total of 40 Liga I appearances with four goals scored and 90 Liga II appearances with five goals scored.

Ioviță died on 4 August 2024, at the age of 40, after suffering a stroke.
