= 1998 Cupa Ligii =

Cupa Ligii
Tournament details
- Country: Romania
- Dates: 28.05.1998

Final positions
- Champions: FCM Bacău
- Runners-up: U Cluj

The Cupa Ligii 1998 was the first season of the Cupa Ligii. The final took place at ANEFS Stadium in Bucharest.

== Round 1 ==
Grupa Vest
10.05.1998

Jiul Petroșani	1–3	Gloria Bistrița
Irina ’27		Crîngurean ‘8, Antal ’76, Dăncuș ’78

10.05.1998

CSM Resita	2–3	U Cluj
Ciucur ’66, Păuna ’88		Dianu ’39, Coroian ’72, ’89-pen

Grupa Est
10.05.1998

Foresta	2–0	Ceahlăul Piatra Neamț
D.Ene ’33, Ghinea ’88

10.05.1998

Otelul Galati	2–3	FCM Bacau
Guriță ‘4, Mihalache ’13-pen		C.Pană ‘2, Fl.Petcu ’31, Axinte ’85

Grupa Sud
10.05.1998

FC Dinamo București	3–0	FC Sportul Studențesc București
I.Serban ’24, A.Savu ’55 ’88

10.05.1998

AS Progresul București	5–3	FC Rapid București
Albeanu ’30 –pen, Caramarin ’48, ’56-pen, Vasc ’51, Oană ’89		C.Popa ’66, 78, Fl.Cîrstea ’75

10.05.1998

SSC Farul Constanța	0–1	FC Steaua București
		Barcauan ’71

Grupa Sud-Vest
10.05.1998

FC Petrolul Ploiești	3–1	AFC Chindia Târgoviște
Orlando ’25, Ali ’58, Măldărășanu ’79		Prisăceanu ’28

10.05.1998

FC Universitatea Craiova	3–2	FC Argeș Pitești
David ’26 –pen, ’35-pen, Sava ’60		Bîrdeș ’22, Sîrbu ’86

== Final ==
28.05.1998

FCM Bacău	3–2 (a.e.t.)	Universitatea Cluj
Fl.Pavel ‘13, ’95-pen, Ardeleanu ‘47		Salagean ‘75, Trusca ‘78

ANEFS Stadium, Bucharest
Attendance: 1000
Referee: C.Zotta
