= 2014–15 FC Dinamo București season =

FC Dinamo București
2014–15 season
- Manager: Flavius Stoican (until 12 November); Ionel Dănciulescu (15 November-31 December); Mihai Teja (6 January-12 March); Flavius Stoican (12 March-6 May); Mircea Rednic (from 6 May)
- Liga I: 7th
- Cupa României: Round of 16
- Cupa Ligii: Semifinals
- Top goalscorer: League: Kamil Biliński (11 goals); All: Kamil Biliński (14 goals)
Home colours	Away colours	Third colours

The 2014–15 season was FC Dinamo București's 66th consecutive season in Liga I. In this season, Dinamo played in Liga I, Cupa României and Cupa Ligii. Dinamo continued its insolvency procedure, thus the club could not buy any player, bringing only free agents and players on loan.

Flavius Stoican remained the club manager for the first months of the season, but resigned in November. The general director Ionel Dănciulescu was named caretaker manager until the end of the year. In January 2015, Mihai Teja, former manager of the national U-21 squad, signed a contract for 18 months, but was sacked in March, after only five games in charge. Stoican was brought back for the end of the season.

On 6 May, Stoican ended his contract with Dinamo, leaving the club for the second time this season. His place was taken by Mircea Rednic who returned to Dinamo for his third spell as head coach.

== Players ==
=== Squad changes ===
Transfers in:

No.	Pos.	Nat.	Name	Age	EU	Moving from	Type	Transfer window	Ends	Transfer fee	Source
1	GK	(Romania)	Alexandru Marc	31	EU	FC Brașov	Transfer	Summer	2017	Free	dolce-sport.ro
5	MF	(Brazil)	Wanderson	24		Corona Brașov	Transfer	Summer	2017	Free	dolce-sport.ro
77	ST	(Romania)	Bogdan Gavrilă	22	EU	Oțelul Galați	Transfer	Summer	Undisclosed	Free	gsp.ro
6	DF	(Romania)	Andrei Cordoș	26	EU	FC Vaslui	Transfer	Summer	2018	Free	fcdinamo.ro
29	ST	(Romania)	Marius Niculae	33	EU	Şanlıurfaspor (Turkey)	Transfer	Winter	Undisclosed	Free	fcdinamo.ro
99	ST	(Brazil)	Henrique	27		ASA Târgu Mureș	Transfer	Winter	Undisclosed	Free	fcdinamo.ro
5	MF	(Romania)	Nicolae Grigore	31	EU	Apollon Limassol (Cyprus)	Transfer	Winter	2016	Free	fcdinamo.ro
34	GK	(North Macedonia)	Kristijan Naumovski	26		Levski Sofia (Bulgaria)	Transfer	Winter	Undisclosed	Free	fcdinamo.ro
18	MF	(Romania)	Marian Cristescu	29	EU	Astra Giurgiu	Transfer	Winter	2016	Free	fcdinamo.ro
22	DF	(Portugal)	Serginho	29	EU	FC Brașov	Transfer	Winter	2016	Free	fcdinamo.ro
3	DF	(Portugal)	Ricardo Machado	26	EU	FC Brașov	Transfer	Winter	2017	Free	fcdinamo.ro
30	GK	(Benin)	Fabien Farnolle	30	EU	Clermont Foot (France)	Transfer	Winter	2017	Free	fcdinamo.ro
21	DF	(Romania)	Andrei Marc	21	EU	Ceahlăul Piatra Neamț	Transfer	Winter	2019	Free	fcdinamo.ro

Transfers out:

No.	Pos.	Nat.	Name	Age	EU	Moving to	Type	Transfer window	Transfer fee	Source
7	MF	(Romania)	Cătălin Munteanu	35	EU	FC Brașov	Released	Summer		gsp.ro
21	DF	(Romania)	Dragoș Grigore	27	EU	Toulouse FC (France)	Sold	Summer	€ 1M	gsp.ro
23	GK	(North Macedonia)	Kristijan Naumovski	25		Levski Sofia (Bulgaria)	Released	Summer	Free	
26	DF	(Romania)	Laurențiu Rus	29	EU	Astra Giurgiu	Released	Summer		gsp.ro
34	GK	(Romania)	Cristian Bălgrădean	26	EU	CS Universitatea Craiova	Released	Summer	Free	sport.ro
5	DF	(France)	Steven Thicot	27	EU	Belenenses (Portugal)	Released	Summer		digisport.ro
17	MF	(Brazil)	Elton Figueiredo	28		Apollon Limassol (Cyprus)	Released	Winter		prosport.ro
88	DF	(Romania)	Constantin Grecu	26	EU	Pandurii	Released	Winter		sportnews.ro
5	MF	(Brazil)	Wanderson	24		C.F. União (Portugal)	Released	Winter		sportnews.ro
6	DF	(Romania)	Andrei Cordoș	26	EU	Pandurii	Released	Winter		sptfm.ro
30	GK	(Benin)	Fabien Farnolle	30	EU		Mutual agreement	Winter		digisport.ro
20	DF	(Romania)	Ștefan Bărboianu	27	EU		Mutual agreement	Winter		prosport.ro
16	DF	(France)	Alexandre Durimel	25	EU		Mutual agreement	Winter		fcdinamo.ro

Last updated: 2015-05-25

Loans in:

No.	Pos.	Nat.	Name	Age	EU	Moving from	Type	Transfer window	Ends	Transfer fee	Source
4	MF	(Israel)	Hatem Abd Elhamed	23	EU	Ashdod (Israel)	Loan	Winter	2015		fcdinamo.ro
7	MF	(Romania)	Gheorghe Grozav	24	EU	Terek Grozny (Russia)	Loan	Winter	2015		fcdinamo.ro
6	DF	(Bosnia and Herzegovina)	Gordan Bunoza	27		Pescara (Italy)	Loan	Winter	2015		fcdinamo.ro

Loans out:

No.	Pos.	Nat.	Name	Age	EU	Moving to	Type	Transfer window	Transfer fee	Source
99	ST	(Brazil)	Henrique	28		Viitorul Constanța	Loaned out	Winter		digisport.ro

Last updated: 2015-2-15

=== Squad statistics ===
No.	Pos.	Player	League			Romanian Cup			League Cup		
No.	Pos.	Player	Apps	Starts	Goals	Apps	Starts	Goals	Apps	Starts	Goals
1	GK	(Romania) Al.Marc	23	23	0	1	1	0	2	2	0
3	DF	(Portugal) Machado	6	5	0	0	0	0	0	0	0
4	MF	(Israel) Elhamed	13	11	3	0	0	0	2	2	0
5	MF	(Romania) Grigore	12	12	0	0	0	0	1	1	0
6	DF	(Bosnia and Herzegovina) Bunoza	16	16	1	0	0	0	1	1	0
7	MF	(Romania) Grozav	11	8	4	0	0	0	2	1	1
8	MF	(Romania) Rotariu	31	14	1	2	2	3	2	1	0
9	FW	(Poland) Biliński	33	24	11	2	1	2	4	3	1
10	MF	(Romania) Matei	26	24	3	1	0	0	2	2	0
14	DF	(Cameroon) Fai	24	24	0	1	1	0	3	2	0
15	MF	(Romania) Petre	2	0	1	0	0	0	1	0	0
16	FW	(Romania) Trabalka	1	0	0	0	0	0	0	0	0
18	MF	(Romania) Cristescu	14	8	0	0	0	0	1	1	0
19	MF	(Senegal) Boubacar	18	16	1	0	0	0	3	2	1
21	DF	(Romania) An.Marc	11	10	0	0	0	0	1	0	0
22	DF	(Portugal) Serginho	5	5	0	0	0	0	0	0	0
27	DF	(Romania) Nedelcearu	13	12	0	1	1	0	3	3	0
29	FW	(Romania) Niculae	13	7	3	0	0	0	2	2	0
34	GK	(North Macedonia) Naumovski	8	8	0	0	0	0	1	1	0
35	DF	(Romania) Șerban	11	2	0	2	0	0	1	0	0
55	MF	(Romania) Alexe	26	20	6	2	2	0	1	1	0
77	FW	(Romania) Gavrilă	24	4	4	2	1	0	2	0	0
93	MF	(Romania) Lazăr	24	20	3	2	1	0	4	4	1
94	DF	(Romania) Filip	23	20	0	1	1	0	3	3	1
Players retired, sold or loaned out during the season
5	MF	(Brazil) Wanderson	5	3	0	2	2	0	0	0	0
6	DF	(Romania) Cordoș	13	13	2	2	2	0	0	0	0
12	GK	(Romania) Samoilă	3	3	0	1	1	0	0	0	0
16	DF	(France) Durimel	10	9	0	1	1	0	3	3	0
17	MF	(Brazil) Elton	12	12	1	1	1	0	0	0	0
20	DF	(Romania) Bărboianu	26	26	1	2	2	0	3	3	0
22	DF	(Romania) Lemac	1	0	0	1	0	0	2	0	0
24	DF	(Romania) Popa	4	4	0	0	0	0	1	1	0
24	MF	(Romania) Firțulescu	1	0	0	1	1	0	0	0	0
26	FW	(Romania) Văduva	1	0	0	0	0	0	0	0	0
30	GK	(Benin) Farnolle	0	0	0	0	0	0	1	1	0
88	DF	(Romania) Grecu	12	11	0	1	1	0	2	2	0

Statistics accurate as of match played 29 May 2015

=== Disciplinary record ===
Includes all competitive matches.

Last updated on 29 May 2015

No.	Pos	Player	Liga I			Cupa României			Cupa Ligii		
No.	Pos	Player	Yellow card	(yellow card) (yellow-red card)	Red card	Yellow card	(yellow card) (yellow-red card)	Red card	Yellow card	(yellow card) (yellow-red card)	Red card
1	GK	Alexandru Marc	3	0	0	0	0	0	0	0	0
3	DF	Ricardo Machado	1	0	1	0	0	0	0	0	0
4	MF	Hatem Abd Elhamed	4	0	0	0	0	0	0	0	0
5	MF	Nicolae Grigore	3	1	0	0	0	0	1	0	0
6	DF	Gordan Bunoza	2	0	0	0	0	0	0	0	0
7	MF	Gheorghe Grozav	1	0	0	0	0	0	0	0	0
8	MF	Dorin Rotariu	2	0	0	0	0	0	1	0	0
9	FW	Kamil Bilinski	3	0	0	1	0	0	0	0	0
10	MF	Cosmin Matei	4	0	0	1	0	0	0	0	0
14	DF	Collins Fai	6	2	0	1	0	0	0	0	0
18	MF	Marian Cristescu	2	0	0	0	0	0	0	0	0
19	MF	Boubacar Mansaly	5	0	0	0	0	0	0	0	0
21	DF	Andrei Marc	1	0	1	0	0	0	0	0	0
22	DF	Serginho	0	0	0	0	0	0	0	0	0
23	MF	Ionuț Șerban	2	0	0	0	0	0	0	0	0
27	DF	Ionuț Nedelcearu	3	0	1	1	0	0	1	0	0
29	FW	Marius Niculae	4	0	0	0	0	0	1	0	0
34	GK	Kristijan Naumovski	1	0	0	0	0	0	0	0	0
55	FW	Marius Alexe	1	0	0	1	0	0	0	0	0
77	FW	Bogdan Gavrilă	3	0	0	0	0	0	0	0	0
93	MF	Valentin Lazăr	5	0	1	0	0	0	0	0	0
94	MF	Steliano Filip	10	2	0	0	0	0	1	0	0
Players retired, sold or loaned out during the season
5	MF	Wanderson	0	0	0	2	0	0	0	0	0
6	DF	Andrei Cordoș	4	0	0	0	0	0	1	0	0
12	GK	Cătălin Samoilă	1	0	0	0	0	0	0	0	0
16	DF	Alexandre Durimel	1	0	0	0	0	0	0	0	0
17	MF	Elton Figueiredo	1	0	0	0	0	0	0	0	0
20	DF	Ștefan Bărboianu	8	1	0	1	0	0	1	0	0
22	DF	Denis Lemac	0	0	0	0	0	0	0	0	0
24	DF	Adrian Popa	2	0	0	0	0	0	1	0	0
24	MF	Dragoș Firțulescu	0	0	0	0	0	0	0	0	0
26	FW	Robert Văduva	0	0	0	0	0	0	0	0	0
30	GK	Fabien Farnolle	0	0	0	0	0	0	0	0	0
88	DF	Constantin Grecu	3	0	1	0	0	0	1	0	0

== Competitions ==
=== Liga I ===
==== Standings ====
Pos	Team	Pld	W	D	L	GF	GA	GD	Pts	Qualification or relegation
5	Universitatea Craiova (Note: Teams who have not been given a UEFA license (Brașov, Ceahlăul Piatra Neamț, CFR Cluj, Concordia Chiajna, Universitatea Craiova, Dinamo București, Oțelul Galați, Petrolul Ploiești, Rapid București and Universitatea Cluj) were not eligible to play in European competitions. Petrolul Ploiești, Dinamo București, Rapid București, FC Brașov, Universitatea Cluj and CFR Cluj were not eligible to play in Europe because they filed for insolvency and Universitatea Craiova was not eligible because it was affiliated in 2013.) (I)	34	14	11	9	40	34	+6	53	Not granted a license for UEFA Competitions
6	Petrolul Ploiești (I)	34	14	10	10	42	30	+12	52	Not granted a license for UEFA Competitions
7	Dinamo București (I)	34	13	9	12	47	44	+3	48	Not granted a license for UEFA Competitions
8	Botoșani	34	12	11	11	40	43	−3	47	Qualification for the Europa League first qualifying round (Note: The Romanian Cup finalist Universitatea Cluj filed for insolvency, and the other one is Steaua București, so the European spot meant for cup winner will be filled up by the 3rd eligible team from the Liga I and the spot for the third-placed team will be given to the 4th eligible team from the Liga I.)
9	Pandurii Târgu Jiu	34	12	9	13	47	42	+5	45	

Source: Liga I (in Romanian) UEFA.com (in English)
Rules for classification: 1) points; 2) head-to-head results; 3) goal difference; 4) number of goals scored
(I) Unable to qualify for UEFA Competitions

==== Results summary ====
Overall								Home						Away					
Pld	W	D	L	GF	GA	GD	Pts	W	D	L	GF	GA	GD	W	D	L	GF	GA	GD
34	13	9	12	47	44	+3	48	7	6	4	25	19	+6	6	3	8	22	25	−3

Last updated: 29 May 2015.
Source: Competitive Matches

==== Results by round ====
Round	1	2	3	4	5	6	7	8	9	10	11	12	13	14	15	16	17	18	19	20	21	22	23	24	25	26	27	28	29	30	31	32	33	34
Ground	H	A	H	A	A	H	A	H	A	H	A	H	A	H	A	H	A	A	H	A	H	H	A	H	A	H	A	H	A	H	A	H	A	H
Result	W	W	D	D	D	W	L	W	W	D	L	W	L	L	W	D	L	W	W	L	W	L	L	D	L	W	D	D	L	L	W	D	W	L
Position	1	2	3	4	4	4	4	3	3	4	4	3	5	5	5	6	7	6	6	6	5	6	6	6	6	6	7	7	8	8	7	8	7	7

Updated to match(es) played on 29 May 2015. Source: Competitive Matches
A = Away; H = Home; W = Win; D = Draw; L = Loss

=== Competitive ===
==== Liga I ====
Kickoff times are in EET.

28 July Round 1	Dinamo București	4–0	Oțelul Galați	Bucharest
21:00	Elton 24'; Bilinski 28' (pen.), 47', 67'	Report		Stadium: Stadionul Dinamo; Attendance: 7,163; Referee: Sebastian Colțescu

4 August Round 2	Universitatea Cluj	2–3	Dinamo București	Cluj-Napoca
21:00	Ninu 26'; Boutadjine 83'	Report	Matei 9' (pen.); Lazăr 34'; Bilinski 45'	Stadium: Cluj Arena; Attendance: 8,000; Referee: Cristian Balaj

9 August Round 3	Dinamo București	1–1	ASA Târgu Mureș	Bucharest
21:00	Balaur 45' (o.g.)	Report	Mureşan 8'	Stadium: Stadionul Dinamo; Attendance: 6,873; Referee: Lucian Rusandu

17 August Round 4	Ceahlăul Piatra Neamț	1–1	Dinamo București	Piatra Neamț
21:00	Achim 45' (pen.)	Report	Matei 62'	Stadium: Stadionul Ceahlăul; Attendance: 4,000; Referee: Adrian Comănescu

22 August Round 5	Concordia Chiajna	0–0	Dinamo București	Chiajna
21:00		Report	Lazăr (red card) 75'	Stadium: Stadionul Concordia; Attendance: 3,000; Referee: Istvan Kovacs

30 August Round 6	Dinamo București	2–1	FC Brașov	Bucharest
18:30	Cordoș 33'; Matei 63'	Report	Aganović 86'	Stadium: Stadionul Dinamo; Attendance: 5,817; Referee: George Găman

14 September Round 7	FC Botoșani	3–2	Dinamo București	Botoșani
21:00	Fülöp 28'; Ngadeu-Ngadjui 61'; Ngankam 90'	Report	Alexe 41' (pen.); Gavrilă 86'; Fai (red card) 57'; Bărboianu (red card) 74'	Stadium: Stadionul Municipal; Referee: Horațiu Feșnic

20 September Round 8	Dinamo București	1–0	CSMS Iași	Bucharest
21:00	Alexe 75'	Report		Stadium: Stadionul Dinamo; Attendance: 5,000; Referee: Marcel Bîrsan

27 September Round 9	Rapid București	0–3	Dinamo București	Bucharest
21:00		Report	Cordoș 39'; Alexe 83'; Bărboianu 90' (pen.); Nedelcearu (red card) 8'	Stadium: Stadionul Giulești-Valentin Stănescu; Attendance: 4,000; Referee: Alexandru Tudor

5 October Round 10	Dinamo București	1–1	Universitatea Craiova	Bucharest
21:00	Bilinski 52' (pen.)	Report	Filip 25' (o.g.)	Stadium: Stadionul Dinamo; Attendance: 11,000; Referee: Cristian Balaj

18 October Round 11	CFR Cluj	2–1	Dinamo București	Cluj-Napoca
21:00	Chanturia 19' (pen.); Guima 84'	Report	Lazăr 3'	Stadium: Stadionul Dr. Constantin Rădulescu; Attendance: 6,000; Referee: Lucian Rusandu

26 October Round 12	Dinamo București	3–2	Pandurii Târgu Jiu	Bucharest
17:30	Alexe 6'; Rotariu 60'; Biliński 90'; Fai (red card) 90'	Report	Roman 8', 50'; Roman (red card) 90'	Stadium: Stadionul Dinamo; Attendance: 2,273; Referee: Cătălin Popa

31 October Round 13	Steaua București	3–0	Dinamo București	Bucharest
20:30	Szukala 45'; Papp 79'; Keserü 81'	Report		Stadium: Arena Națională; Attendance: 38,154; Referee: Cristian Balaj

7 November Round 14	Dinamo București	2–3	Viitorul Constanța	Bucharest
20:30	Gavrilă 50'; Petre 89'	Report	Mitrea 5' (pen.), 43'; Bonilla 83'	Stadium: Stadionul Dinamo; Attendance: 2,500; Referee: George Găman

21 November Round 15	Gaz Metan Mediaș	1–2	Dinamo București	Mediaș
20:30	Tahar 4'	Report	Boubacar 21'; Bilinski 54'; Grecu (red card) 72'	Stadium: Stadionul Gaz Metan; Attendance: 1,500; Referee: Alexandru Tudor

30 November Round 16	Dinamo București	0–0	Petrolul Ploiești	Bucharest
20:30		Report		Stadium: Stadionul Dinamo; Attendance: 3,136; Referee: Cristian Balaj

6 December Round 17	Astra Giurgiu	6–1	Dinamo București	Giurgiu
20:30	Budescu 16'; Seto 19'; William 29'; Oros 36'; Alibec 69'; Ben Youssef 74'	Report	Bilinski 70'	Stadium: Stadionul Marin Anastasovici; Attendance: 1,900; Referee: Ovidiu Hațegan

21 February Round 18	Oțelul Galați	0–1	Dinamo București	Galați
20:30		Report	Niculae 44'	Stadium: Stadionul Oțelul; Attendance: 8,000; Referee: Robert Dumitru

28 February Round 19	Dinamo București	3–0	Universitatea Cluj	Bucharest
20:30	Bilinski 27', 90'; Lazăr 68'	Report	Bambara (red card) 75'	Stadium: Stadionul Dinamo; Attendance: 5,375; Referee: Marcel Bîrsan

6 March Round 20	ASA Târgu Mureș	2–1	Dinamo București	Târgu Mureș
20:30	Mureşan 65', 73'	Report	Bilinski 43'; Machado (red card) 58'	Stadium: Stadionul Trans-Sil; Attendance: 7,500; Referee: Ovidiu Hațegan

14 March Round 21	Dinamo București	3–1	Ceahlăul Piatra Neamț	Bucharest
20:30	Grozav 18', 51'; Niculae 83'	Report	Marković 17'	Stadium: Stadionul Dinamo; Attendance: 2,147; Referee: Horațiu Feșnic

17 March Round 22	Dinamo București	0–3	Concordia Chiajna	Bucharest
17:30	An.Marc (red card) 39'	Report	Alves 13'; Elhamed 53' (o.g.); Dina 85'	Stadium: Stadionul Dinamo; Attendance: 3,283; Referee: Lucian Rusandu

21 March Round 23	FC Brașov	1–0	Dinamo București	Brașov
20:30	C.Ganea 88'; Bencun (red card) 74'	Report		Stadium: Stadionul Silviu Ploeșteanu; Attendance: 1,500; Referee: Istvan Kovacs

3 April Round 24	Dinamo București	0–0	FC Botoșani	Bucharest
20:30		Report		Stadium: Stadionul Dinamo; Attendance: 2,076; Referee: Alexandru Tudor

7 April Round 25	CSMS Iași	1–0	Dinamo București	Iași
21:30	Bole 20'	Report		Stadium: Stadionul Emil Alexandrescu; Attendance: 5,000; Referee: Marcel Bîrsan

11 April Round 26	Dinamo București	2–0	Rapid București	Bucharest
19:00	Čmovš 2' (o.g.); Gavrilă 61'	Report		Stadium: Arena Națională; Attendance: 9,382; Referee: Iulian Dima

19 April Round 27	Universitatea Craiova	0–0	Dinamo București	Craiova
17:30		Report	Filip (red card) 76'	Stadium: Stadionul Extensiv; Attendance: 6,000; Referee: Cristian Balaj

24 April Round 28	Dinamo București	1–1	CFR Cluj	Bucharest
21:30	Elhamed 49'	Report	Camora 53'; Deac (red card) 76'	Stadium: Stadionul Dinamo; Attendance: 2,471; Referee: Ovidiu Hațegan

28 April Round 29	Pandurii Târgu Jiu	3–2	Dinamo București	Târgu Jiu
21:30	Nicoară 9'; Şandru 55'; Nistor 80'	Report	Niculae 13'; Alexe 19'; Grigore (red card) 89'	Stadium: Stadionul Tudor Vladimirescu; Attendance: 3,000; Referee: Alexandru Tudor

3 May Round 30	Dinamo București	1–3	Steaua București	Bucharest
21:00	Elhamed 90+16'	Report	Stanciu 76' (pen.), 79'; Prepeliță 90+20' (pen.)	Stadium: Arena Națională; Attendance: 25,863; Referee: Cristian Balaj

8 May Round 31	Viitorul Constanța	0–2	Dinamo București	Chiajna
21:00		Report	Alexe 63'; Bunoza 70'	Stadium: Stadionul Concordia; Referee: Istvan Kovacs

15 May Round 32	Dinamo București	1–1	Gaz Metan Mediaș	Bucharest
21:00	Pleşca 82' (o.g.)	Report	Zaharia 90'	Stadium: Stadionul Dinamo; Attendance: 2,156; Referee: George Găman

22 May Round 33	Petrolul Ploiești	0–3	Dinamo București	Ploiești
21:00		Report	Gavrilă 28'; Elhamed 30'; Grozav 90'	Stadium: Ilie Oană Stadium; Attendance: 8,000; Referee: Cătălin Popa

29 May Round 34	Dinamo București	0–2	Astra Giurgiu	Bucharest
21:00	Filip (red card) 72'	Report	Alibec 18'; Budescu 55' (pen.)	Stadium: Stadionul Dinamo; Attendance: 2,891; Referee: Florin Marcu

==== Cupa României ====
24 September R32	Fortuna Poiana Câmpina	2–5	Dinamo București	Ploiești
20:30	Cioinac 51'; Munteanu 71'	Report	Rotariu 62', 63', 111'; Bilinski 91', 96'	Stadium: Stadionul Ilie Oană; Attendance: 5,000; Referee: Paul Unimatan

28 October R16	CS Mioveni	1–0	Dinamo București	Pitești
18:00	Ayza 23'	Report		Stadium: Stadionul Nicolae Dobrin; Attendance: 10,000; Referee: Marian Balaci

==== Cupa Ligii ====
21 July R16	Concordia Chiajna	1–3	Dinamo București	Chiajna
21:00	Olberdam 20'	Report	Bilinski 28'; Lazăr 51'; Boubacar 78' (pen.)	Stadium: Stadionul Concordia; Attendance: 3,000; Referee: Marcel Bîrsan

13 December QF	Dinamo București	1–0 (3–2 p)	Universitatea Cluj	Bucharest
20:00		Report		Stadium: Stadionul Dinamo; Attendance: 1,500; Referee: Sebastian Colțescu

17 February SF Leg1	Pandurii Târgu Jiu	2–1	Dinamo București	Târgu Jiu
19:00	Roman 8'; Eric 84'	Report	Filip 78'	Stadium: Stadionul Tudor Vladimirescu; Attendance: 1,500; Referee: Marius Avram

10 March SF Leg2	Dinamo București	1–3	Pandurii Târgu Jiu	Bucharest
18:30	Grozav 84'	Report	Matulevičius 65' (pen.); Pleaşcă 71'; Răduţ 89'	Stadium: Stadionul Dinamo; Attendance: 5,826; Referee: George Găman
