= 2013–14 FC Dinamo București season =

FC Dinamo București
2013–14 season
- Chairman: Ionuț Negoiță
- Manager: Gheorghe Mulțescu (until 22 September); Flavius Stoican (from 22 September)
- Liga I: 4th
- Cupa României: Semifinals
- Top goalscorer: League: Cosmin Matei (8 goals); All: Dorin Rotariu, Cosmin Matei (9 goals)
| Home colours | Away colours |

The 2013–14 season was FC Dinamo București's 65th consecutive season in Liga I. In this season, Dinamo played in Liga I and Cupa României. Dinamo finished the previous season on the 6th place in Liga I and missed a qualification for a European competition for the first time since 1998.

Thus, the club changed its technical staff, Gheorghe Mulțescu replacing Cornel Ţălnar as head-coach, and made several changes in the squad. The goalscorer from the previous season, Marius Alexe, was loaned in Serie A, at Sassuolo Calcio. After a poor start of the season, Mulțescu was sacked in September and Flavius Stoican was promoted from the second team of the club.

Dinamo ended the season on the fourth spot, a position that guaranteed the qualification for the Europa League, but after the club announced to open the insolvency procedure, the Romanian Federation withdrew the rights to play in the European competition.

== Review ==
=== Pre-season ===
Dinamo started its preparations for the new season on 17 June. 33 players were present for the first training session. Some of them were promoted from the second team and others were bought for tests with Dinamo. Between 22 and 29 June, Dinamo had a mountain preparation, at Poiana Brașov. The squad was formed by 27 players, eight of them being brought during this summer. The mountain training ended with a test-game, against newly promoted in Liga I Corona Brașov. Dinamo lost the game 1–0.

From 1 July until 13 July, Dinamo moved to England, in the Leeds area, for a training camp during which, the team played a large number of friendly games. Some of its opponents were Oldham Athletic AFC and Heart of Midlothian FC.

=== Season ===
==== July ====
Dinamo started the season away at the newly promoted ACS Poli Timișoara. Poli won the game 2–0.

The first home game in this season was played on National Arena. On 28 July, Dinamo defeated FC Vaslui 2–0. Dorin Rotariu scored his first goal in Liga I, the day before his 18th birthday.

==== August ====
In the third round of the championship, on 5 August, Dinamo met Viitorul Constanţa, and failed again to win against the team owned by Gheorghe Hagi. The game played in Chiajna ended 0-0. In three direct games, Dinamo never beat Viitorul.

The first episode of the season from the Eternal derby was played on 11 August. Dinamo was considered the host, the game being played at Arena Națională. Steaua started perfectly, with a goal scored in the fifth minute, by Iasmin Latovlevici. Collins Fai scored an own goal in the 38th minute, trying to send the ball back to his own keeper who didn't understand the decision of his colleague. In the second half, Dorin Rotariu scored his second goal of the season, but Steaua won 2–1.

Dinamo could not find the way to a win neither in the next game, against newly promoted Corona Braşov, a team without a point after four matches. Elton opened the score with his first goal for Dinamo, but the home side equalised before half time and despite a few chances missed by Cosmin Matei in the second half, the score remained 1-1. With only five points in five games, this was the worst start of a season for Dinamo since 2004.

The following round, Dinamo defeated U.Cluj, recording the biggest win of the season in Liga I, 6–0. Dinamo hadn't won by such margins for eight years, since a game against FCM Bacău played in September 2005. Dragoș Grigore scored twice in his 100th game for Dinamo in Liga I.

==== September ====
After three weeks without games, due to the national team's matches, Dinamo travelled on 13 September to Târgu Jiu, to meet Pandurii. Dinamo started well, opened the score after a goal by Cosmin Matei, and had other chances to double its advantage, but a red card seen by Constantin Grecu forced Dinamo to take a step back, and Pandurii managed to score twice in the final 15 minutes and won 2–1.

The following round, Dinamo met Petrolul Ploiești at Arena Națională. Dinamo opened the score through Alexandru Curtean but then tried to defend the advantage and Petrolul dominated the game. Cristian Bălgrădean was the hero for Dinamo, saving a penalty, in the 53rd minute, and other big chances missed by Petrolul. But in the 89th minute, the defence could not stop Juan Albin who scored the equalising goal, and the game ended in a draw.

After the draw against Petrolul, Gheorghe Mulțescu was sacked, the owner reproaching the poor results, Dinamo managing to win only two games from the first eight played.

The same day when Mulțescu was sacked, his place was taken by Flavius Stoican, head coach from the second Dinamo team.

Stoican started his spell with a win, against Sănătatea Cluj in Cupa României. In this game, Kevin Zougoula made his debut for Dinamo, with a brace.

In the first championship game with Stoican as manager, Dinamo came from behind at Galați, against Oțelul, and won 2–1 with goals scored by Dragoș Grigore and Dorin Rotariu.

==== October ====
Dinamo faced Ceahlăul Piatra Neamț at home and took an early lead, after Steven Thicot's first goal for the Bucharest squad. But Bojan Golubovic equalised three minutes before half time and the match ended in a draw. This were the first points lost since Stoican was instated as head coach. The first defeat under Stoican's spell came in the next round, away, against Astra Giurgiu. Astra led 2–0, Dinamo managed to score once in the final minute of the first half, but without a goal after the break, Dinamo suffered the fourth defeat of the season.

On 28 October, George Ţucudean became the first striker who scored a goal for Dinamo in this Liga I season. Ţucudean opened the score in the game against Concordia Chiajna, game won by Dinamo, 2–1. No other striker managed to score in the first 11 games of the season.

On the last day of October, Dinamo qualified to the Romanian Cup quarter-finals. Dinamo won 5–0 against Chindia Târgoviște from Liga III. Joël Thomas, Alexandre Durimel and Valentin Lazăr scored their first goals for Dinamo in this game.

==== November ====
The first game of November was played at home where Dinamo met FC Brașov. Dinamo led 2–0, Thicot scoring in the last minute of the first half and Lazăr doubled the score in the second half. Brașov managed to score once, after a penalty, but Dinamo won 2-1 and reached the third win in a row, in all competitions.

Dinamo failed to register the third win in a row in the championship, losing the following round, away at CFR Cluj. Florin Costea scored the only goal of the game. Dinamo played for over an hour with an extra player after CFR'Ionuț Rada was sent off in the 31st minute, but could not scored. Since Ionuţ Negoiță took over the club, Dinamo never managed to win three games in a row in Liga I.

On 12 November, Ionel Dănciulescu ended his career as a footballer and became team-manager at Dinamo. Dănciulescu played 356 games for Dinamo in Liga I, scoring 152 goals. He became champion of Romania three times with Dinamo and won the Romanian Cup four times.

On 24 November, when the head coach Flavius Stoican celebrated his 37th birthday, Dinamo won the game against Gaz Metan Mediaș. George Țucudean scored the only goal of the game. The next round, Dinamo won with the same score, 1–0, at Săgeata Năvodari. It was only the second win away from home.

==== December ====
On 4 December, Dinamo qualified for the semifinals of the Romanian Cup. Dinamo won 1–0 against Pandurii, with a goal scored by Dragoș Grigore. After this game, Cosmin Matei lost the captaincy of the team. Matei was replaced in the 70th minute and had a nervous reaction to the decision, thus the head coach, Stoican, decided to take Matei's armband and gave it to Dragoș Grigore.

The fourth win in a row with the same score, 1–0, came in the following championship game, against FC Botoșani. Țucudean scored the only goal of the meeting.

The last home game for 2013 came against ACS Poli Timișoara. Dinamo defeated Poli 4–0, Dorin Rotariu managing to score once and assist the other three goals.

On 17 December, Dinamo drew away against FC Vaslui. The home team scored through a penalty transformed by Liviu Antal, but George Țucudean equalised in the second half. Thus, Dinamo finished the year on the 5th position.

==== January ====
When the winter transfer period started, Dinamo bought Polish player Kamil Biliński, but decided to sell two players from the first team, Srdjan Luchin and Alexandru Curtean. The two were sold to Botev Plovdiv for one million euros, according to the Romanian press.

==== February ====
The spring season started badly for Dinamo who failed to beat at home Viitorul Constanța. Dinamo led after a goal scored by Țucudean in the sixth minute, but Viitorul scored twice in the last 10 minute. First, Ionuț Cioinac, who made his debut for Dinamo, scored an own goal, then he brought down an opponent in the box and Larie put Viitorul ahead from the penalty spot.

==== March ====
The month of March started with the eternal derby. On 1 March, Dinamo played at Steaua and led after a goal scored by Dragoș Grigore from a penalty in the 58th minute. Steaua equalized late, in the 89th minute, and thus the game ended with a draw.

The first official win of 2014 came on 10 March, in a game against Corona Brașov. Valentin Lazăr scored the only goal of the game and Dinamo climbed to the fourth position in Liga I for the first time this season. The following week, Dinamo won at Universitatea Cluj, only the third win away this season. Cosmin Matei scored the only goal of the game.

The third home loss was registered on 22 March, against Pandurii Tg.Jiu. Kamil Bilinski scored twice for Dinamo, his first goals since he was transferred from Žalgiris Vilnius, but Pandurii won in the end 3–2.

On 27 March, Dinamo were outwitted and outclassed as they were heavily beaten by their biggest rivals, Steaua, 5–2, in the first leg of the Romanian Cup semifinals.

The third game in a row without a win came in Ploiești, against Petrolul. The team managed by Răzvan Lucescu led twice, but Dinamo managed to equalise every time. Ştefan Bărboianu scored the first goal for Dinamo, then an own goal in second half from Guilherme settled the final score: 2-2. After this game, Dinamo descended a place in the Liga I standings, ending the month of March on the fifth position.

==== April ====
Dinamo moved back to the fourth spot in the championship after a 3–1 win against Oțelul Galați. Grigore and Rotariu scored again, the two remaining on the top positions regarding the goalscorers of the season for Dinamo.

1-0 became the favourite result for Flavius Stoican. The sixth win with this score came against Ceahlaul. The only goal was scored by Cosmin Matei.

In the Romanian Cup, Dinamo failed to qualify for the final. In the second leg of the semifinals, Dinamo couldn't revert the score against Steaua. The game ended 1-1 and Steaua qualified for the final with a 6–3 win on aggregate.

The third win in a row in the championship came against Astra Giurgiu. Ionuț Șerban scored his first goal for Dinamo, and Dorin Rotariu found the net for the seventh time this season, bringing a 2–0 win for Dinamo who remained fourth in the standings.

The good round of results continued, Dinamo managing to win for the fourth consecutive time in the championship. A 3–1 win against Concordia Chiajna moved Dinamo closer to its objective, the return to the Europa League.

==== May ====
The winning streak ended abruptly when Dinamo lost against a side that fights against relegation, FC Brașov. Despite the loss, Dinamo kept the fourth spot of the standings. It was the first away loss after six months, since the defeat suffered against CFR Cluj, at the beginning of November.

The second loss in a row came at home, against CFR Cluj. Dinamo failed to defeat on the own stadium against CFR for the fifth consecutive season, the Railwaymen winning four games and drawing the fifth.

Another winless game, the third in a row, was registered away from home, against Gaz Metan. Dinamo led 1–0, missed a penalty through Dragos Grigore, and was equalised in the dying seconds.

The first win after three winless games came against Săgeata Năvodari. Dinamo scored four times and Valentin Lazăr shone with his first brace for the club. With this win, Dinamo secured the fourth spot and consequently the place for the Europa League.

The last game of the season was played in Botoșani. The home team opened the score after a penalty given for handball by Adrian Popa. Bilinski equalised before half time. In the second half, Dinamo earned a penalty after a foul by Stojkov against Bărboianu, but Lazăr missed. Finally, Bilinski scored his second goal in this game and Dinamo won 2–1. Despite finishing fourth, Dinamo haven't qualify for Europa League after the decision from the Romanian Federation to withdraw the club's licence because of the insolvency procedures.

== Players ==
=== Squad changes ===
Transfers in:

| No. | Pos. | Nat. | Name | Age | EU | Moving from | Type | Transfer window | Ends | Transfer fee | Source |
|---|---|---|---|---|---|---|---|---|---|---|---|
| 6 | DF | (Croatia) | Antonio Asanović | 21 | EU | CS Turnu Severin | Transfer | Summer | 2016 | Free | gsp.ro |
| 44 | MF | (Bosnia and Herzegovina) | Mirza Hasanović | 22 | Non-EU | CS Turnu Severin | Transfer | Summer | 2016 | Free | oricesport.com |
| 13 | MF | (Romania) | Valentin Lazăr | 23 | EU | Sportul Studențesc | Transfer | Summer | 2018 | Free | prosport.ro |
| 16 | DF | (France) | Alexandre Durimel | 23 | EU | CS Turnu Severin | Transfer | Summer | 2016 | Free | gsp.ro |
| 30 | FW | (Senegal) | Pape N'Daw | 19 | Non-EU | Niary Tally (Senegal) | Transfer | Summer | 2016 | Free | prosport.ro |
| 9 | FW | (France) | Joël Thomas | 25 | EU | CS Turnu Severin | Transfer | Summer | 2016 | Free | fcdinamo.ro |
| 18 | MF | (Romania) | Andrei Vaștag | 19 | EU | Viitorul Constanța | Transfer | Summer | 2018 | Free | fcdinamo.ro |
| 14 | DF | (Cameroon) | Collins Fai | 20 | Non-EU | Union Douala (Cameroon) | Transfer | Summer | 2016 | Undisclosed | fcdinamo.ro |
| 17 | MF | (Brazil) | Elton Figueiredo | 27 | Non-EU | Vitória (Brazil) | Transfer | Summer | 2014 | Free | digisport.ro |
| 5 | DF | (France) | Steven Thicot | 26 | EU | Naval (Portugal) | Transfer | Summer | 2016 | Undisclosed | fcdinamo.ro |
| 88 | DF | (Romania) | Constantin Grecu | 25 | EU | Petrolul Ploiești | Transfer | Summer | 2016 | Free | fcdinamo.ro |
| | DF | (Romania) | Ștefan Mardare | 25 | EU | Rapid București | Transfer | Summer | 2016 | Undisclosed | fcdinamo.ro |
| 18 | DF | (Romania) | Ionuț Șerban | 18 | EU | Sportul Studențesc | Transfer | Summer | 2017 | Free | fcdinamo.ro |
| 6 | MF | (Senegal) | Pape Diakhatè | 24 | Non-EU | Eupen (Belgium) | Transfer | Summer | 2016 | Undisclosed | fcdinamo.ro |
| 22 | FW | (Ivory Coast) | Kévin Zougoula | 25 | Non-EU | Sewe Sport (Ivory Coast) | Transfer | Summer | 2016 | Free | gsp.ro |
| 20 | DF | (Romania) | Ștefan Bărboianu | 25 | EU | Astra Giurgiu | Transfer | Winter | 2016 | Free | fcdinamo.ro |
| 99 | FW | (Poland) | Kamil Biliński | 25 | Non-EU | Žalgiris Vilnius (Lithuania) | Transfer | Winter | 2016 | Free | prosport.ro |
| 15 | DF | (Romania) | Alexandru Giurgiu | 21 | EU | Astra Giurgiu | Transfer | Winter | Undisclosed | Free | gsp.ro |
| 22 | MF | (Romania) | Ionuț Cioinac | 23 | EU | ASA Târgu Mureș | Transfer | Winter | Undisclosed | Free | fcdinamo.ro |

Transfers out:

| No. | Pos. | Nat. | Name | Age | EU | Moving to | Type | Transfer window | Transfer fee | Source |
|---|---|---|---|---|---|---|---|---|---|---|
| | DF | (Romania) | Cristian Scutaru | 26 | EU | ACS Poli Timișoara | Released | Summer | | digisport.ro |
| | DF | (Romania) | Nicolae Mușat | 26 | EU | FC Vaslui | Released | Summer | | gsp.ro |
| | DF | (Romania) | Alexandru Tudose | 26 | EU | Corona Braşov | Released | Summer | | ziuanews.ro |
| | DF | (Romania) | Alexandru Dandea | 25 | EU | Hoverla Uzhhorod (Ukraine) | Released | Summer | | prosport.ro |
| | FW | (Romania) | Mircea Axente | 26 | EU | Viitorul Constanţa | Released | Summer | Free | prosport.ro |
| | DF | (Romania) | Constantin Nica | 20 | EU | Atalanta (Italy) | Transfer | Summer | €1.5 mil. | prosport.ro |
| | FW | (Romania) | Andrei Cristea | 29 | EU | FC Brașov | Released | Summer | | onlinesport.ro |
| 25 | FW | (Romania) | Ionel Dănciulescu | 36 | EU | | Retired | Winter | | fcdinamo.ro |
| 44 | MF | (Bosnia and Herzegovina) | Mirza Hasanović | 23 | Non-EU | | Released | Winter | | prosport.ro |
| 22 | FW | (Ivory Coast) | Kévin Zougoula | 25 | Non-EU | | Released | Winter | | mediafax.ro |
| 4 | DF | (Romania) | Srdjan Luchin | 27 | EU | Botev Plovdiv (Bulgaria) | Sold | Winter | Undisclosed | botevplovdiv.bg |
| 8 | MF | (Romania) | Alexandru Curtean | 26 | EU | Botev Plovdiv (Bulgaria) | Sold | Winter | Undisclosed | botevplovdiv.bg |

Last updated: 2014-01-11

Loans in:

| No. | Pos. | Nat. | Name | Age | EU | Moving from | Type | Transfer window | Ends | Transfer fee | Source |
|---|---|---|---|---|---|---|---|---|---|---|---|
| 29 | FW | (Romania) | George Țucudean | 22 | EU | Standard Liège (Belgium) | Loan | Summer | 2014 | | fcdinamo.ro |
| 30 | FW | (Romania) | Gelu Velici | 21 | EU | Ceahlăul Piatra Neamț | Loan | Winter | 2014 | | fcdinamo.ro |

Loans out:

| No. | Pos. | Nat. | Name | Age | EU | Moving to | Type | Transfer window | Transfer fee | Source |
|---|---|---|---|---|---|---|---|---|---|---|
| 27 | MF | (Romania) | Raphael Stănescu | 19 | EU | Corona Braşov | Loaned out | Summer | | gsp.ro |
| 10 | FW | (Romania) | Marius Alexe | 23 | EU | Sassuolo (Italy) | Loaned out | Summer | | sptfm.ro |
| 24 | DF | (Romania) | Adrian Popa | 23 | EU | U.Cluj | Loaned out | Summer | | stiridesport.ro |
| 22 | MF | (Romania) | Sorin Strătilă | 26 | EU | Concordia Chiajna | Loaned out | Summer | | digisport.ro |
| 6 | DF | (Croatia) | Antonio Asanović | 21 | EU | Corona Braşov | Loaned out | Summer | | gsp.ro |
| 15 | ST | (Romania) | Valentin Balint | 19 | EU | Corona Braşov | Loaned out | Summer | | stiridesport.ro |

Last updated: 2014-2-21

=== Squad statistics ===
| No. | Pos. | Player | League | | | | Cup | | | |
| No. | Pos. | Player | Apps | Starts | Goals | Assists | Apps | Starts | Goals | Assists |
|---|---|---|---|---|---|---|---|---|---|---|
| 3 | DF | (Romania) Crișan | 2 | 1 | 0 | 0 | 0 | 0 | 0 | 0 |
| 5 | DF | (France) Thicot | 20 | 20 | 2 | 0 | 3 | 3 | 0 | 0 |
| 7 | MF | (Romania) Munteanu | 6 | 5 | 0 | 1 | 1 | 0 | 0 | 0 |
| 8 | MF | (Romania) Rotariu | 31 | 19 | 7 | 6 | 4 | 3 | 2 | 0 |
| 9 | FW | (France) Thomas | 15 | 6 | 0 | 0 | 1 | 1 | 2 | 0 |
| 10 | MF | (Romania) Matei | 29 | 27 | 8 | 4 | 3 | 3 | 1 | 1 |
| 12 | GK | (Romania) Samoilă | 1 | 1 | 0 | 0 | 0 | 0 | 0 | 0 |
| 14 | DF | (Cameroon) Fai | 11 | 8 | 0 | 1 | 1 | 1 | 0 | 1 |
| 16 | DF | (France) Durimel | 14 | 13 | 0 | 0 | 5 | 5 | 2 | 1 |
| 17 | MF | (Brazil) Elton | 25 | 19 | 1 | 2 | 3 | 3 | 0 | 1 |
| 18 | DF | (Romania) Șerban | 21 | 11 | 1 | 1 | 4 | 1 | 0 | 2 |
| 19 | MF | (Senegal) Boubacar | 28 | 24 | 2 | 4 | 3 | 3 | 0 | 0 |
| 20 | DF | (Romania) Bărboianu | 11 | 9 | 1 | 0 | 2 | 2 | 0 | 0 |
| 21 | DF | (Romania) Grigore | 31 | 31 | 6 | 0 | 4 | 4 | 1 | 0 |
| 22 | MF | (Romania) Cioinac | 1 | 0 | 0 | 0 | 0 | 0 | 0 | 0 |
| 23 | GK | (North Macedonia) Naumovski | 7 | 7 | 0 | 0 | 1 | 1 | 0 | 0 |
| 24 | DF | (Romania) Popa | 6 | 3 | 0 | 1 | 1 | 0 | 0 | 0 |
| 26 | MF | (Romania) Rus | 30 | 29 | 2 | 5 | 4 | 4 | 0 | 2 |
| 27 | DF | (Romania) Nedelcearu | 1 | 0 | 0 | 0 | 1 | 0 | 0 | 0 |
| 28 | MF | (Romania) Buia | 3 | 0 | 0 | 0 | 0 | 0 | 0 | 0 |
| 29 | FW | (Romania) Țucudean | 22 | 19 | 7 | 5 | 4 | 2 | 0 | 0 |
| 30 | FW | (Romania) Velici | 7 | 0 | 0 | 0 | 0 | 0 | 0 | 0 |
| 34 | GK | (Romania) Bălgrădean | 26 | 26 | 0 | 0 | 4 | 4 | 0 | 0 |
| 35 | MF | (Romania) Tîrcoveanu | 1 | 0 | 0 | 0 | 0 | 0 | 0 | 0 |
| 37 | MF | (Romania) Dobre | 1 | 0 | 0 | 0 | 0 | 0 | 0 | 0 |
| 44 | DF | (Croatia) Asanović | 2 | 1 | 0 | 0 | 0 | 0 | 0 | 0 |
| 77 | DF | (Romania) Filip | 22 | 20 | 0 | 1 | 4 | 3 | 0 | 0 |
| 88 | DF | (Romania) Grecu | 12 | 10 | 0 | 1 | 3 | 3 | 0 | 0 |
| 93 | MF | (Romania) Lazăr | 30 | 23 | 4 | 8 | 5 | 4 | 2 | 3 |
| 99 | FW | (Poland) Biliński | 10 | 7 | 4 | 1 | 2 | 0 | 0 | 0 |
Players retired, sold or loaned out during the season
| 4 | DF | (Romania) Luchin | 13 | 13 | 1 | 0 | 2 | 1 | 0 | 0 |
| 8 | MF | (Romania) Curtean | 18 | 17 | 4 | 2 | 3 | 2 | 0 | 1 |
| 15 | FW | (Romania) Balint | 5 | 1 | 0 | 1 | 0 | 0 | 0 | 0 |
| 22 | FW | (Ivory Coast) Zougoula | 5 | 0 | 0 | 0 | 1 | 1 | 2 | 0 |
| 25 | FW | (Romania) Dănciulescu | 5 | 2 | 0 | 2 | 1 | 1 | 1 | 0 |
| 30 | FW | (Senegal) N'Daw | 4 | 2 | 0 | 0 | 0 | 0 | 0 | 0 |

Statistics accurate as of match played 21 May 2014

=== Disciplinary record ===
Includes all competitive matches.

Last updated on 21 May 2014

| No. | Pos | Player | Liga I | | | Cupa României | | |
| No. | Pos | Player | Yellow card | (yellow card) (yellow-red card) | Red card | Yellow card | (yellow card) (yellow-red card) | Red card |
| 5 | DF | Steven Thicot | 2 | 0 | 0 | 1 | 0 | 0 |
| 7 | MF | Cătălin Munteanu | 1 | 0 | 0 | 0 | 0 | 0 |
| 8 | MF | Dorin Rotariu | 2 | 0 | 0 | 0 | 0 | 0 |
| 9 | FW | Joël Thomas | 4 | 0 | 0 | 0 | 0 | 0 |
| 10 | MF | Cosmin Matei | 5 | 1 | 0 | 0 | 0 | 0 |
| 14 | DF | Collins Fai | 4 | 0 | 0 | 0 | 0 | 0 |
| 16 | DF | Alexandre Durimel | 1 | 0 | 0 | 0 | 0 | 0 |
| 17 | MF | Elton Figueiredo | 3 | 0 | 0 | 2 | 0 | 0 |
| 18 | MF | Ionuț Șerban | 2 | 0 | 0 | 0 | 0 | 0 |
| 19 | MF | Boubacar Mansaly | 4 | 0 | 0 | 0 | 0 | 0 |
| 20 | DF | Ștefan Bărboianu | 4 | 0 | 0 | 0 | 0 | 0 |
| 21 | DF | Dragoș Grigore | 6 | 0 | 0 | 3 | 0 | 0 |
| 22 | MF | Ionuț Cioinac | 1 | 0 | 0 | 0 | 0 | 0 |
| 23 | GK | Kristijan Naumovski | 2 | 0 | 0 | 0 | 0 | 0 |
| 26 | MF | Laurențiu Rus | 7 | 0 | 0 | 1 | 0 | 0 |
| 28 | MF | Darius Buia | 1 | 0 | 0 | 0 | 0 | 0 |
| 29 | FW | George Ţucudean | 10 | 0 | 0 | 0 | 0 | 0 |
| 30 | FW | Gelu Velici | 2 | 0 | 0 | 0 | 0 | 0 |
| 34 | GK | Cristian Bălgrădean | 4 | 0 | 0 | 1 | 0 | 0 |
| 77 | MF | Steliano Filip | 7 | 0 | 0 | 1 | 0 | 0 |
| 88 | DF | Constantin Grecu | 2 | 1 | 0 | 1 | 0 | 0 |
| 93 | MF | Valentin Lazăr | 6 | 0 | 0 | 0 | 0 | 0 |
| 99 | FW | Kamil Biliński | 2 | 0 | 0 | 0 | 0 | 0 |
Players retired, sold or loaned out during the season
| 4 | DF | Srdjan Luchin | 3 | 0 | 0 | 1 | 0 | 0 |
| 8 | MF | Alexandru Curtean | 2 | 0 | 0 | 2 | 0 | 0 |
| 15 | FW | Valentin Balint | 2 | 0 | 0 | 0 | 0 | 0 |
| 25 | FW | Ionel Dănciulescu | 1 | 0 | 0 | 0 | 0 | 0 |
| 30 | FW | Pape N'Daw | 1 | 0 | 0 | 0 | 0 | 0 |

== Competitions ==
=== Overall ===
FC Dinamo played in two competitions: Liga I and Cupa României.

| Competition | Started round | Current position / round | Final position / round | First match | Last match |
|---|---|---|---|---|---|
| Liga I | Round 1 | | 4 | vs ACS Poli | vs FC Botoșani |
| Cupa României | Round of 32 | | Semifinals | vs Sănătatea Cluj | vs Steaua București |

=== Liga I ===
==== Standings ====
| Pos | Team | Pld | W | D | L | GF | GA | GD | Pts | Qualification or relegation |
|---|---|---|---|---|---|---|---|---|---|---|
| 2 | Astra Giurgiu | 34 | 22 | 6 | 6 | 70 | 28 | +42 | 72 | Qualification to Europa League third qualifying round |
| 3 | Petrolul Ploiești | 34 | 18 | 14 | 2 | 53 | 20 | +33 | 68 | Qualification to Europa League second qualifying round |
| 4 | Dinamo București | 34 | 17 | 8 | 9 | 52 | 34 | +18 | 59 | (Note: Vaslui did not receive a license for financial reasons. Dinamo București filed for insolvency, thus didn't get an UEFA licence. CFR Cluj got their Europa League spot.) |
| 5 | CFR Cluj | 34 | 13 | 12 | 9 | 44 | 33 | +11 | 51 | Qualification to Europa League second qualifying round |
| 6 | Vaslui (R) | 34 | 15 | 6 | 13 | 38 | 32 | +6 | 51 | Relegation to Liga IV |

Source: Liga I (in Romanian)
Rules for classification: 1) points; 2) goal difference; 3) number of goals scored.
(R) Relegated

==== Results summary ====
| Overall | | | | | | | | Home | | | | | | Away | | | | | |
| Pld | W | D | L | GF | GA | GD | Pts | W | D | L | GF | GA | GD | W | D | L | GF | GA | GD |
|---|---|---|---|---|---|---|---|---|---|---|---|---|---|---|---|---|---|---|---|
| 34 | 17 | 8 | 9 | 52 | 34 | +18 | 59 | 11 | 2 | 4 | 34 | 16 | +18 | 6 | 6 | 5 | 18 | 18 | 0 |

Last updated: 21 May 2014.
Source: Competitive Matches

==== Results by round ====
| Round | 1 | 2 | 3 | 4 | 5 | 6 | 7 | 8 | 9 | 10 | 11 | 12 | 13 | 14 | 15 | 16 | 17 | 18 | 19 | 20 | 21 | 22 | 23 | 24 | 25 | 26 | 27 | 28 | 29 | 30 | 31 | 32 | 33 | 34 |
|---|---|---|---|---|---|---|---|---|---|---|---|---|---|---|---|---|---|---|---|---|---|---|---|---|---|---|---|---|---|---|---|---|---|---|
| Ground | A | H | A | H | A | H | A | H | A | H | A | H | H | A | H | A | H | H | A | H | A | H | A | H | A | H | A | H | A | A | H | A | H | A |
| Result | L | W | D | L | D | W | L | D | W | D | L | W | W | L | W | W | W | W | D | L | D | W | W | L | D | W | W | W | W | L | L | D | W | W |
| Position | 17 | 10 | 9 | 12 | 11 | 9 | 11 | 12 | 7 | 7 | 10 | 9 | 6 | 8 | 6 | 6 | 5 | 5 | 5 | 5 | 5 | 4 | 4 | 4 | 5 | 4 | 4 | 4 | 4 | 4 | 4 | 4 | 4 | 4 |

Updated to match(es) played on 21 May 2014. Source: Competitive matches
A = Away; H = Home; W = Win; D = Draw; L = Loss

=== Competitive ===
==== Liga I ====
Kickoff times are in EET.

| 19 July Round 1 | ACS Poli | 2–0 | Dinamo București | Timișoara |
| 20:45 | Szekely 39'; Bărbuț 63' | Report | | Stadium: Stadionul Dan Păltinișanu; Attendance: 10,000; Referee: Sebastian Colțescu (Craiova) |

| 28 July Round 2 | Dinamo București | 2–0 | FC Vaslui | Bucharest |
| 21:30 | Rotariu 57'; Matei 90+6' (pen.) | Report | | Stadium: Arena Națională; Attendance: 10,684; Referee: Alexandru Tudor (București) |

| 5 August Round 3 | Viitorul Constanța | 0–0 | Dinamo București | Chiajna |
| 19:30 | | Report | | Stadium: Stadionul Concordia; Attendance: 4,000; Referee: Ovidiu Haţegan (Arad) |

| 11 August Round 4 | Dinamo București | 1–2 | Steaua București | Bucharest |
| 21:30 | Rotariu 67' | Report | Latovlevici 5'; Fai 38' (o.g.) | Stadium: Arena Națională; Attendance: 28,574; Referee: Cristian Balaj (Baia Mare) |

| 16 August Round 5 | Corona Brașov | 1–1 | Dinamo București | Brașov |
| 21:30 | Munteanu 40' | Report | Elton 7' | Stadium: Stadionul Silviu Ploieșteanu; Attendance: 4,000; Referee: Marius Avram (București) |

| 23 August Round 6 | Dinamo București | 6–0 | Universitatea Cluj | Bucharest |
| 21:30 | Grigore 28' (pen.), 45' (pen.); Boubacar 30'; Luchin 57'; Curtean 69'; Rotariu 85' | Report | | Stadium: Stadionul Dinamo; Attendance: 4,000; Referee: Marius Bocăneală (Galați) |

| 13 September Round 7 | Pandurii Târgu Jiu | 2–1 | Dinamo București | Târgu Jiu |
| 20:30 | Momčilović 76'; Eric 87' | Report | Matei 36' | Stadium: Stadionul Tudor Vladimirescu; Attendance: 8,000; Referee: Istvan Kovacs (Carei) |

| 21 September Round 8 | Dinamo București | 1–1 | Petrolul Ploiești | Bucharest |
| 21:30 | Curtean 13' | Report | Albín 89' | Stadium: Arena Națională; Attendance: 24,708; Referee: Marius Avram (București) |

| 29 September Round 9 | Oțelul Galați | 1–2 | Dinamo București | Galați |
| 21:30 | Iorga 5' | Report | Grigore 68' (pen.); Rotariu 70' | Stadium: Stadionul Oțelul; Attendance: 6,000; Referee: Teo Crăciunescu (Rm. Vâlcea) |

| 6 October Round 10 | Dinamo București | 1–1 | Ceahlăul Piatra Neamț | Bucharest |
| 14:00 | Thicot 2' | Report | Golubović 42' | Stadium: Stadionul Dinamo; Attendance: 7,500; Referee: Ovidiu Hațegan (Arad) |

| 20 October Round 11 | Astra Giurgiu | 2–1 | Dinamo București | Giurgiu |
| 21:30 | Budescu 1'; Bukari 21' | Report | Rus 45' | Stadium: Stadionul Marin Anastasovici; Attendance: 4,500; Referee: Istvan Kovacs (Carei) |

| 28 October Round 12 | Dinamo București | 2–1 | Concordia Chiajna | Bucharest |
| 19:30 | Țucudean 27'; Grigore 60' (pen.) | Report | Onduku 62' | Stadium: Stadionul Dinamo; Attendance: 6,000; Referee: Marius Bocăneală (Galați) |

| 3 November Round 13 | Dinamo București | 2–1 | FC Brașov | Bucharest |
| 21:30 | Thicot 45'; Lazăr 55' | Report | Aganović 75' (pen.) | Stadium: Stadionul Dinamo; Attendance: 4,927; Referee: Cristian Balaj (Baia Mare) |

| 8 November Round 14 | CFR Cluj | 1–0 | Dinamo București | Cluj-Napoca |
| 21:30 | Costea 9' | Report | | Stadium: Stadionul Dr. Constantin Rădulescu; Attendance: 7,000; Referee: Adrian Cojocaru (Galați) |

| 24 November Round 15 | Dinamo București | 1–0 | Gaz Metan Mediaș | Bucharest |
| 21:00 | Țucudean 45' | Report | | Stadium: Stadionul Dinamo; Attendance: 2,729; Referee: George Găman (Craiova) |

| 30 November Round 16 | Săgeata Năvodari | 0–1 | Dinamo București | Constanța |
| 21:00 | | Report | Curtean 49' | Stadium: Stadionul Farul; Attendance: 1,000; Referee: Cătălin Popa (Pitești) |

| 7 December Round 17 | Dinamo București | 1–0 | FC Botoșani | Bucharest |
| 20:30 | Țucudean 55' | Report | | Stadium: Stadionul Dinamo; Attendance: 3,271; Referee: Istvan Kovacs (Carei) |

| 13 December Round 18 | Dinamo București | 4–0 | ACS Poli | Bucharest |
| 21:00 | Scutaru 11' (o.g.); Rotariu 35'; Boubacar 37'; Curtean 54' | Report | | Stadium: Stadionul Dinamo; Attendance: 3,115; Referee: Adrian Comănescu (Rm. Vâlcea) |

| 17 December Round 19 | FC Vaslui | 1–1 | Dinamo București | Vaslui |
| 20:45 | Antal 44' (pen.) | Report | Țucudean 76' | Stadium: Stadionul Municipal; Attendance: 3,500; Referee: Marius Avram (București) |

| 23 February Round 20 | Dinamo București | 1–2 | Viitorul Constanța | Bucharest |
| 14:00 | Țucudean 6' | Report | Cioinac 81' (o.g.); Larie 89' (pen.) | Stadium: Stadionul Dinamo; Attendance: 11,214; Referee: Istvan Kovacs (Carei) |

| 1 March Round 21 | Steaua București | 1–1 | Dinamo București | Bucharest |
| 21:00 | Keserü 89' | Report | Grigore 57' (pen.) | Stadium: Stadionul Steaua; Attendance: 25,000; Referee: Alexandru Tudor (București) |

| 10 March Round 22 | Dinamo București | 1–0 | Corona Brașov | Bucharest |
| 20:30 | Lazăr 53' | Report | | Stadium: Stadionul Dinamo; Attendance: 3,489; Referee: Paul Unimatan (Zalău) |

| 15 March Round 23 | Universitatea Cluj | 0–1 | Dinamo București | Cluj-Napoca |
| 17:45 | | Report | Matei 60' | Stadium: Cluj Arena; Attendance: 8,000; Referee: Adrian Comănescu (Rm.Valcea) |

| 22 March Round 24 | Dinamo București | 2–3 | Pandurii Târgu Jiu | Bucharest |
| 21:00 | Biliński 71', 82' | Report | Giusti 5'; Momčilović 78'; Elton 90+4' | Stadium: Stadionul Dinamo; Attendance: 5,967; Referee: Cristian Balaj (Baia Mare) |

| 30 March Round 25 | Petrolul Ploiești | 2–2 | Dinamo București | Ploiești |
| 21:00 | Juan Albín 4' (pen.), 34' | Report | Bărboianu 10'; Guilherme 52' (o.g.) | Stadium: Stadionul Ilie Oană; Attendance: 14,000; Referee: Radu Petrescu (București) |

| 7 April Round 26 | Dinamo București | 3–1 | Oțelul Galați | Bucharest |
| 21:00 | Grigore 52' (pen.); Rotariu 60'; Matei 65' | Report | Giurgiu 44' | Stadium: Stadionul Dinamo; Attendance: 3,716; Referee: Adrian Comănescu (Rm. Vâlcea) |

| 13 April Round 27 | Ceahlăul Piatra Neamț | 0–1 | Dinamo București | Piatra Neamț |
| 20:45 | | Report | Matei 52' | Stadium: Stadionul Ceahlăul; Attendance: 4,000; Referee: Marius Avram (București) |

| 20 April Round 28 | Dinamo București | 2–0 | Astra Giurgiu | Bucharest |
| 14:00 | Șerban 48'; Matei 86' | Report | | Stadium: Stadionul Dinamo; Attendance: 2,473; Referee: Ovidiu Hațegan (Arad) |

| 27 April Round 29 | Concordia Chiajna | 1–3 | Dinamo București | Chiajna |
| 19:30 | Welington 51' (pen.) | Report | Rus 20' (pen.); Matei 31' (pen.); Țucudean 34' | Stadium: Stadionul Concordia; Attendance: 2,500; Referee: Alexandru Tudor (București) |

| 3 May Round 30 | FC Brașov | 2–0 | Dinamo București | Brașov |
| 21:30 | Cristea 11'; Mateiu 34' | Report | | Stadium: Stadionul Silviu Ploeșteanu; Attendance: 5,000; Referee: Cristian Balaj (Baia Mare) |

| 6 May Round 31 | Dinamo București | 0–3 | CFR Cluj | Bucharest |
| 21:00 | | Report | Costea 20'; Negruț 48'; Batin 90' | Stadium: Stadionul Dinamo; Attendance: 3,261; Referee: George Găman (Craiova) |

| 10 May Round 32 | Gaz Metan Mediaș | 1–1 | Dinamo București | Mediaş |
| 20:30 | Bawab 90+5' | Report | Matei 16' | Stadium: Stadionul Gaz Metan; Attendance: 3,000; Referee: Andrei Chivulete (București) |

| 16 May Round 33 | Dinamo București | 4–1 | Săgeata Năvodari | Bucharest |
| 19:30 | Lazăr 18', 75'; Țucudean 24'; Matei 43' | Report | Dinu 89' | Stadium: Stadionul Dinamo; Attendance: 2,092; Referee: Alexandru Tudor (București) |

| 21 May Round 34 | FC Botoșani | 1–2 | Dinamo București | Botoșani |
| 18:00 | Fülöp 18' (pen.) | Report | Biliński 27', 78' | Stadium: Stadionul Municipal; Referee: Adrian Cojocaru (Galaţi) |

==== Cupa României ====
| 24 September R32 | Dinamo București | 4–0 | Sănătatea Cluj | Bucharest |
| 20:30 | Zougoula 41', 48'; Dănciulescu 52'; Dorin Rotariu 63' | Report | | Stadium: Stadionul Dinamo; Attendance: 1,000; Referee: Cristina Dorcioman (Câmpulung) |

| 31 October R16 | Dinamo București | 5–0 | Chindia Târgoviște | Bucharest |
| 18:30 | Thomas 8', 64'; Durimel 41', 86'; Lazăr 62' | Report | | Stadium: Stadionul Dinamo; Attendance: 4,826; Referee: Marian Balaci (Drobeta Turnu Severin) |

| 4 December QF | Dinamo București | 1–0 | Pandurii Târgu Jiu | Bucharest |
| 21:30 | Grigore 62' (pen.) | Report | | Stadium: Stadionul Dinamo; Attendance: 5,139; Referee: Alexandru Tudor (București) |

| 27 March SF Leg1 | Steaua București | 5–2 | Dinamo București | Bucharest |
| 20:30 | Latovlevici 22'; Varela 39'; Chipciu 44'; Tănase 45'; Keserü 76' | Report | Rotariu 32'; Lazăr 53' | Stadium: Arena Națională; Attendance: 45,231; Referee: Ovidiu Hațegan (Arad) |

| 17 April SF Leg2 | Dinamo București | 1–1 | Steaua București | Bucharest |
| 20:30 | Matei 87' | Report | Tănase 22' | Stadium: Arena Națională; Attendance: 38,784; Referee: Istvan Kovacs (Carei) |

=== Non competitive matches ===
| Game | Date | Tournament | Round | Ground | Opponent | Score^{1} | Report |
|---|---|---|---|---|---|---|---|
| 1 | 29 June | Friendly | | N | Corona Brașov (Romania) | 0–1 | Report / Report link; Dinamo București / Corona Brașov; Marius Ene (65) |
| 2 | 3 July | Friendly | | N | Livingston (Scotland) | 3–0 | Report / Report link; Dinamo București / Livingston; Marius Alexe (40); Joel Thomas (74); Ionel Dănciulescu (90) |
| 3 | 5 July | Friendly | | N | Oldham Athletic (England) | 2–2 | Report / Report link; Dinamo București / Oldham Athletic; Laurentiu Rus (29); Marius Alexe (60) / J. Baxter (18); C. MacDonald (68) |
| 4 | 7 July | Friendly | | N | Ayr (Scotland) | 1–1 | Report / Report link; Dinamo București / Ayr United; Pape Ndaw (66) / Malcolm (59) |
| 5 | 9 July | Friendly | | N | Heart of Midlothian (Scotland) | 5–1 | Report / Report link; Dinamo București / Heart of Midlothian; Cosmin Matei (16), (51); Joel Thomas (20); Dorin Rotariu (73); Ionel Dănciulescu (86) / Hamill (62) |
| 6 | 11 July | Friendly | | N | Barnsley (England) | 2–2 | Report / Report link; Dinamo București / Barnsley; Alexandru Curtean; Ionel Dănciulescu |
| 7 | 7 September | Friendly | | H (Romania) | Shakhtar Donetsk (Ukraine) | 0–3 | Report / Report link; Dinamo București / Shakhtar Donetsk; / Douglas Costa (8), Luiz Adriano (39 – penalty), Şinder (47) |
| 8 | 19 January | Friendly | | N | Qarabağ (Azerbaijan) | 0–1 | Report / Report link; Dinamo București / Qarabağ; / Leroy (57) |
| 9 | 19 January | Friendly | | N | Luch Vladivostok (Russia) | 0–1 | Report / Report link; Dinamo București / Luch Vladivostok; / Katsaev (57) |
| 10 | 23 January | Friendly | | N | Chornomorets Odesa (Ukraine) | 1–1 | Report / Report link; Dinamo București / Chornomorets Odesa; Gelu Velici (79) / Sito Riera (69) |
| 11 | 30 January | Friendly | | N | Korona Kielce (Poland) | 2–1 | Report / Report link; Dinamo București / Korona Kielce; Ionuț Șerban (33), Kamil Bilinski (56) / Kiełb (5) |
| 12 | 1 February | Friendly | | N | Dynamo Kyiv (Ukraine) | 1–3 | Report / Report link; Dinamo București / Dynamo Kyiv; Dragoș Grigore (81) / Harmach (48), Mbokani (58), Lens (77) |
| 13 | 3 February | Marbella Cup | SF | N | Guangzhou Evergrande (China) | 2–0 | Report / Report link; Dinamo București / Guangzhou Evergrande; George Țucudean (1, 16) |
| 14 | 6 February | Marbella Cup | F | N | IFK Göteborg (Sweden) | 2–0 | Report / Report link; Dinamo București / IFK Göteborg; Steven Thicot (34), Kamil Bilinski (81) |
| 15 | 8 February | Friendly | | N | Lokomotiv Plovdiv (Bulgaria) | 6–1 | Report / Report link; Dinamo București / Lokomotiv Plovdiv; Kamil Bilinski (23), Joel Thomas (26), Dorin Rotariu (54, 60, 75), Ionuț Șerban (74) / Kamburov (90-penalty) |

Last updated: 8 February 2014
Source: www.fcdinamo.ro
^{1}Dinamo goals come first.
National flags for Ground and Opponent columns are only shown when different from that of Dinamo.
M = Match; Ground: H = Home, A = Away, N = Neutral, HR = Home replacement, AR = Away replacement.
