= 2014–15 Cupa României =

Cupa României Timișoreana 2014–15
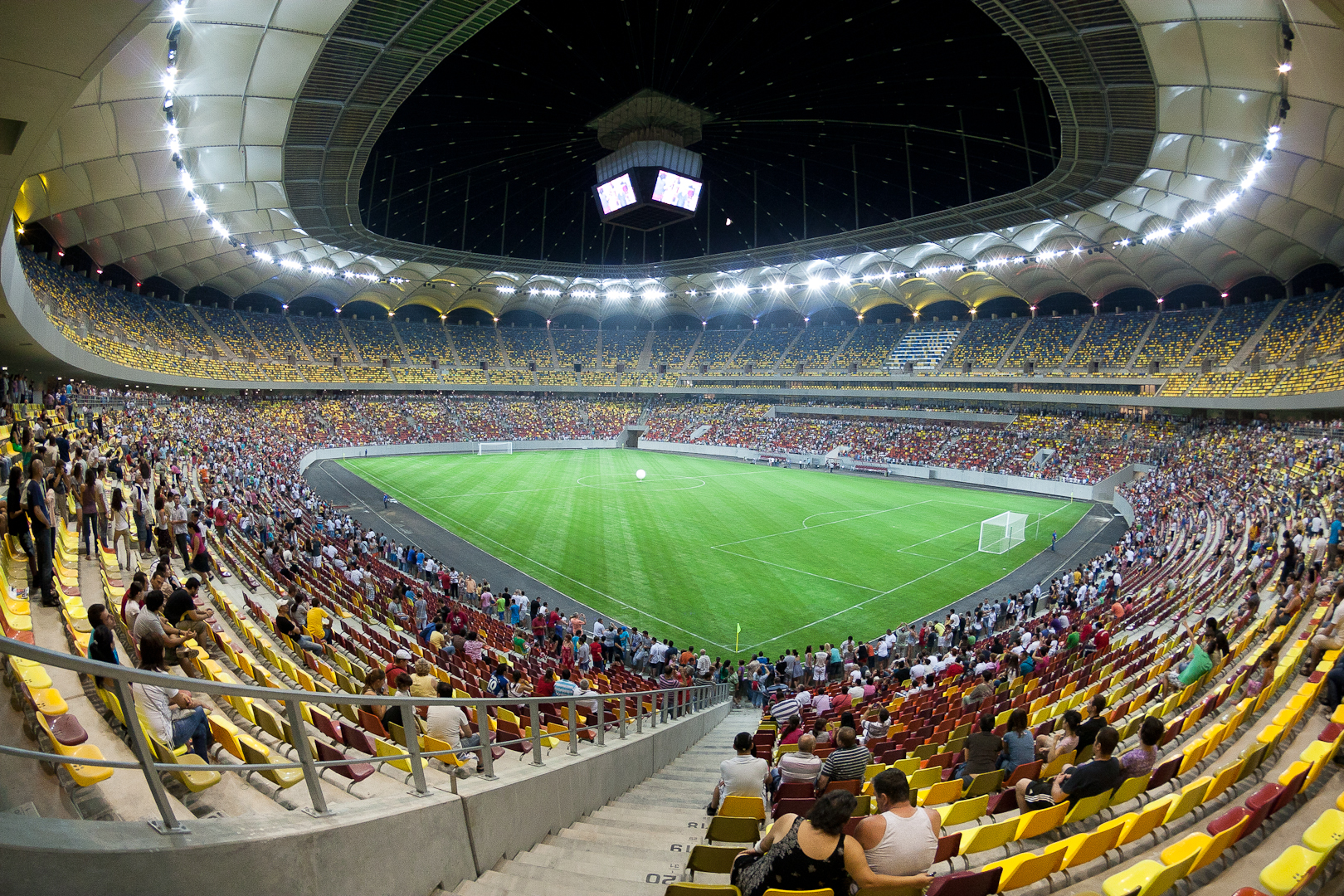
- Arena Naţională in Bucharest hosted the final.

Tournament details
- Country: Romania

Final positions
- Champions: Steaua București
- Runners-up: Universitatea Cluj

The 2014–15 Cupa României was the seventy-seventh season of the annual Romanian primary football knockout tournament. Astra Giurgiu, last season's title holders, were eliminated in the Round of 32 by the Liga II team Mioveni. Steaua București won the tournament.

== First round ==
All matches will be played on the 16 July 2014

Team 1	Score	Team 2
16 July 2014
Victoria Țăndărei	2–1	Rapid Fetești
Lucky Sport Management	0–6	Dinamo II București
Dunărea Ostrov	0–1	Callatis Mangalia
Voința Snagov	4–1	Viitorul Domnești
Viitorul Buzău	w/o	Progresul Cernica
Unirea Brânceni	2–1	Concordia II Chiajna
Arsenal Malu	3–2 (a.e.t.)	Tunari
Înainte Modelu	1–1 (a.e.t.) (2–4 p)	Gloria Popești-Leordeni
Valea Ursului	5–2	Târgoviște
Flacăra Moreni	0–2	Urban Titu
Astra II	0–1	Conpet Ploiești
Sepsi OSK	w/o	Câmpina
Csikszereda Miercurea Ciuc	4–0	Păpăuți
Inter Cristian	w/o	Civitas Făgăraș
Granitul Babadag	6–1	Sporting Liești
Sportul Chișcani	3–4	Avântul Conpet Cireșu
Gloria Ivești	1–2	Oțelul II Galați
Young Stars Panciu	4–0	Moinești
Vitis Suletea	1–5	Aerostar Bacău
Dinamo Onești	w/o	Bacău
Voința Ion Creangă	4–3	Ceahlăul II Piatra Neamț
TransDor Tudora	4–0	Bucovina Rădăuți
Rapid Dumești	3–0	Bucovina Pojorâta
Progresul Frătăuții Vechi	4–1	Sporting Suceava
Gloria II Bistrița	3–1	Unirea Dej
Inter Ciugud	0–7	Arieșul Turda
Înfrățirea Valea Izvoarelor	0–3	Avântul Reghin
Someșul 2010 Apahida	2–4	Unirea Jucu
Sânmartin	5–2	Sănătatea Cluj
Sportul Șimleu Silvaniei	4–1	Zalău
Speranța Coltău	1–10	Baia Mare
Someșul Oar	w/o	Maramureș Universitar Baia Mare
UTA Bătrâna Doamnă	4–3	Muncitorul Reșița
Politehnica Timișoara	2–0	Millenium Giarmata
Minerul Anina	3–0	CSM Școlar Reșița
Minerul Valea Copcii Mehedinți	w/o	Minerul Jilț Mătăsari
Gilortul Târgu Cărbunești	1–2	Știința Turceni
Retezatul Hațeg	w/o	Jiul Rovinari
Flacăra Horezu	2–0	Viitorul Municipal Craiova
Viitorul Cârcea	0–2	Podari
Milcov	w/o	Balș
Speranța Biertan	w/o	Avrig

== Second round ==
All matches will be played on the 30 July 2014

Team 1	Score	Team 2
30 July 2014
Inter Cristian	3–0	Conpet Ploiești
Urban Titu	0–1	Chindia Târgoviște
Atletic Bradu	0–5	Inter Clinceni
Unirea Brânceni	0–2	Ștefănești
Arsenal Malu	2–1	Metaloglobus București
Dunărea Călărași	4–2	Afumați
Valea Ursului	1–1 (a.e.t.) (5–4 p)	Argeșul Pitești
Voința Snagov	9–3	Juventus București
Gloria Popești-Leordeni	1–3	Balotești
Viitorul Buzău	1–1 (a.e.t.) (4–2 p)	Avântul Conpet Cireșu
Csikszereda Miercurea Ciuc	1–2	Avântul Reghin
Granitul Babadag	3–2	Callatis Mangalia
Victoria Țăndărei	0–1	Viitorul Axintele
Young Stars Panciu	2–0	Oțelul Galați II
Sepsi OSK	3–0	Zagon
Dinamo Onești	0–1	Aerostar Bacău
Voința Ion Creangă	3–1	Petrotub Roman
TransDor Tudora	3–4	Kosarom Pașcani
Rapid Dumești	0–2	Știința Miroslava
Progresul Frătăuții Vechi	0–1	Cetatea Târgu Neamț
Gloria II Bistrița	0–1	Arieșul Turda
Speranța Biertan	0–3	Metalurgistul Cugir
Vulturii Lugoj	1–2	Caransebeș
Sânmartin	3–0	Oșorhei
Sportul Șimleu Silvaniei	1–3	Unirea Jucu
Someșul Oar	1–6	FCM Baia Mare
UTA Bătrâna Doamnă	3–2	Național Sebiș
Politehnica Timișoara	1–2	Becicherecu Mic
Minerul Anina	1–6	Minerul Motru
Minerul Valea Copcii Mehedinți	4–5	Știința Turceni
Retezatul Hațeg	1–3 (a.e.t.)	Hunedoara
Flacăra Horezu	0–1	Pandurii II Târgu Jiu
Milcov	8–1	Sportul Vișina Nouã
Dinamo II București	w/o	Sportul Studențesc București
Ineu	w/o	UTA Arad
Podari	w/o	FC U Craiova

== Third round ==
All matches will be played on the 13 August 2014

Team 1	Score	Team 2
13 August 2014
Voința Ion Creangă	1–4	Cetatea Târgu Neamț
Avântul Reghin	0–2	Arieșul Turda
Sânmartin	2–0	Ineu
Hunedoara	1–1 (a.e.t.) (4–3 p)	Metalurgistul Cugir
UTA Bătrâna Doamnă	3–0	Becicherecu Mic
Pandurii II Târgu Jiu	0–2	Caransebeș
Știinta Turceni	1–2	Minerul Motru
Milcov	5–3	Podari
Valea Ursului	4–6	Chindia Târgoviște
Arsenal Malu	0–1	Ștefănești
Viitorul Axintele	3–1	Balotești
Viitorul Buzău	1–3	Dinamo II București
Voința Snagov	5–6	Inter Clinceni
Granitul Babadag	0–1	Dunărea Călărași
Young Stars Panciu	2–2 (a.e.t.) (4–5 p)	Aerostar Bacău
Kosarom Pașcani	0–1	Știința Miroslava
Inter Cristian	3–2	Sepsi OSK
Unirea Jucu	3–1	FCM Baia Mare

== Fourth round ==
All matches will be played on the 26 August 2014

Team 1	Score	Team 2
26 August 2014
Arieșul Turda	2–0	Hunedoara
Milcov	1–7	Chindia Târgoviște
Cetatea Târgu Neamț	2–0	Dorohoi
Inter Clinceni	1–3	Voluntari
Inter Cristian	0–1	Unirea Tărlungeni
Minerul Motru	0–2	Caransebeș
Sânmartin	1–2 (a.e.t.)	Bihor Oradea
Dinamo II București	0–1	Ștefănești
Dunărea Călărași	1–1 (a.e.t.) (3–4 p)	Viitorul Axintele
Știința Miroslava	0–3	Rapid CFR Suceava
UTA Bătrâna Doamnă	1–3 (a.e.t.)	Șoimii Pâncota
Aerostar Bacău	w/o	Vaslui
Farul Constanța	w/o	Dunărea Galați
Unirea Jucu	w/o	Gloria Bistrița
Fortuna Poiana Câmpina	w/o	Corona Brașov

== Fifth Round ==
All matches will be played on the 9 September 2014

Team 1	Score	Team 2
9 September 2014
Cetatea Târgu Neamț	0–1	Rapid CFR Suceava
Arieșul Turda	0–1 (a.e.t.)	Bihor Oradea
Chindia Târgoviște	2–1 (a.e.t.)	Academica Argeș Pitești
Caransebeș	1–1 (a.e.t.) (8–7 p)	Metalul Reșița
Șoimii Pâncota	3–2	Poli Timișoara
Farul Constanța	1–3 (a.e.t.)	Săgeata Năvodari
Fortuna Poiana Câmpina	3–0	Unirea Tărlungeni
Voluntari	1–2	Mioveni
Ștefănești	2–3	Berceni
Gloria Buzău	0–1	Brăila
Viitorul Axintele	3–3 (a.e.t.) (3–1 p)	Unirea Slobozia
Aerostar Bacău	0–5	Bacău
Olt Slatina	1–1 (a.e.t.) (2–4 p)	Râmnicu Vâlcea
Unirea Jucu	2–2 (a.e.t.) (4–3 p)	Olimpia Satu Mare

== Round of 32 ==
All matches will be played on the 23, 24 and 25 September 2014

Team 1	Score	Team 2
23/24/25 September 2014
Mioveni	3–1	Astra Giurgiu
Viitorul Axintele	0–2	CFR Cluj
Berceni	0–3	Steaua București
Unirea Jucu	0–3	Petrolul Ploiești
Fortuna Poiana Câmpina	2–5 (a.e.t.)	Dinamo București
Șoimii Pâncota	1–2	Pandurii Târgu Jiu
Săgeata Năvodari	0–3	Viitorul Constanța
Caransebeș	1–2	Universitatea Craiova
Bihor Oradea	1–1 (a.e.t.) (4–5 p)	Universitatea Cluj
Brăila	0–1	Oțelul Galați
Bacău	1–5 (a.e.t.)	Ceahlăul Piatra Neamț
Chindia Târgoviște	1–3	Brașov
Rapid CFR Suceava	1–0 (a.e.t.)	Gaz Metan Mediaș
Râmnicu Vâlcea	0–1	CSMS Iași
Rapid București	0–0 (a.e.t.) (5–4 p)	Botoșani
Târgu Mureș	4–1	Concordia Chiajna

=== Results ===
23 September 2014	Șoimii Pâncota	1–2	Pandurii Târgu Jiu	Pâncota
16:00	Băd 31'		Mevlja 22'; Suciu 84' (o.g.)	Stadium: Pâncota; Referee: Marcu Florin Mihai

23 September 2014	Brăila	0–1	Oțelul Galați	Brăila
16:00			Jula 57'	Stadium: Municipal; Referee: Florin Chivulete

23 September 2014	Rapid CFR Suceava	1–0 (a.e.t.)	Gaz Metan Mediaș	Suceava
16:00	Negru 103'			Stadium: Areni; Referee: Horaţiu Feşnic

23 September 2014	Râmnicu Vâlcea	0–1	CSMS Iași	Râmnicu Vâlcea
16:00			Dedu 2'	Stadium: Municipal; Referee: Adrian Illyes

23 September 2014	Rapid București	0–0 (a.e.t.) (5–4 p)	Botoșani	București
18:30				Stadium: Giulești-Valentin Stănescu; Referee: Florin Miron
	Penalties
	Coman (penalty scored); Iacob (penalty scored); Buș (penalty scored); Tânc (penalty scored); Vasile (penalty scored)		Fülöp (penalty scored); Ngadeu (penalty scored); Bordeianu (penalty scored); Browne (penalty scored); Ianc (penalty missed)

23 September 2014	Târgu Mureș	4–1	Concordia Chiajna	Târgu Mureș
20:30	Axente 27', 66'; Amauri 36'; N'Doye 43'		Dyulgerov 5'	Stadium: Trans-Sil; Referee: Popa Cătălin

24 September 2014	Viitorul Axintele	0–2	CFR Cluj	Axintele
16:00			Doré 26', 35'	Stadium: Stadionul Viitorul

24 September 2014	Chindia Târgoviște	1–3	Brașov	Târgoviște
16:00	Pătru 62'		Ganea 31'; Diogo 43'; Popa 73'	Stadium: Eugen Popescu

24 September 2014	Bacău	1–5 (a.e.t.)	Ceahlăul Piatra Neamț	Bacău
16:00	Căinari 68'		Marc 90+4'; Pavel 91'; Popadiuc 99', 103', 111'	Stadium: Municipal

24 September 2014	Unirea Jucu	0–3	Petrolul Ploiești	Cluj-Napoca
18:30			Astafei 24', 56'; N'Koyi 31'	Stadium: Cluj Arena; Attendance: 1,800; Referee: Florin Andrei

24 September 2014	Fortuna Poiana Câmpina	2–5 (a.e.t.)	Dinamo București	Ploiești
20:30	Cioinac 51'; Munteanu 71'		Rotariu 62', 63', 111'; Biliński 91', 96'	Stadium: Ilie Oană; Referee: Paul Unimatan

25 September 2014	Bihor Oradea	1–1 (a.e.t.) (4–5 p)	Universitatea Cluj	Oradea
16:00	Sorian 86'		Boutadjine 57'	Stadium: Iuliu Bodola; Attendance: 4,000; Referee: Denis Haidiner (Hunedoara)
	Penalties
	Lazăr (penalty scored); Lukács (penalty scored); Letan (penalty scored); Sorian (penalty missed); Dobrescu (penalty scored)		Mușat (penalty scored); Ceppelini (penalty scored); Lungu (penalty scored); Ciupe (penalty scored); Boutadjine (penalty scored)

25 September 2014	Caransebeș	1–2	Universitatea Craiova	Caransebeș
16:00	Lupu 25'		Goșa 19' (o.g.); Ferfelea 70'	Stadium: Balta Sărată

25 September 2014	Săgeata Năvodari	0–3	Viitorul Constanța	Năvodari
16:00			Neacșa 33'; Nedelcu 62'; Ursu 67' (o.g.)	Stadium: Flacăra

25 September 2014	Mioveni	3–1	Astra Giurgiu	Piteşti
18:00	Stoica 19'; Al. Popa 42'; Vintilă 90'		Cristescu 17'	Stadium: Nicolae Dobrin

25 September 2014	Berceni	0–3	Steaua București	Berceni
20:30			Iancu 75', 90', 90+3'	Stadium: Berceni

== Round of 16 ==
All matches will be played on 28, 29 and 30 October 2014

Team 1	Score	Team 2
28/29/30 October 2014
Mioveni	1–0	Dinamo București
Rapid CFR Suceava	2–3	Petrolul Ploiești
Rapid București	1–2	CFR Cluj
CSMS Iași	0–1	Steaua București
Oțelul Galați	2–3 (a.e.t.)	Pandurii Târgu Jiu
Târgu Mureș	4–0	Ceahlăul Piatra Neamț
Universitatea Craiova	2–1 (a.e.t.)	Viitorul Constanța
Brașov	1–3	Universitatea Cluj

=== Results ===
28 October 2014	Mioveni	1–0	Dinamo București	Pitești
18:00	Ayza 23'			Stadium: Nicolae Dobrin; Referee: Marian Balazs

28 October 2014	CSMS Iași	0–1	Steaua București	Iași
20:30			Stanciu 89'	Stadium: Emil Alexandrescu; Referee: Mircea Feșnic

29 October 2014	Târgu Mureș	4–0	Ceahlăul Piatra Neamț	Târgu Mureș
18:00	Gorobsov 45'; Henrique 47'; Hora 53'; Bumba 77'			Stadium: Trans-Sil; Attendance: Dragoș Istrate

29 October 2014	Universitatea Craiova	2–1 (a.e.t.)	Viitorul Constanța	Craiova
18:00	Băluță 54'; Mateiu 112'		Țîru 90+2'	Stadium: Ion Oblemenco

29 October 2014	Brașov	1–3	Universitatea Cluj	Brașov
20:30	Machado 27'		Lemnaru 18'; Ceppelini 21', 45+1'	Stadium: Silviu Ploeșteanu

30 October 2014	Oțelul Galați	2–3 (a.e.t.)	Pandurii Târgu Jiu	Galați
16:00	I. Popa 11'; Cristea 41'		Predescu 12'; Erico 88'; Élton 93'	Stadium: Oțelul

30 October 2014	Rapid CFR Suceava	2–3	Petrolul Ploiești	Botoșani
18:00	Matei 56'; Golofca 69'		Ipša 27'; Velescu 57' (o.g.); Haddad 60'	Stadium: Municipal

30 October 2014	Rapid București	1–2	CFR Cluj	Bucharest
20:30	Pancu 10'		Doré 79'; Chanturia 87'	Stadium: Giulești-Valentin Stănescu

== Quarter-finals ==
2 December 2014	Mioveni	3–4	CFR Cluj	Nicolae Dobrin, Pitești
20:30	Stoica 37'; Nilă 51'; Gălan 59'		Tadé 62'; Chanturia 68'; Ivanovski 87'; Ivanovski 90+1'	Referee: Dragoș Istrate (București)

3 December 2014	Universitatea Cluj	1–0	Pandurii Târgu Jiu	Cluj Arena, Cluj-Napoca
20:30	Ceppelini 55'			Referee: Cristian Balaj (Baia Mare)

4 December 2014	ASA Târgu Mureș	0–1	Petrolul Ploiești	Trans-Sil, Târgu Mureș
18:00			Albín 88'	Referee: Ovidiu Hațegan (Arad)

4 December 2014	Universitatea Craiova	0–1	Steaua București	Ion Oblemenco, Craiova
20:30			Rusescu 69'	Attendance: 25,000; Referee: Alexandru Tudor (București)

== Semi-finals ==
Team 1	Agg.	Team 2	1st leg	2nd leg
CFR Cluj	0–0	Universitatea Cluj	0–0 (2–4 p)	0–0
Petrolul Ploiești	2–4	Steaua București	1–1	1–3

=== 1st leg ===
4 March 2015	CFR Cluj	0–0	Universitatea Cluj	Cluj-Napoca
21:30				Stadium: Dr. Constantin Rădulescu; Attendance: 4,000; Referee: Robert Dumitru (Brașov)

5 March 2015	Petrolul Ploiești	1–1	Steaua București	Ploiești
21:30	Tchité 22'		Chipciu 90+4'	Stadium: Ilie Oană; Attendance: 7,500; Referee: Adrian Comănescu (Râmnicu Vâlcea)

=== 2nd leg ===
1 April 2015	Universitatea Cluj	0–0 (0–0 agg.) (4–2 p)	CFR Cluj	Cluj-Napoca
21:30				Stadium: Cluj Arena; Attendance: 9,533; Referee: Marius Avram
	Penalties
	Ciupe (penalty scored); Lungu (penalty scored); Castillion (penalty scored); Cristocea (penalty scored)		Doré (penalty scored); Larie (penalty missed); Chanturia (penalty scored); Petrucci (penalty missed)

2 April 2015	Steaua București	3–1 (4–2 agg.)	Petrolul Ploiești	București
21:30	Ad. Popa 20'; Iancu 32'; Tănase 68'		Ipša 70'	Stadium: Arena Națională; Attendance: 14,206; Referee: George Găman

== Final ==
31 May 2015	Universitatea Cluj	0–3	Steaua București	Bucharest
21:00		Report; Report 2	Popa 9', 53'; Rusescu 48'	Stadium: Arena Națională; Attendance: 37,764; Referee: Alexandru Tudor; Assistant referees: Valentin Avram, Vladimir Urzică; Fourth official: Ciprian Danșa; Goal-line assistants: George Găman, Iulian Călin
