= Văduva =

Văduva is a Romanian surname. Notable people with the surname include:

- Ilie Văduva (1934–1998), Romanian politician
- Leontina Vaduva (born 1960), Romanian opera singer
- Robert Văduva (born 1992), Romanian footballer
