= Jérôme Scolan =

French footballer (born 1988)

Personal information
- Date of birth: 27 June 1988 (age 38)
- Place of birth: Toulon, France
- Height: 1.80 m (5 ft 11 in)
- Position: Goalkeeper

Team information
- Current team: Hyères
- Number: 1

Senior career*
Years	Team	Apps	(Gls)
2007–2008	Toulon	23	(0)
2008–2013	Raon-l'Étape	126	(0)
2013–2015	Clermont	2	(0)
2013–2015	Clermont B	13	(0)
2017–	Hyères	52	(0)
- * Club domestic league appearances and goals as of 16:08, 24 April 2022 (UTC)

Jérôme Scolan (born 27 June 1988) is a French professional footballer who plays as a goalkeeper for Championnat National 1 club Hyères.

== Club career ==
After making his debut in the French lower divisions, Scolan joined Clermont in 2013, as a backup for Fabien Farnolle. He made his full professional debut in a 2–0 Ligue 2 victory over CA Bastia in December 2013.
