= Hintze Ribeiro Bridge collapse =

2001 bridge collapse in Portugal

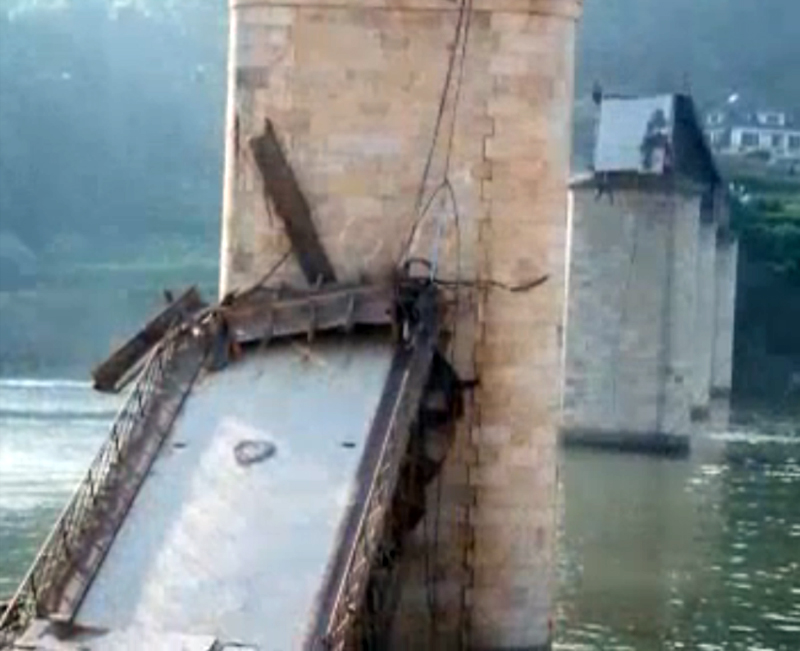
- The bridge after the collapse
- Date: 4 March 2001
- Time: 21:15 (WEST)
- Location: Between Entre-os-Rios (municipality of Penafiel) and Castelo de Paiva, Portugal; 41°4′44″N 8°17′45″W
- Type: Bridge collapse
- Cause: Bridge scour
- Deaths: 59

The Hintze Ribeiro Bridge collapse, also known as the Entre-os-Rios tragedy (Portuguese: Tragédia de Entre-os-Rios), occurred in the evening of 4 March 2001, between Entre-os-Rios, in the municipality of Penafiel, and Castelo de Paiva, in northern Portugal. After days of heavy rain and flooding, one of the pillars of the Hintze Ribeiro Bridge, a 114-year-old bridge over the Douro river that had visible signs of degradation, collapsed due to scour, dragging with it part of the deck. One bus and three cars fell into the Douro river, killing a total of 59 people, of which the bodies of 36 were never recovered.

== Background ==
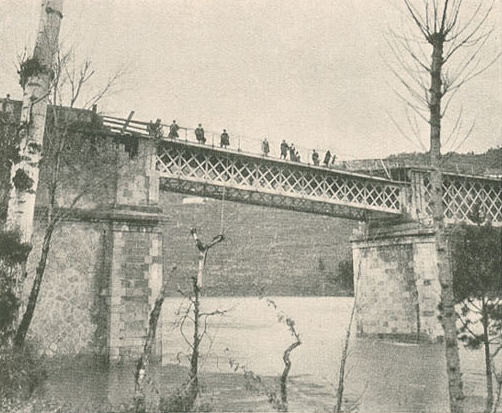
The bridge in 1919

The Hintze Ribeiro Bridge, also known as the Entre-os-Rios Bridge, was built over the Douro river between 1884 and 1886 to link the village of Entre-os-Rios to Castelo de Paiva. The bridge was named after Ernesto Hintze Ribeiro, President of the Council of Ministers of Portugal when the bridge was built.

The bridge structure consisted of six pillars, with only two permanently exposed to the flow and two others implanted on a sand deposit. With the increase in sand extraction (dredging) from the 1970s onward, the sand deposits around these two pillars began decreasing due to direct extraction, having almost disappeared by 1982, as reported in a survey carried out in that year.

An analysis of the technical documentation regarding the surveys of the bridge over time showed a lowering of the river bottom, next to the pillar that would collapse, of approximately 11.5 meters in the period from 1913 to 1982, and of 1.5 meters between 1982 and 1989.

Between November 2000 and March 2001, five major floods were registered in the Douro river, putting the river flow permanently at above 2000 m^{3}/s over a period of three months. This caused insufficient sediment deposit and a riverbed lowering of around 4 meters, on average, observed in the stretch of the river where the Hintze Ribeiro Bridge was located.

In the years prior to the disaster, the degradation of the bridge was noticeable and there were calls for a new bridge. In 1999, the President of the Municipality of Entre-os-Rios, Paulo Teixeira, said that "[they] hope that a tragedy is not necessary for a new bridge to be built". In January 2001, two months before the disaster, the local population demonstrated against the poor state of the bridge, demanding better road access.

== Disaster ==
On 4 March 2001, around 21:15, the fourth pillar of the Hintze Ribeiro Bridge collapsed, taking down the segments of the deck between the third and sixth pillars. A bus from the transportation company Asadouro with 53 passengers and three cars with six other people were crossing the bridge at that moment and fell into the river. There were no survivors.

Firefighters of Entre-os-Rios initiated a search and rescue operation minutes after the collapse.

== Aftermath ==
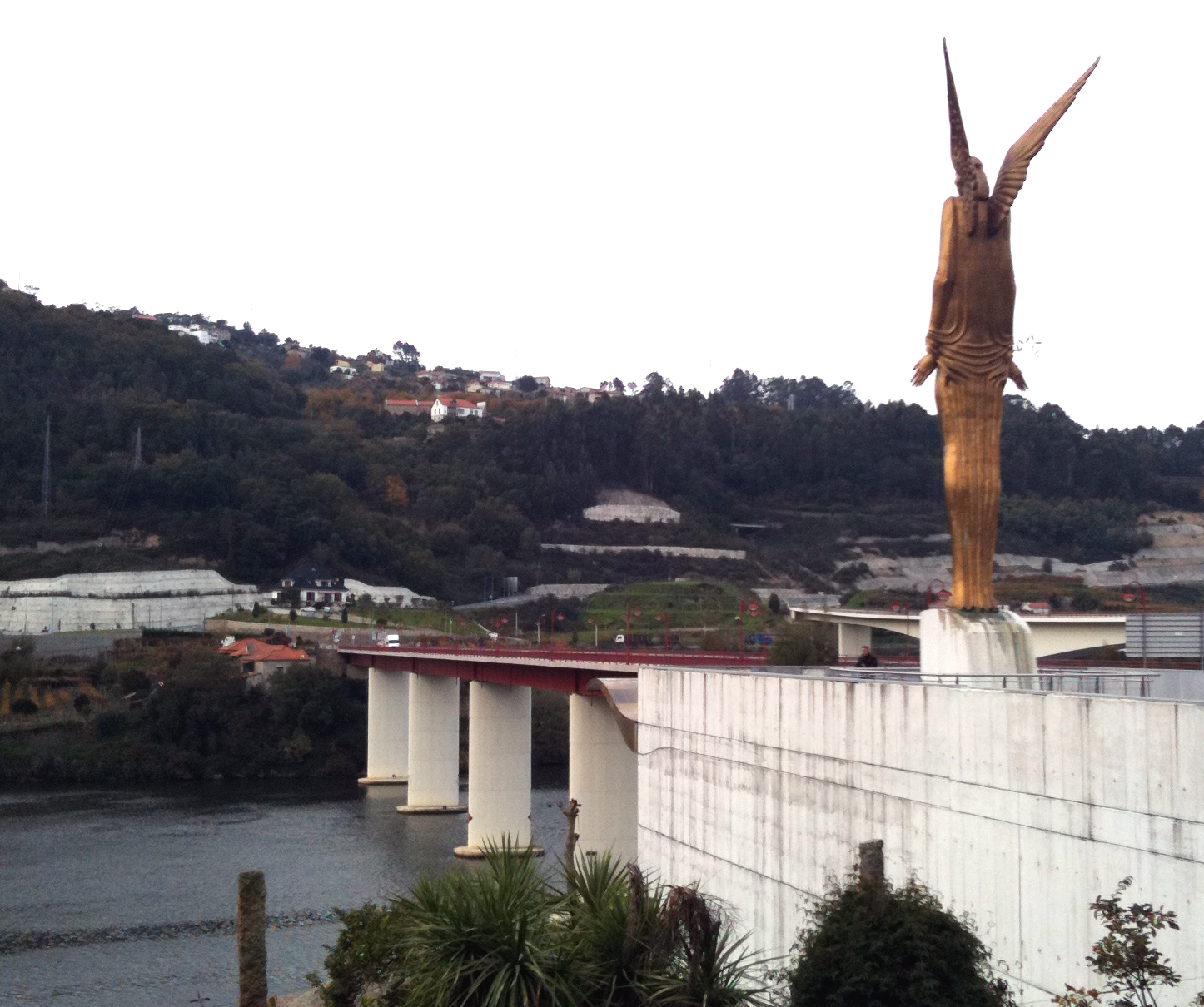
Memorial statue to the victims of the disaster, next to new Hintze Ribeiro Bridge

In the morning of 5 March, less than 24 hours after the disaster, the Portuguese Minister of Social Infrastructure Jorge Coelho resigned, claiming political responsibility for the disaster. Prime Minister António Guterres visited the location later that morning. Two days of national mourning were declared.

The strong river current carried the bodies of the victims downstream more than 30 kilometres to the Atlantic Ocean. Bodies were found inside the retrieved vehicles and on beaches of northern Portugal and the Spanish region of Galicia. The last body found was on 22 May 2001, 79 days after the disaster.

The Hintze Ribeiro Bridge had linked Castelo de Paiva, in the Aveiro District, and Entre-os-Rios, in the Porto District. After the loss of the bridge and until a new bridge was completed, residents of Castelo de Paiva had to travel an additional 70 kilometres to reach the Porto area.

Dismantlement of what remained of the original bridge was started in June 2001, and a new bridge was built, 7 metres upstream of the original. In May 2002, the new bridge, also named Hintze Ribeiro Bridge, was inaugurated.

A memorial monument to the victims of the disaster, named "Angel of Portugal" (Anjo de Portugal) was inaugurated in January 2003. The monument consists of a concrete plinth containing the names of all the victims, on top of which is a 12-metre tall bronze statue of an angel. The crypt and the statue have a combined height of 20 metres.

== See also ==
- Bridge scour
- List of bridge failures
