= Castelo de Paiva =

- Municipality
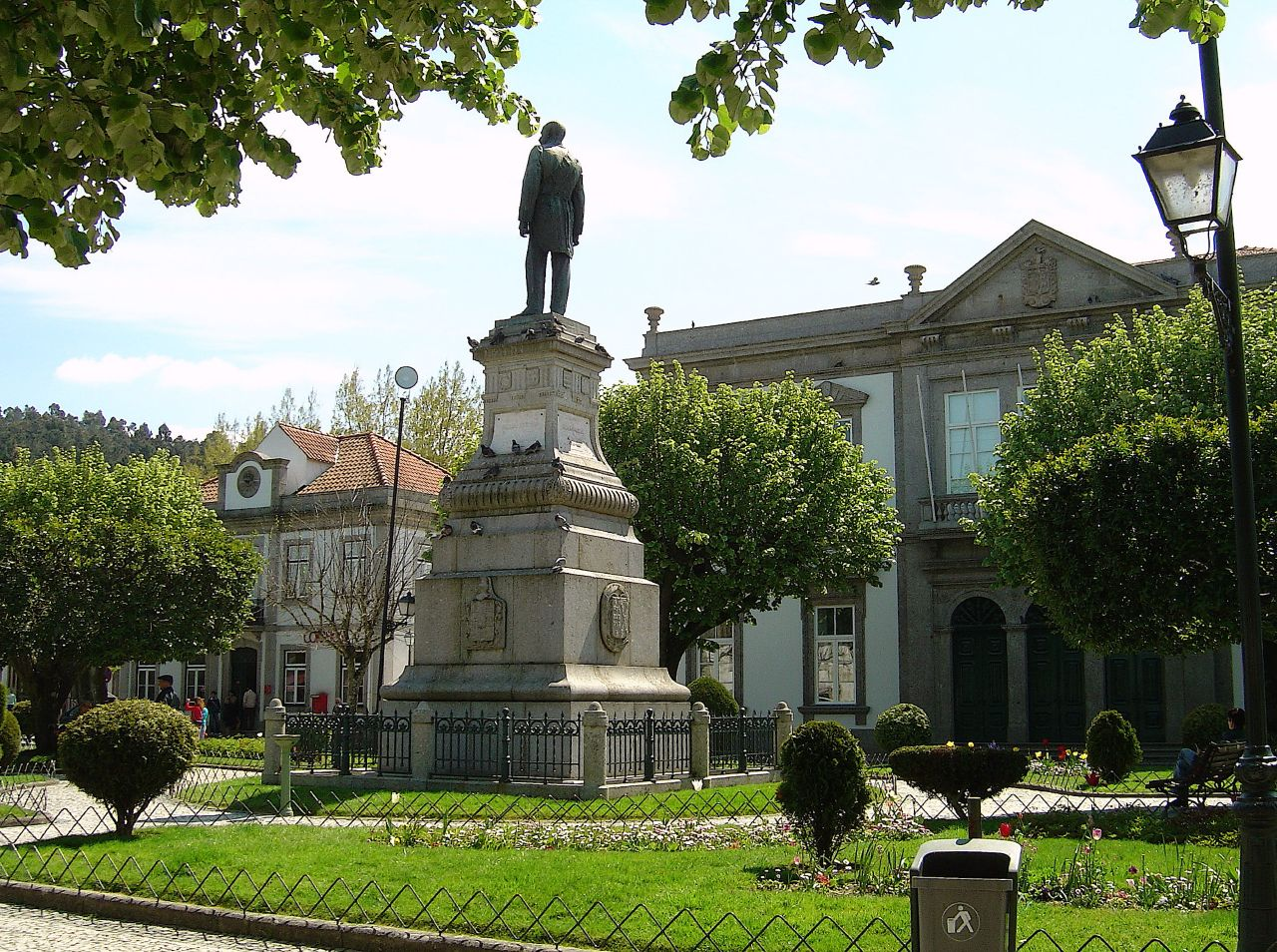

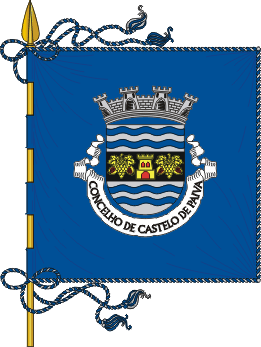
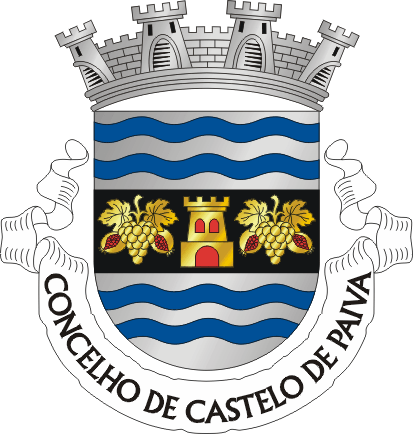
- Flag Coat of arms
- Interactive map of Castelo de Paiva
- Location in Portugal
- Coordinates: 41°04′N 8°15′W
- Country: Portugal
- Region: Norte
- Intermunic. comm.: Tâmega e Sousa
- District: Aveiro
- Parishes: 6

Government
  - President: Gonçalo Rocha (PS)

Area
  - Total: 115.01 km^{2} (44.41 sq mi)

Population (2011)
  - Total: 16,733
  - Density: 145.49/km^{2} (376.82/sq mi)
- Time zone: UTC+00:00 (WET)
  - Summer (DST): UTC+01:00 (WEST)
- Website: http://www.cm-castelo-paiva.pt/

Castelo de Paiva (Portuguese pronunciation: [kɐʃˈtɛlu ðɨ ˈpajvɐ]) is a town and a municipality of the Aveiro District in Portugal. The population in 2011 was 16,733, in an area of 115.01 km^{2}.

On 4 March 2001 at 9 pm, a 116-year-old metal bridge linking the parish/council of Sobrado (a.k.a. Castelo de Paiva) and Entre-os-Rios (a bridge connecting Castelo de Paiva to Penafiel) collapsed, killing 59 people, including those in a bus from the Asadouro company and three cars that were attempting to get to the other side of the Douro river. The Hintze Ribeiro Bridge disaster prompted accusations of government negligence, and the Public Works minister Jorge Coelho resigned shortly after the disaster. There is a monument near the bridge in honour of the people who died, known as the "Anjo de Portugal" (The Angel of Portugal).

The Mayor is Gonçalo Rocha, elected by the Socialist Party (PS). His term goes until 2021.

The municipal holiday is 24 June, Saint John's day.

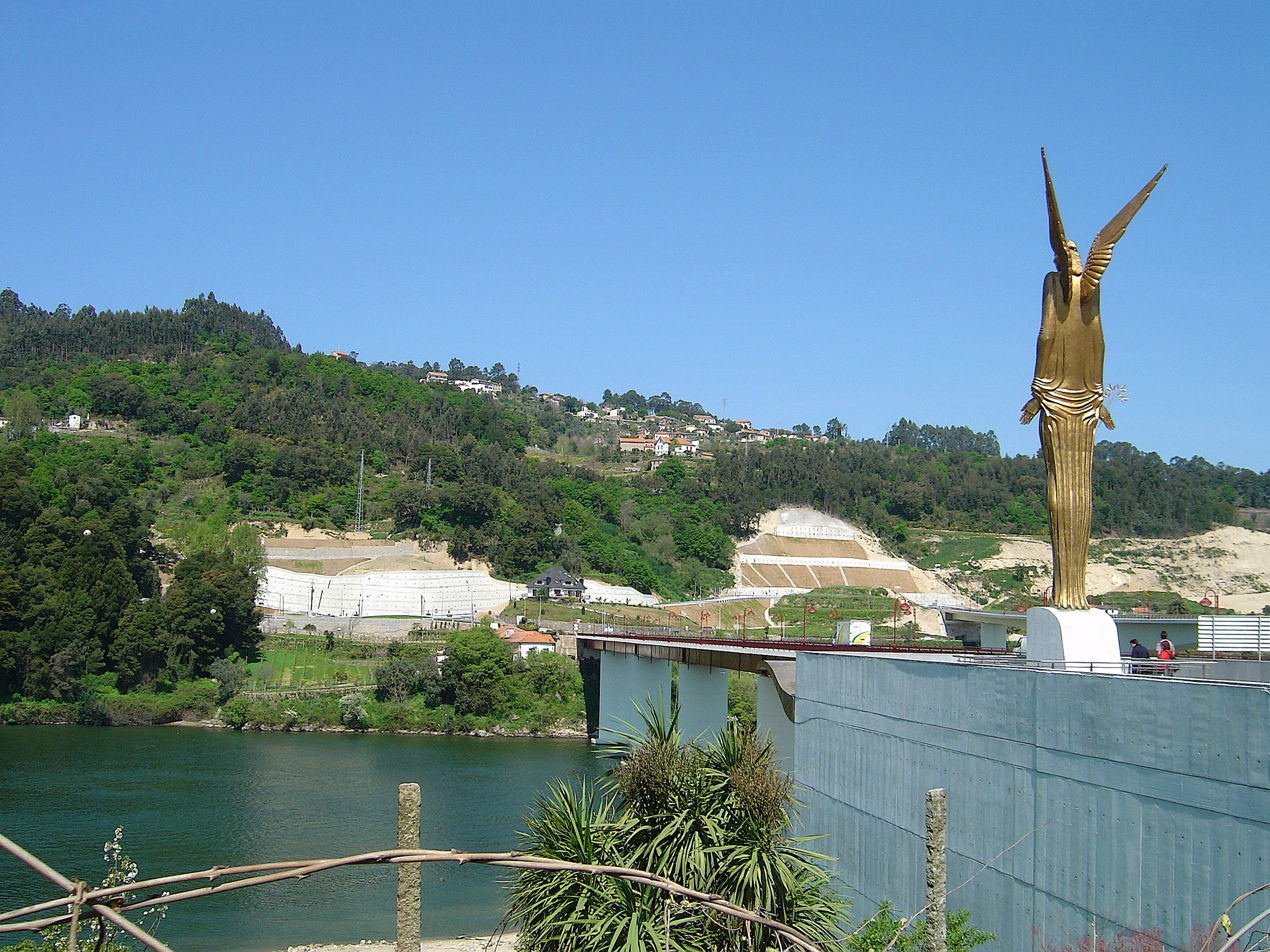
Monument in memory of the victims of the Hintze Ribeiro disaster in 2001

== Demographics ==
Population of Castelo de Paiva Municipality (1801–2004)
| 1801 | 1849 | 1900 | 1930 | 1960 | 1981 | 1991 | 2001 | 2011 |
| 6691 | 7586 | 9728 | 11450 | 17756 | 17026 | 16515 | 17338 | 16733 |

== Parishes ==
Administratively, the municipality is divided into 6 civil parishes (freguesias):

- Fornos
- Raiva, Pedorido e Paraíso
- Real
- Santa Maria de Sardoura
- São Martinho de Sardoura
- Sobrado e Bairros

== Points of interest ==
- Câmara Municipal (Municipal Palace)
- Largo do Conde (Cont's Square)
- Douro River
- Passadiços do Paiva (Paiva Walkways)
- Paiva River

== The Legend of Saint Anthony in Castelo de Paiva ==
Researchers, archeologists and journalists have found documents that proves the connection between Saint Anthony of Padua and Castelo de Paiva. His parents, Martim de Bulhões, and D. Teresa Taveira were born in this council.

== Other notable people ==
- José Nunes (born 1977) a Portuguese former footballer with 501 club caps
- Pedro Filipe Soares (born 1979) a Portuguese mathematician and politician
- Sérgio Fernando da Silva Rodrigues (born 1985) known as Serginho, is a Portuguese footballer with over 300 club caps
- Marco Pereira (born 1987) known as Marco, a Portuguese footballer with over 330 club caps
