= Mirza Hasanović =

Bosnian-Herzegovinian footballer

Personal information
- Date of birth: 16 September 1990 (age 36)
- Place of birth: Zvornik, SFR Yugoslavia
- Height: 1.92 m (6 ft 4 in)
- Position: Defensive midfielder

Senior career*
Years	Team	Apps	(Gls)
2012–2013	Sloboda Tuzla	12	(2)
2013	Turnu Severin	11	(1)
2013–2014	Dinamo București	0	(0)
2015	Radnički Lukavac	0	(0)
2015–2016	Ängebäck BK		
2016	IFK Ås/ Åmotfors		
2016–2020	SpVgg Osterhofen	51	(10)
- * Club domestic league appearances and goals as of 5 March 2021

Mirza Hasanović (born 16 September 1990) is a Bosnian-Herzegovinian footballer who plays as a defensive midfielder.
