= Antonio Asanović =

Croatian footballer (born 1991)

Personal information
- Date of birth: 9 August 1991 (age 35)
- Place of birth: Cannes, France
- Height: 1.96 m (6 ft 5 in)
- Positions: Central defender; defensive midfielder

Youth career
- 2001–2010: Hajduk Split

Senior career*
Years	Team	Apps	(Gls)
2011	Primorac	15	(1)
2011–2012	Hajduk Split	0	(0)
2011–2012	→ Primorac (loan)	47	(3)
2013	Turnu Severin	13	(0)
2013–2014	Dinamo București	2	(0)
2013	→ Corona Brașov (loan)	10	(0)
2015	Senec	12	(0)
2015–2016	DAC Dunajská Streda	11	(0)
2017	Ionikos Nikaias		
2017	Hrvace	7	(0)
2018	NK Pajde Möhlin	25	(8)
2019–2020	ViOn Zlaté Moravce	38	(1)
2020–2021	Senica	9	(0)
2022–2023	Šibenik	6	(0)
- * Club domestic league appearances and goals as of 20 May 2022

Antonio Asanović (born 9 August 1991) is a Croatian professional footballer who plays as a central defender. He also plays futsal.

He is the son of Aljoša Asanović. He can also play in the position of defensive midfielder.

== Club career ==
Antonio Asanović passed through the youth ranks of Hajduk Split, playing primarily as an offensive midfielder. He finished his first senior season with NK Primorac 1929. Reinvented as a centre back in Stobreč, he received a stipend contract with Hajduk, remaining on a season-long loan in Primorac, which became Hajduk's reserve team. The termination of his contract came at the beginning of the 2012–2013 season by mutual agreement. After a trial with Valenciennes, on 11 January 2013, he signed a 6-month contract with the Romanian Liga I club Turnu Severin., where he would become a permanent fixture until the end of the season, which saw the club's relegation.
