= José Nunes =

Portuguese footballer (born 1977)

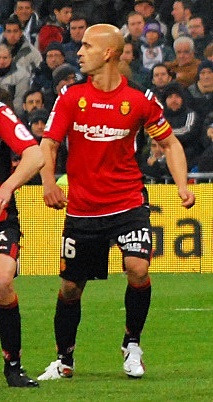
- Nunes with Mallorca in 2011

Personal information
- Full name: José Carlos de Araújo Nunes
- Date of birth: 7 March 1977 (age 49)
- Place of birth: Castelo de Paiva, Portugal
- Height: 1.85 m (6 ft 1 in)
- Position: Centre-back

Youth career
- 1988–1989: Sporting Paivense
- 1989–1994: Cinfães
- 1994–1996: Sporting Paivense

Senior career*
Years	Team	Apps	(Gls)
1996–1997	Ovarense	26	(1)
1997–2001	Maia	103	(2)
2001–2002	Salgueiros	20	(0)
2002–2004	Gil Vicente	61	(1)
2004–2005	Braga	48	(1)
2006–2014	Mallorca	243	(13)
Total		501	(18)

International career
1997–1998	Portugal U20	5	(0)
- * Club domestic league appearances and goals

José Carlos de Araújo Nunes (born 7 March 1977) is a Portuguese former professional footballer who played as a central defender.

He amassed Primeira Liga totals of 129 games and two goals over five seasons, representing Salgueiros, Gil Vicente and Braga. He spent most of his career, however, with Mallorca in Spain, signing in 2006 and appearing in 258 official matches in eight La Liga campaigns.

== Club career ==
Born in Castelo de Paiva, Aveiro District, Nunes began his professional career with modest clubs in the second and third divisions. He made his Primeira Liga debut in the 2001–02 season, with soon-to-be-extinct S.C. Salgueiros.

After two solid seasons with Gil Vicente FC, Nunes signed with fellow top-flight side S.C. Braga in July 2004, moving in January 2006 to Spain's La Liga with RCD Mallorca. He made his debut for his new team on the 29th, starting in a 0–3 home loss to FC Barcelona and adding four league goals in his first full campaign in the Balearic Islands.

An undisputed starter from his arrival – he was also awarded captaincy early on– Nunes continued to figure prominently in 2009–10 as Mallorca won their first ten home league games of the season, with the player scoring twice, although one of those came in the 4–2 defeat at Barcelona. Eventually, he netted four times in 34 matches, and the club achieved a fifth place in the table (fourth until the last minute of the last round).

Nunes suffered a serious knee injury in a friendly with SSC Napoli in mid-August 2011, initially being sidelined for seven months but recovering in less than four. He still contributed two goals in 14 appearances during the campaign, helping Mallorca to finish eighth.
