= Maximiliano Giusti =

Argentine footballer

Maxi Giusti
Personal information
- Full name: Maximiliano Jorge Giusti
- Date of birth: 18 February 1991
- Place of birth: San Nicolás, Buenos Aires, Argentina
- Date of death: 8 October 2016 (aged 25)
- Height: 1.80 m (5 ft 11 in)
- Position: Centre forward

Youth career
- –2007: Fútbol San Nicolás
- 2007–2011: Vélez Sársfield

Senior career*
Years	Team	Apps	(Gls)
2011–2014	Vélez Sársfield	5	(0)
2011	→ Audax Italiano (loan)	5	(0)
2012	→ Almagro (loan)	16	(1)
2012	→ Guaraní Antonio Franco (loan)	11	(0)
2013	→ Universidad San Martín (loan)	32	(8)
2014	Pandurii Târgu Jiu	7	(2)
2015	León de Huánuco	11	(8)
2015–2016	Universitario de Deportes	11	(2)
2016	Mushuc Runa	7	(1)
2016	La Emilia	0	(0)
- * Club domestic league appearances and goals as of 9 October 2016

Maximiliano Jorge Giusti (18 February 1991 – 8 October 2016) was an Argentine football centre forward. At the time of his death, he played for Mushuc Runa in the Ecuadorian Serie A.

== Career ==
Giusti debuted in the Argentine Primera División playing for Vélez Sársfield on a 6–34 defeat to All Boys for the second fixture of the 2011 Clausura. He had already played however in the team's 2011 Copa Libertadores debut, 3–0 over Caracas FC, when he entered the field to replace injured Guillermo Franco. On his first season with the first team, he helped Vélez to win the Argentine championship playing 5 games, and also played 3 in the team's Copa Libertadores semi-finalist campaign.

For the start of the 2011–12 season, Giusti was loaned to Audax Italiano of the Chilean Primera División.

== Honours ==
Vélez Sársfield

- Argentine Primera División (1): 2011 Clausura
