= Gelu Velici =

Romanian footballer

Personal information
- Full name: Gelu Miodrag Velici
- Date of birth: 22 April 1992 (age 34)
- Place of birth: Timișoara, Romania
- Height: 1.85 m (6 ft 1 in)
- Position: Striker

Team information
- Current team: Peciu Nou
- Number: 99

Youth career
- Politehnica Timișoara

Senior career*
Years	Team	Apps	(Gls)
2011–2012	FC Politehnica II		
2012–2014	Ceahlăul Piatra Neamț	16	(2)
2014	Dinamo București	7	(0)
2014	→ Fortuna Poiana Câmpina	4	(0)
2015–2016	Național Sebiș		
2016	Cetate Deva	9	(3)
2017	Național Sebiș	8	(3)
2017	Dunărea Călărași	1	(0)
2017–2018	Lugoj	26	(20)
2018–2019	Politehnica Timișoara	16	(3)
2019	Cigánd	7	(3)
2019	CSM Reșița	11	(0)
2020	Ghiroda	10	(1)
2021	Crișul Chișineu-Criș	6	(4)
2021	Dunărea Călărași	2	(0)
2021–2023	Viitorul Șimian	35	(36)
2023–2024	Jiul Petroșani	5	(8)
2024–	Peciu Nou	9	(2)

International career^{‡}
2012–2013	Romania U21	2	(0)
- * Club domestic league appearances and goals as of 17:49, 5 January 2025 (UTC) ‡ National team caps and goals as of 17:49, 5 January 2025 (UTC)

Gelu Miodrag Velici (born 22 April 1992) is a Romanian footballer who plays as a striker for CSC Peciu Nou.
