= Wanderson (footballer, born 1990) =

Brazilian footballer

Personal information
- Full name: Wanderson Miranda Francisco
- Date of birth: 8 February 1990 (age 36)
- Place of birth: Santo Amaro, Brazil
- Height: 1.78 m (5 ft 10 in)
- Position: Midfielder

Team information
- Current team: CCD Santa Eulália

Youth career
- 2008: Criciúma
- 2008–2009: Braga

Senior career*
Years	Team	Apps	(Gls)
2009–2010	Dravinja		
2010	Videira		
2010–2011	Terrassa	7	(0)
2011–2012	Vizela	22	(2)
2012–2013	Braga	0	(0)
2012–2013	→ Ribeirão (loan)	1	(0)
2013	Panachaiki	22	(4)
2013–2014	Corona Brașov	26	(2)
2014	Dinamo București	5	(0)
2015–2016	União Madeira	2	(0)
2017	Limianos	2	(0)
2017	Değirmenlik	16	(11)
2017	Fafe	8	(0)
2017–2018	Lusitano VRSA	18	(1)
2018	CSMȘ Reșița		
2019	Gençler Birliği	16	(3)
2019	Berço	4	(0)
2019–2020	Operário	14	(4)
2020	Oliveira de Frandes	9	(2)
2021	Alcains	12	(0)
2021	Os Sandinenses	11	(1)
2022	Lusitano FCV	11	(0)
2022–2023	Carvalhais	21	(1)
2023	Lousada	5	(0)
2023–	CCD Santa Eulália	1	(0)
- * Club domestic league appearances and goals as of 23:29, 12 December 2023 (UTC)

Wanderson Miranda Francisco (born 8 February 1990), known simply as Wanderson, is a Brazilian professional footballer who plays as a midfielder for AF Braga Honour Division club CCD Santa Eulália.
