= Alexandre Durimel =

French footballer (born 1990)

Personal information
- Full name: Alexandre Benjamin Durimel
- Date of birth: 16 March 1990 (age 36)
- Place of birth: Paris, France
- Height: 1.90 m (6 ft 3 in)
- Position: Centre-back

Team information
- Current team: Stade Poitevin
- Number: 3

Youth career
- 1999–2002: Issy-les-Moulineaux FC
- 2002–2004: Lens
- 2004–2010: Amiens

Senior career*
Years	Team	Apps	(Gls)
2010–2012	Amiens	15	(0)
2012–2013	Turnu Severin	17	(0)
2013–2015	Dinamo București	24	(0)
2015–2016	CA Bastia	28	(0)
2016–2017	Sedan	17	(1)
2017–2018	Chambly	11	(0)
2018–2020	Bastia-Borgo	43	(7)
2020–2021	Gazélec Ajaccio	8	(0)
2021–2022	Andrézieux	23	(1)
2022–	Stade Poitevin	81	(11)
- * Club domestic league appearances and goals as of 4 December 2025

Alexandre Durimel (born 16 March 1990) is a French professional footballer who plays as a centre-back for Championnat National 1 club Stade Poitevin.
