= Rashid Browne =

Dutch professional footballer

Personal information
- Full name: Rashid Hesus Grigorio Browne
- Date of birth: 28 September 1993 (age 33)
- Place of birth: Rotterdam, Netherlands
- Height: 1.71 m (5 ft 7 1/2 in)
- Position: Winger

Youth career
- Spartaan '20
- Sparta

Senior career*
Years	Team	Apps	(Gls)
2012−2014	Almere City	42	(3)
2014−2015	Botoșani	8	(0)
2017−2018	Excelsior Maassluis	6	(0)
2018−2019	Valmiera	10	(0)
2020−2021	Asarums		
2021	Doxa Drama		
2022	Poros		
2023−2024	Scheveningen		
2024−2025	SHO		

International career
2009	Netherlands U16	2	(0)
- * Club domestic league appearances and goals as of 14:51, 4 June 2019 (UTC)

Rashid Browne (born 28 September 1993 in Rotterdam) is a Dutch retired footballer who played as a winger.

== Club career ==
Browne came through the Sparta Rotterdam youth system and joined Almere City in 2012. He left Romanian side Botoșani in January 2016.

He later played in Greece and for amateur sides Scheveningen and SHO.

== International career ==
Browne played 2 games for the Netherlands national under-16 football team
