= Serginho (footballer, born 1985) =

Portuguese footballer

Personal information
- Full name: Sérgio Fernando da Silva Rodrigues
- Date of birth: 12 October 1985 (age 41)
- Place of birth: Castelo de Paiva, Portugal
- Height: 1.80 m (5 ft 11 in)
- Position: Left back

Team information
- Current team: Lusitânia

Youth career
- 1996–1997: Lobão
- 1998–2001: Feirense
- 2001–2002: Porto
- 2002–2004: Feirense

Senior career*
Years	Team	Apps	(Gls)
2004–2009	Feirense	78	(2)
2009–2010	Ermis	14	(0)
2010–2012	Freamunde	37	(2)
2012–2013	Santa Clara	40	(5)
2013–2014	Brașov	40	(2)
2015	Dinamo București	5	(0)
2015–2016	Feirense	37	(1)
2016–2017	Créteil	7	(0)
2018	Sanjoanense	14	(3)
2018–	Lusitânia	58	(0)
- * Club domestic league appearances and goals as of 20 September 2020

Sérgio Fernando da Silva Rodrigues (born 12 October 1985), commonly known as Serginho, is a Portuguese footballer who plays as a left back for Lusitânia FC.

== Club career ==
Born in Castelo de Paiva, Aveiro District, Serginho played almost exclusively in the second division in his country, representing C.D. Feirense, S.C. Freamunde and C.D. Santa Clara. Abroad, he started appearing for Cyprus' Ermis Aradippou FC and FC Brașov in Romania.

In February 2015, Serginho signed a one-and-a-half-year contract with FC Dinamo București. He left after only four months, however, returning to both his country and Feirense.

In the summer of 2016, Serginho joined French club US Créteil-Lusitanos. He was released the following transfer window.
