= Amauri (footballer, born 1982) =

Brazilian footballer

Personal information
- Full name: Amauri Morais Pereira
- Date of birth: 1 February 1982 (age 44)
- Place of birth: Rio de Janeiro, Brazil
- Height: 1.91 m (6 ft 3 in)
- Position: Forward

Senior career*
Years	Team	Apps	(Gls)
2003–2006	CFZ		
2007–2008	Bahia		
2009	Fluminense de Feira	9	(0)
2010	AD Confiança	3	(0)
2011–2012	Anapolina	7	(1)
2013	Brasília	2	(0)
2014	ASA Târgu Mureș	23	(7)
2017	União Barbarense	12	(0)
2019	Olímpico	3	(3)
2020–2021	America de Pedrinhas	5	(1)
Total		64	(12)
- * Club domestic league appearances and goals

Amauri Morais Pereira (born 1 February 1982), known simply as Amauri, is a Brazilian former professional footballer who played as a forward. In 2014 he had his only experience outside Brazil playing in Romania, first in Liga II, then in Liga I for ASA Târgu Mureș.
