= Pape N'Daw =

Senegalese footballer

Personal information
- Full name: Pape Abdoulaye N'Daw
- Date of birth: 26 October 1993 (age 33)
- Place of birth: Dakar, Senegal
- Height: 1.97 m (6 ft 6 in)
- Position: Striker

Senior career*
Years	Team	Apps	(Gls)
2012–2013	Niary Tally	9	(2)
2013	Dinamo București	4	(0)
2014	Niary Tally		
2015	Simba S.C.	8	(0)
2016	Township Rollers	2	(0)
2018	Persipura Jayapura	1	(0)
Total		24	(2)
- * Club domestic league appearances and goals as of 5 February 2023

Pape Abdoulaye N'Daw (born 26 October 1993) is a Senegalese former footballer who played as a forward.

== Career ==
N'Daw was born 26 October 1993 in Dakar, Senegal and began playing football at Niary Tally. He moved to Romania at age 19 to play for Dinamo București where he was seen as a new Lacina Traoré of Romanian football. He made his Liga I debut for The Red Dogs on 28 July 2013 under coach Gheorghe Mulțescu in a 2–0 victory against FC Vaslui. N'Daw played only four Liga I games for Dinamo, including an appearance in a derby against Steaua București. He returned to Niary Tally, then he went to play for Simba, Township Rollers and Persipura Jayapura, retiring from playing football at age 27, becoming a sports agent.
