= Elton Figueiredo =

Brazilian footballer (born 1986)

Personal information
- Full name: Elton Charles Figueiredo da Silva
- Date of birth: 12 February 1986 (age 40)
- Place of birth: Cuiabá, Brazil
- Height: 1.78 m (5 ft 10 in)
- Position: Midfielder

Team information
- Current team: Libolo

Youth career
- 2001–2006: Vitória

Senior career*
Years	Team	Apps	(Gls)
2011–2013	Vitória	25	(10)
2012	→ Comercial (loan)	5	(1)
2013	→ Santa Cruz-RS (loan)	10	(1)
2013–2014	Dinamo București	37	(2)
2015	Apollon Limassol	3	(0)
2015–2016	Skoda Xanthi	3	(0)
2016	Atlético Goianiense	0	(0)
2018	Luverdense	11	(0)
2019	Sergipe	0	(0)
2019–	Libolo		
- * Club domestic league appearances and goals as of 22:05, 29 December 2019 (UTC)

Elton Charles Figueiredo da Silva (born 12 February 1986), commonly known as Elton Figueiredo, is a Brazilian footballer who plays as a midfielder for C.R.D. Libolo.
