= Robert Văduva =

Romanian footballer

Personal information
- Full name: Robert Theodor Văduva
- Date of birth: 5 September 1992 (age 34)
- Place of birth: Craiova, Romania
- Height: 1.82 m (5 ft 11 1/2 in)
- Position: Striker

Team information
- Current team: FC U Craiova

Youth career
- 2007: Şcoala de Fotbal Gică Popescu

Senior career*
Years	Team	Apps	(Gls)
2007–2011	Steaua II București	27	(1)
2010–2011	→ Unirea Urziceni (loan)	4	(0)
2011–2013	Râmnicu Vâlcea	34	(6)
2013–2014	Chindia Târgoviște	12	(1)
2014–2016	Dinamo București	1	(0)
2015	→ Berceni (loan)	12	(4)
2016–2017	Sirens	20	(17)
2018–	FC U Craiova	0	(0)
- * Club domestic league appearances and goals as of 12 January 2018

Robert Theodor Văduva (born 5 September 1992 in Craiova) is a Romanian footballer who plays for FC U Craiova as a striker.

== Career ==
While playing for Steaua II București, Robert was loaned out to Unirea Urziceni. He made his Liga I debut on 11 September 2010, in a match against Steaua București, coming off the bench to replace Alin Toșca in the 85th minute.
