= Fabien Farnolle =

Footballer (born 1985)

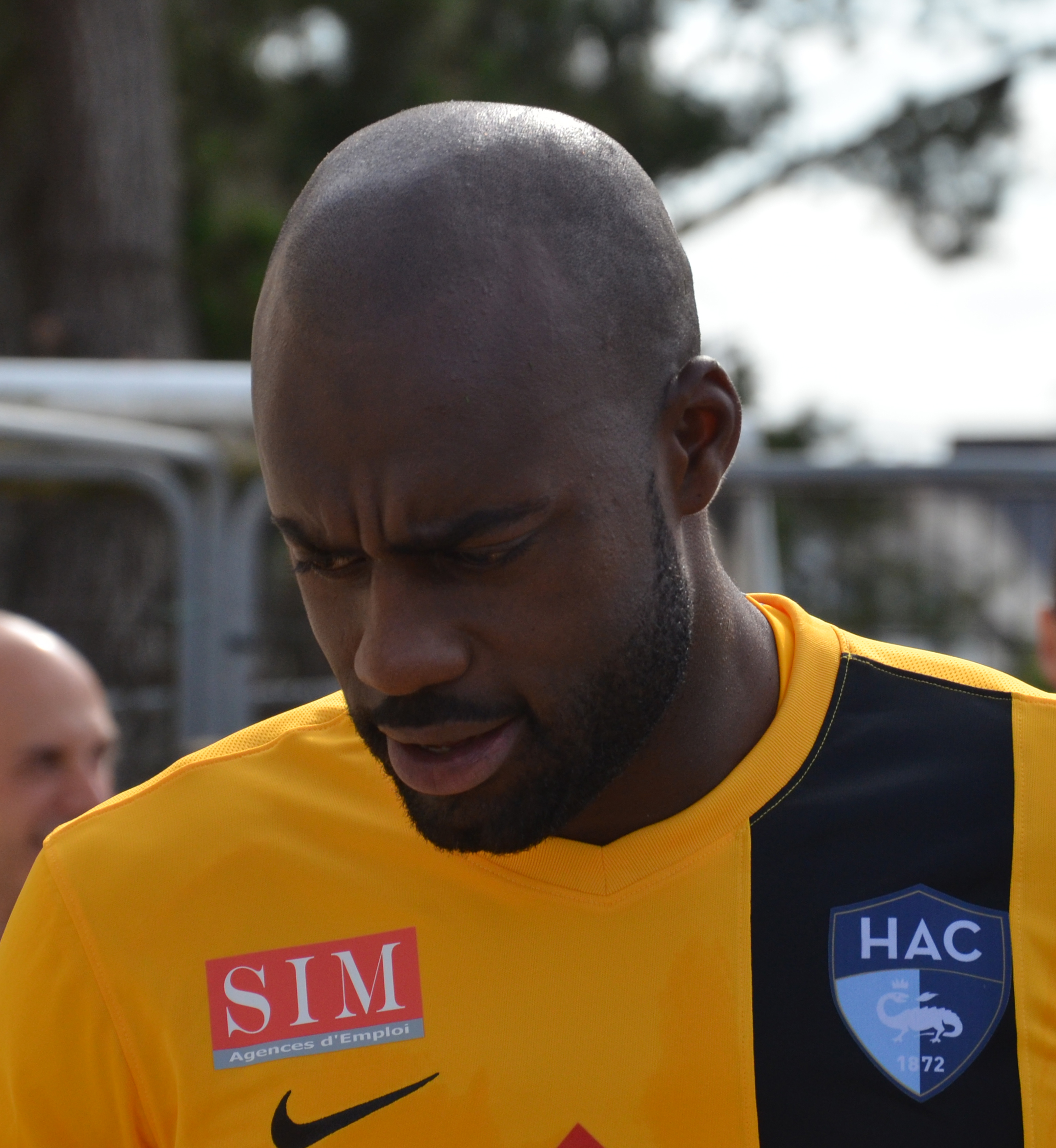
- Farnolle in 2015

Personal information
- Full name: Fabien Ceddy Farnolle
- Date of birth: 5 February 1985 (age 41)
- Place of birth: Bordeaux, France
- Height: 1.96 m (6 ft 5 in)
- Position: Goalkeeper

Youth career
- 1995–2002: Bordeaux

Senior career*
Years	Team	Apps	(Gls)
2002–2005	Bordeaux	0	(0)
2002–2005	Bordeaux B	15	(0)
2005–2006	Vitória Setúbal	0	(0)
2005–2006	Vitória Setúbal B	4	(0)
2006–2007	Quevilly	8	(0)
2007–2008	US Lormont	0	(0)
2008–2009	Libourne	4	(0)
2009–2010	Bordeaux	0	(0)
2009–2010	Bordeaux B	15	(0)
2010–2014	Clermont Foot	109	(0)
2015	Dinamo București	0	(0)
2015–2017	Le Havre	63	(0)
2017–2020	Yeni Malatyaspor	61	(0)
2020–2021	BB Erzurumspor	13	(0)
2021–2022	Sidama Coffee		
Total		293	(0)

International career
2003	France U18		
2012–2021	Benin	31	(0)
- * Club domestic league appearances and goals

Fabien Ceddy Farnolle (born 2 February 1985) is a former professional footballer who played as a goalkeeper. Born in France, he played for the Benin national team at international level.

== Club career ==
Born in Bordeaux, Farnolle joined Girondins de Bordeaux at the age of ten. He was promoted to the senior side in 2002 at the age of 17. His stay in the senior side was short-lived as he was relegated to Bordeaux's reserve side, where he remained for his entire first spell at Bordeaux. His three-year spell with the reserve side saw him play very little with fifteen appearances made over the three years playing for Bordeaux's B team. He left Les Girondins in the summer of 2005 for Portugal. Farnolle signed for Primeira Liga side Vitória de Setúbal.

He impressed manager Luís Norton de Matos, who kept him in the first team squad, where he competed to be Setúbal's number one choice goalkeeper alongside Marcelo Moretto and Marco Tábuas. Despite impressing Setúbal's manager, he was beaten to the starting line up by Marcelo Moretto. His relegation to the bench saw him be relegated to Setúbal's B team, who at the time were playing in the Portuguese Second Division.

Following the end of the 2005–06 season, he left the Sadinos and return to France to play for US Quevilly, where he remained for one season. Over the next few seasons, he moved to several different clubs in the quest to play more first-team football, including a return to Bordeaux, where, like his first spell, he ended up relegated to the B team. In the summer of 2010, he left Bordeaux for Ligue 2 side Clermont Foot, where he established himself as Clermont's first choice goalkeeper.

In February 2015, Farnolle signed a contract for three seasons with Romanian club Dinamo București. He played only one game, in the League Cup, then he became a bench-warmer and two months later decided to put an end to the deal.

Farnolle signed for Turkish club Yeni Malatyaspor in June 2017.

== International career ==
Farnolle represented the French France U18 national team at youth level.

In 2012, Farnolle received an invitation by the Benin Football Federation to play for the Benin national side, as he had Beninese parentage who settled in France prior to his birth. After accepting the invitation, he was selected by then manager Manuel Amoros for Benin's first international game of the year.

Farnolle's debut came against Ethiopia in a 2013 Africa Cup of Nations qualifier on 29 February.

== Career statistics ==
=== Club ===
Appearances and goals by club, season and competition
Club	Season	League			Cup		League cup		Europe		Other		Total	
Club	Season	Division	Apps	Goals	Apps	Goals	Apps	Goals	Apps	Goals	Apps	Goals	Apps	Goals
Libourne	2008–09	National	4	0	0	0	0	0	—		—		4	0
Bordeaux	2009–10	Ligue 1	0	0	0	0	0	0	0	0	—		0	0
Bordeaux B	2009–10	CFA	15	0	—		—		—		—		15	0
Clermont	2010–11	Ligue 2	11	0	2	0	0	0	—		—		13	0
Clermont	2011–12	Ligue 2	37	0	0	0	1	0	—		—		38	0
Clermont	2012–13	Ligue 2	26	0	0	0	1	0	—		—		27	0
Clermont	2013–14	Ligue 2	35	0	0	0	2	0	—		—		37	0
Clermont	Total		109	0	2	0	4	0	—		—		115	0
Dinamo București	2014–15	Liga I	—		—		—		—		1	0	1	0
Le Havre	2015–16	Ligue 2	33	0	0	0	0	0	—		—		33	0
Le Havre	2016–17	Ligue 2	30	0	0	0	2	0	—		—		32	0
Le Havre	Total		63	0	0	0	2	0	—		—		65	0
Yeni Malatyaspor	2017–18	Süper Lig	7	0	4	0	—		—		—		11	0
Yeni Malatyaspor	2018–19	Süper Lig	20	0	3	0	—		—		—		23	0
Yeni Malatyaspor	2019–20	Süper Lig	34	0	0	0	—		4	0	—		38	0
Yeni Malatyaspor	Total		61	0	7	0	—		4	0	—		72	0
Erzurumspor	2020–21	Süper Lig	13	0	0	0	—		—		—		13	0
Career total			265	0	9	0	6	0	4	0	1	0	285	0

=== International ===
Appearances and goals by national team and year
National team	Year	Apps	Goals
Benin	2012	5	0
Benin	2013	1	0
Benin	2014	2	0
Benin	2015	3	0
Benin	2016	4	0
Benin	2017	4	0
Benin	2018	4	0
Benin	2019	6	0
Benin	2020	1	0
Benin	2021	1	0
Total		31	0
