= Constantin Grecu =

Romanian footballer

Personal information
- Date of birth: 8 June 1988 (age 38)
- Place of birth: Craiova, România
- Height: 1.82 m (6 ft 0 in)
- Position: Left back

Youth career
- 1995–2007: Școala de Fotbal Gheorghe Popescu

Senior career*
| Years | Team | Apps | (Gls) |
| 2007 | Energia Rovinari | ? | (?) |
| 2008–2011 | Pandurii Târgu Jiu | 64 | (0) |
| 2008 | → Râmnicu Vâlcea (loan) | 17 | (1) |
| 2011–2012 | Universitatea Cluj | 14 | (0) |
| 2012–2013 | Petrolul Ploiești | 3 | (0) |
| 2013–2014 | Dinamo București | 24 | (0) |
| 2015–2016 | Pandurii Târgu Jiu | 29 | (0) |
| 2017 | Sepsi OSK | 15 | (0) |
| 2018–2020 | FC U Craiova | 11 | (0) |
| 2020–2021 | Pandurii Târgu Jiu | 10 | (0) |
| Total | | 156 | (1) |

International career
| 2004 | Romania U–17 | 4 | (0) |
| 2007 | Romania U–21 | 1 | (0) |
| 2012–2014 | Romania | 1 | (0) |
- * Club domestic league appearances and goals as of 1 March 2021

Constantin Grecu (born 8 June 1988) is a Romanian footballer who plays as a left back.

== Honours ==
Petrolul Ploiești

- Romanian Cup: 2012–13

FC U Craiova 1948

- Liga III: 2019–20
