= Cătălin Samoilă =

Romanian footballer

Personal information
- Full name: Cătălin Ilie Samoilă
- Date of birth: 12 January 1990 (age 36)
- Place of birth: Bucharest, Romania
- Height: 1.84 m (6 ft 0 in)
- Position: Goalkeeper

Team information
- Current team: Agropoli

Youth career
- Național București

Senior career*
Years	Team	Apps	(Gls)
2007–2008	Progresul București	0	(0)
2008–2011	Sportul Studențesc București	21	(0)
2001	→ Concordia Chiajna (loan)	3	(0)
2011	→ Delta Tulcea (loan)	4	(0)
2012	Luceafărul Oradea	10	(0)
2012–2013	Universitatea Cluj	1	(0)
2013–2015	Dinamo București	4	(0)
2013–2015	→ Dinamo II București	26	(0)
2015–2016	Metaloglobus București	?	(?)
2016–2017	Metalul Reșița	9	(0)
2017	Dunărea Giurgiu	?	(?)
2018–2023	Agropoli	?	(?)
2023–	Voința Sibiu	0	(0)
- * Club domestic league appearances and goals as of 29 January 2018

Cătălin Ilie Samoilă (born 12 January 1990) is a Romanian professional footballer who plays as a goalkeeper for Liga IV side Agropoli.
