= Adrian Popa (footballer, born 1990) =

Romanian footballer

Personal information
- Date of birth: 7 April 1990 (age 36)
- Place of birth: Bucharest, Romania
- Height: 1.85 m (6 ft 1 in)
- Position: Centre-back

Team information
- Current team: FCSB (fitness coach)

Youth career
- –2008: Dinamo București

Senior career*
Years	Team	Apps	(Gls)
2008–2014	Dinamo București	10	(0)
2008–2011	→ Snagov (loan)	47	(1)
2012	→ Concordia Chiajna (loan)	5	(0)
2012–2013	→ Universitatea Cluj (loan)	22	(0)
2015–2016	Conquense	15	(0)
2016	Vélez	3	(0)
2016–2017	Alcalá	16	(0)
2017–2019	Popești-Leordeni		
2020–2022	Afumați		
Total		118	(1)

International career
2012	Romania U21	3	(0)

Managerial career
- 2023–2026: CSM Reșița (fitness coach)
- 2026: Al Hilal Omdurman (fitness coach)
- 2026: Espérance de Tunis (fitness coach)
- 2026–: FCSB (fitness coach)
- * Club domestic league appearances and goals

Adrian Popa (born 7 April 1990) is a Romanian former professional footballer who played as a centre-back, currently fitness coach at Liga I club FCSB.

== Playing career ==
Popa joined Dinamo București at the age of 9. He had loan spells with Snagov, Concordia Chiajna and Universitatea Cluj.

He trialled with Spanish club Conquense in August 2015.

He played for the Romania U16 and Romania U21 national teams.

After he retired from playing in 2023, he worked as a fitness coach at CSM Reșița and Afumați.

== Coaching career ==
Popa was appointed fitness coach at Sudanese club Al Hilal Omdurman, coached by Laurențiu Reghecampf, in April 2026.

== Honours ==
Conquense

- Tercera División: 2015–16

Afumați

- Liga III: 2020–21, 2021–22
