= Henrique (footballer, born January 1987) =

Brazilian footballer

Personal information
- Full name: Henrique de Jesus Bernardo
- Date of birth: 19 January 1987 (age 39)
- Place of birth: Campinas, Brazil
- Height: 1.87 m (6 ft 2 in)
- Position: Forward

Youth career
- 2005–2006: Grêmio

Senior career*
Years	Team	Apps	(Gls)
2007–2009	Guarani	0	(0)
2009	Corinthians	11	(0)
2010–2011	Vitória de Setúbal	36	(5)
2012	Náutico	0	(0)
2012	Aluminium Hormozgan	7	(1)
2013	São José	0	(0)
2013–2014	Oțelul Galați	20	(8)
2014	ASA Târgu Mureș	8	(1)
2015	Viitorul Constanța	9	(1)
- * Club domestic league appearances and goals

Henrique de Jesus Bernardo (born 19 January 1987), commonly known as Henrique, is a Brazilian professional footballer who plays as a forward. He was member of the Corinthians team that won the Copa do Brasil in 2009.
