= CS Turnu Severin =

Romanian football club

Turnu Severin
- Full name: Clubul Sportiv Turnu Severin
- Short name: Severin
- Founded: 2007
- Dissolved: 2013
- Ground: Stadionul Municipal
- Capacity: 20,322
Home colours	Away colours	Third colours

Clubul Sportiv Turnu Severin was a Romanian professional football club from Drobeta-Turnu Severin, Mehedinți County, founded in 2007 and dissolved in 2013. In 2012, the team promoted to the Liga I for the first time in their short history. After just one year of top football it relegated and was dissolved.

== History ==
The club was founded in the summer of 2007 after the merger of Gaz Metan Podari and CFR Craiova. It was enrolled in the Liga III for the 2007–08 season. They finished second in the series and participated in the play-offs for the promotion to the Liga II, but failed to qualify.

They finished first in the series the following season, 2008–09. Worthy of notice, the club promoted to the Liga II just two years into its existence.

The first season of Liga II football in history ended with an honorable 7th-place finish. The following season the club finished 10th.

In the summer of 2011 the club moved from Craiova to Drobeta-Turnu Severin to continue the football tradition in this city after the dissolution of FC Drobeta-Turnu Severin. On 1 November 2011 head coach Cosmin Bodea was sacked and his former assistant Florin Pârvu was caretaker, until Marian Bondrea was installed as head coach on 9 November. In that moment, Gaz Metan was only 11th in the championship, after 12 rounds. From that moment on, the team started to climb, and after five consecutive wins jumped to third. Gaz Metan lost only one game in the second part of the season and kept the third place in the championship until the end. Because FC Timişoara, the team that finished first, didn't receive the licence for the first division, the Romanian Football Federation decided that the third place should promote instead. In that way, Gaz Metan Severin climbed to Liga I for the first time in history, and the city, Drobeta-Turnu Severin had a team in the first division after 71 years.

On June 18, 2012, the club was renamed from CS Gaz Metan Severin to CS Turnu Severin.

The club relegated back to the Liga II after just one season of top football, finishing just 2 points behind the relegation line.

Shortly after, it was dissolved, thus Drobeta-Turnu Severin remaining without a football club for the second time in the last two years, after FC Drobeta-Turnu Severin was also dissolved in 2011.

== Honours ==
- Liga II
  - Third place (1): 2011–12
- Liga III
  - Winners (1): 2008–09
  - Runners-up (1): 2007–08

== Managers ==
- (Romania) Cosmin Bodea (June–Nov 2011)
- (Romania) Florin Parvu (interim) (Nov 2011)
- (Romania) Marian Bondrea (Dec 2011 – Aug 12)
- (Romania) Ionel Gane (interim) (Aug–Sep 2012)
- (Italy) Nicolò Napoli (Sep–Dec 2012)
