= 2012–13 FC Dinamo București season =

FC Dinamo București
2012–13 season
- Chairman: Nicolae Badea (until 14 March); Ionuț Negoiță
- Manager: Dario Bonetti (rounds 1-15); Dorinel Munteanu (rounds 16-19); Cornel Ţălnar
- Liga I: 6th
- Cupa României: Quarter-finals
- UEFA Europa League: Play-off
- Supercupa României: Winners
- Top goalscorer: League: Marius Alexe (15 goals); All: Marius Alexe (17 goals)
Home colours	Away colours

The 2012–13 season was FC Dinamo București's 64th consecutive season in Liga I. In this season, Dinamo played in Liga I, Cupa României and UEFA Europa League. The European place was earned after Dinamo won the Romanian Cup in the season before. Dinamo kept Dario Bonetti as head coach, and won the first trophy of the season, Romanian Supercup, with a win against champions CFR Cluj. But after that the good results failed to appear. Dinamo was eliminated from Europa League, and after 15 rounds, when the team laid on the seventh spot of the standings, Dario Bonetti was sacked and Dorinel Munteanu was brought to replace him. In the Romanian Cup, Dinamo was eliminated by CFR Cluj, after extra-time. At the end of 2012, Munteanu resigned citing his desire to coach abroad. His place was taken by Cornel Ţălnar. Under his spell, Dinamo started well the second half of the season and entered the fight for a European place. But after a round of poor results, Dinamo missed a place for a European competition for the first time since 1998.

== Review ==
=== Pre-season ===
Dinamo started its preparations for the new season on 15 June, with the medical examination. Only one new player was present, Andrei Cristea, who returned to Dinamo after one and a half years spent in Germany. Another new player brought by Dinamo was Issa Ba, a Senegalese midfielder whose contract with CS Gaz Metan Mediaş expired. Instead, Dinamo released Iulian Tameş and Dorel Stoica on mutual agreement, and sold Adrian Scarlatache to Khazar Lankaran.

On 21 June, Dinamo left for Austria, for an 18 days training camp, during which, the team played a large number of friendly games. The first matches were against amateur football teams from the Bischofshofen region. Thus, Dinamo's manager, Dario Bonetti had the chance to see the entire team at work, and also the players brought from the youth team, or players on trial. The first important friendly game was played against Ukrainian champions, Shakhtar Donetsk. Dinamo lost the game 1–0. Dinamo failed to win any other friendly game played in Austria, losing five and drawing against Anorthosis Famagusta from Cyprus.

On 26 June, Dinamo lost an important player, Cosmin Moţi, sold to the Bulgarian team Ludogorets Razgrad. The defender who played more than six years for Dinamo was in his final part of his contract, and the Red Dogs accepted the offer because they could lose him for free in the next months.

Instead, Dinamo managed to sign Cristian Scutaru and Mircea Axente, both returning to Liga I where they played for Poli Timișoara. In the previous season, they played for Poli in the second division. Also, Dinamo signed the Bulgarian midfielder Boris Galchev, from CSKA Sofia.

=== Season ===
==== July ====
Dinamo started the season on a high note, winning the first match and consequently the first trophy. It was the Romanian Supercup, where Dinamo defeated the champions CFR Cluj, after penalties. The white and reds controlled the game, having a superior ball possession (60.4%)and a larger number of completed passes (534 vs. 308).

In Liga I, Dinamo played the first game against a newly promoted team, CSS Drobeta-Turnu Severin. In front of 14,500 spectators, Dinamo opened the score in the 51st minute, through Mircea Axente, at his first game for the white-reds. The home team equalized a couple of minutes later, but Ionel Dănciulescu, coming from the bench, brought all three points for Dinamo with a goal scored in the 80th minute. The same day, 20 July, Dinamo sold one of its symbols, Marius Niculae, a player grown at the club's academy, who left for a few years to play abroad, but returned to Dinamo. He was transferred to Liga I rivals FC Vaslui.

The first home game in this season was played on National Arena, where Dinamo decided to move for the entire season. On 29 July, Dinamo defeated CSMS Iaşi 5–2, George Ţucudean scoring four goals and offering the decisive pass for the fifth. The striker received the perfect ten in the Gazeta Sporturilor match chronicle.

==== August ====
The first false step came in the third round, when Dinamo met FC Brașov. In Braşov, Dinamo won only once since 2004, and the black series continued. Braşov led twice, but Dinamo came back every time, and the match ended in a tie.

In the fourth round, Dinamo should've met Rapid Bucuresti, but the game was postponed because at that time Dinamo played a friendly game against giants FC Barcelona. The game was played at National Arena in Bucharest, and although Barcelona won 2–0, Dinamo had moments when they rose to their rivals level.

Eight Dinamo players were called to the national teams for the friendly games played at 15 August. Two of them scored goals, Marius Alexe and George Ţucudean helping Romania U21 squad to win against Sweden U21.

Despite the big number of players who left to play internationally, Dinamo's game in the fifth round was not postponed and the manager was forced to change the squad a lot, players like Marius Alexe, Constantin Nica and Cosmin Matei being rested. Thus, Dinamo failed to win at Chiajna, against Concordia. The game ended 0-0.

The European season started badly for Dinamo. In front of 20,000 fans, at Arena Națională, Dinamo was beaten by the Ukrainian side Metalist Kharkiv, quarterfinalist in the Europa League the previous season.

In the sixth round, Dinamo came back to its old stadium, because Arena Nationala was not available due to a concert by Red Hot Chili Peppers. Only 4,000 fans came to see the match against Petrolul Ploiești. Dinamo took the lead in the third minute, when Srdjan Luchin scored with a header his first goal for the club in the championship. Previously, he scored two goals for Dinamo, both in the Romanian Cup. Petrolul equalised in the 29th minute, but Dario Bonetti's inspiration paid off in the second part. The manager sent Ţucudean on the pitch in the 62nd minute, and the striker scored in the injury time after a cross from Cătălin Munteanu.

In the second leg of the Europa League encounter, Dinamo could not produce a miracle. They were beaten at Kharkiv, 2–1.

==== September ====
The seventh round produce Dinamo's first defeat in the championship. In Ploiești, against Astra, Dinamo lost 1–0, the only goal being scored in the injury time, from a penalty kick. Dinamo played almost the entire second half with only 10 men, Paul Koulibaly being sent off in the 49th minute.

The break for the national teams didn't help, after that Dinamo suffering the third defeat in a row. This time, at home, against Romanian champions CFR Cluj.

The drought was ended at Cluj-Napoca, where Dinamo defeated Universitatea Cluj, 2–1. It was the first game of the season for Ionel Dănciulescu as a starter, and the striker scored one goal, his 209th in Liga I, from a penalty that he obtained. Alexandru Curtean scored the other goal for Dinamo. Three days later, Dinamo started with a win the campaign to defend the trophy in Cupa României. In front of their own fans, at Dinamo Stadium, the red-dogs defeated Vointa Sibiu after extra-time.

==== October ====
In the next championship round, Dinamo met the former leader, Pandurii Targu Jiu. The game was played at National Arena, under special conditions. Dinamo commemorated 12 years since Cătălin Hâldan died, and the supporters created a special captain armband, with Hâldan face. In this game, Ionel Dănciulescu played for the 490th time in Liga I, equalling a record detained so far by Costică Ştefănescu. Dănciulescu scored a goal against Pandurii, his 210th in Liga I. Dinamo defeated Pandurii 3–0. In the next game, at Mediaş, Dănciulescu played his 491st match in Liga I, after which he became the player with the most presences in the first league. The team failed to win the third game in a row, drawing with Gaz Metan, 2-2.

The competition took a break for the national team's games. After the break, Dinamo suffered another defeat at home. The newly promoted Gloria Bistriţa lead 2–0 at Arena Naţională, Dinamo managed to score a single goal and in the second half Ionel Dănciulescu missed a penalty.

The first Bucharest derby of the season was played on 22 October, against Rapid. The game was initially scheduled in August, but it was postponed due to the friendly game against FC Barcelona. Rapid took the lead after a goal from Daniel Pancu, in the 30th minute, but Marius Alexe scored twice, the second time from the penalty spot, and Dinamo won 2–1, climbing to the fifth place in the championship. After that, Dinamo continued its sinusoidal evolution, and failed to win against Ceahlăul Piatra Neamţ. The game ended in a goalless draw.

==== November ====
Dinamo started the month of November on a high note, managing to qualify to the quarterfinals stage of the Romanian Cup with a win in Târgu Jiu, against Pandurii. It was the second win in the season against this team, and the first loss suffered by Pandurii at home.

In the Eternal derby, against Steaua, Dinamo led at the half time, after a goal scored by Marius Alexe. After one hour, the referee, Alexandre Boucaut from Belgium, gave a penalty kick for Steaua, transformed by Raul Rusescu. In the 80th minute, the referee didn't see an obvious foul against Cosmin Matei, committed by Chipciu who should've been sent off for this foul. Two minutes later, Steaua scored for 2–1, and in the 87th minute, their third goal came, putting a 13 points distance between the two rivals.

Neither in the next game, Dinamo could not find the way to victory. The "White-and-reds" lost at home against FC Vaslui, 1–0. Thus, this is the worst start of a season in 41 years for Dinamo, since 1971. As a consequence, Bonetti was sacked and Dorinel Munteanu was installed the new head coach. Munteanu signed a contract for two and a half years. His debut game was in Constanța, against Viitorul. The game was only two days after his installation, so he didn't change much the team comparing with the usual players used by Bonetti. The game ended in a draw, 1-1, after Viitorul failed to convert a penalty in the first half, when the score was 0-0.

The first win under Dorinel Munteanu came against the trainer's former team, Oţelul Galaţi. Dinamo won the game 2–1.

In the quarter-finals of the Romanian Cup, Dinamo played away against CFR Cluj. Despite having a player sent-off, Boubacar Mansaly in the 31st minute, Dinamo took the lead in the 60th minute, due to a goal scored by Marius Alexe. Rafael Bastos equalized in the 66th minute, then Gabriel Mureşan scored the winning goal in the 101st minute, transforming a free kick. Dinamo ended the game with nine players on the pitch, Constantin Nica being sent-off in the final minutes. Dinamo lost 2–1, and failed to defend its trophy.

==== December ====
The month of December started well for Dinamo who won the game against CS Severin, 4–2. The game was played at the Dinamo stadium, instead of Arena Naţională, and brought only 200 people in the stands. Dinamo remained unbeaten with Munteanu for another game, as the match against CSMS Iaşi ended in a draw. The pitch was covered in snow and made the players' mission heavier.

At the end of the year, after only one month and five games in charge at Dinamo, Dorinel Munteanu resigned as head coach, citing the wish to follow his dream to coach abroad. His replacement was Cornel Ţălnar who started his fifth spell at the helm of the team.

==== January ====
After the winter holiday, Dinamo started its preparations for the second half of the season with a training period at Poiana Braşov, during which, the new coach, Cornel Ţălnar, concentrated on physical exercises.

On 21 January, Dinamo announced that defender Cristian Pulhac ended his contract after almost 11 years spent at the club. Dinamo also parted ways with striker George Ţucudean, sold to Standard Liège.

==== February ====
The first official game of the spring season was played against FC Brașov. The game was played at Dinamo stadium, the club decided to move back to its own arena and kept only two games at Arena Naţională, the games against Steaua şi Astra Ploieşti. Against Braşov, Dinamo won 2–1, after two goals from Marius Alexe. The visitors played with only ten men from the 40th minute, after Cristian Ionescu was sent off.

==== March ====
The month of March started perfectly for Dinamo who won the derby against Rapid, played in Giulești stadium. Ionel Dănciulescu scored the only goal of the game.

On 14 March, the club changed its owner. Businessman Ionuț Negoiță bought the stocks that belonged to Nicolae Badea and Dragoş Săvulescu and gained control of 90% of the club.

On 16 March, Dănciulescu made his 500th appearance in Liga I, becoming the first player in history to reach this mile. The event happened in a game lost by Dinamo against Petrolul Ploieşti.

For the game against Astra Giurgiu, Dinamo returned to National Arena, and more than 17.000 fans came to support the team. Dinamo won the game 1–0, after a goal scored by Marius Alexe in the middle of the first half. Before the game, Ionel Dănciulescu was awarded for the 500 appearances in Liga I. He received an award from the club, given by two of Dinamo's legends, Cornel Dinu and Ion Nunweiller, and an award from the CCA – Referees' Commission, given by the referee of the game, Sebastian Colţescu.

==== April ====
Dinamo began April with a 1–0 win away at CFR Cluj, marked their fifth win in six league games. This saw the team climbing to number four in the rankings, two points behind Astra Giurgiu, the team placed on the second spot. Dănciulescu scored the only goal against CFR Cluj.

In the 22nd minute of the Cluj-Napoca game, Dinamo's captain, Cătălin Munteanu was injured. He suffered a rupture of the cruciate ligaments at the right knee and he was operated at a clinic in Turkey.

On 14 April, Dinamo failed to win against Universitatea Cluj, in a game played at Arena Naţională. The Cluj-Napoca team, managed by former Dinamo player Ionel Ganea, opened the score, but Nicolae Muşat scored his first goal for Dinamo and brought a point for the "red dogs". The following round, Dinamo lost away, against Pandurii. This was the first game in 2013 without a goal scored by Dinamo. The team returned quickly to the winning ways with the victory against Gaz Metan Mediaş, the following round. Alexe scored the first goal in this game, his 11th of the Liga I season, and Andrei Cristea ended his goal drought, scoring his first goal of the season.

==== May ====
In the first game of May, Dinamo travelled to Bistriţa to meet Gloria, the last team in the standings. Cornel Ţălnar had a few changes in the squad, Dorin Rotariu, 17 years, being used in the starting 11 for the first time in his career. Gloria led after a goal scored by Andrei Enescu, but Marius Alexe scored twice, each time from the penalty spot, and Dinamo took all the three points.

Alexe scored again in the following game, at home, against Ceahlăul, but his goal was not enough for a win. The game ended with a draw, 1-1.

On 10 May, Dinamo met its biggest rival, Steaua. The game was played at Arena Naţională, in front of 43,789 spectators. Steaua won 2–0, Dinamo losing for the fourth time in a row in the Eternal derby.

Dinamo continued its bad shape the following week, when they lost against FC Vaslui, 4–1, the biggest loss suffered during the entire season. The next game brought another defeat. This time, at home, against Viitorul Constanţa. Dinamo led 2–1, but the visitors scored twice in the final half-hour and won 3–2. After this match, Dinamo lost all chances to qualify for a European competition, ending a period of 15 consecutive years in the continental cups.

The final game of the season was played away at Oţelul Galaţi. Dinamo won 1-0 after a goal scored by Mircea Axente. Despite this win, Dinamo finished the season on the sixth place.

== Squad changes ==
Transfers in:

No.	Pos.	Nat.	Name	Age	EU	Moving from	Type	Transfer window	Ends	Transfer fee	Source
18	MF	(Senegal)	Issa Ba	30	Non-EU	Gaz Metan Mediaș	Transfer	Summer	2013	Free	fcdinamo.ro
17	FW	(Romania)	Andrei Cristea	28	EU	Karlsruher SC (Germany)	Transfer	Summer	2015	Free	prosport.ro
19	MF	(Senegal)	Boubacar Mansaly	24	Non-EU	Drancy (France)	Transfer	Summer	2016	Undisclosed	gsp.ro
33	MF	(Romania)	Steliano Filip	18	EU	FC Maramureș	Transfer	Summer	2017	Free	banatsport.ro
8	MF	(Bulgaria)	Boris Galchev	28	EU	CSKA Sofia (Bulgaria)	Transfer	Summer	2014	Undisclosed	fcdinamo.ro
6	DF	(Romania)	Cristian Scutaru	25	EU	Politehnica Timișoara	Transfer	Summer	2017	Undisclosed	fcdinamo.ro
15	FW	(Romania)	Mircea Axente	25	EU	Politehnica Timișoara	Transfer	Summer	2016	Undisclosed	fcdinamo.ro
30	DF	(Burkina Faso)	Paul Koulibaly	26	Non-EU	Asswehly (Libya)	Transfer	Summer	2015	Undisclosed	gsp.ro
27	MF	(Honduras)	Edgar Álvarez	32	Non-EU	Palermo (Italy)	Transfer	Summer	2013	Free	fcdinamo.ro
30	DF	(Romania)	Alexandru Dandea	24	EU	Turnu Severin	Transfer	Winter	2016	Free	fcdinamo.ro
18	DF	(Romania)	Alexandru Tudose	25	EU	Gloria Bistrița	Transfer	Winter	2013	Free	fcdinamo.ro

Transfers out:

No.	Pos.	Nat.	Name	Age	EU	Moving to	Type	Transfer window	Transfer fee	Source
	MF	(Romania)	Dorel Stoica	33	EU		Released	Summer	Free	fcdinamo.ro
	MF	(Romania)	Iulian Tameș	33	EU	Brașov	Released	Summer	Free	fcdinamo.ro
	DF	(Romania)	Adrian Scarlatache	25	EU	Khazar (Azerbaijan)	Transfer	Summer	Undisclosed	fcdinamo.ro
	MF	(Albania)	Elis Bakaj	24	Non-EU	Chornomorets Odesa (Ukraine)	Transfer	Summer	Undisclosed	chornomorets.football
	GK	(Romania)	George Curcă	31	EU		Released	Summer	Free	cancan.ro
	DF	(Romania)	Cosmin Moți	27	EU	Ludogorets Razgrad (Bulgaria)	Transfer	Summer	Undisclosed	fcdinamo.ro
	MF	(Burkina Faso)	Djakaridja Koné	25	Non-EU	Evian (France)	Released	Summer	Free	etgfc.com
	FW	(Brazil)	Michel Platini	28	Non-EU	CSKA Sofia (Bulgaria)	Transfer	Summer	Undisclosed	pfkcska.bg
	FW	(Romania)	Marius Niculae	31	EU	Vaslui	Transfer	Summer	Undisclosed	fcdinamo.ro
	FW	(Romania)	Georgian Păun	26	EU	Braşov	Released	Summer	Free	gsp.ro
8	MF	(Bulgaria)	Boris Galchev	29	EU	Botev Plovdiv	Transfer	Winter	Free	botevplovdiv.bg
30	DF	(Burkina Faso)	Paul Koulibaly	26	Non-EU		Released	Winter	Free	mediafax.ro
27	MF	(Honduras)	Edgar Álvarez	33	Non-EU		Released	Winter	Free	mediafax.ro
3	DF	(Romania)	Cristian Pulhac	28	EU	Gabala (Azerbaijan)	Released	Winter	Free	fcdinamo.ro
29	FW	(Romania)	George Ţucudean	21	EU	Standard Liège (Belgium)	Transfer	Winter	Undisclosed	fcdinamo.ro
18	MF	(Senegal)	Issa Ba	31	Non-EU		Released	Winter	Free	fcdinamo.ro

Last updated: 2013-02-11

== Squad statistics ==
No.	Pos.	Name	League			Cup		Europe		Other		Total	
No.	Pos.	Name	Apps	Mins	Goals	Apps	Goals	Apps	Goals	Apps	Goals	Apps	Goals
2	DF	(Romania) Nica	15(4)	1270	0	2	0	1	0	1	0	19(4)	0
3	MF	(Romania) Rotariu	1(6)	131	0	0	0	0	0	0	0	1(6)	0
4	MF	(Romania) Matei	27(1)	2169	5	1	0	2	0	0(1)	0	30(2)	5
6	DF	(Romania) Scutaru	4(1)	323	0	1(1)	0	0	0	0	0	5(2)	0
7	MF	(Romania) Munteanu	22(1)	1951	0	2	0	2	0	1	0	27(1)	0
8	DF	(Romania) Muşat	16	1415	1	0	0	0	0	0	0	16	1
10	MF	(Romania) Alexe	30(1)	2576	15	2	2	1(1)	0	1	0	34(2)	17
15	FW	(Romania) Axente	4(10)	446	4	0(1)	0	0(1)	0	0	0	4(12)	4
16	DF	(Romania) Radu	0(1)	29	0	0	0	0	0	0	0	0(1)	0
16	DF	(Romania) Homei	0	0	0	1	0	0	0	0	0	1	0
17	FW	(Romania) Cristea	3(16)	479	1	0	0	0	0	0	0	3(16)	1
18	FW	(Romania) Tudose	3(2)	346	0	0	0	0	0	0	0	3(2)	0
19	MF	(Senegal) Boubacar	26	2247	0	3	0	2	0	1	0	32	0
20	MF	(Romania) Curtean	25(7)	2152	2	0(2)	0	1(1)	1	0(1)	0	27(10)	3
21	DF	(Romania) Grigore	30(2)	2711	1	2(1)	0	2	0	1	0	35(3)	1
22	MF	(Romania) Strătilă	4(6)	371	1	(0)1	1	0	0	0	0	4(7)	2
23	GK	(North Macedonia) Naumovski	10	900	0	0	0	0	0	0	0	10	0
24	DF	(Romania) Luchin	29	2574	1	3	0	2	0	1	0	35	1
25	FW	(Romania) Dănciulescu	20(7)	1866	7	1	0	0(1)	0	0	0	21(8)	7
26	MF	(Romania) Rus	27(4)	2529	1	1(1)	1	0	0	1	0	30(4)	2
27	MF	(Romania) Roman	0(1)	17	0	0	0	0	0	0	0	0(1)	0
27	MF	(Romania) Stănescu	1	63	0	0	0	0	0	0	0	1	0
30	DF	(Romania) Dandea	9(5)	859	0	0	0	0	0	0	0	9(5)	0
32	DF	(Romania) Burnea	0	0	0	1	0	0	0	0	0	1	0
33	MF	(Romania) Filip	1(8)	191	0	1	0	0(1)	0	0	0	2(9)	0
34	GK	(Romania) Bălgrădean	24	2160	0	3	0	2	0	1	0	30	0
Players sold or loaned out during the season
3	DF	(Romania) Pulhac	17	1439	0	2	0	1	0	1	0	21	0
8	MF	(Romania) Galchev	3(1)	340	0	1	0	1(1)	0	0	0	5(2)	0
9	FW	(Romania) Niculae	0	0	0	0	0	0	0	1	0	1	0
18	MF	(Senegal) Ba	4(3)	414	1	1(1)	0	1	0	1	0	7(4)	1
27	MF	(Honduras) Álvarez	4(1)	245	0	1	0	0	0	0	0	5(1)	0
29	FW	(Romania) Ţucudean	9(9)	936	6	3	0	2	0	0(1)	2	14(10)	8
30	DF	(Burkina Faso) Koulibaly	6(2)	461	0	1	0	2	0	0	0	9(2)	0

Statistics accurate as of match played 28 May 2013

== Disciplinary record ==
Includes all competitive matches.

Last updated on 28 May 2013

No.	Pos	Name	Liga I			Cupa României			Europa League			Total		
No.	Pos	Name	Booked	(yellow card) (yellow-red card)	Sent off (straight red)	Booked	(yellow card) (yellow-red card)	Sent off (straight red)	Booked	(yellow card) (yellow-red card)	Sent off (straight red)	Booked	(yellow card) (yellow-red card)	Sent off (straight red)
2	DF	Constantin Nica	7	2	0	1	1	0	1	0	0	9	3	0
4	MF	Cosmin Matei	5	0	0	0	0	0	2	0	0	7	0	0
7	MF	Cătălin Munteanu	5	0	0	1	0	0	0	0	0	6	0	0
8	DF	Nicolae Muşat	3	0	0	0	0	0	0	0	0	3	0	0
10	FW	Marius Alexe	7	0	0	0	0	0	0	0	0	7	0	0
15	FW	Mircea Axente	2	0	0	0	0	0	0	0	0	2	0	0
17	FW	Andrei Cristea	3	0	0	0	0	0	0	0	0	3	0	0
18	DF	Alexandru Tudose	1	0	0	0	0	0	0	0	0	1	0	0
19	MF	Boubacar Mansaly	9	0	0	3	1	0	1	0	0	13	1	0
20	MF	Alexandru Curtean	5	0	0	1	0	0	0	0	0	6	0	0
21	DF	Dragoș Grigore	7	0	0	1	0	0	1	0	0	9	0	0
22	MF	Sorin Strătilă	3	0	0	0	0	0	0	0	0	3	0	0
23	GK	Kristijan Naumovski	1	0	0	0	0	0	0	0	0	1	0	0
24	DF	Srdjan Luchin	8	0	1	0	0	0	0	0	0	8	0	1
25	FW	Ionel Dănciulescu	7	0	0	1	0	0	0	0	0	8	0	0
26	MF	Laurențiu Rus	7	0	0	0	0	0	0	0	0	7	0	0
30	DF	Alexandru Dandea	1	0	0	0	0	0	0	0	0	1	0	0
33	MF	Steliano Filip	0	0	0	0	0	0	0	0	1	0	0	1
34	GK	Cristian Bălgrădean	4	0	0	0	0	0	0	0	0	4	0	0
Players sold or loaned out during the season
3	DF	Cristian Pulhac	5	0	0	0	0	0	0	0	0	5	0	0
8	MF	Boris Galchev	2	0	0	0	0	0	0	0	0	2	0	0
18	MF	Issa Ba	2	0	0	0	0	0	0	0	0	2	0	0
27	MF	Edgar Álvarez	1	0	0	0	0	0	0	0	0	1	0	0
29	FW	George Ţucudean	4	0	0	1	0	0	1	0	0	6	0	0
30	DF	Paul Koulibaly	1	0	1	0	0	0	0	0	0	1	0	1

== Club ==
=== Technical staff ===
Position	Staff
Head Coach First Team	(Romania) Cornel Ţălnar
Assistant Coach	(Romania) Florentin Petre
Assistant Coach	(Romania) Ilie Alexe
Goalkeeper Coach	(Romania) Florin Tene
Physical fitness coach	(Romania) Constantin Niculae

Last updated: 28 December
Source: FC Dinamo Official Website

== Competitions ==
=== Overall ===
FC Dinamo plays in four competitions: Liga I, UEFA Europa League, Cupa României and Supercupa României.

Competition	Started round	Current position / round	Final position / round	First match	Last match
Liga I	Round 1	—	6	vs CS Turnu Severin	vs Oțelul Galați
Cupa României	Round of 32	—	Quarter-finals	vs Voința Sibiu	vs CFR Cluj
Supercupa României	—		Winners	vs CFR Cluj	
Europa League	Play-off round	—	Play-off round	vs Metalist Kharkiv	

=== Liga I ===
==== Standings ====
Pos	Team	Pld	W	D	L	GF	GA	GD	Pts	Qualification or relegation
4	Astra Giurgiu	34	17	9	8	64	37	+27	60	Qualification to Europa League first qualifying round (Note: Astra Giurgiu qualified for the first qualifying round of the 2013–14 UEFA Europa as Petrolul won the 2012–13 Cupa României and secured a place in the second qualifying round of the 2013–14 UEFA Europa.)
5	Vaslui	34	16	10	8	50	34	+16	58	
6	Dinamo București	34	16	8	10	48	40	+8	56	
7	Brașov	34	14	9	11	50	51	−1	51	
8	Rapid București (R)	34	13	10	11	35	35	0	49 (Note: CFR 0-0 RAP; RAP 3-2 CFR)	Relegation to Liga II (Note: Rapid did not obtain a licence for the 2013–14 season, therefore Concordia Chiajna were spared from relegation.)

Source: Liga I (in Romanian)
Rules for classification: 1) points; 2) head-to-head points; 3) head-to-head goal difference; 4) head-to-head goals scored; 5) goal difference; 6) number of goals scored.
(R) Relegated

==== Results summary ====
Overall								Home						Away					
Pld	W	D	L	GF	GA	GD	Pts	W	D	L	GF	GA	GD	W	D	L	GF	GA	GD
34	16	8	10	48	40	+8	56	10	2	5	30	19	+11	6	6	5	18	21	−3

Last updated: 28 May 2013.
Source: Competitive Matches

==== Results by round ====
Round	1	2	3	4	5	6	7	8	9	10	11	12	13	14	15	16	17	18	19	20	21	22	23	24	25	26	27	28	29	30	31	32	33	34
Ground	A	H	A	H	A	H	A	H	A	H	A	H	A	A	H	A	H	H	A	H	A	H	A	H	A	H	A	H	A	H	H	A	H	A
Result	W	W	D	W	D	W	L	L	W	W	D	L	D	L	L	D	W	W	D	W	W	W	L	W	W	D	L	W	W	D	L	L	L	W
Position	3	2	3	4	4	3	5	8	5	5	5	5	6	7	7	8	7	7	7	7	6	4	5	5	4	5	5	5	4	5	5	5	6	6

Updated to match(es) played on 28 May 2013. Source: Competitive Matches
A = Away; H = Home; W = Win; D = Draw; L = Loss

== Results ==
=== Competitive ===
==== Liga I ====
Kickoff times are in EET.

20 July 1	CS Turnu Severin	1–2	Dinamo București	Municipal
20:20	Vancea 52'	Report	Axente 50'; Dănciulescu 80'; Grigore (yellow card) 66'; Dănciulescu (yellow card) 80'	Attendance: 14,500; Referee: Alexandru Tudor (București)

29 July 2	Dinamo București	5–2	CSMS Iași	Arena Națională
21:30	Ţucudean 13', 22', 46', 48'; Rus 50'; Pulhac (yellow card) 64'; Alexe (yellow card) 66'	Report	Onofraș 28'; Vladu 83'	Attendance: 7,850; Referee: Marius Bocăneală (Galați)

6 August 3	FC Brașov	2–2	Dinamo București	Silviu Ploeşteanu
21:30	Batin 16'; Buga 59'	Report	Grigore 39'; Matei 72'; Muşat (yellow card) 44'	Attendance: 7,000; Referee: Sebastian Colţescu (Craiova)

22 October 4	Dinamo București	2–1	Rapid București	Arena Națională
21:30	Alexe 45', 62' (pen.); Alexe (yellow card) 63'	Report	Pancu 30'	Attendance: 16,037; Referee: Cristian Balaj (Baia Mare)

17 August 5	Concordia Chiajna	0–0	Dinamo București	Concordia
21:30		Report	Boubacar (yellow card) 29'; Munteanu (yellow card) 90+2'	Attendance: 5,000; Referee: Marius Avram (București)

26 August 6	Dinamo București	2–1	Petrolul Ploiești	Dinamo
21:30	Luchin 3'; Ţucudean 90+3'; Luchin (yellow card) 21'; Curtean (yellow card) 53'; Galchev (yellow card) 59'; Grigore (yellow card) 61'	Report	Grozav 29'	Attendance: 4,000; Referee: Cristian Balaj (Baia Mare)

2 September 7	Astra Giurgiu	1–0	Dinamo București	Astra
17:00	Tembo 90+5' (pen.)	Report	Koulibaly (red card) 49'; Nica (yellow card) 69'; Grigore (yellow card) 90+3'	Attendance: 3,000; Referee: Adrian Cojocaru (Galați)

14 September 8	Dinamo București	0–1	CFR Cluj	Arena Națională
21:30	Munteanu (yellow card) 8'; Boubacar (yellow card) 34'	Report	Rui Pedro 64'	Attendance: 15,000; Referee: Marius Avram (București)

22 September 9	Universitatea Cluj	1–2	Dinamo București	Cluj Arena
21:30	Dinu 7' (pen.)	Report	Dănciulescu 23' (pen.); Curtean 63'; Boubacar (yellow card) 2'; Pulhac (yellow card) 7'; Nica (yellow card) 34'	Attendance: 9,000; Referee: Teodor Crăciunescu (Râmnicu Vâlcea)

1 October 10	Dinamo București	3–0	Pandurii Târgu Jiu	Arena Națională
20:30	Curtean 6'; Alexe 57'; Dănciulescu 77'; Nica (yellow card) 38'; Pulhac (yellow card) 56'; Dănciulescu (yellow card) 67'	Report		Attendance: 13,545; Referee: Sebastian Colţescu (Craiova)

6 October 11	Gaz Metan Mediaș	2–2	Dinamo București	Gaz Metan
21:30	Astafei 26'; Bawab 38'	Report	Alexe 17'; Trtovac 48' (o.g.); Rus (yellow card) 50'; Pulhac (yellow card) 56'; Nica (yellow card) 62' (yellow-red card) 78'	Attendance: 5,000; Referee: István Kovacs (Carei)

19 October 12	Dinamo București	1–2	Gloria Bistrița	Arena Națională
21:30	Matei 45'; Koulibaly (yellow card) 90+5'	Report	Bragança 27'; Predescu 41'	Attendance: 6,127; Referee: Radu Petrescu (București)

27 October 13	Ceahlăul Piatra Neamț	0–0	Dinamo București	Ceahlăul
21:30		Report	Curtean (yellow card) 4'; Ţucudean (yellow card) 25'; Matei (yellow card) 41'; Álvarez (yellow card) 75'; Ba (yellow card) 90'	Attendance: 5,000; Referee: Lucian Rusandu (Sf. Gheorghe)

4 November 14	Steaua București	3–1	Dinamo București	Arena Națională
21:30	Rusescu 63' (pen.), 83'; Szukała 87'	Report	Alexe 38'; Munteanu (yellow card) 42'; Matei (yellow card) 75'; Boubacar (yellow card) 89'	Attendance: 49,112; Referee: Alexandre Boucaut (Belgium)

10 November 15	Dinamo București	0–1	FC Vaslui	Arena Națională
21:30	Dănciulescu (yellow card) 11'; Pulhac (yellow card) 64'; Ba (yellow card) 70'; Grigore (yellow card) 70'; Luchin (red card) 77'; Ţucudean (yellow card) 90+2'; Alexe (yellow card) 90+4'	Report	Sânmărtean 37'	Attendance: 4,500; Referee: Marius Avram (București)

17 November 16	Viitorul Constanța	1–1	Dinamo București	Farul
21:30	Benzar 72'	Report	Ba 79'; Nica (yellow card) 16'	Attendance: 4,000; Referee: Marcel Bîrsan (București)

23 November 17	Dinamo București	2–1	Oțelul Galați	Arena Națională
20:30	Alexe 16' (pen.); Matei 30' (pen.); Ţucudean (yellow card) 42'; Munteanu (yellow card) 61'; Matei (yellow card) 79'	Report	Rus 60' (o.g.)	Attendance: 4,000; Referee: Lucian Rusandu (Sf. Gheorghe)

3 December 18	Dinamo București	4–2	CS Turnu Severin	Dinamo
20:30	Matei 34'; Dănciulescu 47'; Alexe 51' (pen.); Ţucudean 56'; Ţucudean (yellow card) 10'; Galchev (yellow card) 57'	Report	Neacșa 15' (pen.); Thomas 80'	Attendance: 200; Referee: Cătălin Popa (Pitești)

9 December 19	CSMS Iași	1–1	Dinamo București	Emil Alexandrescu
20:00	Straton 1'	Report	Tincu 22' (o.g.); Rus (yellow card) 59'	Attendance: 1,500; Referee: Cristian Balaj (Baia Mare)

24 February 20	Dinamo București	2–1	FC Brașov	Dinamo
20:30	Alexe 18', 33' (pen.); Rus (yellow card) 21'; Curtean (yellow card) 29'; Nica (yellow card) 89'	Report	Păun 60'; Ionescu (red card) 40'	Attendance: 4,500; Referee: Marcel Bârsan (București)

3 March 21	Rapid București	0–1	Dinamo București	Giulești-Valentin Stănescu
20:30		Report	Dănciulescu 64'; Grigore (yellow card) 8'; Mușat (yellow card) 32'; Dănciulescu (yellow card) 40'; Boubacar (yellow card) 71'; Bălgrădean (yellow card) 76'; Cristea (yellow card) 78'	Attendance: 11,000; Referee: Marius Avram (București)

11 March 22	Dinamo București	2–0	Concordia Chiajna	Dinamo
19:30	Axente 86'; Matei 90+4'; Alexe (yellow card) 55'; Luchin (yellow card) 58'; Nica (yellow card) 71' (yellow-red card) 77'	Report		Attendance: 7,000; Referee: Istvan Kovacs (Carei)

16 March 23	Petrolul Ploiești	2–1	Dinamo București	Ilie Oană
21:30	Bokila 8' (pen.); Sauvadet 55'	Report	Axente 14'; Boubacar (yellow card) 31'; Luchin (yellow card) 63'	Attendance: 15,000; Referee: Radu Petrescu (București)

31 March 24	Dinamo București	1–0	Astra Giurgiu	Arena Națională
20:30	Alexe 23'; Munteanu (yellow card) 43'; Luchin (yellow card) 87'; Bălgrădean (yellow card) 88'	Report		Attendance: 17,654; Referee: Sebastian Colţescu (Craiova)

6 April 25	CFR Cluj	0–1	Dinamo București	Dr. Constantin Rădulescu
21:30		Report	Dănciulescu 62'; Rus (yellow card) 65'; Boubacar (yellow card) 73'; Bălgrădean (yellow card) 90'	Attendance: 6,000; Referee: Alexandru Tudor (București)

13 April 26	Dinamo București	1–1	Universitatea Cluj	Arena Națională
21:30	Mușat 80'; Curtean (yellow card) 14'; Dănciulescu (yellow card) 26'; Alexe (yellow card) 65'; Matei (yellow card) 70'; Luchin (yellow card) 70'; Bălgrădean (yellow card) 90+5'	Report	Tony 74'	Attendance: 18,631; Referee: Cătălin Popa (Piteşti)

21 April 27	Pandurii Târgu Jiu	2–0	Dinamo București	Tudor Vladimirescu
21:30	Ibeh 50'; Nistor 74'	Report	Boubacar (yellow card) 26'; Axente (yellow card) 27'; Luchin (yellow card) 89'	Attendance: 8,000; Referee: Ovidiu Haţegan (Arad)

28 April 28	Dinamo București	2–0	Gaz Metan Mediaș	Arena Națională
14:00	Alexe 43'; Cristea 83'; Rus (yellow card) 37'; Mușat (yellow card) 48'; Cristea (yellow card) 84'	Report		Attendance: 19,257; Referee: Adrian Comănescu (Rm. Vâlcea)

3 May 29	Gloria Bistrița	1–2	Dinamo București	Jean Pădureanu
20:30	Enescu 21'	Report	Alexe 26' (pen.), 75' (pen.); Luchin (yellow card) 20'; Matei (yellow card) 61'; Alexe (yellow card) 80'	Attendance: 6,000; Referee: Lucian Rusandu (Sfântu Gheorghe)

7 May 30	Dinamo București	1–1	Ceahlăul Piatra Neamț	Arena Națională
19:00	Alexe 67'; Tudose (yellow card) 70'	Report	Lukanović 24'	Attendance: 9,468; Referee: Radu Petrescu (București)

10 May 31	Dinamo București	0–2	Steaua București	Arena Națională
21:00	Curtean (yellow card) 19'; Dănciulescu (yellow card) 56'; Strătilă (yellow card) 58'; Rus (yellow card) 61'; Dandea (yellow card) 75'; Cristea (yellow card) 83'	Report	Boubacar 13' (o.g.); Tănase 70'	Attendance: 43,789; Referee: Sebastian Colţescu (Craiova)

18 May 32	FC Vaslui	4–1	Dinamo București	Municipal
21:30	Antal 22'; Celeban 33'; Stanciu 59'; Temwanjera 89'	Report	Strătilă 27'; Strătilă (yellow card) 41'	Attendance: 3,000; Referee: Ovidiu Haţegan (Arad)

24 May 33	Dinamo București	2–3	Viitorul Constanța	Dinamo
21:30	Dănciulescu 16'; Alexe 50'; Dănciulescu (yellow card) 43'; Grigore (yellow card) 69'	Report	Lazăr 11'; Chițu 62'; Bălașa 89'	Attendance: 3,000; Referee: Cristian Balaj (Baia Mare)

28 May 34	Oțelul Galați	0–1	Dinamo București	Oțelul
22:00		Report	Axente 68'; Boubacar 38'; Naumovski 44'; Strătilă 45'; Rus 52'; Grigore 54'; Alexe 60'; Axente 73'; Luchin 79'	Attendance: 5,000; Referee: Marian Balaci (Tr. Severin)

==== UEFA Europa League ====
23 August PO, 1L	Dinamo București	0–2	(Ukraine) Metalist Kharkiv	Arena Națională, București
20:30	Grigore (yellow card) 22'; Matei (yellow card) 41'; Ţucudean (yellow card) 72'	Report	Cleiton Xavier 9'; Cristaldo 57'	Attendance: 20,000; Referee: Pawel Gil (Poland)

30 August PO, 2L	Metalist Kharkiv (Ukraine)	2–1 (4–1 agg.)	Dinamo București	Metalist, Kharkiv
21:00	Blanco 28'; Cristaldo 61'	Report	Curtean 52'; Boubacar (yellow card) 69'; Matei (yellow card) 75'; Filip (red card) 82'; Nica (yellow card) 88'	Attendance: 33,417; Referee: Hüseyin Göçek (Turkey)

==== Cupa României ====
25 September R32	Dinamo București	2–1 (a.e.t.)	Voința Sibiu	Dinamo, București
19:00	Strătilă 62'; Rus 93'; Boubacar (yellow card) 28'; Dănciulescu (yellow card) 119'	Report	Valter Heil 52'	Attendance: 1,000; Referee: Paul Unimatan (Zalău)

1 November R16	Pandurii Târgu Jiu	1–2	Dinamo București	Tudor Vladimirescu, Târgu Jiu
21:30	Lemnaru 73'	Report	Alexe 37'; Mamele 90+1' (o.g.); Grigore (yellow card) 45'; Munteanu (yellow card) 55'; Boubacar (yellow card) 76'	Attendance: 4,000; Referee: Istvan Kovacs (Carei)

28 November QF	CFR Cluj	2–1 (a.e.t.)	Dinamo București	Dr. Constantin Rădulescu, Cluj-Napoca
20:30	Bastos 66'; Mureșan 101'	Report	Alexe 62'; Boubacar (yellow card) 8' (yellow-red card) 31'; Nica (yellow card) 42' (yellow-red card) 114'; Ţucudean (yellow card) 45'; Curtean (yellow card) 120'	Attendance: 5,000; Referee: Sebastian Colţescu (Craiova)

==== Supercupa României ====
14 July	CFR Cluj	2–2 (2–4 p)	Dinamo București	Arena Națională, București
21:00	Valente 36'; Kapetanos 102'	Report	Ţucudean 62', 101'; Boubacar (yellow card) 95'; Grigore (yellow card) 107'; Munteanu (yellow card) 110'	Attendance: 9,960; Referee: Ovidiu Haţegan (Arad)
	Penalties
	Kapetanos (penalty scored); Sougou (penalty missed); Hora (penalty missed); Mureşan (penalty scored)		Alexe (penalty scored); Matei (penalty scored); Munteanu (penalty scored); Ţucudean (penalty missed); Grigore (penalty scored)

=== Non competitive matches ===
24 June	SK Austria Klagenfurt	0–6	Dinamo București	Bischofshofen, Austria
18:00		Report	Dănciulescu 45'; Rus 56'; Ţucudean 66'; Filip 67'; Muşat 71'; Strătilă 76'	Stadium: Sportplatz Bischofshofen

27 June	USK Anif	1–5	Dinamo București	Bischofshofen, Austria
19:00	Elvis Alibabic 76'	Report	Axente 6', 89'; Ţucudean 13'; Platini 60'; Mărkuș 70'	Stadium: Sportplatz Bischofshofen

28 June	Shakhtar Donetsk	1–0	Dinamo București	Going am Wilden Kaiser, Austria
19:00	Zhychykov 76'	Report		Stadium: Stadion Wilder Kaiser

30 June	SV Grödig	3–0	Dinamo București	Bischofshofen, Austria
15:30	Öbster 11'; Jukic 37', 44'	Report		Stadium: Sportplatz Bischofshofen

1 July	Anorthosis Famagusta	1–1	Dinamo București	Kufstein, Austria
18:00	Laborde 71'	Report	Alexe 16'	Stadium: Kufstein-Arena

2 July	Ludogorets Razgrad	3–1	Dinamo București	Bischofshofen, Austria
19:00	Gargorov 19', 52'; Ivanov 55'	Report	Ţucudean 82' (pen.)	Stadium: Sportplatz Bischofshofen

4 July	Mladá Boleslav	1–0	Dinamo București	Lenzing, Austria
19:00	Mareš 63'	Report

7 July	Neftchi Baku	2–0	Dinamo București	Kirchdorf in Tirol, Austria
19:00	Mitreski 34'; Wobay 49'	Report		Stadium: Leerberg-Arena

8 July	Kuban Krasnodar	1–0	Dinamo București	Bischofshofen, Austria
15:00	Tlisov 76'	Report		Stadium: Sportplatz Bischofshofen

11 August	Dinamo București	0–2	FC Barcelona	Bucharest, Romania
20:15		Report	Messi 4'; Afellay 90+3'	Stadium: Arena Naţională; Attendance: 40,000; Referee: Cristian Balaj (Romania)

20 January	Dinamo București	8–1	FC Râşnov	Braşov, Romania
	Curtean 9'; Matei 14'; Alexe 50'; Cristea 64', 78', 80'; Filip 76'; Ioniţă 80'	Report	Manole 55'	Attendance: 1,000

24 January	AS Vulcan	0–11	Dinamo București	Vulcan, Romania
		Report	Cristea 13', 44'; Alexe 22'; Scutaru 49'; Țucudean 50', 63', 70', 71'; Crăciun 82'; Dănciulescu 84'; Curtean 85'	Attendance: 800

4 February	Dinamo București	3–1	Lech Poznań	Marbella, Spain
	Dandea 14'; Axente 55'; Curtean 76'	Report	Reiss 70'	Stadium: Estadio Municipal de San Pedro de Alcantara

7 February	Dinamo București	2–1	Torpedo Kutaisi	Marbella, Spain
	Dănciulescu 8', 54'	Report	Dolidze 83'	Stadium: Marbella Football Center

9 February	Marbella	2–3	Dinamo București	Marbella, Spain
		Report	Axente 15'; Filip 16'; Rotariu 61'	Stadium: Marbella Football Center

10 February	Dinamo București	0–1	Atlético Paranaense	Marbella, Spain
		Report	Marcão 37'	Stadium: Estadio Municipal de San Pedro de Alcantara

21 March	FC Zărnești	0–8	Dinamo București	Zărnești, Romania
		Report	Dandea 5', 7'; Alexe 43'; Cristea 47', 55', 80'; Axente 48', 84'
