= Constantin Nica =

Romanian footballer (born 1993)

Costi Nica
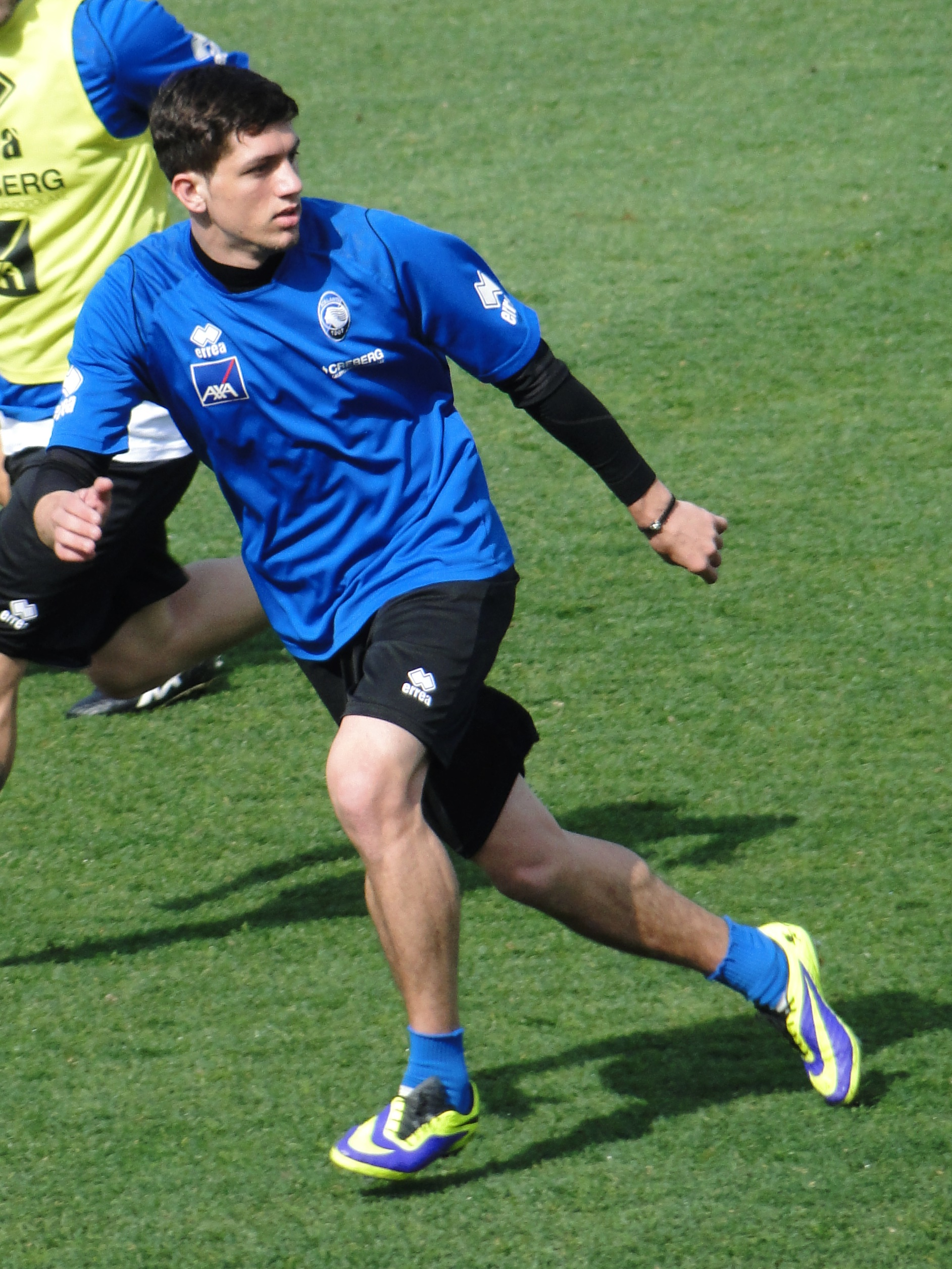

Personal information
- Date of birth: 18 March 1993 (age 33)
- Place of birth: Afumați, Romania
- Height: 1.85 m (6 ft 1 in)
- Position: Right-back

Youth career
- 1999–2012: Dinamo București

Senior career*
Years	Team	Apps	(Gls)
2010–2012	Dinamo II București	8	(0)
2012–2013	Dinamo București	22	(0)
2013–2018	Atalanta	7	(0)
2014–2015	→ Cesena (loan)	8	(0)
2015–2016	→ Avellino (loan)	22	(0)
2016–2017	→ Latina (loan)	13	(0)
2017–2018	→ Dinamo București (loan)	3	(0)
2018–2019	Dunărea Călărași	0	(0)
2019	Voluntari	2	(0)
2019–2020	Vojvodina	0	(0)
2021–2022	Dinamo București	0	(0)
2022	Pistoiese	12	(0)
Total		97	(0)

International career
2011–2012	Romania U19	6	(0)
2012–2013	Romania U21	5	(0)
2013	Romania B	1	(0)
2013	Romania	1	(0)
- * Club domestic league appearances and goals as of 31 May 2023

Constantin "Costi" Nica (born 18 March 1993) is a Romanian professional footballer who plays as a right-back.

== Club career ==
=== Dinamo București ===
Nica was born on 18 March 1993 in Afumați, Romania and began playing junior-level football in 1999 at Dinamo București. In 2010, he started to play for the team's satellite team in Liga II. He made his debut for the main squad under coach Dario Bonetti on 5 May 2012, in a 1–0 Liga I loss to CFR Cluj. The team won the 2011–12 Cupa României, but he did not play in the 1–0 victory in the final against Rapid București. Subsequently, Nica played the entire match under Bonetti during the penalty shoot-out victory against CFR Cluj in the 2012 Supercupa României. He also played in the 2–1 loss to Metalist Kharkiv in the 2012–13 Europa League play-off round.

=== Atalanta and loans ===
On 11 July 2013, Atalanta acquired 85% of the player's rights from Dinamo for a reported €1.6 million fee. He made his first-team debut under coach Stefano Colantuono on 18 August 2013, in a 3–0 Coppa Italia win against Bari. He made his Serie A debut as an 82nd-minute substitute for Cristiano Del Grosso in a 2–1 away loss to Cagliari. On 26 October, he received a red card for a tackle against Éder in a 1–0 loss to Sampdoria.

In July 2014, Atalanta sent Nica on a full-season loan to fellow Serie A club Cesena. He made his debut under coach Pierpaolo Bisoli in a 3–0 Serie A loss against Juventus, coming on as a 77th-minute substitute for Luigi Giorgi. In his second appearance, he scored an own goal in a 1–1 draw against Sampdoria. Cesena suffered relegation at the end of the season.

On 25 July 2015, Serie B club Avellino signed Nica on a full-season loan. Subsequently, he joined Latina on loan for the 2016–17 Serie B season. On 1 September 2017, Atalanta loaned him to Dinamo, the club from which he was transferred four years earlier. However, he made only three league appearances for The Red Dogs.

=== Late career ===
From 2018 to 2020, Nica had spells at Dunărea Călărași, Voluntari and Vojvodina, but made only two league appearances for Voluntari.

On 1 September 2021, Nica signed a two-year contract with Dinamo after five months in which he trained with the team. However, he made a single appearance for the club in a 2–1 loss to Argeș Pitești in the Cupa României.

On 28 January 2022, Nica returned to Italy and joined Serie C club Pistoiese. Between January and May 2022, he made 12 league appearances for them before retiring. His career performances were limited by persistent knee injuries.

== International career ==
From 2011 to 2013, Nica was consistently featured for Romania's under-19 and under-21 sides. He appeared in an unofficial friendly for Romania against Poland which ended with a 4–1 loss. Subsequently, he played one official game for Romania on 14 August 2013 when coach Victor Pițurcă sent him in the 71st minute to replace Alexandru Mățel in a 1–1 friendly draw against Slovakia.

== Honours ==
Dinamo București

- Cupa României: 2011–12
- Supercupa României: 2012
