= Cristian Bălgrădean =

Romanian footballer (born 1988)

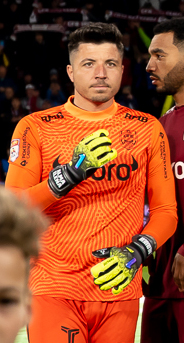
- Bălgrădean with CFR Cluj in 2022

Personal information
- Full name: Cristian Emanuel Bălgrădean
- Date of birth: 21 March 1988 (age 38)
- Place of birth: Sânnicolau Mare, Romania
- Height: 1.87 m (6 ft 2 in)
- Position: Goalkeeper

Team information
- Current team: Unirea Alba Iulia
- Number: 34

Youth career
- –2001: Unirea Sânnicolau Mare
- 2001–2003: Școala de Fotbal Helmut Duckadam
- 2003–2006: Atletico Arad

Senior career*
Years	Team	Apps	(Gls)
2006–2007	Minerul Lupeni	16	(0)
2007–2008	FC Brașov	3	(0)
2008	Liberty Salonta	17	(0)
2009–2010	Gloria Arad		
2009–2010	→ UTA Arad (loan)	27	(0)
2010–2014	Dinamo București	90	(0)
2010	→ Unirea Urziceni (loan)	4	(0)
2014–2016	Universitatea Craiova	50	(0)
2016–2018	Concordia Chiajna	68	(0)
2018–2020	FCSB	64	(0)
2020–2024	CFR Cluj	44	(0)
2024	AFC Câmpulung Muscel	5	(0)
2025–	Unirea Alba Iulia	2	(0)

International career
2007–2008	Romania U19	5	(0)
2011–2021	Romania	1	(0)
- * Club domestic league appearances and goals as of 29 March 2025

Cristian Emanuel Bălgrădean (Romanian pronunciation: [kristiˈan bəlgrəˈde̯an]; born 21 March 1988) is a Romanian professional footballer who plays as a goalkeeper for Liga III club Unirea Alba Iulia.

Since making his debut in the first division in 2010, Bălgrădean has amassed over 200 matches in the competition for Dinamo București, Universitatea Craiova, FCSB, and CFR Cluj, among others. With the former team, he won the Cupa României and the Supercupa României in 2012, and with the latter the Liga I and the Supercupa României in 2021.

Bălgrădean registered his full debut for the Romania national team in November 2011, in a 3–1 friendly victory over Greece.

== Club career ==
Bălgrădean started his career as a youngster at Helmut Duckadam football school in Arad. After the school was disbanded, he joined the junior groups of Atletico Arad. In 2005, he signed his first professional contract with Minerul Lupeni. His evolution was impressive, and he was bought by FC Brașov. In 2008, he was transferred permanently by Liberty Salonta. From the Bihor team, Bălgrădean was called to the Romania U-21 team. In 2009, he returns home to Arad, being bought by Gloria Arad, and then loaned to UTA Arad.

In June 2010 he signed a contract for five seasons with Dinamo București. He failed to gain a position in the first squad and was loaned for a season at Unirea Urziceni. In the Winter break, Bălgrădean was called back to Dinamo by Ioan Andone who decided to give him a chance in the first 11 after an injury of Emilian Dolha. He kept his position after Andone was replaced with Liviu Ciobotariu in July 2011.

Following the arrival of Dario Bonetti as head-coach, Bălgrădean initially lost his place in the first team when the Italian manager chose Kristijan Naumovski as first goalkeeper. After a while, the two players were used alternately because they both became eligible for their national teams and for a possible future transfer.

In July 2014, Bălgrădean was released by Dinamo.

On 26 August, he signed a contract with the newly promoted in Liga I, Universitatea Craiova.

On 19 February 2018, he agreed to a two-and-a-half-year deal with FCSB.

On 1 July 2020, he left FCSB to join CFR Cluj.

== International career ==
Bălgrădean became a Romania international player on 15 November 2011, when he played the full 90 minutes in a 3–1 friendly win against Greece.

== Career statistics ==
=== Club ===
As of 1 April 2025

Appearances and goals by club, season and competition
Club	Season	League			Cupa României		Cupa Ligii		Europe		Other		Total	
Club	Season	Division	Apps	Goals	Apps	Goals	Apps	Goals	Apps	Goals	Apps	Goals	Apps	Goals
Minerul Lupeni	2006–07	Liga II	16	0	0	0	—		—		—		16	0
FC Brașov	2007–08	Liga II	3	0	0	0	—		—		—		3	0
Liberty Salonta	2008–09	Liga II	17	0	0	0	—		—		—		17	0
UTA Arad (loan)	2009–10	Liga II	27	0	0	0	—		—		—		27	0
Unirea Urziceni	2010–11	Liga I	4	0	1	0	—		—		—		5	0
Dinamo București	2010–11	Liga I	10	0	3	0	—		—		—		13	0
Dinamo București	2011–12	Liga I	30	0	3	0	—		4 (Note: Appearances in UEFA Europa League)	0	—		37	0
Dinamo București	2012–13	Liga I	24	0	3	0	—		2	0	1 (Note: Appearance in Supercupa României)	0	30	0
Dinamo București	2013–14	Liga I	26	0	4	0	—		—		—		30	0
Dinamo București	Total		90	0	13	0	—		6	0	1	0	110	0
Universitatea Craiova	2014–15	Liga I	27	0	2	0	—		—		—		29	0
Universitatea Craiova	2015–16	Liga I	23	0	0	0	0	0	—		—		23	0
Universitatea Craiova	Total		50	0	2	0	—		—		—		52	0
Concordia Chiajna	2015–16	Liga I	15	0	—		3	0	—		—		18	0
Concordia Chiajna	2016–17	Liga I	35	0	1	0	2	0	—		—		38	0
Concordia Chiajna	2017–18	Liga I	18	0	0	0	—		—		—		18	0
Concordia Chiajna	Total		68	0	1	0	5	0	—		—		74	0
FCSB	2017–18	Liga I	10	0	1	0	—		—		—		11	0
FCSB	2018–19	Liga I	34	0	0	0	—		5	0	—		39	0
FCSB	2019–20	Liga I	20	0	1	0	—		2	0	—		23	0
FCSB	Total		64	0	2	0	—		7	0	—		73	0
CFR Cluj	2020–21	Liga I	26	0	0	0	—		10 (Note: Two appearances in UEFA Champions League, eight appearances in UEFA Europa League)	0	—		36	0
CFR Cluj	2021–22	Liga I	15	0	0	0	—		6 (Note: One appearance in UEFA Europa League, five appearances in UEFA Europa Conference League)	0	—		21	0
CFR Cluj	2022–23	Liga I	3	0	1	0	—		4 (Note: Two appearances in UEFA Champions League, two appearances in UEFA Europa Conference League)	0	1	0	9	0
CFR Cluj	2023–24	Liga I	0	0	0	0	—		0	0	—		0	0
CFR Cluj	Total		44	0	1	0	—		20	0	1	0	66	0
AFC Câmpulung Muscel	2024–25	Liga II	5	0	—		—		—		—		5	0
Unirea Alba Iulia	2024–25	Liga III	2	0	2	0	—		—		—		4	0
Career total			390	0	22	0	5	0	33	0	2	0	452	0

=== International ===
As of 18 November 2020

Appearances and goals by national team and year
National team	Year	Apps	Goals
Romania	2011	1	0
Total		1	0

== Honours ==
Dinamo București

- Cupa României: 2011–12
- Supercupa României: 2012

Concordia Chiajna

- Cupa Ligii runner-up: 2015–16

CFR Cluj

- Liga I: 2020–21, 2021–22
- Supercupa României: 2020
