= 2012 Cupa României final =

- Event: 2011–12 Cupa României
Rapid București	Dinamo București
0	1
- Date: 23 May 2012
- Venue: Arena Națională, Bucharest
- Man of the Match: Djakaridja Koné (Dinamo)
- Referee: Daniele Orsato (Italy)
- Attendance: 40,000

The Cupa României final was the final match of the 2011–12 Cupa României, played between Rapid București and Dinamo București. The match was played on 23 May 2012 at the Arena Națională in Bucharest. Dinamo won the match 1–0, triumphing for the 13th time in this competition while Rapid lost its 6th final.

It was the first final played on the new Arena Națională and the first in Bucharest since 2006. Adrian Scarlatache scored the only goal of the match in the 58th minute while Djakaridja Koné was named Man of the Match. Winners Dinamo faced Romanian Champions CFR Cluj, on the same stadium on 17 July in the Romanian Supercup.

== Route to the final ==
Dinamo București

Round of 32	Dinamo București	1–0	Luceafărul Oradea
Round of 16	Dinamo București	5–0	Gaz Metan Severin
Quarter-finals	Dinamo București	2–1	Petrolul Ploiești
Semifinals 1st Leg	Dinamo București	1–0	Gaz Metan Mediaș
Semifinals 2nd Leg	Gaz Metan Mediaș	2 – 1 agg.: 2–2 (a)	Dinamo București

Rapid București

Round of 32	Rapid București	4–1	Juventus București
Round of 16	Rapid București	5–0	CS Otopeni
Quarter-finals	Rapid București	2–0	Pandurii Târgu Jiu
Semifinals 1st Leg	FC Vaslui	0–1	Rapid București
Semifinals 2nd Leg	Rapid București	3 – 2 agg.: 4 – 2	FC Vaslui

== Match ==
23 May 2012
21:00 EEST

Rapid București	0–1	Dinamo București
Grigorie (yellow card) 70'; Oros (yellow card) 90+1'		58' Scarlatache; (yellow card) 68' Niculae; (yellow card) 90+5' Naumovski

Arena Națională, Bucharest
Attendance: 40,000
Referee: Daniele Orsato (Italy)

RAPID:
GK	1	(Romania) Dănuț Coman
RB	14	(Romania) Mihai Roman
CB	4	(Brazil) Marcos António (c)
CB	15	(Romania) Cristian Oros	(yellow card) 90+2'
LB	19	(Montenegro) Vladimir Božović
DM	5	(Romania) Dan Alexa		(substituted off) 79'
CM	80	(Portugal) Filipe Teixeira
CM	8	(Romania) Nicolae Grigore
RW	24	(Romania) Romeo Surdu		(substituted off) 59'
LW	7	(Romania) Ciprian Deac
FW	10	(Romania) Ovidiu Herea		(substituted off) 74'
Substitutes:
GK	82	(Romania) Cosmin Vâtcă
FW	9	(Romania) Alexandru Ioniță		(substituted in) 79'
FW	11	(Romania) Daniel Pancu		(substituted in) 74'
CB	16	(Romania) Ovidiu Burcă
RB	17	(Romania) Valentin Crețu
CM	20	(Romania) Ștefan Grigorie	(yellow card) 70'	(substituted in) 59'
DM	23	(Serbia) Miloš Pavlović
Manager:
(Romania) Răzvan Lucescu

DINAMO:
GK	23	(North Macedonia) Kristijan Naumovski	(yellow card) 90+5'
RB	24	(Romania) Srdjan Luchin
CB	21	(Romania) Dragoș Grigore
CB	30	(Romania) Cosmin Moți
LB	15	(Romania) Adrian Scarlatache
RW	20	(Romania) Alexandru Curtean
DM	5	(Burkina Faso) Djakaridja Koné
DM	26	(Romania) Laurențiu Rus
LW	10	(Romania) Marius Alexe		(substituted off) 67'
FW	9	(Romania) Marius Niculae (c)	(yellow card) 68'	(substituted off) 81'
FW	25	(Romania) Ionel Dănciulescu		(substituted off) 71'
Substitutes:
GK	34	(Romania) Cristian Bălgrădean
LB	3	(Romania) Cristian Pulhac		(substituted in) 67'
CM	7	(Romania) Cătălin Munteanu		(substituted in) 71'
CM	19	(Romania) Iulian Tameș
RW	22	(Romania) Sorin Strătilă
FW	29	(Romania) George Țucudean		(substituted in) 81'
LM	32	(Romania) Nicolae Mușat
Manager:
(Italy) Dario Bonetti

MAN OF THE MATCH

- (Burkina Faso) Djakaridja Koné (Dinamo)

MATCH OFFICIALS

- Assistant referees:
  - Nicola Andrea Nicoletti
  - Massimiliano Grilli
- Fourth official:

MATCH RULES

- 90 minutes.
- 30 minutes of extra-time if necessary.
- Penalty shoot-out if scores still level.
- Seven named substitutes.
- Maximum of three substitutions.
