= Cristian Pulhac =

Romanian footballer

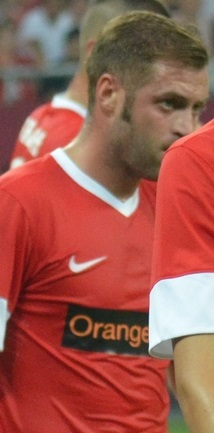

Personal information
- Full name: Corneliu Cristian Pulhac
- Date of birth: 17 August 1984 (age 42)
- Place of birth: Iași, Romania
- Height: 1.76 m (5 ft 9 in)
- Position: Left-back

Youth career
- 1991–1999: Politehnica Iași
- 1999–2002: Sporting Pitești

Senior career*
Years	Team	Apps	(Gls)
2002–2013	Dinamo București	166	(2)
2002–2003	→ Poiana Câmpina (loan)	11	(0)
2004	→ Sportul Studențesc (loan)	11	(0)
2010–2011	→ Hércules (loan)	9	(0)
2013–2014	Gabala	10	(0)
2014–2015	Zawisza Bydgoszcz	7	(0)
2015–2016	Petrolul Ploiești	7	(0)
2016	Aris Limassol	0	(0)
2017	Academica Clinceni	30	(0)
2019	CS FC Dinamo		
Total		251	(2)

International career
2005–2006	Romania U21	6	(1)
2006–2008	Romania	3	(0)
- * Club domestic league appearances and goals

Corneliu Cristian Pulhac (born 17 August 1984) is a Romanian actor and former professional footballer who played as a left-back.

== Club career ==
Pulhac was born on 17 August 1984 in Iași, Romania and began playing junior-level football in 1991 at local club Politehnica. In 1999 he moved to Sporting Pitești. He started his senior career at Dinamo București, making his Divizia A debut on 23 March 2002, when coach Marin Ion sent him in the 78th minute to replace Vlad Munteanu in a 3–0 away victory against UM Timișoara. That would remain his only appearance in that season as they won the title. In the following season, Pulhac played in Divizia C for Poiana Câmpina, then a satellite team of Dinamo, helping them gain promotion to the second league. In the 2003–04 Divizia B season, he played in the first half for Poiana and in the second half for Sportul Studențesc, earning promotion to the first league with the latter.

In 2004 he returned to Dinamo, winning the 2004–05 Cupa României, being used by coach Ioan Andone the entire match in the 1–0 victory against Farul Constanța in the final. Pulhac helped The Red Dogs win the Supercupa României for the first time, as Andone used him the full 90 minutes in the 3–2 victory against rivals Steaua București. He also played eight games in the 2005–06 UEFA Cup campaign when the team eliminated Everton with a historical 5–2 on aggregate, reaching the group stage. In the 2006–07 season he played 32 games under coach Mircea Rednic, helping Dinamo win the title. He also appeared in 12 matches, scoring one goal as the club reached the UEFA Cup round of 32 where they were eliminated with 3–1 on aggregate by Benfica. In the following season Dinamo had the objective of reaching the Champions League group stage, Pulhac providing the assist for Ionel Dănciulescu's header that opened the scoring in the 1–1 draw in the first leg of the third qualifying round against Lazio Roma. However, they did not qualify, losing with 3–1 the second leg.

In August 2010, Spanish side Hércules signed Pulhac on a season-long loan with an option to buy him permanently. There, he was teammates with David Trezeguet and Nelson Valdez. He made Primera División debut on 21 November under coach Esteban Vigo in a 3–0 away loss to Espanyol Barcelona. Pulhac played only nine matches in the competition, having to compete for a place in the team with Royston Drenthe. At the end of the season, the Spanish club did not trigger the buy-option. He returned to Dinamo, winning the 2011–12 Cupa României as coach Dario Bonetti sent him in the 67th minute to replace Marius Alexe in the 1–0 victory against Rapid București in the final. Subsequently, Bonetti used him the entire match in the penalty shoot-out victory against CFR Cluj in the 2012 Supercupa României.

In January 2013 Pulhac terminated his contract with Dinamo after receiving an offer from Azerbaijan Premier League side Gabala, for whom he went on to sign a two-year contract. Shortly after the appointment of Yuri Semin as manager, Pulhac was deemed surplus to requirements and told he could leave the club on 8 July 2013. In January 2014, Pulhac was still with Gabala and training with the youth team as he refused to leave the club. His contract with Gabala was finally terminated in August 2014. In December 2014, Pulhac signed an 18-month contract with Polish side Zawisza Bydgoszcz, becoming a teammate of compatriot Cornel Predescu. His debut in the Ekstraklasa took place on 13 February 2015 under coach Mariusz Rumak in a 0–0 draw against Górnik Łęczna. He returned to Romania in 2015, to play one season for Petrolul Ploiești in the Romanian first league, totaling 173 matches with two goals in the competition. Pulhac retired in 2017, after playing in the second league for Academica Clinceni.

== International career ==
Pulhac won six caps for Romania's under-21 team, scoring one goal. He appeared in three friendly games for Romania's senior side, making his debut under coach Victor Pițurcă on 26 May 2006 against Northern Ireland in a 2–0 win at Soldier Field in Chicago, playing 88 minutes. In 2007, he played in a 2–0 victory against Moldova. Pulhac made his last appearance for the national team on 20 August 2008 in a 1–0 win over Latvia.

== Acting career ==
After ending his football career, Pulhac transitioned to acting, appearing in TV shows like Exatlon and Stand-Up Revolution, and movies such as The Action Pack and Teambuilding.

== Career statistics ==
Appearances and goals by club, season and competition
Club	Season	League			National cup (Note: Includes Cupa României, Copa del Rey, Azerbaijan Cup)		Europe		Other		Total	
Club	Season	Division	Apps	Goals	Apps	Goals	Apps	Goals	Apps	Goals	Apps	Goals
Dinamo București	2001–02	Liga I	1	0			0	0	—		1	0
Dinamo București	2004–05	Liga I	11	2	2	0	0	0	—		13	2
Dinamo București	2005–06	Liga I	20	0	2	0	8 (Note: Appearance(s) in UEFA Cup/Europa League)	0	1 (Note: Appearance in Supercupa României)	0	31	0
Dinamo București	2006–07	Liga I	32	0	1	0	12	1	0	0	45	1
Dinamo București	2007–08	Liga I	29	0	1	0	4 (Note: Two appearances in UEFA Champions League, two appearances in UEFA Cup)	0	1	0	35	0
Dinamo București	2008–09	Liga I	10	0	0	0	2	0	—		12	0
Dinamo București	2009–10	Liga I	29	0	3	0	2	0	—		31	0
Dinamo București	2010–11	Liga I	2	0	0	0	4	1	—		6	1
Dinamo București	2011–12	Liga I	15	0	3	0	0	0	—		18	0
Dinamo București	2012–13	Liga I	17	0	2	0	1	0	1	0	21	0
Dinamo București	Total		166	2	14	0	33	2	3	0	216	4
Poiana Câmpina (loan)	2002–03	Liga III	8	0			—		—		8	0
Poiana Câmpina (loan)	2003–04	Liga II	3	0			—		—		3	0
Poiana Câmpina (loan)	Total		11	0			—		—		11	0
Sportul Studențesc (loan)	2003–04	Liga II	11	0			—		—		11	0
Hércules (loan)	2010–11	La Liga	9	0	2	0	—		—		11	0
Gabala	2012–13	Azerbaijan Premier League	10	0	2	0	—		—		12	0
Gabala	2013–14	Azerbaijan Premier League	0	0	0	0	—		—		0	0
Gabala	2014–15	Azerbaijan Premier League	0	0	0	0	0	0	—		0	0
Gabala	Total		10	0	2	0	0	0	—		12	0
Zawisza Bydgoszcz	2014–15	Ekstraklasa	7	0	—		—		—		7	0
Petrolul Ploiești	2015–16	Liga I	7	0	0	0	—		—		7	0
Aris Limassol	2016–17	Cypriot First Division	0	0	0	0	—		—		0	0
Academica Clinceni	2016–17	Liga II	13	0	0	0	—		—		13	0
Academica Clinceni	2017–18	Liga II	17	0	0	0	—		—		17	0
Academica Clinceni	Total		30	0	0	0	—		—		30	0
Career total			251	2	18	0	33	2	3	0	305	4

== Honours ==
Sportul Studențesc

- Divizia B: 2003–04

Dinamo București

- Liga I: 2001–02, 2006–07
- Cupa României: 2004–05, 2011–12
- Supercupa României: 2005, 2012

== Filmography ==
=== Film ===
- 2022 — Teambuilding as Shobbi.
- 2023 — The Action Pack as Dinica.

=== Television ===
- 2019 — Exatlon Cup — Self (Romania).
- 2022 — Stand-Up Revolution — Self / competitor (2 episodes).
