= Issa Ba =

Senegalese footballer

Personal information
- Date of birth: 7 October 1981 (age 45)
- Place of birth: Dakar, Senegal
- Height: 1.85 m (6 ft 1 in)
- Position: Midfielder

Senior career*
Years	Team	Apps	(Gls)
1998–2000	AS Police		
2000–2004	Laval	88	(11)
2004–2006	Châteauroux	58	(12)
2006–2009	Auxerre	24	(0)
2009	Terrassa	0	(0)
2010	Wisła Kraków	10	(0)
2010–2011	FCM Târgu Mureș	31	(0)
2012	Gaz Metan Mediaș	12	(0)
2012–2013	Dinamo București	7	(1)
2014–2015	ASC Diaraf		
2016–2017	Al-Shabab		
Total		230	(24)

International career
2000–2006	Senegal	18	(1)
- * Club domestic league appearances and goals

Issa Ba (born 7 October 1981) is a Senegalese former professional footballer who played as a midfielder.

== Club career ==
Ba was born on 7 October 1981 in Dakar, Senegal. He began playing football in 1998 at local club, AS Police. In 2000, he moved to the French club Laval, making his Ligue 2 debut on 18 November when coach Hervé Gauthier sent him in the 85th minute to replace Cyril Yapi in a 0–0 draw against Nancy. His following appearance took place on 3 February 2001, when he scored a goal in a 2–1 win over Le Mans. In 2004, Ba joined fellow Ligue 2 side Châteauroux. There, he played in both legs of the 2004–05 UEFA Cup where they were defeated 6–1 on aggregate by Club Brugge. In the same season, he scored a career-best seven goals in the league. Subsequently, Ba joined Auxerre in 2006, making his Ligue 1 debut on 27 August when coach Jean Fernandez sent him in the 76th minute to replace Frédéric Thomas in a 1–0 away loss to Nancy. He helped his side win the 2006 Intertoto Cup, playing in the 4–1 win against Farul Constanța in the first leg of the final. Afterwards, the team played in the 2006–07 UEFA Cup, reaching the group stage where Ba made four appearances. On 2 November 2008, he made his last Ligue 1 appearance in Auxerre's 1–0 loss to Caen, having a total of 24 matches in the competition.

In 2009, Ba joined Spanish third league team Terrassa, but did not make a single league appearance there. Then he went to play for Wisła Kraków, making his Ekstraklasa debut on 27 February 2010, as coach Maciej Skorża sent him in the 70th minute to replace Tomáš Jirsák in a 1–0 away loss to GKS Bełchatów. After 10 league appearances for Wisła, Ba switched countries again, going to Romania to join FCM Târgu Mureș. He made his Liga I debut on 4 October 2010 under coach Ioan Sabău in a 0–0 draw against Victoria Brănești. In the middle of the 2011–12 season, Ba left Târgu Mureș and signed with Gaz Metan Mediaș. In May 2012, Ba went to play for Dinamo București. In his debut, he played as a starter under coach Dario Bonetti, forming a central midfield partnership with compatriot Boubacar Mansaly during the penalty shoot-out victory against CFR Cluj in the 2012 Supercupa României. Subsequently, he played in a 2–0 home loss to Metalist Kharkiv in the 2012–13 Europa League play-off round, having a total of nine matches in European competitions (including one appearance in the Intertoto Cup). On 17 November, he scored a goal in a 1–1 draw against Viitorul Constanța. Ba made his last Liga I appearance on 23 November 2012 in a 2–1 home win over Oțelul Galați, totaling 50 matches with one goal in the competition. In 2014, he returned to Senegal to play for ASC Diaraf. Afterwards, Ba joined Kuwait Premier League side Al-Shabab where he ended his career in 2017.

== International career ==
Ba made his debut for Senegal on 9 July 2000 under coach Peter Schnittger in a 0–0 draw against Egypt in the 2002 World Cup qualifiers. Subsequently, he played in a 1–0 loss to Togo during the 2002 African Cup of Nations qualifiers. Then he made six appearances during the 2006 World Cup qualifiers. Coach Abdoulaye Sarr selected Ba to be part of the 2006 Africa Cup of Nations squad where he made five appearances and scored once in the 2–0 group stage victory against Zimbabwe. Senegal reached the semi-finals where they were defeated 2–1 by Egypt. Ba made his last appearance for the national team on 1 March 2006 in a 2–1 friendly win against Norway, having a total of 18 matches with one goal for the Lions of Teranga.

== Career statistics ==
Score and result list Senegal's goal tally first, score column indicates score after Ba goal.

International goal scored by Issa Ba
No.	Date	Venue	Opponent	Score	Result	Competition
1	23 January 2006	Port Said Stadium, Port Said, Egypt	Zimbabwe	2–0	2–0	2006 Africa Cup of Nations

== Honours ==
Auxerre

- Intertoto Cup: 2008

Dinamo București

- Supercupa României: 2012
