= Sorin Strătilă =

Romanian footballer

Personal information
- Full name: Sorin Daniel Strătilă
- Date of birth: 20 October 1986 (age 40)
- Place of birth: Brașov, Romania
- Height: 1.77 m (5 ft 10 in)
- Position: Right midfielder

Team information
- Current team: Focșani
- Number: 9

Youth career
- 2000–2005: FC Brașov

Senior career*
Years	Team	Apps	(Gls)
2005–2008	Euro Africa Bușteni	0	(0)
2006–2007	→ Inter Gaz (loan)	3	(0)
2007–2008	→ Royal Ghimbav (loan)	27	(5)
2008–2009	Steaua II București	0	(0)
2009–2011	Astra Ploiești	76	(3)
2012–2014	Dinamo București	21	(1)
2013–2014	→ Concordia Chiajna (loan)	18	(0)
2014–2017	UTA Arad	79	(10)
2018	SR Brașov	28	(12)
2019–2020	Olimpic Cetate Râșnov	31	(3)
2021–2022	Focșani	30	(2)
2022–2023	CS Dinamo	0	(0)
2023–	CSM Săcele	0	(0)

International career^{‡}
2011	Romania	1	(0)
- * Club domestic league appearances and goals as of 07:17, 21 June 2022 (UTC) ‡ National team caps and goals as of 31 July 2011

Sorin Daniel Strătilă (born 20 October 1986) is a Romanian footballer who plays as a right midfielder for Liga III club CSM Focșani.

== Club career ==
=== Early career ===
Strătilă signed his first professional contract in July 2005, with Euro Africa Football School from Buşteni. He was then loaned to some smaller teams like Inter Gaz București and Royal Ghimbav.

=== Steaua II București ===
He was bought to Steaua's second team in 2008, but later he was released, under the spell of Marius Lăcătuş who considered the Strătilă could not ever be a good player. To get rid of him, even if the player had the support of the ownership, Lăcătuş claimed that he was too old for the first team. The coach said that he didn't need a 25-year-old player, though Strătilă was only 21 at that time.

=== Astra Ploieşti ===
In the Summer of 2009, Strătilă arrived at Astra Ploieşti as a free agent. He soon became a first team player and in August 2011 he was call to the national team.

=== Dinamo București ===
In January 2012, Strătilă was transferred to Dinamo București. He signed a contract for four years, until December 2015. Strătilă scored his first goal for Dinamo in a game against FC Vaslui, on 18 May 2013. Dinamo lost that match, 4–1.

=== Loan to Concordia Chiajna ===
In August 2013, Strătilă was loaned out at fellow Liga I team Concordia Chiajna.

=== UTA ===
In 2014, Strătilă was released by Dinamo and in October he signed a contract with UTA, in Liga III.

== International career ==
He made his debut for Romania on 10 August 2011, against San Marino.

== Honours ==
=== Club ===
Dinamo București

- Romanian Cup: 2011–12
- Romanian Supercup: 2012
