= Srdjan Luchin =

Romanian footballer (born 1986)

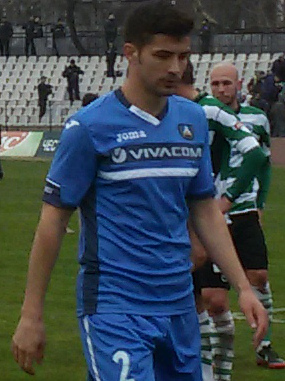

Personal information
- Date of birth: 4 March 1986 (age 40)
- Place of birth: Variaș, Romania
- Height: 1.85 m (6 ft 1 in)
- Position: Defender

Team information
- Current team: ASU Politehnica Timișoara U18 (head coach)

Youth career
- –1998: Steaua Roșie Variaș
- 1999–2001: LPS Banatul Timișoara
- 2001–2003: Sporting Pitești

Senior career*
Years	Team	Apps	(Gls)
2003–2004	FC Baia Mare	21	(1)
2004–2006	Olimpia Satu Mare	10	(0)
2006–2007	Politehnica II Timișoara	38	(4)
2006–2011	Politehnica Timișoara	88	(5)
2011–2013	Dinamo București	66	(2)
2014	Botev Plovdiv	14	(1)
2014–2015	Steaua București	9	(0)
2015	ACS Poli Timișoara	17	(3)
2016–2017	Levski Sofia	23	(0)
2017–2018	CFR Cluj	3	(0)
2018	Viitorul Constanța	13	(1)
2019	Dunărea Călărași	19	(1)
2019–2020	Hermannstadt	23	(0)
2020–2021	Universitatea Cluj	20	(0)
Total		364	(18)

International career
2008–2009	Romania U21	4	(0)
2011–2014	Romania	11	(1)

Managerial career
- 2022: ASU Politehnica Timișoara (youth)
- 2022–2023: ASU Politehnica Timișoara (assistant)
- 2023: Timișul Șag (assistant)
- 2023–2024: Timișul Șag
- 2024–2025: Dumbrăvița (youth)
- 2025–: ASU Politehnica Timișoara U18
- * Club domestic league appearances and goals

Srdjan Luchin (Serbian: Срђан Лукин, romanized: Srđan Lukin; born 4 March 1986) is a Romanian former professional footballer, who played as a defender, currently head coach at ASU Politehnica Timișoara U18.

== Club career ==
=== Politehnica Timișoara ===
Luchin made his Liga I debut in 2007 against Dinamo București, the game ended 1–1.

=== Dinamo București ===
Dinamo București announced the transfer of Luchin in August 2011. The player signed a contract for 5 years with the club. Manager Liviu Ciobotariu introduced Luchin immediately in the first squad as right defender. He scored his first goal for Dinamo in a Romanian Cup game against Luceafărul Oradea. Luchin was chosen man of the match for his performance.

=== Botev Plovdiv ===
Luchin arrived in Botev Plovdiv on 11 January 2014, signing a contract for two and a half years with the club.

=== Steaua București ===
On 5 August 2014, Luchin signed a two-year contract with Steaua București.

=== Levski Sofia ===
Luchin signed a one-and-a-half-year contract with Levski Sofia in January 2016. His contract was not renewed and he left the club in May 2017.

== International career ==
Luchin played 11 matches and scored one goal for Romania, making his international debut on 10 August 2011, when he came as a substitute and replaced Bănel Nicoliță in the 80th minute of a friendly which ended with a 1–0 victory against San Marino. He played in two matches at the Euro 2012 qualifiers against France which ended 0–0 and in a 1–1 in Tirana, against Albania, in which he scored his only goal for the national team, thus becoming the first player of Serbian descent since 2008 to score a goal against the Albanian team. Luchin's last appearance for the national team was on 18 November 2014 in a friendly which ended with a 2–0 victory against Denmark.

== Personal life ==
Luchin was born in a family of Serbian ethnicity in the village of Variaș, Timiș County.

== Career statistics ==
=== Club ===
Appearances and goals by club, season and competition
Club	Season	League			National cup (Note: Includes Cupa României, Bulgarian Cup)		League cup (Note: Includes Cupa Ligii)		Europe		Other		Total	
Club	Season	Division	Apps	Goals	Apps	Goals	Apps	Goals	Apps	Goals	Apps	Goals	Apps	Goals
FC Baia Mare	2003–04	Divizia B	21	1	—		—		—		—		21	1
Olimpia Satu Mare	2004–05	Divizia B	6	0	—		—		—		—		6	0
Olimpia Satu Mare	2005–06	Divizia B	4	0	—		—		—		—		4	0
Olimpia Satu Mare	Total		10	0	—		—		—		—		10	0
Poli II Timișoara	2006–07	Liga II	24	2	3	1	—		—		—		27	3
Poli II Timișoara	2007–08	Liga II	14	2	—		—		—		—		14	2
Poli II Timișoara	Total		38	4	3	1	—		—		—		41	5
Politehnica Timișoara	2006–07	Liga I	2	0	0	0	—		—		—		2	0
Politehnica Timișoara	2007–08	Liga I	15	1	0	0	—		—		—		15	1
Politehnica Timișoara	2008–09	Liga I	23	1	5	0	—		2 (Note: Appearance(s) in UEFA Cup/UEFA Europa League)	0	—		30	1
Politehnica Timișoara	2009–10	Liga I	19	1	1	0	—		—		—		20	1
Politehnica Timișoara	2010–11	Liga I	27	2	3	0	—		3	0	—		33	2
Politehnica Timișoara	2011–12	Liga I	2	0	1	0	—		—		—		3	0
Politehnica Timișoara	Total		88	5	10	0	–		5	0	—		103	5
Dinamo București	2011–12	Liga I	24	0	6	2	—		—		—		30	2
Dinamo București	2012–13	Liga I	29	1	3	0	—		2	0	1 (Note: Appearance in Supercupa României)	0	35	1
Dinamo București	2013–14	Liga I	13	1	2	0	—		—		—		15	1
Dinamo București	Total		66	2	11	2	—		2	0	1	0	80	4
Botev Plovdiv	2013–14	A PFG	12	1	5	0	—		—		—		17	1
Botev Plovdiv	2014–15	A PFG	2	0	0	0	—		2	0	0	0	4	0
Botev Plovdiv	Total		14	1	5	0	0	0	2	0	0	0	21	1
Steaua București	2014–15	Liga I	9	0	4	0	3	0	1	0	0	0	17	0
ACS Poli Timișoara	2015–16	Liga I	17	3	2	0	1	0	—		—		20	3
Levski Sofia	2015–16	A PFG	11	0	0	0	—		—		—		11	0
Levski Sofia	2016–17	A PFG	12	0	0	0	—		—		—		12	0
Levski Sofia	Total		23	0	0	0	—		—		—		23	0
CFR Cluj	2017–18	Liga I	3	0	1	0	—		—		—		4	0
Viitorul Constanța	2018–19	Liga I	13	1	2	0	—		1	0	—		16	1
Dunărea Călărași	2018–19	Liga I	19	1	0	0	—		—		—		19	1
Hermannstadt	2019–20	Liga I	23	0	2	0	—		—		—		25	0
Universitatea Cluj	2020–21	Liga II	20	0	2	0	—		—		—		22	0
Career total			364	18	42	3	4	0	11	0	1	0	422	21

=== International ===
Appearances and goals by national team and year
National team	Year	Apps	Goals
Romania
Romania	2011	4	1
Romania	2012	1	0
Romania	2013	2	0
Romania	2014	3	0
Total		10	1

Scores and results list Romania's goal tally first, score column indicates score after each Luchin goal.

List of international goals scored by Srdjan Luchin
No.	Date	Venue	Opponent	Score	Result	Competition
1	11 October 2011	Qemal Stafa Stadium, Tirana, Albania	Albania	1–1	1–1	UEFA Euro 2012 qualifying

== Honours ==
Politehnica Timișoara

- Cupa României runner-up: 2006–07, 2008–09

Dinamo București

- Cupa României: 2011–12
- Supercupa României: 2012

Botev Plovdiv

- Bulgarian Cup runner-up: 2013–14

Steaua București

- Liga I: 2014–15
- Cupa României: 2014–15
- Cupa Ligii: 2014-15

CFR Cluj

- Liga I: 2017–18
