= Boubacar Mansaly =

Senegalese footballer

Personal information
- Date of birth: 4 February 1988 (age 38)
- Place of birth: Guédiawaye, Senegal
- Height: 1.74 m (5 ft 9 in)
- Position: Defensive midfielder

Youth career
- 2005–2006: ASC Yeggo

Senior career*
| Years | Team | Apps | (Gls) |
| 2006–2011 | Saint-Étienne II | 100 | (6) |
| 2009–2010 | Saint-Étienne | 1 | (0) |
| 2011–2012 | JA Drancy | 17 | (4) |
| 2012–2015 | Dinamo București | 72 | (3) |
| 2015–2017 | Astra Giurgiu | 32 | (0) |
| 2017 | BB Erzurumspor | 9 | (0) |
| 2018 | Salam Zgharta | 11 | (0) |
| 2019 | Atyrau | 7 | (0) |
| 2020–2021 | Spotlights | | |
| 2021–2022 | Abu Salem | | |
| Total | | 249 | (13) |
- * Club domestic league appearances and goals

Boubacar Mansaly (born 4 February 1988) is a Senegalese former professional footballer who played as a midfielder.

== Career ==
Mansaly was born on 4 February 1988 in Guédiawaye, Senegal and began playing junior-level football in 2005 at ASC Yeggo. In January 2006, he went for a five-season spell to French side Saint-Étienne, but played mostly for the satellite team in the lower leagues. Mansaly made his debut for the first team on 15 August 2009 in Ligue 1, as coach Alain Perrin used him the entire match in a 3–1 away loss against Toulouse. His second and final appearance for Saint-Étienne was in a 3–1 loss to Lens in the 2009–10 Coupe de France quarter-finals. Afterwards he went to play for the 2011–12 season at fourth league side, JA Drancy.

In the summer of 2012, Mansaly joined Romanian club Dinamo București, where coach Dario Bonetti wanted him as Djakaridja Koné's replacement. In his debut, he played the entire match under Bonetti, forming a central midfield partnership with compatriot Issa Ba during the penalty shoot-out victory against CFR Cluj in the 2012 Supercupa României, and his performance was highly regarded. He also started playing in European competitions, appearing in both legs of the 4–1 aggregate loss to Metalist Kharkiv in the 2012–13 Europa League play-off round. On 23 August 2013, Mansaly scored his first goal in a 6–0 victory against Universitatea Cluj, and on 13 December he netted another goal and provided an assist for Dorin Rotariu in a 4–0 win over ACS Poli Timișoara. Subsequently, on 21 November 2014, he scored his last goal for The Red Dogs in a 2–1 win against Gaz Metan Mediaș.

In September 2015, Mansaly signed a two-season contract with Astra Giurgiu. In the first season, he played 13 league games under coach Marius Șumudică, as the team won the title. Subsequently, he played six games in the 2016–17 Europa League campaign, as Astra reached the round of 32, where they were defeated by Genk. The club also reached the 2017 Cupa României final, but coach Șumudică did not use him in the loss to FC Voluntari. On 13 May 2017, in the last round of the season, he made his last Liga I appearance in a 1–1 draw against his former team, Dinamo, totaling 104 matches with three goals in the competition.

In 2017, Mansaly left Romania to go play for Turkish second league team BB Erzurumspor. Subsequently, he moved to Lebanon at Salam Zgharta. Afterwards he joined Kazakhstan side Atyrau. There, he reached the 2019 Kazakhstan Cup final, where coach Kuanysh Karakulov sent him in the 74th minute to replace Mikhail Gabyshev, but got replaced in the 113th minute with Ivan Antipov in the 2–1 loss after extra time to Kaysar Kyzylorda. In 2020, Mansaly returned to Africa, playing first in Nigeria for Spotlights and then in Libya for Abu Salem, where he retired in 2022.

== Honours ==
Dinamo București

- Supercupa României: 2012

Astra Giurgiu

- Liga I: 2015–16
- Cupa României runner-up: 2016–17

Atyrau

- Kazakhstan Cup runner-up: 2019
