= Marius Alexe =

Romanian footballer (born 1990)

Personal information
- Full name: Marius Silviu Alexe
- Date of birth: 22 February 1990 (age 36)
- Place of birth: Bucharest, Romania
- Height: 1.86 m (6 ft 1 in)
- Position: Forward

Team information
- Current team: Dinamo București U18 (head coach)

Youth career
- 2000–2007: Dinamo București

Senior career*
Years	Team	Apps	(Gls)
2006–2010	Dinamo București II (Note: The statistics for the 2006–07 Liga III season are unavailable.)	24	(4)
2008–2015	Dinamo București	135	(36)
2008–2009	→ Astra Ploiești (loan)	26	(8)
2013–2014	→ Sassuolo (loan)	6	(0)
2015–2017	Karabükspor	32	(7)
2017	→ Podbrezová (loan)	1	(0)
2017	Aris Limassol	9	(0)
2018	Karabükspor	5	(1)
2019	Concordia Chiajna	8	(0)
2019	Argeș Pitești	5	(1)
Total		251	(57)

International career
2006–2007	Romania U17	6	(1)
2008–2009	Romania U19	8	(2)
2009–2012	Romania U21	10	(2)
2011–2013	Romania	7	(0)

Managerial career
- 2026–: Dinamo București U18
- * Club domestic league appearances and goals

Marius Silviu Alexe (born 22 February 1990) is a Romanian former professional footballer who played as forward, currently head coach at Dinamo București U18.

== Club career ==
=== Dinamo București and loans ===
Alexe was born on 22 February 1990 in Bucharest, Romania and began playing junior-level football at age 10 in 2000 at local club Dinamo. He started to play at senior level for Dinamo's satellite club during the 2005–06 Divizia B season. At age 16, Alexe went on a trial at Scottish club Rangers, but despite leaving a good impression, he did not sign a contract because Dinamo demanded a €250,000 transfer fee. Other clubs such as Arsenal and Fiorentina showed interest in signing him, but he remained at Dinamo.

Alexe was loaned by Dinamo to Astra Ploiești for the 2008–09 Liga II season in which he scored six goals to help the team gain promotion to the first league. Subsequently, he made his Liga I debut on 2 August 2009 under coach Ion Moldovan in a 1–0 home loss to Pandurii Târgu Jiu. On 29 August, he netted a brace in a 3–1 victory against Rapid București and shortly after that match, he was brought back by Dinamo.

Alexe played five matches for Dinamo in the 2009–10 Europa League group stage. During the same season, he opened the scoring in a 2–0 win over rivals Steaua București and netted another goal in a 2–2 derby draw against Rapid. Dinamo reached the 2011 Cupa României final, where Alexe played the entire match under coach Ioan Andone in the 2–1 loss to Steaua. His performances attracted the attention of Chelsea, but Dinamo demanded €5 million for the player and the transaction failed. In April 2012, he netted two doubles in two victories against Concordia Chiajna and Ceahlăul Piatra Neamț. Afterwards, he helped Dinamo win the 2011–12 Cupa României by playing as a starter under coach Dario Bonetti before being substituted by Cristian Pulhac in the 67th minute of the 1–0 victory against Rapid in the final. He then won the 2012 Supercupa României, playing the whole game under Bonetti in the penalty shoot-out victory against CFR Cluj, in which Alexe netted his spot kick. During the 2012–13 season, he scored a career-best 15 goals. Among these goals were three doubles in three victories against Rapid, FC Brașov and Gloria Bistrița, and one goal in a 3–1 loss to Steaua.

In July 2013, Alexe was loaned by Dinamo for one year to Sassuolo for a €500,000 fee with an option to make the deal permanent for €2 million. He made his Serie A debut on 25 August 2013, when coach Eusebio Di Francesco sent him in the 65th minute to replace Gaetano Masucci in a 2–0 away loss to Torino. He injured himself during a training session in January 2014, suffering a tear of the anterior cruciate ligament of the left knee which forced him to take a six-month break.

Alexe came back to Dinamo and his first match took place on 30 August 2014 in a 2–1 home win over FC Brașov. In September, he scored three goals in three consecutive matches which were a loss to FC Botoșani and victories against CSMS Iași and Rapid.

=== Kardemir Karabükspor, Podbrezová and Aris Limassol ===
On 22 July 2015, Alexe was transferred from Dinamo to second-tier Turkish club Kardemir Karabükspor for a €200,000 fee. He scored a goal on his debut in a 3–2 victory against Giresunspor. He netted seven goals until the end of the season, including a double in a 3–0 win over Kayseri Erciyesspor, helping the team gain promotion to the first league. Subsequently, Alexe made his Süper Lig debut on 28 January 2017, when coach Igor Tudor sent him in the 81st minute to replace İlhan Depe in a 1–0 loss to Çaykur Rizespor. Shortly afterwards, he was loaned by Karabükspor to Podbrezová. However, he made a single appearance in the Slovak league on 18 February, as coach Marek Fabuľa used him for the first 85 minutes of a 0–0 draw against DAC Dunajská Streda. During his time with Karabükspor, he was teammates with fellow Romanians Ionuț Neagu, Gabriel Iancu, Valerică Găman, Cristian Tănase, Iasmin Latovlevici and Paul Papp.

On 31 August 2017, Alexe went to play for Aris Limassol, where he became teammates with compatriots Bănel Nicoliță, Alexandru Ioniță and Andrei Radu. Alexe made his Cypriot First Division debut on 1 October 2017, when coach Nikolas Martides sent him in the 67th minute to substitute Christer Youssef in a 2–1 away loss to Doxa Katokopias. He made nine goalless appearances for the team until the end of the year. In January 2018, Alexe went back to Kardemir Karabükspor. He scored his first Süper Lig goal with a header on 3 February in a 1–0 victory against Alanyaspor. That was his only goal scored in his six matches played in the Turkish top-tier.

=== Concordia Chiajna and Argeș Pitești ===
On 6 February 2019, Concordia Chiajna announced that Alexe signed a contract with the club. During this stint, he made his last Liga I appearances, totaling 146 matches with 38 goals in the competition. However, he could not avoid the team's relegation to the second league at the end of the 2018–19 season. In September 2019, Alexe moved to Liga II club Argeș Pitești, where he stayed until December, retiring afterwards.

== International career ==
From 2006 to 2012, Alexe was consistently featured for Romania's under-17, under-19 and under-21 sides. Notably, with the latter, he finished first in the group for the 2011 European Under-21 Championship qualifiers before reaching a play-off, where they were defeated 2–1 on aggregate by England U21, who advanced to the final tournament.

Alexe played seven matches for Romania, making his debut on 29 September 2011, when coach Răzvan Lucescu sent him in the 84th minute to replace Adrian Mutu in a 3–1 victory against Luxembourg in the Euro 2012 qualifiers. During those qualifiers, he also played in a 3–0 win over Bosnia and Herzegovina. His last five appearances for the national team were in friendlies, with the last one being a 3–2 victory against Australia which took place on 6 February 2013.

== Style of play ==
In a 2026 interview for Fanatik, Alexe described his own style of play as follows: "Yes, I was a number 10 who could play as a number 9—even though I started out as a winger. But as the years went by and I gained experience, I think the striker position suited me better. (...) Early on, I think playing as a winger suited me very well. In fact, when I was transferred to Italy, I was signed as a winger. But later on, the joy of scoring goals—so to speak—is what I think turned me into a striker. (...) Speed was my number one attribute. Later on, I improved my technique. Through training, I managed to develop." Ion Nunweiller compared him to Florea Dumitrache from the time Alexe was a junior at Dinamo București.

== Career statistics ==
=== Club ===
Appearances and goals by club, season and competition
Club	Season	League			National cup (Note: Includes Cupa României, Coppa Italia, Turkish Cup)		Europe		Other		Total	
Club	Season	Division	Apps	Goals	Apps	Goals	Apps	Goals	Apps	Goals	Apps	Goals
Dinamo II București	2005–06	Divizia B	1	0	–		–		–		1	0
Dinamo II București	2006–07	Liga III			–		–		–			
Dinamo II București	2007–08	Liga II	20	3	–		–		–		20	3
Dinamo II București	2008–09	Liga II	1	0	–		–		–		1	0
Dinamo II București	2010–11	Liga II	2	1	–		–		–		2	1
Dinamo II București	Total		24	4	0	0	0	0	0	0	24	4
Astra Ploiești (loan)	2008–09	Liga II	23	6	0	0	–		–		26	6
Astra Ploiești (loan)	2009–10	Liga I	3	2	–		–		–		3	2
Astra Ploiești (loan)	Total		26	8	0	0	0	0	0	0	26	8
Dinamo București	2009–10	Liga I	25	5	1	0	5 (Note: Appearances in UEFA Europa League)	0	–		31	5
Dinamo București	2010–11	Liga I	25	5	5	3	0	0	–		30	8
Dinamo București	2011–12	Liga I	27	5	4	0	3	0	–		34	5
Dinamo București	2012–13	Liga I	31	15	2	2	2	0	1 (Note: Appearance in Supercupa României)	0	36	17
Dinamo București	2014–15	Liga I	26	6	2	0	–		1 (Note: Appearance in Cupa Ligii)	0	29	6
Dinamo București	2015–16	Liga I	1	0	–		–		–		1	0
Dinamo București	Total		135	36	14	5	10	0	1	0	160	41
Sassuolo (loan)	2013–14	Serie A	6	0	2	0	–		–		8	0
Karabükspor	2015–16	TFF 1. Lig	31	7	3	1	–		–		34	8
Karabükspor	2016–17	Süper Lig	1	0	0	0	–		–		1	0
Karabükspor	2017–18	Süper Lig	5	1	–		–		–		5	1
Karabükspor	2018–19	TFF 1. Lig	0	0	0	0	–		–		0	0
Karabükspor	Total		37	8	3	1	0	0	0	0	40	9
Podbrezová (loan)	2016–17	Slovak First League	1	0	–		–		–		1	0
Aris Limassol	2017–18	Cypriot First Division	9	0	0	0	–		–		9	0
Concordia Chiajna	2018–19	Liga I	8	0	–		–		–		8	0
Concordia Chiajna	2019–20	Liga II	0	0	0	0	–		–		0	0
Concordia Chiajna	Total		8	0	0	0	0	0	0	0	8	0
Argeș Pitești	2019–20	Liga II	5	1	–		–		–		5	1
Career total			251	57	19	6	10	0	2	0	282	63

=== International ===
Appearances and goals by national team and year
National team	Year	Apps	Goals
Romania	2011	4	0
Romania	2012	2	0
Romania	2013	1	0
Total		7	0

== Honours ==
Dinamo București II

- Liga III: 2006–07

Dinamo București

- Cupa României: 2011–12, runner-up 2010–11
- Supercupa României: 2012
