= Cosmin Matei =

Romanian footballer (born 1991)

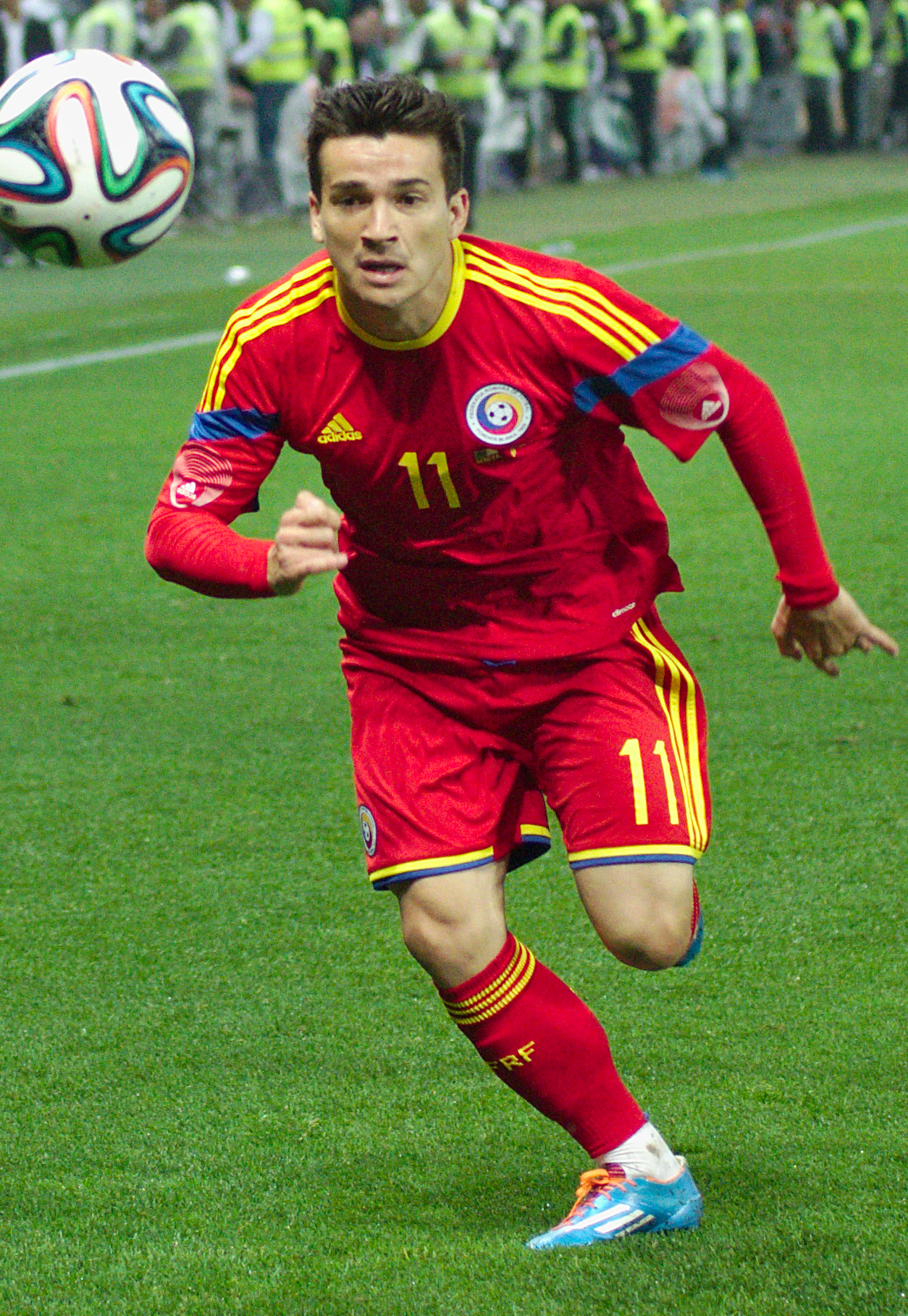
- Matei with Romania in 2014

Personal information
- Full name: Cosmin Gabriel Matei
- Date of birth: 30 September 1991 (age 35)
- Place of birth: Târgoviște, Romania
- Height: 1.75 m (5 ft 9 in)
- Positions: Attacking midfielder; winger

Team information
- Current team: Sepsi OSK
- Number: 10

Youth career
- 2001–2005: FCM Târgoviște
- 2005–2008: Farul Constanța

Senior career*
| Years | Team | Apps | (Gls) |
| 2008–2010 | Farul Constanța | 35 | (4) |
| 2010–2011 | Steaua București | 5 | (0) |
| 2011 | Astra Ploiești | 6 | (1) |
| 2012–2016 | Dinamo București | 109 | (20) |
| 2016 | Atromitos | 11 | (1) |
| 2016–2019 | Gençlerbirliği | 28 | (1) |
| 2018 | → Istra 1961 (loan) | 14 | (3) |
| 2019–2021 | Viitorul Constanța | 56 | (5) |
| 2021–2022 | Dinamo București | 20 | (2) |
| 2022– | Sepsi OSK | 122 | (20) |

International career
| 2008–2009 | Romania U17 | 4 | (1) |
| 2009–2010 | Romania U19 | 9 | (2) |
| 2011–2012 | Romania U21 | 8 | (1) |
| 2014 | Romania | 2 | (0) |
- * Club domestic league appearances and goals as of 2 August 2026

Cosmin Gabriel Matei (Romanian pronunciation: [kosˈmin gabriˈel maˈtej]; born 30 September 1991) is a Romanian professional footballer who plays as an attacking midfielder or a winger for Liga I club Sepsi OSK, which he captains.

Matei started out his senior career at Farul Constanța in 2008, and has since represented Steaua București, Astra Ploiești, Dinamo București, Viitorul Constanța and Sepsi OSK in his country. Abroad, he competed for teams in Greece, Turkey and Croatia, respectively.

Internationally, Matei earned caps for Romania at under-17, under-19 and under-21 levels, before making his full debut in May 2014.

== Club career ==
=== Farul Constanța ===
Matei made his Liga I debut for Farul Constanța on 18 October 2008, in a match against Politehnica Timișoara.

=== Steaua București ===
Matei was transferred to Steaua București in July 2010. On 22 August, he recorded his league debut by coming on as a 85th-minute substitute for Romeo Surdu in a 3–0 win over Vaslui.

On 4 September 2010, Matei made his debut for Steaua's reserves in a Liga II game against Juventus București, entering in the 17th minute as they won 1–0.

=== Astra Ploiești ===
In June 2011, Matei was transferred to Astra Ploiești. He did not impress during his stint in Prahova County, appearing in only five matches without scoring.

=== Dinamo București ===
In August 2012, Matei penned down a five-year contract with Dinamo București, the cross-town rival of his former club Steaua. He scored his first goal in a game against Universitatea Cluj, on 2 May that year.

=== Atromitos ===
In January 2016, Matei moved abroad for the first time after joining Greek club Atromitos for an undisclosed transfer fee.

=== Gençlerbirliği ===
On 10 August 2016, Süper Lig side Gençlerbirliği announced the signing of Matei on a three-year deal.

=== Viitorul Constanța ===
On 26 August 2019, Matei returned to Romania by agreeing to a two-year contract with Viitorul Constanța.

=== Return to Dinamo București ===
In September 2021, Matei returned to Dinamo București as one of the experienced players in a youth-oriented squad. After several unconvincing performances, he was excluded from the first team in December 2021 by manager Mircea Rednic. He resumed trainings the following month after Rednic's dismissal, but Dinamo continued its poor results which led to the first relegation in the club history.

Matei became the first player to depart Dinamo after the relegation, only three days after featuring 73 minutes in the decisive promotion/relegation play-off match against Universitatea Cluj.

=== Sepsi OSK ===
On 2 June 2022, shortly after Dinamo București's relegation, Matei remained in the Liga I by signing a two-year contract with Sepsi OSK. He made his debut on 9 July, in a 2–1 victory over CFR Cluj in the Supercupa României.

== International career ==
Matei made his debut for the Romania national team in a friendly against Albania played in Switzerland, in May 2014.

== Career statistics ==
=== Club ===
As of match played 2 August 2026

Appearances and goals by club, season and competition
| Club | Season | League | | | National cup (Note: Includes Cupa României, Greek Cup, Turkish Cup) | | Continental | | Other | | Total | |
| Club | Season | Division | Apps | Goals | Apps | Goals | Apps | Goals | Apps | Goals | Apps | Goals |
|---|---|---|---|---|---|---|---|---|---|---|---|---|
| Farul Constanța | 2008–09 | Liga I | 12 | 0 | 1 | 0 | — | | — | | 13 | 0 |
| Farul Constanța | 2009–10 | Liga II | 23 | 4 | 0 | 0 | — | | — | | 23 | 4 |
| Farul Constanța | Total | | 35 | 4 | 1 | 0 | 0 | 0 | 0 | 0 | 36 | 4 |
| Steaua București | 2010–11 | Liga I | 5 | 0 | 2 | 0 | 2 (Note: Appearances in UEFA Europa League) | 0 | — | | 9 | 0 |
| Astra Ploiești | 2011–12 | Liga I | 6 | 1 | 1 | 0 | — | | — | | 7 | 1 |
| Dinamo București | 2011–12 | Liga I | 7 | 2 | 1 | 0 | — | | — | | 8 | 2 |
| Dinamo București | 2012–13 | Liga I | 28 | 5 | 1 | 0 | 2 | 0 | 1 (Note: Appearance in Supercupa României) | 0 | 32 | 5 |
| Dinamo București | 2013–14 | Liga I | 29 | 8 | 3 | 1 | — | | — | | 32 | 9 |
| Dinamo București | 2014–15 | Liga I | 26 | 3 | 1 | 0 | — | | 2 (Note: Appearances in Cupa Ligii) | 0 | 29 | 3 |
| Dinamo București | 2015–16 | Liga I | 19 | 2 | 2 | 0 | — | | 2 | 0 | 23 | 2 |
| Dinamo București | Total | | 109 | 20 | 8 | 1 | 2 | 0 | 5 | 0 | 124 | 21 |
| Atromitos | 2015–16 | Super League Greece | 11 | 1 | 3 | 0 | — | | — | | 14 | 1 |
| Gençlerbirliği | 2016–17 | Süper Lig | 12 | 1 | 4 | 0 | — | | — | | 16 | 1 |
| Gençlerbirliği | 2018–19 | TFF 1. Lig | 16 | 0 | 4 | 2 | — | | — | | 20 | 2 |
| Gençlerbirliği | Total | | 28 | 1 | 8 | 2 | 0 | 0 | 0 | 0 | 36 | 3 |
| Istra 1961 (loan) | 2017–18 | 1. HNL | 14 | 3 | — | | — | | — | | 14 | 3 |
| Viitorul Constanța | 2019–20 | Liga I | 23 | 4 | 1 | 0 | — | | — | | 24 | 4 |
| Viitorul Constanța | 2020–21 | Liga I | 33 | 1 | 1 | 0 | — | | — | | 34 | 1 |
| Viitorul Constanța | Total | | 56 | 5 | 2 | 0 | 0 | 0 | 0 | 0 | 58 | 5 |
| Dinamo București | 2021–22 | Liga I | 20 | 2 | 2 | 1 | — | | 2 (Note: Appearances in Liga I promotion/relegation play-offs) | 0 | 24 | 3 |
| Sepsi OSK | 2022–23 | Liga I | 35 | 6 | 5 | 2 | 4 (Note: Appearances in UEFA Europa Conference League) | 1 | 1 | 1 | 45 | 10 |
| Sepsi OSK | 2023–24 | Liga I | 29 | 5 | 2 | 1 | 5 | 2 | 1 | 0 | 37 | 8 |
| Sepsi OSK | 2024–25 | Liga I | 27 | 3 | 0 | 0 | — | | — | | 27 | 3 |
| Sepsi OSK | 2025–26 | Liga II | 28 | 5 | 3 | 0 | — | | — | | 31 | 5 |
| Sepsi OSK | 2026–27 | Liga I | 3 | 1 | 0 | 0 | — | | — | | 3 | 1 |
| Sepsi OSK | Total | | 122 | 20 | 10 | 3 | 9 | 3 | 2 | 1 | 143 | 27 |
| Career total | | | 406 | 57 | 37 | 7 | 13 | 3 | 9 | 1 | 465 | 68 |

=== International ===
As of match played 4 June 2014

Appearances and goals by national team and year
| National team | Year | Apps | Goals |
|---|---|---|---|
| Romania | 2014 | 2 | 0 |
| Total | | 2 | 0 |

== Honours ==
Steaua București

- Cupa României: 2010–11

Dinamo București

- Cupa României: 2011–12
- Supercupa României: 2012

Sepsi OSK

- Cupa României: 2022–23
- Supercupa României: 2022, 2023

Individual

- Liga I Player of the Month: April 2014
