= Diogo Valente =

Portuguese footballer (born 1984)

Personal information
- Full name: Diogo Jorge Moreno Valente
- Date of birth: 23 September 1984 (age 42)
- Place of birth: Aveiro, Portugal
- Height: 1.76 m (5 ft 9 in)
- Position: Winger

Youth career
- 1994–2000: Beira-Mar
- 2000–2001: Boavista
- 2001–2002: Feirense
- 2002–2003: Boavista

Senior career*
Years	Team	Apps	(Gls)
2003–2006	Boavista	45	(6)
2003–2004	→ Chaves (loan)	27	(1)
2006–2009	Porto	1	(0)
2007	→ Marítimo (loan)	5	(1)
2007–2009	→ Leixões (loan)	46	(5)
2009–2011	Braga	8	(0)
2010–2011	→ Académica (loan)	29	(2)
2011–2012	Académica	28	(2)
2012–2015	CFR Cluj	19	(1)
2013–2014	→ Académica (loan)	21	(1)
2014−2015	→ Gil Vicente (loan)	10	(1)
2015–2016	Şanlıurfaspor	12	(2)
2016–2017	Freamunde	16	(2)
2017–2019	Oliveirense	46	(8)
2019–2021	Espinho	46	(13)
2021–2026	Salgueiros	123	(23)
Total		482	(68)

International career
2005–2007	Portugal U21	12	(0)
2005–2009	Portugal B	3	(0)
- * Club domestic league appearances and goals

Diogo Jorge Moreno Valente (born 23 September 1984) is a Portuguese former professional footballer who played as a left winger.

He totalled 193 Primeira Liga games and 18 goals for seven clubs, including as a fringe player for Porto and Braga. Having started his professional career at Boavista, he also played three top-flight campaigns for Académica, where he won the Taça de Portugal in 2012.

== Club career ==
=== Boavista ===
Valente was born in Aveiro. A product of Boavista FC's youth system, he made his professional debut for the northerners in the 2004–05 season and quickly established himself as first-choice as the team achieved two consecutive sixth places in the Primeira Liga.

Previously, Valente served a one-year loan at G.D. Chaves in the Segunda Liga.

=== Porto ===
In July 2006, Valente signed for an undisclosed fee with FC Porto but, in January 2007, after appearing just once (albeit in an important match, a 1–1 away draw against Sporting CP), he was loaned to C.S. Marítimo, where he scored at C.D. Aves (another away fixture, same score).

Valente was loaned again from 2007 to 2009, this time at Leixões S.C. which had returned to the top division for 2007–08. Alongside teammates Paulo Machado and Vieirinha, also loaned by Porto, he proved instrumental as the Matosinhos club not only retained its league status but finished in a best-ever sixth position the following campaign.

=== Braga and Académica ===
On 1 July 2009, Valente left Porto by mutual agreement, joining S.C. Braga for an undisclosed fee. As the Minho side finished in a best-ever second place, he appeared rarely, sometimes not even making the squad of 18.

Valente featured regularly for Académica de Coimbra during 2010–11, on loan. On 29 June 2011, he terminated his contract with Braga and signed a one-year deal with the Students; in the first year in his second spell he again rarely missed a game, and scored once in seven appearances in the season's Taça de Portugal, which ended in conquest after 73 years.

=== Later years ===
In late May 2012, Valente joined Romanian club CFR Cluj on a three-year contract, where he shared teams with a host of compatriots. He scored three competitive goals during his stint at the Stadionul Dr. Constantin Rădulescu, including one in the defeat to FC Dinamo București in the Supercupa României (on penalties, following a 2–2 draw in regulation time).

On 20 August 2015, after an unassuming top-flight spell at Gil Vicente FC (less than one third of the games, relegation), 30-year-old Valente moved abroad again and signed a one-year deal with Şanlıurfaspor in the Turkish TFF First League. He returned to his country and its division two at the end of the campaign, representing in quick succession S.C. Freamunde and U.D. Oliveirense.

Valente dropped into the third tier for the first time in his career in July 2019, with S.C. Espinho. Two years later, he continued at that level with S.C. Salgueiros.

== International career ==
Valente earned his first cap for the Portugal under-21 team on 29 March 2005, featuring 89 minutes in a 1–0 away win over Slovakia for the 2006 UEFA European Championship qualifiers.

== Career statistics ==
As of 22 February 2015

Appearances and goals by club, season and competition
Club	Season	League			Cup		Other		Total	
Club	Season	Division	Apps	Goals	Apps	Goals	Apps	Goals	Apps	Goals
Boavista	2004–05	Primeira Liga	23	4	3	2	—		26	6
Boavista	2005–06	Primeira Liga	22	2	0	0	—		22	2
Boavista	Total		45	6	3	2	—		48	8
Chaves (loan)	2003–04	Segunda Liga	27	1	1	0	—		28	1
Porto	2006–07	Primeira Liga	1	0	0	0	0	0	1	0
Marítimo (loan)	2006–07	Primeira Liga	5	1	1	0	—		6	1
Leixões (loan)	2007–08	Primeira Liga	17	1	3	1	—		20	2
Leixões (loan)	2008–09	Primeira Liga	29	4	6	1	—		35	5
Leixões (loan)	Total		46	5	9	2	—		55	7
Braga	2009–10	Primeira Liga	8	0	3	0	2 (Note: Appearances in UEFA Europa League)	0	13	0
Académica (loan)	2010–11	Primeira Liga	29	2	6	1	—		35	3
Académica	2011–12	Primeira Liga	28	2	8	1	—		36	3
CFR Cluj	2012–13	Liga I	19	1	5	2	4 (Note: Appearances in UEFA Champions League and UEFA Europa League)	0	28	3
Académica (loan)	2013–14	Primeira Liga	21	1	6	1	—		27	2
Gil Vicente (loan)	2014–15	Primeira Liga	10	1	4	0	—		14	1
Career total			239	19	43	9	6	0	288	28

== Honours ==
Porto

- Primeira Liga: 2006–07

Académica

- Taça de Portugal: 2011–12
