= Nicolae Mușat =

Romanian footballer

Personal information
- Full name: Nicolae Constantin Mușat
- Date of birth: 4 December 1986 (age 39)
- Place of birth: Bucharest, Romania
- Height: 1.77 m (5 ft 9 1/2 in)
- Position: Left back

Youth career
- 1994–2005: Dinamo București

Senior career*
Years	Team	Apps	(Gls)
2005–2013	Dinamo II București	108	(9)
2005–2013	Dinamo București	28	(1)
2008	→ Otopeni (loan)	7	(0)
2009	→ Astra Ploiești (loan)	1	(0)
2009–2010	→ Universitatea Cluj (loan)	24	(0)
2010	→ Unirea Urziceni (loan)	12	(0)
2011	→ Khazar Lankaran (loan)	6	(0)
2013–2014	Vaslui	20	(1)
2014	Universitatea Cluj	15	(2)
2015	Concordia Chiajna	7	(0)
2015	Academica Clinceni	12	(2)
2016–2018	Botoșani	73	(2)
2018–2019	Daco-Getica București	23	(2)
2019–2022	Argeș Pitești	85	(0)
Total		421	(19)
- * Club domestic league appearances and goals as of 9 January 2023

Nicolae Constantin Mușat (born 4 December 1986 in Bucharest) is a Romanian former footballer who played as a defender. He spent most of his career playing in Romania, having a total of 225 Liga I appearances with 6 goals scored and 164 Liga II appearances with 10 goals scored, in his only experience abroad he played 6 games in the Azerbaijan Premier League for Khazar Lankaran.

== Honours ==
Dinamo București

- Liga I: 2006–07
- Cupa României: 2011–12
- Supercupa României: 2012

Dinamo II București

- Liga III: 2006–07

Khazar Lankaran

- Azerbaijan Cup: 2010–11
