= Alexandru Curtean =

Romanian footballer

Personal information
- Full name: Alexandru Paul Curtean
- Date of birth: 27 March 1987 (age 39)
- Place of birth: Sibiu, Romania
- Height: 1.82 m (6 ft 0 in)
- Position: Winger

Team information
- Current team: 1599 Șelimbăr (head of youth development)

Youth career
- –2003: Inter Sibiu
- 2003–2004: FC Sibiu

Senior career*
Years	Team	Apps	(Gls)
2003–2004	FC Sibiu		
2004–2008	Gaz Metan Mediaș	77	(16)
2009–2011	Politehnica Timișoara	59	(5)
2012–2013	Dinamo București	62	(8)
2014	Botev Plovdiv	12	(3)
2014–2015	Gaz Metan Mediaș	19	(2)
2015–2016	ACS Poli Timișoara	16	(1)
2016	Atyrau	29	(4)
2017–2018	Gaz Metan Mediaș	24	(2)
2018–2019	Hermannstadt	15	(2)
2019–2022	1599 Șelimbăr	51	(12)
2023	Corvinul Hunedoara	11	(0)
Total		375	(55)

International career
2008	Romania U21	2	(0)

Managerial career
- 2023–2025: ACS Mediaș (sporting director)
- 2024–2025: ACS Mediaș
- 2026–: 1599 Șelimbăr (head of youth development)
- * Club domestic league appearances and goals

Alexandru Paul Curtean (born 27 March 1987) is a Romanian former professional footballer who played as a winger, currently head of youth development at Liga II club 1599 Șelimbăr.

== Personal life ==
Born in Sibiu, Curtean was born into a sporting family. His father, Dan Curtean, was also a football player in the early 1980s and played for Șoimii Sibiu, Steaua București, Olt Scornicești and Luceafărul București. His mother, Carmen, was a professional handball player, and his sister, Daciana, was also a professional handball player.

== Club career ==
=== Early career ===
Curtean started his career at FC Sibiu, but he transferred to Gaz Metan Mediașwhen was still young being recruited by coach Ioan Ovidiu Sabău.

=== Gaz Metan Mediaș ===
The younger player was imposed and became important piece in first eleven, helping his team advance in Liga I. In first season in Liga 1, he made a fantastic matches, scores 7 goals in 14 appearances and major league teams putting an eye on him.

=== Politehnica Timișoara ===
Politehnica Timișoara paid for him €1,300,000 to CS Gaz Metan Mediaș. He signed with FC Politehnica Timișoara on 27 January 2009 for 5 years. In first year has not been settled and fans criticized him for being too careless. But at started the 2010–2011 season, was appointed Vladimir Petrović as the new coach who reinvented him and scores two goals against league champions CFR Cluj.

=== Dinamo București ===
In January 2012, Curtean was transferred to Dinamo București. He signed a contract for four and a half years, until June 2016. He scored his first goal for Dinamo in a game against U Cluj, on 2 May 2012. 15 days later, on 17 May 2012, Curtean scored a goal in the eternal derby against Steaua, at his first appearance in this derby.

=== Botev Plovdiv ===
Curtean arrived in Botev Plovdiv on 11 January 2014, signing a contract for 2 1/2 years with the club. But the contract was terminated after only six months due to the financial problems plaguing the club.

=== Gaz Metan Mediaș ===
In September 2014, Curtean reached an agreement with his former club Gaz Metan Mediaș.

=== ACS Poli Timișoara ===
After Gaz Metan's relegation, in 2015, Curtean became a free agent and signed a contract with Poli Timișoara.

== Honours ==
Politehnica Timișoara

- Liga II: 2011–12
- Cupa României runner-up: 2008–09

Dinamo București

- Cupa României: 2011–12
- Supercupa României: 2012

Botev Plovdiv

- Bulgarian Cup runner-up: 2013–14
- Bulgarian Supercup runner-up: 2014

Hermannstadt

- Cupa României runner-up: 2017–18

Viitorul Șelimbăr

- Liga III: 2020–21

Corvinul Hunedoara

- Liga III: 2022–23
