= Laurențiu Rus =

Romanian footballer

Personal information
- Full name: Laurențiu Daniel Rus
- Date of birth: 7 May 1985 (age 41)
- Place of birth: Cluj-Napoca, Romania
- Height: 1.77 m (5 ft 10 in)
- Positions: Right back; midfielder

Youth career
- 1995–2004: Universitatea Cluj

Senior career*
Years	Team	Apps	(Gls)
2004–2009	Liberty Salonta	94	(1)
2006–2007	→ Sopron (loan)	12	(1)
2008	→ Petrolul Ploiești (loan)	16	(1)
2009–2014	Dinamo București	113	(4)
2011	→ FCM Târgu Mureş (loan)	16	(1)
2014–2015	Astra Giurgiu	15	(0)
2015–2016	Voluntari	31	(3)
2016–2018	CFR Cluj	35	(0)
2018–2019	Politehnica Iași	21	(0)
2019	Sănătatea Cluj		
2020	CSM Reșița	2	(0)
2020–2021	Universitatea Cluj	8	(0)
Total		363	(11)

Managerial career
- 2022: Universitatea Cluj U19 (fitness coach)
- 2022–2023: Argeș Pitești (fitness coach)
- 2024–2026: CFR Cluj (assistant)
- 2026: CFR Cluj (caretaker)
- * Club domestic league appearances and goals

Laurențiu Daniel Rus (born 7 May 1985) is a former Romanian professional footballer.

== Playing career ==
In 2004 Rus moved to Divizia B club Liberty Oradea. For the 2006–07 season, Rus was loaned to Hungarian first league club Sopron and for the second part of the 2007–08 season he was loaned to Petrolul Ploiești.

=== Dinamo București ===
In the summer of 2009, after impressing in the Romanian second league with Liberty Oradea, Rus moved to Liga I club Dinamo București. After putting in some solid displays, he immediately established himself in the starting eleven for the 2011–12 season. For the 2013–14 Liga I campaign, Rus became captain of Dinamo București. In July 2014, after not coming to an agreement over his wages with Dinamo, he terminated his contract by mutual consent with the Bucharest club.

=== CFR Cluj ===
On 20 August 2016, after ending his stay at Voluntari, Rus moved to Romanian giants CFR Cluj and subsequently signed a two-year deal with them. In his second year with CFR Cluj, Rus managed to win the Liga I for the first time in his career.

=== Politehnica Iași ===
On 7 July 2018, Rus moved to fellow Liga I side Politehnica Iași, after agreeing to a one-year contract.

=== CSM Reşiţa ===
On 9 January 2020, Rus joined Liga II side CSM Reşiţa.

== Playing statistics ==
Appearances and goals by club, season and competition
Club	Season	League			Cupa României		Europe		Other		Total	
Club	Season	Division	Apps	Goals	Apps	Goals	Apps	Goals	Apps	Goals	Apps	Goals
Liberty Salonta	2004–05	Liga II	20	0	0	0	—		—		20	0
Liberty Salonta	2005–06	Liga II	27	0	0	0	—		—		27	0
Liberty Salonta	2007–08	Liga II	15	0	0	0	—		—		15	0
Liberty Salonta	2008–09	Liga II	32	1	0	0	—		—		32	1
Liberty Salonta	Total		94	1	0	0	0	0	0	0	94	1
Sopron (loan)	2006–07	Nemzeti Bajnokság I	12	1	0	0	—		—		12	1
Petrolul Ploiești (loan)	2007–08	Liga II	16	1	0	0	—		—		16	1
Dinamo București	2009–10	Liga I	20	0	3	0	5 (Note: Appearances in UEFA Europa League)	0	—		28	0
Dinamo București	2010–11	Liga I	1	0	1	0	—		—		2	0
Dinamo București	2011–12	Liga I	31	1	5	1	3	0	—		39	2
Dinamo București	2012–13	Liga I	31	1	2	1	—		1 (Note: Appearance in Supercupa României)	0	34	1
Dinamo București	2013–14	Liga I	30	2	4	0	—		—		34	1
Dinamo București	Total		113	4	15	2	8	0	1	0	137	6
FCM Târgu Mureş (loan)	2010–11	Liga I	16	1	—		—		—		16	1
Astra Giurgiu	2014–15	Liga I	15	0	1	0	7	1	2 (Note: Appearance in Cupa Ligii)	0	25	1
Voluntari	2015–16	Liga I	31	3	1	0	—		3	0	35	3
CFR Cluj	2016–17	Liga I	25	0	2	0	—		1	0	28	0
CFR Cluj	2017–18	Liga I	10	0	1	0	—		—		11	0
CFR Cluj	Total		35	0	3	0	0	0	1	0	39	0
Politehnica Iași	2018–19	Liga I	21	0	2	0	—		—		23	0
Sănătatea Cluj	2019–20	Liga III	?	?	2	1	—		—		2	1
CSM Reșița	2019–20	Liga II	2	0	—		—		—		2	0
Universitatea Cluj	2020–21	Liga II	7	0	0	0	—		—		7	0
Universitatea Cluj	2021–22	Liga II	1	0	0	0	—		—		1	0
Career total			363	11	24	3	15	1	7	0	409	15

== Honours ==
Liberty Salonta

- Divizia B: 2005–06

Dinamo București

- Cupa României: 2011–12
- Supercupa României: 2012

CFR Cluj

- Liga I: 2017–18
