= 2012 Supercupa României =

- Event: 2012 Supercupa României
CFR Cluj	Dinamo București
Liga I	Cupa României
2	2
- Dinamo won 4–2 on penalties
- Date: 14 July 2012
- Venue: Arena Națională, București
- Man of the Match: Țucudean
- Referee: Ovidiu Hațegan (Romania)
- Attendance: 9,960
- Weather: Clear night 33 °C (91 °F)

The 2012 Supercupa României was the 14th edition of Romania's season opener cup competition. The game was contested between Liga I title holders, CFR Cluj, and Romanian Cup winners, Dinamo București. For the first time in history, the Supercup was played at Arena Națională, the newly stadium built in Bucharest.

Dinamo won the game after penalties. After regular time the game ended 1–1 after goals of Diogo Valente, who opened the score for Cluj, and George Țucudean, who equalised in the second half. CFR had their captain Cadú sent off in the 65th minute. In extra time, Țucudean scored again, but CFR answered only one minute later with a goal by Pantelis Kapetanos. At the penalty shootout, two players from CFR missed, only one player from Dinamo failed to score, thus the white-and-reds won the trophy for the second time in history.

== Match ==
=== Details ===
14 July 2012
21:00 EEST

CFR Cluj	2–2 (a.e.t.)	Dinamo București
D. Valente 36'; Kapetanos 102'	Report	Țucudean 62', 101'
Penalties
Kapetanos (penalty scored); Sougou (penalty missed); Hora (penalty missed); Mureșan (penalty scored)	2 – 4	(penalty scored) Alexe; (penalty scored) Matei; (penalty scored) Munteanu; (penalty missed) Țucudean; (penalty scored) Grigore

Arena Națională, București
Attendance: 9,960
Referee: Ovidiu Hațegan (Romania)

CFR Cluj	Dinamo București

CFR CLUJ:
GK	44	(Romania) Eduard Stăncioiu
RB	3	(Portugal) Ivo Pinto
CB	20	(Portugal) Cadú (c)	(yellow card) 50' (yellow-red card) 65'
CB	12	(Romania) Vasile Maftei
LB	45	(Portugal) Camora	(yellow card) 77'
RM	7	(Romania) Ciprian Deac	(yellow card) 12'
CM	6	(Romania) Gabriel Mureșan
CM	18	(Hungary) Ádám Vass		(substituted off) 59'
LM	10	(Portugal) Diogo Valente		(substituted off) 70'
FW	99	(Senegal) Modou Sougou	(yellow card) 30'
FW	27	(Brazil) Ronny		(substituted off) 78'
Substitutes:
GK	32	(Romania) Mihai Mincă
CM	5	(Ivory Coast) Bakary Saré		(substituted on) 59'
LB	8	(Romania) László Sepsi
FW	9	(Greece) Pantelis Kapetanos		(substituted on) 78'
MF	11	(Romania) Viorel Nicoară
MF	22	(Romania) Ioan Hora		(substituted on) 70'
CB	24	(Romania) Ionuț Rada
Manager:
(Romania) Ioan Andone

DINAMO:
GK	34	(Romania) Cristian Bălgrădean
RB	2	(Romania) Constantin Nica
CB	24	(Romania) Srdjan Luchin
CB	21	(Romania) Dragoș Grigore	(yellow card) 107'
LB	3	(Romania) Cristian Pulhac
RW	26	(Romania) Laurențiu Rus		(substituted off) 61'
CM	18	(Senegal) Issa Ba		(substituted off) 82'
CM	19	(Senegal) Boubacar Mansaly	(yellow card) 95'
LW	10	(Romania) Marius Alexe
AM	7	(Romania) Cătălin Munteanu	(yellow card) 110'
FW	9	(Romania) Marius Niculae (c)		(substituted off) 46'
Substitutes:
GK	23	(North Macedonia) Kristijan Naumovski
DF	14	(Romania) Alin Dobrosavlevici
CM	4	(Romania) Cosmin Matei		(substituted on) 61'
CM	20	(Romania) Alexandru Curtean		(substituted on) 82'
FW	25	(Romania) Ionel Dănciulescu
FW	29	(Romania) George Țucudean		(substituted on) 46'
LB	32	(Romania) Nicolae Mușat
Manager:
(Italy) Dario Bonetti

MAN OF THE MATCH

- (Romania) George Țucudean (Dinamo)

MATCH OFFICIALS

- Assistant referees:
  - Cristian Nica
  - Aurel Onița
- Fourth official:
  - Adrian Cojocaru
- Additional assistant referees:
  - Sebastian Colțescu
  - Robert Dumitru

MATCH RULES

- 90 minutes.
- 30 minutes of extra-time if necessary.
- Penalty shoot-out if scores still level.
- Seven named substitutes.
- Maximum of three substitutions.

== See also ==
- 2012–13 Liga I
- 2012–13 Cupa României
