= Kristijan Naumovski =

Macedonian footballer

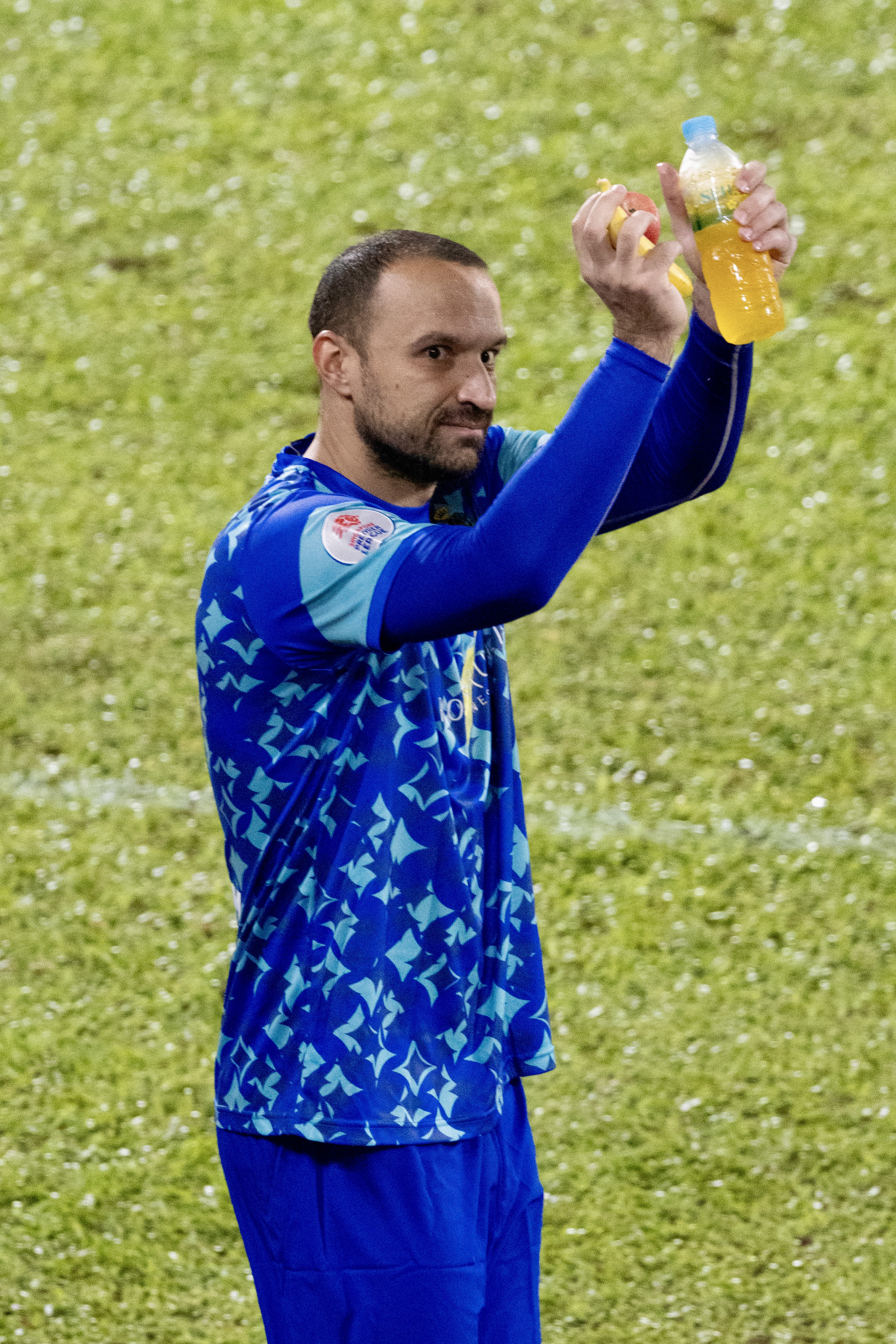
- Naumovski with DPMM in 2025

Personal information
- Full name: Kristijan Naumovski; Кристијан Наумовски
- Date of birth: 17 September 1988 (age 38)
- Place of birth: Skopje, SFR Yugoslavia
- Height: 1.88 m (6 ft 2 in)
- Position: Goalkeeper

Team information
- Current team: FK Skopje

Senior career*
Years	Team	Apps	(Gls)
2008–2010	Rabotnički	31	(0)
2010–2014	Dinamo București	28	(0)
2014	Levski Sofia	3	(0)
2015	Dinamo București	8	(0)
2015–2017	HK Pegasus	31	(0)
2017–2019	Birkirkara	33	(0)
2019–2020	Balzan	16	(1)
2020–2023	Shkupi	83	(0)
2023–2025	DPMM	37	(0)
2026–	Skopje	0	(0)

International career^{‡}
2007–2010	Macedonia U-21	13	(0)
2009–2023	North Macedonia	7	(0)
- * Club domestic league appearances and goals as of 17 January 2026 ‡ National team caps and goals as of 26 March 2022

Kristijan Naumovski (Macedonian: Кристијан Наумовски; born 17 September 1988) is a Macedonian international footballer who plays as a goalkeeper for FK Skopje.

== Club career ==
Naumovski signed a two-year contract with Levski Sofia in the summer of 2014.

On 11 June 2017, HK Pegasus chairperson Canny Leung revealed that Naumovski would be leaving the club as his contract would not be renewed.

In June 2023, he signed for Brunei DPMM FC of the Singapore Premier League. He extended his stay for another season in 2024, and added an extension to the deal in 2025 when the club moved to the Malaysia Super League. In his first game in the new league, he saved a penalty from Ahmad Israiwah in a 2–2 draw against PDRM FC. He managed five league and cup appearances before leaving Brunei at the end of 2025.

== International career ==
He made his senior debut for Macedonia in a November 2009 friendly match against Canada and has earned a total of 6 caps, scoring no goals. His final international was a March 2015 friendly against Australia. The coach of North Macedonia, Blagoja Milevski has called him up for the 2022 Qatar World Cup qualification playoff after 7 years absence.

== Career statistics ==
=== Club ===
As of 15 September 2025

Club	Season	Division	League		Cup		Continental		Total	
Club	Season	Division	Apps	Goals	Apps	Goals	Apps	Goals	Apps	Goals
Rabotnički Skopje	2008–09	First League	11	0	0	0	0	0	11	0
Rabotnički Skopje	2009–10	First League	20	0	0	0	3	0	23	0
Rabotnički Skopje	2010–11	First League	0	0	0	0	1	0	1	0
Rabotnički Skopje	Total		31	0	0	0	4	0	35	0
Dinamo București	2010–11	Liga I	7	0	0	0	–		7	0
Dinamo București	2011–12	Liga I	4	0	3	0	0	0	7	0
Dinamo București	2012–13	Liga I	10	0	0	0	0	0	10	0
Dinamo București	2013–14	Liga I	7	0	1	0	–		8	0
Dinamo București	Total		28	0	4	0	0	0	32	0
Levski Sofia	2014–15	A Group	3	0	2	0	–		5	0
Levski Sofia	Total		3	0	2	0	0	0	5	0
Dinamo București	2014–15	Liga I	8	0	0	0	–		8	0
Dinamo București	Total		8	0	0	0	0	0	8	0
Pegasus FC	2015–16	Hong Kong Premier League	12	0	9	0	–		20	0
Pegasus FC	2016–17	Hong Kong Premier League	19	0	4	0	-		23	0
Pegasus FC	Total		31	0	13	0	0	0	43	0
Birkirkara FC	2017–18	Maltese Premier League	12	0	3	0	–		15	0
Birkirkara FC	2018–19	Maltese Premier League	21	0	2	0	2	0	25	0
Birkirkara FC	Total		33	0	5	0	2	0	40	0
Balzan FC	2019–20	Maltese Premier League	16	1	3	0	2	0	21	1
Balzan FC	Total		16	1	3	0	2	0	21	1
KF Shkupi	2020–21	First League	27	0	3	0	1	0	31	0
KF Shkupi	2021–22	First League	30	0	3	0	4	0	37	0
KF Shkupi	2022–23	First League	26	0	3	0	8	0	37	0
KF Shkupi	Total		83	0	9	0	13	0	105	0
DPMM FC	2023	Singapore Premier League	10	0	7	0	1	0	18	0
DPMM FC	2024–25	Singapore Premier League	24	0	4	0	0	0	28	0
DPMM FC	2025–26	Malaysia Super League	3	0	2	0	0	0	5	0
DPMM FC	Total		37	0	13	0	1	0	51	0
	Career Total		269	1	49	0	22	0	340	1

=== National team ===
Macedonia national team
Year	Apps	Goals
2009	1	0
2012	1	0
2013	1	0
2014	2	0
Total	5	0

== Honours ==
Rabotnički Skopje

- Macedonian Football Cup: 2008–09

Dinamo București

- Cupa României: 2011–12
- Supercupa României: 2012

Hong Kong Pegasus

- Hong Kong FA Cup: 2015–16
- Hong Kong Sapling Cup: 2015–16

Shkupi

- Macedonian First Football League: 2021–22
