= Dario Bonetti =

Italian footballer (born 1961)

Personal information
- Date of birth: 5 August 1961 (age 65)
- Place of birth: San Zeno Naviglio, Italy
- Height: 1.87 m (6 ft 2 in)
- Position: Centre-back

Youth career
- 1974–1978: Brescia

Senior career*
Years	Team	Apps	(Gls)
1978–1980	Brescia	29	(2)
1980–1986	Roma	104	(3)
1982–1983	→ Sampdoria (loan)	27	(0)
1986–1987	AC Milan	23	(0)
1987–1989	Hellas Verona	40	(1)
1989–1991	Juventus	39	(3)
1991–1992	Sampdoria	14	(0)
1992–1993	SPAL	9	(0)
Total		285	(9)

International career
1981–1986	Italy U18	3	(0)
1981–1986	Italy U21	14	(0)
1986	Italy	2	(0)

Managerial career
- 1999–2000: Sestrese
- 2000–2002: Dundee (assistant)
- 2005: Potenza
- 2005–2006: Sopron
- 2007: Sopron
- 2007–2008: Gallipoli
- 2008–2009: Juve Stabia
- 2009: Dinamo București
- 2009–2010: Pescina Valle del Giovenco
- 2010–2011: Zambia
- 2012: Dinamo București
- 2016: ASA Târgu Mureș
- 2021: Dinamo București
Medal record
Men's Football
Representing Italy
UEFA European Under-21 Championship
Third place	1984 UEFA
- * Club domestic league appearances and goals

Dario Bonetti (Italian pronunciation: [ˈdaːrjo boˈnɛtti]; born 5 August 1961) is an Italian football manager and former player.

== Club career ==
Born in San Zeno Naviglio, Brescia, Italy, Bonetti made his professional debut during the 1978–79 season with Brescia. He then moved to Roma in 1980, and played for the giallorossi until 1986, except for a one-season spell at Sampdoria during the 1982–83 season; during his time with Roma, he won three Coppa Italia titles. In 1986, he signed for Milan, but failed to impress and moved to Verona only one year later. In 1989, he transferred to Juventus, where he played two seasons, making 63 appearances and scoring 5 goals, winning a Coppa Italia and UEFA Cup double under manager Dino Zoff in 1990. A return to Sampdoria in 1991 was followed by a single season at SPAL in 1992, and retirement in 1993.

In his whole playing career in the Serie A, Dario Bonetti was suspended for a total of 39 matches, this being as of 2009 an absolute record.

== International career ==
Bonetti made two appearances for the Italy national team in 1986, making his debut on 8 October, in a 2–0 win over Greece.

== Style of play ==
A strong and tenacious centre-back, Bonetti was primarily known for his stamina, determination, physical attributes, and his man-marking ability. He was also notorious for his aggression on the pitch, however, which led him to pick up many cards, as well as his lack of pace and technical ability; in later years, he also struggled to adapt into the new zonal marking system which was implemented by manager Luigi Maifredi upon his arrival at Juventus in 1990.

== Managerial career ==
After his retirement, Dario Bonetti became coach of amateur Genoa side Sestrese in 1999, with his brother Ivano as player. Both brothers then jointly managed Scottish team Dundee from 2000 to 2002, with Dario officially acting as Ivano's technical assistant. In February 2005, Dario Bonetti was then appointed head coach of Serie C2 club Potenza. He then announced a surprising move to Hungarian side MFC Sopron in February 2006, thus joining fellow Italian Giuseppe Signori. Bonetti was then sacked in May 2006, after the final matchday, a 1–0 home loss to Rákospalotai EAC, but made a comeback at the Hungarian side in March 2007. On 22 June 2007, he was unveiled as new head coach of Italian Serie C1 team Gallipoli.

In December 2008, he was appointed as the new head coach of the Lega Pro Prima Divisione team Juve Stabia.

On 23 June 2009, he was appointed as the new head coach of Liga I team Dinamo București, the Italian coach replacing Mircea Rednic. He was sacked by Nicolae Badea, head of the Administrative Council of Dinamo Bucharest, as a result of Bonetti's public statements about Dinamo shareholders on 3 October 2009.

On 9 November 2009, Bonetti was announced as the new head coach of Lega Pro Prima Divisione team Valle del Giovenco. He was fired in February 2010.

In July 2010, he was unveiled as the new manager of the Zambia national team. Despite successful 2012 Africa Cup of Nations qualifying campaign, he was sacked on 10 October 2011, two days after Zambia qualified for Africa Cup of Nations.

On 10 April 2012, Bonetti returned to Dinamo București. He won two trophies with Dinamo, the Romanian Cup and the Romanian Supercup, but started the 2012–13 season poorly, with the team being quickly eliminated from the UEFA Europa League and winning only six of the first 15 games in Liga I. Because of this, Bonetti was sacked on 14 November 2012.

In July 2021, he came back to Dinamo, starting his third stint. He was sacked after only two months in charge. In the seven matches played with Bonetti in the dugout, Dinamo won two and lost the last five, without scoring a goal. The last match for Bonetti was a defeat 0-6 against rivals FCSB.

== Personal life ==
He is the elder brother of Ivano Bonetti, who was also a footballer for several clubs in Italy in both Serie A and Serie B most notably Juventus, Sampdoria, Bologna and Brescia.

== Honours ==
=== Player ===
Roma

- Coppa Italia: 1980–81, 1983–84, 1985–86
- European Cup runner-up: 1983–84

Juventus

- Coppa Italia: 1989–90
- UEFA Cup: 1989–90
- Supercoppa Italiana runner-up: 1990

Sampdoria

- Supercoppa Italiana: 1991
- European Cup runner-up: 1991–92

=== Coach ===
Dinamo București

- Cupa României: 2011–12
- Supercupa României: 2012
