= 2010–11 FC Dinamo București season =

FC Dinamo București
2010–11 season
- Chairman: Nicolae Badea
- Manager: Ioan Andone
- Liga I: 6th
- Cupa României: Finalist
- UEFA Europa League: Third qualifying round
- Top goalscorer: League: Torje (9 goals); All: Torje (11 goals)
- Highest home attendance: 15,500 (17 October 2010 vs Steaua, Liga I)
- Lowest home attendance: 500 (4 December 2010 vs Astra, Liga I)
- Average home league attendance: 3,618

The 2010–11 season was FC Dinamo București's 62nd consecutive season in Liga I. Dinamo sought to win their first trophy in four seasons, but this once again proved unsuccessful. The team started well the season in Liga I, leading until the seventh day, but a run of five matches without win ended their challenge. The team came closest to silverware in the Romanian Cup, reaching the final, only to lose against its biggest rival, FC Steaua București.

== Season review ==
Dinamo started the season with a new manager, Ioan Andone, brought back in charge after five years. The first official game was in the UEFA Europa League, against Moldavian side FC Olimpia Bălţi. Dinamo won both legs with 7–1 on aggregate. In the third preliminary round, Dinamo was beaten 4–3 on aggregate by HNK Hajduk Split from Croatia.

In the championship, Dinamo started with four wins in the first five games. But in the next five, Dinamo managed only one point, a draw against FC Brașov and could not get back on track. The team won both games against its biggest rivals, Steaua, gained four points in the games against the other rivals from Bucharest, Rapid, but failed to win against smaller teams like Astra Ploieşti, Universitatea Cluj and Pandurii Târgu Jiu. The defence was the weakest link. Dinamo ended the season with 54 goals conceded, more than 1.5 per game. They finished the season sixth thereby qualifying for the next season of Europa League.

In the Romanian Cup, Dinamo reached the final for the first time in six years. Its opponents were Steaua, and after winning both games in the championship, Dinamo failed to win the final after an own-goal from Ştefan Bărboianu.

== Players ==
=== Squad changes ===
In:

| No. | Pos. | Nat. | Name | Age | EU | Moving from | Type | Transfer window | Ends | Transfer fee | Source |
|---|---|---|---|---|---|---|---|---|---|---|---|
| 16 | LB | (Brazil) | Hélder Maurílio | 22 | | Auxerre (France) | Loaned | Summer | 2011 | — | |
| | CB | (Romania) | Silviu Izvoranu | 27 | EU | Internațional Curtea de Argeș | Loan Return | Summer | | — | |
| 27 | CB | (Romania) | Sergiu Homei | 22 | EU | Gloria Bistriţa | Loan Return | Summer | | — | |
| | CB | (North Macedonia) | Blaže Todorovski | 25 | | Renova (North Macedonia) | Loan Return | Summer | | — | |
| | CM | (Romania) | Hristu Chiacu | 24 | EU | Politehnica Timișoara | Loan Return | Summer | | — | |
| 19 | FW | (Romania) | Liviu Ganea | 22 | EU | Astra Ploiești | Loan Return | Summer | | — | |
| 14 | FW | (Romania) | Georgian Păun | 24 | EU | Politehnica Iași | Loan Return | Summer | | — | |
| 9 | FW | (Argentina) | Osvaldo Miranda | 25 | | Belgrano (Argentina) | Loan Return | Summer | | — | |
| 7 | CM | (Romania) | Cătălin Munteanu | 31 | EU | Braşov | Transfer | Summer | 2011 | Free | |
| 34 | GK | (Romania) | Cristian Bălgrădean | 22 | EU | Arad | Transfer | Summer | 2014 | Undisclosed | |
| 30 | CB | (Argentina) | Juan Pablo Garat | 27 | | St. Gallen (Switzerland) | Transfer | Summer | 2011 | Free | |
| 28 | CB | (Bosnia and Herzegovina) | Ajdin Maksumić | 24 | | Sarajevo (Bosnia and Herzegovina) | Transfer | Summer | 2015 | €600,000 | |
| 23 | GK | (North Macedonia) | Kristijan Naumovski | 21 | | Rabotnički (North Macedonia) | Transfer | Summer | 2015 | €100,000 | |
| 10 | FW | (Romania) | Ionel Dănciulescu | 33 | EU | Hércules (Spain) | Transfer | Summer | 2012 | Free | |
| 31 | DF | (Argentina) | Elias Bazzi | 29 | | Argeș Pitești | Transfer | Summer | 2011 | Undisclosed | |
| 16 | DF | (Romania) | Valeriu Bordeanu | 33 | EU | Unirea Urziceni | Transfer | Summer | 2012 | Free | |
| 3 | DF | (Spain) | Óscar Rubio | 26 | EU | Elche (Spain) | Transfer | Summer | 2011 | Free | |
| 17 | DF | (Romania) | Eugen Crăciun | 24 | EU | Astra Ploiești | Transfer | Winter | | Undisclosed | |
| 30 | MF | (Romania) | Vlad Munteanu | 30 | EU | Wolfsburg (Germany) | Transfer | Winter | 2011 | Free | |
| 8 | MF | (Romania) | Bogdan Pătraşcu | 31 | EU | Sportul Studențesc București | Transfer | Winter | 2012 | Free | |
| 20 | MF | (Albania) | Elis Bakaj | 23 | | Dinamo Tirana (Albania) | Transfer | Winter | 2016 | €200,000 | |
| 29 | DF | (Serbia) | Ersin Mehmedović | 29 | | Unirea Urziceni | Transfer | Winter | 2011 | Free | |
| 18 | DF | (Romania) | Ştefan Bărboianu | 23 | EU | Universitatea Craiova | Transfer | Winter | 2011 | Free | |
| 24 | DF | (Romania) | Valerică Găman | 22 | EU | Universitatea Craiova | Transfer | Winter | 2011 | Free | |

Out:

| No. | Pos. | Nat. | Name | Age | EU | Moving to | Type | Transfer window | Transfer fee | Source |
|---|---|---|---|---|---|---|---|---|---|---|
| 15 | FW | (Romania) | Florin Bratu | 30 | EU | Litex Lovech (Bulgaria) | Loaned Out | Summer | Undisclosed | |
| 19 | CB | (Romania) | Cristian Daminuţă | 20 | EU | Milan (Italy) | End of Loan | Summer | Undisclosed | |
| 14 | RB | (Spain) | Francisco Molinero | 24 | EU | Huesca (Spain) | Mutual agreement | Summer | | |
| 30 | CB | (Czech Republic) | Martin Živný | 29 | EU | Free agent | End of Contract | Summer | | |
| 8 | CM | (Romania) | Gabriel Boştină | 33 | EU | Universitatea Cluj | End of Contract | Summer | | |
| 13 | CB | (Romania) | Silviu Izvoranu | 27 | EU | Universitatea Cluj | Transfer | Summer | Undisclosed | |
| 1 | GK | (Romania) | Bogdan Lobonţ | 32 | EU | Roma (Italy) | Transfer | Summer | €800,000 | |
| 99 | FW | (Romania) | Claudiu Niculescu | 34 | EU | Universitatea Cluj | Transfer | Summer | Undisclosed | |
| 7 | FW | (Romania) | Ianis Zicu | 26 | EU | Politehnica Timișoara | Transfer | Summer | €500,000 | |
| 3 | DF | (Romania) | Cristian Pulhac | 25 | EU | Hércules (Spain) | Loaned Out | Summer | €250,000 | |
| 18 | DF | (Romania) | Lucian Goian | 27 | EU | Astra Ploiești | Loaned Out | Summer | | |
| 16 | LB | (Brazil) | Hélder Maurílio | 22 | | Politehnica Timișoara | Loaned Out | Summer | — | |
| 24 | MF | (Serbia) | Vojislav Vranjković | 27 | | Pandurii Târgu Jiu | Transfer | Summer | Undisclosed | |
| 28 | CB | (Bosnia and Herzegovina) | Ajdin Maksumić | 25 | | Pandurii Târgu Jiu | Transfer | Summer | €500,000 | |
| 30 | CB | (Argentina) | Juan Pablo Garat | 27 | | Free agent | Transfer | Winter | Free | |
| 31 | LB | (Argentina) | Elias Bazzi | 29 | | Universitatea Cluj | Transfer | Winter | Undisclosed | |
| 29 | MF | (Senegal) | Ousmane N'Doye | 32 | | Astra Ploiești | Transfer | Winter | €350,000 | |
| 20 | MF | (Romania) | Adrian Cristea | 27 | EU | Universitatea Cluj | Transfer | Winter | 1.5 million € | |
| 6 | MF | (Romania) | Laurenţiu Rus | 25 | EU | Târgu Mureș | Loaned Out | Winter | Undisclosed | |
| 25 | DF | (Romania) | Adrian Scarlatache | 24 | EU | Khazar Lankaran (Azerbaijan) | Loaned Out | Winter | Undisclosed | |
| 17 | FW | (Romania) | Andrei Cristea | 26 | EU | Karlsruher SC (Germany) | Transfer | Winter | Undisclosed | |
| 9 | FW | (Romania) | Marius Niculae | 29 | EU | Kavala (Greece) | Loaned out | Winter | €50,000 | |
| 1 | GK | (Romania) | George Curcă | 29 | EU | Unirea Urziceni | Loaned Out | Winter | Undisclosed | |
| 27 | DF | (Romania) | Sergiu Homei | 23 | EU | Unirea Urziceni | Loaned Out | Winter | Undisclosed | |

Last updated: 23 February 2011

=== Player statistics ===
==== Squad stats ====
| | | | | Total | | | | Liga I | | Cupa României | | UEFA Europa League | | |
| N | Pos. | Name | Nat. | GS | App | Gls | Min | App | Gls | App | Gls | App | Gls | Notes |
|---|---|---|---|---|---|---|---|---|---|---|---|---|---|---|
| 12 | GK | Dolha | (Romania) | 17 | 17 | -20 | 1556 | 14 | -18 | 3 | -2 | | | (−) means goals conceded |
| 23 | GK | Naumovski | (North Macedonia) | 6 | 7 | -16 | 544 | 7 | -16 | | | | | (−) means goals conceded |
| 34 | GK | Bălgrădean | (Romania) | 13 | 13 | -14 | 1155 | 10 | -11 | 3 | -3 | | | (−) means goals conceded |
| 2 | DF | Diabaté | (Ivory Coast) | 18 | 18 | | 1558 | 16 | | 2 | | | | |
| 3 | DF | Óscar Rubio | (Spain) | 21 | 20 | 1 | 1695 | 18 | 1 | 2 | | | | |
| 4 | DF | Moţi | (Romania) | 35 | 35 | 1 | 3026 | 28 | | 4 | 1 | 3 | | |
| 5 | MF | Koné | (Ivory Coast) | 28 | 33 | 4 | 2424 | 26 | 3 | 4 | | 3 | 1 | |
| 6 | MF | Mărgăritescu | (Romania) | 19 | 23 | | 1540 | 17 | | 4 | | 2 | | |
| 7 | MF | C.Munteanu | (Romania) | 25 | 38 | 7 | 2495 | 30 | 5 | 4 | 1 | 4 | 1 | |
| 8 | MF | Pătraşcu | (Romania) | 6 | 12 | | 596 | 10 | | 2 | | | | |
| 9 | FW | Ţucudean | (Romania) | 4 | 13 | 4 | 537 | 10 | 2 | 3 | 2 | | | |
| 10 | FW | Alexe | (Romania) | 27 | 30 | 8 | 2375 | 25 | 5 | 5 | 3 | | | |
| 14 | FW | Păun | (Romania) | 3 | 8 | | 331 | 4 | | 2 | | 2 | | |
| 16 | DF | Bordeanu | (Romania) | 18 | 22 | | 1708 | 17 | | 5 | | | | |
| 17 | DF | Crăciun | (Romania) | | 2 | | 67 | 1 | | 1 | | | | |
| 18 | DF | Bărboianu | (Romania) | 11 | 11 | | 990 | 9 | | 2 | | | | |
| 19 | FW | Ganea | (Romania) | 29 | 40 | 9 | 2470 | 31 | 8 | 5 | | 4 | 1 | |
| 20 | MF | Bakaj | (Albania) | 9 | 19 | 4 | 978 | 16 | 4 | 3 | | | | |
| 21 | DF | Grigore | (Romania) | 24 | 24 | 1 | 2180 | 20 | 1 | 4 | | | | |
| 22 | MF | Torje | (Romania) | 32 | 37 | 11 | 2877 | 29 | 9 | 4 | 1 | 4 | 1 | |
| 24 | DF | Găman | (Romania) | 8 | 8 | | 633 | 6 | | 2 | | | | |
| 25 | FW | Dănciulescu | (Romania) | 20 | 34 | 10 | 1799 | 29 | 7 | 5 | 3 | | | |
| 29 | DF | Mehmedović | (Serbia) | 1 | 5 | 1 | 197 | 4 | 1 | 1 | | | | |
| 30 | MF | V.Munteanu | (Romania) | 3 | 6 | 1 | 252 | 4 | | 2 | 1 | | | |
| 33 | MF | Stănescu | (Romania) | | 2 | | 13 | 2 | | | | | | |
Players sold or loaned out during the season
| 1 | GK | Curcă | (Romania) | 8 | 8 | -13 | 720 | 4 | -8 | | | 4 | -5 | (−) means goals conceded |
| 3 | DF | Pulhac | (Romania) | 6 | 6 | 1 | 540 | 2 | | | | 4 | 1 | |
| 6 | MF | Rus | (Romania) | 1 | 2 | | 124 | 1 | | 1 | | | | |
| 9 | FW | Niculae | (Romania) | 12 | 20 | 4 | 1157 | 16 | 3 | 2 | 1 | 2 | | |
| 16 | DF | Hélder | (Brazil) | 1 | 2 | | 100 | 2 | | | | | | |
| 17 | FW | An.Cristea | (Romania) | 12 | 18 | 7 | 1066 | 11 | 4 | 3 | 1 | 4 | 2 | |
| 18 | DF | Goian | (Romania) | 2 | 2 | | 180 | 2 | | | | | | |
| 20 | MF | Ad.Cristea | (Romania) | 20 | 22 | 8 | 1729 | 17 | 7 | 1 | | 4 | 1 | |
| 25 | DF | Scarlatache | (Romania) | 12 | 14 | 1 | 1113 | 8 | 1 | 2 | | 4 | | |
| 27 | DF | Homei | (Romania) | 5 | 6 | | 512 | 2 | | | | 4 | | |
| 29 | MF | N'Doye | (Senegal) | 15 | 19 | 6 | 1367 | 13 | 5 | 2 | | 4 | 1 | |
| 30 | DF | Garat | (Argentina) | 10 | 13 | 2 | 823 | 10 | 1 | | | 3 | 1 | |
| 31 | DF | Bazzi | (Argentina) | 4 | 5 | | 344 | 4 | | 1 | | | | |

Last updated: 25 May
Ordered by squad number
0 shown as blank

==== Disciplinary record ====
| N | Pos. | Nat. | Name | Yellow card | Second yellow card | Red card | Notes |
|---|---|---|---|---|---|---|---|
| 2 | DF | (Ivory Coast) | Diabaté | 4 | | | |
| 3 | DF | (Spain) | Óscar Rubio | 3 | | | |
| 4 | DF | (Romania) | Moţi | 13 | | 1 | |
| 5 | MF | (Ivory Coast) | Koné | 6 | | | |
| 6 | MF | (Romania) | Mărgăritescu | 2 | | | |
| 7 | MF | (Romania) | C.Munteanu | 5 | | | |
| 8 | MF | (Romania) | Pătraşcu | 1 | | | |
| 9 | FW | (Romania) | Ţucudean | 1 | | | |
| 10 | FW | (Romania) | Alexe | 2 | | | |
| 12 | GK | (Romania) | Dolha | 3 | | | |
| 14 | FW | (Romania) | Păun | | | | |
| 16 | DF | (Romania) | Bordeanu | 3 | | | |
| 17 | DF | (Romania) | Crăciun | | | | |
| 18 | DF | (Romania) | Bărboianu | 5 | | | |
| 19 | FW | (Romania) | Ganea | 3 | 1 | | |
| 20 | MF | (Albania) | Bakaj | 3 | | | |
| 21 | DF | (Romania) | Grigore | 4 | | | |
| 22 | MF | (Romania) | Torje | 10 | | | |
| 24 | DF | (Romania) | Găman | 1 | | | |
| 25 | FW | (Romania) | Dănciulescu | 3 | | | |
| 29 | DF | (Romania) | Mehmedović | | | | |
| 30 | MF | (Romania) | V.Munteanu | 1 | | | |
| 33 | MF | (Romania) | Stănescu | | | | |
| 34 | GK | (Romania) | Bălgrădean | | | 1 | |
Players sold or loaned out during the season
| 1 | GK | (Romania) | Curcă | | | | |
| 3 | DF | (Romania) | Pulhac | 1 | | | |
| 6 | MF | (Romania) | Rus | | | | |
| 9 | FW | (Romania) | Niculae | 2 | 1 | 1 | |
| 16 | DF | (Brazil) | Hélder | 2 | | | |
| 17 | FW | (Romania) | An.Cristea | 1 | | 1 | |
| 18 | DF | (Romania) | Goian | | | | |
| 20 | MF | (Romania) | Ad.Cristea | 2 | | | |
| 25 | DF | (Romania) | Scarlatache | 3 | | | |
| 27 | DF | (Romania) | Homei | 1 | | | |
| 29 | MF | (Senegal) | N'Doye | 8 | 1 | | |
| 30 | DF | (Argentina) | Garat | 4 | 1 | 1 | |
| 31 | DF | (Argentina) | Bazzi | | | | |

Last updated: 25 May
Source: Competitive matches
Only competitive matches
(yellow card) = Number of bookings; (second yellow card) = Number of sending offs after a second yellow card; (red card) = Number of sending offs by a direct red card.

== Club ==
=== Technical staff ===
| Position | Staff |
|---|---|
| Head Coach First Team | (Romania) Ioan Andone |
| Assistant Coach | (Romania) Iulian Mihăescu |
| Goalkeeping Coach | (Romania) Ion Manu |
| Physical fitness coach | (Romania) Constantin Niculae |
| Physical fitness coach | (Italy) Salvatori Nazareno |

Last updated: 1 January
Source: FC Dinamo Official Website

== Competitions ==
=== Overall ===
FC Dinamo played in three competitions: Liga I, UEFA Europa League and Cupa României.

| Competition | Started round | Current position / round | Final position / round | First match | Last match |
|---|---|---|---|---|---|
| Liga I | — | — | 6th | vs. Astra Ploieşti; 25 July 2010 | vs. FC Timișoara; 21 May 2011 |
| Cupa României | Round of 32 | — | Final | vs. Ceahlăul Piatra Neamţ; 22 September 2010 | vs. Steaua București; 25 May 2011 |
| Europa League | Second qualifying round | — | Third qualifying round | vs. Olimpia Bălţi; 15 July 2010 | vs. Hajduk Split; 5 August 2010 |

=== Liga I ===
==== Standings ====
| Pos | Team | Pld | W | D | L | GF | GA | GD | Pts | Qualification or relegation |
|---|---|---|---|---|---|---|---|---|---|---|
| 4 | Rapid București | 34 | 16 | 11 | 7 | 43 | 22 | +21 | 59 | Qualification to Europa League play-off round |
| 5 | Steaua București | 34 | 16 | 9 | 9 | 44 | 27 | +17 | 57 | Qualification to Europa League play-off round (Note: Steaua București won the 2010–11 Cupa României competition and therefore qualified for the play-off round of the 2011–12 UEFA Europa League.) |
| 6 | Dinamo București | 34 | 16 | 8 | 10 | 68 | 52 | +16 | 56 | Qualification to Europa League third qualifying round |
| 7 | Gaz Metan Mediaș | 34 | 14 | 13 | 7 | 41 | 32 | +9 | 55 | Qualification to Europa League second qualifying round |
| 8 | Universitatea Cluj | 34 | 13 | 8 | 13 | 48 | 54 | −6 | 47 | |

Source: LPF (in Romanian)
Rules for classification: 1st points; 2nd head-to-head points; 3rd head-to-head goal difference; 4th head-to-head goals scored; 5th overall goal difference; 6th overall goals scored

==== Results summary ====
| Overall | | | | | | | | Home | | | | | | Away | | | | | |
| Pld | W | D | L | GF | GA | GD | Pts | W | D | L | GF | GA | GD | W | D | L | GF | GA | GD |
|---|---|---|---|---|---|---|---|---|---|---|---|---|---|---|---|---|---|---|---|
| 34 | 16 | 8 | 10 | 68 | 52 | +16 | 56 | 9 | 4 | 4 | 40 | 28 | +12 | 7 | 4 | 6 | 28 | 24 | +4 |

Last updated: 21 May.
Source: Competitive Matches

==== Results by round ====
| Round | 1 | 2 | 3 | 4 | 5 | 6 | 7 | 8 | 9 | 10 | 11 | 12 | 13 | 14 | 15 | 16 | 17 | 18 | 19 | 20 | 21 | 22 | 23 | 24 | 25 | 26 | 27 | 28 | 29 | 30 | 31 | 32 | 33 | 34 |
|---|---|---|---|---|---|---|---|---|---|---|---|---|---|---|---|---|---|---|---|---|---|---|---|---|---|---|---|---|---|---|---|---|---|---|
| Ground | A | H | A | H | A | H | A | H | A | H | H | A | H | A | H | A | H | H | A | H | A | H | A | H | A | H | A | A | H | A | H | A | H | A |
| Result | W | W | D | W | W | L | D | L | L | L | W | W | W | L | D | W | D | D | W | D | D | W | L | W | L | W | D | W | W | L | L | W | W | L |
| Position | 3 | 1 | 1 | 2 | 1 | 2 | 1 | 4 | 6 | 7 | 7 | 6 | 5 | 5 | 6 | 5 | 6 | 6 | 5 | 5 | 6 | 4 | 5 | 5 | 6 | 4 | 6 | 4 | 4 | 4 | 5 | 5 | 5 | 6 |

Updated to match(es) played on 21 May 2011. Source: Competitive Matches
A = Away; H = Home; W = Win; D = Draw; L = Loss

=== Competitive ===
==== Liga I ====
Kickoff times are in EET.

| 25 July 2010 Round 1 | Astra Ploieşti | 1–2 | Dinamo București | Stadionul Astra, Ploieşti |
| 21:00 | Lukacs 33' | Report | 78' (pen.) N'Doye; 90+3' Ad.Cristea; (yellow card) 69' Torje; (yellow card) 78' N'Doye | Attendance: 8,000; Referee: Alexandru Deaconu (București) |

| 1 August 2010 Round 2 | Dinamo București | 5–3 | Sportul Studenţesc | Stadionul Dinamo, București |
| 21:00 | Garat 14'; N'Doye 19' (pen.); Torje 49'; Ganea 70'; Ad.Cristea 89'; C.Munteanu (yellow card) 43'; Koné (yellow card) 76'; Hélder (yellow card) 77'; Ad.Cristea (yellow card) 89' | Report | 53' Curelea; 56' Bălan; 71' Varga | Attendance: 6,000; Referee: Robert Dumitru (Braşov) |

| 8 August 2010 Round 3 | Pandurii Târgu Jiu | 2–2 | Dinamo București | Stadionul Tudor Vladimirescu, Târgu Jiu |
| 21:45 | Orac 42' (pen.); Brata 30' | Report | 84' An.Cristea; 88' Niculae; (yellow card) 2' An.Cristea; (yellow card) 48' Garat; (yellow card) 54' Hélder | Attendance: 4,500; Referee: Marius Avram (București) |

| 15 August 2010 Round 4 | Dinamo București | 3–2 | Rapid | Stadionul Dinamo, București |
| 20:00 | Torje 65'; Ganea 51', 62'; Torje (yellow card) 32'; Garat (yellow card) 45' (yellow-red card) 89'; Ganea (yellow card) 88' | Report | 15', 44' Herea | Attendance: 10,000; Referee: Cristian Balaj (Baia Mare) |

| 21 August 2010 Round 5 | FCM Târgu Mureş | 2–6 | Dinamo București | Stadionul Trans-Sil, Târgu Mureş |
| 18:00 | Fl.Dan 30' (pen.); Vancea 67' | Report | 5' (o.g.) Topić; 9' N'Doye; 53' Ganea; 64' Niculae; 88' C.Munteanu; 90' (pen.) An.Cristea; (yellow card) 9' N'Doye; (red card) 30' Moţi | Attendance: 7,500; Referee: Istvan Kovacs (Carei) |

| 27 August 2010 Round 6 | Dinamo București | 3–4 | U Cluj | Stadionul Dinamo, București |
| 20:30 | Ad.Cristea 22'; Torje 25'; N'Doye 88'; Garat (yellow card) 4' | Report | 18', 59' Niculescu; 31' Lemnaru; 36' Delgado | Attendance: 5,000; Referee: Alexandru Deaconu (București) |

| 12 September 2010 Round 7 | FC Brașov | 2–2 | Dinamo București | Stadionul Silviu Ploeşteanu, Braşov |
| 21:00 | Chipciu 31'; Dedu 76'; Diarrassouba (yellow card) 50' (yellow-red card) 52' | Report | 71' (pen.) Ad.Cristea; 87' N'Doye; (yellow card) 43' Moţi; (yellow card) 82' Dănciulescu | Attendance: 7,000; Referee: Ovidiu Haţegan (Arad) |

| 19 September 2010 Round 8 | Dinamo București | 1–2 | FC Vaslui | Stadionul Dinamo, București |
| 20:30 | Ganea 18'; Moţi (yellow card) 47'; Garat (yellow card) 51' | Report | 33' (o.g.) Bordeanu; 39' Wesley | Attendance: 5,000; Referee: Augustus Constantin (Râmnicu Vâlcea) |

| 27 September 2010 Round 9 | Unirea Urziceni | 1–0 | Dinamo București | Stadionul Tineretului, Urziceni |
| 20:30 | Rusescu 34' (pen.) | Report | | Attendance: 4,000; Referee: Adrian Comănescu (Râmnicu Vâlcea) |

| 1 October 2010 Round 10 | Dinamo București | 1–2 | Oţelul Galaţi | Stadionul Dinamo, București |
| 20:30 | C.Munteanu 72'; Dolha (yellow card) 22'; Scarlatache (yellow card) 41'; N'Doye (yellow card) 43'; Bordeanu (yellow card) 47'; An.Cristea (red card) 89' | Report | 44' Sălăgeanu; 75' Ilie | Attendance: 6,000; Referee: Cristian Balaj (Baia Mare) |

| 17 October 2010 Round 11 | Dinamo București | 2–1 | Steaua București | Stadionul Dinamo, București |
| 20:30 | Ad.Cristea 31' (pen.); Niculae 35' (pen.); N'Doye (yellow card) 3'; Torje (yellow card) 21'; Niculae (yellow card) 36'; Alexe (yellow card) 56' | Report | 23' Stancu | Attendance: 15,000; Referee: Marius Avram (București) |

| 22 October 2010 Round 12 | Gloria Bistriţa | 0–2 | Dinamo București | Stadionul Gloria, Bistriţa |
| 20:30 | | Report | 15' Dănciulescu; 90' An.Cristea; (yellow card) 53' Koné; (yellow card) 70' Moţi; (yellow card) 90' Bordeanu | Attendance: 5,000; Referee: Istvan Kovacs (Carei) |

| 29 October 2010 Round 13 | Dinamo București | 3–2 | Gaz Metan Mediaş | Stadionul Dinamo, București |
| 20:30 | Alexe 16'; An.Cristea 70' (pen.); Scarlatache 73'; Grigore (yellow card) 65'; Ganea (yellow card) 78'; Scarlatache (yellow card) 80'; Dolha (yellow card) 89' | Report | 22' Liţu; 35' Trtovac | Attendance: 3,000; Referee: Marian Balaci (Drobeta Turnu Severin) |

| 7 November 2010 Round 14 | CFR Cluj | 1–0 | Dinamo București | Stadionul Dr. Constantin Rădulescu, Cluj-Napoca |
| 20:00 | Bjelanović 25' | Report | (yellow card) 57' (yellow-red card) 86' N'Doye; (yellow card) 68' Moţi | Attendance: 10,673; Referee: Alexandru Deaconu (București) |

| 14 November 2010 Round 15 | Dinamo București | 2–2 | Universitatea Craiova | Stadionul Dinamo, București |
| 19:45 | Ad.Cristea 22' (pen.); Torje 34'; Niculae (yellow card) 15' (yellow-red card) 90'; Alexe (yellow card) 31'; Torje (yellow card) 41' | Report | 14', 83' Piţurcă | Attendance: 9,000; Referee: Cristian Balaj (Baia Mare) |

| 22 November 2010 Round 16 | Victoria Brăneşti | 2–4 | Dinamo București | Stadionul Municipal, Buzău |
| 20:30 | Maghici 62'; Simion 71'; Bar (red card) 59' | Report | 28' Dănciulescu; 52' Koné; 60' Rubio; 67' Alexe; (yellow card) 70' Grigore | Attendance: 6,000; Referee: Adrian Comănescu (Rm. Vâlcea) |

| 27 November 2010 Round 17 | Dinamo București | 0–0 | FC Timișoara | Stadionul Dinamo, București |
| 21:45 | Torje (yellow card) 27'; Diabaté (yellow card) 54'; C.Munteanu (yellow card) 86' | Report | | Attendance: 7,000; Referee: Robert Dumitru (Braşov) |

| 4 December 2010 Round 18 | Dinamo București | 2–2 | Astra Ploieşti | Stadionul Dinamo, București |
| 20:30 | C.Munteanu 57' (pen.); Ad.Cristea 60'; Torje (yellow card) 76'; Scarlatache (yellow card) 79' | Report | 15' Takayuki; 38' Opršal | Attendance: 500; Referee: Mihai Prodan (Cluj-Napoca) |

| 26 February 2011 Round 19 | Sportul Studenţesc | 0–1 | Dinamo București | Stadionul Regie, București |
| 14:30 | | Report | 36' C.Munteanu; (yellow card) 65' Dănciulescu; (yellow card) 90' V.Munteanu | Attendance: 3,000; Referee: Alexandru Deaconu (București) |

| 4 March 2011 Round 20 | Dinamo București | 2–2 | Pandurii Târgu Jiu | Stadionul Dinamo, București |
| 20:30 | Alexe 4'; Torje 58'; Diabaté (yellow card) 20' | Report | 41' Apostu; 85' (pen.) Voiculeţ | Attendance: 3,500; Referee: Adrian Comănescu (Râmnicu-Vâlcea) |

| 12 March 2011 Round 21 | Rapid București | 0–0 | Dinamo București | Stadionul Giuleşti-Valentin Stănescu, București |
| 20:00 | | Report | (yellow card) 36' Rubio; (yellow card) 69' Koné; (yellow card) 73' Grigore; (yellow card) 82' Moţi | Attendance: 14,000; Referee: Robert Dumitru (Braşov) |

| 20 March 2011 Round 22 | Dinamo București | 4–1 | FCM Târgu Mureş | Stadionul Dinamo, București |
| 20:00 | Ganea 29'; Torje 45', 65'; Dănciulescu 69'; Moţi (yellow card) 39'; Torje (yellow card) 62' | Report | 77' (o.g.) Ganea | Attendance: 3,000; Referee: Ionel Ivan (Brăila) |

| 1 April 2011 Round 23 | Universitatea Cluj | 2–1 | Dinamo București | Stadionul Gaz Metan, Mediaş |
| 20:30 | Niculescu 17'; Menassel 72' | Report | 36' Dănciulescu | Attendance: 7,000; Referee: Alexandru Tudor (București) |

| 6 April 2011 Round 24 | Dinamo București | 2–1 | FC Brașov | Stadionul Dinamo, București |
| 20:00 | Alexe 40'; Ganea 54'; C.Munteanu (yellow card) 30'; Dolha (yellow card) 78'; Bărboianu (yellow card) 90' | Report | 20' Viveiros | Attendance: 3,000; Referee: Adrian Comănescu (Rm. Vâlcea) |

| 9 April 2011 Round 25 | FC Vaslui | 2–0 | Dinamo București | Stadionul Municipal, Vaslui |
| 17:00 | Wesley 24'; Cânu 48' | Report | (yellow card) 37' Pătraşcu; (yellow card) 47' Rubio; (yellow card) 77' Diabaté | Attendance: 7,000; Referee: Robert Dumitru (Braşov) |

| 12 April 2011 Round 26 | Dinamo București | 3–1 | Unirea Urziceni | Stadionul Dinamo, București |
| 14:00 | Mehmedović 20'; Dănciulescu 27' (pen.); Bakaj 90'; Bărboianu (yellow card) 76' | Report | 37' Mihalcea | Attendance: 1,100; Referee: Cristian Sava (Bacău) |

| 16 April 2011 Round 27 | Oţelul Galaţi | 3–3 | Dinamo București | Stadionul Oţelul, Galaţi |
| 14:00 | Antal 30'; Giurgiu 52'; Pena 54' | Report | 36' C.Munteanu; 86' Ţucudean; 90' Grigore | Attendance: 10,000; Referee: Cristian Balaj (Baia Mare) |

| 25 April 2011 Round 28 | Steaua București | 0–1 | Dinamo București | Stadionul Steaua, București |
| 20:30 | | Report | 62' Torje; (yellow card) 21' C.Munteanu; (yellow card) 43' Bărboianu; (yellow card) 72' Ţucudean; (yellow card) 74' Bordeanu | Attendance: 23,000; Referee: Marius Avram (București) |

| 28 April 2011 Round 29 | Dinamo București | 3–0 | Gloria Bistriţa | Stadionul Dinamo, București |
| 14:00 | Ganea 20'; Bakaj 47'; Torje 75'; Diabaté (yellow card) 25' | Report | | Attendance: 0 Referee: Lucian Rusandu (Sf. Gheorghe) |

| 2 May 2011 Round 30 | Gaz Metan Mediaş | 2–1 | Dinamo București | Stadionul Gaz Metan, Mediaş |
| 18:30 | Bawab 35'; Pârvulescu 90+4' | Report | 90+2' Alexe; (yellow card) 57' Moţi; (yellow card) 64' Koné; (yellow card) 75' Bărboianu | Attendance: 6,000; Referee: Istvan Kovacs (Carei) |

| 6 May 2011 Round 31 | Dinamo București | 1–2 | CFR Cluj | Stadionul Dinamo, București |
| 20:20 | Dănciulescu 13' (pen.); Bakaj (yellow card) 65' | Report | 19' Batin; 76' Hora | Attendance: 5,000; Referee: Adrian Comănescu (Rm. Vâlcea) |

| 9 May 2011 Round 32 | Universitatea Craiova | 0–2 | Dinamo București | Ion Oblemenco, Craiova |
| 20:00 | | Report | 5' Koné; 40' Bakaj; (yellow card) 35' Moţi; (yellow card) 42' C.Munteanu; (yellow card) 88' Mărgăritescu | Attendance: 6,000; Referee: Alexandru Tudor (București) |

| 16 May 2011 Round 33 | Dinamo București | 3–1 | Victoria Brăneşti | Stadionul Dinamo, București |
| 21:45 | Bakaj 2'; Koné 65'; Dănciulescu 83'; Bărboianu (yellow card) 57'; Bălgrădean (red card) 75' | Report | 57' (pen.) Ispir | Attendance: 2,000; Referee: Claudiu Baboia (București) |

| 21 May 2011 Round 34 | FC Timișoara | 4–1 | Dinamo București | Stadionul Dan Păltinişanu, Timișoara |
| 17:00 | Luchin 14'; Nikolić 38', 59'; Ignjatijević 78' | Report | 27' Ţucudean; (yellow card) 16' Óscar Rubio; (yellow card) 55' Dănciulescu; (yellow card) 71' Koné; (yellow card) 85' Bakaj | Attendance: 16,000; Referee: Ovidiu Haţegan (Arad) |

==== UEFA Europa League ====
===== Results by round =====
| 15 July 2nd qual, 1st leg | Olimpia Bălţi (Moldova) | 0–2 | (Romania) Dinamo București | Zimbru Stadium, Chișinău |
| 19:00 EET | Cheltuială (yellow card) 41' (yellow-red card) 88' | Report | Pulhac 41'; Ganea 83'; Niculae (red card) 58' | Attendance: 9,000; Referee: Michael Koukoulakis (Greece) |

| 22 July 2nd qual, 2nd leg | Dinamo București (Romania) | 5–1 | (Moldova) Olimpia Bălţi | Stadionul Dinamo, București |
| 20:45 EET | An.Cristea 2'; Ad.Cristea 32'; N'Doye 45'; Munteanu 59'; Torje 63' (pen.) | Report | Adaramola 89' | Attendance: 3,000; Referee: Antonio Damato (Italia) |

| 29 July 3rd qual, 1st leg | Dinamo București (Romania) | 3–1 | (Croatia) Hajduk Split | Stadionul Dinamo, București |
| 21:00 EET | An.Cristea 6' (pen.); Garat 40'; Koné 70' | Report | Tomasov 64' | Attendance: 10,000; Referee: Lee Probert (England) |

| 5 August 3rd qual, 2nd leg | Hajduk Split (Croatia) | 3–0 | (Romania) Dinamo București | Poljud, Split |
| 21:30 EET | Vukušić 12'; Brkljaca 23'; Tomasov 38' | Report | | Attendance: 28,000; Referee: Carlos Xistra (Portugal) |

==== Cupa României ====
| 22 September 2010 Round of 32 | Dinamo București | 2–0 | Ceahlăul Piatra Neamţ | Stadionul Dinamo, București |
| 20:30 | Moţi 12'; An.Cristea 60' (pen.); N'Doye (yellow card) 87' | | (yellow card) 18' (yellow-red card) 38' Gafiţa | Attendance: 2,500; Referee: Mugurel Drăgănescu (Breaza) |

| 26 October 2010 Round of 16 | Dinamo București | 3–1 | Alro Slatina | Stadionul Dinamo, București |
| 21:00 | Niculae 2'; Alexe 8', 30'; Grigore (yellow card) 74' | Report | 38' Bârsan | Attendance: 3,000; Referee: Georgian Ionescu (Buzău) |

| 10 November 2010 Quarterfinals | Dinamo București | 1–1 (3–1 p) | Universitatea Craiova | Stadionul Dinamo, București |
| 20:45 | Munteanu 66'; Torje (yellow card) 17'; Moţi (yellow card) 63'; Ganea (yellow card) 77' (yellow-red card) 78' | Report | 31' Dina | Attendance: 10,000; Referee: Robert Dumitru (Braşov) |
| | Penalties |
| | An.Cristea (penalty scored); Munteanu (penalty scored); Ad.Cristea (penalty scored); Bordeanu (penalty missed) | | (penalty missed) Găman; (penalty missed) Bărboianu; (penalty scored) Ologu; (penalty missed) Costea |

| 20 April 2011 Semifinals – leg 1 | Gloria Bistriţa | 0–2 | Dinamo București | Stadionul Gloria, Bistriţa |
| 20:45 | | Report | 53' Dănciulescu; 87' Alexe | Attendance: 7,000; Referee: Augustus Constantin (Rm. Vâlcea) |

| 12 May 2011 Semifinals – leg 2 | Dinamo București | 5–1 | Gloria Bistriţa | Stadionul Dinamo, București |
| 20:45 | V.Munteanu 8'; Dănciulescu 27' (pen.), 61'; Ţucudean 54', 90'; Găman (yellow card) 31'; Moţi (yellow card) 62' | Report | 44' Pădurariu | Attendance: 4,000; Referee: Sebastian Colţescu (Craiova) |

| 25 May 2011 Final | Dinamo București | 1–2 | Steaua București | Stadionul Silviu Ploieşteanu, Braşov |
| 21:15 | Torje 33'; Moţi (yellow card) 16'; Torje (yellow card) 68'; Mărgăritescu (yellow card) 78'; Bakaj (yellow card) 90' | Report | 24' Dică; 50' (o.g.) Bărboianu | Attendance: 8,000; Referee: Marius Avram (București) |

=== Non competitive matches ===
| 28 June 2010 Salzburgerland Cup | Maccabi Haifa (Israel) | 1–1 | (Romania) Dinamo București |
| 19:00 EET | Ghadir 55' | | Scarlatache 71' | Referee: Alexandru Tudor |

| 30 June 2010 Salzburgerland Cup | Austria Wien | 4–3 | (Romania) Dinamo București |
| 19:30 EET | Ortlechner 41'; Linz 61'; Tiffner 65'; Junuzović 68' | | An.Cristea 30' (pen.); Niculescu 72'; Niculae 82' |

| 1 July 2010 Friendly | Universitatea Cluj | 1–0 | Dinamo București |
| 19:00 EET | Machado 29' (pen.) | | | Referee: Cristian Balaj |

| 2 July 2010 Salzburgerland Cup | Lokomotiv Moscow (Russia) | 1–0 | (Romania) Dinamo București |
| 15:00 EET | Asatiani 14' | | | Referee: Cristian Balaj |

| 4 July 2010 Friendly | Red Bull Salzburg (Austria) | 2–1 | (Romania) Dinamo București | Salzburg, Austria |
| | Jantscher 31'; Schiemer 35' | | Ganea 90' | Stadium: Red Bull Arena |

| 4 September 2010 Friendly | Gaziantepspor (Turkey) | 2–2 | (Romania) Dinamo București | Gaziantep, Turkey |
| | Beto 31'; Olcan Adın 81' | | Niculae 47'; Dănciulescu 57' | Stadium: Gaziantep Kamil Ocak Stadium |

| 8 October 2010 Friendly | Karlsruher SC (Germany) | 1–0 | (Romania) Dinamo București | Karlsruhe, Germany |
| | Smith 85' | Report | | Stadium: Wildparkstadion |

| 26 January 2011 Friendly | Austria Wien | 3–0 | (Romania) Dinamo București |
| 15:00 EET | Barazite 12', 61'; Tadić 59' | Report |

| 28 January 2011 Friendly | Obolon Kyiv (Ukraine) | 0–2 | (Romania) Dinamo București |
| 17:00 EET | | Report | Moţi 53'; Stănescu 90' |

| 30 January 2011 Friendly | Partizan (Serbia) | 0–0 | (Romania) Dinamo București |
| 18:00 EET | | Report |

| 2 February 2011 Friendly | Dacia Chișinău (Moldova) | 0–4 | (Romania) Dinamo București |
| 18:00 EET | | Report | Popovici 28' (o.g.); Păun 82'; Ţucudean 85'; Stănescu 86' |

| 4 February 2011 Friendly | Hajduk Split (Croatia) | 1–1 | (Romania) Dinamo București |
| 18:00 EET | Trebotić 8' | Report | Koné 12' |

| 6 February 2011 Friendly | Gyeongnam FC (South Korea) | 0–0 | (Romania) Dinamo București |
| 16:00 EET | | Report |

| 8 February 2011 Friendly | Olimpija (Slovenia) | 2–0 | (Romania) Dinamo București |
| | Vršič 26' (pen.); Jović 64' | Report |

| 13 February 2011 Friendly | FK Andijan (Uzbekistan) | 0–1 | (Romania) Dinamo București |
| 18:00 EET | | Report | Bakaj 57' |
