= 2011–12 FC Dinamo București season =

FC Dinamo București
2011–12 season
- Chairman: Nicolae Badea
- Manager: Liviu Ciobotariu (until 10 April 2012); Dario Bonetti
- Liga I: 5th
- Cupa României: Winners
- UEFA Europa League: Play-off
- Top goalscorer: League: Marius Niculae – 19; All: Marius Niculae – 20
- Highest home attendance: 24,000 (3 March v. Gaz Metan)
Home colours	Away colours

The 2011–12 season was FC Dinamo București's 63rd consecutive season in Liga I. In this season, Dinamo played in Liga I, Cupa României and UEFA Europa League, due to the 6th place occupied in the previous season of the Championship.

Dinamo started the season with a new coach, Liviu Ciobotariu, who took the place left by Ioan Andone. The team left again quickly the European scene, being eliminated in the play-off round by the Ukrainian side Vorskla Poltava. In the Liga I, Dinamo had an unexpected start of the season, with five consecutive wins. After the first half of the competition, Dinamo was leading, with one point advantage over the second place, CFR Cluj.

The Spring started badly for Dinamo, with a couple of home defeats against teams that were fighting against relegation (Sportul Studențesc and Petrolul Ploiești). The club decided to sack Ciobotariu and replace him with Dario Bonetti, an Italian manager who led the team in 2008 for a couple of months. But the new management didn't change the fortune of the squad that continued to fall and ended the season only fifth, nine points behind the champions, CFR Cluj.

Instead, Dinamo won the Romanian Cup, their first trophy after five years, and the first trophy in this competition after seven seasons. By virtue of winning the League Cup, Dinamo qualified for the playoffs in the 2012–13 UEFA Europa League.

== Players ==
=== Current squad ===
Updated last on 28 February 2012

No.	Name	Nationality	Position	Date of Birth (Age)	Signed from	Signed in	Contract ends
Goalkeepers
23	Kristijan Naumovski	(North Macedonia)	GK	17 September 1988 (age 37)	Rabotnički	2010	2015
34	Cristian Bălgrădean	(Romania)	GK	21 March 1988 (age 38)	UTA Arad	2010	2014
Defenders
2	Constantin Nica	(Romania)	RB	18 March 1993 (age 33)	Academy	2010	Unknown
3	Cristian Pulhac	(Romania)	LB	17 August 1984 (age 42)	Academy	2002	Unknown
15	Adrian Scarlatache	(Romania)	RB	5 December 1986 (age 39)	Academy	2004	Unknown
21	Dragoș Grigore	(Romania)	CB	7 September 1986 (age 39)	CFR Timişoara	2008	Unknown
24	Srdjan Luchin	(Romania)	RB	4 March 1986 (age 40)	Poli Timişoara	2011	2016
30	Cosmin Moți	(Romania)	CB	3 December 1984 (age 41)	Universitatea Craiova	2005	Unknown
Midfielders
4	Cosmin Matei	(Romania)	AM	30 September 1991 (age 34)	Astra Ploieşti	2012	2016
5	Djakaridja Koné	(Burkina Faso)	DM	22 July 1986 (age 40)	Hapoel Petah Tikva	2009	2012
6	Dorel Stoica	(Romania)	DM	15 December 1978 (age 47)	Universitatea Craiova	2011	2013
7	Cătălin Munteanu	(Romania)	CM	26 January 1979 (age 47)	FC Brașov	2010	2014
14	Dan Bucșă	(Romania)	CM	23 June 1988 (age 38)	Universitatea Cluj	2010	Unknown
19	Iulian Tameș	(Romania)	CM	6 December 1978 (age 47)	Poli Timişoara	2012	2012
20	Alexandru Curtean	(Romania)	LM	27 March 1987 (age 39)	Poli Timişoara	2012	2016
22	Sorin Strătilă	(Romania)	RM	20 October 1986 (age 39)	Astra Ploiești	2012	2015
26	Laurențiu Rus	(Romania)	RM	7 May 1985 (age 41)	Liberty Salonta	2009	Unknown
32	Nicolae Mușat	(Romania)	LM	4 December 1986 (age 39)	Academy	2005	Unknown
Forwards
8	Michel Platini	(Brazil)	ST	8 September 1983 (age 42)	CSKA Sofia	2012	2015
9	Marius Niculae	(Romania)	ST	16 May 1981 (age 45)	Inverness	2008	2014
10	Marius Alexe	(Romania)	FW	22 February 1990 (age 36)	Academy	2009	Unknown
25	Ionel Dănciulescu	(Romania)	ST	6 December 1976 (age 49)	Hércules	2010	2013
29	George Ţucudean	(Romania)	ST	30 April 1991 (age 35)	UTA Arad	2010	2015

=== Squad changes ===
Transfers in:

No.	Pos.	Nat.	Name	Age	EU	Moving from	Type	Transfer window	Ends	Transfer fee	Source
1	GK	(Romania)	George Curcă	30	EU	Unirea Urziceni (Romania)	Return	Summer		—	
3	LB	(Romania)	Cristian Pulhac	26	EU	Hercules (Netherlands)	Return	Summer		—	
15	CB	(Romania)	Adrian Scarlatache	24	EU	Khazar Lankaran (Azerbaijan)	Return	Summer		—	
32	LB	(Romania)	Nicolae Mușat	24	EU	Khazar Lankaran (Azerbaijan)	Return	Summer		—	
	CM	(Romania)	Hristu Chiacu	25	EU	Khazar Lankaran (Azerbaijan)	Return	Summer		—	
9	FW	(Romania)	Marius Niculae	30	EU	Kavala (Greece)	Return	Summer		—	
26	MF	(Romania)	Laurențiu Rus	26	EU	Târgu Mureș (Romania)	Return	Summer		—	
6	DF	(Romania)	Dorel Stoica	32	EU	Free agent	Transfer	Summer	2013	—	fcdinamo.ro
24	DF	(Romania)	Srdjan Luchin	25	EU	Politehnica Timișoara (Romania)	Transfer	Summer	2016	—	fcdinamo.ro
22	MF	(Romania)	Sorin Strătilă	25	EU	Astra Ploiești (Romania)	Transfer	Winter	2015	Undisclosed	fcdinamo.ro
20	MF	(Romania)	Alexandru Curtean	24	EU	Politehnica Timișoara (Romania)	Transfer	Winter	2016	Undisclosed	fcdinamo.ro
4	MF	(Romania)	Cosmin Matei	20	EU	Astra Ploiești (Romania)	Transfer	Winter	2016	Undisclosed	gsp.ro
19	MF	(Romania)	Iulian Tameș	33	EU	Politehnica Timișoara (Romania)	Transfer	Winter	2012	Undisclosed	fcdinamo.ro
8	FW	(Brazil)	Michel Platini	28	Non-EU	CSKA Sofia (Bulgaria)	Transfer	Winter	2015	Undisclosed	fcdinamo.ro

Transfers out:

No.	Pos.	Nat.	Name	Age	EU	Moving to	Type	Transfer window	Transfer fee	Source
	GK	(Romania)	Emilian Dolha	31	EU		Released	Summer		
	RB	(Spain)	Óscar Rubio	27	EU		Released	Summer		
	LB	(Romania)	Valeriu Bordeanu	34	EU		Released	Summer		
	CB	(Serbia)	Ersin Mehmedović	30			Released	Summer		
	LM	(Romania)	Vlad Munteanu	30	EU		Released	Summer		
	RB	(Romania)	Ștefan Bărboianu	23	EU		Released	Summer		
	CB	(Romania)	Valerică Găman	22	EU		Released	Summer		
	CM	(Romania)	Andrei Mărgăritescu	31	EU	Mioveni (Romania)	Transfer	Summer	Undisclosed	
	RB	(Romania)	Eugen Crăciun	25	EU	Mioveni (Romania)	Transfer	Summer	Undisclosed	
	RM	(Romania)	Gabriel Torje	21	EU	Udinese (Italy)	Transfer	Summer	Undisclosed	udinese.it
	LB	(Ivory Coast)	Zié Diabaté	22	Non-EU	Dijon (France)	Transfer	Winter	Undisclosed	dfco.fr
	FW	(Romania)	Liviu Ganea	23	EU	CFR Cluj (Romania)	Transfer	Winter	Undisclosed	cfr1907.ro
	DM	(Romania)	Bogdan Pătrașcu	32	EU	Astra Ploiești (Romania)	Transfer	Winter	Undisclosed	fcastraploiesti.ro

Last updated: 2012-2-28

Loans out:

No.	Pos.	Nat.	Name	Age	EU	Moving to	Type	Transfer window	Transfer fee	Source
	RM	(Romania)	Hristu Chiacu	24	EU	Ceahlăul Piatra Neamț (Romania)		Summer		
	FW	(Romania)	Georgian Păun	26	EU	CSKA Sofia (Bulgaria)		Winter		sportal.bg
	CM	(Albania)	Elis Bakaj	24	Non-EU	Chornomorets Odesa (Ukraine)		Winter		fcdinamo.ro
	DF	(Romania)	Sergiu Homei	24	EU	Târgu Mureș (Romania)		Winter		
	GK	(Romania)	George Curcă	30	EU	Farul Constanța (Romania)		Winter		
	RM	(Romania)	Hristu Chiacu	25	EU	Concordia Chiajna (Romania)		Winter		

Last updated: 2012-2-28

=== Player statistics ===
==== Squad stats ====
				Total				Liga I		Cupa României		Europa League		
N	Pos.	Name	Nat.	GS	App	Gls	Min	App	Gls	App	Gls	App	Gls	Notes
23	GK	Naumovski	(North Macedonia)	7	7	-5	630	4	-5	3				(−) means goals conceded
34	GK	Bălgrădean	(Romania)	37	37	-38	3330	30	-27	3	-3	4	-8	(−) means goals conceded
2	DF	Nica	(Romania)	3	3		241	3						
3	DF	Pulhac	(Romania)	16	18		1322	15		3				
4	MF	Matei	(Romania)	4	8	2	305	7	2	1				
5	MF	Koné	(Ivory Coast)	37	37	1	3330	28	1	5		4		
6	DF	Stoica	(Romania)	10	14	2	865	10	1	2	1	2		
7	MF	Munteanu	(Romania)	31	34	3	2903	25	2	5		4	1	
8	FW	Platini	(Brazil)	4	9		406	8		1				
9	FW	Niculae	(Romania)	36	37	20	3151	29	19	4		4	1	
10	FW	Alexe	(Romania)	28	34	5	2142	27	5	4		3		
14	MF	Bucşă	(Romania)		2		2	2						
15	DF	Scarlatache	(Romania)	27	30	1	2500	21		5	1	4		
17	MF	Scărlătescu	(Romania)	1	1		45			1				
19	MF	Tameş	(Romania)	5	9	1	512	8	1	1				
20	MF	Curtean	(Romania)	10	14	2	907	12	2	2				
21	DF	Grigore	(Romania)	36	36	1	3194	29	1	6		1		
22	MF	Strătilă	(Romania)	3	11		412	11						
24	DF	Luchin	(Romania)	29	30	2	2561	24		6	2			
25	FW	Dănciulescu	(Romania)	36	40	15	3047	32	13	4	1	4	1	
26	MF	Rus	(Romania)	37	39	2	3169	31	1	5	1	3		
29	FW	Ţucudean	(Romania)	5	30	4	829	23	2	4	1	3	1	
30	DF	Moţi	(Romania)	33	33	3	2883	25	2	4		4	1	
32	DF	Muşat	(Romania)	4	8		405	7		1				
33	MF	Stănescu	(Romania)		2	1	48	2	1					
Players sold or loaned out during the season
2	DF	Diabaté	(Ivory Coast)	23	24		2081	17		3		4		
8	MF	Pătraşcu	(Romania)	5	12		481	9		2		1		
14	FW	Păun	(Romania)	1	6	1	194	2		3	1	1		
19	FW	Ganea	(Romania)	3	13	4	497	9	1	2	3	2		
20	MF	Bakaj	(Albania)	3	14	1	374	11	1	2		1		
22	MF	Torje	(Romania)	8	9	2	718	5	1			4	1	

Last updated: 23 May
Ordered by squad number
0 shown as blank

==== Disciplinary record ====
Includes all competitive matches.

Last updated on 23 May 2012

No.	Pos	Name	Liga I			Cupa României			Europa League			Total		
No.	Pos	Name	Booked	(yellow card) (yellow-red card)	Sent off (straight red)	Booked	(yellow card) (yellow-red card)	Sent off (straight red)	Booked	(yellow card) (yellow-red card)	Sent off (straight red)	Booked	(yellow card) (yellow-red card)	Sent off (straight red)
2	DF	Constantin Nica	1	0	0	0	0	0	0	0	0	1	0	0
3	DF	Cristian Pulhac	5	0	0	0	0	0	0	0	0	5	0	0
4	MF	Cosmin Matei	0	1	0	0	0	0	0	0	0	0	1	0
5	MF	Djakaridja Koné	8	0	0	1	0	0	0	0	0	9	0	0
7	MF	Cătălin Munteanu	5	0	0	0	0	0	1	0	0	6	0	0
8	FW	Michel Platini	1	0	0	0	0	0	0	0	0	1	0	0
9	FW	Marius Niculae	6	0	1	2	0	0	2	0	0	10	0	1
10	FW	Marius Alexe	2	0	0	0	0	0	2	0	0	4	0	0
15	DF	Adrian Scarlatache	5	0	0	0	0	0	1	0	0	6	0	0
20	MF	Alexandru Curtean	3	0	0	0	0	0	0	0	0	3	0	0
21	DF	Dragoș Grigore	10	0	0	1	0	0	0	1	0	11	1	0
23	GK	Kristijan Naumovski	0	0	0	1	0	0	0	0	0	1	0	0
24	DF	Srdjan Luchin	7	0	0	1	0	0	0	0	0	8	0	0
25	FW	Ionel Dănciulescu	5	0	0	1	0	0	0	0	0	6	0	0
26	MF	Laurențiu Rus	8	0	0	0	0	0	1	0	0	9	0	0
29	FW	George Ţucudean	5	0	0	0	0	0	1	0	0	6	0	0
30	DF	Cosmin Moți	9	1	0	2	0	1	0	0	0	11	1	1
32	MF	Nicolae Mușat	1	0	0	0	0	0	0	0	0	1	0	0
34	GK	Cristian Bălgrădean	3	0	0	1	0	0	0	0	0	4	0	0
Players sold or loaned out during the season
2	DF	Zie Diabaté	4	0	0	0	0	0	1	0	0	5	0	0
8	MF	Bogdan Pătrașcu	1	0	0	0	0	0	0	0	0	1	0	0
14	FW	Georgian Păun	1	0	0	0	0	0	1	0	0	2	0	0
20	MF	Elis Bakaj	3	0	0	0	0	0	0	0	0	3	0	0
22	MF	Gabriel Torje	1	0	0	0	0	0	1	0	0	2	0	0

== Club ==
=== Technical staff ===
Position	Staff
Head Coach First Team	(Italy) Dario Bonetti
Assistant Coach	(Italy) Alessandro Birindelli
Goalkeeping Coach	(Italy) Claudio Bozzini
Physical fitness coach	(Romania) Constantin Niculae
Physical fitness coach	(Italy) Umberto Ruggiero

Last updated: 10 April
Source: FC Dinamo Official Website

== Competitions ==
=== Overall ===
FC Dinamo plays in three competitions: Liga I, UEFA Europa League and Cupa României.

Competition	Started round	Current position / round	Final position / round	First match	Last match
Liga I	Round 1	—	5	vs. FCM Târgu Mureş; 22 July 2011	vs. Astra Ploieşti; 20 May 2012
Cupa României	Round of 32	—	Winners	vs. Luceafărul Oradea; 22 September 2011	vs. Rapid București; 23 May 2012
Europa League	Third qualifying round	—	Play-off round	vs. Varaždin; 28 July 2011	vs. Vorskla; 25 August 2011

=== Liga I ===
==== Standings ====
Pos	Team	Pld	W	D	L	GF	GA	GD	Pts	Qualification or relegation
3	Steaua București	34	19	9	6	47	26	+21	66	Qualification to Europa League third qualifying round
4	Rapid București	34	18	10	6	54	29	+25	64	Qualification to Europa League second qualifying round
5	Dinamo București	34	18	8	8	57	32	+25	62	Qualification to Europa League play-off round (Note: Dinamo București won the 2011–12 Cupa României so it qualified for the 2012–13 UEFA Europa League play-off round.)
6	Oțelul Galați	34	15	7	12	34	29	+5	52	
7	Pandurii Târgu Jiu	34	12	11	11	47	40	+7	47 (Note: PAN 1–0 UCL; UCL 0–1 PAN)	

Source: LPF (in Romanian)
Rules for classification: 1st points; 2nd overall goals difference; 3rd overall goals scored (until the end of the season)

==== Results summary ====
Overall								Home						Away					
Pld	W	D	L	GF	GA	GD	Pts	W	D	L	GF	GA	GD	W	D	L	GF	GA	GD
34	18	8	8	57	32	+25	62	9	3	5	25	17	+8	9	5	3	32	15	+17

Last updated: 20 May.
Source: Competitive Matches

==== Results by round ====
Round	1	2	3	4	5	6	7	8	9	10	11	12	13	14	15	16	17	18	19	20	21	22	23	24	25	26	27	28	29	30	31	32	33	34
Ground	H	A	H	A	H	A	H	A	H	A	H	A	A	H	A	H	A	A	H	A	H	A	H	A	H	A	H	A	H	H	A	H	A	H
Result	W	W	W	W	W	L	D	W	W	W	D	D	W	W	W	L	D	W	W	D	L	D	L	D	L	W	W	L	D	L	W	W	L	W
Position	6	1	1	1	1	1	1	1	1	1	1	1	1	1	1	1	1	1	1	1	2	2	2	2	2	2	1	3	4	5	5	4	5	5

Updated to match(es) played on 20 May 2012. Source: Competitive Matches
A = Away; H = Home; W = Win; D = Draw; L = Loss

=== Competitive ===
==== Liga I ====
Kickoff times are in EET.

==== Results ====
22 July 1	Dinamo București	1–0	FCM Târgu Mureş	Stadionul Astra, Ploieşti
20:20	Niculae 12'; Grigore (yellow card) 23'	Report		Attendance: 4,000; Referee: Augustus Constantin (Râmnicu Vâlcea)

31 July 2	Gaz Metan Mediaş	0–5	Dinamo București	Stadionul Gaz Metan, Mediaş
21:30		Report	Munteanu 40' (pen.); Dănciulescu 58'; Niculae 77', 87'; Torje 90+1'; Koné (yellow card) 52'; Dănciulescu (yellow card) 23'	Attendance: 4,000; Referee: Sebastian Colţescu (Craiova)

13 August 3	Dinamo București	2–0	Pandurii Târgu Jiu	Stadionul Dinamo, București
19:00	Dănciulescu 48'; Niculae 71' (pen.); Moţi (yellow card) 27'; Niculae (yellow card) 36'; Bakaj (yellow card) 43'	Report		Attendance: 0 Referee: Adrian Ilyes (Ploieşti)

21 August 4	Sportul Studenţesc	0–2	Dinamo București	Stadionul Regie, București
18:00		Report	Dănciulescu 59'; Ganea 69'; Moţi (yellow card) 54'	Attendance: 4,000; Referee: Istvan Kovacs (Carei)

28 August 5	Dinamo București	2–1	Oţelul Galaţi	Stadionul Dinamo, București
20:00	Moţi 23'; Niculae 80'; Grigore (yellow card) 39'; Torje (yellow card) 62'; Patraşcu (yellow card) 72'	Report	Costin 73'	Attendance: 4,000; Referee: Cristian Balaj (Baia Mare)

11 September 6	FC Vaslui	3–1	Dinamo București	Stadionul Municipal, Vaslui
21:30	Temwanjera 42'; Wesley 44'; Sânmărtean 74'	Report	Stoica 41'; Munteanu (yellow card) 49'; Bălgrădean (yellow card) 62'; Ţucudean (yellow card) 86'	Attendance: 7,000; Referee: Robert Dumitru (Braşov)

18 September 7	Dinamo București	0–0	Rapid București	Stadionul Dinamo, București
21:30	Koné (yellow card) 31'; Grigore (yellow card) 58'; Niculae (yellow card) 75'; Bakaj (yellow card) 90'	Report	Herea (red card) 43'	Attendance: 5,000; Referee: Sebastian Colţescu (Craiova)

25 September 8	Petrolul Ploieşti	1–5	Dinamo București	Stadionul Ilie Oană, Ploieşti
21:30	Mitea 81'	Report	Moţi 10'; Koné 45'; Dănciulescu 80'; Niculae 83', 85'; Luchin (yellow card) 41'; Scarlatache (yellow card) 57'; Munteanu (yellow card) 58'	Attendance: 13,127; Referee: Istvan Kovacs (Carei)

1 October 9	Dinamo București	2–0	Concordia Chiajna	Stadionul Dinamo, București
21:30	Dănciulescu 39'; Bakaj 90+2'; Grigore (yellow card) 25'; Luchin (yellow card) 35'; Bakaj (yellow card) 78'	Report		Attendance: 0 Referee: Paul Unimatan (Zalău)

17 October 10	Ceahlăul Piatra Neamţ	0–5	Dinamo București	Stadionul Ceahlăul, Piatra Neamţ
20:00		Report	Niculae 4', 32', 80' (pen.); Alexe 38'; Dănciulescu 42'; Alexe (yellow card) 56'; Munteanu (yellow card) 66'; Koné (yellow card) 85'	Attendance: 5,000; Referee: Alexandru Tudor (București)

23 October 11	Dinamo București	0–0	FC Brașov	Stadionul Dinamo, București
21:30	Moţi (yellow card) 78'	Report		Attendance: 3,000; Referee: Cristian Balaj (Baia Mare)

29 October 12	Universitatea Cluj	0–0	Dinamo București	Cluj Arena, Cluj-Napoca
21:30		Report	Diabaté (yellow card) 61'; Alexe (yellow card) 62'; Păun (yellow card) 90'	Attendance: 18,000; Referee: Alexandru Deaconu (București)

5 November 13	CFR Cluj	2–3	Dinamo București	Stadionul Dr. Constantin Rădulescu, Cluj-Napoca
21:00	Cadú 38' (pen.); Ronny 46'	Report	Dănciulescu 21'; Niculae 82' (pen.), 90+3'; Luchin (yellow card) 33'; Rus (yellow card) 37'; Scarlatache (yellow card) 38'; Diabate (yellow card) 67'; Dănciulescu (yellow card) 87'; Bălgrădean (yellow card) 90+1'	Attendance: 12,648; Referee: Alexandru Tudor (București)

19 November 14	Dinamo București	1–0	Voinţa Sibiu	Stadionul Dinamo, București
18:00	Dănciulescu 76'; Grigore (yellow card) 56'; Moţi (yellow card) 69'; Munteanu (yellow card) 88'	Report		Attendance: 2,000; Referee: Adrian Cojocaru (Galaţi)

27 November 15	CS Mioveni	0–1	Dinamo București	Stadionul Dacia, Mioveni
20:30		Report	Rus 29'; Rus (yellow card) 50'	Attendance: 4,000; Referee: Marius Bocăneală (Galaţi)

5 December 16	Dinamo București	1–3	Steaua București	Stadionul Dinamo, București
20:30	Niculae 20' (pen.); Moţi (yellow card) 87'	Report	Rusescu 22', 59'; M.Costea 90+2'	Attendance: 15,000; Referee: Cristian Balaj (Baia Mare)

11 December 17	Astra Ploieşti	0–0	Dinamo București	Stadionul Astra, Ploieşti
20:30		Report	Pulhac (yellow card) 14'; Koné (yellow card) 62'; Diabate (yellow card) 90'	Attendance: 2,500; Referee: Ovidiu Haţegan (Arad)

17 December 18	FCM Târgu Mureș	0–1	Dinamo București	Stadionul Trans-Sil, Târgu Mureş
20:30		Report	Niculae 50' (pen.); Niculae (yellow card) 7'; Rus (yellow card) 36'; Moţi (yellow card) 43'; Ţucudean (yellow card) 90+3'; Diabate (yellow card) 90+5'	Attendance: 7,000; Referee: Alexandru Tudor (București)

3 March 19	Dinamo București	2–0	Gaz Metan Mediaş	Arena Națională, București
20:20	Munteanu 11' (pen.); Dănciulescu 28'	Report		Attendance: 24,000; Referee: Radu Petrescu (București)

10 March 20	Pandurii Târgu Jiu	2–2	Dinamo București	Stadionul Tudor Vladimirescu, Târgu Jiu
20:30	Viera 6'; Pintilii 82' (pen.)	Report	Dănciulescu 16'; Niculae 29'; Rus (yellow card) 23'; Munteanu (yellow card) 24'; Koné (yellow card) 57'; Matei (yellow card) 73' (yellow-red card) 90+2'	Attendance: 8,000; Referee: Ovidiu Haţegan (Arad)

17 March 21	Dinamo București	1–3	Sportul Studențesc	Stadionul Dinamo, București
21:30	Niculae 3'; Moţi (yellow card) 48'; Ţucudean (yellow card) 79'	Report	Nistor 15'; Ferfelea 32'; Lazăr 81'	Attendance: 5,000; Referee: Cristian Balaj (Baia Mare)

21 March 22	Oțelul Galați	1–1	Dinamo București	Stadionul Oțelul, Galați
21:30	Iorga 25'	Report	Niculae 27' (pen.); Grigore (yellow card) 11'; Pulhac (yellow card) 14'; Luchin (yellow card) 32'; Niculae (red card) 41'; Curtean (yellow card) 89'; Bălgrădean (yellow card) 90+4'	Attendance: 10,000; Referee: Istvan Kovacs (Carei)

25 March 23	Dinamo București	0–1	FC Vaslui	Stadionul Dinamo, București
21:30	Curtean (yellow card) 90+1'	Report	Bello 57'	Attendance: 5,000; Referee: Alexandru Tudor (București)

1 April 24	Rapid București	0–0	Dinamo București	Stadionul Giuleşti-Valentin Stănescu, București
21:00		Report	Luchin (yellow card) 37'; Pulhac (yellow card) 61'; Rus (yellow card) 71'	Attendance: 10,000; Referee: Ovidiu Haţegan (Arad)

7 April 25	Dinamo București	1–3	Petrolul Ploieşti	Stadionul Dinamo, București
19:00	Niculae 90+4'; Rus (yellow card) 55'; Koné (yellow card) 78'	Report	Younés 60'; Oprița 69'; Boudjemaa 90'	Attendance: 3,000; Referee: Paul Unimatan (Zalău)

16 April 26	Concordia Chiajna	1–3	Dinamo București	Stadionul Concordia, Chiajna
21:30	Iordache 90'	Report	Alexe 32', 55' (pen.); Petrović 90+2' (o.g.); Pulhac (yellow card) 36'; Moţi (yellow card) 39'; Grigore (yellow card) 90'	Attendance: 4,000; Referee: Marius Avram (București)

22 April 27	Dinamo București	3–2	Ceahlăul Piatra Neamț	Stadionul Dinamo, București
21:30	Alexe 49', 54'; Dănciulescu 62'; Luchin (yellow card) 3'; Moţi (yellow card) 48' (yellow-red card) 79'; Niculae (yellow card) 58'	Report	Bădescu 90'; Golubović 90+3'	Attendance: 3,000; Referee: Alexandru Tudor (București)

27 April 28	FC Brașov	2–0	Dinamo București	Stadionul Silviu Ploeşteanu, Brașov
20:20	Distéfano 29'; Ilijoski 78'	Report	Dănciulescu (yellow card) 3'; Scarlatache (yellow card) 23'; Pulhac (yellow card) 80'; Luchin (yellow card) 84'; Platini (yellow card) 86'; Koné (yellow card) 90'	Referee: Sebastian Colţescu (Craiova)

2 May 29	Dinamo București	2–2	Universitatea Cluj	Stadionul Dinamo, București
21:45	Curtean 26'; Matei 85'; Scarlatache (yellow card) 25'; Moţi (yellow card) 68'; Rus (yellow card) 78'; Niculae (yellow card) 82'	Report	Morar 62'; Cristea 90'	Attendance: 1,500; Referee: Richard Trutz (Slovakia)

5 May 30	Dinamo București	0–1	CFR Cluj	Stadionul Dinamo, București
21:45	Muşat (yellow card) 25'; Koné (yellow card) 41'; Ţucudean (yellow card) 51'; Grigore (yellow card) 59'; Niculae (yellow card) 83'	Report	Kapetanos 90'	Attendance: 3,000; Referee: Anastasios Kakos (Greece)

8 May 31	Voința Sibiu	0–1	Dinamo București	Stadionul Municipal, Sibiu
18:00		Report	Niculae 25' (pen.); Grigore (yellow card) 29'; Rus (yellow card) 64'; Scarlatache (yellow card) 84'	Attendance: 7,000; Referee: Cristian Balaj (Baia Mare)

12 May 32	Dinamo București	4–1	CS Mioveni	Stadionul Dinamo, București
21:30	Matei 43'; Tameş 45'; Stănescu 58'; Dănciulescu 65'; Nica (yellow card) 6'	Report	Coșereanu 60'	Attendance: 1,500; Referee: Iulian Dima (București)

17 May 33	Steaua București	3–2	Dinamo București	Arena Națională, București
21:45	Rusescu 43' (pen.); Iliev 48', 64'	Report	Curtean 21'; Ţucudean 86'; Curtean (yellow card) 34'; Ţucudean (yellow card) 90+3'	Attendance: 47,698; Referee: Olegário Benquerença (Portugal)

20 May 34	Dinamo București	3–0	Astra Ploiești	Stadionul Dinamo, București
17:00	Grigore 7'; Dănciulescu 27' (pen.); Ţucudean 79'; Dănciulescu (yellow card) 33'	Report		Attendance: 1,000; Referee: Horaţiu Feşnic (Cluj-Napoca)

==== UEFA Europa League ====
28 July 3Q, 1L	Dinamo București (Romania)	2–2	(Croatia) Varaždin	Stadionul Dinamo, București
21:00	Sušac 6' (o.g.); Moţi 16'; Scarlatache (yellow card) 47'; Păun (yellow card) 90+2'	Report	Sačer 43'; Vugrinec 45+2'	Attendance: 4,000; Referee: Leontios Trattou (Cyprus)

4 August 3Q, 2L	Varaždin (Croatia)	1–2	(Romania) Dinamo București	Stadion Varteks, Varaždin
18:00	Golubar 14'	Report	Dănciulescu 7'; Munteanu 26'; Alexe (yellow card) 13'; Niculae (yellow card) 49'; Munteanu (yellow card) 53'; Torje (yellow card) 72'; Ţucudean (yellow card) 90'	Attendance: 3,000; Referee: Ján Valášek (Slovakia)

18 August PO, 1L	Vorskla Poltava (Ukraine)	2–1	(Romania) Dinamo București	Butovsky Vorskla Stadium, Poltava
20:00	Kryvoshyenko 32'; Rebenok 89'	Report	Niculae 58'; Grigore (yellow card) 24' (yellow-red card) 64'; Niculae (yellow card) 70'; Alexe (yellow card) 80'	Referee: Liran Liany (Israel)

25 August PO, 2L	Dinamo București (Romania)	2–3	(Ukraine) Vorskla Poltava	Stadionul Dinamo, București
18:00	Torje 45'; Ţucudean 90'; Rus (yellow card) 64'; Diabaté (yellow card) 89'	Report	Januzi 37'; Barannik 72', 78'	Attendance: 9,641; Referee: Cyril Zimmermann (Switzerland)

==== Cupa României ====
22 September R32	Dinamo București	1–0	Luceafărul Oradea	Stadionul Dinamo, București
21:15	Luchin 32'; Luchin (yellow card) 34'	Report		Attendance: 0 Referee: Georgian Ionescu (Buzău)

26 October R16	Dinamo București	5–0	Gaz Metan Severin	Stadionul Dinamo, București
21:30	Ganea 37', 60'; Luchin 42'; Ţucudean 74'; Păun 84'	Report		Attendance: 1,000; Referee: Paul Unimatan (Zalău)

8 December QF	Dinamo București	2–1	Petrolul Ploiești	Stadionul Dinamo, București
20:30	Dănciulescu 14'; Ganea 56'; Dănciulescu (yellow card) 18'; Niculae (yellow card) 33'; Moţi (yellow card) 60'; Bălgrădean (yellow card) 90+3'	Report	Borza 48' (pen.); Negru (red card) 90+2'	Attendance: 2,000; Referee: Alexandru Deaconu (București)

29 March SF 1L	Dinamo București	1–0	Gaz Metan Mediaș	Stadionul Dinamo, București
20:00	Rus 88'; Moți (red card) 39'; Grigore (yellow card) 59'	Report		Attendance: 2,500; Referee: Radu Petrescu (București)

12 April SF 2L	Gaz Metan Mediaș	2–1	Dinamo București	Stadionul Gaz Metan, Mediaș
21:30	Marković 8'; Ba 80'	Report	Stoica 58'; Koné (yellow card) 45'; Moți (yellow card) 72'	Attendance: 6,000; Referee: Radu Petrescu (București)

Dinamo București won on aggregate due to away goal

23 May Final	Rapid București	0–1	Dinamo București	Arena Națională, București
21:00		Report	Scarlatache 58'; Niculae (yellow card) 68'; Naumovski (yellow card) 90+6'	Attendance: 40,000; Referee: Daniele Orsato (Italy)

=== Non competitive matches ===
==== Friendly ====
27 June 2011 Friendly	Dinamo București (Romania)	4–0	(Kosovo) Trepça
17:30 EET	Grigore 11', 36'; Dănciulescu 30'; Bakaj 50'	Report

29 June 2011 Friendly	Dinamo București (Romania)	0–1	(Germany) FC Ingolstadt 04
21:45 EET		Report	Biliškov 42'

2 July 2011 Friendly	Dinamo București (Romania)	2–1	(Switzerland) Basel
17:30 EET	Dănciulescu 6'; Ţucudean 89'	Report	Frei 66'	Attendance: 200; Referee: Michael Schiffmann

4 July 2011 Friendly	Dinamo București (Romania)	2–1	(Israel) Maccabi Haifa
17:30 EET	Crişan 75'; Ganea 77'	Report	Dvalishvili 14'

6 July 2011 Friendly	Dinamo București (Romania)	1–1	United Arab Emirates
17:30 EET	Ţucudean 69'	Report	Khalil 40'

8 July 2011 Friendly	Dinamo București (Romania)	2–1	(Austria) USK Anif
17:30 EET	Stănescu 57'; Chiacu 78'		Scherz 81' (pen.)

9 July 2011 Friendly	Dinamo București (Romania)	17–0	(Austria) Kössen
16:15 EET	Ganea x2 Torje x3 Moţi; Dănciulescu; Alexe; Munteanu; Bakaj x2 Niculae x2 Koné; Ţucudean x2 Pătraşcu

8 October 2011 Friendly	Ludogorets Razgrad (Bulgaria)	2–1	(Romania) Dinamo București	Razgrad, Bulgaria
16:00 EET	Marcelo 48'; Kabasele 90+2'	Report	Scherz 81' (pen.)	Stadium: Ludogorets Arena

12 November 2011 Friendly	Dacia Chișinău (Moldova)	2–1	(Romania) Dinamo București	Chișinău, Moldova
17:45 EET	Dedov 22'; Orbu 90+1' (pen.)	Report	Stănescu 90+3'	Stadium: Zimbru Stadium

25 January 2012 Friendly	Dinamo București (Romania)	0–1	(Kazakhstan) Taraz
19:00 EET		Report	Lečić 68'

28 January 2012 Friendly	Dinamo București (Romania)	1–1	(Austria) Ried
18:00 EET	Țucudean 22'	Report	Beichler 19'

31 January 2012 Friendly	Dinamo București (Romania)	0–2	(Ukraine) Karpaty Lviv
15:15 EET		Report	Lucas 68', 81'

6 February 2012 Taurus Cup – Semifinal	Dinamo București (Romania)	4–0	(Moldova) Zimbru Chișinău
18:00 EET	Luchin 6'; Alexe 24'; Niculae 68'; Țucudean 88' (pen.)	Report

8 February 2012 Taurus Cup – Final	Dinamo București (Romania)	2–1	(Bulgaria) CSKA Sofia
17:00 EET	Rus 8'; Alexe 68'	Report	Moraes 30' (pen.)

10 February 2012 Friendly	Dinamo București (Romania)	1–1	(Bulgaria) Ludogorets Razgrad
18:00 EET	Curtean 9'	Report	Dyakov 39' (pen.)

11 February 2012 Friendly	Dinamo București (Romania)	3–1	(Romania) Viitorul Constanța
16:00 EET	Niculae 38'; Dănciulescu 51'; Moți 56'	Report	Dică 23'

12 February 2012 Friendly	Dinamo București (Romania)	0–0	(Hungary) Videoton
20:00 EET		Report

19 February 2012 Friendly	Dinamo București (Romania)	2–1	(Saudi Arabia) Najran
19:30 EET	Niculae 4'; Țucudean 71'	Report	Al Hussain 43' (pen.)

23 February 2012 Friendly	Dinamo București (Romania)	0–0	(Kazakhstan) Ordabasy
18:00 EET		Report

Last updated: 23 February 2012.
Source: www.fcdinamo.ro
