= List of Romanian football transfers winter 2011–12 =

This is a list of Romanian football transfers for the winter 2011–12 transfer window. Only moves featuring at least one Liga I club are listed.

== Transfers ==
Date	Name	Country	From/Last Club	Moving to	Fee
1 January 2012	Alexandru Chipciu	Romania	FC Brașov	Steaua	Undisclosed
4 January 2012	Paul Pârvulescu	Romania	Gaz Metan	Steaua	Undisclosed
5 January 2012	Ovidiu Dănănae	Romania	Tom Tomsk (Russia)	Steaua	Free
5 January 2012	Daniel Fernandes	Portugal	CFR Cluj	Free agent	Released
6 January 2012	Sorin Strătilă	Romania	Astra Ploiești	Dinamo	Undisclosed
7 January 2012	Ionuţ Rada	Romania	CFR Cluj	Karlsruher SC (Germany)	Loan
10 January 2012	Alexandru Curtean	Romania	FC Timișoara	Dinamo	Undisclosed
11 January 2012	Diogo Silva	Portugal	Santa Clara (Portugal)	FC Brașov	Undisclosed
12 January 2012	George Galamaz	Romania	Steaua	U Cluj	Undisclosed
12 January 2012	Mircea Bornescu	Romania	Petrolul	U Cluj	Undisclosed
12 January 2012	Dorinel Popa	Romania	Steaua	U Cluj	Undisclosed
12 January 2012	Romulus Miclea	Romania	Gaz Metan	Voința Sibiu	Loan
13 January 2012	Zié Diabaté	Ivory Coast	Dinamo	Dijon (France)	Undisclosed
13 January 2012	Cosmin Năstăsie	Romania	FC Argeş	CS Mioveni	Undisclosed
14 January 2012	Baže Ilijoski	North Macedonia	Skopje (North Macedonia)	FC Brașov	Undisclosed
14 January 2012	Davide Dias	Portugal	Apollon (Cyprus)	FC Brașov	Undisclosed
15 January 2012	Marius Postolache	Romania	Delta Tulcea	Voința Sibiu	Free
18 January 2012	Didi Silva	Brazil	FCM Târgu Mureș	Oțelul	€50,000
18 January 2012	Shikoze Udoji	Bulgaria	Astra	FC Brașov	Undisclosed
18 January 2012	Mauro Alonso	Brazil	FK Ekranas (Lithuania)	FC Brașov	Undisclosed
18 January 2012	Marian Cristescu	Romania	FC Brașov	U Cluj	Undisclosed
18 January 2012	Ovidiu Hoban	Romania	Gaz Metan	U Cluj	Undisclosed
18 January 2012	Aleksandar Petrović	Serbia	Petrolul	Concordia	Undisclosed
19 January 2012	Adrian Voiculeț	Romania	FC Brașov	CS Mioveni	Undisclosed
20 January 2012	Savio Nsereko	Germany	Fiorentina (Italy)	FC Vaslui	Undisclosed
20 January 2012	Jaime Bragança	Portugal	Persija Jakarta (Indonesia)	FC Vaslui	Undisclosed
24 January 2012	Jaka Stromajer	Slovenia	Pandurii	Oțelul	Undisclosed
24 January 2012	Diego Ruiz	Argentina	FCM Târgu Mureș	Antofagasta (Chile)	Undisclosed
26 January 2012	Iulian Tameş	Romania	FC Timișoara	Dinamo	Undisclosed
27 January 2012	Juliano Spadacio	Brazil	PAOK (Greece)	Astra	Undisclosed
27 January 2012	Lucian Goian	Romania	Astra	Tianjin Teda (China)	Undisclosed
27 January 2012	Giani Kiriţă	Romania	Bursaspor (Turkey)	FCM Târgu Mureș	Undisclosed
27 January 2012	Nicolas Godemèche	France	Naval 1º Maio (Portugal)	CFR Cluj	Undisclosed
27 January 2012	Cássio Vargas	Brazil	Rapid	Beira-Mar (Portugal)	Loan
28 January 2012	Cosmin Vâtcă	Romania	Gaz Metan	Rapid	Free
30 January 2012	Renan Garcia	Brazil	CFR Cluj	Sampdoria (Italy)	Loan
31 January 2012	Laionel	Brazil	Gil Vicente (Portugal)	Astra	Free
31 January 2012	Daniel Novac	Romania	Oțelul	Sportul Studențesc	Free
31 January 2012	Nicolae Zuluf	Romania	Dinamo	CS Mioveni	Loan
31 January 2012	Sorin Ispir	Romania	Dinamo	CS Mioveni	Loan
1 February 2012	Mihai Dina	Romania	CS Mioveni	Petrolul	Free
3 February 2012	Bogdan Ungurușan	Romania	U Cluj	Pandurii	Undisclosed
4 February 2012	Stojan Vranješ	Bosnia and Herzegovina	Pandurii	CFR Cluj	Loan
5 February 2012	Ricardo Nascimento	Brazil	Portimonense (Portugal)	Astra	Free
9 February 2012	Rui Miguel	Portugal	FC Krasnodar (Russia)	Astra	Free
14 February 2012	Michel Platini	Brazil	CSKA Sofia (Bulgaria)	Dinamo	Undisclosed
20 February 2012	Aymen Tahar	Algeria	Sheffield United (England)	Gaz Metan Mediaș	Free
20 February 2012	Álvaro Silva	Spain	Xerez (Spain)	Petrolul	Loan
21 February 2012	Liviu Ganea	Romania	Dinamo	CFR Cluj	Undisclosed
21 February 2012	László Sepsi	Romania	Poli Timișoara	FCM Târgu Mureș	Free
21 February 2012	Goran Ljubojević	Croatia	NK Osijek (Croatia)	FCM Târgu Mureș	Undisclosed
21 February 2012	Elias Bazzi	Argentina	U Cluj	FC Argeş	Undisclosed
22 February 2012	Bogdan Pătrașcu	Romania	Dinamo	Astra	Undisclosed
22 February 2012	William Dos Santos	Brazil	Vitória de Guimarães (Portugal)	Astra	Undisclosed
23 February 2012	Weldon Santos	Brazil	CFR Cluj	Changchun Yatai (China)	Undisclosed
26 February 2012	Georgian Păun	Romania	Dinamo	CSKA Sofia (Bulgaria)	Loan
28 February 2012	Elis Bakaj	Albania	Dinamo	Chornomorets Odesa (Ukraine)	Loan
29 February 2012	John Ibeh	Nigeria	Oțelul	Pandurii	Undisclosed
29 February 2012	Dănuț Enescu	Romania	Petrolul	Oțelul	Free
1 March 2012	Pablo Brandán	Argentina	Steaua	Liaoning Whowin (China)	$700,000
13 March 2012	Monsef Zerka	Morocco	New England Revolution	Petrolul	Free
14 March 2012	Juan Sotelo	Argentina	La Serena	Rapid	Free
16 March 2012	Vasile Olariu	Romania	Victoria Brăneşti	FC Brașov	Undisclosed
