= Gabriel Torje =

Romanian footballer

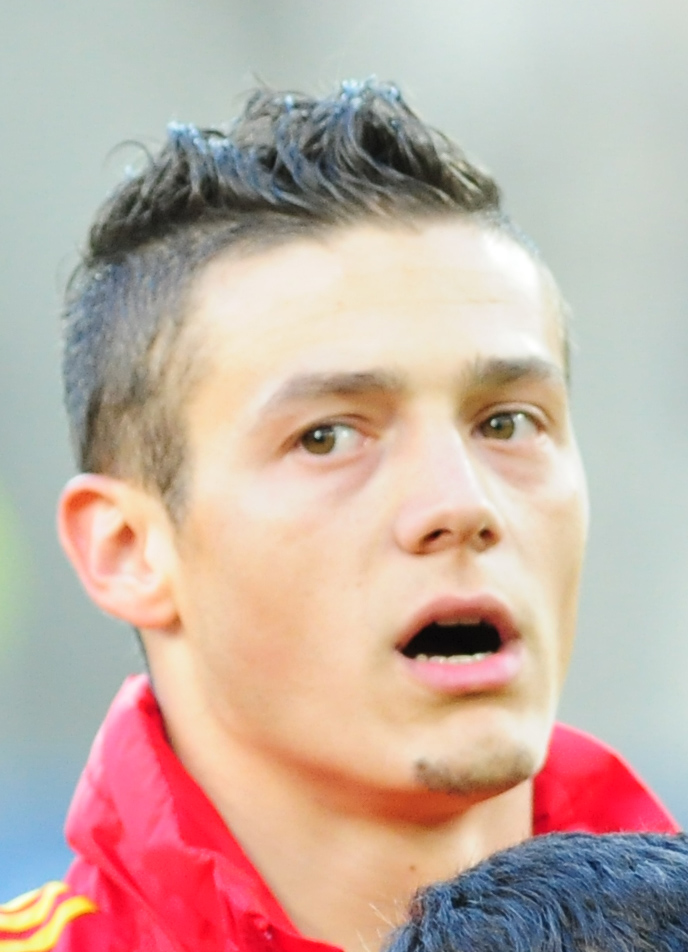
- Torje with Romania in 2012

Personal information
- Full name: Andrei Gabriel Torje
- Date of birth: 22 November 1989 (age 36)
- Place of birth: Timișoara, Romania
- Height: 1.67 m (5 ft 6 in)
- Position: Winger

Team information
- Current team: CSM Oltenița (sporting director)

Youth career
- 1999–2005: Srbianka Giuchici Timișoara
- 2005: Politehnica Timișoara

Senior career*
Years	Team	Apps	(Gls)
2004–2005	Furnirul Deta		
2005–2008	Politehnica Timișoara	37	(2)
2005	→ CFR Timișoara (loan)	8	(1)
2008–2011	Dinamo București	108	(17)
2011–2016	Udinese	21	(2)
2012–2013	→ Granada (loan)	34	(3)
2013–2014	→ Espanyol (loan)	12	(0)
2014–2015	→ Konyaspor (loan)	27	(5)
2015–2016	→ Osmanlıspor (loan)	25	(3)
2016–2018	Terek Grozny	10	(0)
2017	→ Karabükspor (loan)	15	(3)
2018	→ Dinamo București (loan)	7	(2)
2018–2019	Sivasspor	19	(0)
2020–2021	AEL	18	(2)
2021	Bandırmaspor	8	(1)
2021–2022	Dinamo București	23	(6)
2022–2023	Farul Constanța	16	(3)
2023	Gençlerbirliği	9	(2)
2023–2024	Concordia Chiajna	13	(1)
2024–2025	AFC Câmpulung Muscel	8	(1)
Total		418	(54)

International career
2006	Romania U17	5	(0)
2006–2010	Romania U21	24	(9)
2010–2017	Romania	57	(12)

Managerial career
- 2026–: CSM Oltenița (sporting director)
- * Club domestic league appearances and goals

Andrei Gabriel Torje (Romanian pronunciation: [ɡabriˈel anˈdrej ˈtorʒe]; born 22 November 1989) is a Romanian former professional footballer who played as a winger, who is currently a television sport pundit for Digi Sport and sporting director at Liga IV club CSM Oltenița.

Torje was named Romanian Footballer of the Year in 2011.

== Club career ==
=== Early career ===
Torje was born on 22 November 1989 in Timișoara, Romania and began playing football at Miroslav Giuchici's youth club Srbianka. He started playing senior-level football around the age of 15, when Srbianka sent him to Furnirul Deta in the fourth league. He joined CFR Timișoara, where he played during the 2005–06 Divizia B season.

=== Politehnica Timișoara ===
Torje's talent was noticed by Politehnica Timișoara's coach Gheorghe Hagi, who brought him to the first team. Hagi gave Torje his Divizia A debut on 28 April 2006 by sending him in the 75th minute to replace Marian Constantinescu in a 0–0 draw against Argeș Pitești. In his following match in the competition, Torje scored his first goal in a 4–2 loss to Farul Constanța. He helped the team reach the 2007 Cupa României final, where coach Valentin Velcea used him the entire match in the 2–0 loss to Rapid București.

=== Dinamo București ===
On 15 January 2008, Torje signed a five-year contract with Dinamo București, which paid a transfer fee of €2 million to Politehnica. On 1 November 2008, he provided an assist to Adrian Cristea's header that closed the scoring for a 1–1 draw against rivals Steaua București. Torje helped the club achieve what was dubbed "The wonder from Liberec" by winning the away game 3–0 against Slovan Liberec to force a penalty shoot-out after losing the first leg by the same score, ultimately qualifying for the 2009–10 Europa League group stage. He scored a career-best nine league goals in the 2010–11 season, including the winning goal in a 3–2 derby victory against Rapid București and the only goal in a 1–0 win over Steaua. The team reached the 2011 Cupa României final, where Torje played the entire match under coach Ioan Andone and scored once in the 2–1 loss to Steaua.

=== Udinese ===
On 30 August 2011, Torje left Dinamo and signed a five-year contract with Serie A club Udinese for an undisclosed fee, rumored to be around €4 million but capable of reaching €7 million depending on performance bonuses. He played his first Serie A game as a starter under coach Francesco Guidolin against Lecce on 11 September, providing an assist to Antonio Di Natale for a 2–0 win, even though he had only five days of training with his new team. Torje had an impressive performance, suggesting that Alexis Sánchez might not be as irreplaceable as first thought. For the way he played in 2011, Torje won the Romanian Footballer of the Year award. On 5 February 2012, Torje scored his first league goal in a 3–2 loss to Fiorentina. On 24 March, in a game against Palermo he equalized the score in the 85th minute, giving his team a 1–1 draw.

==== Loan to Granada ====
In order to get more playing time, on 8 June 2012, Torje signed for La Liga side Granada on a season-long loan. He made his debut for the Spanish team on 20 August, as coach Juan Antonio Anquela sent him in the 78th minute to substitute Fabián Orellana in a 1–0 away defeat to Rayo Vallecano. On 30 September, he scored his first goal in the competition and also earned a penalty from which Guilherme Siqueira scored for a 2–1 win against Celta Vigo. He scored two more goals by the end of 2012 in victories against Mallorca and Real Betis. Halfway through the season Torje was considered one of the most successful transfers in the 2012–13 La Liga, and he became a crucial part of the team. He was praised for his performance in the 1–0 victory over La Liga title holders, Real Madrid, on 2 February 2013.

==== Loan to Espanyol ====
On 2 September 2013, Torje began his second journey in La Liga, this time being loaned to the second major club in Barcelona, RCD Espanyol. He made his debut for the club on 23 September, when coach Ernesto Valverde sent him in the 74th minute to replace Simão Sabrosa in a 3–2 win over Athletic Bilbao. He played only 12 league games for Espanyol without scoring a goal. Thus, the Spanish side did not activate the option to buy the player at the end of the loan spell.

==== Loan to Konyaspor ====
In June 2014, Turkish side Konyaspor announced that they reached an agreement with Udinese to loan Torje for one season. There, he became teammates with compatriot Ciprian Marica. Torje made his Süper Lig debut under coach Mesut Bakkal on 30 August and scored once in a 2–1 away loss to Eskişehirspor. In the following match, he scored the first-ever goal at Konyaspor's new stadium with a spectacular scissors kick to help the club earn a 2–0 victory against Balıkesirspor. In May 2015, he scored two goals in two 1–0 wins over Gençlerbirliği and Beşiktaş, with the goal against the latter being directly from a corner kick, a result that mathematically eliminated Beşiktaş from the title race.

==== Loan to Osmanlispor ====
Torje was loaned out by Udinese for the 2015–16 season to Osmanlıspor, where he became a teammate of fellow Romanian Raul Rusescu. In his second match for his new team, he scored the winning goal in a 2–1 away victory against Galatasaray. On 26 September 2015, he scored a goal from a free kick and provided two assists in a 3–1 success over Trabzonspor.

=== Terek Grozny ===
In July 2016, Torje signed with Terek Grozny and became teammates with compatriot Gheorghe Grozav. He made his Russian Premier League debut on 31 July, as coach Rashid Rakhimov sent him in the 66th minute to substitute Pedro Ken in a 1–0 home win over Krylia Sovetov. His spell at Terek was unsuccessful, as he did not adapt, making only 10 goalless league appearances during the 2016–17 season.

==== Loan to Karabükspor ====
In July 2017, Torje was loaned by Terek to Karabükspor for a €200,000 fee. He had several compatriots as teammates, including Paul Papp, Gheorghe Grozav, Iasmin Latovlevici, Valerică Găman and Cristian Tănase. Torje netted his first goal from a free kick in a 3–1 win over İstanbul Başakşehir. Subsequently, Torje scored once again from a free kick in a loss to Yeni Malatyaspor, after which he netted the only goal of a 1–0 win over Kayserispor.

==== Loan to Dinamo București ====
On 2 February 2018, he rejoined Dinamo București on loan from Terek until the end of the 2017–18 season. He scored in his first match to help the team earn a 4–3 win over Concordia Chiajna. In his following match, he scored in a 2–2 derby draw against FCSB. In late April 2018, he was removed from the squad by coach Florin Bratu following a disagreement.

=== Sivasspor ===
After ending his contract with Terek, Torje returned to Turkey, signing with Sivasspor on 1 September 2018. There, he became teammates with compatriot Paul Papp and Brazilian star Robinho. Torje made his last Süper Lig appearance on 24 May 2019 in a 4–3 victory against Galatasaray, totaling 86 matches with 11 goals in the competition.

=== AEL and Bandırmaspor ===
On 4 February 2020, he signed a contract with Super League club AEL, where he became a teammate of fellow Romanian Steliano Filip. Torje made his Super League Greece debut on 8 February, as coach Michalis Grigoriou sent him in the 62nd minute to replace Vinícius in a 0–0 draw against Lamia. On 22 June, he scored a brace in a 3–1 home win against Volos in the 2019–20 Super League play-offs.

After leaving AEL at the end of 2020, Torje moved to Turkish TFF First League club Bandırmaspor in January 2021.

=== Dinamo București and Farul Constanța ===
In September 2021, Torje went for a third spell at Dinamo București. In his first match, the team suffered a 6–0 defeat in a derby against FCSB. His stint was unsuccessful because he could not help the team avoid relegation at the end of the 2021–22 season.

On 3 June 2022, Torje joined Farul Constanța on a two-year deal. In the first half of the 2022–23 season, he made 16 league appearances and scored three goals under coach Gheorghe Hagi. On 29 December 2022, Torje was released from the club after having his contract mutually terminated, but Farul still managed to win the title without him. He accumulated a total of 191 games and 30 goals in the Romanian top division, Liga I.

=== Late career ===
On 6 January 2023, Torje joined Turkish TFF First League club Gençlerbirliği. He left the team in the summer of 2023, signing in September with Liga II side Concordia Chiajna. In June 2024, Torje left Chiajna and in October joined fellow second-tier club AFC Câmpulung Muscel, where he ended his career in January 2025.

== International career ==
Torje (number 11) in action during a 2012 friendly against Austria

From 2006 to 2010, Torje was consistently featured for Romania's under-17 and under-21 sides. Notably, with the latter, he finished first in the group for the 2011 European Under-21 Championship qualifiers before reaching a play-off, where he captained the team in the 2–1 aggregate loss to England U21, who advanced to the final tournament.

Torje played 56 matches and scored 11 goals for Romania, making his debut on 3 September 2010 under coach Răzvan Lucescu in a 1–1 draw against Albania in the Euro 2012 qualifiers. During those qualifiers, he played a total of eight matches and scored a brace in a 2–0 away win over Luxembourg. Before the goals against Luxembourg, Torje scored his first international goal in a 1–1 friendly draw against Cyprus. He played in all 10 matches during the 2014 World Cup qualifiers, scoring three goals that helped Romania earn two victories against Andorra and one against Estonia. Subsequently, the team reached the play-off, where he played in both legs of the 4–2 aggregate loss to Greece, who advanced to the final tournament.

Torje then played nine games without scoring in the successful Euro 2016 qualifiers. He was selected by coach Anghel Iordănescu to be part of Romania's squad for the final tournament. There, he played in all three games in the eventual group stage exit. In the first game, which was the tournament's first match, a 2–1 loss to hosts France, he came as a substitute and replaced Adrian Popa in the 82nd minute. In the second, he played the entire match in the 1–1 draw against Switzerland, and in the third, he entered the field in the 56th minute to replace Denis Alibec in the 1–0 loss to Albania.

Torje played in a 1–1 draw against Montenegro in the 2018 World Cup qualifiers. He made his last appearance for the national team on 14 November 2017 in a 3–0 friendly loss to the Netherlands.

== After retirement ==
In 2026, Torje and Alin Alexuc-Ciurariu won season 9 of Asia Express, a reality TV show that originally airs in Romania, which was held in Uzbekistan and China.

== Career statistics ==
=== Club ===
Appearances and goals by club, season and competition
Club	Season	League			National cup (Note: Includes Cupa României, Coppa Italia, Copa del Rey, Turkish Cup, Russian Cup)		Europe		Other		Total	
Club	Season	Division	Apps	Goals	Apps	Goals	Apps	Goals	Apps	Goals	Apps	Goals
CFR Timișoara (loan)	2005–06	Divizia B	8	1	1	0	—		—		9	1
Politehnica Timișoara	2005–06	Divizia A	5	1	—		—		—		5	1
Politehnica Timișoara	2006–07	Liga I	15	0	3	0	—		—		18	0
Politehnica Timișoara	2007–08	Liga I	17	1	1	0	—		—		18	1
Politehnica Timișoara	Total		37	2	4	0	–		—		41	2
Dinamo București	2007–08	Liga I	15	1	1	0	—		—		16	1
Dinamo București	2008–09	Liga I	30	3	3	0	2 (Note: Appearances in UEFA Cup)	0	—		35	3
Dinamo București	2009–10	Liga I	29	3	3	0	8 (Note: Appearances in UEFA Europa League)	0	—		40	3
Dinamo București	2010–11	Liga I	29	9	4	1	4	1	—		37	11
Dinamo București	2011–12	Liga I	5	1	—		4	1	—		14	3
Dinamo București	Total		108	17	11	1	18	2	—		137	20
Udinese	2011–12	Serie A	21	2	1	0	0	0	—		22	2
Granada (loan)	2012–13	La Liga	34	3	1	0	—		—		35	3
Espanyol (loan)	2013–14	La Liga	12	0	3	0	—		—		15	0
Konyaspor (loan)	2014–15	Süper Lig	27	5	9	1	—		—		36	6
Osmanlıspor (loan)	2015–16	Süper Lig	25	3	1	0	—		—		26	3
Terek Grozny	2016–17	Russian Premier League	10	0	1	0	—		—		11	0
Karabükspor (loan)	2017–18	Süper Lig	15	3	3	1	—		—		18	4
Dinamo București (loan)	2017–18	Liga I	7	2	1	0	—		—		8	2
Sivasspor	2018–19	Süper Lig	19	0	1	0	—		—		20	0
AEL	2019–20	Super League Greece	10	2	–		–		—		10	2
AEL	2020–21	Super League Greece	8	0	—		—		—		8	0
AEL	Total		18	2	—		—		—		18	2
Bandırmaspor	2020–21	TFF 1. Lig	8	1	—		—		—		8	1
Dinamo București	2021–22	Liga I	23	6	1	0	—		2 (Note: Appearances in Liga I promotion/relegation play-offs)	0	26	6
Farul Constanța	2022–23	Liga I	16	3	1	2	—		—		17	5
Gençlerbirliği	2022–23	TFF 1. Lig	9	2	—		—		—		9	2
Concordia Chiajna	2023–24	Liga II	13	1	—		—		—		13	1
AFC Câmpulung Muscel	2024–25	Liga II	8	1	—		—		—		8	1
Career total			418	54	39	5	18	2	2	0	477	61

=== International ===
Appearances and goals by national team and year
National team	Year	Apps	Goals
Romania
Romania	2010	3	0
Romania	2011	12	4
Romania	2012	9	4
Romania	2013	11	2
Romania	2014	4	0
Romania	2015	7	0
Romania	2016	9	2
Romania	2017	2	0
Total		57	12

Scores and results list Romania's goal tally first, score column indicates score after each Torje goal.

List of international goals scored by Gabriel Torje
No.	Date	Venue	Opponent	Score	Result	Competition
1	9 February 2011	Paralimni Stadium, Paralimni, Cyprus	Cyprus	1–0	1–1	Friendly
2	2 September 2011	Stade Josy Barthel, Luxembourg, Luxembourg	Luxembourg	1–0	2–0	UEFA Euro 2012 qualifying
3	2 September 2011	Stade Josy Barthel, Luxembourg, Luxembourg	Luxembourg	2–0	2–0	UEFA Euro 2012 qualifying
4	15 November 2011	Stadion Schnabelholz, Altach, Austria	Greece	1–0	3–1	Friendly
5	15 August 2012	Stadion Stožice, Ljubljana, Slovenia	Slovenia	2–3	3–4	Friendly
6	7 September 2012	A. Le Coq Arena, Tallinn, Estonia	Estonia	1–0	2–0	2014 FIFA World Cup qualification
*	14 November 2012	Arena Națională, Bucharest, Romania	Belgium	1–2	1–2	Friendly
7	11 September 2012	Arena Națională, Bucharest, Romania	Andorra	1–0	4–0	2014 FIFA World Cup qualification
8	6 February 2013	Estadio Ciudad de Málaga, Málaga, Spain	Australia	3–2	3–2	Friendly
9	11 October 2013	Estadi Comunal d'Andorra la Vella, Andorra la Vella, Andorra	Andorra	3–0	4–0	2014 FIFA World Cup qualification
10	29 May 2016	Stadio Olimpico Grande Torino, Turin, Italy	Ukraine	1–0	3–4	Friendly
11	3 June 2016	Arena Națională, Bucharest, Romania	Georgia	4–1	5–1	Friendly

* Unofficial match according to the Laws of the Game (excessive number of Romanian substitutions)

== Honours ==
Politehnica Timișoara

- Cupa României runner-up: 2006–07

Dinamo București

- Cupa României runner-up: 2010–11

Farul Constanța

- Liga I: 2022–23

Individual

- Gazeta Sporturilor Romanian Footballer of the Year: 2011
