= Raphael Stănescu =

Romanian footballer (born 1993)

Personal information
- Full name: Raphael Andrei Stănescu
- Date of birth: 27 June 1993 (age 33)
- Place of birth: Ühlingen-Birkendorf, Germany
- Height: 1.79 m (5 ft 10 in)
- Position: Midfielder

Team information
- Current team: Minaur Baia Mare
- Number: 11

Youth career
- 2000–2009: Dinamo București

Senior career*
| Years | Team | Apps | (Gls) |
| 2010–2013 | Dinamo II București | 50 | (10) |
| 2010–2014 | Dinamo București | 6 | (1) |
| 2013–2014 | → Corona Brașov (loan) | 17 | (1) |
| 2015–2016 | Oțelul Galați | 14 | (0) |
| 2016 | → Sporting Turnu Măgurele (loan) | | |
| 2016–2017 | Voluntari II | 26 | (9) |
| 2017–2018 | Farul Constanța | 25 | (19) |
| 2018–2019 | Daco-Getica București | 38 | (6) |
| 2019 | CSM Reșița | 3 | (0) |
| 2020 | Axiopolis Cernavodă | 4 | (5) |
| 2021 | Dacia Unirea Brăila | 28 | (13) |
| 2022–2023 | Minaur Baia Mare | 19 | (0) |
| 2023 | CSM Slatina | 1 | (0) |
| 2024– | Minaur Baia Mare | 12 | (5) |

International career
| 2009–2011 | Romania U17 | 7 | (4) |
| 2011–2012 | Romania U19 | 5 | (1) |
- * Club domestic league appearances and goals as of 08:08, 30 October 2024 (UTC)

Raphael Andrei Stănescu (born 27 June 1993) is a Romanian professional footballer who plays as a midfielder for Liga III club Minaur Baia Mare.

== Career ==
Stănescu made his Dinamo first-team debut on 22 May 2010, coming off the bench in a match against SC Vaslui as a substitute for Andrei Cristea. His first goal for Dinamo came in a game against CS Mioveni, on 12 May 2012. In 2014, he ended his contract with Dinamo, because he didn't have too many chances to play for the Reds-and-Whites.

In February 2022, he was suspended and fined by the Romanian Football Federation for his involvement in match fixing during his stint at Daco-Getica București – more specifically a game against UTA Arad on 28 September 2019. Stănescu filed a protest against the decision to suspend him.

== Honours ==
Dinamo București

- Cupa României: 2011–12
- Supercupa României: 2012

Farul Constanța

- Liga III: 2017–18

Minaur Baia Mare

- Liga III: 2021–22
