= Zié Diabaté =

Ivorian footballer

Personal information
- Date of birth: 2 March 1989 (age 37)
- Place of birth: M'Pody, Ivory Coast
- Height: 1.78 m (5 ft 10 in)
- Position: Left back

Youth career
- 2004–2007: IFER
- 2007: Kabby Sport Bongouanou

Senior career*
Years	Team	Apps	(Gls)
2007–2011	Dinamo II București	23	(1)
2008–2011	Dinamo București	50	(0)
2012–2015	Dijon	19	(0)
2013	→ Standard Liège (loan)	10	(0)
2014	→ Gent (loan)	9	(0)
2015–2016	Ajaccio	30	(0)
2016–2018	Nîmes	33	(1)
2017–2018	→ Chamois Niortais (loan)	12	(0)
2019	Chauray	1	(0)
2019	Foolad	0	(0)
2019–2020	Gazélec Ajaccio	8	(0)
2021–2024	Pontarlier	48	(1)
Total		243	(3)

International career
2005	Ivory Coast U17	1	(0)
2008–2009	Ivory Coast U20		
2014	Ivory Coast	1	(0)
- * Club domestic league appearances and goals

Zié Diabaté (born 2 March 1989) is an Ivorian former professional footballer who plays as a defender.

== Club career ==
Diabaté was born on 2 March 1989 in M'Pody, Ivory Coast and began playing junior-level football in 2004 at IFER. In 2007 he moved to Kabby Sport Bongouanou. While playing for his youth national team in the 2007 Toulon Tournament, he was noticed by Dinamo București's coach Mircea Rednic who decided to bring him to the club in August 2007. At Dinamo he first played for the satellite team in Liga II. His Liga I debut for the senior squad occurred on 23 April 2008 when coach Cornel Țălnar sent him at halftime to replace Nino Pekarić in a 4–4 draw against Universitatea Craiova. He helped the club achieve what was dubbed "The wonder from Liberec" by winning the away game 3–0 against Slovan Liberec to force a penalty shoot-out after losing the first leg by the same score, ultimately qualifying for the 2009–10 Europa League group stage. During his five-season spell with The Red Dogs, Diabaté faced competition from Romanian international Cristian Pulhac for a place in the starting XI. Eventually, after playing well under coach Liviu Ciobotariu in the first half of the 2011–12 season, the club sold him for €500,000 to Ligue 1 side Dijon where coach Patrice Carteron wanted him. Despite Diabaté's departure, Dinamo went on to win the 2011–12 Cupa României without him.

Diabaté made his debut for Dijon on 21 January 2012 in a 2–1 victory against Istres in the Coupe de France. One week later he debuted in Ligue 1 in a 3–1 loss to Lyon. He made 14 league appearances until the end of the season, being unable to help the team avoid relegation. In the first half of the 2012–13 season, he appeared in only one game for Dijon in Ligue 2, and the club decided to loan him to Belgian club Standard Liège, reuniting there with coach Mircea Rednic. Diabaté returned to Dijon the following season, but his limited appearances before the mid-season break led to another loan spell in Belgium with Rednic's new team, Gent.

After his contract with Dijon ended, Diabaté signed with fellow Ligue 2 side Ajaccio in June 2015, playing regularly in the one season spent with The Bear. Then Diabaté went for the 2016–17 Ligue 2 season to play for Nîmes, where he continued to play on a regular basis, scoring a goal in a 2–2 draw against Strasbourg. In the following season, Nîmes loaned him to Chamois Niortais where he would play his last games in Ligue 2, totaling 80 appearances with one goal scored in the competition. After six months without a club, in January 2019, Diabaté joined Chauray in Championnat National 3, the fifth level in France. In March 2019, he moved to Persian Gulf Pro League club Foolad, but did not play there. He returned to France, playing eight games for Gazélec Ajaccio in Championnat National which is the third division. In July 2021, Diabaté joined fifth division side Pontarlier where he retired three years later.

== International career ==
Diabaté was called to the Ivory Coast U-17 team and played in a 1–1 draw against United States U-17 during the 2005 FIFA U-17 World Cup.

Diabaté played one game for Ivory Coast under coach Hervé Renard on 30 November 2014 in a 2–0 loss to South Africa in the friendly tournament called Nelson Mandela Challenge which took place outside FIFA's International Match Calendar. During the game, he had his side's biggest opportunity to score by executing a free kick over the crossbar.

== Career statistics ==
Appearances and goals by club, season and competition
Club	Season	League			National Cup		League Cup		Continental		Total	
Club	Season	Division	Apps	Goals	Apps	Goals	Apps	Goals	Apps	Goals	Apps	Goals
Dinamo București	2007–08	Liga I	1	0	0	0	—		0	0	1	0
Dinamo București	2008–09	Liga I	8	0	0	0	—		0	0	8	0
Dinamo București	2009–10	Liga I	8	0	3	0	—		6 (Note: Appearances in the Europa League)	0	17	0
Dinamo București	2010–11	Liga I	16	0	2	0	—		0	0	18	0
Dinamo București	2011–12	Liga I	17	0	3	0	—		4	0	24	0
Dinamo București	Total		50	0	8	0	—		10	0	68	0
Dijon	2011–12	Ligue 1	14	0	1	0	0	0	—		15	0
Dijon	2012–13	Ligue 2	1	0	0	0	2	0	—		3	0
Dijon	2013–14	Ligue 2	3	0	0	0	0	0	—		3	0
Dijon	2014–15	Ligue 2	1	0	1	0	0	0	—		2	0
Dijon	Total		19	0	2	0	2	0	—		23	0
Standard Liège (loan)	2012–13	Pro League	10	0	0	0	—		—		10	0
Gent (loan)	2013–14	Pro League	9	0	2	0	—		—		11	0
Ajaccio	2015–16	Ligue 2	30	0	1	0	1	0	—		32	0
Nîmes	2016–17	Ligue 2	30	1	0	0	1	0	—		31	1
Nîmes	2017–18	Ligue 2	3	0	0	0	0	0	—		3	0
Nîmes	Total		33	1	0	0	1	0	—		34	1
Chamois Niortais (loan)	2017–18	Ligue 2	12	0	3	0	0	0	—		15	0
Chauray	2018–19	National 3	1	0	0	0	0	0	—		1	0
Gazélec Ajaccio	2019–20	National	8	0	1	0	0	0	—		9	0
Pontarlier	2021–22	National 3	9	0	0	0	0	0	—		9	0
Pontarlier	2022–23	National 3	21	0	0	0	0	0	—		21	0
Pontarlier	2023–24	National 3	18	1	0	0	0	0	—		18	1
Pontarlier	Total		48	1	0	0	0	0	—		48	1
Career total			220	2	17	0	4	0	10	0	251	2

== Honours ==
Dinamo București

- Cupa României: 2011–12
