= Emilian Dolha =

Romanian former football goalkeeper

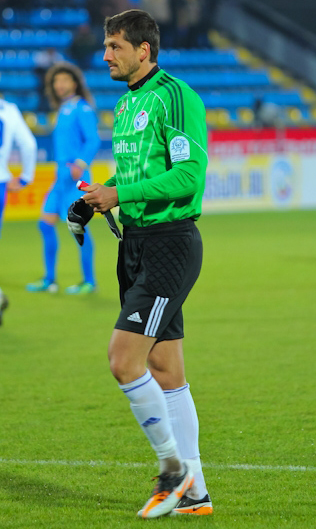
- With Fakel in 2012

Personal information
- Full name: Emilian Ioan Dolha
- Date of birth: 3 November 1979 (age 47)
- Place of birth: Turda, Romania
- Height: 1.95 m (6 ft 5 in)
- Position: Goalkeeper

Youth career
- –1997: Gloria Bistrița

Senior career*
| Years | Team | Apps | (Gls) |
| 1997–1999 | Gloria Bistrița | 3 | (0) |
| 1999–2000 | Olimpia Satu Mare | 13 | (0) |
| 2000–2006 | Rapid București | 77 | (0) |
| 2005–2006 | Rapid II București | 7 | (0) |
| 2006–2007 | Wisła Kraków | 20 | (0) |
| 2007–2008 | Lech Poznań | 10 | (0) |
| 2008–2011 | Dinamo București | 41 | (0) |
| 2010–2011 | Dinamo II București | 4 | (0) |
| 2011–2012 | Fakel Voronezh | 20 | (0) |
| 2012–2013 | Gloria Bistrița | 26 | (0) |
| 2013–2015 | Universitatea Cluj | 7 | (0) |
| Total | | 228 | (0) |

International career
| 1996 | Romania U18 | 1 | (0) |
| 2000–2001 | Romania U21 | 9 | (0) |
| 2000–2004 | Romania | 2 | (0) |

Managerial career
- 2016: Dinamo București U19 (GK coach)
- 2016–2017: Universitatea Cluj (GK coach)
- 2017: Voința Turnu Măgurele (GK coach)
- 2018: Sepsi OSK (GK coach)
- 2018: Șirineasa (GK coach)
- 2019–2020: Sepsi OSK (GK coach)
- 2020–2022: Universitatea II Craiova (GK coach)
- 2022: Dinamo București (GK coach)
- 2022: Mioveni (GK coach)
- 2023–2024: Sănătatea Cluj (GK coach)
- 2024–2026: Concordia Chiajna (GK coach)
- * Club domestic league appearances and goals

Emilian Ioan Dolha (born 3 November 1979) is a Romanian former professional footballer who played as a goalkeeper.

Dolha started his career with Gloria Bistrița, before representing other teams in his native Romania, such as Olimpia Satu Mare, Rapid București, Dinamo București and Universitatea Cluj. He spent two years in Poland, playing for Wisła Kraków and Lech Poznań, and had a one-year spell in Russia with Fakel Voronezh. He was known as a goalkeeper good at saving penalties.

== Club career ==
Dolha was born on 3 November 1979 in Turda, Romania and began playing junior-level football at Gloria Bistrița. He made his Divizia A debut on 14 September 1997 under coach Constantin Cârstea in Gloria's 2–0 away loss to Argeș Pitești. He went to Divizia B side, Olimpia Satu Mare, for the 1999–2000 season. Afterwards, Dolha returned to first league football, signing with Rapid București. His first trophy won with The Railwaymen was the 2001–02 Cupa României, but coach Mircea Rednic preferred to use Bogdan Stelea in the 2–1 victory against Dinamo București in the final. In the following season, Rednic selected him as first-choice goalkeeper, the team starting the season by winning the 2002 Supercupa României with a 2–1 win over Dinamo. They finished the season champions with Dolha appearing in 22 matches. Under Rednic's guidance, he then kept a clean sheet in another victory over Dinamo in the 2003 Supercupa României. In his last season spent at the club, the team managed to win another Cupa României, but coach Răzvan Lucescu used Dănuț Coman in the 1–0 win over Național București in the final.

In June 2006, Dolha went to play for Polish side Wisła Kraków where fellow Romanian, Dan Petrescu was coaching and was teammates with two other compatriots Hristu Chiacu and Norbert Varga. However, he made his Ekstraklasa debut under coach Dragan Okuka on 22 September in which he kept a clean sheet in the 2–0 win over Widzew Łódź. After keeping another clean sheet in a 2–0 win over Iraklis in the first round of the 2006–07 UEFA Cup, which went to extra time, he played another four games in the group stage. For the way he played for Wisla in his single season, Dolha was selected as the goalkeeper of the season. In the following season he played for Lech Poznań.

In June 2008, Dolha signed with Dinamo București where he had to compete with goalkeepers such as Bogdan Lobonț. The highlights of his three-season spell spent with The Red Dogs were six appearances in the 2009–10 Europa League group stage, including a clean sheet in the 1–0 win in the first leg against Sturm Graz and he saved a penalty in the 2–1 victory in the second leg. Another notable moment was his performance in a 1–0 away win in a derby against Steaua București, after which one of the club's officials gave him an Audemars Piguet watch which costs €20,000 as a gift.

Dolha went to play for Fakel Voronezh in the 2011–12 Russian second league. In a match against FC Rostov in the quarter-finals of the Russian Cup he saved three penalties in the penalty shoot-out, but his performance was not enough for his side to qualify further. At the end of his single season spent in Russia, Fakel was relegated to the third division. Afterwards, he returned to his first club, Gloria Bistrița where he was wanted by coach Nicolae Manea but even though he played regularly in the 2012–13 season, he could not avoid the team's relegation to the second division. However, Dolha continued to play in the first league, as he signed with Universitatea Cluj. In his second season, coach Adrian Falub gave him the last of his total 154 appearances in the competition on 23 May 2015 in a 2–1 away loss to Oțelul Galați after which "U" mathematically was relegated to the second division. Throughout his career, Dolha also played a total of 22 matches in European competitions.

== International career ==
Dolha played two friendly games for Romania, making his debut on 8 December 2000 under coach László Bölöni in a 3–2 victory against Algeria. His second game was a 3–0 win over Georgia.

== Honours ==
Rapid București

- Divizia A: 2002–03
- Cupa României: 2001–02, 2005–06
- Supercupa României: 2002, 2003

Dinamo București

- Cupa României runner-up: 2010–11

Universitatea Cluj

- Cupa României runner-up: 2014–15
