= Jasmin Trtovac =

Serbian footballer

Personal information
- Date of birth: 27 December 1986 (age 39)
- Place of birth: Novi Pazar, SFR Yugoslavia
- Height: 1.92 m (6 ft 3 1/2 in)
- Position: Centre-back

Team information
- Current team: FK Tutin

Senior career*
Years	Team	Apps	(Gls)
2005–2008	Novi Pazar	47	(2)
2008–2009	Gloria Bistrița	4	(1)
2009–2010	Novi Pazar	11	(1)
2010–2015	Gaz Metan Mediaș	83	(1)
2015–2016	Novi Pazar	20	(1)
2016–2017	Gaz Metan Mediaș	39	(2)
2017–2018	BB Erzurumspor	28	(0)
2019	Novi Pazar	15	(0)
2019–2021	Menemenspor	19	(0)
2022	Novi Pazar	0	(0)
2023–	Tutin		
- * Club domestic league appearances and goals as of 15 March 2020

Jasmin Trtovac (Serbian Cyrillic: Јасмин Тртовац; born 27 December 1986) is a Serbian footballer who plays for Serbian club FK Tutin.

He had previously played for Novi Pazar, Gloria Bistrița and Gaz Metan Mediaș.
