= Eugen Crăciun =

Romanian footballer

Personal information
- Full name: Eugen Florin Crăciun
- Date of birth: 22 March 1986 (age 40)
- Place of birth: Brăila, Romania
- Height: 1.80 m (5 ft 11 in)
- Position: Right-back

Youth career
- 1996–2000: Petrolul Ianca Brăila
- 2000–2004: ȘF Nicolae Dobrin

Senior career*
| Years | Team | Apps | (Gls) |
| 2005–2014 | Dinamo II București | 54 | (0) |
| 2006–2014 | Dinamo București | 2 | (0) |
| 2008–2009 | → Râmnicu Vâlcea (loan) | 7 | (0) |
| 2009–2010 | → Astra Ploiești (loan) | 45 | (1) |
| 2010 | → Astra II Giurgiu (loan) | 2 | (0) |
| 2011–2012 | Mioveni | 17 | (0) |
| 2014–2015 | Voluntari | 3 | (0) |
| Total | | 130 | (1) |
- * Club domestic league appearances and goals

Eugen Florin Crăciun (born 22 March 1986) is a Romanian former professional footballer who played as a right back or as a right midfielder for teams such as Dinamo București, CSM Râmnicu Vâlcea, Astra Ploiești or CS Mioveni, among others.
