= Josh Smith (soccer) =

American soccer player (born 1982)

Personal information
- Full name: Joshua Bailey Smith
- Date of birth: August 30, 1982 (age 44)
- Place of birth: Dallas, Texas, United States
- Height: 5 ft 9 in (1.75 m)
- Position: Midfielder

Youth career
- 2000–2003: Trinity University

Senior career*
Years	Team	Apps	(Gls)
2004–2005	Charleston Battery	45	(2)
2007	Atlanta Silverbacks	25	(2)
2008	Wilmington Hammerheads	18	(0)
- * Club domestic league appearances and goals as of September 8, 2008

Josh Smith (born August 30, 1982, in Dallas, Texas) is an American soccer midfielder, currently without a club. He was the 2003 NCAA Division III Player of the Year.

== College ==
Smith attended Trinity University, playing on the men's NCAA Division III soccer team from 2000 to 2003. He was a 2001 third team and a 2002 and 2003 first team Division III All American. He was also selected as the 2003 NSCAA Division III Player of the Year as Trinity won the Division III National Championship.

== Professional ==
In 2004, he turned professional with the Charleston Battery of the USL First Division. After two seasons in Charleston, he moved to the Atlanta Silverbacks for the 2006 season. Smith lost the 2007 season after tearing his anterior cruciate ligament. In 2008, he joined the Wilmington Hammerheads of the USL Second Division.
