= Sergiu Homei =

Romanian footballer (born 1987)

Personal information
- Full name: Sergiu Victor Homei
- Date of birth: 6 July 1987 (age 39)
- Place of birth: Năsăud, Romania
- Height: 1.83 m (6 ft 0 in)
- Position: Right back

Youth career
- Progresul Bistrița Năsăud
- Universitatea Cluj
- Liberty Oradea

Senior career*
Years	Team	Apps	(Gls)
2005–2006	Liberty Salonta	12	(1)
2006–2007	FC Sopron	14	(0)
2007–2010	Dinamo București	13	(0)
2008–2013	Dinamo II București	16	(0)
2007–2008	→ Politehnica Iași (loan)	28	(0)
2009–2010	→ Gloria Bistrița (loan)	28	(0)
2011	→ Unirea Urziceni (loan)	3	(0)
2012–2013	→ FCM Târgu Mureș (loan)	3	(0)
2013	ASA Târgu Mureș	7	(0)
2014	Corona Brașov	9	(0)
2014–2015	FC Botoșani	8	(0)
2016	Academica Clinceni	3	(0)
2016–2017	Neftochimic Burgas	25	(0)
2017	Pandurii Târgu Jiu	16	(0)
Total		185	(1)

International career^{‡}
2007–2010	Romania U-21	4	(0)
2010	Romania U-23	1	(0)
- * Club domestic league appearances and goals as of 12 December 2017 ‡ National team caps and goals as of 29 January 2018

Sergiu Victor Homei (born 6 July 1987) is a Romanian former football player. He played as a right back. Homei was a member of Romania's national under-21 football team.

== Career ==
Homei started professional football at the age of 17, playing for CF Liberty Salonta in Liga II, winning a place in the first eleven in the second part of the year. Liberty won Liga II that year, but UT Arad bought their place, and so they would play in the third division, Liga III. Homei subsequently transferred to MFC Sopron in the Bordosi Liga, where he played 14 matches in the first half of the season before moving to Dinamo București in Liga I. He played his first match in the top football league of Romania against FC Argeş Piteşti. In order to play more matches, Homei was loaned for one year to Politehnica Iaşi in the pre-season period of 2007. He returned to Dinamo in the summer of 2008, when his loan expired, and manifested his wish to be loaned again at Politehnica Iaşi. He was later loaned to Gloria Bistriţa, Unirea Urziceni and FCM Târgu Mureş. Homei never managed to make the step towards the first team at Dinamo and in 2013 he was released.

In January 2014, Homei signed a contract for 18 months with Corona Brașov. After the team was relegated from Liga I at the end of the 2013–14 season, Homei became a free agent and signed a contract for two years with FC Botoșani. Homei joined Bulgarian club Neftochimic Burgas in the summer of 2016.

In August 2017, Homei signed with Pandurii Târgu Jiu.

== Honours ==
Liberty Salonta

- Liga II: 2005–06

Dinamo București

- Liga I: 2006–07
