= Ciprian Brata =

Romanian footballer

Personal information
- Full name: Ciprian Florin Brata
- Date of birth: 24 March 1991 (age 35)
- Place of birth: Satu Mare, Romania
- Height: 1.80 m (5 ft 11 in)
- Position: Midfielder

Team information
- Current team: Zemendorf-Stöttera

Youth career
- 2004–2008: Olimpia Satu Mare

Senior career*
Years	Team	Apps	(Gls)
2008–2010	Silvania Șimleu Silvaniei	61	(14)
2010–2015	Pandurii Târgu Jiu	34	(2)
2012	→ Brașov (loan)	9	(0)
2013	→ Turnu Severin (loan)	10	(0)
2013–2014	→ Corona Brașov (loan)	15	(1)
2015	Botoșani	10	(0)
2016	Olimpia Satu Mare	14	(1)
2017	Olimpia Satu Mare	18	(2)
2019	Minaur Baia Mare	8	(2)
2019–2021	Comuna Recea	29	(1)
2021–2023	Satu Mare	40	(7)
2023–	Zemendorf-Stöttera	0	(0)

International career^{‡}
2011	Romania U-21	5	(0)
- * Club domestic league appearances and goals as of 12:41, 23 November 2023 (UTC) ‡ National team caps and goals as of 2 September 2011

Ciprian Florin Brata (born 24 March 1991) is a Romanian footballer who plays as a midfielder for Austrian lower division side Sportverein Zemendorf-Stöttera-Pöttelsdorf. In his career, Brata also played for teams such as: Silvania Șimleu, Pandurii Târgu Jiu and Olimpia Satu Mare, among others.

== Honours ==
ACSF Comuna Recea

- Liga III : 2019–20
