= Casian Maghici =

Romanian footballer

Personal information
- Full name: Casian Augustin Maghici
- Date of birth: 5 May 1984 (age 42)
- Place of birth: Arad, Romania
- Height: 1.82 m (6 ft 0 in)
- Position: Defender

Senior career*
Years	Team	Apps	(Gls)
2003–2004	ACU Arad	21	(2)
2004–2005	Apulum Alba Iulia	31	(3)
2005–2007	FC Brașov	39	(3)
2007–2008	Săcele	32	(1)
2008–2010	Târgu Mureș	33	(0)
2010–2011	Victoria Brănești	27	(1)
2011–2012	Voința Sibiu	16	(0)
2012–2014	Botoșani	16	(2)
2014–2015	Șoimii Pâncota	20	(0)
2015–2016	Hunedoara	18	(1)
2016–2017	Millenium Giarmata	24	(1)
2017–2019	Crișul Chișineu-Criș	26	(0)
2019–2020	Unirea Sântana	10	(0)
Total		313	(14)

Managerial career
- 2021: FC Brașov (assistant)
- * Club domestic league appearances and goals as of 09:44, 2 August 2021 (UTC)

Casian Augustin Maghici (born 5 May 1984) is a Romanian former footballer who played as a defender for teams such as Apulum Alba Iulia, FC Brașov (1936), FCM Târgu Mureș, Victoria Brănești or Crișul Chișineu-Criș, among others.
