= Óscar Rubio =

Spanish footballer

Personal information
- Full name: Óscar Rubio Fauria
- Date of birth: 14 May 1984 (age 42)
- Place of birth: Lleida, Spain
- Height: 1.72 m (5 ft 7 1/2 in)
- Position: Wing-back

Team information
- Current team: Lleida Esportiu
- Number: 12

Youth career
- 2000–2003: Lleida

Senior career*
Years	Team	Apps	(Gls)
2003–2007	Lleida	95	(5)
2003–2004	→ Tàrrega (loan)	?	(1)
2007–2008	Gimnàstic	29	(1)
2008–2010	Elche	60	(1)
2010–2011	Dinamo București	19	(1)
2011–2014	Alavés	94	(2)
2014–2015	Cádiz	21	(1)
2015–2017	Lleida Esportiu	73	(6)
2017–2022	Sabadell	157	(7)
2022–	Lleida Esportiu	103	(2)
Medal record
Dinamo București
Runner-up	Romanian Cup	2011
- * Club domestic league appearances and goals as of 23 November 2025

Óscar Rubio Fauria (born 14 May 1984) is a Spanish professional footballer who plays for Tercera Federación club Lleida Esportiu. On the right side of the field, he can operate as a defender or a midfielder.

== Club career ==
Born in Lleida, Catalonia, Rubio spent most of his career in his native region, representing UE Tàrrega, UE Lleida, Gimnàstic de Tarragona and Elche CF. During that spell he played five seasons in the Segunda División, the exception being 2006–07 in the Segunda División B with the second club.

In summer 2010, aged 26, Rubio moved abroad and joined FC Dinamo București of Liga I, being released at the end of the campaign by the Romanian team and returning to his country with Deportivo Alavés (third division). In his second year he contributed 41 games – playoffs included – as the Basques returned to the second tier after a four-year absence.

== Personal life ==
Rubio's father, Miguel Ángel Rubio, also played with Lleida, competing with the club in La Liga and later managing it.
