= Ersin Mehmedović =

Serbian footballer

Personal information
- Date of birth: 10 May 1981 (age 45)
- Place of birth: Novi Pazar, SFR Yugoslavia
- Height: 1.93 m (6 ft 4 in)
- Position: Centre-back

Youth career
- Tabor Sežana

Senior career*
Years	Team	Apps	(Gls)
1999–2000	Novi Pazar		
2000–2001	Tabor Sežana	1	(0)
2001–2002	Remont Čačak	15	(0)
2002–2004	Gent	3	(0)
2003–2004	→ KV Mechelen (loan)	29	(4)
2005–2007	Poli Timişoara	17	(0)
2005–2006	→ Național București (loan)	23	(0)
2007–2010	Unirea Urziceni	64	(0)
2011	Dinamo București	4	(1)
2011	Dinamo București II	4	(0)
2012–2013	Taraz	45	(3)
2014	Novi Pazar	4	(0)
2014	Vllaznia Shkodër	8	(0)
Total		217	(8)
- * Club domestic league appearances and goals as of 16 January 2016

Ersin Mehmedović (Serbian Cyrillic: Ерсин Мехмедовић; born 10 May 1981) is a retired Serbian football player.

Romanian Champion with FC Unirea Urziceni (2009).

== Career ==
Born in Novi Pazar, SR Serbia, then still within Yugoslavia, Mehmedović as defender was bought by the Liga 1 club FCU Politehnica Timişoara during the winter break of 2005 from Belgian side KAA Gent. He was then loaned out to FC Naţional București for the whole 2005/06 season. He returned to "Poli" when his loan ended. Despite earning himself a first team slot with Sorin Cârţu as manager, he was later dropped out of the squad and subsequently transferred to Unirea Urziceni in the summer of 2007. In February 2011, he signed a contract for six months with Dinamo București.

== Honours ==
Unirea Urziceni

- Liga I: 2008–09
