= Georgian Păun =

Romanian footballer

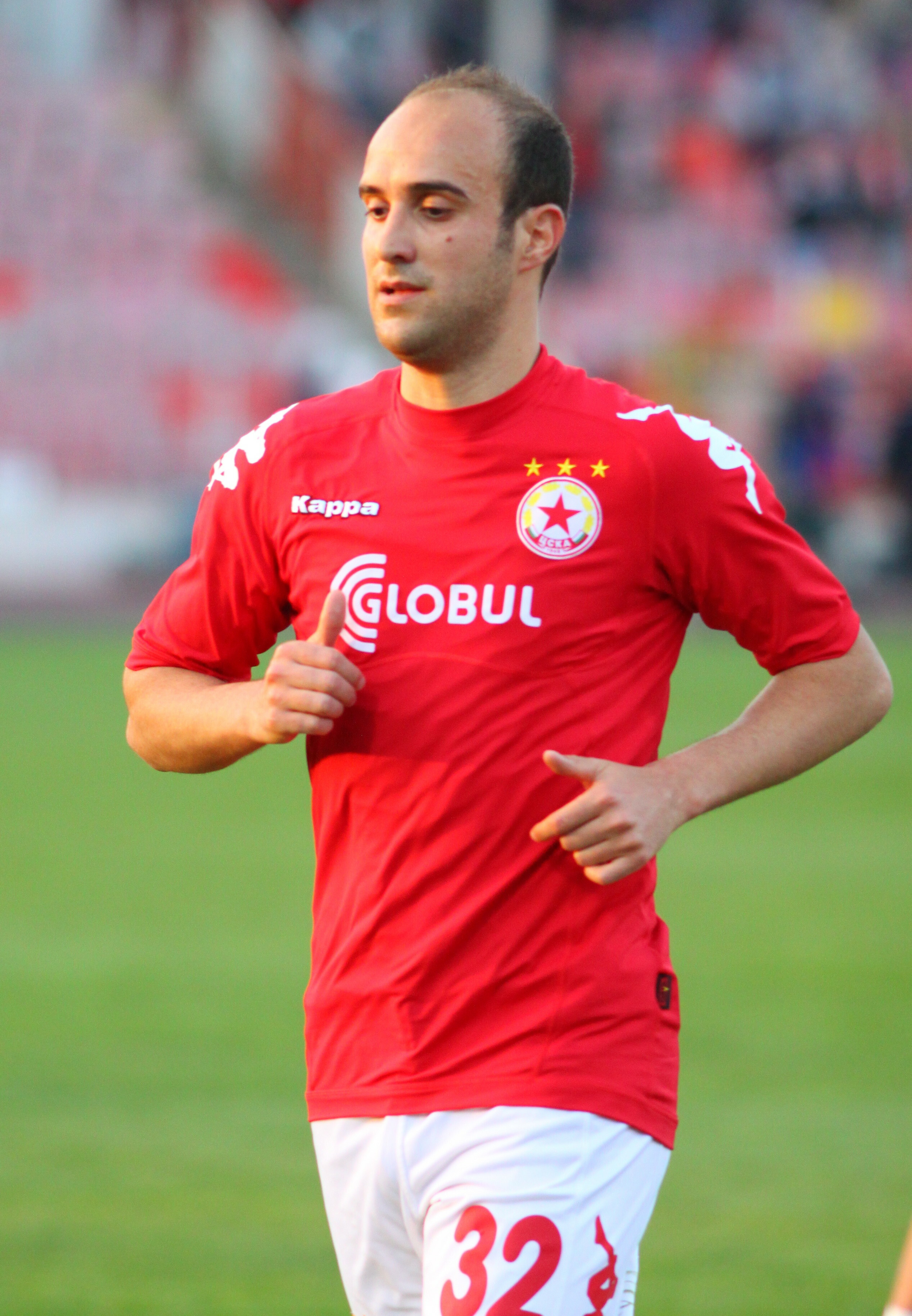

Personal information
- Date of birth: 24 October 1985 (age 41)
- Place of birth: Ploiești, Romania
- Height: 1.81 m (5 ft 11 in)
- Position: Striker

Youth career
- 1994–2002: Astra Ploiești

Senior career*
Years	Team	Apps	(Gls)
2002–2003	Metalul Plopeni	0	(0)
2003	Petrolul Ploiești	1	(0)
2004	Gloria Buzău	7	(0)
2004–2005	Conpet Ploiești	25	(2)
2005–2006	Astra Ploiești	0	(0)
2006–2012	Dinamo București	8	(0)
2006–2008	→ Dinamo II București	28	(15)
2008–2009	→ Astra Ploiești (loan)	40	(10)
2010	→ Politehnica Iași (loan)	12	(4)
2011	→ Dinamo II București	22	(10)
2012	→ CSKA Sofia (loan)	9	(2)
2012–2015	FC Brașov	36	(5)
2015–2016	Metalul Reșița	0	(0)
2016	Voința Saelele	0	(0)
2016–2018	Petrolul Ploiești	16	(4)
2018–2019	Farul Constanța	29	(7)
2020	Medgidia	6	(1)
2020–2021	Oțelul Galați	15	(6)
2023–2024	CSM Fetești	12	(4)
- * Club domestic league appearances and goals as of 30 April 2021

Georgian Păun (born 24 October 1985) is a Romanian professional footballer who plays as a striker. In his career he played for teams such as Dinamo București, Astra Ploiești, CSKA Sofia, FC Brașov, Petrolul Ploiești or Farul Constanța, among others.

== Honours ==
Oțelul Galați

- Liga III: 2020–21
