= Liviu Ganea =

Romanian footballer (born 1988)

Personal information
- Full name: Liviu Adrian Ganea
- Date of birth: 23 February 1988 (age 38)
- Place of birth: Brăila, Romania
- Height: 1.77 m (5 ft 10 in)
- Position: Striker

Youth career
- 1994–2001: Farul Constanța
- 2001–2004: Școala de Fotbal Gheorghe Popescu
- 2004–2005: Dinamo București

Senior career*
Years	Team	Apps	(Gls)
2005–2011	Dinamo II București	42	(11)
2005–2011	Dinamo București	55	(11)
2008–2009	→ Otopeni (loan)	25	(7)
2009–2010	→ Astra Ploiești (loan)	27	(11)
2012–2015	CFR Cluj	6	(0)
2013–2014	→ Concordia Chiajna (loan)	11	(0)
2014–2015	→ Brașov (loan)	23	(2)
2015–2016	CSMS Iași	3	(0)
2016	Academica Clinceni	13	(3)
2017–2019	Carmen București		
Total		206	(45)

International career
2004–2005	Romania U-17	6	(5)
2006–2007	Romania U-19	6	(5)
2007–2011	Romania U-21	20	(6)
2010	Romania U-23	1	(0)
2011	Romania	1	(0)
- * Club domestic league appearances and goals as of 28 October 2017

Liviu Adrian Ganea (born 23 February 1988) is a Romanian former footballer who played as a striker.

== Club career ==
Ganea was born on 23 February 1988 in Brăila, Romania and began playing junior-level football at six years old in 1994 at Farul Constanța. In 2001, he moved to Școala de Fotbal Gheorghe Popescu. Four years later he started his senior career at Dinamo București, making his Liga I debut on 15 October 2005 when coach Ioan Andone sent him in the 80th minute to replace Alexandru Bălțoi in a 5–0 home win over CFR Cluj. In the following season, he scored two goals in the league, the first one on 18 March 2007 in a 1–1 draw against UTA Arad, and the second on 29 April in a 2–0 win over Gloria Bistrița, totaling nine league games under coach Mircea Rednic, as the team won the title. Ganea was loaned by Dinamo to Otopeni for the 2008–09 season where he managed to score seven goals, but the club was relegated to Liga II. For the next season he was loaned to Astra Ploiești where he netted a personal record of 11 goals, one in each of the two victories against Rapid București and two doubles in the wins against Unirea Alba Iulia and Brașov. In 2010, Ganea returned to Dinamo, scoring eight goals during the 2010–11 season, most notably managing a brace in a 3–2 win in a derby against Rapid as the club made a comeback from 0–2.

In the middle of the 2011–12 season he left Dinamo to go to CFR Cluj where coaches Jorge Costa and Ioan Andone used him in five league matches as the team won the championship. In the following two seasons, CFR loaned him to Concordia Chiajna and Brașov, at the latter managing to score his last two goals in the Romanian league in a draw against Ceahlăul Piatra Neamț and a loss to Universitatea Craiova. Afterwards he joined CSMS Iași where he made his last Liga I appearances, totaling 150 matches with 31 goals in the competition and seven games with one goal in European competitions.

Ganea ended his career in 2019, after playing a few years in the Romanian lower leagues for Academica Clinceni and Carmen București.

== International career ==
Ganea played one friendly game in the Cyprus International Football Tournament for Romania, being used by coach Răzvan Lucescu to replace Sabrin Sburlea in the 68th minute of a 2–2 (2–4, after penalty kicks) loss against Ukraine.

== Honours ==
Dinamo București

- Liga I: 2006–07
- Cupa României: 2011–12
- Supercupa României: 2005

CFR Cluj

- Liga I: 2011–12
