= Bogdan Pătrașcu =

Romanian footballer

Personal information
- Full name: Bogdan Aurelian Pătrașcu
- Date of birth: 7 May 1979 (age 47)
- Place of birth: Târgoviște, Romania
- Height: 1.77 m (5 ft 10 in)
- Position: Defensive midfielder

Youth career
- Tracțiunea București
- PECO București
- –1996: Sportul Studențesc

Senior career*
Years	Team	Apps	(Gls)
1996–2000	Sportul Studențesc	94	(6)
2001	Litex Lovech	24	(1)
2002–2009	Piacenza	190	(2)
2008	→ Chievo (loan)	2	(0)
2009	→ Padova (loan)	14	(0)
2009–2010	Padova	23	(1)
2010–2011	Sportul Studențesc	13	(2)
2011–2012	Dinamo București	19	(0)
2012	Astra Ploiești	12	(1)
2012–2013	Universitatea Cluj	14	(1)
2013–2015	Academica Argeș	48	(1)
2015	Balotești	16	(1)
2016–2017	Voința Crevedia		
Total		469	(16)

International career
1998–1999	Romania U19	5	(0)
2000–2001	Romania U21	8	(0)
2006	Romania	2	(0)

Managerial career
- 2015: Balotești (player/coach)
- 2020–2021: Gaz Metan Mediaș (assistant)
- 2021: FC U Craiova (assistant)
- 2022–2023: Rapid București (assistant)
- 2023: Neftchi Baku (assistant)
- 2024: CFR Cluj (assistant)
- 2024–2025: Petrolul Ploiești (assistant)
- 2025: Tunari
- * Club domestic league appearances and goals

Bogdan Aurelian Pătrașcu (born 7 May 1979) is a Romanian professional football manager and former player.

== Career ==
Pătrașcu started his career at Sportul Studențesc, from where he was transferred to the Bulgarian club Litex Lovech in 2000. In 2002, he arrived in Italy, at Piacenza where he spent most of his career. In August 2008 he was loaned to Serie A newcomer Chievo.

In 2009, he signed a contract for a year with Padova, but in June 2010, he was released by Padova as the contract was not renewed.

He returned in Romania, to his ancient club, Sportul Studențesc. After half a season with Sportul, he was released following a mutual agreement, and signed a contract for one and a half years with Dinamo București. In February 2012, he was transferred to Astra Ploiești. His contract lasted only six months and wasn't renewed, so he became a free agent and signed a contract for a year with Universitatea Cluj.

== Honours ==
Litex Lovech

- Bulgarian Cup: 2000–01
