= FC Dinamo București II =

Romanian football club

Dinamo București II
- Full name: Fotbal Club Dinamo București II
- Nickname: Câinii roșii mici (Little red dogs)
- Short name: Dinamo II
- Founded: 2003
- Ground: Romprim
- Capacity: 2,500
- Manager: Constantin Stoian
- Coach: Adrian Ropotan
- League: Liga III
- 2025–26: Liga III, Seria III, 11th (relegated)
Home colours	Away colours	Third colours

Fotbal Club Dinamo București II, commonly known as Dinamo București II (Romanian pronunciation: [diˈnamo bukuˈreʃtʲ]) or simply Dinamo II, is the reserve squad of Romanian football side FC Dinamo București.

== History ==
One of the greatest performances in the history of the club was eliminating first league team Politehnica Timișoara with 3–2 in the sixteenths-finals phase of the 2004–05 Romanian Cup edition. They were eliminated in the next phase of the competition by FC Universitatea Craiova after losing with 3–2.

From 2007, Dinamo managed to keep its place in the second division, being close to relegation in 2010, when the team finished 15th, only one point above the relegation zone.

Across the years, the team was managed by former big players of the first squad: Ion Moldovan, Ionel Augustin, Dumitru Moraru, Costel Orac, Liviu Ciobotariu, Flavius Stoican, Ion Marin, Florentin Petre or Florin Bratu.

Dinamo II is a launching platform for players from the youth sector of the Bucharest club. During the years, players like Adrian Scarlatache, Ștefan Radu, Adrian Ropotan, Cristian Pulhac, Zié Diabaté, Marius Alexe, Constantin Nica or Nicolae Mitea made their breakthrough in football for the team.

Dinamo II relegated to the third division of Romanian football at the end of the 2012–13 season.

In the sixteenths-finals phase of the Cupa României 2016–17 edition Dinamo II played against their first team, Dinamo București, the game ending with a 2–1 loss for Dinamo II.

In the summer of 2017, Dinamo București owner, Ionuț Negoiță retired the team from Liga III and then dissolved it after 14 years of existence.

On 17 August 2020, only days after Negoiță sold the club to Benel International SA, the Spanish company decided to refound the second team, name it Dinamo B and to register to the Liga III.

In 2022, after the relegation to the Liga IV, Dinamo II was dissolved.

== Players ==
=== Current squad ===
Note: Flags indicate national team as defined under FIFA eligibility rules; some limited exceptions apply. Players may hold more than one non-FIFA nationality.

No.	Pos.	Nation	Player
—	GK	ROU	Vlad Cherciu
—	GK	ROU	Mario Din-Licaciu
—	GK	ROU	Costin Ungureanu
—	DF	ROU	Tudor Alistar
—	DF	ROU	Daniel Bobocea
—	DF	ROU	Mihai Enache
—	DF	ROU	Luca Fudulache
—	DF	ROU	Adrian Năstase
—	DF	ROU	Ianys Neculai
—	DF	ROU	Cristian Oancea
—	DF	ROU	Andrei Pașcalău
—	DF	MDA	Alexandru Tabuncic

No.	Pos.	Nation	Player
—	MF	ROU	Andrei Bambu
—	MF	ROU	Ianis Dateș
—	MF	ROU	Darius Gavrilă
—	MF	ROU	Liviu Hrișcă
—	MF	ROU	Eduard Ilincaș
—	MF	ROU	Cătălin Iordache
—	MF	ROU	Denis Lazăr
—	MF	ROU	Erik Mititelu
—	MF	ROU	Matteo N’Giuwu
—	MF	ROU	Răzvan Tarbu
—	MF	ROU	Alexandru Trandafir
—	MF	NGR	Godwin Udosen
—	FW	ROU	Traian Ciubotaru
—	FW	ROU	David Diniță
—	FW	ROU	Eric Dogaru
—	FW	ROU	Lucas Drăghia
—	FW	ROU	Andrei Ionică
—	FW	ROU	Luca Marinescu
—	FW	ROU	Daniel Savu
—	FW	ROU	Adrian Sârbu
—		ROU	Darius Ciuleanu
—		ROU	Filip Ionescu
—		ROU	Adrian Mângâță
—		ROU	Călin Paraschiv
—		ROU	Tudor Vărzan

=== Out on loan ===
Note: Flags indicate national team as defined under FIFA eligibility rules; some limited exceptions apply. Players may hold more than one non-FIFA nationality.

No.	Pos.	Nation	Player
—	DF	ROU	Rareș Dobîndă (at Urban Titu until 30 June 2027)
—	DF	ROU	Raul Oprea (at Dunărea Călărași until 30 June 2027)
—	FW	ROU	Dennis Dicu (at CS Blejoi until 30 June 2027)

No.	Pos.	Nation	Player
—	FW	ROU	Bogdan Pitulac (at CSM Râmnicu Vâlcea until 30 June 2027)
—		ROU	Andrei Avram (at CS Dinamo București until 30 June 2027)

== Club officials ==
=== Current technical staff ===
Role	Name
Team Manager	(Romania) Lucas Cladoveanu
Head coach	(Romania) Adrian Ropotan
Assistant coaches	(Romania) Andrei Lungu
Goalkeeping coach	(Romania) Ionut Vreme
Fitness coaches	(Tunisia) Ben Salah
Video Analyst	(Romania) Rareş Tãtar
Medical staff	(Romania) Cristian Toma

== Honours ==
- Liga III
  - Winners (1): 2006–07

== League history ==
Season	Tier	League	Place	Notes	Cupa României
2026–27	3	Liga III (Seria III)	TBD		
2025–26	3	Liga III (Seria III)	11th	Spared of (R)	
2022–25	Not active				
2021–22	3	Liga III (Seria IV)	9th	Relegated	
2020–21	3	Liga III (Seria IV)	7th		
2017–20	Not active				
2016–17	3	Liga III (Seria II)	8th	Relegated	Round of 32
2015–16	3	Liga III (Seria II)	9th		
2014–15	3	Liga III (Seria II)	6th		
2013–14	3	Liga III (Seria III)	7th		

Season	Tier	League	Place	Notes	Cupa României
2012–13	2	Liga II (Seria I)	13th	Relegated	
2011–12	2	Liga II (Seria I)	13th		
2010–11	2	Liga II (Seria I)	12th		
2009–10	2	Liga II (Seria I)	15th		
2008–09	2	Liga II (Seria I)	9th		
2007–08	2	Liga II (Seria I)	10th		
2006–07	3	Liga III (Seria II)	1st (C)	Promoted	
2005–06	2	Liga II (Seria II)	15th	Relegated	
2004–05	2	Divizia B (Seria II)	8th		Round of 16
2003–04	3	Divizia C (Seria III)	4th	Promoted	
