= 2012–13 CFR Cluj season =

CFR Cluj
2012–13 season
- Owner: Árpád Pászkány
- Manager: Ioan Andone (until 24 October 2012); Paulo Sérgio (from 30 October 2012 to 13 April 2013); Eugen Trică (from 13 April 2013)
- Stadium: Dr. Constantin Rădulescu Stadium
- Liga I: 9th
- Cupa României: Runners-up
- Supercupa României: Runners-up
- UEFA Champions League: Group stage
- UEFA Europa League: Round of 32
- Top goalscorer: League: Rui Pedro (7)
- Biggest win: 5–0 v Brașov (Home, 3 November 2012, Liga I); 5–0 v Gloria Bistrița (Away, 21 April 2013, Liga I)
- Biggest defeat: 0–3 v Internazionale (Home, 21 February 2013, UEFA Europa League)
Home colours	Away colours	Third colours

The 2012–13 season was Fotbal Club CFR 1907 Cluj's 9th consecutive season in the Liga I and 100th season in existence as a football club. In addition to the domestic league, CFR Cluj participated in the Cupa României, the Supercupa României, the UEFA Champions League and the UEFA Europa League.

== Squad ==
Squad at end of season

Note: Flags indicate national team as defined under FIFA eligibility rules; some limited exceptions apply. Players may hold more than one non-FIFA nationality.

No.	Pos.	Nation	Player
1	GK	POR	Mário Felgueiras
3	DF	POR	Ivo Pinto
4	DF	ROU	Cristian Panin
5	MF	CIV	Bakary Saré
6	MF	ROU	Gabriel Mureșan
7	MF	ROU	Ciprian Deac
8	DF	ROU	László Sepsi
9	FW	GRE	Pantelis Kapetanos
10	MF	POR	Diogo Valente
11	FW	FRA	Robert Maah
12	DF	ROU	Vasile Maftei
13	DF	ITA	Felice Piccolo
15	MF	ANG	Dominique Kivuvu
17	FW	ROU	Sergiu Buș
18	MF	HUN	Ádám Vass
19	FW	CRO	Saša Bjelanović
20	DF	POR	Cadú
22	MF	ROU	Ioan Hora
23	MF	FRA	Nicolas Godemèche

No.	Pos.	Nation	Player
24	DF	ROU	Ionuț Rada
25	MF	ROU	Szilárd Vereș
26	MF	POR	Celestino
27	FW	BRA	Ronny
30	FW	POR	Rui Pedro
32	GK	ROU	Mihai Mincă
38	FW	AUS	Anthony Carter
40	MF	NGR	Nwankwo Obiora
44	GK	ROU	Eduard Stăncioiu
45	DF	POR	Camora
48	MF	GHA	Sulley Muniru
55	DF	POR	Nuno Diogo
61	GK	ROU	Man Cristian
62	FW	ROU	Adrian Păun
83	MF	BRA	Juan Carlos Martinez
86	FW	BRA	Weldon
88	FW	ROU	Liviu Ganea
98	GK	POR	Nuno Claro

== Competitions ==
=== Overview ===
Competition	First match	Last match	Starting round	Final position	Record							
Competition	First match	Last match	Starting round	Final position	Pld	W	D	L	GF	GA	GD	Win %
Liga I	21 July 2012	29 May 2013	Matchday 1	9th	34	12	13	9	56	39	+17	35.29
Cupa României	26 September 2012	1 June 2013	Round of 32	Runners-up	6	4	1	1	8	2	+6	66.67
Supercupa României	14 July 2012		Final	Runners-up	1	0	1	0	2	2	+0	0.00
UEFA Champions League	1 August 2012	5 December 2012	Third qualifying round	Group stage	10	7	1	2	15	9	+6	70.00
UEFA Europa League	14 February 2013	21 February 2013	Round of 32	Round of 32	2	0	0	2	0	5	−5	0.00
Total					53	23	16	14	81	57	+24	43.40

Source: Competitions

=== Liga I ===
==== League table ====
Pos	Team	Pld	W	D	L	GF	GA	GD	Pts	Qualification or relegation
7	Brașov	34	14	9	11	50	51	−1	51	
8	Rapid București (R)	34	13	10	11	35	35	0	49 (Note: CFR 0-0 RAP; RAP 3-2 CFR)	Relegation to Liga II (Note: Rapid did not obtain a licence for the 2013–14 season, therefore Concordia Chiajna were spared from relegation.)
9	CFR Cluj	34	12	13	9	56	39	+17	49	
10	Gaz Metan Mediaș	34	12	10	12	42	46	−4	46	
11	Oțelul Galați (Note: Oțelul Galați were deducted two points because of debts owed to agent Codoban Tătar Ionel.)	34	11	10	13	38	42	−4	41	

Source: Liga I (in Romanian)
Rules for classification: 1) points; 2) head-to-head points; 3) head-to-head goal difference; 4) head-to-head goals scored; 5) goal difference; 6) number of goals scored.
(R) Relegated

==== Results summary ====
Overall								Home						Away					
Pld	W	D	L	GF	GA	GD	Pts	W	D	L	GF	GA	GD	W	D	L	GF	GA	GD
34	12	13	9	56	39	+17	49	5	6	6	28	21	+7	7	7	3	28	18	+10

Source: Soccerway

==== Matches ====
21 July 2012 1	CFR Cluj	1–1	Gaz Metan Mediaș	Cluj-Napoca
21:30 EEST (UTC+3)	Pinto (yellow card) 50'; Bastos (yellow card) 56'; Kapetanos 60'; Camora (yellow card) 83'; Rada (yellow card) 89'	Report	Vasilache 28'; Buchta (yellow card) 80'; Negru (yellow card) 83'; Roman (yellow card) 90+2'	Stadium: Dr. Constantin Rădulescu Stadium

27 July 2012 2	Ceahlăul Piatra Neamț	2–2	CFR Cluj	Piatra Neamț
21:30 EEST (UTC+3)	Ichim 28'; Marc (yellow card) 45'; Tolimir (yellow card) 56', (goal) 66'	Report	Kapetanos 20'; Maftei (yellow card) 28', (goal) 77'	Stadium: Ceahlăul Municipal Stadium

4 August 2012 3	CFR Cluj	3–0	Vaslui	Cluj-Napoca
21:45 EEST (UTC+3)	Cadú 17' (pen.); Bastos (yellow card) 22', (goal) 69', 83'; Nicoară (yellow card) 37'; Camora (yellow card) 90+7'	Report	Sălăgeanu (yellow card) 32'; Charalambous (yellow card) 45+1'; Davide (yellow card) 76'; Milanov (yellow card) 78'; N'Doye (yellow card) 88'; Sânmărtean (yellow card) 90+4'	Stadium: Dr. Constantin Rădulescu Stadium

13 August 2012 4	Oțelul Galați	1–2	CFR Cluj	Galați
19:00 EEST (UTC+3)	Inkango 38'; Costin (yellow card) 42'; Perendija (yellow card) 69'	Report	Mureșan 7' (pen.), (red card) 23'; Vass (yellow card) 39'; Ronny 52'; Godemèche (yellow card) 79'	Stadium: Oțelul Stadium

17 August 2012 5	CFR Cluj	2–2	CSMS Iași	Cluj-Napoca
20:30 EEST (UTC+3)	Cadú 21' (pen.); Vass (yellow card) 48'; Hora 73'	Report	Crețu (yellow card) 20'; Țigănașu (yellow card) 59'; Milea (yellow card) 59', (goal) 69'; Hergheligiu 72'	Stadium: Dr. Constantin Rădulescu Stadium

25 August 2012 6	Rapid București	3–2	CFR Cluj	Bucharest
21:30 EEST (UTC+3)	Oroș (yellow card) (yellow-red card) 28'; Herea (yellow card) 45+1'; Ilijoski 49'; Grigore 61' (pen.), 69', (yellow card) 75'	Report	Ronny 14'; Maftei 18'; Hora (yellow card) 23'; Nicoară (yellow card) 28'; Felgueiras (yellow card) 60'; Rui Pedro (yellow card) 81'	Stadium: Stadionul Giulești-Valentin Stănescu

2 September 2012 7	CFR Cluj	2–2	Petrolul Ploiești	Cluj-Napoca
20:50 EEST (UTC+3)	Kapetanos 28'; Maftei (yellow card) 36'; Cadú (yellow card) 45'; Mureșan 78'; Piccolo (yellow card) 90+1'	Report	Bokila 13'; Marinescu (yellow card) 37'; Cadú 62' (o.g.); Khamutowski (yellow card) 82'; Younés (yellow card) 90'; Boudjemaa (yellow card) 90+4'	Stadium: Dr. Constantin Rădulescu Stadium

14 September 2012 8	Dinamo București	0–1	CFR Cluj	Bucharest
21:30 EEST (UTC+3)	Munteanu (yellow card) 8'; Mansaly (yellow card) 35'	Report	Piccolo (yellow card) 27'; Godemèche (yellow card) 45'; Rui Pedro 64'	Stadium: Dinamo Stadium

23 September 2012 9	Pandurii Târgu Jiu	2–1	CFR Cluj	Târgu Jiu
21:30 EEST (UTC+3)	Maxim 50' (pen.); Viera (yellow card) 58'; Răduț 81' (pen.)	Report	Bjelanović (yellow card) 29'; Bastos 53'; Nicoară (yellow card) 71'; Pinto (yellow card) 80'; Mureșan (yellow card) 90+1'; Cadú (red card) 90+5'	Stadium: Stadionul Tudor Vladimirescu

29 September 2012 10	CFR Cluj	5–1	Gloria Bistrița	Cluj-Napoca
19:00 EEST (UTC+3)	Kapetanos 5', (yellow card) 55'; Mureșan 35' (pen.), 55'; Aguirregaray (red card) 60'; Bjelanović 88'; Luís Alberto 90+1'	Report	Kanon (red card) 33'; Năstase (yellow card) 45'; Anton (yellow card) 54'; Zahiri 90+4'	Stadium: Dr. Constantin Rădulescu Stadium

7 October 2012 11	Steaua București	1–0	CFR Cluj	Bucharest
20:30 EEST (UTC+3)	Szukała (yellow card) 37'; Georgievski (yellow card) 41'; Rusescu 75'; Pintilii (yellow card) 90+4'	Report	Sepsi (yellow card) 5'; Mureșan (yellow card) 10'; Bastos (yellow card) 73'; Rui Pedro (yellow card) 75'; Kapetanos (yellow card) 78'	Stadium: Arena Națională

18 October 2012 12	CFR Cluj	0–1	Viitorul Constanța	Cluj-Napoca
19:30 EEST (UTC+3)	Valente (yellow card) 34'; Sepsi (yellow card) 74'; Bastos (yellow card) 76'; Camora (yellow card) 77'; Kapetanos (yellow card) 85'; Bjelanović (yellow card) 90+3'	Report	Iancu 20'; Dică (red card) 60'; Alibec (yellow card) 71'; Bejan (yellow card) 75'; Buzbuchi (yellow card) 77'	Stadium: Dr. Constantin Rădulescu Stadium

27 October 2012 13	Turnu Severin	1–3	CFR Cluj	Drobeta-Turnu Severin
19:00 EEST (UTC+3)	Arnăutu 49'; Zaharia (yellow card) 58'; Dragalina (yellow card) 74'; Golić (yellow card) 90+2'; Gugu (yellow card) 90+3'	Report	Hora 13'; Rui Pedro 16'; Nicoară (yellow card) 83'; Mureșan (yellow card) 85'; Cadú 90' (pen.)	Stadium: Drobeta-Turnu Severin Municipal Stadium

3 November 2012 14	CFR Cluj	5–0	Brașov	Cluj-Napoca
19:30 EET (UTC+2)	Kapetanos 14'; Luís Alberto (yellow card) 15'; Mureșan 55'; Cadú 66' (pen.); Rui Pedro 69'; Aguirregaray 81'; Camora (yellow card) 90+2'	Report	Taborda (yellow card) 63'; Păun (yellow card) 75'	Stadium: Dr. Constantin Rădulescu Stadium

11 November 2012 15	Concordia Chiajna	1–2	CFR Cluj	Chiajna
19:00 EET (UTC+2)	Pană 55'; Ghionea (yellow card) 79'	Report	Rui Pedro 33'; Mureșan (yellow card) 35'; Sougou (yellow card) 36', (goal) 57'; Piccolo (yellow card) 74'; Bastos (yellow card) 90+4'	Stadium: Concordia Stadium

16 November 2012 16	CFR Cluj	0–2	Astra Giurgiu	Cluj-Napoca
19:00 EET (UTC+2)	Sougou (yellow card) 45'; Pinto (yellow card) 45'; Bastos (yellow card) 86'	Report	Budescu (yellow card) 37', (goal) 45'; Seto (yellow card) 59'; Găman (yellow card) 81'; Ivanovski 86'; Lung (yellow card) 90+1'	Stadium: Dr. Constantin Rădulescu Stadium

24 November 2012 17	Universitatea Cluj	1–2	CFR Cluj	Cluj-Napoca
18:00 EET (UTC+2)	Dinu 20' (pen.); Muzac (yellow card) 21'; Alex (yellow card) 58'; Krumov (yellow card) 58' (yellow-red card) 74'	Report	Diogo (yellow card) 19'; Celestino (yellow card) 47'; Rui Pedro 70'; Bjelanović 80', (yellow card) 90+3'; Vass (yellow card) 89'	Stadium: Cluj Arena

1 December 2012 18	Gaz Metan Mediaș	1–1	CFR Cluj	Mediaș
20:30 EET (UTC+2)	Marković (yellow card) 29' (yellow-red card) 84'; Llullaku 57'	Report	Hora (yellow card) 33'; Valente 36'; Rada (yellow card) 75'; Bastos (yellow card) 76'	Stadium: Gaz Metan Stadium

9 December 2012 19	CFR Cluj	3–2	Ceahlăul Piatra Neamț	Cluj-Napoca
18:00 EET (UTC+2)	Rui Pedro 20'; Deac (yellow card) 41', (goal) 55' (pen.); Kapetanos 85'	Report	Monroy (yellow card) 17'; Golubović 38'; Achim 90+1'	Stadium: Dr. Constantin Rădulescu Stadium

25 February 2013 20	Vaslui	0–0	CFR Cluj	Vaslui
20:30 EET (UTC+2)	Sălăgeanu (yellow card) 43'	Report	Weldon (yellow card) 14'; Valente (yellow card) 38' (yellow-red card) 45+1'; Cadú (red card) 42'; Felgueiras (yellow card) 85'	Stadium: Municipal Stadium

2 March 2013 21	CFR Cluj	0–1	Oțelul Galați	Cluj-Napoca
21:30 EET (UTC+2)	Sepsi (yellow card) 22'; Piccolo (yellow card) 55'; Godemèche (yellow card) 80' (yellow-red card) 90+2'; Felgueiras (yellow card) 80'; Camora (yellow card) 80'	Report	Paraschiv 8'; Sîrghi (yellow card) 51'; Iorga (yellow card) 62'; Filip (yellow card) 67'; Grahovac (yellow card) 90'	Stadium: Dr. Constantin Rădulescu Stadium

9 March 2013 22	CSMS Iași	1–1	CFR Cluj	Iași
19:00 EET (UTC+2)	Keita (yellow card) 44'; Milea 56'; Pătulea (yellow card) 82'; Ionescu (yellow card) 86'; Mitrea (yellow card) 90+2'	Report	Hora (yellow card) 6'; Rada 69'; Kapetanos (yellow card) 72'; Camora (yellow card) 77'	Stadium: Emil Alexandrescu Stadium

18 March 2013 23	CFR Cluj	0–0	Rapid București	Cluj-Napoca
21:30 EET (UTC+2)	Rada (yellow card) 54'; Camora (yellow card) 90+5'	Report	Oroș (yellow card) 29'	Stadium: Dr. Constantin Rădulescu Stadium

31 March 2013 24	Petrolul Ploiești	1–1	CFR Cluj	Ploiești
18:00 EEST (UTC+3)	Bokila (yellow card) 15'; Sauvadet (yellow card) 55'; Younés 60'; Mojica (yellow card) 74'	Report	Rada (yellow card) 15'; Weldon 79'; Kapetanos (yellow card) 89'	Stadium: Ilie Oană Stadium

6 April 2013 25	CFR Cluj	0–1	Dinamo București	Cluj-Napoca
21:30 EEST (UTC+3)	Kapetanos (yellow card) 49'; Mureșan (yellow card) 56'	Report	Dănciulescu 63'; Rus (yellow card) 65'; Mansaly (yellow card) 73'; Bălgrădean (yellow card) 90+3'	Stadium: Dr. Constantin Rădulescu Stadium

12 April 2013 26	CFR Cluj	2–3	Pandurii Târgu Jiu	Cluj-Napoca
21:30 EEST (UTC+3)	Mureșan (yellow card) 20'; Rui Pedro (yellow card) 54' (yellow-red card) 65'; Rada 55'; Bjelanović (yellow card) 89', (goal) 90+4'	Report	Ibeh 7'; Anton (yellow card) 36'; Mamele (yellow card) 54'; Matulevičius 67'; Voiculeț 71'	Stadium: Dr. Constantin Rădulescu Stadium

21 April 2013 27	Gloria Bistrița	0–5	CFR Cluj	Bistrița
19:00 EEST (UTC+3)	Curtuiuș (yellow card) 47'; Țîrcă (yellow card) 51'; Dolha (red card) 60'; Pop (yellow card) 85'	Report	Hora 17'; Maah (yellow card) 30'; Cadú 63' (pen.); Weldon 66'; Deac 86' (pen.); Buș 90'	Stadium: Jean Pădureanu Stadium

28 April 2013 28	CFR Cluj	0–0	Steaua București	Cluj-Napoca
20:30 EEST (UTC+3)	Piccolo (yellow card) 49'; Rada (yellow card) 86'	Report	Prepeliță (yellow card) 53'; Chipciu (yellow card) 83'	Stadium: Dr. Constantin Rădulescu Stadium

5 May 2013 29	Viitorul Constanța	0–2	CFR Cluj	Constanța
20:00 EEST (UTC+3)	Chițu (yellow card) 33'; Mitriță (yellow card) 41'; Mladen (yellow card) 54'; Larie (yellow card) 55'; Alibec (yellow card) 90+2' (red card) 90+4'	Report	Hora (yellow card) 27'; Deac 51'; Piccolo (yellow card) 60'; Buș 77'	Stadium: Stadionul Farul

9 May 2013 30	CFR Cluj	1–3	Turnu Severin	Cluj-Napoca
17:00 EEST (UTC+3)	Rui Pedro 14'; Cadú (yellow card) 32'; Saré (yellow card) 67'	Report	Costea 12', 43'; Hasanović (yellow card) 36'; Vranjković 59'	Stadium: Dr. Constantin Rădulescu Stadium

13 May 2013 31	Brașov	0–0	CFR Cluj	Brașov
19:30 EEST (UTC+3)	I. Popa (yellow card) 14'; Ionescu (yellow card) 29'; Păun (yellow card) 79'	Report	Maftei (red card) 75'	Stadium: Silviu Ploeșteanu Stadium

17 May 2013 32	CFR Cluj	1–1	Concordia Chiajna	Cluj-Napoca
19:30 EEST (UTC+3)	Hora (yellow card) 9'; Weldon (yellow card) 36'; Cadú (yellow card) 83'; Bjelanović 90+1'	Report	Purece (yellow card) 47'; Serediuc (yellow card) 77'; Bambara 84'	Stadium: Dr. Constantin Rădulescu Stadium

26 May 2013 33	Astra Giurgiu	3–3	CFR Cluj	Giurgiu
21:30 EEST (UTC+3)	Fatai 8', 10'; Ben Youssef (red card) 13'; Florescu (yellow card) 20'; Seto 39'; Lung (yellow card) 79'; Bărboianu (yellow card) 90+2'	Report	Mureșan 14' (pen.), (yellow card) 64'; Weldon (yellow card) 22'; Obiora (yellow card) 24'; Maah 33', 82'	Stadium: Marin Anastasovici Stadium

29 May 2013 34	CFR Cluj	3–1	Universitatea Cluj	Cluj-Napoca
19:00 EEST (UTC+3)	Maah 6', 80', 88'; Maftei (yellow card) 25'; Saré (yellow card) 68'	Report	Székely 65', (yellow card) 89'; A. Popa (yellow card) 90+3'; Ninu (yellow card) 90+3'	Stadium: Dr. Constantin Rădulescu Stadium

=== Cupa României ===
26 September 2012 Round of 32	Berceni	0–2	CFR Cluj	Berceni
19:00 EEST (UTC+3)	78'; 90'	Report		Stadium: Stadionul Berceni

31 October 2012 Round of 16	CFR Cluj	2–0	Botoșani	Cluj-Napoca
18:45 EET (UTC+2)	Bjelanović 57'; Luís Alberto 62'	Report		Stadium: Dr. Constantin Rădulescu Stadium

28 November 2012 Quarter-finals	CFR Cluj	2–1 (a.e.t.)	Dinamo București	Cluj-Napoca
20:30 EET (UTC+2)	Bastos 66'; Mureșan 101'	Report	Mansaly (red card) 31'; Alexe 62'; Nica (red card) 114'	Stadium: Dr. Constantin Rădulescu Stadium

16 April 2013 Semi-finals First leg	CFR Cluj	0–0	Astra Giurgiu	Cluj-Napoca
20:30 EEST (UTC+3)	Mureșan (red card) 30'	Report		Stadium: Dr. Constantin Rădulescu Stadium

22 May 2013 Semi-finals Second leg	Astra Giurgiu	0–2 (0–2 agg.)	CFR Cluj	Giurgiu
20:30 EEST (UTC+3)		Report	Hora 20'; Valente 90'	Stadium: Marin Anastasovici Stadium
Note: CFR Cluj won 2–0 on aggregate.

1 June 2013 Final	Petrolul Ploiești	1–0	CFR Cluj	Bucharest
20:45 EEST (UTC+3)	Bokila 9'	Report		Stadium: Arena Națională

=== Supercupa României ===
As the defending Liga I champions, CFR Cluj faced reigning Cupa României winners Dinamo București in the Supercupa României.

14 July 2012 Final	CFR Cluj	2–2 (a.e.t.) (2–4 p)	Dinamo București	Bucharest
21:00 EEST (UTC+3)	Deac (yellow card) 11'; Sougou (yellow card) 29'; Valente 36'; Cadú (yellow card) 50' (yellow-red card) 64'; Camora (yellow card) 76'; Kapetanos 101'	Report	Țucudean 61', 100', (yellow card) 62'; Mansaly (yellow card) 95'; Grigore (yellow card) 107'; Munteanu (yellow card) 111'	Stadium: Arena Națională
Note: Dinamo București won 4–2 on penalties.

=== UEFA Champions League ===
==== Qualifying rounds ====
===== Third qualifying round =====
1 August 2012 First leg	CFR Cluj (Romania)	1–0	(Czech Republic) Slovan Liberec	Cluj-Napoca, Romania
21:45 EEST (UTC+3)	Cadú 53' (pen.); Deac (yellow card) 64'; Rada (yellow card) 70'; Camora (yellow card) 88'	Report	Breznaník (yellow card) 27'; Tóth (yellow card) 52'; Hadaščok (yellow card) 61'	Stadium: Dr. Constantin Rădulescu Stadium; Attendance: 6,914; Referee: Bülent Yıldırım (Turkey); Assistant referees: Çem Satma (Turkey), Erdinç Sezertam (Turkey); Fourth official: Barış Şimşek (Turkey)

8 August 2012 Second leg	Slovan Liberec (Czech Republic)	1–2 (1–3 agg.)	(Romania) CFR Cluj	Liberec, Czech Republic
19:00 CEST (UTC+2)	Šural (yellow card) 46', (goal) 58'; Blažek (yellow card) 62'; Kelić (yellow card) 79'	Report	Kapetanos 45+1'; Rada (yellow card) 79'; Sougou 90+4'	Stadium: Stadion u Nisy; Attendance: 5,537; Referee: Serge Gumienny (Belgium); Assistant referees: Frank Bleyen (Belgium), Kristof Meers (Belgium); Fourth official: Peter Vervecken (Belgium)
Note: CFR Cluj won 3–1 on aggregate.

==== Play-off round ====
21 August 2012 First leg	Basel (Switzerland)	1–2	(Romania) CFR Cluj	Basel, Switzerland
20:45 CEST (UTC+2)	Streller 44'; Stocker (yellow card) 46'; Degen (yellow card) 52'; Dragović (yellow card) 78'; Frei (yellow card) 90+4'; Steinhöfer (yellow card) 90+4'	Report	Kapetanos (yellow card) 45+2'; Felgueiras (yellow card) 52'; Bastos (yellow card) 55'; Sougou 66', 71'; Saré (yellow card) 90+4'	Stadium: St. Jakob-Park; Attendance: 16,651; Referee: Jonas Eriksson (Sweden); Assistant referees: Mathias Klasenius (Sweden), Daniel Wärnmark (Sweden); Fourth official: Stefan Wittberg (Sweden); Goal-line assistants: Martin Strömbergsson (Sweden), Tobias Mattsson (Sweden)

29 August 2012 Second leg	CFR Cluj (Romania)	1–0 (3–1 agg.)	(Switzerland) Basel	Cluj-Napoca, Romania
21:45 EEST (UTC+3)	Kapetanos 20'; Felgueiras (yellow card) 42'; Valente (yellow card) 45'; Nicoară (yellow card) 90+2'	Report	Díaz (yellow card) 36'; Frei (penalty missed) 43'; Cabral (yellow card) 75'; Andrist (yellow card) 79'; Steinhöfer (yellow card) 90'	Stadium: Dr. Constantin Rădulescu Stadium; Attendance: 15,600; Referee: Gianluca Rocchi (Italy); Assistant referees: Elenito Di Liberator (Italy), Lorenzo Manganelli (Italy); Fourth official: Riccardo Di Fiore (Italy); Goal-line assistants: Mauro Bergonzi (Italy), Andrea De Marco (Italy)
Note: CFR Cluj won 3–1 on aggregate.

==== Group stage ====
Pos	Team	Pld	W	D	L	GF	GA	GD	Pts	Qualification	MUN	GAL	CLJ	BRA
1	(England) Manchester United	6	4	0	2	9	6	+3	12	Advance to knockout phase	—	1–0	0–1	3–2
2	(Turkey) Galatasaray	6	3	1	2	7	6	+1	10 (Note: Head-to-head points: Galatasaray 4, CFR Cluj 1.)	Advance to knockout phase	1–0	—	1–1	0–2
3	(Romania) CFR Cluj	6	3	1	2	9	7	+2	10	Transfer to Europa League	1–2	1–3	—	3–1
4	(Portugal) Braga	6	1	0	5	7	13	−6	3		1–3	1–2	0–2	—

Source: Soccerway
Notes:

19 September 2012 1	Braga (Portugal)	0–2	(Romania) CFR Cluj	Braga, Portugal
19:00 WEST (UTC+1)	Barbosa (yellow card) 82'	Report	Bastos 19', 34', (yellow card) 60'; Felgueiras (yellow card) 45+4'	Stadium: Estádio Municipal de Braga; Attendance: 10,922; Referee: Peter Rasmussen (Denmark); Assistant referees: Henrik Sønderby (Denmark), Lars Rix (Denmark); Fourth official: Lars Hummelgaard (Denmark); Goal-line assistants: Kenn Hansen (Denmark), Michael Tykgaard (Denmark)

2 October 2012 2	CFR Cluj (Romania)	1–2	(England) Manchester United	Cluj-Napoca, Romania
21:45 EEST (UTC+3)	Kapetanos 14'	Report	Van Persie 29', 49'; Ferdinand (yellow card) 86'	Stadium: Dr. Constantin Rădulescu Stadium; Attendance: 16,259; Referee: Alberto Undiano Mallenco (Spain); Assistant referees: Roberto del Palomar (Spain), Jesús Calvo Guadamuro (Spain); Fourth official: Juan Carlos Yuste (Spain); Goal-line assistants: Carlos Clos Gómez (Spain), Xavier Estrada Fernández (Spain)

23 October 2012 3	Galatasaray (Turkey)	1–1	(Romania) CFR Cluj	Istanbul, Turkey
21:45 EEST (UTC+3)	Bulut (yellow card) 14'; Amrabat (yellow card) 25'; Felipe Melo (yellow card) 31', (penalty missed) 35'; Sarıoğlu (yellow card) 73'; B. Yılmaz 77'	Report	Nounkeu 19' (o.g.); Aguirregaray (yellow card) 25' (yellow-red card) 28'; Bastos (yellow card) 37'	Stadium: Türk Telekom Arena; Attendance: 39,013; Referee: Paolo Tagliavento (Italy); Assistant referees: Mauro Tonolini (Italy), Lorenzo Manganelli (Italy); Fourth official: Andrea Stefani (Italy); Goal-line assistants: Luca Banti (Italy), Antonio Damato (Italy)

7 November 2012 4	CFR Cluj (Romania)	1–3	(Turkey) Galatasaray	Cluj-Napoca, Romania
21:45 EET (UTC+2)	Sougou (yellow card) 53'	Report	B. Yılmaz 18', 61', 74'; Riera (yellow card) 40'; Altıntop (yellow card) 48'	Stadium: Dr. Constantin Rădulescu Stadium; Attendance: 16,232; Referee: William Collum (Scotland); Assistant referees: William Conquer (Scotland), Martin Cryans (Scotland); Fourth official: Alan Mulvanny (Scotland); Goal-line assistants: Steven McLean (Scotland), John Beaton (Scotland)

20 November 2012 5	CFR Cluj (Romania)	3–1	(Portugal) Braga	Cluj-Napoca, Romania
21:45 EET (UTC+2)	Rui Pedro 7', 15', 33', (yellow card) 70'; Sougou (yellow card) 72'; Cadú (yellow card) 84'	Report	Alan 17'; Douglão (red card) 45+1'; Mossoró (yellow card) 88'	Stadium: Dr. Constantin Rădulescu Stadium; Attendance: 14,635; Referee: Sergei Karasev (Russia); Assistant referees: Nikolai Golubev (Russia), Tikhon Kalugin (Russia); Fourth official: Anton Averianov (Russia); Goal-line assistants: Aleksei Nikolaev (Russia), Maksim Layushkin (Russia)

5 December 2012 6	Manchester United (England)	0–1	(Romania) CFR Cluj	Manchester, England
19:45 GMT (UTC)	Scholes (yellow card) 90'	Report	Cadú (yellow card) 49'; Luís Alberto 56'; Felgueiras (yellow card) 90+3'	Stadium: Old Trafford; Attendance: 71,521; Referee: Daniele Orsato (Italy); Assistant referees: Mauro Tonolini (Italy), Massimiliano Grilli (Italy); Fourth official: Lorenzo Manganelli (Italy); Goal-line assistants: Andrea De Marco (Italy), Mauro Bergonzi (Italy)

=== UEFA Europa League ===
==== Knockout phase ====
===== Round of 32 =====
14 February 2013 First leg	Internazionale (Italy)	2–0	(Romania) CFR Cluj	Milan, Italy
21:05 CET (UTC+1)	Palacio 20', 87'; Pereira (yellow card) 32'; Silvestre (yellow card) 70'	Report	Maah (yellow card) 67'; Mureșan (yellow card) 82'; Bjelanović (yellow card) 89'	Stadium: San Siro; Attendance: 14,790; Referee: Michael Koukoulakis (Greece); Assistant referees: Dimitrios Saraidaris (Greece), Damianos Efthimiadis (Greece); Fourth official: Christos Baltas (Greece); Goal-line assistants: Stavros Tritsonis (Greece), Anastasios Kakos (Greece)

21 February 2013 Second leg	CFR Cluj (Romania)	0–3 (0–5 agg.)	(Italy) Internazionale	Cluj-Napoca, Romania
20:00 EET (UTC+2)	Kapetanos (yellow card) 38'; Camora (red card) 80'; Cadú (yellow card) 84'	Report	Kovačić (yellow card) 15'; Guarín 22', 45+2'; Benassi 78'	Stadium: Dr. Constantin Rădulescu Stadium; Attendance: 11,027; Referee: Paweł Gil (Poland); Assistant referees: Piotr Sadczuk (Poland), Maciej Wierzbowski (Poland); Fourth official: Konrad Sapela (Poland); Goal-line assistants: Robert Małek (Poland), Hubert Siejewicz (Poland)
Note: Internazionale won 5–0 on aggregate.
