= Mário Felgueiras =

Portuguese footballer (born 1986)

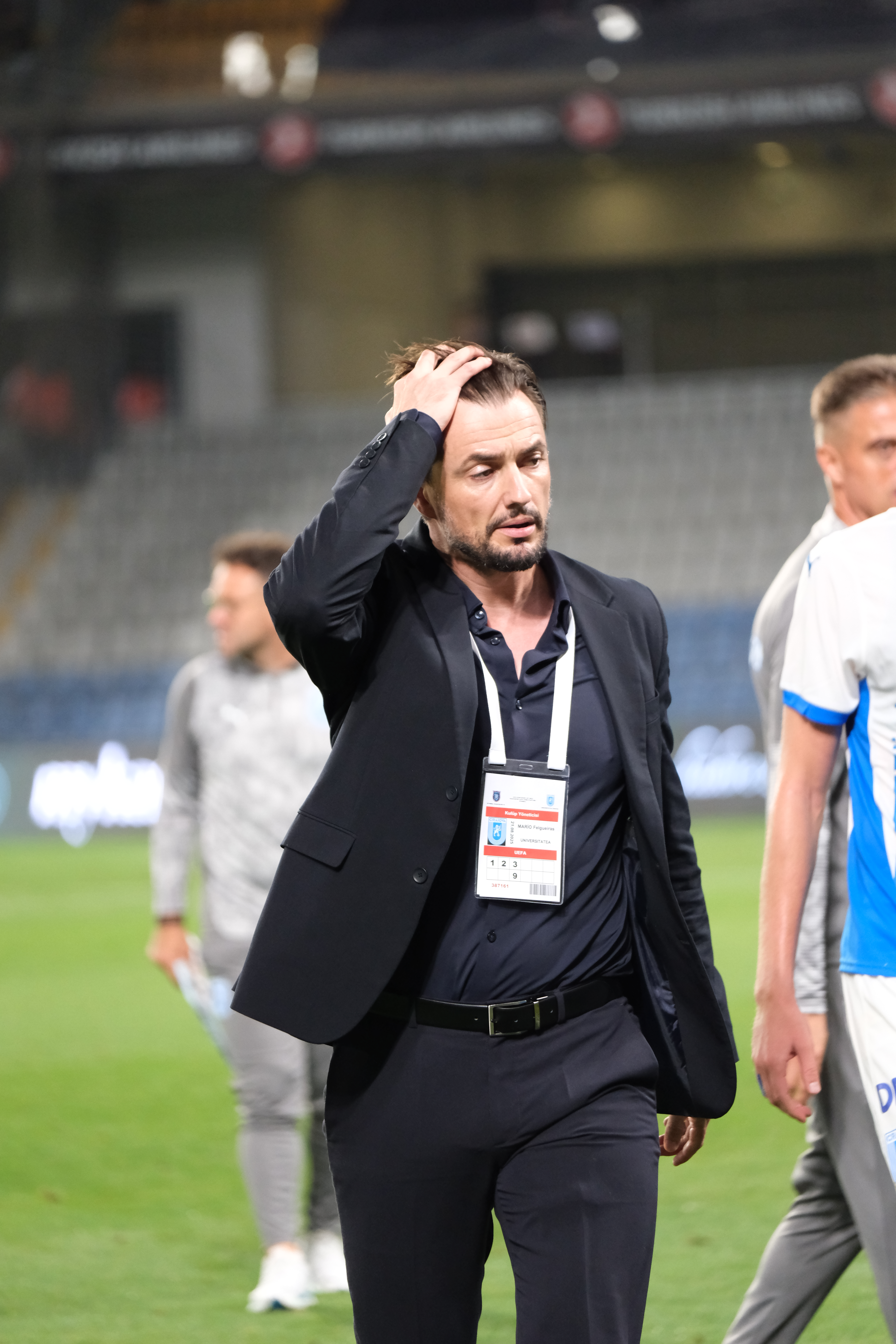
- Felgueiras sporting director of U Craiova in 2025

Personal information
- Full name: Mário Jorge Quintas Felgueiras
- Date of birth: 12 December 1986 (age 39)
- Place of birth: Viana do Castelo, Portugal
- Height: 1.86 m (6 ft 1 in)
- Position: Goalkeeper

Team information
- Current team: Universitatea Craiova (sporting director)

Youth career
- 1996–2002: Vianense
- 2002–2005: Sporting CP

Senior career*
Years	Team	Apps	(Gls)
2005–2007	Sporting CP	0	(0)
2005–2007	→ Espinho (loan)	31	(0)
2007–2008	Portimonense	26	(0)
2008–2012	Braga	1	(0)
2009–2010	→ Vitória Setúbal (loan)	14	(0)
2010–2011	→ Rio Ave (loan)	8	(0)
2011–2012	→ FC Brașov (loan)	34	(0)
2012–2015	CFR Cluj	77	(0)
2015–2016	Konyaspor	0	(0)
2016–2018	Paços Ferreira	27	(0)
2018–2019	Anorthosis	0	(0)
2019	Espinho	0	(0)
Total		218	(0)

International career
2001–2002	Portugal U16	5	(0)
2002–2003	Portugal U17	14	(0)
2004	Portugal U18	2	(0)
2004–2005	Portugal U19	8	(0)
2005–2007	Portugal U20	12	(0)
2005–2008	Portugal U21	1	(0)

Managerial career
- 2024–: Universitatea Craiova (sporting director)
Medal record
Men's football
Representing Portugal
UEFA European U17 Championship
Winner	2003 Portugal
Toulon Tournament
Bronze medal – third place	2006
- * Club domestic league appearances and goals

Mário Jorge Quintas Felgueiras (born 12 December 1986) is a Portuguese former professional footballer who played as a goalkeeper, currently sporting director at Liga I club U Craiova.

He started playing for Sporting, Portimonense and Braga, being successively loaned by the first and third clubs and only totalling one Primeira Liga appearance for them. From 2011 until 2015 he competed in Romania, mainly with CFR Cluj.

Felgueiras won 42 caps for Portugal at youth level.

== Club career ==
=== Sporting and Portimonense ===
Born in Viana do Castelo, Felgueiras joined Sporting CP's youth system in 2002 at the age of 15, from local SC Vianense. In early 2003, following an injury to regular starter Nélson Pereira, he was called to the first team for training, but he only managed to be called up for a competitive game during his tenure, remaining an unused substitute against Gil Vicente F.C. on 29 August 2004.

In summer 2005, Felgueiras was loaned to S.C. Espinho in the third division for two years, being first choice in his second season. Subsequently, he was released by the Lisbon side, signing a two-year contract with Portimonense S.C. in the Segunda Liga. He kept consecutive clean sheets in his first two official matches with his new club.

=== Braga ===
For the 2008–09 campaign, Felgueiras returned to the Primeira Liga, joining S.C. Braga as a free agent on a 4+1 deal. He only appeared in one game in his first year, ten minutes of a 1–1 draw at league champions FC Porto in the last matchday.

In 2009–10, Felgueiras was loaned to another top flight club, Vitória de Setúbal. In July 2010 he returned to Braga, appearing in both legs of the 4–2 aggregate win against Celtic in the third qualifying round of the UEFA Champions League. However, he was soon deemed surplus to requirements and made way for another Brazilian (Felipe, the 17th in the squad), leaving for Rio Ave F.C. until the end of the season– his official debut came in the league opener, a 0–1 home loss against C.D. Nacional.

=== Romania ===
Felgueiras was loaned by Braga to Romanian club FC Brașov for the 2011–12 campaign. The following year, after cutting all ties with the former, he agreed to a four-year contract with CFR Cluj also in Liga I, making his debut in the competition with his new team on 5 August in 3–0 home victory over FC Vaslui.

On 19 September 2012, Felgueiras put on a Player of the match performance against former side Braga, in a 2–0 Champions League group stage away win, being subsequently selected for the Team of the Round. In the same competition, he was also in goal to help to a 1–0 defeat of Manchester United at Old Trafford, being subsequently linked to Premier League's Everton as a backup to Tim Howard and commenting: "Any player would be interested in playing in the Premier League. I am very happy to hear about Everton's interest, but I will only think about leaving at the end of the season"; he also claimed that Portugal manager Paulo Bento "has been paying attention" to his performance, and that Sporting and S.L. Benfica had reportedly shown interest in acquiring his services.

Felgueiras received the first red card of his Romanian career (second overall) on 27 July 2013, in a 2–2 home draw against ACS Poli Timișoara. In November, as Cluj was facing a financial crisis, he and other players boycotted a league match; in total, he appeared in 100 games for the club in all competitions.

=== Konyaspor ===
On 2 February 2015, Felgueiras signed for Turkey's Konyaspor for three and a half years and €800.000. He made his debut ten days later, in a cup match against Galatasaray SK which ended with a 4–1 away loss.

=== Later years ===
Felgueiras returned to Portugal on 1 February 2016, joining F.C. Paços de Ferreira until 30 June 2017. He made 20 appearances in 2017–18, in a top-flight relegation.

After an unassuming spell in the Cypriot First Division with Anorthosis Famagusta F.C., Felgueiras returned to his homeland and signed with his former club Espinho at the end of August 2019. However, two weeks later, the 32-year-old announced that he was retiring from football for personal reasons.

== International career ==
On 8 February 2005, still a junior, Felgueiras made his first and only appearance for the Portugal under-21 team, playing 13 minutes in a 2–0 friendly win over the Republic of Ireland.

== Club statistics ==
Club	Season	League			Cup		Continental		Total	
Club	Season	Division	Apps	Goals	Apps	Goals	Apps	Goals	Apps	Goals
Sporting CP	2004–05	Primeira Liga	0	0	0	0	0	0	0	0
Espinho (loan)	2005–06	Segunda Divisão	5	0	0	0	—		5	0
Espinho (loan)	2006–07	Segunda Divisão	26	0	1	0	—		27	0
Espinho (loan)	Total		31	0	1	0	—		32	0
Portimonense	2007–08	Liga de Honra	26	0	3 (Note: Two appearances in Taça de Portugal, one appearance in Taça da Liga)	0	—		29	0
Braga	2008–09	Primeira Liga	1	0	0	0	0	0	1	0
Braga	2010–11	Primeira Liga	—		—		2 (Note: Appearances in UEFA Champions League)	0	2	0
Braga	Total		1	0	0	0	2	0	3	0
Vitória Setúbal (loan)	2009–10	Primeira Liga	14	0	3 (Note: Two appearances in Taça de Portugal, one appearance in Taça da Liga)	0	—		17	0
Rio Ave (loan)	2010–11	Primeira Liga	8	0	3 (Note: One appearance in Taça de Portugal, two appearances in Taça da Liga)	0	—		11	0
FC Brașov (loan)	2011–12	Liga I	34	0	2	0	—		36	0
CFR Cluj	2012–13	Liga I	28	0	5	0	12 (Note: Ten appearances in UEFA Champions League and two in UEFA Europa League)	0	45	0
CFR Cluj	2013–14	Liga I	32	0	1	0	—		33	0
CFR Cluj	2014–15	Liga I	17	0	3	0	4 (Note: Appearances in UEFA Europa League)	0	24	0
CFR Cluj	Total		77	0	9	0	16	0	102	0
Konyaspor	2014–15	Süper Lig	0	0	1	0	—		1	0
Konyaspor	2015–16	Süper Lig	0	0	2	0	—		2	0
Konyaspor	Total		0	0	3	0	—		3	0
Paços Ferreira	2015–16	Primeira Liga	0	0	—		—		0	0
Paços Ferreira	2016–17	Primeira Liga	7	0	3 (Note: Appearances in Taça da Liga)	0	—		10	0
Paços Ferreira	2017–18	Primeira Liga	20	0	2	0	—		22	0
Paços Ferreira	Total		27	0	5	0	—		32	0
Anorthosis	2018–19	Cypriot First Division	0	0	0	0	2	0	2	0
Career total			218	0	29	0	20	0	267	0

== Honours ==
Braga

- UEFA Intertoto Cup: 2008

CFR Cluj

- Cupa României runner-up: 2012–13
- Supercupa României runner-up: 2012

Portugal U17

- UEFA European Under-17 Championship: 2003

Portugal U20

- Toulon Tournament third place: 2006
