= 2006 Toulon Tournament =

Tournament details
- Host country: France
- Dates: 15–24 May
- Teams: 8 (from 3 confederations)

Final positions
- Champions: France
- Runners-up: Netherlands
- Third place: Portugal
- Fourth place: China

Tournament statistics
- Matches played: 18
- Top scorer(s): (France) David Gigliotti (3 goals)
- Best player: (France) Ricardo Faty

The 2006 Toulon Tournament was the 34th edition of the Toulon Tournament, and was held from 15 May to 24 May. It was won by France, after they beat Netherlands in the final.

== Results ==
=== Group A ===
Pos	Team	Pld	W	D	L	GF	GA	GD	Pts	Qualification
1	Portugal	3	1	2	0	2	0	+2	5	Advance to Semi-final
2	China	3	1	2	0	1	0	+1	5	Advance to Semi-final
3	Argentina	3	1	1	1	2	1	+1	4	
4	Czech Republic	3	0	1	2	0	4	−4	1	

Updated to match(es) played on 11 June 2015. Source: RSSSF
15 May 2006

China	0–0	Czech Republic

Stade Mayol, Toulon
15 May 2006

Argentina	0–0	Portugal

Stade Mayol, Toulon

17 May 2006

Argentina	0–1	China
		Chen Tao 46'

Stade Perruc, Hyères
17 May 2006

Portugal	2–0	Czech Republic
Moreira 30'; Vilela 80+2'

Stade Perruc, Hyères

19 May 2006

Argentina	2–0	Czech Republic
Caraccio 43'; Cahais 62'

Stade de Lattre, Aubagne
19 May 2006

China	0–0	Portugal

Stade Vitria, La Londe-les-Maures

=== Group B ===
Pos	Team	Pld	W	D	L	GF	GA	GD	Pts	Qualification
1	France (H)	3	1	2	0	5	3	+2	5	Advance to Semi-final
2	Netherlands	3	1	2	0	2	1	+1	5	Advance to Semi-final
3	Mexico	3	0	2	1	2	3	−1	2	
4	Colombia	3	0	2	1	2	4	−2	2	

Updated to match(es) played on 11 June 2015. Source: RSSSF
(H) Hosts
16 May 2006

Colombia	0–0	Netherlands

Stade Mayol, Toulon
16 May 2006

France	1–1	Mexico
Carlier 58' (pen.)		Maya 80+3'

Stade Mayol, Toulon

18 May 2006

Mexico	1–1	Colombia
Hernández 49'		Carrillo 70'

Stade Perruc, Hyeres
18 May 2006

France	1–1	Netherlands
Gigliotti 18'		Agustien 73'

Stade Perruc, Hyères

20 May 2006

France	3–1	Colombia
Carlier 23'; Rippert 71'; Gigliotti 80+3'		Carrillo 38'

Stade de Lattre, Aubagne
20 May 2006

Mexico	0–1	Netherlands
		Janssen 26' (pen.)

Stade Vitria, La Londe-les-Maures

=== Semi-finals ===
22 May 2006

Portugal	0–1	Netherlands
		Bakkal 73'

Stade Mayol, Toulon

22 May 2006

France	2–0	China
Cabaye 70'; Gigliotti 80+1'

Stade Mayol, Toulon

=== Third place match ===
24 May 2006

Portugal	1–0	China
Moreira 66'

Stade Mayol, Toulon

=== Final ===
24 May 2006

France	0–0 (a.e.t.)	Netherlands
Penalties
Belgazhouali (penalty scored); Faty (penalty scored); Carlier (penalty scored); Moutaouakil (penalty scored); Cabaye (penalty scored)	5–3	(penalty scored) Sarpong; (penalty scored) Agustien; (penalty scored) Drenthe; (penalty missed) Janssen

Stade Mayol, Toulon
