= Viorel Nicoară =

Romanian footballer

Personal information
- Date of birth: 27 September 1987 (age 39)
- Place of birth: Bucharest, Romania
- Height: 1.78 m (5 ft 10 in)
- Position: Left midfielder

Youth career
- 1996–2002: Termo RADET București
- 2002–2005: LPS "Sfântul Pantelimon"
- 2005–2006: Unirea Urziceni
- 2006–2007: Râmnicu Sărat

Senior career*
| Years | Team | Apps | (Gls) |
| 2007–2008 | Râmnicu Sărat | 13 | (1) |
| 2008–2010 | Victoria Brăneşti | 55 | (11) |
| 2011–2013 | CFR Cluj | 33 | (1) |
| 2013 | → Pandurii Târgu Jiu (loan) | 12 | (2) |
| 2013–2016 | Pandurii Târgu Jiu | 83 | (5) |
| 2016 | Maccabi Petah Tikva | 0 | (0) |
| 2016–2018 | Astra Giurgiu | 22 | (1) |
| 2018 | → Juventus București (loan) | 13 | (0) |
| 2018 | Energeticianul | 7 | (1) |
| 2019 | Sportul Snagov | 6 | (0) |
| Total | | 245 | (23) |

International career
| 2011 | Romania | 1 | (0) |
- * Club domestic league appearances and goals as of 1 June 2019

Viorel Nicoară (born 27 September 1987) is a Romanian footballer who plays as a midfielder.

== Career ==
Viorel Nicoară, a product of Unirea Urziceni academy, started his senior career at Tineretului Stadium, but he failed to make a single appearance. He was loaned to CSM Râmnicu Sărat, and in 2008 sold to Victoria Brăneşti.

He won the promotion to Liga I with Victoria Brăneşti at his team's first Liga II season. During the 2009–10 season, he was called by the Romania national football team coach Răzvan Lucescu to the under-23 squad, alongside his team-mate Vasile Olariu.

He made his debut with the full Romanian team in August 2011, playing the last seven minutes of a friendly match against San Marino.

== Honours ==
=== CFR Cluj ===
- Liga I winner (2011–12)

=== Pandurii Târgu Jiu ===
- Liga I runner-up (2012–13)

=== Victoria Brăneşti ===
- Liga II winner (2009–10)
