= Robert Maah =

French professional footballer (born 1985)

Personal information
- Full name: Emmanuel Robert Maah
- Date of birth: February 25, 1985 (age 41)
- Place of birth: Paris, France
- Height: 1.79 m (5 ft 10 in)
- Positions: Winger; forward

Youth career
- 2003–2004: Laval
- 2004–2005: Faenza

Senior career*
Years	Team	Apps	(Gls)
2005–2006	Bari	9	(1)
2006	→ Ravenna (loan)	10	(1)
2006–2008	Pro Sesto	53	(16)
2009	Grosseto	4	(0)
2009	Mouscron	12	(2)
2010–2011	Como	33	(8)
2011–2012	Cittadella	48	(9)
2013–2014	CFR Cluj	30	(8)
2014–2015	Orleans	32	(7)
2015–2016	Göztepe	20	(0)
2016–2017	Gazélec Ajaccio	32	(7)
2018–2019	Boulogne	27	(14)
2019–2020	Laval	22	(3)
2020–2021	Pétange	9	(4)
- * Club domestic league appearances and goals

Emmanuel Robert Maah (born 25 March 1985) is a retired French professional footballer. Although he can play as a centre forward, he is usually deployed as a winger.

== Career ==
Maah was born in Paris, and began his training with Stade Lavallois. He started his senior career in Italy with A.S. Bari in 2005, and spent the next years with various clubs in Serie B and Lega Pro, with a short spell in Belgium with R.E. Mouscron. In September 2010, Maah signed a one-year contract with Como. In July 2011 he left for Cittadella.

In January 2013, CFR Cluj signed Maah from Cittadella for a reported fee of €700,000. In July 2014 he signed a two-year contract with US Orléans. He left after the first season, when Orléans were relegated, and was reported to be a target of RC Lens, AJ Auxerre and AC Ajaccio. However, within a week he had signed a two-year deal with Turkish side Göztepe S.K.

In August 2016, Maah signed for Gazélec Ajaccio on a two-year deal with the option for a further year. However, in October 2017 he was sacked by the club for serious misconduct. He signed for US Boulogne in August 2018 for one season. After being second highest scorer in the 2018–19 Championnat National he left Boulogne and signed for the club he started with, Stade Lavallois, in July 2019.

Released by Laval at the end of the 2019–20 season, Maah joined Luxembourg side Union Titus Pétange in June 2020.
