= Armando Carrillo =

Colombian footballer (born 1985)

Personal information
- Full name: Armando Jose Carrillo Dangond
- Date of birth: November 3, 1985 (age 40)
- Place of birth: Valledupar, Colombia
- Height: 1.72 m (5 ft 8 in)
- Position: Winger

Team information
- Current team: Boyacá Chicó
- Number: 11

Youth career
- Deportivo Cali

Senior career*
Years	Team	Apps	(Gls)
2002–2011	Deportivo Cali		
2004	→ Atlético Huila (loan)		
2005	→ Atlético Bucaramanga (loan)		
2009	→ Atlético Nacional (loan)	5	(0)
2010	→ Deportes Tolima (loan)	8	(0)
2011	→ Envigado (loan)	25	(6)
2012	Atlético Huila	22	(1)
2013	Atlético Bucaramanga	18	(1)
2014–	Boyacá Chicó		
- * Club domestic league appearances and goals as of 21 January 2014

Armando La Perra Carrillo (born November 3, 1985) is a Colombian footballer that plays as a striker for Boyacá Chicó.

== Honors ==
- Champion with the Club of the National Loperena College of the valley of Upar in all categories of play
- A league title
- Champion in the Afisa Cup
- Champion of the Stars of the Future Tournament
- Champion in the Mustang II Cup of 2005
- Subchampion in the Mustang I Cup of 2006
- Champion with Colombia Sub-21 Selection in the Central American Games and of the Caribbean
