= Florin Țîrcă =

Romanian footballer

Florin Țârcă
Personal information
- Full name: Florin Ionel Țârcă
- Date of birth: 1 February 1984 (age 42)
- Place of birth: Bistrița, Romania
- Height: 1.72 m (5 ft 8 in)
- Position: Full-back

Youth career
- Gloria Bistrița

Senior career*
Years	Team	Apps	(Gls)
2003–2006	Gloria II Bistrița		
2006	Gloria Bistrița	1	(0)
2007–2010	Bihor Oradea	90	(0)
2010–2012	Arieșul Turda	34	(0)
2012–2014	Gloria Bistrița	58	(0)
- * Club domestic league appearances and goals

Florin Ionel Țîrcă (born 1 February 1984) is a Romanian former footballer who played as a full-back. He is the product of Gloria Bistrița football academy. His best period as a player was at Bihor Oradea, where he played nearly 100 matches and for a while was also the team captain.
