= Ronny (footballer, born 1983) =

Brazilian footballer

Personal information
- Full name: Ronny Carlos da Silva Letieres
- Date of birth: 25 February 1983 (age 43)
- Place of birth: Itabuna, Brazil
- Height: 1.83 m (6 ft 0 in)
- Position: Striker

Senior career*
Years	Team	Apps	(Gls)
2003–2004	América de Natal	10	(8)
2004	Criciúma	32	(24)
2004–2005	Zürich	33	(23)
2005–2006	Paços de Ferreira	10	(3)
2006–2007	Shanghai Shenhua	15	(7)
2007–2009	Shaanxi Chanba	38	(8)
2009–2010	América de Natal	30	(25)
2010–2011	Beira-Mar	12	(5)
2011	Guangdong Sunray Cave	5	(1)
2011–2014	CFR Cluj	33	(7)
2013–2014	→ Rio Ave (loan)	1	(0)
2016	Comercial	14	(8)
2017	Sertãozinho	10	(2)
Total		219	(121)
- * Club domestic league appearances and goals

Ronny Carlos da Silva Letieres (born 25 February 1983), known as just Ronny, is a Brazilian former footballer.

Influenced in his youth by his father, a fanatic supporter of Bahia, Ronny followed the campaign that led to the club's second national title in 1989. He was an admirer of strikers Bobô and Charles, along with midfielders Paulo Rodrigues and Carlos. In spite of Bobô being the great idol of the fans, Ronny identified most strongly with Charles because of his many goals.

When Ronny was 15 the family moved to the state of Rio Grande do Norte when his father received a promotion. There, Ronny auditioned for various clubs such as Baraúnas and ABC (RN), and was accepted for the ABC squad, where he played in their youth system until he was 19. At 20 he was promoted to the first team and began training with the professionals after impressing in the Premier League U-20 and BH Cup tournaments, being top scorer in both competitions. After a good showing in the Brazilian Championship Series B in 2003, especially in the match between ABC (RN) and Clube de Regatas Brasil, he was transferred to Criciúma Esporte Clube. He soon got the opportunity to play for FC Zürich in Switzerland, where he had a great season, with 23 goals in 33 games. He was next transferred to F.C. Paços de Ferreira of Portugal. Constantly subject to various injuries, he played only 10 matches and scored just 3 goals.

== Honours ==
CFR Cluj

- Liga I: 2011–12
