= Weldon (footballer) =

Brazilian footballer

Personal information
- Full name: Weldon Santos de Andrade
- Date of birth: 6 August 1980 (age 46)
- Place of birth: Santo André, Brazil
- Height: 1.84 m (6 ft 1/2 in)
- Position: Striker

Youth career
- 1998: Guarani
- 1999: América-SP
- 2000: Santos

Senior career*
| Years | Team | Apps | (Gls) |
| 1999 | América-SP | | |
| 2000–2003 | Santos | 11 | (1) |
| 2001–2002 | → Brasiliense (loan) | 48 | (22) |
| 2003 | → Sport Recife (loan) | 47 | (11) |
| 2004 | Ponte Preta | 34 | (10) |
| 2004–2005 | Al Nassr | 36 | (9) |
| 2005–2009 | Cruzeiro | 27 | (5) |
| 2006 | → Sochaux (loan) | 12 | (2) |
| 2006 | → Troyes (loan) | 3 | (0) |
| 2007 | → Sport Recife (loan) | 34 | (6) |
| 2007–2008 | → Belenenses (loan) | 27 | (13) |
| 2009 | → Sport Recife (loan) | 14 | (6) |
| 2009–2011 | Benfica | 16 | (5) |
| 2011–2013 | CFR Cluj | 24 | (9) |
| 2012 | → Changchun Yatai (loan) | 21 | (6) |
| 2013–2014 | Criciúma | 2 | (0) |
| 2014 | Anápolis | 8 | (0) |
| 2014–2015 | Olhanense | 22 | (2) |
| 2016 | Brasiliense | 3 | (1) |
| 2017 | Independente de Limeira | 9 | (4) |
| 2017 | Desportiva Ferroviária | 8 | (0) |
| 2017 | Taboão da Serra | 0 | (0) |
| 2018 | Juventus-SP | 8 | (0) |
| 2019 | Batatais | 0 | (0) |
| 2020 | Santos-AP | 8 | (1) |
| Total | | 422 | (113) |
- * Club domestic league appearances and goals

Weldon Santos de Andrade (born 6 August 1980), known simply as Weldon, is a Brazilian retired footballer who played as a striker.

== Club career ==
Weldon was born in Santo André, São Paulo. In his early career, he represented four clubs in quick succession: Santos FC, Brasiliense Futebol Clube, Sport Club do Recife and Associação Atlética Ponte Preta, before moving abroad in 2004 with Al Nassr FC of Saudi Arabia.

In the following year, Weldon signed for Cruzeiro Esporte Clube. He went on to be loaned several times for the duration of his contract, including twice in the French Ligue 1, with FC Sochaux-Montbéliard and Troyes AC, where the player was rarely used – only ten games and one goal in two season halves combined.

After an aborted move to Botafogo de Futebol e Regatas, Weldon agreed to a two-year deal at S.L. Benfica of Portugal (he had already played in the country the previous year, with C.F. Os Belenenses) on 22 July 2009. He made his official debut on 16 August, rescuing a point at home against C.S. Marítimo for the season's opener (1–1); during the team's victorious campaign he served almost exclusively as backup to Óscar Cardozo and Javier Saviola, but made the most of his minutes, for instance scoring twice in a 4–2 win at Associação Naval 1º de Maio on 5 April 2010 and adding another brace in another away triumph (3–2 against Académica de Coimbra).

Weldon only appeared in eight official matches in 2010–11, four in the league, totalling less than 100 minutes overall. In the following years he played in Romania and China, returning to his homeland at the age of 33 and continuing his career mainly in the lower leagues and amateur football; this was interspersed with a spell in the Portuguese Segunda Liga, with S.C. Olhanense.

== Honours ==
Sport Recife

- Campeonato Pernambucano: 2003, 2007, 2009

Benfica

- Primeira Liga: 2009–10
- Taça da Liga: 2009–10, 2010–11

CFR Cluj

- Liga I: 2011–12
