= Dan Săndulescu =

Romanian footballer

Personal information
- Date of birth: 1 April 1985 (age 41)
- Place of birth: Pitești, Romania
- Height: 1.85 m (6 ft 1 in)
- Positions: Centre back; defensive midfielder

Team information
- Current team: Moscardó

Youth career
- 1995–2004: FC Argeș Pitești

Senior career*
Years	Team	Apps	(Gls)
2004	CS Mioveni	2	(0)
2005	FC Olt	9	(1)
2005–2006	CS Juventus București	11	(1)
2005–2006	Callatis	5	(0)
2006–2007	Baia Mare	18	(2)
2007–2009	FC Bihor	29	(0)
2009–2012	CS Mioveni	84	(5)
2012–2013	FC Olt Slatina	8	(1)
2013–2014	Universitatea Cluj	2	(0)
2014–2015	Rapid București	21	(0)
2015	SCM Pitești	8	(0)
2016–2022	Moscardó	97	(6)
Total		294	(16)
- * Club domestic league appearances and goals as of 1 May 2017

Dan Săndulescu (born 1 April 1985) is a Romanian footballer. He is currently playing for Moscardó.
