= Rudy Carlier =

French footballer (born 1986)

Personal information
- Full name: Rudy Marc Eric Carlier
- Date of birth: 19 January 1986 (age 40)
- Place of birth: Saint-Quentin, France
- Height: 1.81 m (5 ft 11 in)
- Position: Forward

Youth career
- 2000–2001: Olympique Saint-Quentin
- 2001–2003: Cannes

Senior career*
Years	Team	Apps	(Gls)
2003–2009	Strasbourg B	46	(17)
2004–2009	Strasbourg	29	(4)
2007	→ Gueugnon (loan)	6	(1)
2007–2008	→ Clermont Foot (loan)	22	(3)
2008	→ Racing Ferrol (loan)	19	(3)
2009	Eibar	11	(1)
2009–2010	Racing Ferrol	29	(8)
2010–2011	Créteil	24	(1)
2012	Rouen	7	(0)
2013–2014	SVN Zweibrücken	26	(3)
2014–2015	Eintracht Trier	29	(6)
2015–2016	SC Schiltigheim	32	(6)
2016–2017	ASC Biesheim	10	(2)
Total		290	(55)

International career
2002	France U16	10	(4)
	France U17	7	(2)
	France U18	13	(2)
2004	France U19	1	(0)
	France U20	10	(4)

Managerial career
- 2024–2025: USL Dunkerque Youth
- * Club domestic league appearances and goals

Rudy Marc Eric Carlier (born 19 January 1986) is a French football manager and former footballer who played as a forward. He last managed the youth team of USL Dunkerque.

== Club career ==
=== Strasbourg ===
Carlier played for the youth teams at Olympique Saint-Quentin and Cannes before joining Strasbourg in 2003 and initially playing for the B team, scoring 17 goals in 44 appearances for Strasbourg B across 2003 to 2005 while making a further two appearances in 2008–09.

He made his debut for Strasbourg on 30 October 2004 during the 1–0 loss against Lyon and won the 2004–05 Coupe de la Ligue in his first season with the club.

He scored his first goal for Strasbourg during the 2–2 draw against Basel in the UEFA Cup round of 16 on 16 March 2005. He scored his first Ligue 1 goal in the 2–2 draw against Marseille on 6 May 2006.

His last match for Strasbourg came on 17 January 2009 during the 0–0 draw against Dijon.

==== Loans to Gueugnon, Clermont Foot, and Racing Ferrol ====
He joined Gueugnon on loan for the first half of the 2006–07 Ligue 2 season, debuting during the 1–0 loss against Metz on 29 July 2006. His only goal for Gueugnon came on 29 September 2006 during the 6–1 loss against Le Havre.

He then joined Clermont Foot on loan in January 2007. He debuted during the 1–0 win against Brest on 17 August 2007 and scored his first goal during the 3–0 win against Dijon on 21 September 2007. He won the 2006–07 Championnat National with Clermont Foot.

Carlier then joined Racing Ferrol on loan for the end of the 2007–08 season. He debuted on 9 February 2008 during the 2–0 win against Polideportivo Ejido, and scored his first goal on 17 February 2008 against Elche.

=== Eibar and second spell at Racing Ferrol ===
Carlier joined Eibar from Strasbourg on 1 February 2009 on a five-month deal with the club. He debuted on 14 February 2009 during the 2–0 win against Huesca and he scored his only goal for the club in the next match against Celta Vigo.

He then rejoined Racing Ferrol for the 2009–10 season after the club was relegated to the Segunda División B.

=== Creteil and Rouen ===
He joined Creteil on a one-year deal on 30 July 2010. He debuted against his former club Gueugnon on 13 August 2010 and scored his only goal for Creteil on 9 April 2011 during the 1–0 victory against Bayonne.

After a year away from football, he joined Rouen on a six-month deal on 27 January 2012. He debuted on 27 February 2012 during the 2–1 loss against Paris and he never scored for Rouen.

=== Regionalliga Südwest ===
Carlier then joined Regionalliga Südwest club SVN Zweibrücken on 24 July 2013. He debuted during the 1–0 win against SSV Ulm on 3 August 2013 and he was sidelined after returning too early from an injury in September 2013. He then scored in three consecutive matches against Pfullendorf, TuS Koblenz, and Eintracht Frankfurt II in March and April 2014 and finished as runners-up in the 2014 Southwestern Cup final.

He joined Eintracht Trier on a one-year deal on 1 July 2014. He debuted against SpVgg Neckarelz on 2 August 2014 and scored his first goal during the 2–0 win against Homburg on 10 August 2014.

He also appeared in the DFB-Pokal for Eintracht Trier on 17 August 2014 during the 2–0 loss against Bundesliga club Freiburg.

=== Schiltigheim and Biesheim ===
He joined Schiltigheim on 12 October 2015.

He joined ASC Biesheim on 10 August 2016 and retired on 1 July 2017 at the age of 31.

== International career ==
Carlier represented France at various youth levels between U16 and U20.

== Managerial career ==
Between July 2024 and June 2025, he managed the youth team at USL Dunkerque after previously being the assistant manager since July 2022.

== Honours ==
Strasbourg

- Coupe de la Ligue: 2004–05

Clermont Foot

- Championnat National: 2006–07

SVN Zweibrücken

- Southwestern Cup: runner-up 2014
