= Nuno Diogo =

Portuguese footballer

Personal information
- Full name: Nuno Miguel Pereira Diogo
- Date of birth: 13 June 1981 (age 45)
- Place of birth: Lisbon, Portugal
- Height: 1.90 m (6 ft 3 in)
- Position: Centre-back

Youth career
- 1991–2000: Sporting CP

Senior career*
Years	Team	Apps	(Gls)
2000–2002	Sporting CP B	53	(3)
2002–2003	Leça	32	(1)
2003–2004	Salgueiros	28	(0)
2004–2007	Penafiel	51	(2)
2007–2008	Leixões	16	(1)
2008–2009	Otopeni	27	(2)
2009–2010	Braşov	24	(2)
2010–2013	CFR Cluj	31	(1)
2014−2015	Olhanense	33	(0)
2015−2016	Feirense	30	(1)
2016–2018	Famalicão	40	(3)
Total		365	(16)
- * Club domestic league appearances and goals

Nuno Miguel Pereira Diogo (Note: This name uses Portuguese naming customs: the first or maternal family name is Pereira and the second or paternal family name is Diogo.) (born 13 June 1981 in Lisbon) is a Portuguese former professional footballer who played as a central defender.

== Honours ==
CFR Cluj

- Liga I: 2011–12
