= 2011–12 Liga I =

94th season of top-tier football league in Romania

Liga I
- Season: 2011–12
- Champions: CFR Cluj
- Relegated: Târgu Mureș; Voința Sibiu; Sportul Studențesc; Mioveni
- Champions League: CFR Cluj; Vaslui
- Europa League: Dinamo București; Steaua București; Rapid București
- Matches: 305
- Goals: 748 (2.45 per match)
- Top goalscorer: Wesley Lopes (27)
- Biggest home win: CFR 6–1 Sportul
- Biggest away win: Gaz Metan 0–5 Dinamo; Mioveni 0–5 Vaslui; Ceahlăul 0–5 Dinamo; CFR 0–5 Rapid; Mioveni 0–5 CFR
- Highest scoring: Rapid 5–3 Gaz Metan
- Longest winning run: Vaslui (9)
- Longest unbeaten run: Rapid (12)
- Longest losing run: Mioveni (10)
- Highest attendance: Steaua 3–2 Dinamo (47,698)
- Average attendance: 4,855

The 2011–12 Liga I was the ninety-fourth season of Liga I, the top-level football league of Romania. It began on 22 July 2011 and ended on 19 May 2012. The defending champions are Oțelul Galați.

Since Romania dropped from eighth to fourteenth place in the UEFA association coefficient rankings at the end of the 2010–11 season, the league has lost its UEFA Europa League playoff round berth. Further, the champions will not directly be entered into the group stage of the UEFA Champions League any more, but rather have to begin in the third qualification round.

== Teams ==
The league was originally expected to comprise eighteen teams, fourteen teams from the 2010–11 season and four teams eligible for promotion from the 2010–11 Liga II. However, the exact composition of the league was further affected by the licensing controversies, see below.

Four teams from the 2010–11 season were relegated to their respective 2011–12 Liga II division; these teams are Universitatea Craiova, Unirea Urziceni, Victoria Brănești and Sportul Studențesc. Unirea Urziceni were relegated just two seasons after they won the 2008–09 Liga I. It was the fastest relegation of a former champion, Unirea being also the 2009–10 Liga I runners-up. After the relegation, the team was disbanded. Universitatea Craiova was relegated for the second time in club history, ending a five-year tenure in the highest football league of Romania. After the relegation, the team was temporary excluded by FRF from all internal competitions. Victoria and Sportul was supposed to make their immediate return to the second level, but Sportul remained in Liga I after the relegation of Timișoara and Gloria Bistrița on licensing problems, see below.

The teams promoted from 2010–11 Liga II are Seria I winners Ceahlăul Piatra Neamț, Seria II winners Petrolul Ploiești and Seria I runners-up Concordia Chiajna. Ceahlăul Piatra Neamț is returning to the first division after one year, Petrolul Ploiești after seven years, while Concordia Chiajna promoted for the first time in Liga I. After Seria II runners-up Bihor Oradea were denied a Liga I licence (see below), Mioveni, third placed in Liga II respective series, was promoted instead.

=== Venues ===
Universitatea Cluj	Steaua București	CFR Cluj	Ceahlăul Piatra Neamț
Cluj Arena	Steaua	Dr. Constantin Rădulescu	Ceahlăul
Capacity: 30,201	Capacity: 28,365	Capacity: 23,500	Capacity: 17,500
Petrolul Ploiești	Dinamo București	Voința Sibiu	Oțelul Galați
Ilie Oană	Dinamo	Municipal	Oțelul
Capacity: 15,073	Capacity: 15,032	Capacity: 14,200	Capacity: 13,500
Rapid București	2011–12 Liga I (Romania) Location of Bucharest teams.		Sportul Studențesc
Giulești-Valentin Stănescu	2011–12 Liga I (Romania) Location of Bucharest teams.		Regie
Capacity: 11,704 (Note: Capacity of Giulești-Valentin Stănescu Stadium has been reduced from 19,100 to 11,704 due to advanced degradation of the resistance structure of the South End.)	2011–12 Liga I (Romania) Location of Bucharest teams.		Capacity: 10,020
FC Vaslui	2011–12 Liga I (Romania) Location of Bucharest teams.		Pandurii Târgu Jiu
Municipal	2011–12 Liga I (Romania) Location of Bucharest teams.		Tudor Vladimirescu
Capacity: 9,240	2011–12 Liga I (Romania) Location of Bucharest teams.		Capacity: 9,200
Astra Ploiești	2011–12 Liga I (Romania) Location of Bucharest teams.		FC Brașov
Astra	2011–12 Liga I (Romania) Location of Bucharest teams.		Silviu Ploeșteanu
Capacity: 9,000	2011–12 Liga I (Romania) Location of Bucharest teams.		Capacity: 8,800
Târgu Mureș	Gaz Metan Mediaș	Mioveni	Concordia Chiajna
Trans-Sil	Gaz Metan	Orășenesc	Concordia
Capacity: 8,200	Capacity: 7,814	Capacity: 7,000	Capacity: 5,123

=== Personnel and kits ===
Note: Flags indicate national team as has been defined under FIFA eligibility rules. Players may hold more than one non-FIFA nationality.

Team	Head coach	Captain	Kit manufacturer	Shirt sponsor
Astra Ploiești	(Romania) Mircea Rednic	(Japan) Takayuki Seto	Adidas	InterAgro
Brașov	(Romania) Ionuț Badea	(Romania) Cristian Munteanu	Puma	Roman
Ceahlăul Piatra Neamț	(Romania) Costel Enache	(Romania) Andrei Dumitraș	Garman	Giga TV
CFR Cluj	(Romania) Ioan Andone	(Portugal) Cadú	Joma	EnergoBit
Concordia Chiajna	(Romania) Laurențiu Reghecampf	(Romania) Vlad Munteanu	Joma	Alexandrion
Dinamo București	(Italy) Dario Bonetti	(Romania) Ionel Dănciulescu	Nike	Orange
Gaz Metan Mediaș	(Romania) Cristian Pustai	(Romania) Cristian Todea	Joma	Romgaz
Mioveni	(Romania) Constantin Stancu	(Romania) Mihai Olteanu	Adidas	Consiliul Local Mioveni
Oțelul Galați	(Romania) Dorinel Munteanu	(Romania) Sergiu Costin	Masita	ArcelorMittal
Pandurii Târgu Jiu	(Romania) Petre Grigoraș	(Romania) Mihai Pintilii	Umbro	USMO
Petrolul Ploiești	(Romania) Gheorghe Mulțescu	(Haiti) Sony Mustivar	Adidas	Consiliul Local Ploiești
Rapid București	(Romania) Răzvan Lucescu	(Brazil) Marcos António	Puma	SuperBet
Sportul Studențesc	(Romania) Daniel Isăilă	(Romania) Costin Curelea	Puma	CitySmart
Steaua București	(Romania) Mihai Stoichiță	(Romania) Alexandru Bourceanu	Nike	—
Târgu Mureș	(Romania) Ioan Sabău	(Romania) László Sepsi	Joma	Primăria Târgu Mureș
Universitatea Cluj	(Romania) Claudiu Niculescu	(Poland) Łukasz Szukała	Nike	Romprest
Vaslui	(Portugal) Augusto Inácio	(Brazil) Wesley^{1}	Adidas	—
Voința Sibiu	(Romania) Alexandru Pelici	(Romania) Nicolae Grigore	Joma	Primăria Sibiu

=== Managerial changes ===
Team	Outgoing manager	Manner of departure	Date of vacancy	Position in table	Replaced by	Date of appointment
CFR Cluj	Alin Minteuan	End of contract	22 May 2011	Off-season	Jorge Costa	1 June 2011
Steaua București	Gabriel Caramarin	End of tenure as caretaker	26 May 2011	Off-season	Ronny Levy	10 June 2011
Rapid București	Marian Rada	End of tenure as caretaker	4 June 2011	Off-season	Răzvan Lucescu	4 June 2011
Dinamo București	Ioan Andone	Resigned	8 June 2011	Off-season	Liviu Ciobotariu	13 June 2011
Brașov	António Conceição	Resigned	14 July 2011	Off-season	Daniel Isăilă	14 July 2011
Astra Ploiești	Tibor Selymes	Sacked	1 August 2011	15	Marius Șumudică	3 August 2011
Brașov	Daniel Isăilă	End of tenure as caretaker	9 August 2011	10	José Murcia	9 August 2011
Mioveni	Ionuț Popa	Resigned	22 August 2011	18	Ilie Stan	22 August 2011
Brașov	José Murcia	Resigned	29 August 2011	11	Daniel Isăilă	29 August 2011
Mioveni	Ilie Stan	Resigned	18 September 2011	17	Constantin Stancu	19 September 2011
Târgu Mureș	Ioan Sabău	Resigned	26 September 2011	16	Tibor Selymes	27 September 2011
Steaua București	Ronny Levy	Resigned	30 September 2011	9	Ilie Stan	30 September 2011
Mioveni	Constantin Stancu	End of tenure as caretaker	4 October 2011	17	Mihai Stoichiță	4 October 2011
Sportul Studențesc	Gheorghe Mulțescu	Resigned	15 October 2011	15	Daniel Timofte	17 October 2011
Astra Ploiești	Marius Șumudică	Resigned	30 October 2011	8	Tibor Selymes	3 November 2011
Târgu Mureș	Tibor Selymes	Sacked	1 November 2011	17	Maurizio Trombetta	4 November 2011
Brașov	Daniel Isăilă	End of tenure as caretaker	1 November 2011	12	Marius Șumudică	1 November 2011
Sportul Studențesc	Daniel Timofte	End of tenure as caretaker	4 November 2011	15	Daniel Isăilă	4 November 2011
Mioveni	Mihai Stoichiță	Resigned	14 November 2011	18	Mihai Stoica	16 November 2011
Mioveni	Mihai Stoica	Resigned	1 December 2011	18	Marian Pană	4 December 2011
Concordia Chiajna	Laurențiu Diniță	Resigned	17 December 2011	17	Laurențiu Reghecampf	18 December 2011
Astra Ploiești	Tibor Selymes	Sacked	18 December 2011	9	Toni Conceição	6 January 2012
Târgu Mureș	Maurizio Trombetta	Sacked	21 January 2012	15	Marius Lăcătuș	21 January 2012
Universitatea Cluj	Ionuț Badea	Sacked	14 March 2012	8	Claudiu Niculescu	14 March 2012
Târgu Mureș	Marius Lăcătuș	Resigned	19 March 2012	16	Ioan Sabău	19 March 2012
Astra Ploiești	Toni Conceição	Sacked	26 March 2012	11	Mircea Rednic	29 March 2012
Steaua București	Ilie Stan	Resigned	27 March 2012	4	Mihai Stoichiță	27 March 2012
Petrolul Ploiești	Valeriu Răchită	Resigned	28 March 2012	17	Gheorghe Mulțescu	28 March 2012
CFR Cluj	Jorge Costa	Sacked	8 April 2012	1	Ioan Andone	8 April 2012
Dinamo București	Liviu Ciobotariu	Resigned	10 April 2012	2	Dario Bonetti	10 April 2012
Brașov	Marius Șumudică	Sacked	16 April 2012	11	Ionuț Badea	16 April 2012
Mioveni	Marian Pană	Sacked	4 May 2012	18	Constantin Stancu	4 May 2012

== Season events ==
=== Licensing controversies ===
The start of the 2011–12 season was affected by multiple licensing controversies involving Timișoara, Gloria Bistrița and Bihor Oradea.

On 30 May 2011, the Romanian Football Federation denied licences to four 2010–11 Liga I teams, Timișoara, Gloria Bistrița, Universitatea Craiova and Victoria Brănești, while a fifth team, Unirea Urziceni, did not apply for a licence. Of these five teams, Timișoara and Gloria Bistrița had achieved qualification for the 2011–12 season on competitional grounds. A final decision by the executive committee of the FRF on the matter, particularly on the question to which league both teams will be incorporated, was scheduled for 2 June 2011, but eventually postponed to 20 June 2011. As a direct consequence from the licence denial, Timișoara were not allowed to participate in the 2011–12 UEFA Champions League.

On 6 June 2011, the FRF announced that Bihor Oradea, runners-up in the 2010–11 Liga II Seria II and therefore having earned promotion, did not meet requirements for a Liga I licence.

On 11 June 2011, a FRF communique stated that the executive committee doesn't have the power to change the Licensing Commission decisions. However, on 20 June, the FRF Executive Committee decided that for the next three years the licences will not matter for Liga I promotion. Therefore, Timișoara, Gloria Bistrița and Bihor Oradea could play in the 2011–12 Liga I season. The decision was reverted on the same day, after an intervention of FRF president, Mircea Sandu. The only chance for the three teams to play in the next season would be a favorable decision from Court of Arbitration for Sport for their appeals.

On 22 June 2011, FRF announced that Sportul Studențesc will retain their Liga I place and Mioveni will promote instead of Bihor Oradea. FRF decided also that a play-off round will be played between Săgeata Năvodari and Voința Sibiu for the last remaining place in Liga 1. On 2 July, in Săgeata Năvodari, the first match of the play-off was a goalless draw. Voința Sibiu promoted for the first time in history in Liga I after a 2–0 victory in the second match of the play-off.

On 8 July, Court of Arbitration for Sport announced that the appeals from Timișoara, Bihor and Bistrița will be heard in an expedited manner in order to have a decision before the start of the season. On 18 July, CAS announced that the appeals were dismissed. The challenged decisions taken by the competent authorities in Romania and by UEFA were confirmed in their entirety.

=== Home ground dilemmas ===
Two of the most supported teams, Steaua București and Rapid București started the season without a contract with their traditional home grounds, Ghencea and Giulești.

The Ministry of National Defense, owner of Ghencea, denounced the contract with Steaua for unpaid debts. A new agreement is expected to be signed. Meanwhile, because Steaua's home ground was suspended for the first two stages because of the incidents in the 2010–11 Romanian Cup final and the 2011 Romanian Supercup, the team played the first two home matches at Constanța and Ploiești. Further matches was played in Ploiești and Buzău. Numerous other stadiums were considered by the Steaua owner George Becali for a new home: the new Arena Națională, CFR Cluj stadium, Buzău and Astra stadium. Ghencea owners invited Steaua to return to Ghencea, but only after the debts (around 560.000 euro) will be fully paid. However, Steaua played further matches on Astra and Buzău stadiums and National Arena. George Becali declared at the beginning of November that the team will settle on the National Arena until the end of 2011.

Rapid played the first game match on Regie, because they were suspended for the incidents created by fans during the last match of the 2010–11 Liga I. Because of debts towards CS Rapid București, owners of Giulești, they were still unable to use their traditional home stadium. CS Rapid București agreed to sign a new contract if a part of the debts were paid until the coming match of the fourth stage against Concordia Chiajna. The match was eventually played on the Nicolae Dobrin Stadium in Pitești. Before the sixth stage, Rapid president Dinu Gheorghe announced there is not yet an agreement and thus the match with FC Brașov will be played on Regie. On 12 September, a temporary accord was signed between the two parts, meaning that Rapid will return to their traditionally home ground for at least two matches. On 11 October 2011, was signed a contract for the entire season.

=== Investigations and arrests ===
On 25 September 2011, Vasile Avram, the president of Romanian Referees Commission (CCA), has been arrested on suspicion of taking bribes from a businessman close to Târgu Mureș. Further information revealed that in the same investigation are involved the presidents of other two clubs, Dinamo București and Vaslui, and the heads of Romanian Football Federation, Mircea Sandu, and Romanian Professional Football League, Dumitru Dragomir. It is still unclear how the 2011–12 Liga 1 season will be affected by these investigations. Vasile Avram was released after 58 days of arrest with some restrictions, but the process will continue. However, he was already replaced as the president of CCA with Ion Crăciunescu.

Also, in October 2011 National Anticorruption Directorate (DNA) started the investigation of the members of Romanian Football Federation Execute Committee, accusing them of abuse in the Universitatea Craiova temporary exclusion of all competition after last season relegation. Following the exclusion, all the Craiova's players was declared free of contract.

== League table ==
Pos	Team	Pld	W	D	L	GF	GA	GD	Pts	Qualification or relegation
1	CFR Cluj (C)	34	21	8	5	63	31	+32	71	Qualification to Champions League third qualifying round
2	Vaslui	34	22	4	8	58	29	+29	70	Qualification to Champions League third qualifying round
3	Steaua București	34	19	9	6	47	26	+21	66	Qualification to Europa League third qualifying round
4	Rapid București	34	18	10	6	54	29	+25	64	Qualification to Europa League second qualifying round
5	Dinamo București	34	18	8	8	57	32	+25	62	Qualification to Europa League play-off round (Note: Dinamo București won the 2011–12 Cupa României so it qualified for the 2012–13 UEFA Europa League play-off round.)
6	Oțelul Galați	34	15	7	12	34	29	+5	52	
7	Pandurii Târgu Jiu	34	12	11	11	47	40	+7	47 (Note: PAN 1–0 UCL; UCL 0–1 PAN)	
8	Universitatea Cluj	34	11	14	9	46	37	+9	47	
9	Concordia Chiajna	34	13	6	15	42	52	−10	45 (Note: CON 2–1 BRA; BRA 2–3 CON)	
10	Brașov	34	13	6	15	39	34	+5	45	
11	Ceahlăul Piatra Neamț	34	11	9	14	36	46	−10	42	
12	Astra Ploiești	34	11	8	15	36	43	−7	41 (Note: AST 2–0 GAZ; GAZ 0–0 AST)	
13	Gaz Metan Mediaș	34	11	8	15	39	54	−15	41	
14	Petrolul Ploiești	34	10	9	15	42	45	−3	39	
15	Târgu Mureș (R)	34	8	11	15	34	47	−13	35	Relegation to Liga II
16	Voința Sibiu (R)	34	8	8	18	24	45	−21	32	Relegation to Liga II
17	Sportul Studențesc București (R)	34	6	12	16	33	55	−22	30	Relegation to Liga II
18	Mioveni (R)	34	2	6	26	20	77	−57	12	Relegation to Liga II

Source: LPF (in Romanian)
Rules for classification: 1st points; 2nd overall goals difference; 3rd overall goals scored (until the end of the season)
(C) Champions; (R) Relegated

=== Positions by round ===
Team ╲ Round	1	2	3	4	5	6	7	8	9	10	11	12	13	14	15	16	17	18	19	20	21	22	23	24	25	26	27	28	29	30	31	32	33	34
CFR Cluj	2	2	3	7	5	3	2	2	4	4	2	2	3	3	2	2	2	2	2	2	1	1	1	1	1	1	2	1	1	1	2	2	1	1
Vaslui	18	14	9	13	9	7	8	7	5	6	7	6	7	5	8	5	4	7	5	5	5	5	3	3	5	5	4	3	3	2	1	1	2	2
Steaua București	8	4	2	4	3	6	7	9	8	8	8	7	5	8	6	4	6	4	4	4	4	4	4	4	3	3	5	5	5	4	3	3	3	3
Rapid București	1	9	3	2	2	2	4	3	3	2	3	3	2	2	3	3	3	3	3	3	3	3	5	5	4	4	3	2	2	3	4	5	4	4
Dinamo București	6	1	1	1	1	1	1	1	1	1	1	1	1	1	1	1	1	1	1	1	2	2	2	2	2	2	1	3	4	5	5	4	5	5
Oțelul Galați	12	12	8	5	8	14	10	10	11	9	9	9	8	6	7	8	7	5	6	6	6	6	6	6	6	6	7	6	8	6	6	6	6	6
Pandurii Târgu Jiu	8	5	12	6	6	4	3	5	6	5	4	4	6	9	5	7	5	6	7	7	7	7	7	8	8	8	8	8	7	8	8	8	8	7
Universitatea Cluj	6	3	5	3	4	5	5	4	2	3	5	5	4	4	4	6	8	8	8	8	8	8	8	7	7	7	6	7	6	7	7	7	7	8
Concordia Chiajna	12	12	17	17	18	18	18	18	18	18	18	16	16	17	17	17	17	17	17	17	17	16	16	16	15	15	14	13	12	13	11	9	10	9
Brașov	3	10	6	7	11	12	9	11	10	12	12	12	14	12	13	11	12	12	10	10	11	10	9	9	11	11	12	11	13	12	9	12	9	10
Ceahlăul Piatra Neamț	8	11	15	11	14	9	11	12	12	13	13	11	11	10	10	10	10	10	11	11	12	12	10	11	10	10	10	12	11	9	10	13	14	11
Astra Ploiești	17	15	13	10	10	10	6	6	7	7	6	8	9	7	9	9	9	9	9	9	9	9	11	10	9	9	9	9	9	10	12	10	11	12
Gaz Metan Mediaș	12	18	14	9	13	8	12	8	9	10	10	10	10	11	12	13	11	11	12	12	10	11	12	12	12	12	11	10	10	11	13	14	12	13
Petrolul Ploiești	3	7	11	13	7	11	13	13	13	11	11	13	12	13	11	12	13	13	14	15	15	17	17	17	16	16	16	15	15	14	14	11	13	14
Târgu Mureș	15	15	16	15	15	15	15	16	14	14	15	17	17	15	14	14	15	15	16	16	16	15	14	15	14	14	13	14	14	15	15	15	15	15
Voința Sibiu	8	7	7	12	12	13	14	14	15	16	14	14	13	14	15	15	14	14	13	13	14	14	13	14	13	13	15	16	16	16	16	16	16	16
Sportul Studențesc București	3	5	10	16	16	16	17	17	16	15	16	15	15	16	16	16	16	16	15	14	13	13	15	13	17	17	17	17	17	17	17	17	17	17
Mioveni	15	17	18	18	17	17	16	15	17	17	17	18	18	18	18	18	18	18	18	18	18	18	18	18	18	18	18	18	18	18	18	18	18	18

Source: kicker.de (in German)
= Leaders; = 2nd place; = 3rd place

== Results ==
Home \ Away	AST	BRA	CEA	CFR	CON	DIN	GAZ	MIO	OȚE	PAN	PET	RAP	SPO	STE	TGM	UCL	VAS	VOI
Astra Ploiești		1–4	0–0	0–1	0–2	0–0	2–0	3–1	3–1	2–0	1–1	0–1	2–2	2–1	0–2	0–0	1–0	0–1
Brașov	2–0		1–1	1–2	2–3	2–0	2–1 (Note: Match was played at Stadionul Trans-Sil, Târgu Mureș because FC Brașov home ground was suspended for incidents in the 2010–11 Romanian Cup against Steaua.)	4–0	0–2	2–1	1–0	1–0	1–0	1–2	2–1	1–1	1–2	3–0
Ceahlăul Piatra Neamț	1–2	1–0		0–2	0–0	0–5	2–0	2–0	0–2	1–1	2–1	1–2	1–2	1–0	1–1	1–1	1–3	2–1
CFR Cluj	2–0	1–0	2–1		2–4	2–3	0–2	3–0	2–0	2–0	1–1	0–5	6–1	1–1	1–0	3–1	2–0	2–1
Concordia Chiajna	0–1	2–1	2–0	0–4		1–3	0–0	3–1	1–0	3–1	0–2	1–0	1–2	0–2	4–1	0–0	0–3	2–0
Dinamo București	3–0	0–0	3–2	0–1	2–0		2–0 (Note: Match was played at National Arena)	4–1	2–1	2–0	1–3	0–0	1–3	1–3	1–0 (Note: Match was played at Stadionul Astra, Ploiești because Dinamo home ground was suspended for incidents in the 2010–11 Romanian Cup final.)	2–2	0–1	1–0
Gaz Metan Mediaș	0–0	1–1	3–1	1–1	1–0	0–5		1–1	1–0	3–2	0–1	2–2	3–1	3–0	2–1	2–5	1–1	3–0
Mioveni	0–1	0–1	1–2	0–5	1–3	0–1	4–2		1–2	0–2	0–0	1–2	2–1	0–1	0–0	0–1	0–5	1–2
Oțelul Galați	1–1	1–0	0–0	0–4	0–0	1–1	1–0	0–0		2–1	1–0	2–0	1–0	1–2	0–0	2–0	1–2	3–0
Pandurii Târgu Jiu	1–2	2–1	1–1	2–0	5–2	2–2	1–0	5–1	0–1		1–0	3–0	1–1	1–1	2–0	1–0	1–2	0–0
Petrolul Ploiești	3–1	2–0	0–1 (Note: Match was played at Stadionul Municipal, Buzău because Petrolul home ground was in construction at that time.)	1–1	3–4	1–5	4–0	3–1	2–1	0–0		0–1	0–3	0–3 (Note: Match awarded to Steaua (0–3) after it was suspended in the 45+10-minute at the score of 0–2 for incidents with Petrolul supporters.)	0–1	2–2	1–2	4–1
Rapid București	3–2	1–1 (Note: Match was played at Stadionul Regie, Bucharest)	1–2	1–1	2–0 (Note: Match was played at Stadionul Nicolae Dobrin, Pitești)	0–0	5–3	4–0	1–0	2–2	2–0		2–0	1–1	1–1	1–1	3–0 (Note: Match was played at Stadionul Regie, Bucharest because Rapid home ground was suspended for incidents in the last match of the 2010–11 Liga I.)	3–0
Sportul Studențesc București	0–4	2–1	1–1	1–1	2–2	0–2	1–2	0–0	0–2	0–0	1–1	0–2		0–0	1–1	2–4	1–0	2–2
Steaua București	2–1	1–0	1–0	1–1	2–1	3–2	0–0	4–0 (Note: Match was played at Stadionul Farul, Constanța because Steaua home ground was suspended for incidents in the 2010–11 Romanian Cup final.)	2–1 (Note: Match was played at Stadionul Municipal)	1–2 (Note: Match was played at Stadionul Astra, Ploiești)	2–1	0–0	4–1		2–0	2–1 (Note: Match was played at Stadionul Astra, Ploiești because Steaua home ground was suspended for incidents in the 2010–11 Romanian Supercup.)	0–1	1–0
Târgu Mureș	2–2	0–0	4–3	0–2	3–0	0–1	1–0	2–0	1–2	3–3	1–2	0–2	2–1	1–0		1–1	2–3	0–0
Universitatea Cluj	3–1	1–0	1–0 (Note: Match was played at Stadionul Gaz Metan, Mediaș because U Cluj home ground was in construction at that time.)	2–3	1–1	0–0	3–0	2–2	1–1	0–1	3–2	2–0	1–1	0–1	3–1		0–1	3–1
Vaslui	2–1	0–1	1–2	1–1	4–0	3–1	4–0	3–0	1–0	3–2	0–0	2–3	1–0	0–0	4–0	1–0		2–0
Voința Sibiu	1–0	2–1	1–2	0–1	1–0	0–1	0–2	3–1	0–1	0–0	1–1	0–1	1–0	1–1	1–1	0–0	3–0	

Source: LPF (in Romanian)
Legend: Blue = home team win; Yellow = draw; Red = away team win.

== Top goalscorers ==
Rank	Player	Club	Goals
1	(Brazil) Wesley	Vaslui	27
2	(Romania) Marius Niculae	Dinamo București	19
3	(Romania) Ionel Dănciulescu	Dinamo București	13
3	(Romania) Raul Rusescu	Steaua București	13
5	(Greece) Pantelis Kapetanos	CFR Cluj	12
5	(Tunisia) Hamza Younés	Petrolul Ploiești	12
5	(Romania) Ovidiu Herea	Rapid București	12
8	(Romania) Daniel Oprița	Petrolul Ploiești	11
9	(Nigeria) Kehinde Fatai	Astra Ploiești	10
9	(Senegal) Modou Sougou	CFR Cluj	10
9	(Bosnia and Herzegovina) Bojan Golubović	Ceahlăul Piatra Neamț	10

Source: Liga1.ro (in Romanian)

== Champion squad ==
CFR Cluj

Goalkeepers: Beto (Portugal) (27 / 0); Nuno Claro (Portugal) (3 / 0); Daniel Fernandes (Portugal) (2 / 0); Mihai Mincă (1 / 0); Eduard Stăncioiu (2 / 0).
Defenders: Ricardo Cadú (Portugal) (27 / 5); Mário Camora (Portugal) (28 / 1); Nuno Diogo (Portugal) (17 / 1); Vasile Maftei (15 / 2); Cristian Panin (21 / 0); Felice Piccolo (Italy) (16 / 1); Ionuț Rada (4 / 0); José Lionn (Brazil) (15 / 1).
Midfielders: Rafael Bastos (Brazil) (27 / 3); Pedro Celestino (Portugal) (9 / 1); Roberto De Zerbi (Italy) (10 / 3); Renan Garcia (Brazil) (18 / 3); Nicolas Godemèche (France) (6 / 0); Ioan Hora (21 / 1); Dominique Kivuvu (Angola) (3 / 0); Emmanuel Koné (Ivory Coast) (1 / 0); Gabriel Mureșan (28 / 4); Viorel Nicoară (12 / 0); Rui Pedro (Portugal) (13 / 0); Sixto Peralta (Argentina) (23 / 0); Bakary Saré (Burkina Faso) (6 / 0); Stojan Vranješ (Bosnia and Herzegovina) (14 / 2).
Forwards: Cristian Bud (3 / 0); Liviu Ganea (5 / 0); Pantelis Kapetanos (Greece) (28 / 12); Ronny Carlos da Silva (Brazil) (26 / 5); Modou Sougou (Senegal) (33 / 10); Weldon (Brazil) (12 / 7).
(league appearances and goals listed in brackets)

Manager: Jorge Costa (Portugal) / Ioan Andone.

== Season statistics ==
=== Scoring ===
- First goal of the season: Ciprian Deac for Rapid București against Vaslui (22 July 2011)
- 100th goal of the season: Dan Săndulescu for Mioveni against Gaz Metan Mediaș (29 August 2011)
- 200th goal of the season: Wesley for Vaslui against Mioveni (2 October 2011)
- 300th goal of the season: Paul Batin for Pandurii Târgu Jiu against Vaslui (20 November 2011)
- 400th goal of the season: Paíto for Vaslui against Concordia Chiajna (9 March 2012)
- 500th goal of the season: Dan Alexa for Rapid București against CFR Cluj (7 April 2012)
- 600th goal of the season: Wesley for Vaslui against Târgu Mureș (2 May 2012)
- 700th goal of the season: Wesley for Vaslui against Oțelul Galați (16 May 2012)
- Fastest goal of the season: 11 seconds – Cristian Irimia for Sportul Studențesc against Concordia Chiajna (25 July 2011)
- First own goal of the season: Rui Duarte (Rapid București) for Universitatea Cluj (30 July 2011)
- First penalty kick of the season: Cristian Tănase (Steaua București) against Mioveni (31 July 2011) (not scored)
- First scored penalty kick of the season: Cătălin Munteanu (Dinamo București) against Gaz Metan Mediaș (31 July 2011)
- First hat-trick of the season: Adrian Cristea (Universitatea Cluj) against Gaz Metan Mediaș (1 October 2011)
- Fastest hat-trick of the season: 11 minutes – Wesley (Vaslui) against Târgu Mureș (30 October 2011)
- All-time top scorers (second place): 202 – Ionel Dănciulescu (Dinamo București) (6 November 2011)
- All-time top scorer (foreign player): 44 – Wesley (Vaslui) (4 December 2011)
- Hat-tricks of the season:
  - Adrian Cristea (Universitatea Cluj) against Gaz Metan Mediaș (1 October 2011)
  - Wesley (Vaslui) against Mioveni (2 October 2011)
  - Daniel Oprița (Petrolul Ploiești) against Voința Sibiu (15 October 2011)
  - Marius Niculae (Dinamo București) against Ceahlăul Piatra Neamț (17 October 2011)
  - Wesley (Vaslui) against Târgu Mureș (30 October 2011)
  - Cardoso (Pandurii Târgu Jiu) against Concordia Chiajna (12 December 2011)
  - Wesley (Vaslui) against Ceahlăul Piatra Neamț (19 March 2012)
  - Hamza Younés (Petrolul Ploiești) against Concordia Chiajna (21 March 2012)
  - Mike Temwanjera (Vaslui) against Gaz Metan Mediaș (7 May 2012)
  - Bojan Golubović (Ceahlăul Piatra Neamț) against Târgu Mureș (17 May 2012)

=== Discipline ===
- First yellow card of the season: Dan Alexa for Rapid București (against Vaslui) (22 July 2011)
- First red card of the season: Zhivko Milanov for Vaslui (against Rapid București) (22 July 2011)
- Most red cards by a team: 7 – Târgu Mureș (updated on 19 November 2011)
- Fewest red cards by a team: 0 – Dinamo București
- Most red cards by a player: 3 – Ionuț Voicu (Mioveni) (updated on 18 December 2011)
- Most yellow cards by a team: 60 – Târgu Mureș (updated on 9 December 2011)
- Fewest yellow cards by a team: 37 – Brașov (updated on 9 December 2011)
- Most yellow cards by a player: 8 – Žarko Marković (Gaz Metan Mediaș), Miloš Pavlović (Vaslui), Milan Perendija (Oțelul Galați) (updated on 11 December 2011)
- Fastest red card of the season: 22 seconds – Ciprian Tănasă for Mioveni (against Ceahlăul Piatra Neamț) (4 November 2011)

=== Penalties ===
- Most penalties awarded for a team: 7 – Dinamo București
- Most penalties awarded against a team: 5 – Ceahlăul Piatra Neamț, Concordia Chiajna
- Most penalties scored by a team: 6 – Rapid București
- Most penalties scored against a team: 5 – Ceahlăul Piatra Neamț
- Most penalties missed by a team: 3 – Steaua București
- Most penalties saved by a team: 2 – Târgu Mureș, Petrolul Ploiești

=== Miscellaneous ===
- Highest transfer fee: 6 mil. Euro – Gabriel Torje from Dinamo București to Udinese (26 August 2011)
- All-time matches in Liga I (fifth place): 469 – Ionel Dănciulescu (Dinamo București) (17 December 2011)
- All-time matches in Liga I (sixth place): 468 – Petre Marin (Concordia Chiajna) (retired in the midseason)
- Winter champions: Dinamo București

== Attendances ==
#	Club	Average
1	Steaua	15,751
2	U Cluj	7,765
3	Petrolul	7,636
4	CFR Cluj	6,810
5	Oțelul	6,000
6	FC Rapid	5,329
7	Pandurii	5,294
8	Vaslui	5,059
9	Târgu Mureș	4,888
10	Dinamo 1948	4,453
11	Voința	4,424
12	Brașov	3,059
13	Ceahlăul	2,394
14	Mioveni	2,253
15	Gaz Metan	2,195
16	Concordia	2,024
17	Astra	1,035
18	Sportul Studenţesc	1,026
