= Saša Bjelanović =

Croatian footballer

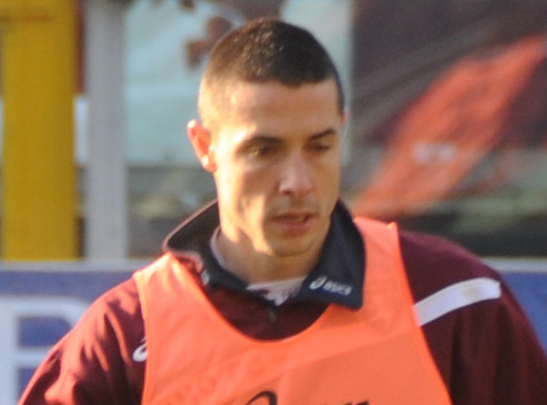
- Bjelanović warming up for Torino in 2007

Personal information
- Date of birth: 11 June 1979 (age 47)
- Place of birth: Zadar, SR Croatia, SFR Yugoslavia
- Height: 1.88 m (6 ft 2 in)
- Position: Forward

Senior career*
Years	Team	Apps	(Gls)
1996–1999	Zadar	76	(18)
1999	Dinamo Zagreb	1	(0)
1999–2000	Istra	18	(4)
2000–2002	Varteks	51	(27)
2002–2003	Como	15	(2)
2003	→ Chievo (loan)	12	(4)
2003	→ Perugia (loan)	0	(0)
2003–2005	Genoa	41	(12)
2004–2005	→ Lecce (loan)	22	(5)
2005–2007	Ascoli	57	(11)
2007–2009	Torino	19	(0)
2008–2009	→ Vicenza (loan)	39	(12)
2009–2010	Vicenza	35	(8)
2010–2011	CFR Cluj	13	(3)
2011	Atalanta	10	(1)
2011–2012	Verona	26	(5)
2012–2013	CFR Cluj	14	(4)
2013–2014	Varese	22	(4)
2014	Messina	10	(2)
2015	Pordenone	12	(1)
Total		493	(123)

International career
2005	Croatia	1	(0)
- * Club domestic league appearances and goals

Saša Bjelanović (Croatian pronunciation: [sǎʃa bjelǎːnoʋitɕ, sâ-]; born 11 June 1979) is a Croatian former professional footballer who played as a forward.

He has held an Italian passport since 2007, as his grandmother was from Trieste, Venezia Giulia; this made him eligible to acquire Italian nationality at birth.

== Club career ==
Saša Bjelanović started his career at Zadar. At the age of 20, he had already made 76 appearances for his native club. In summer 1999, he was signed by Croatian giant Dinamo Zagreb. However, he made only one appearance before being transferred to NK Istra from Pula and then NK Varteks.

On 31 May 2002, Como, at that time in Serie A, brought Bjelanović to Italy. He played 15 Serie A games for Como, and left on loan to Chievo.

As Como was relegated in summer 2003, on 16 July 2003, Bjelanović was loaned to Perugia. But on 30 August 2003, he was sold to Genoa C.F.C. of Serie B on a co-ownership deal for €1 million. Genoa was owned by former Como owner Enrico Preziosi.

Bjelanović played 41 out of possible 46 games for Genoa, and as Como was relegated again, this time to Serie C1, Genoa bought all the registration rights at the end of the season for another €150,000.

Genoa did not win promotion in summer 2004 and Bjelanović played his second Serie A season for US Lecce on loan.

In summer 2005, Genoa finally won promotion to Serie A, but due to match fixing scandal, Genoa was relegated to play in the Serie C1 next season. As a result, Bjelanović was sold to Ascoli, the team which was promoted in Genoa's place, on a co-ownership deal.

Bjelanović scored four goals in 31 Serie A appearances for Ascoli in the 2005–06 season. He then went on to score seven goals in the 2006–07 season and became the top scorer for Ascoli for the season. This is due to players leaving the club and Ascoli relegated to Serie B after finishing at 19th.

Bjelanović signed for his 6th Italian club, Torino, along with Paolo Zanetti, on 21 June 2007, on a co-ownership deal. In June 2008 Torino full contracted with Bjelanović.

In August 2008, Bjelanović was transferred to Vicenza. On 1 July 2009, he joined Vicenza definitely in 3-year contract for €700,000 as part of Nicolás Gorobsov's deal (for €800,000).

In June 2010 he was transferred to Liga I champions CFR Cluj for €250,000. (Note: Due to error the annual report of 2009–10 Vicenza Calcio SpA, the report did not shown the amount of departure. However it shown a loss of €216,667 which only occur when the transfer fee of €250,000 deducting residual contract value of €466,667 (€700,000 multiplied by two-third, the length of remaining contract)). He played only six months in Romania, in January 2011 being sold back in Italy, to Serie B club Atalanta for €385,000. However he was transferred to Serie B club Hellas Verona F.C. for free from the 2011 Serie B champion on 31 August 2011, the last day of Italian transfer window, after a nil game in 2011–12 Serie A. (Note: Player identification table and the explanatory note about written-off items of 2011 financial report.) At Verona he re-joined the former Cluj coach, Italian Andrea Mandorlini. On 3 September 2012, the last day of Romanian transfer window, he returned to Cluj for undisclosed fee.

He then joined Lega Pro club Messina for the 2014–15 season, but left the club in December 2014 by mutual consent, successively signing for Pordenone, another Lega Pro club, five days later.

== International career ==
Bjelanović was a member of the Croatian Youth team at the 1999 FIFA World Youth Championship, where he made only one appearance and scored one goal.

He made his debut for the Croatian senior national team on 9 February 2005, coming on as a second-half substitute for Eduardo da Silva in a friendly match against Israel, which ended in a 3–3 draw. In late March 2005, he was also part of the Croatian squad that played Iceland and Malta in the 2006 World Cup qualifying, but remained an unused substitute in both matches.

== Post career ==
On 25 May 2018 Bjelanović was confirmed as the Director of Football at Hajduk Split. Bjelanović was dismissed from the position of sports director of Hajduk after only eighteen months, without having spent a full season at the club. In June 2022, Bjelanović was appointed Director of Football Operations in NK Istra 1961 where, after just one season, he achieved historic success and fifth place in the Croatian Football League 2022–23, where they fought until the very end for the first ever appearance in any of the European competitions.

== Honours ==
Perugia

- UEFA Intertoto Cup: 2003

CFR Cluj

- Supercupa României: 2010

Atalanta

- Serie B: 2010–11

== See also ==
- Croats of Italy
