= Nicolas Godemèche =

French footballer (born 1984)

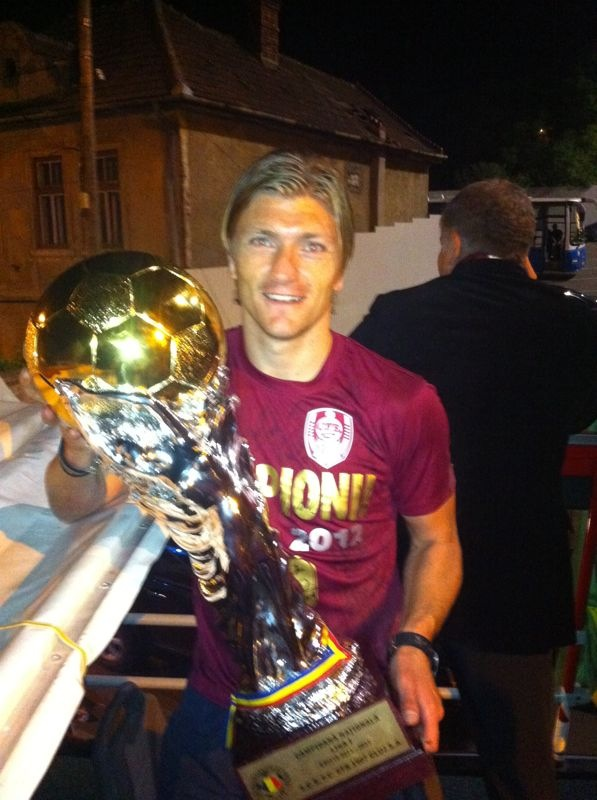
- Godemèche with the 2012 Liga I trophy

Personal information
- Full name: Nicolas Robert Michel Godemèche
- Date of birth: 22 June 1984 (age 42)
- Place of birth: Marseille, France
- Height: 1.84 m (6 ft 0 in)
- Position: Midfielder

Youth career
- 1991–2000: Olympique Marseille
- 2000–2003: Montpellier

Senior career*
Years	Team	Apps	(Gls)
2003–2007	Montpellier	70	(0)
2007	→ Reims (loan)	10	(0)
2007–2011	Naval	98	(4)
2012–2013	CFR Cluj	19	(0)
2013–2015	Waasland-Beveren	20	(0)
Total		217	(4)
- * Club domestic league appearances and goals

Nicolas Robert Michel Godemèche (born 22 June 1984) is a French former footballer who played as a defensive midfielder.

== Career ==
=== Youth career ===
Godemèche was born on 22 June 1984 in Marseille, France. He began playing junior-level football in 1991 for local club Olympique Marseille.

=== Montpellier and Reims ===
In 2000, Godemèche joined the junior center of Montpellier. He made his Ligue 1 debut for the senior squad on 2 August 2003 under coach Gérard Bernardet in a 1–1 home draw against Rennes. He made 13 league appearances until the end of the 2003–04 season, as his side suffered relegation to Ligue 2. In the middle of the 2006–07 Ligue 2 season, Godemèche was loaned for half a year by Montpellier to Reims.

=== Naval ===
In 2007, Godemèche went to play for Portuguese side Naval. His Primeira Liga debut took place on 15 September 2007 under coach Francisco Chaló in a 3–0 away loss to Benfica. He scored his first goal in the competition on 1 March 2009 in a 3–1 away win over Belenenses.

=== CFR Cluj ===
In January 2012, Godemèche joined Romanian club CFR Cluj. He made his Liga I debut on 2 March, playing as a starter before being substituted by Sixto Peralta in the 37th minute due to an injury in a 1–0 victory over FCM Târgu Mureș. He played a total of six matches during the 2011–12 season under coaches Jorge Costa and Ioan Andone, as the team won the championship. Afterwards, he played six games in the CFR's 2012–13 Champions League campaign as they got past Basel in the play-off round, then earned 10 points in a group composed of Manchester United, Galatasaray and Braga, which helped them finish third. Subsequently, they qualified for the round of 32 in the Europa League, where he featured in both legs of their defeat to Inter Milan.

=== Waasland-Beveren ===
In July 2013, Godemèche signed with Waasland-Beveren. His Belgian Pro League debut took place on 22 September 2013, when coach Glen De Boeck sent him in the 86th minute to replace Hrvoje Čale in a 0–0 draw against Genk. Godemèche ended his career after playing a few matches during the 2014–15 season.

== Honours ==
CFR Cluj

- Liga I: 2011–12
