= Ioan Hora =

Romanian footballer (born 1988)

- Hora lining up for Konyaspor in 2016

Personal information
- Full name: Adrian Ioan Hora
- Date of birth: 21 August 1988 (age 38)
- Place of birth: Oradea, Romania
- Height: 1.82 m (6 ft 0 in)
- Position: Forward

Team information
- Current team: Bihor Oradea
- Number: 7

Youth career
- –2005: CSȘ Oradea

Senior career*
Years	Team	Apps	(Gls)
2005–2008	UTA Arad	53	(7)
2008–2010	Gloria Bistrița	55	(6)
2010–2014	CFR Cluj	76	(6)
2014	→ ASA Târgu Mureș (loan)	15	(3)
2014–2015	ASA Târgu Mureș	30	(9)
2015–2016	Pandurii Târgu Jiu	37	(20)
2016–2017	Konyaspor	14	(1)
2017–2019	Akhisarspor	13	(0)
2018	→ Elazığspor (loan)	15	(3)
2019–2020	FCSB	25	(7)
2020	Gaz Metan Mediaș	5	(1)
2020–2021	UTA Arad	48	(10)
2022	Hermannstadt	10	(0)
2023	Lotus Băile Felix	10	(5)
2023–2024	Crișul Sântandrei	23	(14)
2024–	Bihor Oradea	57	(19)

International career
2005–2006	Romania U19	5	(0)
2008–2010	Romania U21	9	(4)
2015–2016	Romania	3	(0)
- * Club domestic league appearances and goals as of 31 October 2026

Adrian Ioan Hora (Romanian pronunciation: [adriˈan iˈo̯an ˈhora]; born 21 August 1988) is a Romanian professional footballer who plays as a forward for Liga II club Bihor Oradea, which he captains.

Deployed mainly as a winger during the first part of his career, he later found more success in the centre as a main striker.

== Club career ==
Born in Oradea in 1988, Hora started his career with youth club Oradea CSS. He started his professional career with UTA Arad in 2005, playing at the club till 2008 when he joined Gloria Bistrița. He made his debut for UTA Arad on 10 September 2006 in a 2–0 victory against Dinamo Bucuresti. Hora signed a three-year contract with the club in a 238,000 euro deal. He made his debut on 26 July in a 3–0 victory over Rapid Bucuresti. His first goal for the club came in a 2–2 draw over Steaua București. In his second season with the club, he made 30 appearances, finding the net four times.

In June 2010, Hora signed for defending Romanian Liga I champions CFR Cluj on a five-year contract. On joining the club, Hora said that he had spent "two beautiful years" at Gloria and also said that he wanted to make a mark in the UEFA Champions League. He played his first Champions League match on 15 September in a 2–1 win over Swiss club FC Basel. In 2014, he spent a loan spell at Liga II club Târgu Mureș with whom he won promotion to the first tier. He signed permanently for the club at the beginning of the 2014–15 season; where he would play 30 matches and score nine goals.

In July 2015, Hora signed a three-year contract with Pandurii Târgu Jiu. He ended the season as the league's top scorer with 20 goals.

In August 2016, Hora signed a three-year contract with Turkish side Konyaspor for an undisclosed transfer fee. He made 27 appearances in all competitions in the 2016–17 campaign, recording his sole goal in a 3–0 victory over Karabükspor on 25 May 2017.

Hora returned to Romania on 20 January 2019, penning a deal for an undisclosed period with FCSB.

On 11 February 2019, he made his debut and scored his first goal for the Roș-albaștrii in a 3–0 league victory over Hermannstadt. Thirteen days later, he helped to a 3–2 win against CS Universitatea Craiova after netting a double.

== International career ==
In January 2015, Hora was called up to the Romania national team for the unofficial friendlies against Bulgaria, Georgia and Moldova. He came on as a 70th-minute substitute in a 0–0 draw against the former.

He earned his first official cap for the nation on 23 March 2016, replacing Bogdan Stancu in a 1–0 victory over Lithuania at the Stadionul Marin Anastasovici in Giurgiu.

== Personal life ==
During his spell at Gloria Bistrița in 2010, Hora caused a car accident in the city of Cluj-Napoca after a match against CFR Cluj. In October 2012, the Cluj County court handed him a six-month prison sentence after he was convicted of driving the vehicle under the influence of alcohol.

== Career statistics ==
=== Club ===
As of 31 October 2026

Appearances and goals by club, season and competition
Club	Season	League			National cup (Note: Includes Cupa României, Turkish Cup)		League cup (Note: Includes Cupa Ligii)		Continental		Other		Total	
Club	Season	Division	Apps	Goals	Apps	Goals	Apps	Goals	Apps	Goals	Apps	Goals	Apps	Goals
UTA Arad	2005–06	Divizia B	20	4	—		—		—		—		20	4
UTA Arad	2006–07	Liga I	10	1	0	0	—		—		—		10	1
UTA Arad	2007–08	Liga I	23	2	1	0	—		—		—		24	2
UTA Arad	Total		53	7	1	0	—		—		—		54	7
Gloria Bistrița	2008–09	Liga I	25	2	2	1	—		—		—		27	3
Gloria Bistrița	2009–10	Liga I	30	4	2	0	—		—		—		32	4
Gloria Bistrița	Total		55	6	4	1	—		—		—		59	7
CFR Cluj	2010–11	Liga I	24	2	1	0	—		4 (Note: Appearances in UEFA Champions League)	0	1 (Note: Appearance in Supercupa României)	0	30	2
CFR Cluj	2011–12	Liga I	21	1	1	0	—		—		—		22	1
CFR Cluj	2012–13	Liga I	21	3	5	1	—		2 (Note: Appearance(s) in UEFA Europa League)	0	1	0	29	4
CFR Cluj	2013–14	Liga I	10	0	0	0	—		—		—		10	0
CFR Cluj	Total		76	6	7	1	0	0	6	0	2	0	91	7
ASA Târgu Mureș (loan)	2013–14	Liga II	15	3	—		—		—		—		15	3
ASA Târgu Mureș	2014–15	Liga I	30	9	3	1	—		—		—		33	10
ASA Târgu Mureș	Total		45	12	3	1	—		—		—		48	13
Pandurii Târgu Jiu	2015–16	Liga I	35	19	1	1	1	0	—		—		37	20
Pandurii Târgu Jiu	2016–17	Liga I	2	1	—		—		1	0	—		3	1
Pandurii Târgu Jiu	Total		37	20	1	1	1	0	1	0	—		40	21
Konyaspor	2016–17	Süper Lig	14	1	10	2	—		3	0	—		27	3
Akhisar	2017–18	Süper Lig	13	0	4	4	—		—		—		17	4
Elazığspor (loan)	2017–18	TFF 1. Lig	15	3	—		—		—		—		15	3
FCSB	2018–19	Liga I	14	6	—		—		—		—		14	6
FCSB	2019–20	Liga I	11	1	2	1	—		3	0	—		16	2
FCSB	Total		25	7	2	1	0	0	3	0	—		30	8
Gaz Metan Mediaș	2019–20	Liga I	5	1	—		—		—		—		5	1
UTA Arad	2020–21	Liga I	31	6	2	1	—		—		—		33	7
UTA Arad	2021–22	Liga I	17	4	1	0	—		—		—		18	4
UTA Arad	Total		48	10	3	1	—		—		—		51	11
Hermannstadt	2021–22	Liga I	8	0	—		—		—		—		8	0
Hermannstadt	2022–23	Liga I	2	0	2	0	—		—		—		4	0
Hermannstadt	Total		10	0	2	0	—		—		—		12	0
Lotus Băile Felix	2022–23	Liga III	10	5	—		—		—		—		10	5
Crișul Sântandrei	2023–24	Liga III	23	14	0	0	—		—		—		23	14
Bihor Oradea	2024–25	Liga II	18	6	1	0	—		—		—		19	6
Bihor Oradea	2025–26	Liga II	28	12	2	0	—		—		—		30	12
Bihor Oradea	2026–27	Liga II	11	1	4	2	—		—		—		15	3
Bihor Oradea	Total		57	19	7	2	—		—		—		64	21
Career total			486	111	44	14	1	0	13	0	2	0	546	125

=== International ===
As of 25 May 2016

Appearances and goals by national team and year
National team	Year	Apps	Goals
Romania	2015	1	0
Romania	2016	2	0
Total		3	0

== Honours ==
CFR Cluj

- Liga I: 2011–12
- Cupa României runner-up: 2012–13
- Supercupa României: 2010

Konyaspor

- Turkish Cup: 2016–17
- Turkish Super Cup: 2017

Individual

- Liga I top scorer: 2015–16
- DigiSport Liga I Player of the Month: October 2015
