= Bakary Saré =

Footballer (born 1990)

Personal information
- Date of birth: 5 April 1990 (age 36)
- Place of birth: Abidjan, Ivory Coast
- Height: 1.82 m (6 ft 0 in)
- Position: Defensive midfielder

Youth career
- 2003–2004: FC Bibo
- 2004–2007: Anderlecht

Senior career*
Years	Team	Apps	(Gls)
2007–2010	Anderlecht	28	(0)
2010	→ Rosenborg (loan)	3	(0)
2011–2014	CFR Cluj	24	(0)
2013	→ Dinamo Zagreb (loan)	8	(0)
2014	→ Al Ain (loan)	0	(0)
2014–2016	Vitória Guimarães	45	(5)
2016–2017	Moreirense	12	(0)
2017–2018	Belenenses	14	(1)
Total		135	(7)

International career
2010	Ivory Coast U20	5	(1)
2016–2018	Burkina Faso	8	(0)
Medal record
Representing Burkina Faso
Africa Cup of Nations
Third place	2017 Gabon
- * Club domestic league appearances and goals

Bakary Bouba Saré (born 5 April 1990) is a former professional footballer who played as a midfielder. Born in the Ivory Coast, he made eight appearances for the Burkina Faso national team.

== Club career ==
=== Anderlecht ===
Saré was born on 5 April 1990 in Abidjan, Ivory Coast and began playing junior-level football at FC Bibo. In 2004, he joined the junior center of Anderlecht. He made his Belgian First Division debut for the senior squad on 22 December 2007, when coach Ariël Jacobs sent him in the 82nd minute to replace Mbo Mpenza in a 3–2 home win over RAEC Mons. During the same season, he played in a 2–1 victory against Bayern Munich in the UEFA Cup round of 16. At the end of the season, the team won the Belgian Cup, but Jacobs did not use Saré in the 3–2 win over Gent in the final.

Saré made 18 league appearances under Jacobs during the 2009–10 season, as Anderlecht won the championship. In the same season, he helped the team get past Athletic Bilbao in the round of 32, but Saré missed the round of 16, where his side was defeated by Hamburg. Subsequently, he played the entire match in the 1–0 victory over Gent in the 2010 Belgian Super Cup.

=== Rosenborg ===
On 31 August 2010, Saré was sent on loan by Anderlecht to Rosenborg. His debut in the Tippeligaen took place on 19 September 2010 under coach Nils Arne Eggen in a 3–2 away victory against SK Brann. He made three appearances until the end of the season, as the team won the title. Saré also played three matches in the 2010–11 Europa League group stage, resulting in two losses to Atlético Madrid and one defeat to Bayer Leverkusen.

=== CFR Cluj ===
On 23 February 2011, Saré joined Romanian club CFR Cluj. He made his Liga I debut on 11 April under coach Alin Minteuan in a 0–0 draw against FCM Târgu Mureș. He played six league matches in the 2011–12 season under coaches Jorge Costa and Ioan Andone, helping the team win the championship. Afterwards, he played in all four matches, as CFR advanced past Slovan Liberec and Basel in the 2012–13 Champions League qualifying rounds, reaching the group stage. During the second leg against Basel, Saré suffered a severe injury.

=== Dinamo Zagreb and Al Ain ===
In July 2013, Saré was loaned by CFR to Dinamo Zagreb. His debut in the Croatian league took place on 19 July 2013 under coach Krunoslav Jurčić in a 3–0 home victory against NK Zadar. He then played in a 3–0 away loss to Ludogorets Razgrad in the 2013–14 Europa League group stage. Saré made eight league appearances in the first half of the 2013–14 season, leaving afterwards, but Dinamo still managed to win the title without him.

On 20 January 2014, Saré joined UAE Arabian Gulf League side Al Ain on a six-month loan deal. However, he did not make a single league appearance for them.

=== Vitória Guimarães ===
In July 2014, Saré joined Portuguese side Vitória Guimarães. He made his Primeira Liga debut on 16 August, when coach Rui Vitória sent him in the 90th minute to replace Bernard Mensah in a 3–1 away victory over Gil Vicente. His first goal in the competition came when he opened the scoring in a 3–0 home win against Sporting Lisbon. In January 2016, Saré scored three goals in three consecutive matches, which helped his side earn draws against Arouca and Belenenses, and also a 1–0 win over Porto.

=== Moreirense and Belenenses ===
In October 2016, Saré went to play for Moreirense. The team won the 2016–17 Taça da Liga, but coach Augusto Inácio did not use him in the 1–0 win over Braga in the final. In September 2017, Saré moved to Belenenses. On 28 October, he scored a goal in a 3–0 victory against his former side, Moreirense. Saré accumulated a total of 71 matches with six goals in the Primeira Liga and 21 matches in European competitions.

== International career ==
Saré played in all five matches for Ivory Coast's under-20 national team in their winning campaign for the 2010 Toulon Tournament, scoring once in a 2–1 group stage loss to France.

Saré switched allegiance from Ivory Coast to Burkina Faso, making his debut for them on 26 March 2016 under coach Paulo Duarte in a 1–0 victory against Uganda in the 2017 Africa Cup of Nations qualifiers. His second appearance was in the second match against the same opponent and this time the result was a 0–0 draw. Saré was selected by Duarte to be in the squad for the 2017 Africa Cup of Nations final tournament. There, he played three matches, including a 2–0 win over Tunisia in the quarter-finals. Burkina Faso was defeated by Egypt in the semi-finals and then claimed third place after defeating Ghana, though Saré did not feature in these matches. His last appearance for the national team took place on 27 May 2018 in a 1–0 friendly victory over Cameroon, totaling eight matches for The Stallions.

== Honours ==
Anderlecht

- Belgian Pro League: 2009–10
- Belgian Cup: 2007–08
- Belgian Super Cup: 2010

Rosenborg

- Tippeligaen: 2010

CFR Cluj

- Liga I: 2011–12

Dinamo Zagreb

- Prva HNL: 2013–14

Moreirense

- Taça da Liga: 2016–17

Burkina Faso

- Africa Cup of Nations bronze: 2017
