= 2009–10 FC Unirea Urziceni season =

Unirea Urziceni
2009–10 season
- President: Dumitru Bucşaru
- Head coach: Dan Petrescu; Ronny Levy
- Stadium: Stadionul Tineretului
- Liga I: 2nd
- Cupa României: Round of 16
- Supercupa României: Runners-up
- Champions League: Group stage
- Europa League: Round of 32
- Top goalscorer: League: Marius Bilașco (12); All: Marius Bilașco (13)

The 2009–10 season of Unirea Urziceni began on 25 July with the first training session, led by the team's head coach Dan Petrescu. After several friendlies the first competitive game was the Romanian Supercup against CFR Cluj on 26 July 2009. The match ended 1–1 in regular time, but CFR Cluj managed to win the cup after the penalty shootout, in which Răzvan Pădureţu, Raul Rusescu and Sorin Frunză missed.

Unirea has made several squad changes, signing former Steaua captain Sorin Paraschiv, former Rapid captain Vasile Maftei and Antonio Semedo. Sorin Rădoi was loaned to Unirea Alba Iulia.

== Pre-season and friendlies ==
7 July 2009	Unirea Urziceni (Romania)	4–1	(Romania) Înfrăţirea Hărman	Braşov, Romania
	Onofraş 18', 33'; Fernandes 87'; Rusescu 90'	(Report)	Nazare 42'	Stadium: Carpaţi

11 July 2009	Petrolul Ploieşti (Romania)	2–2	(Romania) Unirea Urziceni	Ploieşti, Romania
	Elek 55'; Muţiu 66'	(Report)	Rusescu 12'; Fernandes (yellow card) 87'	Stadium: Ilie Oană

13 July 2009	Unirea Urziceni (Romania)	1–2	(England) Plymouth Argyle
	Rusescu 34'	(Report)

16 July 2009	Ayr United (Scotland)	1–2	(Romania) Unirea Urziceni	Ayr, Scotland
	Roberts	(Report)		Stadium: Somerset Park; Attendance: 970

18 July 2009	Celtic Reserves (Scotland)	1–1	(Romania) Unirea Urziceni	Glasgow, Scotland
	McGowan 15'	(Report)	Rusescu 50'	Stadium: Celtic Park

22 July 2009	Greenock Morton (Scotland)	1–3	(Romania) Unirea Urziceni	Greenock, Scotland
	Masterton 60'	(Report)	Todoran 15'; Dănălache 36'; Paraschiv 88'	Stadium: Cappielow; Attendance: 1,059

== Competitions ==
=== Overall record ===
Competition	First match	Last match	Starting round	Final position	Record							
Competition	First match	Last match	Starting round	Final position	Pld	W	D	L	GF	GA	GD	Win %
Liga I	1 August 2009	22 May 2010	Matchday 1	Winners	34	18	12	4	53	26	+27	52.94
Cupa României	27 October 2009		Round of 32	Round of 16	2	1	0	1	3	1	+2	50.00
Supercupa României	26 July 2009		Final	Runners-up	1	0	1	0	1	1	+0	0.00
UEFA Champions League	16 September 2009	9 December 2009	Group stage	Group stage	6	2	2	2	8	8	+0	33.33
UEFA Europa League	18 February 2010	25 February 2010	Round of 32	Round of 32	2	0	0	2	1	4	−3	0.00
Total					45	21	15	9	66	40	+26	46.67

Source: Competitions

=== Supercupa României ===
26 July 2009 Final	Unirea Urziceni	1–1 (a.e.t.) (2–3 p)	CFR Cluj	Bucharest
21:00 EEST (UTC+3)	Frunză 50'	Report	Cadú 41'	Stadium: Giuleşti-Valentin Stănescu; Attendance: 2,500; Referee: Georgian Ionescu
	Penalties
	Pădureţu (penalty missed); Rusescu (penalty missed); Frunză (penalty missed); Bilaşco (penalty scored); Bordeanu (penalty scored)		(penalty scored) Alcântara; (penalty missed) Dubarbier; (penalty missed) Culio; (penalty scored) Dani; (penalty scored) Cadú

=== Liga I ===
==== League table ====
Pos	Team	Pld	W	D	L	GF	GA	GD	Pts	Qualification or relegation
1	CFR Cluj (C)	34	20	9	5	46	23	+23	69	Qualification to Champions League group stage
2	Unirea Urziceni	34	18	12	4	53	26	+27	66	Qualification to Champions League third qualifying round
3	Vaslui	34	18	8	8	44	28	+16	62 (Note: VAS 2–1 STE; STE 2–1 VAS)	Qualification to Europa League play-off round (Note: Since 2009–10 Cupa României winners CFR Cluj and runners-up Vaslui qualified for European competitions via their league placement, the allocation of UEFA Europa League spots effectively reverted to league placement as well, with the 6th-placed team Dinamo București also qualifying.)
4	Steaua București	34	18	8	8	49	36	+13	62	Qualification to Europa League play-off round
5	Timișoara	34	15	14	5	55	27	+28	59	Qualification to Europa League third qualifying round

Source: LPF (in Romanian)
Rules for classification: 1) points; 2) head-to-head points; 3) head-to-head goal difference; 4) head-to-head goals scored; 5) goal difference; 6) number of goals scored.
(C) Champions

==== Results summary ====
Overall								Home						Away					
Pld	W	D	L	GF	GA	GD	Pts	W	D	L	GF	GA	GD	W	D	L	GF	GA	GD
34	18	12	4	53	26	+27	66	10	5	2	30	13	+17	8	7	2	23	13	+10

Source: LT

==== Results by round ====
Round	1	2	3	4	5	6	7	8	9	10	11	12	13	14	15	16	17	18	19	20	21	22	23	24	25	26	27	28	29	30	31	32	33	34
Ground	A	H	A	H	A	H	A	H	A	H	A	H	A	A	H	A	H	H	A	H	A	H	A	H	A	H	A	H	A	H	H	A	H	A
Result	L	W	W	D	W	W	L	W	D	L	D	W	D	W	W	W	W	L	D	D	D	D	W	D	W	D	D	W	W	W	W	D	W	W
Position	16	11	4	7	5	2	5	1	2	5	6	7	7	6	3	3	2	2	3	2	4	6	5	6	6	5	5	4	2	2	2	2	2	2

Source: Matches
A = Away; H = Home; W = Win; D = Draw; L = Loss

==== Matches ====
1 August 2009 1	CFR Cluj	2–0	Unirea Urziceni	Cluj-Napoca
20:30 EEST (UTC+3)	Mara (yellow card) 29'; Dani (yellow card) 41' (yellow-red card) 78'; Peralta 43'; Culio (yellow card) 51'; Dubarbier 55'	Report	Bilaşco (yellow card) 35'; Gomes (yellow card) 39' (yellow-red card) 60'; Brandan (yellow card) 57'; Pădureţu (yellow card) 72'	Stadium: Dr. Constantin Rădulescu; Attendance: 10,000; Referee: Marius Avram

8 August 2009 2	Unirea Urziceni	1–0	Rapid București	Urziceni
21:00 EEST (UTC+3)	Pădureţu 13'; Apostol (yellow card) 21'; Frunză (yellow card) 90+5'	Report	Matič (yellow card) 11'; Lazăr (yellow card) 25'; Constantin (yellow card) 42'; Păun (yellow card) 52'; Iencsi (yellow card) 52'; Herea (yellow card) 54'	Stadium: Tineretului Stadium; Attendance: 5,000; Referee: István Kovács

16 August 2009 3	Steaua București	0–1	Unirea Urziceni	Bucharest
20:45 EEST (UTC+3)		Report	Apostol 72'	Stadium: Stadionul Steaua; Referee: Sebastian Colțescu

22 August 2009 4	Unirea Urziceni	0–0	Timișoara	Urziceni
19:30 EEST (UTC+3)		Report		Stadium: Tineretului Stadium; Referee: Alexandru Deaconu

28 August 2009 5	Oțelul Galați	1–4	Unirea Urziceni	Galați
17:30 EEST (UTC+3)	Paraschiv 37'	Report	Bilașco 8' (pen.), 88'; Maftei 44'; Onofraș 84'	Stadium: Oțelul Stadium; Referee: Alexandru Tudor

12 September 2009 6	Unirea Urziceni	1–0	Unirea Alba Iulia	Urziceni
17:00 EEST (UTC+3)	Marinescu 33'	Report		Stadium: Tineretului Stadium; Referee: Marius Avram

20 September 2009 7	Dinamo București	2–1	Unirea Urziceni	Bucharest
20:00 EEST (UTC+3)	Cristea 48'; Torje 90'	Report	Apostol 28'	Stadium: Dinamo Stadium; Referee: Lutz Wagner (Germany)

25 September 2009 8	Unirea Urziceni	4–1	Astra Ploiești	Urziceni
20:00 EEST (UTC+3)	Rusescu 13'; Varga 59'; Galamaz 63'; Dănălache 90'	Report	Đokić 68'	Stadium: Tineretului Stadium; Referee: Paul Unimatan

3 October 2009 9	Gaz Metan Mediaș	0–0	Unirea Urziceni	Mediaș
20:00 EEST (UTC+3)		Report		Stadium: Gaz Metan Stadium; Referee: Marius Avram

16 October 2009 10	Unirea Urziceni	1–2	Vaslui	Urziceni
18:30 EEST (UTC+3)	Onofraș 7'	Report	Gerlem Willian 50'; Wesley 75'	Stadium: Tineretului Stadium; Referee: Matteo Trefoloni (Italy)

24 October 2009 11	Pandurii Târgu Jiu	0–0	Unirea Urziceni	Târgu Jiu
20:00 EEST (UTC+3)		Report		Stadium: Stadionul Tudor Vladimirescu; Referee: Augustus Constantin

31 October 2009 12	Unirea Urziceni	3–2	FC U Craiova	Urziceni
21:30 EET (UTC+2)	Frunză 27', 60'; Bilașco 90'	Report	Costea 54'; Wobay 70'	Stadium: Tineretului Stadium; Referee: Oleh Oriekhov (Ukraine)

7 November 2009 13	Brașov	0–0	Unirea Urziceni	Brașov
21:15 EET (UTC+2)		Report		Stadium: Silviu Ploeșteanu Stadium; Referee: Teodor Crăciunescu

21 November 2009 14	Internațional Curtea de Argeș	1–2	Unirea Urziceni	Mioveni
15:30 EET (UTC+2)	Voiculeț 51'	Report	Bilașco 20'; Onofraș 39'	Stadium: Orășenesc Stadium; Referee: Paul Unimatan

30 November 2009 15	Unirea Urziceni	2–0	Gloria Bistrița	Urziceni
20:00 EET (UTC+2)	Semedo 8'; Galamaz 84'	Report		Stadium: Tineretului Stadium; Referee: Alexandru Deaconu

4 December 2009 16	Ceahlăul Piatra Neamț	2–3	Unirea Urziceni	Piatra Neamț
20:30 EET (UTC+2)	Ibrahim 29'; Vinicius Fabbron 34'	Report	Semedo 30'; Onofraș 53'; Brandán 85' (pen.)	Stadium: Ceahlăul Municipal Stadium; Referee: Anastasios Kakos (Greece)

14 December 2009 17	Unirea Urziceni	2–0	Politehnica Iași	Urziceni
20:30 EET (UTC+2)	Bilașco 64'; Semedo 83'	Report		Stadium: Tineretului Stadium; Referee: Victor Berbecaru

22 February 2010 18	Unirea Urziceni	0–1	CFR Cluj	Urziceni
17:30 EET (UTC+2)		Report	Traoré 43'	Stadium: Tineretului Stadium; Referee: Marius Avram

28 February 2010 19	Rapid București	1–1	Unirea Urziceni	Bucharest
17:00 EET (UTC+2)	Iencsi 11'	Report	Bilașco 44'	Stadium: Stadionul Giulești-Valentin Stănescu; Referee: Alexandru Tudor

7 March 2010 20	Unirea Urziceni	2–2	Steaua București	Urziceni
20:30 EET (UTC+2)	Frunză 2'; Onofraș 71'	Report	Petre 7'; Kapetanos 90'	Stadium: Tineretului Stadium

14 March 2010 21	Timișoara	0–0	Unirea Urziceni	Timișoara
18:00 EET (UTC+2)		Report		Stadium: Dan Păltinișanu Stadium; Referee: István Kovács

18 March 2010 22	Unirea Urziceni	0–0	Oțelul Galați	Urziceni
18:30 EET (UTC+2)		Report		Stadium: Tineretului Stadium; Referee: Radu Petrescu

22 March 2010 23	Unirea Alba Iulia	1–2	Unirea Urziceni	Alba Iulia
15:00 EET (UTC+2)	Bucurică 38'	Report	Brandán 47'; Onofraș 53'	Stadium: Cetate Stadium; Referee: Sebastian Colțescu

28 March 2010 24	Unirea Urziceni	4–4	Dinamo București	Urziceni
20:00 EEST (UTC+3)	Onofraș 2'; Semedo 10'; Bilașco 70' (pen.), 90'	Report	Fernandes 6' (o.g.); Cristea 8', 64' (pen.); Torje 48'	Stadium: Tineretului Stadium; Referee: Marius Avram

2 April 2010 25	Astra Ploiești	0–2	Unirea Urziceni	Ploiești
16:30 EEST (UTC+3)		Report	Galamaz 31'; Rusescu 68'	Stadium: Astra Stadium; Referee: Robert Dumitru

7 April 2010 26	Unirea Urziceni	1–1	Gaz Metan Mediaș	Urziceni
14:30 EEST (UTC+3)	Bilașco 35'	Report	Dudiță 55'	Stadium: Tineretului Stadium; Referee: Teodor Crăciunescu

10 April 2010 27	Vaslui	1–1	Unirea Urziceni	Vaslui
21:00 EEST (UTC+3)	Akakpo 25'	Report	Rusescu 90'	Stadium: Municipal Stadium; Referee: Ovidiu Hațegan

16 April 2010 28	Unirea Urziceni	3–0	Pandurii Târgu Jiu	Urziceni
20:30 EEST (UTC+3)	Galamaz 27'; Marinescu 38'; Rusu 77' (o.g.)	Report		Stadium: Tineretului Stadium; Referee: Alexandru Deaconu

25 April 2010 29	FC U Craiova	1–4	Unirea Urziceni	Drobeta-Turnu Severin
17:00 EEST (UTC+3)	Gângioveanu 74'	Report	Bilașco 9'; Rusescu 71'; Pădurețu 81'; Semedo 88'	Stadium: Stadionul Municipal; Referee: Radu Petrescu

2 May 2010 30	Unirea Urziceni	1–0	Brașov	Urziceni
18:30 EEST (UTC+3)	Rusescu 82'	Report		Stadium: Tineretului Stadium; Referee: Sebastian Colțescu

6 May 2010 31	Unirea Urziceni	1–0	Internațional Curtea de Argeș	Urziceni
19:30 EEST (UTC+3)	Bilașco 77'	Report		Stadium: Tineretului Stadium; Referee: István Kovács

11 May 2010 32	Gloria Bistrița	0–0	Unirea Urziceni	Bistrița
20:30 EEST (UTC+3)		Report		Stadium: Jean Pădureanu Stadium; Referee: Robert Dumitru

17 May 2010 33	Unirea Urziceni	4–0	Ceahlăul Piatra Neamț	Urziceni
20:00 EEST (UTC+3)	Bilașco 13'; Frunză 38'; Rusescu 52', 66'	Report		Stadium: Tineretului Stadium; Referee: Radu Petrescu

22 May 2010 34	Politehnica Iași	1–2	Unirea Urziceni	Iași
16:30 EEST (UTC+3)	Diarrassouba 6'	Report	Onofraș 61'; Rusescu 81'	Stadium: Emil Alexandrescu Stadium; Referee: Marius Avram

=== Cupa României ===
23 September 2009 Round of 32	Unirea Urziceni	3–0	Sportul Studențesc București	Urziceni
16:00 EEST (UTC+3)	Dănălache 19' (pen.), 26', 81'	Report		Stadium: Tineretului Stadium

27 October 2009 Round of 16	Unirea Urziceni	0–1	Brașov	Urziceni
21:30 EET (UTC+2)		Report	Munteanu 12'	Stadium: Tineretului Stadium

=== UEFA Champions League ===
==== Group stage ====
Pos	Team	Pld	W	D	L	GF	GA	GD	Pts	Qualification	SEV	STU	URZ	RAN
1	(Spain) Sevilla	6	4	1	1	11	4	+7	13	Advance to knockout phase	—	1–1	2–0	1–0
2	(Germany) VfB Stuttgart	6	2	3	1	9	7	+2	9	Advance to knockout phase	1–3	—	3–1	1–1
3	(Romania) Unirea Urziceni	6	2	2	2	8	8	0	8	Transfer to Europa League	1–0	1–1	—	1–1
4	(Scotland) Rangers	6	0	2	4	4	13	−9	2		1–4	0–2	1–4	—

Source: RSSSF

16 September 2009 1	Sevilla (Spain)	2–0	(Romania) Unirea Urziceni	Seville, Spain
20:45 CEST (UTC+2)	Luís Fabiano 45+1'; Renato 70'	Report		Stadium: Ramón Sánchez Pizjuán; Attendance: 37,500; Referee: Matteo Trefoloni (Italy)

29 September 2009 2	Unirea Urziceni (Romania)	1–1	(Germany) Stuttgart	Bucharest, Romania
21:45 EEST (UTC+3)	Varga 48'	Report	Tasci 5'	Stadium: Steaua; Attendance: 13,557; Referee: Laurent Duhamel (France)

20 October 2009 3	Rangers (Scotland)	1–4	(Romania) Unirea Urziceni	Glasgow, Scotland
19:45 WEST (UTC+1)	Vilana 2' (o.g.)	Report	Bilașco 32'; Lafferty 49' (o.g.); McCulloch 59' (o.g.); Brandán 65'	Stadium: Ibrox; Attendance: 39,476; Referee: Eric Braamhaar (Netherlands)

4 November 2009 4	Unirea Urziceni (Romania)	1–1	(Scotland) Rangers	Bucharest, Romania
21:45 EET (UTC+2)	Onofraș 88'	Report	McCulloch 79'	Stadium: Steaua; Attendance: 9,923; Referee: Claus Bo Larsen (Denmark)

24 November 2009 5	Unirea Urziceni (Romania)	1–0	(Spain) Sevilla	Bucharest, Romania
21:45 EET (UTC+2)	Dragutinović 45' (o.g.)	Report		Stadium: Steaua; Attendance: 10,007; Referee: Tom Henning Øvrebø (Norway)

9 December 2009 6	Stuttgart (Germany)	3–1	(Romania) Unirea Urziceni	Stuttgart, Germany
20:45 CET (UTC+1)	Marica 5'; Träsch 8'; Pogrebnyak 11'	Report	Semedo 46'	Stadium: Mercedes-Benz Arena; Attendance: 37,000; Referee: Viktor Kassai (Hungary)

=== UEFA Europa League ===
==== Knockout phase ====
===== Round of 32 =====
18 February 2010 First leg	Liverpool (England)	1–0	(Romania) Unirea Urziceni	Liverpool, England
20:05 WET (UTC±0)	Ngog 81'	Report		Stadium: Anfield; Attendance: 40,450; Referee: Eric Braamhaar (Netherlands)

25 February 2010 Second leg	Unirea Urziceni (Romania)	1–3 (1–4 agg.)	(England) Liverpool	Bucharest, Romania
20:00 EET (UTC+2)	Fernandes 19'	Report	Mascherano 30'; Babel 41'; Gerrard 57'	Stadium: Steaua; Attendance: 25,000; Referee: Stefan Johannesson (Sweden)

== Individual statistics ==
No.	Pos	Nat	Player	Total		Liga I		Champions League		Cupa României	
No.	Pos	Nat	Player	Apps	Goals	Apps	Goals	Apps	Goals	Apps	Goals
1	GK	(Lithuania) LTU	Giedrius Arlauskis	0	0	0	0	0	0	0	0
4	DF	(Serbia) SRB	Ersin Mehmedović	2	0	2	0	0	0	0	0
5	MF	(Romania) ROU	Dinu Todoran	0	0	0	0	0	0	0	0
6	DF	(Romania) ROU	George Galamaz (captain)	1	0	1	0	0	0	0	0
7	FW	(Romania) ROU	Marius Bilaşco	2	0	2	0	0	0	0	0
8	MF	(Romania) ROU	Sorin Paraschiv	1	0	1	0	0	0	0	0
10	MF	(Romania) ROU	Răzvan Pădureţu	2	1	2	1	0	0	0	0
11	FW	(Romania) ROU	Marius Onofraş	0	0	0	0	0	0	0	0
14	FW	(Romania) ROU	Raul Rusescu	2	0	2	0	0	0	0	0
15	FW	(Romania) ROU	Cristian Dănălache	1	0	1	0	0	0	0	0
16	DF	(Romania) ROU	Epaminonda Nicu	1	0	1	0	0	0	0	0
18	MF	(Brazil) BRA	Ricardo Vilana	1	0	1	0	0	0	0	0
19	MF	(Romania) ROU	Pablo Brandán	2	0	2	0	0	0	0	0
20	MF	(Romania) ROU	Laurenţiu Marinescu	0	0	0	0	0	0	0	0
22	DF	(Portugal) POR	Bruno Fernandes	1	0	1	0	0	0	0	0
23	DF	(Romania) ROU	Valeriu Bordeanu	2	0	2	0	0	0	0	0
24	DF	(Romania) ROU	Vasile Maftei	2	0	2	0	0	0	0	0
26	DF	(Romania) ROU	Dan Matei	0	0	0	0	0	0	0	0
28	FW	(Romania) ROU	Daniel Stan	0	0	0	0	0	0	0	0
30	MF	(Romania) ROU	Sorin Frunză	2	0	2	0	0	0	0	0
32	MF	(Romania) ROU	Iulian Apostol	2	0	2	0	0	0	0	0
74	GK	(Romania) ROU	Daniel Tudor	1	0	1	0	0	0	0	0
77	GK	(Romania) ROU	Cătălin Grigore	1	0	1	0	0	0	0	0
--	MF	(Portugal) POR	António Semedo	0	0	0	0	0	0	0	0

As of 9 August 2009

== Transfers ==
=== In ===
No.	Pos.	Nat.	Name	Age	EU	Moving from	Type	Transfer window	Ends	Transfer fee	Source
24	DF	(Romania)	Maftei	28	EU	Rapid București	Transfer	Summer	2012	€400,000	
8	MF	(Romania)	Paraschiv	28	EU	Rimini (Italy)	Transfer	Summer	2012	Free	
	FW	(Portugal)	Semedo	30	EU	Steaua București (Romania)	Transfer	Summer	2014	Free	

=== Out ===
No.	Pos.	Nat.	Name	Age	EU	Moving to	Type	Transfer window	Transfer fee	Source
–	DF	(Romania)	Rădoi	24	EU	Unirea Alba Iulia	Loan	Summer	n/a	

Last updated: 2009-08-09

=== Goals ===
Pos.	Player	L1	CL	Cup	Overall
1	(Romania) Răzvan Pădureţu	0	0	1	1

== Club ==
=== Coaching staff ===
Position	Staff
Head coach	(Romania) Dan Petrescu
Assistant coach 1	(Romania) Cristian Pojar
Fitness coach	(Italy) Michele Bon
Goalkeepers coach	(Romania) Dumitru Stângaciu
