= 2008 Cupa României final =

- Event: Cupa României 2007–08
CFR Cluj	Unirea Urziceni
Liga I	Liga I
2	1
- Date: 10 May 2008
- Venue: Stadionul Ceahlăul, Piatra Neamţ
- Referee: Aurelian Bogaciu (Romania)
- Attendance: 10,000

The 2008 Cupa României final was the 70 final of Romania's most prestigious cup competition. The final was played at the Stadionul Ceahlăul in Piatra Neamţ on 10 May 2008 and was contested between Liga I sides CFR Cluj and Unirea Urziceni. The cup was won by CFR Cluj who also won the Liga I title that year.

== Route to the final ==
CFR Cluj

Round of 32	FC Săcele	0–3	CFR Cluj
Round of 16	Jiul Petroşani	0–1	CFR Cluj
Quarter-finals	CFR Cluj	1–0	FC Brașov
Semi-finals	Dacia Mioveni	0–3	CFR Cluj

Unirea Urziceni

Round of 32	Baia Mare	1–4	Unirea Urziceni
Round of 16	Unirea Urziceni	2–0	Steaua București
Quarter-finals	Unirea Urziceni	1–0	Rapid București
Semi-finals	Gloria Buzău	0–1	Unirea Urziceni

== Match details ==
10 May 2008
20:45 EEST

CFR Cluj	2–1	Unirea Urziceni
Ruiz 49'; Semedo 64'	Report	Dănălache 58'

Stadionul Ceahlăul, Piatra Neamţ
Attendance: 10,000
Referee: Aurelian Bogaciu (Romania)

CFR Cluj	Unirea Urziceni

CFR Cluj:
GK	44	(Romania) Eduard Stăncioiu	(yellow card) 79'
DF	2	(France) Tony
DF	20	(Portugal) Cadú (c)
DF	27	(Brazil) André Galiassi
DF	4	(Romania) Cristian Panin
MF	5	(Portugal) Manuel José	(yellow card) 38'	(substituted off) 71'
MF	31	(Portugal) Dani
MF	8	(Argentina) Sixto Peralta	(yellow card) 81'	(substituted off) 81'
MF	19	(Argentina) Emmanuel Culio
FW	16	(Portugal) António Semedo
FW	99	(Argentina) Diego Ruiz	(yellow card) 63'	(substituted off) 77'
Substitutes:
GK	1	(Portugal) Nuno Claro
DF	6	(Romania) Gabriel Mureşan		(substituted in) 81'
DF	33	(Sweden) Mikael Dorsin
MF	7	(Argentina) Sebastián Dubarbier
MF	10	(Romania) Eugen Trică		(substituted in) 71'
MF	25	(Portugal) André Leão
FW	23	(Argentina) Cristian Fabbiani		(substituted in) 77'	(yellow card) 90'
Manager:
(Romania) Ioan Andone

Unirea Urziceni:
GK	12	(Romania) Bogdan Stelea (c)
DF	24	(Romania) László Balint
DF	6	(Romania) George Galamaz	(yellow card) 25'
MF	29	(Romania) Daniel Munteanu	(yellow card) 64'
DF	23	(Romania) Valeriu Bordeanu
FW	10	(Romania) Bogdan Mara		(substituted off) 74'
DF	19	(Argentina) Pablo Brandán
DF	3	(Brazil) Ricardo Vilana
MF	25	(Romania) Răzvan Pădureţu	(yellow card) 53'	(substituted off) 67'
MF	14	(Romania) Bogdan Stancu		(substituted off) 33'
FW	15	(Romania) Cristian Dănălache
Substitutes:
GK	77	(Romania) Cătălin Grigore
DF	3	(Serbia) Ersin Mehmedović
DF	16	(Romania) Epaminonda Nicu
MF	2	(Romania) Ciprian Petre
MF	9	(Romania) Valentin Negru		(substituted in) 67'
MF	11	(Romania) Marius Onofraş		(substituted in) 33'
FW	7	(Romania) Marius Bilaşco		(substituted in) 74'
Manager:
(Romania) Dan Petrescu

MATCH OFFICIALS

- Assistant referees:
  - (Romania) Marcel Savaniu
  - (Romania) Eduard Dumitrescu
- Fourth official:
  - (Romania) Istvan Kovacs

MAN OF THE MATCH

MATCH RULES

- 90 minutes.
- 30 minutes extra-time (15-minute intervals)
- Penalty shoot-out if scores level after extra time.
- Seven named substitutes
- Maximum of 3 substitutions.
