= Sebastián Dubarbier =

Argentine footballer (born 1986)

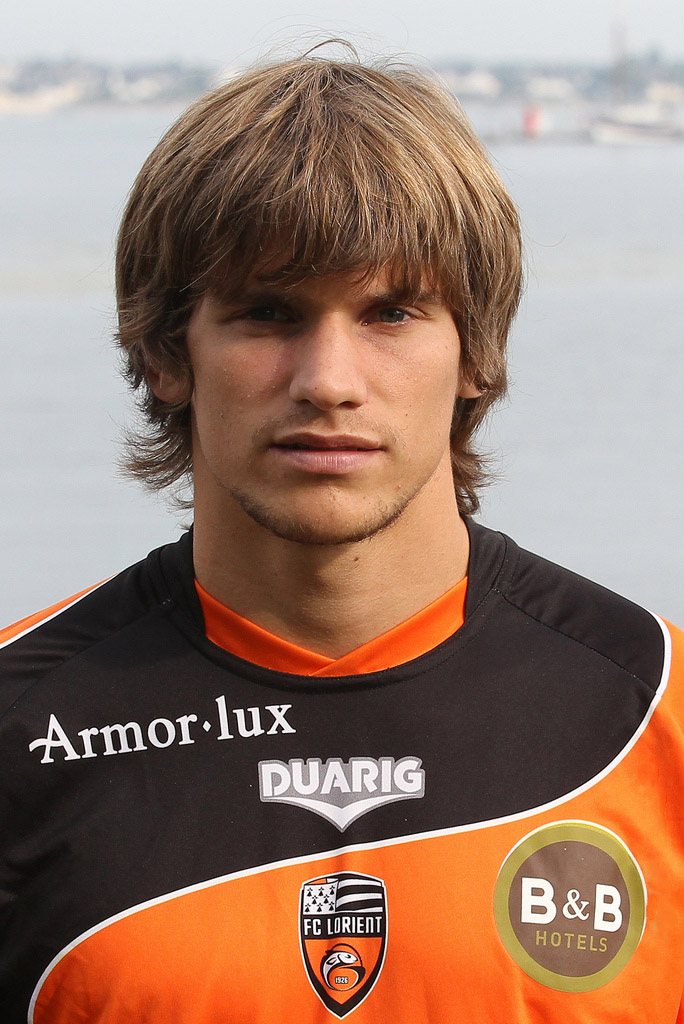
- Dubarbier as a Lorient player

Personal information
- Full name: Sebastián Rakán Dubarbier Bruschini
- Date of birth: 19 February 1986 (age 40)
- Place of birth: La Plata, Argentina
- Height: 1.77 m (5 ft 10 in)
- Positions: Midfielder; left back

Youth career
- Gimnasia

Senior career*
Years	Team	Apps	(Gls)
2006–2007	Gimnasia	20	(0)
2007	→ Olimpo (loan)	11	(0)
2008–2010	CFR Cluj	57	(11)
2010–2012	Lorient	19	(1)
2011	→ Tenerife (loan)	15	(1)
2012	→ Córdoba (loan)	19	(1)
2012–2013	Córdoba	34	(2)
2013–2016	Almería	92	(1)
2017–2018	Estudiantes	29	(2)
2018–2019	Deportivo La Coruña	0	(0)
2019–2020	Banfield	8	(0)
Total		304	(19)
- * Club domestic league appearances and goals

Sebastián Rakán Dubarbier Bruschini (born 19 February 1986) is an Argentine former professional footballer who played as a left midfielder or left back.

== Career ==
=== Gimnasia and Olimpo ===
Dubarbier was born on 19 February 1986 in La Plata, Buenos Aires Province, Argentina. He began playing football at local club Gimnasia where he made his Argentine Primera División debut on 13 May 2006 when coach Pedro Troglio sent him to replace Diego Herner in the 74th minute of a 2–0 home loss to Banfield. In the same year he made one appearance in the Copa Sudamericana in which he received a red card in the home loss to Colo-Colo. In the following year he played three games in the Copa Libertadores group stage. He went to play for the second half of 2007 on loan at Olimpo.

=== CFR Cluj ===
In January 2008, Dubarbier was transferred by CFR Cluj for €775,000 from Gimnasia, and was presented at a press conference alongside fellow Argentinian Diego Ruiz.

He made his Liga I debut on 23 February when coach Ioan Andone sent him in the 74th minute to replace André Leão in a 4–1 win over Universitatea Craiova. He scored his first goal in the league on 7 March in a 2–0 victory against Gloria Buzău, afterwards scoring in another two wins over UTA Arad and Gloria Bistrița. Dubarbier ended his first season with CFR by winning The Double, which constituted the club's first trophies, contributing with three goals in 15 league matches. However, in the 2–1 victory against Unirea Urziceni in the Cupa României final, coach Andone left him on the bench.

In the first round of the following season, Dubarbier scored a goal in the 4–0 success over Otopeni. Subsequently, he scored another four goals in the league by the end of the season against Farul Constanța, Steaua București, Gaz Metan Mediaș and Politehnica Timișoara, and with the exception of the draw against Steaua, all the other matches finished with victories. He also made six appearances in the 2008–09 Champions League group stage with The Railway Men, where in the first one the team earned a historical 2–1 victory at Stadio Olimpico against AS Roma. At the end of the season he helped the team win the Cupa României, when coach Toni Conceição sent him to replace Ciprian Deac in the 69th minute of the 3–0 win over Politehnica Timișoara in the final. The performances he achieved in 2008 earned him the Gazeta Sporturilor Foreign Player of the Year award.

Dubarbier started the 2009–10 season by winning the Supercupa României where coach Conceição sent him in the 68th minute to replace Bogdan Mara in the penalty shoot-out victory over Unirea Urziceni. Subsequently, he scored his first goal in the first round of the season in another win against Urziceni. By the end of the first half of the season he scored two more goals in two additional wins against FC Brașov and Astra Ploiești. He then was transferred in the middle of the season to Lorient, but CFR still managed to win the Double at the end of the season without him. He also made six appearances in the 2009–10 Europa League group stage, scoring a goal in a 3–2 loss to Sparta Prague, totaling 13 games with one goal scored in European competitions for CFR.

=== Lorient and loans ===
In February 2010, Dubarbier joined Ligue 1 side Lorient which paid CFR Cluj €2 million for his transfer, being presented by coach Christian Gourcuff at a press conference alongside Grégory Bourillon. He made his debut on 20 February in a 1–0 away loss to Nice, scoring his first goal on 28 March in a 4–0 home win over Saint-Étienne.

On 14 January of the following year he was loaned to Segunda División club Tenerife in Spain.

Dubarbier signed for fellow Segunda División club Córdoba on 30 January 2012, also on loan. The move was made permanent in August and he scored twice during the campaign to help the Andalusians rank in 14th position, being reconverted as a left back in the process.

=== Almería ===
On 28 June 2013, Dubarbier joined Almería in La Liga for an undisclosed fee. He made his debut in the Spanish top flight on 19 August, being used from the start by coach Francisco in a 3–2 home loss to Villarreal. On 4 January 2015, he scored his first goal in the Spanish top-league when he opened the score in a 3–0 home win over Granada.

On 24 July 2015, Dubarbier agreed to an extension with the Rojiblancos until 2019. However, on 7 December 2016, he terminated his contract after alleging personal problems and joined Estudiantes de La Plata two weeks later.

=== Late career ===
During his time spent at Estudiantes, Dubarbier scored his only two goals in the Argentine top-division in victories over Aldosivi and Godoy Cruz. He also played seven games in the Copa Libertadores group stage over the course of two seasons and made two appearances in the Copa Sudamericana.

Dubarbier returned to Spain on 15 June 2018, with the 32-year-old signing a one-year deal with Deportivo de La Coruña as a free agent. He left Galicia after only one match and retired in 2020 at Banfield where he made his last Argentine Primera División appearances, having a total of 69 games with two goals scored in the competition.

== Personal life ==
Dubarbier holds Italian nationality.

Both of his parents were athletes, as his mother practiced long jump, while his father was nine times champion of Argentina at 100 and 200 metres sprint, for a while holding the country's record for 100 metres with 10.4 seconds. Dubarbier himself was a player known for his speed, being known to run the 100 meters in 11 seconds, and for this performance he earned the nickname "Ghepardul" (The Cheetah) while he was playing in Romania.

In October 2008, while the 22-year-old Dubarbier was in Romania at CFR, he married Maria Minones in Cluj-Napoca in the same day as teammate and compatriot Cristian Sánchez Prette, with the city's mayor Emil Boc officiating the ceremony. Dubarbier claims he met Maria when they were both 14 years old in his native town of La Plata while he was wearing a Romania's national team t-shirt with Gheorghe Hagi's name on it.

After ending his playing career, Dubarbier began singing rock music under the stage name "Seba Dubar".

== Honours ==
CFR Cluj

- Liga I: 2007–08, 2009–10
- Cupa României: 2007–08, 2008–09, 2009–10
- Supercupa României: 2009

Individual

- Gazeta Sporturilor Foreign Player of the Year: 2008
