= 2009 Supercupa României =

- Event: Supercupa României 2009
Unirea Urziceni	CFR Cluj
Liga I	Cupa României
1	1
- CFR won 2–1 on penalties
- Date: 26 July 2009
- Venue: Stadionul Giuleşti-Valentin Stănescu, Bucharest
- Man of the Match: (Romania) Sorin Frunză
- Referee: Georgian Ionescu (Romania)
- Attendance: 2,500
- Weather: Clear night 25 °C (77 °F); 70% humidity

The 2009 Supercupa României was the 11th edition of Romania's season opener cup competition. The match was played in Bucharest at Stadionul Giuleşti-Valentin Stănescu on 26 July 2009, and was contested between Liga I title holders, FC Unirea Urziceni and Cupa României champions, CFR Cluj. The winner, after penalties, was CFR Cluj. CFR was the first club not from Bucharest to claim the trophy since its establishment in 1994. The trophy was handed to the winners by Romania national football team coach, Răzvan Lucescu.

== Match ==
=== Details ===
26 July 2009
21:00 EEST

Unirea Urziceni	1–1 (a.e.t.)	CFR Cluj
Frunză 50'	Report	Cadú 41'
Penalties
Pădureţu (penalty missed); Rusescu (penalty missed); Frunză (penalty missed); Bilaşco (penalty scored); Bordeanu (penalty scored)	2–3	(penalty scored) Alcântara; (penalty missed) Dubarbier; (penalty missed) Culio; (penalty scored) Dani; (penalty scored) Cadú

Stadionul Giuleşti-Valentin Stănescu, Bucharest
Attendance: 2,500
Referee: Georgian Ionescu (Romania)

Unirea Urziceni	CFR Cluj

UNIREA URZICENI:
GK	77	(Romania) Cătălin Grigore
DF	24	(Romania) Vasile Maftei	(yellow card) 16'	(substituted off) 100'
DF	6	(Romania) George Galamaz (c)
DF	22	(Guinea-Bissau) Bruno Fernandes
DF	23	(Romania) Valeriu Bordeanu
MF	32	(Romania) Iulian Apostol	(yellow card) 90'
MF	8	(Romania) Sorin Paraschiv	(yellow card) 3'	(substituted off) 81'
DF	19	(Argentina) Pablo Brandán		(substituted off) 62'
MF	30	(Romania) Sorin Frunză
FW	7	(Romania) Marius Bilaşco	(yellow card) 10'
FW	14	(Romania) Raul Rusescu
Substitutes:
GK	12	(Romania) Daniel Tudor
DF	3	(Brazil) Ricardo Gomes		(substituted in) 81'
DF	4	(Serbia) Ersin Mehmedović
FW	11	(Romania) Marius Onofraş
FW	15	(Romania) Cristian Dănălache
DF	16	(Romania) Epaminonda Nicu		(substituted in) 100'
MF	25	(Romania) Răzvan Pădureţu	(yellow card) 113'	(substituted in) 62'
Manager:
(Romania) Dan Petrescu

CFR CLUJ:
GK	1	(Portugal) Nuno Claro
RB	2	(France) Tony
CB	20	(Portugal) Cadú (c)
CB	15	(Brazil) Hugo Alcântara
LB	4	(Romania) Cristian Panin
DM	31	(Portugal) Dani
CM	19	(Argentina) Emmanuel Culio	(yellow card) 55'
CM	8	(Argentina) Sixto Peralta	(yellow card) 3'	(substituted off) 68'
LM	77	(Romania) Ciprian Deac	(yellow card) 45+1' (yellow-red card) 115'
CF	99	(Argentina) Diego Ruiz		(substituted off) 81'
RM	23	(Romania) Bogdan Mara	(yellow card) 32'	(substituted off) 68'
Substitutes:
GK	44	(Romania) Eduard Stăncioiu
CB	6	(Romania) Gabriel Mureşan
CM	7	(Argentina) Sebastián Dubarbier		(substituted in) 68'
CF	9	(Ivory Coast) Lacina Traoré
AM	10	(Romania) Eugen Trică	(yellow card) 72'	(substituted in) 68'
CF	17	(Burkina Faso) Yssouf Koné		(substituted in) 81'
CM	25	(Portugal) André Leão
Manager:
(Portugal) Toni

MATCH OFFICIALS

- Assistant referees:
  - Cristian Nica
  - Aurel Oniţa
- Fourth official:
  - Andrei Chivulete

MAN OF THE MATCH

- (Romania) Sorin Frunză

MATCH RULES

- 90 minutes.
- 30 minutes extra-time (15 minute intervals)
- Penalty shoot-out if scores level after extra time.
- Seven named substitutes
- Maximum of 3 substitutions.

== See also ==
- 2009–10 Liga I
- 2009–10 Cupa României
