= Raul Rusescu =

Romanian footballer (born 1988)

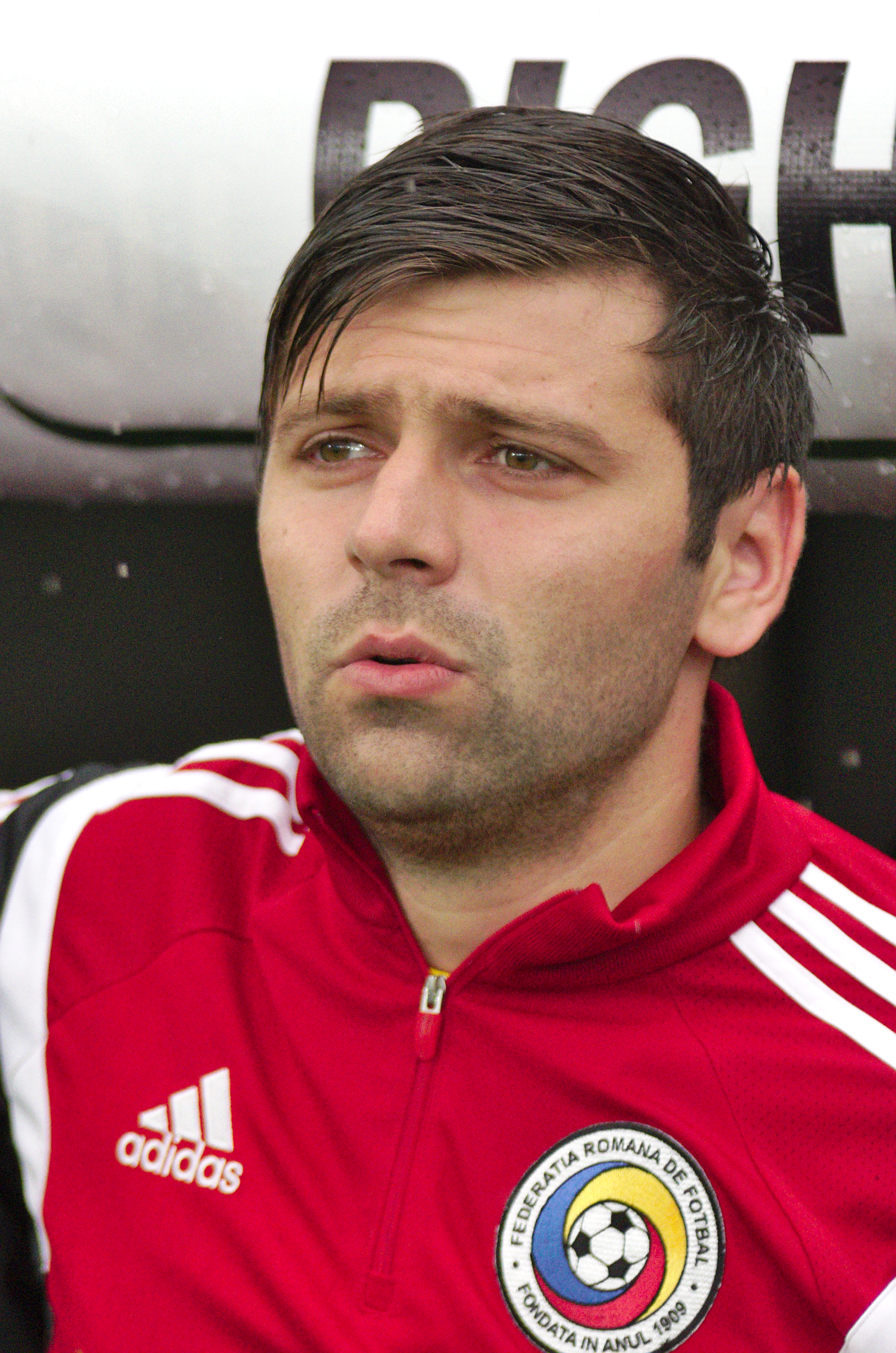
- Rusescu with Romania in 2014

Personal information
- Full name: Raul Andrei Rusescu
- Date of birth: 9 July 1988 (age 38)
- Place of birth: Râmnicu Vâlcea, Romania
- Height: 1.81 m (5 ft 11 in)
- Positions: Forward; attacking midfielder

Team information
- Current team: FCSB (head of youth development)

Youth career
- 1995–1997: FC Teleșpan
- 1997–2004: Sporting Râmnicu Vâlcea
- 2004–2005: CSM Râmnicu Vâlcea

Senior career*
Years	Team	Apps	(Gls)
2004–2005	CSM Râmnicu Vâlcea	0	(0)
2005–2011	Unirea Urziceni	87	(18)
2006–2007	→ Dunărea Giurgiu (loan)	31	(13)
2007–2008	→ Otopeni (loan)	20	(4)
2011–2013	Steaua București	65	(34)
2013–2015	Sevilla	1	(0)
2014	→ Braga (loan)	13	(5)
2014–2015	→ Steaua București (loan)	21	(4)
2015–2018	Osmanlıspor	46	(10)
2018–2019	FCSB	19	(4)
2019–2020	Giresunspor	30	(12)
2020–2021	Academica Clinceni	29	(6)
2021–2022	Lamezia Terme	18	(3)
2022–2023	Concordia Chiajna	18	(4)
Total		398	(117)

International career
2006–2007	Romania U19	6	(3)
2008–2010	Romania U21	7	(2)
2012–2016	Romania	12	(1)

Managerial career
- 2026–: FCSB (head of youth development)
- * Club domestic league appearances and goals

Raul Andrei Rusescu (born 9 July 1988) is a Romanian former professional footballer who played as a forward, currently head of youth development at Liga I club FCSB .

== Club career ==
=== CSM Râmnicu Vâlcea ===
At age seven, Rusescu was spotted by Cristi Bora at a trial and brought to Râmnicu Vâlcea. As a youth, he tore open his calf when he fell out of a bus, and then, subsequently, he broke his tibia falling down on ice. While at the club, he was group teammate with later Steaua București colleague Mihai Costea. Although he went through the youth system of CSM Râmnicu Vâlcea, in 2005 the coach of the team, Adrian Furnică, decided that Rusescu did not have enough value and that he was not likely to grow.

=== Unirea Urziceni ===
In the summer of 2005, Rusescu was brought to Liga II side Unirea Urziceni under the command of Dan Petrescu. He had limited playing time in his first year with the team while they earned promotion to the Liga I.

His team now being in the first tier of Romanian football, Rusescu was loaned to Dunărea Giurgiu. Although not yet 18, he quickly became a starter and finished the season with 13 goals scored across all competitions. For the 2007–08 season he was again loaned out, to Liga II club CS Otopeni. He helped the club gain promotion to the Liga I by scoring 4 goals in 20 matches.

In his first year in Liga I with Unirea Urziceni, Rusescu helped his team win the 2008–09 league title, earning a place in the group stages of the UEFA Champions League. He finished the season with 5 goals scored in 23 games.

In the 2009–10 campaign, Rusescu scored 8 goals from 29 total appearances, helping Unirea Urziceni finish second in the league and gather eight points in the 2009–10 Champions League group stage.

After manager Dan Petrescu left the club, Rusescu was used as a winger and did not perform as well as before.

=== Steaua București ===
On 4 May 2011, the owner of Steaua București announced at a televised show that Rusescu has signed with the club. Rusescu made his Liga I debut with Steaua on 31 July against CS Mioveni, also scoring his first Steaua goal. In the next match, Rusescu scored his second goal for the club against Universitatea Cluj. He scored his first European goal for Steaua against Schalke 04 in the 2011–12 UEFA Europa League.

On 5 December, Rusescu scored two sensational goals against Steaua's arch-rival Dinamo București, assuring his club a win in a match named by the two club's supporters the Eternal Derby and ending Steaua's seven-year winless streak on Dinamo's stadium. He has been deemed a hero by the Steaua supporters and the press. In the next Europa League group stage match, Rusescu scored again for Steaua from a penalty kick, helping his club beat AEK Larnaca and qualifying for the round of 32. At the end of 2011, Rusescu was Steaua's most prolific goalscorer with seven goals in Liga I and two in the Europa League group stage.

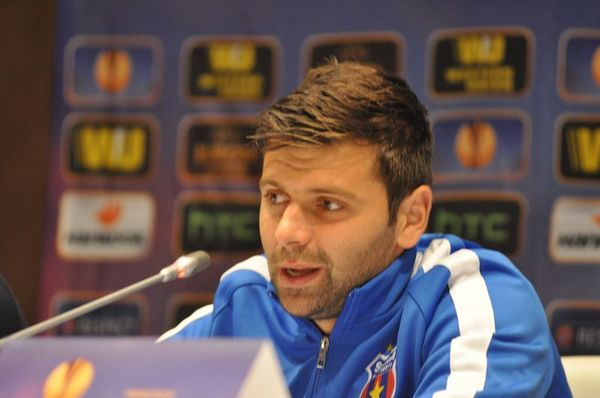
Rusescu in 2014 during his second spell at Steaua Bucharest

On 7 March 2013, Rusescu scored from the penalty spot against Chelsea at the National Arena, to put Steaua 1–0 up in the Europa League round of 16. On 12 March, Rusescu scored a goal against Universitatea Cluj. He scored again, on 18 March, against Astra Ploiești in a game which finished 2–1, with teammate Paul Pârvulescu scoring the winning goal. On 8 April, Rusescu scored the second goal from the 4–1 victory against Sportul Studențesc.

=== Sevilla and loans ===
On 13 June 2013, Rusescu completed a move to Spanish La Liga club Sevilla, signing a five-year contract which included a €40 million release clause. On 20 August 2015, Sevilla announced that Rusescu had terminated his contract with the club.

At the end of 2013, Rusescu was loaned at Portuguese Primeira Liga club Braga, with an option to purchase outright. He made his Braga debut on 6 January 2014 in a 2–0 win against Arouca in the Taça de Portugal. On 10 January, he scored two goals for Braga in his Primeira Liga debut, a 3–0 win over Vitória de Guimarães.

On 1 September 2014, just one year after being sold by FCSB to Sevilla, Rusescu returned for a season-long loan.

== International career ==
Rusescu is an ex-Romania U-21 international, earning seven caps and scoring two goals. He played in the 2011 UEFA European Under-21 Football Championship, losing in the play-offs against England.

== Career statistics ==
=== Club ===
Appearances and goals by club, season and competition
Club	Season	League			National cup (Note: Includes Cupa României, Copa del Rey, Taça de Portugal, Turkish Cup)		League cup (Note: Includes Taça da Liga, Cupa Ligii)		Europe		Other		Total	
Club	Season	Division	Apps	Goals	Apps	Goals	Apps	Goals	Apps	Goals	Apps	Goals	Apps	Goals
CSM Râmnicu Vâlcea	2004–05	Divizia C	0	0	—		—		—		—		0	0
Unirea Urziceni	2005–06	Divizia B	9	2	0	0	—		—		—		9	2
Unirea Urziceni	2008–09	Liga I	23	5	2	1	—		—		—		25	6
Unirea Urziceni	2009–10	Liga I	26	8	1	0	—		3 (Note: Two appearances in UEFA Champions League, one appearance in UEFA Europa League)	0	1 (Note: Appearance in Supercupa României)	0	31	8
Unirea Urziceni	2010–11	Liga I	29	3	1	0	—		4 (Note: Two appearances in UEFA Champions League, two appearances in UEFA Europa League)	0	0	0	34	3
Unirea Urziceni	Total		87	18	4	1	—		7	0	1	0	99	19
Dunărea Giurgiu (loan)	2006–07	Liga II	31	13	1	1	—		—		—		32	14
Otopeni (loan)	2007–08	Liga II	20	4	0	0	—		—		—		20	4
Steaua București	2011–12	Liga I	31	13	2	0	—		9 (Note: Appearances in UEFA Europa League)	2	1	0	43	15
Steaua București	2012–13	Liga I	34	21	0	0	—		13	5	—		47	26
Steaua București	Total		65	34	2	0	0	0	22	7	1	0	90	41
Sevilla	2013–14	La Liga	1	0	2	0	—		4	3	—		7	3
Braga (loan)	2013–14	Primeira Liga	13	5	4	1	3	2	—		—		20	8
Steaua București (loan)	2014–15	Liga I	21	4	5	2	3	2	4	5	—		33	13
Osmanlıspor	2015–16	Süper Lig	24	9	2	1	—		—		—		26	10
Osmanlıspor	2016–17	Süper Lig	22	1	5	2	—		12	4	—		39	7
Osmanlıspor	2017–18	Süper Lig	0	0	0	0	—		—		—		0	0
Osmanlıspor	Total		46	10	7	3	—		12	4	0	0	65	17
FCSB	2018–19	Liga I	19	4	2	1	—		3	0	—		24	5
Giresunspor	2019–20	TFF First League	30	12	1	0	—		—		—		32	12
Academica Clinceni	2020–21	Liga I	29	6	1	0	—		—		—		30	6
Lamezia Terme	2021–22	Serie D	18	3	—		—		—		1 (Note: Appearances in Serie D promotion play-offs)	0	19	3
Concordia Chiajna	2022–23	Liga II	18	4	2	0	—		—		—		20	4
Career total			398	117	31	9	6	4	52	19	3	0	490	149

=== International ===
Appearances and goals by national team and year
National team	Year	Apps	Goals
Romania	2012	1	0
Romania	2013	1	0
Romania	2014	5	1
Romania	2015	3	0
Romania	2016	2	0
Total		12	1

Score and result list Romania's goal tally first, score column indicates score after Rusescu goal.

International goal scored by Raul Rusescu
No.	Date	Venue	Opponent	Score	Result	Competition
1	11 October 2014	Arena Națională, Bucharest, Romania	Hungary	1–1	1–1	UEFA Euro 2016 qualification

== Honours ==
CSM Râmnicu Vâlcea

- Divizia C: 2004–05

Unirea Urziceni

- Liga I: 2008–09
- Supercupa României runner-up: 2009, 2010

Steaua București

- Liga I: 2012–13, 2014–15
- Cupa României: 2014–15
- Cupa Ligii: 2014–15
- Supercupa României runner-up: 2011

Individual

- Gazeta Sporturilor Romanian Footballer of the Year: 2012
- Liga I top scorer: 2012–13 (21 goals)
