= 2007–08 Liga I =

90th season of top-tier football league in Romania

Liga I
- Season: 2007–08
- Champions: CFR Cluj
- Relegated: Ceahlăul Piatra Neamț; Dacia Mioveni; UTA Arad; Universitatea Cluj
- Champions League: CFR Cluj; Steaua București
- UEFA Cup: Rapid București; Dinamo București; Urziceni Urziceni; Politehnica Știința Timișoara
- Intertoto Cup: Vaslui
- Matches: 306
- Goals: 725 (2.37 per match)
- Top goalscorer: Ionel Dănciulescu (21)
- Biggest home win: Dinamo 6–1 Oțelul; Steaua 5–0 Buzău
- Biggest away win: Buzău 0–4 Oțelul
- Highest scoring: Dinamo 4–4 Craiova
- Longest winning run: Steaua (10)
- Longest unbeaten run: CFR (18)
- Longest winless run: Pandurii (17)
- Longest losing run: Craiova, Pandurii (7)

The 2007–08 Liga I was the ninety season of Liga I, the top-level football league of Romania. Season began on 27 July 2007 and ended on 7 May 2008. CFR Cluj became champions, winning their first trophy and ending a 17-year-long reign of Bucharest based teams.

CFR Cluj will play in the Champions League group stage, while Steaua București qualified for the Champions League third qualifying round. Rapid București, Dinamo București, Unirea Urziceni and Politehnica Știința Timișoara qualified for the UEFA Cup first round. The highest placed team that has not qualified for the UEFA Cup is allowed the opportunity to compete in the third round of the UEFA Intertoto Cup, provided they have applied to enter the Intertoto Cup in the next season. Vaslui, Oțelul Galați and Gloria Bistrița are the only teams that have applied, with Vaslui securing their participation.

== Teams ==
Promoted from Liga II
- Gloria Buzău
  (after 20 years of absence)
- Universitatea Cluj
  (after 8 years of absence)
- Dacia Mioveni
  (debut)

Relegated from Liga I
- Progresul București
  (ended 15-year stay)
- Argeș Pitești
  (ended 13-year stay)
- Jiul Petroșani
  (ended 2-year stay)

=== Venues ===
Politehnica Timișoara	Steaua București	FC U Craiova	Gloria Buzău
Dan Păltinișanu	Steaua	Ion Oblemenco	Municipal
Capacity: 32,972	Capacity: 28,365	Capacity: 25,252	Capacity: 18,000
Ceahlăul Piatra Neamț	Farul Constanța	Dinamo București	Oțelul Galați
Ceahlăul	Farul	Dinamo	Oțelul
Capacity: 17,500	Capacity: 15,520	Capacity: 15,032	Capacity: 13,500
CFR Cluj	2007–08 Liga I (Romania) Location of Bucharest teams.		Rapid București
Dr. Constantin Rădulescu	2007–08 Liga I (Romania) Location of Bucharest teams.		Giulești-Valentin Stănescu
Capacity: 12,813	2007–08 Liga I (Romania) Location of Bucharest teams.		Capacity: 11,704 (Note: Capacity of Giulești-Valentin Stănescu Stadium has been reduced from 19,100 to 11,704 due to advanced degradation of the resistance structure of the South End.)
Politehnica Iași	2007–08 Liga I (Romania) Location of Bucharest teams.		FC Vaslui
Emil Alexandrescu	2007–08 Liga I (Romania) Location of Bucharest teams.		Municipal
Capacity: 11,390	2007–08 Liga I (Romania) Location of Bucharest teams.		Capacity: 9,240
Pandurii Târgu Jiu	2007–08 Liga I (Romania) Location of Bucharest teams.		Gloria Bistrița (Note: Gloria Bistrița was relocated to Municipal Stadium from Reghin for the second part of this season because Gloria Stadium was under renovations.)
Tudor Vladimirescu	2007–08 Liga I (Romania) Location of Bucharest teams.		Gloria
Capacity: 9,200	2007–08 Liga I (Romania) Location of Bucharest teams.		Capacity: 7,800
Universitatea Cluj	UTA Arad	Dacia Mioveni	Unirea Urziceni
Ion Moina	Francisc von Neuman	Orășenesc	Tineretului
Capacity: 7,600 (Note: Capacity of Ion Moina Stadium has been reduced from 28,000 to 7,600 due to advanced degradation of the resistance structure.)	Capacity: 7,287	Capacity: 7,000	Capacity: 7,000

=== Personnel and kits ===
Team	Head coach	Captain	Kit manufacturer	Shirt Sponsor
Ceahlăul Piatra Neamț	(Romania) Viorel Hizo	(Romania) Alexandru Forminte	Lotto	Altex
CFR Cluj	(Romania) Ioan Andone	(Portugal) Cadú	Nike	Polus Center
Dacia Mioveni	(Romania) Sorin Cârțu	(Ivory Coast) Mariko Daouda	Umbro	Consiliul Local Mioveni
Dinamo București	(Romania) Cornel Țălnar	(Romania) Bogdan Lobonț	Nike	Orange
Farul Constanța	(Romania) Marin Ion	(Romania) Cristian Șchiopu	Umbro	SNC
FC U Craiova	(Italy) Nicolò Napoli	(Romania) Dorel Stoica	Adidas	editie.ro
Gloria Bistrița	(Romania) Ioan Sabău	(Romania) Sandu Negrean	Puma	Darimex
Gloria Buzău	(Romania) Ștefan Stoica	(Romania) Alexandru Tudose	Hummel	Avicola Buzău
Oțelul Galați	(Romania) Petre Grigoraș	(Romania) Gabriel Paraschiv	Nike	ArcelorMittal
Pandurii Târgu Jiu	(Romania) Eugen Neagoe	(Romania) Florin Stângă	Uhlsport	USMO
Politehnica Iași	(Romania) Ionuț Popa	(Romania) Bogdan Onuț	Umbro	Iulius Mall
Politehnica Timișoara	(Czech Republic) Dušan Uhrin Jr.	(Romania) Ionel Ganea	Lotto	Balkan Petroleum
Rapid București	(Romania) Marian Rada	(Romania) Vasile Maftei	Lotto	Holsten
Steaua București	(Romania) Marius Lăcătuș	(Romania) Mirel Rădoi	Nike	CitiFinancial
Unirea Urziceni	(Romania) Dan Petrescu	(Romania) George Galamaz	Joma	Primăria Voluntari
Universitatea Cluj	(Romania) Alpár Mészáros	(Romania) Dorin Goga	Diadora	Banca Transilvania, Oncos
UTA Arad	(Romania) Ionuț Chirilă	(Romania) Cristian Todea	Uhlsport	Intesa Sanpaolo
Vaslui	(Romania) Emil Săndoi	(Romania) Sorin Frunză	Umbro	Deutz-Fahr

== League table ==
Pos	Team	Pld	W	D	L	GF	GA	GD	Pts	Qualification or relegation
1	CFR Cluj (C)	34	23	7	4	52	22	+30	76	Qualification to Champions League group stage
2	Steaua București	34	23	6	5	51	19	+32	75	Qualification to Champions League third qualifying round
3	Rapid București	34	18	7	9	52	31	+21	61 (Note: RAP: 7 pts; DIN: 5 pts; UNI: 3 pts)	Qualification to UEFA Cup first round
4	Dinamo București	34	17	10	7	55	36	+19	61	Qualification to UEFA Cup first round
5	Unirea Urziceni	34	16	13	5	42	24	+18	61	Qualification to UEFA Cup first round
6	Politehnica Timișoara	34	16	9	9	57	44	+13	57	Qualification to UEFA Cup first round
7	Vaslui	34	12	11	11	44	34	+10	47	Qualification to Intertoto Cup third round
8	Oțelul Galați	34	14	4	16	47	50	−3	46	
9	FC U Craiova	34	12	7	15	42	48	−6	43	
10	Gloria Bistrița	34	11	9	14	34	40	−6	42	
11	Politehnica Iași	34	11	8	15	37	41	−4	41	
12	Pandurii Târgu Jiu	34	11	7	16	36	43	−7	40 (Note: PAN 0-1 FAR; FAR 1-2 PAN)	
13	Farul Constanța	34	10	10	14	25	38	−13	40	
14	Gloria Buzău	34	10	7	17	30	56	−26	37	
15	Ceahlăul Piatra Neamț (R)	34	10	6	18	33	46	−13	36	Relegation to Liga II
16	Dacia Mioveni (R)	34	7	10	17	26	43	−17	31	Relegation to Liga II
17	UTA Arad (R)	34	6	8	20	30	52	−22	26	Relegation to Liga II
18	Universitatea Cluj (R)	34	4	11	19	32	58	−26	23	Relegation to Liga II

Source: LT (in Romanian)
Rules for classification: 1) points; 2) head-to-head points; 3) head-to-head goal difference; 4) head-to-head goals scored; 5) goal difference; 6) number of goals scored.
(C) Champions; (R) Relegated

=== Positions by round ===
Team ╲ Round	1	2	3	4	5	6	7	8	9	10	11	12	13	14	15	16	17	18	19	20	21	22	23	24	25	26	27	28	29	30	31	32	33	34
CFR Cluj	6	6	3	4	3	3	1	1	1	1	1	1	1	1	1	1	1	1	1	1	1	1	1	1	1	1	1	2	2	2	1	2	1	1
Ceahlăul Piatra Neamț	13	9	12	13	11	11	10	12	13	9	9	10	9	9	10	10	11	10	13	12	14	15	15	16	16	17	17	16	16	16	15	15	15	15
FC U Craiova	1	10	11	12	14	16	18	18	17	14	12	16	12	12	14	11	13	14	11	13	11	11	11	10	10	9	9	9	8	8	8	9	11	9
Dacia Mioveni	14	15	17	18	18	14	14	15	16	17	16	11	11	10	12	12	10	11	12	14	15	14	14	12	12	12	13	13	15	15	16	16	16	16
Dinamo București	3	12	5	6	6	9	6	4	6	5	4	5	4	5	6	7	6	5	6	6	6	6	6	6	3	4	4	5	5	5	4	4	4	4
Farul Constanța	18	18	18	15	15	15	15	14	15	16	14	14	13	15	16	17	17	15	16	16	13	13	12	13	15	15	15	14	13	13	12	10	12	13
Gloria Bistrița	7	13	7	11	9	8	8	7	8	8	8	8	8	8	8	8	8	8	8	8	8	8	8	8	8	8	8	8	9	9	13	11	13	10
Gloria Buzău	15	17	15	16	16	17	16	16	14	15	17	17	16	13	11	13	12	13	10	11	12	12	13	14	13	14	14	15	14	14	14	14	14	14
Oțelul Galați	16	16	13	14	12	12	11	11	9	10	10	9	10	11	9	9	9	9	9	9	9	9	9	9	9	10	10	10	10	10	9	8	8	8
Pandurii Târgu Jiu	11	8	10	8	8	5	9	9	10	11	11	12	14	14	15	15	15	16	17	17	18	18	17	15	14	13	11	11	11	12	10	12	10	12
Politehnica Iași	17	11	14	9	10	10	13	13	11	12	13	13	15	17	13	14	14	12	14	10	10	10	10	11	11	11	12	12	12	11	11	13	9	11
Rapid București	4	5	4	1	2	2	2	5	3	3	2	3	2	2	2	2	2	2	2	2	2	2	3	3	4	3	3	3	3	3	3	3	3	3
Steaua București	5	1	1	2	4	7	7	8	7	7	6	7	7	7	5	5	5	4	4	5	3	3	2	2	2	2	2	1	1	1	2	1	2	2
Politehnica Știința Timișoara	2	2	2	7	7	6	5	6	4	4	3	4	6	3	4	4	3	6	5	4	5	4	4	4	6	6	5	6	6	6	6	6	6	6
Universitatea Cluj	12	14	16	17	17	18	17	17	18	18	18	18	18	18	18	18	18	18	18	18	17	17	18	18	18	18	18	17	18	17	18	18	18	18
UTA Arad	8	7	9	10	13	13	12	10	12	13	15	15	17	16	17	16	16	17	15	15	16	16	16	17	17	16	16	18	17	18	17	17	17	17
Unirea Urziceni	9	4	8	5	5	4	4	3	2	2	5	2	3	4	3	3	4	3	3	3	4	5	5	5	5	5	6	4	4	4	5	5	5	5
Vaslui	10	3	6	3	1	1	3	2	5	6	7	6	5	6	7	6	7	7	7	7	7	7	7	7	7	7	7	7	7	7	7	7	7	7

Source: LT (in Romanian)

=== Results ===
Home \ Away	CFR	CEA	UCR	MIO	DIN	FAR	GBI	GBU	OȚE	PAN	PIA	RAP	STE	TIM	UCL	UTA	URZ	VAS
CFR Cluj	—	2–1	4–1	1–0	1–1	2–1	1–0	2–0	3–1	1–2	2–1	1–0	0–0	2–2	2–0	2–0	2–0	1–0
Ceahlăul Piatra Neamț	0–0	—	1–0	1–1	0–3	0–1	2–0	4–0	0–1	2–1	1–0	0–1	0–1	2–1	3–0	1–1	0–0	1–1
FC U Craiova	1–3	3–2	—	1–0	1–1	4–0	1–1	3–1	1–1	1–0	2–1	1–1	1–2	2–1	1–1	0–1	0–1	2–1
Dacia Mioveni	0–0	2–1	1–2	—	1–2	2–3	0–0	0–0	1–0	1–1	2–1	1–2	1–2	2–2	1–0	0–1	0–3	2–2
Dinamo București	1–2	2–1	4–4	1–1	—	0–0	0–1	2–0	6–1	1–2	2–1	0–2	2–1	1–1	2–1	3–1	1–1	0–2
Farul Constanța	0–2	2–0	3–1	1–1	0–1	—	1–0	0–0	0–2	1–2	1–1	0–0	0–1	1–1	0–0	1–0	0–1	2–1
Gloria Bistrița	2–2	0–1	0–1	1–0	1–1	1–0	—	3–2	2–1	3–1	2–0	1–2	1–3	0–0	2–0	2–1	2–2	0–0
Gloria Buzău	1–2	4–1	1–0	0–1	1–2	1–0	1–0	—	0–4	1–3	1–1	1–0	1–1	2–1	3–2	1–0	0–0	1–1
Oțelul Galați	0–1	4–1	2–1	3–1	0–1	2–0	2–0	2–3	—	3–1	0–0	0–1	0–1	3–1	2–1	2–1	3–2	0–3
Pandurii Târgu Jiu	0–1	1–0	2–0	1–0	0–1	0–1	1–3	3–0	1–0	—	1–0	1–3	0–1	1–3	2–2	2–1	1–1	1–1
Politehnica Iași	1–0	1–0	2–1	1–0	2–5	1–1	2–0	3–0	2–2	1–0	—	0–2	2–1	2–1	3–0	4–1	2–3	0–1
Rapid București	1–2	5–1	2–0	3–0	1–2	2–0	2–2	0–0	4–2	1–0	3–0	—	0–3	0–1	1–2	2–3	1–1	2–1
Steaua București	3–1	2–1	1–0	2–0	1–0	3–0	1–0	5–0	3–1	0–0	1–0	0–0	—	1–1	4–0	2–1	1–0	1–0
Politehnica Știința Timișoara	1–0	3–2	1–3	1–2	1–1	4–1	3–1	1–0	4–1	3–1	3–1	1–1	2–0	—	3–0	2–0	0–0	2–1
Universitatea Cluj	0–1	1–1	2–0	0–0	1–2	1–2	2–2	1–2	2–1	1–1	1–1	1–2	2–1	1–2	—	2–2	0–2	2–3
UTA Arad	0–3	0–1	0–1	1–0	1–3	0–1	0–1	2–1	0–1	3–3	0–0	1–0	1–1	2–3	1–1	—	1–2	1–1
Unirea Urziceni	1–1	2–0	2–2	0–2	0–0	0–0	2–0	2–0	0–0	1–0	1–0	0–1	1–0	4–1	3–2	1–0	—	2–0
Vaslui	0–2	0–1	2–0	3–0	2–1	1–1	2–0	4–1	2–0	1–0	0–0	2–4	0–1	3–0	0–0	2–2	1–1	—

Source: LT (in Romanian)
Legend: Blue = home team win; Yellow = draw; Red = away team win.

== Top goalscorers ==
Rank	Player	Club	Goals
1	(Romania) Ionel Dănciulescu	Dinamo București	21
2	(Romania) Emil Jula	Oțelul Galați	17
3	(Romania) Gigel Bucur	Politehnica Timișoara	16
3	(Serbia) Marko Ljubinković	Vaslui	16
5	(Romania) Florin Costea	FC U Craiova	15
6	(Romania) Florin Bratu	Dinamo București	14
7	(Romania) Eugen Trică	CFR Cluj	13
8	(Romania) Cristian Coroian	Gloria Bistrița	11
8	(Argentina) Cristian Fabbiani	CFR Cluj	11
10	(Romania) Ionuț Mazilu	Rapid București	9
10	(Romania) Nicolae Dică	Steaua București	9
10	(Romania) Cristian Dănălache	Unirea Urziceni	9

== Champion squad ==
CFR Cluj

Goalkeepers: Nuno Claro (Portugal) (15 / 0); Lars Hirschfeld (Canada) (5 / 0); Eduard Stăncioiu (15 / 0).
Defenders: Eurípedes Amoreirinha (Portugal) (2 / 0); Ricardo Cadú (Portugal) (29 / 4); Mikael Dorsin (Sweden) (8 / 1); Fredy (Portugal) (1 / 0); Gabriel Mureșan (22 / 0); Cristian Panin (28 / 1); Niklas Sandberg (Sweden) (10 / 1); André Galiassi (Brazil) (28 / 0); Tony (Portugal) (32 / 1).
Midfielders: Emmanuel Culio (Argentina) (32 / 1); Dani (Portugal) (29 / 1); Ciprian Deac (10 / 0); Sebastián Dubarbier (Argentina) (15 / 3); Manuel José Vieira (Portugal) (20 / 0); André Leão (Portugal) (15 / 0); Alin Minteuan (18 / 0); Pedro Oliveira (Portugal) (1 / 0); Sixto Peralta (Argentina) (8 / 0); Eugen Trică (30 / 13).
Forwards: Adrian Anca (5 / 0); Nicolás Canales (Chile) (1 / 0); Didi (Brazil) (18 / 7); Cristian Fabbiani (Argentina) (28 / 11); Ibezito Ogbonna (Nigeria) (2 / 0); Diego Ruíz (Argentina) (13 / 2); António Semedo (Portugal) (33 / 6).
(league appearances and goals listed in brackets)

Manager: Ioan Andone.

== Notes ==
^{(1)} Delta Tulcea won the first serie of Liga II, but did not apply for the license necessary for playing in Liga I in the 2007–08 season. The highest ranked relegated team in the previous season, namely Ceahlăul Piatra Neamț (15th place in 2006–07 season), will continue in Liga I.
^{(2)} Timișoara change of name following name conflict with FC Politehnica Timișoara.

== Attendances ==
#	Club	Average
1	Timișoara	12,118
2	Steaua	11,764
3	CFR Cluj	9,000
4	Buzău	6,941
5	Vaslui	5,941
6	Pandurii	5,912
7	Craiova	5,541
8	Oțelul	5,441
9	Iași	5,306
10	Dinamo 1948	4,441
11	FC Rapid	4,265
12	U Cluj	3,788
13	Unirea	3,706
14	Ceahlăul	2,965
15	UTA	2,876
16	Mioveni	2,224
17	Farul	2,174
18	Bistriţa	1,871
