= André Leão =

Portuguese footballer

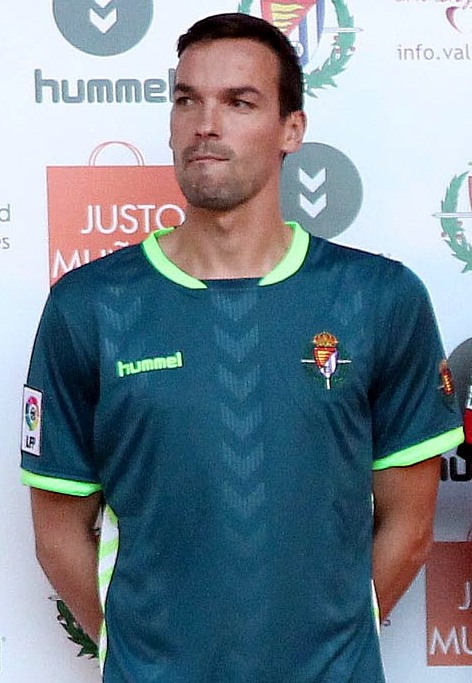
- Leão being presented by Valladolid

Personal information
- Full name: André Filipe Ribeiro Leão
- Date of birth: 20 May 1985 (age 41)
- Place of birth: Freamunde, Portugal
- Height: 1.84 m (6 ft 1/2 in)
- Position: Defensive midfielder

Youth career
- 1993–2003: Freamunde

Senior career*
| Years | Team | Apps | (Gls) |
| 2003–2005 | Freamunde | 30 | (1) |
| 2005–2006 | Porto B | 23 | (0) |
| 2006–2007 | Beira-Mar | 20 | (2) |
| 2007–2010 | CFR Cluj | 25 | (0) |
| 2010–2014 | Paços Ferreira | 108 | (3) |
| 2014–2017 | Valladolid | 103 | (0) |
| 2017–2019 | Paços Ferreira | 30 | (0) |
| 2020–2021 | Trofense | 10 | (0) |
| 2021–2022 | Varzim | 41 | (0) |
| 2022–2023 | Salgueiros | 20 | (0) |
| 2023–2024 | Leça | 25 | (0) |
| 2024–2025 | Freamunde | 15 | (0) |
| Total | | 450 | (6) |

International career
| 2005–2006 | Portugal U20 | 9 | (1) |
Medal record
CFR Cluj
| Winner | Romanian Cup | 2008 |
- * Club domestic league appearances and goals

André Filipe Ribeiro Leão (born 20 May 1985) is a Portuguese former professional footballer who played as a defensive midfielder.

== Club career ==
=== Early years ===
Leão was born in Freamunde. After a brief spell with FC Porto's reserves, he made his professional debut at Aveiro's S.C. Beira-Mar, his Primeira Liga debut coming on 17 September 2006 in a 2–0 home win against C.F. Estrela da Amadora where he came on as a 76th-minute substitute.

Leão was used regularly during that season, but only won one of the matches in which he appeared and his club was relegated.

=== CFR Cluj and Paços ===
Leão then moved to Romania with CFR Cluj, joining a host of compatriots and winning the Liga I championship in his debut campaign, appearing in 15 games. However, he would be rarely used during his two-and-a-half-year spell, and returned to his country in the late hours of the January 2010 transfer window, joining F.C. Paços de Ferreira.

In the 2010 off-season, Swansea City of the Football League Championship made an offer to sign Leão, but nothing came of it. He started in all his 29 league appearances in 2012–13 (two goals), as Paços finished a best-ever third and qualified for the UEFA Champions League for the first time ever.

=== Valladolid ===
On 12 June 2014, aged 29, Leão signed a three-year contract with Spanish club Real Valladolid. He made his competitive debut on 23 August, playing the 90 minutes in a 2–1 Segunda División home defeat of RCD Mallorca.

Leão was an undisputed starter in a three-year stint at the Estadio José Zorrilla, taking part in 107 matches in all competitions.

=== Paços return ===
On 13 July 2017, after alleging personal problems, Leão was transferred back to his previous club Paços Ferreira.

== Honours ==
CFR Cluj

- Liga I: 2007–08, 2009–10
- Cupa României: 2007–08, 2008–09
- Supercupa României: 2009

Paços Ferreira

- LigaPro: 2018–19
