= Dani (footballer, born 1982) =

Portuguese footballer

- Dani with CFR Cluj in 2008

Personal information
- Full name: Daniel Ricardo da Silva Soares
- Date of birth: 30 January 1982 (age 44)
- Place of birth: Felgueiras, Portugal
- Height: 1.77 m (5 ft 10 in)
- Position: Defensive midfielder

Youth career
- 1994–1998: Barrosas
- 1998–2001: Vizela

Senior career*
Years	Team	Apps	(Gls)
2001–2006	Vizela	114	(1)
2006	Paços Ferreira	14	(0)
2007–2010	CFR Cluj	94	(2)
2010–2011	Iraklis	24	(2)
2011–2013	Skoda Xanthi	45	(0)
2013–2016	Vitória Setúbal	83	(0)
2016–2018	Vizela	26	(0)
2018–2019	Lixa	30	(2)
2019–2021	Maia Lidador	31	(1)
Total		461	(8)

Managerial career
- 2024–2025: Cinfães (assistant)
- 2025–2026: Marco 09 (assistant)
- 2026: CFR Cluj (assistant)
- * Club domestic league appearances and goals

Daniel Ricardo da Silva Soares (born 30 January 1982), commonly known as Dani, is a Portuguese former professional footballer who played as a defensive midfielder.

== Club career ==
=== Portugal ===
Dani started playing football for Vizela, located near his birthcity of Felgueiras. He remained 14 years with the club his youth spell accounted for, spending his first four seasons as a senior in the third division, the latter ending in league victory and promotion to the Segunda Liga.

For the 2006–07 campaign, Dani moved to the Primeira Liga with Paços de Ferreira, making his debut in the competition on 27 August 2006 in a 2–1 away loss against Braga where he featured the full 90 minutes. He started in all his league appearances during his short tenure.

=== CFR Cluj ===
During the 2007 winter transfer window, Dani signed a four-and-a-half-year contract with CFR Cluj in Romania. He scored his first Liga I goal more than one year later, in a 1–1 draw at FC Unirea Urziceni.

Dani finished his first full season with 29 games as the team won the national championship, going on to be an important midfield unit in winning seven major titles, including three consecutive Cupa României.

=== Greece ===
On 31 August 2010, Dani agreed to a two-year deal at Iraklis of Super League Greece. He made his competitive debut for his new team on 11 September, in a 1–1 draw away to Atromitos. He scored his first league goal in the 19th round of the campaign, opening the score an eventual 2–0 home win over AEK Athens.

In late July 2011, Dani joined fellow top-flight side Skoda Xanthi.

=== Vitória Setúbal ===
Dani returned to Portugal in summer 2013 after six and a half years away, with the 31-year-old signing a two-year contract with Vitória de Setúbal and reuniting with his former Paços manager José Mota. During his stint, always spent in the top tier, he took part in 95 matches in all competitions, being sent off for two yellow cards in a 0–0 home draw against Arouca on 1 November 2015; the last was the result of a professional foul in injury time.

== Honours ==
Vizela

- Segunda Divisão: 2004–05

CFR Cluj

- Liga I: 2007–08, 2009–10
- Cupa României: 2007–08, 2008–09, 2009–10
- Supercupa României: 2009, 2010
