= Valeriu Bordeanu =

Romanian footballer (born 1977)

Personal information
- Full name: Valeriu Ionuţ Bordeanu
- Date of birth: 2 February 1977 (age 49)
- Place of birth: Botoșani, Romania
- Height: 1.81 m (5 ft 11 in)
- Position: Left-back

Youth career
- –1995: Mecanex Botoșani

Senior career*
Years	Team	Apps	(Gls)
1995–1996	Ceahlăul Piatra Neamț	9	(0)
1996	Bucovina Suceava	13	(0)
1997–1999	Politehnica Iași	45	(0)
1999–2002	Steaua București	40	(1)
2000–2001	→ FCM Bacău (loan)	8	(0)
2001–2002	→ FCM Bacău (loan)	13	(0)
2002–2003	FCM Bacău	12	(1)
2003–2004	Rapid București	21	(1)
2004	Kuban Krasnodar	2	(0)
2005	Universitatea Craiova	7	(0)
2005–2006	Politehnica Iași	45	(0)
2007–2010	Unirea Urziceni	96	(2)
2010–2011	Dinamo București	17	(0)
2011–2014	Botoșani	45	(0)
Total		373	(5)

Managerial career
- 2013–2014: Botoșani (assistant)
- 2013: Botoșani (caretaker)
- 2014–2015: Al-Arabi (assistant)
- 2015: ASA Târgu Mureș (assistant)
- 2015–2016: Jiangsu Suning (assistant)
- 2016: Kuban Krasnodar (assistant)
- 2016–2017: Al-Nasr (assistant)
- 2017–2018: CFR Cluj (assistant)
- 2018–2019: Guizhou Hengfeng (assistant)
- 2019–2020: CFR Cluj (assistant)
- 2020: CFR Cluj (caretaker)
- 2021: Kayserispor (assistant)
- 2021–2023: CFR Cluj (assistant)
- 2023–2024: Jeonbuk Hyundai Motors (assistant)
- * Club domestic league appearances and goals

Valeriu Ionuţ Bordeanu (born 2 February 1977) is a Romanian football coach and a former player who played as a left-back.

== Personal life ==
His father Ioan and brother Alin were also footballers, both of them being goalkeepers.

== Honours ==
Steaua București

- Divizia A: 2000–01
- Cupa României runner-up: 1999–2000

Rapid București

- Supercupa României: 2003

Unirea Urziceni

- Liga I: 2008–09
- Cupa României runner-up: 2007–08
- Supercupa României runner-up: 2009, 2010

Dinamo București

- Cupa României runner-up: 2010–11

FC Botoșani

- Liga II: 2012–13
