= Bruno Fernandes (footballer, born 1978) =

Guinea-Bissauan footballer

Personal information
- Full name: Bruno João Nandingna Borges Fernandes
- Date of birth: 6 November 1978 (age 47)
- Place of birth: São Sebastião, Portugal
- Height: 1.85 m (6 ft 1 in)
- Position: Centre back

Youth career
- 1989–1991: Vilafranquense
- 1991–1993: Quimigal
- 1993–1997: Belenenses

Senior career*
Years	Team	Apps	(Gls)
1997–1998	Atlético Malveira		
1998–1999	Amora	29	(2)
1999–2003	Belenenses	23	(0)
1999–2000	→ Alcochetense (loan)	30	(1)
2003–2004	Amora	23	(2)
2004	Aves	10	(1)
2005–2006	Beroe Stara Zagora	27	(1)
2006–2007	Aves	8	(0)
2007–2008	Ceahlăul	20	(0)
2008–2010	Unirea Urziceni	41	(0)
2010–2011	Târgu Mureş	20	(0)
2011–2013	Alki Larnaca	34	(0)
2013	Droylsden		
2013–2014	Workington	14	(0)
2014–2015	Cefn Druids	29	(0)
Total		308	(7)

International career
2007–2012	Guinea-Bissau	13	(0)
- * Club domestic league appearances and goals

Bruno João Nandingna Borges Fernandes (born 6 November 1978), known as Bruno Fernandes, is a Guinea-Bissauan retired professional footballer who played as a central defender.

== Honours ==
Unirea Urziceni

- Liga I: 2008–09
