= Vinicius Fabbron =

Brazilian footballer

Personal information
- Full name: Vinicius de Oliveira Fabrao
- Date of birth: March 26, 1989 (age 37)
- Place of birth: Londrina, Brazil
- Height: 1.84 m (6 ft 0 in)
- Position: Striker

Team information
- Current team: Pocheon
- Number: 19

Youth career
- 2000–2007: Londrina
- 2007–2008: AC Milan

Senior career*
Years	Team	Apps	(Gls)
2008–2012	Ceahlăul	37	(4)
2011–2012	→ Zimbru	9	(1)
2013–2014	Real Cartagena	11	(5)
2014–2017	PSTC	20	(12)
2018–	Pocheon	10	(5)
- * Club domestic league appearances and goals as of 2 April 2012

Vinicius de Oliveira Fabrao (born March 26, 1989, in Londrina), better known as Vinicius Fabbron, is a Brazilian footballer who currently plays for Korean club Pocheon.

== Career ==
Vinicius began his career with Associação Portuguesa Londrinense and joined on 12 September 2007 in the Primavera team of AC Milan who played a half year. He signed than in January 2008 for the Romanian club FC Ceahlăul Piatra Neamţ.
