= Cătălin Grigore =

Romanian footballer (born 1977)

Personal information
- Date of birth: 6 October 1977 (age 49)
- Place of birth: Voinești, Romania
- Height: 1.87 m (6 ft 2 in)
- Position: Goalkeeper

Team information
- Current team: Petrolul Ploiești (GK coach)

Youth career
- –1996: Chindia Târgovişte

Senior career*
Years	Team	Apps	(Gls)
1996–1999	Chindia Târgovişte	45	(0)
2000–2002	Petrolul Ploiești	22	(0)
2002–2003	Zimbru Chișinău	8	(0)
2003–2006	Politehnica Timișoara	34	(0)
2005–2006	→ CFR Timişoara (loan)	3	(0)
2006–2010	Unirea Urziceni	34	(0)
2007	→ FCM Târgovişte (loan)	16	(0)
2010–2012	Astra Ploiești	23	(0)
2012–2013	CS Ștefănești	20	(0)
Total		205	(0)

Managerial career
- 2013: Petrolul Ploiești U19 (GK coach)
- 2013–2016: Petrolul Ploiești (GK coach)
- 2016–2017: Dinamo București (GK coach)
- 2017–2018: Petrolul Ploiești (GK coach)
- 2018–2019: Dinamo București (GK coach)
- 2019: Al-Hazem (GK coach)
- 2020: Dinamo București (GK coach)
- 2020–: Petrolul Ploiești (GK coach)
- * Club domestic league appearances and goals

Cătălin Grigore (born 6 October 1977) is a Romanian former professional footballer who played as a goalkeeper, currently goalkeeping coach at Liga I club Petrolul Ploiești.

== Club career ==
He made his debut in the Divizia A at 19 for Chindia Târgovişte where he played until the 1999/2000 season.

His next destination was Petrolul Ploieşti where he did not make a great impact. After playing in 11 matches in his first season at the club, he lost his starting position.

In 2003, he moved to FCU Politehnica. His first year there brought him praise as a good goalkeeper, but as his performances during the next season were unconvincing, youngster Eduard Cristian Zimmermann replaced him. Since Marius Popa arrived at the club, Grigore has not been featured in any first division match. His subsequent move to Unirea is a consequence of this.

On 30 August 2010 he signed a two-year contract with Astra Ploieşti coming as a free agent following the financial problems involving the former Romanian champions.

== Honours ==
Zimbru Chișinău

- Cupa Moldovei: 2002–03

Unirea Urziceni

- Liga I: 2008–09
- Cupa României runner-up: 2007–08
