= Bogdan Mara =

Romanian footballer

Personal information
- Full name: Ion Bogdan Mara
- Date of birth: 29 September 1977 (age 49)
- Place of birth: Deva, Romania
- Height: 1.78 m (5 ft 10 in)
- Positions: Midfielder; right winger

Youth career
- –1995: Șoimii Sibiu

Senior career*
Years	Team	Apps	(Gls)
1995–1996	Șoimii Sibiu		
1996–1998	Inter Sibiu	39	(3)
1998–2000	Dinamo București	12	(3)
1998	→ Inter Sibiu (loan)	10	(5)
1999	→ Farul Constanța (loan)	12	(3)
2000	→ Argeș Pitești (loan)	24	(5)
2000–2001	Argeș Pitești	22	(7)
2001–2002	Alavés	35	(0)
2003–2004	Tianjin Teda	28	(2)
2004–2005	Poli Ejido	22	(1)
2005	Rapid București	5	(0)
2006	Stal Alchevsk	11	(2)
2006	UTA Arad	18	(6)
2007–2008	Unirea Urziceni	61	(13)
2009	CFR Cluj	31	(3)
2010–2011	Iraklis	39	(6)
2011	Skoda Xanthi	4	(0)
2012	UTA Arad	13	(5)
Total		386	(64)

International career
1999	Romania U21	1	(0)
2000–2009	Romania	11	(1)

Managerial career
- 2015–2016: ASA Târgu Mureș (president)
- 2017–2020: CFR Cluj (sporting director)
- 2020–2021: Astra Giurgiu (sporting director)
- 2021–2026: CFR Cluj (sporting director)
- * Club domestic league appearances and goals

Ion Bogdan Mara (born 29 September 1977) is a Romanian former professional footballer who played as a midfielder.

== Club career ==
=== Inter Sibiu ===
Born in Deva, Mara made his first steps in professional football in Sibiu, at Inter, where he played for two years. The excellent games made there caught the eyes of the big clubs of Romania.

=== Dinamo București ===
In 1998, he signed for Bucharest giants Dinamo București, one of the best Romanian clubs at the time. He played one season for the red-white squad, before going on loan to FC Farul Constanţa and Argeș Pitești.

=== Deportivo Alavés ===
Mara was the first transfer of Deportivo Alavés after the club's 4–5 loss against FC Liverpool in the UEFA Cup final. He stayed in Basque side for two seasons, but didn't scored once in 35 games. In his first year, Mara finished with Alavés on 7th position in La Liga.

=== Tianjin Teda ===
After two years in Alaves, Mara chose to leave Spain and signed for Chinese side Tianjin Teda. Sixth place in the championship was the best position Mara had with his team. After the Chinese adventure, Mara went to Polideportivo Ejido, Rapid București, Stal Alcevsk and UTA Arad, before joining Romanian squad Unirea Urziceni.

=== Unirea Urziceni ===
Mara was one of the key-players for Unirea Urziceni. In 2007–08 season, the midfielder scored 6 goals and his side finished the championship on 5th place. Next year, Mara's 5 goals in 17 games helped the little club from Urziceni win the Romanian championship.

=== CFR Cluj ===
In the winter-break of the 2008–09 season, Mara signed for CFR Cluj. He joined CFR as a free agent, after leaving Unirea Urziceni due to the club's financial issues. He was a key part of CFR's squad at the end of the season, when the club managed to secure the second Romanian Cup in its history. CFR also secured the Romanian Supercup.

=== Iraklis ===
On 15 January 2010, Iraklis signed the experienced Romanian midfielder, who was a free agent after being released by CFR Cluj In Greece, Mara played in 39 games and scored 6 goals, he also captained the team on several occasions.

=== Skoda Xanthi ===
On 31 August 2011, he signed a one-year contract with Greek side Skoda Xanthi.

== International career ==
Mara earned 11 caps for Romania, his debut being on 2 February 2000, in a friendly 2–0 home win against Latvia. He also played against Georgia, Cyprus, Algeria twice, Ukraine, Slovakia, Lithuania, Hungary, France and Faroe Islands. Mara scored his only goal in the national team against Cyprus, in 2000.

== Career statistics ==
=== International ===
Appearances and goals by national team and year
National team	Year	Apps	Goals
Romania	2000	5	1
Romania	2001	2	0
Romania	2009	4	0
Total		11	1

Scores and results list Romania's goal tally first, score column indicates score after each Mara goal.

#	Date	Venue	Opponent	Score	Result	Competition
1	6 February 2000	GSP Stadium, Nicosia, Cyprus	Cyprus	1–1	2–3	Friendly

== Honours ==
Unirea Urziceni

- Cupa României runner-up: 2007–08

CFR Cluj

- Cupa României: 2008–09
- Supercupa României: 2009
