= 2007–08 Cupa României =

Tournament details
- Country: Romania
- Teams: 32

Final positions
- Champions: CFR Cluj
- Runners-up: FC Unirea Urziceni

The 2007–08 Cupa României was the 70th season of the annual Romanian football knockout tournament. The final was held on 10 May 2008 at the Stadionul Ceahlăul in Piatra Neamţ.

== Round of 32 ==
The matches were played on 25, 26, and 27 September 2007.

Team 1	Score	Team 2
Prefab 05 Modelu	0–3	Politehnica Timişoara
Jiul Petroşani	3–2	Farul Constanţa
FC Drobeta-Turnu Severin	1–3	Ceahlăul Piatra Neamţ
FC Săcele	0–3	CFR Cluj
FC Brașov	1–0	Gloria Bistriţa
FCM Bacău II	0–4	Steaua București
Concordia Chiajna	0–6	Oţelul Galaţi
Mureşul Deva	2–3	Politehnica Iaşi
ACU Arad	0–2	Dacia Mioveni
Tricolorul Breaza	0–1	Gloria Buzău
FC Baia Mare	1–4	Unirea Urziceni
Sănătatea Servicii Publice Cluj	1–0	UTA Arad
Universitatea Cluj-Napoca	3–0	SC Vaslui
FCM Bacău	0–3	Rapid București
Progresul București	0–2	Dinamo București
Pandurii Lignitul Târgu Jiu	1–0	FC U Craiova

== Round of 16 ==
The matches were played on 5 and 6 December 2007.

Team 1	Score	Team 2
Jiul Petrosani	0–1	CFR Cluj
Dacia Mioveni	3–0	Ceahlăul Piatra Neamţ
Universitatea Cluj-Napoca	0–2	Pandurii Lignitul Târgu Jiu
Gloria Buzău	0–0 (a.e.t.) (7–5 p)	Politehnica Timişoara
Sănătatea Servicii Publice Cluj	0–4	Dinamo București
Politehnica Iaşi	0–3	Rapid București
FC Brașov	2–2 (a.e.t.) (7–6 p)	Oţelul Galaţi
Unirea Urziceni	2–0	Steaua București

== Quarter-finals ==
27 February 2008	Dacia Mioveni	1–0	Dinamo București	Urziceni
	Neagoe 55' (pen.)			Stadium: Stadionul Tineretului

27 February 2008	Unirea Urziceni	1–0	Rapid București	Constanţa
	Mara 70'			Stadium: Stadionul Farul

28 February 2008	Pandurii Târgu Jiu	0–0 (a.e.t.) (2–3 p)	Gloria Buzău	Mogoșoaia
				Stadium: Stadionul Mogoşoaia
	Penalties
	Stângă (penalty scored); Orac (penalty missed); Cardoso (penalty missed); Anilton (penalty scored); Jessui (penalty missed)		(penalty scored) Tudose; (penalty scored) Simion; (penalty missed) Liţu; (penalty scored) Eze

28 February 2008	CFR Cluj	1–0 (a.e.t.)	FC Brașov	Bucharest
	Ruiz 92'			Stadium: Stadionul Dinamo

== Semi-finals ==
16 March 2008	Dacia Mioveni	0–3	CFR Cluj	Bucharest
			Ruiz 1' 80'; Dani 78'	Stadium: Stadionul Giuleşti – Valentin Stănescu

17 March 2008	Gloria Buzău	0–1	Unirea Urziceni	Bucharest
			Pădureţu 88'	Stadium: Stadionul Cotroceni

== Final ==
10 May 2008
20:45 EEST

CFR Cluj	2–1	Unirea Urziceni
Ruiz 49'; Semedo 64'	Report	Dănălache 58'

Stadionul Ceahlăul, Piatra Neamţ
Attendance: 10,000
Referee: Aurelian Bogaciu (Romania)

Cupa României 2007–08 winners
CFR Cluj
1st title
