= 2008–09 Cupa României =

Tournament details
- Country: Romania
- Teams: 32

Final positions
- Champions: CFR Cluj
- Runners-up: Politehnica Timișoara

The 2008–09 Cupa României was the 71st season of the Romanian football knockout tournament. It began on 30 July 2008 and the final was played on 13 June 2009. CFR Cluj were the defending champions and succeeded in keeping the cup for one more year at Cluj-Napoca.

== Round of 32 ==
In this round entered the 14 winners of the Phase V and the 18 teams from the 2008–09 Liga I season.

The matches were played on 14–16 October and 4 November 2008.

Team 1	Score	Team 2
Târgu Mureș	1–2	Dinamo București
Râmnicu Vâlcea	0–1	Otopeni
Minerul Lupeni	0–4	Unirea Urziceni
Universitatea Cluj-Napoca	3–3 (a.e.t.) (10–11 p)	CFR Cluj
Sportul Studențesc București	2–0	Steaua București
Petrolul Ploiești	2–3 (a.e.t.)	Rapid București
CFR II Cluj	0–1	Politehnica Timișoara
Internațional Curtea de Argeș	2–1	Argeș Pitești
Tricolorul Breaza	1–2	Oțelul Galați
Dunărea Galați	0–0 (a.e.t.) (4–2 p)	Gaz Metan Mediaș
FC Ploiești	1–3	FC U Craiova
CFR Timișoara	1–4	Gloria Bistrița
Botoșani	0–0 (a.e.t.) (4–3 p)	Gloria Buzău
FCM Bacău	0–1	Pandurii Târgu Jiu
Farul Constanța	0–1	Brașov
Vaslui	3–0	Politehnica Iași

== Round of 16 ==
The matches were played on 11–13 November 2008.

Team 1	Score	Team 2
Rapid București	3–0	Internațional Curtea de Argeș
Sportul Studențesc București	0–1	CFR Cluj
Dunărea Galați	1–2	Politehnica Timișoara
Botoșani	1–3	Dinamo București
Unirea Urziceni	1–0	Oțelul Galați
Gloria Bistrița	1–1 (a.e.t.) (5–3 p)	Brașov
FC U Craiova	1–4	Pandurii Târgu Jiu
Otopeni	1–2	Vaslui

== Quarter-finals ==
The matches were played on 14 and 15 April 2009.

14 April 2009	CFR Cluj	1–0	Pandurii Târgu Jiu	Bucharest
15:00 EEST	Peralta 44' (pen.)			Stadium: Dinamo Stadium

14 April 2009	Unirea Urziceni	0–2	Vaslui	Buzău
20:45 EEST			Wesley 32'; Genchev 79'	Stadium: Municipal Stadium

15 April 2009	Politehnica Timișoara	2–0	Gloria Bistrița	Cluj-Napoca
15:00 EEST	Magera 90'; Curtean 90+1'			Stadium: Dr. Constantin Rădulescu Stadium

15 April 2009	Dinamo București	4–2	Rapid București	Pitești
20:45 EEST	Perjă 19' (o.g.); Boștină 37'; Niculae 67', 79'		Lazăr 10'; Andrade 90'	Stadium: Nicolae Dobrin Stadium

== Semi-finals ==
The matches were played on 28 and 29 April 2009.

28 April 2009	Dinamo București	1–4	Politehnica Timișoara	Cluj-Napoca
20:45 EEST	Ad. Cristea 71'		Magera 25'; Agunbiade 60'; Bucur 81'; Nibombé 86'	Stadium: Dr. Constantin Rădulescu Stadium

29 April 2009	CFR Cluj	2–0	Vaslui	Urziceni
20:45 EEST	Ruiz 10'; Pereira 90+2'			Stadium: Tineretului Stadium

== Final ==
13 June 2009
21:00 EEST

Politehnica Timişoara	0–3	CFR Cluj
	Report	Deac 7'; Peralta 29' (pen.); Culio 54'

Stadionul Tudor Vladimirescu, Târgu Jiu
Attendance: 9,000
Referee: Cristian Balaj (Romania)

Cupa României 2008–09 winners
CFR Cluj
2nd title
