= Cristian Dănălache =

Romanian footballer

Personal information
- Full name: Cristian Costin Dănălache
- Date of birth: 15 July 1982 (age 44)
- Place of birth: Bucharest, Romania
- Height: 1.90 m (6 ft 3 in)
- Position: Striker

Team information
- Current team: Alexandria (manager)

Senior career*
Years	Team	Apps	(Gls)
2003–2006	Otopeni	31	(10)
2006–2007	UTA Arad	26	(2)
2007–2008	→ Unirea Urziceni (loan)	27	(9)
2008–2010	Unirea Urziceni	29	(4)
2010	Al-Ettifaq	8	(4)
2010–2011	Bnei Sakhnin	10	(2)
2011–2013	Jiangsu Sainty	73	(37)
2014	Qingdao Jonoon	27	(10)
2015	Xinjiang Tianshan	27	(24)
2016	Gyeongnam	38	(19)
2017	Daejeon Citizen	25	(9)
2018–2019	Sportul Snagov	21	(5)
2019–2020	CS Progresul		(0)
Total		342	(135)

Managerial career
- 2021: Academia Prosport U16
- 2022: Alexandria
- * Club domestic league appearances and goals

Cristian Costin Dănălache (born 15 July 1982) is a Romanian professional football coach and former football player.

== Career ==
Dănălache began his career with Liga III club CS Otopeni in the 2003–04 season. He helped the club win promotion to the Second Division at the end of the season. In 2006, he transferred to UTA Arad, where he got his first taste of Liga I football, before signing for Unirea Urziceni. After two and a half years with the club, Dănălache won the 2008–09 Liga I championship.

In 2010, he agreed to short-term deals in Israel and Saudi Arabia.

=== Jiangsu Sainty ===
Before the 2011 season, the scouters of Jiangsu Sainty observed Dănălache a couple of times at the Turkish training camp. On 21 March 2011, Jiangsu Sainty formally announced the signing of the Romanian striker.

During his first months at Jiangsu Sainty, Dănălache didn not adapt well to life in his new surroundings. His game form finally began to rise under manager Dragan Okuka, who signed with Jiangsu in May. Dănălache got his first goal for the club on 29 May 2011, against Guizhou Renhe when he scored the winning goal to take a 1–0 victory.

=== League One ===
On 28 February 2014, Dănălache transferred to China League One side Qingdao Jonoon . In February 2015, Dănălache transferred to fellow China League One side Xinjiang Tianshan Leopard.

On 20 January 2016, Dănălache joined K League 2 side Gyeongnam FC.

== Career statistics ==
As of match played 18 October 2019

Appearances and goals by club, season and competition
Club	Season	League			National cup (Note: Includes Cupa României, Crown Prince Cup, Israel State Cup, Chinese FA Cup, Korean FA Cup.)		Continental		Total	
Club	Season	Division	Apps	Goals	Apps	Goals	Apps	Goals	Apps	Goals
CS Otopeni	2003–04	Liga III			2	1	–		2	1
CS Otopeni	2004–05	Liga II	9	1	0	0	–		9	1
CS Otopeni	2005–06	Liga II	22	9	1	1	–		23	10
CS Otopeni	Total		31	10	3	2	0	0	34	12
UTA Arad	2006–07	Liga I	26	2	2	2	–		28	4
Unirea Urziceni	2007–08	Liga I	27	9	4	2	–		31	11
Unirea Urziceni	2008–09	Liga I	20	3	3	1	2	0	25	4
Unirea Urziceni	2009–10	Liga I	9	1	2	3	0	0	11	4
Unirea Urziceni	Total		56	13	9	6	2	0	67	19
Sportul Snagov	2018–19	Liga II	21	5	1	0	–		22	5
Al-Ettifaq	2009–10	Saudi Professional League	8	4	0	0	–		8	4
Bnei Sakhnin	2010–11	Israeli Premier League	10	2	0	0	–		10	2
Jiangsu Sainty	2011	Chinese Super League	30	13	1	0	–		31	13
Jiangsu Sainty	2012	Chinese Super League	28	23	1	0	–		29	23
Jiangsu Sainty	2013	Chinese Super League	15	1	2	0	0	0	17	1
Jiangsu Sainty	Total		73	37	4	0	0	0	77	37
Qingdao Jonoon	2014	China League One	27	10	3	1	–		30	11
Xinjiang Tianshan Leopard	2015	China League One	27	24	3	2	–		30	26
Gyeongnam	2016	K League 2	38	19	0	0	–		38	19
Daejeon Citizen	2017	K League 2	25	9	1	0	–		26	9
Career total			342	135	26	13	2	0	370	148

== Honours ==
Unirea Urziceni

- Romanian League: 2008–09
- Romanian Cup runner-up: 2007–08

Jiangsu Sainty

- Chinese Super League runner-up: 2012

Individual

- Chinese Football Association Footballer of the Year: 2012
- Chinese Super League Golden Boot winner: 2012
- Chinese Super League Team of the Year: 2012
