= Ceahlăul Municipal Stadium =

Football stadium in Piatra Neamț, Romania

Ceahlăul Stadium
- Borzoghean
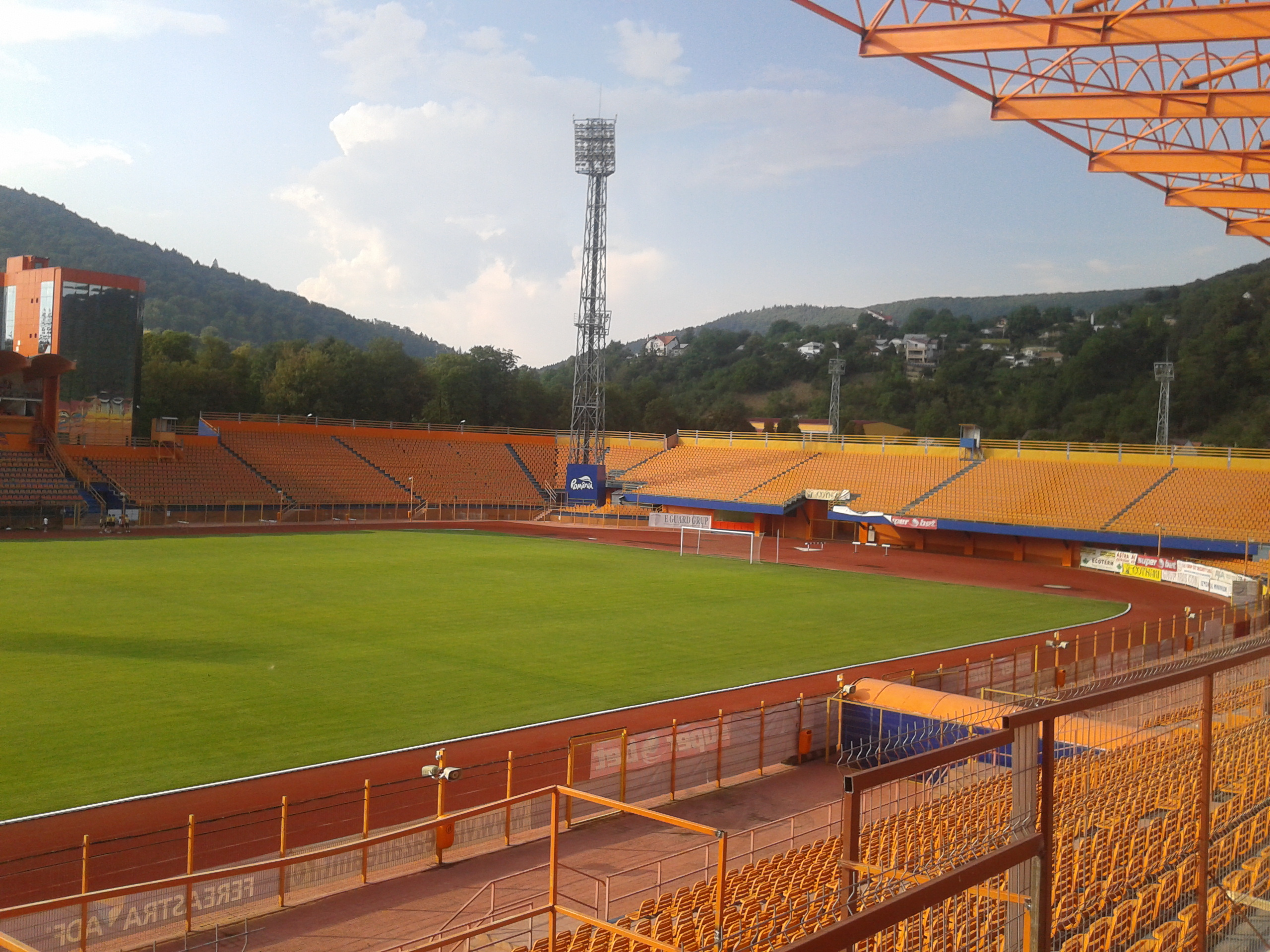
- UEFA
- Interactive map of Ceahlăul Stadium
- Address: Str. Eroilor, nr. 18
- Location: Piatra Neamț, Romania
- Coordinates: 46°56′18.69″N 26°21′20.67″E
- Owner: Municipality of Piatra Neamț
- Operator: Ceahlăul Piatra Neamț
- Capacity: 16,621
- Surface: Grass

Construction
- Opened: 1935
- Renovated: 2006–2007, 2011–2012
- Expanded: 2006–2007, 2011–2012

Tenant
- Ceahlăul Piatra Neamţ (1935–present)

Ceahlăul Stadium is a multi-purpose stadium in Piatra Neamț, Romania. It is currently used mostly for football matches and is the home ground of Ceahlăul Piatra Neamţ. The stadium, as well as the local football club, takes its name from the Ceahlău Massif, located in the region. The stadium holds 18,000 people and, after major rehabilitation works, received a Category 3 ranking. The 2008 Cupa României Final and the 2011 Supercupa României were held in this stadium. It is the 11th stadium in the country by capacity.

== Events ==
=== Association football ===
International football matches
Date	Competition	Home	Away	Score	Attendance
28 March 2007	UEFA Euro 2008 qualifying	Romania	Luxembourg	3 - 0	9,120
14 October 2009	2010 FIFA World Cup qualification	Romania	Faroe Islands	3 - 1	13,000
3 September 2010	UEFA Euro 2012 qualifying	Romania	Albania	1 - 1	13,400
29 March 2011	UEFA Euro 2012 qualifying	Romania	Luxembourg	3 - 1	13,500

== Gallery ==
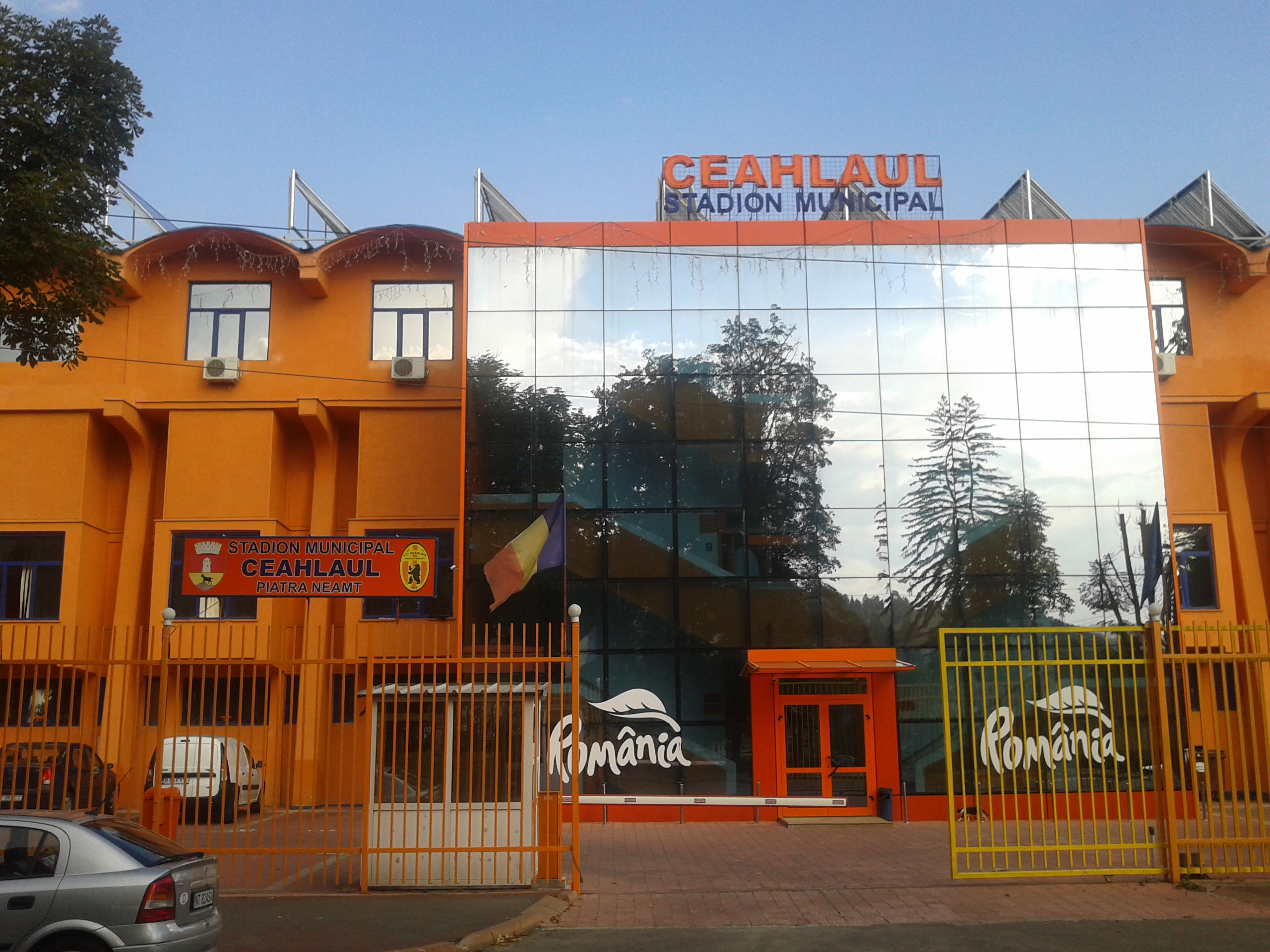
VIP Sector exterior view

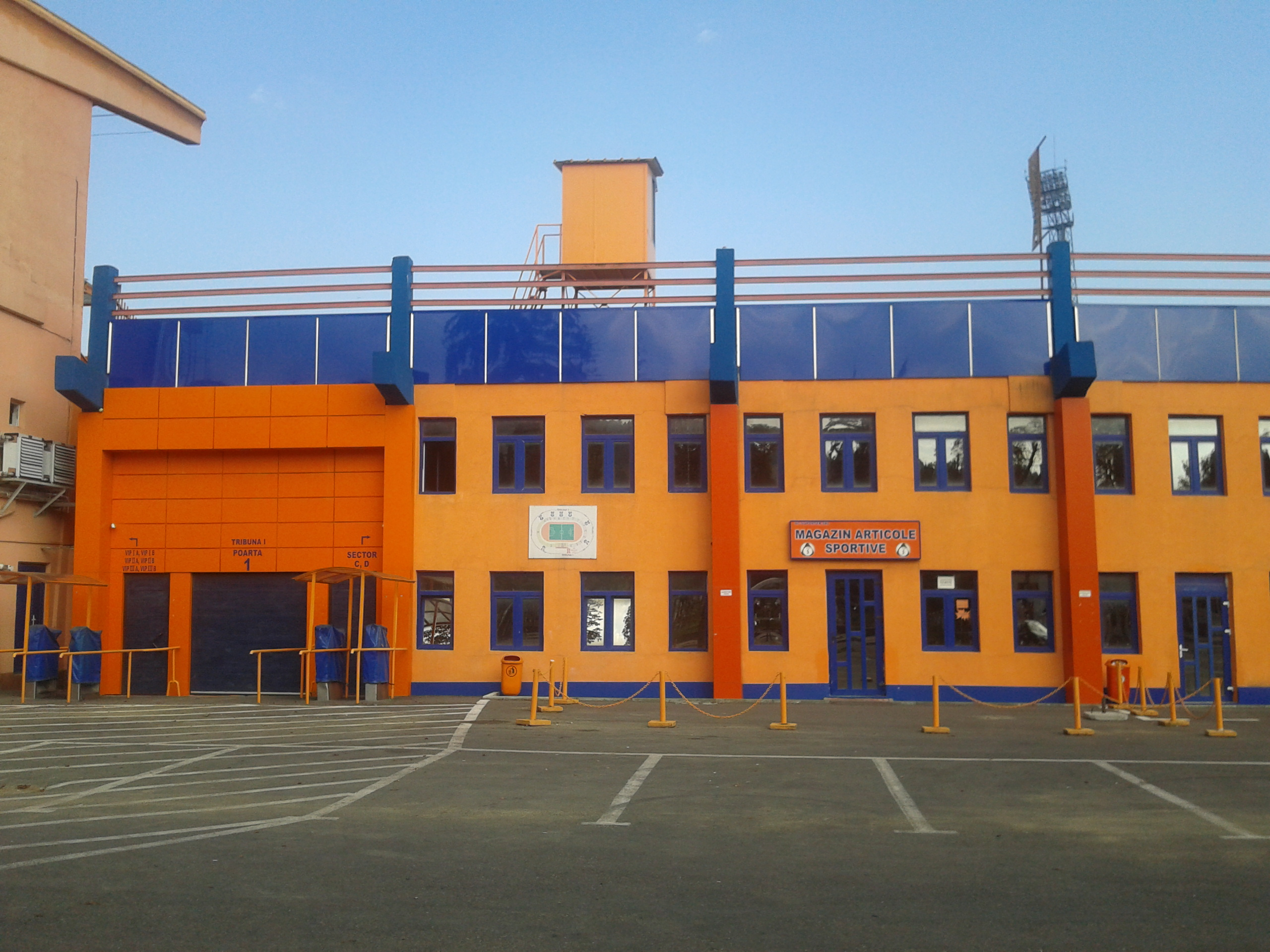
Main Sector exterior view

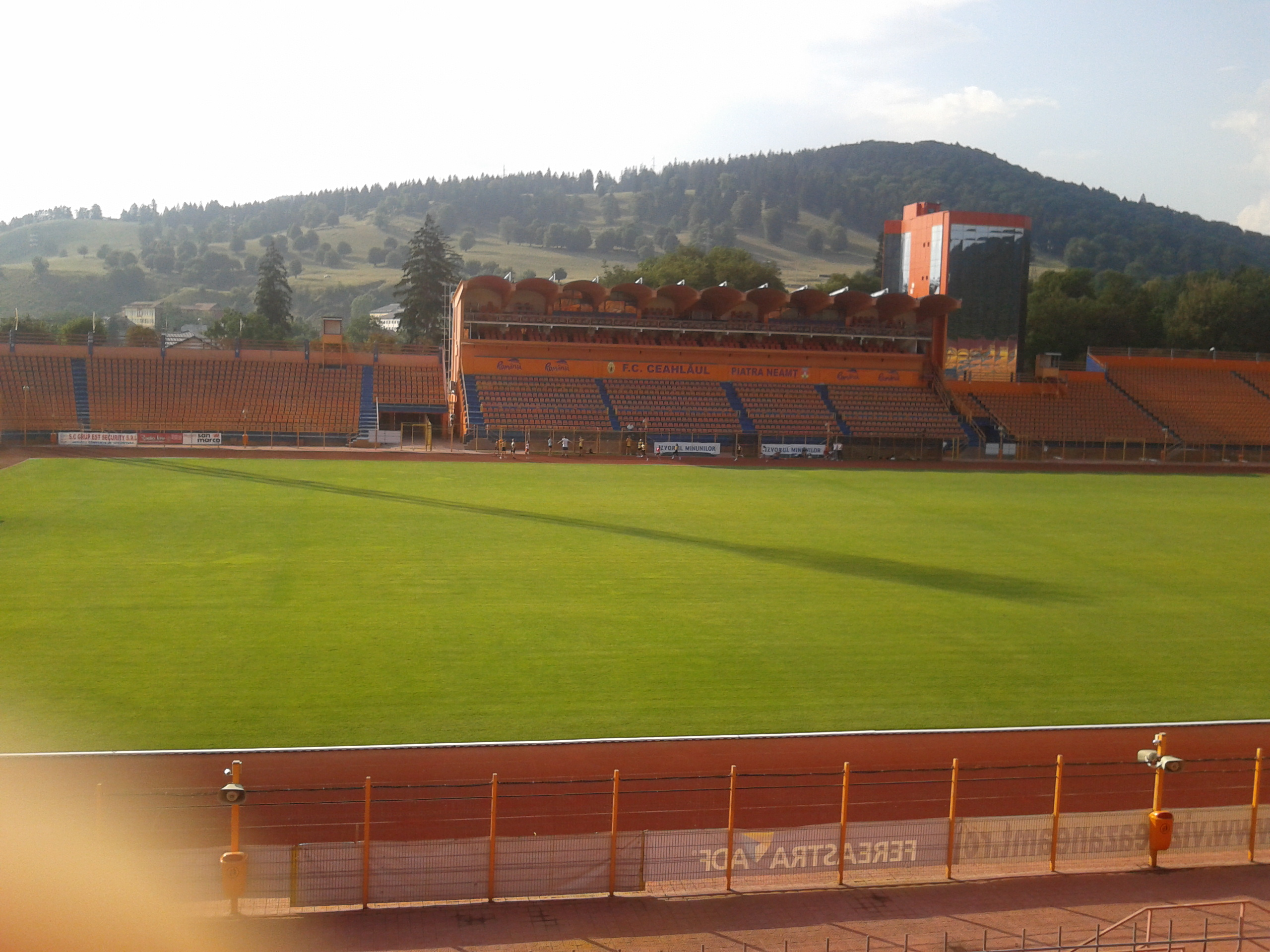
Interior view of the Main Sector

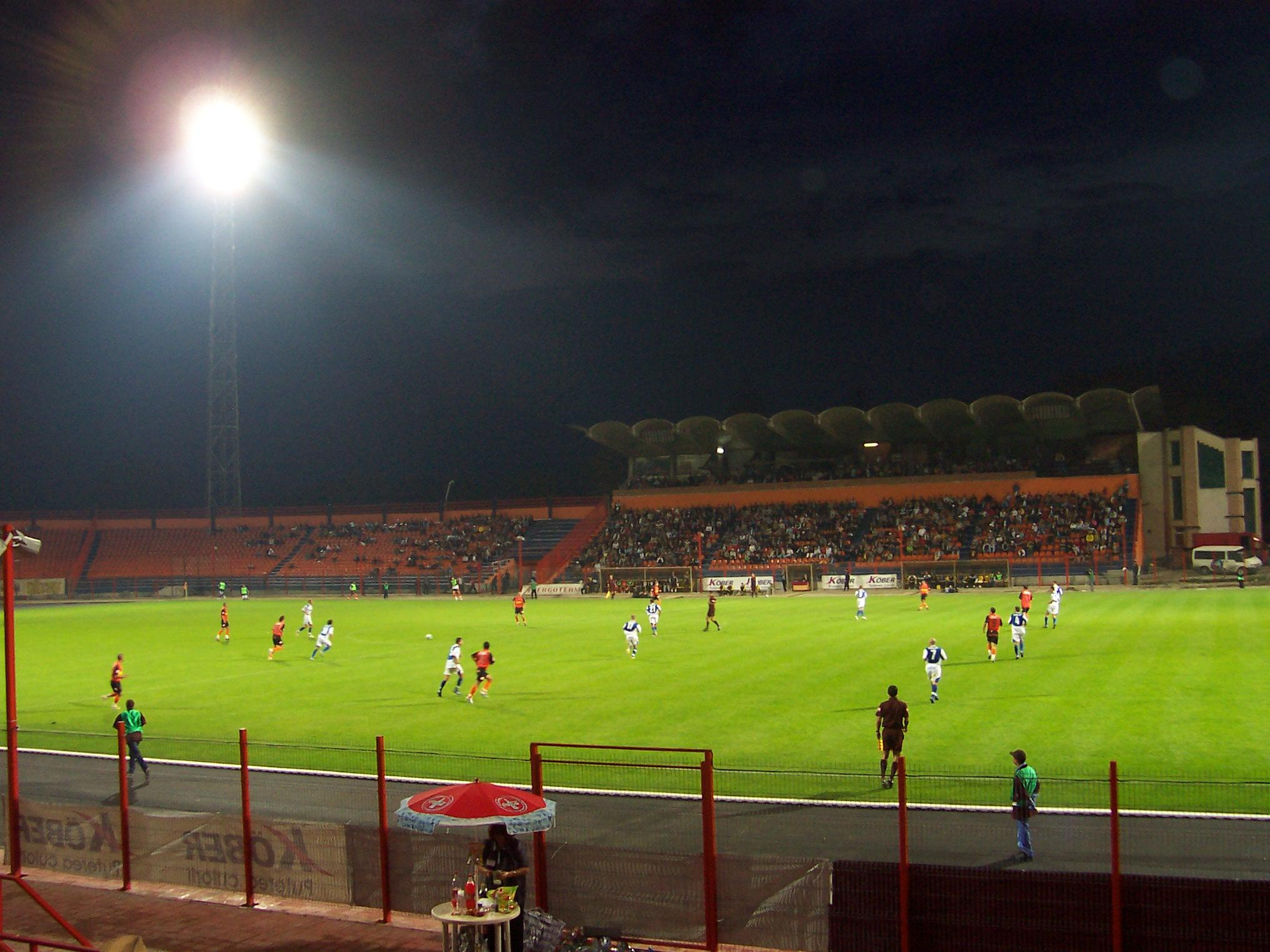
Interior view of the stadium-floodlights on

Preceded by Stadionul Dan Păltinișanu; Timișoara	Cupa României; Final Venue; 2008	Succeeded by Stadionul Tudor Vladimirescu; Târgu Jiu
Preceded by Stadionul Dr. Constantin Rădulescu; Cluj-Napoca	Supercupa României; Final Venue; 2011	Succeeded by Arena Națională; Bucharest
