= Tineretului Stadium (Urziceni) =

Football stadium

Coordinates: 44°42′45.45″N 26°39′21.66″E

Tineretului
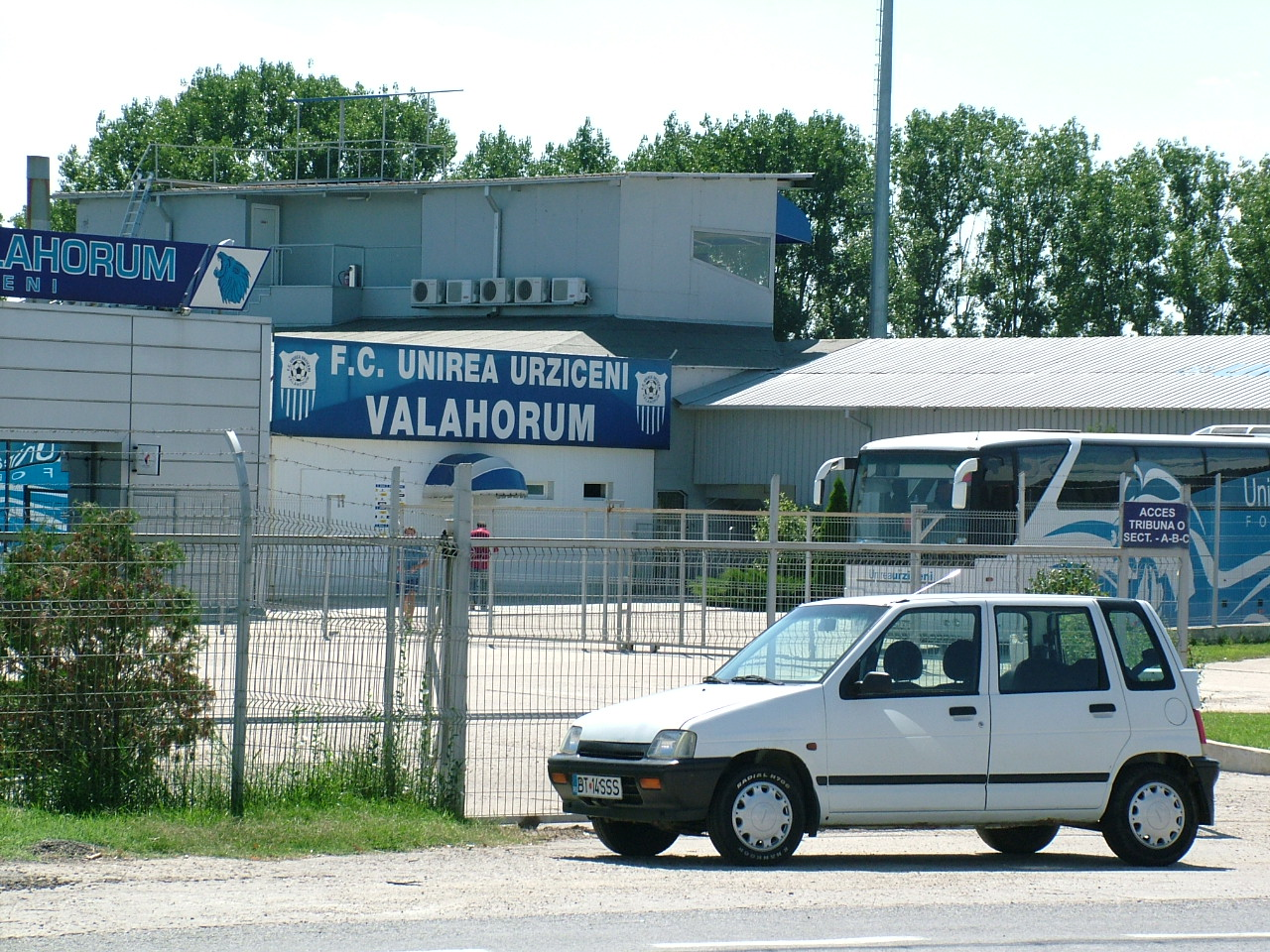
- Stadionul Tineretului entrance.
- Interactive map of Tineretului
- Location: Urziceni, Romania
- Owner: Municipality of Urziceni
- Operator: FC Urziceni
- Capacity: 7,000
- Surface: Grass

Construction
- Groundbreaking: 1973
- Opened: 1976
- Renovated: 2005, 2017
- Expanded: 2008

Tenants
- Unirea Urziceni (1976–2011); FC Urziceni (2017–present)

The Tineretului Stadium is a multi-purpose stadium in Urziceni, Romania. It is currently used mostly for football matches and is the home ground of FC Urziceni.

The stadium is not very big, having a floodlighting system, with a density of 1400 lux, that has been inaugurated in 2007 but it does not meets UEFA's conditions to host UEFA Champions League matches. For this reason, Unirea had to play their home matches in the 2009–2010 edition on the Steaua Stadium.

In English "tineretului" means "of/to the youth", while "Unirea" is translated as "The Union".

In the autumn of 2014 there were some hooligans that vandalized the stadium.

In the 26th of August 2017 a match between FC Urziceni and Abatorul Slobozia was played for the first time ever since the Tineretului been renovated from the vandalization from the autumn of 2014. The match ended up that Urziceni lost 0–2.

Although the match was played, the renovation is not really done yet but there can be played some matches on Tineretului. FC Urziceni used to train at the stadium the season before they played that match in August 2017.

== Romania national football team ==
The following national team matches were held in the stadium.

#	Date	Score	Opponent	Competition
1.	25 March 2005	2–0	Netherlands	2006 UEFA European Under-21 Championship qualification
2.	20 August 2008	1–0	Latvia	Friendly match

== See also ==
- List of football stadiums in Romania
