= Răzvan Pădurețu =

Romanian footballer (born 1981)

Personal information
- Date of birth: 19 June 1981 (age 45)
- Place of birth: Bucharest, Romania
- Height: 1.76 m (5 ft 9 in)
- Position: Attacking midfielder

Senior career*
Years	Team	Apps	(Gls)
1999–2006	Dinamo București	11	(0)
2000	→ FC Baia Mare (loan)	9	(2)
2000–2002	→ FCM Câmpina (loan)	27	(3)
2002–2004	→ CSM Focșani (loan)	60	(5)
2005–2006	→ Gloria Bistrița (loan)	24	(3)
2006–2007	Gloria Bistrița	16	(2)
2007–2011	Unirea Urziceni	97	(6)
2011–2013	FCM Târgu Mureș	31	(0)
2013–2015	Berceni	34	(6)
2015	Spartak Varna		
2015–2016	Berceni	30	(11)
2016	Academica Clinceni	5	(1)
2016–2017	Metalul Reșița	13	(2)
Total		357	(41)

International career^{‡}
2010	Romania	1	(0)
- * Club domestic league appearances and goals as of 2 February 2017 ‡ National team caps and goals as of 2011

Răzvan Pădurețu (born 19 June 1981 in Bucharest), is a retired Romanian football player.

== International career ==
Pădurețu made one appearance for Romania under coach Răzvan Lucescu, when he came as a substitute and replaced Paul Codrea in the 72nd minute of a friendly which ended with a 2–0 loss against Israel in 2010.

== Conviction ==
On 28 September 2014 Pădurețu was involved in a hit and run road accident while driving his car in Berceni and hit a 44-year-old man who died and then he ran away from the scene. In May 2017 he was sentenced to a jail term of three years and two months.

== Titles ==
Season	Club	Title
2001–02	Dinamo București	Liga I
2006–07	Dinamo București	Liga I
2008–09	Unirea Urziceni	Liga I
