= Urziceni =

- Municipality
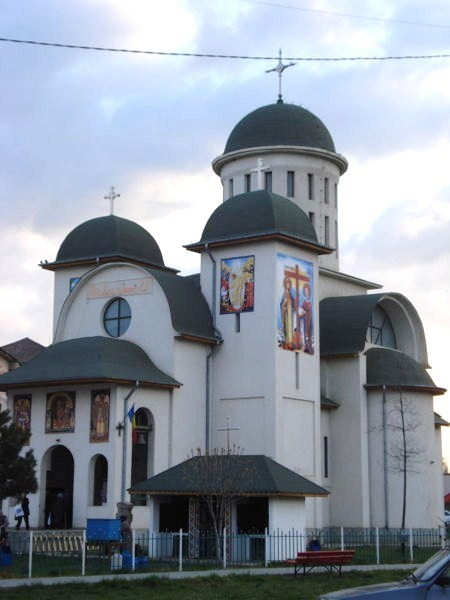
- The Orthodox church in the city center

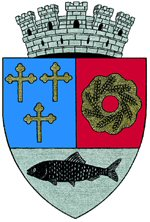
- Coat of arms

- Location in Ialomița County

- Location in Romania
- Coordinates: 44°43′5″N 26°38′43″E
- Country: Romania
- County: Ialomița

Government
  - Mayor (2024–2028): Constantin Sava (PSD)
- Area: 53.57 km^{2} (20.68 sq mi)
- Elevation: 60 m (200 ft)
- Population (2021-12-01): 13,380
  - Density: 249.8/km^{2} (646.9/sq mi)
- Time zone: UTC+02:00 (EET)
  - Summer (DST): UTC+03:00 (EEST)
- Postal code: 925300
- Area code: (+40) 02 43
- Vehicle reg.: IL
- Website: primaria-urziceni.ro

Urziceni (Romanian pronunciation: [urziˈt͡ʃenʲ]) is a city in Ialomița County, Muntenia, Romania, located around 60 km (37 mi) north-east of Bucharest.

== Geography ==
The city is situated at the western edge of the Bărăgan Plain, on the banks of the Ialomița River and its tributary, the river Cotorca. It is located in the northwestern part of Ialomița County, 62 km (39 mi) from the county seat, Slobozia.

Urziceni is an important transportation hub in Romania. It is crossed by national road DN2 (part of European route E85), which runs from Bucharest towards Buzău and on towards Suceava and the border with Ukraine at Siret. Road DN1D connects Urziceni to Ploiești, 63 km to the northwest, while road DN2A runs eastward towards Slobozia and continues all the way to Constanța, on the Black Sea coast.

The Urziceni train station serves the CFR Main Line 700, which connects Bucharest to Brăila, Galați and the border with Moldova at Giurgiulești, as well as Line 701, which connects it to Ploiești.

== History ==
Founded by Romanian shepherds, the name of the city is derived from the word "urzică" (nettle). It was mentioned for the first time in a written document on 23 April 1596, during the reign of Michael the Brave. It gained in 1831 the status of market town and in 1895 the city status. For 117 years (between 1716 and 1833), it was the capital of Ialomița County.

== Demographics ==
Historical population
Year	Pop.	±%
1912	3,437	—
1930	8,616	+150.7%
1948	4,425	−48.6%
1956	6,061	+37.0%
1966	9,291	+53.3%
1977	12,476	+34.3%
1992	19,483	+56.2%
2002	19,088	−2.0%
2011	14,053	−26.4%
2021	13,380	−4.8%
Source: Census data

As the census of 2011 results showed, Urziceni was ranked in 3rd place in Ialomița County, after Slobozia and Fetești. It had a population of 14,053, of which 93.1% were ethnic Romanians, 4.6% Roma, and 1.6% Hungarians. Moreover, there were 6,765 males and 7,288 females. At the 2021 census, the city had 13,380 inhabitants; of those, 82.35% were Romanians and 4.4% Roma.

== Natives ==
- Marian Damaschin (born 1965), footballer
- Roxana Dumitrescu (born 1967), foil fencer
- Răzvan Farmache (born 1978), footballer
- Robert Neacșu (born 2000), footballer
- Constantin Niculescu (born 1944), boxer
- Marius Stan, scientist and actor
- Emil Străinu (born 1957), general, writer, and politician
- Leontin Toader (born 1964), footballer
- Alexandru Toma (1875–1954), poet, journalist, and translator

== Football record ==
A little town by any standards, Urziceni is perhaps best known for its football team, Unirea Urziceni. Urziceni holds the record for the smallest town to have a team in the UEFA Champions League. The team wound up a year later.

== Other ==
In Urziceni, there is at 44°43′7″N 26°36′41″E an underground storage for natural gas operated by Romgaz and at 44°42′35″N 26°36′39″E a medium wave transmitter with a 102 m (335 ft) tall radio mast working on 531 kHz.
