= FC Unirea Urziceni =

Football club in Ialomița County, Romania

Unirea Urziceni
- Full name: Fotbal Club Unirea Urziceni
- Nicknames: Chelsea de Ialomița (Chelsea of Ialomița); Chelsea de Urziceni (Chelsea of Urziceni); Lupii din Bărăgan (Wolves of Bărăgan)
- Short name: Unirea
- Founded: 1954 as Aurora Urziceni
- Dissolved: 2011
- Ground: Tineretului
- Capacity: 7,000
- Owner: Urziceni Municipality
- Manager: Răzvan Farmache
Home colours	Away colours

Fotbal Club Unirea Urziceni, commonly known as Unirea Urziceni (Romanian pronunciation: [urziˈt͡ʃenʲ]), was a Romanian professional football club based in Urziceni, Ialomița County. Unirea became national champions in 2009, at the end of their third season in the top-flight.

The club was founded in 1954, and spent the majority of its history in the lower tiers of the Romanian league system. In 2006 they reached Liga I for the first time, and received national praise for their results at this level. At the end of their second season in the top division they earned qualification to Europe, and one year later they claimed the domestic title. In 2010, the team's owner withdrew financial support and Urziceni was forced to sell most of its players to pay debts, leading to relegation at the end of the 2010–11 season.

In the summer of 2011, owner Dumitru Bucșaru did not file for a licence for the club to play in the Liga I and decided not to enroll the team in any championship. Unirea Urziceni was subsequently dissolved.

Currently, there is the football team AS FC Urziceni, established and supported by the local mayorship in 2016, which plays on the Tineretului stadium in the Ialomița county leagues.

== History ==
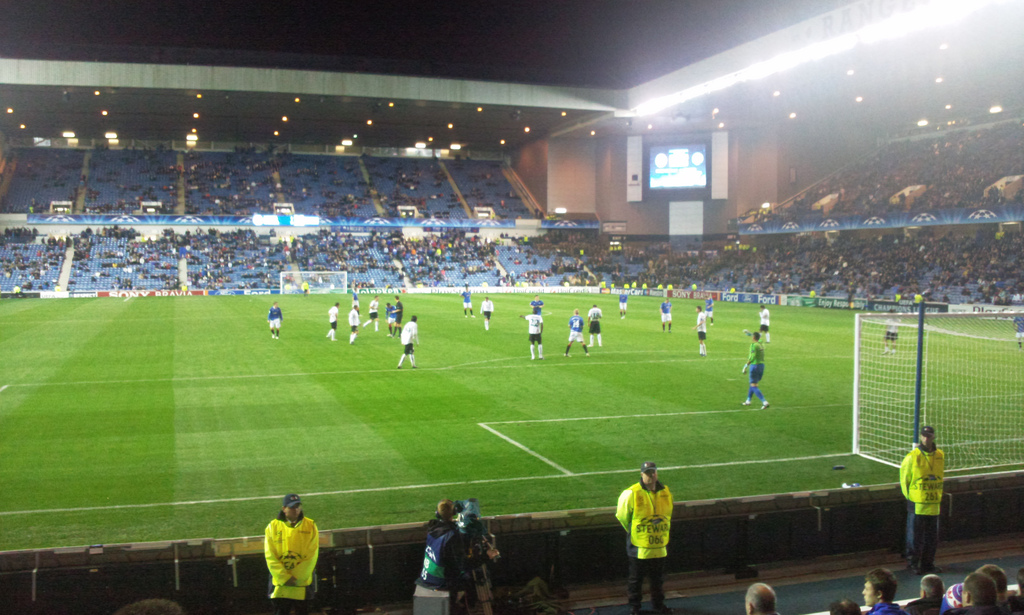
Rangers versus Unirea (1–4) in 2009

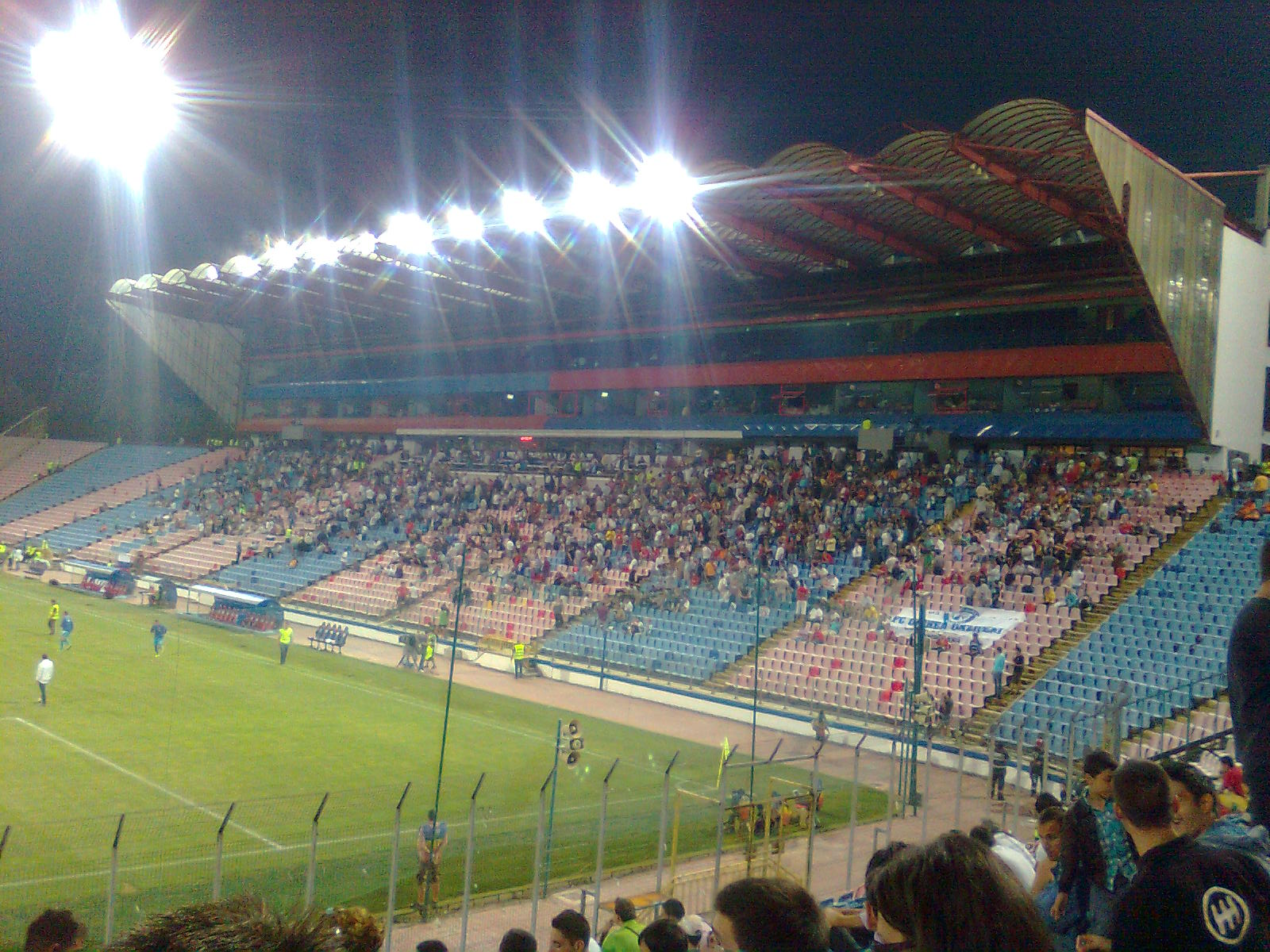
Unirea versus Zenit (0–0) in 2010

The first sporting club in Urziceni was a basketball club called "Ialomița". On an improvised pitch at Obor, the football team "Ialomița" played against teams from Ploiești, Buzău, and Slobozia. They also played many games against Germans settled around the local lake, from which they took the name "La Nemți" ("At the Germans'").

In 1976, a new stadium, Tineretului, was inaugurated.

In 1988, the club reached the round-of-sixteen phase of the Cupa României, but lost 3–1 to Corvinul Hunedoara.

Prior to their promotion to Liga II at the end of the 2002–03 season, the club had spent its entire history playing in the lower leagues of the Romanian football league system, mostly in Divizia C and Divizia D.

In 2003, the club was taken over by a new sponsor, Valahorum. At the end of the 2005–06 season, the club finished second in the Seria 2 of the Liga II. Following the play-offs, played against Forex Brașov and Bihor Oradea, at Stadionul Național, the club was promoted to the Liga I for the first time in its history.

=== Ascension ===
The club finished 10th in its first season in the top division. In the Liga I 2007–08, they finished seventh and reached the cup final. Manager and former Chelsea player Dan Petrescu nicknamed the team Chelsea of Ialomița. The following season the club won the league for the first time, after they beat Timișoara 2–1, and qualified for the Champions League.

The club finished 3rd in the 2009–10 UEFA Champions League Group stage, obtaining 8 points. They beat Rangers 4–1 in Glasgow and Sevilla in Bucharest 1–0 and drew 1–1, with VfB Stuttgart and Rangers at Bucharest. In the 2009–10 UEFA Europa League Knockout stage, Urziceni were drawn against English giants Liverpool. In the first round, at Anfield, Liverpool won 1–0, and at Bucharest, Unirea lost again, 1–3.

Unirea finished second in the 2009–10 Liga I season, again qualifying for the UEFA Champions League. In the third qualifying round, Unirea finished 0–0 against Zenit St. Petersburg at Bucharest. In Russia, they lost 1–0, with Danny scoring the winner. In the Europa League Play-off round Unirea played against Hajduk Split. They lost in the first game played at Stadion Poljud in Split 4–1, and drew 1–1 in Bucharest.

=== Decline, dissolution and refounding ===
In 2010, Unirea Urziceni started to decline. Dumitru Bucșaru sold almost the entire team during the first half of the championship, on account of a debt owed to Steaua owner Gigi Becali. In the second half of the season, Unirea took players on loan from Steaua II București and Dinamo II București, but only finished the season in 17th place. Although Unirea had avoided relegation, it didn't renew its license and was dissolved in 2011.

== Chronology of names ==
Name	Period
Aurora Urziceni	1954–1974
Avântul Urziceni	1975–1979
Ferom Urziceni	1979–1984
Unirea Urziceni	1984–1999
Agricultorul Urziceni	1999–2001
Unirea Urziceni	2001–2011

== Nickname ==
Both of the club's nicknames originated during Dan Petrescu's period with the club.

Urziceni have been associated with Chelsea by the Romanian media after they quickly evolved from a newly promoted team to a title contender under the management of former Chelsea defender Dan Petrescu. His role was seen similar to that of Roman Abramovich, who started to invest massively in Chelsea in 2003, turning them in one of the best teams in Europe. They are therefore also called the Chelsea of Urziceni or the Chelsea of Ialomița.

Dan Petrescu is also responsible for coining the Wolves of Bărăgan nickname. During training sessions and official fixtures, he would call his players "wolves" in order to increase their ferocity. Bărăgan refers to the plain in which the town of Urziceni is located.

Both of these nicknames were rarely used by the Romanian media, which usually referred to the team as Ialomițenii, after the Ialomița County from where the club was based.

== Colors and crest ==
Valahorum era logo

Alternative club logo used during 2009–10 UEFA Champions League

Unirea Urziceni colors are blue and white. However, the football equipment worn by the "ialomițeni" had over time other than the traditional colors such as orange, green, black or blue. Unirea Urziceni provider of equipment was the Spanish company Joma.

The club crest contained a lion's head, a symbol of power. After the arrival of coach Dan Petrescu, a former player and admirer of Chelsea, the logo has undergone significant changes. Valahorum SA sponsor's name was removed from the emblem, being replaced by the number 1954 which is the year of foundation of the club. Logo design has also been modified so that it resemble as much English team emblem . Hence the nickname Team : Chelsea of Ialomița or Chelsea of Urziceni.

== Stadium ==
The club played its home matches at the Stadionul Tineretului, which has a capacity of 7,000 seats. They played their European matches at the Steaua Stadium in Bucharest because Stadionul Tineretului didn't meet UEFA criteria.

== Honours ==
=== Domestic ===
- Liga I
  - Winners (1): 2008–09
  - Runners-up (1): 2009–10
- Liga II
  - Runners-up (1): 2005–06
- Liga III
  - Winners (1): 2002–03
  - Runners-up (1): 1987–88
- Cupa României
  - Runners-up (1): 2007–08
- Supercupa României
  - Runners-up (2): 2009, 2010

== European record ==
=== Total statistics ===
Competition	S	P	W	D	L	GF	GA	GD
UEFA Champions League / European Cup	2	8	2	3	3	8	9	–1
UEFA Europa League / UEFA Cup	3	6	0	2	4	3	11	–8
Total	5	14	2	5	7	11	20	–9

=== Statistics by country ===
Country	P	W	D	L	GF	GA	GD
Croatia	2	0	1	1	2	5	–3
England	2	0	0	2	1	4	–3
Germany	4	0	2	2	2	6	–4
Russia	2	0	1	1	0	1	–1
Scotland	2	1	1	0	5	2	+3
Spain	2	1	0	1	1	2	–1
Total	14	2	5	7	11	20	–9

=== Statistics by competition ===
Season	Competition	Round	Opponents	Home	Away	Aggregate
2008–09	UEFA Cup	1R	(Germany) Hamburg	0–2	0–0	0–2
2009–10	UEFA Champions League	Group G	(Spain) Sevilla	1–0	0–2	3rd place
2009–10	UEFA Champions League	Group G	(Germany) Stuttgart	1–1	1–3	3rd place
2009–10	UEFA Champions League	Group G	(Scotland) Rangers	1–1	4–1	3rd place
2009–10	UEFA Europa League	R32	(England) Liverpool	1–3	0–1	1–4
2010–11	UEFA Champions League	3QR	(Russia) Zenit St. Petersburg	0–0	0–1	0–1
2010–11	UEFA Europa League	PO	(Croatia) Hajduk Split	1–1	1–4	2–5

== League history ==
Season	Tier	Division	Place	Cupa României
2010–11	1	Liga I	17th (R)	Round of 16
2009–10	1	Liga I	2nd	Round of 16
2008–09	1	Liga I	1st (C)	Quarter-finals
2007–08	1	Liga I	5th	Final
2006–07	1	Liga I	10th	Round of 16
2005–06	2	Liga II (Seria II)	2nd (P)	
2004–05	2	Liga II (Seria II)	5th	Round of 32
2003–04	2	Liga II (Seria II)	6th	

Season	Tier	Division	Place	Cupa României
2002–03	3	Divizia C (Seria II)	1st (C, P)	
2001–02	3	Divizia C (Seria III)	13th	
2000–01	3	Divizia C (Seria II)	12th	
1999–00	3	Divizia C (Seria II)	13th	
1998–99	4	Divizia D (IL)	1st (C, P)	
1991–92	3	Divizia C (Seria IV)	13th (R)	
1990–91	3	Divizia C (Seria IV)	10th	
1989–90	4	Divizia D (IL)	1st (C, P)	

== Former managers ==
- (Romania) Dan Petrescu (2006–2009)
- (Romania) Eugen Nae (2010) interim
