= 2010–11 FC Steaua București season =

Steaua București
2010–11 season
- Owner: George Becali
- President: Valeriu Argăseală
- Head coach: Victor Pițurcă; Ilie Dumitrescu; Eduard Iordănescu (caretak.); Marius Lăcătuș; Sorin Cârțu; Gabriel Caramarin (caretak.)
- Stadium: Stadionul Steaua
- Liga I: 5th
- Cupa României: Winners
- Europa League: Group stage
- Top goalscorer: League: Bogdan Stancu (13); All: Bogdan Stancu (16)
- Highest home attendance: 25,000 (approx.) vs Universitatea Craiova (31 July 2010)
- Lowest home attendance: 0 (close doors) vs Gaz Metan Mediaș (14 November 2010); 1,972 vs Gloria Bistrița (1 May 2011)
Home colours	Away colours

The 2010–11 season was the 63rd season in the existence of FC Steaua București and the club's 63rd consecutive season in the top flight of Romanian football. In addition to the domestic league, Steaua București participated in this season's edition of the Cupa României and the UEFA Europa League.

== Previous season positions ==
	Competition	Position
(European Union)	UEFA Europa League	4th / Group stage
(Romania)	Liga I	4th
(Romania)	Cupa României	Round of 16

== Players ==
=== Squad information ===
N	Pos.	Nat.	Name	Age	EU	Since	App	Goals	Ends	Transfer fee	Notes
1	GK	(Romania)	Stanca	31	EU	2011	1	0	Undisclosed	Undisclosed	
3	LB	(Nigeria)	Emeghara	27	Non-EU	2007	23	0	2011	€1.2M	Also plays as RB
4	CB	(Bulgaria)	Iliev	30	EU	2011	0	0	2012	Free	
5	DM	(Argentina)	Brandán	28	Non-EU	2010	0	0	Undisclosed	Undisclosed	Also plays as LB
6	CB	(Romania)	Gardoș	21	EU	2010	0	0	Undisclosed	Undisclosed	Also plays as DM
7	RW	(Romania)	Székely	28	EU	2008	37	6	2013	€1.5M	Also plays as LW
8	AM	(Romania)	Răduț	21	EU	2010	0	0	Undisclosed	Undisclosed	
9	FW	(Romania)	Burdujan	27	EU	2011	0	0	Undisclosed	Free	
10	AM	(Romania)	Cr. Tănase	24	EU	2009	21	1	2014	€1.8M	Also plays as LW, RW and CM; 50% of next sale will go to Argeș Pitești
11	RW	(Romania)	Onofraș	30	EU	2010	0	0	Undisclosed	Undisclosed	Also plays as FW
12	GK	(Romania)	Tătărușanu	25	EU	2008	15	0	2013	€1.5M	
14	LB	(Romania)	Latovlevici	25	EU	2010	0	0	2015	Undisclosed	
16	RW	(Romania)	Nicoliță	26	EU	2005	156	19	Undisclosed	Undisclosed	Also plays as LW and RB
17	FW	(Romania)	Bilașco	29	EU	2010	0	0	Undisclosed	Undisclosed	
18	CB	(Serbia)	Novak	26	Non-EU	2010	0	0	2013	Undisclosed	
20	FW	(Romania)	Dică	31	EU	2011	124	54	2011	Free	Also plays as SS
22	CB	(Romania)	Galamaz	30	EU	2010	0	0	Undisclosed	Undisclosed	
23	CB	(Portugal)	Geraldo	30	EU	2010	0	0	2012	Free	
24	FW	(Romania)	Surdu	27	EU	2007	44	5	2011	Undisclosed	Also plays as LW
25	CB	(Romania)	Baciu	31	EU	2004	87	1	2011	€0.23M	FCM Bacău should receive €0.4M if Baciu is transferred or becomes free player
26	CM	(Romania)	Bicfalvi	23	EU	2007	22	1	2012	Undisclosed	
27	AM	(Romania)	Marinescu	26	EU	2010	0	0	2015	Undisclosed	
33	GK	(Romania)	Cezar	23	EU	2010	0	0	Undisclosed	Youth system	
91	AM	(Romania)	Matei	19	EU	2010	0	0	Undisclosed	Undisclosed	Also plays as LW
99	FW	(Brazil)	Maicon	23	Non-EU	2011	0	0	2011	Undisclosed	
Players buy, sold and rebuy during the season
1	GK	(Romania)	Stanca	31	EU	2010	0	0	Undisclosed	Undisclosed	
Players sold or loaned out during the season
—	DM	(Romania)	Onicaș	21	EU	2009	9	0	Undisclosed	Undisclosed	
—	LM	(Romania)	Voiculeț	25	EU	2010	0	0	Undisclosed	Undisclosed	
—	RB	(Romania)	Matei	21	EU	2011	0	0	2016	€0.7M	
1	GK	(Colombia)	Rufay	32	Non-EU	2007	85	0	2011	€0.5M	
2	RB	(Bulgaria)	Todorov	29	EU	2010	0	0	Undisclosed	Undisclosed	
4	CB	(Romania)	Abrudan	27	EU	2010	0	0	Undisclosed	Undisclosed	
5	DM	(Romania)	D. Stoica	32	EU	2010	0	0	Undisclosed	Undisclosed	Also plays as CB
9	FW	(Greece)	Kapetanos	27	EU	2008	53	26	Undisclosed	Free	
11	AM	(Romania)	Păcurar	29	EU	2010	0	0	Undisclosed	Undisclosed	
19	AM	(Romania)	An. Ionescu	23	EU	2008	16	0	2013	€0.5M	50% of next sale will go to U Craiova
20	DM	(Bulgaria)	Angelov	33	EU	2010	0	0	Undisclosed	Undisclosed	Also plays as LB
21	DM	(Brazil)	Ricardo	29	Non-EU	2010	0	0	Undisclosed	Undisclosed	
28	FW	(Romania)	B. Stancu	23	EU	2008	54	19	2012	€1M	Also plays as SS; 50% of next sale will go to Giovani Becali
29	RB	(Brazil)	Bonfim	30	Non-EU	2010	0	0	Undisclosed	Undisclosed	
32	CM	(Romania)	Apostol	30	EU	2010	0	0	Undisclosed	Undisclosed	

- Last updated: 18:20, 20 November 2010 (UTC)
- Source: Steaua News

=== Transfers ===
==== In ====
No.	Pos.	Nat.	Name	Age	EU	Moving from	Type	Transfer window	Ends	Transfer fee	Source
—	GK	(Romania)	Vâtcă	30	EU	Gaz Metan Mediaș	Loan return	Summer	Undisclosed	—	
—	RB	(Romania)	Bălan	30	EU	SKA-Energiya Khabarovsk (Russia)	Loan return	Summer	Undisclosed		
—	CB	(Romania)	Ninu	23	EU	Farul Constanța	Loan return	Summer	Undisclosed	—	
—	DM	(Romania)	Onicaș	20	EU	Politehnica Iași	Loan return	Summer	Undisclosed	—	
19	AM	(Romania)	An. Ionescu	22	EU	Politehnica Iași	Loan return	Summer	2013	—	
2	RB	(Bulgaria)	Todorov	28	EU	Lokomotiv Plovdiv	Transfer	Summer	Undisclosed	Undisclosed	FCSB
5	DM	(Romania)	D. Stoica	31	EU	Ettifaq (Saudi Arabia)	Free transfer	Summer	Undisclosed	Free	
11	AM	(Romania)	Păcurar	28	EU	Pandurii Târgu Jiu	Transfer	Summer	Undisclosed	Undisclosed	FCSB
1	GK	(Romania)	Stanca	30	EU	Pandurii Târgu Jiu	Loan	Summer	2011	Undisclosed	FCSB
8	AM	(Romania)	Răduț	20	EU	Internațional Curtea de Argeș	Transfer	Summer	Undisclosed	Undisclosed	FCSB
6	CB	(Romania)	Gardoș	21	EU	Concordia Chiajna	Transfer	Summer	Undisclosed	Undisclosed	FCSB
4	CB	(Romania)	Abrudan	26	EU	Brașov	Transfer	Summer	Undisclosed	Undisclosed	FCSB
18	CB	(Serbia)	Novak	25	Non-EU	Pandurii Târgu Jiu	Transfer	Summer	Undisclosed	Undisclosed	
23	CB	(Portugal)	Geraldo	29	EU	AEK Athens (Greece)	Free transfer	Summer	2012	Free	FCSB
14	LB	(Romania)	Latovlevici	24	EU	Politehnica Timișoara	Transfer	Summer	2015	Undisclosed	FCSB
20	DM	(Bulgaria)	Angelov	32	EU	Energie Cottbus (Germany)	Free transfer	Summer	Undisclosed	Free	FCSB
91	AM	(Romania)	Matei	18	EU	Farul Constanța	Transfer	Summer	Undisclosed	Undisclosed	
33	GK	(Romania)	Cezar	22	EU	Steaua II București	Promoted	Summer	Undisclosed	Youth system	
—	LM	(Romania)	Voiculeț	24	EU	Internațional Curtea de Argeș	Transfer	Summer	Undisclosed	Undisclosed	
29	RB	(Brazil)	Bonfim	29	Non-EU	Politehnica Timișoara	Transfer	Summer	Undisclosed	Undisclosed	
22	CB	(Romania)	Galamaz	29	EU	Unirea Urziceni	Transfer	Summer	Undisclosed	Undisclosed	
21	DM	(Brazil)	Ricardo	29	Non-EU	Unirea Urziceni	Transfer	Summer	Undisclosed	Undisclosed	
27	AM	(Romania)	Marinescu	26	EU	Unirea Urziceni	Transfer	Summer	2015	Undisclosed	
32	CM	(Romania)	Apostol	29	EU	Unirea Urziceni	Transfer	Summer	Undisclosed	Undisclosed	
17	FW	(Romania)	Bilașco	29	EU	Unirea Urziceni	Transfer	Summer	Undisclosed	Undisclosed	
11	RW	(Romania)	Onofraș	30	EU	Unirea Urziceni	Transfer	Summer	Undisclosed	Undisclosed	
5	DM	(Argentina)	Brandán	27	Non-EU	Unirea Urziceni	Transfer	Summer	Undisclosed	Undisclosed	
1	GK	(Colombia)	Rufay	31	Non-EU	Steaua II București	Promoted	Summer	2011	Youth system	
25	CB	(Romania)	Baciu	30	EU	Steaua II București	Promoted	Summer	2011	Youth system	
—	RB	(Romania)	Matei	20	EU	Pandurii Târgu Jiu	Transfer	Winter	2016	€0.7M	FCSB
—	DM	(Romania)	Onicaș	20	EU	Târgu Mureș	Loan return	Winter	Undisclosed	—	
20	FW	(Romania)	Dică	30	EU	Catania (Italy)	Free transfer	Winter	Undisclosed	Free	
1	GK	(Romania)	Stanca	31	EU	Pandurii Târgu Jiu	Transfer	Winter	Undisclosed	Undisclosed	
9	FW	(Romania)	Burdujan	26	EU	Vaslui	Free transfer	Winter	Undisclosed	Free	
4	CB	(Bulgaria)	Iliev	30	EU	Universitatea Craiova	Free transfer	Winter	2012	Free	FCSB
99	FW	(Brazil)	Maicon	22	Non-EU	Volyn Lutsk (Ukraine)	Loan	Winter	2011	Undisclosed	FCSB

==== Out ====
No.	Pos.	Nat.	Name	Age	EU	Moving to	Type	Transfer window	Transfer fee	Source
2	CB	(Cyprus)	Parpas	24	EU	AEL Limassol	End of loan	Summer	—	
20	CB	(Senegal)	Tall	25	Non-EU	APOP Kinyras Peyias (Cyprus)	End of loan	Summer	—	
22	FW	(Colombia)	Pepe	28	Non-EU	Independiente (Argentina)	End of loan	Summer	—	
—	RB	(Romania)	Bălan	30	EU	SKA-Energiya Khabarovsk (Russia)	Transfer	Summer	Undisclosed	
5	CB	(Bulgaria)	Zhelev	30	EU	Inter Baku (Azerbaijan)	Contract termination	Summer	—	
18	LB	(Romania)	P. Marin	36	EU	Unirea Urziceni	End of contract	Summer	Free	FCSB
1	GK	(Colombia)	Rufay	31	Non-EU	Steaua II București	Second team	Summer	—	FCSB
17	CB	(Romania)	Baciu	30	EU	Steaua II București	Second team	Summer	—	FCSB
—	GK	(Romania)	Vâtcă	28	EU	Gaz Metan Mediaș	Mutual termination	Summer	—	FCSB
—	CB	(Romania)	Ninu	23	EU	Viitorul Constanța	Transfer	Summer	Undisclosed	FCSB
—	DM	(Romania)	Onicaș	20	EU	Târgu Mureș	Loan	Summer	Undisclosed	FCSB
8	DM	(Romania)	Ov. Petre	28	EU	Al-Nassr (Saudi Arabia)	Transfer	Summer	Undisclosed	
4	RB	(Poland)	Golański	27	EU	Korona Kielce	End of contract	Summer	Free	
11	FW	(Armenia)	A. Karamyan	30	Non-EU	Unirea Urziceni	End of contract	Summer	Free	
77	LW	(Armenia)	Karamyan	30	Non-EU	Unirea Urziceni	End of contract	Summer	Free	
15	CB	(Romania)	Tudose	23	EU	Gloria Bistrița	Transfer	Summer	Undisclosed	
19	CM	(Romania)	Pleșan	27	EU	Volga Nizhny Novgorod (Russia)	Transfer	Summer	Undisclosed	
8	AM	(Colombia)	Toja	25	EU	Aris (Greece)	Transfer	Summer	Undisclosed	
—	LM	(Romania)	Voiculeț	24	EU	Pandurii Târgu Jiu	Transfer	Summer	Undisclosed	
2	RB	(Bulgaria)	Todorov	29	EU	Minyor Pernik	Release	Summer	Free	
11	AM	(Romania)	Păcurar	28	EU	Universitatea Cluj	Transfer	Summer	Undisclosed	
1	GK	(Romania)	Stanca	30	EU	Pandurii Târgu Jiu	Loan termination	Summer	—	
5	DM	(Romania)	D. Stoica	31	EU	Universitatea Craiova	Transfer	Summer	Undisclosed	
32	CM	(Romania)	Apostol	29	EU	Unirea Urziceni	Mutual termination	Summer	Free	
20	DM	(Bulgaria)	Angelov	32	EU	Anorthosis Famagusta (Cyprus)	Mutual termination	Winter	Free	FCSB
—	RB	(Romania)	Matei	20	EU	Pandurii Târgu Jiu	Loan	Winter	Undisclosed	FCSB
4	CB	(Romania)	Abrudan	26	EU	Universitatea Cluj	Transfer	Winter	Undisclosed	U Cluj
1	GK	(Colombia)	Rufay	32	Non-EU	Galatasaray (Turkey)	Mutual termination	Winter	Free	
9	FW	(Greece)	Kapetanos	27	EU	CFR Cluj	Mutual termination	Winter	Free	
28	FW	(Romania)	B. Stancu	23	EU	Galatasaray (Turkey)	Transfer	Winter	€6M	
—	DM	(Romania)	Onicaș	21	EU	Unirea Urziceni	Loan	Winter	Undisclosed	
19	AM	(Romania)	An. Ionescu	22	EU	Steaua II București	Second team	Winter	—	
21	DM	(Brazil)	Ricardo	29	Non-EU	Khazar (Azerbaijan)	Mutual termination	Summer	Free	FCSB
29	RB	(Brazil)	Bonfim	30	Non-EU	Khazar (Azerbaijan)	Mutual termination	Summer	Free	FCSB

2010–11 captain
Player	Rounds
Bănel Nicoliță	1–4
Cristian Tănase	5–20
Ciprian Tătărușanu	21–34

== Statistics ==
=== Player stats ===
				Total				UEFA Europa League		Liga I		Cupa României		
N	Pos.	Name	Nat.	GS	App	Gls	Min	App	Gls	App	Gls	App	Gls	Notes
1	GK	Stanca	(Romania)	1	1		—					1		
3	LB	Emeghara	(Nigeria)	16	16		—	3		11		2		GS: 16 RB
4	CB	Iliev	(Bulgaria)	4	5		—			4		1		
5	DM	Brandán	(Argentina)	27	31		—			26		5		GS: 13 LB, 12 DM, 1 LW, 1 CM
6	CB	Gardoș	(Romania)	30	33	1	—	5	1	23		5		GS: 24 CB, 6 DM
7	RW	Székely	(Romania)	6	19		—	4		11		4		GS: 4 RW, 2 LW
8	AM	Răduț	(Romania)	17	28		—	6		20		2		GS: 9 AM, 4 RW, 3 CM, 1 LW
9	FW	Burdujan	(Romania)	1	5	1	—			5	1			GS: 1 RW
10	AM	Cr. Tănase	(Romania)	36	38	3	—	7	2	27	1	4		GS: 33 LW, 2 AM, 1 RW
11	RW	Onofraș	(Romania)	7	15	2	—			13	2	2		GS: 3 SS, 2 FW, 2 RW
12	GK	Tătărușanu	(Romania)	46	47	-42	—	8	-12	34	-27	5	-3	
14	LB	Latovlevici	(Romania)	35	39	1	—	8		27		4	1	
16	RW	Nicoliță	(Romania)	36	38	5	—	6		27	4	5	1	GS: 33 RW, 2 LW, 1 RB
17	FW	Bilașco	(Romania)	23	31	5	—			25	5	6		
18	CB	Novak	(Serbia)	13	14	1	—	2		9	1	3		GS: 7 CB, 6 RB
20	FW	Dică	(Romania)	11	13	6	—			11	4	2	2	GS: 4 SS, 4 FW, 3 AM
22	CB	Galamaz	(Romania)	15	15		—			11		4		
23	CB	Geraldo	(Portugal)	37	37	2	—	8		27	2	2		
24	FW	Surdu	(Romania)	22	34	5	—	8		21	4	5	1	GS: 11 FW, 6 LW, 3 SS, 2 RW
25	CB	Baciu	(Romania)				—							
26	CM	Bicfalvi	(Romania)	19	28		—	6		19		3		
27	AM	Marinescu	(Romania)	11	20		—			16		4		GS: 7 CM, 3 LW, 1 RW
33	GK	Cezar	(Romania)				—							
91	AM	Matei	(Romania)		9		—	2		5		2		
99	FW	Maicon	(Brazil)	4	8	3	—			6	3	2		
Players sold or loaned out during the season
—	DM	Onicaș	(Romania)				—							
—	LW	Voiculeț	(Romania)				—							
—	RB	Matei	(Romania)				—							
1	GK	Stanca	(Romania)	1	1		—			1				
1	GK	Rufay	(Colombia)				—							
2	RB	Todorov	(Bulgaria)				—							
4	CB	Abrudan	(Romania)	9	10		—	3		7				
5	DM	D. Stoica	(Romania)	7	7	1	—	2		5	1			
9	FW	Kapetanos	(Greece)	8	17	2	—	3	1	12	1	2		
11	AM	Păcurar	(Romania)	3	6	1	—			6	1			
19	AM	An. Ionescu	(Romania)				—							
20	DM	Angelov	(Bulgaria)	7	13		—	8		3		2		GS: 6 DM, 1 CM
21	DM	Ricardo	(Brazil)	18	23		—	5		16		2		GS: 17 DM, 1 CM
28	FW	B. Stancu	(Romania)	26	27	16	—	8	3	18	13	1		GS: 22 SS, 4 FW
29	RB	Bonfim	(Brazil)	25	26	1	—	5	1	19		2		
32	CM	Apostol	(Romania)	7	9		—	2		5		2		

Last updated: 25 May 2011 (UTC)
Source: Match reports in competitive matches, FCSB (in Romanian)
Ordered by start team, game starts and position on pitch (from back right to front left)
0 shown as blank

=== Goalscorers ===
Key

Player left the club in mid-season
Player joined the club in mid-season

Player	Liga I	Cupa României	Europa League	Fixture Total	Friendlies	Total
(Romania) Bogdan Stancu	13	0	3	16	5	21
(Romania) Nicolae Dică	4	2	0	6	5	11
(Romania) Marius Bilașco	5	0	0	5	4	9
(Romania) Romeo Surdu	4	1	0	5	10	15
(Romania) Bănel Nicoliță	4	1	0	5	3	8
(Romania) Cristian Tănase	1	0	2	3	3	6
(Brazil) Maicon	3	0	0	3	2	5
(Portugal) Geraldo Alves	2	0	0	2	1	3
(Romania) Marius Onofraș	2	0	0	2	1	3
(Greece) Pantelis Kapetanos	1	0	1	2	4	6
(Romania) Lucian Burdujan	1	0	0	1	1	2
(Romania) Dorel Stoica	1	0	0	1	0	1
(Romania) Alexandru Păcurar	1	0	0	1	0	1
(Serbia) Novak Martinović	1	0	0	1	0	1
(Romania) Iasmin Latovlevici	0	1	0	1	0	1
(Romania) Florin Gardoș	0	0	1	1	0	1
(Brazil) Éder Bonfim	0	0	1	1	1	2
(Romania) János Székely	0	0	0	0	2	2
(Romania) Mihai Răduț	0	0	0	0	2	2
(Romania) George Galamaz	0	0	0	0	1	1
(Brazil) Ricardo Vilana	0	0	0	0	1	1
(Romania) Cosmin Matei	0	0	0	0	1	1
Own goals
(Romania) Bogdan Pătrașcu	1	0	0	1	0	1
(Romania) ștefan Bărboianu	0	1	0	1	0	1
(Brazil) Emílson Cribari	0	0	1	1	0	1
(Netherlands) Alje Schut	0	0	1	1	0	1

=== Goal minutes ===
1'–15'	16'–30'	31'–HT	46'–60'	61'–75'	76'–FT	Extra time
8	12	5	10	17	8	0

Last updated: 25 May 2011 (UTC)
Source: FCSB (in Romanian)

=== Start formations ===
Qnt	Formation	Match(es)
32	4-2-3-1	4, EL1, 5, EL2, 6, 7, EL3, 8, CR1, 9, EL4, 10, 11, EL5, 12, CR2, 13, EL6, 14, CR3, 15, 16, 17, EL7, 18, 19, 20, 22, 25, 26, 27, 28
7	4-1-4-1	1, 2, 3, EL8, 30, 31, 32
5	4-1-3-2	24, CR4, 33, 34, CR6
3	4-4-2	21, 23, CR5
1	4-5-1	29

Last updated: 25 May 2011 (UTC)
Source: Match reports in Competitive matches
Only competitive matches.

=== Squad stats ===
	Total	Home	Away	Neutral
Games played	48	23	24	1
Games won	21	11	9	1
Games drawn	15	8	7	0
Games lost	12	4	8	0
Biggest win	5–0 vs Unirea Urziceni	5–0 vs Unirea Urziceni	3–0 vs FC Vaslui	2–1 vs Dinamo București
Biggest lose	4–1 vs Liverpool; 3–0 vs FC Brașov	3–0 vs FC Brașov	4–1 vs Liverpool	—
Clean sheets	16	7	9	0
Goals scored	60	37	21	2
Goals conceded	42	22	19	1
Goal difference	+18	+15	+2	+1
Top scorer	Stancu (16)	13	3	0
Winning rate	43.75%	47.83%	37.5%	100%

Last updated: 25 May 2011 (UTC)
Source: Competitive matches

=== International appearances ===
Player	Country	Appearances	Goals
Stanislav Angelov	Bulgaria	v. England v. Montenegro	
Pantelis Kapetanos	Greece	v. South Korea	
Ciprian Tătărușanu	Romania	v. Italy v. Cyprus v. Luxembourg	
Florin Gardoș	Romania	v. Ukraine v. Luxembourg	
Bănel Nicoliță	Romania	v. Turkey	
Iulian Apostol	Romania	v. None^{1}	
Mihai Răduț	Romania	v. None^{1}	
Cristian Tănase	Romania	v. Turkey v. Italy	
Marius Bilașco	Romania	v. Belarus	
Bogdan Stancu	Romania	v. Turkey v. Albania v. Belarus v. France v. Italy	v. Albania
Cezar Lungu	Romania U-21	v. None^{1}	
Florin Gardoș	Romania U-21	v. Russia U-21 v. Russia U-21 v. England U21 v. England U21	
Eric Bicfalvi	Romania U-21	v. Moldova U-21 v. Russia U-21 v. Russia U-21 v. England U21 v. England U21	v. Russia U-21
Andrei Ionescu	Romania U-21	v. Moldova U-21 v. Russia U-21 v. Russia U-21 v. England U21	
Mihai Răduț	Romania U-21	v. Turkey U-21 v. Albania U-21 v. Israel U-21	
Cosmin Matei	Romania U-21	v. Turkey U-21 v. Albania U-21 v. Israel U-21 v. (Georgia (country)) Georgia U-21	v. Israel U-21

Notes

- ^1 Was called for Romania's game but was not used.

== Competitions ==
=== Overall ===
Competition	Started round	Final position / round	First match	Last match
Liga I	—	5th	25 July 2010	21 May 2011
Cupa României	Round of 32	Winners	23 September 2010	25 May 2011
Europa League	Play-off round	3rd / Group stage	19 August 2010	15 December 2010

=== Liga I ===
==== League table ====
Pos	Team	Pld	W	D	L	GF	GA	GD	Pts	Qualification or relegation
3	Vaslui	34	18	11	5	51	28	+23	65	Qualification to Champions League third qualifying round
4	Rapid București	34	16	11	7	43	22	+21	59	Qualification to Europa League play-off round
5	Steaua București	34	16	9	9	44	27	+17	57	Qualification to Europa League play-off round (Note: Steaua București won the 2010–11 Cupa României competition and therefore qualified for the play-off round of the 2011–12 UEFA Europa League.)
6	Dinamo București	34	16	8	10	68	52	+16	56	Qualification to Europa League third qualifying round
7	Gaz Metan Mediaș	34	14	13	7	41	32	+9	55	Qualification to Europa League second qualifying round

Source: LPF (in Romanian)
Rules for classification: 1st points; 2nd head-to-head points; 3rd head-to-head goal difference; 4th head-to-head goals scored; 5th overall goal difference; 6th overall goals scored

==== Results summary ====
Overall								Home						Away					
Pld	W	D	L	GF	GA	GD	Pts	W	D	L	GF	GA	GD	W	D	L	GF	GA	GD
34	16	9	9	44	27	+17	57	9	4	4	28	16	+12	7	5	5	16	11	+5

Source: LT

==== Results by round ====
Round	1	2	3	4	5	6	7	8	9	10	11	12	13	14	15	16	17	18	19	20	21	22	23	24	25	26	27	28	29	30	31	32	33	34
Ground	AR	H	A	H	A	H	A	H	A	H	A	H	A	A	H	A	H	H	A	H	AR	H	A	H	A	H	A	H	AR	H	H	A	H	A
Result	W	W	D	W	W	D	L	D	L	W	L	W	L	D	L	W	D	W	W	L	W	D	D	W	L	W	W	L	D	W	L	D	W	W
Position	3	4	5	4	2	1	3	3	5	4	5	4	6	6	8	7	7	7	6	6	4	6	6	6	5	5	4	6	5	5	6	6	6	5

Source: Matches
A = Away; H = Home; W = Win; D = Draw; L = Loss

==== Points by opponent ====
Team	Results		Points
Team	Home	Away	Points
Astra Ploiești	1–1	0–1	1
Brașov	0–3	1–1	1
CFR Cluj	2–2	3–1	4
Dinamo București	0–1	1–2	0
Gaz Metan Mediaș	0–1	0–0	1
Gloria Bistrița	3–1	0–1	3
Oțelul Galați	1–0	0–1	3
Pandurii Târgu Jiu	2–0	1–1	4
Rapid București	0–1	0–0	1
Sportul Studențesc București	4–2	2–1	6
Târgu Mureș	1–0	1–0	6
Timișoara	1–1	0–0	2
Unirea Urziceni	5–0	0–1	3
Universitatea Cluj	3–0	2–1	6
FC U Craiova	2–1	1–0	6
Vaslui	1–1	3–0	4
Victoria Brănești	2–1	1–0	6

Source: FCSB

==== Matches ====
25 July 2010 Round 1	Universitatea Cluj	1–2	Steaua București	Alba Iulia
18:00	Boștină (yellow card) 3'; Niculescu 8' (pen.), (yellow card) 44'	(Report)	45' D. Stoica; 72', (yellow card) 72' B. Stancu; (yellow card) 80' Abrudan	Stadium: Cetate; Attendance: 7,000 (approx.); Referee: Ovidiu Hațegan

31 July 2010 Round 2	Steaua București	2–1	FC U Craiova	București
20:00	Geraldo (yellow card) 37'; B. Stancu 67'; Surdu 78'; Bicfalvi (yellow card) 89'	(Report)	(yellow card) 17' Găman; (yellow card) 47' Prepeliță; 50' Iliev; (yellow card) 77' Ciucă; (yellow card) 79' M. Costea	Stadium: Steaua; Attendance: 22,968; Referee: Marius Avram

7 August 2010 Round 3	Brașov	1–1	Steaua București	Brașov
21:00	Oroș (yellow card) 21'; Willams (yellow card) 23'; Voicu (yellow card) 82'; Ilyéș 90+1' (pen.)	(Report)	(yellow card) 26' Abrudan; 68', (yellow card) 90' Nicoliță; (yellow card) 87' Răduț; (red card) 90' Stanca	Stadium: Silviu Ploeșteanu; Attendance: 7,500 (approx.); Referee: Cristian Balaj

16 August 2010 Round 4	Steaua București	2–1	Victoria Brănești	București
20:30	B. Stancu 25', 67' (pen.); Nicoliță (yellow card) 78'	(Report)	(yellow card) 47' Simion; 56' (pen.), (yellow card) 65' Olariu; (yellow card) 66' Marincău	Stadium: Steaua; Attendance: 6,997; Referee: Sebastian Colțescu

22 August 2010 Round 5	Vaslui	0–3	Steaua București	Vaslui
20:00	Milanov (yellow card) 43'; Papp (yellow card) 87'	(Report)	5', 53' Surdu; (yellow card) 27' Cr. Tănase; (yellow card) 41' Geraldo; 46' B. Stancu; (yellow card) 76' Păcurar; (yellow card) 90+1' Latovlevici	Stadium: Municipal; Attendance: 8,000 (approx.); Referee: Ovidiu Hațegan

29 August 2010 Round 6	Steaua București	1–1	Timișoara	București
20:00	Păcurar 53'; Geraldo (yellow card) 79'	(Report)	(yellow card) 25' Burcă; 80' Contra; (yellow card) 90+1' Scutaru	Stadium: Steaua; Attendance: 15,720; Referee: Cristian Balaj

11 September 2010 Round 7	Unirea Urziceni	1–0	Steaua București	Urziceni
20:30	Semedo 61'; Cernea (yellow card) 82'	(Report)	(yellow card) 50' Emeghara; (yellow card) 90' Kapetanos	Stadium: Tineretului; Attendance: 6,000 (approx.); Referee: Ionel Ivan

20 September 2010 Round 8	Steaua București	1–1	Astra Ploiești	București
20:30	Kapetanos 17'; Cr. Tănase (yellow card) 38'; Galamaz (yellow card) 70'	(Report)	(yellow card) 52' Strătilă; 72' Mățel; (yellow card) 75' Goian; (yellow card) 89' Miranda; (yellow card) 90' Mihalache; (yellow card) 90+5' Lukacs	Stadium: Steaua; Attendance: 7,000 (approx.); Referee: Robert Dumitru

26 September 2010 Round 9	Oțelul Galați	1–0	Steaua București	Galați
16:30	Sârghi 19'; Sălăgeanu (yellow card) 34'	(Report)	(yellow card) 25' Nicoliță; (yellow card) 65' Surdu; (yellow card) 82' Cr. Tănase	Stadium: Oțelul; Attendance: 12,000 (approx.); Referee: István Kovács

3 October 2010 Round 10	Steaua București	4–2	Sportul Studențesc București	București
20:00	B. Stancu 5', 42'; Pătrașcu 31' (o.g.); Bilașco (yellow card) 63', (goal) 67'	(Report)	3', 90+2' (pen.) Varga; (yellow card) 41' Cruceru; (yellow card) 58' Ferfelea; (yellow card) 82' Pătrașcu; (yellow card) 89' Curelea; (yellow card) 90+3' Chihaia	Stadium: Steaua; Attendance: 7,000 (approx.); Referee: Alexandru Tudor

17 October 2010 Round 11	Dinamo București	2–1	Steaua București	București
20:30	N'Doye (yellow card) 3'; Torje (yellow card) 21'; Ad. Cristea 30' (pen.); Niculae 35' (pen.); Niculae (yellow card) 36'; Alexe (yellow card) 55'		23' B. Stancu; (yellow card) 28' Gardoș; (yellow card) 35' Tătărușanu; (yellow card) 55' Vilana; (yellow card) 64' Apostol; (yellow card) 87' Bilașco	Stadium: Dinamo; Attendance: 12,000 (approx.); Referee: Marius Avram

25 October 2010 Round 12	Steaua București	2–0	Pandurii Târgu Jiu	București
20:30	B. Stancu 62', 70'; Cr. Tănase (yellow card) 77'		(yellow card) 47' Voiculeț; (yellow card) 76' Viera	Stadium: Steaua; Attendance: 6,000 (approx.); Referee: Radu Petrescu

31 October 2010 Round 13	Gloria Bistrița	1–0	Steaua București	Bistrița
19:30	J. Moraes 6' (pen.), (yellow card) 62'; Keita (yellow card) 35'; Frăsinescu (yellow card) 64'; B. Moraes (yellow card) 75'; Albuț (yellow card) 84'		(yellow card) 24' Galamaz; (yellow card) 35' Brandán; (yellow card) 49' Nicoliță; (yellow card) 58' Ricardo	Stadium: Gloria; Attendance: 6,000 (approx.); Referee: Robert Dumitru

8 November 2010 Round 14	Rapid București	0–0	Steaua București	București
20:30	Grigore (yellow card) 25'; Costa (yellow card) 34'; Božović (yellow card) 61'		(yellow card) 15' Ricardo; (yellow card) 90+2' Kapetanos	Stadium: Giulești-Valentin Stănescu; Attendance: 13,000 (approx.); Referee: Cristian Balaj

14 November 2010 Round 15	Steaua București	0–1	Gaz Metan Mediaș	București
17:00	Brandán (yellow card) 37'; Geraldo (yellow card) 37'; Novak (yellow card) 90+3'		4' Eric; (yellow card) 36' Trtovac; (yellow card) 55' Buzean; (yellow card) 69' Pleșca	Stadium: Steaua; Attendance: 0 (close doors); Referee: Teodor Crăciunescu

20 November 2010 Round 16	Târgu Mureș	0–1	Steaua București	Târgu Mureș
14:00	Stere (yellow card) 7'; Bruno Fernandes (red card) 13'; Astafei (yellow card) 18'; Topić (yellow card) 41', (red card) 65'; Roman (yellow card) 64'; Vasilache (red card) 67'		(yellow card) 3' Brandán; (yellow card) 20' Galamaz; (yellow card) 21' Cr. Tănase; (yellow card) 30' Ricardo; (red card) 34' Bicfalvi; (yellow card) 78' Kapetanos; (yellow card) 81' B. Stancu; 90+2' Bilașco	Stadium: Trans-Sil; Attendance: 8,000 (approx.); Referee: Alexandru Tudor

28 November 2010 Round 17	Steaua București	2–2	CFR Cluj	București
21:00	B. Stancu 28', 50' (pen.); Geraldo (yellow card) 49'; Gardoș (yellow card) 69'; Galamaz (yellow card) 75'		11' Culio; (yellow card) 26' Edimar; (yellow card) 27' Nuno Claro; (yellow card) 66', (goal) 82' Peralta; (yellow card) 78' Traoré	Stadium: Steaua; Attendance: 12,000 (approx.); Referee: Marius Avram

6 December 2010 Round 18	Steaua București	3–0	Universitatea Cluj	București
20:30	Novak 21', (yellow card) 28'; Ricardo (yellow card) 64'; Bilașco 66'; Geraldo (yellow card) 74'; Székely (yellow card) 78'; B. Stancu 90'		(yellow card) 41' Piț; (yellow card) 89' Izvoranu	Stadium: Steaua; Attendance: 5,000 (approx.); Referee: Cristian Balaj

27 February 2011 Round 19	FC U Craiova	0–1	Steaua București	Craiova
20:30	Ologu (yellow card) 41'; Prepeliță (yellow card) 57'; Lopes (yellow card) 60'; Dănănae (yellow card) 73'		31' Bilașco; (yellow card) 54' Nicoliță	Stadium: Ion Oblemenco; Attendance: 9,000 (approx.); Referee: Cristian Balaj

7 March 2011 Round 20	Steaua București	0–3	Brașov	București
20:00	Geraldo (yellow card) 20'; Dică (yellow card) 36'; Galamaz (red card) 66'		(yellow card) 27' Toloza; 30' Cristescu; 34' Teixeira; 64' Oroș	Stadium: Steaua; Attendance: 6,000 (approx.); Referee: Alexandru Tudor

11 March 2011 Round 21	Victoria Brănești	0–1	Steaua București	Buzău
20:30	Nicola (yellow card) 4'		(yellow card) 56' Răduț; 63' Onofraș	Stadium: Municipal; Attendance: 10,000 (approx.); Referee: Emil Voicu

19 March 2011 Round 22	Steaua București	1–1	Vaslui	București
20:30	Nicoliță 51'; Székely (yellow card) 53'; Ricardo (yellow card) 60'		(yellow card) 30' Papp; (yellow card) 55' Sânmărtean; (yellow card) 78' Milisavljević; 80' Adaílton	Stadium: Steaua; Attendance: 11,000 (approx.); Referee: István Kovács

2 April 2011 Round 23	Timișoara	0–0	Steaua București	Timișoara
19:30	Rocha (yellow card) 44'; Magera (yellow card) 63'		(yellow card) 18' Bicfalvi; (yellow card) 35' Maicon; (yellow card) 54' Bonfim; (yellow card) 81' Gardoș	Stadium: Dan Păltinișanu; Attendance: 32,000 (approx.); Referee: Cristian Balaj

5 April 2011 Round 24	Steaua București	5–0	Unirea Urziceni	București
20:30	Nicoliță 8', (yellow card) 39'; Geraldo 10', 75'; Dică 63' (pen.); Burdujan 83'; Brandán (yellow card) 85'		(yellow card) 9' Teușan; (yellow card) 64' (yellow-red card) 90+1' Nicu	Stadium: Steaua; Attendance: 6,000 (approx.); Referee: Florin Miron

10 April 2011 Round 25	Astra Ploiești	1–0	Steaua București	Ploiești
21:00	N'Doye (yellow card) 85'; Mihalache 90+1'; Stan (yellow card) 90+2'		(yellow card) 21' Marinescu	Stadium: Astra; Attendance: 5,000 (approx.); Referee: Ovidiu Hațegan

13 April 2011 Round 26	Steaua București	1–0	Oțelul Galați	București
21:30	Maicon 25'; Dică (yellow card) 66'; Nicoliță (yellow card) 79'		(yellow card) 36' Neagu; (yellow card) 56' S. Ilie; (yellow card) 86' Viglianti; (yellow card) Perendija	Stadium: Steaua; Attendance: 5,000 (approx.); Referee: István Kovács

16 April 2011 Round 27	Sportul Studențesc București	1–2	Steaua București	București
17:45	Patriche (yellow card) 41'; Tb. Bălan (yellow card) 55'; Cr. Irimia 65'; Postolache (yellow card) 76'		(yellow card) 75', (goal) 80', 86' Maicon; (yellow card) 81' Bicfalvi	Stadium: Regie; Attendance: 5,000 (approx.); Referee: Robert Dumitru

25 April 2011 Round 28	Steaua București	0–1	Dinamo București	București
20:30	Geraldo (yellow card) 53'; Răduț (yellow card) 79'		(yellow card) 21' C. Munteanu; (yellow card) 43' Bărboianu; 63' Torje; (yellow card) 71' Țucudean; (yellow card) 74' Bordeanu	Stadium: Steaua; Attendance: 23,000 (approx.); Referee: Marius Avram

28 April 2011 Round 29	Pandurii Târgu Jiu	1–1	Steaua București	Drobeta-Turnu Severin
20:30	Štromajer 43'; Pintilii (yellow card) 81'		(yellow card) 27' Bonfim; (yellow card) 29' Maicon; 66' Cr. Tănase	Stadium: Municipal; Attendance: 16,000 (approx.); Referee: Radu Petrescu

1 May 2011 Round 30	Steaua București	3–1	Gloria Bistrița	București
20:30	Onofraș 24'; Dică 43', 51'		26' Bâlbă	Stadium: Steaua; Attendance: 1,972; Referee: Mihai Prodan

4 May 2011 Round 31	Steaua București	0–1	Rapid București	București
20:30	Dică (yellow card) 17'; Nicoliță (yellow card) 71'; Marinescu (yellow card) 81'; Geraldo (yellow card) 86'		(yellow card) 28', (goal) 70' Pancu; (yellow card) 76' Božović; (yellow card) 85' Ezequias; (yellow card) 90+3' Coman	Stadium: Steaua; Attendance: 8,000 (approx.); Referee: Robert Dumitru

8 May 2011 Round 32	Gaz Metan Mediaș	0–0	Steaua București	Mediaș
21:53	A. Munteanu (yellow card) 43'; Todea (yellow card) 59'		(yellow card) 29' Bilașco; (yellow card) 53' Emeghara; (yellow card) 84' Cr. Tănase	Stadium: Gaz Metan; Attendance: 7,000 (approx.); Referee: Teodor Crăciunescu

16 May 2011 Round 33	Steaua București	1–0	Târgu Mureș	București
20:00	Dică 25' (pen.); Brandán (yellow card) 50'; Martinović (yellow card) 76' (yellow-red card) 80'		(yellow card) 70' Iencsi	Stadium: Steaua; Attendance: 2,800 (approx.); Referee: Marius Avram

21 May 2011 Round 34	CFR Cluj	1–3	Steaua București	Cluj-Napoca
17:30	Mureșan (yellow card) 4'; Cadú (yellow card) 22' (yellow-red card) 72'; Koné (yellow card) 37'; Buș 43'; Panin (yellow card) 74'		5' Surdu; (yellow card) 10', (goal) 89' Bilașco; 18', (yellow card) 49' Nicoliță; (yellow card) 41' Bicfalvi; (yellow card) 77' Latovlevici; (yellow card) 90+3' Székely	Stadium: Dr. Constantin Rădulescu; Attendance: 15,000 (approx.); Referee: Sebastian Colțescu

=== Cupa României ===
==== Results ====
23 September 2010 Round of 32	Gaz Metan CFR Craiova	0–1	Steaua București	Craiova
20:30	Oprea (yellow card) 70'; Firoiu (yellow card) 81'	(Report)	(yellow card) 56' Brandán; 63' Nicoliță	Stadium: Ion Oblemenco; Attendance: 6,000 (approx.); Referee: Adrian Comănescu

27 October 2010 Round of 16	Steaua București	1–1 (3–1 p)	Sportul Studențesc București	București
20:45	Latovlevici 72'; Novak (yellow card) 105'; Angelov (yellow card) 112'		19' T. Bălan; (yellow card) 120+1' Niculescu	Stadium: Steaua; Attendance: 3,000 (approx.); Referee: Alexandru Deaconu
	Penalties
	Székely (penalty scored); Bilașco (penalty scored); Kapetanos (penalty missed); Angelov (penalty scored)		(penalty missed) Rațiu; (penalty scored) Irimia; (penalty missed) T. Bălan; (penalty missed) Varga

11 November 2010 Quarterfinals	Rapid București	0–1	Steaua București	București
20:45	António (yellow card) 50'; M. Constantin (yellow card) 54'; Grigore (yellow card) 80'		(yellow card) 45' Brandán; (yellow card) 45+9' Galamaz; 49' Surdu; (yellow card) 62' Cr. Tănase; (yellow card) 65' Novak; (yellow card) 71' Bicfalvi; (yellow card) 85' Gardoș	Stadium: Giulești-Valentin Stănescu; Attendance: 12,500 (approx.); Referee: Alexandru Tudor

21 April 2011 Semifinals; First leg	Steaua București	0–0	Brașov	București
20:45	Bicfalvi (yellow card) 80'			Stadium: Steaua; Attendance: 7,200 (approx.); Referee: Cristian Balaj

11 May 2011 Semifinals; Second leg	Brașov	1–1 (1−1 a agg.)	Steaua București	Brașov
20:45	Ilyéș 41' (pen.); Teixeira (yellow card) 57' (yellow-red card) 87'; Voicu (yellow card) 90+3'		(yellow card) 11', (goal) 86' Dică; (yellow card) 44' Cr. Tănase	Stadium: Silviu Ploeșteanu; Referee: Cristian Balaj

25 May 2011 Final	Dinamo București	1–2	Steaua București	Brașov
21:15	Moți (yellow card) 17'; Torje 33', (yellow card) 69'; Mărgăritescu (yellow card) 78'; Bakaj (yellow card) 90+1'		24' Dică; 51' (o.g.) Bărboianu; (yellow card) 76' Bilașco; (yellow card) 85' Székely; (yellow card) 90' Cr. Tănase; (yellow card) 90+4' Nicoliță	Stadium: Silviu Ploeșteanu; Attendance: 8,000 (approx.); Referee: Marius Avram

=== UEFA Europa League ===
==== Play-off round ====
19 August 2010 First leg	Steaua București (Romania)	1–0	(Switzerland) Grasshopper Zürich	București, Romania
20:45	B. Stancu 71'; Surdu (yellow card) 90+1'	(Report)	(yellow card) 90+1' Salatić	Stadium: Steaua; Attendance: 20,000 (approx.); Referee: Jonas Eriksson (Sweden)

26 August 2010 Second leg	Grasshopper Zürich (Switzerland)	1–0 (a.e.t.) (1–1 agg.) (3–4 p)	(Romania) Steaua București	Zürich, Switzerland
20:30	Salatić 77'; Emeghara (yellow card) 80'; Paulinho (yellow card) 111'	(Report)	(yellow card) 17' Abrudan; (yellow card) 30' Geraldo; (yellow card) 75' Angelov; (yellow card) 81' Emeghara; (yellow card) 92' Latovlevici	Stadium: Letzigrund; Attendance: 5,200 (approx.); Referee: Milorad Mažić (Serbia)
	Penalties
	Smiljanić (penalty missed); Salatić (penalty scored); Abrashi (penalty scored); Hajrović (penalty scored); Adili (penalty missed)		(penalty scored) B. Stancu; (penalty scored) Surdu; (penalty scored) Angelov; (penalty scored) Latovlevici

==== Group stage ====
Group K

Pos	Team	Pld	W	D	L	GF	GA	GD	Pts	Qualification
1	(England) Liverpool	6	2	4	0	8	3	+5	10	Advance to knockout phase
2	(Italy) Napoli	6	1	4	1	8	9	−1	7	Advance to knockout phase
3	(Romania) Steaua București	6	1	3	2	9	11	−2	6	
4	(Netherlands) Utrecht	6	0	5	1	5	7	−2	5	

Source: Soccerway

===== Results =====
16 September 2010 Matchday 1	Liverpool (England)	4–1	(Romania) Steaua București	Liverpool, England
22:05	Cole 1'; Ngog 55' (pen.), 90+1'; Lucas 81'	(Report)	13' Cr. Tănase; (yellow card) 44' Abrudan; (yellow card) 55' Kapetanos; (yellow card) 90+1' Bonfim	Stadium: Anfield; Attendance: 35,000 (approx.); Referee: César Muñiz Fernández (Spain)

30 September 2010 Matchday 2	Steaua București (Romania)	3–3	(Italy) Napoli	București, Romania
20:00	Cribari 2' (o.g.); Cr. Tănase 12'; Kapetanos 16', (red card) 31'; Tătărușanu (yellow card) 63'; Nicoliță (yellow card) 90+8'; Latovlevici (yellow card) 90+8'	(Report)	44' Vitale; (yellow card) 55' Lavezzi; 73' Hamšík; (yellow card) 90+1' Gargano; 90+8' Cavani	Stadium: Steaua; Attendance: 10,230; Referee: Marcin Borski (Poland)

21 October 2010 Matchday 3	Utrecht (Netherlands)	1–1	(Romania) Steaua București	Utrecht, Netherlands
20:00	Mertens (yellow card) 29'; Wuytens (yellow card) 35'; Duplan 60'		(yellow card) 74' Geraldo; 75' (o.g.) Schut; (yellow card) 90+2' Latovlevici	Stadium: Galgenwaard; Attendance: 24,000 (approx.); Referee: Said Ennjimi (France)

4 November 2010 Matchday 4	Steaua București (Romania)	3–1	(Netherlands) Utrecht	București, Romania
22:05	Ricardo (yellow card) 12'; Nicoliță (yellow card) 20'; Gardoș 29'; Novak (yellow card) 38'; B. Stancu 52', 53'		(yellow card) 22' Neșu; 33' Mertens; (yellow card) 90' Wuytens	Stadium: Steaua; Attendance: 16,210; Referee: Stanislav Sukhina (Russia)

2 December 2010 Matchday 5	Steaua București (Romania)	1–1	(England) Liverpool	București, Romania
20:00	Surdu (yellow card) 20'; Bonfim 61', (yellow card) 81'; Nicoliță (yellow card) 63'		19' Jovanović	Stadium: Steaua; Referee: Bülent Yıldırım (Turkey)

15 December 2010 Matchday 6	Napoli (Italy)	1–0	(Romania) Steaua București	Naples, Italy
22:05	Maggio (yellow card) 73'; Cannavaro (yellow card) 76' (yellow-red card) 90+6'; Cavani 90+3'; Zúñiga (yellow card) 90+4'		(yellow card) 11' Székely; (yellow card) 66' Bonfim; (yellow card) 81' Surdu; (yellow card) 90+6' Novak	Stadium: San Paolo; Referee: Pavel Královec (Czech Republic)

=== Non competitive matches ===
27 June 2010 Matchday 1	Steaua București (Romania)	2–0	(Cyprus) APOEL	Austria
	Cr. Tănase 49'; Surdu 72'	FCSB		Referee: Alexandru Tudor

30 June 2010 Matchday 2	Steaua București (Romania)	1–0	(Czech Republic) Viktoria Plzeň	Bad Gastein, Austria
	B. Stancu 75'	FCSB		Stadium: Alpenstadion Bad Gastein; Referee: Alexandru Tudor

7 July 2010 Matchday 3	Steaua București (Romania)	4–1	(Poland) Zagłębie Lubin	Austria
	Nicoliță 8'; B. Stancu 28', 73'; Surdu 70'	FCSB	18' Kędziora	Referee: Cristian Balaj

9 July 2010 Matchday 4	Steaua București (Romania)	1–0	(Greece) Olympiacos	Aschheim, Germany
	B. Stancu 13'	FCSB

11 July 2010 Matchday 5	Steaua București (Romania)	1–0	(Hungary) Ferencváros
	Surdu 30'	FCSB

13 July 2010 Matchday 6	Swarovski Wattens (Austria)	0–3	(Romania) Steaua București	Wattens, Austria
		FCSB; Match suspended in min. 80.	22' B. Stancu; 23' Nicoliță; 70' Surdu	Stadium: Alpenstadion Watten

9 October 2010 Matchday 7	Steaua București (Romania)	9–0	(Romania) Tunari	București, Romania
11:00	Kapetanos 9', 15', 40', 66'; Surdu 17', 55'; Cr. Tănase 60', 70'; Matei 83'			Stadium: Steaua Complex

21 January 2011 Matchday 8	Steaua București (Romania)	2–0	(Germany) Hoffenheim II	Antalya, Turkey
15:00	Székely 19'; Ricardo 44'			Stadium: Arcadia Complex

24 January 2011 Matchday 9	Steaua București (Romania)	1–1	(Austria) Kapfenberger SV	Antalya, Turkey
18:00	Răduț 61'		69' Gregoritsch	Stadium: Arcadia Complex

31 January 2011 Matchday 10	Steaua București (Romania)	4–1	(Moldova) Sheriff Tiraspol	Turkey
17:00	Dică 17', 60', 61'; Galamaz 35'		73' Jymmy

2 February 2011 Matchday 11	Steaua București (Romania)	1–1	(Croatia) Dinamo Zagreb	Turkey
	Bilașco 53'		38' Morales

6 February 2011 Matchday 12	Steaua București (Romania)	1–2	(Poland) Lech Poznań	Belek, Turkey
	Nicoliță 51'		8' Rudņevs; 39' Krivets

8 February 2011 Matchday 13	Steaua București (Romania)	1–0	(Slovenia) Koper	Turkey
	Surdu 81' (pen.)

10 February 2011 Matchday 14	Steaua București (Romania)	0–0	(Serbia) Red Star Belgrade	Turkey

13 February 2011 Matchday 15	Steaua București (Romania)	1–1	(Hungary) Debrecen	Turkey
	Geraldo 28'		34' Kabát

20 February 2011 Matchday 16	Steaua București (Romania)	11–0	(Romania) Tunari	București, Romania
	Bilașco 2', 14'; Dică 5', 16'; Surdu 30', 41'; Bonfim 42'; Székely 50'; Onofraș 62'; Răduț 64'; Burdujan 80'			Stadium: Steaua Complex

26 March 2011 Matchday 17	Dacia Chișinău (Moldova)	0–4	(Romania) Steaua București	Chișinău, Moldova
17:00			18' Surdu; 35', 43' Maicon; 90+2' Bilașco	Stadium: Zimbru

== UEFA Club rankings ==
This is the current UEFA Club Rankings, including season 2009–10.

Rank	Team	Points	Mvmnt
35	(Germany) Schalke 04	54.841	▼ (–10)
36	(Spain) Espanyol	53.951	▼ (–3)
37	(Germany) Stuttgart	52.841	▲ (+6)
38	(Switzerland) Basel	48.675	▼ (–1)
39	(Netherlands) AZ Alkmaar	48.309	▼ (–17)
40	(Romania) Steaua București	47.898	▼ (–8)
41	(France) Lille	46.748	▼ (–1)
42	(England) Everton	44.371	▲ (+12)
43	(Turkey) Galatasaray	43.890	▲ (+17)
44	(Ukraine) Dynamo Kyiv	42.910	▼ (–3)
45	(Belgium) Anderlecht	42.580	▲ (+20)
