= Claudiu =

Claudiu is a Romanian male given name derived from Latin Claudius. The female form is Claudia.

Notable people with the name include:

- Claudiu Bălan, Romanian professional footballer
- Claudiu Baștea (born 1979), Romanian judoka
- Claudiu Belu (born 1993), Romanian footballer
- Claudiu Bleonț (born 1959), Romanian film and theatre actor, comedian, television celebrity, and television presenter
- Claudiu Boaru (born 1977), Romanian footballer
- Claudiu Borțoneanu (born 1999), Romanian footballer
- Claudiu Bumba (born 1994), Romanian footballer
- Claudiu Bunea (born 1981), Romanian footballer
- Claudiu Codoban (born 1988), Romanian professional footballer
- Claudiu Cornaci (born 1975), Romanian former professional footballer
- Claudiu Crăciun (born 1978), Romanian academic, activist and politician
- Claudiu David (born 1978), Romanian rally driver
- Claudiu Drăgan (born 1979), Romanian footballer
- Claudiu Dumitrescu (born 1979), Romanian footballer
- Claudiu M. Florian, Romanian writer
- Claudiu Grozea (born 1982), Romanian speed skater
- Claudiu Herea (born 1990), Romanian footballer
- Claudiu Ionescu (disambiguation), several people
- Claudiu Isopescu (1894–1956), Austro-Hungarian-born Romanian literary historian and translator
- Claudiu Juncănaru (born 1996), Romanian footballer
- Claudiu Keșerü (born 1986), Romanian footballer
- Claudiu Manda (born 1975), Romanian politician
- Claudiu Micovschi (born 1999), Romanian footballer
- Claudiu Moisie, Romanian footballer
- Claudiu Năsui (born 1985), Romanian politician
- Claudiu Negoescu, Romanian footballer
- Claudiu Niculescu (born 1976), Romanian football player and manager
- Claudiu Pamfile (born 1997), Romanian footballer
- Claudiu Pascariu (born 1988), Romanian association football player
- Claudiu Petrila (born 2000), Romanian footballer
- Claudiu Răducanu (born 1976), Romanian footballer
- Claudiu Rusu (born 1949), Romanian water polo player
- Claudiu Stan, Romanian footballer
- Claudiu Tămăduianu (born 1962), Romanian wrestler
- Claudiu Târziu (born 1973), Romanian politician and journalist
- Claudiu Teohari (born 1981), Romanian stand-up comedian
- Claudiu Tudor (born 1985), Romanian professional wrestler
- Claudiu Vaișcovici (born 1962), Romanian footballer
- Claudiu Vîlcu (born 1987), Romanian footballer
- Claudiu Voiculeț (born 1985), Romanian footballer
