= Ricardo Vilana =

Brazilian footballer (born 1981)

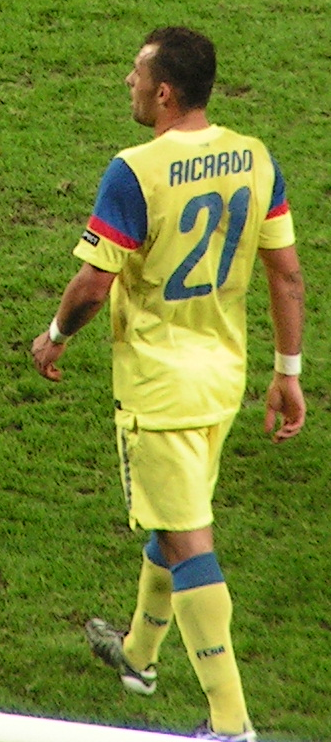

Personal information
- Full name: Ricardo Gomes Vilana
- Date of birth: 18 July 1981 (age 45)
- Place of birth: São Paulo, Brazil
- Height: 1.79 m (5 ft 10 in)
- Position: Defensive midfielder

Youth career
- 2000–2001: Portuguesa

Senior career*
Years	Team	Apps	(Gls)
2002	Portuguesa		
2002–2004	Malcantone Agno		
2006–2010	Unirea Urziceni	72	(1)
2010–2011	Steaua București	16	(0)
2011–2012	Khazar Lankaran	16	(2)
2013–2015	FC Andorra		
2015	Guaratinguetá	14	(0)
2016	Coritiba	0	(0)
Total		118	(3)
- * Club domestic league appearances and goals

Ricardo Gomes Vilana (born 18 July 1981) is a Brazilian former professional footballer who played as a defensive midfielder.

== Career ==
=== Early career ===
Vilana was born on 18 July 1981 in São Paulo, Brazil and began playing football at local club, Portuguesa. Subsequently, in 2002 he moved to play in the Swiss lower leagues for Malcantone Agno. There, he spent two seasons, helping the team gain promotion from the third to the second league during his first season. After his daughter was born, Vilana decided to stop playing football and instead played futsal.

=== Unirea Urziceni ===
Vilana returned to playing football about two years later, being convinced to sign with Romanian club Unirea Urziceni by his brother-in-law, Alex Leandro, who was playing there. Vilana made his Liga I debut on 10 September 2006 when coach Costel Orac sent him to replace Alexandru Pojer in the 85th minute of a 2–0 home win over Național București. The club reached the 2008 Cupa României final and he played the entire match under coach Dan Petrescu in the 2–1 loss to CFR Cluj. Subsequently, Vilana helped the club win the 2008–09 title, as coach Petrescu used him in 20 games, scoring once in a 2–0 away victory against Politehnica Iași.

He started the following season by replacing Sorin Paraschiv in the 81st minute of the penalty shoot-out loss to CFR Cluj in the 2009 Supercupa României. Afterwards, Vilana made five appearances in the 2009–10 Champions League group stage, playing against VfB Stuttgart, Sevilla and Rangers, as the team earned eight points and finished third. Thus they qualified to the round of 32 of the Europa League where he played in both legs of the 4–1 aggregate loss to Liverpool.

=== Steaua București ===
In August 2010, Vilana signed a contract with Steaua București alongside teammates from Unirea Urziceni: Galamaz, Marinescu, Apostol, Bilașco, Onofraș and Brandán.

First he was sent by coach Ilie Dumitrescu to play in Liga II for the team's satellite club, Steaua II București, making his debut against Juventus București, which the team won 1–0 with his goal. Afterwards he started to play for the first team, including making five appearances in the 2010–11 Europa League group stage against Liverpool, Napoli and Utrecht, but failing to qualify further as they finished third. The team won the Cupa României, but Vilana did not get to play in the final, as he and fellow Brazilian Éder Bonfim terminated their contracts on mutual agreement with the club on 4 May 2011.

=== Khazar Lankaran ===
Vilana and Bonfim went together to play for Khazar Lankaran in Azerbaijan, being brought there by Romanian coach, Mircea Rednic. He left the club after about one year in which the team finished runner-up in the 2011–12 season, and also made appearances in qualification rounds of the Europa League.

=== Late career ===
In 2013, Vilana signed a contract with FC Andorra in the Spanish fifth league. He subsequently returned to Brazil, playing for Guaratinguetá in Série C and joining Série A club Coritiba in 2016, though he did not feature in any matches there.

== Honours ==
Malcantone Agno

- Swiss 1. Liga: 2002–03

Unirea Urziceni

- Liga I: 2008–09
- Cupa României runner-up: 2007–08
- Supercupa României runner-up: 2009

Steaua București

- Cupa României: 2010–11
