= Raúl Martín =

Raúl Martín may refer to:

- Raúl Martín (footballer, born 1979), Spanish football midfielder
- Raúl Martín (footballer, born 1982), Spanish football forward
- Raúl Martín (bishop) (born 1957), bishop of Santa Rosa, Argentina
- Raúl Martín (artist), Spanish paleoartist
- Raúl Martín (swimmer) (born 1941), Cuban Olympic swimmer
