= 2011 Cupa României final =

- Event: 2010–11 Cupa României
| Dinamo București | Steaua București |
| 1 | 2 |
- Date: 25 May 2011
- Venue: Silviu Ploeşteanu, Brașov
- Man of the Match: Nicolae Dică (Steaua)
- Referee: Marius Avram
- Attendance: 7,500

The 2011 Cupa României final was the 11th final of the Cupa României between the archrivals Dinamo București and Steaua București. The match took place on 25 May 2011 at the Silviu Ploeşteanu stadium in Brașov. Steaua won the 21st cup in the club's history after beating Dinamo 2–1.

== Pre-match ==
=== Opening ceremony ===
Start of the match was given by the winner fan of "Drumul Mingii" (The Road of the Ball), including Romanian football legends like Ilie Balaci, Adrian Bumbescu, Rodion Cămătaru and Sorin Cârțu.

== Route to the final ==
Dinamo București

| Round of 32 | Dinamo București | 2–0 | Ceahlăul Piatra Neamț |
| Round of 16 | Dinamo București | 3–1 | Alro Slatina |
| Quarter-finals | Dinamo București | 1 – 1; 3 – 1 (pen.) | Universitatea Craiova |
| Semifinals 1st Leg | Gloria Bistrița | 0–2 | Dinamo București |
| Semifinals 2nd Leg | Dinamo București | 5 – 1 agg.: 7 – 1 | Gloria Bistrița |

Steaua București

| Round of 32 | Gaz Metan CFR Craiova | 0–1 | Steaua București |
| Round of 16 | Steaua București | 1 – 1; 3 – 1 (pen.) | Sportul Studențesc |
| Quarter-finals | Rapid București | 0–1 | Steaua București |
| Semifinals 1st Leg | Steaua București | 0–0 | Brașov |
| Semifinals 2nd Leg | Brașov | 1 – 1 agg.: 1 – 1 (a) | Steaua București |

== Match ==
=== Details ===
25 May 2011
21:15 EEST

| Dinamo București | 1–2 | Steaua București |
|---|---|---|
| Torje 33' | Report | Dică 24'; Bărboianu 51' (o.g.) |

Silviu Ploeșteanu, Brașov
Attendance: 7,500
Referee: Marius Avram

| Dinamo București | Steaua București |

DINAMO:
| GK | 34 | (Romania) Cristian Bălgrădean |
| RB | 18 | (Romania) Ștefan Bărboianu |
| CB | 21 | (Romania) Dragoș Grigore |
| CB | 4 | (Romania) Cosmin Moți | (yellow card) 17' |
| LB | 16 | (Romania) Valeriu Bordeanu |
| RW | 22 | (Romania) Gabriel Torje | (yellow card) 69' |
| DM | 5 | (Burkina Faso) Djakaridja Koné | | (substituted off) 72' |
| CM | 6 | (Romania) Andrei Mărgăritescu | (yellow card) 78' | (substituted off) 87' |
| CM | 7 | (Romania) Cătălin Munteanu |
| LW | 10 | (Romania) Marius Alexe |
| FW | 25 | (Romania) Ionel Dănciulescu (c) | | (substituted off) 69' |
Substitutes:
| GK | 23 | (North Macedonia) Kristijan Naumovski |
| DM | 8 | (Romania) Bogdan Pătrașcu |
| FW | 9 | (Romania) George Țucudean | | (substituted on) 87' |
| RB | 17 | (Romania) Eugen Crăciun |
| FW | 19 | (Romania) Liviu Ganea | | (substituted on) 69' |
| FW | 20 | (Albania) Elis Bakaj | (yellow card) 90+1' | (substituted on) 72' |
| CB | 24 | (Romania) Valerică Găman |
Manager:
(Romania) Ioan Andone

STEAUA:
| GK | 12 | (Romania) Ciprian Tătărușanu (c) |
| RB | 2 | (Nigeria) Ifeanyi Emeghara |
| CB | 6 | (Romania) Florin Gardoș |
| CB | 22 | (Romania) George Galamaz |
| LB | 14 | (Romania) Iasmin Latovlevici |
| RW | 16 | (Romania) Bănel Nicoliță | (yellow card) 90+4' |
| DM | 5 | (Argentina) Pablo Brandán |
| AM | 10 | (Romania) Cristian Tănase | (yellow card) 89' | (substituted off) 89' |
| LW | 24 | (Romania) Romeo Surdu |
| FW | 20 | (Romania) Nicolae Dică | | (substituted off) 62' |
| FW | 17 | (Romania) Marius Bilașco | (yellow card) 75' | (substituted off) 75' |
Substitutes:
| GK | 1 | (Romania) Răzvan Stanca |
| CB | 4 | (Bulgaria) Valentin Iliev | | (substituted on) 89' |
| RW | 7 | (Romania) János Székely | (yellow card) 85' | (substituted on) 75' |
| AM | 8 | (Romania) Mihai Răduț |
| RW | 11 | (Romania) Marius Onofraș |
| CM | 26 | (Romania) Eric Bicfalvi | | (substituted on) 62' |
| FW | 99 | (Brazil) Maicon |
Manager:
(Romania) Gabriel Caramarin

MAN OF THE MATCH

- (Romania) Nicolae Dică (Steaua)

MATCH OFFICIALS

- Assistant referees:
  - Micloș Nagy
  - Sebastian Gheorghe
- Fourth official:
  - Robert Dumitru

MATCH RULES

- 90 minutes.
- 30 minutes of extra-time if necessary.
- Penalty shoot-out if scores still level.
- Seven named substitutes.
- Maximum of three substitutions.

== See also ==
- List of Cupa României finals
- Eternal derby (Romania)
