= Laurențiu Marinescu =

Romanian footballer

Personal information
- Full name: Laurențiu Nicolae Marinescu
- Date of birth: 25 August 1984 (age 42)
- Place of birth: Ploiești, Romania
- Height: 1.77 m (5 ft 10 in)
- Position: Attacking midfielder

Team information
- Current team: Petrolul Ploiești (fitness coach)

Youth career
- –2002: Petrolul Ploiești

Senior career*
Years	Team	Apps	(Gls)
2002–2009	Petrolul Ploiești	170	(32)
2009–2010	Unirea Urziceni	19	(2)
2010–2011	Steaua București	16	(0)
2011–2012	Universitatea Cluj	28	(2)
2012–2016	Petrolul Ploiești	80	(6)
2016–2018	Voluntari	71	(9)
2018	Dunărea Călărași	1	(0)
2018–2020	Petrolul Ploiești	50	(13)
2020	Mioveni	8	(0)
Total		443	(64)

International career
2012	Romania	1	(0)

Managerial career
- 2022–: Petrolul Ploiești (fitness coach)
- * Club domestic league appearances and goals

Laurențiu Nicolae Marinescu (born 25 August 1984) is a Romanian former professional footballer who played as a midfielder and currently he is a fitness coach at Liga I club Petrolul Ploiești.

== Club career ==
Marinescu was born on 25 August 1984 in Ploiești, Romania and began playing junior-level football at local club Petrolul. He started to play senior-level football for Petrolul during the 2002–03 Divizia B season, helping the team earn promotion to the first division at the end of it. Afterwards, on 9 August 2003 he made his Divizia A debut when coach Florin Marin sent him in the 79th minute to replace Daniel Costescu in a 4–1 away loss to Ceahlăul Piatra Neamț. He netted his first goal in the competition in a 5–2 home loss to Gloria Bistrița. At the end of the season the team was relegated back to the second division where Marinescu would play for the following five seasons.

In 2009, he was transferred by title holders Unirea Urziceni from Petrolul. In the first league match that coach Dan Petrescu used him, Marinescu scored the only goal in a win over Unirea Alba Iulia, helping Urziceni finish the season in second place. He also made his debut in European competitions, playing in a 1–0 loss to Liverpool at Anfield in the round of 32 of the Europa League. Marinescu started the following season by playing in both legs of Urziceni's 1–0 aggregate loss to Zenit Saint Petersburg in the 2010–11 Champions League third qualifying round. Then he played in a 4–1 loss to Hajduk Split in the 2010–11 Europa League play-off.

In August 2010 he signed a contract with Steaua București alongside teammates from Unirea Urziceni: Galamaz, Vilana, Apostol, Bilașco, Onofraș and Brandán. With Steaua he won the 2010–11 Cupa României despite not playing in the final.

In the summer of 2011 he went to play for Universitatea Cluj. One year later, in the summer of 2012, Marinescu was transferred back to Petrolul Ploiești, along with 11 other players from "U" Cluj, a move that occurred when the owner of the Cluj team left the club to take control of Petrolul. There, he suffered an injury to the ligaments in May 2013 during a game against Concordia Chiajna. Shortly afterwards, the team won the 2012–13 Cupa României without him playing in the final. About one year later, in April 2014, Marinescu came back to the field and scored in a 3–0 win over Botoșani. He played three games in Petrolul's 2014–15 Europa League campaign, getting past Flamurtari and Viktoria Plzeň, being eliminated by Dinamo Zagreb in the play-off.

In 2016, Marinescu left Petrolul to sign with Voluntari. His first achievement with Voluntari was winning the 2016–17 Cupa României, being used the entire match by coach Claudiu Niculescu in the final against Astra Giurgiu, equalizing the score in the 83rd minute from a penalty, and also netted his spot kick at the penalty shoot-out. Shortly afterwards he won another trophy, coach Niculescu using him the full 90 minutes in the 1–0 win over Viitorul Constanța in the 2017 Supercupa României.

In 2018, he joined Dunărea Călărași where on 12 August coach Dan Alexa used him to substitute Aitor Monroy in a 3–1 loss to Universitatea Craiova in the league. That would be his only appearance for the club before he left to play for Petrolul in the second division, having already accumulated a total of 239 matches with 21 goals netted in the Romanian top-division throughout his career. In his two seasons spent at Petrolul, the team fought unsuccessfully to earn promotion to the first division, Marinescu leaving after a conflict with the fans. Afterwards he went to play for Mioveni where he ended his career during the 2020–21 Liga II season.

== International career ==
Marinescu played one friendly game for Romania, when coach Victor Pițurcă introduced him at half-time to replace Dorin Goga in a 4–0 victory against Turkmenistan played on 27 January 2012.

== Honours ==
Petrolul Ploiești

- Divizia B: 2002–03
- Cupa României: 2012–13
- Supercupa României runner-up: 2013

Steaua București

- Cupa României: 2010–11

Voluntari

- Cupa României: 2016–17
- Supercupa României: 2017
