= Răzvan Stanca =

Romanian footballer

Personal information
- Full name: Răzvan Marian Stanca
- Date of birth: 18 January 1980 (age 46)
- Place of birth: Bucharest, Romania
- Height: 1.87 m (6 ft 1 1/2 in)
- Position: Goalkeeper

Team information
- Current team: CS Dinamo București (GK coach); Romania U21 (GK coach)

Youth career
- –1998: Sportul Studențesc

Senior career*
Years	Team	Apps	(Gls)
1998–2005	Sportul Studențesc	149	(0)
2005–2008	Farul Constanța	4	(0)
2007	→ Sportul Studențesc (loan)	19	(0)
2007–2008	→ Dacia Mioveni (loan)	28	(0)
2008–2010	Pandurii Târgu Jiu	46	(0)
2010	→ Steaua București (loan)	1	(0)
2010	→ Universitatea Craiova (loan)	11	(0)
2011–2013	Steaua București	13	(0)
2013–2018	Pandurii Târgu Jiu	83	(0)
Total		354	(0)

International career
2008	Romania	1	(0)

Managerial career
- 2018–2019: Pandurii Târgu Jiu (GK coach)
- 2019: Argeș Pitești (GK coach)
- 2020: Filiași (GK coach)
- 2020–2021: Turris Turnu Măgurele (GK coach)
- 2021–: Romania U21 (GK coach)
- 2026: Chindia Târgoviște (GK coach)
- 2026–: CS Dinamo București (GK coach)
- * Club domestic league appearances and goals

Răzvan Marian Stanca (born 18 January 1980) is a Romanian former professional footballer, currently goalkeeping coach at Liga II club CS Dinamo București and the Romania national under-21 team.

== Career ==
=== Pandurii ===
In 2008, Stanca signed a contract with Liga I club, Pandurii Târgu Jiu. After 2 years, where he appeared as holder for 45 times, he was remarked and was loaned to Steaua and after to Universitatea Craiova.

=== Steaua ===
On 7 August 2010, at his Liga I debut for Steaua, against FC Brașov, he was sent off and the opposing team received a penalty kick in the 90th minute, Robert Ilyeș equalized and the match ended 1-1.

After only 2 months, because Victor Pițurcă coach resigned on round 3 of new season and the new manager no longer need his services, he was sent to the second team. Later, he was loaned to Universitatea Craiova, where he arrived after Victor Pițurcă joined the club as the general manager.

In January 2011, he returned to Steaua. He spent here 2 years and appeared as holder 13 times.

=== Return to Pandurii ===
In July 2013, Stanca returned to Pandurii.

== Honours ==
Sportul Studențesc

- Divizia B: 2000–01, 2003–04

Steaua București

- Liga I: 2012–13
- Cupa României: 2011
- Supercupa României runner-up: 2011

Pandurii Târgu Jiu

- Cupa Ligii runner-up: 2014–15
