= Gabriel Caramarin =

Romanian footballer

Personal information
- Date of birth: 7 September 1977 (age 49)
- Place of birth: Măcin, Romania
- Height: 1.69 m (5 ft 7 in)
- Position: Midfielder

Youth career
- CSȘ București
- –1995: Sportul Studenţesc

Senior career*
Years	Team	Apps	(Gls)
1995–1998	Sportul Studenţesc	17	(9)
1996–1997	→ Gloria Bistriţa (loan)	1	(0)
1998–2004	Naţional București	170	(37)
2005–2007	Politehnica Timişoara	53	(8)
2008–2009	Otopeni	31	(5)
Total		272	(60)

International career
1996–1998	Romania U21	8	(1)
2004	Romania	4	(1)

Managerial career
- 2010: Unirea Urziceni (assistant)
- 2010: Unirea Urziceni (caretaker)
- 2010–2011: Steaua București (assistant)
- 2011: Steaua București (caretaker)
- 2011–2013: Anorthosis Famagusta (assistant)
- 2015–2017: Al-Ahli (assistant)
- 2018–2021: Jiangsu Suning (assistant)
- 2021–2025: Sharjah (assistant)
- 2025–2026: United Arab Emirates (assistant)
- * Club domestic league appearances and goals

Gabriel Gheorghe Caramarin (born 7 September 1977) is a Romanian football coach and former player.

== Career ==
Caramarin was born in Măcin. He began his career at Sportul Studenţesc and made his debut in the Divizia A in 1994. After a short interlude at Gloria Bistrita, he rejoined Sportul in 1997, playing 16 matches for the Bucharest-based team. As Sportul relegated, he moved to FC Naţional, where he spent the next seven years of his career, making over 150 first league appearances. He joined Poli in the winter break of the 2004–05 season, together with Național coach Cosmin Olăroiu and teammates Gabriel Cânu, Gigel Coman and Marius Popa.

== International career ==
Caramarin made his debut for the Romania national team in a friendly against Germany, and scored on his debut in a 5–1 win. He went on to make another three appearances for Romania.

Appearances and goals by national team and year
National team	Year	Apps	Goals
Romania	2004	4	1
Total		4	1

Scores and results list Romania's goal tally first, score column indicates score after each Caramarin goal.

List of international goals scored by Mihăiță Pleșan
No.	Date	Venue	Opponent	Score	Result	Competition
1	28 April 2004	Stadionul Giulești-Valentin Stănescu, Bucharest, Romania	Germany	5–0	5–1	Friendly

== Coaching career ==
After retiring in 2009, he became the assistant coach of Unirea Urziceni and later Steaua București.

He won the Cupa României with Steaua București in 2011 as caretaker head coach.

== Honours ==
=== Player ===
Național București

- Cupa României runner-up: 2002–03

Politehnica Timișoara

- Cupa României runner-up: 2006–07

=== Manager ===
Steaua București

- Cupa României: 2010–11
