= Marius Onofraș =

Romanian footballer

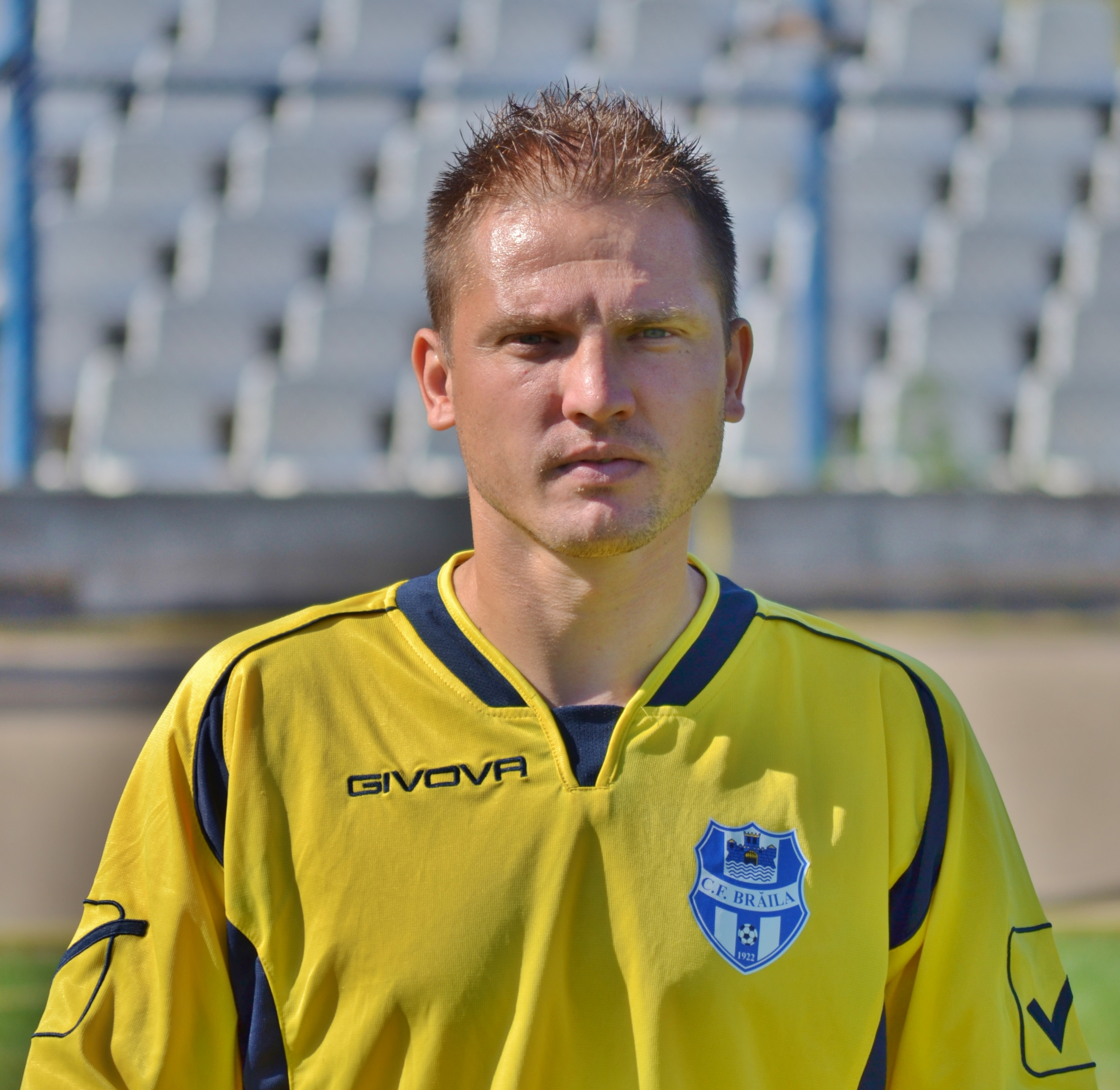
- Onofraș at Dacia Unirea Brăila

Personal information
- Full name: Daniel Marius Onofraș
- Date of birth: 17 August 1980 (age 46)
- Place of birth: Iași, Romania
- Height: 1.78 m (5 ft 10 in)
- Positions: Winger; forward

Team information
- Current team: USV Iași (team manager)

Youth career
- –1998: Politehnica Iaşi

Senior career*
Years	Team	Apps	(Gls)
1998–2000	Politehnica Iaşi	46	(7)
2000–2004	FC Brașov	86	(6)
2004–2006	Politehnica Iaşi	67	(10)
2006–2010	Unirea Urziceni	97	(23)
2010–2011	Steaua București	13	(1)
2011	Khazar Lankaran	0	(0)
2011–2014	CSMS Iași	89	(18)
2014–2016	Dacia Unirea Brăila	56	(11)
2018–2022	Bradu Borca	107	(35)
2022–2024	Flacăra Erbiceni	43	(7)
Total		602	(118)

Managerial career
- 2017–2026: Politehnica Iași (team manager)
- 2026–: USV Iași (team manager)
- * Club domestic league appearances and goals

Daniel Marius Onofraș (born 17 August 1980) is a Romanian former professional footballer and current team manager of Liga III club USV Iași.

== Career ==
=== Early years ===
Marius Onofraș started his career at hometown club Politehnica Iași, moving through the youth systems and making his debut in the senior squad in 1998.

Wanting to play in the Romanian Liga I, he moved to FC Brașov. Onofraş had a successful spell at FC Brașov playing also in the UEFA Europa League. In the summer of 2004 he rejoined his hometown club Politehnica Iași, now playing in the Romanian Liga I. With his good performances he helped them avoid relegation from the first tier of Romanian football.

=== Unirea Urziceni ===
Being spotted by Unirea Urziceni manager Dan Petrescu as a great talent he was bought alongside Politehnica Iași teammate Valeriu Bordeanu. He later signed a four-and-a-half-year contract with the Urziceni team. He went on to win the 2008–09 Liga I and play in UEFA Champions League, where he scored a goal in a 4–1 win against Rangers.

=== Steaua București ===
In August 2010 he signed a contract with Steaua București alongside teammates from Unirea Urziceni: Galamaz, Ricardo, Marinescu, Apostol, Bilașco and next week Brandán. On 11 May 2011, Onofraș scored his first goal for Steaua against Gloria Bistrița in a Liga I home match, helping Steaua win with 3–1. In June 2011, Onofra; left Steaua.

In the summer of 2011 he joined Azerbaijan team Khazar Lankaran. In August, after only two matches, Onofraş left the team.

=== Politehnica Iași ===
In the same month he signed a two-year contract with his hometown club Politehnica Iași. On 3 September, Onofraş scored the winning goal against Gloria Buzău, in extra time, to bring all the points to Politehnica. In a game against Dunărea Galaţi he scored a goal only to help the team earn a draw.

Although there were talks that Onofraş will leave the team in the winter break, the player confirmed that he was committed to bringing the team to the first league.

On 28 April 2012, Onofraş scored the last two goals in the 4–2 victory against CS Otopeni. Politehnica turned the score around from 0–2 to stay in the fight for promotion. On 2 June, Onofraș captained his team to a 4–2 victory against Farul Constanța, and subsequent Liga II title and promotion to Liga I.

== Career statistics ==
=== Club ===
Club	Season	League		Cup		Europe		Total	
Club	Season	Apps	Goals	Apps	Goals	Apps	Goals	Apps	Goals
Politehnica Iaşi
Politehnica Iaşi	1998–99	15	1	0	0	—		15	1
Politehnica Iaşi	1999–00	31	6	2	1	—		33	7
Total		46	7	2	1	—		48	8
FC Brașov
FC Brașov	2000–01	8	0	0	0	—		8	0
FC Brașov	2001–02	26	3	3	4	1	0	30	7
FC Brașov	2002–03	26	2	1	0	—		27	2
FC Brașov	2003–04	25	1	1	0	—		26	1
Total		85	6	5	4	1	0	91	10
Politehnica Iaşi
Politehnica Iaşi	2004–05	21	4	1	0	—		22	4
Politehnica Iaşi	2005–06	28	1	3	2	—		31	3
Politehnica Iaşi	2006–07	18	5	1	1	—		19	6
Total		67	10	5	3	—		72	13
Unirea Urziceni
Unirea Urziceni	2006–07	12	1	0	0	—		12	1
Unirea Urziceni	2007–08	30	6	4	2	—		34	8
Unirea Urziceni	2008–09	22	8	1	0	2	0	25	8
Unirea Urziceni	2009–10	27	8	2	0	6	1	35	9
Unirea Urziceni	2010–11	6	0	0	0	4	0	10	0
Total		97	23	7	2	12	1	116	26
Steaua București
Steaua București	2010–11	12	1	2	0	0	0	14	1
Khazar Lankaran
Khazar Lankaran	2011–12	0	0	0	0	2	0	2	0
Politehnica Iași
Politehnica Iași	2011–12	28	6	1	0	—		29	6
Politehnica Iași	2012–13	29	7	1	0	—		30	7
Politehnica Iași	2013–14	32	5	1	1	—		33	6
Total		89	18	3	1	—		92	19
Dacia Unirea Brăila
Dacia Unirea Brăila	2014–15	24	4	2	0	—		26	4
Dacia Unirea Brăila	2015–16	32	7	2	0	—		34	7
Total		56	11	4	0	—		60	11
Career total		452	76	28	11	15	1	495	88

== Honours ==
Unirea Urziceni

- Liga I: 2008–09

Steaua București

- Cupa României: 2010–11

CSMS Iași

- Liga II: 2011–12, 2013–14

Bradu Borca

- Liga IV – Neamț County: 2019–20

Flacăra Erbiceni

- Liga IV – Iași County: 2021–22
