= Eugen Baciu =

Romanian footballer

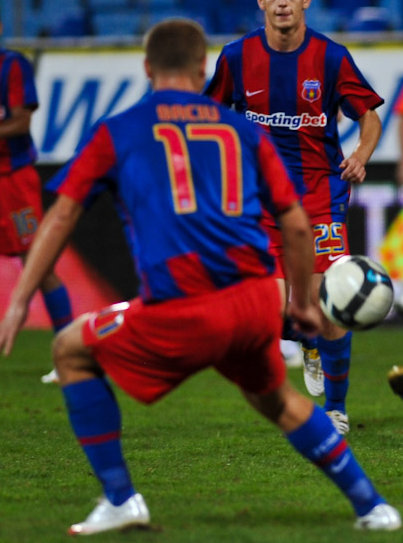

Personal information
- Full name: Eugen Cătălin Baciu
- Date of birth: 25 May 1980 (age 46)
- Place of birth: Vaslui, Romania
- Height: 1.79 m (5 ft 10 1/2 in)
- Position: Centre back

Senior career*
Years	Team	Apps	(Gls)
2000–2001	Laminorul Roman	23	(0)
2001–2004	FCM Bacău	85	(2)
2004–2010	Steaua București	87	(1)
2010–2011	Steaua II București		
2011–2012	FCM Bacău	20	(0)
Total		215	(3)

International career
2002	Romania	1	(0)
- * Club domestic league appearances and goals as of 22 May 2010

Eugen Cătălin Baciu (born 25 May 1980 in Vaslui) is a Romanian football player.

== Club career ==
Baciu made his Divizia A debut in the FCM Bacău on 12 May 2001 with the 2–0 defeat of Gloria Bistriţa.

He played for Laminorul Roman and FCM Bacău.

Prior to joining Steaua București as a replacement for the injured Mirel Rădoi in 2004, signed for a fee of €230,000, not as a first team regular.

He had his best game on 2 October 2007, in Steaua București's 0–1 defeat against Arsenal in the Champions League; where he was voted the best player on the pitch for Steaua București in that match, when he somehow managed to make a very good marking at Emmanuel Adebayor.

In the beginning of 2010–11 season, Baciu was demoted to the B squad after the arrival of new coach Victor Piţurcă. Soon after Piţurcă left the club, new coach Dumitrescu called him back to the first squad.

Baciu left Steaua in June 2011.

== International career ==
Baciu won a cap for Romania, in 2002, against Poland.

== Titles ==
Season	Club	Title
2004–05	Steaua București	Divizia A
2005–06	Steaua București	Divizia A
2005–06	Steaua București	Supercupa României
