= Octavian Abrudan =

Romanian footballer

Personal information
- Date of birth: 16 March 1984 (age 42)
- Place of birth: Cluj-Napoca, Romania
- Height: 1.91 m (6 ft 3 in)
- Position: Centre back

Senior career*
Years	Team	Apps	(Gls)
1999–2005	Universitatea Cluj	67	(1)
2005–2008	Gloria Bistrița	62	(3)
2008–2010	Brașov	52	(6)
2010	Steaua București	7	(0)
2011–2012	Universitatea Cluj	29	(0)
2012–2013	Rapid București	20	(0)
2013–2014	Universitatea Cluj	26	(2)
2014	Milsami Orhei	6	(0)
2015–2016	Gaz Metan Mediaș	22	(3)
2016–2019	Universitatea Cluj	76	(4)
Total		367	(19)
- * Club domestic league appearances and goals as of 30 June 2019

Octavian "Tavi" Abrudan (born 16 March 1984) is a Romanian former footballer who played as a centre-back for teams, such as Universitatea Cluj, Gloria Bistrița, FC Brașov or Rapid București, among others.

== Personal life ==
Octavian is the son of a former international assistant referee, international match observer and currently Regional manager of Banca Transilvania, Patrițiu Abrudan.

== Honours ==
Universitatea Cluj

- Liga III: 2000–01, 2017–18
- Liga IV – Cluj County: 2016–17

Gloria Bistrița

- UEFA Intertoto Cup: Runner-up 2007

FC Brașov

- Liga II: 2007–08

Steaua București

- Cupa României: 2010–11

Milsami Orhei

- Moldovan National Division: 2014–15

Gaz Metan Mediaș

- Liga II: 2015–16
