= Alex Leandro =

Brazilian footballer (born 1984)

Personal information
- Full name: Alex Leandro Souza Santos
- Date of birth: 28 August 1984 (age 42)
- Place of birth: São Paulo, Brazil
- Height: 1.77 m (5 ft 10 in)
- Position: Striker

Youth career
- São Paulo

Senior career*
Years	Team	Apps	(Gls)
2003–2006	Sion	32	(7)
2005	→ Bulle (loan)	14	(0)
2006	→ Unirea Urziceni (loan)	10	(1)
2007–2008	Iraklis	0	(0)
2007–2008	→ Haidari (loan)	3	(0)
2008	Dinamo II București		
2009	Săgeata Stejaru	1	(0)
2011	Phoenix Ulmu		
2012–2013	Avântul Măneciu		
Total		60	(8)
- * Club domestic league appearances and goals

Alex Leandro Souza Santos (born 28 August 1984), known simply as Alex Leandro, is a Brazilian former footballer who played as a striker. His brother-in-law, Ricardo Vilana was also a footballer, they played together at Unirea Urziceni.

== Honours ==
Sion

- Swiss Cup: 2005–06
