= Iulian Apostol =

Romanian footballer

Personal information
- Full name: Iulian Catalin Apostol
- Date of birth: 3 December 1980 (age 45)
- Place of birth: Galați, Romania
- Height: 1.74 m (5 ft 9 in)
- Position: Central midfielder

Senior career*
Years	Team	Apps	(Gls)
1996–2000	Dunărea Galați	51	(0)
2000–2002	Metalul Plopeni	22	(2)
2002–2003	Gloria Buzău	19	(1)
2003–2004	Oţelul Galați	20	(2)
2004–2007	Farul Constanţa	55	(6)
2006	→ Oțelul Galați (loan)	10	(0)
2007–2010	Unirea Urziceni	66	(6)
2010	Steaua București	5	(0)
2011	Unirea Urziceni	11	(1)
2011–2012	Rapid București	10	(0)
2012–2013	Dunărea Galați	8	(2)
Total		277	(20)

International career^{‡}
2009–2011	Romania	7	(1)
- * Club domestic league appearances and goals as of 24 December 2015 ‡ National team caps and goals as of 24 December 2015

Iulian Cătălin Apostol (born 3 December 1980 in Galaţi) is a former Romanian footballer.

== Club career ==
On 31 August 2010 he signed a contract with Steaua București alongside teammates from Unirea Urziceni: Galamaz, Ricardo, Marinescu, Bilaşco, Onofraş and next week Brandán.

After only three months, Apostol terminated his contract with Steaua.

=== International goals ===
#	Date	Venue	Opponent	Score	Result	Competition
1	13 October 2009	Ceahlăul Stadium, Piatra Neamţ, Romania	Faroe Islands	1–0	3–1	2010 FIFA World Cup qualification

== Titles ==
Season	Club	Title
2008–09	Unirea Urziceni	Liga I
