= Ștefan Bărboianu =

Romanian footballer

Personal information
- Full name: Ștefan Nicolae Bărboianu
- Date of birth: 24 January 1988 (age 38)
- Place of birth: Craiova, Romania
- Height: 1.82 m (6 ft 0 in)
- Positions: Right back; defensive midfielder

Team information
- Current team: CS Drobeta-Turnu Severin (assistant)

Youth career
- –2005: Școala de Fotbal Gheorghe Popescu

Senior career*
| Years | Team | Apps | (Gls) |
| 2006–2010 | Universitatea Craiova | 87 | (2) |
| 2011 | Dinamo București | 9 | (0) |
| 2011–2013 | Astra Giurgiu | 37 | (1) |
| 2014–2015 | Dinamo București | 37 | (2) |
| 2015–2019 | Concordia Chiajna | 80 | (0) |
| 2019–2020 | Petrolul Ploiești | 23 | (0) |
| 2020 | Turris Turnu Măgurele | 7 | (0) |
| 2021 | Petrolul Ploiești | 3 | (0) |
| 2021–2026 | CSM Reșița | 57 | (5) |
| Total | | 340 | (10) |

International career
| 2006 | Romania U19 | 2 | (0) |
| 2009–2010 | Romania U21 | 15 | (0) |

Managerial career
- 2022–2026: CSM Reșița (player/assistant)
- 2023: CSM Reșița (caretaker)
- 2026: Farul Constanța (assistant)
- 2026–: CS Drobeta-Turnu Severin (assistant)
- * Club domestic league appearances and goals

Ștefan Nicolae Bărboianu (born 24 January 1988) is a Romanian former professional footballer who played as a right back or a defensive midfielder, currently assistant coach at Liga III club CS Drobeta-Turnu Severin.

== Club career ==
=== Universitatea Craiova ===
Bărboianu started his career at Universitatea Craiova. In February 2011 he was declared free agent, but in the meantime he signed a new contract with Craiova, from 1 July 2011. So Bărboianu played in the Spring of 2011 for Dinamo București, and returned to Craiova in July. Following the disaffiliation of Universitatea, Bărboianu was again declared free agent and signed on 3 August 2011 a contract for five years with Astra Giurgiu.

=== Dinamo București ===
Bărboianu had two terms at Dinamo. The first one was a short one, for only four months, from February until May 2011. He was released after an own-goal in the 2011 Cupa României Final, that sent the trophy to Dinamo's biggest rivals, Steaua București. In December 2013, Bărboianu returned to Dinamo and played until May 2015, when in a match again versus Steaua, he conceded a penalty which led to the first goal of the game, won by Steaua 3–1. Two days after the game, his contract with Dinamo was ended by mutual agreement.

== Honours ==
Universitatea Craiova

- Divizia B: 2005–06

Dinamo București

- Cupa României runner-up: 2010–11

Concordia Chiajna

- Cupa Ligii runner-up: 2015–16

CSM Reșița

- Liga III: 2021–22, 2022–23
