= Claudiu Ionescu =

Claudiu Ionescu may refer to:

- Claudiu Ionescu (footballer, born 1984), Romanian football player currently playing for Muscelul Câmpulung
- Claudiu Eugen Ionescu (born 1959), Romanian handball player who competed in the 1980 Summer Olympics
- Claudiu Mircea Ionescu (born 1983), Romanian football player currently playing for Montana Pătârlagele
