= Alexandru Păcurar =

Romanian footballer

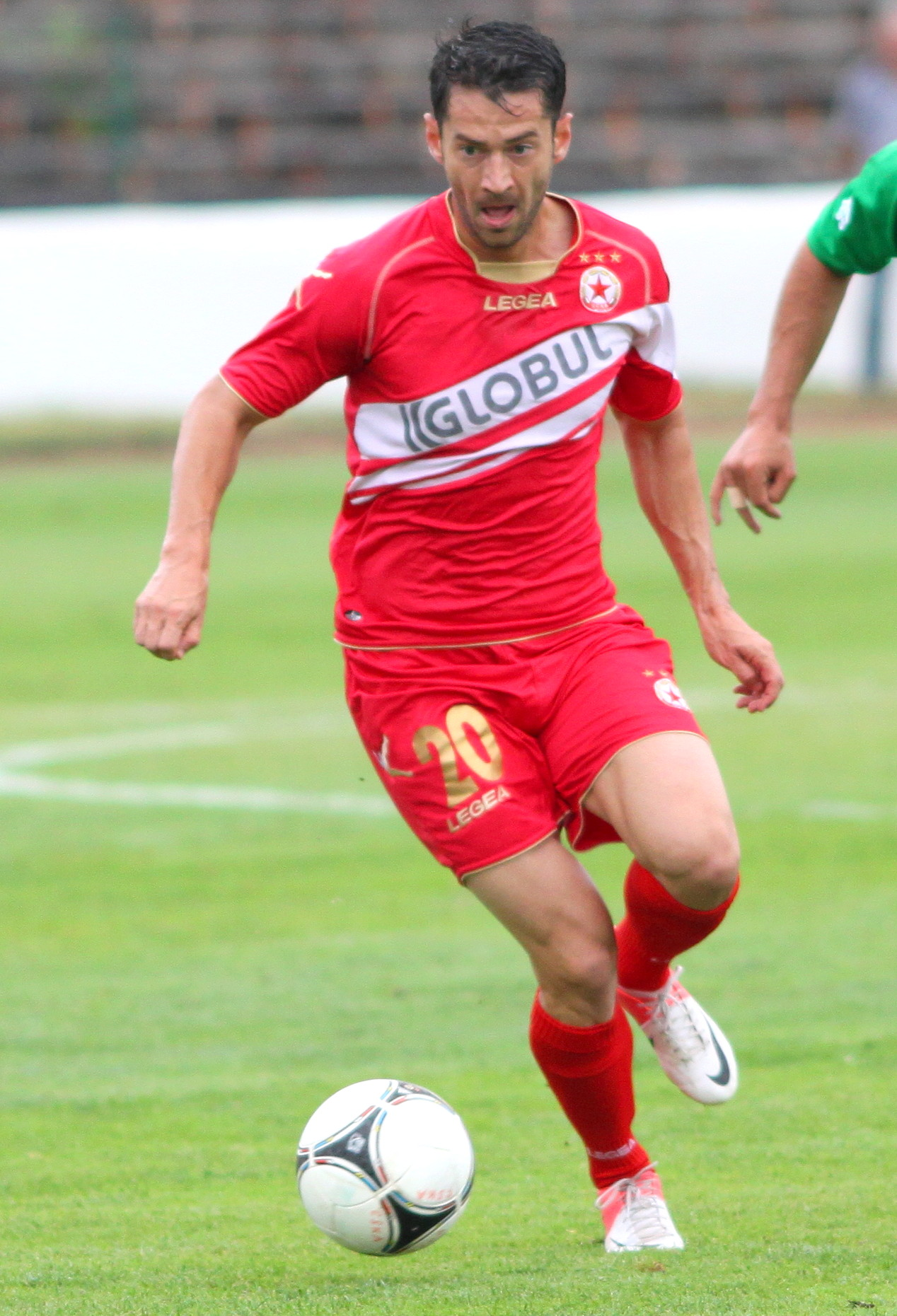

Personal information
- Full name: Alexandru Păcurar
- Date of birth: 20 January 1982 (age 44)
- Place of birth: Cluj-Napoca, Romania
- Height: 1.76 m (5 ft 9 in)
- Position: Attacking midfielder

Senior career*
Years	Team	Apps	(Gls)
2003–2004	Universitatea Cluj	11	(0)
2004–2006	Dinamo București	14	(1)
2004–2006	Dinamo II București	12	(5)
2005–2006	→ Gloria Bistriţa (loan)	26	(3)
2006	Gloria Bistriţa	10	(1)
2007–2010	Pandurii Târgu Jiu	70	(16)
2010	Steaua București	6	(1)
2010–2012	Universitatea Cluj	48	(5)
2012	CSKA Sofia	5	(0)
2016–2017	Universitatea Cluj	2	(2)
- * Club domestic league appearances and goals as of 17 July 2017

Alexandru Păcurar (born 20 January 1982) is a Romanian professional football player.

== Career ==
=== Steaua București ===
On 25 July 2010 he makes dream debut for Steaua in Liga I against Universitatea Cluj. On 29 August he scored his first goal for Steaua in the 1–1 home match against FC Timişoara. On the next day, the club chairman George Becali announced, that he was sold due to bad discipline. Păcurar spent only 2 months in Steaua and was sold to Universitatea Cluj.

=== PFC CSKA Sofia ===
On 27 July 2012 Alex signed a 3-year contract with PFC CSKA Sofia. Păcurar made his official debut for CSKA in 3–0 home win against Botev Vratsa.
