= Alexandru Ologu =

Romanian footballer

Personal information
- Full name: Marius Alexandru Ologu
- Date of birth: 16 July 1989 (age 37)
- Place of birth: Craiova, Romania
- Height: 1.80 m (5 ft 11 in)
- Position: Midfielder

Team information
- Current team: Lye Town

Youth career
- –2008: Universitatea Craiova

Senior career*
| Years | Team | Apps | (Gls) |
| 2008–2011 | Universitatea Craiova | 20 | (0) |
| 2011–2012 | Astra Ploiești | 7 | (0) |
| 2012 | CS Turnu Severin | 3 | (0) |
| 2013 | Săgeata Năvodari | 9 | (3) |
| 2013 | Olt Slatina | ? | (?) |
| 2014 | ASA Târgu Mureș | 7 | (0) |
| 2014 | Caransebeș | 10 | (1) |
| 2015 | Național Sebiș | ? | (?) |
| 2015–2016 | Dudley Town | ? | (?) |
| 2016–2019 | Worcester City | 7 | (0) |
| 2019– | Lye Town | ? | (?) |
- * Club domestic league appearances and goals

Marius Alexandru Ologu (born 16 July 1989) is a Romanian footballer who plays as a midfielder for Lye Town.
