= George Galamaz =

Romanian footballer

Personal information
- Full name: George Daniel Galamaz
- Date of birth: 5 April 1981 (age 45)
- Place of birth: Bucharest, Romania
- Height: 1.88 m (6 ft 2 in)
- Position: Centre-back

Team information
- Current team: CFR Cluj (head of youth development)

Youth career
- –1998: Sportul Studențesc

Senior career*
| Years | Team | Apps | (Gls) |
| 1998–2003 | Sportul Studențesc | 98 | (4) |
| 2004 | Rapid București | 11 | (1) |
| 2004–2006 | Dinamo București | 41 | (0) |
| 2007–2010 | Unirea Urziceni | 113 | (11) |
| 2010–2011 | Steaua București | 19 | (0) |
| 2012 | Universitatea Cluj | 13 | (0) |
| 2012 | Petrolul Ploiești | 16 | (0) |
| 2013–2014 | Anorthosis Famagusta | 11 | (0) |
| Total | | 322 | (16) |

International career
| 2001–2003 | Romania U21 | 7 | (0) |
| 2009–2011 | Romania | 4 | (0) |

Managerial career
- 2014: FC Caransebeș (president)
- 2015–2018: Voluntari (sporting director)
- 2019–2021: Farul Constanța (team manager)
- 2022–: CFR Cluj (head of youth development)
- * Club domestic league appearances and goals

George Daniel Galamaz (born 5 April 1981) is a Romanian former professional footballer who played as a centre-back, currently head of youth development at Liga I club CFR Cluj.

== Club career ==
Galamaz played for Unirea Urziceni. On 31 August 2010, he signed a contract with Steaua București, together with his former teammates from Ricardo, Marinescu, Apostol, Bilaşco and Onofraş: the following week, Brandán also signed.

On 30 October 2011, a Romanian football spectator hit Galamaz after running past security on to the pitch during an away game with Petrolul Ploiești. Galamaz was later diagnosed with a broken right cheekbone.

== Career statistics ==
Appearances and goals by national team and year
| National team | Year | Apps | Goals |
|---|---|---|---|
| Romania | 2009 | 1 | 0 |
| Romania | 2010 | 2 | 0 |
| Romania | 2011 | 1 | 0 |
| Total | | 4 | 0 |

== Honours ==
Sportul Studențesc

- Divizia B: 2000–01

Dinamo București

- Cupa României: 2004–05
- Supercupa României: 2005

Unirea Urziceni

- Liga I: 2008–09
- Cupa României runner-up: 2007–08
- Supercupa României runner-up: 2009, 2010

Steaua București

- Cupa României: 2010–11
