= Éder Bonfim =

Brazilian footballer

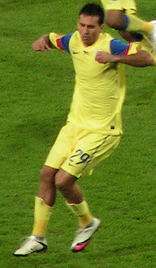
- Bonfim in action for Steaua

Personal information
- Full name: Éder José de Oliveira Bonfim
- Date of birth: 3 April 1981 (age 45)
- Place of birth: Mineiros, Brazil
- Height: 1.87 m (6 ft 2 in)
- Position: Right back

Senior career*
Years	Team	Apps	(Gls)
2000–2002	Grêmio Inhumense	18	(4)
2002	→ Benfica (loan)	7	(0)
2003	→ Estrela Amadora (loan)	15	(1)
2003–2004	→ Braga (loan)	27	(0)
2004–2005	→ Vitória Setúbal (loan)	25	(0)
2005–2008	União Leiria	75	(4)
2008–2010	Politehnica Timişoara	34	(0)
2009	→ Gloria Buzău (loan)	9	(0)
2010–2011	Steaua București	19	(0)
2011–2013	Khazar	48	(5)
Total		277	(14)
- * Club domestic league appearances and goals

Éder José de Oliveira Bonfim (born 3 April 1981) is a retired Brazilian professional footballer who played as a right back.

== Football career ==
=== Early years / Portugal ===
Born in Mineiros, Goiás, Bonfim started professionally with Grêmio Esportivo Inhumense. In January 2002 he signed a five-year contract but, after just five games for the first team, he was successively loaned to Portuguese clubs: S.L. Benfica, C.F. Estrela da Amadora, S.C. Braga and Vitória de Setúbal.

In 2005, Éder joined another Primeira Liga side, U.D. Leiria, being first-choice for the duration of his spell.

=== Romania ===
In the summer of 2008, Bonfim signed with FC Timişoara. In January of the following year, he had a brief loan spell with fellow Liga I team FC Gloria Buzău; upon his return, he became a first-team regular.

Subsequently, Éder moved to country giants FC Steaua București. On 16 August 2010 he made his league debut for the capital side, against FC Victoria Brăneşti.

On 4 May 2011, Éder terminated contract with Steaua by mutual agreement. He left his following club, FK Khazar Lankaran in Azerbaijan, on 26 July 2013, following a 0–8 home defeat to Maccabi Haifa F.C. for the season's UEFA Europa League.

== Honours ==
Vitória Setúbal

- Taça de Portugal: 2004–05

Steaua București

- Cupa României: 2010–11
