= Raul Marincău =

Romanian footballer

Personal information
- Full name: Raul Paul Marincău
- Date of birth: 27 April 1981 (age 45)
- Place of birth: Deva, Romania
- Height: 1.96 m (6 ft 5 in)
- Position: Defender

Youth career
- LPS Hunedoara

Senior career*
Years	Team	Apps	(Gls)
1997–1998	Jiul Petroșani	10	(0)
1999–2001	Corvinul Hunedoara	55	(4)
2002–2003	Uralan Elista	0	(0)
2002	→ Uralan-d Elista	25	(1)
2003	→ Argeș Pitești (loan)	13	(2)
2004–2007	Argeș Pitești	42	(1)
2007	→ FCM Reșița (loan)	13	(3)
2008	UTA Arad	7	(1)
2008–2009	Universitatea Cluj	20	(0)
2009–2010	Gloria Buzău	18	(4)
2010–2011	Victoria Brănești	34	(3)
2012–2013	Delta Tulcea	26	(2)
2013–2014	Olt Slatina	18	(0)
2014–2015	SCM Pitești		
- * Club domestic league appearances and goals

Raul Paul Marincău (born 27 April 1981) is a Romanian former footballer who played as a defender.

== Career ==
Marincău has spent most of his playing career in Romania at clubs such as: Jiul Petroșani, Corvinul Hunedoara, Argeș Pitești, UTA Arad or Universitatea Cluj. He made his Liga I debut on 6 December 1997 for Jiul Petroșani, in a 4–0 defeat against Universitatea Cluj. He also had a spell with Russian Premier League side Uralan Elista during 2002 and 2003. He only made one Russian Cup appearance for the senior side before leaving the club.
