= Vladimir Niculescu =

Romanian footballer

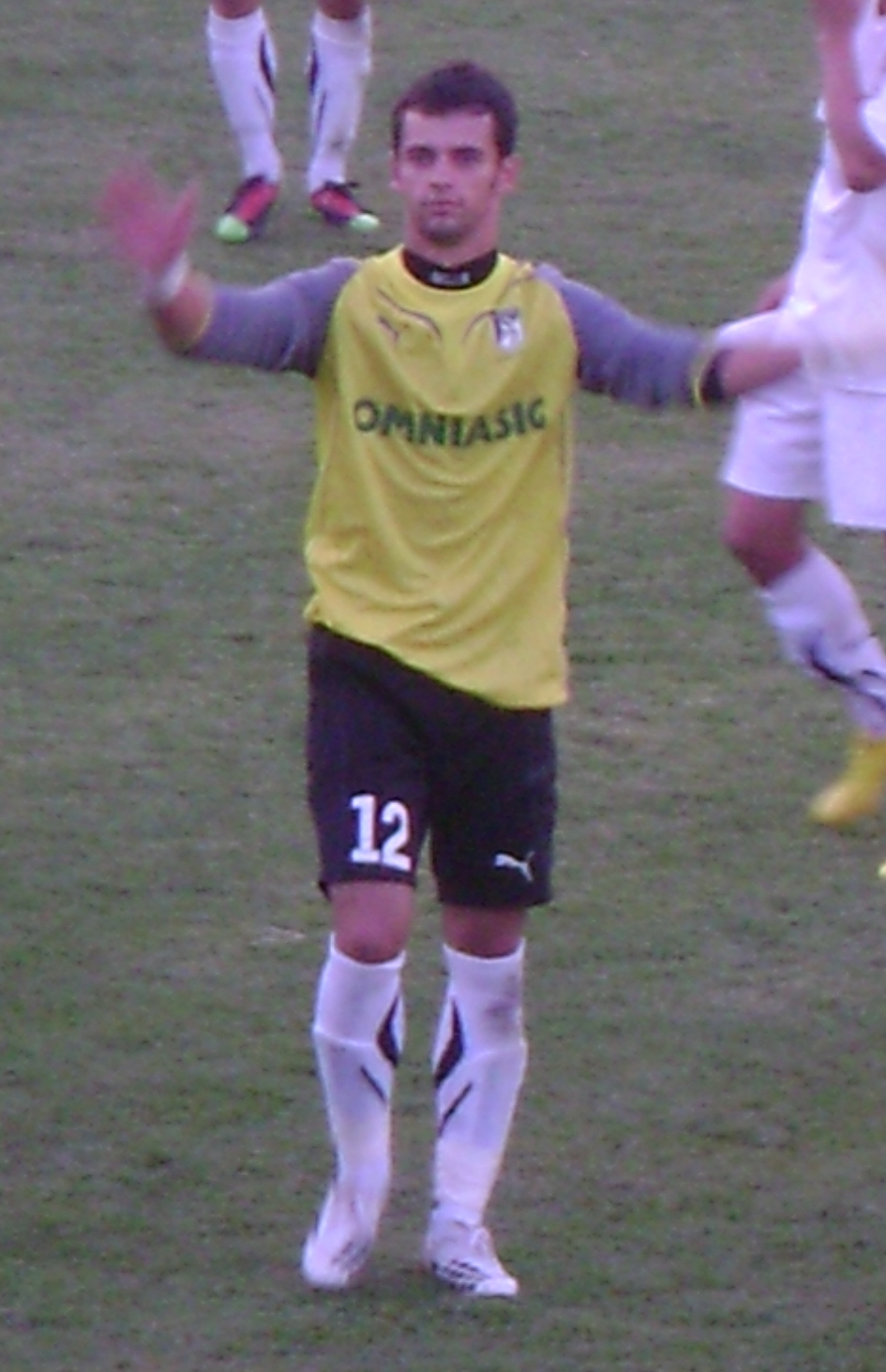

Personal information
- Full name: Vladimir George Niculescu
- Date of birth: 26 September 1987 (age 39)
- Place of birth: Bucharest, Romania
- Height: 1.82 m (5 ft 11 1/2 in)
- Position: Goalkeeper

Senior career*
Years	Team	Apps	(Gls)
2006–2012	Sportul Studențesc	54	(0)
2012	Gloria Bistrița	0	(0)
2012	Damila Măciuca	1	(0)
2013–2014	Universitatea Cluj	17	(0)
- * Club domestic league appearances and goals as of 10 December 2014

Vladimir Niculescu (born 26 September 1987, Bucharest) is a Romanian professional football player, who plays as a goalkeeper. He is a free agent.

== Career ==
Niculescu started his career in 2006, at Sportul Studențesc. Four years later he promoted with his team and on 20 August 2010, Niculescu made his Liga I debut in a match against CFR Cluj.

At the beginning of 2012, Niculescu moved to the transylvanian team Gloria Bistrița. Later that year he was transferred to Damila Măciuca for whom he played only one match. In November 2012 Niculescu terminated the contract with Damila Măciuca by mutual agreement, the reason beyng his desire to play and not to be a reserve.

In April 2013 was brought at Universitatea Cluj by the manager of the team at that time, Ioan Viorel Ganea, and made the debut for his new team on 5 April 2013 in a victory against Astra Ploiești.
