= Raúl Martín (footballer, born 1979) =

Spanish footballer

Personal information
- Full name: Raúl Martín Rodríguez
- Date of birth: 16 August 1979 (age 47)
- Place of birth: Seville, Spain
- Height: 1.81 m (5 ft 11 1/2 in)
- Position: Midfielder

Senior career*
Years	Team	Apps	(Gls)
1998–1999	Manchego	28	(1)
1999–2001	Cádiz	37	(3)
2001–2002	Motril	37	(8)
2002–2003	Mallorca B	30	(4)
2003–2004	Mallorca	8	(0)
2004	→ Tenerife (loan)	20	(2)
2004–2005	Tenerife	33	(2)
2005–2008	Elche	73	(7)
2008–2009	Girona	26	(2)
2009–2010	Ceuta	32	(7)
2010–2011	Novelda	13	(3)
Total		337	(39)
- * Club domestic league appearances and goals

Raúl Martín Rodríguez (born 16 August 1979) is a Spanish former professional footballer who played as a right midfielder.

He amassed Segunda División totals of 152 games and 13 goals over six seasons, with Tenerife, Elche and Girona.

== Club career ==
Born in Seville, Andalusia, Martín began his career with CD Manchego in Segunda División B, making his debut on 30 August 1998 and scoring the opening goal of a 2–0 win over Sevilla Atlético, his only in 28 games that season. He continued competing in that level in the following years, with Cádiz CF, Motril CF and RCD Mallorca's reserves.

With the first team of the latter club, Martín appeared in 13 competitive matches during his two-year stint. His La Liga debut occurred on 5 January 2003 when he came on as 66th-minute substitute for Albert Riera in a 0–1 away loss against Sevilla FC, and on 27 November of that year he started in a 1–1 home draw to FC Copenhagen in the UEFA Cup.

Late into the 2004 January transfer window, Martín was loaned to Segunda División side CD Tenerife, and on 6 August he signed a permanent two-year deal with the option of a third. His first goal as a professional arrived on 22 February 2004, the only one in a home win over Córdoba CF.

On 10 July 2005, after terminating his contract, Martín joined fellow league club Elche CF. Still in that tier, he later represented Girona FC; a few months after agreeing to a two-year deal with the latter, he attested against the former due to delayed payments.

Martín retired from professional football at the age of 30, but still spent a further two campaigns in the lower leagues with AD Ceuta and Novelda CF.
