= Claudiu Moisie =

Romanian footballer

Personal information
- Full name: Claudiu Constantin Moisie
- Date of birth: 13 May 2000 (age 26)
- Place of birth: Pitești, Romania
- Height: 1.89 m (6 ft 2 in)
- Position: Centre back

Youth career
- –2012: LPS Pitești
- 2012–2019: Școala de Fotbal Dănuț Coman
- 2014–2015: → Academica Argeș (loan)
- 2016–2017: → SCM Pitești (loan)

Senior career*
Years	Team	Apps	(Gls)
2019–2021	Star Sport Argeș	0	(0)
2019–2020	→ Turris Turnu Măgurele (loan)	1	(0)
2020–2021	→ Pandurii Targu Jiu (loan)	21	(0)
2021–2023	Argeș Pitești	5	(0)
2022	→ Metaloglobus București (loan)	5	(0)
2023–2024	Viitorul Târgu Jiu	26	(2)
2025	CSM Slatina	2	(1)
- * Club domestic league appearances and goals as of 15 March 2025

Claudiu Constantin Moisie (born 13 May 2000) is a Romanian professional footballer who plays as a centre back.

== Club career ==
=== Argeș Pitești ===
He made his Liga I debut for Argeș Pitești against Rapid București on 7 August 2021.
