= Pablo Brandán =

Argentine footballer and manager

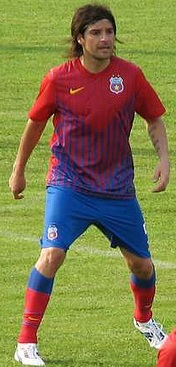
- Brandán playing for Steaua București in 2011

Personal information
- Full name: Pablo Daniel Brandán
- Date of birth: 5 March 1983 (age 43)
- Place of birth: Merlo, Argentina
- Height: 1.81 m (5 ft 11 in)
- Positions: Defensive midfielder; left-back

Youth career
- –1998: Huracán

Senior career*
Years	Team	Apps	(Gls)
1998–2000	Huracán	25	(3)
2001–2003	Alavés	2	(0)
2002	→ Burgos (loan)	10	(1)
2003	→ Independiente (loan)	6	(0)
2004–2005	Argentinos Juniors	13	(0)
2005–2006	Instituto	24	(2)
2006–2007	Alavés	18	(0)
2007–2010	Unirea Urziceni	73	(4)
2010–2012	Steaua București	43	(0)
2012–2014	Liaoning Whowin	48	(1)
2014	Beitar Jerusalem	14	(1)
2014–2015	Universitatea Craiova	22	(4)
2015–2016	ASA Târgu Mureş	34	(3)
2016	Viitorul Constanța	14	(0)
2017–2018	Fénix	3	(0)
Total		349	(19)

International career
1999–2000	Argentina U20	8	(3)

Managerial career
- 2018–2020: Fénix (sporting director)
- 2018: Fénix (caretaker)
- 2020–2024: Fénix (technical director)
- 2021: Fénix (caretaker)
- * Club domestic league appearances and goals

Pablo Daniel Brandán (Spanish pronunciation: [ˈpaβlo βɾanˈdan]; (Note: In isolation, Brandán is pronounced [bɾanˈdan].) born 5 March 1983) is an Argentine former professional footballer who played as a defensive midfielder or a left-back.

== Career ==
Brandán was born in Merlo. He won the 2008–09 Liga I edition with Unirea Urziceni, under the coaching of Dan Petrescu. In the same season he was selected the Liga I left back of the year.

In September 2010 he signed a contract with Steaua București before follow teammates from Unirea Urziceni: Galamaz, Ricardo, Marinescu, Apostol and Bilașco who signed one week earlier. He was part of the team which played in the 2009–10 UEFA Champions League group stage.

In the 2011–12 Liga I season, Brandán began being used as a central midfielder and central defender, although his main post is on the left flank of the defence. Brandán proved to be a playmaker, giving 3 goal assists in the season and 4 assists in the 2011–12 UEFA Europa League, but did not manage to score his first goal for Steaua.

In February 2012, he was transferred to Chinese team Liaoning Whowin.

In January 2014, he signed a contract with Beitar Jerusalem in which he scored 1 goal in 14 league appearances. He then moved back to Romania where he won the Romanian championship once again in 2016–17 with FC Viitorul Constanța.

== Honours ==
Huracán

- Primera B Nacional: 1999–00

Alavés

- UEFA Cup runner-up: 2000–01

Independiente

- Primera División: 2002 Apertura

Unirea Urziceni

- Liga I: 2008–09
- Cupa României runner-up: 2007–08
- Supercupa României runner-up: 2009, 2010

Steaua București

- Cupa României: 2010–11
- Supercupa României runner-up: 2011

ASA Târgu Mureș

- Supercupa României: 2015

Individual

- Gazeta Sporturilor Foreign Player of the Year in Romania: 2009
