= Romeo Surdu =

Romanian footballer and manager

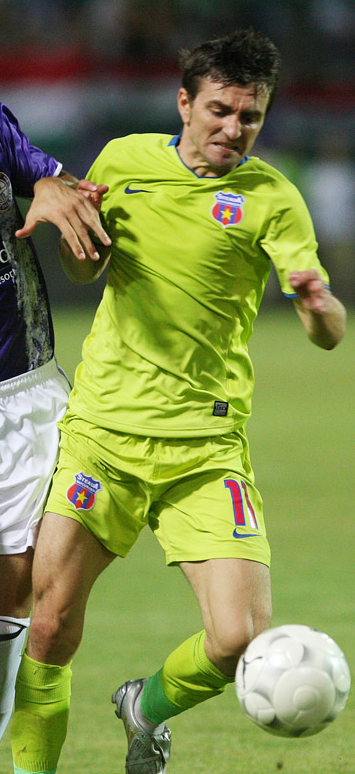
- Surdu playing for Steaua in 2009

Personal information
- Full name: Romeo Constantin Surdu
- Date of birth: 12 January 1984 (age 42)
- Place of birth: Brașov, Romania
- Height: 1.76 m (5 ft 9 in)
- Positions: Winger; forward

Senior career*
Years	Team	Apps	(Gls)
2001–2005	Brașov	66	(18)
2005–2007	CFR Cluj	51	(16)
2007–2011	FCSB	65	(9)
2008–2009	→ Brașov (loan)	21	(8)
2011–2012	Rapid București	37	(5)
2013	Apollon Limassol	16	(3)
2013–2014	Brașov	23	(4)
2014–2016	Milsami Orhei	42	(16)
2016–2017	Târgu Mureș	13	(0)
2017	RWD Molenbeek	6	(4)
2017–2018	Milsami Orhei	35	(3)
2019	Farul Constanța	10	(1)
2019–2020	SR Brașov	2	(2)
2020	Olimpic Cetate Râșnov	1	(0)
Total		388	(85)

International career
2003	Romania U19	3	(0)
2004–2006	Romania U21	11	(1)
2009–2011	Romania	6	(0)

Managerial career
- 2019–2020: SR Brașov (assistant)
- 2020: Milsami Orhei
- 2020: Olimpic Cetate Râșnov
- 2021: FC Brașov (assistant)
- * Club domestic league appearances and goals

Romeo Constantin Surdu (born 12 January 1984) is a Romanian footballer and manager.

== Club career ==
Born in Brașov, Surdu began his football career at FC Brașov. During the summer of 2005 he was traded to CFR Cluj.

=== Steaua ===
On 22 August 2007, he signed a four-year contract with Steaua București. On 2 September 2007 played his first match in Steaua's shirt against Unirea Urziceni. In the first season with the team he didn't make a direct impact, playing just 12 league games for the Bucharest team.

==== Loan to FC Braşov ====
For the 2008–09 season he was loaned to his former club FC Brașov where he had a fantastic season. He scored 8 goals, helping FC Brașov finish 1 point from qualifying for UEFA Europa League.

==== Return to Steaua ====
In the summer of 2009 he returned to Steaua București. Surdu scored the first goal in Steaua's shirt against Újpest in the second qualifying round of Europa League, on 16 July 2009. He scored his first goal for Steaua in Liga I in a draw against his former team CFR Cluj, after an assist by Bogdan Stancu. He scored on 23 August 2009 the only goal in Steaua's victory against Oțelul Galați. In the second year with the team he won a place in the starting 11 and played with Steaua București in the UEFA Europa League.

In the second round, he scored the victory goal for Steaua against FC U Craiova. Steaua won home with 2–1. In the fifth round, he scored his first brace at Steaua against FC Vaslui, first goal in 5th minute and the last goal in the 55th minute, Steaua winning away with 3–0.

In June 2011, Surdu left Steaua.

=== Rapid ===
On 5 June 2011, Surdu signed a two-year contract with Rapid Bucharest. He made his debut on July in a 3–0 win over FC Vaslui scoring the second goal of the game. He ended his contract by mutual agreement in December 2012, after the club was placed under administration.

=== Apollon Limassol ===
In January 2013, Surdu signed a contract for 18 months with Apollon Limassol, in the Cypriot First Division.

==== FC Braşov ====
On 5 September 2013, Surdu returns to Brașov and he signed a contract for one year.

==== Milsami Orhei ====
In July 2014, he moved to FC Milsami Orhei, in the Republic of Moldova.

== International career ==
Surdu played as a youth for the Romania U-19, as well as the Romania U-21.

In August 2009 he was call-up by the Răzvan Lucescu in the Romanian against Hungary. He made his debut for Romania on 12 August 2009 against Hungary, coming on in the 46th minute to replace Ionel Dănciulescu. He has since the played six games for the national side.

== Coaching career ==
On 14 February 2020 it was confirmed, that Surdu had returned to FC Milsami Orhei in his first experience as head coach. However, Surdu decided to resign two weeks later, on 3 March 2020. Surdu later explained, that he coached the team without signing a contract with the club. After two weeks, they were about to sign a contract but didn't agree on the duration of the deal, which led him to leave the club.

== Playing statistics ==
=== Club ===
Appearances and goals by club, season and competition
Club	Season	League		Cup		Europe		Total	
Club	Season	Apps	Goals	Apps	Goals	Apps	Goals	Apps	Goals
FC Brașov	2001–02	3	0	0	0	0	0	3	0
FC Brașov	2002–03	11	1	0	0	0	0	11	1
FC Brașov	2003–04	24	8	1	0	0	0	25	8
FC Brașov	2004–05	28	9	1	0	0	0	29	9
FC Brașov	Total	66	18	2	0	0	0	68	18
CFR Cluj	2005–06	22	6	1	0	0	0	23	6
CFR Cluj	2006–07	29	10	1	0	0	0	30	10
CFR Cluj	Total	51	16	2	0	0	0	53	16
Steaua București	2007–08	12	0	2	0	0	0	14	0
Steaua București	2009–10	32	5	1	0	10	1	43	6
Steaua București	2010–11	21	4	5	1	8	0	34	5
Steaua București	Total	65	9	8	1	18	1	91	11
FC Brașov (loan)	2008–09	21	8	0	0	0	0	21	8
Rapid București	2011–12	28	5	5	0	4	0	37	5
Rapid București	2012–13	9	0	1	0	4	1	14	1
Rapid București	Total	37	5	6	0	8	1	51	6
Apollon Limassol	2012–13	10	0	6	3	0	0	16	3
FC Brașov	2013–14	24	4	2	1	0	0	26	5
Milsami Orhei	2014–15	23	11	0	0	0	0	23	11
Milsami Orhei	2015–16	19	4	0	0	1	0	19	4
Milsami Orhei	Total	42	15	0	0	1	0	43	15
Career total		316	75	26	5	27	2	369	82

== Honours ==
Steaua București

- Romanian Cup: 2010–11

Apollon Limassol

- Cypriot Cup: 2012–13

Milsami Orhei

- Moldovan National Division: 2014–15
- Moldovan Cup: 2017–18
