= Cristian Irimia =

Retired Romanian footballer

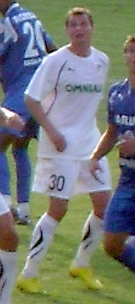

Personal information
- Date of birth: 16 July 1981 (age 45)
- Place of birth: Bucharest, Romania
- Height: 1.81 m (5 ft 11 in)
- Position: Right full back

Team information
- Current team: Valea Iașului

Senior career*
Years	Team	Apps	(Gls)
1999–2003	Sportul Studențesc	116	(13)
2003–2004	Rapid București	10	(0)
2004–2005	Dinamo București	11	(0)
2005–2006	Dynamo Kyiv	4	(0)
2006	→ Dynamo-2 Kyiv	6	(0)
2006–2012	Sportul Studențesc	110	(7)
2013–2015	Voluntari		
2016–2019	Basarabi Curtea de Argeș	52	(5)
2019	→ Real Bradu (loan)	11	(0)
2019–2021	Voința Budeasa	21	(1)
2021	→ Gloria Berevoiești (loan)	5	(1)
2021–2022	Inter Câmpulung	22	(8)
2022–	Valea Iașului	25	(2)

International career^{‡}
2003	Romania U–21	2	(0)
- * Club domestic league appearances and goals as of 00:24, 14 January 2024 (UTC) ‡ National team caps and goals as of 10 June 2003

Cristian Irimia (born 16 July 1981) is a Romanian footballer who plays as a midfielder for Liga IV side Internațional Valea Iașului. In his career, Irimia also played for teams such as Sportul Studențesc, Rapid București, Dinamo București, Dynamo Kyiv and FC Voluntari.
