= Claudiu Bunea =

Romanian footballer

Personal information
- Full name: Claudiu Emil Bunea
- Date of birth: 28 December 1981 (age 44)
- Place of birth: Mediaș, Romania
- Height: 1.75 m (5 ft 9 in)
- Position: Defensive midfielder

Senior career*
Years	Team	Apps	(Gls)
2001–2004	Gaz Metan Mediaș	32	(3)
2004–2005	Mureșul Deva	10	(0)
2006–2007	Sparta Mediaș		
2009–2010	Zlatna		
2010–2012	Voința Sibiu	56	(2)
2012–2013	Târgu Mureș	3	(0)
Total		101	(5)
- * Club domestic league appearances and goals

Claudiu Emil Bunea (born 28 December 1981) is a Romanian former footballer who played as a midfielder for teams such as: Gaz Metan Mediaș, CSU Voința Sibiu or ASA 2013 Târgu Mureș, among others.
