= Marius Bilașco =

Romanian footballer (born 1981)

Personal information
- Full name: Marius Ioan Bilașco
- Date of birth: 13 July 1981 (age 45)
- Place of birth: Sighetu Marmaţiei, Romania
- Height: 1.84 m (6 ft 0 in)
- Position: Striker

Team information
- Current team: Rapid București (sporting director)

Youth career
- Sporting Pitești
- –1998: Școala de Fotbal Nicolae Dobrin

Senior career*
Years	Team	Apps	(Gls)
1998–2006	Argeş Piteşti	137	(20)
1999	→ FC Oneşti (loan)	20	(2)
2000	→ Politehnica Timişoara (loan)	6	(2)
2001–2002	→ FC Baia Mare (loan)	41	(12)
2007–2010	Unirea Urziceni	104	(29)
2010–2011	Steaua București	25	(5)
2011	Tianjin Teda	14	(3)
2012	Energie Cottbus	4	(0)
2012	Rapid București	4	(0)
Total		355	(73)

International career
2001	Romania U21	1	(0)
2010	Romania	5	(0)

Managerial career
- 2018–2020: CFR Cluj (scouting director)
- 2020–2021: CFR Cluj (sporting director)
- 2021: CFR Cluj (president)
- 2021–2026: CFR Cluj (sporting director)
- 2026: Rapid București (assistant sporting director)
- 2026–: Rapid București (sporting director)
- * Club domestic league appearances and goals

Marius Ioan Bilașco (born 13 July 1981) is a Romanian former professional footballer who played as a striker, currently sporting director at Liga I club Rapid București.

== Career ==
In October 2009, he scored his first UEFA Champions League goal in a 4–1 away win against Rangers F.C.

On 31 August 2010, he signed a contract with Steaua București alongside teammates from Unirea Urziceni: Galamaz, Ricardo, Marinescu, Apostol, Onofraş, and Brandán.

== Career statistics ==
=== Club ===
Appearances and goals by club, season and competition
Club	Season	League			National cup (Note: Includes Cupa României, Chinese FA Cup)		Continental		Other		Total	
Club	Season	Division	Apps	Goals	Apps	Goals	Apps	Goals	Apps	Goals	Apps	Goals
Argeș Pitești	1998–99	Divizia A	6	0	0	0	—		—		6	0
Argeș Pitești	1999–00	Divizia A	5	0	—		—		—		5	0
Argeș Pitești	2002–03	Divizia A	26	3	4	1	—		—		30	4
Argeș Pitești	2003–04	Divizia A	27	4	4	1	—		—		31	5
Argeș Pitești	2004–05	Divizia A	28	8	1	0	—		—		29	8
Argeș Pitești	2005–06	Divizia A	27	3	1	1	—		—		28	4
Argeș Pitești	2006–07	Liga I	18	2	2	0	—		—		20	2
Argeș Pitești	Total		137	20	12	3	0	0	0	0	149	23
FC Oneşti (loan)	1999–00	Divizia A	20	2	0	0	—		—		20	2
Politehnica Timișoara (loan)	2000–01	Divizia B	6	2	0	0	—		—		6	2
FC Baia-Mare (loan)	2000–01	Divizia B	14	4	—		—		—		14	4
FC Baia-Mare (loan)	2001–02	Divizia B	27	8	0	0	—		—		27	8
FC Baia-Mare (loan)	Total		41	12	0	0	0	0	0	0	41	12
Unirea Urziceni	2006–07	Liga I	14	2	—		—		—		14	2
Unirea Urziceni	2007–08	Liga I	28	6	5	1	—		—		33	7
Unirea Urziceni	2008–09	Liga I	27	8	1	0	2 (Note: Appearances in UEFA Cup)	0	—		30	8
Unirea Urziceni	2009–10	Liga I	30	12	1	0	8 (Note: Six appearances and one goal in UEFA Champions League, two appearances in UEFA Europa League)	1	1 (Note: Appearance in Supercupa României)	0	40	13
Unirea Urziceni	2010–11	Liga I	5	1	—		4 (Note: Two appearances in UEFA Champions League, two appearances in UEFA Europa League)	0	1	0	10	1
Unirea Urziceni	Total		104	29	7	1	14	1	2	0	127	31
Steaua București	2010–11	Liga I	25	5	6	0	0	0	—		31	5
Tianjin Teda	2011	Chinese Super League	14	3	2	0	—		—		16	3
Energie Cottbus	2011–12	2. Bundesliga	4	0	—		—		—		4	0
Rapid București	2012–13	Liga I	4	0	0	0	—		—		4	0
Career total			355	73	27	4	14	1	2	0	398	78

=== International ===
Appearances and goals by national team and year
National team	Year	Apps	Goals
Romania	2010	5	0
Total		5	0

== Honours ==
Unirea Urziceni

- Liga I: 2008–09
- Cupa României runner-up: 2007–08
- Supercupa României runner-up: 2009, 2010

Steaua București

- Cupa României: 2010–11
