= Raúl Martín (footballer, born 1982) =

Spanish footballer

Personal information
- Full name: Raúl Martín del Campo
- Date of birth: 27 July 1982 (age 44)
- Place of birth: Santander, Spain
- Height: 1.80 m (5 ft 11 in)
- Position: Forward

Youth career
- Perines
- Racing Santander

Senior career*
Years	Team	Apps	(Gls)
2001–2008	Racing B	65	(16)
2004–2005	Racing Santander	18	(0)
2004	→ Eibar (loan)	0	(0)
2005	→ Gimnástica (loan)	14	(5)
2008–2009	Mérida	4	(0)
2009–2010	Racing B	26	(7)
2010–2011	Gaz Metan Mediaș	4	(0)
Total		131	(28)
- * Club domestic league appearances and goals

Raúl Martín del Campo (born 27 July 1982) is a Spanish retired professional footballer who played as a forward.

== Club career ==
Born in Santander, Cantabria, Martín started his professional career with his hometown club Racing de Santander. He made his first-team – and La Liga – debut on 11 January 2004, playing 26 minutes in a 1–1 away draw against Deportivo de La Coruña after coming on as a substitute for Omri Afek.

Martín split the 2004–05 season on loan, at SD Eibar (Segunda División, no appearances) and Gimnástica de Torrelavega (Segunda División B, relegation). He returned to Racing for the 2005–06 campaign, going on to earn relative playing time as they narrowly avoided top-flight relegation; this included 75 minutes in the 2–1 win over Real Madrid at the Santiago Bernabéu Stadium on 21 December 2005.

However, Martín mostly represented the reserves during his spell at the Campos de Sport de El Sardinero, appearing for Mérida UD after being released and being relegated from the third tier in 2009 and 2010. He had his first abroad experience in summer 2010, joining Liga I side CS Gaz Metan Mediaș and leaving in late October 2011, having been rarely used due to a serious injury.
