= Claudiu Voiculeț =

Romanian footballer

Personal information
- Full name: Claudiu Dorian Voiculeț
- Date of birth: 8 August 1985 (age 41)
- Place of birth: Târgoviște, Romania
- Height: 1.70 m (5 ft 7 in)
- Position: Left winger

Youth career
- 1999–2003: FCM Târgoviște

Senior career*
Years	Team	Apps	(Gls)
2003–2004	FCM Târgoviște	18	(0)
2004–2009	Farul Constanța	100	(6)
2009–2010	Internațional	27	(3)
2010–2013	Pandurii Târgu Jiu	83	(13)
2013–2015	CFR Cluj	22	(1)
2014–2015	→ Târgu Mureș (loan)	43	(2)
2015–2016	Târgu Mureș	16	(1)
2016–2017	Pandurii Târgu Jiu	15	(0)
Total		329	(26)
- * Club domestic league appearances and goals as of 6 January 2018

Claudiu Dorian Voiculeț (born 8 August 1985 in Târgoviște, Dâmbovița County) is a Romanian former footballer who played as a midfielder.

== Club career ==
On 18 June 2013, Voiculeț signed a three-year deal with CFR Cluj.

In summer 2015, signed for ASA Targu Mures.

Voiculeț twice became runner-up in the Liga I, first in 2012–13 with Pandurii Târgu Jiu and second in 2014–15 with ASA Târgu Mureș.
