= 2010–11 Cupa României =

Tournament details
- Country: Romania
- Teams: 202

Final positions
- Champions: FCSB
- Runners-up: Dinamo București

Tournament statistics
- Matches played: 205
- Goals scored: 682 (3.33 per match)

The 2010–11 Cupa României was the seventy-third season of the annual Romanian football knockout tournament. It began on 17 July 2010 with the matches of the first round. For the third consecutive season, CFR Cluj were the defending champions. However, CFR were eliminated in the quarter-finals by Gloria Bistriţa, and the cup was won by FCSB for the first time after 12 years.

The winners of the competition qualified for the play-off round of the 2011–12 UEFA Europa League.

== Round of 32 ==
The 14 winners of the fifth phase entered in this round and were joined by the 18 teams from 2010–11 Liga I.

A more complex seeding process was employed for this round. The 32 teams were divided in three pots: A, B and C. Pot A contained the first 6 teams from the previous season of Liga I. Pot B contained the remaining 12 teams from Liga I, and pot C was filled with the 14 clubs from lower leagues. 6 teams from pot C were paired with teams from pot A, with the remaining 8 being drawn against clubs from pot B. Lastly, the four remaining teams from pot B were mated between them.

21 September 2010	Voința Sibiu (2)	3–1 (a.e.t.)	Gaz Metan Mediaș (1)	Sibiu
16:00 EEST (UTC+3)	Buican 33'; Eugen Beza 103'; I.Popa 104'	Report	Raúl Martin 37'	Stadium: Municipal; Attendance: 3,000; Referee: Emil Voicu

21 September 2010	Universitatea Cluj (1)	1–0	Victoria Brănești (1)	Alba Iulia
16:00 EEST (UTC+3)	Piț 48'	Report		Stadium: Cetate; Attendance: 150; Referee: Alexandru Tudor (Bucharest)

21 September 2010	ACU Arad (2)	0–1 (a.e.t.)	CFR Cluj (1)	Arad
18:00 EEST (UTC+3)		Report	Bud 116'	Stadium: Francisc von Neuman; Attendance: 3,500; Referee: Florin Marcu

21 September 2010	Universitatea Craiova (1)	5–0	Minerul Lupeni (2)	Craiova
18:00 EEST (UTC+3)	V.Găman 11'; Ologu 43'; M.Roman 52'; Gângioveanu 63', 83'	Report		Stadium: Ion Oblemenco; Attendance: 6,000; Referee: Radu Petrescu (Bucharest)

21 September 2010	Rapid București (1)	5–0	Petrolul Ploiești (2)	Bucharest
20:30 EEST (UTC+3)	Sburlea 15'; Grigorie 17'; António 19', 51'; Césinha 81'	Report		Stadium: Giulești-Valentin Stănescu; Attendance: 7,000; Referee: Ionel Ivan

22 September 2010	Juventus București (2)	1–3	Politehnica Timișoara (1)	Bucharest
16:00 EEST (UTC+3)	Nica 73'	Report	Mansour 19'; Tameș 34'; Goga 51'	Stadium: Colentina; Attendance: 3,000; Referee: Andrei Chivulete (Bucharest)

22 September 2010	Unirea Urziceni (1)	1–0	Delta Tulcea (2)	Urziceni
16:00 EEST (UTC+3)	Bâtfoi 11'	Report		Stadium: Tineretului; Attendance: 200; Referee: Dragoș Istrate (Bucharest)

22 September 2010	Alro Slatina (2)	0–0 (a.e.t.) (4–3 p)	FC Vaslui (1)	Slatina
16:00 EEST (UTC+3)		Report		Stadium: Metalurgistul; Attendance: 4,000; Referee: Georgian Ionescu
	Penalties
	Voicu (penalty scored); Dumitra (penalty scored); Kalai (penalty missed); Pasăre (penalty scored); Precup (penalty scored)		(penalty scored) Zmeu; (penalty scored) Milanov; (penalty scored) Adaílton; (penalty missed) Wesley; (penalty missed) Yero

22 September 2010	Sportul Studențesc București (1)	3–1	Otopeni (2)	Bucharest
16:00 EEST (UTC+3)	C.Gheorghe 7'; Curelea 81'; M.Postolache 90'	Report	Cl.Dumitrescu 72'	Stadium: Regie; Attendance: 200; Referee: Lucian Ruşandu (Sfântu Gheorghe)

22 September 2010	Silvania Șimleu Silvaniei (2)	0–1	FCM Târgu Mureș (1)	Șimleu Silvaniei
16:00 EEST (UTC+3)		Report	Astafei 78'	Stadium: Măgura; Attendance: 600; Referee: Dan Monea

22 September 2010	Gloria Bistrița (1)	3–0	Astra II Giurgiu (2)	Bistrița
16:00 EEST (UTC+3)	Nalați 22'; Coroian 42'; J. Moraes 76'	Report		Stadium: Jean Pădureanu; Attendance: 1,200; Referee: Paul Unimatan (Zalău)

22 September 2010	Pandurii Târgu Jiu (1)	3–2	Viitorul Constanța (2)	Târgu Jiu
18:30 EEST (UTC+3)	Cardoso 7', 89'; Ad.D.Iordache 82'	Report	Cârstocea 27'; R.Benzar 90'	Stadium: Tudor Vladimirescu; Attendance: 1,000; Referee: Marian Balaci

22 September 2010	Dinamo București (1)	2–0	Ceahlăul Piatra Neamț (2)	Bucharest
20:30 EEST (UTC+3)	Moți 13'; An.Cristea 60' (pen.)	Report		Stadium: Dinamo; Attendance: 500; Referee: Mugurel Drăgănescu (Sinaia)

23 September 2010	Chimia Brazi (2)	0–1	FC Brașov (1)	Brazi
16:00 EEST (UTC+3)		Report	Diarrassouba 4'	Stadium: Chimia; Attendance: 800; Referee: Marin Bordean

23 September 2010	Astra Ploiești (1)	2–1	Oțelul Galați (1)	Ploiești
18:30 EEST (UTC+3)	Lukács 7', 69'	Report	Giurgiu 90'	Stadium: Astra; Attendance: 1,500; Referee: Sebastian Colțescu (Craiova)

23 September 2010	Gaz Metan CFR Craiova (2)	0–1	Steaua București (1)	Craiova
20:30 EEST (UTC+3)		Report	B.Nicoliță 63'	Stadium: Ion Oblemenco; Attendance: 7,000; Referee: Adrian Comănescu

== Round of 16 ==
26 October 2010	FC Brașov (1)	2–1	Universitatea Cluj (1)	Brașov
16:00 EEST (UTC+3)	Chipciu 5'; V.Badea 86'	Report	Lemnaru 52'	Stadium: Silviu Ploeșteanu; Attendance: 1,000; Referee: Paul Unimatan (Zalău)

26 October 2010	Politehnica Timișoara (1)	1–1 (a.e.t.) (4–3 p)	Voința Sibiu (2)	Timișoara
18:30 EEST (UTC+3)	Dorin Goga 13'	Report	Bunea 87'	Stadium: Dan Păltinișanu; Attendance: 1,000; Referee: Marian Balaci
	Penalties
	Sepsi (penalty scored); Zicu (penalty scored); Tameș (penalty scored); Scutaru (penalty missed); Magera (penalty scored)		(penalty scored) N.Grigore; (penalty scored) Beza; (penalty missed) M.Burlacu; (penalty missed) Hardău; (penalty scored) Popa

26 October 2010	Dinamo București (1)	3–1	Alro Slatina (2)	Bucharest
21:00 EEST (UTC+3)	M.Niculae 2'; Alexe 8', 36'	Report	Bârsan 39'	Stadium: Dinamo; Attendance: 700; Referee: Georgian Ionescu

27 October 2010	Gloria Bistrița (1)	1–0	Unirea Urziceni (1)	Bistrița
16:00 EEST (UTC+3)	J.Moraes 67'	Report		Stadium: Jean Pădureanu; Attendance: 500; Referee: Augustus Constantin (Ploiești)

27 October 2010	CFR Cluj (1)	2–0	FCM Târgu Mureș (1)	Cluj-Napoca
18:30 EEST (UTC+3)	Bjelanović 31'; Sforzini 90'	Report		Stadium: Dr. Constantin Rădulescu; Attendance: 4,500; Referee: Dragoș Istrate (Bucharest)

27 October 2010	Steaua București (1)	1–1 (a.e.t.) (3–1 p)	Sportul Studențesc București (1)	Bucharest
20:45 EEST (UTC+3)	Latovlevici 73'	Report	T.Bălan 18'	Stadium: Steaua; Attendance: 3,000; Referee: Alexandru Deaconu (Bucharest)
	Penalties
	Székely (penalty scored); Bilașco (penalty scored); Kapetanos (penalty missed); Angelov (penalty scored)		(penalty missed) Rațiu; (penalty scored) Irimia; (penalty missed) Bălan; (penalty missed) Varga

28 October 2010	Pandurii Târgu Jiu (1)	0–2	Universitatea Craiova (1)	Târgu Jiu
18:30 EEST (UTC+3)		Report	Wobay 33'; Prepeliță 53'	Stadium: Tudor Vladimirescu; Attendance: 5,000; Referee: Alexandru Tudor (Bucharest)

28 October 2010	Astra Ploiești (1)	0–2 (a.e.t.)	Rapid București (1)	Ploiești
20:45 EEST (UTC+3)		Report	Frunză 93', 111'	Stadium: Astra; Attendance: 2,000; Referee: Radu Petrescu (Bucharest)

== Quarter-finals ==
10 November 2010	FC Brașov (1)	1–0	Politehnica Timișoara (1)	Braşov
17:00 EET (UTC+2)	Cristescu 90+3'	Report		Stadium: Silviu Ploeşteanu; Attendance: 2,000; Referee: Alexandru Deaconu

10 November 2010	Dinamo București (1)	1–1 (a.e.t.) (3–1 p)	FC U Craiova (1)	Bucharest
20:45 EET (UTC+2)	Munteanu 66'	Report	Dina 31'	Stadium: Dinamo; Attendance: 10,000; Referee: Robert Dumitru
	Penalties
	An.Cristea (penalty scored); Munteanu (penalty scored); Ad.Cristea (penalty scored); Bordeanu (penalty missed)		(penalty missed) Găman; (penalty missed) Bărboianu; (penalty scored) Ologu; (penalty missed) Costea

11 November 2010	CFR Cluj (1)	0–1	Gloria Bistriţa (1)	Cluj-Napoca
17:00 EET (UTC+2)		Report	J. Moraes 73' (pen.)	Stadium: Dr. Constantin Rădulescu; Attendance: 7,000; Referee: Cristian Balaj

11 November 2010	Rapid București (1)	0–1	Steaua București (1)	Bucharest
20:45 EET (UTC+2)		Report	Surdu 49'	Stadium: Giuleşti-Valentin Stănescu; Attendance: 10,000; Referee: Alexandru Tudor

== Semi-finals ==
Team 1	Agg.	Team 2	1st leg	2nd leg
Gloria Bistriţa	1–7	Dinamo București	0–2	1–5
Steaua București	1–1 (a)	FC Brașov	0–0	1–1

=== First leg ===
20 April 2011	Gloria Bistriţa (1)	0–2	Dinamo București (1)	Bistriţa
20:45 EEST (UTC+3)			Dănciulescu 53'; Alexe 87'	Stadium: Gloria; Attendance: 5,500; Referee: Augustus Constantin

21 April 2011	Steaua București (1)	0–0	FC Brașov (1)	Bucharest
20:45 EEST (UTC+3)				Stadium: Steaua; Attendance: 7,000; Referee: Cristian Balaj

=== Second leg ===
11 May 2011	FC Brașov (1)	1–1 (1–1 a agg.)	Steaua București (1)	Braşov
20:45 EEST (UTC+3)	Ilyeş 41' (pen.)		Dică 86'	Stadium: Silviu Ploeşteanu; Attendance: 8,000; Referee: Cristian Balaj

12 May 2011	Dinamo București (1)	5–1 (7–1 agg.)	Gloria Bistriţa (1)	Bucharest
20:45 EEST (UTC+3)	Munteanu 10'; Dănciulescu 27' (pen.), 61'; Ţucudean 53', 90'		Pădurariu 45'	Stadium: Dinamo

== Final ==
25 May 2011
21:15 EEST

Dinamo București	1–2	Steaua București
Torje 33'	Report	Dică 24'; Bărboianu 51' (o.g.)

Silviu Ploeșteanu, Brașov
Attendance: 7,500
Referee: Marius Avram
