= 2009–10 FC Brașov season =

FC Brașov
2009–10 season
- Chairman: Dinu Gheorghe
- Manager: Viorel Moldovan
- Stadium: Silviu Ploeşteanu
- Liga I: 9th
- Cupa României: Semifinals
- Top goalscorer: Robert Ilyeş (7)
- Highest home attendance: 8,500 (vs Steaua București, September 27, 2009)
- Lowest home attendance: 500 (vs Gloria Bistriţa, May 6, 2010)
- Average home league attendance: 3,142
Home colours	Away colours

FC Braşov started the 2009–2010 season of Liga I with the goal of qualifying for the Europa League.

== Manager ==
On April 29, 2009, Răzvan Lucescu was appointed head coach of the national football team and resigned from his position at FC Braşov at the end of the season. The Italian Nicolò Napoli was brought to replace Răzvan Lucescu as the main coach, but left the club after only three weeks, on July 27 during the season break, accusing familial problems. Viorel Moldovan was appointed as main coach the same day. However, a month later Napoli signed a contract with another Liga I team, Astra Ploieşti.

== Squad ==
As of May 2010

Note: Flags indicate national team as defined under FIFA eligibility rules; some limited exceptions apply. Players may hold more than one non-FIFA nationality.

No.	Pos.	Nation	Player
1	GK	ROU	Dănuţ Coman
2	DF	POR	Rui Duarte
3	DF	BRA	Ezequias
4	DF	ROU	Octavian Abrudan
5	MF	ROU	Alexandru Chipciu
6	MF	CPV	Néné
7	MF	ROU	Cătălin Munteanu
8	MF	ROU	Nicolae Grigore
9	FW	ROU	Attila Hadnagy
10	MF	ROU	Róbert Ilyés (captain)
11	FW	ROU	Dorel Zaharia
12	DF	ROU	Cristian Ionescu
13	GK	ROU	Gabriel Kajcsa
14	MF	ROU	Mihai Roman

No.	Pos.	Nation	Player
15	DF	ROU	Cristian Oroş
17	FW	ROU	Cătălin Dedu
18	MF	ROU	Marian Cristescu
19	FW	MKD	Dušan Savić
20	DF	ROU	Ionuţ Voicu
21	FW	ROU	Sabrin Sburlea
23	DF	ROU	Nicolae Constantin
24	MF	PER	Julio Landauri
25	MF	ROU	Stelian Stancu
26	MF	ROU	Alexandru Mateiu
27	MF	ROU	Marius Măldărăşanu
32	GK	ROU	Mihai Mincă
55	DF	POR	Nuno Diogo

== Transfers ==
=== Pre-season ===
In:

Out:

No.	Pos.	Nation	Player
6	MF	CPV	Nené (from Enosis Neon Paralimni)
8	MF	ROU	Nicolae Grigore (free transfer)
11	FW	ROU	Dorel Zaharia (returned from the loan at Gloria Bistriţa)
28	FW	ROU	Alexandru Piţurcă (free transfer)
32	GK	ROU	Mihai Mincă (free transfer)
55	DF	POR	Nuno Diogo

No.	Pos.	Nation	Player
–	MF	ROU	Alin Stoica (to FK Vojvodina)
6	MF	POR	Paulo Adriano (end of contract)
16	GK	ROU	Bogdan Stelea (retired at the age of 41)
24	FW	ROU	Romeo Surdu (went back from loan to Steaua București)
22	FW	ROU	Mugurel Buga (went back from loan to Rapid București)

=== Mid-season ===
In:

Out:

No.	Pos.	Nation	Player
19	FW	MKD	Dušan Savić (free transfer)
24	MF	PER	Julio Landauri (from Universitario de Deportes)
25	DF	ROU	Stelian Stancu (free transfer)

No.	Pos.	Nation	Player
19	DF	ROU	Bogdan Nicolae (released on free transfer)
25	MF	ROU	Adrian Senin (released on free transfer)
28	FW	ROU	Alexandru Piţurcă (released on free transfer)
29	FW	ROU	Alexandru Bălţoi (released on free transfer)

== Liga I ==
=== League table ===
Pos	Team	Pld	W	D	L	GF	GA	GD	Pts
7	Rapid București	34	14	10	10	53	38	+15	52
8	Oțelul Galați	34	14	8	12	38	38	0	50
9	Brașov	34	12	10	12	40	30	+10	46
10	Gaz Metan Mediaș	34	9	15	10	33	37	−4	42
11	Gloria Bistrița	34	10	11	13	35	46	−11	41

Source: LPF (in Romanian)
Rules for classification: 1) points; 2) head-to-head points; 3) head-to-head goal difference; 4) head-to-head goals scored; 5) goal difference; 6) number of goals scored.

=== Results summary ===
Overall								Home						Away					
Pld	W	D	L	GF	GA	GD	Pts	W	D	L	GF	GA	GD	W	D	L	GF	GA	GD
34	12	10	12	40	30	+10	46	9	5	3	25	9	+16	3	5	9	15	21	−6

=== Results by round ===
Round	1	2	3	4	5	6	7	8	9	10	11	12	13	14	15	16	17	18	19	20	21	22	23	24	25	26	27	28	29	30	31	32	33	34
Ground	A	H	A	H	A	H	A	H	A	H	A	H	H	A	H	A	H	H	A	H	A	H	A	H	A	H	A	H	A	A	H	A	H	A
Result	W	D	D	W	W	W	L	D	D	L	D	W	D	L	W	L	W	W	L	D	L	L	L	L	L	W	D	W	L	L	W	D	D	W
Position	4	5	6	1	1	1	1	4	5	7	8	8	8	8	8	8	7	7	8	8	8	9	9	9	9	9	9	9	9	9	9	9	9	9

Source: Matches
A = Away; H = Home; W = Win; D = Draw; L = Loss

=== Results ===
August 1, 2009 Round 1	Unirea Alba Iulia	0–1	Braşov	Alba Iulia
18:00		Report	Hadnagy 82'	Stadium: Cetate; Attendance: 5,000; Referee: Marian Bordean

August 8, 2009 Round 2	Braşov	0–0	Astra Ploieşti	Braşov
18:30		Report		Stadium: Silviu Ploeşteanu; Attendance: 2,500; Referee: Ion Buşi

August 16, 2009 Round 3	Vaslui	2–2	Braşov	Vaslui
19:00	Wesley 52'; Zubar 81'	Report	Ezequias 15'; Roman 58'	Stadium: Municipal; Attendance: 4,000; Referee: Radu Petrescu

August 21, 2009 Round 4	Braşov	2–0	Universitatea Craiova	Braşov
18:00	Nuno Diogo 30'; Zaharia 59'	Report		Stadium: Silviu Ploeşteanu; Attendance: 5,000; Referee: Marius Avram

August 28, 2009 Round 5	Internaţional Curtea de Argeş	0–3	Braşov	Mioveni
20:30		Report	Ilyeş 13' (pen.); Hadnagy 16'; Munteanu 25'	Stadium: Dacia; Attendance: 2,000; Referee: Victor Berbecaru

September 11, 2009 Round 6	Braşov	1–0	Ceahlăul Piatra Neamţ	Braşov
21:30	Ilyeş 76' (pen.)	Report		Stadium: Silviu Ploeşteanu; Attendance: 4,000; Referee: Laurenţiu Dânşa

September 20, 2009 Round 7	CFR Cluj	2–1	Braşov	Cluj-Napoca
18:00	Dubarbier 23'; Cadú 28'	Report	Alcântara 27'	Stadium: Dr. Constantin Rădulescu; Attendance: 6,000; Referee: Augustus Constantin

September 27, 2009 Round 8	Braşov	0–0	Steaua București	Braşov
20:00		Report		Stadium: Silviu Ploeşteanu; Attendance: 8,500; Referee: Alexandru Tudor

October 2, 2009 Round 9	Oţelul Galaţi	1–1	Braşov	Galaţi
16:00	Giurgiu 48'	Report	Voicu 34'	Stadium: Oţelul; Attendance: 1,000; Referee: Alexandru Deaconu

October 18, 2009 Round 10	Braşov	0–1	Dinamo București	Braşov
20:30		Report	Cristea 27'	Stadium: Silviu Ploeşteanu; Attendance: 6,000; Referee: Cristian Balaj

October 23, 2009 Round 11	Gaz Metan Mediaş	1–1	Braşov	Mediaş
20:00	Hoban 53'	Report	Cristescu 42'	Stadium: Gaz Metan; Attendance: 2,500; Referee: Ovidiu Haţegan

November 2, 2009 Round 12	Braşov	2–0	Pandurii Târgu Jiu	Braşov
20:00	Măldărăşanu 44'; Ilyeş 62'	Report		Stadium: Silviu Ploeşteanu; Attendance: 2,500; Referee: Alexandru Tudor

November 7, 2009 Round 13	Braşov	0–0	Unirea Urziceni	Braşov
21:15		Report		Stadium: Silviu Ploeşteanu; Attendance: 4,000; Referee: Teodor Crăciunescu

November 22, 2009 Round 14	Gloria Bistriţa	2–1	Braşov	Bistriţa
17:00	Coroian 7'; Hora 68' (pen.)	Report	Ilyeş 27' (pen.)	Stadium: Gloria; Attendance: 3,000; Referee: Istvan Kovacs

November 30, 2009 Round 15	Braşov	2–0	Politehnica Iaşi	Braşov
18:00	Zaharia 71'; Sburlea 79'	Report		Stadium: Silviu Ploeşteanu; Attendance: 2,000; Referee: Marian Balaci

December 5, 2009 Round 16	Rapid București	2–1	Braşov	București
20:00	Ioniţă 23'; Grigorie 66'	Report	Voicu 68'	Stadium: Valentin Stănescu; Attendance: 4,100; Referee: Augustus Constantin

December 13, 2009 Round 17	Braşov	1–0	Timișoara	Braşov
18:00	Nuno Diogo 7'	Report		Stadium: Silviu Ploeşteanu; Attendance: 4,000; Referee: Ovidiu Haţegan

February 20, 2010 Round 18	Braşov	2–1	Unirea Alba Iulia	Braşov
13:30	Zaharia 28'; Sburlea 85'	Report	Cristea 27'	Stadium: Silviu Ploeşteanu; Attendance: 3,000; Referee: Georgian Ionescu

February 28, 2010 Round 19	Astra Ploieşti	2–1	Braşov	Ploieşti
17:00	Ganea 15'; Ganea 83'	Report	Ilyeş 86' (pen.)	Stadium: Astra; Attendance: 2,000; Referee: Radu Petrescu

March 8, 2010 Round 20	Braşov	1–1	Vaslui	Braşov
17:00	Abrudan 64'	Report	Delgado 20'	Stadium: Silviu Ploeşteanu; Attendance: 3,000; Referee: Alexandru Deaconu

March 13, 2010 Round 21	Universitatea Craiova	3–0	Braşov	Drobeta-Turnu Severin
15:00	Găman 15'; Barbu 25'; M. Costea 35'	Report		Stadium: Municipal; Attendance: 10,000; Referee: Marius Avram

March 16, 2010 Round 22	Braşov	1–2	Internaţional Curtea de Argeş	Braşov
18:00	Zaharia 11'	Report	Koné 29'; Băcilă 80'	Stadium: Silviu Ploeşteanu; Attendance: 1,000; Referee: Cătălin Buşi

March 20, 2010 Round 23	Ceahlăul Piatra Neamţ	2–1	Braşov	Piatra Neamţ
15:00	Mulisa 15'; Cebotaru 24'	Report	Dušan Savić 23'	Stadium: Ceahlăul; Attendance: 3,000; Referee: Ovidiu Haţegan

March 29, 2010 Round 24	Braşov	0–1	CFR Cluj	Braşov
20:00		Report	Bud 19'	Stadium: Silviu Ploeşteanu; Attendance: 4,000; Referee: Sebastian Colţescu

April 2, 2010 Round 25	Steaua București	1–0	Braşov	București
18:30	Pleşan 6'	Report		Stadium: Steaua; Attendance: 4,000; Referee: Augustus Constantin

April 6, 2010 Round 26	Braşov	3–0	Oţelul Galaţi	Braşov
20:00	Abrudan 2'; Sburlea 19'; Roman 81'	Report		Stadium: Silviu Ploeşteanu; Attendance: 750; Referee: Ovidiu Haţegan

April 11, 2010 Round 27	Dinamo București	0–0	Braşov	București
19:30		Report		Stadium: Dinamo; Attendance: 3,000; Referee: Georgian Ionescu

April 18, 2010 Round 28	Braşov	3–2	Gaz Metan Mediaş	Braşov
18:30	Grigore 11' (pen.); Sburlea 38'; Hadnagy 50'	Report	A. Munteanu 58'; Liţu 78'	Stadium: Silviu Ploeşteanu; Attendance: 700; Referee: Cristian Balaj

April 24, 2010 Round 29	Pandurii Târgu Jiu	1–0	Braşov	Târgu Jiu
15:00	Hidişan 77' (pen.)	Report		Stadium: Tudor Vladimirescu; Attendance: 5,000; Referee: Paul Unimatan

May 2, 2010 Round 30	Unirea Urziceni	1–0	Braşov	Urziceni
18:30	Rusescu 82'	Report		Stadium: Tineretului; Attendance: 3,000; Referee: Sebastian Colţescu

May 6, 2010 Round 31	Braşov	6–0	Gloria Bistriţa	Braşov
16:30	Abrudan 49'; Munteanu 63'; Sburlea 66'; Năstase 67' (o.g.); Chipciu 77'; Hadnagy 79'	Report		Stadium: Silviu Ploeşteanu; Attendance: 500; Referee: Florin Marcu

May 11, 2010 Round 32	Politehnica Iaşi	0–0	Braşov	Iaşi
18:00		Report		Stadium: Emil Alexandrescu; Attendance: 4,000; Referee: Cristian Balaj

May 16, 2010 Round 33	Braşov	1–1	Rapid București	Braşov
18:00	Roman 26'	Report	Săpunaru 90' (pen.)	Stadium: Silviu Ploeşteanu; Attendance: 3,000; Referee: Georgian Ionescu

May 22, 2010 Round 34	Timișoara	1–2	Braşov	Timișoara
14:30	Chiacu 61'	Report	Dušan Savić 10'; Cristescu 16'	Stadium: Dan Păltinişanu; Attendance: 3,000; Referee: Claudiu Baboia

== Cupa României ==
September 22, 2009 Round of 32	Braşov	4 – 0 (a.e.t.)	Otopeni	Braşov
18:00	Grigore 105'; Cristescu 111'; Hadnagy 119'; Munteanu 120'	Report		Stadium: Silviu Ploeşteanu; Attendance: 3,000; Referee: Andrei Chivulete

October 27, 2009 Round of 16	Unirea Urziceni	0–1	Braşov	Urziceni
21:30		Report	D. Munteanu 12' (o.g.)	Stadium: Tineretului; Attendance: 2,000; Referee: Sebastian Colţescu

November 17, 2009 Round of 8	Braşov	3–0	Gloria Bistriţa	Braşov
19:00	Hadnagy 4'; Zaharia 30'; Ilyeş 60' (pen.)	Report		Stadium: Silviu Ploeşteanu; Attendance: 2,500; Referee: Marius Avram

March 3, 2010 Semifinals, First leg	Braşov	1–0	Vaslui	Braşov
20:15	Ilyeş 5'	Report		Stadium: Silviu Ploeşteanu; Attendance: 5,000; Referee: Alexandru Tudor

April 15, 2010 Semifinals, Second leg	Vaslui	4–0	Braşov	Vaslui
20:15	Costin 28'; Wesley 29'; Sânmărtean 53'; Costly 73'	Report		Stadium: Municipal; Attendance: 7,000; Referee: Marius Avram
