= 2008–09 Liga I =

91st season of top-tier football league in Romania

Liga I
- Season: 2008–09
- Champions: Unirea Urziceni
- Relegated: Argeș Pitești; Farul Constanța; Otopeni; Gloria Buzău
- Champions League: Unirea Urziceni; Timișoara
- Europa League: Dinamo București; CFR Cluj; Vaslui; Steaua București
- Matches: 306
- Goals: 707 (2.31 per match)
- Top goalscorer: Gheorghe Bucur, Florin Costea (17)
- Biggest home win: Otopeni 6–0 Farul
- Biggest away win: Pandurii 1–5 Unirea; Buzău 1–5 Unirea; Otopeni 0–4 CFR
- Highest scoring: Argeș 5–2 Dinamo; Vaslui 4–3 Timișoara; Gaz Metan 2–5 Universitatea
- Longest winning run: Timișoara (7)
- Longest unbeaten run: Urziceni (13)
- Longest winless run: Buzău (19)
- Longest losing run: Otopeni, Buzău (7)
- Highest attendance: Timișoara–Steaua (30,000)
- Lowest attendance: Otopeni–Bistrița (100)

The 2008–09 Liga I was the ninety-first season of Liga I, the top-level football league of Romania. Season began on 26 July 2008 and ended on 10 June 2009. CFR Cluj were the defending champions.

== Teams ==
=== Promoted ===
Teams promoted from Liga II at the beginning of the season.

- Serie 1 Champions: Brașov
- Serie 2 Champions: Argeș Pitești
- Serie 1 Runners-up: Otopeni
- Serie 2 Runners-up: Gaz Metan Mediaș

=== Relegated ===
Teams relegated to Liga II at the end of season.

- Argeș Pitești
- Farul Constanța
- Otopeni
- Gloria Buzău

=== Venues ===
FC Timișoara	Steaua București	FC U Craiova	CFR Cluj
Dan Păltinișanu	Steaua	Ion Oblemenco	Dr. Constantin Rădulescu
Capacity: 32,972	Capacity: 28,365	Capacity: 25,252	Capacity: 23,500
Gloria Buzău	Farul Constanța	Dinamo București	Argeș Pitești
Municipal	Farul	Dinamo	Nicolae Dobrin
Capacity: 18,000	Capacity: 15,520	Capacity: 15,032	Capacity: 15,000
Oțelul Galați	2008–09 Liga I (Romania) Location of Bucharest teams.		Rapid București
Oțelul	2008–09 Liga I (Romania) Location of Bucharest teams.		Giulești-Valentin Stănescu
Capacity: 13,500	2008–09 Liga I (Romania) Location of Bucharest teams.		Capacity: 11,704 (Note: Capacity of Giulești-Valentin Stănescu Stadium has been reduced from 19,100 to 11,704 due to advanced degradation of the resistance structure of the South End.)
Politehnica Iași	2008–09 Liga I (Romania) Location of Bucharest teams.		FC Vaslui
Emil Alexandrescu	2008–09 Liga I (Romania) Location of Bucharest teams.		Municipal
Capacity: 11,390	2008–09 Liga I (Romania) Location of Bucharest teams.		Capacity: 9,240
Pandurii Târgu Jiu	2008–09 Liga I (Romania) Location of Bucharest teams.		FC Brașov
Tudor Vladimirescu	2008–09 Liga I (Romania) Location of Bucharest teams.		Silviu Ploeșteanu
Capacity: 9,200	2008–09 Liga I (Romania) Location of Bucharest teams.		Capacity: 8,800
Gloria Bistrița	CS Otopeni (Note: CS Otopeni was relocated to Astra Stadium from Ploiești because Otopeni Stadium from Otopeni does not meet the standards for Liga I.)	Unirea Urziceni	Gaz Metan Mediaș
Gloria	Astra	Tineretului	Gaz Metan
Capacity: 7,800	Capacity: 7,000	Capacity: 7,000	Capacity: 5,300

=== Personnel and kits ===
Team	Head coach	Captain	Kit manufacturer	Shirt Sponsor
Argeș Pitești	(Romania) Ionuț Badea	(Romania) Daniel Bălașa	Adidas	Pic
Brașov	(Romania) Răzvan Lucescu	(Romania) Robert Ilyeș	Diadora	Roman
CFR Cluj	(Portugal) António Conceição	(Portugal) Cadú	Nike	DOMO Group, Sigma Towers
Dinamo București	(Romania) Mircea Rednic	(Romania) Marius Niculae	Nike	Orange
Farul Constanța	(Romania) Lucian Marinof	(Romania) George Curcă	Umbro	SNC
FC U Craiova	(Romania) Ionel Gane	(Romania) Dorel Stoica	Adidas	editie.ro
Gaz Metan Mediaș	(Romania) Cristian Pustai	(Romania) Claudiu Boaru	Joma	RomGaz
Gloria Bistrița	(Romania) Ioan Sabău	(Romania) Adrian Nalați	Puma	Teraplast, Aldis, Darimex
Gloria Buzău	(Romania) Constantin Cârstea	(Senegal) Mansour Gueye	Hummel	—
Otopeni	(Romania) Liviu Ciobotariu	(Romania) Florin Pârvu	Kappa	Urban
Oțelul Galați	(Romania) Petre Grigoraș	(Romania) Gabriel Paraschiv	Hummel	ArcelorMittal
Pandurii Târgu Jiu	(Romania) Sorin Cârțu	(Romania) Florin Stângă	Umbro	USMO
Politehnica Iași	(Italy) Cristiano Bergodi	(Romania) Bogdan Onuț	Nike	Iulius Mall
Rapid București	(Romania) Viorel Hizo	(Romania) Vasile Maftei	Lotto	Arsis
Steaua București	(Italy) Massimo Pedrazzini	(Romania) Sorin Ghionea	Nike	CitiFinancial
Timișoara	(Romania) Valentin Velcea	(Armenia) Artavazd Karamyan	Lotto	Balkan Petroleum
Unirea Urziceni	(Romania) Dan Petrescu	(Romania) George Galamaz	Givova	Alexandrion
Vaslui	(Romania) Cristian Dulca	(Romania) Gabriel Cânu	Umbro	Kia Motors

=== Managerial changes ===
Team	Outgoing manager	Manner of departure	Date of vacancy	Replaced by	Date of appointment
Dinamo București	(Romania) Cornel Țălnar	Contract not renewed	17 April 2008	(Romania) Mircea Rednic	17 April 2008
Rapid București	(Romania) Marian Rada	Contract not renewed	3 June 2008	(Portugal) José Peseiro	3 June 2008
Vaslui	(Romania) Emil Săndoi	Contract not renewed	10 June 2008	(Romania) Viorel Hizo	10 June 2008
Otopeni	(Romania) Liviu Ciobotariu	Contract not renewed	18 June 2008	(Serbia) Miodrag Ješić	21 June 2008
Gloria Buzău	(Romania) Ștefan Stoica	Sacked	11 August 2008	(Portugal) Álvaro Magalhães	12 August 2008
Otopeni	(Serbia) Miodrag Ješić	Caretaker	18 August 2008	(Romania) Gabriel Mărgărit	18 August 2008
CFR Cluj	(Romania) Ioan Andone	Sacked	30 August 2008	(Italy) Maurizio Trombetta	1 September 2008
Otopeni	(Romania) Gabriel Mărgărit	Sacked	8 September 2008	(Romania) Marian Bucurescu	8 September 2008
Pandurii Târgu Jiu	(Romania) Eugen Neagoe	Sacked	21 September 2008	(Romania) Sorin Cârțu	21 September 2008
Rapid București	(Portugal) José Peseiro	Sacked	2 October 2008	(Romania) Nicolae Manea	3 October 2008
Gloria Buzău	(Portugal) Álvaro Magalhães	Sacked	3 October 2008	(Romania) Mario Marinică	9 October 2008
Rapid București	(Romania) Nicolae Manea	Caretaker	9 October 2008	(Portugal) José Peseiro	9 October 2008
Steaua București	(Romania) Marius Lăcătuș	Resigned	22 October 2008	(Romania) Dorinel Munteanu	26 October 2008
Vaslui	(Romania) Viorel Hizo	Sacked	1 November 2008	(Romania) Viorel Moldovan	1 November 2008
Otopeni	(Romania) Marian Bucurescu	Resigned	24 November 2008	(Romania) Liviu Ciobotariu	24 November 2008
Timișoara	(Czech Republic) Dušan Uhrin, Jr.	Sacked	2 December 2008	(Romania) Gavril Balint	29 December 2008
Gloria Buzău	(Romania) Mario Marinică	Sacked	17 December 2008	(Romania) Constantin Cârstea	28 January 2009
Steaua București	(Romania) Dorinel Munteanu	Sacked	31 December 2008	(Romania) Marius Lăcătuș	1 January 2009
CFR Cluj	(Italy) Maurizio Trombetta	Sacked	6 January 2009	(Czech Republic) Ales Jindra and (Czech Republic) Dušan Uhrin, Jr.	8 January 2009
Politehnica Iași	(Romania) Ionuț Popa	Resigned	11 January 2009	(Italy) Cristiano Bergodi	18 January 2009
Rapid București	(Portugal) José Peseiro	Sacked	12 January 2009	(Romania) Marian Rada	14 January 2009
CFR Cluj	(Czech Republic) Ales Jindra and (Czech Republic) Dušan Uhrin, Jr.	Sacked	5 April 2009	(Portugal) Toni	6 April 2009
Farul Constanța	(Romania) Ion Marin	Resigned	13 April 2009	(Romania) Lucian Marinof	13 April 2009
Rapid București	(Romania) Marian Rada	Resigned	17 April 2009	(Romania) Viorel Hizo	3 May 2009
Universitatea Craiova	(Italy) Nicolo Napoli	Sacked	15 May 2009	(Romania) Ionel Gane	15 May 2009
Steaua București	(Romania) Marius Lăcătuș	Resigned	17 May 2009	(Italy) Massimo Pedrazzini	18 May 2009
Vaslui	(Romania) Viorel Moldovan	Resigned	26 May 2009	(Romania) Cristian Dulca	26 May 2009
Timișoara	(Romania) Gavril Balint	Sacked	31 May 2009	(Romania) Valentin Velcea	1 June 2009

== League table ==
Pos	Team	Pld	W	D	L	GF	GA	GD	Pts	Qualification or relegation
1	Unirea Urziceni (C)	34	21	7	6	51	20	+31	70	Qualification to Champions League group stage
2	FC Timișoara	34	20	7	7	58	38	+20	67 (Note: Timișoara were docked 6 points after not respecting a ruling from CAS. However, this decision was revoked by the CAS on 11 June 2009.)	Qualification to Champions League third qualifying round
3	Dinamo București	34	20	5	9	56	30	+26	65	Qualification to Europa League play-off round (Note: CFR Cluj as the 2008–09 Cupa României winners qualified for the play-off round of the 2009–10 UEFA Europa League.)
4	CFR Cluj	34	16	11	7	44	26	+18	59	Qualification to Europa League play-off round
5	Vaslui	34	17	6	11	44	37	+7	57	Qualification to Europa League third qualifying round
6	Steaua București	34	14	14	6	44	27	+17	56 (Note: STE 2–1 CRA; CRA 0–0 STE)	Qualification to Europa League second qualifying round
7	Universitatea Craiova	34	15	11	8	44	25	+19	56	
8	Rapid București	34	16	7	11	44	34	+10	55 (Note: RAP 3–1 BRA; BRA 0–0 RAP)	
9	Brașov	34	14	13	7	35	25	+10	55	
10	Argeș Pitești (R)	34	12	8	14	41	47	−6	44	Relegation to Liga II (Note: Argeș Pitești were relegated to the Liga II due to allegations of referee bribery. Gaz Metan as best-placed relegated team were therefore spared from relegation.)
11	Pandurii Târgu Jiu	34	11	10	13	27	36	−9	43	
12	Oțelul Galați	34	11	7	16	37	48	−11	40	
13	Gloria Bistrița	34	11	5	18	32	44	−12	38	
14	Politehnica Iași	34	10	7	17	32	47	−15	37	
15	Gaz Metan Mediaș	34	10	6	18	36	51	−15	36	Spared from relegation
16	Farul Constanța (R)	34	8	6	20	27	56	−29	30	Relegation to Liga II
17	Otopeni (R)	34	5	7	22	32	54	−22	22	Relegation to Liga II
18	Gloria Buzău (R)	34	4	5	25	23	62	−39	17	Relegation to Liga II

Source: LPF (in Romanian)
Rules for classification: 1) points; 2) head-to-head points; 3) head-to-head goal difference; 4) head-to-head goals scored; 5) goal difference; 6) number of goals scored.
(C) Champions; (R) Relegated

=== Positions by round ===
Team ╲ Round	1	2	3	4	5	6	7	8	9	10	11	12	13	14	15	16	17	18	19	20	21	22	23	24	25	26	27	28	29	30	31	32	33	34
Argeș Pitești	9	13	10	14	14	13	11	12	9	9	7	5	8	6	7	4	8	8	10	11	10	10	10	10	10	10	10	10	10	10	10	10	10	10
Brașov	4	8	12	11	11	8	5	6	6	6	9	10	10	9	11	10	11	11	11	9	9	9	9	8	9	9	8	8	8	8	9	9	9	9
CFR Cluj	1	1	5	7	8	10	8	5	5	5	5	7	5	7	3	6	4	4	4	4	5	4	4	4	4	4	4	5	5	6	4	4	4	4
Universitatea Craiova	3	8	8	9	9	9	12	10	10	10	8	5	6	3	4	3	6	7	7	7	6	5	5	5	5	5	5	6	6	5	6	5	5	7
Dinamo București	9	6	4	1	4	3	3	2	1	1	1	1	1	1	2	2	1	1	1	1	1	1	1	1	1	1	1	1	1	1	1	2	2	3
Farul Constanța	4	12	13	12	12	6	7	11	12	14	14	12	13	15	15	14	14	12	13	13	15	15	15	15	15	16	16	16	16	16	16	16	16	16
Gaz Metan Mediaș	7	14	9	13	13	14	13	13	14	13	13	14	14	13	14	16	16	16	16	16	16	16	16	16	16	15	15	13	14	15	15	15	15	15
Gloria Bistrița	17	11	14	10	10	12	14	14	15	16	17	15	16	14	13	13	12	13	12	12	12	13	12	13	13	13	13	14	13	13	13	13	13	13
Gloria Buzău	13	16	16	17	17	17	17	17	18	18	18	18	18	18	18	18	18	18	18	18	18	18	18	18	18	18	18	18	18	18	18	18	18	18
Otopeni	18	18	18	18	18	18	18	18	16	17	16	16	17	17	17	17	17	17	17	17	17	17	17	17	17	17	17	17	17	17	17	17	17	17
Oțelul Galați	7	5	3	1	5	7	10	9	8	8	6	9	9	11	10	11	10	9	8	10	11	11	11	11	11	11	11	12	12	12	12	12	11	12
Pandurii Târgu Jiu	9	15	15	15	15	15	15	15	13	12	12	13	12	12	12	12	13	14	14	14	13	14	13	12	12	12	12	11	11	11	11	11	12	11
Politehnica Iași	16	17	17	16	16	16	16	16	17	15	15	17	15	16	15	15	15	15	15	15	14	12	14	14	14	14	14	15	15	14	14	14	14	14
Rapid București	2	2	1	4	2	5	6	8	11	11	10	8	7	8	8	8	7	5	5	5	3	6	7	6	6	7	7	7	7	7	5	6	7	8
Steaua București	13	8	7	5	6	4	2	1	3	2	3	4	4	4	5	5	4	6	6	6	8	7	8	7	7	6	6	4	4	4	7	7	6	6
Timișoara	9	4	11	8	7	11	9	7	4	4	4	3	3	5	6	7	3	3	3	3	4	3	3	2	3	3	3	3	3	3	3	3	3	2
Unirea Urziceni	13	7	6	3	1	1	1	3	2	3	2	2	2	2	1	1	2	2	2	2	2	2	2	3	2	2	2	2	2	2	2	1	1	1
Vaslui	4	3	2	6	3	2	4	4	7	7	11	11	11	10	9	9	9	10	9	8	7	8	6	9	8	8	9	9	9	9	8	8	8	5

Source: kicker.de (in German)
= Leaders; Liga I; = 2nd place; Liga I; = 3rd place; Liga I

== Results ==
Home \ Away	ARG	BRA	CFR	UCR	DIN	FAR	GAZ	GBI	GBU	OTO	OȚE	PAN	PIA	RAP	STE	TIM	URZ	VAS
Argeș Pitești	—	1–0	0–2	1–1	5–2	3–0	2–0	2–1	1–1	1–1	3–2	2–1	3–0	1–0	2–2	1–1	0–0	0–0
Brașov	1–0	—	1–1	1–1	2–0	2–1	2–1	0–0	4–0	2–0	1–1	2–1	2–0	0–0	1–0	1–0	1–0	0–0
CFR Cluj	2–0	2–0	—	1–1	1–0	3–0	2–1	2–2	2–0	1–0	1–1	1–1	0–0	0–0	1–1	2–0	1–0	3–0
Universitatea Craiova	1–0	0–0	4–1	—	2–0	3–2	2–0	0–0	1–1	2–2	1–0	2–0	2–0	0–0	0–0	1–3	0–0	0–1
Dinamo București	2–0	0–2	1–0	1–0	—	1–0	1–0	5–0	4–1	0–0	1–0	3–0	2–0	3–0	1–1	3–1	0–1	4–1
Farul Constanța	2–0	1–1	0–1	0–3	1–4	—	2–0	2–1	2–0	1–0	1–1	1–1	0–3	0–2	1–4	1–1	0–1	1–0
Gaz Metan Mediaș	2–2	0–0	2–0	2–5	1–1	0–1	—	3–1	2–0	3–0	2–2	2–1	1–0	1–0	0–1	5–1	1–0	1–2
Gloria Bistrița	2–0	1–0	1–2	2–0	1–2	1–0	1–0	—	2–0	3–1	3–0	1–0	3–1	1–3	2–2	0–1	0–1	0–3
Gloria Buzău	3–1	0–2	0–1	0–2	1–3	0–1	1–2	2–1	—	0–1	0–2	0–1	1–1	0–1	0–1	1–2	1–5	4–1
Otopeni	1–2	2–2	0–4	0–1	2–3	6–0	2–0	0–1	2–0	—	0–1	0–1	4–1	1–2	0–1	2–2	1–2	0–2
Oțelul Galați	2–0	2–1	1–1	0–2	0–1	2–0	3–1	1–0	1–2	3–1	—	0–0	3–2	2–1	2–0	2–2	0–2	0–1
Pandurii Târgu Jiu	3–1	0–0	2–1	1–0	1–1	0–0	1–0	1–1	1–0	1–1	1–0	—	1–1	2–0	2–0	0–1	1–5	1–0
Politehnica Iași	4–0	1–1	0–1	1–0	1–0	2–1	2–0	1–0	1–1	2–0	2–1	1–1	—	1–2	0–2	0–2	0–2	1–3
Rapid București	1–3	3–1	1–0	0–3	2–1	1–0	4–2	3–0	1–0	3–0	4–0	2–0	2–2	—	0–0	0–2	1–2	2–2
Steaua București	2–0	2–1	1–1	2–1	1–1	1–1	4–0	1–0	1–1	1–1	5–0	1–0	1–0	1–2	—	2–2	1–0	1–1
Timișoara	2–1	4–0	2–1	1–0	0–3	3–2	0–0	1–0	4–1	3–1	1–0	3–0	3–0	1–0	1–0	—	1–2	3–1
Unirea Urziceni	3–2	0–0	1–1	1–2	1–0	1–0	4–0	3–0	2–1	1–0	3–1	2–0	0–1	1–1	1–1	1–1	—	1–0
Vaslui	0–1	0–1	2–1	1–1	1–2	4–2	1–1	1–0	3–0	2–0	2–1	1–0	2–0	1–0	1–0	4–3	0–2	—

Source: LPF (in Romanian)
Legend: Blue = home team win; Yellow = draw; Red = away team win.

== Top goalscorers ==
Rank	Player	Club	Goals
1	(Romania) Florin Costea	Universitatea Craiova	17
1	(Romania) Gheorghe Bucur	Timișoara	17
3	(Brazil) Spadacio	Rapid București	16
4	(Romania) Ionel Dănciulescu	Dinamo București	12
4	(Romania) Marius Niculae	Dinamo București	12
6	(Greece) Pantelis Kapetanos	Steaua București	11
6	(Romania) Bogdan Stancu	Steaua București	11
8	(Burkina Faso) Yssouf Koné	CFR Cluj	10
9	(Romania) Gabriel Paraschiv	Oțelul Galați	9
10	(Romania) Alexandru Curtean	Gaz Metan Mediaș / Timișoara	8
10	(Zimbabwe) Mike Temwanjera	Vaslui	8
10	(Portugal) Chico	Farul Constanța	8
10	(Romania) Marius Onofraș	Unirea Urziceni	8
10	(Romania) Marius Bilașco	Unirea Urziceni	8
10	(Romania) Romeo Surdu	Brașov	8
10	(Romania) Cristian Bud	Gaz Metan Mediaș	8

Source: Liga1.ro (in Romanian)

== Champion squad ==
Unirea Urziceni

Goalkeepers: Giedrius Arlauskis (Lithuania) (30 / 0); Cătălin Grigore (2 / 0); Daniel Tudor (2 / 0).
Defenders: Valeriu Bordeanu (30 / 0); Pablo Brandán (Argentina) (26 / 1); George Galamaz (32 / 4); Ersin Mehmedović (Serbia) (18 / 0); Bruno Fernandes (Guinea-Bissau) (19 / 0); Epaminonda Nicu (30 / 0).
Midfielders: Iulian Apostol (28 / 2); Tiberiu Bălan (25 / 4); George Bârlădeanu (2 / 0); Jacob Burns (Australia) (10 / 0); Sorin Frunză (25 / 1); Răzvan Pădurețu (31 / 3); Ricardo Vilana (Brazil) (20 / 1); Dinu Todoran (22 / 2); Dacian Varga (14 / 4).
Forwards: Bogdan Aldea (1 / 0); Marius Bilașco (27 / 8); Cristian Dănălache (20 / 3); Bogdan Mara (17 / 5); Marius Onofraș (22 / 8); Raul Rusescu (23 / 5).
(league appearances and goals listed in brackets)

Manager: Dan Petrescu.

== Season statistics ==
=== Scoring ===
- First goal of the season: Andrei Prepeliță for Craiova against Iași, 64 minutes (Round 1 – 26 July 2008)
- Last goal of the season: Claudiu Niculescu for Dinamo against Argeș, 90+3 minutes (Round 34 – 10 June 2009)
- Fastest goal in a match: Andrei Cristea for Iași against Pandurii, 10 seconds (Round 30 – 9 May 2009)
- Fastest two goals in a match: Pandurii 1–1 Bistrița, minutes 2 and 4 seconds (Round 14 – 8 November 2008)
- Goal scored at the latest point in a match: Cristian Oroș for Brașov against Unirea, 90+4 minutes (Round 1 – 26 July 2008)
- First own goal of the season: Zhivko Zhelev (Oțelul) for Gaz Metan, 31 minutes (Round 1 – 27 July 2008)
- Two own goals by the same team in a match: Diogo and Alexandru Tudose (both Buzău) for CFR, minutes 14 and 79 (Round 2 – 3 August 2008)
- Two goals in one minute and one second: Farul 1–1 Brașov, between 5:53 and 6:54 (Round 13 – 1 November 2008)
- Three goals in three minutes: Farul 1–4 Steaua, minutes 89, 90 and 90+2 (Round 7 – 13 September 2008)
- Six goals in 30 minutes: Gaz Metan 5–1 Timișoara, minutes 60 through 90 (Round 3 – 9 August 2008)
- Most goals in one half: Gaz Metan 0–0 at half time, 5–1 final Timișoara (Round 3 – 9 August 2008)
- Widest winning margin: Otopeni 6–0 Farul (Round 34 – 10 June 2009)
- Hattricks scored: 4
  - Alexandru Curtean for Gaz Metan against Timișoara, minutes 65, 75 and 81 (Round 3 – 9 August 2008)
  - Marius Niculae for Dinamo against Vaslui, minutes 24, 78 and 90 (Round 24 – 11 April 2009)
  - Marius Niculae for Dinamo against Bistrița, minutes 20, 56 and 72 (Round 26 – 21 April 2009)
  - Victoraș Iacob for Otopeni against Farul, minutes 4, 34 and 50 (Round 34 – 10 June 2009)

=== Cards ===
- First yellow card: Attila Hadnagy for Brașov against Unirea, 19 minutes (Round 1 – 26 July 2008)
- First red card: Rafael Pereira for Gaz Metan against Dinamo, 22 minutes (Round 2 – 3 August 2008)
- Most red cards in a single match: 3
  - Dinamo 1–0 Craiova – 2 for Dinamo (Júlio César, Adrian Ropotan) and 1 for Craiova (Josh Mitchell) (Round 6 – 30 August 2008)
  - Argeș 1–1 Craiova – 2 for Craiova (Mircea Bornescu, Michael Baird) and 1 for Argeș (Daniel Bălașa) (Round 10 – 3 October 2008)
- Match without any cards: Unirea 1–1 Steaua (Round 34 – 10 June 2009)

== Attendances ==
#	Club	Average
1	Timișoara	13,956
2	Steaua	11,485
3	Craiova	10,706
4	CFR Cluj	9,121
5	Dinamo 1948	6,412
6	Iași	6,176
7	FC Rapid	5,706
8	Vaslui	5,324
9	Brașov	5,171
10	Buzău	5,088
11	Pandurii	5,059
12	Oțelul	5,029
13	Unirea	4,335
14	Gaz Metan	4,135
15	Argeș	3,771
16	Bistriţa	3,447
17	Farul	2,076
18	Otopeni	1,788
