= Gheorghe Bucur =

Romanian footballer

Gigel Bucur
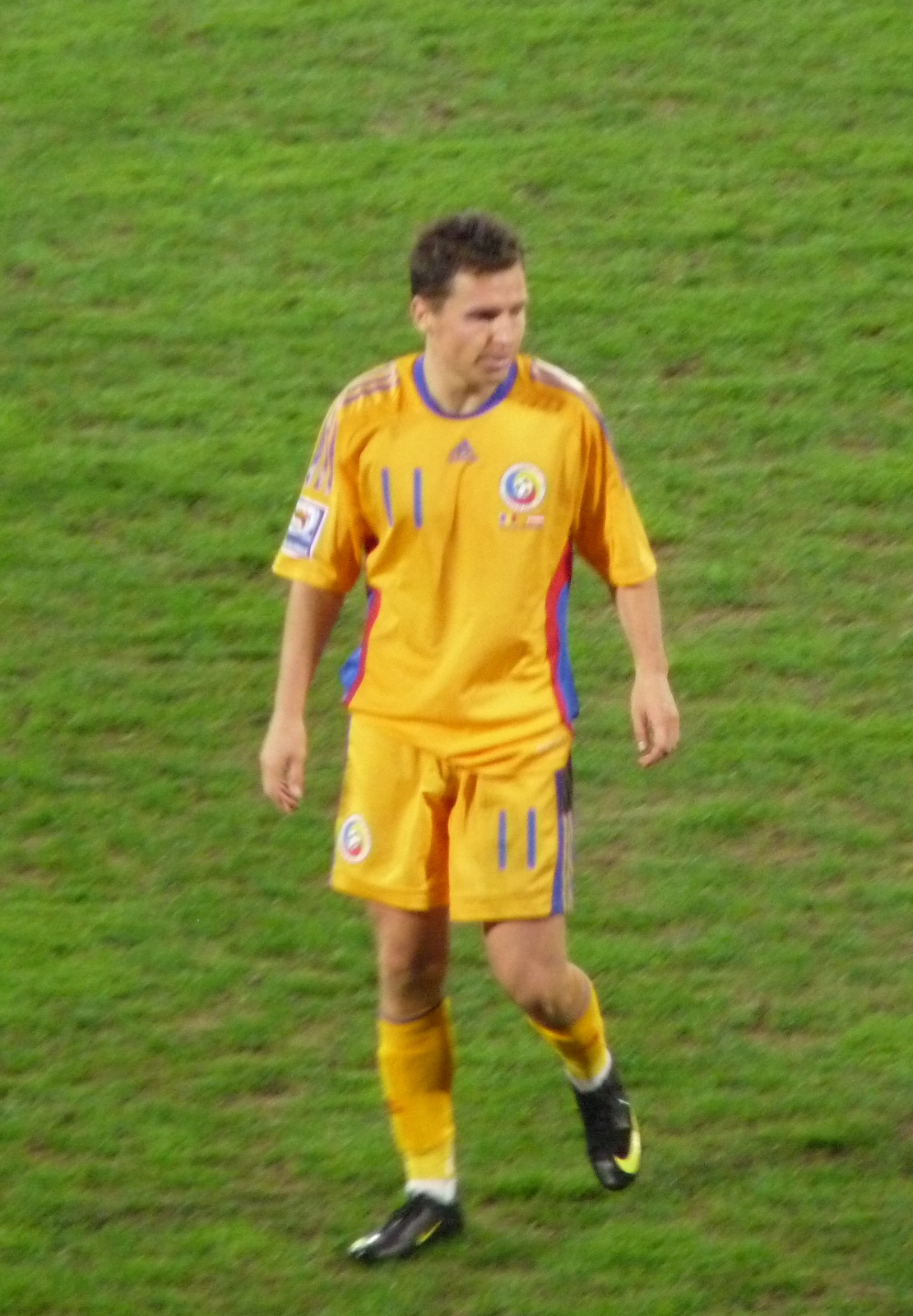
- Bucur playing for Romania in 2009

Personal information
- Date of birth: 8 April 1980 (age 46)
- Place of birth: Cernica, Romania
- Height: 1.71 m (5 ft 7 in)
- Positions: Winger; striker

Youth career
- 1989–1998: Sportul Studențesc

Senior career*
Years	Team	Apps	(Gls)
1998–2005	Sportul Studențesc	170	(77)
2005–2009	Politehnica Timișoara	124	(53)
2010–2016	Kuban Krasnodar	156	(28)
2017	Sportul Studențesc		
Total		450	(158)

International career
2001	Romania U21	3	(3)
2005–2013	Romania	26	(4)
- * Club domestic league appearances and goals

Gheorghe "Gigel" Bucur (born 8 April 1980) is a Romanian former professional footballer who played as a winger or a striker.

Bucur won the top scorer award in the Romanian league twice, in the 2004–05 and 2008–09 seasons. He shared the award both times, first with Claudiu Niculescu and then with Florin Costea.

== Club career ==
=== Sportul Studențesc ===
Bucur was born on 8 April 1980 in Cernica, Romania and began playing junior-level football at the age of nine at Sportul Studențesc under coach Nicolae Mocanu and later Cornel Jurcă. He started his senior career at the club during the 1998–99 Divizia B season. He helped Sportul gain promotion to the first league by scoring four goals in the 2000–01 season. Subsequently, Bucur made his Divizia A debut on 3 August 2001 under coach Ioan Andone in a 3–0 victory against Petrolul Ploiești. About two weeks later, he scored his first goals in the competition, managing a brace in a 3–1 win over Ceahlăul Piatra Neamț. At the end of the 2002–03 season, the team suffered relegation. However, he stayed with the club, forming a prolific offensive partnership with Ionuț Mazilu, with Bucur scoring 29 goals in the 2003–04 season to help Sportul gain promotion back to the first league. In the next season, he scored 21 goals, including three hat-tricks in victories against Apulum Alba Iulia, Oțelul Galați and Gloria Bistrița, sharing the Divizia A top-scorer title with Claudiu Niculescu.

=== Politehnica Timișoara ===
In 2005, Bucur along with teammate Sorin Rădoi transferred from Sportul to Politehnica Timișoara, which paid $800,000 for Bucur's transfer. In the 2006–07 season, he helped the team reach the Cupa României final, where coach Valentin Velcea used him the entire match in the 2–0 loss to Rapid București. On 1 September 2007, Bucur netted a hat-trick in a 3–2 West derby victory against UTA Arad, after also scoring in the previous meeting that ended in a 2–1 loss. He made his debut in European competitions by playing in both legs of the 3–1 aggregate loss to Partizan Belgrade in the first round of the 2008–09 UEFA Cup, scoring his side's goal. Domestically, during the same season, he helped Politehnica finish runner-up in the championship by scoring 17 goals which made him the league top-scorer alongside Florin Costea. The team also reached the 2009 Cupa României final, where he played the full 90 minutes under Velcea in the 3–0 loss to CFR Cluj. Subsequently, Bucur scored two goals as Politehnica eliminated UEFA Cup holders Shakhtar Donetsk in the third round of the 2009–10 Champions League via the away goals rule following a 2–2 aggregate draw. They were eliminated by VfB Stuttgart in the next round, before reaching the Europa League group stage, where Bucur scored once in a 2–1 victory against Dinamo Zagreb. Bucur made his last Liga I appearance on 13 December 2009 in a 1–0 loss to FC Brașov, totaling 195 matches with 89 goals in the competition. For the way he played in 2009, Bucur was placed fifth in the ranking for the Romanian Footballer of the Year award.

=== Kuban Krasnodar ===
On 3 February 2010, Bucur was transferred from Politehnica to Russian second-tier club Kuban Krasnodar for a €1.8 million fee. Under his former Sportul Studențesc coach Dan Petrescu, he helped the team gain promotion to the first league by scoring nine times during the 2010 season, including the goal in a 1–0 victory against Zhemchuzhina-Sochi that mathematically secured the promotion. Subsequently, Bucur made his Russian Premier League debut on 20 March 2011, when he came on in the 57th minute to replace Dacian Varga in a 1–0 away win over Tom Tomsk. He scored his first goal in the competition on 20 May in a 1–1 draw against Spartak Nalchik. On 26 June, he netted a spectacular goal in a 2–0 success over Rubin Kazan by collecting the ball 16 meters out, driving into the box, chipping it over a defender, and unleashing a powerful strike beneath the crossbar. The Sport Express newspaper subsequently named the effort Russian football's "Goal of the Year" for 2011. Under coach Dorinel Munteanu, Bucur scored a goal to help Kuban eliminate Feyenoord in the 2013–14 Europa League play-off, reaching the group stage. On 28 October 2013, he netted a double in a 2–0 win over Anzhi Makhachkala. Bucur later helped the team reach the 2016 Russian Cup final, where coach Leonid Kuchuk sent him in the 80th minute to replace Sergei Tkachyov in the 3–1 extra-time loss to Lokomotiv Moscow. On 21 May 2016, he made his last Russian Premier League appearance in a 2–0 loss to Ural Yekaterinburg, having accumulated a total of 125 matches and 19 goals in the competition. Afterwards, he played in a promotion/relegation play-off which Kuban lost to Tom Tomsk. Throughout his tenure at Kuban, Bucur featured in the club's attacking unit alongside several high-profile forwards at different stages, including Lacina Traoré, compatriot Daniel Niculae, and Djibril Cissé.

=== Return to Sportul Studențesc ===
Bucur returned to his first club, Sportul Studențesc, and retired there in 2017 after a final stint in the fourth league.

== International career ==
Bucur played 26 matches and scored four goals for Romania, making his debut on 9 February 2005, when coach Victor Pițurcă sent him in the 70th minute to replace Daniel Niculae in a 2–2 friendly draw against Slovakia. Subsequently, he made four appearances during the 2006 World Cup qualifiers, scoring a brace in a 3–0 win against Armenia.

Bucur played in a 6–1 home victory over Albania in the successful Euro 2008 qualifiers. On 25 March 2008, he was decorated by the president of Romania, Traian Băsescu, with the Ordinul "Meritul Sportiv" – (The Medal of "Sportive Merit") Class III for his performance in those qualifiers. However, coach Pițurcă did not select him to be part of the squad that participated in the final tournament.

He played seven games during the 2010 World Cup qualifiers, scoring a goal in a 1–1 draw against Austria and adding another one in a 3–1 triumph over the Faroe Islands. Afterwards, he made three goalless appearances in the Euro 2012 qualifiers. Bucur's last matches for the national team took place during the 2014 World Cup qualifiers in a loss to Turkey and a win over Estonia.

== Career statistics ==
=== Club ===
Appearances and goals by club, season and competition
Club	Season	League			Cup		Continental		Other		Total	
Club	Season	Division	Apps	Goals	Apps	Goals	Apps	Goals	Apps	Goals	Apps	Goals
Sportul Studențesc	1998–99	Divizia B	16	2	0	0	–		–		16	2
Sportul Studențesc	1999–2000	Divizia B	28	6	0	0	–		–		28	6
Sportul Studențesc	2000–01	Divizia B	27	4	5	1	–		–		32	5
Sportul Studențesc	2001–02	Divizia A	29	13	2	1	–		–		31	14
Sportul Studențesc	2002–03	Divizia A	13	2	0	0	–		–		13	2
Sportul Studențesc	2003–04	Divizia B	28	29	0	0	–		–		28	29
Sportul Studențesc	2004–05	Divizia A	29	21	2	1	–		–		31	22
Sportul Studențesc	Total		170	77	9	3	–		–		179	80
Politehnica Timișoara	2005–06	Divizia A	20	3	2	1	–		–		22	3
Politehnica Timișoara	2006–07	Liga I	29	9	4	2	–		–		33	11
Politehnica Timișoara	2007–08	Liga I	28	16	2	1	–		–		30	17
Politehnica Timișoara	2008–09	Liga I	31	17	4	2	2 (Note: Appearances in UEFA Cup)	1	–		37	20
Politehnica Timișoara	2009–10	Liga I	16	8	0	0	10 (Note: Four appearances in UEFA Champions League and two goals, six appearances and one goal in UEFA Europa League)	3	–		26	11
Politehnica Timișoara	Total		124	53	12	6	12	4	–		148	63
Kuban Krasnodar	2010	Russian First Division	31	9	–		–		–		31	9
Kuban Krasnodar	2011–12	Russian Premier League	39	6	1	0	–		–		40	6
Kuban Krasnodar	2012–13	Russian Premier League	21	4	2	0	–		–		23	4
Kuban Krasnodar	2013–14	Russian Premier League	28	6	0	0	6 (Note: Appearances in UEFA Europa League)	1	–		34	7
Kuban Krasnodar	2014–15	Russian Premier League	24	3	3	0	–		–		27	3
Kuban Krasnodar	2015–16	Russian Premier League	13	0	1	0	–		2 (Note: Appearances in Russian Premier League promotion/relegation play-offs)	0	16	0
Kuban Krasnodar	Total		156	28	7	0	6	1	2	0	171	29
Career total			450	158	28	9	18	5	2	0	498	172

=== International ===
Appearances and goals by national team and year
National team	Year	Apps	Goals
Romania	2005	5	2
Romania	2006	0	0
Romania	2007	2	0
Romania	2008	3	0
Romania	2009	8	2
Romania	2010	1	0
Romania	2011	5	0
Romania	2012	0	0
Romania	2013	2	0
Total		26	4

Scores and results list Romania's goal tally first

List of international goals scored by Gheorghe Bucur
#	Date	Venue	Opponent	Score	Result	Competition
1	8 June 2005	Stadionul Farul, Constanța, Romania	Armenia	2–0	3–0	2006 FIFA World Cup qualification
2	8 June 2005	Stadionul Farul, Constanța, Romania	Armenia	3–0	3–0	2006 FIFA World Cup qualification
3	9 September 2009	Stadionul Steaua, Bucharest, Romania	Austria	1–0	1–1	2010 FIFA World Cup qualification
4	14 October 2009	Stadionul Ceahlăul, Piatra Neamț, Romania	Faroe Islands	2–0	3–1	2010 FIFA World Cup qualification

== Honours ==
Sportul Studențesc

- Divizia B: 2000–01, 2003–04

Politehnica Timișoara

- Liga I runner-up: 2008–09
- Cupa României runner-up: 2006–07, 2008–09

Kuban Krasnodar

- Russian First Division: 2010
- Russian Cup runner-up: 2014–15

Individual

- Liga I top scorer: 2004–05 (21 goals, joint with Claudiu Niculescu), 2008–09 (17 goals, joint with Florin Costea)
- Divizia B top scorer: 2003–04 (29 goals)
- Romanian Footballer of the Year (fifth place): 2009
