= Mihai Roman =

Romanian footballer

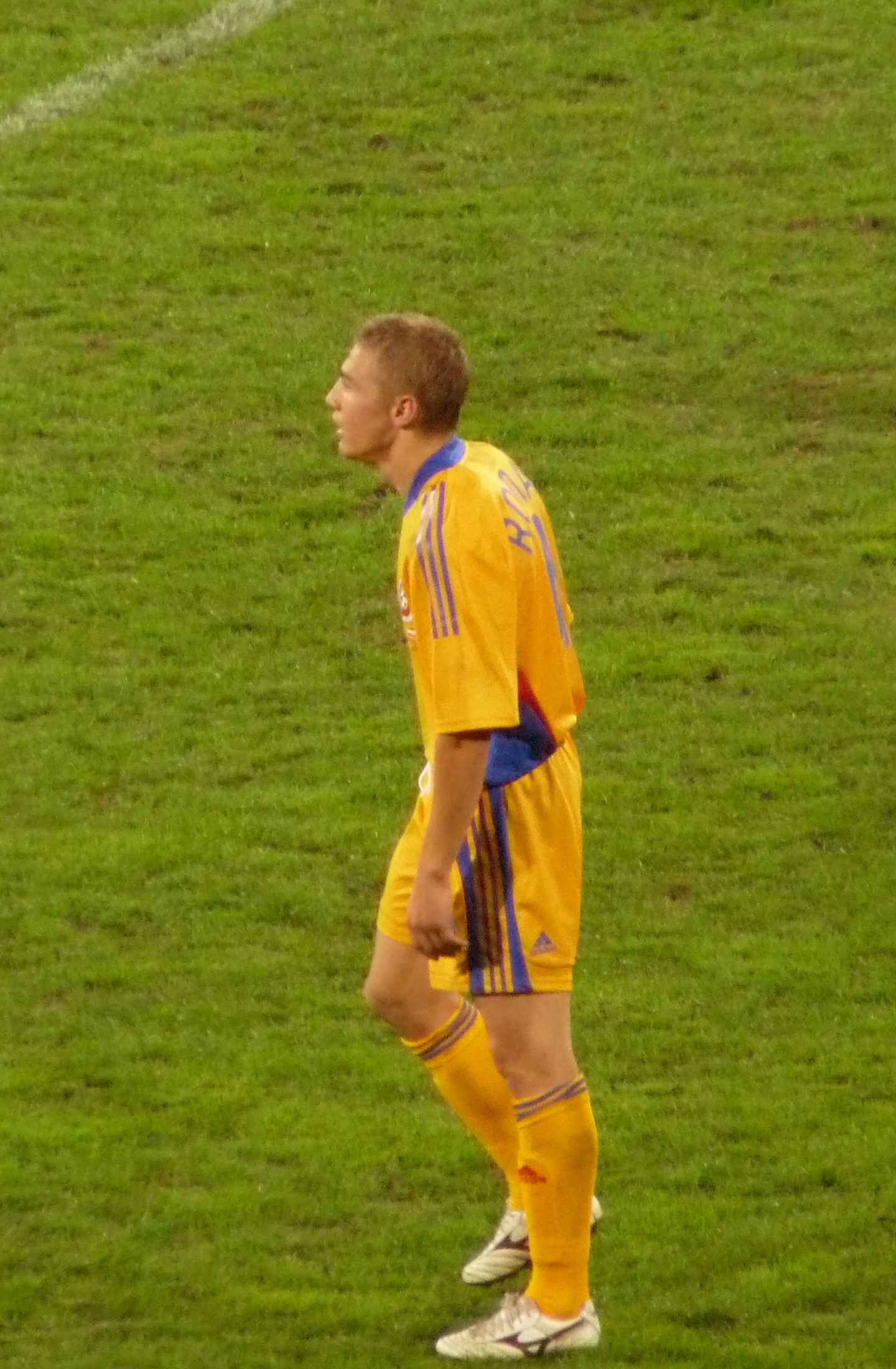
- Roman playing for Romania

Personal information
- Date of birth: 16 October 1984 (age 42)
- Place of birth: Suceava, Romania
- Height: 1.75 m (5 ft 9 in)
- Position: Winger

Team information
- Current team: Botoșani (team manager)

Senior career*
Years	Team	Apps	(Gls)
1999–2000	Bradul Putna		
2000–2005	Bucovina Rădăuți		
2005–2007	Cetatea Suceava	54	(14)
2007–2010	FC Brașov	84	(10)
2010–2013	Rapid București	83	(8)
2013–2016	Toulouse	5	(0)
2014–2016	Toulouse B	13	(4)
2016–2018	Botoșani	67	(15)
2018–2020	FCSB	20	(1)
2019–2020	→ Botoșani (loan)	14	(4)
2020–2023	Botoșani	68	(4)
Total		408	(60)

International career
2009–2012	Romania	10	(0)

Managerial career
- 2023–: Botoșani (team manager)
- * Club domestic league appearances and goals

Mihai Roman (born 16 October 1984) is a Romanian former professional footballer who played as a winger.

== Club career ==
Roman started his football career at the age of 17. He made his way up by being a hard worker, and with the help of Razvan Lucescu, his former coach from FC Brașov. Before signing for Braşov, Roman was linked with other Liga I clubs such as FC Vaslui and Oţelul Galaţi. After two great seasons there, he received his first call-up for the Romania national team in June 2009.

On 27 June 2010, Roman signed for Rapid București together with his teammate Sabrin Sburlea. On 29 May 2013, Roman signed for Ligue 1 club Toulouse FC on a free transfer for three seasons.

=== FCSB ===
On 20 August 2018, Mihai Roman signed a two-year contract with FCSB. On 23 August, he got his first cap for FCSB, in a UEFA Europa League play-off against Rapid Wien. On 30 August, he scored his first goal in the Europa League for the club in the second leg against Rapid on Arena Națională, a 2–1 win. On 16 September, Mihai Roman made his debut for FCSB in Liga I against CFR Cluj, which finished 1–1.

== International career ==
Roman made his debut for the Romania national team in a 2010 FIFA World Cup qualification game on 6 June 2009, against Lithuania.

== Career statistics ==
=== Club ===
Appearances and goals by club, season and competition
Club	Season	League			National cup (Note: Includes Cupa României)		League cup (Note: Includes Cupa Ligii)		Europe		Other		Total	
Club	Season	Division	Apps	Goals	Apps	Goals	Apps	Goals	Apps	Goals	Apps	Goals	Apps	Goals
Cetatea Suceava	2005–06	Divizia B	22	5	0	0	—		—		—		22	5
Cetatea Suceava	2006–07	Liga II	32	9	0	0	—		—		—		32	9
Cetatea Suceava	Total		54	14	0	0	—		—		—		54	14
Brașov	2007–08	Liga II	28	4	1	0	—		—		—		29	4
Brașov	2008–09	Liga I	31	3	0	0	—		—		—		31	3
Brașov	2009–10	Liga I	25	3	3	0	—		—		—		28	3
Brașov	Total		84	10	4	0	—		—		—		88	10
Rapid București	2010–11	Liga I	29	4	3	0	—		—		—		32	4
Rapid București	2011–12	Liga I	28	3	4	3	—		6 (Note: Appearances in UEFA Europa League)	1	—		38	7
Rapid București	2012–13	Liga I	26	1	3	0	—		3	0	—		32	1
Rapid București	Total		83	8	10	3	—		9	1	—		102	12
Toulouse	2013–14	Ligue 1	5	0	0	0	0	0	—		—		5	0
Toulouse	2014–15	Ligue 1	0	0	0	0	0	0	—		—		0	0
Toulouse	2015–16	Ligue 1	0	0	0	0	0	0	—		—		0	0
Toulouse	Total		5	0	0	0	0	0	—		—		5	0
Toulouse B	2013–14	CFA 2	2	4	0	0	—		—		—		2	4
Toulouse B	2014–15	CFA 2	6	0	0	0	—		—		—		6	0
Toulouse B	2015–16	CFA 2	5	0	0	0	—		—		—		5	0
Toulouse B	Total		13	4	0	0	—		—		—		13	4
Botoșani	2016–17	Liga I	30	4	0	0	2	0	—		—		32	4
Botoșani	2017–18	Liga I	33	11	5	2	—		—		—		38	13
Botoșani	2018–19	Liga I	4	0	—		—		—		—		4	0
Botoșani	Total		67	15	5	2	2	0	—		—		74	17
FCSB	2018–19	Liga I	16	1	2	0	—		2	1	—		20	2
FCSB	2019–20	Liga I	4	0	0	0	—		4	0	—		8	0
FCSB	Total		20	1	2	0	—		6	1	—		28	2
Botoșani (loan)	2019–20	Liga I	14	4	0	0	—		—		—		14	4
Botoșani	2020–21	Liga I	29	2	1	0	—		2	0	—		32	2
Botoșani	2021–22	Liga I	21	2	—		—		—		—		21	2
Botoșani	2022–23	Liga I	18	0	0	0	—		—		—		18	0
Botoșani	Total		82	8	1	0	—		2	0	—		85	8
Career total			408	60	22	5	2	0	17	2	0	0	449	67

=== International ===
Appearances and goals by national team and year
National team	Year	Apps	Goals
Romania
Romania	2009	5	0
Romania	2010	3	0
Romania	2011	1	0
Romania	2012	1	0
Total		10	0

== Honours ==
Bucovina Rădăuți

- Divizia D – Suceava County: 2000–01

FC Brașov

- Liga II: 2007–08

Rapid București

- Cupa României runner-up: 2011–12
