= Bârlădeanu =

Bârlădeanu or Bîrlădeanu is a Romanian surname. It is a toponymic surname, derived from Bârlad, and can refer to:

- Alexandru Bârlădeanu (1911–1997), a Romanian economist and politician
- Corneliu Bârlădeanu (born 1966), a Romanian orthodox bishop
- George Bârlădeanu (born 1988), a Romanian soccer player
- Ion Bîrlădeanu (born 1958), a Romanian sprint canoer
- Ion Bîrlădeanu, sometimes spelled Bârlădeanu (1946–2021), a Romanian collage artist
- Monica Bârlădeanu (born 1978), a Romanian actress
