= Sabrin Sburlea =

Romanian footballer

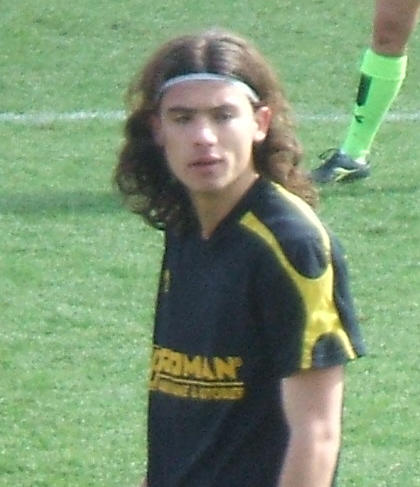
- Sburlea while playing for Brașov

Personal information
- Date of birth: 12 May 1989 (age 37)
- Place of birth: Sânnicolau Mare, Romania
- Height: 1.85 m (6 ft 1 in)
- Position: Forward

Youth career
- 1999–2004: Unirea Sânnicolau Mare
- 2004–2006: Școala de Fotbal Gheorghe Popescu

Senior career*
Years	Team	Apps	(Gls)
2006–2010	Brașov	108	(26)
2010–2012	Rapid București	39	(3)
2012–2013	Vaslui	14	(2)
2015	Hansa Rostock	14	(1)
2015–2016	SSVg Velbert	13	(1)
2016–2017	Brașov	25	(6)
2017–2024	TSV Berg	38	(13)
Total		251	(52)

International career
2008	Romania U19	2	(0)
2008–2010	Romania U21	11	(2)
2011	Romania	1	(0)
- * Club domestic league appearances and goals

Sabrin Sburlea (born 12 May 1989) is a Romanian former professional footballer who played as a forward.

== Club career ==
Sburlea was born on 12 May 1989 in Sânnicolau Mare, Timiș County, Romania and began playing junior-level football in 1999 at local club Unirea, five years later moving to Școala de Fotbal Gheorghe Popescu. In 2006, he started his senior career at Liga II club, Brașov. He helped the team finish first in the 2007–08 Liga II season by scoring 16 goals. Subsequently, he made his Liga I debut on 26 July 2008 when coach Răzvan Lucescu sent him to replace Attila Hadnagy in the 53rd minute of a 1–0 home victory against Unirea Urziceni. Sburlea scored his first goal in the competition on 16 August when he netted the victory goal in a 2–1 win over Pandurii Târgu Jiu.

In 2010, Rapid București paid €372,000 to Brașov for him, being transferred alongside Mihai Roman. He scored his first goal for Rapid on 19 November in a 3–0 win over Universitatea Cluj. Until the end of the season he scored in two 1–0 wins against Unirea Urziceni and Brașov.

In 2012, Sburlea switched teams again, going to Vaslui for a transfer fee of €100,000. During this spell he scored his last two Liga I goals in two 3–0 victories against Petrolul Ploiești and Gloria Bistrița. He made his last appearance in the competition on 5 August 2013 in a 4–0 home loss to CFR Cluj, totaling 106 matches with 14 goals scored.

On 29 January 2015, Sburlea signed for German 3. Liga side Hansa Rostock until the end of the season. In the following years he went to SSVg Velbert, then made a comeback to Brașov in Liga II, ending his career in 2024 in the lower leagues of Germany at TSV Berg.

== International career ==
Sburlea played one game for Romania, being used on 8 February 2011 by coach Răzvan Lucescu until the 68th minute when he got replaced with Liviu Ganea in a 2–2 (2–4, after penalty kicks) loss against Ukraine in the friendly Cyprus International Football Tournament.

== Honours ==
Brașov

- Liga II: 2007–08
