= Jieț =

Jieț may refer to the following places in Romania:

- Jieț (Jiu), a tributary of the river Jiul de Est in Hunedoara County
- Jieț (Danube), a tributary of the Danube in Dolj County
- Jieț, a village in the town Petrila, Hunedoara County
