= 2009–10 Liga I =

92nd season of top-tier football league in Romania

Liga I
- Season: 2009–10
- Champions: CFR Cluj
- Relegated: Internațional; Politehnica Iași; Ceahlăul Piatra Neamț; Unirea Alba Iulia
- Champions League: CFR Cluj; Unirea Urziceni
- Europa League: Vaslui; Steaua București; Timișoara; Dinamo București
- Matches: 306
- Goals: 711 (2.32 per match)
- Top goalscorer: Andrei Cristea (16)
- Biggest home win: Timișoara 6–0 Ceahlăul; Timișoara 6–0 Unirea; Brașov 6–0 Bistrița
- Biggest away win: Gaz Metan 2–6 Timișoara; Ceahlăul 0–4 Dinamo; Ceahlăul 0–4 Rapid
- Highest scoring: Urziceni 4–4 Dinamo; Gaz Metan 2–6 Timișoara
- Longest winning run: 6 matches Vaslui
- Longest unbeaten run: 16 matches Urziceni
- Longest winless run: 14 matches Iași
- Longest losing run: 7 matches Alba Iulia

The 2009–10 Liga I was the ninety-second season of Liga I, the top-level football league of Romania. Unirea Urziceni were the defending champions.

== Teams ==
Farul Constanța, Otopeni and Gloria Buzău were relegated at the end of the 2008–09 season. They were joined by Argeș Pitești, who were demoted upon a decision of the Professional Football League on 8 July 2009, after their owner, Cornel Penescu, was found guilty of corruption. As a consequence, 15th-placed Gaz Metan Mediaș were spared relegation.

The four relegated teams were replaced by the champions and runners-up from both 2008–09 Liga II divisions. Ceahlăul Piatra Neamț and Ploiești were promoted from Seria I while Unirea Alba Iulia and Internațional Curtea de Argeș were promoted from Seria II.

Promoted team FC Ploiești were renamed FC Astra Ploiești, effective to 1 July 2009.

=== Venues ===
Timișoara	Steaua București	FC U Craiova	CFR Cluj
Dan Păltinișanu	Steaua	Ion Oblemenco	Dr. Constantin Rădulescu
Capacity: 32,972	Capacity: 28,365	Capacity: 25,252	Capacity: 23,500
Ceahlăul Piatra Neamț	Dinamo București	Internațional Curtea de Argeș (Note: Internațional Curtea de Argeș was relocated to Orășenesc Stadium from Mioveni for the first half of the season and to Nicolae Dobrin Stadium from Pitești for the second half, because Ștrand Stadium from Pitești does not meet the standards for Liga I.)	Oțelul Galați
Ceahlăul	Dinamo	Nicolae Dobrin	Oțelul
Capacity: 17,500	Capacity: 15,032	Capacity: 15,000	Capacity: 13,500
Rapid București	2009–10 Liga I (Romania) Location of Bucharest teams.		Politehnica Iași
Giulești-Valentin Stănescu	2009–10 Liga I (Romania) Location of Bucharest teams.		Emil Alexandrescu
Capacity: 11,704 (Note: Capacity of Giulești-Valentin Stănescu Stadium has been reduced from 19,100 to 11,704 due to advanced degradation of the resistance structure of the South End.)	2009–10 Liga I (Romania) Location of Bucharest teams.		Capacity: 11,390
FC Vaslui	2009–10 Liga I (Romania) Location of Bucharest teams.		Pandurii Târgu Jiu
Municipal	2009–10 Liga I (Romania) Location of Bucharest teams.		Tudor Vladimirescu
Capacity: 9,240	2009–10 Liga I (Romania) Location of Bucharest teams.		Capacity: 9,200
Astra Ploiești	2009–10 Liga I (Romania) Location of Bucharest teams.		FC Brașov
Astra	2009–10 Liga I (Romania) Location of Bucharest teams.		Silviu Ploeșteanu
Capacity: 9,000	2009–10 Liga I (Romania) Location of Bucharest teams.		Capacity: 8,800
Unirea Alba Iulia	Gloria Bistrița	Unirea Urziceni	Gaz Metan Mediaș
Cetate	Gloria	Tineretului	Gaz Metan
Capacity: 8,000 (Note: Capacity of Cetate Stadium has been reduced from 18,000 to 8,000 due to security reasons.)	Capacity: 7,800	Capacity: 7,000	Capacity: 5,300

=== Personnel and kits ===
Team	Head coach	Captain	Kit manufacturer	Shirt Sponsor
Astra Ploiești	(Romania) Marin Barbu	(Romania) Gheorghe Rohat	Adidas	InterAgro
Brașov	(Romania) Viorel Moldovan	(Romania) Robert Ilyeș	Puma	Roman
Ceahlăul Piatra Neamț	(Montenegro) Zoran Filipović	(Moldova) Eugeniu Cebotaru	Lotto	Altex
CFR Cluj	(Italy) Andrea Mandorlini	(Portugal) Cadú	Nike	Sigma Towers
Dinamo București	(Romania) Cornel Țălnar	(Romania) Marius Niculae	Nike	Orange
FC U Craiova	(Romania) Laurențiu Reghecampf	(Romania) Andrei Prepeliță	Adidas	Ediție Specială
Gaz Metan Mediaș	(Romania) Cristian Pustai	(Romania) Cristian Todea	Joma	RomGaz
Gloria Bistrița	(Romania) Marius Șumudică	(Romania) Călin Albuț	Puma	Teraplast, Aldis, Darimex
Internațional	(Romania) Ionuț Badea	(Romania) Mihai Pintilii	Adidas	Lazăr Company
Oțelul Galați	(Romania) Dorinel Munteanu	(Romania) Gabriel Paraschiv	Masita	ArcelorMittal
Pandurii Târgu Jiu	(Romania) Florin Bejinaru	(Romania) Alin Chibulcutean	Umbro	USMO
Politehnica Iași	(Romania) Dumitru Dumitriu	(Romania) Cristian Brăneț	Nike	—
Rapid București	(Romania) Ioan Andone	(Romania) Costin Lazăr	Lotto	Unibet
Steaua București	(Romania) Mihai Stoichiță	(Romania) Petre Marin	Nike	SportingBet
Timișoara	(Romania) Ioan Sabău	(Romania) Dan Alexa	Lotto	Balkan Petroleum
Unirea Alba Iulia	(Bosnia and Herzegovina) Blaž Slišković	(Romania) Răzvan Dâlbea	Lotto	Elit
Unirea Urziceni	(Israel) Ronny Levy	(Romania) George Galamaz	Givova	GreenCity
Vaslui	(Romania) Marius Lăcătuș	(Brazil) Wesley	Adidas	New Holland Agriculture

=== Managerial changes ===
Team	Outgoing manager	Manner of departure	Date of vacancy	Replaced by	Date of appointment
Brașov	(Italy) Nicolò Napoli	Sacked	July 27, 2009	(Romania) Viorel Moldovan	July 27, 2009
Astra Ploiești	(Romania) Ion Moldovan	Sacked	August 20, 2009	(Italy) Nicolò Napoli	August 20, 2009
Steaua București	(Italy) Cristiano Bergodi	Sacked	September 17, 2009	(Romania) Mihai Stoichiță	September 18, 2009
Ceahlăul Piatra Neamț	(Romania) Mihai Ionescu			(Romania) Florin Marin	
FC U Craiova	(Romania) Daniel Mogoșanu	Sacked	September 21, 2009	(Romania) Eugen Neagoe	September 21, 2009
Vaslui	(Romania) Cristian Dulca	Sacked	September 23, 2009	(Romania) Dorin Zotincă	
Vaslui	(Romania) Dorin Zotincă	Interim		(Romania) Marius Lăcătuș	September 28, 2009
Dinamo București	(Italy) Dario Bonetti	Sacked	October 2, 2009	(Romania) Marin Ion	October 2, 2009
Gloria Bistrița	(Romania) Sandu Tăbârcă	Resigned	October 18, 2009	(Romania) Florin Halagian	
Gloria Bistrița	(Romania) Florin Halagian	Interim		(Romania) Marian Pană	October 20, 2009
Dinamo București	(Romania) Marin Ion	Resigned	October 23, 2009	(Romania) Cornel Țălnar	October 24, 2009
Pandurii Târgu Jiu	(Romania) Sorin Cârțu			(Romania) Liviu Ciobotariu	
Ceahlăul Piatra Neamț	(Romania) Florin Marin			(Romania) Gheorghe Mulțescu	
Rapid București	(Romania) Viorel Hizo	Resigned	October 29, 2009	(Romania) Nicolae Manea	November 1, 2009
CFR Cluj	(Portugal) António Conceição	Sacked	November 16, 2009	(Italy) Andrea Mandorlini	November 18, 2009
FC U Craiova	(Romania) Eugen Neagoe	Sacked	December 13, 2009	(Netherlands) Mark Wotte	January 3, 2010
Internațional Curtea de Argeș	(Romania) Ștefan Stoica	Sacked	December 2009	(Romania) Ionuț Badea	December 2009
Unirea Urziceni	(Romania) Dan Petrescu	Resigned	December 26, 2009	(Israel) Ronny Levy	December 2009
Gloria Bistrița	(Romania) Marian Pană	Sacked	January, 2010	(Romania) Marius Șumudică	January 4, 2010
Ceahlăul Piatra Neamț	(Romania) Gheorghe Mulțescu	Sacked	February 27, 2010	(Montenegro) Zoran Filipović	March 3, 2010
Unirea Alba Iulia	(Romania) Adrian Falub	Sacked	March 8, 2010	(Bosnia and Herzegovina) Blaž Slišković	March 11, 2010
Pandurii Târgu Jiu	(Romania) Liviu Ciobotariu	Resigned	March 17, 2010	(Romania) Sorin Cârțu	March 17, 2010
Rapid București	(Romania) Nicolae Manea	Resigned	April 1, 2010	(Romania) Ioan Andone	April 1, 2010
Politehnica Iasi	(Romania) Petre Grigoraș	Resigned	April 15, 2010	(Romania) Dumitru Dumitriu	April 15, 2010
Astra Ploiești	(Italy) Nicolò Napoli	Sacked	April 20, 2010	(Romania) Marin Barbu	April 20, 2010
FC U Craiova	(Netherlands) Mark Wotte	Sacked		(Romania) Florin Bejinaru	May 14, 2010

== League table ==
Pos	Team	Pld	W	D	L	GF	GA	GD	Pts	Qualification or relegation
1	CFR Cluj (C)	34	20	9	5	46	23	+23	69	Qualification to Champions League group stage
2	Unirea Urziceni	34	18	12	4	53	26	+27	66	Qualification to Champions League third qualifying round
3	Vaslui	34	18	8	8	44	28	+16	62 (Note: VAS 2–1 STE; STE 2–1 VAS)	Qualification to Europa League play-off round (Note: Since 2009–10 Cupa României winners CFR Cluj and runners-up Vaslui qualified for European competitions via their league placement, the allocation of UEFA Europa League spots effectively reverted to league placement as well, with the 6th-placed team Dinamo București also qualifying.)
4	Steaua București	34	18	8	8	49	36	+13	62	Qualification to Europa League play-off round
5	Timișoara	34	15	14	5	55	27	+28	59	Qualification to Europa League third qualifying round
6	Dinamo București	34	13	14	7	48	37	+11	53	Qualification to Europa League second qualifying round
7	Rapid București	34	14	10	10	53	38	+15	52	
8	Oțelul Galați	34	14	8	12	38	38	0	50	
9	Brașov	34	12	10	12	40	30	+10	46	
10	Gaz Metan Mediaș	34	9	15	10	33	37	−4	42	
11	Gloria Bistrița	34	10	11	13	35	46	−11	41	
12	Internațional Curtea de Argeș (R)	34	10	6	18	32	49	−17	36 (Note: INT: 7 pts, 6–4; CRA: 6 pts, 4–6; AST: 4 pts, 5–5)	Relegation to Liga II (Note: Internațional were denied a licence for the 2010–11 season because they failed to meet the requirements. Pandurii Târgu Jiu as the best-placed relegated team were therefore spared from relegation.)
13	FC U Craiova	34	11	3	20	44	52	−8	36	
14	Astra Ploiești	34	8	12	14	33	45	−12	36	
15	Pandurii Târgu Jiu	34	7	13	14	19	30	−11	34	Spared from relegation
16	Politehnica Iași (R)	34	7	10	17	28	50	−22	31	Relegation to 2010–11 Liga II
17	Ceahlăul Piatra Neamț (R)	34	6	10	18	28	57	−29	28	Relegation to 2010–11 Liga II
18	Unirea Alba Iulia (R)	34	7	5	22	33	62	−29	26	Relegation to 2010–11 Liga II

Source: LPF (in Romanian)
Rules for classification: 1) points; 2) head-to-head points; 3) head-to-head goal difference; 4) head-to-head goals scored; 5) goal difference; 6) number of goals scored.
(C) Champions; (R) Relegated

=== Positions by round ===
Team ╲ Round	1	2	3	4	5	6	7	8	9	10	11	12	13	14	15	16	17	18	19	20	21	22	23	24	25	26	27	28	29	30	31	32	33	34
Astra Ploiești	12	15	16	18	13	14	11	13	14	12	14	14	15	12	14	13	12	11	11	11	11	10	10	11	11	11	13	13	13	11	12	13	13	14
Brașov	4	5	6	1	1	1	1	4	5	7	8	8	8	8	8	8	7	7	8	8	8	9	9	9	9	9	9	9	9	9	9	9	9	9
Ceahlăul Piatra Neamț	16	17	18	16	17	17	16	17	17	17	17	17	18	18	18	18	18	18	18	18	17	17	17	17	17	17	17	17	17	18	17	17	17	17
CFR Cluj	2	2	1	5	3	6	4	2	2	2	2	2	1	4	2	2	1	1	1	1	1	1	1	1	1	1	1	1	1	1	1	1	1	1
FC U Craiova	8	12	9	12	8	11	14	15	12	14	15	15	13	10	11	12	14	14	15	15	15	15	14	13	13	13	11	10	11	13	13	14	14	13
Dinamo București	8	15	7	3	2	4	2	7	7	6	7	6	6	7	7	7	8	8	6	7	6	5	4	5	5	5	6	6	6	6	6	6	6	6
Gaz Metan Mediaș	10	8	3	9	11	15	12	10	11	11	10	9	9	9	9	9	10	10	10	10	10	11	11	12	12	12	10	12	12	12	11	10	10	10
Gloria Bistrița	12	12	15	17	18	18	18	18	18	18	18	18	17	17	17	17	17	16	14	14	13	12	12	10	10	10	12	11	10	10	10	11	11	11
Internațional Curtea de Argeș	12	10	14	10	12	10	13	14	15	13	11	11	12	15	15	15	15	15	16	16	16	16	15	15	16	16	14	14	14	14	14	12	12	12
Oțelul Galați	4	5	12	13	16	13	15	12	13	15	12	12	11	14	10	10	9	9	9	9	9	8	8	8	8	8	8	8	8	8	8	8	7	8
Pandurii Târgu Jiu	4	1	4	11	7	3	8	9	10	10	9	10	10	13	12	14	11	13	13	13	14	14	16	16	15	14	15	16	15	15	15	16	16	15
Politehnica Iași	18	18	17	14	15	12	10	8	8	9	13	13	14	11	13	11	13	12	12	12	12	13	13	14	14	15	16	15	16	16	16	15	15	16
Rapid București	1	7	13	8	10	9	7	3	1	3	3	1	4	2	6	5	5	5	7	5	3	4	7	7	7	7	7	7	7	7	7	7	8	7
Steaua București	2	2	8	5	9	5	3	5	6	4	4	3	2	4	3	4	3	3	4	3	2	3	3	3	3	2	2	2	3	5	5	5	5	4
Timișoara	4	4	2	2	6	8	6	6	4	1	1	5	5	3	1	1	4	4	2	4	5	2	2	4	4	4	3	3	4	3	3	4	3	5
Unirea Alba Iulia	12	12	11	15	14	16	17	16	16	16	16	16	16	16	16	16	16	17	17	17	18	18	18	18	18	18	18	18	18	17	18	18	18	18
Unirea Urziceni	16	11	4	7	5	2	5	1	2	5	6	7	7	6	3	3	2	2	3	2	4	6	5	6	6	5	5	4	2	2	2	2	2	2
Vaslui	10	9	10	4	4	7	9	11	9	8	5	4	3	1	5	6	6	6	5	6	7	7	6	2	2	3	4	5	5	4	4	3	4	3

Source: kicker.de (in German)

== Results ==
Home \ Away	AST	BRA	CEA	CFR	UCR	DIN	GAZ	GBI	INT	OȚE	PAN	PIA	RAP	STE	TIM	UAI	URZ	VAS
Astra Ploiești	—	2–1	1–1	1–0	3–1	1–1	0–0	0–0	1–1	0–3	0–1	1–1	3–1	2–1	1–3	4–2	0–2	0–0
Brașov	0–0	—	1–0	0–1	2–0	0–1	3–2	6–0	1–2	3–0	2–0	2–0	1–1	0–0	1–0	2–1	0–0	1–1
Ceahlăul Piatra Neamț	0–0	2–1	—	2–4	2–1	0–4	0–0	2–1	2–2	0–1	1–2	1–0	0–4	0–2	1–1	1–1	2–3	0–1
CFR Cluj	1–0	2–1	2–0	—	2–0	2–2	2–0	1–0	2–1	1–0	1–0	1–1	1–0	1–1	0–0	3–2	2–0	0–0
FC U Craiova	1–0	3–0	3–2	2–3	—	0–0	1–2	5–1	1–3	3–0	2–0	2–1	3–4	1–2	1–2	3–1	1–4	1–2
Dinamo București	3–3	0–0	1–1	1–0	2–1	—	1–0	1–1	0–1	0–1	1–1	1–1	1–1	2–0	1–2	2–0	2–1	1–1
Gaz Metan Mediaș	0–0	1–1	0–2	0–0	2–1	1–0	—	1–1	0–0	0–1	1–0	2–1	0–0	2–4	2–6	5–0	0–0	0–0
Gloria Bistrița	3–1	2–1	1–0	0–2	2–1	3–2	1–1	—	0–1	2–1	1–0	5–0	1–1	1–2	0–0	1–1	0–0	1–3
Internațional Curtea de Argeș	2–1	0–3	2–0	0–1	0–1	1–3	2–4	2–1	—	0–1	0–0	0–2	1–2	0–2	0–3	2–1	1–2	1–2
Oțelul Galați	3–2	1–1	0–0	1–0	1–0	2–3	0–1	3–0	1–0	—	1–1	4–0	0–0	0–1	3–3	1–0	1–4	1–0
Pandurii Târgu Jiu	0–2	1–0	0–0	1–0	0–0	0–0	0–0	1–1	2–3	2–3	—	1–1	1–1	0–0	0–0	2–0	0–0	1–0
Politehnica Iași	2–0	0–0	2–0	0–2	1–0	1–3	1–1	0–0	0–0	1–1	1–0	—	2–1	0–2	1–1	1–0	1–2	1–3
Rapid București	0–1	2–1	1–1	1–4	0–1	2–2	4–1	2–1	4–0	3–0	1–0	4–1	—	5–1	0–3 (Note: The original result (1–0) was annulled and Rapid were awarded a 0–3 loss because they used ineligible players in the match against Timișoara.)	2–0	1–1	3–2
Steaua București	2–0	1–0	1–3	2–2	2–0	0–1	2–0	1–1	3–2	1–0	1–0	2–1	1–1	—	3–3	2–0	0–1	2–1
Timișoara	0–0	1–2	6–0	1–1	1–1	2–0	0–2	1–0	0–0	2–1	1–0	2–1	1–0	0–1	—	6–0	0–0	0–1
Unirea Alba Iulia	2–1	0–1	3–2	1–1	2–0	1–2	0–0	1–2	1–2	3–1	0–1	2–1	0–1	2–1	3–3	—	1–2	2–0
Unirea Urziceni	4–1	1–0	4–0	0–1	3–2	4–4	1–1	2–0	1–0	0–0	3–0	2–0	1–0	2–2	0–0	1–0	—	1–2
Vaslui	3–1	2–2	1–0	2–0	0–1	2–0	2–1	0–1	1–0	1–1	2–1	2–1	1–0	2–1	0–1	3–0	1–1	—

Source: LPF (in Romanian)
Legend: Blue = home team win; Yellow = draw; Red = away team win.

== Top goalscorers ==
Rank	Player	Club	Goals
1	(Romania) Andrei Cristea	Dinamo București	16
2	(Greece) Pantelis Kapetanos	Steaua București	15
3	(Romania) Dorin Goga	Timișoara	12
3	(Brazil) Wesley	Vaslui	12
3	(Romania) Marius Bilașco	Unirea Urziceni	12
6	(Romania) Liviu Ganea	Astra Ploiești	11
7	(Romania) Cristian Bud	CFR Cluj	10
7	(Brazil) Júnior Moraes	Gloria Bistrița	10
7	(Romania) Alexandru Ioniță	Rapid București	10
10	(Czech Republic) Lukáš Magera	Timișoara	9

Source: RomanianSoccer

== Champion squad ==
CFR Cluj

Goalkeepers: Nuno Claro (Portugal) (26 / 0); Boris Peškovič (Slovakia) (5 / 0); Eduard Stăncioiu (4 / 0).
Defenders: Hugo Alcântara (Brazil) (22 / 3); Nelson Cabrera (Bolivia) (5 / 0); Ricardo Cadú (Portugal) (28 / 5); Edimar (Brazil) (16 / 0); Léo Veloso (Brazil) (10 / 0); Gabriel Mureșan (28 / 2); Cristian Panin (29 / 0); Felice Piccolo (Italy) (10 / 0); Tony (Portugal) (19 / 0).
Midfielders: Andrei Boroștean (1 / 0); Davide Bottone (Italy) (7 / 0); Emmanuel Culio (Argentina) (28 / 1); Dani (Portugal) (21 / 0); Ciprian Deac (24 / 2); Roberto De Zerbi (Italy) (4 / 0); Emil Dică (14 / 1); Nicolae Dică (13 / 0); Sebastián Dubarbier (Argentina) (16 / 3); Darío Flores (Uruguay) (5 / 1); André Leão (Portugal) (5 / 0); Sixto Peralta (Argentina) (26 / 3); Eugen Trică (1 / 0).
Forwards: Cristian Bud (15 / 7); Sergiu Buș (1 / 0); Didi (Brazil) (7 / 0); Yssouf Koné (Burkina Faso) (21 / 6); Bogdan Mara (16 / 1); Nei (Brazil) (20 / 5); Diego Ruíz (Argentina) (1 / 0); Lacina Traoré (Ivory Coast) (25 / 6).
(league appearances and goals listed in brackets)

Manager: Toni Conceição (Portugal) / Andrea Mandorlini (Italy) .

== Season statistics ==
=== Scoring ===
- Hattricks scored: 4
  - Florin Costea for Craiova against Unirea, minutes 15, 31 and 79 (Round 9 – 3 October 2009)
  - Gheorghe Bucur for Timișoara against Gaz Metan, minutes 45, 72 and 85 (Round 15 – 29 November 2009)
  - Wesley Lopes da Silva for Vaslui against Unirea, minutes 47, 61 and 90 (Round 25 – 3 April 2010)
  - Cristian Bud for CFR against Unirea (Round 29 – 24 April 2009)

== Attendances ==
#	Club	Average
1	FC Rapid	9,824
2	CFR Cluj	9,451
3	Craiova	8,471
4	Timișoara	8,341
5	Steaua	6,578
6	Iași	5,676
7	Pandurii	5,235
8	Vaslui	4,765
9	Oțelul	4,500
10	Dinamo 1948	3,941
11	Gloria	3,588
12	Ceahlăul	3,529
13	Urziceni	3,235
14	Brașov	3,144
15	Gaz Metan	3,088
16	Alba Iulia	3,053
17	Internațional	2,435
18	Astra	2,388
