= Jieț (Danube) =

- Location within Romania

Location
- Country: Romania
- Counties: Dolj County
- Villages: Dobrești, Sadova, Lișteava, Ostroveni

Physical characteristics
- Mouth: Danube
  - location: Bechet
  - coordinates: 43.7483°N 23.9296°E
- Length: 52 km (32 mi)
- Basin size: 633 km^{2} (244 sq mi)

Basin features
- Progression: Danube→ Black Sea
- Tributaries
  - left: Valea Predeștilor

The Jieț is a left tributary of the river Danube in Romania. It discharges into the Danube near Bechet. Its length is 52 km (32 mi) and its basin size is 633 km^{2} (244 sq mi).
