= Sadova, Dolj =

Sadova
- Commune
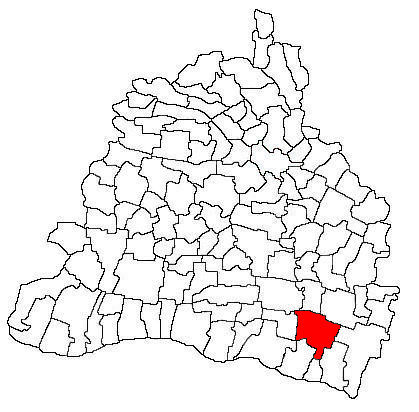
- Location in Dolj County

- Location in Romania
- Coordinates: 43°54′N 23°58′E
- Country: Romania
- County: Dolj

Government
  - Mayor (2024–2028): Claudiu-Eugen Arsenie (PSD)
- Area: 46 km^{2} (18 sq mi)
- Elevation: 61 m (200 ft)
- Population (2021-12-01): 8,361
  - Density: 180/km^{2} (470/sq mi)
- Time zone: EET/EEST (UTC+2/+3)
- Postal code: +(40) 251
- Area code: 207505
- Vehicle reg.: DJ
- Website: www.primariasadova.ro

Sadova is a commune in Dolj County, Oltenia, Romania. It is composed of two villages, Piscu Sadovei and Sadova.

Damian village, a separate commune from 1864 to 1908 and from 1923 to 1950, was also part of Sadova Commune from 1908 to 1922 and from 1950 to 1968, when it was abolished.

The commune is situated in the south of the Wallachian Plain, on the banks of the river Jieț, a left tributary of the Danube.

== Natives ==
- Toni Greblă (born 1953), jurist and politician
- Valentin Velcea (born 1973, football player and manager
