= Attila Hadnagy =

Romanian footballer (born 1980)

Personal information
- Full name: Attila László Hadnagy
- Date of birth: 8 September 1980 (age 46)
- Place of birth: Sfântu Gheorghe, Romania
- Height: 1.79 m (5 ft 10 in)
- Position: Striker

Team information
- Current team: Sepsi OSK (general director)

Youth career
- –1998: Oltul Sfântu Gheorghe

Senior career*
Years	Team	Apps	(Gls)
1998–2004	Oltul Sfântu Gheorghe	175	(131)
2004–2007	Petrolul Ploiești	67	(28)
2007–2012	FC Brașov	137	(37)
2013–2016	Botoșani	94	(28)
2016–2019	Sepsi OSK	64	(33)
Total		537	(257)

Managerial career
- 2019–: Sepsi OSK (General Director)
- * Club domestic league appearances and goals as of 21 May 2019

Attila László Hadnagy (born 8 September 1980) is a Romanian former footballer who played as a striker and serves as the general director of Liga II club Sepsi OSK.

== Career ==
=== Oltul Sfântu Gheorghe ===
Hadnagy started his career at hometown club Oltul Sfântu Gheorghe. At the end of his fifth Divizia C season at the team, they managed to win the league and got promoted to Divizia B. However they were relegated after only one year.

=== Petrolul Ploiești ===
Hadnagy spent the following three seasons at Divizia B side Petrolul Ploiești.

=== Brașov ===
In the summer of 2007, he joined the more ambitious Liga II side FC Brașov managed by Răzvan Lucescu and captained by Róbert Ilyés. They won the 2007–2008 Liga II which meant promotion to Liga I and he also became the top scorer of Liga II that season. He played in Liga I for the club until the winter break of the 2012–2013 season when he left for Liga II side Botoșani.

=== Botoșani ===
At Botoșani he managed to win his second Liga II title at the end of the 2012–2013 season. He stayed with the club for the following three Liga I seasons before accepting an offer from yet another Liga II side.

=== Sepsi OSK ===
In the summer of 2016 he joined Sepsi OSK, his hometown's recently founded team. He also became team captain. With his 28 goals in 31 games he played a vital role in obtaining promotion to Liga I at the end of the 2016–17 season. He played 2 more Liga I seasons for the team before retiring at the age of 38 in 2019.

== Personal life ==
Born in Sfântu Gheorghe, Hadnagy is of Hungarian ethnicity.

== Career statistics ==
=== Club ===
As of 21 May 2019

Club	Season	League			Cupa României		Cupa Ligii		Continental		Other		Total	
Club	Season	Division	Apps	Goals	Apps	Goals	Apps	Goals	Apps	Goals	Apps	Goals	Apps	Goals
Oltul Sfântu Gheorghe	1998–99	Divizia D	?	?	–		–		–		–		?	?
Oltul Sfântu Gheorghe	1999–00	Divizia C	?	?	–		–		–		–		?	?
Oltul Sfântu Gheorghe	2000–01	Divizia C	?	?	–		–		–		–		?	?
Oltul Sfântu Gheorghe	2001–02	Divizia C	?	?	–		–		–		–		?	?
Oltul Sfântu Gheorghe	2002–03	Divizia C	?	?	–		–		–		–		?	?
Oltul Sfântu Gheorghe	2003–04	Divizia B	28	7	–		–		–		–		28	7
Oltul Sfântu Gheorghe	Total		175	131	–	–	–	–	–	–	–	–	175	131
Petrolul Ploiești	2004–05	Divizia B	24	6	–		–		–		–		24	6
Petrolul Ploiești	2005–06	Divizia B	27	13	2	1	–		–		–		29	14
Petrolul Ploiești	2006–07	Liga II	16	9	–		–		–		–		16	9
Petrolul Ploiești	Total		67	28	2	1	–	–	–	–	–	–	69	29
Brașov	2007–08	Liga II	31	24	–		–		–		–		31	24
Brașov	2008–09	Liga I	24	3	0	0	–		–		–		24	3
Brașov	2009–10	Liga I	22	4	1	0	–		–		–		23	4
Brașov	2010–11	Liga I	24	2	1	0	–		–		–		25	2
Brașov	2011–12	Liga I	25	3	1	0	–		–		–		26	3
Brașov	2012–13	Liga I	11	1	1	0	–		–		–		12	1
Brașov	Total		137	37	4	0	–	–	–	–	–	–	141	37
Botoșani	2012–13	Liga II	9	5	–		–		–		–		9	5
Botoșani	2013–14	Liga I	29	8	0	0	–		–		–		29	8
Botoșani	2014–15	Liga I	29	9	0	0	1	1	–		–		30	10
Botoșani	2015–16	Liga I	27	6	1	0	1	0	3	0	–		32	6
Botoșani	Total		94	28	1	0	2	1	3	0	–	–	100	29
Sepsi OSK	2016–17	Liga II	31	28	1	0	–		–		–		32	28
Sepsi OSK	2017–18	Liga I	26	5	0	0	–		–		–		26	5
Sepsi OSK	2018–19	Liga I	7	0	2	0	–		–		–		9	0
Sepsi OSK	Total		64	33	3	0	–	–	–	–	–	–	67	33
Career Total			537	257	10	1	2	1	3	0	–	–	552	259

== Honours ==
Oltul Sfântu Gheorghe

- Divizia C: 2002–03

Brașov

- Liga II: 2007–08

Botoșani

- Liga II: 2012–13

Individual

- Liga II top scorer: 2007–08 (24 goals)
