= Boris Peškovič =

Slovak professional footballer

Personal information
- Full name: Boris Peškovič
- Date of birth: 30 June 1976 (age 50)
- Place of birth: Topoľčany, Czechoslovakia
- Height: 1.88 m (6 ft 2 in)
- Position: Goalkeeper

Youth career
- OFK Nedanovce

Senior career*
Years	Team	Apps	(Gls)
1999–2002	Slovan Bratislava	14	(0)
2002–2004	Świt NDM	43	(1)
2004	Widzew Łódź	13	(0)
2005–2006	Pogoń Szczecin	33	(0)
2007	Zagłębie Sosnowiec	14	(0)
2007–2008	Górnik Zabrze	24	(0)
2008–2009	Académica	28	(0)
2009–2010	CFR Cluj	5	(0)
2011	Tatran Prešov	4	(0)
2011–2012	Górnik Zabrze	1	(0)
2012	Wisła Płock	6	(0)
Total		190	(1)

Managerial career
- 2013–2019: Pogoń Szczecin (goalkeeping coach)
- * Club domestic league appearances and goals

Boris Peškovič (born 30 June 1976) is a Slovak former professional footballer who played as a goalkeeper.

== Club career ==
After starting out professionally with Slovan Bratislava, Peškovič went on to spend most of his career in Poland, representing several clubs. He also played one season in Portugal with Académica de Coimbra and spent one-and-a-half-year in Romania with CFR Cluj.

In the Ekstraklasa, Peškovič appeared for Świt Nowy Dwór Mazowiecki, Pogoń Szczecin and Górnik Zabrze (two spells with the latter). In January 2012, he left Górnik and moved to the second division club Wisła Płock.

== Honours ==
CFR Cluj

- Liga I: 2009–10
