= Gabriel Mărgărit =

Romanian footballer

Personal information
- Date of birth: 12 July 1971 (age 55)
- Place of birth: Bucharest, Romania
- Height: 1.77 m (5 ft 10 in)
- Position: Midfielder

Team information
- Current team: CFR Cluj (assistant)

Senior career*
Years	Team	Apps	(Gls)
1992–1993	Steaua Mizil		
1993–1994	Faur București	48	(10)
1995	Sportul Studențesc	3	(0)
1995–1996	Faur București		
1996–1999	Rocar București	115	(2)
2000	Henan Construction	18	(2)
2000	Universitatea Craiova	2	(0)
2001	Ceahlăul Piatra Neamț	14	(0)
2001–2003	Inter Gaz București	43	(3)
2004–2009	Otopeni	117	(2)
Total		360	(19)

Managerial career
- 2008: Otopeni (assistant)
- 2008: Otopeni (caretaker)
- 2008–2009: Otopeni (assistant)
- 2009–2010: Pandurii Târgu Jiu (assistant)
- 2010: CF Brăila (assistant)
- 2011: Sportul Studențesc (assistant)
- 2011–2012: Steaua București (assistant)
- 2012–2013: Concordia Chiajna (assistant)
- 2013: Vaslui (assistant)
- 2013–2014: FC Brașov (assistant)
- 2015–2017: Concordia Chiajna (assistant)
- 2017–2018: Kayserispor (assistant)
- 2018–2019: Al-Shabab (assistant)
- 2019–2021: Gaziantep (assistant)
- 2021: Çaykur Rizespor (assistant)
- 2021: CFR Cluj (assistant)
- 2021–2022: Yeni Malatyaspor (assistant)
- 2022: Al-Shabab (assistant)
- 2022–2023: Al-Raed (assistant)
- 2023–2024: Gaziantep (assistant)
- 2024–2025: Rapid București (assistant)
- 2026: Al-Okhdood (assistant)
- 2026–: CFR Cluj (assistant)
- * Club domestic league appearances and goals

Gabriel Mărgărit (born 12 July 1971) is a former Romanian professional footballer who played as a midfielder, currently assistant coach at Liga I club CFR Cluj.

== Club career ==
He played for teams such as Faur București, Rocar București, Henan Construction, Inter Gaz București or CS Otopeni, among others. Mărgărit played in more than 360 matches at the level of Liga I and Liga II and during the 2008–09 season he was manager, player and captain of CS Otopeni.

== Coaching career ==
After retirement, Mărgărit started to work as an assistant coach for teams such as Pandurii Târgu Jiu, Sportul Studențesc, Steaua București, Concordia Chiajna or FC Brașov. Since 2017, Gabriel Mărgărit is the assistant coach of Marius Șumudică and worked with him in Turkey and Saudi Arabia, for team such as Kayserispor, Gaziantep and Al-Shabab.
