= Radu Barbu =

Romanian footballer

Personal information
- Full name: Radu Marius Barbu
- Date of birth: 29 August 1989 (age 37)
- Place of birth: Craiova, Romania
- Height: 1.80 m (5 ft 11 in)
- Position: Centre back

Team information
- Current team: Voința Vișani

Senior career*
Years	Team	Apps	(Gls)
2008–2010	FC U Craiova	35	(1)
2010	→ CFR Craiova (loan)	9	(0)
2011	Petrolul Ploiești	18	(1)
2012	Mioveni	5	(0)
2012–2013	Brașov	1	(0)
2013–2014	Unirea Tărlungeni	19	(1)
2014–2015	Caransebeș	9	(0)
2015–2016	Academica Clinceni	4	(0)
2016–2018	Oltenița		
2018–	Voința Vișani		

International career
2008–2009	Romania U–21	4	(0)
- * Club domestic league appearances and goals as of 31 July 2017

Radu Barbu (born 29 August 1989) is a Romanian footballer who is under contract with Voința Vișani.
