= 2016 Russian Cup final =

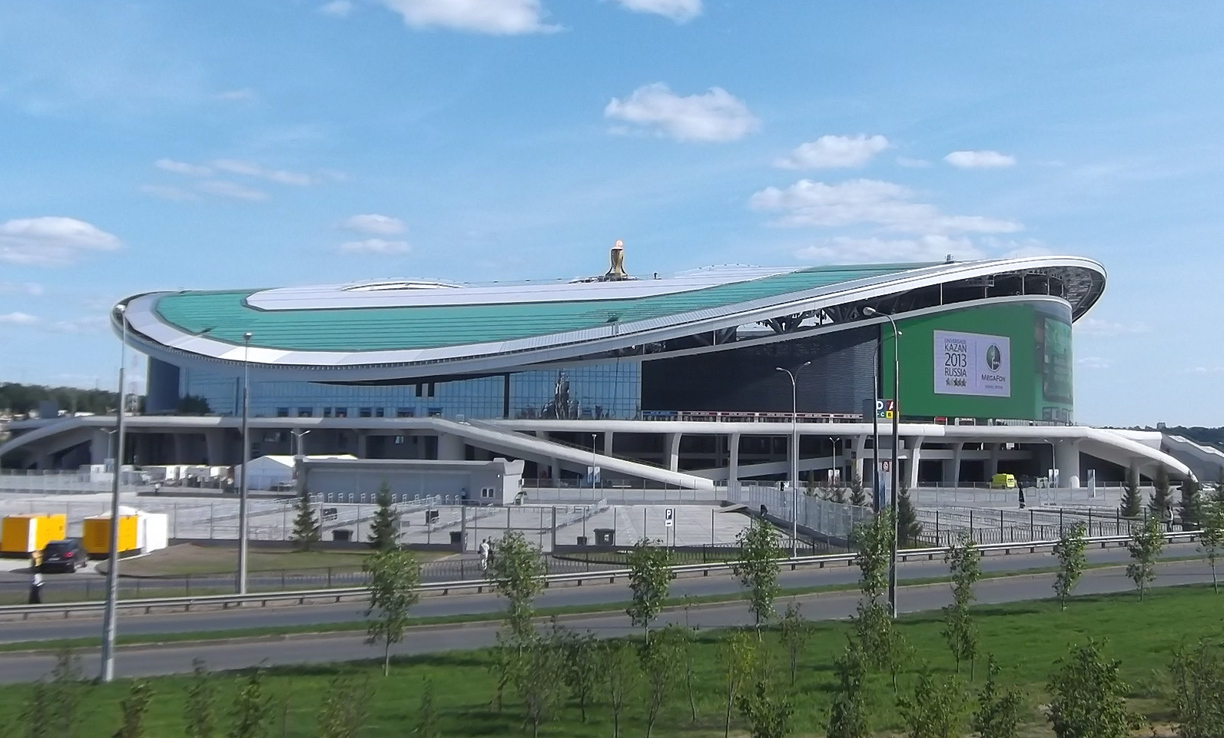
- The Kazan Arena hosted the final
- Event: 2015–16 Russian Cup
CSKA Moscow	Zenit Saint Petersburg
1	4
- Date: 2 May 2016
- Venue: Kazan Arena, Kazan
- Referee: Alexander Yegorov
- Attendance: 36,500

The 2016 Russian Cup final decided the winner of the 2015–16 Russian Cup, the 24th season of Russia's main football cup. It was played on 2 May 2016 at the Kazan Arena in Kazan, between CSKA Moscow and Zenit Saint Petersburg.

After being level 1—1 at halftime, Zenit scored three second half goals to emerge victorious with a 4-1 win.

As winners, Zenit qualified for the group stage of the 2016–17 UEFA Europa League, and also faced off against CSKA in a rematch of the cup final in the Russian Super Cup held on 23 July 2016.

== Match details ==
2 May 2016
16:00 MSK (UTC+3)

CSKA Moscow	1−4	Zenit Saint Petersburg
Olanare 36'	RPFL Report	Hulk 34' (pen.), 63' (pen.); Kokorin 55'; Yusupov 69'

Kazan Arena, Kazan
Attendance: 36,500
Referee: Alexander Yegorov

GK	35	(Russia) Igor Akinfeev (c)
DF	2	(Russia) Mário Fernandes
DF	24	(Russia) Vasiliy Berezutski	(red card) 62'
DF	4	(Russia) Sergei Ignashevich
DF	6	(Russia) Aleksei Berezutski	(yellow card) 18'	(substituted off) 60'
MF	66	(Israel) Bibras Natkho
MF	10	(Russia) Alan Dzagoev
MF	60	(Russia) Aleksandr Golovin
MF	18	(Nigeria) Ahmed Musa
MF	25	(Finland) Roman Eremenko	(yellow card) 53'	(substituted off) 66'
FW	99	(Nigeria) Aaron Samuel		(substituted off) 39'
Substitutes:
GK	1	(Russia) Sergei Chepchugov
DF	5	(Russia) Viktor Vasin		(substituted on) 66'
DF	15	(Russia) Taras Mykhalyk
DF	14	(Russia) Kirill Nababkin
MF	42	(Russia) Georgi Shchennikov
MF	17	(Russia) Sergei Tkachyov		(substituted on) 60'
FW	8	(Russia) Kirill Panchenko		(substituted on) 39'	(yellow card) 68'
FW	7	(Serbia) Zoran Tošić
Manager:
(Russia) Leonid Slutsky

GK	41	(Russia) Mikhail Kerzhakov
DF	4	(Italy) Domenico Criscito (c)
DF	24	(Argentina) Ezequiel Garay
DF	13	(Portugal) Luís Neto
DF	19	(Russia) Igor Smolnikov
MF	21	(Spain) Javi García
MF	14	(Russia) Artur Yusupov
MF	17	(Russia) Oleg Shatov	(yellow card) 75'
MF	7	(Brazil) Hulk	(yellow card) 78'	(substituted off) 83'
MF	28	(Belgium) Axel Witsel		(substituted off) 82'
FW	9	(Russia) Aleksandr Kokorin		(substituted off) 74'
Substitutes:
GK	51	(Russia) Maksim Rudakov
GK	1	(Russia) Yuri Lodygin
DF	6	(Belgium) Nicolas Lombaerts
DF	52	(Russia) Andrei Ivanov
DF	8	(Brazil) Maurício		(substituted on) 82'
DF	81	(Russia) Yuri Zhirkov		(substituted on) 83'
MF	70	(Russia) Dmitry Bogayev
MF	10	(Portugal) Danny
FW	22	(Russia) Artem Dzyuba		(substituted on) 74'
FW	92	(Russia) Pavel Dolgov
Manager:
(Portugal) André Villas-Boas

Match rules

- 90 minutes.
- 30 minutes of extra-time if necessary.
- Penalty shoot-out if scores still level.
- Seven named substitutes.
- Maximum of three substitutions.
