= Ostroveni =

- Commune
- Location in Romania
- Coordinates: 43°48′N 23°53′E
- Country: Romania
- County: Dolj

Government
  - Mayor (2021–2024): Florian Cîrciu
- Area: 54.65 km^{2} (21.10 sq mi)
- Population (2021-12-01): 4,451
  - Density: 81.45/km^{2} (210.9/sq mi)
- Time zone: UTC+02:00 (EET)
  - Summer (DST): UTC+03:00 (EEST)
- Vehicle reg.: DJ

Ostroveni is a commune in Dolj County, Oltenia, Romania with a population of 5,684 people. It is composed of two villages, Lișteava and Ostroveni.
