= 2007–08 Liga II =

Liga II
- Season: 2007–08
- Country: Romania
- Teams: 36 (2x18)
- Promoted: FC Brașov; Argeș Pitești; Otopeni; Gaz Metan Mediaș
- Relegated: Inter Gaz București; FCM Reșița; Focșani; Politehnica II Timișoara; Dunărea Galați; FC Caracal; Săcele; Corvinul 2005
- Top goalscorer: Attila Hadnagy (24 goals)

The 2007–08 Liga II was the 68th season of the second tier of the Romanian football league system. The season began on 25 August 2007 and lasted until 24 May 2008.

The format has been maintained to two series, each of them consisting of 18 teams. At the end of the season, the top two teams of the series promoted to Liga I and the bottom fourth places from both series relegated to Liga III.

== Team changes ==
=== To Liga II ===
Promoted from Liga III

- Unirea Focșani
- Dinamo II București
- Concordia Chiajna
- Severnav Drobeta-Turnu Severin
- Arieșul Turda
- Liberty Salonta
- Inter Gaz București
- Mureșul Deva

Relegated from Liga I

- Național București
- Argeș Pitești
- Jiul Petroșani

=== From Liga II ===
Relegated to Liga III

- Cetatea Suceava
- Building Vânju Mare
- FC Snagov
- Baia Mare
- Chimia Brazi
- Unirea Dej
- CF Brăila
- Auxerre Lugoj

Promoted to Liga I

- Universitatea Cluj
- Gloria Buzău
- Dacia Mioveni

=== Renamed teams ===
Național București was renamed as Progresul București.

Apulum Alba Iulia was renamed as Unirea Alba Iulia.

Unirea Focșani was renamed as CSM Focșani.

Severnav Drobeta-Turnu Severin was renamed as FC Drobeta-Turnu Severin.

== League tables ==
=== Seria I ===
Pos	Team	Pld	W	D	L	GF	GA	GD	Pts	Qualification
1	FC Brașov (C, P)	34	24	6	4	81	23	+58	78	Promotion to Liga I
2	Otopeni (P)	34	21	6	7	74	43	+31	69	Promotion to Liga I
3	Petrolul Ploiești	34	19	7	8	61	31	+30	64	
4	Prefab Modelu	34	17	7	10	54	36	+18	58	
5	Concordia Chiajna	34	17	6	11	52	45	+7	57	
6	Forex Brașov	34	15	6	13	36	24	+12	51	
7	Dunărea Giurgiu	34	13	10	11	37	43	−6	49	
8	Delta Tulcea	34	14	6	14	37	37	0	48	
9	Botoșani	34	13	8	13	34	41	−7	47	
10	Dinamo II București	34	12	9	13	59	73	−14	45	Ineligible for promotion
11	Progresul București	34	12	9	13	38	35	+3	44 (Note: Progresul București was deducted 1 point due to not achieving the 25 points limit in the Liga I, last season.)	
12	Sportul Studențesc București	34	10	12	12	37	46	−9	42	
13	Câmpina	34	10	8	16	31	48	−17	38 (Note: Bacău 0–0 Câmpina; Câmpina 2–1 Bacău)	
14	FCM Bacău	34	8	14	12	33	37	−4	38	
15	Inter Gaz București (R)	34	9	7	18	44	52	−8	34 (Note: Focșani 3–1 Inter Gaz; Inter Gaz 2–0 Focșani)	Relegation to Liga III
16	Focșani (R)	34	8	10	16	39	51	−12	34	Relegation to Liga III
17	Dunărea Galați (R)	34	7	7	20	26	66	−40	28	Relegation to Liga III
18	Săcele (R)	34	2	12	20	13	55	−42	18	Relegation to Liga III

Updated to match(es) played on 30 June 2008. Source: romaniansoccer.ro (in Romanian)
Rules for classification: 1) Points; 2) Head-to-head points; 3) Head-to-head goal difference; 4) Head-to-head goals scored; 5) Head-to-head away goals scored; 6) Goal difference; 7) Goals scored.
(C) Champions; (P) Promoted; (R) Relegated

=== Seria II ===
Pos	Team	Pld	W	D	L	GF	GA	GD	Pts	Qualification
1	Argeș Pitești (C, P)	34	25	5	4	77	22	+55	79 (Note: Argeș Pitești was deducted 1 point due to not achieving the 25 points limit in the Liga I, last season.)	Promotion to Liga I
2	Gaz Metan Mediaș (P)	34	24	1	9	77	43	+34	73	Promotion to Liga I
3	Râmnicu Vâlcea	34	18	7	9	56	39	+17	61	
4	Unirea Alba Iulia	34	18	6	10	56	36	+20	60	
5	Drobeta-Turnu Severin	34	17	7	10	46	33	+13	58	
6	Jiul Petroșani	34	18	8	8	53	29	+24	57 (Note: Jiul Petroșani were deducted 5 points due to not achieving the 25 points limit in the Liga I, last season.)	
7	Mureșul Deva	34	14	8	12	39	40	−1	50	
8	Bihor Oradea	34	13	8	13	32	36	−4	47 (Note: Bihor: 7 pts; Liberty: 5 pts; Târgoviște: 4 pts.)	
9	Liberty Salonta	34	13	8	13	36	33	+3	47	
10	FCM Târgoviște	34	12	11	11	45	40	+5	47	
11	IS Câmpia Turzii	34	11	8	15	29	38	−9	41 (Note: ISCT 1–0 Lupeni; Lupeni 0–0 ISCT)	
12	Minerul Lupeni	34	10	11	13	41	45	−4	41	
13	CFR Timișoara	34	11	6	17	34	45	−11	39	
14	Arieșul Turda	34	10	8	16	35	49	−14	38	
15	FCM Reșița (R)	34	9	6	19	38	65	−27	33 (Note: Politehnica II 1–4 Reșița; Reșița 0–0 Politehnica II)	Relegation to Liga III
16	Politehnica II Timișoara (R)	34	9	6	19	27	56	−29	33	Relegation to Liga III
17	FC Caracal (R)	34	6	7	21	34	57	−23	25	Relegation to Liga III
18	Corvinul 2005 Hunedoara (R)	34	4	7	23	21	70	−49	19	Relegation to Liga III

Updated to match(es) played on 30 June 2008. Source: romaniansoccer.ro (in Romanian)
Rules for classification: 1) Points; 2) Head-to-head points; 3) Head-to-head goal difference; 4) Head-to-head goals scored; 5) Head-to-head away goals scored; 6) Goal difference; 7) Goals scored.
(C) Champions; (P) Promoted; (R) Relegated

== Top scorers ==
24 goals

- (Romania) Attila Hadnagy (FC Brașov)

20 goals

- (Romania) Claudiu Boaru (Gaz Metan Mediaș)

17 goals

- (Romania) Marius Pena (Concordia Chiajna)

16 goals

- (Cameroon) Kallé Soné (Otopeni)

14 goals

- (Romania) Adrian Dulcea (Argeș Pitești)
- (Romania) Robert Ilyes (FC Brașov)

12 goals

- (Romania) Iulian Tameș (Argeș Pitești)

8 goals

- (Romania) Costin Curelea (Sportul Studențesc)

6 goals

- (Romania) Viorel Ferfelea (Sportul Studențesc)
- (Romania) Daniel Costescu (Progresul București)

5 goals

- (Romania) Alexandru Bourceanu (Dunărea Galați)
- (Romania) Sorin Pană (Otopeni)
- (Romania) Radu Neguț (Forex Brașov)
- (Romania) Gabriel Apetri (Jiul Petroșani)

== See also ==
- 2007–08 Liga I
- 2007–08 Liga III
