= George Bârlădeanu =

Romanian footballer

Personal information
- Full name: George Daniel Bârlădeanu
- Date of birth: 19 February 1988 (age 38)
- Place of birth: Galați, Romania
- Height: 1.80 m (5 ft 11 in)
- Position: Midfielder

Senior career*
Years	Team	Apps	(Gls)
2004–2008	Dunărea Galați	47	(10)
2005–2006	→ Politehnica Galați (loan)	21	(8)
2009	Unirea Urziceni	2	(0)
2009–2010	Politehnica Iași	16	(0)
2010–2014	Dunărea Galați	32	(3)
2012–2013	→ Farul Constanța (loan)	11	(0)
2014	Oțelul Galați	0	(0)
2015–2017	Sporting Liești	11	(3)
2017–2018	Oțelul Galați	19	(3)
2018–2020	Sporting Liești	31	(8)
2021	Oțelul Galați	1	(0)
2021–2022	Sporting Liești	27	(11)
Total		218	(46)
- * Club domestic league appearances and goals as of 11:34, 9 January 2024 (UTC)

George Daniel Bârlădeanu (born 19 February 1988) is a Romanian former football player who played as a midfielder for clubs such as Dunărea Galați, Politehnica Iași, Oțelul Galați or Sporting Liești, among others.

== Honours ==
Oțelul Galați

- Liga III: 2020–21
