= Liviu Ciobotariu =

Romanian football player and manager

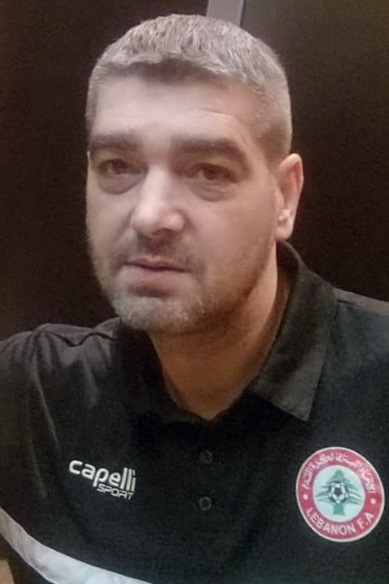
- Ciobotariu in 2019

Personal information
- Full name: Liviu Ciobotariu
- Date of birth: 26 March 1971 (age 55)
- Place of birth: Ghimpați, Romania
- Height: 1.88 m (6 ft 2 in)
- Position: Centre-back

Youth career
- –1989: Progresul București

Senior career*
Years	Team	Apps	(Gls)
1989–1998	Național București	173	(19)
1990–1991	→ Pandurii Târgu Jiu (loan)	24	(3)
1998–2000	Dinamo București	47	(4)
2000–2001	Standard Liége	47	(0)
2002–2004	RAEC Mons	46	(1)
2004	Royal Antwerp	14	(0)
2004–2005	Dinamo București	8	(0)
Total		359	(27)

International career
1997–2001	Romania	32	(3)

Managerial career
- 2006: Național București (caretaker)
- 2006–2007: Dunărea Galați
- 2007–2008: Otopeni
- 2008: Internațional Curtea de Argeș
- 2008–2009: Otopeni
- 2009–2010: Pandurii Târgu Jiu
- 2010: CF Brăila
- 2010–2011: Dinamo II București
- 2011–2012: Dinamo București
- 2012–2013: CSMS Iași
- 2013–2014: Vaslui
- 2015: ASA Târgu Mureș
- 2015–2016: Al-Faisaly
- 2018: Al-Tai
- 2018–2019: Botoșani
- 2019–2020: Lebanon
- 2021: Hermannstadt
- 2021–2023: Voluntari
- 2023: Sepsi OSK
- 2024–2025: Botoșani
- 2025: Petrolul Ploiești
- * Club domestic league appearances and goals

Liviu Ciobotariu (born 26 March 1971) is a Romanian professional football manager and former player.

== Playing career ==
Ciobotariu debuted in Divizia A with Progresul București in 1992.

He made his debut for the Romania national team in 1997 against Macedonia, and represented his country at the 1998 FIFA World Cup and Euro 2000. He played his last international match in 2001, and got 32 caps and 3 goals in total.

== Managerial career ==
Ciobotariu retired in 2005 and began to coach in 2006. Between July 2011 and April 2012, he was the manager of Dinamo București. In January 2015, he took control of ASA Târgu Mureș. Ciobotariu brought the team to the first position in Liga I, but failed to win the championship after two losses in the last two games of the 2014–15 season. At the end of the season, Ciobotariu ended his contract with ASA on mutual agreement.

On 4 June 2015, he was appointed as head coach of Saudi Professional League side Al-Faisaly, before moving to Al-Ta'ee in 2017. After one season, Ciobotariu was appointed manager of Botoșani.

On 3 June 2019, Ciobotariu was named manager of the Lebanon national team. After coaching for 10 games, on 17 June 2020 the Lebanese Football Association (LFA) decided not to extend Ciobotariu's contract, which had expired.

On 15 January 2021, Ciobotariu was appointed head coach of Liga I club Hermannstadt, signing a two-year contract. He was dismissed on 21 March after winning only one game out of 12. He became head coach of fellow Liga I side Voluntari on 7 May 2021.

== Personal life ==
His son Denis is also a footballer.

== Playing statistics ==
National team	Year	Apps	Goals
Romania	1997	2	0
Romania	1998	9	0
Romania	1999	8	1
Romania	2000	9	1
Romania	2001	4	1
Total		32	3

Romania score listed first, score column indicates score after each Ciobotariu goal.

Goal	Date	Venue	Opponent	Score	Result	Competition
1	4 September 1999	Tehelné pole, Bratislava, Slovakia	Slovakia	3–1	5–1	UEFA Euro 2000 qualifying
2	3 June 2000	Stadionul Ghencea, Bucharest, Romania	Greece	1–0	2–1	Friendly
3	26 February 2001	GSP Stadium, Nicosia, Cyprus	Ukraine	1–0	1–0	Friendly

== Honours ==
=== Player ===
Progresul București

- Divizia B: 1991–92
- Divizia C: 1989–90
- Cupa României runner-up: 1996–97

Dinamo București

- Divizia A: 1999–00
- Cupa României: 1999–00, 2004–05

=== Coach ===
Voluntari

- Cupa României runner-up: 2021–22

Sepsi OSK

- Supercupa României: 2023

Individual

- Gazeta Sporturilor Romania Coach of the Month: September 2021, July 2023, August 2023
