= CS Otopeni =

Romanian football club (2001–2013)

- Full name: Club Sportiv Otopeni
- Nicknames: Alb-albaștrii (The White-Blues); Aviatorii (Aircraft pilots)
- Short name: Otopeni
- Founded: 2001
- Dissolved: 2013
- Ground: Otopeni
- Capacity: 1,300
- Website: http://www.csotopeni.ro/
Home colours	Away colours

Clubul Sportiv Otopeni, commonly known as CS Otopeni or simply Otopeni, was a Romanian professional football team based in Otopeni, Ilfov County, and represented the football section of the namesake multi-sports club, which also included a basketball section. Founded in 2001, Otopeni is best known for its brief stint in Romania’s top flight in the 2008–09 season, before being dissolved in 2013.

== History ==
CS Otopeni was founded in 2001 at the initiative of the local mayor, Silviu Constantin Gheorghe, and played its home matches at Otopeni Stadium. The club competed in the Ilfov County Championship, narrowly missing promotion after finishing 2nd behind Sportul Ciorogârla in the 2001–02 season. However, it secured a place in the third tier after purchasing the spot from Conired Pucioasa.

In Divizia C, Otopeni competed in Series III, starting the 2002–03 season with Adrian Dumitru as head coach, who was replaced after nine rounds by Marian Pană, with the team finishing in 8th place. In the following campaign, the White and Blues showed notable improvement, managing a good run in the Cupa României, where they defeated Farul Constanța 3–3 (a.e.t., 4–3 on penalties) before losing 1–5 to Dinamo București in the Round of 16, before going on to win the 2003–04 Divizia C series and earning promotion to Divizia B.

Placed in Series II of Divizia B, Otopeni finished 3rd in the 2004–05 season. In the following season, the team reached the Round of 32 in the Cupa României, where it lost 2–5 to Politehnica Timișoara, before finishing 4th in 2005–06. Following a reform of the second tier, which was renamed Liga II and reduced in both the number of teams and series, Otopeni competed in Series I, finishing 7th in the 2006–07 season, and once again reached the Round of 32 in the Cupa României, where it lost 1–4 (a.e.t.) to UTA Arad.

In 2008 the team on the outskirts of Bucharest managed the biggest performance in the club's history, namely promoting to the Liga I finishing as runners-up in the 2007–08 season. Because its own stadium in Otopeni didn't meet the licensing conditions for the first league, the team played its matches on Astra Stadium in Ploiești.

It didn't achieve much in Romania's top football division, finishing next to last at the end of 2008–09 season and relegating back to the Liga II.

The following seasons it finished 6th, 6th, 12th and 4th in the second division.

In the summer of 2013 the club was withdrawn from the Liga II by its owners and dissolved.

== Honours ==
Liga II

- Runners-up (1): 2007–08

Liga III

- Winners (1): 2003–04

== Former managers ==
- (Romania) Adrian Dumitru (2002)
- (Romania) Marian Pană (2002–2006)
- (Romania) Liviu Ciobotariu (2007–2008)
- (Romania) Gabriel Mărgărit (2008)
- (Serbia) Miodrag Ješić (2008)
- (Romania) Liviu Ciobotariu (2008–2009)
- (Romania) Viorel Ion (2012–2013)
- (Romania) Marian Bucurescu
