= Valentin Velcea =

Romanian footballer and manager

Personal information
- Full name: Valentin Adrian Velcea
- Date of birth: 5 September 1973 (age 53)
- Place of birth: Sadova, Romania
- Height: 1.81 m (5 ft 11 in)
- Position: Midfielder

Team information
- Current team: CSC Peciu Nou (technical director)

Youth career
- Viitorul Timișoara

Senior career*
Years	Team	Apps	(Gls)
1990–1999	Politehnica Timișoara	166	(12)
1991–1992	→ UM Timișoara (loan)		
1992–1993	→ CFR Timișoara (loan)		
1994–1995	→ UTA Arad (loan)	3	(0)
1999–2004	Gloria Bistriţa	117	(3)
2004–2006	Politehnica Timișoara	14	(0)
Total		300	(15)

Managerial career
- 2007: Politehnica Timișoara (caretaker)
- 2009: Politehnica Timișoara (caretaker)
- 2009–2010: Politehnica II Timișoara
- 2010–2011: Politehnica Timișoara (assistant)
- 2011–2012: Politehnica Timișoara
- 2012–2013: ACS Poli Timișoara
- 2013: ACS Poli Timișoara (sporting director)
- 2025–: CSC Peciu Nou (technical director)
- * Club domestic league appearances and goals as of 19 August 2011 ‡ National team caps and goals as of 25 November 2009

Valentin Adrian Velcea (born 5 September 1973 in Sadova) is a retired Romanian football midfielder and manager. He is currently the technical director at CSC Peciu Nou.

== Club career ==
=== Politehnica Timișoara ===
Velcea started football in Timișoara and made a name for himself while at Politehnica. He was a very technical midfielder with good passing and long shots.

He stayed at the club most of his career, swapping to Gloria Bistriţa in 1999 where he scored three goals, before returning to the Politehnica Timișoara in 2004. He retired after being deemed a surplus to the team requirements by Gheorghe Hagi in 2006.

== Coaching career ==
=== Politehnica Timișoara ===
Velcea was assistant manager from 2006 to 2009 when he was promoted to Politehnica II Timișoara before he returned as assistant in 2010 after poor results.

He also was two times caretaker manager and plays two Cupa României finals after Alin Artimon resigned and Gabi Balint was sacked just one week before the final. However, Velcea loses both finals, first 0–2 at home against Rapid București in 2007 and the other one in 2009 at Tudor Vladimirescu stadium 3–0 against CFR Cluj.

Although Politehnica Timișoara finished on the second place in the 2010–11 Liga I, the team was relegated to Liga II after the license necessary to play in the first division was denied by Romanian Football Federation and Dušan Uhrin, Jr. left the team in July, and Velcea was appointed the new manager of the team on 4 August 2011.

=== Coaching stats ===
As of 5 August 2013

Team	From	To	Record						
Team	From	To	G	W	D	L	GF	GA	Win %
Politehnica Timișoara	19 March 2007	11 June 2007	13	7	1	5	16	16	53.85
Politehnica Timișoara	1 June 2009	30 June 2009	2	0	0	2	0	4	0.00
Politehnica II Timișoara	1 July 2009	30 June 2010	30	11	6	13	32	36	36.67
Politehnica Timișoara	27 July 2011	30 June 2012	33	21	8	4	58	20	63.64
ACS Poli Timișoara	15 August 2012	10 October 2013	35	16	12	7	49	27	45.71
Total			113	55	27	31	155	103	48.67

== Honours ==
=== Player ===
Politehnica Timișoara

- Liga II (1): 1994–95

=== Coach ===
FC Politehnica Timișoara

- Liga II (1): 2011–2012

ACS Poli Timișoara

- Liga II Runner-up (1): 2012–13
