= Sigma Towers =

General information
- Status: Proposed
- Location: Cluj Napoca, Romania
- Cost: US$ 200,000,000
- Owner: TriGránit

Height
- Roof: 120 m (390 ft)

Technical details
- Floor count: 35
- Floor area: 120,000 m^{2} (1,300,000 sq ft)

Sigma Towers is a proposed building project situated in Cluj-Napoca, Romania, which would comprise two 35-floor towers linked by a 4-floor commercial centre, another two buildings of 7 and 5 floors and a 3-floor parking building.

== The first tower T1 ==
T1 will be a 49,000 m^{2} building with:

- 15,500 m^{2} of office spaces;
- 11,500 m^{2} five star hotel with 170 rooms;
- 22,000 m^{2} of apartments.

== The second tower T2 ==
T2 will be a 71,000 m^{2} building with:

- 44,000 m^{2} of office spaces;
- 12,000 m^{2} shopping spaces;
- 15,000 m^{2} of apartments.

The entire complex would have a total of 1,350 parking spaces in a 3 floor separate building.
