= Róbert Ilyés =

Romanian footballer and manager

Personal information
- Date of birth: 4 February 1974 (age 52)
- Place of birth: Miercurea Ciuc, Romania
- Height: 1.77 m (5 ft 10 in)
- Position: Central midfielder

Team information
- Current team: CSM Olimpia Satu Mare (head coach)

Youth career
- –1991: Rapid Miercurea Ciuc

Senior career*
Years	Team	Apps	(Gls)
1991–1992	Rapid Miercurea Ciuc		
1992–1993	Mureșul Toplița		
1993–1995	Harghita Odorheiu Secuiesc		
1995–1998	Foresta Suceava	110	(19)
1999–2001	Astra Ploiești	91	(14)
2002–2005	Rapid București	103	(26)
2006–2007	Khazar Lankaran	26	(2)
2007–2011	FC Brașov	122	(33)
2011–2012	FCM Târgu Mureș	29	(6)
2013–2018	FK Csíkszereda		
2020	Sepsi OSK II		
Total		481	(100)

International career
2017–2018	Székely Land		

Managerial career
- 2013: FC Brașov (assistant)
- 2013–2017: FK Csíkszereda (player/coach)
- 2017–2019: FK Csíkszereda U19
- 2017–2018: Székely Land (player/coach)
- 2019–2023: Sepsi OSK (assistant)
- 2021: Sepsi OSK (caretaker)
- 2023–2026: FK Csíkszereda
- 2026–: CSM Olimpia Satu Mare
- * Club domestic league appearances and goals

Róbert Ilyés (born 4 February 1974) is a Romanian football manager and former player who played as a midfielder, currently in charge of Liga II club CSM Olimpia Satu Mare.

== Club career ==
=== Foresta Fălticeni ===
He started his professional career by joining Divizia B side Foresta Fălticeni in 1995. In his second season at the club he played a crucial role in winning the 1996–97 Divizia B title that also meant promotion to Divizia A. The club barely avoided relegation at the end of the 1997–98 Divizia A season and as the team stood last before the winter break of the 1998–99 Divizia A season he left midseason to the better rated Divizia A side Astra Ploiești.

=== Astra Ploiești ===
With his continued good performances as a box-to-box midfielder throughout the 3 seasons that he played for Astra, he drew the attention of bigger Bucharest clubs.

=== Rapid București ===
Rapid București manager Viorel Hizo signed him during the winter transfer window of the 2001–02 Divizia A. He enjoyed major success at the club, winning the 2001–02 Cupa României, 2002 Supercupa României, 2002–03 Divizia A and 2003 Supercupa României. Although he was vital to the team's success, he felt that his financial compensation was unfairly low compared to other teammates. He did not renew his contract in the winter of 2005.

=== Khazar Lankaran ===
During his one and a half-year spell at the club, he went on to win both the 2006–07 Azerbaijan Top League and 2006–07 Azerbaijan Cup with Khazar.

=== FC Brașov ===
He returned to Romania to Liga II side FC Brașov in July 2007. Being the team captain, he helped the side promote to Liga I by winning the 2007–08 Liga II. He spent the following 3 seasons playing for the club in Liga I.

=== Târgu Mureș ===
After one last Liga I season at FCM Târgu Mureș, he decided to retire as a player.

=== Later lower league games ===
After a brief assistant manager spell at FC Brașov, he returned to play football in the lower Romanian leagues as the player-manager of FK Csíkszereda. While being the assistant manager of Sepsi OSK, he made a few Liga III appearances for the club's reserve team. He scored his last Liga III goal on 9 October 2020 at the age of 46.

== Managerial career ==
In 2013 he had a brief spell as the assistant manager of Liga I side FC Brașov. Later in 2013 he became player-manager at his hometown club FK Csíkszereda. He led the team to promotion from Liga IV to Liga III at the end of his first season but he struggled to obtain promotion to Liga II in the following 3 seasons. In 2017 he switched to coaching the youth team of the club and in 2018 he obtained the UEFA B Licence in Hungary. He left FK Csíkszereda for an assistant manager role at Liga I side Sepsi OSK in 2019.

== International career ==
He was player-manager of the Székely Land squad that finished 3rd at the 2017 ConIFA European Football Cup and 4th at the 2018 ConIFA World Football Cup respectively.

== Career statistics ==
Appearances and goals by club, season and competition
Club	Season	League			National Cup (Note: Includes Cupa României, Azerbaijan Cup)		Europe		Other		Total	
Club	Season	Division	Apps	Goals	Apps	Goals	Apps	Goals	Apps	Goals	Apps	Goals
Rapid Miercurea Ciuc	1991–92	Divizia C	?	?	?	?	—		—		?	?
Mureșul Toplița	1992–93	Divizia C	?	?	?	?	—		—		?	?
Harghita Odorheiu Secuiesc	1993–94	Divizia C	?	?	?	?	—		—		?	?
Harghita Odorheiu Secuiesc	1994–95	Divizia C	?	?	?	?	—		—		?	?
Harghita Odorheiu Secuiesc	Total		?	?	?	?	—		—		?	?
Foresta Suceava	1995–96	Divizia B	30	6	0	0	—		—		30	6
Foresta Suceava	1996–97	Divizia B	30	7	0	0	—		—		30	7
Foresta Suceava	1997–98	Divizia A	33	4	1	0	—		—		34	4
Foresta Suceava	1998–99	Divizia A	17	2	1	0	—		—		18	2
Foresta Suceava	Total		110	19	2	0	—		—		112	19
Astra Ploiești	1998–99	Divizia A	16	2	—		—		—		16	2
Astra Ploiești	1999–00	Divizia A	32	6	2	0	—		—		34	6
Astra Ploiești	2000–01	Divizia A	28	4	1	0	—		—		29	4
Astra Ploiești	2001–02	Divizia A	15	2	2	0	—		—		17	2
Astra Ploiești	Total		91	14	5	0	—		—		96	14
Rapid București	2001–02	Divizia A	15	5	4	0	—		—		19	5
Rapid București	2002–03	Divizia A	23	5	2	1	4 (Note: Appearances in UEFA Cup)	0	0	0	29	6
Rapid București	2003–04	Divizia A	26	6	3	2	2 (Note: Appearances in UEFA Champions League)	1	1 (Note: Appearance in Supercupa României)	0	32	9
Rapid București	2004–05	Divizia A	24	8	1	0	—		—		25	8
Rapid București	2005–06	Divizia A	15	2	3	3	10	0	—		28	5
Rapid București	Total		103	26	13	6	16	1	1	0	133	33
Khazar Lankaran	2005–06	Azerbaijan Top League	13	2	3	0	—		—		16	2
Khazar Lankaran	2006–07	Azerbaijan Top League	13	0	4	3	—		—		17	3
Khazar Lankaran	Total		26	2	7	3	—		—		33	5
FC Brașov	2007–08	Liga II	30	14	3	1	—		—		33	15
FC Brașov	2008–09	Liga I	31	5	2	2	—		—		33	7
FC Brașov	2009–10	Liga I	28	5	4	2	—		—		32	7
FC Brașov	2010–11	Liga I	33	9	5	1	—		—		38	10
FC Brașov	Total		122	33	14	6	—		—		136	39
FCM Târgu Mureș	2011–12	Liga I	29	6	2	1	—		—		31	7
FK Csíkszereda	2013–14	Liga IV	?	?	?	?	—		—		?	?
FK Csíkszereda	2014–15	Liga III	?	?	?	?	—		—		?	?
FK Csíkszereda	2015–16	Liga III	?	?	?	?	—		—		?	?
FK Csíkszereda	2016–17	Liga III	?	?	?	?	—		—		?	?
FK Csíkszereda	2017–18	Liga III	?	?	?	?	—		—		?	?
FK Csíkszereda	Total		?	?	?	?	—		—		?	?
Sepsi OSK II	2020–21	Liga III	?	?	?	?	—		—		?	?
Career total			481	100	43	16	16	1	1	0	541	117

== Managerial statistics ==
As of 31 October 2026

Team	From	To	Record							
Team	From	To	G	W	D	L	GF	GA	GD	Win %
(Romania) FK Csíkszereda	23 September 2013	30 June 2017	99	59	15	25	235	91	+144	59.60
Székely Land	4 June 2017	10 June 2018	11	5	2	4	25	14	+11	45.45
(Romania) Sepsi OSK	28 September 2021	10 October 2021	1	0	1	0	2	2	+0	0.00
(Romania) FK Csíkszereda	19 March 2023	16 May 2026	116	50	28	38	148	143	+5	43.10
(Romania) CSM Olimpia Satu Mare	24 September 2026	present	4	1	2	1	6	5	+1	25.00
Total			231	115	48	68	416	255	+161	49.78

== Honours ==
=== Player ===
Foresta Fălticeni

- Divizia B: 1996–97

Rapid București

- Divizia A: 2002–03
- Cupa României: 2001–02
- Supercupa României: 2002, 2003

Khazar Lankaran

- Azerbaijan Top League: 2006–07
- Azerbaijan Cup: 2006–07

FC Brașov

- Liga II: 2007–08

FK Csíkszereda

- Liga IV – Harghita County: 2013–14

Székely Land

- CONIFA European Football Cup third place: 2017
- CONIFA World Football Cup fourth place: 2018

=== Coach ===
FK Csíkszereda

- Liga IV – Harghita County: 2013–14

Székely Land

- CONIFA European Football Cup third place: 2017
- CONIFA World Football Cup fourth place: 2018
