= 2008–09 FC Steaua București season =

Steaua București
2008–09 season
- Owner: George Becali
- President: Valeriu Argăseală
- Head coach: Marius Lăcătuș; Massimo Pedrazzini (caretak.); Dorinel Munteanu; Marius Lăcătuș; Massimo Pedrazzini (caretak.)
- Stadium: Stadionul Steaua
- Liga I: 6th
- Cupa României: Round of 32
- Champions League: Group stage
- Top goalscorer: League: Pantelis Kapetanos; Bogdan Stancu (11); All: Pantelis Kapetanos; Bogdan Stancu (11)
- Highest home attendance: 24,343 vs Galatasaray (27 August 2008)
- Lowest home attendance: 11,218 vs Gloria Buzău (25 October 2008)
- Average home league attendance: 14,895
Home colours	Away colours

The 2008–09 season was the 61st season in the existence of FC Steaua București and the club's 61st consecutive season in the top flight of Romanian football. In addition to the domestic league, Steaua București participated in this season's edition of the Cupa României and the UEFA Champions League.

== Players ==
=== Transfers ===
==== In ====
Total spending: €7,15M
Player	From	Fee
(Romania) János Székely	(Romania) Oțelul Galați	€1.5M
(Romania) Bogdan Stancu	(Germany) Unirea Urziceni	€1M
(Romania) Claudiu Ionescu	(Germany) Gloria Buzău	Free
(Romania) Robert Neagoe	(Romania) Dacia Mioveni	€0.1M
(Romania) Ciprian Tătărușanu	(Romania) Gloria Bistrița	€1.5M
(Portugal) Tiago Gomes	(Portugal) Estrela da Amadora	Loan
(Brazil) Arthuro	(Spain) Deportivo Alavés	€0.55M
(Greece) Pantelis Kapetanos	(Greece) AEK Athens	Free
(Colombia) Juan Toja	(United States) Dallas	€0.58M
(Spain) Abel	(Spain) Real Murcia	€0.2M
(Bolivia) Ricardo Pedriel	(Bolivia) Wilstermann	€0.17M
(Romania) George Ogăraru	(Netherlands) Ajax	Loan
(Romania) Andrei Ionescu	(Romania) Universitatea Craiova	€0.5M
(Portugal) António Semedo	(Romania) CFR Cluj	€0.95M
(Romania) Emil Ninu	(Romania) Gloria Buzău	Back from loan
(Romania) Vlad Rusu	(Romania) Steaua II București	Promoted
(Romania) Lucian Filip	(Romania) Steaua II București	Promoted
(Romania) Dorinel Munteanu	(Romania) Universitatea Cluj	€0.1M
(Romania) Valentin Badea	(Greece) Panserraikos	Back from loan
(Romania) Alexandru Tudose	(Romania) Gloria Buzău	Back from loan
(Romania) Eric Bicfalvi	(Romania) Gloria Buzău	Back from loan
(Romania) Alin Lițu	(Romania) Gloria Buzău	Back from loan
(Romania) Robert Neagoe	(Romania) Gloria Bistrița	Back from loan
(Romania) Cezar Lungu	(Romania) Steaua II București	Promoted
(Romania) Mihai Onicaș	(Romania) Steaua II București	Promoted

==== Out ====
Total income: €9M
Player	New team	Fee
(Nigeria) Dino Eze	(Romania) Gloria Buzău	Free
(Central African Republic) Habib Habibou	(Belgium) Charleroi	End of loan
(Peru) Andrés Mendoza	(Mexico) Monarcas Morelia	End of contract
(Colombia) Pepe Moreno	(Argentina) Independiente	End of loan
(Romania) Nicolae Dică	(Italy) Catania	€2M
(Brazil) André Nunes	(Brazil) Malucelli	Released
(Romania) Claudiu Ionescu	(Romania) Gloria Buzău	Free
(Romania) Mihai Neșu	(Netherlands) Utrecht	€1M
(Spain) Abel	(Spain) Xerez	Released
(Brazil) Arthuro	(Russia) Terek Grozny	Released
(Romania) Dorinel Munteanu	(Romania) Universitatea Cluj	Released
(Romania) Valentin Badea	(Romania) Steaua II București	Second team
(Romania) Robert Neagoe	(Romania) Steaua II București	Second team
(Romania) Adrian Neaga	(Azerbaijan) Neftchi Baku	Released
(Romania) Mirel Rădoi	(Saudi Arabia) Al-Hilal	€6M

==== Loan out ====
Player	Team	Until
(Romania) Emil Ninu	(Romania) Gloria Buzău	September 2008
(Romania) Alexandru Tudose	(Romania) Gloria Buzău	December 2008
(Romania) Eric Bicfalvi	(Romania) Gloria Buzău	December 2008
(Romania) Alin Lițu	(Romania) Gloria Buzău	December 2008
(Romania) Valentin Badea	(Greece) Panserraikos	December 2008
(Romania) Robert Neagoe	(Romania) Gloria Bistrița	January 2009
(Romania) Ciprian Tătărușanu	(Romania) Gloria Bistrița	May 2009
(Romania) Emil Ninu	(Romania) Gloria Bistrița	May 2009
(Romania) Valentin Simion	(Romania) Pandurii Târgu Jiu	May 2009
(Romania) Romeo Surdu	(Romania) Brașov	May 2009
(Romania) Cosmin Vâtcă	(Romania) Gaz Metan Mediaș	May 2009
(Romania) Ionuț Rada	(Romania) Otopeni	May 2009
(Romania) Daniel Bălan	(Cyprus) Alki Larnaca	May 2009

== Statistics ==
=== Player stats ===
No.	Pos	Nat	Player	Total		Liga I		Cupa României		UEFA Champions League	
No.	Pos	Nat	Player	Apps	Goals	Apps	Goals	Apps	Goals	Apps	Goals
1	GK	(Colombia) COL	Róbinson Zapata	41	-40	33	-26	0	0	8	-14
2	DF	(Romania) ROU	George Ogăraru	24	0	20	0	0	0	4	0
3	DF	(Romania) ROU	Dorin Goian	33	2	26	1	0	0	7	1
4	DF	(Poland) POL	Paweł Golański	20	0	16	0	1	0	3	0
7	MF	(Romania) ROU	János Székely	20	1	16	1	0	0	4	0
8	MF	(Romania) ROU	Ovidiu Petre	17	2	11	1	0	0	6	1
9	MF	(Portugal) POR	António Semedo	30	3	24	3	0	0	6	0
10	FW	(Colombia) COL	Dayro Moreno	35	6	27	5	0	0	8	1
11	FW	(Romania) ROU	Alin Lițu	8	0	8	0	0	0	0	0
12	GK	(Romania) ROU	Cornel Cernea	2	-1	2	-1	0	0	0	0
13	DF	(Nigeria) NGA	Ifeanyi Emeghara	0	0	0	0	0	0	0	0
14	MF	(Colombia) COL	Juan Toja	28	2	23	2	0	0	5	0
15	DF	(Romania) ROU	Alexandru Tudose	2	0	2	0	0	0	0	0
16	MF	(Romania) ROU	Bănel Nicoliță	33	5	26	3	0	0	7	2
17	DF	(Romania) ROU	Eugen Baciu	12	0	10	0	1	0	1	0
18	DF	(Romania) ROU	Petre Marin	36	0	28	0	0	0	8	0
19	MF	(Romania) ROU	Andrei Ionescu	9	0	8	0	1	0	0	0
20	MF	(Romania) ROU	Florin Lovin	30	1	23	1	0	0	7	0
21	FW	(Romania) ROU	Răzvan Ochiroșii	10	0	9	0	1	0	0	0
22	FW	(Bolivia) BOL	Ricardo Pedriel	5	0	4	0	1	0	0	0
23	MF	(Romania) ROU	Mihăiță Pleșan	10	0	8	0	1	0	1	0
24	DF	(Romania) ROU	Sorin Ghionea	36	0	28	0	1	0	7	0
26	MF	(Romania) ROU	Eric Bicfalvi	6	0	6	0	0	0	0	0
28	FW	(Romania) ROU	Bogdan Stancu	35	11	29	11	1	0	5	0
30	MF	(Portugal) POR	Tiago Gomes	31	0	24	0	1	0	6	0
31	MF	(Romania) ROU	Mihai Onicaș	1	0	1	0	0	0	0	0
33	GK	(Romania) ROU	Cezar Lungu	0	0	0	0	0	0	0	0
34	DF	(Romania) ROU	Lucian Filip	1	0	0	0	1	0	0	0
35	FW	(Greece) GRE	Pantelis Kapetanos	27	11	23	11	0	0	4	0
36	FW	(Romania) ROU	Vlad Rusu	3	0	2	0	1	0	0	0
Players sold or loaned out during the season
5	DF	(Romania) ROU	Ionuț Rada	4	0	3	0	1	0	0	0
6	MF	(Romania) ROU	Mirel Rădoi	20	1	13	1	0	0	7	0
9	FW	(Romania) ROU	Valentin Badea	1	0	1	0	0	0	0	0
11	FW	(Brazil) BRA	Arthuro	14	2	9	1	0	0	5	1
15	DF	(Romania) ROU	Mihai Neșu	5	0	3	0	0	0	2	0
19	MF	(Romania) ROU	Claudiu Ionescu	0	0	0	0	0	0	0	0
25	FW	(Romania) ROU	Adrian Neaga	8	0	7	0	1	0	0	0
26	MF	(Spain) ESP	Abel	2	0	2	0	0	0	0	0
33	MF	(Romania) ROU	Robert Neagoe	0	0	0	0	0	0	0	0
40	MF	(Romania) ROU	Dorinel Munteanu	0	0	0	0	0	0	0	0
82	GK	(Romania) ROU	Cosmin Vâtcă	1	-2	0	0	1	-2	0	0
84	FW	(Romania) ROU	Romeo Surdu	0	0	0	0	0	0	0	0

Winter-break goals
Player	Goals
(Romania) Bogdan Stancu	4
(Greece) Pantelis Kapetanos	3
(Romania) Ovidiu Petre	2
(Romania) Alin Lițu	2
(Colombia) Dayro Moreno	2
(Brazil) Arthuro	1
(Romania) George Ogăraru	1
(Bolivia) Ricardo Pedriel	1

Pre-season goals
Player	Goals
(Romania) Bogdan Stancu	3
(Romania) János Székely	1
(Romania) Florin Lovin	1
(Romania) Romeo Surdu	1
(Romania) Mihăiță Pleșan	1
(Romania) Bănel Nicoliță	1
(Romania) Valentin Badea	1
(Romania) Mirel Rădoi	1
(Romania) Adrian Neaga	1
(Colombia) Dayro Moreno	1

=== Start formations ===
Qnt	Formation	Match(es)
17	4-4-1-1	1, 3, TQR1, 4, 5, TQR2, 6, 7, 9, 10, 19, 21, 22, 26, 27, 28, 31
10	4-4-2	2, 8, UCL2, CR32, 12, 17, UCL6, 29, 30, 33
8	4-2-3-1	UCL1, 11, UCL3, 15, 16, UCL5, 32, 34
5	4-1-4-1	18, 20, 23, 24, 25
2	4-3-3	13, UCL4
1	4-3-2-1	14

Last updated: 19:31, 10 June 2009 (UTC)
Source: Match reports in Competitive matches
Only competitive matches.

=== Starting XI ===
No.	Pos.	Nat.	Name	MS	Notes
1	GK	(Colombia)	Rufay		
18	LB	(Romania)	Ogăraru		
24	CB	(Romania)	S. Ghionea		
3	CB	(Romania)	D. Goian		
2	RB	(Romania)	M. Nesu		
14	LW	(Colombia)	M. Radoi		
10	CM	(Colombia)	Bicfalvi		
30	CM	(Portugal)	Ov.Petre		
16	RW	(Romania)	Nicoliță		
28	FW	(Romania)	Stancu		
35	FW	(Greece)	Kapetanos		

Source: Squad stats and Start formations.
Only competitive matches.
Using the most used start formation.
Ordered by position on pitch (from back right to front left).

=== Disciplinary record ===
No.	Player	Booked		(yellow card) (yellow-red card)		Sent off (straight red)	
No.	Player	Liga + Cupa	UCL	Liga + Cupa	UCL	Liga + Cupa	UCL
1	(Colombia) Róbinson Zapata	1					
2	(Romania) George Ogăraru	8					
3	(Romania) Dorin Goian	10	4				
4	(Poland) Paweł Golański	8	1		1		
6	(Romania) Mirel Rădoi	3	2				
7	(Romania) János Székely	2					
8	(Romania) Ovidiu Petre	2	2				
9	(Portugal) António Semedo	3	1				
10	(Colombia) Dayro Moreno	4	1				
11	(Romania) Alin Lițu	1					
11	(Brazil) Arthuro	2	1				
14	(Colombia) Juan Toja	3		1			
15	(Romania) Mihai Neșu		1				
16	(Romania) Bănel Nicoliță	4	4				
17	(Romania) Eugen Baciu	2					
18	(Romania) Petre Marin	5	1	1			
19	(Romania) Andrei Ionescu	1					
20	(Romania) Florin Lovin	7	2	1		1	
21	(Romania) Răzvan Ochiroșii	2					
23	(Romania) Mihăiță Pleșan	1					
24	(Romania) Sorin Ghionea	5		1			
25	(Romania) Adrian Neaga	1					
28	(Romania) Bogdan Stancu	3	2				
30	(Portugal) Tiago Gomes	4					
35	(Greece) Pantelis Kapetanos	5	1				

== Competitions ==
=== Overall record ===
Competition	First match	Last match	Starting round	Final position	Record							
Competition	First match	Last match	Starting round	Final position	Pld	W	D	L	GF	GA	GD	Win %
Liga I	30 July 2008	10 June 2009	Matchday 1	6th	34	14	14	6	44	27	+17	41.18
Cupa României	14 October 2008		Round of 32	Round of 32	1	0	0	1	0	2	−2	0.00
UEFA Champions League	13 August 2008	10 December 2008	Third qualifying round	Group stage	8	1	2	5	6	14	−8	12.50
Total					43	15	16	12	50	43	+7	34.88

Source: Competitions

=== Liga I ===
==== League table ====
Pos	Team	Pld	W	D	L	GF	GA	GD	Pts	Qualification or relegation
4	CFR Cluj	34	16	11	7	44	26	+18	59	Qualification to Europa League play-off round (Note: CFR Cluj as the 2008–09 Cupa României winners qualified for the play-off round of the 2009–10 UEFA Europa League.)
5	Vaslui	34	17	6	11	44	37	+7	57	Qualification to Europa League third qualifying round
6	Steaua București	34	14	14	6	44	27	+17	56 (Note: STE 2–1 CRA; CRA 0–0 STE)	Qualification to Europa League second qualifying round
7	Universitatea Craiova	34	15	11	8	44	25	+19	56	
8	Rapid București	34	16	7	11	44	34	+10	55 (Note: RAP 3–1 BRA; BRA 0–0 RAP)	

Source: LPF (in Romanian)
Rules for classification: 1) points; 2) head-to-head points; 3) head-to-head goal difference; 4) head-to-head goals scored; 5) goal difference; 6) number of goals scored.

==== Results summary ====
Overall								Home						Away					
Pld	W	D	L	GF	GA	GD	Pts	W	D	L	GF	GA	GD	W	D	L	GF	GA	GD
34	14	14	6	44	27	+17	56	9	7	1	28	12	+16	5	7	5	16	15	+1

Source: LT

==== Results by round ====
Round	1	2	3	4	5	6	7	8	9	10	11	12	13	14	15	16	17	18	19	20	21	22	23	24	25	26	27	28	29	30	31	32	33	34
Ground	A	H	A	H	A	H	A	H	A	H	A	H	A	A	H	A	H	H	A	H	A	H	A	H	A	H	A	H	A	H	H	A	H	A
Result	L	W	W	W	D	W	W	W	D	D	L	D	D	D	D	D	W	D	L	W	D	W	L	D	W	D	W	W	W	D	L	L	W	D
Position	13	8	7	5	6	4	2	1	3	2	3	4	4	4	5	5	4	6	6	6	8	7	8	7	7	6	6	4	4	4	7	7	6	6

Source: Matches
A = Away; H = Home; W = Win; D = Draw; L = Loss

==== Matches ====
30 July 2008 Round 1	Vaslui	1–0	Steaua București	Vaslui
20:30	Ljubinković 25', (yellow card) 26'; N'Doye (yellow card) 29'; Genchev (yellow card) 36'; Temwanjera (yellow card) 40'; Luz (yellow card) 42'; Marković (yellow card) 78'; P. Jovanović (yellow card) 83' (yellow-red card) 85'	Report	(yellow card) 49' Tiago Gomes; (yellow card) 68' Székely; (yellow card) 59' (yellow-red card) 81' Ghionea	Stadium: Municipal; Referee: Ovidiu Hațegan

3 August 2008 Round 2	Steaua București	2–1	Brașov	București
21:00	Lovin (yellow card) 23'; Dayro Moreno 32'; Arthuro 89', (yellow card) 89'	Report	(yellow card) 14' Munteanu; 53', (yellow card) 54' Roman; (yellow card) 64' Rui Duarte; (yellow card) 80' Măldărășanu	Stadium: Steaua; Attendance: 18,493; Referee: Mugurel Drăgănescu

8 August 2008 Round 3	Politehnica Iași	0–2	Steaua București	Iași
20:00	Bratu (yellow card) 14'; Beršnjak (yellow card) 27'; Ilie (yellow card) 65'	Report	50' (o.g.) Pečnik; (yellow card) 72' Goian; 89' Stancu	Stadium: Emil Alexandrescu; Attendance: 11,481; Referee: Augustus Constantin

16 August 2008 Round 4	Steaua București	2–0	Argeș Pitești	București
20:00	Nicoliță 4', (yellow card) 31'; Arthuro (penalty missed) 40' (pen.); Golański (yellow card) 68'; Stancu 74'; Lovin (yellow card) 67' (yellow-red card) 82'	Report	(yellow card) 33' Bărbulescu; (red card) 34' Kamara; (yellow card) 51' Cârstoiu	Stadium: Steaua; Referee: Teodor Crăciunescu

23 August 2008 Round 5	Gloria Bistrița	2–2	Steaua București	Bistrița
18:00	Borbely 4'; Mărginean (yellow card) 19'; Petre (yellow card) 42'; Albuț (yellow card) 63'; Diogo (yellow card) 70'; Hora 73'	Report	(yellow card) 24' Neaga; 43', 90+4' Stancu; (yellow card) 78' Toja	Stadium: Gloria; Referee: Cristian Balaj

1 September 2008 Round 6	Steaua București	1–0	Pandurii Târgu Jiu	București
20:00	Lovin 45'; Baciu (yellow card) 75'	Report	(yellow card) 23' Iordache; (yellow card) 66' Tilincă; (yellow card) 79' Vasilache	Stadium: Steaua; Attendance: 17,540; Referee: Marius Martiș

13 September 2008 Round 7	Farul Constanța	1–4	Steaua București	Constanța
21:00	Maxim (penalty missed) 9' (pen.); Băcilă (red card) 34'; Teekloh (yellow card) 51'; Rusmir (yellow card) 71'; Gosic 90+2'	Report	29' Semedo; 31' (o.g.) Maxim; (yellow card) 79', (goal) 90' Kapetanos; (penalty scored) 90+3' (pen.) Székely	Stadium: Farul; Referee: Ovidiu Hațegan

21 September 2008 Round 8	Steaua București	4–0	Gaz Metan Mediaș	București
20:45	Semedo 6', 65'; Ghionea (yellow card) 25'; Nicoliță 29'; Kapetanos 90+4'	Report	(yellow card) 82' Sabou	Stadium: Steaua; Referee: Robert Dumitru

26 September 2008 Round 9	CFR Cluj	1–1	Steaua București	Cluj-Napoca
20:45	Dubarbier 37'	Report	6' Dayro Moreno; (yellow card) 23' Ogăraru; (yellow card) 27' Semedo; (yellow card) 72' Arthuro	Stadium: Dr. Constantin Rădulescu; Attendance: 20,118; Referee: Augustus Constantin

4 October 2008 Round 10	Steaua București	1–1	Otopeni	București
20:00	P. Marin (yellow card) 85'; Kapetanos 90+3'	Report	(yellow card) 31' Dumitrescu; (yellow card) 38' Nibombé; (yellow card) 82' Munteanu; (yellow card) 83' Pîrvu; 87' Negru; (yellow card) 90' Scarlatache	Stadium: Steaua; Referee: Marius Avram

17 October 2008 Round 11	Oțelul Galați	2–0	Steaua București	Galați
15:00	Pena 23'; Tănasă (yellow card) 67', (goal) 82'; Kolev (yellow card) 78'	Report	(yellow card) 90' Semedo	Stadium: Oțelul; Referee: Cristian Balaj

25 October 2008 Round 12	Steaua București	1–1	Gloria Buzău	București
19:00	Nicoliță 50', (penalty missed) 90' (pen.); Pleșan (yellow card) 70'; Lovin (yellow card) 73'	Report	58' Vlaicu; (yellow card) 67' Arcaba; (yellow card) 72' Moreira; (yellow card) 90+3' Vigariu	Stadium: Steaua; Attendance: 11,218; Referee: Mugurel Drăgănescu

1 November 2008 Round 13	Dinamo București	1–1	Steaua București	București
21:00	Izvoranu (yellow card) 33'; Ad. Cristea 84'	Report	8' Kapetanos; (yellow card) 22' Golański; (yellow card) 51' Ogăraru; (yellow card) 88' Rădoi	Stadium: Dinamo; Referee: Alexandru Deaconu

9 November 2008 Round 14	Rapid București	0–0	Steaua București	București
21:00	Maftei (yellow card) 33'; Boya (yellow card) 74'; Perjă (yellow card) 75'; João Paulo (yellow card) 82'; Răduță (yellow card) 90+3'	Report	(yellow card) 41' Tiago Gomes; (yellow card) 66' Goian	Stadium: Giulești-Valentin Stănescu; Referee: Alexandru Tudor

15 November 2008 Round 15	Steaua București	2–2	Timișoara	București
21:00	Dayro Moreno 69'; Rădoi (yellow card) 74', (goal) 79'; Lovin (yellow card) 76'; Ogăraru (yellow card) 82'; Székely (yellow card) 90+3'	Report	(yellow card) 33', (goal) 77' Bădoi; 53' Goga; (yellow card) 58' Bucur; (yellow card) 59' Borbély	Stadium: Steaua; Referee: Cristian Balaj

21 November 2008 Round 16	FC U Craiova	0–0	Steaua București	Craiova
20:45	Wobay (yellow card) 8'; Mitchell (yellow card) 30'	Report	(yellow card) 30' Goian; (yellow card) 37' Ov. Petre; (yellow card) 56' Golański; (yellow card) 90' P. Marin	Stadium: Ion Oblemenco; Referee: Alexandru Tudor

1 December 2008 Round 17	Steaua București	1–0	Unirea Urziceni	București
20:00	Ov. Petre (yellow card) 17'; Nicoliță (yellow card) 23'; Ghionea (yellow card) 27'; Rădoi (yellow card) 39'; Stancu (yellow card) 45'; Goian (yellow card) 50'; P. Marin (yellow card) 79' (yellow-red card) 80'; Kapetanos 90'; Zapata (yellow card) 90+5'	Report	(yellow card) 29' Todoran; (yellow card) 45' Mehmedović	Stadium: Steaua; Referee: István Kovács

27 February 2009 Round 18	Steaua București	1–1	Vaslui	București
20:45	Kapetanos (yellow card) 18'; Stancu 28'; Toja (yellow card) 56' (yellow-red card) 85'; Ogăraru (yellow card) 88'	Report	8' Wesley; (yellow card) 43' Pavlović; (yellow card) 47' Temwanjera; (yellow card) 75' Cânu	Stadium: Steaua; Attendance: 17,024; Referee: Ovidiu Hațegan

8 March 2009 Round 19	Brașov	1–0	Steaua București	Brașov
15:00	Buga (yellow card) 43'; Abrudan 75'	Report	(yellow card) 18' Nicoliță; (yellow card) 23' P. Marin; (yellow card) 59' Dayro Moreno; (yellow card) 86' Lovin	Stadium: Silviu Ploieșteanu; Referee: Cristian Balaj

14 March 2009 Round 20	Steaua București	1–0	Politehnica Iași	București
20:00	Stancu 6', (yellow card) 74'; Goian (yellow card) 29'; Dayro Moreno (yellow card) 71'; Kapetanos (yellow card) 72'; Ogăraru (yellow card) 87'	Report	(yellow card) 34' Cristea; (yellow card) 90+2' Straton	Stadium: Steaua; Referee: Mugurel Drăgănescu

20 March 2009 Round 21	Argeș Pitești	2–2	Steaua București	Pitești
20:45	Tănase 15'; Bălașa (yellow card) 45'; Bazzi 88'	Report	43' Ov. Petre; (yellow card) 59' Lovin; (penalty missed) 74' (pen.) Ogăraru; (yellow card) 86' Tiago Gomes; 87' Kapetanos; (yellow card) 90+1' Goian	Stadium: Nicolae Dobrin; Referee: Ionică Serea

4 April 2009 Round 22	Steaua București	1–0	Gloria Bistrița	București
18:00	Golański (yellow card) 29'; P. Marin (yellow card) 44'; Stancu (penalty missed) 78' (pen.); Kapetanos 83'	Report	(yellow card) 35' Nalați; (yellow card) 78' Azevedo; (yellow card) 81' Achim; (yellow card) 88' Zaharia	Stadium: Steaua; Attendance: 15,321; Referee: Teodor Crăciunescu

7 April 2009 Round 23	Pandurii Târgu Jiu	2–0	Steaua București	Târgu Jiu
21:00	Tremonti (yellow card) 11', (goal) 43', 67'; Mingote (yellow card) 62'; Stângă (yellow card) 73'; Hidișan (yellow card) 90+1'	Report	(yellow card) 10' Kapetanos; (yellow card) 36' Baciu; (yellow card) 55' Goian; (yellow card) 59' Lovin; (yellow card) 90' Dayro Moreno	Stadium: Tudor Vladimirescu; Referee: Ovidiu Hațeganu

10 April 2009 Round 24	Steaua București	1–1	Farul Constanța	București
20:45	Stancu 55'; Ionescu (yellow card) 80'	Report	72' Chico	Stadium: Steaua; Referee: Lucian Dan

17 April 2009 Round 25	Gaz Metan Mediaș	0–1	Steaua București	Mediaș
16:00	Kubala (yellow card) 55'; Buzean (yellow card) 14' (yellow-red card) 71'	Report	(yellow card) 7' Golański; 29' Kapetanos; (yellow card) 72' Ghionea; (yellow card) 72' Nicoliță; (yellow card) 77' Goian	Stadium: Municipal; Referee: Cristian Balaj

22 April 2009 Round 26	Steaua București	1–1	CFR Cluj	București
21:00	Ogăraru (yellow card) 38'; Lovin (red card) 42'; Goian (yellow card) 49'; Dayro Moreno 54', (yellow card) 65'; Ghionea (yellow card) 85'; Ochiroșii (yellow card) 90+2'	Report	9' Culio; (yellow card) 10' Pereira; (yellow card) 71' Dani; (yellow card) 31' (yellow-red card) 73' Panin	Stadium: Steaua; Attendance: 17,658; Referee: Teodor Crăciunescu

26 April 2009 Round 27	Otopeni	0–1	Steaua București	Ploiești
20:00	Panait (yellow card) 30'; Negru (yellow card) 30'; Chiacu (yellow card) 30'; Diogo (yellow card) 80'	Report	(yellow card) 45+1' Ogăraru; 90+1' Kapetanos; (yellow card) 90+3' Stancu; (yellow card) 90+4' Lițu	Stadium: Astra; Referee: Adrian Comănescu

1 May 2009 Round 28	Steaua București	5–0	Oțelul Galați	București
20:45	P. Marin (yellow card) 15'; Stancu 34'; Goian (penalty scored) 45+2' (pen.); Toja (yellow card) 55', (goal) 58'; Dayro Moreno 67'; Golański (yellow card) 79'; Kapetanos 85'	Report	(red card) 45+1' Giurgiu; (yellow card) 79' Iorga; (yellow card) 80' Râpă	Stadium: Steaua; Referee: Alexandru Tudor

5 May 2009 Round 29	Gloria Buzău	0–1	Steaua București	Buzău
21:00	Ademar (yellow card) 44'; Sandu (yellow card) 63'	Report	(yellow card) 15' Lovin; 16' Stancu; (yellow card) 56' Ochiroșii	Stadium: Municipal; Referee: Alexandru Deaconu

8 May 2009 Round 30	Steaua București	1–1	Dinamo București	București
21:00	Tiago Gomes (yellow card) 40'; Goian (yellow card) 72'; Ghionea (yellow card) 78'; Moți 82' (o.g.); Golański (yellow card) 89'	Report	(yellow card) 26' Izvoranu; (yellow card) 49' Torje; (yellow card) 58' Boștină; (yellow card) 73' Niculescu; (yellow card) 84' Marius Niculae; 88' (o.g.) P. Marin	Stadium: Steaua; Attendance: 23,693; Referee: Carlos Velasco Carballo (Spain)

15 May 2009 Round 31	Steaua București	1–2	Rapid București	București
21:00	Kapetanos 52', (yellow card) 62'; Toja (yellow card) 79'	Report	(yellow card) 47' Dică; 47', 69' Spadacio; (yellow card) 61' João Paulo; (yellow card) 85' Pitbull	Stadium: Steaua; Referee: Florian Mayer (Germany)

22 May 2009 Round 32	Timișoara	1–0	Steaua București	Timișoara
21:00	Parks 32'; Nibombé (yellow card) 65'; Artavazd Karamyan (yellow card) 65'	Report	(yellow card) 29' Golański	Stadium: Dan Păltinișanu; Referee: Olivier Thual (France)

29 May 2009 Round 33	Steaua București	2–1	FC U Craiova	București
21:00	Semedo (yellow card) 11'; Toja 18'; Ogăraru (yellow card) 52'; Stancu 79'	Report	21' F. Costea	Stadium: Steaua; Attendance: 0 (close doors); Referee: Dimitris Kalopoulos (Greece)

10 June 2009 Round 34	Unirea Urziceni	1–1	Steaua București	Urziceni
20:00	Rusescu 52'	Report	47' Stancu	Stadium: Tineretului; Referee: Nikolay Petrov (Bulgaria)

=== Cupa României ===
==== Results ====
14 October 2008 Round of 32	Sportul Studențesc	2–0	Steaua București	Urziceni
16:45	Lung (yellow card) 31'; Curelea 67'; Ghinga (yellow card) 68'; Postolache (yellow card) 82'; Varga 89'			Stadium: Tineretului; Referee: Mugurel Drăgănescu

=== UEFA Champions League ===
==== Qualifying rounds ====
===== Third qualifying round =====
13 August 2008 First leg	Galatasaray (Turkey)	2–2	(Romania) Steaua București	Istanbul, Turkey
21:15	Nonda 18', 47'; Şaş (yellow card) 42'		4' Dayro Moreno; 12', (yellow card) 42' Nicoliță; (yellow card) 79' Rădoi; (yellow card) 80' Arthuro	Stadium: Ali Sami Yen; Referee: Laurent Duhamel (France)

27 August 2008 Second leg	Steaua București (Romania)	1–0 (3–2 agg.)	(Turkey) Galatasaray	București, Romania
20:45	Ov. Petre (yellow card) 22'; Nicoliță (yellow card) 40', (goal) 58'; Neșu (yellow card) 71'; Goian (yellow card) 80'		(yellow card) 16' Arda; (yellow card) 76' Şaş; (yellow card) 84' Ümit	Stadium: Steaua; Attendance: 24,343; Referee: Matteo Trefoloni (Italy)

==== Group stage ====
Group F standings
Pos	Team	Pld	W	D	L	GF	GA	GD	Pts	Qualification	BAY	LYO	FIO	STE
1	(Germany) Bayern Munich	6	4	2	0	12	4	+8	14	Advance to knockout phase	—	1–1	3–0	3–0
2	(France) Lyon	6	3	2	1	14	10	+4	11	Advance to knockout phase	2–3	—	2–2	2–0
3	(Italy) Fiorentina	6	1	3	2	5	8	−3	6	Transfer to UEFA Cup	1–1	1–2	—	0–0
4	(Romania) Steaua București	6	0	1	5	3	12	−9	1		0–1	3–5	0–1	—

Source: RSSSF

===== Results =====
17 September 2008 Matchday 1	Steaua București (Romania)	0–1	(Germany) Bayern	București, Romania
21:45	Goian (yellow card) 42'; Lovin (yellow card) 69'		15' van Buyten; (yellow card) 88' Podolski	Stadium: Steaua; Attendance: 21,379; Referee: Claus Bo Larsen (Denmark)

30 September 2008 Matchday 2	Fiorentina (Italy)	0–0	(Romania) Steaua București	Florence, Italy
20:45			(yellow card) 28' P. Marin; (yellow card) 70' Stancu	Stadium: Artemio Franchi; Attendance: 25,383; Referee: Michael Riley (England)

21 October 2008 Matchday 3	Steaua București (Romania)	3–5	(France) Lyon	București, Romania
21:45	Arthuro 8'; Goian 11'; Nicoliță (yellow card) 19'; Ov. Petre 45'		23' Keita; (yellow card) 28' Toulalan; 33', 71' Benzema; 69', 90+2' Fred	Stadium: Steaua; Attendance: 22,239; Referee: Grzegorz Gilewski (Poland)

5 November 2008 Matchday 4	Lyon (France)	2–0	(Romania) Steaua București	Lyon, France
20:45	Cris (yellow card) 30'; Juninho 44', (yellow card) 79'; Réveillère 89'		(yellow card) 30' Kapetanos; (yellow card) 34' Stancu; (yellow card) 59' Goian	Stadium: Stade de Gerland; Attendance: 37,243; Referee: Manuel Mejuto González (Spain)

25 November 2008 Matchday 5	Bayern (Germany)	3–0	(Romania) Steaua București	Munich, Germany
20:45	Klose 57', 71'; Toni 61'		(yellow card) 15' Ov. Petre; (yellow card) 29' Goian; (yellow card) 84' Golański	Stadium: Allianz Arena; Attendance: 64,000; Referee: Eric Braamhaar (Netherlands)

10 December 2008 Matchday 6	Steaua București (Romania)	0–1	(Italy) Fiorentina	București, Romania
21:45	Nicoliță (yellow card) 1'; Dayro Moreno (yellow card) 20'; Semedo (yellow card) 21'; Lovin (yellow card) 71'; Golański (yellow card) 64' (yellow-red card) 72'; Rădoi (yellow card) 82'		(yellow card) 14' Zauri; (yellow card) 63', (goal) 66' Gilardino	Stadium: Steaua; Attendance: 12,862; Referee: Luis Medina Cantalejo (Spain)

=== Non competitive matches ===
30 June 2008 Matchday 1	Maribor (Slovenia)	0–2	(Romania) Steaua București	Maribor, Slovenia
20:00			32' Stancu; 48' Székely	Stadium: Ljudski vrt Referee: Slavko Vinčić

2 July 2008 Matchday 2	Austria Kärnten	1–3	(Romania) Steaua București	Feldkirchen in Kärnten, Austria
17:30	Nuhiu 79'		3' Lovin; 14' Surdu; 17' Pleșan	Stadium: Feldkirchen; Referee: Slavko Vinčić

4 July 2008 Matchday 3	Red Bull Salzburg (Austria)	3–0	(Romania) Steaua București	Salzburg, Austria
19:00	Sekagya 1'; Janko 83', 87'			Stadium: Red Bull Arena; Referee: Rudolf Gruber

10 July 2008 Matchday 4	Swindon Town (England)	2–2	(Romania) Steaua București	Bischofshofen, Austria
18:00	Ghionea 27' (o.g.); Cox 38'		48' Stancu; 88' Nicoliță	Stadium: Bischofshofen

13 July 2008 Matchday 5	Viktoria Plzeň (Czech Republic)	1–1	(Romania) Steaua București	Bischofshofen, Austria
18:00	Trapp 31'		38' Badea	Stadium: Bischofshofen

15 July 2008 Matchday 6	Beşiktaş (Turkey)	0–1	(Romania) Steaua București	Bad Reichenhall, Austria
18:30			35' (pen.) Rădoi	Stadium: Bad Reichenhall

18 July 2008 Matchday 7	Nürnberg (Germany)	0–0	(Romania) Steaua București	Nuremberg, Germany
18:15				Stadium: Frankenstadion

26 July 2008 Matchday 8	Steaua București (Romania)	3–1	(Italy) Roma	București, Romania
20:45	Dayro Moreno 8'; Stancu 74'; Neaga 80'		90' Vučinić	Stadium: Steaua; Referee: Sebastian Colțescu

5 December 2008 Matchday 9	Steaua București (Romania)	1–4	(Romania) România A	București, Romania
14:00	Arthuro 29'		48', 51', 75' Bucur; 65' Bicfalvi	Stadium: Steaua; Attendance: 0 (close doors); Referee: Alexandru Tudor

18 January 2009 Matchday 10	Tianjin Teda (China)	1–3	(Romania) Steaua București	Oliva, Spain
16:00	Zhang 28'		26', 33' Ov. Petre; 76' Dayro Moreno	Stadium: Oliva Nova

20 January 2009 Matchday 11	Zürich (Switzerland)	2–2	(Romania) Steaua București	Oliva, Spain
16:00	Stahel 14'; Djuric 29'		20' Lițu; 50' Kapetanos	Stadium: Oliva Nova

22 January 2009 Matchday 12	Alicante (Spain)	0–2	(Romania) Steaua București	Oliva, Spain
16:00			18' Kapetanos; 90' Lițu	Stadium: Oliva Nova

3 February 2009 Matchday 13	Slovan Bratislava (Slovakia)	1–1	(Romania) Steaua București	Kadriye, Turkey
17:00	Meszároš 87'		29' (pen.) Ogăraru	Stadium: IC Sports Center

6 February 2009 Matchday 14	Hajduk Split (Croatia)	0–1	(Romania) Steaua București	Belek, Turkey
16:00			81' Pedriel	Stadium: WOW Kremlin Sports Center

8 February 2009 Matchday 15	AaB (Denmark)	1–0	(Romania) Steaua București	Belek, Turkey
17:00	Curth 23'			Stadium: Arcadia Sports Center

12 February 2009 Matchday 16	Moscow (Russia)	1–2	(Romania) Steaua București	Belek, Turkey
17:00	Baciu 90' (o.g.)		60' Dayro Moreno; 84' Stancu	Stadium: Arcadia Sports Center

14 February 2009 Matchday 17	Rudar Pljevlja (Montenegro)	1–1	(Romania) Steaua București	Antalya, Turkey
12:00	Bojović 64'		69' Stancu	Stadium: Gloria Sports Center

20 February 2009 Matchday 18	Steaua București (Romania)	3–2	(Romania) Steaua II București	București, Romania
12:00	Kapetanos 20'; Stancu 25', 45'		41' Mustață; 56' Rusu	Stadium: Steaua București complex

== Staff ==
=== Management ===
- Manager: Marius Lăcătuș (resigned), Massimo Pedrazzini (caretaker), Dorinel Munteanu (sacked), Marius Lăcătuș (resigned), Massimo Pedrazzini (caretaker)
- Assistant managers: Mihai Teja, Ioan Nagy, Massimo Pedrazzini
- Goalkeeping coach: Andrei Speriatu
- Fitness Coach: Yuksel Yesilova (resigned)
- Medic: Radu Paligora
- Masseur: Cătălin Fandel

=== Administration ===
- President: Valeriu Argăseală
- Vicepresident: Iulian Ghiorghișor
- Executive director: Ovidiu Costeșin
- Marketing director: Florin Cioran
- Press Officer: Cătălin Făiniși

=== Board Room ===
- Owner: George Becali
- Vice-chairman: Teia Sponte
- Board Room Members: Lucian Becali, Vasile Geambazi
- Censor: Victor Manole, Mariana Istudor
- Supplementary Censors: Virgil Laurențiu Găman, Maria Apostoiu
- Stock Holders: Vasile Geambazi (37%), Constantin Geambazi (30%), Cătălin Ciubotă (26%), Tomaida Bădescu (4%), Marius Ianuli (3%)

=== Youth Centre staff ===
- General manager: Leonard Strizu
- Coordinator: Gigel Gheorghe
- Physiotherapist: George Mărculescu
- Fitness Coach: Ciprian Prună
