= 2008–09 FC Argeș Pitești season =

FC Argeș
2008–09 season
- Chairman: Cornel Penescu
- Manager: Ionuț Badea
- Liga I: 10th (relegated)
- Cupa României: Round of 32
- Top goalscorer: League: Adrian Dulcea; Iulian Tameș (7); All: Adrian Dulcea; Iulian Tameș (7)
Home colours	Away colours

The 2008–09 FC Argeș Pitești season was the 44th season of FC Argeș Pitești in the Liga I, the top division in Romanian football.

The team finished the league in 10th position but was relegated due to allegations of referee bribery.

== Squad 2008–09 ==
=== Appearances and goals ===
As of October 8, 2008

No.	Pos	Nat	Player	Total		Liga I		Cupa României	
No.	Pos	Nat	Player	Apps	Goals	Apps	Goals	Apps	Goals
1	GK	(Romania) ROU	Ionuţ Boşneag	10	-13	10	-13	0	0
3	DF	(Romania) ROU	Daniel Lăcustă	10	0	10	0	0	0
4	DF	(Argentina) ARG	Elias Bazzi	10	0	10	0	0	0
9	MF	(Romania) ROU	Cristian Tănase	10	0	10	0	0	0
13	FW	(Romania) ROU	Adrian Dulcea	10	3	10	3	0	0
11	MF	(Romania) ROU	Cosmin Năstăsie	10	1	10	1	0	0
10	MF	(Romania) ROU	Iulian Tameş	9	4	9	4	0	0
20	FW	(Romania) ROU	Adrian Iordache	8	0	8	0	0	0
30	FW	(Ivory Coast) CIV	Youssouf Kamara	8	2	8	2	0	0
5	DF	(Romania) ROU	Daniel Bălaşa	7	0	7	0	0	0
7	MF	(Romania) ROU	Cătălin Doman	7	1	7	1	0	0
16	DF	(Romania) ROU	Daniel Ghiţă	7	0	7	0	0	0
2	DF	(Romania) ROU	Mircea Stan	6	0	6	0	0	0
8	MF	(Romania) ROU	Monel Cârstoiu	5	0	5	0	0	0
23	DF	(Romania) ROU	Ilie Poenaru	5	0	5	0	0	0
24	MF	(Romania) ROU	Vali Stan	5	0	5	0	0	0
21	FW	(Romania) ROU	Adrian Voiculeţ	4	3	4	3	0	0
18	MF	(Romania) ROU	Ionuţ Chirciu	2	0	2	0	0	0
25	DF	(Romania) ROU	Ionuţ Cazan	2	0	2	0	0	0
26	DF	(Romania) ROU	Andrei Bărbulescu	1	0	1	0	0	0
6	MF	(Romania) ROU	Iulian Crivac	1	0	1	0	0	0
19	MF	(Romania) ROU	Roberto Boboacă	1	0	1	0	0	0
		(Romania) ROU	Adrian Voicu	1	0	1	0	0	0
12	GK	(Romania) ROU	Valentin Coca	0	0	0	0	0	0
17	MF	(Romania) ROU	Sorin Bucuroaia	0	0	0	0	0	0

=== Disciplinary record ===
Disciplinary records for 2008–09 league and cup matches. Players with 1 card or more included only.
Last updated on October 8, 2008.

No.	Nat.	Player	Booked	(yellow card) (yellow-red card)	Sent off (straight red)
5	(Romania)	Daniel Bălaşa	2	0	1
4	(Argentina)	Elias Bazzi	3	0	0
25	(Romania)	Ionuţ Cazan	0	1	0
30	(Ivory Coast)	Youssouf Kamara	0	0	1
3	(Romania)	Daniel Lăcustă	2	0	0
10	(Romania)	Iulian Tameş	2	0	0
9	(Romania)	Cristian Tănase	1	0	0
8	(Romania)	Monel Cârstoiu	1	0	0
7	(Romania)	Cătălin Doman	1	0	0
13	(Romania)	Adrian Dulcea	1	0	0
26	(Romania)	Andrei Bărbulescu	1	0	0
16	(Romania)	Daniel Ghiţă	1	0	0
21	(Romania)	Adrian Voiculeţ	1	0	0

== Competitions ==
=== Liga I ===
==== League table ====
Pos	Team	Pld	W	D	L	GF	GA	GD	Pts	Qualification or relegation
8	Rapid București	34	16	7	11	44	34	+10	55 (Note: RAP 3–1 BRA; BRA 0–0 RAP)	
9	Brașov	34	14	13	7	35	25	+10	55	
10	Argeș Pitești (R)	34	12	8	14	41	47	−6	44	Relegation to Liga II (Note: Argeș Pitești were relegated to the Liga II due to allegations of referee bribery. Gaz Metan as best-placed relegated team were therefore spared from relegation.)
11	Pandurii Târgu Jiu	34	11	10	13	27	36	−9	43	
12	Oțelul Galați	34	11	7	16	37	48	−11	40	

Source: LPF (in Romanian)
Rules for classification: 1) points; 2) head-to-head points; 3) head-to-head goal difference; 4) head-to-head goals scored; 5) goal difference; 6) number of goals scored.
(R) Relegated

==== Results summary ====
Overall								Home						Away					
Pld	W	D	L	GF	GA	GD	Pts	W	D	L	GF	GA	GD	W	D	L	GF	GA	GD
34	12	8	14	41	47	−6	44	9	7	1	28	14	+14	3	1	13	13	33	−20

Source: RomanianSoccer.ro

==== Results by round ====
Round	1	2	3	4	5	6	7	8	9	10	11	12	13	14	15	16	17	18	19	20	21	22	23	24	25	26	27	28	29	30	31	32	33	34
Ground	H	A	H	A	A	H	A	H	A	H	A	H	A	H	A	H	A	A	H	A	H	H	A	H	A	H	A	H	A	H	A	H	A	H
Result	D	L	W	L	L	W	W	D	W	D	W	W	L	W	L	W	L	L	D	L	D	W	D	D	L	W	L	D	L	W	L	L	L	W
Position	9	13	10	14	14	13	11	12	9	9	7	5	8	6	7	4	8	8	10	11	10	10	10	10	10	10	10	10	10	10	10	10	10	10

Source: RomanianSoccer.ro
A = Away; H = Home; W = Win; D = Draw; L = Loss

==== Matches ====
26 July 2008 Matchday 1	Argeș Pitești	1–1	FC Timişoara	Piteşti
19:30 EET	Tameş (yellow card) 38'; Dulcea 42'		Sretenović (yellow card) 30'; Alexa (yellow card) 38'; Magera 45'; Art. Karamian (yellow card) 62'; Arm. Karamian (yellow card) 90'	Stadium: Nicolae Dobrin; Attendance: 5,000; Referee: Aurel Bogaciu

2 August 2008 Matchday 2	Unirea Urziceni	3–2	Argeș Pitești	Urziceni
19:30 EET	Mara 29', 74' (pen.); Apostol (yellow card) 40'; Rusescu 46'; Bordeanu (yellow card) 59'; Brandán (yellow card) 90+3'		Kamara 9'; Dulcea 31'; Bălaşa (yellow card) 38'; Bazzi (yellow card) 55'	Stadium: Tineretului; Attendance: 4,000; Referee: Alexandru Deaconu

10 August 2008 Matchday 3	Argeș Pitești	1–0	FC Brașov	Piteşti
21:30 EET	Kamara 5'; Ghiţă (yellow card) 87'; Cazan (red card) 90'		Sburlea (yellow card) 26'; Ionescu (yellow card) 90'	Stadium: Nicolae Dobrin; Attendance: 10,000; Referee: Marius Martiş

16 August 2008 Matchday 4	Steaua București	2–0	Argeș Pitești	Bucharest
20:30 EET	Nicoliţă 4', (yellow card) 33'; Golański (yellow card) 67'; Stancu 74'; Lovin (yellow card) 66' (yellow-red card) 81'		Bărbulescu (yellow card) 34'; Kamara (red card) 35'; Cârstoiu (yellow card) 50'	Stadium: Ghencea; Attendance: 12,000; Referee: Teodor Crăciunescu

25 August 2008 Matchday 5	Pandurii Târgu Jiu	3–1	Argeș Pitești	Târgu Jiu
21:00 EET	Vasilache (yellow card) 25', (goal) 69' (pen.); Chibulcutean 28'; Piţurcă 32'; Iordache (yellow card) 37'; Mândrean (yellow card) 42'; Popete (yellow card) 31' (yellow-red card) 45'; Păcurar (yellow card) 47'; Piţurcă (red card) 80'		Doman (yellow card) 34', (goal) 51'	Stadium: Tudor Vladimirescu; Attendance: 5,000; Referee: Sorin Corpodean

29 August 2008 Matchday 6	Argeș Pitești	2–0	Gaz Metan	Piteşti
19:45 EET	Tameş (yellow card) 15'; Iordache (yellow card) 43'; Năstăsie 70'; Bălaşa (yellow card) 75'; Voiculeţ 80'; Voiculeţ (yellow card) 80'		Zaharia (yellow card) 40'	Stadium: Nicolae Dobrin; Attendance: 2,500; Referee: Ionică Serea

12 September 2008 Matchday 7	CS Otopeni	1–2	Argeș Pitești	Ploieşti
20:00 EET	Sone (yellow card) 14'; Ganea 68'; Mărgărit (yellow card) 69'; Ivan (yellow card) 90'		Tameş 3', 43' (pen.), (yellow card) 21'; Tănase (yellow card) 62'	Stadium: Astra; Attendance: 1,000; Referee: Tiberiu Lajos

20 September 2008 Matchday 8	Argeș Pitești	1–1	Gloria Buzău	Piteşti
19:00 EET	Lăcustă (yellow card) 32'; Bălaşa (yellow card) 48'; Voiculeţ 90'		Tiago (yellow card) 19'; Liţu (yellow card) 22'; Fallardo 72'	Stadium: Nicolae Dobrin; Attendance: 1,500; Referee: Lucian Dan

28 September 2008 Matchday 9	Rapid București	1–3	Argeș Pitești	Bucharest
21:00 EET	Pitbull 38'; Vella (yellow card) 45'; Pitbull (yellow card) 68'		Dulcea 11'; Tameş 23'; Lăcustă (yellow card) 39'; Bazzi (yellow card) 53'; Dulcea (yellow card) 90+1'	Stadium: Giuleşti; Attendance: 3,000; Referee: Robert Dumitru

3 October 2008 Matchday 10	Argeș Pitești	1–1	Universitatea Craiova	Piteşti
19:00 EET	Tameş 35'; Voiculeţ (yellow card) 81'; Bălaşa (red card) 84'; Bazzi (yellow card) 87'		Găman (yellow card) 35'; Costea 66'; Woobay (yellow card) 67'; Mitchell (yellow card) 69'; Bornescu (red card) 83'; Baird (red card) 84'	Stadium: Nicolae Dobrin; Attendance: 8,500; Referee: Aurelian Bogaciu

19 October 2008 Matchday 11	FC Vaslui	0–1	Argeș Pitești	Vaslui
19:00 EET			Tameş 87'	Stadium: Municipal; Attendance: 4,500; Referee: Aurelian Bogaciu

24 October 2008 Matchday 12	Argeș Pitești	3–0	Politehnica Iaşi	Piteşti
				Stadium: Nicolae Dobrin

31 October 2008 Matchday 13	Gloria Bistriţa	2–0	Argeș Pitești	Bistriţa
				Stadium: Gloria

8 November 2008 Matchday 14	Argeș Pitești	3–0	Farul Constanţa	Piteşti
				Stadium: Nicolae Dobrin

16 November 2008 Matchday 15	CFR Cluj	2–0	Argeș Pitești	Cluj-Napoca
				Stadium: Dr. Constantin Rădulescu

23 November 2008 Matchday 16	Argeș Pitești	3–2	Oțelul Galați	Piteşti
				Stadium: Nicolae Dobrin

29 November 2008 Matchday 17	Dinamo București	2–0	Argeș Pitești	Bucharest
				Stadium: Dinamo

28 February 2009 Matchday 18	FC Timişoara	2–1	Argeș Pitești	Timișoara
				Stadium: Dan Păltinişanu

8 March 2009 Matchday 19	Argeș Pitești	0–0	Unirea Urziceni	Piteşti
				Stadium: Nicolae Dobrin

15 March 2009 Matchday 20	FC Brașov	1–0	Argeș Pitești	Braşov
				Stadium: Silviu Ploeşteanu

20 March 2009 Matchday 21	Argeș Pitești	2–2	Steaua București	Piteşti
				Stadium: Nicolae Dobrin

4 April 2009 Matchday 22	Argeș Pitești	2–1	Pandurii Târgu Jiu	Piteşti
				Stadium: Nicolae Dobrin

8 April 2009 Matchday 23	Gaz Metan	2–2	Argeș Pitești	Mediaş
				Stadium: Municipal

12 April 2009 Matchday 24	Argeș Pitești	1–1	CS Otopeni	Piteşti
				Stadium: Nicolae Dobrin

17 April 2009 Matchday 25	Gloria Buzău	3–1	Argeș Pitești	Buzău
				Stadium: Municipal

21 April 2009 Matchday 26	Argeș Pitești	1–0	Rapid București	Piteşti
				Stadium: Nicolae Dobrin

26 April 2009 Matchday 27	Universitatea Craiova	1–0	Argeș Pitești	Craiova
				Stadium: Extensiv

3 May 2009 Matchday 28	Argeș Pitești	0–0	FC Vaslui	Piteşti
				Stadium: Nicolae Dobrin

6 May 2009 Matchday 29	Politehnica Iaşi	4–0	Argeș Pitești	Iaşi
				Stadium: Emil Alexandrescu

10 May 2009 Matchday 30	Argeș Pitești	2–1	Gloria Bistriţa	Piteşti
				Stadium: Nicolae Dobrin

16 May 2009 Matchday 31	Farul Constanţa	2–0	Argeș Pitești	Constanţa
				Stadium: Farul

24 May 2009 Matchday 32	Argeș Pitești	0–2	CFR Cluj	Piteşti
				Stadium: Nicolae Dobrin

31 May 2009 Matchday 33	Oțelul Galați	2–0	Argeș Pitești	Galați
				Stadium: Oțelul

10 June 2009 Matchday 34	Argeș Pitești	5–2	Dinamo București	Piteşti
				Stadium: Nicolae Dobrin

=== Cupa României ===
15 October 2008 Round of 32	Internațional Curtea de Argeș	2–1	Argeș Pitești	Piteşti
				Stadium: Tineretului
