= Lăcustă =

Lăcustă is a Romanian surname. Notable people with the surname include:

- Florian Dan Lăcustă (born 1977), Romanian footballer
- Larisa Lăcustă (born 1979), Romanian swimmer
