= Bogdan Stancu =

Romanian footballer

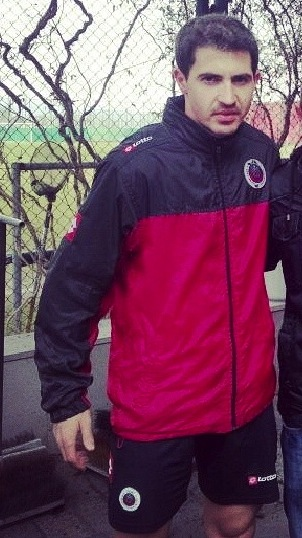
- Stancu in 2013

Personal information
- Full name: Bogdan Sorin Stancu
- Date of birth: 28 June 1987 (age 39)
- Place of birth: Pitești, Romania
- Height: 1.83 m (6 ft 0 in)
- Position: Centre-forward

Youth career
- 1998–2005: Argeș Pitești

Senior career*
Years	Team	Apps	(Gls)
2005–2006	Argeș Pitești	7	(0)
2006	→ Dacia Mioveni (loan)	12	(3)
2006–2008	Unirea Urziceni	49	(11)
2008–2011	Steaua București	72	(33)
2011–2012	Galatasaray	14	(2)
2011–2012	→ Orduspor (loan)	31	(10)
2012–2013	Orduspor	30	(10)
2013–2017	Gençlerbirliği	91	(34)
2017–2019	Bursaspor	50	(8)
2019–2021	Gençlerbirliği	62	(26)
2021–2022	Eyüpspor	14	(3)
Total		432	(140)

International career
2006–2009	Romania U21	15	(5)
2010–2017	Romania	53	(14)
- * Club domestic league appearances and goals

Bogdan Sorin Stancu (Romanian pronunciation: [boɡˈdan soˈrin ˈstaŋku]; born 28 June 1987) is a Romanian former professional footballer who played as a forward.

Stancu started his professional career at Argeș Pitești, and had a brief loan spell at Mioveni. Due to an irregularity in his contract he left the club and joined Unirea Urziceni. In the summer of 2008, after two years at Urziceni, he moved to Steaua București and finished his first season as Steaua's top scorer with 11 goals. In the first half of the 2010–11 season Stancu scored 16 times in 27 games after which Galatasaray paid €5 million to secure his services. After a not so successful stint at the Turkish club, he joined Orduspor. After they were relegated from the Süper Lig, Stancu moved to Gençlerbirliği for an undisclosed fee.

At international level, his career started in 2010 and he played for Euro 2016.

== Club career ==
=== FC Argeș ===
Stancu was discovered at a trial by coach Mihai Ianovschi in 1998, who took him to the junior team of Argeș Pitești.

In 2001, at the age of 14, Stancu was at the youth academy of FC Argeș when his father died due to heart failure. He was deeply affected by the loss and quit football for a few months.

In 2005, he was brought to the first team by Sorin Cârțu. After a short period he was sent to Dacia Mioveni in Divizia B, where he had a contract of only $1000 per month and a clause by which he earned $1 for every minute played for Mioveni. His team won a few games with Stancu as their only goalscorer. After a season where he scored 3 goals in 12 matches, he returned to FC Argeș and made his debut in Divizia A at the age of 19 against former champions Steaua București, game which ended as a goalless draw.

In the summer of 2006, Sorin Cârțu resigned from the club and former Italian star Giuseppe Giannini was appointed as the new manager of Argeș Pitești. After two weeks of training he decided that Stancu and another player, Robert Neagoe, should be released. He ended up making only seven appearances for his team that season. Stancu was sent once again to Dacia Mioveni during the pre-season but after a few days, Gigi Nețoiu brought him to Unirea Urziceni. In May 2008, after three years at Unirea, Stancu was transferred to Steaua București. Local media reported the fee to be in the region of €1 million.

=== Steaua Bucharest ===
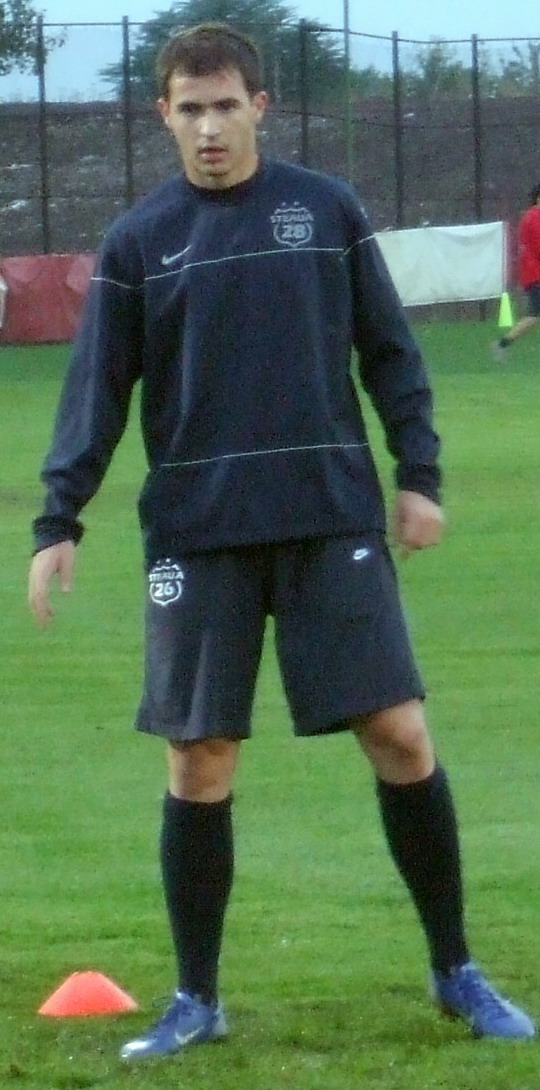
Stancu training with Steaua Bucharest in 2008

==== 2008–09 season ====
On 30 June 2008, Stancu played his first match in Steaua's shirt in a friendly against Maribor, scoring the first goal. He scored his second goal On 26 July against Roma in a friendly game, Steaua won 3–1.

On 23 August 2008, Stancu scored his first double for Steaua against Gloria Bistrița in Liga I. In his first five Liga I matches for Steaua he scored four goals. He managed to score four goals in several winter break friendly matches. After the winter break he scored again in the first match against Vaslui. On 14 March 2009, he scored in the sixth minute of the match against Politehnica Iași, leading Steaua to its victory. At his first season at Steaua was top scorer with 11 goals, along with Greek Pantelis Kapetanos.

==== 2009–10 season ====
Stancu started the new season scoring the second goal for his team against Újpest in the second qualifying round of UEFA Europa League, on 16 July 2009, making the score 2–0 for Steaua București. He scored the third and final goal against Motherwell after being served perfectly by Rafał Grzelak. On 6 August 2009, he scored two more goals against the same Motherwell and help his team qualify in the Europa League playoffs. After his great performances in Europa League he was rewarded by Răzvan Lucescu with a call-up in the Romania national team against Hungary. However, during a league match he got injured and Lucescu dropped him from the team. Two weeks later he scored another two goals against St Patrick's Athletic. In nine European matches he scored six goals. He was sent off on round 4 against Oțelul Galați in the 75th minute after receiving a second yellow card. At end of season he was top scorer of team in Europa League with six goals.

==== 2010–11 season ====
On 25 July 2010, Stancu netted the second goal in his first start of the season in a 1–2 away win against Universitatea Cluj. In the second round he scored the equalizer in the 66th minute against Universitatea Craiova, after Valentin Iliev opened the score, 12 minutes later his teammate Romeo Surdu, scored the second goal helping the team to a 2–1 home win. In the 4th round he scored twice against Victoria, first goal in 24th minute and the victory goal in the 67th minute, Steaua winning home with 2–1. In his first European match of the season he scored the only goal in a 1–0 match against Grasshoppers. In the 5th round he scored against FC Vaslui, he scored second goal of the match in 46th minute, Steaua winning with 3–0. On round 10 scored two goals against Sportul Studențesc in a 4–2 victory. On next two rounds scored three goals, one against Dinamo București and two against Pandurii Târgu Jiu in a 2–0 victory. In matchday 4 at Europa League, Stancu scored two goals against Utrecht in a 3–1 victory, both goals came in the 52nd and 53rd minute. On round 17, Stancu scored twice against CFR Cluj. The next match day Stancu scored again in a 3–0 win against Universitatea Cluj.

=== Galatasaray ===
On 21 January 2011, Stancu was sold to Turkish club Galatasaray for €5 million. He signed a four-and-a-half-year contract worth €5,2 million

He scored on his first Turkish Cup match for Galatasaray, a 3–2 loss against Gaziantepspor in the first leg of the 2010–11 Turkish Cup quarterfinals which he had scored the second goal with a long shot. Stancu then scored in his second regular match in the Turkish League too, in the 4–2 win against Eskişehirspor. On the ninth of May Stancu scored a goal in Galatasaray's victory against Kasımpaşa. He finished the season with 3 goals in 16 appearances.

=== Orduspor ===
On 23 August 2011, Stancu was loaned to Orduspor on a one-year loan deal worth €350,000. Fatih Terim decided to start the 2011–12 season with the newly arrived striker Johan Elmander and Milan Baroš.

He scored four goals in his first seven games for Orduspor. In the last week of January 2012 he was chosen player of the week in the Süper Lig by Gazete Futbol due to his performance against Eskişehirspor. On 1 February he opened the score in a match against Ankaragücü. He continued his goalscoring form by scoring in the 3–2 victory against Antalyaspor on 12 February. On 11 March Stancu scored a goal in a game against Beşiktaş to eventually earn a draw for Orduspor. Then he assisted Javito's goal, in a game against Sivasspor, which finished in a 1–1 draw.

At the end of the year Stancu joined Orduspor for a fee of €2.5 million. He later signed a four-year contract worth €1.2 million per year.

=== Gençlerbirliği ===
On 25 July 2013, after Orduspor was relegated from the Süper Lig Stancu moved to Gençlerbirliği for an undisclosed fee. He made an immediate impact at Gençlerbirliği, scoring seven league goals in his first half season, the last of which was against his former club Galatasaray.

=== Bursaspor ===
On 19 January 2017, it was reported that he signed a two-and-a-half-year deal with Bursaspor.

=== Return to Gençlerbirliği ===
On 21 January 2019, he returned to former club he signed a one-and-a-half-year deal he wore number 17 on his return and in 2019–20 season he switched to number 9 shirt.

=== Eyüpspor ===
On 18 June 2021, Stancu signed a 1+1 year contract with Eyüpspor.

== International career ==
Stancu is an ex Romania U-21 player, gathering 15 appearances and scoring 5 goals from 2006 to 2009.

On 3 September 2010, he made his debut for the Romania national team in a game against Albania coming on in the 64th minute to replace Daniel Niculae. He also scored his first goal for his national side 16 minutes into his first game. On 29 February 2012, Stancu scored from a header against Uruguay to earn Romania a draw. Stancu's first tournament goal came in the opening game of UEFA Euro 2016 against the hosts France. He netted a penalty to equalise at 1–1, although France did go on to eventually win 2–1 with Dimitri Payet scoring a winning goal in the 89th minute. He also successfully converted another penalty in the second group game against Switzerland, with the match finishing 1–1.

On 21 February 2018, Stancu officially announced his retirement from the national team at 30 years of age after the unsuccessful qualifying campaign.

== Career statistics ==
=== Club ===
Appearances and goals by club, season and competition
Club	Season	League			National cup (Note: Includes Cupa României, Turkish Cup)		Europe		Other		Total	
Club	Season	Division	Apps	Goals	Apps	Goals	Apps	Goals	Apps	Goals	Apps	Goals
Argeș Pitești	2005–06	Divizia A	7	0	0	0	–		–		7	0
Dacia Mioveni (loan)	2005–06	Divizia B	12	3	–		–		–		12	3
Unirea Urziceni	2006–07	Liga I	20	5	2	0	–		–		22	5
Unirea Urziceni	2007–08	Liga I	29	6	2	0	–		–		31	6
Unirea Urziceni	Total		49	11	4	0	0	0	0	0	53	11
Steaua București	2008–09	Liga I	29	11	1	0	5 (Note: Appearances in UEFA Champions League)	0	–		35	11
Steaua București	2009–10	Liga I	25	8	1	0	9 (Note: Appearances in UEFA Europa League)	6	–		35	14
Steaua București	2010–11	Liga I	18	13	1	0	8	3	–		27	16
Steaua București	Total		72	32	3	0	22	9	0	0	97	41
Galatasaray	2010–11	Süper Lig	14	2	2	1	–		–		16	3
Orduspor (loan)	2011–12	Süper Lig	31	10	1	0	–		–		32	10
Orduspor	2012–13	Süper Lig	30	10	3	1	–		–		33	11
Gençlerbirliği	2013–14	Süper Lig	28	13	0	0	–		–		28	13
Gençlerbirliği	2014–15	Süper Lig	24	9	3	1	–		–		27	10
Gençlerbirliği	2015–16	Süper Lig	29	10	1	0	–		–		30	10
Gençlerbirliği	2016–17	Süper Lig	10	2	0	0	–		–		10	2
Gençlerbirliği	Total		91	34	4	1	0	0	0	0	95	35
Bursaspor	2016–17	Süper Lig	12	0	1	0	–		–		13	0
Bursaspor	2017–18	Süper Lig	31	8	1	0	–		–		32	8
Bursaspor	2018–19	Süper Lig	7	0	1	0	–		–		8	0
Bursaspor	Total		50	8	3	0	–		–		53	8
Gençlerbirliği	2018–19	TFF 1. Lig	14	5	–		–		–		14	5
Gençlerbirliği	2019–20	Süper Lig	24	14	0	0	–		–		24	14
Gençlerbirliği	2020–21	Süper Lig	24	7	0	0	–		–		24	7
Gençlerbirliği	Total		62	26	0	0	0	0	0	0	62	26
Eyüpspor	2021–22	TFF 1. Lig	14	3	0	0	–		–		14	3
Career total			432	139	20	3	22	9	0	0	474	151

=== International ===
Appearances and goals by national team and year
National team	Year	Apps	Goals
Romania	2010	5	1
Romania	2011	8	0
Romania	2012	5	1
Romania	2013	11	4
Romania	2014	4	2
Romania	2015	4	1
Romania	2016	12	3
Romania	2017	4	2
Total		53	14

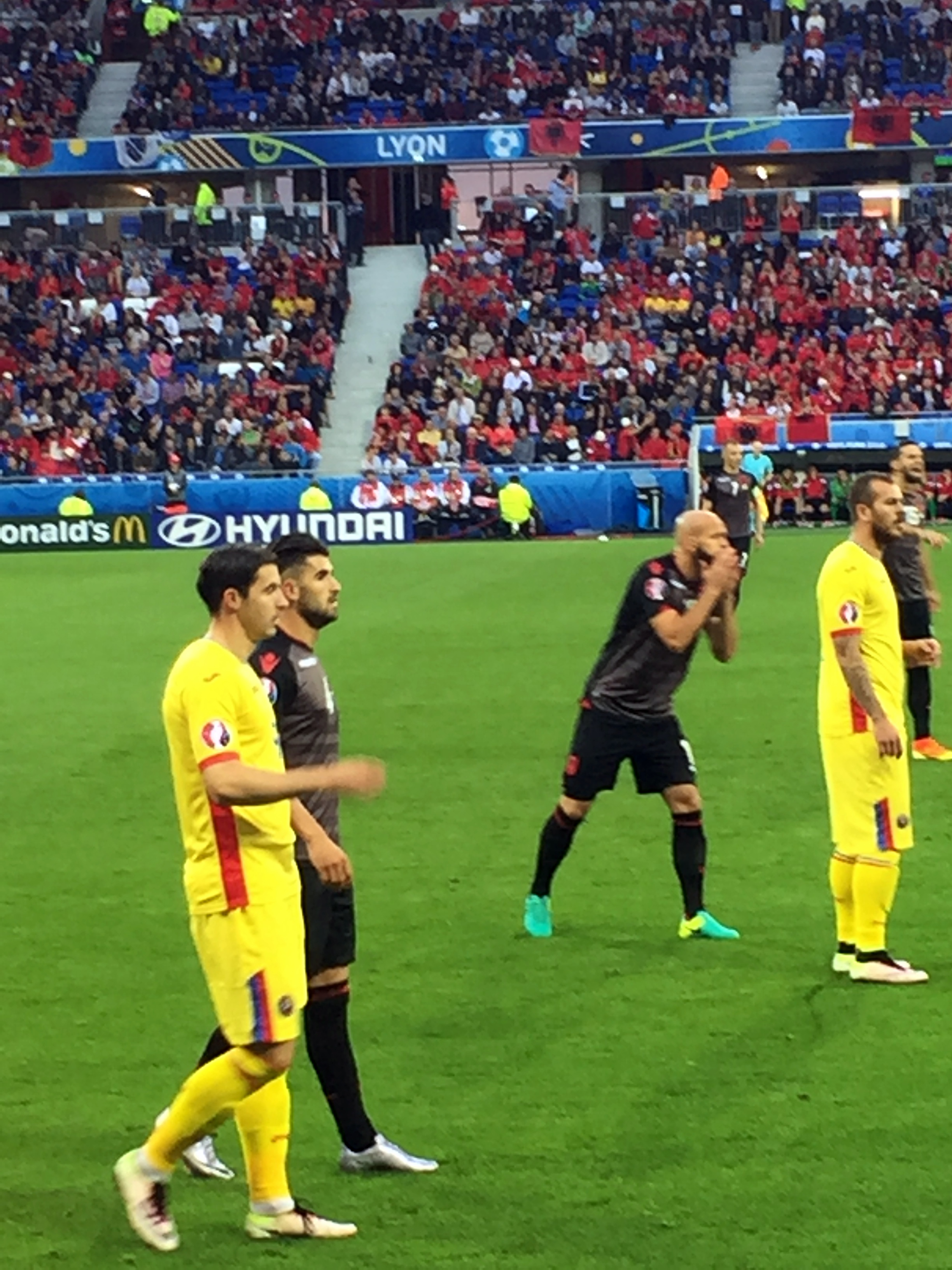
Stancu (left in yellow) with Romania at Euro 2016.

Scores and results list Romania's goal tally first, score column indicates score after each Stancu goal.

List of international goals scored by Bogdan Stancu
No.	Date	Venue	Opponent	Score	Result	Competition
1	3 September 2010	Stadionul Ceahlăul, Piatra Neamț, Romania	Albania	1–0	1–1	UEFA Euro 2012 qualification
2	29 February 2012	Arena Națională, Bucharest, Romania	Uruguay	1–1	1–1	Friendly
3	6 February 2013	Estadio Ciudad, Málaga, Spain	Australia	2–2	3–2	Friendly
4	14 August 2013	Arena Națională, Bucharest, Romania	Slovakia	1–0	1–1	Friendly
5	11 October 2013	Estadi Comunal, Andorra la Vella, Andorra	Andorra	2–0	4–0	2014 FIFA World Cup qualification
6	15 November 2013	Karaiskakis Stadium, Piraeus, Greece	Greece	1–1	1–3	2014 FIFA World Cup qualification
7	14 October 2014	Olympiastadion, Helsinki, Finland	Finland	1–0	2–0	UEFA Euro 2016 qualification
8	14 October 2014	Olympiastadion, Helsinki, Finland	Finland	2–0	2–0	UEFA Euro 2016 qualification
9	17 November 2015	Stadio Renato Dall'Ara, Bologna, Italy	Italy	1–0	2–2	Friendly
10	10 June 2016	Stade de France, Saint-Denis, France	France	1–1	1–2	UEFA Euro 2016
11	15 June 2016	Parc des Princes, Paris, France	Switzerland	1–0	1–1	UEFA Euro 2016
12	8 October 2016	Vazgen Sargsyan Republican Stadium, Yerevan, Armenia	Armenia	1–0	5–0	2018 FIFA World Cup qualification
13	10 June 2017	National Stadium, Warsaw, Poland	Poland	1–3	1–3	2018 FIFA World Cup qualification
14	13 June 2017	Cluj Arena, Cluj-Napoca, Romania	Chile	1–2	3–2	Friendly

== Honours ==
Unirea Urziceni

- Cupa României runner-up: 2007–08

Steaua Bucureşti

- Cupa României: 2010–11

Individual

- Gazeta Sporturilor Romanian Footballer of the Year runner-up: 2010
