= Pantelis Kapetanos =

Greek footballer and manager (born 1983)

- Kapetanos playing for Steaua București

Personal information
- Date of birth: 8 June 1983 (age 43)
- Place of birth: Ptolemaida, Greece
- Height: 1.88 m (6 ft 2 in)
- Position: Striker

Youth career
- –1999: Kozani

Senior career*
Years	Team	Apps	(Gls)
1999–2002	Kozani	54	(11)
2002–2005	Iraklis	75	(10)
2006–2008	AEK Athens	27	(4)
2008–2010	Steaua București	65	(27)
2011–2013	CFR Cluj	53	(18)
2013–2014	Steaua București	8	(3)
2014–2016	Skoda Xanthi	58	(13)
2016–2017	Veria	24	(6)
2018–2019	Makedonikos Foufas		
Total		364	(92)

International career
2003–2005	Greece U21	15	(1)
2010	Greece	4	(0)

Managerial career
- 2019–2021: Kozani (assistant)
- 2022: Makedonikos Foufas (assistant)
- 2023–2025: Makedonikos Foufas
- * Club domestic league appearances and goals

Pantelis Kapetanos (Greek: Παντελής Καπετάνος; born 8 June 1983) is a Greek professional football manager and former player.

== Club career ==
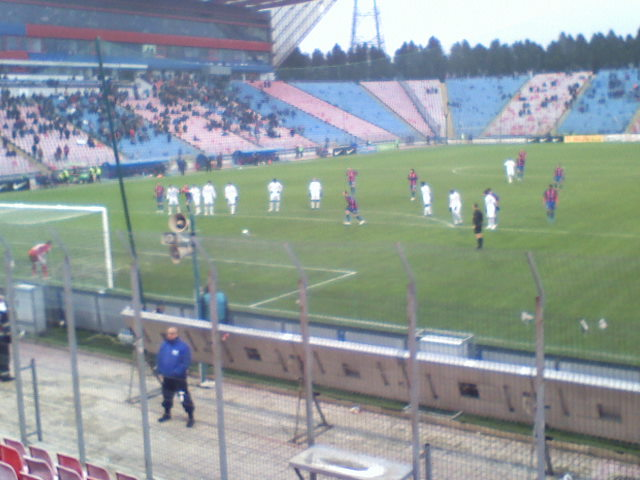
Kapetanos preparing to take a penalty during a match with Internaţional Curtea de Argeş

=== Early career ===
Kapetanos started his in football career at Kozani. There he was spotted by the manager of Iraklis, Eugène Gerards, and thus in 2002 he was transferred to the club of Thessaloniki. He was distinguished for his strength in the air, but at the same time he was also a heavy player, without particular technical qualities and a big weakness at finishing. At Iraklis, he made quite good appearances that earned him a call to Greece U21. On 19 January 2006 Kapetanos was transferred to AEK Athens for a fee of €400,000. Gerards, who was the technical director of the club, was involved in this transfer.

=== AEK Athens ===
Kapetanos did not manage to meet the expectations that were created with his acquisition, as his presence at AEK was indulgently mediocre and was combined with a steady decreasing course in both performance and appearances. Even though he began his spell as a starter, in his second season he gradually lost his place in the starting line-up to Leonidas Kampantais. On 18 March 2007 in an away match against Kerkyra, he delivered a memorable performance as, after scoring the winner, he also missed a huge double chance. At the 58th minute of the match, he unintentionally chipped the opposing goalkeeper with a volley, with the ball taking a strange course and bouncing on the goal line before returning to him. He then attempted a second volley, which was deflected by the goalkeeper. In the following season his few appearances with the club made him also compete with the youth team in order not to be completely out of the form.

=== Steaua București ===
On 8 July 2008 Kapetanos was released from AEK and he joined Steaua București on a free transfer in a one-year contract. In his first season at Steaua, Kapetanos was the club's top scorer with Bogdan Stancu, scoring 11 goals. The Steaua board extended his contract for two years, and he finished the 2009–10 season as the club's leading scorer in Liga I, with 15 goals, and in all competitions, with 19 goals. In January 2011 his contract with Steaua was terminated, as the management did not intend to pay his high salary.

=== CFR Cluj ===
Although Steaua allowed Kapetanos to leave on a free transfer, they did not want to allow him to sign for another Liga I club. He joined CFR Cluj in January 2011, signing a three years and a half contract.

Due to the fact that he previously had to undergo surgery to fix a meniscus tear, he was sidelined for his first months at CFR Cluj. Kapetanos had a much better 2011–12 season, scoring 12 goals to help CFR Cluj claim their third title in five years.

On 14 July 2012, Kapetanos scored a late goal in extra time to help his team reach the Penalty shoot-out against Dinamo București in the 2012 Romanian Supercup. CFR Cluj lost at the penalty kicks and the trophy went to Dinamo.

=== Second spell in Steaua București ===
On 3 September 2013, Steaua București announced that they had reached an agreement with CFR Cluj for the transfer of Pantelis Kapetanos.

=== Skoda Xanthi ===
On 11 July 2014, after six years, Kapetanos returned to Greece by joining Skoda Xanthi on a two-year contract, as a free agent.

Kapetanos as a reserved for the Greek Football Cup final, pulled one goal back for Skoda Xanthi in the 87th minute from close range.

=== Veria ===
After being released on a free transfer from Xanthi, Kapetanos signed a one-year contract to Veria. After Veria's relegation he left the club.

After spending 6 months in Veria, Kapetanos left Veria in January 2017. In July 2018, there were rumors for his transfer to Iraklis.

== International career ==
Kapetanos was called up by Greece for the first time ahead of its international friendly against Senegal. He was included in the squad for the 2010 FIFA World Cup, and made his World Cup debut in a group stage match against South Korea.

== Career statistics ==
=== Club ===
Club	Season	League			National Cup (Note: Includes Greek Cup, Cupa României)		Europe		Other		Total	
Club	Season	Division	Apps	Goals	Apps	Goals	Apps	Goals	Apps	Goals	Apps	Goals
Kozani	1999–00	Gamma Ethniki	8	2	1	0	–		–		9	2
Kozani	2000–01	Gamma Ethniki	24	5	2	1	–		–		26	6
Kozani	2001–02	Delta Ethniki	22	4	1	0	–		–		23	4
Kozani	Total		54	11	4	1	–		–		58	12
Iraklis	2002–03	Alpha Ethniki	22	5	2	0	1 (Note: Appearances in UEFA Cup)	0	–		25	5
Iraklis	2003–04	Alpha Ethniki	21	1	4	3	–		–		25	4
Iraklis	2004–05	Alpha Ethniki	18	3	3	3	–		–		21	6
Iraklis	2005–06	Alpha Ethniki	14	1	1	0	–		–		15	1
Iraklis	Total		75	10	10	6	1	0	–		86	16
AEK Athens	2005–06	Alpha Ethniki	10	1	4	0	0	0	–		14	1
AEK Athens	2006–07	Super League Greece	15	3	1	0	7 (Note: Five appearances and one goal in UEFA Champions League, two appearances in UEFA Cup)	1	–		23	4
AEK Athens	2007–08	Super League Greece	2	0	1	1	0	0	–		3	1
AEK Athens	Total		27	4	6	1	7	1	–		40	6
Steaua București	2008–09	Liga I	23	11	0	0	4 (Note: Appearances in UEFA Champions League)	0	–		27	11
Steaua București	2009–10	Liga I	30	15	1	2	8 (Note: Appearances in UEFA Europa League)	2	–		39	19
Steaua București	2010–11	Liga I	12	1	2	0	3	1	–		17	2
Steaua București	Total		65	27	3	2	15	3	–		83	32
CFR Cluj	2010–11	Liga I	2	0	–		–		–		2	0
CFR Cluj	2011–12	Liga I	28	12	1	0	–		–		29	12
CFR Cluj	2012–13	Liga I	20	6	2	0	11 (Note: Ten appearances and three goals in UEFA Champions League, one appearance in UEFA Europa League)	3	1 (Note: Appearance in Supercupa României)	1	34	10
CFR Cluj	2013–14	Liga I	3	0	—		—		–		3	0
CFR Cluj	Total		53	18	3	0	11	3	1	1	68	22
Steaua București	2013–14	Liga I	8	3	2	2	5	0	–		15	5
Skoda Xanthi	2014–15	Super League Greece	31	11	10	1	–		–		41	12
Skoda Xanthi	2015–16	Super League Greece	27	2	2	1	–		–		29	3
Skoda Xanthi	Total		58	13	12	2	–		–		70	15
Veria	2016–17	Super League Greece	24	6	0	0	–		–		24	6
Makedonikos Foufas	2018–19	Gamma Ethniki	?	?	–		–		–		?	?
Career total			364	92	40	14	39	7	1	1	444	114

=== International ===
Appearances and goals by national team and year
National team	Year	Apps	Goals
Greece
Greece	2010	4	0
Total		4	0

== Personal life ==
He is the elder brother of Kostas Kapetanos He is married to fellow Greek, Fotini Dougali and they have three children together. His older child, Giannis, is also a footballer, who plays as a striker for Super League Greece 2 club Panargiakos.

== Honours ==
CFR Cluj

- Liga I: 2011–12

Steaua București

- Liga I: 2013–14
