= Thiago Tremonti =

Brazilian footballer

Personal information
- Full name: Thiago Tremonti
- Date of birth: June 8, 1985 (age 41)
- Place of birth: Ribeirão Preto, Brazil
- Height: 1.71 m (5 ft 7 in)
- Position: Forward

Senior career*
Years	Team	Apps	(Gls)
2005–2008	Paulista		
2008–2010	Pandurii Târgu Jiu	32	(2)
2010	Americana		
2011	Grêmio Barueri	1	(0)
- * Club domestic league appearances and goals as of 15:00, 17 March 2010 ‡ National team caps and goals as of 15 July 2008

Thiago Tremonti (born 8 June 1985) is a football midfielder from Brazil.

He had formerly played for Pandurii Târgu Jiu in Romanian League Liga I.
