= Ovidiu Petre =

Romanian footballer (born 1982)

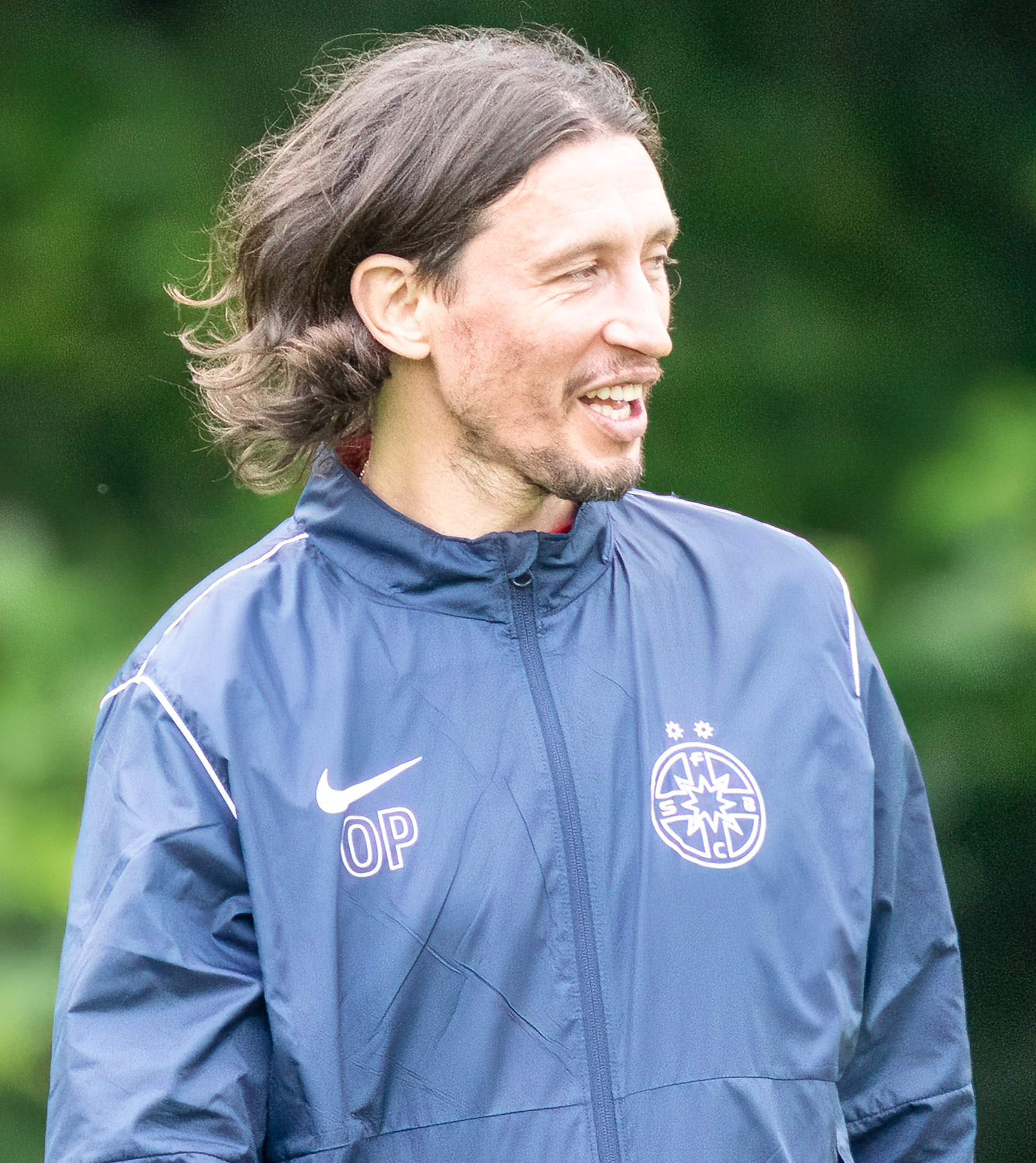
- Petre in 2023

Personal information
- Date of birth: 22 March 1982 (age 44)
- Place of birth: Bucharest, Romania
- Height: 1.88 m (6 ft 2 in)
- Position: Defensive midfielder

Youth career
- –2000: Naţional București

Senior career*
Years	Team	Apps	(Gls)
2000–2003	Naţional București	57	(2)
2003–2005	Galatasaray	27	(1)
2005–2006	Politehnica Timişoara	33	(5)
2006–2010	Steaua București	74	(5)
2010–2011	Al-Nassr	16	(4)
2011–2012	Modena	19	(1)
2013–2015	ACS Poli Timişoara	45	(0)
Total		271	(18)

International career
2001–2002	Romania U21	7	(0)
2002–2009	Romania	24	(1)

Managerial career
- 2018–2019: ACS Poli Timișoara (sporting director)
- 2019–2024: FCSB (video analyst)
- * Club domestic league appearances and goals

Ovidiu Petre (born 22 March 1982) is a Romanian former professional footballer who played as a defensive midfielder. He made 24 appearances for the Romania national team, scoring twice. Considered a veritable talent in his early playing years, he had his career hindered by numerous knee injuries.

== Club career ==
=== FC National (2000–03) ===
Petre began his professional career at FC National Bucharest during the 1999–2000 season, making his first team debut in a 3–2 defeat to Rapid București on 22 April 2000. The first two seasons spent at FC National did not bring him many professional successes, making only ten appearances. In the 2001–02 season FC National were so close to winning the championship. Petre improved his performances and became an essential player for his team. In the European Cups, Petre played six matches for FC National in the UEFA Cup.

=== Galatasaray (2003–05) ===
In 2003, he was transferred to Galatasaray. The Turkish team paid €1 million for the midfielder. He made his Süper Lig debut on 13 September 2003 in a 1–0 loss against Konyaspor. He played four matches with Galatasaray in the season 2003–04 in UEFA Champions League. After almost two seasons at Galatasaray, Petre did not confirm his skills and he was transferred at the middle of the 2004–05 season to FCU Politehnica Timişoara.

=== Poli Timișoara (2005–06) ===
After one season spent at Timişoara, the coach that properly launched Ovidiu Petre's career, Cosmin Olăroiu, left Poli and signed a contract with Steaua București. Petre made public his intentions to cancel his contract with Poli in order to play for the new team of his favourite coach. After many negotiations Petre got his transfer to Steaua in the beginning of the 2006–07 season.

=== Steaua București (2006–10) ===
In August 2006, however, Petre signed a five-year contract with Steaua București for a fee of €1 million, joining his former manager Cosmin Olăroiu once again. He made his debut for Steaua on 9 September 2006 in the victory against FC Argeş with 1–0. Petre scored his first goal for Steaua against his former team, Poli Timișoara, in a 3–1 win. In the 2007–08 season, he scored two consecutive goals, one with Pandurii Targu-Jiu in a 1–0 win and the other one in the derby with CFR Cluj, which Steaua won with 3–1. After that game the championship title was still a hope for Steaua, getting behind with nine points of the leader, CFR Cluj. His first goal in the UEFA Champions League was against Sevilla, even though he scored Steaua lost the match with 2–1. In August 2008, Italian club Torino showed interest to the defensive midfielder. Steaua owner, Gigi Becali, lowered the possible transfer fee down to €7.8 million. On 21 October 2008, he scored his second Champions League goal against Lyon.

=== Al-Nassr (2010–2011) ===
On 18 June 2010, Petre signed a one-year renewable contract with Al-Nassr of Saudi Arabia for $1.5 million. In his first match for Al-Nassr, Petre scored the winning goal in a 1–0 win over Najran.

=== Modena (2011–2012) ===
After the contract with Al-Nassr ended, Petre took an offer to join Italian Serie B side Modena. It was confirmed that he would sign a one-year contract on 26 July 2011.

== International career ==
Petre earned 23 caps for Romania and scored one goal. He made his national debut on 17 April 2002 in a 2–1 win over Poland.

== Personal life ==
He is not related to Ciprian Petre. But he is married with Oana Nistor and they have Eva as a daughter.

== Career statistics ==
Romania
Year	Apps	Goals
2002	3	0
2003	1	0
2004	4	0
2005	3	1
2006	4	0
2007	6	0
2008	2	0
2009	1	0
Total	24	1

#	Date	Venue	Opponent	Score	Result	Competition
1.	8 June 2005	Stadionul Farul, Constanţa, Romania	Armenia	1–0	3–0	FIFA World Cup 2006 Qualifying

== Honours ==
ACS Poli Timișoara

- Liga II: 2014–15
