= Bogdan Straton =

Romanian footballer

Personal information
- Date of birth: 23 August 1983 (age 43)
- Place of birth: Iaşi, Romania
- Height: 1.87 m (6 ft 1 1/2 in)
- Positions: Centre-back; defensive midfielder

Senior career*
Years	Team	Apps	(Gls)
2003	Minaur Zlatna		
2004	Unirea Alba Iulia		
2004	Pașcani		
2005–2007	Botoșani	65	(0)
2008–2010	Politehnica Iaşi	31	(1)
2008	→ Petrolul Ploiești (loan)		
2010	Botoșani	7	(0)
2011	Widzew Łódź	0	(0)
2011–2013	Politehnica Iași	41	(4)
2013–2014	FC Clinceni	19	(1)
2014–2015	Farul Constanța	12	(1)
2015–2021	Bradul Borca	233	(12)
- * Club domestic league appearances and goals as of 15 February 2016

Bogdan Straton (born 23 August 1983) is a Romanian professional footballer who plays as a defensive midfielder.

== Club career ==
=== Politehnica Iaşi ===
In July 2011, Straton joined Politehnica Iași on a two-year deal. At the end of the season, CSMS finished second in table and gained promotion to Liga I, in part due to Straton's performances.
