= Valentin Coca =

Romanian footballer

Personal information
- Full name: Valentin Ilie Coca
- Date of birth: 9 February 1987 (age 39)
- Place of birth: Timișoara, Romania
- Height: 1.87 m (6 ft 2 in)
- Position: Goalkeeper

Youth career
- 2004–2005: Calor Timișoara

Senior career*
| Years | Team | Apps | (Gls) |
| 2005–2011 | Argeș Pitești | 9 | (0) |
| 2006–2007 | → Severnav Turnu-Severin (loan) | 17 | (0) |
| 2011–2012 | Mioveni | 6 | (0) |
| 2012–2014 | Poli Timișoara | 4 | (0) |
| 2014–2015 | Caransebeș | 10 | (0) |
| 2016–2019 | Cosmos Aystetten | 57 | (0) |
| Total | | 103 | (0) |
- * Club domestic league appearances and goals as of 12:20, 15 June 2021 (UTC)

Valentin Ilie Coca (born 9 February 1987) is a Romanian former footballer who played as a goalkeeper for teams such as FC Argeș Pitești, CS Mioveni, FC Caransebeș or Cosmos Aystetten, among others.
