= Florin Hidișan =

Romanian footballer (1982–2022)

Personal information
- Date of birth: 24 June 1982
- Place of birth: Râmnicu Vâlcea, Romania
- Date of death: 11 September 2022 (aged 40)
- Place of death: Cluj-Napoca, Romania
- Height: 1.72 m (5 ft 8 in)
- Position: Midfielder

Senior career*
Years	Team	Apps	(Gls)
2001–2002	IS Câmpia Turzii	21	(1)
2002–2003	Internațional Curtea de Argeș	12	(0)
2003–2004	Argeș Pitești	4	(0)
2004–2006	Otopeni	39	(5)
2006	Brașov	10	(1)
2006–2008	UTA Arad	56	(4)
2009–2011	Pandurii Târgu Jiu	38	(2)
2011–2012	UTA Arad	27	(1)
2013	Universitatea Cluj	10	(1)
2014	Arieșul Turda		
2016–2017	Arieșul Apuseni		
2017–2018	Performanța Ighiu		
2018–2019	CS Ocna Mureș		
Total		217	(15)
- * Club domestic league appearances and goals as of 11 September 2022

Florin Hidișan (24 June 1982 – 11 September 2022) was a Romanian footballer who played as a midfielder. He spent his entire career playing in Romania, having a total of 107 Liga I appearances with 7 goals scored and 110 Liga II appearances with 8 goals scored.

Hidișan died from stomach cancer in Cluj-Napoca, on 11 September, at the age of 40.
