= Miguel Fallardo =

Portuguese footballer

Personal information
- Full name: Miguel Luis Fallardo
- Date of birth: 24 June 1986 (age 40)
- Place of birth: Portugal
- Height: 1.75 m (5 ft 9 in)
- Position: Midfielder

Senior career*
Years	Team	Apps	(Gls)
2008	FC Gloria Buzău	6	(1)
- * Club domestic league appearances and goals as of October 24, 2008

Miguel Fallardo (born 24 June 1986, Portugal) is a Portuguese footballer.
