= Lucian Răduță =

Romanian footballer

Lucian Răduţă
Personal information
- Full name: Lucian Dorin Răduţă
- Date of birth: 16 August 1988 (age 38)
- Place of birth: Bucharest, Romania
- Height: 1.89 m (6 ft 2 in)
- Position: Striker

Youth career
- 1996–2004: CȘS Pajura
- 2004–2006: Rapid București

Senior career*
Years	Team	Apps	(Gls)
2007–2011	Rapid București	40	(6)
2011	→ FCM Târgu Mureş (loan)	10	(1)
2012	Mioveni	8	(0)
2014	Berceni	5	(0)
Total		63	(7)

International career
2009–2010	Romania U21	6	(1)
- * Club domestic league appearances and goals as of 8 April 2019

Lucian Dorin Răduţă (born 16 August 1988) is a Romanian former professional football player who made his debut for the Rapid București first team in the 2006–07 season, playing only one league game that season.
