= Claudiu Dumitrescu =

Romanian footballer (born 1979)

Personal information
- Full name: Claudiu Gabriel Dumitrescu
- Date of birth: 7 October 1979 (age 47)
- Place of birth: Câmpina, Romania
- Height: 1.72 m (5 ft 8 in)
- Position: Full back

Youth career
- Poiana Câmpina

Senior career*
Years	Team	Apps	(Gls)
2001–2006	FCM Câmpina	49	(3)
2006–2009	Otopeni	84	(6)
2009	Petrolul Ploiești	6	(0)
2010–2011	Otopeni	36	(0)
2011	Concordia Chiajna	6	(0)
2012–2013	Otopeni	27	(2)
2013–2014	CSM Câmpina	?	(?)
2014–2016	Gloria Buzău	55	(5)
Total		263	(16)
- * Club domestic league appearances and goals as of 14 March 2018

Claudiu Gabriel Dumitrescu (born 7 October 1979) is a Romanian former footballer who played as a full back. Dumitrescu grew up at Poiana Câmpina for which he also made his Liga II and Liga III debuts. In career he played mostly for Otopeni (147 matches; 8 goals), but spent also short periods at Petrolul Ploiești and Concordia Chiajna. In the last two seasons of his career, Dumitrescu played in 55 matches and scored 5 goals for FC Gloria Buzău. He made the Liga I debut also for Otopeni, in a 0–4 defeat against CFR Cluj on 20 September 2008.
