= António Semedo =

Portuguese footballer (born 1979)

Personal information
- Full name: António Paulo Sanches Semedo
- Date of birth: 1 June 1979 (age 47)
- Place of birth: Lisbon, Portugal
- Height: 1.70 m (5 ft 7 in)
- Position: Winger

Youth career
- –1998: Casa Pia

Senior career*
| Years | Team | Apps | (Gls) |
| 1998–2000 | Casa Pia | | |
| 2000–2006 | Estrela Amadora | 187 | (25) |
| 2006–2008 | CFR Cluj | 68 | (13) |
| 2008–2009 | Steaua București | 24 | (3) |
| 2009 | Steaua II București | 0 | (0) |
| 2009–2010 | Unirea Urziceni | 40 | (8) |
| 2011 | Alki Larnaca | 15 | (2) |
| 2011–2012 | Khazar Lankaran | 21 | (3) |
| Total | | 355 | (54) |

International career
| 2000–2002 | Portugal U21 | 16 | (1) |
- * Club domestic league appearances and goals

António Paulo Sanches Semedo (born 1 June 1979) is a Portuguese former professional footballer who played as a winger.

He was nicknamed "The Black Panther".

After starting out at Casa Pia, Semedo amassed Primeira Liga totals of 97 games and 11 goals over the course of three seasons with Estrela Amadora, where he played six years overall. He also competed professionally for CFR Cluj, Steaua București and Unirea Urziceni in Romania, Alki Larnaca in Cyprus, and Khazar Lankaran in Azerbaijan.

Internationally, Semedo earned 16 caps for Portugal at under-21 level between 2000 and 2002.

== Club career ==
=== Casa Pia and Estrela Amadora ===
Semedo was born on 1 June 1979 in Lisbon, Portugal and began playing junior-level football in 1996 at Casa Pia. Two years later, he started to play for the club's senior side in the fourth league, helping them earn promotion to the third league in the 1999–2000 season.

In 2000, Semedo joined Estrela Amadora, making his Primeira Liga debut on 20 August when coach Quinito sent him in the 59th minute to replace Jorge Cadete in a 2–0 away loss to Leiria. He scored his first goal in the league on 14 October in a 4–0 home win over Campomaiorense. Subsequently, he netted another three goals in three draws against Braga, Paços Ferreira and Beira-Mar, but the team was relegated to the second league at the end of the season. Semedo stayed with the club in the second league, helping it gain promotion back to the first league after a two-season absence. In the 2003–04 season he appeared regularly for the team, scoring one goal in a 2–1 away loss to Braga, as the team suffered another relegation. After one year in the second league, he earned another promotion with Estrela back to the first league. In the following season, Semedo had his last and most prolific season in the Primeira Liga. He scored a brace in a 2–0 win over Belenenses and another three goals in three 1–0 wins over Penafiel, Vitória de Guimarães and Vitória Setúbal, one goal in a 2–0 victory against Vitória de Guimarães, as the team finished in 9th place. Semedo has a total of 97 matches with 11 goals in the competition.

=== CFR Cluj ===
In 2006, Semedo joined Romania's CFR Cluj, together with compatriots Ricardo Cadú, Manuel José and Pedro Oliveira. He made his Liga I debut on 30 July 2006 when player-coach Dorinel Munteanu sent him in the 63rd minute to replace Romeo Surdu in a 3–1 away victory over Oțelul Galați. On 21 October, he scored his first goal in the league in a 2–0 home win over Argeș Pitești. Afterwards, he scored in victories against Oțelul Galați, Pandurii Târgu Jiu, Jiul Petroșani, a brace in a 5–0 win over UTA Arad and the victory goal in a 3–2 win over Rapid București. Thus, he managed a personal record of seven goals by the end of the season that helped the team finish for the first time in third place.

Semedo started the following season by opening the score in a 2–2 draw against Politehnica Timișoara. By the end of the season he scored five more goals, one each against Politehnica Iași, UTA Arad, Universitatea Craiova and a double against Dinamo București, with all the games ending in victories. Semedo ended his second season with CFR by winning The Double, which constituted the club's first trophies, contributing with six goals in the 28 league matches under coach Ioan Andone. He also played the entire 2008 Cupa României final, scoring the decisive goal in the 2–1 win over Unirea Urziceni by beating goalkeeper Bogdan Stelea with his second attempt after the first was saved. In the same season he made his debut in a European club competition, playing in both legs of the 3–1 loss on aggregate to Anorthosis in the UEFA Cup second qualifying round.

=== Steaua București ===
In 2008, Semedo was transferred by Steaua București from CFR for €1.2 million, and was presented at a press conference alongside George Ogăraru, Ricardo Pedriel and Andrei Ionescu. On 13 September, Semedo scored from a corner kick on his debut, as coach Marius Lăcătuș used him as a starter in Steaua's 4–1 win against Farul Constanța. The following week, he netted a brace in the 4–0 victory over Gaz Metan Mediaș. He also appeared in six games in the 2008–09 Champions League group stage, playing against Bayern Munich, Lyon and Fiorentina, as the team earned only one point after a 0–0 draw against the latter.

For the 2009–10 season, Semedo was initially demoted to Steaua's B-squad alongside several other teammates but eventually in August 2009 he became free of contract.

=== Unirea Urziceni ===
Shortly after he left Steaua, Semedo signed a four-year contract with Unirea Urziceni where he was wanted by coach Dan Petrescu. On 30 November 2009 he scored his first league goal for his new team in a 2–0 home win over Gloria Bistrița. Subsequently, he scored two more goals in the following two rounds in victories against Ceahlăul Piatra Neamț and Politehnica Iași. In the second half of the season, he scored two goals in a 4–4 draw against Dinamo București and a 4–1 away win over "U" Craiova. He also made four appearances in the 2009–10 Champions League group stage, playing against Sevilla, Rangers and VfB Stuttgart, scoring a goal in a 3–1 loss to the latter, as the team earned eight points and finished third. Thus they qualified to the round of 32 of the Europa League where he played in the second leg of the 4–1 aggregate loss to Liverpool. In the following season, Semedo scored his last three goals in Liga I, which included the sole goal in a victory against his former team, Steaua, one in a loss to Victoria Brănești and another in a win against Sportul Studențesc București. He has a total of 132 games with 24 goals in the Romanian league and 14 appearances with one goal in European competitions.

=== Alki Larnaca and Khazar Lankaran ===
In late December 2010, Semedo signed with Alki Larnaca. He made his Cypriot First Division debut on 15 January 2011 under coach Itzhak Shum in a 3–2 loss to Apollon Limassol. He scored two goals in the league, the first one was the winning goal in a 2–1 victory over APOEL, while the second was in a 3–2 loss to Ethnikos Achna.

In the summer of 2011, Semedo penned a one-year contract with Khazar Lankaran where he was wanted by Romanian coach Mircea Rednic. He made his Azerbaijan Premier League debut on 27 August in a 1–1 draw against Ravan Baku. Subsequently, he scored three goals in the league, with the first two in victories over Gabala and Simurq, and the last one in a draw against Simurq.

== International career ==
Semedo played 16 games for Portugal's under-21 national team, scoring his only goal on his debut, which occurred on 6 October 2000 in a 3–1 win over Ireland's under-21 national team during the successful 2002 European Under-21 Championship qualifiers. He was selected by coach Agostinho Oliveira to be part of the final tournament squad, playing in a loss to Switzerland U21 and a victory over England U21, as his side failed to progress from their group.

== Personal life ==
Upon retiring from football, Semedo relocated to England with his wife and children.

In a 2011 interview, Semedo said that the team he enjoyed playing the most was CFR Cluj:"At CFR Cluj, I was an idol, I had the impression that I was Cristiano Ronaldo. I would walk the streets of the city and see people with t-shirts with my face on them. In Cluj, we ended the dictatorship of the big teams from Bucharest".

In an interview for Orange Sport from 2022, he talked about his experiences with racism in football and how he views it:"To me it seemed perfectly normal to hear racist insults when I was playing. But that didn't make those people racist. They simply believed and hoped that they could destabilize me during the match in favor of their favorite team. That's it. That's how I see it and I saw the situation then as well. Off the pitch, no one treated me and my family badly because I was of a different color. On the contrary."

== Honours ==
Casa Pia

- Terceira Divisão: 1999–2000

CFR Cluj

- Liga I: 2007–08
- Cupa României: 2007–08

Unirea Urziceni

- Supercupa României runner-up: 2010
