= Elías Bazzi =

Argentine footballer (born 1981)

Personal information
- Full name: Elías Iván Bazzi
- Date of birth: 23 May 1981 (age 45)
- Place of birth: Córdoba, Argentina
- Height: 1.86 m (6 ft 1 in)
- Position: Defender

Youth career
- Talleres de Cordoba
- 1996–2000: Boca Juniors

Senior career*
Years	Team	Apps	(Gls)
2000–2002	Boca Juniors	2	(0)
2002–2004	Sportivo Italiano	7	(0)
2004–2005	Godoy Cruz	5	(0)
2005–2006	Național București	17	(2)
2006–2010	Argeș Pitești	101	(7)
2010–2011	Dinamo București	4	(0)
2011–2012	Universitatea Cluj	18	(0)
2012	Argeș Pitești	11	(0)
2012–2014	Talleres de Cordoba	72	(0)
2015–2016	Gimnasia y Tiro	41	(3)
Total		278	(12)
- * Club domestic league appearances and goals

Elías Iván Bazzi (born 23 May 1981) is an Argentine former professional footballer who played as a defender.

== Career ==
=== Early career ===
Bazzi was born on 23 May 1981 in Córdoba, Argentina and began playing junior-level football at local club Talleres de Cordoba. At age 15, he moved to the youth center of Boca Juniors. Bazzi made his Argentine Primera División debut on 11 June 2000 by playing the entire match under coach Carlos Bianchi in Boca's 3–2 home win over Colón. In 2003, he joined third-league side Sportivo Italiano, moving one year later to second-tier club Godoy Cruz.

=== Career in Romania ===
In 2005, Bazzi joined Romanian side Național București, making his Divizia A debut on 11 March under coach Roberto Landi in a 1–1 away draw against FC Brașov. He scored his first goal in the competition on 24 April in a 5–1 victory against Dinamo București. In the middle of the 2005–06 season, he went to play for Argeș Pitești. The team suffered relegation at the end of the 2006–07 season, but Bazzi stayed with the club, scoring three goals to help it gain promotion back to the first league after one year. He scored three goals in the 2008–09 season: the first was the equalizer in a 2–2 draw against Steaua București, and the other two came in a 2–1 win over Gloria Bistrița. After the latter game, coach Ionuț Badea said: "I believe Bazzi should be congratulated by the entire team for today's performance." However, in the summer of 2009, Argeș was relegated by the Romanian Football Federation for referee corruption. Bazzi spent one more year with Argeș in the second league before coming back to first league football by joining Dinamo. He made only four league appearances during the first half of the 2010–11 season and then went to play for Universitatea Cluj. There, he made his last appearance in the Romanian top league on 18 December 2011 in a 2–2 draw against CS Mioveni, totaling 97 matches with five goals in the competition. In February 2012, Bazzi returned to Argeș in the second league, where he stayed until July.

=== Late career ===
In 2012, Bazzi came back to Argentina to play for Talleres de Cordoba, helping the club gain promotion from the third league to the second at the end of his first season. However, he could not avoid the team's relegation back to the third league at the end of the 2013–14 season. From 2015 to 2016, Bazzi played in the third tier for Gimnasia y Tiro, retiring afterwards.

== Honours ==
Argeș Pitești

- Liga II: 2007–08

Talleres de Cordoba

- Torneo Federal A: 2012–13
