= Robert Neagoe =

Romanian footballer

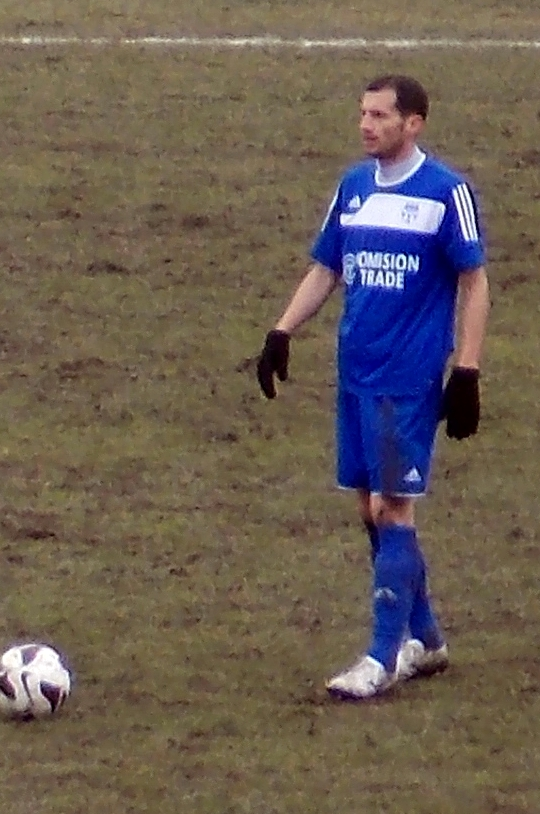
- Neagoe in 2014

Personal information
- Full name: Robert Gabriel Neagoe
- Date of birth: 28 May 1982 (age 44)
- Place of birth: Piteşti, Romania
- Height: 1.80 m (5 ft 11 in)
- Position: Midfielder

Senior career*
| Years | Team | Apps | (Gls) |
| 2001–2002 | Argeş Piteşti | 1 | (1) |
| 2002–2003 | Internaţional Curtea de Argeş | 15 | (1) |
| 2003–2005 | Dacia Mioveni | 21 | (9) |
| 2005 | Argeş Piteşti | 10 | (0) |
| 2005–2007 | Royal Antwerp | 13 | (1) |
| 2007–2008 | Dacia Mioveni | 30 | (4) |
| 2008–2009 | Steaua București | 0 | (0) |
| 2008–2009 | Steaua II București | 8 | (1) |
| 2008 | → Gloria Bistriţa (loan) | 2 | (0) |
| 2009–2010 | ASIL Lysi | | |
| 2010–2011 | CSMS Iaşi | 5 | (0) |
| 2011–2013 | Farul Constanţa | 17 | (3) |
| 2013–2014 | CF Brăila | 35 | (3) |
| 2014–2015 | Farul Constanţa | 15 | (2) |
| 2015 | SCM Pitești | | |
| 2017 | Farul Constanța | | |

International career
| 2006 | Romania U21 | 1 | (0) |
- * Club domestic league appearances and goals

Robert Gabriel Neagoe (born 28 May 1982) is a Romanian former professional footballer who played as a midfielder.
