= Youssouf Kamara =

Ivorian footballer (born 1981)

Personal information
- Full name: Youssouf Vassanogo Kamara
- Date of birth: August 10, 1981 (age 45)
- Place of birth: Dabou, Ivory Coast
- Height: 1.81 m (5 ft 11 in)
- Position: Striker

Youth career
- 1997–1998: Académie de Sol Beni

Senior career*
Years	Team	Apps	(Gls)
1998–1999	ASEC Mimosas		
1999–2001	→ AC Bellinzona (loan)	4	(0)
2001–2002	Napoli	0	(0)
2002	→ S.S. Cavese (loan)	7	(0)
2002–2003	→ Viribus Unitis (loan)	10	(0)
2003–2005	Viribus Unitis	15	(6)
2005–2006	ASD Gaeta	23	(11)
2006–2007	U.S. Venafro	33	(18)
2007–2008	ASD Sanita	12	(5)
2008–2009	FC Argeş Piteşti	21	(11)
2009–2010	Pandurii Târgu Jiu	11	(0)
2010–2011	CSMS Iaşi	15	(4)
2012–2013	A.S.C. Cicciano	0	(0)
2013–2014	Nerostellati Frattese	0	(0)

International career
1997	Ivory Coast U20	3	(0)
- * Club domestic league appearances and goals

Youssouf Vassanogo Kamara (born 10 August 1981) is an Ivorian footballer. He is currently a footballer of Nerostellati Frattese (a team of a small town near Naples)
