= Monel Cârstoiu =

Romanian footballer

Personal information
- Full name: Monel Tiberiu Cârstoiu
- Date of birth: 10 April 1989 (age 37)
- Place of birth: Pitești, Romania
- Height: 1.83 m (6 ft 0 in)
- Position: Midfielder

Team information
- Current team: Deva
- Number: 10

Senior career*
Years	Team	Apps	(Gls)
2006–2013	Argeș Pitești	80	(0)
2013–2014	Râmnicu Vâlcea	23	(0)
2014–2015	Farul Constanța	15	(0)
2015	Caransebeș	13	(0)
2016	Sighetu Marmației		
2016	Național Sebiș	12	(0)
2017	Atletic Bradu	6	(0)
2017–2018	SV Bad Goisern	22	(4)
2018	Atletic Bradu	5	(0)
2019	Gilortul Târgu Cărbunești	13	(0)
2020	Știința Miroslava	1	(1)
2020–	Deva	2	(0)
- * Club domestic league appearances and goals as of 30 April 2021

Monel Tiberiu Cârstoiu (born 10 April 1989) is a Romanian footballer who plays as a midfielder for CSM Deva. He made his debut in Liga I on 26 July 2008, the opening day of the 2008–09 season, in a 1–1 draw at home to FC Timișoara.

== Honours ==
Gilortul Târgu Cărbunești

- Liga IV – Gorj County: 2018–19
