= Alin Lițu =

Romanian footballer

Alin Liţu
Personal information
- Full name: Alin Constantin Liţu
- Date of birth: 22 October 1986 (age 40)
- Place of birth: Craiova, Romania
- Height: 1.87 m (6 ft 1 1/2 in)
- Position: Forward

Youth career
- 2002–2004: Steaua București

Senior career*
| Years | Team | Apps | (Gls) |
| 2004–2012 | Steaua București | 12 | (0) |
| 2005–2011 | Steaua II București | | |
| 2006–2007 | → Jiul Petroşani (loan) | 10 | (0) |
| 2007–2008 | → Gloria Buzău (loan) | 37 | (4) |
| 2009–2010 | → ASIL Lysi (loan) | 0 | (0) |
| 2010–2012 | → Gaz Metan Mediaş (loan) | 33 | (7) |
| 2014 | Universitatea Craiova | | |

International career
| 2007–2009 | Romania U21 | 3 | (0) |
- * Club domestic league appearances and goals as of 27 February 2010

Alin Liţu (born 22 October 1986 in Craiova, Romania) is a retired football striker that was under contract with Steaua București.

== Career ==
=== Debut ===
Coming out through the youth ranks of Steaua București, Alin Liţu made his debut under the coaching of Walter Zenga on 8 May 2005, during the Oţelul – Steaua 1-0 match. Used intermittently during the last part of that season, Liţu never really proved his point and ended up playing for the Steaua II during the following season.

==== Jiul spell ====
During the 2006–2007 season he was loaned to CS Jiul Petroşani, where he played a total of 10 matches, but didn't score a single goal.

==== Gloria Buzău spell ====
For the 2007–2008 season, Steaua București loaned him to newly promoted Gloria Buzău, where he would make a name for himself and earn first team experience. The season was disappointing for him, in terms of goalscoring – only four goals in 37 appearances. His loan was extended for another 6 months (the first half of the 2008–2009 season) before returning to Steaua București.

=== Steaua return ===
After an impressive winter training period, where he scored many goals and seemed to be one of the frontrunners for occupying a first team spot, Liţu spent most of the following period playing for the Steaua II or coming as a sub in few matches.

In 2009–10, Liţu was demoted to the B squad.

In January 2010 Steaua II București loaned Liţu to Gaz Metan Mediaş until June 2012.

== Honours ==
Steaua București

- Romanian Championship League: 2004–05
