= Florian Dan Lăcustă =

Romanian footballer

Dan Lăcustă
Personal information
- Full name: Florian Dan Lăcustă
- Date of birth: 22 March 1977 (age 49)
- Place of birth: Piteşti, Romania
- Height: 1.86 m (6 ft 1 in)
- Position: Defender

Senior career*
Years	Team	Apps	(Gls)
1993–1998	Argeș Pitești	74	(1)
1998–1999	Sheriff Tiraspol	20	(2)
1999–2003	Astra Ploieşti	79	(1)
2003–2005	Sheriff Tiraspol	51	(2)
2005–2006	FC Vaslui	22	(0)
2006	Sheriff Tiraspol	?	(0)
2007	Ceahlăul Piatra Neamț	?	(?)
2007–2010	Argeş Piteşti	61	(2)
Total		307	(8)

International career^{‡}
2000–2001	Romania	3	(0)
- * Club domestic league appearances and goals as of 27 June 2014 ‡ National team caps and goals as of 9 October 2008

Florian Dan Lăcustă (born 22 March 1977 in Piteşti) is a retired Romanian footballer.

== Club career ==
Lăcustă has appeared in 160 Romanian Liga I matches and 71 Moldovan National Division matches over his 16-year football career. He joined Ceahlăul Piatra Neamţ in January 2007. In September 2007, he returned to FC Argeş Piteşti, where manager Ionuţ Badea expected him to be a powerful and experienced central defender for the club.

He appeared in four qualifying matches for the 2005–06 UEFA Champions League with FC Sheriff Tiraspol.

== International career ==
Lăcustă has made three appearances for the senior Romania national football team. He made his debut in a friendly match against Algeria on 8 December 2000. He played in one qualifying match for the 2002 FIFA World Cup, a 1–1 draw against Georgia on 6 October 2001.

== Honours ==
FC Argeş Piteşti

- Liga II: 1993–94, 2007–08

FC Sheriff Tiraspol

- Divizia Naţională: 2003–04, 2004–05, 2006–07
- Moldovan Cup: 1999
- Moldovan Super Cup: 2004, 2005
