= Florin Lovin =

Romanian footballer

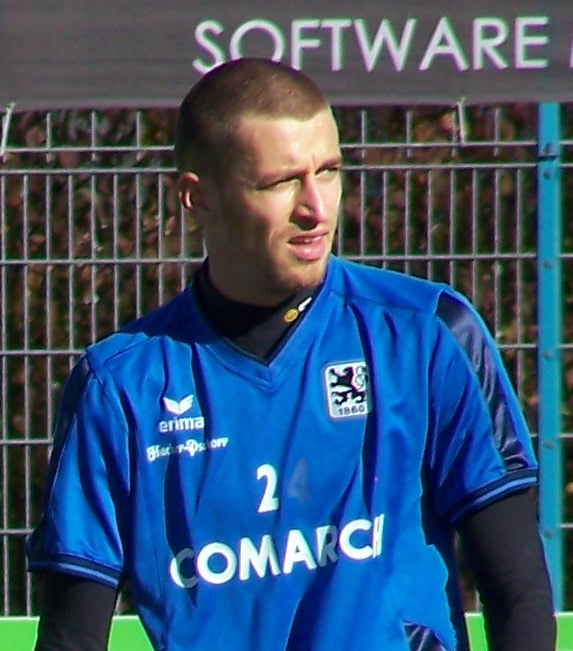
- Lovin with 1860 Munich in 2010

Personal information
- Date of birth: 11 February 1982 (age 44)
- Place of birth: Piatra Neamţ, Romania
- Height: 1.90 m (6 ft 3 in)
- Positions: Defensive midfielder; centre-back

Youth career
- –2001: FCM Bacău

Senior career*
Years	Team	Apps	(Gls)
2001–2004	FCM Bacău	50	(1)
2001–2002	→ Rafinăria Dărmănești (loan)		
2005–2009	Steaua București	103	(3)
2009	Steaua II București	2	(0)
2009–2011	1860 Munich	26	(0)
2011	Kerkyra	9	(0)
2012	Kapfenberg	15	(0)
2012–2014	Mattersburg	50	(3)
2014	Oțelul Galați	14	(1)
2014–2015	Concordia Chiajna	20	(0)
2015–2017	Astra Giurgiu	51	(0)
Total		340	(8)
- * Club domestic league appearances and goals

Florin Lovin (born 11 February 1982) is a Romanian former professional footballer who played as a defensive midfielder or a centre-back.

== Club career ==
Lovin played for FCM Bacău between 2001 and 2005, prior to joining Steaua București. He made his Divizia A debut on 25 May 2002 in the FCM Bacău 2–1 defeat at FC National.

On 7 July 2008, Steaua's coach Marius Lăcătuş sent Lovin to Steaua II București for the indiscipline during training. Steaua's board have announced that Lovin has been transfer-listed. On 8 July 2008, Gigi Becali said that he would not let Lovin go for less than €800 000. On 23 July 2008, Steaua's coach called him back to first team. In 2009–10, Lovin was demoted to the B squad again. On 20 July 2009, Lovin was transferred to 1860 Munich.

On 12 September 2009, Lovin suffered a serious injury during a clash with Greuther Fürth's Youssef Mokhtari. He suffered a ligament break, which kept him off the field for half a year. After completing 26 matches for the 1860 Munich during the 2010–11 season, his contract was terminated.

He signed a three-year contract with Greek Super League side Kerkyra in July 2011 but his contract terminated in December 2011.

== Honours ==
Steaua București

- Divizia A: 2004–05, 2005–06
- Supercupa României: 2006

Astra Giurgiu

- Liga I: 2015–16
- Cupa României runner-up: 2016–17
- Supercupa României: 2016
