= Stadionul Nicolae Dobrin =

Romanian stadium

- Trivale
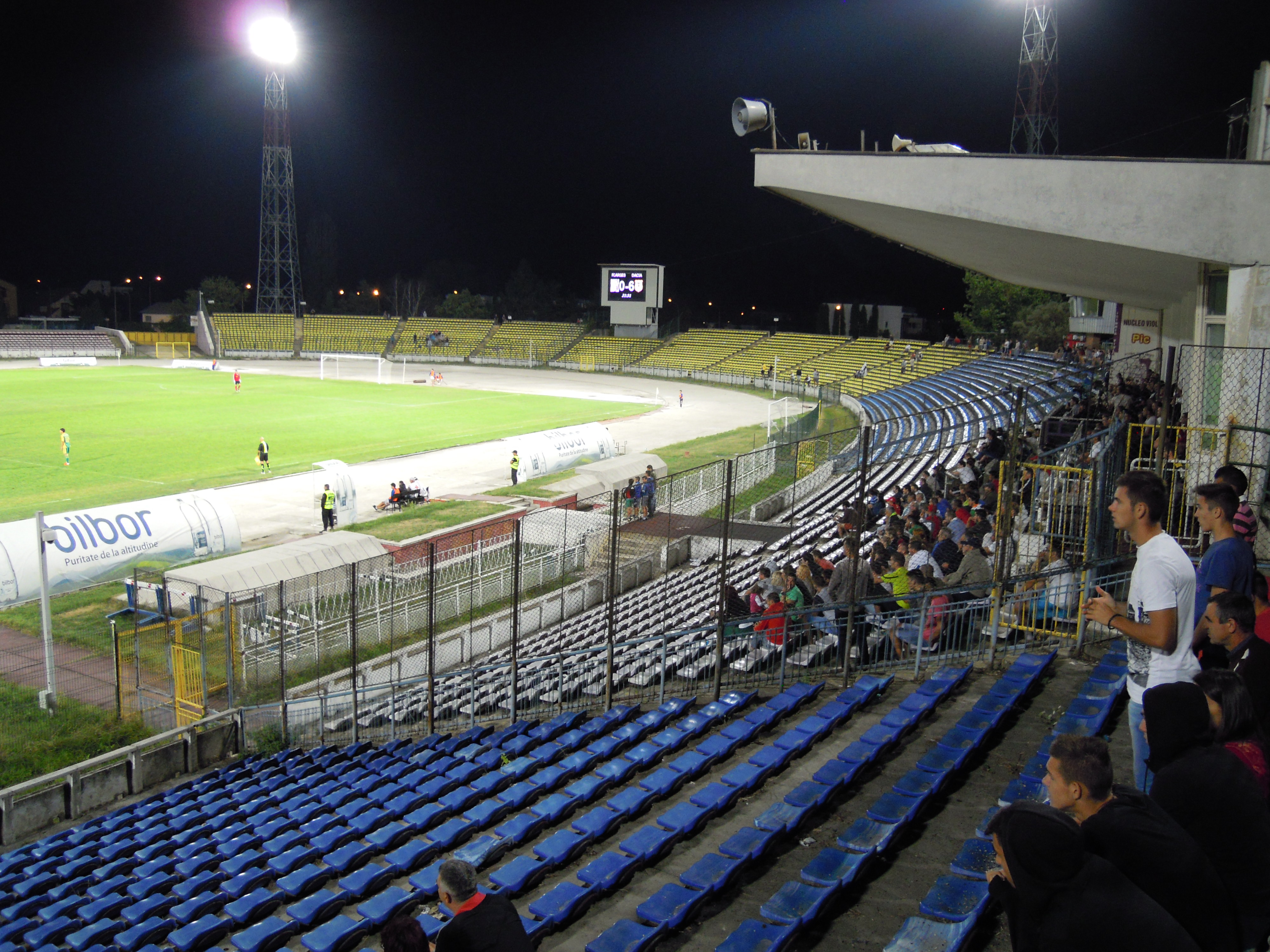
- Interactive map of Stadionul Nicolae Dobrin
- Former names: Stadionul 1 Mai; Stadionul Municipal
- Address: Str. Nicolae Dobrin
- Location: Piteşti, Romania
- Coordinates: 44°50′48″N 24°51′59″E
- Owner: Municipality of Piteşti
- Operator: Argeş Piteşti
- Capacity: 14,909 seated
- Surface: Grass

Construction
- Opened: 1964
- Renovated: 2007
- Demolished: 2023
- Rebuilt: 2026–2028

Tenants
- Argeş Piteşti (1964–2023); Internaţional Curtea de Argeş (2010); Rapid București (2011); CS Mioveni (2013–2015); Academica Argeş (2014–2015); FCSB (2015–2016) (2018–2019); CS Universitatea Craiova (2017); FC Hermannstadt (2018)

Nicolae Dobrin Stadium is a multi-purpose stadium in Piteşti, Romania, named in 2003 after football player Nicolae Dobrin (1947–2007). It was mostly used for football matches as the home ground of FC Argeş Piteşti.

== History ==
The stadium had a capacity of 15,000 people, making it the 18th largest stadium in Romania, however the largest crowd ever recorded was of 28,000 people for the 1979–80 European Champions' Cup match between FC Argeş and Nottingham Forest. It was originally named "Stadionul 1 Mai" but changed simply to "Stadionul Municipal" immediately after the 1989 Romanian Revolution. The stadium's name was changed to Nicolae Dobrin in 2002. The stadium was demolished in the summer of 2023.

Construction of the new stadium was scheduled to begin on 19 January 2026. The National Investment Company (CNI) officially notified the consortium of Construcții Erbașu S.A. and Terra Gaz Construct SRL, the stadium's contractor, of the commencement date.

== Important matches ==
- 1964 – First match: FC Argeș Pitești 2–1 Bonsucesso Rio de Janeiro
- 1966 – FC Argeș Pitești 5–1 Toulouse
- 1972 – 1/8 European Champions Cup: FC Argeș Pitești 2–1 Real Madrid
- 1978 – 1/8 UEFA Cup: FC Argeș Pitești 2–1 Valencia
- 1979 – 1/16 European Champions Cup: FC Argeș Pitești 3–0 AEK Athens
- 1979 – 1/8 European Champions Cup: FC Argeș Pitești 1–2 Nottingham Forest
- 1999 – Liga I: FC Argeș Pitești 4–0 Steaua București
- 2009 – Liga I: FC Argeș Pitești 5–2 Dinamo București

== Gallery ==
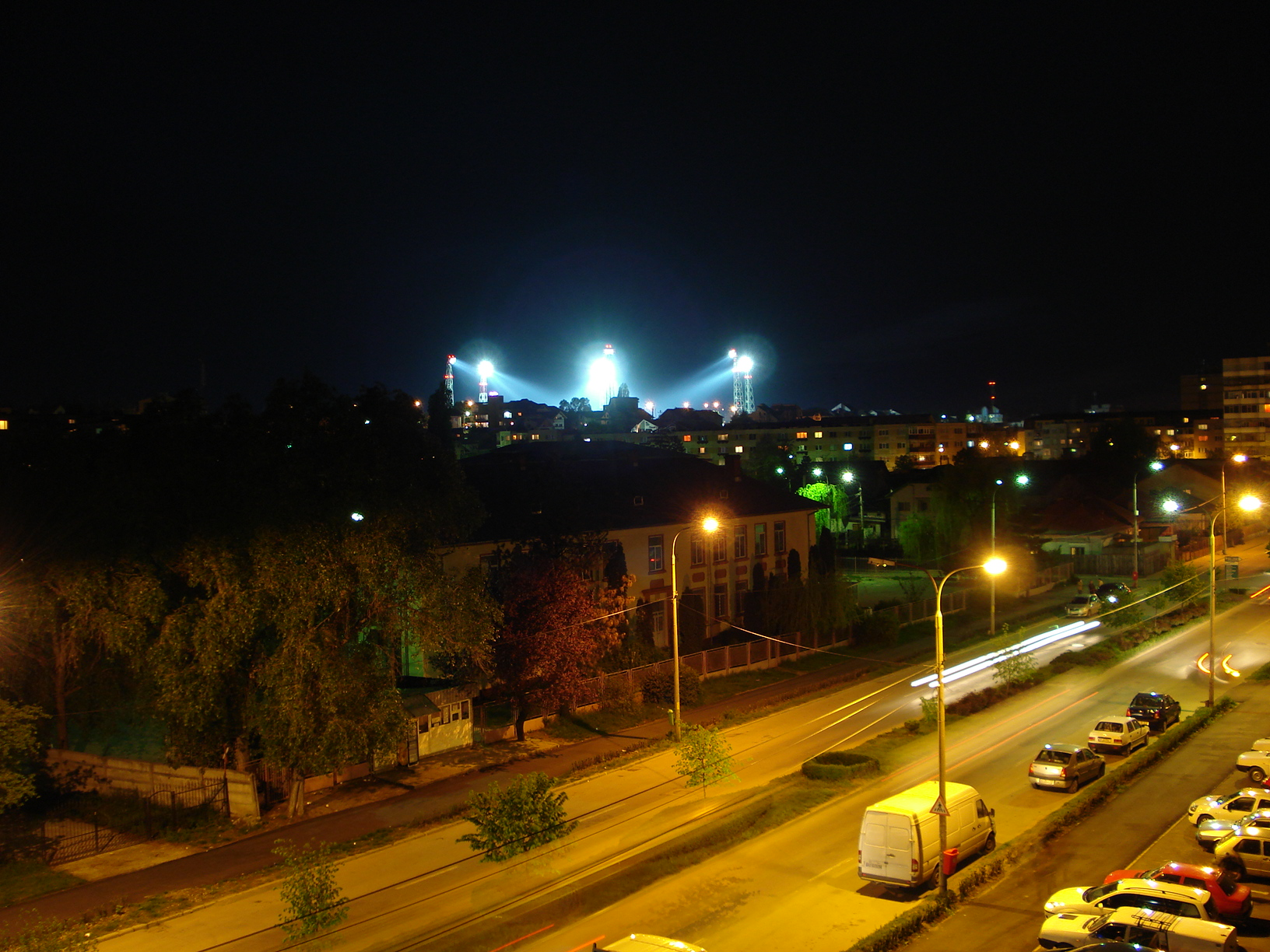
Nicolae Dobrin Stadium-floodlights on

== See also ==
- List of football stadiums in Romania
