= 2003–04 FC Dinamo București season =

FC Dinamo București
2003–04 season
- Manager: Ioan Andone
- Liga I: 1st
- Romanian Cup: Winner
- UEFA Cup: 2nd round
- Top goalscorer: Ionel Dănciulescu (21 goals)

The 2003–04 season was FC Dinamo București's 55th season in Divizia A. After building up a team again in 2003–04, Dinamo eliminated Shakhtar Donetsk in the first round of the UEFA Cup 2003–04 season. They went on to lose to Spartak Moscow in the second round.

In the Romanian League, against all odds, Dinamo won everything: the championships, the Romanian Cup, and the top goalscorer (Ionel Dănciulescu). Seen as the third favourite in the battle, after Rapid and Steaua, Dinamo had an excellent second part of the season, and two strikers, Dănciulescu and Claudiu Niculescu that scored together 37 goals. Dinamo had 14 wins at home, out of 15 games, the only defeat in front of their own fans being registered at the beginning of the season, against Rapid. Dinamo won the title with a game in hand, beating in the 29th round Apulum Alba Iulia, at home.

In the Romanian Cup final, Dinamo defeated Oţelul Galaţi at Cotroceni.

== Results ==
Divizia A
Round	Date	Opponent	Stadium	Result
1	9 August 2003	FC Argeș	A	1–2
2	17 August 2003	FC Bihor	H	1–0
3	23 August 2003	Steaua București	A	0–1
4	31 August 2003	Naţional București	H	4–1
5	13 September 2003	Oţelul Galaţi	A	0–0
6	19 September 2003	FCM Bacău	H	7–3
7	28 September 2003	U Craiova	A	1–0
8	4 October 2003	Farul Constanţa	H	3–2
9	19 October 2003	FC Brașov	A	4–3
10	26 October 2003	Rapid București	H	3–4
11	31 October 2003	Gloria Bistriţa	A	1–1
12	9 November 2003	Petrolul Ploieşti	A	1–0
13	22 November 2003	Poli Timişoara	H	4–2
14	30 November 2003	Apulum Alba Iulia	A	1–0
15	7 December 2003	Ceahlăul Piatra Neamţ	H	7–0
16	13 March 2004	FC Argeș	H	3–0
17	20 March 2004	FC Bihor	A	3–2
18	27 March 2004	Steaua București	H	2–1
19	3 April 2004	Naţional București	A	0–2
20	10 April 2004	Oţelul Galaţi	H	2–0
21	14 April 2004	FCM Bacău	A	0–0
22	17 April 2004	U Craiova	H	2–1
23	24 April 2004	Farul Constanţa	A	2–1
24	1 May 2004	FC Brașov	H	1–0
25	9 May 2004	Rapid București	A	3–2
26	12 May 2004	Gloria Bistriţa	H	3–0
27	15 May 2004	Petrolul Ploieşti	H	5–0
28	22 May 2004	Poli Timişoara	A	2–1
29	28 May 2004	Apulum Alba Iulia	H	5–1
30	3 June 2004	Ceahlăul Piatra Neamţ	A	0–0

Divizia A 2003–04 Winners
Dinamo București
17th Title

Cupa României
Round	Date	Opponent	Stadium	Result
Last 32	1 October 2003	Inter Gaz București	București	5–2
Last 16	22 October 2003	CS Otopeni	București	5–1
QF-1st leg	3 December 2003	Petrolul Ploieşti	București	7–0
QF-2nd leg	17 March 2004	Petrolul Ploieşti	Ploiești	2–1
SF-1st leg	7 April 2004	FC Argeş	Piteşti	0–1
SF-2nd leg	21 April 2004	FC Argeş	București	2–0
Final	6 June 2004	Oţelul Galaţi	București	2–0

Cupa României 2003–04 Winners
Dinamo București
11th Title

== UEFA Cup ==
Qualifying round

14 August 2003
20:00

Dinamo București	5–2	(Latvia) Liepājas Metalurgs
Dănciulescu 17', 88'; Fl.Petre 30', 73'; Bărcăuan 78'		Dobrekovs 42' (pen.); Šafranko 58'

Stadionul Național, Bucharest
Attendance: 7,000
Referee: Aleh Cikun (Belarus)

28 August 2003
18:00

Liepājas Metalurgs (Latvia)	1–1	Dinamo București
Grebis 45'		Zicu 23'

Daugava Stadium, Liepāja
Attendance: 1,000
Referee: Emil Laursen (Denmark)

First round

24 September 2003
20:00

Dinamo București	2–0	(Ukraine) Shakhtar Donetsk
Niculescu 86'; Zicu 87'

Stadionul Dinamo, Bucharest
Attendance: 12,000
Referee: Bernhard Brugger (Austria)

15 October 2003
19:00

Shakhtar Donetsk (Ukraine)	2–3	Dinamo București
Aghahowa 18', 45'		Niculescu 29'; Marica 75'; Dănciulescu 87'

Centralny, Donetsk
Attendance: 36,000
Referee: Tomasz Mikulski (Poland)

Second round

6 November 2003
18:00

Spartak Moscow (Russia)	4–0	Dinamo București
Pjanović 21', 62'; Kalinchenko 58'; Pavlenko 73'

Lokomotiv Stadium, Moscow
Attendance: 15,000
Referee: Dick Van Egmond (Netherlands)

27 November 2003
20:00

Dinamo București	3–1	(Russia) Spartak Moscow
Dănciulescu 29', 73' (pen.); Iordache 59'		Parfenov 85' (pen.)

Stadionul Dinamo, Bucharest
Attendance: 10,000
Referee: Costas Kapitanis (Cyprus)

== Squad ==
Goalkeepers: Grégory Delwarte (Belgium) (10 / 0); Uladzimir Hayew (Belarus) (2 / 0); Cristian Munteanu (9 / 0); Ștefan Preda (11 / 0).
Defenders: Angelo Alistar (11 / 0); Cosmin Bărcăuan (27 / 4); Mugur Bolohan (1 / 0); Ovidiu Burcă (22 / 0); Adrian Iordache (25 / 2); Xavier Méride (France) (6 / 0); Samuel Okunowo (Nigeria) (2 / 0); Szabolcs Perenyi (15 / 0); Flavius Stoican (8 / 1); Dorin Semeghin (28 / 1).
Midfielders: Dan Alexa (23 / 1); Ionuț Badea (16 / 0); Cristian Cigan (1 / 0); Cristian Ciubotariu (6 / 0); Alexandru Dragomir (1 / 0); Ștefan Grigorie (24 / 8); Sorin Iodi (1 / 0); Vlad Munteanu (18 / 2); Leonard Naidin (8 / 0); Florentin Petre (24 / 4); Iulian Tameș (26 / 1); Ianis Zicu (13 / 6).
Forwards: Ionel Dănciulescu (29 / 21); Claudiu Drăgan (8 / 0); Ciprian Marica (10 / 3); Claudiu Niculescu (28 / 16).
(league appearances and goals listed in brackets)

Manager: Ioan Andone.

== Transfers ==
New players: Gaev (FC Gomel), Alistar (Ceahlăul), Naidin (FC Oradea), Cigan (FC Oradea)

Left team: Cr.Munteanu (FC Național), Okunowo and Meride (contracts cancelled), Gregory Delwarte (Belgium), Bolohan (Universitatea Craiova), Iodi (Gloria Bistrița), Zicu (AC Parma), Marica (Shakhtar Donetsk)
