= 2002–03 FC Dinamo București season =

FC Dinamo București
2002–03 season
- Manager: Cornel Dinu; Ion Moldovan (rounds 1-3); Florin Marin (rounds 4-7); Cornel Dinu (rounds 8-18); Ioan Andone
- Liga I: 6th
- Romanian Cup: Winner
- UEFA Champions League: 2nd qual. round
- Top goalscorer: Ionel Dănciulescu (16 goals)

The 2002–03 season was FC Dinamo București's 54th season in Divizia A. In this season, Dinamo was affected again by the big number of players who left the team, which became a tradition for the bosses of the club to sell players after winning a title. Thus, Dinamo was again facing another reconstruction. They started the season badly, losing the two games in the UEFA Champions League qualifying phase, and leaving early the European competitions. Cornel Dinu was sacked after this two losses. In Divizia A Dinamo had hard times, changing a lot of managers and losing seven consecutive games. The team finished the season on the sixth position. A momentum of the season came in November, in the Romanian Cup, last 16, where Dinamo met the biggest rival Steaua. Dinamo won 3-0 the game played at the Cotroceni stadium. After Ioan Andone came to the team, Dinamo played a spectacular semifinal with Astra Ploieşti. They lost the first game, 2–1 in Ploieşti in the middle of the crisis, but then the team beat Astra in Bucharest 3-1 after extra time. They then went on to win the Romanian Cup, after beating FC Naţional in the final 1–0 on a goal scored by Iulian Tameş.

== Results ==
Divizia A
Round	Date	Opponent	Stadium	Result
1	17 August 2002	Ceahlăul	H	5–0
2	22 August 2002	Astra	A	2–4
3	31 August 2002	FCM Bacău	H	1–1
4	15 September 2002	Steaua București	A	1–1
5	21 September 2002	FC Argeș	H	3–0
6	28 September 2002	Rapid București	A	1–3
7	5 October 2002	Gloria Bistriţa	H	0–2
8	20 October 2002	Naţional București	A	2–0
9	26 October 2002	UTA	H	5–0
10	3 November 2002	Farul Constanţa	A	1–0
11	10 November 2002	Sportul Studenţesc	H	3–1
12	16 November 2002	Oţelul Galaţi	A	0–2
13	24 November 2002	FC Brașov	H	1–0
14	30 November 2002	Poli Timişoara	A	3–2
15	8 December 2002	U Craiova	H	1–0
16	19 March 2003	Ceahlăul	A	2–3
17	8 March 2003	Astra	H	0–3
18	15 March 2003	FCM Bacău	A	1–3
19	23 March 2003	Steaua București	H	2–4
20	5 April 2003	FC Argeș	A	0–2
21	13 April 2003	Rapid București	H	0–2
22	16 April 2003	Gloria Bistriţa	A	0–1
23	19 April 2003	Naţional București	H	1–1
24	26 April 2003	UTA	A	0–0
25	3 May 2003	Farul Constanţa	H	2–0
26	7 May 2003	Sportul Studenţesc	A	6–5
27	10 May 2003	Oţelul Galaţi	H	1–0
28	17 May 2003	FC Brașov	A	2–2
29	24 May 2003	Poli Timişoara	H	2–1
30	28 May 2003	U Craiova	A	1–3

Cupa României
Round	Date	Opponent	Stadium	Result
Last 32	6 November 2002	UM Timişoara	Timişoara	1–0
Last 16	27 November 2002	Steaua București	București	3–0
QF-1st leg	12 March 2003	Farul Constanţa	Constanţa	1–0
QF-2nd leg	2 April 2003	Farul Constanţa	București	2–2
SF-1st leg	23 April 2003	Astra Ploieşti	Ploieşti	1–2
SF-2nd leg	14 May 2003	Astra Ploieşti	București	3–1
Final	31 May 2003	Naţional București	București	1–0

Cupa României 2002–03 Winners
Dinamo București
10th Title

== UEFA Champions League ==
Second qualifying round

31 July 2002
21:00

Club Brugge (Belgium)	3–1	Dinamo București
Lange 25'; Mendoza 44', 85'		Alexa 43'

Jan Breydel Stadium, Bruges
Attendance: 15,000
Referee: Yuri Baskarov (Russia)

7 August 2002
21:00

Dinamo București	0–1	(Belgium) Club Brugge
		Lange 19'

Stadionul Cotroceni, Bucharest
Attendance: 10,000
Referee: Leif Sundell (Sweden)

Club Brugge KV won 4–1 on aggregate

== Squad ==
Goalkeepers: Cristian Munteanu (20/0), Daniel Tudor (6/0), Ştefan Preda (7/0).

Defenders: Angelo Alistar (1/0), Ovidiu Burcă (12/0), Alexandru Marius Dragomir (3/0), Cornel Frăsineanu (17/1), Bogdan Onuț (21/1), Gheorghe Popescu (8/0), Dorin Semeghin (1/0), Flavius Stoican (21/0), Iosif Tâlvan (10/0), Gabriel Tamaş (21/3).

Midfielders: Dan Alexa (24/0), Mugur Bolohan (6/0), Ciprian Danciu (4/0), Ştefan Grigorie (23/2), Giani Kiriţă (23/1), Vlad Munteanu (21/2), Florin Pârvu (19/0), Florentin Petre (25/2), Iulian Tameş (20/2).

Forwards: Cosmin Bărcăuan (23/12), Ionel Dănciulescu (26/16), Claudiu Drăgan (12/0), Ciprian Marica (10/1), Nicolae Mitea (9/0), Claudiu Niculescu (2/5).

== Transfers ==
New players: Gh.Popescu (Lecce), Alexa, Grigorie, Stoican, Bărcăuan (all from U.Craiova).

Left team: Prunea, Bolohan (FCM Bacău), O.Stângă (U.Craiova), Zicu (Farul)
