= 2004–05 FC Dinamo București season =

FC Dinamo București
2004–05 season
- Manager: Ioan Andone
- Liga I: 2nd
- Romanian Cup: Winner
- UEFA Champions League: 3rd qual. rd.
- UEFA Cup: 1st round
- Top goalscorer: Claudiu Niculescu (21 goals)

The 2004–05 season was FC Dinamo București's 56th season in Liga I. For the 2004–05 season Dinamo's ambitions grew, but still many players left the club. Dinamo played a thrilling game vs. Manchester United in Bucharest in the third qualification round of the UEFA Champions League, but lost 1–2. This game was significant because it showed considerable progress from the last attempts to qualify for the group phase of the Champions League. The second leg was lost at Old Trafford 3–0. In the UEFA Cup 2004–05 season Dinamo was eliminated by Partizan Belgrade.

This time Dinamo had a better evolution during the season after the title victory. However, Dinamo lost the title to Steaua Bucharest on a costly error by Lucian Goian in the last seconds of the game with Rapid Bucharest close to the end of the season.

Dinamo won the Romanian Cup for the 12th time in history.

== Results ==
Divizia A
Round	Date	Opponent	Stadium	Result
1	31 July 2004	Farul Constanţa	A	0–1
2	6 August 2004	Sportul Studenţesc	H	2–1
3	3 November 2004	Poli Iași	A	3–2
4	22 August 2004	Steaua București	H	0–1
5	29 August 2004	CFR Cluj	A	2–4
6	12 September 2004	Naţional București	H	0–1
7	19 September 2004	FCM Bacău	A	2–0
8	26 September 2004	FC Brașov	H	3–1
9	3 October 2004	Poli Timişoara	A	3–2
10	16 October 2004	Gloria Bistriţa	H	4–1
11	24 October 2004	Rapid București	A	1–2
12	31 October 2004	Apulum Alba Iulia	H	4–2
13	6 November 2004	Oţelul Galaţi	A	0–2
14	21 November 2004	U Craiova	A	1–0
15	27 November 2004	FC Argeș	H	4–0
16	13 March 2005	Farul Constanţa	H	2–0
17	19 March 2005	Sportul Studenţesc	A	1–0
18	2 April 2005	Poli Iaşi	H	2–0
19	10 April 2005	Steaua București	A	0–1
20	16 April 2005	CFR Cluj	H	4–0
21	24 April 2005	Naţional București	A	1–5
22	27 April 2005	FCM Bacău	H	3–0
23	30 April 2005	FC Brașov	A	1–1
24	4 May 2005	Poli Timişoara	H	1–0
25	7 May 2005	Gloria Bistriţa	A	1–0
26	15 May 2005	Rapid București	H	2–2
27	18 May 2005	Apulum Alba Iulia	A	3–1
28	22 May 2005	Oţelul Galaţi	H	4–0
29	28 May 2005	U Craiova	H	5–0
30	7 June 2005	FC Argeș	A	1–0

Cupa României
Round	Date	Opponent	Stadium	Result
Last 32	13 October 2004	Olimpia Satu Mare	Satu Mare	1–1 (5-3p)
Last 16	27 October 2004	Gaz Metan Mediaş	Braşov	1–0
QF-1st leg	10 November 2004	Dacia Unirea Brăila	București	1–0
QF-2nd leg	1 December 2004	Dacia Unirea Brăila	Brăila	2–0
SF-1st leg	16 March 2005	Naţional București	București	1–2
SF-2nd leg	13 April 2005	Naţional București	București	4–0
Final	11 May 2005	Farul Constanţa	București	1–0

Cupa României 2004–05 Winners
Dinamo București
12th Title

== UEFA Champions League ==
Second qualifying round

28 July 2004
21:00

Žilina (Slovakia)	0–1	Dinamo București
		Dănciulescu 89'

Stadium Pod Dubňom, Žilina
Attendance: 4,268
Referee: Selçuk Dereli (Turkey)

4 August 2004
21:00

Dinamo București	1–0	(Slovakia) Žilina
Dănciulescu 19'

Stadionul Dinamo, Bucharest
Attendance: 13,000
Referee: Alan Kelly (Ireland)

Dinamo București won 2–0 on aggregate.

Third qualifying round

11 August 2004
21:45

Dinamo București	1–2	(England) Manchester United
Fortune 9' (o.g.)		Giggs 38'; Alistar 71' (o.g.)

Stadionul Național, Bucharest
Attendance: 55,000
Referee: Paulo Manuel Gomes Costa (Portugal)

25 August 2004
22:10

Manchester United (England)	3–0	Dinamo București
Smith 47', 50'; Bellion 70'

Old Trafford, Manchester
Attendance: 61,041
Referee: Markus Merk (Germany)

Manchester United won 5-1 on aggregate.

== UEFA Cup ==
First round

16 September 2004
21:00

Partizan Belgrade (Serbia and Montenegro)	3–1	Dinamo București
Tomić 53'; Boya 54'; Brnović 86'		Dănciulescu 24'

Stadion FK Partizan, Belgrade
Attendance: 17,000
Referee: Knud Erik Fisker (Denmark)

30 September 2004
20:00

Dinamo București	0–0	(Serbia and Montenegro) Partizan Belgrade

Stadionul Național, Bucharest
Attendance: 16,000
Referee: Stéphane Bré (France)

Partizan won 3-1 on aggregate.

== Squad ==
Goalkeepers: Vladimir Gaev (12/0), Cristian Munteanu (6/0), Bogdan Stelea (13/0).

Defenders: Angelo Alistar (18/0), Ionuţ Bălan (14/1), Ovidiu Burcă (14/0), Liviu Ciobotariu (8/0), George Galamaz (22/0), Lucian Goian (6/0), Alin Ilin (2/0), Adrian Iordache (14/1), Cristian Irimia (11/0), Cristian Pulhac (11/2), Ştefan Radu (2/0), Dorin Semeghin (16/0), Gabriel Tamaș (13/0).

Midfielders: Ionuț Badea (18/0), Adrian Cristea (10/0), Ştefan Grigorie (25/10), Andrei Mărgăritescu (29/2), Vlad Munteanu (4/0), Leonard Naidin (1/0), Alexandru Păcurar (14/1), Florentin Petre (24/2), Dennis Şerban (3/0), Iulian Tameş (11/0).

Forwards: Alexandru Bălţoi (18/3), Ionel Dănciulescu (15/11), Claudiu Drăgan (2/0), Adrian Mihalcea (17/1), Tibor Moldovan (5/1), Claudiu Niculescu (28/21), Ianis Zicu (13/3).

== Transfers ==
New players: Summer break - Matache (Metalul Plopeni), Galamaz (Rapid București), Irimia (Rapid București), Ciobotariu (Royal Antwerp), Onuț, Bălan and Bălțoi (Farul Constanța), Goian (Ceahlăul Piatra-Neamț), Mărgăritescu (Unirea Focșani), Păcurar (Universitatea Cluj-Napoca), D.Șerban (Petrolul Ploiești)

Winter break - Tamaș (Spartak Moskva), Ad.Cristea (Politehnica Iași), T.Moldovan (Apulum Alba-Iulia), Zicu (AC Parma)

Left team: Summer break - Șt.Preda (FC Argeș Pitești), Alexa (Beijing Guan), Bărcăuan (Shakhtar Donetsk), Onuț (Politehnica Iași), Cr.Ciubotariu (Politehnica Iași), Perenyi (Politehnica Iași)

Winter break - Cr.Munteanu (FC Național București), Cr.Irimia (Dinamo Kyiv), Naidin (Poli Timișoara), D.Șerban (Larissa), Vl.Munteanu (FC Național București), Tameș (Alania Vladikavkaz), Cl.Drăgan (Universitatea Craiova), Dănciulescu (Shandong Luneng Taishan), Cigan (Liberty Salonta)
