= Florin Matache =

Romanian footballer

Personal information
- Date of birth: 3 August 1982 (age 44)
- Place of birth: Bucharest, Romania
- Height: 1.90 m (6 ft 3 in)
- Position: Goalkeeper

Team information
- Current team: Concordia Chiajna (GK coach)

Youth career
- –2001: Metalul Plopeni

Senior career*
Years	Team	Apps	(Gls)
2001–2004	Metalul Plopeni	43	(0)
2004–2009	Dinamo II București	75	(0)
2005–2009	Dinamo București	12	(0)
2007	→ Ceahlăul Piatra Neamț (loan)	3	(0)
2008	→ Otopeni (loan)	9	(0)
2010–2012	Universitatea Cluj	30	(0)
2013	Damila Măciuca	10	(0)
2013–2014	CSM Râmnicu Vâlcea	26	(0)
2014–2016	Concordia Chiajna	38	(0)
2016–2017	Academica Clinceni	30	(0)
2017–2018	Flacăra Horezu		
2019	Turris Turnu Măgurele	0	(0)
Total		276	(0)

Managerial career
- 2018–2019: Flacăra Horezu (assistant)
- 2019: Turris Turnu Măgurele (player/GK coach)
- 2019: Concordia Chiajna (GK coach)
- 2020: Turris Turnu Măgurele (GK coach)
- 2021–2024: Concordia Chiajna (GK coach)
- 2024: Voluntari (GK coach)
- 2026: CS Dinamo București (GK coach)
- 2026–: Concordia Chiajna (GK coach)
- * Club domestic league appearances and goals

Florin Matache (born 3 August 1982) is a Romanian former professional footballer who played as a goalkeeper, currently goalkeeping coach at Liga II club Concordia Chiajna.

== Career ==
Matache was born on 3 August 1982 in Bucharest, Romania and began playing football at Metalul Plopeni during the 2001–02 Divizia B season. In 2004 he signed with Dinamo București where he initially played for the club's satellite team. Matache made his debut for the first team on 7 June 2006 when coach Florin Marin sent him in the 54th minute of an away Liga I match against Politehnica Timișoara to replace Florentin Petre. This was because the starting goalkeeper, Cristian Munteanu, had received a red card. Matache managed to keep a clean sheet as the game ended in a 0–0 draw. In the following season, Matache helped the club win the title, being used by coach Mircea Rednic in seven games, as he had to compete with international goalkeepers Bogdan Lobonț and Uladzimir Hayew. In the same season he played three games in the early stages of the UEFA Cup campaign, helping the club eliminate Beitar Jerusalem and Skoda Xanthi as they reached the round of 32. Next season he was loaned for the first half to Ceahlăul Piatra Neamț, then for the second half at Liga II team, Otopeni which he helped earn promotion to the first league. Afterwards, Matache returned to Dinamo, helping the club achieve what was dubbed "The wonder from Liberec" by winning the away game against Slovan Liberec 3–0. This victory, which matched the score of the lost first leg, allowed them to qualify for the group stage of the 2009–10 Europa League after a penalty shoot-out where he saved two penalties, earning him the nickname "The Hero from Liberec". His performance in the match earned him a grade 10 from the Gazeta Sporturilor newspaper. In January 2010 he joined Universitatea Cluj in the second league where he was wanted by his former coach from Ceahlăul, Viorel Hizo, helping the club get promoted to the first league. In January 2013, Matache returned to the second league when he signed with Damila Măciuca, working there with coach Claudiu Niculescu who had been his former teammate at Dinamo. For the 2013–14 Liga II season he and coach Niculescu went to CSM Râmnicu Vâlcea. In the summer of 2014, Matache signed with Concordia Chiajna, returning for a final spell in Liga I football, a competition in which he eventually made a total of 71 appearances. He reached with Chiajna the 2016 Cupa Ligii final but coach Emil Săndoi preferred to use Cristian Bălgrădean in the eventual 2–1 loss to Steaua București. In the following years he played in the Romanian lower leagues for Academica Clinceni and Flacăra Horezu, helping the latter get promoted from the fourth to the third league, retiring in 2019.

In a poll organised by the Prosport newspaper in 2024, Matache was selected the best goalkeeper of Dinamo București's last 25 years.

== Honours ==
Dinamo București

- Liga I: 2006–07

Concordia Chiajna

- Cupa Ligii runner-up: 2015–16

Flacăra Horezu

- Liga IV: 2017–18
