= 2001–02 FC Dinamo București season =

FC Dinamo București
2001–02 season
- Manager: Marin Ion (rounds 1-23); Cornel Dinu (rounds 24-30)
- Liga I: 1st
- Romanian Cup: Finalist
- UEFA Cup: 1st round
- Top goalscorer: Claudiu Niculescu (15 goals)

The 2001–02 season was FC Dinamo București's 53rd season in Divizia A. In this season, Dinamo became Romanian champions for the 16th time in history. Dinamo was eliminated quickly from the UEFA Cup, and concentrated only on the internal competition. Thus, after the first half of the season, Dinamo was leader with two points over the revelation FC Național. In March 2002, Dinamo defeated Rapid 3–2, and distanced itself to five points at the front of the standings, and Cristian Borcea, Dinamo's president, launched after the game the famous sentence: "Let us prepare for the Champions League"

Finally, Dinamo won the title in the last round of games, with a win against FC Braşov, and at the same time a defeat for FC Naţional, leader before that round, at Universitatea Craiova.

In the Romanian Cup, Dinamo was defeated in the final by Rapid.

== Results ==
Divizia A
Round	Date	Opponent	Stadium	Result
1	4 August 2001	Ceahlăul	H	3–1
2	12 August 2001	Rapid	A	2–2
3	17 August 2001	UM Timișoara	H	5–1
4	26 August 2001	Oțelul	A	1–2
5	8 September 2001	Farul	A	2–2
6	16 September 2001	Sportul Studențesc	H	5–1
7	23 September 2001	Astra Ploiești	A	1–1
8	30 September 2001	FCM Bacău	H	4–2
9	13 October 2001	Univ. Craiova	A	2–0
10	21 October 2001	FC Național	H	0–0
11	28 October 2001	Gloria Bistrița	A	2–1
12	3 November 2001	Steaua	H	2–0
13	17 November 2001	FC Argeș	A	2–1
14	24 November 2001	Petrolul Ploiești	H	4–1
15	2 December 2001	FC Brașov	A	1–1
16	10 March 2002	Ceahlăul	A	2–1
17	17 March 2002	Rapid	H	3–2
18	23 March 2002	UM Timișoara	A	3–0
19	31 March 2002	Oțelul Galați	H	2–2
20	6 April 2002	Farul	H	1–1
21	13 April 2002	Sportul Studențesc	A	0–1
22	20 April 2002	Astra Ploiești	H	1–1
23	27 April 2002	FCM Bacău	A	2–4
24	1 May 2002	Univ. Craiova	H	2–0
25	4 May 2002	FC Național	A	0–1
26	15 May 2002	Gloria Bistrița	H	1–0
27	19 May 2002	Steaua	A	2–2
28	22 May 2002	FC Argeș	H	2–1
29	25 May 2002	Petrolul Ploiești	A	2–1
30	1 June 2002	FC Brașov	H	4–0

Divizia A 2001–02 Winners
Dinamo București
16th Title

Cupa României
Round	Date	Opponent	Stadium	Result
Last 32	10 October 2001	Electromagnetica	București	3–2
Last 16	31 October 2001	Sportul Studențesc	București	6–0
Quarterfinals	3 April 2002	FC Brașov	Buzău	0–0 (3–2 a.pen.)
SF-1st leg	24 April 2002	Steaua	Away	1–0
SF-2nd leg	8 May 2002	Steaua	Home	3–1
Final	5 June 2002	Rapid	București	1–2

== UEFA Cup ==
Qualifying round

9 August 2001
18:00

Dinamo București	1–0	(Albania) Dinamo Tirana
Niculescu 34' (pen.)

Stadionul Dinamo, Bucharest
Attendance: 10,000
Referee: Nikolaos Agelakis (Greece)

23 August 2001
18:00

Dinamo Tirana (Albania)	1–3	Dinamo București
Onuț 87' (o.g.)		Niculescu 15'; Mihalcea 43'; Drăgan 76'

Qemal Stafa Stadium, Tirana
Attendance: 2,000
Referee: Zsolt Szabó (Hungary)

FC Dinamo won 4–1 on aggregate

First round

20 September 2001
16:00

Dinamo București	1–3	(Switzerland) Grasshoppers
Mihalcea 84' (pen.)		Chapuisat 28'; Mwaruwari 81'; Núñez 87'

Stadionul Dinamo, Bucharest
Attendance: 8,000
Referee: Dany Koren (Israel)

27 September 2001
20:00

Grasshoppers (Switzerland)	3–1	Dinamo București
Baturina 18'; Chapuisat 21'; Morales 87'		Mihalcea 52' (pen.)

Hardturm, Zürich
Referee: Miroslav Liba (Czech Republic)

Grasshoppers won 6–2 on aggregate

== Squad ==
Goalkeepers: Bogdan Lobonț (22 / 0); Florin Prunea (6 / 0); Alexandru Iliuciuc (2 / 0).
Defenders: Mugur Bolohan (26 / 5); Adrian Iordache (1 / 0); Sorin Iodi (11 / 0); Giani Kiriță (28 / 2); Valentin Năstase (13 / 2); Bogdan Onuț (27 / 2); Iosif Tâlvan (26 / 0); Marian Vătavu (11 / 0); Dorin Semeghin (13 / 1); Cristian Pulhac (1 / 0).
Midfielders: Romulus Buia (9 / 0); Constantin Ilie (10 / 0); Ioan Lupescu (7 / 0); Vlad Munteanu (19 / 5); Florin Pârvu (20 / 1); Răzvan Pădurețu (1 / 0); Florentin Petre (10 / 1); Cătălin Rață (1 / 0); Ovidiu Stîngă (18 / 0); Iulian Tameș (29 / 6); Ianis Zicu (16 / 2).
Forwards: Bogdan Aldea (1 / 0); Alexandru Bălțoi (4 / 0); Ionel Dănciulescu (13 / 3); Claudiu Drăgan (23 / 4); Sabin Ilie (7 / 3); Adrian Mihalcea (14 / 11); Claudiu Niculescu (28 / 15); Ciprian Marica (2 / 0).
(league appearances and goals listed in brackets)

Manager: Marin Ion / Cornel Dinu.

== Transfers ==
New players: Claudiu Niculescu(U.Craiova), Ovidiu Stângă (PSV Eindhoven), Bogdan Lobonţ (Ajax Amsterdam), Ionel Dănciulescu (Steaua), Ionuţ Ilie (Ceahlăul)

Left team: Vali Năstase, Mihalcea (Genoa), Buia (Gloria Bistriţa), Lupescu (Al Hilal Riyadh), Semeghin (Petrolul), Sabin Ilie (FC Naţional).
