= 2007–08 FC Dinamo București season =

FC Dinamo București
2007–08 season
- Manager: Mircea Rednic (rounds 1-6), Walter Zenga (rounds 7-16), Cornel Țălnar (rounds 17-21, 27-34), Gheorghe Mulțescu (rounds 22-26)
- Liga I: 4th
- Romanian Cup: Quarterfinals
- UEFA Champions League: 3rd qual. round
- UEFA Cup: 1st round
- Top goalscorer: Ionel Dănciulescu (21 goals)

The 2007–08 season was FC Dinamo București's 59th season in Liga I. The season found the Dinamo fans hoping for another title in Romania and a qualification in the group stage of the UEFA Champions League.

== Champions League ==
Dinamo entered the competition in the third qualifying round, and faced Lazio. The two clubs contested the first leg in Rome at the Stadio Olimpico on 14 August and the second leg on 28 August on Lia Manoliu National Stadium. The first leg ended in a 1–1 draw; Ionel Danciulescu scored first with a perfect header after a cross from Cristian Pulhac, but Lazio equalised in the second-half with a header from Massimo Mutarelli. In the first-half, Bogdan Lobonț saved a penalty from Tommaso Rocchi after Ștefan Radu committed had committed a handball in the penalty area.

The second leg was played on Lia Manoliu National Stadium. The first half ended in a 1–0 lead for Dinamo thanks to a goal scored by Florin Bratu on a 30-meter sprint. Dinamo, however, conceded three goals in the second-half, caused by three defensive mistakes, the first being a penalty kick scored by Rocchi after a foul by Valentin Nastase, who left the team following the match. The game ended in a 3–1 loss for Dinamo, thus eliminating them from the Champions League. The elimination led also Mircea Rednic to resign from his head coaching position, being replaced by Walter Zenga.

== UEFA Cup ==
Dinamo challenged Sweden champions IF Elfsborg in the UEFA Cup first round and were eliminated after a 1–2 loss at home and a 1–0 win in Borås. Dinamo's only achievable goal remained the Romanian Championship. Winning the title would have qualified it directly to next season's Champions League group stage.

== Managerial changes ==
Walter Zenga left Dinamo after two disappointing derbies against Rapid București at home (0–2) and Steaua București away (1–0) with a poor defensive play that was opposing with the team's very strong playing offensive. After collecting zero points in these crucial games, he was replaced by Cornel Țălnar with whom Dinamo had a debut in Liga I 3–1 against UTA Arad on 1 December 2007.

On 4 March 2008, Gheorghe Multescu replaced Țălnar but he resigned after only 27 days in charge. After Multescu's resignment, Talnar was again inserted as coach until the end of the championship, having very good final matches against Rapid (2–1) and Steaua (2–1). Dinamo ultimately finished the year in fourth place, qualifying for the subsequent season's UEFA Cup.

== Results ==
Liga I
Round	Date	Opponent	Stadium	Result
1	29 July 2007	Gloria Buzău	A	2–1
2	4 August 2007	FC Vaslui	H	0–2
3	10 August 2007	Ceahlăul Piatra Neamț	A	3–0
4	18 August 2007	Dacia Mioveni	H	1–1
5	24 October 2007	Farul Constanța	A	1–0
6	1 September 2007	Gloria Bistrița	H	0–1
7	15 September 2007	Politehnica Iaşi	A	5–2
8	23 September 2007	U Cluj	H	2–1
9	30 September 2007	CFR Cluj	A	1–1
10	7 October 2007	Oțelul Galați	H	6–1
11	21 October 2007	Pandurii Târgu Jiu	A	1–0
12	27 October 2007	Politehnica Timișoara	H	1–1
13	31 October 2007	Unirea Urziceni	A	0–0
14	3 November 2007	Universitatea Craiova	A	1–1
15	11 November 2007	Rapid București	H	0–2
16	24 November 2007	Steaua București	A	0–1
17	1 December 2007	UTA Arad	H	3–1
18	8 December 2007	Gloria Buzău	H	2–0
19	16 December 2007	FC Vaslui	A	1–2
20	22 February 2008	Ceahlăul Piatra Neamț	H	2–1
21	1 March 2008	Dacia Mioveni	A	2–1
22	9 March 2008	Farul Constanța	H	0–0
23	14 March 2008	Gloria Bistrița	A	1–1
24	19 March 2008	Politehnica Iaşi	H	2–1
25	22 March 2008	U Cluj	A	2–1
26	30 March 2008	CFR Cluj	H	1–2
27	5 April 2008	Oțelul Galați	A	1–0
28	9 April 2008	Pandurii Târgu Jiu	H	1–2
29	12 April 2008	Politehnica Timișoara	A	1–1
30	20 April 2008	Unirea Urziceni	H	1–1
31	23 April 2008	Universitatea Craiova	H	4–4
32	26 April 2008	Rapid București	A	2–1
33	4 May 2008	Steaua București	H	2–1
34	7 May 2008	UTA Arad	A	3–1

Cupa României
Round	Date	Opponent	Stadium	Result
Last 32	27 September 2007	Progresul București	București	2–0
Last 16	5 December 2007	Sănătatea Cluj-Napoca	Cluj-Napoca	4–0
Quarterfinals	27 February 2008	Dacia Mioveni	Urziceni	0–1

== Europe ==
=== UEFA Champions League ===
Third qualifying round

14 August 2007
21:45

Lazio (Italy)	1–1	Dinamo București
Mutarelli 54'		Dănciulescu 22'

Stadio Olimpico, Rome
Attendance: 53,000
Referee: Tom Henning Øvrebø (Norway)

28 August 2007
22:00

Dinamo București	1–3	(Italy) Lazio
Bratu 27'		Rocchi 47' (pen.), 66'; Pandev 53'

Stadionul Național, Bucharest
Attendance: 50,000
Referee: Manuel Mejuto González (Spain)

Lazio won 4–2 on aggregate.

=== UEFA Cup ===
First round

20 September 2007
20:30

Dinamo București	1–2	(Sweden) Elfsborg
Niculescu 8'		Keene 10', 30'

Stadionul Național, Bucharest
Attendance: 6,000
Referee: Joao Francisco Lopes Ferreira (Portugal)

4 October 2007
20:00

Elfsborg (Sweden)	0–1	Dinamo București
		Dănciulescu 31' (pen.)

Borås Arena, Borås
Attendance: 11,000
Referee: Mark Courtney (Northern Ireland)

Elfsborg won due to away goals.

== Squad ==
Goalkeepers: Bogdan Lobonț (32/0), Deniss Romanovs (2/0).

Defenders: George Blay (18/0), Zie Diabaté (1/0), Mariano Fernández (2/0), John Galliquio (8/0), Lucian Goian (18/1), Ivan Gvozdenović (2/0), Silviu Izvoranu (22/0), Cosmin Moți (23/1), Nicolae Mușat (2/0), Valentin Năstase (2/0), Nino Pekaric (3/0), Cristian Pulhac (29/0), Ștefan Radu (19/0), Adrian Scarlatache (1/0), Flavius Stoican (7/0), Blaže Todorovski (2/0).

Midfielders: Gabriel Boștină (20/0), Hristu Chiacu (10/0), Adrian Cristea (32/8), Fabrice Fernandes (2/0), Andrei Mărgăritescu (26/2), Cătălin Munteanu (30/1), Georgian Păun (2/0), Adrian Ropotan (30/0), Gabriel Torje (15/1), Vojislav Vranjković (6/0).

Forwards: Florin Bratu (26/14), Ionel Dănciulescu (32/21), Liviu Ganea (5/0), Osvaldo Miranda (11/2), Claudiu Niculescu (16/2), Daniel Oprița (5/0), Ianis Zicu (12/2).

== Transfers ==
New players: Valentin Năstase (Ascoli Calcio), Flavius Stoican (Shakhtar Donetsk), Silviu Izvoranu (Politehnica Timișoara), Daniel Opriţa (Steaua București), Florin Bratu (FC Nantes-Atlantique), Ianis Zicu (Internazionale Milano), Hristu Chiacu (Wisła Kraków), Gabriel Torje (Politehnica Timișoara).

Left team: Florin Matache (Ceahlăul Piatra-Neamţ), Sergiu Homei (Politehnica Iaşi), Silviu Bălace (FC Vaslui), Constantin Bumbac (FCM UTA Arad), Adrian Scarlatache (Pandurii Târgu-Jiu), Lucian Goian (Ceahlăul Piatra-Neamţ), Vojislav Vranjković -Serbia- (Ceahlăul Piatra-Neamţ), Zé Kalanga -Angola- (FC Boavista Porto), Cornel Predescu (Dacia Mioveni), Alexandru Bălţoi (FCM UTA Arad), Jean Philip Mendy -France- (Petrolul Ploieşti), Valentin Năstase (free player, round 6), Fabrice Fernandes (free player, round 4)
