= Ianis Zicu =

Romanian footballer (born 1983)

Personal information
- Full name: Ianis Alin Zicu
- Date of birth: 23 October 1983 (age 43)
- Place of birth: Constanța, Romania
- Height: 1.79 m (5 ft 10 in)
- Positions: Attacking midfielder; winger

Team information
- Current team: Metaloglobus București (head coach)

Youth career
- 1994–1998: Farul Constanța
- 1998–2000: Dinamo București

Senior career*
| Years | Team | Apps | (Gls) |
| 2001–2003 | Dinamo București | 33 | (9) |
| 2002 | → Poiana Câmpina (loan) | 6 | (4) |
| 2002–2003 | → Farul Constanța (loan) | 20 | (7) |
| 2004–2007 | Inter Milan | 0 | (0) |
| 2004 | → Parma (loan) | 9 | (0) |
| 2005–2006 | → Dinamo București (loan) | 40 | (12) |
| 2006–2007 | → Rapid București (loan) | 30 | (12) |
| 2007–2010 | Dinamo București | 39 | (5) |
| 2010–2011 | Politehnica Timișoara | 30 | (18) |
| 2011 | CSKA Sofia | 15 | (13) |
| 2012 | Pohang Steelers | 15 | (6) |
| 2012 | → Gangwon (loan) | 17 | (9) |
| 2013–2014 | Gangwon | 27 | (6) |
| 2014 | Petrolul Ploiești | 10 | (0) |
| 2014–2015 | ASA Târgu Mureș | 30 | (5) |
| 2015–2016 | ACS Poli Timișoara | 26 | (4) |
| 2016 | ASA Târgu Mureș | 20 | (5) |
| Total | | 367 | (115) |

International career
| 2000 | Romania U18 | 3 | (3) |
| 2001 | Romania U19 | 6 | (3) |
| 2002–2005 | Romania U21 | 14 | (3) |
| 2003–2011 | Romania | 12 | (1) |

Managerial career
- 2019: Voluntari U18
- 2019–2021: Farul Constanța
- 2021: Unirea Constanța
- 2022: Concordia Chiajna
- 2023–2025: Metaloglobus București
- 2025–2026: Farul Constanța
- 2026–: Metaloglobus București
- * Club domestic league appearances and goals

Ianis Alin Zicu (born 23 October 1983) is a Romanian professional football manager and former player who played as a midfielder, currently in charge of Liga II club Metaloglobus București.

== Club career ==
=== Early career, Dinamo București and loans ===
Zicu was born on 23 October 1983 in Constanța, Romania and began playing junior-level football at local club Farul, under the guidance of coach Iosif Bükössy. In 2000, Zicu joined Dinamo București, making his Divizia A debut at the age of 17, under coach Cornel Dinu on 14 April 2001 in a 4–2 win over Gaz Metan Mediaș. He scored his first goal in a 4–3 loss to Astra Ploiești in the same season. He won his first trophy when coach Dinu sent him in the 90th minute to replace Marius Niculae in the 4–2 victory against Rocar București in the 2001 Cupa României final. In the following season, Zicu helped the team win the title by scoring two goals in the 16 appearances given to him by coaches Dinu and Marin Ion. During the same season he also played a few games in Divizia B for Poiana Câmpina, then a satellite team of Dinamo. He made his debut in European competitions when he replaced Claudiu Niculescu in the 63rd minute of a 3–1 home loss to Grasshopper Zürich in the first round of the 2001–02 UEFA Cup. Zicu returned to Farul for the 2002–03 season, being loaned there by Dinamo to play more and gain experience. He came back to The Red Dogs for the first half of the 2003–04 season, performing well by scoring six goals in the 13 league matches coach Ioan Andone used him. He also helped the team eliminate Liepājas Metalurgs and Shakhtar Donetsk in the UEFA Cup by scoring his first two goals in European competitions against each of them. However, he was transferred in the middle of the season to Inter Milan, but Dinamo still managed to win The Double without him.

=== Inter Milan and loans ===
In January 2004, Zicu was transferred by Inter Milan from Dinamo for €2.5 million, but the club immediately loaned him to Parma, as part of the Adriano Leite Ribeiro deal. His Serie A debut for The Crusaders came under coach Cesare Prandelli on 21 February 2004 in a 2–1 win against Sampdoria, making a total of seven appearances in the competition by the end of the season. In the next season, as Prandelli left the club, Zicu was used rarely, but one of his appearances was in the group stage of the 2004–05 UEFA Cup in a 1–0 victory against Steaua București. However, he left in the middle of the season to go on loan to Dinamo for one and a half years.

Upon his return, Zicu helped The Red Dogs win the 2004–05 Cupa României, being sent by Andone in the 56th minute to replace Ovidiu Burcă in the 1–0 victory against Farul in the final. He started the following season by coming as a substitute to replace Vlad Munteanu in the 69th minute of the 3–2 victory against rivals Steaua which helped the club earn its first Supercupa României. Subsequently, the team reached the group stage of the 2005–06 UEFA Cup, after eliminating Omonia Nicosia against whom he scored a brace in the first leg and Everton against whom he scored a goal in the historical 5–2 victory on aggregate. After the goal scored against the latter, the British newspaper Daily Mirror wrote about Zicu:"There is no doubt. The Romanian has class". In August 2005, Zicu drew negative attention during a 1–0 loss to Farul when, in the 22nd minute, after bypassing the goalkeeper and finding himself alone in a central position without opponents, he missed an open goal by kicking the ball beyond the post, later stating:"I lost the match. It's my fault and I take full responsibility. I don't know if I'll have nightmares, but I'll definitely think a lot about this miss".

For the 2006–07 season he remained in his country, because Inter had loaned him this time to Rapid București. Zicu had a remarkable spell with The Railwaymen, as under coach Răzvan Lucescu he scored 12 league goals, and helped the club reach the UEFA Cup group stage. The team also won the Cupa României, with Zicu scoring the second goal of the 2–0 victory against Politehnica Timișoara in the final when he was also named "The man of the match".

=== Third spell at Dinamo București ===
Freed from his contract with Inter Milan, Zicu returned to Dinamo București. He signed a four-year deal with the reigning champions, having been sought by coach Mircea Rednic, with the aim of reaching the Champions League group stage. However, in the 6th minute of the first leg in the third qualifying round against Lazio Roma, he left the field after having his right knee injured by Guglielmo Stendardo, and his side lost with 4–2 on aggregate. That injury kept him off the field for six months. After returning in February 2009, he suffered another injury in April of the same year during a 4–4 draw against Universitatea Craiova, leading to an 11-month absence from the field. During the period between the two injuries, he also played for the team's satellite, Dinamo II, in the second league. He scored a spectacular goal for them by flicking the ball with the heel over the goalkeeper after receiving a 60-meter pass in a 5–2 loss to FC Botoșani. This goal gained attention, even from the Italian press, with Corriere dello Sport writing:"What a great goal the former Inter player scored." In the 2009–10 Europa League, he helped Dinamo achieve what was dubbed "The wonder from Liberec" by winning the away game 3–0 against Slovan Liberec to force a penalty shoot-out after losing the first leg by the same score, ultimately qualifying to the group stage.

=== Politehnica Timișoara ===
On 21 July 2010, Zicu signed a five-year contract with Politehnica Timișoara which paid €300,000 to Dinamo for his transfer. He made his debut for the team in the second leg of the third qualifying round of the 2010–11 Europa League against MyPa. The Finns were leading 3–0 at half time, but Zicu scored his side's second goal in the 80th minute, and Marián Čišovský equalized in the 90+2 minute, completing an amazing comeback in the second half. As they had won the first leg with 2–1, Politehnica reached the competition's play-offs, where they were eliminated by Manchester City. Zicu enjoyed the most prolific season of his career, leading the league in scoring with a personal best of 18 goals, including three braces in victories against Rapid București, FCM Târgu Mureș and Gaz Metan Mediaș, which contributed to the team's second-place finish.

=== CSKA Sofia ===
On 16 June 2011, Zicu moved abroad to sign with Bulgarian club CSKA Sofia for three years. On 30 July, under coach Milen Radukanov, he made his competitive debut for CSKA in the Bulgarian Supercup against Litex Lovech, scoring a penalty to put his team up 2–1 in a match that ended in a 3–1 victory and secured the trophy. He also scored in his Bulgarian league debut that took place on 8 August in a 2–0 victory against Lokomotiv Sofia. During the same month, he played in both legs of the Europa League play-off for the group stage against Steaua București, losing 3–1 on aggregate. On 28 October, Zicu scored the only goal in the Eternal derby of Bulgaria to help CSKA earn a 1–0 home win over Levski Sofia. Subsequently, he scored a hat-trick on 12 November in a 3–1 home win over Minyor Pernik. He finished the first half of the 2011–12 A PFG season as the top-scorer of the league, having netted 13 times, forming a partnership in the team's offence with Júnior Moraes.

=== Pohang Steelers ===
In late December 2011, Zicu was transferred to South Korean club Pohang Steelers for an undisclosed fee, though media reports estimated it to be €2.3 million. He made his official debut as a starter on 18 February 2012 in the 2–0 win over Chonburi in an AFC Champions League play-off match. This victory helped them advance to the group stage, where he made three more appearances. Zicu scored his first goal for the team on 11 March 2012, in the 1–1 away draw against Gwangju in a K-League game. One week later he scored a brace in a 2–2 draw against Busan IPark, totaling six goals in 15 league appearances for Pohang. He also won the 2012 Korean FA Cup with them.

=== Gangwon ===
On 24 July 2012, he agreed to join the K League side Gangwon on a six-month loan deal until the end of the 2012 season. During this period he scored nine goals in 17 K-League appearances, including a hat-trick in a 5–3 away loss to Daejeon Citizen. In January 2013, Zicu was permanently transferred to Gangwon, scoring six goals in 27 matches for the team in the 2013 K League season.

=== Petrolul Ploiești ===
In January 2014, Zicu signed a contract for a year and a half with Petrolul Ploiești, a day after Adrian Mutu had joined the club. He was wanted there by coach Cosmin Contra who had been his teammate and coach at Politehnica Timișoara. After only half a year in which he did not manage to score or provide assists, he and the club agreed to terminate his contract.

=== ASA Târgu Mureș ===
In July 2014, Zicu moved to the newly promoted ASA Târgu Mureș, where he signed a contract for one season. The team was close to winning the league, and Zicu was one of its best players. A significant highlight was his decisive goal in a 1–0 away win against Steaua București, which propelled ASA to the top spot with five rounds left in the season. Eventually, they finished in second place, losing the title to Steaua in the last round when they were defeated 2–1 by Oțelul Galați.

=== Poli Timișoara ===
For the 2015–16 season, Zicu played again for a newly promoted club, returning to Timișoara at ACS Poli. However, the one-year spell was unsuccessful as the team was mathematically relegated, but managed to keep its position in the league because Rapid București went bankrupt.

=== Second spell at ASA Târgu Mureș ===
Zicu returned to ASA Târgu Mureș in July 2016. There, he spent the last season of his career, leaving in January 2017 as the club had financial problems and did not pay him for several months. The team was also relegated at the end of the season. The highlight of this period was a brace scored in a 2–1 win over his former club, Dinamo București. He made his last Liga I appearance on 10 December 2016 against the same team, this time losing with 1–0, totaling 278 games with 77 goals in the competition.

== International career ==
Between 2000 and 2005, Zicu made several appearances for Romania's under-18, under-19 and under-21 sides. He was banned alongside teammate Lucian Goian from representing his country at any level for two years in 2004, because the Romanian Football Federation considered they had a "defiant attitude" during a 4–1 loss against Czech Republic U21.

Zicu played 12 games and scored one goal for Romania, making his debut on 11 October 2003 when coach Anghel Iordănescu sent him in the 82nd minute to replace Daniel Pancu in a 1–1 friendly draw against Japan. He made three appearances in three victories during the successful Euro 2008 qualifiers. Coach Victor Pițurcă considered selecting him for the final tournament squad, but could not as Zicu was injured. He also played three games in the Euro 2012 qualifiers, scoring the last goal in a 3–1 win over Luxembourg. Zicu made his last appearance for the national team on 11 June 2011 in a 2–0 friendly loss to Paraguay, played at Estadio Defensores del Chaco in Asunción.

== Managerial career ==
Zicu began coaching in January 2019, when he took over Voluntari's under-18 team. He started coaching a senior team in July 2019, as he was named the head coach of Farul Constanța, a position he held until May 2021. Subsequently, he continued to work for second-tier teams such as Unirea Constanța, Concordia Chiajna and Metaloglobus București. Zicu helped the latter earn promotion to Liga I at the end of the 2024–25 season. Afterwards, he was appointed head coach at Farul in the first league. However, in April 2026, after a 1–0 loss to Hermannstadt, Zicu decided to resign.

== Personal life ==
Zicu is an ethnic Aromanian.

== Career statistics ==
=== Club ===
Appearances and goals by club, season and competition
| Club | Season | League | | | National cup (Note: Includes Cupa României, Coppa Italia, Bulgarian Cup, Korean FA Cup) | | Continental | | Other | | Total | |
| Club | Season | Division | Apps | Goals | Apps | Goals | Apps | Goals | Apps | Goals | Apps | Goals |
|---|---|---|---|---|---|---|---|---|---|---|---|---|
| Dinamo București | 2000–01 | Divizia A | 4 | 1 | 1 | 0 | 0 | 0 | — | | 5 | 1 |
| Dinamo București | 2001–02 | Divizia A | 16 | 2 | 2 | 0 | 1 (Note: Appearances in UEFA Cup) | 0 | — | | 19 | 2 |
| Dinamo București | 2003–04 | Divizia A | 13 | 6 | 3 | 4 | 6 | 2 | 1 (Note: Appearance in Supercupa României) | 0 | 24 | 12 |
| Dinamo București | Total | | 33 | 9 | 6 | 4 | 7 | 2 | 1 | 0 | 47 | 15 |
| Poiana Câmpina (loan) | 2001–02 | Divizia B | 6 | 4 | — | | — | | — | | 6 | 4 |
| Farul Constanța (loan) | 2002–03 | Divizia A | 20 | 7 | 3 | 0 | — | | — | | 23 | 7 |
| Parma | 2003–04 | Serie A | 7 | 0 | — | | — | | — | | 7 | 0 |
| Parma | 2004–05 | Serie A | 2 | 0 | 1 | 0 | 1 | 0 | — | | 4 | 0 |
| Parma | Total | | 9 | 0 | 1 | 0 | 1 | 0 | — | | 11 | 0 |
| Dinamo București (loan) | 2004–05 | Divizia A | 13 | 3 | 3 | 2 | 0 | 0 | — | | 16 | 5 |
| Dinamo București (loan) | 2005–06 | Divizia A | 27 | 9 | 2 | 0 | 6 | 3 | 1 | 0 | 36 | 12 |
| Dinamo București (loan) | Total | | 40 | 12 | 5 | 2 | 6 | 3 | 1 | 0 | 52 | 17 |
| Rapid București (loan) | 2006–07 | Liga I | 30 | 12 | 5 | 5 | 8 | 0 | 1 | 0 | 44 | 17 |
| Dinamo București | 2007–08 | Liga I | 12 | 2 | 1 | 0 | 1 (Note: Appearances in UEFA Champions League) | 0 | 1 | 0 | 15 | 2 |
| Dinamo București | 2008–09 | Liga I | 9 | 3 | 2 | 0 | 0 | 0 | — | | 11 | 3 |
| Dinamo București | 2009–10 | Liga I | 18 | 0 | 3 | 1 | 5 (Note: Appearances in UEFA Europa League) | 0 | — | | 26 | 1 |
| Dinamo București | Total | | 39 | 5 | 6 | 1 | 6 | 0 | 1 | 0 | 52 | 6 |
| Politehnica Timișoara | 2010–11 | Liga I | 30 | 18 | 1 | 0 | 3 | 1 | — | | 34 | 19 |
| CSKA Sofia | 2011–12 | A Group | 15 | 13 | 1 | 0 | 2 | 0 | 1 (Note: Appearance in Bulgarian Supercup) | 1 | 19 | 14 |
| Pohang Steelers | 2012 | K League | 15 | 6 | 1 | 0 | 4 (Note: Appearances in AFC Champions League) | 0 | — | | 20 | 6 |
| Gangwon (loan) | 2012 | K League | 17 | 9 | — | | — | | — | | 17 | 9 |
| Gangwon | 2013 | K League | 27 | 6 | 1 | 2 | — | | 2 (Note: Appearances in relegation play-offs) | 0 | 30 | 8 |
| Gangwon | Total | | 44 | 15 | 1 | 2 | — | | 2 | 0 | 47 | 17 |
| Petrolul Ploiești | 2013–14 | Liga I | 10 | 0 | 1 | 0 | — | | — | | 11 | 0 |
| ASA Târgu Mureș | 2014–15 | Liga I | 30 | 5 | 2 | 0 | — | | — | | 32 | 5 |
| ACS Poli Timișoara | 2015–16 | Liga I | 26 | 4 | 1 | 0 | — | | 1 (Note: Appearances in Cupa Ligii) | 0 | 28 | 4 |
| ASA Târgu Mureș | 2016–17 | Liga I | 20 | 5 | 0 | 0 | — | | 2 | 1 | 22 | 6 |
| Career total | | | 367 | 115 | 34 | 14 | 37 | 6 | 10 | 2 | 448 | 137 |

=== International ===
Appearances and goals by national team and year
| National team | Year | Apps | Goals |
|---|---|---|---|
| Romania | 2003 | 1 | 0 |
| Romania | 2006 | 1 | 0 |
| Romania | 2007 | 3 | 0 |
| Romania | 2010 | 1 | 0 |
| Romania | 2011 | 6 | 1 |
| Total | | 12 | 1 |

Scores and results list Romania's goal tally first, score column indicates score after each Zicu goal.

| # | Date | Venue | Opponent | Score | Result | Competition |
|---|---|---|---|---|---|---|
| 1 | 29 March 2011 | Stadionul Ceahlăul, Piatra Neamț, Romania | Luxembourg | 3–1 | 3–1 | UEFA Euro 2012 Qualifying |

== Managerial statistics ==
As of 31 October 2026

| Team | From | To | Record | | | | | | | |
| Team | From | To | G | W | D | L | GF | GA | GD | Win % |
|---|---|---|---|---|---|---|---|---|---|---|
| Farul Constanța | 3 July 2019 | 20 June 2021 | 53 | 23 | 13 | 17 | 68 | 53 | +15 | 43.40 |
| Unirea Constanța | 19 July 2021 | 17 August 2021 | 3 | 0 | 0 | 3 | 0 | 5 | −5 | 0.00 |
| Concordia Chiajna | 2 March 2022 | 20 September 2022 | 22 | 6 | 5 | 11 | 19 | 32 | −13 | 27.27 |
| Metaloglobus București | 11 September 2023 | 2 June 2025 | 52 | 23 | 12 | 17 | 63 | 60 | +3 | 44.23 |
| Farul Constanța | 3 June 2025 | 10 April 2026 | 38 | 13 | 10 | 15 | 48 | 41 | +7 | 34.21 |
| Metaloglobus București | 25 June 2026 | present | 13 | 5 | 3 | 5 | 18 | 18 | +0 | 38.46 |
| Total | | | 181 | 70 | 43 | 68 | 216 | 209 | +7 | 38.67 |

== Honours ==
Dinamo București

- Divizia A: 2001–02, 2003–04
- Cupa României: 2000–01, 2003–04, 2004–05
- Supercupa României: 2005

Rapid București

- Cupa României: 2006–07
- Supercupa României runner-up: 2006

CSKA Sofia

- Bulgarian Supercup: 2011

Pohang Steelers

- Korean FA Cup: 2012

Individual

- Liga I top scorer: 2010–11 (18 goals)
- Liga I Player of the Month: April 2015
