= Ionel Dănciulescu =

Romanian footballer

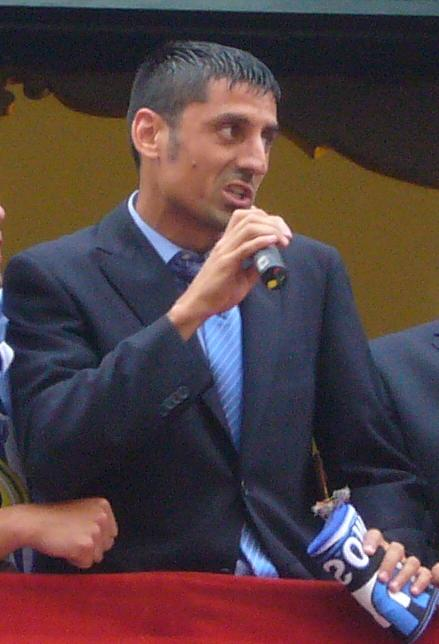
- Danciulescu celebrating promotion to La Liga with Hércules in 2010

Personal information
- Full name: Ionel Daniel Dănciulescu
- Date of birth: 6 December 1976 (age 49)
- Place of birth: Slatina, Romania
- Height: 1.80 m (5 ft 11 in)
- Position: Striker

Team information
- Current team: CS Dinamo București (general manager)

Youth career
- 1985–1991: CSȘ Slatina
- 1991–1993: Electroputere Craiova

Senior career*
Years	Team	Apps	(Gls)
1993–1995	Electroputere Craiova	31	(8)
1995–1997	Dinamo București	64	(22)
1997	Altay	7	(1)
1998–2001	Steaua București	129	(54)
2002–2009	Dinamo București	198	(103)
2005	→ Shandong Luneng (loan)	26	(10)
2009–2010	Hércules	25	(10)
2010–2013	Dinamo București	93	(27)
Total		574	(236)

International career
1994–1995	Romania U18	4	(1)
1996–1998	Romania U21	12	(4)
1996–2004	Romania B	10	(4)
1999–2009	Romania	8	(2)

Managerial career
- 2014–2018: Dinamo București (sporting director)
- 2014: Dinamo București (caretaker)
- 2018: Dinamo București (president)
- 2018: Farul Constanța (sporting director)
- 2018–2020: Dinamo București (team manager)
- 2020–: CS Dinamo București (general manager)
- * Club domestic league appearances and goals

Ionel Daniel Dănciulescu (born 6 December 1976) is a Romanian former professional footballer who played as a striker, currently general manager at Liga II club CS Dinamo București.

Dănciulescu held the all-time record for the most competitive appearances in Liga I, with 515 games played over the course of twenty years, until Dan Nistor broke his record in August 2026. He is the second-highest scorer in the history of Liga I with 214 goals, only behind Dudu Georgescu who netted 252. He also scored 35 goals in the Cupa României and remains the player with a record 36 appearances in the Dinamo – Steaua derby—scoring 13 goals across both sides (eight for Steaua and five for Dinamo)—thereby tying Florea Voinea as the fixture's joint top-scorer.

== Club career ==
=== Early years and Electroputere Craiova ===
Dănciulescu was born on 6 December 1976 in Slatina, Romania. He began playing junior-level football in his hometown at CSȘ Slatina, alongside Claudiu Niculescu, Ionuț Luțu and Augustin Chiriță under coach Ion Pârvulescu.

In 1993, Dănciulescu joined Electroputere Craiova, making his Divizia A debut at age 16 on 6 October 1993 under coach Ovidiu Drânceanu in a 2–2 draw against the city rival Universitatea Craiova. Over the course of two seasons with Electroputere, he scored eight goals in 31 league games; his first goal was in a 2–2 draw against Dinamo București, and he also netted a double in a 4–2 loss to Steaua București. During this time he played alongside the likes of Ștefan Nanu, Gabriel Popescu, Sabin Ilie and Claudiu Răducanu.

=== Dinamo București ===
In 1995, Electroputere was relegated to the second league, Dănciulescu having offers to remain in the first division, choosing to sign with Dinamo București after being convinced by the club's officials Mircea Stoenescu and Cornel Dinu. He spent two seasons with The Red Dogs, scoring 22 goals in 64 games Divizia A games, including his first hat-trick in the competition in a 3–0 win over AS Bacău.

=== Altay Izmir ===
During the first half of the 1997–98 season, Dănciulescu had a brief spell in the Turkish Super League with Altay. The Turkish club paid Dinamo around $400,000 for him and Marius Coporan at the request of coach Marian Bondrea, uniting them with fellow Romanian Dănuț Moisescu. His debut in the Turkish league took place on 3 August 1997 in a 1–0 away loss to Bursaspor. He played seven games for Altay and scored one goal against Beşiktaş.

=== Steaua București ===
Dănciulescu and Coporan returned to Romania from Turkey, after Steaua București paid Altay the same money they paid for their acquisition from Dinamo. Dănciulescu helped the club win the title in his first season spent at the club, being used by coach Mihai Stoichiță in 25 games in which he scored 14 goals, being the team's second top-scorer with three goals behind Cătălin Munteanu. In the following season, he helped secure the 1998–99 Cupa României title by playing the first 51 minutes of the final against Rapid București before being substituted by coach Emerich Jenei for Ionuț Luțu ahead of the team's eventual victory in the penalty shoot-out. Dănciulescu helped the club reach the round of 32 in the 1999–2000 UEFA Cup, playing seven games in the campaign as they got past Levadia Tallinn, LASK Linz against whom he scored a goal, and West Ham United, being eliminated by Slavia Prague. He won another league title in the 2000–01 season with The Military Men, contributing with six goals scored in the 26 appearances given to him by coach Victor Pițurcă. He also earned the nickname "Corbul" (The Raven) from his teammate Adrian Matei during this period.

In the middle of the 2001–02 season, Dănciulescu had a conflict with coach Pițurcă, having to leave the team.

=== Return to Dinamo București ===
He signed again with Dinamo București who paid $350,000 to Steaua for his transfer. At the beginning of this second spell he had probably the hardest time of his career, as the team's fans were cussing him at games because he played for Steaua and scored against Dinamo. Dănciulescu netted three goals in the 13 appearances given to him by coaches Cornel Dinu and Marin Ion as the team won the title at the end of the 2001–02 season. During that period, he even played in the second league at Poiana Câmpina, then a satellite team of Dinamo. He came back strong during the following season, scoring 16 goals in 26 league games, also helping the club win the Cupa României, being used by coach Ioan Andone for the entire match in the 1–0 victory against Național București in the final. The fans eventually accepted him as he became a top-scorer of the team. In the following years, Dănciulescu made a successful partnership in the team's offence with Claudiu Niculescu, and the Romanian press called them the "N&D couple", a nickname inspired by the first letters of their family names and the Romanian pop band "N&D".

He helped the team win The Double in the 2003–04 season, scoring 21 goals in the 29 league matches coach Andone used him, which made him the top-scorer of the season. However, Dănciulescu did not play in the 2–0 victory against Oțelul Galați in the Cupa României final as he was suspended after receiving a red card. In the same season he contributed to the elimination of Liepājas Metalurgs and Shakhtar Donetsk by scoring two goals against the first and one against the latter in the UEFA Cup. The campaign ended when they were eliminated in the second round of the competition by Spartak Moscow against whom he scored a brace in the second leg. In the first half of the following season he scored 11 goals in 15 league appearances. He also played in the Champions League qualifying rounds, scoring the goals in both 1–0 victories against Žilina. In the following round, his pressure led Quinton Fortune to score an own goal in the eventual 5–1 aggregate loss to Manchester United. These performances and his double scored for the national team in the 5–1 victory in the friendly against Germany, earned Dănciulescu the 2004 Romanian Footballer of the Year award.

In the 2006–07 season, Dănciulescu was the team's second top-scorer after Claudiu Niculescu as he netted 15 goals in the 31 appearances given to him by coach Mircea Rednic, including a spectacular scissors kick goal in a 4–2 victory in a derby against Steaua, helping the team win the title. In the first half of that season, Dănciulescu, Niculescu, and Ionel Ganea were part of a rotation system imposed by Rednic, as they were all prolific strikers but only two could start in any given match. He also appeared in 12 matches in which he scored five goals, as the club reached the round of 32 in the 2006–07 UEFA Cup where they lost with 3–1 on aggregate to Benfica. In the following season, Dinamo had the objective of reaching the Champions League group stage, Dănciulescu managing to score a goal with a header after a pass from Cristian Pulhac in the 1–1 draw from the first leg of the third qualifying round against Lazio Roma, but they did not qualify, losing with 3–1 the second leg. Dănciulescu formed a partnership in Dinamo's offence with Florin Bratu, and the Romanian press called them "BD in action", a nickname inspired by the first letters of their family names and the Romanian movie "BD in action". By the end of the 2007–08 season the team had no chance of winning the title, but rivals Steaua were in first position, having scheduled a match on Dinamo's ground. The match ended with a 2–1 victory for Dinamo with Dănciulescu and Bratu scoring the goals. That victory helped CFR Cluj advance to the first position and become champions after the final round of the season. Dănciulescu was the top-scorer of that season with 21 goals.

In August 2009 after scoring a double against Ceahlăul Piatra Neamț, he became the fourth overall scorer in the history of the Romanian First Division with 187 goals, only behind Dudu Georgescu, Rodion Cămătaru and Marin Radu. Dănciulescu helped the club achieve what was dubbed "The wonder from Liberec" by winning the away game 3–0 against Slovan Liberec to force a penalty shoot-out after losing the first leg by the same score, ultimately qualifying for the 2009–10 Europa League group stage. However, shortly afterwards he left Dinamo to go play for Hércules Alicante in Segunda División as he was not getting along with coach Dario Bonetti. His last game was a 1–0 away victory against Steaua after which he was applauded by the 10,000 people who were at the stadium, including Steaua's fans.

=== Shandong Luneng ===
In 2005, Dinamo loaned him out to Chinese side Shandong Luneng for $500,000, who paid Dănciulescu a salary of $350,000 for 11 months. He worked with coach Ljubiša Tumbaković, scoring 10 goals in 26 league games which helped the team finish the championship in third place, and also they reached the Chinese FA Cup final where he played the entire match in the 1–0 loss to Dalian Shide. During the same period, the team managed to reach the AFC Champions League quarter-finals with him netting a brace in a 4–1 win over BEC Tero in the group stage.

=== Hércules ===
In August 2009, Dănciulescu signed a two-year contract with Spanish side Hércules Alicante in the Segunda División which paid Dinamo around €400,000, as he was wanted there by his former coach from The Red Dogs, Esteban Vigo. Dănciulescu scored 10 goals in 25 league games which helped Hércules earn the second place at the end of the championship, thus promoting to La Liga after a 13 year-break. He also scored two goals in the Spanish Cup against SD Huesca and Almería.

=== Third spell at Dinamo București ===
After only one year with Hércules, his contract was terminated, so Dănciulescu came back to Dinamo in July 2010, where he reunited with coach Ioan Andone. On 26 September 2011, he scored his 198th goal in Liga I in a match against Petrolul Ploiești, thus joining Rodion Cămătaru as the competition's second most prolific scorer. About three weeks later, he netted his 200th goal, during a win over Ceahlăul. He helped the team win the 2011–12 Cupa României, with coach Dario Bonetti using him as a starter until the 71st minute when Cătălin Munteanu replaced him in the 1–0 victory in the final against Rapid București. On 16 March 2013, after playing in a match against Petrolul, Dănciulescu became the first footballer that reached 500 appearances in the Romanian top-league.

Dănciulescu made his last Liga I appearance on 6 October 2013, exactly 20 years after he made his debut, playing for Dinamo in a 1–1 draw against Ceahlăul. He held the record for the most matches played in the competition—515 appearances—until Dan Nistor broke it in August 2026. In those matches, Dănciulescu scored 214 goals, making him the second-best scorer behind Dudu Georgescu, who netted 252. He also scored 35 goals in the Cupa României, holds the record of 36 appearances in the Dinamo – Steaua derby, during which he scored 13 goals—eight for Steaua and five for Dinamo—that tie him with Florea Voinea as the fixture's joint top-scorer.

== International career ==
Between 1994 and 2004, Dănciulescu made several appearances for Romania's under-18, under-21 and B teams. During his time with the under-21 side, he was part of the team that managed a first-ever qualification to a European Championship in 1998, which Romania subsequently hosted. In the final tournament that was composed of eight teams, coach Victor Pițurcă used him in all three games which were losses to Netherlands, Germany and Russia, as they finished in last place.

Dănciulescu played eight games and scored two goals for Romania, making his debut on 3 March 1999 under coach Pițurcă in a 2–0 friendly win against Estonia. However, he was not in Pițurcă's plans, and was never called up by him again due to a dispute they had when they worked at Steaua. During 2004 and 2009, Dănciulescu played seven games, including three in the 2006 and 2010 World Cup qualifiers, being called up by Anghel Iordănescu and Răzvan Lucescu.

His best match for the national team was a friendly against Germany that ended with a 5–1 victory when he scored a brace against goalkeeper Oliver Kahn.

== Managerial career ==
On 13 November 2014, following Flavius Stoican's departure from Dinamo București, the club's officials appointed Dănciulescu to lead the team in the remaining four games until the end of the first half of the season. After a 6–1 loss to Astra Giurgiu, he announced that he was not interested in continuing to coach the team. However, he stayed for the final game of the year when the team reached the Cupa Ligii semi-finals after eliminating Universitatea Cluj at the penalty shoot-out.

== Personal life ==
In 2025, Dănciulescu was named Honorary Citizen of Slatina.

== Career statistics ==
=== Club ===
Appearances and goals by club, season and competition
Club	Season	League			Cup		Continental		Other		Total	
Club	Season	Division	Apps	Goals	Apps	Goals	Apps	Goals	Apps	Goals	Apps	Goals
Electroputere Craiova	1993–94	Divizia A	4	1	1	1	1 (Note: Appearance in the 1994 Intertoto Cup)	0	–		6	2
Electroputere Craiova	1994–95	Divizia A	27	7	1	1	–		–		28	8
Electroputere Craiova	Total		31	8	2	2	1	0	–		34	10
Dinamo București	1995–96	Divizia A	32	14	0	0	2 (Note: Appearances in the UEFA Cup)	0	–		34	14
Dinamo București	1996–97	Divizia A	32	8	2	2	4 (Note: Appearances in the 1996 Intertoto Cup)	0	–		38	10
Dinamo București	Total		64	22	2	2	6	0	–		72	24
Altay	1997–98	1.Lig	7	1	0	0	–		–		7	1
Steaua București	1997–98	Divizia A	25	14	3	1	0	0	–		28	15
Steaua București	1998–99	Divizia A	33	15	7	6	5 (Note: Four appearances with two goals scored in the UEFA Champions League and one appearance in the UEFA Cup)	2	0	0	45	23
Steaua București	1999–2000	Divizia A	30	14	2	1	7	1	1 (Note: Appearance in the Supercupa României)	0	40	16
Steaua București	2000–01	Divizia A	27	6	3	3	–		–		30	9
Steaua București	2001–02	Divizia A	14	5	1	1	5 (Note: Three appearances in the UEFA Champions League and two appearances in the UEFA Cup)	0	0	0	20	6
Steaua București	Total		129	54	16	12	17	3	1	0	163	69
Dinamo București	2001–02	Divizia A	13	3	4	1	0	0	–		17	4
Dinamo București	2002–03	Divizia A	26	16	5	2	2 (Note: Appearances in the UEFA Champions League)	0	1	0	33	18
Dinamo București	2003–04	Divizia A	29	21	5	6	6	5	1	0	40	32
Dinamo București	2004–05	Divizia A	15	11	4	2	6 (Note: Four appearances with two goals scored in the UEFA Champions League and two appearances with one goal scored in the UEFA Cup)	3	–		25	16
Dinamo București	2005–06	Divizia A	14	2	0	0	–		–		14	2
Dinamo București	2006–07	Liga I	31	15	2	1	12	5	–		45	21
Dinamo București	2007–08	Liga I	32	21	2	0	4 (Note: Two appearances with one goal scored in the UEFA Champions League and two appearances with one goal scored in the UEFA Cup)	2	1	1	39	24
Dinamo București	2008–09	Liga I	34	12	4	2	2	0	–		40	14
Dinamo București	2009–10	Liga I	4	2	0	0	2 (Note: Appearances in the UEFA Europa League)	0	–		6	2
Dinamo București	Total		198	103	26	14	34	16	3	1	261	134
Shandong Luneng (loan)	2005	Chinese Super League	26	10	7	3	6 (Note: Appearances in the AFC Champions League)	2	4 (Note: Appearances in the Chinese Super League Cup)	0	43	15
Hércules	2009–10	Segunda División	25	10	3	2	–		–		28	12
Dinamo București	2010–11	Liga I	29	7	5	3	–		–		34	10
Dinamo București	2011–12	Liga I	32	13	4	1	4	1	–		40	15
Dinamo București	2012–13	Liga I	27	7	1	0	1	0	0	0	29	7
Dinamo București	2013–14	Liga I	5	0	1	1	–		–		6	1
Dinamo București	Total		93	27	11	5	5	1	–		109	33
Career total			574	236	67	40	69	21	8	1	718	298

=== International ===
Appearances and goals by national team and year
National team	Year	Apps	Goals
Romania	1999	1	0
Romania	2004	5	2
Romania	2009	2	0
Total		8	2

Scores and results list Romania's goal tally first, score column indicates score after each Dănciulescu goal.

List of international goals scored by Ionel Dănciulescu
No.	Date	Venue	Opponent	Score	Result	Competition
1	28 April 2004	Stadionul Giulești-Valentin Stănescu, Bucharest, Romania	Germany	3–0	5–1	Friendly
2	28 April 2004	Stadionul Giulești-Valentin Stănescu, Bucharest, Romania	Germany	4–0	5–1	Friendly

== Honours ==
Steaua București

- Divizia A: 1997–98, 2000–01
- Cupa României: 1998–99
- Supercupa României: 1998

Dinamo București

- Liga I: 2001–02, 2003–04, 2006–07
- Cupa României: 2002–03, 2003–04, 2011–12
- Supercupa României: 2012

Shandong Luneng

- Chinese FA Cup runner-up: 2005

Individual

- Liga I top-scorer: 2003–04, 2007–08
- Gazeta Sporturilor Romanian Footballer of the Year: 2004
