= 2006–07 Cupa României =

Tournament details
- Country: Romania
- Teams: 24

Final positions
- Champions: Rapid București
- Runners-up: Politehnica Timișoara

The 2006–07 Cupa României was the 69th season of the annual Romanian football knockout tournament.

The winners of the competition qualified for the First round of the 2007–08 UEFA Cup.

== Round of 32 ==
The matches were played on 24 and 25 October 2006.

Team 1	Score	Team 2
Farul Constanţa	4–1	Gloria Buzău
Unirea Urziceni	2–1 (a.e.t.)	CS Juventus București
Pandurii Târgu Jiu	0–0 (a.e.t.) (4–3 p)	Jiul Petroşani
Naţional București	2–1	FCM Bacău
Someşul Satu Mare	0–4	CFR Cluj
Unirea Alba Iulia	0–0 (a.e.t.) (4–2 p)	FC Vaslui
Dinamo București	3–1	Farul II Constanţa
Forex Braşov	0–3	Steaua București
CSM Râmnicu Vâlcea	0–4	Rapid București
Corvinul Hunedoara	1–5 (a.e.t.)	Oţelul Galaţi
Gloria Bistriţa	1–1 (a.e.t.) (3–5 p)	FC Caracal
Politehnica II Timișoara	1–3	Politehnica Timișoara
UTA Arad	4–1 (a.e.t.)	CS Otopeni
Argeş Piteşti	1–0	FCM Bacău II
Politehnica Iaşi	2–1	Universitatea Cluj
Ceahlăul Piatra Neamţ	1–2	FC U Craiova

== Round of 16 ==
The matches were played on 7, 8 and 9 November 2006.

Team 1	Score	Team 2
Naţional București	3–2 (a.e.t.)	FC Caracal
UTA Arad	0–2	Argeş Piteşti
Politehnica Iaşi	1–0	Farul Constanţa
Pandurii Târgu Jiu	1–0 (a.e.t.)	Dinamo București
Politehnica Timișoara	2–0	CFR 1907 Cluj
Unirea Urziceni	1–2	Oţelul Galaţi
Rapid București	1–0	FC U Craiova
Steaua București	2–1	Unirea Alba Iulia

== Quarter-finals ==
The matches were played on February 28 and March 1, 2007.

Team 1	Score	Team 2
Pandurii Târgu Jiu	3–2 (a.e.t.)	Naţional București
Politehnica Timișoara	2–1	Politehnica Iaşi
Rapid București	2–0 (a.e.t.)	Argeş Piteşti
Steaua București	3–3 (a.e.t.) (5–4 p)	Oţelul Galaţi

== Semi-finals ==
The matches were played on April 18 and 19, 2007.

Team 1	Score	Team 2
Politehnica Timișoara	1–0	Steaua București
Pandurii Târgu Jiu	0–2	Rapid București

== Final ==
26 May 2007
20:45 EEST

Politehnica Timișoara	0–2	Rapid București
	Report	Buga 15'; Zicu 48'

Stadionul Dan Păltinișanu, Timișoara
Attendance: 40,000
Referee: Augustus Constantin (Romania)
