= 2006–07 Liga I =

89th season of top-tier football league in Romania

Liga I
- Season: 2006–07
- Champions: Dinamo București
- Relegated: Argeș Pitești; Național București; Jiul Petroșani
- Champions League: Dinamo București; Steaua București
- UEFA Cup: CFR Cluj; Rapid București
- Intertoto Cup: Oțelul Galați; Gloria Bistrița
- Matches: 306
- Goals: 706 (2.31 per match)
- Top goalscorer: Claudiu Niculescu (18)
- Biggest home win: Steaua 6–0 Naţional
- Biggest away win: Oțelul 0–7 Rapid
- Highest scoring: Ceahlăul 4–3 Oțelul; Vaslui 2–5 UTA; Oțelul 5–2 Național; Oțelul 0–7 Rapid
- Longest winning run: Dinamo (13)
- Longest unbeaten run: Dinamo (17)
- Longest winless run: Jiul (12)
- Longest losing run: Argeș (11)

The 2006–07 Liga I (known as the Liga I Bürger for sponsorship reasons) was the eighty-ninth season of Liga I, the top-level football league of Romania. Season began on 28 July 2006 and ended on 23 May 2007.

== Teams ==
Eighteen teams played in the 2006–07 season. Four teams were from Moldova, four clubs from Transylvania, one from Dobruja and nine from Wallachia four of them coming from the country's capital city Bucharest.

Pandurii Târgu Jiu had been relegated at the end of the previous season but they re-entered Liga I at the expense of Sportul Studenţesc which has been relegated to Liga II due to financial problems. They relegated together with FC Bacău, who finished 16th last season. The other four new teams which gained access to Liga I were Ceahlăul Piatra Neamţ and Universitatea Craiova (both winning two of the three series of Liga II), plus Unirea Urziceni (winning the playoff for Liga I) and UTA Arad which bought the place from Liberty Salonta (winner of the third series of Liga II).

=== Venues ===
| Politehnica Timișoara | Steaua București | FC U Craiova | Ceahlăul Piatra Neamț |
|---|---|---|---|
| Dan Păltinișanu | Steaua | Ion Oblemenco | Ceahlăul |
| Capacity: 32,972 | Capacity: 28,365 | Capacity: 25,252 | Capacity: 17,500 |
| Farul Constanța | Jiul Petroșani | Dinamo București | Argeș Pitești |
| Farul | Jiul | Dinamo | Nicolae Dobrin |
| Capacity: 15,520 | Capacity: 15,500 | Capacity: 15,032 | Capacity: 15,000 |
| Național București | 2006–07 Liga I (Romania) Location of Bucharest teams. | | Oțelul Galați |
| Cotroceni | 2006–07 Liga I (Romania) Location of Bucharest teams. | | Oțelul |
| Capacity: 14,542 | 2006–07 Liga I (Romania) Location of Bucharest teams. | | Capacity: 13,500 |
| Rapid București | 2006–07 Liga I (Romania) Location of Bucharest teams. | | Politehnica Iași |
| Giulești-Valentin Stănescu | 2006–07 Liga I (Romania) Location of Bucharest teams. | | Emil Alexandrescu |
| Capacity: 11,704 (Note: Capacity of Giulești-Valentin Stănescu Stadium has been reduced from 19,100 to 11,704 due to advanced degradation of the resistance structure of the South End.) | 2006–07 Liga I (Romania) Location of Bucharest teams. | | Capacity: 11,390 |
| CFR Cluj (Note: CFR Cluj was relocated to Unirea Stadium from Dej for the first five home matches of this season because CFR Stadium was under renovations.) | 2006–07 Liga I (Romania) Location of Bucharest teams. | | FC Vaslui |
| CFR | 2006–07 Liga I (Romania) Location of Bucharest teams. | | Municipal |
| Capacity: 10,000 | 2006–07 Liga I (Romania) Location of Bucharest teams. | | Capacity: 9,240 |
| Pandurii Târgu Jiu | Gloria Bistrița | UTA Arad | Unirea Urziceni |
| Tudor Vladimirescu | Gloria | Francisc von Neuman | Tineretului |
| Capacity: 9,200 | Capacity: 7,800 | Capacity: 7,287 | Capacity: 7,000 |

=== Personnel and kits ===
| Team | Head coach | Captain | Kit manufacturer | Shirt Sponsor |
|---|---|---|---|---|
| Argeș Pitești | (Romania) Constantin Cârstea | (Romania) Alin Chița | Lotto | Pic |
| Ceahlăul Piatra Neamț | (Romania) Aurel Șunda | (Romania) Adrian Iencsi | Lotto | Altex |
| CFR Cluj | (Italy) Cristiano Bergodi | (Romania) Vasile Jula | Erreà | DOMO Group, Polus Center |
| Dinamo București | (Romania) Mircea Rednic | (Romania) Claudiu Niculescu | Nike | Omniasig |
| Farul Constanța | (Romania) Marin Ion | (Romania) Mihai Guriță | Lotto | SNC |
| FC U Craiova | (Romania) Florin Cioroianu | (Romania) Dorel Stoica | Erreà | Golden Brau |
| Gloria Bistrița | (Romania) Ioan Sabău | (Romania) Sandu Negrean | Nike | Darimex, Aldis |
| Jiul Petroșani | (Romania) Gheorghe Poenaru | (Romania) Ciprian Dinu | Nike | Atomis |
| Național București | (Romania) Eugen Nae | (Romania) Ovidiu Herea | Nike | Intercons |
| Oțelul Galați | (Romania) Petre Grigoraș | (Romania) Viorel Tănase | Nike | Mittal Steel |
| Pandurii Târgu Jiu | (Romania) Eugen Neagoe | (Romania) Florin Stângă | Lotto | USMO |
| Politehnica Iași | (Romania) Ionuț Popa | (Romania) Bogdan Onuț | Umbro | Iulius Mall |
| Politehnica Timișoara | (Romania) Valentin Velcea | (Romania) Dan Alexa | Lotto | Balkan Petroleum |
| Rapid București | (Romania) Răzvan Lucescu | (Romania) Vasile Maftei | Lotto | Lukoil |
| Steaua București | (Romania) Cosmin Olăroiu | (Romania) Mirel Rădoi | Nike | RAFO |
| Unirea Urziceni | (Romania) Dan Petrescu | (Romania) Bogdan Mara | Umbro | — |
| UTA Arad | (Romania) Marius Lăcătuș | (Romania) Daniel Tudor | Erreà | Intesa Sanpaolo |
| Vaslui | (Romania) Viorel Hizo | (Romania) Bogdan Buhuș | Umbro | — |

== League table ==
| Pos | Team | Pld | W | D | L | GF | GA | GD | Pts | Qualification or relegation |
|---|---|---|---|---|---|---|---|---|---|---|
| 1 | Dinamo București (C) | 34 | 23 | 8 | 3 | 63 | 24 | +39 | 77 | Qualification to Champions League third qualifying round |
| 2 | Steaua București | 34 | 21 | 8 | 5 | 61 | 22 | +39 | 71 | Qualification to Champions League second qualifying round |
| 3 | CFR Cluj | 34 | 21 | 6 | 7 | 59 | 32 | +27 | 69 | Qualification to UEFA Cup second qualifying round |
| 4 | Rapid București | 34 | 16 | 11 | 7 | 63 | 39 | +24 | 59 | Qualification to UEFA Cup first round |
| 5 | Oțelul Galați | 34 | 17 | 5 | 12 | 60 | 56 | +4 | 56 | Qualification to Intertoto Cup second round |
| 6 | Gloria Bistrița | 34 | 16 | 6 | 12 | 42 | 35 | +7 | 54 | Qualification to Intertoto Cup first round |
| 7 | Politehnica Timișoara | 34 | 15 | 8 | 11 | 37 | 33 | +4 | 53 | |
| 8 | Vaslui | 34 | 13 | 11 | 10 | 41 | 44 | −3 | 50 | |
| 9 | FC U Craiova | 34 | 12 | 12 | 10 | 39 | 43 | −4 | 48 | |
| 10 | Unirea Urziceni | 34 | 13 | 8 | 13 | 30 | 29 | +1 | 47 | |
| 11 | Pandurii Târgu Jiu | 34 | 13 | 5 | 16 | 26 | 35 | −9 | 44 | |
| 12 | UTA Arad | 34 | 11 | 8 | 15 | 28 | 39 | −11 | 41 | |
| 13 | Politehnica Iași | 34 | 10 | 10 | 14 | 34 | 41 | −7 | 40 | |
| 14 | Farul Constanța | 34 | 8 | 13 | 13 | 31 | 35 | −4 | 37 | |
| 15 | Ceahlăul Piatra Neamț | 34 | 8 | 7 | 19 | 27 | 53 | −26 | 31 | Spared from relegation (Note: Delta Tulcea, the winner of the Liga II, Seria I, was denied the right to participate in next season of Liga I because it failed to meet the licensing requirements, therefore Ceahlăul Piatra Neamţ was spared from relegation.) |
| 16 | Național București (R) | 34 | 6 | 6 | 22 | 27 | 52 | −25 | 24 (Note: Argeș Pitești 0-3 Național București; Național București 0-2 Argeș Pitești.) | Relegation to Liga II |
| 17 | Argeș Pitești (R) | 34 | 5 | 9 | 20 | 23 | 47 | −24 | 24 | Relegation to Liga II |
| 18 | Jiul Petroşani (R) | 34 | 5 | 5 | 24 | 15 | 47 | −32 | 20 | Relegation to Liga II |

Source: LT (in Romanian)
Rules for classification: 1) points; 2) head-to-head points; 3) head-to-head goal difference; 4) head-to-head goals scored; 5) goal difference; 6) number of goals scored.
(C) Champions; (R) Relegated

=== Positions by round ===
| Team ╲ Round | 1 | 2 | 3 | 4 | 5 | 6 | 7 | 8 | 9 | 10 | 11 | 12 | 13 | 14 | 15 | 16 | 17 | 18 | 19 | 20 | 21 | 22 | 23 | 24 | 25 | 26 | 27 | 28 | 29 | 30 | 31 | 32 | 33 | 34 |
|---|---|---|---|---|---|---|---|---|---|---|---|---|---|---|---|---|---|---|---|---|---|---|---|---|---|---|---|---|---|---|---|---|---|---|
| Argeș Pitești | 4 | 11 | 14 | 16 | 18 | 17 | 18 | 18 | 18 | 18 | 18 | 18 | 18 | 18 | 16 | 16 | 16 | 16 | 16 | 16 | 16 | 16 | 16 | 16 | 16 | 16 | 16 | 16 | 16 | 16 | 16 | 16 | 16 | 17 |
| Ceahlăul Piatra Neamț | 5 | 10 | 13 | 15 | 10 | 9 | 11 | 10 | 10 | 11 | 12 | 11 | 11 | 12 | 14 | 15 | 15 | 15 | 15 | 15 | 15 | 15 | 15 | 15 | 15 | 15 | 15 | 15 | 15 | 15 | 15 | 15 | 15 | 15 |
| CFR Cluj | 1 | 1 | 1 | 1 | 1 | 3 | 3 | 2 | 3 | 4 | 4 | 4 | 4 | 4 | 4 | 4 | 4 | 4 | 4 | 4 | 4 | 3 | 2 | 2 | 2 | 2 | 2 | 2 | 2 | 2 | 3 | 3 | 3 | 3 |
| Dinamo București | 3 | 3 | 2 | 2 | 2 | 1 | 1 | 1 | 1 | 1 | 1 | 1 | 1 | 1 | 1 | 1 | 1 | 1 | 1 | 1 | 1 | 1 | 1 | 1 | 1 | 1 | 1 | 1 | 1 | 1 | 1 | 1 | 1 | 1 |
| Farul Constanța | 6 | 6 | 4 | 5 | 7 | 12 | 9 | 11 | 12 | 9 | 10 | 12 | 13 | 13 | 11 | 13 | 13 | 14 | 14 | 13 | 12 | 11 | 12 | 12 | 12 | 12 | 14 | 13 | 13 | 14 | 14 | 14 | 14 | 14 |
| FC U Craiova | 10 | 14 | 10 | 10 | 12 | 14 | 15 | 15 | 16 | 14 | 14 | 14 | 12 | 10 | 12 | 8 | 11 | 11 | 11 | 11 | 11 | 10 | 14 | 13 | 14 | 14 | 13 | 12 | 12 | 12 | 11 | 10 | 10 | 9 |
| Gloria Bistrița | 15 | 9 | 11 | 11 | 14 | 11 | 7 | 6 | 8 | 6 | 8 | 8 | 8 | 7 | 6 | 6 | 6 | 5 | 6 | 5 | 5 | 5 | 5 | 5 | 5 | 5 | 5 | 5 | 5 | 6 | 6 | 6 | 7 | 6 |
| Jiul Petroşani | 16 | 15 | 17 | 17 | 13 | 13 | 16 | 16 | 15 | 16 | 17 | 17 | 17 | 17 | 18 | 18 | 18 | 17 | 17 | 17 | 17 | 18 | 18 | 18 | 18 | 18 | 18 | 18 | 18 | 18 | 18 | 17 | 18 | 18 |
| Național București | 14 | 16 | 12 | 14 | 17 | 18 | 14 | 13 | 14 | 15 | 15 | 15 | 16 | 16 | 17 | 17 | 17 | 18 | 18 | 18 | 18 | 17 | 17 | 17 | 17 | 17 | 17 | 17 | 17 | 17 | 17 | 18 | 17 | 16 |
| Oțelul Galați | 17 | 17 | 18 | 13 | 9 | 7 | 5 | 4 | 4 | 3 | 3 | 3 | 3 | 5 | 7 | 7 | 7 | 7 | 8 | 7 | 8 | 8 | 8 | 6 | 8 | 6 | 7 | 7 | 7 | 7 | 7 | 7 | 5 | 5 |
| Pandurii Târgu Jiu | 7 | 12 | 9 | 12 | 15 | 15 | 13 | 14 | 13 | 13 | 11 | 10 | 10 | 8 | 9 | 9 | 10 | 10 | 12 | 12 | 10 | 13 | 10 | 11 | 11 | 11 | 10 | 9 | 9 | 9 | 10 | 11 | 12 | 11 |
| Politehnica Iași | 2 | 2 | 5 | 4 | 5 | 4 | 6 | 5 | 7 | 7 | 6 | 6 | 7 | 9 | 10 | 12 | 12 | 13 | 10 | 10 | 13 | 9 | 9 | 9 | 10 | 10 | 11 | 10 | 11 | 10 | 12 | 12 | 13 | 13 |
| Politehnica Timișoara | 12 | 7 | 6 | 9 | 6 | 8 | 4 | 8 | 6 | 5 | 7 | 7 | 6 | 6 | 5 | 5 | 5 | 6 | 5 | 6 | 6 | 6 | 6 | 8 | 7 | 8 | 6 | 6 | 6 | 5 | 5 | 5 | 6 | 7 |
| Rapid București | 8 | 8 | 7 | 7 | 8 | 6 | 8 | 7 | 5 | 8 | 5 | 5 | 5 | 3 | 3 | 3 | 3 | 3 | 3 | 3 | 3 | 2 | 4 | 4 | 4 | 3 | 4 | 4 | 4 | 4 | 4 | 4 | 4 | 4 |
| Steaua București | 11 | 5 | 3 | 3 | 3 | 2 | 2 | 3 | 2 | 2 | 2 | 2 | 2 | 2 | 2 | 2 | 2 | 2 | 2 | 2 | 2 | 4 | 3 | 3 | 3 | 4 | 3 | 3 | 3 | 3 | 2 | 2 | 2 | 2 |
| Unirea Urziceni | 18 | 18 | 15 | 8 | 11 | 10 | 12 | 9 | 11 | 12 | 13 | 13 | 14 | 14 | 15 | 14 | 14 | 12 | 13 | 14 | 14 | 14 | 11 | 10 | 9 | 9 | 9 | 8 | 8 | 8 | 8 | 9 | 9 | 10 |
| UTA Arad | 9 | 4 | 8 | 6 | 4 | 5 | 10 | 12 | 9 | 10 | 9 | 9 | 9 | 11 | 8 | 11 | 9 | 9 | 9 | 9 | 9 | 12 | 13 | 14 | 13 | 13 | 12 | 14 | 14 | 13 | 13 | 13 | 11 | 12 |
| Vaslui | 13 | 13 | 16 | 18 | 16 | 16 | 17 | 17 | 17 | 17 | 16 | 16 | 15 | 15 | 13 | 10 | 8 | 8 | 7 | 8 | 7 | 7 | 7 | 7 | 6 | 7 | 8 | 11 | 10 | 11 | 9 | 8 | 8 | 8 |

Source: LT (in Romanian)

=== Results ===
| Home \ Away | ARG | CEA | CFR | DIN | FAR | FCU | GLO | JIU | OȚE | NAȚ | PAN | PIS | PTM | RAP | STE | URZ | UTA | VAS |
|---|---|---|---|---|---|---|---|---|---|---|---|---|---|---|---|---|---|---|
| Argeș Pitești | — | 1–0 | 0–0 | 2–3 | 0–1 | 0–0 | 2–0 | 0–1 | 0–3 | 3–1 | 0–0 | 0–2 | 0–2 | 1–2 | 0–1 | 1–1 | 0–1 | 1–1 |
| Ceahlăul Piatra Neamț | 1–1 | — | 1–3 | 2–2 | 0–0 | 0–2 | 1–0 | 1–0 | 1–1 | 4–3 | 1–0 | 0–4 | 1–2 | 0–3 | 0–0 | 2–1 | 2–1 | 3–2 |
| CFR Cluj | 2–0 | 1–1 | — | 2–1 | 1–0 | 5–1 | 2–1 | 1–1 | 1–0 | 2–1 | 1–0 | 2–1 | 2–1 | 3–2 | 1–2 | 4–0 | 5–0 | 2–2 |
| Dinamo București | 2–1 | 2–0 | 1–0 | — | 2–1 | 0–0 | 2–0 | 1–0 | 1–0 | 3–0 | 1–0 | 5–0 | 3–1 | 3–1 | 1–0 | 1–2 | 2–0 | 0–0 |
| Farul Constanța | 1–1 | 0–1 | 0–2 | 1–1 | — | 0–0 | 0–0 | 0–0 | 1–1 | 3–1 | 2–0 | 3–0 | 1–3 | 1–2 | 1–1 | 0–1 | 0–0 | 1–1 |
| FC U Craiova | 3–1 | 1–0 | 0–1 | 0–4 | 1–0 | — | 1–2 | 2–0 | 1–0 | 0–2 | 2–2 | 3–3 | 0–1 | 0–0 | 0–0 | 0–0 | 2–1 | 0–0 |
| Gloria Bistrița | 3–1 | 2–1 | 3–2 | 0–1 | 3–2 | 4–1 | — | 0–0 | 2–0 | 1–2 | 2–0 | 1–0 | 1–1 | 3–3 | 2–0 | 0–0 | 1–0 | 3–0 |
| Jiul Petroșani | 0–1 | 0–0 | 0–2 | 0–1 | 1–2 | 1–2 | 0–1 | — | 1–2 | 2–0 | 0–2 | 3–1 | 0–1 | 1–0 | 0–2 | 0–1 | 2–0 | 1–3 |
| Național București | 0–2 | 2–0 | 0–1 | 1–2 | 2–0 | 1–2 | 1–0 | 0–0 | — | 1–3 | 0–1 | 2–1 | 0–2 | 4–0 | 0–3 | 0–2 | 1–2 | 0–1 |
| Oțelul Galați | 5–1 | 3–1 | 1–3 | 2–1 | 0–0 | 4–1 | 1–1 | 2–1 | 5–2 | — | 2–0 | 3–1 | 1–0 | 0–7 | 2–1 | 3–2 | 2–1 | 2–0 |
| Pandurii Târgu Jiu | 2–1 | 1–0 | 1–3 | 0–3 | 1–0 | 0–2 | 2–0 | 2–0 | 2–1 | 2–1 | — | 1–0 | 1–0 | 1–1 | 0–0 | 1–0 | 2–0 | 1–2 |
| Politehnica Iași | 1–0 | 1–0 | 0–1 | 1–1 | 0–2 | 1–1 | 0–1 | 4–0 | 1–1 | 1–1 | 2–1 | — | 0–0 | 0–0 | 1–1 | 1–3 | 1–0 | 2–0 |
| Politehnica Timișoara | 3–1 | 2–0 | 3–1 | 1–1 | 1–1 | 1–5 | 1–0 | 1–0 | 1–1 | 1–0 | 1–0 | 0–1 | — | 0–0 | 0–0 | 1–0 | 2–0 | 2–2 |
| Rapid București | 2–1 | 4–1 | 3–1 | 1–4 | 3–2 | 1–1 | 4–0 | 1–0 | 2–1 | 3–3 | 1–1 | 3–0 | 2–0 | — | 2–3 | 1–0 | 4–0 | 2–0 |
| Steaua București | 2–0 | 2–0 | 4–2 | 2–4 | 3–0 | 3–0 | 2–1 | 3–0 | 6–0 | 3–0 | 1–0 | 1–0 | 3–1 | 1–1 | — | 3–0 | 0–0 | 3–1 |
| Unirea Urziceni | 0–0 | 2–0 | 0–0 | 1–1 | 0–1 | 1–2 | 0–1 | 3–0 | 2–0 | 1–0 | 1–0 | 0–2 | 2–0 | 1–1 | 1–2 | — | 1–0 | 1–0 |
| UTA Arad | 0–0 | 1–0 | 1–0 | 1–1 | 1–1 | 1–0 | 0–1 | 3–0 | 1–1 | 1–1 | 3–0 | 0–0 | 2–1 | 1–0 | 0–3 | 1–0 | — | 0–1 |
| Vaslui | 1–0 | 3–2 | 0–0 | 1–2 | 1–3 | 3–3 | 3–2 | 2–0 | 1–0 | 3–1 | 1–0 | 1–1 | 1–0 | 1–1 | 1–0 | 0–0 | 2–5 | — |

Source: LT (in Romanian)
Legend: Blue = home team win; Yellow = draw; Red = away team win.

== Top goalscorers ==
| Rank | Player | Club | Goals |
|---|---|---|---|
| 1 | (Romania) Claudiu Niculescu | Dinamo București | 18 |
| 2 | (Romania) Ionel Ganea | Rapid București / Dinamo București | 16 |
| 3 | (Romania) Ionel Dănciulescu | Dinamo București | 15 |
| 4 | (Romania) Emil Jula | Oțelul Galați | 14 |
| 5 | (Romania) Valentin Badea | Steaua București | 13 |
| 6 | (Romania) Ianis Zicu | Rapid București | 12 |
| 7 | (Romania) Daniel Stan | Oțelul Galați | 11 |
| 7 | (Romania) Cristian Coroian | CFR Cluj | 11 |
| 7 | (Romania) Dorel Zaharia | Gloria Bistrița | 11 |
| 10 | (Romania) Nicolae Dică | Steaua București | 10 |
| 10 | (France) Cyril Théréau | Steaua București | 10 |
| 10 | (Moldova) Viorel Frunză | CFR Cluj / Vaslui | 10 |
| 10 | (Romania) Romeo Surdu | CFR Cluj | 10 |

== Champion squad ==
Dinamo București

Goalkeepers: Uladzimir Hayew (Belarus) (11 / 0); Bogdan Lobonț (14 / 0); Florin Matache (7 / 0); Glen Moss (New Zealand) (1 / 0); Deniss Romanovs (Latvia) (1 / 0).
Defenders: George Blay (Ghana) (31 / 0); Silviu Bălace (9 / 0); Eugen Crăciun (1 / 0); George Galamaz (1 / 0); Lucian Goian (7 / 0); Sergiu Homei (1 / 0); Dorin Mihuț (5 / 0); Cosmin Moți (29 / 1); Nicolae Mușat (2 / 0); Cosmin Pașcovici (4 / 0); Cristian Pulhac (32 / 0); Ștefan Radu (32 / 1); Adrian Scarlatache (6 / 0); Māris Smirnovs (Latvia) (1 / 0).
Midfielders: Adrian Cristea (28 / 3); Fabrice Fernandes (France) (5 / 0); Leo Lerinc (Serbia) (1 / 0); Andrei Mărgăritescu (31 / 1); Cătălin Munteanu (32 / 4); Andrei Nițu (2 / 0); Cornel Predescu (8 / 0); Adrian Ropotan (21 / 0); Sreten Stanić (Serbia) (1 / 0); Dennis Șerban (7 / 2); Iulian Tameș (15 / 0); Vojislav Vranjković (Bosnia and Herzegovina) (9 / 0); Zé Kalanga (Angola) (21 / 2).
Forwards: Ionel Dănciulescu (31 / 15); Ionel Ganea (18 / 14); Liviu Ganea (9 / 2); Valentin Lemnaru (1 / 0); Jean-Philippe Mendy (France) (9 / 0); Claudiu Niculescu (31 / 18).
(league appearances and goals listed in brackets)

Manager: Mircea Rednic.

== Attendances ==
| # | Club | Average |
|---|---|---|
| 1 | Politehnica Timișoara | 11,912 |
| 2 | Steaua București | 10,206 |
| 3 | U Craiova | 7,165 |
| 4 | Politehnica Iași | 7,147 |
| 5 | Dinamo 1948 | 7,088 |
| 6 | Vaslui | 5,665 |
| 7 | CFR Cluj | 5,588 |
| 8 | Oțelul Galați | 5,588 |
| 9 | UTA Arad | 5,529 |
| 10 | Pandurii Târgu Jiu | 5,424 |
| 11 | Unirea Urziceni | 4,676 |
| 12 | Ceahlăul Piatra Neamț | 4,647 |
| 13 | Rapid București | 3,971 |
| 14 | Argeș Pitești | 3,553 |
| 15 | Farul Constanța | 3,026 |
| 16 | Gloria Bistrița | 2,562 |
| 17 | Jiul Petroșani | 2,106 |
| 18 | Național București | 1,662 |
