= Cristian Munteanu =

Romanian footballer (born 1974)

Personal information
- Full name: Cristian Marian Munteanu
- Date of birth: 10 November 1974 (age 52)
- Place of birth: Isaccea, Romania
- Height: 1.81 m (5 ft 11 1/2 in)
- Position: Goalkeeper

Team information
- Current team: Oțelul Galați (president)

Youth career
- Progresul Isaccea
- –1992: Luceafărul București

Senior career*
Years	Team	Apps	(Gls)
1986	Progresul Isaccea	2	(0)
1992–1997	Farul Constanța	100	(0)
1997	Dinamo București	2	(0)
1998–1999	Național București	48	(0)
2000–2002	Oțelul Galați	67	(0)
2002–2006	Dinamo București	49	(0)
2003	→ Național București (loan)	11	(0)
2005	→ Național București (loan)	14	(0)
2005	→ AEK Larnaca (loan)	7	(0)
2006–2008	Progresul București	14	(0)
2008–2009	Otopeni	25	(0)
2009–2010	Dinamo București	5	(0)
2009	→ Astra Ploiești (loan)	10	(0)
Total		354	(0)

International career
1992–1993	Romania U18	8	(0)
1992–1995	Romania U21	17	(0)

Managerial career
- 2012: Farul Constanța (vice-president)
- 2020–2024: Oțelul Galați (general manager)
- 2024–: Oțelul Galați (president)
- * Club domestic league appearances and goals

Cristian Marian Munteanu (born 10 November 1974) is a former Romanian football player who played as a goalkeeper, currently president at Liga I club Oțelul Galați.

== Club career ==
=== Progresul Isaccea ===
Munteanu, nicknamed Babicu, was born on 10 November 1974 in Isaccea, Romania and began playing football at local club Progresul. When he was 11 years old, as Progresul's goalkeepers left the club to do their military service, he made his senior debut in a Divizia C match that ended with a 7–0 loss to Chimia Brăila. Afterwards he played one more senior league game, then he continued his junior career, at one point moving to Luceafărul București.

=== Farul Constanța ===
Munteanu went to Farul Constanța where he made his Divizia A debut shortly after he turned 18, on 22 November 1992 under coach Florin Marin in a 5–0 away loss to Oțelul Galați. He played five games in the 1995 Intertoto Cup as The Sailors got past the group stage, being eliminated in the round of 16 by Heerenveen. During his five seasons spent at Farul he had a period in which he did not concede any goals for 569 consecutive minutes.

=== Dinamo, Național and Oțelul ===
In 1997 he went to play for his childhood favorite team, Dinamo București where he made only two league appearances, as Florin Prunea was the first-choice goalkeeper. In the middle of the 1997–98 season he went to play for Național București. He participated with The Bankers in the 1998 Intertoto Cup, playing five matches as they got past Hapoel Haifa and Iraklis in the first two rounds, being eliminated in the third by Bologna on the away goals rule. In the middle of the 1999–2000 season, Munteanu joined Oțelul Galați. During his two and a half seasons spent with The Steelworkers, he was very appreciated by the fans, being considered one of the best goalkeepers in the history of the club.

=== Dinamo and loans ===
In 2002, Munteanu returned to Dinamo where he played in both legs of the 4–1 aggregate loss to Club Brugge in the 2002–03 Champions League second qualifying round. The team also won the 2002–03 Cupa României, but coach Ioan Andone preferred to use Daniel Tudor in the 1–0 win over Național in the final. In the first half of the following season he was loaned to Național. Munteanu returned for the second half to Dinamo, helping them win The Double, coach Andone using him in nine league games, and he also kept a clean sheet in the 2–0 win over Oțelul in the Cupa României final. Afterwards he made three appearances in the 2004–05 Champions League qualifying rounds, keeping a clean sheet in the 2–0 aggregate win over Žilina but received a red card in the second leg, then in the following round they were eliminated by Manchester United. In the middle of the season he was loaned once again to Național. In 2005, Munteanu had his only experience outside Romania, as he was loaned by Dinamo to AEK Larnaca, where he was a teammate with compatriot Narcis Răducan and played seven games in the Cypriot First Division. He returned to Dinamo after half a year where he played for the rest of the season.

=== Național and Otopeni ===
In 2006, Munteanu returned to Național which was relegated at the end of the season. He stayed with the club that changed its name to Progresul for one more season in the second league.

In the 2008–09 season he played for Otopeni and was again relegated.

=== Dinamo and Astra ===
In July 2009, Munteanu was signed once again by Dinamo which needed a goalkeeper after Bogdan Lobonț suffered an injury. He was loaned to Astra Ploiești for the 2009–10 season, but left after the first half when coach Nicolò Napoli removed him from the squad. He returned to Dinamo for the second half of the season, making his last appearance in the Romanian first league on 22 May 2010 in a 2–0 away loss to FC Vaslui, totaling 338 matches in the competition.

== International career ==
Munteanu played for Romania's under-18 squad under the guidance of coach Gheorghe Staicu, including three games in the 1993 European Under-18 Championship. He started playing for the nation's under-21 team while he was 17 years old.

During his career, Munteanu was called to Romania's senior team by coaches Anghel Iordănescu and Gheorghe Hagi, but eventually did not play in any games.

== After retirement ==
After he ended his career, Munteanu had several businesses in various domains. In 2012 he was appointed as vice-president at Farul Constanța, a position he held for a few months. In 2020 he went to work for Oțelul Galați as a general manager, then in 2024 he became the club's president.

== Personal life ==
Munteanu's father, Vasile, played for Progresul Isaccea in Divizia C. He had four uncles and two cousins who also played for Isaccea. His cousin, George Curcă, was also a goalkeeper and they were colleagues in 2010 at Dinamo București.

== Honours ==
Dinamo București

- Divizia A: 2003–04
- Cupa României: 2002–03, 2003–04
- Supercupa României runner-up: 2002, 2003
