= Vojislav Vranjković =

Serbian footballer

Personal information
- Date of birth: 1 January 1983 (age 43)
- Place of birth: Knin, SR Croatia, SFR Yugoslavia
- Height: 1.83 m (6 ft 0 in)
- Position: Midfielder

Senior career*
Years	Team	Apps	(Gls)
1998–2000	Srem		
2000–2002	Obilić	0	(0)
2003	Glasinac Sokolac	15	(0)
2003–2004	Drina Zvornik		
2004–2005	Rudar Ugljevik	20	(2)
2005	Obilić	8	(1)
2006	Pandurii Târgu-Jiu	28	(5)
2007–2010	Dinamo București	20	(0)
2007–2008	→ Ceahlăul (loan)	15	(1)
2010–2011	Pandurii Târgu Jiu	3	(0)
2011–2012	Sloboda Užice	20	(0)
2012	Čelik Nikšić	3	(0)
2013	Turnu Severin	13	(2)
2013	Corona Brașov	12	(0)
Total		157	(11)
- * Club domestic league appearances and goals as of 4 March 2019

Vojislav Vranjković (Serbian Cyrillic: Војислав Врањковић; born 1 January 1983) is a Serbian retired footballer who played as a midfielder.

He played in Serbia, Bosnia and Herzegovina, Romania and Montenegro.

== Honours ==
Dinamo București

- Liga I: 2006–07
