= Augustin Chiriță =

Romanian footballer

Personal information
- Full name: Augustin Edward Chiriță
- Date of birth: 10 October 1975 (age 51)
- Place of birth: Slatina, Romania
- Height: 1.72 m (5 ft 8 in)
- Position: Midfielder

Youth career
- 1993–1995: Drobeta-Turnu Severin

Senior career*
Years	Team	Apps	(Gls)
1995–1996	Grivița București		
1996–1998	Minerul Motru	63	(4)
1998–1999	FC U Craiova	13	(0)
1999–2003	Argeș Pitești	116	(8)
2003–2004	Karpaty Lviv	21	(0)
2003	→ Karpaty-2 Lviv	4	(0)
2004–2005	Spartak Ivano-Frankivsk	26	(7)
2005–2007	Argeș Pitești	18	(0)
2006	→ Hapoel Be'er Sheva (loan)		
2007	Alprom Slatina		
2007	FC Junkersdorf	14	(2)
2008	Inter Gaz București	16	(1)
2008–2011	Victoria Brănești	39	(1)
2012	Olt Slatina	9	(3)
2012	Girom Albota		(2)
2013	Atletic Bradu		
Total		325+	(21+)

Managerial career
- 2008–2011: Victoria Brănești (player and assistant)
- 2012: Olt Slatina (player and assistant)
- 2012: Girom Albota (player and assistant)
- 2013: Atletic Bradu (player and assistant)
- 2013–2014: Ordabasy- (assistant)
- 2014–2017: Bunyodkor (fitness coach)
- 2017–2019: Kyran (fitness coach)
- 2018: National team of Uzbekistan (fitness coach)
- 2018–2019: Sogdiana Jizzakh (fitness coach)
- 2020: Bukhara (fitness coach)
- 2021: Navbahor Namangan (fitness coach)
- 2022: Bunyodkor Tashkent (fitness coach)
- 2023: Turon (fitness coach)
- 2023: FC Qizilqum Zarafshon (fitness coach)
- * Club domestic league appearances and goals

Augustin Eduard Chiriță (born 10 October 1975) is a Romanian former footballer who played as a midfielder for teams such as Minerul Motru, Argeș Pitești, Karpaty Lviv or Spartak Ivano-Frankivsk, among others. After retirement, Chiriță started his football manager career and was the assistant manager of Victoria Brănești, Olt Slatina and Ordabasy-2, among others. Since 2014, he was the fitness coach of Bunyodkor and Kyran.
