= Claudiu Drăgan =

Romanian footballer

Personal information
- Date of birth: 18 March 1979 (age 47)
- Place of birth: Chișineu-Criș, Romania
- Height: 1.76 m (5 ft 9 in)
- Position: Striker

Team information
- Current team: UTA Arad (director of competitions)

Youth career
- 1987–1995: Crișul Chișineu-Criș
- 1985–1996: AS Romvest Arad

Senior career*
Years	Team	Apps	(Gls)
1996–1997	Rapid București	2	(0)
1997–1999	UTA Arad	60	(21)
2000–2004	Dinamo București	84	(13)
2004	Dinamo II București	13	(11)
2003	→ Argeș Pitești (loan)	6	(0)
2005	Universitatea Craiova	12	(1)
2005–2006	Jiul Petroșani	23	(3)
2006–2008	Progresul București	30	(7)
2008–2010	Baia Mare		
2010–2011	UTA Arad	20	(2)
2012	Békéscsaba	11	(2)
2012–2014	Gyulai Termál	49	(20)
Total		310	(80)

International career
2000–2002	Romania U21	20	(1)
- * Club domestic league appearances and goals

Claudiu Drăgan (born 18 March 1979) is a Romanian former professional footballer who played as a striker.

== Honours ==
=== Player ===
Dinamo București

- Divizia A: 1999–2000, 2001–02, 2003–04
- Cupa României: 1999–2000, 2000–01, 2002–03, 2003–04
- Supercupa României: runner-up 2001, runner-up 2002, runner-up 2003

FC Baia Mare

- Liga III: 2008–09
