= Uladzimir Hayew =

Belarusian footballer (born 1977)

Personal information
- Date of birth: 28 October 1977 (age 49)
- Place of birth: Mozyr, Soviet Union
- Height: 1.88 m (6 ft 2 in)
- Position: Goalkeeper

Team information
- Current team: Slutsk (goalkeeper coach)

Youth career
- MPKC Mozyr

Senior career*
Years	Team	Apps	(Gls)
1996–2002	Slavia Mozyr	95	(0)
2001	→ Zvezda-VA-BGU Minsk (loan)	10	(0)
2003	Gomel	15	(0)
2003–2006	Dinamo București	38	(0)
2007	Chornomorets Odesa	2	(0)
2008	Shakhtyor Soligorsk	7	(0)
2008	→ Savit Mogilev (loan)	15	(0)
2009–2010	Gomel	49	(0)
2011–2015	Slavia Mozyr	115	(0)
Total		357	(0)

International career
1996–1999	Belarus U21	15	(0)
2006–2007	Belarus	4	(0)

Managerial career
- 2016–2017: Slavia Mozyr (gk coach)
- 2017–: Slutsk (gk coach)
- * Club domestic league appearances and goals

Uladzimir Hayew (Belarusian: Уладзімір Гаеў, Russian: Владимир Гаев; born 28 October 1977), also known as Vladimir Gaev, is a Belarusian association football coach and former player (goalkeeper).

== Career ==
=== Club ===
Hayew began his playing career with the home-town team MPKC, (which later changed its name to FC Slavia Mozyr), in the Belarusian Premier League. Playing first in the youth team, before making his senior team debut in 1996, the year they won their first championship. In 2000, he won the league championship with Slavia. After a brief loan spell at Zvyazda Minsk, he played his last season for Slavia in 2002, moving another Belarus club, Gomel. His only season there brought another championship medal, in 2003. That success brought the attention of the top Romanian club, Dinamo București, who signed him to a three-year deal in 2003. His first game for Dinamo came in the second half of the 2003/2004 season, in a game against Farul Constanţa on 24 April 2004; a game Dinamo won 2–1. That season he played only 2 games, but enough to earn a Championship medal. Gaev went on to play for 3 more seasons in Romania, winning the Romanian Cup in 2004 and 2005, as well as the Romanian Super Cup in 2005. He has also played in 11 European cup matches for Dinamo. In 2007, he was transferred to Chornomorets. After making only 2 senior team appearances for them, Gaev was sold to the Belarusian Premier League club Shakhtyor Soligorsk in the beginning of 2008. In the summer of 2008 he was loaned to another Premier League club, Savit Mogilev for the remainder of the season. During that 2008 season Hayew played 15 matches (allowing 26 goals), and the team was relegated after finishing in 15th place. The club folded and Gaev moved to FC Gomel for the 2009 season.

=== International career ===
Uladzimir Hayew has played for the Belarus national football team on 4 occasions. The most recent of which was a UEFA Euro 2008 qualifying game against Slovenia on 12 September 2007. He was recalled to the team, after a long absence, by the new head coach of Belarus, Bernd Stange.

=== Honors ===
Slavia Mozyr

- Belarusian Premier League champion: 1996, 2000
- Belarusian Cup winner: 1995–96, 1999–2000

Gomel

- Belarusian Premier League champion: 2003
- Belarusian Cup winner: 2010–11

Dinamo București

- Liga I champion: 2003–04, 2006–07
- Cupa României winner: 2003–04, 2004–05
- Supercupa României winner: 2005
