= Ioan Andone =

Romanian football coach and player

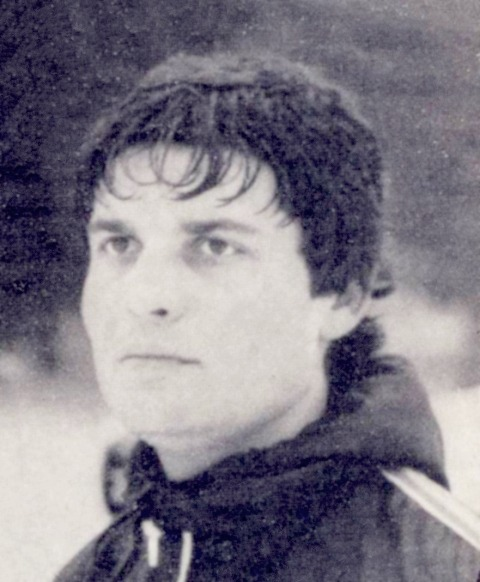
- Andone during the late 1980s

Personal information
- Date of birth: 15 March 1960 (age 66)
- Place of birth: Șpălnaca, Romania
- Height: 1.85 m (6 ft 1 in)
- Position: Centre-back

Team information
- Current team: Corvinul Hunedoara (board member)

Youth career
- 1972–1975: Școala Sportivă Hunedoara
- 1975–1979: Corvinul Hunedoara

Senior career*
| Years | Team | Apps | (Gls) |
| 1979–1983 | Corvinul Hunedoara | 105 | (15) |
| 1983–1990 | Dinamo București | 171 | (22) |
| 1990–1991 | Elche | 34 | (3) |
| 1991–1993 | Heerenveen | 39 | (4) |
| Total | | 349 | (44) |

International career
| 1981 | Romania U20 | 5 | (0) |
| 1981–1990 | Romania | 55 | (2) |

Managerial career
- 1993: Dinamo București (assistant)
- 1993–1994: Sportul Studențesc
- 1994–1995: Universitatea Cluj
- 1996: Sportul Studențesc
- 1996–1997: Petrolul Ploiești
- 1997–1998: Farul Constanța
- 1999–2000: FC Brașov
- 2000: Sportul Studențesc
- 2000–2001: Bihor Oradea
- 2001–2003: Sportul Studențesc
- 2003–2005: Dinamo București
- 2005–2007: Omonia Nicosia
- 2007–2008: CFR Cluj
- 2009: Al-Ettifaq
- 2009: Al-Ahli
- 2010: CSKA Sofia
- 2010: Rapid București
- 2010–2011: Dinamo București
- 2012: CFR Cluj
- 2013: Astana
- 2014: Al-Ettifaq
- 2014–2015: Apollon Limassol
- 2015: Aktobe
- 2016–2017: Dinamo București
- 2018–2020: Voluntari (general manager)
- 2020–2021: Voluntari (president)
- 2021–: Corvinul Hunedoara (board member)
Medal record
Representing Romania
FIFA World Youth Championship
| Bronze medal – third place | FIFA U-20 World Cup | 1981 Australia |
- * Club domestic league appearances and goals

Ioan Andone (Romanian pronunciation: [iˈo̯an anˈdone]; born 15 March 1960) is a Romanian professional football coach and former player.

== Club career ==
=== Corvinul Hunedoara ===
Andone, nicknamed "Fălcosul", was born on 15 March 1960 in Șpălnaca, Romania, and at 14 years old, he simultaneously played basketball and football, with Carol Gal as his first football coach at Școala Sportivă Hunedoara. At 16, he decided to concentrate exclusively on his football career when he went to Corvinul Hunedoara's youth center where he was coached by Dumitru Pătrașcu. On 7 March 1979, Andone made his Divizia A debut for Corvinul when coach Mircea Lucescu sent him to replace Radu Nunweiller in the last 20 minutes of a 2–0 away loss to Sportul Studențesc București. At the end of his first season at Corvinul, the club was relegated to Divizia B, but Andone stayed with the club, helping it get promoted back to the first division after one year. Afterwards, he helped the club finish third in the 1981–82 Divizia A. He also appeared in four games in the 1982–83 UEFA Cup as they got past Grazer AK in the first round, being eliminated in the following one by FK Sarajevo, with Andone scoring a goal against each of them.

=== Dinamo București ===
In the summer of 1983, Andone and teammate Mircea Rednic were transferred from Corvinul to Dinamo București in exchange for five players, including Nicușor Vlad, Teofil Stredie and Florea Văetuș. In his first season spent with The Red Dogs, he helped the club win The Double, coach Nicolae Dumitru using him in 24 league games in which he scored one goal and he played the entire match in the 2–1 victory over rivals Steaua București in the Cupa României final. Andone also appeared in six matches in the 1983–84 European Cup, as they eliminated title holders Hamburg in the campaign, reaching the semi-finals where they were defeated by Liverpool. He would reunite at Dinamo with his former coach from Corvinul, Mircea Lucescu. Their first achievement was the winning of the 1985–86 Cupa României where in the final he played the entire match, which ended with a 1–0 win against Steaua, who had recently won the European Cup.

He was in the center of a big scandal in the derby against Steaua in March 1989, which was lost 2–1 after Gheorghe Hagi opened the score, Andone equalized for Dinamo and Gabi Balint scored the winning goal for Steaua in the last minute of the game. Furthermore, referee Ion Crăciunescu eliminated Rodion Cămătaru and Claudiu Vaișcovici from Dinamo. Feeling disadvantaged by the referee, right after the game, Andone and Rednic showed some obscene gestures in front of the official tribune where Valentin Ceaușescu, the son of dictator Nicolae Ceaușescu and unofficial president of Steaua was staying. Initially, the Romanian Football Federation suspended Andone for one year, but after his friend from Steaua, Marius Lăcătuș, talked to Valentin Ceaușescu and convinced him to forgive Andone, his suspension was reduced to three months. Rednic also got away with it after a friend of his from Steaua, László Bölöni, talked to Valentin Ceaușescu.

Afterwards, Andone played five games and scored one goal against Kuusysi Lahti in the 1988–89 European Cup Winners' Cup, helping Dinamo reach the quarter-finals where they were eliminated on the away goals rule after 1–1 on aggregate by Sampdoria. In the following season, he won another Double with the club, Lucescu giving him 20 appearances in which he scored two goals in the league, and also played the full 90 minutes in the 6–4 win over Steaua in the Cupa României final. In the same season, he made another European performance by playing eight games in the 1989–90 European Cup Winners' Cup, before the team was eliminated in the semi-finals following a 2–0 aggregate loss to Anderlecht. On 9 May 1990, Andone made his last Divizia A appearance in Dinamo's 2–2 draw against FC Brașov, totaling 255 matches with 35 goals in the competition and 29 games with three goals in European competitions.

=== Elche ===
After the 1989 Romanian Revolution, Andone was bought for $125,000 by Spanish side Elche where he was colleagues with Santiago Cañizares. He played 34 matches in which he scored three goals in the 1990–91 Segunda División season.

=== Heerenveen ===
Andone spent the last two seasons of his career in the Netherlands, under head coach Fritz Korbach at Heerenveen where he was teammates with compatriot Rodion Cămătaru. He made 39 appearances and scored four goals in the Eerste Divisie.

== International career ==
Andone was selected by coach Constantin Cernăianu to be part of Romania's under-20 squad for the 1981 World Youth Championship held in Australia. He appeared in five games, helping the team finish the tournament in third position, winning the bronze medal.

Andone played 55 matches and scored two goals for Romania, making his debut on 11 November 1981 when coach Mircea Lucescu sent him in the 82nd minute to replace Aurel Țicleanu in a 0–0 draw against Switzerland in the 1982 World Cup qualifiers. He made five appearances in which he scored one goal in a 2–0 victory against Sweden in the successful Euro 1984 qualifiers. Then he was used by coach Lucescu in the 2–1 loss to West Germany in the final tournament as Romania did not get past the group stage. Andone played one game during the 1986 World Cup qualifiers and one in the Euro 1988 qualifiers. Afterwards he played four games in the successful 1990 World Cup qualifiers. Coach Emerich Jenei used him for the entirety of all four matches in the final tournament, as Romania was eliminated by Ireland in the round of 16. Andone's last game for the national team took place on 17 October 1990 in a 3–0 loss to Bulgaria in the Euro 1992 qualifiers.

For representing his country at the 1990 World Cup, Andone was decorated by President of Romania Traian Băsescu on 25 March 2008 with the Ordinul "Meritul Sportiv" – (The Medal "The Sportive Merit") class III.

== Managerial career ==
=== First trophies with Dinamo ===
Andone started his coaching career in 1993 at Sportul Studențesc, a club he would coach on three other occasions. He coached Universitatea Cluj, Petrolul Ploiești, Farul Constanța, FC Brașov and Bihor Oradea before arriving in March 2003 at Dinamo București. With The Red Dogs, Andone won the first trophies of his coaching career. The first one was the 2002–03 Cupa României, following a 1–0 victory against Național București in the final, courtesy of a goal scored by Iulian Tameș. Subsequently, he led the team to win The Double in the 2003–04 season by having the championship's best offence with 71 goals scored of which 37 were netted by the prolific "N&D" striking duo composed of Claudiu Niculescu and Ionel Dănciulescu. The Cupa României was won after a 2–1 win over Oțelul Galați in the final. Andone led the club to win another Cupa României in the 2004–05 season, after defeating Farul Constanța 1–0, thanks to a goal netted by Ștefan Grigorie. Subsequently, he helped Dinamo win its first Supercupa României in 2005 by earning a 3–2 victory against rivals Steaua București. At Dinamo, Andone also made his first European achievements, beginning with the elimination of Shakhtar Donetsk in the 2003–04 UEFA Cup. In the 2005–06 edition of the same competition, he guided them to eliminate Omonia Nicosia and Everton, managing a historical 5–2 win on aggregate against the latter, reaching the group stage. There, the campaign ended, but Dinamo still managed to earn a 1–0 victory against title holders CSKA Moscow.

=== Trophies with CFR Cluj ===
After he left Dinamo, Andone took over Cypriot club Omonia Nicosia in December 2005 and stayed there until January 2007, finishing in second place in the 2005–06 Cypriot First Division. Andone coached CFR Cluj in the 2007–08 season, helping the team win the title and the cup, which were the first trophies the club won in its history. In the Cupa României final, he guided CFR to a 2–1 win over Unirea Urziceni. However, he was dismissed in the beginning of the following season for poor results. He went to coach abroad, having spells in the Arab world at Al-Ettifaq and Al-Ahli, before returning to Europe at Bulgarian club CSKA Sofia where he worked with Romanian players Florentin Petre and Daniel Pancu. On 1 April 2010, Rapid București's officials appointed the former CSKA Sofia manager to lead the team until the end of the 2009–10 season, managing to earn a 5–1 home victory against rivals Steaua. For the 2010–11 season, Andone came back to Dinamo and during his tenure the club reached the 2011 Cupa României final which was lost 2–1 to Steaua. On 9 April 2012, he returned for a second spell at CFR Cluj, replacing Jorge Costa before the 26th round of the 2011–12 season, managing to win the title at the end of it. In the following season, he led CFR to eliminate Slovan Liberec and Basel in the 2012–13 Champions League qualifying rounds, reaching the group stage. There, after earning four points in three games against Manchester United, Galatasaray and Braga, Andone was dismissed.

Andone has a total of 456 matches as a manager in the Romanian top-division, Liga I, consisting of 207 victories, 80 draws and 169 losses.

=== Coaching abroad ===
In 2013, Andone went to coach abroad, first in the Kazakhstan Premier League with Astana where he finished the championship in second place. Subsequently, he had a second tenure at Al-Ettifaq where one of his players was compatriot Nicolae Grigore, but the spell was unsuccessful as the club was relegated from the Saudi Pro League. Then he worked in Cyprus at Apollon Limassol where he was dismissed despite being in first place in the 2014–15 Cypriot First Division. In 2015 he returned to Kazakhstan, coaching Aktobe with whom he finished the season in third place.

=== Late years ===
Andone was appointed head coach of Dinamo for a third time in May 2016, but was dismissed in February 2017. From June 2018 until July 2021, he worked at Voluntari, first as general manager and from July 2020 as president.

== Career statistics ==
=== International ===
Appearances and goals by national team and year
| National team | Year | Apps | Goals |
|---|---|---|---|
| Romania | 1981 | 1 | 0 |
| Romania | 1982 | 9 | 1 |
| Romania | 1983 | 9 | 0 |
| Romania | 1984 | 5 | 0 |
| Romania | 1985 | 0 | 0 |
| Romania | 1986 | 4 | 0 |
| Romania | 1987 | 3 | 0 |
| Romania | 1988 | 9 | 1 |
| Romania | 1989 | 4 | 0 |
| Romania | 1990 | 11 | 0 |
| Total | | 55 | 2 |

Scores and results list Romania's goal tally first, score column indicates score after each Andone goal.

| # | Date | Venue | Opponent | Score | Result | Competition |
|---|---|---|---|---|---|---|
| 1 | 8 September 1982 | Stadionul 23 August, Bucharest, Romania | Sweden | 1–0 | 2–0 | UEFA Euro 1984 qualifying |
| 2 | 30 March 1988 | Kurt-Wabbel-Stadion, Halle, East Germany | East Germany | 2–3 | 3–3 | Friendly |

== Honours ==
=== Player ===
Corvinul Hunedoara

- Divizia B: 1979–80

Dinamo București

- Divizia A: 1983–84, 1989–90
- Cupa României: 1983–84, 1985–86, 1989–90

Romania U20

- FIFA U-20 World Cup third-place: 1981

=== Manager ===
Dinamo București

- Divizia A: 2003–04
- Cupa României: 2002–03, 2003–04, 2004–05
- Supercupa României: 2005

CFR Cluj

- Liga I: 2007–08, 2011–12
- Cupa României: 2007–08
- Supercupa României runner-up: 2012

Shabab Al Ahli

- UAE Super Cup runner-up: 2009
