= Claudiu Niculescu =

Romanian football player and manager

Personal information
- Full name: Claudiu Iulian Niculescu
- Date of birth: 23 June 1976 (age 50)
- Place of birth: Slatina, Romania
- Height: 1.82 m (6 ft 0 in)
- Position: Striker

Youth career
- 1982–1994: CSȘ Slatina

Senior career*
Years	Team	Apps	(Gls)
1994–1995	Jiul IELIF Craiova	29	(5)
1995–1996	Drobeta-Turnu Severin	20	(15)
1996–1997	Electroputere Craiova	48	(31)
1998–2001	Universitatea Craiova	93	(41)
2001–2002	Dinamo București	30	(20)
2002–2003	Genoa	13	(3)
2003–2007	Dinamo București	123	(69)
2008	MSV Duisburg	17	(4)
2008	Omonia	8	(1)
2009–2010	Dinamo București	38	(8)
2010–2012	Universitatea Cluj	42	(18)
Total		461	(215)

International career
2000–2007	Romania	8	(0)

Managerial career
- 2010: Universitatea Cluj (caretaker)
- 2012: Universitatea Cluj (player/coach)
- 2012: Bihor Oradea
- 2013: Damila Măciuca
- 2013–2014: CSM Râmnicu Vâlcea
- 2014–2015: Mioveni
- 2017–2018: Voluntari
- 2018: Dinamo București
- 2019: Al-Tai
- 2020: Mioveni
- 2021–2022: Concordia Chiajna
- 2022: Politehnica Iași
- 2022–2024: 1599 Șelimbăr
- 2024: Voluntari
- 2024–2026: CSM Slatina
- 2026: Unirea Slobozia
- * Club domestic league appearances and goals

Claudiu Iulian Niculescu (born 23 June 1976) is a Romanian professional football coach and former striker.

== Club career ==
"Claudiu is one of the strikers with the highest qualities I have ever met."

— José Ramón Alexanko, former Universitatea Craiova manager

=== Early career ===
Niculescu was born on 23 June 1976 in Slatina, Romania. He began playing junior-level football in his hometown at CSȘ Slatina, alongside Ionel Dănciulescu, Ionuț Luțu and Augustin Chiriță, being coached by Ion Pârvulescu. He started his senior career in 1994, playing for Jiul IELIF Craiova in Divizia B. Subsequently, he played for one season at Drobeta-Turnu Severin in Divizia C, returning for the following one and a half seasons to play in Divizia B for Electroputere Craiova.

=== Universitatea Craiova ===
Niculescu made his Divizia A debut on 1 March 1998, playing for Universitatea Craiova under coach José Ramón Alexanko in a 2–1 victory against Petrolul Ploiești in which he scored one goal. He spent three and a half years with The Blue Lions, scoring 41 goals in 93 league matches. Niculescu played in two Cupa României finals in 1998 and 2000 which were both lost to Rapid București and Dinamo București respectively. He also appeared in both legs of "U" Craiova's 2–1 aggregate loss to Pobeda in the 2000–01 UEFA Cup qualifying round.

=== Dinamo București and Genoa ===
In 2001, Niculescu went to play for Dinamo București where in his first season he won the Divizia A title, being the second top-scorer of the league with 15 goals, as coaches Cornel Dinu and Marin Ion gave him 28 appearances. In 2002, shortly after beating goalkeeper Iker Casillas with a spectacular 30-meter shot in a 5–2 friendly loss to Real Madrid, Niculescu was transferred to Genoa in Serie B for a fee estimated by the Romanian press between €700,000 and €1 million. He spent one year with The Griffin alongside compatriots Adrian Mihalcea and Paul Codrea, but injuries limited him to just 13 appearances and three goals. He returned to Dinamo who agreed to pay the Genovese team €800,000 to get him back.

=== Second spell at Dinamo ===
In the first season, following his return to The Red Dogs, Niculescu helped them win The Double, contributing with 16 goals in 28 league matches under coach Ioan Andone and netted the second goal of the 2–0 win over Oțelul Galați in the Cupa României final. In the same season, he gave his contribution to the elimination of Shakhtar Donetsk by scoring a goal in each leg of the 5–2 victory on aggregate in the UEFA Cup. On 21 November 2004, Niculescu was in the center of a controversy when during an away game against his former team, Universitatea Craiova, a fan entered the field, threw a "U" Craiova scarf into Claudiu Niculescu's face, and screamed:"You are a stinking traitor!". Shortly after, his teammate Adrian Mihalcea tackled the fan to the ground. In the 2004–05 season he scored 21 goals, including all the goals in a 4–0 victory against CFR Cluj, sharing the Divizia A top-scorer title with Gheorghe Bucur. He formed a successful partnership in Dinamo's offence with Ionel Dănciulescu, and the Romanian press called them the "N&D couple", a nickname inspired by the first letters of their family names and the Romanian pop band "N&D". Niculescu started the following season by scoring the final goal of the 3–2 victory against rivals Steaua București which helped the club earn its first Supercupa României. Subsequently, he played in the 2005–06 UEFA Cup where they eliminated Omonia against whom he scored a goal, then they got past Everton against whom he also netted a goal in a historical 5–2 aggregate win. The club reached the group stage, where he scored a goal against goalkeeper Fabien Barthez from a 20-meter free kick in a 2–1 away loss to Marseille, as the campaign ended.

In the 2006–07 season under coach Mircea Rednic, Niculescu won another championship title with Dinamo and became the top-scorer of the league with 18 goals, four of which were scored in a 4–1 win over rivals Rapid București and two in a 4–2 derby victory against Steaua. In the first half of that season, Niculescu, Dănciulescu, and Ionel Ganea were part of a rotation system imposed by Rednic, as they were all prolific strikers but only two could start in any given match. Niculescu scored eight goals in the 2006–07 UEFA Cup, being the second-highest scorer in the competition, having three fewer goals than Espanyol's Walter Pandiani. Four of these goals came in the group stage against Beşiktaş, Club Brugge, and a double in a 2–1 victory against Bayer Leverkusen that earned him a grade 10 in the Gazeta Sporturilor newspaper. His performance helped The Red Dogs reach the round of 32, where they were eliminated by Benfica. In the following season, Dinamo aimed to reach the Champions League group stage, with Niculescu playing in both legs of the third qualifying round against Lazio Roma, which was lost with 4–2 on aggregate.

=== MSV Duisburg and Omonia ===
In January 2008, Niculescu was transferred from Dinamo to MSV Duisburg for €700,000, where he was wanted by coach Rudi Bommer and became teammates with fellow Romanians Mihai Tararache and Iulian Filipescu. He made his Bundesliga debut on 2 February, providing an assist for Tobias Willi in a 3–3 draw against Borussia Dortmund. He played 15 league matches in which he scored four goals against VfL Wolfsburg, VfB Stuttgart, VfL Bochum and Eintracht Frankfurt. At the end of the season he was transferred to Omonia in Cyprus for €200,000.

=== Dinamo and Universitatea Cluj ===
In 2009 he returned for a third spell at Dinamo which lasted one and a half years. During this period, Niculescu helped the club achieve what was dubbed "The wonder from Liberec" by winning the away game 3–0 against Slovan Liberec to force a penalty shoot-out after losing the first leg by the same score, ultimately qualifying for the 2009–10 Europa League group stage. With 43 games and 18 goals scored for Dinamo in European matches, Niculescu is the player with the most appearances and top scorer in European competitions for the club.

In the summer of 2010 he joined Universitatea Cluj. The highlights of this period were a brace in a 4–3 victory over his former team, Dinamo, then another goal against them in a 2–1 win, and he also scored a goal directly from a corner kick in a 1–1 draw against Astra Ploiești. He made his last Liga I appearance on 12 March 2012, playing for "U" Cluj in a 1–0 home loss to Steaua, totaling 326 matches with 156 goals in the competition. Niculescu was a striker skilled in free kicks, being nicknamed "Lunetistul" (The Sniper) by the Romanian press.

== International career ==
Niculescu played eight games for Romania, making his debut when coach László Bölöni sent him to replace Marius Niculae in the 81st minute of a 2–1 friendly victory against FR Yugoslavia. He also played two games in the 2006 World Cup qualifiers and one during the Euro 2008 qualifiers. Niculescu's last appearance for the national team took place on 22 August 2007 in a 2–0 home win in a friendly against Turkey.

== Managerial career ==
Niculescu's first coaching experience came in November 2010, when he served as a player-coach for two matches at Universitatea Cluj. His second coaching stint was in the same dual-role capacity at "U" Cluj in March 2012. Niculescu resigned on 23 July 2012, after the first game of the 2012–13 season, a 6–2 loss to Pandurii Târgu Jiu.

On 25 September 2012, Niculescu was installed as the head coach of Liga II team Bihor Oradea with the objective of earning promotion to the first division. In December, he ended his contract, after only eight games (two wins, three draws and three losses). From 2013 to 2015, he continued to work for teams in the second league such as Damila Măciuca, CSM Râmnicu Vâlcea and Mioveni. In April 2017, Niculescu was appointed coach of Liga I team Voluntari. He helped them win the 2016–17 Cupa României, by defeating Astra Giurgiu at the penalty shoot-out in the final. Subsequently, he led them to win another trophy, the 2017 Supercupa României, after a 1–0 victory against Viitorul Constanța. He left Voluntari in April 2018.

In September 2018, Niculescu was appointed coach of Dinamo București, following the dismissal of Florin Bratu. However, on 13 October, he was dismissed and replaced by Mircea Rednic. In the summer of 2019, he took over Saudi second tier club Al-Tai, but left in October, following three consecutive losses. In the following years, Niculescu worked for several clubs in the Romanian second league, including a second spell at Mioveni, then going to Concordia Chiajna, Politehnica Iași, 1599 Șelimbăr, a comeback to Voluntari and coaching his hometown club CSM Slatina.

Niculescu returned to Liga I football in February 2026, signing with Unirea Slobozia. However, after failing to save the team from relegation, he resigned in May 2026.

== Personal life ==
Niculescu's father, Marin, was a football coach in the Romanian lower leagues. His brothers Mihai and Dragoș and his cousin Ovidiu were footballers in the Romanian lower leagues. In 1998 he married Lidia and they had two kids together, Alexandru and Rebecca. They divorced in 2006. In June 2007, he married Diana Munteanu who was a TV host, and their wedding was considered the wedding of the year by the Romanian press. Together they had a son named David Cristian. He and Diana divorced in 2014.

Niculescu was ranked 83rd in the 2006 nationwide poll of the 100 Greatest Romanians. In 2025, he was named Honorary Citizen of Slatina.

== Career statistics ==
=== Club ===
Appearances and goals by club, season and competition
Club	Season	Division	League		National cup		Europe		Supercup		Total	
Club	Season	Division	Apps	Goals	Apps	Goals	Apps	Goals	Apps	Goals	Apps	Goals
Jiul IELIF Craiova	1994–95	Divizia B	29	5			–		–		29	5
Drobeta-Turnu Severin	1995–96	Divizia C	20	15			–		–		20	15
Electroputere Craiova	1996–97	Divizia B	33	24			–		–		33	24
Electroputere Craiova	1997–98	Divizia B	15	7			–		–		15	7
Electroputere Craiova	Total		48	31			–		–		48	31
Universitatea Craiova	1997–98	Divizia A	13	2	3	0	–		–		16	2
Universitatea Craiova	1998–99	Divizia A	28	9	0	0	–		–		28	9
Universitatea Craiova	1999–2000	Divizia A	26	16	5	1	–		–		31	17
Universitatea Craiova	2000–01	Divizia A	26	14	2	1	2 (Note: Appearances in the UEFA Cup)	0	–		30	15
Universitatea Craiova	Total		93	41	10	2	2	0	–		105	43
Dinamo București	2001–02	Divizia A	28	15	5	2	3	2	–		36	19
Dinamo București	2002–03	Divizia A	2	5	0	0	2 (Note: Appearances in the UEFA Champions League)	0	–		4	5
Dinamo București	Total		30	20	5	2	5	2	–		40	24
Genoa	2002–03	Serie B	13	3	0	0	–		–		13	3
Dinamo București	2003–04	Divizia A	28	16	6	4	6	2	1	0	41	22
Dinamo București	2004–05	Divizia A	28	21	7	4	6 (Note: Four appearances in the UEFA Champions League and two appearances in the UEFA Cup)	0	–		41	25
Dinamo București	2005–06	Divizia A	20	12	0	0	5	3	1	1	26	16
Dinamo București	2006–07	Liga I	31	18	1	0	10	10	–		42	28
Dinamo București	2007–08	Liga I	16	2	0	0	3 (Note: Two appearances in the UEFA Champions League and one appearance with one goal scored in the UEFA Cup)	1	1	1	20	4
Dinamo București	Total		123	69	14	8	30	16	3	2	170	95
MSV Duisburg	2007–08	Bundesliga	17	4	0	0	–		–		17	4
Omonia	2008–09	Cypriot First Division	8	1	0	0	2	0	–		10	1
Dinamo București	2008–09	Liga I	14	4	1	0	–		–		15	4
Dinamo București	2009–10	Liga I	24	4	5	2	8 (Note: Appearance in the UEFA Europa League)	0	–		37	6
Dinamo București	Total		38	8	6	2	8	0	–		52	10
Universitatea Cluj	2010–11	Liga I	26	13	0	0	–		–		26	13
Universitatea Cluj	2011–12	Liga I	16	5	0	0	–		–		16	5
Universitatea Cluj	Total		42	18	0	0	–		–		42	18
Career total			461	215	35	14	47	18	3	2	546	249

=== International ===
Appearances and goals by national team and year
National team	Year	Apps	Goals
Romania
Romania	2000	1	0
Romania	2002	2	0
Romania	2005	2	0
Romania	2006	2	0
Romania	2007	1	0
Total		8	0

== Managerial statistics ==
Updated as of 18 May 2026

Team	From	To	Record						
Team	From	To	G	W	D	L	GF	GA	Win %
Universitatea Cluj	9 November 2010	18 November 2010	2	0	1	1	1	4	0.00
Universitatea Cluj	5 March 2012	27 July 2012	15	4	6	5	23	23	26.67
Bihor Oradea	11 September 2012	13 December 2012	11	3	4	4	18	20	27.27
Damila Măciuca	10 January 2013	29 June 2013	12	8	2	2	22	7	66.67
CSM Râmnicu Vâlcea	5 August 2013	27 April 2014	25	10	7	8	29	23	40.00
Mioveni	7 July 2014	19 October 2015	45	22	11	12	64	40	48.89
Voluntari	3 April 2017	14 April 2018	47	16	13	18	48	57	34.04
Dinamo București	24 September 2018	13 October 2018	3	1	1	1	3	3	33.33
Al-Tai	15 June 2019	30 October 2019	11	5	1	5	13	11	45.45
Mioveni	2 March 2020	27 October 2020	17	5	7	5	11	10	29.41
Concordia Chiajna	8 January 2021	1 March 2022	31	16	9	6	35	22	51.61
Politehnica Iași	7 June 2022	10 October 2022	10	6	2	2	14	8	60.00
1599 Șelimbăr	7 November 2022	12 May 2024	43	20	13	10	52	41	46.51
Voluntari	6 June 2024	22 November 2024	14	6	4	4	17	11	42.86
CSM Slatina	2 December 2024	4 February 2026	33	14	8	11	45	36	42.42
Unirea Slobozia	5 February 2026	21 May 2026	14	3	4	7	14	20	21.43
Total			333	139	93	101	405	329	41.74

== Honours ==
=== Player ===
Universitatea Craiova

- Cupa României runner-up: 1997–98, 1999–2000

Dinamo București

- Divizia A: 2001–02, 2003–04, 2006–07
- Cupa României: 2002–03, 2003–04, 2004–05
- Supercupa României: 2005

=== Individual ===
- Liga I top scorer: 2004–05 (joint with Gigel Bucur), 2006–07

=== Manager ===
Voluntari

- Cupa României: 2016–17
- Supercupa României: 2017
