= 2002–03 Cupa României =

Tournament details
- Country: Romania

Final positions
- Champions: Dinamo București
- Runners-up: Naţional București

The 2002–03 Cupa României was the 65th edition of Romania's most prestigious football tournament.

Dinamo București won the title by defeating Naţional București 1–0.

== Format ==
Cupa României is an annual knockout tournament. The first round of matches are played on the grounds of the lower-ranked teams; in the second round the matches are played in a neutral location. If a match is tied after 90 minutes, the game goes into extra time. If the match is still tied, the result is decided by penalty kicks. In the quarterfinals and semifinals, the winner was determined by the combined score from two matches.

== Round of 32 ==
Team 1	Score	Team 2
6 November 2002
IS Câmpia Turzii (Div. B)	3–0	(Div. A) Oțelul Galați
CFR Cluj (Div. B)	1–0	(Div. A) Sportul Studențesc București
FC Oradea (Div. B)	1–1 (a.e.t.) (7–6 p)	(Div. A) Gloria Bistrița
Progresul Caracal (Div. C)	0–3	(Div. A) Naţional București
Petrolul Ploiești (Div. B)	0–1 (a.e.t.)	(Div. A) Steaua București
Midia Năvodari (Div. B)	3–2	(Div. A) FC U Craiova
Unirea Focșani (Div. B)	1–0	(Div. A) Politehnica AEK Timișoara
Politehnica Iași (Div. B)	2–1 (a.e.t.)	(Div. A) Ceahlăul Piatra Neamț
Laminorul Roman (Div. C)	0–3	(Div. A) Astra Ploieşti
Minerul Motru (Div. C)	2–2 (a.e.t.) (5–6 p)	(Div. A) FCM Bacău
CF Predeal (Div. C)	1–6	(Div. A) Farul Constanța
FC Baia Mare (Div. B)	0–1 (a.e.t.)	(Div. A) FC Brașov
CSM Reșița (Div. B)	1–3	(Div. A) Argeș Pitești
UM Timișoara (Div. B)	0–1	(Div. A) Dinamo București
Inter Gaz București (Div. B)	0–1 (a.e.t.)	(Div. A) UTA Arad
Electromagnetica București (Div. B)	1–5	(Div. A) Rapid București

== Round of 16 ==
Team 1	Score	Team 2
27 November 2002
Argeș Pitești	1–1 (a.e.t.) (3–1 p)	Rapid București
CFR Cluj	2–1 (a.e.t.)	FC Brașov
Naţional București	3–0	Midia Năvodari
Farul Constanța	2–1	FC Oradea
Unirea Focșani	0–1	Astra Ploieşti
Politehnica Iași	1–0 (a.e.t.)	UTA Arad
IS Câmpia Turzii	1–3	FCM Bacău
Steaua București	0–3	Dinamo București

== Quarterfinals ==
The matches were played on 12 March and 2 April 2003.

Team 1	Agg.	Team 2	1st leg	2nd leg
Naţional București	5–0	CFR Cluj	4–0	1–0
Politehnica Iași	1–3	Astra Ploieşti	1–2	0–1
Farul Constanța	2–3	Dinamo București	0–1	2–2
Argeș Pitești	5–1	FCM Bacău	5–1	0–0

== Semifinals ==
The matches were played on 23 April and 14 May 2003.

Team 1	Agg.	Team 2	1st leg	2nd leg
Naţional București	5–2	Argeș Pitești	4–0	1–2
Astra Ploieşti	3–4 (a.e.t.)	Dinamo București	2–1	1–3 (a.e.t.)

== Final ==
31 May 2003
20:00 EEST

Dinamo București	1–0	Naţional București
Tameş 30'	Report

Stadionul Naţional, Bucharest
Attendance: 25,000
Referee: Alain Sars (France)

Cupa României 2002–03 winners
Dinamo București
10th title
