= 2003–04 FC Oțelul Galați season =

FC Oțelul
2003–04 season
- Chairman: Nicu Boghici
- Manager: Costel Orac; Sorin Cârţu (from 29 December 2003)
- Divizia A: 5th
- Cupa României: Runners-up
- Top goalscorer: League: Iacob (6); All: Iacob (8); Guriță (3); Aldea (2); Apostol (2); Călin (2); Dobre (2); Ilie (2); Munteanu (2); Oprea (2)

Although at the end of the previous season they relegated, Oțelul managed to retain their spot in Divizia A after the merger of FC Astra Ploieşti and newly promoted Petrolul Ploieşti. After 15 rounds played in Divizia A, Costel Orac was fired in December and replaced with Sorin Cârţu.

== Competitions ==
=== Friendlies ===
23 July 2003	Juventus București	0–2	Oțelul Galați	Sfântu Gheorghe
10:30		(Report)	Vintilă; Emeric Vascko

26 July 2003	Oltul Sfântu Gheorghe	2–1	Oțelul Galați	Sfântu Gheorghe
11:00	?,	(Report)	Emeric Vascko

30 July 2003	Bnei Sakhnin (Israel)	0–0	(Romania) Oțelul Galați	Braşov
11:00		(Report)		Stadium: ICIM

2 August 2003	Oțelul Galați	1–1	CF Brăila	Galați
11:00	Oprea 58'	(Report)		Stadium: Oțelul; Attendance: 3,000

20 August 2003	Oțelul Galați	4–1	Dunărea Galați	Galați
	Danciu 3'; Iacob 6'; Guriţă 55'; Sandu Cernat 80'	(Report)	Lungu 72'	Stadium: Oțelul

6 February 2004 Turkey	Borac Banja Luka (Bosnia and Herzegovina)	0–2	(Romania) Oțelul Galați	Antalya
15:00		(Report)	Negru 42'; Nedelcev 51'

8 February 2004 Turkey	Taraz (Kazakhstan)	0–0	(Romania) Oțelul Galați	Antalya
		(Report)

10 February 2004 Turkey	Haladás (Hungary)	0–3	(Romania) Oțelul Galați	Antalya
14:00			?,,

12 February 2004 Turkey	Žilina (Slovakia)	1–0	(Romania) Oțelul Galați	Antalya
	Barčík 38'	(Report)

14 February 2004 Turkey	Samsung Bluewings (South Korea)	1–2	(Romania) Oțelul Galați	Antalya
	Marcel 11'	(Report)	Ilie 6'; Oprea 14'

17 February 2004 Turkey	Daegu (South Korea)	0–2	(Romania) Oțelul Galați	Antalya
		(Report)	Oprea 21', 43'

27 February 2004	Dunărea Galați	0–1	Oțelul Galați	Galați
14:00		(Report)	Ilie 80'	Stadium: Dunărea

4 March 2004	Junkers Galați	2–7	Oțelul Galați	Galați
14:00	Mogoş 3' (pen.), 55'; Popa (red card) 77'	(Report)	Călin 28', 44'; Ilie 40' (pen.) 52', 62', 87'; Izvoranu 84'	Stadium: Universitaţii

=== Liga 1 ===
==== League table ====
Pos	Team	Pld	W	D	L	GF	GA	GD	Pts	Qualification or relegation
3	Rapid București	30	16	7	7	51	32	+19	55	
4	Universitatea Craiova	30	11	11	8	38	34	+4	44	
5	Oțelul Galați	30	10	13	7	30	26	+4	43	Qualification to UEFA Cup first qualifying round
6	Apulum Alba Iulia	30	11	8	11	32	47	−15	41	
7	Național București	30	11	6	13	36	39	−3	39 (Note: TIM 0-0 PRO; PRO 0-0 TIM)	

Source: LT (in Romanian)
Rules for classification: 1) points; 2) head-to-head points; 3) head-to-head goal difference; 4) head-to-head goals scored; 5) goal difference; 6) number of goals scored.

==== Results by round ====
Round	1	2	3	4	5	6	7	8	9	10	11	12	13	14	15	16	17	18	19	20	21	22	23	24	25	26	27	28	29	30
Ground	H	A	H	A	H	A	H	A	H	A	H	A	H	H	A	A	H	A	H	A	H	A	H	A	H	A	H	A	A	H
Result	L	D	W	L	D	W	W	L	D	D	W	L	D	W	L	D	W	W	L	L	D	D	W	D	D	D	D	W	W	D
Position	12	14	6	13	14	8	5	8	7	7	5	6	6	5	6	8	5	5	6	8	8	8	8	8	8	8	7	5	5	5

Source: Matches
A = Away; H = Home; W = Win; D = Draw; L = Loss

==== Results summary ====
Overall								Home						Away					
Pld	W	D	L	GF	GA	GD	Pts	W	D	L	GF	GA	GD	W	D	L	GF	GA	GD
30	10	13	7	30	26	+4	43	6	7	2	20	12	+8	4	6	5	10	14	−4

==== Matches ====
9 August 2003 Matchday 1	Oțelul Galați	0–1	Universitatea Craiova	Galați
18:00	Danciu (yellow card) 6'; Dragomir (yellow card) 25'	(Report)	N'Jock 4'; Rada (yellow card) 35'; Bundea (yellow card) 45'; Moţi (yellow card) 82'; Gušo (yellow card) 90+1'	Stadium: Oțelul; Attendance: 8,000; Referee: Alexandru Tudor

16 August 2003 Matchday 2	Farul Constanţa	1–1	Oțelul Galați	Constanţa
20:00	Lungu (yellow card) 15'; Bălaşa 48'; Onuţ (yellow card) 77'	(Report)	Iacob (yellow card) 15'; Oprea (yellow card) 28'; Danciu (yellow card) 37'; Guriţă 43'; Mărginean (yellow card) 45'	Stadium: Farul; Attendance: 3,000; Referee: Ionică Serea

23 August 2003 Matchday 3	Oțelul Galați	2–1	FC Brașov	Galați
18:00	Iacob 12', (yellow card) 45'; Mărginean 64', (yellow card) 73'; Oprea (yellow card) 67'; Sandu Cernat (yellow card) 82'	(Report)	Csaba Balint (yellow card) 26'; Mozacu (yellow card) 30'; Buga 71'	Stadium: Oțelul; Attendance: 8,000; Referee: Cristian Balaj

30 August 2003 Matchday 4	Rapid București	2–0	Oțelul Galați	Bucharest
20:00	Bratu 42', 56'; Iencsi (yellow card) 50'	(Report)	Rohat (yellow card) 15'; Iacob (yellow card) 54'; Apostol (yellow card) 73'	Stadium: Lia Manoliu; Attendance: 3,000; Referee: Marian Salomir

13 September 2003 Matchday 5	Oțelul Galați	0–0	Dinamo București	Galați
16:00	Danciu (yellow card) 1'; Guriţă (yellow card) 79'; Cernea (yellow card) 90+2'	(Report)	Alexa (yellow card) 2'; Burcă (yellow card) 67'	Stadium: Oțelul; Attendance: 6,000; Referee: Anton Heleşteanu

20 September 2003 Matchday 6	Petrolul Ploieşti	0–1	Oțelul Galați	Ploieşti
19:30	Negoiţă (yellow card) 20'; Crăciun (yellow card) 52'; Georgel Ciprian Toporan (yellow card) 60'; Petroesc (yellow card) 73'	(Report)	Ghionea (yellow card) 29'; Guriţă 45+1'; Pelin (yellow card) 62'; Mărginean (yellow card) 67'; Cernea (yellow card) 85'; Orac (yellow card) 90+1'	Stadium: Astra; Attendance: 1,500; Referee: Iosif Biro

27 September 2003 Matchday 7	Oțelul Galați	4–1	Poli AEK	Galați
17:00	Rohat (yellow card) 15'; Ghionea (yellow card) 25'; Guriţă 49', 89'; Gheară 72'; Iacob 76'; Iacob 89'	(Report)	Marius Şuleap (yellow card) 33'; Mihai Dobre (yellow card) 64'; Stancu 88'	Stadium: Oțelul; Attendance: 8,000; Referee: Sorin Corpodean

4 October 2003 Matchday 8	Apulum Alba Iulia	2–1	Oțelul Galați	Alba Iulia
15:00	Miclea 15'; Emeric Vascko 41'; Aurel Himcinschi (yellow card) 42'; Cristinel Nedelea (yellow card) 78'; Ovidiu Maier (yellow card) 81'	(Report)	Iacob 2'; Gheară (yellow card) 21' (yellow-red card) 35'; Munteanu (red card) 90+3'; Toma (yellow card) 90+1'	Stadium: Victoria-Cetate; Attendance: 5,000; Referee: Anton Heleşteanu

18 October 2003 Matchday 9	Oțelul Galați	1–1	Ceahlăul Piatra Neamţ	Galați
14:30	Mărginean (yellow card) 37'; Pelin (yellow card) 65' (yellow-red card) 66'; Iacob 74'; Apostol (yellow card) 90'	(Report)	Ştefan Domşa 12'; Florin Axinia (yellow card) 26'; Burdujan (yellow card) 33' (yellow-red card) 76'; Nohai (yellow card) 69'	Stadium: Oțelul; Attendance: 7,000; Referee: Ionică Serea

25 October 2003 Matchday 10	FC Argeş	0–0	Oțelul Galați	Piteşti
15:00	Cosmin Năstăsie (yellow card) 57'	(Report)	Iacob (yellow card) 11'; Cernea (yellow card) 74'	Stadium: Nicolae Dobrin; Attendance: 1,000; Referee: Gheorghe Farcaş

1 November 2003 Matchday 11	Oțelul Galați	1–0	FC Bihor	Galați
13:30	Mărginean (yellow card) 37'; Orac 38'; Danciu (yellow card) 40'	(Report)	Mihai Marius Nicolae (yellow card) 43'; Mărginean (yellow card) 49'	Stadium: Oțelul; Attendance: 5,000; Referee: Anton Heleşteanu

9 November 2003 Matchday 12	Steaua București	2–0	Oțelul Galați	Bucharest
17:00	Răducanu 9'; Curt (yellow card) 38'; Răchita 90+3'	(Report)	Oprea (yellow card); Rohat (yellow card); Eusebio Iulian Tudor (yellow card)	Stadium: Steaua; Attendance: 3,000; Referee: Sorin Corpodean

22 November 2003 Matchday 13	Oțelul Galați	1–1	Naţional București	Galați
13:30	Iacob 26'; Toma (yellow card) 48'	(Report)	Cânu (yellow card) 21'; Moldovan (yellow card) 33'; Sylla (yellow card) 40'; Verdeş (yellow card) 46'; Coman (yellow card) 69'; Panc (yellow card) 77'; Caramarin 83' (pen.)	Stadium: Oțelul; Attendance: 4,500; Referee: Cristian Balaj

28 November 2003 Matchday 14	Oțelul Galați	1–0	Gloria Bistriţa	Galați
13:00	Ghionea (yellow card) 35'; Iacob 38'; Cernea (yellow card) 45'	(Report)	Negrean (yellow card) 48'; Cornea (yellow card) 66' (yellow-red card) 89'	Stadium: Oțelul; Attendance: 2,000; Referee: Sebastian Colţescu

6 December 2003 Matchday 15	FCM Bacău	1–0	Oțelul Galați	Bacău
14:00	Apostol 66'	(Report)	Eusebio Iulian Tudor (yellow card) 41'; Rohat (yellow card) 53'	Stadium: Municipal; Attendance: 4,000; Referee: Robert Dumitru

13 March 2004 Matchday 16	Universitatea Craiova	1–1	Oțelul Galați	Craiova
15:30	Alin Vigariu (yellow card) 38'; Murgan (yellow card) 55'; Pleşan 70'; Bundea (yellow card) 81'	(Report)	Oprea (yellow card) 44'; Cristian Eugen Negru 71'; Mărginean (yellow card) 78'; Danciu (yellow card) 81'; Ghionea (yellow card) 87'	Stadium: Ion Oblemenco; Attendance: 15,000; Referee: Marian Salomir

21 March 2004 Matchday 17	Oțelul Galați	2–1	Farul Constanţa	Galați
15:30	Danciu 50'; Apostol 53'; Mărginean (yellow card)	(Report)	Mihai 65' (pen.)	Stadium: Oțelul; Attendance: 8,000; Referee: Sorin Corpodean

28 March 2004 Matchday 18	FC Brașov	0–1	Oțelul Galați	Braşov
16:00	Constantin (yellow card) 48'; Baicu (yellow card) 64'; Stere (yellow card) 68'	(Report)	Călin (yellow card) 39'; Apostol (yellow card) 49', (goal) 80'; Dragomir (yellow card) 64'	Stadium: Silviu Ploieşteanu; Attendance: 2,000; Referee: Gheorghe Farcaş

3 April 2004 Matchday 19	Oțelul Galați	0–1	Rapid București	Galați
16:00	Ghionea (yellow card) 29'; Danciu (yellow card) 38'; Călin (yellow card) 45'	(Report)	Ilie 1'; Godfroid (yellow card) 33'; Negru (yellow card) 80'; Dolha (yellow card) 82'	Stadium: Oțelul; Attendance: 12,000; Referee: Ionică Serea

10 April 2004 Matchday 20	Dinamo București	2–0	Oțelul Galați	Bucharest
13:00	Alexa 47'; Bărcăuan (yellow card) 58'; Dănciulescu 86'	(Report)	Munteanu (yellow card) 13'; Toma (yellow card) 73'	Stadium: Dinamo; Attendance: 4,000; Referee: Robert Dumitru

14 April 2004 Matchday 21	Oțelul Galați	0–0	Petrolul Ploieşti	Galați
17:00	Danciu (yellow card) 16' (yellow-red card) 60'; Dobre (yellow card) 30'; Oprea (yellow card) 36' (yellow-red card) 64'; Cernea (yellow card) 90+2'; Toma (yellow card) 90+3'	(Report)	Cătălin Liţă (yellow card) 36'; Ghindaru (yellow card) 50'; Pastor (yellow card) 69'	Stadium: Oțelul; Attendance: 3,500; Referee: Alexandru Tudor

17 April 2004 Matchday 22	Poli AEK	0–0	Oțelul Galați	Timișoara
21:00	Dumitru (yellow card) 17'; Angheluţă (yellow card) 71'	(Report)	Cernea (yellow card) 42'; Mărginean (yellow card) 77'; Aldea (yellow card) 90+1'	Stadium: Dan Păltinişanu; Attendance: 20,000; Referee: Alexandru Deaconu

25 April 2004 Matchday 23	Oțelul Galați	3–0	Apulum Alba Iulia	Galați
16:30	Călin 8', 70'; Dobre 21'; Verdeş (yellow card) 34'; Ghionea (yellow card) 41'	(Report)		Stadium: Oțelul; Attendance: 7,000; Referee: Tiberiu Lajos

1 May 2004 Matchday 24	Ceahlăul Piatra Neamţ	1–1	Oțelul Galați	Piatra Neamţ
16:30	Constantin Enache (yellow card) 16', (goal) 75'; Goian (yellow card) 28'; Brujan (yellow card) 29'; Cristian Răuţă (yellow card) 41'; Tiberiu Şerban (yellow card) 60'; Marian Purică (yellow card) 61'; Nohai (yellow card) 76'	(Report)	Călin (yellow card) 8'; Rohat 14'; Nanu (red card) 71'; Apostol (yellow card) 76'; Dobre (yellow card) 79'	Stadium: Ceahlăul; Attendance: 4,000; Referee: Anton Heleşteanu

9 May 2004 Matchday 25	Oțelul Galați	1–1	FC Argeş	Galați
17:00	Oprea 33'; Apostol (yellow card) 43'	(Report)	Prepeliţă 31'; Stan (yellow card) 57'; Baicu (yellow card) 89'	Stadium: Oțelul; Attendance: 6,000; Referee: Cristian Balaj

12 May 2004 Matchday 26	FC Bihor	1–1	Oțelul Galați	Oradea
18:00	Munteanu (yellow card) 38'; Lazăr 48'; Gado (yellow card) 75'	(Report)	Aldea 22'; Danciu (yellow card) 77'; Gheară (yellow card) 80'	Stadium: Municipal; Attendance: 10,000; Referee: Marian Salomir

16 May 2004 Matchday 27	Oțelul Galați	2–2	Steaua București	Galați
17:00	Danciu (yellow card) 56'; Aldea 62'; Oprea 65'; Cernea (yellow card) 83'	(Report)	Ogăraru (yellow card) 30'; Dică 36' (pen.); Neaga 87', (yellow card) 89'	Stadium: Oțelul; Attendance: 14,000; Referee: Ionică Serea

23 May 2004 Matchday 28	Naţional București	1–2	Oțelul Galați	Bucharest
20:00	Chihaia 3'; Coman (yellow card) 7'; Moldovan (yellow card) 68'; Chihaia (yellow card) 75'; Olah (yellow card) 90+1'	(Report)	Ilie 82', 90'	Stadium: Cotroceni; Attendance: 300; Referee: Lucian Dan

30 May 2004 Matchday 29	Gloria Bistriţa	0–1	Oțelul Galați	Bistriţa
17:00	Jula (yellow card) 67' (yellow-red card) 85'; Rus (yellow card) 77'	(Report)	Oprea (yellow card) 19'; Danciu (yellow card) 73'; Munteanu (yellow card) 81', (goal) 90+2'	Stadium: Gloria; Attendance: 500; Referee: Cristian Sava

3 June 2004 Matchday 30	Oțelul Galați	2–2	FCM Bacău	Galați
17:00	Gheară (yellow card) 30'; Călin 31'; Munteanu 51'; Dragomir (yellow card) 73'	(Report)	Goian (yellow card) 23'; Ciocoiu 56' (pen.); Răducan 65'	Stadium: Oțelul; Attendance: 4,000; Referee: Augustus Constantin

=== Cupa României ===
1 October 2003 Round of 32	Laminorul Roman	0–2	Oțelul Galați	Roman
15:00		(Report)	Apostol 77'; Iacob 90'	Stadium: Moldova; Attendance: 5,000; Referee: Robert Rusu

22 October 2003 Round of 16	Naţional București	2–3	Oțelul Galați	Buzău
14:00	Verdeş 19' (pen.), (yellow card) 33'; Buta (yellow card) 52'; Wisdom Chibuike Onyekewere (yellow card) 58'; Savu 72'; Popa (yellow card) 73'	(Report)	Apostol (yellow card) 5', 93'; Iacob (yellow card) 40', (goal) 67' (pen.); Munteanu 75'	Stadium: Municipal; Attendance: 600; Referee: Augustus Constantin

3 December 2003 Quarter-final 1st leg	Oțelul Galați	2–0	Rapid București	Galați
13:30	Mărginean (yellow card) 29', (goal) 37'; Apostol 19', (yellow card) 52'; Rohat (yellow card) 80'	(Report)	Bădoi (yellow card) 59'; Ilie (yellow card) 73'; Constantin (yellow card) 90+2'; Maftei (yellow card) 90+3'	Stadium: Oțelul; Attendance: 7,500; Referee: Marian Salomir

17 March 2004 Quarter-final 2nd leg	Rapid București	1–0	Oțelul Galați	Bucharest
20:00	Bădoi 74'; Ilie (red card) 84'; Ziyati (yellow card) 86'	(Report)	Ilie (yellow card) 72'; Apostol (yellow card) 81'; Nanu (red card) 84'; Danciu (yellow card) 87'; Barbu (yellow card) 89'	Stadium: Giuleşti; Attendance: 12,000; Referee: Augustus Constantin

7 April 2004 Semi-final 1st leg	Gloria Bistriţa	0–1	Oțelul Galați	Bistriţa
15:00	Rus (red card) 12'; Velcea (yellow card) 40'	(Report)	Ilie 14' (pen.); Dragomir (yellow card) 45'; Toma (yellow card) 67'; Orac (yellow card) 83'	Stadium: Gloria; Attendance: 800; Referee: Sorin Corpodean

21 April 2004 Semi-final 2nd leg	Oțelul Galați	4–0	Gloria Bistriţa	Galați
15:00	Mărginean 1', (yellow card) 54'; Dobre 22'; Danciu 73'; Gheară (yellow card) 75'; Călin 77'	(Report)	Nicolae Vlad (yellow card) 34'; Miroslav Giuchic (yellow card) 45'; Negrean (yellow card) 72'	Stadium: Oțelul; Attendance: 5,000; Referee: Augustus Constantin

6 June 2004 Final	Oțelul Galați	0–2	Dinamo București	Bucharest
19:00	Aldea (yellow card) 54'; Dobre (yellow card) 63'; Călin (yellow card) 64'	(Report)	Bărcăuan (yellow card) 19'; Alexa (yellow card) 40'; Angelo Alistar (yellow card) 45'; Munteanu 66'; Niculescu 77'; Semeghin (yellow card) 79'	Stadium: Cotroceni; Attendance: 10,000; Referee: Cristian Balaj

== Players ==
=== Squad statistics ===
				Total			Divizia A		Cupa României	
No.	Pos.	Nat.	Name	Sts	App	Gls	App	Gls	App	Gls
–	FW	(Romania)	Aldea	8	14	2	12	2	2	
–		(Romania)	Apostol	19	26	5	20	2	6	3
–		(Romania)	Baldovin	3	7		7			
–	GK	(Romania)	Barbu	13	14		12		2	
–	FW	(Romania)	Bucătaru		1		1			
–		(Romania)	Călin	9	14	4	10	3	4	1
–		(Romania)	Cernat	3	4		4			
–		(Romania)	Cernea	24	25		19		6	
–		(Romania)	Danciu	27	27	2	22	1	5	1
–		(Romania)	Dobre	27	28	2	23	1	5	1
–		(Romania)	Dragomir	17	23		19		4	
–		(Romania)	Gheară	17	26	1	21	1	5	
–	CB	(Romania)	Ghionea	33	33		26		7	
–	FW	(Romania)	Guriţă	15	18	4	15	4	3	
–	FW	(Romania)	Iacob	17	17	8	14	6	3	2
–	FW	(Romania)	Ilie	6	18	3	14	2	4	1
–		(Romania)	Izvoranu	3	4		4			
–		(Romania)	Macare		1		1			
–		(Romania)	Mărginean	25	26	3	21	1	5	2
–		(Romania)	Munteanu	22	27	3	20	2	7	1
–		(Romania)	Nanu	14	15		11		4	
–		(Romania)	Negru	6	9	1	7	1	2	
–	FW	(Romania)	Oprea	24	28	2	24	2	4	
–	FW	(Romania)	Orac	3	12	1	10	1	2	
–		(Romania)	Pelin	14	15		15			
–		(Romania)	Rohat	35	35	1	28	1	7	
–	FB	(Romania)	Toma	14	22		17		5	
–		(Romania)	Tudor	5	11		9		2	
–		(Romania)	Verdeş	3	6		5		1	

Last updated: 11 March 2010
Source: RomanianSoccer and Viaţa Liberă
Ordered by player name
0 shown as blank

== Transfers ==
=== In ===
No.	Pos.	Nat.	Name	Age	EU	Moving from	Type	Transfer window	Ends	Transfer fee	Source
–	DM	(Romania)	Izvoranu	20	EU	Dunărea Galați	Transfer	Summer		Undisclosed	
–	WI	(Romania)	Orac	18	EU	Steaua București	Loan	Summer		Undisclosed	
–	GK	(Romania)	Barbu	32	EU	Inter Gaz	Transfer	Summer		Undisclosed	
–	CB	(Romania)	Ghionea	24	EU	Steaua București	Loan	Summer		Undisclosed	
–	CB	(Romania)	Munteanu	25	EU	Farul Constanța	Transfer	Summer		Undisclosed	
–	ST	(Romania)	Aldea	22	EU	Petrolul Ploiești	Transfer	Summer		Free	
–	CB	(Romania)	Rohat	28	EU	Petrolul Ploiești	Transfer	Summer		Free	
–	RM	(Romania)	Apostol	22	EU	Gloria Buzău	Transfer	Summer		Undisclosed	
–	RM	(Romania)	Tudor	29	EU	Petrolul Ploiești	Transfer	Summer		Free	
–	CB	(Romania)	Gheară	24	EU	Corvinul	Transfer	Summer		Free	
–	LB	(Romania)	Dragomir	28	EU	Universitatea Craiova	Transfer	Summer		Free	
–	ST	(Romania)	Iacob	22	EU	Progresul București	Transfer	Summer		Undisclosed	
–	AM	(Romania)	Danciu	26	EU	Astra Ploiești	Transfer	Summer		Undisclosed	
–	RB	(Romania)	Baldovin	31	EU	Universitatea Craiova	Transfer	Summer		Undisclosed	
–	RM	(Romania)	Dobre	27	EU	Astra Ploiești	Transfer	Summer		Undisclosed	
–	GK	(Romania)	Cernea	27	EU	Petrolul Ploiești	Loaned	Summer		Undisclosed	
–	LB	(Romania)	Nanu	35	EU	Steaua București	Transfer	Winter		Undisclosed	
–	ST	(Romania)	Verdeş	23	EU	Progresul București	Transfer	Winter		Undisclosed	
–	ST	(Romania)	Ilie	26	EU	FC Oneşti	Transfer	Winter		Undisclosed	
–	ST	(Romania)	Negru	27	EU	Farul Constanța	Transfer	Winter		Undisclosed	
–	AM	(Romania)	Călin	30	EU	Liaoning Whowin (China)	Transfer	Winter		Free	
-	AM	(Romania)	Vintilă	20	EU	Politehnica Iași	Transfer	Winter		Undisclosed	
-	DF	(Romania)	Pârvu	27	EU	Al-Wahda (Saudi Arabia)	Transfer	Winter		Undisclosed	

=== Out ===
No.	Pos.	Nat.	Name	Age	EU	Moving to	Type	Transfer window	Transfer fee	Source
–	LM	(Romania)	Tănase	32	EU	Argeș Pitești	Transfer	Summer	Undisclosed	
–	CB	(Brazil)	Vieira		Non-EU		Released	Summer		
–	CB	(Romania)	Tofan	33	EU		Retired	Summer		
–		(Romania)	Maleş		EU		Retired	Summer		
–	ST	(Romania)	Guriţă	30	EU	Farul Constanța	Transfer	Winter	Undisclosed	
–	ST	(Romania)	Iacob	23	EU	Rapid București	Transfer	Winter	Undisclosed	
–	RM	(Romania)	Cernat	22	EU		Released	Winter	Undisclosed	
–	ST	(Romania)	Bucătaru	21	EU	Zimbru Chișinău (Moldova)	Transfer	Winter	Undisclosed	
–	RM	(Romania)	Tudor	29	EU	Vaslui	Transfer	Winter	Undisclosed	
–	RB	(Romania)	Baldovin	32	EU	Progresul București	Transfer	Winter	Undisclosed	

EU = if holds or not a European Union passport; Country: when 2 flags, 1st flag = country that plays for internationally, 2nd flag = country of birth; N = number on jersey; P = Position (for position name, pause mouse pointer on abbreviation); Name = Name on jersey (for more extensive name, pause mouse pointer on name); Age = age on the day of the signing; Moving from = only indicate the club the player was playing before start playing for this club in this season, for the type of the moving see Status column; Moving to = only indicates the club the player is going to play next, for the type of the moving see Status column; Ends = when the player's current contract ends; n/a = Not applicable.

== See also ==
- 2003–04 Divizia A
- 2003–04 Cupa României
