= Ovidiu Burcă =

Romanian footballer (born 1980)

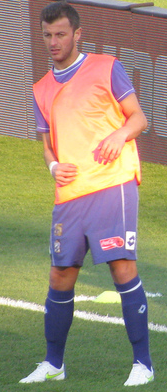
- Burcă warming up before a game in 2011

Personal information
- Full name: Ovidiu Nicușor Burcă
- Date of birth: 16 March 1980 (age 46)
- Place of birth: Slatina, Romania
- Height: 1.83 m (6 ft 0 in)
- Position: Centre-back

Team information
- Current team: Sepsi OSK (head coach)

Youth career
- 1986–1996: CSȘ Slatina
- 1996–1998: Școala de Fotbal Gheorghe Popescu

Senior career*
Years	Team	Apps	(Gls)
1998–1999	Emelec	6	(0)
1999	JEF United Ichihara	4	(0)
2000	Ventforet Kofu	16	(1)
2001–2002	Universitatea Craiova	25	(0)
2002–2005	Dinamo București	48	(0)
2002–2003	→ Poiana Câmpina (loan)	1	(0)
2004–2005	→ Dinamo București II (loan)	10	(0)
2005–2007	Național București	39	(2)
2007–2010	Energie Cottbus	39	(0)
2008	→ Beijing Guoan (loan)	15	(1)
2010–2011	Politehnica Timișoara	20	(0)
2011–2012	Rapid București	24	(1)
Total		247	(5)

International career
2001	Romania U21	4	(0)

Managerial career
- 2014–2015: Oțelul Galați (sporting director)
- 2015–2020: Rapid București (president)
- 2020: Rapid București (sporting director)
- 2020–2021: Rapid București U19
- 2021: Rapid II București
- 2021–2022: CSM Slatina
- 2022–2023: Dinamo București
- 2024: Voluntari
- 2025: Oțelul Galați
- 2025–: Sepsi OSK
- * Club domestic league appearances and goals

Ovidiu Nicușor Burcă (born 16 March 1980) is a Romanian professional football manager and former player, who is in charge of Liga I club Sepsi OSK.

== Club career ==
=== Early career ===
Burcă was born on 16 March 1980 in Slatina, Romania. His football talent was noticed by coach Nicolae Zamfir who brought him to the Școala de Fotbal Gheorghe Popescu.

=== Emelec ===
He started his senior career at Ecuadorian side Emelec in 1998. Burcă made his Ecuadorian Serie A debut in a Clásico del Astillero match against Barcelona in which he dislocated his shoulder, an injury that kept him off the field for two and a half months. He made a total of six league appearances in his single season spent with El Bombillo.

=== JEF United Ichihara and Ventforet Kofu ===
Afterwards he went to JEF United Ichihara in Japan where he made his J.League debut on 25 March 2000 when coach Nicolae Zamfir sent him in the 65th minute to replace Kazuhiro Suzuki in a 6–1 home loss to Vissel Kobe. He played only four league matches for JEF United.

He stayed in Japan, signing with J2 League team Ventforet Kofu where he played sixteen matches and scored one goal.

=== Universitatea Craiova ===
Burcă returned to Romania to play for Universitatea Craiova, making his Divizia A debut on 5 May 2001 under coach Nicolae Ungureanu in a 3–1 home win over Oțelul Galați. During his spell with "U" Craiova he began playing in European competitions, appearing in both legs of the 5–4 loss to Synot in the second round of the 2001 Intertoto Cup, receiving a red card in the second leg. In 2002 when Craiova owner Gheorghe Nețoiu left the team to go to Dinamo, he took players Burcă, Cosmin Bărcăuan, Dan Alexa, Flavius Stoican, Ciprian Danciu, Ștefan Preda, Cornel Frăsineanu and Ștefan Grigorie with him.

=== Dinamo București ===
His first performance with Dinamo came when coach Ioan Andone sent him in the 71st minute to replace Gabriel Tamaș in the 1–0 victory in the 2003 Cupa României final against Național București. In the following season he helped the club win The Double, being used by Andone in 22 league games and again as a substitute in the Cupa României final, sending him this time in the 90th minute to replace Angelo Alistar in the 2–0 victory against Oțelul Galați. In the same season he made five appearances in the UEFA Cup, helping his side get past Liepājas Metalurgs and Shakhtar Donetsk, being eliminated by Spartak Moscow. Afterwards, Burcă played in both legs of the 2–0 aggregate win against Žilina in the 2004–05 Champions League qualifying rounds. His last trophy won with The Red Dogs was the 2004–05 Cupa României as coach Andone used him as a starter until the 56th minute when he replaced him with Ianis Zicu in the 1–0 victory against Farul Constanța in the final. During his years spent at Dinamo, he also made appearances for the club's satellite teams, Poiana Câmpina and Dinamo II in Divizia B. He gained significant football knowledge while playing alongside Gheorghe Popescu, who had a brief spell with the team.

=== Național București ===
After spending three years at Dinamo, Burcă signed with Național București in 2005. There, he played in a relaxed environment, without pressure, being the team's captain at one point. At Național he also netted his first Divizia A goal on 1 April 2006 in a 2–0 home victory against Gloria Bistrița. His biggest achievement with The Bankers was reaching the 2006 Cupa României final where coach Cristiano Bergodi used him the entire match in the 1–0 loss to Rapid București.

=== Energie Cottbus and Beijing Guoan ===
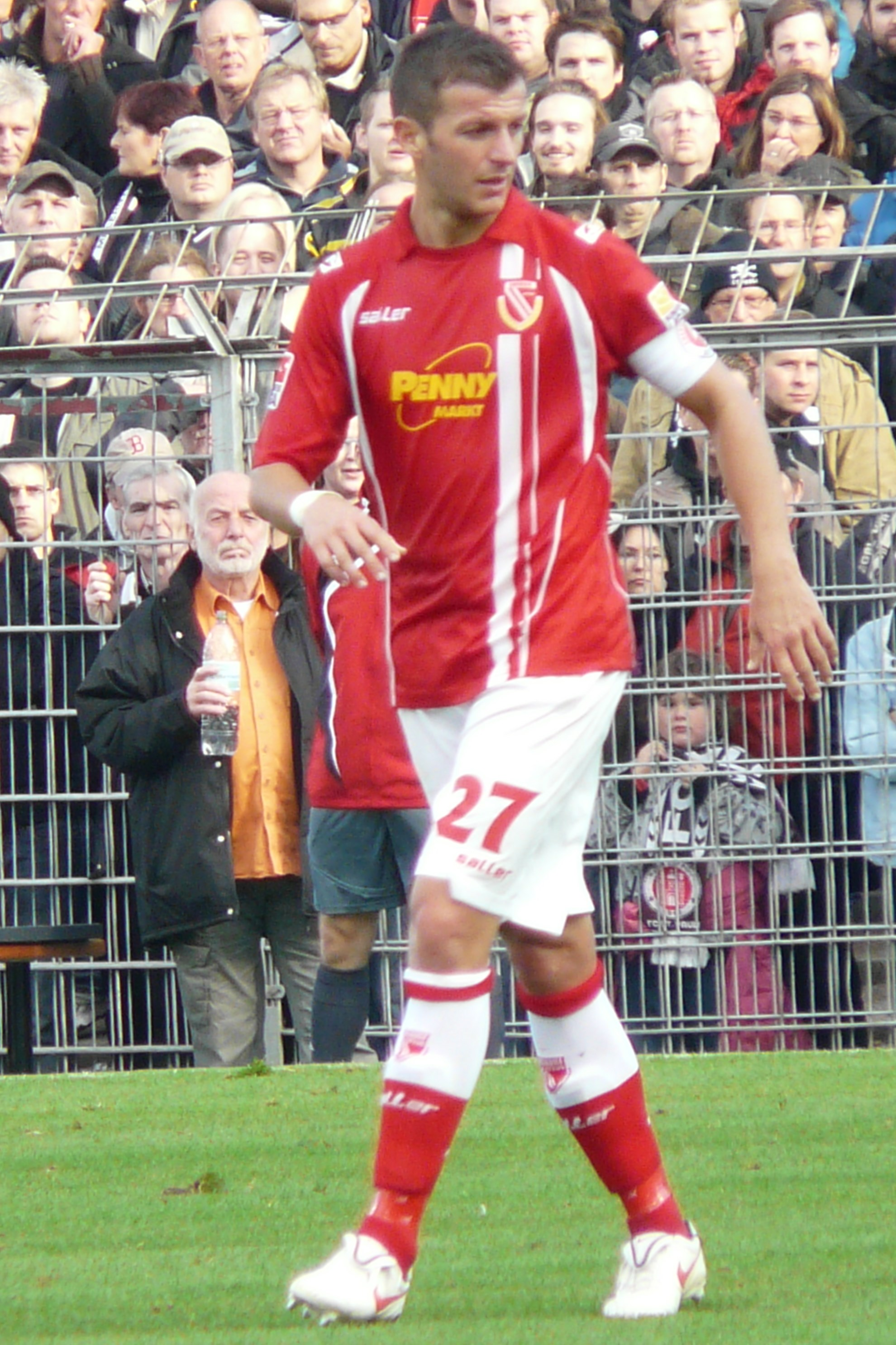
Burcă with Energie Cottbus in 2009

In June 2007, Bundesliga side Energie Cottbus announced signing him on a three-year contract, and there he would be a colleague with compatriots Sergiu Radu and Emil Jula. However, in his first season at the club he did not make any appearances due to a serious injury, which resulted in a year-long break in the 2007–08 season.

He was loaned out in 2008 to Chinese club Beijing Guoan where he netted one goal in 15 games.

Afterwards he came back to Energie, making his Bundesliga debut on 21 February 2009 under coach Bojan Prašnikar in a 2–1 home victory against Werder Bremen. At the end of the season, the club reached a relegation play-off where they were defeated by Nürnberg. He stayed with the club for the 2009–10 2. Bundesliga season, playing regularly for Energie, being the team's captain at one point.

=== Politehnica Timișoara ===
After his contract with the German side expired, Burcă signed a one-year contract with Politehnica Timișoara, returning to the Romanian first division after three years. He made his debut in a Europa League play-off game against Manchester City which ended in a 2–0 loss. He helped The White-Purples finish runner-up at the end of the 2010–11 season.

=== Rapid București ===
Burcă signed with Rapid București in June 2011. Under the guidance of coach Răzvan Lucescu, he helped the team eliminate Śląsk Wrocław with 4–2 on aggregate in the play-offs of the 2010–11 Europa League, reaching the group stage of the competition. He reached the 2012 Cupa României final, but he was not used by Lucescu in the 1–0 loss to Dinamo București. He made his last appearance in the Romanian first league on 19 November 2012 in Rapid's 2–1 home win against Gaz Metan Mediaș in which he received a red card, totaling 156 matches with three goals in the competition and 17 games in European Cups (including two in the Intertoto Cup).

== International career ==
In 2001, Burcă made several appearances for Romania's under-21 squad.

== Managerial career ==
After he ended his playing career, Burcă worked as a sporting director for Oțelul Galați in the 2014–15 season. In 2015 he was appointed president at Rapid București, a position he occupied until 2020. He started the 2020–21 season as coach of Rapid's under-19 team, then in January 2021 he became the coach of the club's satellite team.

He led his hometown club, CSM Slatina during the 2021–22 Liga III season, managing to promote the team to Liga II. In the 2022–23 Liga II season he led Dinamo București to promotion to the first division after an 8–5 aggregate win over Argeș Pitești in a promotion play-off. In the following season, Burcă led Dinamo until November 2023, leaving after earning only 10 points in 17 matches.

One year later, in November 2024 he was appointed head coach of Liga II side Voluntari but left one month later after only three games. On 1 January 2025, he returned to Liga I football, signing with Oțelul Galați, but left about three months later after obtaining only two victories in 10 matches.

On 16 June 2025, Burcă was named coach of second league club Sepsi OSK. He helped them achieve first-league promotion at the end of the 2025–26 season.

== Personal life ==
Burcă was married to Sandra, whom he met in high school, and later had a seven-year relationship with Adriana, with whom he has two children. He is a psychology graduate.

== Managerial statistics ==
As of 8 November 2026

Team	From	To	Record							
Team	From	To	G	W	D	L	GF	GA	GD	Win %
Rapid II București	19 January 2021	30 June 2021	8	2	1	5	8	12	−4	25.00
CSM Slatina	13 September 2021	30 June 2022	29	18	7	4	49	17	+32	62.07
Dinamo București	21 July 2022	28 November 2023	56	19	15	22	73	72	+1	33.93
Voluntari	27 November 2024	30 December 2024	3	2	1	0	4	1	+3	66.67
Oțelul Galați	1 January 2025	19 March 2025	10	2	2	6	7	13	−6	20.00
Sepsi OSK	16 June 2026	present	52	24	16	12	66	53	+13	46.15
Total			158	67	42	49	207	168	+39	42.41

== Honours ==
=== Player ===
Dinamo București

- Divizia A: 2003–04
- Cupa României: 2002–03, 2003–04, 2004–05

Național București

- Cupa României runner-up: 2005–06

Rapid București

- Cupa României runner-up: 2011–12

=== Coach ===
CSM Slatina

- Liga III: 2021–22
