= 2004 Cupa României final =

- Event: 2003–04 Cupa României
Dinamo București	Oțelul Galați
Divizia A	Divizia A
2	0
- Date: 6 June 2004
- Venue: Stadionul Cotroceni, Bucharest
- Referee: Cristian Balaj (Romania)
- Attendance: 10,000

The 2004 Cupa României final was the 66th final of Romania's most prestigious cup competition. The final was played at the Stadionul Cotroceni in Bucharest on 6 June 2004 and was contested between Divizia A sides Dinamo București and Oţelul Galaţi. The cup was won by Dinamo.

== Route to the final ==
FC Dinamo București

Round of 32	Inter Gaz București	2–5	Dinamo București
Round of 16	Dinamo București	5–1	CS Otopeni
Quarter-finals 1st Leg	Dinamo București	7–0	Petrolul Ploieşti
Quarter-finals 2nd Leg	Petrolul Ploieşti	1–2	Dinamo București
Semi-finals 1st Leg	Argeş Piteşti	1–0	Dinamo București
Semi-finals 2nd Leg	Dinamo București	2–0	Argeş Piteşti

FC Oțelul Galați

Round of 32	Laminorul Roman	0–2	Oțelul Galați
Round of 16	Naţional București	2–3 (aet, gg)	Oțelul Galați
Quarter-finals 1st Leg	Oţelul Galaţi	2–0	Rapid București
Quarter-finals 2nd Leg	Rapid București	1–0	Oțelul Galați
Semi-finals 1st Leg	Gloria Bistriţa	0–1	Oțelul Galați
Semi-finals 2nd Leg	Oțelul Galați	4–0	Gloria Bistriţa

== Match details ==
6 June 2004
19:00 EEST

Dinamo București	2–0	Oțelul Galați
Munteanu 66'; Niculescu 77'	Report

Stadionul Cotroceni, Bucharest
Attendance: 10,000
Referee: Cristian Balaj (Romania)

Dinamo București	Oțelul Galați

DINAMO BUCUREŞTI:
GK	23	(Romania) Cristian Munteanu
DF	24	(Romania) Cosmin Bărcăuan	(yellow card) 19'
DF	6	(Romania) Angelo Alistar	(yellow card) 45'	(substituted off) 90'
DF	16	(Romania) Adrian Iordache
MF	8	(Romania) Florentin Petre (c)
MF	21	(Romania) Ionuţ Badea		(substituted off) 55'
MF	5	(Romania) Dan Alexa	(yellow card) 40'
MF	25	(Romania) Iulian Tameş
MF	3	(Romania) Dorin Semeghin	(yellow card) 79'
FW	9	(Romania) Claudiu Niculescu		(substituted off) 91'
FW	20	(Romania) Ştefan Grigorie
Substitutes:
GK	12	(Romania) Ştefan Preda
DF	4	(Romania) Ovidiu Burcă		(substituted in) 90'
DF	2	(Romania) Liviu Ciobotariu
DF	27	(Romania) Szabolcs Perenyi
MF	16	(Romania) Vlad Munteanu		(substituted in) 55'
MF	17	(Romania) Leonard Naidin
FW	22	(Romania) Cristian Cigan		(substituted in) 91'
Manager:
(Romania) Ioan Andone

OȚELUL GALAȚI:
GK	22	(Romania) Cornel Cernea
DF	21	(Romania) Cornel Dobre	(yellow card) 63'
DF	25	(Romania) Daniel Munteanu
DF	5	(Romania) Gheorghe Rohat
DF	24	(Romania) Sorin Ghionea (c)
DF	4	(Romania) Ştefan Nanu
MF	6	(Romania) Cosmin Mărginean
MF	8	(Romania) Ciprian Danciu		(substituted off) 41'
MF	23	(Romania) Iulian Apostol		(substituted off) 60'
FW	9	(Romania) Bogdan Aldea	(yellow card) 54'
FW	26	(Romania) Dănuţ Oprea		(substituted off) 70'
Substitutes:
GK	12	(Romania) Mihai Barbu
LB	16	(Romania) Ionuț Dragomir
DF	20	(Romania) Decebal Gheară		(substituted in) 41'
DF	15	(Romania) Silviu Izvoranu
MF	7	(Romania) Augustin Călin	(yellow card) 64'	(substituted in) 60'
FW	13	(Romania) Mircea Ilie		(substituted in) 70'
FW	19	(Romania) Cristian Negru
Manager:
(Romania) Sorin Cârţu

MATCH OFFICIALS

- Assistant referees:
  - (Romania) Cristian Nica
  - (Romania) Ionel Popa
- Fourth official:
  - (Romania) Augustus Constantin

MAN OF THE MATCH

MATCH RULES

- 90 minutes.
- 30 minutes extra-time (15 minute intervals)
- Penalty shoot-out if scores level after extra time.
- Seven named substitutes
- Maximum of 3 substitutions.
