= Cosmin Bărcăuan =

Romanian footballer and manager

Personal information
- Date of birth: 5 August 1978 (age 48)
- Place of birth: Oradea, Romania
- Height: 1.82 m (6 ft 0 in)
- Positions: Centre-back; right-back; striker

Senior career*
Years	Team	Apps	(Gls)
1994–1998	Bihor Oradea (Note: The statistics for the 1996–97 and 1997–98 Divizia C seasons are unavailable.)	44	(7)
1998	→ Gloria Bistrița (loan)	0	(0)
1999–2002	FC Universitatea Craiova	97	(16)
2002–2004	Dinamo București	51	(17)
2004–2007	Shakhtar Donetsk	21	(1)
2005	→ Krylya Sovetov (loan)	2	(0)
2005–2006	→ Dinamo București (loan)	8	(0)
2006–2007	→ PAOK (loan)	26	(0)
2007–2010	OFI	49	(2)
2010	Ceahlăul Piatra Neamț	12	(0)
Total		310	(43)

International career
2000–2004	Romania	8	(2)

Managerial career
- 2010–2011: Astera Sílata
- 2011–2015: Digenis Lakkoma
- 2016–2018: Olympiacos Academy
- 2018: Voluntari II
- 2020–2022: Olympiacos Academy
- * Club domestic league appearances and goals

Cosmin Bărcăuan (born 5 August 1978) is a Romanian former football player and current coach.

== Club career ==
Bărcăuan was born on 5 August 1978 in Oradea, Romania and began playing junior-level football at local club Bihor. He started his senior career in 1994 at Bihor in Divizia B. He spent several seasons at the club, including in Divizia C, with a brief spell in 1998 at first-league side, Gloria Bistrița where he did not play. Subsequently, he joined FC Universitatea Craiova where on 10 April 1999 he made his Divizia A debut under coach Marian Bondrea in a 2–1 home win over his former club, Gloria Bistrița. He was used by coach Emil Săndoi the full 90 minutes in the 2000 Cupa României final, as "U" Craiova lost 2–0 to Dinamo București. In 2002 when Craiova owner Gheorghe Nețoiu left the team to go to Dinamo, he took players Bărcăuan, Dan Alexa, Flavius Stoican, Ovidiu Burcă, Ciprian Danciu, Ștefan Preda, Cornel Frăsineanu and Ștefan Grigorie with him.

In his first season with The Red Dogs, he scored a personal record of 12 goals, and also won the Cupa României, as coach Ioan Andone used him the entire match in the 1–0 win over Național București in the final. In the following season, Andone started using him as a defender, despite having played as a striker until then. In this new position he was used by Andone in 28 league matches and still managed to score five goals, including one in a 2–1 victory in a derby against Steaua București as the team won the title. In the same season, Dinamo won another Cupa României, Bărcăuan playing the full 90 minutes in the 2–0 win over Oțelul Galați in the final. He also helped the club eliminate Liepājas Metalurgs and Shakhtar Donetsk in the 2003–04 UEFA Cup, scoring once against the first.

Bărcăuan was transferred by Shakhtar Donetsk which paid $1 million to Dinamo; there, he became teammates with fellow Romanians Flavius Stoican, Daniel Florea, Ciprian Marica and Răzvan Raț, and he was coached by Mircea Lucescu. Bărcăuan made his Vyshcha Liha on 15 July 2004 in a Klasychne derby which was won with 2–0 against Dynamo Kyiv, scoring his first goal in the competition on 29 October in a 2–1 away victory over Kryvbas Kryvyi Rih. That would be his only goal scored in the 19 league appearances he made, as the team won the title. In the same season he played five games in the 2004–05 Champions League group stage, including a 2–0 victory against Barcelona.

He played only two games in the first half of the following season, as Shakhtar won another title. In 2005, Bărcăuan was loaned to Krylya Sovetov where he was teammates with compatriot Florin Șoavă. He made only two Russian Premier League appearances, with the first one taking place on 10 September when coach Gadzhi Gadzhiyev used him the full 90 minutes in a 1–0 home loss to Torpedo Moscow. In 2006, he was loaned back to Dinamo București for half a year. His next loan spell was at Super League Greece side PAOK, for the 2006–07 season, making his debut in the competition on 19 August 2006 as coach Ilie Dumitrescu used him the entire match in a 0–0 draw against AEK Athens.

After one season in which he played regularly for PAOK, he remained in the league, signing with OFI. There, on his debut under coach Reiner Maurer which took place on 2 September 2007 he scored one goal in the 3–2 victory against Apollon Kalamarias. OFI were relegated in his second season at the club. Afterwards, he played three games for them in the 2009–10 Beta Ethniki, before leaving the club and returning to Romania at Ceahlăul Piatra Neamț. Bărcăuan made his last appearance in the Romanian first league on 12 March 2010 in Ceahlăul's 4–2 home loss to CFR Cluj, totaling 168 matches with 33 goals in the competition.

== International career ==
Bărcăuan made eight appearances and scored two goals for Romania, making his debut on 15 November 2000 when coach László Bölöni sent him to replace Adrian Mutu in the 52nd minute of a 2–1 friendly victory against FR Yugoslavia in which he scored the decisive goal. He scored his second goal for the national team in a friendly that ended in a 3–2 away victory against Algeria. Bărcăuan's last four games for Romania were in the 2006 World Cup qualifiers.

== Managerial career ==
Bărcăuan started his coaching career in 2010, at Greek fourth league side, Astera Sílata. Afterwards he worked at Digenis Lakkoma with whom he managed two promotions, first from the fifth league to the fourth and then from the fourth to the third.

In 2016, he worked with juniors at the Olympiacos Academy. In 2018 he coached for a short while Voluntari's satellite team in the Romanian third league, returning in 2020 to coach the youth of Olympiacos Academy for two more years.

== Career statistics ==
=== International ===
Appearances and goals by national team and year
National team	Year	Apps	Goals
Romania	2000	3	2
Romania	2001	–	
Romania	2002	–	
Romania	2003	–	
Romania	2004	5	0
Total		8	2

Scores and results list Romania's goal tally first, score column indicates score after each Bărcăuan goal.

List of international goals scored by Cosmin Bărcăuan
No.	Date	Venue	Opponent	Score	Result	Competition
1	15 November 2000	Stadionul Steaua, Bucharest, Romania	FR Yugoslavia	2–1	2–1	Friendly
2	8 December 2000	19 May 1956 Stadium, Annaba, Algeria	Algeria	1–0	3–2	Friendly

== Honours ==
=== Player ===
Bihor Oradea

- Divizia C: 1997–98

Universitatea Craiova

- Cupa României runner-up: 1999–00

Dinamo București

- Divizia A: 2003–04
- Cupa României: 2002–03, 2003–04

Shakhtar Donetsk

- Ukrainian Premier League: 2004–05, 2005–06
