= 1997–98 FC Dinamo București season =

FC Dinamo București
1997–98 season
- Head coach: Cornel Dinu
- Divizia A: 6th
- Romanian Cup: Semi-finals
- UEFA Cup: First round

The 1997–98 season was FC Dinamo București's 49th season in Divizia A. Dinamo finished 6th in the league and reached the semi-finals of the Romanian Cup. In the UEFA Cup, they played in first round.

== Players ==
=== Squad information ===
Squad at end of season

Note: Flags indicate national team as defined under FIFA eligibility rules; some limited exceptions apply. Players may hold more than one non-FIFA nationality.

No.	Pos.	Nation	Player
1	GK	ROU	Florin Prunea
12	GK	ROU	Daniel Tudor
21	GK	ROU	Cristian Munteanu
—	GK	ROU	Ștefan Preda
2	DF	ROU	Cosmin Contra
19	DF	ROU	Cornel Dobre
7	DF	ROU	Lucian Cotora
4	DF	ROU	Florin Bătrânu
—	DF	ROU	Liviu Ciobotariu
5	DF	ROU	Leontin Grozavu
—	DF	ROU	Ionel Șerban
24	DF	ROU	Cosmin Bodea
9	DF	ROU	Florin Ionescu
—	DF	ROU	Florin Lazăr
—	DF	ROU	Cristian Utfineanţ
15	DF	ROU	Florin Macavei
—	DF	ROU	Claudiu Mutu
20	DF	ROU	Daniel Florea
3	DF	ROU	Iosif Tâlvan

No.	Pos.	Nation	Player
6	MF	ROU	Mihai Tararache
8	MF	ROU	Florentin Petre
11	MF	ROU	Cătălin Hîldan
—	MF	ROU	Cezar Dinu
—	MF	ROU	Giani Kiriţă
—	MF	ROU	Dumitru Mere
—	MF	ROU	Paul Codrea
14	MF	ROU	Adrian Pitu
—	MF	ROU	Iulian Tameş
23	MF	ROU	Daniel Rednic
—	MF	ROU	Mihai Antal
13	FW	ROU	Adrian Mihalcea
—	MF	ROU	Augustin Călin
18	FW	ROU	Marian Ivan
—	FW	ROU	Eugen Neagoe
16	FW	ROU	Marius Niculae
—	FW	ROU	Bogdan Vrăjitoarea

== League table ==
Pos	Team	Pld	W	D	L	GF	GA	GD	Pts	Qualification or relegation
1	Steaua București (C)	34	25	5	4	83	36	+47	80	Qualification to Champions League second qualifying round
2	Rapid București	34	24	6	4	70	24	+46	78	Qualification to Cup Winners' Cup qualifying round
3	Argeș Pitești	34	20	5	9	56	38	+18	65	Qualification to UEFA Cup first qualifying round
4	Oțelul Galați	34	20	4	10	54	28	+26	64	Qualification to UEFA Cup first qualifying round
5	Național București	34	18	6	10	57	40	+17	60	Qualification to Intertoto Cup first round
6	Dinamo București	34	17	3	14	66	50	+16	54	
7	Reșița	34	15	6	13	55	49	+6	51	
8	Universitatea Craiova	34	15	4	15	65	46	+19	49 (Note: CRA 4-1 CEA; CEA 3-2 CRA)	
9	Ceahlăul Piatra Neamț	34	14	7	13	46	49	−3	49	
10	Bacău	34	12	9	13	41	42	−1	45	
11	Gloria Bistrița	34	13	5	16	56	63	−7	44	
12	Farul Constanța	34	13	4	17	36	52	−16	43	
13	Universitatea Cluj	34	11	7	16	42	40	+2	40 (Note: UCL 2-0 PET; PET 2-1 UCL)	
14	Petrolul Ploiești	34	11	7	16	41	45	−4	40	
15	Foresta Suceava	34	10	9	15	32	41	−9	39	
16	Chindia Târgoviște (R)	34	10	8	16	40	67	−27	38	Relegation to Divizia B
17	Sportul Studențesc București (R)	34	5	4	25	32	65	−33	19	Relegation to Divizia B
18	Jiul Petroşani (R)	34	3	1	30	19	116	−97	10	Relegation to Divizia B

Source: LT (in Romanian)
Rules for classification: 1) points; 2) head-to-head points; 3) head-to-head goal difference; 4) head-to-head goals scored; 5) goal difference; 6) number of goals scored.
(C) Champions; (R) Relegated

== Results ==
Dinamo's score comes first

=== Legend ===
Win	Draw	Loss

=== Divizia A ===
Date	Opponent	Venue	Result	Scorers
3 August 1997	Universitatea Craiova	A	1–2	
6 August 1997	Rapid București	H	0–2	
9 August 1997	Ceahlăul Piatra Neamț	H	2–0	
23 August 1997	Argeș Pitești	A	1–2	
30 August 1997	Chindia Târgoviște	H	4–1	
13 September 1997	Petrolul Ploiești	A	2–1	
20 September 1997	Farul Constanța	H	5–3	
24 September 1997	Sportul Studențesc București	A	0–1	
27 September 1997	Gloria Bistrița	H	4–3	
4 October 1997	Universitatea Cluj	A	1–0	
15 October 1997	Steaua București	H	1–3	
18 October 1997	Jiul Petroşani	A	5–2	
26 October 1997	Oțelul Galați	H	2–0	
2 November 1997	Național București	A	1–1	
8 November 1997	CSM Reșița	H	1–1	
15 November 1997	FCM Bacău	A	0–3	
22 November 1997	Foresta Suceava	H	2–0	
30 November 1997	Universitatea Craiova	H	3–0	
7 December 1997	Rapid București	A	0–2	
13 December 1997	Ceahlăul Piatra Neamț	A	1–2	
1 March 1998	Argeș Pitești	H	2–0	
7 March 1998	Chindia Târgoviște	A	0–1	
11 March 1998	Petrolul Ploiești	H	3–0	
14 March 1998	Farul Constanța	A	1–2	
22 March 1998	Sportul Studențesc București	H	2–0	
29 March 1998	Gloria Bistrița	A	2–3	
1 April 1998	Universitatea Cluj	H	2–1	
4 April 1998	Steaua București	A	0–5	
11 April 1998	Jiul Petroşani	H	7–1	
15 April 1998	Oțelul Galați	A	0–1	
18 April 1998	Național București	H	4–2	
25 April 1998	CSM Reșița	A	0–0	
29 April 1998	FCM Bacău	H	6–2	
2 May 1998	Foresta Suceava	A	1–3	

=== Cupa României ===
Round	Date	Opponent	Venue	Result	Goalscorers
R of 32	12 November 1997	Corvinul Hunedoara	A	1–0	
R of 16	2 December 1997	Apulum Alba Iulia	H	2–0	
QF	25 February 1998	Oțelul Galați	H	1–0	
SF	25 March 1998	Rapid București	A	1–2	

=== UEFA Cup ===
23 July 1997
22:00

KR Reykjavík (Iceland)	2–0	(Romania) Dinamo Bucharest
Daníelsson 26'; Dadason 51'	Report

KR-völlur, Reykjavík
Referee: Dempsey (Republic of Ireland)

30 July 1997
16:00

Dinamo Bucharest (Romania)	1–2	(Iceland) KR Reykjavík
Mihalcea 42'	Report	Dadason 12', 22'

Bucharest

KR Reykjavík won 4–1 on aggregate.
