= Ștefan Grigorie =

Romanian footballer

Personal information
- Full name: Ștefan Costel Grigorie
- Date of birth: 31 January 1982 (age 44)
- Place of birth: Segarcea, Romania
- Height: 1.76 m (5 ft 9 in)
- Position: Midfielder

Team information
- Current team: Politehnica Timișoara (assistant)

Youth career
- –1999: Universitatea Craiova

Senior career*
Years	Team	Apps	(Gls)
1999–2002	Universitatea Craiova	58	(7)
2000	→ Electro Craiova (loan)	9	(1)
2002–2006	Dinamo București	101	(30)
2006–2007	Politehnica Timișoara	20	(2)
2007–2013	Rapid București	136	(13)
2013	Apollon Limassol	8	(0)
2014	FC Brașov	26	(5)
2015	Concordia Chiajna	11	(1)
2015	CSMS Iași	18	(1)
2016–2017	FC Brașov	31	(8)
2017	UTA Arad	1	(0)
Total		419	(68)

International career
1998	Romania U16	2	(0)
1999–2000	Romania U18	3	(0)
2000–2002	Romania U21	18	(5)
2003–2006	Romania	2	(0)

Managerial career
- 2018–2019: Rapid București (youth)
- 2018–2019: Rapid București (assistant)
- 2019: Rapid București U19 (manager)
- 2020: Rapid București (assistant)
- 2020–2021: Rapid București (assistant)
- 2021–2022: CSM Reșița (assistant)
- 2022–2023: FC Brașov (assistant)
- 2023: Botoșani (assistant)
- 2024–2025: Tunari (assistant)
- 2025–: Politehnica Timișoara (assistant)
- * Club domestic league appearances and goals

Ștefan Costel Grigorie (born 31 January 1982) is a Romanian former professional footballer who played as a midfielder, currently assistant coach at Liga III club Politehnica Timișoara.

== Club career ==
Grigorie was born on 31 January 1982 in Segarcea, Romania. He began his career at Universitatea Craiova, making his Divizia A debut on 2 June 1999 under coach Marian Bondrea in a 1–0 loss to CSM Reșița. He was loaned for half a year in 2000 at neighboring team Electro in Divizia B. Subsequently, he returned to Universitatea with whom he reached the 2000 Cupa României final, being sent by coach Emil Săndoi in the 57th minute to replace Ionuț Dragomir in the 2–0 loss to Dinamo București. He made his European competitions debut in the 2001 Intertoto Cup, scoring five goals in four appearances.

In 2002 when Craiova owner Gheorghe Nețoiu left the team to go to Dinamo București, he took players Grigorie, Dan Alexa, Flavius Stoican, Ovidiu Burcă, Ciprian Danciu, Ștefan Preda, Cornel Frăsineanu and Cosmin Bărcăuan with him. He helped the club win the 2003–04 title, being used by coach Ioan Andone in 25 matches in which he scored eight goals, including the winning goal in a 2–1 derby victory against Steaua București. Grigorie also won three Cupa României, playing in all the finals, scoring the only goal in the 2005 final against Farul Constanța. Subsequently, he won the 2005 Supercupa României, playing the entire match under Andone in the 3–2 victory against Steaua. He also had some European achievements with Dinamo, such as getting past Shakhtar Donetsk in the 2003–04 UEFA Cup. In the 2005–06 edition of the same competition, he helped the team eliminate Everton with a historical 5–2 win on aggregate, reaching the group stage. During his four seasons spent with The Red Dogs, Grigorie developed an appetite for goals, scoring 30 goals in 101 Divizia A matches.

In the summer of 2006, Politehnica Timișoara bought him and Dan Alexa from Dinamo He spent only one season with Politehnica, failing to accommodate, being transferred to Rapid București in exchange for Ionel Ganea. Grigorie's first performance with The Railwaymen was the winning of the 2007 Supercupa României, playing under coach Cristiano Bergodi in the first half, but being replaced with Romeo Stancu for the second, in the penalty shoot-out victory against his former team, Dinamo. Under the guidance of coach Răzvan Lucescu, he helped the team eliminate Śląsk Wrocław with 4–2 on aggregate in the play-offs of the 2010–11 Europa League, reaching the group stage of the competition. Grigorie spent six seasons at Rapid, playing a total of 136 Divizia A matches, scoring 13 goals.

In 2013, Grigorie had his first and only experience outside Romania, playing half a year in the Cypriot First Division at Apollon Limassol. Afterwards he returned to play in Divizia A for three and a half years at FC Brașov, Concordia Chiajna and CSMS Iași. He ended his career in 2017, after spending two seasons in Liga II at FC Brașov and UTA Arad. Grigorie has a total of 368 Divizia A matches with 59 goals and 38 appearances with five goals in European competitions (including four appearances with five goals in the Intertoto Cup).

== International career ==
Grigorie played two friendly games for Romania, making his debut on 12 February 2003, when coach Anghel Iordănescu sent him in the 82nd minute to replace Mirel Rădoi in a 2–1 win over Slovakia. His second appearance for the national team was under coach Victor Pițurcă on 16 August 2006 in a 2–0 victory against Cyprus.

== Career statistics ==
Appearances and goals by national team and year
National team	Year	Apps	Goals
Romania	2003	1	0
Romania	2004	0	0
Romania	2005	0	0
Romania	2006	1	0
Total		2	0

== Honours ==
Universitatea Craiova

- Cupa României runner-up: 1999–2000

Dinamo București

- Divizia A: 2003–04
- Cupa României: 2002–03, 2003–04, 2004–05
- Supercupa României: 2005

Rapid București

- Supercupa României: 2007
