= Grégory Delwarte =

Belgian footballer

Personal information
- Date of birth: 30 January 1978 (age 48)
- Place of birth: Chapelle-lez-Herlaimont, Belgium
- Height: 1.83 m (6 ft 0 in)
- Position: Goalkeeper

Youth career
- 1985–1987: Le Roeulx
- 1987–1988: Écaussinnes
- 1988–1990: RWD Molenbeek
- 1990–1994: Sporting Charleroi
- 1994–1996: La Louviére

Senior career*
Years	Team	Apps	(Gls)
1996–1997	Chapelle-Godarfontaine	2	(0)
1997–2000	Roda JC	16	(0)
2000–2001	Maasmechelen	30	(2)
2001–2003	Mons	36	(0)
2003–2004	Dinamo București	10	(0)
2004	Denderleeuw	9	(0)
2005–2006	Boussu Dour Borinage	40	(0)
2006–2008	Tournai	52	(0)
2008–2009	Mons	2	(0)
2009–2010	Oostende	50	(0)
2010–2013	La Louvière Centre	41	(0)
2013–2016	RES Acrenoise		
2018–2020	Pont-à-Celles-Buzet		
- * Club domestic league appearances and goals

Grégory Delwarte (born 30 January 1978) is a Belgian former professional footballer who played as a goalkeeper.

== Career ==
Delwarte played three seasons for Roda JC in the Dutch Eredivisie. After one season with Maasmechelen, he signed with Mons in 2001 and Dinamo București in 2003. He returned to Belgium the following year, and played for various clubs in the lower tiers. In July 2008, he returned to Mons where he signed a one-year deal. He was, however, sidelined by manager Philippe Saint-Jean due to having long hair.

He managed RES Acrenoise for two years after leaving the club as a player in 2016. He then played for Pont-à-Celles-Buzet from 2018 to 2020.

== Honours ==
Dinamo București

- Liga I: 2003–04
- Cupa României: 2003–04

Tournai

- Belgian Third Division: 2006–07
