= Bobi Verdeș =

Romanian footballer and manager

Personal information
- Full name: Bobi Gheorghiță Verdeș
- Date of birth: 24 November 1980 (age 45)
- Place of birth: Drobeta-Turnu Severin, Romania
- Height: 1.84 m (6 ft 0 in)
- Position: Striker

Team information
- Current team: Concordia Chiajna (assistant)

Youth career
- –1996: Drobeta-Turnu Severin

Senior career*
Years	Team	Apps	(Gls)
1996–1999	Drobeta-Turnu Severin		
1999–2001	Pandurii Târgu Jiu	28	(3)
2001–2003	Universitatea Craiova	30	(4)
2003	Național București	12	(1)
2004	Oțelul Galați	5	(0)
2004	Argeș Pitești	2	(0)
2005	Dacia Mioveni	1	(1)
2005	Pandurii Târgu Jiu	5	(0)
2006–2007	FCM Bacău	43	(10)
2007–2008	Inter Gaz București	22	(12)
2008–2009	Unirea Alba Iulia	36	(7)
2010	Minerul Mehedinți		
2010–2013	Chindia Târgoviște	48	(15)
2013	Gloria Buzău	13	(10)
2014	ASA Târgu Mureș	14	(5)
2014–2016	Inter Olt Slatina	32	(16)
2016	Sporting Turnu Măgurele		
2016–2017	Afumați	17	(4)
2017–2018	Flacăra Horezu		
2018–2019	CSM Slatina		
Total		308+	(88+)

Managerial career
- 2015–2016: Inter Olt Slatina (player/assistant)
- 2017–2018: Flacăra Horezu (player/assistant)
- 2018–2019: Slatina (player/coach)
- 2019–2020: Vedița Colonești
- 2021: FC U Craiova (assistant)
- 2022: Dinamo București (assistant)
- 2022: Mioveni (assistant)
- 2023: Botoșani (assistant)
- 2025: Gloria Buzău (assistant)
- 2026–: Concordia Chiajna (assistant)
- * Club domestic league appearances and goals

Bobi Gheorghiță Verdeș (born 24 November 1980) is a Romanian professional football manager and former player, currently assistant coach at Liga II club Concordia Chiajna.

== Honours ==
=== Player ===
Pandurii Târgu Jiu

- Divizia C: 1999–2000

Oțelul Galați

- Cupa României runner-up: 2003–04

Unirea Alba Iulia

- Liga II: 2008–09

Chindia Târgoviște

- Liga III: 2010–11

Flacăra Horezu

- Liga IV – Vâlcea County: 2017–18

CSM Slatina

- Liga IV – Olt County: 2017–18

=== Coach ===
CSM Slatina

- Liga IV – Olt County: 2017–18
