= 2003–04 Divizia A =

86th season of top-tier football league in Romania

Divizia A
- Season: 2003–04
- Champions: Dinamo București
- Relegated: Ceahlăul Piatra Neamț; Petrolul Ploiești; FC Oradea
- Champions League: Dinamo București
- UEFA Cup: Steaua București; Oțelul Galați
- Intertoto Cup: Gloria Bistrița
- Matches: 240
- Goals: 633 (2.64 per match)
- Top goalscorer: Ionel Dănciulescu (21)
- Biggest home win: Dinamo 7–0 Ceahlăul
- Biggest away win: Politehnica 0–8 Steaua
- Highest scoring: Dinamo 7–3 Bacău
- Longest winning run: Dinamo (8)
- Longest unbeaten run: Steaua (14)
- Longest losing run: Național (6)

The 2003–04 Divizia A was the eighty-sixth season of Divizia A, the top-level football league of Romania. Season began in August 2003 and ended in June 2004. Dinamo București became champions on 3 June 2004.

== Team changes ==
=== Relegated ===
The teams that were relegated to Divizia B at the end of the previous season (note that although Oțelul Galați lost the relegation play–off, they remained in Divizia A, after they bought the first division place from the promoted team Petrolul Ploiești, which merged with Astra Ploiești):

- Sportul Studențesc
- UTA Arad

=== Promoted ===
The teams that were promoted from Divizia B at the start of the season:

- Petrolul Ploiești
- Apulum Alba Iulia
- FC Oradea

=== Venues ===
Poli AEK Timișoara	Steaua București	Universitatea Craiova	Rapid București
Dan Păltinișanu	Steaua	Ion Oblemenco	Giulești-Valentin Stănescu
Capacity: 32,972	Capacity: 28,365	Capacity: 25,252	Capacity: 19,100
Apulum Alba Iulia	FCM Bacău	Farul Constanța	Dinamo București
Victoria-Cetate	Dumitru Sechelariu	Gheorghe Hagi	Dinamo
Capacity: 18,000	Capacity: 17,500	Capacity: 15,520	Capacity: 15,032
Argeș Pitești	2003–04 Divizia A (Romania) Location of Bucharest teams.		FC Oradea
Nicolae Dobrin	2003–04 Divizia A (Romania) Location of Bucharest teams.		Municipal
Capacity: 15,000	2003–04 Divizia A (Romania) Location of Bucharest teams.		Capacity: 15,000 (Note: Capacity of Municipal Stadium has been reduced from 18,000 to 15,000 due to advanced degradation of the resistance structure of the Second Stand.)
Național București	2003–04 Divizia A (Romania) Location of Bucharest teams.		Oțelul Galați
Cotroceni	2003–04 Divizia A (Romania) Location of Bucharest teams.		Oțelul
Capacity: 14,542	2003–04 Divizia A (Romania) Location of Bucharest teams.		Capacity: 13,500
Ceahlăul Piatra Neamț	FC Brașov	Gloria Bistrița	Petrolul Ploiești
Ceahlăul	Tineretului	Gloria	Astra
Capacity: 12,500	Capacity: 10,000	Capacity: 7,800	Capacity: 7,000

=== Personnel and kits ===
Team	Head coach	Captain	Kit manufacturer	Shirt Sponsor
Apulum Alba Iulia	(Romania) Alexandru Pelici	(Romania) Alin Paleacu	Lotto / Joma	Bergenbier, Elit
Argeș Pitești	(Romania) Ion Moldovan	(Romania) Dănuț Coman	Erreà	Pic
Brașov	(Romania) Răzvan Lucescu	(Romania) Mihai Stere	Nexo / Joma	Prescon
Ceahlăul Piatra Neamț	(Romania) Marius Lăcătuș	(Romania) Radu Lefter	Erreà	Rifil, Romalfa
Dinamo București	(Romania) Ioan Andone	(Romania) Florentin Petre	Lotto	Omniasig
Farul Constanța	(Romania) Marin Ion	(Romania) George Curcă	Lotto	SNC
FC Oradea	(Romania) Zsolt Muzsnay	(Romania) Bogdan Vrăjitoarea	Erreà	—
Universitatea Craiova	(Romania) Mircea Rednic	(Romania) Corneliu Papură	Erreà	Golden Brau
FCM Bacău	(Romania) Ionuț Lupescu	(Romania) Florin Prunea	Legea	Letea, Sonoma
Gloria Bistrița	(Romania) Remus Vlad	(Romania) Cristian Coroian	Erreà	Darimex
Național București	(Romania) Cosmin Olăroiu	(Romania) Petre Marin	Nike	Vincon Vrancea
Oțelul Galați	(Romania) Sorin Cârțu	(Romania) Sorin Ghionea	Lotto	Ispat Sidex
Petrolul Ploiești	(Romania) Florin Marin	(Romania) Daniel Petroesc	Lotto	Petrom, InterAgro
Poli AEK Timișoara	(Romania) Basarab Panduru	(Romania) Romulus Buia	Lotto	Luxten
Rapid București	(Romania) Viorel Hizo	(Romania) Vasile Maftei	Erreà	LaDorna
Steaua București	(Romania) Victor Pițurcă	(Romania) Mirel Rădoi	Nike	—

== League table ==
Pos	Team	Pld	W	D	L	GF	GA	GD	Pts	Qualification or relegation
1	Dinamo București (C)	30	22	4	4	71	30	+41	70	Qualification to Champions League second qualifying round
2	Steaua București	30	18	10	2	60	20	+40	64	Qualification to UEFA Cup second qualifying round
3	Rapid București	30	16	7	7	51	32	+19	55	
4	Universitatea Craiova	30	11	11	8	38	34	+4	44	
5	Oțelul Galați	30	10	13	7	30	26	+4	43	Qualification to UEFA Cup first qualifying round
6	Apulum Alba Iulia	30	11	8	11	32	47	−15	41	
7	Național București	30	11	6	13	36	39	−3	39 (Note: TIM 0-0 PRO; PRO 0-0 TIM)	
8	Politehnica AEK Timișoara	30	9	12	9	30	40	−10	39	
9	Farul Constanța	30	9	10	11	39	42	−3	37	
10	Argeș Pitești	30	9	9	12	31	35	−4	36 (Note: ARG 2-0 BRA; BRA 1-2 ARG)	
11	Brașov	30	10	6	14	40	42	−2	36	
12	Gloria Bistrița	30	9	8	13	36	48	−12	35	Qualification to Intertoto Cup first round
13	FCM Bacău	30	7	10	13	29	43	−14	31	
14	Ceahlăul Piatra Neamț (R)	30	7	9	14	34	50	−16	30	Relegation to Divizia B
15	Petrolul Ploiești (R)	30	6	9	15	38	55	−17	27	Relegation to Divizia B
16	FC Oradea (R)	30	6	6	18	38	50	−12	24	Relegation to Divizia B

Source: LT (in Romanian)
Rules for classification: 1) points; 2) head-to-head points; 3) head-to-head goal difference; 4) head-to-head goals scored; 5) goal difference; 6) number of goals scored.
(C) Champions; (R) Relegated

=== Positions by round ===
Team ╲ Round	1	2	3	4	5	6	7	8	9	10	11	12	13	14	15	16	17	18	19	20	21	22	23	24	25	26	27	28	29	30
Apulum Alba Iulia	9	3	9	14	9	10	6	4	3	4	4	4	5	8	5	7	8	7	8	6	6	6	7	6	5	6	6	7	7	6
Argeș Pitești	5	6	5	3	2	4	7	6	6	6	8	12	14	9	12	14	15	15	15	15	16	15	15	13	13	10	12	11	8	10
Bacău	15	16	7	9	5	9	9	10	11	15	11	14	13	15	11	12	10	11	11	12	12	14	14	15	15	15	14	14	13	13
Brașov	16	8	13	12	13	6	4	7	8	11	14	11	11	13	10	11	12	13	13	14	14	13	11	11	10	11	10	9	11	11
Ceahlăul Piatra Neamț	2	2	1	4	6	11	12	14	15	10	13	10	10	12	15	16	13	14	12	10	11	11	12	12	12	12	13	13	14	14
Universitatea Craiova	6	4	3	5	4	7	11	11	10	9	7	5	4	4	4	4	6	8	7	5	4	4	4	4	4	4	4	4	4	4
Dinamo București	11	7	12	6	7	3	2	2	2	2	3	2	2	2	1	1	1	1	1	1	2	1	1	1	1	1	1	1	1	1
Farul Constanța	13	15	16	11	12	15	15	16	12	13	9	13	7	10	8	9	11	10	10	11	10	9	10	9	9	9	9	12	9	9
Gloria Bistrița	3	5	11	7	8	5	8	5	5	5	6	9	12	14	13	10	9	9	9	9	9	10	9	10	11	13	11	10	12	12
Oradea	7	13	15	16	16	14	10	12	14	16	16	15	16	11	14	15	16	16	16	16	15	16	16	16	16	16	16	16	16	16
Oțelul Galați	12	14	6	13	14	8	5	8	7	7	5	6	6	5	6	8	5	5	6	8	8	8	8	8	8	8	7	5	5	5
Petrolul Ploiești	14	10	8	10	15	16	16	15	16	12	15	16	15	16	16	13	14	12	14	13	13	12	13	14	14	14	15	15	15	15
Național București	4	9	14	15	11	13	14	9	9	8	12	8	8	6	9	6	4	4	4	4	5	5	5	5	6	7	8	8	10	7
Rapid București	8	11	4	2	3	2	3	3	4	3	2	3	3	3	3	3	3	3	3	3	3	3	3	3	3	3	3	3	3	3
Steaua București	1	1	2	1	1	1	1	1	1	1	1	1	1	1	2	2	2	2	2	2	1	2	2	2	2	2	2	2	2	2
Politehnica AEK Timișoara	10	12	10	8	10	12	13	13	13	14	10	7	9	7	7	5	7	6	5	7	7	7	6	7	7	5	5	6	6	8

Source: LT (in Romanian)

=== Results ===
Home \ Away	AAI	ARG	BAC	FCO	BRA	CEA	FCU	DIN	FAR	GBI	OȚE	PET	NAT	RAP	STE	TIM
Apulum Alba Iulia	—	1–5	2–0	0–1	3–2	2–2	0–1	0–0	0–0	1–0	2–1	4–2	1–0	0–4	0–0	0–0
Argeș Pitești	0–0	—	1–0	2–0	2–1	0–1	2–1	1–0	1–1	2–0	0–0	0–0	4–1	0–2	0–0	1–1
Bacău	0–1	2–1	—	0–0	0–0	4–1	0–0	4–3	0–3	1–0	1–0	2–2	2–1	2–1	0–0	0–1
Brașov	2–0	1–2	2–2	—	0–0	2–3	3–4	2–0	3–0	2–1	0–1	4–1	4–1	2–0	0–1	0–3
Ceahlăul Piatra Neamț	3–0	4–1	1–0	0–3	—	2–2	0–0	2–1	3–1	2–4	1–1	4–1	1–4	1–2	1–1	2–0
Universitatea Craiova	0–0	0–0	0–0	2–2	2–0	—	0–1	1–0	3–0	4–1	1–1	5–1	1–0	3–1	1–1	0–0
Dinamo București	5–1	3–0	7–3	1–0	7–0	2–1	—	3–2	3–0	1–0	2–0	5–0	4–1	3–4	2–1	4–2
Farul Constanța	3–0	1–0	1–0	1–1	1–1	3–0	1–2	—	2–2	3–2	1–1	1–0	1–2	1–1	2–1	1–0
Gloria Bistrița	0–1	3–2	2–0	1–3	2–0	1–0	1–1	1–1	—	2–1	0–1	1–3	3–2	2–2	0–2	1–1
Oradea	1–2	2–1	3–0	2–2	2–1	0–1	2–3	5–1	1–3	—	1–1	0–0	0–0	1–1	0–3	2–3
Oțelul Galați	3–0	1–1	2–2	2–1	1–1	0–1	0–0	2–1	1–0	1–0	—	0–0	1–1	0–1	2–2	4–1
Petrolul Ploiești	0–2	1–0	3–1	5–0	5–1	1–1	0–1	2–2	2–5	1–1	0–1	—	1–1	0–2	1–1	3–2
Național București	2–3	1–1	2–1	1–0	1–0	3–0	2–0	2–0	2–0	2–3	1–2	2–1	—	0–2	0–1	0–0
Rapid București	2–2	1–0	1–1	1–0	1–0	3–1	2–3	2–3	3–0	2–1	2–0	2–0	0–1	—	1–1	2–0
Steaua București	4–1	4–0	1–0	4–0	2–0	2–0	1–0	2–2	4–1	2–1	2–0	2–1	2–0	3–3	—	2–0
Politehnica AEK Timișoara	4–3	2–1	1–1	1–0	0–0	1–1	1–2	0–0	0–0	2–1	0–0	2–1	0–0	1–0	0–8	—

Source: LT (in Romanian)
Legend: Blue = home team win; Yellow = draw; Red = away team win.

== Attendances ==
Pos	Team	Total	High	Low	Average	Change
1	Politehnica Timișoara	349,000	40,000	12,000	23,266	+7.7%
2	Steaua București	180,000	25,000	3,000	12,000	+26.5%
3	Universitatea Craiova	179,200	25,000	700	11,946	−36.0%
4	Rapid București	127,500	20,000	2,000	8,500	−18.8%
5	FC Oradea	116,000	15,000	1,500	8,285	n/a^{1}
6	Apulum Alba Iulia	122,000	22,000	2,000	8,133	n/a^{1}
7	Dinamo București	115,000	20,000	2,000	7,666	+32.2%
8	Oțelul Galați	96,500	13,000	2,000	6,433	+2.7%
9	FCM Bacău	92,500	19,000	1,000	6,166	−22.9%
10	FC Brașov	70,000	12,000	1,500	4,666	−2.1%
11	Argeș Pitești	59,200	12,000	200	3,946	−7.5%
12	Farul Constanța	57,900	12,000	200	3,860	−21.8%
13	Ceahlăul Piatra Neamț	57,000	12,000	1,000	3,800	+8.1%
14	Gloria Bistrița	40,350	15,000	200	2,690	−16.1%
15	Petrolul Ploiești	40,100	8,000	500	2,673	n/a^{1,3}
16	Național București	33,900	8,000	100	2,260	−43.6%
	League total	1,736,150	40,000	100	7,264	−2.3%

Updated to games played on 16 August 2019
Source: League matches: Divizia A 2003/2004
Notes:
1: Played last season in Divizia B.
2: Rapid București played 7 matches out of their stadium.
3: Petrolul Ploiești played 14 matches out of their stadium.

== Top goalscorers ==
Position	Player	Club	Goals
1	Ionel Dănciulescu	Dinamo București	21
2	Nicolae Dică	Argeș Pitești / Steaua București	18
3	Claudiu Niculescu	Dinamo București	16
4	Bogdan Vrăjitoarea	FC Oradea	14
5	Sabin Ilie	Rapid București	13
5	Adrian Neaga	Steaua București	13

== Champion squad ==
Dinamo București

Goalkeepers: Grégory Delwarte (Belgium) (10 / 0); Uladzimir Hayew (Belarus) (2 / 0); Cristian Munteanu (9 / 0); Ștefan Preda (11 / 0).
Defenders: Angelo Alistar (11 / 0); Cosmin Bărcăuan (27 / 4); Mugur Bolohan (1 / 0); Ovidiu Burcă (22 / 0); Adrian Iordache (25 / 2); Xavier Méride (France) (6 / 0); Samuel Okunowo (Nigeria) (2 / 0); Szabolcs Perenyi (15 / 0); Flavius Stoican (8 / 1); Dorin Semeghin (28 / 1).
Midfielders: Dan Alexa (23 / 1); Ionuț Badea (16 / 0); Cristian Cigan (1 / 0); Cristian Ciubotariu (6 / 0); Alexandru Dragomir (1 / 0); Ștefan Grigorie (24 / 8); Sorin Iodi (1 / 0); Vlad Munteanu (18 / 2); Leonard Naidin (8 / 0); Florentin Petre (24 / 4); Iulian Tameș (26 / 1); Ianis Zicu (13 / 6).
Forwards: Ionel Dănciulescu (29 / 21); Claudiu Drăgan (8 / 0); Ciprian Marica (10 / 3); Claudiu Niculescu (28 / 16).
(league appearances and goals listed in brackets)

Manager: Ioan Andone.
