= Alin Mircea Savu =

Romanian footballer

Alin Savu
Personal information
- Full name: Alin Mircea Savu
- Date of birth: 29 November 1977 (age 48)
- Place of birth: Râmnicu Vâlcea, Romania
- Height: 1.80 m (5 ft 11 in)
- Position: Midfielder

Senior career*
Years	Team	Apps	(Gls)
1994–1995	FC Vâlcea	24	(0)
1996	Unirea Drăgăşani		
1996–1997	Rapid București	8	(0)
1997–1998	Rocar București	7	(0)
1998–2000	CSM Reșița	36	(3)
2000–2003	Petrolul Ploieşti	81	(21)
2003	Digenis Morphou	11	(0)
2004	Politehnica Iași	11	(3)
2004–2005	Inter Gaz București	30	(9)
2005–2006	CSM Râmnicu Vâlcea	21	(4)
2006–2008	Universitatea Cluj	15	(5)
- * Club domestic league appearances and goals

Alin Mircea Savu (born 29 November 1977) is a former Romanian football player.
