= Vlad Munteanu =

Romanian footballer (born 1981)

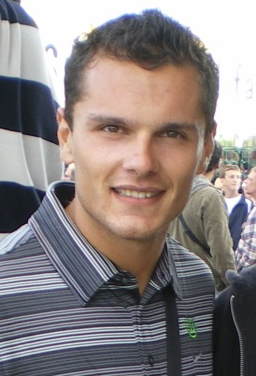

Personal information
- Full name: Vlad Ioan Munteanu
- Date of birth: 16 January 1981 (age 45)
- Place of birth: Bacău, Romania
- Height: 1.82 m (6 ft 0 in)
- Position: Midfielder

Youth career
- –1999: SC Bacău

Senior career*
Years	Team	Apps	(Gls)
1999–2000	FCM Bacău	39	(7)
2000–2006	Dinamo București	94	(11)
2001–2002	→ Poiana Câmpina (loan)	3	(2)
2004–2005	→ Național București (loan)	14	(1)
2006–2007	Energie Cottbus	33	(11)
2007–2011	VfL Wolfsburg	10	(0)
2009–2010	VfL Wolfsburg II	5	(1)
2008	→ Auxerre (loan)	9	(0)
2009	→ Arminia Bielefeld (loan)	15	(2)
2010	→ FSV Frankfurt (loan)	12	(0)
2011	Dinamo București	4	(0)
2011–2012	Concordia Chiajna	21	(1)
2012–2013	Erzgebirge Aue	7	(0)
Total		266	(36)

International career
2002	Romania	1	(0)
- * Club domestic league appearances and goals

Vlad Ioan Munteanu (born 16 January 1981) is a Romanian former professional footballer who played as a midfielder.

== Club career ==
=== FCM Bacău ===
Munteanu was born on 16 January 1981 in Bacău, Romania. He began playing football at local club FCM Bacău where he made his Divizia A debut on 6 March 1999 under coach Florin Halagian in a 2–0 home victory against Astra Ploiești. He scored his first goal in the competition about one week later in a 1–0 win over Universitatea Craiova.

=== Dinamo București ===
After two seasons with FCM, he spent six seasons at Dinamo București. There, he won the only trophies of his career and made his only appearances in European competitions, playing a total of 10 UEFA Cup matches and scoring two goals. His first performance was winning the 2000–01 Cupa României, even though coach Cornel Dinu did not use him in the final. In the following season, Munteanu helped Dinamo win the title under coaches Dinu and Marin Ion who gave him 19 appearances in which he scored five goals. During the same season he played a few games in the second league at Poiana Câmpina, then a satellite team of Dinamo. His next trophy won with The Red Dogs was the 2002–03 Cupa României, as coach Ioan Andone sent him in the 90+2 minute to replace Florentin Petre in the 1–0 victory against Național București in the final. In the 2003–04 season, Munteanu helped the club win The Double, appearing in 18 league games under Andone and scoring one goal. He was again a substitute in the Cupa României final, entering in the 55th minute to replace Ionuț Badea, and then opening the scoring approximately 10 minutes later in their 2–0 victory against Oțelul Galați. He also provided two perfect assists for goals by Claudiu Niculescu and Ianis Zicu in the 2–0 home victory against Shakhtar Donetsk, which helped them eliminate the Ukrainians in the UEFA Cup. After playing only a few games in the first half of the 2004–05 season, Andone informed Munteanu that he would not be part of his plans for the rest of the season, leading to a loan to Național București. He returned to Dinamo for the 2005–06 season. Andone used him as a starter until the 69th minute, when he replaced him with Ianis Zicu in the 3–2 victory against rivals Steaua București that earned them their first Supercupa României. In the 2005–06 UEFA Cup campaign, the team eliminated Omonia Nicosia against whom Munteanu scored a goal, and Everton with a historical 5–2 on aggregate, reaching the group stage. There, the campaign ended but he scored the only goal of a 1–0 victory against title holders CSKA Moscow. During these years, he scored two league goals in the derby against Steaua which helped his side earn two draws, also netting two times in two victories in the Cupa României.

=== Energie Cottbus ===
In 2006, Munteanu signed with Energie Cottbus of the German Bundesliga. He made his league debut on 12 August 2006 when coach Petrik Sander used him as a starter in a 2–0 away loss to Borussia Mönchengladbach. In the next round, he scored his first goal in a 2–2 draw against Hamburg. Munteanu netted a personal record of 11 goals by the end of the 2006–07 season, including a double in a 3–2 away win over Borussia Dortmund. He formed a partnership in the team's offence with fellow Romanian Sergiu Radu and they were nicknamed "The Twins of the Goal" by the German press. With Munteanu's 11 goals and as Radu found the net 14 times, together they scored over half of the total 38 goals netted by the team that helped it avoid relegation.

=== VfL Wolfsburg and loans ===
In the summer of 2007, VfL Wolfsburg transferred him and Radu, paying €4.5 million for them, of which €1.5 million was for Munteanu. After being used in the first half of the 2007–08 season by coach Felix Magath in 10 league games, Munteanu was sent on loan in the second half to French side Auxerre under coach Jean Fernandez to play alongside compatriots Daniel Niculae and Gabriel Tamaș. He made his Ligue 1 debut on 9 February 2008 when coach Fernandez sent him in the 90th minute to replace Kévin Lejeune in a 2–1 away victory against Rennes. After only 12 appearances in all competitions, Munteanu returned to Wolfsburg, claiming he had problems adapting to French football's reliance on physical strength. Having been excluded from Magath's plans for The Wolves in the 2008–09 season, playing only for the club's satellite in the fourth division, he was loaned for the second half of the season to Arminia Bielefeld. There, on 23 May 2009 he made his last Bundesliga appearance in a 2–2 draw against Hannover 96, totaling 58 matches with 13 goals in the competition. The following season, Munteanu began by playing for Wolfsburg's satellite team in the first half, before being loaned to 2. Bundesliga club FSV Frankfurt for the second half.

=== Late career ===
In January 2011, he ended his contract with Wolfsburg and signed a deal with his old club, Dinamo, for six months. Afterwards he went to play for the 2011–12 season at Concordia Chiajna where he made his last Liga I appearance on 9 May 2012 in a 3–1 victory against Pandurii Târgu Jiu, totaling 172 matches with 19 goals in the competition. In 2013, after one season spent at 2. Bundesliga side Erzgebirge Aue in which he made six appearances, Munteanu retired at age 32.

== International career ==
Munteanu played one match for Romania on 21 August 2002 when coach Anghel Iordănescu sent him in the 79th minute to replace Paul Codrea in a 1–0 friendly loss to Greece. In 2007, during his prolific season spent at Energie Cottbus together with Sergiu Radu, the Romanian press insisted that they should be called-up for the national team but coach Victor Pițurcă did not agree, stating about the Bundesliga championship:"It's not what it once was! The clubs are at a low level and the players are of average value."

== Personal life ==
Munteanu's father, Ion, was also a footballer who played for FCM Bacău and Universitatea Cluj and had over 250 Divizia A appearances in which he scored 60 goals.

== Honors ==
Dinamo București

- Divizia A: 2001–02, 2003–04
- Cupa României: 2000–01, 2002–03, 2003–04
- Supercupa României: 2005

VfL Wolfsburg

- Bundesliga: 2008–09
