= Dorin Semeghin =

Romanian footballer

Personal information
- Full name: Dorin Constantin Semeghin
- Date of birth: 29 March 1979 (age 47)
- Place of birth: Gura Humorului, Suceava County, Romania
- Height: 1.69 m (5 ft 7 in)
- Position: Left back

Youth career
- LPS Suceava

Senior career*
Years	Team	Apps	(Gls)
1997	Foresta II Fălticeni	9	(2)
1997–2001	Foresta Fălticeni	93	(3)
2001–2006	Dinamo București	59	(2)
2002	→ Poiana Câmpina (loan)	1	(1)
2002–2003	→ Petrolul Ploieşti (loan)	10	(0)
2003	→ Argeş Piteşti (loan)	14	(0)
2005	→ Dinamo II București	12	(1)
2006	Hapoel Petah Tikva	10	(0)
2006–2008	Oțelul Galați	60	(1)
2008–2009	Gaz Metan Mediaş	9	(0)
2009	Cetatea Suceava	9	(0)
2010	Astra Ploieşti	3	(0)
2010–2011	Gloria Buzău	11	(0)
2011–2017	Foresta Suceava	126	(3)
Total		426	(13)

Managerial career
- 2015–2016: Rapid CFR Suceava (assistant)
Medal record
Dinamo București
Winner	Divizia A	2001–02
Winner	Divizia A	2003–04
Runner-up	Divizia A	2004–05
Winner	Romanian Cup	2003
Winner	Romanian Cup	2004
Winner	Romanian Cup	2005
Foresta Suceava
Winner	Liga III	2011–12
- * Club domestic league appearances and goals as of 22 March 2018

Dorin Constantin Semeghin (born 29 March 1979) is a Romanian former footballer who played as a left back.

== Club career ==
Born in Gura Humorului, Suceava County, Semeghin started his career at LPS Suceava, then at senior level he played in 102 matches for Foresta Fălticeni before the 2001 transfer to Dinamo București. As a curiosity, he made his Liga I debut on 22 November 1997 for Foresta Fălticeni, in a 0–2 defeat exactly against Dinamo București. For Dinamo Dorin played in 59 matches, won two Romanian titles, three Romanian Cups and played in UEFA Champions League. After the breakup of Dinamo, Semeghin has continued to play for years in the Liga I for clubs such as: Oțelul Galați (for which he played in UEFA Cup and UEFA Intertoto Cup), Gaz Metan Mediaş or Astra Ploieşti. In 2011 he returned home and helped at the Liga II promotion of his hometown new main team, Rapid CFR Suceava. He played for Rapid CFR in 126 matches and scored 3 goals, the club changed its name in Foresta, in the summer of 2016 to return to the forefront the name of the team that made performance in the 90's and to which Semeghin debuted, Foresta Fălticeni. In fact Semeghin played for the Suceava teams in 237 matches, whether they were called: Foresta Fălticeni, Cetatea Suceava, Rapid CFR or Foresta Suceava. Outside Romania he played for a half season in Israel, at Hapoel Petah Tikva. Semenghin retired in the summer of 2017, at 38 years old.

== Manager career ==
Between 2015 and 2016 he was the assistant manager of Rapid CFR.

== Trivia ==
In May 2004, Semeghin was the protagonist of a car accident, entering with his car in the wall of Erbașu Hotel, from Bucharest. The informations that Semeghin had consumed alcohol have inspired the media which called him Semeghin, spaima sticlelor de vin ("Semeghin, the terror of the wine bottles"), nickname that brought him a bad reputation. In 2017, Semeghin would declare: "When I was younger I made mistakes, but that's life. Now, when I get older, my mind came to my head and I am very conscientious. There have been various allegations of alcohol, but I have not put my mouth on alcohol for almost nine years. It was a great exaggeration, and I was wrong when I was caught in a bad entourage. All the players did what I did, but I was the scapegoat. When we won two years in a row the championship it was no problem. When we were on the 8th place, everything was broken and I became the "favorite customer" of the fans." An additional argument of Semeghin's seriousness since 2007 has been his long career, being in a very good physical form also at 38 years old.

== Honours ==
=== Club ===
Dinamo București

- Romanian League Championship: 2001–02, 2003–04
- Romanian Cup: 2003, 2004, 2005

Foresta Suceava

- Liga III: 2011–12
