= 2003 Cupa României final =

- Event: 2002–03 Cupa României
| Dinamo București | Naţional București |
| Divizia A | Divizia A |
| 1 | 0 |
- Date: 31 May 2003
- Venue: Stadionul Naţional, Bucharest
- Referee: Alain Sars (France)
- Attendance: 25,000

The 2003 Cupa României final was the 65th final of Romania's most prestigious cup competition. The final was played at the Stadionul Naţional in Bucharest on 31 May 2003 and was contested between Divizia A sides Dinamo București and Naţional București. The cup was won by Dinamo.

== Route to the final ==
FC Dinamo București

| Round of 32 | UM Timişoara | 0–1 | Dinamo București |
| Round of 16 | Steaua București | 0–3 | Dinamo București |
| Quarter-finals 1st Leg | Farul Constanța | 0–1 | Dinamo București |
| Quarter-finals 2nd Leg | Dinamo București | 2–2 | Farul Constanța |
| Semi-finals 1st Leg | Astra Ploiești | 2–1 | Dinamo București |
| Semi-finals 2nd Leg | Dinamo București | 3–1 (aet, gg) | Astra Ploiești |

FC Naţional București

| Round of 32 | Progresul Caracal | 0–3 | Naţional București |
| Round of 16 | Naţional București | 3–0 | Midia Năvodari |
| Quarter-finals 1st Leg | Naţional București | 4–0 | CFR Cluj |
| Quarter-finals 2nd Leg | CFR Cluj | 0–1 | Naţional București |
| Semi-finals 1st Leg | Naţional București | 4–0 | Argeş Pitești |
| Semi-finals 2nd Leg | Argeş Pitești | 2–1 | Naţional București |

== Match details ==
31 May 2003
20:00 EEST

| Dinamo București | 1–0 | Naţional București |
|---|---|---|
| Tameş 30' | Report |

Stadionul Naţional, Bucharest
Attendance: 25,000
Referee: Alain Sars (France)

| Dinamo București | Naţional București |

DINAMO BUCUREŞTI:
| GK | 23 | (Romania) Daniel Tudor |
| DF | 3 | (Romania) Giani Kiriţă |
| DF | 6 | (Romania) Bogdan Onuț |
| DF | 30 | (Romania) Gabriel Tamaş | (substituted off) 71' |
| MF | 8 | (Romania) Florentin Petre (c) | (substituted off) 90+2' |
| MF | 21 | (Romania) Ştefan Grigorie | (substituted off) 74' |
| MF | 13 | (Romania) Dan Alexa |
| MF | 25 | (Romania) Iulian Tameş |
| MF | 16 | (Romania) Cornel Frăsineanu |
| FW | 10 | (Romania) Ionel Dănciulescu |
| FW | 24 | (Romania) Cosmin Bărcăuan |
Substitutes:
| DF | 4 | (Romania) Ovidiu Burcă | (substituted in) 71' |
| MF | 9 | (Romania) Viorel Domocoş | (substituted in) 74' |
| MF | 18 | (Romania) Vlad Munteanu | (substituted in) 90+2' |
Manager:
(Romania) Ioan Andone

NAŢIONAL BUCUREŞTI:
| GK | 99 | (Romania) Bogdan Vintilă |
| DF | 18 | (Romania) Cornel Buta |
| DF | 4 | (Romania) Tiberiu Curt |
| DF | 5 | (Romania) Flavius Moldovan |
| DF | 20 | (Romania) Petre Marin (c) |
| MF | 25 | (Romania) Stelian Carabaș | (substituted off) 46' |
| MF | 7 | (Romania) Dan Petrescu |
| MF | 21 | (Romania) Adrian Olah |
| MF | 28 | (Romania) Gigel Coman |
| FW | 8 | (Romania) Gabriel Caramarin | (substituted off) 89' |
| FW | 11 | (Bosnia and Herzegovina) Slaviša Mitrović |
Substitutes:
| FW | 29 | (Romania) Sergiu Radu | (substituted in) 46' |
| FW | 9 | (Romania) Victoraş Iacob | (substituted in) 89' |
| | –– |
Manager:
(Italy) Walter Zenga

MATCH OFFICIALS

- Assistant referees:
  - (France) Jean-Paul Chaudre
  - (France) Attilio Ugolini
- Fourth official:
  - (France) Thierry Auriac

MAN OF THE MATCH

MATCH RULES

- 90 minutes.
- 30 minutes extra-time (15-minute intervals)
- Penalty shoot-out if scores level after extra time.
- Seven named substitutes
- Maximum of 3 substitutions.
