= Iulian Tameș =

Romanian footballer

Personal information
- Date of birth: 6 December 1978 (age 47)
- Place of birth: Mizil, Romania
- Height: 1.71 m (5 ft 7 in)
- Position: Midfielder

Youth career
- –1998: Dinamo București

Senior career*
Years	Team	Apps	(Gls)
1998–2004	Dinamo București	114	(11)
1998	→ Rocar București (loan)	14	(3)
1999–2000	→ ARO Câmpulung (loan)	31	(6)
2005	Alania Vladikavkaz	3	(0)
2005–2006	Național București	9	(1)
2006	Dinamo București	15	(0)
2007–2010	Argeș Pitești	92	(26)
2010–2011	Politehnica Timișoara	29	(3)
2012	Dinamo București	8	(1)
2012	Brașov	16	(1)
2013–2015	SCM Pitești	17	(1)
2015–2016	Argeș 1953 Pitești		
2016–2017	Atletic Bradu	19	(4)
2017–2019	Unirea Bascov	43	(7)
2019	Muscelul Câmpulung	16	(6)
2020	Voința Budeasa	2	(0)
2021–2022	Vedița Colonești	1	(0)
Total		429	(70)

International career
2000–2009	Romania	5	(0)

Managerial career
- 2015–2016: Argeș 1953 Piteşti (player/assistant)
- 2016: Argeș 1953 Piteşti (player/coach)
- 2016–2017: Atletic Bradu (player/assistant)
- 2021–2022: Vedița Colonești (player/assistant)
- 2023: Unirea Bascov (assistant)
- 2023–2024: Mioveni (assistant)
- 2024: Voluntari (assistant)
- 2024–2026: CSM Slatina (assistant)
- 2026: Unirea Slobozia (assistant)
- * Club domestic league appearances and goals

Iulian Tameș (born 6 December 1978) is a Romanian football coach and a former player who played as a midfielder.

== Club career ==
=== Early career ===
Tameș started his career at Dinamo București where he played for seven years. He was a very important man for Dinamo in these years, scoring 10 goals and adding over 40 assists in 115 matches. In this period, he won two titles with Dinamo. He was loaned out to Rocar where scored three goals in 14 appearances. Tameș was loaned out again, this time at Aro making 31 appearances and scoring 6 goals.

In 2005, he signed with Alania, where play just three matches because he was not settled in Russian Championship. He returned to Romania this time at Național București where he impressed and after few months signed again with Dinamo.

Tameș returned to Dinamo and won another Championship playing 15 matches and adding 7 assists. In the summer signed with Argeș Pitești helping the team to a promotion in Liga I. Tameș played 91 matches and scored 31 goals, best form in his career, becoming a legend at FC Argeș.

=== Politehnica Timișoara ===
He signed a two-year contract with FC Timișoara on 27 May 2010. He made his debut in a 2–2 draw against Gloria Bistriţa. On 22 September 2010 he scored his first goal for Poli in 3–1 victory in Romanian Cup against Juventus București.

=== Return to Dinamo ===
In January 2012, Tameș returned to Dinamo, signing a contract for six months. At the end of this spell, his contract was not renewed, the player being released.

== International career ==
Tameș played five friendly games for Romania, making his debut on 16 August 2000 under coach László Bölöni, when he came as a substitute and replaced Constantin Gâlcă in the 75th minute of a 1–1 against Poland. His last appearance for the national team was on 11 February 2009, under coach Victor Pițurcă, when he came as a substitute and replaced Răzvan Cociș in the 81st minute of a 2–1 loss against Croatia.

== Career statistics ==
Appearances and goals by national team and year
National team	Year	Apps	Goals
Romania	2000	2	0
Romania	2001	1	0
Romania	2008	1	0
Romania	2009	1	0
Total		5	0

== Honours ==
=== Player ===
Dinamo București

- Liga I: 2001–02, 2003–04, 2006–07
- Cupa României: 2000–01, 2002–03, 2003–04, 2011–12
- Supercupa României runner-up: 2001, 2002, 2003

Național București

- Cupa României runner-up: 2005–06

Argeş Piteşti

- Liga II: 2007–08

Argeș 1953 Pitești

- Liga IV – Argeș County: 2015–16

Unirea Bascov

- Liga IV – Argeș County: 2017–18

Vedița Colonești

- Liga III: 2020–21
