= Decebal Gheară =

Romanian footballer

Personal information
- Full name: Decebal Virgil Nicolae Gheară
- Date of birth: 12 September 1978 (age 48)
- Place of birth: Hunedoara, Romania
- Height: 1.79 m (5 ft 10 in)
- Position: Centre back

Youth career
- Corvinul Hunedoara

Senior career*
Years	Team	Apps	(Gls)
1995–2003	Corvinul Hunedoara	106	(13)
1996–1998	→ Minerul Certej (loan)	?	(?)
2003–2005	Oțelul Galați	29	(2)
2005	Panachaiki	0	(0)
2006–2009	Farul Constanţa	53	(1)
2009	Delta Tulcea	5	(0)
2009–2010	Săgeata Stejaru	23	(1)
2010–2012	Săgeata Năvodari	17	(0)
Total		233	(17)
Medal record
Oțelul Galați
Runner-up	Romanian Cup	2004
- * Club domestic league appearances and goals as of 21 March 2018

Decebal Virgil Nicolae Gheară (born 12 September 1978), commonly known as Decebal Gheară, is a Romanian former professional footballer who played as a centre back. Gheară started his career at Corvinul Hunedoara football academy. At senior level he made his debut for Corvinul Hunedoara, but his Liga I debut was only on 20 September 2002 for Oțelul Galați, in 1–0 victory against Petrolul Ploiești. He also played in Romania for teams such as: Farul Constanţa, Delta Tulcea or Săgeata Năvodari and in Greece for Panachaiki.
