= Mircea Ilie =

Romanian footballer

Personal information
- Full name: Mircea Cătălin Ilie
- Date of birth: 5 March 1977 (age 49)
- Place of birth: Bucharest, Romania
- Height: 1.81 m (5 ft 11 in)
- Position: Striker

Senior career*
Years	Team	Apps	(Gls)
1999	Dinamo București	0	(0)
1999–2001	FC Oneşti	43	(16)
2001–2002	FCM Bacău	28	(2)
2002–2003	FC Oneşti	26	(8)
2003–2004	Oțelul Galați	14	(2)
2004	FCU Craiova	8	(0)
2004–2005	Pandurii Târgu Jiu	15	(6)
2005–2007	Ceahlăul Piatra Neamţ	50	(12)
2007–2009	UTA Arad	16	(2)
2009–2010	Jiul Petroșani	15	(4)
2010–2011	CF Brăila	5	(0)
2011–2013	FC Hunedoara		
Total		220+	(52)
Medal record
Oțelul Galați
Runner-up	Cupa României	2004
- * Club domestic league appearances and goals as of 2 January 2018

Mircea Cătălin Ilie (born 5 March 1977 in Bucharest, Romania) is a Romanian former football player who plays as a striker.
