= Ionuț Badea =

Romanian footballer

Ionuţ Badea
Personal information
- Date of birth: 14 October 1975 (age 51)
- Place of birth: Buzoești, Romania
- Height: 1.80 m (5 ft 11 in)
- Position: Midfielder

Team information
- Current team: CS Dinamo București (technical director)

Youth career
- –1994: Dacia Pitești

Senior career*
Years	Team	Apps	(Gls)
1994–2000	Dacia Pitești	124	(23)
2000	ARO Câmpulung	17	(2)
2001–2005	Dinamo București	48	(0)
2001–2002	→ FC Brașov (loan)	7	(0)
2002–2003	→ Oțelul Galați (loan)	27	(1)
2005–2006	Vaslui	27	(3)
2006–2007	Argeș Pitești	25	(0)
Total		275	(29)

Managerial career
- 2007–2009: Argeș Pitești
- 2009–2010: Internațional Curtea de Argeș
- 2010: Pandurii Târgu Jiu
- 2010–2012: Universitatea Cluj
- 2012: FC Brașov
- 2013: Oțelul Galați
- 2014–2017: Romania (assistant)
- 2018: Concordia Chiajna
- 2019–2020: Argeș Pitești
- 2021: Astra Giurgiu
- 2022: UTA Arad
- 2024–: CS Dinamo București (technical director)
- * Club domestic league appearances and goals

Ionuţ Badea (born 14 October 1975) is a Romanian football manager and former player, currently technical director at Liga II club CS Dinamo București.

== Honours ==
=== Player ===
Dinamo București

- Divizia A: 2003–04
- Cupa României: 2000–01, 2003–04, 2004–05

=== Coach ===
Argeș Pitești

- Liga II: 2007–08

Astra Giurgiu

- Cupa României runner-up: 2020–21
