= Adrian Baldovin =

Romanian footballer

Personal information
- Date of birth: 5 October 1971 (age 55)
- Place of birth: Galați, Romania
- Height: 1.80 m (5 ft 11 in)
- Position: Right back

Youth career
- 1980–1988: Progresul Brăila

Senior career*
Years	Team	Apps	(Gls)
1988–1997	Dacia Unirea Brăila (Note: The statistics for the 1988–89 and 1989–90 seasons are unavailable.)	153	(9)
1997–1999	Ceahlăul Piatra Neamț	81	(8)
2000	Rocar București	9	(0)
2000–2002	Universitatea Craiova	47	(1)
2002–2003	UTA Arad	23	(2)
2003	Oțelul Galați	7	(0)
2004	Național București	8	(0)
2004–2005	Politehnica Iași	13	(0)
2005	Astra Ploiești	2	(0)
2006	Dacia Unirea Brăila	9	(0)
Total		352	(20)

Managerial career
- 2006: Petrolul Ianca
- 2006–2007: Dacia Unirea Brăila (assistant)
- 2009–2010: Viitorul Ianca
- 2017: Viitorul Ianca
- 2018: Dacia Unirea Brăila II
- 2018–2019: Sportul Chișcani
- 2021–2022: Dacia Unirea Brăila U19
- 2022: Viitorul Ianca
- 2023–2024: Dacia Unirea Brăila (Assistant)
- 2024–: Dacia Unirea Brăila (Caretaker)
- * Club domestic league appearances and goals

Adrian Baldovin (born 5 October 1971) is a Romanian former football defender. After he ended his playing career, Baldovin worked as a manager at teams from the Romanian lower leagues.

== Honours ==
Dacia Unirea Brăila

- Divizia B: 1989–90
- Cupa României runner-up: 1992–93
