= Daniel Orac =

Romanian footballer

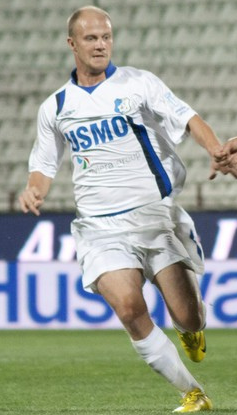

Personal information
- Date of birth: 6 April 1985 (age 41)
- Place of birth: Galaţi, România
- Height: 1.72 m (5 ft 8 in)
- Position: Winger

Senior career*
Years	Team	Apps	(Gls)
1999–2000	Dunărea Galaţi	1	(0)
2002–2003	Steaua București	6	(0)
2003–2004	Oțelul Galați	10	(1)
2004–2005	FC Caracal	26	(3)
2005–2006	Universitatea Craiova	13	(1)
2006–2009	Pandurii Târgu Jiu	69	(2)
2008–2009	→ CSM Râmnicu Vâlcea (loan)	15	(2)
2009–2010	Panthrakikos	6	(0)
2010–2011	Pandurii Târgu Jiu	24	(2)
2011–2012	CSMS Iași	5	(0)
Total		175	(11)

International career
2003	Romania U-17	2	(0)
2004–2005	Romania U-19	4	(0)
- * Club domestic league appearances and goals

Daniel Orac (born 6 April 1985) is a former Romanian professional footballer who played as a winger. He played 115 times in Liga I, and also played in the Super League Greece for Panthrakikos. His uncle is Costel Orac who was also a footballer.

== Club career ==
=== Pandurii Târgu Jiu ===
After an unsuccessful year at Universitatea Craiova Orac joined Pandurii Târgu Jiu. After a falling out with manager Sorin Cârţu he was first loaned to CSM Râmnicu Vâlcea and the then terminated his contract.

=== Panthrakikos ===
Orac played for Panthrakikos in the Super League Greece in season 2009–2010.

=== Return to Pandurii ===
He returned to Pandurii Târgu Jiu after just one year away.

=== CSMS Iași ===
In July 2011 Orac joined Liga II side CSMS Iași due to a close relationship with manager Marius Baciu.
