= Cornel Cernea =

Romanian footballer

Personal information
- Date of birth: 22 April 1976 (age 50)
- Place of birth: Căzănești, Romania
- Height: 1.84 m (6 ft 0 in)
- Position: Goalkeeper

Team information
- Current team: Al-Okhdood (GK coach)

Youth career
- Grivița IRA București

Senior career*
Years	Team	Apps	(Gls)
1996	Grivița IRA București		
1997–1999	Minerul Motru	22	(0)
1999	Grivița București		
2000–2003	Petrolul Ploiești	39	(0)
2003–2005	Oțelul Galați	36	(0)
2005–2009	Steaua București	24	(0)
2009–2010	Unirea Alba Iulia	16	(0)
2010	Victoria Brănești	6	(0)
2010–2011	Unirea Urziceni	12	(0)
2011–2012	Farul Constanța	8	(0)
2012–2013	AS Căzănești		
2014	Progresul București		
Total		163	(0)

Managerial career
- 2012–2013: AS Căzănești (player/manager)
- 2014: Fortuna Poiana Câmpina (GK coach)
- 2015: Astra Giurgiu (GK coach)
- 2015: ACS Poli Timișoara (GK coach)
- 2015–2017: SCM Pitești (GK coach)
- 2017–2018: CFR Cluj (GK coach)
- 2018–2019: Guizhou (GK coach)
- 2019: CFR Cluj (GK coach)
- 2020–2025: Sepsi OSK (GK coach)
- 2025: Unirea Slobozia (GK coach)
- 2026–: Al-Okhdood (GK coach)
- * Club domestic league appearances and goals

Cornel Cernea (born 22 April 1976) is a Romanian former professional footballer who played as a goalkeeper, currently goalkeeping coach at Saudi Pro League club Al-Okhdood.

== Club career ==
Cernea played for Grivița IRA until 1997, when he joined the Divizia B team Minerul Motru. In 1999, he returns to Grivița IRA but after only few weeks joins Petrolul Ploiești and makes Divizia A debut. In 2003, he joins Oțelul Galați for a couple of seasons, before being bought by Steaua București in 2005 for a fee of €75,000. His last team being Progresul Bucuresti he retired in 2014.

== Honours ==
Petrolul Ploiești

- Divizia B: 2002–03

Oțelul Galați

- Cupa României runner-up: 2003–04

Steaua București

- Divizia A: 2005–06
- Supercupa României: 2006
