= Florin Nohai =

Romanian footballer

Personal information
- Full name: Florin Gheorghe Nohai
- Date of birth: 13 April 1981 (age 45)
- Place of birth: Piatra Neamț, România
- Height: 1.78 m (5 ft 10 in)
- Position: Right back

Senior career*
Years	Team	Apps	(Gls)
1998–2008	Ceahlăul Piatra Neamț	155	(2)
2008–2010	Gaz Metan Mediaș	31	(0)
2011–2012	Ceahlăul Piatra Neamț	19	(0)
2012–2014	Poli Timișoara	31	(0)
2014–2015	Ripensia II Timișoara	15	(0)
2015–2017	Dumbrăvița		
2018	Voința Biled		
2018–2019	Flacăra Parța		
2019–2020	ASO Deta		
Total		251	(2)
- * Club domestic league appearances and goals as of 09:00, 6 October 2021 (UTC)

Florin Gheorghe Nohai (born 13 April 1981) is a Romanian former footballer who played as a right back for teams such as Ceahlăul Piatra Neamț, Gaz Metan Mediaș or ACS Poli Timișoara, among others.
