= Ionuț Dragomir =

Romanian footballer

Ionuţ Dragomir
Personal information
- Full name: Ionuţ Daniel Dragomir
- Date of birth: 4 July 1974 (age 52)
- Place of birth: Bucharest, Romania
- Height: 1.68 m (5 ft 6 in)
- Position: Full back

Youth career
- Steaua București

Senior career*
Years	Team	Apps	(Gls)
1994–1996	Steaua Mizil	43	(0)
1996	Atletic București	0	(0)
1997	Acumulatorul București	15	(0)
1997–1999	Midia Năvodari	60	(8)
1999–2002	FC U Craiova	67	(2)
2002	→ Petrolul Ploieşti (loan)	9	(0)
2003	UTA Arad	13	(0)
2003–2005	Oțelul Galați	54	(0)
2006–2007	Pandurii Târgu Jiu	38	(0)
2008	Inter Gaz București	9	(0)
2008–2009	Minerul Lupeni	9	(0)
Total		317	(10)
Medal record
FC U Craiova
Runner-up	Romanian Cup	2000
Oțelul Galați
Runner-up	Romanian Cup	2004
- * Club domestic league appearances and goals as of 22 March 2018

Ionuţ Daniel Dragomir (born 4 July 1974) is a Romanian former footballer who played as a full back. Dragomir grew up at Steaua București football academy and made his Liga I debut 15 August 1999 for FC U Craiova, in a 1–2 defeat against Dinamo București. In his career Dragomir played only for Romanian clubs, among them: FC U Craiova, Petrolul Ploieşti, UTA Arad, Oțelul Galați or Pandurii Târgu Jiu. He retired in 2009 after a last season played at Minerul Lupeni.
