= Nicolae Zamfir =

Romanian football manager (1944–2022)

Personal information
- Full name: Nicolae Țică Zamfir
- Date of birth: 14 December 1944
- Place of birth: Craiova, Romania
- Date of death: 14 September 2022 (aged 77)
- Place of death: Craiova, Romania

Managerial career
- Years: Team
- 1980–1986: Universitatea Craiova (U-18 & U-21)
- 1986–1990: Universitatea Craiova (assistant)
- 1990–1991: Bdin Vidin
- 1991–1993: FC U Craiova (U-18)
- 1993–1994: Drobeta Turnu Severin
- 1994–1995: FC U Craiova (assistant)
- 1995–1996: Chimia Râmnicu Vâlcea
- 1997: FC U Craiova
- 1999–2000: JEF United Ichihara

Nicolae Țică Zamfir (14 December 1944 – 14 September 2022) is a Romanian football manager.

He coached Universitatea Craiova, Bdin Vidin, FC U Craiova, Drobeta Turnu Severin, Chimia Râmnicu Vâlcea and JEF United Ichihara in Japan. While coaching juniors at Universitatea Craiova, he discovered and formed Gheorghe Popescu. Zamfir died of a heart attack on 14 September 2022.

== JEF United Ichihara ==
In July 1999, Zamfir signed with J1 League club JEF United Ichihara which was at the 15th place of 16 clubs in 1st stage in 1999 season. He managed the club from 2nd stage and contributed to the club remaining in J1 League. In 2000 season, although the club was at 11th place in 1st stage, the club won only 1 match in first 8 matches in 2nd stage and he resigned in August.

== Managerial statistics ==
Team	From	To	Record				
Team	From	To	G	W	D	L	Win %
JEF United Ichihara	1999	2000	38	13	2	23	34.21
Total			38	13	2	23	34.21
