= Angelo Alistar =

Romanian footballer

Personal information
- Full name: Angelo Dumitru Alistar
- Date of birth: 2 August 1975 (age 51)
- Place of birth: Piatra Neamț, Romania
- Height: 1.85 m (6 ft 1 in)
- Position: Defender

Youth career
- Ceahlăul Piatra Neamț

Senior career*
Years	Team	Apps	(Gls)
1995–2000	Ceahlăul Piatra Neamț	70	(3)
1995–1996	→ Foresta Fălticeni (loan)	3	(0)
2000–2001	Universitatea Craiova	19	(0)
2002	Ceahlăul Piatra Neamț	17	(0)
2002–2005	Dinamo București	30	(0)
2005	Dinamo II București	6	(0)
2003	→ Ceahlăul Piatra Neamț (loan)	28	(2)
2005	Hapoel Petah Tikva	17	(0)
2006–2007	Ceahlăul Piatra Neamț	28	(1)
2007–2008	Otopeni	13	(0)
2008–2009	Internațional Curtea de Argeș	0	(0)
2015	Victoria Horia		
2015–2018	Cimentul Bicaz		
2019	Pașcani		
2019–2023	Cimentul Bicaz		
2023	Speranța Răucești		
2023–2024	Ceahlăul II Piatra Neamț		
Total		231	(6)

Managerial career
- 2024–2025: Ceahlăul Piatra Neamț (team manager)
- 2025–2026: Ceahlăul Piatra Neamț (president)
- * Club domestic league appearances and goals

Angelo Dumitru Alistar (born 2 August 1975) is a Romanian former professional footballer who played as a defender.

== Honours ==
Dinamo București

- Divizia A: 2003–04
- Cupa României: 2003–04, 2004–05
- Supercupa României runner-up: 2002

Ceahlăul Piatra Neamț

- Divizia B: 2005–06
