= Alin Rus =

Romanian footballer

Personal information
- Full name: Alin Valer Rus
- Date of birth: 30 September 1975 (age 51)
- Place of birth: Turda, România
- Height: 1.83 m (6 ft 0 in)
- Position: Defender

Youth career
- Turdeana Turda

Senior career*
Years	Team	Apps	(Gls)
1996	Sticla Arieşul Turda	?	(?)
1997–1999	Gloria Bistriţa	44	(0)
1999–2002	Mechel Câmpia Turzii	18	(0)
2002–2006	Gloria Bistriţa	104	(1)
2006	→ Gloria II Bistriţa	6	(0)
2006–2009	Pandurii Târgu Jiu	65	(1)
2009	Gloria Bistriţa	9	(0)
2010	Arieşul Turda	8	(0)
2010	FC Hunedoara	?	(?)
2011–2012	Gillingham Town	?	(?)
Total		254+	(2)
- * Club domestic league appearances and goals as of 27 February 2018

Alin Valer Rus (born 30 September 1975) is a Romanian former professional footballer who played as a defender in Romania for teams like: Sticla Arieşul Turda, Gloria Bistriţa, Mechel Câmpia Turzii, Pandurii Târgu Jiu or FC Hunedoara. In 2011, Rus emigrated to England where he started working, as a taxi driver, in parallel he played for one and a half year for the lower leagues team, Gillingham Town.
