= Satellite team =

Motorsport team related to a larger, better-funded team

In motorsport, a satellite team is a team related to a larger, better-funded team (which may be referred to as the factory team), which may involve ownership, technical support, and staff sharing, including drivers.

== Definition ==
If the larger team is factory-backed (i.e. supported by a manufacturer), then the satellite team is termed a semi-works team.

In motorcycle racing such as MotoGP, factory teams are given the most up-to-date motorcycles and parts, while satellite teams may use the previous season's motorcycle and are given equipment updates only after the factory team has had them.

== Examples ==
Sport	Satellite team	Related team	Reference
NASCAR	Wood Brothers Racing	Team Penske	
NASCAR	Leavine Family Racing	Joe Gibbs Racing	
MotoGP	Trackhouse Racing	Aprilia Racing	
MotoGP	VR46 Racing Team	Ducati Corse	
MotoGP	Gresini Racing	Ducati Corse	
MotoGP	LCR Team	Honda HRC Castrol	
MotoGP	Red Bull KTM Tech3	Red Bull KTM Factory Racing	
MotoGP	Pramac Racing	Yamaha Motor Racing	

== See also ==
- Factory-backed
- Privateer (motorsport)
