= Cornel Dobre =

Romanian former footballer

Personal information
- Date of birth: 5 July 1975 (age 51)
- Place of birth: Bucharest, Romania
- Height: 1.67 m (5 ft 6 in)
- Position: Right-back

Team information
- Current team: Al-Arabi (assistant)

Youth career
- –1992: Victoria București
- 1992–1993: Steaua București

Senior career*
Years	Team	Apps	(Gls)
1993–1994	Steaua II București	3	(0)
1994–1995	Rocar București	46	(4)
1996	Steaua II București	13	(1)
1996–1997	Rocar București	40	(4)
1997–1999	Dinamo București	43	(1)
1999–2000	Rocar București	13	(3)
2000–2002	FC U Craiova	56	(3)
2002–2003	Astra Ploieşti	23	(0)
2003–2004	Oţelul Galaţi	23	(1)
2004–2006	Argeş Piteşti	35	(1)
2005	→ Oțelul Galați (loan)	5	(0)
2006	Unirea Urziceni	16	(2)
2007	Ceahlăul Piatra Neamţ	4	(0)
2007	Dacia Mioveni	14	(0)
2008–2009	Progresul București	36	(1)
2009–2011	Juventus București	50	(2)
Total		420	(23)

Managerial career
- 2013: Damila Măciuca (assistant)
- 2013–2014: CSM Râmnicu Vâlcea (assistant)
- 2014–2015: Mioveni (assistant)
- 2017–2018: Voluntari (assistant)
- 2018: Dinamo București (assistant)
- 2019: Al-Tai (assistant)
- 2020: Mioveni (assistant)
- 2021–2022: Concordia Chiajna (assistant)
- 2022–2023: 1599 Șelimbăr (assistant)
- 2023–2024: Damac (assistant)
- 2025: Voluntari (assistant)
- 2025: Al-Kholood (assistant)
- 2025–: Al-Arabi (assistant)
- * Club domestic league appearances and goals

Cornel Dobre (born 5 July 1975) is a former Romanian professional footballer who played as a right-back, currently assistant coach at Qatar Stars League club Al-Arabi.

== Honours ==
Oțelul Galați

- Cupa României runner-up: 2003–04

Juventus București

- Liga III: 2009–10
