= Daniel Petroesc =

Romanian footballer

Daniel Petroiesc
Personal information
- Full name: Ioan Daniel Petroiesc
- Date of birth: 13 August 1975 (age 51)
- Place of birth: Hunedoara, Romania
- Height: 1.80 m (5 ft 11 in)
- Positions: Defender; midfielder

Team information
- Current team: AS Strejnic

Youth career
- Corvinul Hunedoara

Senior career*
Years	Team	Apps	(Gls)
1995–1997	Corvinul Hunedoara	44	(0)
1997–2003	Astra Ploiești	160	(11)
2003–2004	Petrolul Ploiești	23	(1)
2004	Argeș Pitești	2	(0)
2005	Brașov	9	(0)
2005–2006	Astra Ploiești	25	(3)
2006–2008	Conpet Ploiești	?	(?)
2017–	AS Strejnic	?	(?)
- * Club domestic league appearances and goals as of 12 December 2017

Ioan Daniel Petroiesc (born 13 October 1975), commonly known as Daniel Petroiesc, is a Romanian footballer who plays as a defender or midfielder for Liga V club AS Strejnic.

== Career ==
Petroiesc started his career at Corvinul Hunedoara, the club from his hometown, a club known in the past for its productive football academy. In 1997, he moved to Astra Ploiești, club for which he played the most of his career, with 14 goals in 185 matches for Astra, Petroiesc entered in the "Black Devils" hall of fame. Afterwards he played for Astra's main rival Petrolul Ploiești and also for teams such as Argeș Pitești, Brașov and lower league side Conpet Ploiești. In December 2017, Petroiesc decided to return on the pitch at 42 years old and at nine years after his retirement, signing with AS Strejnic from Prahova County.

== Honours ==
- Astra Ploiești

- Divizia B: 1997–98
