= Flavius Moldovan =

Romanian footballer

Personal information
- Full name: Mihail Flavius Moldovan
- Date of birth: 27 July 1976 (age 50)
- Place of birth: Reghin, Romania
- Position: Centre back

Senior career*
| Years | Team | Apps | (Gls) |
| 1994–1997 | ASA Târgu Mureş | 67 | (4) |
| 1997 | Steaua București | 0 | (0) |
| 1997–1998 | Universitatea Cluj | 31 | (1) |
| 1998–1999 | ASA Târgu Mureş | 17 | (1) |
| 1999–2002 | FC Brașov | 42 | (3) |
| 2002–2004 | FC Naţional | 46 | (1) |
| 2004–2005 | Rapid București | 13 | (1) |
| 2005–2006 | FC Brașov | 11 | (1) |
| 2006–2007 | FC Săcele | 27 | (0) |
| 2007–2008 | Gloria Bistriţa | 7 | (1) |
| 2009–2011 | FCM Târgu Mureş | 25 | (0) |
| Total | | 286 | (13) |

International career
| 2004 | Romania | 3 | (0) |
- * Club domestic league appearances and goals

Flavius Lucian Moldovan (born 27 July 1976) is a Romanian former football defender.

== Career ==
Moldovan has made three appearances for the Romanian national side during his career, which spans back to 1998, when he joined ASA Tîrgu Mureş.

In 1997, he was part of Steaua București team but never played for the first team, his contract being canceled after few weeks only.

Moldovan moved to FC Brașov in 1999, where he spent three years before joining FC Naţional București, eventually making the move to Rapid after the climax of the 2004 season.

== Honours ==
FCM Târgu Mureş

- Liga II: 2009–10
