= Dan Alexa =

Romanian footballer and manager

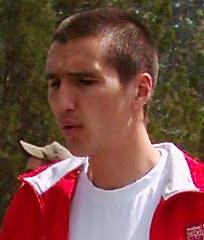
- Alexa in 2004

Personal information
- Date of birth: 28 October 1979 (age 47)
- Place of birth: Caransebeș, Romania
- Height: 1.86 m (6 ft 1 in)
- Position: Midfielder

Team information
- Current team: Politehnica Timișoara (head coach)

Youth career
- CSȘ Caransebeș
- LPS Banatul Timișoara

Senior career*
Years	Team	Apps	(Gls)
1998	UM Timișoara	10	(2)
1999–2001	Rocar București	45	(2)
2001	Fulgerul Bragadiru	4	(0)
2002	Universitatea Craiova	15	(0)
2002–2004	Dinamo București	47	(1)
2004–2005	Beijing Hyundai	40	(0)
2006	Dinamo București	13	(1)
2006–2011	Politehnica Timișoara	126	(5)
2011–2012	Rapid București	25	(3)
2012–2014	Anorthosis Famagusta	40	(4)
2017	Viitorul Caransebeș	1	(0)
Total		366	(18)

International career
2000	Romania U21	1	(0)
2004–2011	Romania	6	(2)

Managerial career
- 2014–2015: ACS Poli Timișoara
- 2015–2016: Rapid București
- 2016: ASA Târgu Mureș
- 2016–2017: Concordia Chiajna
- 2017–2019: Dunărea Călărași
- 2019: Astra Giurgiu
- 2020: Rapid București
- 2020–2021: ASU Politehnica Timișoara
- 2021–2022: CSM Reșița
- 2022–2023: FC Brașov
- 2023: Botoșani
- 2024–2025: Tunari
- 2025–: Politehnica Timișoara
- * Club domestic league appearances and goals

Dan Alexa (born 28 October 1979) is a Romanian professional football manager and former footballer who played as a midfielder, currently in charge of Liga II club Politehnica Timișoara.

== Club career ==
=== Early career ===
Although born in Banat, Alexa was considered disposable while at UM Timișoara in 1998, and he moved to Rocar București where he helped his side reach the 2000–01 Romanian Cup final.

=== Dinamo București ===
After several years with short spells at Fulgeru Bragadiru and Universitatea Craiova, Alexa got his big chance as Dinamo București decided to transfer him. His performances were of a high caliber throughout the two seasons he spent there, but he also got a reputation for being an extremely aggressive player. In two years, he scored 1 goal in 47 appearances.

=== Beijing Hyundai ===
His consequent move to Beijing Hyundai saw him leave Romania for two years. In a friendly match against Real Madrid he was selected man of the match.

=== Dinamo București ===
He returned to Dinamo in 2006 just for a few months playing 13 matches, scoring one goal.

=== Politehnica Timișoara ===
In the summer of the same year, Politehnica boss Marian Iancu decided to bring Alexa – by then, a real "persona non-grata" in Timișoara, due to his pledge of loyalty to Dinamo – back to the city where he started his career, together with teammate Ştefan Grigorie. The fans protested at Alexa's arrival in Timișoara through several banners and chants, but the club's management remained unimpressed. Alexa himself stated that he had made those statements out of necessity and that he will do all he can to prove to the fans that he is a real professional. A few months after his arrival, Alexa became the captain of Poli. He is nicknamed "the surgeon" because he inflicted many injuries requiring surgery to opposing players. On 19 April 2010, he scored the equaliser goal in the 98th minute against CFR Cluj and kept Poli in the battle for the title, however Poli finished 5th, losing their last three matches.

=== Rapid București ===
On 4 June 2011, the former captain of Politehnica Timișoara signed a two-year contract with Rapid București following the relegation of Poli.

=== Anorthosis Famagusta ===
On 24 June 2012, Dan Alexa signed with the Cyprus First Division football club, Anorthosis Famagusta, on a free transfer. He signed a reported €250,000/yr contract with the club.

== International career ==
Alexa was first called up by the national team in 2004. Later in 2010, he was called up for a friendly match against Italy after a six-year absence. Alexa scored his first goals for Romania in a 2–2 draw against Ukraine at Cyprus International Cup 2011. However, Romania were eliminated from the tournament, after losing on penalty kicks 4–2.

== Managerial career ==
After he ended his playing career, Alexa became a manager. His first job was at ACS Poli Timișoara, in March 2014. Since 23 August 2017 he was manager of Dunărea Călărași until summer of 2019. Then he was named manager of Astra Giurgiu.

== Career statistics ==
=== International ===
Appearances and goals by national team and year
National team	Year	Apps	Goals
Romania	2004	1	0
Romania	2010	1	0
Romania	2011	4	2
Total		6	2

Scores and results list Romania's goal tally first, score column indicates score after each Alexa goal.

List of international goals scored by Ionuț Nedelcearu
No.	Date	Venue	Cap	Opponent	Score	Result	Competition
1	8 February 2011	Paralimni Stadium, Paralimni, Cyprus	3	Ukraine	1–2	2–2	Friendly
2	8 February 2011	Paralimni Stadium, Paralimni, Cyprus	3	Ukraine	2–2	2–2	Friendly

== Managerial statistics ==
As of 31 October 2026

Team	From	To	Record							
Team	From	To	G	W	D	L	GF	GA	GD	Win %
ACS Poli Timișoara	17 March 2014	22 August 2015	48	21	14	13	57	41	+16	43.75
Rapid București	27 August 2015	20 July 2016	34	22	7	5	55	21	+34	64.71
ASA Târgu Mureș	7 August 2016	22 December 2016	23	8	3	12	32	38	−6	34.78
Concordia Chiajna	23 December 2016	18 July 2017	20	6	6	8	20	25	−5	30.00
Dunărea Călărași	22 August 2017	12 June 2019	76	36	21	19	95	63	+32	47.37
Astra Giurgiu	13 June 2019	10 October 2019	13	5	4	4	16	14	+2	38.46
Rapid București	11 March 2020	6 August 2020	5	1	3	1	4	4	+0	20.00
ASU Politehnica Timișoara	11 November 2020	17 June 2021	19	6	6	7	20	24	−4	31.58
CSM Reșița	30 June 2021	10 June 2022	32	25	6	1	91	16	+75	78.13
FC Brașov	23 June 2022	8 August 2023	27	13	7	7	58	31	+27	48.15
Botoșani	1 September 2023	2 November 2023	9	0	3	6	10	24	−14	0.00
Tunari	18 March 2024	23 July 2025	37	26	4	7	91	30	+61	70.27
Politehnica Timișoara	24 July 2025	present	49	34	10	5	92	32	+60	69.39
Total			392	203	94	95	645	363	+282	51.79

== Honours ==
=== Player ===
UM Timișoara

- Divizia C: 1998–99

Rocar București

- Cupa României runner-up: 2000–01

Dinamo București

- Divizia A: 2003–04
- Cupa României: 2002–03, 2003–04

Politehnica Timișoara

- Cupa României runner-up: 2006–07, 2008–09

=== Coach ===
ACS Poli Timișoara

- Liga II: 2014–15

Rapid București

- Liga II: 2015–16

Dunărea Călărași

- Liga II: 2017–18

CSM Reșița

- Liga III: 2021–22

Tunari

- Liga III: 2024–25

Politehnica Timișoara

- Liga III: 2025–26
