= Augustin Călin (footballer) =

Romanian footballer

Personal information
- Full name: Aurel Augustin Călin
- Date of birth: 5 August 1973 (age 53)
- Place of birth: Craiova, Romania
- Height: 1.80 m (5 ft 11 in)
- Position: Attacking midfielder

Team information
- Current team: Academica Clinceni (sporting director)

Youth career
- –1991: Universitatea Craiova

Senior career*
Years	Team	Apps	(Gls)
1991–1996	Universitatea Craiova	78	(13)
1996–1997	Steaua București	23	(4)
1997–1999	Dinamo București	9	(4)
1999–2000	Rocar București	26	(6)
2000–2001	Universitatea Craiova	10	(0)
2002	Trento Calcio	10	(1)
2002–2003	Universitatea Craiova	5	(0)
2003	Liaoning Hongyun	18	(2)
2004	Oțelul Galați	20	(3)
2005	Real Montecchio	9	(3)
2005	Henan Jianye	3	(0)
2006–2008	Maceratese	9+	(3+)
Total		220	(39)

International career
1994–1996	Romania	2	(0)

Managerial career
- 2021–2022: Academica Clinceni (sporting director)
- 2023: Ohod (caretaker)
- * Club domestic league appearances and goals

Augustin Călin (born 5 August 1973) is a Romanian former professional footballer who played as an attacking midfielder.

== Playing career ==
As a player, Călin played for several Romanian clubs such as Universitatea Craiova, Steaua București, Dinamo București and Oțelul Galați. He also played in China for Liaoning and Henan Jianye and in Italy for lower league sides Trento Calcio and Maceratese. He retired in 2006.

== Honours ==
FC Universitatea Craiova

- Cupa României: 1992–93

Steaua București

- Divizia A: 1996–97
- Cupa României: 1996–97
