= Cornel Frăsineanu =

Romanian footballer (born 1976)

Personal information
- Full name: Cornel Dănuț Frăsineanu
- Date of birth: 20 August 1976 (age 50)
- Place of birth: Caracal, Olt, Romania
- Height: 1.70 m (5 ft 7 in)
- Position: Left-back

Senior career*
Years	Team	Apps	(Gls)
1994–1995	Universitatea Craiova	2	(0)
1995–1996	Minerul Motru	23	(7)
1996–2000	Universitatea Craiova	105	(8)
2000–2001	Rapid București	25	(1)
2001	Hapoel Tzafririm Holon		
2001–2002	Universitatea Craiova	13	(2)
2002–2003	Dinamo București	17	(1)
2003–2007	Bursaspor	118	(25)
2007	UTA Arad	8	(0)
2007–2008	Dacia Mioveni	17	(2)
2008–2010	Internațional Curtea de Argeș	36	(5)
2011	Vișina Nouă	13	(1)
2011–2012	Caracal	8	(0)
2012	Atletic Bradu	20	(0)
2012–2013	Juventus București	16	(2)
2013	FC U Craiova	10	(0)
Total		431	(54)

International career
1996–1997	Romania U-21	7	(1)

Managerial career
- 2014–2015: Atletic Bradu
- * Club domestic league appearances and goals

Cornel Dănuț Frăsineanu (born 20 August 1976) is a Romanian former professional footballer who played as a left-back. He was also a manager at Atletic Bradu in the Romanian Liga IV.

== Honours ==
Dinamo București

- Cupa României: 2002–03

Bursaspor

- Turkish Second League: 2005–06
