= Ciprian Danciu =

Romanian former football player

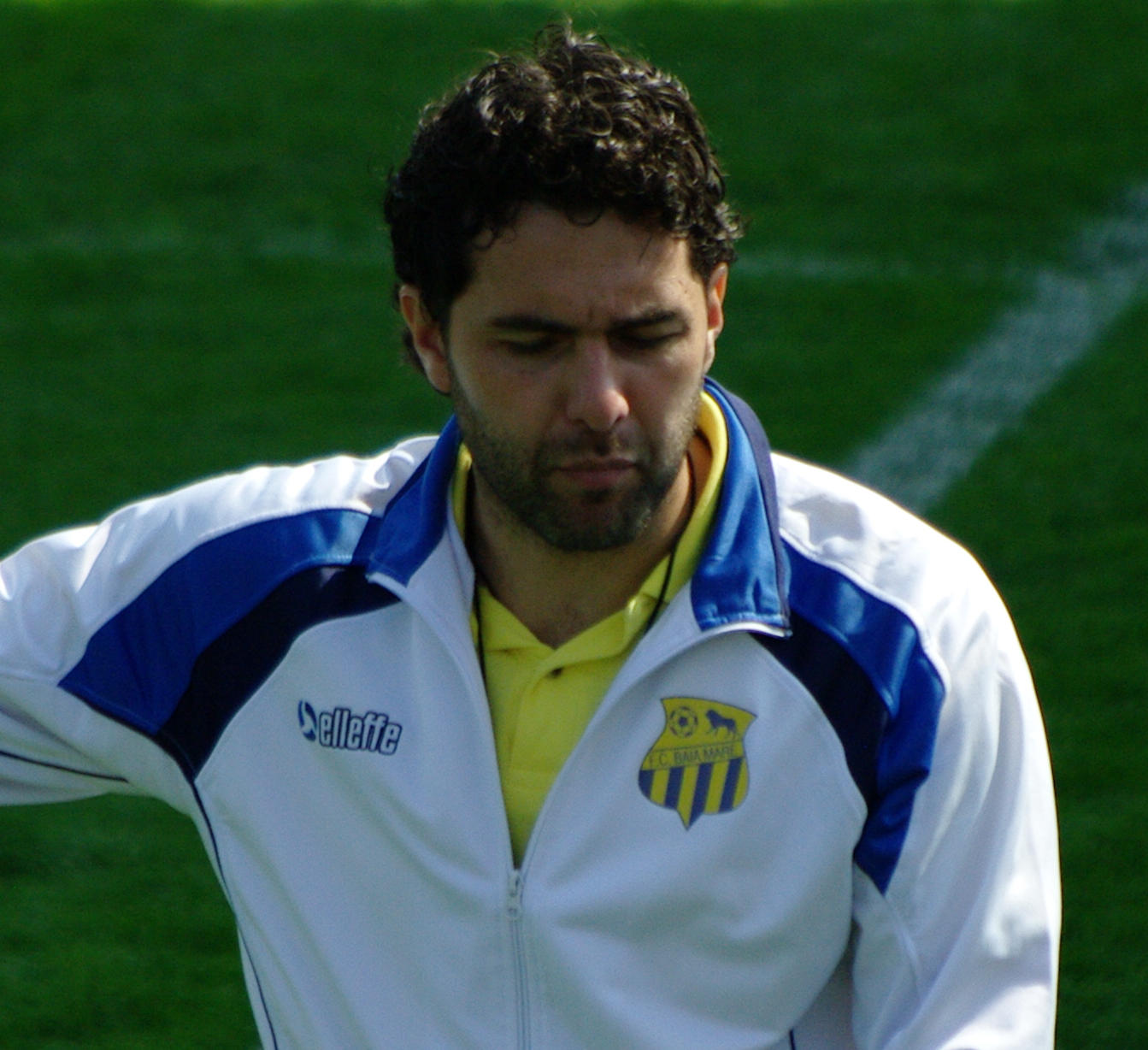

Personal information
- Date of birth: 9 June 1977 (age 49)
- Place of birth: Baia Mare, Romania
- Height: 1.85 m (6 ft 1 in)
- Position: Attacking midfielder

Senior career*
Years	Team	Apps	(Gls)
1993–1999	FC Baia Mare	121	(8)
1994	→ Phoenix Baia Mare (loan)	7	(0)
1999–2000	Rocar București	27	(8)
2000–2002	Universitatea Craiova	40	(6)
2002	Dinamo București	4	(0)
2003	Astra Ploieşti	5	(1)
2003–2004	Oțelul Galați	33	(1)
2005–2006	Argeș Pitești	15	(0)
2006–2007	Al-Arabi		
2007–2008	Gloria Bistrița	6	(0)
Total		258	(24)

Managerial career
- 2010: FC Baia Mare
- 2010: FCMU Baia Mare
- 2010–2012: FC Vaslui (assistant)
- 2014: Cetatea Târgu Neamț
- 2019–2020: Comuna Recea
- 2021–2022: Minaur Baia Mare
- 2023–2024: Minaur Baia Mare
Medal record
Oțelul Galați
Runner-up	Romanian Cup	2004
- * Club domestic league appearances and goals as of 21 February 2026

Ciprian Danciu (born 9 June 1977) is a Romanian former football player and currently a manager.

== Honours ==
=== Player ===
FC Baia Mare

- Divizia B: 1993–94

Dinamo București

- Cupa României: 2002–03

=== Manager ===
Minaur Baia Mare

- Liga III: 2021–22
