= CS Inter Gaz București =

Romanian football club (1973–2009)

Inter Gaz București
- Full name: Clubul Sportiv Inter Gaz București
- Short name: Inter Gaz București
- Founded: 1973; 52 years ago as Mecos București; 1994; 31 years ago as Intergaz-Glin
- Dissolved: 2009
- Ground: Stadionul Inter Gaz
- Capacity: 1,000
Home colours	Away colours

Inter Gaz București was a Romanian professional football club from Bucharest, Romania, founded in 1973 and dissolved in 2009.

== History ==
The club was founded in the summer of 1973 as Mecos București once with the canning and luncheon meats factory with the same name from Popești-Leordeni, a village from Ilfov County near to Bucharest.

Coached by Florea Sisilică, Mecos was promoted to third division at the end of the 1988–89 season by winning the Bucharest Municipal Championship and the promotion playoffs contested against the winners of the Ilfov County Championship, AS Chiajna (0–0 and 4–2) and the Călărași County Championship, Înainte Modelu (3–0 and 1–3).

In the first three seasons in Divizia C, Mecos enjoyed success finishing in the top-table: 6th in 1989–90 season, 3rd in 1990–91 season and 4th in 1991- 92 season.

The club name changed in 1992 to AS Glina and two years later, after was finished 14th in the 1992–93 season and 18th at the end of the 1993–94 season, it was relegated, ending a five-seasons stay in the third division.

In the summer of 1994 AS Glina merged with Gaz Metan București and was renamed as Intergaz-Glin.

In the 1996–97 season, coached by Nicolae Dumitru, Inter Gaz won the series from which was part in the Bucharest Municipal Championship and played the play-off with the winner of the other Bucharest series, Antilopa București, promoting to Divizia C after 4–1 at the Rocar Stadium.

== Stadium ==
Inter Gaz played its home matches at Inter Gaz Stadium, in Popești-Leordeni, which has a capacity of 100 seats.

== Honours ==
- Liga III
  - Winners (1): 2000–01
  - Runners-up (1): 2006–07
- Liga IV – Bucharest
  - Winners (2): 1988–89, 1996–97
  - Runners-up (1): 1987–88

== Notable former players ==
The footballers mentioned below have played at least 1 season for Inter Gaz and also played in Liga I for another team.

- (Romania) Constantin Bârsan
- (Romania) Sergiu Bar
- (Romania) Cristian Vasc
- (Romania) Sorin Bucuroaia
- (Romania) Gabriel Mărgărit
- (Romania) Marius Coporan
- (Romania) Cristian Vlad
- (Romania) Alin Savu
- (Romania) Eduard Nicola
- (Romania) Augustin Chiriță
- (Romania) Ionuț Voicu
- (Romania) Daniel Novac
- (Romania) Ionuț Curcă
- (Romania) Eusebiu Tudor
- (Romania) Bobi Verdeș

== Former managers ==
- (Romania) Cornel Nica (2000–2002)
- (Romania) Victor Roșca (2002–2004)
- (Romania) Marius Lăcătuș (2005)
- (Romania) Alexandru Moldovan (2007)
- (Romania) Marius Șumudică (2008)
- (Romania) Ștefan Nanu (2008)
- (Romania) Marian Bondrea (2008–2009)
