= 2003–04 Cupa României =

Tournament details
- Country: Romania

Final positions
- Champions: Dinamo București
- Runners-up: Oțelul Galați

The 2003–04 Cupa României was the 66th edition of Romania's most prestigious football cup competition.

The title was won by Dinamo București against Oțelul Galați.

== Format ==
The competition is an annual knockout tournament.

First round proper matches are played on the ground of the lowest ranked team, then from the second round proper the matches are played on a neutral location.

If a match is drawn after 90 minutes, the game goes into extra time, where it works golden goal rule. If the match is still tied, the result is decided by penalty kicks.

In the quarter-finals and semi-finals, each tie is played as a two legs.

From the first edition, the teams from Divizia A entered in competition in sixteen finals, rule which remained till today.

== First round proper ==
| Team 1 | Score | Team 2 |
|---|---|---|
30 September 2003
| Gaz Metan Mediaș (Div. B) | 0–1 | (Div. A) Gloria Bistrița |
1 October 2003
| Oașul Negrești (Div. B) | 1–2 | (Div. A) Naţional București |
| Petrolul Bolintin Vale (Div. C) | 0–3 | (Div. A) Argeș Pitești |
| CS Otopeni (Div. C) | 3–3 (a.e.t.) (4–3 p) | (Div. A) Farul Constanța |
| Inter Gaz București (Div. B) | 2–5 | (Div. A) Dinamo București |
| Dacia Mioveni (Div. B) | 0–2 | (Div. A) Politehnica AEK Timișoara |
| Laminorul Roman (Div. B) | 0–2 | (Div. A) Oțelul Galați |
| Electrica Constanța (Div. B) | 1–0 | (Div. A) FCM Bacău |
| Petrolul Moinești (Div. B) | 2–1 | (Div. A) FC Brașov |
| Pandurii Târgu Jiu (Div. B) | 0–3 | (Div. A) Rapid București |
| Chimica Târnăveni (Div. C) | 0–1 | (Div. A) Apulum Alba Iulia |
| Dunărea Galați (Div. C) | 0–2 | (Div. A) Petrolul Ploiești |
| Chimia Craiova (Div. D) | 0–4 | (Div. A) Steaua București |
| Tricotaje Ineu (Div. B) | 2–1 | (Div. A) Ceahlăul Piatra Neamț |
| Jiul Petroșani (Div. B) | 1–0 | (Div. A) FC U Craiova |
8 October 2003
| ACU Arad (Div. B) | 1–2 | (Div. A) FC Oradea |

== Second round proper ==
| Team 1 | Score | Team 2 |
|---|---|---|
21 October 2003
| FC Oradea | 0–1 | Rapid București |
22 October 2003
| Petrolul Ploiești | 2–1 (a.e.t.) | Steaua București |
| Apulum Alba Iulia | 3–2 (a.e.t.) | Jiul Petroșani |
| Gloria Bistrița | 3–1 | Electrica Constanța |
| Tricotaje Ineu | 2–11 | Politehnica AEK Timișoara |
| Argeș Pitești | 1–0 | Petrolul Moinești |
| Dinamo București | 5–1 | CS Otopeni |
| Naţional București | 2–3 (a.e.t.) | Oțelul Galați |

== Quarter-finals ==
The matches were played on 3 December 2003 and 17 March 2004.

| Team 1 | Agg. | Team 2 | 1st leg | 2nd leg |
|---|---|---|---|---|
| Gloria Bistrița | 2–1 (a.e.t.) | Politehnica AEK Timișoara | 1–0 | 1–1 (a.e.t.) |
| Dinamo București | 9–1 | Petrolul Ploiești | 7–0 | 2–1 |
| Oțelul Galați | 2–1 | Rapid București | 2–0 | 0–1 |
| Argeș Pitești | 5–0 | Apulum Alba Iulia | 4–0 | 1–0 |

== Semi-finals ==
The matches were played on 7 April and 21 April 2004.

| Team 1 | Agg. | Team 2 | 1st leg | 2nd leg |
|---|---|---|---|---|
| Argeș Pitești | 1–2 | Dinamo București | 1–0 | 0–2 |
| Gloria Bistrița | 0–5 | Oțelul Galați | 0–1 | 0–4 |

== Final ==
6 June 2004
19:00 EEST

| Dinamo București | 2–0 | Oțelul Galați |
|---|---|---|
| Munteanu 66'; Niculescu 77' | Report |

Stadionul Cotroceni, Bucharest
Attendance: 10,000
Referee: Cristian Balaj (Romania)

Cupa României 2003–04 winners

11th title
