= 2005–06 FC Oțelul Galați season =

FC Oțelul
2005–06 season
- Chairman: Viorel Anghelinei (until 29 August 2005); Marius Stan (from 30 August 2005)
- Manager: Aurel Șunda (until 9 November 2005); Ion Gigi (caretaker); Petre Grigoraș (from 27 December 2005)
- Divizia A: 9th
- Cupa României: Quarter-finals
- Top goalscorer: League: Stan (7); All: Stan (7); Bălțoi (6); Tănase (5); Crăciun (3); Paraschiv (3); Aldea (2)

== Competitions ==
=== Friendlies ===
8 July 2005	Oțelul Galați	0–2	FC Argeș	Sfântu Gheorghe
		(Report)	?,

July 2005	Oțelul Galați	0–3	Sportul Studențesc	Brașov
		(Report)	?,,

14 July 2005	Oțelul Galați	0–1	Farul Constanța	Brașov
11:00		(Report)	?	Stadium: Carpați

15 July 2005	Oțelul Galați	2–1	Dunărea Galați	Brașov
	Tănase; Alexandru	(Report)	Popliacă

26 July 2005	Oțelul Galați (Romania)	3–3	(Israel) Bnei Sakhnin	Brașov
	?,,	(Report)	?,,

28 July 2005	Oțelul Galați	1–2	Conpet Ploiești	Ploiești
	Ghidarcea	(Report)	?,

30 July 2005	Oțelul Galați	0–0	CF Brăila	Galați
10:30		(Report)		Stadium: Dunărea; Attendance: 100

25 August 2005	Petrolul Ianca	1–2	Oțelul Galați	Ianca
	?	(Report)	Alexandru; Bădescu

14 September 2005	Dunărea Galați	0–1	Oțelul Galați	Galați
		(Report)	Bădescu	Stadium: Dunărea

27 September 2005	Oțelul Galați	0–0	Politehnica Galați	Galați
		(Report)

19 January 2006 Turkey	Oțelul Galați (Romania)	2–1	(Germany) Wuppertaler	Antalya
	Stan 33'; Elek 82'	(Report)	Malura 87' (pen.)

22 January 2006 Turkey	Oțelul Galați (Romania)	1–1	(Russia) Krylia Sovetov	Antalya
	Stan 14'	(Report)	Bulyha 89'

24 January 2006 Turkey	Darıca Gençlerbirliği (Turkey)	0–1	(Romania) Oțelul Galați	Antalya
		(Report)	Tănase 83' (pen.)

26 January 2006 Turkey	Oțelul Galați (Romania)	1–0	(Ukraine) FC Chornomorets Odesa	Antalya
	Macare 74'	(Report)

28 January 2006 Turkey	Oțelul Galați (Romania)	3–2	(Ukraine) FC Volyn Lutsk	Antalya
	Stan 71', 85', 87'	(Report)	Satcko 34'; Gashin 88'

4 February 2006	CF Brăila	3–0	Oțelul Galați	Brăila
	Bogoș 9'; Pleșa 10'; Ghioca 51'	(Report)		Stadium: Progresul

8 February 2006 Cyprus	Oțelul Galați (Romania)	1–0	(Poland) Górnik Zabrze	Larnaca
	Gado 60'	(Report)

10 February 2006 Cyprus	Oțelul Galați (Romania)	0–1	(China) Shandong Luneng Taishan	Larnaca
		(Report)	Zheng Zhi 68'

12 February 2006 Cyprus	Oțelul Galați (Romania)	1–1	(Poland) Wisła Płock	Larnaca
	Bălțoi 4'	(Report)	?

14 February 2006 Cyprus	Oțelul Galați (Romania)	5–4	(South Korea) Busan I'Park	Larnaca
	Stan; Apostol; Costin (pen.); Bălțoi,	(Report)	?,,,

15 February 2006 Cyprus	Oțelul Galați (Romania)	2–3	(Romania) U. Cluj	Larnaca
	Elek ? (o.g.)	(Report)	?,,

17 February 2006 Cyprus	Oțelul Galați (Romania)	1–2	(Ukraine) FC Metalurh Zaporizhya	Larnaca
	Apostol (pen.)	(Report)	?,

23 February 2006	Oțelul Galați	5–1	FC Astra Ploiești	Galați
	Stan 24'; Apostol 29'; Apetrei 73' (pen.); Gado 81', 86'	(Report)	Oprea 60'	Stadium: Oțelul; Attendance: 3,000

26 February 2006	FC Farul Constanța	1–1	Oțelul Galați	Constanța
15:30	Senin 60' (pen.)	(Report)	Cristian Șchiopu 50' (o.g.)	Stadium: Farul

4 March 2006	Oțelul Galați	5–1	Junkers Galati	Galați
	Costin 28'; Bălțoi 58' (pen.); Mitic 88'	(Report)		Stadium: Siderurgistul; Attendance: 3,000

29 May 2006	Rapid Ovidiu	2–3	Oțelul Galați	Constanța
	?,	(Report)	Osvaldo Saldanha; Elek; Apetrei

30 May 2006	OIL Terminal	0–4	Oțelul Galați	Constanța
		(Report)	Paraschiv; Elek, Osvaldo Saldanha

=== Divizia A ===
==== League table ====
Pos	Team	Pld	W	D	L	GF	GA	GD	Pts	Qualification or relegation
7	Farul Constanța	30	14	3	13	39	38	+1	45	Qualification to Intertoto Cup first round
8	Politehnica Timișoara	30	10	10	10	34	31	+3	40	
9	Oțelul Galați	30	10	9	11	35	37	−2	39 (Note: OȚE: 8 pts; GLO: 5 pts; POL: 2 pts)	
10	Gloria Bistrița	30	11	6	13	27	34	−7	39	
11	Politehnica Iași	30	11	6	13	28	31	−3	39	

Source: LPF (in Romanian)
Rules for classification: 1) points; 2) head-to-head points; 3) head-to-head goal difference; 4) head-to-head goals scored; 5) goal difference; 6) number of goals scored.

==== Results by round ====
Round	1	2	3	4	5	6	7	8	9	10	11	12	13	14	15	16	17	18	19	20	21	22	23	24	25	26	27	28	29	30
Ground	H	A	H	A	H	A	H	A	H	A	H	A	H	H	A	A	H	A	H	A	H	A	H	A	H	A	H	A	A	H
Result	L	W	D	L	D	D	L	L	D	D	L	L	L	L	D	W	D	W	L	L	W	W	L	W	D	W	W	W	W	D
Position	15	8	12	12	12	12	12	14	13	14	15	15	15	15	15	15	14	12	13	14	13	13	13	12	12	12	11	10	10	9

Source: Matches
A = Away; H = Home; W = Win; D = Draw; L = Loss

==== Results summary ====
Overall								Home						Away					
Pld	W	D	L	GF	GA	GD	Pts	W	D	L	GF	GA	GD	W	D	L	GF	GA	GD
30	10	9	11	35	37	−2	39	2	6	7	11	20	−9	8	3	4	24	17	+7

==== Matches ====
7 August 2005 Matchday 1	Oțelul Galați	1–4	Dinamo București	Galați
18:00	Bădescu 85'	(Report)	Munteanu 25' (o.g.); Bălțoi 35'; Zicu 70', 72'	Stadium: Dunărea; Attendance: 3,000; Referee: Sebastian Colțescu

12 August 2005 Matchday 2	Politehnica Iași	0–1	Oțelul Galați	Iași
18:00	Ciobanu (yellow card) 19'; Onuț (yellow card) 44'; Onofraș (yellow card) 82'	(Report)	Munteanu 45' (pen.); Dumitru (yellow card) 46'; Mărginean (yellow card) 56'; Munteanu (yellow card) 62'; Zeciu (yellow card) 75'; Stanciu (yellow card) 83'; Alexandru (yellow card) 88'	Stadium: Emil Alexandrescu; Attendance: 7,000; Referee: Marius Martiș

21 August 2005 Matchday 3	Oțelul Galați	0–0	FCM Bacău	Galați
17:00	Zeciu (yellow card) 29'; Munteanu (yellow card) 88'	(Report)	Trofin (yellow card) 68'; Manea (yellow card) 90+2'	Stadium: Dunărea; Attendance: 1,500; Referee: Vasile Bratu

28 August 2005 Matchday 4	Steaua București	4–0	Oțelul Galați	Bucharest
21:00	Paraschiv 9'; Dică 19'; Neșu (yellow card) 37'; Iacob 57'; Ghionea (yellow card) 63'; Oprița 75'	(Report)		Stadium: Steaua; Attendance: 7,000; Referee: Victor Berbecaru

10 September 2005 Matchday 5	Oțelul Galați	3–3	Rapid București	Galați
17:00	Tănase (yellow card) 31', (goal) 42'; Aldea 45+1' (pen.), 67' (pen.); Crăciun (yellow card) 60'; Valencia (yellow card) 63'; Dragomir (yellow card) 79'	(Report)	Niculae 11'; Constantin 21'; Buga 38'; Constantin (yellow card) 44'; Maftei (yellow card) 70'; Art. Karamyan (yellow card) 80'; Dică (yellow card) 87'; Coman (yellow card) 90+4'	Stadium: Dunărea; Attendance: 7,000; Referee: Sebastian Colțescu

17 September 2005 Matchday 6	Gloria Bistrița	0–0	Oțelul Galați	Bistrița
17:00	Aștilean (yellow card) 19'; Constantinescu (yellow card) 39'	(Report)	Tănase (yellow card) 7'; Izvoranu (yellow card) 57'; Munteanu (yellow card) 61'; Urai (yellow card) 90+3'	Stadium: Gloria; Attendance: 700; Referee: Robert Dumitru

24 September 2005 Matchday 7	Oțelul Galați	0–1	CFR Cluj	Galați
17:00	Șomcherechi (yellow card) 88'	(Report)	Coroian 76'; Mijin (yellow card) 86'; Anca (yellow card) 90+2'	Stadium: Dunărea; Attendance: 2,000; Referee: Alexandru Tudor

1 October 2005 Matchday 8	Sportul Studențesc	4–0	Oțelul Galați	Bucharest
14:45	Nae (yellow card) 50'; Lazăr 60'; Bălan 65'; Mazilu 69', 87'	(Report)	Mărginean (yellow card) 57'; Izvoranu (yellow card) 66'	Stadium: Regie; Attendance: 1,000; Referee: Teodor Crăciunescu

16 October 2005 Matchday 9	Oțelul Galați	0–0	Jiul Petroșani	Galați
15:00	Munteanu (yellow card) 18'; Izvoranu (yellow card) 28'	(Report)	Pâcleșan (yellow card) 67'; Mulțescu (yellow card) 81'	Stadium: Dunărea; Attendance: 500; Referee: Alexandru Deaconu

22 October 2005 Matchday 10	SC Vaslui	0–0	Oțelul Galați	Vaslui
15:00	Buhuș (yellow card) 47'; Panait (red card) 88'	(Report)	Macare (yellow card) 11'; Urai (yellow card) 53'	Stadium: Municipal (Vaslui); Attendance: 5,000; Referee: Ionică Serea

29 October 2005 Matchday 11	Oțelul Galați	0–1	FC Argeș	Galați
15:00	Ghidarcea (yellow card) 41'; Zeciu (yellow card) 50'	(Report)	Bilașco 88' (pen.); Costescu (yellow card) 90'	Stadium: Dunărea; Attendance: 500; Referee: Marian Salomir

5 November 2005 Matchday 12	Progresul București	3–2	Oțelul Galați	Bucharest
14:00	I. Savu 19'; Srhoj 48', (yellow card) 79'; Iancu (yellow card) 89'; M. Savu 90+2'	(Report)	Ghidarcea (yellow card) 11'; Macare 56'; Balauru 66'; Urai (yellow card) 81'; Șomodean (yellow card) 90+2'	Stadium: Cotroceni; Attendance: 1,000; Referee: Marius Martiș

19 November 2005 Matchday 13	Oțelul Galați	0–2	FC Timișoara	Galați
14:00	Munteanu (yellow card) 58'	(Report)	Mansour (yellow card) 29'; Coman 39'; Bătrânu (yellow card) 54'; Coman (yellow card) 58'; Olah (yellow card) 71'; Silvășan 90+2'	Stadium: Dunărea; Attendance: 4,000; Referee: Alexandru Tudor

27 November 2005 Matchday 14	Oțelul Galați	0–1	Farul Constanța	Galați
13:30	Izvoranu (yellow card) 82'	(Report)	Moldovan 84'	Stadium: Dunărea; Attendance: 3,500; Referee: Lucian Dan

2 December 2005 Matchday 15	Pandurii Târgu Jiu	2–2	Oțelul Galați	Târgu Jiu
13:00	Disney 35'; Glișcă 42'; Perišić (yellow card) 52'	(Report)	Crăciun 52'; Macare (yellow card) 56'; Șomodean (yellow card) 59'; Munteanu (yellow card) 66'; Ghidarcea 71'; Neculai (yellow card) 88'	Stadium: Tudor Vladimirescu; Attendance: 3,500; Referee: Augustus Constantin

11 March 2006 Matchday 16	Dinamo București	0–3	Oțelul Galați	Bucharest
20:15	Alexa (yellow card) 46'; Mărgăritescu (yellow card) 47'	(Report)	Stan 11', 36' (pen.), 60'; Tănase (yellow card) 44'; Gado (yellow card) 69'	Stadium: Dinamo; Attendance: 8,000; Referee: Vasile Bratu

17 March 2006 Matchday 17	Oțelul Galați	0–0	Politehnica Iași	Galați
15:30	Baciu (yellow card) 27'	(Report)	Ciobanu (yellow card) 29'; Iurișniți (yellow card) 43'; Bâlbă (yellow card) 60'	Stadium: Oțelul; Attendance: 8,000; Referee: Sorin Corpodean

24 March 2006 Matchday 18	FCM Bacău	0–4	Oțelul Galați	Bacău
	Trofin (yellow card) 6'; David (yellow card) 69'	(Report)	Bălțoi 10'; Tănase 45'; Vâtcă (yellow card) 49'; Costin (yellow card) 50'; Brujan 77'; Paraschiv 81'	Stadium: Municipal (Bacău); Attendance: 500; Referee: Cristian Balaj

2 April 2006 Matchday 19	Oțelul Galați	0–3	Steaua București	Galați
17:00		(Report)	Cristea 36', 90'; Rădoi 48' (pen.)	Stadium: Oțelul; Attendance: 15,000; Referee: Sebastian Colțescu

8 April 2006 Matchday 21	Oțelul Galați	1–0	Gloria Bistrița	Galați
17:00	Bălțoi (yellow card) 9'; Semeghin (yellow card) 43'; Stan 65'	(Report)	Radu (yellow card) 10'; Nalați (yellow card) 31'	Stadium: Oțelul; Attendance: 5,000; Referee: Robert Dumitru

12 April 2006 Matchday 22	CFR Cluj	0–1	Oțelul Galați	Cluj-Napoca
17:00	Minteuan (yellow card) 62'; Mijin (yellow card) 74'; Toma (yellow card) 75' (yellow-red card) 81'	(Report)	Costin (yellow card) 37'; Semeghin 44', (yellow card) 78'; Apostol (yellow card) 57'; Brujan (yellow card) 81'	Stadium: Dr. Constantin Rădulescu; Attendance: 2,000; Referee: Cristian Balaj

15 April 2006 Matchday 23	Oțelul Galați	2–3	Sportul Studențesc	Galați
17:00	Paraschiv (yellow card) 18', (goal) 61'; Bălțoi 70'; Bădescu (yellow card) 74'	(Report)	Nae 36'; Mazilu 78', (yellow card) 89'; Bălan 83'	Stadium: Oțelul; Attendance: 4,000; Referee: Ionică Serea

19 April 2006 Matchday 20	Rapid București	4–0	Oțelul Galați	Bucharest
21:00	Niculae 10'; Grigore 20'; Burdujan 23'; Moldovan 77'	(Report)		Stadium: Giulești – Valentin Stănescu; Attendance: 4,000; Referee: Sorin Corpodean

22 April 2006 Matchday 24	Jiul Petroșani	0–3	Oțelul Galați	Petroșani
17:30	Ilin (yellow card) 79'	(Report)	Stan (yellow card) 12', (goal) 56', 64'; Bălțoi 90+2'	Stadium: Jiul; Attendance: 5,000; Referee: Alexandru Tudor

30 April 2006 Matchday 25	Oțelul Galați	1–1	SC Vaslui	Galați
16:30	Costin (yellow card) 24'; Semeghin (yellow card) 80'; Tănase 90+2'	(Report)	Croitoru (yellow card) 12'; Sfârlea 30'; Baicu (yellow card) 90+1'	Stadium: Oțelul; Attendance: 6,000; Referee: Alexandru Deaconu

7 May 2006 Matchday 26	FC Argeș	0–5	Oțelul Galați	Mioveni
17:00	Crivac (yellow card) 13'; Tănasă (yellow card) 87'; Prepeliță (yellow card) 90+1'	(Report)	Paraschiv 13'; Stan 20'; Dobre (yellow card) 28'; Nogo (yellow card) 50'; Bălțoi 60', 90'; Gado 65'	Stadium: Dacia; Attendance: 5,000; Referee: Augustus Constantin

13 May 2006 Matchday 27	Oțelul Galați	2–0	Progresul București	Galați
18:00	Costin (yellow card) 28'; Tănase (yellow card) 60'; Bălțoi 63'; Semeghin (yellow card) 70'; Crăciun 84'	(Report)	Iancu (red card) 59'; Ninu (yellow card) 69'	Stadium: Oțelul; Attendance: 5,000; Referee: Ciprian Danșa

20 May 2006 Matchday 28	FC Timișoara	0–2	Oțelul Galați	Timișoara
17:00	Popa (yellow card) 20'; Olah (yellow card) 25'; Soporan (yellow card) 63'	(Report)	Semeghin (yellow card) 9'; Tănase 64' (pen.); Elek 87'	Stadium: Dan Păltinișanu; Attendance: 3,000; Referee: Andrei Ioniță

3 June 2006 Matchday 29	Farul Constanța	0–1	Oțelul Galați	Constanța
17:00		(Report)	Tănase (yellow card) 66', (goal) 73'; Semeghin (yellow card) 67'	Stadium: Farul; Attendance: 2,000; Referee: Marius Martiș

7 June 2006 Matchday 30	Oțelul Galați	1–1	Pandurii Târgu Jiu	Galați
17:00	Costin (yellow card) 36'; Crăciun 63'	(Report)	Popescu (yellow card) 19'; Naicu 54'	Stadium: Oțelul; Attendance: 4,000; Referee: Viorel Sandu

=== Cupa României ===
20 September 2005 Round of 32	Gaz Metan Mediaș	0–0 (a.e.t.) (2–4 p)	Oțelul Galați	Mediaș
16:00		(Report)		Stadium: Municipal; Referee: Victor Stănișteanu
	Penalties
	? (penalty missed) ? (penalty missed) ? (penalty scored) ? (penalty scored)		(penalty scored) Munteanu; (penalty scored) Șomcherechi; (penalty scored) Oprea; (penalty scored) Balauru

25 October 2005 Round of 16	Pandurii Târgu Jiu	0–2	Oțelul Galați	Mogoșoaia
11:00		(Report)	Munteanu 17' (pen.), 20'	Stadium: Complexul Sportiv; Attendance: 200; Referee: Daniel Deca

7 December 2005 Quarter-finals	Oțelul Galați	0–0 (a.e.t.) (3–4 p)	Progresul	Urziceni
13:00	Mărginean (yellow card) 118'	(Report)	Bundea (yellow card) 44'; M. Oprea (yellow card) 98'	Stadium: Tineretului; Attendance: 2,000; Referee: Cristian Balaj
	Penalties
	Munteanu (penalty scored); Balauru (penalty missed); Crăciun (penalty scored); Izvoranu (penalty scored); Zeciu (penalty missed)		(penalty scored) Liță; (penalty scored) M. Oprea; (penalty scored) I. Savu; (penalty missed) Bundea; (penalty scored) M. Savu

== Players ==
=== Squad statistics ===
				Total			Divizia A		Cupa României	
No.	Pos.	Nat.	Name	Sts	App	Gls	App	Gls	App	Gls
0	FW	(Romania)	Aldea	10	12	2	11	2	1	
0	FW	(Romania)	Alexandru	2	9		7		2	
0	FW	(Romania)	Apetrei		3		3			
0	MF	(Romania)	Apostol	9	10		10			
0	DF	(Romania)	Baciu	15	15		15			
0	MF	(Romania)	Bădescu	19	32	1	30	1	2	
0	MF	(Romania)	Balauru	8	10	1	7	1	3	
0	FW	(Romania)	Bălțoi	11	11	6	11	6		
0	GK	(Romania)	Barbu	3	3		2		1	
0	MF	(Romania)	Brujan	9	13	1	13	1		
0	DF	(Romania)	Costin	14	14		14			
0	MF	(Romania)	Crăciun	22	30	3	28	3	2	
0	FW	(Romania)	D.Oprea	2	7		6		1	
0	DF	(Romania)	Dobre	4	5		5			
0	DF	(Romania)	Dragomir	8	8		8			
0	DF	(Romania)	Dumitru	4	4		3		1	
0	FW	(Romania)	Elek		4	1	4	1		
0	MF	(Romania)	Gado	5	8	1	8	1		
0	DF	(Romania)	Ghidarcea	10	12	1	9	1	3	
0	MF	(Romania)	Ilie		2		1		1	
0	DF	(Romania)	Izvoranu	17	17		14		3	
0	MF	(Romania)	Macare	8	12	1	10	1	2	
0	DF	(Romania)	Mărginean	17	25		22		3	
0	DF	(Romania)	Munteanu	16	16	3	13	1	3	2
0	MF	(Romania)	Neculai	2	5		4		1	
0	DF	(Burkina Faso)	Nogo	9	9		9			
0	MF	(Romania)	Paraschiv	15	15	3	15	3		
0	DF	(Romania)	Purgariu		1		1			
0	FW	(Romania)	R. Oprea	5	13		10		3	
0	DF	(Brazil)	Rancan	2	5		5			
0	DF	(Romania)	Semeghin	13	13	1	13	1		
0	DF	(Romania)	Șomcherechi	10	10		9		1	
0	DF	(Romania)	Șomodean	9	14		12		2	
0	FW	(Romania)	Stan	12	12	7	12	7		
0	GK	(Romania)	Stanciu	3	3		3			
0	MF	(Romania)	Tănase	23	24	5	23	5	1	
0	FW	(Romania)	Ungureanu		2		1		1	
0	GK	(Romania)	Urai	12	13		11		2	
0	FW	(Colombia)	Valencia	3	5		4		1	
0	GK	(Romania)	Vâtcă	15	15		15			
0	DF	(Armenia)	Zeciu	17	17		15		2	

Last updated: 2009-03-08
Source: official website, Soccer Terminal and Viața Liberă
Ordered by player name
0 shown as blank

=== Transfers ===
==== In ====
No.	Pos.	Nat.	Name	Age	EU	Moving from	Type	Transfer window	Ends	Transfer fee	Source
–	GK	(Romania)	Stanciu	25	EU	Zimbru Chișinău (Moldova)	Transfer	Summer		Undisclosed	
–	MF	(Romania)	Șomcherechi	26	EU	Argeș Pitești	Transfer	Summer		Undisclosed	
–	DF	(Romania)	Dumitru	28	EU	Politehnica Timișoara	Loan	Summer		–	
–	GK	(Romania)	Urai	30	EU	Diósgyőri (Hungary)	Transfer	Summer		Free	
–	DF	(Romania)	Șomodean	21	EU	Gloria Bistrița	Transfer	Summer		Free	
–	FW	(Romania)	Oprea	20	EU	Unirea Alba Iulia	Transfer	Summer		Undisclosed	
–	FW	(Colombia)	Valencia	25	Non-EU	Fénix (Uruguay)	Transfer	Summer		Free	
–	MF	(Romania)	Brujan	29	EU	Brașov	Transfer	Winter		Undisclosed	
–	DF	(Brazil)	Rancan	24	Non-EU	Internacional (SP) (Brazil)	Transfer	Winter		Undisclosed	
–	MF	(Romania)	Gado	23	EU	Bihor Oradea	Transfer	Winter		€15,000	
–	GK	(Romania)	Vâtcă	23	EU	Bihor Oradea	Transfer	Winter		€15,000	
–	GK	(Romania)	Stan	27	EU	Bihor Oradea	Transfer	Winter		€40,000	
–	FW	(Romania)	Elek	17	EU	Câmpina	Transfer	Winter		€6,000	
–	DF	(Romania)	Dobre	30	EU	Argeș Pitești	Transfer	Winter	2008	€25,000	
–	DF	(Burkina Faso)	Nogo	19	Non-EU	Ouagadougou (Burkina Faso)	Transfer	Winter		Undisclosed	
–	GK	(Romania)	Stelea	38	EU	Akratitos (Greece)	Transfer	Winter		Undisclosed	
–	DF	(Romania)	Semeghin	26	EU	Hapoel Petah Tikva (Israel)	Loan	Winter		Undisclosed	
–	DF	(Romania)	Costin	27	EU	Gloria Bistrița	Transfer	Winter		Undisclosed	–
–	DF	(Romania)	Baciu	30	EU	Panserraikos (Greece)	Transfer	Winter		Free	
–	FW	(Romania)	Bălțoi	23	EU	Dinamo București	Loan	Winter		Free	
–	MF	(Romania)	Apostol	25	EU	Farul Constanța	Loan	Winter		Undisclosed	
–	MF	(Romania)	Paraschiv	27	EU	Petrolul Ploiești	Transfer	Winter		Undisclosed	
–	FW	(Romania)	Apetrei	24	EU	Jiul Petroșani	Transfer	Winter		Undisclosed	–

==== Out ====
No.	Pos.	Nat.	Name	Age	EU	Moving to	Type	Transfer window	Transfer fee	Source
–	GK	(Romania)	Cernea	29	EU	Petrolul Ploiești	Loan end	Summer	–	
–	MF	(Romania)	Mozacu	28	EU	Progresul București	Transfer	Summer	Undisclosed	
–	MF	(Romania)	Toporan	26	EU	Petrolul Ploiești	Loan end	Summer	–	
–	FW	(Romania)	Iacob	24	EU	Steaua București	Contract expired	Summer	–	
–	MF	(Romania)	Rohat	30	EU	Argeș Pitești	Contract expired	Summer	–	
–	DF	(Romania)	Nanu	36	EU		Contract expired	Summer	–	
–	DF	(Romania)	Tudose	18	EU	Steaua București	Contract expired	Summer	–	
–	FW	(Colombia)	Valencia	25	Non-EU		Released	Summer	Undisclosed	
–	FW	(Romania)	Oprea	33	EU		Released	Summer	Undisclosed	
–	DF	(Romania)	Șomcherechi	32	EU		Released	Summer	Undisclosed	
–	DF	(Romania)	Dragomir	31	EU		Released	Summer	Undisclosed	
–	DF	(Romania)	Dumitru	28	EU	Politehnica Timișoara	Loan end	Summer	–	
–	GK	(Romania)	Urai	30	EU	Minerul Lupeni	Released	Winter	Undisclosed	
–	GK	(Romania)	Stanciu	26	EU		Released	Winter	Undisclosed	
–	DF	(Armenia)	Zeciu	28	Non-EU		Released	Winter	Undisclosed	
–	MF	(Romania)	Balauru	25	EU		Released	Winter	Undisclosed	
–	FW	(Romania)	Alexandru	28	EU		Released	Winter	Undisclosed	
–	DF	(Romania)	Munteanu	27	EU	Khazar Lankaran (Azerbaijan)	Transfer	Winter	Undisclosed	
–	DF	(Romania)	Izvoranu	23	EU	Politehnica Timișoara	Transfer	Winter	$0.3M	
–	DF	(Romania)	Ghidarcea	27	EU	Câmpina	Loan	Winter	Undisclosed	
–	FW	(Romania)	Aldea	24	EU		Mutual consent	Winter	Undisclosed	

EU = if holds or not a European Union passport; Country: when 2 flags, 1st flag = country that plays for internationally, 2nd flag = country of birth; N = number on jersey; P = Position (for position name, pause mouse pointer on abbreviation); Name = Name on jersey (for more extensive name, pause mouse pointer on name); Age = age on the day of the signing; Moving from = only indicate the club the player was playing before start playing for this club in this season, for the type of the moving see Status column; Moving to = only indicates the club the player is going to play next, for the type of the moving see Status column; Ends = when the player's current contract ends; n/a = Not applicable.
