= 2004–05 FC Oțelul Galați season =

FC Oțelul
2004–05 season
- Chairman: Nicu Boghici (until Jan 15, 2005); Viorel Anghelinei (from Jan 15, 2005)
- Manager: Sorin Cârţu (until Dec 15, 2004); Mihai Stoichiţă (from Jan 23, 2005)
- Divizia A: 8th
- Cupa României: Quarter-finals
- UEFA Cup: 2nd qual. round
- Top goalscorer: League: Iacob (13); All: Iacob (16); Bădescu (3); Munteanu (3); Aldea (2)

In December 2004, with 2 months left on his contract, Sorin Cârţu and president Nicu Boghici agreed for a departure. January 2005 came with rumors which said that Mittal Steel would take over the team, for which they already were shirt sponsors. Soon after, Viorel Anghelinei, former player of Oțelul and referee, was appointed as the new president of the club. The new manager of Oțelul, Mihai Stoichiţă was announced on 23 January.

== Competitions ==
=== Friendlies ===
| 30 June 2004 | Progresul București | 0–3 | Oțelul Galați | Braşov |
| | | (Report) | Danciu; Oprea, |

| 3 July 2004 | Sportul Studenţesc | 1–2 | Oțelul Galați | Braşov |
| | Bălan | (Report) | Tănase; Danciu |

| 10 July 2004 | Midia Năvodari | 0–1 | Oțelul Galați | Constanţa |
| | | (Report) | Negru 35' | Stadium: Farul |

| 6 February 2005 Greece | Aris Thessaloniki (Greece) | 1–0 | (Romania) Oțelul Galați | Thessaloniki |
| | ? 85' | (Report) |

| 8 February 2005 Greece | Iraklis (Greece) | 0–2 | (Romania) Oțelul Galați | Thessaloniki |
| 15:00 | | (Report) | Munteanu 70'; Tănase 85' |

| 12 February 2005 Greece | Gloria Bistriţa (Romania) | 0–2 | (Romania) Oțelul Galați | Thessaloniki |
| 12:00 | | (Report) | Mozacu 65'; Iacob 75' |

| 15 February 2005 Greece | Arheiras (Greece) | 0–7 | (Romania) Oțelul Galați | Thessaloniki |
| | | (Report) | Mozacu,, Marius Macare; Crăciun; Izvoranu; Tănase (?) |

| 17 February 2005 | Conpet Ploieşti | 1–2 | Oțelul Galați | Ploieşti |
| | ? | (Report) | Tănase 40' (pen.); Alexandru 60' |

| 19 February 2005 | Petrolul Ploieşti | 0–2 | Oțelul Galați | Ploieşti |
| | | (Report) | Izvoranu 30'; Alexandru 71' | Stadium: Ilie Oană |

| 23 February 2005 | CF Brăila | 0–2 | Oțelul Galați | Brăila |
| | | (Report) | Oprea 30'; Alexandru 90' | Stadium: Progresul |

| 26 February 2005 | Dunărea Galați | 0–3 | Oțelul Galați | Smârdan, Galați |
| 11:00 | | (Report) | Bădescu 4'; Iacob 11'; Tănase 57' (pen.) |

| 5 March 2005 | CF Brăila | 1–2 | Oțelul Galați | Brăila |
| 11:00 | Dorobanţu 89' | (Report) | Balauru 17'; Alexandru 18' |

=== UEFA Cup ===
| 15 July 2004 1st QR 1st leg | Oțelul Galați (Romania) | 4–0 | (Albania) Dinamo Tirana | Constanţa |
| 20:00 | Negru 10'; Nanu 17'; Iacob 26'; Apostol 44', (yellow card) 44' | (Report) | Dhëmbi (yellow card) 45' | Stadium: Farul; Attendance: 1,000; Referee: (Bosnia and Herzegovina) Siniša Zrnić |

| 29 July 2004 1st QR 2nd leg | Dinamo Tirana (Albania) | 1–4 | (Romania) Oțelul Galați | Tirana |
| 19:00 | Rigers Qosja 23'; Poçi (yellow card) 63' | (Report) | Danciu 21' (pen.), 80'; Rohat 37'; Aldea 69' | Stadium: Qemal Stafa; Attendance: 100; Referee: (Andorra) José Luis Mengual Prades |

| 12 August 2004 2nd QR 1st leg | Oțelul Galați (Romania) | 0–0 | (Serbia and Montenegro) FK Partizan | Constanţa |
| 20:00 | Nanu (yellow card) 18'; Oprea (yellow card) 21'; Cernea (yellow card) 40' | (Report) | Rnić (yellow card) 47' (yellow-red card) 73'; Ilić (yellow card) 55' | Stadium: Farul; Attendance: 2,000; Referee: (Austria) Fritz Stuchlik |

| 26 August 2004 2nd QR 2nd leg | FK Partizan (Serbia and Montenegro) | 1–0 | (Romania) Oțelul Galați | Belgrade |
| 20:30 | Milović (yellow card) 22'; Radonjić 29'; Brnović (yellow card) 63'; Radović (yellow card) 65' | (Report) | Mozacu (yellow card) 15'; Crăciun (yellow card) 67'; Cernea (yellow card) 76' | Stadium: Partizan; Attendance: 15,000; Referee: (Spain) Eduardo Iturralde González |

=== Liga 1 ===
==== League table ====
| Pos | Team | Pld | W | D | L | GF | GA | GD | Pts |
|---|---|---|---|---|---|---|---|---|---|
| 6 | Politehnica Timișoara | 30 | 13 | 6 | 11 | 37 | 34 | +3 | 45 (Note: TIM 2–0 SPO; SPO 0–0 TIM) |
| 7 | Sportul Studențesc București | 30 | 12 | 9 | 9 | 37 | 27 | +10 | 45 |
| 8 | Oțelul Galați | 30 | 12 | 4 | 14 | 33 | 44 | −11 | 40 |
| 9 | Politehnica Iași | 30 | 10 | 8 | 12 | 28 | 41 | −13 | 38 |
| 10 | Argeș Pitești | 30 | 8 | 12 | 10 | 32 | 37 | −5 | 36 (Note: ARG 2–0 CFR; CFR 1–1 ARG) |

Source: LT (in Romanian)
Rules for classification: 1) points; 2) head-to-head points; 3) head-to-head goal difference; 4) head-to-head goals scored; 5) goal difference; 6) number of goals scored.

==== Results by round ====
| Round | 1 | 2 | 3 | 4 | 5 | 6 | 7 | 8 | 9 | 10 | 11 | 12 | 13 | 14 | 15 | 16 | 17 | 18 | 19 | 20 | 21 | 22 | 23 | 24 | 25 | 26 | 27 | 28 | 29 | 30 |
|---|---|---|---|---|---|---|---|---|---|---|---|---|---|---|---|---|---|---|---|---|---|---|---|---|---|---|---|---|---|---|
| Ground | A | H | A | H | A | H | A | H | H | A | H | A | H | A | H | H | A | H | A | H | A | H | A | A | H | A | H | A | H | A |
| Result | L | L | L | W | L | W | L | W | W | L | W | L | W | D | D | W | D | D | L | W | L | W | L | L | W | W | L | L | L | W |
| Position | 15 | 15 | 15 | 14 | 11 | 11 | 14 | 10 | 9 | 10 | 9 | 10 | 8 | 9 | 8 | 7 | 7 | 7 | 9 | 6 | 8 | 8 | 8 | 8 | 8 | 8 | 8 | 8 | 8 | 8 |

Source: Matches
A = Away; H = Home; W = Win; D = Draw; L = Loss

==== Results summary ====
| Overall | | | | | | | | Home | | | | | | Away | | | | | |
| Pld | W | D | L | GF | GA | GD | Pts | W | D | L | GF | GA | GD | W | D | L | GF | GA | GD |
|---|---|---|---|---|---|---|---|---|---|---|---|---|---|---|---|---|---|---|---|
| 30 | 12 | 4 | 14 | 31 | 32 | −1 | 40 | 10 | 2 | 3 | 16 | 8 | +8 | 2 | 2 | 11 | 15 | 24 | −9 |

==== Matches ====
| 1 August 2004 Matchday 1 | FCM Bacău | 1–0 | Oțelul Galați | Bacău |
| 20:00 | Goian (yellow card) 43'; Tănasă 59'; Lovin (yellow card) 86'; Croitoru (yellow card) 89' | (Report) | Danciu (yellow card) 67'; Munteanu (yellow card) 85' | Stadium: Municipal; Attendance: 5,000; Referee: Augustus Constantin |

| 7 August 2004 Matchday 2 | Oțelul Galați | 1–2 | FC Argeş | Ploieşti |
| 20:00 | Danciu (yellow card) 26' (yellow-red card) 86'; Munteanu (red card) 45'; Mărginean 64'; Nanu (yellow card) 71'; Gheară (yellow card) 73'; Mozacu (yellow card) 85' | (Report) | Sava 45' (pen.), (yellow card) 45'; Tănasă (yellow card) 54', (goal) 74'; Coman (yellow card) 61'; Dică (yellow card) 83'; Valerică Mircea Stan (yellow card) 87' | Stadium: Astra; Attendance: 400; Referee: Sebastian Colţescu |

| 21 August 2004 Matchday 4 | Oțelul Galați | 1–0 | Farul Constanţa | Galați |
| 18:00 | Iacob (yellow card) 6'; Aldea (yellow card) 29'; Mărginean (yellow card) 45'; Gheară 74'; Cernea (yellow card) 76' | (Report) | Paşcovici (yellow card) 16'; Mihai (yellow card) 60' | Stadium: Dunărea; Attendance: 10,000; Referee: Ionică Serea |

| 29 August 2004 Matchday 5 | FC Timişoara | 2–1 | Oțelul Galați | Timișoara |
| 20:00 | Voicu 4'; Constantinescu (yellow card) 9'; Poenaru 50' | (Report) | Tănase (yellow card) 5'; Aldea 85' | Stadium: Dan Păltinişanu; Attendance: 15,000; Referee: Alexandru Deaconu |

| 11 September 2004 Matchday 6 | Oțelul Galați | 1–0 | Sportul Studenţesc | Galați |
| 17:00 | Nanu (yellow card) 35'; Iacob 38', (yellow card) 90+4' | (Report) | Cruceru (yellow card) 70'; Bălan (yellow card) 83' | Stadium: Dunărea; Attendance: 3,000; Referee: Marian Salomir |

| 19 September 2004 Matchday 7 | Gloria Bistriţa | 3–0 | Oțelul Galați | Bistriţa |
| 17:00 | Coroian 47', 70'; Costin (yellow card) 56'; Cornea 83' | (Report) | Danciu (yellow card) 24' (yellow-red card) 65'; Munteanu (yellow card) 49'; Mărginean (yellow card) 61' | Stadium: Gloria; Attendance: 300; Referee: Anton Heleşteanu |

| 26 September 2004 Matchday 8 | Oțelul Galați | 1–0 | Politehnica Iaşi | Galați |
| 17:00 | Gheară (yellow card) 29'; Nanu (yellow card) 40'; Munteanu (yellow card) 64'; Crăciun 65'; Rohat (yellow card) 69'; Aldea (yellow card) 90+1' | (Report) | Toma (yellow card) 44' | Stadium: Dunărea; Attendance: 2,500; Referee: Alexandru Deaconu |

| 2 October 2004 Matchday 9 | Oțelul Galați | 1–0 | Rapid București | Galați |
| 15:00 | Călin (yellow card) 63'; Izvoranu (yellow card) 65'; Iacob 78', (yellow card) 88' | (Report) | | Stadium: Dunărea; Attendance: 5,000; Referee: Sorin Corpodean |

| 17 October 2004 Matchday 10 | Steaua București | 1–0 | Oțelul Galați | Bucharest |
| 20:45 | Neaga 69', (yellow card) 70'; Cristea (yellow card) 90' | (Report) | Tănase (yellow card) 30'; Oprea (yellow card) 45' | Stadium: Steaua; Attendance: 10,000; Referee: Sebastian Colţescu |

| 24 October 2004 Matchday 11 | Oțelul Galați | 2–0 | Apulum Alba Iulia | Galați |
| 15:00 | Munteanu 5', (yellow card) 15', (goal) 72'; Călin (red card) 18'; Mărginean (yellow card) 44' | (Report) | Dionisiu Miron Bumb (yellow card) 18'; Cristian Hardău (yellow card) 73' | Stadium: Dunărea; Attendance: 2,000; Referee: Marian Salomir |

| 31 October 2004 Matchday 12 | CFR Cluj | 1–0 | Oțelul Galați | Cluj-Napoca |
| 15:00 | Bruncević 88' (pen.) | (Report) | Izvoranu (yellow card) 19'; Aldea (yellow card) 37' | Stadium: Dr. Constantin Rădulescu; Attendance: 5,000; Referee: Sorin Corpodean |

| 3 November 2004 Matchday 3 | FC Brașov | 2–1 | Oțelul Galați | Braşov |
| 14:00 | Nicolae (yellow card) 26'; Dăscălescu 42'; Brujan 45'; Robert Barna Dani (yellow card) 47'; Claudiu Sărmăşan (yellow card) 50'; Surdu (yellow card) 84' | (Report) | Nanu (yellow card) 23'; Iacob (yellow card) 25'; Rohat 81' | Stadium: Silviu Ploieşteanu; Attendance: 300; Referee: Alexandru Deaconu |

| 6 November 2004 Matchday 13 | Oțelul Galați | 2–0 | Dinamo București | Galați |
| 14:00 | Iacob 27'; Mărginean (yellow card) 48'; Aldea (yellow card) 68'; Danciu (yellow card) 73'; Tănase (yellow card) 74'; Rohat (yellow card) 77'; Badea 83' (o.g.) | (Report) | Petre (yellow card) 79'; Grigorie (yellow card) 83' | Stadium: Dunărea; Attendance: 3,000; Referee: Ionică Serea |

| 20 November 2004 Matchday 14 | Naţional București | 0–0 | Oțelul Galați | Bucharest |
| 15:00 | Srhoj (yellow card) 33'; Savu (yellow card) 72' | (Report) | Crăciun (yellow card) 49' | Stadium: Cotroceni; Attendance: 300; Referee: Cristian Balaj |

| 27 November 2004 Matchday 15 | Oțelul Galați | 0–0 | Universitatea Craiova | Galați |
| 14:00 | Macare (yellow card) 69'; Iacob (yellow card) 70'; Crăciun (yellow card) 76' | (Report) | Bundea (yellow card) 15'; Dobre (yellow card) 63'; Daouda (yellow card) 90' | Stadium: Dunărea; Attendance: 1,000; Referee: Augustus Constantin |

| 12 March 2005 Matchday 16 | Oțelul Galați | 1–0 | FCM Bacău | Galați |
| 15:00 | Munteanu 52'; Nanu (yellow card) 83' | (Report) | Tănasă (yellow card) 11'; Geamăn (yellow card) 22'; Ganea (yellow card) 61' | Stadium: Dunărea; Attendance: 5,000; Referee: Alexandru Deaconu |

| 20 March 2005 Matchday 17 | FC Argeş | 1–1 | Oțelul Galați | Piteşti |
| 14:00 | Tănasă 38' | (Report) | Bădescu 13'; Ghidarcea (yellow card) 34' (yellow-red card) 75' | Stadium: Nicolae Dobrin; Attendance: 4,000; Referee: Marian Salomir |

| 3 April 2005 Matchday 18 | Oțelul Galați | 1–1 | FC Brașov | Galați |
| 16:00 | Iacob 65'; Oprea (yellow card) 65'; Munteanu (yellow card) 89' | (Report) | László Balint (yellow card) 35'; Bodea 90' | Stadium: Dunărea; Attendance: 2,000; Referee: Alexandru Tudor |

| 8 April 2005 Matchday 19 | Farul Constanţa | 2–0 | Oțelul Galați | Constanţa |
| 20:00 | Gurita 33'; Cristocea 56'; Farmache (yellow card) 61' | (Report) | Munteanu (yellow card) 7'; Rohat (yellow card) 35'; Crăciun (yellow card) 62' | Stadium: Farul; Attendance: 4,000; Referee: Sebastian Colţescu |

| 16 April 2005 Matchday 20 | Oțelul Galați | 1–0 | FC Timişoara | Galați |
| 17:00 | Izvoranu 6'; Tănase (yellow card) 19'; Crăciun (yellow card) 41'; Oprea (yellow card) 65'; Rohat (yellow card) 81'; Cernea (yellow card) 90+2' | (Report) | Stancu (yellow card) 31'; Petre (yellow card) 62'; Contra (yellow card) 65'; Rus (yellow card) 85'; Coman (yellow card) 87' | Stadium: Dunărea; Attendance: 8,000; Referee: Sorin Corpodean |

| 23 April 2005 Matchday 21 | Sportul Studenţesc | 3–2 | Oțelul Galați | Bucharest |
| 17:00 | Bucur 2', 17', 35' (pen.); Bălan (yellow card) 90+1'; Ferfelea (yellow card) 90+2' | Report) | Cernea (yellow card) 22'; Iacob 57'; Aldea 88' | Stadium: Regie; Attendance: 2,000; Referee: Anton Heleşteanu |

| 27 April 2005 Matchday 22 | Oțelul Galați | 2–1 | Gloria Bistriţa | Galați |
| 17:00 | Iacob 15', 18'; Aldea (yellow card) 16'; Izvoranu (red card) 87' | (Report) | Pelecaci 78' | Stadium: Dunărea; Attendance: 1,500; Referee: Sebastian Colţescu |

| 30 April 2005 Matchday 23 | Politehnica Iaşi | 1–0 | Oțelul Galați | Iaşi |
| 17:00 | Tiberiu Beceru (yellow card) 51'; Pârvu 59'; Baldovin (yellow card) 61'; Bâlbă (yellow card) 80'; Rednic (yellow card) 83' | (Report) | Bădescu (yellow card) 81' | Stadium: Emil Alexandrescu; Attendance: 8,000; Referee: Cristian Balaj |

| 4 May 2005 Matchday 24 | Rapid București | 3–0 | Oțelul Galați | Bucharest |
| 21:30 | Buga 11'; Burdujan 13'; Gane (yellow card) 37'; Stancu 74'; Moldovan (yellow card) 86' | (Report) | | Stadium: Giuleşti; Attendance: 6,000; Referee: Lucian Dan |

| 8 May 2005 Matchday 25 | Oțelul Galați | 1–0 | Steaua București | Galați |
| 17:00 | Bădescu 28'; Tănase (yellow card) 70'; Cernea (yellow card) 89' | (Report) | | Stadium: Dunărea; Attendance: 14,000; Referee: Sebastian Colţescu |

| 13 May 2005 Matchday 26 | Apulum Alba Iulia | 0–4 | Oțelul Galați | Alba Iulia |
| 18:00 | Constantin Dan Găldean (yellow card) 39'; Adrian Constantin Popescu (yellow card) 50'; Remus George Chivescu (yellow card) 58' | (Report) | Iacob 11', 22', (yellow card) 44', (goal) 54'; Balauru (yellow card) 57'; Oprea 73'; Izvoranu (yellow card) 75' | Stadium: Cetate; Attendance: 4,000; Referee: Tiberiu Lajos |

| 18 May 2005 Matchday 27 | Oțelul Galați | 1–2 | CFR Cluj | Galați |
| 17:00 | Izvoranu 39'; Mărginean (yellow card) 45'; Iacob (yellow card) 68' | (Report) | Jula 45' (pen.); Anca 76'; Ţurcaş (yellow card) 83' | Stadium: Dunărea; Attendance: 3,000; Referee: Alexandru Deaconu |

| 21 May 2005 Matchday 28 | Dinamo București | 4 – 0 | Oțelul Galați | Bucharest |
| 20:15 | Pacurar 16'; Bălţoi 20'; Niculescu 45'; 52' | (Report) | Rohat (yellow card) 44' | Stadium: Dinamo; Attendance: 3,000; Referee: Anton Heleşteanu |

| 28 May 2005 Matchday 29 | Oțelul Galați | 0–2 | Naţional București | Galați |
| 17:00 | Bădescu (yellow card) 36' | (Report) | Radu 37'; Chihaia (yellow card) 61'; Thwaite (yellow card) 78'; Savu (yellow card) 80'; Liţă 84' | Stadium: Dunărea; Attendance: 1,000; Referee: Victor Berbecaru |

| 11 June 2005 Matchday 30 | Universitatea Craiova | 0–6 | Oțelul Galați | Craiova |
| 17:00 | | (Report) | Iacob 3', 64', 77'; Bădescu 41'; Tănase 43'; Balauru (yellow card) 48'; Rohat (yellow card) 65'; Alexandru 73' | Stadium: Ion Oblemenco; Attendance: 200; Referee: Viorel Sandu |

=== Cupa României ===
| 13 October 2004 Round of 32 | FC Botoşani | 0–1 | Oțelul Galați | Botoşani |
| 14:00 | | (Report) | Iacob 22' | Stadium: Municipal; Attendance: 7,000; Referee: Aurelian Simion |

| 27 October 2004 Round of 16 | U. Cluj | 1–1 (a.e.t.) (4–5 p) | Oțelul Galați | Sfântu Gheorghe |
| 14:00 | Soporan 65' | (Report) | Munteanu 90' | Stadium: Municipal; Attendance: 1,000; Referee: Victor Berbecaru |
| | Penalties |
| | (penalty scored) M. Popescu; (penalty scored) Ţârlea; (penalty scored) Opriceană; (penalty scored) Abrudan (penalty missed) Soporan; (penalty missed) Giurgiu; (penalty missed) Damian; (penalty missed) Goga | | Tănase (penalty scored); Rohat (penalty scored); Danciu (penalty scored); Munteanu (penalty scored); Aldea (penalty scored) Oprea (penalty missed); Dragomir (penalty missed); Izvoranu (penalty missed) |

| 10 November 2004 Quarter-final 1st leg | Oțelul Galați | 1–2 | Farul Constanţa | Galați |
| 14:00 | Nanu (yellow card) 45'; Iacob (yellow card) 62', (goal) 74'; Aldea (yellow card) 70' | (Report) | Guriţă 10', 75'; Paşcovici (yellow card) 42' | Stadium: Dunărea; Attendance: 5,000; Referee: Alexandru Tudor |

| 1 December 2004 Quarter-final 2nd leg | Farul Constanţa | 2–0 | Oțelul Galați | Constanţa |
| 12:00 | Guriţă 20'; Mihai 36'; Şchiopu (yellow card) 43' | (Report) | Iacob (yellow card) 45'; Rohat (yellow card) 53'; Tudose (yellow card) 90' | Stadium: Farul; Attendance: 3,500; Referee: Marian Salomir |

== Players ==
=== Squad statistics ===
| | | | | Total | | | Divizia A | | Cupa României | | UEFA Cup | |
| No. | Pos. | Nat. | Name | Sts | App | Gls | App | Gls | App | Gls | App | Gls |
|---|---|---|---|---|---|---|---|---|---|---|---|---|
| – | FW | (Romania) | Aldea | 9 | 22 | 3 | 16 | 2 | 2 | | 4 | 1 |
| – | | (Romania) | Alexandru | | 3 | 1 | 3 | 1 | | | | |
| – | | (Romania) | Apostol | 1 | 1 | 1 | | | | | 1 | 1 |
| – | | (Romania) | Balauru | 5 | 11 | | 11 | | | | | |
| – | GK | (Romania) | Barbu | 16 | 17 | | 14 | | 3 | | | |
| – | | (Romania) | Bădescu | 13 | 15 | 3 | 15 | 3 | | | | |
| – | | (Romania) | Călin | 4 | 12 | | 10 | | 2 | | | |
| – | | (Romania) | Cernea | 22 | 22 | | 17 | | 1 | | 4 | |
| – | | (Romania) | Crăciun | 22 | 27 | 1 | 21 | 1 | 4 | | 2 | |
| – | | (Romania) | Danciu | 17 | 17 | 2 | 11 | | 2 | | 4 | 2 |
| – | | (Romania) | Dobre | 2 | 2 | | | | | | 2 | |
| – | | (Romania) | Dragomir | 23 | 29 | | 26 | | 2 | | 1 | |
| – | | (Romania) | Gheară | 7 | 10 | 1 | 7 | 1 | | | 3 | |
| – | | (Romania) | Ghidarcea | 6 | 6 | | 6 | | | | | |
| – | FW | (Romania) | Iacob | 35 | 35 | 16 | 28 | 13 | 3 | 2 | 4 | 1 |
| – | | (Romania) | Izvoranu | 22 | 31 | 2 | 25 | 2 | 4 | | 2 | |
| – | | (Romania) | Macare | 1 | 3 | | 2 | | 1 | | | |
| – | | (Romania) | Mărginean | 26 | 32 | 1 | 25 | 1 | 3 | | 4 | |
| – | | (Romania) | Mozacu | 12 | 27 | | 21 | | 4 | | 2 | |
| – | | (Romania) | Munteanu | 35 | 35 | 4 | 27 | 3 | 4 | 1 | 4 | |
| – | | (Romania) | Nanu | 28 | 29 | 1 | 22 | | 3 | | 4 | 1 |
| – | | (Romania) | Negru | 3 | 6 | 1 | 2 | | 2 | | 2 | 1 |
| – | | (Romania) | Nemţanu | | 1 | | 1 | | | | | |
| – | | (Romania) | Oprea | 19 | 31 | 1 | 24 | 1 | 3 | | 4 | |
| – | | (Romania) | Rohat | 37 | 37 | 2 | 29 | 1 | 4 | | 4 | 1 |
| – | | (Romania) | Tănase | 34 | 36 | 1 | 28 | 1 | 4 | | 4 | |
| – | | (Romania) | Toporan | 5 | 7 | | 5 | | 2 | | | |
| – | | (Romania) | Tudose | | 2 | | 1 | | 1 | | | |
| – | | (Armenia) | Zeciu | 14 | 14 | | 14 | | | | | |

Last updated: 11 March 2010
Source: RomanianSoccer and Viaţa Liberă
Ordered by player name
0 shown as blank

== Transfers ==
=== In ===
| No. | Pos. | Nat. | Name | Age | EU | Moving from | Type | Transfer window | Ends | Transfer fee | Source |
|---|---|---|---|---|---|---|---|---|---|---|---|
| – | LM | (Romania) | Tănase | 33 | EU | Argeș Pitești | Transfer | Summer | | Undisclosed | |
| – | RM | (Romania) | Crăciun | 31 | EU | Petrolul Ploiești | Transfer | Summer | | Undisclosed | |
| – | [[|S]] | (Romania) | Iacob | 23 | EU | Rapid București | Transfer | Summer | | Undisclosed | |
| – | CB | (Romania) | Nemţanu | 30 | EU | Progresul București | Transfer | Summer | | Undisclosed | |
| – | LB | (Romania) | Mozacu | 27 | EU | Brașov | Transfer | Summer | | Undisclosed | |
| – | CB | (Romania) | Toporan | 25 | EU | Petrolul Ploiești | Loan | Summer | | Undisclosed | |
| – | AM | (Romania) | Bădescu | 26 | EU | Naftex Burgas (Bulgaria) | Transfer | Winter | | Undisclosed | |
| – | CB | (Armenia) | Zeciu | 27 | EU | Pyunik (Armenia) | Transfer | Winter | | Undisclosed | |
| – | RB | (Romania) | Ghidarcea | 26 | EU | Laminorul | Transfer | Winter | | Undisclosed | |
| – | RM | (Romania) | Balauru | 24 | EU | Unirea Alba Iulia | Transfer | Winter | | Undisclosed | |
| – | [[|S]] | (Romania) | Alexandru | 27 | EU | Gloria Bistrița | Transfer | Winter | | Undisclosed | |
| – | MF | (Romania) | Scarlat | 21 | EU | Mechel | Transfer | Winter | 2005 | Undisclosed | |

=== Out ===
| No. | Pos. | Nat. | Name | Age | EU | Moving to | Type | Transfer window | Transfer fee | Source |
|---|---|---|---|---|---|---|---|---|---|---|
| – | [[|S]] | (Romania) | Ilie | 27 | EU | Universitatea Craiova | Transfer | Summer | Undisclosed | |
| – | CB | (Romania) | Ghionea | 25 | EU | Steaua București | Loan end | Summer | – | |
| – | WI | (Romania) | Orac | 19 | EU | Steaua București | Loan end | Summer | – | |
| – | RB | (Romania) | Toma | 28 | EU | | Released | Summer | – | |
| – | CB | (Romania) | Pelin | 35 | EU | | Released | Summer | – | |
| – | RM | (Romania) | Apostol | 23 | EU | Farul Constanța | Transfer | Summer | Undisclosed | |
| – | AM | (Romania) | Danciu | 27 | EU | Argeș Pitești | Transfer | Winter | Undisclosed | |
| – | [[|S]] | (Romania) | Negru | 28 | EU | Oltul Slatina | Transfer | Winter | Undisclosed | |
| – | AM | (Romania) | Călin | 31 | EU | | Released | Winter | – | |
| – | CB | (Romania) | Nemţanu | 31 | EU | | Released | Winter | – | |

EU = if holds or not a European Union passport; Country: when 2 flags, 1st flag = country that plays for internationally, 2nd flag = country of birth; N = number on jersey; P = Position (for position name, pause mouse pointer on abbreviation); Name = Name on jersey (for more extensive name, pause mouse pointer on name); Age = age on the day of the signing; Moving from = only indicate the club the player was playing before start playing for this club in this season, for the type of the moving see Status column; Moving to = only indicates the club the player is going to play next, for the type of the moving see Status column; Ends = when the player's current contract ends; n/a = Not applicable.
