= 2004–05 in Romanian football =

The 2004/05 season was one of the best seasons of Divizia A in the 21st century. Steaua București became champions of Romania and Dinamo București won the Romanian Cup and the Romanian Super Cup. Rapid won third place in Divizia A.

== Divizia A ==
Pos	Team	Pld	W	D	L	GF	GA	GD	Pts	Qualification or relegation
1	Steaua București (C)	30	19	6	5	47	18	+29	63	Qualification to Champions League second qualifying round
2	Dinamo București	30	20	2	8	60	30	+30	62	Qualification to UEFA Cup first round
3	Rapid București	30	16	9	5	51	27	+24	57 (Note: RAP 3–0 PRO; PRO 3–3 RAP)	Qualification to UEFA Cup first qualifying round
4	Național București	30	17	6	7	50	33	+17	57	
5	Farul Constanța	30	15	7	8	42	28	+14	52	
6	Politehnica Timișoara	30	13	6	11	37	34	+3	45 (Note: TIM 2–0 SPO; SPO 0–0 TIM)	
7	Sportul Studențesc București	30	12	9	9	37	27	+10	45	
8	Oțelul Galați	30	12	4	14	33	44	−11	40	
9	Politehnica Iași	30	10	8	12	28	41	−13	38	
10	Argeș Pitești	30	8	12	10	32	37	−5	36 (Note: ARG 2–0 CFR; CFR 1–1 ARG)	
11	CFR Cluj	30	9	9	12	31	32	−1	36	Qualification to Intertoto Cup first round
12	FCM Bacău	30	8	9	13	20	28	−8	33	
13	Gloria Bistrița	30	9	5	16	38	46	−8	32	Qualification to Intertoto Cup first round
14	Apulum Alba Iulia (R)	30	6	8	16	28	62	−34	26	Relegation to Divizia B
15	Brașov (R)	30	5	6	19	28	45	−17	21	Relegation to Divizia B
16	Universitatea Craiova (R)	30	4	8	18	24	54	−30	20	Relegation to Divizia B

Source: LT (in Romanian)
Rules for classification: 1) points; 2) head-to-head points; 3) head-to-head goal difference; 4) head-to-head goals scored; 5) goal difference; 6) number of goals scored.
(C) Champions; (R) Relegated

== European Cups ==
=== UEFA Champions League ===
==== Dinamo București ====
This section will cover Dinamo's games from July 28, 2004, until the start of August 25, 2004.

Date	Venue	Opponents	Score	Comp	Dinamo scorers	Match Report(s)
July 28, 2005	Pod Dubňom; Žilina, Slovakia	Mestsky Športovy Klub Žilina	0–1	UCL	Dănciulescu 91'	Romanian Soccer
August 4, 2005	Dinamo; Bucharest, Romania	Mestsky Športovy Klub Žilina	1–0	UCL	Dănciulescu 19'	Romanian Soccer
August 11, 2005	Naţional; Bucharest, Romania	Manchester United Football Club	1–2	UCL	Quinton Fortune (OG) 09'	Romanian Soccer
August 25, 2005	Old Trafford; Trafford, England	Manchester United Football Club	3–0	UCL	N/A	Romanian Soccer

=== UEFA Cup ===
==== Steaua București ====
This section will cover Steaua's games from August 12, 2004, until March 20, 2005.

Date	Venue	Opponents	Score	Comp	Steaua scorers	Match Report(s)
August 12, 2004	Mali Poljud; Belgrade, Serbia	Futbaliski Klub Železnik Beograd	2–4	UCUP	Opriţa 18', Neaga (24', 49'), Paraschiv 34'	Romanian Soccer
August 26, 2005	Ghencea Stadium; Bucharest, Romania	Futbaliski Klub Železnik Beograd	1–2	UCUP	Dică 79'	Romanian Soccer
September 16, 2004	Ghencea Stadium; Bucharest, Romania	Central Sports Club of Army Sofia	2–1	UCUP	Neaga 10', Dică 79'	Romanian Soccer
September 30, 2004	Bulgarska Armia; Sofia, Bulgaria	Central Sports Club of Army Sofia	2–2	UCUP	Opriţa 15', Paraschiv 79'	Romanian Soccer
October 21, 2004	Ghencea Stadium; Bucharest, Romania	Royal Standard Club de Liège	2–0	UCUP	Dragutinović (OG) 67', Neaga 80'	Romanian Soccer
November 4, 2004	Ennio Tardini; Parma, Italy	Parma Associazione Calcio	1–0	UCUP	N/A	Romanian Soccer
November 25, 2004	Ghencea Stadium; Bucharest, Romania	Beşiktaş J.K. Istanbul	2–1	UCUP	Neaga 3', Ciocoiu 19'	Romanian Soccer
December 1, 2004	San Mamés; Bilbao, Spain	Athletic Club de Bilbao	1–0	UCUP	N/A	Romanian Soccer
February 16, 2005	Mestalla; Valencia, Spain	Valencia Club de Fútbol	2–0	UCUP	N/A	Romanian Soccer
February 24, 2005	Ghencea Stadium; Bucharest, Romania	Valencia Club de Fútbol	2–0	UCUP	Cristea (50', 71')	Romanian Soccer
March 16, 2005	Ghencea Stadium; Bucharest, Romania	Villarreal Club de Fútbol	0–0	UCUP	N/A	Romanian Soccer
March 20, 2005	El Madrigal; Villarreal, Spain	Villarreal Club de Fútbol	2–0	UCUP	N/A	Romanian Soccer

==== Oţelul Galaţi ====
This section will cover Oţelul's games from July 15, 2004, until August 26, 2004.

Date	Venue	Opponents	Score	Comp	Otelul scorers	Match Report(s)
July 15, 2004	Gheorghe Hagi; Constanţa, Romania	Klubi Sportiv Dinamo Tiranë	4–0	UCUP	Negru 10', Nanu 17', Iacob 26', Apostol 44'	Romanian Soccer
July 29, 2004	Selman Stërmasi; Tirana, Albania	Klubi Sportiv Dinamo Tiranë	1–4	UCUP	Danciu (21' pen, 80'), Rohat 37', Aldea 69'	Romanian Soccer
August 12, 2004	Gheorghe Hagi; Constanţa, Romania	Futbaliski Klub Partizan Belgrade	0–0	UCUP	N/A	Romanian Soccer
August 26, 2004	Partizan; Belgrade, Serbia	Futbaliski Klub Partizan Belgrade	1–0	UCUP	N/A	Romanian Soccer

==== Dinamo București ====
This section will cover Dinamo's games from September 16, 2004, until September 30, 2004.

Date	Venue	Opponents	Score	Comp	Dinamo scorers	Match Report(s)
September 16, 2004	Partizan; Belgrade, Serbia	Futbaliski Klub Partizan Belgrade	3–1	UCUP	Dănciulescu 24'	Romanian Soccer
September 16, 2004	Naţional; Bucharest, Romania	Futbaliski Klub Partizan Belgrade	0–0	UCUP	N/A	Romanian Soccer

=== UEFA Intertoto Cup ===
==== Gloria Bistriţa ====
This section will cover Gloria's games from June 20, 2004, until June 27, 2004.

Date	Venue	Opponents	Score	Comp	Gloria scorers	Match Report(s)
June 20, 2004	Lachen; Thun, Switzerland	Fussball Club Thun	2–0	UCUP	N/A	Romanian Soccer
June 27, 2004	Gloria; Bistriţa, Romania	Fussball Club Thun	0–0	UCUP	N/A	Romanian Soccer

== Romania national team ==
This section will cover Romania's games from Football World Cup 2006 (qualification UEFA).

Date	Venue	Opponents	Score	Comp	Romania scorers	Match Report(s)
August 18, 2004	Giuleşti Stadium; Bucharest, Romania	Finland	2–1	WCQ06	Mutu 50', Petre 90'	Official Site
September 4, 2004	Ion Oblemenco; Craiova, Romania	North Macedonia	2–1	WCQ06	Pancu 15', Mutu 86'	Official Site
September 8, 2004	Estadi Communal; La Vella, Andorra	Andorra	1–5	WCQ06	Cernat 2', Pancu (5', 82'), Niculae (16', 70')	Official Site
October 9, 2004	Toyota Arena; Prague, Czech Republic	Czech Republic	1–0	WCQ06	N/A	Official Site
November 17, 2004	Republican; Yerevan, Armenia	Armenia	1–1	WCQ06	Marica 28'	Official Site
February 9, 2005	GSZ; Larnaka, Cyprus	Slovakia	2–2	F	Pancu 38' pen, Opriţa 89'	N/A
March 26, 2005	Giuleşti Stadium; Bucharest, Romania	Netherlands	0–2	WCQ06	N/A	Official Site
March 30, 2004	Gradski; Skopje, Macedonia	North Macedonia	1–2	WCQ06	Mitea (18', 58')	Official Site
May 24, 2004	Municipal; Bacău, Romania	Moldova	2–0	F	Niculescu 8', Dică 55'	N/A
June 4, 2005	De Kuip; Rotterdam, Netherlands	Netherlands	2–0	WCQ06	N/A	Official Site
June 8, 2005	Gheorghe Hagi; Constanţa, Romania	Armenia	3–0	WCQ06	O.Petre 28', Bucur (38', 78')	Official Site
