= List of Romanian football transfers 2008–09 =

This is a list of Romanian football transfers for the 2008–09 transfer windows. Only moves featuring at least one Liga I club are listed.

== Transfers ==
This list is incomplete. Please feel free to expand

Date	Name	Country	Moving from	Moving to	Fee
6 May 2008	János Székely	Romania	Oţelul Galaţi	Steaua	€1.5m
9 May 2008	Andrei Cristea	Romania	Poli Timişoara	Dinamo	Undisclosed
10 May 2008	Bogdan Stancu	Romania	Unirea Urziceni	Steaua	€1m
11 May 2008	Claudiu Ionescu	Romania	Gloria Buzău	Steaua	€250k
13 May 2008	Cristian Dănălache	Romania	UT Arad	Unirea Urziceni	€200k
14 May 2008	Robert Neagoe	Romania	Dacia Mioveni	Steaua	€200k
16 May 2008	Cristian Sánchez Prette	Argentina	C.A. Huracán	CFR Cluj	€1.1m
16 May 2008	Hugo Alcantara	Brazil	Belenenses	CFR Cluj	Free
19 May 2008	Gabriel Velcovici	Romania	U. Craiova	Gloria Bistriţa	€150k (with Ciucă)
19 May 2008	Mădălin Ciucă	Romania	U. Craiova	Gloria Bistriţa	€150k (with Velcovici)
21 May 2008	Georgian Păun	Romania	Dinamo II	Gloria Bistriţa	Loan
22 May 2008	Christian Sagna	Senegal	FC Petrolul Ploieşti	Gloria Buzău	Free
22 May 2008	Dino Eze	Nigeria	Steaua	Gloria Buzău	Free
22 May 2008	Ioan Hora	Romania	UT Arad	Gloria Bistriţa	€238k
24 May 2008	Sreten Sretenović	Serbia	S.L. Benfica	Poli Timişoara	€350k
24 May 2008	Csaba Borbely	Romania	FC Progresul	Gloria Bistriţa	Undisclosed
24 May 2008	Mihai Panc	Romania	FC Progresul	Gloria Bistriţa	Undisclosed
26 May 2008	Ciprian Tătăruşanu	Romania	Gloria Bistriţa	Steaua	€1.5m
26 May 2008	Rui Duarte	Portugal	Estrela da Amadora	FC Brașov	€300k
27 May 2008	Filipe da Costa	Portugal	Leeds United	Poli Timişoara	Free
27 May 2008	Pedro Taborda	Portugal	Naval 1º de Maio	Poli Timişoara	€400k
27 May 2008	Ionuţ Luţu	Romania	U. Craiova	FC Zhetysu	Free
29 May 2008	Gabriel Jula	Romania	Oţelul Galaţi	Energie Cottbus	€700k
29 May 2008	Tiago Gomes	Portugal	Estrela da Amadora	Steaua	€300k-Loan
2 June 2008	Roberto Iancu	Romania	FC Progresul	Farul Constanţa	Free
2 June 2008	Daniel Stan	Romania	Oţelul Galaţi	Unirea Urziceni	€150k
2 June 2008	Dan Matei	Romania	Gloria Bistriţa	Unirea Urziceni	Exchanged with Petre
2 June 2008	Ciprian Petre	Romania	Unirea Urziceni	Gloria Bistriţa	Exchanged with Matei
3 June 2008	Lucian Pârvu	Romania	Gloria Bistriţa	Farul Constanţa	Free
3 June 2008	Daniel Sabou	Romania	FC Vaslui	Gloria Bistriţa	€150k
3 June 2008	Radu Mărginean	Romania	CFR Cluj	Gloria Bistriţa	Free
3 June 2008	Adrian Nalaţi	Romania	Gloria Bistriţa	Pandurii Târgu Jiu	Undisclosed
3 June 2008	Cosmin Tilincă	Romania	Gloria Bistriţa	Pandurii Târgu Jiu	Undisclosed
5 June 2008	Sorin Frunză	Romania	FC Vaslui	Unirea Urziceni	€200k+Munteanu
5 June 2008	Daniel Munteanu	Romania	Unirea Urziceni	FC Vaslui	Part of Frunză fee
6 June 2008	Bogdan Stelea	Romania	Unirea Urziceni	FC Brașov	Free
7 June 2008	Florin Lazăr	Romania	Oţelul Galaţi	Gaz Metan Mediaş	Undisclosed
7 June 2008	Daniel Stan	Romania	Oţelul Galaţi	Unirea Urziceni	€150k
9 June 2008	Dorel Zaharia	Romania	UT Arad	FC Brașov	€100k
10 June 2008	Silviu Bălace	Romania	FC Vaslui	FC Brașov	Free
10 June 2008	Stanislav Genchev	Bulgaria	Litex Lovech	FC Vaslui	Undisclosed
11 June 2008	Jean Prunescu	Romania	Steaua II	Gloria Buzău	Loan
11 June 2008	Emil Ninu	Romania	Steaua	Gloria Buzău	Loan
11 June 2008	Alin Liţu	Romania	Steaua	Gloria Buzău	Loan
11 June 2008	Alexandru Tudose	Romania	Steaua	Gloria Buzău	Loan
11 June 2008	Eric Bicfalvi	Romania	Steaua	Gloria Buzău	Loan
11 June 2008	Robert Săceanu	Romania	U. Craiova	Gloria Buzău	Loan
12 June 2008	Youssouf Kamara	Ivory Coast	Sanita	FC Argeş	Undisclosed
12 June 2008	Valentin Stan	Moldova	Zimbru Chişinău	FC Argeş	Undisclosed
12 June 2008	Cătălin Munteanu	Romania	Dinamo București	FC Brașov	Free
12 June 2008	Constant Djapka	Ivory Coast	Pandurii Târgu Jiu	Bayer Leverkusen	€1.1m
12 June 2008	Alexandru Bălţoi	Romania	UTA	FC Brașov	Undisclosed
13 June 2008	Ilko Pirgov	Bulgaria	PFC CSKA Sofia	CS Otopeni	Undisclosed
13 June 2008	Adrian Iencsi	Romania	Apollon Limassol	CS Otopeni	Free
13 June 2008	Jose Luis Garcia	Argentina	Municipal Liberia	Poli Timişoara	Free
13 June 2008	Gabriel Cânu	Romania	Poli Timişoara	FC Vaslui	€350k (with Aliuţă)
13 June 2008	Marian Aliuţă	Romania	Poli Timişoara	FC Vaslui	€350k (with Cânu)
14 June 2008	Juliano Gonçalves Spadacio	Brazil	Nacional Madeira	Rapid	€1.7m
14 June 2008	William Amamoo	Ghana	CF Liberty Salonta	Gaz Metan Mediaş	Undisclosed
14 June 2008	Tarek Amer	Egypt	Free agent	Gloria Buzău	Free
14 June 2008	Dinu Todoran	Romania	Farul Constanţa	Unirea Urziceni	€300k
14 June 2008	Ricardo Manuel da Silva Fernandes	Portugal	Nacional Madeira	Rapid	€500k
14 June 2008	Jose Casanave	Argentina	Free agent	CFR Cluj	Free
14 June 2008	Mircea Gheorghe	Romania	Jiul Petroşani	Poli Iaşi	Undisclosed
16 June 2008	Dušan Kuciak	Slovakia	MŠK Žilina	FC Vaslui	Undisclosed
16 June 2008	Răzvan Stanca	Romania	Farul Constanţa	Pandurii Târgu Jiu	End of Loan
19 June 2008	Tibor Moldovan	Romania	Újpest FC	Farul Constanţa	End of Loan
19 June 2008	Lukáš Magera	Czech Republic	FC Baník Ostrava	Poli Timişoara	Undisclosed
19 June 2008	Lucian Pîrvu	Romania	Universitatea Craiova	Farul Constanţa	Free
19 June 2008	Roberto Iancu	Romania	FC Progresul București	Farul Constanţa	Free
21 June 2008	Rafael Pereira dos Santos	Brazil	Metropolitano	Gaz Metan	Free
21 June 2008	Robert Iacob	Romania	UTA	Gaz Metan	Free
21 June 2008	Alexandru Bălţoi	Romania	UTA	FC Brașov	Free
21 June 2008	Nuno Viveiros	Portugal	Estrela da Amadora	Poli Iaşi	Free
22 June 2008	Arthuro Henrique Bernhardt	Brazil	Deportivo Alavés	Steaua	€800k
24 June 2008	Casian Miclăuş	Romania	CFR Cluj	Gloria Bistriţa	Free
24 June 2008	Ştefan Radu	Romania	Dinamo	Lazio Roma	€5.4m
26 June 2008	Lucas Landa	Argentina	Gimnasia la Plata	Unirea Urziceni	Loan
26 June 2008	Dorin Goga	Romania	U Cluj	Poli Timişoara	€1.2m
26 June 2008	Yssouf Kone	Burkina Faso	Rosenborg BK	CFR Cluj	Undisclosed
26 June 2008	Gustavo Oberman	Argentina	CD Castellón	CFR Cluj	€500k
26 June 2008	Nemanja Jovanovic	Serbia	U Cluj	FC Vaslui	€275k
27 June 2008	Adrian Anca	Romania	CFR Cluj	Oţelul Galaţi	Free
27 June 2008	Jorge Tavares	Portugal	Olivais	Gloria Buzău	Free
27 June 2008	Luis Dias	Portugal	Olivais	Gloria Buzău	Free
27 June 2008	Tomislav Arcaba	Australia	Sligo Rovers	Gloria Buzău	Free
27 June 2008	Winston Parks	Costa Rica	LD Alajuelense	Poli Timişoara	Free
27 June 2008	José Moreno Mora	Colombia	Steaua	Independiente	End of loan
27 June 2008	Diogo Silva	Portugal	Olivais	Gloria Buzău	Free
28 June 2008	Gueye Mansour	Senegal	Poli Timişoara	Gloria Bistriţa	Free
28 June 2008	Nicolae Dică	Romania	Steaua	Calcio Catania	€2m
28 June 2008	Júlio César da Silva e Souza	Brazil	AEK Athens	Rapid	Undisclosed
