= Balauru =

Balauru is a surname. Notable people with the surname include:

- Dan Balauru (born 1980), Romanian footballer
- Dragoș Balauru (born 1989), Romanian footballer
