= Dragoș Balauru =

Romanian footballer

Personal information
- Date of birth: 11 November 1989 (age 36)
- Place of birth: Poroschia, Romania
- Height: 1.90 m (6 ft 3 in)
- Position: Goalkeeper

Youth career
- 2001–2005: CSȘ Alexandria
- 2005–2007: LPS Mircea Eliade București
- 2007–2008: Grup Școlar Agricol Nucet

Senior career*
Years	Team	Apps	(Gls)
2008–2009	AFC Filipeștii de Pădure		
2009–2010	CS Petrolul Videle		
2010	Snagov	12	(0)
2011–2013	FCM Târgu Mureș	31	(0)
2012	→ Universitatea Cluj (loan)	17	(0)
2013	Rapid București	1	(0)
2013–2014	Viitorul Constanța	31	(0)
2015–2018	Voluntari	71	(0)
2018	Daco-Getica București	6	(0)
2019	Levadiakos	0	(0)
2019	SCM Gloria Buzău	10	(0)
2020–2023	UTA Arad	24	(0)
2023–2024	CSM Alexandria	10	(0)
2024	Unirea Ungheni	0	(0)
Total		213	(0)
- * Club domestic league appearances and goals as of 13 April 2024

Dragoş Balauru (born 11 November 1989) is a Romanian footballer who plays as a goalkeeper for Liga II club CSM Alexandria, which he captains.

== Personal life ==
His brother, Dan Balauru is also a footballer.

== Honours ==
Voluntari

- Liga II: 2014–15
- Cupa României: 2016–17
- Supercupa României: 2017

UTA Arad

- Liga II: 2019–20
