= Mircea Oprea =

Romanian footballer

Personal information
- Full name: Mircea Vasile Oprea
- Date of birth: 20 April 1980 (age 46)
- Place of birth: Sibiu, Romania
- Height: 1.79 m (5 ft 10 1/2 in)
- Positions: Defender; striker

Senior career*
Years	Team	Apps	(Gls)
1996–1998	Apulum Alba Iulia	40	(8)
1999	Rocar București	11	(2)
2000	Dacia Mioveni	6	(3)
2000–2001	Fulgerul Bragadiru	26	(8)
2001–2002	AEK București	22	(3)
2002–2007	Politehnica Timișoara	84	(17)
2005–2006	→ Național București (loan)	26	(3)
2007–2008	Ceahlăul Piatra Neamț	31	(2)
2008–2009	Politehnica Iaşi	12	(0)
2009–2013	Unirea Alba Iulia	49	(0)
2016–2018	Unirea Alba Iulia		
Total		307	(46)

Managerial career
- 2017–2018: Unirea Alba Iulia (assistant)
- 2020–2021: Unirea Alba Iulia (assistant)
- 2021–2022: Unirea Alba Iulia (sporting director)
- 2022–: Unirea Alba Iulia (assistant)
- * Club domestic league appearances and goals as of 14:13, 8 November 2022 (UTC)~

Mircea Vasile Oprea (born 20 April 1980) is a Romanian former football player. After retiring, he played for a while handball at Unit Alba Iulia in the Romanian second league.
