= Dan Matei =

Romanian footballer

Personal information
- Full name: Dan Marian Matei
- Date of birth: 25 June 1981 (age 45)
- Place of birth: Cluj-Napoca, Romania
- Height: 1.81 m (5 ft 11 in)
- Positions: Centre back; midfielder

Senior career*
Years	Team	Apps	(Gls)
1998–2002	Universitatea Cluj	51	(1)
2002–2003	Gloria Bistrița	20	(0)
2004	IS Câmpia Turzii	12	(0)
2004–2005	Universitatea Cluj	11	(0)
2005–2008	Gloria Bistrița	77	(1)
2008–2010	Unirea Urziceni	0	(0)
2009–2010	→ Internațional (loan)	8	(0)
2010	→ Gloria Bistrița (loan)	13	(0)
2010–2012	Târgu Mureș	27	(2)
2012–2013	UTA Arad	12	(0)
2013–2014	Gloria Bistrița	12	(1)
2015–2021	Sănătatea Cluj	148	(10)
Total		391	(15)

Managerial career
- 2017–2021: Sănătatea Cluj (assistant)
- * Club domestic league appearances and goals as of 14:41, 5 October 2021 (UTC)

Dan Marian Matei (born 25 June 1981) is a Romanian former footballer who played as a centre back. In his career, Matei played for teams such as Universitatea Cluj, Gloria Bistrița, FCM Târgu Mureș, UTA Arad or Sănătatea Cluj.
