= Nicolae Mitea =

Romanian footballer

Personal information
- Date of birth: 24 March 1985 (age 41)
- Place of birth: Bucharest, Romania
- Height: 1.68 m (5 ft 6 in)
- Position: Winger

Youth career
- 1994–1997: FRB Titan București
- 1997–1998: Juventus București
- 1998–2001: Dinamo București
- 2001–2002: Rapid București

Senior career*
Years	Team	Apps	(Gls)
2002–2003	Dinamo București	9	(0)
2002–2003	→ Poiana Câmpina (loan)	5	(5)
2003–2008	Ajax	53	(12)
2008–2009	Dinamo București	12	(0)
2010–2011	Ionikos	0	(0)
2011–2012	Petrolul Ploiești	2	(1)
2013–2014	Concordia Chiajna	0	(0)
Total		81	(18)

International career
2002	Romania U19	3	(3)
2003–2006	Romania U21	18	(6)
2003–2005	Romania	8	(2)
- * Club domestic league appearances and goals

Nicolae Mitea (born 24 March 1985) is a Romanian former professional footballer who played as a winger. Between 2003 and 2005, he made eight appearances for the Romania national team, scoring two goals.

== Club career ==
=== Youth years ===
Mitea was born on 24 March 1985 in Bucharest, Romania and began playing junior-level football in 1994 at local club FRB Titan. In 1997 he joined Juventus București, one year later moving to Dinamo București, then in 2001, he switched teams again, going to Rapid București.

In 2002, Mitea and Roberto Iancu were taken by coach Ionuț Chirilă on a one-week trial at FC Barcelona, but despite leaving a good impression, they did not sign a contract because of some problems with their sports agent. Mitea was also taken by Chirilă at a trial at Mircea Lucescu's Galatasaray but again despite making a good impression he did not sign a contract.

=== Dinamo București ===
In 2002 he returned to Dinamo București where he started his senior career, making his Divizia A debut on 24 November when coach Cornel Dinu sent him in the 87th minute to replace Flavius Stoican in a 1–0 home victory over FC Brașov. On 27 November 2003, Dinu brought him on in the 79th minute to replace Ionel Dănciulescu in a 3–0 win in the derby against Steaua București in the Cupa României. Although the club won the trophy that season, new coach Ioan Andone did not play him in the 1–0 win over Național București in the final. In the same season, Mitea also played for the club's then satellite team Poiana Câmpina, helping it get promoted from the third to the second league.

=== Ajax ===
After having played only nine matches in the Romanian league, he was picked up by Dutch club Ajax which paid $720,000 for his transfer. Mitea made his Eredivisie debut on 13 September 2003 when coach Ronald Koeman sent him in the 77th minute to replace Tom Soetaers in a 4–1 home win over RKC Waalwijk. He scored his first goal on 5 October in a 3–1 away victory against FC Groningen, then he scored the decisive goal in a 2–1 win over rivals PSV Eindhoven. He also started playing in European competitions, making four appearances in the 2003–04 Champions League group stage. His first season at Ajax was a success as he, at the age of 18, was used by Koeman in 23 league matches in which he scored seven goals, helping the club win the title. In the following season he played again in the Champions League group stage, this time making six appearances and scoring once in a 2–2 draw against Bayern Munich. All these performances helped him earn the "2004 Ajax Talent of the Year" award.

His career development was set on hold due to a knee injury that sidelined him for a long time, resulting in only one appearance for Ajax in the 2005–06 season. In the following season, Mitea did not play regularly as manager Henk ten Cate chose to overlook him and he was no longer first choice for the left-wing position. Despite the lack of appearances in these two seasons he did add the 2006–07 KNVB Cup to his list of trophies. He played three games in the campaign and scored once in a 3–1 win over RKC Waalwijk, but remained an unused substitute in the victory against AZ Alkmaar in the final. Due to minor injuries and still being out of favor with Henk Ten Cate, and then temporary replacement coach Adrie Koster, Mitea did not play a single game for Ajax during the 2007–08 season. He was not in new coach Marco van Basten's plans and was told to look for a new club.

During his spell with the Sons of the Gods he was teammates with fellow Romanians Bogdan Lobonț and George Ogăraru, also developing a good friendship with Zlatan Ibrahimović. He appreciated very much Ronald Koeman, saying after he ended his career:"When I arrived at Ajax, Koeman was the coach. I liked him the most, I think we collaborated for 3–4 years. The practices he led were based on possession, everything was with the ball. It was a pleasure to be trained by him, he knew how not to stress you... At the same time, he was a strict, severe, but fair technician. He knew how to support me. I can say now, after so many years, that Ronald Koeman is my father in football. I debuted with him at Ajax, there were many matches in which he relied on me as a starter."

=== Return to Dinamo București ===
In August 2008, Mitea returned to Dinamo, coach Mircea Rednic saying about the transfer:"I agreed to this transfer, otherwise Mitea would not have come. With him on the field, Dinamo will increase in speed on both lanes". However, he did not manage to become an important player for the team, one year later terminating his contract with the club on a mutual agreement.

=== Late career ===
In August 2010, Mitea signed with Greece second league side Ionikos, but he made no appearances for the team. In the following summer he went back to Romania at Petrolul Ploiești where he worked with coach Valeriu Răchită. He made his debut for The Yellow Wolves when he was sent to replace Valentin Negru in the final minutes of a 1–0 loss to Rapid București, this being his first appearance in a football match after over two years of absence. In his second and last league appearance for the club and for him, Mitea scored his only goal in Romanian top-league football in the 5–1 loss against his former team, Dinamo.

In July 2013, his former youth coach Ionuț Chirilă, who was head coach at Concordia Chiajna, brought Mitea to the club. However, in February 2014 he left without playing a single game due to physical condition issues, subsequently retiring at age 28.

== International career ==
From 2002 to 2006, Mitea was consistently featured for Romania's under-19 and under-21 sides.

He played eight games and scored two goals for Romania, making his debut on 20 August 2003 when coach Anghel Iordănescu sent him in the 83rd minute to replace Adrian Mutu in a friendly that ended with a 2–0 away win against Ukraine. Mitea's last three matches for the national team were in the 2006 World Cup qualifiers, and in the first of these, he scored a double in a 2–1 victory over Macedonia. The following two were a loss to the Netherlands and a win against Armenia.

== Career statistics ==
=== Club ===
Appearances and goals by club, season and competition
Club	Season	League			Cup		Europe		Other		Total		Ref.
Club	Season	Division	Apps	Goals	Apps	Goals	Apps	Goals	Apps	Goals	Apps	Goals	Ref.
Dinamo București	2002–03	Liga I	9	0	1	0	0	0	–		10	0	
Poiana Câmpina (loan)	2002–03	Liga III	5	5			–		–		5	5	
Ajax	2003–04	Eredivisie	23	7	1	0	4 (Note: Appearances in the UEFA Champions League)	0	–		28	7	
Ajax	2004–05	Eredivisie	21	2	0	0	6	1	–		27	3	
Ajax	2005–06	Eredivisie	1	0	2	0	0	0	1 (Note: Appearances in Eredivisie play-offs)	1	4	1	
Ajax	2006–07	Eredivisie	8	2	3	1	1 (Note: Appearance in the UEFA Cup)	0	4	0	16	3	
Ajax	2007–08	Eredivisie	0	0	0	0	0	0	0	0	0	0	
Ajax	Total		53	11	6	1	11	1	5	1	75	14	–
Dinamo București	2008–09	Liga I	12	0	2	0	1 (Note: Appearance in the UEFA Europa League)	0	–		15	0	
Ionikos	2010–11	Super League Greece 2	0	0	0	0	–		–		0	0	
Petrolul Ploiești	2011–12	Liga I	2	1	1	1	–		–		3	2	
Concordia Chiajna	2013–14	Liga I	0	0	0	0	–		–		0	0	
Total			81	18	10	1	12	1	5	1	108	21	–

=== International stats ===
Appearances and goals by national team and year
National team	Year	Apps	Goals
Romania	2003	2	0
Romania	2004	2	0
Romania	2005	4	2
Total		8	2

Scores and results list Romania's goal tally first, score column indicates score after each Mitea goal.

List of international goals scored by Nicolae Mitea
No.	Date	Venue	Opponent	Score	Result	Competition
1	30 March 2005	Stadion Gradski Park, Skopje, North Macedonia	Macedonia	1–0	2–1	2006 World Cup qualifiers
2	30 March 2005	Stadion Gradski Park, Skopje, North Macedonia	Macedonia	2–1	2–1	2006 World Cup qualifiers

== Honours ==
Dinamo București

- Cupa României: 2002–03

Ajax

- Eredivisie: 2003–04
- KNVB Cup: 2006–07

Individual

- Ajax Talent of the Year (Marco van Basten Award): 2003–04
