= Svetozar Mijin =

Serbian footballer

Svetozar Mijin Светозар Мијин
Personal information
- Date of birth: July 25, 1978 (age 48)
- Place of birth: Novi Sad, SFR Yugoslavia
- Height: 1.92 m (6 ft 4 in)
- Position: Defensive midfielder

Youth career
- FK Kabel Novi Sad

Senior career*
Years	Team	Apps	(Gls)
1998–1999	Veternik	0	(0)
1999–2000	Kabel	47	(13)
2000	Ashdod	7	(0)
2000–2001	Maccabi Kiryat Gat	30	(4)
2002–2003	Rudar Pljevlja	5	(0)
2003–2004	Veternik	18	(3)
2003–2004	Glasinac Sokolac	0	(0)
2004–2007	CFR Cluj	43	(0)
2007–2009	Politehnica Iaşi	32	(1)
2009	Mahindra United	2	(2)
2010	ČSK Čelarevo		
2011–2012	Sloga Temerin		
2012	Nordvärmland	12	(2)
Total		196	(25)
- * Club domestic league appearances and goals

Svetozar Mijin (Serbian Cyrillic: Светозар Мијин; born 25 July 1978) is a Serbian retired footballer who played as a defensive midfielder. Mijin played 4 games in CFR Cluj's 2005 Intertoto Cup campaign in which the club reached the final.

== Honours ==
CFR Cluj

- Divizia B: 2003–04
- UEFA Intertoto Cup runner-up: 2005
