= Marius Nae =

Romanian footballer

Personal information
- Date of birth: 9 February 1981 (age 45)
- Place of birth: Bucharest, Romania
- Height: 1.73 m (5 ft 8 in)
- Position: Attacking midfielder

Senior career*
Years	Team	Apps	(Gls)
1999–2004	Naţional București	7	(0)
2000	→ Cimentul Fieni (loan)	14	(1)
2001	→ Callatis Mangalia (loan)	7	(4)
2004–2006	Sportul Studenţesc	46	(4)
2006–2008	Farul Constanţa	50	(7)
2009–2011	Sportul Studenţesc	36	(5)
2011–2012	Juventus București	4	(1)
2012–2015	Vulturul Pasărea		
Total		164	(22)
- * Club domestic league appearances and goals as of 1 May 2017 ‡ National team caps and goals as of N/A

Marius Nae (born 9 February 1981 in Bucharest) is a retired Romanian professional association football player.
