= Dănuț Șomcherechi =

Romanian footballer and manager

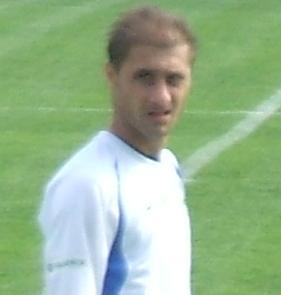

Personal information
- Full name: Dănuț Dragomir Șomcherechi
- Date of birth: 10 April 1973 (age 53)
- Place of birth: Baia Sprie, Romania
- Height: 1.83 m (6 ft 0 in)
- Position: Defender

Youth career
- Phoenix Baia Mare

Senior career*
Years	Team	Apps	(Gls)
1993–1995	Phoenix Baia Mare	?	(?)
1995–1999	Baia Mare	120	(14)
1999–2005	Argeș Pitești	128	(4)
2005	Oțelul Galați	9	(0)
2006–2007	Universitatea Cluj	35	(3)
2007–2009	Progresul București	40	(2)
2009–2010	Baia Mare	24	(2)
2010–2011	FCMU Baia Mare	?	(?)
Total		356+	(25+)

Managerial career
- 2017–2019: Kiss Baia Mare (youth)
- 2019–2020: Național Sebiș
- 2021–2022: Minerul Ocna Dej
- 2022–2023: Șimleu Silvaniei
- 2023: Minerul Ocna Dej
- * Club domestic league appearances and goals as of 21:03, 13 January 2024 (UTC)

Dănuț Dragomir Șomcherechi (born 10 April 1973) is a Romanian former football player and currently a manager. He made his Liga I debut on 11 March 2000 for Argeș Pitești, in a 0–1 defeat against Rapid București. Șomcherechi played most of his career for Baia Mare (144 matches) and for Argeș Pitești (128 matches), but also played for teams such as: Oțelul Galați, Universitatea Cluj or Progresul București. He retired in 2011 at 38 years old.
