= Adrian Popescu (footballer, born 1975) =

Romanian footballer

Personal information
- Full name: Adrian Popescu
- Date of birth: 25 June 1975 (age 51)
- Place of birth: Romania
- Position: Striker

Team information
- Current team: CSM Râmnicu-Vâlcea

Senior career*
Years	Team	Apps	(Gls)
–2006	Minerul Motru	?	(?)
2006–2008	Pandurii Târgu Jiu	37	(1)
2008–	CSM Râmnicu-Vâlcea	?	(?)
- * Club domestic league appearances and goals as of N/A ‡ National team caps and goals as of N/A

Adrian Popescu (born 25 June 1975) is a Romanian professional footballer who played for Pandurii Târgu Jiu in the Romanian Liga I. He made 31 league appearances for the club in the 2006–07 season, scoring two goals.
