= Robert Iacob =

Romanian footballer

Personal information
- Full name: Robert Mihai Iacob
- Date of birth: 24 June 1981 (age 45)
- Place of birth: Bucharest, Romania
- Height: 1.78 m (5 ft 10 in)
- Position: Central midfielder

Senior career*
| Years | Team | Apps | (Gls) |
| 1999–2000 | Rocar București | | |
| 2000–2001 | Diplomatic Focşani | 31 | (6) |
| 2001 | FCM Bacău | 1 | (0) |
| 2001–2003 | FC Oneşti | 18 | (1) |
| 2003–2005 | Farul Constanţa | 24 | (4) |
| 2005–2006 | Unirea Urziceni | 1 | (0) |
| 2006–2007 | Bihor Oradea | | |
| 2007–2008 | Liberty Salonta | 11 | (0) |
| 2008–2009 | UTA Arad | 16 | (0) |
| 2009–2010 | Universitatea Cluj | | |
| 2011 | Metalul Frăsinet | 2 | (2) |
| 2012 | Otopeni | 9 | (2) |
| Total | | 113+ | (15+) |
- * Club domestic league appearances and goals as of 29 December 2015

Robert Mihai Iacob (born 24 June 1981 in Bucharest) is a former Romanian football player.
