= Gabriel Apetri =

Romanian professional footballer

Personal information
- Date of birth: 23 December 1981 (age 44)
- Place of birth: Petroșani, Romania
- Height: 1.80 m (5 ft 11 in)
- Position: Forward

Team information
- Current team: Jiul Petroşani

Senior career*
Years	Team	Apps	(Gls)
1999	Inter Petrila	?	(?)
2000–2005	Jiul Petroşani	73	(30)
2005	FCU Craiova	0	(0)
2006	Oțelul Galați	3	(0)
2006–2010	Jiul Petroşani	44	(9)
2010	Mureșul Deva	2	(0)
2011–2012	Jiul Petroşani	?	(?)
2012	Știința Miroslava	?	(?)
2012–2014	Jiul Petroşani	?	(?)
2015–2016	CS Vulcan	?	(?)
2018–	Jiul Petroşani	?	(?)
- * Club domestic league appearances and goals as of 11 March 2018

Gabriel Apetri (born 23 December 1981) is a Romanian professional footballer who plays as a striker for Jiul Petroşani. He played in Liga I for Oțelul Galați and Jiul Petroşani, club where he played the most of his career. Apetri retired in 2016.

In 2018 Apetri returned to his football career and joined Jiul Petroşani.
