= Radu Ciobanu =

Romanian former footballer

Personal information
- Full name: Radu Eduard Ciobanu
- Date of birth: 1 September 1975 (age 51)
- Place of birth: Bacău, Romania
- Height: 1.88 m (6 ft 2 in)
- Position: Centre back

Youth career
- Unirea Focșani
- Selena Bacău

Senior career*
Years	Team	Apps	(Gls)
1992–2004	Aerostar Bacău		
1994–2004	FCM Bacău	172	(8)
2005–2008	Politehnica Iași	54	(2)
2008–2009	Știința Bacău	27	(1)
2009–2010	Pambac Bacău		
Total		253	(11)

Managerial career
- 2014–: FC Bacău (youth)
- 2015: SC Bacău (youth)
- * Club domestic league appearances and goals as of 26 November 2019

Radu Eduard Ciobanu (born 1 September 1975) is a Romanian former footballer who played as a centre back.

Playing in his first years for Aerostar Bacău, Ciobanu was transferred to FCM Bacău, where he played for ten years in the first two football leagues of Romania. His contract expired in 2004, and spent a year without a team. Ciobanu returned in Romanian football at the age of 30, signing a contract with Politehnica Iaşi.
