= Cristian Crăciun =

Romanian footballer (born 1972)

Personal information
- Date of birth: 16 November 1972 (age 53)
- Place of birth: Galaţi, Romania
- Height: 1.69 m (5 ft 6 1/2 in)
- Position: Right midfielder

Youth career
- 1986–1987: DVA Portul Galați
- 1988–1991: Știința Navrom Galați

Senior career*
Years	Team	Apps	(Gls)
1991–1994	Metalul Galați		
1993–1994	→Rulmentul Bârlad (loan)		
1995	ȘN Galați		
1995–1996	Metalul Toflea		
1997–2000	Petrolul Ploieşti	91	(12)
2000–2003	Astra Ploieşti	81	(12)
2003–2004	Petrolul Ploieşti	26	(1)
2004–2007	Oțelul Galați	62	(4)
- * Club domestic league appearances and goals as of 11 March 2010

Cristian Crăciun (born 16 November 1972) is a retired Romanian football player.
