= Nicolae Rainea Stadium =

Football stadium in Galați, Romania

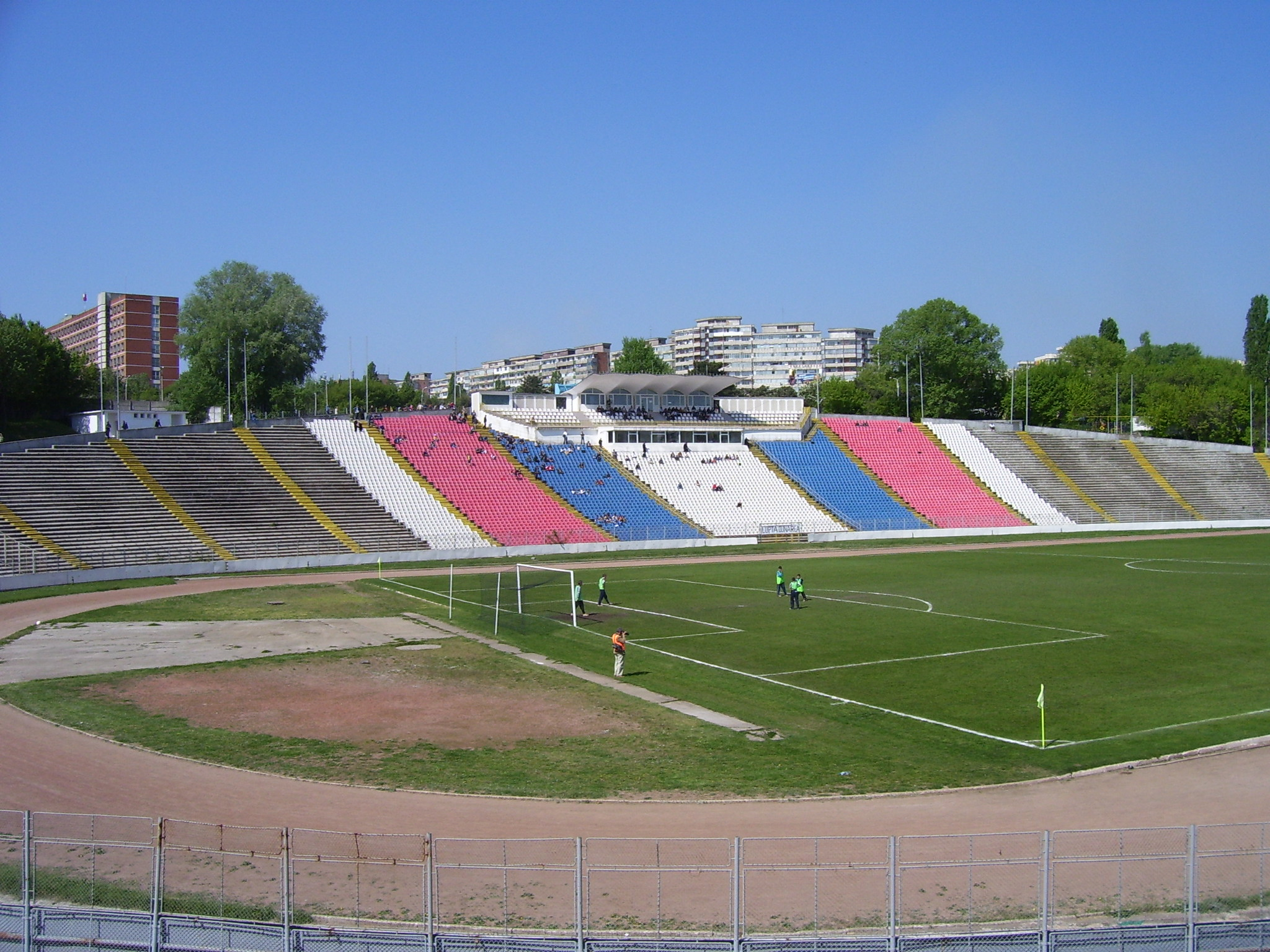
- Interactive map of Nicolae Rainea Stadium
- Location: Galați, Romania
- Coordinates: 45°25′15″N 28°01′25″E
- Owner: Galați City Hall
- Capacity: 23,000
- Surface: Grass

Construction
- Renovated: 2004

Tenants
- Dunărea Galaţi (1970–2014); Metalosport Galați (2015–2018); Oțelul Galați (2004–2005, 2016); CSU Galați (2018–2019)

The Nicolae Rainea Stadium, formerly known as Dunărea Stadium, is a multi-purpose stadium, frequently used for football. It is located in Galați and was the home ground of CSU Galați and Dunărea Galaţi, among others. The stadium holds 23,000 people. Named after Nicolae Rainea, it is the 7th stadium in the country by capacity (List of football stadiums in Romania).

== Gallery ==
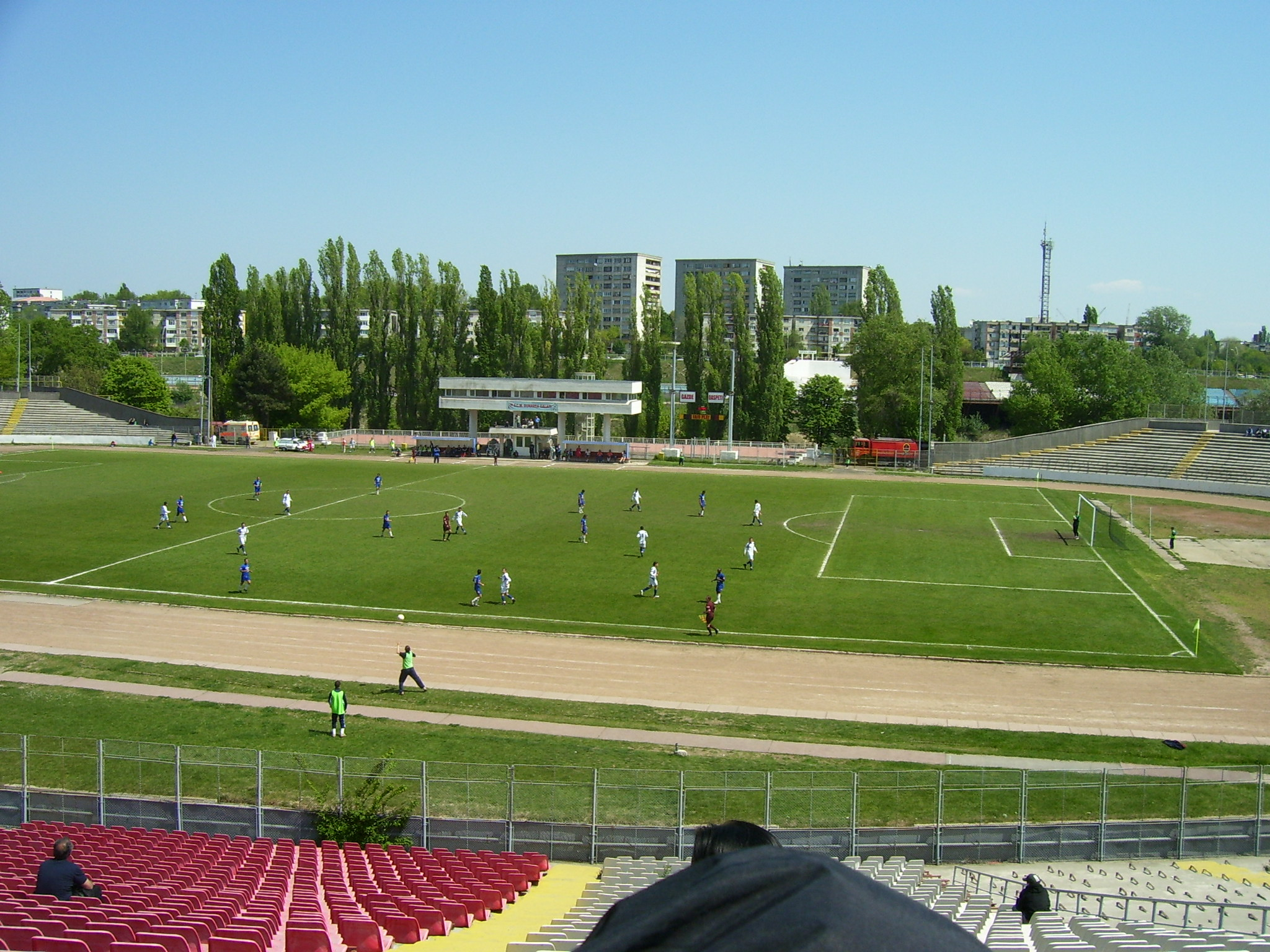
Nicolae Rainea Stadium
View from the Main Stand
