= Rareș Soporan =

Romanian footballer

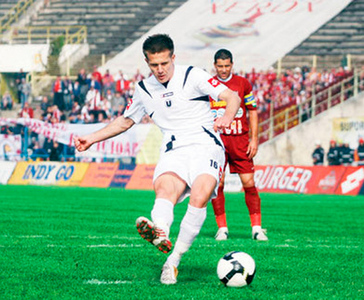

Personal information
- Full name: Rareș Ciprian Soporan
- Date of birth: 29 June 1983 (age 43)
- Place of birth: Cluj-Napoca, Romania
- Height: 1.86 m (6 ft 1 in)
- Positions: Defender; midfielder

Youth career
- CUG Cluj
- 1993–2002: Universitatea Cluj

Senior career*
Years	Team	Apps	(Gls)
2002–2006	Universitatea Cluj	45	(10)
2002	→ Minerul Iara (loan)	?	(?)
2006–2007	Politehnica Timișoara	9	(0)
2007	→ Ceahlăul Piatra Neamţ (loan)	1	(0)
2007	→ FCM Reșița (loan)	9	(0)
2008–2010	Universitatea Cluj	26	(2)
2010	Unirea Alba Iulia	14	(1)
2010–2012	Delta Tulcea	43	(0)
2012–2014	Milsami Orhei	34	(1)
Total		181	(14)
- * Club domestic league appearances and goals as of 25 February 2018

Rareș Ciprian Soporan (born 29 June 1983) is a Romanian former professional football player. He played as a central defender but could also take up the role of a defensive midfielder. Soporan retired in 2014 and after that he moved to Jersey where he cured works as a Business Development Executive in the insurance industry.

He started football at CUG Cluj before moving to Universitatea Cluj in 1993. The first two seasons at "U"'s first team were rather uneventful but then Soporan made 28 appearances and scored 9 goals in just one season for the Divizia B team. Winter 2006 saw him transferred to Politehnica Timişoara where he was coached by Gheorghe Hagi.

After a year and half, in which he did not rise up to the club's expectations, Rares Soporan was loaned to Ceahlăul Piatra Neamţ.
