= Silviu Izvoranu =

Romanian footballer

Personal information
- Date of birth: 3 December 1982 (age 43)
- Place of birth: Galați, Romania
- Height: 1.85 m (6 ft 1 in)
- Position: Defensive midfielder

Senior career*
Years	Team	Apps	(Gls)
2003	Dunărea Galați		
2003–2006	Oțelul Galați	43	(2)
2006–2007	Politehnica Timișoara	27	(2)
2007–2010	Dinamo București	34	(0)
2009	→ Astra Ploiești (loan)	2	(0)
2009–2010	→ Internațional Curtea de Argeș (loan)	10	(0)
2010–2011	Universitatea Cluj	10	(0)
2011–2013	Volyn Lutsk	40	(1)
2013–2014	Universitatea Craiova	19	(3)
2014	CSM Râmnicu Vâlcea	1	(0)
2014–2016	Universitatea Craiova	18	(0)
Total		204	(8)

International career
2005	Romania U21	1	(0)
- * Club domestic league appearances and goals as of 31 May 2016

Silviu Izvoranu (born 3 December 1982) is a Romanian former footballer who played mainly as a defensive midfielder.

== Club career ==
Izvoranu was born on 3 December 1982 in Galați, Romania. He began playing football at Dunărea Galați during the 2003–04 Divizia C season. Midway through the season, he moved to neighboring club Oțelul, making his Divizia A debut on 12 May 2004, when coach Sorin Cârțu sent him in the 58th minute to replace Adrian Toma in a 1–1 draw against FC Oradea. The team reached the 2004 Cupa României final, but he did not play in the 2–0 loss to Dinamo București. Subsequently, Izvoranu played in both legs of the 1–0 aggregate loss to Partizan Belgrade in the second qualifying round of the 2004–05 UEFA Cup. On 16 April 2005, he scored his first Divizia A goal in a 1–0 win over Politehnica Timișoara.

In the middle of the 2005–06 season, Izvoranu joined Politehnica Timișoara. The team reached the 2007 Cupa României final, but coach Valentin Velcea did not use him in the 2–0 loss to Rapid București. In July 2007, Izvoranu was transferred from Politehnica to Dinamo București for a €500,000 fee. Dinamo's coach Mircea Rednic said about the transfer: "I wanted Izvoranu; he’s versatile, has a good physique, and we need players like that—especially for set pieces". Dinamo aimed to reach the 2007–08 Champions League group stage, with Izvoranu playing in the first leg of the third qualifying round against Lazio Roma, which was eventually lost 4–2 on aggregate. Afterwards, he played in a 2–1 loss to IF Elfsborg in the first round of the 2007–08 UEFA Cup. In July 2009, Astra Ploiești announced that they had reached an agreement with Dinamo for the loan of Izvoranu. However, about one month later, after making two league appearances for Astra, he joined Internațional Curtea de Argeș. In July 2010, he moved to Universitatea Cluj.

In February 2011, Volyn Lutsk transferred Izvoranu after paying Universitatea Cluj a fee estimated by the Romanian press to be around €250,000. His debut in the Ukrainian Premier League took place on 5 March under coach Vitaliy Kvartsyanyi in a 3–0 away loss to Zorya Luhansk. He scored his first goal in the competition on 28 July 2012 in a 2–0 away victory against Chornomorets Odesa. That was his only goal scored in his 40 appearances in the Ukrainian league. During his years spent at Volyn, he was teammates with fellow Romanians Cornel Buta, Sorin Paraschiv, Eric Bicfalvi and Adrian Neaga.

In September 2013, Izvoranu returned to Romania by joining second-tier club Universitatea Craiova. He helped them gain promotion to the first league at the end of the 2013–14 season by scoring a goal in a 1–1 draw against Metalul Reșița that mathematically secured it. However, he remained to play in the second league by signing with CSM Râmnicu Vâlcea. After making a single league appearance for them, Izvoranu returned to Universitatea Craiova in September 2014. During this stint, which lasted until April 2016, he made his last appearances in the Romanian top-league, totaling 149 matches with four goals in the competition.

== International career ==
Izvoranu played one match for Romania's under-21 team on 3 June 2005 in a 2–0 loss to the Netherlands in the 2006 European Under-21 Championship qualifiers.

== Honours ==
Oțelul Galați

- Cupa României runner-up: 2003–04

Politehnica Timișoara

- Cupa României runner-up: 2006–07

Universitatea Craiova

- Liga II: 2013–14
