= Marian Alexandru =

Romanian former football player

Personal information
- Date of birth: 20 September 1977 (age 49)
- Place of birth: Bucharest, Romania
- Height: 1.79 m (5 ft 10 1/2 in)
- Position: Defender

Senior career*
Years	Team	Apps	(Gls)
1996–1997	Steaua București	1	(0)
1997–1998	Chindia Târgovişte	22	(3)
1998–1999	Olimpia Satu Mare	30	(4)
1999–2000	Gloria Bistrița	32	(7)
2001	Alania Vladikavkaz	4	(0)
2001–2003	Olimpia Satu Mare	13	(4)
2003–2004	Gloria Bistrița	0	(0)
2005	Oțelul Galați	9	(1)
2006	Petrolul Ploiești	8	(0)
2006	FC Vaslui	5	(0)
2007	Ceahlăul Piatra Neamț	5	(0)
2007–2008	Concordia Chiajna	6	(1)
2008–2009	Voința Domnești	?	(?)
Total		135	(20)
- * Club domestic league appearances and goals

Marian Alexandru (born 20 September 1977) is a Romanian former football player.
