= Sergiu Brujan =

Romanian former football player

Personal information
- Date of birth: 14 March 1976 (age 50)
- Place of birth: Prejmer, Romania
- Height: 1.80 m (5 ft 11 in)
- Positions: Right back; right midfielder

Youth career
- Braşov

Senior career*
Years	Team	Apps	(Gls)
1993–1994	Braşov	2	(0)
1994–1996	ICIM Braşov	21	(0)
1996–1999	Precizia Săcele	78	(3)
1999–2001	Foresta Fălticeni	70	(8)
2002–2004	Ceahlăul Piatra Neamţ	40	(5)
2003	Rapid București	7	(0)
2004	Ceahlăul Piatra Neamţ	11	(1)
2004–2005	Braşov	8	(0)
2006–2008	Oțelul Galați	47	(1)
2008	FC Ploiești	6	(0)
2009–2015	Unirea Tărlungeni	43+	(3+)
2015	FC Zagon	?	(?)
2016	Sepsi OSK	?	(?)
2016–2017	ASATSC Reci	?	(?)
Total		333+	(21+)
- * Club domestic league appearances and goals as of 25 February 2018

Sergiu Brujan (born 14 March 1976) is a Romanian former football player who played as a right back or right midfielder.
