= Cosmin Mărginean =

Romanian footballer (born 1978)

Personal information
- Full name: Cosmin Nicolae Mărginean
- Date of birth: 21 November 1978 (age 47)
- Place of birth: Câmpia Turzii, Romania
- Height: 1.79 m (5 ft 10 1/2 in)
- Position: Midfielder

Senior career*
Years	Team	Apps	(Gls)
2001–2007	Oțelul Galați	133	(2)
2007–2008	Unirea Urziceni	1	(0)
2008	Okzhetpes	?	(?)
2009–2010	Delta Tulcea	?	(2)
2013–2014	Delta Tulcea	?	(?)
Total		134+	(4+)

Managerial career
- 2013–2014: Delta Tulcea
Medal record
Oţelul Galaţi
Runner-up	Cupa României	2004
- * Club domestic league appearances and goals as of 28 February 2018

Cosmin Nicolae Mărginean (born 21 November 1978) is a Romanian former football player. In his career Mărginean played for Oțelul Galați, Unirea Urziceni, Delta Tulcea and Kazakh club Okzhetpes.
