= Marian Zeciu =

Association football player (born 1977)

Personal information
- Full name: Tudor Marian Zeciu
- Date of birth: 25 February 1977 (age 49)
- Place of birth: Bucharest, Romania
- Height: 1.80 m (5 ft 11 in)
- Positions: Defender; defensive midfielder

Team information
- Current team: Daco-Getica București (head coach)

Senior career*
Years	Team	Apps	(Gls)
1998–2001	Juventus București	67	(2)
2001–2002	Electromagnetica București	27	(0)
2003–2004	Pyunik Yerevan	24	(11)
2004–2006	Oțelul Galați	29	(0)
2006	Ceahlăul Piatra Neamţ	2	(0)
2007	Juventus București	?	(?)
2007–2012	CS Snagov	71	(1)
Total		220	(14)

International career
2003–2004	Armenia	7	(0)

Managerial career
- 2014–2017: Juventus București (assistant)
- 2020–2024: Daco-Getica București (youth coach)
- 2024–: Daco-Getica București
- * Club domestic league appearances and goals

Marian Zeciu (born 25 February 1977) is a football manager and former professional player who is head coach at Daco-Getica București. He played as a defender. Born in Romania, he was a member of Armenia national team, making seven appearances.

== Career statistics ==
Armenia national team
Year	Apps	Goals
2003	3	0
2004	4	0
Total	7	0

== Honours ==
Pyunik Yerevan

- Armenian Premier League: 2003, 2004
- Armenian Cup: 2004
