= Dan Balauru =

Romanian footballer

Personal information
- Full name: Nicolae Daniel Balauru
- Date of birth: 6 December 1980 (age 45)
- Place of birth: Alexandria, Romania
- Height: 1.81 m (5 ft 11 in)
- Position: Midfielder

Youth career
- Rulmentul Alexandria

Senior career*
Years	Team	Apps	(Gls)
1997–2000	Rulmentul Alexandria	17	(0)
2000	Rocar București	2	(0)
2000–2001	Fulgerul Bragadiru	19	(3)
2001–2002	AEK București	15	(0)
2002–2004	Poli AEK Timişoara	37	(2)
2004–2005	Apulum Alba Iulia	10	(2)
2005–2006	Oțelul Galați	18	(1)
2006	FCM Bacău	9	(0)
2006–2007	Unirea Urziceni	13	(0)
2007–2008	Dacia Mioveni	15	(2)
2008–2009	Otopeni	2	(0)
2009–2012	FC Snagov	20	(2)
2010–2011	→ Râmnicu Vâlcea (loan)	21	(7)
2011	→ Viitorul Domnești (loan)		
2012–2013	Inter Clinceni		
2013	Metaloglobus București		
2014–2016	Spicpo Poroschia		
2016	Dunărea Giurgiu		
2016–2017	Voința Crevedia		
Total		198+	(19+)
- * Club domestic league appearances and goals as of 12:08, 15 June 2021 (UTC)

Nicolae Daniel Balauru (born 6 December 1980) is a Romanian former footballer who played as a midfielder for teams such as Rulmentul Alexandria, Poli AEK Timişoara, Oțelul Galați or CSM Râmnicu Vâlcea, among others.

His brother, Dragoș Balauru is also a footballer.
