= ACS Olimpic Snagov =

Association football club in Romania

Olimpic Snagov
- Full name: Asociația Club Sportiv; Olimpic Snagov
- Nickname: Snagovenii
- Founded: 1997; 29 years ago as CS Snagov; 2013; 13 years ago as Voința Snagov; 2021; 5 years ago as Olimpic Snagov
- Ground: Voința
- Capacity: 1,500
- Owner: Snagov Commune
- Chairman: Tiberiu Simulescu
- Manager: Laurențiu Stan
- League: Liga IV
- 2025–26: Liga IV, Ilfov County, 3rd of 9
Home colours	Away colours

Asociația Club Sportiv Olimpic Snagov commonly known as Olimpic Snagov is a professional Romanian football club based in Snagov, Ilfov County.

Founded in 1997 originally as CS Snagov, the club played five seasons in Divizia B, the second tier of the Romanian football league system, before being dissolved in 2012. Re-founded in 2013 as Voința Snagov, the club was dissolved once again in 2016 but was re-founded in 2021 as Olimpic Snagov.

== History ==
The club was founded in 1997 as CS Snagov and played in Divizia D – Ilfov County the fourth tier of Romanian football. In 2002, the club acquiring a place in the third division. In 2003, the football department became independent under the name FC Snagov.

In its first two seasons, the club narrowly secured its place in Divizia C, finishing 11th in the 2002–03 season and 12th in the 2003–04.

In the 2004–05 season, FC Snagov managed to move away from the lower places in the table and finished 5th in Series III. The following season, under head coach Laurențiu Tudor, FC Snagov clearly won Series III of Divizia C, finishing eight points ahead of 2nd-placed Dunărea Călărași, and earned its first promotion to the second division.

However, their spell in Liga II was short-lived, as FC Snagov finished the 2006–07 season in 16th place in Series I, thirteen points behind safety, and was relegated.

Under the guidance of Mihai Stoica, the team quickly returned to Liga II, finishing 1st in Series II of the 2007–08 Liga III season. This time, FC Snagov managed to stay in the second division, finishing the 2008–09 season in 12th place in Series I.

In the summer of 2009, Laurențiu Reghecampf officially ended his playing career and convinced Lutz Stache, the managing director and owner of a building materials company from Cottbus, to invest in FC Snagov. Although Stache paid off the club's old debts to the players, he did not become the main shareholder of FC Snagov as initially announced.

After an away defeat to Dunărea Galați, Reghecampf's wife, Anamaria Prodan, became the new club president on 21 October 2009, and Cristian Țermure succeeded Mihai Stoica as head coach. In reality, Reghecampf took charge of the team, but since he lacked a valid UEFA Pro license, he was officially listed as a sports director and even a masseur on match report sheets. The team finished the 2009–10 season in 4th place, the club's best-ever result. Reghecampf and his wife left the club on 14 May 2010, five games before the end of the season.

That summer, Laurențiu Tudor was appointed technical director, and George Dumitru replaced Cristian Țermure as head coach. In early September 2010, Cătălin Rufă, one of the club's shareholders, became the new owner of CSM Râmnicu Vâlcea. He was followed by technical director Tudor, while Reghecampf returned to FC Snagov on 30 November 2010, with former head coach George Dumitru becoming his assistant.

Former logo.

However, Reghecampf left FC Snagov in January 2011 to take up the role of sporting director at FC U Craiova, so George Dumitru was once again promoted to head coach. On 3 March 2011, Reghecampf returned once more but stayed only until 4 April 2011, when he moved to Craiova again, this time as head coach. The club finished the 2010–11 season in the lower half of the table, placing 11th in Series I under coach George Dumitru.

In June 2011, Reghecampf returned as head coach of the team. However, on 18 December 2011, he resigned to replace Laurențiu Diniță as coach of Concordia Chiajna in Liga I.

After Apostol Mușat, the mayor of Snagov, was arrested on 22 December 2011 on corruption charges, and seven players followed Reghecampf to Chiajna, the club was on the verge of withdrawing from the 2011–12 Liga II season. However, in early January 2012, the club's investors decided to continue, and Laurențiu Tudor was hired as the new coach. Despite this, the club eventually withdrew and stopped playing shortly afterward.

The team was later re-enrolled in Liga IV – Ilfov County for the 2012–13 season without the right to promotion, finishing 4th. Renamed Voința Snagov, the team led by George Dumitru won Liga IV – Ilfov County at the end of the 2013–14 season and won the promotion play-off against Unirea Fierbinți, the Ialomița County winners, with a 4–0 victory at Ion Comșa Stadium in Călărași. In Liga III, Voința finished 12th in Series II in the 2014–15 season and 13th in 2015–16.

In the summer of 2016, Metalul Reșița, a team owned by Cătălin Rufă, the former shareholder of FC Snagov, was relocated from Reșița to Snagov, taking all of Voința Snagov's players and staff and being renamed Sportul Snagov. As a result, Voința Snagov was dissolved.

== Honours ==
Liga III

- Winners (2): 2005–06, 2007–08

Liga IV – Ilfov County

- Winners (1): 2013–14

== Former players ==
The footballers enlisted below have had international cap(s) for their respective countries at junior and/or senior level and/or more than 50 caps for Voința Snagov.

- (Armenia) Marian Zeciu
- (Romania) Roberto Iancu
- (Romania) Viorel Dinu
- (Romania) Adrian Popa
- (Romania) Lucian Filip
- (Romania) Sergiu Hanca
- (Romania) Alexandru Radu
- (Romania) Gigel Ene
- (Romania) Anton Petrea
- (Romania) Irinel Voicu

== Former managers ==
- (Romania) Ion Vlădoiu
- (Romania) Mihai Stoica
- (Romania) Cristian Țermure
- (Romania) Laurențiu Reghecampf
- (Romania) George Dumitru
- (Romania) Laurențiu Tudor
- (Romania) Marin Dună
