= Ionuț Bâlbă =

Romanian footballer

Personal information
- Full name: Ionuț Mihai Bâlbă
- Date of birth: 1 November 1981 (age 45)
- Place of birth: Pașcani, Romania
- Height: 1.81 m (5 ft 11 1/2 in)
- Position: Striker

Youth career
- CFR Pașcani

Senior career*
| Years | Team | Apps | (Gls) |
| 2001–2002 | CFR Pașcani | | |
| 2002–2010 | Politehnica Iași | 172 | (46) |
| 2010 | Botoșani | 5 | (1) |
| 2011 | Gloria Bistrița | 5 | (2) |
| 2011 | CSMS Iași | 3 | (1) |
| 2012 | Viitorul Belcești | | |
| 2012 | Jiul Petroșani | | |
| 2013 | Viitorul Târgu Frumos | | |
| 2018–2020 | Bradu Borca | | |
| Total | | 185 | (50) |
- * Club domestic league appearances and goals as of 22 December 2016

Ionuț Mihai Bâlbă (born 1 November 1981) is a Romanian retired football player who played as a striker. He played mainly for Politehnica Iași and made 142 appearances, scoring 35 goals in the Romanian top-league, Liga I.

== Career ==
Bâlbă was born on 1 November 1981 in Pașcani, Romania and began playing junior-level football at local club CFR. He began playing for the club's senior team during the 2001–02 Divizia C season. In 2002, he was transferred for a $10,000 fee by Divizia B club Politehnica Iași. He helped them gain promotion to the first league at the end of the 2003–04 season by netting 12 goals. Subsequently, Bâlbă made his Divizia A debut under coach Vasile Simionaș on 30 July 2004 in a 2–1 loss to Rapid București, scoring his side's goal. In the 2005–06 season, he netted a career-best nine goals in the first league, including a brace in a 4–0 win over FCM Bacău. In the following two seasons, Bâlbă netted eight goals in each season, including two doubles in victories against Jiul Petroșani and UTA Arad. Bâlbă was heavily criticized when he had the rims of his car painted in gold, as Politehnica had financial problems at that time. In order to show solidarity and defend him, coach Ionuț Popa also had the emblems of his car painted in gold. During his years at Politehnica, Bâlbă received offers from top Romanian clubs such as Rapid, CFR Cluj, FC Vaslui, Universitatea Craiova and Unirea Urziceni. However, none of these materialized, either because Politehnica demanded a high transfer fee or because he did not wish to leave. Eventually, following Politehnica's relegation at the end of the 2009–10 season, he joined the second-tier club Botoșani. Bâlbă returned to first league football by signing with Gloria Bistrița where he made his last Liga I appearance and also scored a goal in a 3–1 loss to Steaua București, totaling 142 matches with 35 goals in the competition. Afterwards, he spent the first half of the 2011–12 Liga II season at CSMS Iași, before moving to Liga IV club Viitorul Belcești, but CSMS managed to gain promotion to the first league without him. Bâlbă spent the last years of his career playing for teams in the Romanian lower leagues such as Jiul Petroșani, Viitorul Târgu Frumos and Bradu Borca.

== Controversy ==
Bâlbă was caught by police on several occasions driving under the influence, driving with a suspended license, and crashing his car into a pole. Eventually, he received a nine-month suspended sentence.

== Honours ==
Politehnica Iași

- Divizia B: 2003–04, 2011–12
