= Roberto Iancu =

Romanian footballer

Personal information
- Date of birth: 26 March 1982 (age 44)
- Place of birth: Bucharest, Romania
- Height: 1.70 m (5 ft 7 in)
- Position: Central midfielder

Youth career
- Progresul București

Senior career*
Years	Team	Apps	(Gls)
2002–2008	Progresul București	69	(4)
2008	Prefabricate Modelu	4	(1)
2009	Progresul București	4	(0)
2009–2011	FC Snagov	53	(2)
2012	Concordia Chiajna	8	(0)
2012	Universitatea Cluj	7	(0)
Total		145	(7)
- * Club domestic league appearances and goals

Roberto Iancu (born 26 March 1982) is a Romanian former professional footballer who played as a midfielder. In 1998, Iancu and Nicolae Mitea were taken by coach Ionuț Chirilă on a one-week trial at FC Barcelona, but despite leaving a good impression, they did not sign a contract because of some problems with their sports agent.
