= Ionuț Bădescu =

Romanian footballer

Ionuţ Bădescu
Personal information
- Full name: Ionuţ Bădescu
- Date of birth: 25 January 1978 (age 48)
- Place of birth: Câmpulung-Muscel, Romania
- Height: 1.74 m (5 ft 8 1/2 in)
- Position: Midfielder

Youth career
- 1985–1991: ARO Câmpulung
- 1991–1992: Argeș Pitești
- 1992–1995: ARO Câmpulung

Senior career*
Years	Team	Apps	(Gls)
1995–1998	ARO Câmpulung	83	(10)
1998–2004	Farul Constanţa	129	(12)
2004–2005	Naftex Burgas	30	(0)
2005–2008	Oțelul Galați	44	(4)
2008–2013	Ceahlăul Piatra Neamţ	157	(0)
2013–2014	CSMS Iași	10	(0)
- * Club domestic league appearances and goals

Ionuț Bădescu (born 25 January 1978) is a Romanian former footballer who played as a midfielder.
