= Ștefan Nanu =

Romanian footballer and manager

Ştefan Nanu
Personal information
- Full name: Ștefan Dumitru Nanu
- Date of birth: 8 September 1968 (age 58)
- Place of birth: Filiași, Romania
- Height: 1.68 m (5 ft 6 in)
- Position: Left-back

Senior career*
Years	Team	Apps	(Gls)
1991–1995	Electroputere Craiova	93	(0)
1995–1997	Farul Constanța	52	(0)
1997–1999	Rapid București	60	(1)
1999–2003	Vitesse Arnhem	61	(1)
2003	Steaua București	5	(0)
2003–2005	Oțelul Galați	33	(0)
2005–2008	Poiana Câmpina	48	(0)
Total		352	(2)

International career
1999–2000	Romania	7	(0)

Managerial career
- 2005–2007: FCM Câmpina
- 2007: Petrolul Ploiești
- 2008: Inter Gaz București
- 2010–2013: Minerul Motru
- 2014: Farul Constanța
- 2014–2015: FC Ter Apel (youth)
- 2015–2017: FC Emmen (youth)
- 2017–2018: Râmnicu Vâlcea U17
- 2018: Poli Timișoara
- 2019–2023: CSM Deva
- * Club domestic league appearances and goals

Ștefan Dumitru Nanu (born 8 September 1968 in Filiași) is a Romanian football manager and former player. He played as a left-back.
