= Municipal Stadium (Bacău) =

Stadium in Romania

Coordinates: 46°33′26″N 26°54′48″E

Bacău Municipal Stadium
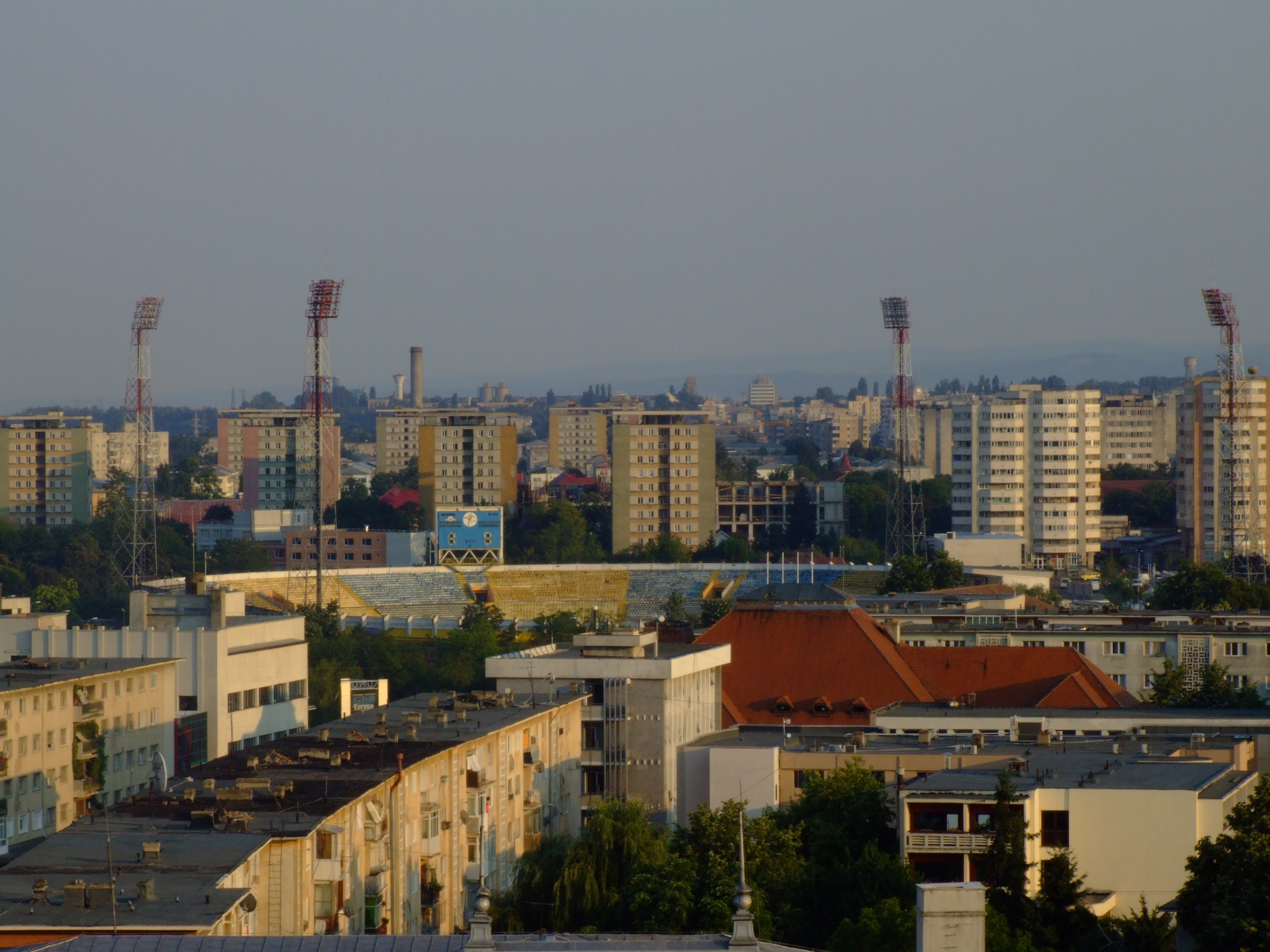
- The venue in 2007
- Interactive map of Bacău Municipal Stadium
- Full name: Stadionul Municipal
- Former names: Dumitru Sechelariu Stadium (2001–2004)
- Location: Bacău, Romania
- Owner: Bacău Municipality
- Capacity: 17,500
- Surface: Grass

Construction
- Opened: 1966
- Renovated: 2003, 2010
- Closed: 2014–present

Tenants
- FCM Bacău (1966–2012); SC Bacău (2010–2013)

The Bacău Municipal Stadium is a multi-use stadium in Bacău. It holds 17,500 people and it is the 19th stadium in the country.

== History ==
Municipal Stadium from Bacău was opened in 1966 and was the home ground of FCM Bacău and SC Bacău.

The stadium was renovated several times over the years. In 2014 a modernization project was approved for the stadium. The capacity would be reduced to 15,000, but the stadium would benefit from having modern facilities. However, shortly after the work began, the project was stopped and the stadium was closed, becoming unusable.

In the spring of 2017 the modernization project was resumed. The Municipality of Bacău allocated funds for the continuation of the works.
