= Daniel Munteanu =

Romanian footballer and manager

Personal information
- Full name: Daniel George Munteanu
- Date of birth: 6 June 1978 (age 48)
- Place of birth: Onești, Romania
- Height: 1.88 m (6 ft 2 in)
- Position: Centre-back

Youth career
- FC Onești

Senior career*
Years	Team	Apps	(Gls)
1999–2000	FC Onești	9	(0)
2000–2002	Foresta Suceava	27	(1)
2002–2003	Farul Constanța	7	(0)
2003–2005	Oțelul Galați	60	(6)
2006	Khazar Lenkoran	11	(2)
2007–2008	Unirea Urziceni	31	(2)
2008–2009	FC Vaslui	11	(0)
2009–2010	Unirea Urziceni	1	(0)
2010–2011	Universitatea Cluj	18	(0)
2011–2012	Delta Tulcea	17	(1)
Total		192	(11)

Managerial career
- 2014–2015: Dinamo Onești
- 2015–2016: Știința Miroslava
- 2017: Pașcani
- 2017–2019: FC Onești (youth)
- 2019–2020: Aerostar Bacău
- 2020–2021: Aerostar Bacău
Medal record
Oțelul Galați
Runner-up	Romanian Cup	2004
Unirea Urziceni
Runner-up	Romanian Cup	2008
- * Club domestic league appearances and goals as of 24 September 2020

Daniel George Munteanu (born 6 June 1978) is a Romanian former football player and currently a manager.

== Honours ==
=== Player ===
FC Vaslui

- UEFA Intertoto Cup: 2008

=== Coach ===
Aerostar Bacău

- Liga III: 2019–20
