= Gheorghe Rohat =

Romanian footballer

Personal information
- Date of birth: 23 January 1975 (age 51)
- Place of birth: Ploieşti, Romania
- Height: 1.78 m (5 ft 10 in)
- Position: Defender

Senior career*
| Years | Team | Apps | (Gls) |
| 1996–1997 | Victoria '96 Floreşti | 11 | (2) |
| 1996–1997 | AS Ploieşti | 14 | (0) |
| 1997–2000 | Astra Ploieşti | 82 | (8) |
| 2000–2001 | Petrolul Ploieşti | 36 | (1) |
| 2002 | Bihor Oradea | 7 | (0) |
| 2002–2003 | Zimbru Chișinău | 20 | (2) |
| 2003–2005 | Oţelul Galaţi | 57 | (2) |
| 2005–2006 | Argeş Pitești | 23 | (1) |
| 2006–2008 | Unirea Urziceni | 26 | (2) |
| 2008–2011 | Astra Ploieşti | 62 | (3) |
| Total | | 338 | (21) |
Medal record
Oţelul Galaţi
| Runner-up | Cupa României | 2004 |
- * Club domestic league appearances and goals as of 14:40, 6 March 2010

Gheorghe Rohat (born 23 January 1975, Ploieşti) is a former Romanian footballer.

== Titles ==
| Season | Club | Title |
|---|---|---|
| 1997–98 | Astra Ploieşti | Liga II |
| 2003 | Zimbru Chişinău | Moldovan Cup |
| 2007–08 | Astra Ploieşti | Liga III |
