= Bogdan Aldea =

Romanian footballer

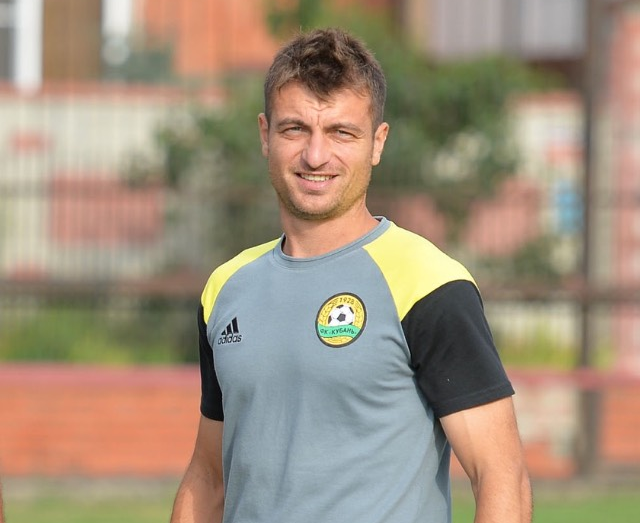

Personal information
- Full name: Bogdan Aurelian Aldea
- Date of birth: 26 April 1981 (age 45)
- Place of birth: Târgoviște, Romania
- Height: 1.81 m (5 ft 11 1/2 in)
- Position: Forward

Team information
- Current team: Bihor Oradea (fitness coach)

Youth career
- 1995–1999: Dinamo București

Senior career*
Years	Team	Apps	(Gls)
1999–2001	Dinamo București	12	(1)
2000–2001	→ Poiana Câmpina (loan)	27	(4)
2001	→ Poiana Câmpina (loan)	16	(3)
2002–2003	Petrolul Ploiești	40	(9)
2003–2006	Oțelul Galați	39	(6)
2006–2008	Unirea Urziceni	22	(4)
2009	Drobeta-Turnu Severin	10	(3)
2009–2010	Anagennisi Giannitsa	19	(6)
2010	ALRO Slatina	6	(3)
2011	CSM Slatina	7	(2)
2011	CSMS Iași	5	(1)
2012	ACS Buftea	7	(1)
2013–2014	ACS Berceni	14	(0)
Total		224	(43)

Managerial career
- 2012–2013: Dinamo București (fitness coach)
- 2013–2014: Berceni (player/fitness coach)
- 2014–2015: Fortuna Poiana Câmpina (fitness coach)
- 2015: Al-Shoulla (fitness coach)
- 2015–2016: Concordia Chiajna (fitness coach)
- 2016: Dinamo București (fitness coach)
- 2016–2017: Kuban Krasnodar (fitness coach)
- 2017: Al-Nasr (fitness coach)
- 2017–2018: CFR Cluj (fitness coach)
- 2018: Guizhou Hengfeng (fitness coach)
- 2019: Guizhou Hengfeng (fitness coach)
- 2020: CFR Cluj (fitness coach)
- 2020–2021: CFR Cluj (fitness coach)
- 2021: Kayserispor (fitness coach)
- 2021–2022: CFR Cluj (fitness coach)
- 2022–2023: CFR Cluj (fitness coach)
- 2023: Jeonbuk Hyundai Motors (fitness coach)
- 2024: Jeonbuk Hyundai Motors (fitness coach)
- 2024–2025: Sepsi OSK (fitness coach)
- 2026–: Bihor Oradea (fitness coach)
- * Club domestic league appearances and goals

Bogdan Aurelian Aldea (born 26 April 1981) is a former Romanian professional footballer who played as a midfielder, currently fitness coach at Liga II club Bihor Oradea.

== Playing career ==
Bogdan Aldea was born in Târgoviște and began his career at the Romanian club Dinamo București. At the date 12 June 1999 he played the first game in the national league for Dinamo București against Otelul Galati. He is known, as a football player, for winning the Romanian Cup and the Romanian Championship (Divizia A), in the season 1999-2000, both with Dinamo București.

== Fitness coach career ==
He started in the year 2012 to be a fitness coach. His first contract on this new position was with FC Dinamo Bucuresti. Bogdan Aldea won in the season 2017-2018 his first championship, as a fitness coach, with CFR Cluj.

== Honours ==
Dinamo București

- Divizia A: 1999–00
- Cupa României: 1999–00

Petrolul Ploiești

- Divizia B: 2002–03

Oțelul Galați

- Cupa României runner-up: 2003–04

Unirea Urziceni

- Cupa României runner-up: 2007–08

CSM Slatina

- Liga III: 2010–11

ACS Buftea

- Liga III: 2011–12
