= Victoraș Iacob =

Romanian footballer

Victoraş Iacob
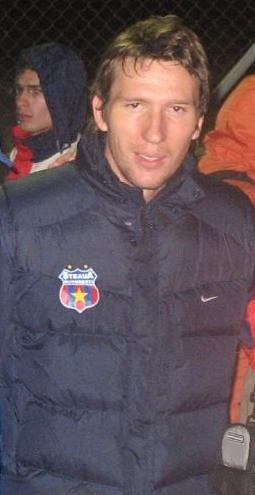

Personal information
- Full name: Victoraş Constantin Iacob
- Date of birth: 14 October 1980 (age 46)
- Place of birth: Râmnicu Vâlcea, Vâlcea County, Romania
- Height: 1.91 m (6 ft 3 in)
- Position: Forward

Senior career*
Years	Team	Apps	(Gls)
1999–2001	Rocar București	30	(4)
2001–2002	Universitatea Craiova	15	(3)
2002–2003	Progresul București	27	(4)
2003–2004	Oțelul Galați	14	(7)
2004	Rapid București	5	(0)
2004–2005	Oţelul Galaţi	28	(13)
2005–2008	Steaua Bucuresti	45	(13)
2008	1. FC Kaiserslautern	2	(0)
2009	CS Otopeni	7	(5)
2009–2011	Iraklis	42	(13)
2011	Aris	8	(0)
2012	Concordia Chiajna	3	(0)
2012	Niki Volos	7	(1)
Total		233	(63)

International career
	Romania U-21	5	(0)
- * Club domestic league appearances and goals

Victoraş Constantin Iacob (born 14 October 1980) is a Romanian former professional footballer who played as a forward.

== Club career ==
=== Rocar București ===
Iacob started to play professional football at Rocar București and played his first match in Liga I on 4 December 1999 against Argeș Pitești, but his team lost 3–1.

He helped his side reach the 2000–01 Romanian Cup final. Iacob played two seasons for AS Rocar București and scored 4 times in 30 games. In 2001, AS Rocar București was relegated to the second League, and the owner of the team, Gigi Nețoiu moved along with part of the players, including Iacob to Universitatea Craiova.

=== Universitatea Craiova ===
He played 15 games for Universitatea Craiova and scored three times. While he was playing for Universitatea, Iacob suffered an injury which kept him away from the field for a long period of time.

=== Progresul București ===
In 2002, Iacob was transferred to Progresul București also known as FC Național where he played in 27 games and scored 4 times.

=== Oțelul Galați ===
During the 2003–04 season, Iacob played half of the season for Oțelul Galați and the other half at Rapid București. Iacob did not manage to meet the expectations of Rapid officials and returned to Oțelul Galați.

The 2004–05 season was the best of his career. In 28 games he scored 13 goals and was noticed by Mihai Stoica, the general manager of Steaua București, who signed him on a free transfer.

=== FC FCSB ===
His first season for FCSB was a good one and they won the championship. He played in 22 games and scored five times.

His first season in the UEFA Cup in 2004–05 led to an extended cup run for FCSB. They qualified from a group which included Standard Liège, Beşiktaş, Sampdoria, and Athletic Bilbao and beat Valencia, a former UEFA Cup winner in the next knockout stage. However, they were eliminated in the quarter-finals by Villarreal.

The following season the club qualified for the UEFA Champions League but was beaten in the qualifying rounds by Rosenborg. They then played in the UEFA Cup group stages where they defeated teams like RC Lens, Heerenveen S.C., and Real Betis in the group stages and one of their traditional Romanian rivals, Rapid București, in the quarter-finals. FCSB played the semifinal but was beaten by Middlesbrough after two dramatic games.

In the 2006–07 season, FCSB qualified for the Champions League group stage, where they played Real Madrid, Lyon, and Dynamo Kyiv. However, Iacob suffered another injury in 2007 and did not manage to play any game in the Champions League.

He played 20 games in the European Cups with Steaua and scored 9 times.

At the start of 2008, he was transferred to 1. FC Kaiserslautern, in the 2. Bundesliga, for €500,000. He was injured in his early days at his new team and did not manage to help them avoid relegation, despite playing a couple of matches. He also spent a few months at CS Otopeni.

=== Iraklis ===
In the summer of 2009, Iacob moved to Iraklis on a free transfer. He played 24 matches and scored 11 goals in his first season in Greece. Iacob became a fan-favourite. He had a poor disciplinary record however and was nine times and sent off five times. At the beginning of the 2009–10 season, he was unable to offer his services (home against Olympiacos, Iraklis won 2–1) at his team due to a red card which he had received in the last match of the previous season. Iraklis' fans acknowledged his contribution giving him the Player of the Year award, in winter 2010 for the 2009–10 season.

In May 2011, he left the club, Iraklis having been blighted by financial problems which ultimately resulted in relegation from the top tier.

=== Aris ===
On 30 August 2011, Iacob signed a contract with Thessaloniki rivals, Aris.

== Honours ==
FCSB

- Divizia A: 2005–06
- Supercupa României: 2005–06
- UEFA Cup semifinalist: 2005–06
