= List of transfers of Liga I – 2007–08 season =

This is a list of Romanian football transfers for the 2007–08 transfer windows. Only moves featuring 2007–08 Liga I are listed.

== Summer window ==
This list is incomplete. Please feel free to expand

=== Ceahlăul Piatra Neamț ===
In:

- (Romania) Constantin Schumacher – From FC Argeș Pitești
- (Romania) Narcis Răducan – From free
- (Romania) Marius Iordache – From free
- (Romania) Mircea Oprea – From FCU Politehnica Timișoara
- (Romania) Rareș Soporan – Return to FCU Politehnica Timișoara
- (Romania) Lucian Goian – From FC Dinamo București
- (Romania) Florin Matache – From FC Dinamo București
- (Bosnia and Herzegovina) Vojislav Vranjković – from FC Dinamo București
- (Moldova) Alexandru Golban – from FC Dacia Chișinău
- (Ghana) Hamza Mohammed – from free
- (Portugal) Bruno Fernandes – From free

Out:

=== CFR Cluj ===
In:

- (Portugal) André Leão from SC Beira Mar for 250,000 euro
- (Romania) Radu Marginean from Gloria Bistrița from loan
- (Romania) Eugen Trică from CSKA Sofia as a free agent
- (Nigeria) Ibezito Ogbonna from Hapoel Tel Aviv as a free agent
- (Romania) Gabriel Mureșan from Gloria Bistrița for 150,000 euro plus 4 players
- (Sweden) Niklas Sandberg from AIK for 400,000 euro
- (Portugal) Amoreirinha from S.L. Benfica for 1,000,000 euro
- (Portugal) Nuno Claro from Paços de Ferreira as a free agent
- (Bolivia) Gualberto Mojica from F.C. Paços de Ferreira from loan
- (Argentina) (Italy) Cristian Fabbiani from Club Atlético Lanús for 1.600.000 euro
- (Argentina) Emmanuel Culio from Club de Deportes La Serena on loan until January 2008 for 100,000 euro
- (Chile) Nicolas Canales from Gondomar SC on loan from Benfica

Out:

- (Romania) Cosmin Tilincă to Gloria Bistrița as a part of Gabriel Mureșan's transfer fee
- (Romania) Cristian Coroian to Gloria Bistrița as a part of Gabriel Mureșan's transfer fee
- (Romania) Cristian Florin Dan to UT Arad for 110,000 euro
- (Paraguay) Miguel A. Cuellar to Club Bolívar from loan
- (Romania) (Germany) Robert Roszel to UT Arad for 100,000 euro
- (Romania) Martin Tudor to U Cluj for free
- (Romania) Romeo Surdu to Steaua Bucharest for EUR 1,000,000
- (Romania) Dorin Toma to Gloria Bistrița until June 2008
- (Portugal) Vitinha to CS Otopeni until June 2008
- (Romania) Alin Bota to CS Otopeni until June 2008
- (Moldova) Viorel Frunză to Ceahlăul Piatra Neamț until June 2008
- (Romania) Bogdan Bucurică to Gloria Bistrița until June 2008

=== FC Dinamo București ===
In:

- (Romania) Gabriel Boștină from Steaua București
- (Romania) Daniel Oprița from Steaua București
- (Romania) Cornel Predescu, end of loan at Gloria Bistrița
- (Romania) Florin Bratu from FC Nantes Atlantique
- (Romania) Valentin Năstase from Ascoli Calcio 1898
- (Romania) Ianis Zicu from FC Internazionale Milano
- (Romania) Hristu Chiacu from Wisła Kraków
- (Romania) Flavius Stoican from FC Shakhtar Donetsk
- (Romania) Silviu Izvoranu from Politehnica Știința Timișoara
- (Romania) Lucian Goian back from loan at Ceahlăul Piatra Neamț
- (Argentina) Mariano Fernandez from Nueva Chicago
- (Peru) John Galliquio from Universitario de Deportes

Out:

- (Romania) Florin Matache to Ceahlăul Piatra Neamț
- (Romania) Silviu Bălace to FC Vaslui
- (France) Fabrice Fernandes released
- (Romania) Valentin Nastase released
- (Bosnia and Herzegovina) Vojislav Vranjković to Ceahlăul Piatra Neamț
- (Romania) Sergiu Homei to FC Politehnica Iași

=== Farul Constanța ===
In:

- (Romania) Răzvan Stanca – Returned From Sportul Studențesc
- (Romania) Bogdan Apostu – Returned From UT Arad
- (Romania) George Ușurelu – Returned From Severnav Turnu-Severin
- (Romania) Viorel Gheorghe – Returned From FC Brașov
- (Senegal) Gaston Mendy – Signed From Estoril Futebol
- (Romania) Emil Nanu – Signed From Delta Tulcea
- (Romania) Ștefan Ciobanu – On loan From Delta Tulcea
- (Portugal) Paulo Monteiro – free agent
- (Guinea-Bissau) Celestino – free agent
- (Cameroon) Daniel Chigou – free agent
- (Romania) Mihai Guriță – On loan From Steaua București
- (Guinea-Bissau) Malá – free agent

Out:

- (Romania) Mihai Guriță – Transferred to Steaua București
- (Romania) Cosmin Tilincă – Returned to CFR Cluj
- (Romania) Marius Soare – On loan to Delta Tulcea
- (Romania) Alexandru Mățel – On loan to Delta Tulcea
- (Romania) Ionel Posteucă – On loan to Delta Tulcea
- (Romania) Adrian Senin – Free to FC Brașov

=== FC Politehnica Iași ===
In:

- (Romania) Cristian Lucian Munteanu from FC Sopron
- (Romania) Iosif Kalai from Jiul Petroșani
- (Romania) Sergiu Homei loaned from Dinamo București
- (Romania) Ciprian Milea from Dunărea Galați
- (Serbia) Branko Baković free

Out:

- (Croatia) (Argentina) Martin Šarič – end of contract
- (Romania) Claudiu Ionescu to Gloria Buzău
- (Romania) Răzvan Țârlea to Petrolul Ploiești
- (Romania) Dan Iurișniți to CSM Focșani
- (Romania) Irinel Ionescu to CS Otopeni

=== Politehnica Știința Timișoara ===
In:

- (Romania) Marian Aliuță free agent
- (Armenia) Arman Karamyan from Ceahlăul Piatra Neamț
- (Romania) Stelian Stancu from Steaua București for €250.000;
- (Romania) Ionel Ganea from Rapid București
- (Romania) Ciprian Dancia from Torpedo Moscow
- (Slovenia) Dare Vršič from MŠK Žilina for €800.000;
- (Romania) Alin Rațiu from Sportul Studențesc for €200.000;
- (Romania) Fabian Teușan from Jiul Petroșani for €200.000;
- (Slovenia) Dejan Rušič from NK MIK CM Celje for €200.000;;
- (Romania) Sebastian Cojocnean from CS Otopeni for €400.000;
- (Romania) Florin Sandu from CS Otopeni for €400.000;

Out:

- (Nigeria) Ifeanyi Emeghara to Steaua București for €1.200.000;
- (Romania) Ștefan Grigorie to Rapid București
- (Romania) Mircea Oprea to Ceahlăul Piatra Neamț
- (Romania) Adrian Olah to Universitatea Cluj for €200.000;
- (Romania) Lucian Turcu to Gloria Bistrița
- (Serbia) Ersin Mehmedovic to Unirea Urziceni
- (Romania) Silviu Izvoranu to Dinamo București for €650.000;
- (Romania) Mihăiță Pleșan to Steaua București for €820.000;
- (Romania) Adrian Ilie to FC Politehnica Iași
- (Romania) Cristian Scutaru to FCM Reșița
- (Romania) Cristian Zimmerann to FCM Reșița
- (Romania) Alexandru Popovici to FCM Reșița
- (Romania) Adrian Poparadu to FCM Reșița
- (Romania) Ionuț Matei to FCM Reșița
- (Romania) Rareș Soporan to FCM Reșița
- (Romania) Fabian Teușan to FCM Reșița
- (Romania) Cristian Gălan to FCM Reșița
- (Romania) Ioan Mera to FCM Reșița
- (Romania) Gabriel Siminic to FCM Reșița
- (Romania) Bogdan Străuț to FCM Reșița
- (Romania) Victor Rada to FCM Reșița
- (Romania) Răzvan Riviș to FCM Reșița
- (Romania) Florin Dochița to FCM Reșița
- (Romania) Mircea Axente to FCM Reșița

=== FC Rapid București ===
In:

- (Cameroon) Pierre Boya – Signed from FK Partizan Belgrade - €400.000;
- (Montenegro) Vladimir Božović – Signed from OFK Beograd - €300.000;
- (Romania) Stefan Grigorie – Signed from FCU Politehnica Timișoara -;
- (Brazil) Cesinha – Signed from Sporting de Braga for €600.000 -;
- (Brazil) Marcos Tamandaré – Signed from Sport Club Corinthians Paulista - for €100.000;
- (Brazil) Elinton Andrade – free;

Out:

- (Romania) Valentin Badoi – Signed with Steaua București - for €550.000
- (Romania) Ionel Ganea – Signed with FCU Politehnica Timișoara; – free
- (Romania) Viorel Moldovan – Retired
- (Romania) Ianis Zicu – End of loan
- (Armenia) Edel Bete – Loaned to Paris Saint Germain
- (Romania) Ionuț Alin Rada – Signed with Steaua București - for €800.000

=== FC Steaua București ===
In:

- (Romania) Eric Bicfalvi – Signed from CS Jiul Petroșani – EUR 300,000;
- (Romania) Valentin Bădoi – Signed from FC Rapid București – EUR 550,000;
- (Romania) Mihai Guriță – Signed from FC Farul Constanța – EUR 100,000;
- (Romania) Cosmin Vâtcă – Signed from FC Oțelul Galați – EUR 500,000;
- (Romania) Adrian Neaga – Signed from Seongnam Ilhwa Chunma – EUR 615,000;
- (Nigeria) Ifeanyi Emeghara – Signed from Politehnica Știința Timișoara – EUR 1,200,000;
- (Poland) Paweł Golański – Signed from Korona Kielce – EUR 1,300,000;
- (Romania) Alexandru Iacob – Signed from FC Corvinul Hunedoara – EUR 400,000;
- (Romania) Emil Ninu – Signed from FC Progresul București – EUR 200,000;
- (Colombia) Róbinson "Rufay" Zapata – Signed from Cúcuta Deportivo – EUR 1,000,000;
- (Romania) Ionuț Rada – Signed from FC Rapid București – EUR 800,000;
- (Romania) Dorel Zaharia – Signed from Gloria Bistrița – EUR 500,000;
- (Romania) Mihăiță Pleșan – Signed from Politehnica Știința Timișoara – EUR 1,500,000;
- (Romania) Romeo Surdu – Signed from CFR Cluj – EUR 1,000,000;

Out:

- (Romania) Daniel Oprița – Signed with FC Dinamo București – free;
- (Romania) Stelian Stancu – Signed with Politehnica Știința Timișoara – EUR 200,000;
- (Romania) Sorin Paraschiv – Signed with Rimini Calcio – EUR 500,000;
- (Brazil) Élton – Signed with Al Nasr – EUR 500,000;
- (France) Cyril Théréau – Signed with RSC Anderlecht – EUR 2,900,000;
- (Israel) Klemi Saban – Signed with Maccabi Netanya – free;
- (Romania) Gigel Coman – Signed with CFM Universitatea Cluj – EUR 100,000;
- (Romania) Gabriel Boștină – Signed with FC Dinamo București – EUR 100,000;
- (Romania) Mihai Guriță – Signed with FC Farul Constanța – free;
- (Romania) Răzvan Ochiroșii – on loan to FC Gloria Buzău until May 2008;
- (Romania) Cezar Lungu – on loan to FC Gloria Buzău until May 2008;
- (Romania) Alexandru Iacob – on loan to FC Gloria Buzău until May 2008;
- (Romania) Alexandru Tudose – on loan to FC Gloria Buzău until May 2008;
- (Romania) Alin Lițu – on loan to FC Gloria Buzău until May 2008;
- (Romania) Valentin Simion – on loan to FC Gloria Buzău until May 2008;

=== U Cluj ===
In:

- (Romania) Mugur Bolohan – from Nea Salamina;
- (Romania) Marius Baciu – from Oțelul Galați;
- (Serbia) Nemanja Jovanović – from Pandurii Târgu-Jiu - $175.000;
- (Montenegro) Milan Jovanović – from Unirea Urziceni - €119.000;
- (Romania) Martin Tudor – from CFR Cluj;
- (Romania) Cosmin Crușoveanu – from Corvinul Hunedoara - €40.000;
- (Romania) Adrian Olah – from FCU Politehnica Timișoara - €200.000;
- (Romania) Gigel Coman – from FC Steaua București - €100.000;
- (Armenia) Romik Khachatryan – from Unirea Urziceni - €50.000;
- (Romania) Sergiu Costea – from FC Dinamo București.

Out:

- (South Korea) Kim Jong-Chun – to Yong-in FC;
- (Romania) Ovidiu Stoianof – to Universitatea Craiova from loan;
- (Romania) Dănuț Șomcherechi – to FC Progresul București;
- (Romania) Marius Popescu – retired;
- (Romania) Codruț Lircă – to Ardealul Cluj;
- (Cameroon) Thierry Ekwalla – to CSM Râmnicu Vâlcea.
- (Romania) Bogdan Fărcaș on loan to Arieșul Turda;
- (Romania) Dan Văscan on loan to CS ISCT;
- (Romania) Călin Vădana on loan to Arieșul Turda;
- (Romania) Gheorghe Tăut on loan to Bihorul Beiuș;
- (Romania) Viorel Sântejudean on loan to CS ISCT;
- (Romania) Adrian Borza on loan to CS ISCT;
- (Romania) Tudor Dobrău on loan to unknown destination;
- (Romania) Morar Marius on loan to Bihorul Beiuș;
- (Romania) Vlad Petean on loan to unknown destination.

== Winter window ==
=== Ceahlăul Piatra Neamț ===
In:

- (Tunisia) Haykel Guemamdia – from RC Strasbourg;
- (Nigeria) Peter Omoduemuke – from Poli Timișoara;
- (Romania) Ionuț Matei – from Poli Timișoara;
- (Czech Republic) Martin Černoch – from Poli Iasi;
- (Slovakia) Ivan Pecha – from FC Senec;
- (Ukraine) Andrey Fedorenko – free;

Out:

- (Moldova) Alexandru Golban – free

=== CFR Cluj ===
In:

- (Canada) Lars Hirschfeld – from Rosenborg BK - EUR 1.300.000;
- (Argentina) Sebastián Dubarbier – from Olimpo - EUR 755.000;
- (Argentina) Diego Ruiz – from Huachipato – free agent;
- (Argentina) Sixto Peralta – from River Plate – free agent;
- (Sweden) Mikael Dorsin – from Rosenborg BK – free agent;

Out:

- (Bolivia) Gualberto Mojica – free agent;

=== Dinamo București ===
In:

- (Romania) Gabriel Torje – from Politehnica Știința Timișoara for EUR 2.000.000;
- (Argentina) Osvaldo Miranda – from Gimnasia y Esgrima de Jujuy for EUR 800.000;
- (Serbia) Nino Pekarić – from FK Vojvodina Novi Sad for EUR 800.000;
- (North Macedonia) Blaze Todorovski from FK Sileks Kratovo;
- (Moldova) Igor Bugaev from FC Chornomorets Odesa;

Out:

- (Argentina) Mariano Fernandez;
- (Serbia) Ivan Gvozdenović;

=== Farul Constanța ===
In:

- (Serbia) Mitar Pekovici form FK Čukarički Stankom;
- (Portugal) Chico from Varzim S.C.;
- (Brazil) Marx Santos from Palmeiras Youth;
- (Serbia) Dragan Gosic from FK Laktaši;

Out:

- (Guinea-Bissau) Celestino Ilnhasse;
- (Portugal) Paulo Monteiro;

=== Gloria Bistrița ===
In:

- (Serbia) Jasmin Trtovac to FK Novi Pazar;

Out:

- (Romania) László Sepsi to S.L. Benfica for EUR 1,800,000;
- (Brazil) Ayres Cerqueira Simao to FC Botosani;

=== Gloria Buzău ===
In:

- (Brazil) André Nunes from Steaua Bucharest;
- (Moldova) Ghenadie Ochincă – free agent;

Out:

- (Nigeria) Dino Eze to Steaua Bucharest;
- (Brazil) Kleyr Viera Dos Santos;
- (Brazil) Muller Santos da Silva;

=== Oțelul Galați ===
In:

- (Bulgaria) Stoyan Kolev;
- (Argentina) Gabriel Viglianti;

Out:

- (South Korea) Kim Gil-Sik;
- (Belarus) Pavel Byahanski;
- (Estonia) Eduard Ratnikov;
- (Moldova) Gheorghe Boghiu;

=== Pandurii Târgu Jiu ===
In:

- (Portugal) Mingote – from A.D. Lousada – free agent;
- (Cape Verde) Marco Soares – from U.D. Leiria – free agent;
- (Brazil) Jessui – from U.D. Leiria – free agent;
- (Brazil) Carlos Alexandre Cardoso – from C.F. Estrela da Amadora – free agent;
- (Brazil) José Anilton – from S.C. Braga – free agent;
- (Portugal) Carlos Pintassilgo – from Portimonense S.C. – free agent;
- (Spain) Ibón Pérez Arrieta – from Swindon Town – free agent;
- (North Macedonia) (Brazil) Wandeir – from Associação Naval 1º de Maio – free agent;
- (Chile) Diego di Gregorio – free agent;

Out:

- (Brazil) Edmílson
- (Bosnia and Herzegovina) Adnan Gušo

=== FC Politehnica Iași ===
In:

- (Senegal) Mohammed Manga – free agent;
- (Slovenia) Domen Beršnjak – free agent;
- (Slovenia) Andrej Pečnik – free agent;

Out:

- (Czech Republic) Martin Černoch – free agent;

=== FC Vaslui ===
In:

- (Senegal) Ousmane N'Doye – from Academica Coimbra;
- (Armenia) Galust Petrosyan – free agent;
- (Portugal) Hugo Luz – free agent;

=== Poli Timișoara ===
In:

- (Romania) Valentin Badoi – from Steaua for free;
- (Slovakia) Balázs Borbély – from Artmedia Bratislava;
- (Slovakia) Miloš Brezinský – from Sparta Prague;
- (Portugal) Carlos Milhazes – from Rio Ave F.C.;
- (Argentina) Elvio Raul Martinez – from Club Atlético Aldosivi;

Out:

- (Romania) Gabriel Torje – to Dinamo Bucharest for EUR 2.000.000;
- (Australia) Jonathan McKain – free agent;

=== Rapid București ===
In:

- (Portugal) João Paulo – from Uniao Leiria for EUR 1,250,000;
- (Serbia) Ranko Despotović – from FK Vojvodina for EUR 1,200,000;
- (Belgium) Philippe Léonard – from Feyenoord for free;
- (Latvia) Andrejs Rubins – from FC Spartak Moscow for free;
- (Portugal) Vasco Matos – from S.C. Beira-Mar;

=== FC Steaua București ===
In:

- (Peru) Andrés Mendoza – from FC Metalurh Donetsk for 'EUR 1,500,000;
- (Colombia) Dayro Moreno – from Once Caldas for EUR 1,400,000;
- (France) Mahamadou Habibou – from R. Charleroi S.C. for EUR 500,000;
- (Colombia) José Moreno – from Club Atlético Independiente for EUR 200,000;
- (Brazil) André Nunes – from Zagłębie Lubin for EUR 100,000;
- (Nigeria) Dino Eze – from Gloria Buzau;

Out:

- (Romania) Valentin Badoi – to Poli Timișoara for free;
- (Brazil) André Nunes – to Gloria Buzau;

=== Universitatea Cluj ===
In:

- (Romania) Cristian Silvășan – free agent;
- (Romania) Mircea Oltean – free agent;
- (Brazil) Andre Astroga – free agent;
- (Brazil) Fábio Bilica – free agent;
- (Brazil) Bayano – free agent;
- (Belgium) Pieter Merlier – free agent;
- (France) Fabien Boudarène – free agent;

Out:

- (Romania) Viorel Sântejudean on loan to Mureșul Deva;
- (Romania) Adrian Borza on loan to Mureșul Deva;
- (Romania) Cosmin Crușoveanu on loan to Corvinul Hunedoara;
- (Romania) Robert Villand – unknown destination;
- (Romania) Ciprian Suciu on loan to Arieșul Turda;
- (Romania) Sandu Negrean – unknown destination;
- (Romania) Emil Szolomajer on loan to Arieșul Turda;
- (Armenia) Romik Khachatryan – to APOP Kinyras Peyias FC;
- (Burkina Faso) Mamadou Zongo – free agent;
- (South Korea) Park Jae-hong – free agent;
- (Romania) Mugur Bolohan – free agent;
- (Romania) Marius Baciu – free agent.

=== Universitatea Craiova ===
Out:

- (Romania) Mădălin Ciucă – free agent;
- (Romania) Gabriel Velcovici – free agent;
- (Romania) Constantin Gărgălie – free agent;
- (Romania) Ovidiu Stoianof – free agent;

=== Unirea Urziceni ===
In:

- (Argentina) Pablo Brandán – free agent;
- (Lithuania) Giedrius Arlauskis – free agent;
- (Lithuania) Davidas Arlauskis – free agent;
- (Australia) Jacob Burns – free agent;
