= Codru =

Codru may refer to:

== Places ==
- Codru, Moldova, a suburb of Chișinău city
- Codru (forest), the area of ancient forests in the Central Moldavian Plateau
- Codru Massif or Central Moldavian Plateau
- Codru Reserve, in Strășeni District, Moldova
- Codru, village in Șoimi commune, Bihor County, Romania
- Codru, village in Cajvana town, Suceava County, Romania
- Codru, village in Mîndrești commune, Teleneşti district, Moldova
- Codru (wine), a Moldovan wine region

== Other uses ==
- Independent Engineer Battalion "Codru", of the Moldovan National Army
- Anatol Codru (1936–2010), writer and film director from Moldova

== See also ==
- Codreanu (surname), a Romanian surname
- Codreni (disambiguation)
- Codruț, a Romanian given name and surname
- Codrescu, a Romanian surname
