= Codreanu (surname) =

Codreanu is a Romanian surname. Notable people with the surname include:

- Alexandru Codreanu (born 1965), Moldovan diplomat
- Corneliu Zelea Codreanu (1899–1938), Romanian politician
- Corneliu Codreanu (footballer) (born 1977), Romanian football player
- Ilie Codreanu (born 1948), Romanian sport shooter
- Ina Codreanu (born 1985), Moldovan beauty queen
- Ion Codreanu (general) (1891–1960), Romanian general
- Ion Codreanu (politician) (1879–1949), Moldovan politician
- Lizica Codreanu-Fontenoy (1901–1993), dancer
- Mihai Codreanu (1876–1957), Romanian poet
- Nicolae Bosie-Codreanu (1885–1963), Bessarabian politician
- Roman Codreanu (1952–2001), Romanian wrestler
- Teofil Codreanu (1941–2016), Romanian footballer

== See also ==
- Codru (disambiguation)
- Codreni (disambiguation)
- Gheorghe Roșca Codreanu National College, Romania
