= Cristian Ciubotariu =

Romanian professional footballer

Personal information
- Full name: Cristian Valentin Ciubotariu
- Date of birth: 24 December 1980 (age 45)
- Place of birth: Bucharest, Romania
- Height: 1.76 m (5 ft 9 in)
- Position: Midfielder

Youth career
- 1987–1997: Sportul Studențesc

Senior career*
Years	Team	Apps	(Gls)
1997–2003	Sportul Studențesc	108	(16)
2003	Rapid București	5	(0)
2004	Dinamo București	7	(0)
2004	Politehnica Iași	8	(0)
2005	FC Vaslui	2	(0)
2005–2006	Unirea Urziceni	17	(3)
2006	Gloria Bistrița	2	(0)
2007–2008	Sportul Studențesc	25	(3)
2008–2010	Concordia Chiajna	58	(5)
2011	Delta Tulcea	3	(0)
2011–2012	Sportul Studențesc	1	(0)
2011–2012	Sportul Studențesc II	20	(3)
2012–2018	Edenkoben	115	(18)
Total		371	(48)
- * Club domestic league appearances and goals as of 14 March 2018

Cristian Valentin Ciubotariu (born 24 December 1980) is a Romanian professional footballer, who played as a midfielder in Romania and Germany. Ciubotariu grew up at Sportul Studențesc and played in Romania for various teams in the Liga I and Liga II, such as: Sportul Studențesc, Rapid București, Dinamo București, Politehnica Iași or Unirea Urziceni, among others.
