= Oae =

Oae may refer to:

- Oae (Attica), a deme of ancient Attica
- Marius Oae (born 1983), Romanian footballer

== See also ==
- OAE (disambiguation)
