= Codreni =

Codreni may refer to the following places:

== Romania ==
- Codreni, Mileanca Commune, Botoşani County
- Codreni, Gurbănești Commune, Călăraşi County
- Codreni, Roșiești Commune, Vaslui County

== Moldova ==
- Codreni, Cimișlia
- Codreni, Vălcineț, Ocnița

== See also ==
- Codru (disambiguation)
- Codreanu (surname)
