= Gheorghe Șoarece =

Romanian footballer

Personal information
- Date of birth: 5 December 1955
- Place of birth: Osica de Sus, Romania
- Date of death: 5 October 2009 (aged 53)
- Place of death: Osica de Sus, Romania
- Position: Forward

Youth career
- 1969–1972: Oltețul Osica

Senior career*
Years	Team	Apps	(Gls)
1972–1973	IOB Balș		
1973–1975	Dinamo Slatina		
1975–1983	Olt Scornicești	142	(46)
1983–1986	Brașov		
1986–1990	Inter Sibiu		
Total		142+	(46+)

Managerial career
- Oltețul Osica (manager)
- * Club domestic league appearances and goals as of 5 November 2019

Gheorghe Șoarece (5 December 1955 – 5 October 2009) was a Romanian professional footballer who played as a forward for teams such as FC Olt Scornicești, FCM Brașov and Inter Sibiu, among others.

== Career ==
Born in Osica de Sus, Olt County, Șoarece started his football player career in 1969 at the local team, Oltețul Osica, then being transferred by Constantin Ștefan at IOB Balș, in 1972. From Balș, he moved to Dinamo Slatina, then, in 1975 signed a contract with FC Olt Scornicești, the team based in Nicolae Ceaușescu's hometown and a protégé of the communist regime. At FC Olt, Șoarece reached the peak of his career, being the goalscorer of the club in the second league, then promoting in the Divizia A, where he played in 112 matches and scored 24 goals, also being named as the captain of the squad from Olt County. In the Romanian first division he debuted in August 1979, in a game between FC Olt and Olimpia Satu Mare, ended with the score of 6–0.

A real star in Scornicești, Șoarece chose in 1983 to move at FCM Brașov, where he was wanted by Dumitru Dragomir, chairman of the club and also former president of FC Olt. With "the yellow and blacks" Gheorghe Șoarece achieved a promotion in the Divizia A, then played two years in the top-flight, before moving to Inter Sibiu, where he achieved another promotion in the first league, followed by two years of football at the highest level.

He retired in 1990 after some health problems, of respiratory nature. After retirement Șoarece moved back in Osica de Sus and was occasionally the manager of the local team, Oltețul, at amateur level.

== Illness and death ==
Șoarece suffered of some respiratory problems since the end of his career as a footballer, fact that prompted him to withdraw from his activity. Although he suffered several neck surgery, the disease advanced in the later years and finally it brought him the end, at just 53 years old.

== Honours ==
Olt Scornicești

- Divizia B: 1978–79
- Divizia C: 1977–78

Brașov

- Divizia B: 1983–84

Inter Sibiu

- Divizia B: 1987–88
