= Gheorghe Iamandi =

Romanian footballer (1966–2024)

Personal information
- Date of birth: 7 April 1957
- Place of birth: Bucharest, Romania
- Date of death: 6 February 2024 (aged 66)
- Place of death: Tulcea, Romania
- Height: 1.72 m (5 ft 8 in)
- Position: Forward

Senior career*
Years	Team	Apps	(Gls)
1978–1979	Delta Tulcea	40	(34)
1980–1983	Olt Scornicești	106	(35)
1983–1984	Dinamo București	19	(5)
1984	CS Târgoviște		
1985	SC Bacău	11	(2)
1985–1986	Petrolul Ploiești	14	(0)
1986–1989	Delta Tulcea		
Total		190	(76)

Managerial career
- 2011–2013: Delta Tulcea
- * Club domestic league appearances and goals

Gheorghe Iamandi (7 April 1957 – 6 February 2024) was a Romanian football player and manager.

== Career ==
Iamandi was born on 7 April 1957 in Bucharest, Romania and began playing football in 1978 at Divizia B club Delta Tulcea, scoring 22 goals in his first season. In the middle of the 1979–80 season, he left Tulcea for Olt Scornicești where he made his Divizia A debut on 5 December 1979 under coach Dumitru Anescu in a 2–0 home loss to Politehnica Iași. He scored 14 goals in the 1981–82 season under the guidance of coach Florin Halagian, helping Olt earn a fourth place.

Iamandi spent the 1983–84 season at Dinamo București, helping the team win The Double at the end of it, scoring five goals in the 19 league matches coach Nicolae Dumitru used him. However, he did play in the 2–1 win over Steaua București in the Cupa României final. He also played three games with Dinamo in the European Cup campaign, including both legs in the semi-finals where they were defeated by Liverpool.

After his spell with Dinamo ended, Iamandi went to play for CS Târgoviște in Divizia B for half a year. Then he returned to first league football at SC Bacău. In 1985 he joined Petrolul Ploiești where on 8 June 1986 he made his last Divizia A appearance in a 3–0 loss to his former side, SC Bacău, totaling 150 matches with 42 goals in the competition. Iamandi ended his career in 1989, after playing three seasons for Delta Tulcea in Divizia B.

== After retirement ==
After ending his playing career, Iamandi worked as a manager at Delta Tulcea and as a police officer in Tulcea.

== Death ==
Iamandi died in Tulcea on 6 February 2024, at the age of 66. Shortly after his death, the Delta Municipal Stadium was renamed "Delta – Gheorghe Iamandi" in his honor.

== Honours ==
Dinamo București

- Divizia A: 1983–84
- Cupa României: 1983–84
