= 1978–79 Divizia B =

Divizia B
- Season: 1978–79
- Promoted: FCM Galați; Viitorul Scornicești; Universitatea Cluj-Napoca
- Relegated: Relon Ceahlăul Piatra Neamț; Drobeta Turnu-Severin; Mureșul Deva; Oltul Sfântu Gheorghe; Electroputere Craiova; CIL Sighetu Marmației; Victoria Tecuci; SN Oltenița; Victoria Călan; Constructorul Iași; Chimia Brazi; CFR Timișoara
- Top goalscorer: Gheorghe Iamandi (Series I, 21 goals); Gheorghe Șoarece (Series II, 21 goals); Octavian Platagă (Series III, 27 goals)

The 1978–79 Divizia B was the 39th season of the second tier of the Romanian football league system.

The format has been maintained to three series, each of them having eighteen teams. At the end of the season the winners of the series promoted to Divizia A and the last four places from each series relegated to Divizia C.

== Team changes ==
=== To Divizia B ===
Relegated from Divizia A

- FC Constanța
- Petrolul Ploiești
- FCM Reșița

Promoted from Divizia C

- Minerul Gura Humorului
- Constructorul Iași
- Progresul Brăila
- Chimia Brazi
- SN Oltenița
- Viitorul Scornicești
- Drobeta-Turnu Severin
- Minerul Anina
- Înfrățirea Oradea
- Minerul Cavnic
- Poiana Câmpina
- IS Câmpia Turzii

=== From Divizia B ===
Promoted to Divizia A

- Gloria Buzău
- Chimia Râmnicu Vâlcea
- FC Baia Mare

Relegated to Divizia C

- CFR Pașcani
- Celuloza Călărași
- Minerul Lupeni
- CSU Galați
- Carpați Sinaia
- Armătura Zalău
- CS Botoșani
- Pandurii Târgu Jiu
- Victoria Carei
- Relonul Săvinești
- Prahova Ploiești
- Avântul Reghin

=== Other changes ===
- Progresul București was renamed Progresul Vulcan București.
- Unirea Alexandria was renamed Rulmentul Alexandria.
- Ceahlăul Piatra Neamț and Relonul Săvinești merged, the second one being absorbed by the first one. After the merge, Ceahlăul was renamed Relon Ceahlăul Piatra Neamț.

== League tables ==
=== Serie I ===
Pos	Team	Pld	W	D	L	GF	GA	GD	Pts	Promotion or relegation
1	FCM Galați (C, P)	34	23	4	7	67	32	+35	50	Promotion to Divizia A
2	Steagul Roșu Brașov	34	21	4	9	63	27	+36	46	
3	CSM Suceava	34	18	5	11	57	35	+22	41	
4	FC Constanța	34	17	2	15	50	34	+16	36	
5	Viitorul Vaslui	34	15	5	14	39	47	−8	35	
6	Delta Tulcea	34	16	2	16	49	42	+7	34	
7	FC Brăila	34	15	3	16	43	42	+1	33	
8	ICIM Brașov	34	13	6	15	46	47	−1	32	
9	Muscelul Câmpulung	34	15	2	17	48	55	−7	32	
10	Progresul Brăila	34	13	6	15	38	46	−8	32	
11	Nitramonia Făgăraș	34	13	6	15	43	51	−8	32	
12	Minerul Gura Humorului	34	14	4	16	33	50	−17	32	
13	Portul Constanța	34	14	3	17	49	51	−2	31	
14	Tractorul Brașov	34	14	3	17	51	54	−3	31	
15	Relon Ceahlăul Piatra Neamț (R)	34	14	3	17	30	42	−12	31	Relegation to Divizia C
16	Oltul Sfântu Gheorghe (R)	34	13	5	16	39	52	−13	31	Relegation to Divizia C
17	Victoria Tecuci (R)	34	14	2	18	55	65	−10	30	Relegation to Divizia C
18	Constructorul Iași (R)	34	8	7	19	30	58	−28	23	Relegation to Divizia C

Source: romaniansoccer.ro (in Romanian)
Rules for classification: 1) Points; 2) Goal difference; 3) Goals scored; 4) Head-to-head points; 5) Head-to-head goal difference; 6) Head-to-head goals scored; 7) Head-to-head away goals scored.
(C) Champions; (P) Promoted; (R) Relegated

=== Top scorers ===
The Series I top scorers:

21 goals

- (Romania) Gheorghe Iamandi (Delta Tulcea)

20 goals

- (Romania) Cristinel Rusu (Victoria Tecuci)

18 goals

- (Romania) Funkstein (ICIM Brașov)

14 goals

- (Romania) Corendea (Portul Constanța)
- (Romania) Marian Paraschivescu (Steagul Roșu Brașov)

13 goals

- (Romania) Valentin Cramer (FCM Galați)
- (Romania) Constantin Ignat (FC Constanța)

12 goals

- (Romania) Adrian Florea (FCM Galați)
- (Romania) Gheorghe Ciorîia (Minerul Gura Humorului)
- (Romania) Leonid Boriceanu (Tractorul Brașov)

=== Serie II ===
Pos	Team	Pld	W	D	L	GF	GA	GD	Pts	Promotion or relegation
1	Viitorul Scornicești (C, P)	34	20	3	11	57	33	+24	43	Promotion to Divizia A
2	Metalul București	34	17	7	10	49	31	+18	41	
3	Metalul Plopeni	34	18	4	12	50	31	+19	40	
4	Rulmentul Alexandria	34	15	8	11	32	28	+4	38	
5	Petrolul Ploiești	34	17	3	14	52	32	+20	37	
6	Rapid București	34	12	13	9	54	34	+20	37	
7	Poiana Câmpina	34	16	3	15	57	51	+6	35	
8	Progresul Vulcan București	34	15	5	14	40	39	+1	35	
9	Gaz Metan Mediaș	34	13	9	12	37	38	−1	35	
10	FCM Giurgiu	34	13	9	12	30	42	−12	35	
11	Autobuzul București	34	14	6	14	47	40	+7	34	
12	Dinamo Slatina	34	13	7	14	55	54	+1	33	
13	Șoimii Sibiu	34	12	9	13	40	41	−1	33	
14	Chimia Turnu Măgurele	34	13	6	15	33	51	−18	32	
15	Drobeta-Turnu Severin (R)	34	14	3	17	41	49	−8	31	Relegation to Divizia C
16	Electroputere Craiova (R)	34	13	4	17	36	55	−19	30	Relegation to Divizia C
17	SN Oltenița (R)	34	7	9	18	32	56	−24	23	Relegation to Divizia C
18	Chimia Brazi (R)	34	7	6	21	33	70	−37	20	Relegation to Divizia C

Source: romaniansoccer.ro (in Romanian)
Rules for classification: 1) Points; 2) Goal difference; 3) Goals scored; 4) Head-to-head points; 5) Head-to-head goal difference; 6) Head-to-head goals scored; 7) Head-to-head away goals scored.
(C) Champions; (P) Promoted; (R) Relegated

=== Top scorers ===
The Series II top scorers:

21 goals

- (Romania) Gheorghe Șoarece (Viitorul Scornicești)

16 goals

- (Romania) Preda (Poiana Câmpina)
- (Romania) Nicolae Sultănoiu (Autobuzul București)

15 goals

- (Romania) Marian Spiridon (Metalul Plopeni)

13 goals

- (Romania) Eremia Șumulanschi (Metalul București)
- (Romania) Puchea (SN Oltenița)

12 goals

- (Romania) Libiu (Poiana Câmpina)
- (Romania) Florea Voicilă (Rulmentul Alexandria)
- (Romania) Traian Frățilă (Șoimii Sibiu)
- (Romania) Ioan Furnea (Dinamo Slatina)
- (Romania) Virgil Mincioagă (Dinamo Slatina)

=== Serie III ===
Pos	Team	Pld	W	D	L	GF	GA	GD	Pts	Promotion or relegation
1	Universitatea Cluj-Napoca (C, P)	34	21	4	9	73	23	+50	46	Promotion to Divizia A
2	Gloria Bistrița	34	19	4	11	69	34	+35	42	
3	FCM Reșița	34	14	8	12	57	40	+17	36	
4	CFR Cluj-Napoca	34	16	4	14	48	42	+6	36	
5	Aurul Brad	34	16	3	15	53	46	+7	35	
6	Minerul Anina	34	16	2	16	55	47	+8	34	
7	Chimica Târnăveni	34	16	2	16	52	56	−4	34	
8	Minerul Cavnic	34	15	4	15	50	68	−18	34	
9	IS Câmpia Turzii	34	15	3	16	54	44	+10	33	
10	UM Timișoara	34	13	7	14	43	49	−6	33	
11	Minerul Moldova Nouă	34	15	3	16	37	49	−12	33	
12	Metalurgistul Cugir	34	14	5	15	43	55	−12	33	
13	Dacia Orăștie	34	14	5	15	33	46	−13	33	
14	Înfrățirea Oradea	34	14	4	16	40	45	−5	32	
15	Mureșul Deva (R)	34	14	4	16	39	48	−9	32	Relegation to Divizia C
16	CIL Sighetu Marmației (R)	34	13	5	16	45	59	−14	31	Relegation to Divizia C
17	Victoria Călan (R)	34	13	3	18	30	67	−37	29	Relegation to Divizia C
18	CFR Timișoara (R)	34	12	2	20	52	55	−3	26	Relegation to Divizia C

Source: romaniansoccer.ro (in Romanian)
Rules for classification: 1) Points; 2) Goal difference; 3) Goals scored; 4) Head-to-head points; 5) Head-to-head goal difference; 6) Head-to-head goals scored; 7) Head-to-head away goals scored.
(C) Champions; (P) Promoted; (R) Relegated

=== Top scorers ===
The Series III top scorers:

27 goals

- (Romania) Octavian Platagă (Minerul Anina)

23 goals

- (Romania) Mihai Gabel (FCM Reșița)

22 goals

- (Romania) Vasile Moga (Gloria Bistrița)

18 goals

- (Romania) Septimiu Câmpeanu (Universitatea Cluj-Napoca)

17 goals

- (Romania) Ioan Vesa (IS Câmpia Turzii)

16 goals

- (Romania) Ladislau Ghiță (Aurul Brad)

12 goals

- (Romania) Augustin Țegean (CFR Cluj-Napoca)
- (Romania) Floare (Metalurgistul Cugir)
- (Romania) Levente Marton (Chimica Târnăveni)
- (Romania) Grigore Butuza (Gloria Bistrița)

== See also ==
- 1978–79 Divizia A
- 1978–79 Divizia C
- 1978–79 County Championship
- 1978–79 Cupa României
