= 1977–78 Divizia C =

Third tier Romanian football league

Divizia C
- Season: 1977–78

The 1977–78 Divizia C was the 22nd season of Liga III, the third tier of the Romanian football league system.

== Team changes ==
=== To Divizia C ===
Relegated from Divizia B

- Unirea Focșani
- Flacăra-Automecanica Moreni
- Sticla Arieșul Turda
- Borzești
- Voința București
- Rapid Arad
- Minerul Gura Humorului
- Șantierul Naval Oltenița
- IS Câmpia Turzii
- Olimpia Râmnicu Sărat
- Tehnometal București
- Minerul Cavnic

Promoted from County Championship

- Zimbrul Suceava
- Siretul Bucecea
- Aripile Bacău
- Flacăra Murgeni
- Chimpex Constanța
- Oțelul Galați
- Granitul Babadag
- Petrolul Băicoi
- Petrolul Berca
- Victoria Lehliu
- Mecanică Fină București
- Automobilul Curtea de Argeș
- Electrodul Slatina
- Constructorul Târgu Jiu
- Mecanizatorul Șimian
- Minerul Oravița
- Minerul Vulcan
- Minerul Ilba-Seini
- Rapid Jibou
- Oțelul Reghin
- CM Cluj-Napoca
- Hebe Sângeorz-Băi
- IUPS Miercurea Ciuc
- Carpați Mârșa

=== From Divizia C ===
Promoted to Divizia B

- CS Botoșani
- Viitorul Vaslui
- Carpați Sinaia
- Tulcea
- Autobuzul București
- Muscelul Câmpulung
- Pandurii Târgu Jiu
- Minerul Moldova Nouă
- Victoria Carei
- Avântul Reghin
- ICIM Brașov
- Gaz Metan Mediaș

Relegated to County Championship

- Danubiana Roman
- Foresta Moldovița
- Hușana Huși
- Textila Buhuși
- Recolta Săhăteni
- Metalosport Galați
- Șantierul Naval Constanța
- Gloria Poarta Albă
- Viitorul Chirnogi
- Olimpia Giurgiu
- Răsăritul Caracal
- Oțelul Târgoviște
- Laminorul IPA Slatina
- Dunărea Calafat
- Ceramica Jimbolia
- Banatul Timișoara
- Gloria Șimleu Silvaniei
- Victoria Zalău
- Cimentul Turda
- Minerul Borșa
- Mureșul Toplița
- Măgura Codlea
- CIL Blaj
- Textila Sebeș

=== Renamed teams ===
Chimia Mărășești was renamed as Demar Mărășești.

Dunărea Tulcea was renamed as Pescărușul Tulcea.

Dunărea Cernavodă was renamed as Șoimii Cernavodă.

Forestierul Târgu Secuiesc was renamed as Metalul Târgu Secuiesc.

Unirea Sfântu Gheorghe was renamed as CPL Sfântu Gheorghe.

FIL Orăștie was renamed as IM Orăștie.

Laminorul Teliuc was renamed as Metalul Hunedoara.

=== Other changes ===
Unirea Siret took the place of Progresul Fălticeni.

== League tables ==
=== Seria I ===
| Pos | Team | Pld | W | D | L | GF | GA | GD | Pts | Promotion or relegation |
|---|---|---|---|---|---|---|---|---|---|---|
| 1 | Minerul Gura Humorului (C, P) | 30 | 20 | 2 | 8 | 65 | 28 | +37 | 42 | Promotion to Divizia B |
| 2 | Laminorul Roman | 30 | 16 | 6 | 8 | 58 | 31 | +27 | 38 | |
| 3 | Metalul Rădăuți | 30 | 18 | 1 | 11 | 63 | 39 | +24 | 37 | |
| 4 | Foresta Fălticeni | 30 | 16 | 5 | 9 | 44 | 29 | +15 | 37 | |
| 5 | Avântul TCMM Frasin | 30 | 15 | 7 | 8 | 45 | 33 | +12 | 37 | |
| 6 | Dorna Vatra Dornei | 30 | 15 | 3 | 12 | 60 | 39 | +21 | 33 | |
| 7 | Zimbrul Suceava | 30 | 15 | 2 | 13 | 54 | 42 | +12 | 32 | |
| 8 | Cetatea Târgu Neamț | 30 | 14 | 4 | 12 | 52 | 45 | +7 | 32 | |
| 9 | Cristalul Dorohoi | 30 | 14 | 3 | 13 | 55 | 39 | +16 | 31 | |
| 10 | Cimentul Bicaz | 30 | 12 | 4 | 14 | 42 | 46 | −4 | 28 | |
| 11 | Metalul Botoșani | 30 | 13 | 2 | 15 | 39 | 46 | −7 | 28 | |
| 12 | Siretul Bucecea | 30 | 12 | 4 | 14 | 38 | 56 | −18 | 28 | |
| 13 | ASA Câmpulung Moldovenesc | 30 | 11 | 5 | 14 | 34 | 45 | −11 | 27 | |
| 14 | Bradul Roznov | 30 | 9 | 6 | 15 | 32 | 47 | −15 | 24 | |
| 15 | ITA Piatra Neamț (R) | 30 | 5 | 4 | 21 | 31 | 80 | −49 | 14 | Relegation to County Championship |
| 16 | Unirea Siret (R) | 30 | 4 | 4 | 22 | 25 | 92 | −67 | 12 | Relegation to County Championship |

Source: romaniansoccer.ro
Rules for classification: 1) points; 2) goal difference; 3) number of goals scored.
(C) Champions; (P) Promoted; (R) Relegated

=== Seria II ===
| Pos | Team | Pld | W | D | L | GF | GA | GD | Pts | Promotion or relegation |
|---|---|---|---|---|---|---|---|---|---|---|
| 1 | Constructorul Iași (C, P) | 30 | 22 | 5 | 3 | 85 | 20 | +65 | 49 | Promotion to Divizia B |
| 2 | Borzești | 30 | 18 | 6 | 6 | 79 | 24 | +55 | 42 | |
| 3 | Letea Bacău | 30 | 16 | 7 | 7 | 76 | 21 | +55 | 39 | |
| 4 | Energia Gheorghiu-Dej | 30 | 17 | 5 | 8 | 57 | 23 | +34 | 39 | |
| 5 | Petrolul Moinești | 30 | 16 | 2 | 12 | 48 | 36 | +12 | 34 | |
| 6 | Demar Mărășești | 30 | 14 | 6 | 10 | 36 | 42 | −6 | 34 | |
| 7 | Partizanul Bacău | 30 | 14 | 4 | 12 | 48 | 42 | +6 | 32 | |
| 8 | Minerul Comănești | 30 | 14 | 3 | 13 | 52 | 43 | +9 | 31 | |
| 9 | Constructorul Vaslui | 30 | 12 | 4 | 14 | 32 | 50 | −18 | 28 | |
| 10 | Rulmentul Bârlad | 30 | 12 | 3 | 15 | 29 | 35 | −6 | 27 | |
| 11 | Nicolina Iași | 30 | 9 | 6 | 15 | 33 | 47 | −14 | 24 | |
| 12 | Oituz Târgu Ocna | 30 | 9 | 5 | 16 | 26 | 51 | −25 | 23 | |
| 13 | Tepro Iași | 30 | 9 | 4 | 17 | 27 | 49 | −22 | 22 | |
| 14 | Aripile Bacău | 30 | 8 | 5 | 17 | 28 | 61 | −33 | 21 | |
| 15 | Flacăra Murgeni (R) | 30 | 8 | 3 | 19 | 33 | 86 | −53 | 19 | Relegation to County Championship |
| 16 | Petrolistul Dărmănești (R) | 30 | 6 | 4 | 20 | 23 | 82 | −59 | 16 | Relegation to County Championship |

Source: romaniansoccer.ro
Rules for classification: 1) points; 2) goal difference; 3) number of goals scored.
(C) Champions; (P) Promoted; (R) Relegated

=== Seria III ===
| Pos | Team | Pld | W | D | L | GF | GA | GD | Pts | Promotion or relegation |
|---|---|---|---|---|---|---|---|---|---|---|
| 1 | Progresul Brăila (C, P) | 30 | 23 | 3 | 4 | 72 | 22 | +50 | 49 | Promotion to Divizia B |
| 2 | Ancora Galați | 30 | 18 | 6 | 6 | 56 | 22 | +34 | 42 | |
| 3 | Unirea Tricolor Brăila | 30 | 15 | 9 | 6 | 55 | 25 | +30 | 39 | |
| 4 | Cimentul Medgidia | 30 | 16 | 6 | 8 | 54 | 34 | +20 | 38 | |
| 5 | IMU Medgidia | 30 | 15 | 6 | 9 | 40 | 32 | +8 | 36 | |
| 6 | Electrica Constanța | 30 | 15 | 4 | 11 | 52 | 38 | +14 | 34 | |
| 7 | Pescărușul Tulcea | 30 | 16 | 1 | 13 | 52 | 34 | +18 | 33 | |
| 8 | Chimpex Constanța | 30 | 12 | 8 | 10 | 52 | 46 | +6 | 32 | |
| 9 | Șoimii Cernavodă | 30 | 12 | 7 | 11 | 37 | 36 | +1 | 31 | |
| 10 | Unirea Știința Eforie Nord | 30 | 12 | 5 | 13 | 33 | 43 | −10 | 29 | |
| 11 | Oțelul Galați | 30 | 11 | 3 | 16 | 39 | 41 | −2 | 25 | |
| 12 | Dacia Unirea Brăila | 30 | 8 | 5 | 17 | 31 | 59 | −28 | 21 | |
| 13 | Granitul Babadag | 30 | 8 | 5 | 17 | 32 | 66 | −34 | 21 | |
| 14 | Marina Mangalia | 30 | 9 | 1 | 20 | 40 | 65 | −25 | 19 | |
| 15 | Autobuzul Făurei (R) | 30 | 5 | 8 | 17 | 26 | 58 | −32 | 18 | Relegation to County Championship |
| 16 | Minerul Măcin (R) | 30 | 5 | 3 | 22 | 24 | 74 | −50 | 13 | Relegation to County Championship |

Source: romaniansoccer.ro
Rules for classification: 1) points; 2) goal difference; 3) number of goals scored.
(C) Champions; (P) Promoted; (R) Relegated

=== Seria IV ===
| Pos | Team | Pld | W | D | L | GF | GA | GD | Pts | Promotion or relegation |
|---|---|---|---|---|---|---|---|---|---|---|
| 1 | Chimia Brazi (C, P) | 30 | 21 | 5 | 4 | 66 | 17 | +49 | 47 | Promotion to Divizia B |
| 2 | Unirea Focșani | 30 | 18 | 4 | 8 | 72 | 24 | +48 | 40 | |
| 3 | Dinamo Focșani | 30 | 18 | 4 | 8 | 69 | 31 | +38 | 40 | |
| 4 | Chimia Buzău | 30 | 14 | 7 | 9 | 54 | 36 | +18 | 35 | |
| 5 | Azotul Slobozia | 30 | 16 | 2 | 12 | 55 | 50 | +5 | 34 | |
| 6 | Petrolul Băicoi | 30 | 10 | 9 | 11 | 41 | 43 | −2 | 29 | |
| 7 | Petrolul Berca | 30 | 13 | 3 | 14 | 39 | 56 | −17 | 29 | |
| 8 | Olimpia Râmnicu Sărat | 30 | 12 | 4 | 14 | 34 | 30 | +4 | 28 | |
| 9 | Luceafărul Focșani | 30 | 12 | 4 | 14 | 40 | 44 | −4 | 28 | |
| 10 | Avântul Măneciu | 30 | 13 | 2 | 15 | 36 | 45 | −9 | 28 | |
| 11 | Foresta Gugești | 30 | 10 | 5 | 15 | 40 | 68 | −28 | 25 | |
| 12 | Petrolistul Boldești | 30 | 10 | 4 | 16 | 34 | 44 | −10 | 24 | |
| 13 | Victoria Țăndărei | 30 | 10 | 4 | 16 | 33 | 56 | −23 | 24 | |
| 14 | Victoria Lehliu | 30 | 10 | 4 | 16 | 28 | 56 | −28 | 24 | |
| 15 | Petrolul Teleajen Ploiești (R) | 30 | 10 | 3 | 17 | 32 | 53 | −21 | 23 | Relegation to County Championship |
| 16 | Victoria Florești (R) | 30 | 7 | 8 | 15 | 23 | 43 | −20 | 22 | Relegation to County Championship |

Source: romaniansoccer.ro
Rules for classification: 1) points; 2) goal difference; 3) number of goals scored.
(C) Champions; (P) Promoted; (R) Relegated

=== Seria V ===
| Pos | Team | Pld | W | D | L | GF | GA | GD | Pts | Promotion or relegation |
|---|---|---|---|---|---|---|---|---|---|---|
| 1 | Șantierul Naval Oltenița (C, P) | 30 | 15 | 9 | 6 | 40 | 15 | +25 | 39 | Promotion to Divizia B |
| 2 | Automatica București | 30 | 12 | 12 | 6 | 43 | 27 | +16 | 36 | |
| 3 | Tehnometal București | 30 | 14 | 7 | 9 | 39 | 34 | +5 | 35 | |
| 4 | ICSIM București | 30 | 14 | 6 | 10 | 44 | 32 | +12 | 34 | |
| 5 | Unirea Tricolor București | 30 | 10 | 14 | 6 | 30 | 22 | +8 | 34 | |
| 6 | Electronica Obor București | 30 | 13 | 7 | 10 | 31 | 28 | +3 | 33 | |
| 7 | Abatorul București | 30 | 13 | 6 | 11 | 36 | 32 | +4 | 32 | |
| 8 | Sirena București | 30 | 11 | 10 | 9 | 38 | 41 | −3 | 32 | |
| 9 | Automecanica București | 30 | 13 | 4 | 13 | 36 | 34 | +2 | 30 | |
| 10 | Voința București | 30 | 9 | 12 | 9 | 25 | 29 | −4 | 30 | |
| 11 | TMB București | 30 | 10 | 9 | 11 | 31 | 29 | +2 | 29 | |
| 12 | Flacăra Roșie București | 30 | 9 | 11 | 10 | 26 | 28 | −2 | 29 | |
| 13 | Mecanică Fină București | 30 | 8 | 11 | 11 | 34 | 29 | +5 | 27 | |
| 14 | Avântul Urziceni | 30 | 9 | 7 | 14 | 33 | 56 | −23 | 25 | |
| 15 | Șoimii Tarom București (R) | 30 | 3 | 12 | 15 | 24 | 42 | −18 | 18 | Relegation to County Championship |
| 16 | IOR București (R) | 30 | 6 | 5 | 19 | 26 | 58 | −32 | 17 | Relegation to County Championship |

Source: romaniansoccer.ro
Rules for classification: 1) points; 2) goal difference; 3) number of goals scored.
(C) Champions; (P) Promoted; (R) Relegated

=== Seria VI ===
| Pos | Team | Pld | W | D | L | GF | GA | GD | Pts | Promotion or relegation |
|---|---|---|---|---|---|---|---|---|---|---|
| 1 | Viitorul Scornicești (C, P) | 30 | 23 | 1 | 6 | 95 | 24 | +71 | 47 | Promotion to Divizia B |
| 2 | Flacăra-Automecanica Moreni | 30 | 21 | 5 | 4 | 71 | 17 | +54 | 47 | |
| 3 | Progresul Corabia | 30 | 17 | 6 | 7 | 55 | 27 | +28 | 40 | |
| 4 | Dacia Pitești | 30 | 15 | 6 | 9 | 68 | 42 | +26 | 36 | |
| 5 | Rova Roșiorii de Vede | 30 | 14 | 7 | 9 | 45 | 28 | +17 | 35 | |
| 6 | Metalul Mija | 30 | 14 | 6 | 10 | 45 | 34 | +11 | 34 | |
| 7 | Progresul Pucioasa | 30 | 10 | 8 | 12 | 37 | 37 | 0 | 28 | |
| 8 | Petrolul Videle | 30 | 9 | 10 | 11 | 31 | 33 | −2 | 28 | |
| 9 | Cetatea Turnu Măgurele | 30 | 9 | 8 | 13 | 36 | 44 | −8 | 26 | |
| 10 | Automobilul Curtea de Argeș | 30 | 9 | 8 | 13 | 39 | 53 | −14 | 26 | |
| 11 | Recolta Stoicănești | 30 | 12 | 2 | 16 | 33 | 69 | −36 | 26 | |
| 12 | Cimentul Fieni | 30 | 8 | 9 | 13 | 28 | 49 | −21 | 25 | |
| 13 | Constructorul Pitești | 30 | 10 | 2 | 18 | 38 | 68 | −30 | 22 | |
| 14 | Chimia Găești | 30 | 7 | 7 | 16 | 30 | 54 | −24 | 21 | |
| 15 | Electrodul Slatina (R) | 30 | 8 | 4 | 18 | 31 | 81 | −50 | 20 | Relegation to County Championship |
| 16 | Petrolul Târgoviște (R) | 30 | 6 | 7 | 17 | 29 | 51 | −22 | 19 | Relegation to County Championship |

Source: romaniansoccer.ro
Rules for classification: 1) points; 2) goal difference; 3) number of goals scored.
(C) Champions; (P) Promoted; (R) Relegated

=== Seria VII ===
| Pos | Team | Pld | W | D | L | GF | GA | GD | Pts | Promotion or relegation |
|---|---|---|---|---|---|---|---|---|---|---|
| 1 | Drobeta-Turnu Severin (C, P) | 30 | 18 | 9 | 3 | 73 | 16 | +57 | 45 | Promotion to Divizia B |
| 2 | Lotru Brezoi | 30 | 15 | 6 | 9 | 49 | 34 | +15 | 36 | |
| 3 | Chimistul Râmnicu Vâlcea | 30 | 15 | 6 | 9 | 38 | 26 | +12 | 36 | |
| 4 | Știința Petroșani | 30 | 13 | 8 | 9 | 55 | 30 | +25 | 34 | |
| 5 | IOB Balș | 30 | 17 | 0 | 13 | 53 | 36 | +17 | 34 | |
| 6 | Dierna Orșova | 30 | 14 | 6 | 10 | 48 | 39 | +9 | 34 | |
| 7 | Minerul Motru | 30 | 15 | 3 | 12 | 43 | 40 | +3 | 33 | |
| 8 | Metalurgistul Sadu | 30 | 13 | 4 | 13 | 35 | 42 | −7 | 30 | |
| 9 | CFR Craiova | 30 | 13 | 2 | 15 | 48 | 46 | +2 | 28 | |
| 10 | Progresul Băilești | 30 | 11 | 6 | 13 | 33 | 38 | −5 | 28 | |
| 11 | Minerul Rovinari | 30 | 12 | 4 | 14 | 25 | 44 | −19 | 28 | |
| 12 | Constructorul Târgu Jiu | 30 | 11 | 5 | 14 | 38 | 51 | −13 | 27 | |
| 13 | Unirea Drăgășani | 30 | 11 | 4 | 15 | 39 | 47 | −8 | 26 | |
| 14 | Constructorul TCI Craiova | 30 | 11 | 2 | 17 | 54 | 57 | −3 | 24 | |
| 15 | Unirea Drobeta-Turnu Severin (R) | 30 | 11 | 2 | 17 | 45 | 69 | −24 | 24 | Relegation to County Championship |
| 16 | Mecanizatorul Șimian (R) | 30 | 5 | 3 | 22 | 25 | 86 | −61 | 13 | Relegation to County Championship |

Source: romaniansoccer.ro
Rules for classification: 1) points; 2) goal difference; 3) number of goals scored.
(C) Champions; (P) Promoted; (R) Relegated

=== Seria VIII ===
| Pos | Team | Pld | W | D | L | GF | GA | GD | Pts | Promotion or relegation |
|---|---|---|---|---|---|---|---|---|---|---|
| 1 | Minerul Anina (C, P) | 30 | 17 | 7 | 6 | 56 | 24 | +32 | 41 | Promotion to Divizia B |
| 2 | Unirea Tomnatic | 30 | 14 | 5 | 11 | 50 | 28 | +22 | 33 | |
| 3 | CFR Simeria | 30 | 14 | 3 | 13 | 45 | 42 | +3 | 31 | |
| 4 | Metalul Oțelu Roșu | 30 | 14 | 3 | 13 | 48 | 52 | −4 | 31 | |
| 5 | Laminorul Nădrag | 30 | 14 | 2 | 14 | 48 | 43 | +5 | 30 | |
| 6 | Unirea Sânnicolau Mare | 30 | 14 | 2 | 14 | 43 | 42 | +1 | 30 | |
| 7 | Metalul Hunedoara | 30 | 12 | 6 | 12 | 33 | 34 | −1 | 30 | |
| 8 | Gloria Reșița | 30 | 14 | 2 | 14 | 52 | 54 | −2 | 30 | |
| 9 | Vulturii Textila Lugoj | 30 | 12 | 5 | 13 | 43 | 33 | +10 | 29 | |
| 10 | Electromotor Timișoara | 30 | 14 | 1 | 15 | 50 | 51 | −1 | 29 | |
| 11 | Minerul Oravița | 30 | 12 | 5 | 13 | 42 | 45 | −3 | 29 | |
| 12 | Metalul Bocșa | 30 | 13 | 3 | 14 | 40 | 50 | −10 | 29 | |
| 13 | Minerul Ghelar | 30 | 14 | 1 | 15 | 32 | 48 | −16 | 29 | |
| 14 | Minerul Vulcan | 30 | 12 | 4 | 14 | 35 | 43 | −8 | 28 | |
| 15 | IM Orăștie (R) | 30 | 12 | 3 | 15 | 34 | 39 | −5 | 27 | Relegation to County Championship |
| 16 | Nera Bozovici (R) | 30 | 11 | 2 | 17 | 30 | 53 | −23 | 24 | Relegation to County Championship |

Source: romaniansoccer.ro
Rules for classification: 1) points; 2) goal difference; 3) number of goals scored.
(C) Champions; (P) Promoted; (R) Relegated

=== Seria IX ===
| Pos | Team | Pld | W | D | L | GF | GA | GD | Pts | Promotion or relegation |
|---|---|---|---|---|---|---|---|---|---|---|
| 1 | Înfrățirea Oradea (C, P) | 30 | 19 | 6 | 5 | 57 | 19 | +38 | 44 | Promotion to Divizia B |
| 2 | Strungul Arad | 30 | 19 | 3 | 8 | 51 | 22 | +29 | 41 | |
| 3 | Constructorul Arad | 30 | 17 | 3 | 10 | 41 | 21 | +20 | 37 | |
| 4 | Rapid Arad | 30 | 16 | 4 | 10 | 47 | 28 | +19 | 36 | |
| 5 | Someșul Satu Mare | 30 | 15 | 3 | 12 | 43 | 38 | +5 | 33 | |
| 6 | Voința Oradea | 30 | 14 | 3 | 13 | 42 | 32 | +10 | 31 | |
| 7 | Bihoreana Marghita | 30 | 13 | 5 | 12 | 54 | 50 | +4 | 31 | |
| 8 | Minerul Ilba-Seini | 30 | 12 | 6 | 12 | 38 | 31 | +7 | 30 | |
| 9 | Oașul Negrești | 30 | 14 | 2 | 14 | 41 | 40 | +1 | 30 | |
| 10 | Minerul Șuncuiuș | 30 | 12 | 3 | 15 | 41 | 43 | −2 | 27 | |
| 11 | Minerul Bihor | 30 | 12 | 3 | 15 | 38 | 58 | −20 | 27 | |
| 12 | Rapid Jibou | 30 | 10 | 5 | 15 | 33 | 41 | −8 | 25 | |
| 13 | Recolta Salonta | 30 | 10 | 5 | 15 | 28 | 41 | −13 | 25 | |
| 14 | Oțelul Bihor | 30 | 8 | 7 | 15 | 29 | 54 | −25 | 23 | |
| 15 | Gloria Arad (R) | 30 | 7 | 7 | 16 | 35 | 61 | −26 | 21 | Relegation to County Championship |
| 16 | Voința Carei (R) | 30 | 6 | 7 | 17 | 23 | 62 | −39 | 19 | Relegation to County Championship |

Source: romaniansoccer.ro
Rules for classification: 1) points; 2) goal difference; 3) number of goals scored.
(C) Champions; (P) Promoted; (R) Relegated

=== Seria X ===
| Pos | Team | Pld | W | D | L | GF | GA | GD | Pts | Promotion or relegation |
|---|---|---|---|---|---|---|---|---|---|---|
| 1 | Minerul Cavnic (C, P) | 30 | 18 | 5 | 7 | 64 | 21 | +43 | 41 | Promotion to Divizia B |
| 2 | Minerul Baia Sprie | 30 | 17 | 2 | 11 | 62 | 35 | +27 | 36 | |
| 3 | Minerul Băița | 30 | 16 | 4 | 10 | 44 | 31 | +13 | 36 | |
| 4 | Lăpușul Târgu Lăpuș | 30 | 17 | 2 | 11 | 45 | 42 | +3 | 36 | |
| 5 | Minerul Rodna | 30 | 16 | 2 | 12 | 67 | 40 | +27 | 34 | |
| 6 | Minerul Băiuț | 30 | 15 | 2 | 13 | 49 | 34 | +15 | 32 | |
| 7 | Unirea Dej | 30 | 14 | 4 | 12 | 51 | 47 | +4 | 32 | |
| 8 | Oțelul Reghin | 30 | 14 | 3 | 13 | 36 | 38 | −2 | 31 | |
| 9 | Cuprom Baia Mare | 30 | 12 | 5 | 13 | 40 | 44 | −4 | 29 | |
| 10 | Bradul Vișeu de Sus | 30 | 12 | 5 | 13 | 39 | 48 | −9 | 29 | |
| 11 | CM Cluj-Napoca | 30 | 12 | 5 | 13 | 44 | 55 | −11 | 29 | |
| 12 | Hebe Sângeorz-Băi | 30 | 13 | 2 | 15 | 40 | 50 | −10 | 28 | |
| 13 | Foresta Bistrița | 30 | 11 | 4 | 15 | 36 | 43 | −7 | 26 | |
| 14 | Tehnofrig Cluj-Napoca | 30 | 11 | 4 | 15 | 32 | 45 | −13 | 26 | |
| 15 | CIL Gherla (R) | 30 | 12 | 2 | 16 | 37 | 64 | −27 | 26 | Relegation to County Championship |
| 16 | Dermata Cluj-Napoca (R) | 30 | 3 | 3 | 24 | 26 | 75 | −49 | 9 | Relegation to County Championship |

Source: romaniansoccer.ro
Rules for classification: 1) points; 2) goal difference; 3) number of goals scored.
(C) Champions; (P) Promoted; (R) Relegated

=== Seria XI ===
| Pos | Team | Pld | W | D | L | GF | GA | GD | Pts | Promotion or relegation |
|---|---|---|---|---|---|---|---|---|---|---|
| 1 | Poiana Câmpina (C, P) | 30 | 22 | 4 | 4 | 61 | 18 | +43 | 48 | Promotion to Divizia B |
| 2 | CSU Brașov | 30 | 18 | 6 | 6 | 51 | 28 | +23 | 42 | |
| 3 | Viitorul Gheorgheni | 30 | 14 | 3 | 13 | 40 | 31 | +9 | 31 | |
| 4 | Torpedo Zărnești | 30 | 12 | 7 | 11 | 35 | 31 | +4 | 31 | |
| 5 | Progresul Odorheiu Secuiesc | 30 | 13 | 4 | 13 | 45 | 40 | +5 | 30 | |
| 6 | Caraimanul Bușteni | 30 | 14 | 2 | 14 | 41 | 40 | +1 | 30 | |
| 7 | Precizia Săcele | 30 | 10 | 10 | 10 | 26 | 29 | −3 | 30 | |
| 8 | Minerul Bălan | 30 | 12 | 6 | 12 | 35 | 40 | −5 | 30 | |
| 9 | IUPS Miercurea Ciuc | 30 | 12 | 5 | 13 | 35 | 36 | −1 | 29 | |
| 10 | Metrom Brașov | 30 | 10 | 8 | 12 | 34 | 29 | +5 | 28 | |
| 11 | Minerul Baraolt | 30 | 12 | 4 | 14 | 38 | 42 | −4 | 28 | |
| 12 | IRA Câmpina | 30 | 11 | 6 | 13 | 29 | 43 | −14 | 28 | |
| 13 | Chimia Orașul Victoria | 30 | 11 | 5 | 14 | 30 | 32 | −2 | 27 | |
| 14 | Carpați Brașov | 30 | 10 | 7 | 13 | 24 | 27 | −3 | 27 | |
| 15 | Metalul Târgu Secuiesc (R) | 30 | 12 | 3 | 15 | 30 | 35 | −5 | 27 | Relegation to County Championship |
| 16 | CPL Sfântu Gheorghe (R) | 30 | 4 | 6 | 20 | 18 | 71 | −53 | 14 | Relegation to County Championship |

Source: romaniansoccer.ro
Rules for classification: 1) points; 2) goal difference; 3) number of goals scored.
(C) Champions; (P) Promoted; (R) Relegated

=== Seria XII ===
| Pos | Team | Pld | W | D | L | GF | GA | GD | Pts | Promotion or relegation |
|---|---|---|---|---|---|---|---|---|---|---|
| 1 | IS Câmpia Turzii (C, P) | 30 | 19 | 5 | 6 | 75 | 23 | +52 | 43 | Promotion to Divizia B |
| 2 | Metalul Aiud | 30 | 18 | 3 | 9 | 49 | 21 | +28 | 39 | |
| 3 | Carpați Mârșa | 30 | 16 | 6 | 8 | 51 | 34 | +17 | 38 | |
| 4 | Sticla Arieșul Turda | 30 | 15 | 5 | 10 | 41 | 28 | +13 | 35 | |
| 5 | Metalul Sighișoara | 30 | 13 | 5 | 12 | 46 | 39 | +7 | 31 | |
| 6 | Mureșul Luduș | 30 | 12 | 7 | 11 | 41 | 46 | −5 | 31 | |
| 7 | Inter Sibiu | 30 | 13 | 5 | 12 | 32 | 39 | −7 | 31 | |
| 8 | Textila Cisnădie | 30 | 12 | 5 | 13 | 44 | 37 | +7 | 29 | |
| 9 | Unirea Alba Iulia | 30 | 11 | 6 | 13 | 37 | 47 | −10 | 28 | |
| 10 | Metalul Copșa Mică | 30 | 11 | 6 | 13 | 37 | 56 | −19 | 28 | |
| 11 | IMIX Agnita | 30 | 9 | 8 | 13 | 31 | 40 | −9 | 26 | |
| 12 | Automecanica Mediaș | 30 | 9 | 8 | 13 | 25 | 38 | −13 | 26 | |
| 13 | Utilajul Făgăraș | 30 | 10 | 5 | 15 | 38 | 48 | −10 | 25 | |
| 14 | IPA Sibiu | 30 | 10 | 5 | 15 | 29 | 46 | −17 | 25 | |
| 15 | Constructorul Alba Iulia (R) | 30 | 10 | 4 | 16 | 29 | 41 | −12 | 24 | Relegation to County Championship |
| 16 | Soda Ocna Mureș (R) | 30 | 7 | 7 | 16 | 27 | 49 | −22 | 21 | Relegation to County Championship |

Source: romaniansoccer.ro
Rules for classification: 1) points; 2) goal difference; 3) number of goals scored.
(C) Champions; (P) Promoted; (R) Relegated

== See also ==
- 1977–78 Divizia A
- 1977–78 Divizia B
- 1977–78 County Championship
