= Abel Valdez =

Argentine footballer

Personal information
- Full name: Abel Andres Nuñez Valdez
- Date of birth: November 25, 1987 (age 38)
- Place of birth: Formosa, Argentina
- Height: 1.83 m (6 ft 0 in)
- Position: Defender

Youth career
- Defensa y Justicia

Senior career*
Years	Team	Apps	(Gls)
2006	Club Fernando de la Mora	17	(1)
2007–2008	Club 12 de Octubre	1	(0)
2008–2009	Delta Tulcea	18	(0)
2009–2011	Astra Ploieşti	2	(0)
2010–2011	→ Astra II Giurgiu (loan)	7	(0)
- * Club domestic league appearances and goals

Abel Andres Nuñez Valdez (born November 25, 1987) is an Argentine former professional footballer who played as a defender.

Valdez played in the Paraguayan top division with Club Fernando de la Mora in 2006, scoring a goal in Mora's 4–3 victory over 3 de Febrero. After Mora's relegation, Valdez transferred to Club 12 de Octubre.

Valdez signed with Romania's Astra Ploieşti for three years in 2009. He debuted as a substitute on 21 August 2009. He caught swine flu while with Astra in November 2009 and finished his career on loan to the reserves.
