= Independent Engineer Battalion "Codru" =

Special forces unit in Moldova

- Batalionul de geniu „Codru”
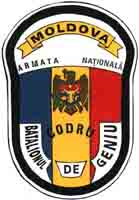
- The shoulder patch of the battalion.
- Active: 16 October 1992-Present
- Country: Moldova
- Branch: Moldovan Ground Forces
- Type: Engineering
- Garrison/HQ: Negrești
- Battle honours: Order of Allegiance to the Fatherland, 1st Class

The Independent Engineer Battalion "Codru" (Romanian: Batalionul de geniu „Codru”) is the engineering formation of the Moldovan National Army, based in the village of Negrești, Strășeni District. Soldiers of the battalion soldiers have been on international missions, including the Kosovo Force mission in Kosovo.

== History ==
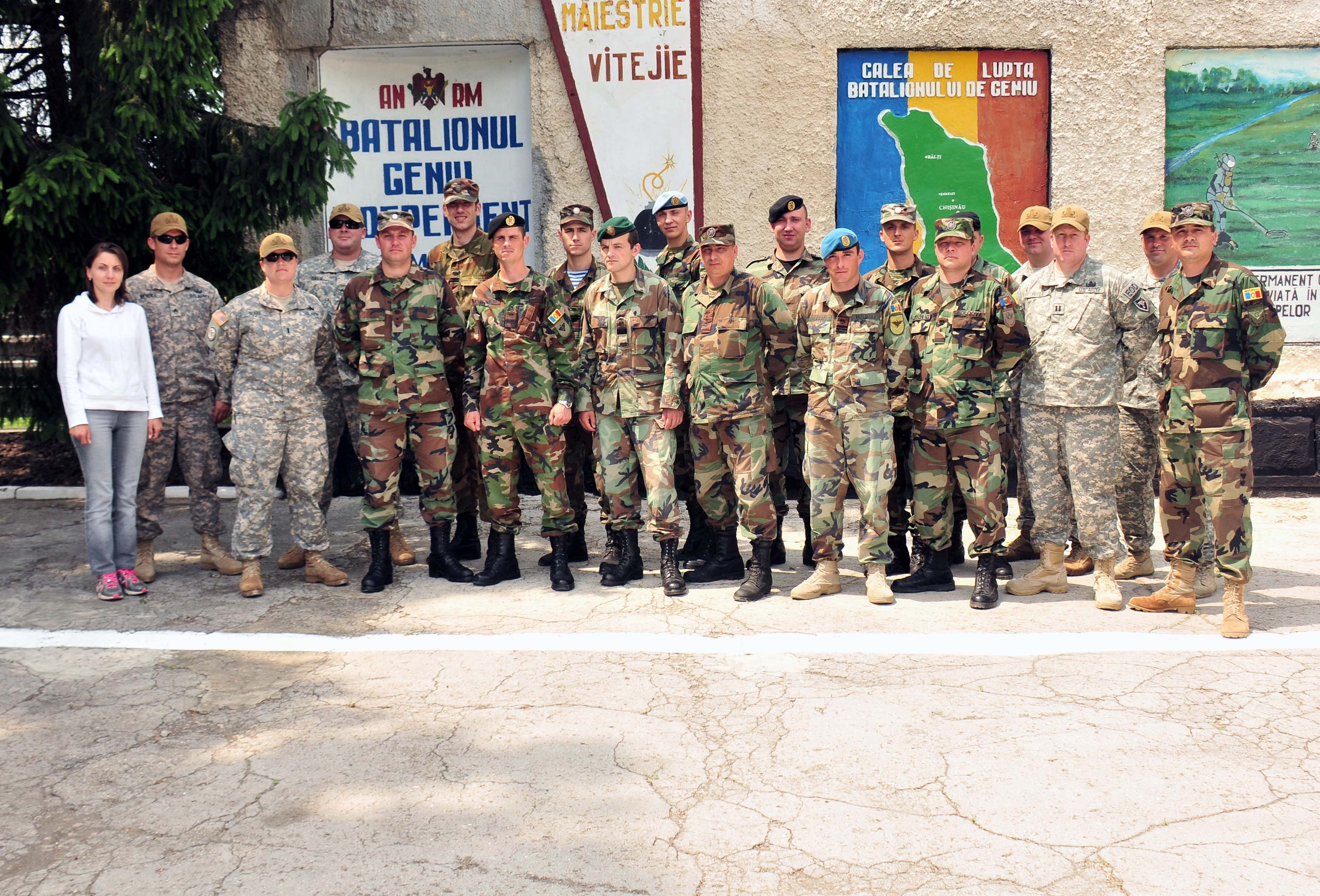
Moldovan engineers with soldiers of the North Carolina National Guard.

The battalion was formed on 16 October 1992. It was created to assist the regular army during the Transnistrian War in the early 90's. It was the first unit of the National Army to be decorated by presidential decree with the state order "Faith of the Fatherland", class I. Members of the unit deployed to Iraq both in 2003 and 2008. The Moldovan Ministry of Defense reported that in 2013, the battalion were called 133 times to safely dispose over 1,800 pieces of ordnance. Since January 2014, it has safely removed 192 pieces of unexploded ordnance.

== Mine clearance operations ==
- In March 2014, in the town Ungheni, a construction crew unearthed one of the largest caches of unexploded anti-tank, anti-personnel and artillery shells ever found dating back to the Nazi occupation of Moldova. The city leadership immediately asked for assistance from the battalion, members of which were deployed to the location and safely removed and destroyed over 32 pieces of German munitions. This earned it praise from Mayor Alexandru Ambros.
- In later 2018, sixty-six bombs were found and neutralized in the Hîncești District.
- In April 2020, the battalion underwent a demining mission in Bălțați village where over 30 projectiles were liquidated by the engineers of the battalion after two children were seriously injured as a result of an explosion.

== See also ==
- Mine clearance organization
