= Vasile Copil =

Romanian footballer (1936–2018)

Personal information
- Date of birth: 29 February 1936
- Place of birth: Câmpia Turzii, Romania
- Date of death: 22 June 2018 (aged 82)
- Position: Midfielder

Youth career
- 1950–1953: Universitatea Cluj

Senior career*
Years	Team	Apps	(Gls)
1953	Universitatea Cluj	5	(0)
1954	Voința București		
1954	Progresul CPCS București		
1955	Progresul București		
1956–1962	Rapid București		
1962	IS Câmpia Turzii		
1963	Progresul București	4	(0)

International career
1955–1956	Romania	3	(0)

Managerial career
- 1965–1970: ȘN Oltenița
- 1970–1971: Delta Tulcea
- 1971–1972: ȘN Oltenița
- 1972–1974: Delta Tulcea
- 1974–1977: Rapid București (assistant)
- 1977–1978: Muscelul Câmpulung
- 1978–1980: Autobuzul București
- 1980–1983: Gaz Metan Mediaș
- 1983–1984: Ceahlăul Piatra Neamț
- * Club domestic league appearances and goals

Vasile Copil (29 February 1936 – 22 June 2018) was a Romanian footballer who played as a midfielder and also a manager.

== International career ==
Vasile Copil played three friendly matches for Romania, making his debut on 28 September 1955 under coach Gheorghe Popescu I in a 1–0 victory against Belgium. His following two games were a 1–1 against Bulgaria and a 2–0 loss against Sweden.

== Honours ==
=== Manager ===
ȘN Oltenița

- Divizia C: 1969–70

Delta Tulcea

- Divizia C: 1970–71, 1971–72
