= Codruț =

Codruț is a Romanian male given name, and surname.

== People with the given name ==
- Codruț Cioranu (born 1991), Romanian footballer
- Codruț Lircă (born 1989), Romanian footballer
- Codruț Șereș (born 1969), Romanian engineer and politician

== People with the surname ==
- Mariana Codruț (born 1956), Romanian poet, writer, and journalist
