= Florin Pătrașcu =

Romanian footballer

Personal information
- Date of birth: 12 April 1986 (age 40)
- Place of birth: Brașov, Romania
- Height: 1.84 m (6 ft 0 in)
- Position: Defender

Youth career
- Tractorul Brașov
- ȘF "Nicolae Dobrin"

Senior career*
Years	Team	Apps	(Gls)
2004–2007	Bihor Oradea	46	(1)
2007–2010	Farul Constanța	63	(0)
2009–2010	→ Delta Tulcea (loan)	11	(0)
2010–2012	Astra Ploiești	21	(3)
2010	→ Astra II Giurgiu	1	(0)
2011	→ Politehnica Iași (loan)	12	(1)
2012	Turnu Severin	9	(0)
2013	Mioveni	4	(0)
2013–2014	Universitatea Craiova	29	(0)
2014	Săgeata Năvodari	11	(1)
2015–2017	Farul Constanţa	65	(3)
Total		272	(9)
- * Club domestic league appearances and goals as of 2 October 2018

Florin Pătrașcu (born 12 April 1986) is a Romanian former football defender. He made his debut at senior level for FC Bihor Oradea in 2004 and in the Liga I he debuted in 2007 for Farul Constanța. In his career Pătrașcu played also for teams such as: Astra Ploiești, Politehnica Iași and Universitatea Craiova, among others.
