= Delta Municipal Stadium =

Stadium in Tulcea, Romania

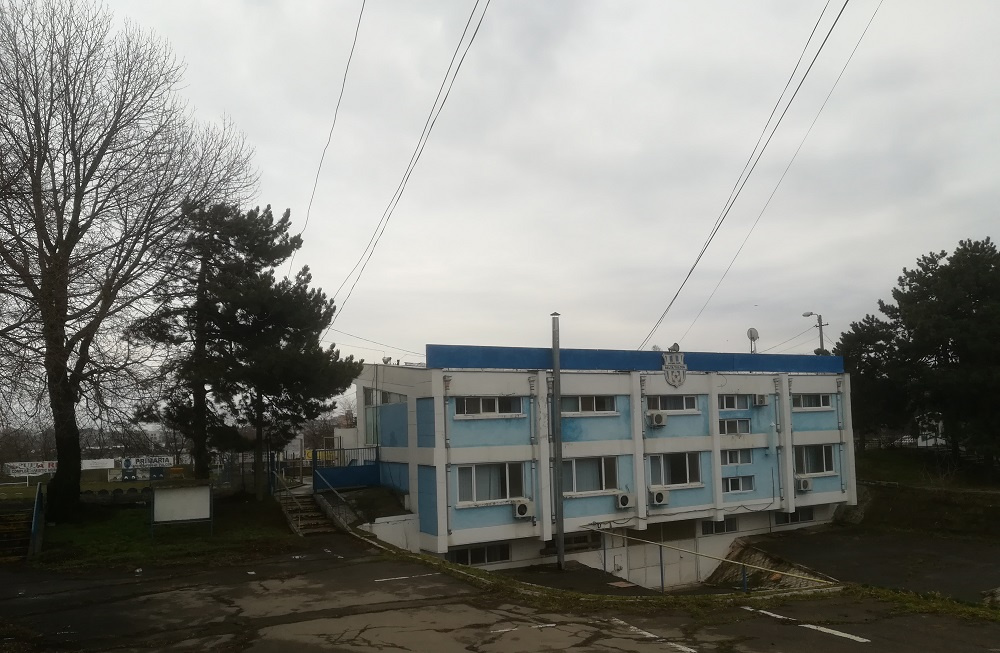
- Interactive map of Delta Municipal Stadium
- Address: Str. Tineretului, nr. 2
- Location: Tulcea, Romania
- Coordinates: 45°10′57.16″N 28°46′47.30″E
- Owner: Municipality of Tulcea
- Operator: Delta Tulcea
- Capacity: 6,600 seated
- Surface: Grass

Construction
- Renovated: 2008–2009; 2014–2016 (surface)

Tenant
- Delta Tulcea (2005–present)

The Delta Municipal Stadium is a multi-use stadium in Tulcea, Romania. It is currently used mostly for football matches and is the home ground of Delta Tulcea. The stadium holds 6,600 people. Shortly after the death of Gheorghe Iamandi, a former played of Delta, the stadium was renamed "Delta – Gheorghe Iamandi" in his honor.
