= OAE =

OAE could refer to:

- Oceanic Anoxic event, in which the Earth's oceans become completely depleted of oxygen below the surface levels.
- Orchestra of the Age of Enlightenment, a British period instrument orchestra.
- Otoacoustic emissions, involved in testing hearing.
- Omni Air Express, United States (ICAO operator designator)
- Operation Active Endeavour
- Operation Arctic Endurance, exercise simulating the defence of Greenland against U.S. invasion
- Oddworld: Abe's Exoddus a platform game made by Oddworld Inhabitants released in 1998

== See also ==
- Oae (disambiguation)
