= Marius Oae =

Romanian footballer

Personal information
- Full name: Marius Mădălin Oae
- Date of birth: 1 September 1983 (age 43)
- Place of birth: Bucharest, Romania
- Height: 1.73 m (5 ft 8 in)
- Position: Midfielder

Youth career
- Sportul Studențesc

Senior career*
Years	Team	Apps	(Gls)
2003–2008	Sportul Studențesc	54	(1)
2008–2010	Concordia Chiajna	35	(10)
2011	Delta Tulcea	24	(0)
2013	Edenkoben	?	(?)
2014	Progresul Cernica	?	(?)
Total		113+	(11+)
- * Club domestic league appearances and goals as of 14 March 2018

Marius Mădălin Oae (born 1 September 1983) is a Romanian former professional footballer who played as a midfielder. Oae started his career at Sportul Studențesc, for which played in the Liga I, then he played for Liga II sides Concordia Chiajna and Delta Tulcea, for German lower leagues Edenkoben and ended his career in 2014 after a short period spent at Liga III side Progresul Cernica.
