= Dumitru Macri =

Romanian footballer and manager (1931–2024)

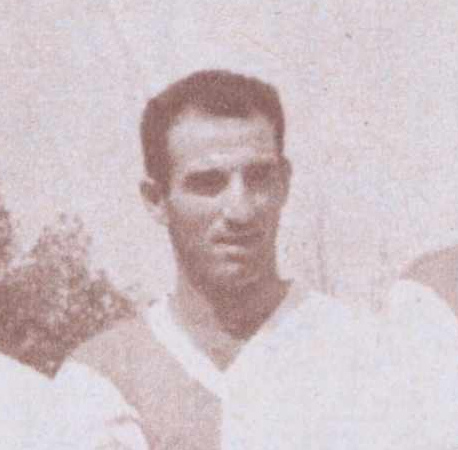
- Macri with Rapid București in 1963.

Personal information
- Date of birth: 28 April 1931
- Place of birth: Bucharest, Romania
- Date of death: 20 March 2024 (aged 92)
- Place of death: Paris, France
- Height: 1.71 m (5 ft 7 in)
- Position: Central defender

Youth career
- 1947–1949: Flacăra Roșie București

Senior career*
Years	Team	Apps	(Gls)
1950–1965	Rapid București (Note: The appearances and goals scored at the 1957 unofficial championship called Cupa Primăverii are not official, also the statistics for the 1952 and 1955 Divizia B seasons are unavailable.)	221	(1)

International career
1956–1957	Romania B	2	(0)
1959	Romania Olympic	2	(0)
1958–1962	Romania	8	(0)

Managerial career
- 1971: CFR Timișoara
- 1971–1973: RC Kouba
- 1973: Rapid București
- 1974–1975: Algeria
- 1978–1980: Viitorul Scornicești
- 1981: Romania U20 (assistant)
- 1984: Olt Scornicești
- * Club domestic league appearances and goals

Dumitru Macri (28 April 1931 – 20 March 2024) was a Romanian football player and coach.

== Club career ==
Macri was born on 28 April 1931 in Bucharest, Romania and began playing junior-level football in 1947 at Flacăra Roșie București. Afterwards he went to play at senior level for Rapid București, making his Divizia A debut on 19 March 1950 in a 0–0 draw against Știința Timișoara. In his first season the team finished in second place, losing the title to Flamura Roșie Arad due to an inferior goal average despite having the same number of points. Against the same opponent in 1954, he scored his only top-league goal with a shot from approximately 60 meters in an eventual 3–2 loss.

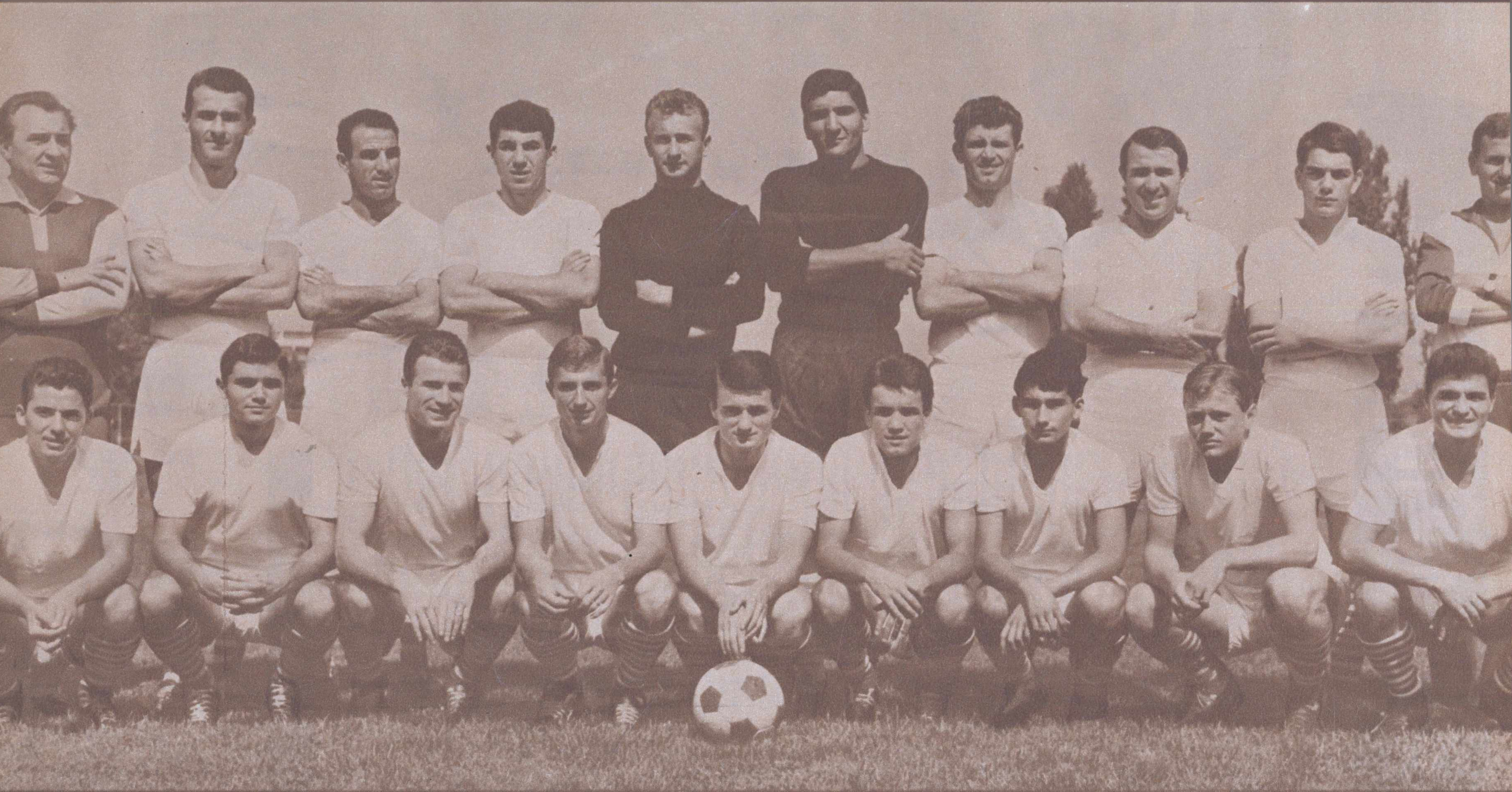
Macri (third from the left, back row) with Rapid București in 1965

Macri spent all of his career with Rapid București, totalling 15 seasons, during which he was the club's captain between 1952 and 1966. During this period he had two runner-up positions in the first league, and reaching two Cupa României finals in 1961 and 1962, both of which ended in defeat. They also won the 1957 Cupa Primăverii and the 1963–64 Balkans Cup. In 1961, Macri became the first Romanian footballer to be nominated for the Ballon d'Or. During his stay at Rapid, the team was relegated twice to Divizia B, but Macri stayed with the club each time, helping it get promoted back to the first division. He made his last Divizia A appearance on 27 June 1965 in a 2–1 victory against Crișul Oradea, having a total of 221 matches with one goal scored in the competition. During his career, Macri had offers from Bucharest rivals Dinamo and Steaua, and also from Greek club Panathinaikos but he consistently refused to leave Rapid.

== International career ==
Between 1956 and 1959, Macri made several appearances for Romania's B and Olympic teams, representing the latter during the 1960 Summer Olympics qualifiers.

Macri played eight games for Romania, making his debut under coach Augustin Botescu on 26 October 1958 in a friendly which ended with a 2–1 loss against Hungary. Following a 1–0 victory in a friendly against Turkey, a Turkish journalist nominated Macri for the 1961 Ballon d'Or. His final game for the national team took place on 1 November 1962 in a 6–0 loss to Spain in the 1964 European Nations' Cup qualifiers.

== Coaching career ==
Macri was manager at CFR Timișoara, Rapid București and Olt Scornicești in Divizia A. He also coached in Algeria, first from 1971 until 1973 at RC Kouba, then the Algerian national team between 1974 and 1975. In 1981 he was Constantin Cernăianu's assistant at Romania's under-20 national team that obtained a third place in the FIFA World Youth Championship.

== Personal life and death ==
Macri was of Greek heritage through his father, who originated from Ampelochori, a small village near Kalabaka, Greece. He left Romania in 1986, moving to France with his son, an architect, being forced to do so by Romania's communist regime which was concerned that he had relatives living outside the country.

Macri died in Paris, France, on 20 March 2024, at the age of 92.

== Honours ==
Rapid București

- Divizia A runner-up: 1950, 1963–64, 1964–65
- Divizia B: 1952, 1955
- Cupa României runner-up: 1960–61, 1961–62
- Balkans Cup: 1963–64
- Cupa Primăverii: 1957

Individual

- Ballon d'Or: 1961 (35th place)

== See also ==
- List of one-club men in association football
