= Osica de Sus =

- Commune
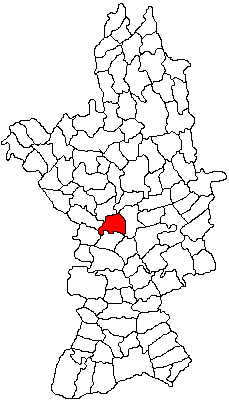
- Location in Olt County

- Location in Romania
- Coordinates: 44°15′N 24°19′E
- Country: Romania
- County: Olt
- Population (2021-12-01): 4,147
- Time zone: EET/EEST (UTC+2/+3)
- Vehicle reg.: OT

Osica de Sus is a commune in Olt County, Oltenia, Romania. It is composed of five villages: Greci, Osica de Sus, Ostrov, Tomeni and Vlăduleni.

== Natives ==
- Gheorghe Șoarece

== International relations ==
Osica de Sus is twinned with:

- Mont-Saint-Aignan, France (1991)
