= Daniel Costescu =

Romanian footballer

Personal information
- Full name: Daniel Ștefan Costescu
- Date of birth: 14 July 1976 (age 50)
- Place of birth: Câmpina, Romania
- Height: 1.80 m (5 ft 11 in)
- Position: Forward

Senior career*
Years	Team	Apps	(Gls)
1995–1996	Sterom Câmpina		
1996–1998	Poiana Câmpina	60	(15)
1998–2002	Petrolul Ploiești	113	(27)
2002–2003	Astra Ploiești	26	(10)
2003–2004	Petrolul Ploiești	36	(9)
2004–2006	Argeș Pitești	28	(2)
2006–2007	Unirea Urziceni	18	(2)
2007	Ceahlăul Piatra Neamț	8	(0)
2007	Dacia Mioveni	13	(2)
2008	Progresul București	32	(12)
2009–2010	Delta Tulcea	42	(14)
2010–2012	Baulmes	19	(8)
Total		395	(96)
- * Club domestic league appearances and goals

Daniel Ștefan Costescu (born 14 July 1976) is a Romanian former professional footballer who usually played as a striker. He scored 46 goals in 235 matches in the Romanian First Division, 47 goals in 141 matches in the Romanian Second Division and 8 goals in 19 matches in the Swiss Third Division. His first match in Divizia A (Romanian First Division) was Olimpia Satu Mare – Petrolul Ploiești 3–0 on 1 August 1998, while playing for Petrolul Ploiești. He was selected once in the Romanian Divisionary National Team (comprising players playing only in the Romanian leagues).

== Career ==
Born in Câmpina, Prahova county, Costescu began playing football with Sterom Câmpina in Divizia D (Romanian Fourth Division), and in 1996 he moved to the representative team of the same town, Poiana Câmpina, in Divizia B, the Romanian Second Division. He played 2 years for Poiana Câmpina, scoring 15 goals in 60 games, helping the team getting a top 10 finish in both seasons.

He then attracted the interest of Petrolul Ploiești in Divizia A, the best team from the Prahova county, three-time champions of Romania. At Petrolul Ploiești he established himself as an important striker in the Romanian league, scoring 27 goals between 1999 and 2002. During his time at Petrolul Ploiești he caught the eyes of Romanian greats Steaua București and Dinamo Bucuresti.

After his experience at Petrolul Ploiești, he changed the team but not the city, signing for Astra Ploiești, where he had a prolific season, scoring 10 goals in 26 games, helping them to a record-high 9th position in Divizia A.

After his short spell at Astra Ploiești, he returned to Petrolul Ploiești, where he played for another 2 years, scoring 9 goals in 36 games.

In 2004, he transferred to a settled club in Romania, FC Argeș Pitești, 2-time champions of Romania and the team that gave players like Nicolae Dobrin, Adrian Mutu, Adrian Neaga, Dănuț Coman and Paul Codrea. But, unfortunately for him, his time at FC Argeș was not one of the best, managing to score just 2 goals in 1 season.

He was transferred in 2006 by Divizia A newcomers Unirea Urziceni, who were in need of an experienced man upfront. Unirea proved to be a surprise-pack, finishing 10th in the league, and Daniel scored 2 goals for his new team.

After his season at Unirea he transferred to Ceahlăul Piatra Neamț.
