= Constantin Gărgălie =

Romanian footballer

Personal information
- Full name: Constantin Viorel Gărgălie
- Date of birth: 20 May 1979 (age 47)
- Place of birth: Romania
- Position: Right-back

Senior career*
Years	Team	Apps	(Gls)
2000–2005	Drobeta-Turnu Severin	85	(5)
2005–2006	Minerul Mehedinţi	13	(0)
2006–2008	Universitatea Craiova	31	(0)
2008	FC Caracal	15	(0)
2008–2009	Drobeta-Turnu Severin	5	(0)
- * Club domestic league appearances and goals

Constantin Viorel Gărgălie (born 20 May 1979) is a Romanian former professional footballer who played as a right-back.
