= Muller (footballer, born 1986) =

Brazilian footballer

Personal information
- Full name: Muller Santos da Silva
- Date of birth: 11 March 1986 (age 40)
- Place of birth: Brazil
- Height: 1.67 m (5 ft 6 in)
- Position: Striker

Youth career
- –2004: Vitória

Senior career*
Years	Team	Apps	(Gls)
2005	Vitória		
2006	Juventus		
2006–2008	Vilnius	46	(13)
2008	ŁKS Łódź	0	(0)
2008	Mirassol		
2009	Vitória da Conquista		
2009	Bahia de Feira		
2010	Sertãozinho		
2010	Uberlândia		
2011	Taubaté		
2013	Lagarto		
2014	Comercial		
2014	Barras		
2015	Jacuipense		
2015	Ypiranga		
2016	Olímpia		
2017	Sete de Dourados		
- * Club domestic league appearances and goals

Muller Santos da Silva or simply Muller (born 11 March 1986) is a Brazilian former professional footballer who played as a striker.
