= Marius Soare =

Romanian footballer

Personal information
- Full name: Marius Adrian Soare
- Date of birth: 30 July 1987 (age 39)
- Place of birth: Constanța, Romania
- Height: 1.71 m (5 ft 7 1/2 in)
- Position: Central attacking midfielder

Team information
- Current team: FC Farul Constanța
- Number: 18

Senior career*
Years	Team	Apps	(Gls)
2004–2005	Farul Constanța	1	(0)
2005-2006	Altay Medgidia	14	(1)
2006–2007	Farul Constanța	110	(0)
2007	Delta Tulcea	7	(0)
2007–2008	Farul Constanța	?	(?)

International career^{‡}
- Romania
- * Club domestic league appearances and goals as of N/A ‡ National team caps and goals as of N/A

Marius Adrian Soare (born 30 July 1987) is a Romanian professional football player. Soare is a central attacking midfielder.
