= Vălcineț, Ocnița =

Vălcineț
- Commune
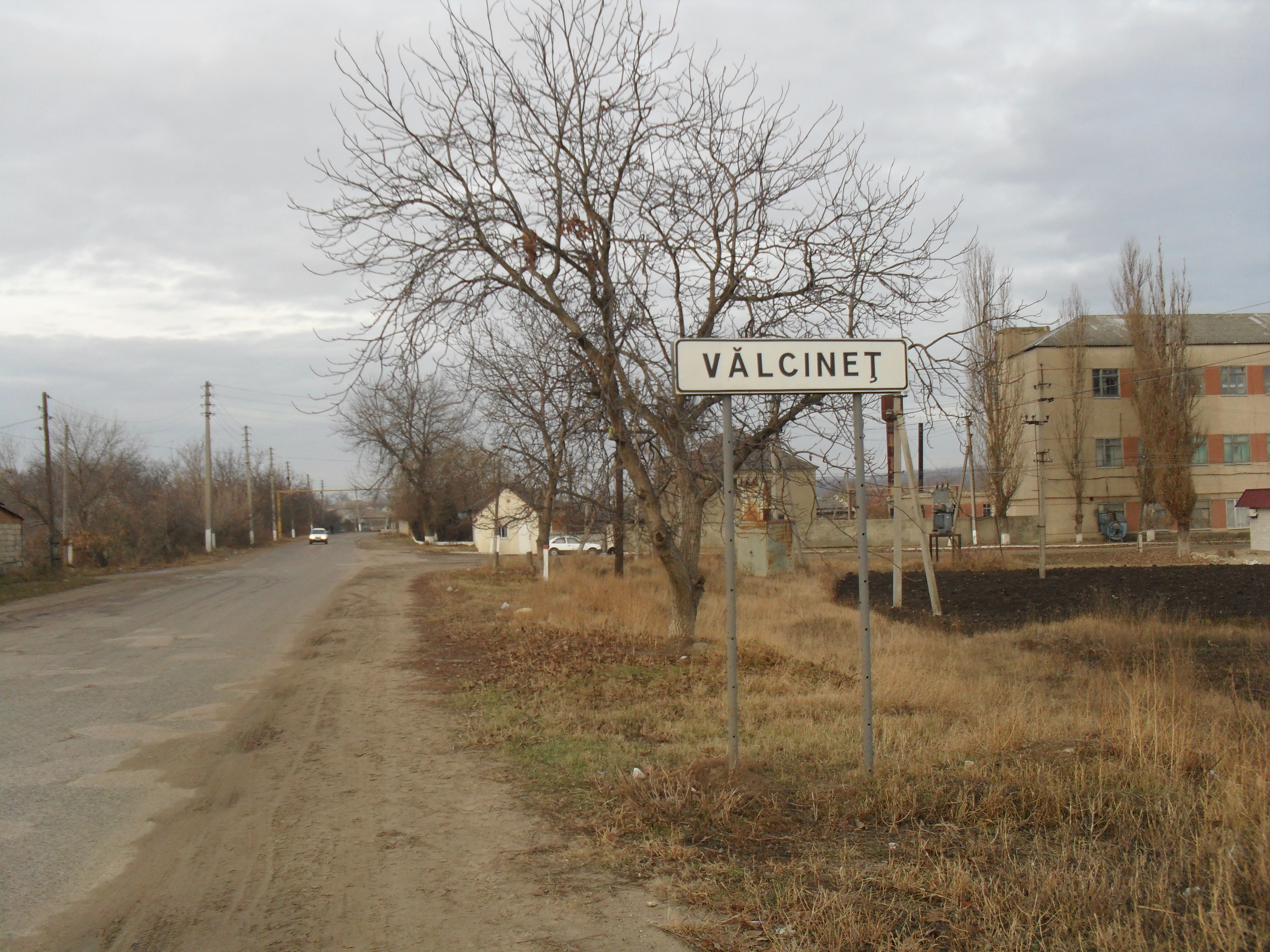
- Vălcineț entrance sign, 2011

- Location within Moldova
- Coordinates: 48.4455555556°N 27.7338888889°E
- Country: Moldova
- District: Ocnița District

Population (2014)
  - Total: 2,162
- Time zone: UTC+2 (EET)
  - Summer (DST): UTC+3 (EEST)

Vălcineț is a commune in Ocnița District, Moldova. It is composed of two villages, Codreni and Vălcineț.

It is also known as Volchinets, Volchenets, Vălcineţ, Vâlcineţi, Volchinets, and Vylchinetsi.
