= Ionuț Matei =

Romanian footballer

Personal information
- Date of birth: 2 July 1984 (age 42)
- Place of birth: Botosani, Romania
- Height: 1.82 m (6 ft 0 in)
- Position: Midfielder

Team information
- Current team: F.C. Romania

Senior career*
Years	Team	Apps	(Gls)
2003–2007	FCM Bacău	69	(1)
2007–2012	Poli Timișoara	15	(0)
2007–2008	→ FCM Reșița	15	(0)
2008–2009	→ Ceahlăul	15	(4)
2010	→ CS Otopeni	10	(2)
2010–2011	→ FC Botoșani	14	(9)
2011–2012	→ Voința Sibiu	7	(0)
2012–2014	Botoșani	16	(0)
2014	Bucovina Rădăuți		
2014–	F.C. Romania		
- * Club domestic league appearances and goals as of 20 June 2016

Ionuț Matei (born 2 July 1984 in Bacău) is a Romanian football player, who plays for F.C. Romania.
