= Ilie Codreanu =

Romanian sport shooter

Personal information
- Born: 22 October 1948 (age 77) Bucharest, Romania

Sport
- Sport: Sports shooting

Ilie Codreanu (born 22 October 1948) is a Romanian former sport shooter who competed in the 1972 Summer Olympics.
