= FC Olt Scornicești =

Association football club in Romania

- Full name: Fotbal Club Olt Scornicești
- Nicknames: Galben-Verzii (The Yellow and Greens)
- Short name: FC Olt
- Founded: 1972; 54 years ago (as Viitorul Scornicești)
- Ground: Viitorul
- Capacity: 13,500 (100 seated)
- Owner: Scornicești Town
- Chairman: Robert Gogot
- Manager: Daniel Popa
- League: Liga IV
- 2025–26: Liga IV, Olt County, 10th of 16
Home colours	Away colours

Fotbal Club Olt Scornicești (Romanian pronunciation: [olt skorniˈt͡ʃeʃtʲ]), commonly known as FC Olt Scornicești, Olt Scornicești or simply as FC Olt, is a Romanian football club based in Scornicești, Olt County, currently playing in Liga IV – Olt County.

Founded in 1972 under the name Viitorul Scornicești, the team quickly became one of the best teams from a rural area, achieving successive promotions through all divisions with political support. Their best finish was 4th place in Divizia A during the 1981–82 season.

The club represented the home village of former dictator Nicolae Ceaușescu and arguably receiving "extra help" to reach the top division and avoid relegation. After the fall of the communist regime, the club lost its main backing and was excluded from Divizia A by the Romanian Football Federation, alongside Victoria București, and struggled to stay solvent in the following years.

== History ==
FC Olt Scornicești was founded in the summer of 1972, under the name Viitorul Scornicești. The first competition the team took part in was the Olt County Championship, during the 1973–74 season. The team’s first coach was Gabi Stoicescu, a former player for Progresul București, and the squad included players such as Mircea Ciubotea, Petrescu, Radu Gheorghe, Roșca, Sevastian Cârstea, Dima, Trănțescu, Bobei, Petre Petre, Voichin, Toma, Pleșa, Chelban, Ion Vîlceanu, Stîrcu, and Lucian Martinescu. The team won the county championship and, with Costel Duță as the new head coach, it earned promotion to Divizia C after a promotion play-off against the Vâlcea County champions, Unirea Băbeni (1–1 at Băbeni and 6–1 in Slatina).

In their first third division season, Viitorul had a modest start, finishing the first half of the campaign in 15th place. Costel Duță was replaced by Constantin Rotaru, and the squad was strengthened with players such as goalkeeper Ion Anghel (from Sportul Studențesc), C. Mincu, Nucu Păun, and Gheorghe Șoarece, who would go on to become a club symbol, (all from Dinamo Slatina), as well as Lăcătușu and Mehedințu, sent from Dinamo București, along with Gheorghe Manea and Petre Manea. The season ended with the team in 6th place, five points above the relegation zone.

In the following years, the team continued to play in Series VI of Divizia C, finishing 4th in the 1975–76 season, 7th in 1976–77, and at the end of the 1977–78 campaign, it won the series and earned promotion to Divizia B. The team, coached by Dumitru Macri, included L. Martinescu, Gh. Florea, C. Pană, V. Ioniță, N. Păun, P. Petre, P. Manea, Gh. Manea, C. Mincu, Palea, Voiculeț, Gh. Șoarece, Aurel Mincu, and Stelian Badea. A famous episode from that season took place in the final round, when, needing to promote on goal difference, Viitorul defeated Electrodul Slatina 18–0. It is said that, due to a mix-up regarding the result of the other decisive match, Flacăra Moreni – ROVA Roșiori 2–1, the club president, Dumitru Dragomir, brought the players back onto the pitch from the locker room to score more goals, fearing that promotion might be compromised.

The remarkable run continued. After just one season in the second division, Viitorul earned promotion to Divizia A in the 1978–79 season. With Dumitru Macri as technical director and Dumitru Anescu as head coach, the starting lineup was: I. Anghel – C. Mincu, C. Pană, L. Martinescu, A. Mincu – S. Badea, Gh. Manea, P. Petre – P. Manea, Gh. Șoarece, Fuiorea. Other squad members included V. Predescu, Amza, Cotigă, Gh. Florea, and Voiculeț.

== Chronology of names ==
Name	Period
Viitorul Scornicești	1972–1978
FC Scornicești	1978–1980
FC Olt Scornicești	1980–1990
CS Olt 90 Scornicești	1990–1994
FC Olt Scornicești	1994–present

== Honours ==
Liga II

- Winners (1): 1978–79

Liga III

- Winners (2): 1977–78, 1990–91

Liga IV – Olt County

- Winners (3): 1973–74, 1995–96, 2002–03
- Runners-up (1): 1994–95

== Former managers ==
- (Romania) Costel Duță (1973–1974)
- (Romania) Dumitru Anescu (1978–1979)
- (Romania) Dumitru Macri (1979–1980)
- (Romania) Constantin Ardeleanu (1980–1981)
- (Romania) Florin Halagian (1981–1984)
- (Romania) Dumitru Macri (1984)
- (Romania) Traian Ionescu (1984–1985)
- (Romania) Ion Oblemenco (1985)
- (Romania) Gheorghe Constantin (1986–1987)
- (Romania) Marian Bondrea (1988–1989)
- (Romania) Cornel Dinu (1989–1990)
- (Romania) Viorel Turcu (1992–1996)
- (Romania) Victor Dinuț
- (Romania) Leonte Ianovschi
- (Romania) Constantin Stancu
