= Martin Černoch =

Czech footballer

Personal information
- Date of birth: 18 November 1977 (age 48)
- Place of birth: Nový Jičín, Czechoslovakia
- Height: 1.84 m (6 ft 1/2 in)
- Position: Striker

Youth career
- Vítkovice

Senior career*
Years	Team	Apps	(Gls)
1995–1999	Vítkovice	94	(9)
1999–2000	Humenné	15	(2)
2000–2001	Spartak Trnava	7	(0)
2001–2002	Vysočina Jihlava	13	(4)
2002–2003	Viktoria Plzeň	22	(5)
2003–2004	Kladno	28	(8)
2004–2005	Viktoria Plzeň	20	(7)
2005–2006	Slavia Prague	4	(0)
2006–2008	Politehnica Iași	45	(10)
2008	Ceahlăul Piatra Neamț	9	(1)
Total		257	(46)
- * Club domestic league appearances and goals as of 24 August 2015

Martin Černoch (born 18 November 1977) is a retired Czech football player who played as a striker.

== Honours ==
Viktoria Plzeň

- Czech Second League: 2002–03
