= André Nunes =

Brazilian footballer (born 1984)

Personal information
- Full name: André Luis Correia Diogo Nunes
- Date of birth: April 14, 1984 (age 42)
- Place of birth: Limeira, Brazil
- Height: 1.87 m (6 ft 2 in)
- Position: Striker

Senior career*
| Years | Team | Apps | (Gls) |
| 2003–2007 | Coritiba | 11 | (0) |
| 2005 | → Rio Branco Football Club (loan) | | |
| 2006 | → J. Malucelli Futebol (loan) | | |
| 2007 | → J. Malucelli Futebol (loan) | | |
| 2007 | Zagłębie Lubin | 10 | (2) |
| 2008 | Steaua București | 0 | (0) |
| 2008 | → Gloria Buzău (loan) | 9 | (1) |
| 2008–2009 | J. Malucelli Futebol | | |
| 2010 | Deportivo Anzoátegui | | |
| 2011 | Anapolina | | |
| 2011 | Arapongas | | |
| 2013 | CRAC | | |
| 2013 | Central | | |
| 2013 | Cerro Largo | 6 | (1) |
| 2014 | Rio Branco-SP | | |
- * Club domestic league appearances and goals

André Luis Correia Diogo Nunes (born 14 April 1984) is a Brazilian former professional footballer who played as a striker.

André Nunes previously played for Zagłębie Lubin in the Polish Ekstraklasa before moving to 2007–08 UEFA Champions League qualifying opponent in early 2008, Steaua București for 100,000€. He made no appearances for the Romanian side before being loaned to fellow Liga I team, Gloria Buzău.

== Honours ==
Coritiba

- Campeonato Paranaense: 2003, 2004

Zagłębie Lubin

- Polish Super Cup: 2007
