= Emil Nanu =

Romanian footballer

Personal information
- Date of birth: 17 October 1981 (age 45)
- Place of birth: Tulcea, Romania
- Height: 1.87 m (6 ft 2 in)
- Position: Striker

Youth career
- Delta Tulcea
- Turistul Pantelimon
- Dunărea Zimnicea

Senior career*
Years	Team	Apps	(Gls)
2004–2005	Dunărea Galați	25	(2)
2005–2007	Delta Tulcea	31	(19)
2007–2009	Farul Constanța	29	(2)
2008	Delta Tulcea	16	(3)
2009–2011	Delta Tulcea	38	(7)
2011–2012	Săgeata Năvodari	14	(0)
2012–2013	Delta Tulcea	15	(3)
2013–2014	Unirea Slobozia	27	(8)
2014–2015	Delta Dobrogea Tulcea		
2015–2017	Pescărușul Sarichioi		
Total		195	(44)
- * Club domestic league appearances and goals as of 17 July 2018

Emil Nanu (born 17 October 1981) is a Romanian former professional footballer.
