= Fabian Teușan =

Romanian footballer

Personal information
- Full name: Fabian Vasile Teușan
- Date of birth: 31 October 1988 (age 37)
- Place of birth: Sibiu, Romania
- Position: Defender

Team information
- Current team: 1. SVG Gumpoldskirchen
- Number: 14

Senior career*
| Years | Team | Apps | (Gls) |
| 2005–2006 | Inter Star Sibiu | - | (-) |
| 2006–2007 | Jiul Petroşani | 12 | (0) |
| 2007–2009 | Politehnica Timişoara | 0 | (0) |
| 2007 | → FCM Reșița (loan) | 2 | (0) |
| 2008 | → CS Buftea (loan) | 21 | (0) |
| 2009 | → Gloria Buzău (loan) | 16 | (0) |
| 2009–2012 | Universitatea Cluj | 13 | (0) |
| 2011 | → Unirea Urziceni (loan) | 16 | (0) |
| 2012–2013 | Korneuburg | | |
| 2014 | Großklein | | |
| 2014 | 1980 Wien | | |
| 2015– | 1. SVG Gumpoldskirchen | | |

International career
| 2008– | Romania U21 | 1 | (0) |
- * Club domestic league appearances and goals as of 20 June 2016

Fabian Vasile Teușan (born 31 October 1988) is a Romanian football player, currently playing for 1. SVG Gumpoldskirchen.
