= Marx Santos =

Brazilian footballer

Personal information
- Full name: Marx Freud Santos Ferraz
- Date of birth: May 9, 1988 (age 38)
- Place of birth: Goiânia, Brazil
- Height: 1.93 m (6 ft 4 in)
- Position: Defender

Team information
- Current team: Caldense

Youth career
- –2007: Palmeiras

Senior career*
Years	Team	Apps	(Gls)
2007	Palmeiras Youth		
2007–2008	SønderjyskE		
2008	São Carlos		
2009	Inhumas		
2009–2010	Funorte		
2010	→Morrinhos (loan)		
2010	Vila Nova	6	(0)
2011	Ituano	8	(0)
2012	América (RN)		
2012	Boa Esporte	2	(0)
2012–2013	Ituano		
2013	Santa Cruz	9	(0)
2013–2014	Morrinhos		
2014	Guarani (MG)	6	(0)
2014	Rio Verde		
2014–2015	Guarani (MG)	8	(0)
2015–2016	Aparecidense		
2016–	Caldense		
- * Club domestic league appearances and goals as of 15 February 2016

Marx Freud Santos Ferraz (born 9 May 1988) is a Brazilian football player who currently plays for Caldense as a defender.
