= Negrești, Strășeni =

Negrești
- Village
- Location within Moldova
- Coordinates: 47.1797222222°N 28.6227777778°E
- Country: Moldova
- District: Strășeni District

Government
  - Mayor: Shirliu Alexandru (PDM)

Population (2014 census)
  - Total: 1,306
- Time zone: UTC+2 (EET)
  - Summer (DST): UTC+3 (EEST)

Negrești is a village in Strășeni District, Moldova.
