= Mircea Oltean =

Romanian footballer

Personal information
- Full name: Mircea Teodor Oltean
- Date of birth: 8 January 1982 (age 44)
- Place of birth: Târgu Mureş, Romania
- Height: 1.88 m (6 ft 2 in)
- Position: Goalkeeper

Senior career*
Years	Team	Apps	(Gls)
2001–2002	Dinamo București	0	(0)
2002–2003	Poli AEK Timişoara	0	(0)
2003–2005	Universitatea Cluj	40	(0)
2005–2007	Unirea Urziceni	25	(0)
2007	Dacia Mioveni	1	(0)
2008	Universitatea Cluj	0	(0)
2008–2009	Târgu Mureş	0	(0)
2009–2010	Arieșul Turda	14	(0)
2010–2011	ALRO Slatina	1	(0)
2011–2013	Otopeni	12	(0)
2013–2014	SC Bacău	9	(0)
Total		92	(0)
- * Club domestic league appearances and goals

Mircea Teodor Oltean (born 8 January 1982) is a Romanian former footballer, who played as a goalkeeper.
