= Codrescu =

Codrescu is a Romanian surname. Notable people with the surname include:

- Andrei Codrescu (born 1946), Romanian-born American poet, novelist, essayist, screenwriter, and commentator
- Constantin Codrescu (1931–2022), Romanian actor
