= Ștefan Ciobanu (footballer) =

Romanian footballer

Personal information
- Date of birth: 2 May 1979 (age 47)
- Place of birth: Constanța, Romania
- Height: 1.83 m (6 ft 0 in)
- Position: Striker

Team information
- Current team: Gloria Albești

Youth career
- Farul Constanța

Senior career*
Years	Team	Apps	(Gls)
1998–1999	Farul Constanța	3	(0)
1999–2000	Hondor Agigea	34	(17)
2000	Metalul Plopeni	9	(1)
2001	Conpet Ploiești		
2002–2003	Electrica Constanța		
2003–2004	Laminorul Roman		
2004–2005	Altay Constanța	11	(7)
2005–2006	Dinamo II București	1	(0)
2006–2007	Delta Tulcea	34	(17)
2007	Farul Constanța	4	(1)
2008–2009	Astra Ploiești	28	(10)
2009–2010	Săgeata Stejaru	24	(8)
2010	Delta Tulcea	14	(9)
2011	Farul Constanța	23	(6)
2012–2013	Ștefănești		
2013	Granitul Babadag		
2013–2017	Pescărușul Sarichioi		
2017–2018	Medgidia		
2018–2020	Gloria Albești		
Total		185	(77)
- * Club domestic league appearances and goals as of 24 April 2020

Ștefan Ciobanu (born 2 May 1979) is a Romanian professional footballer who plays as a striker for Liga IV side Gloria Albești. In his career Ciobanu played for teams such as Farul Constanța, Delta Tulcea, Astra Ploiești or Săgeata Stejaru, among others.

== Honours ==
Hondor Agigea

- Divizia C: Winner (1) 1999–2000

Laminorul Roman

- Divizia C: Winner (1) 2003–04

Delta Tulcea

- Liga II: Winner (1) 2006–07

Astra Ploiești

- Liga III: Winner (1) 2007–08

Pescărușul Sarichioi

- Liga IV – Tulcea County: Winner (1) 2016–17
- Cupa României – Tulcea County: Winner (1) 2016–17

Medgidia

- Liga IV – Constanța County: Winner (1) 2017–18
