= FC Delta Tulcea =

Romanian football club

Delta Tulcea
- Full name: Fotbal Club Delta Tulcea
- Nicknames: Tulcenii (The Tulcea People)
- Founded: 1950; 75 years ago as Stuful Tulcea; 2005; 20 years ago as Delta Tulcea; 2013; 12 years ago as Delta Dobrogea Tulcea; 2021; 4 years ago as Delta Tulcea
- Ground: Delta
- Capacity: 6,600
- Owner: Tulcea County Council
- Chairman: Liviu Mohonea
- League: not active at senior level
- 2023–24: Liga IV, Tulcea County, 9th of 13
Home colours	Away colours

Fotbal Club Delta Tulcea, commonly known as Delta Tulcea, is a football club from Tulcea, Romania, originally founded in 1973, then refounded in 2005, 2013, and 2021. The club did not enroll in the 2024/25 Liga IV, and last played in the 2023–24 Liga IV, finishing 9th.

== History ==
Football began to take root in Tulcea in the early decades of the twentieth century. During this period, numerous matches were played between teams from Tulcea, Sulina, Chilia Nouă, Brăila, and Galați. The outbreak of the Second World War significantly disrupted football activity, but after the conflict ended, the sport experienced a revival in the region through the formation of new clubs, one of them being Stuful Tulcea.

The team was associated with the Unitatea de Valorificare a Stufului (lit. 'Reed Exploitation Unit'), an important enterprise operating in the Danube Delta region. Notable players from that era included Ică Hădărian, Nicu Ștefan, Alexandru Cuculaș, Filon Anghel, P. Olaru, Dincă, Suliman, Sukri, Drăgănescu, Milea, the Cavalgiu brothers, Gheorghe Zuca, Paul Ciupercă, Valeriu Balaban, Manu, and Wolf.

In the 1965–66 season, Stuful Tulcea won the Dobrogea Regional Championship and secured promotion to Divizia C after a 6–1 aggregate victory in a play-off against Celuloza Călărași, the champions of the Bucharest Region. The team, coached by Ică Hădărian, included players such as Smith, Uță, Zezonov, C. Zaiț, Teodorescu, D. Nicolae, Strâmbeanu, Peceriță, Paul Ciupercă, Rifat, Mahera, Cavalgiu I, Chihodaru, and Hofman.

In their debut season in Divizia C, coached by G. Georgescu, Stuful Tulcea competed in the South Series and finished in 12th place. In 1968, the club adopted the name Delta Tulcea, embracing an identity closely tied to the region’s natural symbol, the Danube Delta. Under this name, the team became a key figure in Tulcea’s football scene for decades to come.

In the following seasons, Delta Tulcea finished 7th in Series II of the 1968–69 Divizia C campaign, then climbed to 3rd place in Series III in 1969–70. The 1970–71 season marked a breakthrough, as Delta won Series III and qualified for the promotion play-off to Divizia B. However, the team finished last in Group I of the play-off tournament held in București, behind Chimia Râmnicu Vâlcea, Metalul Plopeni, and Chimia Suceava.

Delta Tulcea won Series III of Divizia C in the 1971–72 season and qualified for the promotion play-off in București, where they convincingly defeated ITA Pașcani (10-1) and narrowly beat Petrolul Moinești (3-2), securing promotion to Divizia B. Coached by Paul Niculescu, the team included C. Zaiț (cpt.), Gh. Florea, I. Căpitanu, Gh. Breazu, D. Schmidt, C. Enache, I. Răuț, M. Stoichițoiu, D. Onea, Gh. Pareșcura, N. Girip, M. Mușter, M. Stănăgui, and A. Manu.

In Divizia B, Delta was assigned to Series I and, coached by Vasile Copil, finished in 14th place in the 1972–73 season. Renamed Sport Club Tulcea in 1973, the team placed 10th in the 1973–74 campaign, still under Copil’s guidance. That season included a solid Cupa României run, with wins over Electroputere Craiova (2–0 after extra time) and ȘN Oltenița (3–0), before a narrow 0–1 loss in the quarterfinals against Politehnica Timișoara. The lineup for that match was: Cojocaru – Jantavan, Corendea, Zaiț, Leca – Vanea, Tufan (min. 79 Florea), Răuț – Girip, Ionescu (min. 66 Stănăgui), Stoicescu.

Paul Niculescu returned as head coach for the 1974–75 season, leading the team to a 12th-place finish. In the 1975–76 season, Tulcea ended the campaign in last place and was relegated to the third division.

However, the team managed to bounce back the following year, winning Series IV of Divizia C and earning promotion to Divizia B. After this success, the club returned to the name Delta Tulcea. In the 1977–78 season, Paul Niculescu was once again appointed as head coach and guided the team to a 7th-place finish. The following seasons brought mixed results: 6th in 1978–79, 5th in 1979–80, 10th in 1980–81, 13th in 1981–82, and 14th in 1982–83, narrowly avoiding relegation by a single point. In the 1983–84 season, under the management of Dumitru Ștefan, Delta Tulcea finished 15th, tied on points with Metalul Plopeni but relegated at goal difference. The team quickly returned to the second tier, winning Series III of Divizia C in the 1984–85 season under the leadership of Vasile Copil, with a squad that included Gh. Dascălu, N. Iliușcă, Anton, Cr. Rusu, V. Bogatu, J. Pîrlogea, H. Iusein, Mașcu, V. Ingea, Gh. Stan, Istodie, D. Belea, Necșut, Moroianu, M. Șacu, D. Dinescu, Cucerencu, Petroi, and S. David.

Back in Divizia B, Delta competed in Series I and finished 10th in the 1985–86 season. In 1986, the club changed its name to Delta Dinamo Tulcea, and Vasile Copil was replaced by Ion Moldovan. The team placed 12th in the 1986–87 season and 11th in 1987–88, before being relegated at the end of the 1988–89 campaign after finishing last under Florian Dumitrescu.

In the summer of 2005, the newly promoted Dinamo Coral Tulcea ceded its place in Divizia C to the newly refounded Delta Tulcea. With Petre Marinescu as president and Constantin Gache as head coach, Delta competed in the 2005–06 season and won Series II by a wide margin, finishing twenty points ahead of CSM Râmnicu Sărat. The squad included players such as B. Pîrvu, T. Enache, Al. Dușu, D. Grigorov, C. Mocanu, Cr. Petcu, Ad. Voicu, D. Popescu, I. Bogatu, I. Filip, A. Dincă, V. Crețu, N. Crețu, D. Petre, Șt. Florea, I. Papazicu, E. Nanu, D. Gae, Cr. Pantelie, Șt. Ciobanu, M. Tilincă, and N. Jarcă.

Following promotion, many new players joined the team, including I. Olteanu, D. Pleșa, N. Niță, L. Ștefan, Cr. Coconașu, E. Câju, M. Lucan, L. Floricică, Cr. Pușcașu, C. Mișelăricu, I. Nane, Șomodean, Măjer, M. Postelnicu, Dumbravă, and D. Horovei. With this strengthened squad, Delta Tulcea won Liga II in the 2006–07 season, boosted by an impressive eight-game winning streak. However, despite this success, the club was unable to promote to Liga I due to licensing problems.

As a consequence, the Danube-side lost some of its valuable players, as well as their head coach, Constantin Gache, who left for rival Farul Constanța. Ioan Tătăran was appointed as the new head coach, and the club brought in several new players including M. Soare, Cr. Pantelie, Gigi Gorga, Stere, Al. Mățel, and a group of foreign arrivals such as E. Muratović, A. Grbović, N'Kongue and A. Valdez. However, three consecutive losses at the start of the second half led to Tătăran’s dismissal, with assistant coach Cristea Rusu taking over until the end of the campaign. Delta eventually finished the 2007–08 season in a modest 8th place.

In the summer of 2008, Constantin Gache returned to Delta and relied on several new players, including S. Constantin, Cr. Lăzărescu, I. Larie, L. Petean, Cornel Cornea, and the returning Emil Nanu, along with youngsters P. Anton and M. Curtuiuș, who joined during the winter break. Once again, the team competed for promotion, battling until the third-last round and finishing the 2008–09 season in 3rd place in Series I.

The following season, the squad was further reinforced with players such as C. Borza, C. Mărginean, A. Peteleu, Fl. Pătrașcu, Ad. Senin, D. Costescu. Despite the additions, Delta ended the 2009–10 campaign in 5th place in Series I.

The 2010–11 season proved to be Gache’s weakest. Despite signings like D. Florea, J. Lőrincz, and Răzvan Radu, Delta stood in 8th place after fewer than eight rounds, with just three wins, and was eliminated in the Round of 32 of Cupa României by Unirea Urziceni 0–1. This led to a mutual parting of ways. Cristian Dulca took over as head coach and brought in several new players, including R. Soporan, Ad. Ionescu, C. Samoilă, M. Oae, Cr. Ciubotariu, D. Sânmărtean, S. Cucu, and the returning Câju. Under Dulca’s guidance, Delta improved and finished the season in 4th place in Series I.

In the following season, Cristian Dulca resigned in March 2012 after the 16th round, following a 0–2 home defeat against Callatis Mangalia. He was replaced by Gheorghe Mulțescu, who stayed for just one week before leaving for Petrolul Ploiești. Constantin Gache then returned for a third stint as head coach and guided the team to a 3rd-place finish in Series I.

During the 2012–13 pre-season, a tragedy struck on 5 August 2012, when Nigerian player Henry Chinonso died after collapsing in a friendly match against CS Balotești. Despite the incident, the team led by Gache had a good run in the Cupa României, eliminating Unirea Casimcea (3–1), CS Afumați (3–0), and Universitatea Cluj (2–1), before losing in the Round of 16 to Rapid București (4–1). However, Gache was dismissed in January 2013 and replaced by Mihai Ciobanu, who lasted only three months before being succeeded by Erik Lincar, who guided the team to a 3rd-place finish in Series I.

In the summer of 2013, Delta withdrew from Liga II and was dissolved due to financial difficulties. Nevertheless, on 25 August 2013, the club was re-established under the name Delta Dobrogea Tulcea and entered Liga IV – Tulcea County. In the 2013–14 season, Delta Dobrogea, coached by Daniel Iftodi, finished 2nd in the regular stage, then defeated Noua Generație Măcin 2–0 in the semifinals and claimed the county title with a 2–1 victory over Granitul Babadag in the final. Tulcenii subsequently earned promotion to Liga III after a convincing 6–0 win against CFR Constanța, the Constanța County champions, in the promotion play-off held at the Municipal Stadium in Brăila.

Delta withdrew from Liga III during the 2018–19 season after a 60 points penalization due to financial problems, but continue to be active at youth level.

Former logo.

On August 27, 2022, Tulcenii announced that the club will not enroll for the 2022–23 season of Liga IV - Tulcea County due to the financial and organizational problems, but they will continue to focus on youth football.

== Honours ==
Liga II

- Winners (1): 2006–07

Liga III

- Winners (5): 1970–71, 1971–72, 1976–77, 1984–85, 2005–06
- Runners-up (1): 2015–16

Liga IV – Tulcea County

- Winners (3): 1994–95, 2004–05, 2013–14

== Notable players ==
The footballers enlisted below have had international cap(s) for their respective countries at junior and/or senior level. Players whose name is listed in bold represented their countries at junior and/or senior level on through the time's passing. Additionally, these players have also had a significant number of caps and goals accumulated throughout a certain number of seasons for the club itself as well.

- (Romania) Iulian Olteanu
- (Romania) Bogdan Pîrvu
- (Romania) Ștefan Ciobanu
- (Romania) Cosmin Mărginean
- (Romania) **Alexandru Mățel**
- (Romania) Emil Nanu
- (Romania) **Pavel Peniu**
- (Romania) **Andrei Peteleu**
- (Romania) **Nelu Stănescu**
- (Cameroon) Jean Christian N'Kongue
- (Nigeria) Henry Chinonso Ihelewere

== Former managers ==
- (Romania) Vasile Copil (1970–1971)
- (Romania) Paul Niculescu (1971–1972)
- (Romania) Vasile Copil (1972–1974)
- (Romania) Ion Moldovan (1986–1987)
- (Romania) Constantin Gache (2005–2007)
- (Romania) Ioan Tătăran (2007–2008)
- (Romania) Cristea Rusu (2008)
- (Romania) Constantin Gache (2008–2010)
- (Romania) Cristian Dulca (2010–2012)
- (Romania) Gheorghe Mulțescu (2012)
- (Romania) Erik Lincar (2013)
- (Romania) Gheorghe Iamandi (2011–2013)
- (Romania) Cosmin Mărginean (2013–2014)
- (Romania) Daniel Iftodi (2014–2015)
- (Romania) Tibor Selymes (2015–2016)
