= SpVgg Edenkoben =

German football club

- Full name: Spielvereinigung 1920 Edenkoben e.V.
- Founded: 20 April 1920
- Ground: Weinstraßenstadion
- Capacity: 8,000
- Chairman: Ernst Kunz
- Manager: Rafael Stasiak
- League: B-Klasse (X)
- 2015–16: A-Klasse Mittelhardt (IX), 14th (relegated)
Home colours	Away colours

The SpVgg Edenkoben, formerly the SV Edenkoben, is a German association football club from the town of Edenkoben, Rhineland-Palatinate.

The club's greatest success came in 1988–89 when it won the tier-three Oberliga Südwest and unsuccessfully took part in the promotion round to the 2. Fußball-Bundesliga. The club became a founding member of the new Regionalliga West/Südwest in 1994 but was relegated the season after and has since dropped into local amateur football.

The club also made two appearances in the German Cup, in 1989–90 and 1994–95.

== History ==
The origins of the club date back to 1908 when the FC Germania 08 Edenkoben was formed. This club however was short-lived, folding in 1914 with the outbreak of the First World War.

In post-war Germany a new football club was formed in Edenkoben on 20 April 1920, the FV 1920 Edenkoben. The new club soon found competition in town when a number of other clubs were formed which all eventually, on 27 January 1921, merged into the Spielvereinigung Edenkoben. The club joined local league football in the south western region of the Palatinate, winning occasional league titles and earning promotion from the C-Klasse via the B- and A-Klasse to the Bezirksliga by 1936. With the outbreak of the Second World War in 1939 the club had to withdraw its team from official competition.

With the end of the war all sports clubs were initially dissolved by the French occupation authorities and SV Edenkoben had to be reformed, like so many other clubs, which took place on 2 December 1945. SVE played once more in local competition, a situation that would not change until the early 1980s when Hans Frühbis, a local entrepreneur, took over as chairman of the club and also became the main sponsor of SV Edenkoben. His ambitious plan was to take the club to the Verbandsliga in the near future, to win promotion to the Oberliga and, within five years, a league title in the later.

After earning promotion to the tier-four Verbandsliga Südwest in 1984 the team missed out on another promotion the following year by one point when it finished second in the league behind champions FK Clausen. The year after however the club won the league and earned promotion.

SV Edenkoben's first season in the Oberliga Südwest was not a success with the team finishing second from the bottom and being relegated. Back in the Verbandsliga in 1987–88 the team took out another league title and bounced back to the Oberliga Südwest.

Returning to the Oberliga, the club proved a much stronger side, eventually taking out the league championship four points clear of second placed Eintracht Trier. As one of the eight Amateur-Oberliga champions, Edenkoben was entitled to take part in the promotion round to the 2. Fußball-Bundesliga. With two of the four Southern German Oberliga champions going up, the club came last in its group with four defeats and only one win and one draw, missing out on promotion to SpVgg Unterhaching and Hessen Kassel, as did SSV Reutlingen.

SVE remained a strong side in the Oberliga the following seasons, finishing seventh in 1990, followed by three consecutive fifth places in the league. In 1989–90 the team qualified for the first round of the German Cup for the first time, where it defeated SV Saar 05 Saarbrücken 1–0 before going out to MSV Duisburg in the second round. In 1993–94 the club was once more a contender for the league championship under coach Hans-Peter Briegel, again competing against Eintracht Trier, but this time the club from Trier came out on top and Edenkoben finished in second place, two points behind. It also, for the first and only time, won the local cup competition, the South West Cup, thereby qualifying for the German Cup for the following year. Facing SV Waldhof Mannheim in the 1994–95 edition, the club went out in the first round after a 1–2 home defeat.

Its 1993–94 league performance allowed the team to easily qualify for the newly introduced third division in the region, the Regionalliga West/Südwest. In this league however the club proved to weak, finishing second-last, nine points clear of a non-relegation rank, and dropped to the Oberliga, now the fourth tier. In the Oberliga, SVE was not competitive any more either, suffering another relegation, now to the Verbandsliga.

Back in the Verbandsliga Südwest, SV Edenkoben became a struggler, finishing in the lower half of the table in the first two seasons. In 1998–99 a sixth place meant a slight improvement but, after a tenth place the following year the club decided to withdraw from the league to the lower amateur leagues.

In 2004 the club was officially renamed SpVgg Edenkoben and has since fluctuated between the Bezirksklasse and the Bezirksliga. From 2014 to 2016 it played in the A-Klasse Mittelhardt, the ninth tier of the German football league system but was relegated at the end of the 2015–16 season.

== Honours ==
The club's honours:

=== League ===
- Oberliga Südwest
  - Champions: 1989
  - Runners-up: 1994
- Verbandsliga Südwest
  - Champions: 1986, 1988
  - Runners-up: 1985
- Bezirksklasse Vorderpfalz-Mitte
  - Champions: 2011

=== Cup ===
- South West Cup
  - Winners: 1994

== Recent seasons ==
The recent season-by-season performance of the club:

Season	Division	Tier	Position
1999–2000	Verbandsliga Südwest	V	10th – withdrawn
2000–01			
2001–02			
2002–03			
2003–04	Kreisliga Neustadt	IX	7th
2004–05	Kreisliga Neustadt	IX	2nd ↑
2005–06	Bezirksklasse Vorderpfalz-Mitte	VIII	3rd
2006–07	Bezirksklasse Vorderpfalz-Mitte	VIII	2nd ↑
2007–08	Bezirksliga Vorderpfalz	VII	15th ↓
2008–09	Bezirksklasse Vorderpfalz-Mitte	IX	6th
2009–10	Bezirksklasse Vorderpfalz-Mitte	IX	3rd
2010–11	Bezirksklasse Vorderpfalz-Mitte	IX	1st ↑
2011–12	Bezirksliga Vorderpfalz	VIII	8th
2012–13	Bezirksliga Vorderpfalz	VIII	10th
2013–14	Bezirksliga Vorderpfalz	VIII	16th ↓
2014–15	A-Klasse Mittelhardt	IX	5th
2015–16	A-Klasse Mittelhardt	IX	14th ↓
2015–16	B-Klasse	X	

- With the introduction of the Regionalligas in 1994 and the 3. Liga in 2008 as the new third tier, below the 2. Bundesliga, all leagues below dropped one tier. In 2012 the Oberliga Südwest was renamed Oberliga Rheinland-Pfalz/Saar.

↑ Promoted	↓ Relegated
