= Codruț Lircă =

Romanian footballer

Personal information
- Full name: Codruț Ștefan Lircă
- Date of birth: 11 February 1989 (age 37)
- Place of birth: Pitești, Romania
- Height: 1.74 m (5 ft 9 in)
- Position: Midfielder

Youth career
- 1998–2004: Argeș Pitești
- 2004–2006: Ardealul Cluj-Napoca

Senior career*
Years	Team	Apps	(Gls)
2006–2007	Universitatea Cluj	1	(0)
2007–2009	Progresul București	27	(1)
2009–2012	Mioveni	34	(1)
2012–2013	Damila Măciuca	22	(2)
2013–2014	Râmnicu Vâlcea	19	(3)
2014–2015	Voluntari	11	(1)
2015–2016	SCM Pitești		
- * Club domestic league appearances and goals

Codruț Ștefan Lircă (born 11 February 1989) is a Romanian former footballer who played as a midfielder. He played for teams such as Universitatea Cluj, Progresul București, CS Mioveni or CSM Râmnicu Vâlcea, among others. First match in Liga I was for Mioveni against Concordia Chiajna.
