= 2002–03 FC Oțelul Galați season =

Oțelul Galați
2002–03 season
- Chairman: Igor Pîrvu
- Manager: Costel Orac
- Divizia A: 13th
- Cupa României: Round of 32
- Top goalscorer: League: Guriță (8); All: Guriță (9); Oprea (4); Bucătaru (3); Cornea (3); Iordache (2); Tofan (2)

In the summer of 2002, coach Marius Lăcătuş refused to extend his contract saying that he is unhappy with the current financial situation at Oțelul and left the team. Soon after, many players whose contracts were expiring also left the team. They were joined by vice-president Mihai Stoica, who signed for Steaua. President Ion Ionică appointed Costel Orac as the new manager. Later in that summer, Igor Pîrvu is named as the new president of the club.

== Competitions ==
=== Friendlies ===
17 July 2002	Oltul Sfântu Gheorghe	0–3	Oțelul Galați	Sfântu Gheorghe
		(Report)	Guriţă; Tofan; Murgoci

18 July 2002	Gloria Buzău	1–4	Oțelul Galați	Sfântu Gheorghe
10:00	?	(Report)	Toma,, Guriţă

24 July 2002	Oțelul Galați	1–0	Farul Constanţa	Galați
18:00	Guriţă 76' (pen.)	(Report)		Stadium: Oțelul; Referee: Sorin Burloiu

27 July 2002	Farul Constanţa	2–0	Oțelul Galați	Constanţa
11:00	?,	(Report)		Stadium: Farul

6 February 2003 Cyprus	FC Seoul (South Korea)	2–1	(Romania) Oțelul Galați	Larnaca
17:30	?,	(Report)	Piana

10 February 2003 Cyprus	Energiya Khabarovsk (Russia)	2–0	(Romania) Oțelul Galați	Larnaca
	?,	(Report)

12 February 2003 Cyprus	Kuban Krasnodar (Russia)	2–1	(Romania) Oțelul Galați	Larnaca
18:00	? 40', 45'	(Report)	Pelin 3'

14 February 2003 Cyprus	Fakel Voronezh (Russia)	1–0	(Romania) Oțelul Galați	Larnaca
11:00	?	(Report)

26 February 2003	CF Brăila	2–0	Oțelul Galați	Lacu Sărat, Brăila
	?,	(Report)

=== Divizia A ===
Although at the end of the season they had to compete in a playout match in order to remain in Divizia A, which they lost, Oțelul still managed to keep their place in the first league due to the merger of Divizia A team Astra Ploieşti and the newly promoted Petrolul Ploieşti, which resulted in the creation of FC Petrolul Ploieşti, thus freeing a spot.

==== League table ====
Pos	Team	Pld	W	D	L	GF	GA	GD	Pts	Qualification or relegation
11	Argeș Pitești	30	11	5	14	37	41	−4	38 (Note: ARG 3-1 BAC; BAC 2-3 ARG)	
12	Bacău	30	10	8	12	31	31	0	38	
13	Oțelul Galați	30	9	9	12	25	37	−12	36	Qualification to relegation play-offs
14	Politehnica AEK Timișoara	30	11	2	17	37	52	−15	35	Qualification to relegation play-offs
15	Sportul Studențesc București (R)	30	9	4	17	44	55	−11	31	Relegation to Divizia B

Source: LT (in Romanian)
Rules for classification: 1) points; 2) head-to-head points; 3) head-to-head goal difference; 4) head-to-head goals scored; 5) goal difference; 6) number of goals scored.
(R) Relegated

==== Results by round ====
Round	1	2	3	4	5	6	7	8	9	10	11	12	13	14	15	16	17	18	19	20	21	22	23	24	25	26	27	28	29	30
Ground	H	A	H	A	H	A	H	A	A	H	A	H	A	H	A	A	H	A	H	A	H	A	H	H	A	H	A	H	A	H
Result	W	L	W	D	W	W	D	L	L	D	L	W	L	W	L	D	D	L	W	L	D	L	D	L	D	L	L	W	W	D
Position	3	9	5	6	5	3	3	4	9	8	8	7	8	7	8	8	8	10	9	10	12	13	13	14	13	13	13	13	13	13

Source: Matches
A = Away; H = Home; W = Win; D = Draw; L = Loss

==== Results summary ====
Overall								Home						Away					
Pld	W	D	L	GF	GA	GD	Pts	W	D	L	GF	GA	GD	W	D	L	GF	GA	GD
30	9	9	12	25	37	−12	36	7	6	2	17	11	+6	2	3	10	8	26	−18

==== Matches ====
17 August 2002 Matchday 1	Oțelul Galați	2–0	FC Argeş	Galați
18:00	Oprea (yellow card) 16'; Guriţă 25'; Cornea (yellow card) 33', (goal) 41'; Toma (yellow card) 37'; Bucătaru (yellow card) 85'; Iordache (yellow card) 87'	(Report)	Radu (yellow card) 12'; Dică (yellow card) 29'; Chiriţă (yellow card) 43'	Stadium: Oțelul; Attendance: 5,000; Referee: Tiberiu Lajos

25 August 2002 Matchday 2	Rapid București	5 – 2	Oțelul Galați	Bucharest
17:00	Bădoi 46'; Măldărăşanu (yellow card) 48'; Ilyeş 62'; Bratu 67', 68'; Godfroid 74'	(Report)	Pelin (yellow card) 27'; Tănase (yellow card) 33'; Bar (yellow card) 40'; Bucătaru 78', 82'	Stadium: Giuleşti – Valentin Stănescu; Attendance: 9,000; Referee: Sorin Altmayer

31 August 2002 Matchday 3	Oțelul Galați	1–0	Gloria Bistriţa	Galați
18:00	Badea (yellow card) 26'; Pelin (yellow card) 47'; Tofan 59'	(Report)	Ceauşu (yellow card) 48' (yellow-red card) 68'; Negrean (yellow card) 74'	Stadium: Oțelul; Attendance: 5,000; Referee: Alexandru Deaconu

13 September 2002 Matchday 4	Naţional București	0–0	Oțelul Galați	Bucharest
20:00	Iacob (yellow card) 88'	(Report)	Pelin (yellow card) 51'	Stadium: Cotroceni; Attendance: 2,000; Referee: Iosif Biro

21 September 2002 Matchday 5	Oțelul Galați	2–1	UTA Arad	Galați
17:00	Tofan 50'; Iordache (yellow card) 78'; Guriţă 79'; Cornea (yellow card) 83'; Toma (yellow card) 89'; Pelin (yellow card) 90+2'	(Report)	Chiţescu (yellow card) 29' (yellow-red card) 55'; Mărginean (yellow card) 48'; Baldovin 52', (yellow card) 80'; Piţ (yellow card) 68'; Botiş (yellow card) 80'	Stadium: Oțelul; Attendance: 4,000; Referee: Alexandru Tudor

28 September 2002 Matchday 6	Farul Constanţa	0–1	Oțelul Galați	Constanţa
19:00		(Report)	Bucătaru 28', (yellow card) 64'; Bar (yellow card) 55'; Toma (yellow card) 84'	Stadium: Farul; Attendance: 4,000; Referee: Alexandru Deaconu

5 October 2002 Matchday 7	Oțelul Galați	0–0	Sportul Studenţesc	Galați
15:00		(Report)	Chihaia (yellow card) 45'; Musteață (yellow card) 56'	Stadium: Oțelul; Attendance: 4,000; Referee: Anton Heleşteanu

19 October 2002 Matchday 8	Ceahlăul Piatra Neamţ	4 – 0	Oțelul Galați	Piatra Neamţ
15:00	Purică 8'; Botez (yellow card) 35'; Botan 57' (pen.); Solomon 73', 76'; Burdujan (yellow card) 89'	(Report)	Mărginean (yellow card) 37'; Tănase (yellow card) 57'	Stadium: Ceahlăul; Attendance: 1,500; Referee: Iosif Biro

26 October 2002 Matchday 9	FC Brașov	3 – 2	Oțelul Galați	Braşov
15:00	Andraşi (yellow card) 27'; Stere (yellow card) 35', (goal) 36'; Bodea 67'; Buga 70'	(Report)	Guriţă 9'; Toma (yellow card) 15'; Iordache 29'; Oprea (yellow card) 39'; Cornea (yellow card) 46'; Tănase (yellow card) 64'; Pelin (yellow card) 84'; Badea (red card) 84'	Stadium: Silviu Ploieşteanu; Attendance: 3,500; Referee: Mugurel Vădan

2 November 2002 Matchday 10	Oțelul Galați	2–2	Poli AEK	Galați
14:00	Tănase 33', (yellow card) 66'; Oprea 53'	(Report)	Pelin 45' (o.g.); Silvăşan 85'	Stadium: Oțelul; Attendance: 12,000; Referee: Gheorghe Farcaş

9 November 2002 Matchday 11	Universitatea Craiova	2–0	Oțelul Galați	Craiova
14:00	Papură 35'; Dunăreanu (yellow card) 36'; Vochin (yellow card) 43'; Luţu 51'; Pleşan (yellow card) 79'	(Report)	Iordache (yellow card) 3'	Stadium: Ion Oblemenco; Attendance: 7,000; Referee: Sorin Altmayer

16 November 2002 Matchday 12	Oțelul Galați	2–0	Dinamo București	Galați
12:00	Guriţă 18', 80'; Tofan (yellow card) 25'; Mărginean (yellow card) 62'	(Report)	Kiriţă (yellow card) 64'; Grigorie (yellow card) 72'; Preda (yellow card) 80'	Stadium: Oțelul; Attendance: 8,000; Referee: Augustus Constantin

23 November 2002 Matchday 13	Astra Ploieşti	2–0	Oțelul Galați	Ploieşti
17:00	Mihart (yellow card) 28'; Todoran (yellow card) 30'; Irimescu 83'; Tofan 88' (o.g.)	(Report)	Oprea (yellow card) 14'; Tănase (yellow card) 53'; Borş (yellow card) 76'; Pelin (yellow card) 88'	Stadium: Astra; Attendance: 1,500; Referee: Aurelian Simion

30 November 2002 Matchday 14	Oțelul Galați	1 – 0	FCM Bacău	Galați
14:00	Cornea 83'; Tofan (yellow card) 80'; Tănase (yellow card) 90+3'	(Report)	Apostol (yellow card) 40'; Lovin (yellow card) 64'; Nivaldo (yellow card) 75'	Stadium: Oțelul; Attendance: 6,000; Referee: Alexandru Deaconu

7 December 2002 Matchday 15	Steaua București	1–0	Oțelul Galați	Bucharest
13:00	Trică 30'; Mutică (yellow card) 40'	(Report)	Borş (yellow card) 8'; Iordache (yellow card) 66' (yellow-red card) 67'	Stadium: Steaua; Attendance: 250; Referee: Alexandru Băjan

8 March 2003 Matchday 17	Oțelul Galați	0–0	Rapid București	Galați
15:00	Cornea (yellow card) 44'; Badea (yellow card) 45'; Pelin (yellow card) 50'; Tofan (yellow card) 75'	(Report)	Maftei (yellow card) 3'; Bisconti (yellow card) 36'; Perjă (yellow card) 90'	Stadium: Oțelul; Attendance: 7,000; Referee: Tiberiu Lajos

15 March 2003 Matchday 18	Gloria Bistriţa	1–0	Oțelul Galați	Bistriţa
15:30	Rus (yellow card) 45'; Sânmărtean 75'	(Report)	Toma (yellow card) 12'	Stadium: Gloria; Attendance: 2,500; Referee: Sorin Altmayer

19 March 2003 Matchday 16	FC Argeş	2–2	Oțelul Galați	Piteşti
15:30	Iordache (yellow card) 5' (yellow-red card) 32'; Şomcherechi (yellow card) 6'; Bogoi (yellow card) 35'; Tofan 38' (o.g.); Dică 82' (pen.)	(Report)	Mărginean (yellow card) 8'; Cornea (yellow card) 15'; Oprea 16' (pen.), (yellow card) 63'; Guriţă 76'	Stadium: Nicolae Dobrin; Attendance: 7,000; Referee: Florin Chivulete

22 March 2003 Matchday 19	Oțelul Galați	2–1	Naţional București	Galați
16:00	Coman 1' (o.g.); Mărginean (yellow card) 37'; Oprea 58' (pen.), (yellow card) 59'; Iliuciuc (yellow card) 90+4'	(Report)	Coman 19'; Buta (yellow card) 38'; Mitrović (yellow card) 84'	Stadium: Oțelul; Attendance: 8,000; Referee: Gheorghe Farcaş

5 April 2003 Matchday 20	UTA Arad	3–0	Oțelul Galați	Arad
17:00	Popescu 33'; Manta 54', (yellow card) 82'; Luca 70'; Varga (yellow card) 75'	(Report)	Guriţă (yellow card) 68'; Bar (yellow card) 78'	Stadium: Francisc von Neumann; Attendance: 4,500; Referee: Alexandru Deaconu

12 April 2003 Matchday 21	Oțelul Galați	2–2	Farul Constanţa	Galați
17:00	Guriţă 14'; Mărginean (yellow card) 44'; Tănase (yellow card) 63'; Badea 72'; Pelin (yellow card) 89'	(Report)	Uşurelu (yellow card) 34'; Zicu 44' (pen.); Senin 56'; Chirea (yellow card) 74'; Bălan (yellow card) 82'; Bălţoi (yellow card) 90+2'	Stadium: Oțelul; Attendance: 5,000; Referee: Alexandru Tudor

16 April 2003 Matchday 22	Sportul Studenţesc	2–0	Oțelul Galați	Bucharest
17:00	Diniţă 58'; Farmache (yellow card) 68'; Chihaia 72'	(Report)	Guriţă (yellow card) 44'; Badea (yellow card) 48'; Mărginean (yellow card) 87'	Stadium: Regie; Attendance: 1,000; Referee: Iosif Biro

19 April 2003 Matchday 23	Oțelul Galați	0–0	Ceahlăul Piatra Neamţ	Galați
17:00		(Report)	Ilie (yellow card) 28'; Botez (yellow card) 37'	Stadium: Oțelul; Attendance: 5,000; Referee: Sorin Corpodean

25 April 2003 Matchday 24	Oțelul Galați	0–2	FC Brașov	Galați
17:00	Pelin (yellow card) 44'; Tofan (yellow card) 49'	(Report)	Stere 14'; Sărmăşan (yellow card) 37'; Iorga (yellow card) 43'; Nicolae (yellow card) 50'; Constantin (yellow card) 55'; Buga (yellow card) 60'; Surdu 77'; Stan (yellow card) 82'	Stadium: Oțelul; Attendance: 8,000; Referee: Cristian Lucian Dan

3 May 2003 Matchday 25	Poli AEK	0–0	Oțelul Galați	Timișoara
18:00	Stancu (yellow card) 71'; Constantinovici (yellow card) 78'; Bătrânu (yellow card) 82'	(Report)	Guriţă (yellow card) 35'; Borş (yellow card) 38'; Tănase (yellow card) 45'	Stadium: Dan Păltinişanu; Attendance: 12,000; Referee: Sorin Corpodean

7 May 2003 Matchday 26	Oțelul Galați	0–1	Universitatea Craiova	Galați
13:00	Iordache (yellow card) 29'; Tănase (yellow card) 30'; Tofan (yellow card) 44'; Pelin (yellow card) 52'; Mărginean (yellow card) 78'	(Report)	Papură 7'; Miclea (yellow card) 72'; Gušo (yellow card) 83'	Stadium: Oțelul; Attendance: 3,500; Referee: Sorin Altmayer

10 May 2003 Matchday 27	Dinamo București	1–0	Oțelul Galați	Bucharest
20:00	Frăsineanu 18'; Kiriţă (yellow card) 58'; Grigorie (yellow card) 63'	(Report)		Stadium: Dinamo; Attendance: 8,000; Referee: Iosif Biro

17 May 2003 Matchday 28	Oțelul Galați	2–1	Astra Ploieşti	Galați
18:00	Cornea 22'; Crăciun (yellow card) 59'; Guriţă 90+2'	(Report)	Todoran 90+1'	Stadium: Oțelul; Attendance: 7,000; Referee: Cristian Balaj

24 May 2003 Matchday 29	FCM Bacău	0–1	Oțelul Galați	Bacău
18:00		(Report)	Oprea 40'; Tănase (yellow card) 59'; Mărginean (yellow card) 76'; Bar (yellow card) 90+1'; Iliuciuc (yellow card) 90+2'	Stadium: Municipal; Attendance: 5,000; Referee: Marian Salomir

28 May 2003 Matchday 30	Oțelul Galați	1–1	Steaua București	Galați
18:00	Iordache 43'; Minescu (red card) 61'; Mărginean (red card) 69'; Guriţă (yellow card) 80'; Vieira (yellow card) 90+4'	(Report)	Lung (yellow card) 39'; Răducanu (red card) 61'; Paraschiv 76'	Stadium: Oțelul; Attendance: 12,000; Referee: Sorin Corpodean

14 June 2003 Playout 1st leg	Oțelul Galați	2–1	FC Oradea	Galați
18:00	Cornea 28'; Iordache (yellow card) 36'; Guriţă 67'	(Report)	Vrăjitoarea (yellow card) 34', (goal) 45+1' (pen.); Lazăr (yellow card) 37'; Rotaru (yellow card) 44'	Stadium: Oțelul; Attendance: 7,000; Referee: Marian Salomir

18 June 2003 Playout 2nd leg	FC Oradea	3–1	Oțelul Galați	Oradea
17:30	Vrăjitoarea 70', 81', 91'	(Report)	Cornea (yellow card) 19'; Tănase 28'; Badea (yellow card) 68'; Iordache (yellow card) 80'	Stadium: Municipal; Attendance: 20,000; Referee: Cristian Balaj

=== Cupa României ===
6 November 2002 Round of 32	Industria Sârmii Câmpia Turzii	3–0	Oțelul Galați	Câmpia Turzii
13:00	Anca 23'; Mitiu 71'; M. Bratu 72'			Stadium: Mechel; Attendance: 4,000; Referee: Orlando Trandu

== Players ==
=== Squad statistics ===
				Total			Divizia A		Cupa României		Relegation playoffs	
No.	Pos.	Nat.	Name	Sts	App	Gls	App	Gls	App	Gls	App	Gls
–		(Brazil)	Vieira	1	7		7					
–		(Romania)	Apostol		1				1			
–		(Romania)	Apostu		3		3					
–		(Romania)	Badea	26	29	1	27	1			2	
–		(Romania)	Bar	22	27		25				2	
–	GK	(Romania)	Borş	12	13		12		1			
–	FW	(Romania)	Bucătaru	11	21	3	20	3			1	
–		(Romania)	Bucur		3		2				1	
–		(Romania)	Cernat	9	18		15		1		2	
–		(Romania)	Chiriţă	1	3		2		1			
–		(Romania)	Cornea	28	30	4	28	3			2	1
–		(Romania)	Costea		1				1			
–		(Romania)	Dascălu	1	1				1			
–	FW	(Romania)	Guriţă	30	31	9	29	8			2	1
–	GK	(Romania)	Iliuciuc	21	21		19				2	
–		(Romania)	Iordache	28	28	2	26	2			2	
–		(Romania)	Maleş		6		6					
–		(Romania)	Mărginean	20	25		24				1	
–		(Romania)	Minescu	14	22		21				1	
–		(Romania)	Miron	1	1				1			
–		(Romania)	Mogoş	1	1				1			
–		(Romania)	Murgoci	1	1				1			
–		(Romania)	Onuţa	1	1				1			
–	FW	(Romania)	Oprea	22	25	4	23	4			2	
–	CB	(Romania)	Pelin	28	28		26				2	
–		(Democratic Republic of the Congo)	Piana	7	10		10					
–		(Romania)	Popa	1	1				1			
–	FB	(Romania)	Sârghi	1	1				1			
–		(Romania)	Mihai.C		7		6		1			
–		(Romania)	Tănase	28	28	2	26	1			2	1
–		(Romania)	Tofan	28	28	2	26	2			2	
–		(Romania)	Toma	19	26		25				1	
–		(Romania)	Velescu	1	1				1			

Last updated: 11 March 2010
Source: RomanianSoccer and Viaţa Liberă
Ordered by player name
0 shown as blank

== Transfers ==
=== In ===
No.	Pos.	Nat.	Name	Age	EU	Moving from	Type	Transfer window	Ends	Transfer fee	Source
–	DF	(Romania)	Minescu	31	EU	Foresta Fălticeni	Transfer	Summer		Undisclosed	
–	GK	(Romania)	Iliuciuc		EU	Dinamo București	Transfer	Summer		Undisclosed	
–	LM	(Romania)	Cornea	20	EU	Baia Mare	Transfer	Summer		Undisclosed	
–	CB	(Romania)	Iordache	21	EU	Dinamo București	Transfer	Summer		Undisclosed	
–	RB	(Romania)	Baldovin	30	EU	Universitatea Craiova	Transfer	Summer		Undisclosed	
–		(Romania)	Bar		EU	Baia Mare	Transfer	Summer		Undisclosed	
–	DM	(Romania)	Badea	26	EU	Dinamo București	Transfer	Summer		Undisclosed	
–	DF	(Romania)	Chiriță		EU	Radnički Kragujevac (Serbia and Montenegro)	Transfer	Summer		Undisclosed	
–	CB	(Brazil)	Vieira	28	Non-EU		Transfer	Winter	2005	Undisclosed	
–	CB	(Romania)	Nițulescu		EU		Transfer				
–	CF	(Democratic Republic of the Congo)	Piana	21	Non-EU	Troyes (France)	Transfer	Winter	2005	Free	

=== Out ===
No.	Pos.	Nat.	Name	Age	EU	Moving to	Type	Transfer window	Transfer fee	Source
–	LM	(Romania)	Boştină	25	EU	Steaua București	Transfer	Summer	Free	
–	GK	(Romania)	Munteanu	27	EU	Dinamo București	Transfer	Summer	$ 100,000	
–	CB	(Romania)	Ghionea	23	EU	Steaua București	Transfer	Summer	$ 150,000	
–	RB	(Romania)	Ogăraru	22	EU	Steaua București	Loan end	Summer	–	
–	DF	(Romania)	Dinu		EU	Zimbru Chișinău (Moldova)	Transfer	Summer	Undisclosed	
–	CM	(Romania)	Baştină	29	EU	Zimbru Chișinău (Moldova)	Transfer	Summer	Undisclosed	
–	LB	(Romania)	Mozacu	25	EU	Brașov	Contract expired	Summer	–	
–	CF	(Romania)	Andone	27	EU	Ferencváros (Hungary)	Contract expired	Summer	–	

EU = if holds or not a European Union passport; Country: when 2 flags, 1st flag = country that plays for internationally, 2nd flag = country of birth; N = number on jersey; P = Position (for position name, pause mouse pointer on abbreviation); Name = Name on jersey (for more extensive name, pause mouse pointer on name); Age = age on the day of the signing; Moving from = only indicate the club the player was playing before start playing for this club in this season, for the type of the moving see Status column; Moving to = only indicates the club the player is going to play next, for the type of the moving see Status column; Ends = when the player's current contract ends; n/a = Not applicable.
