= 2000–01 FC Oțelul Galați season =

FC Oțelul
2000–01 season
- Chairman: Mihai Stoica (until 10 January 2001); Ion Ionică (from 11 January 2001)
- Manager: Aurel Ţicleanu (until 12 November 2000); Ion Gigi (caretaker); Ilie Dumitrescu (from 6 December 2000)
- Divizia A: 12th
- Cupa României: Quarter-finals
- Top goalscorer: League: Bukvić (8); All: Bukvić (8); Andone (5); Guriță (3); Mozacu (3); Pitu (3); Tofan (3)

The 2000–01 FC Oțelul Galați season saw them compete in the Divizia A, finishing 12th, and they also reached the quarter-finals of the Cupa României.

== Managers ==
They appointed Aurel Ţicleanu as their new manager, after the contract of Dumitru Dumitriu has expired. A few months later, in November, he resigned from the team. The team was left in charge of assistant-manager Ion Gigi until the winter-break. The new manager of the team, Ilie Dumitrescu, was announced on 6 December 2000. His contract ended after the last match of the season, in June 2001.

== Competitions ==
=== Friendlies ===
28 June 2000	Gloria Bistriţa	2–3	Oțelul Galați	Prejmer
	??,	(Report)	Tănase, Buteseacă

8 July 2000	Dunărea Galați	0–2	Oțelul Galați	Galați
10:30		(Report)	Nemţanu; Naghi 50'	Stadium: Dunărea

11 July 2000	Oțelul Galați	2–1	Petrolul Ploiești	Galați
18:00	?,	(Report)	?	Stadium: Oțelul

22 July 2000	Oțelul Galați	5–0	Callatis Mangalia	Galați
	Ion 5'; Guriţă 10', 33'; State 12'; Pânzaru 74'	(Report)		Stadium: Oțelul

28 July 2000	Oțelul Galați	1–0	Dunărea Galați	Galați
18:00	Tofan 77'	(Report)		Stadium: Oțelul

29 July 2000	Callatis Mangalia	0–2	Oțelul Galați	Mangalia
11:00		(Report)	Maleş; Bukvić	Stadium: Central

6 February 2001 Cyprus	LG Seoul (South Korea)	1–0	(Romania) Oțelul Galați	Larnaca
17:30	?' (15)	(Report)

8 February 2001 Cyprus	Chunnam Dragons (South Korea)	0–2	(Romania) Oțelul Galați	Larnaca
15:30		(Report)	Boştină 4'; Iodi 50'

10 February 2001 Cyprus	Torpedo-ZIL (Russia)	0–1	(Romania) Oțelul Galați	Larnaca
17:30		(Report)	Sorin Haraga

13 February 2001 Cyprus	Debreceni (Hungary)	0–2	(Romania) Oțelul Galați	Larnaca
		(Report)	Toma 40'; Cristache 60'

18 February 2001 Cyprus	Alania Vladikavkaz (Russia)	0–1	(Romania) Oțelul Galați	Larnaca
		(Report)	Cristache

24 February 2001	Oțelul Galați	0–0	Petrolul Ploiești	Galați
11:00		(Report)		Stadium: Oțelul

3 March 2001	CF Brăila	2–2	Oțelul Galați	Brăila
		(Report)	Toma; Andone

=== Divizia A ===
==== League table ====
Pos	Team	Pld	W	D	L	GF	GA	GD	Pts	Qualification or relegation
10	Astra Ploiești	30	11	7	12	41	36	+5	40 (Note: AST 0-0 PET; PET 3-1 AST)	
11	Ceahlăul Piatra Neamț	30	9	11	10	36	41	−5	38 (Note: OTE 1-1 CEA; CEA 0-0 OTE)	
12	Oțelul Galați	30	10	8	12	33	39	−6	38	
13	Foresta Fălticeni (R)	30	8	12	10	39	43	−4	36	Qualification to relegation play-offs
14	Bacău	30	9	7	14	38	45	−7	34 (Note: BAC 3-0 ROC; ROC 2-0 BAC)	Qualification to relegation play-offs

Source: LT (in Romanian)
Rules for classification: 1) points; 2) head-to-head points; 3) head-to-head goal difference; 4) head-to-head goals scored; 5) goal difference; 6) number of goals scored.
(R) Relegated

==== Results by round ====
Round	1	2	3	4	5	6	7	8	9	10	11	12	13	14	15	16	17	18	19	20	21	22	23	24	25	26	27	28	29	30
Ground	H	A	H	A	H	A	H	A	H	A	H	A	H	H	A	A	H	A	H	A	H	A	H	A	H	A	H	A	A	H
Result	W	L	L	W	W	D	W	D	D	L	L	L	L	D	D	L	W	W	D	W	W	L	D	L	W	L	L	L	D	W
Position	1	9	12	8	4	6	3	4	4	6	7	10	12	13	12	13	12	10	11	10	7	9	8	10	8	11	12	12	12	12

Source: Matches
A = Away; H = Home; W = Win; D = Draw; L = Loss

==== Results summary ====
Overall								Home						Away					
Pld	W	D	L	GF	GA	GD	Pts	W	D	L	GF	GA	GD	W	D	L	GF	GA	GD
30	10	8	12	33	39	−6	38	7	4	4	21	15	+6	3	4	8	12	24	−12

==== Matches ====
6 August 2000 Matchday 1	Oțelul Galați	4–1	FC Argeș	Galați
17:00	Guriţă 45', 53'; Maleş 50' (pen.); Bukvić 82'		Neaga 23'	Stadium: Oțelul; Referee: Alexandru Tudor

12 August 2000 Matchday 2	FCM Bacău	4–2	Oțelul Galați	Bacău
18:00	Cursaru 30' (pen.), 62', 70'; Trofin 52'		Guriţă 60'; Bukvić 64'	Stadium: Municipal; Referee: Gheorghe Moise

20 August 2000 Matchday 3	Oțelul Galați	0–2	Petrolul Ploiești	Galați
			Pârvu 44'; Orlando 77'	Stadium: Oțelul; Referee: Sorin Corpodean

27 August 2000 Matchday 4	Dinamo București	1–2	Oțelul Galați	Bucharest
	Mihali 29'		Mozacu 20', 28'	Stadium: Dinamo; Referee: Marian Dorobanțu

9 September 2000 Matchday 5	Oțelul Galați	2–1	Rocar București	Galați
	Tofan 21' (pen.); Andone 83' (pen.)	(Report)	Luca 90' (pen.)	Stadium: Oțelul; Referee: Augustus Constantin

16 September 2000 Matchday 6	FC Brașov	0–0	Oțelul Galați	Brașov
		(Report)		Stadium: Tineretului; Attendance: 6,000; Referee: Marian Ezaru

23 September 2000 Matchday 7	Oțelul Galați	2–0	Gloria Bistriţa	Galați
	Andone 42'; Bukvić 60'			Stadium: Oțelul; Attendance: 10,000; Referee: Gheorghe Moise

30 September 2000 Matchday 8	Foresta Fălticeni	1–1	Oțelul Galați	Fălticeni
17:00	Niţă 11'	(Report)	Bukvić 9'	Referee: Iulian Udrică

13 October 2000 Matchday 9	Oțelul Galați	1–1	Universitatea Craiova	Galați
14:00	Tofan 21'	(Report)	Rednic 58'	Stadium: Oțelul; Referee: Alexandru Tudor

20 October 2000 Matchday 10	Astra Ploiești	2–1	Oțelul Galați	Ploiești
17:00	Crăciun 39', 44'		Mozacu 38'	Stadium: Astra; Referee: Marian Salomir

28 October 2000 Matchday 11	Oțelul Galați	1–2	Naţional București	Galați
15:00	Ion 5'	(Report)	Ilie 70', 90'	Stadium: Oțelul; Referee: Marcel Lică

5 November 2000 Matchday 12	Rapid București	2–1	Oțelul Galați	Bucharest
	Pancu 29' (pen.); Iencsi 67'		Andone 31' (pen.)	Stadium: Giuleşti – Valentin Stănescu; Referee: Sorin Altmayer

12 November 2000 Matchday 13	Oțelul Galați	0–1	Steaua București	Galați
14:00			Dănciulescu 87'	Stadium: Oțelul; Referee: Marian Dorobanţu

18 November 2000 Matchday 14	Oțelul Galați	1–1	Ceahlăul Piatra Neamţ	Galați
14:00	Bukvić 23'	(Report)	Cozma 70'	Stadium: Oțelul; Referee: Cristian Balaj

25 November 2000 Matchday 15	Gaz Metan	0–0	Oțelul Galați	Mediaş
14:00		(Report)		Stadium: Municipal; Referee: Constantin Zotta

10 March 2001 Matchday 16	FC Argeș	2–0	Oțelul Galați	Pitești
	Stan 84'; Dică 88'	(Report)		Stadium: Nicolae Dobrin; Referee: Valeriu Ioniţă

17 March 2001 Matchday 17	Oțelul Galați	2–1	FCM Bacău	Galați
14:00	Vlad 20'; Andone 75'		Trofin 42'	Stadium: Oțelul; Referee: Marian Salomir

31 March 2001 Matchday 18	Petrolul Ploiești	0–1	Oțelul Galați	Ploiești
16:00		(Report)	Pitu 37'	Stadium: Ilie Oană; Referee: Constantin Frăţilă

8 April 2001 Matchday 19	Oțelul Galați	0–0	Dinamo București	Galați
17:00		(Report)		Stadium: Oțelul; Attendance: 10,000; Referee: Tiberiu Lajos

14 April 2001 Matchday 20	Rocar București	1–3	Oțelul Galați	Bucharest
	Luca 77' (pen.)	(Report)	Bukvić 48', 89'; Andone 83'	Stadium: Rocar; Attendance: 1,500; Referee: Marian Ezaru

21 April 2001 Matchday 21	Oțelul Galați	3–1	FC Brașov	Galați
14:00	Baştină 22'; Bukvić 41'; Tofan 70'	(Report)	Vascko 55'	Stadium: Oțelul; Referee: Alexandru Deaconu

28 April 2001 Matchday 22	Gloria Bistriţa	2–0	Oțelul Galați	Bistriţa
	Mândrean 40'; Turcu 70'	(Report)		Stadium: Gloria; Attendance: 2,000; Referee: Dudu Georgescu Jr.

2 May 2001 Matchday 23	Oțelul Galați	0–0	Foresta Suceava	Galați
		(Report)		Stadium: Oțelul; Referee: Sorin Altmayer

5 May 2001 Matchday 24	Universitatea Craiova	3–1	Oțelul Galați	Craiova
	Bărcăuan 34'; Niculescu 45'; Grigorie 85'	(Report)	Pitu 43'	Stadium: Ion Oblemenco; Referee: Gheorghe Moise

12 May 2001 Matchday 25	Oțelul Galați	1–0	Astra Ploiești	Constanța
18:00	Pitu 67'	(Report)		Stadium: Farul; Referee: Cristian Balaj

16 May 2001 Matchday 26	Naţional București	1–0	Oțelul Galați	Bucharest
18:00	Carabaș 75'	(Report)		Stadium: Cotroceni; Referee: Constantin Frăţilă

19 May 2001 Matchday 27	Oțelul Galați	1–4	Rapid București	Galați
18:00	Cristache 88'	(Report)	Pancu 16', 73', 85', 89'	Stadium: Oțelul; Referee: Marian Dorobanţu

26 May 2001 Matchday 28	Steaua București	5–0	Oțelul Galați	Bucharest
18:00	Răducanu 45' (pen.), 76', 87'; Trică 56'; Liță 73'	(Report)		Stadium: Steaua; Referee: Tiberiu Lajos

9 June 2001 Matchday 29	Ceahlăul Piatra Neamţ	0–0	Oțelul Galați	Piatra Neamţ
18:00				Stadium: Ceahlăul; Referee: Sorin Corpodean

13 June 2001 Matchday 30	Oțelul Galați	3–0	Gaz Metan	Galați
18:00	Cristache 19'; Toma 72'; Maleş 90'	(Report)		Stadium: Oțelul; Referee: Alexandru Deaconu

=== Cupa României ===
6 September 2000 Round of 32	Metalul Filipeştii-de-Padure	0–2	Oțelul Galați	Piatra Neamţ
		(Report)	Maleş 11', 24'	Stadium: Ceahlăul; Referee: Dudu Georgescu Jr.

8 November 2000 Round of 16	Oțelul Galați	2–1	Gloria Bistriţa	Brașov
	State 28'; Bukvic 40'		Bârsan 47'	Stadium: Tractorul; Referee: Iosif Biro

29 November 2000 Quarter-finals	FC Sportul Studenţesc București	0–0 (a.e.t.) (4 – 3 p)	Oțelul Galați	Buzău
13:00	Bucur; Chihaia; Diniță; Cruceru		Maleş; Andone; Haraga	Stadium: Crâng; Referee: Sorin Altmayer

== Players ==
=== Transfers ===
==== In ====
No.	Pos.	Nat.	Name	Age	EU	Moving from	Type	Transfer window	Ends	Transfer fee	Source
–	GK	(Romania)	Brăneţ	22	EU	Dunărea Galați	Transfer	Summer		Undisclosed	
–	FW	(Romania)	State	32	EU	CSM Focşani	Transfer	Summer		Undisclosed	
–	[[|S]]	(Romania)	Bukvić	24	EU	Vojvodina (Federal Republic of Yugoslavia)	Transfer	Summer		Undisclosed	
–	DF	(Romania)	Andone		EU	Corvinul	Transfer	Summer		Undisclosed	
-	MF	(Romania)	Andone	25	EU	Rapid București	Transfer	Summer		Undisclosed	
–	RM	(Romania)	Vlad	23	EU	Dinamo București	Loan	Winter		Undisclosed	
–	FW	(Romania)	Cristache	20	EU	Steaua București	Loan	Winter		Undisclosed	
–	DF	(Romania)	Mihai.C	18	EU	Dunărea Galați	Loan	Winter		Undisclosed	
		(Romania)	Iodi		EU	Dinamo București	Loan	Winter		Undisclosed	
		(Romania)	Oajdea		EU	Romprim București	Transfer	Winter		Undisclosed	
	ST	(Romania)	Puşcaş	29	EU	Politehnica Iași	Transfer	Winter		Undisclosed	

EU = if holds or not a European Union passport; Country: when 2 flags, 1st flag = country that plays for internationally, 2nd flag = country of birth; N = number on jersey; P = Position (for position name, pause mouse pointer on abbreviation); Name = Name on jersey (for more extensive name, pause mouse pointer on name); Age = age on the day of the signing; Moving from = only indicate the club the player was playing before start playing for this club in this season, for the type of the moving see Status column; Moving to = only indicates the club the player is going to play next, for the type of the moving see Status column; Ends = when the player's current contract ends; n/a = Not applicable.

==== Out ====
No.	Pos.	Nat.	Name	Age	EU	Moving to	Type	Transfer window	Transfer fee	Source
–	[[|S]]	(Romania)	Oprea	27	EU	BFC Dynamo (Germany)	Transfer	Summer	Undisclosed	
–	[[|S]]	(Romania)	Mihalache	25	EU	Astra Ploiești	Transfer	Summer	Undisclosed	
–	CB	(Romania)	Nemţanu	26	EU	Rocar București	Transfer	Summer	Undisclosed	
–	DF	(Romania)	Andone		EU		Released	Winter	–	
–	WI	(Romania)	Spirea	31	EU		Released	Winter	–	
–	FW	(Romania)	State	32	EU		Released	Winter	–	
–	FW	(Romania)	Voicilă	21	EU		Released	Winter	–	
–	LB	(Romania)	Mozacu	24	EU	Petrolul Ploiești	Contract expired	Winter	–	
–	FW	(Romania)	Ion	33	EU	Rapid București	Transfer	Winter	Undisclosed	
-	CM	(Romania)	Humelnicu	23	EU	Gloria Buzău	Loan	Winter	Undisclosed	

EU = if holds or not a European Union passport; Country: when 2 flags, 1st flag = country that plays for internationally, 2nd flag = country of birth; N = number on jersey; P = Position (for position name, pause mouse pointer on abbreviation); Name = Name on jersey (for more extensive name, pause mouse pointer on name); Age = age on the day of the signing; Moving from = only indicate the club the player was playing before start playing for this club in this season, for the type of the moving see Status column; Moving to = only indicates the club the player is going to play next, for the type of the moving see Status column; Ends = when the player's current contract ends; n/a = Not applicable.

== See also ==
- 2000–01 Divizia A
- 2000–01 Cupa României
