= 1999–2000 FC Oțelul Galați season =

FC Oțelul
1999–2000 season
- Chairman: Mihai Stoica
- Manager: Dumitru Dumitriu
- Divizia A: 8th
- Cupa României: Semi-finals
- Top goalscorer: League: Maleş (7); All: Maleş (7); Mihalache (7); Oprea (6); Ion (4); Tofan (4); Andone (3); Baştină (3); Cernat (3); Guriță (3); Mozacu (3); Niță (3); Tănase (3)

Oțelul have appointed Dumitru Dumitriu as their new manager after Vasile Simionaş left the team in early June.

== Competitions ==
=== Divizia A ===
==== League table ====
Pos	Team	Pld	W	D	L	GF	GA	GD	Pts
6	Gloria Bistrița	34	17	2	15	54	49	+5	53
7	Bacău	34	15	6	13	40	39	+1	51
8	Oțelul Galați	34	15	4	15	59	55	+4	49 (Note: OTE 2–0 PRO; PRO 1–1 OTE)
9	Național București	34	15	4	15	61	44	+17	49
10	Astra Ploiești	34	13	8	13	43	41	+2	47

Source: LT (in Romanian)
Rules for classification: 1) points; 2) head-to-head points; 3) head-to-head goal difference; 4) head-to-head goals scored; 5) goal difference; 6) number of goals scored.

==== Results by round ====
Round	1	2	3	4	5	6	7	8	9	10	11	12	13	14	15	16	17	18	19	20	21	22	23	24	25	26	27	28	29	30	31	32	33	34
Ground	A	H	A	H	A	H	A	H	A	H	A	H	A	H	A	H	A	H	A	H	A	H	A	H	A	H	A	H	A	H	A	H	A	H
Result	W	W	L	W	L	W	D	W	D	L	L	L	L	W	L	L	L	D	L	W	L	W	L	W	W	W	W	W	D	W	L	L	L	W
Position	4	1	2	2	2	2	3	3	3	6	6	7	9	8	9	11	12	11	13	11	13	11	12	12	10	9	8	6	8	7	7	9	11	9

Source: Matches
A = Away; H = Home; W = Win; D = Draw; L = Loss

==== Results summary ====
Overall								Home						Away					
Pld	W	D	L	GF	GA	GD	Pts	W	D	L	GF	GA	GD	W	D	L	GF	GA	GD
34	15	4	15	59	55	+4	49	12	1	4	39	20	+19	3	3	11	20	35	−15

==== Matches ====
24 July 1999 Matchday 1	Gloria Bistriţa	2–3	Oțelul Galați	Bistriţa
	Predatu 8'; Matei 44'	(Report)	Tănase 40'; Mihalache 43'; Tofan 75' (pen.)	Stadium: Gloria; Referee: Sorin Vădana

31 July 1999 Matchday 2	Oțelul Galați	8–2	Extensiv Craiova	Galați
18:00	Baştină 22', 44', 69'; Tănase 24'; Oprea 34'; Ştirbulescu 46' (o.g.); Mihalache 51'; Niţă 90'		Răducanu 14'; Rotariu 52' (pen.)	Stadium: Oțelul; Referee: Constantin Ene

4 August 1999 Matchday 3	Petrolul Ploieşti	2–1	Oțelul Galați	Ploieşti
	Irimescu 24'; Vlad 84'	(Report)	Tănase 42'	Stadium: Ilie Oană; Attendance: 6,000; Referee: Constantin Zotta

7 August 1999 Matchday 4	Oțelul Galați	2–1	Rocar București	Galați
18:00	Mihalache 60', 88'		Lică 89'	Stadium: Oțelul; Referee: Anton Heleşteanu

13 August 1999 Matchday 5	FC Brașov	3–0	Oțelul Galați	Braşov
	Ivan 9' (pen.), 79'; Manole 50'			Stadium: Silviu Ploieşteanu; Referee: Gheorghe Moise

21 August 1999 Matchday 6	Oțelul Galați	2–0	Rapid București	Galați
	Maleş 57'; Guriţă 89'			Stadium: Oțelul; Referee: Marian Salomir

28 August 1999 Matchday 7	Naţional București	1–1	Oțelul Galați	Bucharest
	Niculescu 4'		Oprea 87'	Stadium: Cotroceni; Referee: Sorin Corpodean

11 September 1999 Matchday 8	Oțelul Galați	2–1	FC Oneşti	Galați
17:00	Niţă 46'; Cernat 52'		Bilaşco 37'	Stadium: Oțelul; Referee: Laszlo Saitos

18 September 1999 Matchday 9	Farul Constanţa	1–1	Oțelul Galați	Constanţa
	Stere 38'		Haraga 84'	Stadium: Farul; Referee: Alexandru Tudor

25 September 1999 Matchday 10	Oțelul Galați	1–2	FCM Reşiţa	Galați
	Stan 85'	(Report)	Nică 55'; Stanciu 77'	Stadium: Oțelul; Attendance: 5,000; Referee: Sorin Corpodean

1 October 1999 Matchday 11	Universitatea Craiova	4–0	Oțelul Galați	Craiova
	Cristescu 15', 32', 79'; Niculescu 74'	(Report)		Stadium: Ion Oblemenco; Attendance: 15,000; Referee: Constantin Frăţilă

16 October 1999 Matchday 12	Oțelul Galați	0–1	Astra Ploieşti	Galați
			Rohat 32'	Stadium: Oțelul; Referee: Sorin Altmayer

23 October 1999 Matchday 13	FCM Bacău	1–0	Oțelul Galați	Bacău
	Trofin 56'	(Report)		Stadium: Municipal; Attendance: 7,000; Referee: Valeriu Ioniţă

26 October 1999 Matchday 14	Oțelul Galați	3–0	Ceahlăul Piatra Neamţ	Galați
	Mihalache 48'; Tofan 62'; Cernat 75'	(Report)		Stadium: Oțelul; Attendance: 4,000; Referee: Gheorghe Farcaş

30 October 1999 Matchday 15	Steaua București	2–1	Oțelul Galați	Bucharest
	Ilie 18'; Ciocoiu 60'		Mihalache 10'	Stadium: Steaua; Referee: Marcel Lică

5 November 1999 Matchday 16	Oțelul Galați	1–2	FC Argeş	Galați
	Baştină 35'	(Report)	Ghindă 27', 60'	Stadium: Oțelul; Attendance: 3,000; Referee: Constantin Zotta

14 November 1999 Matchday 17	Dinamo București	3–2	Oțelul Galați	Bucharest
	Mihalcea 27'; Mihali 44'; Mutu 54'		Baştină 14'; Ion 16'	Stadium: Dinamo; Referee: Marian Dorobanțu

20 November 1999 Matchday 18	Oțelul Galați	0–0	Gloria Bistriţa	Galați
13:30		(Report)		Stadium: Oțelul; Attendance: 10,000; Referee: Iulian Udrică

27 November 1999 Matchday 19	Extensiv Craiova	3–0	Oțelul Galați	Craiova
	Popescu 37', 47'; Răducanu 65'			Stadium: Extensiv; Referee: Alexandru Tudor

5 December 1999 Matchday 20	Oțelul Galați	3–2	Petrolul Ploieşti	Galați
	Maleş 35' (pen.); Cernat 66'; Niţă 83'		Orlando 60'; Pârvu 89'	Stadium: Oțelul; Referee: Tiberiu Laios

4 March 2000 Matchday 21	Rocar București	3–2	Oțelul Galați	Bucharest
15:30	Pitu 21'; Călin 25'; Iacob 83'		Ion 41'; Oprea 82'	Stadium: Rocar; Referee: Iosif Biro

10 March 2000 Matchday 22	Oțelul Galați	1–0	FC Brașov	Galați
	Maleş 44' (pen.)	(Report)		Stadium: Oțelul; Referee: Constantin Zotta

18 March 2000 Matchday 23	Rapid București	2–1	Oțelul Galați	Bucharest
	Iencsi 43' (pen.); Dăscălescu 55'	(Report)	Oprea 84'	Stadium: Giuleşti – Valentin Stănescu; Referee: Sorin Altmayer

22 March 2000 Matchday 24	Oțelul Galați	2–0	Naţional București	Galați
	Ion 23'; Maleş 74'	(Report)		Stadium: Oțelul; Attendance: 6,500; Referee: Marian Salomir

25 March 2000 Matchday 25	FC Oneşti	0–3	Oțelul Galați	Oneşti
		(Report)	Guriţă 44', 86'; Tofan 64'	Stadium: FC Oneşti; Referee: Gheorghe Moise

31 March 2000 Matchday 26	Oțelul Galați	1–0	Farul Constanţa	Galați
	Balint 54'	(Report)		Stadium: Oțelul; Attendance: 5,000; Referee: Iosif Biro

5 April 2000 Matchday 27	FCM Reşiţa	1–2	Oțelul Galați	Reşiţa
	Ciucur 49'	(Report)	Andone 3'; Ion 29'	Stadium: Municipal; Referee: Constantin Zotta

8 April 2000 Matchday 28	Oțelul Galați	1–0	Universitatea Craiova	Galați
	Nemţanu 87'	(Report)		Stadium: Oțelul; Referee: Alexandru Tudor

16 April 2000 Matchday 29	Astra Ploieşti	1–1	Oțelul Galați	Ploieşti
	Savu 35'		Mozacu 77'	Stadium: Astra; Referee: Constantin Ene

21 April 2000 Matchday 30	Oțelul Galați	3–1	FCM Bacău	Galați
15:30	Andone 27'; Oprea 43'; Toma 81'	(Report)	Serea 5'	Stadium: Oțelul; Attendance: 4,000; Referee: Marian Salomir

28 April 2000 Matchday 31	Ceahlăul Piatra Neamţ	3–2	Oțelul Galați	Piatra Neamţ
	Scânteie 22', 72'; Nemţanu 51'	(Report)	Guriţă 31'; Mozacu 39'	Stadium: Ceahlăul; Referee: Marcel Lică

3 May 2000 Matchday 32	Oțelul Galați	4–5	Steaua București	Galați
15:00	Ghionea 27'; Andone 58'; Maleş 68'; Boştină 80'		Răducanu 5', 31', 38', 55'; Roşu 48'	Stadium: Oțelul; Referee: Iosif Biro

6 May 2000 Matchday 33	FC Argeş	3–0	Oțelul Galați	Piteşti
	Ghindă 44'; Neaga 58'; Chiriţă 63'			Stadium: Nicolae Dobrin; Referee: Alexandru Tudor

10 May 2000 Matchday 34	Oțelul Galați	5–3	Dinamo București	Galați
	Maleş 11', 44'; Spirea 73'; Voicilă 76'; Mozacu 89'	(Report)	Mara 8'; Drăgan 59'; Bălţoi 67'	Stadium: Oțelul; Attendance: 14,000; Referee: Sorin Altmayer

=== Cupa României ===
22 September 1999 Round of 32	Cimentul Fieni	1–2	Oțelul Galați	Fieni
	Gânju 27' (pen.)		Maleş 6'; Boştină 97'	Stadium: Cimentul; Referee: Iulian Udrică

13 October 1999 Round of 16	Astra Ploieşti	1–2	Oțelul Galați	Buzău
	Ciorea 57'	(Report)	Tofan 43', 94'	Stadium: Crâng; Referee: Florin Chivulete

10 November 1999 Quarter-finals	FCM Reşiţa	1–2	Oțelul Galați	Sibiu
	Ciocoi 39'	(Report)	Tofan 76'; Ion 86'	Stadium: Arini; Referee: Sorin Altmayer

15 March 2000 Semi-finals 1st leg	Oțelul Galați	0–2	Dinamo București	Galați
			Drăgan 28'; Mihalcea 85'	Stadium: Oțelul; Referee: Sorin Corpodean

12 April 2000 Semi-finals 2nd leg	Dinamo București	3–1	Oțelul Galați	Bucharest
14:00	Petre 19'; Petre 53'; Niculae 63'		Guriță 44'	Stadium: Dinamo; Referee: Constantin Fraţilă

== Players ==
=== Transfers ===
==== In ====
No.	Pos.	Nat.	Name	Age	EU	Moving from	Type	Transfer window	Ends	Transfer fee	Source
-	CF	(Romania)	Andone	24	EU	Rapid București	Transfer	Winter		Undisclosed	
-	GK	(Romania)	Munteanu	25	EU	Progresul București	Transfer	Winter		Undisclosed	
-	CF	(Romania)	Niţă	22	EU	Cimentul Fieni	Transfer	Summer		Undisclosed	
-	CF	(Romania)	Voicilă	20	EU	Rulmentul Alexandria	Transfer	Summer		Undisclosed	
-	CM	(Romania)	Boştină	22	EU	Cimentul Fieni	Transfer	Summer		Undisclosed	
-	RB	(Romania)	Toma	23	EU	CSM Focşani	Transfer	Summer		Undisclosed	
-	CM	(Romania)	Baştină	25	EU	Petrolul Ploiești	Transfer	Summer		Undisclosed	
-	CM	(Romania)	Humelnicu	21	EU	Dunărea Galați	Transfer	Summer		Undisclosed	
-	CF	(Romania)	Știrbulescu		EU	Extensiv Craiova	Transfer	Summer		Undisclosed	
-	GK	(Romania)	Bodea	20	EU	Youth club	Transfer	Summer		Undisclosed	

==== Out ====
No.	Pos.	Nat.	Name	Age	EU	Moving from	Type	Transfer window	Ends	Transfer fee	Source
-	CF	(Romania)	Niţă	22	EU	Steaua București	Transfer	Winter		Undisclosed	
-	CM	(Romania)	Cernat	19	EU	Dinamo București	Transfer	Summer		Undisclosed	
-	CM	(Romania)	Tănase	29	EU	Maccabi Netanya (Israel)	Transfer	Winter		Undisclosed	
-	GK	(Romania)	Arcanu	29	EU	Rocar București	Transfer	Winter		Undisclosed	
-	DF	(Romania)	Alexa	25	EU	Zimbru Chișinău (Moldova)	Free	Summer		Undisclosed	
-	DF	(Romania)	Gigi	31	EU	SV Sandhausen (Germany)	Transfer	Summer		Undisclosed	
-	DF	(Romania)	Ştefan	32	EU	Anagennisi Deryneia (Cyprus)	Transfer	Summer		Undisclosed	
-	CF	(Romania)	Buteseacă	20	EU	Cimentul Fieni	Transfer	Summer		Undisclosed	
-	CM	(Romania)	Muha	20	EU	Politehnica Iași	Transfer	Summer		Undisclosed	
-	CM	(Romania)	Mihai.C	17	EU	Dunărea Galați	Transfer	Summer		Undisclosed	
-	CF	(Romania)	Bogdan	20	EU	Dunărea Galați	Transfer	Summer		Undisclosed	
-	DF	(Romania)	Ariton	20	EU		Transfer	Summer		Undisclosed	
-	CM	(Romania)	Higlău		EU		Transfer	Summer		Undisclosed	
-		(Romania)	Van Caval	20	EU		Transfer	Summer		Undisclosed	
-	DF	(Romania)	Miloiu		EU		Transfer	Summer		Undisclosed	
-	CF	(Romania)	Silian		EU		Transfer	Summer		Undisclosed	
-	CF	(Romania)	Basalâc		EU		Transfer	Summer		Undisclosed	

EU = if holds or not a European Union passport; Country: when 2 flags, 1st flag = country that plays for internationally, 2nd flag = country of birth; N = number on jersey; P = Position (for position name, pause mouse pointer on abbreviation); Name = Name on jersey (for more extensive name, pause mouse pointer on name); Age = age on the day of the signing; Moving from = only indicate the club the player was playing before start playing for this club in this season, for the type of the moving see Status column; Moving to = only indicates the club the player is going to play next, for the type of the moving see Status column; Ends = when the player's current contract ends; n/a = Not applicable.

== See also ==
- 1999–2000 Divizia A
- 1999–2000 Cupa României
