= 2001–02 FC Oțelul Galați season =

FC Oțelul
2001–02 season
- Chairman: Ion Ionică
- Manager: Victor Roşca (until Feb 6, 2002); Marius Lăcătuş (from Feb 11, 2002)
- Divizia A: 5th
- Cupa României: Round of 32
- Top goalscorer: League: Guriță (11); All: Guriță (11); Mihalache (7); Maleş (7); Oprea (6); Ion (4); Tofan (4)

Victor Roşca who was appointed on July 4, 2001, left the team in February 2002. Few days later, Lăcătuş was appointed as the new manager.

== Competitions ==
=== Friendlies ===
21 July 2001	Petrolul Ploieşti	2–1	Oțelul Galați	Ploieşti
18:00	?,	(Report)	Baştină	Stadium: Ilie Oană

6 February 2002	Oțelul Galați	3–1	Farul Constanţa	Galați
13:00	Tănase 3'; Boştină 35'; Maleş 70'	(Report)	Mihai 40'	Stadium: Siderurgistul; Attendance: 1,500; Referee: Sorin Burloiu

16 February 2002	Petrolul Ploieşti	1–3	Oțelul Galați	Ploieşti
13:00	Todoran ?' (pen.)	(Report)	Baştină; Tofan; Andone	Stadium: Ilie Oană

20 February 2002	Laminorul Roman	0–0	Oțelul Galați	Roman
		(Report)		Stadium: Moldova

27 February 2002	Oțelul Galați	0–0	Laminorul Roman	Galați
15:00		(Report)		Stadium: Oțelul

1 March 2002	Oțelul Galați	4–2	FCM Bacău	Galați
14:00	Andone 31'; Guriţă 53'; Boştină 67', 79'	(Report)	Cursaru 57'; Ilie 90'	Stadium: Oțelul

=== Divizia A ===
==== League table ====
Pos	Team	Pld	W	D	L	GF	GA	GD	Pts	Qualification or relegation
3	Rapid București (Note: Rapid București had 1 point deducted for walking off in round 13.)	30	15	6	9	50	31	+19	50 (Note: RAP 3-0 STE; STE 2-1 RAP)	Qualification to UEFA Cup qualifying round
4	Steaua București	30	15	5	10	47	31	+16	50	
5	Oțelul Galați	30	14	7	9	34	24	+10	49	
6	Bacău	30	14	4	12	43	40	+3	46	
7	Universitatea Craiova	30	12	8	10	40	35	+5	44	

Source: LT (in Romanian)
Rules for classification: 1) points; 2) head-to-head points; 3) head-to-head goal difference; 4) head-to-head goals scored; 5) goal difference; 6) number of goals scored.

==== Results by round ====
Round	1	2	3	4	5	6	7	8	9	10	11	12	13	14	15	16	17	18	19	20	21	22	23	24	25	26	27	28	29	30
Ground	A	H	A	H	A	H	A	H	H	A	H	A	H	A	H	H	A	H	A	H	A	H	A	A	H	A	H	A	H	A
Result	D	W	L	W	L	D	L	W	D	D	W	L	D	L	W	W	W	W	D	W	W	W	L	W	D	L	W	L	W	L
Position	7	5	10	6	10	10	12	9	7	9	6	7	10	11	9	6	6	5	5	4	4	4	4	4	3	5	5	5	4	5

Source: Matches
A = Away; H = Home; W = Win; D = Draw; L = Loss

==== Results summary ====
Overall								Home						Away					
Pld	W	D	L	GF	GA	GD	Pts	W	D	L	GF	GA	GD	W	D	L	GF	GA	GD
30	14	7	9	34	24	+10	49	11	4	0	23	7	+16	3	3	9	11	17	−6

==== Matches ====
4 August 2001 Matchday 1	Naţional București	1–1	Oțelul Galați	Bucharest
	Radu 25'	(Report)	Guriţă 50'	Stadium: Cotroceni; Referee: Augustus Constantin

11 August 2001 Matchday 2	Oțelul Galați	2–1	UM Timişoara	Galați
18:00	Guriţă 53', 84'	(Report)	Toma 52' (o.g.)	Stadium: Oțelul; Attendance: 6,000; Referee: Ştefan Erdei

18 August 2001 Matchday 3	Gloria Bistriţa	1–0	Oțelul Galați	Bistriţa
18:00	Cioloboc 78'	(Report)		Stadium: Gloria; Attendance: 2,000; Referee: Valeriu Ioniţă

26 August 2001 Matchday 4	Oțelul Galați	2–1	Dinamo București	Galați
17:00	Baştină 31'; Andone 43' (pen.)	(Report)	Tameş 67'	Stadium: Oțelul; Attendance: 12,000; Referee: Aurelian Simion

9 September 2001 Matchday 5	Steaua București	2–0	Oțelul Galați	Bucharest
21:30	Stoica 2'; Dănciulescu 60'	(Report)		Stadium: Steaua; Attendance: 4,000; Referee: Cristian Balaj

15 September 2001 Matchday 6	Oțelul Galați	0–0	Farul Constanţa	Galați
17:00		(Report)		Stadium: Oțelul; Attendance: 4,000; Referee: Dudu Georgescu Jr.

22 September 2001 Matchday 7	FC Argeş	1–0	Oțelul Galați	Piteşti
17:00	Iordache 67'			Stadium: Nicolae Dobrin; Referee: Gheorghe Farcaş

28 September 2001 Matchday 8	Oțelul Galați	4–2	Sportul Studenţesc	Galați
17:00	Ghionea 13'; Guriţă 39'; Boştină 55'; Andone 88' (pen.)	(Report)	Diniţă 12'; Ciubotariu 51'	Stadium: Oțelul; Referee: Marian Ezaru

13 October 2001 Matchday 9	Oțelul Galați	0–0	Petrolul Ploieşti	Galați
15:00				Stadium: Oțelul; Referee: Sorin Corpodean

20 October 2001 Matchday 10	Astra Ploieşti	0–0	Oțelul Galați	Ploieşti
				Stadium: Astra; Referee: Alexandru Deaconu

27 October 2001 Matchday 11	Oțelul Galați	3–0	FC Brașov	Galați
15:00	Tofan 18' (pen.); Guriţă 38'; Baştină 87'	(Report)		Stadium: Oțelul; Referee: Teodor Crăciunescu

3 November 2001 Matchday 12	FCM Bacău	1–0	Oțelul Galați	Bacău
	Bădoi 30'			Stadium: Municipal; Referee: Sorin Corpodean

17 November 2001 Matchday 13	Oțelul Galați	0–0	Ceahlăul Piatra Neamţ	Galați
		(Report)		Stadium: Oțelul; Attendance: 4,000; Referee: Marian Dorobanţu

24 November 2001 Matchday 14	Universitatea Craiova	1–0	Oțelul Galați	Craiova
14:00	Grigorie 50'	(Report)		Stadium: Ion Oblemenco; Attendance: 4,500; Referee: Alexandru Tudor

1 December 2001 Matchday 15	Oțelul Galați	2–0	Rapid București	Galați
13:00	Guriţă 4'; Dinu 39'	(Report)		Stadium: Oțelul; Attendance: 3,000; Referee: Cristian Balaj

9 March 2002 Matchday 16	Oțelul Galați	2–0	Naţional București	Galați
15:00	Guriţă 36'; Andone 60' (pen.)	(Report)		Stadium: Oțelul; Referee: Marian Salomir

16 March 2002 Matchday 17	UM Timişoara	0–1	Oțelul Galați	Timișoara
15:30		(Report)	Guriţă 57'	Stadium: UMT; Referee: Ştefan Erdei

23 March 2002 Matchday 18	Oțelul Galați	1–0	Gloria Bistriţa	Galați
16:00	Oprea 86'			Stadium: Oțelul; Referee: Alexandru Tudor

31 March 2002 Matchday 19	Dinamo București	2–2	Oțelul Galați	Bucharest
15:00	Niculescu 12'; Ilie 40'		Tănase 24'; Guriţă 49'	Stadium: Dinamo; Referee: Ionică Serea

6 April 2002 Matchday 20	Oțelul Galați	1–0	Steaua București	Galați
16:00	Tănase 80'	(Report)		Stadium: Oțelul; Attendance: 15,000; Referee: Augustus Constantin

13 April 2002 Matchday 21	Farul Constanţa	0–2	Oțelul Galați	Constanţa
20:00			Andone 1'; Pelin 18'	Stadium: Farul; Referee: Alexandru Deaconu

20 April 2002 Matchday 22	Oțelul Galați	2–1	FC Argeş	Galați
17:00	Guriţă 15'; Oprea 77'	(Report)	Dică 45'	Stadium: Oțelul; Attendance: 15,000; Referee: Sorin Altmayer

28 April 2002 Matchday 23	Sportul Studenţesc	2–1	Oțelul Galați	Bucharest
	Stancu 82'; Diniţă 90'	(Report)	Oprea 66'	Stadium: Regie; Referee: Iosif Biro

1 May 2002 Matchday 24	Petrolul Ploieşti	1–2	Oțelul Galați	Ploieşti
	Todoran 4' (pen.)	(Report)	Oprea 16'; Andone 24' (pen.)	Stadium: Ilie Oană; Referee: Sorin Corpodean

4 May 2002 Matchday 25	Oțelul Galați	0–0	Astra Ploieşti	Galați
11:00		(Report)		Stadium: Oțelul; Referee: Alexandru Tudor

15 May 2002 Matchday 26	FC Brașov	1–0	Oțelul Galați	Braşov
	Ogăraru 46' (o.g.)	(Report)		Stadium: Silviu Ploieşteanu; Referee: Gheorghe Moise

18 May 2002 Matchday 27	Oțelul Galați	2–1	FCM Bacău	Galați
18:00	Tănase 77', 85'		Ciocoiu 45'	Stadium: Oțelul; Referee: Anton Heleşteanu

22 May 2002 Matchday 28	Ceahlăul Piatra Neamţ	2–1	Oțelul Galați	Piatra Neamţ
18:00	Brujan 21'; Lupuţ 85'	(Report)	Andone 23'	Stadium: Ceahlăul; Attendance: 6,000; Referee: Marian Salomir

25 May 2002 Matchday 29	Oțelul Galați	2–1	Universitatea Craiova	Galați
18:00	Tofan 23'; Guriţă 38'	(Report)	Rednic 21'	Stadium: Oțelul; Referee: Alexandru Tudor

1 June 2002 Matchday 30	Rapid București	2–1	Oțelul Galați	Bucharest
18:00	Iencsi 41' (pen.); Bratu 81'		Ogăraru 14'	Stadium: Giuleşti; Referee: Augustus Constantin

=== Cupa României ===
10 October 2001 Round of 32	FC Oradea	2–1	Oțelul Galați	Oradea
	Szabó 17' (pen.); Tofan 74' (o.g.)	(Report)	Maleş 29' (pen.)	Stadium: Municipal; Referee: László Csősz

== Players ==
=== Transfers ===
==== In ====
No.	Pos.	Nat.	Name	Age	EU	Moving from	Type	Transfer window	Ends	Transfer fee	Source
–	MF	(Romania)	Mărginean	22	EU	SN Tulcea	Transfer	Summer		Undisclosed	
–	GK	(Ghana)	Owu	26	Non-EU	King Faisal (Ghana)	Transfer	Summer		Undisclosed	
–	ST	(Nigeria)	Gideon	19	Non-EU	Max United	Transfer	Summer		Undisclosed	
–	RB	(Romania)	Ogăraru	21	EU	Steaua București	Loan	Summer		Undisclosed	
–	LB	(Romania)	Mozacu	24	EU	Petrolul Ploiești	Transfer	Summer		Undisclosed	
–	DF	(Romania)	Dinu	35	EU	Corvinul	Transfer	Summer		Undisclosed	
–	ST	(Romania)	Apostu	19	EU	Corvinul	Transfer	Summer		Undisclosed	
–	ST	(Romania)	Oprea	29	EU	BFC Dynamo (Germany)	Transfer	Winter		Free	
–	LM	(Romania)	Tănase	31	EU	Maccabi Netanya (Israel)	Loan	Winter		Undisclosed	
-	MF	(Romania)	Humelnicu	24	EU	Gloria Buzău	Loan	Winter		Undisclosed	

==== Out ====
No.	Pos.	Nat.	Name	Age	EU	Moving to	Type	Transfer window	Transfer fee	Source
–	GK	(Romania)	Bordeianu	32	EU		Retired	Summer		
–	CB	(Romania)	Balint	32	EU		Contract expired	Summer		
–	AM	(Romania)	Pitu	25	EU	Bacău	Transfer	Summer	Undisclosed	
–	ST	(Federal Republic of Yugoslavia)	Bukvić	25	Non-EU	Argeș Pitești	Transfer	Summer	Undisclosed	
-	RM	(Romania)	Vlad	24	Non-EU	Argeș Pitești	Transfer	Summer	Undisclosed	

EU = if holds or not a European Union passport; Country: when 2 flags, 1st flag = country that plays for internationally, 2nd flag = country of birth; N = number on jersey; P = Position (for position name, pause mouse pointer on abbreviation); Name = Name on jersey (for more extensive name, pause mouse pointer on name); Age = age on the day of the signing; Moving from = only indicate the club the player was playing before start playing for this club in this season, for the type of the moving see Status column; Moving to = only indicates the club the player is going to play next, for the type of the moving see Status column; Ends = when the player's current contract ends; n/a = Not applicable.

== See also ==
- 2001–02 Divizia A
- 2001–02 Cupa României
