= List of ASC Oțelul Galați seasons =

This is a list of seasons played by Oțelul Galați in Romanian and European football, from 1964 to the present day. It details the club's achievements in major competitions, and the top scorers for each season.

Results of league and cup competitions by season
Season	League									RC	SC	UEFA	Top goalscorer(s) (Note: Goals in all competitions are counted.)	Goals
Season	League	Pld	W	D	L	GF	GA	Pts	Pos	RC	SC	UEFA	Top goalscorer(s)	Goals
1967–68	Divizia C	30	15	5	6	39	16	35	1st	—				
1968–69	Divizia B	30	11	8	11	37	34	30	9th	R 32				
1969–70	Divizia B	30	10	9	11	35	38	29	9th	—				
1970–71	Divizia C	30	9	9	12	33	38	27	10th	—				
1971–72	Divizia C	30	11	6	9	37	30	28	4th	—				
1972–73	Divizia C	30	12	6	8	23	19	30	2nd	—				
1973–74	Divizia B	34	15	3	16	41	49	33	7th	—				
1974–75	Divizia B	34	9	6	19	41	56	24	17th	—				
1975–76	The club did not participate in any competitive football.													
1976–77	County Level								1st	—				
1977–78	Divizia C	30	11	3	16	39	41	25	11th	—				
1978–79	Divizia C	30	10	6	14	31	47	26	10th	—				
1979–80	Divizia C	30	13	3	14	38	52	29	9th	—				
1980–81	Divizia C	30	21	6	3	63	16	48	1st	—				
1981–82	Divizia C	34	17	7	6	81	31	41	1st	—				
1982–83	Divizia B	34	16	6	12	61	38	38	3rd	—				
1983–84	Divizia B	34	13	8	13	45	38	34	8th	—				
1984–85	Divizia B	34	15	8	11	63	31	38	3rd	—				
1985–86	Divizia B	34	24	4	6	86	29	52	1st	QF				
1986–87	Divizia A	34	11	10	13	37	36	32	11th	QF			Haralambie Antohi	13
1987–88	Divizia A	34	18	3	13	49	46	39	4th	R 32				
1988–89	Divizia A	34	11	6	17	36	59	28	16th	R 32		UEFA Cup – R1		
1989–90	Divizia B	34	20	0	14	54	35	40	3rd	—				
1990–91	Divizia B	34	21	5	8	65	30	47	1st	R 32				
1991–92	Divizia A	34	15	5	14	38	46	35	8th	R 16				
1992–93	Divizia A	34	13	6	15	40	49	32	10th	R 32				
1993–94	Divizia A	34	12	5	17	38	47	29	15th	R 32				
1994–95	Divizia A	34	11	9	14	47	51	42	13th	R 16				
1995–96	Divizia A	34	14	3	17	42	46	45	13th	R 16				
1996–97	Divizia A	34	17	7	10	54	39	58	4th	R 16				
1997–98	Divizia A	34	20	4	10	54	28	64	4th	QF		UEFA Cup – Q1	Valentin Ștefan	14
1998–99	Divizia A	34	17	4	13	47	33	55	6th	QF		UEFA Cup – Q2		
1999–2000	Divizia A	34	15	4	15	59	55	49	8th	SF				
2000–01	Divizia A	30	10	8	12	33	39	38	12th	QF				
2001–02	Divizia A	30	14	7	9	34	24	49	5th	R 32			Mihai Guriţă	11
2002–03	Divizia A	30	9	9	12	25	37	36	13th	R 32			Mihai Guriţă	9
2003–04	Divizia A	30	10	13	7	30	26	43	5th	RU			Victoraş Iacob	8
2004–05	Divizia A	30	12	4	14	31	32	40	8th	QF		UEFA Cup – Q2	Victoraş Iacob	16
2005–06	Divizia A	30	10	9	11	35	37	39	9th	QF			Daniel Stan	7
2006–07	Liga I	34	17	5	12	60	56	56	5th	QF			Emil Gabriel Jula	15
2007–08	Liga I	34	14	4	16	47	50	46	8th	R 16		UEFA Cup – Q2	Emil Gabriel Jula	22
2008–09	Liga I	34	11	7	16	37	48	40	12th	R 16			Gabriel Paraschiv	9
2009–10	Liga I	34	14	8	12	38	38	50	8th	R 16			Axente Antal Giurgiu Paraschiv	5
2010–11	Liga I	34	21	7	6	46	25	70	1st	R 32			Marius Pena	8
2011–12	Liga I	34	15	7	12	34	29	52	6th	QF	W	Champions League – Group	Didi	8
2012–13	Liga I	34	11	10	13	38	42	41	11th	SF			Iorga	8
2013–14	Liga I	34	12	5	17	43	52	41	10th	QF			Marquinhos	12
2014–15	Liga I	34	7	11	16	24	45	32	17th	R 16				
2015–16	Liga II	24	3	3	18	12	43	12	13th	5th R				
2016–17	Liga IV	26	26	0	0	185	14	78	1st	—				
2017–18	Liga III	28	17	9	2	55	15	60	3rd	—				
2018–19	Liga III	28	17	5	6	48	29	56	3rd	3rd R				
2019–20	Liga III	16	9	3	4	25	20	30	6th	3rd R				
2020–21	Liga III	18	13	2	3	54	13	41	1st	2nd R				
2021–22	Liga III	18	15	1	2	54	10	46	1st	3rd R				
2022–23	Liga II	29	14	7	8	29	25	49	3rd	GS			George Cârjan	6
2023–24	Liga I	39	12	17	10	42	43	53	8th	RU			Alexandru Pop	11
2024–25	Liga I	39	13	12	14	37	37	51	8th	GS			Frédéric Maciel Răzvan Tănasă	6
2025–26	Liga I	39	15	10	14	57	47	55	9th	GS			Pedro Nuno	8

== Key ==
- Pld = Matches played
- W = Matches won
- D = Matches drawn
- L = Matches lost
- GF = Goals for
- GA = Goals against
- Pts = Points
- Pos = Final position
- 2nd R = 2nd Round
- 3rd R = 3rd Round
- 4th R = 4th Round
- 5th R = 5th Round
- R 32 = Last 32
- R 16 = Last 16
- GS = Group-stage
- QF = Quarter-finals
- SF = Semi-finals
- RU = Runners-up
- W = Winners

Champions	Runners-up	Division winners	Division runners-up	Promoted	Relegated
