= Principles of Life =

2010 Romanian drama film

- Directed by: Constantin Popescu
- Written by: Răzvan Rădulescu; Alexandru Baciu
- Produced by: Ada Solomon
- Starring: Vlad Ivanov
- Cinematography: Liviu Marghidian
- Edited by: Corina Stavila
- Production companies: HiFilm Productions; Scharf Advertising; Tandem Film
- Release date: 2010
- Running time: 97 minutes
- Country: Romania
- Language: Romanian
- Budget: €600,000

Principles of Life (Romanian: Principii de viață) is a 2010 Romanian drama film directed by Constantin Popescu and starring Vlad Ivanov. It is set during 24 hour in the life of a middle-class man with a poor connection to his family. It was Popuscu's second feature film, released half a year after his debut, Portrait of the Fighter as a Young Man.

== Production ==
The film was written by Răzvan Rădulescu and Alexandru Baciu. The budget was 600,000 euro. Filming took place in Bucharest from 21 September to 20 October 2009.
