= CSO Boldești-Scăeni =

Romanian football club

- Full name: Clubul Sportiv Orășenesc; Boldești-Scăeni
- Nickname: Boldeștina
- Short name: Boldești-Scăeni
- Founded: 1947; 79 years ago as Petrolistul Boldești
- Ground: Viorel Mateianu
- Capacity: 2,000
- Owners: Boldești-Scăeni Town
- Chairman: Mihail Nicolescu
- Manager: Marius Rădulescu
- League: Liga IV
- 2025–26: Liga IV, Prahova, 3rd of 16
Home colours	Away colours	Third colours

Clubul Sportiv Orășenesc Boldești-Scăeni, commonly known as CSO Boldești-Scăeni, or simply as Boldești-Scăeni, is a Romanian football club based in Boldești-Scăeni, Prahova County, currently playing in Liga IV – Prahova County, the fourth tier of the Romanian football league system. The club was founded in 1947 as Petrolistul Boldești and played for twenty-six seasons in the third Romanian football league.

== History ==
Founded in 1947 as Petrolistul Boldești, the team belonging to the Boldești Oil Scaffold played in the district and regional championships until 1968.

In the 1967–68 season, occupying the 3rd place in East Series of the Ploiești Regional Championship with 29 points (13 wins, 3 draws, 6 losses and 34–25 goals), Petrolistul promoted to Divizia C.

Between 1979 and 1994, the club has evolved into the county championship two times, 1988 and 1990, being close to promotion, finally taking the second place. 1993–94 Divizia C – Prahova County season was dominated by the Petrolistul, who held the first position without "knowing" the defeat (record of the competition) with the following ranking: 30 22 8 0 71–18 52 points. Petrolistul has promoted in Divizia B (as it was then called the third elite of Romanian football, after the National League and Divizia A), with two victories in the play–off match against Victoria Ozun from Covasna County ( 5–0 at Boldești and 3–1 at Ozun).

Remaining without funding, in 2008 the team merged with Voința Kaproni Gornet – a team promoted in that year in the Liga III, becoming Petrolistul Kaproni Boldești. Under this name it was active at this level until the end of the 2009–10 season, when, although occupying the 7th place, owner George Negoițescu, decided to disband the team and gave the place in the Liga III to AFC Filipeștii de Pãdure.

In the summer of 2010, at the initiative of the mayor of Boldești-Scăeni, Constantin Bucuroiu, and the leader of the Boldești Scaffold syndicate, Mihai Nicolescu, „Boldeștina” reappeared in the landscape of the Prahova County football, evolving in the North Series of the Liga V – Prahova County, the fifth tier of the Romanian football league system, which they won without a defeat, promoting to Liga IV – Prahova County.

In the 2014–15 season, Petrolistul Boldești won the Liga IV – Prahova County and the promotion play-off (3–0 at home and 3–0 away) played against Unirea Fierbinți, the winner of Liga IV – Ialomița County, promoted to Liga III. They held on there for two seasons, before relegating back to the county league, even though they had the opportunity to remain, due to some of the promoted teams being unlicensed.

In the summer of 2022, the club was renamed as CSO Boldești-Scăeni.

== Honours ==
Liga III:

- Runners–up (2): 2001–02, 2003–04

Liga IV – Prahova County

- Winners (3): 1993–94, 1999–00, 2014–15
- Runners–up (4): 1987–88, 1989–90, 2012–13, 2013–14

Liga V – Prahova County

- Winners (1): 2010–11

Cupa României – Prahova County

- Winners (5): 1991–92, 1999–2000, 2012–13, 2022–23, 2023–24
- Runners–up (1): 2013–14

=== Other performances ===
- Appearances in Liga III: 26
- Best finish in Cupa României: Round of 32 (1995–96), (2013–14)

== Club officials ==
=== Board of directors ===
Role	Name
Owners	(Romania) Boldești-Scăeni Town
President	(Romania) Mihail Nicolescu
Youth Center Manager	(Romania) Adrian Filostache
Delegate	(Romania) Daniel Richită

=== Current technical staff ===
Role	Name
Manager	(Romania) Marius Rădulescu
Club Doctor	(Romania) Liviu Gheorghe

== League history ==
Season	Tier	Division	Place	Notes	Cupa României
2021–22	4	Liga IV (PH)	10th		
2020–21	Not active due to the COVID-19 pandemic in Romania				
2019–20	4	Liga IV (PH)	3rd		
2018–19	4	Liga IV (PH)	3rd		
2017–18	4	Liga IV (PH)	4th		
2016–17	3	Liga III (Seria II)	13th	Relegated	
2015–16	3	Liga III (Seria II)	7th		
2014–15	4	Liga IV (PH)	1st (C)	Promoted	
2013–14	4	Liga IV (PH)	2nd		Round of 32
2012–13	4	Liga IV (PH)	2nd		
2011–12	4	Liga IV (PH)	3rd		
2010–11	5	Liga V (PH)	1st (C)	Promoted	
2009–10	3	Liga III (Seria III)	7th		
2008–09	3	Liga III (Seria III)	4th		
2005–06	3	Divizia C (Seria IV)	3rd		
2004–05	3	Divizia C (Seria IV)	7th		
2003–04	3	Divizia C (Seria II)	2nd		
2002–03	3	Divizia C (Seria II)	8th		
2001–02	3	Divizia C (Seria II)	2nd		
2000–01	3	Divizia C (Seria IV)	4th		

Season	Tier	Division	Place	Notes	Cupa României
1999–00	4	Divizia D (PH)	1st (C)	Promoted	
1998–99	3	Divizia C (Seria III)	18th	Relegated	
1997–98	3	Divizia C (Seria II)	10th		
1996–97	3	Divizia C (Seria II)	6th		
1995–96	3	Divizia C (Seria II)	10th		Round of 32
1994–95	3	Divizia C (Seria II)	11th		
1993–94	4	Divizia D (PH)	1st (C)	Promoted	
1989–90	4	Divizia D (PH)	2nd		
1987–88	4	Divizia D (PH)	2nd		
1978–79	3	Divizia C (Seria III)	15th	Relegated	
1977–78	3	Divizia C (Seria IV)	12th		
1976–77	3	Divizia C (Seria III)	11th		
1975–76	3	Divizia C (Seria III)	12th		
1974–75	3	Divizia C (Seria III)	12th		
1973–74	3	Divizia C (Seria III)	4th		
1972–73	3	Divizia C (Seria III)	7th		
1971–72	3	Divizia C (Seria V)	5th		
1970–71	3	Divizia C (Seria II)	6th		
1969–70	3	Divizia C (Seria II)	7th		
1968–69	3	Divizia C (Seria II)	6th		

== Former managers ==
- (Romania) Octavian Dincuță (1987–1990)
- (Romania) Octavian Dincuță (1998–2000)
- (Romania) Octavian Grigore (2000–2002)
- (Romania) Octavian Dincuță (2002–2003)
- (Romania) Valentin Sinescu (2003)
- (Romania) Vasile Cosarek (2005–2006)
