= Paul Ipate =

Romanian actor

- Born: March 17, 1985 (age 41); Bucharest, Romania
- Occupation: Actor

Paul Ipate (Romanian pronunciation: [ˈpa.ul iˈpate]) is a Romanian actor.

== Biography ==
Paul Ipate was born on March 17, 1985, in Bucharest, Romania. He studied acting in the Universitatea Naţională de Artă Teatrală şi Cinematografică I.L. Caragiale București.

Ipate made his film debut in The Paper Will Be Blue and went on to appear in Romanian feature films California Dreamin', Portrait of the Fighter as a Young Man and Visul lui Adalbert. He starred alongside Ioana Blaj in Bric-Brac and played the title role in Claudiu & the Fish.

== Filmography ==
=== Television ===
Year	Title	Role	Notes	Source
2013	Rămâi cu mine	Rudi	1 episode	
2014	O săptămână nebună	Alex Puica		
2014	Un Crăciun altfel!	Alex		

=== Film ===
Year	Title	Role	Notes	Source
2006	The Paper Will Be Blue	Costi		
2006	Datorie	Marius	Short film	
2007	California Dreamin'	Romanian Soldier		
2008	Bric-Brac	Paul	Short film	
2010	Portrait of the Fighter as a Young Man	Nicolae Mazilu		
2011	Visul lui Adalbert	Frusinica		
2012	Hello Kitty		Short film	
2013	Claudiu & the Fish	Claudiu	Short film	
2013	Quod erat demonstrandum	Novicele Iulica		
2015	One Floor Below	Client 1		
2016	Chosen	Aronson		
2016	[Nothing] About Love	Victor		
