= Octavian Dincuță =

Romanian footballer (1947–2018)

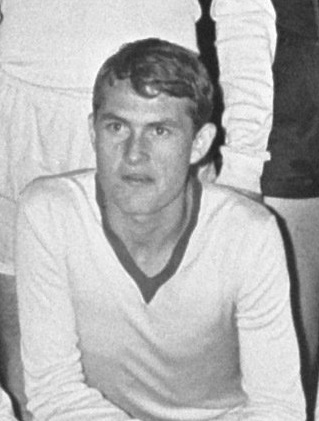

Personal information
- Date of birth: 28 June 1947
- Place of birth: Bucharest, Romania
- Date of death: 28 March 2018 (aged 70)
- Place of death: Bucharest, Romania
- Height: 1.78 m (5 ft 10 in)
- Position: Forward

Senior career*
Years	Team	Apps	(Gls)
1964–1974	Petrolul Ploiești (Note: The statistics for the 1974–75 season are unavailable.)	216	(35)
1975	Metalul Plopeni		
1975	Gloria Buzău		
Total		216	(35)

International career
1966–1970	Romania U23	21	(0)
1966–1970	Romania	5	(0)
1971	Romania Olympic	1	(0)
1967	Romania	1	(0)

Managerial career
- 1975–1987: IUC Ploiești
- 1987–1990: Petrolistul Boldești
- 1990–1998: Vega Ploiești
- 1998–2001: Petrolistul Boldești
- 2001–2002: Petrolul Blejoi
- 2002–2003: Petrolistul Boldești
- * Club domestic league appearances and goals

Octavian Dincuță (28 June 1947 – 28 March 2018) was a Romanian football forward and a manager.

== International career ==
Octavian Dincuță played one friendly game at international level for Romania, appearing on 24 December 1967 when coach Angelo Niculescu used him in order to replace Vasile Gergely at the halftime of a 1–1 against Congo.

== Honours ==
Petrolul Ploiești

- Divizia A: 1965–66
