= Boldești-Scăeni oil field =

Oil field in Romania

Boldești-Scăeni
- Country: Romania
- Region: Prahova County
- Offshore/onshore: onshore
- Operator: Petrom

Field history
- Discovery: 1942
- Start of development: 1942
- Start of production: 1945

Production
- Current production of oil: 23,000 barrels per day (~1.1×10^{6} t/a)
- Estimated oil in place: 43.2 million tonnes (~ 50.4×10^{6} m^{3} or 317 million bbl)
- Estimated gas in place: 1.4×10^{9} m^{3} 50×10^{9} cu ft

The Boldești-Scăeni oil field is an oil field located in Boldești-Scăeni, Prahova County. It was discovered in 1942 and developed by Petrom. It began production in 1945 and produces oil and natural gas. The total proven reserves of the Boldești-Scăeni oil field are around 317 million barrels (43.2 million tonnes), and production is centered on 23,000 barrels per day (3,700 m^{3}/d).
