= Mimi Brănescu =

Romanian actor

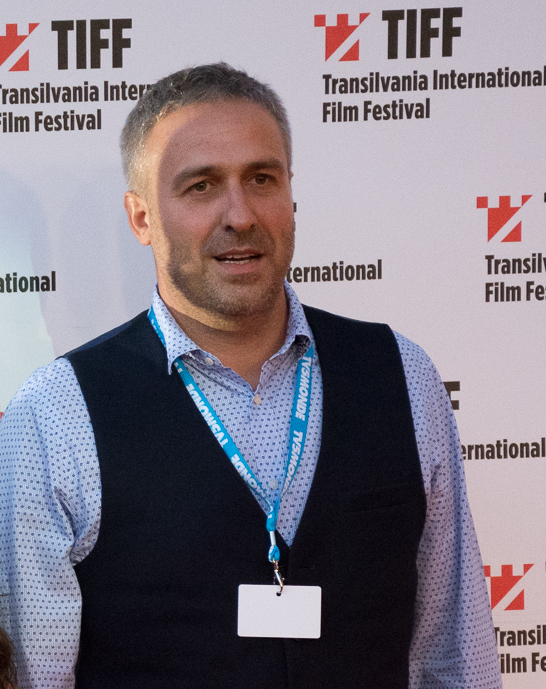
- Born: 31 March 1974 (age 52); Lehliu, Romania
- Occupation: Actor
- Years active: 2002–present

Mimi Brănescu (Romanian pronunciation: [ˈmimi brəˈnesku]; born 31 March 1974) is a Romanian actor. He appeared in more than twenty films since 2004.

== Biography ==
Born in Lehliu, Călărași County, he studied at the Caragiale National University of Theatre and Film in Bucharest (class of Olga Tudorache), graduating in 2000.

== Selected filmography ==
Year	Title	Role	Notes
2016	Sieranevada		
2015	Tetarti 04:45	The Romanian	Greek film
2013	Child's Pose		
2010	Portrait of the Fighter as a Young Man		
2010	Tuesday, After Christmas	Paul	
2009	Medal of Honor	Cornel	
2008	Boogie		
2007	Alexandra	Cezar	
2006	The Paper Will Be Blue		
2005	The Death of Mr. Lazarescu		
2004	Un cartuș de Kent și un pachet de cafea	The son	
2002	Philanthropy		

== Awards ==
- Gopo Award for best supporting actor (2008).
