= Constantin Popescu (director) =

Romanian film director and screenwriter

- Born: December 15, 1973 (age 52); Romania
- Occupations: Film director, screenwriter
- Years active: 2009–present
- Known for: Tales from the Golden Age (2009); Portrait of the Fighter as a Young Man (2010); Pororoca (2017)
- Awards: Gopo Award for Best Director

Constantin Popescu (born 15 December 1973) is a Romanian film director and screenwriter. He is sometimes credited as Constantin Popescu Jr. and Constantin C. Popescu.

== Life and career ==
Constantin Popescu was one of the directors of the omnibus film Tales from the Golden Age (2009). His first feature film as solo director was Portrait of the Fighter as a Young Man (2010), a historical drama about Romanian anti-communist partisans fighting after World War II. It was followed by the family drama Principles of Life (2010). Popescu's third feature film was Pororoca (2017), a psychological thriller for which he received the Gopo Award for Best Director.

== Selected filmography ==
- Tales from the Golden Age (2009)
- Portrait of the Fighter as a Young Man (2010)
- Principles of Life (2010)
- Pororoca (2017)
