= The Paper Will Be Blue =

Romanian film written and directed by Radu Muntean from 2006

- Theatrical release poster
- Directed by: Radu Muntean
- Written by: Alexandru Baciu; Radu Muntean; Răzvan Rădulescu
- Produced by: Dragoș Potop; Dragoș Vâlcu
- Starring: Dragoș Bucur; Ion Sapdaru; Mimi Brănescu
- Cinematography: Tudor Lucaciu
- Edited by: Andu Radu
- Production company: Multimedia Est
- Distributed by: Transilvania Film
- Release dates: 8 August 2006 (Locarno); 13 October 2006
- Running time: 92 minutes
- Country: Romania
- Language: Romanian
- Budget: €700,000 (estimated)

The Paper Will Be Blue (Romanian: Hârtia va fi albastră) is a 2006 Romanian film written and directed by Radu Muntean. The story is set on the night between 22 and 23 December 1989, the time of the Romanian Revolution. It follows a Militia unit which one man abandons to take part in the revolution, and the other members have to search for him. The film uses subtle humour and was shot in a cinéma vérité style with handheld camera.

The film premiered in competition at the 2006 Locarno International Film Festival. It received two Gopo Awards and was nominated for nine more.

== Plot ==
The film begins with a scene of an armoured personnel carrier (APC) and a military checkpoint in the background. Two men come out of it, one in civilian clothing, the other in a Militia (Miliţia) uniform, and light up cigarettes. Suddenly, the soldiers manning the checkpoint open fire and kill all of the APC's occupants.

The film then cuts to a Militia night patrol in Bucharest. Out of enthusiasm, one of the men, Costi Andronescu, abandons the mission and decides to fight for the cause of the Revolution at the Television building. His CO, Lt. Neagu and the rest of the fireteam search for him during the confusing night of 22 December 1989.

Costi meets a group in a truck on their way to defend the TV station. He is in uniform and greeted as a brother and told "you are a civilian now" and he swaps items of uniform with the other men for civilian clothing. He and an unnamed Gypsy are asked to step down as they need to take an injured soldier to hospital after the truck is flagged down.

Costi and the Gypsy end up in a villa with soldiers and fighters under Army command. The villa is under attack by what are presumed to be forces loyal to the Communist regime and the two men are ordered to defend it. At one point, however, they realize that the "enemy" are also Army soldiers and try to explain the situation to one of the officers at the scene, only to be branded "terrorists" and "Arabs". Costi is found to be partly in uniform, which further aggravates their situation. He receives a mild beating and the two are confined in the cellar. Later a Colonel checks out Costi's bona fides and he is allowed to go. Meanwhile, his CO Lt. Neagu (who treats Costi and his men like sons) has been driving all over the city until he calls at Costi's mother's place where they watch TV, smoke cigarettes and wait for him to turn up, fearing he is dead.

Eventually he turns up, they drive back to base. The film ends with them in the same standoff seen at the beginning, sitting in their APC while regular army soldiers ask them to identify themselves at the checkpoint. The men are unsure what to reply, but decide to give their Militia password several times ("the paper will be blue"). The film ends just before the soldiers start shooting.

== Cast ==
- Paul Ipate as Costi
- Adi Cărăuleanu as Lt. Neagu
- Dragoș Bucur as Dragoş
- Tudor Istodor as Bogdan
- Alexandru Potocean as Vasile
- Andi Vasluianu as Aurel
- Dana Dogaru as Mrs Andronescu
- Ion Sapdaru as Crăciun
- Mimi Brănescu as Lt. Deleanu
- Alexandru Georgescu as Lt. Voinescu

== Production ==
The screenplay is loosely based on an actual incident which received considerable media attention in Romania. The film was produced by Multimedia Est and Antena 1 in collaboration with the Romanian Television Society. It received support from the National Cinematography Centre and financial backing from BV McCann Erickson, Starlink Media and Next Advertising.

== Release ==
The film premiered on 8 August 2006 at the Locarno International Film Festival, where it played in the main competition. It was released in Romania on 13 October 2006, distributed by Transilvania Film. It had 6,475 admissions in Romania which gave 48,614.20 lei in revenues.

== Reception ==
=== Critical response ===
Leslie Felperin of Variety wrote:

Third feature by helmer Radu Muntean (The Fury) adeptly blends docudrama realism and wryly observed humor in a manner comparable to fellow Romanian Cristi Puiu's recent The Death of Mr. Lazarescu and other local films, while offering yet another intimate-scaled, off-center examination of the impact of 1989. ... Characters, who are hard to tell apart at first given grainy, umbral quality of high-def night shoot, gradually blossom into likeable, fully formed personalities. Using largely handheld camera rigs and overlapping sound, pic achieves high degree of naturalism, creating docudrama feel without ever edging into preachiness.

=== Accolades ===
The film received the Gopo Awards for Best Actor in a Supporting Role (Andi Vasluianu) and Best Sound. It was also nominated for Best Feature Film, Directing, Screenplay, Actor in a Supporting Role (Ion Sapdaru), Cinematography, Costume Design, Production Design and twice for the Young Hope Award (Paul Ipate and Tudor Istodor).

== See also ==
- Romanian New Wave
