= Lehliu =

- Commune
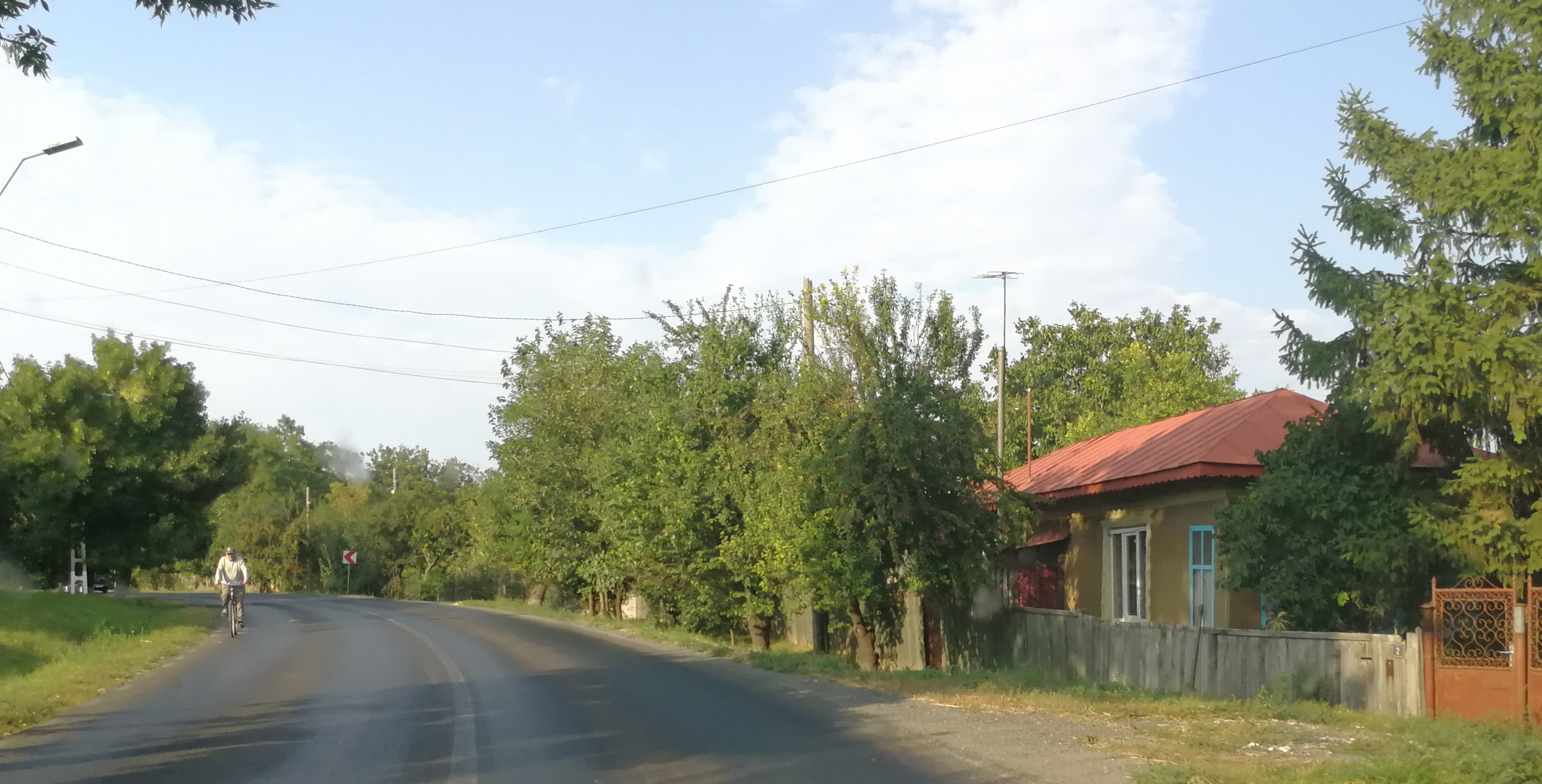
- Lehliu village

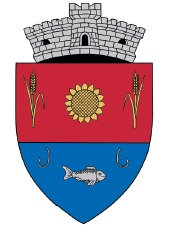
- Coat of arms

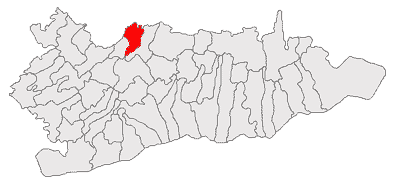
- Location in Călărași County

- Location in Romania
- Coordinates: 44°28′N 26°49′E
- Country: Romania
- County: Călărași

Government
  - Mayor (2024–2028): Ionuț Stan (PNL)
- Area: 56.68 km^{2} (21.88 sq mi)
- Elevation: 56 m (184 ft)
- Population (2021-12-01): 2,437
  - Density: 43.00/km^{2} (111.4/sq mi)
- Time zone: UTC+02:00 (EET)
  - Summer (DST): UTC+03:00 (EEST)
- Postal code: 917150
- Area code: +(40) x42
- Vehicle reg.: CL
- Website: comunalehliu.ro

Lehliu is a commune in Călărași County, Muntenia, Romania. It is composed of two villages, Lehliu and Săpunari. At the 2021 census, Lehliu had a population of 2,437.

The commune lies in the Bărăgan Plain. It is located in the northern part of the county, 6 km (3.7 mi) from the town of Lehliu Gară, on the border with Ialomița County. Lehliu is crossed by the national road DN3; the A2 motorway runs just south of the commune.

Historical population
Year	Pop.	±%
2002	2,985	—
2011	2,730	−8.5%
2021	2,437	−10.7%
Source: Census data

== Natives ==
- Mimi Brănescu (born 1974), actor
- Mircea Minescu (born 1971), footballer
