= Pororoca (film) =

2017 Romanian thriller film

- Directed by: Constantin Popescu
- Written by: Constantin Popescu
- Produced by: Liviu Marghidan; Lissandra Haulica
- Starring: Bogdan Dumitrache; Iulia Lumânare
- Cinematography: Liviu Marghidan
- Edited by: Corina Stavila
- Production companies: Scharf Advertising; Irreverence Films
- Release date: 2017
- Running time: 152 minutes
- Country: Romania
- Language: Romanian

Pororoca is a 2017 Romanian psychological thriller film directed by Constantin Popescu and starring Bogdan Dumitrache and Iulia Lumânare. It is about a family and its struggles when its 5-year-old daughter disappears. The film premiered at the 2017 San Sebastián International Film Festival and was released in Romania on 19 January 2018.

Dumitrache won the Best Actor award at the San Sebastián International Film Festival. Popescu received the Gopo Award for Best Director for the film.
