= André Vieira (footballer, born 1974) =

Brazilian footballer

Personal information
- Full name: André Andrade Vieira
- Date of birth: 31 January 1974 (age 52)
- Place of birth: Porto Alegre, Brazil
- Height: 1.78 m (5 ft 10 in)
- Position: Midfielder

Senior career*
Years	Team	Apps	(Gls)
1994–1997	Grêmio	12	(0)
1997–1998	Lugano		
1999	Paysandu		
1999–2000	Ponta Grossa		
2000	Gama		
2001–2002	Zimbru Chișinău		
2002	Fortaleza		
2003	Oțelul Galați	7	(0)
2003	Chapecoense		
Total		19	(0)
- * Club domestic league appearances and goals

André Andrade Vieira (born 31 January 1974) is a Brazilian former footballer who played as a midfielder.

== Honours ==
Grêmio

- Campeonato Brasileiro Série A: 1996
- Copa do Brasil: 1994, 1997
- Campeonato Gaúcho: 1995, 1996
- Copa Libertadores: 1995
