= Valentin Borș =

Romanian footballer

Valentin Borş
Personal information
- Date of birth: 17 July 1983 (age 43)
- Place of birth: Focşani, Romania
- Height: 1.84 m (6 ft 0 in)
- Position: Goalkeeper

Youth career
- Unirea Focșani

Senior career*
| Years | Team | Apps | (Gls) |
| 2000–2005 | Oțelul Galați | 14 | (0) |
| 2005–2006 | Botoşani | 20 | (0) |
| 2006–2008 | Oțelul Galați | 4 | (0) |
| 2008–2009 | Concordia Chiajna | 0 | (0) |
| 2009–2013 | CSM Focșani | ? | (?) |
| 2014– | Progresul Focșani (futsal) | ? | (?) |
| 2016–2017 | CSM Focșani | ? | (?) |
- * Club domestic league appearances and goals as of 21 January 2018

Valentin Borş (born 17 July 1983 in Focşani, Romania) is a Romanian football player. He is also a futsal player for Progresul Focșani in the Romanian first division.
