= Alexandru Iliuciuc =

Romanian former football player (born 1977)

Personal information
- Full name: Alexandru Ioan Iliuciuc
- Date of birth: 28 August 1977 (age 49)
- Place of birth: Galați, Romania
- Height: 1.79 m (5 ft 10 in)
- Position: Goalkeeper

Team information
- Current team: Mirbat Sports Club

Senior career*
Years	Team	Apps	(Gls)
1994–1995	Constant Galaţi	1	(?)
1995–1996	Dunărea Galați	25	(?)
1997	Ceahlăul Piatra Neamț	3	(0)
1998	Dunărea Galați	24	(0)
1999–2000	Farul Constanța	31	(0)
2000–2001	Poiana Câmpina	27	(0)
2001–2002	Dinamo București	2	(0)
2002	→ Poiana Câmpina (loan)	12	(0)
2002–2003	Oțelul Galați	19	(0)
2003	UTA Arad	7	(0)
2004	Poiana Câmpina	7	(0)
2004–2005	Jiul Petroșani	1	(0)
2005–2006	Gloria Buzău	10	(0)
2006	CF Brăila	11	(0)
2007	Arieșul Turda	6	(0)
2008	FC 1 Decembrie	?	(?)
Total		186	(0)

International career^{‡}
1999	Romania U-21	2	(0)

Managerial career
- 2006: Romania U-17 (assistant)
- 2006–2007: Arieșul Turda (assistant)
- 2008–2010: Najran (assistant)
- 2010: Al-Taawoun (assistant)
- 2011–2012: Ohod Club (assistant)
- 2013–2014: Săgeata Năvodari (assistant)
- 2014–2016: Dhofar Club (assistant)
- 2016–2017: Dhofar Club
- 2017–2018: Buildcon (assistant)
- 2018–2019: Al-Shamal (assistant)
- 2019–2024: Mirbat SC (general coach)
- 2024–: Unirea Brăniștea
- * Club domestic league appearances and goals as of 15 December 2017 ‡ National team caps and goals as of 15 December 2017

Alexandru Ioan Iliuciuc (born 28 August 1977) is a Romanian former football player who played as a goalkeeper and currently the coach of Mirbat Sports Club.

== Degrees ==
- UEFA A
- UEFA B
- Bachelor in Physical Studies and Sport Education from the Faculty of Physical Sport Studies and Education

== Personal life ==
Alex Iliuciuc speaks fluent Romanian and English. He can also understand French and Arabic.
