= Claudiu Stan =

Romanian footballer

Personal information
- Full name: Claudiu Nicușor Stan
- Date of birth: 25 September 2001 (age 25)
- Place of birth: Bucharest, Romania
- Height: 1.77 m (5 ft 10 in)
- Position: Central midfielder

Youth career
- 2013–2021: Dinamo București

Senior career*
Years	Team	Apps	(Gls)
2021–2022	Dinamo București	1	(0)

International career^{‡}
2018	Romania U17	1	(0)
2018	Romania U18	1	(0)
- * Club domestic league appearances and goals as of 20 December 2020 ‡ National team caps and goals as of 6 September 2018

Claudiu Nicușor Stan (born 25 September 2001) is a Romanian professional footballer who plays as a central midfielder.

== Club career ==
=== Dinamo București ===
He made his Liga I debut for Dinamo București against FC Farul Constanța on 20 December 2021.

== Career statistics ==
=== Club ===
As of match played 20 December 2021

Appearances and goals by club, season and competition
Club	Season	League			National Cup (Note: Includes Cupa României)		Europe		Other (Note: Appearances in Supercupa României)		Total	
Club	Season	Division	Apps	Goals	Apps	Goals	Apps	Goals	Apps	Goals	Apps	Goals
Dinamo București	2021–22	Liga I	1	0	0	0	0	0	0	0	1	0
Career Total			1	0	0	0	0	0	0	0	1	0
