= Cornel Cornea =

Romanian footballer

Personal information
- Full name: Cornel Flaviu Cornea
- Date of birth: 28 July 1981 (age 45)
- Place of birth: Beclean, Romania
- Height: 1.79 m (5 ft 10 1/2 in)
- Positions: Right midfielder; right back

Youth career
- Laminorul Beclean

Senior career*
Years	Team	Apps	(Gls)
1999–2000	Laminorul Beclean	?	(?)
2000–2002	Baia Mare	31	(6)
2002–2003	Oțelul Galați	28	(3)
2003–2005	Gloria Bistriţa	38	(5)
2003–2005	→ Gloria II Bistriţa	8	(1)
2006–2007	FC Vaslui	20	(0)
2007–2008	Botoşani	25	(8)
2008	Delta Tulcea	12	(0)
2009	OFI	6	(0)
2009	Astra Ploieşti	4	(0)
2010	Baia Mare	11	(1)
2010	Politehnica Iași	10	(0)
2011	Zimbru Chișinău	4	(0)
2011–2012	Unirea Alba Iulia	9	(1)
2012	Rapid CFR Suceava	?	(?)
2012	FC Cisnădie	?	(?)
2012–2013	FCMU Baia Mare	11	(0)
2013	Știința Miroslava	?	(?)
2013–2014	Unirea Dej	?	(?)
2014–2016	F.C. Romania	?	(?)
2016–2017	Wingate & Finchley	?	(?)
Total		217+	(25+)
- * Club domestic league appearances and goals as of 7 March 2018

Cornel Flaviu Cornea (born 28 July 1981) is a Romanian former professional football player. His first match in Liga I was against FCM Bacău, when he was playing at Gloria Bistriţa. Cornea started his career in his hometown, Beclean, at Laminorul and throughout his career he played for several teams in the top three leagues of Romanian football such as: Baia Mare, Oțelul Galați, Gloria Bistriţa, FC Vaslui, Botoşani, Astra Ploieşti and Unirea Alba Iulia among others. He also played 4 matches for the Moldovan side Zimbru Chișinău and from 2014 he moved to England where he played for F.C. Romania and Wingate & Finchley.
