= Sorin Iodi =

Romanian footballer

Personal information
- Full name: Sorin Adrian Iodi
- Date of birth: 12 June 1976 (age 50)
- Place of birth: Sighetu Marmaţiei, Romania
- Height: 1.80 m (5 ft 11 in)
- Position: Centre back

Senior career*
Years	Team	Apps	(Gls)
1995–1999	Olimpia Satu Mare	113	(5)
1999	Gloria Bistriţa	14	(0)
2000–2003	Dinamo București	21	(0)
2000–2001	Oțelul Galați	10	(0)
2001	→ FCM Câmpina (loan)	13	(0)
2002–2003	→ Naţional București (loan)	15	(1)
2004–2005	Gloria Bistriţa	36	(1)
2005–2007	Universitatea Cluj	11	(0)
2008	Otopeni	10	(0)
2008–2009	Baia Mare	8	(0)
2009–2011	Gloria Bistriţa	11	(0)
Total		262	(7)
Medal record
Dinamo București
Runner-up	Cupa României	2002
- * Club domestic league appearances and goals as of 1 January 2016

Sorin Adrian Iodi (born 12 June 1976 in Sighetu Marmaţiei) is a Romanian former football player.

== Club career ==
Iodi started his football career at Olimpia Satu Mare.

He played 113 matches for this team and scored 5 goals. In 1999, he was transferred to Gloria Bistriţa. Iodi played just half of a season at Gloria and he was sold to Dinamo București with whom he won the champion title in the 1999–2000 season.

In 2001, he was sent to Poiana Câmpina, which was at that time Dinamo's satellite team. He returned to Dinamo București in 2002. Iodi played 11 matches and he was loaned to FC Naţional București.

In 2003, he played one match for Dinamo, team which became champion in the 2003–2004 season, and was transferred to Gloria Bistriţa. where he played until 2005, when he moved to the Liga II team, U Cluj. In the 2006–2007 season Sorin Iodi promoted with his team in Liga I. Since then he played for CS Otopeni but became free agent in the summer of 2008.

Between August 2009 and 2011 he played for Gloria Bistriţa, until his retirement.
