= Romulus Miclea =

Romanian footballer

Personal information
- Full name: Romulus Daniel Miclea
- Date of birth: 5 April 1980 (age 46)
- Place of birth: Târgu Mureș, Romania
- Height: 1.77 m (5 ft 9 1/2 in)
- Position: Right winger

Senior career*
Years	Team	Apps	(Gls)
1998–2001	ASA Târgu Mureș	48	(7)
2001–2002	CSM Reșița	23	(1)
2002–2004	Universitatea Craiova	34	(2)
2004–2010	Politehnica Iași	125	(24)
2010–2012	Gaz Metan Mediaș	16	(0)
2012	→ Voința Sibiu (loan)	8	(1)
2012–2014	Târgu Mureș	17	(0)
2021–2022	ASA Târgu Mureș	1	(0)

Managerial career
- 2014–2021: Juvenes Târgu Mureș (youth)
- 2021–2022: ASA Târgu Mureș (assistant)
- * Club domestic league appearances and goals as of 14:13, 11 January 2022 (UTC)

Romulus Daniel Miclea (born 5 April 1980 in Târgu Mureș) is a Romanian football player who plays as a right winger for ASA Târgu Mureș.
