= Mircea Minescu =

Romanian footballer

Personal information
- Date of birth: 17 June 1971 (age 55)
- Place of birth: Lehliu, Romania
- Position: Defender

Senior career*
Years	Team	Apps	(Gls)
1994–1997	Dacia Unirea Brăila	97	(2)
1997–1999	Foresta Suceava	56	(1)
1999–2000	Rocar București	29	(0)
2001–2002	Foresta Suceava	44	(0)
2002–2003	Oțelul Galați	21	(0)
2003–2005	FC Ghimbav		
Total		247	(3)
- * Club domestic league appearances and goals

Mircea Minescu (born 17 June 1971) is a Romanian former football defender.

== Honours ==
FC Ghimbav

- Divizia C: 2003–04
