= André Vieira =

Portuguese footballer

Personal information
- Full name: André Filipe Silva Rocha Vieira
- Date of birth: 13 September 1992 (age 34)
- Place of birth: Faro, Portugal
- Height: 1.88 m (6 ft 2 in)
- Position: Midfielder

Team information
- Current team: União Santarém
- Number: 8

Youth career
- 2002–2008: Internacional Almancil
- 2008–2009: Futsal
- 2009–2011: Internacional Almancil

Senior career*
Years	Team	Apps	(Gls)
2011–2012	Faro e Benfica		
2012–2013	Moncarapachense		
2013–2014	Ferreiras	30	(3)
2014–2015	Louletano	30	(3)
2015–2016	Operário	26	(0)
2016–2020	Farense	96	(13)
2020–2021	Varzim	29	(1)
2022	Saigon	9	(3)
2022–2023	PASA Irodotos	0	(0)
2023	Amora	13	(0)
2024–2025	FC 11 Esperanças	17	(2)
2025–	União Santarém	8	(0)
- * Club domestic league appearances and goals as of 25 June 2025

André Filipe Silva Rocha Vieira (born 13 September 1992) is a Portuguese professional footballer who plays as a midfielder for União Santarém.

== Football career ==
Born in Faro in the Algarve, Vieira began his career with several lower-level clubs in his native region. In 2016, after a year with CD Operário in the Azores, he joined his hometown's S.C. Farense in the third tier. He was part of the team that won promotion as runners-up in 2017–18, scoring three times in the 4–1 aggregate playoff semi-final win over U.D. Vilafranquense in May.

On 21 July 2018, Vieira made his professional debut in a 2018–19 Taça da Liga first round match against Penafiel; he was substituted before the team won on penalties after a goalless draw. He scored three times in his first professional league season, including two on 14 April 2019 in a 3–1 home win over G.D. Estoril Praia having come on as a substitute with four minutes left.

In August 2019, Vieira had successful surgery to cure an oncological problem. Having played just 13 games in all competitions, scoring once, as Farense won promotion to the Primeira Liga in 2019–20, he remained in the second tier with Varzim S.C. when he signed a contract of undisclosed length on 29 June 2020.
