= Boldești-Scăeni =

- Town
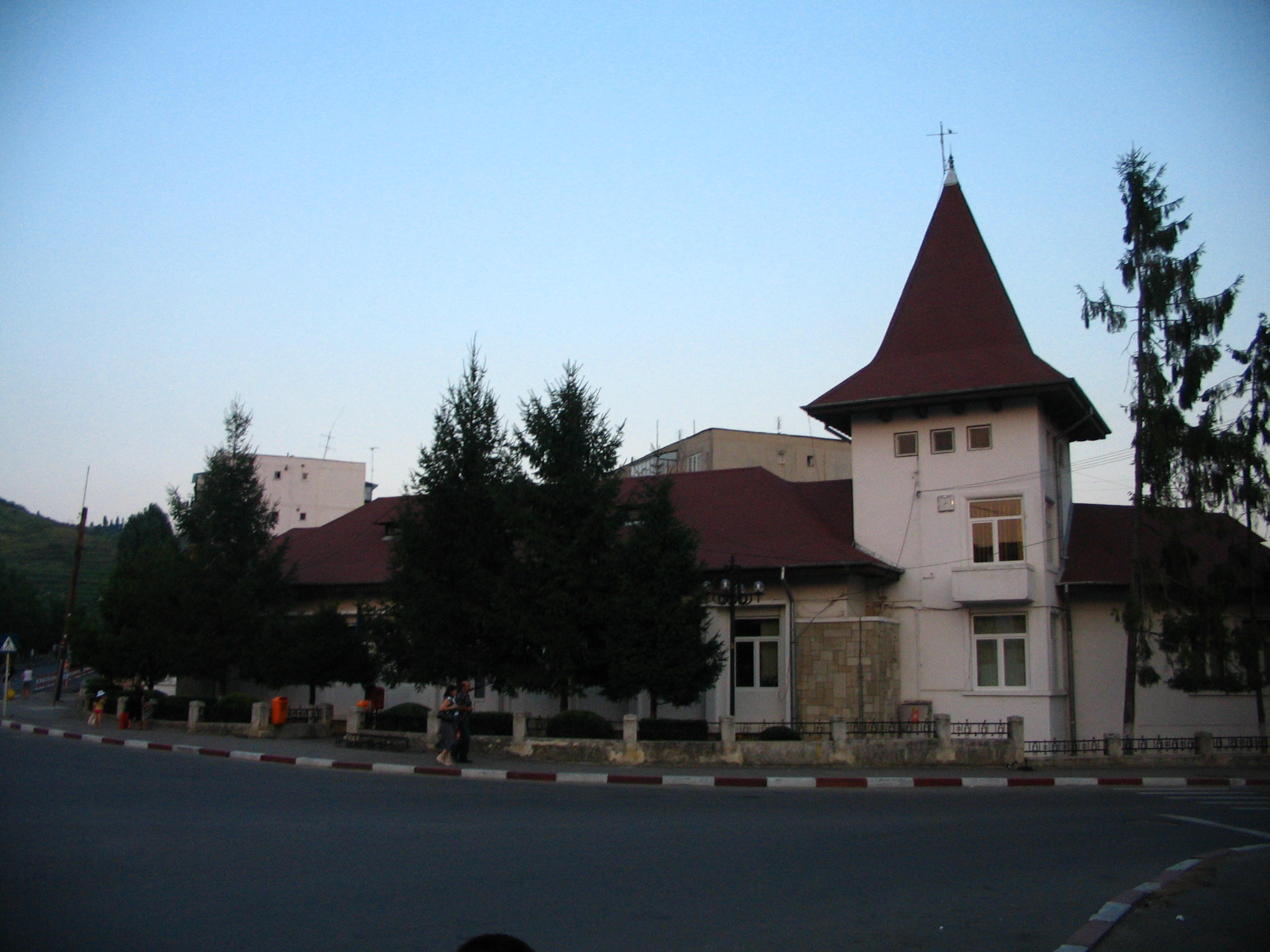
- Former Boldești-Scăeni town hall

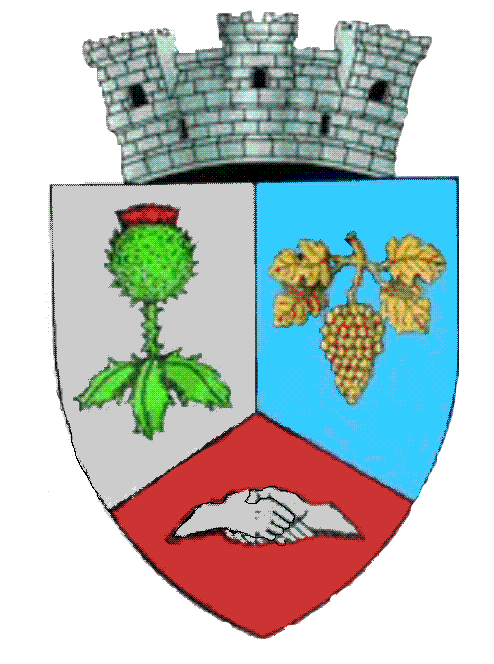
- Coat of arms

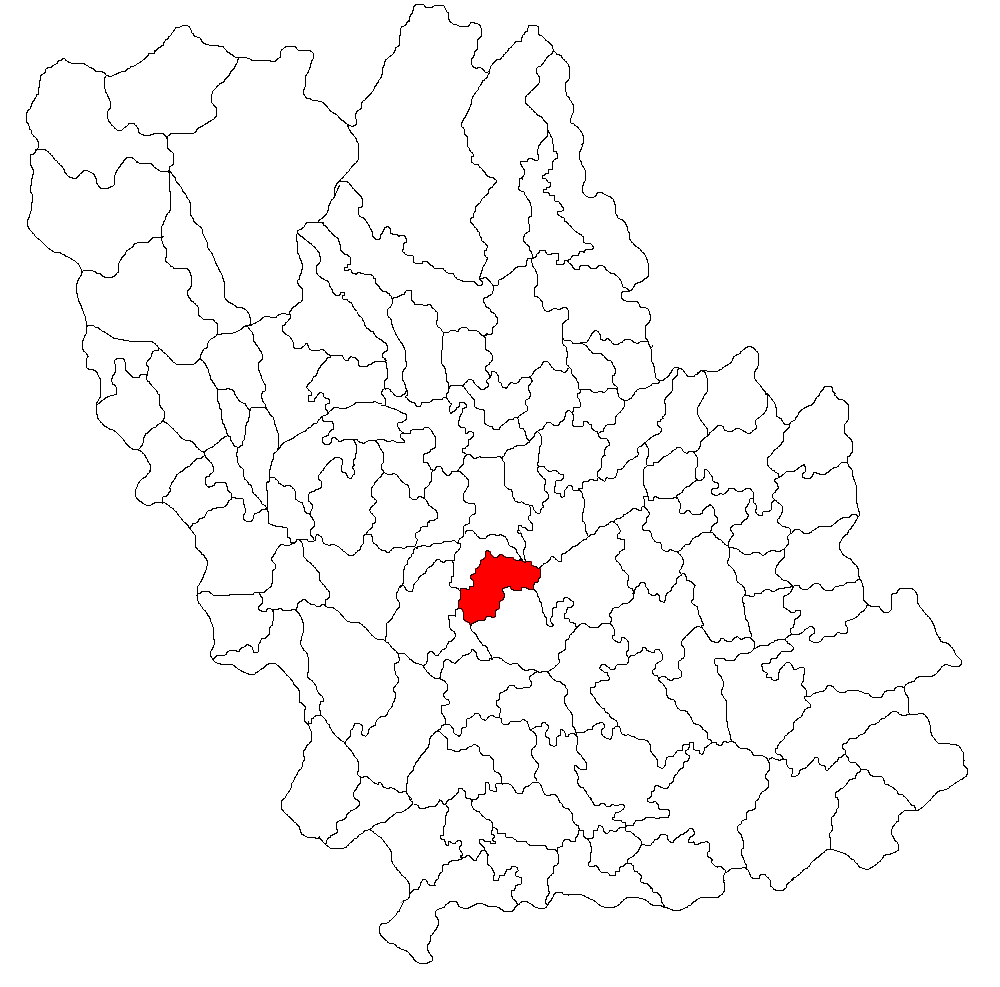
- Location in Prahova County

- Location in Romania
- Coordinates: 45°1′48″N 26°1′48″E
- Country: Romania
- County: Prahova

Government
  - Mayor (2024–2028): Florin-Ionuț Dincă (PNL)
- Area: 34.90 km^{2} (13.47 sq mi)
- Elevation: 210 m (690 ft)
- Population (2021-12-01): 10,298
  - Density: 295.1/km^{2} (764.2/sq mi)
- Time zone: UTC+02:00 (EET)
  - Summer (DST): UTC+03:00 (EEST)
- Postal code: 105300
- Area code: (+40) 02 44
- Vehicle reg.: PH
- Website: pbs.infoprimarie.ro

Boldești-Scăeni (Romanian pronunciation: [bolˈdeʃtʲ skəˈjenʲ]), often spelled Boldești-Scăieni, is a town in Prahova County, southern Romania. Located about 15 km (9.3 mi) north of Ploiești, it is an important oil-extraction center. It is situated in the historical region of Muntenia.

== History ==
Historical population
Year	Pop.	±%
1977	9,681	—
1992	11,757	+21.4%
2002	11,505	−2.1%
2011	11,137	−3.2%
2021	10,298	−7.5%
Source: Census data

The town was created in 1968 by the unification of two neighbouring communes, Boldești and Scăeni. One village, Seciu, is administered by the town.

=== The phalanstère ===
Scăeni was the location of the only attempt to create a Charles Fourier-type phalanstère in Romania. In 1835, Theodor Diamant, a utopian socialist who had met Fourier in Paris, created the phalanstère, named The Agronomy and Manufacturing Society, on a patch of land provided by Emanoil Bălăceanu, a local land-owner. The Wallachian authorities saw this enterprise as a threat and took a stand against it. Therefore, the phalanstère was disbanded in 1836, a year and a half after it came into existence, with Diamant and Bălăceanu sent into exile.

=== World War II ===
During World War II, the area was extensively bombed, as part of Operation Tidal Wave. Air-raid shelters can still be found on the wooded hills around Boldești.

== Coat of arms ==
The coat of arms of Boldești-Scăeni depicts a thistle (in Romanian, scai or scaiete) which refers to the name of the old Scăeni commune, as well as a grape, which represents the vineyards on the Seciu hills. The shaking hands is a reminder of the 19th century Scăieni phalanstère experiment, but could also refer to the 1968 union of the Boldești and Scăieni communes.

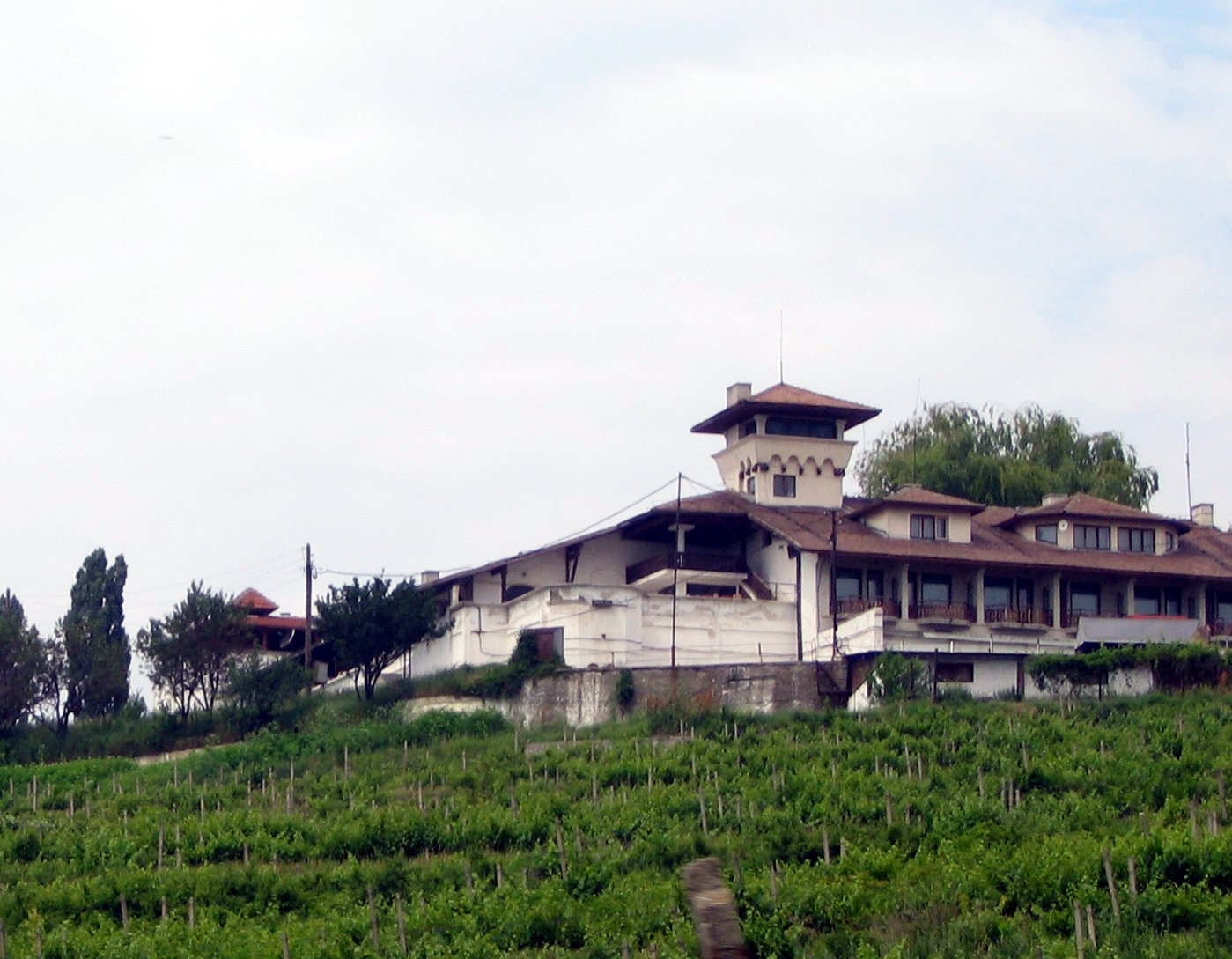
The "Crama Seciu" restaurant in Boldești-Scăeni, surrounded by vineyards

== Climate ==
Boldești-Scăeni has a humid continental climate (Cfb in the Köppen climate classification).

Climate data for Boldești-Scăeni
Month	Jan	Feb	Mar	Apr	May	Jun	Jul	Aug	Sep	Oct	Nov	Dec	Year
Mean daily maximum °C (°F)	2.7 (36.9)	5.4 (41.7)	10.4 (50.7)	15.9 (60.6)	21 (70)	24.6 (76.3)	26.8 (80.2)	27 (81)	21.7 (71.1)	15.6 (60.1)	9.8 (49.6)	4.6 (40.3)	15.5 (59.9)
Daily mean °C (°F)	−1.6 (29.1)	0.5 (32.9)	5 (41)	10.6 (51.1)	15.9 (60.6)	19.9 (67.8)	22 (72)	22 (72)	16.7 (62.1)	10.7 (51.3)	5.5 (41.9)	0.3 (32.5)	10.6 (51.2)
Mean daily minimum °C (°F)	−5.4 (22.3)	−3.8 (25.2)	−0.5 (31.1)	4.5 (40.1)	9.8 (49.6)	14 (57)	16.1 (61.0)	16.2 (61.2)	11.5 (52.7)	6 (43)	1.8 (35.2)	−3 (27)	5.6 (42.1)
Average precipitation mm (inches)	45 (1.8)	41 (1.6)	52 (2.0)	65 (2.6)	83 (3.3)	88 (3.5)	75 (3.0)	50 (2.0)	59 (2.3)	59 (2.3)	53 (2.1)	54 (2.1)	724 (28.6)
Source: https://en.climate-data.org/europe/romania/prahova/boldesti-scaeni-15552/

== Economy ==
The town's economy revolves around oil-extraction as well as winemaking. Almost half of the town's surface is cultivated with vine. The Seciu winecellars are located in the direct vicinity of Boldești.

Industry developed in the town after 1968, with a glass factory open in Scăeni. Many people who live in Boldești-Scăeni also work in the neighbouring city of Ploiești.

== Trivia and Historical monuments ==
The utopian experiment by Theodor Diamant was featured in the movie "Falansterul" ("The Phalanstere"), directed by Savel Stiopul in 1979. Historical monuments in the city Boldești-Scăeni includes 6 historic monuments (3 in Seciu and 3 in the city itself), plus 3 new modern statues sculpted by Cristian Petru Balan from the United States. They are "Glass Breaker", a stainless steel statue, 6 m high, built in 2010, a single replica of the Statue of Liberty in New York City, worked in fiberglass reinforced concrete (5 m from ground) and statuary group "Mihai Eminescu and Veronica Micle" in front of the Culture House "Mihai Eminescu", two busts on a common base (2.5 m), all molded fiberglass and reinforced concrete. Last two monuments were erected in July 2014. Since ancient monuments only one is classified as a monument of national importance, that being "Casa Rusescu" in Seciu, built in 1826.

== Natives ==
- Valeriu Răchită (born 1970), football player
- Cristian Vlad (born 1977), football player
