= Adrian Dragoș Iordache =

Romanian footballer (born 1981)

Adrian Iordache
Personal information
- Full name: Adrian Dragoş Iordache
- Date of birth: 13 November 1981 (age 44)
- Place of birth: Piteşti, Romania
- Height: 1.80 m (5 ft 11 in)
- Position: Striker

Senior career*
Years	Team	Apps	(Gls)
2001–2003	Argeş Piteşti	37	(7)
2003–2005	Energie Cottbus	61	(7)
2005	Levadiakos	5	(0)
2006	Sacramento Knights		
2006–2010	Argeş Piteşti	75	(16)
2010	Pandurii Târgu Jiu	10	(0)
2011	CS Otopeni	10	(1)
- * Club domestic league appearances and goals

Adrian Iordache (born 13 November 1981) is a retired Romanian football striker. He made 89 appearances in Liga I and also played in the top division in Greece and in second division in Germany.

== Honours ==
FC Argeş Piteşti

- Romanian Second League: 2007–08
