= Cristian Vlad =

Romanian footballer

Personal information
- Full name: Cristian Nicolae Vlad
- Date of birth: 18 February 1977 (age 49)
- Place of birth: Boldești-Scăeni, Romania
- Height: 1.82 m (5 ft 11 1/2 in)
- Position: Midfielder

Youth career
- Petrolul Ploiești

Senior career*
Years	Team	Apps	(Gls)
1994–1996	Petrolistul Boldești		
1996–1999	Petrolul Ploiești	60	(7)
2000	Dinamo București	14	(1)
2001	Oțelul Galați	14	(1)
2001–2003	Argeș Pitești	31	(1)
2003	Inter Gaz București	13	(3)
2004	Gloria Bistrița	18	(1)
2005	Ceahlăul Piatra Neamț	10	(2)
2005–2007	Unirea Urziceni	42	(4)
2007	→ Ayia Napa (loan)	8	(0)
2007–2009	CSM Ploiești (Note: The statistics for the 2007–08 Liga III season are unavailable.)	12	(3)
2009–2011	Petrolul Ploiești	51	(8)
2017	Petrolul Ploiești	1	(0)
Total		274	(31)

International career
1999	Romania U21	3	(0)
- * Club domestic league appearances and goals as of 25 February 2018

Cristian Nicolae Vlad (born 18 February 1977 in Boldești-Scăeni, Prahova County) is a retired Romanian football player who played as a midfielder.

== Club career ==
Vlad was born on 18 February 1977 in Boldești-Scăeni, Romania and began playing junior-level football at Petrolul Ploiești. In 1994, he went to play for his hometown club Petrolistul Boldești in Divizia C. Two years later, he came back to Petrolul, making his Divizia A debut on 17 May 1997 under coach Ioan Andone in a 4–2 home win over FC Brașov. In 1999, he scored a goal in a spectacular 5–1 victory against Steaua București.

In the middle of the 1999–2000 season, Vlad joined Dinamo București. Until the end of the season, he made 12 league appearances and scored one goal under coach Cornel Dinu as the team won The Double. Subsequently, he went to play for Oțelul Galați, before moving to Argeș Pitești. In 2003, Vlad played half a year for Divizia B club Inter Gaz București, returning afterwards to first league football, as he signed with Gloria Bistrița. There, he played in a 2–0 away loss to FC Thun in the 2004 Intertoto Cup.

In 2005, Vlad went to play in the second league, first for Ceahlăul Piatra Neamț and then for Unirea Urziceni, helping the latter earn promotion to the first league. On 10 December 2006, Vlad made his last Divizia A appearance in Unirea's 0–0 draw against CFR Cluj, totaling 152 matches with 11 goals in the competition. In 2007, Unirea loaned him to Cypriot First Division club Ayia Napa, where he was a teammate of compatriot Tiberiu Lung. Subsequently, Vlad joined third-tier club CSM Ploiești, which he helped gain promotion to the second league under coach Valeriu Răchită at the end of the 2007–08 season. In 2009, Vlad returned to Petrolul, where he was coached once again by Răchită, managing to gain first-league promotion at the end of the 2010–11 season, retiring afterwards.

== International career ==
In 1999, Vlad played three matches for Romania's under-21 team.

== Executive career ==
After he ended his playing career, Vlad worked as Petrolul Ploiești's president between 2016 and 2019, a period in which the club managed two consecutive promotions from the fourth league to the third and then from the third to the second.

== Honours ==
Dinamo București

- Divizia A: 1999–2000
- Cupa României: 1999–2000

CSM Ploiești

- Liga III: 2007–08

Petrolul Ploieşti

- Liga II: 2010–11
