= Portrait of the Fighter as a Young Man =

- Film poster
- Directed by: Constantin Popescu
- Written by: Constantin Popescu
- Starring: Constantin Diță
- Release date: February 13, 2010 (Berlinale)
- Running time: 163 minutes
- Country: Romania
- Language: Romanian

Portrait of the Fighter as a Young Man (Romanian: Portretul luptătorului la tinerețe) is a 2010 Romanian drama film directed by Constantin Popescu It was released at the 60th Berlin International Film Festival.

== Plot ==
The film is the first part of a trilogy which describes the fight of the Romanian anticommunist resistance in the 50s. This first movie is centered on the figure of Ion Gavrilă Ogoranu, a member of the fascist and anti-Semitic Iron Guard, played by Constantin Diță.

In April 2010, the movie received the Public Award and the Image Award (Liviu Marghidan) at B-EST Film Festival in Bucharest.

The film was released in Romania on 18 November 2010.

== Cast ==
- Constantin Diță
- Alexandru Potocean
- Răzvan Vasilescu
- Mimi Brănescu
- Teodor Corban
- Mihai Constantin
- Bogdan Dumitrache
- Mimi Brănescu
- Dan Bordeieanu
- Cătălin Babliuc
- Constantin Lupescu
- Nicodim Ungureanu
- Ingrid Bisu
- Alin Mihalache
- Radu Iacoban
- Mihai Bendeac
