= Adrian Pitu =

Romanian footballer

Personal information
- Full name: Dragoș Adrian Pitu
- Date of birth: 31 August 1975 (age 51)
- Place of birth: Constanța, Romania
- Height: 1.79 m (5 ft 10 in)
- Position: Attacking midfielder

Senior career*
Years	Team	Apps	(Gls)
1994	Farul Constanța	1	(1)
1994–1995	Portul Constanța	14	(0)
1995	Sportul Studențesc	5	(0)
1995–1996	Portul Constanța	13	(1)
1996–1997	Sportul Studențesc	23	(2)
1997	Dinamo București	4	(0)
1997–2000	Rocar București	66	(13)
2000	Universitatea Craiova	11	(0)
2000–2001	Oțelul Galați	15	(3)
2001–2003	FCM Bacău	49	(2)
2003–2004	Steaua București	24	(3)
2004–2005	Național București	3	(0)
2005–2006	Bnei Sakhnin	27	(4)
2006–2007	Maccabi Netanya	3	(0)
2007–2008	Săgeata Stejaru		
Total		258	(29)
- * Club domestic league appearances and goals

Dragoș Adrian Pitu (born 31 August 1975 in Constanța) is a retired Romanian football player. His nephew, Alexi is also a footballer. Adrian Pitu is of Aromanian origins.
