= Oțelul Stadium (1982) =

Stadium in Galaţi, Romania

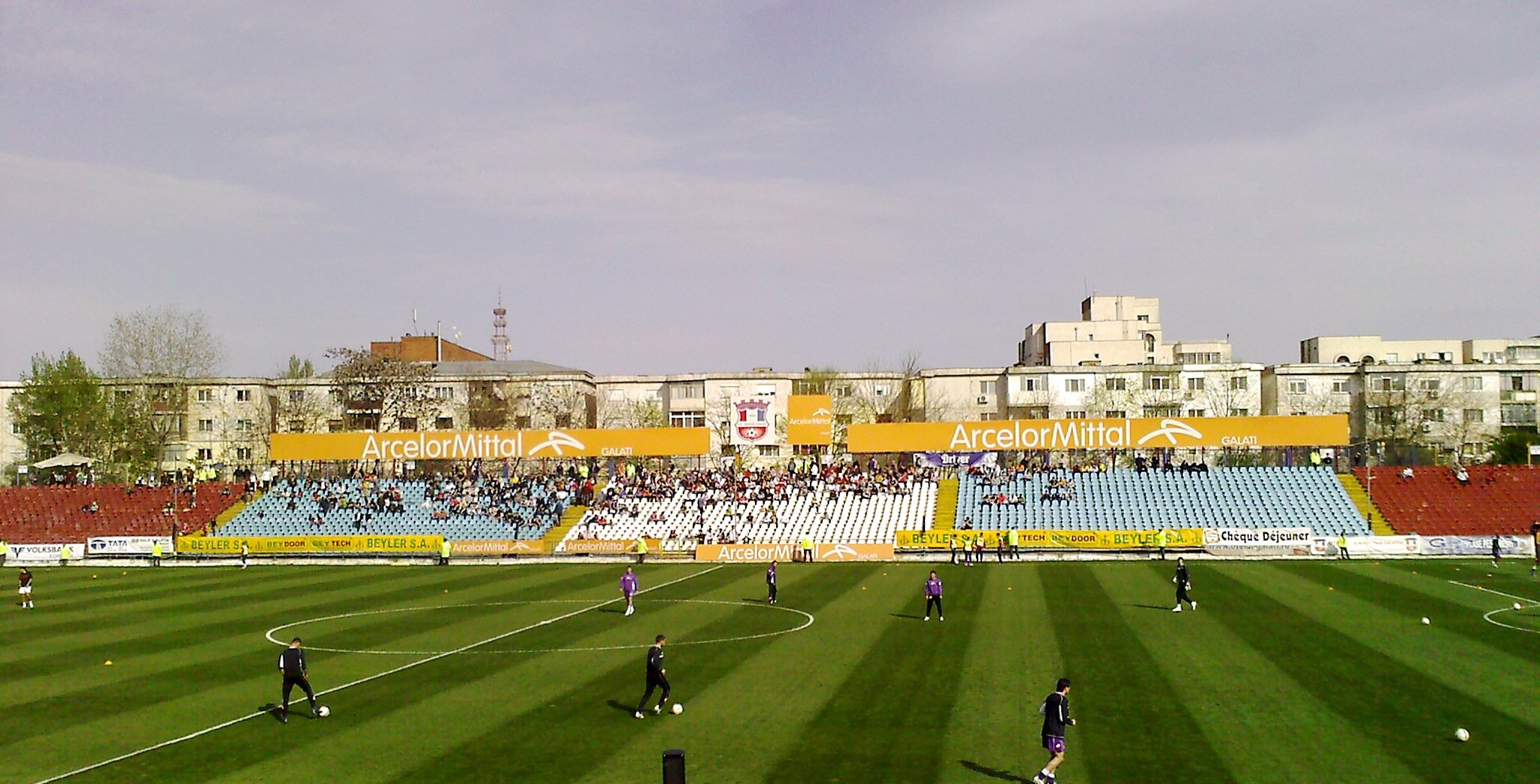
- Interactive map of Oțelul Stadium
- Address: Str. Anghel Saligny, nr. 2, Țiglina III
- Location: Galați, Romania
- Coordinates: 45°25′49″N 28°01′21″E
- Owner: Liberty Galați
- Operator: Oțelul Galați
- Capacity: 13,932 seated
- Surface: Grass
- Scoreboard: LED Display
- Record attendance: 22,000 (Oțelul vs Sportul) (4 December 1985)

Construction
- Built: 1979-1982
- Opened: 30 March 1982
- Renovated: 2005, 2011

Tenant
- Oțelul Galați (1982–2004, 2006–present)

Oțelul Stadium is a stadium in Galaţi, Romania. It is currently used mostly for football matches and is the home ground of Oţelul Galaţi.
