= Dănuț Oprea =

Romanian footballer

Personal information
- Full name: Dănuț Stelian Oprea
- Date of birth: 2 September 1972 (age 54)
- Place of birth: Galați, Romania
- Height: 1.75 m (5 ft 9 in)
- Position: Striker

Senior career*
Years	Team	Apps	(Gls)
1988–1996	Oţelul Galaţi	39	(2)
1993–1994	→ Gloria CFR Galaţi (loan)		
1995–1996	→ Constant Galaţi (loan)	15	(3)
1996	Győri ETO	3	(0)
1996–1997	CF Brăila	27	(4)
1997	Farul Constanța	10	(1)
1998	FC Oneşti	29	(9)
1999–2000	Oțelul Galați	41	(9)
2000–2001	BFC Dynamo	32	(6)
2002–2005	Oțelul Galați	91	(11)
2006–2007	Dunărea Galaţi	27	(5)
Total		314	(50)

Managerial career
- 2012: Moldova U-19
- 2012–2013: Veris Chișinău
- 2015–2017: Moldova U-21
- * Club domestic league appearances and goals as of 13 August 2015

Dănuț Stelian Oprea (born 2 September 1972) is a retired Romanian football player.
