= Eugen Baștină =

Romanian footballer and coach

Personal information
- Full name: Daniel Eugen Baștină
- Date of birth: 27 January 1973 (age 53)
- Place of birth: Ploiești, Romania
- Height: 1.79 m (5 ft 10 in)
- Position: Central midfielder

Senior career*
Years	Team	Apps	(Gls)
1993–1998	Petrolul Ploiești	127	(7)
1999–2002	Oțelul Galați	105	(7)
2002–2004	Zimbru Chișinău	44	(4)
2004–2005	FC U Craiova	2	(0)
Total		278	(18)

Managerial career
- 2008–2009: Fulgerul Smulți
- 2012: Dunărea Galați
- 2016–2018: Oțelul Galați (assistant)
- * Club domestic league appearances and goals

Eugen Baştină (born 27 January 1973) is a Romanian football coach and former player. As a player, he made his debut as a player in Liga I on 30 March 1994 in a game between Farul Constanța and Petrolul Ploiești finished 0–0. Between January and September 2012, he was the manager of Liga II team Dunărea Galați.

== Honours ==
Zimbru Chişinău

- Moldovan Cup: 2002–03
