= Costel Mozacu =

Romanian footballer

Personal information
- Full name: Costel Ciprian Mozacu
- Date of birth: 30 September 1976 (age 50)
- Place of birth: Plopii-Slăvitești, Romania
- Height: 1.78 m (5 ft 10 in)
- Position: Midfielder

Senior career*
Years	Team	Apps	(Gls)
1994–1996	Steaua București	1	(0)
1996	→ Steaua Mizil (loan)	11	(0)
1996–1997	Tractorul Brașov	2	(0)
1997–1999	Olimpia Satu Mare	38	(6)
1999–2001	Oțelul Galați	38	(6)
2000–2001	Petrolul Ploieşti	8	(0)
2001–2003	Oțelul Galați	28	(0)
2003–2004	FC Brașov	13	(0)
2004–2005	Oţelul Galaţi	21	(0)
2005–2006	FC Naţional București	7	(0)
2006–2008	Aris Limassol	37	(1)
2008–2009	Concordia Chiajna	34	(4)
Total		238	(17)
- * Club domestic league appearances and goals

Costel Ciprian Mozacu (born 30 September 1976 in Plopii-Slăvitești, Romania) is a Romanian football midfielder who played with Aris Limassol in Cyprus. His former teams are: Steaua Mizil, Tractorul Brașov, Olimpia Satu Mare, Oțelul Galați, Petrolul Ploieşti, Steaua București and FC Naţional București, Concordia Chiajna.
