= Adrian Toma =

Romanian football player and manager

Personal information
- Date of birth: 5 January 1976 (age 50)
- Place of birth: Focșani, Romania
- Height: 1.70 m (5 ft 7 in)
- Position: Right back

Senior career*
Years	Team	Apps	(Gls)
1998–2000	Diplomatic Focşani	18	(5)
2000–2004	Oțelul Galați	97	(2)
2004–2008	Politehnica Iaşi	74	(1)
2008–2012	CSM Focșani		

Managerial career
- 2011–2012: Focșani
- 2012–: Galactic Focșani (youth)
- 2016–2019: Focșani (assistant)
- 2019–2022: Focșani (head of youth)
- 2022–2023: Focșani
- * Club domestic league appearances and goals

Adrian Toma (born 5 January 1976 in Focşani, Vrancea, Romania) is a former Romanian football player. He is currently the manager of Galactic Focșani, a youth football academy.
