= Bogdan Andone =

Romanian footballer and manager

Personal information
- Full name: Bogdan Ioan Andone
- Date of birth: 7 January 1975 (age 51)
- Place of birth: Aiud, Romania
- Height: 1.79 m (5 ft 10 in)
- Position: Midfielder

Team information
- Current team: Argeș Pitești (head coach)

Youth career
- –1991: Corvinul Hunedoara

Senior career*
Years	Team	Apps	(Gls)
1992	Corvinul Hunedoara	2	(0)
1992–1996	Sportul Studențesc	68	(13)
1994	→ FC Brașov (loan)	7	(0)
1997–1999	Rapid București	45	(4)
1998	→ Farul Constanța (loan)	17	(3)
2000–2002	Oțelul Galați	62	(14)
2002–2003	Ferencváros	7	(0)
2003–2008	Apollon Limassol	120	(9)
2008	Alki Larnaca	4	(0)
2009	Ermis Aradippou		
2009–2010	Farul Constanța	23	(0)
Total		355	(43)

Managerial career
- 2010–2011: Rapid București (assistant)
- 2011–2012: Voluntari
- 2012: Universitatea Cluj (assistant)
- 2012–2013: Al-Shaab (assistant)
- 2014–2015: Concordia Chiajna (assistant)
- 2015–2016: Astra Giurgiu (assistant)
- 2016–2017: Olimpia Satu Mare
- 2017–2018: ASU Politehnica Timișoara
- 2018: Metaloglobus București
- 2018–2019: Energeticianul
- 2019: FCSB (assistant)
- 2019: FCSB
- 2019–2020: Astra Giurgiu
- 2020–2021: Voluntari
- 2022: ASU Politehnica Timișoara
- 2023: Apollon Limassol
- 2023–2024: Botoșani
- 2024–: Argeș Pitești
- * Club domestic league appearances and goals

Bogdan Ioan Andone (born 7 January 1975) is a Romanian professional football manager and former player, currently in charge of Liga I club Argeș Pitești.

== Playing career ==
After spending most of his career in the Romanian first division, Andone then moved to Hungary and Cyprus. He played for many clubs, including FC Brașov, Rapid, Farul Constanța, Oțelul Galați, Ferencvárosi TC, Apollon Limassol and Alki Larnaca.

== Coaching career ==
=== FCSB ===
On 5 June 2019, Andone was appointed as the new head coach of Liga I powerhouse FCSB.He resigned from his position on 1 August after a 2–3 defeat against Armenian side FC Alashkert in the Europa League second qualifying round.

=== Astra Giurgiu ===
On 10 October 2019, Andone was appointed as the new head coach of Liga I club Astra Giurgiu.

== Managerial statistics ==
As of match played 6 November 2026

Team	From	To	Record							
Team	From	To	G	W	D	L	GF	GA	GD	Win %
(Romania) Voluntari	19 August 2011	1 June 2012	30	13	5	12	37	36	+1	43.33
(Romania) Olimpia Satu Mare	28 July 2016	13 June 2017	37	18	6	13	70	38	+32	48.65
(Romania) ASU Politehnica Timișoara	14 June 2017	14 March 2018	26	13	4	9	38	28	+10	50.00
(Romania) Metaloglobus București	20 July 2018	8 October 2018	11	4	2	5	10	18	−8	36.36
(Romania) Energeticianul	11 October 2018	10 January 2019	10	3	3	4	12	11	+1	30.00
(Romania) FCSB	5 June 2019	2 August 2019	7	4	1	2	13	9	+4	57.14
(Romania) Astra Giurgiu	9 October 2019	30 September 2020	21	5	6	10	26	36	−10	23.81
(Romania) Voluntari	30 December 2020	7 May 2021	21	6	6	9	15	22	−7	28.57
(Romania) ASU Politehnica Timișoara	21 June 2022	23 September 2022	8	1	2	5	3	11	−8	12.50
(Cyprus) Apollon Limassol	11 February 2023	30 August 2023	15	9	2	4	22	14	+8	60.00
(Romania) Botoșani	28 December 2023	22 July 2024	22	8	5	9	25	27	−2	36.36
(Romania) Argeș Pitești	23 September 2024	present	87	39	21	27	101	82	+19	44.83
Total			295	123	63	109	372	332	+40	41.69

== Honours ==
=== Player ===
Rapid București

- Divizia A: 1998–99
- Cupa României runner-up: 1998–99
- Supercupa României: 1999

Ferencváros

- Magyar Kupa: 2002–03

Apollon Limassol

- Cypriot First Division: 2005–06
- Cypriot Super Cup: 2006

Ermis Aradippou

- Cypriot Second Division: 2008–09

=== Coach ===
Argeș Pitești

- Liga II: 2024–25
