= Mihai Guriță =

Romanian footballer

Personal information
- Date of birth: 1 February 1973 (age 53)
- Place of birth: Dumbrăveni, Romania
- Height: 1.75 m (5 ft 9 in)
- Position: Striker

Youth career
- Bucovina Suceava

Senior career*
Years	Team	Apps	(Gls)
1993–1996	Bucovina Suceava	70	(23)
1997–1998	Foresta Fălticeni	54	(10)
1998–2003	Oțelul Galați	150	(31)
2004–2007	Farul Constanța	104	(23)
2007	Steaua București	0	(0)
2007	→ Gloria Buzău (loan)	4	(0)
2007–2008	Farul Constanța	12	(0)
2008–2009	Cetatea Suceava	12	(2)
2009	Rapid CFR Suceava	4	(2)
2010	Danalis Zvoriștea		
2010–2012	Sporting Suceava	24	(5)
Total		434	(96)

Managerial career
- 2015–2016: Foresta Suceava (assistant)
- 2018–2020: Foresta Suceava (assistant)
- * Club domestic league appearances and goals as of 29 July 2020

Mihai Guriță (born 1 February 1973) is a Romanian former footballer who played as a striker for teams such as: Bucovina Suceava, Foresta Fălticeni, Oțelul Galați and Farul Constanța, among others. After retirement, he was the assistant manager of Foresta Suceava.
