= 1997–98 FC Oțelul Galați season =

FC Oțelul
1997–1998 season
- Chairman: Mihai Stoica
- Manager: Vasile Simionaș
- Divizia A: 4th
- Cupa României: Semi-finals
- Top goalscorer: League: Ştefan (14); All: Ştefan (14); State (9); Tănase (6); Maleş (4); Mihalache (4); Brătianu (3); Tofan (3)

== Competitions ==
=== Divizia A ===
==== League table ====
Pos	Team	Pld	W	D	L	GF	GA	GD	Pts	Qualification or relegation
2	Rapid București	34	24	6	4	70	24	+46	78	Qualification to Cup Winners' Cup qualifying round
3	Argeș Pitești	34	20	5	9	56	38	+18	65	Qualification to UEFA Cup first qualifying round
4	Oțelul Galați	34	20	4	10	54	28	+26	64	Qualification to UEFA Cup first qualifying round
5	Național București	34	18	6	10	57	40	+17	60	Qualification to Intertoto Cup first round
6	Dinamo București	34	17	3	14	66	50	+16	54	

Source: LT (in Romanian)
Rules for classification: 1) points; 2) head-to-head points; 3) head-to-head goal difference; 4) head-to-head goals scored; 5) goal difference; 6) number of goals scored.

==== Results by round ====
Round	1	2	3	4	5	6	7	8	9	10	11	12	13	14	15	16	17	18	19	20	21	22	23	24	25	26	27	28	29	30	31	32	33	34
Ground	H	A	H	A	H	A	A	H	A	H	A	H	A	H	A	H	A	A	H	A	H	A	H	H	A	H	A	H	A	H	A	H	A	H
Result	W	W	W	W	W	D	L	W	W	W	W	W	L	W	L	W	L	W	W	L	L	W	W	W	L	L	L	D	L	W	D	W	D	W
Position	2	1	1	1	1	1	2	3	2	2	1	1	1	1	1	2	1	2	1	1	2	3	3	3	3	3	3	4	5	5	4	4	4	4

Source: Matches
A = Away; H = Home; W = Win; D = Draw; L = Loss

==== Results summary ====
Overall								Home						Away					
Pld	W	D	L	GF	GA	GD	Pts	W	D	L	GF	GA	GD	W	D	L	GF	GA	GD
34	20	4	10	54	28	+26	64	13	2	2	38	9	+29	7	2	8	16	19	−3

==== Matches ====
2 August 1997 Matchday 1	Oțelul Galați	4–0	Sportul Studenţesc	Galați
	Ion 16'; State 25'; Maleş 61'; Tănase 82'			Stadium: Oțelul; Referee: Adrian Porumboiu

6 August 1997 Matchday 2	Gloria Bistrița	0–3	Oțelul Galați	Bistrița
			Ștefan 27', 49'; Tănase 39'	Stadium: Gloria; Referee: Adrian Stoica

9 August 1997 Matchday 3	Oțelul Galați	3–0	Universitatea Cluj	Galați
	State 15'; Ştefan 25' (pen.); Tănase 81'			Stadium: Oțelul; Referee: Alexandru Dobrin

23 August 1997 Matchday 4	Steaua București	1–3	Oțelul Galați	București
	Rotariu 31'		Ştefan 27'; Tofan 50'; Maleş 79'	Stadium: Ghencea; Referee: Aron Huzu

30 August 1997 Matchday 5	Oțelul Galați	7–0	Jiul Petroșani	Galați
	Ştefan 30', 48' (pen.); State 38', 86'; Bratianu 63'; Tofan 75'; Maleş 84'			Stadium: Oțelul; Referee: Valeriu Ioniță

13 September 1997 Matchday 6	Ceahlăul Piatra Neamț	0–0	Oțelul Galați	Piatra Neamț
<! -- No info -->				Stadium: Ceahlăul; Referee: Florin Chivulete

21 September 1997 Matchday 7	Progresul București	2–0	Oțelul Galați	București
	Vâsc 36' (pen.); Petre 61'			Stadium: Cotroceni; Referee: Sorin Vădana

24 September 1997 Matchday 8	Oțelul Galați	3–1	CSM Reșița	Galați
	Brătianu 3'; State 7'; Ştefan 17'		Doană 27'	Stadium: Oțelul; Referee: Cristian Marinescu

27 September 1997 Matchday 9	FCM Bacău	0–1	Oțelul Galați	Bacău
				Stadium: Municipal

4 October 1997 Matchday 10	Oțelul Galați	3–0	Foresta Fălticeni	Galați
	Maleş 30'; State 36'; Bosânceanu 73'			Stadium: Oțelul; Referee: Alexandru Crișan

15 October 1997 Matchday 11	Universitatea Craiova	0–2	Oțelul Galați	Craiova
			Ştefan 6'; Tănase 66'	Stadium: Ion Oblemenco; Referee: Aron Huzu

18 October 1997 Matchday 12	Oțelul Galați	1–0	Rapid București	Galați
	Pelin 90'			Stadium: Oțelul; Referee: Gheorghe Constantin

26 October 1997 Matchday 13	Dinamo București	2–0	Oțelul Galați	București
	Rednic 6'; Contra 65'			Stadium: Ştefan Cel Mare; Referee: Sorin Corpodean

2 November 1997 Matchday 14	Oțelul Galați	1–0	FC Argeş	Galați
	Ştefan 48'			Stadium: Oțelul; Referee: Adrian Porumboiu

8 November 1997 Matchday 15	Chindia Târgoviște	4–2	Oțelul Galați	Târgoviște
	Ceaușu 18'; Stoica 53'; Pelin (o.g.); Jilăveanu 81'		State 30', 47'	Stadium: Chindia; Referee: Iosif Biro

15 November 1997 Matchday 16	Oțelul Galați	2–0	Petrolul Ploieşti	Galați
	Tănase 12'; State 26'			Stadium: Oțelul; Referee: Aron Huzu

22 November 1997 Matchday 17	Farul Constanța	1–0	Oțelul Galați	Constanța
	Mohora 16' (pen.)			Stadium: Farul; Referee: Alexandru Crișan

29 November 1997 Matchday 18	Sportul Studenţesc	0–1	Oțelul Galați	București
			Ştefan 33' (pen.)	Stadium: Sportul; Referee: Stan Prodan

6 December 1997 Matchday 19	Oțelul Galați	3–0	Gloria Bistrița	Galați
	Balint 13'; Arhire 71'; Arhire 78'			Stadium: Oțelul; Referee: Valeriu Ioniță

13 December 1997 Matchday 20	Universitatea Cluj	2–0	Oțelul Galați	Cluj
	Popescu 8', 44'			Stadium: Cluj Arena; Referee: Alexandru Dobrin

1 March 1998 Matchday 21	Oțelul Galați	0–2	Steaua București	Galați
			Munteanu 37' (pen.), 79'	Stadium: Oțelul; Referee: Aron Huzu

7 March 1998 Matchday 22	Jiul Petroşani	0–2	Oțelul Galați	Petroşani
			Pelin 48'; Ştefan 74'	Stadium: Jiul; Referee: Gheorghe Moise

11 March 1998 Matchday 23	Oțelul Galați	2–0	Ceahlăul Piatra Neamț	Galați
	Ion 42'; Brătianu 52'			Stadium: Oțelul; Referee: Constantin Ene

15 March 1998 Matchday 24	Oțelul Galați	3–2	Progresul București	Galați
	Ion 6'; Spirea 42'; Tănase 90'		Sburlea 52', 71'	Stadium: Oțelul; Referee: Sorin Corpodean

22 March 1998 Matchday 25	CSM Reşiţa	3–0	Oțelul Galați	Reşița
	Mutică 21'; Szijj 70', 87'			Stadium: Mircea Chivu; Referee: Iosif Biro

28 March 1998 Matchday 26	Oțelul Galați	1–2	FCM Bacău	Galați
	Ştefan 32' (pen.)		Ardeleanu 69'; Pavel 78'	Stadium: Oțelul; Referee: Adrian Stoica

1 April 1998 Matchday 27	Foresta Fălticeni	1–0	FC Oțelul Galați	Fălticeni
	Minescu 62'			Stadium: Foresta; Referee: Valeriu Ioniță

4 April 1998 Matchday 28	Oțelul Galați	1–1	Universitatea Craiova	Galați
	Tofan 85'		Trică 31'	Stadium: Oțelul; Referee: Florin Chivulete

11 April 1998 Matchday 29	Rapid București	1–0	Oțelul Galați	București
	Marinescu 89'			Stadium: Giuleşti; Referee: Marian Salomir

15 April 1998 Matchday 30	Oțelul Galați	1–0	Dinamo București	Galați
	Ştefan 24'			Stadium: Oțelul; Referee: Sorin Vădana

18 April 1998 Matchday 31	FC Argeş	1–1	Oțelul Galați	Piteşti
	Mutu 29'		Mihalache 72'	Stadium: Nicolae Dobrin; Referee: Valeriu Ioniță

25 April 1998 Matchday 32	Oțelul Galați	2–1	Chindia Târgovişte	Galați
	Mihalache 57', 59'		Negru 28'	Stadium: Oțelul; Referee: Marcel Lică

29 April 1998 Matchday 33	Petrolul Ploieşti	1–1	Oțelul Galați	Ploieşti
	Măldărăşanu 60'		Mihalache 75'	Stadium: Petrolul; Referee: Iosif Biro

2 May 1998 Matchday 34	Oțelul Galați	1–0	Farul Constanța	Galați
	Ştefan 83'			Stadium: Oțelul; Referee: Anton Heleşteanu

=== Cupa României ===
12 November 1997 Round of 32	Laminorul Roman	2–5	Oțelul Galați	Roman
	Țigănuș 45' (pen.); Bărbușcă 66'		Brătianu 3', 17'; State 25'; Ion 47', 54'	Stadium: Laminorul; Referee: Marcel Lică

3 December 1997 Round of 16	Oțelul Galați	6–0	Gloria Buzău	Brăila
	Ion 5', 73'; Ştefan 40'; State 48', 90'; Brătianu 81'			Stadium: Dacia Unirea; Referee: Constantin Ene

25 February 1998 Quarter-finals	Dinamo București	1–0	Oțelul Galați	Buzău
	Petre 55'			Stadium: Gloria; Referee: Marcel Lică

== Players ==
=== Transfers ===
==== In ====
No.	Pos.	Nat.	Name	Age	EU	Moving from	Type	Transfer window	Ends	Transfer fee	Source
-	DF	(Romania)	Nemțanu	23	EU	Steaua București	Transfer	Summer		Undisclosed	
-	DF	(Romania)	Brătianu	29	EU	Universitatea Cluj	Transfer	Summer		Undisclosed	
-	CF	(Romania)	Mihalache	22	EU	Petrolul Ploiești	Transfer	Summer		Undisclosed	
-	CM	(Iraq)	Shnayin	21	EU	Sportul Studențesc București (Romania)	Transfer	Summer		Undisclosed	
-	CM	(Romania)	Apostol	16	EU	Dunărea Galați	Transfer	Summer		Undisclosed	
-	CF	(Romania)	Stanciu	22	EU	ASA Târgu Mureș	Transfer	Summer		Undisclosed	

==== Out ====
No.	Pos.	Nat.	Name	Age	EU	Moving from	Type	Transfer window	Ends	Transfer fee	Source
-	DF	(Moldova)	Lupașcu	21	EU	Nistru Otaci	Transfer	Summer		Undisclosed	
-	CM	(Romania)	Rednic	19	EU	Dinamo București	Transfer	Summer		Undisclosed	
-	DF	(Romania)	Florea	21	EU	Dinamo București	Transfer	Summer		Undisclosed	
-	DF	(Romania)	Alexa	22	EU	Tiraspol	Loan	Summer		Undisclosed	
-	CM	(Iraq)	Shnayin	22	EU	Petrolul Ploiești (Romania)	Transfer	Winter		Undisclosed	
-	CM	(Romania)	Pânzaru	21	EU	Dunărea Galați	Transfer	Winter		Undisclosed	
-	DF	(Romania)	Mirea	26	EU	Midia Năvodari	Transfer	Summer		Undisclosed	
-	CF	(Romania)	Cornea	29	EU	Gloria Bistrița	Transfer	Summer		Undisclosed	
-	CF	(Romania)	Dobrea	28	EU	Foresta Suceava	Transfer	Summer		Undisclosed	
-	DF	(Romania)	Urdaru		EU	Politehnica Iași	Transfer	Summer		Undisclosed	

EU = if holds or not a European Union passport; Country: when 2 flags, 1st flag = country that plays for internationally, 2nd flag = country of birth; N = number on jersey; P = Position (for position name, pause mouse pointer on abbreviation); Name = Name on jersey (for more extensive name, pause mouse pointer on name); Age = age on the day of the signing; Moving from = only indicate the club the player was playing before start playing for this club in this season, for the type of the moving see Status column; Moving to = only indicates the club the player is going to play next, for the type of the moving see Status column; Ends = when the player's current contract ends; n/a = Not applicable.

== See also ==
- 1997–98 Divizia A
- 1997–98 Cupa României
- 1997–98 UEFA Cup
