= 1998–99 FC Oțelul Galați season =

FC Oțelul
1998–99 season
- Chairman: Mihai Stoica
- Manager: Vasile Simionaş
- Divizia A: 6th
- Cupa României: Semi-finals
- Top goalscorer: League: Tănase (10); All: Tănase (10); Balint (3); Guriță (3); Ion (3); Ion (3); Mihalache (3); Nemțanu (3); Oprea (3); Spirea (3); Cernat (2); Maleş (2); Pelin (2); Ştefan (2); Tofan (2)

== Competitions ==
=== Divizia A ===
==== League table ====
Pos	Team	Pld	W	D	L	GF	GA	GD	Pts	Qualification or relegation
4	Argeș Pitești	34	20	4	10	57	37	+20	64	
5	Bacău	34	18	8	8	46	35	+11	62	Qualification to Intertoto Cup first round
6	Oțelul Galați	34	17	4	13	47	33	+14	55 (Note: OTE 3-2 PRO; PRO 0-1 OTE)	
7	Național București	34	18	1	15	61	51	+10	55	
8	Petrolul Ploiești	34	16	5	13	50	46	+4	53	

Source: LT (in Romanian)
Rules for classification: 1) points; 2) head-to-head points; 3) head-to-head goal difference; 4) head-to-head goals scored; 5) goal difference; 6) number of goals scored.

==== Results by round ====
Round	1	2	3	4	5	6	7	8	9	10	11	12	13	14	15	16	17	18	19	20	21	22	23	24	25	26	27	28	29	30	31	32	33	34
Ground	A	H	A	H	A	H	A	H	A	H	A	H	A	H	A	H	A	H	A	H	A	H	A	H	A	H	A	H	A	H	A	H	A	H
Result	W	W	W	D	W	W	L	W	L	W	L	L	L	L	W	L	W	W	W	W	L	L	W	D	L	L	W	W	L	L	D	W	D	L
Position	14	9	9	3	10	3	7	3	2	3	5	3	8	8	12	10	8	7	5	6	10	6	18	5	12	6	15	6	5	7	10	7	6	2

Source: Matches
A = Away; H = Home; W = Win; D = Draw; L = Loss

==== Results summary ====
Overall								Home						Away					
Pld	W	D	L	GF	GA	GD	Pts	W	D	L	GF	GA	GD	W	D	L	GF	GA	GD
34	16	4	14	59	55	+4	52	8	2	7	39	20	+19	8	2	7	20	35	−15

==== Matches ====
1 August 1998 Matchday 1	Foresta Fălticeni	1–2	Oțelul Galați	Fălticeni
	Gheorghe 43' (pen.)		Guriță 23'; Ștefan 45' (pen.)	Stadium: Foresta; Referee: Florin Chivulete

7 August 1998 Matchday 2	Oțelul Galați	3–2	Progresul București	Galați
	Mihalache 43'; Pelin 66'; Ion 79'		Pigulea 20'; Butoiu 60'	Stadium: Oțelul; Referee: Marcel Lică

15 August 1998 Matchday 3	Olimpia Satu Mare	0–1	Oțelul Galați	Satu Mare
			Guriță 67'	Stadium: Olimpia; Referee: Gheorghe Moise

21 August 1998 Matchday 4	Oțelul Galați	1–1	Astra Ploiești	Galați
	Ion 85'		Beraru 68'	Stadium: Oțelul; Referee: Iosif Biro

29 August 1998 Matchday 5	Universitatea Craiova	0–1	Oțelul Galați	Craiova
			Nemțanu 90'	Stadium: Oblemenco; Referee: Aron Huzu

12 September 1998 Matchday 6	Oțelul Galați	5–0	Universitatea Cluj	Galați
	Tănase 6'; Tănase 40'; Tănase 46' (pen.); Ion 54'; Ion 67'			Stadium: Oțelul; Referee: Adrian Stoica

19 September 1998 Matchday 7	FC Argeş Piteşti	2–1	Oțelul Galați	Piteşti
	Barbu 44'; Barbu 45'		Pelin 70'	Stadium: FC Argeș; Referee: Marian Salomir

26 September 1998 Matchday 8	Oțelul Galați	3–0	FC Oneşti	Galați
	Ştefan 39' (pen.); Nemțanu 63'; Maleş 67'			Stadium: Oțelul; Referee: Florin Chivulete

4 October 1998 Matchday 9	Rapid București	3–0	Oțelul Galați	București
	Niculescu 27' (pen.); Niculescu 38'		Tofan Own work by 65.	Stadium: Giulești; Referee: Iosif Biro

17 October 1998 Matchday 10	Oțelul Galați	4–0	CSM Școlar Reșița	Galați
	Ion 24'; Spirea 60'; Spirea 76'; Balint 85'			Stadium: Oțelul; Referee: Aron Huzu

24 October 1998 Matchday 11	Steaua București	2–0	Oțelul Galați	București
	Dănciulescu 2'; Lăcătuș 66'			Stadium: Ghencea; Referee: Sorin Vădana

31 October 1998 Matchday 12	Oțelul Galați	0–1	FCM Bacău	Galați
			Petcu 79'	Stadium: Oțelul; Referee: Marian Salomir

7 November 1998 Matchday 13	Petrolul Ploieşti	2–0	Oțelul Galați	Ploiești
	Onuț 19' (pen.); Onuț 52' (pen.)			Stadium: Ilie Oană; Referee: Constantin Zotta

14 November 1998 Matchday 14	Oțelul Galați	1–2	Ceahlăul Piatra Neamț	Galați
	Balint 43'		Matei 55'; Alistar 72'	Stadium: Oțelul; Referee: Adrian Stoica

21 November 1998 Matchday 15	Farul Constanța	0–1	Oțelul Galați	Constanța
			Tănase 48'	Stadium: Farul; Referee: Valeriu Ioniță

28 November 1998 Matchday 16	Gloria Bistrița	2–1	Oțelul Galați	Bistrița
	Ganea 65' (pen.); Ganea 84' (pen.)		Tănase 17'	Stadium: Gloria; Referee: Marcel Savaniu

6 December 1998 Matchday 17	Oțelul Galați	2–1	Dinamo București	Galați
	Ion 72'; Tănase 90'		Lupescu 55'	Stadium: Oțelul; Referee: Marcel Lică

6 March 1999 Matchday 18	Oțelul Galați	1–0	Foresta Fălticeni	Galați
	Balint 53'			Stadium: Oțelul; Referee: Constantin Zotta

14 March 1999 Matchday 19	Progresul București	0–1	Oțelul Galați	București
			Maleş 89'	Stadium: Cotroceni; Referee: Sorin Corpodean

17 March 1999 Matchday 20	Oțelul Galați	2–0	Olimpia Satu Mare	Galați
	Oprea 4'; Oprea 19'			Stadium: Oțelul; Referee: Florin Chivulete

20 March 1999 Matchday 21	Astra Ploieşti	3–1	Oțelul Galați	Ploieşti
	Dăscălescu 13'; Dăscălescu 34'		Pelin Own work by 46. Tănase 61'	Stadium: Astra; Referee: Sorin Altmayer

3 April 1999 Matchday 22	Oțelul Galați	4–0	Universitatea Craiova	Galați
	Mihalache 2'; Spirea 38'; Tănase 67'; Baștină 69'			Stadium: Oțelul; Referee: Marcel Lică

10 April 1999 Matchday 23	Universitatea Cluj	0–2	Oțelul Galați	Cluj
			Tofan 25'; Tofan 35'	Stadium: Cluj Arena; Referee: Constantin Ene

17 April 1999 Matchday 24	Oțelul Galați	1–1	FC Argeş Piteşti	Galați
	Nemțanu 7'		Bratu 85'	Stadium: Oțelul; Referee: Valeriu Ioniță

21 April 1999 Matchday 25	FC Onești	1–0	Oțelul Galați	Onești
	Scânteie 89'			Stadium: Onești; Referee: Cristian Marinescu

25 April 1999 Matchday 26	Oțelul Galați	0–1	Rapid București	Galați
			Mutică 75'	Stadium: Oțelul; Referee: Marcel Lică

1 May 1999 Matchday 27	CSM Școlar Reșița	2–3	Oțelul Galați	Reşița
	Szijj 11' (pen.); Pogăcean 27'		Cernat 26'; Cernat 37'; Tănase 58'	Stadium: Mircea Chivu; Referee: Laszlo Sajtos

8 May 1999 Matchday 28	Oțelul Galați	2–0	Steaua București	Galați
	Mihalache 24'; Oprea 61' (pen.)			Stadium: Oțelul; Referee: Sorin Altmayer

12 May 1999 Matchday 29	FCM Bacău	1–0	Oțelul Galați	Bacău
	Bolfă 45'			Stadium: Municipal; Referee: Constantin Zotta

15 May 1999 Matchday 30	Oțelul Galați	0–1	Petrolul Ploieşti	Galați
			Onuț 62'	Stadium: Oțelul; Referee: Sorin Vădana

22 May 1999 Matchday 31	Ceahlăul Piatra Neamț	1–1	Oțelul Galați	Piatra Neamț
	Marc 13'		Tănase 45'	Stadium: Ceahlăul; Referee: Valeriu Ioniță

26 May 1999 Matchday 32	Oțelul Galați	2–1	Farul Constanța	Galați
	Guriță 20'; Niță 62' (pen.)			Stadium: Oțelul; Referee: Anton Heleşteanu

29 May 1999 Matchday 33	Oțelul Galați	0–0	Gloria Bistrița	Galați
				Stadium: Oțelul; Referee: Sorin Corpodean

12 June 1999 Matchday 34	Dinamo București	2–1	Oțelul Galați	București
	Gane 38'; Kiriță 88'		Silian 3'	Stadium: Dinamo; Referee: Marian Dorobanțu

=== Cupa României ===
21 October 1998 Round of 32	Crişul Aleşd	0–5	Oțelul Galați	Aleșd
			Tănase 40'; Tănase 49'; Maleş 64'; Maleş 88'; Pelin 68'	Stadium: Aleşd; Referee: Marcel Savaniu

18 November 1998 Round of 16	Oțelul Galați	1–0	Sportul Studențesc	Buzău
	Niță 74'			Stadium: Gloria; Referee: Sorin Altmayer

2 December 1998 Quarter-finals	FCM Bacău	2–0	Oțelul Galați	Bacău
	Ardeleanu 28'; Pavel 74'			Stadium: Municipal; Referee: Gheorghe Moise

9 December 1998 Semi-finals	Oțelul Galați	1–0	FCM Bacău	Galați
	Tofan 5'			Stadium: Oțelul; Referee: Florin Chivulete

== Players ==
=== Transfers ===
==== In ====
No.	Pos.	Nat.	Name	Age	EU	Moving from	Type	Transfer window	Ends	Transfer fee	Source
-	DF	(Romania)	Mozacu	22	EU	Olimpia Satu Mare	Transfer	Winter		Undisclosed	
-	FW	(Romania)	Oprea	26	EU	FC Onești	Transfer	Winter		Undisclosed	
-	CM	(Romania)	Baştină	25	EU	Petrolul Ploiești	Transfer	Winter		Undisclosed	
-	CF	(Romania)	Guriță	25	EU	Foresta Fălticeni	Transfer	Summer		Undisclosed	
-	DF	(Romania)	Alexa	24	EU	Tiraspol (Moldova)	Transfer	Summer		Undisclosed	
-	CF	(Romania)	Niță	21	EU	Corvinul	Transfer	Summer		Undisclosed	
-	CB	(Romania)	Ghionea	19	EU	Dunărea Galați	Transfer	Summer		Undisclosed	
-	CF	(Romania)	Buteseacă	19	EU	Dunărea Galați	Transfer	Summer		Undisclosed	
-	CM	(Romania)	Cernat	18	EU	Dunărea Galați	Transfer	Summer		Undisclosed	
-	CM	(Romania)	Muha	19	EU	Dunărea Galați	Loan	Summer		Undisclosed	
-	CF	(Romania)	Bogdan	19	EU	Dunărea Galați	Transfer	Summer		Undisclosed	
-		(Romania)	Ghinea		EU	Dunărea Galați	Transfer	Summer		Undisclosed	
-	CM	(Romania)	Higlău		EU	Dunărea Galați	Transfer	Summer		Undisclosed	
-	DF	(Romania)	Ariton	19	EU	Dunărea Galați	Transfer	Summer		Undisclosed	
-		(Romania)	Van Caval	19	EU	Dunărea Galați	Transfer	Summer		Undisclosed	
-	DF	(Romania)	Miloiu		EU	Dunărea Galați	Transfer	Summer		Undisclosed	
-	CM	(Romania)	Negraru	19	EU		Transfer	Summer		Undisclosed	
-	CF	(Romania)	Silian		EU		Transfer	Summer		Undisclosed	
-	CM	(Romania)	Gugoaşă		EU		Transfer	Summer		Undisclosed	
-	CF	(Romania)	Oană	26	EU	Gloria Bistrița	Transfer	Summer		Undisclosed	
-	CF	(Romania)	Basalâc	17	EU		Transfer	Summer		Undisclosed	
-	CM	(Romania)	Frunză	20	EU	Dunărea Galați	Transfer	Summer		Undisclosed	

==== Out ====
No.	Pos.	Nat.	Name	Age	EU	Moving from	Type	Transfer window	Ends	Transfer fee	Source
-	DF	(Romania)	Bosânceanu	31	EU	Rocar București	Transfer	Summer		Undisclosed	
-	CF	(Romania)	Niță	21	EU	Cimentul Fieni	Loan	Winter		Undisclosed	
-	DM	(Romania)	Arhire	22	EU	Pohang Steelers (South Korea)	Transfer	Winter		Undisclosed	
-	CF	(Romania)	Ion	30	EU	VfL Bochum (Germany)	Transfer	Autumn		Undisclosed	
-	CF	(Romania)	State	30	EU	Farul Constanța	Transfer	Summer		Undisclosed	
-	DF	(Romania)	Brătianu	30	EU	Farul Constanța	Transfer	Summer		Undisclosed	
-	CF	(Romania)	Stanciu	23	EU	ASA Târgu Mureș	Transfer	Summer		Undisclosed	
-	CM	(Romania)	Frunză	20	EU	Cimentul Fieni	Transfer	Summer		Undisclosed	

EU = if holds or not a European Union passport; Country: when 2 flags, 1st flag = country that plays for internationally, 2nd flag = country of birth; N = number on jersey; P = Position (for position name, pause mouse pointer on abbreviation); Name = Name on jersey (for more extensive name, pause mouse pointer on name); Age = age on the day of the signing; Moving from = only indicate the club the player was playing before start playing for this club in this season, for the type of the moving see Status column; Moving to = only indicates the club the player is going to play next, for the type of the moving see Status column; Ends = when the player's current contract ends; n/a = Not applicable.

== See also ==
- 1998–99 Divizia A
- 1998–99 Cupa României
- 1998–99 UEFA Cup
