= ASC Oțelul Galați in European football =

ASC Oțelul Galați is a professional football club which currently plays in Liga I.

== Total statistics ==
Competition	S	P	W	D	L	GF	GA	GD
UEFA Champions League	1	6	0	0	6	3	11	–8
UEFA Europa League / UEFA Cup	5	14	5	3	6	18	21	–3
UEFA Intertoto Cup	2	8	3	2	3	11	12	-1
Total	8	28	8	5	15	32	44	–12

== Statistics by country ==
Country	Club	P	W	D	L	GF	GA	GD
Albania	KS Dinamo Tirana	2	2	0	0	8	1	+7
Subtotal		2	2	0	0	8	1	+7
Austria	Casino Salzburg	1	0	0	1	1	2	-1
Subtotal		1	0	0	1	1	2	-1
Bosnia and Herzegovina	FK Slavija	2	1	1	0	3	0	+3
Subtotal		2	1	1	0	3	0	+3
Bulgaria	PFC Lokomotiv Sofia	2	0	1	1	1	3	–2
Subtotal		2	0	1	1	1	3	–2
Czech Republic	Sigma Olomouc	1	0	0	1	0	1	-1
Subtotal		1	0	0	1	0	1	-1
Denmark	Aarhus GF	1	0	0	1	0	4	–4
Denmark	Vejle Boldklub	2	0	0	2	0	6	–6
Subtotal		3	0	0	3	0	10	–
England	Manchester United F.C.	2	0	0	2	0	4	–4
Subtotal		2	0	0	2	0	4	–4
Italy	Juventus FC	2	1	0	1	1	5	–4
Subtotal		2	1	0	1	1	5	–4
Portugal	S.L. Benfica	2	0	0	2	0	2	–2
Subtotal		2	0	0	2	0	2	–2
(North Macedonia) Republic of Macedonia	FK Sloga Jugomagnat	2	1	1	0	4	1	+3
Subtotal		2	1	1	0	4	1	+3
Serbia / Serbia and Montenegro	FK Partizan	2	0	1	1	0	1	–1
Subtotal		2	0	1	1	0	1	–1
Slovenia	ND Gorica	2	1	0	1	4	4	0
Subtotal		2	1	0	1	4	4	0
Switzerland	Young Boys	1	0	1	0	3	3	0
Switzerland	FC Basel	2	0	0	2	3	5	–2
Subtotal		3	0	1	2	6	8	–2
Turkey	Trabzonspor	2	2	0	0	4	2	+2
Subtotal		2	2	0	0	4	2	+2
Total		28	8	5	15	32	44	–12

== Statistics by competition ==
Notes for the abbreviations in the tables below:

- 1R: First round
- 2R: Second round
- 3R: Third round
- 1QR: First qualifying round
- 2QR: Second qualifying round

=== UEFA Champions League ===
Season	Round	Club	Home	Away	Aggregate
2011–12	Group C	(Switzerland) Basel	2–3	1–2	4th place
2011–12	Group C	(Portugal) Benfica	0–1	0–1	4th place
2011–12	Group C	(England) Manchester United	0–2	0–2	4th place

=== UEFA Europa League / UEFA Cup ===
Season	Round	Club	Home	Away	Aggregate
1988–89	1R	(Italy) Juventus	1–0	0–5	1–5
1997–98	1QR	(Slovenia) HIT Gorica	4–2	0–2	4–4 (a)
1998–99	1QR	(North Macedonia) Sloga Jugomagnat	3–0	1–1	4–1
1998–99	2QR	(Denmark) Vejle	0–3	0–3	0–6
2004–05	1QR	(Albania) Dinamo Tirana	4–0	4–1	8–1
2004–05	2QR	(Serbia and Montenegro) Partizan	0–0	0–1	0–1
2007–08	2QR	(Bulgaria) Lokomotiv Sofia	0–0	1–3	1–3

=== UEFA Intertoto Cup ===
Season	Round	Club	Home	Away	Aggregate
1993	Group 7	(Switzerland) Young Boys	3–3	N/A	5th place
1993	Group 7	(Austria) Casino Salzburg	N/A	1–2	5th place
1993	Group 7	(Denmark) Aarhus GF	N/A	0–4	5th place
1993	Group 7	(Czech Republic) Sigma Olomouc	0–1	N/A	5th place
2007	2R	(Bosnia and Herzegovina) Slavija Istočno Sarajevo	3–0	0–0	3–0
2007	3R	(Turkey) Trabzonspor	2–1	2–1	4–2

== Top scorers ==
P	Player	Country	Goals
1	Valentin Ștefan	Romania	4
2	Emil Jula	Romania	3
2	Gheorghe Cornea	Romania	3
3	Ciprian Danciu	Romania	2
3	Dragoş Mihalache	Romania	2
3	Gabriel Paraschiv	Romania	2
7	Adrian State	Romania	1
7	Bogdan Aldea	Romania	1
7	Costin Maleș	Romania	1
7	Cristian Negru	Romania	1
7	Daniel Stan	Romania	1
7	Dorin Semeghin	Romania	1
7	Gabriel Giurgiu	Romania	1
7	Gheorghe Rohat	Romania	1
7	Ion Profir	Romania	1
7	Iulian Apostol	Romania	1
7	János Székely	Romania	1
7	Liviu Antal	Romania	1
7	Marius Pena	Romania	1
7	Ștefan Nanu	Romania	1
7	Victoraș Iacob	Romania	1
7	Viorel Ion	Romania	1
