= List of ASC Oțelul Galați managers =

== Managers ==
- + Caretaker manager
- (n/a) = Information not available
- Matches either won or lost during penalties shootouts are listed as draws.

Name	Nationality	From	To	P	W	D	L	GF	GA	Win%	Honours	Notes
Costică Rădulescu	Romania	August 1986	July 1988	72	31	14	27	92	85	43.06		
Cornel Dinu	Romania	August 1988	September 1988	10	2	1	7	6	25	20.00		
Ioan Sdrobiş	Romania	October 1988	November 1988	6	3	2	1	10	6	50.00		
Nicolae Burcea	Romania	December 1988	December 1988	3	1	1	1	6	8	33.33		
Mircea Dridea	Romania	January 1989	June 1989	18	6	2	10	15	26	33.33		
Oţelul spent two seasons in Divizia B. No information is available regarding the coaches.
Ion Moldovan	Romania	July 1991	June 1992	36	16	6	14	41	47	44.44		
Aurel Ţicleanu	Romania	July 1992	June 1994	70	25	11	34	79	100	35.71		
Ioan Sdrobiş	Romania	July 1994	October 1994	10	2	3	5	14	21	20.00		
Vasile Simionaş	Romania	November 1994	2 June 1999	178	87	26	65	264	196	48.88		
Constantin Ploieşteanu+	Romania	2 June 1999	June 1999	1	0	0	1	1	2	0.00		
Dumitru Dumitriu	Romania	21 June 1999	15 May 2000	39	18	4	17	66	63	46.15		
Aurel Ţicleanu	Romania	1 June 2000	12 November 2000	15	6	3	6	21	19	40.00		
Ioan Gigi+	Romania	13 November 2000	5 December 2000	3	0	3	0	1	1	0.00		
Ilie Dumitrescu	Romania	6 December 2000	13 June 2001	15	6	3	6	15	20	40.00		
Victor Roşca	Romania	3 July 2001	6 February 2002	16	5	5	6	15	13	31.25		
Marius Lăcătuş	Romania	9 February 2002	11 June 2002	15	9	2	4	20	13	60.00		
Costel Orac	Romania	3 July 2002	12 December 2003	49	17	14	18	45	55	34.69		
Sorin Cârţu	Romania	29 December 2003	15 December 2004	42	16	12	14	44	35	38.10		
Mihai Stoichiţă	Romania	23 January 2005	June 2005	15	6	2	7	20	20	40.00		
Aurel Şunda	Romania	July 2005	9 November 2005	14	2	6	6	9	20	14.29		
Ioan Gigi+	Romania	10 November 2005	26 December 2005	4	0	2	2	2	5	0.00		
Petre Grigoraş	Romania	27 December 2005	27 June 2009	130	58	23	49	198	181	44.62		
Dorinel Munteanu	Romania	1 July 2009	30 August 2012	120	53	25	42	136	122	44.17	1 Liga I 1 Supercupa României	
Viorel Tănase	Romania	30 August 2012	30 January 2013	16	7	5	4	21	17	43.75		
Ioan Balaur+	Romania	24 February 2013	2 March 2013	2	1	0	1	1	1	50.00		
Petre Grigoraş	Romania	3 March 2013	21 April 2013	6	2	2	2	5	6	33.33		
Marian Dinu+	Romania	22 April 2013	27 June 2013	9	4	1	4	11	2	44.44		
Ionuţ Badea	Romania	28 June 2013	29 October 2013	13	4	2	7	18	24	30.77		
Constantin Schumacher+	Romania	30 October 2013	5 November 2013	2	2	0	0	4	2	100.00		
Ewald Lienen	Germany	6 November 2013	1 June 2014	22	8	3	11	28	28	36.36		
Michael Weiß	Germany	27 June 2014	17 September 2014	8	1	3	4	4	9	12.50		
Daniel Florea+	Romania	18 September 2014	21 September 2014	1	0	0	1	0	1	0.00		
Tibor Selymes	Romania	22 September 2014	1 March 2015	14	2	4	8	6	23	14.29		
Florin Marin	Romania	2 March 2015	30 June 2015	15	5	5	5	17	17	33.33		
Daniel Florea	Romania	27 July 2015	5 February 2016	18	3	3	12	11	25	16.67		
Sorin Haraga	Romania	26 February 2016	1 April 2016	7	0	0	7	2	21	0.00		
Stelian Bordeianu	Romania	22 July 2016	30 June 2017	32	30	0	2	202	20	93.75		
Damian Băncilă	Romania	25 July 2017	21 October 2017	9	5	3	1	24	7	55.56		
Alexandru Ciobanu	Romania	24 October 2017	15 July 2018	19	12	6	1	31	8	63.16		
Stelian Bordeianu	Romania	16 July 2018	17 September 2018	6	4	2	0	15	0	66.67		
Alin Pânzaru	Romania	20 September 2018	25 March 2019	14	10	2	2	23	12	71.43		
Tudorel Pelin	Romania	27 March 2019	31 May 2019	10	4	2	4	16	17	40.00		
Alexandru Ciobanu	Romania	26 June 2019	27 August 2020	17	9	3	5	26	23	52.94		
Petre Grigoraș	Romania	29 August 2020	3 June 2021	23	14	4	5	58	16	60.87		
Dorinel Munteanu	Romania	6 July 2021	30 December 2024	138	64	41	33	200	126	46.38		
Ovidiu Burcă	Romania	1 January 2025	19 March 2025	10	2	2	6	7	13	20.00		
László Balint	Romania	19 March 2025	15 March 2026	42	18	10	14	59	44	42.86		
Stjepan Tomas	Croatia	17 March 2026	22 September 2026	19	6	6	7	27	32	31.58		

Information correct as of match played 21 September 2026. Only competitive matches are counted.
