= 1993–94 FC Dinamo București season =

FC Dinamo București
1993–94 season
- Head coach: Florin Halagian
- Divizia A: 3rd
- Romanian Cup: QF
- UEFA Cup: First round
- Top goalscorer: Marian Savu (12 goals)

The 1993–94 season was FC Dinamo București's 45th season in Divizia A. Dinamo started the season with a terrible loss against greatest rivals Steaua, on home soil and continued with poor results, ending the season with 11 losses.

The match against Progresul, in September, ended 1-1, but Dinamo was punished with a forfeit with a 3–0 loss due to threatening or abuse from the players or coaches against the referees.

In Europe, Dinamo was eliminated in the first round of the UEFA Cup.

The season ended in April to allow the national team to prepare the 1994 FIFA World Cup. After the season, the teams from Divizia A, without the national players, entered the newly-formed League Cup. Dinamo reached the regional final, but lost against Rapid who eventually beat UTA in the competition final.

== Results ==
Divizia A
| Round | Date | Opponent | Stadium | Result | Goals for Dinamo |
|---|---|---|---|---|---|
| 1 | 15 August 1993 | Steaua București | H | 0–3 | |
| 2 | 22 August 1993 | FC Brașov | A | 0–0 | |
| 3 | 28 August 1993 | Gloria Bistrița | H | 2–0 | Moldovan 7, Puşcaş 50 |
| 4 | 1 September 1993 | Oțelul Galați | A | 0–2 | |
| 5 | 19 September 1993 | Progresul București | A | 0–3 | |
| 6 | 25 September 1993 | Rapid București | H | 3–1 | Demollari 18, Mihali 55, Savu 59 |
| 7 | 3 October 1993 | Universitatea Craiova | A | 2–3 | Kadar 18, Moldovan 85 |
| 8 | 6 October 1993 | Politehnica Timișoara | H | 4–1 | Demollari 21, 43, Puşcaş 74, Moldovan 77 |
| 9 | 16 October 1993 | Universitatea Cluj | A | 1–1 | Militaru 69 |
| 10 | 23 October 1993 | Ceahlăul Piatra Neamț | H | 4–0 | Grozavu 21, Mihali 29, Militaru 33, Savu 90 |
| 11 | 30 October 1993 | UTA | A | 0–1 | |
| 12 | 6 November 1993 | Inter Sibiu | H | 4–1 | Militaru 23, 70, C. Pană 65 p, Tănase 81 |
| 13 | 9 November 1993 | Sportul Studențesc | A | 4–0 | Savu 23, Moldovan 26, C. Pană 70 p, Năstase 89 |
| 14 | 21 November 1993 | Dacia Unirea Brăila | H | 2–0 | Brătianu 9 og, Savu 34 |
| 15 | 24 November 1993 | Petrolul Ploieşti | H | 3–1 | Puşcaş 42, Kadar 55, Militaru 60 |
| 16 | 27 November 1993 | Farul Constanța | H | 2–1 | Kadar 45, Savu 60 |
| 17 | 1 December 1993 | Electroputere Craiova | A | 2–2 | Kadar 33, C. Pană 43 p |
| 18 | 4 December 1993 | Steaua București | A | 0–1 | |
| 19 | 11 December 1993 | FC Brașov | H | 6–1 | Constantinovici 27,82,85, Moldovan 36,69, Mihali 59 |
| 20 | 18 December 1993 | Gloria Bistrița | A | 1–1 | Năstase 82 |
| 21 | 21 December 1993 | Oțelul Galați | H | 3–1 | Mihali 11, Savu 23, 66 |
| 22 | 26 February 1994 | Petrolul Ploiești | A | 1–0 | C. Pană 14 |
| 23 | 5 March 1994 | Progresul București | H | 2–0 | C. Pană 70 p, Savu 85 |
| 24 | 9 March 1994 | Rapid București | A | 0–0 | |
| 25 | 16 March 1994 | Universitatea Craiova | H | 2–3 | Militaru 1, Constantinovici 50 |
| 26 | 19 March 1994 | Politehnica Timișoara | A | 2–2 | Savu 35, Moldovan 40 |
| 27 | 26 March 1994 | Universitatea Cluj | H | 4–1 | Moldovan 39, M. Pană 41, C. Pană 55p, Savu 89 |
| 28 | 30 March 1994 | Ceahlăul Piatra Neamț | A | 1–2 | Savu 86 |
| 29 | 2 April 1994 | UTA | H | 5–2 | Savu 13, C. Pană 16 p, Kadar 23, Demollari 34, Constantinovici 59 |
| 30 | 6 April 1994 | Inter Sibiu | A | 0–1 | |
| 31 | 9 April 1994 | Sportul Studențesc | H | 0–0 | |
| 32 | 13 April 1994 | Dacia Unirea Brăila | A | 0–1 | |
| 33 | 24 April 1994 | Farul Constanța | A | 1–2 | C. Pană 12 |
| 34 | 27 April 1994 | Electroputere Craiova | H | 4–2 | Demollari 10, 45, Puşcaş 22, Moldovan 56 |

Cupa României
| Round | Date | Opponent | Stadium | Result | Goals for Dinamo |
|---|---|---|---|---|---|
| Last 32 | 7 December 1993 | Ceahlăul Piatra Neamț | Piatra Neamț | 2–1 | Moldovan (14), Sava (76) |
| Last 16 | 14 December 1993 | Progresul București | București | 2–0 | Potocianu (27 og), Mihali (55) |
| Quarter-finals | 2 March 1994 | FC Argeș | Târgovişte | 0–1 | |

Cupa Ligii
| Round | Date | Opponent | Stadium | Result | Goals for Dinamo |
|---|---|---|---|---|---|
| South Group | 13 May 1994 | Steaua București | București | 2–0 | Kadar (47), Pușcaș (80) |
| South Group | 14 May 1994 | Universitatea Craiova | Craiova | 2–3 | C. Pană (27p), Năstase (90) |
| Regional final | 15 May 1994 | Rapid București | București | 0–1 | |

== UEFA Cup ==
First round

16 September 1993

| Dinamo București (Romania) | 3–2 | (Italy) Cagliari |
|---|---|---|
| Moldovan 5', 31'; Pană 86' | Report | Prunea 12' (o.g.); Dely Valdés 40' |

Bucharest

29 September 1993

| Cagliari (Italy) | 2–0 | (Romania) Dinamo București |
|---|---|---|
| Matteoli 6'; Oliveira 63' | Report |

Cagliari

Cagliari won 4–3 on aggregate.

== Squad ==
Goalkeepers: Florin Prunea (28/0), Perlat Musta (2/0), Sorin Atanasescu (4/0), Stelian Bordeianu (1/0).

Defenders: Zoltan Kadar (31/5), Gheorghe Mihali (30/4), Leontin Grozavu (30/1), Marian Pană (28/1), George Visalom (8/0), Tudorel Cristea (3/0), Vasile Brătianu (3/0), Adrian Matei (2/0), Ion Voicu (0/0).

Midfielders: Florin Constantinovici (32/5), Costel Pană (30/8), Damian Militaru (25/6), Viorel Tănase (25/1), Cristian Sava (15/0), Marian Năstase (12/2), Marian Cobulianu (8/0), Marius Priseceanu (6/0), Sebastian Moga (4/0), Gabriel Răduță (2/0), Marius Coporan (2/0), Eugen Popistașu (1/0), Laurențiu Lică (0/0), Cătălin Hîldan (0/0).

Forwards: Sulejman Demollari (30/6), Viorel Moldovan (29/9), Cristian Pușcaș (27/4), Marian Savu (25/12).

== Transfers ==
Viorel Moldovan was bought from Gloria Bistrița, in exchange for Florin Tene. Marius Cheregi, Tibor Selymes, Ovidiu Hanganu and Dorinel Munteanu were all sold to Cercle Brugge K.S.V. Gábor Gerstenmájer moved to FC Luzern. Vasile Jercălău left for Selena Bacău. Daniel Timofte reached an agreement with Samsunspor. Nelson Mensah moved to Hapoel Tel Aviv.
