= Valentin Ștefan =

Romanian footballer

Personal information
- Date of birth: 25 June 1967 (age 59)
- Place of birth: Galați, Romania
- Position: Defensive midfielder

Youth career
- Dunărea Galați

Senior career*
Years	Team	Apps	(Gls)
1988–1991	Dunărea Galați	?	(?)
1991–1995	Oțelul Galați	100	(26)
1995–1996	Omonia	19	(2)
1996–1998	Oțelul Galați	75	(22)
1999	CSM Reșița	11	(1)
1999–2000	Anagennisi Deryneia	13	(2)
2000	CSM Reșița	?	(?)
Total		218	(53)

International career^{‡}
	Romania B	24	(6)
1997	Romania	1	(0)

Managerial career
- 2012–2013: Omonia U-17
- 2013–2015: Olympiakos Nicosia U-17
- 2015–2018: Omonia U-21
- * Club domestic league appearances and goals as of 30 July 2018 ‡ National team caps and goals as of 23 March 2018

Valentin "Vali" Ștefan (born 25 June 1967) is a Romanian former professional footballer who played as a defensive midfielder.

== Club career ==
Vali Ștefan grew up at Dunărea Galați, for which he also played its first matches at senior level, but the Liga I debut was only on 24 May 1992 for Oțelul Galați, in a 0–1 defeat against FCM Bacău. He played 186 matches in the first league of Romania, most of them for Oțelul Galați, being also the captain of the club in the 1990s and a legend of the red, white and blue side.

Captain of a generation, considered by many supporters to be the most beautiful in Oțelul's history, with players such as: Cătălin Tofan, Costin Maleș, Tudorel Pelin, Viorel Tănase, Gigi Ion or Viorel Ion, Ștefan surprised many fans by the fact that, despite he was a defensive profile player, scored a lot of goals, many of them decisive for "the Steelworkers". As a matter of fact, he was the first player who fight for the Liga I top scorer award, as the player of Oțelul. In the 1997–98 season, Vali Ştefan was the 4th in the table, with 14 goals scored. In the 2011 IFFHS top of the best defensive profile scorers in the history of football, Ștefan was on the 63rd place, over players like: Fernando Hierro, Laurent Blanc, Roberto Carlos or Franz Beckenbauer. As proof of attachment the fans even made him a song, which began with the phrase: Vali Ştefan-căpitan, ca Baresi la Milan! ("Vali Ştefan-captain, like Baresi at Milan!").

He also played for CSM Reșița and outside Romania in Cyprus, for Omonia and Anagennisi Deryneia.

== International career ==
Valentin Ștefan played in 1 match for Romania, an 8–1 victory against Liechtenstein and in 24 matches for Romania B, where he also scored a goal.

== After retirement ==
Valentin Ștefan retired in 2000 and for a period he was the vice-president of Oțelul Galați, then in 2006 he left Romania and moved in Cyprus where he works as baker and football coach.

In 2014 on the occasion of the Oțelul's 50th anniversary he was included by the Dunărea Bătrăna publication in the top 50 legends of Oțelul, together with his 1990s teammates.

In 2016 he became a "socios" member of Oțelul.

On 16 July 2018 he was named as the general manager of Oțelul Galați.

=== Manager career ===
As a football coach, Vali Ștefan worked for Omonia U-17 and Olympiakos Nicosia U-17 squads. He won two U-17 national titles, one with each team and with Olympiakos U-17, also a second league title. From 2015 until 2018 he was the manager of Omonia U-21.
