= Baza Sportivă Zoltan David =

Football ground in Romania

Baza sportivă Zoltan David
- Interactive map of Baza sportivă Zoltan David
- Former names: Baza Ancora
- Location: Galați, Romania
- Coordinates: 45°26′57″N 28°3′32″E
- Owner: Galați City Hall
- Operator: Oțelul Galați
- Capacity: 1,000
- Surface: Grass
- Scoreboard: –

Construction
- Opened: 15 April 2011
- Renovated: 2009–2011
- Expanded: 2009–2011
- Cost: € 1,000,000

Tenants
- Oțelul II (2011–2014); Metalosport Galați (2014–2015)

Baza Sportivă pentru Copii și Juniori "Zoltan David", often referred to simply as Baza Sportivă Zoltan David, is the training ground and youth system base of Romanian football club Oțelul Galați, and the home ground for the reserves team, Oțelul II.

After countless years of it being an abandoned ground, Oțelul Galați rented the ground in order to renovate it and move the reserves and youth teams from Stadionul Siderurgistul.

After two years, the ground was opened for youth teams in February 2011 and Oțelul II played their first match two months later.
