= Marius Stan (footballer) =

Romanian footballer and politician

Personal information
- Date of birth: 5 June 1957 (age 69)
- Place of birth: Hunedoara, Romania
- Position: Centre back

Senior career*
Years	Team	Apps	(Gls)
1980–1981	CSU Galați		
1981–1982	Dunărea Galați		
1982–1989	Oțelul Galați (Note: The statistics for the 1982–83, 1983–84 and 1985–86 Divizia B seasons are unavailable.)	100	(6)
1990–1991	Progresul Brăila	29	(1)
Total		129	(7)
Mayor of Galați
In office 2012–2016
Preceded by	Dumitru Nicolae
Succeeded by	Ionuț-Florin Pucheanu
- * Club domestic league appearances and goals as of 21 March 2018

Marius Stan (born 5 June 1957 in Hunedoara) is a former Romanian football player and former president of Oțelul Galați. His tenure has seen the most successful period in the history of the club, with Oţelul securing both the Romanian title and the Supercupa României, both in 2011.

After finishing second during his first attempt in the 2008 local elections, he was elected Mayor of Galați in 2012 after receiving 48.7% of the votes.

== Honours ==
Oțelul Galați

- Liga II: 1985–86
