= Valentin Lupașcu =

Moldovan footballer

Personal information
- Date of birth: 18 November 1975 (age 50)
- Place of birth: Ratuș, Soviet Union
- Height: 1.83 m (6 ft 0 in)
- Positions: Central defender; right back; midfielder

Senior career*
Years	Team	Apps	(Gls)
1995–1996	Spumante Cricova	41	(5)
1997	Oțelul Galați	2	(0)
1997–1998	Nistru Otaci	7	(0)
1998	Rubin Kazan	6	(0)
1999–2008	Nistru Otaci	216	(1)
2008–2009	Tiligul-Tiras Tiraspol	14	(0)
Total		286	(6)

International career
1996	Moldova U21	2	(0)
1999	Moldova	1	(0)
- * Club domestic league appearances and goals

Valentin Lupașcu (born 18 November 1975) is a Moldovan former footballer who played as a defender.

== International career ==
Valentin Lupașcu played one friendly game at international level for Moldova, when he came as a substitute and replaced Oleg Șișchin in the 89th minute of a match against Hungary which ended 1–1.

== Honours ==
Nistru Otaci

- Cupa Moldovei: 2004–05
