= Mihai Alexa =

Romanian footballer

Personal information
- Date of birth: 4 August 1974 (age 52)
- Position: Midfielder

Senior career*
Years	Team	Apps	(Gls)
1995–1996	Politehnica Iași		
1996–1997	Oțelul Galați		
1997–1998	Constructorul Chişinău		
1998–1999	Oțelul Galați		
2001–2003	Zimbru Chișinău		
2003–2004	Politehnica Iași		
2004–2005	Unirea Focșani		
- * Club domestic league appearances and goals

Mihai Alexa (born 4 August 1974) is a retired Romanian football midfielder.
