= Ion Ceaușu =

Romanian footballer

Personal information
- Full name: Ion Romică Ceaușu
- Date of birth: 13 October 1970 (age 56)
- Place of birth: Pitești, Romania
- Height: 1.89 m (6 ft 2 in)
- Positions: Central midfielder; attacking midfielder

Youth career
- CSȘ Aripi Pitești

Senior career*
| Years | Team | Apps | (Gls) |
| 1989–1997 | Argeș Pitești (Note: The statistics for the 1992–93 Divizia B season are unavailable.) | 159 | (15) |
| 1997–1998 | Chindia Târgoviște | 37 | (5) |
| 1999 | Flacăra Horezu | | |
| 1999 | Flacăra Râmnicu-Vâlcea | 1 | (0) |
| 1999–2003 | Gloria Bistrița | 91 | (3) |
| Total | | 288 | (23) |

International career
| 1991 | Romania U21 | 3 | (1) |
- * Club domestic league appearances and goals

Ion Romică Ceaușu (born 13 October 1970) is a Romanian former footballer who played as a midfielder.

== Honours ==
Argeș Pitești

- Divizia B: 1993–94
