= Leonard Nemțanu =

Romanian footballer

Personal information
- Full name: Ioan Leonard Nemțanu
- Date of birth: 28 November 1973 (age 52)
- Place of birth: Preutești, Romania
- Height: 1.83 m (6 ft 0 in)
- Position: Centre back

Senior career*
Years	Team	Apps	(Gls)
1991–1993	CSM Suceava		
1993	Petrolul Ploiești	1	(0)
1994	Politehnica Iași		
1994	Rocar București	1	(0)
1995–1996	Politehnica Iași	45	(1)
1996–1997	Steaua București	3	(1)
1997–2000	Oțelul Galați	68	(4)
2000–2001	Rocar București	25	(0)
2001–2003	Național București	23	(0)
2003	Argeș Pitești	5	(0)
2004	Ceahlăul Piatra Neamț	11	(1)
2004	Oțelul Galați	1	(0)
Total		183	(7)
- * Club domestic league appearances and goals

Ioan Leonard Nemțanu (born 28 November 1973) is a Romanian former football defender.

== Honours ==
Steaua București

- Divizia A: 1996–97
- Cupa României: 1996–97

Rocar București

- Cupa României runner-up: 2000–01

Național București

- Cupa României runner-up: 2002–03
