= Constantin Bosânceanu =

Romanian footballer (1966–2020)

Personal information
- Date of birth: 26 August 1966
- Place of birth: Suceava, Romania
- Date of death: 31 December 2020 (aged 54)
- Place of death: Suceava, Romania
- Position: Defender

Senior career*
Years	Team	Apps	(Gls)
1992–1995	Bucovina Suceava		
1995–1998	Oțelul Galați		
1998	Rocar București		
1999	Unirea Botoșani		
- * Club domestic league appearances and goals

Constantin Bosânceanu (26 August 1966 – 31 December 2020) was a Romanian football defender.

He died at age 54.
