= Mircea Stanciu =

Romanian footballer

Personal information
- Full name: Mircea Stanciu
- Date of birth: 30 April 1975 (age 51)
- Place of birth: Ocna Mureș, Romania
- Position: Forward

Senior career*
Years	Team	Apps	(Gls)
1992–1999	ASA Târgu Mureș	107	(38)
1996–1997	→ Steaua București (loan)	2	(0)
1997–1998	→ Oțelul Galați (loan)	15	(0)
1998–1999	→ Olimpia Satu Mare (loan)	11	(1)
1999–2001	CSM Reșița	34	(12)
2001–2002	Gaz Metan Mediaș	21	(6)
2003–04	CFR Cluj	10	(5)
2004–05	Unirea Alba Iulia	12	(1)
Total		212	(63)
- * Club domestic league appearances and goals as of 24 April 2018

Mircea Stanciu (born 30 April 1975) is a Romanian former professional footballer. He played in Romania's Liga I for FC Steaua București, FC Oțelul Galați, FC Olimpia Satu Mare, CSM Reșița and FC Apulum Alba Iulia.
