= Daniel Florea (footballer, born 1975) =

Romanian footballer and coach

Personal information
- Date of birth: 18 December 1975 (age 50)
- Place of birth: Vaslui, Romania
- Height: 1.77 m (5 ft 10 in)
- Position: Left-back

Team information
- Current team: Metaloglobus București (assistant)

Youth career
- –1993: Oțelul Galați

Senior career*
| Years | Team | Apps | (Gls) |
| 1993–1997 | Oțelul Galați | 84 | (2) |
| 1997–2001 | Dinamo București | 94 | (3) |
| 2001–2004 | Shakhtar Donetsk | 58 | (1) |
| 2001–2002 | Shakhtar-2 Donetsk | 2 | (0) |
| 2005 | Metalurh Zaporizhzhia | 13 | (0) |
| 2005 | Metalurh Donetsk | 13 | (0) |
| 2006 | Dinamo București | 9 | (0) |
| 2006–2009 | APOEL | 51 | (0) |
| 2010–2013 | Dunărea Galați | 35 | (3) |
| Total | | 359 | (9) |

International career
| 1999–2002 | Romania | 3 | (0) |

Managerial career
- 2013: Oțelul Galați II (assistant)
- 2013: Oțelul Galați II (caretaker)
- 2014: Oțelul Galați II (assistant)
- 2014–2015: Oțelul Galați (assistant)
- 2015–2016: Oțelul Galați
- 2016: Delta Dobrogea Tulcea (assistant)
- 2017: Olimpia Satu Mare
- 2018: Voluntari (assistant)
- 2019–2021: Farul Constanța (assistant)
- 2021: Unirea Constanța (assistant)
- 2022: Concordia Chiajna (assistant)
- 2022–2023: Gloria Buzău (assistant)
- 2023–2025: Metaloglobus București (assistant)
- 2025–2026: Farul Constanța (assistant)
- 2026–: Metaloglobus București (assistant)
- * Club domestic league appearances and goals

Daniel Florea (born 18 December 1975) is a Romanian professional football manager and former player who played as a left-back, currently assistant coach at Liga II club Metaloglobus București.

== International career ==
Daniel Florea played three matches for Romania, making his debut under coach Victor Pițurcă when he came as a substitute and replaced Dumitru Mitriță in the 88th minute of a friendly which ended with a 2–0 victory against Estonia. His second game for the national team was a 1–0 away victory against Azerbaijan at the Euro 2000 qualifiers. His last match for Romania was a friendly which ended with a 1–0 loss against Greece.

== Career statistics ==
=== International ===
Appearances and goals by national team and year
| National team | Year | Apps | Goals |
|---|---|---|---|
| Romania | 1999 | 2 | 0 |
| Romania | 2002 | 1 | 0 |
| Total | | 3 | 0 |

== Honours ==
=== Player ===
Dinamo București

- Divizia A: 1999–00
- Cupa României: 1999–00, 2000–01

Shakhtar Donetsk

- Ukrainian Premier League: 2001–02
- Ukrainian Cup: 2001–02, 2003–04

APOEL

- Cypriot First Division: 2006–07, 2008–09
- Cypriot Cup: 2007–08
- Cypriot Super Cup: 2008
