= Dragoș Mihalache =

Romanian footballer and manager

Personal information
- Full name: Dragoș Mihail Mihalache
- Date of birth: 25 June 1975 (age 51)
- Place of birth: Ploiești, Romania
- Height: 1.73 m (5 ft 8 in)
- Position: Striker

Youth career
- Petrolistul Boldești

Senior career*
Years	Team	Apps	(Gls)
1993–1994	Petrolistul Boldești	?	(?)
1994	Petrolul Ploiești	45	(2)
1995	Flacăra Moreni	6	(1)
1995–1996	Petrolistul Boldești	?	(?)
1996–1997	Petrolul Ploiești	46	(6)
1998–2000	Oțelul Galați	54	(14)
2000–2003	Astra Ploiești	37	(10)
2003–2004	Petrolul Ploiești	15	(6)
2004–2005	Gaz Metan Mediaș	10	(5)
2005–2006	APOP Kinyras	8	(1)
Total		221	(45)

Managerial career
- 2008–2009: Petrolistul Boldești
- 2011: CS Ștefănești
- 2013: CS Blejoi
- 2026: CSO Băicoi
- * Club domestic league appearances and goals as of 1 March 2018

Dragoș Mihail "Norman" Mihalache (born 25 June 1975) is a Romanian retired football player. He was the manager of Petrolistul Boldești from June 2008 until November 2009, when he was fired. Mihalache also trained CS Ștefănești in 2011 and CS Blejoi in 2013.
