= Gheorghe Cornea =

Romanian footballer (born 1967)

Gheorghe Cornea (born 7 July 1967) is a Romanian football coach and former player.

== Playing career ==
Cornea was born in Târgu Jiu. He played professional football in Romania and Morocco, his best season involved scoring 14 goals for Oţelul Galaţi in the 1994–95 Divizia A season.

In addition he has been selected several times in the national team of Romania.

- Fotbal Club Oțelul Galați (Romania)
- Asociația Clubul de Fotbal Gloria 1922 Bistrița (Romania)
- Fotbal Club Brașov (Romania)
- Asociația Clubul de Fotbal Gloria 1922 Bistrița (Romania)
- Maghreb Association sportive de Fès (Morocco)
- Hassania Union Sport d'Agadir (Morocco)

== Coaching career ==
Gheorghe Cornea is a professional football coach who has worked in Africa, the Middle East, and Europe.

He trained in leagues across these regions and coached many accomplished players.

He has not only been a club coach, but he has also trained national teams.

He was also Technical Director in some of the clubs where he worked.

- 2004–2005: Minerul Certej (Romania)

Coach of the professional team

- 2005–2006: CS Mureșul Deva (Romania)

Coach of the professional team

- 2006–2008: Hassania Union Sport d'Agadir (Morocco)

Coach of the U-21 football team

- 2008–2009: Al Shabab Riyadh (Kingdom of Saudi Arabia)

Coach of the professional team

- 2008–2009: Al Shabab Riyadh (Kingdom of Saudi Arabia)

Assistant Coach of the professional team

- September – December 2009: Al Nasr Salalah (Oman)

Assistant Coach of the professional team

- January – May 2010 : Al-Taawoun Football Club (Kingdom of Saudi Arabia)

Assistant Coach of the professional team

- 2010–2011: CS CFR Simeria (Romania)

Coach of the professional team

- August – December 2011: Ohod Club (Kingdom of Saudi Arabia)

Coach of the professional team

- January – June 2012: Al-Taawoun Football Club (Saudi Arabia)

Coach of the professional team

- 2012–2013: AFC Fortuna Poiana Campina (Romania)

Coach of the professional team

- 2013–2014: Hassania Union Sport d'Agadir (Morocco)

Technical Director

- 2014–2016: U-18 Romania National Team

National Team Coach of the U-18 national team

- July 2016 – January 2017: Qatar Sports Club (Qatar)

Assistant Coach of the professional team

- 2017–2018: CNS Cetate Deva (Romania)

Coach of the professional team

- 2018–2019: Al-Shorta El-Gadarif (Sudan)

Coach of the professional team

- 2019–present: Al-Hazm Rass (Kingdom of Saudi Arabia)

Assistant Coach of the professional team

== Honors ==
=== Player ===
  - Champion of Morocco with Hassania Union Sport d'Agadir
  - Champion of Romania
  - Winner of the Cup of Romania

=== Coach ===
  - U21 Champion of Morocco 2008
  - Vice champion of Saudi Arabia 2010
  - Promote in Saudi Arabia Premier League 2010
