= Stelian Bordeianu =

Romanian footballer

Personal information
- Date of birth: 15 September 1968 (age 58)
- Place of birth: Petricani, Romania
- Position: Goalkeeper

Youth career
- LPS Bacǎu

Senior career*
Years	Team	Apps	(Gls)
1988–1989	Textila Buhuși		
1989–1992	Cetatea Târgu Neamț		
1992–1994	Politehnica Iași		
1994–1995	Dinamo București		
1995	→ Brașov		
1996–2003	Oțelul Galați		
- * Club domestic league appearances and goals

Stelian Bordeianu (born 15 September 1968) is a retired Romanian football goalkeeper.
