= Emil Spirea =

Romanian footballer

Personal information
- Date of birth: 8 February 1969 (age 57)
- Place of birth: Bucharest, Romania
- Position: Defender

Senior career*
Years	Team	Apps	(Gls)
1989–1991	Brașov		
1991–1994	Politehnica Iași		
1994–2001	Oțelul Galați		
2001	Petrotub Roman		
2002–2003	Dacia Unirea Brăila		
- * Club domestic league appearances and goals

Emil Spirea (born 8 February 1969) is a retired Romanian football defender.
