= Iulian Arhire =

Romanian footballer (born 1976)

Personal information
- Date of birth: 17 March 1976 (age 50)
- Place of birth: Galaţi, Romania
- Height: 1.79 m (5 ft 10 1/2 in)
- Position: Midfielder

Senior career*
Years	Team	Apps	(Gls)
1994	Constant Galați	15	(1)
1995–1998	Oțelul Galați	84	(3)
1999	Pohang Steelers	7	(0)
2000	Alania Vladikavkaz	7	(0)
2000	Zimbru Chişinău	17	(1)
2001	Dinamo București	2	(0)
2001–2002	Zimbru Chişinău	16	(1)
2002–2003	Metalurh Donetsk	6	(0)
2003	→ Volyn Lutsk (loan)	1	(0)
2004–2006	Politehnica Iaşi	34	(0)
2006	Oţelul Galaţi	6	(0)
2007	Unirea Urziceni	?	(?)
2008	Gloria Bistriţa	8	(0)
- * Club domestic league appearances and goals

Iulian Arhire (born 17 March 1976) is a Romanian former professional footballer who played as a midfielder.

== Club career ==
Arhire began his career at Constant Galaţi. He made his debut in the Romanian Liga I on 4 March 1995, for Oțelul Galați against rivals from Inter Sibiu. He also played for Pohang Steelers, Alania Vladikavkaz, Zimbru Chişinău, Dinamo București, Metalurh Donetsk, Volyn Lutsk, Politehnica Iaşi, Unirea Urziceni and Gloria Bistriţa.
