= Costin Maleș =

Romanian footballer

Personal information
- Date of birth: 25 July 1969 (age 57)
- Place of birth: Galați, Romania
- Height: 1.86 m (6 ft 1 in)
- Position: Midfielder

Youth career
- Oțelul Galați

Senior career*
Years	Team	Apps	(Gls)
1988–2003	Oțelul Galați	323	(41)
Total		323	(41)
- * Club domestic league appearances and goals as of 23 March 2018

Costin Maleș (born 25 July 1969) is a Romanian former professional footballer who played as a midfielder. Maleș played all his career only for Oțelul Galați, in which history he entered forever after 323 matches played and 41 goals scored. He retired at the end of the 2002–03 season, being awarded by the club, together with Cătălin Tofan, another legend of the red, white and blues that retired at the end of that season.
