= Tudorel Pelin =

Romanian footballer

Personal information
- Date of birth: 15 January 1969 (age 57)
- Place of birth: Tichilești, Romania
- Height: 1.81 m (5 ft 11 1/2 in)
- Position: Centre back

Senior career*
Years	Team	Apps	(Gls)
1992–1995	Dacia Unirea Brăila	62	(2)
1995–2004	Oțelul Galați	218	(6)
2004–2005	Dacia Unirea Brăila	46	(0)
Total		326	(8)

Managerial career
- 2009–2011: Dunărea Galaţi (assistant)
- 2012: Farul Constanța (assistant)
- 2012–2013: Oțelul Galați (assistant)
- 2013–2014: SC Bacău (assistant)
- 2015–2016: Metalosport Galați (assistant)
- 2016–2017: Cetate Deva (assistant)
- 2018–2019: Oțelul Galați (assistant)
- 2019: Oțelul Galați
- 2023–2024: Viitorul Ianca (assistant)
Medal record
Dacia Unirea Brăila
Runner-up	Cupa României	1993
- * Club domestic league appearances and goals as of 28 March 2019

Tudorel Pelin (born 15 January 1969) is a retired Romanian football player.

== Honours ==
Dacia Unirea Brăila

- Cupa României runner-up: 1992–93
