= Adrian State =

Romanian footballer

Personal information
- Full name: Eusebio Adrian State
- Date of birth: 28 June 1968 (age 58)
- Place of birth: Galați, Romania
- Position: Forward

Senior career*
Years	Team	Apps	(Gls)
1986–1988	Oțelul Galați		
1991–1993	Steaua București		
1993–1994	Ceahlăul Piatra Neamț		
1994–1995	Argeș Pitești		
1995–1998	Oțelul Galați		
1998	Farul Constanța		
1999	Dunărea Galați		
2000–2001	Oțelul Galați		
- * Club domestic league appearances and goals

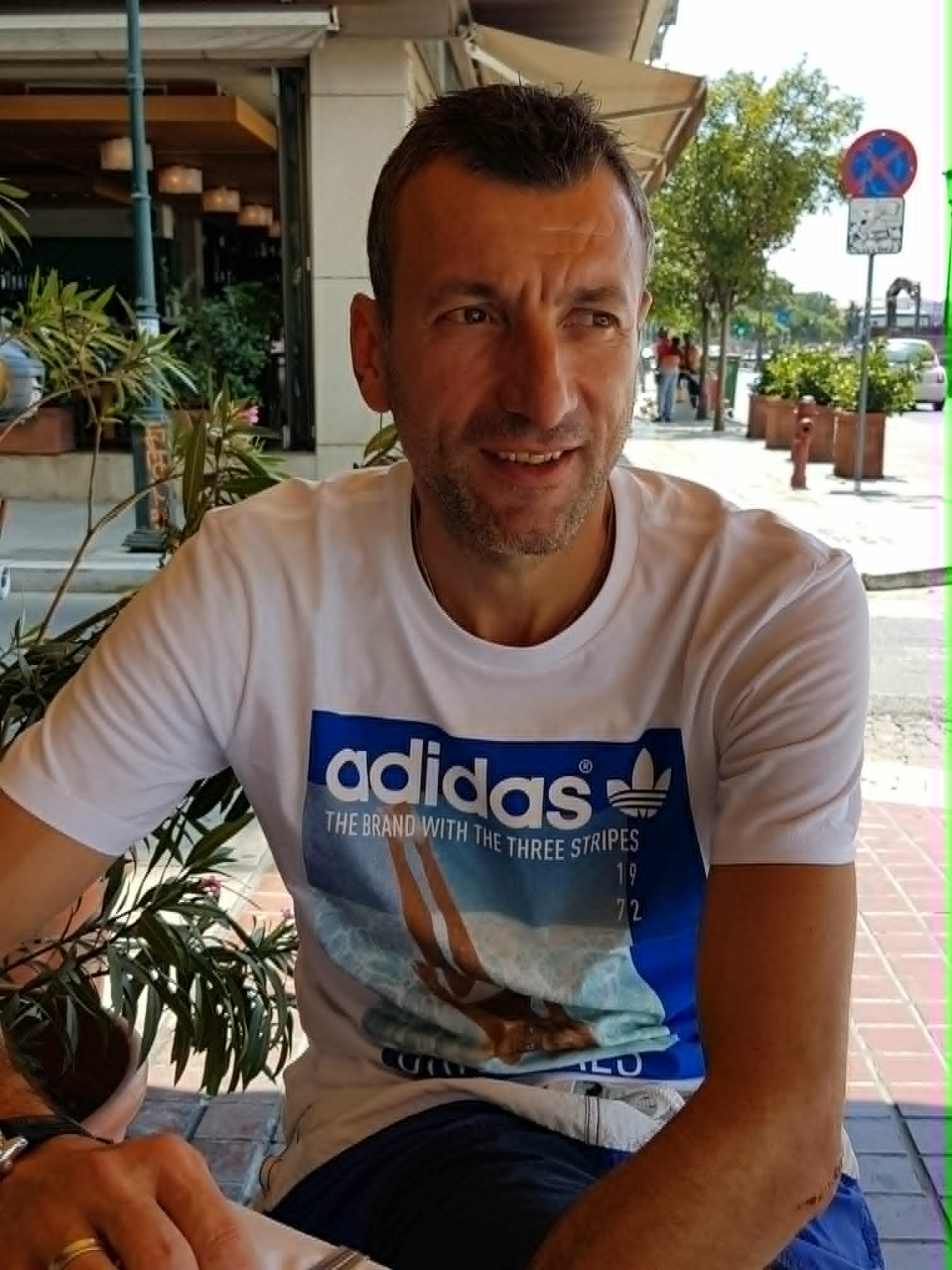
Adrian Eusebiu State

Adrian State (born 28 June 1968) is a retired Romanian football striker living in Belgium. He started a company called Stab Construct in 2009.
