= FC Metalosport Galați =

Romanian football club

Metalosport Galați
- Full name: Fotbal Club Metalosport Galați
- Short name: Metalosport Galați
- Founded: 1937
- Dissolved: 2018
- Ground: Nicolae Rainea
- Capacity: 23,000
- 2017–18: Liga III, Seria I, 15th (relegated)
Home colours	Away colours	Third colours

Fotbal Club Metalosport Galați, commonly known as Metalosport Galați, was a Romanian professional football club based in Galați, Romania.

== History ==
Football from Galați can boast a long and rich history. If the sport with the round ball appeared in the cities of Arad and Bucharest shortly before 1900, in Galați arrived about ten years later. This was possible due to the presence in the city of foreign trade companies and representations.

The first games took place in 1908, when a team set up by officer Vladovici met a group of English sailors seated in the harbor. The career soldier, who had studied in France, brought to Galați the first regulation of the football game – a ball and a pair of boots.

The birth of FC Metalosport Galați club took place in 1937, when other sports groups are attracted by this movement and they worked together with established teams and associations. Among these entities, since 1937 Metalosport appeared, the first metallurgical group whose presence on the divisional stage is registered in the Divizia C championship, in the Seria II of the South League, in the competitive year 1937–38 (5th place at the end of the championship).

The third league – Divizia C – was organized for the first time 73 years ago (1936). It was an autumn-spring edition. The 52 participants were divided into five series – according to geographic criteria: north, south, west, center and east. After several years of Divizia C, 1948–1949, 1963–1966, and various name changes like Trefilorul or Siderurgistul II in the 1981–1982 season, the team of Metalosport Galați is reinforced with players from other clubs from Galați and the team leadership together with the team's owner, "Cristea Nicolae" Factory, aims to promote in the upper Divizia B. At the end of the 1981–1982 season, Metalosport Galați managed to rank 1st in the championship and promoted to Divizia B.

In 2000, the team was disbanded, eleven years later, a new administrative team refounded FC Metalosport Galați. The initiative belonged to his former player, Dorin Butunoiu, helped by a group of people, including Iulian Aramă, Marius Vasilache, Marian Ursu, Andu Nicolau and Radu Iorgu.

The team evolved from 2011 in the 5th and 4th Division and promoted to the Liga III at the end of the 2013–14 season, after a play-off match against FC Gârceni.

In its first three Liga III seasons after the refoundation the best place obtained was 5th.

In the 2017–18 season the club struggled with serious financial problems, also the results were very bad and after a half of the championship the club had none victories or draws, only defeats (14), 2 goals scored and 115 received. Despite this terrible situation, Metalosport stubbornly began to return on the pitch also in the second part of the season, but finally the financial problems were too big and after a 12 points deduction, Romanian Football Federation excluded the club from Liga III. Following the exclusion, Metalosport dissolved.

== Stadium ==
The club played its home matches on Stadionul Nicolae Rainea from Galați.

== Honours ==
Liga III

- Winners (1): 1981–82

Liga IV – Galați County

- Winners (4): 1971–72, 1975–76, 1977–78, 2013–14
- Runners-up (1): 2012–13

== Former managers ==
- (Romania) Viorel Tănase (2015–2016)
