= Vasile Brătianu =

Romanian footballer

Personal information
- Date of birth: 13 August 1967 (age 59)
- Place of birth: Brăila, Romania
- Height: 2.01 m (6 ft 7 in)
- Position: Central defender

Senior career*
Years	Team	Apps	(Gls)
1986–1994	Dacia Unirea Brăila (Note: The statistics for the 1986–87, 1988–89 and 1989–90 Divizia B seasons are unavailable.)	124	(15)
1986–1989	→ Petrolul Ianca (loan)		
1994	Dinamo București	4	(0)
1995–1997	Universitatea Cluj	59	(10)
1997–1998	Oțelul Galați	23	(3)
1998–1999	Farul Constanța	11	(1)
1999	Petrolul Brăila		
Total		221	(29)

International career
1992	Romania B	5	(0)
1993	Romania	1	(0)
- * Club domestic league appearances and goals

Vasile Brătianu (also known as Vasile Brătianu II; born 13 August 1967) is a retired Romanian footballer who played as a central defender.

== Club career ==
Brătianu, nicknamed "Pluto", was born on 13 August 1967 in Brăila. He began playing football at local club Dacia Unirea during the 1986–87 Divizia B season. In the middle of the season, Brătianu joined Divizia C side Petrolul Ianca which he helped achieve promotion to the second league. However, after one season Petrolul was relegated to the third league, but he stayed with the club for another six months. Subsequently, he went back to Dacia Unirea, helping them gain promotion to the first league at the end of the 1989–90 season. Brătianu made his Divizia A debut on 12 August 1990 under coach Constantin Oțet in a 1–0 away loss to Sportul Studențesc București. During the 1992–93 season, he scored a career best of nine goals. In the same season, Dacia Unirea reached the 1993 Cupa României final where coach Ioan Sdrobiș used him the entire match in the 2–0 loss to Universitatea Craiova. However, in the following season, the team was relegated, but Brătianu continued to play in Divizia A, as he signed with Dinamo București. There, he played only four league matches under coach Ion Moldovan in the first half of the 1994–95 season. He also represented The Red Dogs in one UEFA Cup match, a 2–1 away loss to Trabzonspor. Subsequently, Brătianu joined Universitatea Cluj for two and a half seasons. Then he went for the 1997–98 season at Oțelul Galați. He helped The Steelworkers secure a fourth place in the league and played in both legs of the UEFA Cup first qualifying round, where they were eliminated by HIT Gorica. Afterwards, he joined Farul Constanța where he made his last Divizia A appearances during the 1998–99 season, totaling 221 matches with 29 goals in the competition. In 1999, Brătianu went to play for Petrolul Brăila in Divizia C, where he ended his career shortly afterwards.

== International career ==
In 1992, Brătianu played five matches for Romania's B team.

Brătianu made one appearance for Romania on 22 September 1993 when coach Anghel Iordănescu sent him in the 86th minute to replace Ionel Pârvu in a 1–0 friendly victory against Israel.

== Personal life ==
His brother, Constantin, was also a footballer who played as a goalkeeper and they were teammates at Dacia Unirea Brăila.

== Honours ==
Petrolul Ianca

- Divizia C: 1986–87

Dacia Unirea Brăila

- Divizia B: 1989–90
- Cupa României runner-up: 1992–93
