= Viorel Ion =

Romanian footballer and manager

Personal information
- Date of birth: 2 November 1967 (age 58)
- Place of birth: Mărăcineni, Buzău, Romania
- Height: 1.75 m (5 ft 9 in)
- Position: Striker

Senior career*
Years	Team	Apps	(Gls)
1986–1991	Gloria Buzău^{1}^{2}	4	(4)
1991–1992	Oțelul Galați	33	(11)
1992–1995	Steaua București	73	(9)
1995–1998	Oțelul Galați	100	(28)
1998–1999	VfL Bochum	12	(1)
1999–2000	Oțelul Galați	36	(5)
2000–2001	Rapid București	14	(0)
2001–2003	Gloria Buzău^{3}	18	(3)
2003–2004	Rulmentul Alexandria	8	(0)
2004–2005	Dunărea Galați	20	(4)
2005–2008	Gloria Buzău	56	(8)
Total		374	(73)

International career
1991–1997	Romania	4	(0)

Managerial career
- 2001-2003: Gloria Buzău (player-coach)
- 2003-2004: R. Alexandria (player-coach)
- 2004-2005: Dunărea Galați (player-coach)
- 2005–2008: Gloria Buzău (player-coach)
- 2008-2009: Petrolul Berca (president)
- 2010: FC Drobeta-Turnu Severin
- 2011–2012: CF Brăila
- 2012–2013: CS Otopeni
- 2013–2016: Gloria Buzău
- * Club domestic league appearances and goals

Viorel Ion (born 2 November 1967) is a Romanian football manager. Throughout his playing career, Viorel Ion played for several teams, including Oțelul Galați, Steaua București, VfL Bochum and Rapid București. He was player-manager of Gloria Buzău, which he helped promote to Liga I during the 2006–07 season.

== Playing career ==
Ion was born in Buzău. His Romanian first league debut took place in 1984, at the age of 17, playing for Gloria Buzău. In 1991, he left his club, at the time relegated to Liga II, for Oțelul Galați. Nicknamed Vioară (Violin), he subsequently transferred to Steaua București, winning three Romanian Champion titles with that team. From Steaua, he went on to play in the German Bundesliga for VfL Bochum. Upon his return to Romania, he played for Rapid București and Oțelul Galați again.

Ion made four appearances for the Romania national football team.

== Manager career ==
In 2001, he returned to Buzău, to find his old team, Gloria, relegated to the Romanian third division. He took over as player-manager and promoted the team back to Liga II in his first year. Later on, he attempted to lead Gloria to Liga I in 2003, when the team lost the promotion play-off to Politehnica Timișoara.

In 2003-2004 season he was player-manager of Rulmentul Alexandria, where he managed to finish 11th in 2003-04 Divizia B. Next season he went to be a player-manager at Dunărea Galați, finishing 3rd in 2004-05 Divizia B.

Viorel Ion succeeded to promote Gloria Buzău to Liga I during the 2006–07 season, after finishing second. After losing the first two games of the 2007–08 season, Ion resigned his position as player-manager in favor of his colleague Ilie Stan and took on other management position with Gloria Buzău.

In 2008-2009 season he went on to be a shareholder and president of 2008-09 Liga III Petrolul Berca, the club that transformed intoFC Voluntari in 2010.

From September 2010 until November 2010 he was the manager of FC Drobeta-Turnu Severin.

In 2011-2012 season he went to manage AFC Dacia Unirea Brăila and in 2011-2012 season he managed CS Otopeni.

In 2013 he returned to FC Gloria Buzău. In 2016 Viorel Ion, alongside most of the players and coaches, was suspended for match fixing by the football federation.

== Honours ==
=== Club ===
Steaua Bucharest

- Romanian League (3): 1992–93, 1993–94, 1994–95

== Notes ==
^1 The 1987–1988, 1989–1991 appearances and goals made for Gloria Buzău are unavailable.
^2 The 1988–1989 appearances made for Gloria Buzău are unavailable.
^3 The 2001–2002 appearances and goals made for Gloria Buzău are unavailable.
