= Cătălin Tofan =

Romanian footballer

Personal information
- Date of birth: 23 December 1969 (age 56)
- Place of birth: Galaţi, Romania
- Height: 1.70 m (5 ft 7 in)
- Position: Centre back

Senior career*
Years	Team	Apps	(Gls)
1988–2003	Oțelul Galați	390	(25)
Total		390	(25)
- * Club domestic league appearances and goals as of 11 March 2010

Cătălin Tofan (born 23 December 1969) is a Romanian retired football player. His only senior club was Oțelul Galați for which he scored 25 goals in 390 matches, being a legend of "the Steelworkers". After his retirement he was appointed as an executive at the club, position he quit in January 2010.
