= Gigi Ion =

Romanian footballer and manager

Personal information
- Date of birth: 15 September 1967 (age 59)
- Place of birth: Galați, Romania
- Height: 1.85 m (6 ft 1 in)
- Positions: Defender; midfielder

Youth career
- 1978–1983: CSU Galați

Senior career*
Years	Team	Apps	(Gls)
1983–1991	Oțelul Galați (Note: The statistics for the 1983–84, 1984–85, 1985–86, 1989–90 and 1990–91 Divizia B seasons are unavailable.)	41	(3)
1991–1992	Universitatea Cluj	30	(6)
1992–1993	Ceahlăul Piatra Neamț		
1993–1994	Dacia Unirea Brăila	31	(3)
1994–1999	Oțelul Galați	134	(7)
1999–2000	SV Sandhausen		
Total		236+	(19+)

Managerial career
- 2000–2001: Oțelul Galați (caretaker)
- 2003: FC Vaslui
- 2003–2004: Dacia Unirea Brăila
- 2004–2005: Prefab 05 Modelu
- 2005: Oțelul Galați (caretaker)
- * Club domestic league appearances and goals

Gigi Ion (born 15 September 1967), also known as Ion Gigi, is a Romanian former professional football player and manager. He played as a defender or midfielder and mostly for Oțelul Galați, but he also played for other teams like Universitatea Cluj, Ceahlăul Piatra Neamț, Dacia Unirea Brăila and German side SV Sandhausen. Gigi Ion is considered a symbol of Oțelul, being introduced in 2014 by the Dunărea Bătrână publication in the top 50 legends of the club from Galați. Ion showed his attachment for Oțelul and refused an important offer from Steaua București, years later he stated: I wanted to play for Oțelul, not anywhere else. It really matters for me to feel something for the team I play, in this way I was raised. Despite his loyalty, he is considered one of the most unlucky footballers, in his career Ion suffered two double tibia and fibula fractures, first in 1987 after which he, with much sacrifice spirit, returned to the pitch, having a metal rod in his leg and the second one in 2000, injury that ended his career. After the retirement Gigi Ion worked for five years as a manager, later becoming a sports teacher.

== Honours ==
Oțelul Galați

- Divizia B: 1985–86, 1990–91

Universitatea Cluj

- Divizia B: 1991–92

Ceahlăul Piatra Neamț

- Divizia B: 1992–93

Sandhausen

- Oberliga Baden-Württemberg: 1999–2000
