= Viorel Tănase =

Romanian footballer and manager

Personal information
- Date of birth: 7 October 1970 (age 56)
- Place of birth: Galați, Romania
- Height: 1.81 m (5 ft 11 in)
- Position: Midfielder

Team information
- Current team: Oțelul Galați (head of youth development); Oțelul II Galați (head coach)

Youth career
- –1988: Oțelul Galați

Senior career*
Years	Team	Apps	(Gls)
1988–1993	Oțelul Galați	104	(18)
1993	Dinamo București	25	(1)
1994–1999	Oțelul Galați	157	(32)
1999–2001	Maccabi Netanya	67	(19)
2001–2003	Oțelul Galați	41	(5)
2003–2004	Argeș Pitești	20	(1)
2004–2007	Oțelul Galați	77	(11)
Total		491	(87)

International career
1994	Romania	1	(0)

Managerial career
- 2008–2009: Oţelul II Galați
- 2009–2011: Dunărea Galaţi
- 2012: Farul Constanța
- 2012: SC Bacău
- 2012–2013: Oțelul Galați
- 2013–2014: SC Bacău
- 2015–2016: Metalosport Galați
- 2016–2017: Cetate Deva
- 2017–2018: FCSB (assistant)
- 2019: Energeticianul
- 2022: FCSB (assistant)
- 2023: Viitorul Ianca
- 2024: Voluntari (assistant)
- 2024: Argeș Pitești (assistant)
- 2025: Concordia Chiajna (assistant)
- 2026–: Oțelul Galați (head of youth development)
- 2026–: Oțelul II Galați
- * Club domestic league appearances and goals

Viorel "Tase" Tănase (born 7 October 1970) is a Romanian football manager and former player who played as a midfielder, currently head of youth development at Liga I club Oțelul Galați and head coach at Liga III club Oțelul II Galați.

== Honours ==
=== Player ===
Oțelul Galați

- Divizia B: 1990–91
