= ASC Oțelul Galați =

Football club in Romania

Oțelul Galați
- Full name: Asociația Clubul Sportiv Suporter Club Oțelul Galați
- Nicknames: Oțelarii (The Steelworkers); Roș-alb-albaștrii (Red-White-Blues); Gălățenii (The People from Galați)
- Founded: 1964; 62 years ago 19 July 2016; 10 years ago (refounded) as Asociația Supporter Club Oțelul Galați
- Ground: Oțelul
- Capacity: 13,500
- Owners: Oțelul Galați Supporters Association; Galați Municipality
- Chairman: Cristian Munteanu
- Head coach: Rui Duarte
- League: Liga I
- 2025–26: Liga I, 9th of 16
- Website: ascotelul.ro
Home colours	Away colours	Third colours

Asociația Clubul Sportiv Supporter Club Oțelul Galați (Romanian pronunciation: [oˈt͡selul ɡaˈlat͡sʲ]), commonly known as Oțelul Galați or simply as Oțelul, is a Romanian football club based in the city of Galați, Galați County, which competes in the Liga I, the top tier of Romanian football.

Founded in 1964 as the team of the Galați steel works, Oțelul spent the first two decades of its existence in the lower leagues. It reached the Liga I for the first time in 1986, and has since amassed 27 seasons in the competition. Oțelul won the league title in the 2010–11 campaign, becoming the first and only Romanian champion from the region of Moldavia to date; this triumph was followed by winning the 2011 Supercupa României. In the Cupa României, Oțelul's best result is reaching the final twice, in 2004 and 2024.

Internationally, the team's best performances are qualifying for the group stages of the 2011–12 UEFA Champions League and being one of the eleven co-winners of the 2007 UEFA Intertoto Cup. Oțelul's team colours are red, white and blue, and they play at the namesake Stadionul Oțelul.

== History ==
=== Early years of football in Galați (1910–1964) ===
Location of Galați in Romania

Football spread to Romania shortly before 1900, first appearing in the cities of Arad and Bucharest. It arrived in Galați about 10 years later, through foreign trade companies and offices in the city, as well as the efforts of one Officer Vladovici, a career soldier who studied in France and brought football game regulations and equipment to Galați. The first games took place c. 1908, when Vladovici's team from the 3rd Artillery Regiment played groups of English sailors stationed in the harbour. A year later, the Cavalry Regiment of Galați established a second team in the city. This led to the organisation of several football matches, and the press highlighted the fact that matches were also possible with the sailors from British naval ships present in the Port of Galați. The students of Vasile Alecsandri High School (LVA) formed a team in 1919. A year later, emigrants from Turkey, Greece and Armenia set up the teams of Olimpia and Niki, consisting largely of players coming from Italy, Greece and Turkey, where football was much more developed as a sport. An exhibition match took place on 7 May 1921, in which Triumf București defeated Internaționala Galați 2–1. In the same year, the team of HMS Ladybird defeated Internaționala Galați 6–2. Though there were too few teams for organised competitions, inter-city matches intensified with Brăila, Tulcea, and Reni. There were also regular matches with local teams Internaționala, Niki, Olimpia, Şoimii Dacia, Atlas and LVA, as well as military teams.

Chart of Oțelul's yearly table positions in the Romanian Football League from 1966 to the present

In 1922, Dacia Soimii and LVA merged to found Dacia Vasile Alecsandri Galați (DVA). DVA gained great popularity and for two decades was one of the best football clubs in southern Moldavia and eastern Muntenia. Other new teams established in this era include Maccabi, Aviaţia, Şcoala Comercială, Sportul, and Baza Navală.

The new teams and increasing popularity allowed different competitions to emerge, and championships took place at the town and district level. Club structures grew with teams of seniors, reserves, youths and children. The Greek bourgeoisie teams of Ermis, Acropolis, and Foresta were created.

In 1926, the first district championship took place. There were ten teams from Galați (including the neighbourhood teams Şoimii and Gloria), two from Reni (Maccabi and Dunărea) and one team representing Tulcea. The competition was a commercial success with DVA the first champions. In the next round DVA defeated Concordia Iași 6–1 and advanced to a final tournament for the national trophy. Ten teams took part, among them Chinezul Timișoara, Unirea Tricolor București, Colțea Brașov and AMEFA Arad. Lacking experience at this level of competition, DVA lost to Brasov 1–7.

Because at that time military teams were in fashion, Captain Slătineanu transferred from Braşov the team of Fulgerul. However, due to financial difficulties, Fulgerul had a short life. 1920s regulations did not allow the team to participate in the district championships. Instead, it took part in a series of international matches and competitions. This allowed the new Galați team to gain experience playing the powerful teams MTK Budapest, Vasas, Újpest, OFK Beograd, ŽAK Subotica and Rapid Wien. These matches were played with the ticket office closed.

In the late 1920s, economic hardships led to the dissolution of most of the 20 clubs in Galați. At one time only three clubs took part in the district championship: DVA, Gloria, and Șoimii. In 1927, these latter two clubs, which had been founded as neighbourhood teams in Galați, merged as Gloria Şoimii. In 1932, at the initiative of the railroad workers, Gloria Şoimii and CFR Galați (the Galați railway football club) merged as Gloria CFR Galați.

Gloria CFR immediately joined the Lower Danube District Championship, alongside teams already experienced in official competitions such as: DVA, Ermis, Marina Danubiană and Unirea Tulcea. In the 1934–35 season, Gloria CFR were crowned champions of the Lower Danube District, and immediately promoted to Divizia C. A year later Gloria CFR were promoted to Divizia B. This promotion was possible after three promotion play-offs against Telefon Club București, but also due to the Romanian Football Federation, which recognised the value of the team. In the 1937–38 season, Gloria CFR, "the Railroad Workers", had a spectacular performance of 16 wins, a draw and a single defeat, and were promoted to Divizia A. In 1937, the club Metalosport Galați was formed in the city and had important results in the second and third leagues.

The championship schedule was interrupted by World War II and did not restart until 1946. Galați was then represented by Gloria CFR in Divizia B, while Metalosport, Şantierul Naval and FC Arsenal were in the Divizia C. In the early 1950s, DVA was dissolved due to financial problems, and Gloria CFR was relegated to Divizia C. The club Dinamo Galați (later renamed Siderurgistul Galați) was formed in 1955 and came very close to promotion to the country's top league in 1961 and 1962. Constructorul Galați was founded in 1950, and reached the Cupa României final in 1973. Siderurgistul was promoted in 1963 and was the best team in Galați until the mid-1960s.

=== Oțelul, founding and ascension (1964–1985) ===
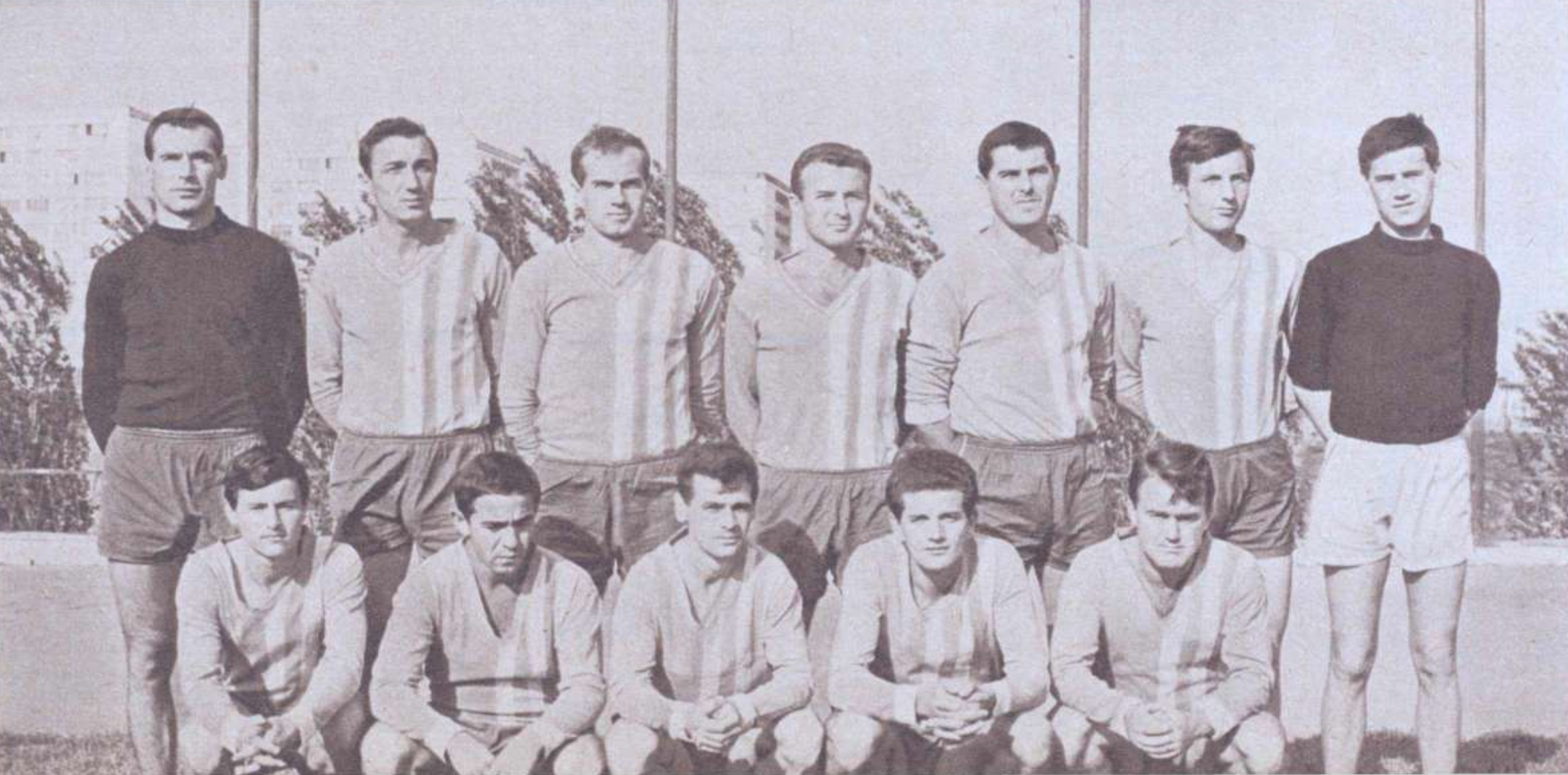
The Oțelul squad in 1967

In 1964, following the reorganisation of football in Galați, the club Oțelul was formed to represent the newly established Galați steel works. After three seasons in the County Championship, Oțelul was promoted to Divizia C at the end of the 1966–67. The next year, they were promoted to Divizia B. The 1968 promotion was a close contest with Gloria Bârlad; both teams ended the season with 35 points, but Oțelul had a +23 goal differential to Gloria's +21. Oțelul's 1968 promotion squad included: Şerbănoiu, Berechet, Rusu, Florea–Boeru, Coman, Secăşeanu, Luban, Halmagy, Moşneagu, Cernega, Bruştiuc, Niculescu, Morohai, Leca, Ion Ionică, Ailoaiei, Obreja, Câmpeanu, Drăghiescu and Ogescu; with coaches Gh. Drăghiescu and Pompiliu Ionescu.

The rise of Oțelul led to the decline of Siderurgistul, which had been the city's primary team and had played the 1963 Cupa României final. In 1967, Siderurgistul gave up its place in the second league to Politehnica Galați and disappeared from Romanian football. After two seasons in the second league, in which Oțelul finished in 9th place in 1969 and 1970, there was another reorganisation of local football. Oţelul changed its name to FC Galați and later to FCM Galați, essentially forming a new club, known later mainly as Dunărea Galați. Between 1974 and 1980, this team played three seasons in Divizia A. Meanwhile, some of the players of the former Oțelul transferred to Divizia C club Dacia Galați, which in 1972 revived the name Oțelul.

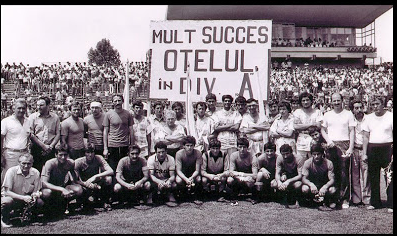
Oțelul Galați (1985–86) and the celebration of promotion

Oțelul had not completely lost its identity after this manoeuvre, and in the 1973–74 season returned to the second league, finishing 7th. The team finished the 1974–75 season in 17th place with only 24 points, and was relegated to Divizia C, then disbanded. In 1976, the management of the steel industry decided to re-establish Oțelul, joining Divizia D, and climbing to Divizia C and B. From 1976 to 1977 to 1980–81, their rankings were: 1st (Divizia D); 11th, 10th, 9th, and 1st (Divizia C). The 1980–81 squad of Oțelul included: Șerbănoiu, Călugăru, Cucu, Borș, Căstăian, Morohai, Ceacu, Ciurea, Pătrașcu, Pavel, Gheorghiu, Adamache, Ion Ionică, Basalîc, Ticu, Potorac, and Podeț; with coach Petru Moțoc.

The progress and growth of Oțelul was more difficult than that of traditional Romanian football clubs, due to the 1970 dissolution of the club in favour of Dunărea Galați, the 1972 reformation of Dacia Galați, and the 1975 refounding. In 1980, immediately after the promotion of the team to the second league, a political decision of Galați County gave Oțelul's place in Divizia B to Victoria Tecuci; some of the Oțelul players switched to the team from Tecuci, and others signed with Divizia C side Metalosport Galați, owned by the Cristea Nicolae factory. However, in the summer of 1982, there was a turnabout when Metalosport was sacrificed for Oțelul, allowing Oțelul to reach for prominence after years of being held back.

Oțelul took advantage of this political decision, finishing third in the 1982–83 season, eighth in 1983–84, and third in 1984–85 behind Petrolul Ploiești and local rival Dunărea Galați. Oțelul finished the 1984–85 season with a 24–4–6 record, 86 goals scored against 29 conceded, and were promoted to Divizia A. The squad that obtained that performance included: Călugăru, Ionel Dinu, Gh. Stamate, Oprea, Ciobanu, Popescu, Stoica, Radu, Ciurea, Burcea, Smadu, Marius Stan, A. Stamate, Petrescu, Basalic, Rusu, Claudiu Vaișcovici, Antohi, Bejenaru, Dumitru, Rotaru, Lala, Anghelinei, C. Stan, and Ralea; with coaches Constantin Rădulescu and Ioan Sdrobiş.

=== Divizia A and European competition debut (1986–1999) ===
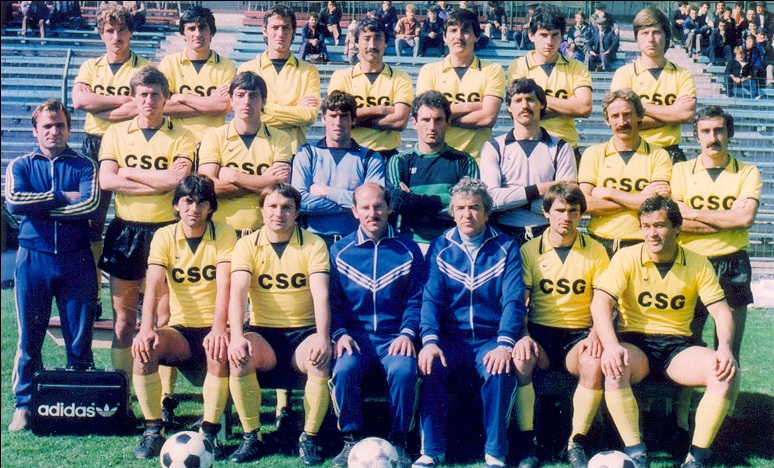
1987 Oțelul Galați team photo

In its first year in the top stage of Romanian football in 1986–87, Oţelul finished in 11th place. The next year, they finished in 4th place and qualified for the 1988–89 UEFA Cup season. In their first European Cup match, in front of 30,000 supporters, Oțelul upset Italian side Juventus 1–0, the goal scored by Ion Profir from the penalty spot. The squad that played against Juventus in the first European match of the club included: Călugăru – G. Popescu, Anghelinei, Agiu, Borali (Adrian Oprea) – Nae Burcea, Marius Stan, I. Profir, Oct. Popescu – Ralea (Drăgoi), Puiu Antohi. For Juventus: Stefano Tacconi, Nicolò Napoli, Alessandro Altobelli, Rui Barros and Michael Laudrup, with coaches Dino Zoff and Cornel Dinu. The team lost the second leg match to Juventus in Turin, 5–0, and were eliminated from the European Cup.

At the end of the 1988–1989 regular season, Oţelul was relegated. The club finished third in Divizia B in 1989–90, and lost out on promotion to rival Progresul Brăila. In the 1990–91 season, under the management of Marius Stan and Mihai Stoica, the club was promoted to Divizia A; Oțelul finished six points ahead of second-place Gloria Buzău. "The Steelworkers" remained in the top division until 2015.

Following Oțelul's 1991 promotion, the club finished in the middle of the league: 8th in 1991–92 and 10th in 1992–93. The club participated in the 1991–92 Balkans Cup and lost in the final against Turkish side Sarıyer, 0–1 on aggregate. Oțelul barely escaped relegation in the 1993–94 season, finishing one point above the relegation line. The coach was replaced with Vasile Simionaș, former star of Politehnica Iași, and after two seasons finished at 13th place. At the end of the 1995–96 season, the club lost star players Radu Cașuba and Valentin Ştefan, but maintained a foundation moving forward with players such as: Iulian Arhire, Stelian Bordieanu, Gheorghe Bosânceanu, Gheorghe Cornea, Daniel Florea, Sorin Haraga, Gigi Ion, Viorel Ion, Costin Maleș, Dănuț Oprea, Tudorel Pelin, Emil Spirea, Adrian State, Viorel Tănase and Cătălin Tofan.

The 1996–97 season brought total football to Oțelul Stadium. Led by squad captain Valentin Ştefan and Viorel Ion, Oțelul finished the season in 4th place. During the season, Oțelul beat league-leader Dinamo București 3–1. They also defeated Rapid București in a 4–3 win at Giulești Stadium, which was an historic victory for the club. Then came an unexpected 5–1 victory against FC U Craiova, which pushed Oțelul to 2nd place in the table. With a 3–1 victory at FC Național (Romania's runners-up at the end of the season), Oțelul were only 3 points behind the leader. Winning the final match 3–0 against Sportul Studențesc, Oțelul finished 4th in the league, matching their previous best finish. Vasile Simionaș was named Romanian coach of the year, and Viorel Ion and Valentin Ştefan were named to the Romanian national team.

Simionaș remained as coach in Galați for two more seasons, with the team finishing 4th place in 1997–98 and 6th in 1998–99. Highlights of this period include 14 goals scored by Valentin Ștefan as a defensive midfielder in 1997–98; a 7–0 win against Jiul Petroșani in which Maleș scored Oțelul's 400th goal in the first league; and dramatic victories against Rapid București (1–0) and Progresul București (3–2).

After finishing in 4th place in 1997, Oțelul competed in the UEFA Cup for the second time. They played in the first qualifying round against Slovenian side HIT Gorica. Oțelul lost the first leg in Slovenia, 0–2. In the second match, Oțelul led 4–0 in Galați, but Gorica scored twice at 88 and 90 minutes, with goals from Nenad Protega and Enes Demirović. The clubs were tied 4–4 on aggregate, but Gorica advanced by virtue of away goals. Oțelul qualified again for the 1998–99 UEFA Cup, and beat Macedonian side Sloga Jugomagnat 4–1 on aggregate, advancing to the second round. Oțelul lost to Vejle Boldklub of Denmark in the second round, 0–6 on aggregate.

In this period, the club earned the nicknames Cimitirul Granzilor (English: "The Giants Cemetery") and Campioana Provinciei ("The Provincial Champion"). The squad was also called Generația de Aur ("The Golden Generation"), although they were later overshadowed by the 2010–11 team. This generation could be considered one of the Oțelul's three best teams, along with the 1988 and 2011 squads. Simionaș was fired in 1999 after a conflict with sporting manager Mihai Stoica.

=== Golden Age of Oțelul (1999–2012) ===
After Simionaș was fired, Dumitru Dumitriu became the new coach. Oțelul fell to 8th place at the end of the 1999–2000 season. They dropped to 12th place in 2000–2001, but then rose to 5th place in 2001-2002, with Victor Roșca and then Marius Lăcătuș as coach.

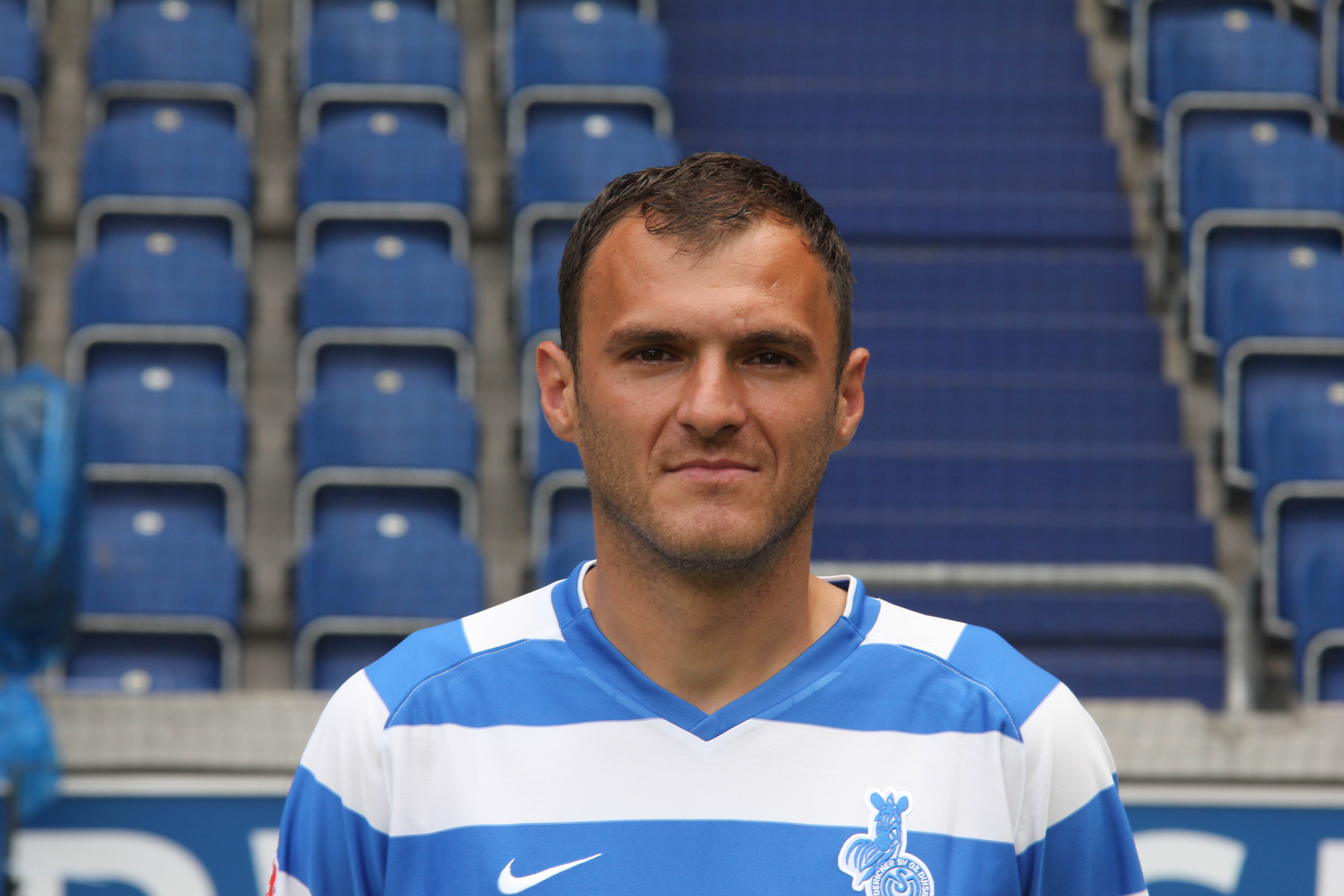
Emil Jula, Oțelul's top scorer in 2007–08

This oscillation continued in 2002–03, as Oțelul finished in 13th place and faced a relegation play-off against FC Oradea. In the first leg at Galați, the Steelworkers won 2–1, with goals scored by Gheorghe Cornea and Mihai Guriță. In the second leg at Oradea, Oțelul lost 1–3. Bogdan Vrăjitoarea scored a hat-trick for the hosts, while Viorel Tănase scored for Oțelul. Oțelul lost 3–4 on aggregate and were facing relegation. However, top division clubs Astra Ploiești and Petrolul Ploiești merged after the season, leaving a vacant place in the league table for Oțelul.

The club was then bought by Nicolai Boghici, a businessman from Galați. Oțelul had a strong 2003–04 Divizia A season under coach Sorin Cârțu, finishing in 5th place. That year, they also made the club's first appearance in the Cupa României Final, where they lost 0–2 to Dinamo București. Immediately after this final, it was discovered that the association holding the club had debts of over 15 billion Romanian leu (ROL).

Oțelul earned a spot in the 2004–05 UEFA Cup qualifying rounds. Oțelul beat Dinamo Tirana in the first round, 8–1 on aggregate, but lost in the second round, 0–1 on aggregate against Partizan.

In the 2004–05 Divizia A season Oțelul finished 8th. Marius Stan was appointed as the club's president starting in the 2005–06 season. The team struggled early in the season and was rebuilt, with coach Aurel Şunda replaced by Petre Grigoraş and 18 new players brought to the team. The changes turned the team's season around, beginning with a 3–0 victory against Dinamo, and Oțelul finished in 9th place. In the Romanian Cup, Oţelul was eliminated in the quarterfinals in penalty shoot-outs against FC Național.

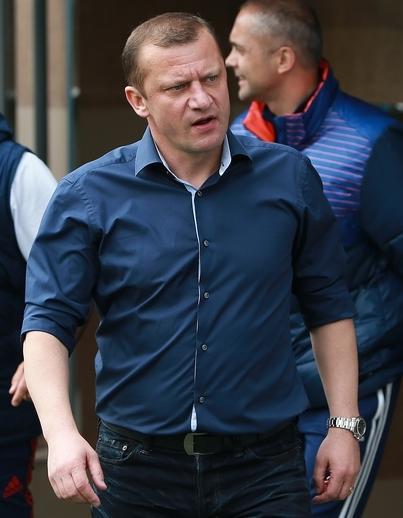
Dorinel Munteanu, the coach who led Oțelul to their only Romanian title to date

In the 2006–07 season Oțelul finished 5th in the standings. At the end of this season, prominent player Viorel Tănase retired, scoring a goal in his last match. Thanks to good positioning in the league table, the team qualified for the UEFA Intertoto Cup. In the Romanian Cup, Oțelul was once again eliminated in penalties, this time by Steaua București.

The first match of the 2007–08 season was in the UEFA Intertoto Cup, where Oțelul met Slavija Sarajevo (3rd place in the Premier League of Bosnia and Herzegovina). The first leg at Koševo Stadium ended 0–0. The second leg was played in Galați, and was an unexpected 3–0 win for Oțelul, with goals by Emil Jula (at 31 and 42 minutes) and Gabriel Paraschiv (70 min). In the next round, Oțelul faced well-known Turkish side Trabzonspor (4th place in the Süper Lig). Oţelul won the first match in Galați 2–1 in front of 5,000 spectators. Daniel Stan opened the scoring for Oţelul (28 min), and Ersen Martin tied it for Trabzonspor (83 min). The winner was scored by Oţelul's Gabriel Paraschiv (87 min). The second match was played at Hüseyin Avni Aker Stadium before more than 20,000 spectators. The Turkish side opened the scoring with a goal from 15 metres by Ceyhun Eriş (8 min). János Székely tied the matched for Oţelul five minutes later. Tadas Labukas connected with Emil Jula for a second Oţelul goal (77 min). Jula added a third goal for the Romanian side from the penalty spot in the 88th minute, and Oţelul qualified for the preliminary round of the UEFA Cup. In the UEFA Cup, Oțelul faced Lokomotiv Sofia (3rd place in the Bulgarian First League). The first leg was played at Balgarska Armia Stadium in Sofia, and Oţelul lost 1–3. The second leg finished 0–0, eliminating Oţelul from the competition.

In Liga I, Oţelul finished at 8th place. Emil Jula had the second-most goals in the league with 17. For these feats head coach Petre Grigoraș was called cel mai tare din oraș ("the best of the city").

Problems arose in the 2008–09 season. Oțelul finished 12th, and the club was close to bankruptcy. Petre Grigoraş left the following season and was replaced by Dorinel Munteanu. In the 2009–10 season, Oțelul finished in 8th place.

Oțelul achieved its best performance in the 2010–11 season, winning the first league, defeating main rival FC Timişoara in a match that decided the title. Two months later, the club won the Supercupa României in a 1–0 victory over Steaua București. The squad which won included: goalkeepers Branko Grahovac, Cristian Brăneţ, and Gabriel Abraham; defenders Cornel Râpă, Samoel Cojoc, Cristian Sîrghi, Milan Perendija, Sergiu Costin, Enes Šipović, Constantin Mișelăricu, Adrian Salageanu, and Silviu Ilie; midfielders Ionuț Neagu, Gabriel Giurgiu, Ioan Filip, Ciprian Milea, Liviu Antal, Laurenţiu Iorga, Laurenţiu Petean, John Ibeh, Gabriel Viglianti, Răzvan Ochiroşii, Laurenţiu Buş, and Gabriel Paraschiv; and forwards Marius Pena, Bratislav Punoševac and Róbert Elek; with coach Dorinel Munteanu.

In the 2011–12 season Oțelul finished in 6th place, and also played in the UEFA Champions League group stage for the first time. Their Champions League group featured Manchester United, Benfica and FC Basel. It was a huge moment for the club to play against top European teams, but Oțelul lost all six matches: 2–3 and 0–1 against Basel; 1–2 and 0–1 against Benfica; and 0–2 in both matches against Manchester United.

=== Decline and bankruptcy (2012–2016) ===
Oțelul's 50th anniversary logo, used between 2014 and 2016

After two fantastic seasons, Oțelul faced difficulty as the club's shareholders wanted the money the club had received for Champions League participation.

In the 2012–13 season, Marius Stan left to become mayor of Galați, and Dan Adamescu became the new owner of the club. Oțelul lost Dorinel Munteanu as coach. Viorel Tănase, a star player who had retired in 2007, was named as his replacement. Tănase managed to finish the first part of the season outside the relegation zone, but during the winter break was replaced with Petre Grigoraş. Oțelul finished 11th with 43 points. In the Romanian Cup, they reached the semi-finals, where they were eliminated by Petrolul, the winner of the competition.

On 10 July 2013, despite the €22 million earned from its participation in the Champions League the previous season, Oțelul went into insolvency.

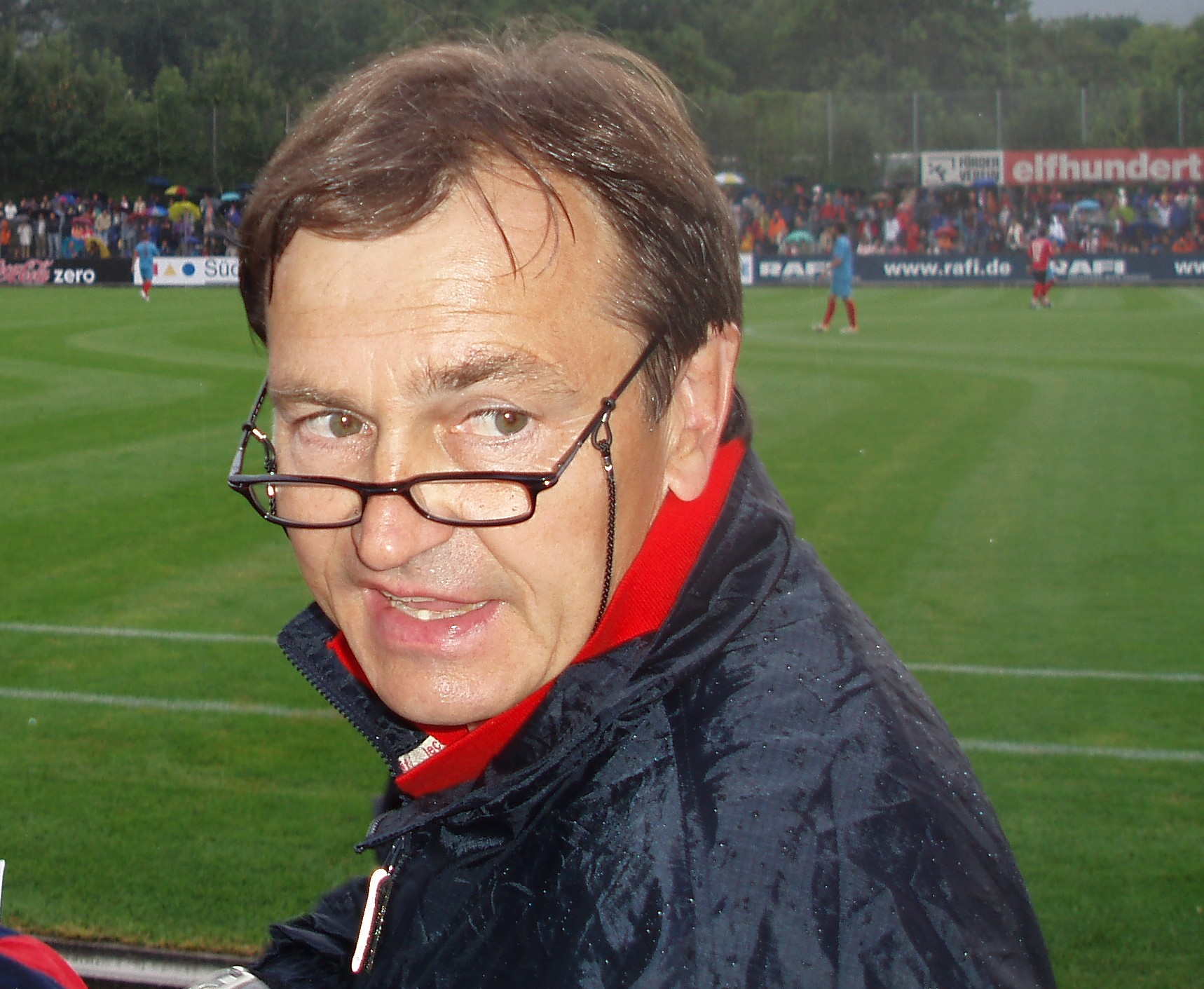
Ewald Lienen, the coach who saved Oțelul from relegation in 2014, despite a difficult financial situation

Grigoraş left the club at the end of the 2013–14 season, and Ionuţ Badea was hired for the new season. Poor results led to Badea's resignation and the arrival of Ewald Lienen, a German coach trained in the Bundesliga. He managed to finish the season with Oțelul in 10th place. After this season, Lienen and almost all of the players left due to financial mismanagement. The 2014–15 season brought huge changes at Oțelul. Team owner Dan Adamescu was arrested in a case of bribery, and a lack of financing made transfers difficult. Among the coaches brought in and subsequently fired were: Michael Weiß, Tibor Selymes and Florin Marin. Additionally, Liga I reorganised so the bottom six teams in the table were relegated instead of just four. Oțelul finished 17th and was relegated to Liga II after 23 consecutive seasons in the top flight of the Romanian football. Oțelul played 27 seasons in Liga I, holding 16th place in the Liga I All-time table. Oțelul is the second-best Moldovan team in this ranking, surpassed only by FCM Bacău, but it is the only Moldovan side to win a national title.

The next season in Liga II was painful one for many of Oțelul's fans. The team had to play many games with their youth squad, and finished last in the second league. Relegation was followed by the club's bankruptcy, declared on 1 April 2016 by the Bucharest Tribunal. Less than 5 years after winning the first champion title, the club had suddenly disappeared.

The fall of Oțelul gave rise to many concerns in the Romanian media. In 2016, Marius Stan accused Adamescu for the devaluation of the club:

Adamescu took, without paying anything, a patrimony club of Galați, which accounts had €7.3 million and zero debts, a unique case in Romania! The sole purpose of the shareholders was to devalue the club by the millions that were in the account when it was taken over!"

In 2017, Adamescu's son, Alexander Adamescu, accused Stan of defective management and that the club was his piggybank:

FCO's activity was blocked by ANAF a few months after the takeover by The Nova Group [Adamescu's company], the decision based on the financial reporting of the old management of the club. In the 9 months we had available until the entry of FCO into insolvency, we were unable to change the ongoing contracts, which were concluded in exorbitant amounts also by the old management, and the much higher expenditures compared to the revenues led to the club's closing. The Nova Group has lost on this deal, it has not gotten the 'millions' of the euro – and that for the simple fact that it did not exist"

=== Refounding and returning to the top flight (2016–present) ===
After the dissolution of the club, Oțelul supporters immediately founded a new association, called Asociația Supporter Club Oțelul Galați, and registered it to compete in Liga IV. On 19 July 2016, ASC Oțelul Galați was officially born with the objective of continuing the tradition of Oțelul in Galați.

ASC Oțelul Galați was considered the spiritual successor of the old club because it wore the same colours, it played in the same stadium and was supported by the same fans. The new entity, didn't own the brand and league record of the old club, which had been bought at auction for €10,000. However, the winner of the auction did not pay the bid which became void. With the aid of a law firm, ASC Oțelul gained possession of the record and brand and became the official successor of the club on 12 September 2017.

At the end of its first season, Oțelul won Liga IV – Galați County and defeated the champions of Iași County, Unirea Mircești, in a play-off to win promotion to the Liga III. Under coach Stelian Bordeianu, a former player of the club, Oțelul won 30 of its 32 matches in all competitions, setting a record for Romanian football.

Former Oțelul coach Dorinel Munteanu returned at the beginning of the 2021–22 season and helped secure promotion after five years in Liga III. Oțelul dominated both the regular season and the playoffs, finishing first in Liga III Seria 2, nine points clear of 2nd-place Focșani. In the playoff semifinal, Oțelul got past Foresta Suceava with a 1–0 victory in Suceava, and a 2–0 win in Galaṭi. The first leg of the final, played in Botoșani against Dante Botoșani, ended in a 1–1 tie. The decisive match was played in Galați, in front of a crowd of 13,000 spectators on Stadionul Oțelul. George Cârjan, Alin Nica and Denis Cires scored in a 3–0 win for Oțelul that propelled the steelworkers into Liga II.

Oțelul with Dorinel Munteanu at the helm, took this momentum well into the 2022–23 season, in Liga II. Although newly promoted at this level, the Galați team proved to be a real contender as the regular season went on. They finished 3rd in the regular season and qualified for the promotion playoffs. The steelworkers managed to keep their form during the play-off and before the final day, were still 3rd, behind Poli Iasi and Steaua Bucuresti. On the last day, Oțelul got the win they needed against Unirea Dej (1-0 Răzvan Gorovei), in front of a packed Oțelul stadium. The 3rd spot finish, coupled with Steaua's (2nd) legal limitations, sealed a historic comeback to the elite for the steelworkers, 8 years after their previous Liga I match.

The first season back in the elite was 2023–24. During this season, Oțelul with the same Dorinel Munteanu as head coach managed to prove wrong most of the certain relegation pre-season predictions. Oțelul finished the regular Liga I season 11th out of 16. In the relegation playout phase, results were even better, granting a 2nd-place finish in the playout, 8th in the final general Liga I table. This position also enabled the team to qualify for the UEFA Conference League playoffs semifinals which they lost against U Cluj. In the Romanian Cup, Oțelul stunned most pundits with a run to the final, eliminating better tipped teams on the way like Universitatea Craiova or U Cluj. The final, against Liga II participant Corvinul Hunedoara was a surprise in the negative sense for Oțelul, losing on penalties after a hard-fought 2–2 after extra time in Sibiu. 3500 supporters made the long trip from Galați to Sibiu, the full number of tickets available to them.

The 2024–25 season brought three head coaches. Dorinel Munteanu resigned on 30 December 2024, citing the club's financial problems. Ovidiu Burcă left on 19 March 2025 after ten matches (two wins, two draws, six losses),and was replaced by László Balint. FIFA also imposed a transfer registration ban on the club over unpaid dues owed to former player Samy Bourard. Top scorers that season were Frédéric Maciel and Răzvan Tănasă, with six goals each.

Under Balint, the team finished the regular 2025–26 season 10th of 16 after a 4–0 defeat to Universitatea Cluj on 27 February 2026, entering the relegation play-out. Balint resigned on 14 March 2026 after an opening play-out defeat to Csíkszereda, and was replaced three days later by Croatian coach Stjepan Tomas. The club also withdrew its UEFA licence application for 2026–27, citing around €835,000 in unpaid wages. Tomas guided the team to a 3rd-place finish in the play-out group, 9th overall in the final Liga I table.

His contract's extension option was triggered automatically, keeping him in charge for 2026–27, a season Oțelul opened at home to CFR Cluj on 18 July 2026. On 22 September 2026, SC Oțelul Galați and manager Stjepan Tomas mutually agreed to terminate their contractual relationship.

On 28 September 2026, Portuguese manager Rui Duarte signed a contract with Oțelul Galați, which runs until 30 June 2027.

== Youth program ==
The youth academy of Oțelul Galați developed young players including: Iulian Arhire, Florin Cernat, Romulus Chihaia, Daniel Florea, Silviu Ilie, Laurențiu Iorga, George Miron, Ionuț Neagu, Dănuț Oprea, Cornel Râpă, Viorel Tănase, Cătălin Tofan, or Alexandru Tudorie. Their local rival is the Dunărea Galați football academy, from which many important footballers developed.

=== Reserves team ===
Oțelul II Galați was a Romanian professional football club that functioned as the reserve team for Oțelul. Founded in 2007, the team competed in the Liga III, the third tier of the Romanian football league system. Oțelul II disbanded in early 2015 due to financial difficulties. Following the team's closure, most players signed for local Liga III club Metalosport. During their brief existence, Oțelul II's best league finish was a second-place position achieved in the 2008–09 Liga III season.

Former managers include Viorel Tănase (2008–2009), Dan Dobai, Ion Basalîc, Constantin Schumacher and Daniel Florea (both 2013).

Youth teams were gradually reintroduced into Romanian Football Federation (FRF) competitions, re-establishing the development pathway between junior and senior football.

Players such as Alexandru Moraliu, David Mirică, Dumitru Cristian Portasă, Denis Bîrlea, Vladimir Doroftei and other academy players were considered part of the academy’s elite youth group, being regularly involved in higher-level youth squads. team selections. Several of them were included in Romania youth national team call-ups, reflecting their development status within the club’s academy structure.

The U17 team has also achieved strong regional performances in national youth competitions, with players such as Andrei Pașcanu, Mario Lamandi, David Grozea, Iustinian Ilica, Rareș Călin, Robert Cojoc, Roberto Tufă, Roberto Alexandru, Yanis Malone, Yanis Sin, Marian Docuz, David Voinea, Ioan Butuc, Damian Iorga, Ștefan Neagu, Dragoș Aftene, Ciprian Vasile, Matei Vișan, Ștefan Dimofte, Mihai Munteanu, Radu Mândrea, Andrei Lupu, Robert Vărdaru, Darius Grigoriță, Sebastian Ciucă, David Iurea, and David Dominteanu. Dragoș Aftene later making his first debut to the senior team.

== Grounds ==
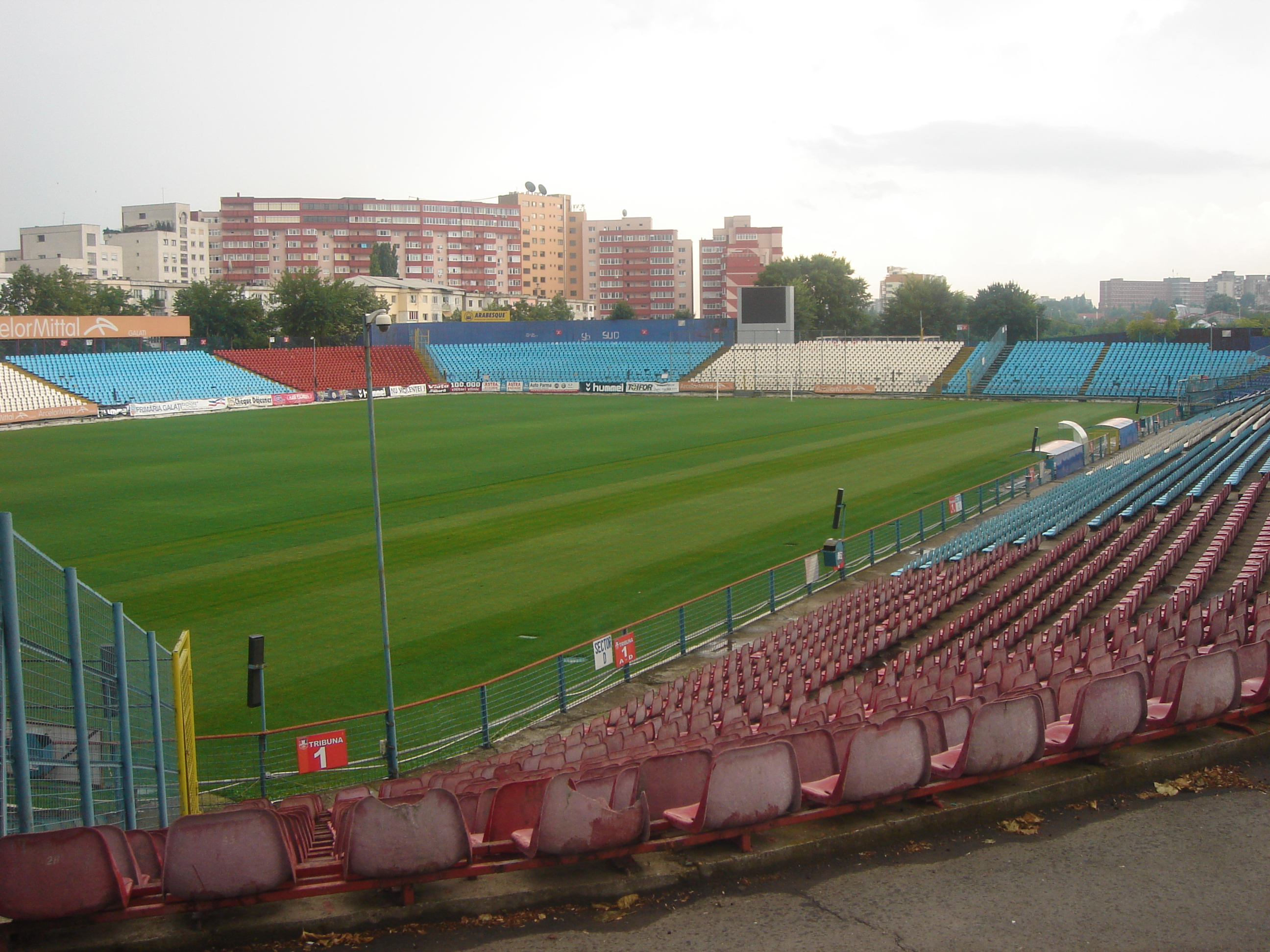
Oțelul Stadium

The club plays its home matches at Stadionul Oțelul in Galați. Oțelul has also used other local venues, such as Stadionul Nicolae Rainea, Stadionul Siderurgistul, and Baza Sportivă Zoltan David, but only for short periods of time.

In December 2025, ownership of the stadium passed from the debt-ridden Liberty Galați steelworks to Galați Municipality, in a deal worth over €3 million, with the club retaining usage rights. The municipality has since planned to renovate the ground to an 18,000-seat capacity, in stages so the team is not displaced during construction.

In October 2023, the club's shirt sponsor became MrBit România, a sports betting operator, for the 2023–24 season with an option to extend.

== Support ==
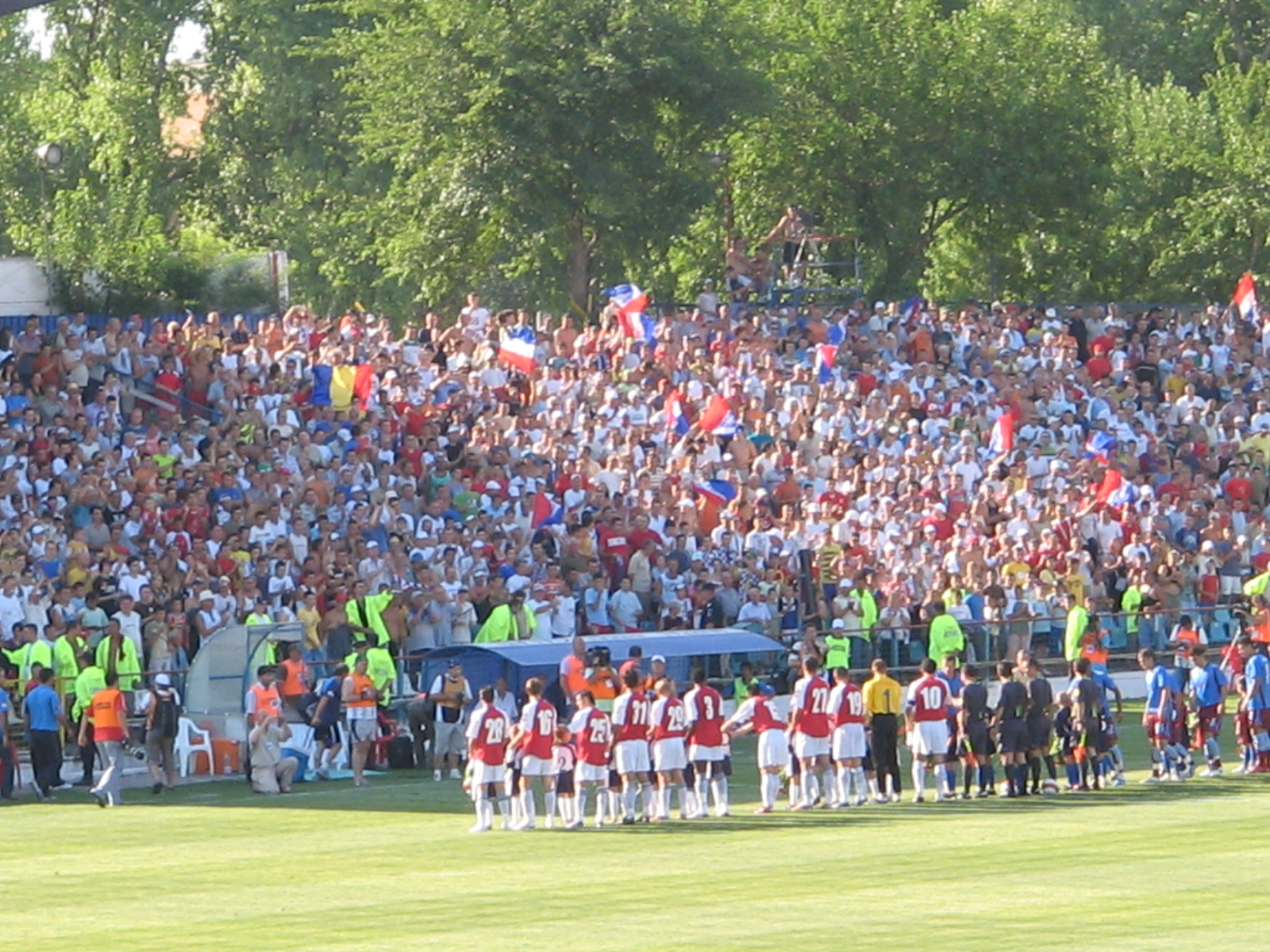
Oţelul supporters in 2007

Oțelul has many supporters in Galați and Galați County, but also in the region of southern Moldavia. Oțelul Galați has groups of ultras, including Steel Boys, Ultra Sud, Sidexplozia, SCOG and New Order. Regular fans that are not affiliated with any ultras groups can join the Liga Suporterilor Gălăţeni 1993 (The Galați Supporters League 1993) organisation. After the 2016 dissolution of the club, Oțelul fans from the aforementioned groups founded Supporter Club Oțelul Galați and enrolled the team in the Liga IV; this action kept the club from disappearing, and their actions proved the attachment of the fans to the red, white and blue side.

=== Rivalries ===
The main rivals of Oțelul Galați are Dacia Unirea Brăila, who they face in a competition known as Derby-ul Dunării de Jos ("The Lower Danube Derby"). Any Galați–Brăila match is considered a derby, taking this term from a regional derby in the early years of football. Another important local rivalry is against Dunărea Galați, a club born from the break-up of Oțelul in the 1960s. Oţelul fans also share a rivalry with Poli Iaşi supporters, following a series of clashes between the two sets of fans. A much newer rivalry is one against FC Vaslui. During periods of success, Oțelul has had contextual rivalries with Steaua București, Dinamo București and Rapid București, especially in the 1990s, as well as with Politehnica Timișoara between 2010 and 2011.

== Honours ==
=== Domestic ===
==== Leagues ====
- Liga I
  - Winners (1): 2010–11
- Divizia B / Liga II
  - Winners (2): 1985–86, 1990–91
- Divizia C / Liga III
  - Winners (4): 1967–68, 1980–81, 2020–21, 2021–22
  - Runners-up (1): 1972–73
- Divizia D / Liga IV – Galați County
  - Winners (2): 1976–77, 2016–17

==== Cups ====
- Cupa României
  - Runners-up (2): 2003–04, 2023–24
- Supercupa României
  - Winners (1): 2011

=== European ===
- UEFA Intertoto Cup
  - Co-winners (1): 2007

== Players ==
=== First team squad ===
As of 12 September 2026

Note: Flags indicate national team as defined under FIFA eligibility rules; some limited exceptions apply. Players may hold more than one non-FIFA nationality.

No.	Pos.	Nation	Player
1	GK	ROU	Cosmin Dur-Bozoancă (vice-captain)
2	DF	BUL	Milen Zhelev
3	DF	GRE	Giannis Christopoulos
4	DF	POR	Né Lopes
5	DF	CIV	Habib Sylla
6	DF	ROU	Paul Iacob (captain)
7	FW	CPV	João Paulino
8	MF	POR	Rafael Brito
9	FW	CPV	Patrick
10	FW	POR	Andrézinho
11	FW	GBS	Zé Turbo
12	GK	ROU	Darius Paharnicu
13	GK	ROU	Mario Contra
14	MF	ROU	Robert Cojoc

No.	Pos.	Nation	Player
15	FW	ROU	Cristian Neicu
16	DF	ROU	Dan Neicu
17	MF	ROU	Andrei Ciobanu
18	MF	ROU	Dragoș Aftene
19	FW	ROU	Radu Postelnicu
20	DF	ROU	Robert Olteanu
24	FW	ROU	Denis Bordun
27	MF	POR	Pedro Nuno
28	DF	POR	Miguel Silva
30	MF	ROU	Matei Frunză
39	MF	MDA	Teodor Lungu
44	DF	CAN	Dominick Zator
77	FW	ROU	Viorel Bălănică
88	DF	BRA	Kazu

=== Out on loan ===
Note: Flags indicate national team as defined under FIFA eligibility rules; some limited exceptions apply. Players may hold more than one non-FIFA nationality.

No. / Pos. / Nation / Player; — / GK / ROU / Giulio Munteanu (at Sporting Liești until 30 June 2027)	No. / Pos. / Nation / Player; — / MF / ROU / David Butuc (at CSM Adjud 1946 until 30 June 2027)

== Club officials ==
=== Board of directors ===
Role	Name
Owners	(Romania) Oțelul Galați Supporters Association (Romania) Galați Municipality
Chairman	(Romania) Cristian Munteanu
Economist	(Romania) Filote Culița
Secretary	(Romania) Geanina Tătaru
Advocate	(Romania) Constantin Savin
Head of order and safety	(Romania) Aurel Brașoveanu
Ticketing director	(Romania) Bogdan Juravlea
Sporting director	(Romania) Cristian Sîrghi
Delegate	(Romania) George Cârjan
Head of youth development	(Romania) Viorel Tănase
Team manager	(Romania) Ionuț Neagu
Press officer	(Romania) Dănuț Lungu
Photographer	(Romania) Valentin Munteanu

- Last updated: 4 July 2026

=== Current technical staff ===
Role	Name
Head coach	(Portugal) Rui Duarte
Assistant coach	(Portugal) Neca
Goalkeeping coach	(Romania) Cristian Moldovan
Fitness coach	(Portugal) Frederico Carmo
Video analyst	(Portugal) Mauro Bastos
Club doctor	(Romania) Ionuț Drilea
Physiotherapist	(Romania) Marius Matei (Romania) Alexandru Huhulea
Masseurs	(Romania) Constantin Crăciun (Romania) Petrișor Bălan
Kit man	(Romania) Iulian Dogaru
Nutritionist	(Romania) Alexandru Buză

- Last updated: 28 September 2026

== League history ==
Season	Tier	Division	Place	National Cup
2026–27	1	Liga I	TBD	Play-off Round
2025–26	1	Liga I	9th	Group Stage
2024–25	1	Liga I	8th	Group Stage
2023–24	1	Liga I	8th	Final
2022–23	2	Liga II	3rd (P)	Group Stage
2021–22	3	Liga III (Seria II)	1st (C, P)	Third Round
2020–21	3	Liga III (Seria II)	1st (C)	Second Round
2019–20	3	Liga III (Seria I)	6th	Third Round
2018–19	3	Liga III (Seria I)	3rd	Third Round
2017–18	3	Liga III (Seria I)	3rd	–
2016–17	4	Liga IV (GL)	1st (C, P)	County Phase
2015–16	2	Liga II (Seria I)	13th (R)	Fifth Round
2014–15	1	Liga I	17th (R)	Round of 16
2013–14	1	Liga I	10th	Quarter-finals
2012–13	1	Liga I	11th	Semi-finals
2011–12	1	Liga I	6th	Quarter-finals
2010–11	1	Liga I	1st (C)	Round of 32
2009–10	1	Liga I	8th	Round of 16
2008–09	1	Liga I	12th	Round of 16
2007–08	1	Liga I	8th	Round of 16
2006–07	1	Liga I	5th	Quarter-finals
2005–06	1	Divizia A	9th	Quarter-finals
2004–05	1	Divizia A	8th	Quarter-finals
2003–04	1	Divizia A	5th	Final
2002–03	1	Divizia A	13th	Round of 32
2001–02	1	Divizia A	5th	Round of 32
2000–01	1	Divizia A	12th	Quarter-finals
1999–00	1	Divizia A	8th	Semi-finals

Season	Tier	Division	Place	National Cup
1998–99	1	Divizia A	6th	Quarter-finals
1997–98	1	Divizia A	4th	Quarter-finals
1996–97	1	Divizia A	4th	Round of 16
1995–96	1	Divizia A	13th	Round of 16
1994–95	1	Divizia A	13th	Round of 16
1993–94	1	Divizia A	15th	Round of 32
1992–93	1	Divizia A	10th	Round of 32
1991–92	1	Divizia A	8th	Round of 16
1990–91	2	Divizia B (Seria I)	1st (C, P)	Round of 32
1989–90	2	Divizia B (Seria I)	3rd	
1988–89	1	Divizia A	16th (R)	Round of 32
1987–88	1	Divizia A	4th	Round of 32
1986–87	1	Divizia A	11th	Quarter-finals
1985–86	1	Divizia B (Seria I)	1st (C, P)	Quarter-finals
1984–85	2	Divizia B (Seria I)	3rd	
1983–84	2	Divizia B (Seria I)	8th	
1982–83	2	Divizia B (Seria I)	3rd	
1981–82	3	Divizia C	1st (C, P)	
1980–81	3	Divizia C	1st (C, P)	
1979–80	3	Divizia C	9th	
1978–79	3	Divizia C	10th	
1977–78	3	Divizia C	11th	
1976–77	4	Divizia D	1st (C, P)	
-	-	-	-	
1974–75	2	Divizia B	17th (R)	
1973–74	2	Divizia B (Seria I)	7th	
1972–73	3	Divizia C	1st (C, P)	

== Notable former players ==
The footballers enlisted below have had international cap(s) for their respective countries at junior and/or senior level and/or more than 100 caps for ASC Oțelul Galați.

Romania

- (Romania) Mario Agiu
- (Romania) Liviu Antal
- (Romania) Iulian Apostol
- (Romania) Eugen Baștină
- (Romania) Eric Bicfalvi
- (Romania) Gabriel Boștină
- (Romania) Alexandru Bourceanu
- (Romania) Vasile Brătianu
- (Romania) George Cârjan
- (Romania) Florin Cernat
- (Romania) Romulus Chihaia
- (Romania) Horațiu Cioloboc
- (Romania) Samuel Cojoc
- (Romania) Sergiu Costin
- (Romania) Gheorghe Dumitrașcu
- (Romania) Ioan Filip
- (Romania) Daniel Florea
- (Romania) Ramses Gado
- (Romania) Sorin Ghionea
- (Romania) Gabriel Giurgiu
- (Romania) Mihai Guriță
- (Romania) Victoraș Iacob
- (Romania) Silviu Ilie
- (Romania) Gigi Ion
- (Romania) Viorel Ion
- (Romania) Laurențiu Iorga
- (Romania) Silviu Iorgulescu
- (Romania) Emil Jula
- (Romania) Costin Maleș
- (Romania) Cosmin Mărginean
- (Romania) Andrei Miron
- (Romania) Cristian Munteanu
- (Romania) Ștefan Nanu
- (Romania) Ionuț Neagu
- (Romania) Răzvan Ochiroșii
- (Romania) George Ogăraru
- (Romania) Dănuț Oprea
- (Romania) Gabriel Paraschiv
- (Romania) Tudorel Pelin
- (Romania) Marius Pena
- (Romania) Cornel Râpă
- (Romania) Andrei Rus
- (Romania) Adrian Sălăgeanu
- (Romania) Cristian Sîrghi
- (Romania) Marius Stan
- (Romania) János Székely
- (Romania) Valentin Ștefan
- (Romania) Viorel Tănase
- (Romania) Cătălin Tofan
- (Romania) Adrian Toma
- (Romania) Alexandru Tudorie
- (Romania) Claudiu Vaișcovici

Algeria

- (Algeria) Jugurtha Hamroun

Argentina

- (Argentina) Gabriel Viglianti

Armenia

- (Armenia) (Romania) Marian Zeciu

Bosnia and Herzegovina

- (Bosnia and Herzegovina) Branko Grahovac
- (Bosnia and Herzegovina) Enes Šipović

Bulgaria

- (Bulgaria) Stoyan Kolev
- (Bulgaria) Zhivko Zhelev

Burkina Faso

- (Burkina Faso) Salif Nogo
- (Burkina Faso) François Yabré

Brazil

- (Brazil) Didi
- (Brazil) Marquinhos

Cape Verde

- (Cape Verde) Hélder Tavares
- (Cape Verde) João Paulo

Croatia

- (Croatia) Diego Živulić

Italy

- (Italy) Juri Cisotti

Lithuania

- (Lithuania) Tadas Labukas

Nigeria

- (Nigeria) (Romania) Kehinde Fatai
- (Nigeria) John Ibeh

Panama

- (Panama) Armando Cooper

Portugal

- (Portugal) João Lameira
- (Portugal) Frédéric Maciel
- (Portugal) Miguel Silva
- (Portugal) Samuel Teles

Serbia

- (Serbia) Zoran Ljubinković
- (Serbia) Milan Perendija
- (Serbia) Bratislav Punoševac

Slovenia

- (Slovenia) Jaka Štromajer

Uruguay

- (Uruguay) Mauro Goicoechea

== Notable former managers ==
- (Romania) Sorin Cârțu
- (Romania) Gheorghe Constantin
- (Romania) Cornel Dinu
- (Romania) Dumitru Dumitriu
- (Romania) Petre Grigoraș
- (Romania) Traian Ivănescu
- (Romania) Marius Lăcătuș
- (Germany) Ewald Lienen
- (Romania) Ion Moldovan
- (Romania) Dorinel Munteanu
- (Romania) Angelo Niculescu
- (Romania) Costel Orac
- (Romania) Constantin Rădulescu
- (Romania) Vasile Simionaș
- (Romania) Aurel Țicleanu
