= 2015–16 Liga II =

Liga II
- Season: 2015–16
- Country: Romania
- Teams: 28
- Promoted: Rapid București; Gaz Metan Mediaș
- Relegated: Gloria Buzău; Rapid Suceava; Universitatea Cluj; Bucovina; Tărlungeni; Ceahlăul; Metalul Reșița; Oțelul Galați; Bihor Oradea; Dorohoi; Caransebeș
- Matches: 458
- Goals: 1,225 (2.67 per match)
- Top goalscorer: (Seria I); Valentin Alexandru (25) (Seria II); Marius Matei (23)
- Biggest home win: Brașov 11-2 Metalul
- Biggest away win: Farul 0-6 Dunărea
- Highest scoring: Brașov 11-2 Metalul
- Longest winning run: 7 matches: Gaz Metan Mediaș
- Longest unbeaten run: 16 matches: Rapid București
- Longest winless run: 20 matches: Caransebeș
- Longest losing run: 16 matches: Caransebeș
- Highest attendance: 8,500; Rapid 3–1 Academica (22 May 2016)
- Lowest attendance: 20; Metalul 1–6 Vâlcea (21 November 2015)
- Average attendance: 921
- All statistics correct as of 12 June 2016.

The 2015–16 Liga II was the 76th season of the Liga II, the second tier of the Romanian football league system. The season began on 29 August.

The 28 teams were divided in two series (with 14 teams each). The regular season was played in a round-robin tournament. The first six teams from each series played a play-off for promotion to Liga I. Because of switching to a system with just one series of 22 teams from next season, there will be 11 teams relegated from Liga II this year. After the regular season, the last two teams in each series relegated to Liga III; the last 3 teams in each play-out pool also relegated, while the 3rd placed teams in the play-out faced off in a game that determined the 11th relegated team.

== Team changes ==
At the end of 2014–15 season, Voluntari from Seria I and Poli Timișoara from Seria II were promoted to Liga I.
Four teams were relegated to Liga III: Unirea Slobozia and Săgeata Năvodari (Seria I), Olt Slatina and Fortuna Poiana Câmpina (Seria II).
Last six teams from 2014–15 Liga I were relegated to Liga II: Gaz Metan Mediaș, Brașov, Universitatea Cluj, Rapid București, Oțelul Galați, Ceahlăul Piatra Neamț.
The winners of the five 2014–15 Liga III series were promoted to Liga II: Bucovina Pojorâta, Dunărea Călărași, Chindia Târgoviște, UTA Arad and Baia Mare.

=== Renamed teams ===
Academica Argeș was moved back to Clinceni and renamed Academica Clinceni.
CF Brăila was renamed Dacia Unirea Brăila.

=== Stadia by capacity and locations ===
Location of teams in 2015–16 Liga II - Seria I

Club	City	Stadium	Capacity
Academica	Clinceni	Clinceni	2,800
Bacău	Bacău	Letea	2,000
Balotești	Balotești	Central	3,780
Berceni	Berceni	Berceni	2,700
Bucovina	Pojorâta	Pojorâta	1,000
Ceahlăul	Piatra Neamț	Ceahlăul	18,000
Dacia Unirea	Brăila	Municipal	20,154
Dorohoi	Dorohoi	Municipal	2,000
Dunărea	Călărași	Ion Comșa	10,400
Farul	Constanța	Farul	15,520
Gloria	Buzău	Municipal	18,000
Oțelul	Galați	Oțelul; Nicolae Rainea	13,500; 23,000
Rapid	București	Giulești-Valentin Stănescu	11,704
Rapid CFR	Suceava	Areni	12,500

=== Personnel and kits ===
Note: Flags indicate national team as has been defined under FIFA eligibility rules. Players and Managers may hold more than one non-FIFA nationality.

Team	Manager	Captain	Kit manufacturer	Shirt sponsor
Academica Clinceni	(Romania) Mugur Bolohan	(Romania) Andrei Marinescu	Joma	Imamed
Bacău	(Romania) Cristian Popovici	(Romania) Bogdan Miron	Nike	Sir Safety
Balotești	(Romania) Cornel Nica	(Romania) Ionuţ Sandu	Onze Sport	—
Berceni	(Romania) Răzvan Rotaru	(Romania) Epaminonda Nicu	Givova	—
Bucovina Pojorâta	(Romania) Daniel Mândrilă	(Romania) Traian Jarda	Legea	—
Ceahlăul Piatra Neamț	(Romania) Lidi Chertic	(Romania) Alexandru Barna	Gems	Getica 95, Rifil
Dacia Unirea Brăila	(Romania) Alin Pânzaru	(Romania) Sorin Frunză	Joma	Comision Trade
Dorohoi	—	—	—	—
Dunărea Călărași	(Romania) Adrian Mihalcea	(Romania) Bogdan Panait	Joma	Prosol
Farul Constanța	(Romania) Ion Barbu	(Romania) Florin Pătrașcu	Legea	—
Gloria Buzău	(Romania) Viorel Ion	(Romania) Cătălin Vlaicu	Givova	—
Oțelul Galați	(Romania) Sorin Haraga	(Romania) Robert Ciurea	Adidas	—
Rapid București	(Romania) Dan Alexa	(Romania) Nicolae Vasile	Puma	Azuga Waters
Rapid CFR Suceava	(Romania) Daniel Bălan	(Romania) Dorin Semeghin	Givova	Primăria și Consiliul Local Suceava

=== Managerial changes ===
Team	Outgoing manager	Manner of departure	Date of vacancy	Position in table	Incoming manager	Date of appointment
Ceahlăul	(Serbia) Vanja Radinović	Mutual agreement	31 May 2015	Pre-season	(Romania) Constantin Ilie	21 July 2015
Academica	(Romania) Ciprian Urican	Mutual agreement	30 June 2015	Pre-season	(Romania) László Balint	2 July 2015
Berceni	(Romania) Adrian Mihalcea	Mutual agreement	30 June 2015	Pre-season	(Romania) Marin Dragnea	13 July 2015
Balotești	(Italy) Giovanni Pisano	Mutual agreement	30 June 2015	Pre-season	(Romania) Bogdan Pătrașcu	18 July 2015
Rapid București	(Italy) Cristiano Bergodi	End of contract	30 June 2015	Pre-season	(Romania) Florin Marin	24 July 2015
Rapid București	(Romania) Florin Marin	Signed by Poli Timișoara	24 August 2015	Pre-season	(Romania) Dan Alexa	28 August 2015
Dorohoi	(Romania) Vespazian Colban	The club was dissolved	29 August 2015	Pre-season	—	—
Berceni	(Romania) Marin Dragnea	Sacked	3 October 2015	13	(Romania) Epaminonda Nicu (caretaker)	6 October 2015
Ceahlăul	(Romania) Constantin Ilie	Resigned	4 October 2015	11	(Romania) Mihai Ionescu (caretaker)	4 October 2015
Ceahlăul	(Romania) Mihai Ionescu (caretaker)	End of tenure as a caretaker	29 October 2015	13	(Italy) Simone Mazzali	29 October 2015
Balotești	(Romania) Bogdan Pătrașcu	Mutual agreement	11 November 2015	9	(Romania) Emil Stanca (caretaker)	11 November 2015
Berceni	(Romania) Epaminonda Nicu (caretaker)	End of tenure as a caretaker	21 November 2015	9	(Romania) Marian Rada	21 November 2015
Ceahlăul	(Italy) Simone Mazzali	Sacked	23 November 2015	13	(Romania) Lidi Chertic	23 November 2015
Rapid Suceava	(Romania) Bogdan Tudoreanu	Mutual agreement	20 December 2015	8	(Romania) Constantin Ilie	21 December 2015
Balotești	(Romania) Emil Stanca (caretaker)	End of tenure as a caretaker	14 January 2016	10	(Romania) Cornel Nica	14 January 2016
Ceahlăul	(Romania) Lidi Chertic	Mutual agreement	18 January 2016	13	(Italy) Stefano Maccoppi	18 January 2016
Dunărea	(Romania) Ionel Ganea	Signed by Voluntari	25 January 2016	1	(Romania) Adrian Mihalcea	4 February 2016
Oțelul Galați	(Romania) Daniel Florea	Resigned	5 February 2016	12	(Romania) Sorin Haraga	26 February 2016
Academica	(Romania) László Balint	Mutual agreement	15 March 2016	4	(Romania) Mugur Bolohan	15 March 2016
Farul	(Romania) Constantin Gache	Resigned	16 March 2016	5	(Romania) Ilie Stan	17 March 2016
Ceahlăul	(Italy) Stefano Maccoppi	Mutual agreement	19 April 2016	6 Play-Out	(Romania) Lidi Chertic	19 April 2016
Farul	(Romania) Ilie Stan	Resigned	25 April 2016	6 Play-Off	(Romania) Ion Barbu	25 April 2016
Berceni	(Romania) Marian Rada	Sacked	26 April 2016	2 Play-Out	(Romania) Răzvan Rotaru	26 April 2016
Rapid Suceava	(Romania) Constantin Ilie	Mutual agreement	26 April 2016	4 Play-Out	(Romania) Daniel Bălan	26 April 2016

=== Stadia by capacity and locations ===
Location of teams in 2015–16 Liga II - Seria II

Club	City	Stadium	Capacity
Baia Mare	Baia Mare	Viorel Mateianu	15,500
Bihor Oradea	Oradea	Iuliu Bodola	11,155
Brașov	Brașov	Silviu Ploeșteanu	8,800
Caransebeș	Caransebeș	Municipal	3,000
Chindia	Târgoviște	Eugen Popescu	10,000
Gaz Metan	Mediaș	Gaz Metan	7,814
Metalul	Reșița	Mircea Chivu	12,500
Mioveni	Mioveni	Orășenesc	7,000
Olimpia	Satu Mare	Olimpia	18,000
Râmnicu Vâlcea	Râmnicu Vâlcea	Municipal	12,000
Șoimii	Pâncota	Șoimii	2,000
Unirea	Tărlungeni	Unirea	1,000
Universitatea	Cluj-Napoca	Cluj Arena	30,201
UTA	Arad	Motorul	2,000

=== Personnel and kits ===
Note: Flags indicate national team as has been defined under FIFA eligibility rules. Players and Managers may hold more than one non-FIFA nationality.

Team	Manager	Captain	Kit manufacturer	Shirt sponsor
Baia Mare	(Romania) Dorin Toma	(Romania) Ciprian Duruș	Gems	Baia Mare
Bihor Oradea	—	—	—	—
Brașov	(Romania) Adrian Szabo	(Romania) Mugurel Buga	Acerbis	Maurer Imobiliare
Caransebeș	—	—	—	—
Chindia Târgoviște	(Romania) Nicolae Croitoru	(Romania) Dragoș Pătru	Joma	Claunic, Azuga Waters
Gaz Metan Mediaș	(Romania) Cristian Pustai	(Romania) Ionuț Buzean	Joma	Romgaz, Transgaz
Metalul Reșița	(Romania) Carol Gurgu	(Cyprus) Nicolas Vitorović	Uhlsport	—
Mioveni	(Romania) Iordan Eftimie	(Romania) Bogdan Stoica	Legea	Mioveni
Olimpia Satu Mare	(Romania) Mircea Bolba	(Romania) Cosmin Iuhas	Joma	Consiliul Judeţean Satu Mare
Râmnicu Vâlcea	(Romania) Adrian Dulcea	(Romania) Ionuț Stoica	Adidas	Damila
Șoimii Pâncota	(Romania) Zsolt Muzsnay	(Senegal) Issa Thiaw	Adidas	Primăria Pâncota, Piroș Security
Unirea Tărlungeni	(Romania) Daniel Bona	(Romania) Liviu Nicolae	Legea	—
Universitatea Cluj	(Romania) Ovidiu Sărmășan	(Romania) Raul Ciupe	Erima	—
UTA Arad	(Romania) Roland Nagy	(Romania) Sorin Botiș	Saller	Gemi Junior, Fornetti

=== Managerial changes ===
Team	Outgoing manager	Manner of departure	Date of vacancy	Position in table	Incoming manager	Date of appointment
Brașov	(Romania) Adrian Szabo	Mutual agreement	31 May 2015	Pre-season	(Romania) Cosmin Bodea	15 June 2015
Metalul	(Romania) Daniel Opriţa	Mutual agreement	30 June 2015	Pre-season	(Romania) Marian Pană	16 July 2015
U Cluj	(Romania) Adrian Falub	Mutual agreement	30 June 2015	Pre-season	(Romania) Marius Popescu	27 July 2015
Caransebeș	(Romania) Alin Artimon	Resigned	13 July 2015	Pre-season	(Italy) Giovanni Pisano	28 July 2015
Brașov	(Romania) Cosmin Bodea	Resigned	8 September 2015	11	(Romania) Adrian Szabo	10 September 2015
Metalul	(Romania) Marian Pană	Resigned	20 September 2015	14	(Romania) Eugen Trică	22 September 2015
Gaz Metan	(Romania) Ion Balaur	Resigned	7 October 2015	3	(Romania) Flavius Șomfălean (caretaker)	7 October 2015
Gaz Metan	(Romania) Flavius Șomfălean (caretaker)	End of tenure as a caretaker	12 October 2015	7	(Romania) Leontin Grozavu	12 October 2015
Mioveni	(Romania) Claudiu Niculescu	Mutual agreement	19 October 2015	9	(Romania) Marius Stoica	19 October 2015
Bihor Oradea	(Romania) Gheorghe Silaghi	Resigned	20 October 2015	11	(Romania) Claudiu Mutu (caretaker)	20 October 2015
Bihor Oradea	(Romania) Claudiu Mutu (caretaker)	End of tenure as a caretaker	27 October 2015	12	(Romania) Dan Mănăilă	27 October 2015
U Cluj	(Romania) Marius Popescu	Sacked	27 October 2015	10	(Romania) Mihai Teja	29 October 2015
Metalul	(Romania) Eugen Trică	Resigned	9 November 2015	14	(Romania) Carol Gurgu	9 November 2015
Caransebeș	(Italy) Giovanni Pisano	Sacked	13 November 2015	12	(Romania) Toma Peica (caretaker)	13 November 2015
Caransebeș	(Romania) Toma Peica (caretaker)	End of tenure as a caretaker	23 November 2015	13	(Romania) Dan Firiţeanu	23 November 2015
Caransebeș	(Romania) Dan Firiţeanu	The club was dissolved	31 December 2015	14	—	—
Brașov	(Romania) Adrian Szabo	Mutual agreement	7 January 2016	5	(Romania) Mihai Stere	8 January 2016
Bihor Oradea	(Romania) Dan Mănăilă	Signed by Mureşul Vinţu	8 January 2016	12	—	—
Brașov	(Romania) Mihai Stere	Resigned	15 March 2016	7	(Romania) Adrian Szabo	15 March 2016
Olimpia	(Romania) Tiberiu Csik	Mutual agreement	15 March 2016	10	(Romania) Mircea Bolba	15 March 2016
Șoimii	(Romania) Ionuţ Popa	Resigned	28 March 2016	9	(Romania) Zsolt Muzsnay	29 March 2016
Râmnicu Vâlcea	(Romania) Alexandru Pelici	Resigned	4 April 2016	7	(Romania) Adrian Dulcea	5 April 2016
Gaz Metan	(Romania) Leontin Grozavu	Signed by Botoșani	5 April 2016	1	(Romania) Cristian Pustai	6 April 2016
U Cluj	(Romania) Mihai Teja	Resigned	9 April 2016	2 Play-Out	(Romania) Zsolt Szilágyi	15 April 2016
Mioveni	(Romania) Marius Stoica	Resigned	17 April 2016	5 Play-Off	(Romania) Iordan Eftimie	18 April 2016
U Cluj	(Romania) Zsolt Szilágyi	Resigned	18 April 2016	3 Play-Out	(Romania) Ovidiu Sărmășan (caretaker)	18 April 2016
Baia Mare	(Romania) Dorin Toma	Resigned	25 April 2016	6 Play-Off	(Romania) Cristian Bogdan (caretaker)	25 April 2016
Baia Mare	(Romania) Cristian Bogdan (caretaker)	End of tenure as a caretaker	28 April 2016	6 Play-Off	(Romania) Dorin Toma	28 April 2016

== League tables ==
=== Seria I ===
Pos	Team	Pld	W	D	L	GF	GA	GD	Pts	Promotion or relegation
1	Rapid București	24	16	6	2	43	10	+33	54	Qualification to promotion play-off
2	Dunărea Călărași	24	15	7	2	50	13	+37	52	Qualification to promotion play-off
3	Dacia Unirea Brăila	24	13	5	6	30	19	+11	44 (Note: FAR 1-1 DUB; DUB 4-0 FAR)	Qualification to promotion play-off
4	Farul Constanța	24	13	5	6	46	30	+16	44	Qualification to promotion play-off
5	Academica Clinceni	24	13	4	7	45	23	+22	43	Qualification to promotion play-off
6	Bacău	24	11	3	10	28	28	0	36	Qualification to promotion play-off
7	Berceni	24	9	7	8	32	35	−3	34	Qualification to relegation play-out
8	Gloria Buzău	24	9	4	11	23	39	−16	31	Qualification to relegation play-out
9	Balotești	24	6	8	10	23	30	−7	26	Qualification to relegation play-out
10	Rapid CFR Suceava	24	6	7	11	22	36	−14	25	Qualification to relegation play-out
11	Bucovina Pojorâta	24	3	8	13	28	50	−22	17	Qualification to relegation play-out
12	Ceahlăul Piatra Neamț	24	3	5	16	14	40	−26	14	Qualification to relegation play-out
13	Oțelul Galați (R)	24	3	3	18	12	43	−31	12	Relegation to Liga III
14	Dorohoi (Note: FCM Dorohoi withdrew from the championship.) (D, R)	0	0	0	0	0	0	0	0	Relegation to Liga III

Source: FRF (in Romanian)
Rules for classification: 1st points; 2nd head-to-head points; 3rd head-to-head goal difference; 4th head-to-head goals scored; 5th head-to-head away goals scored; 6th goal difference; 7th number of goals scored
(D) Disqualified; (R) Relegated

=== Seria II ===
Pos	Team	Pld	W	D	L	GF	GA	GD	Pts	Promotion or relegation
1	Gaz Metan Mediaș	26	16	5	5	37	18	+19	53	Qualification to promotion play-off
2	Chindia Târgoviște	26	16	4	6	48	18	+30	52	Qualification to promotion play-off
3	UTA Arad	26	15	6	5	48	28	+20	51	Qualification to promotion play-off
4	Baia Mare	26	13	7	6	33	15	+18	46	Qualification to promotion play-off
5	Brașov	26	12	9	5	48	24	+24	45 (Note: BRA 0-0 MIO; MIO 0-1 BRA)	Qualification to promotion play-off
6	Mioveni	26	13	6	7	40	18	+22	45	Qualification to promotion play-off
7	Râmnicu Vâlcea	26	12	8	6	39	23	+16	44 (Note: RMV 2-1 UCJ; UCJ 1-1 RMV)	Qualification to relegation play-out
8	Universitatea Cluj	26	13	5	8	30	15	+15	44	Qualification to relegation play-out
9	Șoimii Pâncota	26	9	8	9	30	29	+1	35	Qualification to relegation play-out
10	Olimpia Satu Mare	26	9	6	11	35	36	−1	33	Qualification to relegation play-out
11	Unirea Tărlungeni	26	5	9	12	26	34	−8	24	Qualification to relegation play-out
12	Bihor Oradea (Note: Bihor Oradea was dissolved and lost all the matches from the second part of the season with 0-3.) (D, R)	25	4	1	20	10	58	−48	13	Relegation to Liga III
13	Metalul Reșița (Note: Metalul Reșița were deducted 15 points.)	26	3	1	22	18	74	−56	−5	Qualification to relegation play-out
14	Caransebeș (Note: Caransebeș were deducted 96 points. Then later were excluded from the championship and lost all the matches from the second part of the season with 0-3.) (D, R)	25	3	1	21	11	63	−52	−86	Relegation to Liga III

Source: FRF (in Romanian)
Rules for classification: 1st points; 2nd head-to-head points; 3rd head-to-head goal difference; 4th head-to-head goals scored; 5th head-to-head away goals scored; 6th goal difference; 7th number of goals scored
(D) Disqualified; (R) Relegated

== Promotion play-offs ==
At the end of the regular season, the first six teams from each series will play a Promotion play-off. The winners will be promoted to Liga I and the second place from both series will play a Play-Off match. The winner will play against 12th place in Liga I, and the winner of this second match will play in Liga I. The teams will start the play-off with half of the number of points gained in the regular season, after the results with the last two teams are canceled.

=== Seria I ===
Pos	Team	Pld	W	D	L	GF	GA	GD	Pts	Promotion
1	Rapid București (C, D)	10	6	1	3	12	11	+1	44	Not admitted to Liga I
2	Dunărea Călărași	10	5	3	2	22	8	+14	41	Qualification to promotion play-off
3	Dacia Unirea Brăila	10	4	2	4	16	13	+3	35	
4	Bacău	10	4	3	3	16	16	0	30	
5	Farul Constanța	10	3	1	6	17	23	−6	29	
6	Academica Clinceni	10	2	2	6	15	27	−12	27	

Source: FRF (in Romanian)
Rules for classification: 1st points; 2nd head-to-head points; 3rd head-to-head goal difference; 4th head-to-head goals scored; 5th head-to-head away goals scored; 6th goal difference; 7th number of goals scored
(C) Champions; (D) Disqualified

=== Seria II ===
Pos	Team	Pld	W	D	L	GF	GA	GD	Pts	Promotion
1	Gaz Metan Mediaș (C, P)	10	6	2	2	17	9	+8	41 (Note: GAZ 4-0 UTA; UTA 1-1 GAZ)	Promotion to Liga I
2	UTA Arad	10	6	3	1	18	14	+4	41	Qualification to promotion play-off
3	Chindia Târgoviște	10	6	2	2	18	12	+6	40	
4	Mioveni	10	2	4	4	15	17	−2	27	
5	Brașov	10	1	1	8	14	26	−12	23	
6	Baia Mare (Note: Baia Mare were deducted 12 points.)	10	2	2	6	16	20	−4	13	

Source: FRF (in Romanian)
Rules for classification: 1st points; 2nd head-to-head points; 3rd head-to-head goal difference; 4th head-to-head goals scored; 5th head-to-head away goals scored; 6th goal difference; 7th number of goals scored
(C) Champions; (P) Promoted

== Relegation play-outs ==
At the end of the regular season, the teams that are on 13th and 14th places will be relegated to Liga III. The teams from 7th place to 12th place will play a relegation play-out. At the end of the play-out, the last 3 teams in both series relegate directly, while the team that finishes on 3rd place from Seria I will play a Play-Out match with the 3rd place from Seria II, the loser of which will also relegate to Liga III. The teams will start the play-out with half of the number of points gained in the regular season, after the results with the last two teams are canceled.

=== Seria I ===
Pos	Team	Pld	W	D	L	GF	GA	GD	Pts	Qualification or relegation
1	Balotești	10	6	3	1	20	8	+12	32	
2	Berceni	10	5	1	4	21	12	+9	30	
3	Gloria Buzău (R)	10	5	1	4	17	20	−3	29	Qualification to relegation play-out
4	Rapid CFR Suceava (R)	10	5	2	3	21	16	+5	28	Relegation to Liga III
5	Bucovina Pojorâta (R)	10	5	1	4	23	16	+7	23	Relegation to Liga III
6	Ceahlăul Piatra Neamț (Note: Ceahlăul was excluded from the championship and lost all the matches from the relegation play-out with 0-3.) (D, R)	10	0	0	10	0	30	−30	−100	Relegation to Liga III

Source: FRF (in Romanian)
Rules for classification: 1st points; 2nd head-to-head points; 3rd head-to-head goal difference; 4th head-to-head goals scored; 5th head-to-head away goals scored; 6th goal difference; 7th number of goals scored
(D) Disqualified; (R) Relegated

=== Seria II ===
Pos	Team	Pld	W	D	L	GF	GA	GD	Pts	Qualification or relegation
1	Râmnicu Vâlcea	10	5	2	3	15	9	+6	35	
2	Șoimii Pâncota	10	6	1	3	12	12	0	32 (Note: Șoimii Pâncota had an even number of points, when the points were divided and Olimpia Satu Mare had an odd number, Olimpia points were rounded, receiving an extra 0,5 points, so Șoimii Pâncota avoid relegation because they have 0,5 points more than Olimpia, without rounding.)	
3	Olimpia Satu Mare (O)	10	6	3	1	17	9	+8	32	Qualification to relegation play-out
4	Universitatea Cluj (R)	10	3	3	4	11	13	−2	28	Relegation to Liga III
5	Unirea Tărlungeni (R)	10	4	2	4	20	12	+8	23	Relegation to Liga III
6	Metalul Reșița (Note: Metalul Reșița were deducted 15 points.) (R)	10	0	1	9	3	23	−20	−10	Relegation to Liga III

Source: FRF (in Romanian)
Rules for classification: 1st points; 2nd head-to-head points; 3rd head-to-head goal difference; 4th head-to-head goals scored; 5th head-to-head away goals scored; 6th goal difference; 7th number of goals scored
(O) Play-off winners; (R) Relegated

== Liga I play-offs ==
The 12th-placed team of the Liga I faced the winner of the match between the 2nd-placed teams of Seria I and Seria II.

=== First round ===
Team 1	Agg.	Team 2	1st leg	2nd leg
Dunărea Călărași	4–5 (a.e.t.)	UTA Arad	3–1	1–4 (a.e.t.)

1 June 2016	Dunărea Călărași	3–1	UTA Arad	Călărași
18:00	Alexandru 4', 45'; Kanda 80'		Strătilă 43'	Stadium: Ion Comșa; Attendance: 6,500; Referee: Marius Avram (Bucharest)

4 June 2016	UTA Arad	4–1 (a.e.t.)	Dunărea Călărași	Arad
18:00	Man 17'; Curtuiuș 34'; Rus 75', 99'		Balint 80'	Stadium: Motorul; Attendance: 2,000; Referee: Sebastian Colțescu (Craiova)

=== Second round ===
Team 1	Agg.	Team 2	1st leg	2nd leg
Voluntari	3–1	UTA Arad	3–0	0–1

8 June 2016	Voluntari	3–0	UTA Arad	Voluntari
18:30	Voduț 27'; Tudorie 44'; Bălan 79'			Stadium: Anghel Iordănescu; Attendance: 3,000; Referee: István Kovács (Carei)

12 June 2016	UTA Arad	1–0	Voluntari	Arad
13:00	Rus 88'			Stadium: Motorul; Attendance: 2,000; Referee: Cristian Balaj (Baia Mare)

Notes:

- Voluntari qualified for 2016–17 Liga I and UTA Arad qualified for 2016–17 Liga II.

== Liga II play-out ==
The 9th-placed team of the Seria I faced 9th-placed team of Seria II.

Team 1	Agg.	Team 2	1st leg	2nd leg
Gloria Buzău	0–6 (forfait)	Olimpia Satu Mare	0–3 (forfait)	0–3 (forfait)

7 June 2016	Olimpia Satu Mare	3–0 (forfait)	Gloria Buzău	Satu Mare
18:00				Stadium: Olimpia

11 June 2016	Gloria Buzău	0–3 (forfait)	Olimpia Satu Mare	Buzău
18:00				Stadium: Municipal

Notes:

- Gloria Buzău withdrew from the relegation play-out and the matches were homologated with 0–3. Gloria Buzău relegated to Liga III.
