= List of FC Brașov (1936) managers =

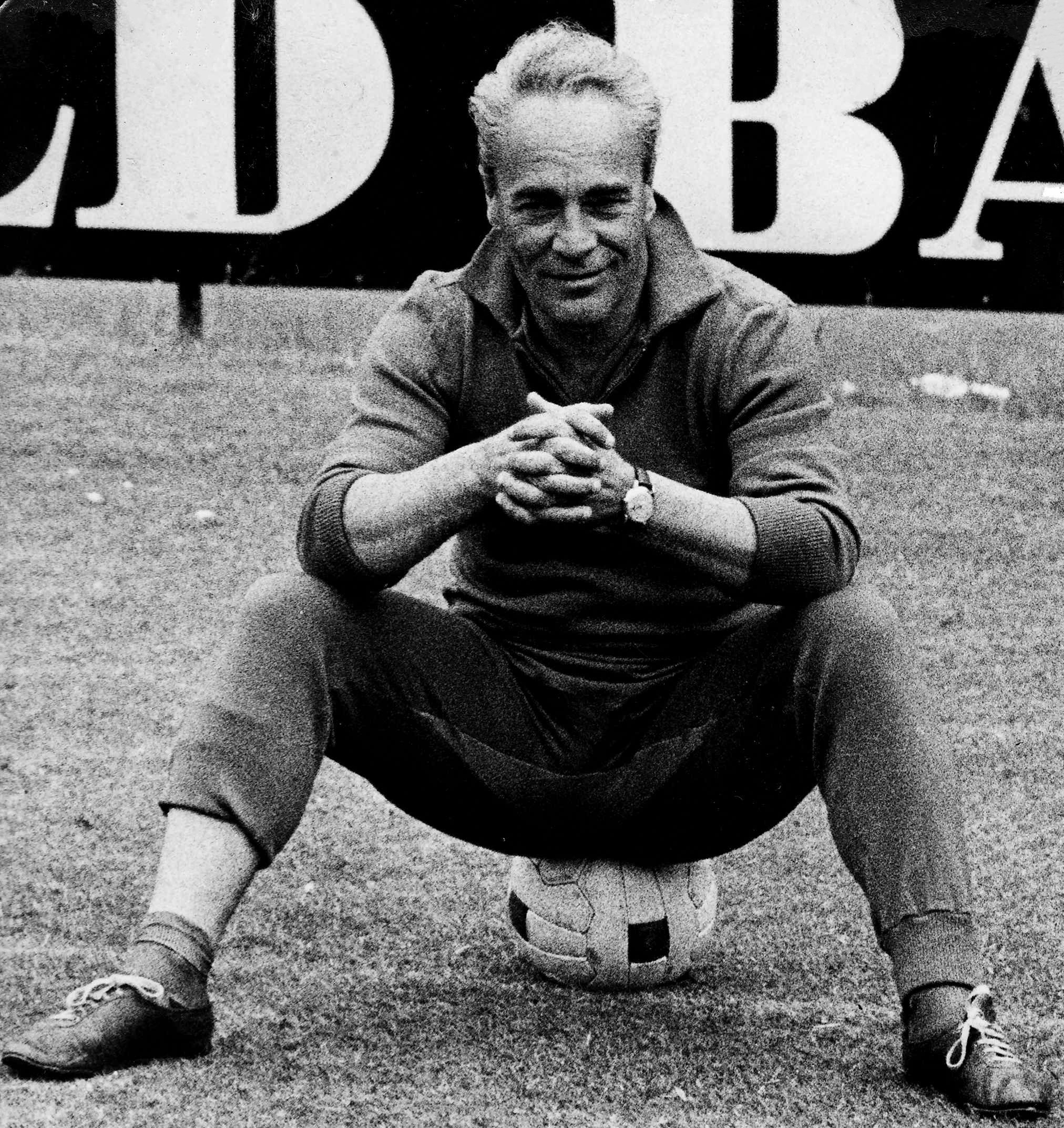
Silviu Ploeşteanu in 1963

This is a list of managers who have been in charge at FC Brașov.

== Silviu Ploeşteanu ==
Silviu Ploeşteanu is the man of records at FC Braşov. In a top of the longest serving football managers at the same club in consecutive years, Mr Silviu Ploeşteanu is fourth with 20 years in charge at Steagul Roşu Braşov (the former name of FC Braşov). Today the club's stadium holds his name. As of 2013, the top six were:

1. Guy Roux, 44 years at AJ Auxerre (1961–2005)

2. Sir Alex Ferguson, 27 years at Manchester United (1986–2013)

3. Sir Matt Busby, 24 years at Manchester United (1945–1969)

4. Silviu Ploeşteanu, 20 years at Steagul Roşu Braşov (1948–1968)

5. Valeri Lobanovsky, 16 years at Dinamo Kiev (1974–1990)

6. Bill Shankly, 15 years at Liverpool F.C. (1959–1974) and Eugène Gerards, 15 years at OFI (1985–2000)

== Managerial history ==
The list of the FC Brașov managers, as remembered by the statistics:

Season	League	Manager	Period	Rounds	Position
1948–49	Divizia C	(Romania) Silviu Ploeşteanu			
1950	Divizia C	(Romania) Silviu Ploeşteanu			
1951	Divizia B	(Romania) Silviu Ploeşteanu			4th
1952	Divizia B	(Romania) Silviu Ploeşteanu			6th
1953	Divizia B	(Romania) Silviu Ploeşteanu			6th
1954	Divizia B	(Romania) Silviu Ploeşteanu			4th
1955	Divizia B	(Romania) Silviu Ploeşteanu			9th
1956	Divizia B	(Romania) Silviu Ploeşteanu			1st (P)
1957–58	Divizia A	(Romania) Silviu Ploeşteanu			7th
1958–59	Divizia A	(Romania) Silviu Ploeşteanu			7th
1959–60	Divizia A	(Romania) Silviu Ploeşteanu			2nd
1960–61	Divizia A	(Romania) Silviu Ploeşteanu			5th
1961–62	Divizia A	(Romania) Silviu Ploeşteanu			4th
1962–63	Divizia A	(Romania) Silviu Ploeşteanu			6th
1963–64	Divizia A	(Romania) Silviu Ploeşteanu			6th
1964–65	Divizia A	(Romania) Silviu Ploeşteanu			4th
1965–66	Divizia A	(Romania) Silviu Ploeşteanu			5th
1966–67	Divizia A	(Romania) Silviu Ploeşteanu			7th
1967–68	Divizia A	(Romania) Silviu Ploeşteanu			14th (R)
1968–69	Divizia B	(Romania) Nicolae Proca		All rounds	1st (P)
1969–70	Divizia A	(Romania) Valentin Stănescu		All rounds	8th
1970–71	Divizia A	(Romania) Valentin Stănescu		All rounds	5th
1971–72	Divizia A	(Romania) Nicolae Proca		All rounds	5th
1972–73	Divizia A	(Romania) Nicolae Proca		All rounds	7th
1973–74	Divizia A	(Romania) Nicolae Proca		All rounds	3rd (Q^{1})
1974–75	Divizia A	(Romania) Nicolae Proca		Round 1 to round 22	16th (R)
1974–75	Divizia A	(Romania) Alexandru Meszaros		Round 23 to round 34	16th (R)
1975–76	Divizia B				3rd
1976–77	Divizia B				2nd
1977–78	Divizia B				5th
1978–78	Divizia B				2nd
1979–80	Divizia B				1st (P)
1980–81	Divizia A				8th
1981–82	Divizia A	(Romania) Nicolae Pescaru		All rounds	13th
1982–83	Divizia A	(Romania) Nicolae Pescaru		Round 1 to round 7	16th (R)
1982–83	Divizia A	(Romania) Ştefan Coidum		Round 8 to round 34	16th (R)
1983–84	Divizia B	(Romania) Ştefan Coidum		All rounds	1st (P)
1984–85	Divizia A	(Romania) Ştefan Coidum		Round 1 to round 18	12th
1984–85	Divizia A	(Romania) Marcel Goran		Round 23 to round 34	12th
1985–86	Divizia A	(Romania) Marcel Goran		Round 1 to round 18	11th
1985–86	Divizia A	(Romania) Costică Ştefănescu		Round 19 to round 34	11th
1986–87	Divizia A	(Romania) Costică Ştefănescu		All rounds	13th
1987–88	Divizia A	(Romania) Costică Ştefănescu		All rounds	8th
1988–89	Divizia A	(Romania) Costică Ştefănescu		All rounds	10th
1989–90	Divizia A	(Romania) Costică Ştefănescu		Round 1 to round 7	7th
1989–90	Divizia A	(Romania) Dumitru Anescu		Round 8 to round 34	7th
1990–91	Divizia A	(Romania) Ioan Nagy		All rounds	9th
1991–92	Divizia A	(Romania) Csaba Györffy		Round 9 to round 13	9th
1991–92	Divizia A	(Romania) Paul Enache		Round 14 to round 34	9th
1992–93	Divizia A	(Romania) Paul Enache		Round 1 to round 27	12th
1992–93	Divizia A	(Romania) Gheorghe Staicu		All rounds	12th
1993–94	Divizia A	(Romania) Nicolae Pescaru		Round 1 to round 29	13th
1993–94	Divizia A	(Romania) Dorel Purdea		Round 30 to round 34	13th
1994–95	Divizia A	(Romania) Ioan Nagy		Round 1 to round 17	14th
1994–95	Divizia A	(Romania) Gabriel Stan		Round 18 to round 34	14th
1995–96	Divizia A	(Romania) Gabriel Stan		Round 1 to round 18	10th
1995–96	Divizia A	(Romania) Csaba Györffy		Round 19 to round 21	10th
1995–96	Divizia A	(Romania) Viorel Hizo		Round 22 to round 34	10th
1996–97	Divizia A	(Romania) Viorel Hizo		Round 1 to round 20	18th (R)
1996–97	Divizia A	(Romania) Marian Mihail		Round 21 to round 34	18th (R)
1997–98	Divizia B	(Romania) Costel Orac		Round 1 to round 17	3rd
1997–98	Divizia B	(Romania) Marin Barbu		Rest of the season	3rd
1998–99	Divizia B	(Romania) Cornel Ţălnar		All rounds	1st (P)
1999–00	Divizia A	(Romania) Ioan Andone		Round 1 to round 18	14th
1999–00	Divizia A	(Romania) Adrian Hârlab		Round 19 to round 20	14th
1999–00	Divizia A	(Romania) Florin Halagian		Round 21 to day 31	14th
1999–00	Divizia A	(Romania) Adrian Hârlab		Round 32 to round 34	14th
2000–01	Divizia A	(Romania) Gabriel Stan		All rounds	3rd (Q^{2})
2001–02	Divizia A	(Romania) Ilie Dumitrescu		Round 1 to round 3	11th
2001–02	Divizia A	(Romania) Adrian Hârlab		Round 4 to round 8	11th
2001–02	Divizia A	(Romania) Gabriel Stan		Round 9 to round 23	11th
2001–02	Divizia A	(Romania) Ferencz Bajko		Round 24 to round 30	11th
2002–03	Divizia A	(Romania) Marius Lăcătuş		All rounds	4th
2003–04	Divizia A	(Romania) Marius Lăcătuş		Round 1 to round 15	11th
2003–04	Divizia A	(Romania) Răzvan Lucescu		Round 16 to round 30	11th
2004–05	Divizia A	(Romania) Ionuţ Lupescu		Round 1 to round 5	15th (R)
2004–05	Divizia A	(Romania) Gabriel Stan		Round 6 to round 20	15th (R)
2004–05	Divizia A	(Romania) Ferencz Bajko		Round 21 to round 30	15th (R)
2005–06	Divizia B	(Romania) Gheorghe Mulţescu		Round 1 to round 6	3rd
2005–06	Divizia B	(Romania) Nicolae Manea		Round 7 to round 12	3rd
2005–06	Divizia B	(Romania) Gheorghe Mulţescu		Round 13 to round 15	3rd
2005–06	Divizia B	(Romania) Cornel Ţălnar		Round 16 to round 30	3rd
2006–07	Liga II	(Romania) Aurel Şunda		Round 1 to round 10	10th
2006–07	Liga II	(Romania) Gabriel Stan		Round 11 to round 17	10th
2006–07	Liga II	(Romania) Mihai Stoica		Round 18 to round 34	10th
2007–08	Liga II	(Romania) Răzvan Lucescu	July 1, 2007 – June 5, 2009	All rounds	1st (P)
2008–09	Liga I	(Romania) Răzvan Lucescu	July 1, 2007 – June 5, 2009	All rounds	9th
2009–10	Liga I	(Italy) Nicolò Napoli	July 5, 2009 – July 27, 2009	Pre-season only	9th
2009–10	Liga I	(Romania) Viorel Moldovan	July 27, 2009 – June 11, 2010	All rounds	9th
2010–11	Liga I	(Italy) Giuseppe Materazzi	June 27, 2010 – July 1, 2010	Pre-season only	12th
2010–11	Liga I	(Romania) Daniel Isăilă	July 9, 2010 – Dec 18, 2010	Round 1 to round 18	12th
2010–11	Liga I	(Portugal) António Conceição	Dec 18, 2010 – July 14, 2011	Rest of the season	12th
2011–12	Liga I	(Romania) Daniel Isăilă		Round 1 to round 2	10th
2011–12	Liga I	(Spain) José Murcia	Aug 9, 2011 – Aug 30, 2011	Round 3 to round 5	10th
2011–12	Liga I	(Romania) Daniel Isăilă	Aug 30, 2011 – Nov 1, 2011	Round 6 to round 14	10th
2011–12	Liga I	(Romania) Marius Şumudică	Nov 2, 2011 – April 16, 2012	Round 15 to round 27	10th
2011–12	Liga I	(Romania) Ionuţ Badea	April 17, 2012 – Sept 17, 2012	Round 28 to round 34	10th
2012–13	Liga I	(Romania) Ionuţ Badea	April 17, 2012 – Sept 17, 2012	Round 1 to round 8	7th
2012–13	Liga I	(Romania) Viorel Hizo		No rounds	7th
2012–13	Liga I	(Romania) Adrian Szabo (interim)	Sept 18, 2012 – Oct 10, 2012	Round 9 to round 11	7th
2012–13	Liga I	(Romania) Sorin Cârţu	Oct 10, 2012 – Nov 12, 2012	Round 12 to round 15	7th
2012–13	Liga I	(Romania) Adrian Szabo	Nov 12, 2012 – Aug 19, 2013	Round 16 to round 34	7th
2013–14	Liga I	(Romania) Adrian Szabo	Nov 12, 2012 – Aug 19, 2013	Round 1 to round 5	15th
2013–14	Liga I	(Romania) Aurel Ţicleanu	Aug 19, 2013 – Sept 22, 2013	Round 6 to round 8	15th
2013–14	Liga I	(Romania) Alexandru Pelici	Sept 23, 2013 – Nov 4, 2013	Round 9 to round 13	15th
2013–14	Liga I	(Romania) Ilie Stan	Nov 6, 2013 – Jan 15, 2014	Round 14 to round 19	15th
2013–14	Liga I	(Romania) Cornel Țălnar	Jan 27, 2014 – Aug 14, 2014	Round 20 to round 34	15th
2014–15	Liga I	(Romania) Cornel Țălnar	Jan 27, 2014 – Aug 14, 2014	Round 1 to round 3	14th (R)
2014–15	Liga I	(Romania) Adrian Szabo	Aug 14, 2014 – Jan 5, 2015	Round 1 to round 17	14th (R)
2014–15	Liga I	(Croatia) Vjekoslav Lokica	Jan 5, 2015 – Apr 12, 2015	Round 17 to round 27	14th (R)
2014–15	Liga I	(Romania) Adrian Szabo	Apr 12, 2015 – 31 May, 2016	Round 27 to round 34	14th (R)
2015–16	Liga II	(Romania) Cosmin Bodea	Jun 15, 2015 – Sep 8, 2015	Round 1 to round 2	
2015–16	Liga II	(Romania) Adrian Szabo	Sep 10, 2015 – Jan 7, 2016	Round 3 to Round 32	

(Q^{1}) = Qualified for the 1974–75 UEFA Cup First round
(Q^{2}) = Qualified for the 2001–02 UEFA Cup Qualifying round
(R) = Relegated; (P) = Promoted
