= 2014–15 Liga I =

97th season of top-tier football league in Romania

Liga I
- Season: 2014–15
- Champions: Steaua București; 26th title
- Relegated: Gaz Metan Mediaș; Brașov; Universitatea Cluj; Rapid București; Oțelul Galați; Ceahlăul Piatra Neamț
- Champions League: Steaua București
- Europa League: Târgu Mureș; Astra Giurgiu; Botoșani
- Matches: 306
- Goals: 700 (2.29 per match)
- Top goalscorer: Grégory Tadé (18)
- Best goalkeeper: Peterson Peçanha (16 clean sheets)
- Biggest home win: Steaua 6–0 Pandurii (15 August 2014)
- Biggest away win: Ceahlăul 0–6 Universitatea (6 December 2014)
- Highest scoring: Botoșani 4–4 Viitorul (29 May 2015)
- Longest winning run: CFR Cluj (6)
- Longest unbeaten run: Universitatea Craiova (19)
- Longest winless run: Ceahlăul Piatra Neamț (16)
- Longest losing run: Oțelul Galați, Brașov (5)
- Highest attendance: 38,154; Steaua 3–0 Dinamo (31 October 2014)
- Lowest attendance: 0 (close doors)
- Total attendance: 1,123,632
- Average attendance: 3,672
- All statistics correct as of 30 May 2015.

The 2014–15 Liga I was the ninety-seventh season of Liga I, the top-level football league of Romania. The season began on the 25 July 2014 and ended on 30 May 2015. Steaua București successfully defended their title for a record 26th win.

== Teams ==
The last three teams and the 5th position from the 2013–14 season were initially relegated to their respective 2014–15 Liga II division. Săgeata Năvodari, Poli Timișoara, Corona Brașov were relegated and the 5th-placed Vaslui was relegated due to financial problems after 9 seasons in the top flight.

The first two teams from each of the two divisions of 2013–14 Liga II advanced to Liga I. CSMS Iași promoted as the winners of Seria I. It is their second season in Liga I. Rapid București, second place in Seria I, made an immediate return to Liga I. Universitatea Craiova is for the first time in Liga I from Seria II, together with Târgu Mureș, who returned after a 2 year absence.

Rapid București was initially not given licence for the 2014–15 Liga I, but on 30 June 2014, the International Court of Arbitration for Sport upheld the appeal of Rapid București and therefore decided that they could promote in Liga I.

=== Venues ===
Universitatea Cluj	Steaua București (Note: Steaua was relocated to Arena Națională in the second half of the season, as a result of the conflict with CSA Steaua București, owner of the stadium.)	Universitatea Craiova (Note: Universitatea Craiova was relocated to Extensiv Stadium in the second half of the season, as a result of the demolition of the old Ion Oblemenco Stadium, that is planned to be replaced by a modern arena, new Ion Oblemenco Stadium.)	CFR Cluj
Cluj Arena	Steaua	Ion Oblemenco	Dr. Constantin Rădulescu
Capacity: 30,201	Capacity: 28,365	Capacity: 25,252	Capacity: 23,500
Ceahlăul Piatra Neamț	Petrolul Ploiești	Dinamo București	Oțelul Galați
Ceahlăul	Ilie Oană	Dinamo	Oțelul
Capacity: 18,000	Capacity: 15,073	Capacity: 15,032	Capacity: 13,500
Rapid București	2014–15 Liga I (Romania) Location of Bucharest teams.		CSMS Iași
Giulești-Valentin Stănescu	2014–15 Liga I (Romania) Location of Bucharest teams.		Emil Alexandrescu
Capacity: 11,704 (Note: Capacity of Giulești-Valentin Stănescu Stadium has been reduced from 19,100 to 11,704 due to advanced degradation of the resistance structure of the South End.)	2014–15 Liga I (Romania) Location of Bucharest teams.		Capacity: 11,390
Pandurii Târgu Jiu	2014–15 Liga I (Romania) Location of Bucharest teams.		FC Brașov
Tudor Vladimirescu	2014–15 Liga I (Romania) Location of Bucharest teams.		Silviu Ploeșteanu
Capacity: 9,200	2014–15 Liga I (Romania) Location of Bucharest teams.		Capacity: 8,800
Astra Giurgiu	2014–15 Liga I (Romania) Location of Bucharest teams.		Târgu Mureș
Marin Anastasovici	2014–15 Liga I (Romania) Location of Bucharest teams.		Trans-Sil
Capacity: 8,500	2014–15 Liga I (Romania) Location of Bucharest teams.		Capacity: 8,200
Gaz Metan Mediaș	FC Botoșani	Concordia Chiajna	Viitorul Constanța (Note: Viitorul was relocated to Concordia Stadium from Chiajna for this season, because Orășenesc Stadium from Ovidiu didn't meet the licensing rules.)
Gaz Metan	Municipal	Concordia	Concordia
Capacity: 7,814	Capacity: 7,782	Capacity: 5,123	Capacity: 5,123

=== Personnel and kits ===
Note: Flags indicate national team as has been defined under FIFA eligibility rules. Players and Managers may hold more than one non-FIFA nationality.

Team	Manager	Captain	Kit manufacturer	Shirt sponsor
Târgu Mureș	(Romania) Liviu Ciobotariu	(Romania) Gabriel Mureșan	Joma	energo+
Astra Giurgiu	(Romania) Marius Șumudică	(Romania) Constantin Budescu	Puma	InterAgro
Brașov	(Romania) Adrian Szabo	(Romania) Mugurel Buga	Puma	Roman
Botoșani	(Romania) Leontin Grozavu	(Romania) Ciprian Dinu	Nike	Elsaco
Ceahlăul Piatra Neamț	(Serbia) Vanja Radinović	(Romania) Vlad Achim	Masita	Getica 95
CFR Cluj	(Romania) Francisc Dican	(Romania) Ciprian Deac	Joma	EnergoBit
Concordia Chiajna	(Romania) Marius Baciu	(Romania) Vasile Maftei	Masita	—
CSMS Iași	(Italy) Nicolò Napoli	(Romania) Adrian Olah	Nike	Primăria Municipiului Iași
Universitatea Craiova	(Romania) Emil Săndoi	(Argentina) Pablo Brandán	Joma	KDF Energy
Dinamo București	(Romania) Mircea Rednic	(Romania) Marius Niculae	Nike	Orange
Gaz Metan Mediaș	(Romania) Ion Balaur	(Romania) Cristian Todea	Joma	RomGaz
Oțelul Galați	(Romania) Florin Marin	(Romania) Florin Cernat	Cawila	—
Pandurii Târgu Jiu	(Romania) Eduard Iordănescu	(Romania) Dan Nistor	Erreà	Complexul Energetic Oltenia
Petrolul Ploiești	(Romania) Valentin Sinescu	(Brazil) Peterson Pecanha	Nike	Disteriile Alexandrion
Rapid București	(Italy) Cristiano Bergodi	(Romania) Cristian Săpunaru	Puma	Azuga
Steaua București	(Romania) Constantin Gâlcă	(Romania) Cristian Tănase	Nike	City Insurance
Universitatea Cluj	(Romania) Adrian Falub	(Romania) Raul Costin	Erima	Romprest Service
Viitorul	(Romania) Gheorghe Hagi	(Romania) Bogdan Mitrea	Nike	Next 11 by Pepsi

=== Managerial changes ===
Team	Outgoing manager	Manner of departure	Date of vacancy	Position in table	Incoming manager	Date of appointment
Steaua București	(Romania) Laurențiu Reghecampf	Mutual termination	25 May 2014	Pre-season	(Romania) Constantin Gâlcă	2 June 2014
Universitatea Craiova	(Romania) Gavril Balint	Mutual termination	10 June 2014	Pre-season	(Romania) Ionel Gane	10 June 2014
Oțelul Galați	(Germany) Ewald Lienen	Resigned	1 June 2014	Pre-season	(Germany) Michael Weiß	27 June 2014
Viitorul	(Romania) Bogdan Vintilă	End of contract	1 June 2014	Pre-season	(Romania) Bogdan Stelea	30 June 2014
Rapid București	(Romania) Viorel Moldovan	Signed by Romania U-21	3 July 2014	Pre-season	(Romania) Ionel Ganea	24 July 2014
Ceahlăul Piatra Neamț	(Romania) Marin Barbu	Resigned	2 August 2014	18	(Romania) Florin Marin	2 August 2014
Brașov	(Romania) Cornel Țălnar	Resigned	15 August 2014	18	(Romania) Adrian Szabo	15 August 2014
Viitorul	(Romania) Bogdan Stelea	Resigned	19 August 2014	14	(Romania) Bogdan Vintilă	21 August 2014
CSMS Iași	(Romania) Marius Lăcătuș	Mutual agreement	29 August 2014	16	(Romania) Ionuț Chirilă	29 August 2014
Universitatea Craiova	(Romania) Ionel Gane	Sacked	2 September 2014	18	(Romania) Emil Săndoi	3 September 2014
Universitatea Cluj	(Romania) Mihai Teja	Resigned	4 September 2014	9	(Romania) George Ogăraru	5 September 2014
Petrolul Ploiești	(Romania) Răzvan Lucescu	Sacked	16 September 2014	4	(Romania) Gheorghe Mulțescu	17 September 2014
Oțelul Galați	(Germany) Michael Weiß	Sacked	16 September 2014	15	(Romania) Daniel Florea (caretaker)	16 September 2014
Oțelul Galați	(Romania) Daniel Florea (caretaker)	End of tenure as a caretaker	22 September 2014	15	(Romania) Tibor Selymes	22 September 2014
Târgu Mureș	(Romania) Adrian Falub	Sacked	29 September 2014	6	(Romania) Cristian Pustai	30 September 2014
Rapid București	(Romania) Ionel Ganea	Sacked	29 September 2014	14	(Romania) Marian Rada	30 September 2014
CSMS Iași	(Romania) Ionuț Chirilă	Sacked	9 October 2014	18	(Italy) Nicolò Napoli	13 October 2014
Astra Giurgiu	(Romania) Daniel Isăilă	Sacked	10 October 2014	4	(Ukraine) Oleh Protasov	10 October 2014
Viitorul	(Romania) Bogdan Vintilă	Resigned	13 October 2014	14	(Romania) Gheorghe Hagi	13 October 2014
Dinamo București	(Romania) Flavius Stoican	Mutual agreement	12 November 2014	6	(Romania) Ionel Dănciulescu (caretaker)	13 November 2014
CFR Cluj	(Romania) Vasile Miriuță	Resigned	23 November 2014	2	(Romania) Francisc Dican (caretaker)	24 November 2014
Gaz Metan Mediaș	(Romania) Cristian Dulca	Resigned	30 November 2014	14	(Romania) Dănuț Matei	30 November 2014
Pandurii Târgu Jiu	(Romania) Petre Grigoraș	Mutual agreement	7 December 2014	12	(Romania) Dorian Gugu (caretaker)	8 December 2014
Pandurii Târgu Jiu	(Romania) Dorian Gugu (caretaker)	End of tenure as a caretaker	16 December 2014	12	(Romania) Eduard Iordănescu	16 December 2014
Târgu Mureș	(Romania) Cristian Pustai	Sacked	29 December 2014	4	(Romania) Liviu Ciobotariu	2 January 2015
CFR Cluj	(Romania) Francisc Dican (caretaker)	End of tenure as a caretaker	6 January 2015	2	(Romania) Eugen Trică	6 January 2015
Dinamo București	(Romania) Ionel Dănciulescu (caretaker)	End of tenure as a caretaker	7 January 2015	8	(Romania) Mihai Teja	7 January 2015
Brașov	(Romania) Adrian Szabo	Mutual agreement	8 January 2015	10	(Croatia) Vjekoslav Lokica	8 January 2015
Petrolul Ploiești	(Romania) Gheorghe Mulțescu	Mutual agreement	8 January 2015	3	(Romania) Mircea Rednic	10 January 2015
Rapid București	(Romania) Marian Rada	Mutual agreement	8 January 2015	18	(Romania) Cristian Pustai	8 January 2015
Ceahlăul Piatra Neamț	(Romania) Florin Marin	Sacked	11 January 2015	15	(Brazil) Zé Maria	12 January 2015
Oțelul Galați	(Romania) Tibor Selymes	Resigned	2 March 2015	17	(Romania) Florin Marin	2 March 2015
Universitatea Cluj	(Romania) George Ogăraru	Mutual agreement	2 March 2015	13	(Romania) Adrian Falub	2 March 2015
Astra Giurgiu	(Ukraine) Oleh Protasov	Sacked	2 March 2015	5	(Romania) Dorinel Munteanu	4 March 2015
Dinamo București	(Romania) Mihai Teja	Sacked	12 March 2015	6	(Romania) Flavius Stoican	12 March 2015
CFR Cluj	(Romania) Eugen Trică	Resigned	2 April 2015	18	(Romania) Francisc Dican (caretaker)	3 April 2015
Concordia Chiajna	(Romania) Marius Șumudică	Sacked	5 April 2015	11	(Romania) Marius Baciu	6 April 2015
Brașov	(Croatia) Vjekoslav Lokica	Resigned	12 April 2015	12	(Romania) Adrian Szabo	13 April 2015
Rapid București	(Romania) Cristian Pustai	Sacked	14 April 2015	16	(Italy) Cristiano Bergodi	15 April 2015
Gaz Metan Mediaș	(Romania) Dănuț Matei	Resigned	16 April 2015	14	(Romania) Ion Balaur (caretaker)	16 April 2015
Ceahlăul Piatra Neamț	(Brazil) Zé Maria	Sacked	20 April 2015	15	(Serbia) Vanja Radinović	20 April 2015
Astra Giurgiu	(Romania) Dorinel Munteanu	Resigned	28 April 2015	5	(Romania) Marius Șumudică	28 April 2015
Petrolul Ploiești	(Romania) Mircea Rednic	Mutual agreement	5 May 2015	3	(Romania) Valentin Sinescu (caretaker)	5 May 2015
Dinamo București	(Romania) Flavius Stoican	Mutual agreement	6 May 2015	8	(Romania) Mircea Rednic	6 May 2015

== League table ==
Pos	Team	Pld	W	D	L	GF	GA	GD	Pts	Qualification or relegation
1	Steaua București (C)	34	22	5	7	59	23	+36	71	Qualification for the Champions League second qualifying round
2	Târgu Mureș	34	20	8	6	51	25	+26	68	Qualification for the Europa League third qualifying round
3	CFR Cluj (Note: CFR Cluj were initially deducted 24 points due to financial reasons, but the decision was adjourned by Court of Arbitration for Sport until the conclusion of the insolvency proceedings. CFR Cluj were not eligible to play in Europe as they did not obtain an UEFA license because they filed for insolvency.) (I)	34	16	9	9	46	29	+17	57 (Note: CFR Cluj ahead on head-to-head record; CFR Cluj–Astra Giurgiu 4–1, Astra Giurgiu–CFR Cluj 0–1)	Not granted a license for UEFA Competitions
4	Astra Giurgiu	34	15	12	7	53	27	+26	57	Qualification for the Europa League second qualifying round (Note: The Romanian Cup finalist Universitatea Cluj filed for insolvency, and the other one is Steaua București, so the European spot meant for cup winner will be filled up by the 3rd eligible team from the Liga I and the spot for the third-placed team will be given to the 4th eligible team from the Liga I.)
5	Universitatea Craiova (Note: Teams who have not been given a UEFA license (Brașov, Ceahlăul Piatra Neamț, CFR Cluj, Concordia Chiajna, Universitatea Craiova, Dinamo București, Oțelul Galați, Petrolul Ploiești, Rapid București and Universitatea Cluj) were not eligible to play in European competitions. Petrolul Ploiești, Dinamo București, Rapid București, FC Brașov, Universitatea Cluj and CFR Cluj were not eligible to play in Europe because they filed for insolvency and Universitatea Craiova was not eligible because it was affiliated in 2013.) (I)	34	14	11	9	40	34	+6	53	Not granted a license for UEFA Competitions
6	Petrolul Ploiești (I)	34	14	10	10	42	30	+12	52	Not granted a license for UEFA Competitions
7	Dinamo București (I)	34	13	9	12	47	44	+3	48	Not granted a license for UEFA Competitions
8	Botoșani	34	12	11	11	40	43	−3	47	Qualification for the Europa League first qualifying round
9	Pandurii Târgu Jiu	34	12	9	13	47	42	+5	45	
10	CSMS Iași	34	11	10	13	31	39	−8	43 (Note: CSMS Iași ahead on head-to-head record; CSMS Iași–Viitorul 0–0, Viitorul–CSMS Iași 0–3)	
11	Viitorul	34	11	10	13	44	54	−10	43	
12	Concordia Chiajna (I)	34	9	14	11	39	44	−5	41	Not granted a license for UEFA Competitions
13	Gaz Metan Mediaș (R)	34	8	15	11	29	34	−5	39	Relegation to Liga II
14	Brașov (I, R)	34	9	9	16	33	46	−13	36	Not granted a license for UEFA Competitions and relegation to Liga II
15	Universitatea Cluj (I, R)	34	8	11	15	29	41	−12	35	Not granted a license for UEFA Competitions and relegation to Liga II
16	Rapid București (I, R)	34	8	9	17	21	42	−21	33	Not granted a license for UEFA Competitions and relegation to Liga II
17	Oțelul Galați (I, R)	34	7	11	16	24	45	−21	32	Not granted a license for UEFA Competitions and relegation to Liga II
18	Ceahlăul Piatra Neamț (I, R)	34	6	9	19	25	58	−33	27	Not granted a license for UEFA Competitions and relegation to Liga II

Source: Liga I (in Romanian) UEFA.com (in English)
Rules for classification: 1) points; 2) head-to-head results; 3) goal difference; 4) number of goals scored
(C) Champions; (I) Unable to qualify for UEFA Competitions; (R) Relegated

== Results ==
Home \ Away	TGM	AST	BRA	BOT	CEA	CFR	CON	IAȘ	CRA	DIN	GAZ	OȚE	PAN	PET	RAP	STE	UCL	VII
Târgu Mureș		0–0	1–0	2–1	3–0	2–0	2–0	1–0	2–1	2–1	2–0	1–2	2–1	1–0	1–0	1–0	0–0	6–1
Astra Giurgiu	3–1		5–0	2–0	2–1	0–1	2–2	2–1	5–0	6–1	1–2	4–1	2–1	0–0	2–0	0–0	1–1	0–1
Brașov	2–1	1–1		0–1	0–2	2–2	4–1	2–0	2–3	1–0	0–0	1–1	0–3	0–1	1–2	2–3	1–0	1–3
Botoșani	1–2	1–0	0–0		2–0	0–1	3–0	0–0	2–0	3–2	0–3	1–1	1–1	0–1	3–0	0–2	1–0	4–4
Ceahlăul Piatra Neamț	1–4	1–3	2–2	0–1		0–0	2–0	2–2	2–1	1–1	0–0	0–1	1–1	1–1	0–1	0–1	0–6	1–2
CFR Cluj	2–2	4–1	1–2	4–0	4–0		2–1	4–0	0–0	2–1	4–1	1–0	0–4	0–1	2–1	0–1	1–0	1–2
Concordia Chiajna	0–0	0–2	1–1	3–3	0–1	1–1		2–1	2–2	0–0	2–0	3–0	1–0	3–2	0–0	0–1	0–2	2–0
CSMS Iași	2–2	1–0	1–0	2–2	2–0	0–3	1–2		1–3	1–0	1–0	0–0	3–0	1–5	0–0	0–0	2–0	0–0
Universitatea Craiova	1–0	0–0	0–1	2–1	2–0	3–0	1–1	0–1		0–0	1–1	1–0	1–1	0–2	2–0	0–0	3–0	2–2
Dinamo București	1–1	0–2	2–1	0–0	3–1	1–1	0–3	1–0	1–1		1–1	4–0	3–2	0–0	2–0	1–3	3–0	2–3
Gaz Metan Mediaș	1–0	1–1	2–1	1–1	2–2	0–0	2–0	0–0	1–0	1–2		0–0	0–2	0–0	0–1	1–2	1–1	3–1
Oțelul Galați	0–2	1–1	1–1	0–1	4–1	0–1	1–2	0–0	0–1	0–1	1–1		0–2	1–1	2–0	0–3	2–1	3–0
Pandurii Târgu Jiu	1–1	1–1	2–0	1–2	0–1	0–0	1–1	5–2	0–1	3–2	0–1	4–0		1–1	2–0	3–1	0–1	1–1
Petrolul Ploiești	2–0	1–2	1–0	4–1	2–0	1–2	2–2	0–2	1–2	0–3	1–0	0–0	0–1		0–0	2–3	1–0	1–2
Rapid București	1–2	0–2	0–1	2–2	1–1	0–0	1–0	0–1	1–2	0–3	1–1	2–0	0–3	1–1		1–3	2–1	0–0
Steaua București	0–1	0–0	2–0	2–0	0–1	1–0	2–2	1–0	3–1	3–0	3–1	1–2	6–0	0–1	0–1		4–1	4–1
Universitatea Cluj	0–3	0–0	1–1	0–0	2–0	1–0	0–0	2–0	0–2	2–3	1–1	0–0	2–0	0–3	1–0	0–3		2–2
Viitorul Constanța	0–0	2–0	0–2	1–2	2–0	0–2	2–2	0–3	1–1	0–2	1–0	3–0	4–0	1–3	1–2	0–1	1–1	

Source: LPF (in Romanian)
Legend: Blue = home team win; Yellow = draw; Red = away team win.

== Season statistics ==
=== Scoring ===
- First goal: Kehinde Fatai for Astra Giurgiu against Concordia Chiajna (11th minute, 18:41 EEST) (25 July 2014)
- Most goals scored in a match by a single player: 6 goals
  - Steaua's Claudiu Keșerü became the first player in the club's history to score six goals in a match, breaking a club record that stood 20 years which was previous set by Keșerü's current manager Constantin Gâlcă. Keșerü was also the first player since Marian Popa in 1993 to score six goals in a league game – that feat also featured five goals from open play and the sixth goal being a penalty kick.

==== Top scorers ====
Updated to matches played on 30 May 2015.

Rank	Player	Club	Goals
1	(France) Grégory Tadé	CFR Cluj	18
2	(Romania) Mihai Roman	Pandurii Târgu Jiu	16
3	(Romania) Bogdan Mitrea	Viitorul	14
4	(Romania) Claudiu Keșerü^{1}	Steaua București	12
4	(Senegal) Ousmane N'Doye	Târgu Mureș	12
6	(Poland) Kamil Biliński	Dinamo București	11
6	(Israel) Toto Tamuz	Petrolul Ploiești	11
6	(Romania) Marian Constantinescu	Brașov	11
9	(Romania) Constantin Budescu	Astra Giurgiu	10
10	(Romania) Ioan Hora	Târgu Mureș	9
10	(Romania) Attila Hadnagy	Botoșani	9
10	(Jordan) Tha'er Bawab	Universitatea Craiova	9
10	(Romania) Mihai Dina	Concordia Chiajna	9

^{1} Claudiu Keșerü was transferred to Al-Gharafa during the winter transfer window.

==== Hat-tricks ====
Player	For	Against	Result	Date
(Poland) Kamil Biliński	Dinamo București	Oțelul Galați	4–0	28 July 2014
(Romania) Claudiu Keșerü^{6}	Steaua București	Pandurii Târgu Jiu	6–0	15 August 2014
(Romania) Constantin Budescu	Astra Giurgiu	Universitatea Craiova	5–0	31 August 2014
(Cameroon) Justin Mengolo	Universitatea Cluj	Ceahlăul Piatra Neamț	6–0	6 December 2014
(Romania) Ioan Hora	Târgu Mureș	Viitorul Constanța	6–1	2 May 2015
(Romania) Florin Cernat	Oțelul Galați	Ceahlăul Piatra Neamț	4–1	17 May 2015
(Romania) Mihai Roman	Pandurii Târgu Jiu	CSMS Iași	5–2	24 May 2015

^{6} Player scored 6 goals

=== Clean sheets ===
As of 30 May 2015

Rank	Player	Club	Clean sheets^{*}
1	(Brazil) Peterson Peçanha	Petrolul Ploiești	16
2	(Romania) Eduard Stăncioiu	Târgu Mureș	15
3	(Bosnia and Herzegovina) Branko Grahovac	CSMS Iași	14
4	(Romania) Cristian Bălgrădean	Universitatea Craiova	13
5	(Lithuania) Giedrius Arlauskis	Steaua București	12
6	(Romania) Vasile Curileac	Botoșani	11
6	(Romania) Răzvan Pleșca	Gaz Metan Mediaș	11
8	(Portugal) Mário Felgueiras^{2}	CFR Cluj	9
8	(Romania) Silviu Lung Jr.	Astra Giurgiu	9
8	(Romania) Alexandru Marc	Dinamo București	9
11	(Slovakia) Robert Veselovsky	Universitatea Cluj	8
12	(Czech Republic) Miloš Buchta	Rapid București	7

^{2} Mário Felgueiras was transferred to Konyaspor during the winter transfer window.

^{*} Only goalkeepers who played all 90 minutes of a match are taken into consideration.

=== Discipline ===
As of 30 May 2015

==== Player ====
- Most yellow cards: 12
  - (Brazil) Madson (Universitatea Craiova)
- Most red cards: 3
  - (Argentina) Pablo Brandán (Universitatea Craiova)
  - (Senegal) Ousmane N'Doye (Târgu Mureș)

==== Club ====
- Most yellow cards: 100
  - CFR Cluj
- Most red cards: 14
  - Oțelul Galați

== Champion squad ==
Steaua București

Goalkeepers: Giedrius Arlauskis (Lithuania) (25 / 0); Valentin Cojocaru (7 / 0); Florin Niță (3 / 0).
Defenders: Guilherme Sityá (Brazil) (15 / 0); Srdjan Luchin (9 / 0); Paul Papp (20 / 2); Paul Pârvulescu (6 / 0); Cornel Râpă (16 / 0); Łukasz Szukała (Poland) (16 / 4); Gabriel Tamaș (10 / 0); Alin Toșca (15 / 0); Fernando Varela (Cape Verde) (30 / 3).
Midfielders: Alexandru Bourceanu (11 / 0); Nicandro Breeveld (Suriname) (23 / 0); Alexandru Chipciu (26 / 3); Lucian Filip (16 / 0); Rareș Enceanu (1 / 0); Răzvan Grădinaru (2 / 0); Ionuț Neagu (10 / 0); Adrian Popa (28 / 5); Andrei Prepeliță (27 / 5); Lucian Sânmărtean (14 / 3); Nicolae Stanciu (28 / 6); Cristian Tănase (23 / 5); Robert Vâlceanu (5 / 0).
Forwards: Gabriel Iancu (20 / 3); Claudiu Keșerü (17 / 12); Raul Rusescu (21 / 4); George Țucudean (17 / 3).
(league appearances and goals listed in brackets)

Manager: Constantin Gâlcă.

== Monthly awards ==
Month	Player of the Month		Reference
Month	Player	Club	Reference
July			
August			
September			
October			
November			
December			
February			
March	Kamil Biliński	Dinamo București	
April	Ianis Zicu	ASA Târgu Mureș	
May	Florin Cernat	Oțelul Galați	

== Attendances ==
#	Club	Average	Highest
1	Petrolul	5,971	13,000
2	Craiova	5,882	14,000
3	Dinamo 1948	5,847	25,863
4	Steaua	5,833	38,154
5	Târgu Mureș	4,824	8,000
6	Iași	4,747	10,000
7	FC Rapid	4,735	9,000
8	Oțelul	3,959	10,000
9	Botoșani	3,941	8,000
10	U Cluj	3,553	14,031
11	Pandurii	3,324	8,500
12	CFR Cluj	3,235	10,000
13	Astra	2,336	7,000
14	Gaz Metan	1,959	6,000
15	Brașov	1,579	6,000
16	Concordia	1,512	4,000
17	Ceahlăul	1,318	4,000
18	Viitorul	788	4,000
