= 2012–13 Liga I =

95th season of top-tier football league in Romania

Liga I
- Season: 2012–13
- Champions: Steaua București
- Relegated: Rapid București; Turnu Severin; CSMS Iași; Gloria Bistrița
- Champions League: Steaua București
- Europa League: Pandurii Târgu Jiu; Petrolul Ploiești; Astra Giurgiu
- Matches: 306
- Goals: 816 (2.67 per match)
- Top goalscorer: Raul Rusescu (21)
- Biggest home win: Petrolul 5–0 Ceahlăul; CFR 5–0 Brașov
- Biggest away win: Concordia 0–6 Steaua
- Highest scoring: Petrolul 6–4 Brașov
- Longest winning run: Steaua (6)
- Longest unbeaten run: Petrolul (16)
- Longest losing run: Gloria (8)
- Highest attendance: Steaua 4–0 Brașov (50,224)

The 2012–13 Liga I was the ninety-fifth season of Liga I, the top-level football league of Romania. The season began on 21 July 2012 and ended on 30 May 2013. CFR Cluj were the defending champions.

Since Romania dropped from 14th to 22nd place in the UEFA association coefficient rankings at the end of the 2011–12 season, the league has lost its second UEFA Champions League berth. Further, all teams who will qualify for a European competition via league placement at the end of this season will have to enter these a round earlier as in the season before. The champions will enter the second qualifying round of the 2013–14 UEFA Champions League, while the second- and third-placed teams will begin at the second and first qualifying rounds, respectively, of the 2013–14 UEFA Europa League. In addition, the winners of the 2012–13 Cupa României will also start in the second qualifying round of the Europa League, two rounds earlier than before.

== Teams ==
Four teams from the 2011–12 season were relegated to their respective 2012–13 Liga II division, Târgu Mureș, Mioveni, Voința Sibiu, and Sportul Studențesc București.

Four teams, two from each division, were promoted from 2011–12 Liga II. From the Seria I, CSMS Iași and Viitorul Constanța gained the access because they finished first and second in the standings. From Seria II, the promoted teams where Gloria Bistrița and Turnu Severin. Politehnica Timișoara won their promotion place in the field, but they did not receive their licence for the first league, so the Romanian Football Federation decided that the third team in the division, Turnu Severin, should promote instead.

Team FC Astra Ploiești were renamed FC Astra Giurgiu, effective to 1 July 2012.

=== Venues ===
Steaua București	Universitatea Cluj	CFR Cluj	Turnu Severin
Arena Națională	Cluj Arena	Dr. Constantin Rădulescu	Municipal
Capacity: 55,634	Capacity: 30,201	Capacity: 23,500	Capacity: 20,054
Ceahlăul Piatra Neamț	Viitorul Constanța (Note: Viitorul Constanța was relocated to Farul Stadium from Constanța for this season, because Orășenesc Stadium from Ovidiu didn't meet the licensing rules.)	Petrolul Ploiești	Dinamo București
Ceahlăul	Farul	Ilie Oană	Dinamo
Capacity: 18,000	Capacity: 15,520	Capacity: 15,073	Capacity: 15,032
Oțelul Galați	2012–13 Liga I (Romania) Location of Bucharest teams.		Rapid București
Oțelul	2012–13 Liga I (Romania) Location of Bucharest teams.		Giulești-Valentin Stănescu
Capacity: 13,500	2012–13 Liga I (Romania) Location of Bucharest teams.		Capacity: 11,704 (Note: Capacity of Giulești-Valentin Stănescu Stadium has been reduced from 19,100 to 11,704 due to advanced degradation of the resistance structure of the South End.)
Politehnica Iași	2012–13 Liga I (Romania) Location of Bucharest teams.		Vaslui
Emil Alexandrescu	2012–13 Liga I (Romania) Location of Bucharest teams.		Municipal
Capacity: 11,390	2012–13 Liga I (Romania) Location of Bucharest teams.		Capacity: 9,240
Pandurii Târgu Jiu	2012–13 Liga I (Romania) Location of Bucharest teams.		Brașov
Tudor Vladimirescu	2012–13 Liga I (Romania) Location of Bucharest teams.		Silviu Ploeșteanu
Capacity: 9,200	2012–13 Liga I (Romania) Location of Bucharest teams.		Capacity: 8,800
Astra Giurgiu	Gaz Metan Mediaș	Gloria Bistrița	Concordia Chiajna
Marin Anastasovici	Gaz Metan	Gloria	Concordia
Capacity: 8,500	Capacity: 7,814	Capacity: 7,800	Capacity: 5,123

=== Personnel and kits ===
Note: Flags indicate national team as has been defined under FIFA eligibility rules. Players and Managers may hold more than one non-FIFA nationality.

Team	Manager	Captain	Kit manufacturer	Shirt sponsor
Astra Giurgiu	(Romania) Daniel Isăilă	(Romania) Valerică Găman	Puma	InterAgro
Brașov	(Romania) Adrian Szabo	(Romania) Cristian Munteanu	Puma	Roman
Ceahlăul Piatra Neamț	(Romania) Viorel Hizo	(Romania) Marian Constantinescu	Masita	SuperBet
CFR Cluj	(Romania) Eugen Trică	(Portugal) Cadú	Joma	EnergoBit
Concordia Chiajna	(Romania) Ilie Stan	(Romania) Sorin Ghionea	Nike	—
CSMS Iași	(Romania) Sorin Cârțu	(Romania) Răzvan Tincu	Legea	—
Dinamo București	(Romania) Cornel Țălnar	(Romania) Cătălin Munteanu	Nike	Orange
Gaz Metan Mediaș	(Romania) Gheorghe Mulțescu	(Romania) Cristian Todea	Joma	RomGaz
Gloria Bistrița	(Romania) Nicolae Manea	(Romania) Cornel Predescu	Puma	Gomar
Oțelul Galați	(Romania) Petre Grigoraș	(Romania) Sergiu Costin	Masita	ArcelorMittal
Pandurii Târgu Jiu	(Romania) Cristian Pustai	(Ivory Coast) Ousmane Viera	Nike	USMO
Petrolul Ploiești	(Romania) Cosmin Contra	(France) Sony Mustivar	Macron	Romprest
Rapid București	(Romania) Marian Rada	(Romania) Daniel Pancu	Puma	—
Steaua București	(Romania) Laurențiu Reghecampf	(Romania) Alexandru Bourceanu	Nike	Mihai Nesu Foundation
Turnu Severin	(Romania) Ionel Gane	(Romania) Marius Bălău	Puma	Primăria Severin
Universitatea Cluj	(Romania) Ionel Ganea	(Romania) Zsolt Szilágyi	Nike	Romprest
Vaslui	(Romania) Gavril Balint	(Romania) Lucian Sânmărtean	Adidas	New Holland Agriculture
Viitorul Constanța	(Romania) Cătălin Anghel	(Romania) Nicolae Dică	Puma	—

=== Managerial changes ===
Team	Outgoing manager	Manner of departure	Date of vacancy	Position in table	Incoming manager	Date of appointment
Steaua București	(Romania) Mihai Stoichiță	Contract terminated	21 May 2012	Pre-season	(Romania) Laurențiu Reghecampf	21 May 2012
Concordia Chiajna	(Romania) Laurențiu Reghecampf	Signed by Steaua București	21 May 2012	Pre-season	(Romania) Ilie Stan	8 June 2012
Rapid București	(Romania) Răzvan Lucescu	Signed by El Jaish	21 May 2012	Pre-season	(Romania) Ioan Sabău	18 June 2012
Astra Giurgiu	(Romania) Mircea Rednic	Resigned	23 May 2012	Pre-season	(Romania) Bogdan Stelea	14 June 2012
Petrolul Ploiești	(Romania) Gheorghe Mulțescu	Sacked	24 May 2012	Pre-season	(Romania) Mircea Rednic	29 May 2012
Vaslui	(Portugal) Augusto Inácio	Resigned	4 July 2012	Pre-season	(Romania) Marius Șumudică	5 July 2012
Universitatea Cluj	(Romania) Claudiu Niculescu	Resigned	23 July 2012	17th	(Romania) Cristian Dulca	26 July 2012
Astra Giurgiu	(Romania) Bogdan Stelea	Sacked	10 August 2012	10th	(Romania) Gheorghe Mulțescu	13 August 2012
Turnu Severin	(Romania) Marian Bondrea	Sacked	27 August 2012	16th	(Italy) Nicolò Napoli	27 August 2012
CSMS Iași	(Romania) Ionuț Popa	Resigned	29 August 2012	17th	(Romania) Liviu Ciobotariu	29 August 2012
Oțelul Galați	(Romania) Dorinel Munteanu	Resigned	30 August 2012	15th	(Romania) Viorel Tănase	30 August 2012
Brașov	(Romania) Ionuț Badea	Sacked	23 September 2012	11th	(Romania) Sorin Cârțu	10 October 2012
Vaslui	(Romania) Marius Șumudică	Resigned	24 September 2012	4th	(Romania) Viorel Hizo	28 September 2012
Universitatea Cluj	(Romania) Cristian Dulca	Resigned	1 October 2012	13th	(Romania) Marius Șumudică	10 November 2012
Rapid București	(Romania) Ioan Sabău	Sacked	20 October 2012	8th	(Romania) Marian Rada	20 October 2012
CFR Cluj	(Romania) Ioan Andone	Mutual consent	24 October 2012	10th	(Portugal) Paulo Sérgio	30 October 2012
Petrolul Ploiești	(Romania) Mircea Rednic	Signed by Standard Liège	26 October 2012	6th	(Romania) Cosmin Contra	29 October 2012
Astra Giurgiu	(Romania) Gheorghe Mulțescu	Sacked	29 October 2012	3rd	(Romania) Valentin Sinescu	29 October 2012
Brașov	(Romania) Sorin Cârțu	Resigned	11 November 2012	10th	(Romania) Adrian Szabo	13 November 2012
Dinamo București	(Italy) Dario Bonetti	Sacked	15 November 2012	7th	(Romania) Dorinel Munteanu	15 November 2012
Universitatea Cluj	(Romania) Marius Șumudică	Resigned	15 November 2012	14th	(Romania) Marius Popescu	16 November 2012
Turnu Severin	(Italy) Nicolò Napoli	End of contract	21 December 2012	17th	(Romania) Ionel Gane	9 January 2013
Dinamo București	(Romania) Dorinel Munteanu	Resigned	27 December 2012	7th	(Romania) Cornel Țălnar	28 December 2012
Pandurii Târgu Jiu	(Romania) Petre Grigoraș	Resigned	17 January 2013	4th	(Romania) Cristian Pustai	19 January 2013
Gaz Metan Mediaș	(Romania) Cristian Pustai	Signed by Pandurii Târgu Jiu	19 January 2013	12th	(Romania) Gheorghe Mulțescu	21 January 2013
Oțelul Galați	(Romania) Viorel Tănase	Mutual consent	30 January 2013	13th	(Romania) Petre Grigoraș	30 January 2013
Universitatea Cluj	(Romania) Marius Popescu	End of caretaker spell	31 January 2013	16th	(Romania) Ionel Ganea	31 January 2013
Astra Giurgiu	(Romania) Valentin Sinescu	Sacked	6 April 2013	2nd	(Romania) Marin Barbu	6 April 2013
Vaslui	(Romania) Viorel Hizo	Resigned	7 April 2013	6th	(Romania) Gavril Balint	9 April 2013
CFR Cluj	(Portugal) Paulo Sérgio	Sacked	13 April 2013	8th	(Romania) Eugen Trică	13 April 2013
Astra Giurgiu	(Romania) Marin Barbu	Sacked	13 April 2013	2nd	(Romania) Daniel Isăilă	13 April 2013
CSMS Iași	(Romania) Liviu Ciobotariu	Sacked	20 April 2013	17th	(Romania) Sorin Cârțu	22 April 2013
Ceahlăul	(Romania) Costel Enache	Sacked	12 May 2013	13th	(Romania) Viorel Hizo	12 May 2013

== League table ==
Pos	Team	Pld	W	D	L	GF	GA	GD	Pts	Qualification or relegation
1	Steaua București (C)	34	24	7	3	74	29	+45	79	Qualification to Champions League second qualifying round
2	Pandurii Târgu Jiu	34	19	6	9	57	43	+14	63	Qualification to Europa League second qualifying round
3	Petrolul Ploiești	34	16	14	4	60	34	+26	62	Qualification to Europa League second qualifying round
4	Astra Giurgiu	34	17	9	8	64	37	+27	60	Qualification to Europa League first qualifying round (Note: Astra Giurgiu qualified for the first qualifying round of the 2013–14 UEFA Europa as Petrolul won the 2012–13 Cupa României and secured a place in the second qualifying round of the 2013–14 UEFA Europa.)
5	Vaslui	34	16	10	8	50	34	+16	58	
6	Dinamo București	34	16	8	10	48	40	+8	56	
7	Brașov	34	14	9	11	50	51	−1	51	
8	Rapid București (R)	34	13	10	11	35	35	0	49 (Note: CFR 0-0 RAP; RAP 3-2 CFR)	Relegation to Liga II (Note: Rapid did not obtain a licence for the 2013–14 season, therefore Concordia Chiajna were spared from relegation.)
9	CFR Cluj	34	12	13	9	56	39	+17	49	
10	Gaz Metan Mediaș	34	12	10	12	42	46	−4	46	
11	Oțelul Galați (Note: Oțelul Galați were deducted two points because of debts owed to agent Codoban Tătar Ionel.)	34	11	10	13	38	42	−4	41	
12	Universitatea Cluj	34	10	8	16	39	55	−16	38	
13	Viitorul Constanța	34	8	12	14	45	57	−12	36	
14	Ceahlăul Piatra Neamț	34	9	7	18	41	59	−18	34	
15	Concordia Chiajna	34	7	12	15	29	49	−20	33	Spared from relegation
16	Turnu Severin (R)	34	7	11	16	36	47	−11	32	Relegation to Liga II
17	CSMS Iași (R)	34	7	5	22	31	50	−19	26	Relegation to Liga II
18	Gloria Bistrița (R)	34	3	9	22	21	69	−48	18	Relegation to Liga II

Source: Liga I (in Romanian)
Rules for classification: 1) points; 2) head-to-head points; 3) head-to-head goal difference; 4) head-to-head goals scored; 5) goal difference; 6) number of goals scored.
(C) Champions; (R) Relegated

=== Positions by round ===
Team ╲ Round	1	2	3	4	5	6	7	8	9	10	11	12	13	14	15	16	17	18	19	20	21	22	23	24	25	26	27	28	29	30	31	32	33	34
Steaua București	5	3	2	2	1	2	2	1	1	1	1	1	1	1	1	1	1	1	1	1	1	1	1	1	1	1	1	1	1	1	1	1	1	1
Pandurii Târgu Jiu	2	1	1	1	1	1	1	2	2	2	2	2	2	3	2	2	3	4	4	3	3	3	3	3	5	4	3	2	3	3	2	2	2	2
Petrolul Ploiești	1	6	4	5	5	9	8	6	7	9	8	6	4	5	6	5	6	5	6	5	4	5	4	4	3	2	4	3	2	2	4	4	3	3
Astra Giurgiu	3	7	8	10	7	5	3	3	3	3	3	4	3	2	3	3	2	2	2	2	2	2	2	2	2	3	2	4	5	4	3	3	4	4
Vaslui	7	4	8	11	6	3	4	4	4	4	4	3	5	4	4	4	4	3	3	4	5	6	6	6	6	6	6	6	6	6	6	6	5	5
Dinamo București	3	2	3	4	4	3	5	8	5	5	5	5	6	7	7	8	7	7	7	7	6	4	5	5	4	5	5	5	4	5	5	5	6	6
Brașov	7	5	6	9	12	13	9	11	9	10	9	7	8	10	10	9	9	8	8	9	8	9	9	9	9	9	9	8	8	8	8	7	7	7
Rapid București	7	10	6	8	10	7	10	7	10	7	6	8	9	9	8	7	8	9	9	8	9	8	8	8	7	7	7	7	7	7	7	9	9	8
CFR Cluj	11	10	5	3	3	6	7	5	8	6	7	10	7	6	5	6	5	6	5	6	7	7	7	7	8	8	8	9	9	9	9	8	8	9
Gaz Metan Mediaș	11	14	14	14	11	8	11	12	13	11	12	14	12	12	13	14	12	12	12	11	11	10	10	10	10	10	10	10	10	10	10	10	10	10
Oțelul Galați	6	9	13	15	15	15	16	16	16	15	15	15	15	15	15	13	14	14	13	13	12	11	11	11	11	11	11	11	11	11	11	11	11	11
Universitatea Cluj	17	8	12	7	9	11	6	10	12	13	11	12	13	14	14	15	15	16	16	16	16	14	14	12	12	12	12	13	12	12	12	12	12	12
Viitorul Constanța	7	10	11	13	14	12	13	13	11	12	13	11	11	11	11	11	11	11	11	12	13	13	13	15	14	13	13	14	14	16	14	13	13	13
Ceahlăul Piatra Neamț	18	15	16	12	13	14	15	14	14	14	14	13	14	13	12	12	13	13	14	14	14	15	15	14	15	14	14	12	13	13	13	14	14	14
Concordia Chiajna	16	13	8	6	8	10	12	9	6	8	10	9	10	8	9	10	10	10	10	10	10	12	12	13	13	15	15	15	15	14	15	15	15	15
Turnu Severin	13	16	17	16	16	17	17	17	17	18	18	18	18	18	18	18	18	18	17	17	17	17	17	17	17	17	16	16	16	15	16	16	16	16
CSMS Iași	13	18	18	18	17	16	18	18	18	17	17	17	17	17	16	16	16	15	15	15	15	16	16	16	16	16	17	17	17	17	17	17	17	17
Gloria Bistrița	13	16	15	17	18	18	14	15	15	16	16	16	16	16	17	17	17	17	18	18	18	18	18	18	18	18	18	18	18	18	18	18	18	18

Leader
2013–14 UEFA Europa League Second qualifying round
2013–14 UEFA Europa League First qualifying round
Relegation to 2013–14 Liga II

== Results ==
Home \ Away	AST	BRA	CEA	CFR	CON	IAȘ	DIN	GAZ	GBI	OȚE	PAN	PET	RAP	STE	TUR	UCL	VAS	VII
Astra Giurgiu		3–0	4–2	3–3	6–3	1–0	1–0	4–0	4–0	0–0	4–1	1–1	3–2	3–4	1–1	1–2	1–1	2–0
Brașov	1–2		1–0	0–0	3–2	1–0	2–2	3–1	4–1	3–2	0–1	0–1	2–0	3–1	2–1	0–0	2–1	3–1
Ceahlăul Piatra Neamț	3–2	2–1		2–2	3–0	1–0	0–0	2–1	2–0	4–1	0–1	0–2	0–0	3–4	1–0	2–1	0–2	0–3
CFR Cluj	0–2	5–0	3–2		1–1	2–2	0–1	1–1	5–1	0–1	2–3	2–2	0–0	0–0	1–3	3–1	3–0	0–1
Concordia Chiajna	0–2	2–1	2–1	1–2		1–1	0–0	0–1	2–1	0–0	0–1	1–1	0–0	0–6	1–1	0–2	1–1	1–1
CSMS Iași	0–2	1–2	1–0	1–1	0–1		1–1	0–2	2–1	1–2	0–1	2–2	0–1	0–3	1–0	4–0	1–2	1–2
Dinamo București	1–0	2–1	1–1	0–1	2–0	5–2		2–0	1–2	2–1	3–0	2–1	2–1	0–2	4–2	1–1	0–1	2–3
Gaz Metan Mediaș	2–1	0–0	3–1	1–1	1–3	0–1	2–2		3–1	1–2	0–2	2–0	1–1	1–1	2–0	2–1	1–0	4–1
Gloria Bistrița	1–2	1–1	0–0	0–5	1–3	1–0	1–2	1–1		2–1	1–3	1–1	0–1	0–1	0–0	0–0	0–3	1–1
Oțelul Galați	2–1	0–0	3–2	1–2	2–1	0–3	0–1	2–0	1–1		1–0	0–1	1–1	1–1	2–0	0–2	2–0	1–1
Pandurii Târgu Jiu	1–1	2–3	3–1	2–1	2–1	3–1	2–0	1–1	4–0	3–2		1–3	2–0	0–0	2–2	6–2	2–1	4–1
Petrolul Ploiești	1–1	6–4	5–0	1–1	0–0	2–1	2–1	1–1	4–0	2–1	4–0		0–0	1–2	1–0	2–0	0–0	3–0
Rapid București	0–2	1–2	2–0	3–2	0–0	1–0	0–1	2–1	3–1	2–3	2–0	0–0		1–1	1–0	1–4	2–2	2–1
Steaua București	2–0	4–0	3–0	1–0	1–0	3–1	3–1	3–0	4–0	2–1	2–0	2–2	1–0		2–1	5–1	1–0	2–5
Turnu Severin	0–0	2–1	1–1	1–3	0–1	2–1	1–2	2–0	1–0	1–1	1–3	2–2	0–1	1–1		1–1	2–0	2–2
Universitatea Cluj	1–3	1–1	1–0	1–2	1–0	0–2	1–2	3–4	1–0	1–1	1–1	2–4	1–2	0–1	1–0		2–1	2–1
Vaslui	2–1	1–1	4–3	0–0	3–0	3–0	4–1	1–1	1–1	1–0	0–0	3–0	1–0	3–1	2–1	1–0		3–2
Viitorul Constanța	0–0	2–2	2–2	0–2	1–1	1–0	1–1	0–1	2–0	0–0	2–0	1–2	1–2	0–4	3–4	1–1	2–2	

Source: LPF (in Romanian)
Legend: Blue = home team win; Yellow = draw; Red = away team win.

== Top goalscorers ==
Rank	Player	Club	Goals
1	(Romania) Raul Rusescu	Steaua București	21
2	(Democratic Republic of the Congo) Jeremy Bokila	Petrolul Ploiești	16
3	(Romania) Marius Alexe	Dinamo București	15
4	(Nigeria) Kehinde Fatai	Astra Giurgiu	14
5	(Tunisia) Hamza Younés	Petrolul Ploiești	13
6	(Romania) Constantin Budescu	Astra Giurgiu	12
7	(Romania) Marius Niculae^{1}	Vaslui	11
7	(Romania) Mugurel Buga	Brașov	11
7	(Bosnia and Herzegovina) Bojan Golubović	Ceahlăul Piatra Neamț	11
10	(Jordan) Tha'er Bawab	Gaz Metan Mediaș	10
10	(Lithuania) Deivydas Matulevičius	Pandurii Târgu Jiu	10
10	(Romania) Nicolae Dică	Viitorul Constanța	10
10	(Romania) Victoraș Astafei	Gaz Metan Mediaș / Oțelul Galați	10

^{1} Marius Niculae was transferred to Shandong Luneng during the winter transfer window.

== Champion squad ==
Steaua București

Goalkeepers: Valentin Cojocaru (3 / 0); Răzvan Stanca (4 / 0); Ciprian Tătărușanu (28 / 0).
Defenders: Doru Bratu (2 / 0); Vlad Chiricheș (26 / 1); Andrei Dumitraș (5 / 0); Florin Gardoș (21 / 1); Daniel Georgievski (North Macedonia) (19 / 0); Iasmin Latovlevici (24 / 2); Valeriu Lupu (2 / 0); Novak Martinović (Serbia) (5 / 1); Gabriel Matei (1 / 0); Paul Pârvulescu (12 / 0); Cornel Râpă (8 / 0); Łukasz Szukała (Poland) (20 / 4).
Midfielders: Tiberiu Bălan (5 / 0); Alexandru Bourceanu (32 / 3); Alexandru Chipciu (27 / 6); Lucian Filip (17 / 0); Ionuț Năstăsie (2 / 0); Mihai Pintilii (30 / 5); Adrian Popa (30 / 1); Andrei Prepeliță (18 / 1); Cristian Tănase (29 / 8).
Forwards: Florin Costea (1 / 0); Mihai Costea (12 / 2); Gabriel Iancu (10 / 2); Adi Rocha (Brazil) (16 / 9); Leandro Tatu (Brazil) (9 / 2); Stefan Nikolić (Montenegro) (24 / 5); Raul Rusescu (34 / 21).
(league appearances and goals listed in brackets)

Manager: Laurențiu Reghecampf.

== Statistics ==
=== Scoring ===
- First goal of the season: (Nigeria) John Ibeh (Pandurii Târgu Jiu) against Universitatea Cluj
- Hat-tricks of the season:
  - (Tunisia) Hamza Younés (Petrolul Ploiești) against Ceahlăul Piatra Neamț (stage 1)
  - (Romania) George Țucudean (Dinamo București) against CSMS Iași (4 goals, stage 2)
  - (North Macedonia) Mirko Ivanovski (Astra Giurgiu) against Concordia Chiajna (stage 6)
  - (Romania) Marius Niculae (Vaslui) against Concordia Chiajna (stage 10)
  - (Romania) Marius Onofraș (CSMS Iași) against Oțelul Galați (stage 18)
  - (Romania) Marius Pena (Oțelul Galați) against Rapid București (stage 19)
  - (France) Robert Maah (CFR Cluj) against Universitatea Cluj (stage 34)

== Attendances ==
#	Club	Average
1	Steaua	21,099
2	Petrolul	11,642
3	Dinamo 1948	11,134
4	CFR Cluj	4,929
5	Pandurii	4,794
6	Oțelul	4,706
7	Drobeta	4,147
8	U Cluj	3,997
9	FC Rapid	3,971
10	Iași	3,735
11	Vaslui	3,289
12	Brașov	2,588
13	Astra	2,450
14	Ceahlăul	2,394
15	Viitorul	2,271
16	Gaz Metan	2,206
17	Concordia	2,032
18	Gloria	1,929
