= Peterson Peçanha =

Brazilian footballer

Personal information
- Full name: Peterson dos Santos Peçanha
- Date of birth: 11 January 1980 (age 46)
- Place of birth: São Gonçalo, Brazil
- Height: 1.82 m (6 ft 0 in)
- Position: Goalkeeper

Youth career
- 1992–1999: Flamengo

Senior career*
Years	Team	Apps	(Gls)
2000–2001	Flamengo	0	(0)
2002	Bangu	8	(0)
2002	América-RJ	6	(0)
2003	Novo Horizonte	7	(0)
2004	Ríver	3	(0)
2005	São Raimundo-AM	2	(0)
2005–2008	Paços Ferreira	60	(0)
2008–2009	Thrasyvoulos	19	(0)
2009–2012	Marítimo	56	(0)
2012–2013	Rapid București	25	(0)
2013–2016	Petrolul Ploiești	86	(0)
2016	Viitorul Constanța	6	(0)
2016–2017	Feirense	9	(0)
2017–2018	Académico Viseu	34	(0)
2018–2019	Académica	20	(0)
Total		341	(0)

Managerial career
- 2019: Trofense
- * Club domestic league appearances and goals

Peterson dos Santos Peçanha (born 11 January 1980) is a Brazilian former professional footballer who played as a goalkeeper.

== Playing career ==
Born in São Gonçalo, Rio de Janeiro, Peçanha began his career with Clube de Regatas do Flamengo, but did not make any official appearances for the side. In 2001, he signed for Bangu Atlético Clube, again failing to have an impact, and subsequently moved on to América Football Club also in Rio de Janeiro.

Peçanha played for three modest clubs in the next three years: Novo Horizonte Futebol Clube, Ríver Atlético Clube and São Raimundo Esporte Clube (AM). In 2005, he was bought by F.C. Paços de Ferreira of Portugal, initially as a backup to youth product Pedro. He made his Primeira Liga debut for the team against C.D. Nacional, in a 0–1 home loss on 21 August 2005.

After impressive performances for the northerners, Peçanha eventually became first choice. In the 2006–07 season, he did not miss one minute of action as the club finished in sixth position, qualifying for the UEFA Cup; he continued to start for the duration of his spell.

Peçanha changed countries again in July 2008, joining Thrasyvoulos F.C. from Greece. After only one season, which ended in relegation from the Super League, he returned to Portugal, with C.S. Marítimo. On 16 August 2009, he made his official debut, at S.L. Benfica in the season opener; he earned himself the Player of the match award in that game, notably saving a penalty from Óscar Cardozo in a 1–1 draw– the islanders finished in fifth position and qualified for European competition.

After leaving the island of Madeira in the summer of 2012, Peçanha went on to spend several years in the Romanian Liga I, in representation of FC Rapid București, FC Petrolul Ploiești and FC Viitorul Constanța. He then returned to Portugal, where he played in quick succession for C.D. Feirense (top division), Académico de Viseu F.C. and Académica de Coimbra (both in the LigaPro).

== Coaching career ==
After retiring at the age of 39, Peçanha returned to Paços de Ferreira as a goalkeeper coach. In September 2019, he was appointed manager of Portuguese third-level team C.D. Trofense. Only one month later, after four games and no wins, he was dismissed.

== Honours ==
Individual

- Liga I Best goalkeeper: 2014–15
