= Dolhasca =

- Town
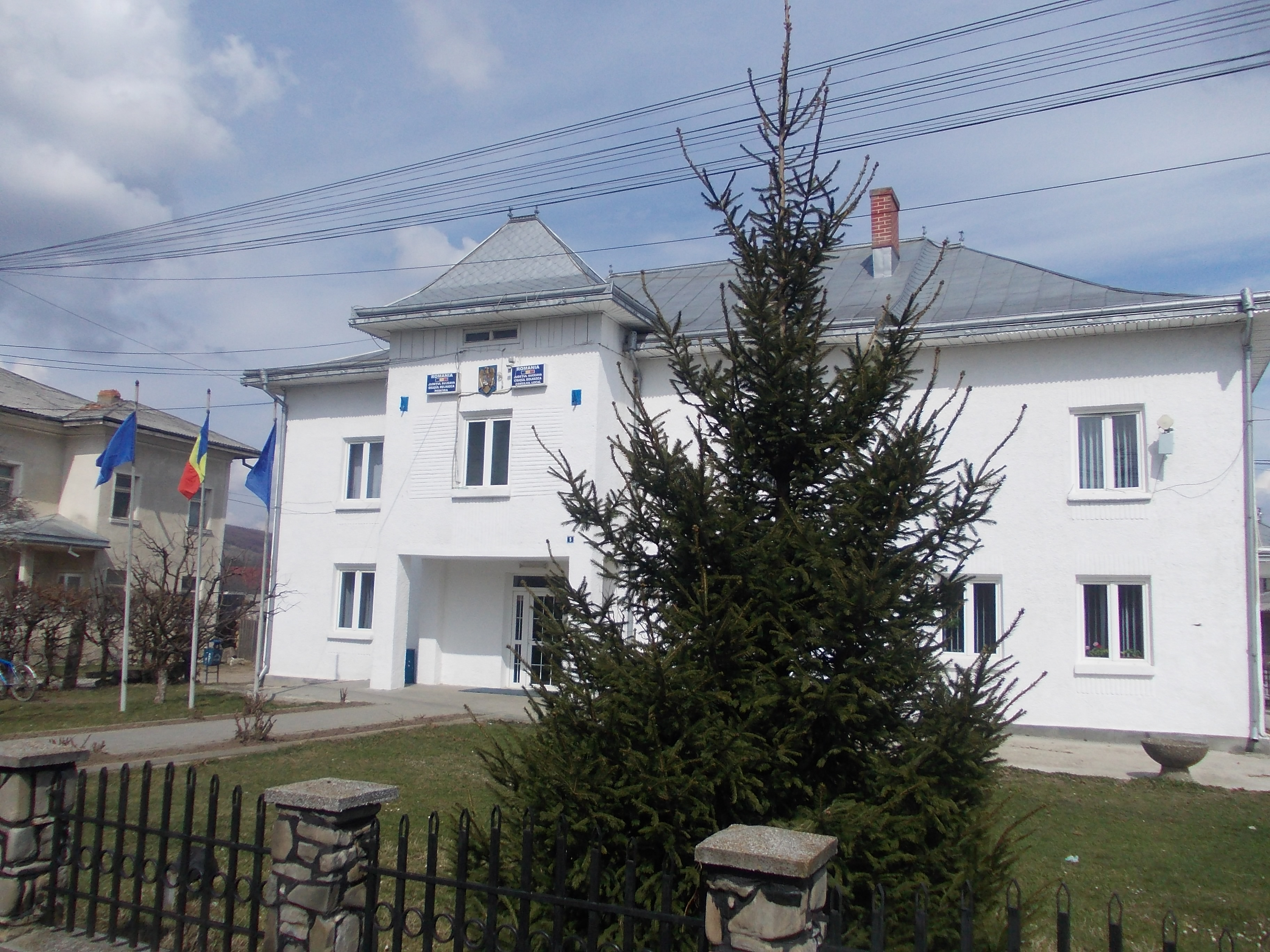
- Dolhasca Town Hall

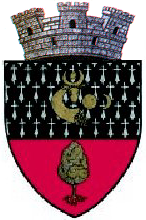
- Coat of arms

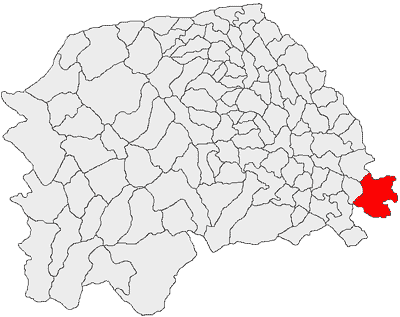
- Location in Suceava County

- Location in Romania
- Coordinates: 47°25′49″N 26°36′34″E
- Country: Romania
- County: Suceava

Government
  - Mayor (2024–2028): Decebal Isachi (PNL)
- Area: 110.35 km^{2} (42.61 sq mi)
- Elevation: 233 m (764 ft)
- Population (2021-12-01): 11,007
  - Density: 99.746/km^{2} (258.34/sq mi)
- Time zone: UTC+02:00 (EET)
  - Summer (DST): UTC+03:00 (EEST)
- Postal code: 727170
- Area code: (+40) 02 30
- Vehicle reg.: SV
- Website: www.primariadolhasca.ro

Dolhasca (Romanian pronunciation: [dolˈhaska]) is a town in Suceava County, in the historical region of Western Moldavia, northeastern Romania. Dolhasca is the eighth largest urban settlement in the county, with a population of 11,007 inhabitants as of 2021. It was declared a town in 2004, along with seven other localities in Suceava County. The town administers seven villages, namely: Budeni, Gulia, Poiana, Poienari, Probota, Siliștea Nouă, and Valea Poienei.

Despite being a town, Dolhasca looks like a rural settlement in many aspects, and the main occupation of the inhabitants is agriculture. The Probota Monastery, built in 1530 by the Moldavian ruler Petru Rareș, and located close to the town, is one of the Churches of Moldavia UNESCO World Heritage Site.

== Demographics ==
Historical population
Year	Pop.	±%
2002	11,009	—
2011	10,298	−6.5%
2021	11,007	+6.9%
Source: Census data

In 2002, Dolhasca had a population of 11,009 inhabitants, 90% of which were Romanians and the rest Roma. At that time, it was one of the most populated rural localities in Suceava County. At the 2021 census, the town had a population of 11,007; of those, 81.07% were Romanians and 12,43% Roma.

== Administration and local politics ==
=== Town council ===
The town's current local council has the following multi-party political composition, based on the results of the votes cast at the 2020 Romanian local elections:

Party	Seats	Current Council
National Liberal Party (PNL)	9	
Social Democratic Party (PSD)	3	
People's Movement Party (PMP)	2	
PRO Romania (PRO)	1	
Party of the Roma (PRPE)	1	
Independent politician (Juncă Maria)	1	

== Natives ==
- Alexandru Arșinel (1939–2022), comedian and actor
- Constantin Arseni (1912–1994), neurosurgeon
- Constantin Ferariu (born 1986), footballer
