= Olimpiu Bucur =

Romanian footballer

Personal information
- Date of birth: April 1, 1989 (age 37)
- Place of birth: Apahida, Romania
- Position: Midfielder

Team information
- Current team: CS Florești

Senior career*
Years	Team	Apps	(Gls)
2011–2013	Pandurii Târgu Jiu	1	(0)
2012	→ Voința Sibiu (loan)	5	(0)
2013–2015	Gloria Bistrița	12	(0)
2015–2016	Sighetu Marmației	10	(1)
2016–2017	Unirea Jucu	10	(1)
2017–2018	Dacia Unirea Brăila	18	(4)
2018–	CS Florești	11	(2)
- * Club domestic league appearances and goals as of 31 August 2018

Olimpiu Bucur (born 1 April 1989) is a Romanian footballer who plays as a midfielder for CS Florești.
