= CSM Sighetu Marmației =

Romanian football club

- Full name: Clubul Sportiv Municipal; Sighetu Marmației
- Nickname: Sighetenii
- Founded: 1996; 30 years ago as Marmația Sighetu Marmației; 2013; 13 years ago as CSM Sighetu Marmației; 2019; 7 years ago (refounded)
- Ground: Municipal "Solovan"
- Capacity: 5,000
- Owner: Sighetu Marmației Municipality
- General manager: Sergiu Bodea
- Manager: Flavius Sabău
- League: Liga III
- 2025–26: Liga III, Seria VIII, 7th
- Website: https://www.csmsighet.ro/
Home colours	Away colours

Clubul Sportiv Municipal Sighetu Marmației, commonly known as CSM Sighetu Marmației, or simply as Sighetu Marmației (Romanian pronunciation: [ˌsiɡetu marˈmat͡si.ej], is a Romanian football club based in Sighetu Marmației, Maramureș County, currently playing in the Liga III.

== History ==
The club was founded in 1996 to continue the football tradition in Sighetu Marmației after the dissolution of CIL Sighetu Marmației, a team which played for many years in Liga II.

Sighet began the 2015–16 season aiming for promotion, but it turned out to be disastrous, with the team facing frequent changes on the coaching bench and underwhelming results. The team started with Michele Bon as head coach, and among the players were Began, Turda, Panțîru, and Bucur. Bon left the team after four rounds and was replaced by Dan Dobai for the next five, while assistant coach Cosmin Marincean managed the team for one round. Valentin Sinescu was then appointed head coach from the eleventh round. Although the squad was strengthened during the winter break with Ferariu, Goia, Chiacu, and Cârstoiu, Sinescu was eventually replaced by Marius Popescu before the start of the second half of the campaign. However, on 13 May 2016, due to a lack of funds after the withdrawal of municipal financing, CSM Sighetu Marmației withdrew from Liga III and was dissolved.

In the summer of 2019, after three years of inactivity, the football section of CSM Sighetu Marmației was refounded and enrolled in Liga IV – Maramureș County, with Neluțu Hotea as head coach. The team led the North Series of the 2019–20 season, which was suspended in March 2020 due to the COVID-19 pandemic, and was designated to play the county final against the South Series leaders Progresul Șomcuta Mare, losing 5–6 on penalties after a 1–1 draw.

The 2020–21 season was initially postponed due to the high costs caused by the COVID-19 pandemic, but on 7 April 2021 the FRF approved a new, lower-cost protocol for the county leagues. Under newly appointed head coach Romulus Buia, the team won the short tournament organized by AJF Maramureș, defeating Lăpușul Târgu Lăpuș 3–0 in the final, before losing the promotion/relegation play-off to Progresul Șomcuta Mare, the 9th-placed team in Series X of Liga III, 2–6 on aggregate.

In the 2021–22 season, Sighetenii won the North Series and secured the Liga IV – Maramureș County title after once again defeating Lăpușul Târgu Lăpuș 2–1 in the league final at Viorel Mateianu Stadium in Baia Mare, and promoted to Liga III by overcoming Rapid Jibou, the champions of Sălaj County, winning both legs of the promotion play-off, 3–0 away and 2–0 at home, under head coach Cristian Bogdan.

Adrian Iencsi was appointed head coach for the 2022–23 season, leading CSM Sighetu Marmației to a 7th-place finish in Series X of Liga III, both after the regular season and the play-out stage, before leaving the team at the end of his tenure.

In July 2023, George Zima took over as head coach, guiding the team to 4th place in the regular season of Series X and qualification for the play-off, where they finished 2nd and reached the promotion play-offs, being eliminated in the first round by Gloria Bistrița, losing 3–5 on penalties after a 0–0 home draw and a 1–1 away draw. In the 2024–25 campaign, he led the team to a 5th-place finish in Series X of Liga III, both after the regular season and the play-out stage.

Zima was replaced during the winter break of the 2025–26 campaign, leaving the team in 6th place in the regular season of Series VIII, as Flavius Sabău was appointed the new head coach.

== Honours ==
Liga III

- Runners-up (1): 2023–24

Liga IV – Maramureș County

- Winners (7): 2000–01, 2004–05, 2006–07, 2010–11, 2013–14, 2020–21, 2021–22

== Players ==
=== First-team squad ===
As of 10 September 2024

Note: Flags indicate national team as defined under FIFA eligibility rules; some limited exceptions apply. Players may hold more than one non-FIFA nationality.

No.	Pos.	Nation	Player
2	MF	ROU	Luca Buciuman
5	DF	ROU	Gheorghe Tomșa
7	DF	ROU	Cristian Catrina
8	MF	EST	Deivid Andreas
9	FW	ROU	Victor Mare
11	MF	ROU	Ianis Negruț
12	GK	ROU	Mihai Oneț (on loan from CFR Cluj)
14	FW	ROU	Leonardo Mitruscsák (Captain)
16	MF	ROU	Răzvan Mărieș
17	FW	CIV	Theo Yolou
18	FW	ROU	Nándor Süveg
21	FW	ALG	Djamal Amrichate

No.	Pos.	Nation	Player
23	DF	ROU	Alberto Brașoveanu
27	DF	ROU	Alexandru Rojniță
30	MF	ROU	Simion Pop
31	DF	SEN	Pape Ndiaye
33	GK	ROU	Iuliu Roșiianu
38	FW	UKR	Ihor Liubashov
44	MF	GHA	Razak Abdullah
72	GK	ROU	Iosif Berințan
88	MF	ROU	Cătălin Șofroni
91	MF	ALG	Cristopher Saidani
99	MF	ROU	Paul Szecui

=== Out on loan ===
Note: Flags indicate national team as defined under FIFA eligibility rules; some limited exceptions apply. Players may hold more than one non-FIFA nationality.

No. / Pos. / Nation / Player	No. / Pos. / Nation / Player

== Club officials ==
=== Board of directors ===
Role	Name
Owner	(Romania) Sighetu Marmației Municipality
President	(Romania) Petru Opriș
General manager	(Romania) Sergiu Bodea

=== Current technical staff ===
Role	Name
Manager	(Romania) Flavius Sabău
Assistant manager	(Romania) Cosmin Mărincean
Goalkeeping coach	(Romania) Vasile Șleam
Fitness coach	(Romania) Laur Nemeș

== League and Cup history ==
Season	Tier	Division	Place	Notes	Cupa României
2025–26	3	Liga III (Seria VIII)	TBD		
2024–25	3	Liga III (Seria X)	5th		
2023–24	3	Liga III (Seria X)	2nd		
2022–23	3	Liga III (Seria X)	7th		
2021–22	4	Liga IV (MM)	1st (C, P)	Promoted	
2020–21	4	Liga IV (MM)	1st (C)		Second round

== Former managers ==
- (Romania) Daniel Iftodi (2007–2009)
- (Romania) Sorin Cigan (2013–2014)
- (Romania) Dan Dobai (2014−2015)
- (Italy) Michele Bon (2015)
- (Romania) Dan Dobai (2015)
- (Romania) Valentin Sinescu (2015−2016)
- (Romania) Marius Popescu (2016)
- (Romania) Neluțu Hotea (2019−2020)
- (Romania) Romulus Buia (2021)
- (Romania) Cristian Bogdan (2021–2022)
- (Romania) Adrian Iencsi (2022–2023)
- (Romania) George Zima (2023–2025)
- (Romania) Flavius Sabău (2026)
