= Constantin Ferariu =

Romanian footballer

Personal information
- Date of birth: 23 September 1986 (age 40)
- Place of birth: Dolhasca, Romania
- Height: 1.74 m (5 ft 8 1/2 in)
- Position: Defender

Team information
- Current team: Pașcani (player-manager)
- Number: 6

Youth career
- Laminorul Roman

Senior career*
Years	Team	Apps	(Gls)
2009–2011	Ceahlăul Piatra Neamţ	13	(1)
2011–2012	Callatis Mangalia	2	(0)
2012–2015	Rapid CFR Suceava	50	(1)
2016	Sighetu Marmaţiei	0	(0)
2016	Berceni	9	(0)
2017–2020	Siretul Dolhasca	0	(0)
2020–	Pașcani	13	(0)

Managerial career
- 2021–: Pașcani
- * Club domestic league appearances and goals as of 30 April 2021

Constantin Ferariu (born 23 September 1986) is a Romanian footballer who plays as a defender for CSM Pașcani.
