= Mihai Teja =

Romanian footballer and manager

Personal information
- Full name: Mihai Răzvan Teja
- Date of birth: 22 September 1978 (age 48)
- Place of birth: Bucharest, Romania
- Position: Midfielder

Youth career
- Years: Team
- 1985–1997: Steaua București

Managerial career
- 2000–2003: Dinamo București (youth)
- 2004–2005: Dinamo II București (fitness coach)
- 2005–2006: Vaslui (fitness coach)
- 2006–2007: Dinamo București (assistant)
- 2007–2010: Steaua București (assistant)
- 2010–2011: Khazar Lankaran (assistant)
- 2012: Astra Ploiești (assistant)
- 2012: Petrolul Ploiești (assistant)
- 2012–2013: Standard Liège (assistant)
- 2013: Astra Giurgiu (assistant)
- 2013–2014: Universitatea Cluj
- 2014: Romania U21
- 2015: Dinamo București
- 2015–2016: Universitatea Cluj
- 2017: Excel Mouscron (assistant)
- 2017: Pandurii Târgu Jiu
- 2018: Gaz Metan Mediaș
- 2018–2019: FCSB
- 2019: Politehnica Iași
- 2020: Voluntari
- 2021: Gaz Metan Mediaș
- 2022: Botoșani
- 2024–2025: Vejle
- 2025–2026: Metaloglobus București

Mihai Răzvan Teja (born 22 September 1978) is a Romanian professional football manager.

== Club career ==
After Teja finished his youth years at Steaua București and was starting to be integrated into the first team squad, he was diagnosed with Wolff–Parkinson–White syndrome, a heart disorder that did not allow him to play professional sports, thus he had to put an end to his playing career without making a single appearance.

== Coaching career ==
Teja decided to finish his studies and got a master's degree and a doctorate at the National University of Physical Education and Sport. While at college, he returned to football and joined Dinamo București, where he became youth coach at the club's academy. While there, he met Walter Zenga, who recommended him to Coverciano, where he got degrees as a football manager and a fitness coach.

After Coverciano, he returned to Dinamo, where he was assistant manager at the second team of the club. In 2006, Teja began a collaboration with Mircea Rednic, helping him as assistant and fitness coach at FC Vaslui and Dinamo București. After that he moved to Steaua București, where he was the assistant coach of Marius Lăcătuș, Dorinel Munteanu and Cristiano Bergodi.

In 2010, after Ilie Dumitrescu was named the head coach of Steaua and came with his own technical staff, Teja left the club and was reunited with Mircea Rednic, at Khazar Lankaran. They returned to Romania in 2012, at Petrolul Ploiești, and then they moved to Belgium, at Standard Liège. In 2013, Teja separated from Rednic and joined Astra Giurgiu, under the management of Daniel Isăilă.

== Managerial career ==
He made his debut as head coach at the Liga I side Universitatea Cluj in October 2013. He ended his contract in September 2014.

In November 2014, Teja was appointed head coach of the Romania national under-21 team. He managed the team for a friendly game against Serbia U21, in Belgrade, won by Romania 1–0. After only one game in charge, he ended his contract with the Romanian Football Federation. In January 2015, Teja signed a contract with Dinamo București, but was sacked only two months later.

In December 2018, after a good first half of the season with Gaz Metan Mediaș, Teja accepted a one-and-a-half-year contract offer from FCSB, following the departure of former coach Nicolae Dică.

On 9 January 2020, Teja replaced Bergodi as the head coach of Liga I side Voluntari.

On 24 September 2024, Teja was named new manager of Danish Superliga club Vejle Boldklub. He was sacked on 9 February 2025.

== Managerial statistics ==
As of match played 28 February 2026

Team	From	To	Record							
Team	From	To	G	W	D	L	GF	GA	GD	Win %
(Romania) Universitatea Cluj	23 October 2013	3 September 2014	30	14	5	11	30	29	+1	46.67
Romania U21	6 November 2014	19 December 2014	1	1	0	0	1	0	+1	100.00
(Romania) Dinamo București	7 January 2015	12 March 2015	5	2	0	3	7	7	+0	40.00
(Romania) Universitatea Cluj	29 October 2015	13 April 2016	17	10	5	2	25	7	+18	58.82
(Romania) Pandurii Târgu Jiu	17 July 2017	6 August 2017	1	0	1	0	0	0	+0	0.00
(Romania) Gaz Metan Mediaș	1 July 2018	27 December 2018	23	7	8	8	24	31	−7	30.43
(Romania) FCSB	27 December 2018	21 May 2019	15	9	5	1	27	11	+16	60.00
(Romania) Politehnica Iași	10 June 2019	23 December 2019	24	7	7	10	26	30	−4	29.17
(Romania) Voluntari	9 January 2020	23 December 2020	35	14	6	15	45	48	−3	40.00
(Romania) Gaz Metan Mediaș	1 February 2021	15 September 2021	28	7	7	14	27	32	−5	25.00
(Romania) Botoșani	15 June 2022	10 November 2022	18	5	7	6	15	22	−7	27.78
(Denmark) Vejle	24 September 2024	9 February 2025	8	1	3	4	10	16	−6	12.50
(Romania) Metaloglobus București	14 June 2025	28 February 2026	33	3	7	23	31	71	−40	9.09
Total			238	80	61	97	268	305	−37	33.61
