= Dorin Toma =

Romanian footballer and manager

Personal information
- Date of birth: 4 March 1977 (age 49)
- Place of birth: Șomcuta Mare, Romania
- Height: 1.86 m (6 ft 1 in)
- Position: Defender

Team information
- Current team: CSM Reșița (assistant)

Youth career
- –1995: Maramureş Baia Mare

Senior career*
| Years | Team | Apps | (Gls) |
| 1995–1996 | Maramureş Baia Mare | 3 | (0) |
| 1997–1998 | Dunărea Giurgiu | | |
| 1998–1999 | FC Baia Mare | 2 | (0) |
| 1999–2000 | Baia Sprie | | |
| 2000–2001 | Phoenix Baia Mare | | |
| 2001–2002 | Unirea Dej | | |
| 2002–2009 | CFR Cluj | 90 | (7) |
| 2007–2008 | → Gloria Bistriţa (loan) | 21 | (1) |
| 2009–2010 | FC Baia Mare | 12 | (0) |
| 2010–2013 | FCMU Baia Mare (Note: The statistics for the 2010–11 Divizia C season are unavailable.) | 59 | (0) |
| 2013–2014 | FCM Baia Mare | 29 | (0) |
| Total | | 216 | (8) |

Managerial career
- 2014–2016: FC Baia Mare
- 2016–2017: Viitorul Ulmeni
- 2017–2020: Minaur Baia Mare
- 2021: Politehnica Timișoara
- 2021–2022: SCM Zalău
- 2022–2023: Sticla Arieșul Turda
- 2023–2024: Oțelul Galați (assistant)
- 2025: Sepsi OSK (assistant)
- 2025–2026: Hermannstadt (assistant)
- 2026–: CSM Reșița (assistant)
- * Club domestic league appearances and goals

Dorin Toma (born 4 March 1977) is a former Romanian professional footballer who played as a defender, currently assistant at Liga II club CSM Reșița.

In the summer of 2005, Toma helped CFR Cluj reach the 2005 Intertoto Cup final by scoring one goal in 6 matches in the campaign.

== Honours ==
=== Player ===
Baia Sprie

- Divizia D: 1999–2000

CFR Cluj

- Divizia B: 2003–04
- UEFA Intertoto Cup runner-up: 2005

Gloria Bistrița

- UEFA Intertoto Cup runner-up: 2007

Maramureș Baia Mare

- Liga III: 2010–11

=== Coach ===
FC Baia Mare

- Liga III: 2014–15
