= Stadionul Motorul (Arad) =

Multi-use stadium in Arad, Romania

- Văgăuna (The Ravine)
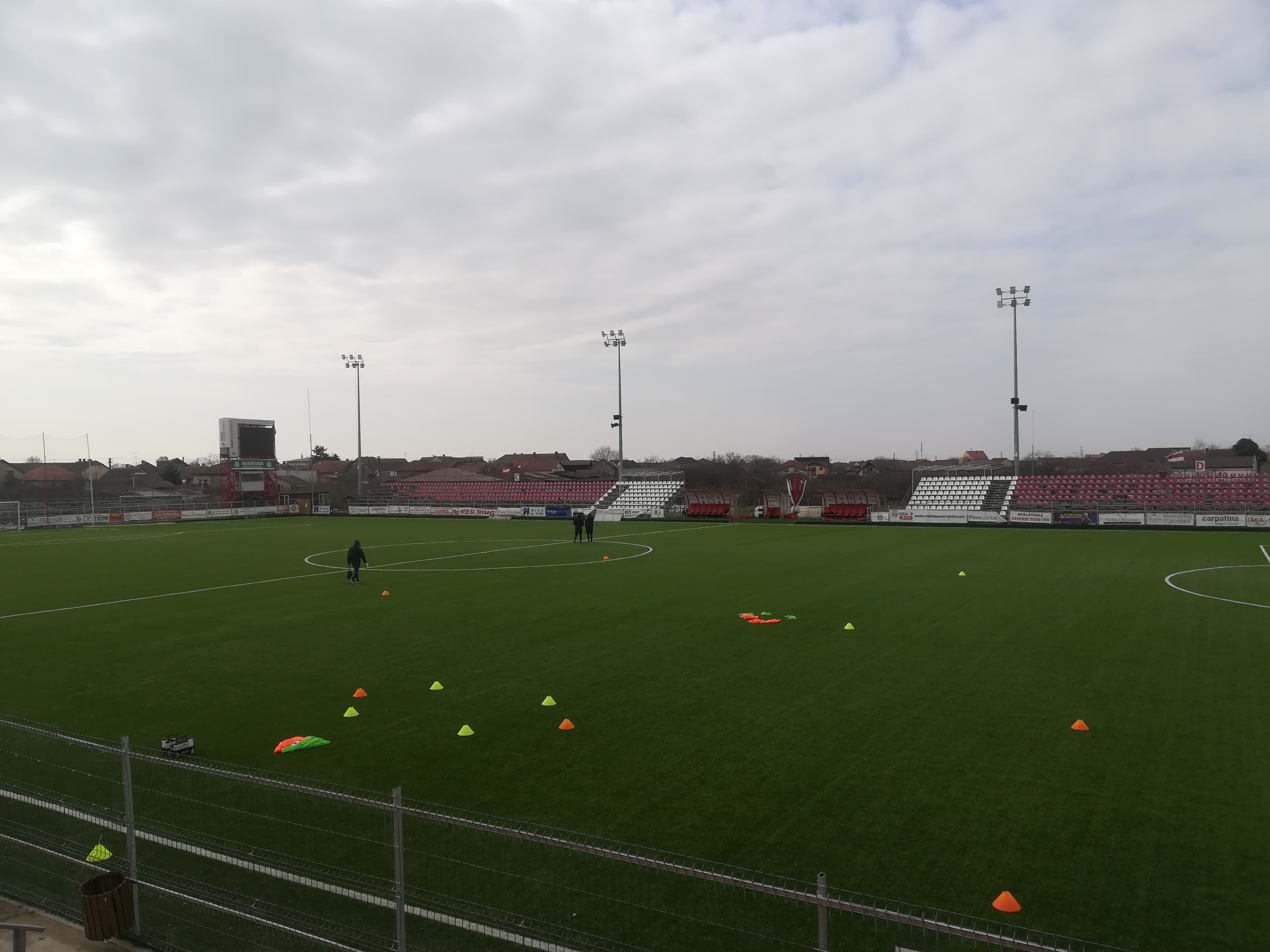
- Interactive map of Stadionul Motorul
- Address: Calea Timișorii, nr. 50 A
- Location: Arad, Romania
- Coordinates: 46°09′08″N 21°19′12″E
- Owner: Arad Municipality
- Operator: UTA Arad
- Capacity: 4,000 seated
- Surface: artificial

Construction
- Renovated: 2006, 2015, 2017–2018

Tenants
- Motorul Arad; ACU Arad (2006–2011); UTA Arad (2014–2020); UTA Academy (2020–present)

Motorul Stadium is a multi-use stadium in Arad, Romania. It is currently used mostly for football matches and is the home ground of UTA Arad Academy. The stadium holds 4000 people, has an electronic scoreboard, a small floodlight for training and also a secondary training pitch behind the west stand. It is located in the Aradul Nou neighbourhood, next to the Caraiman station on the number 3 tram line of the public transport network. Between February 2017 and August 2018 the stadium was under renovation: during this time the old pitch was changed and a new artificial pitch installed, and the capacity of the stadium increased from 2000 to 4000 seats.

== Gallery ==
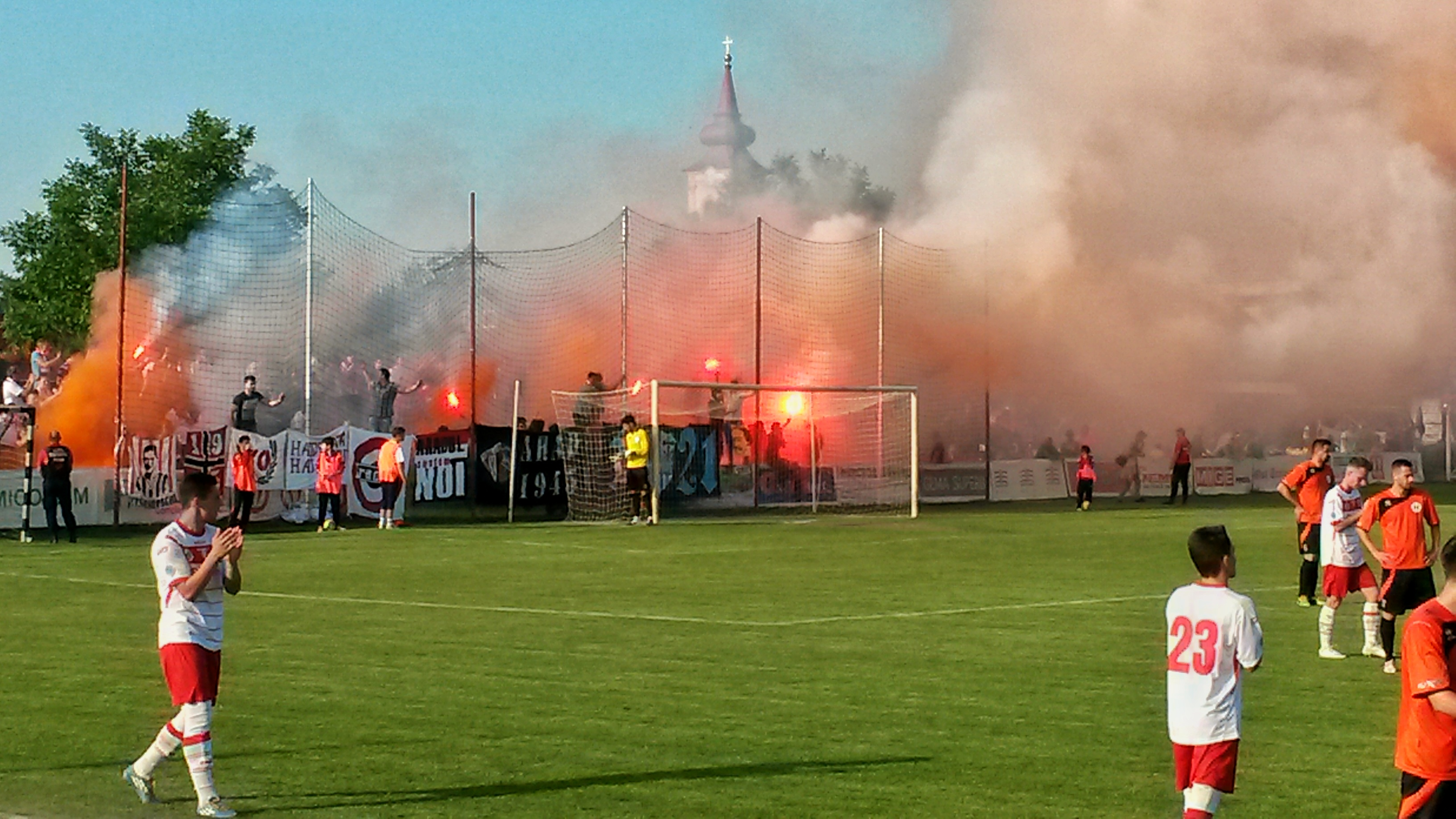
UTA Arad fans on Motorul stadium
