= Marius Popescu =

Romanian footballer and manager

Personal information
- Date of birth: 7 November 1969 (age 57)
- Place of birth: Alba Iulia, Romania
- Height: 1.75 m (5 ft 9 in)
- Positions: Midfielder; forward

Team information
- Current team: Sticla Arieșul Turda (manager)

Youth career
- CSȘ Alba Iulia

Senior career*
Years	Team	Apps	(Gls)
1987–1989	Universitatea Cluj	3	(0)
1989–1990	CFR Cluj		
1990–1998	Universitatea Cluj	176	(37)
1998–1999	Gloria Bistrița	14	(1)
1999	Olimpia Satu Mare	10	(0)
2000–2001	Universitatea Cluj	34	(7)
2002	Apulum Alba Iulia	3	(0)
2002–2004	UTA Arad	56	(7)
2004–2007	Universitatea Cluj	42	(2)
Total		338	(54)

Managerial career
- 2008: Universitatea Cluj
- 2009: Universitatea Cluj
- 2009: Universitatea Cluj
- 2011: Botoșani
- 2012: Universitatea Cluj
- 2012–2013: Universitatea Cluj
- 2015: Universitatea Cluj
- 2016: Sighetu Marmației
- 2016–2017: Universitatea Cluj
- 2017: ASA Târgu Mureș
- 2022–2023: Vitorul Cluj
- 2024–2025: Minaur Baia Mare
- 2025-: Sticla Arieșul Turda
- * Club domestic league appearances and goals as of 08:30, 22 October 2024 (UTC)

Marius Popescu is a Romanian former football player, currently manager. He played almost his entire career for Universitatea Cluj and managed teams like Botoşani and Universitatea Cluj. The last team managed was ASA Târgu Mureș.

== Honours ==
=== Player ===
Universitatea Cluj

- Divizia B: 1991–92, 2006–07
- Divizia C: 2000–01
