= Vanja Radinović =

Serbian football manager and player

Personal information
- Date of birth: 7 September 1972 (age 54)
- Place of birth: Split, SFR Yugoslavia
- Position: Defender

Youth career
- Partizan

Senior career*
Years	Team	Apps	(Gls)
1992–1996	OFK Beograd	60	(0)

Managerial career
- OFK Beograd (youth)
- Partizan (youth)
- 2011–2012: Partizan (assistant)
- 2013: Dalian Professional (assistant)
- 2014–2015: Bežanija
- 2015: Ceahlăul Piatra Neamț
- 2016: Zakynthos
- 2017: Rudar Velenje
- 2018-2024: Partizan (Academy)
- * Club domestic league appearances and goals

Vanja Radinović (Serbian Cyrillic: Вања Радиновић; born 7 September 1972) is a Serbian football manager and former player.

== Playing career ==
After coming through the youth system at Partizan, Radinović played for OFK Beograd between 1992 and 1996.

== Managerial career ==
Between 2011 and 2012, Radinović served as assistant manager to Aleksandar Stanojević and Avram Grant at Partizan.

In April 2015, Radinović was hired as manager of Romanian club Ceahlăul Piatra Neamț, replacing the dismissed Zé Maria.

In January 2017, Radinović took charge of Slovenian club Rudar Velenje.
