= Valentin Sinescu =

Romanian football manager (born 1963)

Personal information
- Date of birth: 16 July 1963 (age 63)
- Place of birth: Ploiești, Romania
- Height: 1.78 m (5 ft 10 in)

Senior career*
Years	Team	Apps	(Gls)
1981−1997	Astra Ploiești		

Managerial career
- 1997−1999: Astra Ploiești (assistant)
- 1999: Astra Ploiești (caretaker)
- 1999−2001: Astra Ploiești (assistant)
- 2001: Al Shoala (assistant)
- 2002: Conpet Ploiești
- 2002: Tricolorul Breaza
- 2003: Carpați Sinaia
- 2003: Petrolistul Boldești
- 2004: Petrolul Teleajen
- 2004: Gomonth Ploiești (futsal)
- 2005−2010: Astra Ploiești (youth)
- 2010−2012: Astra Ploiești (secretary)
- 2012−2013: Astra Giurgiu
- 2013: CSM Câmpina
- 2013−2014: SCM Pitești
- 2014−2015: Oțelul Galați (assistant)
- 2015: Petrolul Ploiești (assistant)
- 2015: Petrolul Ploiești (caretaker)
- 2015: Petrolul Ploiești (assistant)
- 2015: Unirea Dej
- 2015−2016: Sighetu Marmației
- 2016−2018: Romania U16 (assistant)
- 2018−2021: Romania U19 (assistant)
- 2021: Unirea Alba Iulia
- * Club domestic league appearances and goals

Valentin Sinescu (born 16 July 1963) is a Romanian football manager and former footballer. As a footballer, Sinescu played for Astra Ploiești in the lower leagues, during the 1980s and 1990s. In parallel with his football career, Sinescu studied petrochemical engineering and then worked as an engineer at the Ploiești Refinery, hence his nickname, "the engineer".

Since 1997, he started to work as an assistant manager for Astra Ploiești, club for which he was also a caretaker manager, secretary, translator, youth coach and manager in the next 15 years. Sinescu made its debut in the Liga I as a manager in 1999, when for a short period was the caretaker manager of "The Black Devils", then in 2012 he also debuted as a (full) manager in the top-flight, for the same club. Sinescu also worked for teams such as FC Argeș Pitești, Oțelul Galați, Petrolul Ploiești or Unirea Dej, among others.

Valentin Sinescu is well known in the Romanian football for his elevated speech and for the fact that he also speaks several foreign languages fluently. These qualities recommended him for a job as a professor at the Football Managers School of the Romanian Football Federation, but also gave him two new nicknames "the philosopher" or "the professor".
