= Marian Rada =

Romanian footballer and manager

Personal information
- Date of birth: 14 May 1960 (age 66)
- Place of birth: Bucharest, Romania
- Height: 1.84 m (6 ft 0 in)
- Position: Centre back

Senior career*
Years	Team	Apps	(Gls)
1981–1983	Autobuzul București	42	(5)
1983–1986	Rapid București	95	(13)
1986–1987	Universitatea Craiova	37	(3)
1988–1991	Rapid București	33	(0)
Total		207	(21)

International career
1981	Romania U21	1	(0)
1986	Romania	2	(0)

Managerial career
- 1994–2008: Rapid București (assistant)
- 2008: Rapid București
- 2008–2009: Rapid II București
- 2009: Rapid București
- 2009–2010: Rapid București (assistant)
- 2010–2011: Rapid II București
- 2011: Rapid București (caretaker)
- 2011–2012: Rapid București (assistant)
- 2012–2013: Rapid București
- 2013–2014: Rapid București (academy manager)
- 2014: Rapid București
- 2015–2016: ACS Berceni
- 2017–2018: Excel Mouscron (assistant)
- 2019–2020: Rapid București (technical director)
- 2021: Politehnica Iași (technical director)
- 2021: Politehnica Iași (assistant)
- 2021–2023: Hermannstadt (assistant)
- 2024: AFC Câmpulung Muscel (technical director)
- * Club domestic league appearances and goals

Marian Rada (born 14 May 1960) is a Romanian professional football manager and former player.

== Career ==
He started to play in the country's second division (Divizia B) in 1981, for Autobuzul București. After he spent two seasons in Liga II, he was transferred to FC Rapid București, where he found great success. After three years played in top division with Rapid Bucharest, he moved to Universitatea Craiova, where he played only for one season. In 1987, he came back to his soul club – Rapid Bucharest, where he played for another four years, after that he retired.

== Coaching career ==
In 1991, after he retired, he was started a new career, as manager. After three years of preparation, he started as assistant manager at the first team of Rapid Bucharest. After that was followed a long period when he was assistant manager at the first team, manager at the second team, manager on the club academy or even director of the club.

In March 2008, after the resignation of Mircea Rednic, Rada took for the very first time the post of principal manager. He survived in that position 9 rounds, until the end of the season, when he was replaced with Jose Peseiro. The next season, he started as principal manager on the FC Rapid II București, in the third division.

In January 2009, after an unsatisfying first part of the season for the first team, Rada was recalled to the first team. He managed the club together with Adrian Iencsi (which is assistant manager and player in the same time) and Grigore Sichitiu (technical director).

After 15 years on 18 April 2009 has quit Rapid Bucharest after Wednesday's 2–4 defeat against Dinamo Bucharest in the Romanian Cup quarter finals. His place was taken by the former assistant coach Adrian Iencsi.

In October 2012, Rada was reinstalled as the head coach of Rapid. He was sacked at the end of the season.

In September 2014, Rada took again the control of Rapid. His contract was ended by mutual agreement in December 2014.

== Honours ==
=== Player ===
Rapid București

- Divizia B: 1989–90
