= Daniel Isăilă =

Romanian footballer

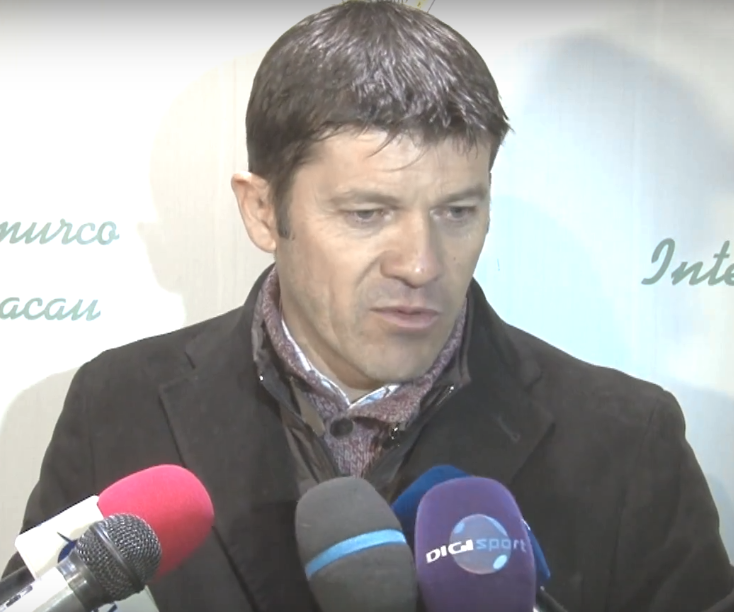
- Isăilă in 2014

Personal information
- Full name: Daniel Ionuț Isăilă
- Date of birth: 29 June 1972 (age 54)
- Place of birth: Brașov, Romania
- Height: 1.85 m (6 ft 1 in)
- Position: Centre back

Team information
- Current team: Baniyas (head coach)

Youth career
- –1992: FC Brașov

Senior career*
Years	Team	Apps	(Gls)
1992–1996	Tractorul Brașov	55	(1)
1997–2000	FC Brașov	89	(3)
1997–1998	→ Tractorul Brașov (loan)	32	(4)
2000	Rapid București	9	(0)
2001–2006	FC Brașov	107	(5)
Total		292	(13)

Managerial career
- 2006–2007: FC Săcele
- 2007–2010: FC Brașov (assistant)
- 2010: FC Brașov
- 2010–2011: FC Brașov (assistant)
- 2011: FC Brașov
- 2011–2012: Sportul Studențesc
- 2012–2013: FCM Târgu Mureș
- 2013–2014: Astra Giurgiu
- 2014: Astra Giurgiu
- 2014–2016: Romania (assistant)
- 2016–2018: Romania U21
- 2018–2020: Al-Hazem
- 2020–2023: Baniyas
- 2023–2024: Ajman
- 2024: Khor Fakkan
- 2025: Baniyas
- 2025–: Baniyas
- * Club domestic league appearances and goals

Daniel Ionuț Isăilă (born 29 June 1972) is a Romanian professional football manager and former player. He is the current head coach of UAE Pro League club Baniyas.

A former defender, Isăilă played 149 matches in Liga I, scoring seven goals. He played eight times in the UEFA Cup, four games each with Rapid București and FC Brașov.

== Coaching career ==
He began his coaching career in 2006 at second league club FC Săcele. He then joined the technical staff of Răzvan Lucescu, becoming his assistant at FC Brașov.

From July 2010 he was in numerous occasions the head coach of FC Brașov, overseen by technical director Daniel Oprea, Isăilă not having the PRO License coach certificate yet.

In November 2011, Isăilă signed a contract for four seasons with Sportul Studențesc. The club relegated under his command. In August 2012, he moved to second division club FCM Târgu Mureș, where he received a contract for a season with the main objective being promotion in Liga I. He resigned in the middle of the season, because the team was far from reaching the target, being only 5th after 16 games.

In April 2013, he was appointed head coach of Liga I side Astra Giurgiu. With Astra Giurgiu he had fantastic performances and in two years he won almost everything possible. In his first season in charge, he won the Cupa României at the National Arena Stadium against Steaua Bucharest in front of 53,000 Steaua supporters. On 11 July he won the second historical cup for Astra, the Supercup, again against Steaua Bucharest. After the best performance of Astra Giurgiu in the Championship, (2nd place) he qualified his team in the Europa League group stages for the first time, winning against Lyon in a fantastic double match which will remain in the history of the club. In October 2014, he stepped down as manager of Astra. In October the same year, he became one of the assistant coaches for the Romania national team working under Anghel Iordănescu and later Christoph Daum.

In December 2016, Isăilă was named as the head coach of Romania under-21 national team. After nearly two years in control he gave up the national team, thus leaving it with chances of qualifying to the 2019 UEFA European Under-21 Championship.

In June 2018, he signed with newly promoted Saudi Professional League side Al-Hazem. He was sacked on 31 January 2020 following a 0–0 draw with Al-Taawoun.

Isăilă later managed UAE Pro League clubs Baniyas, Ajman and Khor Fakkan, before returning to Baniyas for two separate tenures.

== Coaching stats ==
As of 7 February 2026

Team	From	To	Record						
Team	From	To	G	W	D	L	GF	GA	Win %
(Romania) FC Săcele	1 July 2006	30 June 2007	34	11	10	13	34	43	32.35
(Romania) FC Braşov	9 July 2010	17 December 2010	21	7	8	6	20	23	33.33
(Romania) FC Braşov	31 August 2011	1 November 2011	9	2	3	4	9	10	22.22
(Romania) Sportul Studenţesc	3 November 2011	22 August 2012	22	5	6	11	22	34	22.73
(Romania) FCM Târgu Mureș	24 August 2012	11 March 2013	17	9	2	6	20	17	52.94
(Romania) Astra Giurgiu	14 April 2013	22 March 2014	45	25	13	7	87	44	55.56
(Romania) Astra Giurgiu	8 May 2014	10 October 2014	23	15	1	7	55	31	65.22
Romania U21	13 December 2016	8 June 2018	8	2	3	3	9	12	25.00
(Saudi Arabia) Al-Hazem	8 June 2018	31 January 2020	49	13	14	22	57	82	26.53
(United Arab Emirates) Baniyas	27 June 2020	1 June 2023	113	40	27	46	158	167	35.40
(United Arab Emirates) Ajman	3 October 2023	1 June 2024	23	8	9	6	31	31	34.78
(United Arab Emirates) Khor Fakkan	25 June 2024	6 November 2024	10	2	1	7	12	22	20.00
(United Arab Emirates) Baniyas	9 January 2025	27 May 2025	13	5	3	5	13	17	38.46
(United Arab Emirates) Baniyas	20 September 2025	present	12	4	2	6	15	19	33.33
Total			399	148	102	149	542	552	37.09

== Honours ==
=== Player ===
FC Brașov

- Divizia B: 1998–99

=== Coach ===
Astra Giurgiu

- Cupa României: 2013–14
- Supercupa României: 2014
