= Adrian Szabo =

Roman footballer and manager

Personal information
- Date of birth: 17 June 1960 (age 66)
- Place of birth: Brașov, Romania
- Position: Midfielder

Team information
- Current team: Corona Brașov (sporting director)

Youth career
- 1970–1978: Steagul Roșu Brașov

Senior career*
| Years | Team | Apps | (Gls) |
| 1978–1980 | Steagul Roșu Brașov | | |
| 1980–1986 | ICIM Brașov | | |
| 1986–1988 | Precizia Săcele | | |

Managerial career
- 1992–1994: Precizia Săcele
- 1994–1995: ICIM Brașov
- 1995–1996: Shahrdari Tabriz
- 1996–1997: Machine Sazi
- 1998–2012: Brașov B
- 2012: Brașov
- 2012–2013: Brașov
- 2014: Brașov
- 2015: Brașov
- 2015: Brașov
- 2016: Brașov
- 2016–2019: Corona Brașov (youth)
- 2019–2021: Corona Brașov (sporting director)
- 2021–2023: FC Brașov (Assistant)
- 2023–: Kids Tâmpa Brașov (Assistant)
- * Club domestic league appearances and goals

Adrian Szabo (born 17 June 1960 in Brașov) is a Romanian football manager and former footballer.
