= CSM Ceahlăul Piatra Neamț =

Romanian association football club

Ceahlăul Piatra Neamț
- Full name: Club Sportiv Municipal; Ceahlăul Piatra Neamț
- Nicknames: Nemțenii (The People from Neamț County); Urșii carpatini (The Carpathian Bears); Echipa de sub Pietricica (The Team Below Pietricica Mountain); Galben-negrii (The Yellow and Blacks)
- Founded: 20 October 1919; 107 years ago; 17 August 2016; 10 years ago (refounding)
- Ground: Ceahlăul
- Capacity: 18,000
- Owners: Anton Măzărianu; Piatra Neamț Municipality
- Chairman: vacant
- Head coach: Vasile Avădanei
- League: Liga III
- 2025–26: Liga II; Regular season: 18th of 22; Play-out, Group A: 7th (relegated)
- Website: csmceahlaul.ro
| Home colours | Away colours |

Club Sportiv Municipal Ceahlăul Piatra Neamț, commonly known as Ceahlăul Piatra Neamț (Romanian: [tʃe̯ahˈlə.ul ˈpjatra ˈne̯amts]) or simply as Ceahlăul, is a Romanian football club based in Piatra Neamț, Neamț County, currently playing in the Liga III.

Originally established in 1919, it competed in much of its history in the second and third divisions, making its first appearance in the Romanian top flight in the 1993–94 season, achieving its best finish of 4th place in 1999–2000. Ceahlăul went on to spend eighteen seasons in the highest tier of Romanian football before its relegation in 2015.

Following exclusion from Liga II and subsequent dissolution in the spring of 2016, the club was refounded the following summer and entered Liga V Neamț County, the fifth tier of the Romanian football league system, earning promotion after one season to Liga IV Neamț County. After further promotion in 2018, it spent five consecutive seasons in Liga III, returning to Liga II in 2023 before being relegated back to the third tier in 2026 after three seasons in the second tier.

The club plays its home matches in black and yellow kits at the 18,000-seater Ceahlăul Stadium, traditionally known as “Borzoghean”, located on a historic plateau carved by a nearby brook, where local authorities decided in 1935 to construct what was then a modern sports arena.

== History ==
=== Early years (1919–1961) ===
Ceahlăul Piatra Neamț was founded on 20 October 1919 in the amphitheatre of Petru Rareș High School in Piatra Neamț, named after the nearby Ceahlău Massif, and the adopted colours were black, inspired by the beret worn by the students, and yellow. The squad, initially formed of high-school players, was strengthened by soldiers from the 15th Infantry Regiment who had returned from World War I. The team competed in the Moldova Regional Championship, which it won in 1926. In 1927, most of the club's players left to attend university and Ceahlăul entered a period of decline. The club played in Divizia C during the 1937–38 season, but withdrew from the league due to financial problems.

Ceahlăul was revived in 1947 with a squad that included Vulovici, Bălănescu, Ciciuc (Popovici), Actis, Manoliu, Dăscălescu, Vasiliu, Georgescu, Mata, Butnaru and Chiper. Beginning in 1949, the club went through a period of instability marked by frequent changes to its name, structure and squad. The team was renamed Progresul Piatra Neamț, before becoming Avântul Piatra Neamț in 1951.

In 1956, Avântul merged with the other two clubs from the city, Hârtia and Celuloza, forming Recolta Piatra Neamț. Recolta played one season in the newly re-established Divizia C, finishing 11th and relegating to the regional championship. At the end of the season, Recolta split into two clubs, Avântul and Rapid, but after a poor campaign the sides merged again in 1958 under the name Club Sportiv Piatra Neamț.

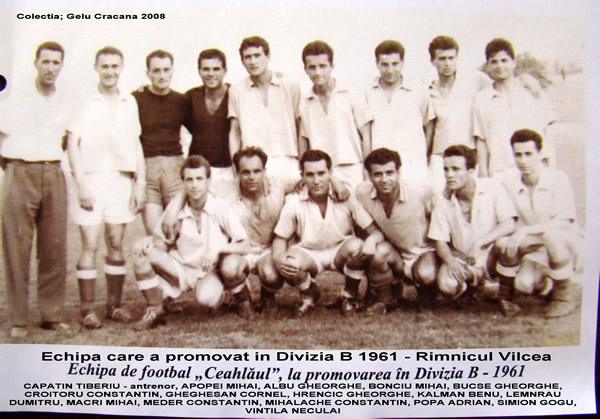
The 1960–61 squad

CS Piatra Neamț competed in the 1958–59 Divizia C season, finishing 3rd in Series I and qualifying for the promotion play-off, where it finished last in the group played in Arad behind Dinamo Miliție București and Metalul Târgoviște, before returning to the Bacău Regional Championship after Divizia C was dissolved.

In 1960, the club reverted to the name Ceahlăul and, coached by Tiberiu Căpățînă, won the 1960–61 Bacău Regional Championship, securing promotion to Divizia B for the first time in the club's history after finishing 2nd in Series I of the promotion play-off held in Râmnicu Vâlcea. The squad included Apopei, Albu, Bonciu, Bucșe, Croitoru, Ghegheșan, Hrencic, Kalman, Lemnrău, Macri, Meder, Mihalache, Popa, Simion and Neculai.

=== Three decades in the second league (1961–1993) ===
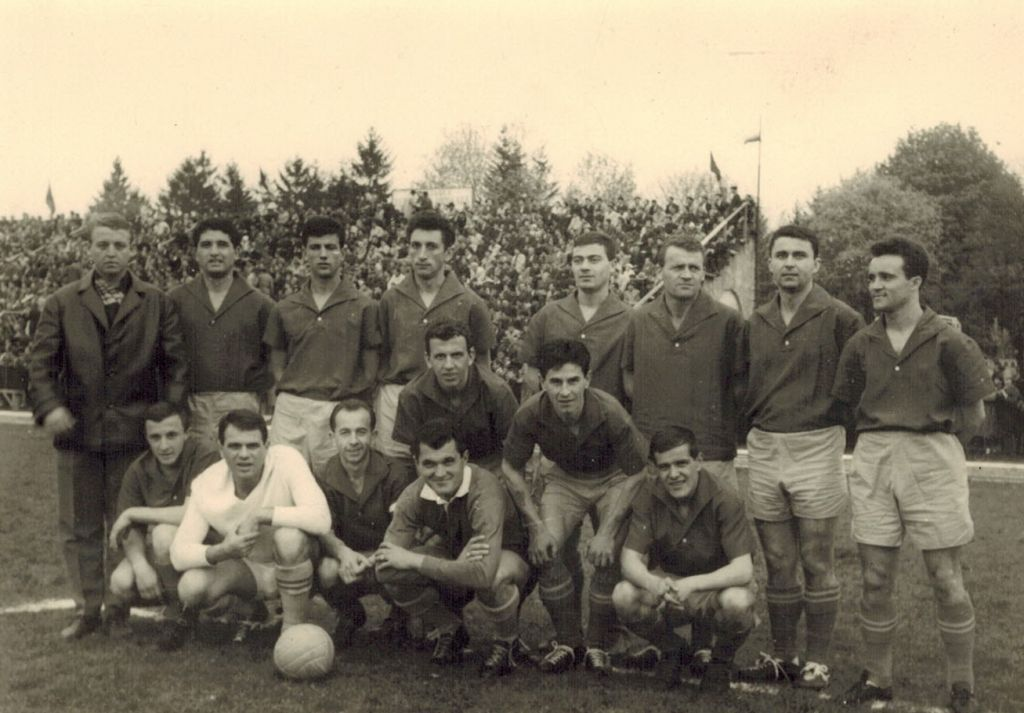
The 1964–65 squad

Ceahlăul Piatra Neamț played three consecutive seasons in Divizia B, finishing 8th in 1961–62, 10th in 1962–63 with Ștefan Wetzer on the bench and 13th in 1963–64 under Ștefan Coidum. Relegated to Divizia C, Ceahlăul was promoted back after one season; the club finished first, four points ahead of second-place Textila Buhuși.

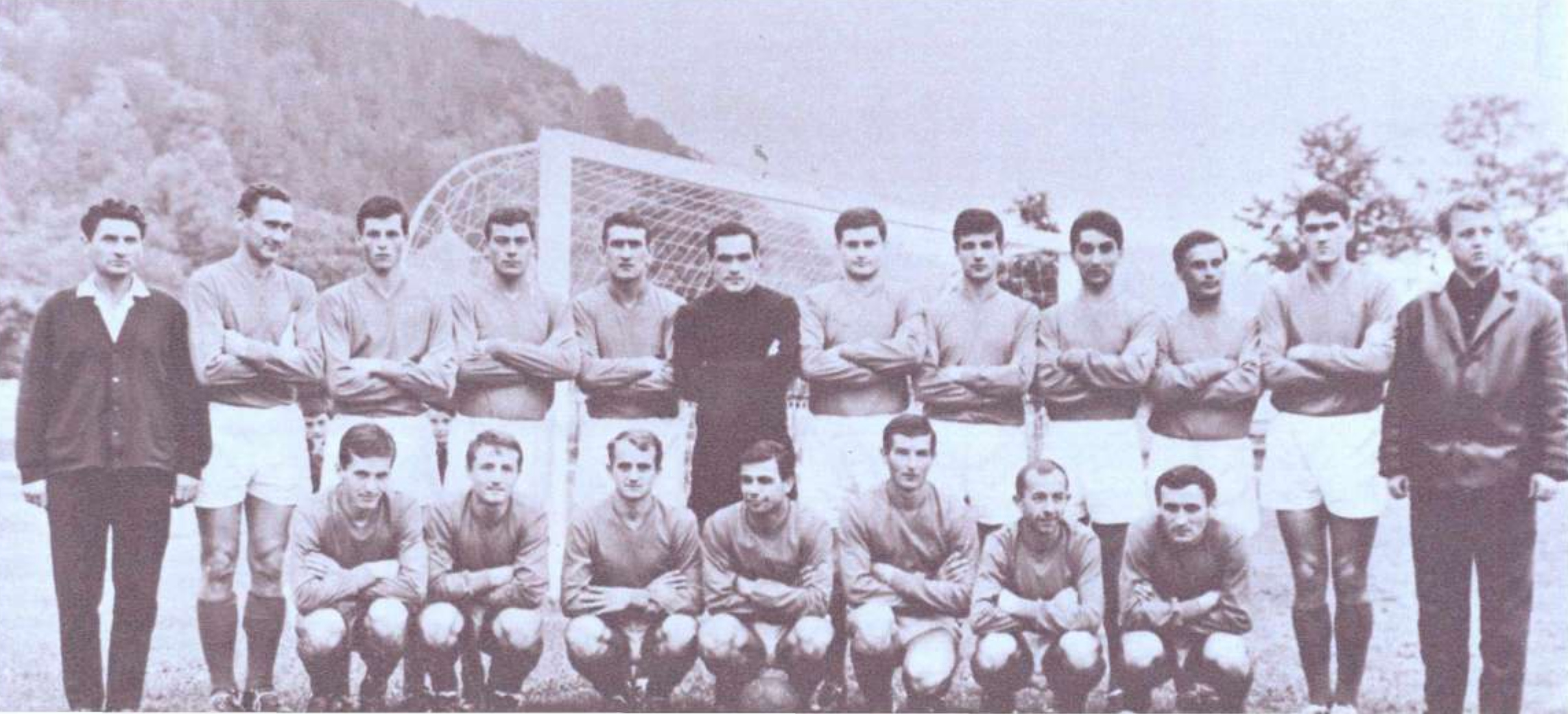
Ceahlăul squad in 1967

The following years, the Team Below Pietricica Mountain competed in Series I of Divizia B, finishing 7th in 1965–66, 9th in 1966–67, and 5th in both the 1967–68 and 1968–69 seasons under coach Petre Steinbach. After Steinbach's departure, the team finished 12th in 1969–70, with Mircea Crețu coaching during the first half of the season and Virgil Rizea during the second, followed by 8th in 1970–71, 10th in 1971–72, 13th in 1972–73 and 6th in 1973–74. Coached by Alexandru Constantinescu, Ceahlăul finished 4th in 1974–75, one point behind 3rd-place Gloria Buzău and four points behind 2nd-place Progresul Brăila. The team subsequently finished 13th in 1975–76, 10th in 1976–77 and 12th in 1977–78.

In 1978, Ceahlăul merged with Relonul Săvinești, the team of the synthetic yarn and fibre plant Relon, located on the Săvinești industrial platform near Piatra Neamț, and was renamed Relon Ceahlăul Piatra Neamț. However, the team finished 15th at the end of the 1978–79 season and was relegated on goal difference after being tied on points with four other teams, in a tightly contested league table in which only six points separated 4th-place Constanța from 17th-place Victoria Tecuci, which brought an end to Ceahlăul's fourteen-year spell in the second tier.

The club changed its name back to Ceahlăul Piatra Neamț during the summer of 1979. Ceahlăul finished first, seven points ahead of second-place Foresta Fălticeni, and was promoted back to the second league after one season in Divizia C.

Coached by Dumitru Dumitriu, the team finished 9th in 1980–81, 10th in 1981–82 and 7th in 1982–83. Dumitriu was replaced by Vasile Copil in 1983, and the team finished 4th (a club record at the time) in 1983–84. Ceahlăul finished 11th in 1984–85 and 1985–86, 8th in 1986–87, 9th in 1987–88 and 11th in 1988–89. The team finished 14th in 1989–90 during the Romanian Revolution, just avoiding relegation.

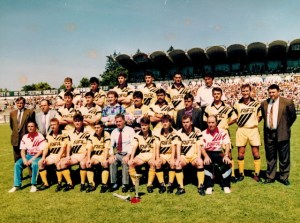
The 1992–93 team, which was promoted to Divizia A for the first time in club history

The 1989 revolution was the beginning of the end for teams such as Victoria București, Flacăra Moreni and Olt Scornicești, but was a restart for Ceahlăul. Long a mediocre Divizia B team, the yellow-and-blacks finished third in 1990–91 (three points out of second) and 1991–92 (three points behind second-place FC Baia Mare and 10 points ahead of Metrom Brașov.

The 1992–93 squad

Ioan Sdrobiș ("The Father"), a coach known for promoting young players, was hired as manager during the summer of 1992. Gheorghe Ștefan became the club president, and FC Argeș, ASA Târgu Mureș, Gloria Buzău and Politehnica Iași were rivals for promotion. Two teams were related to the former political regime: Steaua Mizil (a Steaua București satellite team) and Flacăra Moreni. During the winter break, Sdrobiș left the team in first place after disputes with Ștefan and signed with Dacia Unirea Brăila. He was replaced by former Dinamo București and Fenerbahçe player Ion Nunweiller.

The yellow-and-blacks were promoted to Divizia A for the first time in club history with 20 victories, seven draws, seven losses, 54 goals scored and 24 conceded for 47 points, six points ahead of Steaua Mizil, FC Argeș and Flacăra Moreni. The team consisted of coaches Sdrobiș (matches 1–17) and Nunweiller (matches 18–34) and players Anghelinei, Șoiman, Axinia I, Axinia II, Dinu, Alexa, Cozma, Gălan, Coșerariu, Enache, Bârcă, Ghioane, Grosu, Ivanov, Gigi Ion, Ionescu, Lefter, Ov. Marc, Mirea, Nichifor, Pantazi, Săvinoiu, Șoimaru, Urzică, Buliga, Oprea, Breniuc, Apachiței and Vrânceanu; the administrative leadership was ensured by: Gheorghe Ștefan, Gh. Chivorchian, Iulian Țocu, Liviu Tudor, Ioan Strătilă and Luigi Bodo.

For six months in 1993, it was known as Ceahlăul Simpex for sponsorship reason. Contributions to the team during this period were also made by I. Iovicin, M. Crețu, Radu Toma, V. Rizea, Tr. Coman, N. Zaharia, T. Anghelini, Toader Șteț, M. Nedelcu, M. Radu and Fl. Hizo (coaches) and C. Acatincăi, Gh. Ocneanu, D. Lospa and M. Contardo (presidents).

=== Golden age (1993–2004) ===
At the start of the 1993–94 Divizia A season, Ceahlăul was a well-known second-league team but largely unknown to most of Romania's first-division teams. With former player Mircea Nedelcu as the new coach, the team finished halfway down the table in 10th place. It finished fifth at the end of the 1994–95 season and qualified for a European Cup.

The club played in the 1995 UEFA Intertoto Cup, winning a group consisting of FC Groningen, Beveren, Boby Brno and Etar Veliko Tarnovo (2–0 against Etar, 2–0 against Beveren, 2–0 against Brno and 0–0 against Groningen). In the round of 16, the nemțenii lost to FC Metz of France 0–2, with goals scored by Jocelyn Blanchard and Franck Meyrignac. The club did less well during the regular season, finishing 15th (six points from the relegation zone).

Under coach Florin Marin, the yellow-and-blacks revived in the 1996–97 season to finish sixth. Florin Marin, Mircea Nedelcu, Nicolae Manea and Viorel Hizo coached the team to two consecutive ninth-place finishes in 1997–98 and 1998–99. Ceahlăul prepared for the 1999 UEFA Intertoto Cup, eliminating two teams: Ekranas (2–0 on aggregate) and Jedinstvo Bihać (5–2 on aggregate). In the third round, Ceahlăul played two home-and-away matches against Juventus. The team drew 1–1 at Piatra Neamț, with goals by Scânteie in the 28th minute and Alessio Tacchinardi in the 58th. In Italy, at Dino Manuzzi Stadium in Cesena, they played a scoreless draw and were eliminated. Ceahlăul finished fourth in Divizia A for the best performance in club history. Coached by Viorel Hizo, its players were Eugen Anghel, Costel Câmpeanu, Radu Lefter – Angelo Alistar, Cristinel Atomulesei, Adrian Baldovin, Dumitru Botez, Codruț Domșa, Costel Enache, Leontin Grozavu, Constantin Ilie, Mihai Dan Ionescu, Ovidiu Marc, Mihai Nemțanu, Gheorghe Pantazi, Dănuț Perjă, Daniel Scînteie, Adrian Solomon, Tiberiu Șerban, Tudorel Șoimaru and Lavi Hrib.

The 1999–2000 squad

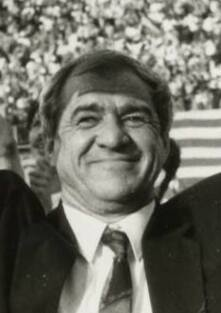
Coach Viorel Hizo, who obtained Ceahlăul's best results

In 2000, Ceahlăul again played in the UEFA Intertoto Cup. After a 9–4 aggregate score against Estonia's Narva Trans in the first round, the team defeated Spain's Mallorca 4–3. In the third round, the nemțenii drew 2–2 in Piatra Neamț against Austria Wien before losing 0–3 at Franz Horr Stadium in Wien with goals scored by Wagner, Leitner and Dospel.

During the early 2000s, coaching changes (11 in four years, including from Mircea Nedelcu to Florin Halagian and from Florin Marin to Marin Barbu, Viorel Hizo and Marius Lăcătuș) led to poor results: 11th place in 2000–01, eighth in 2001–02, and 14th in 2003–04. Ceahlăul was relegated in 2004 after 11 years and 10 seasons in the first league, with Hizo coaching the first half and Lăcătuș the second half. The team finished fifth in 2002–03 and again played in the UEFA Intertoto Cup, eliminated in the first round by Tampere United of Finland.

Club president Gheorghe Ștefan (nicknamed "Pinalti" because of his demands for a penalty in Moldavian) was accused of conspiring with Jean "Tata Jean" Pădureanu (the Gloria Bistrița president), father of the "Football Cooperative": a group of teams known for match-fixing in the 1990s. In addition to Ceahlăul, teams such as Gloria Bistrița, FC Brașov, Steaua București and Dinamo București were involved. Despite the lack of an official investigation, statements by players, coaches, and presidents and eyewitness reports attest to strange matches during the period. "Reciprocities" included sharing points to win a championship, qualifying for the European Cups or avoiding relegation. Pressure on referees gave the city (and Ceahlăul) the nickname "Kosovo". Another incident during "Ștefan's era" at Piatra Neamț occurred in 2000, before the first match of the third round of the UEFA Intertoto Cup against Austria Wien, when the president tried to offer prostitutes to the match referees; the club was suspended for a year from UEFA competitions, but "Pinalti" said that the girls were members of a folk ensemble. The first signs of the "Football Cooperative" were noted in 1993, when it was suspected that Ceahlăul offered suitcases with money for teams in the first series to pull hard against opponents or ease up as desired. Gelu Crăcană, a passionate supporter of the team and a member of its entourage, said in 2016: "Mergeam cu genţi cu bani în majoritatea deplasărilor. Am mai cărat şi eu genţile, ţin minte că am purtat banii la mine când am mers la Autobuzul București" ("We went with money bags in most of the trips. I've also carried these bags; I remember that I took the money with me when we went to Autobuzul București"). Iulian Țocu, a director of the club at that time, described how many matches had been fixed that season.

=== ABBA period (2004–2016) ===
Ceahlăul logo between 2006 and 2016

During this time, Ceahlăul was known as an "ABBA team" (a nickname used in Romania for clubs that used to alternate the presences between the first and the second league). After relegation, Florin Marin was hired as the new coach. Although the squad kept most of its players, Ceahlăul finished in fifth place – 18 points from the promotion place (occupied by FC Vaslui) and 22 from the first relegation place, occupied by FC Ghimbav. Marin Barbu replaced Marin the following season; the team was promoted, seven points ahead of second-place Forex Brașov and eight points ahead of FC Brașov.

The club changed its logo, replacing the black goat against the Ceahlău Massif background with a Carpathian bear; orange became the primary color, and the team was nicknamed "Urșii carpatini" ("The Carpathian Bears").

With many managerial changes and uninspired play, Ceahlăul finished the 2006–07 Liga I season in 15th place and was relegated. During the summer of 2007, however, Delta Tulcea (second place in Liga II) could not obtain a license for the upcoming Liga I season and Ceahlăul was accepted in its place. Coached by Hizo, the club was relegated after again finishing in 15th place.

With Marin again at the helm of a new generation which included players such as Andrei Vițelaru, Alexandru Forminte, Alexandru Ichim, Daniel Barna, Andrei Țepeș, Vlad Achim, Eugeniu Cebotaru, Vlad Achim, Ionuț Bădescu or Cristinel Gafița, Ceahlăul was promoted back to Liga I with 69 points (22 victories, three draws, five losses, 52 goals scored and 17 allowed. Second-place CSM Ploiești, two points behind, was also promoted.

The Carpathian Bears were relegated for the third time in six years, finishing 17th out of 18 with 28 points in 34 matches. The club began the season with Florin Marin, continued with Gheorghe Mulțescu, and ended with ex-Benfica player Zoran Filipović.

The 2010–2011 squad

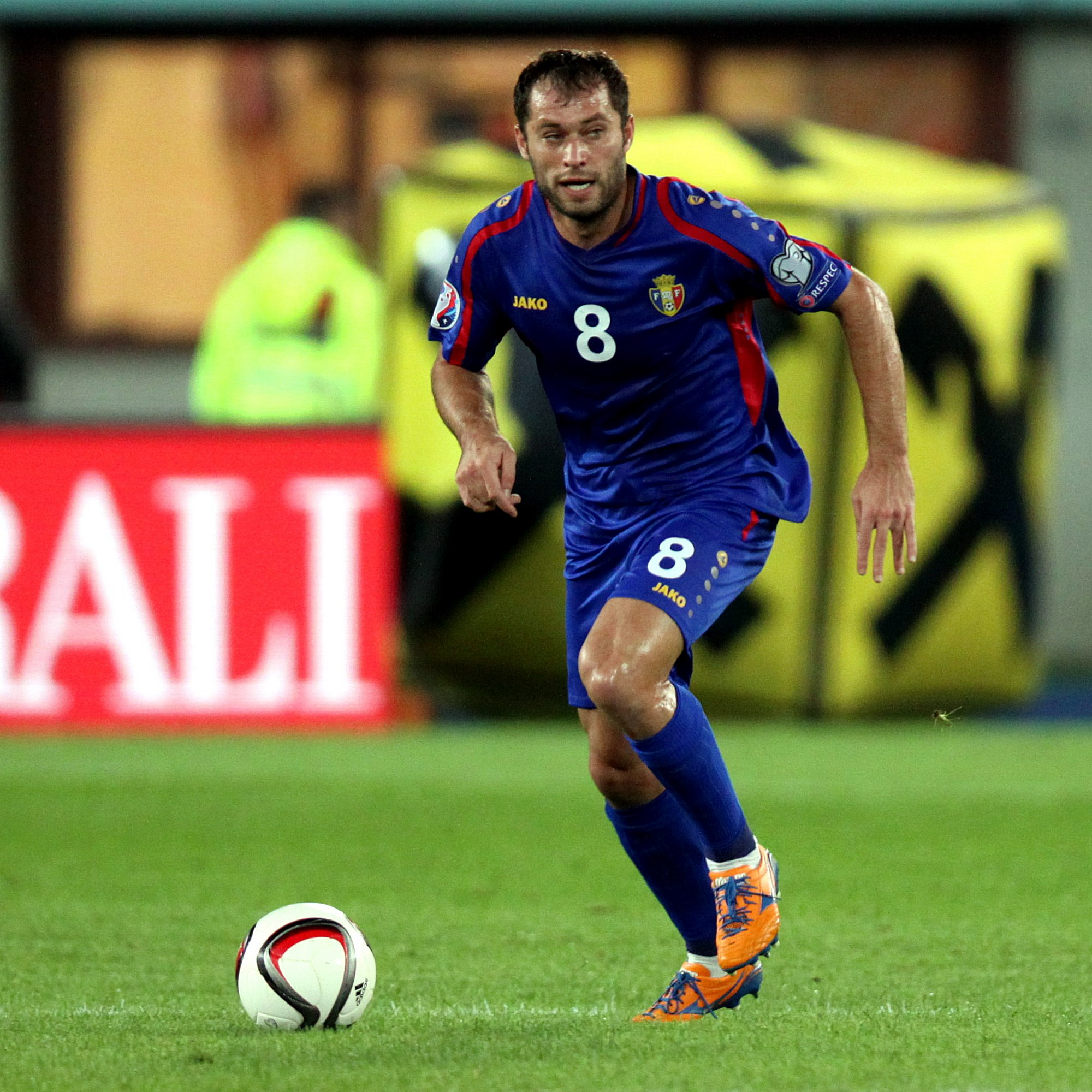
Eugeniu Cebotaru played in 136 matches and scored 32 goals for Ceahlăul between 2006 and 2011, and was captain of the 2011 promotion squad.

Ceahlăul was again promoted at the end of the 2010–11 Liga II season, this time with Marin Barbu as coach. The squad included Andrei Dumitraș, Andrei Marc and Sebastian Chitoșcă. Due to its good financial situation, excellent training conditions, a combination of youth and experience and talented coaches such as Costel Enache, Vasile Miriuță and Constantin Ilie, Ceahlăul remained in the first league for four years and finished 11th in 2011–12, 14th in 2012–13, ninth in 2013–14 and 18th in 2014–15.

In 2014, the club began drowning in debt. Ștefan, who was the mayor of Piatra Neamț between 2004 and 2014, began to have legal problems and was arrested. Without his or the municipality's help, 55 percent of the club's shares were sold to Italian businessman Angelo Massone in December of that year. Massone brought a number of players from the lower Italian and Spanish leagues, and hired coaches such as Zé Maria and Vanja Radinović to no avail.

Returned to the Liga II, without money from TV rights, without the help of the municipality and with an owner who did not seem to invest in the team, the media called the club as "Massone's Camp". With uncertain finances, unpaid players, six coaches changed in a season and a policy of transfers from the lower Italian and Spanish leagues, Ceahlăul ended the regular season in 12th place and barely avoided relegation. The club withdrew from the championship with a few matches before the end of the play-out round and was relegated to the county leagues. Its financial problems were unmanageable, and the club began dissolution in the spring of 2016.

=== New beginning (2016 – present) ===
On 22 July 2016, the media reported that the club would be re-founded as CSM Ceahlăul Piatra Neamț. Its founders were Mihai Bătrânu and Cătălin Roca, owners of former team sponsors Moldocor and Ro Com Central Companies. The RIFIL Company, another sponsor represented by Luigi Bodo and Ioan Strătilă, has indicated support for the new team. On 17 August of that year, the new club was legally registered.

Its logo was also changed, the black goat and Ceahlău Massif returning to the foreground in a restyled form, and the club colors returned to the original yellow and black. The team was enrolled in Liga V Neamț, the second at county level and fifth in the Romanian football league system, and Toader Șteț was appointed as head coach. The squad was composed mainly of players developed at the Ceahlăul Football Academy, and after one season the team, which comprised, among others, Chelaru, Chiruță, Rusu, Smău, Albu, C. Rotaru, Pintilie, Copoț-Barb, Vasile, Apostol, Ungureanu, Lupei, Butunoi, Zaharia, Mateiciuc and Șimon, was promoted to Liga IV Neamț following a 1st-place finish in Series II, 13 points ahead of 2nd-place Olimpia Grințieș, with 16 victories, no draws or losses, 136 goals scored and five conceded, for a total of 48 points.

In the 2017–18 season of Liga IV Neamț, strengthened with some new players such as Câmpeanu, V. Rotaru or Nedelcu, entered the winter break in first place, after which Toader Șteț was replaced by Gabriel Rădulescu, who guided Ceahlăul to the county title and promotion to Liga III without a play-off, as Victoria Lețcani, the Iași County winners, were ineligible for promotion.

In Liga III, Ceahlăul competed in Series I and, under Gabriel Rădulescu, finished in 10th place in the 2018–19 season. In August 2019, Ștefan Stoica was appointed as the new head coach for the 2019–20 campaign, leading the Team Below Pietricica Mountain to 3rd place before the season was curtailed due to the COVID-19 pandemic. Rădulescu returned to Ceahlăul, leading the team to another 3rd-place finish in the 2020–21 season.

In 2021, Constantin Ilie was appointed as the new head coach for the 2021–22 campaign, with the aim of securing promotion, but poor results led to his dismissal after six rounds, being replaced by Gabriel Rădulescu. In January 2022, Florentin Petre took charge and led the team to a 5th-place finish in the regular season, one point behind Bucovina Rădăuți and Hușana Huși, missing qualification for the series play-off, while remaining in the same position at the end of the series play-out stage.

In the 2022–23 season, Florentin Petre was replaced in November 2022, after eleven rounds, by Cristian Pustai, who led the team to a 3rd-place finish in the regular season and 2nd in the play-off series, qualifying for the promotion play-offs. Ceahlăul defeated Metalul Buzău in the semi-finals (1–1 at home and 2–1 away) and Foresta Suceava in the final (0–0 away at Suceava and 2–0 at home), returning to Liga II after seven years of absence. The squad included, among others, Krell, Barna, Moroșanu, Forizs, Vișinar (c), Lăcustă, Acasandrei, Apetrei, Ștefănescu, Akwasi, Petra, Anton, Neicuțescu, P. Petre, Copoț-Barb, Cătău, Nemțanu, Pîntea, Ahmed Mubarak and R. Ciobanu.

Ceahlăul managed to reach the play-off round of the Cupa României, where it lost 2–4 to top-flight side Universitatea Cluj. In the 2023–24 Liga II season, the team led by Cristian Pustai narrowly missed the top-six promotion play-off group, finishing 7th in the regular season, one point behind Csíkszereda Miercurea Ciuc, before ending the campaign 2nd in Group A of the play-out stage.

Pustai left the club in the summer of 2024 and was replaced by Italian coach Marco Veronese, who led Ceahlăul to the group stage of the Cupa României, where the team finished 5th with one point from matches against Afumați (0–0), CFR Cluj (1–2) and Botoșani (0–1), and in the 2024–25 Liga II campaign, Ceahlăul finished 8th in the regular season and 2nd in Group B of the play-out stage.

In the 2025–26 campaign, Veronese was dismissed after a heavy 0–8 defeat against Concordia Chiajna in the third round and was replaced by assistant coach Vasile Avădanei as interim, who also led the team in the play-off round of Cupa României, where Ceahlăul lost 0–4 to Metalul Buzău. Cristian Pustai returned to Ceahlăul in late September, leading the team until round seventeen before resigning during the winter break. Subsequently, Avădanei led the team to an 18th-place finish in the regular season, while Ceahlăul was mathematically relegated one round before the end of the campaign and ultimately finished 7th in Group A of the play-out stage.

== Youth program ==
Youth academy of Ceahlăul Piatra Neamț is located in Moldavia. Alumni include players such as: Vasile Avădanei, Florin Axinia, Mihai Bordeianu, Lucian Burdujan, Robert Căruță, Gelu Chertic, Lidi Chertic Sebastian Chitoșcă, Lucian Covrig, Marian Drăghiceanu, Costel Enache, Alexandru Forminte, Alexandru Ichim, Constantin Ilie, Mihai Dan Ionescu, Andrei Marc, Florin Nohai, Doru Popadiuc, Gabriel Rădulescu, Adrian Solomon, Tudor Șoimaru, Andrei Țepeș or Andrei Vițelaru. Among the talent scouts in Ceahlăul Football Academy were professors Radu Toma and Mihai Radu.

== Grounds ==
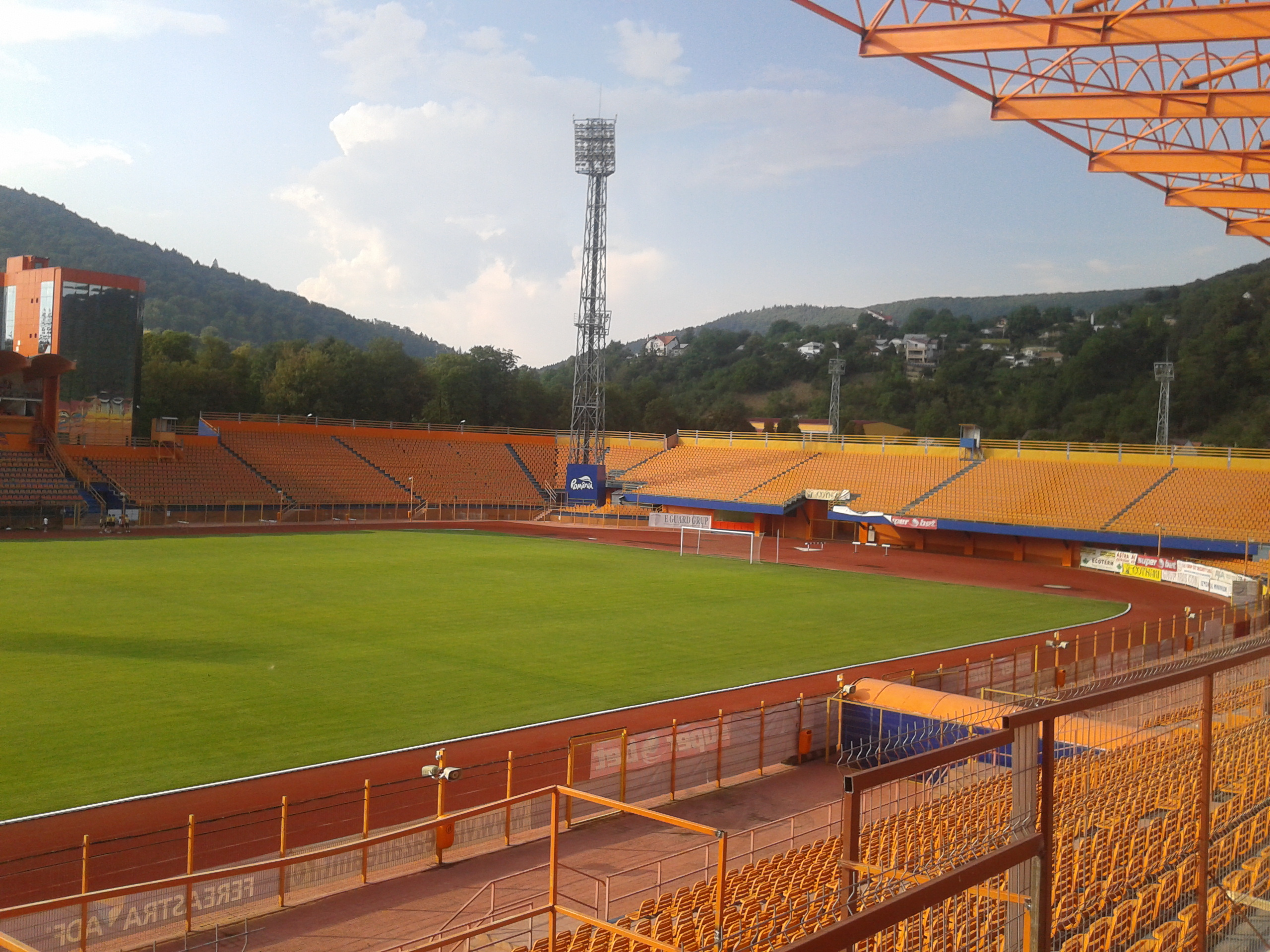
Ceahlăul Stadium in 2013.

The club plays its home matches on Stadionul Ceahlăul from Piatra Neamț. Originally known as Borzoghean and still nicknamed in this mode by the supporters, the stadium had a capacity of 12,000 seats and the shape of letter "U". Between 2006 and 2007 the stadium was renovated, extended (a new End Sector was built), orange seats were mounted instead of the old yellow and black ones and a floodlight installation was also installed. The capacity reached 18,000 seats after other renovations which took place in the early 2010s. Stadionul Ceahlăul is a 3 star ranked in the UEFA stadium categories.

== Support ==
Ceahlăul has many supporters in Piatra Neamț and especially in Neamț County. They are not exactly the ultras type, but despite this fact some ultras groups were formed over time such as: Brigate Ultras 2009 and Tinerii Nemțeni. In 2010 "the Yellow and Blacks" supporters surprised everyone by the fact that they had the first and only ultras leader in Romania, who is a woman, Geanina Ciocoiu.

=== Rivalries ===
Ceahlăul does not have important rivalries, most of them being regional, the so-called Derby-urile Moldovei (Moldavia Derbies) against teams such as: FCM Bacău, FC Politehnica Iași or Oțelul Galați and most recently against FC Vaslui or FC Botoșani.

=== Trivia ===
In 2006, Gelu Crăcană, a fan of Ceahlăul Piatra Neamț created a 420 square meters (500 including the sleeves) Ceahlăul Piatra Neamț jersey shirt with Florin Axinia's name on it which entered the Guinness World Records Hall of fame.

Chronology of names
| Years | Name |
| 1919–1949 | Ceahlăul Piatra Neamț |
| 1949–1951 | Progresul Piatra Neamț |
| 1951–1957 | Avântul Piatra Neamț |
| 1957 | Recolta Piatra Neamț |
| 1958–1961 | CS Piatra Neamț |
| 1961–1978 | Ceahlăul Piatra Neamț |
| 1978–1979 | Relon Ceahlăul Piatra Neamț |
| 1979–1993 | Ceahlăul Piatra Neamț |
| 1993 | Ceahlăul Simpex |
| 1993–present | Ceahlăul Piatra Neamț |

== Honours ==
=== Domestic ===
==== Leagues ====
- Divizia B / Liga II
  - Winners (4): 1992–93, 2005–06, 2008–09, 2010–11
- Divizia C / Liga III
  - Winners (2): 1964–65, 1979–80
  - Runners-up (1): 2022–23
- Liga IV – Neamț County
  - Winners (1): 2017–18
- Liga V – Neamț County
  - Winners (1): 2016–17

==== Other leagues ====
- Moldavia Championship
  - Winners (1): 1926

==== Cups ====
- Cupa României – Neamț County
  - Winners (1): 2017–18

=== International ===
- UEFA Intertoto Cup
  - Third round (2): 1999, 2000
  - Round of 16 (1): 1995

== European record ==
=== European cups all-time statistics ===
| Competition | S | P | W | D | L | GF | GA | GD |
|---|---|---|---|---|---|---|---|---|
| UEFA Intertoto Cup | 4 | 19 | 11 | 4 | 4 | 31 | 19 | + 12 |
| Total | 4 | 19 | 11 | 4 | 4 | 31 | 19 | + 12 |

== Players ==
=== First team squad ===
As of 28 February 2026

Note: Flags indicate national team as defined under FIFA eligibility rules; some limited exceptions apply. Players may hold more than one non-FIFA nationality.

| No. | Pos. | Nation | Player |
|---|---|---|---|
| 1 | GK | ROU | Luca Grecu |
| 5 | MF | ROU | Ovidiu Mahu Moisii |
| 7 | MF | ROU | Antonio Suciu (on loan from Universitatea Cluj) |
| 8 | MF | ROU | Denis Popovici |
| 9 | FW | ROU | Octavian Costan |
| 10 | MF | ROU | Alexandru Anton |
| 11 | MF | ROU | Geani Crețu (3rd captain) |
| 14 | DF | ROU | Tudor Anton |
| 17 | MF | ROU | Matei Ilioaia |
| 19 | DF | ROU | Irinel Patrichi |
| 20 | FW | COL | Ronald Granja |

| No. | Pos. | Nation | Player |
|---|---|---|---|
| 22 | DF | ROU | Rareș Munteanu (on loan from Farul Constanța) |
| 23 | GK | ROU | Ionuț Chiriac |
| 24 | DF | ROU | Mihai Șandru |
| 25 | DF | GHA | Emmanuel Asibey |
| 28 | MF | ROU | Andrei Florea |
| 34 | MF | ROU | Matei Romanescu |
| 44 | DF | ROU | Andrei Marc (Captain) |
| 67 | GK | ROU | Alexandru Barna (Vice-captain) |
| 80 | MF | ROU | Răzvan Matiș |
| 92 | DF | ROU | Cătălin Pîntea |
| 94 | MF | ROU | Răzvan Buțerchi |
| 98 | MF | ROU | Vlad Munteanu |

=== Out on loan ===
Note: Flags indicate national team as defined under FIFA eligibility rules; some limited exceptions apply. Players may hold more than one non-FIFA nationality.

| No. / Pos. / Nation / Player; — / DF / ROU / Bogdan Curbăt (to Bucovina Rădăuți) | No. / Pos. / Nation / Player; — / DF / ROU / Simone Docan (to CSM Vaslui) |

== Club Officials ==
=== Board of directors ===
| Role | Name |
|---|---|
| Owners | (Romania) Anton Măzărianu (Romania) Piatra Neamț Municipality |
| President | vacant |
| General Director | (Romania) Daniel Mahu Moisii |
| Sporting Director | vacant |
| Press Officer | (Romania) Marcel Mihalcea |

=== Current technical staff ===
| Role | Name |
|---|---|
| Head coach | (Romania) Vasile Avădanei |
| Assistant coach | vacant |
| Goalkeeping coach | (Romania) Florin Anton |
| Kinetotherapist | (Romania) Constantin Stan |
| Masseur | (Romania) Ioan Stan |

== League and cup history ==
| Season | Tier | League | Place | Notes | Cupa României |
|---|---|---|---|---|---|
| 2026–27 | 3 | Liga III | TBD | | Second round |
| 2025–26 | 2 | Liga II | 18th (R) | Relegated | Play-off round |
| 2024–25 | 2 | Liga II | 2nd (play-out) | | Group stage |
| 2023–24 | 2 | Liga II | 2nd (play-out) | | Play-off round |
| 2022–23 | 3 | Liga III (Seria I) | 2nd | Promoted | First round |
| 2021–22 | 3 | Liga III (Seria I) | 5th | | Second round |
| 2020–21 | 3 | Liga III (Seria I) | 3rd | | Round of 32 |
| 2019–20 | 3 | Liga III (Seria I) | 3rd | | Third round |
| 2018–19 | 3 | Liga III (Seria I) | 10th | | Third round |
| 2017–18 | 4 | Liga IV (NT) | 1st (C) | Promoted | County phase |
| 2015–16 | 2 | Liga II (Seria I) | 12th | Withdrew | Fifth round |
| 2014–15 | 1 | Liga I | 18th | Relegated | Round of 16 |
| 2013–14 | 1 | Liga I | 9th | | Round of 32 |
| 2012–13 | 1 | Liga I | 14th | | Quarter-finals |
| 2011–12 | 1 | Liga I | 11th | | Round of 32 |
| 2010–11 | 2 | Liga II (Seria I) | 1st (C) | Promoted | Round of 32 |
| 2009–10 | 1 | Liga I | 17th | Relegated | Round of 32 |
| 2008–09 | 2 | Liga II (Seria I) | 1st (C) | Promoted | |

| Season | Tier | League | Place | Notes | Cupa României |
|---|---|---|---|---|---|
| 2007–08 | 1 | Liga I | 15th | Relegated | Round of 16 |
| 2006–07 | 1 | Liga I | 15th | | Round of 32 |
| 2005–06 | 2 | Divizia B (Seria I) | 1st (C) | Promoted | |
| 2004–05 | 2 | Divizia B (Seria I) | 5th | | |
| 2003–04 | 1 | Divizia A | 14th | Relegated | Round of 32 |
| 2002–03 | 1 | Divizia A | 5th | | Round of 32 |
| 2001–02 | 1 | Divizia A | 8th | | Quarter-finals |
| 2000–01 | 1 | Divizia A | 11th | | Round of 16 |
| 1999–00 | 1 | Divizia A | 4th | | Round of 16 |
| 1998–99 | 1 | Divizia A | 9th | | Round of 16 |
| 1997–98 | 1 | Divizia A | 9th | | Round of 32 |
| 1996–97 | 1 | Divizia A | 6th | | Round of 16 |
| 1995–96 | 1 | Divizia A | 15th | | Round of 32 |
| 1994–95 | 1 | Divizia A | 5th | | Round of 32 |
| 1993–94 | 1 | Divizia A | 10th | | Round of 32 |
| 1992–93 | 2 | Divizia B (Seria I) | 1st (C) | Promoted | |
| 1991–92 | 2 | Divizia B (Seria III) | 3rd | | Round of 32 |
| 1990–91 | 2 | Divizia B (Seria I) | 3rd | | |
| 1989–90 | 2 | Divizia B (Seria I) | 14th | | |

== Notable former players ==
The footballers enlisted below have had international cap(s) for their respective countries at junior and/or senior level and/or more than 100 caps for CSM Ceahlăul Piatra Neamț.

Romania

- (Romania) Vlad Achim
- (Romania) Angelo Alistar
- (Romania) Florin Axinia
- (Romania) Gheorghe Axinia
- (Romania) Vasile Avădanei
- (Romania) Ionuț Bădescu
- (Romania) Daniel Barna
- (Romania) Dumitru Botez
- (Romania) Lucian Burdujan
- (Romania) Sebastian Chitoșcă
- (Romania) Marian Constantinescu
- (Romania) Lucian Covrig
- (Romania) Codruț Domșa
- (Romania) Cristian Dulca
- (Romania) Andrei Dumitraș
- (Romania) Costel Enache
- (Romania) Alexandru Forminte
- (Romania) Dorin Goian
- (Romania) Lucian Goian
- (Romania) Leontin Grozavu
- (Romania) Alexandru Ichim
- (Romania) Adrian Iencsi
- (Romania) Mihai Dan Ionescu
- (Romania) Constantin Ilie
- (Romania) Radu Lefter
- (Romania) Ovidiu Marc
- (Romania) Sebastian Moga
- (Romania) Mihai Nemțanu
- (Romania) Gheorghe Nițu
- (Romania) Florin Nohai
- (Romania) Dănuț Perjă
- (Romania) Patrick Petre
- (Romania) Doru Popadiuc
- (Romania) Marian Purică
- (Romania) Ion Sburlea
- (Romania) Tiberiu Șerban
- (Romania) Vasile Șoiman
- (Romania) Adrian Solomon
- (Romania) Costel Solomon
- (Romania) Andrei Vițelaru

Armenia

- (Armenia) Arman Karamyan

Bosnia and Herzegovina

- (Bosnia and Herzegovina) Bojan Golubović
- (Bosnia and Herzegovina) Duško Stajić

Ghana

- (Ghana) Raman Chibsah
- (Ghana) Hamza Mohammed

Lithuania

- (Lithuania) Vaidas Slavickas

Macedonia

- (North Macedonia) Krste Velkoski

Moldova

- (Moldova) Nicolae Calancea
- (Moldova) Eugeniu Cebotaru
- (Moldova) Viorel Frunză
- (Moldova) Alexandru Golban

DR Congo

- (Democratic Republic of the Congo) Rodrigue Dikaba

Guinea-Bissau

- (Guinea-Bissau) Bruno Fernandes

Peru

- (Peru) Piero Saldívar

Rwanda

- (Rwanda) Jimmy Mulisa

Tunisia

- (Tunisia) Haykel Guemamdia

== Notable former managers ==
- (Romania) Ștefan Wetzer (1962–1963)
- (Romania) Ștefan Coidum (1963–1964)
- (Romania) Petre Steinbach (1968–1969)
- (Romania) Dumitru Dumitriu (1980–1982)
- (Romania) Vasile Copil (1983–1984)
- (Romania) Ioan Sdrobiș (1992)
- (Romania) Ion Nunweiller (1992–1993)
- (Romania) Mircea Nedelcu (1993–1995)
- (Romania) Florin Marin (1996–1997)
- (Romania) Mihai Radu (1997) (interim)
- (Romania) Mircea Nedelcu (1997–1998)
- (Romania) Florin Marin (1998)
- (Romania) Viorel Hizo (1998–2000)
- (Romania) Mircea Nedelcu (2000)
- (Romania) Florin Halagian (2000)
- (Romania) Florin Marin (2001)
- (Romania) Cornel Țălnar (2001)
- (Romania) Florin Marin (2001)
- (Romania) Marin Barbu (2002)
- (Romania) Viorel Hizo (2003–2004)
- (Romania) Marius Lăcătuș (2004)
- (Romania) Florin Marin (2005)
- (Romania) Marin Barbu (2005–2006)
- (Romania) Florin Marin (2006–2007)
- (Romania) Viorel Hizo (2007–2008)
- (Romania) Florin Marin (2008–2009)
- (Romania) Gheorghe Mulțescu (2009–2010)
- (Montenegro) Zoran Filipović (2010)
- (Romania) Marin Barbu (2010–2011)
- (Romania) Viorel Hizo (2013)
- (Romania) Vasile Miriuță (2013)
- (Romania) Marin Barbu (2014)
- (Romania) Constantin Ilie (2014)
- (Romania) Florin Marin (2014–2015)
- (Italy) Stefano Maccoppi (2016)
- (Romania) Toader Șteț (2016–2017)
- (Romania) Gabriel Rădulescu (2018–2019)
- (Romania) Ștefan Stoica (2019–2020)
- (Romania) Gabriel Rădulescu (2020–2021)
- (Romania) Constantin Ilie (2021)
- (Romania) Gabriel Rădulescu (2021)
- (Romania) Florentin Petre (2022)
- (Italy) Marco Veronese (2024–2025)
