= Mihai Dan Ionescu =

Romanian footballer

Mihai Ionescu
Personal information
- Full name: Mihai Dan Ionescu
- Date of birth: 29 September 1968 (age 58)
- Place of birth: Piatra Neamț, Romania
- Height: 1.79 m (5 ft 10 in)
- Positions: Attacking midfielder; central midfielder

Team information
- Current team: Aerostar Bacău (manager)

Youth career
- Celuloza Piatra Neamț
- Textila Buhuși

Senior career*
Years	Team	Apps	(Gls)
1991–2002	Ceahlăul Piatra Neamț	286	(45)
2002	Constructorul Ciobruciu	8	(1)
2002–2003	Ceahlăul Piatra Neamț	11	(1)
Total		305	(47)

Managerial career
- 2008: Ceahlăul Piatra Neamț II
- 2009: Ceahlăul Piatra Neamț (caretaker)
- 2015: Ceahlăul Piatra Neamț
- 2016: Aerostar Bacău
- 2018–2020: Mostiștea Ulmu
- 2021–: Aerostar Bacău
- * Club domestic league appearances and goals

Mihai Dan Ionescu (born 29 September 1968) is a Romanian former footballer who played as a midfielder. After he ended his playing career, he worked as a manager. In 2017 Ionescu received the Honorary Citizen of Dragomirești title.

== Honours ==
Ceahlăul Piatra Neamț

- Divizia B: 1992–93
