= 2001–02 Divizia A =

84th season of top-tier football league in Romania

Divizia A
- Season: 2001–02
- Champions: Dinamo București
- Relegated: Petrolul Ploiești; UM Timișoara
- Champions League: Dinamo București
- UEFA Cup: Național București; Rapid București
- Intertoto Cup: Gloria Bistrița
- Matches: 240
- Goals: 607 (2.53 per match)
- Top goalscorer: Cătălin Cursaru (17)
- Biggest home win: Rapid 6–0 UMT
- Biggest away win: Bacău 1–5 Național; Argeș 0–4 Național; Argeș 0–4 Steaua
- Highest scoring: Farul 5–3 Universitatea
- Longest winning run: Rapid, Național, Steaua, Bacău, Dinamo, Argeș, Oțelul (4)
- Longest unbeaten run: Dinamo (16)
- Longest losing run: Farul (6)

The 2001–02 Divizia A was the eighty-fourth season of Divizia A, the top-level football league of Romania. Season began in August 2001 and ended in May 2002. Dinamo București was crowned as champion for the 16th time.

== Team changes ==
=== Relegated ===
The teams that were relegated to Divizia B at the end of the previous season (note that although FCM Bacău lost the relegation play–off, it remained in the Divizia A, after it bought the first division place from the promoted team FC Baia Mare):

- Foresta Fălticeni
- Rocar București
- Gaz Metan Mediaș

=== Promoted ===
The teams that were promoted from Divizia B at the start of the season:

- Sportul Studențesc București
- UM Timișoara
- Farul Constanța

=== Venues ===
Steaua București	FC U Craiova	Rapid București	FCM Bacău
Steaua	Ion Oblemenco	Giulești-Valentin Stănescu	Dumitru Sechelariu
Capacity: 28,365	Capacity: 25,252	Capacity: 19,100	Capacity: 17,500
Farul Constanța	Dinamo București	Argeș Pitești	Sportul Studențesc
Gheorghe Hagi	Dinamo	Municipal	Regie
Capacity: 15,520	Capacity: 15,032	Capacity: 15,000	Capacity: 15,000
Național București	2001–02 Divizia A (Romania) Location of Bucharest teams.		Petrolul Ploiești
Cotroceni	2001–02 Divizia A (Romania) Location of Bucharest teams.		Ilie Oană
Capacity: 14,542	2001–02 Divizia A (Romania) Location of Bucharest teams.		Capacity: 14,000
Oțelul Galați	2001–02 Divizia A (Romania) Location of Bucharest teams.		Ceahlăul Piatra Neamț
Oțelul	2001–02 Divizia A (Romania) Location of Bucharest teams.		Ceahlăul
Capacity: 13,500	2001–02 Divizia A (Romania) Location of Bucharest teams.		Capacity: 12,500
FC Brașov	UM Timișoara	Gloria Bistrița	Astra Ploiești
Tineretului	UMT	Gloria	Astra
Capacity: 10,000	Capacity: 9,900	Capacity: 7,800	Capacity: 7,000

=== Personnel and kits ===
Team	Head coach	Captain	Kit manufacturer	Shirt Sponsor
Argeș Pitești	(Romania) Florin Halagian	(Romania) Cristian Bălașa	Erreà	Dacia
Astra Ploiești	(Romania) Gheorghe Mulțescu	(Romania) Marin Dună	Valsport	Kronos
Brașov	(Romania) Ferenc Bajkó	(Romania) Cosmin Bodea	Valsport	Prescon
Ceahlăul Piatra Neamț	(Romania) Marin Barbu	(Romania) Florin Axinia	Ancada	Rifil
Dinamo București	(Romania) Cornel Dinu	(Romania) Ioan Lupescu / Giani Kiriță	Lotto	Cosmorom
Farul Constanța	(Romania) Petre Grigoraș	(Romania) Vasilică Cristocea	Erreà	Cuget Liber
FC U Craiova	(Romania) Florin Marin	(Romania) Flavius Stoican	Erreà	Vincon
FCM Bacău	(Romania) Gheorghe Poenaru	(Romania) Radu Ciobanu	Legea	Sonoma
Gloria Bistrița	(Romania) Constantin Cârstea	(Romania) Vasile Popa	Umbro	Darimex
Național București	(Romania) Cosmin Olăroiu	(Romania) Ovidiu Petre	Kappa	—
Oțelul Galați	(Romania) Marius Lăcătuș	(Romania) Bogdan Andone	Adidas	Sidex
Petrolul Ploiești	(Romania) Victor Roșca	(Romania) Dinu Todoran	Adidas	Petrom
Rapid București	(Romania) Mircea Rednic	(Romania) Adrian Iencsi	Erreà	Connex
Sportul Studențesc	(Romania) Ioan Andone	(Romania) Romeo Pădureț	Valsport	Omniasig
Steaua București	(Romania) Victor Pițurcă	(Romania) Marius Baciu	Adidas	BCR
UM Timișoara	(Romania) Gheorghe Staicu	(Romania) Florian Călin	Valsport	UMT

== League table ==
Pos	Team	Pld	W	D	L	GF	GA	GD	Pts	Qualification or relegation
1	Dinamo București (C)	30	17	9	4	63	33	+30	60	Qualification to Champions League second qualifying round
2	Național București	30	16	10	4	44	20	+24	58	Qualification to UEFA Cup qualifying round
3	Rapid București (Note: Rapid București had 1 point deducted for walking off in round 13.)	30	15	6	9	50	31	+19	50 (Note: RAP 3-0 STE; STE 2-1 RAP)	Qualification to UEFA Cup qualifying round
4	Steaua București	30	15	5	10	47	31	+16	50	
5	Oțelul Galați	30	14	7	9	34	24	+10	49	
6	Bacău	30	14	4	12	43	40	+3	46	
7	Universitatea Craiova	30	12	8	10	40	35	+5	44	
8	Ceahlăul Piatra Neamț	30	13	4	13	35	37	−2	43	
9	Gloria Bistrița	30	13	2	15	29	41	−12	41	Qualification to Intertoto Cup first round
10	Argeș Pitești	30	11	7	12	36	39	−3	40	
11	Brașov	30	10	9	11	33	34	−1	39	
12	Astra Ploiești	30	9	10	11	29	28	+1	37	
13	Sportul Studențesc București	30	9	7	14	40	53	−13	34	Qualification to relegation play-offs
14	Farul Constanța	30	8	8	14	32	44	−12	32	Qualification to relegation play-offs
15	Petrolul Ploiești (R)	30	5	10	15	30	48	−18	25	Relegation to Divizia B
16	UM Timișoara (R)	30	3	6	21	24	71	−47	15	Relegation to Divizia B

Source: LT (in Romanian)
Rules for classification: 1) points; 2) head-to-head points; 3) head-to-head goal difference; 4) head-to-head goals scored; 5) goal difference; 6) number of goals scored.
(C) Champions; (R) Relegated

=== Positions by round ===
Team ╲ Round	1	2	3	4	5	6	7	8	9	10	11	12	13	14	15	16	17	18	19	20	21	22	23	24	25	26	27	28	29	30
Argeș Pitești	11	12	14	15	15	15	15	15	15	15	14	14	14	15	13	12	13	12	11	10	9	9	10	11	10	9	8	8	11	10
Astra Ploiești	5	8	5	5	8	9	8	10	11	11	12	12	12	12	12	13	12	13	13	13	12	12	11	8	11	8	10	11	12	12
Bacău	12	13	8	12	12	13	11	12	10	8	5	5	5	7	10	11	9	8	7	8	7	5	5	5	6	6	6	6	6	6
Brașov	7	4	11	7	7	8	9	8	9	7	10	10	8	10	11	10	11	9	12	12	13	13	13	13	12	12	11	12	10	11
Ceahlăul Piatra Neamț	13	9	12	14	14	14	14	13	14	12	13	11	11	9	8	9	7	7	8	7	5	6	7	7	9	11	12	10	9	8
Universitatea Craiova	1	6	6	10	9	5	6	7	8	10	9	8	6	5	5	5	5	6	6	6	8	8	9	10	8	7	7	7	7	7
Dinamo București	4	3	1	2	5	4	4	4	3	2	2	2	1	1	1	1	1	1	1	1	1	1	1	1	2	2	2	2	2	1
Farul Constanța	8	14	15	13	13	12	7	6	6	6	8	6	9	6	6	7	8	10	9	9	11	11	12	12	13	13	13	14	14	14
Gloria Bistrița	16	11	7	8	3	3	3	3	5	5	7	9	7	8	7	8	10	11	10	11	10	10	8	9	7	10	9	9	8	9
Oțelul Galați	9	5	10	6	10	10	12	9	7	9	6	7	10	11	9	6	6	5	5	4	4	4	4	4	3	5	5	5	4	5
Petrolul Ploiești	14	10	13	11	11	11	13	14	13	14	11	13	13	16	14	14	15	15	14	14	15	15	15	15	15	15	15	15	15	15
Național București	10	15	9	3	6	6	5	5	4	4	4	3	2	2	2	3	2	2	3	3	2	2	2	2	1	1	1	1	1	2
Rapid București	2	2	2	1	1	1	1	1	1	1	1	1	3	3	4	4	4	3	2	2	3	3	3	3	4	4	3	4	5	3
Sportul Studențesc București	3	7	4	9	4	7	10	11	12	13	15	15	15	13	15	15	14	14	15	15	14	14	14	14	14	14	14	13	13	13
Steaua București	6	1	3	4	2	2	2	2	2	3	3	4	4	4	3	2	3	4	4	5	6	7	6	6	5	3	4	3	3	4
UMT Timișoara	15	16	16	16	16	16	16	16	16	16	16	16	16	14	16	16	16	16	16	16	16	16	16	16	16	16	16	16	16	16

Source: LT (in Romanian)

=== Results ===
Home \ Away	ARG	AST	BAC	BRA	CEA	UCR	DIN	FAR	GBI	OȚE	PET	NAT	RAP	SPO	STE	UMT
Argeș Pitești	—	2–0	3–3	1–0	1–0	1–0	1–2	1–1	3–0	1–0	1–1	0–4	1–0	5–1	0–4	4–1
Astra Ploiești	1–0	—	1–0	3–0	3–0	2–2	1–1	1–0	1–0	0–0	2–1	0–1	1–2	0–0	1–1	1–0
Bacău	2–0	2–1	—	2–0	1–1	0–0	4–2	3–0	2–0	1–0	2–0	1–5	1–0	2–2	0–1	1–0
Brașov	2–0	1–0	1–0	—	2–0	1–1	1–1	0–0	0–0	1–0	4–1	1–1	3–0	2–0	3–2	6–1
Ceahlăul Piatra Neamț	2–0	1–1	2–0	1–0	—	0–1	1–2	1–0	4–1	2–1	1–3	1–1	1–0	2–1	0–1	5–1
Universitatea Craiova	1–0	1–0	3–0	0–0	0–1	—	0–2	3–0	4–0	1–0	0–2	2–1	2–2	3–0	2–0	0–0
Dinamo București	2–1	1–1	4–2	4–0	3–1	2–0	—	1–1	1–0	2–2	4–1	0–0	3–2	5–1	2–0	5–1
Farul Constanța	1–0	3–2	2–3	1–1	1–2	5–3	2–2	—	1–0	0–2	2–1	0–3	1–3	0–0	0–2	3–0
Gloria Bistrița	2–0	2–1	2–0	1–0	2–0	1–2	1–2	2–1	—	1–0	1–0	1–0	0–1	4–1	2–1	3–1
Oțelul Galați	2–1	0–0	2–1	3–0	0–0	2–1	2–1	0–0	1–0	—	0–0	2–0	2–0	4–2	1–0	2–1
Petrolul Ploiești	1–1	1–0	0–1	2–2	3–0	2–0	1–2	1–1	0–1	1–2	—	0–0	0–2	1–1	1–1	0–2
Național București	1–2	2–1	2–1	1–0	3–1	1–1	1–0	2–0	2–0	1–1	2–2	—	1–0	1–1	3–2	3–0
Rapid București	1–1	1–1	1–0	1–1	1–3	3–2	2–2	2–1	5–0	2–1	4–1	0–0	—	1–0	3–0	6–0
Sportul Studențesc București	3–3	1–2	1–3	1–0	3–1	2–3	1–0	0–3	2–0	2–1	3–0	0–1	0–1	—	3–1	3–0
Steaua București	0–1	1–0	2–1	4–0	1–0	4–1	2–2	3–0	1–1	2–0	4–1	0–0	2–1	1–2	—	1–0
UMT Timișoara	1–1	1–1	2–4	2–1	0–1	1–1	0–3	0–2	4–1	0–1	2–2	0–1	0–3	3–3	0–3	—

Source: LT (in Romanian)
Legend: Blue = home team win; Yellow = draw; Red = away team win.

== Promotion / relegation play-off ==
The teams placed on the 13th and 14th place in the Divizia A faced the 2nd placed teams from both groups of the Divizia B. Sportul Studențesc and Farul Constanța won the relegation play-offs, thus, they have kept their places in the Liga I, while Cimentul Fieni and FC Baia Mare will still play in Liga II in the 2002–03 season.

Team 1	Agg.	Team 2	1st leg	2nd leg
Cimentul Fieni	1–5	Sportul Studențesc	0–3	1–2
Farul Constanța	1–0	FC Baia Mare	1–0	0–0

8 June 2002 Leg 1	Cimentul Fieni	0 – 3	Sportul Studențesc	Stadionul Cimentul
			Bălan 36'; Mazilu 40'; Diniță 90'

8 June 2002 Leg 1	Farul Constanța	1 – 0	FC Baia Mare	Stadionul Farul
	Voicu 35'

12 June 2002 Leg 2	Sportul Studențesc	2 – 1	Cimentul Fieni	Stadionul Regie
	Bălan 24'; Diniță 54'		Albulescu 44'

12 June 2002 Leg 2	FC Baia Mare	0 – 0	Farul Constanța	Stadionul Viorel Mateianu

== Top goalscorers ==
Position	Player	Club	Goals
1	Cătălin Cursaru	Bacău	17
2	Claudiu Niculescu	Dinamo București	15
2	Daniel Pancu	Rapid București	15
4	Claudiu Răducanu	Steaua București	14
5	Gheorghe Bucur	Sportul Studențesc	13

== Champion squad ==
Dinamo București

Goalkeepers: Bogdan Lobonț (22 / 0); Florin Prunea (6 / 0); Alexandru Iliuciuc (2 / 0).
Defenders: Mugur Bolohan (26 / 5); Adrian Iordache (1 / 0); Sorin Iodi (11 / 0); Giani Kiriță (28 / 2); Valentin Năstase (13 / 2); Bogdan Onuț (27 / 2); Iosif Tâlvan (26 / 0); Marian Vătavu (11 / 0); Dorin Semeghin (13 / 1); Cristian Pulhac (1 / 0).
Midfielders: Romulus Buia (9 / 0); Constantin Ilie (10 / 0); Ioan Lupescu (7 / 0); Vlad Munteanu (19 / 5); Florin Pârvu (20 / 1); Răzvan Pădurețu (1 / 0); Florentin Petre (10 / 1); Cătălin Rață (1 / 0); Ovidiu Stîngă (18 / 0); Iulian Tameș (29 / 6); Ianis Zicu (16 / 2).
Forwards: Bogdan Aldea (1 / 0); Alexandru Bălțoi (4 / 0); Ionel Dănciulescu (13 / 3); Claudiu Drăgan (23 / 4); Sabin Ilie (7 / 3); Adrian Mihalcea (14 / 11); Claudiu Niculescu (28 / 15); Ciprian Marica (2 / 0).
(league appearances and goals listed in brackets)

Manager: Marin Ion / Cornel Dinu.

== Attendances ==
#	Club	Average
1	Craiova	8,978
2	FC Rapid	8,333
3	Oțelul	7,833
4	Bacău	7,533
5	Dinamo 1948	7,000
6	Steaua	6,533
7	Brașov	5,567
8	Argeș	5,300
9	Farul	5,020
10	Ceahlăul	4,940
11	Petrolul	4,833
12	UMT	4,367
13	Sportul Studenţesc	4,047
14	Astra	3,940
15	Gloria	3,913
16	Național	3,600
