= Vasile Șoiman =

Romanian footballer

Personal information
- Date of birth: 10 August 1960 (age 66)
- Place of birth: Icușești, Romania
- Position: Midfielder

Youth career
- CSS Roman

Senior career*
Years	Team	Apps	(Gls)
1974–1977	Danubiana Roman		
1977–1978	Relon Ceahlăul Piatra Neamț		
1978–1991	SC Bacău	312	(47)
1991–1993	Ceahlăul Piatra Neamț		
1993–1994	Cotidian Bacău		
Total		312	(47)

International career
1981–1986	Romania	3	(0)
- * Club domestic league appearances and goals

Vasile Șoiman (born 10 August 1960) is a Romanian former football midfielder. After he retired from playing football, Șoiman worked as a police officer.

== International career ==
Vasile Șoiman played three friendly matches at international level for Romania, making his debut under coach Valentin Stănescu, when he came as a substitute and replaced Zoltan Crișan in the 55th minute of a 2–1 loss against Bulgaria. His following two caps were a 2–2 against Poland and a 0–0 against Iraq, both under coach Mircea Lucescu.

== Honours ==
Ceahlăul Piatra Neamț

- Divizia B: 1992–93
