= Nemțanu =

Nemțanu is a Romanian surname derived from the nickname "Nemeț", 'German person'. Notable people with the surname include:

- Ioana Nemțanu, Romanian volleyball player
- Leonard Nemțanu
- Mihai Nemțanu
- Sarah Nemtanu

== See also ==
- Nemțeanu
