= Dragomirești =

Dragomirești may refer to several places in Romania:

- Dragomirești, Maramureș, a town in Maramureș County
- Dragomirești, Dâmbovița, a commune in Dâmbovița County
- Dragomirești, Neamț, a commune in Neamț County
- Dragomirești, Vaslui, a commune in Vaslui County
- Dragomirești, a village in Știuca Commune, Timiș County
- Dragomirești-Vale, a commune in Ilfov County, and its village of Dragomirești-Deal
