= Ovidiu Marc =

Romanian footballer

Personal information
- Date of birth: 9 April 1968 (age 58)
- Place of birth: Căciulești, Romania
- Height: 1.85 m (6 ft 1 in)
- Positions: Central defender; midfielder

Youth career
- CSȘ Olimpia Piatra-Neamţ
- Ceahlăul Piatra Neamț
- Celuloza Roznov

Senior career*
Years	Team	Apps	(Gls)
1987–1988	Relonul Săvinești		
1988–2001	Ceahlăul Piatra Neamț (Note: The statistics for the 1988–89, 1989–90, 1990–91, 1991–92 and 1992–93 Divizia B seasons are unavailable.)	186	(48)

Managerial career
- 2001: Ceahlăul Piatra Neamț (caretaker)
- 2008–2009: Ceahlăul Piatra Neamț II
- 2011–2012: Petrotub Roman
- 2012–2013: Cetatea Târgu Neamț
- 2014: Ceahlăul Piatra Neamț II
- 2018: Cetatea Târgu Neamț
- * Club domestic league appearances and goals

Ovidiu Marc (born 9 April 1968) is a Romanian former professional footballer who played as a defender and midfielder. After he ended his playing career, he worked as a manager. His son, Andrei Marc was also a footballer who played at Ceahlăul Piatra Neamț.

== Honours ==
Ceahlăul Piatra Neamț

- Divizia B: 1992–93
