= Constantin Ilie =

Romanian footballer

Personal information
- Full name: Constantin Ionuț Ilie
- Date of birth: 19 September 1974 (age 52)
- Place of birth: Piatra Neamț, Romania
- Height: 1.78 m (5 ft 10 in)
- Position: Midfielder

Youth career
- –1995: Ceahlăul Piatra Neamț

Senior career*
Years	Team	Apps	(Gls)
1995–1996	Cetatea Târgu Neamț	31	(1)
1996–2001	Ceahlăul Piatra Neamț	160	(23)
2002	Dinamo București	10	(0)
2002–2004	Ceahlăul Piatra Neamț	108	(9)
2004	→ Vaslui (loan)	9	(1)
Total		318	(34)

Managerial career
- 2013–2014: Ceahlăul Piatra Neamț
- 2014–2015: Ceahlăul Piatra Neamț (assistant)
- 2015: Ceahlăul Piatra Neamț
- 2015: Aerostar Bacău
- 2015–2016: Rapid CFR Suceava
- 2016: Atletico Vaslui
- 2016: ASA Târgu Mureș (assistant)
- 2016–2017: Concordia Chiajna (assistant)
- 2017–2019: Dunărea Călărași (assistant)
- 2019: Astra Giurgiu (assistant)
- 2020: Rapid București (assistant)
- 2021: Ceahlăul Piatra Neamț
- 2021–2022: Sporting Juniorul Vaslui
- 2022–2023: Înainte Modelu
- 2023–2024: Politehnica Iași (assistant)
- 2024–2025: FC Bacău (youth coach)
- 2025–2026: FC Bacău II
- * Club domestic league appearances and goals

Constantin Ionuț Ilie (born 19 September 1974), commonly known as Costel Ilie, is a Romanian former professional footballer and currently the head coach of Liga III side Bacău II.

== Playing career ==
Ilie was born on 19 September 1974 in Piatra Neamț. He began playing football at CSȘF Olimpia in Piatra Neamț before moving to the youth system of Ceahlăul Piatra Neamț, where he started his senior career before joining Cetatea Târgu Neamț in 1995, competing in Divizia B, the second tier of Romanian football.

In 1996, he made his debut in Liga I, Romania’s top flight, for Ceahlăul Piatra Neamț in a 1–0 away defeat against Chindia Târgoviște, and over more than a decade established himself as one of the team’s most consistent midfielders. He made 268 appearances in Liga I, scoring 31 goals, and also featured in European competitions such as the UEFA Intertoto Cup. He had a brief spell at Dinamo București, where he won the 2001–02 Divizia A title, and also played for Vaslui before retiring in 2007 while back at Ceahlăul Piatra Neamț.

== Managerial career ==
After retirement, he began his coaching career as an assistant at the second team of Ceahlăul Piatra Neamț, later moving up to the first team. He was appointed head coach in 2013 after Vasile Miriuță was dismissed, before returning to an assistant role in April 2014 under Marian Bondrea.

He then worked in various coaching roles across Romanian football. As head coach, he managed teams such as Ceahlăul Piatra Neamț, Aerostar Bacău, Rapid CFR Suceava, and Atletico Vaslui. As assistant coach, he worked at clubs including ASA Târgu Mureș, Concordia Chiajna, Dunărea Călărași, Astra Giurgiu, and Rapid București.

He later returned briefly as head coach at Ceahlăul in 2021, worked at Sporting Juniorul Vaslui and Înainte Modelu, served as assistant at Politehnica Iași, and in 2024 was appointed coach of FC Bacău U18, before taking charge of FC Bacău II in Liga III from 2025.

== Personal life ==
His son, Matei, is also a professional footballer.

== Honours ==
Dinamo București

- Divizia A: 2001–02
- Cupa României runner-up: 2001–02

Ceahlăul Piatra Neamț

- Divizia B: 2005–06
