= Dumitru Botez =

Romanian footballer

Personal information
- Date of birth: 2 October 1973 (age 53)
- Place of birth: Târgu Neamț, Romania
- Height: 1.87 m (6 ft 2 in)
- Position: Left midfielder

Senior career*
Years	Team	Apps	(Gls)
1995–1996	Cetatea Târgu Neamț	22	(1)
1996–2003	Ceahlăul Piatra Neamț	178	(13)
2004	FC Vaslui	1	(0)
2004–2005	Ceahlăul Piatra Neamț	21	(1)
Total		222	(15)

Managerial career
- 2008–2009: Cetatea Târgu Neamț
- * Club domestic league appearances and goals

Dumitru Botez (born 2 October 1973) is a Romanian former footballer who played as a left midfielder.
