= Codruț Domșa =

Romanian footballer

Personal information
- Full name: Codruț Ștefan Domșa
- Date of birth: 11 January 1974 (age 52)
- Place of birth: Suceava, Romania
- Height: 1.79 m (5 ft 10 in)
- Positions: Left back; right back; left midfielder

Senior career*
Years	Team	Apps	(Gls)
1992–1995	Bucovina Suceava (Note: The statistics for the 1992–93 Divizia B season are unavailable.)	26	(1)
1995–2005	Ceahlăul Piatra Neamț	144	(2)
Total		170	(3)
- * Club domestic league appearances and goals

Codruț Ștefan Domșa (born 11 January 1974) is a Romanian former footballer who played as a defender.
