= Alexandru Ichim =

Romanian footballer

Personal information
- Date of birth: 21 August 1989 (age 37)
- Place of birth: Piatra Neamţ, Romania
- Height: 1.90 m (6 ft 3 in)
- Position: Defender

Youth career
- Ceahlăul Piatra Neamț

Senior career*
Years	Team	Apps	(Gls)
2009–2015	Ceahlăul Piatra Neamț	107	(7)
2016–2017	Botoșani	7	(0)
2017	Brașov	7	(0)
2017	Mioveni	16	(0)
2018	Petrolul Ploiești	12	(0)
2018–2019	Aerostar Bacău	24	(0)
2019	Foresta Suceava	10	(1)
2020	Ozana Târgu Neamț	1	(0)
2020	Bradu Borca	5	(0)
2021	Dante Botoșani	15	(1)
2022–2023	Ceahlăul Piatra Neamț	26	(1)
- * Club domestic league appearances and goals as of 16:15, 24 January 2024 (UTC)

Alexandru Ichim (born 21 August 1989) is a Romanian footballer who plays as a defender.
