= Gheorghe Axinia =

Romanian footballer

Personal information
- Full name: Gheorghe Iulian Axinia
- Date of birth: 27 July 1968 (age 58)
- Place of birth: Piatra Neamț, Romania
- Height: 1.80 m (5 ft 11 in)
- Positions: Right back; central defender

Youth career
- CSȘ Olimpia Piatra-Neamţ

Senior career*
Years	Team	Apps	(Gls)
1987–1988	Textila Buhuși		
1988–1998	Ceahlăul Piatra Neamț (Note: The statistics for the 1988–89, 1989–90, 1990–91, 1991–92 and 1992–93 Divizia B seasons are unavailable.)	73	(0)
- * Club domestic league appearances and goals

Gheorghe Iulian Axinia (also known as Gheorghe Axinia I, born 27 July 1968) is a Romanian former footballer who played as a defender. His brother Florin Axinia was also a footballer, they played together at Ceahlăul Piatra Neamț.

== Honours ==
Ceahlăul Piatra Neamț

- Divizia B: 1992–93
