= Bălușești =

Băluşeşti may refer to several villages in Romania:

- Băluşeşti, a village in Dagâța Commune, Iaşi County
- Băluşeşti, a village in Dochia Commune, Neamţ County
- Băluşeşti, a village in Icușești Commune, Neamţ County
