= Mastacăn =

Mastacăn may refer to several villages in Romania:

- Mastacăn, a village in Borlești Commune, Neamț County
- Mastacăn, a village in Dragomirești Commune, Neamț County
