= Andrei Vițelaru =

Romanian footballer

Personal information
- Date of birth: 3 February 1985 (age 41)
- Place of birth: Piatra Neamț, Romania
- Height: 1.92 m (6 ft 4 in)
- Position: Centre back

Team information
- Current team: Ozana Târgu Neamț
- Number: 3

Youth career
- 1995–2004: Ceahlăul Piatra Neamț

Senior career*
Years	Team	Apps	(Gls)
2004–2012	Ceahlăul Piatra Neamț	135	(5)
2013–2015	Academica Argeș	59	(8)
2015–2019	Racing Beirut	72	(2)
2019	Foresta Suceava		
2020–2023	Ozana Târgu Neamț	?	(?)

Managerial career
- 2023–: Ceahlăul Piatra Neamț II
- * Club domestic league appearances and goals as of 19 March 2020

Andrei Vițelaru (born 3 February 1985) is a Romanian footballer who plays as a defender for Ozana Târgu Neamț.
