= Alexandru Barna =

Romanian professional footballer

Personal information
- Full name: Alexandru Vasile Barna
- Date of birth: 6 July 1993 (age 33)
- Place of birth: Moinești, Romania
- Height: 1.89 m (6 ft 2 in)
- Position: Goalkeeper

Team information
- Current team: Ceahlăul Piatra Neamț
- Number: 67

Youth career
- Ceahlăul Piatra Neamț

Senior career*
Years	Team	Apps	(Gls)
2013–2016	Ceahlăul Piatra Neamț	23	(0)
2016–2018	UTA Arad	5	(0)
2018–	Ceahlăul Piatra Neamț	83	(0)
2020	→ Gloria Buzău (loan)	0	(0)
2020–2021	→ Aerostar Bacău (loan)	0	(0)
- * Club domestic league appearances and goals as of 25 April 2026

Alexandru Vasile Barna (born 6 July 1993) is a Romanian professional footballer who plays as a goalkeeper for Liga III club Ceahlăul Piatra Neamț.
