= Cătălin Cursaru =

Romanian footballer

Personal information
- Full name: Cătălin Marcel Cursaru
- Date of birth: 29 March 1978 (age 48)
- Place of birth: Ploiești, Romania
- Height: 1.83 m (6 ft 0 in)
- Position: Striker

Youth career
- Petrolul Ploiești
- Astra Ploiești

Senior career*
Years	Team	Apps	(Gls)
1997–2000	Astra Ploiești		
1999	→ Chimia Brazi (loan)		
2000–2005	FCM Bacău	130	(49)
2005–2006	FC Vaslui	11	(0)
2006–2008	Progresul București	40	(5)
2008	Aerostar Bacău	8	(2)
2009	Tricolorul Breaza	7	(0)
2010–2011	Prahova Tomșani		
2012	AFC Filipeștii de Pădure		
Total		196	(56)

International career^{‡}
2002	Romania B	2	(1)
- * Club domestic league appearances and goals as of 15 October 2009 ‡ National team caps and goals as of 22 January 2002

Cătălin Marcel Cursaru (born 29 March 1978) is a retired Romanian footballer.

Over the course of seven Divizia A seasons, Cursaru amassed totals of 167 games and 51 goals.

== Club career ==
=== Early career ===
Cursaru was born on 29 March 1978 in Ploiești, Romania and began playing junior-level football at local club Petrolul at the age of 11. A few years later, he joined the junior center of Astra Ploiești. For the 1999–2000 season, he was sent on loan to Divizia C club Chimia Brazi at his request.

=== FCM Bacău ===
On 26 January 2000, Cursaru signed for FCM Bacău, but he played no matches for more than six months because he was the subject of a dispute between Bacău and his former club Astra. Eventually, he became eligible to play and made his Divizia A debut on 7 August 2000 under coach Gheorghe Poenaru, scoring a brace in a 4–3 loss to Steaua București. He finished his first top-flight season with 15 goals, which made him the league's second-highest scorer behind only Dinamo București's Marius Niculae.

In his second season, Cursaru formed an offensive partnership with Cristian Ciocoiu and netted a career-best 17 goals to become the league's top scorer. One of these goals was a scissors kick in a 4–2 victory against Dinamo București, a goal that was selected "Play of the Day" by CNN. At the end of the season, the media reported that German side Hertha Berlin had offered $1.8 million for Cursaru, but Bacău's owner Dumitru Sechelariu asked for $300,000 more, and the negotiations collapsed. To avoid being criticized by Cursaru, Sechelariu raised his wage to $10,000 per month. However, after the transfer failure, the player never regained his form and confidence. In the next three years, he scored only 17 goals in 75 matches. In 2003, he impressed in a trial for the Norwegian side SK Brann, but once again, Sechelariu's demands made the transaction collapse.

In total, Cursaru scored 49 league goals for FCM Bacău over five seasons, eventually departing the club in July 2005 after declining a contract extension.

=== Late career ===
Cursaru signed a two-year contract with Divizia A side FC Vaslui on 11 October 2005, but he failed to impress, scoring no goals during the 2005–06 season. He terminated his contract in late April. Following his unsuccessful spell at Vaslui, he signed with Progresul București in June 2006. Although he played for The Bankers for a year and a half, he was ultimately released due to a low goal-per-match rate; furthermore, the team was relegated at the end of the 2006–07 season. Afterwards, he played in the Romanian lower leagues at Aerostar Bacău, Tricolorul Breaza, Prahova Tomșani and AFC Filipeștii de Pădure, retiring in 2012.

== International career ==
Cursaru played two games for Romania B, making his debut on 22 January 2002 in a 2–1 loss against Greece in which he scored a goal. His second appearance took place on 24 January 2002 in a 2–2 (1–4, after penalty kicks) defeat to Norway. However, he never played for Romania's senior team and on 13 May 2020, Gazeta Sporturilor included him on a list of best Romanian players who never played for the senior national team.

== Club statistics ==
Appearances and goals by club, season and competition
Club	Season	League		Cup		Total	
Club	Season	Apps	Goals	Apps	Goals	Apps	Goals
Bacău	2000–01	26	15	2	1	28	16
Bacău	2001–02	29	17	2	2	31	19
Bacău	2002–03	25	6	3	0	28	6
Bacău	2003–04	27	7	1	0	28	7
Bacău	2004–05	23	4	2	0	25	4
Bacău	Total	130	49	10	3	140	52
Vaslui	2005–06	11	0	1	0	12	0
Vaslui	Total	11	0	1	0	12	0
Progresul	2006–07	26	2	1	1	27	3
Progresul	2007–08	14	3	1	0	15	3
Progresul	Total	40	5	2	1	42	6
Aerostar	2008–09	8	2	0	0	8	2
Aerostar	Total	8	2	0	0	8	2
Breaza	2009–10	7	0	1	0	8	0
Breaza	Total	7	0	1	0	8	0
Career total		196	56	14	4	210	60

== Honours ==
Prahova Tomșani

- Liga IV: 2010–11

Individual

- Divizia A top-scorer: 2001–02
