= Daniel Barna =

Romanian footballer (born 1986)

Personal information
- Full name: Daniel Ionuț Barna
- Date of birth: 22 September 1986 (age 40)
- Place of birth: Piatra Neamț, Romania
- Height: 1.84 m (6 ft 0 in)
- Position: Left back

Youth career
- 2000–2006: Ceahlăul Piatra Neamț

Senior career*
Years	Team	Apps	(Gls)
2006–2013	Ceahlăul Piatra Neamț	109	(4)
2011	→ Rapid Ghidighici (loan)	7	(1)
2014	Farul Constanța	14	(0)
2014–2015	FC Brașov	6	(0)
2015	Farul Constanța	16	(0)
2016	Voluntari	11	(0)
2016	Dunărea Călărași	10	(0)
2017	FC Pipinsried	12	(1)
2017–2018	Oberweikertshofen	21	(3)
Total		206	(9)

International career
2007–2009	Romania U21	3	(0)
- * Club domestic league appearances and goals

Daniel Ionuț Barna (born 22 September 1986) is a Romanian former professional footballer who played as a left-back.

== Career ==
Barna started his football career in the academy of Ceahlăul Piatra Neamț. After progressing through the ranks, he was eventually promoted to the first team. Barna went on to make over 100 appearances for the club between 2006 and 2013. During his time at Ceahlăul Piatra Neamț, he was loaned out to Moldovan club Rapid Ghidighici in 2011. After leaving Ceahlăul Piatra Neamț in 2013, Barna played for several Romanian clubs, including Farul Constanța, FC Brașov, Voluntari and Dunărea Călărași during shirt spells between 2014 and 2016.

In March 2017, Barna moved to German Bayernliga club FC Pipinsried, before joining SC Oberweikertshofen in August of the same year.
