= Vasile Avădanei =

Romanian footballer

Personal information
- Full name: Vasile Valentin Avădanei
- Date of birth: 30 December 1979 (age 46)
- Place of birth: Târgu Neamț, România
- Height: 1.84 m (6 ft 0 in)
- Position: Defender

Team information
- Current team: Ceahlăul Piatra Neamț (head coach)

Senior career*
Years	Team	Apps	(Gls)
1999–2000	Termoutilaj Piatra Neamț		
2000–2007	Ceahlăul Piatra Neamț	114	(1)
Total		114	(1)

Managerial career
- 2008–2011: Ceahlăul II Piatra Neamț (assistant)
- 2011: Cetatea Târgu Neamț
- 2011–2013: Ceahlăul II Piatra Neamț (assistant)
- 2013–2015: Petrotub Roman
- 2015: Ceahlăul II Piatra Neamț (assistant)
- 2015: Ceahlăul II Piatra Neamț
- 2015–2016: Cetatea Târgu Neamț (assistant)
- 2016–2021: Ceahlăul Piatra Neamț (youth)
- 2021–: Ceahlăul Piatra Neamț (assistant)
- 2025: Ceahlăul Piatra Neamț (caretaker)
- 2026–: Ceahlăul Piatra Neamț (caretaker)
- * Club domestic league appearances and goals

Vasile Valentin Avădanei (born 30 December 1979) is a Romanian former professional footballer who played as a defender, currently in charge at Liga III club Ceahlăul Piatra Neamț.

== Honours ==
=== Player ===
Ceahlăul Piatra Neamț

- Divizia B: 2005–06
