= Nemțeanu =

Nemțeanu is a Romanian surname derived from the nickname "Nemeț", 'German person'. Notable people with the surname include:

- Barbu Nemțeanu, Romanian poet, humorist and translator
- Iulius Nemțeanu (born 1957), Romanian footballer

== See also ==
- Nemțanu
