= Radu Lefter =

Romanian footballer

Personal information
- Full name: Radu Gabriel Lefter
- Date of birth: 17 February 1970 (age 56)
- Place of birth: Bacău, Romania
- Height: 1.85 m (6 ft 1 in)
- Position: Goalkeeper

Youth career
- 1977–1982: Letea Bacău
- 1982–1992: LPS Bacău

Senior career*
Years	Team	Apps	(Gls)
1992–2004	Ceahlăul Piatra Neamț	229	(0)

Managerial career
- 2008–2016: Ceahlăul Piatra Neamț (GK coach)
- 2016: Rapid București (assistant)
- 2016–2017: Al-Taawoun (GK coach)
- 2017: Al-Fayha (GK coach)
- * Club domestic league appearances and goals as of 5 December 2017

Radu Gabriel Lefter (born 17 February 1970) is a Romanian former professional footballer who played as a goalkeeper. Lefter played all his career for Ceahlăul Piatra Neamț, becoming a legendary player of this club.
