= Alexandru Forminte =

Romanian footballer

Personal information
- Full name: Alexandru Gheorghe Forminte
- Date of birth: 19 September 1982 (age 44)
- Place of birth: Piatra Neamţ, România
- Height: 1.84 m (6 ft 0 in)
- Position: Centre back

Senior career*
Years	Team	Apps	(Gls)
2000–2012	Ceahlăul Piatra Neamţ	247	(13)
2013–2014	Dunărea Galați	0	(0)
2014–2015	Callatis Mangalia	?	(?)
Total		247+	(13+)
- * Club domestic league appearances and goals as of 5 December 2017

Alexandru Gheorghe Forminte (born 19 September 1982 in Piatra Neamţ) is a Romanian former football player. He played as a centre back.
