= Marian Purică =

Romanian footballer

Personal information
- Full name: Marian Iordache Purică
- Date of birth: 5 December 1978 (age 47)
- Place of birth: Buhuși, Romania
- Height: 1.69 m (5 ft 7 in)
- Position: Full-back

Senior career*
Years	Team	Apps	(Gls)
1996–1997	Textila Buhuși	?	(?)
1997–2007	Ceahlăul Piatra Neamț	190	(16)
2007	Aerostar Bacău	?	(?)
2008	FCM Câmpina	1	(0)
2008–2009	Săgeata Stejaru	?	(?)
2009–2010	Viitorul Ianca	?	(?)
2010–2014	Rivanazzano Terme	?	(?)
Total		191+	(16+)
- * Club domestic league appearances and goals as of 26 February 2018

Marian Iordache Purică (born 5 December 1978) is a Romanian former professional footballer who played as a full-back. He played 10 years for Ceahlăul in 190 matches and scored 16 goals. After that he played mainly at Liga III and in Italy for lower leagues team Rivanazzano Terme.

== Honours ==
Ceahlăul Piatra Neamț

- Divizia B: 2005–06
