= Andrei Marc =

Romanian footballer

Personal information
- Full name: Andrei Ovidiu Marc
- Date of birth: 29 April 1993 (age 33)
- Place of birth: Piatra Neamț, Romania
- Height: 1.89 m (6 ft 2 in)
- Position: Centre-back

Team information
- Current team: Ceahlăul Piatra Neamț
- Number: 44

Youth career
- 1999–2008: Ceahlăul Piatra Neamț

Senior career*
| Years | Team | Apps | (Gls) |
| 2009–2014 | Ceahlăul Piatra Neamț | 71 | (3) |
| 2015–2016 | Dinamo București | 37 | (2) |
| 2016–2017 | Şanlıurfaspor | 18 | (0) |
| 2017–2022 | Concordia Chiajna | 116 | (11) |
| 2019 | → FCSB (loan) | 2 | (0) |
| 2022–2023 | FC Brașov | 17 | (1) |
| 2023–2024 | Chindia Târgoviște | 18 | (1) |
| 2024–2025 | Concordia Chiajna | 20 | (4) |
| 2025– | Ceahlăul Piatra Neamț | 21 | (3) |

International career
| 2010–2011 | Romania U17 | 3 | (0) |
| 2011–2012 | Romania U19 | 1 | (0) |
| 2013 | Romania U21 | 2 | (0) |
- * Club domestic league appearances and goals as of 25 April 2026

Andrei Ovidiu Marc (born 29 April 1993) is a Romanian professional footballer who plays as a centre-back for Liga III club Ceahlăul Piatra Neamț, which he captains.

== International career ==
From 2010 to 2011, Marc was a member of the Romania national under-17 football team.

== Personal life ==
His father, Ovidiu was also a footballer and spent most of his career at Ceahlăul Piatra Neamț scoring 48 goals in 186 Divizia A matches.

== Honours ==
Ceahlăul Piatra Neamț

- Liga II: 2010–11

Dinamo București

- Cupa României runner-up: 2015–16
