= Marius Rusu =

Romanian footballer

Personal information
- Full name: Marius Ștefan Rusu
- Date of birth: 22 February 1990 (age 36)
- Place of birth: Constanța, Romania
- Height: 1.75 m (5 ft 9 in)
- Position: Right back

Senior career*
Years	Team	Apps	(Gls)
2010–2012	Viitorul Constanța	24	(2)
2012–2015	Ceahlăul Piatra Neamţ	30	(1)
2015	Farul Constanța	14	(0)
2016	Berceni	13	(0)
2017–2019	Ceahlăul Piatra Neamț		
- * Club domestic league appearances and goals as of 19 July 2017

Marius Rusu (born 22 February 1990) is a Romanian footballer.
