= Buhuși =

- Town
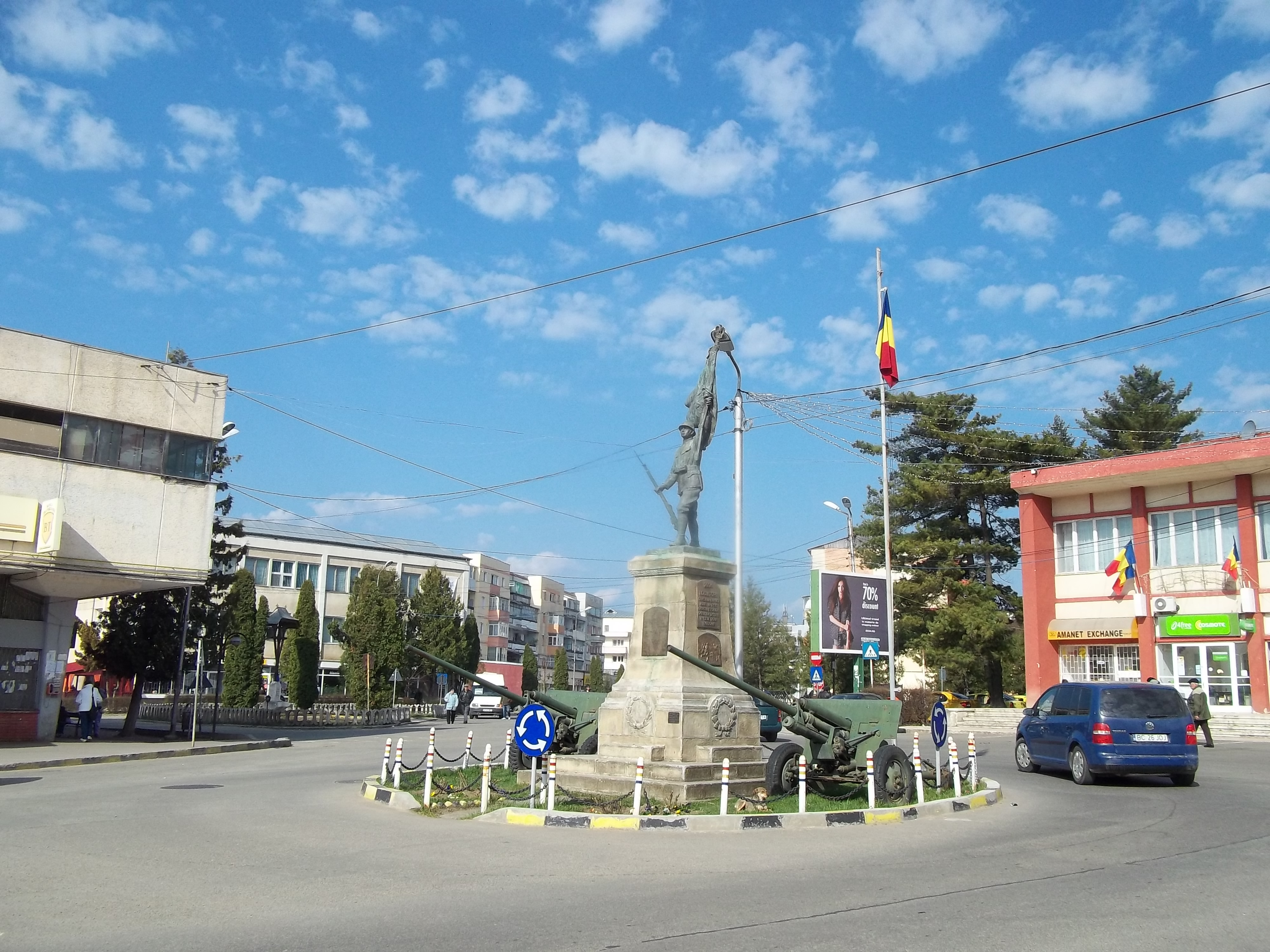
- World War I heroes monument

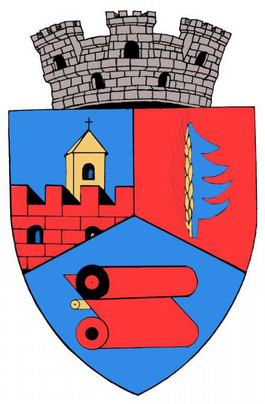
- Coat of arms

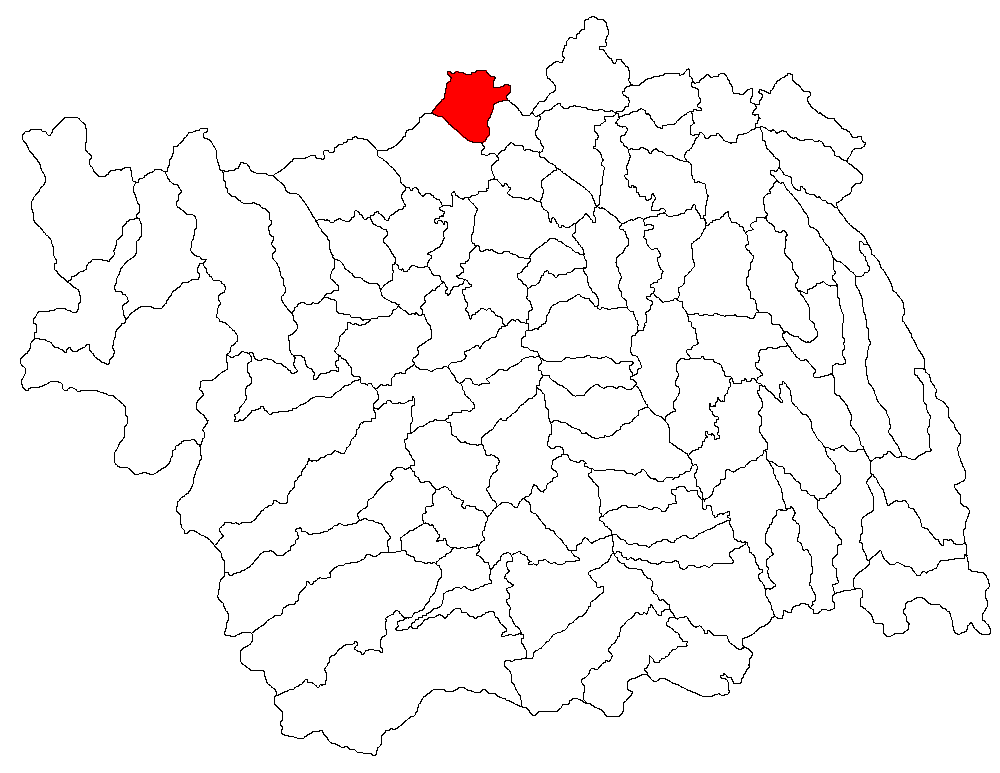
- Location in Bacău County

- Location in Romania
- Coordinates: 46°42′54″N 26°42′15″E
- Country: Romania
- County: Bacău

Government
  - Mayor (2024–2028): Vasile Zaharia (PSD)
- Area: 39.86 km^{2} (15.39 sq mi)
- Elevation: 235 m (771 ft)
- Population (2021-12-01): 14,152
  - Density: 355.0/km^{2} (919.6/sq mi)
- Time zone: UTC+02:00 (EET)
  - Summer (DST): UTC+03:00 (EEST)
- Postal code: 605100
- Area code: (+40) 02 34
- Vehicle reg.: BC
- Website: www.primariabuhusi.ro

Buhuși (Romanian pronunciation: [buˈhuʃʲ]; Hungarian: Buhus; Yiddish: באהוש, romanized: Bohush) is a town in Bacău County, Romania with a population of 14,152 as of 2021. It was first mentioned in the 15th century when it was named "Bodești" and was a property of an important family of Boyars named "Buhuș".

Historical population
Year	Pop.	±%
1930	8,655	—
1948	8,198	−5.3%
1956	12,382	+51.0%
1966	15,341	+23.9%
1977	20,148	+31.3%
1992	21,621	+7.3%
2002	21,993	+1.7%
2011	14,562	−33.8%
2021	14,152	−2.8%
Source: Census data

The town had the biggest textile factory in south-eastern Europe. But the factory has drastically reduced its capabilities after 1989 and currently employs less than 200 workers. The Runc Monastery (built in 1457), located near Buhuși, is one of the famous monasteries built by Stephen the Great of Moldavia in Moldavia during the Ottoman Wars in the 15th century.

Buhuși has five primary schools and one high school, the Ion Borcea Technical College. The town administers two villages, Marginea and Runcu.

== Jewish community ==
Rabbi Yitzchok Friedman, son of Rabbi Yisrael Friedman of Ruzhin, founded the Bohush Hasidic dynasty here in the mid-nineteenth century. The dynasty moved to Tel Aviv, Israel, in 1951.

== Notable residents ==
- Elisabeta Bostan (born 1931), film director and screenwriter
- Dumitru Dan (1890–1978), geographer, professor of geography, and globe-trotter
- Yisrael Friedman (1923–2017), rabbi
- Mircea Grosaru (1952–2014), politician
- Marian Purică (born 1978), football player
- Mihail Roller (1908–1958), communist activist, historian, and propagandist
- Moshe Sharoni (1929–2020), Israeli politician

== Gallery ==
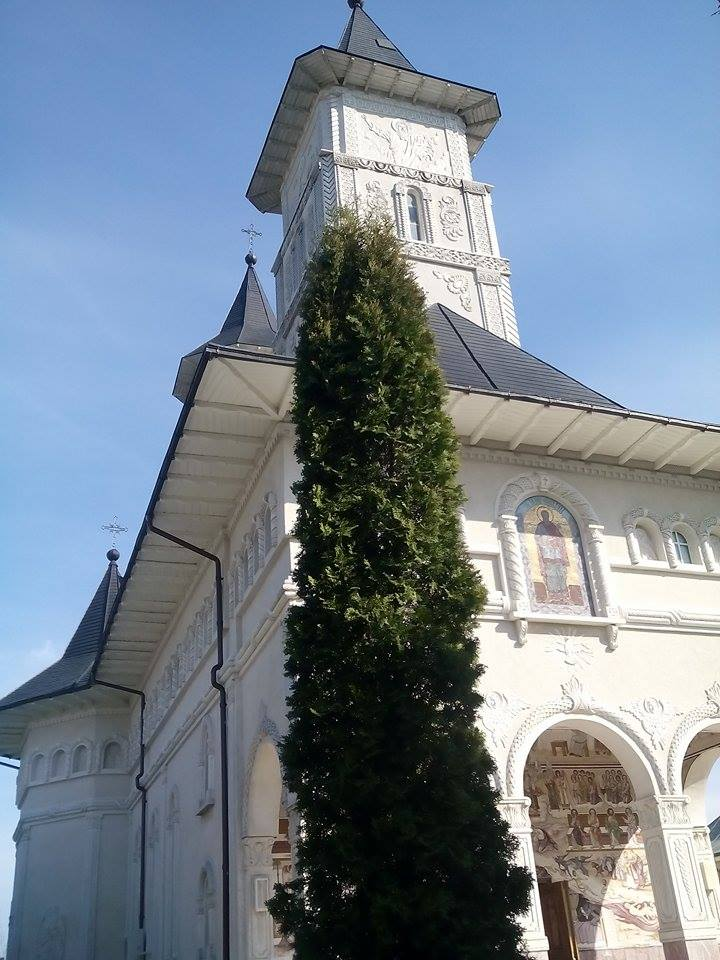
Ciolpani Monastery

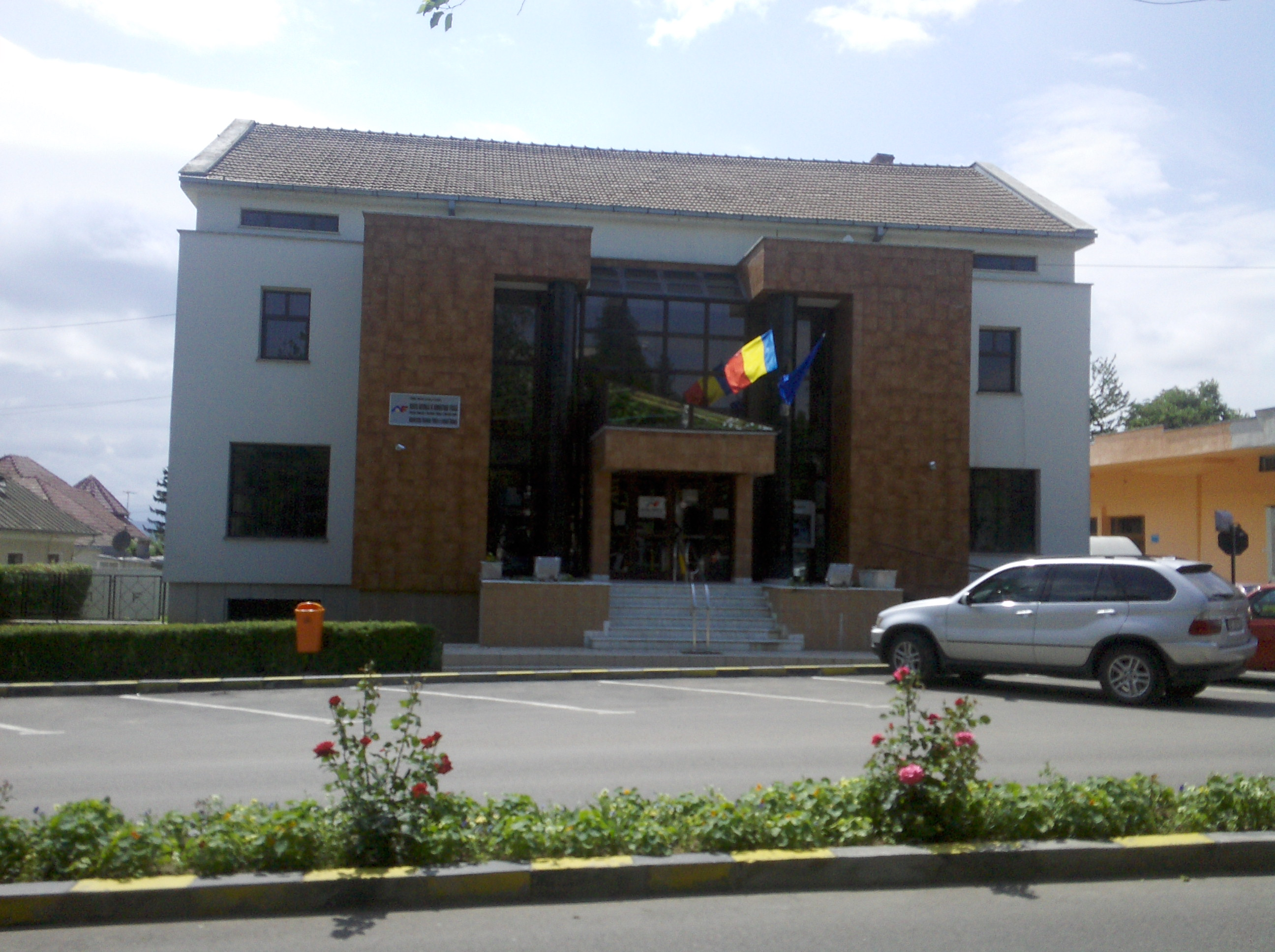
Financial administration building

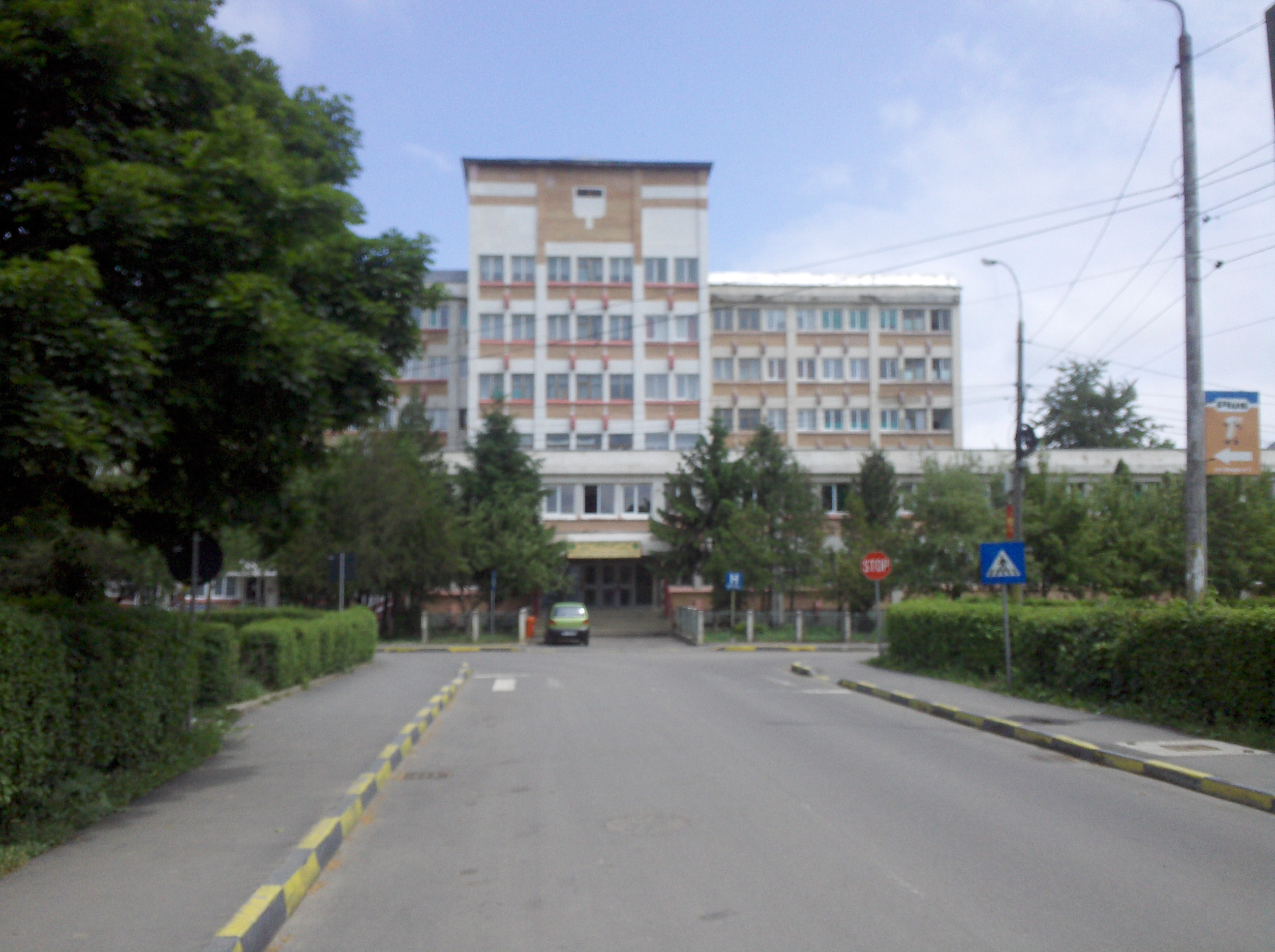
Buhuși hospital

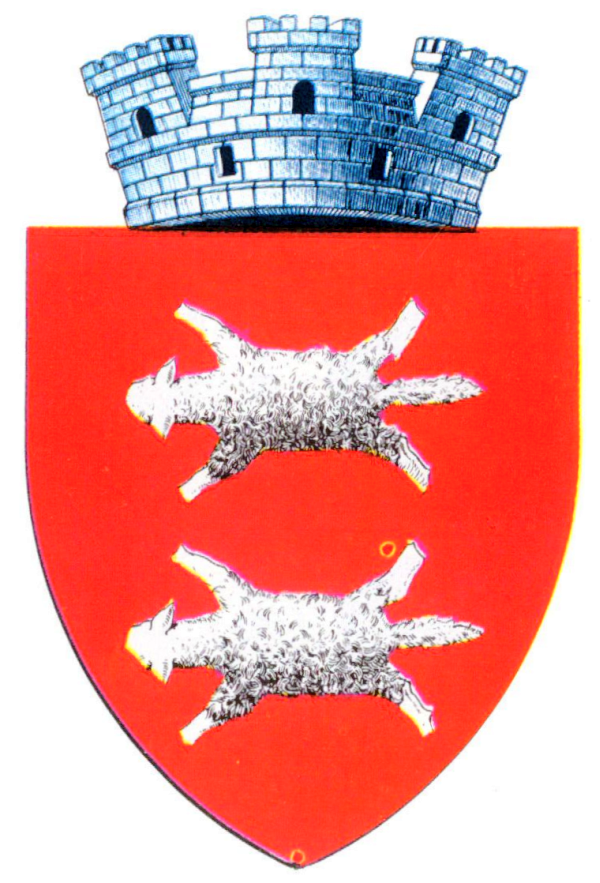
Interbellic coat of arms
