= Adrian Solomon =

Romanian footballer

Personal information
- Full name: Adrian Constantin Solomon
- Date of birth: 28 April 1974 (age 52)
- Place of birth: Piatra Neamț, Romania
- Height: 1.85 m (6 ft 1 in)
- Positions: Central midfielder; left midfielder

Youth career
- Juventus Piatra Neamț
- Melania Săvinești

Senior career*
Years	Team	Apps	(Gls)
1995–2005	Ceahlăul Piatra Neamț	232	(27)
- * Club domestic league appearances and goals

Adrian Constantin Solomon (born 28 April 1974) is a Romanian former football midfielder who spent his entire career at Ceahlăul Piatra Neamț.
