= Florin Axinia =

Romanian former professional footballer

Personal information
- Full name: Florin Vasile Axinia
- Date of birth: 28 January 1974 (age 52)
- Place of birth: Piatra Neamț, Romania
- Height: 1.67 m (5 ft 6 in)
- Position: Striker

Youth career
- 1984–1992: CSŞ Olimpia Piatra Neamț

Senior career*
Years	Team	Apps	(Gls)
1992–1997	Ceahlăul Piatra Neamț (Note: The statistics for the 1992–93 Divizia B season are unavailable.)	129	(45)
1998	Național București	20	(5)
1999–2005	Ceahlăul Piatra Neamț	164	(37)
Total		313	(87)
- * Club domestic league appearances and goals as of 26 February 2018

Florin Vasile Axinia (also known as Florin Axinia II, born 28 January 1974) is a Romanian former professional footballer who played as a striker. Except for two halves of seasons played at Național București, Axinia played all his career for Ceahlăul Piatra Neamț, for which he scored 82 goals in 293 matches, ensuring his presence in the club's hall of fame. Axinia is the all-time goalscorer of Ceahlăul and also was the captain of the team in 72 matches. His brother Gheorghe Axinia was also a footballer, they played together at Ceahlăul Piatra Neamț. In 2006, Gelu Crăcană, a fan of Ceahlăul Piatra Neamț created a 420-square-meter (500 including the sleeves) Ceahlăul Piatra Neamț jersey shirt with Florin Axinia's name on it which entered the Guinness World Records Hall of fame. In 2008 Axinia suffered a stroke, but after which he fully recovered.

== Honours ==
Ceahlăul Piatra Neamț

- Divizia B: 1992–93
