= Stadionul Cetatea =

Multi-purpose stadium in Romania

- Interactive map of Stadionul Cetatea
- Address: Str. 1 Decembrie 1918
- Location: Târgu Neamț, Romania
- Coordinates: 47°12′36.3″N 26°20′37.1″E
- Owner: Municipality of Târgu Neamț
- Capacity: 2,000
- Surface: Grass

Tenants
- Ozana Târgu Neamț (1974–1997, 2006–2016, 2018–2020); Bradu Borca (2020–2021)

Stadionul Cetatea is a multi-purpose stadium in Târgu Neamț, Romania founded in 1960. It is currently used mostly for football matches. In the past, the stadium was the home ground of Ozana Târgu Neamț. The stadium holds 2,000 people.
