= Lucian Covrig =

Romanian footballer

Personal information
- Full name: Lucian Ioan Covrig
- Date of birth: 3 May 1977 (age 49)
- Place of birth: Piatra Neamț, Romania
- Height: 1.84 m (6 ft 0 in)
- Position: Goalkeeper

Youth career
- Ceahlăul Piatra Neamț

Senior career*
Years	Team	Apps	(Gls)
1996–1998	Ceahlăul Piatra Neamț	14	(0)
1999	→ Cimentul Bicaz (loan)	?	(?)
2000–2006	Farul Constanța	14	(0)
2008–2009	Ceahlăul Piatra Neamț	88	(0)
2006–2008	Leonard Pașcani	?	(?)
2008–2009	Ceahlăul Piatra Neamț	0	(0)
Total		116	(0)
- * Club domestic league appearances and goals as of 26 February 2018

Lucian Ioan "Uțu" Covrig (also known as Ionuț Covrig; born 3 May 1977), is a Romanian former professional footballer who played as a goalkeeper. Covrig first match in the Liga I was Ceahlăul Piatra Neamț-Universitatea Cluj 3–1 on 7 June 1997.
