= CSO Buhuși =

Romanian football team

- Full name: Clubul Sportiv Orășenesc Buhuși
- Short name: Buhuși
- Founded: 1927; 99 years ago as Amateur Buhuși; 2007; 19 years ago as ASO Buhuși
- Ground: Orășenesc
- Capacity: 3,000
- Owner: Buhuși Town
- League: Liga IV

Clubul Sportiv Orășenesc Buhuși is a Romanian football team from Buhuși, Bacău County. The team represents the football section of the multi-sport club CSO Buhuși, which also include handball, chess, tennis and table tennis sections. CSO Buhuși has no senior football squads registered to play in any Romanian Football Federation competition, and is kept alive only by youth squads.

== History ==
The club was founded in 1927 as Amateur Buhuși, playing in the district and regional leagues. Between 1930 and 1934, the team changed its name to Steaua Bistriței Buhuși, changing it again, in 1934, to Textila, a name it would carry until 1950, when the team would be called Flamura Roșie, returning to the name Textila in 1957.

The club was re-established in 2007 as ASO Buhuși by Toader Șteț and Adrian Păduraru, with financial support of the Buhuși City Hall and Buhuși Local Council in order to try to ensure the continuity of the football tradition in Buhuși after Textila Buhuși was dissolved, a club with tradition in Romanian football.

In 2010, ASO Buhuși dissolved its senior squad maintaining alive only the youth squads and reformed as CSO Buhuși.

== Honours ==
Liga III

- Runners-up (4): 1948–49, 1964–65, 1990–91, 1991–92

Liga IV – Bacău County

- Winners (2): 1978–79, 1983–84

Bacău Regional Championship

- Winners (2): 1953, 1961–62

== League history ==
Season	Tier	Division	Place	Cupa României
2009–10	4	Liga IV (BC)	8th	County phase
2008–09	4	Liga IV (BC)	13th	County phase
2007–08	5	Liga V (BC)	4th	County phase

== Notable former players ==
The footballers mentioned below have played at least 1 season for CSO Buhuși and also played in Liga I for another team.

- (Romania) Marian Purică
- (Romania) Stelian Bordeianu
- (Romania) Gheorghe Axinia

== Former managers ==
- Gheorghe Chivorchian (1983–1988)
- Toader Șteț
