= Mihai Nemțanu =

Romanian footballer

Personal information
- Date of birth: 15 March 1979 (age 47)
- Place of birth: Piatra Neamț, Romania
- Height: 1.79 m (5 ft 10 in)
- Position: Forward

Youth career
- Ceahlăul Piatra Neamț

Senior career*
Years	Team	Apps	(Gls)
1996–2006	Ceahlăul Piatra Neamț	153	(21)

International career
1996–1997	Romania U18	12	(0)
2000	Romania U21	5	(0)
- * Club domestic league appearances and goals

Mihai Nemțanu (born 15 March 1979) is a Romanian former footballer who played as a forward.

== Honours ==
Ceahlăul Piatra Neamț

- Divizia B: 2005–06
