= Franck Meyrignac =

French footballer (born 1970)

Personal information
- Date of birth: 27 September 1970 (age 56)
- Place of birth: Orléans, France
- Height: 1.78 m (5 ft 10 in)
- Position: Defender

Senior career*
Years	Team	Apps	(Gls)
1987–1992	Orléans		
1992–1996	Metz		
- * Club domestic league appearances and goals

Franck Meyrignac (born 27 September 1970) is a French former football defender.
