= Icușești =

- Commune
- Location in Neamț County

- Location in Romania
- Coordinates: 46°48′N 26°56′E
- Country: Romania
- County: Neamț

Government
  - Mayor (2020–2024): Marius-Vasile Minică (PNL)
- Area: 64.28 km^{2} (24.82 sq mi)
- Elevation: 194 m (636 ft)
- Population (2021-12-01): 3,715
  - Density: 57.79/km^{2} (149.7/sq mi)
- Time zone: UTC+02:00 (EET)
  - Summer (DST): UTC+03:00 (EEST)
- Postal code: 617250
- Area code: +(40) 233
- Vehicle reg.: NT
- Website: comunaicusesti.ro

Icușești is a commune in Neamț County, Western Moldavia, Romania. It is composed of seven villages: Bălușești, Bătrânești, Icușești, Mesteacăn, Rocna, Spiridonești, and Tabăra.

Historical population
Year	Pop.	±%
1992	4,413	—
2002	4,677	+6.0%
2011	3,952	−15.5%
2021	3,715	−6.0%
Source: Census data

== Natives ==
- Vasile Șoiman (born 1960), footballer
