= Florin Marin =

Romanian footballer (1953–2025)

Personal information
- Date of birth: 19 May 1953
- Place of birth: Bucharest, Romania
- Date of death: 18 September 2025 (aged 72)
- Place of death: Bucharest, Romania
- Height: 1.87 m (6 ft 2 in)
- Position: Defender

Youth career
- 1966–1972: Rapid București

Senior career*
Years	Team	Apps	(Gls)
1972–1976	Rapid București	102	(0)
1976–1984	Steaua București	174	(3)
1984–1985	Argeș Pitești	10	(0)
1985–1986	Gloria Buzău	23	(0)
1986–1987	Inter Sibiu	15	(1)
Total		324	(4)

International career
1973–1975	Romania U21	5	(0)

Managerial career
- 1991–1992: Rapid București (assistant)
- 1992–1994: Farul Constanța
- 1995–1996: Farul Constanța
- 1996–1997: Ceahlăul Piatra Neamț
- 1997: Ceahlăul Piatra Neamț
- 1997–1998: Național București
- 1999: Farul Constanța
- 1999–2000: Rocar București
- 2000: Universitatea Craiova (caretaker)
- 2001: Ceahlăul Piatra Neamț
- 2001: Ceahlăul Piatra Neamț
- 2001–2002: Universitatea Craiova
- 2002: Dinamo București
- 2002–2003: Astra Ploiești
- 2003–2004: Petrolul Ploiești
- 2005: Ceahlăul Piatra Neamț
- 2005–2006: Romania U21
- 2006: Dinamo București
- 2006: Jiul Petroșani
- 2006–2007: Ceahlăul Piatra Neamț
- 2007: Dacia Mioveni
- 2008–2009: Ceahlăul Piatra Neamț
- 2010: Steaua București (assistant)
- 2010–2011: Universitatea Craiova (assistant)
- 2011–2014: Romania (assistant)
- 2014: Astra Giurgiu
- 2014: Ceahlăul Piatra Neamț (president)
- 2014: Ceahlăul Piatra Neamț
- 2015: Oțelul Galați
- 2015: Rapid București
- 2015–2016: ACS Poli Timișoara
- 2016–2017: Voluntari (technical director)
- 2017: Mioveni (technical director)
- 2017: Mioveni
- 2022–2023: Dinamo București (technical director)
- 2024: Voluntari (technical counselor)
- 2024: Voluntari
- * Club domestic league appearances and goals

Florin Marin (19 May 1953 – 18 September 2025) was a Romanian professional football manager and player. Marin had a total of 456 matches as a manager in the Romanian top-division, Divizia A consisting of 166 victories, 103 draws and 187 losses. Marin died from complications of dementia on 18 September 2025, at the age of 72.

== Honours ==
=== Player ===
Rapid București

- Divizia B: 1974–75
- Cupa României: 1974–75

Steaua București

- Divizia A: 1977–78
- Cupa României: 1978–79

Argeș Pitești

- Balkans Cup runner-up: 1984–85

=== Coach ===
Ceahlăul Piatra Neamț

- Liga II: 2008–09
