= Dumitru Dan =

Romanian geographer (1890–1978)

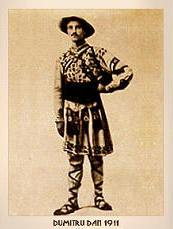
Globe-trotter Dumitru Dan, in Romanian national costume, 1911

Dumitru (Demetre) Dan (14 July 1890 – 4 December 1978) was a Romanian geographer, professor of geography, and globe-trotter. He was best known for his fabricated tale about walking around the world.

== Dan's around the world tale ==
According to Dan, in 1908, the Touring club de France announced a contest for walking around the world, with an offered prize of 100,000 francs. Dumitru Dan and his countrymen Paul Pârvu, George Negreanu and Alexandru Pascu were all students in Paris at the time, and they decided to take up the challenge, using their own money and resources.

The group returned to Romania to prepare, learning additional languages, studying cartography, and doing weight training and exercises for two hours a day. They walked 45 km per day, travelling through plains, hills and mountains in all seasons. They learned Romanian folk songs and dances and how to play the flute and accordion so that they could support their endeavor along the way by performing their native folklore.

In 1910, the group set out on their voyage with a dog, Harap, wearing native garb and walking in sandals. Much of the route was covered between 1910 and 1916, but Dan claimed his companions did not survive until the trip's completion in 1923.

=== Death of fellow travelers ===
On 17 July 1911, in India, the group were invited to the palace of the Rajah of Bombay. After sharing a meal there, the walkers went in group to purchase supplies for their journey in town. Alexandru Pascu remained to tell the Rajah about their adventures to that point. His companions returned to find Pascu and their hosts had indulged in and passed out from opium. Although their hosts felt Pascu would likely recover, he never woke. He died as a result of opium poisoning and was buried in India.

George Negreanu died two years into the voyage, when the then trio were crossing a narrow mountain pass in the Nanling Mountains in China. In a brief rain during which they were forced to feel their way with canes, Negreanu - at the head of the group - fell onto rocks from a sharp precipice. Dan and Pârvu carried him to a local settlement and then to a hospital but there was no doctor available there to assist. By the time medical care was found, Negreanu was dead.

Pârvu found himself unable to continue in Jacksonville, Florida. Several years earlier, he had wounded his legs during the more than 2600 km walk across Alaska (coming from China and Siberian Russia) on the route Kotzebue, Fairbanks, Anchorage, Yakutat, Gustavus, Skagway and Juneau, and he developed gangrene. Advised by doctors to stop, he remained in Florida with the dog Harap. Subsequently, both of his legs were amputated, but it was not sufficient to save him. In May 1915, he died. (Sadly, all this was false, see "Controversy" section.)

=== Delay ===
Dumitru Dan was forced to put his trip on hold due to the outbreak of World War I, but he completed his voyage by 1923. The value of the prize was substantially diminished, given inflation over 15 years and from the War. According to a 2011 Romanian news article, it had been worth about 500,000 Euros in 1908, but was only worth 40,000 at the time it was awarded. He crossed five continents over three oceans, through 76 countries and over 1,500 cities, wearing out 497 pairs of shoes.

== Controversy ==
Research has shown that Dumitru Dan’s version of his walk told late in life during the 1960s and 1970s was fabricated and did not match the account he told to newspapers in 1914 while he was walking in the United States. He instead said he started his walk in 1912, not 1910, with no mention of a race. He said he had only walked in Europe thus far and said in 1913 he served in the Balkan War where he was seriously wounded. He had not been to Africa, Asia, South and Central America, Australia, Russia, and Alaska as he claimed later in life. He instead said in 1914 that he took up the walk again that year after recovering from war wounds. His walking in 1914 was the first year with proof of photographs, newspaper articles, and certificates.

In 1914–15 he walked in England and Scotland, America, the Caribbean, and finally in Spain. Paul Parvu did not walk with him 60,000 miles from Romania. Parvu was from Cleveland, Ohio, where Dan met him for the first time in 1914. There was no dog involved. They walked together for only three months. Parvu did not wound his legs in Alaska, and did not die in Florida. After walking in Washington D.C., Parvu returned to Ohio and lived on for many years. In 1914–15, Dan never mentioned to reporters a race involving the Touring Club of France. No evidence has ever been found about a race involving 200 international participants. Dan said in 1914 he was walking on wager. It is estimated that Dan actually only walked only about 3,000 miles total, but for some reason added to his story later in life.

== Legacy and later life ==
Dan died in Buzău, Romania in 1978. He is buried in the Heroes' Cemetery. In 1985, his false record was entered into the Guinness Book, never verified at that time, and later removed.

== See also ==
- List of pedestrian circumnavigators
