= Dragomirești, Neamț =

Dragomirești
- Commune
- Location in Neamț County

- Location in Romania
- Coordinates: 47.0211°N 26.5778°E
- Country: Romania
- County: Neamț

Government
  - Mayor (2024–2028): Ion Ioniță (PNL)
- Area: 32.5 km^{2} (12.5 sq mi)
- Elevation: 354 m (1,161 ft)
- Population (2021-12-01): 2,030
  - Density: 62.5/km^{2} (162/sq mi)
- Time zone: UTC+02:00 (EET)
  - Summer (DST): UTC+03:00 (EEST)
- Postal code: 617165
- Area code: +(40) 233
- Vehicle reg.: NT
- Website: www.dragomiresti.ro

Dragomirești is a commune in Neamț County, Western Moldavia, Romania. It is composed of six villages: Borniș, Dragomirești, Hlăpești, Mastacăn, Unghi, and Vad.

Historical population
Year	Pop.	±%
1992	2,387	—
2002	2,421	+1.4%
2011	2,231	−7.8%
2021	2,030	−9.0%
Source: Census data
