= FC Ozana Târgu Neamț =

Romanian association football club

Ozana Târgu Neamț
- Full name: Fotbal Club Ozana Târgu Neamț
- Short name: FC Ozana
- Founded: 1974 as Ozana Târgu Neamț; 2006 as Cetatea Târgu Neamț; 2018 as Ozana Târgu Neamț
- Dissolved: 2020
- Ground: Cetatea
- Capacity: 2,000
Home colours	Away colours	Third colours

Fotbal Club Ozana Târgu Neamț, commonly known as FC Ozana Târgu Neamț, or simply as Ozana Târgu Neamț, was a Romanian football club based in Târgu Neamț, Neamț County that last time played in the Liga III.

== History ==
Ozana Târgu Neamț was founded in 1974 and began competing in the Neamț County Championship. After only one year was promoted in Divizia C winning the county championship and promotion play-off against champion of Vaslui County, Avântul Huși ( 2–0 at Huși and 2–1 at Târgu Neamț). The squad of Ozana in the first season was composed of: Floș, Constantinescu — goalkeepers; Croitoru II, Pasat, Axinte, Fodor, Gavriluță — defenders; Meterciuc, Croitoru I, Dascălu, Roman, Dumitraș — midfielders; Ionașcu, Anegroaie, Tulbure, Doru Apetrei, Hritcu — strikers; Mircea Crețu (head coach).

At the end of the season, the newly promoted team would finish in 12th place. In the 1976/1977 season the name of the team would change, and Ozana Târgu Neamț would turn into Cetatea Târgu Neamț. After 18 seasons played in the third stage of the Romanian Championship, Cetatea Târgu Neamț promoted in Divizia B. The season 1994/1995 was to be the brightest year for the team, occupying the fourth place in Divizia B, coming from the position of newly promoted.

Two years later, things were changing, and valuable players starting to leave, seeing the team being relegated to Divizia C. A year later, in 1997, Cetatea Târgu Neamț would be disbanded and Târgu Neamț would be left without the football team.

After a 9-year break Cetatea Târgu Neamț is re-established. From the first season it finished first in Liga IV – Neamț County, with only two defeats that season. After 10 years of waiting, "the white-and-blue men" would return to the third league. In 2016, the club is disbanded for the second time.

In 2018, the club was reestablished under the name of FC Ozana Târgu Neamț by Andrei Isache, Laurențiu Pavel and Cosmin Bocaneț (founding members).

After only one season the team won Liga IV – Neamț County and they promoted to Liga III after a play-off match against Viitorul Liteni, Suceava County.

== Chronology of names ==
Name	Period
Ozana Târgu Neamț	1974–1976
Cetatea Târgu Neamț	1976–2016
Ozana Târgu Neamț	2018–2020

== Honours ==
Liga III:

- Winners (1): 1993–94

Liga IV – Neamț County

- Winners (5): 1974–75, 1998–99, 2006–07, 2012–13, 2018–19
- Runners-up (1): 1997–98

== League history ==
Season	Tier	Division	Place	Notes	Cupa României
2019–20	3	Liga III (Seria I)	8th	Withdrew	
2018–19	4	Liga IV (NT)	1st (C)	Promoted	
2016–18	Not active				
2015–16	3	Liga III (Seria I)	14th	Relegated	Fourth round
2014–15	3	Liga III (Seria I)	8th		Fifth Round
2013–14	3	Liga III (Seria I)	5th		
2012–13	4	Liga IV (NT)	1st (C)	Promoted	
2011–12	3	Liga III (Seria I)	14th	Relegated	
2010–11	3	Liga III (Seria I)	11th		
2009–10	3	Liga III (Seria I)	9th		
2008–09	3	Liga III (Seria I)	12th		
2007–08	3	Liga III (Seria I)	10th		
2006–07	4	Liga IV (NT)	1st (C)	Promoted	
1999–06	Not active				
1998–99	4	Liga IV (NT)	1st (C)	Promoted	
1997–98	4	Liga IV (NT)	2nd		
1996–97	2	Divizia B (Seria I)	17th	Relegated	
1995–96	2	Divizia B (Seria I)	15th		
1994–95	2	Divizia B (Seria I)	4th		

Season	Tier	Division	Place	Notes	Cupa României
1993–94	3	Divizia C (Seria I)	1st (C)	Promoted	Round of 32
1992–93	3	Divizia C (Seria I)	10th		
1991–92	3	Divizia C (Seria II)	3rd		
1990–91	3	Divizia C (Seria IX)	11th		
1989–90	3	Divizia C (Seria XII)	14th		
1988–89	3	Divizia C (Seria I)	4th		
1987–88	3	Divizia C (Seria I)	5th		
1986–87	3	Divizia C (Seria I)	6th		
1985–86	3	Divizia C (Seria I)	5th		
1984–85	3	Divizia C (Seria I)	8th		
1983–84	3	Divizia C (Seria I)	10th		
1982–83	3	Divizia C (Seria I)	11th		
1981–82	3	Divizia C (Seria I)	14th		
1980–81	3	Divizia C (Seria I)	11th		
1979–80	3	Divizia C (Seria I)	8th		
1978–79	3	Divizia C (Seria II)	14th		
1977–78	3	Divizia C (Seria I)	8th		
1976–77	3	Divizia C (Seria I)	11th		Round of 32
1975–76	3	Divizia C (Seria II)	12th		
1974–75	4	Divizia D (NT)	1st (C)	Promoted	

== Former managers ==
- (Romania) Vasile Avădanei (2011)
- (Romania) Ovidiu Marc (2012–2013)
- (Romania) Ciprian Danciu (2014)
- (Romania) Ovidiu Marc (2018)
