= 1992–93 Divizia B =

Divizia B
- Season: 1992–93
- Promoted: Ceahlăul Piatra Neamț; UTA Arad
- Relegated: Olt 90 Scornicești; Metalurgistul Cugir; Unirea Slobozia; Olimpia Satu Mare
- Top goalscorer: Constantin Barbu (9 goals)

The 1992–93 Divizia B was the 53rd season of the second tier of the Romanian football league system.

The format has been changed from three series to only two series, both of them having 18 teams. At the end of the season, the winners of the series promoted to Divizia A and the last two places from both series relegated to Divizia C.

== Team changes ==
=== To Divizia B ===
Promoted from Divizia C

- –

Relegated from Divizia A

- Argeș Pitești
- ASA Târgu Mureș
- Corvinul Hunedoara

=== From Divizia B ===
Relegated to Divizia C

- Petrolul Ianca
- Aris Arad
- Chimica Târnăveni
- Olimpia Râmnicu Sărat
- Gaz Metan Mediaș
- Electromureș Târgu Mureș
- CS Târgoviște
- UM Timișoara
- Minerul Cavnic
- FEPA 74 Bârlad
- Șoimii IPA Sibiu
- Aripile Bacău
- Caracal
- Metalurgistul Slatina
- Relonul Savinești
- Sportul 30 Decembrie
- Astra Arad
- Borzești

Promoted to Divizia A

- Progresul București
- CSM Reșița
- Universitatea Cluj

== League tables ==
=== Serie I ===
Pos	Team	Pld	W	D	L	GF	GA	GD	Pts	Promotion or relegation
1	Ceahlăul Piatra Neamț (C, P)	34	20	7	7	54	24	+30	47	Promotion to Divizia A
2	Steaua Mizil	34	19	3	12	71	31	+40	41	
3	Argeș Pitești	34	16	9	9	64	32	+32	41	
4	Flacăra Moreni	34	19	3	12	48	41	+7	41	
5	ASA Târgu Mureș	34	18	3	13	48	40	+8	39	
6	Unirea Focșani	34	14	9	11	44	34	+10	37	
7	Gloria Buzău	34	15	5	14	62	55	+7	35	
8	Callatis Mangalia	34	15	5	14	41	43	−2	35	
9	Faur București	34	15	4	15	51	40	+11	34	
10	Portul Constanța	34	15	4	15	57	53	+4	34	
11	CSM Suceava	34	14	6	14	44	47	−3	34	
12	Politehnica Iași	34	14	3	17	45	46	−1	31	
13	Chimia Râmnicu Vâlcea	34	13	5	16	56	62	−6	31	
14	Foresta Fălticeni	34	14	3	17	37	50	−13	31	
15	Autobuzul București	34	12	6	16	42	49	−7	30	
16	Gloria CFR Galați	34	12	6	16	39	49	−10	30	
17	Olt 90 Scornicești (R)	34	11	4	19	36	72	−36	26	Relegation to Divizia C
18	Unirea Slobozia (R)	34	5	5	24	23	94	−71	15	Relegation to Divizia C

Source: romaniansoccer.ro (in Romanian)
Rules for classification: 1) Points; 2) Head-to-head points; 3) Head-to-head goal difference; 4) Head-to-head goals scored; 5) Head-to-head away goals scored; 6) Goal difference; 7) Goals scored.
(C) Champions; (P) Promoted; (R) Relegated

=== Serie II ===
Pos	Team	Pld	W	D	L	GF	GA	GD	Pts	Promotion or relegation
1	UTA Arad (C, P)	34	20	4	10	64	33	+31	44	Promotion to Divizia A
2	Bihor Oradea	34	18	7	9	54	38	+16	43	
3	Jiul Petroșani	34	18	3	13	68	40	+28	39	
4	Gloria Reșița	34	18	3	13	42	35	+7	39	
5	Metrom Brașov	34	15	7	12	36	31	+5	37	
6	Maramureș Baia Mare	34	16	3	15	70	51	+19	35	
7	Tractorul Brașov	34	15	4	15	52	50	+2	34	
8	ICIM Brașov	34	14	6	14	45	44	+1	34	
9	Unirea Alba Iulia	34	15	3	16	49	52	−3	33	
10	Jiul IELIF Craiova	34	14	4	16	42	54	−12	32	
11	Metalul Bocșa	34	13	5	16	45	53	−8	31	
12	Drobeta-Turnu Severin	34	13	5	16	33	46	−13	31	
13	Corvinul Hunedoara	34	12	7	15	48	61	−13	31	
14	Armătura Zalău	34	14	2	18	47	54	−7	30	
15	CFR Cluj	34	13	3	18	56	68	−12	29	
16	CFR Timișoara	34	13	3	18	37	55	−18	29	
17	Metalurgistul Cugir (R)	34	12	5	17	44	65	−21	29	Relegation to Divizia C
18	Olimpia Satu Mare (Note: Olimpia Satu Mare were deducted 4 points.) (R)	34	14	4	16	55	57	−2	28	Relegation to Divizia C

Source: romaniansoccer.ro (in Romanian)
Rules for classification: 1) Points; 2) Head-to-head points; 3) Head-to-head goal difference; 4) Head-to-head goals scored; 5) Head-to-head away goals scored; 6) Goal difference; 7) Goals scored.
(C) Champions; (P) Promoted; (R) Relegated

== Top scorers ==
9 goals

- (Romania) Constantin Barbu (Argeș Pitești)

4 goals

- (Romania) Haralambie Antohi (Gloria CFR Galați)

3 goals

- (Romania) Gigi Ion (Ceahlăul Piatra Neamț)

== See also ==
- 1992–93 Divizia A
