= 2005–06 FC Vaslui season =

FC Vaslui
2005–06 season
- Owner: (Romania) Adrian Porumboiu
- President: (Romania) Ciprian Damian
- Manager: (Romania) Basarab Panduru (Resigned on 10 September 2005) (Romania) Mircea Rednic (From 11 September 2005)
- Stadium: Municipal
- Divizia A: 14th
- Cupa României: Round of 16, eliminated
- Top goalscorer: League: (Romania) Valentin Badea (5); All: (Romania) Valentin Badea (5)
- Highest home attendance: 12,000 vs FC Steaua București (7 June 2006)
- Lowest home attendance: 4,000 vs FC Argeş (12 April 2006)

The 2005–06 season is FC Vaslui's 4th season of its existence, and its first, in Divizia A. FC Vaslui has promoted last season, after finished 1st in Liga II. In the summer, a lot of experienced players were signed, but after 15 matches, FC Vaslui was in the 16th place, having no victory, with only 6 points (all draws). In the winter, FC Vaslui bought Huţan, Sfârlea, Bukvić and Mihalcea. The team impressed in the second half of the season, finishing on 7th place. FC Vaslui assured its presence in the next season in Liga I, on 29th matchday. In the last game of the season, Steaua came to Vaslui, who needed a victory to assure its 23rd title. Unsurprisingly, Steaua won the match, but the win was very contested by Rapid Bucuresti's officials, but also by the team owner, Adrian Porumboiu. On the very next day, he announced his retirement from FC Vaslui, and the team also remained with only 8 players for the new season.

== First-team squad ==
No.	Name	Age	Nat.	Since	T. Apps.	L. Apps.	C. Apps.	I. Apps.	T. Goals	L. Goals	C. Goals	I. Goals	Ends	Transfer fee	Notes
Goalkeepers
1	Sebastian Huţan	21	(Romania)	2006 (W)	15	15	0	0	0	0	0	0	2006	Loan	
12	Marius Bratu	32	(Romania)	2006 (W)	6	6	0	0	0	0	0	0	N/A	Free	
22	Cristian Hăisan	24	(Romania)	2002	13	10	3	0	0	0	0	0	N/A	Undisclosed	
Defenders
3	Ilie Baicu	30	(Romania)	2005	26	24	2	0	1	1	0	0	N/A	Free	
6	Dan Lăcustă	28	(Romania)	2005	23	22	1	0	0	0	0	0	N/A	Free	
15	Bogdan Buhuş	25	(Romania)	2005	28	26	2	0	0	0	0	0	N/A	Free	
16	Bogdan Nicolae	29	(Romania)	2006 (W)	10	10	0	0	0	0	0	0	N/A	Free	
17	Bogdan Panait	22	(Romania)	2003	76	74	2	0	5	5	0	0	N/A	Undisclosed	
23	Darko Maletić	24	(Bosnia and Herzegovina)	2006 (W)	5	5	0	0	0	0	0	0	N/A	Free	
Midfielders
4	Ionuț Badea	29	(Romania)	2005	30	28	2	0	4	3	1	0	N/A	Free	
5	Cornel Cornea	23	(Romania)	2006 (W)	9	9	0	0	0	0	0	0	N/A	Undisclosed	
7	Petar Jovanović	22	(Serbia and Montenegro)	2005	27	26	1	0	2	2	0	0	N/A	Undisclosed	
8	Sebastian Sfârlea	23	(Romania)	2006 (W)	12	12	0	0	1	1	0	0	N/A	Undisclosed	
10	Marius Croitoru	24	(Romania)	2006 (W)	14	14	0	0	2	2	0	0	N/A	Free	
19	Vladislav Lungu	28	(Moldova)	2006 (W)	3	3	0	0	0	0	0	0	N/A	Free	
20	Tudorel Stanciu	25	(Romania)	2006 (W)	4	4	0	0	0	0	0	0	N/A	Free	
21	Ionuţ Danteş	22	(Romania)	2006 (W)	2	2	0	0	0	0	0	0	N/A	Free	
25	Dan Pîslă	19	(Moldova)	2006 (W)	1	1	0	0	0	0	0	0	N/A	Free	
27	Vasile Buhăescu	17	(Romania)	2005	16	15	1	0	0	0	0	0	N/A	Youth	
–	Sorin Frunză	27	(Romania)	2002	85	82	3	0	33	31	2	0	N/A	Undisclosed	
Forwards
9	Valentin Badea	24	(Romania)	2002	107	103	4	0	43	42	1	0	N/A	Undisclosed	
11	Cătălin Cursaru	27	(Romania)	2005	12	11	1	0	0	0	0	0	N/A	Free	
24	Adrian Mihalcea	29	(Romania)	2006 (W)	13	13	0	0	1	1	0	0	N/A	Free	
26	Milorad Bukvić	29	(Serbia and Montenegro)	2006 (W)	15	15	0	0	2	2	0	0	N/A	Free	

== Statistics ==
=== Appearances and goals ===
Last updated on 7 June 2006.

No.	Pos	Nat	Player	Total		Divizia A		Cupa României	
No.	Pos	Nat	Player	Apps	Goals	Apps	Goals	Apps	Goals
1	GK	(Romania) ROU	Sebastian Huţan	15	-16	15	-16	0	0
3	DF	(Romania) ROU	Ilie Baicu	26	1	24	1	1+1	0
4	MF	(Romania) ROU	Ionuţ Badea	30	4	28	3	2	1
5	MF	(Romania) ROU	Cornel Cornea	9	0	5+4	0	0	0
6	DF	(Romania) ROU	Florian Dan Lăcustă	23	0	21+1	0	1	0
7	MF	(Serbia and Montenegro) SCG	Petar Jovanović	27	2	24+2	2	1	0
8	MF	(Romania) ROU	Sebastian Sfârlea	12	1	12	1	0	0
9	FW	(Romania) ROU	Valentin Badea	23	5	19+4	5	0	0
10	MF	(Romania) ROU	Marius Croitoru	14	2	14	2	0	0
11	FW	(Romania) ROU	Cătălin Cursaru	12	0	5+6	0	1	0
12	GK	(Romania) ROU	Marius Bratu	0	0	0	0	0	0
15	DF	(Romania) ROU	Bogdan Buhuş	28	0	26	0	2	0
16	DF	(Romania) ROU	Bogdan Nicolae	10	0	4+6	0	0	0
17	DF	(Romania) ROU	Bogdan Panait	27	4	25+1	4	1	0
19	MF	(Moldova) MDA	Vladislav Lungu	3	0	3	0	0	0
20	MF	(Romania) ROU	Tudorel Stanciu	4	0	1+3	0	0	0
21	MF	(Romania) ROU	Ionuţ Danteş	2	0	0+2	0	0	0
22	GK	(Romania) ROU	Cristian Hăisan	10	-9	8	-6	2	-3
23	DF	(Bosnia and Herzegovina) BIH	Darko Maletić	5	0	1+4	0	0	0
24	FW	(Romania) ROU	Adrian Mihalcea	13	1	9+4	1	0	0
25	MF	(Moldova) MDA	Dan Pîslă	1	0	0+1	0	0	0
26	FW	(Serbia and Montenegro) SCG	Milorad Bukvić	15	3	12+3	3	0	0
27	MF	(Romania) ROU	Vasile Buhăescu	16	0	2+13	0	0+1	0
-	MF	(Romania) ROU	Sorin Frunză	14	0	12+1	0	1	0
Players sold or loaned out during the season
1	GK	(Serbia and Montenegro) SCG	Dejan Pešić	5	-9	4+1	-9	0	0
3	DF	(Romania) ROU	Sorin Ungurianu	5	0	2+2	0	1	0
4	MF	(Brazil) BRA	Igor de Lima	4	0	2+2	0	0	0
5	DF	(Romania) ROU	Irinel Voicu	7	0	5+1	0	1	0
6	MF	(Romania) ROU	Mihai Hapiuc	1	0	0+1	0	0	0
6	MF	(Brazil) BRA	Nivaldo Vieira Lima	4	0	3	0	1	0
7	FW	(Moldova) MDA	Viorel Frunză	6	0	3+2	0	1	0
11	FW	(Romania) ROU	Tihamer Torok	14	0	5+8	0	1	0
12	GK	(Romania) ROU	Gabriel Kajcsa	3	-6	3	-6	0	0
14	FW	(Romania) ROU	Claudiu Răducanu	17	3	15	1	2	2
16	MF	(Romania) ROU	Dan Iurişniţi	9	0	6+2	0	1	0
19	MF	(Romania) ROU	Lucian Tarcea	4	0	2+1	0	0+1	0
20	MF	(Romania) ROU	Cristian Pelin	4	0	0+2	0	1+1	0
21	FW	(Romania) ROU	Sabin Ilie	5	0	2+2	0	1	0
23	FW	(Uruguay) URU	Dionisio Cabrera	1	0	0+1	0	0	0
25	DF	(Romania) ROU	George Şoltuz	3	0	1+2	0	0	0
25	MF	(Cameroon) CMR	Nana Falemi	7	0	6	0	0+1	0
28	MF	(Guinea) GUI	Mbemba Sylla	4	0	1+2	0	0+1	0

=== Top scorers ===
Position	Nation	Number	Name	Divizia A	Romanian Cup	Total
1	(Romania)	9	Valentin Badea	5	0	5
2	(Romania)	17	Bogdan Panait	4	0	4
=	(Romania)	4	Ionuţ Badea	3	1	4
4	(Serbia and Montenegro)	26	Milorad Bukvić	3	0	3
=	(Romania)	14	Claudiu Răducanu	1	2	3
6	(Romania)	10	Marius Croitoru	2	0	2
=	(Serbia and Montenegro)	7	Petar Jovanović	2	0	2
8	(Romania)	3	Ilie Baicu	1	0	1
=	(Romania)	8	Sebastian Sfârlea	1	0	1
=	(Romania)	24	Adrian Mihalcea	1	0	1
/	/	/	Own Goals	0	0	0
			TOTALS	23	3	26

=== Disciplinary record ===
Position	Nation	Number	Name	Divizia A		Romanian Cup		Total	
Position	Nation	Number	Name	Booked	Sent off (straight red)	Booked	Sent off (straight red)	Booked	Sent off (straight red)
DF	(Romania)	3	Ilie Baicu	4	0	0	0	4	0
MF	(Brazil)	4	Igor de Lima	2	0	0	0	2	0
MF	(Romania)	4	Ionuţ Badea	5	0	0	0	5	0
MF	(Serbia and Montenegro)	7	Petar Jovanović	6	0	0	0	6	0
FW	(Moldova)	7	Viorel Frunză	1	1	0	0	1	1
MF	(Romania)	10	Sorin Frunză	2	1	0	0	2	1
MF	(Romania)	10	Marius Croitoru	3	0	0	0	3	0
FW	(Romania)	14	Claudiu Răducanu	2	0	0	0	2	0
DF	(Romania)	15	Bogdan Buhuş	6	0	0	0	6	0
MF	(Romania)	16	Dan Iurişniţi	2	0	0	0	2	0
DF	(Romania)	17	Bogdan Panait	4	1	0	0	4	1
MF	(Romania)	18	Vasile Buhăescu	1	0	0	0	1	0
MF	(Romania)	20	Tudorel Stanciu	1	0	0	0	1	0
MF	(Bosnia and Herzegovina)	23	Darko Maletić	1	0	0	0	1	0
DF	(Romania)	25	George Şoltuz	2	0	0	0	2	0
MF	(Cameroon)	25	Nana Falemi	1	1	0	0	3	1
			TOTALS	43	4	0	0	43	4

=== Overall ===
Games played	32 (30 Divizia A, 2 Cupa României)
Games won	7 (6 Divizia A, 1 Cupa României)
Games drawn	11 (11 Divizia A)
Games lost	14 (13 Divizia A, 1 Cupa României)
Goals scored	26
Goals conceded	40
Goal difference	-14
Yellow cards	43
Red cards	4
Worst discipline	(Serbia and Montenegro) Petar Jovanović and (Romania) Bogdan Buhuş with 6 yellow cards
Best result	3–0 (H) v FC Argeş – Divizia A – 12 April 2006
Worst result	0–4 (H) v Steaua București – Divizia A – 7 June 2006
Most appearances	(Romania) Ionuţ Badea with 30 appearances
Top scorer	(Romania) Valentin Badea (5 goals)
Points	29/90 (32.22%)

Last updated: 7 Jun
Source: World Football

==== Performances ====
Updated to games played on 7 June 2006.

	All								Home						Away					
	Pld	Pts	W	D	L	GF	GA	GD	W	D	L	GF	GA	GD	W	D	L	GF	GA	GD
League	30	29	6	11	13	23	37	-14	3	5	7	12	21	-9	3	6	6	11	16	-5
Overall	32	–	7	11	14	26	40	-14	3	5	7	12	21	-9	4	6	7	14	19	-5

==== Goal minutes ====
Updated to games played on 7 June 2006.

1'–15'	16'–30'	31'–HT	46'–60'	61'–75'	76'–FT	Extra time
5	3	3	4	5	5	1

== Divizia A ==
=== League table ===
Pos	Team	Pld	W	D	L	GF	GA	GD	Pts	Qualification or relegation
12	Argeș Pitești	30	8	8	14	27	37	−10	32	
13	Jiul Petroșani	30	7	9	14	28	39	−11	30	
14	Vaslui	30	6	11	13	23	37	−14	29	
15	Pandurii Târgu Jiu	30	6	7	17	22	44	−22	25	Spared from relegation (Note: Sportul Studențesc was denied the right to participate for next season of Liga I because it failed to meet the licensing requirements, therefore Pandurii Lignitul Târgu Jiu (15th place) was spared from relegation.)
16	Bacău (R)	30	3	5	22	16	55	−39	14	Relegation to Liga II

Source: LPF (in Romanian)
Rules for classification: 1) points; 2) head-to-head points; 3) head-to-head goal difference; 4) head-to-head goals scored; 5) goal difference; 6) number of goals scored.
(R) Relegated

=== Results summary ===
Overall								Home						Away					
Pld	W	D	L	GF	GA	GD	Pts	W	D	L	GF	GA	GD	W	D	L	GF	GA	GD
30	6	11	13	23	37	−14	29	3	5	7	12	21	−9	3	6	6	11	16	−5

=== Results by round ===
Round	1	2	3	4	5	6	7	8	9	10	11	12	13	14	15	16	17	18	19	20	21	22	23	24	25	26	27	28	29	30
Ground	H	A	H	A	H	A	A	H	A	H	A	H	A	H	A	A	H	A	H	A	H	H	A	H	A	H	A	H	A	H
Result	L	D	L	L	L	L	L	D	L	D	D	L	L	D	D	D	W	L	L	D	L	W	W	D	D	W	W	D	W	L
Position	12	13	14	15	15	15	16	16	16	16	16	16	16	16	16	16	16	16	16	16	16	15	14	14	14	14	13	14	13	14

Updated to match(es) played on 7 June 2006. Source: LPF
A = Away; H = Home; W = Win; D = Draw; L = Loss

=== Matches ===
6 August 2005 Matchday 1	Vaslui	0–1	Rapid București	Vaslui
18:00 EET		Report	R. Stancu 42'	Stadium: Municipal; Attendance: 10 000; Referee: Sorin Corpodean

13 August 2005 Matchday 2	Gloria Bistriţa	1–1	Vaslui	Bistriţa
18:00 EET	Negrean 85'	Report	V. Badea 28'	Stadium: Gloria; Attendance: 1,200; Referee: Cristian Balaj

19 August 2005 Matchday 3	Vaslui	0–3	CFR Cluj	Vaslui
18:00 EET		Report	Tilincă 18'; Anca 45+1'; Surdu 64'	Stadium: Municipal; Attendance: 8 000; Referee: Lucian Dan

27 August 2005 Matchday 4	Sportul Studenţesc	3–0	Vaslui	București
18:00 EET	Nae 7'; Raţiu 43'; Lăcustă 82' (o.g.)	Report		Stadium: Regie; Attendance: 1 500; Referee: Augustus Constantin

10 September 2005 Matchday 5	Vaslui	1–2	Jiul Petroşani	Vaslui
17:00 EET	Jovanović 43'	Report	Drăgan 7'; C. Petre 59'	Stadium: Municipal; Attendance: 7 000; Referee: Marian Salomir

16 September 2005 Matchday 6	Farul	2–1	Vaslui	Constanţa
20:00 EET	Paşcovici 35'; T. Moldovan 74'	Report	Răducanu 22' (pen.)	Stadium: Gheorghe Hagi; Attendance: 2 000; Referee: Sorin Corpodean

24 September 2005 Matchday 7	FC Argeş	1–0	Vaslui	Mioveni
17:00 EET	Tănasă 45+2'	Report		Stadium: Orăşenesc; Attendance: 2 500; Referee: Alexandru Deaconu

1 October 2005 Matchday 8	Vaslui	0–0	FC Naţional	Vaslui
15:00 EET		Report		Stadium: Municipal; Attendance: 8 000; Referee: Robert Dumitru

14 October 2005 Matchday 9	Poli Timișoara	2–0	Vaslui	Timișoara
18:00 EET	V. Moldovan 76'; Olah 93'	Report		Stadium: Dan Păltinişanu; Attendance: 9 000; Referee: Lucian Dan

22 October 2005 Matchday 10	Vaslui	0–0	Oţelul Galaţi	Vaslui
15:00 EET		Report		Stadium: Municipal; Attendance: 6 000; Referee: Ionică Serea

29 October 2005 Matchday 11	Pandurii	0–0	Vaslui	Târgu Jiu
15:00 EET		Report		Stadium: Tudor Vladimirescu; Attendance: 4 000; Referee: Orlando Tradu

6 November 2005 Matchday 12	Vaslui	1–2	Dinamo București	Vaslui
13:00 EET	I. Badea 93'	Report	Pleşan 68'; Niculescu 80'	Stadium: Municipal; Attendance: 9 500; Referee: Augustus Constantin

20 November 2005 Matchday 13	Poli Iaşi	1–0	Vaslui	Iaşi
13:00 EET	Pacurar 88'	Report		Stadium: Emil Alexandrescu; Attendance: 7 000; Referee: Alexandru Deaconu

26 November 2005 Matchday 14	Vaslui	1–1	FCM Bacău	Vaslui
14:00 EET	Jovanović 46'	Report	Neagu 35'	Stadium: Municipal; Attendance: 6 000; Referee: Marius Martiş

4 December 2005 Matchday 15	Steaua București	2–2	Vaslui	București
18:00 EET	Dică 7'; Boştină 75'	Report	I. Badea 62' (pen.); V. Badea 67'	Stadium: Ghencea; Attendance: 12 000; Referee: Alexandru Deaconu

12 March 2006 Matchday 16	Rapid București	1–1	Vaslui	București
18:30 EET	Bădoi 75'	Report	V. Badea 13'	Stadium: Valentin Stănescu; Attendance: 2 000; Referee: Sorin Corpodean

18 March 2006 Matchday 17	Vaslui	2–0	Gloria Bistriţa	Vaslui
15:30 EET	Croitoru 9'; Bukvić 80'	Report		Stadium: Municipal; Attendance: 10 000; Referee: Victor Berbecaru

25 March 2006 Matchday 18	CFR Cluj	1–0	Vaslui	Cluj-Napoca
15:00 EET	Roszel 75'	Report		Stadium: Constantin Rădulescu; Attendance: 4 500; Referee: Alexandru Tudor

31 March 2006 Matchday 19	Vaslui	0–3	Sportul Studenţesc	Vaslui
16:00 EET		Report	Ferfelea 42'; Mazilu 64'; Curelea 92'	Stadium: Municipal; Attendance: 9 000; Referee: Ionică Serea

5 April 2006 Matchday 20	Jiul Petroşani	0–0	Vaslui	Petroşani
17:00 EET		Report		Stadium: Jiul; Attendance: 4 000; Referee: Sorin Corpodean

9 April 2006 Matchday 21	Vaslui	0–2	Farul	Vaslui
16:00 EET		Report	Voiculeţ 69'; Guriţă 84'	Stadium: Municipal; Attendance: 8 000; Referee: Lucian Dan

12 April 2006 Matchday 22	Vaslui	3–0	FC Argeş	Vaslui
17:00 EET	Panait 3' (pen.), 47'; Mihalcea 56'	Report		Stadium: Municipal; Attendance: 4 000; Referee: Mugurel Drăgănescu

15 April 2006 Matchday 23	FC Naţional	0–1	Vaslui	București
17:00 EET		Report	V. Badea 4'	Stadium: Cotroceni; Attendance: 1 500; Referee: Marian Salomir

21 April 2006 Matchday 24	Vaslui	1–1	Poli Timișoara	Vaslui
17:00 EET	I. Badea 70'	Report	Stanić 47'	Stadium: Municipal; Attendance: 9 000; Referee: Vasile Bratu

30 April 2006 Matchday 25	Oţelul Galaţi	1–1	Vaslui	Galaţi
16:30 EET	V. Tănase 91'	Report	Sfârlea 31'	Stadium: Oţelul; Attendance: 5 000; Referee: Alexandru Deaconu

6 May 2006 Matchday 26	Vaslui	2–1	Pandurii	Vaslui
18:00 EET	Panait 24'; Bukvić 73'	Report	Disney 58'	Stadium: Municipal; Attendance: 8 000; Referee: Sorin Corpodean

13 May 2006 Matchday 27	Dinamo București	1–2	Vaslui	București
20:30 EET	Alexa 16'	Report	Croitoru 43'; V. Badea 80'	Stadium: Dinamo; Attendance: 6 000; Referee: Victor Berbecaru

19 May 2006 Matchday 28	Vaslui	1–1	Poli Iaşi	Vaslui
18:00 EET	Baicu 78'	Report	Bâlbă 5'	Stadium: Municipal; Attendance: 10 000; Referee: Alexandru Deaconu

2 June 2006 Matchday 29	FCM Bacău	0–2	Vaslui	Bacău
20:00 EET		Report	Bukvić 2'; Panait 70'	Stadium: Municipal; Attendance: 1 500; Referee: Anton Heleşteanu

7 June 2006 Matchday 30	Vaslui	0–4	Steaua București	Vaslui
17:00 EET		Report	Rădoi 5' (pen.); Dică 10', 43', 56'	Stadium: Municipal; Attendance: 12 000; Referee: Sebastian Colţescu

== Cupa României ==
21 September 2005 Round of 32	Gloria Bistriţa "B"	1–2	Vaslui	Bistriţa
15:00 EET	R. Radu 42'	Report	I. Badea 50'; Răducanu 114'	Stadium: Gloria; Attendance: 400; Referee: S. Bogdan

26 October 2005 Round of 16	Vaslui	1–2	Poli Iaşi	Bacău
14:00 EET	Răducanu 86' (pen.)	Report	Bâlbă 47'; Onofraş 118'	Stadium: Municipal; Attendance: 1 000; Referee: Sorin Corpodean
