= 2012–13 FC Vaslui season =

FC Vaslui
2012–13 season
- Manager: Gavril Balint
- Stadium: Municipal
- Liga I: 5th
- Cupa României: Round of 32 (eliminated)
- UEFA Champions League: Third qualifying round (eliminated)
- UEFA Europa League: Play-Off (eliminated)
- Top goalscorer: League: Niculae (11 goals); All: Niculae (12 goals)
- Highest home attendance: 13,500 v Internazionale; 23 August 2012
- Lowest home attendance: 1,000 v Gloria Bistriţa; 11 March 2013

The 2012–13 season is the eleventh season in FC Vaslui's existence, and its eighth in a row in the top flight of Romanian football. Vaslui will seek to win their first trophy, competing in the Liga I, the Romanian Cup and the UEFA Champions League, after finishing second in the previous Liga I.

== Review ==
=== Pre-season ===
Vaslui's pre-season transfers started as early as 23 May 2012, when Porumboiu announced they were going to sign Adrian Popa from Concordia Chiajna for an undisclosed fee. However, the transfer collapsed since the player failed his medical. On 24 May, it was reported that Vaslui dropped off the services of Jaime Bragança and Savio Nsereko. On 30 May, Vaslui president, Daniel Stanciu announced that Cape Verde international, Fernando Varela signed a three-year contract as a free agent to substitute Pavol Farkaš, and Romanian international, László Sepsi is going to join Vaslui. However, Sepsi eventually signed CFR Cluj. On 31 May, Chievo Verona reported that they have signed Romanian international, Paul Papp for an undisclosed fee. Later that day, Porumboiu confirmed that Chievo Verona acquired 75% of the player's rights for more than €1,500,000. The media speculated that the real transfer fee is estimated around €2,500,000.

Vaslui's first and only pre-season training camp was set in Austria. Vaslui's first friendlies for the pre-season schedule were fixed against Czech champions Slovan Liberec and vice-champions Sparta Prague, and Russian Premier League side Terek Grozny. Four more friendlies were set up against Albania champions Skënderbeu Korçë, Russian side FC Krasnodar, Azerbaijan vice-champions Khazar Lankaran and a Regional League side from Austria.

To celebrate the first decade since the foundation, the club decided to change the crest. The new crest was accompanied by the words 'Ad Unum Omnes', translated 'All As One'. The change was not welcomed by Vaslui's fans, who claimed that once dropping the old crest, the club also drops off the history of the club.

On 9 June, media reported that two youngsters from Olimpia Satu Mare, Valter Heil and Ervin Zsiga are set to be taken on trial by Vaslui. On 13 June, Liviu Antal and Adrian Sălăgeanu joined Vaslui from Oţelul Galaţi for a joint fee of €700,000. Antal signed a four-year contract, while Sălăgeanu it is yet to sign. One day later, Irineu Calixto Couto joined Vaslui on trial. On 16 June, despite he previously agreed to extend his contract for one more year, Adaílton decided to retire from professional football, in order to be with his family. On the same day, FCM Târgu Mureș defender, Andrei Cordoş signed a two-year contract with Vaslui for an undisclosed fee. One day later, Vaslui signed Olhanense midfielder Cauê for an undisclosed fee, estimated to be around €700,000. On 18 June, Vaslui dropped off the services of the Brazilian defenders Anderson and Gladstone. On the same day, both Valter Heil and Ervin Zsiga signed a five-year contract with Vaslui. Vaslui also signed Leixões midfielder Eduardo Jumisse for an undisclosed fee. One day later, two more players were released, strikers Yero Bello and Răzvan Neagu. Despite media reported that midfielder Adrian Gheorghiu was also released, he played in the second half of the friendly against Khazar Lankaran. On 20 June, Vaslui signed Polish defender Piotr Celeban, after his contract with Śląsk Wrocław expired.

On the same day, Vaslui played its first pre-season friendly against Skënderbeu Korçë. Liviu Antal scored his first goal for Vaslui, assisted by Milanov in the 40th minute to win the match for the club. On 24 July, the team traveled to Kössen where they faced Khazar Lankaran. Vaslui took a 1–0 lead in the first half-hour through N'Doye, but Bonfim equalized in the 67th minute, establishing the final score. Nicolae Stanciu, who had worn the number 31 in the previous season, switched to the number 10 shirt following Adaílton's retirement. Three days later, Vaslui suffered its first defeat from the pre-season, losing 2–1 against Terek Grozny. Lebedenko opened the scoresheet in the 78th minute, before Ervin Zsiga equalised with an 85th-minute goal; however, three minutes later Terek restored their lead with a goal from Oleg Vlasov. On 1 July, Vaslui faced Gambrinus liga side Sparta Prague. Antal opened the score in the 8th minute, before Mario Holek equalized two minutes later. In the 12th minute, Reis scored his first goal for Vaslui, since he is on trial. A 51st-minute goal from Sparta Prague captain Marek Matějovský secured his team a draw, counting Vaslui's second draw from the pre-season.

Vaslui had also news regarding the staff, where Marius Baciu and Eduard Iordănescu have been appointed assistant managers on 14 and 26 June respectively. The appointment of Iordănescu without being consulted, drove Augusto Inácio mad and therefore, on 4 July he resigned from the manager position. Later that day, Porumboiu confirmed that Marius Şumudică has been appointed as the new manager.

On the same day, Vaslui faced the Regional League side Bischoffen. Since Inácio resigned earlier that day, Iordănescu took care of the team. Despite the start-up team consisted in bench players, they began to flow thick and fast as Vasile Buhăescu scored four goals, Nicolae Stanciu, Liviu Antal, Andrei Cordoş, Ervin Zsiga and Tiago Targino got one each to secure a 9–1 win. Şumudică's first two matches in charge ended in a 1–0 defeats against United Arab Emirates Olympic Team and Slovan Liberec on 6 and 7 July respectively.

On 9 July, Sergiu Popovici was loaned out to Gloria Bistrița for one season long. On the same day, striker Sabrin Sburlea signed from Rapid București for an undisclosed fee, thought to be €750,000. On 11 July, Vaslui traveled to Kirchdorf in Tirol to face FC Krasnodar. Wesley scored a brace, counting Şumudică's first win as Vaslui manager. A goalless draw against Saudi Professional League side Ittihad FC ended Vaslui's pre-season, on 12 July.

On 13 July, Marius Constantin returned to his former club Rapid București, signing a four-year contract for an undisclosed fee, believed to be around €250,000. In return, Vaslui opted for a cheaper deal signing free agent Elias Charalambous on a one-year contract, after his contract with Karlsruher SC expired. Three days later, Dănuţ Coman signed a two-year contract from Rapid București, for a reported fee of €62,000. Two days before the opening match for Vaslui, Marius Niculae signed a two-year contract from Dinamo București, for a reported fee of €300,000.

=== Liga I ===
The fixtures for the 2012–13 season were announced on 11 June, with an early Liga I title contender clash against Rapid București in the opening match, for the third year in a row.

On 22 July, Vaslui travelled to Bucharest to face Rapid București for the third year in a row in the opening match. It took Vaslui just over half an hour to open the scoring against Rapid; when N'Doye fed Wesley inside the box and the Brazilian scored with a right-footed strike towards the left corner of Călin Albuț's goal. Daniel Pancu equalized in the stoppage-time of the first half, from a free-kick obtained by him. Vaslui took the lead, three minutes from the second half, when Celeban threw up the ball, Niculae crossed with a header for Wesley, whose scissor-kick execution put the ball past Albuț. Rapid equalized with a late goal, when Filipe Teixeira scored with a header, following Ștefan Grigorie's corner.

== First-team squad ==
No.	Name	Age	Nat.	Since	T. Apps.	L. Apps.	C. Apps.	I. Apps.	T. Goals	L. Goals	C. Goals	I. Goals	Ends	Transfer fee
Goalkeepers
12	Vytautas Černiauskas	23	(Lithuania)	2010	39	29	0	10	0	0	0	0	2015	Undisclosed
89	Cătălin Straton	22	(Romania)	2012 (W)	9	7	1	1	0	0	0	0	2016	Undisclosed
Defenders
3	Fernando Varela	24	(Cape Verde)	2012	35	31	0	4	2	1	0	1	2015	Free
5	Piotr Celeban	27	(Poland)	2012	31	29	0	2	7	7	0	0	2016	Free
6	Valter Heil	22	(Romania)	2012	1	1	0	0	0	0	0	0	2017	€25,000
20	Zhivko Milanov	27	(Bulgaria)	2010 (W)	125	103	7	15	2	1	0	1	2013	€350,000
23	Adrian Sălăgeanu	29	(Romania)	2012	26	22	0	4	0	0	0	0	2015	€200,000
33	Elias Charalambous	31	(Cyprus)	2012	21	18	0	3	1	1	0	0	2013	Free
67	Andrei Cordoş	24	(Romania)	2012	13	11	1	1	0	0	0	0	2014	€150,000
Midfielders
8	Liviu Antal	23	(Romania)	2012	35	30	1	4	5	4	0	1	2016	€500,000
10	Nicolae Stanciu	19	(Romania)	2011	55	47	4	4	3	2	0	1	2016	€200,000
11	Emile Paul Tendeng	20	(Senegal)	2013 (W)	5	5	0	0	0	0	0	0	2013	Free agent
16	Cauê	23	(Brazil)	2012	33	29	0	4	1	1	0	0	2015	€700,000
17	Sergiu Popovici	19	(Romania)	2011	5	5	0	0	0	0	0	0	N/A	Undisclosed
18	Lucian Sânmărtean (captain)	32	(Romania)	2010 (W)	130	105	9	16	12	11	1	0	2015	€70,000
30	Raul Costin	27	(Romania)	2009	123	100	11	12	8	5	3	0	N/A	€100,000
70	Nderim Nexhipi	28	(North Macedonia)	2013 (W)	7	7	0	0	0	0	0	0	2015	Free
77	Eduardo Jumisse	28	(Mozambique)	2012	17	17	0	0	2	2	0	0	N/A	€400,000
78	Ousmane N'Doye	34	(Senegal)	2012 (W)	70	56	4	10	6	3	1	2	2013	Free
88	Vasile Buhăescu	24	(Romania)	2005	119	100	9	10	8	7	1	0	2013	Youth
Forwards
9	Sabrin Sburlea	23	(Romania)	2012	18	13	1	4	2	2	0	0	2016	€750,000
19	Mike Temwanjera	30	(Zimbabwe)	2007 (W)	169	143	9	17	42	34	3	5	2013	Undisclosed
40	Alex Buziuc	18	(Romania)	2013 (W)	1	1	0	0	0	0	0	0	2018	Undisclosed

- T=Total
- L=Liga I
- C=Cupa României
- I=UEFA Europa League, Intertoto UEFA Cup

== Transfers ==
=== Summer ===
==== In ====
#	Position	Player	Transferred from	Fee	Date	Source
1	GK	(Romania) Dănuţ Coman	(Romania) Rapid București	€65,000	16 July 2012	
3	DF	(Cape Verde) Fernando Varela	(Portugal) Feirense	Free transfer	31 May 2012	
5	DF	(Poland) Piotr Celeban	(Poland) Śląsk Wrocław	Free transfer	20 June 2012	
7	MF	(Portugal) Davide	(Romania) Braşov	Free transfer	11 July 2012	
8	MF	(Romania) Liviu Antal	(Romania) Oţelul Galaţi	€500,000	14 June 2012	
9	FW	(Romania) Sabrin Sburlea	(Romania) Rapid București	€750,000	9 July 2012	
11	MF	(Romania) Ervin Zsiga	(Romania) Olimpia Satu Mare	€15,000	18 June 2012	
16	MF	(Brazil) Cauê	(Portugal) Olhanense	€700,000	17 June 2012	
23	DF	(Romania) Adrian Sălăgeanu	(Romania) Oţelul Galaţi	€200,000	14 June 2012	
25	MF	(Nigeria) Michael Tukura	(Latvia) Ventspils	Free transfer	12 July 2012	
29	FW	(Romania) Marius Niculae	(Romania) Dinamo București	€300,000	20 July 2012	
33	DF	(Cyprus) Elias Charalambous	(Germany) Karlsruher SC	Free transfer	13 July 2012	
40	MF	(Romania) Dacian Varga	(Romania) Sportul Studenţesc	Loan	14 August 2012	
67	DF	(Romania) Andrei Cordoş	(Romania) FCM Târgu Mureș	€150,000	16 June 2012	
	DF	(Romania) Valter Heil	(Romania) Olimpia Satu Mare	€10,000	18 June 2012	

==== Out ====
#	Position	Player	Transferred to	Fee	Date	Source
1	GK	(Canada) Milan Borjan	(Turkey) Sivasspor	Loan return	1 June 2012	
3	DF	(Romania) Paul Papp	(Italy) Chievo Verona	€2,500,000	31 May 2012	
4	DF	(Romania) Marius Constantin	(Romania) Rapid București	€250,000	13 July 2012	
7	FW	(Germany) Savio Nsereko	(Italy) Fiorentina	Loan return	24 May 2012	
9	FW	(Nigeria) Yero Bello	Unattached	Released	19 June 2012	
10	FW	(Brazil) Adaílton	Unattached	Retired	18 June 2012	
11	MF	(Serbia) Nemanja Milisavljević	(Romania) Rapid București	Ended contract	1 June 2012	
14	DF	(Brazil) Anderson	Unattached	Released	18 June 2012	
17	DF	(Mozambique) Paíto	Unattached	Ended contract	1 June 2012	
23	MF	(Romania) Sergiu Popovici	(Romania) Gloria Bistrița	Loan	9 July 2012	
26	DF	(Slovenia) Pavol Farkaš	(Italy) Chievo Verona	Ended contract	1 June 2012	
80	MF	(Brazil) Wesley	(Saudi Arabia) Al-Hilal	€1,000,000	26 July 2012	
83	MF	(Portugal) Jaime Bragança	Unattached	Released	24 May 2012	
85	DF	(Brazil) Gladstone	(Brazil) Duque de Caxias	Released	18 June 2012	
	FW	(Romania) Răzvan Neagu	(Romania) CS Turnu Severin	Released	19 June 2012	

== Statistics ==
=== Appearances and goals ===
Last updated on 1 June 2013.

No.	Pos	Nat	Player	Total		Liga I		Europe		Cupa României	
No.	Pos	Nat	Player	Apps	Goals	Apps	Goals	Apps	Goals	Apps	Goals
1	GK	(Romania) ROU	Dănuț Coman	21	-27	18	-20	3	-7	0	0
3	DF	(Cape Verde) CPV	Fernando Varela	36	2	32	1	4	1	0	0
5	DF	(Poland) POL	Piotr Celeban	31	7	28+1	7	2	0	0	0
6	DF	(Romania) ROU	Valter Heil	1	0	1	0	0	0	0	0
8	MF	(Romania) ROU	Liviu Antal	36	6	23+8	5	4	1	0+1	0
9	FW	(Romania) ROU	Sabrin Sburlea	18	2	7+6	2	1+3	0	1	0
10	MF	(Romania) ROU	Nicolae Stanciu	36	2	21+10	1	4	1	1	0
11	MF	(Senegal) SEN	Emile Paul Tendeng	6	0	4+2	0	0	0	0	0
12	GK	(Lithuania) LTU	Vytautas Černiauskas	8	0	8	0	0	0	0	0
15	MF	(Romania) ROU	Adrian Neniță	1	0	0+1	0	0	0	0	0
16	MF	(Brazil) BRA	Cauê	34	1	26+4	1	3+1	0	0	0
17	MF	(Romania) ROU	Sergiu Popovici	6	0	3+3	0	0	0	0	0
18	MF	(Romania) ROU	Lucian Sânmărtean	34	7	29	7	3+1	0	0+1	0
19	FW	(Zimbabwe) ZIM	Mike Temwanjera	14	3	9+5	3	0	0	0	0
20	DF	(Bulgaria) BUL	Zhivko Milanov	34	1	30	1	3	0	1	0
23	DF	(Romania) ROU	Adrian Sălăgeanu	27	0	22+1	0	4	0	0	0
30	MF	(Romania) ROU	Raul Costin	26	0	13+10	0	0+2	0	1	0
33	DF	(Cyprus) CYP	Elias Charalambous	21	1	16+2	1	3	0	0	0
40	MF	(Romania) ROU	Alexandru Buziuc	2	0	0+2	0	0	0	0	0
67	DF	(Romania) ROU	Andrei Cordoş	14	0	5+7	0	1	0	1	0
70	MF	(North Macedonia) MKD	Nderim Nexhipi	7	0	1+6	0	0	0	0	0
77	MF	(Mozambique) MOZ	Eduardo Jumisse	18	1	17+1	1	0	0	0	0
78	MF	(Senegal) SEN	Ousmane N'Doye	21	1	14+3	1	4	0	0	0
88	MF	(Romania) ROU	Vasile Buhăescu	19	3	10+7	3	0+2	0	0	0
89	GK	(Romania) ROU	Cătălin Straton	10	-3	8	0	1	-2	1	-1
Players sold or loaned out during the season
7	MF	(Portugal) POR	Davide	6	0	0+5	0	0	0	1	0
11	MF	(Romania) ROU	Ervin Zsiga	3	0	0+1	0	0+1	0	1	0
15	DF	(Ghana) GHA	Richard Annang	0	0	0	0	0	0	0	0
17	MF	(Romania) ROU	Adrian Gheorghiu	2	0	0+1	0	0	0	1	0
21	FW	(Romania) ROU	Ionuţ Balaur	0	0	0	0	0	0	0	0
25	MF	(Nigeria) NGA	Michael Tukura	6	0	3+2	0	1	0	0	0
28	DF	(Romania) ROU	Gabriel Cânu	2	0	1	0	0	0	1	0
29	FW	(Romania) ROU	Marius Niculae	23	12	19	11	3	1	0+1	0
40	MF	(Romania) ROU	Dacian Varga	17	2	6+9	2	0+1	0	1	0
80	FW	(Brazil) BRA	Wesley	1	2	1	2	0	0	0	0
99	FW	(Romania) ROU	Daniel Mih	0	0	0	0	0	0	0	0

Missed penalties
Player	Pen.
(Senegal) Ousmane N'Doye	1
(Romania) Marius Niculae	1

Converted penalties
Player	Pen.
(Romania) Lucian Sânmărtean	3
(Romania) Nicolae Stanciu	1
(Romania) Dacian Varga	1

=== Top scorers ===
Position	Nation	Number	Name	Liga I	Europe	Romanian Cup	Total
1	(Romania)	29	Marius Niculae	11	1	0	12
2	(Poland)	5	Piotr Celeban	7	0	0	7
2	(Romania)	18	Lucian Sânmărtean	7	0	0	7
4	(Romania)	8	Liviu Antal	0	1	0	1
5	(Zimbabwe)	19	Mike Temwanjera	3	0	0	3
5	(Romania)	88	Vasile Buhăescu	3	0	0	3
7	(Cape Verde)	3	Fernando Varela	1	1	0	2
7	(Romania)	9	Sabrin Sburlea	2	0	0	2
7	(Romania)	10	Nicolae Stanciu	1	1	0	2
7	(Romania)	40	Dacian Varga	2	0	0	2
7	(Mozambique)	77	Eduardo Jumisse	2	0	0	2
7	(Brazil)	80	Wesley	2	0	0	2
13	(Brazil)	16	Cauê	1	0	0	1
13	(Bulgaria)	20	Zhivko Milanov	1	0	0	1
13	(Cyprus)	33	Elias Charalambous	1	0	0	1
13	(Senegal)	78	Ousmane N'Doye	1	0	0	1
			TOTALS	45	4	0	49

Penalties inflicted
Player	Pen.
(Cape Verde) Fernando Varela	2
(Romania) Liviu Antal	1
(Brazil) Cauê	1
(Romania) Lucian Sânmărtean	1

Penalties obtained
Player	Pen.
(Romania) Liviu Antal	3
(Bulgaria) Zhivko Milanov	1
(North Macedonia) Nderim Nexhipi	1
(Romania) Lucian Sânmărtean	1
(Cape Verde) Fernando Varela	1

=== Disciplinary record ===
No.	Pos	Name	Liga I			Cupa României			UEFA			Total		
No.	Pos	Name	Booked	(yellow card) (yellow-red card)	Sent off (straight red)	Booked	(yellow card) (yellow-red card)	Sent off (straight red)	Booked	(yellow card) (yellow-red card)	Sent off (straight red)	Booked	(yellow card) (yellow-red card)	Sent off (straight red)
3	DF	Fernando Varela	4	0	0	0	0	0	0	0	0	4	0	0
5	DF	Piotr Celeban	3	0	0	0	0	0	0	0	0	3	0	0
6	DF	Valter Heil	1	0	0	0	0	0	0	0	0	1	0	0
7	MF	Davide	1	0	0	0	0	0	0	0	0	1	0	0
8	MF	Liviu Antal	3	0	0	0	0	0	1	0	0	4	0	0
9	FW	Sabrin Sburlea	2	0	0	0	0	0	1	0	0	3	0	0
10	MF	Nicolae Stanciu	2	0	0	0	0	0	0	0	0	2	0	0
12	GK	Vytautas Černiauskas	1	0	0	0	0	0	0	0	0	1	0	0
16	MF	Cauê	6	1	0	0	0	0	0	0	0	6	1	0
18	MF	Lucian Sânmărtean	5	0	0	0	0	0	1	0	0	6	0	0
19	FW	Mike Temwanjera	4	0	0	0	0	0	0	0	0	4	0	0
20	DF	Zhivko Milanov	9	1	0	0	0	0	1	0	0	10	1	0
23	DF	Adrian Sălăgeanu	7	0	0	0	0	0	0	0	0	7	0	0
25	MF	Michael Tukura	1	0	0	0	0	0	0	0	0	1	0	0
28	DF	Gabriel Cânu	0	0	0	1	0	0	0	0	0	1	0	0
29	FW	Marius Niculae	1	0	0	0	0	0	0	0	0	1	0	0
30	MF	Raul Costin	4	0	0	0	0	0	0	0	0	4	0	0
33	DF	Elias Charalambous	3	0	0	0	0	0	0	0	0	3	0	0
40	MF	Dacian Varga	3	0	0	0	0	0	1	0	0	4	0	0
67	DF	Andrei Cordoş	1	0	0	0	0	0	1	0	0	2	0	0
70	MF	Nderim Nexhipi	1	0	0	0	0	0	0	0	0	1	0	0
77	MF	Eduardo Jumisse	6	0	0	0	0	0	0	0	0	6	0	0
78	MF	Ousmane N'Doye	4	0	0	0	0	0	1	0	0	5	0	0
88	MF	Vasile Buhăescu	6	0	0	0	0	0	0	0	0	6	0	0
		TOTALS	78	2	0	1	0	0	7	0	0	86	2	0

=== Overall ===
Games played	39 (34 Liga I, 2 UEFA Champions League, 2 UEFA Europa League, 1 Romanian Cup)
Games won	16 (16 Liga I)
Games drawn	12 (10 Liga I, 1 UEFA Champions League, 1 UEFA Europa League)
Games lost	11 (8 Liga I, 1 UEFA Champions League, 1 UEFA Europa League, 1 Romanian Cup)
Goals scored	54
Goals conceded	43
Goal difference	+11
Yellow cards	78
Red cards	2
Worst discipline	(Bulgaria) Zhivko Milanov (9 (yellow card) and 1 (yellow card) (yellow-red card) )
Best result	3–0 (H) v Petrolul Ploieşti – Liga I – 28 Jul 2012; 3–0 (A) v Gloria Bistriţa – Liga I – 18 Aug 2012; 3–0 (H) v Concordia Chiajna – Liga I – 29 Sep 2012; 3–0 (H) v CSMS Iaşi – Liga I – 26 Nov 2012; 4–1 (H) v Dinamo București – Liga I – 18 May 2013
Worst result	0–3 (A) v CFR Cluj – Liga I – 4 Aug 2012; 1–4 (H) v Fenerbahçe – Champions League – 8 Aug 2012
Most appearances	(Cape Verde) Fernando Varela (36 appearances) (Romania) Liviu Antal (36 appearances) (Romania) Nicolae Stanciu (36 appearances)
Top scorer	(Romania) Marius Niculae (12 goals)
Points	58/102 (56.86.%)

Last updated: 30 May 2013

==== Performances ====
Updated to games played on 30 May 2013.

	All								Home						Away					
	Pld	Pts	W	D	L	GF	GA	GD	W	D	L	GF	GA	GD	W	D	L	GF	GA	GD
League	34	58	16	10	8	50	33	+17	12	5	0	33	12	+21	4	5	8	17	21	-4
Overall	39	–	16	12	11	54	43	+11	12	5	3	34	19	+15	4	7	8	20	24	-4

==== Goal minutes ====
Updated to games played on 30 May 2013.

1'–15'	16'–30'	31'–HT	46'–60'	61'–75'	76'–FT	Extra time
2	8	12	9	9	14	0

=== International appearances ===
Player	Country	Appearances	Goals
Elias Charalambous	Cyprus	v. Bulgaria v. Albania v. Iceland v. Slovenia	
Marius Niculae	Romania	v. Slovenia v. Estonia	
Nicolae Stanciu	Romania U-21	v. Sweden U-21 v. Latvia U-21	
Fernando Varela	Cape Verde	v. Sierra Leone v. Tunisiav. Senegal v. Senegal	

== Liga I ==
=== League table ===
Pos	Team	Pld	W	D	L	GF	GA	GD	Pts	Qualification or relegation
3	Petrolul Ploiești	34	16	14	4	60	34	+26	62	Qualification to Europa League second qualifying round
4	Astra Giurgiu	34	17	9	8	64	37	+27	60	Qualification to Europa League first qualifying round (Note: Astra Giurgiu qualified for the first qualifying round of the 2013–14 UEFA Europa as Petrolul won the 2012–13 Cupa României and secured a place in the second qualifying round of the 2013–14 UEFA Europa.)
5	Vaslui	34	16	10	8	50	34	+16	58	
6	Dinamo București	34	16	8	10	48	40	+8	56	
7	Brașov	34	14	9	11	50	51	−1	51	

Source: Liga I (in Romanian)
Rules for classification: 1) points; 2) head-to-head points; 3) head-to-head goal difference; 4) head-to-head goals scored; 5) goal difference; 6) number of goals scored.

=== Results summary ===
Overall								Home						Away					
Pld	W	D	L	GF	GA	GD	Pts	W	D	L	GF	GA	GD	W	D	L	GF	GA	GD
34	16	10	8	50	33	+17	58	12	5	0	33	12	+21	4	5	8	17	21	−4

=== Results by round ===
Round	1	2	3	4	5	6	7	8	9	10	11	12	13	14	15	16	17	18	19	20	21	22	23	24	25	26	27	28	29	30	31	32	33	34
Ground	A	H	A	H	A	H	A	H	A	H	A	H	A	H	A	A	H	H	A	H	A	H	A	H	A	H	A	H	A	H	A	H	H	A
Result	D	W	L	D	W	W	D	W	L	W	D	W	L	W	W	L	W	W	D	D	L	D	L	W	L	D	D	W	L	D	W	W	W	W
Position	7	4	8	11	6	3	4	4	4	4	4	3	5	4	4	4	4	3	3	4	5	6	6	6	6	6	6	6	6	6	6	6	5	5

Updated to match(es) played on 30 May 2013. Source: LPF
A = Away; H = Home; W = Win; D = Draw; L = Loss

== Matches ==
=== Pre-season matches ===
20 June 2012	Vaslui	1–0	(Albania) Skënderbeu Korçë	St. Ulrich, Austria
19:00	Antal 40'	Report		Stadium: Sportplatz

24 June 2012	Vaslui	1–1	(Azerbaijan) Khazar Lankaran	Kössen, Austria
19:00	N'Doye 35'	Report	Bonfim 67'	Stadium: Kaiserwinkl

27 June 2012	Vaslui	1–2	(Russia) Terek Grozny	Kössen, Austria
19:00	Zsiga 85'	Report	Lebedenko 78'; Vlasov 88'	Stadium: Kaiserwinkl

1 July 2012	Vaslui	2–2	(Czech Republic) Sparta Prague	St. Ulrich, Austria
17:00	Antal 8'; Reis 12'	Report	Holek 10'; Matějovský 51'	Stadium: Sportplatz

4 July 2012	Vaslui	9–1	(Austria) Bischoffen	Bischofshofen, Austria
	Buhăescu ??', ??', ??', ??'; Stanciu ??'; Antal ??'; Cordoş ??'; Zsiga ??'; Targino ??'	Report	?? ??'	Stadium: Sportplatz

6 July 2012	Vaslui	0–1	United Arab Emirates	Linz, Austria
		Report	Ali 45'

7 July 2012	Vaslui	0–1	(Czech Republic) Slovan Liberec	Uttendorf, Austria
19:00		Report	?? 82'	Stadium: Sportplatz

11 July 2012	Vaslui	2–1	(Russia) FC Krasnodar	Kirchdorf in Tirol, Austria
17:00	Wesley 40', 72'	Report	Joãozinho 17'	Stadium: Leerberg-Arena

12 July 2012	Vaslui	0–0	(Saudi Arabia) Ittihad FC	Bischofshofen, Austria
19:00		Report		Stadium: Sportplatz

=== Inter-season matches ===
==== Copa del Sol ====
23 January 2013	Tromsø (Norway)	2–2 (3–4 p)	(Romania) Vaslui	La Manga, Spain
16:00 CET	Ondrášek 18', 24'	Report	Costin 49' (pen.); Antal 61'	Stadium: La Manga Stadium; Referee: Kristinn Jakobsson (Iceland)
	Penalties
	Skog (penalty scored); Prijović (penalty scored); Johnsen (penalty missed); Jenssen (penalty missed); Johansen (penalty scored)		(penalty missed) Jumisse; (penalty scored) Costin; (penalty scored) Charalambous; (penalty scored) Buhăescu; (penalty scored) Zsiga

26 January 2013	Vaslui (Romania)	1–0	(Norway) Molde	San Pedro del Pinatar, Spain
19:00 CET	Stanciu 36'	Report		Stadium: Pinatar Arena; Referee: Kristinn Jakobsson (Iceland)

30 January 2013	Vaslui (Romania)	0–4	(Denmark) København	San Pedro del Pinatar, Spain
19:00 CET		Report	Aaquist 7'; Santin 12'; Vetokele 20', 38'	Stadium: Pinatar Arena; Referee: Mattias Gestranius (Finland)

==== Friendlies ====
1 February 2013	Vaslui (Romania)	3–0	(China) Shanghai East Asia	San Pedro del Pinatar, Spain
14:00 CET	Milanov ??'; Popovici ??'; Nexhipi ??'	Report		Stadium: Pinatar Arena

8 February 2013	Vaslui (Romania)	CANCELLED	(Czech Republic) Slavia Prague	Belek, Turkey
17:00 CET		Report		Stadium: Cornelia Diamond Hotel

=== Liga I ===
22 July 2012 Matchday 1	Rapid București	2–2	Vaslui	București
21:30 EET	Pancu 45'; Teixeira 84'	Report	Wesley 31', 48'	Stadium: Valentin Stănescu; Attendance: 5 000; Referee: Marius Avram

28 July 2012 Matchday 2	Vaslui	3–0	Petrolul Ploieşti	Vaslui
21:30 EET	Sânmărtean 21'; Sburlea 70'; Niculae 82'	Report		Stadium: Municipal; Attendance: 8 000; Referee: Adrian Cojocaru

4 August 2012 Matchday 3	CFR Cluj	3–0	Vaslui	Cluj-Napoca
21:45 EET	Cadú 17' (pen.); Bastos 69', 83'	Report		Stadium: Dr. Constantin Rădulescu; Attendance: 11 000; Referee: Alexandru Tudor

12 August 2012 Matchday 4	Vaslui	0–0	Pandurii Târgu Jiu	Vaslui
19:30 EET		Report		Stadium: Municipal; Attendance: 5 000; Referee: Radu Petrescu

18 August 2012 Matchday 5	Gloria Bistriţa	0–3	Vaslui	Bistriţa
18:00 EET		Report	Milanov 37'; Niculae 48'; Sburlea 91'	Stadium: Gloria; Attendance: 3 500; Referee: Cristian Balaj

27 August 2012 Matchday 6	Vaslui	3–1	Steaua București	Vaslui
21:30 EET	Celeban 58'; Sânmărtean 83'; Niculae 88'	Report	Chipciu 51'	Stadium: Municipal; Attendance: 9 240; Referee: (Italy) Paolo Valeri

2 September 2012 Matchday 7	Viitorul Constanţa	2–2	Vaslui	Constanţa
22:45 EET	Iancu 10'; Dică 52' (pen.)	Report	Sânmărtean 34' (pen.); Celeban 88'	Stadium: Farul; Attendance: 5 000; Referee: Marius Avram

17 September 2012 Matchday 8	Vaslui	2–1	FC Severin	Vaslui
21:30 EET	Niculae 76'; N'Doye 91'	Report	Moutinho 88'	Stadium: Municipal; Attendance: 5 000; Referee: Cătălin Botaş

23 September 2012 Matchday 9	FC Brașov	2–1	Vaslui	Braşov
19:00 EET	Popa 11'; Batin 74'	Report	Varga 64'	Stadium: Silviu Ploeşteanu; Attendance: 3 000; Referee: Adrian Cojocaru

29 September 2012 Matchday 10	Vaslui	3–0	Concordia Chiajna	Vaslui
21:30 EET	Niculae 25', 32', 57'	Report		Stadium: Municipal; Attendance: 1 000; Referee: Lucian Ruşandu

5 October 2012 Matchday 11	Astra Giurgiu	1–1	Vaslui	Ploieşti
20:30 EET	Tembo 31'	Report	Varga 90+5' (pen.)	Stadium: Astra; Attendance: 3 000; Referee: Marian Balaci

21 October 2012 Matchday 12	Vaslui	1–0	Universitatea Cluj	Vaslui
19:00 EET	Niculae 22'	Report		Stadium: Municipal; Attendance: 4 000; Referee: Sebastian Colţescu

28 October 2012 Matchday 13	Gaz Metan Mediaş	1–0	Vaslui	Mediaş
19:00 EET	Astafei 27' (pen.)	Report		Stadium: Gaz Metan; Attendance: 3 000; Referee: Alexandru Tudor

3 November 2012 Matchday 14	Vaslui	4–3	Ceahlăul Piatra Neamţ	Vaslui
21:30 EET	Celeban 8', 59'; Cauê 33'; Niculae 35'	Report	Ichim 5'; Lukanović 51'; Achim 92'	Stadium: Municipal; Attendance: 1 500; Referee: Iulian Dima

10 November 2012 Matchday 15	Dinamo București	0–1	Vaslui	București
21:30 EET		Report	Sânmărtean 37'	Stadium: Dinamo; Attendance: 5 000; Referee: Marius Avram

19 November 2012 Matchday 16	Oţelul Galaţi	2–0	Vaslui	Galaţi
20:00 EET	Iorga 19'; Viglianti 93'	Report		Stadium: Oţelul; Attendance: 5 000; Referee: Paul Unimatan

26 November 2012 Matchday 17	Vaslui	3–0	CSMS Iaşi	Vaslui
19:00 EET	Varela 56'; Niculae 68', 91'	Report		Stadium: Municipal; Attendance: 5 000; Referee: Cristian Balaj

2 December 2012 Matchday 18	Vaslui	1–0	Rapid București	Vaslui
20:30 EET	Jumisse 30'	Report		Stadium: Municipal; Attendance: 2 500; Referee: Marcel Bârsan

8 December 2012 Matchday 19	Petrolul Ploieşti	0–0	Vaslui	Ploieşti
18:00 EET		Report		Stadium: Ilie Oană; Attendance: 10 000; Referee: Sebastian Colțescu

25 February 2013 Matchday 20	Vaslui	0–0	CFR Cluj	Vaslui
20:30 EET		Report		Stadium: Municipal; Attendance: 3 000; Referee: Ovidiu Hațegan

4 March 2013 Matchday 21	Pandurii Târgu Jiu	2–1	Vaslui	Târgu Jiu
19:30 EET	Matulevičius 56', 79'	Report	Jumisse 61'	Stadium: Stadionul Tudor Vladimirescu; Attendance: 4 000; Referee: Cristian Balaj

11 March 2013 Matchday 22	Vaslui	1–1	Gloria Bistriţa	Vaslui
21:30 EET	Sânmărtean 94' (pen.)	Report	C. Bucur 2'	Stadium: Municipal; Attendance: 1 000; Referee: Marcel Bârsan

17 March 2013 Matchday 23	Steaua București	1–0	Vaslui	București
20:00 EET	Chipciu 44'	Report		Stadium: Arena Națională; Attendance: 12 000; Referee: (Slovenia) Ivan Kružliak

1 April 2013 Matchday 24	Vaslui	3–2	Viitorul Constanţa	Vaslui
19:30 EET	Celeban 51', 87'; Antal 56'	Report	Dică 20'; Alibec 79'	Stadium: Municipal; Attendance: 1 000; Referee: Istvan Kovacs

5 April 2013 Matchday 25	FC Severin	2–0	Vaslui	Drobeta-Turnu Severin
20:30 EET	Hasanović 42'; Neacşa 81'	Report		Stadium: Municipal; Attendance: 500; Referee: Cristian Balaj

15 April 2013 Matchday 26	Vaslui	1–1	FC Brașov	Vaslui
19:00 EET	Charalambous 74'	Report	Danquah 4'	Stadium: Municipal; Attendance: 1 000; Referee: Adrian Cojocaru

21 April 2013 Matchday 27	Concordia Chiajna	1–1	Vaslui	Chiajna
19:30 EET	Welington 56'	Report	Buhăescu 28'	Stadium: Concordia; Attendance: 1 000; Referee: Istvan Kovacs

27 April 2013 Matchday 28	Vaslui	2–1	Astra Giurgiu	Vaslui
21:30 EET	Sânmărtean 43'; Temwanjera 81'	Report	Budescu 72' (pen.)	Stadium: Municipal; Attendance: 3 000; Referee: Sebastian Colţescu

4 May 2013 Matchday 29	Universitatea Cluj	2–1	Vaslui	Cluj-Napoca
20:30 EET	Buleică 34'; Nicola 39'	Report	Sânmărtean 70' (pen.)	Stadium: Cluj Arena; Attendance: 3 000; Referee: Ovidiu Haţegan

7 May 2013 Matchday 30	Vaslui	1–1	Gaz Metan Mediaş	Vaslui
19:00 EET	Buhăescu 19'	Report	Roman 80'	Stadium: Municipal; Attendance: 2 000; Referee: Iulian Dima

11 May 2013 Matchday 31	Ceahlăul Piatra Neamţ	0–2	Vaslui	Piatra Neamţ
20:30 EET		Report	Temwanjera 62'; Antal 75'	Stadium: Ceahlăul; Attendance: 2 000; Referee: Cristian Balaj

18 May 2013 Matchday 32	Vaslui	4–1	Dinamo București	Vaslui
21:30 EET	Antal 22'; Celeban 32'; Stanciu 59'; Temwanjera 89'	Report	Strătilă 28'	Stadium: Municipal; Attendance: 5 000; Referee: Ovidiu Haţegan

24 May 2013 Matchday 33	Vaslui	1–0	Oţelul Galaţi	Vaslui
19:00 EET	Antal 43'	Report		Stadium: Municipal; Attendance: 2 000; Referee: Marius Avram

30 May 2013 Matchday 34	CSMS Iaşi	1–2	Vaslui	Iaşi
18:00 EET	Mitrea 66'	Report	Antal 19'; Buhăescu 41'	Stadium: Emil Alexandrescu; Attendance: 4 000; Referee: Adrian Comănescu

=== UEFA Champions League ===
==== Third qualifying round ====
1 August 2012 First leg	Fenerbahçe (Turkey)	1–1	(Romania) Vaslui	Istanbul
21:45 EET	İrtegün 90'	Report	Antal 75'	Stadium: Şükrü Saracoğlu; Attendance: 38 993; Referee: (Spain) Mateu Lahoz

8 August 2012 Second leg	Vaslui (Romania)	1–4 (2–5 agg.)	(Turkey) Fenerbahçe	Piatra Neamţ
21:00 EET	M. Niculae 14'	Report	Erkin 12'; Kuyt 71', 76'; Sow 90+2'	Stadium: Ceahlăul; Attendance: 11 005; Referee: (Russia) Sergei Karasev

=== UEFA Europa League ===
==== Play-Off Round ====
23 August 2012 First Leg	Vaslui (Romania)	0–2	(Italy) Internazionale	Piatra Neamţ
21:45 EET		Report	Cambiasso 23'; Palacio 73'	Stadium: Ceahlăul; Attendance: 13 500; Referee: (Netherlands) Sebastiaan Nijhuis

30 August 2012 Second Leg	Internazionale (Italy)	2–2 (4–2 agg.)	(Romania) Vaslui	Milan
21:45 EET	Palacio 76'; Guarín 90+2'	Report	Stanciu 35' (pen.); Varela 79'	Stadium: San Siro; Attendance: 41 326; Referee: (Portugal) Bertino Miranda

=== Cupa României ===
26 September 2012 Round of 32	Vaslui	0–1	Botoşani	Vaslui
16:30 EET		Report	Bordeanu 65'	Stadium: Municipal; Attendance: 1 500; Referee: Marius Bocăneală
