= 2011–12 FC Vaslui season =

FC Vaslui
2011–12 season
- President: Daniel Stanciu
- Manager: Augusto Inácio
- Stadium: Municipal
- Liga I: 2nd
- Cupa României: Semi-finals (eliminated)
- UEFA Champions League: Third qualifying round (eliminated)
- UEFA Europa League: Group Stage (eliminated)
- Top goalscorer: League: Wesley (27 goals); All: Wesley (37 goals)
- Highest home attendance: 9,220 v Sportul Studenţesc; 13 May 2012
- Lowest home attendance: 3,000 v Petrolul Ploieşti; 30 July 2011

The 2011–12 season is the tenth season in FC Vaslui's existence, and its seventh in a row in Liga I. Though finished third last season, FC Vaslui qualified for the Third qualifying round in UEFA Champions League, following FC Timişoara's relegation.

== First-team squad ==
No.	Name	Age	Nat.	Since	T. Apps.	L. Apps.	C. Apps.	I. Apps.	T. Goals	L. Goals	C. Goals	I. Goals	Ends	Transfer fee	Notes
Goalkeepers
1	Milan Borjan	23	(Canada)	2012 (W)	19	16	3	0	0	0	0	0	2012	Loan	
12	Vytautas Černiauskas	22	(Lithuania)	2010	31	21	0	10	0	0	0	0	2015	Undisclosed	
89	Cătălin Straton	21	(Romania)	2012 (W)	0	0	0	0	0	0	0	0	2016	Undisclosed	
Defenders
3	Paul Papp	21	(Romania)	2009 (W)	91	74	9	8	6	6	0	0	2013	€0.05M	
4	Marius Constantin	26	(Romania)	2011	17	15	2	0	1	1	0	0	2014	Free	
14	Anderson do Ó	30	(Brazil)	2012 (W)	17	14	3	0	0	0	0	0	N/A	Undisclosed	
15	Richard Annang	20	(Ghana)	2010	10	6	1	3	0	0	0	0	N/A	Undisclosed	
17	Paíto	28	(Mozambique)	2012 (W)	16	13	3	0	1	1	0	0	N/A	Undisclosed	
20	Zhivko Milanov	26	(Bulgaria)	2010 (W)	92	74	6	12	1	0	0	1	2013	€0.35M	
21	Ionuţ Balaur	22	(Romania)	2007	16	10	2	4	1	1	0	0	N/A	Youth	
26	Pavol Farkaš	26	(Slovakia)	2009 (W)	79	59	7	13	2	2	0	0	2012	€0.2M	
27	Hugo Luz	29	(Portugal)	2008 (W)	81	69	6	6	2	2	0	0	N/A	Free	
28	Gabriel Cânu (captain)	30	(Romania)	2008	56	45	4	7	7	6	0	1	N/A	€0.36M	Injured
85	Gladstone	26	(Brazil)	2010 (W)	31	24	3	4	1	1	0	0	2013	Free	
Midfielders
5	Denis Zmeu	26	(Moldova)	2007 (W)	104	81	12	11	4	3	0	1	N/A	€0.2M	
8	Adrian Gheorghiu	29	(Romania)	2006	127	109	11	6	11	9	2	0	N/A	Undisclosed	
18	Lucian Sânmărtean	31	(Romania)	2010 (W)	96	76	8	12	5	4	1	0	2015	Free	
23	Sergiu Popovici	18	(Romania)	2012 (W)	0	0	0	0	0	0	0	0	N/A	Undisclosed	
30	Raul Costin	26	(Romania)	2009	98	78	10	10	8	5	3	0	2012	€0.1M	
31	Nicolae Stanciu	18	(Romania)	2011	19	16	3	0	1	1	0	0	2016	€0.2M	
78	Ousmane N'Doye	33	(Senegal)	2012 (W)	49	39	4	6	5	2	1	2	N/A	Free	
80	Wesley (vice-captain)	30	(Brazil)	2009 (W)	138	112	14	12	75	59	10	6	2013	€1.0M	
83	Jaime Bragança	28	(Portugal)	2012 (W)	2	2	0	0	0	0	0	0	2013	Free	
88	Vasile Buhăescu	23	(Romania)	2005	101	84	9	8	6	5	1	0	N/A	Youth	
Forwards
7	Savio Nsereko	21	(Germany)	2012 (W)	2	2	0	0	0	0	0	0	2012	Loan	
9	Yero Bello	23	(Nigeria)	2010	68	54	5	9	10	7	3	0	2013	€0.15M	
10	Adaílton	34	(Brazil)	2010	72	59	5	8	19	17	2	0	2012	Free	
19	Mike Temwanjera	29	(Zimbabwe)	2007 (W)	155	129	9	17	39	31	3	5	N/A	Undisclosed	

- T=Total
- L=Liga I
- C=Cupa României
- I=UEFA Europa League, Intertoto UEFA Cup

== Transfers ==
=== Summer ===
==== In ====
#	Pos	Player	From	Fee	Date	Source
4	DF	(Romania) Marius Constantin	Rapid București	Free	8-09-2011	Gazeta Sporturilor
88	MF	(Romania) Vasile Buhăescu	Petrolul Ploieşti	Loan return	1-07-2011	Obiectivul de Vaslui
31	MF	(Romania) Nicolae Stanciu	Unirea Alba Iulia	€240,000	9-09-2011	Adevarul

==== Out ====
#	Pos	Player	To	Fee	Date	Source
1	GK	(Slovakia) Dušan Kuciak	(Poland) Legia Warsaw	Free	29-07-2011	Gazeta Sporturilor
2	MF	(Spain) Alejandro Campano	(Spain) Xerez	Released	29-06-2011	ProSport
4	MF	(Bulgaria) Stanislav Genchev	(Bulgaria) Ludogorets Razgrad	End of contract	1-06-2011	Vremea Noua
6	DF	(Spain) David Rivas	(Spain) SD Huesca	Released	29-06-2011	ProSport
9	FW	(Cameroon) Christian Pouga	(Portugal) Marítimo	Free	5-07-2011	Gazeta Sporturilor

=== Winter ===
==== In ====
#	Pos	Player	From	Fee	Date	Source
1	GK	(Canada) Milan Borjan	(Turkey) Sivasspor	Loan	23-02-2012	Vremea Noua
7	FW	(Germany) Savio Nsereko	(Italy) Fiorentina	Undisclosed	20-01-2012	Vaslui FC
14	DF	(Brazil) Anderson do Ó	(Portugal) Vitória F.C.	Undisclosed	14-02-2012	Obiectivul de Vaslui
17	DF	(Mozambique) Paíto	(Switzerland) Neuchâtel Xamax	Undisclosed	7-02-2012	ProSport
23	MF	(Romania) Sergiu Popovici	(Romania) Flacăra Făget	Undisclosed	5-02-2012	Liga2
78	MF	(Senegal) Ousmane N'Doye	(Romania) Astra Ploiești	Free	1-03-2012	Vremea Noua
83	MF	(Portugal) Jaime Bragança	Free agent	Free	20-01-2012	Vaslui FC
89	GK	(Romania) Cătălin Straton	(Romania) Rapid București	Free	21-01-2012	ProSport

==== Out ====
#	Pos	Player	To	Fee	Date	Source
7	FW	(Romania) Răzvan Neagu	(Romania) Petrolul Ploieşti	Loan	21-01-2012	Vremea Noua
17	DF	(Romania) Silviu Bălace	(Romania) Gaz Metan Severin	Ended contract	31-12-2011	Gazeta de Sud
23	MF	(Serbia) Miloš Pavlović	(Romania) Rapid București	Free	21-01-2012	ProSport
25	MF	(Brazil) Gerlem	(Brazil) EC Vitória	Free	30-03-2012	Vremea Noua
33	GK	(Romania) Mihai Luca	(Romania) CSS Paşcani	Loan	26-03-2012	Vremea Noua

== Statistics ==
=== Appearances and goals ===
Last updated on 20 May 2012.

No.	Pos	Nat	Player	Total		Liga I		Europe		Cupa României	
No.	Pos	Nat	Player	Apps	Goals	Apps	Goals	Apps	Goals	Apps	Goals
1	GK	(Canada) CAN	Milan Borjan	19	-18	16	-12	0	0	3	-6
3	DF	(Romania) ROU	Paul Papp	36	1	24+1	1	6	0	5	0
4	DF	(Romania) ROU	Marius Constantin	17	1	15	1	0	0	2	0
5	MF	(Moldova) MDA	Denis Zmeu	21	2	10+4	1	4+1	1	2	0
7	FW	(Germany) GER	Savio Nsereko	2	0	0+2	0	0	0	0	0
8	MF	(Romania) ROU	Adrian Gheorghiu	16	1	3+8	0	0+1	0	2+2	1
9	FW	(Nigeria) NGR	Yero Bello	40	6	13+15	3	4+4	0	3+1	3
10	FW	(Brazil) BRA	Adaílton	42	8	29+1	6	8	0	3+1	2
12	GK	(Lithuania) LTU	Vytautas Černiauskas	27	-23	17	-14	10	-9	0	0
14	DF	(Brazil) BRA	Anderson do Ó	17	0	11+3	0	0	0	3	0
15	DF	(Ghana) GHA	Richard Annang	4	0	1	0	0+3	0	0	0
17	DF	(Mozambique) MOZ	Paíto	16	1	12+1	1	0	0	3	0
18	MF	(Romania) ROU	Lucian Sânmărtean	45	2	30+1	2	10	0	2+2	0
19	FW	(Zimbabwe) ZIM	Mike Temwanjera	40	9	26+4	7	7	2	1+2	0
20	DF	(Bulgaria) BUL	Zhivko Milanov	39	1	27	0	9+1	1	2	0
21	FW	(Romania) ROU	Ionuţ Balaur	15	1	6+3	1	4	0	2	0
26	DF	(Slovakia) SVK	Pavol Farkas	32	0	19	0	9+1	0	1+2	0
27	DF	(Portugal) POR	Hugo Luz	7	0	4+2	0	0	0	1	0
28	DF	(Romania) ROU	Gabriel Cânu	2	0	1	0	1	0	0	0
30	MF	(Romania) ROU	Raul Costin	38	2	13+14	1	3+4	0	2+2	1
31	MF	(Romania) ROU	Nicolae Stanciu	19	1	5+11	1	0	0	2+1	0
78	MF	(Senegal) SEN	Ousmane N'Doye	14	2	10+1	1	0	0	3	1
80	FW	(Brazil) BRA	Wesley	44	37	33	27	6	3	4+1	7
83	MF	(Portugal) POR	Jaime Bragança	2	0	0+2	0	0	0	0	0
85	DF	(Brazil) BRA	Gladstone	12	0	5+4	0	3	0	0	0
88	MF	(Romania) ROU	Vasile Buhăescu	21	3	3+10	2	1+5	0	2	1
Players sold or loaned out during the season
7	FW	(Romania) ROU	Răzvan Neagu	7	1	0+2	0	3	0	2	1
11	MF	(Serbia) SRB	Nemanja Milisavljević	24	0	13+2	0	6+2	0	1	0
17	DF	(Romania) ROU	Silviu Bălace	7	1	4	1	3	0	0	0
22	GK	(Romania) ROU	Claudiu Puia	4	-6	1	-3	0+1	-2	2	-1
23	MF	(Serbia) SRB	Miloš Pavlović	22	0	13	0	8	0	0+1	0
25	MF	(Brazil) BRA	Willian Gerlem	7	1	4+1	1	1+1	0	0	0
77	DF	(Bosnia and Herzegovina) BIH	Petar Jovanović	20	0	6+3	0	4+5	0	2	0

Converted penalties
Player	Pen.
(Brazil) Wesley	8

=== Top scorers ===
Position	Nation	Number	Name	Liga I	Europa League	Romanian Cup	Total
1	(Brazil)	80	Wesley	27	3	7	37
2	(Zimbabwe)	19	Mike Temwanjera	7	2	0	9
3	(Brazil)	10	Adaílton	6	0	2	8
4	(Nigeria)	9	Yero Bello	3	0	3	6
5	(Romania)	88	Vasile Buhăescu	2	0	1	3
6	(Romania)	18	Lucian Sânmărtean	2	0	0	2
6	(Moldova)	5	Denis Zmeu	1	1	0	2
6	(Romania)	30	Raul Costin	1	0	1	2
6	(Senegal)	78	Ousmane N'Doye	1	0	1	2
10	(Romania)	3	Paul Papp	1	0	0	1
10	(Romania)	4	Marius Constantin	1	0	0	1
10	(Romania)	17	Silviu Bălace	1	0	0	1
10	(Mozambique)	17	Paíto	1	0	0	1
10	(Romania)	21	Ionuţ Balaur	1	0	0	1
10	(Brazil)	25	Gerlem	1	0	0	1
10	(Romania)	31	Nicolae Stanciu	1	0	0	1
10	(Bulgaria)	20	Zhivko Milanov	0	1	0	1
10	(Romania)	7	Răzvan Neagu	0	0	1	1
10	(Romania)	8	Adrian Gheorghiu	0	0	1	1
/	/	/	Own Goals	1	0	0	1
			TOTALS	58	7	17	82

Penalties inflicted
Player	Pen.
(Romania) Ionuţ Balaur	2
(Bulgaria) Zhivko Milanov	2
(Brazil) Adaílton	1
(Brazil) Gladstone	1
(Canada) Milan Borjan	1

Penalties obtained
Player	Pen.
(Nigeria) Yero Bello	2
(Bulgaria) Zhivko Milanov	2
(Brazil) Wesley	2
(Romania) Lucian Sânmărtean	1
(Zimbabwe) Mike Temwanjera	1

=== Disciplinary record ===
R	No.	Pos	Nat	Name	Liga I			UEFA			Romanian Cup			Total		
R	No.	Pos	Nat	Name	Yellow card	(yellow card) (yellow-red card)	Red card	Yellow card	(yellow card) (yellow-red card)	Red card	Yellow card	(yellow card) (yellow-red card)	Red card	Yellow card	(yellow card) (yellow-red card)	Red card
1	20	DF	(Bulgaria)	Zhivko Milanov	9	2	0	3	0	0	1	0	0	13	2	0
2	3	DF	(Romania)	Paul Papp	7	2	0	4	0	0	1	0	0	12	2	0
3	23	MF	(Serbia)	Miloš Pavlović	8	0	1	3	0	0	0	0	0	11	0	1
4	80	MF	(Brazil)	Wesley	3	0	0	3	0	1	3	0	0	9	0	1
5	18	MF	(Romania)	Lucian Sânmărtean	6	0	0	3	0	0	0	0	0	9	0	0
6	10	FW	(Brazil)	Adaílton	4	0	0	1	0	0	2	1	0	7	1	0
7	4	DF	(Romania)	Marius Constantin	5	0	0	0	0	0	1	0	0	6	0	0
7	19	FW	(Zimbabwe)	Mike Temwanjera	3	0	0	3	0	0	0	0	0	6	0	0
7	21	DF	(Romania)	Ionuţ Balaur	4	0	0	2	0	0	0	0	0	6	0	0
7	30	MF	(Romania)	Raul Costin	4	0	0	2	0	0	0	0	0	6	0	0
11	9	FW	(Nigeria)	Yero Bello	3	0	0	1	0	0	1	0	0	5	0	0
12	31	MF	(Romania)	Nicolae Stanciu	3	0	0	0	0	0	1	0	0	4	0	0
12	77	DF	(Bosnia and Herzegovina)	Petar Jovanović	2	0	0	2	0	0	0	0	0	4	0	0
12	85	DF	(Brazil)	Gladstone	2	0	0	2	0	0	0	0	0	4	0	0
15	5	MF	(Moldova)	Denis Zmeu	1	0	0	2	0	0	0	0	0	3	0	0
15	11	MF	(Serbia)	Nemanja Milisavljević	2	0	0	1	0	0	0	0	0	3	0	0
15	12	GK	(Lithuania)	Vytautas Černiauskas	2	0	0	1	0	0	0	0	0	3	0	0
15	14	DF	(Brazil)	Anderson	1	0	0	0	0	0	2	0	0	3	0	0
15	78	MF	(Senegal)	Ousmane N'Doye	1	0	0	0	0	0	2	0	0	3	0	0
20	7	FW	(Romania)	Răzvan Neagu	0	0	0	1	0	0	1	0	0	2	0	0
20	17	DF	(Mozambique)	Paíto	1	0	0	0	0	0	1	0	0	2	0	0
20	25	MF	(Brazil)	Gerlem	1	0	0	1	0	0	0	0	0	2	0	0
20	88	MF	(Romania)	Vasile Buhăescu	1	0	0	1	0	0	0	0	0	2	0	0
24	27	DF	(Portugal)	Hugo Luz	0	0	1	0	0	0	0	0	0	0	0	1
25	1	GK	(Canada)	Milan Borjan	1	0	0	0	0	0	0	0	0	1	0	0
25	8	MF	(Romania)	Adrian Gheorghiu	1	0	0	0	0	0	0	0	0	1	0	0
25	15	DF	(Ghana)	Richard Annang	0	0	0	1	0	0	0	0	0	1	0	0
25	17	DF	(Romania)	Silviu Bălace	1	0	0	0	0	0	0	0	0	1	0	0
25	26	DF	(Slovakia)	Pavol Farkaš	1	0	0	0	0	0	0	0	0	1	0	0
25	83	MF	(Portugal)	Jaime Bragança	1	0	0	0	0	0	0	0	0	1	0	0
				TOTALS	78	4	2	37	0	1	16	1	0	131	5	3

=== Overall ===
Games played	49 (34 Liga I, 2 UEFA Champions League, 8 UEFA Europa League, 5 Cupa României)
Games won	27 (22 Liga I, 2 UEFA Europa League, 3 Cupa României)
Games drawn	8 (4 Liga I, 1 UEFA Champions League, 3 UEFA Europa League)
Games lost	14 (8 Liga I, 1 UEFA Champions League, 3 UEFA Europa League, 2 Cupa României)
Goals scored	82
Goals conceded	45
Goal difference	+37
Yellow cards	139
Red cards	6
Worst discipline	(Bulgaria) Zhivko Milanov with 14 yellow cards and 2 red cards
Best result	8-0 (H) v Voinţa Livezile – Cupa României – 22 Sep 2011
Worst result	0-3 (A) v Rapid – Liga I – 22 Jul 2011
Most appearances	(Romania) Lucian Sânmărtean with 45 appearances
Top scorer	(Brazil) Wesley (37 goals)
Points	70/102 (68.62.%)

Last updated: 20 May 2012

==== Performances ====
Updated to games played on 20 May 2012.

	All								Home						Away					
	Pld	Pts	W	D	L	GF	GA	GD	W	D	L	GF	GA	GD	W	D	L	GF	GA	GD
League	34	70	22	4	8	58	29	+29	11	3	3	32	11	+21	11	1	5	26	18	+8
Overall	49	–	27	8	14	82	45	+37	15	6	4	49	15	+34	12	2	10	33	32	+1

==== Goal minutes ====
Updated to games played on 20 May 2012.

1'–15'	16'–30'	31'–HT	46'–60'	61'–75'	76'–FT	Extra time
11	10	15	14	15	16	0

== Liga I ==
The fixtures for the 2011–12 season were announced on 7 July, with an early Liga I title contender clash against Rapid București in the opening match, for the second year in a row.

On 22 July, Vaslui travelled to București to suffer a 0–3 defeat in the Liga I opening match. Two goals from Ciprian Deac and Romeo Surdu and a late goal from Ovidiu Herea saw the club starting the season from the last place in the league. Zhivko Milanov also received the first red card of the season, identical with the opening match from the previous season. Since Rapid's stadium was suspended for the incidents created by fans during the last match of the 2010–11 season, the match was played on Regie.

22 July 2011 Matchday 1	Rapid București	3–0	Vaslui	București
18:30 EET	Deac 8'; Surdu 34'; Herea 87'	Report		Stadium: Regie; Attendance: 0 Referee: Ovidiu Haţegan

Vaslui played their first home league match against new promoted team Petrolul Ploieşti on 30 July. The match finished 0–0, most notable being Wesley's captain appointment, following Gabriel Cânu's long-term injury from the UEFA Champions League's qualifying match against FC Twente.

30 July 2011 Matchday 2	Vaslui	0–0	Petrolul Ploieşti	Vaslui
22:00 EET		Report		Stadium: Municipal; Attendance: 3 000; Referee: Adrian Comănescu

On 14 August, Vaslui faced Concordia Chiajna on its third match. Wesley took the lead with a header in the 33rd minute, managing Vaslui's first goal from the 2011–12 campaign. However, he was substituted three minutes before the end of the first half due to an injury. With two late goals from Silviu Bălace and Denis Zmeu, Vaslui managed its first win from the new season. It was also striker Ionuţ Balaur's debut as a central defender, since both Paul Papp and Gabriel Cânu were injured.

13 August 2011 Matchday 3	Concordia Chiajna	0–3	Vaslui	Chiajna
21:30 EET		Report	Wesley 33'; Bălace 87'; Zmeu 92'	Stadium: Concordia; Attendance: 1 500; Referee: Augustus Constantin

One week later, Vaslui faced a third new promoted team Ceahlăul Piatra Neamţ. The game was goal-less at half-time, with both teams having trouble to find the net. Slowly Vaslui started building confidence, and finally a goal by Mike Temwanjera from a cross by Nemanja Milisavljević put Vaslui ahead in the score. However, two unexpected late goals from Ceahlăul's Eugeniu Cebotaru and Vlad Achim led to a 2–1 defeat, counting Vaslui's second loss in the league.

21 August 2011 Matchday 4	Vaslui	1–2	Ceahlăul Piatra Neamţ	Vaslui
20:00 EET	Temwanjera 60'	Report	Cebotaru 80'; Achim 90'	Stadium: Municipal; Attendance: 5 000; Referee: Sebastian Colţescu

After a successful qualification in the UEFA Europa League group stages, Vaslui travelled to the Silviu Ploeşteanu Stadium in Braşov to take on the local team, on 28 August. The hosts took the lead in the 31st minute, when Marian Cristescu fed Alexandru Chipciu inside the box and the winger scored with a right-footed strike towards the left corner of Černiauskas's goal. Brasov's joy didn't last too long, since Gerlem equalized one minute later after he dribbled Majerník and put the ball past Felgueiras. In the 56th minute, Wesley played the ball through for Temwanjera, who beat Felgueiras with a low shot into the bottom corner, putting Vaslui ahead. The game eventually ended 2–1, Vaslui winning for the first time in their history on Braşov's home ground.

28 August 2011 Matchday 5	FC Brașov	1–2	Vaslui	Braşov
16:00 EET	Chipciu 31'	Report	Gerlem 33'; Temwanjera 56'	Stadium: Silviu Ploeşteanu; Attendance: 4 000; Referee: Alexandru Tudor

=== League table ===
Pos	Team	Pld	W	D	L	GF	GA	GD	Pts	Qualification or relegation
1	CFR Cluj (C)	34	21	8	5	63	31	+32	71	Qualification to Champions League third qualifying round
2	Vaslui	34	22	4	8	58	29	+29	70	Qualification to Champions League third qualifying round
3	Steaua București	34	19	9	6	47	26	+21	66	Qualification to Europa League third qualifying round
4	Rapid București	34	18	10	6	54	29	+25	64	Qualification to Europa League second qualifying round
5	Dinamo București	34	18	8	8	57	32	+25	62	Qualification to Europa League play-off round (Note: Dinamo București won the 2011–12 Cupa României so it qualified for the 2012–13 UEFA Europa League play-off round.)

Source: LPF (in Romanian)
Rules for classification: 1st points; 2nd overall goals difference; 3rd overall goals scored (until the end of the season)
(C) Champions

=== Results summary ===
Overall								Home						Away					
Pld	W	D	L	GF	GA	GD	Pts	W	D	L	GF	GA	GD	W	D	L	GF	GA	GD
34	22	4	8	58	29	+29	70	11	3	3	32	11	+21	11	1	5	26	18	+8

=== Results by round ===
Round	1	2	3	4	5	6	7	8	9	10	11	12	13	14	15	16	17	18	19	20	21	22	23	24	25	26	27	28	29	30	31	32	33	34
Ground	A	H	A	H	A	H	A	H	A	H	A	H	A	H	A	H	A	H	A	H	A	H	A	H	A	H	A	H	A	H	A	H	A	H
Result	L	D	W	L	W	W	L	W	W	D	L	W	D	W	L	W	W	L	W	W	W	L	W	D	L	W	W	W	W	W	W	W	W	W
Position	18	14	9	12	9	7	9	6	5	6	7	6	8	5	8	5	4	7	5	5	5	5	3	3	5	5	4	4	3	2	1	1	2	2

Updated to match(es) played on 20 May 2012. Source: LPF
A = Away; H = Home; W = Win; D = Draw; L = Loss

== Matches ==
=== Friendlies ===
The Austria training camp

3 July 2011	Vaslui	4–2	(Turkey) Manisaspor	Waidring
19:45	Wesley 12', 25'; Cânu 50'; Gheorghiu 84'	Report	Akaminko 20'; Kahê 57'

5 July 2011	Vaslui	1–1	(Czech Republic) Sparta Prague	Waidring
19:00	Neagu 63'	Report	Pavelka 35' (pen.)

8 July 2011	Vaslui	0–2	(Germany) Wacker Burghausen	Waidring
19:30		Report	Cinar 24'; Grübl 77'

10 July 2011	Vaslui	3–0	(Russia) Spartak Moscow	Waidring
18:00	Wesley 39' (pen.); Costin 63'; Temwanjera 73'	Report

14 July 2011	Vaslui	1–1	(Bulgaria) Ludogorets Razgrad	Waidring
19:00	Zmeu 80'	Report	Bakalov 39'

The Antalya training camp

27 January 2012	Vaslui	1–1	(Azerbaijan) Qarabağ	Antalya
16:00	Wesley 50' (pen.)	Report	??? 68'

29 January 2012	Vaslui	1–2	(Poland) Jagiellonia Białystok	Antalya
16:00	Wesley 8'	Report	??? (??) ??? (??)

=== Liga I ===
22 July 2011 Matchday 1	Rapid București	3–0	Vaslui	București
18:30 EET	Deac 8'; Surdu 34'; Herea 87'	Report		Stadium: Regie; Attendance: 0 Referee: Ovidiu Haţegan

30 July 2011 Matchday 2	Vaslui	0–0	Petrolul Ploieşti	Vaslui
22:00 EET		Report		Stadium: Municipal; Attendance: 3 000; Referee: Adrian Comănescu

13 August 2011 Matchday 3	Concordia Chiajna	0–3	Vaslui	Chiajna
21:30 EET		Report	Wesley 33'; Bălace 87'; Zmeu 92'	Stadium: Concordia; Attendance: 1 500; Referee: Augustus Constantin

21 August 2011 Matchday 4	Vaslui	1–2	Ceahlăul Piatra Neamţ	Vaslui
20:00 EET	Temwanjera 60'	Report	Cebotaru 80'; Achim 90'	Stadium: Municipal; Attendance: 5 000; Referee: Sebastian Colţescu

28 August 2011 Matchday 5	FC Brașov	1–2	Vaslui	Braşov
16:00 EET	Chipciu 31'	Report	Gerlem 33'; Temwanjera 56'	Stadium: Silviu Ploeşteanu; Attendance: 4 000; Referee: Alexandru Tudor

11 September 2011 Matchday 6	Vaslui	3–1	Dinamo București	Vaslui
21:30 EET	Temwanjera 42'; Wesley 44'; Sânmărtean 74'	Report	Stoica 41'	Stadium: Municipal; Attendance: 7 000; Referee: Robert Dumitru

19 September 2011 Matchday 7	CFR Cluj	2–0	Vaslui	Cluj-Napoca
21:30 EET	Cadú 70' (pen.); Weldon 72'	Report		Stadium: Dr. Constantin Rădulescu; Attendance: 6 000; Referee: Augustus Constantin

25 September 2011 Matchday 8	Vaslui	2–0	Voinţa Sibiu	Vaslui
19:00 EET	Wesley 36', 87'	Report		Stadium: Municipal; Attendance: 5 000; Referee: Emil Voicu

3 October 2011 Matchday 9	CS Mioveni	0–5	Vaslui	Mioveni
21:30 EET		Report	Wesley 9', 62', 77'; Adaílton 26', 48'	Stadium: Dacia; Attendance: 3 000; Referee: Marius Avram

16 October 2011 Matchday 10	Vaslui	0–0	Steaua București	Vaslui
21:30 EET		Report		Stadium: Municipal; Attendance: 7 000; Referee: Cristian Balaj

24 October 2011 Matchday 11	Astra Ploieşti	1–0	Vaslui	Ploieşti
18:00 EET	Ţigănaşu 87'	Report		Stadium: Astra; Attendance: 500; Referee: Ovidiu Haţegan

30 October 2011 Matchday 12	Vaslui	4–0	FCM Târgu Mureş	Vaslui
18:30 EET	Bello 4'; Wesley 60', 64', 70'	Report		Stadium: Municipal; Attendance: 3 000; Referee: Lucian Ruşandu

7 November 2011 Matchday 13	Gaz Metan Mediaş	1–1	Vaslui	Mediaş
20:45 EET	Bud 82'	Report	Marković 45' (o.g.)	Stadium: Gaz Metan; Attendance: 500; Referee: Sebastian Colţescu

20 November 2011 Matchday 14	Vaslui	3–2	Pandurii Târgu Jiu	Vaslui
16:00 EET	Buhăescu 18'; Wesley 41' (pen.); Balaur 93'	Report	Nistor 59'; Batin 92'	Stadium: Municipal; Attendance: 4 000; Referee: Robert Dumitru

26 November 2011 Matchday 15	Sportul Studenţesc	1–0	Vaslui	București
14:00 EET	Dobre 16'	Report		Stadium: Regie; Attendance: 300; Referee: Istvan Kovacs

4 December 2011 Matchday 16	Vaslui	1–0	Oţelul Galaţi	Vaslui
18:00 EET	Wesley 11'	Report		Stadium: Municipal; Attendance: 6 000; Referee: Alexandru Tudor

10 December 2011 Matchday 17	Universitatea Cluj	0–1	Vaslui	Cluj-Napoca
18:00 EET		Report	Adaílton 85'	Stadium: Cluj Arena; Attendance: 6 000; Referee: Alexandru Tudor

20 December 2011 Matchday 18	Vaslui	2–3	Rapid București	Vaslui
20:30 EET	Wesley 13'; Adaílton 63'	Report	Deac 35', 40'; Grigore 90+2'	Stadium: Municipal; Attendance: 4 000; Referee: Istvan Kovacs

4 March 2012 Matchday 19	Petrolul Ploieşti	1–2	Vaslui	Ploieşti
19:30 EET	Buhuşi 17'	Report	Wesley 63' (pen.); Stanciu 88'	Stadium: Stadionul Ilie Oană; Attendance: 1,330; Referee: Ovidiu Hategan

9 March 2012 Matchday 20	Vaslui	4–0	Concordia Chiajna	Vaslui
19:00 EET	Wesley 13'; Adaílton 34'; Paíto 43'; Sânmărtean 64'	Report		Stadium: Municipal; Attendance: 3 000; Referee: Lucian Rusandu

19 March 2012 Matchday 21	Ceahlăul Piatra Neamţ	1–3	Vaslui	Piatra Neamţ
20:30 EET	Golubović 84'	Report	Wesley 11' (pen.), 28', 72'	Stadium: Ceahlăul; Attendance: 3 000; Referee: Adrian Cojocaru

22 March 2012 Matchday 22	Vaslui	0–1	FC Brașov	Vaslui
19:00 EET		Report	Buga 45'	Stadium: Municipal; Attendance: 3 000; Referee: Paul Unimatan

25 March 2012 Matchday 23	Dinamo București	0–1	Vaslui	București
21:30 EET		Report	Bello 57'	Stadium: Dinamo; Attendance: 5 000; Referee: Alexandru Tudor

2 April 2012 Matchday 24	Vaslui	1–1	CFR Cluj	Vaslui
21:30 EET	Wesley 22'	Report	Ronny 14'	Stadium: Municipal; Attendance: 9 000; Referee: Alexandru Tudor

7 April 2012 Matchday 25	Voinţa Sibiu	3–0	Vaslui	Sibiu
14:00 EET	Beza 39'; Popa 48'; Lukanović 75'	Report		Stadium: Municipal; Attendance: 5 000; Referee: Adrian Cojocaru

15 April 2012 Matchday 26	Vaslui	3–0	CS Mioveni	Vaslui
19:00 EET	Wesley 18' (pen.), 80'; Costin 65'	Report		Stadium: Municipal; Attendance: 3 500; Referee: Cătălin Botaş

20 April 2012 Matchday 27	Steaua București	0–1	Vaslui	București
20:20 EET		Report	Wesley 59'	Stadium: Ghencea; Attendance: 25 000; Referee: (Serbia) Milorad Mažić

28 April 2012 Matchday 28	Vaslui	2–1	Astra Ploieşti	Vaslui
19:00 EET	N'Doye 55'; Constantin 85'	Report	Amorim 32'	Stadium: Municipal; Attendance: 8 000; Referee: Iulian Dima

2 May 2012 Matchday 29	FCM Târgu Mureş	2–3	Vaslui	Târgu Mureș
18:00 EET	Apostu 45'; Farkaš 60' (o.g.)	Report	Wesley 11', 74'; Temwanjera 39'	Stadium: Trans-Sil; Attendance: 5 000; Referee: Adrian Cojocaru

7 May 2012 Matchday 30	Vaslui	4–0	Gaz Metan Mediaş	Vaslui
21:30 EET	Adaílton 17'; Temwanjera 24', 48', 64'	Report		Stadium: Municipal; Attendance: 7 000; Referee: Radu Petrescu

10 May 2012 Matchday 31	Pandurii Târgu Jiu	1–2	Vaslui	Târgu Jiu
20:00 EET	Voiculeţ 21'	Report	Wesley 76' (pen.); Papp 85'	Stadium: Tudor Vladimirescu; Attendance: 7 000; Referee: Robert Dumitru

13 May 2012 Matchday 32	Vaslui	1–0	Sportul Studenţesc	Vaslui
19:30 EET	Wesley 60'	Report		Stadium: Municipal; Attendance: 9 220; Referee: Alexandru Tudor

16 May 2012 Matchday 33	Oţelul Galaţi	1–2	Vaslui	Galaţi
21:30 EET	S. Costin 20'	Report	Wesley 14' (pen.); Bello 23'	Stadium: Oţelul; Attendance: 7 000; Referee: (Bulgaria) Nikolay Yordanov

20 May 2012 Matchday 34	Vaslui	1–0	Universitatea Cluj	Vaslui
20:00 EET	Buhăescu 60'	Report		Stadium: Municipal; Referee: Marius Avram

=== UEFA Champions League ===
==== Third qualifying round ====
26 July 2011	FC Twente (Netherlands)	2–0	(Romania) Vaslui	Arnhem
21:45	Janko 34' (pen.), 57'	Report		Stadium: GelreDome; Attendance: 12 800; Referee: (Croatia) Ivan Bebek

3 August 2011	Vaslui (Romania)	0–0 (0–2 agg.)	(Netherlands) FC Twente	Piatra Neamţ
20:45		Report		Stadium: Ceahlăul; Attendance: 5 280; Referee: (France) Fredy Fautrel

=== UEFA Europa League ===
==== Play-off round ====
18 August 2011	Vaslui (Romania)	2–0	(Czech Republic) Sparta Prague	Piatra Neamţ
19:00 EET	Temwanjera 13'; Milanov 37'	Report		Stadium: Ceahlăul; Attendance: 5 170; Referee: (Hungary) Zsolt Szabo

25 August 2011	Sparta Prague (Czech Republic)	1–0 (1–2 agg.)	(Romania) Vaslui	Prague
21:00 EET	Pamić 59'	Report		Stadium: Generali Arena; Attendance: 13 699; Referee: (Austria) Thomas Einwaller

==== Group stage ====
Pos	Team	Pld	W	D	L	GF	GA	GD	Pts	Qualification	SCP	LAZ	VAS	ZÜR
1	(Portugal) Sporting CP	6	4	0	2	8	4	+4	12	Advance to knockout phase	—	2–1	2–0	2–0
2	(Italy) Lazio	6	2	3	1	7	5	+2	9	Advance to knockout phase	2–0	—	2–2	1–0
3	(Romania) Vaslui	6	1	3	2	5	8	−3	6		1–0	0–0	—	2–2
4	(Switzerland) Zürich	6	1	2	3	5	8	−3	5		0–2	1–1	2–0	—

Source: Soccerway

15 September 2011	Lazio (Italy)	2–2	(Romania) Vaslui	Rome
20:00 EET	Cissé 35' (pen.); Sculli 71'	Report	Wesley 59', 63' (pen.)	Stadium: Stadio Olimpico; Attendance: 13,913; Referee: (Netherlands) Eric Braamhaar

29 September 2011	Vaslui (Romania)	2–2	(Switzerland) Zürich	Piatra Neamţ
22:05 EET	Wesley 62' (pen.); Temwanjera 76'	Report	Alphonse 32'; Mehmedi 79'	Stadium: Ceahlăul; Attendance: 3,000; Referee: (Israel) Menashe Masiah

20 October 2011	Sporting CP (Portugal)	2–0	(Romania) Vaslui	Lisbon
22:05 EET	Evaldo 43'; Fernández 70'	Report		Stadium: Estádio José Alvalade; Attendance: 28,106; Referee: (France) Clément Turpin

3 November 2011	Vaslui (Romania)	1–0	(Portugal) Sporting CP	Piatra Neamţ
20:00 EET	Zmeu 30'	Report		Stadium: Ceahlăul; Attendance: 4 000; Referee: (Iceland) Kristinn Jakobsson

1 December 2011	Vaslui (Romania)	0–0	(Italy) Lazio	Piatra Neamţ
22:05 EET		Report		Stadium: Ceahlăul; Attendance: 7 000; Referee: (Serbia) Milorad Mažić

14 December 2011	Zürich (Switzerland)	2–0	(Romania) Vaslui	Zürich
20:00 EET	Margairaz 69'; Buff 90'	Report		Stadium: Letzigrund; Referee: (Russia) Maksim Layushkin

=== Cupa României ===
22 September 2011 Round of 32	Vaslui	8–0	Voinţa Livezile	Vaslui
20:00 EET	Gheorghiu 8'; Bello 23', 42', 83'; Buhăescu 40'; Costin 80'; Wesley 81', 86'	Report		Stadium: Municipal; Attendance: 5 000; Referee: Cristian Sava

27 October 2011 Round of 16	Vaslui	4–1	Dunărea Galaţi	Vaslui
14:00 EET	Wesley 38'; Neagu 55'; Adaílton 56', 71'	Report	Chelaru 19'	Stadium: Municipal; Attendance: 4 000; Referee: Sebastian Colţescu

15 March 2012 Quarterfinals	Oţelul Galaţi	2–3	Vaslui	Galaţi
21:30 EET	Antal 65'; Iorga 67' (pen.)	Report	Wesley 45+2', 62'; N'Doye 84'	Stadium: Oţelul; Attendance: 8 000; Referee: Cătălin Popa

28 March 2012 Semifinals	Vaslui	0–1	Rapid București	Vaslui
20:00 EET		Report	Herea 72' (pen.)	Stadium: Municipal; Attendance: 7 000; Referee: Marius Avram

11 April 2012 Semifinals	Rapid București	3–2	Vaslui	București
21:30 EET	Grigore 1'; Alexa 64'; Roman 89'	Report	Wesley 6', 47'	Stadium: Giuleşti-Valentin Stănescu; Attendance: 2 500; Referee: Marius Avram

== Awards ==
Ceremony	Honour	Winner
Fanatik Awards	Midfielder of the Year	(Romania) Lucian Sânmărtean
Fanatik Awards	Foreign Player of the Year	(Brazil) Wesley
Fanatik Awards	Professional Man of the Year	(Romania) Viorel Hizo
LPF and FRF Awards	Romanian Footballer of the Year	(Romania) Lucian Sânmărtean
LPF and FRF Awards	Foreign Player of the Year	(Brazil) Wesley
Gazeta Sporturilor Awards	Foreign Player of the Year	(Brazil) Wesley
Gazeta Sporturilor Awards	Romanian Footballer of the Year	(Romania) Lucian Sânmărtean (2nd)
Gazeta Sporturilor Awards	Foreign Player of the Year	(Brazil) Adaílton (2nd)
ProSport Awards	Romanian Footballer of the Year	(Romania) Lucian Sânmărtean
ProSport Awards	Foreign Player of the Year	(Brazil) Wesley
DSJT Vaslui Awards	Footballer of the Year	(Romania) Ionuţ Balaur
Top Gazeta Team of the Year (First Part of the Season)	Right Midfielder	(Brazil) Adaílton
Top Gazeta Team of the Year (First Part of the Season)	Left Midfielder	(Romania) Lucian Sânmărtean
Top Gazeta Team of the Year (First Part of the Season)	Forward	(Brazil) Wesley
ProSport Team of the Year (First Part of the Season)	Central Defender	(Slovenia) Pavol Farkaš
ProSport Team of the Year (First Part of the Season)	Left Back	(Serbia) Nemanja Milisavljević
ProSport Team of the Year (First Part of the Season)	Central Midfielder	(Brazil) Wesley
ProSport Team of the Year (First Part of the Season)	Left Midfielder	(Romania) Lucian Sânmărtean
LPF	Liga I Golden Boot	(Brazil) Wesley
Top Gazeta Team of the Year	Goalkeeper	(Canada) Milan Borjan
Top Gazeta Team of the Year	Forward	(Brazil) Wesley
Top Gazeta Team of the Year	Manager	(Portugal) Augusto Inácio
ProSport Team of the Year	Right Defender	(Bulgaria) Zhivko Milanov
ProSport Team of the Year	Right Midfielder	(Brazil) Adaílton
ProSport Team of the Year	Central Midfielder	(Brazil) Wesley
ProSport Team of the Year	Left Midfielder	(Romania) Lucian Sânmărtean
