= José Marçal =

Portuguese footballer

Personal information
- Full name: José Marçal da Silva Lago
- Date of birth: 20 August 1993 (age 33)
- Place of birth: Fafe, Portugal
- Position: Goalkeeper

Team information
- Current team: São Martinho

Youth career
- 2003–2009: Ases S. Jorge
- 2009–2012: Fafe

Senior career*
Years	Team	Apps	(Gls)
2012–2017	Fafe	84	(0)
2017–2018	Camacha	12	(0)
2018–2019	Arões	32	(0)
2019	Vila Real	5	(0)
2019–2020	Arões	15	(0)
2020–2021	São Martinho	23	(0)
2021–	Berço	1	(0)
- * Club domestic league appearances and goals as of 6 September 2021

José Marçal da Silva Lago (born 20 August 1993 in Fafe) is a Portuguese footballer who plays for São Martinho, as a goalkeeper.

== Club career ==
On 6 August 2016, Marçal made his professional debut with Fafe in a 2016–17 LigaPro match against Braga B.
