= Sreten =

Sreten (Cyrillic script: Сретен) is a Serbian and Montenegrin masculine given name of Slavic origin. It may refer to:

- Sreten Asanović (born 1931), writer
- Sreten Jocić (born 1962), gangster
- Sreten Lukić (born 1955), policeman
- Sreten Mirković (born 1958), boxer
- Sreten Ninković (born 1972), long distance runner
- Sreten Sretenović (born 1985), footballer
- Sreten Stanić (born 1984), footballer
- Sreten Stojanović (1898–1960), sculptor
- Sreten Žujović (1899–1976), politician

== See also ==
- Sretenović
