= Sretenović =

Sretenović (Cyrillic script: Сретеновић) is a Serbian patronymic surname derived from a masculine given name Sreten. It may refer to:

- Jovana Sretenović (born 1986), football player
- Sreten Sretenović (born 1985), football player
- Zoran Sretenović (born 1964), basketball player and coach
