= Edson Mucuana =

Mozambican footballer (born 2003)

Personal information
- Full name: Edson Joelder Lobo Mucuana
- Date of birth: 12 December 2003 (age 22)
- Place of birth: Maputo, Mozambique
- Height: 1.67 m (5 ft 6 in)
- Position: Winger

Team information
- Current team: Caldas
- Number: 21

Youth career
- Imortal
- Alta de Lisboa
- 2018–2019: C.F. Benfica
- 2019: Os Belenenses
- 2020: Torreense
- 2020–2021: Amora
- 2021–2022: Vilafranquense

Senior career*
Years	Team	Apps	(Gls)
2022–2023	Vilafranquense	3	(0)
2023–2025	AVS	1	(0)
2023–2024	→ Oliveira do Hospital (loan)	10	(0)
2024–2025	→ Marinhense (loan)	19	(3)
2026	Oriental	12	(2)
2026–	Caldas	5	(2)

International career^{‡}
2023	Mozambique U20	3	(0)
2025–	Mozambique	1	(0)
- * Club domestic league appearances and goals as of 13 September 2026 ‡ National team caps and goals as of 4 September 2023

Edson Joelder Lobo Mucuana (born 12 December 2003) is a Mozambican professional footballer who plays as a winger for Portuguese Liga 3 club Caldas and the Mozambique national team.

== Club career ==
Mucuana was included in Vilafranquense's squad for 2021–22 pre-season. However, he would have to wait until the following season to make his professional debut.

Prior to the 2023–24 season, Vilafranquense's SAD moved to Aves and rebranded as AVS Futebol SAD.

On 4 September 2023, AVS sent Mucuana on a season-long loan to Liga 3 side Oliveira do Hospital. On 3 September 2024, he joined Marinhense also on loan. On 2 September 2025, Mucuana's contract was terminated by mutual agreement and he left AVS.

On 16 January 2026, after over four months as a free agent, Mucuana joined Campeonato de Portugal side Oriental.

== International career ==
Mucuana was called up to the Mozambique under-20 squad for the first time in October 2022. He was called up for the 2023 Africa U-20 Cup of Nations.

On 29 September 2026, Mucuana made his debut for the Mozambique national team in an AFCON qualifier against Sudan.

== Personal life ==
Mucuana is the son of former professional footballer Paíto.

== Career statistics ==
=== Club ===
As of match played 28 May 2023

Appearances and goals by club, season and competition
Club	Season	League			National cup		League cup		Total	
Club	Season	Division	Apps	Goals	Apps	Goals	Apps	Goals	Apps	Goals
Vilafranquense	2022–23	Liga Portugal 2	3	0	1	0	1	0	4	0
AVS	2023–24	Liga Portugal 2	0	0	0	0	0	0	0	0
Oliveira do Hospital (loan)	2023–24	Liga 3	0	0	0	0	—		0	0
Career total			3	0	1	0	1	0	4	0
