= Petar Jovanović (footballer) =

Serbian footballer

Personal information
- Date of birth: 12 July 1982 (age 44)
- Place of birth: Tuzla, SR Bosnia and Herzegovina, SFR Yugoslavia
- Height: 1.82 m (6 ft 0 in)
- Position: Right-back

Youth career
- –2001: Radnički Stobex

Senior career*
Years	Team	Apps	(Gls)
2001–2005	Radnički Stobex	55	(6)
2004	→ Čukarički (loan)	10	(1)
2005	→ Sloboda Užice (loan)	12	(5)
2005–2012	Vaslui	76	(4)
2007	→ Mladenovac (loan)	13	(2)
2009	→ Politehnica Iași (loan)	15	(1)
2009–2010	→ Sevojno (loan)	24	(0)
2010	→ Sloboda Užice (loan)	13	(0)
2012	CSMS Iași	11	(0)
2013	Jedinstvo Užice	15	(4)
2013–2014	Radnički Niš	23	(1)
2014–2015	Universitatea Cluj	18	(0)
2015	Voždovac	17	(0)
2016	Rad	32	(0)
2017	Čukarički	30	(1)
2018–2019	Mladost Lučani	44	(0)
2019	Zlatibor Čajetina	21	(0)
2020–2021	Mladost Lučani	38	(0)
2021	Zlatibor Čajetina	3	(0)
2022–2024	Sloboda Užice	36	(0)
Total		506	(25)
- * Club domestic league appearances and goals

Petar Jovanović (Serbian Cyrillic: Петар Јовановић; born 12 July 1982) is a Serbian former professional footballer who played as a right-back.

== Career ==
In the summer of 2005, Jovanović moved to Romania and signed with Liga I newcomers Vaslui. He spent the next seven years at the club, including loan spells to Mladenovac, Politehnica Iași, Sevojno, and Sloboda Užice. In June 2012, Jovanović was acquired by newly promoted Liga I side CSMS Iași. He subsequently moved to Serbian First League club Jedinstvo Užice in the 2013 winter transfer window.

In July 2013, Jovanović signed for Serbian SuperLiga side Radnički Niš, alongside his former Vaslui teammate Marko Ljubinković. He later returned to Romania and signed with Liga I club Universitatea Cluj in June 2014. However, they suffered relegation that season.

In the summer of 2015, Jovanović made a return to Serbia and joined Voždovac. He then spent a year with Rad (2016) and Čukarički (2017). In January 2018, Jovanović signed with Mladost Lučani. He also briefly played for Zlatibor Čajetina in late 2019, before returning to Mladost Lučani in early 2020.

== Career statistics ==
Appearances and goals by club, season and competition
Club	Season	League			National Cup (Note: Includes Serbian Cup, Cupa României)		Continental		Other		Total	
Club	Season	Division	Apps	Goals	Apps	Goals	Apps	Goals	Apps	Goals	Apps	Goals
Radnički Stobex	2001–02	Second League of FR Yugoslavia	12	0			—		—		12	0
Radnički Stobex	2002–03	Second League of Serbia and Montenegro	19	2			—		—		19	2
Radnički Stobex	2003–04	Serbian League	11	0			—		—		11	0
Radnički Stobex	2004–05	Serbian League	13	4			—		—		13	4
Radnički Stobex	Total		55	6			—		—		55	6
Čukarički (loan)	2003–04	Second League of Serbia and Montenegro	10	1	—		—		—		10	1
Sloboda Užice (loan)	2004–05	Serbian League	12	5	—		—		—		12	5
Vaslui	2005–06	Divizia A	26	2	1	0	—		—		27	2
Vaslui	2006–07	Liga I	5	0	1	0	—		—		6	0
Vaslui	2007–08	Liga I	23	2	1	0	—		—		24	2
Vaslui	2008–09	Liga I	13	0	1	0	3 (Note: One appearance in UEFA Intertoto Cup, two appearances in UEFA Cup)	0	—		17	0
Vaslui	2011–12	Liga I	9	0	2	0	9 (Note: Two appearances in UEFA Champions League, seven appearances in UEFA Europa League)	0	—		20	0
Vaslui	Total		76	4	6	0	12	0	—		94	4
Mladenovac (loan)	2006–07	Serbian First League	13	2	—		—		—		13	2
Politehnica Iași (loan)	2008–09	Liga I	15	1	—		—		—		15	1
Sevojno (loan)	2009–10	Serbian First League	24	0	0	0	—		—		24	0
Sloboda Užice (loan)	2010–11	Serbian SuperLiga	13	0	1	0	—		—		14	0
CSMS Iași	2012–13	Liga I	11	0	0	0	—		—		11	0
Jedinstvo Užice	2012–13	Serbian First League	15	4	—		—		—		15	4
Radnički Niš	2013–14	Serbian SuperLiga	23	1	0	0	—		—		23	1
Universitatea Cluj	2014–15	Liga I	18	0	3	0	—		2 (Note: Appearances in Cupa Ligii)	0	23	0
Voždovac	2015–16	Serbian SuperLiga	17	0	0	0	—		—		17	0
Rad	2015–16	Serbian SuperLiga	14	0	—		—		—		14	0
Rad	2016–17	Serbian SuperLiga	18	0	1	0	—		—		19	0
Rad	Total		32	0	1	0	—		—		33	0
Čukarički	2016–17	Serbian SuperLiga	13	0	3	0	—		—		16	0
Čukarički	2017–18	Serbian SuperLiga	17	1	2	0	—		—		19	1
Čukarički	Total		30	1	5	0	—		—		35	1
Mladost Lučani	2017–18	Serbian SuperLiga	11	0	3	0	—		—		14	0
Mladost Lučani	2018–19	Serbian SuperLiga	33	0	3	1	—		—		36	1
Mladost Lučani	Total		44	0	6	1	—		—		50	1
Zlatibor Čajetina	2019–20	Serbian First League	21	0	1	0	—		—		22	0
Mladost Lučani	2019–20	Serbian SuperLiga	7	0	1	0	—		—		8	0
Mladost Lučani	2020–21	Serbian SuperLiga	31	0	2	0	—		—		33	0
Mladost Lučani	Total		38	0	3	0	—		—		41	0
Zlatibor Čajetina	2021–22	Serbian First League	3	0	0	0	—		—		3	0
Sloboda Užice	2021–22	Serbian League	?	?	—		—		—		?	?
Sloboda Užice	2022–23	Serbian First League	18	0	0	0	—		—		18	0
Sloboda Užice	2023–24	Serbian First League	18	0	1	0	—		—		19	0
Sloboda Užice	Total		36	0	1	0	—		—		37	0
Career total			506	25	26	1	12	0	2	0	547	26

== Honours ==
Čukarički

- Second League of Serbia and Montenegro: 2003–04

Vaslui

- UEFA Intertoto Cup: 2008

Universitatea Cluj

- Cupa României runner-up: 2014–15

Mladost Lučani

- Serbian Cup runner-up: 2017–18

Sloboda Užice

- Serbian League West: 2021–22
