= Vasile Buhăescu =

Romanian footballer

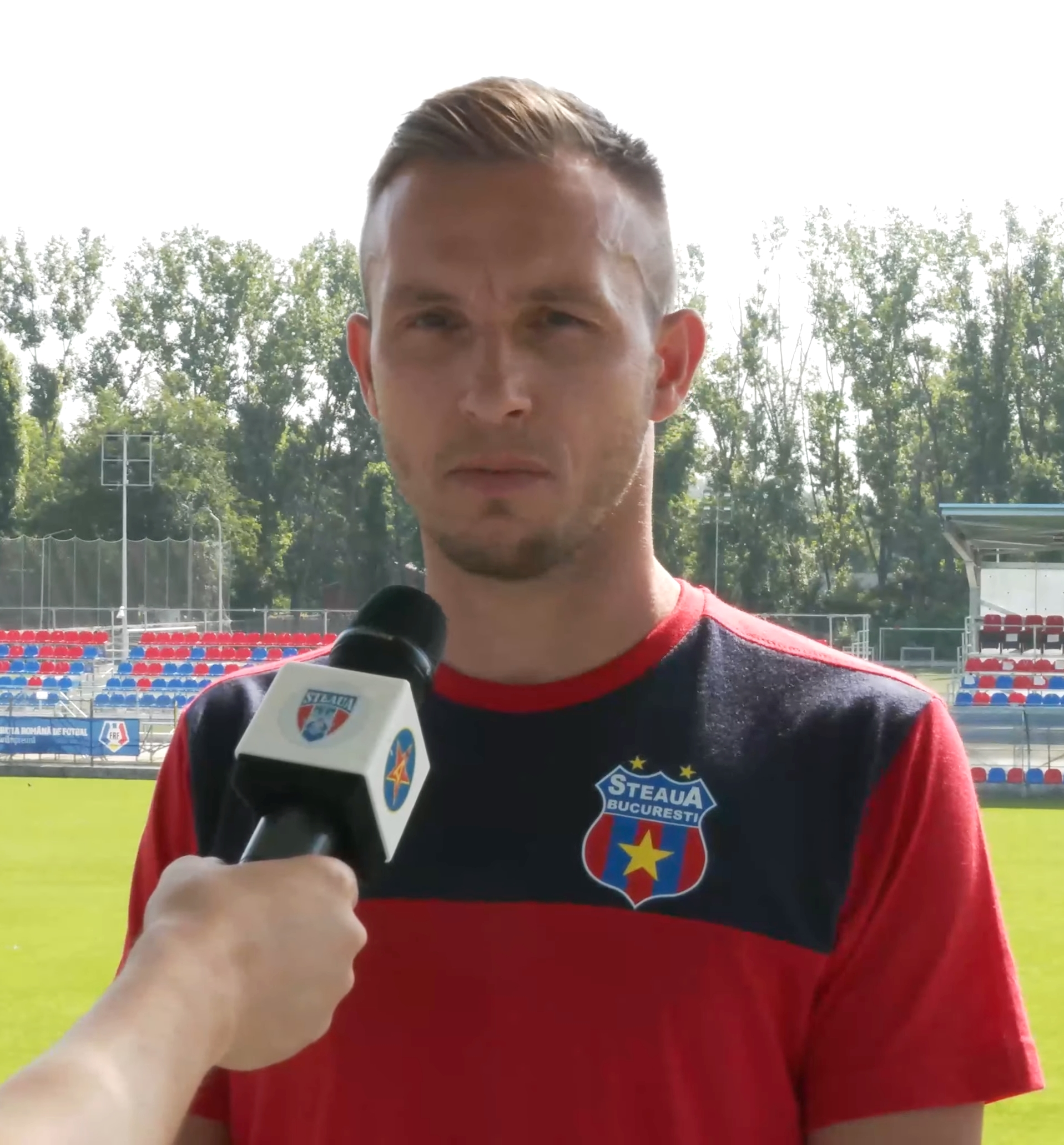
- Vasile Buhăescu in 2021

Personal information
- Date of birth: 2 February 1988 (age 38)
- Place of birth: Huși, Romania
- Height: 1.86 m (6 ft 1 in)
- Position: Striker

Team information
- Current team: CSM Vaslui
- Number: 21

Youth career
- 1995–2004: FCM Huși

Senior career*
Years	Team	Apps	(Gls)
2005	FCM Huși	?	(?)
2005–2014	FC Vaslui	104	(8)
2010	→ Concordia Chiajna (loan)	12	(5)
2011	→ Petrolul Ploiești (loan)	13	(5)
2013–2014	→ ASA Târgu Mureș (loan)	22	(2)
2014–2015	Metalul Reșița	25	(9)
2015	Mioveni	8	(1)
2016	Olimpia Satu Mare	17	(7)
2016–2017	Juventus București	36	(14)
2017–2020	Argeș Pitești	92	(33)
2020–2021	Petrolul Ploiești	20	(8)
2021–2022	Steaua București	23	(6)
2022–2023	Dinamo București	13	(3)
2023–	CSM Vaslui	21	(9)

International career^{‡}
2006–2007	Romania U-19	5	(3)
2009	Romania U-21	1	(0)
- * Club domestic league appearances and goals as of 09:52, 22 November 2024 (UTC) ‡ National team caps and goals as of 11 September 2009

Vasile Buhăescu (born 2 February 1988) is a Romanian professional footballer who plays as a striker for Liga III side CSM Vaslui.

== Club career ==
He started his career at the second team of the Vaslui, FCM Huși, but in October 2005, he was selected by Mircea Rednic to play in the first team. His first match was against Pandurii Târgu-Jiu, and he was seen then as a great star. In his first season he failed to score a goal.

In the next season, he started playing more, and at the final season, he played 24 games.

At the beginning of the new season, he was linked by FCSB, but Adrian Porumboiu rejected the 1 million offer, saying that in a few years he would be worth four times as much. He started in the first 11 in the new season, but because of his injuries, he failed to play more than ten games. His only goal in this season was in a draw, against UTA Arad.

Because of his lack of matches, he was loaned to Concordia Chiajna in winter 2010, for free. In 2011, he was loaned to CSMS Iași and Petrolul Ploiești. He helped Petrolul gain promotion to Liga I. In the summer of 2011 he returned to FC Vaslui. In the 2011/2012 season he helped FC Vaslui to qualify for the first time ever in the Europa League group stages. In the same season he scored two goals in Liga I.

In 2021, he joined CSA Steaua București.

== Honours ==
FC Vaslui

- UEFA Intertoto Cup: 2008

Petrolul Ploiești

- Liga II: 2010–11

Juventus București

- Liga II: 2016–17

== Career statistics ==
=== Club ===
Club	Season	League		Cup		Europe		Other		Total	
Club	Season	Apps	Goals	Apps	Goals	Apps	Goals	Apps	Goals	Apps	Goals
Vaslui	2005–06	15	0	1	0	0	0	0	0	16	0
Vaslui	2006–07	26	2	1	0	0	0	0	0	27	2
Vaslui	2007–08	15	1	1	0	0	0	0	0	16	1
Vaslui	2008–09	11	0	2	0	2	0	0	0	15	0
Vaslui	2009–10	4	0	2	0	0	0	0	0	6	0
Vaslui	2011–12	13	2	2	1	6	0	0	0	21	3
Vaslui	2012–13	17	3	0	0	2	0	0	0	19	3
Vaslui	2013–14	3	0	0	0	0	0	0	0	3	0
Vaslui	Total	104	8	9	1	10	0	0	0	123	9
Concordia Chiajna	2009–10	12	5	0	0	0	0	0	0	12	5
Concordia Chiajna	Total	12	5	0	0	0	0	0	0	12	5
Petrolul Ploiești	2010–11	13	5	0	0	0	0	0	0	13	5
Petrolul Ploiești	Total	13	5	0	0	0	0	0	0	13	5
ASA Târgu Mureș	2013–14	22	2	1	0	0	0	0	0	23	2
ASA Târgu Mureș	Total	22	2	1	0	0	0	0	0	23	2
Metalul Reșița	2014–15	25	9	1	0	0	0	0	0	26	9
Metalul Reșița	Total	25	9	1	0	0	0	0	0	26	9
Mioveni	2015–16	8	0	1	0	0	0	0	0	9	0
Mioveni	Total	8	0	1	0	0	0	0	0	9	0
Olimpia Satu Mare	2015–16	17	7	0	0	0	0	0	0	17	7
Olimpia Satu Mare	Total	17	7	0	0	0	0	0	0	17	7
Juventus București	2016–17	4	3	0	0	0	0	0	0	4	3
Juventus București	Total	4	3	0	0	0	0	0	0	4	3
Career Total		205	40	12	1	10	0	0	0	227	41

Statistics accurate as of match played 27 August 2016
