= Dionisio Cabrera =

Uruguayan footballer (born 1986)

Personal information
- Full name: Dionisio Damian Cabrera Hornos
- Date of birth: 17 November 1986 (age 39)
- Place of birth: Montevideo, Uruguay
- Height: 1.90 m (6 ft 3 in)
- Position: Attacking midfielder

Team information
- Current team: Arões

Senior career*
Years	Team	Apps	(Gls)
2005	Club Plaza	4	(0)
2005–2006	FC Vaslui	1	(0)
2006–2007	Compostela		
2007	Moreirense	1	(0)
2008	Pampilhosa	4	(0)
2008	Artur Rego		
2009	Compostela	9	(0)
2010–2011	Neves		
2011–2013	Varzim	12	(0)
2013–2014	Varzim B	14	(3)
2014–2015	Neves	28	(12)
2015–2018	Arões (Note: The statistics for the 2016–17 season are unavailable.)	50	(6)
2018–2019	Caçadores das Taipas	4	(0)
2019–	Arões	18	(2)
- * Club domestic league appearances and goals

Dionisio Damian Cabrera Hornos (born 17 November 1986) is a Uruguayan footballer who plays for Arões as a midfielder.
