= Igor de Lima =

Brazilian footballer (born 1980)

Personal information
- Full name: Igor Nóbrega de Lima
- Date of birth: 28 March 1980 (age 46)
- Place of birth: Brazil
- Height: 1.77 m (5 ft 10 in)
- Position: Attacking midfielder

Senior career*
Years	Team	Apps	(Gls)
2000	Treze		
2001	ABC		
2002	Treze		
2002	XV de Piracicaba		
2003	Americano		
2003–2005	Sheriff Tiraspol	23	(3)
2004–2005	→ Sheriff-2 Tiraspol (loan)	2	(1)
2005	FC Vaslui	4	(0)
2009	CSP		
2009–2010	Queimadense		
2010	Cruzeiro PB		
2011	Grêmio Serrano		
Total		29	(4)
- * Club domestic league appearances and goals

Igor Nóbrega de Lima (born 28 March 1980), known simply as Igor de Lima, is a Brazilian former footballer who played as a midfielder.

== Honours ==
Sheriff Tiraspol

- Moldovan National Division: 2003–04, 2004–05
- Moldovan Super Cup: 2004, 2005
