= Ilie Baicu =

Romanian footballer

Personal information
- Full name: Ilie Nico Baicu
- Date of birth: 5 December 1974 (age 51)
- Place of birth: Stâlpeni, Romania
- Height: 1.70 m (5 ft 7 in)
- Position: Left back

Senior career*
Years	Team	Apps	(Gls)
1993–2003	Forestierul Stâlpeni		
2003	Dacia Mioveni	13	(1)
2004	Argeș Pitești	38	(1)
2005	Dacia Mioveni	4	(0)
2005–2006	Vaslui	24	(1)
2006–2008	Dacia Mioveni	61	(9)
2008–2009	Internațional	13	(0)
2009–2012	Mioveni	70	(2)
2012–2014	SCM Pitești	21	(1)
2017–2019	AS Colibași	63	(53)
Total		307	(68)
- * Club domestic league appearances and goals as of 12:04, 15 June 2021 (UTC)

Ilie Nico Baicu (born 5 December 1974) is a Romanian former footballer who played as a left back for teams such as Dacia Mioveni, FC Argeș Pitești or FC Vaslui. He made 116 appearances in Liga I.
