= Silviu Bălace =

Romanian footballer

Personal information
- Full name: Silviu Constantin Bălace
- Date of birth: 13 November 1978 (age 47)
- Place of birth: Caracal, Romania
- Height: 1.71 m (5 ft 7 in)
- Positions: Left back; left winger

Youth career
- Universitatea Craiova

Senior career*
Years	Team	Apps	(Gls)
1997–2002	Universitatea Craiova	9	(0)
1998–1999	→ Chindia Târgoviște (loan)	8	(0)
1999–2000	→ Electro-Bere Craiova (loan)	2	(0)
2000–2001	→ Rocar București (loan)	22	(0)
2002	CSM Reșița	13	(1)
2003–2006	Politehnica Timișoara	108	(11)
2007	Dinamo București	9	(0)
2007–2011	FC Vaslui	67	(3)
2010	→ FC U Craiova (loan)	15	(0)
2012	CS Turnu Severin	18	(2)
2012–2015	Poli Timișoara	38	(2)
Total		301	(19)

Managerial career
- 2019–2021: Poli Timișoara
- * Club domestic league appearances and goals as of 30 May 2015

Silviu Constantin Bălace (born 13 November 1978) is a Romanian retired professional footballer and currently a manager. Although primarily a left back, Bălace has played as a left winger as well and is known for his overlapping runs on the left side, his pace and his technical ability.

== Club career ==
=== Early years ===
Born in Caracal, Bălace started out as a trainee at Universitatea Craiova. On 24 May 1997, he made his first team debut, coming as a substitute in a 2–0 loss against Ceahlăul Piatra Neamț. Shortly after, when he was 18 years old, Bălace suffered an ankle fracture which kept him out from the field for almost a year and a half. After he recovered he was sent out on loan to Chindia Târgoviște in 1999 in order to gain experience. In January 2001, Bălace was loaned out to Rocar București for twelve months. Following his third failed attempt to establish himself in the first team, Bălace signed a contract with Divizia B team CSM Reșița.

=== Poli AEK Timișoara ===
Following his successful short spell in Reșița, Bălace signed in January 2003 with newly promoted Divizia A side Poli AEK Timișoara. His league debut for his new team, was on 16 April, in the local derby against UTA Arad, coming as a substitute for Romeo Stancu. He ended his first season goalless, in which Timișoara eventually remained in the top flight, after winning the play-off against Gloria Buzău.

Usually used as a left back, under the management of Basarab Panduru, Bălace established himself as Timișoara's first choice left winger. On 1 November 2003, he scored his first league goal for Timișoara, in a 3–0 win against Brașov. On 9 April 2004, he assisted at probably Timișoara's most humiliating loss from their history, a 1–8 loss on their own field against Steaua București. Following his successful spell in Timișoara, despite his team's up and down season, the Viola fans nicknamed Bălace "Nedved from Banat" due to his Pavel Nedved lookalike. His nickname was taken over by Dinamo fans who called him "Nedved from Stefan cel Mare", but also by Vaslui fans with "Nedved from Vaslui".

On 11 August 2004, he captained Timișoara for the first time, in a 1–2 loss against FCM Bacău. On 4 August 2005, Bălace played against Pavel Nedved, in a 2–2 friendly match against Juventus Torino. The unexpected departure of Moldovan in mid-2006 led to Bălace being awarded club captaincy. Despite he was one of the most beloved players from Timișoara's history, Bălace was put on the transfer list in mid-2007, due to a conflict with Marian Iancu.

=== Dinamo ===
Following a conflict with Timișoara's boss Marian Iancu, on 19 December 2006, Bălace signed a three-and-a-half-year contract with Dinamo București with a reported transfer fee of €200,000. On 14 February, he made his first team debut for Dinamo, playing in the startup team against Benfica in UEFA Cup. His league debut for Dinamo was twelve days later, coming as a substitute for Vojislav Vranjković and providing his first assist for Cătălin Munteanu's only goal against Jiul Petroșani. Although he helped his team winning the championship after a three-year break, Bălace was put on the transfer list, following unsatisfying performances.

=== FC Vaslui ===
Following an unsuccessful spell at Dinamo, Bălace moved to Vaslui for $350,000 in June 2007. He established himself immediately as Vaslui's first choice left-back. Bălace made his competitive debut for Vaslui against UTA Arad in a 2–2 draw on 27 July 2007. Bălace scored his first goal for Vaslui on 5 August 2007 in a league match win against his former club Dinamo București. The final score was 2–0, with Bălace scoring Vaslui's first with a header from Dorinel Munteanu's corner. On 30 March 2008, he alongside teammates Sorin Frunză and Daniel Sabou were accused by Adrian Porumboiu of fixing a match against Steaua București. As a consequence, all three players were relegated to Vaslui's satellite. Despite they were all back in the first team five days later, due to lack of evidence, all three were dropped from the startup team, until the rest of the season.

On 19 July 2008, Bălace received a red card, in Vaslui's opening match against Neftchi Baku, failing afterwards to reestablish himself as Vaslui's first choice left back. He played his second match of the season on 2 October, in a match against Slavia Prague, as a late substitute for Hugo Luz. On 6 October, he was in the startup team against FC Brașov, playing as a left midfielder, following N'Doye's suspension from yellow card accumulation. He was until the rest of the season the second choice left back, managing to play only when Hugo Luz was either suspended or injured.

On 30 July 2009, Bălace was in the startup team against Omonia Nicosia, following Hugo Luz's injury. Although it seemed he managed to reestablish himself as Vaslui's first choice left back, on 13 September he received a red card against Rapid Bucuresti, making him Vaslui's third choice left back. On 1 February 2010, he was loaned out to Universitatea Craiova, for the rest of the season. When asked about Vaslui and Timișoara's quest to claim their first national title, Bălace said that "I would rather Timișoara won the national title, although I'm still under contract with Vaslui". He missed a single match for Universitatea, due to the yellow card accumulation, and helped his team to avoid the relegation. At the end of the season, despite his expressed wish to remain in Craiova, he eventually returned to Vaslui.

Once with Juan López Caro's appointment, Bălace didn't get a single chance to play in the first team. On 4 September 2010, Bălace led his team's training program, following Caro's conflict with the team's owner. Bălace has been reinstated as Vaslui's first choice left back, after the arrival of new manager Viorel Hizo, in his third sting as Vaslui boss. On 15 May 2011, Bălace scored his first league goal since September 2007, in a match against Sportul Studențesc at Municipal. The final score was 4–2, with Bălace scoring Vaslui's first with a header from Nemanja Milisavljević's cross. In his fourth season in Vaslui, he finished third with his team, for the second year in a row.

On 3 August 2011, Bălace was considered Vaslui's best player by Twente's manager, who stated "I enjoyed how Vaslui's Bălace played, thus being our number one danger. He won many one-on-one duels with our Ruiz". On 19 August, following Cânu and Wesley's injuries, Bălace captained Vaslui for the first time, leading his team to a 2–0 win in Europa League against Sparta Prague. Following Vaslui's qualification into the group stages, Porumboiu raised each player's wage up to 50%, meaning that Bălace's contract is now up to €180,000 per year.

== Career honours ==
Dinamo București

- Liga I: 2006–07

FC Vaslui

- UEFA Intertoto Cup: 2008

ACS Poli Timișoara

- Liga II: 2014–15
