= Alin Rațiu =

Romanian footballer

Alin Robert Rațiu
Personal information
- Full name: Alin Robert Rațiu
- Date of birth: 14 September 1982 (age 44)
- Place of birth: București, Romania
- Height: 1.86 m (6 ft 1 in)
- Position: Centre back

Senior career*
Years	Team	Apps	(Gls)
2001–2007	Sportul Studenţesc	100	(5)
2007–2009	Politehnica Timişoara	9	(0)
2008	→ CS Buftea (loan)	10	(0)
2009	→ Gloria Buzau (loan)	8	(0)
2009–2010	→ Internaţional (loan)	9	(0)
2010–2012	Sportul Studenţesc	27	(0)
2013–2014	Universitatea Cluj	15	(0)
Total		178	(5)
- * Club domestic league appearances and goals as of 19 July 2014

Alin Robert Rațiu (born 14 September 1982 in Bucharest) is a Romanian former football player, who played as a defender.
