= George Șoltuz =

Romanian footballer

Personal information
- Date of birth: 2 October 1977 (age 49)
- Place of birth: București, Romania
- Height: 1.83 m (6 ft 0 in)
- Position: Centre back

Senior career*
Years	Team	Apps	(Gls)
1999–2000	Fulgerul Bragadiru	15	(0)
2001	Rocar București	1	(0)
2001–2002	AEK București	14	(1)
2002–2007	Politehnica Timişoara	62	(0)
2005	→ FC Vaslui (loan)	3	(0)
2006	→ Jiul Petroşani (loan)	8	(0)
2007	Gloria Bistriţa	4	(0)
2008	Universitatea Cluj	9	(0)
2008–2009	Voinţa Domneşti	–	(–)
2009–2010	Săgeata Stejaru	5	(0)
- * Club domestic league appearances and goals as of 24 January 2008

George Șoltuz (born 2 October 1977) is a former Romanian football player.
