= Michael Tukura =

Nigerian footballer

Mike Tukura
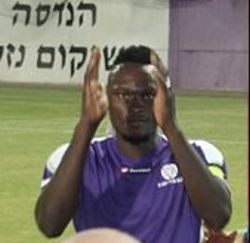
- Michael Tukura playing for Hakoah Amidar Ramat Gan, 2013

Personal information
- Full name: Michael Tukura
- Date of birth: 19 October 1988 (age 38)
- Place of birth: Abuja, Nigeria
- Height: 1.92 m (6 ft 4 in)
- Position: Midfielder

Youth career
- dynamite f.c

Senior career*
Years	Team	Apps	(Gls)
2007–2008	Wikki Tourists		
2008–2009	→ Hakoah Ramat Gan (loan)	24	(2)
2009–2010	Maccabi Nazareth	23	(1)
2010–2012	FK Ventspils	39	(6)
2011–2012	→ Rubin Kazan (loan)	0	(0)
2012–2013	Vaslui	5	(0)
2013–2014	Hakoah Amidar Ramat Gan	34	(8)
2014–2015	Hapoel Petah Tikva	29	(1)
2015–2016	Hapoel Ramat Gan	37	(4)
- * Club domestic league appearances and goals as of 1 July 2015

Michael Tukura (born 19 October 1988 in Abuja) is a Nigerian footballer, who currently plays for the Israeli Premier League club Hapoel Petah Tikva.

== Career ==
Tukura began his career with dynamite f.c in Nigeria. In 2007, he signed with Wikki Tourists F.C., and in summer 2008 he joined the Israeli club Hakoah Amidar Ramat Gan on a ten months loan deal. He played his first game in the Israeli Premier League on 13 September 2008 against Bnei Yehuda. At the end of the season Hakoah Amidar Ramat Gan finished last in the league table and were relegated back to Liga Leumit after the play-off matches against Maccabi Ahi Nazareth. In fact, in 2009 he moved to the new promoted Maccabi Ahi Nazareth, where he spent a year, playing 23 matches and scoring 1 goal. In April 2010 Tukura joined FK Ventspils, playing in the Latvian Virsliga. He made his debut on 1, 2010 in a league match against SK Blāzma. He scored his first goal in a league match against FK Jūrmala-VV on 2 June 2010. All in all he played 14 matches that season, scoring 1 goal. On July 11, 2014, Tukura signed with Hapoel Petah Tikva, which was promoted from the Liga Leumit to the Israeli Premier League.

== Position ==
Tukura plays as a central midfielder in attacking midfield or defensive midfield and also as center back.

== Honours ==
- Triobet Baltic League (1): 2010
- Latvian Cup (1): 2011
