= Sebastian Huțan =

Romanian footballer

Sebastian Huţan
Personal information
- Full name: Sebastian Dumitru Huţan
- Date of birth: 26 October 1983 (age 43)
- Place of birth: Arad, Romania
- Height: 1.86 m (6 ft 1 in)
- Position: Goalkeeper

Team information
- Current team: Viitorul Arad (GK Coach)

Youth career
- UTA Arad

Senior career*
Years	Team	Apps	(Gls)
1999–2002	UTA Arad	57	(0)
2002–2006	Sheriff Tiraspol	46	(0)
2005–2006	→ Vaslui (loan)	15	(0)
2006	Dynamo Moscow	0	(0)
2006–2008	UTA Arad	27	(0)
2008–2009	Liberty Salonta	14	(0)
2009–2010	Universitatea Cluj	27	(0)
2010–2011	CSMS Iaşi	5	(0)
Total		191	(0)

International career^{‡}
2001–2002	Romania U-19	6	(0)
2003–2004	Romania U-21	12	(0)

Managerial career
- 2012–2013: Frontiera Curtici (GK Coach)
- 2013–2016: UTA Arad (GK Coach)
- 2018–2020: Gloria LT Cermei (GK Coach)
- 2023: Unirea Sântana (GK Coach)
- 2024: UTA Arad (GK Coach)
- 2024–: Viitorul Arad (GK Coach)
- * Club domestic league appearances and goals as of 22:42, 6 January 2025 (UTC) ‡ National team caps and goals as of 22:42, 6 January 2025 (UTC)

Sebastian Dumitru Huţan (born 26 October 1983) is a Romanian retired footballer who played as a goalkeeper for teams such as UTA Arad, Sheriff Tiraspol, Liberty Salonta or Universitatea Cluj, among others.

== Honours ==
Sheriff Tiraspol

- Divizia Naţională: 2002–03, 2003–04, 2004–05, 2005–06, 2006–07
- Moldovan Cup: 2006
- Moldovan Super Cup: 2003
- CIS Cup: 2003
