= Davide Dias =

Portuguese footballer

Davide
Personal information
- Full name: Davide Alexandre Pinto Dias
- Date of birth: 12 April 1983 (age 43)
- Place of birth: Lisbon, Portugal
- Height: 1.79 m (5 ft 10 in)
- Position: Winger

Youth career
- 1992–1994: Tenente Valdez
- 1994–2002: Estrela Amadora

Senior career*
Years	Team	Apps	(Gls)
2002–2005	Estrela Amadora	53	(3)
2005–2007	Braga	27	(0)
2007–2011	Naval	74	(0)
2011	Apollon Limassol	2	(0)
2012	Brașov	16	(2)
2012	Vaslui	5	(0)
2013–2014	Brașov	35	(0)
2014–2016	Santa Clara	30	(1)
2016	Ideal	15	(1)
2016–2017	Anadia	28	(3)
Total		285	(10)

International career
2002	Portugal U19	6	(0)
2002–2003	Portugal U20	12	(1)
2004–2005	Portugal U21	5	(0)
2006	Portugal B	2	(0)
- * Club domestic league appearances and goals

Davide Alexandre Pinto Dias (born 12 April 1983 in Lisbon), known simply as Davide, is a Portuguese former professional footballer who played as a right winger.
