= Sreten Stanić =

Serbian footballer

Personal information
- Date of birth: February 15, 1984 (age 42)
- Place of birth: Loznica, SFR Yugoslavia
- Height: 1.79 m (5 ft 10 1/2 in)
- Position: Left winger

Youth career
- 1999–2001: Rad

Senior career*
| Years | Team | Apps | (Gls) |
| 2001–2005 | Rad | 92 | (7) |
| 2006 | Politehnica Timișoara | 11 | (1) |
| 2006 | Dinamo București | 1 | (0) |
| 2007–2008 | Rad | 31 | (0) |
| 2008–2009 | Banat Zrenjanin | 15 | (0) |
| 2009 | Čukarički | 11 | (0) |
| 2010 | Borac Banja Luka | 6 | (0) |
| 2011 | Bežanija | 6 | (0) |
| Total | | 173 | (8) |

International career
| 2003 | Serbia and Montenegro U19 | | |
- * Club domestic league appearances and goals

Sreten Stanić (Serbian Cyrillic: Сретен Станић; born February 15, 1984) is a Serbian retired footballer.

== Career ==
Bought from Rad in the winter of 2006 by Politehnica Timișoara, he moved to Dinamo București during the summer market of the same year. He usually played on the left wing, as an attacking midfielder.

== International career ==
Stanić was part of all Serbian National sides up to the U21 level, which he did not manage to reach.
