= Paíto =

Mozambican footballer

Personal information
- Full name: Martinho Martins Mukana
- Date of birth: 5 July 1982 (age 44)
- Place of birth: Maputo, Mozambique
- Height: 1.72 m (5 ft 8 in)
- Position: Left-back

Youth career
- Maxaquene

Senior career*
Years	Team	Apps	(Gls)
2000–2003	Sporting CP B	52	(2)
2003–2006	Sporting CP	24	(0)
2006	→ Vitória Guimarães (loan)	16	(1)
2006–2007	Mallorca	0	(0)
2006–2007	→ Braga (loan)	4	(0)
2007–2010	Sion	77	(3)
2010–2012	Neuchâtel Xamax	41	(1)
2012	Vaslui	13	(1)
2013–2014	Skoda Xanthi	32	(0)
Total		259	(8)

International career
2002–2012	Mozambique	39	(0)
- * Club domestic league appearances and goals

Martinho Martins Mukana (born 5 July 1982), known as Paíto, is a Mozambican former professional footballer who played as a left-back.

== Club career ==
Born in Maputo, Paíto began his senior career at Sporting CP. He became a regular in the 2004–05 season after being granted Portuguese citizenship and, on 26 January 2005, scored his only goal for the Lions in a 3–3 draw against S.L. Benfica in the sixth round of the Taça de Portugal (penalty shootout loss), in a solo effort.

After the arrival in January 2006, on loan from Valencia CF, of Portuguese international Marco Caneira, Paíto was deemed surplus to requirements and left, also loaned, to Vitória de Guimarães. He was an undisputed starter during his short tenure, as the Minho team eventually dropped down a level.

Purchased by La Liga club RCD Mallorca, Paíto immediately returned to Portugal, being loaned to S.C. Braga for the duration of the campaign. Released by the Balearic Islands side without making any official appearances, he joined FC Sion on a three-year contract.

After three solid seasons in the Swiss Super League, Paíto stayed in Switzerland, signing with fellow league team Neuchâtel Xamax FCS. After the latter went bankrupt, in January 2012 he joined FC Vaslui from Romania, reuniting with former Sporting coach Augusto Inácio.

Paíto spent the first half of the following campaign without a club, signing in early January 2013 with Skoda Xanthi FC. He made his Super League Greece debut on the 27th, playing the full 90 minutes in a 1–0 away win over PAOK FC.

== International career ==
Paíto started representing Mozambique at age 20. He was recalled in April for the 2002 COSAFA Cup, nearly two years after his last international. Additionally, he took part in the 2003 COSAFA Cup, the 2006 FIFA World Cup 2006 World Cup qualification, the 2004 COSAFA Cup, 2008 Africa Cup of Nations qualification and the 2010 World Cup qualifiers.

== Personal life ==
Paíto's son, Edson, was also a professional footballer.

== Honours ==
Sporting CP

- Taça de Portugal: 2001–02

Sion

- Swiss Cup: 2008–09
