= Jaime Bragança =

Portuguese footballer (born 1983)

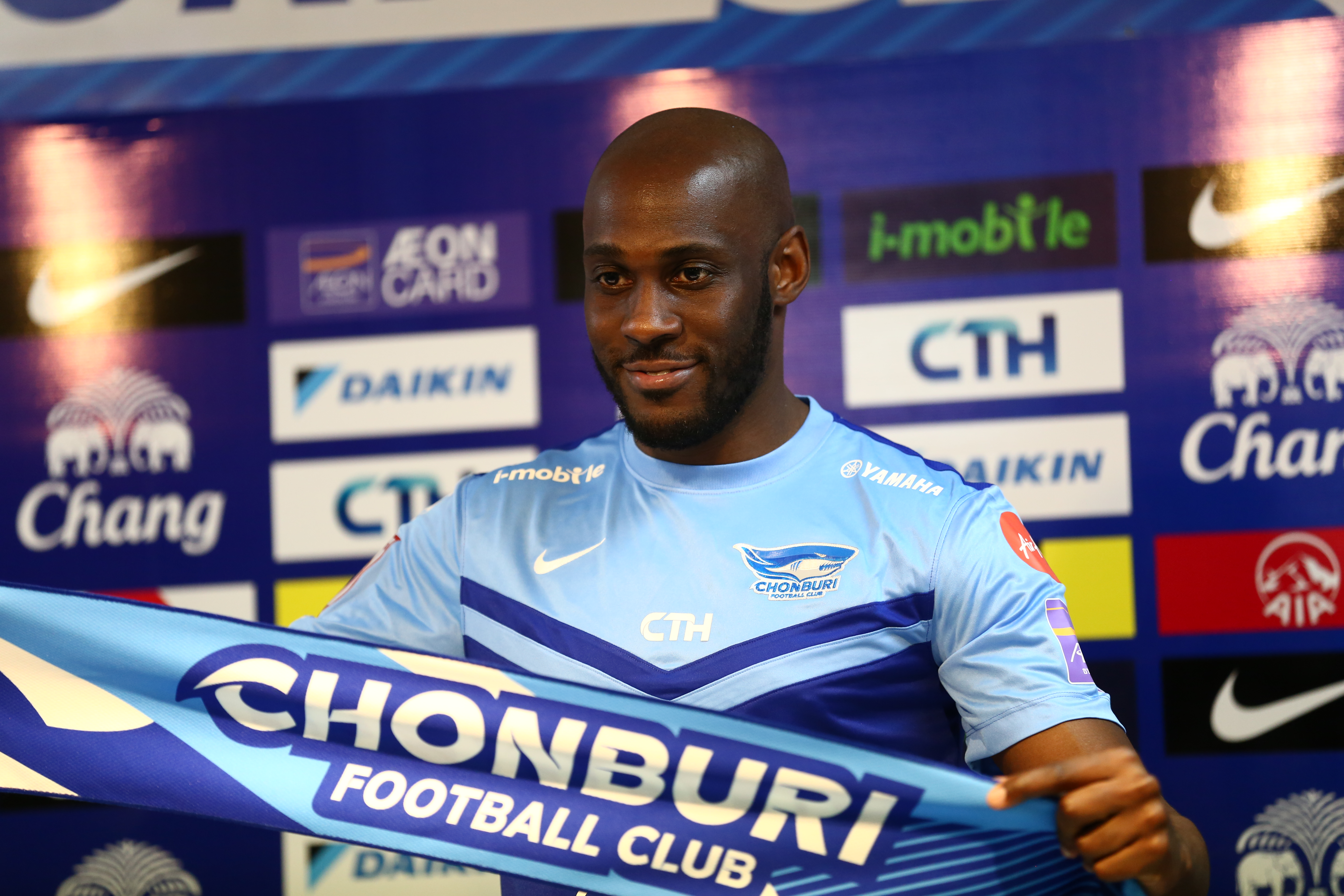
- Bragança signing for Chonburi Fc

Personal information
- Full name: Jaime Celestino Dias Bragança
- Date of birth: 9 June 1983 (age 43)
- Place of birth: Lisbon, Portugal
- Height: 1.84 m (6 ft 0 in)
- Position: Winger

Youth career
- 1992–1999: Sporting CP
- 1999–2000: Odivelas
- 2000–2001: Marítimo

Senior career*
| Years | Team | Apps | (Gls) |
| 2001–2004 | Marítimo B | 46 | (5) |
| 2002–2004 | Marítimo | 5 | (0) |
| 2004–2005 | Santa Clara | 10 | (0) |
| 2005–2006 | Olhanense | 14 | (0) |
| 2006–2007 | Gondomar | 15 | (1) |
| 2007–2008 | Al-Riffa | 17 | (6) |
| 2008–2009 | FC Ingolstadt | 15 | (0) |
| 2009–2010 | Al Sahel | 10 | (9) |
| 2011 | Chernomorets Burgas | 10 | (3) |
| 2011–2012 | Jakarta FC 1928 | 16 | (5) |
| 2012 | Vaslui | 2 | (0) |
| 2012 | Gloria Bistrița | 10 | (1) |
| 2013 | Al-Riffa | 16 | (7) |
| 2013 | Corona Braşov | 8 | (0) |
| 2014 | Chonburi | 7 | (2) |
| 2014 | Vila Nova | 3 | (0) |
| 2015 | PDRM FA | 11 | (2) |
| Total | | 215 | (41) |
- * Club domestic league appearances and goals

Jaime Celestino Dias Bragança (born 9 June 1983 in Lisbon) is a Portuguese retired professional footballer who played as a winger.

In June 2016, Jaime Bragança announced his retirement and became a football agent.
