= Arões S.C. =

Portuguese association football club

Home colours	Away colours

The Arões Sport Club is the football team of São Romão de Arões, Portugal.

== Stadium ==
The official stadium of Arões is the Parque Desportivo Centro Formação Juventude de Arões and has a capacity for 3 000 people.

Página do Arões na FPF
