= Richard Annang =

Ghanaian footballer (born 1991)

Personal information
- Full name: Richard Annang
- Date of birth: 10 April 1991 (age 35)
- Place of birth: Tema, Ghana
- Height: 1.81 m (5 ft 11 in)
- Position: Left wing-back

Youth career
- 2007–2010: Tema Youth

Senior career*
| Years | Team | Apps | (Gls) |
| 2009–2010 | Tema Youth | | |
| 2010–2013 | Vaslui | 6 | (0) |
| 2013–2015 | Berekum Chelsea | | |

International career
- Ghana U17
| | Ghana U20 | 2 | (0) |
- * Club domestic league appearances and goals as of 3 May 2019

Richard Annang (born April 10, 1991, in Ghana) is a Ghanaian former footballer who played on the left wing, both as defender and as midfielder.

== Career ==
In 2009 and 2010, he joined TSG 1899 Hoffenheim and respectively AS Saint-Étienne on trial. Clubs like Arsenal F.C. and AFC Ajax have also expressed interest in Annang.

=== FC Vaslui ===
In the summer of 2010 Annang signed a 5-year deal with Liga I side FC Vaslui. After 6 games he was seen as a player with much potential and talent but he suffered a very bad injury (cruciate ligament rupture) that kept him away from the field for almost a year. After more than 2 seasons with Vaslui he left the club.
