= 2008–09 FC Vaslui season =

FC Vaslui
2008–09 season
- Owner: Adrian Porumboiu
- President: Ciprian Damian
- Manager: Viorel Hizo (Resigned on 1 November 2008); Viorel Moldovan (Resigned from 1 November 2008 to 26 May 2009); Cristian Dulca (from 26 May 2009)
- Stadium: Municipal
- Liga I: 5th
- Cupa României: Semifinals, eliminated
- UEFA Cup: First Round, eliminated
- UEFA Intertoto Cup: Third round, winner
- Top goalscorer: League: Mike Temwanjera (9); All: Mike Temwanjera (11); Lucian Burdujan (11)
- Highest home attendance: 8,000 vs FC Steaua București (30 July 2008); 8,000 vs FC Timișoara (18 April 2009)
- Lowest home attendance: 2,000 vs Gaz Metan Mediaş (31 October 2008)

The 2008–09 season is FC Vaslui's 7th season of its existence, and its 4th in a row, in Liga I. Because it finished 7th, FC Vaslui played on UEFA Intertoto Cup in the third round. FC Vaslui passed by Neftchi Baku, and it qualified for the 3rd preliminary round of UEFA Cup. In the play-off, it was eliminated by Slavia Prague, because of the away goal rule, being the only Romanian team, who was eliminated, without losing in UEFA Cup that season. In the championship, they started perfectly, after a 1–0 win against FC Steaua București and a 3–1 win against arch rivals Poli Iaşi. But because of the injuries, the team results began to be poor. After a 1–1 draw with Gaz Metan Mediaş, Viorel Hizo was dismissed, and Viorel Moldovan was named the new coach. The team entered in the winter break, on the 9th place. In the winter break, Adrian Porumboiu spent over 3 million €, for new signings, being the only Romanian team, who were not affected by the Global Economical Crisis. With Moldovan, the team reached the semi-finals of Romanian Cup, but after a 1–4 loss against Gloria Buzău, Moldovan was also sacked, and as a manager, was named the assistant Dulca. With Dulca as a coach, FC Vaslui resurrected, and saved its season, in the last 2 games, after a 1–0 win against FC Rapid București, and also a 1–0 win against Universitatea Craiova in front of 25.000 fans on Ion Oblemencu. The team finished 5th, and qualified in the 3rd round of UEFA Europa League.

== First-team squad ==
| No. | Name | Age | Nat. | Since | T. Apps. | L. Apps. | C. Apps. | I. Apps. | T. Goals | L. Goals | C. Goals | I. Goals | Transfer fee | Notes |
Goalkeepers
| 1 | Dušan Kuciak | 23 | (Slovakia) | 2008 | 44 | 34 | 4 | 6 | 0 | 0 | 0 | 0 | €0.8M | |
| 12 | Alessio Chiaverini | 24 | (Italy) | 2009 | 0 | 0 | 0 | 0 | 0 | 0 | 0 | 0 | Free | |
| 22 | Claudiu Puia | 21 | (Romania) | 2006 | 1 | 0 | 1 | 0 | 0 | 0 | 0 | 0 | Free | |
Defenders
| 2 | Paul Papp | 18 | (Romania) | 2009 (W) | 1 | 1 | 0 | 0 | 0 | 0 | 0 | 0 | €0.05M | |
| 3 | Dorian Andronic | 18 | (Romania) | 2007 (W) | 28 | 26 | 1 | 1 | 1 | 1 | 0 | 0 | Undisclosed | |
| 14 | Serge Akakpo | 20 | (Togo) | 2009 (W) | 5 | 4 | 1 | 0 | 0 | 0 | 0 | 0 | €0.5M | |
| 15 | Bogdan Buhuş | 28 | (Romania) | 2005 | 122 | 109 | 7 | 6 | 0 | 0 | 0 | 0 | Free | |
| 16 | Stéphane Zubar | 21 | (France) | 2009 (W) | 12 | 10 | 2 | 0 | 0 | 0 | 0 | 0 | €0.4M | |
| 17 | Silviu Bălace | 29 | (Romania) | 2007 | 46 | 42 | 2 | 2 | 1 | 1 | 0 | 0 | €0.35M | |
| 26 | Pavol Farkaš | 23 | (Slovakia) | 2009 (W) | 18 | 16 | 2 | 0 | 2 | 2 | 0 | 0 | €0.2M | |
| 27 | Hugo Luz | 26 | (Portugal) | 2008 (W) | 41 | 36 | 2 | 4 | 1 | 1 | 0 | 0 | €0.05M | |
| 28 | Gabriel Cânu | 27 | (Romania) | 2008 | 28 | 21 | 3 | 4 | 3 | 2 | 0 | 1 | €0.36M | |
| 29 | Daniel Munteanu | 30 | (Romania) | 2008 | 17 | 11 | 1 | 5 | 0 | 0 | 0 | 0 | €0.25M | |
Midfielders
| 4 | Stanislav Genchev | 27 | (Bulgaria) | 2008 | 43 | 34 | 3 | 6 | 6 | 3 | 1 | 2 | Free | |
| 5 | Marius Ştefoi | 18 | (Romania) | 2009 (W) | 3 | 3 | 0 | 0 | 0 | 0 | 0 | 0 | €0.05M | |
| 8 | Denis Zmeu | 23 | (Moldova) | 2007 (W) | 58 | 50 | 5 | 3 | 2 | 2 | 0 | 0 | €0.2M | |
| 10 | Nemanja Milisavljević | 23 | (Serbia) | 2009 (W) | 18 | 16 | 2 | 0 | 1 | 1 | 0 | 0 | €0.5M | |
| 11 | Adrian Gheorghiu | 26 | (Romania) | 2006 | 81 | 73 | 4 | 4 | 10 | 9 | 1 | 0 | Undisclosed | |
| 20 | Marko Ljubinković | 26 | (Serbia) | 2006 | 93 | 86 | 1 | 6 | 24 | 24 | 0 | 0 | €0.05M | |
| 23 | Miloš Pavlović | 24 | (Serbia) | 2009 (W) | 18 | 16 | 2 | 0 | 1 | 1 | 0 | 0 | €0.25M | |
| 80 | Wesley | 27 | (Brazil) | 2009 (W) | 18 | 16 | 2 | 0 | 8 | 7 | 1 | 0 | €1.5M | |
Forwards
| 9 | Lucian Burdujan | 24 | (Romania) | 2008 | 36 | 28 | 3 | 5 | 11 | 6 | 2 | 3 | Swap | |
| 18 | Vasile Buhăescu | 20 | (Romania) | 2005 | 74 | 67 | 5 | 2 | 3 | 3 | 0 | 0 | Youth | |
| 19 | Mike Temwanjera | 26 | (Zimbabwe) | 2007 (W) | 83 | 74 | 3 | 6 | 19 | 17 | 1 | 1 | Undisclosed | |
| 21 | Nemanja Jovanović | 23 | (Serbia) | 2008 | 23 | 17 | 2 | 4 | 2 | 1 | 1 | 0 | €0.28M | |
| 30 | Hristijan Kirovski | 22 | (North Macedonia) | 2009 (W) | 12 | 10 | 2 | 0 | 2 | 2 | 0 | 0 | €0.35M | |

- T=Total
- L=Liga I
- C=Cupa României
- I=UEFA Europa League, Intertoto UEFA Cup

== Transfers ==
=== In ===
==== Summer ====
| # | Pos | Player | From | Fee | Date |
|---|---|---|---|---|---|
| 1 | GK | (Slovakia) Dušan Kuciak | MŠK Žilina | €0.8 million | June 2008 |
| 4 | MF | (Bulgaria) Stanislav Genchev | PFC Litex Lovech | €0.1 million | 13 June 2008 |
| 5 | DF | (Bulgaria) Rosen Kirilov | APOP Kinyras | free | October 2008 |
| 6 | DF | (Serbia) Neven Marković | FK Rad | €0.25 million | 20 June 2008 |
| 7 | FW | (Serbia) Nemanja Jovanović | U Cluj | €0.28 million | 26 June 2008 |
| 9 | FW | (Romania) Lucian Burdujan | FC Rapid București | swap deal | 4 July 2008 |
| 10 | MF | (Romania) Marian Aliuţă | FC Timișoara | €0.2 million | June 2008 |
| 28 | DF | (Romania) Gabriel Cânu | FC Timișoara | €0.35 million | June 2008 |
| 29 | DF | (Romania) Daniel Munteanu | Unirea Urziceni | €0.25 million | 5 June 2008 |

==== Winter ====
| # | Pos | Player | From | Fee | Date |
|---|---|---|---|---|---|
| 2 | DF | (Romania) Paul Papp | FC Botoşani | €0.05 million | 23 February 2009 |
| 5 | MF | (Romania) Marius Ştefoi | FC Botoşani | €0.05 million | 23 February 2009 |
| 10 | MF | (Serbia) Nemanja Milisavljević | FK Rabotnički | €0.5 million | 28 December 2008 |
| 14 | DF | (Togo) Serge Akakpo | AJ Auxerre | €0.5 million | 28 December 2008 |
| 16 | DF | (France) Stéphane Zubar | SM Caen | €0.4 million | 9 February 2009 |
| 23 | MF | (Serbia) Miloš Pavlović | Académica de Coimbra | €0.5 million | 22 January 2009 |
| 26 | DF | (Slovakia) Pavol Farkas | FC Artmedia Petržalka | €0.35 million | 9 February 2009 |
| 30 | FW | (North Macedonia) Hristijan Kirovski | FK Rabotnički | €0.35 million | 13 March 2009 |
| 80 | FW | (Brazil) Wesley Lopes | Leixões S.C. | €1 million | 21 January 2009 |

=== Out ===
==== Summer ====
| # | Pos | Player | To | Fee | Date |
|---|---|---|---|---|---|
| 5 | DF | (Romania) Ştefan Mardare | FC Rapid București | €0.5 million | 4 July 2008 |
| 6 | DF | (Romania) Laurențiu Ivan | CS Otopeni | €0.15 million | Summer |
| 10 | MF | (Romania) Sorin Frunză | Unirea Urziceni | €0.3 million | 4 June 2008 |
| 14 | MF | (Romania) Ionuţ Pavel | Cetatea Suceava | free | 5 July 2008 |
| 16 | MF | (Romania) Daniel Sabou | Gloria Bistriţa | €0.15 million | June 2008 |
| 24 | DF | (Romania) Ştefan Apostol | Aerostar Bacău | free | June 2008 |
| 26 | ST | (Serbia) Milorad Bukvić | Cetatea Suceava | free | 8 July 2008 |
| TBD | DF | (Romania) Bogdan Cotolan | Cetatea Suceava | €0.1 million | 5 July 2008 |

==== Winter ====
| # | Pos | Player | To | Fee | Date |
|---|---|---|---|---|---|
| 5 | DF | (Bulgaria) Rosen Kirilov | Unknown | Finished contract | 31 December 2008 |
| 10 | MF | (Romania) Marian Aliuţă | Neftchi Baku PFC | Undisclosed | 5 February 2009 |
| 21 | MF | (Senegal) Ousmane N'Doye | FC Dinamo București | €0.45 million | 14 January 2009 |
| 23 | FW | (Romania) Marius Matei | FC Botoşani | Released | Winter |

=== Loaned out ===
| # | Pos | Player | To | Start | End |
|---|---|---|---|---|---|
| 1 | GK | (Romania) Mihai Luca | Cetatea Suceava | 1 July 2008 | End of season |
| 2 | MF | (Romania) Marius Doboş | FCM Bacău | Summer | End of season |
| 16 | DF | (Romania) Bogdan Panait | CS Otopeni | Winter | End of season |
| 25 | FW | (Romania) Răzvan Neagu | FCM Bacău | Winter | End of season |
| 30 | MF | (Serbia) Petar Jovanović | FC Politehnica Iaşi | 20 February 2009 | End of season |
| 81 | GK | (Romania) Cristian Hăisan | FCM Bacău | 22 February 2009 | End of season |

=== Overall ===
==== Spending ====
Summer: ▼€2,230,000

Winter: ▼€3,700,000

Total: ▼€5,930,000

==== Income ====
Summer: ▲€1,200,000

Winter: ▲€0,450,000

Total: ▲€1,650,000

==== Outcome ====
Summer: ▼€1,030,000

Winter: ▼€3,250,000

Total: ▼€4,280,000

== Statistics ==
=== Appearances and goals ===
Last updated on 10 June 2009.

| No. | Pos | Nat | Player | Total | | Liga I | | UEFA Cup | | Cupa României | | UEFA Intertoto Cup | |
| No. | Pos | Nat | Player | Apps | Goals | Apps | Goals | Apps | Goals | Apps | Goals | Apps | Goals |
|---|---|---|---|---|---|---|---|---|---|---|---|---|---|
| 1 | GK | (Slovakia) SVK | Dušan Kuciak | 44 | -44 | 34 | -37 | 4 | -2 | 4 | -3 | 2 | -2 |
| 2 | DF | (Romania) ROU | Paul Papp | 1 | 0 | 0+1 | 0 | 0 | 0 | 0 | 0 | 0 | 0 |
| 3 | DF | (Romania) ROU | Dorian Andronic | 6 | 0 | 4+1 | 0 | 0+1 | 0 | 0 | 0 | 0 | 0 |
| 4 | MF | (Bulgaria) BUL | Stanislav Genchev | 43 | 6 | 32+2 | 3 | 4 | 1 | 3 | 1 | 2 | 1 |
| 5 | MF | (Romania) ROU | Marius Ştefoi | 3 | 0 | 0+3 | 0 | 0 | 0 | 0 | 0 | 0 | 0 |
| 6 | DF | (Serbia) SRB | Neven Marković | 14 | 0 | 7+3 | 0 | 1 | 0 | 2 | 0 | 0+1 | 0 |
| 8 | MF | (Moldova) MDA | Denis Zmeu | 24 | 1 | 6+11 | 1 | 0+3 | 0 | 2+2 | 0 | 0 | 0 |
| 9 | FW | (Romania) ROU | Lucian Burdujan | 36 | 11 | 23+5 | 6 | 3 | 2 | 3 | 2 | 2 | 1 |
| 10 | MF | (Serbia) SRB | Nemanja Milisavljević | 18 | 1 | 13+3 | 1 | 0 | 0 | 2 | 0 | 0 | 0 |
| 11 | MF | (Romania) ROU | Adrian Gheorghiu | 24 | 1 | 10+7 | 0 | 1+1 | 0 | 2+1 | 1 | 0+2 | 0 |
| 14 | DF | (Togo) TOG | Serge Akakpo | 5 | 0 | 3+1 | 0 | 0 | 0 | 1 | 0 | 0 | 0 |
| 15 | DF | (Romania) ROU | Bogdan Buhuş | 37 | 0 | 27 | 0 | 4 | 0 | 4 | 0 | 2 | 0 |
| 16 | MF | (France) FRA | Stéphane Zubar | 9 | 0 | 7+2 | 0 | 0 | 0 | 0 | 0 | 0 | 0 |
| 17 | DF | (Romania) ROU | Silviu Bălace | 18 | 0 | 8+6 | 0 | 0+1 | 0 | 1+1 | 0 | 1 | 0 |
| 18 | MF | (Romania) ROU | Vasile Buhăescu | 15 | 0 | 1+10 | 0 | 0+2 | 0 | 0+2 | 0 | 0 | 0 |
| 19 | FW | (Zimbabwe) ZIM | Mike Temwanjera | 42 | 11 | 28+5 | 9 | 4 | 0 | 2+1 | 1 | 2 | 1 |
| 20 | MF | (Serbia) SRB | Marko Ljubinković | 35 | 6 | 26+2 | 6 | 4 | 0 | 1 | 0 | 2 | 0 |
| 21 | FW | (Serbia) SRB | Nemanja Jovanović | 24 | 2 | 5+12 | 1 | 0+3 | 0 | 1+2 | 1 | 0+1 | 0 |
| 23 | MF | (Serbia) SRB | Miloš Pavlović | 18 | 1 | 15+1 | 1 | 0 | 0 | 2 | 0 | 0 | 0 |
| 26 | DF | (Slovakia) SVK | Pavol Farkas | 18 | 2 | 16 | 2 | 0 | 0 | 2 | 0 | 0 | 0 |
| 27 | DF | (Portugal) POR | Hugo Luz | 33 | 1 | 26 | 1 | 3 | 0 | 3 | 0 | 1 | 0 |
| 28 | DF | (Romania) ROU | Gabriel Cânu | 28 | 3 | 20+1 | 2 | 2 | 1 | 3 | 0 | 2 | 0 |
| 29 | DF | (Romania) ROU | Daniel Munteanu | 17 | 0 | 8+3 | 0 | 3 | 0 | 0+1 | 0 | 2 | 0 |
| 30 | FW | (North Macedonia) MKD | Hristijan Kirovski | 12 | 2 | 3+7 | 2 | 0 | 0 | 1+1 | 0 | 0 | 0 |
| 80 | FW | (Brazil) BRA | Wesley Lopes | 18 | 8 | 15+1 | 7 | 0 | 0 | 2 | 1 | 0 | 0 |
Players sold or loaned out during the season
| 5 | DF | (Bulgaria) BUL | Rosen Kirilov | 1 | 0 | 1 | 0 | 0 | 0 | 0 | 0 | 0 | 0 |
| 10 | MF | (Romania) ROU | Marian Aliuţă | 17 | 0 | 11 | 0 | 3+1 | 0 | 0 | 0 | 2 | 0 |
| 16 | DF | (Romania) ROU | Bogdan Panait | 9 | 0 | 5 | 0 | 2 | 0 | 0+1 | 0 | 0+1 | 0 |
| 21 | MF | (Senegal) SEN | Ousmane N'Doye | 22 | 2 | 14+1 | 0 | 4 | 2 | 1 | 0 | 2 | 0 |
| 23 | FW | (Romania) ROU | Marius Matei | 2 | 0 | 0+2 | 0 | 0 | 0 | 0 | 0 | 0 | 0 |
| 25 | FW | (Romania) ROU | Răzvan Neagu | 4 | 0 | 2+1 | 0 | 0 | 0 | 1 | 0 | 0 | 0 |
| 30 | MF | (Serbia) SRB | Petar Jovanović | 14 | 0 | 4+6 | 0 | 2 | 0 | 1 | 0 | 0+1 | 0 |
| 81 | GK | (Romania) ROU | Cristian Hăisan | 0 | 0 | 0 | 0 | 0 | 0 | 0 | 0 | 0 | 0 |

=== Top scorers ===
| Position | Nation | Number | Name | Liga I | UEFA Cup | Intertoto UEFA Cup | Romanian Cup | Total |
|---|---|---|---|---|---|---|---|---|
| 1 | (Zimbabwe) | 19 | Mike Temwanjera | 9 | 0 | 1 | 1 | 11 |
| = | (Romania) | 9 | Lucian Burdujan | 6 | 2 | 1 | 2 | 11 |
| 3 | (Brazil) | 80 | Wesley | 7 | 0 | 0 | 1 | 8 |
| 4 | (Serbia) | 20 | Marko Ljubinković | 6 | 0 | 0 | 0 | 6 |
| = | (Bulgaria) | 4 | Stanislav Genchev | 3 | 1 | 1 | 1 | 6 |
| 6 | (Romania) | 28 | Gabriel Cânu | 2 | 1 | 0 | 0 | 3 |
| 7 | (Slovakia) | 26 | Pavol Farkas | 2 | 0 | 0 | 0 | 2 |
| = | (North Macedonia) | 30 | Hristijan Kirovski | 2 | 0 | 0 | 0 | 2 |
| = | (Senegal) | 21 | Ousmane N'Doye | 0 | 2 | 0 | 0 | 2 |
| = | (Serbia) | 7/21 | Nemanja Jovanović | 1 | 0 | 0 | 1 | 2 |
| 11 | (Portugal) | 27 | Hugo Luz | 1 | 0 | 0 | 0 | 1 |
| = | (Serbia) | 10 | Nemanja Milisavljević | 1 | 0 | 0 | 0 | 1 |
| = | (Serbia) | 23 | Miloš Pavlović | 1 | 0 | 0 | 0 | 1 |
| = | (Moldova) | 8 | Denis Zmeu | 1 | 0 | 0 | 0 | 1 |
| = | (Romania) | 11 | Adrian Gheorghiu | 0 | 0 | 0 | 1 | 1 |
| / | / | / | Own Goals | 2 | 0 | 0 | 0 | 2 |
| | | | TOTALS | 44 | 6 | 3 | 7 | 60 |

=== Top assists ===
| Position | Nation | Number | Name | Liga I | UEFA Cup | Intertoto UEFA Cup | Romanian Cup | Total |
|---|---|---|---|---|---|---|---|---|
| 1 | (Romania) | 11 | Adrian Gheorghiu | 5 | 0 | 0 | 0 | 5 |
| 2 | (Romania) | 10 | Marian Aliuţă | 4 | 1 | 0 | 0 | 5 |
| 3 | (Serbia) | 10 | Nemanja Milisavljević | 3 | 0 | 0 | 1 | 4 |
| 4 | (Zimbabwe) | 19 | Mike Temwanjera | 3 | 0 | 0 | 0 | 3 |
| = | (Portugal) | 27 | Hugo Luz | 2 | 1 | 0 | 0 | 3 |
| = | (Romania) | 9 | Lucian Burdujan | 2 | 0 | 0 | 1 | 3 |
| 7 | (Romania) | 18 | Vasile Buhăescu | 2 | 0 | 0 | 0 | 2 |
| = | (Romania) | 15 | Bogdan Buhuş | 2 | 0 | 0 | 0 | 2 |
| = | (Bulgaria) | 4 | Stanislav Genchev | 1 | 1 | 0 | 0 | 2 |
| 10 | (Slovakia) | 26 | Pavol Farkas | 1 | 0 | 0 | 0 | 1 |
| = | (Serbia) | 30 | Petar Jovanović | 1 | 0 | 0 | 0 | 1 |
| = | (Serbia) | 20 | Marko Ljubinković | 1 | 0 | 0 | 0 | 1 |
| = | (Serbia) | 23 | Miloš Pavlović | 1 | 0 | 0 | 0 | 1 |
| = | (Brazil) | 80 | Wesley | 1 | 0 | 0 | 0 | 1 |
| = | (France) | 16 | Stéphane Zubar | 1 | 0 | 0 | 0 | 1 |
| = | (Bulgaria) | 21 | Ousmane N'Doye | 0 | 0 | 1 | 0 | 1 |
| = | (Moldova) | 8 | Denis Zmeu | 0 | 0 | 0 | 1 | 1 |
| | | | TOTALS | 26 | 3 | 1 | 3 | 33 |

=== Disciplinary record ===
| Position | Nation | Number | Name | Liga I | | UEFA Cup | | Intertoto UEFA Cup | | Romanian Cup | | Total | |
| Position | Nation | Number | Name | Booked | Sent off (straight red) | Booked | Sent off (straight red) | Booked | Sent off (straight red) | Booked | Sent off (straight red) | Booked | Sent off (straight red) |
|---|---|---|---|---|---|---|---|---|---|---|---|---|---|
| GK | (Slovakia) | 1 | Dušan Kuciak | 2 | 0 | 0 | 0 | 0 | 0 | 0 | 0 | 2 | 0 |
| DF | (Romania) | 3 | Dorian Andronic | 3 | 0 | 0 | 0 | 0 | 0 | 0 | 0 | 3 | 0 |
| MF | (Bulgaria) | 4 | Stanislav Genchev | 4 | 0 | 1 | 0 | 0 | 0 | 0 | 0 | 5 | 0 |
| DF | (Serbia) | 6 | Neven Marković | 2 | 0 | 1 | 0 | 0 | 0 | 1 | 0 | 4 | 0 |
| MF | (Moldova) | 8 | Denis Zmeu | 2 | 0 | 0 | 0 | 0 | 0 | 1 | 0 | 3 | 0 |
| FW | (Romania) | 9 | Lucian Burdujan | 5 | 0 | 1 | 0 | 0 | 0 | 0 | 0 | 6 | 0 |
| MF | (Serbia) | 10 | Nemanja Milisavljević | 1 | 0 | 0 | 0 | 0 | 0 | 0 | 0 | 1 | 0 |
| MF | (Romania) | 10 | Marian Aliuţă | 1 | 0 | 0 | 0 | 1 | 0 | 0 | 0 | 2 | 0 |
| MF | (Romania) | 11 | Adrian Gheorghiu | 1 | 0 | 0 | 0 | 1 | 0 | 0 | 0 | 2 | 0 |
| DF | (France) | 14 | Serge Akakpo | 1 | 0 | 0 | 0 | 0 | 0 | 0 | 0 | 1 | 0 |
| DF | (Romania) | 15 | Bogdan Buhuş | 11 | 0 | 0 | 0 | 1 | 0 | 2 | 0 | 14 | 0 |
| DF | (Romania) | 16 | Bogdan Panait | 0 | 0 | 0 | 0 | 0 | 0 | 1 | 0 | 1 | 0 |
| MF | (Romania) | 17 | Silviu Bălace | 2 | 0 | 0 | 0 | 0 | 1 | 0 | 0 | 2 | 1 |
| FW | (Zimbabwe) | 19 | Mike Temwanjera | 6 | 0 | 1 | 0 | 0 | 0 | 0 | 0 | 7 | 0 |
| MF | (Serbia) | 20 | Marko Ljubinković | 4 | 0 | 0 | 0 | 0 | 0 | 0 | 0 | 4 | 0 |
| MF | (Senegal) | 21 | Ousmane N'Doye | 4 | 1 | 2 | 0 | 0 | 0 | 1 | 0 | 7 | 1 |
| MF | (Serbia) | 23 | Miloš Pavlović | 6 | 0 | 0 | 0 | 0 | 0 | 1 | 0 | 7 | 0 |
| FW | (Romania) | 25 | Răzvan Neagu | 1 | 0 | 0 | 0 | 0 | 0 | 1 | 0 | 2 | 0 |
| DF | (Slovakia) | 26 | Pavol Farkas | 5 | 0 | 0 | 0 | 0 | 0 | 1 | 0 | 6 | 0 |
| DF | (Portugal) | 27 | Hugo Luz | 3 | 0 | 0 | 0 | 0 | 0 | 0 | 0 | 3 | 0 |
| DF | (Romania) | 28 | Gabriel Cânu | 5 | 1 | 0 | 0 | 1 | 0 | 0 | 0 | 6 | 1 |
| DF | (Romania) | 29 | Daniel Munteanu | 1 | 0 | 0 | 0 | 0 | 0 | 0 | 0 | 1 | 0 |
| FW | (North Macedonia) | 30 | Hristijan Kirovski | 2 | 0 | 0 | 0 | 0 | 0 | 0 | 0 | 2 | 0 |
| MF | (Serbia) | 30 | Petar Jovanović | 1 | 1 | 1 | 0 | 0 | 0 | 0 | 0 | 2 | 1 |
| FW | (Brazil) | 80 | Wesley | 5 | 0 | 0 | 0 | 0 | 0 | 0 | 0 | 5 | 0 |
| | | | TOTALS | 78 | 3 | 7 | 0 | 4 | 1 | 9 | 0 | 98 | 4 |

=== Overall ===
| Games played | 44 (34 Liga I, 4 UEFA Cup, 2 UEFA Intertoto Cup, 4 Cupa României) |
| Games won | 23 (17 Liga I, 2 UEFA Cup, 1 UEFA Intertoto Cup, 3 Cupa României) |
| Games drawn | 8 (6 Liga I, 2 UEFA Cup) |
| Games lost | 13 (11 Liga I, 1 UEFA Intertoto Cup, 1 Cupa României) |
| Goals scored | 60 |
| Goals conceded | 44 |
| Goal difference | +16 |
| Yellow cards | 98 |
| Red cards | 4 |
| Worst discipline | (Romania) Bogdan Buhuş with 14 yellow cards |
| Best result | 3–0 (H) v Poli Iaşi – Cupa României – 5 October 2008; 3–0 (H) v Gloria Buzău – Liga I – 16 November 2008; 3–0 (H) v Gloria Bistriţa – Liga I – 14 March 2009 |
| Worst result | 0–3 (A) v CFR Cluj – Liga I – 4 March 2009; 1–4 (A) v Dinamo – Liga I – 11 March 2009; 1–4 (A) v Gloria Buzău – Liga I – 23 May 2009 |
| Most appearances | (Slovakia) Dušan Kuciak with 44 appearances |
| Top scorers | (Zimbabwe) Mike Temwanjera (11 goals) (Romania) Lucian Burdujan (11 goals) |
| Points | 57/102 (55.8%) |

Last updated: 10 June

==== Performances ====
Updated to games played on 10 June 2009.

| | All | | | | | | | | Home | | | | | | Away | | | | | |
| | Pld | Pts | W | D | L | GF | GA | GD | W | D | L | GF | GA | GD | W | D | L | GF | GA | GD |
|---|---|---|---|---|---|---|---|---|---|---|---|---|---|---|---|---|---|---|---|---|
| League | 34 | 57 | 17 | 6 | 11 | 44 | 37 | +7 | 11 | 2 | 4 | 26 | 15 | +11 | 6 | 4 | 7 | 18 | 22 | -4 |
| Overall | 34 | – | 23 | 8 | 13 | 60 | 44 | +16 | 14 | 3 | 4 | 35 | 17 | +18 | 9 | 5 | 9 | 25 | 27 | -2 |

==== Goal minutes ====
Updated to games played on 10 June 2009.

| 1'–15' | 16'–30' | 31'–HT | 46'–60' | 61'–75' | 76'–FT | Extra time |
|---|---|---|---|---|---|---|
| 9 | 12 | 15 | 7 | 5 | 12 | 0 |

== Liga I ==
=== League table ===
| Pos | Team | Pld | W | D | L | GF | GA | GD | Pts | Qualification or relegation |
|---|---|---|---|---|---|---|---|---|---|---|
| 3 | Dinamo București | 34 | 20 | 5 | 9 | 56 | 30 | +26 | 65 | Qualification to Europa League play-off round (Note: CFR Cluj as the 2008–09 Cupa României winners qualified for the play-off round of the 2009–10 UEFA Europa League.) |
| 4 | CFR Cluj | 34 | 16 | 11 | 7 | 44 | 26 | +18 | 59 | Qualification to Europa League play-off round |
| 5 | Vaslui | 34 | 17 | 6 | 11 | 44 | 37 | +7 | 57 | Qualification to Europa League third qualifying round |
| 6 | Steaua București | 34 | 14 | 14 | 6 | 44 | 27 | +17 | 56 (Note: STE 2–1 CRA; CRA 0–0 STE) | Qualification to Europa League second qualifying round |
| 7 | Universitatea Craiova | 34 | 15 | 11 | 8 | 44 | 25 | +19 | 56 | |

Source: LPF (in Romanian)
Rules for classification: 1) points; 2) head-to-head points; 3) head-to-head goal difference; 4) head-to-head goals scored; 5) goal difference; 6) number of goals scored.

=== Results summary ===
| Overall | | | | | | | | Home | | | | | | Away | | | | | |
| Pld | W | D | L | GF | GA | GD | Pts | W | D | L | GF | GA | GD | W | D | L | GF | GA | GD |
|---|---|---|---|---|---|---|---|---|---|---|---|---|---|---|---|---|---|---|---|
| 34 | 17 | 6 | 11 | 44 | 37 | +7 | 57 | 11 | 2 | 4 | 26 | 15 | +11 | 6 | 4 | 7 | 18 | 22 | −4 |

=== Results by round ===
| Round | 1 | 2 | 3 | 4 | 5 | 6 | 7 | 8 | 9 | 10 | 11 | 12 | 13 | 14 | 15 | 16 | 17 | 18 | 19 | 20 | 21 | 22 | 23 | 24 | 25 | 26 | 27 | 28 | 29 | 30 | 31 | 32 | 33 | 34 |
|---|---|---|---|---|---|---|---|---|---|---|---|---|---|---|---|---|---|---|---|---|---|---|---|---|---|---|---|---|---|---|---|---|---|---|
| Ground | H | A | H | A | H | A | H | A | H | A | H | A | H | A | H | A | H | A | H | A | H | A | H | A | H | A | H | A | H | A | H | A | H | A |
| Result | W | W | W | L | W | W | L | L | L | D | L | L | D | W | W | D | D | D | W | W | W | L | W | L | W | L | L | D | W | W | W | L | W | W |
| Position | 4 | 3 | 2 | 6 | 3 | 2 | 4 | 4 | 7 | 7 | 11 | 11 | 11 | 10 | 9 | 9 | 9 | 10 | 9 | 8 | 7 | 8 | 6 | 9 | 8 | 8 | 9 | 9 | 9 | 9 | 8 | 8 | 8 | 5 |

Updated to match(es) played on 10 June 2009 (UTC). Source: LPF
A = Away; H = Home; W = Win; D = Draw; L = Loss

== Matches ==
=== Liga I ===
| 30 July 2008 Matchday 1 | FC Vaslui | 1–0 | Steaua | Vaslui |
| 20:30 EET | Ljubinković 26' | | | Stadium: Municipal; Attendance: 8 000; Referee: Ovidiu Haţegan (Arad) |

| 3 August 2008 Matchday 2 | Poli Iaşi | 1–3 | FC Vaslui | Iaşi |
| 19:30 EET | Beršnjak 26' | | Temwanjera 33'; Cânu 39'; Ljubinković 53' | Stadium: Emil Alexandrescu; Attendance: - Referee: Sorin Corpodean (Alba-Iulia) |

| 8 August 2008 Matchday 3 | FC Vaslui | 1–0 | Gloria Bistriţa | Vaslui |
| 20:30 EET | Temwanjera 54' | | | Stadium: Municipal; Attendance: 6 000; Referee: Robert Dumitru (Braşov) |

| 17 August 2008 Matchday 4 | Farul | 1–0 | FC Vaslui | Constanţa |
| 19:45 EET | Gerlem 48' | | | Stadium: Farul; Attendance: 3 000; Referee: Augustus Constantin (Râmnicu-Vâlcea) |

| 24 August 2008 Matchday 5 | FC Vaslui | 2–1 | CFR Cluj | Vaslui |
| 19:00 EET | Burdujan 28', 63' | | Cadú 62' | Stadium: Municipal; Attendance: 5 000; Referee: Alexandru Deaconu (București) |

| 31 August 2008 Matchday 6 | Oţelul Galaţi | 0–1 | FC Vaslui | Galaţi |
| 17:45 EET | | | Temwanjera 67' | Stadium: Oţelul; Attendance: 8 000; Referee: Alexandru Tudor (București) |

| 12 September 2008 Matchday 7 | FC Vaslui | 1–2 | Dinamo | Vaslui |
| 19:00 EET | N. Jovanović 10' | | Dănciulescu 61'; F. Bratu 92' | Stadium: Municipal; Attendance: 6 000; Referee: Istvan Kovacs (Carei) |

| 21 September 2008 Matchday 8 | FC Timișoara | 3–1 | FC Vaslui | Timișoara |
| 19:00 EET | Bucur 41', 81'; Čišovský 74' | | Temwanjera 33' | Stadium: Dan Păltinişanu; Attendance: 6 000; Referee: Cristian Balaj (Baia-Mare) |

| 27 September 2008 Matchday 9 | FC Vaslui | 0–2 | Unirea Urziceni | Vaslui |
| 19:00 EET | | | Bilaşco 13'; Onofraş 89' | Stadium: Municipal; Attendance: 5 000; Referee: Ovidiu Haţegan (Arad) |

| 6 October 2008 Matchday 10 | FC Brașov | 0–0 | FC Vaslui | Braşov |
| 15:00 EET | | | | Stadium: Silviu Ploieşteanu; Attendance: 900; Referee: Marius Martiş (Focşani) |

| 19 October 2008 Matchday 11 | FC Vaslui | 0–1 | FC Argeş | Vaslui |
| 17:00 EET | | | Tameş 85' (pen.) | Stadium: Municipal; Attendance: 4 000; Referee: Sorin Corpodean (Alba-Iulia) |

| 24 October 2008 Matchday 12 | Pandurii | 1–0 | FC Vaslui | Târgu Jiu |
| 17:00 EET | Piţurcă 74' | | | Stadium: Tudor Vladimirescu; Attendance: 4 000; Referee: Marius Avram (București) |

| 31 October 2008 Matchday 13 | FC Vaslui | 1–1 | Gaz Metan Mediaş | Vaslui |
| 21:00 EET | Ljubinković 79' | | C. Prodan 76' | Stadium: Municipal; Attendance: 2 000; Referee: Victor Berbecaru (Râmnicu-Vâlcea) |

| 9 November 2008 Matchday 14 | CS Otopeni | 0–2 | FC Vaslui | Ploieşti |
| 19:00 EET | | | Ljubinković 52'; Burdujan 89' | Stadium: Stadionul Astra; Attendance: 300; Referee: Aurelian Bogaciu (București) |

| 16 November 2008 Matchday 15 | FC Vaslui | 3–0 | Gloria Buzău | Vaslui |
| 16:00 EET | C. Vlaicu 12'; Burdujan 40'; Temwanjera 86' | | | Stadium: Municipal; Attendance: 3 000; Referee: Robert Dumitru (Braşov) |

| 22 November 2008 Matchday 16 | Rapid | 2–2 | FC Vaslui | București |
| 21:00 EET | Maftei 2'; Spadacio 41' | | Genchev 55'; Burdujan 88' | Stadium: Valentin Stănescu; Attendance: 2 000; Referee: Augustus Constantin (Râmnicu-Vâlcea) |

| 28 November 2008 Matchday 17 | FC Vaslui | 1–1 | Universitatea Craiova | Vaslui |
| 20:00 EET | Temwanjera 92' | | Dina 6' | Stadium: Municipal; Attendance: 6 000; Referee: Lucian Dan (Aiud) |

| 27 February 2009 Matchday 18 | Steaua | 1–1 | FC Vaslui | București |
| 20:45 EET | Stancu 27' | | Wesley 8' | Stadium: Ghencea; Attendance: 17 000; Referee: Ovidiu Haţegan (Arad) |

| 6 March 2009 Matchday 19 | FC Vaslui | 2–0 | Poli Iaşi | Vaslui |
| 19:00 EET | Farkas 24', 35' | | | Stadium: Municipal; Attendance: 5 000; Referee: Georgian Ionescu (Buzău) |

| 14 March 2009 Matchday 20 | Gloria Bistriţa | 0–3 | FC Vaslui | Bistriţa |
| 15:00 EET | | | Wesley 44' (pen.); Kirovski 85', 89' | Stadium: Gloria; Attendance: 3 000; Referee: Alexandru Tudor (București) |

| 21 March 2009 Matchday 21 | FC Vaslui | 4–2 | Farul | Vaslui |
| 19:00 EET | H. Luz 10'; Wesley 31'; Ljubinković 40', 43' | | Pahor 39'; Chico 73' | Stadium: Municipal; Attendance: 7 500; Referee: Augustus Constantin (Râmnicu-Vâlcea) |

| 4 April 2009 Matchday 22 | CFR Cluj | 3–0 | FC Vaslui | Cluj |
| 13:00 EET | Alcântara 17'; Y. Koné 61'; Panin 93' | | | Stadium: Constantin Rădulescu; Attendance: 7 000; Referee: Cristian Balaj (Baia-Mare) |

| 8 April 2009 Matchday 23 | FC Vaslui | 2–1 | Oţelul Galaţi | Vaslui |
| 17:00 EET | Cânu 6'; Pavlović 17' | | Elek 54' | Stadium: Municipal; Attendance: 5 000; Referee: Marian Bordean (Sibiu) |

| 11 April 2009 Matchday 24 | Dinamo | 4–1 | FC Vaslui | București |
| 20:30 EET | M. Niculae 24' (pen.), 78', 90'; Zicu 87' | | Temwanjera 81' | Stadium: Dinamo; Attendance: 4 000; Referee: Ovidiu Haţegan (Arad) |

| 18 April 2009 Matchday 25 | FC Vaslui | 4–3 | FC Timișoara | Vaslui |
| 18:30 EET | Wesley 28'; S. Luchin 29' (o.g.); Temwanjera 70'; Milisavljević 87' | | Bucur 6', 9' (pen.); Karamyan 67' | Stadium: Municipal; Attendance: 8 000; Referee: Alexandru Deaconu (București) |

| 21 April 2009 Matchday 26 | Unirea Urziceni | 1–0 | FC Vaslui | Urziceni |
| 21:00 EET | Bilaşco 13' | | | Stadium: Tineretului; Attendance: 2 500; Referee: Georgian Ionescu (Buzău) |

| 25 April 2009 Matchday 27 | FC Vaslui | 0–1 | FC Brașov | Vaslui |
| 18:00 EET | | | Surdu 34' | Stadium: Municipal; Attendance: 5 000; Referee: Victor Berbecaru (Râmnicu-Vâlcea) |

| 3 May 2009 Matchday 28 | FC Argeş | 0–0 | FC Vaslui | Piteşti |
| 17:00 EET | | | | Stadium: Nicolae Dobrin; Attendance: 1 500; Referee: Mugurel Drăgănescu (Breaza) |

| 6 May 2009 Matchday 29 | FC Vaslui | 1–0 | Pandurii | Vaslui |
| 18:00 EET | Temwanjera 19' | | | Stadium: Municipal; Attendance: 4 000; Referee: Sebastian Colţescu (Craiova) |

| 9 May 2009 Matchday 30 | Gaz Metan Mediaş | 1–2 | FC Vaslui | Mediaş |
| 16:00 EET | Sabou 83' | | Genchev 80'; Wesley 89' | Stadium: Municipal; Attendance: 3 500; Referee: Radu Petrescu (București) |

| 17 May 2009 Matchday 31 | FC Vaslui | 2–0 | CS Otopeni | Vaslui |
| 19:00 EET | Genchev 7'; Zmeu 59' | | | Stadium: Municipal; Attendance: 5 000; Referee: Istvan Kovacs (Carei) |

| 23 May 2009 Matchday 32 | Gloria Buzău | 4–1 | FC Vaslui | Buzău |
| 17:00 EET | Mansour 27', 93'; Mera 78'; C. Ionescu 82' | | Wesley 49' (pen.) | Stadium: Crâng; Attendance: 2 000; Referee: Sebastian Colţescu (Craiova) |

| 30 May 2009 Matchday 33 | FC Vaslui | 1–0 | Rapid | Vaslui |
| 21:00 EET | Burdujan 35' | | | Stadium: Municipal; Attendance: 6 000; Referee: Gerharg Grobelnik (Austria) |

| 10 June 2009 Matchday 34 | Universitatea Craiova | 0–1 | FC Vaslui | Craiova |
| 20:00 EET | | | Wesley 11' | Stadium: Ion Oblemenco; Attendance: 25 000; Referee: Andrea De Marco (Italy) |

=== Cupa României ===
| 5 October 2008 Round of 32 | FC Vaslui | 3–0 | Poli Iaşi | Vaslui |
| 14:00 EET | Burdujan 28'; Gheorghiu 38'; Temwanjera 51' | | | Stadium: Municipal; Attendance: 2 000; Referee: Marius Avram |

| 12 October 2008 Round of 16 | FC Vaslui | 2–1 | CS Otopeni | Săcele |
| 13:00 EET | N. Jovanović 34'; Burdujan 28' (pen.) | | Sone 75' | Stadium: Electro-Precizia; Attendance: 100; Referee: Marius Martiş |

| 14 April 2009 Quarterfinals | FC Vaslui | 2–0 | Unirea Urziceni | Buzău |
| 20:45 EET | Wesley 33'; Genchev 79' | | | Stadium: Crâng; Attendance: 2 500; Referee: Marius Avram |

| 29 April 2009 Semifinals | FC Vaslui | 0–2 | CFR Cluj | Urziceni |
| 20:45 EET | | | Ruiz 11'; Pereira 92' | Stadium: Tineretului; Attendance: 400; Referee: Ionică Serea |

=== UEFA Cup ===
==== 2nd Qualifying Round ====
| 14 August 2008 | (Latvia) Metalurg Liepājas | 0–2 | FC Vaslui | Liepāja |
| 18:00 EET | | (Report) | N'Doye 69'; Genchev 73' | Stadium: Daugava; Attendance: 3 000; Referee: (Belarus) Alexey Kulbakov |

| 28 August 2008 | FC Vaslui | 3–1 | (Latvia) Metalurg Liepājas | Vaslui |
| 20:30 EET | Burdujan 5'; Cânu 7'; N'Doye 31' | (Report) | Antonio 86' | Stadium: Municipal; Attendance: 7 000; Referee: (Wales) Mark Whitby |

==== First round ====
| 18 September 2008 | (Czech Republic) Slavia Prague | 0–0 | FC Vaslui | Liepāja |
| 20:00 EET | | (Report) | | Stadium: Eden; Attendance: 7 600; Referee: (Georgia (country)) Levan Paniashvili |

| 2 October 2008 | FC Vaslui | 1–1 | (Czech Republic) Slavia Prague | Vaslui |
| 20:30 EET | Burdujan 21' | (Report) | Brabec 48' | Stadium: Municipal; Attendance: 8 500; Referee: (Northern Ireland) Mark Courtney |

=== UEFA Intertoto Cup ===
| 19 July 2008 | (Azerbaijan) Neftchi Baku | 2–1 | FC Vaslui | Baku |
| 19:00 EET | Herasymyuk 27'; Sadygov 84' | (Report) | Genchev 29' | Stadium: Tofik Bakhramov; Attendance: 30 000; Referee: (Russia) Igor Egorov |

| 26 July 2008 | FC Vaslui | 2–0 | (Azerbaijan) Neftchi Baku | Vaslui |
| 20:30 EET | Burdujan 30'; Temwanjera 38' | (Report) | | Stadium: Municipal; Attendance: 5 000; Referee: (Austria) Robert Schörgenhofer |
