= 2010–11 FC Vaslui season =

FC Vaslui
2010–11 season
- Owner: Adrian Porumboiu
- President: Ciprian Damian
- Manager: Viorel Hizo
- Stadium: Municipal
- Liga I: 3rd place
- Cupa României: Round of 32
- UEFA Europa League: Play-off
- Top goalscorer: League: Wesley (14 goals); All: Wesley (14 goals)
- Highest home attendance: 8,000 v. Steaua; 22 August 2010 Away 25,000 v. Universitatea Craiova; 23 October 2010
- Lowest home attendance: 1,000 v. Pandurii; 26 November 2010 Away 500 v. Unirea Urziceni; 29 August 2011

The 2010–11 season was the ninth season in FC Vaslui's existence, and its sixth in a row in Liga I. Having finished third last season, FC Vaslui is qualified for the play-off round in Europa League.

== First-team squad ==
No.	Name	Age	Nat.	Since	T. Apps.	L. Apps.	C. Apps.	I. Apps.	T. Goals	L. Goals	C. Goals	I. Goals	Ends	Transfer fee	Notes
Goalkeepers
1	Dušan Kuciak	25	(Slovakia)	2008	107	87	9	11	0	0	0	0	2013	€0.8M	
12	Vytautas Černiauskas	21	(Lithuania)	2010	4	4	0	0	0	0	0	0	2015	Undisclosed	
22	Claudiu Puia	23	(Romania)	2006	2	0	1	1	0	0	0	0	2011	Free	
Defenders
3	Paul Papp	20	(Romania)	2009 (W)	55	49	4	2	5	5	0	0	2013	€0.05M	
6	David Rivas	31	(Spain)	2010	13	12	0	1	0	0	0	0	2012	Free	
15	Richard Annang	19	(Ghana)	2010	6	5	1	0	0	0	0	0	2014	Undisclosed	
17	Silviu Bălace	31	(Romania)	2007	72	63	3	6	2	2	0	0	2011	€0.35M	
20	Zhivko Milanov	26	(Bulgaria)	2010 (W)	53	47	4	2	0	0	0	0	2013	€0.35M	
26	Pavol Farkaš	25	(Slovakia)	2009 (W)	47	40	4	3	2	2	0	0	2012	€0.2M	
28	Gabriel Cânu	29	(Romania)	2008	54	44	4	6	7	6	0	1	2011	€0.36M	
85	Gladstone	25	(Brazil)	2010 (W)	19	15	3	1	1	1	0	0	2013	Free	Injured
Midfielders
2	Alejandro Campano	31	(Spain)	2010	17	17	0	0	0	0	0	0	2012	Free	
4	Stanislav Genchev	29	(Bulgaria)	2008	97	82	4	11	8	5	1	2	2011	Free	
5	Denis Zmeu	25	(Moldova)	2007 (W)	83	67	10	6	2	2	0	0	2011	€0.2M	Injured
8	Adrian Gheorghiu	28	(Romania)	2006	111	99	7	5	10	9	1	0	2011	Undisclosed	
11	Nemanja Milisavljević	25	(Serbia)	2009 (W)	69	63	6	0	2	2	0	0	2012	€0.5M	
18	Lucian Sânmărtean	30	(Romania)	2010 (W)	50	44	4	2	3	2	1	0	2012	Free	
23	Miloš Pavlović	26	(Serbia)	2009 (W)	66	52	8	6	2	2	0	0	2012	€0.25M	Injured
27	Gerlem	25	(Brazil)	2009	34	29	1	4	4	4	0	0	2012	€0.6M	
30	Raul Costin	25	(Romania)	2009	60	51	6	3	6	4	2	0	2012	€0.1M	
80	Wesley	29	(Brazil)	2009 (W)	94	79	9	6	39	33	3	3	2013	€1.5M	
Forwards
7	Răzvan Neagu	23	(Romania)	2006	48	44	4	0	2	2	0	0	2011	Undisclosed	
9	Christian Pouga	24	(Cameroon)	2010	22	20	0	2	3	3	0	0	2013	Undisclosed	
10	Adaílton	33	(Brazil)	2010	30	29	1	0	11	11	0	0	2012	Free	
19	Mike Temwanjera	28	(Zimbabwe)	2007 (W)	115	99	6	10	30	24	3	3	2011	Undisclosed	
25	Yero Bello	22	(Nigeria)	2010	29	27	1	1	4	4	0	0	2013	€0.15M	

- T=Total
- L=Liga I
- C=Cupa României
- I=UEFA Europa League, Intertoto UEFA Cup

== Transfers ==
=== Summer ===
==== In ====
#	Pos	Player	From	Fee	Date
2	MF	(Spain) Alejandro Campano	Gimnàstic	free	16-07-2010
6	DF	(Spain) David Rivas	Real Betis	free	22-07-2010
8	FW	(Romania) Daniel Pancu	free agent	free	21-06-2010
9	FW	(Cameroon) Christian Pouga	Leixões S.C.	Undisclosed	10-08-2010
12	GK	(Lithuania) Vytautas Černiauskas	FK Ekranas	Undisclosed	18-07-2010
14	FW	(Brazil) Adaílton	Bologna	Free	3-08-2010
15	DF	(Ghana) Richard Annang	Tema Youth	Undisclosed	18-08-2010
21	FW	(Equatorial Guinea) Rodolfo Bodipo	Deportivo de La Coruña	Loan	11-07-2010
25	FW	(Nigeria) Yero Bello	Maccabi Haifa	€0.15 million	10-08-2010

==== Out ====
#	Pos	Player	To	Fee	Date
14	DF	(Togo) Serge Akakpo	NK Celje	Released	7-07-2010
15	DF	(Romania) Bogdan Buhuş	Universitatea Cluj	Free	30-07-2010
17	DF	(Romania) Dinu Sânmărtean	Unknown destination	Released	7-07-2010
21	FW	(Equatorial Guinea) Rodolfo Bodipo	Deportivo de La Coruña	Ended loan	24-08-2010
25	FW	(Spain) Roberto Delgado	Universitatea Cluj	Free	7-07-2010
TBA	MF	(Serbia) Marko Ljubinković	Sloboda Sevojno	Released	17-06-2010
TBA	DF	(Serbia) Neven Marković	Kerkyra	Released	17-06-2010
TBA	MF	(Romania) Marius Doboş	FCM Bacău	Released	17-06-2010
TBA	FW	(Serbia) Nemanja Jovanović	unknown destination	Released	7-07-2010
TBA	DF	(Romania) Bogdan Panait	CSMS Iaşi	Loan	01-09-2010
TBA	DF	(Romania) Vasile Buhăescu	CSMS Iaşi	Loan	01-09-2010

=== Winter ===
==== Out ====
#	Pos	Player	To	Fee	Date
8	FW	(Romania) Daniel Pancu	Rapid	Released	10-01-2011
81	GK	(Romania) Cristian Hăisan	FC Brașov	Released	4-12-2010
84	FW	(Romania) Lucian Burdujan	Steaua	Released	4-01-2011

== Statistics ==
=== Appearances and goals ===
Last updated on 21 May 2011.

No.	Pos	Nat	Player	Total		Liga I		Europa League		Cupa României	
No.	Pos	Nat	Player	Apps	Goals	Apps	Goals	Apps	Goals	Apps	Goals
1	GK	(Slovakia) SVK	Dušan Kuciak	33	-23	30	-23	2	0	1	0
2	DF	(Spain) ESP	Alejandro Campano	17	0	10+7	0	0	0	0	0
3	DF	(Romania) ROU	Paul Papp	35	3	32	3	2	0	1	0
4	MF	(Bulgaria) BUL	Stanislav Genchev	29	0	26+1	0	1+1	0	0	0
5	MF	(Moldova) MDA	Denis Zmeu	5	0	3+1	0	0	0	1	0
6	DF	(Spain) ESP	David Rivas	13	0	9+3	0	1	0	0	0
7	FW	(Romania) ROU	Răzvan Neagu	2	0	0+2	0	0	0	0	0
8	MF	(Romania) ROU	Adrian Gheorghiu	20	0	7+11	0	1	0	1	0
9	FW	(Cameroon) CMR	Christian Pouga	23	3	7+14	3	2	0	0	0
10	FW	(Brazil) BRA	Adaílton	30	11	27+2	11	0	0	0+1	0
11	MF	(Serbia) SRB	Nemanja Milisavljević	28	0	12+15	0	0	0	1	0
12	GK	(Lithuania) LTU	Vytautas Černiauskas	4	-5	4	-5	0	0	0	0
15	DF	(Ghana) GHA	Richard Annang	6	0	5	0	0	0	1	0
17	DF	(Romania) ROU	Silviu Bălace	17	1	12+5	1	0	0	0	0
18	MF	(Romania) ROU	Lucian Sânmărtean	32	2	27+2	2	2	0	0+1	0
19	FW	(Zimbabwe) ZIM	Mike Temwanjera	7	2	3+4	2	0	0	0	0
20	DF	(Bulgaria) BUL	Zhivko Milanov	33	0	30	0	2	0	1	0
22	GK	(Romania) ROU	Claudiu Puia	1	-2	0	0	0+1	-2	0	0
23	MF	(Serbia) SRB	Miloš Pavlović	12	0	9+1	0	2	0	0	0
25	FW	(Nigeria) NGA	Yero Bello	29	4	17+10	4	0+1	0	1	0
26	DF	(Slovakia) SVK	Pavol Farkas	11	0	8+2	0	1	0	0	0
27	MF	(Brazil) BRA	Willian Gerlem	5	0	4+1	0	0	0	0	0
28	DF	(Romania) ROU	Gabriel Cânu	24	4	23	4	0	0	1	0
30	MF	(Romania) ROU	Raul Costin	30	2	19+8	2	1+1	0	1	0
80	FW	(Brazil) BRA	Wesley	35	14	30+2	14	2	0	0+1	0
85	DF	(Brazil) BRA	Gladstone Pereira	5	1	4	1	1	0	0	0
Players sold or loaned out during the season
8	FW	(Romania) ROU	Daniel Pancu	6	0	0+5	0	0+1	0	0	0
21	FW	(Equatorial Guinea) EQG	Rodolfo Bodipo	3	0	2+1	0	0	0	0	0
27	DF	(Portugal) POR	Hugo Luz	9	0	7	0	2	0	0	0
81	GK	(Romania) ROU	Cristian Hăisan	0	0	0	0	0	0	0	0
84	FW	(Romania) ROU	Lucian Burdujan	9	2	6+2	2	0	0	1	0

=== Top scorers ===
Position	Nation	Number	Name	Liga I	Europa League	Romanian Cup	Total
1	(Brazil)	80	Wesley	14	0	0	14
2	(Brazil)	14	Adaílton	11	0	0	11
3	(Nigeria)	25	Yero Bello	4	0	0	4
=	(Romania)	28	Gabriel Cânu	4	0	0	4
5	(Cameroon)	9	Christian Pouga	3	0	0	3
=	(Romania)	3	Paul Papp	3	0	0	3
7	(Romania)	18	Lucian Sânmărtean	2	0	0	2
=	(Zimbabwe)	19	Mike Temwanjera	2	0	0	2
9	(Romania)	30	Raul Costin	2	0	0	2
=	(Romania)	84	Lucian Burdujan	2	0	0	2
=	(Romania)	17	Silviu Bălace	1	0	0	1
=	(Brazil)	85	Gladstone	1	0	0	1
/	/	/	Own Goals	2	0	0	2
			TOTALS	51	0	0	51

=== Disciplinary record ===
Position	Nation	Number	Name	Liga I		Europa League		Romanian Cup		Total	
Position	Nation	Number	Name	Booked	Sent off (straight red)	Booked	Sent off (straight red)	Booked	Sent off (straight red)	Booked	Sent off (straight red)
GK	(Slovakia)	1	Dušan Kuciak	3	0	0	1	0	0	3	1
CB	(Romania)	3	Paul Papp	8	0	1	0	0	0	9	0
CM	(Bulgaria)	4	Stanislav Genchev	7	0	1	0	0	0	8	0
CM	(Moldova)	5	Denis Zmeu	1	0	0	0	0	0	1	0
RM	(Romania)	8	Adrian Gheorghiu	2	0	1	0	0	0	3	0
CF	(Cameroon)	9	Christian Pouga	1	0	0	0	0	0	1	0
CF	(Brazil)	10	Adaílton	3	0	0	0	0	0	3	0
LM	(Serbia)	11	Nemanja Milisavljević	3	0	0	0	0	0	3	0
LB	(Romania)	17	Silviu Bălace	3	0	0	0	0	0	3	0
AM	(Romania)	18	Lucian Sânmărtean	7	1	0	0	0	1	7	2
CF	(Zimbabwe)	19	Mike Temwanjera	1	1	0	0	0	0	1	1
RB	(Bulgaria)	20	Zhivko Milanov	5	1	0	0	0	0	5	1
DM	(Serbia)	23	Miloš Pavlović	2	0	0	0	0	0	2	0
CF	(Nigeria)	25	Yero Bello	5	0	0	0	0	0	5	0
CB	(Slovakia)	26	Pavol Farkas	4	0	0	0	0	0	4	0
LB	(Portugal)	27	Hugo Luz	3	0	1	0	0	0	4	0
CB	(Romania)	28	Gabriel Canu	4	1	0	0	1	0	5	1
CM	(Romania)	30	Raul Costin	6	0	1	0	1	0	8	0
MF	(Brazil)	80	Wesley	7	0	0	0	0	0	7	0
RW	(Romania)	84	Lucian Burdujan	3	0	0	0	1	0	4	0
CB	(Brazil)	85	Gladstone	1	0	0	0	0	0	1	0
			TOTALS	77	4	5	1	3	1	85	6

=== Overall ===
Games played	37 (34 Liga I, 2 UEFA Europa League, 1 Cupa României)
Games won	18 (18 Liga I)
Games drawn	13 (11 Liga I, 1 UEFA Europa League, 1 Cupa României)
Games lost	6 (5 Liga I, 1 UEFA Europa League)
Goals scored	51
Goals conceded	30
Goal difference	+21
Yellow cards	85
Red cards	6
Worst discipline	(Romania) Lucian Sânmărtean with 7 yellow cards and 2 red cards
Best result	4–0 (H) v Oţelul Galaţi – Liga I – 13 Sep 2010
Worst result	0–3 (H) v Steaua – Liga I – 22 Aug 2010
Most appearances	(Brazil) Wesley with 35 appearances
Top scorer	(Brazil) Wesley (14 goals)
Points	65/102 (63.7%)

Last updated: 21 May

==== Performances ====
Updated to games played on 21 May 2011.

	All								Home						Away					
	Pld	Pts	W	D	L	GF	GA	GD	W	D	L	GF	GA	GD	W	D	L	GF	GA	GD
League	34	65	18	11	5	51	28	+23	12	4	1	34	14	+20	6	7	4	17	14	+3
Overall	37	–	18	13	6	51	30	+21	12	5	1	34	14	+20	6	8	5	17	16	+1

==== Goal minutes ====
Updated to games played on 21 May 2011.

1'–15'	16'–30'	31'–HT	46'–60'	61'–75'	76'–FT	Extra time
5	5	13	6	11	11	0

== Liga I ==
=== League table ===
Pos	Team	Pld	W	D	L	GF	GA	GD	Pts	Qualification or relegation
1	Oțelul Galați (C)	34	21	7	6	46	25	+21	70	Qualification to Champions League group stage
2	Politehnica Timișoara (R)	34	17	15	2	63	38	+25	66	Relegation to Liga II (Note: Timișoara and Gloria Bistrița were denied a licence for the 2011–12 season because of accumulated debt and were therefore relegated to Liga II. Sportul Studențesc as the only team from the relegated sides holding a Liga I licence were hence spared from relegation.)
3	Vaslui	34	18	11	5	51	28	+23	65	Qualification to Champions League third qualifying round
4	Rapid București	34	16	11	7	43	22	+21	59	Qualification to Europa League play-off round
5	Steaua București	34	16	9	9	44	27	+17	57	Qualification to Europa League play-off round (Note: Steaua București won the 2010–11 Cupa României competition and therefore qualified for the play-off round of the 2011–12 UEFA Europa League.)

Source: LPF (in Romanian)
Rules for classification: 1st points; 2nd head-to-head points; 3rd head-to-head goal difference; 4th head-to-head goals scored; 5th overall goal difference; 6th overall goals scored
(C) Champions; (R) Relegated

=== Results summary ===
Overall								Home						Away					
Pld	W	D	L	GF	GA	GD	Pts	W	D	L	GF	GA	GD	W	D	L	GF	GA	GD
34	18	11	5	51	28	+23	65	12	4	1	34	14	+20	6	7	4	17	14	+3

=== Results by round ===
Round	1	2	3	4	5	6	7	8	9	10	11	12	13	14	15	16	17	18	19	20	21	22	23	24	25	26	27	28	29	30	31	32	33	34
Ground	A	H	A	H	H	A	H	A	H	A	H	A	H	A	H	A	H	H	A	H	A	A	H	A	H	A	H	A	H	A	H	A	H	A
Result	L	D	D	W	L	L	W	W	W	D	W	W	W	L	D	W	W	D	W	W	D	D	W	D	W	D	W	L	W	W	D	D	W	W
Position	18	14	14	10	12	14	11	8	7	6	6	5	4	4	5	4	3	3	3	3	3	3	3	3	3	3	3	3	3	3	3	3	3	3

Updated to match(es) played on 21 May 2011. Source: LPF
A = Away; H = Home; W = Win; D = Draw; L = Loss

== Matches ==
=== Liga I ===
23 July 2010 Matchday 1	Rapid	2–0	SC Vaslui	București
20:30	Herea 28'; Césinha 83'			Stadium: Giuleşti; Attendance: 10 000; Referee: Cristian Balaj

30 July 2010 Matchday 2	SC Vaslui	1–1	FCM Târgu Mureş	Vaslui
20:30	Gladstone 90'		D. Roman 21'	Stadium: Municipal; Attendance: 5 000; Referee: Alexandru Deaconu

6 August 2010 Matchday 3	Universitatea Cluj	1–1	SC Vaslui	Alba Iulia
18:00	Čvirik 84'		Wesley 80' (pen.)	Stadium: Cetate; Attendance: 1 500; Referee: Augustus Constantin

14 August 2010 Matchday 4	SC Vaslui	2–1	FC Brașov	Vaslui
20:30	Papp 20'; Pouga 66'		Ionescu 23'	Stadium: Municipal; Attendance: 5 000; Referee: Georgian Ionescu

22 August 2010 Matchday 5	SC Vaslui	0–3	Steaua	Vaslui
20:00			Surdu 5', 53'; Stancu 46'	Stadium: Municipal; Attendance: 8 000; Referee: Ovidiu Haţegan

29 August 2010 Matchday 6	Unirea Urziceni	2–1	SC Vaslui	Urziceni
22:00	Maftei 25'; Bordeanu 40' (pen.)		Wesley 88' (pen.)	Stadium: Tineretului; Attendance: 500; Referee: Istvan Kovacs

13 September 2010 Matchday 7	SC Vaslui	4–0	Oţelul Galaţi	Vaslui
18:00	Adaílton 8', 55'; Wesley 30'; Pouga 69'			Stadium: Municipal; Attendance: 5 000; Referee: Robert Dumitru

19 September 2010 Matchday 8	Dinamo	1–2	SC Vaslui	București
20:30	Ganea 12'		Wesley 33', 39'	Stadium: Dinamo; Attendance: 4 000; Referee: Augustus Constantin

25 September 2010 Matchday 9	SC Vaslui	1–0	Gloria Bistriţa	Vaslui
18:00	Adaílton 66'			Stadium: Municipal; Attendance: 3 000; Referee: Marian Balaci

3 October 2010 Matchday 10	Gaz Metan Mediaş	0–0	SC Vaslui	Mediaş
16:00				Stadium: Gaz Metan; Attendance: 4 000; Referee: Alexandru Deaconu

15 October 2010 Matchday 11	SC Vaslui	5–3	CFR Cluj	Vaslui
22:00	Sânmărtean 26'; Adaílton 35', 58'; Burdujan 63', 87'		De Zerbi 59'; Bastos 90'; E. Dică 90'	Stadium: Municipal; Attendance: 4 000; Referee: Robert Dumitru

23 October 2010 Matchday 12	Universitatea Craiova	0–1	SC Vaslui	Craiova
20:30			Bello 42'	Stadium: Ion Oblemenco; Attendance: 25 000; Referee: Cristian Balaj

29 October 2010 Matchday 13	SC Vaslui	1–0	Victoria Brăneşti	Vaslui
18:30	Cânu 63'			Stadium: Municipal; Attendance: 3 000; Referee: Mihai Prodan

6 November 2010 Matchday 14	Poli Timișoara	2–1	SC Vaslui	Timișoara
20:30	Zicu 45' (pen.); Goga 69'		Papp 32'	Stadium: Dan Păltinişanu; Attendance: 8 000; Referee: Marius Avram

12 November 2010 Matchday 15	SC Vaslui	0–0	Astra Ploieşti	Vaslui
20:30				Stadium: Municipal; Attendance: 2 000; Referee: Radu Petrescu

21 November 2010 Matchday 16	Sportul Studenţesc	0–1	SC Vaslui	București
14:00			Bello 72'	Stadium: Regie; Attendance: 500; Referee: Alexandru Deaconu

26 November 2010 Matchday 17	SC Vaslui	3–1	Pandurii Târgu Jiu	Vaslui
20:30	Wesley 39'; Bello 45'; Costin 50'		Voiculeţ 48'	Stadium: Municipal; Attendance: 1 000; Referee: Adrian Comănescu

5 December 2010 Matchday 18	SC Vaslui	1–1	Rapid	Vaslui
20:30	Costin 43'		Herea 49'	Stadium: Municipal; Attendance: 3 000; Referee: Robert Dumitru

28 February 2011 Matchday 19	FCM Târgu Mureş	0–2	SC Vaslui	Târgu Mureş
14:30			Wesley 63', 86'	Stadium: Trans-Sil; Attendance: 1 000; Referee: Ovidiu Haţegan

7 March 2011 Matchday 20	SC Vaslui	2–0	Universitatea Cluj	Vaslui
20:30	Papp 41'; Adaílton 69'			Stadium: Municipal; Attendance: 4 000; Referee: Augustus Constantin

14 March 2011 Matchday 21	FC Brașov	1–1	SC Vaslui	Braşov
20:30	Kuciak 55' (o.g.)		Wesley 35'	Stadium: Silviu Ploeşteanu; Attendance: 5 000; Referee: Cristi Balaj

19 March 2011 Matchday 22	Steaua	1–1	SC Vaslui	București
20:30	Nicoliţă 51'		Adaílton 80'	Stadium: Ghencea; Attendance: Istvan Kovacs; Referee: 11 000

1 April 2011 Matchday 23	SC Vaslui	2–0	Unirea Urziceni	Vaslui
17:00	Sânmărtean 82'; Adaílton 93'			Stadium: Municipal; Attendance: 5 000; Referee: Andrei Chivulete

6 April 2011 Matchday 24	Oţelul Galaţi	0–0	SC Vaslui	Galaţi
17:30				Stadium: Oţelul; Attendance: 8 000; Referee: Ovidiu Haţegan

9 April 2011 Matchday 25	SC Vaslui	2–0	Dinamo	Vaslui
17:00	Wesley 26'; Cânu 46'			Stadium: Municipal; Attendance: 7 500; Referee: Robert Dumitru

12 April 2011 Matchday 26	Gloria Bistriţa	1–1	SC Vaslui	Bistriţa
20:30	Băjenaru 64' (pen.)		Temwanjera 8'	Stadium: Gloria; Attendance: 1 000; Referee: Alexandru Deaconu

18 April 2011 Matchday 27	SC Vaslui	3–0	Gaz Metan Mediaş	Vaslui
20:30	Wesley 20' (pen.); Adaílton 37'; Bello 42'			Stadium: Municipal; Attendance: 4 000; Referee: Sebastian Colţescu

23 April 2011 Matchday 28	CFR Cluj	1–0	SC Vaslui	Cluj-Napoca
14:00	Cadú 28' (pen.)			Stadium: Dr. Constantin Rădulescu; Attendance: 4 000; Referee: Robert Dumitru

27 April 2011 Matchday 29	SC Vaslui	2–1	Universitatea Craiova	Vaslui
19:00	Stoica 14' (o.g.); Wesley 82'		Subotić 41'	Stadium: Municipal; Attendance: 6 000; Referee: Cristian Sava

30 April 2011 Matchday 30	Victoria Brăneşti	1–3	SC Vaslui	Chiajna
17:00	Popa 12'		Wesley 3'; Cânu 65'; Adaílton 87'	Stadium: Concordia; Attendance: 1 000; Referee: Marius Avram

5 May 2011 Matchday 31	SC Vaslui	1–1	Poli Timișoara	Vaslui
19:30	Alexa 65' (o.g.)		Goga 73'	Stadium: Municipal; Referee: Sebastian Colţescu

9 May 2011 Matchday 32	Astra Ploieşti	1–1	SC Vaslui	Ploieşti
21:45	Fatai 93'		Temwanjera 15'	Stadium: Astra; Attendance: 500; Referee: Istvan Kovacs

15 May 2011 Matchday 33	SC Vaslui	4–2	Sportul Studenţesc	Vaslui
18:00	Bălace 36'; Pouga 58'; Adaílton 60'; Wesley 79'		Maxim 92' (pen.); Curelea 93'	Stadium: Municipal; Attendance: 2 000; Referee: Adrian Comănescu

21 May 2011 Matchday 34	Pandurii Târgu Jiu	0–1	SC Vaslui	Drobeta-Turnu Severin
18:00			Cânu 75'	Stadium: Municipal; Referee: Cristian Balaj

=== UEFA Europa League ===
==== Play-off ====
19 August 2010	SC Vaslui	0–0	(France) Lille OSC	Vaslui
20:00 EET		(Report)		Stadium: Municipal; Attendance: 3 821; Referee: (Turkey) Bülent Yıldırım

26 August 2010	(France) Lille OSC	2–0	SC Vaslui	Villeneuve-d'Ascq
21:45 EET	Cabaye 69' (pen.); Chedjou 80'	(Report)		Stadium: Stade Lille-Metropole; Attendance: 16 876; Referee: (Norway) Tom Harald Hagen

=== Cupa României ===
22 September 2010 Round of 32	Alro Slatina	0–0 (4–3 p)	SC Vaslui	Slatina
16:00 EET				Stadium: Metalurgistul; Attendance: 4 000; Referee: Georgian Ionescu
	Penalties
	Voicu (penalty scored); Dumitra (penalty scored); Kalai (penalty missed); Pasăre (penalty scored); Precup (penalty scored)		(penalty scored) Zmeu; (penalty scored) Milanov; (penalty scored) Adaílton; (penalty missed) Wesley; (penalty missed) Bello
