= Paul Papp =

Romanian footballer (born 1989)

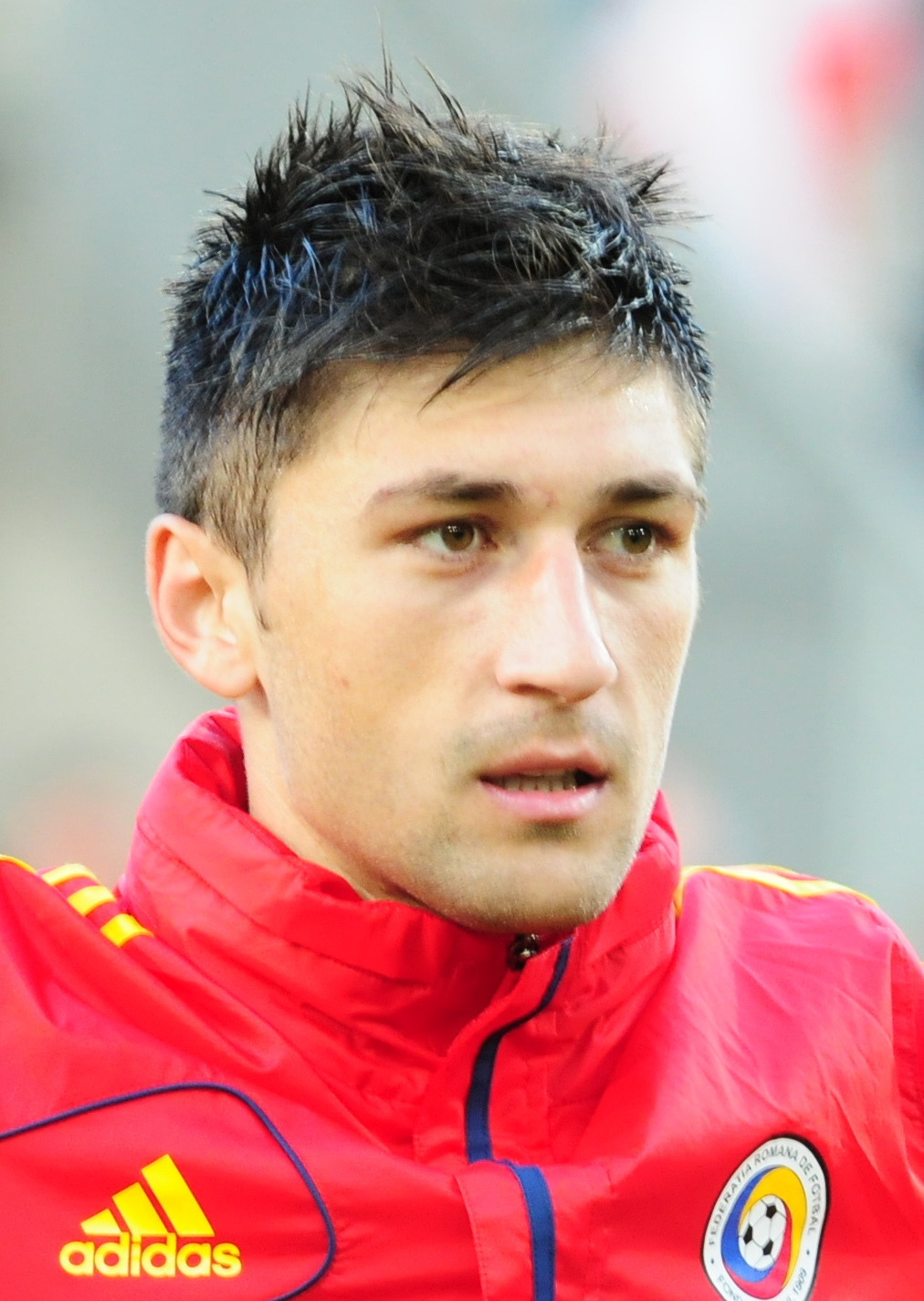
- Papp with Romania in 2012

Personal information
- Date of birth: 11 November 1989 (age 37)
- Place of birth: Dej, Romania
- Height: 1.88 m (6 ft 2 in)
- Position: Defender

Team information
- Current team: Petrolul Ploiești
- Number: 4

Youth career
- 2000–2006: Luceafărul Dej

Senior career*
Years	Team	Apps	(Gls)
2006–2008	Unirea Dej	38	(3)
2008	Botoșani	14	(0)
2009–2012	Vaslui	74	(6)
2009	→ Farul Constanța (loan)	10	(0)
2012–2014	Chievo	14	(1)
2014	→ Astra Giurgiu (loan)	11	(1)
2014	→ Steaua București (loan)	10	(2)
2015–2016	Steaua București	27	(1)
2016–2017	Wil	16	(3)
2017–2018	Karabükspor	26	(1)
2018–2020	Sivasspor	22	(0)
2020–2023	Universitatea Craiova	56	(3)
2023–	Petrolul Ploiești	130	(6)

International career
2007	Romania U19	1	(0)
2009–2010	Romania U21	9	(1)
2011–2015	Romania	20	(3)
- * Club domestic league appearances and goals as of 6 November 2026

Paul Papp (born 11 November 1989) is a Romanian professional footballer who plays as a defender for Liga I club Petrolul Ploiești, which he captains.

== Club career ==
=== Unirea Dej ===
Born in Dej, Papp started out playing for hometown team Unirea.

=== Botoşani ===
In June 2008, Papp and teammate Adrian Boroştean were signed by FC Botoşani. At age 18, he wore the captain's armband, right on his league debut for his new team. He led his team to a 2–1 win against Dunărea Giurgiu. Two months later, he led his team to a historical qualification to Romanian Cup's eighth finals, the highest performance for the past 20 years for Botoşani. Despite his team's up and down half season, Papp was voted the best central defender from Liga II by the reader of liga2.ro website In mid-2009, rumours began circulating that the club were in dire financial trouble and that new manager Alin Bejan would be forced to part with his star players for a substantial amount of cash. Although he was not on the transfer list, following his solid performances for Botoşani, many Liga I clubs linked the young defender.

=== Vaslui ===
In February 2009, Papp and teammate Marius Ştefoi were signed by Vaslui that acquired 85% of the players rights. Papp made his Vaslui first-team debut on 17 May 2009 in a match against CS Otopeni as a late substitute for Marko Ljubinković. Struggling to find himself in Vaslui's first-team, on 9 September, Papp was loaned out to Farul Constanţa in order to gain experience. Papp's career began to take-off when he was recalled from his loan due to his progress at Farul and was pushed into the first-team. On 1 February 2010, Papp was seen as a straight replacement for Dinamo captain Tamaș, after his departure, but Marius Lăcătuș rejected any offer for the young defender. On 21 February, he was in the startup team against Gaz Metan Mediaş, being handed the no. 3 shirt. On 22 March, he scored his first three-points goal for Vaslui, against Rapid București. He scored his second goal on 10 May in a 2–1 win against Steaua București, Papp scoring Vaslui's second 8 minutes until the final whistle. He missed a single match during the 2009–10 campaign, due to yellow card accumulation, and helped his team reaching the 3rd place in Liga I, and the Romanian Cup final, eventually lost at the penalty shootout. He played 120 full minutes, on 26 May, against CFR Cluj in the Romanian Cup final, and he was declared the Man of the Match by the Romanian Football Federation.

Papp shrugged off the utility tag and established himself as a centre half. He scored his season's first goal on 14 August, in a league match against FC Brașov. The final score was 2–1, with Papp scoring Vaslui's first with a header from Lucian Sânmărtean's corner. On 19 August, he made his European debut, playing 90 full minutes against French side Lille OSC. On 22 September, he partnered Gabriel Cânu in the central defense, for the first time. Vaslui conceding only 15 goals with Papp and Cânu in the startup team. He scored his fourth league goal for Vaslui on 6 November, in a 1–2 loss against FC Timişoara. He scored Vaslui's only goal with a volley from Adaílton's corner. One week later, he captained Vaslui for the first time, following Cânu's red card received in the previous round. On 6 December, Papp was awarded the Defender of The Year award from FRF at the Romanian Football Ceremony from Bucharest. On 7 March 2011, Papp scored a headed goal for Vaslui against Universitatea Cluj in his second league appearance from 2011 whilst making his appearance in an unfamiliar right-back position. Following Luz's long term-injury and Bălace's bad shape, Milanov was sent to play on the left side and Papp on the right. However, he was sent back in the central defense, following his unsuccessful try out. In his second season since his establishment in the first-team, he finished third with his team, for the second year in a row.

Following his injury suffered at Romania's training, Papp missed the Sparta Prague double. However, it is believed that he will be fit to play in the UEFA Europa League Group Stages. He made his come-back on 22 September, wearing the captain's armband and leading his team to an emphatic 8–0 victory over Voinţa Livezile, in the Romanian Cup.

=== Chievo Verona ===
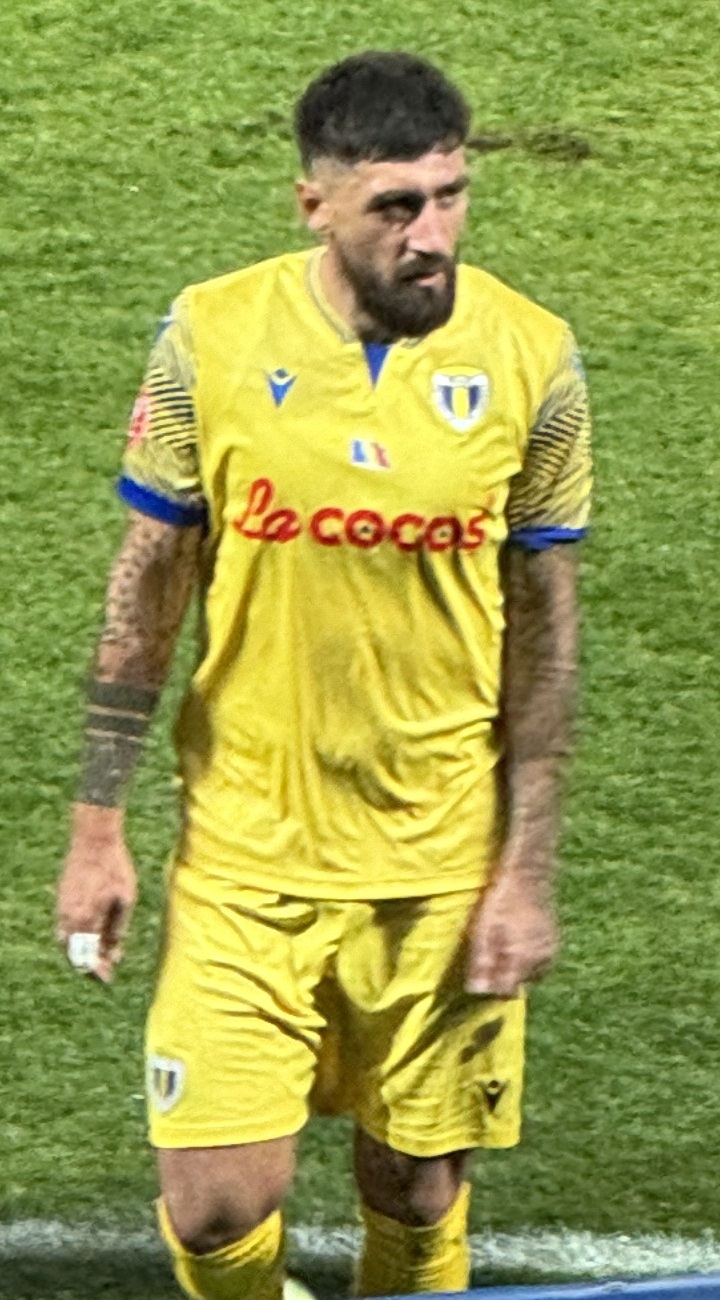
Papp playing for Petrolul Ploiești in 2023

On 31 May, Chievo Verona reported that they have signed Romanian international, Paul Papp for an undisclosed fee.

Later that day, Vaslui owner Adrian Porumboiu confirmed that Chievo Verona acquired 75% of the player's rights. Media reports estimated the transfer fee to be between €1.5 million and €2.5 million.

On 7 April 2013, Papp scored his first goal in Serie A, in an away game against Udinese, to make 1–2 in an eventual 3–1 loss.

=== Astra Giurgiu ===
On 26 January 2014, he went on loan to Astra Giurgiu for the remainder of the season. He scored the winning goal against Petrolul Ploiești in the second leg of the semi-final to qualify Astra who would then win the final against Steaua Bucharest on penalties.

=== Steaua București ===
On 29 August 2014, he went on loan to Steaua for one season with buy option. After a good start of season, which brought him back to the attention of the national team, Steaua offered him a contract for five seasons.

== International career ==
In October 2007 he was called up to the Romania Under-19 squad for the first time.

Following his successful loan to Farul, he was called up for the Romania Under-21 on 7 November 2009. Papp scored his first goal for the Romania Under-21 side, right on his debut match, in a qualification game for the 2011 European Under-21 Championship, against Latvia. He captained his side for the first time, following Torje and Găman's injuries, on 29 May 2010, in the friendly match, lost by Romania against Belarus. On 7 September, Papp was in the startup team for Romania U-21, in a 3–0 win against Russia. The win secured Romania a place in the playoff stage of the 2011 European Under-21 Championship qualifiers. However, he missed the chance to play at the 2011 European Under-21 Championship, after Romania lost the play-off over England.

The draw against England, was also his last match for Romania U-21, because on 28 January 2011, Papp was called up for the first time for the senior team of Romania. On 8 February 2011, he made his full debut for Romania, in a draw against Ukraine. He missed the second penalty from the penalty shootout. He played his first official match for Romania, in a qualification game for UEFA Euro 2012 against Bosnia and Herzegovina. On 8 June, he was in the startup team against Brazil in the Testimonial game of Ronaldo. On 5 August, Papp suffered a meniscus tear while he was training for Romania. The injury will force him out from the field for almost two months.

== Career statistics ==
=== Club ===
As of match played 6 November 2026

Appearances and goals by club, season and competition
Club	Season	League			National cup (Note: Includes Cupa României, Coppa Italia, Swiss Cup, Turkish Cup)		League cup (Note: Includes Cupa Ligii)		Continental		Other		Total	
Club	Season	Division	Apps	Goals	Apps	Goals	Apps	Goals	Apps	Goals	Apps	Goals	Apps	Goals
Unirea Dej	2006–07	Liga II	9	0	?	?	—		—		—		9	0
Unirea Dej	2007–08	Liga II	29	3	?	?	—		—		—		29	3
Unirea Dej	Total		38	3	?	?	—		—		—		38	3
Botoşani	2008–09	Liga II	14	0	4	0	—		—		—		18	0
Vaslui	2008–09	Liga I	1	0	0	0	—		—		—		1	0
Vaslui	2009–10	Liga I	16	2	3	0	—		—		—		19	2
Vaslui	2010–11	Liga I	32	3	1	0	—		2 (Note: Appearances in UEFA Europa League)	0	—		35	3
Vaslui	2011–12	Liga I	25	1	5	0	—		6 (Note: Two appearances in UEFA Champions League, four appearances in UEFA Europa League)	0	—		36	1
Vaslui	Total		74	6	9	0	—		8	0	—		91	6
Farul Constanţa (loan)	2009–10	Liga II	10	0	2	0	—		—		—		12	0
Chievo	2012–13	Serie A	8	1	1	0	—		—		—		9	1
Chievo	2013–14	Serie A	6	0	2	0	—		—		—		8	0
Chievo	Total		14	1	3	0	—		—		—		17	1
Astra Giurgiu (loan)	2013–14	Liga I	11	1	1	1	—		—		—		12	2
Steaua București (loan)	2014–15	Liga I	20	2	5	0	3	0	6	0	—		34	2
Steaua București (loan)	2015–16	Liga I	17	1	3	0	3	0	6 (Note: Four appearances in UEFA Champions League, two appearances in UEFA Europa League)	0	0	0	29	1
Steaua București (loan)	Total		37	3	8	0	6	0	12	0	0	0	63	3
Wil	2016–17	Swiss Challenge League	16	3	1	0	—		—		—		17	3
Karabükspor	2016–17	Süper Lig	12	1	—		—		—		—		12	1
Karabükspor	2017–18	Süper Lig	14	0	1	0	—		—		—		15	0
Karabükspor	Total		26	1	1	0	—		—		—		27	1
Sivasspor	2017–18	Süper Lig	3	0	0	0	—		—		—		3	0
Sivasspor	2018–19	Süper Lig	16	0	1	0	—		—		—		17	0
Sivasspor	2019–20	Süper Lig	3	0	6	0	—		—		—		9	0
Sivasspor	Total		22	0	7	0	—		—		—		29	0
Universitatea Craiova	2020–21	Liga I	18	1	2	0	—		0	0	—		20	1
Universitatea Craiova	2021–22	Liga I	21	1	3	0	—		0	0	1 (Note: Appearance in Liga I play-offs for UEFA Europa Conference League)	0	25	1
Universitatea Craiova	2022–23	Liga I	17	1	1	0	—		4 (Note: Appearances in UEFA Europa Conference League)	0	—		22	1
Universitatea Craiova	Total		56	3	6	0	—		4	0	1	0	67	3
Petrolul Ploiești	2022–23	Liga I	12	0	—		—		—		—		12	0
Petrolul Ploiești	2023–24	Liga I	35	1	0	0	—		—		—		35	1
Petrolul Ploiești	2024–25	Liga I	34	2	1	0	—		—		—		35	2
Petrolul Ploiești	2025–26	Liga I	35	2	1	0	—		—		—		36	2
Petrolul Ploiești	2026–27	Liga I	14	1	2	0	—		—		—		16	1
Petrolul Ploiești	Total		130	6	4	0	—		—		—		134	6
Career total			448	27	46	1	6	0	24	0	1	0	525	28

=== International ===
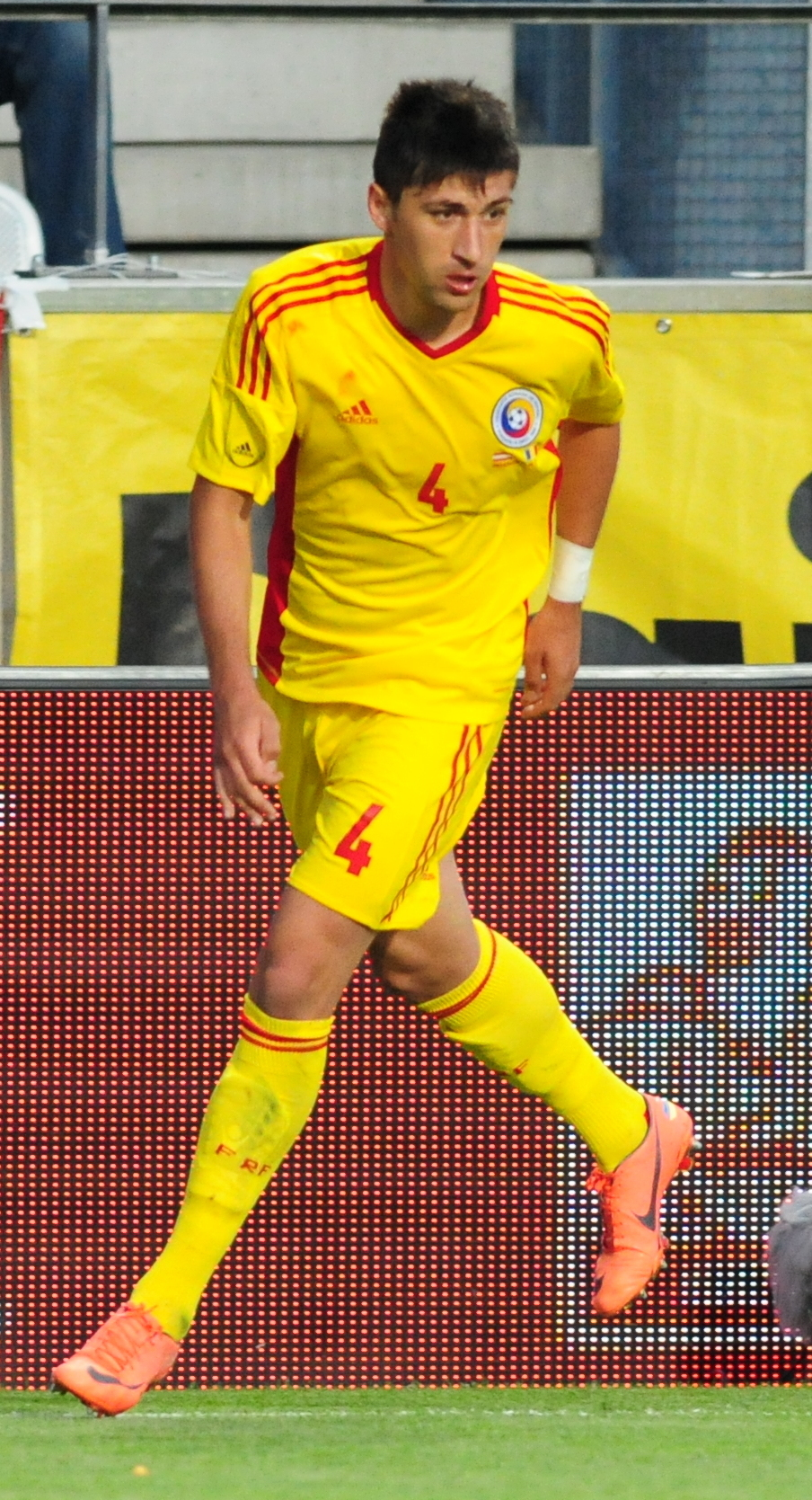
Papp in a match against Austria in 2012

As of match played 8 October 2015

Appearances and goals by national team and year
National team	Year	Apps	Goals
Romania
Romania	2011	5	1
Romania	2012	6	0
Romania	2013	0	0
Romania	2014	2	2
Romania	2015	7	0
Total		20	3

Scores and results list Romania's goal tally first, score column indicates score after each Papp goal.

List of international goals scored by Paul Papp
No.	Date	Venue	Opponent	Score	Result	Competition
1	15 August 2012	Stadion Stožice, Ljubljana, Slovenia	Slovenia	1–2	3–4	Friendly
2	14 November 2014	Arena Națională, Bucharest, Romania	Northern Ireland	1–0	2–0	Euro 2016 qualifier
3	14 November 2014	Arena Națională, Bucharest, Romania	Northern Ireland	2–0	2–0	Euro 2016 qualifier

== Honours ==
Vaslui

- Cupa României runner-up: 2009–10

Astra Giurgiu

- Cupa României: 2013–14

Steaua București

- Liga I: 2014–15
- Cupa României: 2014–15
- Cupa Ligii: 2014–15, 2015–16

Universitatea Craiova

- Cupa României: 2020–21
- Supercupa României: 2021
