= Pavol Farkaš =

Slovak footballer

Personal information
- Full name: Pavol Farkaš
- Date of birth: 27 March 1985 (age 41)
- Place of birth: Vráble, Czechoslovakia
- Height: 1.91 m (6 ft 3 in)
- Position: Centre back

Team information
- Current team: BFC OÚ Dolné Obdokovce

Youth career
- –2003: Nitra

Senior career*
Years	Team	Apps	(Gls)
2003–2007	Nitra	59	(2)
2007–2008	Artmedia Petržalka	31	(0)
2009–2012	Vaslui	59	(2)
2012–2014	Chievo Verona	4	(0)
2013–2014	→ Ternana (loan)	28	(1)
2014–2015	Gabala	15	(2)
2015–2016	Xanthi	6	(0)
2016–2018	AEL	35	(1)
2018–2020	Nitra	53	(3)
2020	Spartak Myjava	8	(0)
2021	Petržalka	13	(0)

International career
2006–2014	Slovakia	3	(0)

Managerial career
- 2024-2026: MFK Skalica (Assistant)
- * Club domestic league appearances and goals

Pavol Farkaš (born 27 March 1985) is a Slovak former professional footballer who played a centre-back.

== Club career ==
=== Early club career ===
Farkas spent three seasons with Nitra and two with Artmedia Petržalka, appearing in 80 league matches. In the summer of 2008, he signed a contract with Romanian Liga I side Vaslui.

On 3 July 2012, Farkaš signed a one-year contract with Chievo Verona, in the Italian Serie A. He went on loan to Serie B club Ternana on 16 July 2013.

Farkaš signed a one-year contract with Azerbaijan Premier League club Gabala on 6 July 2014, leaving the club upon its completion in June 2015.

=== Greece ===
On 29 July 2015, Farkaš signed a one-year contract with Super League club Xanthi.

In July 2016, Farkaš signed a one-year contract with Super League side AEL. He made his official debut for the club on 12 September 2016 in a 2-2 home draw against Iraklis. On 18 March 2017 he scored the only goal in a crucial home win against Panetolikos. He renewed his contract for another year after a decent season with 27 appearances and one goal. On 29 January 2018 he left the club by mutual consent. After playing for Petržalka, he finished his professional career following the 2020–21 season.

== International career ==
Farkaš debuted for the Slovak senior squad in an infamous goalless friendly draw against Gibraltar in November 2013.

== Post-retirement ==
In September 2022, Farkaš joined the arriving staff of Francesco Calzona, who was appointed the manager of Slovakia. Since Calzona nor his staff were fluent in spoken English, Farkaš, an experienced international footballer with knowledge of Italian including footballing terminology, was onboarded as an on-field translator and communications liaison.

== Career statistics ==
As of match played 18 December 2014

Club statistics
Season	Club	League	League		Cup		Europe		Total	
Season	Club	League	App	Goals	App	Goals	App	Goals	App	Goals
2005–06	Nitra	Slovak Super Liga	25	0	6	0	0	0	31	0
2006–07	Nitra	Slovak Super Liga	31	2	1	0	4	0	36	2
2007–08	Nitra	Slovak Super Liga	3	0	0	0	0	0	3	0
2007–08	Artmedia	Slovak Super Liga	17	0	4	0	4	0	25	0
2008-09	Artmedia	Slovak Super Liga	14	0	1	0	5	1	20	1
2008–09	Vaslui	Liga I	16	2	2	0	0	0	18	2
2009–10	Vaslui	Liga I	14	0	2	0	2	0	18	0
2010–11	Vaslui	Liga I	10	0	0	0	1	0	11	0
2011–12	Vaslui	Liga I	19	0	3	0	10	0	32	0
2012–13	Chievo Verona	Serie A	4	0	1	0	—		5	0
2013–14	Ternana (loan)	Serie B	28	1	1	1	—		29	2
2014–15	Gabala	Azerbaijan Premier League	13	1	1	1	0	0	14	2
Total	Slovakia		90	2	12	0	13	1	115	3
Total	Romania		59	2	7	0	13	0	79	2
Total	Italy		32	1	2	1	-		34	2
Total	Azerbaijan		13	1	1	1	0	0	14	2
Career total			194	6	22	2	26	1	242	9

== Career honours ==
Petržalka

- Slovak First Football League: 2007-08
- Slovak Cup: 2007-08

Vaslui

- Liga I: runner-up 2011–12
- Cupa României: runner-up 2010
