= Stanislav Genchev =

Bulgarian footballer

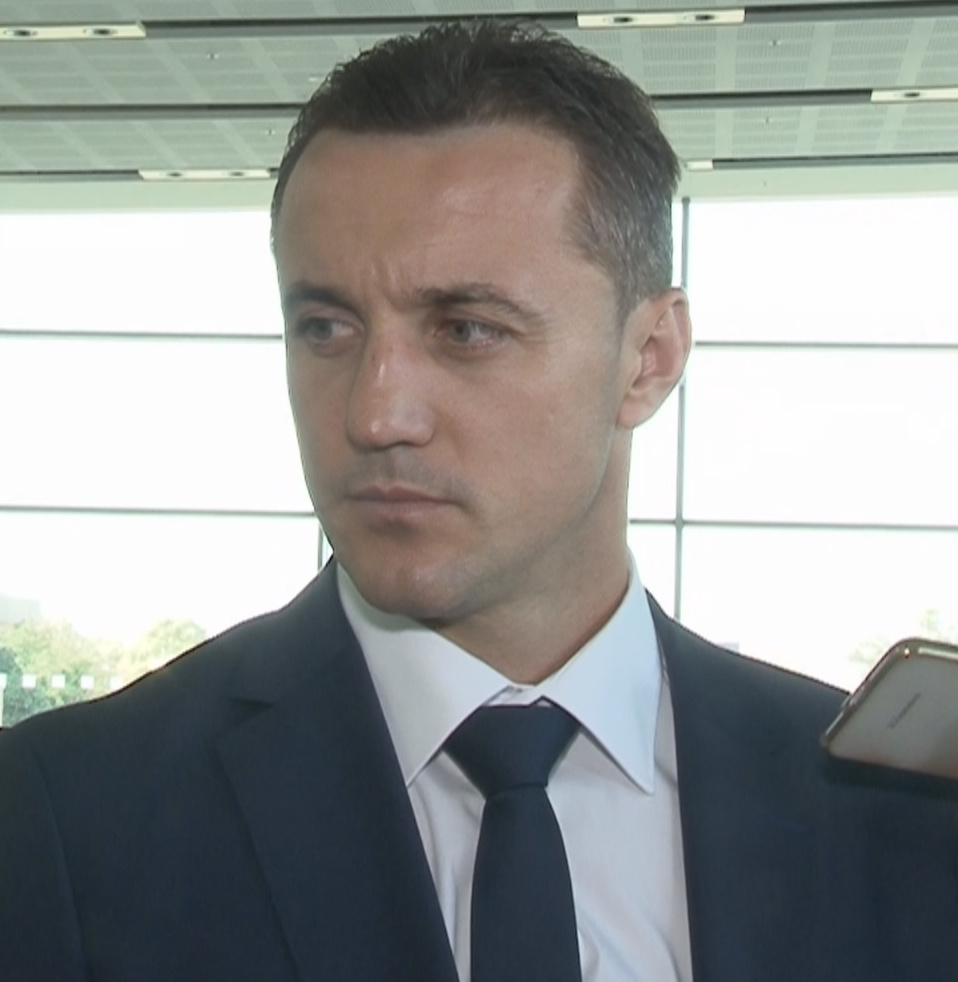

Personal information
- Full name: Stanislav Petrov Genchev
- Date of birth: 20 March 1981 (age 45)
- Place of birth: Dryanovo, Bulgaria
- Height: 1.85 m (6 ft 1 in)
- Position: Midfielder

Team information
- Current team: Botev Plovdiv

Youth career
- Etar Veliko Tarnovo

Senior career*
Years	Team	Apps	(Gls)
1998–2005	Levski Sofia	57	(6)
2000	→ Spartak Varna (loan)	14	(2)
2000–2001	→ Velbazhd (loan)	26	(4)
2003–2004	→ Cherno More (loan)	29	(4)
2005–2008	Litex Lovech	79	(8)
2008–2011	Vaslui	82	(5)
2011–2013	Ludogorets Razgrad	55	(9)
2013	Litex Lovech	5	(0)
2014	AEL Limassol	10	(0)
2014–2015	Slavia Sofia	13	(1)
2015–2016	Montana	28	(1)
2016–2017	Etar Veliko Tarnovo	27	(2)
Total		425	(42)

International career
2008–2010	Bulgaria	5	(1)

Managerial career
- 2016: Etar Veliko Tarnovo (assistant)
- 2017–2018: Etar Veliko Tarnovo
- 2018–2019: Etar Veliko Tarnovo (assistant)
- 2019: Bulgaria (assistant)
- 2019–2022: Ludogorets Razgrad (assistant)
- 2019: Ludogorets Razgrad (interim)
- 2020–2021: Ludogorets Razgrad (interim)
- 2021–2022: Ludogorets Razgrad (interim)
- 2022–2023: Lokomotiv Sofia
- 2023: Botev Plovdiv
- 2023–2024: Krumovgrad
- 2024: Levski Sofia
- 2025–2026: Lokomotiv Sofia
- 2026–: Botev Plovdiv
- * Club domestic league appearances and goals

Stanislav Petrov Genchev (Bulgarian: Станислав Петров Генчев; born 20 March 1981) is a Bulgarian former footballer and current manager of Bulgarian club Botev Plovdiv.

== Club career ==
=== SC Vaslui ===
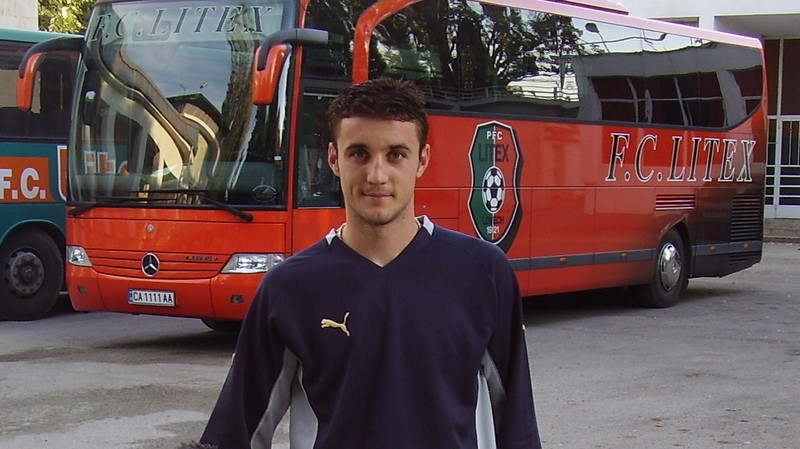
Genchev as a player in 2008

SC Vaslui signed Genchev as a free player, on 14 June 2008. Genchev signed a three-year contract. He scored in his first game for SC Vaslui, in a 2–1 defeat against Neftchi Baku, scoring with a 25 metres shot. He played as a defensive midfielder, central midfielder, right midfielder, central defender and as a right defender, having some great performances. On 4 August, against Omonia Nicosia, he played for 10 minutes, as a goalkeeper, after Kuciak was sent off.

=== Ludogorets Razgrad ===
Genchev featured regularly for Ludogorets and was an important player for the team during the 2011/2012 season. On 18 November 2012, he scored a brace against Levski Sofia to help his team to a 2–1 win and enable it to reclaim the top spot in the A PFG table.

On 2 June 2017, Genchev announced his official retirement as player.

== International career ==
In March 2008, the Bulgarian national coach Plamen Markov called up Stanislav Genchev to Bulgaria national football team for a friendly match with Finland. On 26 March 2008, Genchev made his debut for Bulgaria. He played for 25 minutes and scored the winning goal in the 90th minute. The result of the match was 2–1 in favour of Bulgaria. Genchev's last call-up to the national team was in October 2011 (under caretaker manager Mihail Madanski) for a Euro 2012 qualifier against Wales.

== Managerial career ==
In June 2023, Genchev was appointed as head coach of Botev Plovdiv. In August 2023, he was released from the team after a disappointing start to the season.

== Playing statistics ==
=== Club ===
Appearances and goals by club, season and competition
Club	Season	League		Cup		Europe		Total	
Club	Season	Apps	Goals	Apps	Goals	Apps	Goals	Apps	Goals
Levski Sofia	1998–99	2	1	0	0	0	0	2	1
Levski Sofia	1999–2000	1	0	1	0	1	0	3	0
Levski Sofia	2001–02	20	3	1	1	5	0	26	4
Levski Sofia	2002–03	17	1	8	1	6	0	31	2
Levski Sofia	2004–05	17	1	3	0	4	0	24	1
Levski Sofia	Total	57	6	13	2	16	0	86	8
Spartak Varna (loan)	1999–00	14	2	0	0	—		14	2
Velbazhd Kyustendil (loan)	2000–01	26	4	1	0	—		27	4
Cherno More (loan)	2003–04	29	4	3	1	—		32	5
Litex Lovech	2005–06	27	1	2	1	9	0	38	2
Litex Lovech	2006–07	28	5	4	0	5	1	35	6
Litex Lovech	2007–08	24	2	4	0	4	1	33	3
Litex Lovech	Total	79	8	10	1	18	2	107	11
SC Vaslui	2008–09	34	3	3	1	6	2	43	6
SC Vaslui	2009–10	21	2	1	0	3	0	25	2
SC Vaslui	2010–11	27	0	0	0	2	0	29	0
SC Vaslui	Total	82	5	4	1	11	2	97	8
Ludogorets Razgrad	2011–12	27	6	4	1	0	0	31	7
Ludogorets Razgrad	2012–13	28	3	1	0	2	0	31	3
Ludogorets Razgrad	Total	55	9	5	1	2	0	62	10
Litex Lovech	2013–14	5	0	0	0	0	0	5	0
AEL Limassol	2013–14	10	0	0	0	0	0	10	0
Slavia Sofia	2014–15	13	1	1	0	—		14	1
Montana	2015–16	28	1	4	0	—		32	1
Etar Veliko Tarnovo	2016–17	27	2	1	0	—		28	2
Career total		425	42	42	6	47	4	514	52

=== International ===
Scores and results list Bulgaria's goal tally first.

#	Date	Venue	Opponent	Score	Result	Competition
1.	26 March 2008	Vasil Levski National Stadium, Sofia	Finland	2–1	2–1	Friendly

== Managerial statistics ==
As of 27 April 2026

Team	From	To	Record							
Team	From	To	G	W	D	L	Win %	GF	GA	GD
(Bulgaria) Etar Veliko Tarnovo	8 January 2017	30 June 2017	28	10	11	7	35.71	37	39	-2
(Bulgaria) Ludogorets Razgrad (interim)	9 September 2019	31 December 2019	20	13	5	2	65.00	35	15	+20
(Bulgaria) Ludogorets Razgrad (interim)	28 October 2020	3 January 2021	11	5	1	5	45.45	16	21	-5
(Bulgaria) Ludogorets Razgrad (interim)	9 October 2021	3 January 2022	16	9	1	6	56.25	32	21	+11
(Bulgaria) Lokomotiv Sofia	25 May 2022	6 June 2023	41	14	10	17	34.15	50	56	-6
(Bulgaria) Botev Plovdiv	8 June 2023	22 August 2023	6	0	2	4	0.00	3	9	-6
(Bulgaria) Krumovgrad	28 October 2023	31 May 2024	21	8	7	6	38.10	32	26	+6
(Bulgaria) Levski Sofia	1 June 2024	16 December 2024	21	15	1	5	71.43	38	14	+24
(Bulgaria) Lokomotiv Sofia	30 May 2025	Present	33	10	11	12	30.30	45	44	+1
Total			197	84	49	64	42.64	288	245	+43

== Honours ==
Levski Sofia

- Bulgarian A Football Group: 2001–02
- Bulgarian Cup: 2001–02, 2002–03, 2004–05

Ludogorets Razgrad

- Bulgarian A Football Group: 2011–12, 2012–13
- Bulgarian Cup: 2011–12

Litex Lovech

- Bulgarian Cup: 2007–08

Etar

- Bulgarian Second League: 2016–17

FC Vaslui

- UEFA Intertoto Cup: 2008

=== Individual ===
- FC Vaslui Player of the Season: 2008–09
