= Cristian Hăisan =

Romanian footballer

Personal information
- Date of birth: 3 March 1981 (age 45)
- Place of birth: Iași, Romania
- Height: 1.82 m (6 ft 0 in)
- Position: Goalkeeper

Youth career
- Dacia Unirea Brăila

Senior career*
Years	Team	Apps	(Gls)
1999–2002	Rocar București	1	(0)
2001	→ Metalul Plopeni (loan)	0	(0)
2002–2010	Vaslui	85	(0)
2005	→ Altay Constanța (loan)	13	(0)
2009	→ FCM Bacău (loan)	12	(0)
2011	FC Brașov	4	(0)
2011	Mioveni	6	(0)
2012	CSMS Iași	1	(0)
2012	Buftea	6	(0)
2013–2014	Metaloglobus București	3	(0)
2016–2018	Gauss Bacău		
Total		131	(0)

International career^{‡}
2008	Romania "B"	1	(0)

Managerial career
- 2014–2016: FC Bacău (youth)
- * Club domestic league appearances and goals as of 3 September 2018 ‡ National team caps and goals as of 16 June 2008

Cristian Hăisan (born 3 March 1981) is a Romanian former footballer who played as a goalkeeper mainly for FC Vaslui, but also for teams such as Rocar București, Altay Constanța or FCM Bacău, among others.

The son of Dacia Unirea Brăila goalkeeper Cătălin Hăisan, Cristi began his career with his father's team, being one of the few footballers who manage to play with his father. He transferred while young, to Rocar București and made his Liga I debut on 4 August 1999, at only 18 years old. In 2010, FC Vaslui reached the Romanian Cup Final, matching the feat achieved by his father in 1993, but they lost to CFR Cluj, same as his father did 17 years ago.

== Club career ==
He started his career as a striker, but soon he changed his position as a goalkeeper, same as his father Cătălin played. He started his career with Dacia Unirea Brăila's youth, but he transferred soon to a Divizia A team, because he was a talented young goalkeeper. He spelled three years in București, with a short spell at Metalul Plopeni in 2001, when he was loaned from Rocar.

=== FC Vaslui ===
He signed with FC Vaslui short after its foundation, but he was for almost three years only the second or the third-choice keeper for his team. In the 2004–05 winter break, he was loaned to the Liga II team Altay Constanța. He returned to Vaslui at the beginning of the new season, the first in Liga I for Vaslui. He was still the third-choice keeper, but following Pesic and Kajcsa's mistakes, Mircea Rednic decided to put Hăisan in the start-up team. He managed to keep three clean sheets in a row since his debut in Liga I, establishing himself as the first-choice keeper. In his fourth match, a game against Poli Timișoara, he got injured in the 30th minute, while it was still 0–0, but Vaslui eventually lost the game with 2–0. Hăisan remained the first-choice keeper until the end of 2005, managing to receive only 6 goals in 8 games, while the other two keepers received 15 goals in the same number of games. He lost his place in the winter break, following the arrival of the former Romania U21 keeper, Sebastian Huțan.

In the new season, once again, because of the first-choice keeper's weak form, Hăisan re-established himself as the first-choice keeper, for the next two years. He was in an incredible form, being a real "angel" for his team. His good evolutions, brought attention from Pițurcă, who called him for a friendly match between Romania B and Turkey B. He entered in the second half, where he received a goal in the end of the match. When Sorin Frunză was relegated at the satellite, Hăisan was named the captain of the team, but only for a short spell.

His decline started on 7 May 2008, when he received a red card after an altercation with two opponents, and Dušan Kuciak was bought to replace him while he was suspended. Because of Kuciak's incredible form, Hăisan had to accept he was once again the second-choice keeper for his team. In the 2009 winter, he was loaned to FCM Bacău, where he was named the player of the season, even he played only in the second part of it. He returned in the summer in Vaslui, where he managed to finish 3rd with his team, and reach the Romanian Cup final. Unfortunately, same as his father did 17 years ago, he lost it at the penalty shootout.

=== Brașov and Mioveni ===
Hăisan had two brief spells at FC Brașov and CS Mioveni, but not managing to make an impact at both teams.

=== Politehnica Iași ===
In February 2012, the player signed a contract with Liga II side Politehnica Iași.

== Honours ==
=== FC Vaslui ===
- Cupa României
  - Runner-up: 2010
- UEFA Intertoto Cup
  - Winner: 2008

== Statistics ==
Club	Season	Domestic League		Domestic Cups		Continental games		Total
Club	Season	App	C.S.	App	C.S.	App	C.S.	App	C.S.
FC Brașov	10–11	3	1	0	0	0	0	3	1
FC Brașov	Total	3	1	0	0	0	0	3	1
FC Vaslui	10–11	0	0	0	0	0	0	0	0
FC Vaslui	09–10	12	4	2	2	1	0	15	5
FC Vaslui	Total	12	4	2	2	1	0	15	6
FCM Bacău	08–09	12	4	0	0	0	0	12	4
FCM Bacău	Total	12	4	0	0	0	0	12	4
FC Vaslui	08–09	0	0	0	0	0	0	0	0
FC Vaslui	07–08	34	11	0	0	0	0	34	11
FC Vaslui	06–07	29	10	1	1	0	0	30	11
FC Vaslui	05–06	8	3	2	0	0	0	10	3
FC Vaslui	Total	71	24	3	1	0	0	74	25
Altay Constanța	04–05	13	6	0	0	0	0	13	6
Altay Constanța	Total	13	6	0	0	0	0	13	6
FC Vaslui	04–05	1	1	1	1	0	0	2	2
FC Vaslui	03–04	0	0	0	0	0	0	0	0
FC Vaslui	02–03	1	1	0	0	0	0	1	1
FC Vaslui	Total	2	2	1	1	0	0	3	3
Career Totals		113	41	6	4	1	0	120	45
Last updated 10 April 2011
