= Yero Bello =

Nigerian footballer (born 1987)

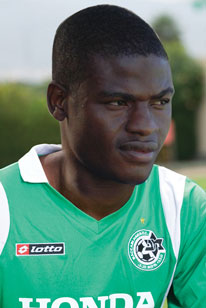
- Bello with Maccabi Haifa

Personal information
- Date of birth: 11 December 1987 (age 38)
- Place of birth: Kaduna, Nigeria
- Height: 1.84 m (6 ft 0 in)
- Positions: Striker; winger

Youth career
- 1997–2005: Rainbow United
- 2005–2006: Maccabi Haifa

Senior career*
Years	Team	Apps	(Gls)
2006–2011	Maccabi Haifa	0	(0)
2006–2007	→ Hapoel Nazareth Illit (loan)	31	(11)
2007–2009	→ Ironi Kiryat Shmona (loan)	42	(13)
2009–2010	→ Hapoel Haifa (loan)	30	(9)
2010–2011	→ Vaslui (loan)	27	(4)
2011–2012	Vaslui	28	(3)
2012–2013	Bnei Sakhnin	24	(7)
2013–2015	Ashdod	59	(12)
2016	Ilves	2	(0)
2016–2017	Milsami Orhei	23	(3)
Total		266	(62)
- * Club domestic league appearances and goals

Yero Bello (born 11 December 1987) is a Nigerian former professional footballer who played as a striker.

== Career ==
On 9 August 2010, Bello signed with the Romanian club FC Vaslui for three years.

== Career statistics ==
Appearances and goals by club, season and competition
Club	Season	League		Cup		Europe		Other		Total	
Club	Season	Apps	Goals	Apps	Goals	Apps	Goals	Apps	Goals	Apps	Goals
SC Vaslui	2010–11	27	4	1	0	1	0	0	0	29	4
SC Vaslui	2011–12	28	3	4	3	8	0	0	0	40	6
SC Vaslui	Total	55	7	5	3	9	0	0	0	69	10
