= Jan Pahor =

Slovenian footballer

Personal information
- Full name: Jan Pahor
- Date of birth: 10 June 1986 (age 40)
- Place of birth: Koper, SFR Yugoslavia
- Height: 1.92 m (6 ft 4 in)
- Position: Central defender

Youth career
- –2005: Koper

Senior career*
Years	Team	Apps	(Gls)
2005–2009	Koper	68	(2)
2007	→ Gorica (loan)	6	(1)
2009	Farul Constanţa	11	(1)
2010	Ivančna Gorica	11	(0)
2010–2011	Nea Salamis Famagusta	20	(0)
2011–2015	Ankaran	84	(19)
2015–2017	Kras Repen	41	(3)
2017–2019	Ankaran	62	(3)

International career
2004	Slovenia U18	1	(0)
2005–2007	Slovenia U20	4	(0)
2006–2007	Slovenia U21	8	(0)
- * Club domestic league appearances and goals as of 14 June 2019

Jan Pahor (born 10 June 1986) is a Slovenian retired footballer who played as a defender.

He began his professional career at the age of 18 with the Slovenian side Koper. With Koper, he won the Slovenian Football Cup in 2006. In January 2009, he joined the Romanian Liga I team Farul Constanţa.
