= Dušan Kuciak =

Slovak footballer (born 1985)

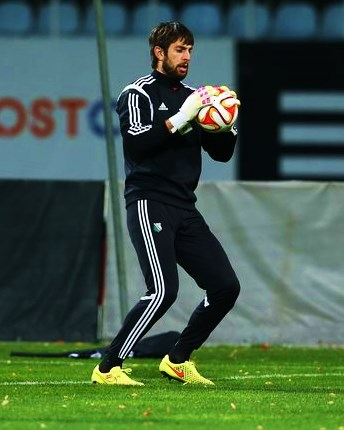
- Kuciak with Legia Warsaw in 2014

Personal information
- Date of birth: 21 May 1985 (age 41)
- Place of birth: Žilina, Czechoslovakia
- Height: 1.94 m (6 ft 4 in)
- Position: Goalkeeper

Team information
- Current team: Stoczniowiec Gdańsk
- Number: 12

Youth career
- Žilina

Senior career*
Years	Team	Apps	(Gls)
2001–2002	AS Trenčín	1	(0)
2002–2008	Žilina	89	(0)
2005	→ West Ham United (loan)	0	(0)
2008–2011	Vaslui	87	(0)
2011–2016	Legia Warsaw	131	(0)
2016–2017	Hull City	0	(0)
2017–2024	Lechia Gdańsk	196	(0)
2024	→ Raków Częstochowa (loan)	1	(0)
2024–2025	Raków Częstochowa	0	(0)
2025–	Stoczniowiec Gdańsk	18	(0)

International career
2006–2021	Slovakia	14	(0)
Signature
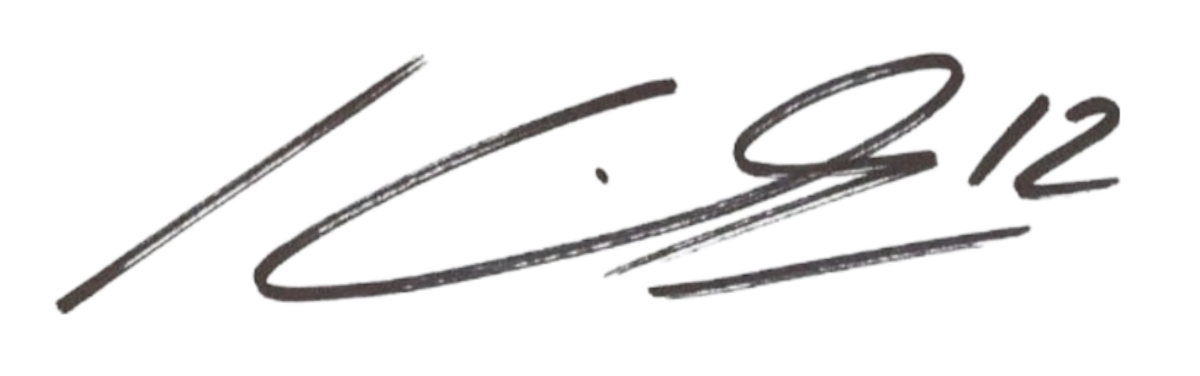
- * Club domestic league appearances and goals as of 22:23, 22 June 2026 (UTC)

Dušan Kuciak (Slovak pronunciation: [ˈduʂaŋ ˈkutsɪɐk]; born 21 May 1985) is a Slovak professional footballer who plays as a goalkeeper for Polish club Stoczniowiec Gdańsk. He is also the goalkeeping coach of IV liga Pomerania club Sokół Bożepole Wielkie. He is the younger brother of Martin Kuciak, who also played as a goalkeeper.

== Club career ==
In February 2005, while under contract with Žilina, Kuciak joined English club West Ham United on loan until the end of the 2005–06 season, although he left without playing for the club.

On 26 June 2008, Kuciak signed a three-year contract with Romanian club FC Vaslui. He joined the Polish club Legia Warsaw in August 2011, later extending his contract in August 2013 until 2016. By November 2011, Kuciak had already put together the fifth-longest ever series of not conceding in the Polish league, not letting in a goal for 735 minutes. In January 2013, West Ham United were reported to be in talks with him. On 24 March 2014, Kuciak made his 100th appearance for Legia Warsaw in a 2–1 victory against Piast Gliwice.

On 1 February 2016, Kuciak signed an 18-month contract with Hull City. He made his debut for the club on 23 August of that year in the second round of EFL Cup away to Exeter City, in a match that City won 3–1. Having made a single appearance for Hull, Kuciak left the club on a free transfer in February 2017, returning to Poland to sign for Lechia Gdańsk.

== International career ==
On 10 December 2006, Kuciak debuted for the Slovak senior squad in a 2–1 away friendly victory against the United Arab Emirates. He was named in the final Slovakia squad for the UEFA Euro 2020 tournament. Kuciak last appeared in the national team selection under Štefan Tarkovič in November 2021.

== Career statistics ==
=== Club ===
As of match played 6 June 2026

Appearances and goals by club, season and competition
Club	Season	League			National cup (Note: Includes Slovak Cup, Cupa României, Polish Cup)		Europe		Other		Total	
Club	Season	Division	Apps	Goals	Apps	Goals	Apps	Goals	Apps	Goals	Apps	Goals
Žilina	2005–06	Slovak Superliga	21	0	0	0	0	0	0	0	21	0
Žilina	2006–07	Slovak Superliga	35	0	3	0	0	0	0	0	38	0
Žilina	2007–08	Slovak Superliga	33	0	5	0	4 (Note: Appearances in UEFA Champions League)	0	1 (Note: Appearance in Slovak Super Cup)	0	43	0
Žilina	Total		89	0	8	0	4	0	1	0	102	0
Vaslui	2008–09	Liga I	34	0	4	0	6 (Note: Four appearances in UEFA Cup, two appearances in UEFA Intertoto Cup)	0	0	0	44	0
Vaslui	2009–10	Liga I	23	0	4	0	3 (Note: Appearances in UEFA Europa League)	0	0	0	30	0
Vaslui	2010–11	Liga I	30	0	1	0	2	0	0	0	33	0
Vaslui	Total		87	0	9	0	11	0	0	0	107	0
Legia Warsaw	2011–12	Ekstraklasa	27	0	3	0	8	0	—		38	0
Legia Warsaw	2012–13	Ekstraklasa	30	0	0	0	6	0	1 (Note: Appearance in Polish Super Cup)	0	37	0
Legia Warsaw	2013–14	Ekstraklasa	25	0	1	0	8 (Note: Six appearances in UEFA Champions League, two appearances in UEFA Europa League)	0	—		34	0
Legia Warsaw	2014–15	Ekstraklasa	31	0	7	0	14 (Note: Four appearances in UEFA Champions League, ten appearances in UEFA Europa League)	0	0	0	52	0
Legia Warsaw	2015–16	Ekstraklasa	18	0	2	0	11	0	1	0	32	0
Legia Warsaw	Total		131	0	13	0	47	0	2	0	193	0
Hull City	2016–17	Premier League	0	0	0	0	0	0	1 (Note: Appearance in EFL Cup)	0	1	0
Lechia Gdańsk	2016–17	Ekstraklasa	17	0	—		—		—		17	0
Lechia Gdańsk	2017–18	Ekstraklasa	36	0	1	0	—		—		37	0
Lechia Gdańsk	2018–19	Ekstraklasa	28	0	2	0	—		—		30	0
Lechia Gdańsk	2019–20	Ekstraklasa	30	0	0	0	2	0	1	0	33	0
Lechia Gdańsk	2020–21	Ekstraklasa	28	0	1	0	—		—		29	0
Lechia Gdańsk	2021–22	Ekstraklasa	27	0	1	0	—		—		28	0
Lechia Gdańsk	2022–23	Ekstraklasa	30	0	1	0	4 (Note: Appearances in UEFA Europa Conference League)	0	—		35	0
Lechia Gdańsk	2023–24	I liga	0	0	0	0	—		—		0	0
Lechia Gdańsk	Total		196	0	6	0	6	0	1	0	209	0
Raków Częstochowa (loan)	2023–24	Ekstraklasa	1	0	—		—		—		1	0
Raków Częstochowa	2024–25	Ekstraklasa	0	0	0	0	—		—		0	0
Raków Częstochowa	Total		1	0	0	0	—		—		1	0
Stoczniowiec Gdańsk	2025–26	Regional league	18	0	—		—		—		18	0
Total			522	0	36	0	68	0	5	0	631	0

=== International ===
Appearances and goals by national team and year
National team	Year	Apps	Goals
Slovakia	2006	1	0
Slovakia	2007	1	0
Slovakia	2010	1	0
Slovakia	2012	4	0
Slovakia	2013	3	0
Slovakia	2020	1	0
Slovakia	2021	3	0
Total		14	0

== Honours ==
MŠK Žilina

- Slovak Superliga: 2006–07
- Slovak Super Cup: 2007

Legia Warsaw

- Ekstraklasa: 2012–13, 2013–14, 2015–16
- Polish Cup: 2011–12, 2014–15, 2015–16

Hull City

- Football League Championship play-offs: 2016

Lechia Gdańsk

- Polish Cup: 2018–19
- Polish Super Cup: 2019

Stoczniowiec Gdańsk

- Regional league Gdańsk I: 2025–26

Individual

- Ekstraklasa Goalkeeper of the Season: 2013–14, 2019–20
- Piłka Nożna Foreigner of the Year: 2013
