= Nemanja Jovanović =

Serbian footballer

Personal information
- Date of birth: 3 March 1984 (age 42)
- Place of birth: Negotin, SFR Yugoslavia
- Height: 1.91 m (6 ft 3 in)
- Position: Striker

Senior career*
Years	Team	Apps	(Gls)
2000–2003	Red Star Belgrade	0	(0)
2001–2002	→ Železnik (loan)	0	(0)
2002–2003	→ Big Bull Bačinci (loan)	14	(0)
2003–2007	Unirea Urziceni	47	(7)
2004	→ Argeș Pitești (loan)	4	(1)
2006	→ Pandurii Târgu Jiu (loan)	4	(0)
2007	→ CSM Râmnicu Vâlcea (loan)	16	(4)
2007–2008	Universitatea Cluj	29	(6)
2008–2010	FC Vaslui	30	(4)
2010	→ Unirea Alba Iulia (loan)	16	(2)
2011	Taraz	29	(7)
2012	Kairat	14	(2)
2012	Tobol	9	(2)
2013	Sandnes Ulf	9	(0)
2014	Spartak Semey	30	(7)
2015	Olmaliq	28	(9)
2016	Andijan	13	(5)
2016	Qizilqum Zarafshon	16	(8)
2017	Navbahor Namangan	29	(7)
2018	Qizilqum Zarafshon	28	(6)
Total		364	(77)
- * Club domestic league appearances and goals as of 17 October 2019

Nemanja Jovanović (Serbian Cyrillic: Немања Јовановић; born on 3 March 1984) is a Serbian former football striker.

== Career statistics ==
As of 17 October 2019

Season	Club	League		Cup		Continental		Total	
Season	Club	Apps	Goals	Apps	Goals	Apps	Goals	Apps	Goals
2002–03	Big Bull Bačinci	14	0	0	0	—		14	0
2003–04	Unirea Urziceni	6	0	0	0	—		6	0
2003–04	Argeș Pitești	4	1	2	0	—		6	1
2004–05	Unirea Urziceni	27	7	1	0	—		28	7
2005–06	Unirea Urziceni	14	0	0	0	—		14	0
2006–07	Pandurii Târgu Jiu	4	0	0	0	—		4	0
2006–07	CSM Râmnicu Vâlcea	16	4	0	0	—		16	4
2007–08	Universitatea Cluj	29	6	1	2	—		30	8
2008–09	FC Vaslui	17	1	3	1	5 (Note: One appearance in the UEFA Intertoto Cup and four in the UEFA Cup)	0	25	2
2009–10	FC Vaslui	13	3	3	0	4 (Note: Appearances in the UEFA Europa League)	0	20	3
2009–10	Unirea Alba Iulia	16	2	0	0	—		16	2
2011	Taraz	29	7	4	3	—		33	10
2012	Kairat	14	2	1	0	—		15	2
2012	Tobol	9	2	2	1	—		11	3
2013	Sandnes Ulf	9	0	0	0	—		9	0
2014	Spartak Semey	30	7	0	0	—		30	7
2015	Olmaliq	25	9	0	0	—		28	9
2016	Andijan	13	5	2	1	—		15	6
2016	Qizilqum Zarafshon	16	8	0	0	—		16	8
2017	Navbahor Namangan	29	7	2	1	—		31	8
2018	Qizilqum Zarafshon	28	6	2	0	—		30	6
Career Total		364	77	23	9	9	0	396	86

== Honours ==
Vaslui

- UEFA Intertoto Cup (1): 2008
