= Hugo Luz =

Portuguese footballer

Personal information
- Full name: Hugo Duarte de Sousa Luz
- Date of birth: 24 February 1982 (age 44)
- Place of birth: Faro, Portugal
- Height: 1.75 m (5 ft 9 in)
- Position: Left-back

Youth career
- 1990–1998: Farense
- 1998–2001: Porto

Senior career*
Years	Team	Apps	(Gls)
2000–2003	Porto B	73	(0)
2003–2004	Porto	2	(0)
2003–2004	→ Gil Vicente (loan)	11	(0)
2004–2005	Estrela Amadora	19	(0)
2005–2006	Maia	19	(1)
2006–2008	Olhanense	46	(0)
2008–2012	Vaslui	70	(2)
2012–2015	Farense	98	(0)
2016–2017	Armacenenses	25	(1)
Total		363	(4)

International career
1999	Portugal U16	8	(0)
2000	Portugal U17	3	(0)
2001	Portugal U18	4	(0)
2002	Portugal U20	6	(0)
2003	Portugal U21	3	(0)
- * Club domestic league appearances and goals

Hugo Duarte de Sousa Luz (born 24 February 1982 in Faro, Algarve) is a Portuguese former professional footballer who played as a left-back.

== Honours ==
Porto

- Primeira Liga: 2002–03

Vaslui

- UEFA Intertoto Cup: 2008
- Cupa României runner-up: 2009–10

Farense

- Segunda Divisão: 2012–13
