= Miloš Pavlović (footballer) =

Serbian footballer

Personal information
- Date of birth: 27 November 1983 (age 42)
- Place of birth: Belgrade, SFR Yugoslavia
- Height: 1.91 m (6 ft 3 in)
- Position: Defensive midfielder

Senior career*
Years	Team	Apps	(Gls)
2001–2005	Radnički Beograd	63	(4)
2005–2006	Voždovac	27	(3)
2006–2009	Académica	40	(2)
2009–2011	Vaslui	66	(2)
2012	Rapid București	17	(0)
2013–2014	Doxa Katokopia	28	(0)
2014–2019	Voždovac	135	(5)
2019–2021	Zemun	28	(1)

International career
2006	Serbia and Montenegro U21	1	(0)
- * Club domestic league appearances and goals

Miloš Pavlović (Serbian Cyrillic: Милош Павловић; born 27 November 1983) is a Serbian retired professional footballer who played as a defensive midfielder.

== Club career ==
Pavlović started at Radnički Beograd, before switching to Voždovac in the 2005 summer transfer window. He subsequently moved abroad to Portugal and signed with Académica in August 2006. In January 2009, Pavlović was transferred to Romanian club Vaslui.

In the summer of 2014, Pavlović returned to his homeland and joined his former club Voždovac.

== International career ==
Pavlović represented Serbia and Montenegro at under-21 level in 2006. He was part of the team at the 2006 UEFA European Under-21 Championship.

== Career statistics ==
As of 19 May 2019

Appearances and goals by club, season and competition
Club	Season	League		Cup		Continental		Total	
Club	Season	Apps	Goals	Apps	Goals	Apps	Goals	Apps	Goals
Voždovac	2014–15	23	1	5	0	—		28	1
Voždovac	2015–16	31	0	1	0	—		32	0
Voždovac	2016–17	27	1	2	0	—		29	1
Voždovac	2017–18	23	2	1	0	—		24	2
Voždovac	2018–19	31	1	0	0	—		31	1
Voždovac	Total	135	5	9	0	—		144	5

== Honours ==
Vaslui

- Cupa României: Runner-up 2009–10
