= Lucian Burdujan =

Romanian footballer

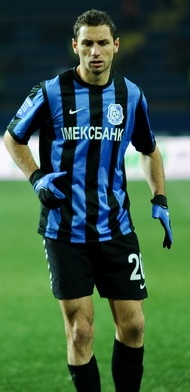

Personal information
- Date of birth: 18 February 1984 (age 42)
- Place of birth: Piatra Neamț, Romania
- Height: 1.81 m (5 ft 11 in)
- Positions: Winger; striker

Youth career
- Ceahlăul Piatra Neamț

Senior career*
Years	Team	Apps	(Gls)
2002–2004	Ceahlăul Piatra Neamț	43	(8)
2004–2008	Rapid București	69	(18)
2008–2011	FC Vaslui	54	(10)
2011	FCSB	5	(1)
2011–2013	Chornomorets Odesa	43	(9)
2013–2014	Tavriya Simferopol	7	(1)
2014	Hoverla Uzhhorod	6	(0)
2014–2015	Hatta		
2015–2016	Europa F.C.		
2016–2017	AEL Kalloni	6	(1)
2017	Aiginiakos	14	(2)
Total		247+	(50+)

International career
2003–2005	Romania U21	13	(1)
- * Club domestic league appearances and goals

Lucian Burdujan (born 18 February 1984) is a Romanian former professional footballer who played as a winger and striker.

== Career ==
Burdujan was born in Piatra Neamț. He started his career at Ceahlăul Piatra Neamț in 2002. In 2004, he transferred to FC Rapid București but failed to play regularly in the first eleven. His best spell at Rapid was during the first season, when he managed to score eight goals. He was injured for most of the 2006–07 season.

In the summer of 2008, Burdujan left Rapid for SC Vaslui in exchange for Ștefan Mardare. He scored his first goal for Vaslui against Neftchi Baku in the UEFA Intertoto Cup. At the end of the 2008–09 season, he was Vaslui's top scorer in all competitions, with eleven goals, tied with Mike Temwanjera.

On 5 April 2011, now playing for Steaua București, Burdujan scored the first and fifth goals in Steaua's 5–0 home victory over Unirea Urziceni.

Burdujan left Steaua, signing a two-and-a-half-year contract with Ukrainian team Chornomorets on 24 June 2011.

On 18 September 2014, it was announced Burdujan had joined Hoverla Uzhhorod from Tavriya Simferopol.

== Career statistics ==
Appearances and goals by club, season and competition
Club	Season	League		Cup		Continental		Other		Total	
Club	Season	Apps	Goals	Apps	Goals	Apps	Goals	Apps	Goals	Apps	Goals
Ceahlăul Piatra Neamț	2002–03	19	1	0	0	0	0	0	0	19	1
Ceahlăul Piatra Neamț	2003–04	24	7	0	0	0	0	0	0	24	7
Ceahlăul Piatra Neamț	Total	43	8	0	0	0	0	0	0	43	8
Rapid București	2004–05	22	8	0	0	0	0	0	0	22	8
Rapid București	2005–06	17	3	3	1	11	1	1	0	32	5
Rapid București	2006–07	7	1	1	0	4	1	1	1	13	3
Rapid București	2007–08	23	6	1	1	2	0	0	0	28	7
Rapid București	Total	69	18	5	2	17	2	2	1	93	23
Vaslui	2008–09	28	6	3	2	5	3	0	0	36	11
Vaslui	2009–10	18	2	3	2	2	0	0	0	23	4
Vaslui	2010–11	8	2	1	0	0	0	0	0	9	2
Vaslui	Total	54	10	7	4	7	3	0	0	68	17
Steaua București	2010–11	5	1	0	0	0	0	0	0	5	1
Chornomorets Odesa	2011–12	20	4	2	0	0	0	0	0	22	4
Chornomorets Odesa	2012–13	23	5	5	2	0	0	0	0	28	7
Chornomorets Odesa	Total	43	9	7	2	0	0	0	0	50	11
Career total		214	46	19	8	24	5	2	1	259	60

== Honours ==
Rapid București

- Cupa României: 2006, 2007
- Liga I runner-up: 2006
- Supercupa României runner-up: 2006, 2007

Vaslui

- Cupa României runner-up: 2010
- UEFA Intertoto Cup: 2008

Hatta

- UAE Division One: 2015–16

Europa FC

- Gibraltar Premier Division runner-up: 2016
