= Gabriel Cânu =

Romanian footballer (born 1981)

Personal information
- Date of birth: 18 January 1981 (age 45)
- Place of birth: Bucharest, Romania
- Height: 1.86 m (6 ft 1 in)
- Position: Centre back

Team information
- Current team: Voluntari (assistant)

Youth career
- –1999: Național București

Senior career*
Years	Team	Apps	(Gls)
1999–2004	Național București	23	(0)
2000–2001	→ Cimentul Fieni (loan)	31	(1)
2001–2002	→ FC Baia Mare (loan)	26	(1)
2005–2008	Politehnica Timișoara	73	(6)
2008–2013	Vaslui	49	(6)
2013–2014	Ceahlăul Piatra Neamț	26	(2)
2014–2018	ACS Poli Timișoara	96	(7)
Total		324	(23)

Managerial career
- 2018–2019: Hermannstadt (assistant)
- 2021–2023: Metaloglobus București (assistant)
- 2025–: Voluntari (assistant)
- * Club domestic league appearances and goals

Gabriel Cânu (born 18 January 1981) is a Romanian former professional footballer, currently assistant coach of Liga I club Voluntari.

== Career ==
Born in Bucharest, Cânu came through the youth ranks of local Național București, going on to finish his sporting formation with the Divizia B teams Cimentul Fieni and FC Baia Mare.

=== Național ===
Aged 18, he made his debut in Național's first team on 2 June 1999, coming as a substitute in a 2–0 win against Petrolul Ploiești. It was his only appearance that season. After one season, with no matches, he was loaned two consecutive seasons to Divizia B sides Cimentul Fieni and FC Baia Mare, to build up his first team experience. After he returned, he failed to establish himself in the first team squad.

Cânu made one appearance in the Romanian first league in 1997/1998, while at FC Național. In the 2000/2001 and 2001/2002 seasons he played in the Romanian second league, for Cimentul Fieni and FC Baia Mare respectively. He then returned to FC Național, playing 16 times in the Divizia A during the 2003/2004 season. Cânu joined Poli in the winter break of the 2004/2005 season, together with Național coach Cosmin Olăroiu and teammates Gabriel Caramarin, Gigel Coman and Marius Popa.

== Honours ==
Național București

- Cupa României runner-up: 2002–03

Vaslui

- Cupa României runner-up: 2009–10
- UEFA Intertoto Cup: 2008

ACS Poli Timișoara

- Liga II: 2014–15
- Cupa Ligii runner-up: 2016–17
