= Marius Ștefoi =

Romanian footballer

Marius Ştefoi
Personal information
- Full name: Marius Cornel Ştefoi
- Date of birth: 23 April 1990 (age 36)
- Place of birth: Bistriţa, Romania
- Height: 1.80 m (5 ft 11 in)
- Position: Midfielder

Team information
- Current team: SC NicMar-Danci

Senior career*
Years	Team	Apps	(Gls)
2007–2009	Botoşani	37	(4)
2009–2012	Vaslui	3	(0)
2010	→ Voinţa Livezile (loan)	15	(2)
2010	→ Zalău (loan)	14	(2)
2011–2012	→ Farul (loan)	1	(0)
2012	Ahlerstedt/Ottendorf	4	(2)
2012	Vointa Cetate	3	(0)
2013	Bistrița		
2013–	NicMar-Danci		

International career
2008–2009	Romania U19	5	(1)
- * Club domestic league appearances and goals

Marius Ştefoi (born 23 April 1990) is a Romanian footballer, who plays for SC NicMar-Danci.

== Career ==
The right midfielder played 26 matches for FC Botoșani and 3 matches for FC Vaslui in the Liga I.

=== International ===
Ștefoi was from 2008 to 2009 member of the Romania national under-19 football team and played his debut on 15 December 2008 against Italy national under-19 football team.

Club	Season	Domestic League		Domestic Cups		Continental games		Total
Club	Season	App	Goals	App	Goals	App	Goals	App	Goals
SC Vaslui	09–10	0	0	0	0	0	0	0	0
SC Vaslui	08–09	3	0	0	0	0	0	3	0
SC Vaslui	Total	3	0	0	0	0	0	3	0
FC Botoşani	08–09	11	2	1	0	0	0	12	2
FC Botoşani	07–08	26	2	0	0	0	0	26	2
FC Botoşani	Total	37	4	1	0	0	0	38	4
Career Totals		40	4	1	0	0	0	41	4
Last updated 11 September 2009
