= Neven Marković =

Serbian retired footballer (born 1987)

Personal information
- Full name: Neven Marković
- Date of birth: 20 February 1987 (age 39)
- Place of birth: Čapljina, SFR Yugoslavia
- Height: 1.83 m (6 ft 0 in)
- Position: Left-back

Senior career*
Years	Team	Apps	(Gls)
2005–2008	Rad	5	(0)
2007–2008	→ Mladost Lučani (loan)	10	(0)
2008–2010	Vaslui	12	(0)
2010	Kerkyra	2	(0)
2011	Zagreb	10	(0)
2011–2012	Doxa Drama	0	(0)
2012	Sporting Kansas City	2	(0)
2013–2015	Servette FC	39	(3)
2015–2016	Lechia Gdańsk	5	(0)
2015–2016	Lechia Gdańsk II	7	(1)
- * Club domestic league appearances and goals

Neven Marković (Serbian Cyrillic: Невен Марковић; born 20 February 1987) is a Serbian former professional footballer who played as a left-back.

== Club career ==
Born in Čapljina, SR Bosnia and Herzegovina, SFR Yugoslavia, Marković grew up in Belgrade, and he formerly played for FK Rad and FK Mladost Lučani in the Serbian SuperLiga. He was bought by FC Vaslui at the beginning of the 2008–09 season for €250,000. At first Vaslui, bought him as a substitute, but in the first half of the season, due to injuries, he began to see more regular action.

On 6 July 2012, Marković signed a contract with Sporting Kansas City of Major League Soccer.

Marković was released by Kansas City on November 19, 2012.

Marković last played for Lechia Gdańsk from Poland.

== Honors ==
Vaslui

- UEFA Intertoto Cup: 2008

Sporting Kansas City

- Lamar Hunt U.S. Open Cup: 2012
