= 2009–10 Cupa României =

Tournament details
- Country: Romania
- Teams: 98

Final positions
- Champions: CFR Cluj
- Runners-up: Vaslui

The 2009–10 Cupa României was the seventy-second season of the annual Romanian football knockout tournament. It began on 15 July 2009 with the matches of Phase 1 and ended with the Final on 6 June 2010. CFR Cluj were the defending champions.

The winners of the competition qualified for the play-off round of the 2010–11 Europa League.

== Round of 32 ==
The 14 winners of Phase V entered in this round and were joined by 18 teams from the 2009–10 Liga I season. The matches were played on 22–24 September 2009. frf.ro reference

Team 1	Score	Team 2
FCM Bacău	0–2	Steaua București
Unirea Urziceni	3–0	Sportul Studențesc București
Chimia Brazi	0–5	FC Vaslui
Dunărea Galaţi	0–2	CFR Cluj
Politehnica Timișoara	7–0	Sănătatea Cluj
CS Zlatna	0–5	Dinamo București
Ceahlăul Piatra Neamţ	1–1 (a.e.t.) (2–3 p)	Gaz Metan CFR Craiova
Gaz Metan Mediaş	1–1 (a.e.t.) (5–4 p)	CSM Râmnicu Vâlcea
FC Brașov	4–0 (a.e.t.)	CS Otopeni
Astra Ploieşti	2–1 (a.e.t.)	Farul Constanţa
Gloria Bistriţa	3–0	Dunărea Giurgiu
Minerul Valea Copcii	1–1 (a.e.t.) (3–5 p)	Internaţional Curtea de Argeş
Bihor Oradea	0–2	Rapid București
FC U Craiova	4–0	Gloria II Bistriţa
Oţelul Galaţi	1–1 (a.e.t.) (4–3 p)	Unirea Alba Iulia
Politehnica Iaşi	3–1	Pandurii Târgu Jiu

== Round of 16 ==
The 16 winners from the previous round competed in this round. The matches were played on 27, 28 and 29 October 2009. frf.ro reference

Team 1	Score	Team 2
Gaz Metan CFR Craiova	0–1	CFR Cluj
Astra Ploieşti	2–2 (a.e.t.) (6–5 p)	Politehnica Timișoara
Dinamo București	1–0	Oţelul Galaţi
Gaz Metan Mediaş	0–1	FC Vaslui
Unirea Urziceni	0–1	FC Brașov
Gloria Bistriţa	0–0 (a.e.t.) (5–4 p)	Steaua București
Politehnica Iaşi	0–3	FC U Craiova
Internaţional Curtea de Argeş	2–1	Rapid București

== Quarter-finals ==
Eight winners from the previous round competed in this round. The matches were played on 17, 18 and 19 November 2009 in a one leg tie. http://www.frfotbal.ro/index.php?competition_id=8&season=46&serie_id=285&etapa_id=2709

17 November 2009	FC Brașov	3–0	Gloria Bistriţa	Braşov
19:00 EET	Hadnagy 4'; Zaharia 30'; Roman (yellow card) 39'; Abrudan (yellow card) 52'; Ilyeş 60', (yellow card) 67'	Report	Ciucă (yellow card) 62'; Iodi (yellow card) 77'	Stadium: Stadionul Tineretului; Attendance: 4,000; Referee: Marius Avram

18 November 2009	FC Vaslui	1–0	Internaţional Curtea de Argeş	Vaslui
18:15 EET	Farkaš (yellow card) 70'; Burdujan 87'	Report	Matei (yellow card) 31', (yellow card) 43' (red card); Neagu (yellow card) 40'; Arčaba (yellow card) 64'; Voiculeţ (yellow card) 68'	Stadium: Stadionul Municipal; Attendance: 2,000; Referee: Ovidiu Haţegan

18 November 2009	FC U Craiova	0–1	CFR Cluj	Craiova
20:15 EET	Bădoi (yellow card) 57'	Report	Dubarbier 24', (yellow card) 61'; Traoré (red card) 31'; Panin (yellow card) 65'; Culio (yellow card) 73'; Tony (yellow card) 75'	Stadium: Ion Oblemenco; Attendance: 12,000; Referee: Alexandru Tudor

19 November 2009	Astra Ploieşti	1–2	Dinamo București	Ploieşti
20:15 EET	Păun 16' (pen.); Strătilă (red card) 68'	Report	An. Cristea 10', 54'; N'Doye (yellow card) 38'; Molinero (yellow card) 45'; Moţi (red card) 65'; Rus (yellow card) 83'	Stadium: Stadionul Astra; Attendance: 6,000; Referee: Cristian Balaj

== Semi-finals ==
The semifinals were played in two legs. The first leg was played on 24 and 25 March 2010 while the second leg on 14 and 15 April 2010. http://www.frfotbal.ro/index.php?competition_id=8&season=46&serie_id=285&etapa_id=3224

Team 1	Agg.	Team 2	1st leg	2nd leg
Dinamo București	2–3	CFR Cluj	1–1	1–2
FC Brașov	1–4	FC Vaslui	1–0	0–4

=== First leg ===
24 March 2010	Dinamo București	1–1	CFR Cluj	Bucharest
20:15 EET	Goian 14'; D. Koné (yellow card) 88', (yellow card) 90' (red card)	Report	Y. Koné 25'; Culio (yellow card) 50'; Mureşan (yellow card) 63'; N. Dică (yellow card) 88'	Stadium: Stadionul Dinamo; Attendance: 10,000; Referee: Ovidiu Haţegan

25 March 2010	FC Brașov	1–0	FC Vaslui	Braşov
20:15 EET	Ilyeş 5', (yellow card) 66'; Grigore (yellow card) 40'; Nuno Diogo (yellow card) 59'; Măldărăşanu (yellow card) 70'; Rui Duarte (yellow card) 87'; Coman (yellow card) 90'	Report	L. Sânmărtean (yellow card) 19'; Delgado (yellow card) 58'; Milanov (yellow card) 82'	Stadium: Stadionul Tineretului; Attendance: 5,000; Referee: Marius Avram

=== Second leg ===
14 April 2010	CFR Cluj	2–1 (3–2 agg.)	Dinamo București	Cluj-Napoca
20:15 EEST	Edimar (red card) 46'; N. Dică 51'; Traoré 77'; Culio (yellow card) 58'	Report	An. Cristea (yellow card) 60'; An. Cristea 72'; Niculescu (yellow card) 86'	Stadium: Stadionul Dr. Constantin Rădulescu; Attendance: 12,800; Referee: Alexandru Tudor

15 April 2010	FC Vaslui	4–0 (4–1 agg.)	FC Brașov	Vaslui
20:15 EEST	Costin 28'; Wesley 29'; L. Sânmărtean 53'; Pavlović (yellow card) 59'; Costly 73'; Papp (yellow card) 74'	Report	Zaharia (yellow card) 26'; Ionescu (yellow card) 39'; Nuno Diogo (yellow card) 45'; Abrudan (red card) 56'	Stadium: Stadionul Municipal; Attendance: 7,000; Referee: Marius Avram

== Final ==
26 May 2010
21:00 EEST

FC Vaslui	0–0	CFR Cluj
	Report
Penalties
Milisavljević (penalty missed); Zmeu (penalty scored); Costin (penalty scored); Burdujan (penalty scored); Wesley (penalty scored)	4–5	(penalty scored) Mureşan; (penalty scored) N. Dică; (penalty scored) Deac; (penalty scored) Bud; (penalty scored) Cadú

Stadionul Emil Alexandrescu, Iaşi
Attendance: 11,000
Referee: Alexandru Deaconu
