= 2006–07 FC Vaslui season =

FC Vaslui
2006–07 season
- Owner: (Romania) Adrian Porumboiu
- President: (Romania) Ciprian Damian
- Manager: (Romania) Gheorghe Mulţescu (Resigned on Sep 24, 2006); Viorel Hizo (From Sep 24, 2006)
- Stadium: Municipal
- Liga I: 8th
- Cupa României: Sixteen-finals, eliminated
- Top goalscorer: League: (Moldova) Viorel Frunză (10); All: (Moldova) Viorel Frunză (10)
- Highest home attendance: 9,000 vs FC Steaua București (3 March 2007)
- Lowest home attendance: 1,800 vs Jiul Petroşani (19 May 2007)

The 2006–07 season was FC Vaslui's 5th season of its existence, and its second in a row in Liga I. With only 8 players from the previous season, FC Vaslui started the season with a new coach, and without a sponsor. A few players from the relegated FCM Bacău, were signed, with also a few foreign players. The new coach was Gheorghe Mulţescu. The team started very bad, and it seemed the previous season, will repeat. However, after a 1–1 draw with Poli Iasi, Mulţescu was sacked and the new coach was named Viorel Hizo. Also, in the same time, Adrian Porumboiu revealed, that he did not leave FC Vaslui, and he was sponsoring it in secret. Hizo made one of the strongest team, in that moment, taking the team, from 17th place, to 7th place in the end of the first half of the season. But because the most important two players left the team, in the winter break Marius Croitoru and Viorel Frunză, the team did not play as same as the end of the first half of the season. FC Vaslui finished 8th in the league table. Adrian Porumboiu wanted Hizo to be the team manager in the next season, but because of the team's poor infrastructure, he decided to leave FC Vaslui, for Ceahlaul.

== First-team squad ==
No.	Name	Age	Nat.	Since	T. Apps.	L. Apps.	C. Apps.	I. Apps.	T. Goals	L. Goals	C. Goals	I. Goals	Ends	Transfer fee	Notes
Goalkeepers
1	Mihai Luca	18	(Romania)	2007 (W)	0	0	0	0	0	0	0	0	N/A	Undisclosed	
22	Claudiu Puia	19	(Romania)	2006	0	0	0	0	0	0	0	0	N/A	Undisclosed	
81	Cristian Hăisan	25	(Romania)	2002	43	39	4	0	0	0	0	0	N/A	Undisclosed	
Defenders
3	Dorian Andronic	16	(Romania)	2007 (W)	5	5	0	0	0	0	0	0	N/A	Undisclosed	
4	Bogdan Panait	23	(Romania)	2007 (W)	89	87	2	0	8	8	0	0	N/A	Free	
5	Ştefan Mardare	18	(Romania)	2006	19	18	1	0	0	0	0	0	N/A	Undisclosed	
6	Laurențiu Ivan	26	(Romania)	2006	24	23	1	0	1	1	0	0	N/A	Undisclosed	
15	Bogdan Buhuş	26	(Romania)	2005	58	55	3	0	0	0	0	0	N/A	Free	
21	Bogdan Cotolan	24	(Romania)	2007 (W)	3	3	0	0	0	0	0	0	N/A	Free	
24	Ştefan Apostol	31	(Romania)	2006	32	31	1	0	0	0	0	0	N/A	Undisclosed	
25	Şerban Moraru	20	(Romania)	2007 (W)	11	11	0	0	0	0	0	0	N/A	Undisclosed	
Midfielders
7	Marius Doboş	25	(Romania)	2006	28	27	1	0	0	0	0	0	N/A	Undisclosed	
8	Denis Zmeu	21	(Moldova)	2007 (W)	15	15	0	0	0	0	0	0	N/A	€0.2M	
11	Adrian Gheorghiu	24	(Romania)	2006	31	30	1	0	7	7	0	0	N/A	Undisclosed	
14	Ionuţ Pavel	19	(Romania)	2007 (W)	1	1	0	0	0	0	0	0	N/A	Undisclosed	
16	Daniel Sabou	27	(Romania)	2006	22	22	0	0	2	2	0	0	N/A	Undisclosed	
18	Vasile Buhăescu	18	(Romania)	2005	43	41	2	0	2	2	0	0	N/A	Youth	
20	Marko Ljubinković	24	(Serbia)	2006	28	28	0	0	2	2	0	0	N/A	€0.05M	
22	Horaţiu Popa	23	(Romania)	2006	34	33	1	0	2	1	1	0	N/A	Undisclosed	
23	Cornel Cornea	24	(Romania)	2006 (W)	21	20	1	0	0	0	0	0	N/A	Undisclosed	
Forwards
9	Răzvan Neagu	19	(Romania)	2006	22	22	0	0	2	0	0	0	N/A	Undisclosed	
17	Ionuţ Balaur	17	(Romania)	2007 (W)	1	1	0	0	0	0	0	0	N/A	Youth	
19	Mike Temwanjera	23	(Zimbabwe)	2007 (W)	15	15	0	0	3	3	0	0	N/A	Undisclosed	
26	Milorad Bukvić	30	(Serbia)	2006 (W)	42	41	1	0	4	4	0	0	N/A	Free	

== Statistics ==
=== Appearances and goals ===
Last updated on 23 May 2007.

No.	Pos	Nat	Player	Total		Liga I		Cupa României	
No.	Pos	Nat	Player	Apps	Goals	Apps	Goals	Apps	Goals
1	GK	(Romania) ROU	Mihai Luca	0	0	0	0	0	0
3	DF	(Romania) ROU	Dorian Andronic	5	0	4+1	0	0	0
4	DF	(Romania) ROU	Bogdan Panait	13	3	13	3	0	0
5	DF	(Romania) ROU	Ştefan Mardare	19	0	13+5	0	1	0
6	DF	(Romania) ROU	Laurențiu Ivan	24	1	23	1	1	0
7	MF	(Romania) ROU	Marius Doboş	28	0	9+18	0	0+1	0
8	MF	(Moldova) MDA	Denis Zmeu	15	0	12+3	0	0	0
9	FW	(Romania) ROU	Răzvan Neagu	22	2	12+10	2	0	0
11	MF	(Romania) ROU	Adrian Gheorghiu	31	7	29+1	7	0+1	0
12	GK	(Romania) ROU	Claudiu Puia	0	0	0	0	0	0
14	MF	(Romania) ROU	Ionuţ Pavel	1	0	0+1	0	0	0
15	DF	(Romania) ROU	Bogdan Buhuş	30	0	29	0	1	0
16	MF	(Romania) ROU	Daniel Sabou	22	2	21+1	2	0	0
17	FW	(Romania) ROU	Ionuţ Balaur	1	0	0+1	0	0	0
18	MF	(Romania) ROU	Vasile Buhăescu	27	2	8+18	2	0+1	0
19	FW	(Zimbabwe) ZIM	Mike Temwanjera	15	3	15	3	0	0
20	MF	(Serbia) SRB	Marko Ljubinković	28	2	23+5	2	0	0
21	DF	(Romania) ROU	Bogdan Cotolan	3	0	3	0	0	0
22	MF	(Romania) ROU	Horaţiu Popa	10	0	10	0	0	0
23	MF	(Romania) ROU	Cornel Cornea	12	0	11	0	1	0
24	DF	(Romania) ROU	Ştefan Apostol	32	0	31	0	1	0
25	DF	(Romania) ROU	Şerban Moraru	11	0	8+3	0	0	0
26	FW	(Serbia) SRB	Milorad Bukvić	27	2	15+11	2	1	0
81	GK	(Romania) ROU	Cristian Hăisan	30	-32	29	-32	1	0
Players sold or loaned out during the season
1	GK	(Slovakia) SVK	Ján Zolna	4	-11	4	-11	0	0
3	DF	(Romania) ROU	Ion Voicu	7	0	2+5	0	0	0
4	FW	(Moldova) MDA	Viorel Frunză	18	10	13+4	10	1	0
8	MF	(Romania) ROU	Marius Croitoru	19	4	17+1	4	1	0
10	MF	(Romania) ROU	Sorin Frunză	2	0	0+2	0	0	0
12	GK	(Portugal) POR	Sérgio Leite	1	-1	1	-1	0	0
14	DF	(Israel) ISR	Kobi Nachtailer	8	0	7+1	0	0	0
17	MF	(Romania) ROU	Aleksandar Madžar	10	1	6+3	1	1	0
19	DF	(Portugal) POR	Nuno Gomes	2	0	2	0	0	0
21	FW	(Romania) ROU	Marian Alexandru	5	0	0+5	0	0	0
27	MF	(Serbia) SRB	Petar Jovanović	6	0	2+3	0	1	0

=== Top scorers ===
Position	Nation	Number	Name	Liga I	Romanian Cup	Total
1	(Moldova)	4	Viorel Frunză	10	0	10
2	(Romania)	11	Adrian Gheorghiu	7	0	7
3	(Romania)	8	Marius Croitoru	4	0	4
4	(Romania)	4	Bogdan Panait	3	0	3
=	(Zimbabwe)	19	Mike Temwanjera	3	0	3
6	(Romania)	18	Vasile Buhăescu	2	0	2
=	(Serbia)	26	Milorad Bukvić	2	0	2
=	(Serbia)	20	Marko Ljubinković	2	0	2
=	(Romania)	16	Daniel Sabou	2	0	2
=	(Romania)	9	Răzvan Neagu	2	0	2
11	(Romania)	6	Laurențiu Ivan	1	0	1
=	(Serbia)	17	Aleksandar Madžar	1	0	1
/	/	/	Own Goals	2	0	2
			TOTALS	41	0	41

=== Disciplinary record ===
Position	Nation	Number	Name	Liga I		Romanian Cup		Total	
Position	Nation	Number	Name	Booked	Sent off (straight red)	Booked	Sent off (straight red)	Booked	Sent off (straight red)
DF	(Romania)	3	Dorian Andronic	1	0	0	0	1	0
DF	(Romania)	3	Ion Voicu	2	0	0	0	2	0
FW	(Moldova)	4	Viorel Frunză	3	0	0	0	3	0
DF	(Romania)	4	Bogdan Panait	3	1	0	0	3	1
DF	(Romania)	5	Ştefan Mardare	4	1	0	0	4	1
DF	(Romania)	6	Laurențiu Ivan	3	1	0	0	3	1
MF	(Romania)	7	Marius Doboş	4	0	0	0	4	0
MF	(Romania)	8	Marius Croitoru	3	0	0	0	3	0
MF	(Moldova)	8	Denis Zmeu	3	0	0	0	3	0
FW	(Romania)	9	Răzvan Neagu	6	0	0	0	6	0
MF	(Romania)	11	Adrian Gheorghiu	5	0	0	0	5	0
GK	(Portugal)	12	Sérgio Leite	1	0	0	0	1	0
DF	(Romania)	15	Bogdan Buhuş	7	0	0	0	7	0
MF	(Romania)	16	Daniel Sabou	3	0	0	0	3	0
MF	(Romania)	18	Vasile Buhăescu	2	0	0	0	2	0
FW	(Zimbabwe)	19	Mike Temwanjera	1	0	0	0	1	0
MF	(Serbia)	20	Marko Ljubinković	4	0	0	0	4	0
DF	(Romania)	21	Bogdan Cotolan	1	0	0	0	1	0
MF	(Romania)	22	Horaţiu Popa	1	0	0	0	1	0
MF	(Romania)	23	Cornel Cornea	3	1	0	0	3	1
DF	(Romania)	24	Ştefan Apostol	8	0	0	0	8	0
DF	(Romania)	25	Şerban Moraru	1	1	0	0	1	1
FW	(Serbia)	26	Milorad Bukvić	4	0	0	0	4	0
GK	(Romania)	81	Cristian Hăisan	3	0	0	0	3	0
FW	(Romania)	TBD	Marian Alexandru	1	0	0	0	1	0
MF	(Serbia)	TBD	Aleksandar Madžar	2	0	0	0	2	0
			TOTALS	79	5	0	0	79	5

=== Overall ===
Games played	35 (34 Liga I, 1 Cupa României)
Games won	13 (13 Liga I)
Games drawn	12 (11 Liga I, 1 Cupa României)
Games lost	10 (10 Liga I)
Goals scored	41
Goals conceded	44
Goal difference	–3
Yellow cards	79
Red cards	5
Worst discipline	(Romania) Ştefan Apostol with 8 yellow cards
Best result	3–1 (H) v Oţelul Galaţi – Liga I – 15 Oct 2006; 3–1 (A) v Jiul Petroşani – Liga I – 11 Nov 2006; 2–0 (H) v Jiul Petroşani – Liga I – 19 May 2007
Worst result	2–5 (H) v UTA Arad – Liga I – 5 Aug 2006; 0–3 (A) v Gloria Bistriţa – Liga I – 20 Sep 2006
Most appearances	(Romania) Ştefan Apostol with 32 appearances
Top scorer	(Moldova) Viorel Frunză (10 goals)
Points	50/102 (49.01%)

Last updated: 23 May

==== Performances ====
Updated to games played on 23 May 2007.

	All								Home						Away					
	Pld	Pts	W	D	L	GF	GA	GD	W	D	L	GF	GA	GD	W	D	L	GF	GA	GD
League	34	50	13	11	10	41	44	-3	9	5	3	25	20	+5	4	6	7	16	24	-8
Overall	34	–	13	12	10	41	44	-3	9	5	3	25	20	+5	4	7	7	16	24	-8

==== Goal minutes ====
Updated to games played on 23 May 2007.

1'–15'	16'–30'	31'–HT	46'–60'	61'–75'	76'–FT	Extra time
6	8	6	5	4	12	0

== Liga I ==
=== League table ===
Pos	Team	Pld	W	D	L	GF	GA	GD	Pts	Qualification or relegation
6	Gloria Bistrița	34	16	6	12	42	35	+7	54	Qualification to Intertoto Cup first round
7	Politehnica Timișoara	34	15	8	11	37	33	+4	53	
8	Vaslui	34	13	11	10	41	44	−3	50	
9	FC U Craiova	34	12	12	10	39	43	−4	48	
10	Unirea Urziceni	34	13	8	13	30	29	+1	47	

Source: LT (in Romanian)
Rules for classification: 1) points; 2) head-to-head points; 3) head-to-head goal difference; 4) head-to-head goals scored; 5) goal difference; 6) number of goals scored.

=== Results summary ===
Overall								Home						Away					
Pld	W	D	L	GF	GA	GD	Pts	W	D	L	GF	GA	GD	W	D	L	GF	GA	GD
34	13	11	10	41	44	−3	50	9	5	3	25	20	+5	4	6	7	16	24	−8

=== Results by round ===
Round	1	2	3	4	5	6	7	8	9	10	11	12	13	14	15	16	17	18	19	20	21	22	23	24	25	26	27	28	29	30	31	32	33	34
Ground	A	H	H	A	H	A	H	A	H	A	H	A	H	A	H	A	H	H	A	A	H	A	H	A	H	A	H	A	H	A	H	A	H	A
Result	D	L	L	L	W	L	L	L	D	D	W	L	W	W	W	W	W	D	W	D	W	D	D	D	W	L	D	L	D	L	W	W	W	D
Position	11	13	16	18	16	16	17	17	17	17	16	16	15	15	13	10	8	8	7	8	7	7	7	7	6	7	7	11	10	11	9	8	8	8

Updated to match(es) played on 23 May 2007. Source: LPF
A = Away; H = Home; W = Win; D = Draw; L = Loss

=== Matches ===
#	Kick Off	Opponents	H / A	Result	Scorers	Captain	Referee	Attendance	Position
1	2006-07-29 17:00	Universitatea Craiova	A	0–0		Croitoru	Alexandru Tudor	5,000	11th
2	2006-08-05 18:00	UTA Arad	H	2–5	Bukvić 19', V. Frunză 90'	Croitoru	Mugurel Drăgănescu	2,000	13th
3	2006-09-13 18:00	Farul	H	1–3	Croitoru 42'	Croitoru	Sorin Corpodean	5,000	16th
4	2006-19-08 20:00	FC Steaua București	A	1–3	Gheorghiu 22'	Croitoru	Lucian Dan	5,000	18th
5	2006-26-08 18:00	FC Argeş	H	1–0	Gheorghiu 5'	Croitoru	Mugurel Drăgănescu	3,000	16th
6	2006-09-09 21:00	FC Rapid București	A	0–2		Croitoru	Alexandru Tudor	7,000	16th
7	2006-17-09 17:00	FC Dinamo București	H	1–2	Bukvić 82'	Croitoru	Tiberiu Lajos	8,000	17th
8	2006-20-09 17:00	Gloria Bistriţa	A	0–3		Bukvić	Ovidiu Haţegan	1,000	17th
9	2006-24-09 17:00	Poli Iaşi	H	1–1	V. Frunză 24'	Buhuş	Augustus Constantin	7,000	17th
10	2006-30-09 17:00	CFR Cluj	A	2–2	Madžar 13', Croitoru 74'	Buhuş	Marius Martiş	3,000	17th
11	2006-15-10 15:00	Oţelul Galaţi	H	3–1	V. Frunză 22', 33', 74'	Buhuş	Sorin Corpodean	5,000	16th
12	2006-20-10 15:00	Unirea Urziceni	A	0–1		Buhuş	Sebastian Colţescu	1,000	16th
13	2006-28-10 15:00	Ceahlăul	H	3–2	V. Frunză 35', 76', Gheorghiu 78'	Buhuş	Ovidiu Haţegan	3,000	15th
14	2006-04-11 18:30	FC Naţional	A	1–0	V. Frunză 30'	Buhuş	Robert Dumitru	200	15th
15	2006-11-11 14:00	Pandurii	H	1–0	Popete 5' (o.g.)	Buhuş	Vasile Bratu	6,000	13th
16	2006-19-11 14:00	Jiul Petroşani	A	3–1	Ivan 4', Croitoru 42', V. Frunză 56'	Buhuş	Anton Heleşteanu	1,000	10th
17	2006-25-11 14:00	Poli Timişoara	H	1–0	Neagu 48'	Buhuş	Alexandru Deaconu	8,000	8th
18	2006-02-12 13:00	Universitatea Craiova	H	3–3	Gheorghiu 81', Croitoru 86', Sabou 90' (pen)	Buhuş	Marian Salomir	8,000	8th
19	2006-08-12 13:00	UTA Arad	A	1–0	V. Frunză 45'	Buhuş	Victor Berbecaru	1,000	7th
20	2007-24-02 16:00	Farul	A	1–1	Sabou 73'	Apostol	Sorin Corpodean	1,000	8th
21	2007-04-03 15:30	FC Steaua București	H	1–0	Neagu 79'	Buhuş	Sebastian Colţescu	9,000	7th
22	2007-10-03 14:00	FC Argeş	A	1–1	Temwanjera 46'	Buhuş	Orlando Trandu	5,000	7th
23	2007-17-03 15:30	FC Rapid București	H	1–1	Buhăescu 84'	Buhuş	Alexandru Tudor	8,000	7th
24	2007-30-03 20:45	FC Dinamo București	A	0–0		Buhuş	Mugurel Drăgănescu	5,000	7th
25	2007-06-04 17:00	Gloria Bistriţa	H	3–2	Temwanjera 20', Panait 70' (pen), Mureşan 79' (o.g.)	Buhuş	Marius Bocăneală	7,000	6th
26	2007-15-04 20:00	Poli Iaşi	A	0–2		Buhuş	Alexandru Tudor	12,000	7th
27	2007-21-04 17:00	CFR Cluj	H	0–0		Buhuş	Anton Heleşteanu	6,000	7th
28	2007-25-04 17:00	Oţelul Galaţi	A	0–2		Buhuş	Alexandru Deaconu	8,000	11th
29	2007-28-04 17:30	Unirea Urziceni	H	0–0		Panait	Sebastian Colţescu	5,000	10th
30	2007-06-05 20:00	Ceahlăul	A	2–3	Gheorghiu 2', Temwanjera 84'	Panait	Marius Martiş	3,000	11th
31	2007-09-05 18:00	Naţional	H	1–0	Buhăescu 29'	Panait	Ionică Serea	5,000	9th
32	2007-12-05 18:15	Pandurii	A	2–1	Panait 25' (pen), Ljubinković 59'	Buhuş	Ovidiu Haţegan	1,500	8th
33	2007-19-05 17:00	Jiul Petroşani	H	2–0	Gheorghiu 4', 54'	Buhuş	Andrei Ioniţă	1,800	8th
34	2007-23-05 17:00	Poli Timişoara	A	2–2	Panait 38' (pen), Ljubinković 88'	Buhuş	Mugurel Drăgănescu	-	8th

== Cupa României ==
Kick-off listed in local time (EET)

Round	Kick Off	Opponents	H / A	Result	Scorers	Captain	Referee	Attendance
R32	2006-25-10 14:00	Apullum Alba Iulia	N	0–0	Pen: Gheorghiu (penalty scored) , V. Frunză (penalty scored) , Doboş (penalty missed) , Apostol (penalty missed)	Buhuş	align=center|200	
