= 2007–08 FC Vaslui season =

FC Vaslui
2007–08 season
- Owner: (Romania) Adrian Porumboiu
- President: (Romania) Ciprian Damian
- Manager: (Romania) Dorinel Munteanu (Sacked on Mar 31, 2008) (Romania) Emil Săndoi (From Apr 01, 2008)
- Stadium: Municipal
- Liga I: 7th
- Cupa României: Round of 32, eliminated
- Top goalscorer: League: (Serbia) Marko Ljubinković (16); All: (Serbia) Marko Ljubinković (16)
- Highest home attendance: 10,000 vs FC Steaua București (30 March 2008)
- Lowest home attendance: 3,000 vs Ceahlăul (9 April 2008)

The 2007–08 season is FC Vaslui's 6th season of its existence, and its 3rd in a row, in Liga I. In the summer, Adrian Porumboiu revealed that the new coach would be Dorinel Munteanu. He also announced that the team's objective that season, would be a European Cup. FC Vaslui made only 2 transfers in the summer, Bălace and Matei. Also, Petar Jovanović and the team captain Sorin Frunză returned from their loans. FC Vaslui started the season very well, in the second Matchday, beating Liga I champions, Dinamo on their own field, with 2–0. For 2 Matchdays, FC Vaslui was on the 1st place in Liga I. But during the first half, team fatigue appeared, and performance declined. However, in the last match in 2007, FC Vaslui beat once again Dinamo, with 2 beautiful goals scored by Sorin Frunză. In the winter break, N'Doye and Hugo Luz were the only signings. In the Matchday 25, FC Vaslui lost against Steaua, and Adrian Porumboiu accused Dorinel Munteanu that he sold the match to Steaua. Munteanu was sacked, and Bălace, Sabou and Frunză were sent to the second team. Emil Săndoi was named the new coach. With the new coach, FC Vaslui had one terrible final season, having only one victory. In the Matchday 33, FC Vaslui lost the 7th place, who assured UEFA Intertoto Cup, for Oţelul, but TAS decided FC Vaslui to win the match against Oţelul, because they used 2 players suspended. After a 2–4 with Rapid, and a 0–0 draw for Oţelul, FC Vaslui qualified for UEFA Intertoto Cup, this being the team's most important achievement in its short history.

== Squad ==
Note: Flags indicate national team as defined under FIFA eligibility rules; some limited exceptions apply. Players may hold more than one non-FIFA nationality.

No.	Pos.	Nation	Player
1	GK	ROU	Mihai Luca
2	MF	ROU	Marius Doboş
3	DF	ROU	Dorian Andronic
4	DF	ROU	Bogdan Panait
5	DF	ROU	Ştefan Mardare
6	DF	ROU	Laurențiu Ivan
8	MF	MDA	Denis Zmeu
9	FW	ROU	Răzvan Neagu
10	MF	ROU	Sorin Frunză (captain)
11	MF	ROU	Adrian Gheorghiu
15	DF	ROU	Bogdan Buhuş
16	MF	ROU	Daniel Sabou
17	DF	ROU	Silviu Bălace

No.	Pos.	Nation	Player
18	FW	ROU	Vasile Buhăescu
19	FW	ZIM	Mike Temwanjera
20	MF	SRB	Marko Ljubinković
21	MF	SEN	Ousmane N'Doye
22	GK	ROU	Claudiu Puia
23	FW	ROU	Marius Matei
24	DF	ROU	Ştefan Apostol
25	DF	ROU	Şerban Moraru
26	FW	SRB	Milorad Bukvić
27	DF	POR	Hugo Luz
30	MF	SRB	Petar Jovanović
81	GK	ROU	Cristian Hăisan (vice-captain)

== Transfers ==
=== In ===
==== Summer ====
#	Pos	Player	From	Fee	Date
7	MF	(Romania) Dorinel Munteanu	Free agent	Free	June 2007
10	MF	(Romania) Sorin Frunză	FC Botoşani	End of loan	13-06-2007
14	MF	(Serbia) Veljko Nikitović	Free agent	Free	04-07-2007
17	DF	(Romania) Silviu Bălace	FC Dinamo București	€350,000	October 2007
23	FW	(Romania) Marius Matei	FC Botoşani	Undisclosed	20-06-2007
30	MF	(Serbia) Petar Jovanović	FK Mladenovac	End of loan	26-06-2007

==== Winter ====
#	Pos	Player	From	Fee	Date
21	MF	(Senegal) Ousmane N'Doye	Académica de Coimbra	€550,000	28-12-2007
27	DF	(Portugal) Hugo Luz	S.C. Olhanense	€50,000	28-12-2007

=== Out ===
==== Summer ====
#	Pos	Player	To	Fee	Date
22	MF	(Romania) Horaţiu Popa	–	Retired	June 2007
23	MF	(Romania) Cornel Cornea	FC Botoşani	€40,000	03-09-2007

==== Winter ====
#	Pos	Player	To	Fee	Date
14	FW	(Serbia) Veljko Nikitović	Górnik Łęczna	Released	31-12-2007
21	DF	(Romania) Bogdan Cotolan	CSM Focşani	Loan	28-01-2008
7	MF	(Romania) Dorinel Munteanu	–	Released	31-03-2008

=== Overall ===
==== Spending ====
Summer: ▼€350,000

Winter: ▼€650,000

Total: ▼€950,000

==== Income ====
Summer: ▲€0

Winter: ▲€0

Total: ▲€0

==== Outcome ====
Summer: ▼€350,000

Winter: ▼€600,000

Total: ▼€950,000

== Statistics ==
=== Appearances and goals ===
Last updated on 28 May 2007.

No.	Pos	Nat	Player	Total		Liga I		Cupa României	
No.	Pos	Nat	Player	Apps	Goals	Apps	Goals	Apps	Goals
1	GK	(Romania) ROU	Mihai Luca	0	0	0	0	0	0
2	MF	(Romania) ROU	Marius Doboş	6	0	1+4	0	1	0
3	DF	(Romania) ROU	Dorian Andronic	17	1	13+3	1	1	0
4	DF	(Romania) ROU	Bogdan Panait	13	0	4+8	0	1	0
5	DF	(Romania) ROU	Ştefan Mardare	28	0	28	0	0	0
6	DF	(Romania) ROU	Laurențiu Ivan	16	0	8+8	0	0	0
8	MF	(Moldova) MDA	Denis Zmeu	19	1	9+9	1	1	0
9	FW	(Romania) ROU	Răzvan Neagu	10	0	0+9	0	1	0
10	MF	(Romania) ROU	Sorin Frunză	31	4	24+6	4	0+1	0
11	MF	(Romania) ROU	Adrian Gheorghiu	26	2	23+3	2	0	0
15	DF	(Romania) ROU	Bogdan Buhuş	27	0	26+1	0	0	0
16	MF	(Romania) ROU	Daniel Sabou	20	2	20	2	0	0
17	DF	(Romania) ROU	Silviu Bălace	28	1	26+2	1	0	0
18	MF	(Romania) ROU	Vasile Buhăescu	16	1	7+8	1	0+1	0
19	FW	(Zimbabwe) ZIM	Mike Temwanjera	26	5	23+3	5	0	0
20	MF	(Serbia) SRB	Marko Ljubinković	30	16	30	16	0	0
21	MF	(Senegal) SEN	Ousmane N'Doye	13	1	13	1	0	0
22	GK	(Romania) ROU	Claudiu Puia	1	-3	0	0	1	-3
23	FW	(Romania) ROU	Marius Matei	21	2	14+6	2	1	0
24	DF	(Romania) ROU	Ştefan Apostol	22	0	21	0	1	0
25	DF	(Romania) ROU	Şerban Moraru	7	0	7	0	0	0
26	FW	(Serbia) SRB	Milorad Bukvić	21	3	4+16	3	1	0
27	DF	(Portugal) POR	Hugo Luz	9	0	9	0	0	0
30	MF	(Serbia) SRB	Petar Jovanović	24	2	13+10	2	1	0
81	GK	(Romania) ROU	Cristian Hăisan	34	-35	34	-35	0	0
Players sold or loaned out during the season
7	MF	(Romania) ROU	Dorinel Munteanu	16	0	16	0	0	0
14	MF	(Serbia) SRB	Veljko Nikitović	2	0	1	0	1	0
21	DF	(Romania) ROU	Bogdan Cotolan	1	0	0+1	0	0	0

=== Top scorers ===
Position	Nation	Number	Name	Liga I	Romanian Cup	Total
1	(Serbia)	20	Marko Ljubinković	16	0	16
2	(Zimbabwe)	19	Mike Temwanjera	5	0	5
3	(Romania)	10	Sorin Frunză	4	0	4
4	(Serbia)	26	Milorad Bukvić	4	0	3
5	(Romania)	11	Adrian Gheorghiu	2	0	2
=	(Serbia)	30	Petar Jovanović	2	0	2
=	(Romania)	23	Marius Matei	2	0	2
=	(Romania)	16	Daniel Sabou	2	0	2
9	(Romania)	3	Dorian Andronic	1	0	1
=	(Romania)	17	Silviu Bălace	1	0	1
=	(Romania)	18	Vasile Buhăescu	1	0	1
=	(Senegal)	21	Ousmane N'Doye	1	0	1
=	(Moldova)	8	Denis Zmeu	1	0	1
/	/	/	Own Goals	1	0	1
			TOTALS	42	0	42

=== Disciplinary record ===
Position	Nation	Number	Name	Liga I		Romanian Cup		Total	
Position	Nation	Number	Name	Booked	Sent off (straight red)	Booked	Sent off (straight red)	Booked	Sent off (straight red)
DF	(Romania)	3	Dorian Andronic	1	0	0	0	1	0
DF	(Romania)	4	Bogdan Panait	4	0	1	0	5	0
DF	(Romania)	5	Ştefan Mardare	9	1	0	0	9	1
DF	(Romania)	6	Laurențiu Ivan	2	0	0	0	2	0
MF	(Romania)	7	Dorinel Munteanu	4	0	0	0	4	0
MF	(Moldova)	8	Denis Zmeu	1	0	0	0	1	0
FW	(Romania)	9	Răzvan Neagu	2	0	0	0	2	0
MF	(Romania)	10	Sorin Frunză	1	0	0	0	1	0
MF	(Serbia)	14	Veljko Nikitović	0	0	1	0	1	0
MF	(Romania)	11	Adrian Gheorghiu	6	0	0	0	6	0
DF	(Romania)	15	Bogdan Buhuş	6	0	0	0	6	0
MF	(Romania)	16	Daniel Sabou	8	0	0	0	8	0
MF	(Romania)	17	Silviu Bălace	4	0	0	0	4	0
MF	(Romania)	18	Vasile Buhăescu	3	0	0	0	3	0
FW	(Zimbabwe)	19	Mike Temwanjera	5	1	0	0	5	1
MF	(Serbia)	20	Marko Ljubinković	7	0	0	0	7	0
DF	(Romania)	21	Bogdan Cotolan	1	0	0	0	1	0
MF	(Senegal)	21	Ousmane N'Doye	5	0	0	0	5	0
FW	(Romania)	23	Marius Matei	2	0	0	0	2	0
DF	(Romania)	24	Ştefan Apostol	6	0	0	0	6	0
DF	(Romania)	25	Şerban Moraru	2	0	0	0	2	0
FW	(Serbia)	26	Milorad Bukvić	4	0	0	0	4	0
DF	(Portugal)	27	Hugo Luz	1	0	0	0	1	0
MF	(Serbia)	30	Petar Jovanović	6	1	0	0	6	1
GK	(Romania)	81	Cristian Hăisan	1	1	0	0	1	1
			TOTALS	91	3	2	0	93	3

=== Overall ===
Games played	35 (34 Liga I, 1 Cupa României)
Games won	12 (12 Liga I)
Games drawn	11 (11 Liga I)
Games lost	12 (11 Liga I, 1 Cupa României)
Goals scored	44
Goals conceded	37
Goal difference	+7
Yellow cards	93
Red cards	3
Worst discipline	(Romania) Ştefan Mardare with 9 yellow cards and one red card
Best result	4-1 (H) v Gloria Buzău – Liga I – 7 Oct 2007; 3-0 (H) v Dacia Mioveni – Liga I – 23 Feb 2008; 3-0 (H) v Politehnica Timișoara – Liga I – 19 Mar 2008
Worst result	0-3 (A) v Universitatea Cluj – Cupa României – 26 Sep 2007
Most appearances	(Romania) Cristian Hăisan with 34 appearances
Top scorer	(Serbia) Marko Ljubinković (16 goals)
Points	47/102 (46.1%)

Last updated: 7 May

==== Performances ====
Updated to games played on 7 May 2008.

	All								Home						Away					
	Pld	Pts	W	D	L	GF	GA	GD	W	D	L	GF	GA	GD	W	D	L	GF	GA	GD
League	34	47	12	11	11	44	34	+10	8	5	4	25	14	+11	4	6	7	19	20	-1
Overall	34	–	12	11	12	44	37	+7	8	5	4	25	14	+11	4	6	8	19	23	-4

==== Goal minutes ====
Updated to games played on 7 May 2008.

1'–15'	16'–30'	31'–HT	46'–60'	61'–75'	76'–FT	Extra time
4	8	6	11	7	6	0

== Liga I ==
=== League table ===
Pos	Team	Pld	W	D	L	GF	GA	GD	Pts	Qualification or relegation
5	Unirea Urziceni	34	16	13	5	42	24	+18	61 (Note: RAP: 7 pts; DIN: 5 pts; UNI: 3 pts)	Qualification to UEFA Cup first round
6	Politehnica Timișoara	34	16	9	9	57	44	+13	57	Qualification to UEFA Cup first round
7	Vaslui	34	12	11	11	44	34	+10	47	Qualification to Intertoto Cup third round
8	Oțelul Galați	34	14	4	16	47	50	−3	46	
9	FC U Craiova	34	12	7	15	42	48	−6	43	

Source: LT (in Romanian)
Rules for classification: 1) points; 2) head-to-head points; 3) head-to-head goal difference; 4) head-to-head goals scored; 5) goal difference; 6) number of goals scored.

=== Results summary ===
Overall								Home						Away					
Pld	W	D	L	GF	GA	GD	Pts	W	D	L	GF	GA	GD	W	D	L	GF	GA	GD
34	12	11	11	44	34	+10	47	8	5	4	25	14	+11	4	6	7	19	20	−1

=== Results by round ===
Round	1	2	3	4	5	6	7	8	9	10	11	12	13	14	15	16	17	18	19	20	21	22	23	24	25	26	27	28	29	30	31	32	33	34
Ground	H	A	A	H	A	H	A	H	A	H	A	H	A	H	A	H	A	A	H	H	A	H	A	H	A	H	A	H	A	H	A	H	A	H
Result	D	W	D	W	W	W	L	W	L	W	D	D	W	L	D	D	L	D	W	W	D	D	W	W	L	L	D	L	L	D	L	W	L	L
Position	8	3	6	3	1	1	3	2	5	5	7	6	5	6	7	6	7	7	7	7	7	7	7	7	7	7	7	7	7	7	7	7	8	7

Updated to match(es) played on 7 May 2008. Source: LPF
A = Away; H = Home; W = Win; D = Draw; L = Loss

=== Matches ===
2007-07-27
19:00

FC Vaslui	2–2	UTA Arad
Ljubinković 43'; Temwanjera 54'		Varga 64'; Radovanović 76'

Municipal, Vaslui
Attendance: 6,000
Referee: Alexandru Deaconu

2007-08-04
20:45

Dinamo	0–2	FC Vaslui
		Bălace 47'; Gheorghiu 50'

Ştefan cel Mare, București
Attendance: 4,000
Referee: Tiberiu Lajos

2007-08-10
19:30

Dacia Mioveni	2–2	FC Vaslui
Baicu 62'; Lupaşcu 63'		Ljubinković 16', 74'

Dacia, Mioveni
Attendance: 2,000
Referee: Radu Petrescu

2007-08-18
17:00

FC Vaslui	2–0	Gloria Bistriţa
Ljubinković 33' (pen.); Gheorghiu 45'

Municipal, Vaslui
Attendance: 5,000
Referee: Mugurel Drăgănescu

2007-08-25
18:00

U Cluj	2–3	FC Vaslui
Sabo 60' (pen.); Süller 86'		Sabou 33'; Ljubinković 67'; Jovanović 85'

Ion Moina, Cluj-Napoca
Attendance: 600
Referee: Victor Berbecaru

2007-09-02
17:00

FC Vaslui	2–0	Oţelul Galaţi
Ljubinković 28'; Jovanović 86'

Municipal, Vaslui
Attendance: 7,000
Referee: Alexandru Tudor

2007-09-15
19:00

Politehnica Timișoara	2–1	FC Vaslui
Rušič 22', 36'		Ljubinković 28' (pen.)

Dan Păltinişanu, Timișoara
Attendance: 7,000
Referee: Sorin Corpodean

2007-09-23
17:00

FC Vaslui	2–0	Universitatea Craiova
Ljubinković 17'; Sabou 26'

Municipal, Vaslui
Attendance: 7,000
Referee: Ovidiu Haţegan

2007-09-29
20:45

Steaua	1–0	FC Vaslui
Rada 65'

Ghencea, București
Attendance: 7,472
Referee: Aurelian Bogaciu

2007-10-07
15:00

FC Vaslui	4–1	Gloria Buzău
Ljubinković 24', 38', 74'; Bukvić 45'		Liţu 55'

Municipal, Vaslui
Attendance: 5,000
Referee: Teodora Albon

2007-10-21
15:00

Ceahlăul	1–1	FC Vaslui
Ayza 49'		Ljubinković 10'

Ceahlăul, Piatra Neamț
Attendance: 2,000
Referee: Alexandru Deaconu

2007-10-28
15:00

FC Vaslui	1–1	Farul
Frunză 58'		Băcilă 72'

Municipal, Vaslui
Attendance: 5,000
Referee: Marius Avram

2007-10-31
16:45

Poli Iaşi	0–1	FC Vaslui
		Temwanjera 50'

Emil Alexandrescu, Iaşi
Attendance: 7,500
Referee: Alexandru Tudor

2007-11-04
16:00

FC Vaslui	0–2	CFR Cluj
		Trică 40'; Culio 73'

Municipal, Vaslui
Attendance: 7,000
Referee: Aurelian Bogaciu

2007-11-09
16:00

Pandurii	1–1	FC Vaslui
Orac 59'		Bukvić 83'

Tudor Vladimirescu, Târgu-Jiu
Attendance: 2,500
Referee: Ionel Ivan

2007-11-25
13:30

FC Vaslui	1–1	Unirea Urziceni
Bukvić 51'		Bilaşco 38'

Municipal, Vaslui
Attendance: 4,000
Referee: Ionică Serea

2007-12-01
20:30

Rapid	2–1	FC Vaslui
Césinha 17'; Mazilu 82'		Matei 51'

Giuleşti, București
Attendance: 3,000
Referee: Alexandru Tudor

2007-12-08
13:00

UTA Arad	1–1	FC Vaslui
Bălţoi 50'		Buhăescu 89'

UTA, Arad
Attendance: 2,000
Referee: Augustus Constantin

2007-12-16
13:00

FC Vaslui	2–1	Dinamo
Frunză 13', 62'		Bratu 47'

Municipal, Vaslui
Attendance: 5,000
Referee: Ovidiu Haţegan

2008-02-23
14:30

FC Vaslui	3–0	Dacia Mioveni
Ljubinković 46'; Jula 49' (o.g.); Temwanjera 53'

Municipal, Vaslui
Attendance: 5,000
Referee: Laurențiu Danşa

2008-03-01
13:30

Gloria Bistriţa	0–0	FC Vaslui

Municipal, Reghin
Attendance: 2,000
Referee: Augustus Constantin

2008-03-09
15:30

FC Vaslui	0–0	U Cluj

Municipal, Vaslui
Attendance: 9,000
Referee: Andrei Ioniţă

2008-03-15
15:00

Oţelul Galaţi	0–3	FC Vaslui
	forfait

Oţelul, Galaţi
Attendance: 8,000
Referee: Marius Avram

2008-03-19
15:00

FC Vaslui	3–0	Politehnica Timișoara
Andronic 3'; Zmeu 10'; Ljubinković 42' (pen.)

Municipal, Vaslui
Attendance: 4,000
Referee: Mugurel Drăgănescu

2008-03-23
15:00

Universitatea Craiova	2–1	FC Vaslui
Costea 45', 89'		Frunză 23'

Extensiv, Craiova
Attendance: 5,000
Referee: Victor Berbecaru

2008-03-30
16:00

FC Vaslui	0–1	Steaua
		P. Moreno 66'

Municipal, Vaslui
Attendance: 10,000
Referee: Istvan Kovacs

2008-04-06
16:30

Gloria Buzău	1–1	FC Vaslui
Ioviţă 81'		Matei 70'

Crâng, Buzău
Attendance: 3,000
Referee: Alexandru Tudor

2008-04-09
16:45

FC Vaslui	0–1	Ceahlăul
		Cernoch 25'

Municipal, Vaslui
Attendance: 3,000
Referee: Sorin Corpodean

2008-04-13
16:45

Farul	2–1	FC Vaslui
Nae 29'; Gerlem 64'		Ljubinković 88' (pen.)

Farul, Constanţa
Attendance: 2,000
Referee: Robert Dumitru

2008-04-19
18:30

FC Vaslui	0–0	Poli Iaşi

Municipal, Vaslui
Attendance: 8,000
Referee: Alexandru Deaconu

2008-04-23
20:30

CFR Cluj	1–0	FC Vaslui
Ruiz 50'

Gruia, Cluj-Napoca
Attendance: 8,000
Referee: Ionel Ivan

2008-04-26
16:15

FC Vaslui	1–0	Pandurii
Ljubinković 57'

Municipal, Vaslui
Attendance: 3,000
Referee: Victor Berbecaru

2008-05-03
18:30

Unirea Urziceni	2–0	FC Vaslui
Balint 20'; Onofraş 88'

Tineretului, Urziceni
Attendance: 2,000
Referee: Tiberiu Lajos

2008-05-07
17:00

FC Vaslui	2–4	Rapid
Temwanjera 62', 75'		Despotović 18', 28', 45'; Lazăr 58'

Municipal, Vaslui
Attendance: 8,000
Referee: Sebastian Colţescu

== Cupa României ==
Kick-off listed in local time (EET)

=== Sixteen finals ===
2007-09-26
15:30

U Cluj	3–0	FC Vaslui
Goga 28'; N. Jovanović 73', 86'

Ion Moina, Cluj-Napoca
Attendance: 600
Referee: Marian Bordean
