= List of FC Vaslui players =

Fotbal Club Vaslui are a Romanian professional association football club based in Vaslui, Romania, who currently are not playing in any league following their relegation from the Liga I due to the financial collapse. They have played at their current home ground, Municipal, since their foundation in 2002. Since playing their first competitive match, more than 200 players have made a competitive first-team appearance for the club, of whom almost 60 players have made at least 25 appearances (including substitute appearances); those players are listed here.

Vaslui's record appearance-maker is Mike Temwanjera, who made 202 appearances between 2007 until 2014. Lucian Sânmărtean has made the second most appearances with 149. 12 other players have made more than 100 appearances for the club. Wesley is the club's record goalscorer; he scored 77 goals in his three-and-a-half years at Vaslui. Wesley is the only player to score more than 50 goals for Vaslui; only three other players have scored more than 25 goals for the club.

== Players ==
- Appearances and goals are for first-team competitive matches only, including Divizia A / Liga I, Divizia B, Divizia C, Romanian Cup, UEFA Champions League, UEFA Cup / UEFA Europa League and UEFA Intertoto Cup matches.
- Players are listed according to the date of their first team début for the club.
- Positions are listed according to the tactical formations.
- Statistics correct as of 19 May 2014.

Table headers

- Nationality – If a player played international football, the country/countries he played for are shown. Otherwise, the player's nationality is given as their country of birth.
- Vaslui career – The year of the player's first appearance for Vaslui to the year of his last appearance.
- Starts – The number of games started.
- Sub – The number of games played as a substitute.
- Total – The total number of games played, both as a starter and as a substitute.

Positions key
GK	Goalkeeper
DF	Defender
MF	Midfielder
FW	Forward

Vaslui players with over 25 appearances
Name	Nationality	Position	Vaslui career	Starts	Subs	Total	Goals
Name	Nationality	Position	Vaslui career	Appearances			Goals
Emanuel Amarandei	Romania	DF	2002–2005	64	1	65	1
Sorin Frunză	Romania	MF	2002–2008	110	10	120	37
Valentin Badea	Romania	FW	2002–2006	90	15	105	43
Alin Pânzaru	Romania	DF	2002–2005	48	12	60	4
Cristian Hăisan	Romania	GK	2002–2010	91	1	92	0
Giani Căpuşă	Romania	FW	2003–2004	11	17	28	5
Sorin Ungurianu	Romania	MF	2003–2005	29	17	46	4
Darius Badea	Romania	DF	2003–2004	29	4	33	0
Florin Anghel	Romania	FW	2003–2004	24	1	25	12
Bogdan Panait	Romania	DF	2003–2008	96	15	111	8
Dinu Sânmărtean	Romania	DF	2003–2010	26	2	28	0
Gabriel Kajcsa	Romania	GK	2003–2005	43	0	43	0
Viorel Frunză	Moldova	FW	2004–2006	36	10	46	17
Horaţiu Popa	Romania	MF	2004–2007	21	13	34	2
Filip Popescu	Romania	FW	2004–2005	26	2	28	12
Tihamer Török	Romania	FW	2004–2005	29	11	40	9
Ionuţ Badea	Romania	MF	2005–2006	30	0	30	4
Ilie Baicu	Romania	DF	2005–2006	25	1	26	1
Bogdan Buhuş	Romania	DF	2005–2010	142	2	144	0
Petar Jovanović	Bosnia and Herzegovina	DF	2005–2012	61	30	91	4
Vasile Buhăescu	Romania	MF	2005–2013	37	86	123	9
Milorad Bukvić	Serbia	FW	2006–2008	32	30	62	8
Marius Croitoru	Romania	MF	2006–2007	32	1	33	6
Ştefan Apostol	Romania	DF	2006–2008	54	0	54	0
Adrian Gheorghiu	Romania	MF	2006–2012	87	42	129	11
Marko Ljubinković	Serbia	MF	2006–2010	96	8	104	24
Ştefan Mardare	Romania	DF	2006–2008	42	5	47	0
Răzvan Neagu	Romania	FW	2006–2011	22	33	55	3
Marius Doboş	Romania	MF	2006–2008	11	23	34	0
Laurențiu Ivan	Romania	DF	2006–2008	32	8	40	1
Daniel Sabou	Romania	MF	2006–2008	41	1	42	4
Mike Temwanjera	Zimbabwe	FW	2007–2014	176	26	202	49
Denis Zmeu	Moldova	MF	2007–2013	56	48	104	4
Dorian Andronic	Romania	DF	2007–2009	22	6	28	1
Ionuț Balaur	Romania	DF	2007–2014	26	8	34	2
Silviu Bălace	Romania	DF	2007–2011	65	15	80	3
Ousmane N'Doye	Senegal	MF	2008–2013	65	4	69	6
Hugo Luz	Portugal	DF	2008–2012	80	0	80	2
Lucian Burdujan	Romania	FW	2008–2010	58	10	68	17
Gabriel Cânu	Romania	DF	2008–2013	57	1	58	7
Stanislav Genchev	Bulgaria	MF	2008–2011	88	9	97	8
Dušan Kuciak	Slovenia	GK	2008–2011	107	0	107	0
Nemanja Jovanović	Serbia	FW	2008–2010	9	35	44	5
Pavol Farkas	Slovenia	DF	2009–2012	74	5	79	2
Nemanja Milisavljević	Serbia	MF	2009–2012	56	37	93	2
Miloš Pavlović	Serbia	MF	2009–2011	82	7	89	2
Wesley	Brazil	MF	2009–2012	134	5	139	77
Stéphane Zubar	France	DF	2009–2010	40	3	43	1
Paul Papp	Romania	DF	2009–2012	89	2	91	6
Gerlem	Brazil	MF	2009–2011	37	4	41	5
Raul Costin	Romania	MF	2009–2013	72	52	124	8
Roberto Delgado	Spain	MF	2009–2010	9	16	25	2
Zhivko Milanov	Bulgaria	DF	2010–2003	125	1	126	2
Lucian Sânmărtean	Romania	MF	2010–2013	135	14	149	12
Gladstone	Brazil	DF	2010–2012	26	5	31	1
Vytautas Černiauskas	Lithuania	GK	2010–2014	67	0	67	0
Adaílton	Brazil	FW	2010–2012	67	5	72	19
Yero Bello	Nigeria	FW	2010–2012	38	31	69	10
Nicolae Stanciu	Romania	MF	2012–2013	34	22	56	3
Cauê	Brazil	MF	2012–2013	48	5	53	3
Piotr Celeban	Poland	DF	2012–2014	58	1	59	13
Fernando Varela	Cape Verde	DF	2012–2013	41	0	41	2
Liviu Antal	Romania	MF	2012–2014	60	9	69	22
Adrian Sălăgeanu	Romania	DF	2012–2013	43	1	44	1
Andrei Cordoş	Romania	DF	2012–2014	19	7	26	0
Nuno Viveiros	Portugal	MF	2013–2014	23	2	25	3
Madson	Brazil	MF	2013–2014	25	2	27	3
Adrian Pătulea	Romania	FW	2013–2014	20	9	29	2

=== Honours as Captain ===
Captain	Nationality	Honours as Captain
Sorin Frunză	Romania	2005 Divizia B
Bogdan Buhuş	Romania	2008 UEFA Intertoto Cup
Wesley	Brazil	2010 Cupa României Final; 2012 Liga I runner-up

== List of International Players ==
	Name	Position	National team	Caps (Goals) with Vaslui	Total Caps (Goals)	Reference
1	Denis Zmeu	MF	Moldova	20 (1)	20 (1)
2	Fernando Varela	DF	Cape Verde	10 (1)	25 (3)
3	Paul Papp	DF	Romania	10 (0)	11 (1)
4	Elias Charalambous	DF	Cyprus	9 (0)	63 (0)
5	Zhivko Milanov	DF	Bulgaria	9 (0)	23 (0)
6	Ousmane N'Doye	MF	Senegal	8 (0)	27 (1)
7	Serge Akakpo	DF	Togo	7 (0)	40 (0)
8	Viorel Frunză	FW	Moldova	5 (0)	35 (7)
9	Piotr Celeban	DF	Poland	5 (0)	10 (0)
10	Stanislav Genchev	MF	Bulgaria	5 (0)	6 (1)
11	Lucian Sânmărtean	MF	Romania	4 (0)	7 (0)
12	Dorinel Munteanu	MF	Romania	3 (0)	134 (14)
13	Marius Niculae	FW	Romania	2 (0)	44 (15)
14	Carlo Costly	FW	Honduras	1 (0)	68 (30)
15	Milan Borjan	GK	Canada	1 (0)	16 (0)
16	Dušan Kuciak	GK	Slovakia	1 (0)	10 (0)
17	Marian Aliuţă	MF	Romania	1 (0)	5 (0)
