= FC Vaslui II =

- Full name: Fotbal Club Vaslui II
- Nickname(s): Galben-verzii (The Yellow-Greens); Vasluienii (The Vaslui People)
- Short name: Vaslui II
- Founded: 2007; 18 years ago
- Dissolved: 2014; 11 years ago
- Ground: Fepa 74
- Capacity: 6,000

FC Vaslui II was a Romanian professional football club from Vaslui, Romania, founded in 2007. It was the reserve team of FC Vaslui. The team was dissolved in 2014 due to lack of funds.

In the first season, with Costinel Botez on the bench, the yellow-greens won the Liga IV – Vaslui County, qualifying for promotion play-off to third division. But, despite the fact that it benefited of eight players from the first team, Silviu Bălace, Vasile Buhăescu, Bogdan Panait, Laurențiu Ivan, Răzvan Neagu amongst them, lost the promotion losing 0–1, on neutral ground, at Aerostar Stadium in Bacău, to FC Panciu, the winner of Liga IV – Vrancea County.

== Honours ==
Liga IV – Vaslui County

- Winners (2): 2007–08, 2008–09
