= Mardare =

Mardare is a Moldovan and Romanian surname. Notable people with the surname include:

- Andrian Mardare (born 1995), Moldovan javelin thrower
- Ștefan Mardare (born 1987), Romanian footballer
