= Aleksandar Madžar =

Aleksandar Madžar may refer to:

- Aleksandar Madžar (soccer) (born 1978), Montenegrin footballer
- Aleksandar Madžar (musician) (born 1968), Serbian pianist
