= CSM Moinești =

Romanian football club

- Full name: Club Sportiv Municipal Moinești
- Nicknames: Petroliștii (The Oilmen); Găzarii (The Oilmen); Moineștenii (The People from Moinești)
- Short name: Moinești
- Founded: 1948; 78 years ago as Petrolul Moinești; 2009; 17 years ago as CSM Moinești
- Ground: Petrolul
- Capacity: 2,500
- Owner: Moinești Municipality
- Chairman: Nelu Hirlea
- Manager: Sorin Trofin
- League: Liga IV
- 2025–26: Liga IV, Bacău County, 10th of 22
Home colours	Away colours

Club Sportiv Municipal Moinești, commonly known as CSM Moinești, or simply as Moinești, is a Romanian amateur football club based in Moinești, Bacău County, founded in 1948 under the name of Petrolul Moinești. The club was declared bankrupt in 2008 and was re-founded as CSM Moinești. CSM is currently playing in the Liga IV and never played higher than Liga II, second tier of the Romanian football league system.

== History ==
Founded in 1948 as Petrolul Moinești, the club took its name from the oil industry in the Moinești region. In 1950 the name was changed to Flacăra Moinești. Renamed Energia Moinești, the club played for the first time in Divizia C during the 1956 season, finishing 8th in Series I. The following year the club reverted to the name Petrolul Moinești and finished the 1957–58 season in 7th place, followed by a 4th-place finish in 1958–59. After Divizia C was shut down in 1959, Petrolul competed in the Bacău Regional Championship, Series II, ranking runners-up in the 1959–60 season and 5th in 1960–61. Renamed Petrolul Moldova Moinești, the team finished 3rd in 1961–62, and after reverting to the Petrolul name it finished as runners-up in the 1962–63 season under coach Ioan Talpă and was promoted to the newly refounded Divizia C.

Placed in the East Series of Divizia C, Petrolul finished 12th in 1963–64 but avoided relegation as all four series were expanded from twelve to fourteen teams. The club went on to finish 11th in 1964–65, runners-up in 1965–66, 11th in 1966–67 and 7th in 1967–68. Assigned to Series I, Petrolul ranked 9th in 1968–69, 7th in 1969–70 and 4th in the 1970–71 season. In the 1971–72 season, Petrolul won Series II and qualified for the promotion play-off, where it finished 2nd in Group I after a 2–3 loss to Delta Tulcea and a 3–1 win against ITA Pașcani.

In the 1972–73 season, Petrolul Moinești finished runners-up in Series II, tied on points with Viitorul Vaslui, and promoted to the second division as Divizia B was expanded to three series, which allowed all second-placed teams from the twelve Divizia C groups to go up. Ranked 17th in the 1973–74 season, Petrolul was immediately relegated back to the third division. Competing again in Series II of Divizia C, Petrolul finished runners-up in 1974–75, six points behind Viitorul Vaslui, and in the 1975–76 season ended tied on points with Relonul Săvinești. The following years brought a series of mid-table positions: 4th in 1976–77, 5th in 1977–78 and 1978–79, 10th in 1979–80, 13th in 1980–81, 6th in 1981–82, 3rd in 1982–83, 7th in 1983–84 and 1984–85, 8th in 1985–86, 6th in 1986–87, 5th in 1987–88, 9th in 1988–89, 5th in 1989–90 and 9th in 1990–91.

Petrolul finished the 1991–92 season in 9th place in Series II but was relegated to the fourth division due to the reorganization of the competitive system. One year later, Petrolul Moinești won the Bacău County Championship and returned to the third division by defeating Rulmentul Bârlad, the Vaslui County champions, over two legs, 4–2 away and 2–1 at home. The team finished the 1993–94 season in 2nd place in Series I, seven points behind Cetatea Târgu Neamț. After a 6th-place finish in 1994–95, Petrolul claimed first place at the end of the 1995–96 season, securing promotion to Divizia B.

A top-half 5th-place finish in the 1996–97 season ensured their survival in the second division for the first time. The team also reached the Round of 32 of the Cupa României, where it lost 0–2 to first-division side Universitatea Cluj. The lineup used by coach Gheorghe Poenaru was Moței – Țoc, Trofin, Alexescu, Moldovernu – Florian (66 Vătavu), Burleanu, P. Ioan (79 Podoabă), Axinte (66 L. Toma) – Curigan, Apachiței.

In the following season, Petrolul finished once again in the upper half of the table, in 6th place, but dropped to 15th in 1998–99 and was eventually relegated to Divizia C at the end of the 1999–2000 season. The team bounced back quickly, winning Series I of Divizia C in the 2000–01 season to return to the second division.

In the 2001–02 Divizia B season, Petrolul competed in Series I, finished 16th and was relegated, but also managed to reach the Round of 32 in the Cupa României, where it lost 0–3 in front of FCM Bacău. The squad aligned by Gheorghe Poenaru included Moței – Chișăreanu, Alexescu (75 N. Cernat), Chiriac, Geamăn, Cioran – Bucurel, L. Toma (71 Vasilachi), Jipa, Fl. Pavel (71 Câmpanu) – Iriza.

Led by Emil Vlăduț, Petrolul Moinești won Series I of the 2002–03 Divizia C season, finishing three points ahead of the main contenders FC Vaslui and Laminorul Roman and earning immediate promotion back to the second division. The squad included, among others, Anton, Lazăr, Alexescu, Cioabă, Chiriac, Bucurel, Jipa, Toma, Lalciu, Moldoveanu, Bălan, Mladin, Cazacu, Cernat, Cruceanu, Vasilachi, Coman, Iriza, Dobre, and V. Gheorghe.

Assigned to Series I, Petrolul then spent the next three seasons in Divizia B, where in 2003–04 under Petre Grigoraș, the team ranked 4th and also reached the Round of 16 of the Cupa României, losing 0–1 to FC Argeș Pitești. Petrolul continued with a 6th-place finish in 2004–05 under Giani Florian, before being relegated at the end of the 2005–06 campaign after finishing 13th under Dan Moței.

Petrolul continued its run of poor results, finishing the 2006–07 season in 16th place in Series I of Liga III and being relegated to the fourth tier. Renamed FC Moinești, the team, coached by Sorin Condurache, won the 2007–08 Liga IV – Bacău County and secured promotion to Liga III after defeating Voința Pângărați, the Neamț County champions, 4–1 in the promotion play-off. However, due to financial difficulties, the club did not register for the third tier.

A revival followed in August 2009, when the newly established Club Sportiv Municipal was founded with the aim of continuing the tradition of Moinești football. The restart came from the bottom, in Liga V – Bacău County, the fifth tier and second level of county football, with a squad composed exclusively of local players whose average age was just 19. Coached by Giani Florian, CSM Moinești won the 2009–10 season and earned promotion to the top county level.

== Chronology of names ==
Name	Period
Petrolul Moinești	1948–1950
Flacăra Moinești	1950–1956
Energia Moinești	1956–1958
Petrolul Moinești	1958–2012
CSM Moinești	2012–present

== Honours ==
Liga III

- Winners (4): 1971–72, 1995–96, 2000–01, 2002–03
- Runners-up (5): 1965–66, 1972–73, 1974–75, 1975–76, 1993–94

Liga IV – Bacău County

- Winners (3): 1992–93, 2007–08, 2011–12

Bacău Regional Championship

- Winners (1): 1954

== League and Cup history ==
Season	Tier	Division	Place	Notes	Cupa României
2024–25	4	Liga IV (BC) (Seria I)	3rd	4th PO	
2023–24	4	Liga IV (BC) (Seria II)	4th		
2022–23	4	Liga IV (BC) (Seria II)	3rd		
2021–22	4	Liga IV (BC) (Seria II)	3rd		
2020–21	Not active				
2019–20	4	Liga IV (BC) (Seria II)	3rd		
2018–19	4	Liga IV (BC)	5th		
2017–18	4	Liga IV (BC)	11th		
2016–17	4	Liga IV (BC)	9th		
2015–16	4	Liga IV (BC)	11th		
2014–15	4	Liga IV (BC)	6th		
2013–14	3	Liga III (Seria I)	8th	Withdrew	
2012–13	3	Liga III (Seria I)	3rd		
2011–12	4	Liga IV (BC)	1st (C)	Promoted	
2010–11	4	Liga IV (BC)	4th		
2009–10	5	Liga V (BC)	1st (C)	Promoted	
2008–09	Not active				
2007–08	4	Liga IV (BC)	1st (C)	Withdrew	

Season	Tier	Division	Place	Notes	Cupa României
2006–07	3	Liga III (Seria I)	16th	Relegated	
2005–06	2	Divizia B (Seria I)	13th	Relegated	
2004–05	2	Divizia B (Seria I)	6th		
2003–04	2	Divizia B (Seria I)	4th		Round of 16
2002–03	3	Divizia C (Seria I)	1st (C)	Promoted	
2001–02	2	Divizia B (Seria I)	14th	Relegated	Round of 32
2000–01	3	Divizia C (Seria I)	1st (C)	Promoted	
1999–00	2	Divizia B (Seria I)	15th	Relegated	
1998–99	2	Divizia B (Seria I)	15th		
1997–98	2	Divizia B (Seria I)	6th		
1996–97	2	Divizia B (Seria I)	5th		Round of 32
1995–96	3	Divizia C (Seria I)	1st (C)	Promoted	
1994–95	3	Divizia C (Seria I)	6th		
1993–94	3	Divizia C (Seria I)	2nd		
1992–93	4	Divizia D (BC)	1st (C)	Promoted	
1991–92	3	Divizia C (Seria II)	9th	Relegated	
1990–91	3	Divizia C (Seria II)	9th		
1989–90	3	Divizia C (Seria II)	5th		

== Notable former players ==
The footballers mentioned below have played at least one season for CSM Moinești and also played in Liga I for another team.

- (Romania) Ștefan Apostol
- (Romania) Bogdan Buhuș
- (Romania) Adrian Gheorghiu
- (Romania) Laurențiu Ivan
- (Romania) Florin Petcu
- (Romania) Eduard Tismănaru
- (Romania) Sorin Trofin

== Former managers ==
- (Romania) Gheorghe Bărbulescu (1957)
- (Romania) Gheorghe Poenaru (1992–1999)
- (Romania) Emil Vlăduț (2002–2003)
- (Romania) Petre Grigoraș (2003–2004)
