= Veljko Nikitović =

Serbian footballer

Personal information
- Full name: Veljko Nikitović
- Date of birth: 3 October 1980 (age 46)
- Place of birth: Belgrade, SFR Yugoslavia
- Height: 1.86 m (6 ft 1 in)
- Position: Defensive midfielder

Senior career*
Years	Team	Apps	(Gls)
2000–2001	Mladost Lučani		
2001	Górnik Łęczna		
2001–2002	Mladost Lučani		
2002–2003	Hajduk Beograd		
2004–2007	Górnik Łęczna	71	(4)
2007	Vaslui	1	(0)
2008–2016	Górnik Łęczna	213	(13)
2018–2019	Tur Milejów	0	(0)
2020–2022	Błękit Cyców	27	(8)
2024	LKS Biskupice	2	(1)
- * Club domestic league appearances and goals

Veljko Nikitović (Serbian Cyrillic: Beљкo Hикитoвић ; born 3 October 1980) is a Serbian football executive and former professional player who was most recently the sporting director of Polish club Motor Lublin. Regarded as one of the most important players in Górnik Łęczna's history, he made over 300 appearances for the Zielono-Czarni and held multiple roles within the club after retirement.

== Playing career ==
In February 2004, Nikitović joined Górnik Łęczna from Hajduk Beograd.

In the summer of 2007, he moved to Vaslui.

In February 2008, Nikitović returned to Górnik Łęczna and signed a three-and-a-half-year contract.

== Post-retirement ==
Shortly after retiring in July 2016, Nikitović joined Górnik Łęczna's staff as an assistant coach and scout. He held the role until 26 April 2017, when he became a board member of the club, and was mainly responsible for coordinating the club's academy and youth systems.

On 17 July 2017, he was appointed chairman of the club. Nikitović stepped down on 13 December 2018, and took on the role of sporting director the following day. On 30 May 2024, he announced on Facebook that he was departing Górnik, after over 20 years as a player, staff and club management member. During his time as an executive, he oversaw Górnik's relegation from the I liga in 2018, as well as their climb back to the top-tier with two consecutive promotions, before Górnik was demoted again after just one year in the Ekstraklasa in 2022.

On 9 June 2024, Nikitović was announced as the new sporting director of fellow I liga club Arka Gdynia. By the end of 2025, he was heavily linked with Motor Lublin, with the club's chairman Zbigniew Jakubas confirming his intent to hire Nikitović as Motor's sporting director. Nikitović left Arka on 5 May 2026.

On 14 May 2026, Nikitović joined Motor Lublin as their new sporting director. He was dismissed four months later, on 30 September.

== Honours ==
Górnik Łęczna

- III liga, group IV: 2007–08

Błękit Cyców

- Klasa A Lublin III: 2020–21
