= Kobi Nachtailer =

Israeli footballer

Personal information
- Full name: Jacov Nachtailer
- Date of birth: 9 November 1978 (age 47)
- Place of birth: Israel
- Position: Defender

Youth career
- Maccabi Tel Aviv
- Hapoel Tel Aviv

Senior career*
Years	Team	Apps	(Gls)
1997–1999	Hapoel Tel Aviv	10	
1999–2000	Maccabi Sha'arayim		
2000–2001	Beitar Be'er Sheva		
2001–2002	Hapoel Petah Tikva	25	(1)
2002–2003	Hapoel Kfar Saba	18	(0)
2003–2004	Maccabi Tel Aviv	0	(0)
2004	VfL Osnabrück	12	(0)
2004–2006	Hapoel Nazareth Illit	42	(1)
2006–2007	FC Vaslui	8	(0)

International career
1994	Israel U16	45	(1)
- * Club domestic league appearances and goals

Kobi Nachtailer (Hebrew: קובי נכטיילר; born 9 November 1978) is an Israeli former professional footballer who played as a defender. He was the first Israeli to play an official match for a Romanian football club.

== International career ==
On 9 August 1994, Nachtailer made his debut for the Israel U16 team against the Hungary U16 in a competition hosted by the Hungarian Football Federation. After that he had 57 games in the U16 to U18 national teams.
