= Sorin Trofin =

Romanian footballer

Personal information
- Full name: Ionel Sorin Trofin
- Date of birth: 31 January 1976 (age 50)
- Place of birth: Bălan, Romania
- Height: 1.80 m (5 ft 11 in)
- Position: Left midfielder

Team information
- Current team: Moinești (player-manager)

Senior career*
Years	Team	Apps	(Gls)
1996–1998	Petrolul Moinești	42	(4)
1998–2001	FCM Bacău	99	(13)
2001–2002	Farul Constanţa	14	(1)
2003–2007	FCM Bacău	75	(2)
2007–2008	Dacia Mioveni	20	(0)
2008–2009	Știinţa Bacău	?	(?)
2009–	Moinești	?	(?)

International career
2000	Romania	2	(0)

Managerial career
- 2012–: Moinești
- * Club domestic league appearances and goals as of 26 January 2018

Ionel Sorin Trofin (born 31 January 1976) is a Romanian footballer who plays as a midfielder and also manages Liga IV club Moinești since 2009. In his career Trofin played in Liga I for: FCM Bacău, Farul Constanţa and Dacia Mioveni.

== International career ==
Sorin Trofin played two games for Romania, both of them being friendlies against Algeria.
