= Bogdan Cotolan =

Romanian football player

Bogdan Viorel Cotolan
Personal information
- Date of birth: 4 November 1981 (age 44)
- Place of birth: Târgovişte, Romania
- Position: Defender

Senior career*
Years	Team	Apps	(Gls)
2002–2005	Gloria Buzău	80	(6)
2006	CFR Cluj	12	(0)
2007–2008	FC Vaslui	4	(0)
2008–2009	Cetatea Suceava	12	(0)
2009	CS Otopeni	0	(0)
- * Club domestic league appearances and goals as of 1 July 2009

Bogdan Viorel Cotolan (born 4 November 1981 in Targoviste, Romania) is a Romanian football player. Cotolan made his professional debut with Gloria Buzău in the Romanian second league. During the winter of 2005–06 he was tested by CFR Cluj, eventually signing a contract. Cotolan is a right defender and right midfielder, although he can also play on the left side of the pitch.

Below are Bogdan Cotolan's career statistics:

2002–2003 Gloria Buzău 2B / 15 games

2003–2004 Gloria Buzău 13B / 25 games / 3 goals

2004–2005 Gloria Buzău 9B / 21 games / 1 goal

2005–2006 Gloria Buzău 9B / 14 games / 2 goals

2005–2006 CFR Cluj 5A / 9 games

2006–2007 CFR Cluj A / 3 games

2007- FC Vaslui
