= Branko Radovanović =

Serbian footballer (born 1981)

Personal information
- Full name: Branko Radovanović
- Date of birth: 18 February 1981 (age 45)
- Place of birth: Beograd, SFR Yugoslavia
- Height: 1.90 m (6 ft 3 in)
- Position: Striker

Youth career
- Radnički Obrenovac

Senior career*
Years	Team	Apps	(Gls)
1996–1997	Čukarički	0	(0)
1999	Daewoo Royals	2	(0)
1999–2000	Zemun	0	(0)
2000–2001	Beograd	30	(20)
2002	Austria Salzburg Amateure	2	(0)
2002–2003	Železnik	23	(4)
2004–2005	Radnički Beograd	16	(2)
2005	Amkar Perm	0	(0)
2006	Kallithea	12	(2)
2006–2007	Wisła Kraków	11	(3)
2007–2008	UTA Arad	4	(1)
- * Club domestic league appearances and goals

Branko Radovanović (Serbian Cyrillic: Бранко Радовановић; born 18 February 1981) is a Serbian retired footballer who played as a striker.

== Career ==
He retired after a stint with UTA Arad in the Romanian Liga I. He also played for a number of clubs, such as Serbian sides Čukarički, FK Beograd, Železnik and Radnički Beograd, South Korean clubs Pusan Daewoo Royals, Greek club Kallithea, as wells as Austria Salzburg, Russian Amkar Perm and Polish Wisła Kraków.
