= Denis Zmeu =

Moldovan footballer

Personal information
- Date of birth: 8 May 1985 (age 41)
- Place of birth: Chişinău, Moldovan SSR
- Height: 1.83 m (6 ft 0 in)
- Position: Central midfielder

Team information
- Current team: Moldova (fitness coach)

Youth career
- Zimbru Chişinău

Senior career*
Years	Team	Apps	(Gls)
2003–2006	Zimbru-2 Chişinău	37	(24)
2003–2006	Zimbru Chişinău	10	(0)
2007–2013	Vaslui	81	(3)
Total		133	(27)

International career^{‡}
2007–2011	Moldova	20	(1)

Managerial career
- 2016–2017: Milsami Orhei (fitness coach)
- 2017–2019: Politehnica Iași (fitness coach)
- 2019–2020: Ararat-Armenia (fitness coach)
- 2020: Noah (fitness coach)
- 2020–2022: Akron Tolyatti (fitness coach)
- 2022–2023: Sheriff Tiraspol (fitness coach)
- 2023–2025: Ararat-Armenia (fitness coach)
- 2025–: Moldova (fitness coach)
- * Club domestic league appearances and goals as of 6 June 2014 ‡ National team caps and goals as of 22 November 2013

Denis Zmeu (born 8 May 1985) is a former Moldovan footballer who played as a central midfielder. He is the current fitness coach of the Moldova national team.

From 24 August 2015 he is a coach for the physical training of all Moldavian football selections. From February 2016 to June 2017 he is a physical trainer at Milsami Orhei. Since June 2017 he has been a physical trainer at Politehnica Iași, the team for the first time in the 2017–2018 season qualifying in the play-off phase of the first league in Romania.

== Club career ==
He started his career at Zimbru Chișinău. In the winter of 2007, he was bought by SC Vaslui for about €200,000. In that season he played every single game, but he failed to impress. He scored his first goal for SC Vaslui, in a 3–0 victory against FC Timişoara.

== International career ==
Soon after his transfer at SC Vaslui, he made his debut in the Moldova national team. He was a regular, until the last year, when, because he failed to play at Vaslui, he lost his place in the national team.

== Career statistics ==
Club	Season	League		Cup		Europe		Other		Total	
Club	Season	Apps	Goals	Apps	Goals	Apps	Goals	Apps	Goals	Apps	Goals
Zimbru Chişinău	2003–04	2	0	0	0	0	0	0	0	2	0
Zimbru Chişinău	2004–05	1	0	0	0	0	0	0	0	1	0
Zimbru Chişinău	2005–06	6	0	0	0	0	0	0	0	6	0
Zimbru Chişinău	2006–07	1	0	0	0	0	0	0	0	1	0
Total		10	0	0	0	0	0	0	0	10	0
SC Vaslui	2006–07	15	0	0	0	0	0	0	0	15	0
SC Vaslui	2007–08	18	1	1	0	0	0	0	0	19	1
SC Vaslui	2008–09	17	1	4	0	3	0	0	0	24	1
SC Vaslui	2009–10	13	0	4	0	3	0	0	0	20	0
SC Vaslui	2010–11	4	0	1	0	0	0	0	0	5	0
SC Vaslui	2011–12	14	1	2	0	5	1	0	0	21	2
Total		81	3	12	0	11	1	0	0	104	4
Career Total		91	3	12	0	11	1	0	0	114	4

Statistics accurate as of match played 20 December 2011.

=== International goals ===
Scores and results list Moldova's goal tally first.

No	Date	Venue	Opponent	Score	Result	Competition
1.	11 October 2011	Zimbru Stadium, Chișinău, Moldova	San Marino	1–0	4–0	UEFA Euro 2012 qualification

== Career honours ==
=== SC Vaslui ===
- Cupa României
  - Runner-up: 2010
- UEFA Intertoto Cup
  - Winner: 2008

Campionatul Armeniei Campion Ararat-Armenia 2019-2020

Campionatul Moldovei Campion Petrocub 2025-2026
