= Aleksandar Madžar (soccer) =

Montenegrin footballer (born 1978)

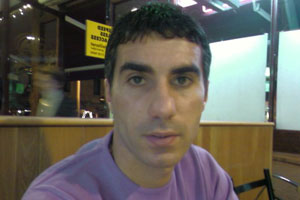

Personal information
- Full name: Aleksandar Madžar
- Date of birth: 21 August 1978 (age 48)
- Place of birth: Bar, SFR Yugoslavia
- Height: 6 ft 2 in (1.88 m)
- Position: Striker

Senior career*
Years	Team	Apps	(Gls)
1994–1995	Mornar		
1995–2002	Red Star Belgrade	0	(0)
1996	→ Palilulac Beograd (loan)	8	(0)
1997	→ OFK Kikinda (loan)	29	(0)
1998	→ Ferencváros (loan)	0	(0)
1999	→ Radnički Kragujevac (loan)	9	(1)
1999–2000	→ Hajduk Beograd (loan)	8	(0)
2000–2001	→ Radnički Niš (loan)	7	(1)
2001–2002	→ BSK Batajnica (loan)	21	(6)
2002	Mornar	15	(3)
2002–2003	Borac Čačak	8	(1)
2003	→ Radnički Kragujevac (loan)	15	(2)
2004	AEP Paphos	16	(5)
2005	Zagłębie Sosnowiec	7	(1)
2005–2006	Voždovac	1	(0)
2006	Vaslui	8	(0)
2006–2008	Sliema Wanderers	27	(11)
2008	Marsaxlokk	12	(6)
2008–2009	Floriana	12	(2)
2009–2010	Mornar	17	(5)
2010–2011	Mogren	0	(0)

Managerial career
- 2018: Bokelj
- 2018: Mornar
- * Club domestic league appearances and goals

Aleksandar Madžar (Cyrillic: Александар Маџар; born 21 August 1978) is a Montenegrin professional football manager and former player who played as a footballer.
