= Răzvan Neagu =

Romanian footballer

Personal information
- Date of birth: 25 May 1987 (age 39)
- Place of birth: Bacău, Romania
- Height: 1.82 m (6 ft 0 in)
- Position: Striker

Team information
- Current team: Vointa

Youth career
- FCM Bacău

Senior career*
Years	Team	Apps	(Gls)
2005–2006	FCM Bacău	25	(1)
2006–2012	Vaslui	46	(2)
2009	→ FCM Bacău (loan)	10	(3)
2009	→ Gloria Bistriţa (loan)	5	(0)
2012	→ Petrolul Ploieşti (loan)	4	(0)
2012	→ CS Turnu Severin (loan)	1	(0)
2012	→ CSU Vointa Sibiu (loan)	1	(0)

International career^{‡}
2007–2008	Romania U21	2	(0)
- * Club domestic league appearances and goals as of 24 October 2011 ‡ National team caps and goals as of 7 May 2008

Răzvan Neagu (born 25 May 1987) is a Romanian former football player.

== Statistics ==
Club	Season	League		Cup		Europe		Other		Total	
Club	Season	Apps	Goals	Apps	Goals	Apps	Goals	Apps	Goals	Apps	Goals
SC Vaslui	2006–07	22	2	0	0	0	0	0	0	22	2
SC Vaslui	2007–08	9	0	1	0	0	0	0	0	10	0
SC Vaslui	2008–09	3	0	1	0	0	0	0	0	4	0
SC Vaslui	2009–10	8	0	2	0	0	0	0	0	10	0
SC Vaslui	2010–11	2	0	0	0	0	0	0	0	2	0
SC Vaslui	2011–12	2	0	2	0	3	0	0	0	7	0
Total		46	2	6	0	3	0	0	0	55	2

Statistics accurate as of 1 November 2011

== Career honours ==
=== SC Vaslui ===
- Cupa României
  - Runner-up: 2010
- UEFA Intertoto Cup
  - Winner: 2008
