= Mihai Luca =

Romanian footballer

Personal information
- Date of birth: 17 March 1988 (age 38)
- Place of birth: Suceava, Romania
- Position: Goalkeeper

Youth career
- Cetatea Suceava

Senior career*
Years	Team	Apps	(Gls)
2005–2006	Cetatea Suceava	14	(0)
2007–2012	Vaslui	1	(0)
2008–2009	→ Cetatea Suceava (loan)	31	(0)
2012	→ CSM Paşcani (loan)		
- * Club domestic league appearances and goals as of 4 June 2011

Mihai Luca (born 17 March 1988) is a Romanian football goalkeeper who played in Liga I for Vaslui.
