= Șerban Moraru =

Romanian footballer and manager

Personal information
- Date of birth: 9 February 1986 (age 40)
- Place of birth: Brașov, Romania
- Height: 1.82 m (6 ft 0 in)
- Position: Right-back

Team information
- Current team: FC Brașov (sporting director)

Youth career
- 1994–2000: CSȘ Brașovia
- 2000–2004: Brașov

Senior career*
Years	Team	Apps	(Gls)
2004–2005	Forex Brașov	33	(8)
2005–2006	Rapid II București	10	(0)
2006–2008	FC Vaslui	18	(0)
2009	Astra Ploiești	0	(0)
2010	Râmnicu Vâlcea	13	(0)
2010–2012	Bihor Oradea	21	(0)
2012–2016	FC Brașov	41	(1)
2016–2017	AFC Hărman	37	(0)
2017–2018	Colțea Brașov		
2018–2020	Olimpic Cetate Râșnov	36	(2)
2020–	SR Brașov	12	(1)
Total		221	(12)

Managerial career
- 2017–2018: Colțea Brașov
- 2020: SR Brașov (assistant)
- * Club domestic league appearances and goals as of 06:11, 3 August 2021 (UTC)

Șerban Moraru (born 9 February 1986) is a Romanian former footballer who played as a right back for teams such as Forex Brașov, Bihor Oradea, FC Brașov (1936) or Olimpic Cetate Râșnov, among others . His brother is TV host Radu Moraru.
