= Dorian Andronic =

Romanian former football player (born 1999)

Personal information
- Full name: Dorian Andronic
- Date of birth: 16 October 1989 (age 37)
- Place of birth: Suceava, Romania
- Height: 1.88 m (6 ft 2 in)
- Position: Defender

Youth career
- Cetatea Suceava

Senior career*
Years	Team	Apps	(Gls)
2005–2006	Cetatea Suceava	10	(0)
2007–2011	Vaslui	26	(1)
2010	→ CS Otopeni (loan)	2	(0)
2011–2012	Sporting Suceava	21	(1)
- * Club domestic league appearances and goals as of 1 June 2012

Dorian Andronic (born 16 October 1989) is a Romanian former football player. He started as a center back at Cetatea Suceava when he was 16 years old. In the winter of 2007 he was bought by SC Vaslui. He made his debut in Liga I in a 1–0 victory against FC Steaua București. He scored his first goal against FC Timişoara in the 2007/2008 season. He didn't improve as much as it were expected, as he played only 5 games in the last season.

== Career honours ==
=== FC Vaslui ===
- UEFA Intertoto Cup
  - Winner: 2008
