= Marius Doboș =

Romanian footballer

Personal information
- Full name: Marius Iulian Doboș
- Date of birth: 29 December 1980 (age 45)
- Place of birth: Bacău, Romania
- Position: Midfielder

Team information
- Current team: Dinamo Bacău

Senior career*
Years	Team	Apps	(Gls)
2005–2006	FCM Bacău	27	(2)
2006–2010	FC Vaslui	32	(0)
2008–2010	→ FCM Bacău (loan)	46	(9)
2010–2012	FCM Bacău	21	(7)
2012–2014	Aerostar Bacău	28	(9)
2015–2016	Voința Ion Creangă	18	(8)
2016–2017	Teiul Poiana Teiului	12	(4)
2017–2018	Gauss Bacău	14	(5)
2019–2020	Dinamo Bacău	12	(3)
Total		210	(47)
- * Club domestic league appearances and goals as of 5 July 2020

Marius Iulian Doboș (born 29 December 1980) is a Romanian footballer who plays as a midfielder for Liga IV side Dinamo Bacău. In his career, Doboș also played for teams such as FCM Bacău, FC Vaslui or Aerostar Bacău, among others.

== Career at FCM Bacau & SC Vaslui ==
Club	Season	Domestic League		Domestic Cups		Continental games		Total
Club	Season	App	Goals	App	Goals	App	Goals	App	Goals
FCM Bacău	10–11	21	7	2	0	0	0	23	7
FCM Bacău	09–10	20	5	1	0	0	0	21	5
FCM Bacău	08–09	26	4	1	0	0	0	27	4
	05–06	27	2	0	0	0	0	27	2
	Total	94	18	4	0	0	0	98	18
SC Vaslui	07–08	5	0	1	0	0	0	6	0
SC Vaslui	06–07	27	0	1	0	0	0	28	0
SC Vaslui	Total	32	0	2	0	0	0	34	0
Career Totals		126	18	6	0	0	0	132	18
Last updated 23 July 2011
