= Daniel Sabou =

Romanian footballer

Dănuț Sabou
Personal information
- Date of birth: 4 November 1979 (age 46)
- Place of birth: Baia Mare, Romania
- Height: 1.75 m (5 ft 9 in)
- Position: Midfielder

Youth career
- FC Baia Mare

Senior career*
Years	Team	Apps	(Gls)
1998–2002	FC Baia Mare	37	(1)
2002–2004	Gloria Bistrița	12	(0)
2004–2005	Oașul Negrești	11	(0)
2005	Unirea Dej	10	(1)
2005–2006	Unirea Alba Iulia	14	(1)
2006–2008	FC Vaslui	42	(4)
2008–2009	Gloria Bistrița	4	(1)
2009–2012	Sporting Recea		

Managerial career
- 2012–: Sporting Recea
- * Club domestic league appearances and goals as of 21 June 2016 ‡ National team caps and goals as of 3 March 2010

Dănuț Sabou (born 4 November 1979 in Baia Mare) is a former Romanian football player. He played as a central defensive midfielder and is currently the manager of Sporting Recea.
