= Marius Croitoru =

Romanian footballer (born 1980)

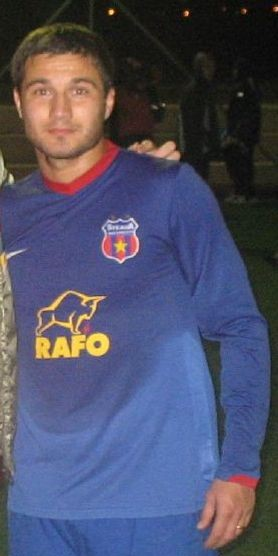
- Croitoru after a game with Steaua București

Personal information
- Full name: Marius Marian Croitoru
- Date of birth: 2 October 1980 (age 46)
- Place of birth: Giurgiu, Romania
- Height: 1.75 m (5 ft 9 in)
- Position: Right winger

Team information
- Current team: Botoșani (head coach)

Youth career
- –1998: Inter Dunărea Giurgiu

Senior career*
Years	Team	Apps	(Gls)
1998–1999	Inter Dunărea Giurgiu		
1999–2000	Turistul Pantelimon	23	(2)
2000–2005	FCM Bacău	111	(7)
2006	Vaslui	32	(6)
2007–2008	Steaua București	22	(0)
2008	→ Ceahlăul Piatra Neamț (loan)	14	(0)
2009	FCM Bacău	3	(1)
2009	Politehnica Iași	1	(0)
2010	Atyrau	27	(4)
2011	Astra Ploiești	8	(0)
2012	FCM Bacău	11	(1)
2012–2015	Botoșani	86	(8)
2015–2018	ACS Poli Timișoara	64	(2)
2018	CSM Pașcani	1	(0)
Total		403	(31)

International career
2001	Romania U21	1	(0)

Managerial career
- 2019–2022: Botoșani
- 2022: FC U Craiova
- 2022–2023: Argeș Pitești
- 2023: Botoșani
- 2024: FC U Craiova
- 2026–: Botoșani
- * Club domestic league appearances and goals

Marius Marian Croitoru (born 2 October 1980) is a Romanian professional football manager and former player, who is currently in charge of Liga I club Botoșani.

He played as a right winger and possessed a powerful shot and good ball technique.

== Club career ==
Croitoru made his professional debut in a second division game for Turistul București. In 2000, he moved to Liga I club FCM Bacău.

After six seasons with FCM Bacău, Croitoru moved to fellow first league club FC Vaslui, where he impressed alongside Viorel Frunză.

In January 2007, after some impressive displays for Vaslui, he was transferred by Steaua București. After only one season, he was loaned to Ceahlăul Piatra Neamț.

== Managerial career ==
=== Botoșani ===
In the summer of 2019, although still not in possession of a UEFA Pro Licence, Croitoru was appointed as head coach of Liga I club Botoșani. In his third game in charge, he managed a historic 2–0 away win against FCSB.

=== FC U Craiova ===
On 23 June 2022, Croitoru was appointed as head coach of Liga I club FC U Craiova, agreeing to a two-year contract. On 10 October 2022, Croitoru was released of duty from FC U Craiova, after losing 1–0 against Chindia Târgoviște on the same day.

=== Argeș Pitești ===
On 26 October 2022, Croitoru was appointed as head coach of Liga I club Argeș Pitești, agreeing to a one-and-a-half-year contract.

== Personal life ==
His son, David Croitoru is a football player who made his debut in professional football for Botoșani under the guidance of Marius.

== Career statistics ==
Appearances and goals by club, season and competition
Club	Season	League			National cup (Note: Includes Cupa României, Kazakhstan Cup)		League cup (Note: Includes Cupa Ligii)		Europe		Other		Total	
Club	Season	Division	Apps	Goals	Apps	Goals	Apps	Goals	Apps	Goals	Apps	Goals	Apps	Goals
Dunărea Giurgiu	1998–99	Divizia C	?	?	?	?	—		—		—		?	?
Turistul Pantelimon	1999–00	Divizia C	23	2	?	?	—		—		—		23	2
FCM Bacău	2000–01	Divizia A	19	0	1	0	—		—		—		20	0
FCM Bacău	2001–02	Divizia A	11	2	0	0	—		—		—		11	2
FCM Bacău	2002–03	Divizia A	16	3	1	0	—		—		—		17	3
FCM Bacău	2003–04	Divizia A	25	0	0	0	—		—		—		25	0
FCM Bacău	2004–05	Divizia A	25	0	2	0	—		—		—		27	0
FCM Bacău	2005–06	Divizia A	15	2	2	1	—		—		—		17	3
FCM Bacău	Total		111	7	6	1	—		—		—		117	8
Vaslui	2005–06	Divizia A	14	2	—		—		—		—		14	2
Vaslui	2006–07	Liga I	18	4	1	0	—		—		—		19	4
Vaslui	Total		32	6	1	0	—		—		—		33	6
Steaua București	2006–07	Liga I	10	0	0	0	—		2 (Note: Appearances in UEFA Cup)	0	–		12	0
Steaua București	2007–08	Liga I	12	0	1	0	—		8 (Note: Appearances in UEFA Champions League)	0	—		21	0
Steaua București	2008–09	Liga I	0	0	0	0	—		0	0	—		0	0
Steaua București	Total		22	0	1	0	—		10	0	—		33	0
Ceahlăul Piatra Neamț (loan)	2007–08	Liga I	14	0	—		—		—		—		14	0
FCM Bacău	2008–09	Liga II	3	1	—		—		—		—		3	1
Politehnica Iași	2009–10	Liga I	1	0	1	0	—		—		—		2	0
Atyrau	2010	Kazakhstan Premier League	27	4	2	1	—		1 (Note: Appearances in UEFA Europa League)	0	—		30	5
Astra Ploiești	2010–11	Liga I	8	0	—		—		—		—		8	0
FCM Bacău	2011–12	Liga II	11	1	—		—		—		—		11	1
Botoșani	2012–13	Liga II	21	2	2	0	—		—		—		23	2
Botoșani	2013–14	Liga I	30	1	0	0	—		—		—		30	1
Botoșani	2014–15	Liga I	31	3	0	0	1	0	—		—		32	3
Botoșani	2015–16	Liga I	4	2	—		—		4	0	—		8	2
Botoșani	Total		86	8	2	0	1	0	4	0	–		93	8
ACS Poli Timișoara	2015–16	Liga I	13	0	2	0	1	0	—		—		16	0
ACS Poli Timișoara	2016–17	Liga I	35	2	2	0	4	2	—		2 (Note: Appearances in Liga I relegation/promotion play-offs)	0	43	4
ACS Poli Timișoara	2017–18	Liga I	16	0	1	0	—		—		—		17	0
ACS Poli Timișoara	Total		64	2	5	0	5	2	—		2	0	76	4
CSM Pașcani	2018–19	Liga III	1	0	—		—		—		—		1	0
Career total			403	31	18	2	6	2	15	0	2	0	444	35

== Managerial statistics ==
As of 1 November 2026

Managerial record by team and tenure
Team	From	To	Record							
Team	From	To	G	W	D	L	GF	GA	GD	Win %
Botoșani	4 June 2019	14 June 2022	124	48	37	39	159	141	+18	38.71
FC U Craiova	23 June 2022	10 October 2022	14	5	3	6	18	14	+4	35.71
Argeș Pitești	26 October 2022	7 March 2023	16	2	8	6	12	22	−10	12.50
Botoșani	16 June 2023	17 August 2023	5	0	2	3	4	7	−3	0.00
FC U Craiova	28 May 2024	22 October 2024	11	3	6	2	9	10	−1	27.27
Botoșani	10 March 2026	Present	27	7	9	11	39	44	−5	25.93
Total			197	65	65	67	241	238	+3	32.99

== Honours ==
=== Player ===
Botoșani

- Liga II: 2012–13

ACS Poli Timișoara

- Cupa Ligii runner-up: 2016–17
