= Bogdan Buhuș =

Romanian footballer

Bogdan Buhuş
Personal information
- Date of birth: 30 October 1979 (age 47)
- Place of birth: Bârlad, Romania
- Height: 1.78 m (5 ft 10 in)
- Positions: Centre-back; right-back

Senior career*
| Years | Team | Apps | (Gls) |
| 1997–2000 | Petrolul Moinești | 48 | (1) |
| 2000–2003 | UTA Arad | 50 | (2) |
| 2003–2004 | Jiul Petroşani | 28 | (2) |
| 2004–2005 | Universitatea Craiova | 26 | (1) |
| 2005–2010 | Vaslui | 125 | (0) |
| 2010–2011 | Universitatea Cluj | 19 | (0) |
| Total | | 296 | (6) |
- * Club domestic league appearances and goals as of 21 May 2011

Bogdan Constantin Buhuş (born 30 October 1979) is a retired Romanian football defender. He is mostly known for his five-year spell at Vaslui, where he activated as team captain until his departure. Buhuş held the record for most appearances for Vaslui (144), before being surpassed by Mike Temwanjera.

== Career ==
Born in Bârlad, Vaslui, Buhuş began his career with Petrolul Moineşti, when Petrolul were in Divizia B. He became a regular in the first team, playing 43 matches during his first two years. He lost his place from the squad during the 1999–2000 season, playing only 5 matches. Buhuş scored his only goal for Petrolul Moineşti on 21 August 1999 in a 2–0 victory against Poli Iaşi. He was released at the end of the season.

In 2000, he went on trial in Italy's amateur leagues where he was spotted, accidentally, by UTA Arad manager Francisc Tisza. He scored his first goal for UTA on 16 September in a 3–0 win against Pandurii Târgu Jiu. He was a utility player during his spell at UTA, playing as a right back, centre back and right midfielder. Buhuş played a significant role in the 2001–02 season as UTA secured promotion to the top-flight for the first time since 1995. He also scored one goal during the season against Jiul Petroşani on 17 November 2001. He made his Divizia A debut on 15 September 2002 in a 0–2 home defeat against Sportul Studenţesc. He failed to make an impact, playing only once in the season, in which UTA eventually dropped back to the second division.

He spent one year at Jiul Petroşani during 2003–04.

In June 2004, Buhuş went on a trial with Divizia A side Universitatea Craiova. He signed a three-year contract with Universitatea Craiova on 30 June. He made his unofficial debut for Craiova on 9 July in a friendly match against LASK Linz coming in as a substitute for Aurelian Dumitru at the half-time. Buhuş made his league debut for Craiova against Gaz Metan Mediaş on 1 August, being handed the no. 15 jersey. On 11 September, during a match against CFR Cluj, Craiova came back from a two-goal deficit to win the match with 3–2, with Buhuş scoring the equalizer.

In the summer of 2005, he was signed for new promoted team SC Vaslui. He was one of the best players, in the first season, and he was also one of the 7 players who were confirmed and in the next season. In October 2006, he was named captain by Gheorghe Multescu. At the beginning of 2007/2008 season, there were rumours that he would retire from football, but he said that he would like to fulfill his contract. In the same year, he lost his captaincy for Sorin Frunza and Bogdan Panait, but in the end of the season, he was once again the captain of the team. The season 2008/2009 started with him captain, but because of a conflict with the team coach, Viorel Hizo, the captaincy was taken. When Cristian Dulca was named manager, he was again the captain of the team. Because of a knee injury he missed the entire second part of the 2009–2010 season.

On 7 July 2010, he released his contract with SC Vaslui.

== Statistics ==
| Club | Season | League | | Cup | | Europe | | Total | |
| Club | Season | Apps | Goals | Apps | Goals | Apps | Goals | Apps | Goals |
|---|---|---|---|---|---|---|---|---|---|
| Petrolul Moineşti | 1997–98 | 16 | 0 | | | — | | 16 | 0 |
| Petrolul Moineşti | 1998–99 | 27 | 0 | | | — | | 27 | 0 |
| Petrolul Moineşti | 1999–00 | 5 | 1 | | | — | | 5 | 1 |
| Total | | 48 | 1 | | | 0 | 0 | 48 | 1 |
| UTA Arad | 2000–01 | 25 | 1 | | | — | | 25 | 1 |
| UTA Arad | 2001–20 | 24 | 1 | | | — | | 24 | 1 |
| UTA Arad | 2002–03 | 1 | 0 | 0 | 0 | — | | 1 | 0 |
| Total | | 50 | 2 | | | 0 | 0 | 50 | 2 |
| Jiul Petroșani | 2003–04 | 28 | 2 | 1 | 0 | — | | 29 | 2 |
| Total | | 28 | 2 | 1 | 0 | 0 | 0 | 29 | 2 |
| Universitatea Craiova | 2004–05 | 26 | 1 | 5 | 0 | — | | 31 | 1 |
| Total | | 26 | 1 | 5 | 0 | 0 | 0 | 31 | 1 |
| Vaslui | 2005–06 | 26 | 0 | 2 | 0 | — | | 28 | 0 |
| Vaslui | 2006–07 | 29 | 0 | 1 | 0 | — | | 30 | 0 |
| Vaslui | 2007–08 | 27 | 0 | 0 | 0 | — | | 27 | 0 |
| Vaslui | 2008–09 | 27 | 0 | 4 | 0 | 6 | 0 | 37 | 0 |
| Vaslui | 2009–10 | 16 | 0 | 3 | 0 | 3 | 0 | 21 | 0 |
| Total | | 125 | 0 | 10 | 0 | 9 | 0 | 144 | 0 |
| Universitatea Cluj | 2010–11 | 19 | 0 | 1 | 0 | — | | 20 | 0 |
| Total | | 19 | 0 | 1 | 0 | 0 | 0 | 20 | 0 |
| Career Total | | 296 | 6 | 17 | 0 | 9 | 0 | 332 | 6 |

== Career honours ==
=== SC Vaslui ===
- UEFA Intertoto Cup
  - Winner: 2008

Sporting positions
| Preceded by Gabriel Cânu | FC Vaslui captain 2009–2010 | Succeeded by Miloš Pavlović |
