= Milorad Bukvić =

Serbian footballer

Personal information
- Date of birth: 11 June 1976 (age 50)
- Place of birth: Bačka Palanka, SFR Yugoslavia
- Height: 1.92 m (6 ft 3 1/2 in)
- Position: Striker

Youth career
- Vojvodina

Senior career*
Years	Team	Apps	(Gls)
1997–1998	Cement Beočin		
1998–1999	Novi Sad		
1999–2000	Vojvodina	10	(3)
2000–2001	Oțelul Galați	26	(8)
2001–2003	Argeș Pitești	20	(2)
2003–2004	Slovan Bratislava	17	(3)
2004–2005	Artmedia Bratislava	17	(0)
2005–2008	Vaslui	61	(8)
2008–2009	Cetatea Suceava	8	(1)
2009	Petržalka 1898	0	(0)
2010	Dacia Mioveni	7	(1)
- * Club domestic league appearances and goals

Milorad Bukvić (Serbian Cyrillic: Милорад Буквић; born 11 June 1976) is a Serbian retired footballer who played as a striker.

== Honours ==
Artmedia Bratislava

- Slovak Superliga: 2004–05
- Slovak Super Cup: 2005
