= Viorel Frunză =

Moldovan footballer

Personal information
- Date of birth: 6 December 1979 (age 46)
- Place of birth: Chișinău, Moldavian SSR, Soviet Union
- Height: 1.90 m (6 ft 3 in)
- Position: Striker

Youth career
- Agro Chișinău

Senior career*
Years	Team	Apps	(Gls)
1996–2000	Agro Chișinău	61	(14)
2000–2004	Zimbru Chișinău	97	(26)
2004–2006	Vaslui	43	(17)
2006	→ Dacia Chișinău (loan)	5	(2)
2007–2009	CFR Cluj	7	(0)
2007	→ Ceahlăul Piatra Neamț (loan)	15	(4)
2008	→ PAOK (loan)	4	(0)
2008	→ Spartak Nalchik (loan)	7	(0)
2009	Politehnica Iaşi	0	(0)
2010	Atyrau	26	(7)
2011	Neman Grodno	11	(3)
2011	Shakhter Karagandy	8	(0)
2012–2014	Veris Chișinău	67	(54)
2015	Dacia Chișinău	9	(4)
Total		336	(131)

International career
2003–2015	Moldova	37	(7)

Managerial career
- 2016–2017: Academia Chișinău
- 2017: Dacia Chișinău
- 2018: Dinamo-Auto
- 2018: Dinamo-Auto (assistant)
- 2018–2019: Știința Miroslava
- 2020–2021: Ventspils
- 2022: Bălți (assistant)
- 2023–2025: Dacia Buiucani
- * Club domestic league appearances and goals

Viorel Frunză (born 6 December 1979) is a Moldovan football coach and a former striker.

== International goals ==
Scores and results list Moldova's goal tally first.

No	Date	Venue	Opponent	Score	Result	Competition
1.	7 June 2003	Stadionul Sheriff, Tiraspol, Moldova	Austria	1–0	1–0	Euro 2004 qualifier
2.	6 June 2007	Pankritio Stadium, Heraklion, Greece	Greece	1–1	1–2	Euro 2008 qualifier
3.	22 August 2007	Skonto Stadium, Riga, Latvia	Latvia	1–0	2–1	Friendly match
4.	13 October 2007	Zimbru Stadium, Chișinău, Moldova	Turkey	1–0	1–1	Euro 2008 qualifier
5	17 October 2007	Ta' Qali National Stadium, Ta' Qali, Malta	Malta	2–0	3–2	Euro 2008 qualifier
6	17 October 2007	Ta' Qali National Stadium, Ta' Qali, Malta	Malta	3–0	3–2	Euro 2008 qualifier
7.	11 October 2013	Zimbru Stadium, Chișinău, Moldova	San Marino	1–0	3–0	2014 World Cup qualifier

== Honours ==
- Zimbru Chişinău
  - Moldovan Cup: 2002–03, 2003–04
- Shakhter Karagandy
  - Kazakhstan Premier League: 2011
- FC Veris
  - Moldovan Third Division: 2011–12
  - Moldovan Second Division: 2012–13
