= Laurențiu Ivan =

Romanian footballer and manager

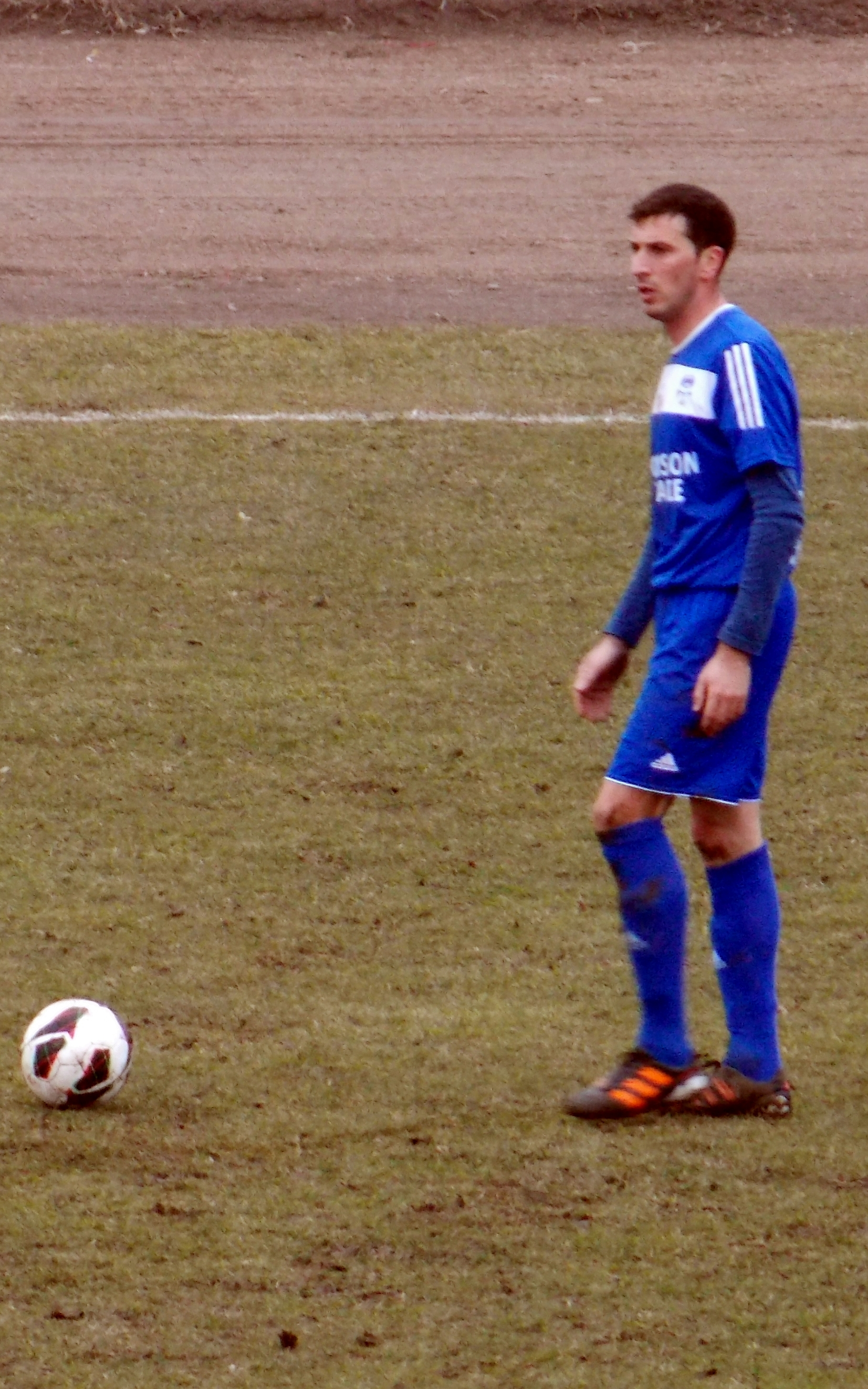

Personal information
- Full name: Laurențiu Marin Ivan
- Date of birth: 8 May 1979 (age 47)
- Place of birth: Brăila, Romania
- Height: 1.82 m (6 ft 0 in)
- Position: Defender

Youth career
- Dacia Unirea Brăila

Senior career*
Years	Team	Apps	(Gls)
1996–2001	Dacia Unirea Brăila	69	(4)
2002–2003	FC Onești	49	(1)
2004	Petrolul Moinești	11	(1)
2004–2006	CF Brăila	54	(1)
2006–2008	Vaslui	39	(1)
2008–2011	Otopeni	45	(0)
2011–2018	Dacia Unirea Brăila	171	(3)
Total		438	(11)

Managerial career
- 2017: Dacia Unirea Brăila (assistant)
- 2018: Dacia Unirea Brăila (assistant)
- 2019–2020: Viitorul Ianca
- 2021–2022: Dacia Unirea Brăila
- * Club domestic league appearances and goals as of 10:51, 22 June 2022 (UTC)

Laurențiu Marin Ivan (born 8 May 1979) is a Romanian former professional footballer who played as a defender and currently a manager. Ivan started and ended his footballer career at Dacia Unirea Brăila, club for which he played in 294 league matches and scored 8 goals. He also played for teams such as: FC Onești, Petrolul Moinești, FC Vaslui or CS Otopeni.
