= Adrian Gheorghiu =

Romanian footballer

Personal information
- Full name: Adrian Ion Gheorghiu
- Date of birth: 30 November 1981 (age 44)
- Place of birth: Roman, Romania
- Height: 1.75 m (5 ft 9 in)
- Position: Left midfielder

Team information
- Current team: Viitorul Curița

Youth career
- LPS Vaslui

Senior career*
Years	Team	Apps	(Gls)
2000–2002	Laminorul Roman	15	(0)
2002–2003	Rafinăria Dărmăneşti	?	(?)
2003–2004	Petrolul Moineşti	28	(5)
2004–2006	FCM Bacău	57	(5)
2006–2013	Vaslui	119	(9)
2013–2015	Ceahlăul Piatra Neamţ	72	(2)
2016–2017	SC Bacău	11	(1)
2017	Aerostar Bacău	?	(?)
2018–	Viitorul Curița	?	(?)
- * Club domestic league appearances and goals as of 22 January 2018

Adrian Ion Gheorghiu (born 30 November 1981) is a Romanian professional footballer who plays for Liga IV-Bacău County side Viitorul Curița. He is right footed and plays as a left winger, but lately he played as a right winger. He is a technical skilled player, one of the few Romanian players with this skills.

== Club career ==
He started his career in the 3rd Romanian division Laminorul Roman, where he played until 2002. He attracted interest, since then because of his skills. After a short spell in Dărmăneşti, he signed with the Liga II Romanian side Petrolul Moineşti, where he stayed for almost a year. He was one of the top scorers, and he brought attention from the Liga I teams.

=== FCM Bacău ===
He signed a four-year contract with FCM Bacău in the 2004 summer. He established himself quickly in the first team, because of his technique. He made his Liga I debut, on 1 August in a 1–0 win against Oţelul Galaţi. He scored his first goal, on 28 August in a 2–1 win against Romanian giant Rapid, scoring in the 83rd minute. He managed to play in almost all games that season, and scored two goals. In his second season in Liga I, he was one of the few players who managed to impress after a terrible season for his team, who finished the last in the table, with only 14 points.

=== SC Vaslui ===
After FCM Bacău's relegation, all the players were on the transfer list. Despite Gheorghiu's next destination supposed to be Ceahlăul, he eventually signed a four-year contract with SC Vaslui. The reported fee paid, is €500.000, fee paid for him, and for another FCM Bacău players such as: Doboş, Mardare, Apostol and Neagu. He made his debut for his new team on 29 July, in a 0–0 draw against U Craiova. He scored his first goal on 19 August, on a 3–1 loss against Steaua. His second goal, was right in the next Match Day, where he managed to bring three vital points for his team. He was the second top scorer for his team, with 7 goals. In the second season, because of the captain Frunză's comeback, Gheorghiu started playing on the right side. Even this season wasn't as good as the previous, he still was an important player for his team, who achieved its goal, qualifying for a European competition. His third season, started with Gheorghiu only as a substitute, because of Aliută's come in Vaslui. On 11 April, he had an incredible bad luck. After establishing himself in the first team, he suffered a knee injury, and he stayed out for almost six months. His comeback was on 13 December, when he substituted Gerlem in the 80th minute. Unfortunately for him, he suffered another injury, so he had to stay out for another four months. His comeback at the end of the season, was benefic for his team who finished 3rd in the table, this being the highest rank for a Moldavian club in Liga I. He also started in the first team, in the Romanian Cup final, where he lost it at the penalty shootout.

=== Statistics ===
Club	Season	League		Cup		Europe		Total	
Club	Season	Apps	Goals	Apps	Goals	Apps	Goals	Apps	Goals
Laminorul Roman	2000–01	7	0	0	0	0	0	7	0
Laminorul Roman	2001–02	8	0	0	0	0	0	8	0
Total		15	0	0	0	0	0	15	0
Petrolul Moineşti	2003–04	28	5	2	0	0	0	30	5
Total		27	5	2	0	0	0	29	5
FCM Bacãu	2004–05	28	2	2	0	0	0	30	2
FCM Bacãu	2005–06	29	3	2	0	0	0	31	3
Total		57	5	4	0	0	0	61	5
Vaslui	2006–07	30	7	1	0	0	0	31	7
Vaslui	2007–08	26	2	0	0	0	0	26	2
Vaslui	2008–09	17	0	3	1	4	0	24	1
Vaslui	2009–10	8	0	2	0	0	0	10	0
Vaslui	2010–11	18	0	1	0	1	0	20	0
Vaslui	2011–12	11	0	4	1	1	0	16	1
Vaslui	2012–13	1	0	1	0	0	0	2	0
Total		111	9	12	2	6	0	129	11
Ceahlăul	2012–13	11	1	0	0	0	0	11	1
Ceahlăul	2013–14	31	1	1	0	0	0	32	1
Ceahlăul	2014–15	22	0	2	0	0	0	24	0
Ceahlăul	2015–16	8	0	1	0	0	0	9	0
Total		72	2	4	0	0	0	76	2
SC Bacău	2015–16	1	0	0	0	0	0	1	0
Total		1	0	0	0	0	0	1	0
Career Total		284	21	22	2	6	0	312	23

Statistics accurate as of match played 27 February 2016

== Career honours ==
=== SC Vaslui ===
- Cupa României
  - Runner-up: 2010
- UEFA Intertoto Cup
  - Winner: 2008
