= Ștefan Apostol =

Romanian footballer

Ştefan Apostol
Personal information
- Date of birth: 17 October 1974 (age 52)
- Place of birth: Cucuteni, Romania
- Height: 1.67 m (5 ft 6 in)
- Position: Right back

Youth career
- Selena Bacău

Senior career*
Years	Team	Apps	(Gls)
1992–2000	FCM Bacău	69	(0)
1995	→ Acord Focșani (loan)	12	(1)
1995–1996	→ Cetatea Târgu Neamț (loan)	4	(0)
1997–1998	→ Rafinăria Dărmănești (loan)	?	(?)
1998–1999	→ Petrolul Moinești (loan)	29	(2)
2001	Rapid București	10	(0)
2001–2005	FCM Bacău	103	(1)
2005–2006	Digenis Morphou	21	(0)
2006–2008	FC Vaslui	52	(0)
2008	Aerostar Bacău	?	(?)
2009–2010	Botoșani	41	(1)
2010–2012	FCM Bacău	39	(1)
Total		380	(6)

Managerial career
- 2009: Botoșani (caretaker)
- * Club domestic league appearances and goals as of 1 July 2012

Ştefan Apostol (born 17 October 1974) is a Romanian former football player, who played most of his career for FCM Bacău.
