= Bogdan Panait =

Romanian footballer

Personal information
- Full name: Bogdan Vasile Panait
- Date of birth: 12 April 1983 (age 43)
- Place of birth: Ploiești, Romania
- Height: 1.89 m (6 ft 2 in)
- Position: Defender

Team information
- Current team: CSM Vaslui

Youth career
- Petrolul Ploiești

Senior career*
Years	Team	Apps	(Gls)
2001–2003	Petrolul Ploiești	9	(0)
2003–2006	Vaslui	74	(5)
2006	Steaua București	1	(0)
2007–2010	Vaslui	30	(3)
2009–2010	→ Otopeni (loan)	28	(1)
2010	→ Politehnica Iași (loan)	12	(1)
2011–2012	FC Tiraspol	26	(0)
2012	FC Cisnădie	6	(2)
2012	Otopeni	1	(0)
2013	Dunărea Galați	9	(0)
2013	Unirea Slobozia	0	(0)
2014	Dunărea Galați	18	(0)
2014–2015	Aris Limassol	17	(2)
2015–2016	Dunărea Călărași	45	(0)
2017	FK Csíkszereda		
2017	→ Odorheiu Secuiesc (loan)	13	(1)
2017–2018	ASIL Lysi	25	(1)
2018	Metaloglobus București	14	(0)
2019–2020	Slatina	2	(0)
2020–2021	CSM Vaslui		
2021–2022	Sporting Vaslui	10	(0)
2022–	CSM Vaslui	0	(0)

Managerial career
- 2021–2022: Sporting Vaslui (assistant)
- * Club domestic league appearances and goals as of 07:01, 21 June 2022 (UTC)

Bogdan Vasile Panait (born 12 April 1983) is a Romanian football player who plays as a defender for CSM Vaslui. In his career Panait played for various football clubs from Romania, among them: Petrolul Ploiești, FC Vaslui, Steaua București, Politehnica Iași, Dunărea Galați, Dunărea Călărași or Metaloglobus București, but he also played in Moldova for FC Tiraspol and in Cyprus for Aris Limassol or ASIL Lysi.

== Career ==
Panait made his professional debut in 2001 at Petrolul Ploieşti and also played between 2003 and 2006 for FC Vaslui. Despite being a fullback, Panait has a great scoring appetite. In the 2005/2006 he scored four goals in 26 league appearances. He was part of Steaua București's UEFA Champions League 2006–07 squad during 2006. In winter 2006, a trade between Steaua București and FC Vaslui took place: Marius Croitoru to Steaua București in exchange for Panait at FC Vaslui and a sum of money. In winter 2009, he was loaned to CS Otopeni, but he failed to avoid relegation with his team. He returned in the summer at FC Vaslui, but he is still on the transfer list. In August, he was loaned again to CS Otopeni, for a season. He returned in the 2010 summer, where he was released.

== Club statistics ==
As of 17 September 2016

Club	Season	League		Cup		Europe		Total	
Club	Season	Apps	Goals	Apps	Goals	Apps	Goals	Apps	Goals
Petrolul Ploiești	2001–02	1	0	0	0	-		1	0
Petrolul Ploiești	2002–03	8	0	0	0	-		8	0
Total		9	0	0	0	-	-	9	0
Vaslui	2003–04	20	0	0	0	-		20	0
Vaslui	2004–05	28	1	1	0	-		29	1
Vaslui	2005–06	26	4	1	0	-		27	4
Vaslui	2006–07	13	3	0	0	-		13	3
Vaslui	2007–08	12	0	1	0	-		13	0
Vaslui	2008–09	5	0	1	0	3	0	9	0
Total		104	8	4	0	3	0	111	8
Steaua București	2006–07	1	0	1	0	-		2	0
Otopeni (loan)	2008–09	9	0	0	0	-		9	0
Otopeni (loan)	2009–10	19	1	2	0	-		21	1
Total		28	1	2	0	0	0	30	1
Politehnica Iași (loan)	2010–11	12	1	0	0	-		12	1
Tiraspol	2010–11	14	0	0	0	-		14	0
Tiraspol	2011–12	12	0	1	0	-		13	0
Total		26	1	1	0	0	0	27	0
Cisnădie	2012–13	6	2	1	0	-		7	2
Otopeni	2012–13	1	0	0	0	-		1	0
Dunărea Galați	2012–13	9	0	0	0	-		9	0
Dunărea Galați	2013–14	18	0	0	0	-		18	0
Total		27	0	0	0	0	0	27	0
Unirea Slobozia	2013–14	0	0	1	0	-		1	0
Aris Limassol	2014–15	17	2	0	0	-		17	2
Dunărea Călărași	2015–16	29	0	1	0	-		30	0
Dunărea Călărași	2016–17	7	0	0	0	-		7	0
ASIL	2017–18	25	1	0	0	-		25	1
Total		78	3	2	0	0	0	37	0
Career Total		274	13	11	0	3	0	274	13

== Career honours ==
=== FC Vaslui ===
- UEFA Intertoto Cup
  - Winner: 2008
