= Ștefan Mardare =

Romanian footballer

Personal information
- Full name: Ștefan Adrian Mardare
- Date of birth: 3 December 1987 (age 38)
- Place of birth: Bacău, Romania
- Height: 1.82 m (6 ft 0 in)
- Position: Centre-back

Youth career
- FCM Bacău

Senior career*
Years	Team	Apps	(Gls)
2005–2006	FCM Bacău	5	(0)
2006–2008	FC Vaslui	45	(0)
2008–2011	Rapid București	24	(0)
2011–2012	Debrecen II	12	(0)
2012	Oțelul Galați	0	(0)
2013	Rapid București	7	(0)
2013–2014	Dinamo București II	12	(0)
2014	UTA Arad	5	(0)
2014–2015	Național Sebiș	0	(0)
2015–2016	Hunedoara	18	(0)
2016	Unirea Alba Iulia	10	(0)
2016–2018	Dunărea Călărași	22	(0)
2018	CSMȘ Reșița	2	(0)
2019–2020	Unirea Alba Iulia	15	(1)
2020	Hunedoara	3	(0)
2021	Unirea Alba Iulia	7	(0)
Total		186	(1)

International career
2007–2010	Romania U-21	14	(0)

Managerial career
- 2021–2022: Unirea Alba Iulia (assistant)
- * Club domestic league appearances and goals as of 14:10, 8 November 2022 (UTC)

Ștefan Adrian Mardare (born 3 December 1987) is a Romanian former footballer who played as a centre-back for teams such as FCM Bacău, FC Vaslui, Rapid București or Unirea Alba Iulia, among others.

He graduated from the FCM Bacău Academy. Then he made his debut for the senior team against Rapid București at 15 years of age. Leaving Bacău after relegation, he signed for F.C. Vaslui, where he became a first team regular.

Mardare was linked to Newcastle and Everton in 2007.

In September 2013, he signed a 3-year contract with Dinamo București, but he was getting reserve football because of poor fitness level.

== Honours ==
Debrecen

- Nemzeti Bajnokság I: 2011–12
- Magyar Kupa: 2011–12

Dunărea Călărași

- Liga II: 2017–18
