= FC Vaslui =

Association football club in Romania

- Full name: Fotbal Club Vaslui
- Nicknames: Galben-verzii (The Yellow-Greens); Vasluienii (The Vaslui People)
- Short name: Vaslui
- Founded: 2002
- Dissolved: 2014 (original club); 2018 (supporters' team)
- Ground: Municipal
- Capacity: 9,240
Home colours	Away colours	Third colours

Fotbal Club Vaslui, commonly known as FC Vaslui or simply Vaslui (Romanian pronunciation: [vasˈluj]), was a Romanian association football club based in Vaslui, Vaslui County. Founded in 2002, it played in Liga I from 2005 until 2014. Its colours were yellow and green, giving rise to the nickname Galben-verzii (the Yellow-Greens).

FC Vaslui rose from the third division to the top flight in three seasons. It finished runners-up in the 2011–12 Liga I, reached the 2010 Cupa României final and played in European competitions, including the 2011–12 UEFA Europa League group stage. Financial difficulties brought its top-flight participation to an end in 2014. A separate supporters' association subsequently established ASS FC Vaslui, also known as FC Vaslui 2002, which competed in the Vaslui County leagues until 2018. The two organisations should not be confused with the earlier Sportul Municipal Vaslui or the later CSM Vaslui.

== History ==
=== Football in Vaslui before 2002 ===
Football in Vaslui predates FC Vaslui by several decades. A team named 6 Martie Vaslui was established in 1950 and initially played in regional competitions. It later took the name Progresul Vaslui, with support from the local district economic enterprise. In the 1958–59 season, Progresul won the Iași regional championship, although it did not enter the national third division that year.

Other teams played in Vaslui during the same period. Locomotiva Vaslui represented railway workers, while Rapid Vaslui was associated with a local transport enterprise. Fulgerul PTTR Vaslui won the county competition in 1972–73 and contested a promotion play-off with Partizanul Bacău. These teams had their own identities and should not be included in Sportul Municipal's succession of names.

The club was renamed Viitorul Vaslui in 1968 after coming under the patronage of the city's furniture factory. It won the county championship in 1969–70 but lost the promotion play-off to Olimpia Râmnicu Sărat. A second county title in 1970–71 brought promotion to Divizia C, where Viitorul went on to win its series in 1972–73 and reach Divizia B. That first spell in the second tier lasted one season. Further Divizia C titles followed in 1974–75 and 1976–77, with the club returning to Divizia B each time.

Viitorul spent six successive seasons in Divizia B between 1977 and 1983. Its best finish during that period was fifth, in 1978–79. In 1982 the football team came under the control of the local mechanical works and was renamed Viitorul Mecanica; the name was shortened to Mecanica Vaslui the following year. Meanwhile, Inter Vaslui emerged as a local rival, and later competed under the Viitorul name. These were separate teams rather than successive names of one club.

In the early 1990s Mecanica was renamed Marvas Vaslui, then Sportul Municipal Vaslui. The latter spent much of the decade in the county leagues, with spells in Divizia C. Sportul Municipal was still active at the beginning of the 2000s and contested promotion with Politehnica Iași in 2001–02. FC Vaslui was formed later in 2002, following the relocation of Victoria Galați, and was not simply a renaming of Sportul Municipal.

Names used by the earlier Sportul Municipal club
Years	Name
1950–1960	6 Martie Vaslui
1960–1968	Progresul Vaslui
1968–1982	Viitorul Vaslui
1982–1983	Viitorul Mecanica Vaslui
1983–1991	Mecanica Vaslui
1991–1993	Marvas Vaslui
1993–2002	Sportul Municipal Vaslui

The dates above concern Sportul Municipal Vaslui, not FC Vaslui (founded in 2002).

=== First years and the fast ascension (2002–2007) ===
On 20 July 2002, the newly promoted Divizia C side Victoria Galați moved to Vaslui, after an agreement between Marius Stan and the Vaslui Municipality to use the Municipal Stadium. Ioan Sdrobiș was appointed as team manager, and the main squad was formed from Dunărea Galați players. The club also changed its name to Fotbal Club Vaslui (FC Vaslui). The club's main objective was to achieve the promotion to Divizia B.

Period	Name
2002–2014	FC Vaslui
2014–2018	ASS FC Vaslui

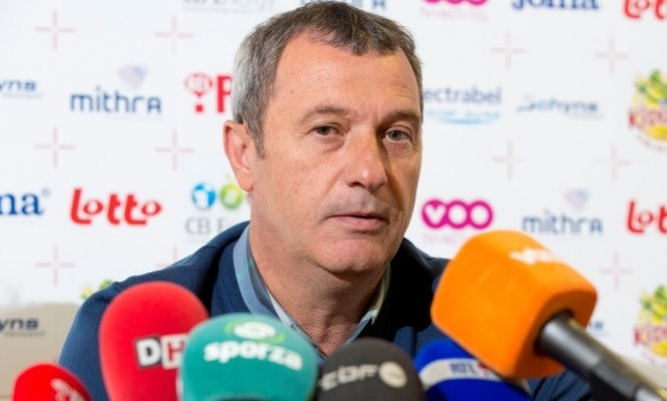
Mircea Rednic, the coach that saved FC Vaslui from relegation at its first top-flight season.

Soon after their foundation, Adrian Porumboiu, former referee, took over the club and immediately changed the colours of the team's strip from white and blue to yellow and green, the same as those used by his company, which worked in the agricultural field. At the end of the season, despite the achievement of promotion, Marius Stan, the club president, resigned and Adrian Porumboiu, the club owner, opted to stop sponsoring the team because of what he perceived as the Vaslui Municipality's lack of interest in the side. With an entirely new management team, the objective for the newly promoted Divizia B team was to avoid relegation. With a strong start to the season and with Adrian Porumboiu back at the club, the objective was changed from avoiding relegation to promotion to Divizia A. The club managed to secure promotion in the following season, setting a new record by being the club promoted to Divizia A in the quickest time, only three years after their foundation.

With his club in Divizia A, Adrian Porumboiu set an impressive budget for a newly promoted team in the top flight. Despite signing Claudiu Răducanu, Sabin Ilie, Nana Falemi and Cătălin Cursaru, Vaslui had a poor record in the top flight, failing to register a single victory by the end of the first part of the season. During the winter break, Mircea Rednic changed Vaslui's transfer policy. The club went on a solid run and had one of the best records for the second half of the season. However, the club was embroiled in controversy when they faced Steaua București on matchday 30. In order to secure the championship, Steaua had to win at Vaslui. Steaua duly won by four goals and therefore secured the league title, but Steaua's easy win was questioned not only by officials at Steaua's rivals Rapid București, but also by Adrian Porumboiu, who decided the following day to give up ownership of Vaslui. With no sponsorship and with no squad, the media speculated that Vaslui would sell its Divizia A spot, although the club president denied those rumours.

With a completely different team from the previous season, Vaslui had the same poor season start as before. Despite this, Vaslui finished eighth at the end of the campaign, the club's best performance at the time. Fortunes had changed markedly under new team manager Viorel Hizo, who has been appointed on 24 September, after Mulțescu was sacked. However, despite his solid performances, Hizo resigned at the end of the season because of Vaslui's poor infrastructure. Porumboiu, who had returned to the club after his earlier departure, opted to invest the club's budget in improving the crumbling infrastructure, instead of signing new players.

=== Years of glory, spectacular football (2007–2012) ===
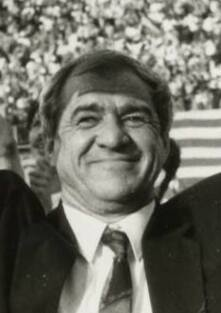
Viorel Hizo, the coach with the most time spent at FC Vaslui.

After Dorinel Munteanu was revealed as the new team manager, the main objective was set: qualification for European competition. The season was one with ups and downs for the Moldavian team, Vaslui securing the final spot for European competition thanks to the Court of Arbitration for Sport (CAS). Vaslui contested Oțelul Galați's decision to include two players, both of whom had been sent off in the previous matchday, in a league match between the two clubs. The CAS awarded Vaslui the three points and as a result, Vaslui finished in seventh position, ahead of Oțelul.

With his side in the UEFA Intertoto Cup, Adrian Porumboiu invested a significant amount of money in new players. Viorel Hizo had also been reinstated as the team manager. After defeating Azerbaijani club Neftçi, Vaslui qualified for the UEFA Cup, but failed to qualify for the group stage after they were eliminated by Slavia Prague on the away goals rule.

The championship was one with ups and downs for the team, Vaslui sitting in ninth place for almost the entire season. After a win against Universitatea Craiova in the final round, and thanks to the other results, Vaslui finished in fifth position to secure a spot in the UEFA Europa League for the second-straight year (the UEFA Cup rebranding as the UEFA Europa League for 2009–10). The team also reached the Cupa României semi-final, where they were beaten by CFR Cluj after a number of errors by the referee.

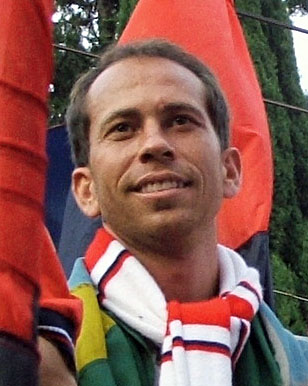
Adaílton: over his two seasons, was a Vaslui Player of the Year, a captain, and runner-up to teammate Wesley for Liga I Foreign Player of the Year

In its second season in the European competitions, despite winning in the first leg, Vaslui failed to qualify for the UEFA Europa League group stage for the second time, after they lost to AEK Athens. Despite its unsuccessful European season, Vaslui had an excellent domestic season, finishing third in the championship and reaching the Cupa României final.

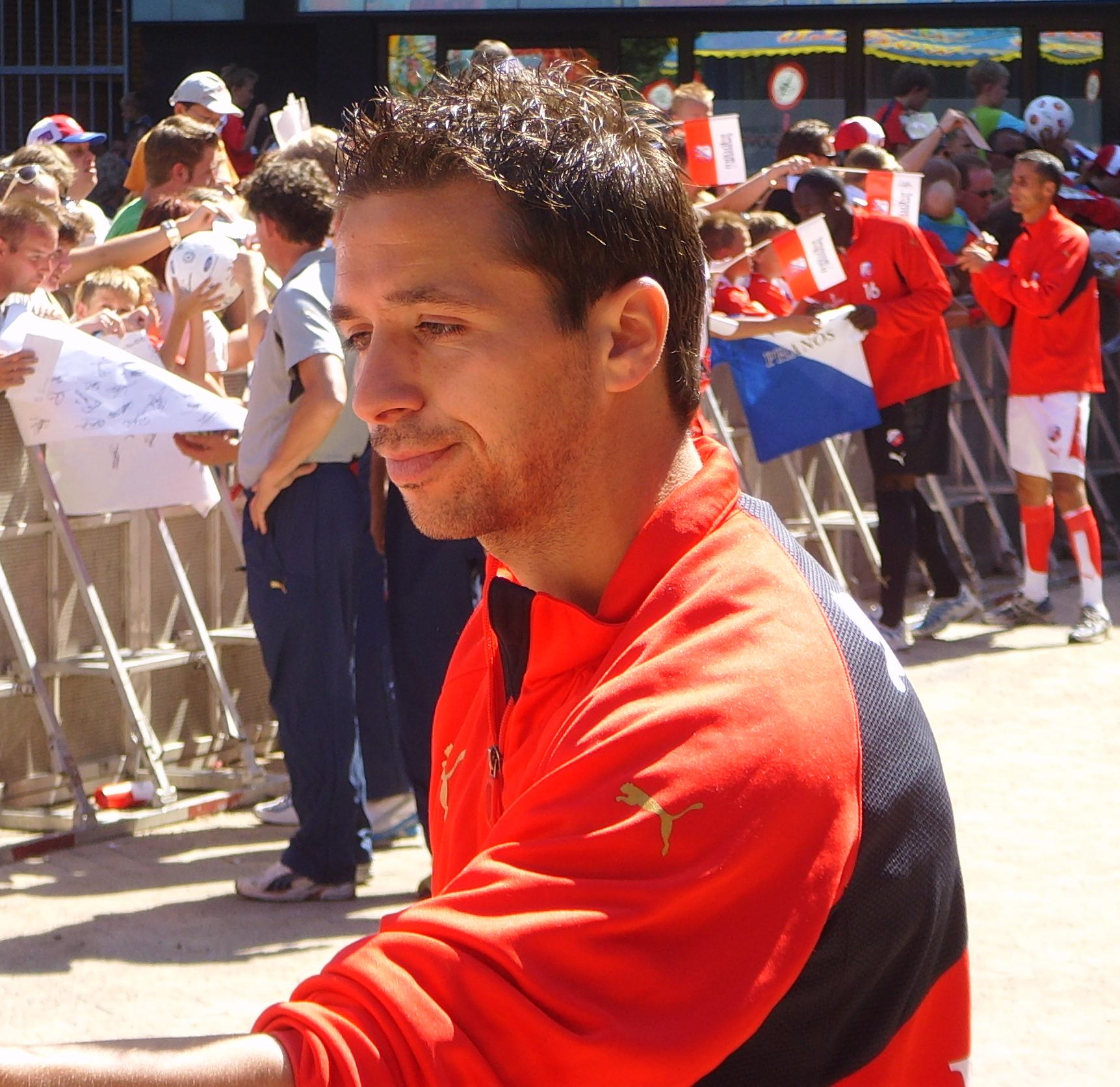
Lucian Sânmărtean joined the club in December 2009 and played until 2014. He helped Vaslui reach the 2009–10 Cupa României final, which they lost in a penalty shootout to CFR Cluj, and also contributed to the team finishing second in the league during the 2011–12 season.

Because Vaslui failed to qualify for the Europa League group stage, Adrian Porumboiu appointed Spaniard Juan López Caro as club manager. However, the appointment was not a success, as he not only failed to get the side into the group tage, but he also won only three matches in the first ten rounds, and the team was eliminated from the Cupa României by Liga III side Alro Slatina. Because Caro's contract had a $1 million release clause, Porumboiu opted to suspend the Spanish manager, with the club sitting sixth in the league, only seven points behind the leader, and reinstate Viorel Hizo for Hizo's third stint as manager. Hizo not only managed to revive the team, but he turned it into a real title contender. Meanwhile, on 4 January 2011, Vaslui received a nine-month transfer ban from FIFA following a complaint by former player Marko Ljubinković. Despite Porumboiu appealing to the CAS, the decision was upheld, with the ban expiring on 6 September 2011. At the end of the 2010–11 season, despite having made no transfers in the winter break, Vaslui finished third for the second-straight year.

After the Romanian Football Federation denied a licence to FC Timișoara for 2011–12, therefore barring their participation in European competitions, Vaslui took their place in the UEFA Champions League's third qualifying round. However, Vaslui were eliminated from the competition, consequently dropping to the play-off. Vaslui faced Sparta Prague with major squad problems, as nine players were unable to play: Kuciak and Pouga refused to return to the team; Papp, Canu, Adaílton, Wesley and Gladstone were injured; and Milisavljević and Pavlović were excluded from the squad. Despite this, Vaslui earned arguably their most important victory, a 2–0 home win against Sparta. Despite losing in the second leg, Vaslui managed to qualify for the UEFA Europa League group stage for the first time. The side managed to play some great matches in the group stage against clubs like Sporting CP, Lazio and Zürich. In the same season, Vaslui finished second in Liga I.

=== Downfall, bankruptcy and a phoenix project (2012–2018) ===
The title missed in 2012 brought a lot of frustration to the Vaslui's camp, and Porumboiu again started to think about withdrawing the financing and leaving the football phenomenon. Despite this, the team gathered under the command of Viorel Hizo, having a good season, being ranked 5th, but missing the European Cups. This new failure put the real end of the football club, even tho the 2013–14 season started good, under the management of Liviu Ciobotariu, during the winter break the financial problems were too big, Adrian Porumboiu withdrew permanently and with a squad formed mostly from youth players, FC Vaslui was ranked 6th, but the licence was denied, the club accepted the verdict and was relegated to the fourth tier, subsequently being dissolved.

In the summer of 2014, FC Vaslui Supporters Association, founded ASS FC Vaslui, also known as FC Vaslui 2002. The newly formed entity was enrolled in the Liga IV – Vaslui County and ensured unofficially the football's continuity of the original club, but due to the limited budget it failed to promote in the Liga III, despite some appreciated evolutions at the level of the fourth tier. The results obtained in the seasons in which the club played under this name were the following: 5th (2014–15, 2015–16), 2nd (2016–17) and 3rd (2017–18).

== Ground ==
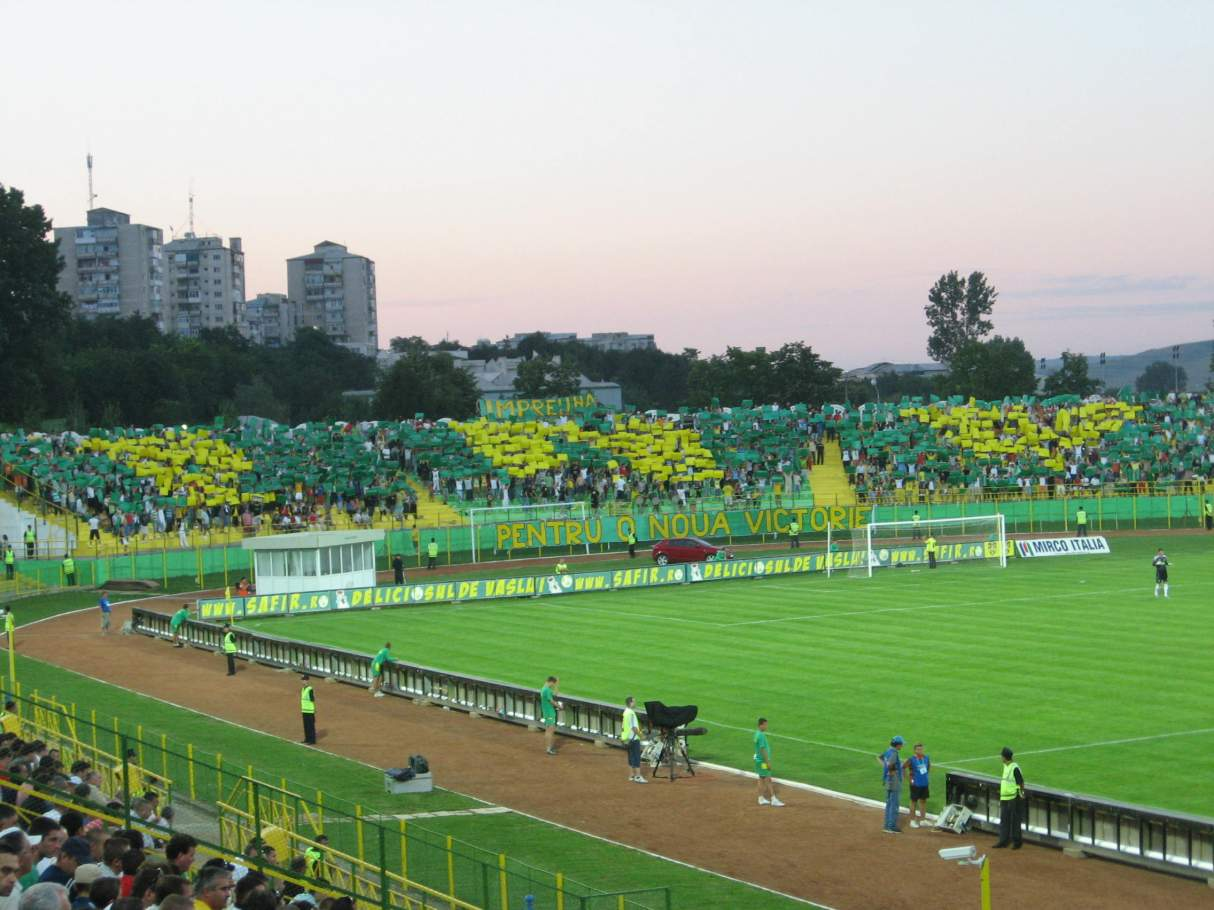
Municipal Stadium and FC Vaslui supporters in 2008.

The Municipal Stadium is a multi-purpose stadium in Vaslui. It was opened in 1972 and is owned by the Vaslui municipality. In 2002, when Victoria Galați (as they were then known) moved to Vaslui, they reached an agreement with the Vaslui municipality, and since then host their home matches at this ground. The stadium has a capacity of 18,000 spectators and has a natural grass playing surface. The Municipal Stadium also has an official stand, covered cabins for the guests and the press, a drainage and automatic irrigation system, Internet access for the media and a new club headquarters. The floodlighting system, with a density of 2000 lux, was inaugurated in 2008, this stadium being the 11th in Romania with a floodlighting system. It is rated at two stars by UEFA.

== Support ==
=== Rivalries ===
One of FC Vaslui's principal rivals was Politehnica Iași, the team representing the largest city in Moldavia, Iaşi (60 kilometres North of Vaslui). The rivalry developed in the 2001–02 Divizia C, when the previous club from Vaslui, Sportul Municipal Vaslui, was fighting for promotion to Divizia B together with Poli Iaşi, with the latter winning the championship and earning promotion to Divizia B. The rivalry between FC Vaslui and Politehnica Iaşi was fueled by another clash for promotion, this time in the 2003–04 Divizia B, with the whites and blues prevailing yet again. Ever since, the two sets of supporters participate in what is known as "The Derby of Moldavia". However, starting with their second season in Liga I, the tables have turned in favour of Vaslui after massive investments from the chairman, Adrian Porumboiu, with the yellow-greens dominating their rivals until their dissolution in 2014. Matches against CFR Cluj, Oțelul Galați, Rapid București and Steaua București also attracted considerable attention.

=== Adaptation ===
Vaslui's former player, Mike Temwanjera created his own football academy in Zimbabwe which he named Vaslui Football Academy.

== Honours ==
=== Domestic ===
==== Leagues ====
- Liga I
  - Runners-up (1): 2011–12
- Liga II
  - Winners (1): 2004–05
  - Runners-up (1): 2003–04
- Liga IV – Vaslui County
  - Runners-up (1): 2016–17 (ASS FC Vaslui)

==== Cups ====
- Cupa României
  - Runners-up (1): 2009–10

=== European ===
- UEFA Intertoto Cup
  - Winners (1): 2008 (Joint Winner)

=== Friendly ===
- Football without Owners Tournament
  - Fourth place (1): 2015

=== Individual ===
==== Liga I Foreign Player of the Year ====
- Wesley (2011, 2012)

==== Romanian Golden Shoe ====
- Wesley (2011–12)
- Liviu Antal (2013–14)

== Captains ==
The first Vaslui captain was Cătălin Popa, who previously captained "Sportul Municipal Vaslui". Sorin Frunză took over the captaincy following Popa's departure in 2003. He was team captain until his departure in 2008, when vice-captain Bogdan Buhuș took over the captaincy, but only for a short spell, since Gabriel Cânu was appointed captain by new manager, Viorel Moldovan. During Cânu's first long-term injury, Buhuș was team captain while during his second long-term injury, team captain was Wesley. During 2012–13 season, the captaincy swang between N'Doye, Sânmărtean and Coman until Sânmărtean's permanent appointment.

#	Name	Years	Years captain	Notes
1.	(Romania) Cătălin Popa	2003–04	2003–04	
2.	(Romania) Sorin Frunză	2002–08	2003–08	Vice-captains: I. Badea, Buhuș.
3.	(Romania) Gabriel Cânu	2008–13	2008–11	Vice-captains: Buhuș, Wesley.
4.	(Brazil) Wesley	2009–12	2011–12	
5.	(Romania) Lucian Sânmărtean	2010–14	2012–14	
6.	(Zimbabwe) Mike Temwanjera	2007–14	2013–14	

=== Managerial history ===
Vaslui's last manager was Liviu Ciobotariu, who was in charge from 8 October 2013 until 24 April 2014, when he resigned due to the financial problems. Costinel Botez was interim until 19 May, when Vaslui officially relegated from Liga I.

== Records and statistics ==
FC Vaslui's first competitive game was a 3–1 victory in Divizia C against Viitorul Hârlău. Mike Temwanjera holds Vaslui's overall appearance record – he played 202 matches over the course of 7 seasons from 2007 until 2014, and he also holds the record for League appearances with 174.

Vaslui's all-time leading scorer is Wesley, whose goals for the club included a league-leading 27 in 2011–12. He was the top scorer in 2011–12 Liga I with 27 league goals. The most goals scored by a player in a single match is four, Valentin Badea achieving this feat. Cătălin Andruș holds the club record for the fastest hat-trick, where he scored three goals in five minutes against CFR Pașcani in the 2002–03 season. Wesley is also Vaslui's all-time leading goalscorer in European competition, with six goals.

Vaslui's biggest victory is 9–0 against Ceahlăul Piatra Neamț II in 2003. A 2–5 defeat against UTA Arad in 2006 was among Vaslui's heaviest league losses. Vaslui's 3–1 win against Liepājas Metalurgs in the UEFA Cup was its biggest European home win, according to UEFA.

=== League history ===
Season	Tier	Division	Place	Cupa României
2017–18	4	Liga IV (VS)	3rd	withdrew
2016–17	4	Liga IV (VS)	2nd	
2013–14	1	Liga I	6th (R)	Quarter-finals
2012–13	1	Liga I	5th	Round of 32
2011–12	1	Liga I	2nd	Semi-finals
2010–11	1	Liga I	3rd	Round of 32
2009–10	1	Liga I	3rd	Final
2008–09	1	Liga I	5th	Semi-finals
2007–08	1	Liga I	7th	Round of 32
2006–07	1	Liga I	8th	Round of 32
2005–06	1	Divizia A	14th	Round of 16
2004–05	2	Divizia B (Seria I)	1st (C, P)	
2003–04	2	Divizia B (Seria I)	2nd	
2002–03	3	Divizia C (Seria I)	3rd (P)	

=== Liga I ===
Season	Position	Wins	Draws	Losses	Goals	Points
2005–06	14	6	11	13	23–37	29
2006–07	8	13	11	10	41–44	50
2007–08	7	12	11	11	44–34	47
2008–09	5	17	6	11	44–37	57
2009–10	3	18	8	8	44–28	62
2010–11	3	18	11	5	51–28	65
2011–12	2	22	4	8	58–29	70
2012–13	5	16	10	8	50–33	58
2013–14	5	15	6	13	38–32	51

=== European record ===
Notes for the abbreviations in the tables below:

- 1R: First round
- 3R: Third round
- 2QR: Second qualifying round
- 3QR: Third qualifying round
- PO: Play-off round

Season	Competition	Round	Club	Home	Away	Aggregate
2008–09	UEFA Intertoto Cup	3R	(Azerbaijan) Neftçi	2–0	1–2	3–2
2008–09	UEFA Cup	2QR	(Latvia) Liepājas Metalurgs	3–1	2–0	5–1
2008–09	UEFA Cup	1R	(Czech Republic) Slavia Prague	1–1	0–0	1–1 (a)
2009–10	Europa League	3QR	(Cyprus) Omonia	2–0	1–1	3–1
2009–10	Europa League	PO	(Greece) AEK Athens	2–1	0–3	2–4
2010–11	Europa League	PO	(France) Lille	0–0	0–2	0–2
2011–12	Champions League	3QR	(Netherlands) Twente	0–0	0–2	0–2
2011–12	Europa League	PO	(Czech Republic) Sparta Prague	2–0	0–1	2–1
2011–12	Europa League	Group stage	(Portugal) Sporting CP	1–0	0–2	3rd
2011–12	Europa League	Group stage	(Italy) Lazio	0–0	2–2	3rd
2011–12	Europa League	Group stage	(Switzerland) Zürich	2–2	0–2	3rd
2012–13	Champions League	3QR	(Turkey) Fenerbahçe	1–4	1–1	2–5
2012–13	Europa League	PO	(Italy) Internazionale	0–2	2–2	2–4

== Notable former players ==
The footballers enlisted below have had international cap(s) for their respective countries at junior and/or senior level. Players whose name is listed in bold represented their countries while playing for FC Vaslui.

- (Romania) **Liviu Antal** (2012–14)
- (Romania) Ștefan Apostol (2006–08)
- (Romania) Ionuț Badea (2005–06)
- (Romania) Valentin Badea (2002–06)
- (Romania) Silviu Bălace (2007–11)
- (Romania) Bogdan Buhuș (2005–10)
- (Romania) **Lucian Burdujan** (2008–10)
- (Romania) **Gabriel Cânu** (2008–12)
- (Romania) Raul Costin (2009–13)
- (Romania) Marius Croitoru (2006-07)
- (Romania) Sorin Frunză (2002–08)
- (Romania) Adrian Gheorghiu (2006–12)
- (Romania) **Cristian Hăisan** (2002–10)
- (Romania) **Ștefan Mardare** (2006–08)
- (Romania) **Marius Niculae** (2012–13)
- (Romania) Bogdan Panait (2003–09)
- (Romania) **Paul Papp** (2009–12)
- (Romania) **Dănuț Coman** (2012–13)
- (Romania) **Marian Aliuță** (2010)
- (Romania) Alin Pânzaru (2002–05)
- (Romania) Ionuț Balaur (2006–14)
- (Romania) **Lucian Sânmărtean** (2010–14)
- (Romania) **Nicolae Stanciu** (2012–13)
- (Romania) Ion Voicu (2006–07)
- (Lithuania) **Vytautas Černiauskas** (2010–14)
- (Cape Verde) **Fernando Varela** (2012–13)
- (Honduras) **Carlo Costly** (2010)
- (Bosnia and Herzegovina) Petar Jovanović (2005–12)
- (Brazil) Adaílton (2010–12)
- (Brazil) Cauê (2012–13)
- (Brazil) Wesley (2009–12)
- (Brazil) Gladstone (2010–2012)
- (Brazil) Willian Gerlem (2009–12)
- (Bulgaria) **Stanislav Genchev** (2008–11)
- (Bulgaria) **Zhivko Milanov** (2010–13)
- (Moldova) **Viorel Frunză** (2004–06)
- (Moldova) **Denis Zmeu** (2007–13)
- (Poland) **Piotr Celeban** (2012–14)
- (Portugal) **Hugo Luz** (2008–12)
- (Senegal) **Ousmane N'Doye** (2008–09), (2012–13)
- (Serbia) Milorad Bukvić (2006–08)
- (Serbia) Marko Ljubinković (2006–10)
- (Serbia) Nemanja Milisavljević (2009–12)
- (Serbia) **Miloš Pavlović** (2009–12)
- (Slovakia) **Pavol Farkaš** (2009–12)
- (Slovakia) **Dušan Kuciak** (2008–11)
- (Zimbabwe) Mike Temwanjera (2007–14)

== Player of the year ==
Year	Winner
2002–03	(Romania) Sorin Frunză
2003–04	(Romania) Sorin Frunză
2004–05	(Romania) Valentin Badea
2005–06	(Romania) Valentin Badea
2006–07	(Romania) Cristian Hăisan
2007–08	(Serbia) Marko Ljubinković
2008–09	(Bulgaria) Stanislav Genchev
2009–10	(Brazil) Wesley
2010–11	(Brazil) Adaílton
2011–12	(Brazil) Wesley

Year	Winner
2012–13	(Poland) Piotr Celeban
2013–14	(Romania) Liviu Antal
