= 2009–10 FC Vaslui season =

FC Vaslui
2009–10 season
- Owner: Adrian Porumboiu
- President: Ciprian Damian
- Manager: Cristian Dulca (Released on 21 Sep 2009); Dorin Zotincã (caretaker) (From 21 Sep 2009 to 28 Sep 2009); Marius Lăcătuş (From 28 Sep 2009)
- Stadium: Municipal
- Liga I: 3rd
- Cupa României: Runner-up
- Europa League: Play-off, eliminated
- Top goalscorer: League: Wesley (12); All: Wesley (17)
- Highest home attendance: 9,000 vs AEK Athens (20 August 2009)
- Lowest home attendance: 1,000 vs Unirea Alba Iulia (4 April 2010)

The 2009–10 season is the eighth season in FC Vaslui's existence, and its fifth in a row in Liga I. Having finished in the top six last season, FC Vaslui is qualified for the Third qualifying round in Europa League.

== Pre-season ==
On 16 June, FC Vaslui's officials confirmed that the team will have a cantonment in Gogh, Germany, where will play 6 friendly games, against VfR Fischeln, FC Eindhoven, Ankaraspor A.Ş., Alemannia Aachen, Fortuna Düsseldorf and Gaziantepspor. FC Vaslui's first transfer, Farul's Willian Gerlem was confirmed by Adrian Porumboiu for €700.000 on June. It was also confirmed that Ioan Sdrobiş will be second team's technical manager. On 25 June, António Semedo confirmed that he will sign a 2-year contract with FC Vaslui. Also, on 25 June, Daniel Munteanu was released by the club because of his poor performance against FC Brașov, in the previous season. On 15 July, FC Vaslui signed a one-year contract sponsorship with New Holland, and will receive 1 million €. The contract could extend for another year, if FC Vaslui will have a long European season. On 22 July, FC Vaslui obtained a one-year loan for Constantin Gângioveanu from Universitatea Craiova.

=== Friendly matches ===
Friendlies
Kick Off	Opponents	H / A	Result	Scorers	Referee	Attendance	Report
2009-07-09 18:30	(Germany) VfR Fischeln	A	2–0	Temwanjera 38', Wesley 45' (pen)			
2009-07-11 18:00	(Netherlands) FC Eindhoven	A	2–1	Burdujan 11', Temwanjera 65'			
2009-07-13 20:00	(Turkey) Ankaraspor A.Ş.	A	1–0	Ljubinković 57'			
2009-07-15 20:00	(Germany) Alemannia Aachen	A	2–2	Zmeu 5', Wesley 90' (pen)		1,000	
2009-07-16 20:00	(Turkey) İstanbulspor A.Ş.	A	0–1				
2009-07-17 20:00	(Germany) Fortuna Düsseldorf	A	0–1				
2009-07-19	(Turkey) Gaziantepspor	A	1–0	Wesley 37'			
2009-07-27 20:00	(Romania) Sporting Vaslui	H	9–0	Wesley (5), Ljubinković, Akakpo, Genchev, Balaur			

== First-team squad ==
No.	Name	Age	Nat.	Since	T. Apps.	L. Apps.	C. Apps.	I. Apps.	T. Goals	L. Goals	C. Goals	I. Goals	Transfer fee	Notes
Goalkeepers
1	Dušan Kuciak	24	(Slovakia)	2008	74	54	8	9	0	0	0	0	€0.8M	
22	Claudiu Puia	22	(Romania)	2006	1	0	1	0	0	0	0	0	Free	
81	Cristian Hăisan	28	(Romania)	2002	92	85	6	1	0	0	0	0	Free	
Defenders
3	Paul Papp	19	(Romania)	2009 (W)	20	17	3	0	2	2	0	0	€0.05M	
6	Gladstone	24	(Brazil)	2010 (W)	14	11	3	0	0	0	0	0	Free	
14	Serge Akakpo	21	(Togo)	2009 (W)	23	18	4	1	2	2	0	0	€0.5M	
15	Bogdan Buhuş	29	(Romania)	2005	144	125	10	9	0	0	0	0	Free	
16	Stéphane Zubar	22	(France)	2009 (W)	43	36	3	4	1	1	0	0	€0.4M	
17	Dinu Sânmărtean	28	(Romania)	2010 (W)	28	27	1	0	0	0	0	0	Free	
20	Zhivko Milanov	25	(Bulgaria)	2010 (W)	20	17	3	0	0	0	0	0	€0.35M	
26	Pavol Farkaš	24	(Slovakia)	2009 (W)	36	30	4	2	2	2	0	0	€0.2M	
27	Hugo Luz	27	(Portugal)	2008 (W)	65	56	5	4	2	2	0	0	€0.05M	
28	Gabriel Cânu	28	(Romania)	2008	30	21	3	6	3	2	0	1	€0.36M	
Midfielders
4	Stanislav Genchev	28	(Bulgaria)	2008	68	55	4	9	8	5	1	2	Free	
5	Marius Ştefoi	19	(Romania)	2009 (W)	3	3	0	0	0	0	0	0	€0.05M	
8	Denis Zmeu	24	(Moldova)	2007 (W)	78	63	9	6	2	2	0	0	€0.2M	
10	Gerlem	24	(Brazil)	2009	29	24	1	4	4	4	0	0	€0.6M	
11	Nemanja Milisavljević	24	(Serbia)	2009 (W)	41	36	5	0	2	2	0	0	€0.5M	
18	Lucian Sânmărtean	29	(Romania)	2010 (W)	19	16	3	0	1	0	1	0	Free	
23	Miloš Pavlović	25	(Serbia)	2009 (W)	55	43	8	4	2	2	0	0	€0.25M	
30	Raul Costin	24	(Romania)	2009	30	24	5	1	4	2	2	0	€0.1M	
31	Adrian Gheorghiu	27	(Romania)	2006	91	81	6	4	10	9	1	0	Undisclosed	
80	Wesley	28	(Brazil)	2009 (W)	59	47	8	4	25	19	3	3	€1.5M	
Forwards
7	Răzvan Neagu	22	(Romania)	2006	46	42	4	0	2	2	0	0	Undisclosed	
9	Lucian Burdujan	25	(Romania)	2008	59	46	6	7	15	8	4	3	Swap	
13	Carlo Costly	27	(Honduras)	2010 (W)	15	13	2	0	5	4	1	0	€0.5M	
19	Mike Temwanjera	27	(Zimbabwe)	2007 (W)	108	92	6	10	28	22	3	3	Undisclosed	
25	Roberto Delgado	23	(Spain)	2009	25	22	3	0	2	2	0	0	Free	
33	Ionuţ Balaur	20	(Romania)	2007	1	1	0	0	0	0	0	0	Youth	

- T=Total
- L=Liga I
- C=Cupa României
- I=UEFA Europa League, Intertoto UEFA Cup

== Second-team squad ==
No.	Name	Nationality	Position	Date of birth (age)	Signed from	Notes
Goalkeepers
1	Mihai Luca	(Romania)	GK	17 March 1988 (age 38)	Cetatea Suceava	

== Transfers ==
=== Summer ===
==== In ====
#	Pos	Player	From	Fee	Date
10	MF	(Brazil) Willian Gerlem	(Romania) Farul	€0.6 million	22 June 2009
18	MF	(Romania) Constantin Gângioveanu	(Romania) Universitatea Craiova	Loan	22 July 2009
25	FW	(Romania) Răzvan Neagu	(Romania) FCM Bacău	loan return	10 June 2009
30	MF	(Romania) Raul Costin	(Romania) Dacia Mioveni	Undisclosed	18 July 2009
81	GK	(Romania) Cristian Hăisan	(Romania) FCM Bacău	loan return	10 June 2009
TBA	GK	(Romania) Mihai Luca	(Romania) Cetatea Suceava	loan return	10 June 2009
TBA	DF	(Romania) Bogdan Panait	(Romania) CS Otopeni	loan return	10 June 2009
TBA	DF	(Serbia) Petar Jovanović	(Romania) Poli Iaşi	loan return	10 June 2009
TBA	MF	(Romania) Marius Doboş	(Romania) FCM Bacău	loan return	10 June 2009

==== Out ====
#	Pos	Player	To	Fee	Date
2	DF	(Romania) Paul Papp	(Romania) Farul	loan	3 September 2009
12	GK	(Italy) Alessio Chiaverini	Unknown	Released	Summer
25	FW	(Romania) Răzvan Neagu	(Romania) Gloria Bistriţa	loan	11 September 2009
29	DF	(Romania) Daniel Munteanu	(Romania) Unirea Urziceni	Released	25 June 2009
TBD	DF	(Romania) Bogdan Panait	(Romania) CS Otopeni	loan	August 2009
TBD	MF	(Romania) Marius Doboş	(Romania) FCM Bacău	loan	2 September 2009
TBA	DF	(Serbia) Petar Jovanović	(Serbia) FK Sevojno	free	September 2009

=== Winter ===
==== In ====
#	Pos	Player	From	Fee	Date
3	DF	(Romania) Paul Papp	(Romania) Farul	loan return	28 December 2009
6	DF	(Brazil) Gladstone	(Brazil) Cruzeiro	free	14 February 2010
7	FW	(Romania) Răzvan Neagu	(Romania) Gloria Bistriţa	loan return	28 December 2009
13	FW	(Honduras) Carlo Costly	(Poland) GKS Bełchatów	€0.5 million	21 January 2010
17	DF	(Romania) Dinu Sânmărtean	(Romania) Gloria Bistriţa	free	12 February 2010
18	MF	(Romania) Lucian Sânmărtean	(Romania) Gloria Bistriţa	free	23 December 2009
20	DF	(Bulgaria) Zhivko Milanov	(Bulgaria) Levski Sofia	€0.35 million	14 January 2010

==== Out ====
#	Pos	Player	From	Fee	Date
3	DF	(Romania) Dorian Andronic	(Romania) CS Otopeni	loan	9 February 2010
17	DF	(Romania) Silviu Bălace	(Romania) Universitatea Craiova	loan	1 February 2010
18	MF	(Romania) Constantin Gângioveanu	(Romania) Universitatea Craiova	loan return	28 December 2009
21	FW	(Serbia) Nemanja Jovanović	(Romania) Unirea Alba Iulia	loan	3 February 2010
29	FW	(North Macedonia) Hristijan Kirovski	(North Macedonia) FK Vardar	free	19 February 2010

== Statistics ==
=== Appearances and goals ===
Last updated on 22 May 2010.

No.	Pos	Nat	Player	Total		Liga I		Europa League		Cupa României	
No.	Pos	Nat	Player	Apps	Goals	Apps	Goals	Apps	Goals	Apps	Goals
1	GK	(Slovakia) SVK	Dušan Kuciak	30	-23	23	-18	3	-4	4	-1
3	DF	(Romania) ROU	Paul Papp	19	2	16	2	0	0	3	0
4	MF	(Bulgaria) BUL	Stanislav Genchev	25	2	16+5	2	3	0	1	0
6	DF	(Brazil) BRA	Gladstone Pereira	14	0	10+1	0	0	0	3	0
7	FW	(Romania) ROU	Răzvan Neagu	10	0	2+6	0	0	0	0+2	0
8	MF	(Moldova) MDA	Denis Zmeu	20	0	4+9	0	1+2	0	1+3	0
9	FW	(Romania) ROU	Lucian Burdujan	23	4	15+3	2	2	0	3	2
10	MF	(Brazil) BRA	Willian Gerlem	29	4	23+1	4	4	0	1	0
11	MF	(Serbia) SRB	Nemanja Milisavljević	23	1	6+14	1	0	0	2+1	0
13	FW	(Honduras) HON	Carlo Costly	15	5	12+1	4	0	0	2	1
14	DF	(Togo) TOG	Serge Akakpo	18	2	11+3	2	1	0	2+1	0
15	DF	(Romania) ROU	Bogdan Buhuş	22	0	15+1	0	3	0	3	0
16	MF	(France) FRA	Stéphane Zubar	33	1	25+1	1	4	0	3	0
17	DF	(Romania) ROU	Dinu Sânmărtean	5	0	3+1	0	0	0	1	0
18	MF	(Romania) ROU	Lucian Sânmărtean	19	1	11+5	0	0	0	3	1
19	FW	(Zimbabwe) ZIM	Mike Temwanjera	25	9	16+2	5	4	2	3	2
20	DF	(Bulgaria) BUL	Zhivko Milanov	20	0	17	0	0	0	3	0
23	MF	(Serbia) SRB	Miloš Pavlović	37	1	24+3	1	3+1	0	6	0
25	FW	(Spain) ESP	Roberto Delgado	25	2	8+14	2	0	0	1+2	0
26	DF	(Slovakia) SVK	Pavol Farkas	18	0	14	0	2	0	2	0
27	DF	(Portugal) POR	Hugo Luz	24	1	21	1	0	0	3	0
28	DF	(Romania) ROU	Gabriel Cânu	2	0	0	0	2	0	0	0
30	MF	(Romania) ROU	Raul Costin	30	4	16+8	2	0+1	0	3+2	2
31	MF	(Romania) ROU	Adrian Gheorghiu	10	0	6+2	0	0	0	1+1	0
80	FW	(Brazil) BRA	Wesley Lopes	41	17	31	12	4	3	6	2
81	GK	(Romania) ROU	Cristian Hăisan	15	-11	11+1	-10	1	-1	2	0
Players sold or loaned out during the season
6	DF	(Serbia) SRB	Neven Marković	3	0	2	0	0	0	1	0
7	MF	(Romania) ROU	Vasile Buhăescu	6	0	0+4	0	0	0	1+1	0
17	DF	(Romania) ROU	Silviu Bălace	10	0	5	0	4	0	1	0
18	MF	(Romania) ROU	Constantin Gângioveanu	5	0	1+1	0	0+3	0	0	0
20	MF	(Serbia) SRB	Marko Ljubinković	11	0	7+1	0	3	0	0	0
21	FW	(Serbia) SRB	Nemanja Jovanović	20	3	3+10	3	0+4	0	0+3	0
29	FW	(North Macedonia) MKD	Hristijan Kirovski	1	1	0	0	0	0	0+1	1
Statistics of the FC Vaslui players playing for another team
2	DF	(Romania) ROU	Paul Papp for Farul	12	0	10	0	0	0	2	0
3	DF	(Romania) ROU	Dorian Andronic for CS Otopeni	2	0	2	0	0	0	0	0
7	MF	(Romania) ROU	Vasile Buhăescu for Concordia Chiajna	11	5	11	5	0	0	0	0
17	DF	(Romania) ROU	Silviu Bălace for Universitatea Craiova	15	0	15	0	0	0	0	0
21	FW	(Serbia) SRB	Nemanja Jovanović for Unirea Alba Iulia	16	2	16	2	0	0	0	0
25	FW	(Romania) ROU	Răzvan Neagu for Gloria Bistriţa	3	0	2	0	0	0	1	0
-	MF	(Romania) ROU	Marius Doboş for FCM Bacău	21	4	20	4	0	0	1	0
-	DF	(Romania) ROU	Bogdan Panait for CS Otopeni	19	1	17	1	0	0	2	0

=== Top scorers ===
Position	Nation	Number	Name	Liga I	Europa League	Romanian Cup	Total
1	(Brazil)	80	Wesley	12	3	2	17
2	(Zimbabwe)	19	Mike Temwanjera	5	2	2	9
3	(Honduras)	13	Carlo Costly	4	0	1	5
4	(Brazil)	10	Willian Gerlem	4	0	0	4
=	(Romania)	9	Lucian Burdujan	2	0	2	4
=	(Romania)	30	Raul Costin	2	0	2	4
7	(Serbia)	21	Nemanja Jovanović	3	0	0	3
8	(Togo)	14	Serge Akakpo	2	0	0	2
=	(Spain)	25	Roberto Delgado	2	0	0	2
=	(Bulgaria)	4	Stanislav Genchev	2	0	0	2
=	(Romania)	3	Paul Papp	2	0	0	2
12	(Portugal)	27	Hugo Luz	1	0	0	1
=	(Serbia)	11	Nemanja Milisavljević	1	0	0	1
=	(Serbia)	23	Miloš Pavlović	1	0	0	1
=	(France)	16	Stéphane Zubar	1	0	0	1
=	(North Macedonia)	29	Hristijan Kirovski	0	0	1	1
=	(Romania)	18	Lucian Sânmărtean	0	0	1	1
/	/	/	Own Goals	0	0	0	0
			TOTALS	44	5	11	60

=== Disciplinary record ===
Position	Nation	Number	Name	Liga I		Europa League		Romanian Cup		Total	
Position	Nation	Number	Name	Booked	Sent off (straight red)	Booked	Sent off (straight red)	Booked	Sent off (straight red)	Booked	Sent off (straight red)
GK	(Slovakia)	1	Dušan Kuciak	2	0	0	1	0	0	2	1
DF	(Romania)	3	Paul Papp	5	0	0	0	2	0	7	0
MF	(Bulgaria)	4	Stanislav Genchev	5	0	0	0	0	0	5	0
DF	(Brazil)	6	Gladstone	3	0	0	0	0	0	3	0
FW	(Romania)	9	Lucian Burdujan	2	0	0	0	1	0	3	0
MF	(Brazil)	10	Willian Gerlem	1	0	1	0	0	0	2	0
MF	(Serbia)	11	Nemanja Milisavljević	1	0	0	0	0	0	1	0
FW	(Honduras)	13	Carlos Costly	5	0	0	0	0	0	5	0
DF	(Togo)	14	Serge Akakpo	2	0	1	0	0	0	3	0
DF	(Romania)	15	Bogdan Buhuş	3	0	2	0	2	0	7	0
DF	(France)	16	Stéphane Zubar	6	0	1	0	0	0	7	0
DF	(Romania)	17	Silviu Bălace	0	1	1	0	0	0	1	1
DF	(Romania)	17	Dinu Sânmărtean	2	0	0	0	0	0	2	0
MF	(Romania)	18	Lucian Sânmărtean	1	0	0	0	1	0	2	0
FW	(Zimbabwe)	19	Mike Temwanjera	4	0	0	0	0	0	4	0
MF	(Serbia)	20	Marko Ljubinković	1	0	1	0	0	0	2	0
DF	(Bulgaria)	20	Zhivko Milanov	1	0	0	0	1	0	2	0
FW	(Serbia)	21	Nemanja Jovanović	1	0	0	0	1	0	2	0
MF	(Serbia)	23	Miloš Pavlović	11	1	2	0	2	0	15	1
FW	(Spain)	25	Roberto Delgado	2	0	0	0	1	0	3	0
DF	(Slovakia)	26	Pavol Farkas	3	0	0	0	1	0	4	0
DF	(Portugal)	27	Hugo Luz	4	0	0	0	0	0	4	0
FW	(North Macedonia)	29	Hristijan Kirovski	0	0	0	0	1	0	1	0
MF	(Romania)	30	Raul Costin	5	0	0	0	2	0	7	0
MF	(Romania)	31	Adrian Gheorghiu	1	0	0	0	0	0	1	0
MF	(Brazil)	80	Wesley	4	0	0	0	1	0	5	0
			TOTALS	81	2	9	1	15	0	105	3

=== Overall ===
Games played	44 (34 Liga I, 4 UEFA Europa League, 6 Cupa României)
Games won	24 (18 Liga I, 2 UEFA Europa League, 4 Cupa României)
Games drawn	10 (8 Liga I, 1 UEFA Europa League, 1 Cupa României)
Games lost	10 (8 Liga I, 1 UEFA Europa League, 1 Cupa României)
Goals scored	60
Goals conceded	34
Goal difference	+26
Yellow cards	105
Red cards	3
Worst discipline	(Serbia) Miloš Pavlović with 15 yellow cards and 1 red card
Best result	5–0 (A) v Chimia Brazi – Cupa României – 23 Sep 2009
Worst result	0–3 (A) v AEK Athens – Europa League – 27 Aug 2009
Most appearances	(Brazil) Wesley with 41 appearances
Top scorer	(Brazil) Wesley (17 goals)
Points	62/102 (60.7%)

Last updated: 22 May

==== Performances ====
Updated to games played on 26 May 2010.

	All								Home						Away					
	Pld	Pts	W	D	L	GF	GA	GD	W	D	L	GF	GA	GD	W	D	L	GF	GA	GD
League	34	62	18	8	8	44	28	+16	11	3	3	25	12	+13	7	5	5	19	16	+3
Overall	44	–	24	10	10	60	34	+26	15	3	3	34	13	+21	9	7	7	26	21	+5

==== Goal minutes ====
Updated to games played on 22 May 2010.

1'–15'	16'–30'	31'–HT	46'–60'	61'–75'	76'–FT	Extra time
6	10	6	14	13	11	0

==== International appearances ====
Player	Position	Country	Caps this season	Goals this season
Serge Akakpo	Right back	Togo	vs. Angola, Morocco, Cameroon, Japan, Gabon	
Carlo Costly	Striker	Honduras	vs. Turkey	
Dušan Kuciak	Goalkeeper	Slovakia	vs. Cameroon	
Zhivko Milanov	Right back	Bulgaria	vs. Poland	
Paul Papp	Centre back	Romania U-21	vs. Israel U-21	
Stanislav Genchev	Centre midfielder	Bulgaria	None^{1}	

Notes

- ^1 Stanislav Genchev was called for Bulgaria, but was not capped.

== Records ==
=== Comeback ===
FC Vaslui have conceded the first goal in a match 14 times this season in the Liga I, Cupa României and the Europa League, recorded 4 wins, 1 draw and 9 losses.

Opponent	H/A	Result	Scoreline
Gloria Bistriţa	A	3–1	Săceanu 31', Wesley 56', Temwanjera 59', N. Jovanović 59'
Unirea Urziceni	A	2–1	Onofraş 7', Gerlem 50', Wesley 72'
Internaţional Curtea de Argeş	A	2–1	Băcilă 45', Costly 71', Milisavljević 81'
Steaua	H	2–1	Stancu 45+1', Burdujan 68' (pen.), Papp 82'

== Liga I ==
=== League table ===
Pos	Team	Pld	W	D	L	GF	GA	GD	Pts	Qualification or relegation
1	CFR Cluj (C)	34	20	9	5	46	23	+23	69	Qualification to Champions League group stage
2	Unirea Urziceni	34	18	12	4	53	26	+27	66	Qualification to Champions League third qualifying round
3	Vaslui	34	18	8	8	44	28	+16	62 (Note: VAS 2–1 STE; STE 2–1 VAS)	Qualification to Europa League play-off round (Note: Since 2009–10 Cupa României winners CFR Cluj and runners-up Vaslui qualified for European competitions via their league placement, the allocation of UEFA Europa League spots effectively reverted to league placement as well, with the 6th-placed team Dinamo București also qualifying.)
4	Steaua București	34	18	8	8	49	36	+13	62	Qualification to Europa League play-off round
5	Timișoara	34	15	14	5	55	27	+28	59	Qualification to Europa League third qualifying round

Source: LPF (in Romanian)
Rules for classification: 1) points; 2) head-to-head points; 3) head-to-head goal difference; 4) head-to-head goals scored; 5) goal difference; 6) number of goals scored.
(C) Champions

=== Results summary ===
Overall								Home						Away					
Pld	W	D	L	GF	GA	GD	Pts	W	D	L	GF	GA	GD	W	D	L	GF	GA	GD
34	18	8	8	44	28	+16	62	11	3	3	25	12	+13	7	5	5	19	16	+3

=== Results by round ===
Round	1	2	3	4	5	6	7	8	9	10	11	12	13	14	15	16	17	18	19	20	21	22	23	24	25	26	27	28	29	30	31	32	33	34
Ground	H	A	H	A	H	A	H	A	H	A	A	H	A	H	A	H	A	A	H	A	H	A	H	A	H	A	H	H	A	H	A	H	A	H
Result	W	L	D	W	W	L	L	L	W	W	W	W	W	W	L	D	D	D	W	D	L	W	W	W	W	D	D	L	W	W	D	W	L	W
Position	4	9	10	4	4	7	9	11	9	8	5	4	3	1	5	6	6	6	5	6	7	7	6	2	2	3	4	5	5	4	4	3	4	3

Updated to match(es) played on 22 May 2010. Source: LPF
A = Away; H = Home; W = Win; D = Draw; L = Loss

== Matches ==
=== Liga I ===
8 August 2009 Matchday 2	Pandurii	1–0	FC Vaslui	Târgu Jiu
19:00 EET	Stângă 12'	(Report)		Stadium: Tudor Vladimirescu; Attendance: 5 000; Referee: Robert Dumitru (Brașov)

12 August 2009 Matchday 1	FC Vaslui	2–1	Gaz Metan Mediaş	Vaslui
19:00 EET	Genchev 19'; H. Luz 69'	(Report)	Bud 89'	Stadium: Municipal; Attendance: 3 000; Referee: Ciprian Danşa (Oradea)

16 August 2009 Matchday 3	FC Vaslui	2–2	FC Brașov	Vaslui
19:00 EET	Wesley 54'; Zubar 82'	(Report)	Ezequias 15'; Roman 57'	Stadium: Municipal; Attendance: 4 000; Referee: Radu Petrescu (București)

23 August 2009 Matchday 4	Gloria Bistriţa	1–3	FC Vaslui	Bistriţa
19:00 EET	Săceanu 31'	(Report)	Wesley 56'; Temwanjera 59'; N. Jovanović 84'	Stadium: Gloria; Attendance: 3 000; Referee: Marian Bordean (Sibiu)

30 August 2009 Matchday 5	FC Vaslui	2–1	Poli Iaşi	Vaslui
20:00 EET	Costin 52'; Wesley 82'	(Report)	Miclea 94'	Stadium: Municipal; Attendance: 5 000; Referee: Marian Balaci (Drobeta-Turnu Severin)

12 September 2009 Matchday 6	Rapid	3–2	FC Vaslui	Bucharest
18:00 EET	Herea 19', 78'; Buga 74'	(Report)	N. Jovanović 10', 66'	Stadium: Giuleşti; Attendance: 3 500; Referee: Augustus Constantin (Râmnicu-Vâlcea)

20 September 2009 Matchday 7	FC Vaslui	0–1	FC Timișoara	Vaslui
21:45 EET		(Report)	Goga 56'	Stadium: Municipal; Attendance: 4 000; Referee: Robert Schoergenhofer (Austria)

26 September 2009 Matchday 8	Unirea Alba Iulia	2–0	FC Vaslui	Alba Iulia
17:00 EET	Cristea 45'; Dâlbea 58'	(Report)		Stadium: Victoria-Cetate; Attendance: 3 000; Referee: Cătălin Buşi (Râmnicu-Vâlcea)

3 October 2009 Matchday 9	FC Vaslui	3–1	Astra Ploiești	Vaslui
18:00 EET	Gerlem 18'; Temwanjera 33'; Pavlović 64'	(Report)	Paulinho 42'	Stadium: Municipal; Attendance: 3 000; Referee: Mugurel Drăgănescu (Breaza)

16 October 2009 Matchday 10	Unirea Urziceni	1–2	FC Vaslui	Urziceni
18:30 EET	Onofraş 7'	(Report)	Gerlem 50'; Wesley 72'	Stadium: Tineretului; Attendance: 1 000; Referee: Matteo Trefoloni (Italy)

24 October 2009 Matchday 11	Universitatea Craiova	1–2	FC Vaslui	Craiova
18:15 EET	F. Costea 89'	(Report)	Temwanjera 25'; Genchev 51'	Stadium: Ion Oblemenco; Attendance: 2 000; Referee: Antonio Rubinos Perez (Spain)

1 November 2009 Matchday 12	FC Vaslui	1–0	Internaţional Curtea de Argeş	Vaslui
16:00 EET	Akakpo 4'	(Report)		Stadium: Municipal; Attendance: 3 000; Referee: Georgian Ionescu (Buzău)

7 November 2009 Matchday 13	Ceahlăul	0–1	FC Vaslui	Piatra Neamţ
19:00 EET		(Report)	Temwanjera 42'	Stadium: Pietricica; Attendance: 4 000; Referee: Alexandru Tudor (București)

23 November 2009 Matchday 14	FC Vaslui	2–0	CFR Cluj	Vaslui
18:00 EET	Temwanjera 7'; Wesley 74'			Stadium: Municipal; Attendance: 5 000; Referee: Augustus Constantin (Râmnicu-Vâlcea)

29 November 2009 Matchday 15	Steaua	2–1	FC Vaslui	Bucharest
20:00 EET	Kapetanos 58'; Szekely 93'	(Report)	Gerlem 22'	Stadium: Ghencea; Attendance: 3 000; Referee: Philippe Kalt (France)

6 December 2009 Matchday 16	FC Vaslui	1–1	Oţelul Galaţi	Vaslui
16:00 EET	Burdujan 38'	(Report)	Sârghi 3'	Stadium: Municipal; Attendance: 5 000; Referee: Mugurel Drăgănescu (Breaza)

13 December 2009 Matchday 17	Dinamo	1–1	FC Vaslui	Bucharest
20:00 EET	N'Doye 58' (pen.)	(Report)	Wesley 49'	Stadium: Ştefan cel Mare; Attendance: 1 500; Referee: Carlos Clos Gómez (Spain)

21 February 2010 Matchday 18	Gaz Metan Mediaş	0–0	FC Vaslui	Mediaş
14:00 EET		(Report)		Stadium: Municipal Gaz Metan; Attendance: 2 500; Referee: Alexandru Tudor (București)

27 February 2010 Matchday 19	FC Vaslui	2–1	Pandurii	Vaslui
17:00 EET	Gerlem 5' (pen.); Delgado 61'	(Report)	Štromajer 67'	Stadium: Municipal; Attendance: 4 000; Referee: Ovidiu Haţegan (Arad)

8 March 2010 Matchday 20	FC Brașov	1–1	FC Vaslui	Brașov
17:00 EET	Abrudan 64'	(Report)	Delgado 20'	Stadium: Tineretului; Attendance: 3 000; Referee: Alexandru Deaconu (București)

14 March 2010 Matchday 21	FC Vaslui	0–1	Gloria Bistriţa	Vaslui
16:00 EET		(Report)	Hora 22'	Stadium: Municipal; Attendance: 4 000; Referee: Mugurel Drăgănescu (Breaza)

18 March 2010 Matchday 22	Poli Iaşi	1–3	FC Vaslui	Iaşi
16:30 EET	Păun 48'	(Report)	Wesley 37', 82'; Costly 77'	Stadium: Emil Alexandrescu; Attendance: 8 000; Referee: Ovidiu Haţegan (Arad)

22 March 2010 Matchday 23	FC Vaslui	1–0	Rapid	Vaslui
20:30 EET	Papp 5'	(Report)		Stadium: Municipal; Attendance: 8 000; Referee: Robert Dumitru (Brașov)

29 March 2010 Matchday 24	FC Timișoara	0–1	FC Vaslui	Timișoara
17:00 EET		(Report)	Costly 13'	Stadium: Dan Păltinişanu; Attendance: 13 000; Referee: Radu Petrescu (București)

3 April 2010 Matchday 25	FC Vaslui	3–0	Unirea Alba Iulia	Vaslui
17:00 EET	Wesley 47', 61', 89'			Stadium: Municipal; Attendance: 1 000; Referee: Adrian Comănescu (Râmnicu-Vâlcea)

7 April 2010 Matchday 26	Astra Ploiești	0–0	FC Vaslui	Ploiești
16:30 EET				Stadium: Astra; Attendance: 2 000; Referee: Augustus Constantin (Râmnicu-Vâlcea)

10 April 2010 Matchday 27	FC Vaslui	1–1	Unirea Urziceni	Vaslui
21:00 EET	Akakpo 25'		Rusescu 96'	Stadium: Municipal; Attendance: 5 000; Referee: Ovidiu Haţegan (Arad)

19 April 2010 Matchday 28	FC Vaslui	0–1	Universitatea Craiova	Vaslui
18:30 EET			Piţurcă 71'	Stadium: Municipal; Attendance: 5 000; Referee: Robert Dumitru (Brașov)

26 April 2010 Matchday 29	Internaţional Curtea de Argeş	1–2	FC Vaslui	Curtea de Argeş
20:30 EET	Băcilă 45'		Costly 71'; Milisavljević 81'	Stadium: Municipal; Attendance: 1 000; Referee: Ovidiu Haţegan (Arad)

1 May 2010 Matchday 30	FC Vaslui	1–0	Ceahlăul	Vaslui
21:00 EET	Costly 58'			Stadium: Municipal; Attendance: 2 000; Referee: Georgian Ionescu (Buzău)

6 May 2010 Matchday 31	CFR Cluj	0–0	FC Vaslui	Cluj
18:00 EET				Stadium: Dr. Constantin Rădulescu; Attendance: 12 000; Referee: Marius Avram (București)

10 May 2010 Matchday 32	FC Vaslui	2–1	Steaua	Vaslui
20:00 EET	Burdujan 68' (pen.); Papp 82'		Stancu 45+1'	Stadium: Municipal; Attendance: 8 000; Referee: Istvan Kovacs (Carei)

16 May 2010 Matchday 33	Oţelul Galaţi	1–0	FC Vaslui	Galaţi
17:00 EET	Papp 50' (o.g.)			Stadium: Oţelul; Attendance: 4 000; Referee: Alexandru Tudor (București)

22 May 2010 Matchday 34	FC Vaslui	2–0	Dinamo	Vaslui
16:30 EET	Wesley 38' (pen.); Costin 65'			Stadium: Municipal; Attendance: 5 000; Referee: Ionel Ivan (Brăila)

=== UEFA Europa League ===
==== 3rd Qualifying Round ====
30 July 2009	FC Vaslui	2–0	(Cyprus) Omonia Nicosia	Vaslui
21:00 EET	Temwanjera 20', 55'	(Report)		Stadium: Municipal; Attendance: 7 000; Referee: (Scotland) Douglas McDonald

4 August 2009	(Cyprus) Omonia Nicosia	1–1	FC Vaslui	Nicosia
17:00 EET	Żurawski 84' (pen.)	(Report)	Wesley 60'	Stadium: GSP; Attendance: 15 547; Referee: (Italy) Paolo Tagliavento

==== Play-off ====
20 August 2009	FC Vaslui	2–1	(Greece) AEK Athens	Vaslui
21:00 EET	Wesley 28', 83' (pen.)	(Report)	Blanco 69' (pen.)	Stadium: Municipal; Attendance: 9 000; Referee: (France) Said Ennjimi

27 August 2009	(Greece) AEK Athens	3–0	FC Vaslui	Athens
21:00 EET	Manduca 59'; Scocco 74', 79'	(Report)		Stadium: Olympic; Attendance: 19 921; Referee: (Slovenia) Damir Skomina

=== Cupa României ===
23 September 2009 Round of 32	Chimia Brazi	0–5	FC Vaslui	Brazi
16:00 EET		(Report)	Temwanjera 43', 48'; Wesley 67'; Costin 75'; Kirovski 87'	Stadium: Chimia; Attendance: 2 000; Referee: Alexandru Tudor

27 October 2009 Round of 16	Gaz Metan Mediaş	0–1	FC Vaslui	Mediaş
19:00 EET		(Report)	Burdujan 44'	Stadium: Municipal; Attendance: 600; Referee: Augustus Constantin

18 November 2009 Quarterfinals	FC Vaslui	1–0	Internaţional Curtea de Argeş	Vaslui
18:15 EET	Burdujan 87'			Stadium: Municipal; Attendance: 3 000; Referee: Ovidiu Haţegan

25 March 2010 Semifinals	FC Brașov	1–0	FC Vaslui	Brașov
20:30 EET	Ilyeş 5'			Stadium: Tineretului; Attendance: 5 000; Referee: Marius Avram

15 April 2010 Semifinals	FC Vaslui	4–0	FC Brașov	Vaslui
20:15 EET	Costin 27'; Wesley 29'; L. Sânmărtean 53'; Costly 73'			Stadium: Municipal; Attendance: 5 000; Referee: Marius Avram

26 May 2010 Final	FC Vaslui	0–0 (4–5 pen.)	CFR Cluj	Iaşi
21:00 EET	Milisavljević (penalty missed); Zmeu (penalty scored); Costin (penalty scored); Burdujan (penalty scored); Wesley (penalty scored)		Mureşan (penalty scored); N. Dică (penalty scored); Deac (penalty scored); Bud (penalty scored); Cadú (penalty scored)	Stadium: Emil Alexandrescu; Attendance: 11 000; Referee: Alexandru Deaconu (București)
