= List of Romanian football transfers 2009–10 =

This is a list of Romanian football transfers for the 2009–10 transfer windows. Only moves featuring at least one Liga I club are listed.

== Transfers ==
Date	Name	Country	From/Last Club	Moving to	Fee
15 May 2009	Marius Matei	Romania	FC Botoşani	Oţelul Galaţi	€50,000
29 May 2009	Boris Peškovič	Slovakia	Académica	CFR Cluj	Free agent
4 June 2009	Álvaro Pereira	Uruguay	CFR Cluj	Porto	€4.5m
4 June 2009	Cláudio Mejolaro	Brazil	Rapid	F.C. Porto	End of loan
4 June 2009	João Paulo Andrade	Portugal	Rapid	F.C. Porto	End of loan
4 June 2009	Romeo Surdu	Romania	FC Brașov	Steaua	End of loan
4 June 2009	Alin Stoica	Romania	FC Brașov	Vojvodina	Free agent
4 June 2009	Cosmin Vâtcă	Romania	Gaz Metan Medias	Steaua	End of loan
6 June 2009	Eugen Trică	Romania	Anorthosis	CFR Cluj	Free agent
6 June 2009	Milan Perendija	Serbia	FK Rabotnički	Oţelul Galaţi	€100,000
8 June 2009	Njegoš Goločevac	Serbia	FK Sevojno	Oţelul Galaţi	€40,000
12 June 2009	Emil Dică	Romania	Rapid	CFR Cluj	Free agent
17 June 2009	Ilie Iordache	Romania	Pandurii	AEK Athens	Free agent
20 June 2009	Valentin Badea	Romania	Steaua II	Craiova	Free agent
22 June 2009	Gjorgji Mojsov	Macedonia	FK Rabotnički	Oţelul Galaţi	€100,000
23 June 2009	Cosmin Vâtcă	Romania	Steaua	Gaz Metan Mediaş	Loan
24 June 2009	Claudiu Ionescu	Romania	Gloria Buzău	FC Timişoara	€200,000
24 June 2009	Cătălin Vlaicu	Romania	Gloria Buzău	Astra Ploieşti	Free Agent
25 June 2009	Cornel Cernea	Romania	Steaua	Unirea Alba Iulia	Free agent
26 June 2009	Lars Hirschfeld	Canada	CFR Cluj	FC Energie Cottbus	€200,000
30 June 2009	Rafał Grzelak	Poland	Skoda Xanthi	Steaua	Free agent
30 June 2009	Sorin Paraschiv	Romania	Rimini Calcio	Unirea Urziceni	Free agent
2 July 2009	Alexandru Bourceanu	Romania	Oţelul Galaţi	FC Timişoara	€400,000
2 July 2009	Sorin Rădoi	Romania	Unirea Urziceni	Unirea Alba Iulia	Loan
3 July 2009	André Galiassi	Brazil	CFR Cluj	Kasımpaşa S.K.	Loan
4 July 2009	Ricardo Pedriel	Bolivia	Steaua II	Giresunspor	Loan
5 July 2009	Willian Gerlem	Brazil	Farul Constanţa	SC Vaslui	€600,000
6 July 2009	Krum Bibishkov	Bulgaria	Litex Lovech	Steaua	Free agent
17 July 2009	Tiago Filipe Figueiras Gomes	Portugal	Steaua	Hércules CF	Free agent
17 July 2009	Vasile Maftei	Romania	Rapid	Unirea Urziceni	Free agent
17 July 2009	George Ogăraru	Romania	Steaua	AFC Ajax	End of loan
19 July 2009	Florin Lovin	Romania	Steaua II	TSV 1860 München	€500,000
21 July 2009	Francisco Molinero	Spain	Levante UD	Dinamo	Free agent
22 July 2009	Alexandru Piţurcă	Romania	Pandurii	FC Brașov	Free agent
22 July 2009	Constantin Gângioveanu	Romania	Craiova	SC Vaslui	Loan
27 July 2009	Tibor Moldovan	Romania	Farul Constanţa	Unirea Alba Iulia	Loan
4 August 2009	Claudinei Alexandre Aparecido	Brazil	Al-Shabab	CFR Cluj	Loan
6 August 2009	António Semedo	Portugal	Steaua II	Unirea Urziceni	Free Agent
6 August 2009	Dorin Goian	Romania	Steaua	U.S. Palermo	€2m
6 August 2009	Cristian Tănase	Romania	FC Argeş	Steaua	€1.8m
