= Bătești =

Băteşti may refer to several villages in Romania:

- Băteşti, a village in Brazi Commune, Prahova County
- Băteşti, a village administered by Făget town, Timiș County
