= Lamproxynella separata =

Scientific classification
- Kingdom: Animalia
- Phylum: Arthropoda
- Class: Insecta
- Order: Diptera
- Family: Tephritidae
- Subfamily: Tephritinae
- Tribe: Tephritini
- Genus: Lamproxynella
- Species: L. separata

Binomial name
- Lamproxynella separata (Malloch, 1933)

Synonyms
- Trypanea separata Malloch, 1933

Species of fly

Lamproxynella separata is a species of tephritid or fruit flies in the genus Lamproxynella of the family Tephritidae.

== Distribution ==
Argentina, Brazi.
