= Lamproxynella marmorata =

Scientific classification
- Kingdom: Animalia
- Phylum: Arthropoda
- Class: Insecta
- Order: Diptera
- Family: Tephritidae
- Subfamily: Tephritinae
- Tribe: Tephritini
- Genus: Lamproxynella
- Species: L. marmorata

Binomial name
- Lamproxynella marmorata (Blanchard, 1854)

Synonyms
- Acinia marmorata Blanchard, 1854

Species of fly

Lamproxynella marmorata is a species of tephritid or fruit flies in the genus Lamproxynella of the family Tephritidae.

== Distribution ==
Chile.
