= Lucian Sănmărtean =

Romanian footballer (born 1980)

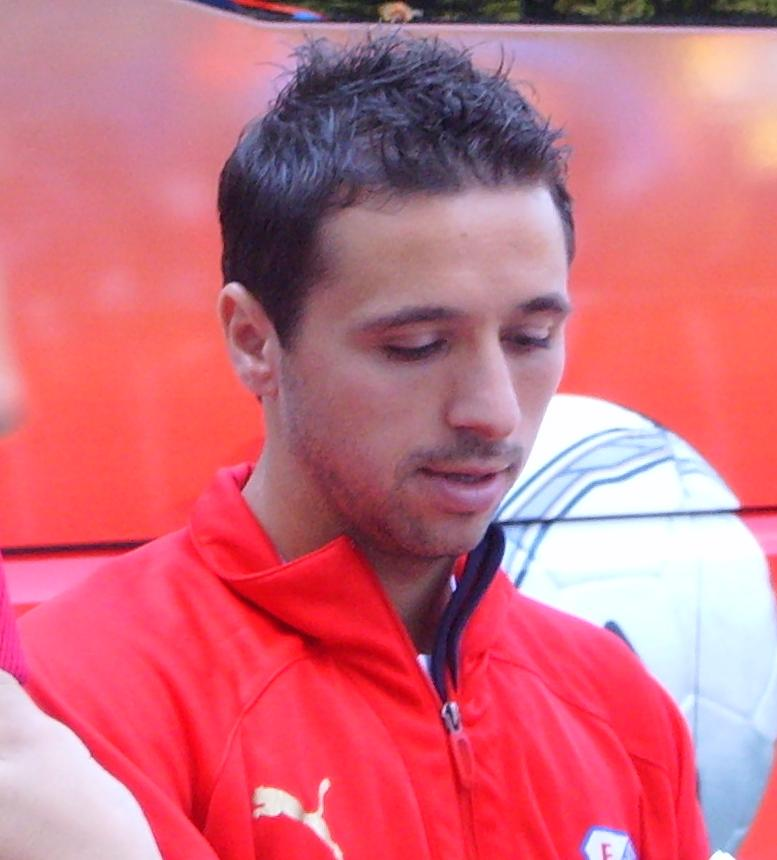
- Sănmărtean with Utrecht in 2007

Personal information
- Full name: Lucian Iulian Sănmărtean
- Date of birth: 13 March 1980 (age 46)
- Place of birth: Bistrița, Romania
- Height: 1.76 m (5 ft 9 in)
- Positions: Attacking midfielder; left winger

Team information
- Current team: Romania U21 (assistant)

Youth career
- 1987–1999: Gloria Bistrița

Senior career*
Years	Team	Apps	(Gls)
1999–2003	Gloria Bistrița	89	(12)
2003–2007	Panathinaikos	24	(1)
2007–2008	Utrecht	17	(0)
2009	Gloria Bistrița	26	(1)
2010–2014	Vaslui	122	(12)
2014–2015	Steaua București	26	(5)
2015–2016	Al-Ittihad	31	(6)
2016–2017	Pandurii Târgu Jiu	17	(2)
2017	Al-Taawoun	8	(0)
2017–2018	Voluntari	5	(0)
Total		364	(39)

International career
2000–2002	Romania U21	12	(1)
2002–2016	Romania	21	(0)

Managerial career
- 2023–: Romania U21 (assistant)
- * Club domestic league appearances and goals

Lucian Iulian Sănmărtean (born 13 March 1980) is a Romanian former professional footballer who played as an attacking midfielder or a left winger, currently he is the assistant coach of the Romania national under-21 team.

Regarded by coach Ioan Sabău as the country's most talented player after Gheorghe Hagi, he was awarded Romanian Footballer of the Year in 2014. Sănmărtean was often praised for his exceptional passing and uncommon dribbling ability, however much of his career was marked by injuries.

Sănmărtean gained his first cap for the Romania national team in November 2002. He amassed 21 games for the nation and represented it at the UEFA Euro 2016.

== Club career ==
=== Gloria Bistrița ===
Born in Bistrița, Sănmărtean started out playing for hometown side Gloria Bistrița, after he was noticed by Constantin Sava. He joined the Vampires' youth academy at the age of six.

Sănmărtean made his Gloria Bistrița first-team debut on 24 April 1999 in a 3–1 win against FC Onești as a substitute. He immediately established himself as one of the most talented young players in Romania. He helped his team, winning the last League Cup ever in 2000, scoring in the penalty shootout. He also contributed to his team finishing 3rd in Divizia A, highest rank ever, for Gloria Bistriţa.

On 7 January 2003, the 23-year-old was seen as a straight replacement for former Rapid București captain Constantin Schumacher after his departure, media reports suggesting a fee of €250,000 being paid for Sânmărtean. Sânmărtean joined Rapid at their winter training camp in Antalya, Turkey, but for reasons which seemed mysterious at the time, he was prevented from playing more than 60 minutes of Rapid's friendly fixtures. On 2 February, he was diagnosed as suffering from type B and type D hepatitis at the Sports Medicine Institute in Bucharest. However, after his return in Bistriţa, his medical file came clean, the disease being invented, to cover the money disagreement between the two chairmen.

=== Panathinaikos ===
On 16 July 2003, Panathinaikos confirmed the €900,000 signing of Sănmărtean. He signed a three-year contract with the option of a further two years with the Athens club. Sânmărtean became the fifth Romanian at Panathinaikos, after Doru Nicolae, Dănuț Lupu, Erik Lincar and Dumitru Mitu. He made his debut for the Greek team on 24 August in a 1–0 win against Skoda Xanthi. His first goal came in the Greek Cup, on 17 December against OFI. On 14 March, he scored his first and only goal in the Alpha Ethniki, against Panionios. In his first season, he won the championship, and the Greek fans called him "Sănmărtean – The little magician". Later he had a conflict with Alberto Malesani and after no matches in more than two years, Sânmărtean was released from his Panathinaikos deal in December 2006.

=== Utrecht ===
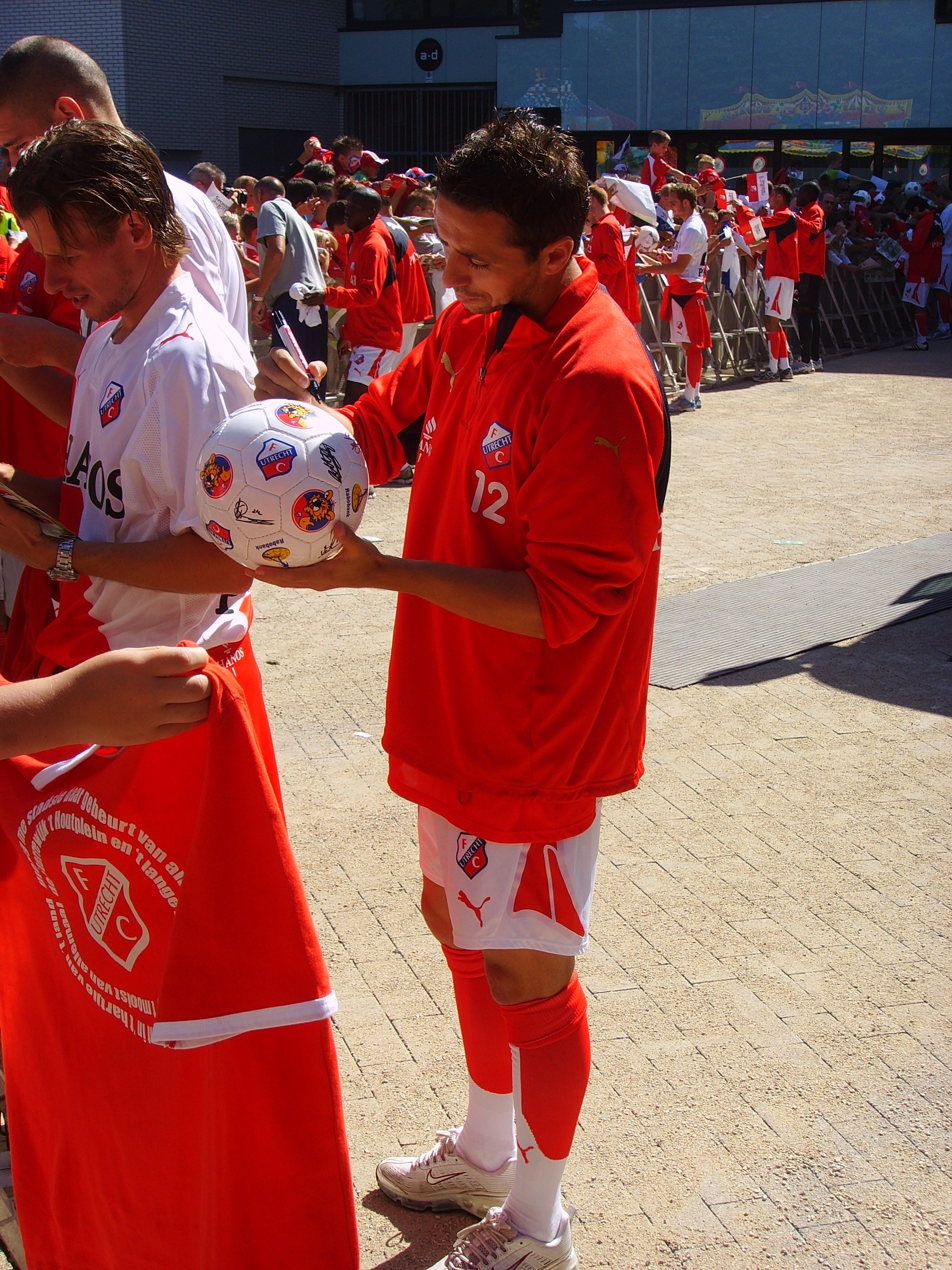
Sănmărtean signing autographs for Utrecht fans in 2007.

On 15 February 2007, Utrecht signed Sănmărtean on a short-term contract with the option of a further two years with the Eredivisie club. The Romanian had been expected to undergo a trial with AZ Alkmaar, but he opted for Utrecht. On completion of the deal, then Utrecht technical director Piet Buter said of Sânmărtean: "We got ourselves a gold mine. He is a Champions League player, I don't think we'll be able to keep him too long for our team." On 26 March, he made his unofficial debut, in the David Di Tommaso Memorial, against AS Monaco, being handed the no. 12 shirt. On 8 April, he was in the startup team against Willem II, counting his Eredivisie debut. On 31 August 2008, Utrecht and Sânmărtean decided to end their cooperation, because of his injuries.

=== Return to Gloria Bistrița ===
After Sănmărtean became a free agent, he started training by himself in Bistrița. On 8 January 2009, he began training with Gloria Bistrița's first team and on 25 February, he signed a short-term contract with his former team. He made his first appearance in his second spell for the club in a league match against Rapid București on 1 March, coming on as a substitute and being handed the no. 10 shirt. On 10 April, Sânmărtean assisted Gloria's first, in a 2–2 draw against CFR Cluj. It was his first assist, since his return to Gloria. On 23 May, he played his 100 match in Liga I for Gloria Bistriţa. In July, Steaua expressed its interest in the Romanian playmaker, but the disagreement over the player's wage, persuaded him to extend his contract with Gloria.

On 19 September, Sănmărtean scored his first goal since December 2004, in a league match against Ceahlăul Piatra Neamț. Following Florin Halagian's appointment, he was given the captain's armband. On 4 October, he obtained his first point since his captain appointment, leading his team to a 1–1 draw against Steaua București. On 3 December, following a conflict with the team's manager Halagian, Gloria Bistriţa released Sănmărtean.

=== Vaslui ===
Shortly after, Sănmărtean signed a 2.5-year contract with the Moldavian team FC Vaslui. On 11 February, Vaslui signed his brother, Dinu Sânmărtean. On 21 February, he made his league debut, against Gaz Metan Mediaş, being handed the no. 18 shirt. On 18 March, he provided his first assist, assisting Carlo Costly for 2–1 against Poli Iași, from a corner kick. Four days later, he played for 19 minutes for the first time alongside his brother for Vaslui, Dinu coming in as a substitute for Hugo Luz in the 53rd minute, and Sănmărtean being substitute out in the 72nd minute. On 15 April, he scored for the first time for his new team, against FC Braşov in the Romanian Cup, scoring Vaslui's third from a 27-yard free kick. Vaslui went on to win 4–0, and secured a spot in the Romanian Cup Final. He helped his team finishing third in Liga I, the highest rank ever for Vaslui. On 26 May, he was in the startup team against CFR Cluj, in the Romanian Cup Final, but he was substituted at half time, due to a minor injury. Vaslui eventually lost the cup in the penalty shootout. The 2009–10 campaign, represented Sănmărtean's first season, from the past six years, without any major injury.

The 2010–11 season started with Vaslui's failed attempt to qualify for the first time in Europa League's Group Stages after being defeated 0–2 by French side Lille OSC in the play-off stage. On 23 September, he received his first red card since his arrival at the club, in a cup match against ALRO Slatina. He scored his first league goal, with a close range shot against CFR Cluj. His second goal came on 1 April 2011, in a 2–0 win against Unirea Urziceni. He scored Vaslui's first with a 17-yard shot just outside the box, maintaining his team in the title chase. On 15 May, he captained Vaslui for the first time, leading his team to a 4–2 win in a league match against Sportul Studenţesc. In his second year at the club, he managed to finish third in Liga I for the second year in a row. Sănmărtean was the top assister in Liga I, providing 10 assists for his team.

Although he missed the entire pre-season due to an injury, he was a starter against Rapid București, in Vaslui's opening match. On 18 August, in the 2–0 victory against Sparta Prague, he created the first goal and assisted the second, leading his team to a historical qualification in Europa League's Group Stages. On 11 September, Sânmărtean scored his club's third goal in a 3–1 home league victory over Dinamo Bucuresti. On 18 November, Sânmărtean signed a new three-year contract with SC Vaslui. On 8 December, he received his first personal award, lifting the Midfielder of the Year Award at the Fanatik Awards Ceremony. On 19 December, he was awarded the Liga I Footballer of The Year award from LPF and FRF at the Romanian Football Ceremony. On 22 December, he finished second on the vote for Gazeta Sporturilor's Romanian Footballer of the Year Award, behind Gabriel Torje. He was also voted The Best Romanian Footballer in Liga I by readers of ProSport. On 9 March 2012, he closed the scoreboard in the 4–0 home league win against Concordia Chiajna, scoring the fourth goal. On 15 March, he assisted three times in the 3–2 away victory against Oţelul Galaţi, helping his team qualifying in the Romanian Cup semi-finals, for the third time in the last four years.

=== Steaua București ===
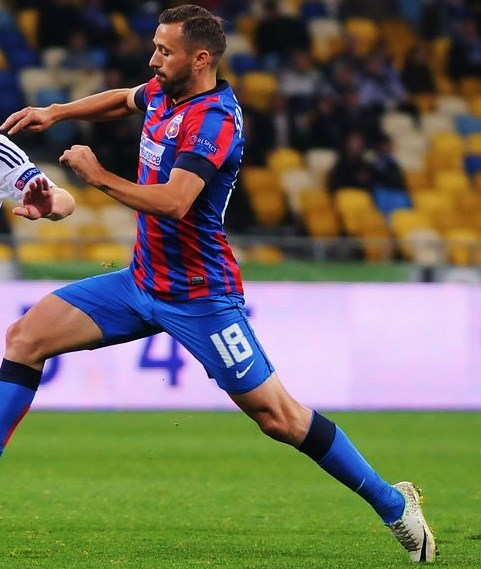
Sânmărtean playing for Steaua București, October 2014.

In February 2014, Sănmărtean signed a one-year and a half deal with Liga I champions Steaua București. He scored on his club debut from a penalty kick in the 44th minute as Steaua won 4–0 over Concordia Chiajna. He won his first domestic league title in Romania under the management of Laurențiu Reghecampf during his first season at the club.

=== Later years ===
On 3 January 2015, Sănmărtean signed a contract with Al-Ittihad, when he entered his final six months of the deal with Steaua. The two clubs reached an agreement to release the player before his contract with Steaua ended, thus he joined Al-Ittihad in January 2015.

On 22 November 2017, Sănmărtean announced his football return after signing with FC Voluntari. He retired from football in July 2018, after one season Voluntari.

== International career ==
A former Romania U-21 captain, Sânmărtean earned his first cap in an exhibition match against Croatia on 20 November 2002. Because of the hepatitis rumours he lost for a few months the national team, but he was recalled for the friendly against Lithuania. On 23 May 2011, he was recalled for the Euro 2012 qualifying match against Bosnia and Herzegovina. However, following Victor Piturca's appointment as Romanian national team's coach, Sânmărtean was not called for the friendly against San Marino, despite his good shape. The Romanian fans started a petition called "Sânmărtean at the National team" on Facebook but it had no effect because he was not included in the squad once again. Nevertheless, Lucian was called up for the qualifying matches vs. Belarus and Albania in October 2011. He was also called up for Euro 2016 in France, making one appearance as Romania were eliminated in the group stage.

He officially announced his retirement from the national team on 13 June 2017 before Romania's match against Chile.

== Personal life ==
In 2010, he married Romanian sprinter and breast cancer survivor Maria Rus, with whom he has a daughter.

His younger brother Dinu was also a professional footballer. They have played together for both Gloria Bistriţa and Vaslui.

After his retirement, he became a football pundit, joining Eurosport Romania's Premier League Show, a program that covers the top English football league matches.

== Career statistics ==
=== Club ===
Appearances and goals by club, season and competition
Club	Season	League			National cup (Note: Includes Cupa României, Greek Cup, King's Cup)		League cup (Note: Includes Cupa Ligii, Saudi Crown Prince Cup)		Continental		Other		Total	
Club	Season	Division	Apps	Goals	Apps	Goals	Apps	Goals	Apps	Goals	Apps	Goals	Apps	Goals
Gloria Bistriţa	1998–99	Divizia A	1	0	—		—		—		—		1	0
Gloria Bistriţa	1999–00	Divizia A	9	0	2	0	2	1	—		—		13	1
Gloria Bistriţa	2000–01	Divizia A	26	2	2	0	—		—		—		28	2
Gloria Bistriţa	2001–02	Divizia A	27	3	2	1	—		1 (Note: Appearances in UEFA Intertoto Cup)	0	—		30	4
Gloria Bistriţa	2002–03	Divizia A	26	7	1	0	—		3	1	—		30	8
Gloria Bistriţa	2003–04	Divizia A	—		—		—		3	3	—		3	3
Gloria Bistriţa	Total		89	12	7	1	2	1	7	4	—		105	18
Panathinaikos	2003–04	Alpha Ethniki	18	1	5	1	—		4 (Note: Appearances in UEFA Champions League)	0	—		27	2
Panathinaikos	2004–05	Alpha Ethniki	6	0	1	0	—		1	1	—		7	1
Panathinaikos	2005–06	Alpha Ethniki	0	0	0	0	—		0	0	—		0	0
Panathinaikos	2006–07	Super League Greece	0	0	0	0	—		0	0	—		0	0
Panathinaikos	Total		24	1	6	1	—		5	1	—		35	3
Utrecht	2006–07	Eredivisie	1	0	0	0	—		—		1 (Note: Appearance in Eredivisie European play-offs)	0	2	0
Utrecht	2007–08	Eredivisie	14	0	0	0	—		0	0	—		14	0
Utrecht	2008–09	Eredivisie	1	0	—		—		—		—		1	0
Utrecht	Total		16	0	0	0	—		0	0	1	0	17	0
Gloria Bistriţa	2008–09	Liga I	11	0	0	0	—		—		—		11	0
Gloria Bistriţa	2009–10	Liga I	15	1	1	0	—		—		—		16	1
Gloria Bistriţa	Total		26	1	1	0	—		—		—		27	1
Vaslui	2009–10	Liga I	16	0	3	1	—		—		—		19	1
Vaslui	2010–11	Liga I	29	2	1	0	—		2 (Note: Appearances in UEFA Europa League)	0	—		32	2
Vaslui	2011–12	Liga I	31	2	4	0	—		10 (Note: Two appearances in UEFA Champions League, eight appearances in UEFA Europa League)	0	—		45	2
Vaslui	2012–13	Liga I	29	7	1	0	—		4 (Note: Two appearances in UEFA Champions League, two appearances in UEFA Europa League)	0	—		34	7
Vaslui	2013–14	Liga I	17	1	3	0	—		—		—		20	1
Vaslui	Total		122	12	12	1	—		16	0	—		150	13
Steaua București	2013–14	Liga I	12	2	3	0	—		—		—		15	2
Steaua București	2014–15	Liga I	14	3	1	0	1	0	11 (Note: Five appearances in UEFA Champions League, six appearances and one goal in UEFA Europa League)	1	0	0	27	4
Steaua București	Total		26	5	4	0	1	0	11	1	0	0	42	6
Al-Ittihad	2014–15	Saudi Professional League	11	0	4	0	—		—		—		15	0
Al-Ittihad	2015–16	Saudi Professional League	20	6	3	2	4	2	6 (Note: Appearances in AFC Champions League)	1	—		33	11
Al-Ittihad	Total		31	6	7	2	4	2	6	1	—		48	11
Pandurii Târgu Jiu	2016–17	Liga I	17	2	0	0	0	0	0	0	—		17	2
Al-Taawoun	2016–17	Saudi Professional League	8	0	3	1	0	0	5	0	—		16	1
Voluntari	2017–18	Liga I	5	0	—		—		—		0	0	5	0
Career total			364	39	40	6	7	3	50	7	1	0	462	55

=== International ===
Appearances and goals by national team and year
National team	Year	Apps	Goals
Romania	2002	1	0
Romania	2003	2	0
Romania	2011	4	0
Romania	2014	4	0
Romania	2015	5	0
Romania	2016	5	0
Total		21	0

== Honours ==
Gloria Bistrita

- Cupa Ligii: 2000

Panathinaikos

- Alpha Ethniki: 2003–04
- Greek Cup: 2003–04

Vaslui

- Cupa României runner-up: 2009–10

Steaua București

- Liga I: 2013–14, 2014–15
- Supercupa României runner-up: 2014

Individual

- Gazeta Sporturilor Romanian Footballer of the Year: 2014; runner-up: 2011
