= Marko Ljubinković =

Serbian footballer

Personal information
- Date of birth: 7 December 1981 (age 44)
- Place of birth: Belgrade, SFR Yugoslavia
- Height: 1.81 m (5 ft 11 in)
- Position: Midfielder

Youth career
- Red Star Belgrade

Senior career*
| Years | Team | Apps | (Gls) |
| 2001–2002 | Radnički Kragujevac | 27 | (2) |
| 2002–2005 | Rad | 104 | (11) |
| 2006–2010 | Vaslui | 94 | (24) |
| 2010–2011 | Sloboda Point Sevojno | 4 | (3) |
| 2011 | Anorthosis Famagusta | 16 | (0) |
| 2011–2012 | Vojvodina | 5 | (1) |
| 2012 | Changchun Yatai | 12 | (1) |
| 2012 | Rad | 8 | (0) |
| 2013 | Radnički Niš | 20 | (3) |
| Total | | 290 | (45) |
- * Club domestic league appearances and goals

Marko Ljubinković (Serbian Cyrillic: Марко Љубинковић; born 7 December 1981) is a Serbian former footballer.

== Career ==
He started his career at Red Star Belgrade youth, but he did not play for the team. In 2001, he joined Radnički Kragujevac.

In 2006, he was bought by FC Vaslui. At first, he played as a defensive midfielder, and he scored only 2 goals in the 2006–07 season. However, Mircea Rednic wanted him on his team, offering 1.5 million dollars for Ljubinković and Ștefan Mardare, but Adrian Porumboiu declined the offer. In the next season, Dorinel Munteanu took Ljubinković's role in the field, letting him a free role. He scored in the opening match, a 2–2 draw against UTA Arad. He was also, the first player who scored in the new championship. In the second game of the season, he failed to score, but he was one of the most dangerous Vaslui player in the 2–0 win against the current champions Dinamo București. From the 3rd until the 11th game, he scored each game, being able to be in the front of the goalscorers. In the first game of the 2008, he scored again against Dacia Mioveni, in a 3–0 win. He scored the 100th goal for Vaslui in Liga I, in a 3–0 victory against Poli Timișoara. He finished on the 3rd position of the top-scorers, with 16 goals. In the new season, he scored at the first game, against Steaua București, in a 1–0 win. On 21 March 2009, he scored a goal from almost 35 m against Farul. He has scored, at the moment, only 6 goals, in the new season. In the 2009–10, after a conflict with Marius Lăcătuș, he was sent to the second team, but he did not play. In the summer, 2010 he managed to release his contract with Vaslui. After brief spells with Serbian side Sloboda Point Sevojno and Cypriots Αnorthosis, at the end of August 2011 he signed a two-year deal with another Serbian SuperLiga side FK Vojvodina.

== Career statistics ==
Appearances and goals by club, season and competition
| Club | Season | League | | | Cup | | Continental | | Other | | Total | |
| Club | Season | Division | Apps | Goals | Apps | Goals | Apps | Goals | Apps | Goals | Apps | Goals |
|---|---|---|---|---|---|---|---|---|---|---|---|---|
| Radnički Kragujevac | 2001–02 | First League of FR Yugoslavia | 27 | 2 | 0 | 0 | — | | — | | 27 | 2 |
| Rad | 2002–03 | First League of Serbia and Montenegro | 26 | 1 | 0 | 0 | — | | — | | 26 | 1 |
| Rad | 2003–04 | Second League of Serbia and Montenegro | 27 | 2 | 0 | 0 | — | | — | | 27 | 2 |
| Rad | 2004–05 | Second League of Serbia and Montenegro | 37 | 7 | 0 | 0 | — | | — | | 37 | 7 |
| Rad | 2005–06 | Serbia and Montenegro SuperLiga | 14 | 1 | 0 | 0 | — | | — | | 14 | 1 |
| Rad | Total | | 104 | 11 | 0 | 0 | — | | — | | 104 | 11 |
| Vaslui | 2006–07 | Liga I | 28 | 2 | 0 | 0 | — | | — | | 28 | 2 |
| Vaslui | 2007–08 | Liga I | 30 | 16 | 0 | 0 | — | | — | | 30 | 16 |
| Vaslui | 2008–09 | Liga I | 28 | 6 | 1 | 0 | 6 | 0 | — | | 35 | 6 |
| Vaslui | 2009–10 | Liga I | 8 | 0 | 0 | 0 | 3 | 0 | — | | 11 | 0 |
| Vaslui | Total | | 94 | 24 | 1 | 0 | 9 | 0 | — | | 104 | 24 |
| Sloboda Point Sevojno | 2010–11 | Serbian SuperLiga | 4 | 3 | 0 | 0 | — | | — | | 4 | 3 |
| Anorthosis Famagusta | 2010–11 | Cypriot First Division | 16 | 0 | — | | — | | — | | 16 | 0 |
| Vojvodina | 2011–12 | Serbian SuperLiga | 5 | 1 | 1 | 0 | — | | — | | 6 | 1 |
| Changchun Yatai | 2012 | Chinese Super League | 12 | 1 | 1 | 2 | — | | — | | 13 | 3 |
| Rad | 2012–13 | Serbian SuperLiga | 8 | 0 | 2 | 1 | — | | — | | 10 | 1 |
| Radnički Niš | 2012–13 | Serbian SuperLiga | 12 | 3 | 0 | 0 | — | | — | | 12 | 3 |
| Radnički Niš | 2013–14 | Serbian SuperLiga | 8 | 0 | 2 | 0 | — | | — | | 10 | 0 |
| Radnički Niš | Total | | 20 | 3 | 2 | 0 | — | | — | | 22 | 3 |
| Career total | | | 290 | 45 | 6 | 3 | 9 | 0 | 0 | 0 | 305 | 48 |

== Honours ==
=== Vaslui ===
- UEFA Intertoto Cup
  - Winner: 2008

=== Individual ===
- Scored the 100th goal for Vaslui in Liga I, 20 March 2008 vs Poli Timișoara
- Vaslui top scorer: 2007–08
- Vaslui player of the season: 2007–08
