= Lamproxynella apotela =

Scientific classification
- Kingdom: Animalia
- Phylum: Arthropoda
- Class: Insecta
- Order: Diptera
- Family: Tephritidae
- Subfamily: Tephritinae
- Tribe: Tephritini
- Genus: Lamproxynella
- Species: L. apotela

Binomial name
- Lamproxynella apotela Hendel, 1914

Synonyms
- Trypanea apotela Hendel, 1914

Species of fly

Lamproxynella apotela is a species of tephritid or fruit flies in the genus Lamproxynella of the family Tephritidae.

== Distribution ==
Venezuela.
