= Stadionul Chimia =

Stadium in Brazil

- Interactive map of Stadionul Chimia
- Location: Brazi, Romania
- Coordinates: 44°52′58″N 26°0′51″E
- Owner: Brazi Municipality
- Operator: CS Brazi
- Capacity: 2,000
- Surface: Grass

Tenants
- CS Brazi (1968–present); CS Brazi (W) (2002–present); Fortuna Poiana Câmpina (2010–2013)

Stadionul Chimia is a multi-purpose stadium, frequently used for football. It is located in Brazi. The stadium holds 2,000 people.
