= Lamproxynella euarestina =

Scientific classification
- Kingdom: Animalia
- Phylum: Arthropoda
- Class: Insecta
- Order: Diptera
- Family: Tephritidae
- Subfamily: Tephritinae
- Tribe: Tephritini
- Genus: Lamproxynella
- Species: L. euarestina

Binomial name
- Lamproxynella euarestina (Hendel, 1914)

Synonyms
- Euribia euarestina Hendel, 1914

Species of fly

Lamproxynella euarestina is a species of tephritid or fruit flies in the genus Lamproxynella of the family Tephritidae.

== Distribution ==
Ecuador, Peru, Chile.
