= Lamproxynella =

Scientific classification
- Kingdom: Animalia
- Phylum: Arthropoda
- Class: Insecta
- Order: Diptera
- Family: Tephritidae
- Subfamily: Tephritinae
- Tribe: Tephritini
- Genus: Lamproxynella; Hering, 1941

Type species
- Euribia heliodes Hendel, 1914

Genus of flies

Lamproxynella is a genus of tephritid or fruit flies in the family Tephritidae.

== Species ==
- Lamproxynella apotela (Hendel, 1914)
- Lamproxynella dyscola (Hendel, 1914)
- Lamproxynella euarestina (Hendel, 1914)
- Lamproxynella fucatella (Hendel, 1914)
- Lamproxynella heliodes (Hendel, 1914)
- Lamproxynella marmorata (Blanchard, 1854)
- Lamproxynella separata (Malloch, 1933)
- Lamproxynella unicolor (Walker, 1836)
