= Roberto Delgado (footballer) =

Spanish footballer

Personal information
- Full name: Roberto Alfonso Delgado
- Date of birth: 7 May 1986 (age 40)
- Place of birth: Tenerife, Spain
- Height: 1.86 m (6 ft 1 in)
- Position: Winger

Youth career
- Lazio

Senior career*
Years	Team	Apps	(Gls)
2003–2005	Lazio	5	(0)
2005	SPAL	18	(3)
2006–2009	Potenza	70	(7)
2009–2010	Vaslui	22	(2)
2010–2011	Universitatea Cluj	28	(2)
2011	Pergocrema	5	(0)
2012	Delta Tulcea	5	(0)
2012–2013	San Cesareo	32	(9)
2013	Santa Maria Mole Marino	13	(6)
2014	Palestrina	31	(10)
2014–2015	Cynthia	14	(6)
2015	Trastevere	12	(3)
2015–2016	Serpentara	20	(8)
2016	Albalonga	15	(6)
2016–2017	Flaminia	16	(5)
2017–2019	Unipomezia Virtus		
2019–2020	Vis Artena	23	(13)
2020–2022	Unipomezia Virtus		
2022	Campus Eur		
2022–2023	GS Fiano Romano		
2023–2025	Unipomezia Virtus		
- * Club domestic league appearances and goals

Roberto Alfonso Delgado (born 7 May 1986) is a Spanish former footballer.

Club	Season	League		Cup		Europe		Other		Total	
Club	Season	Apps	Goals	Apps	Goals	Apps	Goals	Apps	Goals	Apps	Goals
Lazio	2003–04	4	0	0	0	0	0	0	0	4	0
Lazio	2004–05	1	0	0	0	2	0	0	0	3	0
Lazio	Total	5	0	0	0	2	0	0	0	7	0
SPAL	2005–06	9	0	-	-	0	0	0	0	9	0
Potenza	2005–06	6	0	-	-	0	0	0	0	6	0
Potenza	2006–07	29	4	0	0	0	0	0	0	29	4
Potenza	2007–08	26	3	0	0	0	0	0	0	26	3
Potenza	2008–09	9	0	0	0	2	0	0	0	9	0
Potenza	Total	70	7	-	-	0	0	0	0	70	7
SC Vaslui	2009–10	22	2	3	0	0	0	0	0	25	2
Universitatea Cluj	2010–11	14	1	0	0	0	0	0	0	14	1
Career total		120	10	3	0	2	0	0	0	125	10

Statistics accurate as of match played 3 August 2010

== Career Honours ==
- Cupa României
  - Runner-up: 2010
