= Lamproxynella heliodes =

Scientific classification
- Kingdom: Animalia
- Phylum: Arthropoda
- Class: Insecta
- Order: Diptera
- Family: Tephritidae
- Subfamily: Tephritinae
- Tribe: Tephritini
- Genus: Lamproxynella
- Species: L. heliodes

Binomial name
- Lamproxynella heliodes (Hendel, 1914)

Synonyms
- Euribia heliodes Hendel, 1914; Lamproxynella heloides Aczél, 1950

Species of fly

Lamproxynella heliodes is a species of tephritid or fruit flies in the genus Lamproxynella of the family Tephritidae.

== Distribution ==
Bolivia, Peru, Chile.
