= Lamproxynella unicolor =

Scientific classification
- Kingdom: Animalia
- Phylum: Arthropoda
- Class: Insecta
- Order: Diptera
- Family: Tephritidae
- Subfamily: Tephritinae
- Tribe: Tephritini
- Genus: Lamproxynella
- Species: L. unicolor

Binomial name
- Lamproxynella unicolor (Walker, 1836)

Synonyms
- Tephritis unicolor Walker, 1836

Species of fly

Lamproxynella unicolor is a species of tephritid or fruit flies in the genus Lamproxynella of the family Tephritidae.

== Distribution ==
Argentina, Chile.
