= Stéphane Zubar =

Guadeloupean footballer (born 1986)

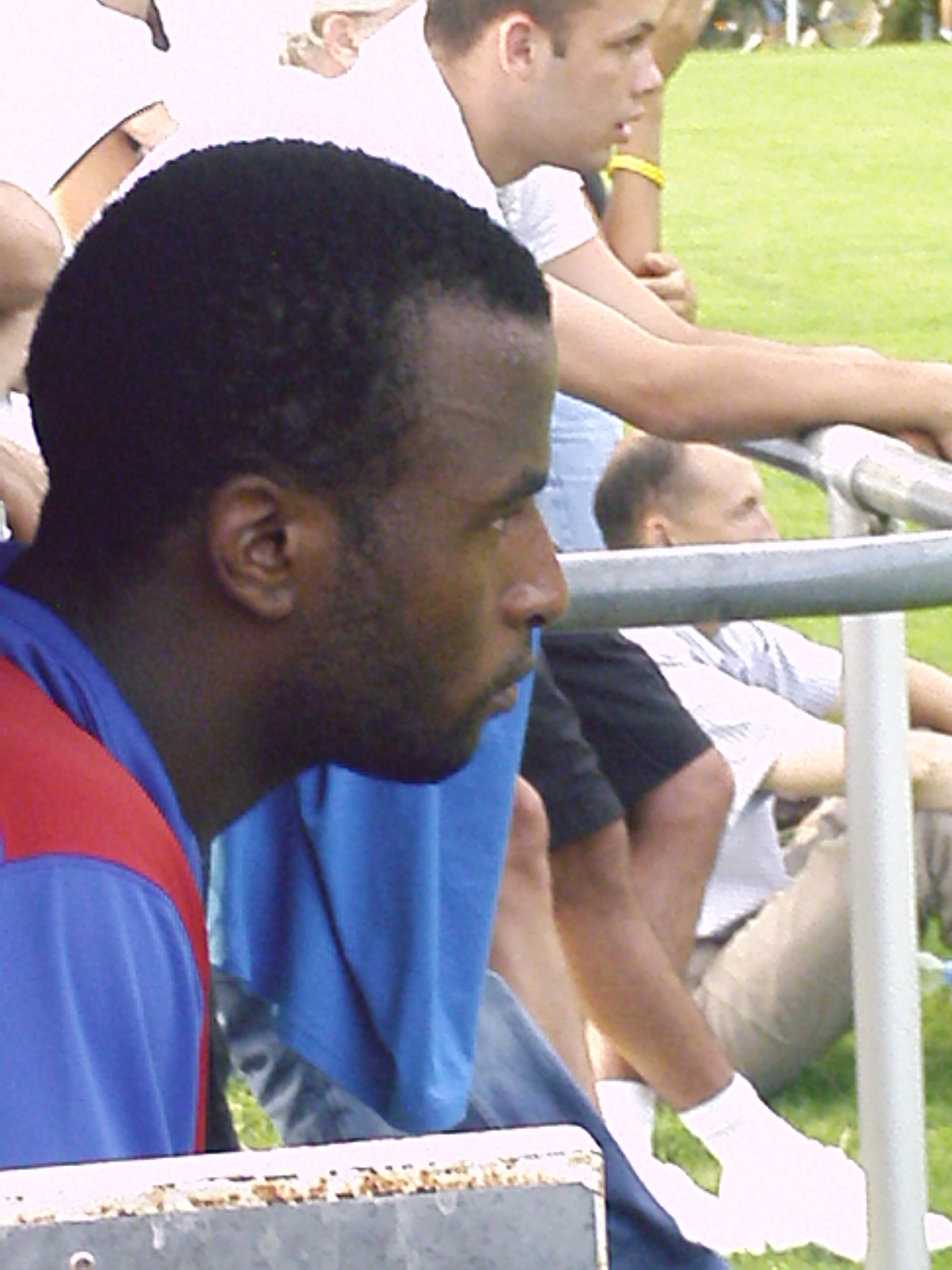
- Zubar as a Caen player in 2008

Personal information
- Full name: Stéphane Zubar
- Date of birth: 9 October 1986 (age 40)
- Place of birth: Pointe-à-Pitre, Guadeloupe
- Height: 1.87 m (6 ft 2 in)
- Position: Defender

Youth career
- 2003–2005: Caen

Senior career*
Years	Team	Apps	(Gls)
2005–2009	Caen B (Note: The Caen B appearances and goals only cover the 2007–08 and 2008–09 seasons.)	18	(1)
2006–2009	Caen	0	(0)
2007	→ Pau (loan)	10	(0)
2008	→ Brussels (loan)	11	(0)
2009–2010	Vaslui	35	(1)
2010–2011	Plymouth Argyle	33	(2)
2011–2016	AFC Bournemouth	24	(0)
2013	→ Bury (loan)	6	(0)
2014	→ Port Vale (loan)	2	(0)
2014–2015	→ York City (loan)	23	(2)
2015	→ York City (loan)	4	(0)
2016–2017	Weymouth	36	(4)
2017	Yeovil Town	0	(0)
2017–2020	Weymouth	83	(7)
2020	Gosport Borough	1	(0)
2020–2022	A.F.C. Totton	19	(1)
2022–202?	Sporting Club Parley FC		
Total		305	(18)

International career
2011	Guadeloupe	2	(0)
- * Club domestic league appearances and goals

Stéphane Zubar (born 9 October 1986) is a Guadeloupean former professional footballer who played as a defender. He is the younger brother of Ronald Zubar and cousin of Claude Dielna, both of whom are footballers.

Zubar began his career at Caen but never made a first-team appearance and was released from the club after spells on loan at Championnat National club Pau and Belgian First Division club Brussels. He spent the 2009–10 season with Romanian Liga I club Vaslui, where he experienced European football after helping the club to the 2010 Cupa României final. Zubar signed with English club Plymouth Argyle in November 2010 and moved on to AFC Bournemouth in September 2011. He was loaned out to Bury in January 2013 and to Port Vale in September 2014. He joined League Two club York City in November 2014, where he played for the rest of 2014–15. Zubar returned to York on loan in August 2015 but returned to Bournemouth after he suffered a cruciate ligament injury. He joined Weymouth on non-contract terms in August 2016 before returning to full-time professional football with Yeovil Town in June 2017, but after suffering another knee injury left without making an appearance. He returned to Weymouth and helped the club to two successive promotions: winning the Southern League Premier Division South title in 2018–19 and the National League South play-offs in 2020, before joining A.F.C. Totton via Gosport Borough in October 2020. He later played for Sporting Club Baie-Mahault in his native Guadeloupe.

== Club career ==
=== Caen ===
Born in Pointe-à-Pitre, Guadeloupe, Zubar began his career with Caen at the start of the 2003–04 season, following in the footsteps of his older brother Ronald. He signed a three-year professional contract with Caen in the summer of 2006. He spent time on loan with Championnat National club Pau in 2007 and Belgian First Division club Brussels in 2008, but did not make a first-team appearance for Caen.

=== Vaslui ===
Zubar was transferred to Romanian Liga I club Vaslui in 2009, where he made his debut for the club in a 1–1 draw against Steaua București on 27 February. He scored his first goal for the "Yellow-Greens" in a 2–2 draw with Brașov at the Municipal. He helped the club to finish third in Liga I and reach the final of the Cupa României during 2009–10, where Zubar was not used in the substitute bench, only to lose to Cluj 5–4 on penalties in the final.

=== Plymouth Argyle ===
He joined English League One club Plymouth Argyle on a trial during the summer of 2010, following a recommendation from Mick McCarthy. His trial at Plymouth was successful and he signed for club after international clearance was granted on 16 November. He made his debut four days later as the "Pilgrims" lost 2–1 to Brentford at Home Park. Initially played at right-back, he went on to form a successful centre-back partnership with Curtis Nelson. On 28 December, Zubar scored his first goal in England as Plymouth drew 1–1 with Notts County. Seven days later he scored his second goal for Plymouth in a 3–2 win over Bristol Rovers. On 11 January 2012, Zubar received a red card after a second bookable offence in a 3–2 defeat to Huddersfield Town. At the end of 2010–11 Argyle were relegated to League Two and Zubar was the only player to be offered a new (two-year) contract by a club, which he signed in July. However, he had his contract with the club terminated at the end of August, citing "personal reasons"; club chairman Peter Ridsdale said that "Stephane will remain a friend of the club and leaves with our best wishes".

"Because of the situation at Plymouth when I was manager, with regards being paid, the lad had forgone a lot of money in Romania and felt he just couldn’t do it any more. We agreed by mutual consent to let him go, but it was a blow for me because he is a good character and he is a good player."

— Manager Peter Reid explained the circumstances of Zubar's departure.

=== AFC Bournemouth ===
In September 2011, Zubar joined AFC Bournemouth on a free transfer, signing a one-year contract with the option for a second, having spent time with the club on trial. He made his League One debut for the club on 24 September in a 2–1 defeat to Hartlepool United at Dean Court. He scored an own goal on 25 October which cost the "Cherries" two points in a 1–1 draw at Colchester United. On 12 November, Zubar scored his first goal for Bournemouth in a 3–3 draw with Gillingham in the FA Cup. Some impressive performance for the club kept him in the first-team at the expense of Adam Barrett and led manager Lee Bradbury to offer him a new three-and-a-half-year contract, which was signed in February 2012.

He fell out of favour under new manager Eddie Howe, and signed for Kevin Blackwell's Bury on loan until the end of 2012–13 on 24 January 2013. Despite only playing six games for the "Shakers" Blackwell said that the Gigg Lane faithful had appreciated Zubar's contribution and "have become massive Zubar fans". However, he picked up an anterior cruciate knee injury in March and was ruled out of action for nine months. Bournemouth were promoted to the Championship at the end of 2012–13, and the higher standard of football and his injury effectively ruled him out of action throughout 2013–14. He was expected to join Bury on a free transfer in July 2013, but a deal was never completed.

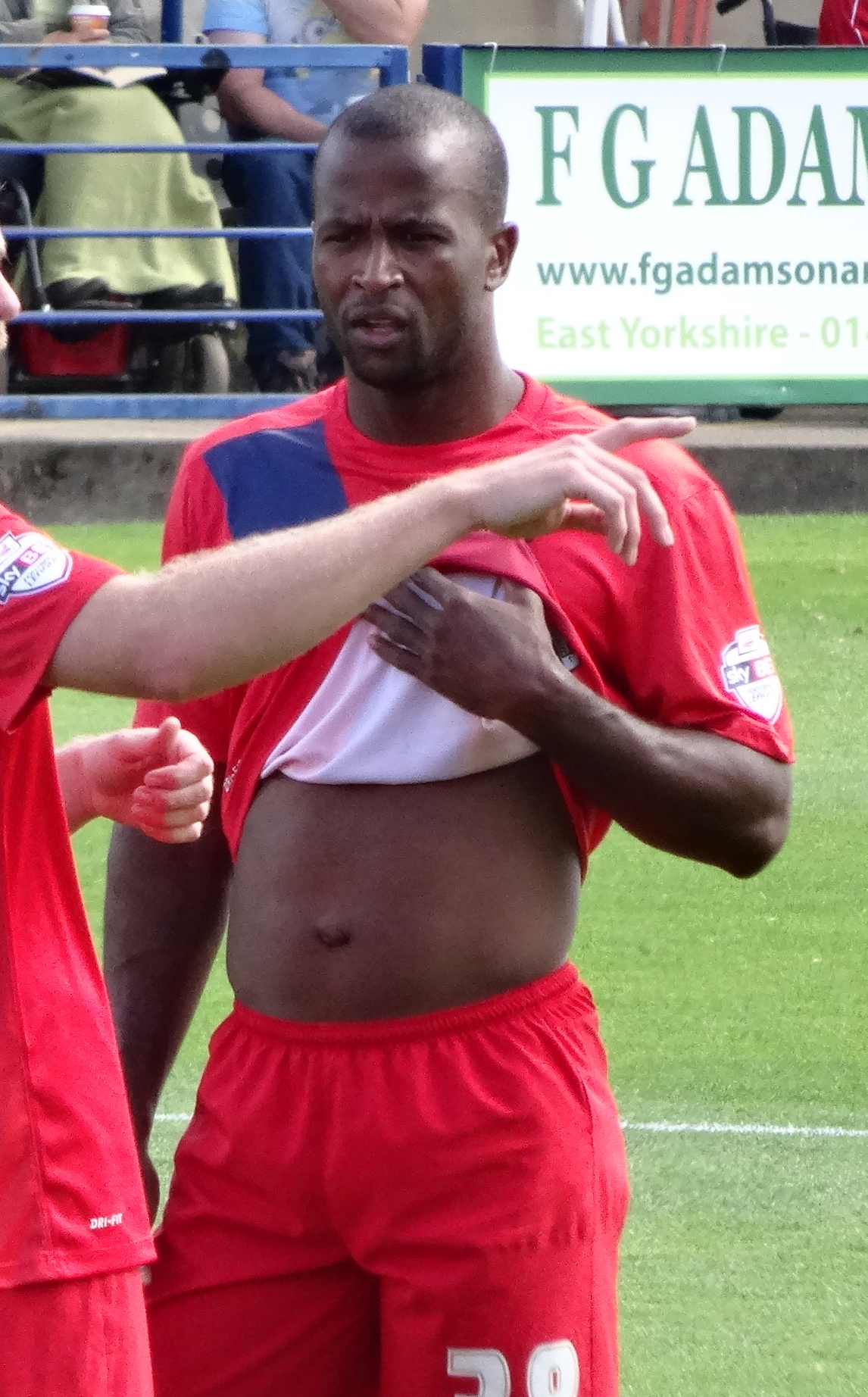
Zubar playing for York City in 2015

Zubar had trials with Partick Thistle and Crewe Alexandra in August/September 2014. He joined League One club Port Vale on a one-month loan on 29 September. He made three appearances for the "Valiants", and was sent off in the last of these games for striking out at Preston North End's Joe Garner in a 2–0 defeat at Deepdale. He did not return to the starting line-up and manager Rob Page elected not to extend his loan spell at Vale Park. Zubar instead joined Russ Wilcox's York City on a two-month loan. The loan was extended to the end of 2014–15 and he impressed in his performances at Bootham Crescent enough to warrant speculation in the local press that he would be offered a contract by York in the summer.

Despite having not played for Bournemouth for more than two-and-a-half-years, the club's promotion to the Premier League in May 2015 triggered a one-year extension to his contract. Zubar rejoined York on a one-month loan on 7 August 2015, and made his debut a day later in a 3–0 away defeat to Wycombe Wanderers, the opening match of 2015–16. He suffered cruciate ligament damage during York's 0–0 away draw with Exeter City on 22 August 2015, which was expected to rule him out for the season. He returned to Bournemouth for treatment, ending his loan at York on five appearances.

=== Weymouth ===
Zubar had a trial with Dundee United, playing two closed-door friendlies in June and July 2016. He joined Southern League Premier Division club Weymouth on non-contract terms in August 2016. He made 46 appearances across the 2016–17 season, scoring five goals.

=== Yeovil Town ===
On 28 June 2017, Zubar joined League Two club Yeovil Town on a one-year contract. After failing to make a competitive appearance due to injury Zubar was released by Yeovil, on 8 August 2017.

=== Later career ===
Having recovered from his knee injury Zubar returned to Southern League Premier Division club Weymouth in November 2017, and made his second debut for the Terras in a 2–0 victory over Biggleswade Town. Weymouth ended the season in fifth-place, losing to King's Lynn Town in the play-off semi-finals. He signed a new one-year contract in May 2018. He scored seven goals in 45 appearances during the 2018–19 season, helping Mark Molesley's side to win promotion as champions. He scored one goal in 22 appearances in the 2019–20 National League South season, which was permanently suspended on 26 March due to the COVID-19 pandemic in England, with Weymouth in the play-offs in third-place. Weymouth went on to secure promotion after beating Dartford on penalties in the play-off final; Zubar was an unused substitute in the game. He announced his retirement on 17 September 2020. However, two days later he signed for Gosport Borough. On 2 October 2020, he joined Southern League Division One South club A.F.C. Totton. He made seven appearances before the 2020–21 season was curtailed early due to the ongoing pandemic. He signed on for the 2021–22 season and played 19 games, though was not in a matchday squad after December. He joined Guadeloupe side Sporting Club Baie-Mahault of the Guadeloupe Division of Honour in October 2022.

== International career ==
Zubar made his international debut for Guadeloupe at the 2011 CONCACAF Gold Cup. He played in the 1–0 defeats to Canada and eventual runners-up the United States.

== Style of play ==
Zubar was a pacey and strong defender, able to play at centre-back and right-back. Speaking in February 2012, Bournemouth manager Lee Bradbury stated that Zubar "works very hard, is really passionate about the game and is a deep thinker".

== Personal life ==
He is the younger brother of Ronald Zubar and cousin of Claude Dielna, both of whom are footballers.

== Career statistics ==
=== Club ===
Appearances and goals by club, season and competition
Season	Club	League			National cup (Note: Includes Coupe de France, Belgian Cup, FA Cup)		League cup (Note: Includes Football League Cup)		Other		Total	
Season	Club	Division	Apps	Goals	Apps	Goals	Apps	Goals	Apps	Goals	Apps	Goals
Caen B	2005–06	Championnat de France Amateur 2			—		—		—			
Caen B	2006–07	Championnat de France Amateur 2			—		—		—			
Caen B	2007–08	Championnat de France Amateur	9	1	—		—		—		9	1
Caen B	2008–09	Championnat de France Amateur	9	0	—		—		—		9	0
Caen B	Total		18	1	—		—		—		18	1
Caen	2007–08	Ligue 1	0	0	0	0	1	0	—		1	0
Pau (loan)	2006–07	Championnat National	10	0					—		10	0
Brussels (loan)	2007–08	Belgian First Division	11	0	—		—		—		11	0
Vaslui	2008–09	Liga I	9	0	0	0	—		—		9	0
Vaslui	2009–10	Liga I	26	1	1	0	—		4 (Note: Appearances in UEFA Europa League)	0	31	1
Vaslui	Total		35	1	1	0	—		4	0	40	1
Plymouth Argyle	2010–11	League One	29	2	—		—		—		29	2
Plymouth Argyle	2011–12	League Two	4	0	—		1	0	—		5	0
Plymouth Argyle	Total		33	2	—		1	0	—		34	2
AFC Bournemouth	2011–12	League One	22	0	1	1	—		2 (Note: Appearance(s) in Football League Trophy)	0	25	1
AFC Bournemouth	2012–13	League One	2	0	0	0	1	0	0	0	3	0
AFC Bournemouth	2013–14	Championship	0	0	0	0	0	0	—		0	0
AFC Bournemouth	2014–15	Championship	0	0	—		0	0	—		0	0
AFC Bournemouth	2015–16	Premier League	0	0	0	0	0	0	—		0	0
AFC Bournemouth	Total		24	0	1	1	1	0	2	0	28	1
Bury (loan)	2012–13	League One	6	0	—		—		—		6	0
Port Vale (loan)	2014–15	League One	2	0	—		—		1	0	3	0
York City (loan)	2014–15	League Two	23	2	2	0	—		—		25	2
York City (loan)	2015–16	League Two	4	0	—		1	0	—		5	0
York City (loan)	Total		27	2	2	0	1	0	—		30	2
Weymouth	2016–17	Southern League Premier Division	36	4	4	0	—		6 (Note: Five appearances in FA Trophy, one appearance and one goal in Dorset Senior Cup)	1	46	5
Yeovil Town	2017–18	League Two	0	0	0	0	0	0	0	0	0	0
Weymouth	2017–18	Southern League Premier Division	27	1	0	0	—		1 (Note: Appearance in play-offs.)	0	28	1
Weymouth	2018–19	Southern League Premier Division South	36	5	2	1	—		7	1	45	7
Weymouth	2019–20	National League South	20	1	1	0	—		2 (Note: One appearance in FA Trophy and one appearance in the play-offs)	0	23	1
Weymouth	Total		83	7	3	1	0	0	10	1	96	9
Gosport Borough	2020–21	Southern League Premier Division South	1	0	0	0	—		0	0	1	0
A.F.C. Totton	2020–21	Southern League Division One South	6	0	0	0	—		1 (Note: One appearance in FA Trophy)	0	7	0
A.F.C. Totton	2021–22	Southern League Division One South	13	1	0	0	—		6 (Note: Three appearances in FA Trophy, three appearances in Southern League Cup, one appearance in Hampshire Senior Cup)	0	19	1
A.F.C. Totton	2022–23	Southern League Division One South	0	0	0	0	—		0	0	0	0
A.F.C. Totton	Total		19	1	0	0	0	0	7	0	26	1
Career total			305	18	11	2	4	0	30	2	350	22

=== International ===
Appearances and goals by national team and year
National team	Year	Apps	Goals
Guadeloupe	2011	2	0
Total		2	0

== Honours ==
Weymouth

- Southern Football League Premier Division South: 2018–19
- National League South play-offs: 2020
