= FC Internațional Curtea de Argeș =

Internațional
- Full name: Fotbal Club Internaţional Curtea de Argeș
- Short name: Inter
- Founded: 2000
- Dissolved: 2011
- Ground: Stadionul Municipal
- Website: www.fcinternational.ro
Home colours	Away colours

Internaţional Curtea de Argeș was a Romanian professional football club from Curtea de Argeș, Argeș County, founded in 2000 and dissolved in 2011. During its short existence, the club reached the highest stage in Romanian football, Liga I, playing for a season in this first tier.

== History ==
The club was founded in 2000 by local businessman Ion Lazăr, after purchasing the Divizia C place of Juventus Bascov, a team that had just been promoted from the Argeș County Championship. The newly established club was named Internațional Pitești. In its first season of existence, Inter won Series V of the third division and secured promotion to Divizia B.

In its second season of existence, Inter finished 5th in Series II of the 2001–02 Divizia B. Three more seasons in the second tier followed, with finishes of 11th in Series I in 2002–03, 8th in Series II in 2003–04, and 13th in 2004–05, after which the club sold its right to play in Divizia B to Astra Ploiești.

After a two-year hiatus, Internațional was re-founded in 2007 by Ion Lazăr, this time with its headquarters in Curtea de Argeș. Following the acquisition of Voința Macea’s Liga III place, the club returned to the third division and finished first in Series IV of the 2007–08 Liga III Liga III season, earning promotion to Liga II.

On 6 June 2009, the club succeeds to promote to the Liga I and obtains the greatest performance ever made by a club from Curtea de Argeș, becoming the third team from Argeș County that will play in the Liga I after FC Argeș Pitești and Dacia Mioveni.

Inter finished 12th its first Liga I season in history, but during the summer it announced that is forfeiting next season because Ion Lazăr, the owner of the club, could not afford to keep losing money in the football industry. Pandurii Târgu Jiu, the club that finished 15th last season, will take its place in the Liga I.

Internațional played in the Liga IV in the 2010–11 season, but was dissolved at the end of the season.

Period	Name
2000–2005	Internațional Pitești
2007–2011	Internațional Curtea de Argeș

== Stadium ==
Internaţional played its Liga III home matches on the Municipal Stadium in Curtea de Argeș. In the Liga II it played on the Ştrand Stadium in Piteşti and in the Liga I it played on the Dacia Stadium in Mioveni and on the Nicolae Dobrin Stadium in Piteşti.

== Honours ==
Liga II

- Runners-up (1): 2008–09

Liga III

- Winners (2): 2000–01, 2007–08

== Former managers ==
- (Romania) Stelian Badea (2001–2004)
- (Romania) Octavian Grigore (2004–2005)
- (Romania) Ștefan Stoica (2009)
- (Romania) Ionuț Badea (2009–2010)
