= Robert Săceanu =

Romanian footballer

Personal information
- Full name: Robert Elian Săceanu
- Date of birth: 22 June 1983 (age 43)
- Place of birth: Corabia, Romania
- Height: 1.81 m (5 ft 11 in)
- Position: Midfielder

Senior career*
Years	Team	Apps	(Gls)
2000–2004	Extensiv Craiova	55	(1)
2004–2005	FC Caracal	28	(2)
2005–2009	Universitatea Craiova	77	(8)
2008	→ Gloria Buzău (loan)	4	(0)
2009	→ CSM Râmnicu Vâlcea (loan)	16	(1)
2009–2011	Gloria Bistrița	25	(1)
2011	FC Snagov	5	(0)
2012	ALRO Slatina	8	(0)
2012–2013	Farul Constanța	20	(2)
2013–2014	FC U Craiova	18	(3)
2014–2016	CS Podari		
2017	AS Stejari		
Total		256	(18)

Managerial career
- 2017–2024: FC U Craiova (sporting director)
- 2024–2025: FC U Craiova (delegate)
- * Club domestic league appearances and goals

Robert Elian Săceanu (born 22 June 1983) is a former Romanian professional footballer who played as a midfielder.

== Honours ==
Universitatea Craiova

- Divizia B: 2005–06
