= Stadionul Municipal (Curtea de Argeș) =

Multi-use stadium in Romania

Municipal Stadium
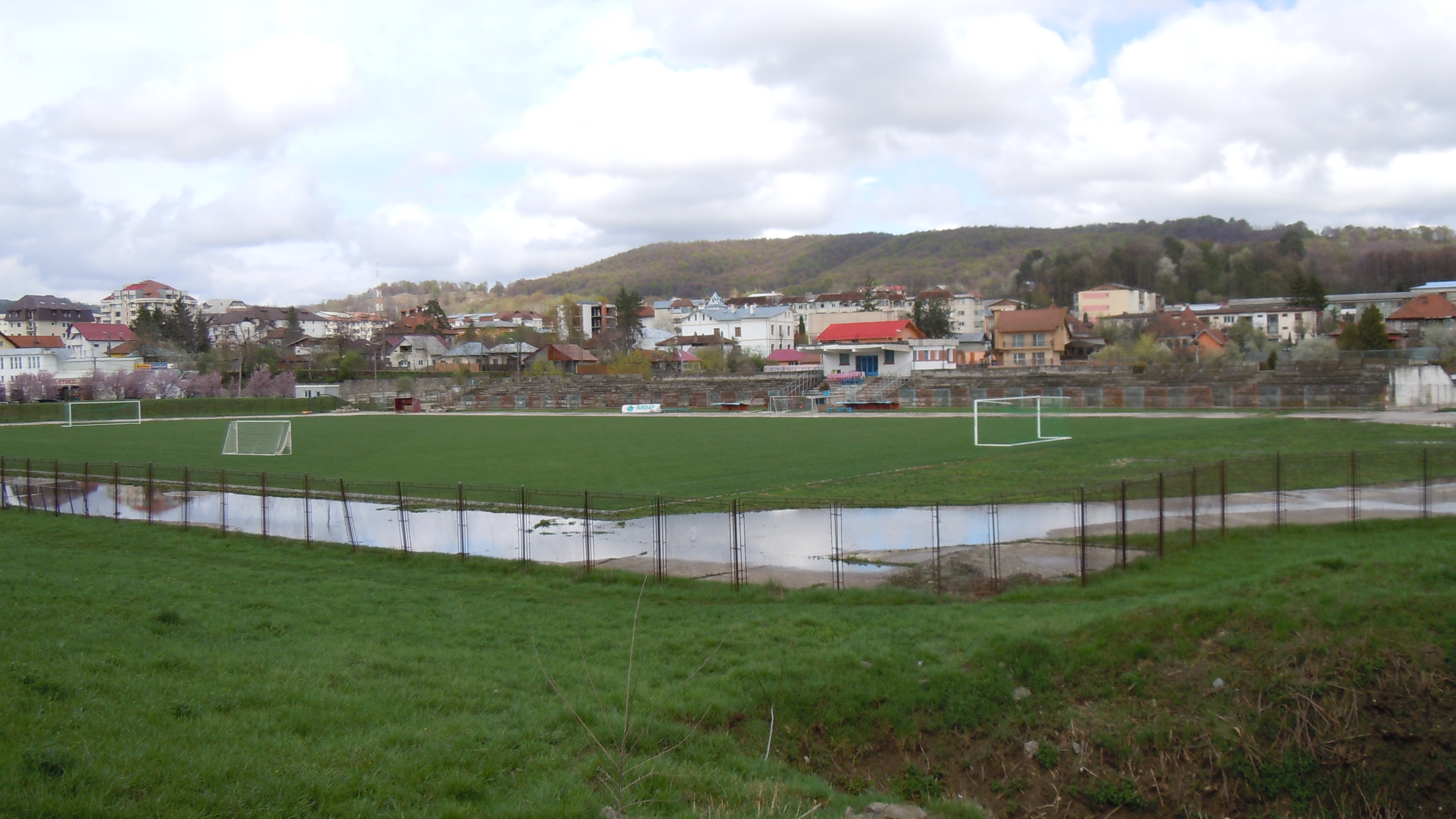
- Curtea de Arges stadium
- Interactive map of Municipal Stadium
- Location: Curtea de Argeș, Romania
- Coordinates: 45.1471°N 24.6732°E
- Capacity: 7,500

Tenant
- Internaţional Curtea de Argeş

Municipal Stadium is a multi-use stadium in Curtea de Argeș, Romania. It serves mostly for football matches and had been the home ground of Internaţional Curtea de Argeş. The stadium holds up to 7,500 people.

- Recently, the field grass has been replaced.
