= Gerlem Willian =

Brazilian footballer (born 1984)

Personal information
- Full name: Gerlem Willian de Jesus Almeida
- Date of birth: August 7, 1984 (age 42)
- Place of birth: Linhares, Brazil
- Height: 1.78 m (5 ft 10 in)
- Positions: Winger; attacking midfielder

Senior career*
Years	Team	Apps	(Gls)
2003–2005	Bahia	3	(0)
2005–2006	Estoril	31	(10)
2007–2009	Farul Constanța	49	(7)
2009–2012	Vaslui	34	(5)
2012	Vitória	1	(0)
2012	Macaé	3	(0)
2013	Linhares	0	(0)
2013–2014	Syrianska	17	(1)
2014	→ AFC United (loan)	6	(0)
2015	Colo Colo	3	(0)
2015	Rio Branco-ES	7	(4)
2016	Operário-MT	0	(0)
2016	Espírito Santo	5	(0)
2017	Linhares		
2017	Rio Branco-VN		
2018	São Mateus-ES		
2018	Araguaína		
2018	Castelo		
Total		159	(27)
- * Club domestic league appearances and goals as of 11 March 2024

Gerlem Willian de Jesus Almeida (born August 7, 1984), known as just Gerlem Willian, is a Brazilian professional footballer.

== Career ==
=== Early career ===
Gerlem was born on 7 August 1984 in Linhares, Espírito Santo, Brazil. On 15 June 2003, he made his Série A debut, appearing for Bahia when coach Evaristo sent him at half-time in a 2–1 home win over Vitória.

In 2005 he went to play in the Portuguese second league for Estoril where in his first season he scored seven goals in 20 matches, demonstrating an appetite for scoring. In the middle of the following season, Gerlem had to leave the team after having a conflict with the coach.

=== Farul Constanța ===
In 2007, Farul Constanța paid €100,000 to Estoril to transfer Gerlem. He made his Liga I debut on 14 April 2007 when coach Basarab Panduru sent him in the 68th minute to replace Cosmin Băcilă in a 2–1 home loss to Rapid București. He scored his first goal in the league on 13 May, as he sealed a 2–0 win over Politehnica Iași. In the following season on 21 September 2007, Gerlem received a red card in a game against Pandurii Târgu Jiu because of an altercation with Constant Djakpa, after which he got in a verbal conflict with one of the assistant referees, for which he received an eight-match ban. After the ban, he scored three goals in three victories against Universitatea Craiova, Vaslui and Dacia Mioveni until the end of the season. In the first half of the 2008–09 season he scored a goal in a loss to "U" Craiova, the only goal in a win over Vaslui with a spectacular shot from outside the penalty box, and was named Farul's footballer of the year in 2008. In the second half of the season, Gerlem scored one goal in a 2–0 win over Gaz Metan Mediaș, but his side was relegated.

=== Vaslui ===
Following Farul's relegation, Gerlem moved to Vaslui for a transfer fee of €700,000. In his first season, he scored once in each of the three victories against Astra Ploiești, Unirea Urziceni and Pandurii, also netting once in a loss to Steaua București. In the same season he helped The Yellow-Greens eliminate Omonia Nicosia in the third qualifying round of the Europa League, being eliminated by AEK Athens in the play-off. In the next two seasons he played rarely, scoring only one goal in August 2011 in a 2–1 away win over FC Brașov. He also helped the team under coach Viorel Hizo to eliminate Sparta Prague and reach the 2011–12 Europa League group stage where he played only one game, a 2–0 away loss to FC Zürich. Gerlem made his last Liga I appearance on 4 December 2011, playing for Vaslui in a 1–0 home win against Oțelul Galați, having a total of 83 matches with 12 goals in the competition and six games in the Europa League.

=== Late career ===
In 2012, Gerlem returned to Brazil, playing in the lower leagues. He had a brief return to Europe when he joined Swedish top-league club Syrianska in 2013. His debut took place on 1 September 2013, as coach Özcan Melkemichel sent him in the 73rd minute to replace Anders Bååth in a 6–1 away loss to IFK Norrköping. The team was relegated at the end of the season, with him making only seven appearances, but he continued to play for them in the second league. After playing in 2014 for AFC United in the Swedish third league, Gerlem returned to play in the Brazilian lower leagues until the end of his career.

== Statistics ==
Appearances and goals by club, season and competition
Club	Season	League		Cup		Continental		Total	
Club	Season	Apps	Goals	Apps	Goals	Apps	Goals	Apps	Goals
Bahia	2003	3	0	0	0	—		3	0
Estoril	2005–06	20	7	0	0	—		20	7
Estoril	2006–07	11	3	0	0	—		11	3
Farul Constanța	2006–07	7	1	0	0	—		7	1
Farul Constanța	2007–08	22	3	0	0	—		22	3
Farul Constanța	2008–09	20	3	1	0	—		21	3
Vaslui	2009–10	24	4	1	0	4 (Note: Appearances in the UEFA Europa League)	0	29	4
Vaslui	2010–11	5	0	0	0	0	0	5	0
Vaslui	2011–12	5	1	0	0	2	0	7	1
Vitória	2012	1	0	0	0	—		1	0
Macaé	2012	3	0	0	0	—		3	0
Syrianska	2013	7	0	0	0	—		7	0
Syrianska	2014	10	1	2	1	—		12	2
AFC United	2014	6	0	1	0	—		7	0
Colo Colo	2015	3	1	0	0	—		3	1
Rio Branco-ES	2015	7	4	0	0	—		7	4
Operário-MT	2016	0	0	2	0	—		2	0
Espírito Santo	2016	5	0	0	0	—		5	0
Career total		159	27	7	1	6	0	172	28
