= CS Brazi =

Romanian multi-sport club

- Full name: Clubul Sportiv Brazi
- Founded: 2002; 23 years ago
- Based in: Brazi, Romania
- Website: Club website

Clubul Sportiv Brazi is a Romanian multi-sport club based in Brazi, Prahova County.

== Men's Football section ==
CS Brazi men's football section competes in Liga IV – Prahova County, the fourth tier of Romanian football.

=== Honours ===
Liga V – Prahova County

- Runners-up (1): 2018–19

== Women's Football section ==
CS Brazi women's football section was established in 2010 and competed in the Romanian women's top football league five consecutive seasons between 2010 and 2015. The team was dissolved in 2015.
