= Dinu Sănmărtean =

Romanian footballer

Personal information
- Full name: Dinu Daniel Sănmărtean
- Date of birth: 28 July 1981 (age 45)
- Place of birth: Bistriţa, Romania
- Height: 1.74 m (5 ft 8 1/2 in)
- Position: Defender

Senior career*
Years	Team	Apps	(Gls)
2001–2010	Gloria Bistriţa	44	(0)
2001–2002	→ Poli Unirea Iaşi (loan)	15	(3)
2003–2004	→ Vaslui (loan)	23	(0)
2006	→ Thrasyvoulos F.C. (loan)	0	(0)
2007	→ FC Săcele (loan)	14	(0)
2008	→ Prefab Modelu (loan)	7	(0)
2009	→ Bihor Oradea (loan)	15	(1)
2010	Vaslui	4	(0)
2010	Mureşul Deva	10	(1)
2011–2012	Delta Tulcea	15	(0)
2012–2013	CF Brăila	15	(0)
2013–2014	Gloria Bistriţa	13	(0)
2014–2015	SC 04 Tuttlingen		
2017	FC Bolintin Vale		
- * Club domestic league appearances and goals as of 8 April 2015

Dinu Sănmărtean (born 28 July 1981) is a former Romanian footballer. His previous club was Gloria Bistrița. His older brother, Lucian, was the Romanian Footballer of the Year in 2014.

== Honours ==
FC Vaslui

- Cupa României Runner-up: 2010
