= Constantin Gângioveanu =

Romanian footballer

Personal information
- Full name: Constantin Mihai Gângioveanu
- Date of birth: 4 September 1989 (age 37)
- Place of birth: Craiova, Romania
- Height: 1.72 m (5 ft 8 in)
- Position: Midfielder

Youth career
- Universitatea Craiova

Senior career*
Years	Team	Apps	(Gls)
2005–2011	Universitatea Craiova	82	(3)
2009–2010	→ Vaslui (loan)	2	(0)
2011	Rapid București	0	(0)
2012	Cherno More Varna	0	(0)
2016	F.A. Euro New York		
Total		84	(3)

International career^{‡}
2008–2010	Romania U21	14	(7)
- * Club domestic league appearances and goals as of 10 July 2020 ‡ National team caps and goals as of 11 August 2010

Constantin Gangioveanu (born 4 September 1989) is a Romanian former football midfielder. He ended his career at the age of 27, however in 2016 he played in the United States for F.A. Euro New York. Afterwards he moved to Los Angeles where he worked various jobs, including as a fitness instructor.

== Honours ==
Universitatea Craiova

- Liga II: 2005–06
