= Brazi =

- Commune
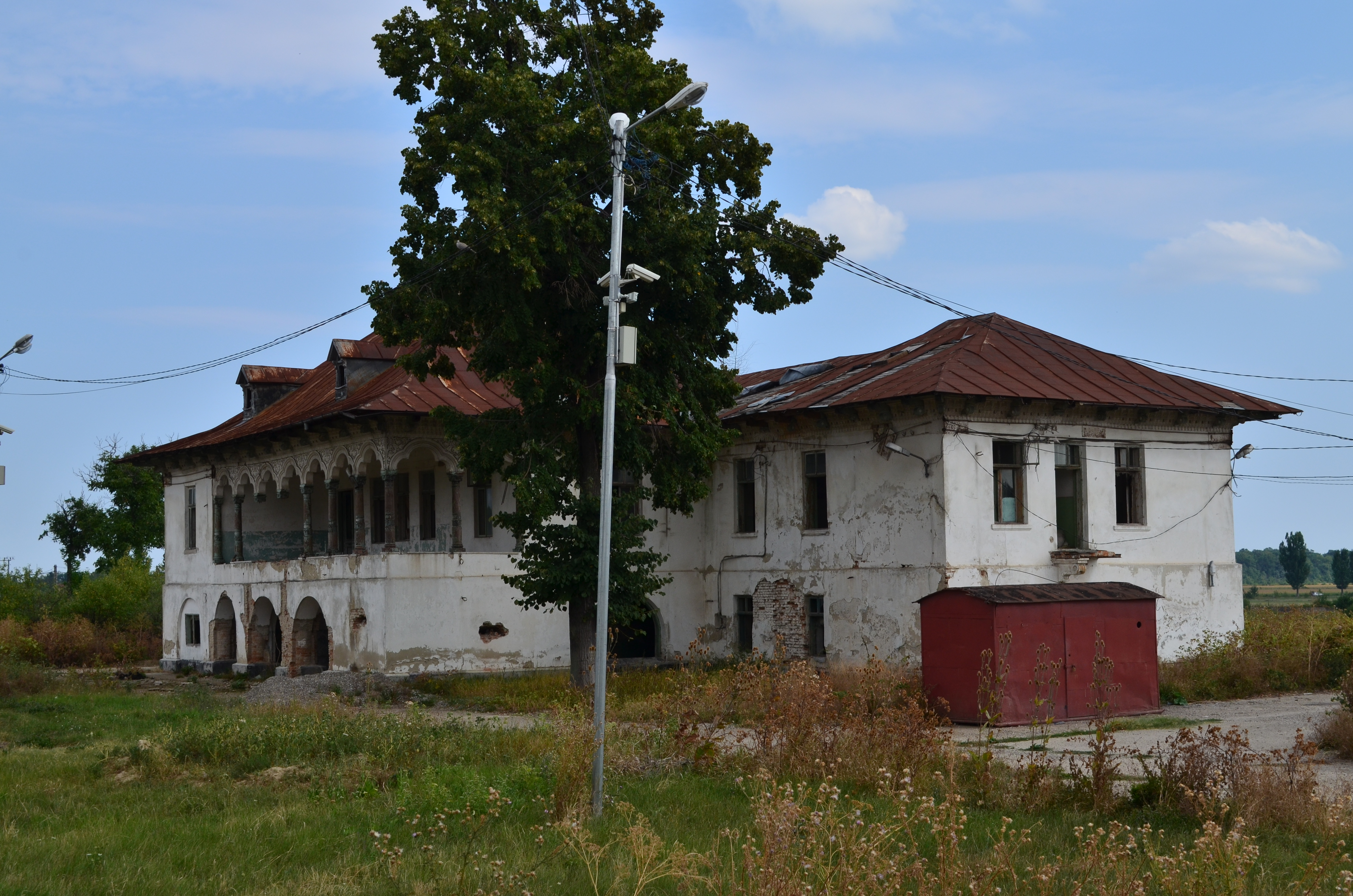
- The Nicolau mansion (Conacul Nicolau) from Brazii de Sus

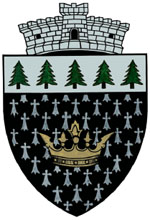
- Coat of arms

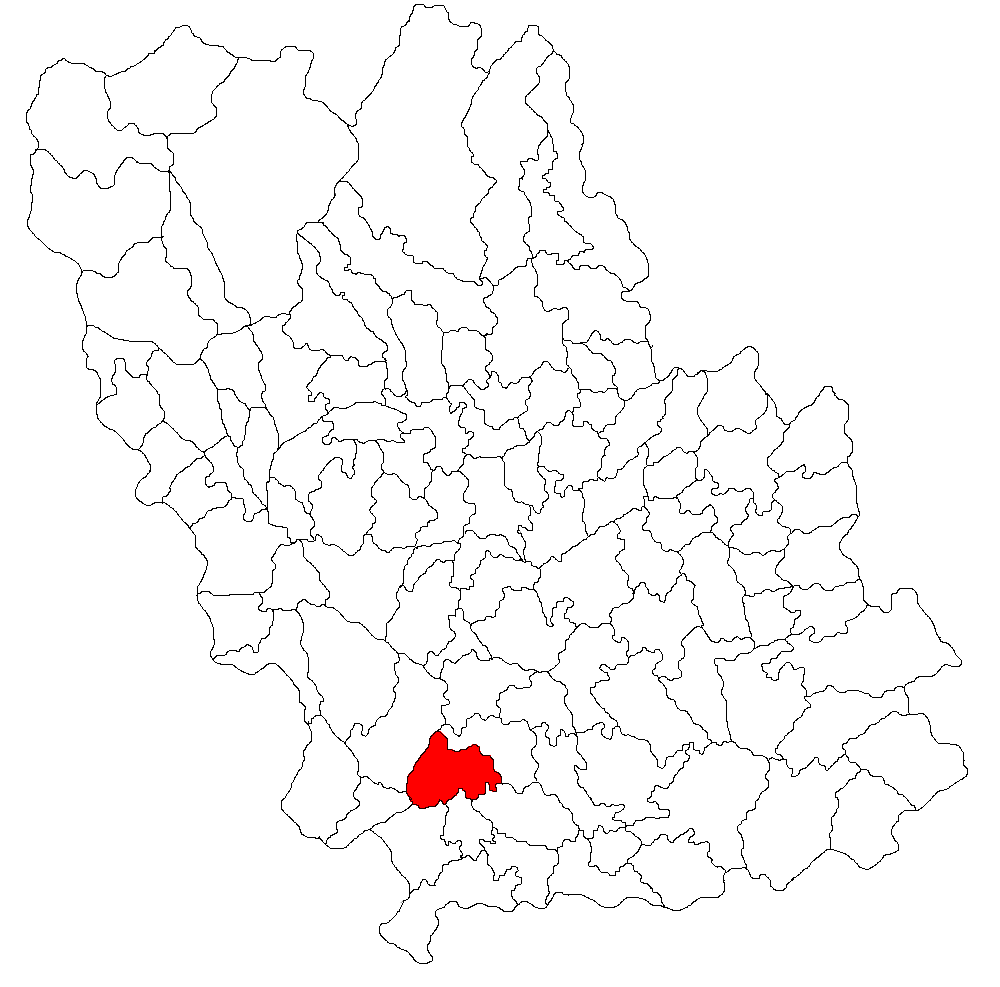
- Location in Prahova County

- Location in Romania
- Coordinates: 44°53′N 26°0′E
- Country: Romania
- County: Prahova

Government
  - Mayor (2020–2024): Leonaș Radu (PNL)
- Area: 45.42 km^{2} (17.54 sq mi)
- Elevation: 131 m (430 ft)
- Population (2021-12-01): 7,811
  - Density: 172.0/km^{2} (445.4/sq mi)
- Time zone: UTC+02:00 (EET)
  - Summer (DST): UTC+03:00 (EEST)
- Postal code: 107090
- Area code: +(40) 244
- Vehicle reg.: PH
- Website: pcbrazi.ro

Brazi is a commune in Prahova County, Muntenia, Romania. It is composed of six villages: Bătești, Brazii de Jos, Brazii de Sus (the commune centre), Negoiești, Popești, and Stejaru.

Its name translates to "firs" as in the tree.

Historical population
Year	Pop.	±%
1948	1,530	—
1992	8,316	+443.5%
2002	8,549	+2.8%
2011	8,094	−5.3%
2021	7,811	−3.5%
Source: Census data

In 1948, the commune had a population of 1,530. By the 2011 census, the population of Brazi had increased to 8,094, of which 97.63% were Romanians. At the 2021 census, there were 7,811 inhabitants; of those, 92.7% were Romanians.

The Petrobrazi Refinery (one of the largest Romanian oil refineries and one of the largest in Eastern Europe) is located in Brazi.

The headquarters of the 635th Anti-aircraft Defense Battalion "Precista" of the 1st Maneuver Support Brigade "Argedava" is located in Negoiești village.

The commune is the home of the CS Brazi and CS Brazi (women) sport clubs; Stadionul Chimia is the home grounds for their football teams.

== Natives ==
- Alexandru Tudor-Miu (1901–1961), poet
