= 2006–07 FC Steaua București season =

Steaua București
2006–07 season
- Owner: George Becali
- President: Mihai Stoica
- Head coach: Cosmin Olăroiu
- Stadium: Stadionul Steaua; Stadionul Național
- Liga I: 2nd
- Cupa României: Semi-finals
- Supercupa României: Winners
- Champions League: Group stage
- UEFA Cup: Round of 16
- Top goalscorer: League: Valentin Badea (13); All: Valentin Badea (17)
Home colours	Away colours

The 2006–07 season was the 59th season in the existence of FC Steaua București and the club's 59th consecutive season in the top flight of Romanian football. In addition to the domestic league, Steaua București participated in this season's edition of the Cupa României, the Supercupa României, the UEFA Champions League and the UEFA Cup.

== Players ==
=== First-team squad ===
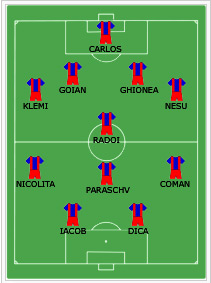
The first eleven in the 2006–07 season

Squad at end of season

Note: Flags indicate national team as defined under FIFA eligibility rules; some limited exceptions apply. Players may hold more than one non-FIFA nationality.

No.	Pos.	Nation	Player
12	GK	ROU	Cornel Cernea
13	GK	POR	Carlos Fernandes
31	GK	ROU	Marius Toma
3	DF	ROU	Dorin Goian
4	DF	ROU	Bogdan Panait
6	DF	ROU	Mirel Rădoi (captain)
15	DF	ROU	Mihai Neșu
17	DF	ROU	Eugen Baciu
18	DF	ROU	Petre Marin
23	DF	ISR	Klemi Saban
24	DF	ROU	Sorin Ghionea
27	DF	ROU	Stelian Stancu
8	MF	ROU	Ovidiu Petre

No.	Pos.	Nation	Player
10	MF	ROU	Nicolae Dică (vice-captain)
11	MF	ROU	Gabriel Boștină
14	MF	ROU	Vasilică Cristocea
16	MF	ROU	Bănel Nicoliță
20	MF	ROU	Florin Lovin
22	MF	ROU	Sorin Paraschiv (vice-captain)
28	MF	ROU	Gigel Coman
30	MF	ROU	Răzvan Ochiroșii
32	MF	ROU	Apostol Muzac
7	FW	ROU	Daniel Oprița
9	FW	ROU	Valentin Badea
19	FW	ROU	Victoraș Iacob
21	FW	FRA	Cyril Théréau

=== Transfers ===
==== In ====
Total spending: €4,35M
Player	From	Fee
(Romania) Valentin Badea	(Romania) FC Vaslui	€1.1M (together with Panait)
(Romania) Bogdan Panait	(Romania) FC Vaslui	€1.1M (together with Badea)
(Israel) Klemi Saban	(Israel) Maccabi Haifa	€0.25M
(Romania) Gigel Coman	(Romania) FC Timișoara	€0.7M
(France) Cyril Théréau	(Belgium) Charleroi	€0.6M
(Romania) Ovidiu Petre	(Romania) FC Timișoara	€1M
(Romania) Stelian Stancu	(Romania) Sportul Studențesc	€0.7M

==== Out ====
Total income: €3,8M
Player	New team	Fee
(Romania) George Ogăraru	(Netherlands) Ajax	€3.3M
(Romania) Andrei Cristea	(Romania) FC Timișoara	€0.5M
(Romania) Andrei Enescu	(Romania) Pandurii Târgu Jiu	Free

==== Loan out ====
Player	Team
(Romania) Valentin Simion	(Romania) UTA Arad
(Romania) Adrian Drida	(Romania) Jiul Petroșani
(Romania) Alin Lițu	(Romania) Jiul Petroșani
(Romania) Alexandru Tudose	(Romania) UTA Arad
(Romania) Daniel Bălan	(Cyprus) Omonia Nicosia

== Competitions ==
=== Overall record ===
Competition	First match	Last match	Starting round	Final position	Record							
Competition	First match	Last match	Starting round	Final position	Pld	W	D	L	GF	GA	GD	Win %
Liga I	29 July 2006	23 May 2007	Matchday 1	2nd	34	21	8	5	61	22	+39	61.76
Cupa României	25 October 2006	18 April 2007	Round of 32	Semi-finals	4	2	1	1	8	5	+3	50.00
Supercupa României	22 July 2006		Final	Winners	1	1	0	0	1	0	+1	100.00
UEFA Champions League	26 July 2006	6 December 2006	Second qualifying round	Group stage	10	4	3	3	16	14	+2	40.00
UEFA Cup	15 February 2007	22 February 2007	Round of 32	Round of 32	2	0	0	2	0	3	−3	0.00
Total					51	28	12	11	86	44	+42	54.90

Source: Competitions

=== Supercupa României ===
==== Results ====
22 July 2006 Final	Steaua București	1–0	Rapid București	Bucharest
21:00 EEST (UTC+3)	Opriţa 90'	Report		Stadium: Național; Attendance: 12,000; Referee: Alexandru Tudor

=== Liga I ===
==== League table ====
Pos	Team	Pld	W	D	L	GF	GA	GD	Pts	Qualification or relegation
1	Dinamo București (C)	34	23	8	3	63	24	+39	77	Qualification to Champions League third qualifying round
2	Steaua București	34	21	8	5	61	22	+39	71	Qualification to Champions League second qualifying round
3	CFR Cluj	34	21	6	7	59	32	+27	69	Qualification to UEFA Cup second qualifying round
4	Rapid București	34	16	11	7	63	39	+24	59	Qualification to UEFA Cup first round
5	Oțelul Galați	34	17	5	12	60	56	+4	56	Qualification to Intertoto Cup second round

Source: LT (in Romanian)
Rules for classification: 1) points; 2) head-to-head points; 3) head-to-head goal difference; 4) head-to-head goals scored; 5) goal difference; 6) number of goals scored.
(C) Champions

==== Results summary ====
Overall								Home						Away					
Pld	W	D	L	GF	GA	GD	Pts	W	D	L	GF	GA	GD	W	D	L	GF	GA	GD
34	21	8	5	61	22	+39	71	14	2	1	42	10	+32	7	6	4	19	12	+7

Source: LT

==== Results by round ====
Round	1	2	3	4	5	6	7	8	9	10	11	12	13	14	15	16	17	18	19	20	21	22	23	24	25	26	27	28	29	30	31	32	33	34
Ground	A	H	A	H	H	A	H	A	H	A	H	A	H	A	H	A	H	H	A	HR	A	A	HR	A	H	A	H	A	H	A	H	A	H	A
Result	D	W	W	W	W	W	D	L	W	D	W	L	W	D	W	D	W	W	D	D	L	D	W	W	L	L	W	W	W	W	W	W	W	W
Position	11	5	3	3	3	2	2	3	2	2	2	2	2	2	2	2	2	2	2	2	2	3	3	3	3	4	3	3	3	3	2	2	2	2

Source: Matches
A = Away; H = Home; W = Win; D = Draw; L = Loss

==== Matches ====
29 July 2006 1	Politehnica Timișoara	0–0	Steaua București	Timișoara
21:00 EEST (UTC+3)		Report		Stadium: Dan Păltinișanu; Attendance: 32,000; Referee: Sorin Corpodean

5 August 2006 2	Steaua București	3–0	Universitatea Craiova	Bucharest
21:00 EEST (UTC+3)	Paraschiv 32'; Oprița 40'; Dică 55' (pen.)	Report		Stadium: Național; Attendance: 15,000; Referee: Robert Dumitru

13 August 2006 3	UTA Arad	0–3	Steaua București	Arad
17:00 EEST (UTC+3)		Report	Cristocea 19'; Dică 33', 66'	Stadium: Francisc von Neuman; Attendance: 6,500; Referee: Augustus Constantin

19 August 2006 4	Steaua București	3–1	Vaslui	Bucharest
20:00 EEST (UTC+3)	Badea 45'; Dică 50' (pen.), 67' (pen.)	Report	Gheorghiu 22'	Stadium: Național; Attendance: 5,000; Referee: Lucian Dan

26 August 2006 5	Steaua București	3–0	Farul Constanța	Bucharest
21:00 EEST (UTC+3)	Nicoliță 24'; Oprița 38', 54'	Report		Stadium: Național; Attendance: 5,000; Referee: Tiberiu Lajos

9 September 2006 6	Argeș Pitești	0–1	Steaua București	Pitești
17:00 EEST (UTC+3)		Report	Dică 85'	Stadium: Nicolae Dobrin; Attendance: 12,000; Referee: Cristian Balaj

17 September 2006 7	Steaua București	1–1	Rapid București	Bucharest
20:30 EEST (UTC+3)	Oprița 84'	Report	Grigore 20'	Stadium: Național; Attendance: 30,000; Referee: Marian Salomir

20 September 2006 8	Dinamo București	1–0	Steaua București	Bucharest
20:30 EEST (UTC+3)	Șerban 90+1'	Report		Stadium: Dinamo; Attendance: 15,000; Referee: Sorin Corpodean

23 September 2006 9	Steaua București	2–1	Gloria Bistrița	Bucharest
21:00 EEST (UTC+3)	Boștină 41' (pen.); Oprița 79'	Report	Costea 11'	Stadium: Național; Attendance: 1,000; Referee: Orlando Trandu

1 October 2006 10	Politehnica Iași	1–1	Steaua București	Iași
17:00 EEST (UTC+3)	Mitrović 90+2'	Report	Dică 77' (pen.)	Stadium: Emil Alexandrescu; Attendance: 10,000; Referee: Tiberiu Lajos

13 October 2006 11	Steaua București	4–2	CFR Cluj	Bucharest
20:00 EEST (UTC+3)	Ghionea 6'; Dică 43', 73' (pen.); Théréau 44'	Report	Dan 64', 83'	Stadium: Steaua; Attendance: 0 Referee: Sebastian Colțescu

22 October 2006 12	Oțelul Galați	2–1	Steaua București	Galați
15:00 EEST (UTC+3)	Baciu 53'; Jula 81'	Report	Théréau 58'	Stadium: Oțelul; Attendance: 7,000; Referee: Augustus Constantin

28 October 2006 13	Steaua București	3–0	Unirea Urziceni	Bucharest
20:45 EEST (UTC+3)	Badea 57'; Nicoliță 61'; Dică 71'	Report		Stadium: Steaua; Attendance: 10,000; Referee: Ștefan Erdei

5 November 2006 14	Ceahlăul Piatra Neamț	0–0	Steaua București	Piatra Neamț
21:30 EET (UTC+2)		Report		Stadium: Ceahlăul; Attendance: 9,000; Referee: Vasile Bratu

12 November 2006 15	Steaua București	6–0	Național București	Bucharest
21:30 EET (UTC+2)	Cristocea 28'; Théréau 31', 41', 45'; Rădoi 82' (pen.); Stancu 90+3'	Report		Stadium: Steaua; Attendance: 10,000; Referee: Marius Martiș

18 November 2006 16	Pandurii Târgu Jiu	0–0	Steaua București	Târgu Jiu
15:00 EET (UTC+2)		Report		Stadium: Tudor Vladimirescu; Attendance: 10,000; Referee: Cristian Balaj

26 November 2006 17	Steaua București	3–0	Jiul Petroșani	Bucharest
21:30 EET (UTC+2)	Badea 24'; Théréau 62', 88'	Report		Stadium: Steaua; Attendance: 10,000; Referee: Adrian Comănescu

2 December 2006 18	Steaua București	3–1	Politehnica Timișoara	Bucharest
18:00 EET (UTC+2)	Théréau 27'; Petre 45'; Badea 90+3'	Report	Bucur 83'	Stadium: Steaua; Attendance: 22,000; Referee: Sebastian Colțescu

10 December 2006 19	Universitatea Craiova	0–0	Steaua București	Craiova
21:30 EET (UTC+2)		Report		Stadium: Ion Oblemenco; Attendance: 15,000; Referee: Augustus Constantin

25 February 2007 20	Steaua București	0–0	UTA Arad	Oradea
15:00 EET (UTC+2)		Report		Stadium: Iuliu Bodola; Attendance: 11,000; Referee: Lucian Dan

4 March 2007 21	Vaslui	1–0	Steaua București	Vaslui
16:30 EET (UTC+2)	Neagu 79'	Report		Stadium: Municipal; Attendance: 9,500; Referee: Sebastian Colțescu

10 March 2007 22	Farul Constanța	1–1	Steaua București	Constanța
21:45 EET (UTC+2)	Tilincă 53'	Report	Badea 49'	Stadium: Farul; Attendance: 13,000; Referee: Augustus Constantin

17 March 2007 23	Steaua București	2–0	Argeș Pitești	Craiova
21:45 EET (UTC+2)	Badea 49'; Élton 52'	Report		Stadium: Ion Oblemenco; Attendance: 3,500; Referee: Robert Dumitru

1 April 2007 24	Rapid București	2–3	Steaua București	Bucharest
20:00 EEST (UTC+3)	Ganea 40'; Zicu 66'	Report	Théréau 21'; Badea 58'; Ochiroșii 84'	Stadium: Giulești-Valentin Stănescu; Attendance: 10,000; Referee: Ľuboš Micheľ (Slovakia)

7 April 2007 25	Steaua București	2–4	Dinamo București	Bucharest
19:00 EEST (UTC+3)	Badea 47'; Théréau 90+7'	Report	Munteanu 7'; Dănciulescu 22'; Niculescu 34', 50'	Stadium: Steaua; Attendance: 25,000; Referee: Vladimír Hriňák (Slovakia)

14 April 2007 26	Gloria Bistrița	2–0	Steaua București	Bistrița
15:30 EEST (UTC+3)	Zaharia 31'; Abrudan 81'	Report		Stadium: Gloria; Attendance: 10,000; Referee: Sebastian Colțescu

21 April 2007 27	Steaua București	1–0	Politehnica Iași	Bucharest
20:45 EEST (UTC+3)	Badea 10'	Report		Stadium: Steaua; Attendance: 0 Referee: Victor Berbecaru

26 April 2007 28	CFR Cluj	1–2	Steaua București	Cluj
15:30 EEST (UTC+3)	Goian 73' (o.g.)	Report	Iacob 31'; Goian 58'	Stadium: Dr. Constantin Rădulescu; Attendance: 10,000; Referee: Peter Sippel (Germany)

29 April 2007 29	Steaua București	3–0	Oțelul Galați	Bucharest
20:00 EEST (UTC+3)	Badea 41'; Iacob 51'; Ochiroșii 90+2'	Report		Stadium: Steaua; Attendance: 0 Referee: Cristian Balaj

5 May 2007 30	Unirea Urziceni	1–2	Steaua București	Urziceni
18:00 EEST (UTC+3)	Bilașco 84'	Report	Cristocea 20'; Badea 33' (pen.)	Stadium: Tineretului; Attendance: 10,000; Referee: Alexandru Tudor

9 May 2007 31	Steaua București	2–0	Ceahlăul Piatra Neamț	Bucharest
20:45 EEST (UTC+3)	Marin 60'; Iacob 66'	Report		Stadium: Steaua; Attendance: 20,000; Referee: Anton Heleșteanu

13 May 2007 32	Național București	0–3	Steaua București	Bucharest
20:30 EEST (UTC+3)		Report	Iacob 7', 65'; Cristocea 51'	Stadium: Cotroceni; Attendance: 6,000; Referee: Marius Martiș

19 May 2007 33	Steaua București	1–0	Pandurii Târgu Jiu	Bucharest
20:30 EEST (UTC+3)	Badea 45' (pen.)	Report		Stadium: Steaua; Attendance: 0 Referee: Teodor Crăciunescu

23 May 2007 34	Jiul Petroșani	0–2	Steaua București	Petroșani
17:00 EEST (UTC+3)		Report	Iacob 38'; Badea 52'	Stadium: Jiul; Attendance: 11,000; Referee: Sebastian Colțescu

=== Cupa României ===
==== Results ====
25 October 2006 Round of 32	Forex Brașov	0–3	Steaua București	Bucharest
20:45 EEST (UTC+3)		Report	Oprița 48'; Lovin 73'; Boștină 84'	Stadium: Steaua; Attendance: 5,000; Referee: Vasile Bratu

11 November 2006 Round of 16	Steaua București	2–1	Unirea Alba Iulia	Bucharest
20:45 EET (UTC+2)	Ghionea 31'; Cristocea 60'	Report	Mărincean 39'	Stadium: Steaua; Attendance: 10,000; Referee: Mugurel Drăgănescu

1 March 2007 Quarterfinals	Steaua București	3–3 (a.e.t.) (5–4 p)	Oțelul Galați	Constanța
20:45 EET (UTC+2)	Nicoliță 62'; Boștină 78' (pen.); Ov. Petre 108'	Report	Kim Gil-Sik 21'; Stan 90' (pen.); Boghiu 104'	Stadium: Farul; Attendance: 8,000; Referee: Mugurel Drăgănescu
	Penalties
	Boștină (penalty scored); Nicoliță (penalty scored); Coman (penalty scored); Badea (penalty scored); Théréau (penalty scored)		(penalty scored) Stan; (penalty scored) Paraschiv; (penalty missed) Gado; (penalty scored) Boghiu; (penalty scored) Székely

18 April 2007 Semifinals	Politehnica Timișoara	1–0	Steaua București	Bucharest
20:45 EEST (UTC+3)	McKain 45'	Report		Stadium: Giulești-Valentin Stănescu; Attendance: 4,000; Referee: Ferenc Bede (Hungary)

=== UEFA Champions League ===
==== Qualifying rounds ====
===== Second qualifying round =====
26 July 2006 First leg	Gorica (Slovenia)	0–2	(Romania) Steaua București	Nova Gorica, Slovenia
21:00 CEST (UTC+2)		Report	Dică 54'; Iacob 65'	Stadium: Športni Park; Attendance: 1,548; Referee: Stefan Messner (Austria)

2 August 2006 Second leg	Steaua București (Romania)	3–0 (5–0 agg.)	(Slovenia) Gorica	Bucharest, Romania
20:30 EEST (UTC+3)	Boștină 43'; Iacob 70'; Ochiroșii 87' (pen.)	Report		Stadium: Național; Attendance: 16,763; Referee: Pavel Královec (Czech Republic)

===== Third qualifying round =====
9 August 2006 First leg	Standard Liège (Belgium)	2–2	(Romania) Steaua București	Liège, Belgium
20:30 CEST (UTC+2)	Rapaić 17', 51'	Report	Paraschiv 8'; Marin 79'	Stadium: Maurice Dufrasne; Attendance: 15,613; Referee: Valentin Ivanov (Russia)

23 August 2006 Second leg	Steaua București (Romania)	2–1 (4–3 agg.)	(Belgium) Standard Liège	Bucharest, Romania
20:30 EEST (UTC+3)	Badea 35', 51'	Report	Jovanović 2'	Stadium: Național; Attendance: 44,234; Referee: Graham Poll (England)

==== Group stage ====
Group E standings
Pos	Team	Pld	W	D	L	GF	GA	GD	Pts	Qualification	LYO	RMA	STE	DKV
1	(France) Lyon	6	4	2	0	12	3	+9	14	Advance to knockout stage	—	2–0	1–1	1–0
2	(Spain) Real Madrid	6	3	2	1	14	8	+6	11	Advance to knockout stage	2–2	—	1–0	5–1
3	(Romania) Steaua București	6	1	2	3	7	11	−4	5	Transfer to UEFA Cup	0–3	1–4	—	1–1
4	(Ukraine) Dynamo Kyiv	6	0	2	4	5	16	−11	2		0–3	2–2	1–4	—

Source: RSSSF

===== Results =====
13 September 2006 1	Dynamo Kyiv (Ukraine)	1–4	(Romania) Steaua București	Kyiv, Ukraine
21:45 EEST (UTC+3)	Rebrov 16'	Report	Ghionea 3'; Badea 24'; Dică 43', 79'	Stadium: NSC Olimpiyskiy; Attendance: 55,000; Referee: Paul Allaerts (Belgium)

26 September 2006 2	Steaua București (Romania)	0–3	(France) Lyon	Bucharest, Romania
21:45 EEST (UTC+3)		Report	Fred 43'; Tiago 55'; Benzema 89'	Stadium: Steaua; Attendance: 25,000; Referee: Howard Webb (England)

17 October 2006 3	Steaua București (Romania)	1–4	(Spain) Real Madrid	Bucharest, Romania
21:45 EEST (UTC+3)	Badea 64'	Report	Ramos 9'; Raúl 34'; Robinho 56'; Van Nistelrooy 76'	Stadium: Steaua; Attendance: 28,000; Referee: Roberto Rosetti (Italy)

1 November 2006 4	Real Madrid (Spain)	1–0	(Romania) Steaua București	Madrid, Spain
20:45 CET (UTC+1)	Nicoliță 70' (o.g.)	Report		Stadium: Santiago Bernabéu; Attendance: 65,000; Referee: Konrad Plautz (Austria)

21 November 2006 5	Steaua București (Romania)	1–1	(Ukraine) Dynamo Kyiv	Bucharest, Romania
21:45 EET (UTC+2)	Dică 69'	Report	Cernat 29'	Stadium: Steaua; Attendance: 20,000; Referee: Jaroslav Jára (Czech Republic)

6 December 2006 6	Lyon (France)	1–1	(Romania) Steaua București	Lyon, France
20:45 CET (UTC+1)	Diarra 12'	Report	Dică 2'	Stadium: Stade de Gerland; Attendance: 39,531; Referee: Darko Čeferin (Slovenia)

=== UEFA Cup ===
==== Knockout stage ====
===== Round of 32 =====
15 February 2007 First leg	Steaua București (Romania)	0–2	(Spain) Sevilla	Bucharest, Romania
20:30 EET (UTC+2)		Report	Poulsen 41'; Kanouté 77' (pen.)	Stadium: Steaua; Attendance: 35,000; Referee: Florian Meyer (Germany)

22 February 2007 Second leg	Sevilla (Spain)	1–0 (3–0 agg.)	(Romania) Steaua București	Seville, Spain
20:45 CET (UTC+1)	Kerzhakov 45+3'	Report		Stadium: Ramón Sánchez Pizjuán; Attendance: 20,000; Referee: Stuart Dougal (Scotland)

== Staff ==
=== Management ===
- Head coach: Cosmin Olăroiu
- Assistant coach: Cătălin Necula, Dumitru Bolborea
- Goalkeeping coach: Vasile Iordache
- Fitness coach: Ferdinando Hippoliti
- Club doctor: Radu Paligora
- Medical Assistant: Mitică Neagu
- Masseurs: Constantin Teleașă, Cătălin Fandel,

=== Administration ===
- Owner: George Becali
- President : Valeriu Argăseală
- Vice-President: Teia Sponte
- President image: Viorel Păunescu
- General Manager: Mihai Stoica
- Director economic: Iulian Ghiorghișor
- Relații cu publicul: Paul Andone
