= 2005–06 FC Steaua București season =

Steaua București
2005–06 season
- Owner: George Becali
- President: Mihai Stoica
- Head coach: Oleh Protasov; Cosmin Olăroiu
- Stadium: Stadionul Steaua; Stadionul Național
- Divizia A: 1st (champions)
- Cupa României: First round
- Supercupa României: Runners-up
- Champions League: Third qualifying round
- UEFA Cup: Semi-finals
- Top goalscorer: League: Nicolae Dică (15); All: Nicolae Dică (19)
Home colours	Away colours

The 2005–06 season was the 58th season in the existence of FC Steaua București and the club's 58th consecutive season in the top flight of Romanian football. In addition to the domestic league, Steaua București participated in this season's edition of the Cupa României, the Supercupa României, the UEFA Champions League and the UEFA Cup.

== Players ==
=== First-team squad ===

The starting line-up in the 2005–06 season.

Squad at end of season

Note: Flags indicate national team as defined under FIFA eligibility rules; some limited exceptions apply. Players may hold more than one non-FIFA nationality.

No.	Pos.	Nation	Player
12	GK	ROU	Cornel Cernea
13	GK	POR	Carlos Fernandes
31	GK	ROU	Marius Toma
3	DF	ROU	Dorin Goian
5	DF	ROU	Daniel Bălan
6	DF	ROU	Mirel Rădoi (captain)
15	DF	ROU	Mihai Neșu
17	DF	ROU	Eugen Baciu
18	DF	ROU	Petre Marin
20	DF	ROU	George Ogăraru
23	DF	ROU	Alexandru Tudose
24	DF	ROU	Sorin Ghionea
8	MF	ROU	Andrei Enescu

No.	Pos.	Nation	Player
10	MF	ROU	Nicolae Dică
11	MF	ROU	Gabriel Boștină
14	MF	ROU	Vasilică Cristocea
16	MF	ROU	Bănel Nicoliță
22	MF	ROU	Sorin Paraschiv
28	MF	ROU	Florin Lovin
30	MF	ROU	Răzvan Ochiroșii
7	FW	ROU	Daniel Oprița
9	FW	ROU	Valentin Simion
19	FW	ROU	Victoraș Iacob
21	FW	ROU	Andrei Cristea
25	FW	ROU	Alin Lițu
27	FW	ROU	Laurențiu Diniță

=== Transfers ===
In:

- (Romania) Cornel Cernea - from Oțelul Galați
- (Romania) Daniel Bălan - returned from the loan from FC Vaslui
- (Romania) Andrei Enescu - from Building Vânju Mare
- (Romania) Victoraș Iacob - from Oțelul Galați
- (Portugal) Carlos Fernandes - from Boavista F.C.
- (Romania) Vasilică Cristocea - from Farul Constanța

Out:

- (Romania) Martin Tudor - to CFR Cluj
- (Romania) Dorinel Munteanu - to CFR Cluj
- (Belarus) Vasil Khamutowski - to Tom Tomsk
- (Romania) Tiberiu Curt - to Dinamo București

== Competitions ==
=== Overall record ===
Competition	First match	Last match	Starting round	Final position	Record							
Competition	First match	Last match	Starting round	Final position	Pld	W	D	L	GF	GA	GD	Win %
Divizia A	6 August 2005	7 June 2006	Matchday 1	Winners	30	19	7	4	49	16	+33	63.33
Cupa României	21 September 2005		Round of 32	Round of 32	1	0	1	0	0	0	+0	0.00
Supercupa României	31 July 2005		Final	Runners-up	1	0	0	1	2	3	−1	0.00
UEFA Champions League	27 July 2005	23 August 2005	Second qualifying round	Third qualifying round	4	1	2	1	7	5	+2	25.00
UEFA Cup	15 September 2005	27 April 2006	First round	Semi-finals	14	7	5	2	23	8	+15	50.00
Total					50	27	15	8	81	32	+49	54.00

Source: Competitions

=== Supercupa României ===
==== Results ====
31 July 2005 Final	Steaua București	2–3	Dinamo București	Bucharest
21:00	Dică 15'; Iacob 44'	Report	Bratu 38'; Bălţoi 69'; Niculescu 84'	Stadium: Cotroceni; Attendance: 12,000; Referee: Cristian Balaj

=== Divizia A ===
==== League table ====
Pos	Team	Pld	W	D	L	GF	GA	GD	Pts	Qualification or relegation
1	Steaua București (C)	30	19	7	4	49	16	+33	64	Qualification to Champions League second qualifying round
2	Rapid București	30	17	8	5	47	23	+24	59	Qualification to UEFA Cup first qualifying round
3	Dinamo București	30	17	5	8	56	32	+24	56 (Note: DIN 4-5 SPO; SPO 0-2 DIN)	Qualification to UEFA Cup first qualifying round
4	Sportul Studențesc București (R)	30	17	5	8	54	35	+19	55	Relegation to Liga II (Note: Sportul Studențesc was denied the right to participate for next season of Liga I because it failed to meet the licensing requirements, therefore Pandurii Lignitul Târgu Jiu (15th place) was spared from relegation.)
5	CFR Cluj	30	14	8	8	36	27	+9	50	

Source: LPF (in Romanian)
Rules for classification: 1) points; 2) head-to-head points; 3) head-to-head goal difference; 4) head-to-head goals scored; 5) goal difference; 6) number of goals scored.
(C) Champions; (R) Relegated

==== Results summary ====
Overall								Home						Away					
Pld	W	D	L	GF	GA	GD	Pts	W	D	L	GF	GA	GD	W	D	L	GF	GA	GD
30	19	7	4	49	16	+33	64	10	3	2	27	9	+18	9	4	2	22	7	+15

Source: LT

==== Results by round ====
Round	1	2	3	4	5	6	7	8	9	10	11	12	13	14	15	16	17	18	19	20	21	22	23	24	25	26	27	28	29	30
Ground	A	H	A	H	A	H	A	H	A	A	H	A	H	A	H	H	A	H	A	H	A	H	A	H	H	A	H	A	H	A
Result	W	W	D	W	W	D	W	W	W	D	L	L	W	W	D	D	D	W	W	W	D	W	W	W	L	L	W	W	W	W
Position	7	2	1	1	1	1	1	1	1	2	2	2	2	1	2	2	2	2	2	2	2	1	1	1	1	1	1	1	1	1

Source: Matches
A = Away; H = Home; W = Win; D = Draw; L = Loss

==== Matches ====
6 August 2005 1	Argeș Pitești	0–1	Steaua București	Pitești
18:00 EEST (UTC+3)	Negoiță (red card) 44'	Report	Dică 35'	Stadium: Nicolae Dobrin; Attendance: 7,000; Referee: Augustus Constantin

14 August 2005 2	Steaua București	4–0	Național București	Bucharest
20:15	Iacob 37'; Ogăraru 44'; Dică 84'; Paraschiv 90'	Report		Stadium: Steaua; Attendance: 8,000; Referee: Alexandru Tudor

20 August 2005 3	Politehnica Timișoara	0–0	Steaua București	Timișoara
21:00 EEST (UTC+3)		Report		Stadium: Dan Păltinișanu; Attendance: 32,000; Referee: Marian Salomir

28 August 2005 4	Steaua București	4–0	Oțelul Galați	Bucharest
21:00 EEST (UTC+3)	Paraschiv 9'; Dică 20'; Iacob 57'; Oprița 75'	Report		Stadium: Steaua; Attendance: 7,000; Referee: Victor Berbecaru

11 September 2005 5	Pandurii Târgu Jiu	1–2	Steaua București	Târgu Jiu
17:00 EEST (UTC+3)	Ștefan 48'	Report	Nicoliță 10'; Boștină 76'	Stadium: Tudor Vladimirescu; Attendance: 15,000; Referee: Sorin Corpodean

18 September 2005 6	Steaua București	2–2	Dinamo București	Bucharest
20:15 EEST (UTC+3)	Goian 6'; Dică 15'	Report	Zicu 41'; Bălțoi 87'	Stadium: Steaua; Attendance: 25,000; Referee: Alexandru Tudor

25 September 2005 7	Politehnica Iași	0–1	Steaua București	Iași
16:00 EEST (UTC+3)	Bordeanu (red card) 93'	Report	Boștină 65' (pen.)	Stadium: Emil Alexandrescu; Attendance: 13,000; Referee: Augustus Constantin

2 October 2005 8	Steaua București	1–0	FCM Bacău	Bucharest
16:00 EEST (UTC+3)	Paraschiv 27'	Report		Stadium: Steaua; Attendance: 2,500; Referee: Marius Martiș

16 October 2005 9	Farul Constanța	1–4	Steaua București	Constanța
20:15 EEST (UTC+3)	Cristocea 48'	Report	Iacob 16', 70'; Dică 36'; Boștină 77'	Stadium: Gheorghe Hagi; Attendance: 10,000; Referee: Marian Salomir

23 October 2005 10	Rapid București	0–0	Steaua București	Bucharest
20:15 EEST (UTC+3)		Report	Nicoliță (red card) 31'	Stadium: Giulești-Valentin Stănescu; Attendance: 16,000; Referee: Alexandru Tudor

29 October 2005 11	Steaua București	0–1	Gloria Bistrița	Bucharest
20:30 EEST (UTC+3)		Report	Mureșan 81'	Stadium: Steaua; Attendance: 0 Referee: Augustus Constantin

6 November 2005 12	CFR Cluj	1–0	Steaua București	Cluj-Napoca
14:30 EET (UTC+2)	Coroian 9'	Report		Stadium: Dr. Constantin Rădulescu; Attendance: 12,000; Referee: Cristian Balaj

20 November 2005 13	Steaua București	4–1	Sportul Studențesc	Bucharest
20:15 EET (UTC+2)	Rădoi 19'; Dică 23'; Nicoliță 45'; Iacob 57'	Report	Bălan 13' (pen.)	Stadium: Steaua; Attendance: 0 Referee: Marian Salomir

26 November 2005 14	Jiul Petroșani	1–2	Steaua București	Petroșani
14:00 EET (UTC+2)	Mihart 25'; Gheorghe (red card) 58'	Report	Nicoliță 45'; Dică 57'	Stadium: Jiul; Attendance: 12,000; Referee: Ionică Serea

4 December 2005 15	Steaua București	2–2	Vaslui	Bucharest
18:00 EET (UTC+2)	Dică 8'; Paraschiv (red card) 54'; Boștină 75'; Goian (yellow card) 88' (yellow-red card) 90+3'	Report	I. Badea 62' (pen.); V. Badea 67'	Stadium: Steaua; Attendance: 12,000; Referee: Lucian Dan

12 March 2006 16	Steaua București	0–0	Argeș Pitești	Bucharest
20:30 EET (UTC+2)		Report		Stadium: Național; Attendance: 3,000; Referee: Cristian Balaj

19 March 2006 17	Național București	0–0	Steaua București	Bucharest
20:30 EET (UTC+2)		Report		Stadium: Cotroceni; Attendance: 10,000; Referee: Alexandru Deaconu

26 March 2006 18	Steaua București	2–1	Politehnica Timișoara	Bucharest
20:30 EEST (UTC+3)	Dică 4'; Nicoliță 21'	Report	Bălace 40'	Stadium: Național; Attendance: 20,000; Referee: Ionică Serea

2 April 2006 19	Oțelul Galați	0–3	Steaua București	Galați
17:00 EEST (UTC+3)		Report	Cristea 35'; Rădoi 47'; Cristea 90+1'	Stadium: Oțelul; Attendance: 16,000; Referee: Sebastian Colțescu

9 April 2006 21	Dinamo București	1–1	Steaua București	Bucharest
20:30 EEST (UTC+3)	Niculescu 38'; Mărgăritescu (yellow card) 43' (yellow-red card) 45'	Report	Ogăraru (red card) 37'; Cristocea 90+2'	Stadium: Dinamo; Attendance: 10,000; Referee: Pasquale Rodomonti (Italy)

12 April 2006 22	Steaua București	1–0	Politehnica Iași	Bucharest
20:00 EEST (UTC+3)	Dică 64' (pen.)	Report		Stadium: Național; Attendance: 3,500; Referee: Victor Berbecaru

17 May 2006 23	Bacău	0–2	Steaua București	Bacău
18:00 EEST (UTC+3)		Report	Cristea 37'; Lovin 65'	Stadium: Municipal; Attendance: 13,000; Referee: Vasile Bratu

22 April 2006 24	Steaua București	3–0	Farul Constanța	Bucharest
20:30 EEST (UTC+3)	Nicoliță 48', 78'; Dică 58'	Report		Stadium: Național; Attendance: 6,000; Referee: Robert Dumitru

30 April 2006 25	Steaua București	0–2	Rapid București	Bucharest
20:30 EEST (UTC+3)		Report	Pancu 21'; Moldovan 31'	Stadium: Național; Attendance: 17,000; Referee: Damien Ledentu (France)

3 May 2006 20	Steaua București	1–0	Pandurii Târgu Jiu	Bucharest
20:00 EEST (UTC+3)	Naicu 79' (o.g.)	Report		Stadium: Național; Attendance: 6,000; Referee: Marian Salomir

6 May 2006 26	Gloria Bistrița	1–0	Steaua București	Bistrița
18:00 EEST (UTC+3)	Matei 12'	Report	Ghionea (yellow card) 16' (yellow-red card) 94'; Iacob (yellow card) 80' (yellow-red card) 89'	Stadium: Gloria; Attendance: 10,000; Referee: Ionică Serea

14 May 2006 27	Steaua București	2–0	CFR Cluj	Bucharest
20:30 EEST (UTC+3)	Goian 58'; Dică 85'	Report		Stadium: Național; Attendance: 20,000; Referee: Augustus Constantin

21 May 2006 28	Sportul Studențesc	1–2	Steaua București	Bucharest
17:00 EEST (UTC+3)	Bălan 52'	Report	Nicoliță 48'; Rădoi 57' (pen.)	Stadium: Regie; Attendance: 5,000; Referee: Marian Salomir

3 June 2006 29	Steaua București	1–0	Jiul Petroșani	Bucharest
20:30 EEST (UTC+3)	Cristocea 16'	Report		Stadium: Național; Attendance: 0 Referee: Tiberiu Lajos

7 June 2006 30	Vaslui	0–4	Steaua București	Vaslui
17:00 EEST (UTC+3)		Report	Rădoi 5' (pen.); Dică 10', 43', 56'	Stadium: Municipal; Attendance: 10,000; Referee: Sebastian Colțescu

=== Cupa României ===
==== Results ====
21 September 2005 Round of 32	Rapid II București	0–0 (a.e.t.) (8–7 p)	Steaua București	Bucharest
15:00 EEST (UTC+3)		Report		Stadium: Giulești-Valentin Stănescu; Attendance: 1,000; Referee: Robert Dumitru
	Penalties
	Rusu (penalty scored); Pandele (penalty scored); Dumitrescu (penalty scored); Ene (penalty scored); I. Dumitru (penalty scored); Oprea (penalty scored); G. Pena (penalty scored); Negruț (penalty scored)		(penalty scored) Rădoi; (penalty scored) Fl. Dumitru; (penalty scored) Diniță; (penalty scored) Baciu; (penalty scored) Oprița; (penalty scored) P. Marin; (penalty scored) Goian; (penalty missed) Neșu

=== UEFA Champions League ===
==== Qualifying rounds ====
===== Second qualifying round =====
27 July 2005 First leg	Shelbourne (Republic of Ireland)	0–0	(Romania) Steaua București	Dublin, Republic of Ireland
19:30 WEST (UTC+1)		Report		Stadium: Tolka Park; Attendance: 8,500; Referee: Romans Lajuks (Latvia)

3 August 2005 Second leg	Steaua București (Romania)	4–1 (4–1 agg.)	(Republic of Ireland) Shelbourne	Bucharest, Romania
20:30 EEST (UTC+3)	Nicoliță 18'; Iacob 27'; Diniță 61'; Oprița 90+4' (pen.)	Report	J. Byrne 38'	Stadium: Steaua; Attendance: 8,775; Referee: Claude Colombo (France)

===== Third qualifying round =====
10 August 2005 First leg	Steaua București (Romania)	1–1	(Norway) Rosenborg	Bucharest, Romania
21:00 EEST (UTC+3)	Iacob 30'	Report	Helstad 85'	Stadium: Steaua; Attendance: 11,500; Referee: Eric Braamhaar (Netherlands)

23 August 2005 Second leg	Rosenborg (Norway)	3–2 (4–3 agg.)	(Romania) Steaua București	Trondheim, Norway
20:45 CEST (UTC+2)	Solli 38'; Ødegaard 57'; Rădoi 60' (o.g.)	Report	Rădoi 74'; Iacob 76'	Stadium: Lerkendal; Attendance: 13,051; Referee: Alain Sars (France)

=== UEFA Cup ===
==== First round ====
15 September 2005 First leg	Vålerenga (Norway)	0–3	(Romania) Steaua București	Oslo, Norway
19:30 CEST (UTC+2)		Report	Rădoi 24'; Iacob 35'; Goian 74'	Stadium: Ullevaal; Attendance: 15,000; Referee: Ceri Richards (Wales)

29 September 2005 Second leg	Steaua București (Romania)	3–1 (6–1 agg.)	(Norway) Vålerenga	Constanța, Romania
19:00 EEST (UTC+3)	Dică 30'; Boștină 41'; Iacob 48'	Report	Hulsker 55'	Stadium: Gheorghe Hagi; Attendance: 10,000; Referee: João Ferreira (Portugal)

==== Group stage ====
Group C standings
Pos	Team	Pld	W	D	L	GF	GA	GD	Pts	Qualification
1	(Romania) Steaua București	4	2	2	0	7	0	+7	8	Advance to knockout stage
2	(France) Lens	4	2	1	1	7	5	+2	7	Advance to knockout stage
3	(Germany) Hertha BSC	4	1	3	0	1	0	+1	6	Advance to knockout stage
4	(Italy) Sampdoria	4	1	2	1	4	3	+1	5	
5	(Sweden) Halmstads BK	4	0	0	4	1	12	−11	0	

===== Results =====
20 October 2005 1	Steaua București (Romania)	4–0	(France) Lens	Bucharest, Romania
20:00 EEST (UTC+3)	Iacob 13'; Goian 16'; Dică 43', 63'	Report		Stadium: Steaua; Attendance: 22,000; Referee: Athanassios Briakos (Greece)

3 November 2005 2	Sampdoria (Italy)	0–0	(Romania) Steaua București	Genoa, Italy
20:45 CET (UTC+1)		Report		Stadium: Luigi Ferraris; Attendance: 17,100; Referee: Grzegorz Gilewski (Poland)

30 November 2005 3	Steaua București (Romania)	3–0	(Sweden) Halmstad	Bucharest, Romania
21:45 EET (UTC+2)	Rădoi 9'; Goian 63'; Iacob 73'	Report		Stadium: Steaua; Attendance: 23,000; Referee: Emil Božinovski (Macedonia)

15 December 2005 4	Hertha BSC (Germany)	0–0	(Romania) Steaua București	Berlin, Germany
20:45 CET (UTC+1)		Report		Stadium: Olympiastadion; Attendance: 15,603; Referee: Pieter Vink (Netherlands)

==== Knockout phase ====
===== Round of 32 =====
15 February 2006 First leg	Heerenveen (Netherlands)	1–3	(Romania) Steaua București	Heerenveen, Netherlands
19:15 CET (UTC+1)	Bruggink 24'	Report	Dică 29'; Goian 76'; Paraschiv 78'	Stadium: Abe Lenstra; Attendance: 20,500; Referee: Stuart Dougal (Scotland)

23 February 2006 Second leg	Steaua București (Romania)	0–1 (3–2 agg.)	(Netherlands) Heerenveen	Bucharest, Romania
19:00 EET (UTC+2)		Report	Bruggink 85'	Stadium: Național; Attendance: 50,000; Referee: Jaroslav Jára (Czech Republic)

===== Round of 16 =====
9 March 2006 First leg	Steaua București (Romania)	0–0	(Spain) Real Betis	Bucharest, Romania
19:00 EET (UTC+2)		Report		Stadium: Național; Attendance: 45,003; Referee: Yuri Baskakov (Russia)

16 March 2006 Second leg	Real Betis (Spain)	0–3 (0–3 agg.)	(Romania) Steaua București	Seville, Spain
21:30 CET (UTC+1)		Report	Nicoliță 54', 82'; Iacob 78'	Stadium: Manuel Ruiz de Lopera; Attendance: 30,000; Referee: Massimo De Santis (Italy)

===== Quarter-finals =====
30 March 2006 First leg	Rapid București (Romania)	1–1	(Romania) Steaua București	Bucharest, Romania
20:45 EEST (UTC+3)	Moldovan 50'	Report	Nicoliță 5'	Stadium: Giulești-Valentin Stănescu; Attendance: 19,000; Referee: Wolfgang Stark (Germany)

6 April 2006 Second leg	Steaua București (Romania)	0–0 (1–1 a agg.)	(Romania) Rapid București	Bucharest, Romania
20:30 EEST (UTC+3)		Report		Stadium: Național; Attendance: 50,000; Referee: Luis Medina Cantalejo (Spain)

===== Semi-finals =====
20 April 2006 First leg	Steaua București (Romania)	1–0	(England) Middlesbrough	Bucharest, Romania
20:45 EEST (UTC+3)	Dică 30'	Report		Stadium: Național; Attendance: 41,000; Referee: Alain Hamer (Luxembourg)

27 April 2006 Second leg	Middlesbrough (England)	4–2 (4–3 agg.)	(Romania) Steaua București	Middlesbrough, England
20:00 WEST (UTC+1)	Maccarone 33', 89'; Viduka 64'; Riggott 73'	Report	Dică 16'; Goian 24'	Stadium: Riverside; Attendance: 34,622; Referee: Ľuboš Micheľ (Slovakia)
