= 2007–08 FC Steaua București season =

Steaua București
2007–08 season
- Owner: George Becali
- President: Valeriu Argăseală
- Head coach: Gheorghe Hagi; Massimo Pedrazzini; Marius Lăcătuș
- Stadium: Stadionul Steaua
- Liga I: 2nd
- Cupa României: Round of 16
- Champions League: Group stage
- Top goalscorer: League: Nicolae Dică (9); All: Nicolae Dică (10)
Home colours	Away colours

The 2007–08 season was the 60th season in the existence of FC Steaua București and the club's 60th consecutive season in the top flight of Romanian football. In addition to the domestic league, Steaua București participated in this season's edition of the Cupa României and the UEFA Champions League.

== Players ==
=== Transfers ===
==== In ====
Total spending: €11,06M
Player	From	Fee
(Romania) Eric Bicfalvi	(Romania) Jiul Petroșanii	€0.3M
(Romania) Valentin Bădoi	(Germany) Rapid București	€0.55M
(Romania) Mihai Guriță	(Germany) Farul Constanța	€0.1M
(Romania) Cosmin Vâtcă	(Romania) Oțelul Galați	€0.5M
(Romania) Adrian Neaga	(South Korea) Seongnam Ilhwa Chunma	€0.61M
(Nigeria) Ifeanyi Emeghara	(Romania) Politehnica Știința Timișoara	€1.2M
(Poland) Paweł Golański	(Poland) Korona Kielce	€1.3M
(Romania) Alexandru Iacob	(Romania) Corvinul Hunedoara	€0.4M
(Romania) Emil Ninu	(Romania) Progresul București	€0.2M
(Colombia) Róbinson Zapata	(Colombia) Cúcuta Deportivo	€0.5M
(Romania) Ionuț Rada	(Romania) Rapid București	€0.8M
(Romania) Dorel Zaharia	(Romania) Gloria Bistrița	€0.5M
(Romania) Mihăiță Pleșan	(Romania) Politehnica Știința Timișoara	€1.5M
(Romania) Romeo Surdu	(Romania) CFR Cluj	€1M
(Central African Republic) Habib Habibou	(Belgium) Charleroi	Loan
(Nigeria) Dino Eze	(Romania) Gloria Buzau	€0.2M
(Colombia) Pepe Moreno	(Argentina) Independiente	Loan
(Peru) Andrés Mendoza	(Ukraine) Metalurh Donetsk	Free
(Colombia) Dayro Moreno	(Colombia) Once Caldas	€1.4M
(Romania) Răzvan Ochiroșii	(Romania) Gloria Buzău	Back from loan
(Romania) Alexandru Iacob	(Romania) Gloria Buzău	Back from loan
(Romania) Alin Lițu	(Romania) Gloria Buzău	Back from loan
(Romania) Emil Ninu	(Romania) Gloria Buzău	Back from loan
(Romania) Alexandru Tudose	(Romania) Gloria Buzău	Back from loan
(Romania) Eric Bicfalvi	(Romania) Gloria Buzău	Back from loan
(Nigeria) Dino Eze	(Romania) Gloria Buzău	Back from loan
(Brazil) André Nunes	(Romania) Gloria Buzău	Back from loan
(Romania) Valentin Simion	(Romania) Gloria Buzău	Back from loan
(Romania) Vasilică Cristocea	(Romania) Ceahlăul Piatra Neamț	Back from loan
(Romania) Marius Croitoru	(Romania) Ceahlăul Piatra Neamț	Back from loan

==== Out ====
Total income: €5,06M
Player	New team	Fee
(Romania) Daniel Oprița	(Romania) Dinamo București	Free
(Romania) Stelian Stancu	(Romania) Politehnica Știința Timișoara	€0.2M
(Romania) Sorin Paraschiv	(Italy) Rimini	€0.5M
(Brazil) Élton	(Saudi Arabia) Al-Nasr	€0.5M
(France) Cyril Théréau	(Belgium) Anderlecht	€2.9M
(Israel) Klemi Saban	(Israel) Maccabi Netanya	Free
(Romania) Gigel Coman	(Romania) Universitatea Cluj	€0.1M
(Romania) Gabriel Boștină	(Romania) Dinamo București	€0.1M
(Romania) Mihai Guriță	(Romania) Farul Constanța	Free
(Brazil) Andrey	(Brazil) Cruzeiro	Released
(Romania) Valentin Bădoi	(Romania) Politehnica Știința Timișoara	Free
(Romania) Dorel Zaharia	(Romania) UTA Arad	€0.26M
(Romania) Victoraș Iacob	(Germany) Kaiserslautern	€0.5M
(Romania) Vasilică Cristocea	(Romania) Steaua II București	Second team
(Romania) Marius Croitoru	(Romania) Steaua II București	Second team
(Romania) Alexandru Iacob	(Romania) Steaua II București	Second team

==== Loan out ====
Player	Team
(Romania) Alexandru Iacob	(Romania) Gloria Buzău
(Romania) Alin Lițu	(Romania) Gloria Buzău
(Romania) Emil Ninu	(Romania) Gloria Buzău
(Romania) Alexandru Tudose	(Romania) Gloria Buzău
(Romania) Eric Bicfalvi	(Romania) Gloria Buzău
(Nigeria) Dino Eze	(Romania) Gloria Buzău
(Brazil) André Nunes	(Romania) Gloria Buzău
(Romania) Valentin Simion	(Romania) Gloria Buzău
(Romania) Vasilică Cristocea	(Romania) Ceahlăul Piatra Neamț
(Romania) Marius Croitoru	(Romania) Ceahlăul Piatra Neamț

== Statistics ==
=== Player stats ===
No.	Pos	Nat	Player	Total		Liga I		Cupa României		UEFA Champions League	
No.	Pos	Nat	Player	Apps	Goals	Apps	Goals	Apps	Goals	Apps	Goals
1	GK	(Colombia) COL	Róbinson Zapata	42	0	33	0	0	0	9	0
3	DF	(Romania) ROU	Dorin Goian	31	5	23	2	0	0	8	3
4	DF	(Poland) POL	Paweł Golański	27	1	21	1	2	0	4	0
5	DF	(Romania) ROU	Ionuț Rada	28	1	17	1	1	0	10	0
6	MF	(Romania) ROU	Mirel Rădoi	19	0	16	0	0	0	3	0
8	MF	(Romania) ROU	Ovidiu Petre	35	3	26	2	0	0	9	1
9	FW	(Romania) ROU	Valentin Badea	24	4	16	2	2	1	6	1
10	FW	(Romania) ROU	Nicolae Dică	40	10	30	9	0	0	10	1
11	FW	(Central African Republic) CTA	Habib Habibou	8	1	8	1	0	0	0	0
12	GK	(Romania) ROU	Cornel Cernea	3	0	1	0	1	0	1	0
13	DF	(Nigeria) NGA	Ifeanyi Emeghara	18	0	12	0	1	0	5	0
15	DF	(Romania) ROU	Mihai Neșu	26	0	21	0	0	0	5	0
16	MF	(Romania) ROU	Bănel Nicoliță	35	4	27	3	0	0	8	1
17	DF	(Romania) ROU	Eugen Baciu	17	0	14	0	2	0	1	0
18	DF	(Romania) ROU	Petre Marin	26	0	18	0	1	0	7	0
20	MF	(Romania) ROU	Florin Lovin	32	0	24	0	0	0	8	0
21	FW	(Romania) ROU	Răzvan Ochiroșii	0	0	0	0	0	0	0	0
22	FW	(Colombia) COL	Pepe Moreno	15	5	15	5	0	0	0	0
23	MF	(Romania) ROU	Mihăiță Pleșan (Note: Mihăiță Pleșan played 2 games for Politehnica Știința Timișoara in Liga I before signing and scored 3 goals.)	15	2	14	2	0	0	1	0
24	DF	(Romania) ROU	Sorin Ghionea	12	1	12	1	0	0	0	0
25	FW	(Romania) ROU	Adrian Neaga	35	4	26	3	1	0	8	1
27	FW	(Colombia) COL	Dayro Moreno	11	5	11	5	0	0	0	0
29	FW	(Peru) PER	Andrés Mendoza	15	2	15	2	0	0	0	0
82	GK	(Romania) ROU	Cosmin Vâtcă	2	0	0	0	2	0	0	0
84	FW	(Romania) ROU	Romeo Surdu	20	0	12	0	2	0	6	0
Players sold or loaned out during the season
2	DF	(Romania) ROU	Emil Ninu	2	0	0	0	2	0	0	0
7	MF	(Romania) ROU	Eric Bicfalvi	15	1	9	1	2	0	4	0
11	MF	(Romania) ROU	Gabriel Boștină	1	0	1	0	0	0	0	0
14	MF	(Romania) ROU	Vasilică Cristocea	13	0	8	0	2	0	3	0
19	FW	(Romania) ROU	Victoraș Iacob	12	2	7	2	1	0	4	0
26	MF	(Romania) ROU	Marius Croitoru	21	0	12	0	1	0	8	0
26	FW	(Nigeria) NGA	Dino Eze	0	0	0	0	0	0	0	0
29	MF	(Romania) ROU	Valentin Bădoi	17	0	10	0	2	0	5	0
30	FW	(Romania) ROU	Dorel Zaharia	22	7	14	1	2	3	6	3
31	DF	(Romania) ROU	Alexandru Iacob	0	0	0	0	0	0	0	0
34	FW	(Romania) ROU	Mihai Guriță (Note: Mihai Guriță played 4 games for FC Gloria Buzău in Liga I as a loaned by Steaua București and scored 0 goals.)	0	0	0	0	0	0	0	0

== Competitions ==
=== Overall record ===
Competition	First match	Last match	Starting round	Final position	Record							
Competition	First match	Last match	Starting round	Final position	Pld	W	D	L	GF	GA	GD	Win %
Liga I	27 July 2007	7 May 2008	Matchday 1	2nd	34	23	6	5	51	19	+32	67.65
Cupa României	26 September 2007	6 December 2007	Round of 32	Round of 16	2	1	0	1	4	2	+2	50.00
UEFA Champions League	31 July 2007	12 December 2007	Second qualifying round	Group stage	10	3	2	5	11	13	−2	30.00
Total					46	27	8	11	66	34	+32	58.70

Source: Competitions

=== Liga I ===
==== League table ====
Pos	Team	Pld	W	D	L	GF	GA	GD	Pts	Qualification or relegation
1	CFR Cluj (C)	34	23	7	4	52	22	+30	76	Qualification to Champions League group stage
2	Steaua București	34	23	6	5	51	19	+32	75	Qualification to Champions League third qualifying round
3	Rapid București	34	18	7	9	52	31	+21	61 (Note: RAP: 7 pts; DIN: 5 pts; UNI: 3 pts)	Qualification to UEFA Cup first round
4	Dinamo București	34	17	10	7	55	36	+19	61	Qualification to UEFA Cup first round
5	Unirea Urziceni	34	16	13	5	42	24	+18	61	Qualification to UEFA Cup first round

Source: LT (in Romanian)
Rules for classification: 1) points; 2) head-to-head points; 3) head-to-head goal difference; 4) head-to-head goals scored; 5) goal difference; 6) number of goals scored.
(C) Champions

==== Results summary ====
Overall								Home						Away					
Pld	W	D	L	GF	GA	GD	Pts	W	D	L	GF	GA	GD	W	D	L	GF	GA	GD
34	23	6	5	51	19	+32	75	14	3	0	31	5	+26	9	3	5	20	14	+6

Source: LT

==== Results by round ====
Round	1	2	3	4	5	6	7	8	9	10	11	12	13	14	15	16	17	18	19	20	21	22	23	24	25	26	27	28	29	30	31	32	33	34
Ground	H	A	H	A	H	A	H	A	H	A	H	A	H	A	H	H	A	A	H	A	H	A	H	A	H	A	H	A	H	A	H	A	A	H
Result	W	W	W	D	D	L	D	D	W	W	W	L	W	L	W	W	D	W	W	L	W	W	W	W	W	W	W	W	W	W	D	W	L	W
Position	5	1	1	2	4	7	7	8	7	7	6	7	7	7	5	5	5	4	4	5	3	3	2	2	2	2	2	1	1	1	2	1	2	2

Source: Matches
A = Away; H = Home; W = Win; D = Draw; L = Loss

==== Matches ====
27 July 2007 Round 1	Steaua București	2–1	Ceahlăul Piatra Neamț	București
20:30	Dică 14' (pen.), 62'		12' (pen.) Vranjković	Stadium: Steaua; Attendance: 0 (closed doors) (Note: Following 2-matchday suspension from previous season); Referee: Sebastian Colțescu

3 August 2007 Round 2	Farul Constanța	0–1	Steaua București	Constanța
20:30			62' Dică	Stadium: Farul; Attendance: 15,000; Referee: Alexandru Tudor

11 August 2007 Round 3	Steaua București	1–0	Politehnica Iași	București
20:45	Bicfalvi 79'			Stadium: Steaua; Attendance: 12,000; Referee: Cristian Balaj

19 August 2007 Round 4	CFR Cluj	0–0	Steaua București	Cluj-Napoca
20:30				Stadium: Dr. Constantin Rădulescu; Attendance: 12,000; Referee: Augustus Constantin

2 September 2007 Round 6	Unirea Urziceni	1–0	Steaua București	Urziceni
17:00	Galamaz 90+1'			Stadium: Tineretului; Attendance: 7,000; Referee: Tiberiu Lajos

16 September 2007 Round 7	Steaua București	0–0	Rapid București	București
20:30				Stadium: Steaua; Attendance: 22,000; Referee: Alexandru Deaconu

22 September 2007 Round 8	UTA Arad	1–1	Steaua București	Arad
17:00	Edson 82' (pen.)		57' Nicoliță	Stadium: Francisc von Neumann; Attendance: 17,000; Referee: Teodor Crăciunescu

29 September 2007 Round 9	Steaua București	1–0	Vaslui	București
20:45	Rada 65'			Stadium: Steaua; Attendance: 7,472; Referee: Aurel Bogaciu

7 October 2007 Round 10	Dacia Mioveni	1–2	Steaua București	Mioveni
20:30	Rada 35' (o.g.)		45+2', 90' Iacob	Stadium: Dacia; Attendance: 4,500; Referee: Victor Berbecaru

27 October 2007 Round 12	Universitatea Cluj	2–1	Steaua București	Cluj-Napoca
15:00	Jovanović 34'; Goga 85'		21' Nicoliță	Stadium: Ion Moina; Attendance: 7,000; Referee: István Kovács

31 October 2007 Round 13	Steaua București	3–1	Oțelul Galați	București
20:30	Dică 7' (65), pen.' Semeghin 32' (o.g.)		52' Székely	Stadium: Steaua; Attendance: 17,000; Referee: Ionel Ivan

4 November 2007 Round 14	Politehnica Știința Timișoara	2–0	Steaua București	Timișoara
20:30	Rušič 13'; Mansour 90+1'			Stadium: Dan Păltinișanu; Attendance: 20,000; Referee: Augustus Constantin

10 November 2007 Round 15	Steaua București	1–0	FC U Craiova	București
20:45	Nicoliță 27'			Stadium: Steaua; Attendance: 1,500; Referee: Alexandru Tudor

12 November 2007 Round 5 (P)	Steaua București	0–0	Pandurii Târgu Jiu	București
20:30				Stadium: Steaua; Attendance: 7,249; Referee: Alexandru Ioniță

24 November 2007 Round 16	Steaua București	1–0	Dinamo București	București
20:30	Neaga 67'			Stadium: Steaua; Attendance: 23,552; Referee: Alexandru Deaconu

30 November 2007 Round 17	Gloria Buzău	1–1	Steaua București	Buzău
13:00	Bunică 90+1'		78' Dică	Stadium: Crâng; Attendance: 11,000; Referee: ștefan Erdei

3 December 2007 Round 11 (P)	Steaua București	1–0	Gloria Bistrița	București
20:45	Toma 78' (o.g.)			Stadium: Steaua; Attendance: 4,000; Referee: Marius Avram

9 December 2007 Round 18	Ceahlăul Piatra Neamț	0–1	Steaua București	Piatra Neamț
19:00			19' Badea	Stadium: Ceahlăul; Attendance: 7,000; Referee: Aurelian Bogaciu

16 December 2007 Round 19	Steaua București	3–0	Farul Constanța	București
17:00	Zaharia 17'; Dică 78'; Șchiopu 84' (o.g.)			Stadium: Steaua; Attendance: 1,200; Referee: Ionel Ivan

24 February 2008 Round 20	Politehnica Iași	2–1	Steaua București	Iași
20:30	Nicoliță 3' (o.g.); Onuț 60'		47' Mendoza	Stadium: Emil Alexandrescu; Attendance: 12,000; Referee: Teodor Crăciunescu

2 March 2008 Round 21	Steaua București	3–1	CFR Cluj	București
20:30	Hirschfeld 26' (o.g.); Dayro Moreno 56'; Ov. Petre 90+1'		4' Trică	Stadium: Steaua; Attendance: 26,000; Referee: Alexandru Tudor

8 March 2008 Round 22	Pandurii Târgu Jiu	0–1	Steaua București	Târgu Jiu
20:45			64' Ov. Petre	Stadium: Municipal Tudor Vladimirescu; Attendance: 10,000; Referee: Sebastian Colțescu

16 March 2008 Round 23	Steaua București	1–0	Unirea Urziceni	București
20:30	Habibou 82'			Stadium: Steaua; Attendance: 21,126; Referee: Ionel Ivan

20 March 2008 Round 24	Rapid București	0–3 (Awarded)	Steaua București	București
20:30	Săpunaru 68'			Stadium: Giulești Valentin Stănescu; Attendance: 10,000; Referee: Alexandru Deaconu
Note: The match was interrupted in 72nd minute because the referee was hit with an object from the stands, by the fans of Rapid, even the hosts were leading with 1–0; the match was awarded with 3–0 for Steaua.

23 March 2008 Round 25	Steaua București	2–1	UTA Arad	București
20:30	Pepe Moreno 65'; Badea 90+1'		7' Mihuț	Stadium: Steaua; Attendance: 15,000; Referee: Lucian Dan

30 March 2008 Round 26	Vaslui	0–1	Steaua București	Vaslui
16:00			66' Pepe Moreno	Stadium: Municipal; Attendance: 10,000; Referee: István Kovács

6 April 2008 Round 27	Steaua București	2–0	Dacia Mioveni	București
20:30	Goian 49'; Pepe Moreno 56'			Stadium: Steaua; Attendance: 4,000; Referee: Victor Berbecaru

10 April 2008 Round 28	Gloria Bistrița	1–3	Steaua București	Reghin
17:00	Toma 44'		19', 24' Dică; 62' (o.g.) Hadzibulic	Stadium: Avântul; Attendance: 5,000; Referee: Tiberiu Lajos

14 April 2008 Round 29	Steaua București	4–0	Universitatea Cluj	București
20:30	Pleșan 7'; Golański 66'; Neaga 90+1'; Dayro Moreno 90+3'			Stadium: Steaua; Attendance: 12,000; Referee: Mugurel Drăgănescu

19 April 2008 Round 30	Oțelul Galați	0–1	Steaua București	Galați
17:00			76' Pleșan	Stadium: Oțelul; Attendance: 12,000; Referee: Cristian Balaj

22 April 2008 Round 31	Steaua București	1–1	Politehnica Știința Timișoara	București
20:30	Goian 49'		65' Bucur	Stadium: Steaua; Attendance: 16,000; Referee: Sebastian Colțescu

26 April 2008 Round 32	FC U Craiova	1–2	Steaua București	Craiova
17:00	Prepeliță 77'		75' Pepe Moreno; 83' Dayro Moreno	Stadium: Extensiv; Attendance: 7,000; Referee: Ovidiu Hațegan

4 May 2008 Round 33	Dinamo București	2–1	Steaua București	București
20:30	Bratu 30'; Dănciulescu 52'		75' Ghionea	Stadium: Dinamo; Attendance: 14,000; Referee: Alexandru Tudor

7 May 2008 Round 34	Steaua București	5–0	Gloria Buzău	București
17:00	Pepe Moreno 20'; Dayro Moreno 62', 77'; Neaga 67'; Mendoza 72'			Stadium: Steaua; Attendance: 12,000; Referee: Cristian Balaj

=== Cupa României ===
==== Results ====
26 September 2007 Round of 32	Bacău	0–4	Steaua București	Bacău
20:30			38', 56', 83' Zaharia; 61' (pen.) Badea	Stadium: Municipal; Attendance: 6,000; Referee: Alexandru Tudor

6 December 2007 Round of 16	Unirea Urziceni	2–0	Steaua București	Urziceni
20:30	Petre 18'; Negru 46'			Stadium: Tineretului; Attendance: 9,000; Referee: Ovidiu Hațegan

=== UEFA Champions League ===
==== Qualifying rounds ====
===== Second qualifying round =====
31 July 2007 First leg	Zagłębie Lubin (Poland)	0–1	(Romania) Steaua București	Lubin, Poland
20:45			54' Goian	Stadium: Górniczy Ośrodek Sportu; Attendance: 7,000; Referee: Selçuk Dereli (Turkey)

8 August 2007 Second leg	Steaua București (Romania)	2–1 (3–1 agg.)	(Poland) Zagłębie Lubin	București, Romania
20:30	Nicoliță 38'; Zaharia 82'		29' Stasiak	Stadium: Steaua; Attendance: 20,000; Referee: Mark Clattenburg (England)

===== Third qualifying round =====
15 August 2007 First leg	BATE Borisov (Belarus)	2–2	(Romania) Steaua București	Borisov, Belarus
20:00	Radzkow 40'; Bliznyuk 90+3'		58' Goian; 84' Dică	Stadium: City Stadium; Attendance: 4,300; Referee: Matteo Trefoloni (Italy)

29 August 2007 Second leg	Steaua București (Romania)	2–0 (4–2 agg.)	(Belarus) BATE Borisov	București, Romania
20:30	Zaharia 12'; Neaga 54'			Stadium: Steaua; Attendance: 24,254; Referee: Pieter Vink (Netherlands)

==== Group stage ====
Group H standings
Pos	Team	Pld	W	D	L	GF	GA	GD	Pts	Qualification	SEV	ARS	SLP	STE
1	(Spain) Sevilla	6	5	0	1	14	7	+7	15	Advance to knockout stage	—	3–1	4–2	2–1
2	(England) Arsenal	6	4	1	1	14	4	+10	13	Advance to knockout stage	3–0	—	7–0	2–1
3	(Czech Republic) Slavia Prague	6	1	2	3	5	16	−11	5	Transfer to UEFA Cup	0–3	0–0	—	2–1
4	(Romania) Steaua București	6	0	1	5	4	10	−6	1		0–2	0–1	1–1	—

Source: RSSSF

===== Results =====
19 September 2007 Matchday 1	Slavia Prague (Czech Republic)	2–1	(Romania) Steaua București	Prague, Czech Republic
20:45	Šenkeřík 13'; Belaid 63'		33' Goian	Stadium: Evžena Rošického; Attendance: 15,723; Referee: Olegário Benquerença (Portugal)

2 October 2007 Matchday 2	Steaua București (Romania)	0–1	(England) Arsenal	București, Romania
21:45			76' van Persie	Stadium: Steaua; Attendance: 12,807; Referee: Terje Hauge (Norway)

23 October 2007 Matchday 3	Sevilla (Spain)	2–1	(Romania) Steaua București	Seville, Spain
20:45	Kanouté 5'; Luís Fabiano 17'		63' Ov. Petre	Stadium: Ramón Sánchez Pizjuán; Attendance: 28,945; Referee: Roberto Rosetti (Italy)

7 November 2007 Matchday 4	Steaua București (Romania)	0–2	(Spain) Sevilla	București, Romania
21:45			25', 65' Renato	Stadium: Steaua; Attendance: 11,027; Referee: Herbert Fandel (Germany)

27 November 2007 Matchday 5	Steaua București (Romania)	1–1	(Czech Republic) Slavia Prague	București, Romania
21:45	Badea 12'		78' Šenkeřík	Stadium: Steaua; Attendance: 11,000; Referee: Alain Hamer (Luxembourg)

12 December 2007 Matchday 6	Arsenal (England)	2–1	(Romania) Steaua București	London, England
19:45	Diaby 8'; Bendtner 42'		68' Zaharia	Stadium: Emirates; Attendance: 59,786; Referee: Yuri Baskakov (Russia)

== Staff ==
=== Management ===
- Manager: Gheorghe Hagi (resigned), Massimo Pedrazzini (sacked), Marius Lăcătuș
- Assistant managers: Mihai Teja, Ioan Nagy, Massimo Pedrazzini
- Goalkeeping coach: Andrei Speriatu
- Fitness Coach: Horea Codorean
- Medic: Radu Paligora
- Masseur: Cătălin Fandel

=== Administration ===
- President: Valeriu Argăseală
- Vicepresident: Iulian Ghiorghișor
- Scouting manager: Mario Branco
- Marketing director: Andreea Chiriloiu
- Press Officer: Cătălin Făiniși
- Team Manager: Marius Ianuli
- Sporting Director: Adrian Ilie

=== Board Room ===
- Chairman: George Becali
- Vice-Chairman: Teia Sponte
- Board Room Members: Lucian Becali, Vasile Geambazi
- Censor: Victor Manole, Mariana Istudor
- Supplementary Censors: Virgil Laurențiu Găman, Maria Apostoiu
- Stock Holders: Vasile Geambazi (37%), Constantin Geambazi (30%), Cătălin Ciubotă (26%), Tomaida Bădescu (4%), Marius Ianuli (3%) (Note: It is assumed though that, given George Becali's influence over the club, these stock holders have been elected by Becali himself as trustworthy people.)

=== Youth Centre staff ===
- General manager: Leonard Strizu
- Coordinator: Gigel Gheorghe
- Physiotherapist: George Mărculescu
- Fitness Coach: Ciprian Prună
