= Nicolae Dică =

Romanian football manager (born 1980)

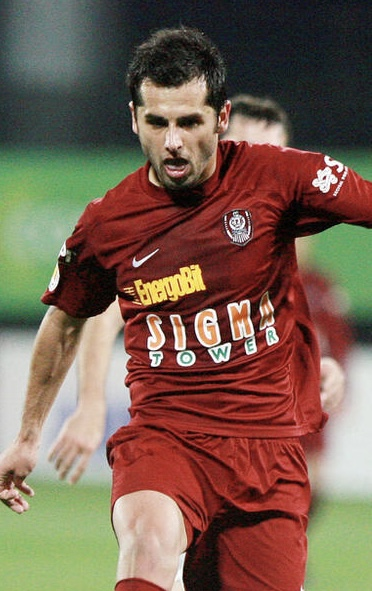
- Dică with CFR Cluj in 2010

Personal information
- Full name: Nicolae Constantin Dică
- Date of birth: 9 May 1980 (age 46)
- Place of birth: Pitești, Romania
- Height: 1.81 m (5 ft 11 in)
- Positions: Attacking midfielder; forward

Youth career
- 1991–1998: Argeș Pitești

Senior career*
| Years | Team | Apps | (Gls) |
| 1998–2003 | Argeș Pitești | 88 | (34) |
| 1998–2000 | → Dacia Pitești (loan) | 50 | (19) |
| 2004–2008 | Steaua București | 125 | (54) |
| 2008–2011 | Catania | 3 | (0) |
| 2009 | → Iraklis (loan) | 13 | (3) |
| 2010 | → CFR Cluj (loan) | 13 | (0) |
| 2010 | → Manisaspor (loan) | 5 | (0) |
| 2011 | → Steaua București (loan) | 11 | (4) |
| 2011 | Mioveni | 15 | (1) |
| 2012–2014 | Viitorul Constanța | 69 | (19) |
| Total | | 392 | (134) |

International career
| 2000–2001 | Romania U21 | 5 | (0) |
| 2003–2010 | Romania | 32 | (9) |

Managerial career
- 2014–2015: Steaua București (assistant)
- 2015: Steaua București (caretaker)
- 2015–2017: SCM Pitești
- 2017–2018: FCSB
- 2019: Argeș Pitești
- 2019–2021: Romania (assistant)
- 2022: FCSB
- 2023: Mioveni
- 2023: FC U Craiova
- 2024: Voluntari
- 2024: Argeş Piteşti
- 2025: Concordia Chiajna
- * Club domestic league appearances and goals

Nicolae Constantin Dică (Romanian pronunciation: [nikoˈla.e konstanˈtin ˈdikə]; born 9 May 1980) is a Romanian professional football manager and former player.

Deployed as an attacking midfielder or a forward, Dică was known for his incisive passing, long balls and spectacular finishes. He played professionally in four countries, but spent most of his career in his native Romania representing Dacia Mioveni, Argeș Pitești, Steaua București, CFR Cluj and Viitorul Constanța. He was a Romanian international for seven years, and was selected for the UEFA Euro 2008.

Since his retirement as a player, Dică has had several stints as either an assistant, a caretaker or a head coach at his former club Steaua București. He also managed Argeș Pitești and was an assistant at the Romania national team.

== Club career ==
=== Dacia Pitești ===
Dică started playing professional football when he was 18 years old at a local team Dacia Pitești.

In his first season, Dică played in 17 games and scored 5 times for Dacia. In the second, he became a first team player and had a very good season, with Dacia finishing fourth in the Divizia B. He was one of the top scorers in the league that season with 14 goals.

=== Argeș Pitești ===
Dică was seen as an upcoming talent and the local Divizia A club, Argeș Pitești, signed him in 2000. He made his debut for Argeș Pitești in a 2–1 win against Gaz Metan Mediaș. He was soon awarded the captain's armband after the transfers of Adrian Mutu to Dinamo București and Adrian Neaga to Steaua București.

=== Steaua București ===
Romanian giants Steaua București paid €250,000 to sign him from Argeș Pitești in December 2003. He was transferred to Steaua after the recommendation of Victor Pițurcă and Mihai Stoica.

He made his debut in Europe in the 2004–05 UEFA Cup season, when Steaua eliminated previous winners Valencia, en route to the Round of 16, where they were knocked out by another Spanish side Villarreal.

In 2005 after Dică lost the chance to play in the UEFA Champions League, due to Steaua being eliminated by Rosenborg BK, he had another successful season in the UEFA Cup. The Bucharest club defeated the likes of Lens, Heereenven, Real Betis and their Romanian rivals Rapid București, on their way to the UEFA CUP semi-final, where they were eliminated by English Premier League club, Middlesbrough.

On 13 September 2006, Dică scored twice in the 4–1 away win against Dynamo Kyiv in Steaua București's opening game in the UEFA Champions League, this being his first ever appearance in said tournament. He went on to score four goals and add one assist in six games against group opponents, Dynamo Kyiv, Real Madrid, and Lyon. After his performances in the Champions League, the daily newspaper Gazeta Sporturilor gave the Romanian Footballer of the Year 2006 award to Dică.

On 23 January 2007, he suffered a knee injury while playing in a friendly against AC Siena, and missed most of the season. On 9 May, for his birthday, Dică returned to the team and was introduced in the late stages of the 2–0 victory against Ceahlăul Piatra Neamț. This was his first official game in 2007.

=== Catania ===
On 28 June 2008, Dică moved to Catania, mainly due to the desire of his former Steaua coach, Walter Zenga. He was expected to replace midfielder Juan Manuel Vargas who moved to ACF Fiorentina, but ended up being a flop, taking part in just 93 minutes of play during his first six months with Palermo. Although it seemed almost certain that he would leave during the January transfer market, coach Walter Zenga kept him at Catania until the end of the Serie A season.

In June 2009, Iraklis signed Dică on loan from Calcio Catania. He made his competitive debut on 23 August 2009 and scored twice in a 2–1 win over Panthrakikos.

In January 2010, CFR Cluj signed the midfielder on loan from Catania until June 2010. He won the Liga I and the Romanian Cup with them, scoring his first goal in a 2–1 victory against Dinamo București in the second leg of the Cup semi-final.

In July 2010, Manisaspor signed the midfielder on loan from Catania until June 2011. He rarely made it to the first team and then, on 14 December 2010, he agreed to cancel his contract with Manisaspor.

=== Later years ===
In January 2011, Dică signed a one-year contract with his former team, Steaua București. He made his debut for the club, on 27 February 2011, in a 1–0 win at Universitatea Craiova. On 5 April, he scored his first goal after his return to Steaua in a 5–0 home win over Unirea Urziceni. On 11 May, Dică scored the equalizer against AS Brașov, which sent Steaua through to the Romanian Cup final. On 25 May, Dică scored from a trademark free kick in a 2–1 victory over rivals Dinamo București, and won his second consecutive Romanian cup.

In May 2011, Dică joined Liga I side Dacia Mioveni. He received the number 80 jersey. On 31 October, Dică scored a goal in a 3–1 defeat to Concordia Chiajna. In January 2012, after fifteen games for the Liga I squad, he terminated his contract with Mioveni.

Later that month he signed a one-and-a-half-year contract with Liga II side Viitorul Constanța. At the end of the 2011–12 season, Viitorul earned promotion to the Liga I, in part due to Dică's performances, who scored six goals in the second half of the season.

== International career ==
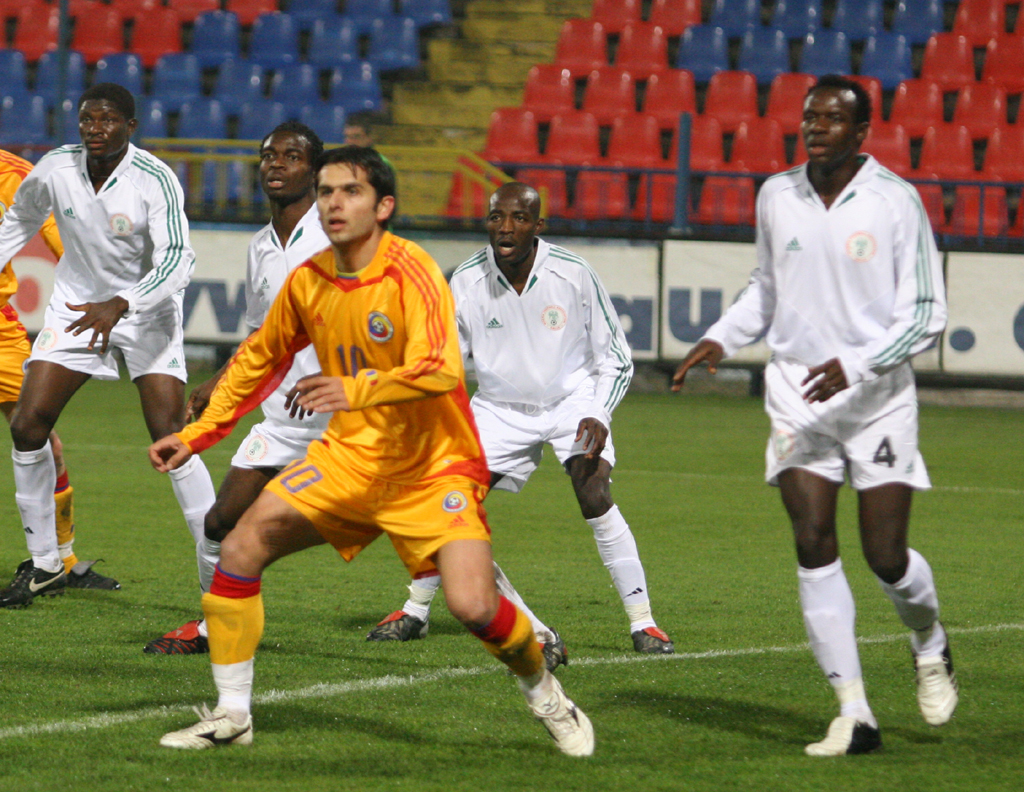
Dică playing against the Nigeria national team

On 11 October 2003, Dică made his debut for the Romania national team in a friendly game against Japan. He scored his first goal in August 2006, in a friendly game against Cyprus and amassed a total of 32 appearances for Romania.

== Managerial career ==
On 15 May 2017, it was announced that Nicolae Dică will be the manager of FCSB for the 2017–18 season. He went undefeated in his first ten games in all competitions before losing to Portuguese club Sporting CP, in the 2017–18 Champions League play-off. In December 2018, after a year and a half at the helm of the club, Dică terminated his contract with FCSB by mutual consent.

On 26 July 2022, Dică returned to FCSB. On 1 November 2022, Dică terminated his contract with FCSB by mutual consent.

On 14 January 2023, he was presented as the new manager of his former club Mioveni. He left the team by mutual consent on 26 April 2023.

On 17 July that year, he took charge of another Liga I side FC U Craiova. After two losses in the opening games of the season, he recorded two wins, before suffering a 4–3 defeat to Petrolul Ploiești on 18 August. The following day, only 34 days into his tenure, he was dismissed from the club.

== Personal life ==
In November 2003, Dică married Corina Zimbroianu, after the two met in 1998. He has a son, Marco Ilie, who was baptized by his former Steaua teammate, Mirel Radoi.

In March 2007, he had a difficult period in his life as his father died due to cirrhosis. Dică was under treatment at the Isokinetic clinic, in Bologna, when he heard the news. His father was the one who encouraged him to become a footballer.

== Playing statistics ==
=== Club ===
Appearances and goals by club, season and competition
| Club | Season | League | | | National cup (Note: Includes Cupa României, Coppa Italia, Turkish Cup) | | Europe | | Other | | Total | |
| Club | Season | Division | Apps | Goals | Apps | Goals | Apps | Goals | Apps | Goals | Apps | Goals |
|---|---|---|---|---|---|---|---|---|---|---|---|---|
| Dacia Pitești (loan) | 1998–99 | Divizia B | 17 | 5 | | | — | | — | | 17 | 5 |
| Dacia Pitești (loan) | 1999–00 | Divizia B | 33 | 14 | | | — | | — | | 33 | 14 |
| Dacia Pitești (loan) | Total | | 50 | 19 | | | 0 | 0 | — | | 50 | 19 |
| Argeș Pitești | 2000–01 | Divizia A | 19 | 4 | 1 | 0 | — | | — | | 20 | 4 |
| Argeș Pitești | 2001–02 | Divizia A | 27 | 11 | 2 | 1 | — | | — | | 29 | 12 |
| Argeș Pitești | 2002–03 | Divizia A | 28 | 10 | 5 | 0 | — | | — | | 33 | 10 |
| Argeș Pitești | 2003–04 | Divizia A | 14 | 8 | 3 | 2 | — | | — | | 17 | 10 |
| Argeș Pitești | Total | | 88 | 34 | 11 | 3 | 0 | 0 | — | | 99 | 37 |
| Steaua București | 2003–04 | Divizia A | 14 | 9 | — | | — | | — | | 14 | 9 |
| Steaua București | 2004–05 | Divizia A | 29 | 11 | 0 | 0 | 11 (Note: Appearances in UEFA Cup) | 2 | — | | 40 | 13 |
| Steaua București | 2005–06 | Divizia A | 29 | 15 | 1 | 0 | 15 (Note: Two appearances in UEFA Champions League, thirteen appearances and six goals in UEFA Cup) | 6 | 1 (Note: Appearance in Supercupa României) | 1 | 46 | 21 |
| Steaua București | 2006–07 | Liga I | 23 | 10 | 0 | 0 | 10 (Note: Appearances in UEFA Champions League) | 5 | 0 | 0 | 33 | 15 |
| Steaua București | 2007–08 | Liga I | 30 | 9 | 0 | 0 | 10 | 1 | — | | 40 | 10 |
| Steaua București | Total | | 125 | 54 | 1 | 0 | 46 | 14 | 1 | 1 | 173 | 69 |
| Catania | 2008–09 | Serie A | 3 | 0 | 3 | 1 | — | | — | | 6 | 1 |
| Iraklis (loan) | 2009–10 | Super League Greece | 13 | 3 | 0 | 0 | — | | — | | 13 | 3 |
| CFR Cluj (loan) | 2009–10 | Liga I | 13 | 0 | 3 | 1 | — | | — | | 16 | 1 |
| Manisaspor (loan) | 2010–11 | Süper Lig | 5 | 0 | 2 | 1 | — | | — | | 7 | 1 |
| Steaua București (loan) | 2010–11 | Liga I | 11 | 4 | 2 | 2 | — | | — | | 13 | 6 |
| Mioveni | 2011–12 | Liga I | 15 | 1 | 0 | 0 | — | | — | | 15 | 1 |
| Viitorul Constanța | 2011–12 | Liga II | 13 | 6 | — | | — | | — | | 13 | 6 |
| Viitorul Constanța | 2012–13 | Liga I | 26 | 10 | 0 | 0 | — | | — | | 26 | 10 |
| Viitorul Constanța | 2013–14 | Liga I | 30 | 3 | 1 | 0 | — | | — | | 31 | 3 |
| Viitorul Constanța | Total | | 69 | 19 | 1 | 0 | 0 | 0 | — | | 70 | 19 |
| Career total | | | 392 | 134 | 23 | 8 | 46 | 14 | 1 | 1 | 462 | 157 |

=== International ===
Appearances and goals by national team and year
| National team | Year | Apps | Goals |
|---|---|---|---|
| Romania | 2003 | 2 | 0 |
| Romania | 2004 | 7 | 0 |
| Romania | 2005 | 3 | 0 |
| Romania | 2006 | 5 | 2 |
| Romania | 2007 | 5 | 4 |
| Romania | 2008 | 8 | 3 |
| Romania | 2009 | 0 | 0 |
| Romania | 2010 | 2 | 0 |
| Total | | 32 | 9 |

Scores and results list Romania's goal tally first, score column indicates score after each Dică goal.

List of international goals scored by Nicolae Dică
| No. | Date | Venue | Opponent | Score | Result | Competition |
|---|---|---|---|---|---|---|
| 1 | 16 August 2006 | Stadionul Farul, Constanța, Romania | Cyprus | 1–0 | 2–0 | Friendly |
| 2 | 6 September 2006 | Qemal Stafa, Tirana, Albania | Albania | 1–0 | 2–0 | UEFA Euro 2008 qualifying |
| 3 | 22 August 2007 | Stadionul Lia Manoliu, Bucharest, Romania | Turkey | 1–0 | 2–0 | Friendly |
| 4 | 8 September 2007 | Dinamo Stadium, Minsk, Belarus | Belarus | 2–1 | 3–1 | UEFA Euro 2008 qualifying |
| 5 | 21 November 2007 | Stadionul Lia Manoliu, Bucharest, Romania | Albania | 1–0 | 6–1 | UEFA Euro 2008 qualifying |
| 6 | 21 November 2007 | Stadionul Lia Manoliu, Bucharest, Romania | Albania | 6–1 | 6–1 | UEFA Euro 2008 qualifying |
| 7 | 31 May 2008 | Stadionul Steaua, Bucharest, Romania | Montenegro | 3–0 | 4–0 | Friendly |
| 8 | 31 May 2008 | Stadionul Steaua, Bucharest, Romania | Montenegro | 4–0 | 4–0 | Friendly |
| 9 | 20 August 2008 | Stadionul Tineretului, Urziceni, Romania | Latvia | 1–0 | 1–0 | Friendly |

== Managerial statistics ==
As of 20 September 2025

| Team | From | To | Record | | | | | | | |
| Team | From | To | G | W | D | L | GF | GA | GD | Win % |
|---|---|---|---|---|---|---|---|---|---|---|
| Steaua București (caretaker) | 1 December 2015 | 3 December 2015 | 1 | 0 | 1 | 0 | 1 | 1 | +0 | 0.00 |
| SCM Pitești | 29 December 2015 | 31 May 2017 | 44 | 36 | 6 | 2 | 114 | 28 | +86 | 81.82 |
| FCSB | 1 June 2017 | 23 December 2018 | 80 | 46 | 18 | 16 | 146 | 79 | +67 | 57.50 |
| Argeș Pitești | 6 June 2019 | 7 October 2019 | 10 | 4 | 1 | 5 | 12 | 15 | −3 | 40.00 |
| FCSB | 26 July 2022 | 1 November 2022 | 23 | 9 | 7 | 7 | 34 | 39 | −5 | 39.13 |
| Mioveni | 14 January 2023 | 26 April 2023 | 15 | 3 | 4 | 8 | 11 | 23 | −12 | 20.00 |
| FC U Craiova | 17 July 2023 | 19 August 2023 | 5 | 2 | 0 | 3 | 10 | 10 | +0 | 40.00 |
| Voluntari | 31 January 2024 | 12 March 2024 | 7 | 0 | 3 | 4 | 3 | 10 | −7 | 0.00 |
| Argeș Pitești | 4 June 2024 | 21 September 2024 | 9 | 4 | 3 | 2 | 10 | 6 | +4 | 44.44 |
| Concordia Chiajna | 19 March 2025 | 22 September 2025 | 15 | 7 | 2 | 6 | 33 | 20 | +13 | 46.67 |
| Total | | | 209 | 111 | 45 | 53 | 373 | 231 | +142 | 53.11 |

== Honours ==
=== Player ===
Steaua București

- Divizia A: 2004–05, 2005–06
- Cupa României: 2010–11
- Supercupa României: 2006

CFR Cluj

- Liga I: 2009–10
- Cupa României: 2009–10

Individual

- Romanian Footballer of the Year: 2006

=== Coach ===
SCM Pitești

- Liga III: 2016–17
