= 2006 Supercupa României =

- Event: 2006 Supercupa României
Steaua București	Rapid București
Divizia A	Cupa României
1	0
- Date: 22 July 2006
- Venue: Stadionul Naţional, Bucharest
- Man of the Match: (Romania) Daniel Opriţa
- Referee: Alexandru Tudor (Romania)

The 2006 Supercupa României was the 9th edition of Romania's season opener cup competition. The match was played in Bucharest at Stadionul Naţional on 22 July 2006, and was contested between Divizia A title holders, Steaua and Cupa României champions, Rapid. Steaua won the trophy after a late goal by Daniel Opriţa.

== Match ==
=== Details ===
22 July 2006
21:00 EEST

Steaua București	1–0	Rapid București
Opriţa 90'	Report

Stadionul Naţional, Bucharest
Referee: Alexandru Tudor (Romania)

Steaua București	Rapid București

STEAUA BUCUREŞTI:
GK	13	(Angola) Carlos
RB	5	(Romania) Daniel Bălan
CB	17	(Romania) Eugen Baciu
CB	24	(Romania) Sorin Ghionea (c)	(yellow card) 38'
LB	15	(Romania) Mihai Neşu	(yellow card) 51'
RW	7	(Romania) Daniel Opriţa	(yellow card) 91'
CM	14	(Romania) Vasilică Cristocea
DM	20	(Romania) Florin Lovin
CM	28	(Romania) Gigel Coman	(yellow card) 30'	(substituted off) 34'
FW	9	(Romania) Valentin Badea	(yellow card) 7'	(substituted off) 90'
LW	30	(Romania) Răzvan Ochiroşii	(yellow card) 5'	(substituted off) 63'
Substitutes:
GK	12	(Romania) Cornel Cernea
DF	4	(Romania) Bogdan Panait
DF	18	(Romania) Petre Marin
AM	10	(Romania) Nicolae Dică
MF	16	(Romania) Bănel Nicoliţă		(substituted in) 63'
MF	22	(Romania) Sorin Paraschiv		(substituted in) 34'
FW	19	(Romania) Victoraş Iacob		(substituted in) 90'
Manager:
(Romania) Cosmin Olăroiu

RAPID BUCUREŞTI:
GK	32	(Romania) Mihai Mincă
DF	28	(Romania) Nicolae Constantin	(yellow card) 84'
DF	14	(Romania) Dănuț Perjă (c)
DF	19	(Romania) Cristian Săpunaru	(yellow card) 28'
DF	9	(Romania) Valentin Bădoi
MF	18	(Romania) Nicolae Grigore		(substituted off) 64'
MF	13	(Romania) Emil Dică
MF	10	(Armenia) Artavazd Karamyan		(substituted off) 78'
FW	29	(Romania) Mugurel Buga	(yellow card) 38'
FW	20	(Romania) Lucian Burdujan
FW	11	(Australia) Ryan Griffiths	(yellow card) 38'	(substituted off) 88'
Substitutes:
GK	30	(Romania) Andrei Marinescu
DF	5	(Romania) Ionuţ Stancu		(substituted in) 78'
MF	8	(Romania) Valentin Negru		(substituted in) 64'
MF	7	(Romania) Ciprian Vasilache
MF	21	(Romania) Ianis Zicu		(substituted in) 88'
FW	16	(Romania) Andrei Petrescu
	––
Manager:
(Romania) Răzvan Lucescu

MATCH OFFICIALS

- Assistant referees:
  - Cornel Fecioru
  - Adrian Vidan
- Fourth official:
  - Vasile Bratu

MAN OF THE MATCH

- (Romania) Daniel Opriţa

MATCH RULES

- 90 minutes.
- 30 minutes extra-time (15 minute intervals)
- Penalty shoot-out if scores level after extra time.
- Seven named substitutes
- Maximum of 3 substitutions.

== See also ==
- Derbiul Bucureștiului
- 2006–07 Liga I
- 2006–07 Cupa României
