= Bănel Nicoliță =

Romanian footballer

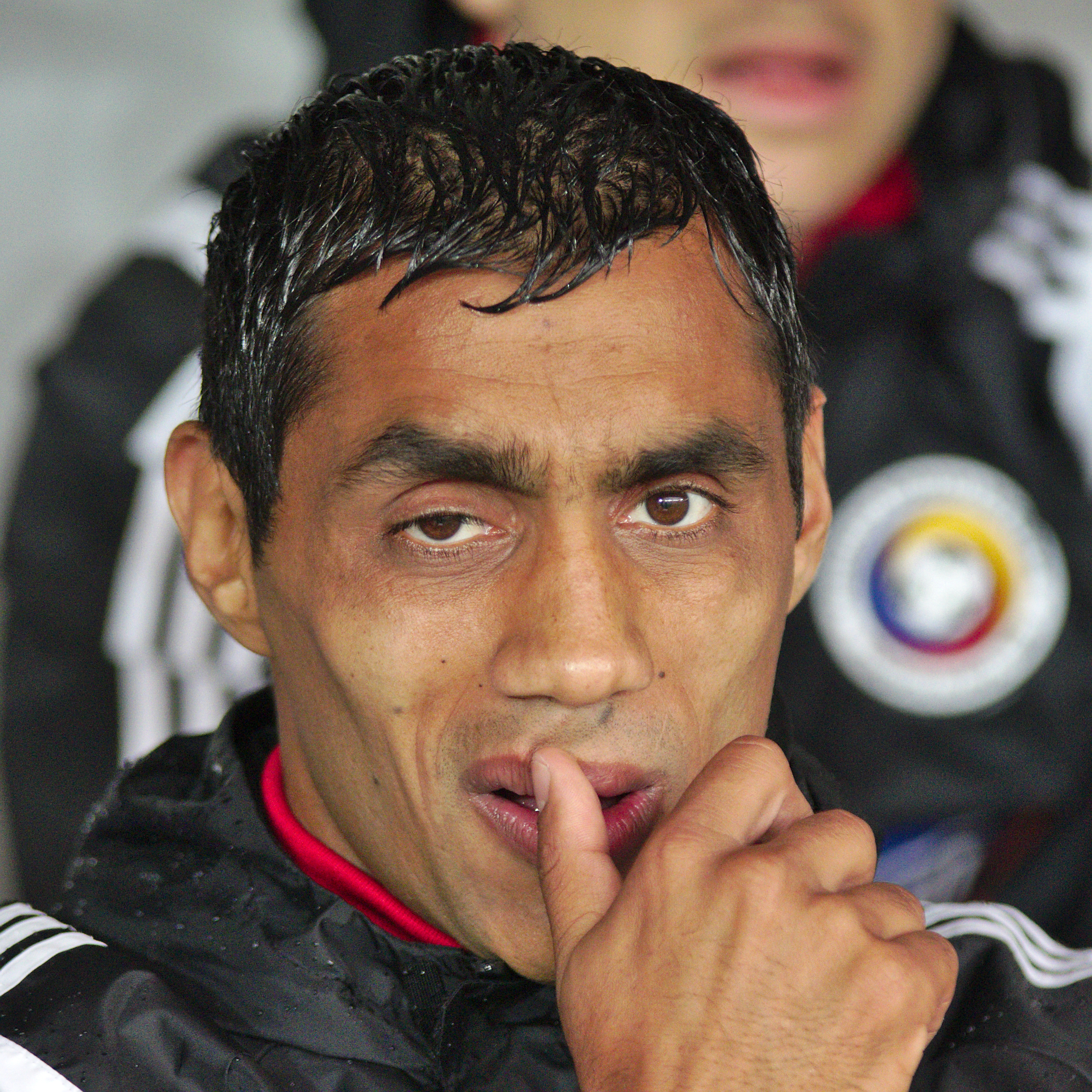
- Nicoliță in 2014

Personal information
- Date of birth: 7 January 1985 (age 41)
- Place of birth: Făurei, Romania
- Height: 1.75 m (5 ft 9 in)
- Positions: Right winger; wing-back

Youth career
- 1992–1993: Unirea Făurei
- 1993–2001: Dacia Unirea Brăila

Senior career*
| Years | Team | Apps | (Gls) |
| 2001–2004 | Dacia Unirea Brăila | 77 | (23) |
| 2004 | Poli AEK Timișoara | 15 | (3) |
| 2005–2011 | Steaua București | 188 | (23) |
| 2011–2014 | Saint-Étienne | 25 | (3) |
| 2013–2014 | → Nantes (loan) | 17 | (1) |
| 2015–2016 | Viitorul Constanța | 37 | (6) |
| 2016–2017 | Făurei | 14 | (10) |
| 2017 | ASA Târgu Mureș | 19 | (2) |
| 2017–2018 | Aris Limassol | 12 | (0) |
| 2018–2022 | Făurei | 94 | (50) |
| 2024 | Amara | | |
| 2024–2025 | Teleajenul Vălenii de Munte | | |
| 2026 | Produleşti | | |
| Total | | 498 | (118) |

International career
| 2003 | Romania U19 | 5 | (1) |
| 2003–2005 | Romania U21 | 13 | (1) |
| 2005–2014 | Romania | 37 | (1) |

Managerial career
- 2016–2017: Făurei (player/coach)
- 2018–2022: Făurei (player/coach)
- * Club domestic league appearances and goals

Bănel Nicoliță (born 7 January 1985) is a Romanian former professional footballer who played as a right winger or a wing-back.

== Club career ==
=== Dacia Unirea Brăila and Poli AEK Timișoara ===
He made his debut in Romanian Divizia B, playing for Dacia Unirea Brăila. After, he joined Poli AEK Timișoara, making his Divizia A debut at the age of 19. However, he made only 15 league appearances for the club before moving to Steaua București, at the beginning of 2005, he signed a 5-year contract with Steaua.

=== Steaua București ===
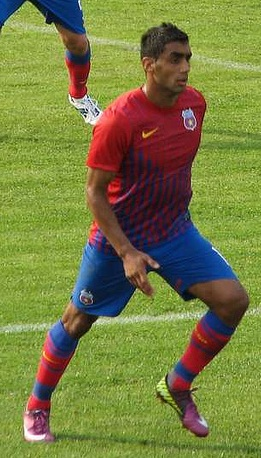
Nicoliță playing for FCSB in 2011

Shortly after joining Steaua, Nicoliță won his first Divizia A title upon his first season with the team. He is known to be a humble and hard-working player. Although not very technical, his strengths include speed and quickness. Interestingly, on the video game PES 6, his skill set as a player matched all his commonly agreed upon strengths (including being humble), but he was also graced with technical ability and was able to play very effectively as a box to box midfielder with very tidy feet.

In the spring of 2006, he scored twice in the match against Real Betis, his goals opening Steaua's door to the quarterfinals of the UEFA Cup, and then he scored again in the quarterfinals, this time against Rapid București to help his team reach the semifinals.

On 1 November 2006, he scored an own goal against Real Madrid in a Champions League encounter. Unfortunately for him and the Romanian side, this turned out to be decisive in the outcome of the match. He claimed he couldn't sleep for 48 hours after scoring it. After a game with FC Argeș, Romanian newspaper Gazeta Sporturilor named him Bănelinho.

On 27 August 2008, he has scored one goal in the match against Galatasaray, in the third qualifying round of UEFA Champions League, which sent Steaua to the group stage for the third consecutive year.

Starting with the 2010–11 season, Bănel was the new captain of Steaua București, but with the arrival of new coach Ilie Dumitrescu, he soon gave his armband to Cristian Tănase.

=== Saint-Étienne ===
On 30 August 2011, Saint-Étienne announced on their official website that they had reached an agreement with Steaua for Nicoliță's transfer and that the player would fly to France and undergo a medical the following day. Being in his last year of contract with Steaua București the transfer fee was €700.000. He signed a contract worth €400.000 per year.

On 6 November he scored his first goal helping Saint-Étienne draw against second place Montpellier. In a game against Sochaux Nicoliță offered the assist for teenager Zouma to give Saint-Étienne the win. After only six months with the French team he became a leader scoring 3 goals and offering 3 assists after his first 11 appearances. In February 2012 Nicoliță hit a rough patch, having a couple of not so convincing games, being described as monotonous. In March, he was sidelined for a couple of weeks, due to ligament problems. He recovered in late March 2012 and played in the games against Montpellier and Olympique Lyonnais, both 1–0 defeats.

==== Loan to Nantes ====
On 2 September 2013, Ligue 1 club FC Nantes confirmed Nicoliță was signed on a season-long loan from Saint-Étienne. He made an assist for his first match against FC Sochaux.

== International career ==
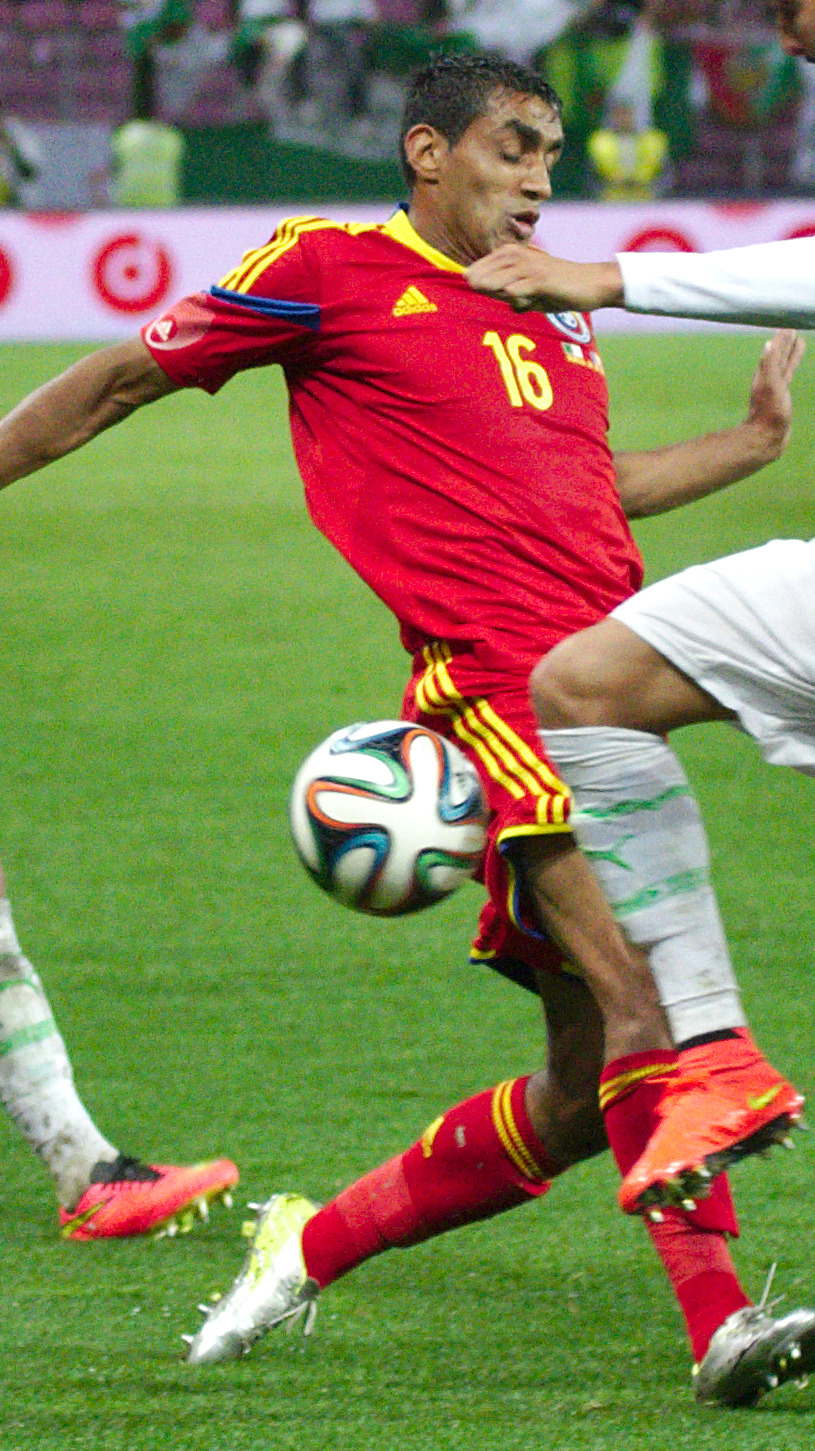
Nicoliță with Romania in 2014

Nicoliță earned 37 caps for Romania up to date and scored one goal. He also used to be a Romanian U21 international.

On 2 June 2007, Nicoliță scored his debut goal for Romania in a match against Slovenia. On 25 March 2008, he was decorated by the president of Romania, Traian Băsescu for the results on Qualifying to EURO 2008 and qualification to UEFA Euro 2008 Group C with Medalia "Meritul Sportiv" — (The Medal "The Sportive Merit") class II with two barret.

He was captain for the first time in the friendly against San Marino on 11 August 2011.

== Personal life ==
Nicoliță is an ethnic Romani, and one of six brothers raised by his mother in the small, impoverished town of Făurei. Nicoliță grew up determined to succeed and his speed and diligence on the field are proof of his unalloyed passion for the game.

One of his brothers, Stelian is also a professional footballer who played for CF Brăila and other teams in the lower leagues of Romania. Bănel and Stelian played together at their hometown team CS Făurei.

Nicoliță has been nicknamed "Jardel" after famous Brazilian player Mário Jardel.

== Career statistics ==
=== Club ===
Appearances and goals by club, season and competition
| Club | Season | League | | | National cup (Note: Includes Cupa României, Coupe de France) | | Europe | | Other | | Total | |
| Club | Season | Division | Apps | Goals | Apps | Goals | Apps | Goals | Apps | Goals | Apps | Goals |
|---|---|---|---|---|---|---|---|---|---|---|---|---|
| Dacia Unirea Brăila | 2001–02 | Divizia B | 28 | 4 | 0 | 0 | — | | — | | 28 | 4 |
| Dacia Unirea Brăila | 2002–03 | Divizia B | 28 | 9 | 0 | 0 | — | | — | | 28 | 9 |
| Dacia Unirea Brăila | 2003–04 | Divizia B | 21 | 10 | 0 | 0 | — | | — | | 21 | 10 |
| Dacia Unirea Brăila | Total | | 77 | 23 | 0 | 0 | — | | — | | 77 | 23 |
| Poli AEK Timișoara | 2004–05 | Divizia A | 15 | 3 | 1 | 0 | — | | — | | 16 | 3 |
| Steaua București | 2004–05 | Divizia A | 14 | 2 | — | | 1 (Note: Appearances in UEFA Cup) | 0 | — | | 15 | 2 |
| Steaua București | 2005–06 | Divizia A | 29 | 7 | 0 | 0 | 17 (Note: Four appearances and one goal in UEFA Champions League, thirteen appearances and three goals in UEFA Cup) | 4 | 1 (Note: Appearance in Supercupa României) | 0 | 47 | 11 |
| Steaua București | 2006–07 | Liga I | 32 | 2 | 4 | 1 | 12 (Note: Ten appearances in UEFA Champions League, two appearances in UEFA Cup) | 0 | 1 | 0 | 49 | 3 |
| Steaua București | 2007–08 | Liga I | 27 | 3 | 0 | 0 | 8 (Note: Appearances in UEFA Champions League) | 1 | — | | 35 | 4 |
| Steaua București | 2008–09 | Liga I | 26 | 3 | 0 | 0 | 7 | 2 | — | | 33 | 5 |
| Steaua București | 2009–10 | Liga I | 28 | 2 | 1 | 0 | 11 (Note: Appearances in UEFA Europa League) | 3 | — | | 40 | 5 |
| Steaua București | 2010–11 | Liga I | 27 | 4 | 2 | 1 | 6 | 0 | — | | 35 | 5 |
| Steaua București | 2011–12 | Liga I | 5 | 0 | — | | 2 | 0 | 1 | 0 | 8 | 0 |
| Steaua București | Total | | 188 | 23 | 7 | 1 | 64 | 10 | 3 | 0 | 262 | 34 |
| Saint-Étienne | 2011–12 | Ligue 1 | 19 | 3 | 1 | 0 | — | | 0 | 0 | 20 | 3 |
| Saint-Étienne | 2012–13 | Ligue 1 | 3 | 0 | 0 | 0 | — | | 0 | 0 | 3 | 0 |
| Saint-Étienne | 2013–14 | Ligue 1 | 3 | 0 | — | | 2 | 1 | — | | 5 | 1 |
| Saint-Étienne | Total | | 25 | 3 | 1 | 0 | 2 | 1 | — | | 28 | 4 |
| Nantes (loan) | 2013–14 | Ligue 1 | 17 | 1 | 1 | 0 | — | | 2 (Note: Appearances in Coupe de la Ligue) | 0 | 20 | 1 |
| Viitorul Constanța | 2014–15 | Liga I | 15 | 2 | — | | — | | — | | 15 | 2 |
| Viitorul Constanța | 2015–16 | Liga I | 22 | 4 | 3 | 0 | — | | 2 (Note: Appearances in Cupa Ligii) | 0 | 27 | 4 |
| Viitorul Constanța | Total | | 37 | 6 | 3 | 0 | — | | 2 | 0 | 42 | 6 |
| Făurei | 2016–17 | Liga IV | 14 | 10 | — | | — | | — | | 14 | 10 |
| ASA Târgu Mureș | 2016–17 | Liga I | 19 | 2 | — | | — | | 0 | 0 | 19 | 2 |
| Aris Limassol | 2017–18 | Cypriot First Division | 12 | 0 | 0 | 0 | — | | — | | 12 | 0 |
| Făurei | 2017–18 | Liga IV | ? | ? | — | | — | | — | | ? | ? |
| Făurei | 2018–19 | Liga III | ? | ? | ? | ? | — | | — | | ? | ? |
| Făurei | 2019–20 | Liga III | ? | ? | ? | ? | — | | — | | ? | ? |
| Făurei | 2020–21 | Liga III | ? | ? | ? | ? | — | | — | | ? | ? |
| Făurei | 2021–22 | Liga III | ? | ? | ? | ? | — | | — | | ? | ? |
| Făurei | Total | | 94 | 50 | 2 | 0 | — | | — | | 96 | 50 |
| Amara | 2023–24 | Liga IV | ? | ? | — | | — | | — | | ? | ? |
| Teleajenul Vălenii de Munte | 2024–25 | Liga IV | ? | ? | — | | — | | — | | ? | ? |
| Produlești | 2025–26 | Liga V | ? | ? | — | | — | | — | | ? | ? |
| Career total | | | 498 | 118 | 15 | 1 | 66 | 11 | 7 | 0 | 586 | 130 |

=== International ===
Appearances and goals by national team and year
| National team | Year | Apps | Goals |
|---|---|---|---|
| Romania | 2005 | 2 | 0 |
| Romania | 2006 | 6 | 0 |
| Romania | 2007 | 9 | 1 |
| Romania | 2008 | 8 | 0 |
| Romania | 2009 | 3 | 0 |
| Romania | 2010 | 2 | 0 |
| Romania | 2011 | 4 | 0 |
| Romania | 2012 | 0 | 0 |
| Romania | 2013 | 1 | 0 |
| Romania | 2014 | 2 | 0 |
| Total | | 37 | 1 |

Scores and results list Romania's goal tally first, score column indicates score after each Nicoliță goal.

| Goal | Date | Venue | Opponent | Score | Result | Competition |
|---|---|---|---|---|---|---|
| 1 | 2 June 2007 | Arena Petrol, Celje, Slovenia | Slovenia | 2–0 | 2–1 | UEFA Euro 2008 Qualifying |

== Honours ==
=== Player ===
Steaua București

- Divizia A: 2004–05, 2005–06
- Cupa României: 2010–11
- Supercupa României: 2006

Saint-Étienne

- Coupe de la Ligue: 2012–13

Făurei

- Liga IV – Brăila County: 2017–18

Teleajenul Vălenii de Munte

- Liga IV – Prahova County: 2024–25

=== Coach ===
Făurei

- Liga IV – Brăila County: 2017–18
