= Dino Eze =

Nigerian former football player

Personal information
- Date of birth: June 1, 1984 (age 42)
- Place of birth: Port Harcourt, Nigeria
- Height: 1.82 m (6 ft 0 in)
- Position: Midfielder

Senior career*
Years	Team	Apps	(Gls)
2004–2006	Beroe Stara Zagora	16	(2)
2006	Lokomotiv Plovdiv	7	(0)
2006	Dinamo București	0	(0)
2006	UTA Arad	0	(0)
2007–2008	Gloria Buzău	18	(1)
2008	Steaua București	0	(0)
2008	→ Gloria Buzău (loan)	14	(0)
2008–2009	Gloria Buzău	11	(0)
2009	Chimia Brazi		
2009–2010	UTA Arad	10	(0)
2010	CSMS Iași	3	(0)
2011	Ahly Tripoli		
2011–2012	Prahova Tomşani		
2012	Farul Constanța	7	(0)
2012–2015	Voltigeurs de Châteaubriant		
2015–2016	Gloria Buzău	2	(0)
2023–	CSM Adjud	0	(0)
Total		88	(3)
- * Club domestic league appearances and goals as of 26 February 2016

Dino Eze (born 1 June 1984, in Port Harcourt) is a Nigerian former footballer who played as a midfielder.
