= Sorin Ghionea =

Romanian footballer

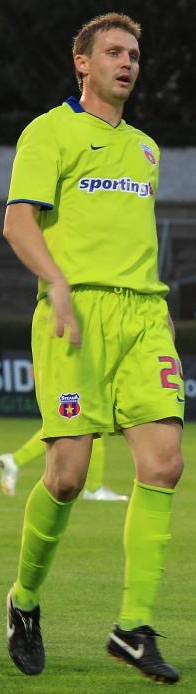
- Ghionea playing for Steaua in 2009

Personal information
- Date of birth: 11 May 1979 (age 47)
- Place of birth: Galaţi, Romania
- Height: 1.87 m (6 ft 2 in)
- Position: Centre-back

Youth career
- 1991–1993: Oțelul Galați
- 1995–1997: Oțelul Galați

Senior career*
Years	Team	Apps	(Gls)
1997–2002	Oțelul Galați	62	(2)
1997–1998	→ Dunărea Galaţi (loan)	15	(0)
2002–2009	Steaua București	130	(2)
2003	→ Farul Constanța (loan)	0	(0)
2003–2004	→ Oțelul Galați (loan)	26	(0)
2010	Rostov	18	(0)
2011	Politehnica Timișoara	15	(0)
2011–2012	FCM Târgu Mureş	21	(0)
2012–2013	Concordia Chiajna	27	(3)
2013	Viitorul Constanța	5	(0)
Total		319	(7)

International career
2000–2002	Romania U21	6	(0)
2002–2008	Romania	13	(1)
- * Club domestic league appearances and goals

Sorin Ghionea (born 11 May 1979) is a Romanian former professional footballer who played as a centre-back.

== Club career ==
=== Oțelul Galați ===
At the age of 12, Ghionea was sent to Oțelul Galați football club by his teacher, Tică Ploieșteanu. The second day he was hand-picked by the coach and played there for 2 years. After that he studied hard at school and left football until the 10th grade when he went back to the youth team of Oțelul Galați. At first he played as a full left back, but then he moved into the center of defense.

=== Dunărea Galați ===
Ghionea made his debut as a player for Dunărea Galaţi during the 1997–98 season and helped his team avoid relegation in Liga III. Just one year later, he joined Oțelul Galați. He debuted in Divizia A on 7 August 1998 in the win against FC Național.

He played for Oțelul between 1998 and 2003 62 matches and scoring two goals. He also was loaned by Steaua to Oțelul Galați in the 2004–05 season in Liga I.

=== Steaua București ===
In 2002, Ghionea moved to Steaua București for free transfer, but he did not convince Victor Piturca, Steaua's manager at that time, playing only in 6 matches and then being loaned back to Oțelul Galați. He played as a captain for Oțelul on his loaned season in most of the matches and he had excellent performances.

In 2004, the ex-president of Oțelul Galați, now manager of Steaua București, Mihai Stoica, took him back to the team from Bucharest. When he returned to Steaua, Victor Piţurcă left to coach the Romania national football team and Walter Zenga became Steaua's new manager.

In September 2004, Ghionea went through an operation on his nose after the match against FK Voždovac. To protect his nose, he played wearing a mask and he was nicknamed "Zorro". He became close to Dorin Goian a basic player for Steaua București especially after he took Mirel Rădoi's place in the central defense after he was injured for a couple of time. When Rădoi returned to the first team he was put to play in the midfield and Ghionea kept his place.

With Steaua București he played 53 games in two seasons and succeeded to win two consecutive champion titles in 2005 and 2006.

In the European Cups he debuted with Steaua in UEFA Cup in the season 2004–05 which was very good for them because they succeeded to qualify in the European Spring after more than 10 years. Steaua passed from a group with Standard Liège, Sampdoria, Besiktas Istanbul and Athletic Bilbao and also eliminated after this the ex-winner of UEFA Cup, Valencia.

The next season in UEFA Cup was even better because Steaua played in the semi-finals after defeated teams like Lens, Heerenveen, Real Betis and in the quarter-finals Rapid București, one of their traditional Romanian rivals. In the semi-final was eliminated by Middlesbrough after two fantastic games.

He scored his first goal for Steaua against Dynamo Kyiv, in the UEFA Champions League group stage. After a corner kick served by Vasilică Cristocea, Ghionea placed a header on the right post and in the back of the net.

On 25 February 2007, Ghionea suffered an injury in Steaua – UTA Arad, match ended with a draw. His situation got worse and he was forced to have surgery on his left knee in April 2007. After 4 months from the injury, Ghionea started his training on the pitch, closely supervised by medic Radu Paligora. Even though it was said that Ghionea would not miss the start of Liga I 2007–08 season on 28 July, his knee was not fully recovered and he did not play in any match for Steaua. In October 2007 there were rumors that Ghionea would no longer play football, but coach Massimo Pedrazzini said that the information was not true and Ghionea was still recovering. On 13 October 2007 the center back went through another surgery to check the natural causes of his injury and to estimate the period that he would be unavailable.

On 18 January 2008, he played his first game since his injury, after 11 months, a friendly match against Wisła Kraków that ended 0–0. He played in almost all of the season's remaining matches.

On 10 July 2008, Steaua București rejected a €1.5m bid from Serie A side Catania but Ghionea decided to remain at the club for the foreseeable future.

=== Rostov ===
On 20 January 2010, Steaua announced that Ghionea was sold to FC Rostov. The Romanian centre-back signed until June 2013. He made his debut in a 0–2 defeat to Tom Tomsk on 13 March 2010. After spending a season in the Russian Premier League Ghionea, decided to terminate his contract with Rostov on 7 February 2011.

=== Politehnica Timișoara ===
On 9 February 2011, Ghionea signed an initial six-month contract with Poli, with the option to extend it for another two years. Ghionea made his home debut for Politehnica Timișoara in 3–1 win against Gaz Metan Mediaş on 26 February 2011. Although Poli finished second at the end of the 2010–11 Liga I season and was supposed to play in the 2011–12 UEFA Champions League, however, the club was relegated to the second division because of accumulated debt and Ghionea left Poli on 19 July.

=== FCM Târgu Mureș ===
On 19 July 2011, he signed a two-year deal with Liga I side FCM Târgu Mureş.

== International career ==
Ghionea made his international debut for Romania on 27 March 2002 in a friendly against Ukraine, and his international career got off to a winning start with a 4–1 victory for Romania. Since then Ghionea has won nine further caps for Romania. He was sent off in Romania's second 2010 FIFA World Cup qualification match against the Faroe Islands in which Romania won 1–0.

== Career statistics ==
Appearances and goals by national team and year
National team	Year	Apps	Goals
Romania	2002	1	0
Romania	2003	0	0
Romania	2004	4	0
Romania	2005	1	0
Romania	2006	2	0
Romania	2007	1	0
Romania	2008	4	1
Total		13	1

Scores and results list Romania's goal tally first, score column indicates score after each Ghionea goal.

#	Date	Venue	Opponent	Score	Result	Competition
1	31 May 2008	Stadionul Steaua, Bucharest, Romania	Montenegro	2–0	4–0	Friendly

== Honours ==
Oțelul Galați

- Cupa României runner-up: 2003–04

Steaua București

- Divizia A: 2004–05, 2005–06
- Supercupa României: 2006
