= 2005–06 Divizia A =

88th season of top-tier football league in Romania

Divizia A
- Season: 2005–06
- Champions: Steaua București
- Relegated: Bacău; Sportul Studențesc București
- Champions League: Steaua București
- UEFA Cup: Rapid București; Dinamo București
- Intertoto Cup: Farul Constanța
- Matches: 240
- Goals: 553 (2.3 per match)
- Top goalscorer: Ionuț Mazilu (22)
- Biggest home win: Dinamo 6–0 Bacău
- Biggest away win: Argeș 0–5 Oțelul
- Highest scoring: Dinamo 4–5 Sportul
- Longest winning run: Sportul (6)
- Longest unbeaten run: Rapid (15)
- Longest losing run: Bacău (13)

The 2005–06 Divizia A was the eighty-eighth season of Divizia A, the top-level football league of Romania. The Season began in August 2005 and ended in June 2006. Steaua București became champions on 7 June, 2006.

== Team changes ==
=== Relegated ===
The teams that were relegated to the Divizia B at the end of the previous season:

- Apulum Alba Iulia
- Brașov
- Universitatea Craiova

=== Promoted ===
The teams that were promoted from the Divizia B at the beginning of the season:

- Vaslui
- Pandurii Târgu Jiu
- Jiul Petroșani

=== Venues ===
Politehnica Timișoara	Steaua București	Rapid București	FCM Bacău
Dan Păltinișanu	Steaua	Giulești-Valentin Stănescu	Municipal
Capacity: 32,972	Capacity: 28,365	Capacity: 19,100	Capacity: 17,500
Farul Constanța	Jiul Petroșani	Dinamo București	Argeș Pitești
Farul	Jiul	Dinamo	Nicolae Dobrin
Capacity: 15,520	Capacity: 15,500	Capacity: 15,032	Capacity: 15,000
Național București	2005–06 Divizia A (Romania) Location of Bucharest teams.		Oțelul Galați
Cotroceni	2005–06 Divizia A (Romania) Location of Bucharest teams.		Oțelul
Capacity: 14,542	2005–06 Divizia A (Romania) Location of Bucharest teams.		Capacity: 13,500
Politehnica Iași	2005–06 Divizia A (Romania) Location of Bucharest teams.		Sportul Studențesc
Emil Alexandrescu	2005–06 Divizia A (Romania) Location of Bucharest teams.		Regie
Capacity: 11,390	2005–06 Divizia A (Romania) Location of Bucharest teams.		Capacity: 10,020
CFR Cluj	FC Vaslui	Pandurii Târgu Jiu	Gloria Bistrița
CFR	Municipal	Tudor Vladimirescu	Gloria
Capacity: 10,000	Capacity: 9,240	Capacity: 9,200	Capacity: 7,800

=== Personnel and kits ===
Team	Head coach	Captain	Kit manufacturer	Shirt Sponsor
Argeș Pitești	(Romania) Vasile Stan	(Romania) Alin Chița	Erreà	Pic
CFR Cluj	(Romania) Dorinel Munteanu	(Romania) Vasile Jula	Erreà	EnergoBit, Opel Ecomax
Dinamo București	(Romania) Florin Marin	(Romania) Florentin Petre	Lotto	Omniasig
Farul Constanța	(Serbia) Momčilo Vukotić	(Romania) Ion Barbu	Lotto	SNC
FCM Bacău	(Romania) Cristian Popovici	(Romania) Daniel David	Erreà	Letea
Gloria Bistrița	(Romania) Ioan Sabău	(Romania) Sandu Negrean	Erreà	Rombat
Jiul Petroșani	(Romania) Aurel Șunda	(Romania) Cornel Mihart	Nike	Atomis
Național București	(Italy) Cristiano Bergodi	(Romania) Ovidiu Burcă	Nike	top birotic
Oțelul Galați	(Romania) Petre Grigoraș	(Romania) Viorel Tănase	Lotto	Mittal Steel
Pandurii Târgu Jiu	(Romania) Nicolae Ungureanu	(Romania) Cătălin Trofin	Lotto	USMO
Politehnica Iași	(Romania) Ionuț Popa	(Romania) Bogdan Onuț	Umbro	Iulius Mall
Politehnica Timișoara	(Romania) Iosif Rotariu	(Romania) Ovidiu Petre	Converse	Balkan Petroleum
Rapid București	(Romania) Răzvan Lucescu	(Romania) Vasile Maftei	Lotto	Lukoil
Sportul Studențesc	(Romania) Gheorghe Mulțescu	(Romania) Tiberiu Bălan	Lotto	—
Steaua București	(Romania) Cosmin Olăroiu	(Romania) Mirel Rădoi	Nike	RAFO
Vaslui	(Romania) Mircea Rednic	(Romania) Marius Croitoru	Umbro	Racova

== League table ==
Pos	Team	Pld	W	D	L	GF	GA	GD	Pts	Qualification or relegation
1	Steaua București (C)	30	19	7	4	49	16	+33	64	Qualification to Champions League second qualifying round
2	Rapid București	30	17	8	5	47	23	+24	59	Qualification to UEFA Cup first qualifying round
3	Dinamo București	30	17	5	8	56	32	+24	56 (Note: DIN 4-5 SPO; SPO 0-2 DIN)	Qualification to UEFA Cup first qualifying round
4	Sportul Studențesc București (R)	30	17	5	8	54	35	+19	55	Relegation to Liga II (Note: Sportul Studențesc was denied the right to participate for next season of Liga I because it failed to meet the licensing requirements, therefore Pandurii Lignitul Târgu Jiu (15th place) was spared from relegation.)
5	CFR Cluj	30	14	8	8	36	27	+9	50	
6	Național București	30	13	7	10	32	37	−5	46	
7	Farul Constanța	30	14	3	13	39	38	+1	45	Qualification to Intertoto Cup first round
8	Politehnica Timișoara	30	10	10	10	34	31	+3	40	
9	Oțelul Galați	30	10	9	11	35	37	−2	39 (Note: OȚE: 8 pts; GLO: 5 pts; POL: 2 pts)	
10	Gloria Bistrița	30	11	6	13	27	34	−7	39	
11	Politehnica Iași	30	11	6	13	28	31	−3	39	
12	Argeș Pitești	30	8	8	14	27	37	−10	32	
13	Jiul Petroșani	30	7	9	14	28	39	−11	30	
14	Vaslui	30	6	11	13	23	37	−14	29	
15	Pandurii Târgu Jiu	30	6	7	17	22	44	−22	25	Spared from relegation
16	Bacău (R)	30	3	5	22	16	55	−39	14	Relegation to Liga II

Source: LPF (in Romanian)
Rules for classification: 1) points; 2) head-to-head points; 3) head-to-head goal difference; 4) head-to-head goals scored; 5) goal difference; 6) number of goals scored.
(C) Champions; (R) Relegated

=== Positions by round ===
Team ╲ Round	1	2	3	4	5	6	7	8	9	10	11	12	13	14	15	16	17	18	19	20	21	22	23	24	25	26	27	28	29	30
Argeș Pitești	11	12	8	9	9	8	6	8	7	8	5	8	6	4	6	7	6	8	8	9	9	9	9	9	10	11	12	12	12	12
Bacău	12	7	11	6	8	11	11	11	11	13	14	14	14	14	14	14	15	15	15	15	15	16	16	16	16	16	16	16	16	16
CFR Cluj	8	11	5	7	4	4	3	4	5	6	3	3	4	6	5	5	7	5	4	5	6	6	5	5	5	5	6	7	5	5
Dinamo București	1	1	3	3	2	2	2	2	2	1	1	1	1	2	1	1	1	1	1	1	1	2	2	2	4	4	4	4	3	3
Farul Constanța	4	4	2	2	3	3	4	3	3	3	7	10	8	7	8	8	9	9	9	8	8	7	6	8	6	6	5	5	6	7
Gloria Bistrița	3	3	9	11	14	13	14	15	14	11	11	11	11	11	11	11	11	11	11	11	11	11	11	10	9	9	9	9	9	10
Jiul Petroșani	14	14	14	14	13	14	13	12	12	12	12	13	12	12	13	13	12	13	12	12	12	12	12	13	13	13	14	13	14	13
Oțelul Galați	15	8	12	12	12	12	12	14	13	14	15	15	15	15	15	15	14	12	13	14	13	13	13	12	12	12	11	10	10	9
Pandurii Târgu Jiu	10	15	16	16	16	16	15	13	15	15	13	12	13	13	12	12	13	14	14	13	14	14	15	15	15	15	15	15	15	15
Politehnica Iași	16	16	13	13	11	9	10	10	10	10	10	9	9	10	10	10	10	10	10	10	10	10	10	11	11	10	10	11	11	11
Național București	5	9	4	4	6	5	5	5	8	4	8	5	7	5	3	4	4	7	7	7	4	5	8	6	8	7	7	6	7	6
Rapid București	6	5	10	10	10	7	9	7	6	7	4	7	5	9	7	6	5	4	3	3	3	3	3	3	2	3	3	2	2	2
Sportul Studențesc București	9	10	6	5	5	6	7	6	4	5	9	6	10	8	9	9	8	6	5	4	5	4	4	4	3	2	2	3	4	4
Steaua București	7	2	1	1	1	1	1	1	1	2	2	2	2	1	2	2	2	2	2	2	2	1	1	1	1	1	1	1	1	1
Politehnica Timișoara	2	6	7	8	7	10	8	9	9	9	6	4	3	3	4	3	3	3	6	6	7	8	7	7	7	8	8	8	8	8
Vaslui	13	13	15	15	15	15	16	16	16	16	16	16	16	16	16	16	16	16	16	16	16	15	14	14	14	14	13	14	13	14

Source: LT (in Romanian)

=== Results ===
Home \ Away	ARG	BAC	CFR	DIN	FAR	GBI	JIU	OȚE	PAN	PIA	NAT	RAP	SPO	STE	TIM	VAS
Argeș Pitești	—	0–0	0–1	0–1	1–2	2–0	2–1	0–5	0–1	3–0	2–3	1–1	2–2	0–1	1–1	1–0
Bacău	3–2	—	0–2	0–1	1–1	1–2	1–2	0–4	1–0	0–1	2–2	0–1	1–2	0–2	1–0	0–2
CFR Cluj	2–2	4–0	—	1–0	3–0	0–0	0–0	0–1	1–2	0–0	0–0	1–3	0–0	1–0	2–0	1–0
Dinamo București	1–2	6–0	5–0	—	0–1	3–1	1–1	0–3	3–0	1–1	2–1	5–2	4–5	1–1	1–0	1–2
Farul Constanța	2–0	2–0	1–2	0–1	—	3–0	1–0	0–1	1–0	1–0	4–0	1–2	2–2	1–4	4–2	2–1
Gloria Bistrița	1–0	2–1	1–2	1–2	1–0	—	0–0	0–0	4–0	1–0	0–2	2–1	2–0	1–0	1–1	1–1
Jiul Petroșani	0–1	2–0	5–1	1–3	3–1	0–2	—	0–3	1–1	0–2	2–0	3–0	1–3	1–2	1–1	0–0
Oțelul Galați	0–1	0–0	0–1	1–4	0–1	1–0	0–0	—	1–1	0–0	2–0	3–3	2–3	0–3	0–2	1–1
Pandurii Târgu Jiu	1–0	2–1	0–1	0–2	1–2	2–1	1–1	2–2	—	0–1	1–1	0–0	0–1	1–2	3–2	0–0
Politehnica Iași	3–2	4–0	1–0	0–2	3–1	1–1	2–0	0–1	1–0	—	2–3	1–4	1–0	0–1	0–1	1–0
Național București	0–1	1–0	0–4	2–0	1–0	2–0	1–1	3–2	3–2	1–1	—	1–0	2–1	0–0	1–0	0–1
Rapid București	1–1	2–1	1–0	3–0	0–0	1–0	3–0	4–0	3–0	1–0	1–0	—	3–0	0–0	0–0	1–1
Sportul Studențesc București	1–0	2–1	1–1	0–2	3–1	2–1	4–0	4–0	4–0	2–1	0–1	1–0	—	1–2	3–1	3–0
Steaua București	0–0	1–0	2–0	2–2	3–0	0–1	1–0	4–0	1–0	1–0	4–0	0–2	4–1	—	2–1	2–2
Politehnica Timișoara	0–0	2–0	2–2	0–0	3–2	4–0	1–0	0–2	1–0	3–0	2–1	1–3	0–0	0–0	—	2–0
Vaslui	3–0	1–1	0–3	1–2	0–2	2–0	1–2	0–0	2–1	1–1	0–0	0–1	0–3	0–4	1–1	—

Source: LT (in Romanian)
Legend: Blue = home team win; Yellow = draw; Red = away team win.

== Attendances ==
Pos	Team	Total	High	Low	Average	Change
1	Politehnica Timișoara	220,000	32,000	3,000	14,666	−18.5%
2	Steaua București	130,000	25,000	0	8,666	−42.7%^{7,9}
3	FC Vaslui	122,500	10,000	4,000	8,166	n/a^{1}
4	Politehnica Iași	101,500	13,000	4,000	6,766	−22.5%
5	Jiul Petroșani	97,500	17,000	3,500	6,500	n/a^{1}
6	Rapid București	97,000	16,000	0	6,466	−18.5%^{11}
7	Pandurii Târgu Jiu	95,500	15,000	1,500	6,366	n/a^{1}
8	CFR Cluj	81,800	12,000	300	5,453	−19.8%^{5}
9	Dinamo București	74,500	12,000	0	4,966	−2.6%^{6,10}
10	Sportul Studențesc București	65,300	15,000	500	4,353	+40.7%
11	Oțelul Galați	64,400	16,000	400	4,293	+12.2%^{3}
12	Farul Constanța	50,500	13,000	200	3,366	−29.8%
13	Argeș Pitești	47,200	7,000	0	3,146	−35.3%^{2,8}
14	Gloria Bistrița	42,100	10,000	300	2,806	+40.3%^{4}
15	Național București	33,550	10,000	200	2,236	−16.1%
16	FCM Bacău	31,050	13,000	200	2,070	−18.6%
	League total	1,354,400	32,000	0	5,643	−14.0%

Updated to games played on 27 August 2019
Source: League matches: Divizia A 2005/2006
Notes:
1: Played last season in Divizia B.
2: Argeș Pitești played 13 matches out of their stadium.
3: Oțelul Galați played 8 matches out of their stadium.
4: Gloria Bistrița played 2 matches out of their stadium.
5: CFR Cluj played 3 matches out of their stadium.
6: Dinamo București played 1 match out of their stadium.
7: Steaua București played 8 matches out of their stadium.
8: Argeș Pitești played 1 game behind closed doors.
9: Steaua București played 4 games behind closed doors.
10: Dinamo București played 2 games behind closed doors.
11: Rapid București played 3 games behind closed doors.

== Top goalscorers ==
Rank	Player	Club	Goals
1	(Romania) Ionuț Mazilu	Sportul Studențesc	22
2	(Romania) Nicolae Dică	Steaua București	15
3	(Romania) Viorel Moldovan	Politehnica Timișoara / Rapid București	14
4	(Romania) Claudiu Niculescu	Dinamo București	12
4	(Romania) Tiberiu Bălan	Sportul Studențesc	12
6	(Romania) Ciprian Tănasă	Argeș Pitești	11
7	(Romania) Alexandru Bălțoi	Dinamo București / Oțelul Galați	10
7	(Romania) Ștefan Grigorie	Dinamo București	10
9	(Romania) Ionuț Bâlbă	Politehnica Iași	9
9	(Romania) Ianis Zicu	Dinamo București	9

== Champion squad ==
Steaua București

Goalkeepers: Carlos Fernandes (Angola) (13 / 0); Cornel Cernea (2 / 0); Vasil Khamutowski (Belarus) (15 / 0).
Defenders: Eugen Baciu (9 / 0); Daniel Bălan (6 / 0); Florentin Dumitru (7 / 0); Sorin Ghionea (26 / 0); Dorin Goian (23 / 2); Petre Marin (14 / 0); Mihai Neșu (19 / 0); George Ogăraru (28 / 1).
Midfielders: Gabriel Boștină (27 / 4); Florin Lovin (23 / 1); Bănel Nicoliță (29 / 7); Daniel Oprița (24 / 1); Sorin Paraschiv (26 / 3); Mirel Rădoi (24 / 4); Răzvan Ochiroșii (1 / 0).
Forwards: Andrei Cristea (24 / 3); Vasilică Cristocea (14 / 2); Nicolae Dică (29 / 15); Laurențiu Diniță (8 / 0); Victoraș Iacob (22 / 5).
(league appearances and goals listed in brackets)

Manager: Oleh Protasov (Ukraine) / Cosmin Olăroiu.

== See also ==
- 2005–06 in Romanian football
