= Valentin Simion =

Romanian footballer

Personal information
- Full name: Valentin Alexandru Simion
- Date of birth: 6 October 1986 (age 40)
- Place of birth: Bucharest, Romania
- Height: 1.83 m (6 ft 0 in)
- Position: Forward

Youth career
- 2002–2003: Steaua București

Senior career*
| Years | Team | Apps | (Gls) |
| 2003–2009 | Steaua București | 3 | (0) |
| 2004–2010 | Steaua II București^{1} | 21 | (6) |
| 2003–2004 | → Midia Năvodari (loan) | 2 | (0) |
| 2006–2007 | → UTA Arad (loan) | 28 | (3) |
| 2007–2008 | → Gloria Buzău (loan) | 26 | (1) |
| 2008–2009 | → Pandurii Târgu Jiu (loan) | 9 | (0) |
| 2010–2012 | Victoria Brăneşti | 37 | (8) |
| 2012–2013 | Concordia Chiajna | 12 | (0) |
| Total | | 138 | (18) |

International career
| 2007–2009 | Romania U21 | 7 | (1) |
- * Club domestic league appearances and goals as of 13 January 2013

Valentin Alexandru Simion (born 6 October 1986 in Bucharest, Romania) is a retired Romanian footballer.

He started his career at Steaua București. In 2009–10, Simion was demoted to the B squad. On 15 August 2009 Valentin Simion scored first goal in the history of Steaua II București in the Liga II.

== Honours ==
Steaua București

- Romanian Championship League: 2004–05

== Notes ==
^1 The 2004–2005 and 2005–2006 Liga III appearances and goals made for Steaua II București are unavailable.
