= Daniel Oprița =

Romanian footballer and manager

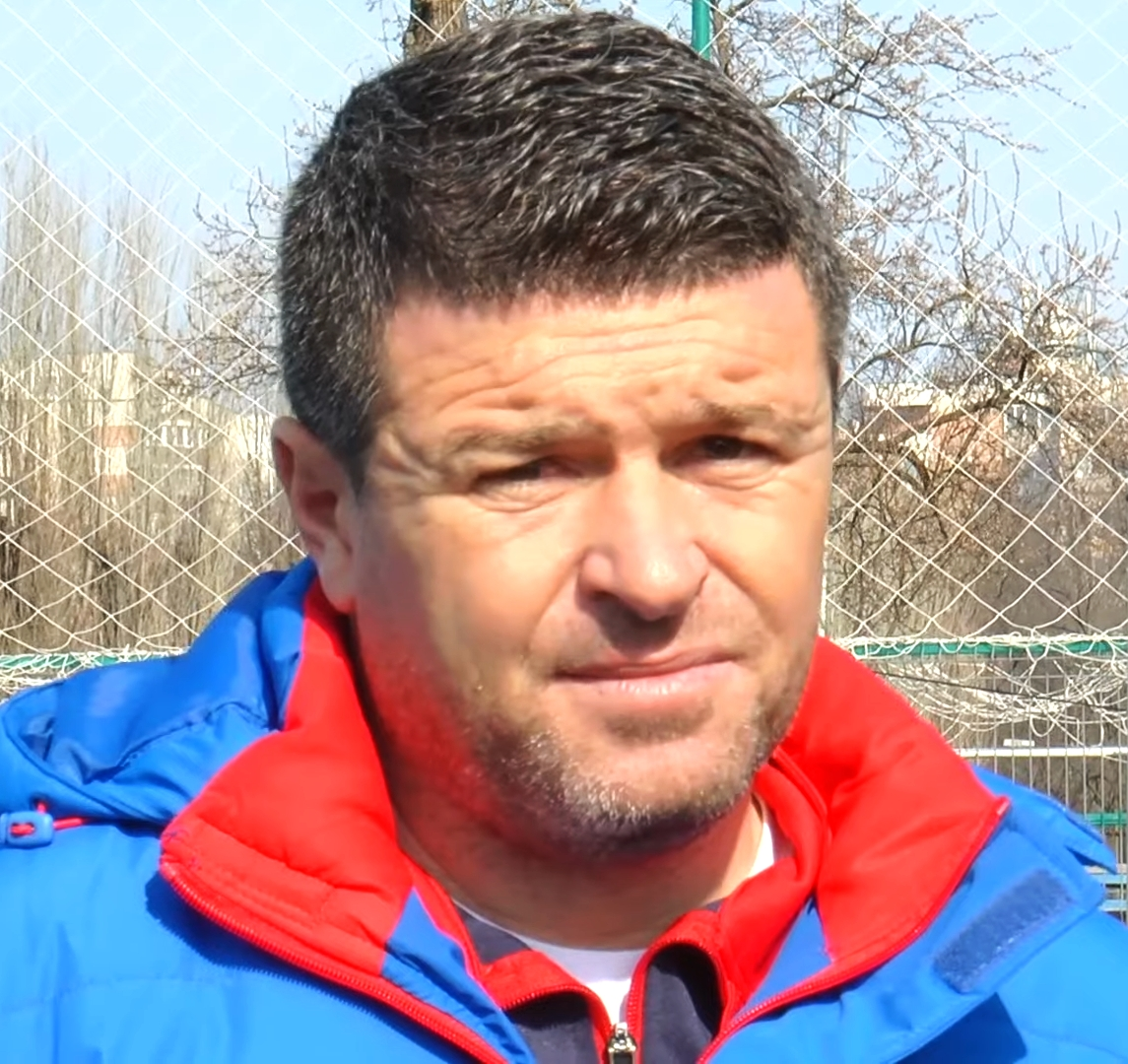
- Oprița in 2020

Personal information
- Full name: Daniel Ionel Oprița
- Date of birth: 10 August 1981 (age 45)
- Place of birth: Drăgănești-Olt, Romania
- Height: 1.84 m (6 ft 0 in)
- Positions: Winger; forward

Team information
- Current team: CSA Steaua București (head coach)

Youth career
- 1994–1995: CSȘ Caracal
- 1995–2000: Argeș Pitești

Senior career*
Years	Team	Apps	(Gls)
2000	Minerul Moldova Nouă		
2001–2002	CSM Reșița	33	(7)
2002–2007	Steaua București	107	(15)
2007–2008	Dinamo București	5	(0)
2008	→ UTA Arad (loan)	6	(0)
2008–2009	Lorca Deportiva	3	(0)
2009	→ Aarau (loan)	15	(0)
2009	Baku	3	(0)
2010–2013	Petrolul Ploiești	89	(26)
2013	Mordovia Saransk	11	(2)
2013–2014	Universitatea Craiova	8	(1)
2014	Metalul Reșița	13	(1)
Total		293	(52)

International career
2002	Romania U21	4	(1)
2003–2006	Romania	7	(1)

Managerial career
- 2014–2015: Metalul Reșița
- 2015: Steaua București (assistant)
- 2015–2017: Juventus București
- 2017–2018: CSMȘ Reşiţa
- 2018: Voluntari
- 2019: Mioveni
- 2019–: CSA Steaua București
- * Club domestic league appearances and goals

Daniel Ionel Oprița (born 10 August 1981) is a Romanian professional football manager and former player, currently in charge of Liga II club CSA Steaua București.

== Club career ==
Oprița began his career at Minerul Moldova Nouă in 2000 in Divizia C, the third tier of the Romanian football, being transferred to CSM Reșița in 2001 in Divizia B. In 2002, he moved on to Steaua București, making the step up to Divizia A. Oprița spent the next seven years of his career in Bucharest winning the Divizia A in 2004–05 and 2005–06 and also the Supercupa României in 2005–06. He scored 15 goals in 107 appearances whilst at Steaua București.

On 12 April 2007, he moved across Bucharest to play for city rivals Dinamo București on a four-year contract. His time at the club was not a success and he played just five games without scoring. Later, in 2008, he signed for UTA Arad.

After one season with the club, Oprița terminated his contract and moved to south-east Spain to play for Lorca Deportiva of the Segunda División B, the third tier of the Spanish football league system. Oprița failed to settle in Spain and returned to Romania after just one month and three games. Due to the transfer window being closed, he was unable to sign for a new team until the winter break. In January 2009, he signed a six-month loan contract with FC Aarau of the Swiss Super League.

== Style of play ==
Despite playing as a striker, Oprița did not score many goals, he was a more of a target man and his main ability was to create spaces for his teammates, where many goals were from. He was very committed while playing, and he was also technically gifted.

== International career ==
For Romania, Oprița was capped seven times and scoring one goal. He made his debut in 2003 against Ukraine.

== Career statistics ==
Appearances and goals by national team and year
National team	Year	Apps	Goals
Romania	2003	2	0
Romania	2004	0	0
Romania	2005	1	1
Romania	2006	4	0
Total		7	1

Scores and results list Romania's goal tally first, score column indicates score after each Oprița goal.

List of international goals scored by Daniel Oprița
No.	Date	Venue	Opponent	Score	Result	Competition
1	9 February 2005	Neo GSZ Stadium, Larnaca, Cyprus	Slovakia	2–2	2–2	Friendly

== Honours ==
=== Player ===
Steaua București

- Divizia A: 2004–05, 2005–06
- Supercupa României: 2006

Petrolul Ploiești

- Liga II: 2010–11

=== Coach ===
Juventus București

- Liga II: 2016–17
- Liga III: 2015–16

CSA Steaua București

- Liga III: 2020–21
- Liga IV – Bucharest: 2019–20
