= Mihai Stoica =

Romanian football manager

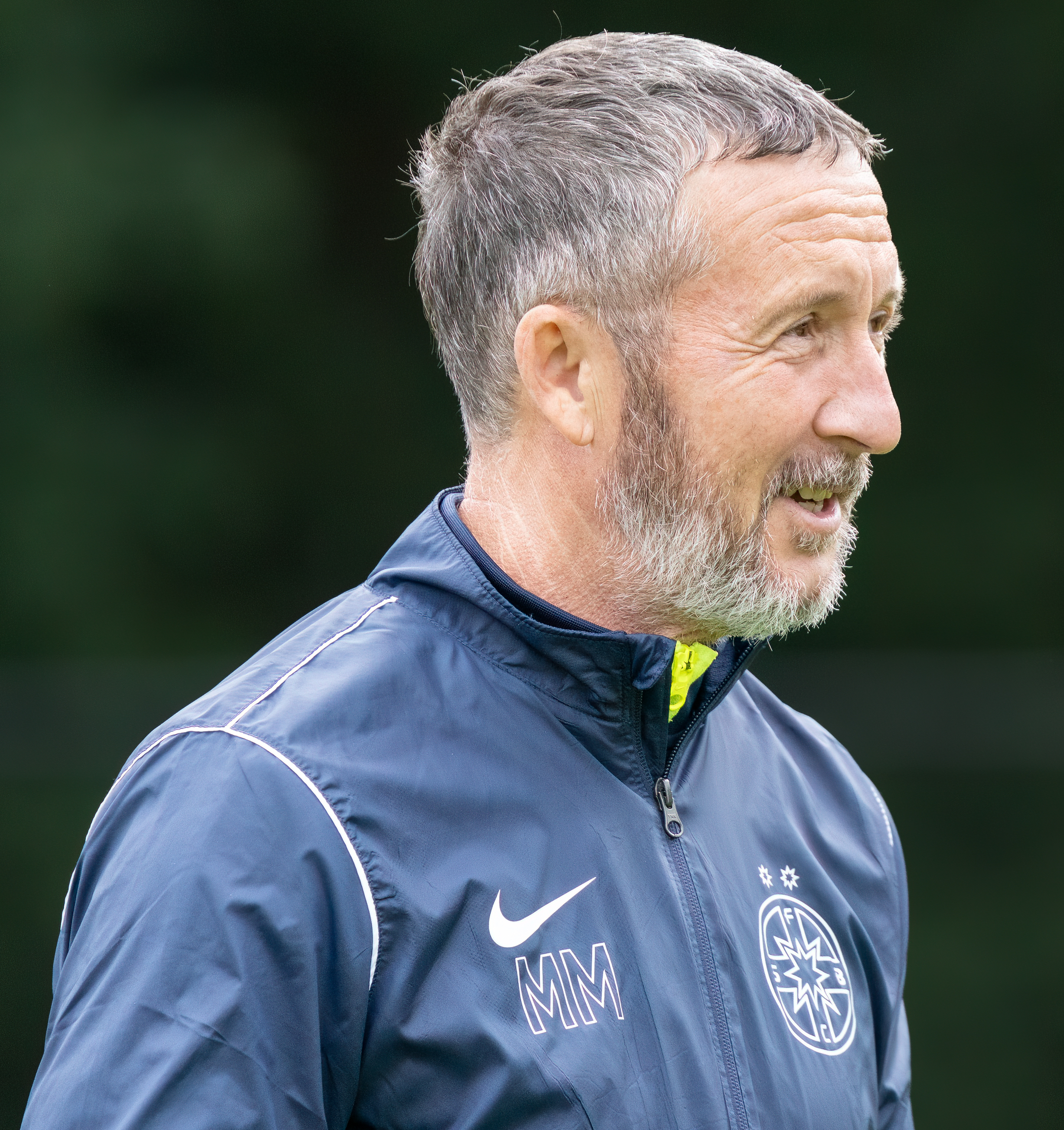
- Stoica in 2023
- Full name: Mihai Stoica
- Born: 12 April 1965 (age 61); Sibiu, Romania
- Other occupation: President; General manager

Domestic
Years	League	Role
1992–2002	Oțelul Galați	CEO
2004–2007	Steaua Bucureşti	President
2007–2010	Unirea Urziceni	President
2010–2011	Steaua Bucureşti	General Manager
2012–2014	Steaua Bucureşti	Manager
2016–2019	FCSB	Sporting director
2019–2021	FCSB	Sporting director
2021–2026	FCSB	General Manager

Mihai "Meme" Stoica (born 12 April 1965) is a Romanian football executive. He is the former president of Oțelul Galați and former general manager of Unirea Urziceni. Since November 2010 until September 2011, Stoica was the manager of Steaua Bucureşti. He was for a while the permanent co-host of some TV shows at DigiSport TV Channel. In 2012, he returned to Steaua as general manager. Currently, Stoica takes on the role of a sports analyst on the Prima Sport broadcast.

In March 2014, he was convicted by a Romanian appeals court to a jail term of 3 years and 6 months for money laundering and tax evasion in connection with the transfer of 12 Romanian players abroad.

== Footballer ==
- Oțelul Galați (1986–1987)
