= Vasilică Cristocea =

Romanian footballer

Personal information
- Date of birth: 27 July 1980 (age 46)
- Place of birth: Hârşova, Romania
- Height: 1.72 m (5 ft 7 1/2 in)
- Position: Midfielder

Youth career
- Carsium Hârşova

Senior career*
Years	Team	Apps	(Gls)
1999–2006	Farul Constanţa	156	(26)
2006–2008	Steaua București	46	(6)
2008–2009	Steaua II București	5	(0)
2008	→ Ceahlăul Piatra Neamţ	14	(0)
2009–2010	Farul Constanţa	23	(2)
2010–2013	Viitorul Constanţa	55	(10)
2013–2015	Universitatea Cluj	49	(2)
2015–2016	Farul Constanţa	14	(2)
Total		362	(48)

International career
	Romania U-21	1	(0)
- * Club domestic league appearances and goals as of 22 February 2016

Vasilică Cristocea (born 27 July 1980) is a Romanian former football player who played as a midfielder. He made 249 appearances in Liga I.

== Career ==
Cristocea made his debut playing for Carsium Hârşova's youth teams, before joining Farul Constanţa in 1999. He spent most of his career at Constanţa's team, playing 156 matches and scoring 26 goals until 2006, when he was transferred by Steaua București.

Together with Steaua București he won the 2005–06 Divizia A season and played several matches in UEFA Champions League and UEFA Cup. In 2008, he was loaned to Ceahlăul Piatra Neamţ.

In 2009, he returned to Farul Constanţa where he played for one season before moving to the other town's team, Viitorul Constanţa. He played three years for Viitorul and in July 2013 he joined the Liga I team, Universitatea Cluj.

== Honours ==
Steaua București

- Liga I: 2005–06
- Supercupa României: 2006
