= 2005 Cupa României final =

- Event: 2004–05 Cupa României
Dinamo București	Farul Constanța
Divizia A	Divizia A
1	0
- Date: 11 May 2005
- Venue: Stadionul Cotroceni, Bucharest
- Referee: Laurent Duhamel (France)
- Attendance: 15,000

The 2005 Cupa României final was the 67th final of Romania's most prestigious cup competition. The final was played at the Cotroceni Stadium in Bucharest on 11 May 2005 and was contested between Divizia A sides Dinamo București and Farul Constanța. Ștefan Grigorie scored the only goal of the match as Dinamo București won the match 1–0.

== Background ==
Dinamo București had won the Cupa României on 11 previous occasions, joint-second only to Steaua București and equal with Dinamo București. Their most recent win was in 2003–04.

Farul Constanța had never previously played in a Cupa României final.

== Route to the final ==
=== Dinamo București ===
Dinamo București began the competition in the round of 32. They faced Olimpia Satu Mare at the Daniel Prodan Stadium in Satu Mare on 13 October 2004. The match finished 1–1 after extra time and Dinamo București won 5–3 in a penalty shoot-out. In the round of 16, Dinamo București faced Gaz Metan Mediaș at Dinamo Stadium in Bucharest on 27 October 2004. They won 1–0 to progress to the two-legged quarter-finals. The first leg of the quarter-finals took place at Dinamo Stadium against Dacia Unirea Brăila on 10 November 2004 and Dinamo București won 1–0. They then won the second leg at Brăila Municipal Stadium in Brăila 2–0 (3–0 on aggregate) to advance to the semi-finals. The semi-finals were also played over two legs and Dinamo București lost the first leg 2–1 against Național București at the Cotroceni Stadium in Bucharest on 16 March 2005. However, they won the second leg at Dinamo Stadium on 13 April 2005 4–0 to advance to the final 5–2 on aggregate.

=== Farul Constanța ===
Farul Constanța defeated FCM Bacău II 2–0 in the round of 32 before winning 2–1 against CFR Cluj to advance to the quarter-finals. They defeated Oțelul Galați home and away, 4–1 on aggregate, to reach the semi-finals. After winning the first leg 1–0, they lost the second leg of their semi-final 2–1 against U Craiova (2–2 on aggregate) and advanced to the final on away goals.

Dinamo București
Round	Home team	Score	Away team
Round of 32	Olimpia Satu Mare	1–1 (aet, p. 2–5)	Dinamo București
Round of 16	Dinamo București	1–0	Gaz Metan Mediaș
Quarter-finals 1st Leg	Dinamo București	1–0	Dacia Unirea Brăila
Quarter-finals 2nd Leg	Dacia Unirea Brăila	0–2	Dinamo București
Semi-finals 1st Leg	FC Național București	2–1	Dinamo București
Semi-finals 2nd Leg	Dinamo București	4–0	Național București

Farul Constanța
Round	Home team	Score	Away team
Round of 32	FCM Bacău II	0–2	Farul Constanța
Round of 16	Farul Constanța	2–1	CFR Cluj
Quarter-finals 1st Leg	Oțelul Galați	1–2	Farul Constanța
Quarter-finals 2nd Leg	Farul Constanța	2–0	Oțelul Galați
Semi-finals 1st Leg	Farul Constanța	1–0	Universitatea Craiova
Semi-finals 2nd Leg	Universitatea Craiova	2–1	Farul Constanța

== Match details ==
11 May 2005
20:15 EEST

Dinamo București	1–0	Farul Constanța
Grigorie 6'

Stadionul Cotroceni, Bucharest
Attendance: 15,000
Referee: Laurent Duhamel (France)

Dinamo București	Farul Constanța

DINAMO BUCUREŞTI:
GK	1	(Romania) Bogdan Stelea
DF	15	(Romania) George Galamaz
DF	22	(Romania) Angelo Alistar
DF	30	(Romania) Gabriel Tamaș
MF	8	(Romania) Florentin Petre (c)		(substituted off) 75'
MF	6	(Romania) Andrei Mărgăritescu
MF	25	(Romania) Ovidiu Burcă	(yellow card) 53'	(substituted off) 56'
MF	29	(Romania) Cristian Pulhac
MF	10	(Romania) Ștefan Grigorie
FW	18	(Romania) Adrian Mihalcea	(yellow card) 42'	(substituted off) 70'
FW	9	(Romania) Claudiu Niculescu
Substitutes:
GK	12	(Belarus) Vladimir Gaev
DF	27	(Romania) Ionuț Bălan		(substituted in) 70'
DF	26	(Romania) Ştefan Radu
MF	20	(Romania) Adrian Cristea
MF	7	(Romania) Ianis Zicu		(substituted in) 56'
FW	17	(Romania) Alexandru Bălțoi		(substituted in) 75'
FW	19	(Romania) Tibor Moldovan
Manager:
(Romania) Ioan Andone

FARUL CONSTANŢA:
GK	1	(Romania) George Curcă
DF	7	(Romania) Răzvan Farmache
DF	6	(Romania) Ion Barbu (c)
DF	2	(Romania) Cristian Șchiopu
DF	3	(Romania) Cosmin Pașcovici	(yellow card) 65'	(substituted off) 75'
MF	4	(Romania) Florin Lungu	(yellow card) 67'
DF	5	(Romania) Adrian Senin
MF	8	(Romania) Dinu Todoran		(substituted off) 85'
FW	11	(Romania) Mihai Guriță
MF	10	(Romania) Vasilică Cristocea		(substituted off) 10'
FW	9	(Romania) Liviu Mihai
Substitutes:
GK	12	(Romania) Adrian Vlas
DF	13	(Romania) Laurențiu Florea		(substituted in) 85'
MF	14	(Romania) Iulian Apostol		(substituted in) 10'
MF	15	(Romania) Mihai Baicu		(substituted in) 75'
MF	16	(Romania) George Ușurelu
FW	17	(Romania) Radu Doicaru
FW	18	(Romania) Viorel Gheorghe
Manager:
(Romania) Petre Grigoraș

MATCH OFFICIALS

- Assistant referees:
  - (France) Patrick Reinbold
  - (France) Jean-Paul Chaudre
- Fourth official:
  - (France) Pascal Vileo

MAN OF THE MATCH

MATCH RULES

- 90 minutes.
- 30 minutes extra-time (15 minute intervals)
- Penalty shoot-out if scores level after extra time.
- Seven named substitutes
- Maximum of 3 substitutions.
