= Ionuț Bălan =

Romanian footballer

Personal information
- Date of birth: 2 March 1978 (age 48)
- Place of birth: Bucharest, Romania
- Height: 1.71 m (5 ft 7 in)
- Position: Right-back

Team information
- Current team: CS Dinamo București (assistant)

Youth career
- –1998: Dinamo București

Senior career*
Years	Team	Apps	(Gls)
1998–2000	ARO Câmpulung	84	(15)
2001–2002	FC Baia Mare	35	(3)
2002–2004	Farul Constanța	42	(1)
2004–2006	Dinamo București	23	(1)
2004–2006	Dinamo II București	26	(2)
2006–2008	UTA Arad	75	(0)
2009–2010	Unirea Alba Iulia	45	(2)
2010	Juventus București	12	(0)
2011–2012	UTA Arad	32	(0)
2012	Szeged	0	(0)
Total		337	(22)

Managerial career
- 2016–2026: Juniors Berceni (youth)
- 2026–: CS Dinamo București (assistant)
- * Club domestic league appearances and goals

Ionuț Bălan (born 2 March 1978) is a Romanian former professional footballer who played as a right-back, currently assistant coach at Liga II club CS Dinamo București.

== Career ==
Bălan was born on 2 March 1978 in Bucharest, Romania and began playing junior-level football at local club Dinamo where he was coached by Ionuț Chirilă. He started his senior career in 1998 at Divizia B club ARO Câmpulung. Midway through the 2000–01 season, he moved to FC Baia Mare. In 2002, Bălan joined Farul Constanța, making his Divizia A debut on 30 August 2002 under coach Viorel Hizo in a 1–0 victory against UTA Arad. On 19 October 2003, he scored his first goal in the competition in a 3–1 away win over Gloria Bistrița.

In 2004, Bălan went to play for Dinamo. He played three matches in the 2004–05 Champions League qualifying rounds, as they got past Žilina in the second round before they were defeated by Manchester United in the following round. Subsequently, he played in a 3–1 away loss to Partizan in the first round of the 2004–05 UEFA Cup. On 4 May 2005, he scored a goal from a 25-meter free kick in a 1–0 victory against Politehnica Timișoara. Dinamo reached the 2005 Cupa României final, where coach Ioan Andone sent Bălan to replace Adrian Mihalcea in the 70th minute of the 1–0 victory against Farul Constanța. Afterwards, he played two matches in the 2005–06 UEFA Cup campaign, including a 1–0 victory against title holders CSKA Moscow in the group stage.

In 2006, Bălan went to play for UTA Arad. The club suffered relegation at the end of the 2007–08 season, but he stayed with the team for another half a year. Afterwards, he joined Unirea Alba Iulia, helping the club gain promotion to the first league. However, the team was relegated back to the second league following the 2009–10 season. Bălan made his last Liga I appearance on 15 May 2010 in Unirea's 5–0 away loss to Gaz Metan Mediaș, totaling 153 matches with three goals in the competition. From 2010 to 2012, he played in the second league for Juventus București and UTA. Bălan ended his career one year later after playing for Szeged 2011.

== Honours ==
=== Player ===
Dinamo București

- Cupa României: 2004–05
- Supercupa României: 2005

Unirea Alba Iulia

- Liga II: 2008–09
