= Grigoraș =

Grigoraș (pronunciation: [ɡriɡoˈraʃ]) is a Romanian surname and given name. Notable people with the name include:

== Given name ==
- Grigoraș Dinicu (1889–1949), Romanian violin player and composer

== Surname ==
- Alexandru Grigoraș (born 1989), Romanian footballer
- Anca Grigoraș (born 1957), Romanian artistic gymnast
- Andrei Grigoraș (born 1989), Romanian futsal player
- Cristina Grigoraș (born 1990), Romanian rower
- Cristina Elena Grigoraş (born 1966), Romanian artistic gymnast
- Demis Grigoraș (born 1993), Romanian handball player
- Ioan Grigoraș (born 1963), Greco-Roman wrestler from Romania
- Petre Grigoraș (born 1964), Romanian football manager and former player
