= Adrian Cristea =

Romanian footballer (born 1983)

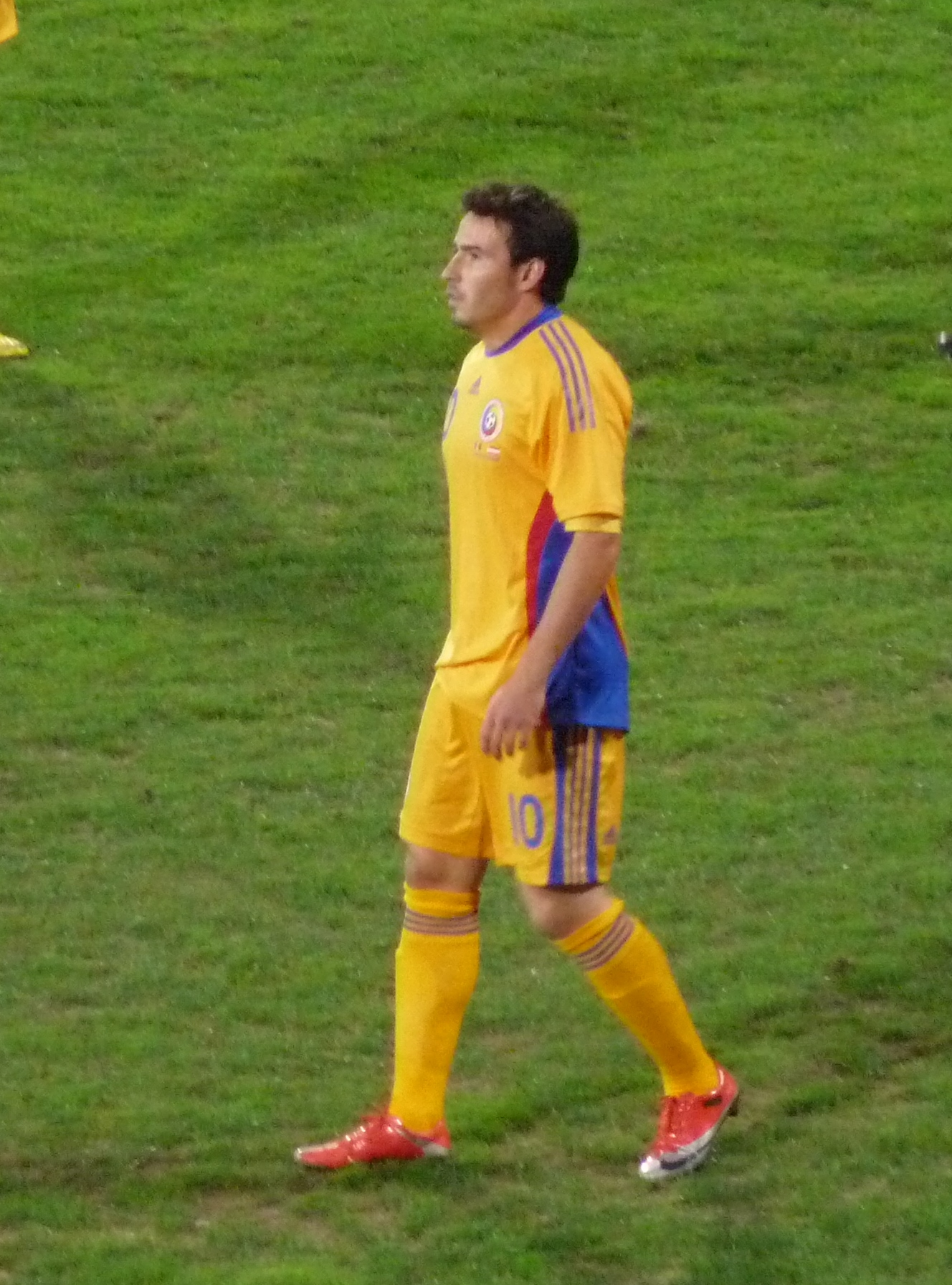
- Cristea playing for Romania

Personal information
- Date of birth: 30 November 1983 (age 42)
- Place of birth: Iași, Romania
- Height: 1.79 m (5 ft 10 in)
- Position: Winger

Youth career
- –2000: Politehnica Iași

Senior career*
Years	Team	Apps	(Gls)
2001–2004	Politehnica Iași	93	(18)
2005–2010	Dinamo București	161	(26)
2011–2012	Universitatea Cluj	42	(11)
2012–2013	Petrolul Ploiești	15	(1)
2013	→ Standard Liège (loan)	8	(0)
2013–2014	Steaua București	9	(1)
2014–2016	Concordia Chiajna	23	(1)
Total		351	(58)

International career
2003–2006	Romania U21	7	(0)
2007–2011	Romania	9	(0)
- * Club domestic league appearances and goals

Adrian Cristea (born 30 November 1983) is a Romanian former professional footballer who played as a winger.

== Club career ==
=== Politehnica Iași ===
Cristea, nicknamed "Prințul" (The Prince), was born on 30 November 1983 in Iași, Romania. He began playing football for his hometown club, Politehnica, in the Romanian lower leagues. After helping Politehnica get promoted from Divizia B, Cristea made his Divizia A debut under coach Vasile Simionaș on 30 July 2004 in a 2–1 loss to Rapid București. One week later he netted his first goal when he opened the score in the 2–1 loss to Apulum Alba Iulia. On 3 October he scored the only goal in a victory against Steaua București.

=== Dinamo București ===
After scoring two goals in 15 matches in the first half of the 2004–05 season, Cristea was transferred to Dinamo București where he was wanted by coach Ioan Andone. By the end of the season, he won the Cupa României but Andone did not use him in the final against Farul Constanța. Cristea started the following season by winning the Supercupa României but again without Andone playing him in the victory against Steaua București. The team also reached the 2005–06 UEFA Cup group stage where he played in three games, including a 1–0 victory against title holders CSKA Moscow.

He helped The Red Dogs win the 2006–07 title, scoring three goals in 28 matches under the guidance of coach Mircea Rednic. In the same season, Dinamo reached the UEFA Cup round of 32 where they were eliminated with 3–1 on aggregate by Benfica, Cristea scoring three goals in the campaign, including one in a 2–1 win over Beşiktaş in the group stage. Subsequently, Dinamo had the objective of reaching the 2007–08 Champions League group stage, with Cristea appearing in both legs of the third qualifying round against Lazio Roma, which was eventually lost with 4–2 on aggregate. On 1 November 2008, he equalized with a header, following a pass from Gabriel Torje for a 1–1 draw against rivals Steaua.

Cristea helped the club achieve what was dubbed "The wonder from Liberec" by winning the away game 3–0 against Slovan Liberec to force a penalty shoot-out after losing the first leg by the same score, ultimately qualifying for the 2009–10 Europa League group stage. On 17 October 2010, he scored a penalty goal in a 2–1 derby win over Steaua.

=== Universitatea Cluj ===
In December 2010, Cristea was transferred from Dinamo to Universitatea Cluj, for a total fee estimated by the Romanian press between €1.5 – 2 million. On 1 October 2011, he scored the first hat-trick of his career in Universitatea's 5–2 victory against Gaz Metan Mediaș. During one and a half years he netted 11 goals in 42 first-league matches for The Red Caps.

=== Petrolul Ploiești and Standard Liège ===
In the summer of 2012, he was transferred to Petrolul Ploiești, along with 11 other players from "U" Cluj, a move that occurred when the owner of the Cluj team left the club to take control of Petrolul. In November 2012, he scored his only goal for Petrolul in a 2–0 win against his former team, Universitatea Cluj.

His only experience abroad came in 2013, when he went to play in Belgium alongside fellow Romanian George Țucudean, being loaned by Petrolul to Standard Liège. He made his Belgian Pro League debut on 10 February 2013, as coach Mircea Rednic used him the entire match in Standard's 1–0 home loss to Mons.

=== Steaua București ===
On 30 July 2013, after terminating his contract with Petrolul Ploiești, Cristea signed a two-year contract with Steaua București. However, Cristea failed to win a place in the first team, being used by coach Laurențiu Reghecampf in only nine league matches in which he scored one goal as The Military Men won the title. He also played in both legs of the 2013–14 Champions League play-off where the team eliminated Legia Warsaw, reaching the group stage. There, he made one appearance when he was sent in the 73rd minute to replace Leandro Tatu in a 3–0 away loss to Schalke 04. He ended his contract with Steaua in April 2014.

=== Concordia Chiajna ===
In September 2014, Cristea reached an agreement with Concordia Chiajna. At Chiajna he made his last Liga I appearances, totaling of 266 games with 40 goals in the competition and 34 matches with four goals in European competitions.

== International career ==
Cristea played nine games for Romania, making his debut on 7 February 2007 when coach Victor Pițurcă introduced him at halftime to replace Ovidiu Petre in a 2–0 friendly victory against Moldova. He appeared in two victories against Luxembourg in the successful Euro 2008 qualifiers. Cristea was called by Pițurcă in the squad for the Euro 2008 final tournament, but did not get an opportunity to play. He played in a 1–1 draw against Austria and a 5–0 loss to Serbia during the 2010 World Cup qualifiers. Cristea's last appearance for the national team was in a 2–2 draw against Belarus in the Euro 2012 qualifiers.

On 25 March 2008, Cristea was decorated by the president of Romania, Traian Băsescu, for his performance in the Euro 2008 qualifiers, where Romania managed to qualify to the final tournament. He received Medalia "Meritul Sportiv" – ("The Sportive Merit" Medal) class III.

== After retirement ==
After he ended his football career, Cristea worked as a fashion designer, opening a luxury clothing workshop in Bucharest.

== Career statistics ==
=== Club ===
Appearances and goals by club, season and competition
Club	Season	League			Cupa României		Europe		Other		Total	
Club	Season	Division	Apps	Goals	Apps	Goals	Apps	Goals	Apps	Goals	Apps	Goals
Politehnica Iași	2001–02	Divizia C	28	5	1	0	—		—		29	5
Politehnica Iași	2002–03	Divizia B	27	5	4	0	—		—		31	5
Politehnica Iași	2003–04	Divizia B	23	6	2	0	—		—		25	2
Politehnica Iași	2004–05	Divizia A	15	2	0	0	—		—		15	2
Politehnica Iași	Total		93	18	7	0	0	0	0	0	100	18
Dinamo București	2004–05	Divizia A	10	0	2	0	—		—		12	0
Dinamo București	2005–06	Divizia A	15	0	2	0	3 (Note: Appearances in UEFA Cup)	0	0	0	20	0
Dinamo București	2006–07	Liga I	28	3	2	0	10	3	—		40	6
Dinamo București	2007–08	Liga I	32	8	1	0	4 (Note: Two appearances in UEFA Champions League, two appearances in UEFA Cup)	0	1 (Note: Appearance in Supercupa României)	0	38	8
Dinamo București	2008–09	Liga I	31	5	3	1	2	0	—		36	6
Dinamo București	2009–10	Liga I	28	3	4	0	8 (Note: Appearances in UEFA Europa League)	0	—		40	3
Dinamo București	2010–11	Liga I	17	7	1	0	4	1	—		22	8
Dinamo București	Total		161	26	15	1	31	4	1	0	208	31
Universitatea Cluj	2010–11	Liga I	13	3	—		—		—		13	3
Universitatea Cluj	2011–12	Liga I	29	8	0	0	—		—		29	8
Universitatea Cluj	Total		42	11	0	0	0	0	0	0	42	11
Petrolul Ploiești	2012–13	Liga I	15	1	3	2	—		—		18	3
Petrolul Ploiești	2013–14	Liga I	0	0	—		0	0	1	0	1	0
Petrolul Ploiești	Total		15	1	3	2	0	0	1	0	19	3
Standard Liège (loan)	2012–13	Belgian Pro League	8	0	—		—		0	0	8	0
Steaua București	2013–14	Liga I	9	1	0	0	3 (Note: Appearances in UEFA Champions League)	0	—		12	1
Concordia Chiajna	2014–15	Liga I	13	1	1	0	—		—		14	1
Concordia Chiajna	2015–16	Liga I	5	0	0	0	—		1 (Note: Appearances in Cupa Ligii)	0	6	0
Concordia Chiajna	2016–17	Liga I	5	0	1	0	—		1	0	7	0
Concordia Chiajna	Total		23	1	2	0	0	0	2	0	27	1
Career total			351	58	27	3	34	4	4	0	416	65

=== International ===
Appearances and goals by national team and year
National team	Year	Apps	Goals
Romania	2007	5	0
Romania	2008	1	0
Romania	2009	2	0
Romania	2010	0	0
Romania	2011	1	0
Total		9	0

== Honours ==
Politehnica Iași

- Divizia B: 2003–04
- Divizia C: 2001–02

Dinamo București

- Liga I: 2006–07
- Cupa României: 2004–05
- Supercupa Romaniei: 2005

Petrolul Ploiești

- Supercupa României runner-up: 2013

Concordia Chiajna

- Cupa Ligii runner-up: 2015–16
