= Cosmin Pașcovici =

Romanian footballer

Personal information
- Full name: Cosmin Mihai Pașcovici
- Date of birth: 12 April 1978 (age 48)
- Place of birth: Suceava, Romania
- Height: 1.87 m (6 ft 2 in)
- Positions: Left-back; centre-back

Senior career*
Years	Team	Apps	(Gls)
1997	Rocar București	3	(0)
1998	Foresta Fălticeni II	14	(0)
1998–1999	Politehnica Iași	6	(0)
1999–2000	Dorna Vatra Dornei		
2000–2002	Baia Mare	36	(3)
2002	Petrolul Ploiești	12	(1)
2003–2006	Farul Constanța	79	(9)
2006–2007	Dinamo București	4	(0)
2007–2009	UTA Arad	31	(0)
2009–2011	Farul Constanța	24	(0)
2011–2012	Eolica Baia		
Total		209	(13)

International career
2005	Romania	1	(0)
- * Club domestic league appearances and goals

Cosmin Mihai Pașcovici (born 12 April 1978) is a Romanian retired footballer who played as a defender.

== Club career ==
Pașcovici was born on 12 April 1978 in Suceava, Romania and began playing football in 1997 at Rocar București in Divizia B. Half of year later he moved to Foresta Fălticeni II, then in the following season he joined Politehnica Iași. He spent the 1999–2000 season in Divizia C at Dorna Vatra Dornei, returning to Divizia B football after signing with Baia Mare. In 2001, Pașcovici went to play for Petrolul Ploiești where on 27 October he made his Divizia A debut under coach Costel Lazăr in a 3–0 home win over Ceahlăul Piatra Neamț. He scored his first goal in the competition on 16 March 2002, when he closed the scoring in a 2–1 loss in the Ploiești derby against Astra. He stayed with Petrolul for only half a year, then went to play for Farul Constanța. In the 2004–05 season he scored a personal record of five goals, first in a 1–0 win over Dinamo București, the others coming in victories against Politehnica Timișoara, Rapid București, and both legs against Apulum Alba Iulia. At the end of the season, Farul reached the 2005 Cupa României final where coach Petre Grigoraș used him as a starter, replacing him with Mihai Baicu in the 75th minute of a 1–0 loss to Dinamo.

For the 2006–07 season, Pașcovici joined Dinamo, coach Mircea Rednic using him in four games as the team won the title, but he left the club in the middle of the season to go to UTA Arad. In the same season he played two games in the early stages of Dinamo's UEFA Cup campaign, helping the club eliminate Hibernians and Skoda Xanthi as they reached the round of 32. On 1 December 2007, Pașcovici made his last appearance in the Romanian first league, playing for UTA in a 3–1 away loss to his former team, Dinamo, totaling 110 appearances with 10 goals in the competition. Afterwards, UTA was relegated to the second league where he stayed with the club for one season. Subsequently, he went back to play for two seasons at Farul in the same division. Pașcovici ended his career by playing in the 2011–12 third league for Eolica Baia.

== International career ==
Pașcovici made one appearance for Romania on 17 August 2005 when coach Victor Pițurcă sent him in the 80th minute to replace Răzvan Raț in a 2–0 home win over Andorra in the 2006 World Cup qualifiers.

== Controversies ==
During his spell at UTA, Pașcovici got into a physical confrontation with a fan of the team. In his second spell at Farul he had a similar incident in which he was punched several times by a fan.

== Honours ==
Farul Constanța

- Cupa României runner-up: 2004–05

Dinamo București

- Liga I: 2006–07
