= George Curcă =

Romanian footballer (born 1981)

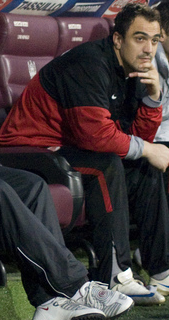

Personal information
- Date of birth: 8 May 1981 (age 45)
- Place of birth: Isaccea, Romania
- Height: 1.87 m (6 ft 1 1/2 in)
- Position: Goalkeeper

Youth career
- Progresul Isaccea
- 1998–2000: Farul Constanța

Senior career*
Years	Team	Apps	(Gls)
2000–2010	Farul Constanța	227	(0)
2009–2010	→ Dinamo București (loan)	8	(0)
2009–2010	→ Dinamo București II (loan)	10	(0)
2010–2012	Dinamo București	4	(0)
2010–2011	→ Dinamo București II (loan)	8	(0)
2011	→ Unirea Urziceni (loan)	13	(0)
2012	→ Farul Constanța (loan)	10	(0)
2012–2014	Farul Constanța	34	(0)
2015	Corby Domino		
Total		314	(0)

International career
2001–2003	Romania U21	8	(0)
2004	Romania B	2	(0)
- * Club domestic league appearances and goals as of 17 July 2018

George Curcă (born 8 May 1981) is a Romanian former professional football player who played as a goalkeeper.

== Club career ==
Curcă was born on 8 May 1981 in Isaccea, Romania and began playing football at local club Progresul. He started his senior career at Farul Constanța, helping it get promoted to the first league at the end of the 2000–01 Divizia B season under the guidance of coach Petre Grigoraș. He made his Divizia A debut on 18 August 2001 in a 3–1 home loss to Rapid București. Farul reached the 2005 Cupa României final where coach Grigoraș used him the entire match in the 1–0 loss to Dinamo București. Afterwards he made five appearances in the 2006 Intertoto Cup, helping the club eliminate Pobeda and Lokomotiv Plovdiv in the first two rounds, being eliminated in the third by Auxerre. At the end of the 2008–09 season, Farul was relegated but he continued to play in the first league, being loaned for the following season to Dinamo.

Afterwards, Curcă was permanently transferred by Dinamo and played four games in the 2010–11 Europa League qualifying phase, managing to get past Olimpia Bălți, being eliminated in the following round by Hajduk Split. He was loaned for the second half of the 2010–11 season at Unirea Urziceni with whom he was relegated at the end of it. At Urziceni, he also made his last appearance in the Romanian first league on 21 May 2011 in a 5–1 away loss to Sportul Studențesc București, totaling 221 matches in the competition. In January 2012, he made a comeback to Farul in the second league, being loaned there by Dinamo. Half a year later, Curcă became Farul's player, spending two more seasons with The Sailors. In 2015 he moved to England where played for a short period at an amateur club from Corby.

== International career ==
Between 2001 and 2003, Curcă made several appearances for Romania's under-21 squad. He played two games in which he did not concede any goals for Romania B in the 2004 Cyprus International Football Tournament, as they got past Belarus in the semi-finals and defeated rivals Hungary 3–0 in the final.

== Personal life ==
His cousin, Cristian Munteanu, was also a goalkeeper and they were colleagues in 2010 at Dinamo București.

== Honours ==
Farul Constanța

- Cupa României runner-up: 2004–05
