= Ion Barbu (footballer, born 1977) =

Romanian footballer (born 1977)

Personal information
- Full name: Ion Barbu
- Date of birth: 14 May 1977 (age 49)
- Place of birth: Scornicești, Romania
- Height: 1.92 m (6 ft 3 1/2 in)
- Position: Centre back

Youth career
- Recolta Chițeasca

Senior career*
Years	Team	Apps	(Gls)
- Olt Scornicești
- Drobeta-Turnu Severin
- Constructorul-Universitatea Craiova
1999	Politehnica Iași	12	(1)
2000–2012	Farul Constanța	254	(14)
2016–2017	Farul Constanța	1	(1)
Total		267	(16)

Managerial career
- 2012: Farul Constanța
- 2014: Farul Constanța (assistant)
- 2014: Farul Constanța (assistant)
- 2014–2015: Farul Constanța
- 2015–2016: Farul Constanța (assistant)
- 2016–2017: Farul Constanța
- 2017–2018: Farul Constanța (assistant)
- 2018: Farul Constanța
- * Club domestic league appearances and goals

Ion Barbu (born 14 May 1977 in Scornicești, Olt County) is a Romanian former professional footballer and currently a manager.

== Playing career ==
Barbu was born on 14 May 1977 in Scornicești, Romania and began playing football at age 9, under the guidance of his father at Recolta Chițeasca. At 14, he started playing senior-level football for Olt Scornicești in Divizia B, and later moved to Drobeta-Turnu Severin in the same league. He went for a while at Universitatea Craiova's satellite team, Constructorul where he worked with coaches Nicolae Tilihoi and Silviu Lung. In 1999, he joined Politehnica Iași in Divizia B. Mid-season, he left the team to sign with Farul Constanța where on 4 March 2000 he made his Divizia A debut under coach Gabriel Zahiu in a 1–1 draw against Astra Ploiești. At the end of his first top-flight season, Farul was relegated to Divizia B, but Barbu stayed with the club, helping it get promoted back to the first league after one year. In the following years he played constantly for the club, becoming its captain, a highlight being the reaching of the 2005 Cupa României final where coach Petre Grigoraș used him the entire match in the 1–0 loss to Dinamo București. Barbu made four appearances in the 2006 Intertoto Cup, helping the team eliminate FK Pobeda and Lokomotiv Plovdiv in the first two rounds, being eliminated in the third one by Auxerre against whom he did not play. In 2009, Farul was relegated once again to the second league where he played for three more seasons. He has a total of 189 matches with nine goals in Divizia A, all of them for Farul. During an interview he gave for Prosport, Barbu said that the most important goal he scored in his career was against international goalkeeper Florin Prunea in a 2–1 win over FCM Bacău which helped Farul earn important points in the fight to avoid relegation.

== Managerial career ==
Barbu started working as head coach at Farul Constanța in 2012, while the club was in Liga II. In the 2016–17 Liga IV season he was player-coach at Farul, helping it gain promotion to Liga III. He worked only at Farul, when the team was in the lower leagues, having several spells as head coach or assistant.

== Honours ==
=== Player ===
Farul Constanța

- Cupa României runner-up: 2004–05
- Liga IV: 2016–17

=== Manager ===
Farul Constanța

- Liga IV: 2016–17
