= Tiberiu Kallo =

Romanian footballer (1943–2024)

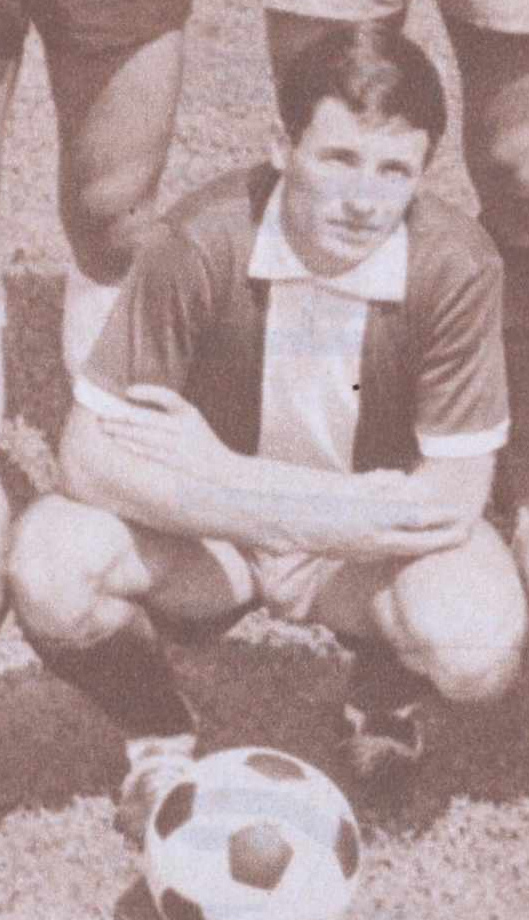

Personal information
- Full name: Tiberiu Calo
- Date of birth: 7 August 1943
- Place of birth: Codlea, Romania
- Date of death: 9 October 2024 (aged 81)
- Place of death: Plopu, Romania
- Height: 1.68 m (5 ft 6 in)
- Position: Attacking midfielder

Senior career*
Years	Team	Apps	(Gls)
1964	Marina Mangalia		
1965–1972	Farul Constanța	157	(25)
1973–1974	CS Târgoviște (Note: The statistics for the 1979–80 and 1980–81 Divizia B seasons are unavailable.)	43	(0)
Total		200	(25)

International career
1967	Romania B	1	(0)
1967	Romania Olympic	1	(0)
1967–1968	Romania	5	(1)
- * Club domestic league appearances and goals

Tiberiu Kallo (7 August 1943 – 9 October 2024) was a Romanian footballer who played as an attacking midfielder.

== Club career ==
Kallo, nicknamed "Căluțul" (The Horsey), was born on 7 August 1943 in Codlea, Romania. He began playing football in 1964 at Divizia C club Marina Mangalia. In 1965 he moved to Farul Constanța, making his Divizia A debut on 9 May under coach Ion Mihăilescu in a 1–0 away loss to Petrolul Ploiești. Kallo spent eight seasons with The Sailors, scoring a personal record of seven goals in the 1967–68 season. He was known for being a good assist provider for goals scored by Marin Tufan, Constantin Iancu or Dumitru Caraman. His best matches were a 4–4 draw against Steaua București in which he scored a brace and provided two assists, and a 4–0 success over Dinamo București where he managed a hat-trick and one assist. He made his last Divizia A appearance on 25 June 1972 in a 2–1 home victory against Universitatea Craiova, having a total of 157 matches with 25 goals scored in the competition. Afterwards, Kallo spent four seasons at Divizia B side CS Târgoviște, ending his career in 1976 at age 34.

== International career ==
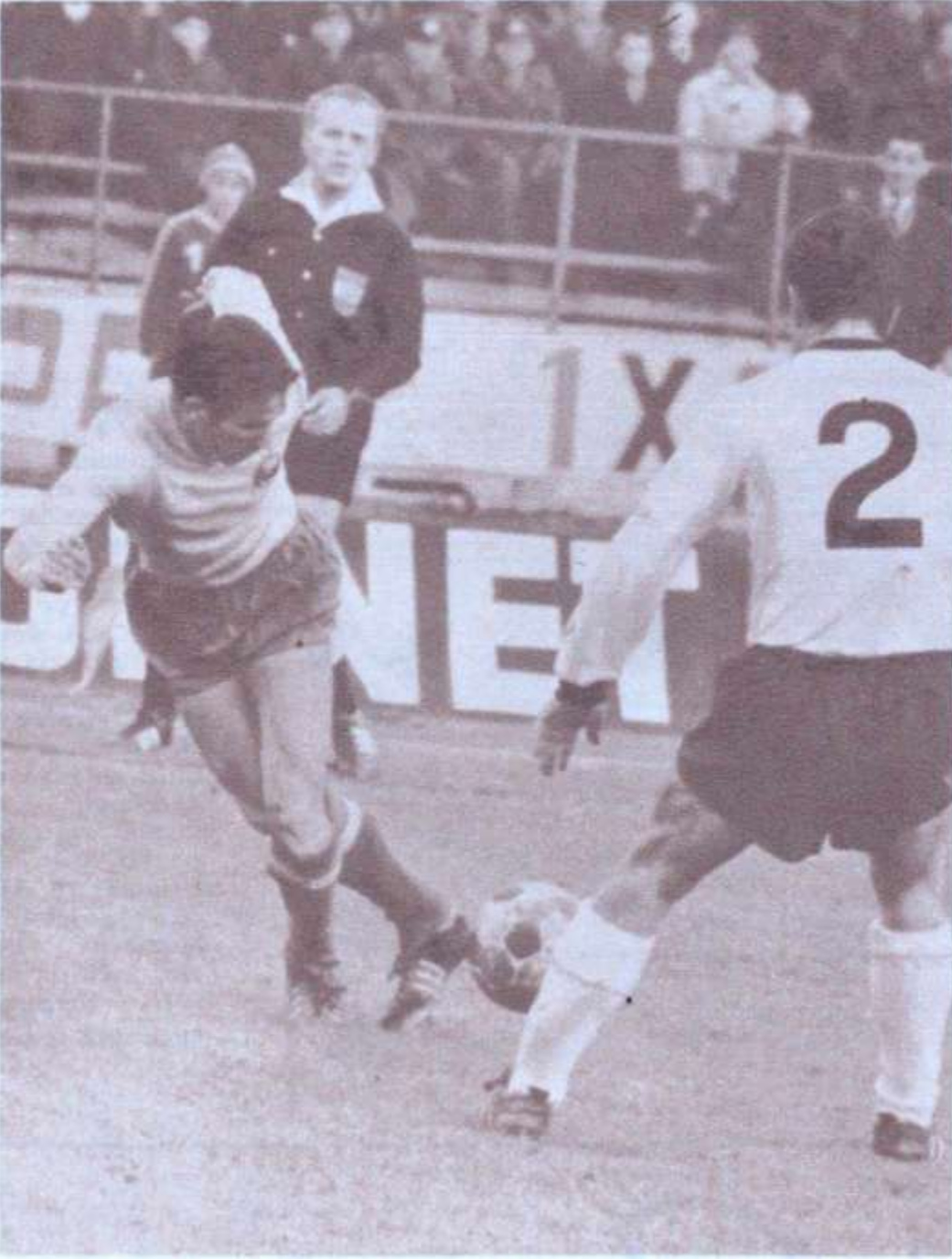
Kallo (left) in action against West Germany in 1967.

Kallo played five games and scored one goal for Romania, making his debut under coach Constantin Teașcă on 29 October 1967, when he came as a substitute and replaced Florea Voinea in the 63rd minute of a 0–0 friendly draw against Poland. He scored his only goal for the national team in a friendly match which ended in a 1–1 draw against Austria.

Kallo's final appearance for Romania was in a 2–0 win over Switzerland in the 1970 World Cup qualifiers. He also appeared once for Romania's Olympic team and once for the B side.

== Personal life and death ==
Kallo had three brothers, two of them Mihai and Nicolae, were also footballers who played in Romania's top division Divizia A.

He died on 9 October 2024 at age 81 in the Plopu village, which is part of the Titu city, where he was settled.

== Career statistics ==
Scores and results list Romania's goal tally first, score column indicates score after each Kallo goal.

List of international goals scored by Tiberiu Kallo
No.	Date	Venue	Opponent	Score	Result	Competition
1	1 May 1968	Linzer Stadion, Linz, Austria	Austria	1–0	1–1	Friendly
