= Turcu (surname) =

Turcu is a Romanian surname. Notable people with the surname include:

- Cristian Turcu (born 1976), Romanian footballer
- Elisabeta Turcu, Romanian artistic gymnast
- Lucian Turcu, Romanian footballer
- Viorel Turcu, Romanian footballer
