= Marian Dinu =

Romanian footballer (born 1965)

Personal information
- Date of birth: 15 August 1965 (age 61)
- Place of birth: Adamclisi, Romania
- Height: 1.89 m (6 ft 2 in)
- Position: Defender

Youth career
- FC Constanța

Senior career*
Years	Team	Apps	(Gls)
1982-1985	Portul Constanța	82	(0)
1985–1998	Farul Constanța	284	(8)
1986–1987	→ Unirea Slobozia (loan)	?	(?)
1998–2000	Callatis Mangalia	34	(6)
Total		318	(14)

Managerial career
- 2000–2002: Farul Constanța (assistant)
- 2004–2005: Farul Constanța (assistant)
- 2005: Farul Constanța (caretaker)
- 2005–2009: Oțelul Galați (assistant)
- 2010–2013: Pandurii Târgu Jiu (assistant)
- 2013: Oțelul Galați (assistant)
- 2013: Oțelul Galați (caretaker)
- 2014: Pandurii Târgu Jiu (assistant)
- 2015: Farul Constanța
- 2015–2016: Târgu Mureș (assistant)
- 2016: Poli Timișoara (assistant)
- 2016–2017: Pandurii Târgu Jiu (assistant)
- 2017–2018: Farul Constanța (assistant)
- 2018–2019: Farul Constanța (assistant)
- * Club domestic league appearances and goals

Marian Dinu (born 15 August 1965) is a Romanian football coach and former player. As a coach, he works with Petre Grigoraș, being his assistant coach at Farul Constanţa, Oţelul Galaţi, Pandurii Târgu Jiu, ASA Târgu Mureș and Poli Timișoara.

Dinu played for Farul Constanța 284 times and scored 7 times, being the second, after Antonescu, in the top of presences. He also played for Callatis Mangalia and Unirea Slobozia.
