= Costin Caraman =

Romanian footballer

Personal information
- Date of birth: 20 October 1971 (age 55)
- Place of birth: Constanța, Romania
- Position: Striker

Senior career*
Years	Team	Apps	(Gls)
1992–1993	Farul Constanța	12	(3)
1993	Cernolovetz		
1994	Dobrudzha Dobrich	4	(1)
1994–1995	FC Brașov	26	(4)
1995	Olimpia Satu Mare	5	(1)
1996	FC Brașov	8	(0)
1996–1998	Sportul Studențesc București	56	(6)
1998–1999	Astra Ploiești	29	(7)
2000	Poiana Câmpina	5	(2)
2000	Farul Constanța	1	(0)
2001	Callatis Mangalia	13	(5)
Total		159	(29)
- * Club domestic league appearances and goals

Costin Caraman (born 20 October 1971) is a Romanian former footballer who played as a striker. His father, Dumitru Caraman was also a footballer.
