= 2005 Supercupa României =

- Event: 2005 Supercupa României
Steaua București	Dinamo București
Divizia A	Cupa României
2	3
- Date: 31 July 2005
- Venue: Stadionul Cotroceni, Bucharest
- Referee: Cristian Balaj (Romania)
- Attendance: 12,000

The 2005 Supercupa României was the 8th edition of Romania's season opener cup competition. The match was played in Bucharest at Stadionul Cotroceni on 31 July 2005, and was contested between Divizia A title holders, Steaua and Cupa României champions, Dinamo. Dinamo won the trophy.

== Match ==
=== Details ===
31 July 2005
21:00 EEST

Steaua București	2–3	Dinamo București
Dică 15'; Iacob 44'	Report	Bratu 38'; Bălţoi 69'; Niculescu 84'

Stadionul Cotroceni, Bucharest
Attendance: 12,000
Referee: Cristian Balaj (Romania)

Steaua București	Dinamo București

STEAUA BUCUREŞTI:
GK	33	(Belarus) Vasil Khamutowski
RB	20	(Romania) George Ogăraru (c)
CB	17	(Romania) Eugen Baciu
CB	24	(Romania) Sorin Ghionea
LB	15	(Romania) Mihai Neşu	(yellow card) 25'	(substituted off) 64'
RW	16	(Romania) Bănel Nicoliţă
CM	22	(Romania) Sorin Paraschiv
DM	28	(Romania) Florin Lovin
LW	11	(Romania) Gabriel Boștină
AM	10	(Romania) Nicolae Dică		(substituted off) 58'
CF	19	(Romania) Victoraş Iacob	(yellow card) 52'	(substituted off) 60'
Substitutes:
MF	––	(Bosnia and Herzegovina) Boris Keča		(substituted on) 64'
FW	21	(Romania) Andrei Cristea		(substituted on) 60'
FW	––	(Romania) Valentin Simion	(yellow card) 72'	(substituted on) 58'
Manager:
(Ukraine) Oleh Protasov

DINAMO BUCUREŞTI:
GK	1	(Belarus) Uladzimir Haew
DF	2	(Ivory Coast) Mariko Daouda
DF	5	(Romania) Gabriel Tamaş		(substituted off) 46'
DF	4	(Romania) Cosmin Moţi
DF	3	(Romania) Cristian Pulhac
MF	8	(Romania) Florentin Petre (c)
MF	18	(Romania) Andrei Mărgăritescu	(yellow card) 19'
MF	10	(Romania) Ştefan Grigorie
FW	22	(Romania) Vlad Munteanu		(substituted off) 69'
FW	21	(Romania) Florin Bratu	(yellow card) 50'	(substituted off) 65'
FW	9	(Romania) Claudiu Niculescu	(yellow card) 31'
Substitutes:
DF	27	(Romania) Lucian Goian		(substituted on) 46'
FW	17	(Romania) Alexandru Bălţoi	(yellow card) 86'	(substituted on) 65'
MF	15	(Romania) Ianis Zicu		(substituted on) 69'
Manager:
(Romania) Ioan Andone

MATCH OFFICIALS

- Assistant referees:
  - Cristian Nica
  - Zoltan Szekely
- Fourth official:

MAN OF THE MATCH

MATCH RULES

- 90 minutes.
- 30 minutes extra-time (15 minute intervals)
- Penalty shoot-out if scores level after extra time.
- Seven named substitutes
- Maximum of 3 substitutions.

== See also ==
- Eternal derby (Romania)
- 2005–06 Divizia A
- 2005–06 Cupa României
