= Pavel Peniu =

Romanian footballer

Personal information
- Date of birth: 29 June 1953 (age 73)
- Place of birth: Babadag, Romania
- Height: 1.79 m (5 ft 10 in)
- Positions: Central midfielder; attacking midfielder

Team information
- Current team: Farul Constanța (youth center director)

Youth career
- 1969–1971: Granitul Babadag

Senior career*
Years	Team	Apps	(Gls)
1971–1972	Granitul Babadag	25	(0)
1972–1973	Delta Tulcea	12	(0)
1973–1974	Chimia Râmnicu Vâlcea	2	(0)
1974	Știința Constanța		
1975–1983	FC Constanța (Note: The statistics for the 1979–80 and 1980–81 Divizia B seasons are unavailable.)	156	(37)
1983–1984	CS Târgoviște	6	(1)
Total		201	(38)

International career
1977	Romania	1	(0)

Managerial career
- 2009–2019: Viitorul Constanța (chairman)
- 2019–2021: Viitorul Constanța (youth center director)
- 2021–: Farul Constanța (youth center director)
- * Club domestic league appearances and goals

Pavel Peniu (born 29 June 1953) is a Romanian former footballer. He also worked as president at Farul Constanța and at Gheorghe Hagi's team Viitorul Constanța.

== International career ==
Pavel Peniu played one game at international level for Romania in a 6–1 victory against Greece.

== Honours ==
Chimia Râmnicu Vâlcea

- Divizia B: 1973–74

FC Constanța

- Divizia B: 1980–81
