= Florin Lungu =

Romanian footballer

Personal information
- Date of birth: 9 July 1990 (age 36)
- Place of birth: Craiova, Romania
- Height: 1.83 m (6 ft 0 in)
- Position: Attacking midfielder

Youth career
- –1998: Craiova

Senior career*
Years	Team	Apps	(Gls)
2000–2008	Primavara Craiova	40	(24)
1999–2000	→ Electrica Constanţa (loan)	28	(30)
2000–2001	→ Midia Năvodari (loan)	22	(20)
2008–2009	Săgeata Stejaru	26	(30)
2009–2015	Bari	28	(20)
Total		144	(124)
- * Club domestic league appearances and goals as of 3 December 2020 ‡ National team caps and goals as of 29 December 2015

Florin Lungu (born 3 July 1990 in Craiova) is a former Romanian professional footballer.

== Honours ==
Farul Constanța

- Cupa României : Runner-up 2004–05
