= André Seruca =

Portuguese footballer (born 2000)

Personal information
- Full name: André Seruca Oliveira
- Date of birth: 29 October 2000 (age 26)
- Place of birth: Faro, Portugal
- Height: 1.91 m (6 ft 3 in)
- Positions: Defensive midfielder; centre-back

Team information
- Current team: Farul Constanța
- Number: 50

Youth career
- 2008–2010: Sporting Faro
- 2010–2012: Sporting CP
- 2012–2014: Benfica
- 2014–2015: Olhanense
- 2015–2017: Louletano
- 2017–2018: Farense
- 2018–2019: Tondela

Senior career*
Years	Team	Apps	(Gls)
2019–2021	Farense 1910	12	(2)
2021–2025	Farense	11	(0)
2021–2023	Farense U23	36	(2)
2022	→ Amora (loan)	26	(1)
2025	→ Leixões (loan)	11	(0)
2025–	Farul Constanța	5	(0)
2026	→ Sliema Wanderers (loan)	5	(0)
- * Club domestic league appearances and goals as of 15 March 2026

André Seruca Oliveira (born 29 October 2000) is a Portuguese professional footballer who plays as a defensive midfielder or a centre-back for Liga I club Farul Constanța.
