= Alexandru Grigoraș =

Romanian footballer

Personal information
- Full name: Alexandru Grigoraș
- Date of birth: July 5, 1989 (age 37)
- Place of birth: Constanta, Romania
- Height: 1.83 m (6 ft 0 in)
- Position: Striker

Youth career
- Callatis Mangalia
- 1997–2008: Farul Constanța

Senior career*
| Years | Team | Apps | (Gls) |
| 2008–2010 | Farul Constanța II | | |
| 2010–2011 | Callatis Mangalia | | |
| 2011–2013 | Pandurii Târgu Jiu | 39 | (1) |
| 2013–2014 | Săgeata Năvodari | 9 | (0) |
| 2014 | Brașov | 1 | (0) |
| 2015 | Farul Constanța | 17 | (0) |
| 2016 | Delta Tulcea | | |
| 2016–2019 | Farul Constanţa | 41 | (15) |
| 2022–2023 | Axiopolis Cernavodă | | |
| Total | | 107 | (16) |
- * Club domestic league appearances and goals as of 15:11, 11 January 2024 (UTC)

Alexandru Grigoraş (born 5 July 1989) is a Romanian former footballer who played as a striker for teams such as Farul Constanța, Pandurii Târgu Jiu or Săgeata Năvodari, among others.

== Career ==
Grigoraș began playing football as an attacker with Callatis Mangalia in the lower levels of Romanian football. In June 2011, he was out of contract and signed with Romanian Liga I side Pandurii Târgu Jiu, a club managed by his father, Petre Grigoraș.

== Honours ==
=== Club ===
Pandurii

- Liga I (1): runner-up 2013
