= 2000–01 Divizia B =

Divizia B
- Season: 2000–01
- Promoted: Sportul Studențesc; UM Timișoara; Farul Constanța
- Relegated: Metrom Brașov; Apemin Borsec; Drobeta-Turnu Severin; Corvinul Hunedoara; Callatis Mangalia; Electro Craiova; Juventus București; FCM Râmnicu Vâlcea; Precizia Săcele; Cetate Deva; Politehnica Iași; Inter Sibiu
- Top goalscorer: Ionuț Mazilu (12 goals)

The 2000–01 Divizia B was the 61st season of the second tier of the Romanian football league system.

The format has been maintained to two series, each of them having 18 teams. At the end of the season, the winners of the series promoted to Divizia A and the last six places from both series relegated to Divizia C. Two more teams relegated this season due to the reduction of team in the next season, from 36 (2x18) to 32 (2x16). A promotion play-off was played between the 13th and 14th-placed in the Divizia A and the runners-up of the Divizia B series.

== Team changes ==
=== To Divizia B ===
Promoted from Divizia C

- Apemin Borsec
- Hondor Agigea**
- Fulgerul Bragadiru
- Cetate Deva
- Pandurii Târgu Jiu
- Baia Mare

Relegated from Divizia A

- Farul Constanța
- FC Onești
- CSM Reșița
- Extensiv Craiova

=== From Divizia B ===
Relegated to Divizia C

- Dacia Pitești
- Petrolul Moinești
- Dunărea Galați
- Chimica Târnăveni
- Chindia Târgoviște
- Universitatea Cluj
- Gloria Buzău
- Minerul Motru

Promoted to Divizia A

- Foresta Suceava
- Gaz Metan Mediaș

=== Note (**) ===
Hondor Agigea promoted but due to financial problems sold its place to Metalul Plopeni.

=== Renamed teams ===
Poiana Câmpina was renamed as Dinamo Poiana Câmpina and started to be the second squad of Dinamo București.

Electro-Bere Craiova was renamed as Electro Craiova.

Flacăra Râmnicu Vâlcea was renamed as FCM Râmnicu Valcea.

== League map ==
Locations of Divizia B clubs by series
Seria I Seria II

== League tables ==
=== Seria I ===
Pos	Team	Pld	W	D	L	GF	GA	GD	Pts	Qualification
1	Sportul Studențesc București (C, P)	34	25	6	3	71	17	+54	81	Promotion to Divizia A
2	Farul Constanța (O, P)	34	23	5	6	58	29	+29	74	Qualification to promotion play-off
3	Midia Năvodari	34	19	5	10	54	31	+23	62	
4	Laminorul Roman	34	18	6	10	56	40	+16	60	
5	Fulgerul Bragadiru	34	14	13	7	43	35	+8	55	
6	Metalul Plopeni	34	15	8	11	39	34	+5	53	
7	Dinamo Poiana Câmpina	34	15	6	13	39	36	+3	51	Ineligible for promotion
8	Metrom Brașov (Note: Metrom Brașov sold its place in the second tier to Cimentul Fieni, club which was spared from relegation.) (R)	34	14	9	11	33	30	+3	51	Relegation to Divizia C
9	Tractorul Brașov	34	14	8	12	45	35	+10	50	
10	FC Onești	34	14	5	15	43	49	−6	47	
11	ARO Câmpulung	34	14	4	16	41	44	−3	46	
12	Diplomatic Focșani	34	11	12	11	34	24	+10	45	
13	Apemin Borsec (R)	34	13	6	15	40	45	−5	45	Relegation to Divizia C
14	Cimentul Fieni (Note: Cimentul Fieni bought its place in the second tier from Metrom Brașov, club which continued to play in the third tier instead of Cimentul.)	34	12	7	15	44	44	0	43	Spared from relegation
15	Callatis Mangalia (R)	34	9	8	17	38	50	−12	35	Relegation to Divizia C
16	Juventus București (R)	34	8	6	20	42	63	−21	30	Relegation to Divizia C
17	Precizia Săcele (R)	34	5	5	24	24	62	−38	20	Relegation to Divizia C
18	Politehnica Iași (R)	34	2	3	29	20	96	−76	9	Relegation to Divizia C

Updated to match(es) played on 30 June 2001. Source: romaniansoccer.ro (in Romanian)
Rules for classification: 1) Points; 2) Head-to-head points; 3) Head-to-head goal difference; 4) Head-to-head goals scored; 5) Head-to-head away goals scored; 6) Goal difference; 7) Goals scored.
(C) Champions; (O) Play-off winners; (P) Promoted; (R) Relegated

=== Seria II ===
Pos	Team	Pld	W	D	L	GF	GA	GD	Pts	Qualification
1	UM Timișoara (C, P)	30	18	6	6	57	26	+31	60	Promotion to Divizia A
2	Baia Mare (Note: Baia Mare won the promotion play-off match against Foresta Fălticeni, but sold its place in Divizia A to FCM Bacău.) (O)	30	18	5	7	50	22	+28	59	Qualification to promotion play-off
3	CSM Reșița	30	18	4	8	52	29	+23	58	
4	Bihor Oradea	30	14	6	10	31	24	+7	48	
5	Electroputere Craiova	30	13	7	10	39	35	+4	46	
6	Pandurii Târgu Jiu	30	13	6	11	36	32	+4	45	
7	UTA Arad	30	12	6	12	44	37	+7	42	
8	Politehnica Timișoara	30	13	3	14	43	35	+8	42	
9	Apulum Alba Iulia	30	13	2	15	38	53	−15	41	
10	Olimpia Satu Mare	30	13	1	16	37	48	−11	40	
11	Jiul Petroșani	30	11	6	13	38	40	−2	39	
12	ASA Târgu Mureș	30	11	4	15	34	49	−15	37	
13	Drobeta-Turnu Severin (R)	30	11	4	15	38	56	−18	37	Relegation to Divizia C
14	Corvinul Hunedoara (R)	30	10	4	16	25	33	−8	34	Relegation to Divizia C
15	Electro Craiova (R)	30	10	1	19	25	44	−19	31	Relegation to Divizia C
16	FCM Râmnicu Vâlcea (R)	30	7	5	18	34	58	−24	26	Relegation to Divizia C
17	Cetate Deva (Note: Cetate Deva withdrew in the first part of the season and all its results were cancelled.) (R)	0	0	0	0	0	0	0	0	Relegation to Divizia C
18	Inter Sibiu (Note: Inter Sibiu withdrew in the first part of the season and all its results were cancelled.) (R)	0	0	0	0	0	0	0	0	Relegation to Divizia C

Updated to match(es) played on 30 June 2001. Source: romaniansoccer.ro (in Romanian)
Rules for classification: 1) Points; 2) Head-to-head points; 3) Head-to-head goal difference; 4) Head-to-head goals scored; 5) Head-to-head away goals scored; 6) Goal difference; 7) Goals scored.
(C) Champions; (O) Play-off winners; (P) Promoted; (R) Relegated

== Divizia A play-off ==
The 13th and 14th-placed teams of the Divizia A faced the 2nd-placed teams of the Divizia B.

Team 1	Agg.	Team 2	1st leg	2nd leg
FCM Bacău	3–3 (a.e.t.) (3-4 p)	Farul Constanța	1–2	2–1
Foresta Fălticeni	2–2	Baia Mare	0–1	2–1

Note: FC Baia Mare sold their 2001–02 Divizia A place to FCM Bacău.

20 June 2001	Farul Constanța	2–1	FCM Bacău	Constanța
	L.Mihai 44'; Cristocea 60'	Report	Vetrea 9'	Stadium: Farul; Attendance: 12,000; Referee: Marian Salomir (Cluj-Napoca)

20 June 2001	Baia Mare	1–0	Foresta Fălticeni	Baia Mare
	Dumitrașcu 45'	Report		Stadium: Dealul Florilor; Attendance: 12,000

24 June 2001	FCM Bacău	2–1 (a.e.t.) (3–4 p)	Farul Constanța	Bacău
18:00 EEST (UTC+3)	Raț 13'; Ciobanu 73' (pen.)	Report	Abăluță 80'	Stadium: Municipal; Attendance: 17,000; Referee: Marian Dorobanțu (Râmnicu Sărat)

24 June 2001	Foresta Fălticeni	2–1	Baia Mare	Suceava
18:00 EEST (UTC+3)	Gavrilescu 8'; Păcurar 15'	Report	Ciocan 31'	Stadium: Areni; Attendance: 15,000; Referee: Alexandru Tudor (Bucharest)

== Top scorers ==
12 goals

- (Romania) Ionuț Mazilu (Sportul Studențesc)

11 goals

- (Romania) Alexandru Bălțoi (Poiana Câmpina)

9 goals

- (Romania) Cristian Ciubotariu (Sportul Studențesc)
- (Romania) Cristian Dicu (Midia Năvodari)

8 goals

- (Romania) Florin Bratu (Tractorul Brașov)
- (Romania) Dorel Zaharia (Callatis Mangalia)
- (Romania) Virgil Marșavela (Metrom Brașov)
- (Romania) Mircea Oprea (Fulgerul Bragadiru)

7 goals

- (Romania) Romulus Miclea (ASA Târgu Mureș)

== See also ==
- 2000–01 Divizia A
