= Adrian Vlas =

Romanian footballer

Personal information
- Date of birth: 12 January 1982 (age 44)
- Place of birth: Constanța, Romania
- Height: 1.87 m (6 ft 1 1/2 in)
- Position: Goalkeeper

Youth career
- Farul Constanța

Senior career*
Years	Team	Apps	(Gls)
2000–2010	Farul Constanța	65	(0)
2003–2004	→ Electrica Constanța (loan)	21	(0)
2010–2011	Viitorul Constanța	6	(0)
2011–2013	Eolica Baia		
2013–2015	Callatis Mangalia		
Total		92	(0)

Managerial career
- 2015–: Farul Constanța (youth)
- * Club domestic league appearances and goals as of 17 July 2018

Adrian Vlas (born 12 January 1982) is a Romanian former professional footballer who played as a goalkeeper. Vlas started his career at Farul Constanța, club for which he played almost his entire career. In 2015 after two seasons spent at Callatis Mangalia, Vlas announced his retirement and started a new career, as a goalkeeping coach.
