= Dumitru Antonescu =

Romanian footballer

Personal information
- Date of birth: 25 March 1945
- Place of birth: Constanța, Romania
- Date of death: 25 April 2016 (aged 71)
- Place of death: Bucharest, Romania
- Height: 1.76 m (5 ft 9 in)
- Position: Defender

Youth career
- 1957–1965: Electrica Constanța
- 1965–1966: Steaua București

Senior career*
| Years | Team | Apps | (Gls) |
| 1966–1983 | FC Constanța (Note: The statistics for the 1978–79, 1979–80 and 1980–81 Divizia B seasons are unavailable.) | 390 | (12) |
| 1979 | → Șoimii Cernavodă (loan) | | |

International career
| 1972–1974 | Romania | 13 | (0) |

Managerial career
- 1985–1987: Dunărea Călărași
- * Club domestic league appearances and goals

Dumitru Antonescu (25 March 1945 – 25 April 2016) was a Romanian football player.

== Club career ==
Antonescu was born on 25 March 1945 in Constanța, Romania and began playing junior-level football in 1957 at local club Electrica, after four years moving to Steaua București for one year. Afterwards he returned to play at senior level for his hometown team FC Constanța, making his Divizia A debut on 15 February 1967 under coach Virgil Mărdărescu in a 1–0 victory against Petrolul Ploiești, the team finishing the season in fourth place. In his 17 seasons spent at FC Constanța, the highlights were another fourth place in the 1973–74 season and a personal record of seven goals netted in the 1976–77 season. He managed to become the club's all-time leader of Divizia A appearances with 390 games in which he scored 12 goals. During his years spent with The Sailors, the team also suffered a relegation at the end of the 1977–78 season, but Antonescu stayed with the club, helping it earn promotion back to the first league three years later. For the way he played in 1973, Antonescu was placed fourth in the ranking for the Romanian Footballer of the Year award. In 1979 he spent a short period playing for Șoimii Cernavodă in Divizia C. He made his last Divizia A appearance on 24 November 1982 in Farul's 1–1 draw against Dinamo București.

== International career ==
Antonescu played 13 games for Romania, making his debut on 29 October 1972 under coach Angelo Niculescu in a 2–0 home win over Albania in the 1974 World Cup qualifiers. In these qualifiers he appeared in a total of five matches, including Romania's biggest ever victory, a 9–0 win over Finland. He also played in a 3–1 victory against Greece in the 1973–76 Balkan Cup. His last game for the national team was a 0–0 draw against Denmark in the Euro 1976 qualifiers.

== Managerial career ==
After he ended his playing career, Antonescu was coach from 1985 until 1987 at Dunărea Călărași. He then worked at Farul Constanța's youth center for almost three decades, spending the last year of his life as a technical director at ACS Prejmer.

== Death ==
Antonescu died on 25 April 2016 in a hospital in Bucharest at age 71.

== Honours ==
FC Constanța

- Divizia B: 1980–81

Individual

- Romanian Footballer of the Year (fourth place): 1973
