= Octavian Brânzei =

Romanian footballer

Personal information
- Date of birth: 28 September 1928
- Place of birth: Beba Veche, Romania
- Date of death: 28 July 1994 (aged 65)
- Place of death: Constanța, Romania
- Height: 1.78 m (5 ft 10 in)
- Position: Defender

Senior career*
Years	Team	Apps	(Gls)
1947–1949	Electrica Timișoara		
1949–1958	Știința Timișoara (Note: The statistics for the 1952 Divizia B season are unavailable, also the 1957 championship called Cupa Primăverii is unofficial, so the appearances and goals scored at that competition for Știința Timișoara are not official.)	151	(6)
1958–1959	CFR Timișoara		
1960–1962	Farul Constanța (Note: The statistics for the 1961–62 Divizia B season are unavailable.)	34	(0)
1963	IMU Medgidia		
Total		185	(6)

International career
1956–1957	Romania	2	(0)
- * Club domestic league appearances and goals

Octavian Brânzei (28 September 1928 – 28 July 1994) was a Romanian footballer who played as a defender.

== Club career ==
Brânzei was born on 28 September 1928 in Beba Veche, Romania and began playing football in 1947 at Electrica Timișoara. Two years later he moved to neighboring club Știința, where on 19 March 1950 he made his Divizia A debut under coach Rudolf Bürger in a 0–0 draw against Locomotiva București. At the end of the 1951 season, the team was relegated to Divizia B, but Brânzei stayed with the club, helping it get promoted back after one year. He was part of Știința's team that won the 1957–58 Cupa României, the first trophy in the club's history. However, coach Dincă Schileru did not use him in the final. In 1958 he went to play for one season at Divizia B team, CFR Timișoara.

Afterwards he switched clubs again, joining Farul Constanța with whom he was relegated at the end of his first season. He helped the club get promoted back to the first league after one year. He made his last Divizia A appearance on 2 December 1962 in Farul's 4–1 home victory against Dinamo Bacău, totaling 185 matches with six goals in the competition. Brânzei ended his career in 1963 at Divizia B club, IMU Medgidia.

== International career ==
Brânzei played two games for Romania, making his debut under coach Gheorghe Popescu in a 2–0 friendly loss to Bulgaria. He also played in a 3–0 victory against Greece in the 1958 World Cup qualifiers.

== Death ==
Brânzei died on 28 July 1994 at age 65 in Constanța, Romania.

In 2008, he was post-mortem named Honorary Citizen of Timișoara.

== Honours ==
Știința Timișoara

- Divizia B: 1952
- Cupa României: 1957–58

Farul Constanța

- Divizia B: 1961–62
