= Daniel Ciucă =

Romanian footballer

Personal information
- Date of birth: 1 June 1966 (age 60)
- Place of birth: Reghin, Romania
- Height: 1.86 m (6 ft 1 in)
- Position: Right back

Youth career
- Sportul Studențesc București

Senior career*
| Years | Team | Apps | (Gls) |
| 1985 | Sportul Studențesc București | 0 | (0) |
| 1986 | Progresul București | | |
| 1986–1987 | Farul Constanța | | |
| 1987–1992 | Sportul Studențesc București | 106 | (2) |
| 1993 | FC Konstanz | | |
| 1993–1995 | Egelsbach | 54 | (7) |
| 1995–2003 | Rot-Weiß Oberhausen | 226 | (12) |
| 2003–2004 | Darmstadt 98 | 19 | (4) |
| 2004–2005 | Eschborn | 27 | (3) |
| 2005–2006 | SpVgg Erzhausen | 11 | (1) |
| Total | | 443 | (29) |

International career
| 1988 | Romania | 3 | (1) |

Managerial career
- 2008: Germania Ober-Roden
- 2014–2015: FCA Darmstadt
- * Club domestic league appearances and goals

Daniel Ciucă (born 1 June 1966) is a Romanian former footballer who played as a right defender. After he ended his playing career he worked as a sports agent and manager.

== International career ==
Daniel Ciucă played three friendly games at international level for Romania, scoring one goal at his debut in a 2–0 victory against Israel.
