= Lucian Turcu =

Romanian footballer

Personal information
- Full name: Lucian Dan Turcu
- Date of birth: 3 October 1986 (age 40)
- Place of birth: Cluj-Napoca, Romania
- Height: 1.76 m (5 ft 9 1/2 in)
- Position: Left back

Team information
- Current team: Farul Constanța (fitness coach)

Youth career
- –2002: Universitatea Cluj

Senior career*
Years	Team	Apps	(Gls)
2002–2004	Universitatea Cluj	10	(0)
2004–2005	Sportul Studențesc	1	(0)
2005–2006	CFR Timișoara	13	(3)
2006–2007	Politehnica II Timișoara	20	(2)
2007–2009	Gloria Bistrița	21	(0)
2008–2009	→ FCM Târgu Mureș (loan)	2	(0)
2010–2011	Săgeata Năvodari	19	(3)
2011–2013	Viitorul Constanța	30	(1)
2013	Universitatea Cluj	9	(0)
2014	ASA Târgu Mureș	2	(0)
2014–2016	CS Unirea Jucu		
Total		127	(9)

Managerial career
- 2019–2021: Universitatea Cluj (fitness coach)
- 2021–2022: Concordia Chiajna (fitness coach)
- 2022: Politehnica Iași (fitness coach)
- 2022–2023: Universitatea Cluj (fitness coach)
- 2023–2025: Universitatea Cluj (fitness coach)
- 2026–: Farul Constanța (fitness coach)
- * Club domestic league appearances and goals

Lucian Dan Turcu (born 3 October 1986) is a former Romanian professional footballer who played as a left back, currently fitness coach at Liga I club Farul Constanța.
