= Dumitru Caraman =

Romanian footballer (1944–2026)

Personal information
- Date of birth: 22 December 1944
- Place of birth: Mihail Kogălniceanu, Romania
- Date of death: 6 October 2026 (aged 81)
- Position: Central midfielder

Senior career*
Years	Team	Apps	(Gls)
1965–1966	Farul Constanța	7	(1)
1967–1970	Portul Constanța (Note: The statistics for the 1966–67 Divizia C season are unavailable.)	72	(0)
1970–1975	Farul Constanța	136	(32)
1975–1976	FC Brăila		
Total		215	(33)
- * Club domestic league appearances and goals

Dumitru Caraman (22 December 1944 – 6 October 2026) was a Romanian footballer who played as a midfielder.

Caraman died on 6 October 2026, at the age of 81. His son, Costin Caraman, was also a footballer.

== Honours ==
Portul Constanța

- Divizia C: 1966–67
