= Marin Tufan =

Romanian footballer

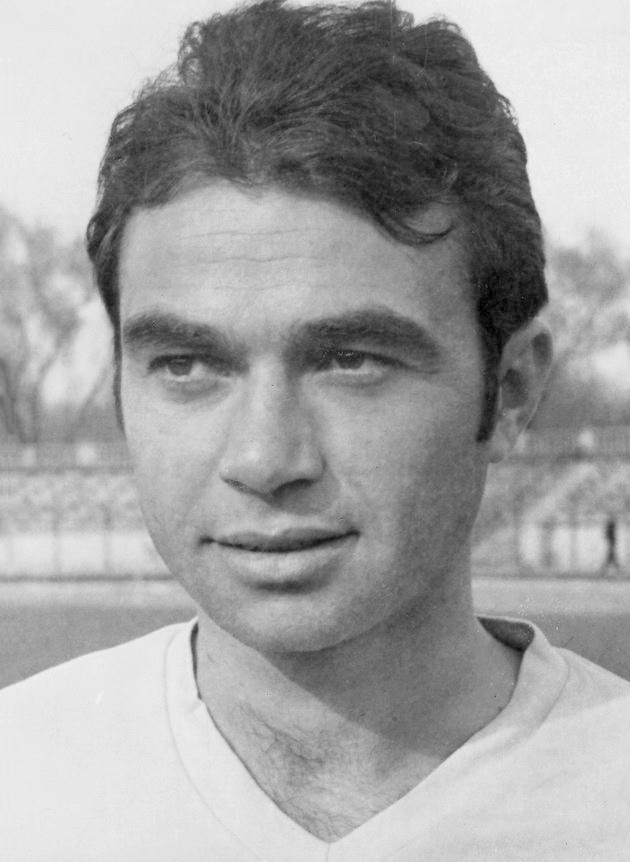

Personal information
- Date of birth: 16 October 1942 (age 84)
- Place of birth: Istria, Romania
- Height: 1.72 m (5 ft 8 in)
- Position: Striker

Youth career
- Cimentul Medgidia

Senior career*
Years	Team	Apps	(Gls)
1961–1963	Cimentul Medgidia		
1963–1973	Farul Constanța	230	(62)
1973–1977	SC Tulcea	62	(17)
Total		292	(79)

International career
1967	Romania B	1	(0)
1969–1970	Romania	2	(0)

Managerial career
- 1977–1978: Granitul Babadag
- * Club domestic league appearances and goals as of 17 July 2018

Marin Tufan (born 16 October 1942) is a Romanian former football player who played as a striker, spending most of his career playing for Farul Constanța.

== Club career ==
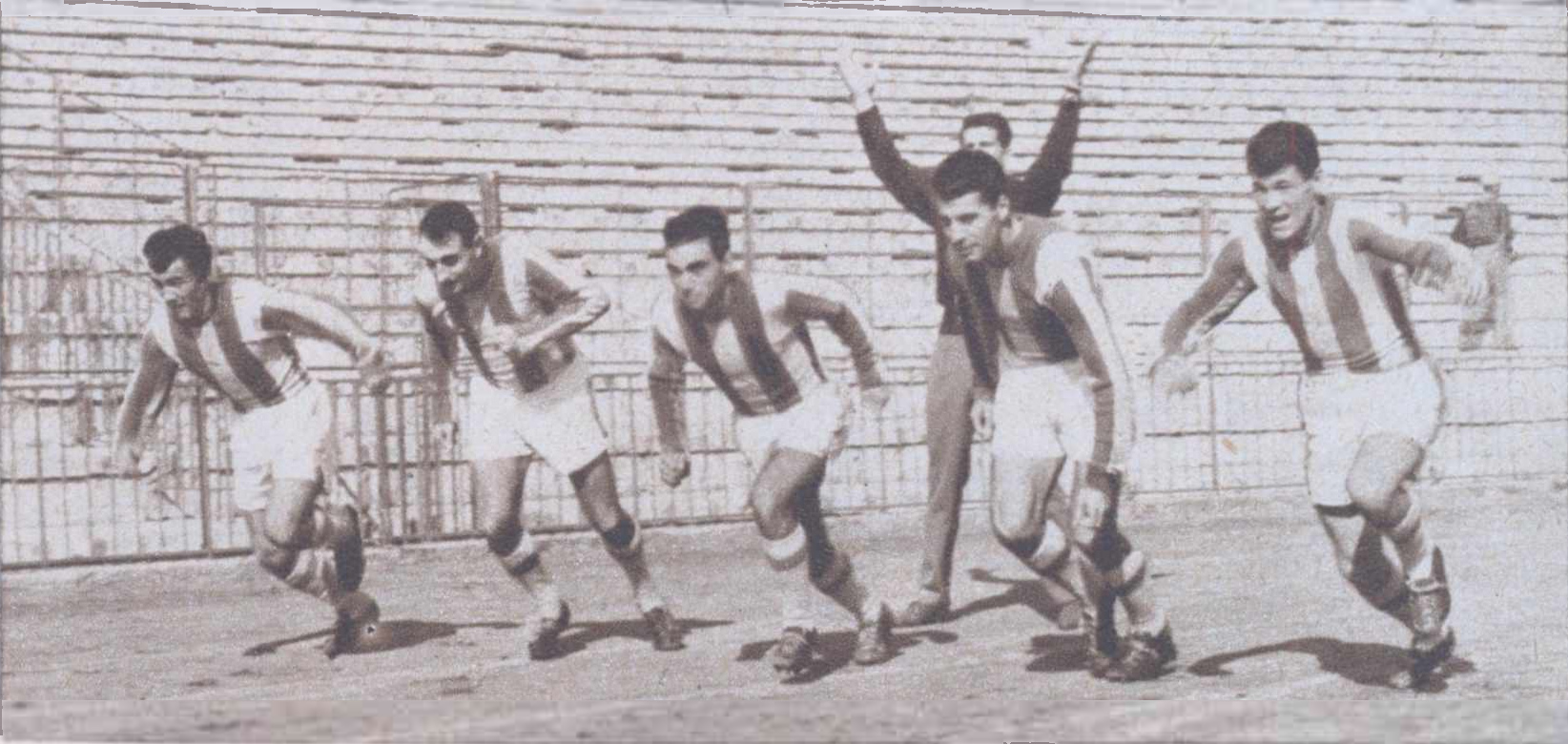
Tufan (third from left) during a Farul training session in 1963

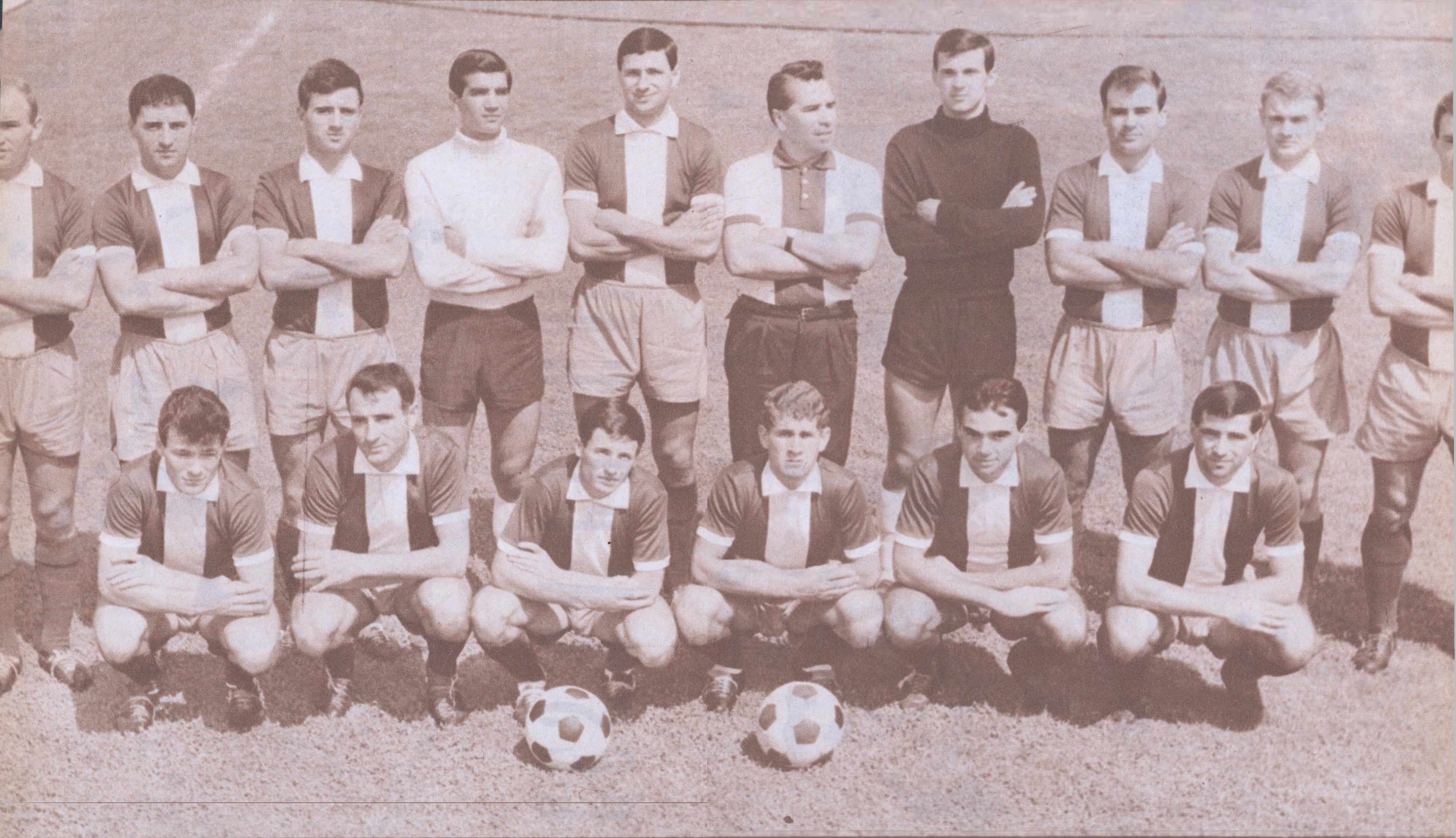
Tufan (second from right, front row) with Farul Constanța in 1965

Tufan was born on 16 October 1942 in Istria, Constanța, Romania, growing up in Sinoe. He began playing football at age 18 as a junior at Cimentul Medgidia where his first coach was Kostas Choumis. Shortly afterwards he started to play for the senior squad of Cimentul in Divizia C. He was noticed in a friendly against Farul Constanța by the opponent's coach Petre Steinbach, who brought him to the club, giving him his Divizia A debut on 15 September 1963 in the last 20 minutes of a 2–0 away loss to UTA Arad. In the following game, a 4–0 home win over Știința Timișoara he scored a double, and his offensive partner, Constantin Dinulescu, also scored a brace. Over the course of ten seasons, Tufan appeared in 230 Divizia A matches, being the all-time Divizia A top-scorer of Farul with 62 goals. The highlight of this period was a fourth place while working with coach Virgil Mărdărescu at the end of the 1966–67 season. In the 1968–69 season, he netted a career-best of 13 goals. He made his last appearance in the competition on 13 May 1973 in a 0–0 draw against Petrolul Ploiești. Tufan ended his career in 1977 after playing a few seasons in Divizia B at SC Tulcea.

== International career ==
Tufan played two games for Romania, both under coach Angelo Niculescu, making his debut on 14 May 1969 in a 1–0 away victory against Switzerland in the 1970 World Cup qualifiers. His second game for the national team was a 1–1 friendly draw against Yugoslavia.

Tufan was selected by Niculescu to be part of Romania's squad for the 1970 World Cup, but did not play there. For the participation in that tournament he was decorated by President of Romania Traian Băsescu on 25 March 2008 with the Ordinul "Meritul Sportiv" – (The Medal "The Sportive Merit") class III.

== Managerial career ==
After he ended his playing career, Tufan had a short managerial career at Granitul Babadag, helping the club earn promotion to Divizia C.

== Personal life ==
Tufan's son, Sorin, was also a footballer who played in Divizia A for Farul Constanța and Steaua București.
