= Andrei Grigoraș =

Romanian futsal player

Personal information
- Full name: Andrei Grigoraș
- Date of birth: 15 May 1989 (age 37)
- Place of birth: Romania
- Position: Goalkeeper

Team information
- Current team: Sfântu Gheorghe

International career
Years	Team	Apps	(Gls)
- Romania

Andrei Grigoraș (born 15 May 1989 ), is a Romanian futsal player who plays for Sfântu Gheorghe and the Romanian national futsal team.
