= Laurențiu Florea =

Romanian footballer

Personal information
- Date of birth: 20 February 1981 (age 45)
- Place of birth: Medgidia, Romania
- Height: 1.80 m (5 ft 11 in)
- Position: Defender

Team information
- Current team: Callatis Mangalia

Senior career*
Years	Team	Apps	(Gls)
2002–2003	CSM Medgidia	26	(1)
2003–2008	Farul Constanța	99	(2)
2008–2009	Astra Giurgiu		
2011–2012	CSMS Iași		
2013–	Callatis Mangalia		

International career^{‡}
2001–2002	Romania U-21	11	(2)
- * Club domestic league appearances and goals as of 15:20, 8 May 2016 (UTC) ‡ National team caps and goals as of 15:20, 8 May 2016 (UTC)

Laurențiu Florea (born 20 February 1981 in Medgidia, Constanța County) is a Romanian professional footballer. He currently plays for Callatis Mangalia.
