= Răzvan Farmache =

Romanian footballer and manager

Personal information
- Full name: Răzvan Ștefănel Farmache
- Date of birth: 1 November 1978 (age 48)
- Place of birth: Urziceni, Romania
- Height: 1.78 m (5 ft 10 in)
- Position: Right-back

Team information
- Current team: FC Urziceni (player-manager)

Senior career*
Years	Team	Apps	(Gls)
1998–2000	Rocar București	3	(1)
2000–2003	Sportul Studențesc	64	(0)
2003–2008	Farul Constanța	103	(1)
2009–2012	Sportul Studențesc	58	(0)
2012–2013	Ștefănești	10	(1)
2016–2017	FC Urziceni	17	(9)
Total		255	(12)

Managerial career
- 2013–2014: FC Juniorul (assistant)
- 2016–: FC Urziceni
- * Club domestic league appearances and goals as of 17 July 2018

Răzvan Ștefănel Farmache (born 1 November 1978) is a Romanian footballer. He is a player-manager for Liga IV side FC Urziceni. In his career Farmache played for other three clubs: Rocar București, Sportul Studențesc and Farul Constanța.

Farmache was included in the team of players for Armânamea, a football team of Aromanians from Romania, at the Europeada 2024 tournament for indigenous and national minorities in Europe, having trained the team before the competition.
