= Alexandru Bălțoi =

Romanian footballer

Personal information
- Date of birth: 21 June 1982 (age 44)
- Place of birth: Bucharest, Romania
- Height: 1.81 m (5 ft 11 in)
- Position: Forward

Senior career*
Years	Team	Apps	(Gls)
1999–2006	Dinamo București	36	(8)
2000–2002	→ Poiana Câmpina (loan)	47	(22)
2002–2004	→ Farul Constanța (loan)	47	(13)
2004–2005	→ Dinamo II București (loan)	12	(4)
2005–2006	→ Oțelul Galați (loan)	17	(6)
2007	Argeș Pitești	11	(1)
2007–2008	UTA Arad	26	(6)
2008–2009	Brașov	2	(0)
2009–2010	Unirea Alba Iulia	9	(0)
2010	Ceahlăul Piatra Neamț	7	(2)
2011	Concordia Chiajna	15	(3)
2012	CSCA–Rapid Chișinău	16	(2)
2012–2013	CF Brăila	17	(6)
2013–2014	FC Clinceni	13	(1)
2014–2015	Sporting Turnu Măgurele	?	(?)
2015–2017	Unirea Dej	?	(?)
2017	Atletico Vaslui	?	(?)
Total		275+	(74+)

International career
2002–2003	Romania U-21	4	(0)

Managerial career
- 2017: Atletico Vaslui (assistant)
Medal record
Dinamo București
Winner	Divizia A	1999–00
Winner	Divizia A	2001–02
Runner-up	Divizia A	2004–05
Winner	Romanian Cup	2000
Winner	Romanian Cup	2005
Winner	Romanian Supercup	2005
Concordia Chiajna
Runner-up	Liga II	2011–12
- * Club domestic league appearances and goals as of 5 July 2017

Alexandru "Alex" Bălțoi (born 21 June 1982) is a Romanian former footballer who played as a forward. Bălțoi made his Liga I debut on 4 March 2000 for Dinamo București, in a 1–0 victory against Extensiv Craiova. In his career Alex played for various Romanian clubs, among others: Dinamo București, Farul Constanța, Oțelul Galați, Argeș Pitești, UTA Arad, Brașov or Ceahlăul Piatra Neamț. He also played for a short period in Moldova, for CSCA–Rapid Chișinău. Bălțoi retired in 2017, his last club was Liga III side Atletico Vaslui, where he was also the assistant manager, for a short time.

== Trivia ==
In July 2017 Bălțoi was suspended by the Romanian Football Federation for match fixing attempt, after he sent a message to coach Alin Pânzaru (Dacia Unirea Brăila), suggesting that Brăila should lose at Academica Clinceni. Later, he would say: "That's a stupidity, an aberration. I made an April 1 joke with Alin Pânzaru (coach from Dacia Unirea Brăila). I told him to do this thing, but it was a joke. He took it seriously and went with the SMS to the Federation. I'm innocent. Anyway, I retired from football. Now I do some kinetotherapist classes."

== Honours ==
Dinamo București

- Romanian League Championship: 1999–00, 2001–02
- Romanian Cup: 1999–00, 2004–05
- Romanian Super Cup: 2005
