= Adrian Senin =

Romanian footballer

Personal information
- Date of birth: 27 August 1979 (age 47)
- Place of birth: Constanța, Romania
- Height: 1.71 m (5 ft 7 in)
- Position: Defender

Team information
- Current team: Focșani (assistant)

Senior career*
Years	Team	Apps	(Gls)
1997–1998	Farul Constanța	2	(0)
1998–2000	Callatis Mangalia	10	(0)
2000–2007	Farul Constanța	131	(8)
2007–2009	FC Brașov	48	(7)
2010	Delta Tulcea	25	(4)
2011–2012	Unirea Urziceni	10	(0)
Total		226	(19)

Managerial career
- 2015–2016: Academica Clinceni (assistant)
- 2017–2018: Voința Turnu Măgurele (assistant)
- 2018–2019: Astra II
- 2021–2022: Politehnica Iași (assistant)
- 2023–: Focșani (assistant)
- * Club domestic league appearances and goals as of 10:45, 9 January 2024 (UTC)

Adrian Senin (born 27 August 1979) is a Romanian former professional football player.

While playing for FC Farul Constanța, Senin was involved in a serious automobile accident in August 2005.
