= Liviu Mihai =

Romanian footballer

Personal information
- Date of birth: 17 May 1977 (age 49)
- Place of birth: Cluj-Napoca, Romania
- Height: 1.81 m (5 ft 11 1/2 in)
- Position: Striker

Senior career*
Years	Team	Apps	(Gls)
1995–1999	Universitatea Cluj	83	(7)
2000	Național București	0	(0)
2000–2006	Farul Constanţa	147	(37)
2007–2008	Pandurii Târgu Jiu	30	(4)
2009	CSM Râmnicu Vâlcea	0	(0)
Total		260	(48)
- * Club domestic league appearances and goals

Liviu Mihai (born 17 May 1977) is a retired Romanian professional football player who played as a striker mainly for Liga I side Farul Constanța.
