= Mihai Baicu =

Romanian footballer

Personal information
- Date of birth: 21 September 1975
- Place of birth: Bucharest, Romania
- Date of death: 6 July 2009 (aged 33)
- Place of death: Bucharest, Romania
- Height: 1.86 m (6 ft 1 in)
- Position: Midfielder

Senior career*
Years	Team	Apps	(Gls)
1994–1995	Național București	4	(0)
1995	→ Brăila (loan)	12	(4)
1995–1996	Gloria IRIS Coreşti	?	(?)
1996	Argeș Pitești	2	(0)
1996	Târgoviște	8	(0)
1996–2000	Foresta Suceava	88	(36)
2000–2003	Cittadella	65	(8)
2003	Cremonese	7	(0)
2003–2004	Brașov	17	(6)
2004	Ghimbav	?	(?)
2004–2006	Farul Constanța	25	(2)
2006	Ceahlăul Piatra Neamț	16	(0)
Total		172	(54)
- * Club domestic league appearances and goals

Mihai Baicu (21 September 1975 – 6 July 2009) was a Romanian professional footballer who played as a midfielder for Național București, Brăila, Gloria IRIS Corești, Argeș Pitești, Târgoviște, Foresta Suceava, Cittadella, Cremonese, Brașov, FC Ghimbav, Farul Constanța, and Ceahlăul Piatra Neamț. Baicu died in Bucharest on 6 July 2009, at the age of 33, and was buried in the city's Ghencea Cemetery.
