= Cotroceni Stadium =

Football venue in Bucharest, Romania

Coordinates: 44.427666°N 26.0749555°E

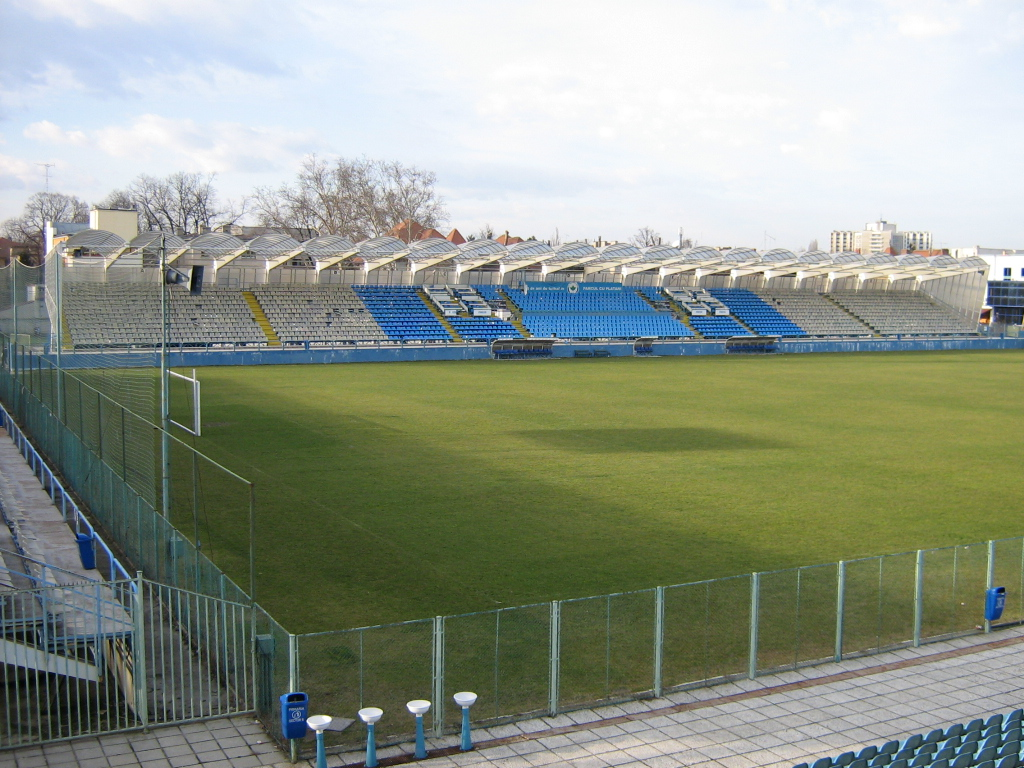
- The venue in 2007
- Interactive map of Cotroceni Stadium
- Location: Bucharest, Romania
- Owner: BNR
- Capacity: 14,542
- Surface: Grass

Construction
- Opened: 1995

Tenant
- Progresul București (1995–2008)

The Cotroceni Stadium is a football stadium in Bucharest, Romania. It holds 14,542 people. The venue was the home ground of Progresul București.

The stadium was built in 1995, being the first stadium built, after the fall of Communism in Romania in 1989.

It was the host for the Romanian Cup Final in 2004 and 2005. Also an international rugby union match between France and Romania was played on June 17, 2006, during the 2006 France rugby union tour.

The musical artists Kylie Minogue, Enrique Iglesias, RBD, Deep Purple, Metallica and Iron Maiden have all performed at the stadium.

== Romania national football team ==
The following national team matches were held in the stadium.

| # | Date | Score | Opponent | Competition |
|---|---|---|---|---|
| 1. | 16 August 2000 | 1–1 | Poland | Friendly match |
