= FCV Farul Constanța =

Association football club in Constanța

Farul Constanța
- Full name: FCV Farul Constanța SA
- Nicknames: Marinarii (The Sailors); Rechinii (The Sharks); Alb-albaștrii (The White and Blues); Constănțenii (The People from Constanța); Echipa litoralului (Seaside team)
- Short name: Farul
- Founded: 12 November 1920; 106 years ago as SPM Constanța
- Ground: Central
- Capacity: 4,554
- Owners: Gheorghe Popescu (70%); Gheorghe Hagi (10%); Rivaldo (10%); Ciprian Marica (10%)
- President: Gheorghe Popescu
- Head coach: Ioan Sabău
- League: Liga I
- 2025–26: Liga I, 13th of 16
- Website: farulconstanta.com
Home colours	Away colours	Third colours

FCV Farul Constanța (Romanian pronunciation: [ˈfarul konˈstantsa]), commonly known as Farul Constanța or simply Farul, is a Romanian professional football club based in Constanța, Constanța County, that competes in the Liga I, the top tier of the Romanian league system. Farul means "the Lighthouse" in Romanian, referring to the city's location on the Black Sea coast.

Founded in 1920 as SPM Constanța, the club spent over 40 seasons in the top flight before merging with Viitorul Constanța in 2021. Before the merger, Farul's best league finishes were three fourth-place results. Farul won its first Liga I title in the 2022–23 season, or its second if Viitorul's honours are included. (Note: In June 2021, Viitorul Constanța changed its corporate name to FCV Farul Constanța SA and adopted the Farul name, crest, and colours. Gheorghe Hagi, who controlled Viitorul, stated that the new club would retain Viitorul's honours. The merger and the attribution of Viitorul's honours to Farul have since been disputed.)

The club is known for its academy, established by Gheorghe Hagi, a native of Constanța County. Hagi also served as the club's controlling shareholder and head coach, and is the joint all-time leading goalscorer for the Romania national team.

Farul traditionally played its home matches at Farul Stadium, but currently uses the smaller Viitorul Stadium in Ovidiu until a new stadium is built.

== History ==
=== Early years (1920–1949) ===
The club was founded in 1920 as SPM Constanța (Serviciul Porturi Maritime – Maritime Port Services) and played under this name until 1946, when it was renamed PCA Constanța (Porturi Comunicații Ape – Ports Marine Communication).

=== Ascent (1949–1960) ===
The modern history of the football club from Constanța began in 1949, when the city's two teams (Dezrobirea Constanța and PCA Constanța) merged to form Locomotiva PCA. The new club was registered for the Divizia B play-off with four other regional champions: Metalul 1 Mai Ploiești, Dinamo Oltenița, Progresul CPCS București and Bucegi Câmpulung Pitești. "Constănțenii" finished first in the group, and were promoted to the second league.

In 1953, Locomotiva PCA Constanța was renamed Locomotiva Constanța. A year later, at the end of the 1954 season, Locomotiva Constanța received its first promotion to Divizia A. The team was ranked first in the third series of Divizia B, with three points more than second-place Dinamo Bacău. After the last game, an away 1–0 win against Dinamo Bârlad, the players were welcomed at Constanța's old train station by a large crowd which had come to celebrate the promotion. The team consisted of Nebela, Doicescu, Zlotea, Mark, Tatomir, Jarnea (Bedivan, Manta), Vultur, Neli Ispas, Gogu Cojocaru, Sever, Cristof, Bobi Georgescu, Gigi Datcu, Linzoiu, Keszkei, coached by Ion Troancă.

Period	Name
1920–1946	SPM Constanța
1946–1949	PCA Constanța
1949–1953	Locomotiva PCA Constanța
1953–1958	Locomotiva Constanța
1958–1972	Farul Constanța
1972–1988	FC Constanța
1988–present	Farul Constanța

In the spring of 1955, Locomotiva began their first season in the first league. The team was strengthened with players from Politehnica Timișoara, CFR București and Flamura Roșie Arad, and had a new coach: Eugen Mladin. The first match of "the Sailors" was played in Bucharest against future champion Dinamo București. Gogu Cojocaru scored first but the match was lost, 4–1. At the end of the season, Locomotiva finished 12th out of 13 teams and was relegated to Divizia B. During the season, Farul Stadium (1 Mai Stadium at the time) opened. Its debut match, on 23 March 1955, was a fourth-round league game between Locomotiva and defending champions Flamura Roșie Arad. Locomotiva won, 1–0, with a 40-meter goal by Manole.

Locomotiva finished the 1956 Divizia B season in sixth place, and finished third in 1957. The return to an autumn-spring format at the beginning of the 1957–58 season and the renaming of the team to Farul Constanța had brought good luck to the Sailors, who won the second league and returned to the first league of Romanian football. After a tough first season in which the club barely avoided relegation, Farul had their best season to date and finished fourth in 1959–60. The team consisted of players Horia Ghibănescu, Nicolae Botescu, Grigore Ciuncan, Lucrețiu Florescu, Gheorghe Corneanu, Gheorghe Toma, Petre Comăniță, Mircea Bibere, Eugen Pană, Gheorghe Datcu, Vasile Stancu, Constantin Moroianu, Ion Ciosescu, Paul Niculescu, Dumitru Sever, Iacob Olaru and Ștefan Nunu; head coach Iosif Lengheriu, and president Foti Foti.

=== Domestic top flight and European competition debut (1960–1967) ===
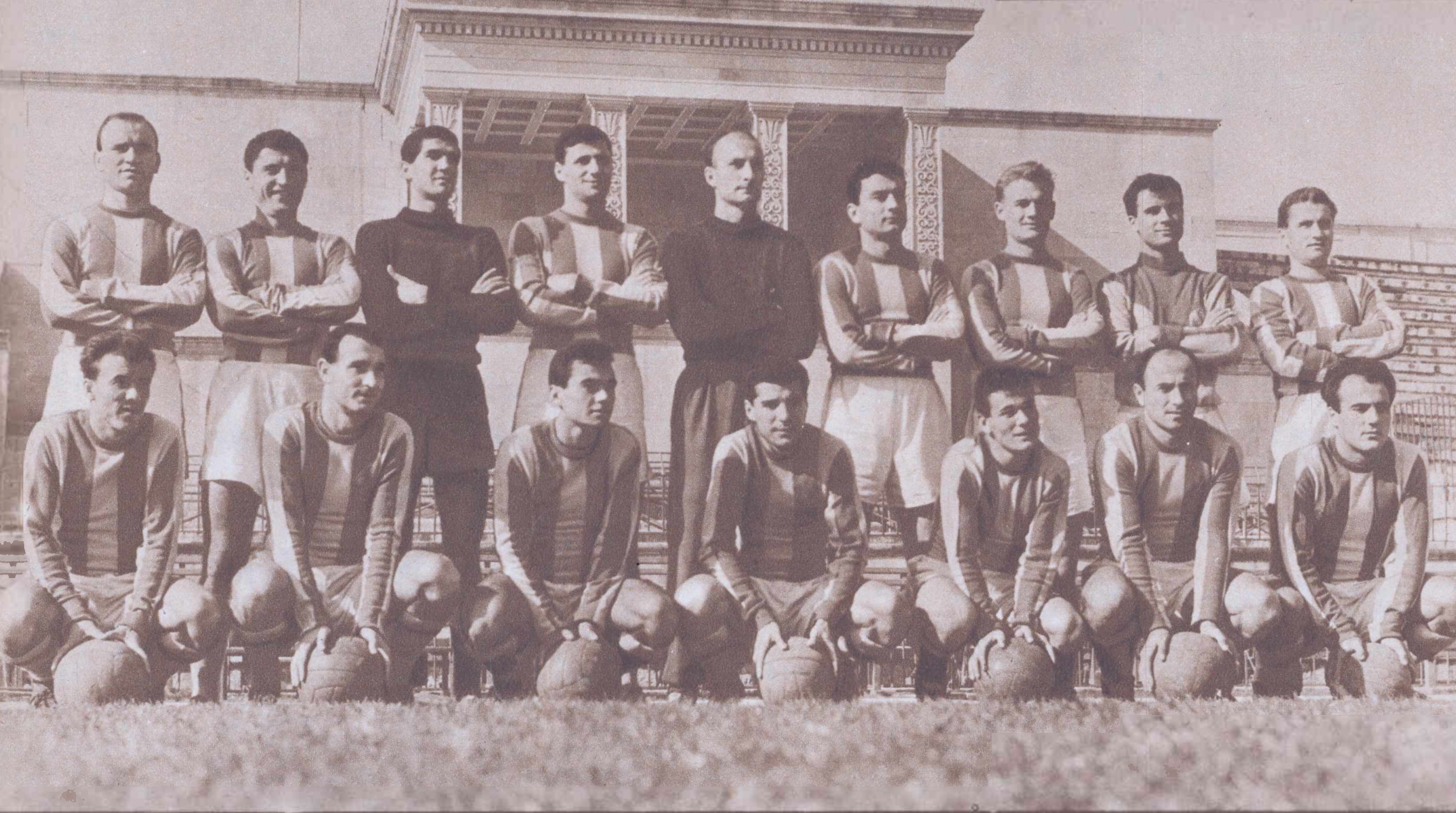
The Farul squad in 1963

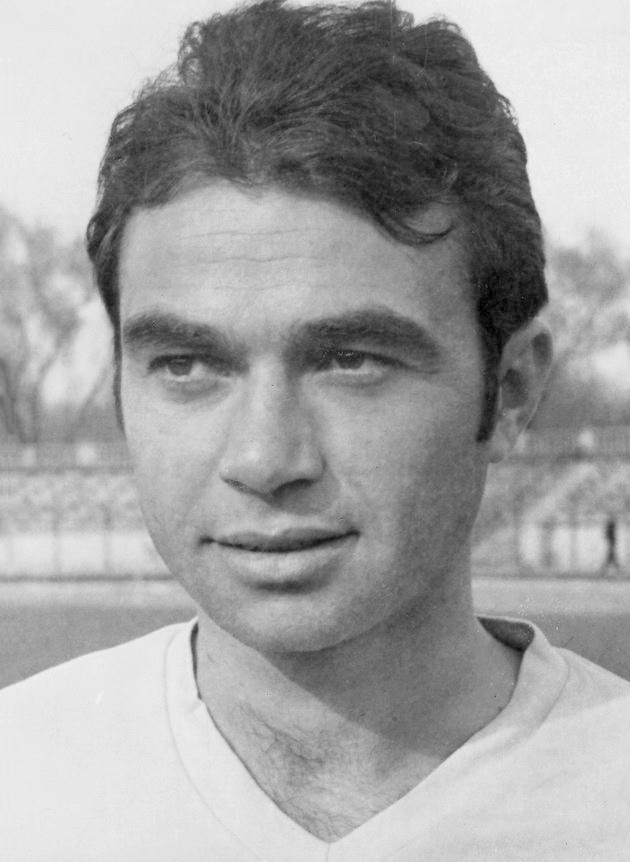
Marin Tufan, Farul's all-time top goal scorer

The 1960s began with the Sharks in the first football league. Due to the failure of newcomers Brânzei, Stancu and Vasilescu to mesh with the team, at the end of the 1960–61 season Farul finished 13th and was relegated with CSMS Iași and Corvinul Hunedoara. Motivated by their presence in the first league, the Constanțenii did not stay long in Divizia B; at the end of the 1961–62 season, they were promoted back to the first league after finishing first. That season, Farul also received its first national football title by winning the U-19 championship. The following year, the Sailors ended the first part of the season as leaders of the Divizia A. They did less well during the second part, and ranked fifth at the end of the season. During the 1962–63 season, the offensive trio of Bükössy-Ciosescu-Dinulescu scored 48 goals. Farul Constanța won its second consecutive title in the U-19 league, with students of Gheorghe Smărăndescu defeating Dinamo București 2–1 in the final.

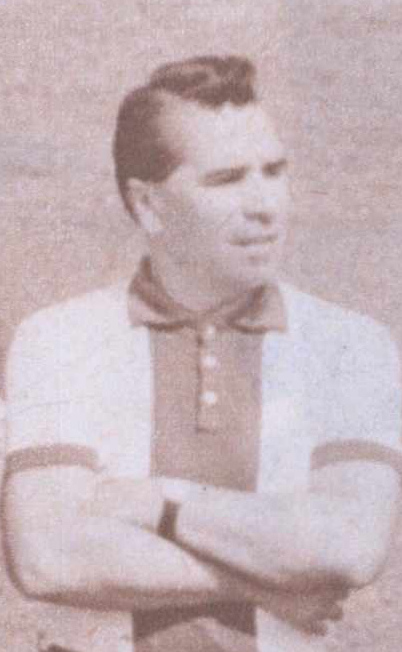
Virgil Mărdărescu coached the club from 1965 to 1968

The next three seasons started well for Farul, but they finished in the middle of the pack. In 1963–64, they finished eighth after occupying third place at the end of the first half; all-time goal-scorer Marin Tufan scored 62 goals. The following year, the Sailors finished only one point above first-relegated team Minerul Baia Mare. In the 1965–66 season, Farul finished ninth out of 14 teams. Their qualification for the 1964–66 Balkans Cup was their first participation in European competitions; on 28 April 1965, Farul drew away with Spartak Plovdiv 1–1. They won 1–0 in Constanța two weeks later for their first European victory. In the next game, the white-and-blues first defeated Vardar 4–0 in Skopje and 1–0 in a second match. Their meeting with the Greek side Olympiacos was divided; the Greeks won 1–0 at Piraeus, and Farul won a forfeit in Constanța for first place in Group A. The final of the competition was Romanian; Farul met Rapid București, but lost on aggregate after a 3–3 draw in Bucharest and a 0–2 loss in Constanța. The team did well in the Romanian Cup, where the Sharks were eliminated in the semi-finals by UTA Arad (2–3).

In the 1966–67 season, Farul finished fourth in Divizia A. The squad consisted of Iuliu Uțu, Constantin Tâlvescu, Constantin Manciu, Mircea Georgescu, Constantin Koszka, Martin Graef, Suliman Etem, Cicerone Manolache, Constantin Pleșa, Dumitru Antonescu, Ilie Ologu, Marin Tufan, Constantin Iancu, Tiberiu Kallo, Ion Zamfir, Dumitru Caraman, Iosif Bükössy, Constantin Mareș, Vasile Dumbravă; head coach Virgil Mărdărescu, and president Foti Foti. At the end of the season, Farul played six games in its first international tournament in Lebanon, Kuwait and Syria.

=== Between success and mediocrity (1967–1988) ===
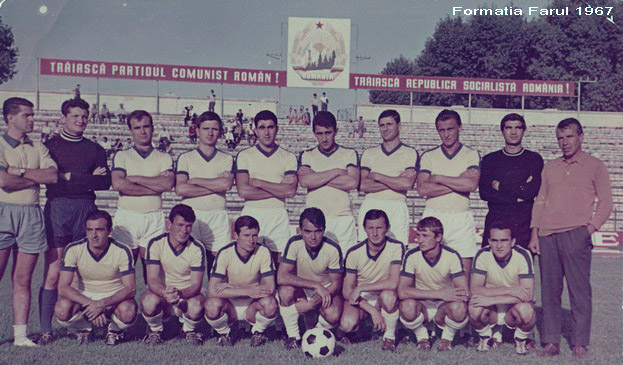
Farul Constanța's 1967–68 squad, which played in the Balkans Cup

Farul competed in the 1966–67 Balkans Cup, and were drawn in a group against AEK Athens (third place in the Alpha Ethniki), Lokomotiv Sofia (eighth place in the Bulgarian First League) and Vardar (10th place in the Yugoslav First League). The Sailors started with two consecutive wins in Constanța: 4–1 against Lokomotiv Sofia, and 2–0 against Vardar Skopje. They could not replicate their home form in the away matches, however, losing all three: 0–4 against Vardar, 0–3 against AEK Athens, and 1–5 versus Lokomotiv Sofia. They drew 1–1 against AEK in the last group match, and finished the group stage in third place.

The Sharks finished the 1967–68 season in seventh place, and again competed in the Balkans Cup. Their opponents were Beroe Stara Zagora (10th place in the Bulgarian First League), Vllaznia Shkodër (sixth place in the Albanian Superliga) and Gençlerbirliği (sixth place in the Süper Lig). Their results were 3–1 and 2–1 against Gençlerbirliği, two 1–2 losses at Shkodër and Stara Zagora, followed by a 2–1 win against Vllaznia in Constanța and a 1–2 defeat against Beroe. Farul ended the group stage in third place, and did not qualify for the next stage.

During the next two seasons, Farul consolidated its reputation as a difficult team to beat. They finished ninth and reached the semi-finals of the 1968–69 Cupa României at the end of the 1968–69 season. This was followed by sixth place in the league and reaching the quarter-finals of the Cupa României in the 1969–70 season.

The early 1970s transformed Farul to a regular finisher in the middle of the Divizia A standings: 11th in 1970–71 and 1971–72 and eighth in 1972–73. The team was renamed FC Constanța during the summer of 1973, finished fourth at the end of the next season, and qualified for the 1975 Balkans Cup. The format of the competition had changed, and a group consisted of only three teams; Eskişehirspor (fourth in the Süper Lig) and Lokomotiv Sofia (fifth in the Bulgarian First League) were in Constanța's group. The team had one victory (2–1 against Lokomotiv Sofia), one draw (2–2 against Eskişehirspor) and two defeats (1–2 and 0–1 against Eskişehirspor and Lokomotiv), both in away matches.

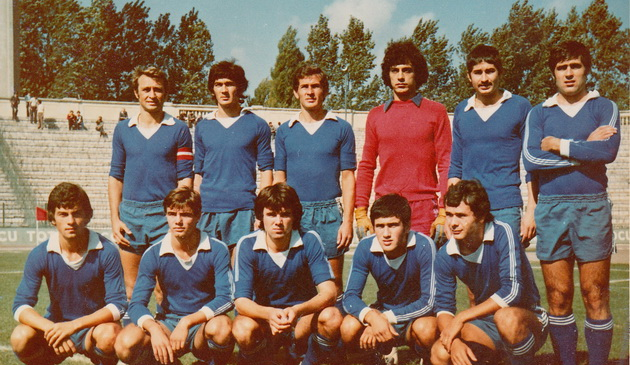
FC Constanța during the 1980s

Between 1974 and 1988 FC Constanța had uneven results, bouncing between the first and the second leagues and far from their results in the second half of the 1960s and the first half of the 1970s. After two 10th-place finishes in 1974–75 and 1975–76, FC Constanța barely avoided relegation in 1976–77. They were relegated at the end of the following season after finishing 16th out of 18 teams. Back in Divizia B after 16 years, Constanța finished fourth in the first season and second at the end of 1979–80, far behind leader Brașov. The Sailors were promoted to the first league at the end of the 1980–81 season. The team, led by Emanoil Hașoti and his assistant Petre Comăniță, included Costaș, Stancu, Borali, Antonescu, Nistor, Caramalău, Turcu, Purcărea, Gache, Drogeanu, Livciuc, Ancuța, Buduru, Peniu, Mărculescu, Petcu, I. Moldovan, and Ștefanovici. However, another poor season followed, ending with a 14th-place finish in the 1981–82 Divizia A and relegation at the end of the 1982–83 season. Four Divizia B seasons followed with mediocre results: fifth in 1983–84 and fourth in 1984–85, 1985–86 and 1986–87. The club was promoted to Divizia A at the end of the 1987–88 season, and was renamed Farul Constanța during the summer of 1988. Despite weaker results, the team contributed Gheorghe Hagi, Constantin Gache, Ștefan Petcu, Ion Moldovan, and others to Romanian football.

=== From UEFA Intertoto to Divizia B (1988–2001) ===
Chart showing the progress of Farul's league finishes from 1946 until present.

The late 1980s and early 1990s found Farul in Divizia A with unimpressive results: ninth place in 1988–89, 10th in 1989–90 and 1990–91, 13th in 1991–92, ninth in 1992–93 and sixth in 1993–94. Although the team finished 11th in the 1994–95 season, Farul made its debut in the 1995 UEFA Intertoto Cup. Its five-team group also consisted of Cannes (ninth place in Ligue 1), Dnepr Mogilev (fifth in the Belarusian Premier League), Bečej (fourth in the First League of Serbia and Montenegro) and Pogoń Szczecin (eighth in the Ekstraklasa). Farul unexpectedly won the group with three victories, one draw and no defeats. The next draw brought Farul Heerenveen, ninth in the Eredivisie the previous season. The match was played in the Netherlands on 29 July 1995 at the 20,000-seat Abe Lenstra Stadion before 5,000 spectators. It was dominated by the Dutch side, which included a young Jon Dahl Tomasson. Farul coach Florin Marin fielded Cristian Munteanu – Stelian Carabaș, Daniel Ghișan, Marian Dinu (C), Mihai Matei, Ștefan Nanu – Gheorghe Barbu, Dănuț Moisescu, Gheorghe Ciurea – Mugurel Cornățeanu, and Laurențiu Zadea. In the 19-minute Erik Regtop opened the score in the 19th minute, and increased it 16 minutes later. After the break, Jon Dahl Tomasson (48') and Romeo Wounden (71') made the final score 4–0. The Sailors continued their good form the following season into the Romanian Cup, where they were eliminated in the quarter-finals.

After the UEFA Intertoto Cup, Farul returned to its middle-table results: eighth in 1995–96, 10th in 1996–97, and 12th in 1997–98 and 1998–99. The most notable performance of these seasons was the 1,000th match played by Farul in the top flight of the Romanian football during the 1998–99 season. Financial problems and lack of local municipal interest left their mark on the team in 1999–2000, after which the Sharks were relegated to Divizia B. Before the last match, the Sailors were in 13th position; they then lost 1–2 against FC Onești and finished 15th, relegated after 12 years on the first stage of Romanian football.

Motivated to return to the first stage, the Constănțenii and Sportul Studențesc dominated Divizia B and finished the 2000–01 season in second place with 74 points. This assured them a promotion-relegation play-off against FCM Bacău, 14th in Divizia A. The two clubs shared victories, (2–1 and 1–2), and Farul was promoted after penalty shoot-outs. The return to the top flight was also marked by the beginning of the ownership era at Constanța. In the Socialist Republic of Romania, all football clubs were publicly owned. After the Romanian Revolution, some clubs were publicly owned and others were privately owned. During the 1990s and early 2000s, most Romanian football clubs were owned by single individuals. Gheorghe Bosânceanu, owner of the Constanța Shipyard, bought Farul.

=== Decline into bankruptcy (2001–2016) ===
Despite being in a better financial situation, the Sailors finished 14th in the 2001–02 season and had to play a promotion-relegation playoff. Farul met FC Baia Mare and defeated them 1–0 in Constanța. A 0–0 draw at Baia Mare meant that the white-and-blues remained in Divizia A.

The club finished 10th in 2002–03, ninth in 2003–04 and fifth in 2004–05, behind Steaua București, Dinamo București, Rapid București and Național București. That season, the Sharks played in the Cupa României final. The 67th final of the Cupa României was played at Cotroceni Stadium against Dinamo București before 15,000 spectators, about 6,000 of whom were from Constanța. The referee was Laurent Duhamel of France, and Petre Grigoraș fielded George Curcă (C) – Răzvan Farmache, Ion Barbu, Cristian Șchiopu, Cosmin Pașcovici (Mihai Baicu in the 75th minute) – Florin Lungu, Adrian Senin, Dinu Todoran (Laurențiu Florea in the 85th minute) Mihai Guriță, Vasilică Cristocea (Iulian Apostol in the 10th minute) – Liviu Mihai. Dinamo won, 1–0, on a goal by Ștefan Grigorie in the sixth minute.

Farul continued its good form during the next season, when it reached the semi-finals of the Romanian Cup before it was eliminated by Național București 2–4 on aggregate. The Sailors finished seventh in Divizia A and played in the 2006 UEFA Intertoto Cup, where they eliminated Pobeda 4–2 on aggregate and Lokomotiv Plovdiv 3–2 on aggregate. In the cup final, Farul met Auxerre (sixth in Ligue 1). The French team participated in the competition due to the withdrawal of the Italian Palermo side because of the 2006 Italian football scandal. Farul lost 2–4 on aggregate, and missed its first chance to participate in the UEFA Cup. That season, despite over €2 million promised by owner Gheorghe Bosânceanu, after the Auxerre match, Farul remained at the bottom of the rankings for the whole season and ended 2006–07 in 14th place.

The 2007–08 season is considered one of Liga I's best post-Revolution seasons, but Farul fared poorly. The constănțenii were last in the league for three weeks before saving themselves from relegation and finishing 13th. The next season continued the decline and, after almost 10 years in the top flight, Farul was again relegated to the second league. The Sharks' last match in the first division was an 0–6 loss to Otopeni.

The relegation inspired eight-year owner Gheorghe Bosânceanu to sell the club to former Rocar București and Știința Bacău owner Giani Nedelcu; both clubs went bankrupt under his tenure. In 2009–10, Farul finished in eighth place. The next season was full of emotion, with the club receiving its Liga II license late because of growing financial problems and finishing 13th. The Sharks finished eighth in 2011–12, far from promotion.

Liga III began to feel possible during the 2012–13 season. FCM Bacău, Astra II Giurgiu and Callatis Mangalia withdrew from Liga II, and Dinamo II București and Chindia Târgoviște were relegated; Farul barely escaped. In 2013–14, Liga II changed its format to a play-off / play-out system; the Sailors finished the regular season in 11th place, in the play-out zone, but again eluded relegation. Farul again played in the 2014–15 play-out, where it finished fourth and was saved from relegation. In 2015–16, Farul finished the regular season in fourth place and entered the play-off group. The Sharks earned 29 points and finished fifth, giving supporters hope. However, Farul withdrew from the second league amid growing financial problems before the start of the 2016–17 season. Although Nedelcu hoped to a license for the third league, the FRF Licensing Commission refused because of the threat of bankruptcy. Farul Constanța was declared bankrupt on 22 September 2016, after 67 years representing the city of Constanța in Liga I, Liga II, the Cupa României, the UEFA Intertoto Cup and the Balkans Cup.

=== Rebirth, merger with Viitorul and return of Hagi (2016–present) ===
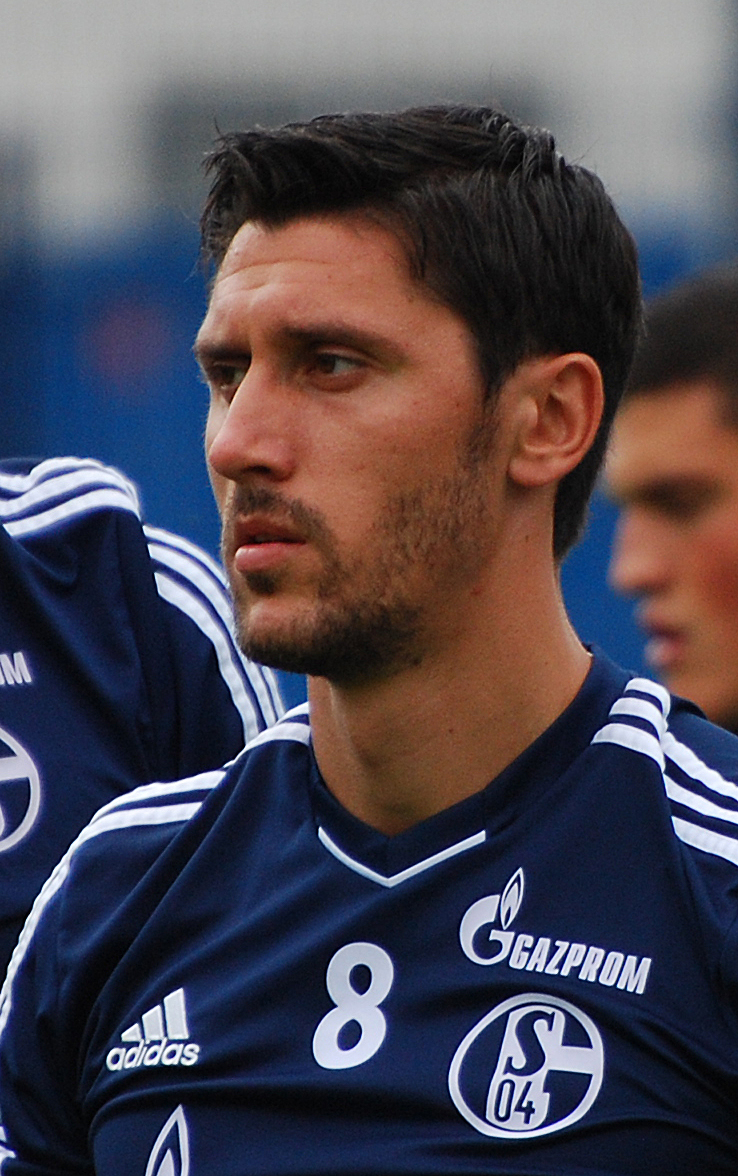
Ciprian Marica, main shareholder at Farul before the merger

When it became clear that bankruptcy was unavoidable, a group of Farul supporters organized as the Farul Supporters Association and moved quickly to continue the tradition of Farul Constanța. They founded Supporter Spirit Club Farul Constanța on 8 August 2016 to assure Farul's football continuity and avoid missed seasons.

The new club retained Farul's white-and-blue colors and adopted its old logo with Constanța's lighthouse, the Black Sea and a seagull in flight. The team was enrolled in the Constanța County series of Liga IV in time for the 2016–17 season. Farul won their series, recording 32 victories in 34 games and scored 135 goals while allowing 14. The Sailors then won the promotion play-off 8–2 on aggregate against Tulcea County champions Pescărușul Sarichioi, and were promoted to Liga III. In the summer of 2017, Petre Grigoraș was named the new coach and important players were transferred. Farul was promoted at the end of the 2017–18 season after a tough fight against Progresul Spartac București, with whom they were tied until the season's final matches.

In the summer of 2018, former Romanian international footballer Ciprian Marica bought the Farul Constanța brand for €49,150 (228,892 RON). The move sparked a brief conflict between Marica and Farul supporters, despite Marica's claim to have attempted a dialogue with SSC Farul's leadership; Marica formed a new team, FC Farul Constanța, and enrolled it in Liga IV. Marica and the supporters reached an agreement, with the ex-footballer announcing that he would take over SSC Farul; the Liga IV team would be the club's reserve team, and the brand would be transferred to the Liga II side. Marica announced his plans for the club in his first press conference as Farul's owner, including promotion back to Liga I by 2020 and slowly building a team for the European competitions and league title.

On 21 June 2021, Marica, Gheorghe Hagi (Viitorul Constanța owner and founder), and Gheorghe Popescu (Viitorul Constanța chairman) announced the merger of their two clubs at a press conference. Viitorul changed its corporate name to FCV Farul Constanța SA and adopted the Farul name, crest, and colours, while the resulting club continued in Liga I. Farul would continue to play its home matches at Viitorul Stadium while the Farul Stadium underwent renovation.

Farul topped the 2022–23 SuperLiga standings, one point above reigning champions CFR Cluj. The club's march towards their first league title experienced a setback after a 1–2 defeat loss to FCSB on match day four, reducing the gap between the teams to two points. A 1–0 victory by CFR ended Cluj's five-championship run, turning the league into a two-horse race between Farul and FCSB. Farul had further setbacks after 1–1 draws with Sepsi OSK and Universitatea Craiova, despite a record 7–2 win over Rapid București between them, closing the gap between Farul and FCSB to one point. Farul won their first league title (or its second if Viitorul's honours are included) with a 3–2 win against FCSB, coming back from 0–2.

== Youth program ==
As the senior teams of Farul and Viitorul merged in 2021, the Farul Constanța Academy subsequently merged with Gheorghe Hagi Football Academy. Young players aged between 8 and 13 are now part of Gheorghe Hagi Academy, while players over 13 are part of Farul Constanța Academy. Viitorul's academy was well known for developing young players in Romania and having some of the best facilities in the country.

== Grounds ==
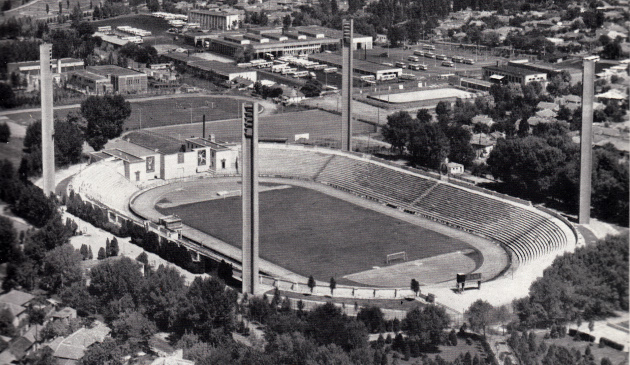
Farul Stadium in the 1980s.

The club used to play its home matches on Stadionul Farul in Constanța. Originally known as Stadionul 1 Mai, the stadium was opened in 1955 and had the shape of the letter "U", but subsequently it was expanded with another stand, finally reaching the capacity of 15,520 seats. After the bankruptcy of the club in 2016, the new entity has encountered administrative problems that have prevented the team from playing on the stadium for more than a year and a half. SSC Farul played from 2016 until 14 April 2018 on Stadionul Sparta, from Techirghiol, with a capacity of 1,000 people. Stadionul Farul reached an advanced condition of degradation due to lack of activity, and had to be cleaned and restored as functional by Farul supporters through several volunteer campaigns.

In 1970, Stadionul Farul became the first stadium in Romania to have floodlights installed.

On 21 June 2021, as the merge between Farul and Viitorul was announced, it was also mentioned that Farul will play its home matches on Viitorul Stadium, due to Farul Stadium's advanced state of degradation.

== Support ==
Farul has many supporters in the Dobruja region, and especially in Constanța. Farul supporters are organized in the Farul Supporters Association, and this organization brought the club back to life in 2016 after the bankruptcy of the old entity. The first ultras group, entitled "Ultras Farul '92", appeared in 1992. They were followed in 1996 by "Legiunea Marină", and over time by several other groups, such as: "Aria Ultra'", "Baricada", "Fervent" or "Alcoholics".

=== Rivalries ===
The traditional rivals of "the Sailors" are Rapid București and Dinamo București. Farul also has some local rivalries against teams from nearby cities, such as CS Năvodari, Săgeata Năvodari or Delta Tulcea. However, these are of low intensity.

== Milestones ==
- 1949: Year of establishment after the merger of Dezrobirea and PCA (Porturi Comunicații Ape).
- 1955: First match in Divizia A: Dinamo București 4–1 Farul Constanța
- 1955: Opening of Farul Stadium.
- 1966: Balkans Cup Final: Rapid București – Farul Constanța 3–3, 2–0
- 1995: First participation in the UEFA Intertoto Cup
- 1999: 1000th match in the Divizia A: Foresta Fălticeni 2–0 Farul Constanța
- 2005: 2005 Cupa României Final: Dinamo București 1–0 Farul Constanța
- 2006: UEFA Intertoto Cup Third round: Auxerre – Farul Constanța 4–1, 0–1
- 2021: Fusion with FC Viitorul Constanța
- 2023: First Liga I title won

== Honours ==
=== Domestic ===
==== Leagues ====
- Liga I
  - Winners (2): 2016–17, 2022–23
- Divizia B / Liga II
  - Winners (5): 1954, 1957–58, 1961–62, 1980–81, 1987–88
  - Runners-up (3): 1979–80, 2000–01, 2011–12
- Liga III
  - Winners (2): 2009–10, 2017–18
- Liga IV – Constanța County
  - Winners (1): 2016–17

==== Cups ====
- Cupa României
  - Winners (1): 2018–19
  - Runners-up (1): 2004–05
- Supercupa României
  - Winners (1): 2019
  - Runners-up (2): 2017, 2023

=== European ===
- UEFA Intertoto Cup
  - Runners-up (1): 2006
  - Round of 16 (1): 1995
- Balkans Cup
  - Runners-up (1): 1964–66

== Players ==
=== First-team squad ===
As of 26 October 2026

Note: Flags indicate national team as defined under FIFA eligibility rules; some limited exceptions apply. Players may hold more than one non-FIFA nationality.

No.	Pos.	Nation	Player
1	GK	ROU	Alexandru Buzbuchi (3rd captain)
2	DF	ROU	David Maftei
3	DF	ROU	Valentin Țicu
4	DF	BRA	Gustavo Marins
5	DF	FRA	Nabil Aberdin (on loan from Sochi)
6	MF	ROU	Victor Dican
7	FW	ROU	Denis Alibec (Vice-captain)
8	MF	ROU	Ionuț Vînă
9	FW	KOS	Muhamet Hyseni (on loan from Horsens)
10	MF	FRA	Eddy Sylvestre
11	DF	ROU	Cristian Ganea
12	GK	ROU	Rafael Munteanu
13	DF	ROU	Ionuț Cercel (on loan from FCSB)
16	FW	ROU	Antonio Minescu
17	DF	ROU	Ionuț Larie (Captain)
19	FW	COD	Yann Kitala
20	MF	ROU	Eduard Radaslavescu

No.	Pos.	Nation	Player
21	DF	FRA	Lucas Pellegrini
22	DF	ROU	Dan Sîrbu (4th captain)
23	MF	FRA	Tony Njiké
24	DF	FRA	Sofyane Bouzamoucha
27	DF	BFA	Hassane Traoré
28	FW	ROU	Cristian Sima
29	MF	ROU	Alexandru Goncear
30	FW	ARM	Narek Grigoryan
33	DF	BRA	João Ferreira
70	MF	BEN	Mattéo Ahlinvi
71	MF	ROU	Răzvan Tănasă
77	MF	ROU	Darius Tripon
80	MF	ROU	Nicolas Popescu
88	FW	ROU	David Păcuraru
93	DF	CPV	Steve Furtado
99	MF	ROU	Răzvan Mărincean

=== Dual registration ===
Note: Flags indicate national team as defined under FIFA eligibility rules; some limited exceptions apply. Players may hold more than one non-FIFA nationality.

No.	Pos.	Nation	Player
14	MF	ROU	Ianis Podoleanu (at Metaloglobus București)
18	MF	ROU	Luca Banu (at Metaloglobus București)
81	MF	ROU	Andrei Oancea (at Metaloglobus București)

No.	Pos.	Nation	Player
83	DF	ROU	Alexandru Telehoi (at Metaloglobus București)
91	GK	ROU	David Barbu (at Metaloglobus București)

=== Other players under contract ===
Note: Flags indicate national team as defined under FIFA eligibility rules; some limited exceptions apply. Players may hold more than one non-FIFA nationality.

No.	Pos.	Nation	Player
25	FW	SVK	Jakub Vojtuš
50	MF	POR	André Seruca

No.	Pos.	Nation	Player
—	DF	POR	Fabinho

=== Out on loan ===
Note: Flags indicate national team as defined under FIFA eligibility rules; some limited exceptions apply. Players may hold more than one non-FIFA nationality.

No.	Pos.	Nation	Player
16	FW	ROU	Nicolas Constantinescu (at Metaloglobus București until 30 June 2027)
—	GK	ROU	Valentin Frățilă (at SCM Râmnicu Vâlcea until 30 June 2027)
—	DF	ROU	Ricardo Căldăraru (at Metalul Buzău until 30 June 2027)
—	DF	ROU	Ștefan Duțu (at Popești-Leordeni until 30 June 2027)
—	DF	ROU	Costyn Gheorghe (at Gloria Bistrița until 30 June 2027)

No.	Pos.	Nation	Player
—	MF	ROU	Dan Nechifor (at Pașcani until 30 June 2027)
—	MF	ROU	David Pătru (at CSL Ștefănești until 30 June 2027)
—	MF	ROU	Eric Somandru (at Tunari until 30 June 2027)
—	FW	ROU	Matei Berchez (at Bihor Oradea until 30 June 2027)
—	FW	ROU	Ionuț Cojocaru (at Sliema Wanderers until 30 June 2027)

== Club officials ==
=== Board of directors ===
Role	Name
Owners	(Romania) Gheorghe Popescu (70%) (Romania) Gheorghe Hagi (10%) (Brazil) Rivaldo (10%) (Romania) Ciprian Marica (10%)
President	(Romania) Gheorghe Popescu
Vice-president	(Romania) Tiberiu Curt
Executive Director	(Romania) Cristiana Pariza
Sporting director	(Romania) Zoltán Iasko
Economic Director	(Romania) Gheorghe Mega
Marketing Director	(Romania) Costin Mega
Judicial Department	(Romania) Florin Comșa
Youth Center Director	(Romania) Pavel Peniu
Youth Center Technical Director	(Romania) Cristian Cămui
Organizer of Competitions	(Romania) Constantin Stamate
Sports Center Administrator	(Romania) Decebal Curumi
Scouting Director	(Romania) Alexandru Mățel
Team Manager	(Romania) Alin Cârstocea
Press Officer	(Romania) Sorin Teodoreanu

- Last updated: 10 September 2026
- Source: Board of Directors

=== Current technical staff ===
Role	Name
Head coach	(Romania) Ioan Sabău
Assistant coaches	(Romania) Nicolae Roșca (Italy) Marco Pompili
Goalkeeping coach	(Romania) Dumitru Hotoboc
Fitness coaches	(Romania) Radu Gheorghe (Romania) Lucian Turcu
Video analyst	(Romania) Bogdan Micu
Club doctor	(Romania) Cristian Tănase
Kinethotherapists	(Romania) Andrei Ariton (Romania) Bogdan Baltă
Masseurs	(Romania) Daniel Stoian (Romania) Cosmin Ghiorghe
Storemen	(Romania) Ștefan Pețu (Romania) Mihai Tutungiu

- Last updated: 10 September 2026
- Source: Technical staff
- Source: Medical staff

== European record ==
Competition	S	P	W	D	L	GF	GA	GD
UEFA Champions League	1	2	1	0	1	1	3	–2
UEFA Conference League	1	6	5	0	1	13	7	+6
UEFA Intertoto Cup	2	11	6	3	2	15	14	+1
Total	4	19	12	3	4	29	24	+5

=== UEFA Champions League ===
- 1QR: First qualifying round
- 2QR: Second qualifying round
- 3QR: Third qualifying round
- PO: Play-off round

Season	Round	Country	Club	Home	Away	Aggregate
2023–24	1QR	Moldova	Sheriff Tiraspol	1–0	0–3 (a.e.t.)	1–3

=== UEFA Europa Conference League ===
Season	Round	Country	Club	Home	Away	Aggregate
2023–24	2QR	Armenia	Urartu	3–2	3–2	6–4
2023–24	3QR	Estonia	Flora	3–0	2–0	5–0
2023–24	PO	Finland	HJK Helsinki	2–1	0–2	2–3

=== UEFA Intertoto Cup ===
- 1R: First round
- 2R: Second round
- 3R: Third round
- R16: Round of 16

Season	Round	Country	Club	Home	Away	Aggregate
1995	Group stage (8)	Serbia and Montenegro	Bečej	—N/a	2–1	1st place
1995	Group stage (8)	Poland	Pogoń Szczecin	2–1	—N/a	1st place
1995	Group stage (8)	France	Cannes	—N/a	0–0	1st place
1995	Group stage (8)	Belarus	Dnepr	2–0	—N/a	1st place
1995	R16	Netherlands	Heerenveen	—N/a	0–4	0–4
2006	1R	(North Macedonia) Republic of Macedonia	FK Pobeda	2–0	2–2	4–2
2006	2R	Bulgaria	PFC Lokomotiv Plovdiv	2–1	1–1	3–2
2006	3R	France	AJ Auxerre	1–0	1–4	2–4

== League and cup history ==
Season	Tier	Division	Place	National Cup
2026–27	1	Liga I	TBD	Play-off
2025–26	1	Liga I	13th (O)	Group Stage
2024–25	1	Liga I	11th	Semi-finals
2023–24	1	Liga I	4th	Group Stage
2022–23	1	Liga I	1st (C)	Group Stage
2021–22	1	Liga I	5th	Round of 32
2020–21	2	Liga II	7th (P)	Round of 16
2019–20	2	Liga II	9th	Fourth Round
2018–19	2	Liga II	14th	Third Round
2017–18	3	Liga III (Seria II)	1st (C, P)	Round of 32
2016–17	4	Liga IV (CT)	1st (C, P)	—N/a
2015–16	2	Liga II (Seria I)	5th (R)	Fourth Round
2014–15	2	Liga II (Seria I)	10th	Fifth Round
2013–14	2	Liga II (Seria I)	12th	Round of 32
2012–13	2	Liga II (Seria I)	11th	Round of 32
2011–12	2	Liga II (Seria I)	8th	Fourth Round
2010–11	2	Liga II (Seria I)	13th	Fourth Round
2009–10	2	Liga II (Seria I)	8th	Round of 32
2008–09	1	Liga I	16th (R)	Round of 32

Season	Tier	Division	Place	National Cup
2007–08	1	Liga I	13th	Round of 32
2006–07	1	Liga I	14th	Round of 16
2005–06	1	Divizia A	7th	Semi-finals
2004–05	1	Divizia A	5th	Final
2003–04	1	Divizia A	9th	Round of 32
2002–03	1	Divizia A	10th	Quarter-finals
2001–02	1	Divizia A	14th	Round of 32
2000–01	2	Divizia B (Seria I)	2nd (P)	—N/a
1999–00	1	Divizia A	15th (R)	Round of 32
1998–99	1	Divizia A	12th	Round of 32
1997–98	1	Divizia A	12th	Round of 16
1996–97	1	Divizia A	10th	Round of 16
1995–96	1	Divizia A	8th	Quarter-finals
1994–95	1	Divizia A	11th	Round of 16
1993–94	1	Divizia A	6th	Round of 16
1992–93	1	Divizia A	9th	Round of 16
1991–92	1	Divizia A	13th	Semi-finals
1990–91	1	Divizia A	10th	Quarter-finals
1989–90	1	Divizia A	9th	Quarter-finals

== Notable players ==
The footballers enlisted below have had international cap(s) for their respective countries at junior and/or senior level and/or more than 100 caps for FCV Farul Constanța.

Romania

- (Romania) Marcel Abăluță
- (Romania) Marian Aioani
- (Romania) Marian Aliuță
- (Romania) Dumitru Antonescu
- (Romania) Iulian Apostol
- (Romania) Andrei Artean
- (Romania) Sorin Avram
- (Romania) Cosmin Băcilă
- (Romania) Ionuț Bădescu
- (Romania) Robert Băjan
- (Romania) Mihai Bălașa
- (Romania) Alexandru Bălțoi
- (Romania) Gheorghe Barbu
- (Romania) Ion Barbu
- (Romania) Tudor Băluță
- (Romania) Andrei Borza
- (Romania) Octavian Brânzei
- (Romania) Vasile Brătianu
- (Romania) Iosif Bükössy
- (Romania) Gheorghe Butoiu
- (Romania) Petre Cădariu
- (Romania) Stelian Carabaș
- (Romania) Dumitru Caraman
- (Romania) Ion Ciosescu
- (Romania) Daniel Ciucă
- (Romania) Mugurel Cornățeanu
- (Romania) Vasilică Cristocea
- (Romania) George Curcă
- (Romania) Gheorghe Ciurea

Romania

- (Romania) Tiberiu Curt
- (Romania) Marian Dinu
- (Romania) Marin Dragnea
- (Romania) Răzvan Farmache
- (Romania) Laurențiu Florea
- (Romania) Mircea Georgescu
- (Romania) Constantin Grameni
- (Romania) Petre Grigoraș
- (Romania) Mihai Guriță
- (Romania) Gheorghe Hagi
- (Romania) Gabriel Iancu
- (Romania) Sevastian Iovănescu
- (Romania) Tiberiu Kallo
- (Romania) Constantin Koszka
- (Romania) Florin Lungu
- (Romania) Vasile Mănăilă
- (Romania) Cosmin Matei
- (Romania) Alexandru Mățel
- (Romania) Ion Mateescu
- (Romania) Liviu Mihai
- (Romania) Dănuț Moisescu
- (Romania) Cristian Munteanu
- (Romania) Louis Munteanu
- (Romania) Ștefan Nanu
- (Romania) Dragoș Nedelcu
- (Romania) Gheorghe Nițu
- (Romania) Bănică Oprea
- (Romania) Paul Papp

Romania

- (Romania) Cosmin Pașcovici
- (Romania) Florin Pătrașcu
- (Romania) Ștefan Petcu
- (Romania) Pavel Peniu
- (Romania) Marian Popa
- (Romania) Dumitru Popescu
- (Romania) Alexi Pitu
- (Romania) Aurel Rădulescu
- (Romania) Viorel Sălceanu
- (Romania) Ștefan Sameș
- (Romania) Mircea Sasu
- (Romania) Cristian Șchiopu
- (Romania) Adrian Senin
- (Romania) Dennis Șerban
- (Romania) Marius Soare
- (Romania) Mircea Stan
- (Romania) Mihai Stere
- (Romania) Ioan Tătăran
- (Romania) Bogdan Țîru
- (Romania) Dinu Todoran
- (Romania) Gabriel Torje
- (Romania) Sorin Trofin
- (Romania) Marin Tufan
- (Romania) Ion Zare
- (Romania) Ianis Zicu
- (Romania) Iosif Vigu
- (Romania) Ion Voicu

Brazil

- (Brazil) Rivaldinho

Congo

- (Republic of the Congo) Armel Disney

Ivory Coast

- (Ivory Coast) Kévin Boli

Liberia

- (Liberia) Ben Teekloh

Martinique

- (Martinique) Damien Dussaut

Nigeria

- (Nigeria) Kehinde Fatai

== Notable coaches ==
- (Romania) Ștefan Wetzer (1946–1947)
- (Romania) Eugen Mladin (1955)
- (Romania) Iosif Lengheriu (1956–1959)
- (Romania) Augustin Botescu (1960–1963)
- (Romania) Ion Mihăilescu (1964–1965)
- (Romania) Virgil Mărdărescu (1965–1968)
- (Romania) Bazil Marian (1969)
- (Romania) Emanoil Hașoti (1972–1975)
- (Romania) Emanoil Hașoti (1980–1982)
- (Romania) Emanoil Hașoti (1987–1988)
- (Romania) Gheorghe Constantin (1989–1990)
- (Romania) Emanoil Hașoti (1991)
- (Romania) Gheorghe Constantin (1994)
- (Romania) Vasile Simionaș (2000)
- (Romania) Ioan Andone
- (Romania) Ion Barbu
- (Germany) Wolfgang Frank
- (Romania) Petre Grigoraș
- (Romania) Gheorghe Hagi
- (Romania) Marin Ion
- (Romania) Florin Marin
- (Romania) Ioan Sdrobiș
- (Romania) Mihai Stoichiță
- (Romania) Marius Șumudică
- (Serbia) Momčilo Vukotić
