= Petre Grigoraș =

Romanian footballer and manager

Personal information
- Date of birth: 15 November 1964 (age 61)
- Place of birth: Poduri, Romania
- Height: 1.82 m (6 ft 0 in)
- Position: Striker

Team information
- Current team: Cetatea Suceava (head coach)

Youth career
- –1984: Aripile Bacău

Senior career*
Years	Team	Apps	(Gls)
1984–1988	Aripile Victoria Bacău	60	(36)
1988–1989	SC Bacău	29	(9)
1989–1990	Steaua București	15	(2)
1990–1992	Farul Constanța	34	(10)
1992–1993	Dobrudzha Dobrich	23	(10)
1993	Levski Sofia	10	(4)
1994	Lokomotiv Plovdiv	10	(6)
1994–1995	Farul Constanța	30	(10)
1995–1996	Universitatea Cluj	25	(5)
1996–1999	Farul Constanța	81	(20)
Total		317	(112)

Managerial career
- 1999–2000: Farul Constanța (assistant)
- 2000–2002: Farul Constanța
- 2002–2003: FC Oneşti
- 2003–2004: Petrolul Moinești
- 2004–2005: Farul Constanța
- 2005–2009: Oțelul Galați
- 2009–2010: Politehnica Iași
- 2010–2013: Pandurii Târgu Jiu
- 2013: Oțelul Galați
- 2013: CFR Cluj
- 2014: Pandurii Târgu Jiu
- 2015–2016: ASA Târgu Mureș
- 2016: ACS Poli Timișoara
- 2016–2017: Pandurii Târgu Jiu
- 2017–2018: Farul Constanța
- 2018–2019: Farul Constanța
- 2019–2020: Foresta Suceava
- 2020–2021: Oțelul Galați
- 2021–2025: Axiopolis Cernavodă
- 2026–: Cetatea Suceava
- * Club domestic league appearances and goals

Petre Grigoraș (born 15 November 1964) is a Romanian football manager and former player, currently in charge of Liga II club Cetatea Suceava.

== Honours ==
=== Player ===
Aripile Victoria Bacău

- Divizia C: 1984–85, 1987–88

Steaua București

- Cupa României runner-up: 1989–90

=== Coach ===
Farul Constanța

- Cupa României runner-up: 2004–05
- Liga III: 2017–18

Oțelul Galați

- UEFA Intertoto Cup: 2007
- Liga III: 2020–21

Axiopolis Cernavodă

- Liga IV – Constanța County: 2022–23

Cetatea Suceava

- Liga III: 2025–26

== Personal life ==
At Pandurii Târgu Jiu, Farul Constanța and Axiopolis Cernavodă he coached his son Alexandru, who played as a striker.
