= 2004–05 Cupa României =

Tournament details
- Country: Romania

Final positions
- Champions: Dinamo București
- Runners-up: Farul Constanţa

The 2004–05 Cupa României was the 67th season of the annual Romanian football knockout tournament.

The winners of the competition qualified for the second qualifying round of the 2005–06 UEFA Cup.

== Round of 32 ==
Team 1	Score	Team 2
13 October 2004
UTA Arad (Div. B)	1–0	(Div. A) Politehnica Iași
FCM Bacău II (Div. C)	0–2	(Div. A) Farul Constanța
FC Botoșani (Div. B)	0–1	(Div. A) Oțelul Galați
Dacia Unirea Brăila (Div. B)	1–0	(Div. A) Rapid București
Dinamo II București (Div. B)	3–2	(Div. A) Politehnica Timișoara
FC Caracal (Div. B)	0–4	(Div. A) Național București
Universitatea Cluj (Div. B)	1–0	(Div. A) Steaua București
CS Deva (Div. B)	0–3	(Div. A) Sportul Studențesc București
FC Ghimbav (Div. B)	0–2	(Div. A) Gloria Bistrița
Callatis Mangalia (Div. B)	0–1	(Div. A) Apulum Unirea Alba Iulia
Gaz Metan Mediaș (Div. B)	1–0	(Div. A) FC Brașov
Internațional Pitești (Div. B)	0–0 (a.e.t.) (4–5 p)	(Div. A) FCM Bacău
Olimpia Satu Mare (Div. B)	1–1 (a.e.t.) (3–5 p)	(Div. A) Dinamo București
Pandurii Târgu Jiu (Div. B)	0–1	(Div. A) CFR Cluj
Unirea Urziceni (Div. B)	1–2	(Div. A) Argeș Pitești
Armătura Zalău (Div. B)	0–2	(Div. A) FC U Craiova

== Round of 16 ==
Team 1	Score	Team 2
27 November 2004
Dinamo București	1–0	Gaz Metan Mediaș
Farul Constanța	2–1	CFR Cluj
Național București	5–1	FCM Bacău
Argeș Pitești	2–1	Gloria Bistrița
FC U Craiova	3–2 (a.e.t.)	Dinamo II București
Dacia Unirea Brăila	2–0	Apulum Unirea Alba Iulia
Oțelul Galați	1–1 (a.e.t.) (6–5 p)	Universitatea Cluj
Sportul Studențesc București	1–0	UTA Arad

== Quarter-finals ==
This phase was programmed on a two leg system. The games took place on 10 November and 1 December 2004.

Team 1	Agg.	Team 2	1st leg	2nd leg
Sportul Studențesc București	2–3	Național București	2–0	0–3
FC U Craiova	2–1	Argeș Pitești	1–0	1–1
Oțelul Galați	1–4	Farul Constanța	1–2	0–2
Dinamo București	3–0	Dacia Unirea Brăila	1–0	2–0

== Semi-finals ==
This phase was programmed on a two leg system. The games took place on 16 March and 13 April 2005.

Team 1	Agg.	Team 2	1st leg	2nd leg
Național București	2–5	Dinamo București	2–1	0–4
Farul Constanța	2–2 (a)	FC U Craiova	1–0	1–2

== Final ==
11 May 2005
20:15 EEST

Dinamo București	1–0	Farul Constanța
Grigorie 6'

Stadionul Cotroceni, Bucharest
Attendance: 15,000
Referee: Laurent Duhamel (France)

Cupa României 2004–05 winners

12th title
