= List of FC Steaua București players =

Below is a list of notable footballers who have played for Steaua București. Generally, this means players that have played 100 or more Liga I matches for the club. However, some players who have played fewer matches are also included: this includes some players who did not reach the 100 games but made significant contributions to the club's history and performances. Numbers below indicate national championship appearances for Steaua.

== Key to positions ==
GK	Goalkeeper	RB	Right back	RW	Right winger	DF	Defender
IF	Inside forward	LB	Left back	LW	Left winger	CB	Centre back
FW	Forward	FB	Full back	W	Winger	MF	Midfielder
ST	Striker	WH	Wing half	AM	Attacking midfielder	CM	Central midfielder

== Notable players ==
Appearances and goals adds from Steaua's official book.
Updated 17 July 2026.

Name	Nat	Pos	Career	Apps	Goals
Panait Ion	Romania	DF	1947–1948	18	1
Ioan Jivan	Romania	MF	1947–1948	25	0
Florin Marinescu	Romania	FW	1947–1948	23	9
T. Balasz	Romania	MF	1947–1949	30	9
Romeo Catană	Romania	DF	1947–1949	22	0
Florea Fătu	Romania	MF	1947–1949	32	6
Eugen Mladin	Romania	DF	1947–1949	33	2
Gheorghe Popescu I	Romania	FW	1947–1949	37	16
Stere Zeană	Romania	MF	1947–1949	38	2
Ilie Savu	Romania	GK	1947–1950	14	0
Aurelian Cernea	Romania	DF	1947–1951	56	0
Nicolae Drăgan	Romania	FW	1948–1953	83	36
Petre Moldoveanu	Romania	FW	1948–1955	130	40
Ștefan Onisie	Romania	MF	1948–1951; 1953–1959	138	5
Alexandru Apolzan	Romania	DF	1949–1962	216	2
Ion Voinescu	Romania	GK	1950–1963	162	0
Ion Alecsandrescu	Romania	FW	1950–1951; 1953–1962	162	80
Ștefan Balint	Romania	MF	1950–1955	99	1
Francisc Zavoda	Romania	FW	1950–1960	174	33
Mihai Flamaropol	Romania	FW	1951–1953	15	4
Victor Moldovan	Romania	FW	1951–1958	80	28
Victor Dumitrescu	Romania	DF	1951–1959	102	0
Tiberiu Bone	Romania	MF	1951–1962	195	7
Costică Toma	Romania	GK	1951–1963	108	0
Vasile Zavoda	Romania	DF	1951–1964	257	1
Iosif Petschovsky	Romania	FW	1952–1954	50	19
Traian Ivănescu	Romania	DF	1952–1963	147	1
Nicolae Tătaru	Romania	FW	1953–1964	210	75
Gheorghe Constantin	Romania	FW	1954–1969	258	148
Cornel Cacoveanu	Romania	FW	1955–1964	124	23
Emerich Jenei	Romania	DF	1957–1969	254	7
Ion Crișan	Romania	FW	1958–1965	83	9
Gabriel Raksi	Romania	FW	1958–1967	180	31
Bujor Hălmăgeanu	Romania	DF	1961–1964; 1965–1973	177	1
Carol Creiniceanu	Romania	FW	1961–1970	156	43
Florea Voinea	Romania	FW	1961–1970; 1972–1973	197	106
Cornel Pavlovici	Romania	ST	1963–1966	54	35
Vasile Suciu	Romania	GK	1962–1971	124	0
Mircea Petescu	Romania	DF	1963–1967	80	1
Sorin Avram	Romania	ST	1963–1969	124	25
Carol Haidu	Romania	GK	1964–1968; 1969–1974	118	0
Nicolae Dumitru	Romania	DF	1964–1970	127	0
Vasile Negrea	Romania	DF	1964–1973	189	7
Dumitru Popescu	Romania	MF	1965–1969	85	8
Lajos Sătmăreanu	Romania	RB	1965–1975	271	11
Nicolae Pantea	Romania	FW	1966–1975	196	24
Iosif Vigu	Romania	MF	1966–1973; 1974–1979	313	27
Gheorghe Tătaru	Romania	FW	1967–1974	169	57
Dumitru Dumitriu	Romania	MF	1968–1972	90	11
Gheorghe Cristache	Romania	DF	1968–1974	95	2
Anghel Iordănescu	Romania	MF	1968–1982; 1986	317	155
Costică Ștefănescu	Romania	CB	1969–1973	77	9
Marius Ciugarin	Romania	DF	1969–1974	86	0
Vasile Aelenei	Romania	MF	1970–1973; 1974–1981	123	10
Viorel Smărandache	Romania	DF	1971–1976	110	3
Viorel Năstase	Romania	FW	1971–1979	166	77
Vasile Iordache	Romania	GK	1971–1984	231	0
Ion Ion	Romania	MF	1972–1979	133	14
Ion Dumitru	Romania	MF	1972–1980	213	47
Ion Nițu	Romania	DF	1972–1973; 1976–1981	81	0
Marcel Răducanu	Romania	FW	1972–1981	229	94
Ștefan Sameș	Romania	DF	1973–1982	274	20
Dumitru Moraru	Romania	GK	1974–1978	84	0
Teodor Anghelini	Romania	DF	1974–1984	264	1
Radu Troi	Romania	FW	1975–1979	87	17
Constantin Zamfir	Romania	FW	1975–1980	107	21
Mario Agiu	Romania	DF	1975–1981	125	3
Gabriel Zahiu	Romania	DF; MF	1975–1981	120	31
Tudorel Stoica	Romania	MF	1975–1989; 1990	369	43
Adrian Ionescu	Romania	FW	1976–1982	107	18
Florin Marin	Romania	DF	1976–1984	174	3
Gavril Balint	Romania	FW	1980–1990	265	69
Daniel Minea I	Romania	FW	1980–1983; 1988–1991	103	10
Ștefan Iovan	Romania	DF	1981–1991; 1992	291	18
Mihail Majearu	Romania	MF	1981–1988	198	32
Septimiu Cîmpeanu	Romania	FW	1982–1984	57	21
Augustin Eduard	Romania	DF	1982–1985	78	1
Helmut Duckadam	Romania	GK	1982–1986	80	0
Miodrag Belodedici	Romania	DF	1982–1988; 1998–2001	235	21
Marius Lăcătuș	Romania	IF	1983–1990; 1993–2000	357	98
Victor Pițurcă	Romania	FW	1983–1989	174	137
Marin Radu II	Romania	FW	1984–1986	44	11
Ilie Bărbulescu	Romania	LB	1984–1987	77	3
Dumitru Stângaciu	Romania	GK	1984–1988; 1989–1995	191	0
László Bölöni	Romania	MF	1984–1988	97	24
Adrian Bumbescu	Romania	DF	1984–1992	188	4
Anton Weissenbacher	Romania	MF	1985–1987	39	5
Lucian Bălan	Romania	MF	1985–1989; 1990–1991	102	5
Dan Petrescu	Romania	DF	1985–1991	95	28
Iosif Rotariu	Romania	MF	1986–1990; 1997–1998	135	39
Ilie Dumitrescu	Romania	MF	1986–1987; 1988–1994; 1998	165	74
Gheorghe Hagi	Romania	MF	1987–1990	97	76
Nicolae Ungureanu	Romania	DF	1987–1992	136	10
Ilie Stan	Romania	LM	1987–1995; 1997	187	59
Silviu Lung	Romania	GK	1988–1990	49	0
Valeriu Răchită	Romania	CB	1989–1990; 1996–1998; 2002–2004	103	9
Daniel Gherasim	Romania	GK	1990–1998	87	0
Ion Vlădoiu	Romania	FW	1990–1993; 1995–1996; 2000–2001	122	60
Basarab Panduru	Romania	MF	1991–1995	131	34
Constantin Gâlcă	Romania	MF	1991–1996	148	24
Aurel Panait	Romania	DF	1991–1996	107	5
Bogdan Bucur	Romania	DM	1991–1997	90	2
Anton Doboș	Romania	DF	1992–1996	134	6
Ionel Pârvu	Romania	MF	1992–1996	112	12
Daniel Prodan	Romania	CB	1992–1996; 2000	122	10
Iulian Filipescu	Romania	CB	1992–1997	112	8
Tiberiu Csik	Romania	DF	1992–1999	77	3
Adrian Ilie	Romania	FW	1993–1996	85	28
Laurențiu Roșu	Romania	LM	1993–2000	159	45
Damian Militaru	Romania	AM	1994–1999	139	21
Bogdan Stelea	Romania	GK	1995–1997	47	0
Sabin Ilie	Romania	ST	1995–1997; 1999	69	36
Cătălin Munteanu	Romania	AM	1996–1998	45	22
Dennis Șerban	Romania	AM	1996–1998	62	15
Zoltan Ritli	Romania	GK	1996–2000	56	0
Cristian Ciocoiu	Romania	ST	1996–2001; 2004	127	32
Marius Baciu	Romania	CB	1996–2002	140	8
Iulian Miu	Romania	LB	1996–2002	149	4
Erik Lincar	Romania	CM	1997–2002	105	7
George Ogăraru	Romania	RB	1998–2000; 2002–2006; 2008–2009	113	3
Ionel Dănciulescu	Romania	ST	1998–2001	129	54
Eugen Trică	Romania	AM	1999–2003	130	21
Claudiu Răducanu	Romania	FW	1999–2003	92	58
Martin Tudor	Romania	GK	1999–2005	126	0
Sorin Paraschiv	Romania	DM	1999–2007	168	12
Pompiliu Stoica	Romania	LB	2000–2004	108	3
Nana Falemi	Cameroon	DM	2000–2005	94	6
Florentin Dumitru	Romania	RB	2000–2006	138	8
Mirel Rădoi	Romania	CB; DM	2000–2009	186	12
Adrian Neaga	Romania	FW	2001–2003; 2003–2005; 2007–2009	92	30
Mihai Neșu	Romania	LB	2001–2008	87	1
Sorin Ghionea	Romania	CB	2002–2004; 2005–2010	129	2
Daniel Oprița	Romania	W	2002–2007	107	15
Gabriel Boștină	Romania	MF	2002–2007	96	17
Vasily Khomutovsky	Belarus	GK	2003–2005	50	0
Dorinel Munteanu	Romania	MF	2003–2005; 2008	32	2
Laurențiu Diniță	Romania	ST	2003–2006	48	7
Andrei Cristea	Romania	ST	2004–2006	52	10
Cyril Théréau	France	ST	2006–2007	17	10
Nicolae Dică	Romania	AM; FW	2004–2008; 2011	136	58
Petre Marin	Romania	LB; RB	2004–2010	136	2
Victoraș Iacob	Romania	ST	2005–2008	45	13
Dorin Goian	Romania	CB	2005–2009	104	6
Florin Lovin	Romania	DM	2005–2009	103	3
Bănel Nicoliță	Romania	RW; LW	2005–2011	188	23
Valentin Badea	Romania	ST	2006–2008	50	15
Ovidiu Petre	Romania	CM	2006–2010	74	5
Paweł Golański	Poland	RB	2007–2010	58	2
Róbinson Zapata	Colombia	GK	2007–2010	85	0
Juan Toja	Colombia	FW	2008–2010	51	3
Dayro Moreno	Colombia	FW	2008–2010	43	12
Bogdan Stancu	Romania	FW; ST	2008–2010	72	32
Pantelis Kapetanos	Greece	ST	2008–2011; 2013–2014	73	30
Pablo Brandán	Argentina	DM	2010–2012	43	0
Geraldo Alves	Portugal	CB	2010–2012	54	3
Raul Rusescu	Romania	FW	2011–2013; 2014–2015; 2018–2019	105	42
Leandro Tatu	Brazil	FW	2011–2013	44	6
Vlad Chiricheș	Romania	CB	2012–2013; 2023–2026	90	2
Alexandru Bourceanu	Romania	DM	2011–2014; 2014–2015; 2016	118	3
Ciprian Tătărușanu	Romania	GK	2008–2014	133	0
Federico Piovaccari	Italy	FW	2013–2014	25	10
Florin Gardoș	Romania	CB	2010–2014	81	3
Mihai Pintilii	Romania	MF	2012–2014; 2016–2020	125	9
Łukasz Szukała	Poland	CB	2012–2014	65	12
Lucian Sânmărtean	Romania	CM	2014	26	5
Claudiu Keșerü	Romania	FW	2014–2015; 2021–2022	53	25
Iasmin Latovlevici	Romania	LB	2010–2015	110	7
Andrei Prepeliță	Romania	CM	2011–2015	82	9
Giedrius Arlauskis	Lithuania	GK	2014–2015	25	0
Cristian Tănase	Romania	LW	2009–2015; 2018	162	20
Alexandru Chipciu	Romania	FW	2012–2016	116	24
Fernando Varela (footballer)	Cape Verde	CB	2013–2016	82	10
Nicolae Stanciu (footballer, born 1993)	Romania	FW	2013–2016	90	24
Alin Toșca	Romania	DF	2014–2017	65	0
Jugurtha Hamroun	Algeria	FW	2015–2017	31	8
Adrian Popa (footballer, born 1988)	Romania	MF	2012–2017; 2019–2020	154	22
Gabriel Tamaș	Romania	DF	2015; 2016–2017	50	1
Fernando Boldrin	Brazil	MF	2016–2017	30	8
Florin Niță	Romania	GK	2013–2018	87	0
Constantin Budescu	Romania	FW	2017–2018; 2021–2022	37	10
Denis Alibec	Romania	FW	2017–2018, 2025-2026	41	9
Filipe Teixeira	Portugal	MF	2017–2019	54	5
Romario Benzar	Romania	DF	2017–2019	50	1
Junior Morais	Brazil	DF	2017–2019	49	0
Mihai Bălașa	Romania	DF	2017–2019	61	0
Harlem Gnohéré	France	FW	2017–2020	92	41
Bogdan Planic	Serbia	DF	2017–2020	71	1
Marko Momcilovic	Serbia	DF	2016–2020	72	7
Dennis Man	Romania	FW	2016–2021	114	41
Lucian Filip	Romania	MF	2007–2021	127	6
Olimpiu Moruțan	Romania	MF	2018–2021	90	12
Paulo Vinícius (footballer, born 1984)	Brazil	DF	2021–2022	25	2
Andrei Miron	Romania	DF	2020–2022	63	2
Dragoș Nedelcu	Romania	MF	2017–2022	62	2
Florin Tănase	Romania	FW	2016–2022, 2024–2026	259	96
Iulian Cristea	Romania	DF	2019–2023	120	8
Joonas Tamm	Estonia	DF	2022–2023	35	3
Billel Omrani	Algeria	FW	2022–2023	22	2
Răzvan Oaidă	Romania	MF	2019–2023	98	5
Deian Sorescu	Romania	MF	2023	18	2
Andrei Cordea	Romania	FW	2021–2023	79	12
Valentin Gheorghe	Romania	MF	2021–2023	29	6
Damjan Djokovic	Croatia	MF	2023–2024	17	2
Ianis Stoica	Romania	FW	2017–2024	38	7
Andrea Compagno	Italy	FW	2022–2024	45	19
Ovidiu Popescu	Romania	MF	2016–2024	200	4
Florinel Coman	Romania	FW	2017–2024	190	53
Andrei Vlad	Romania	GK	2017–2024	90	0
Ionuț Panțîru	Romania	DF	2019–2025	57	1
Alexandru Băluță	Romania	FW	2023–2025	58	9
Malcom Edjouma	France	MF	2022–2025	80	13
Adrian Șut	Romania	MF	2019–2026	162	13
Darius Olaru	Romania	MF	2020–2026	202	49
Mihai Lixandru	Romania	MF	2020–2026	77	6

(*) Still playing for Steaua

== Gallery ==
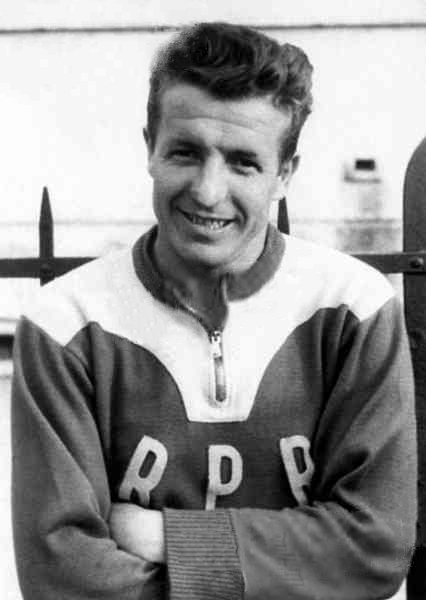
Alexandru Apolzan, former captain of Steaua's Golden Team in the 1950s

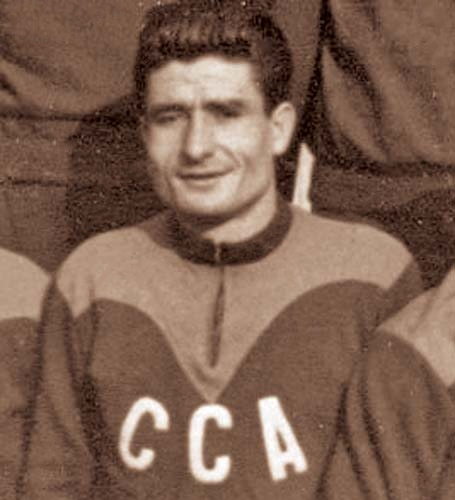
Ion Voinescu, former goalkeeper of Steaua in the 1950s

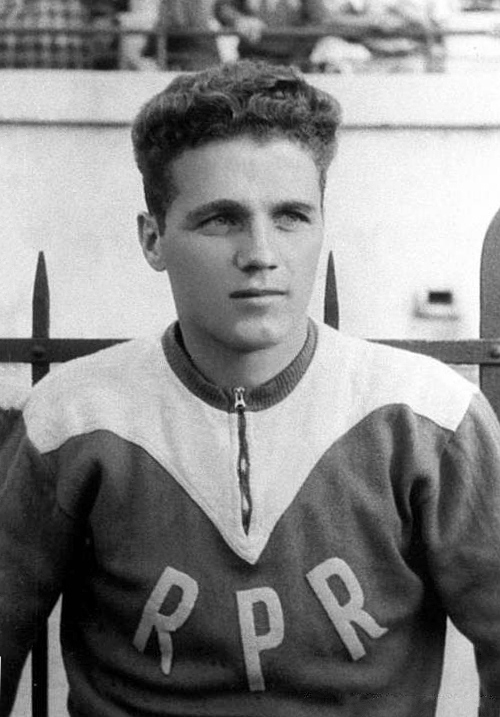
Nicolae Tătaru, former striker of Steaua played for the club from 1953 to 1964.

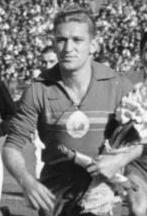
Iosif Petschovschi, former midfielder of Steaua in the 1950s.

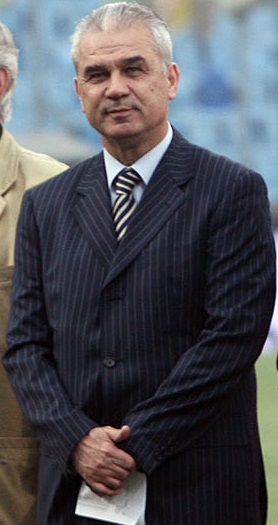
Anghel Iordănescu, is the highest goalscorer in the history of club.

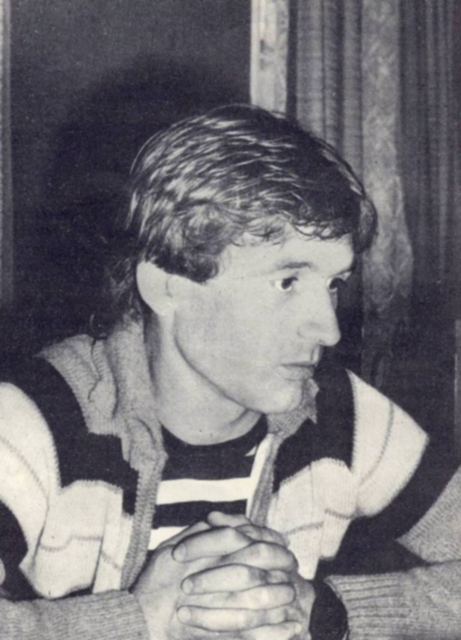
Ion Dumitru, former captain of Steaua.

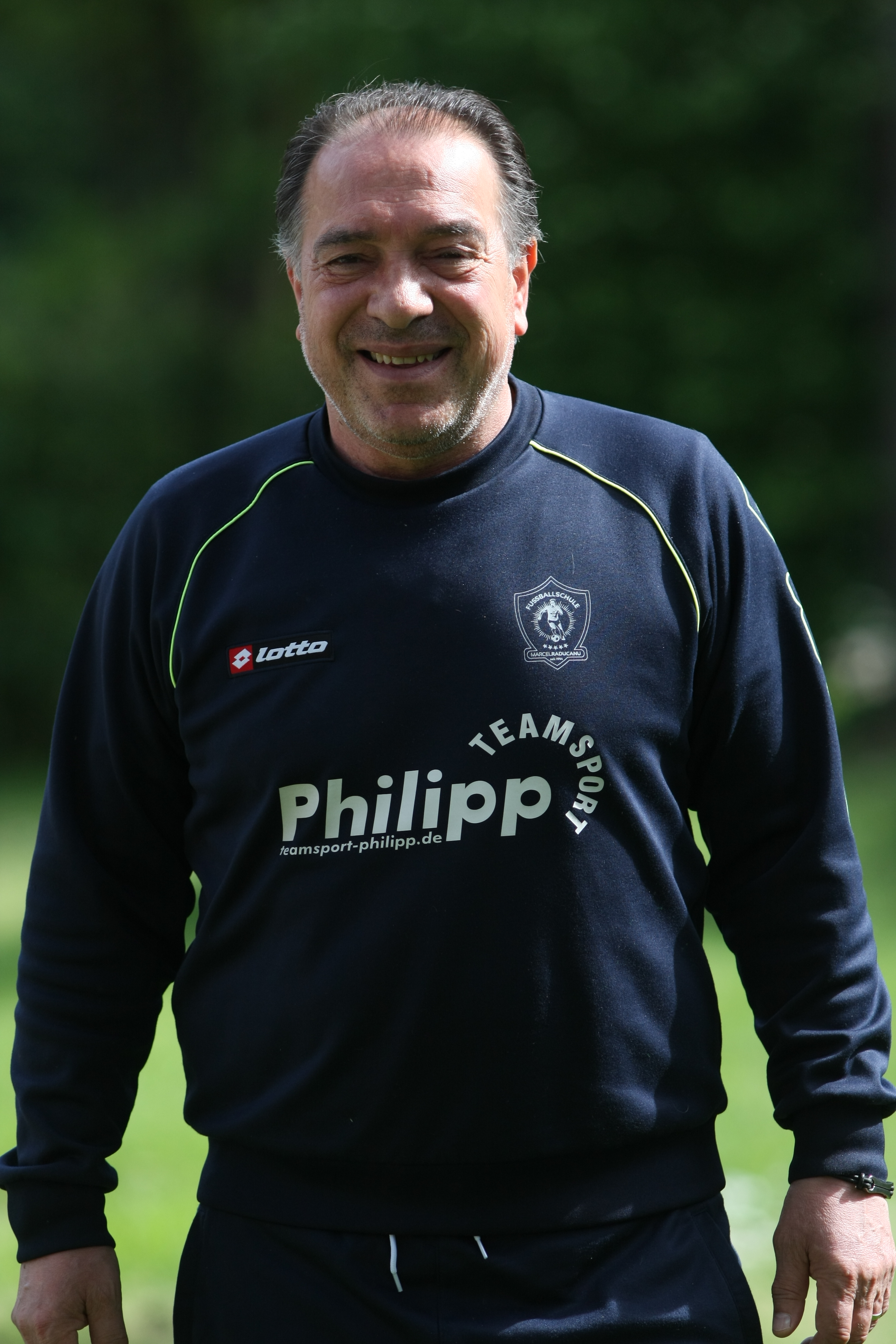
Marcel Răducanu, former midfielder of Steaua .

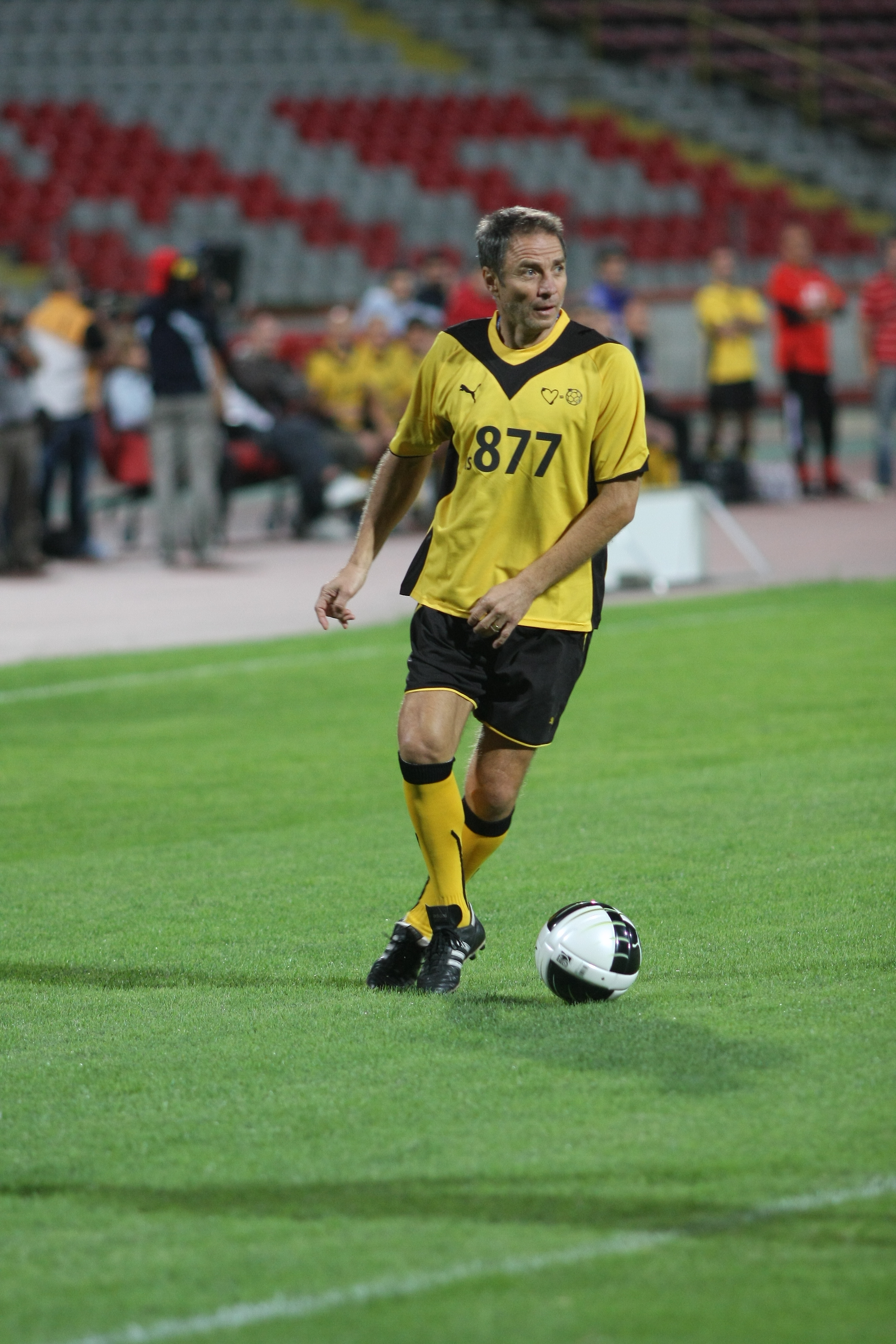
Tudorel Stoica, the most capped player in the history of the club.

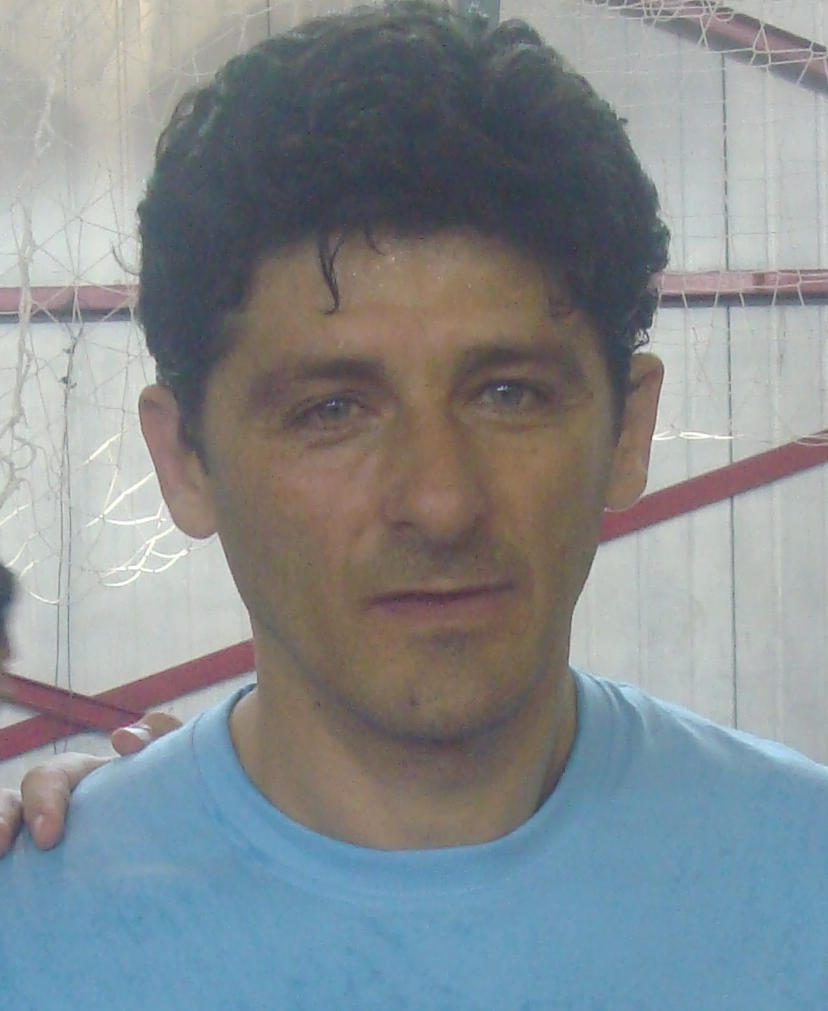
Miodrag Belodedici, former captain of Steaua.

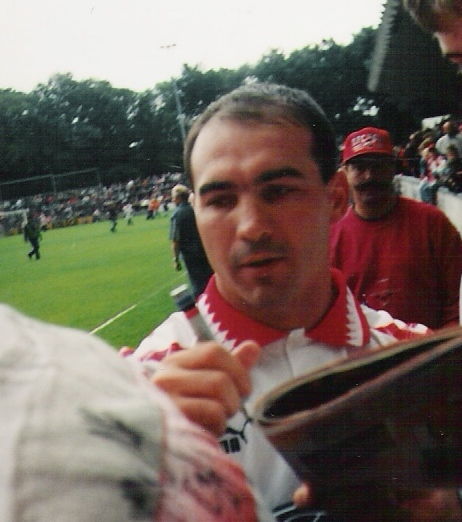
Ion Vlădoiu, former top scorer of Steaua.

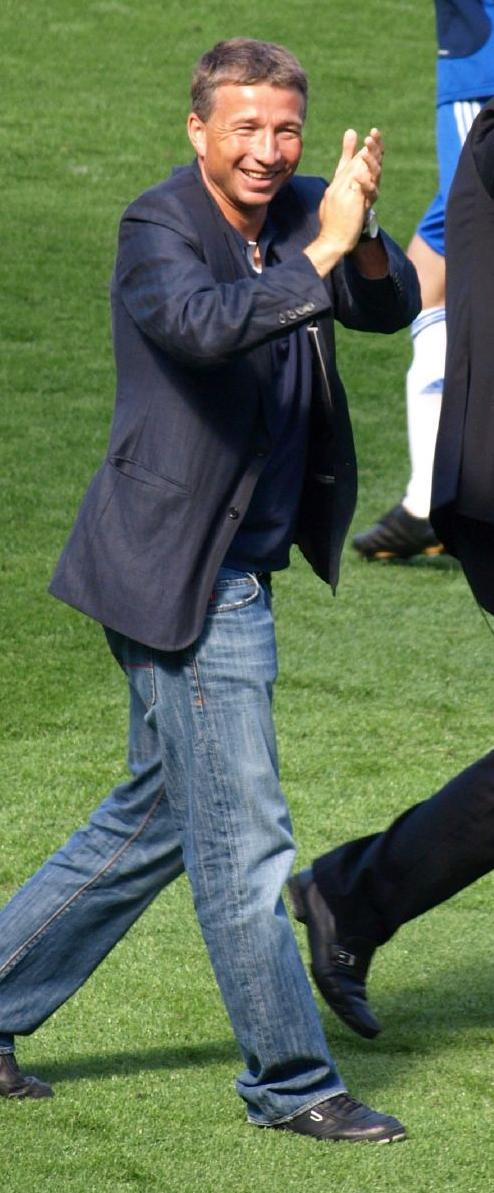
Dan Petrescu, former captain of Steaua in 1991.

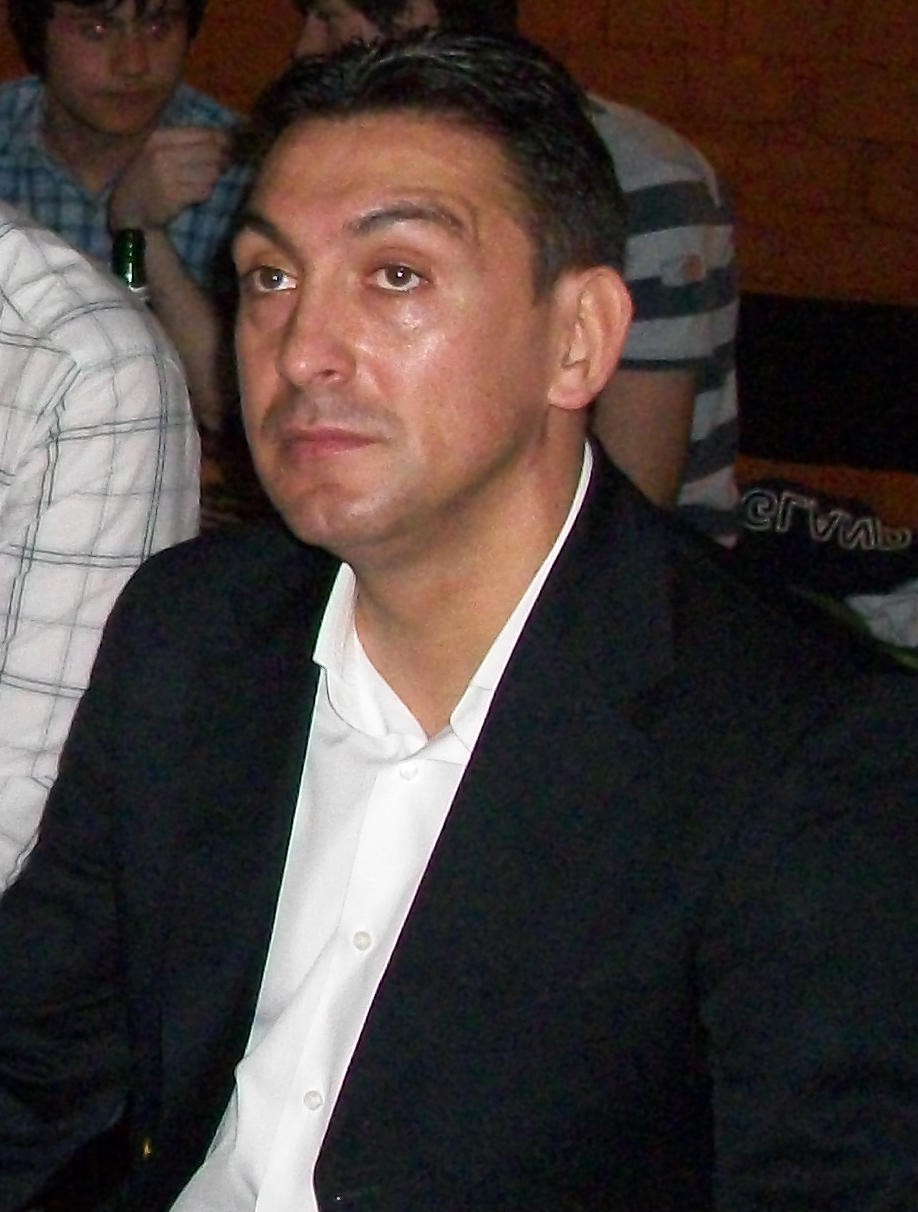
Ilie Dumitrescu, former captain and top scorer of Steaua.

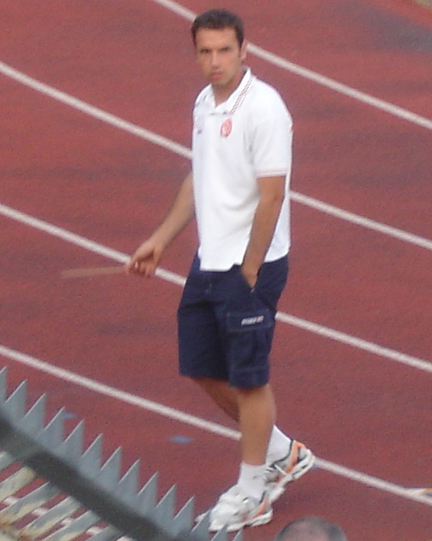
Sorin Paraschiv, former Steaua player, played 8 years at Steaua.

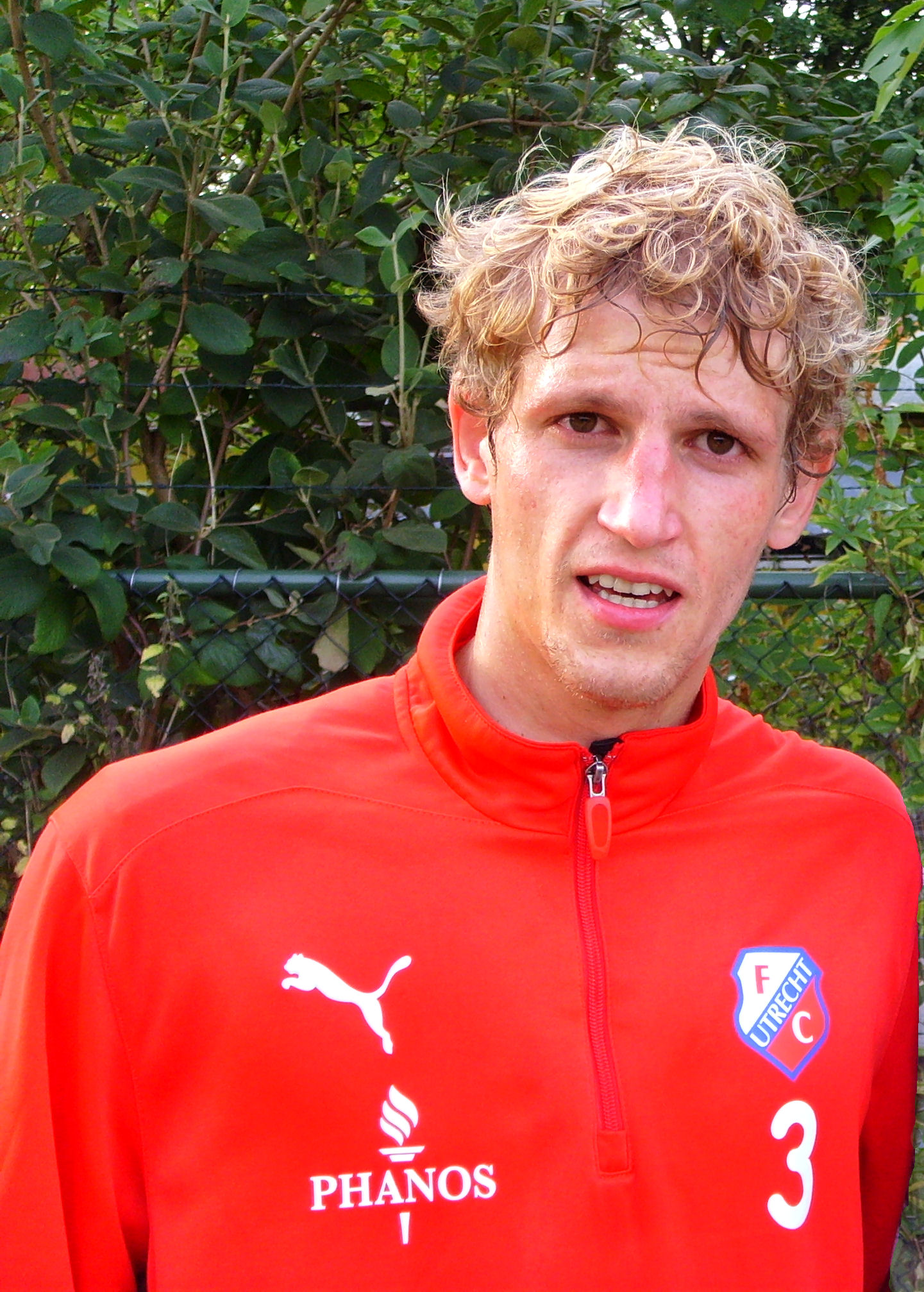
Mihai Neșu, former Steaua left back.

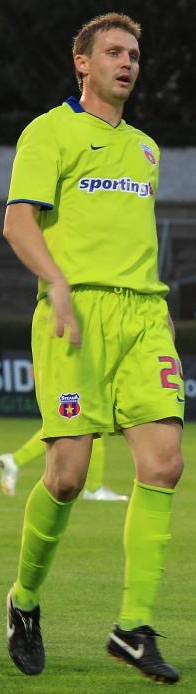
Sorin Ghionea, former captain of Steaua.

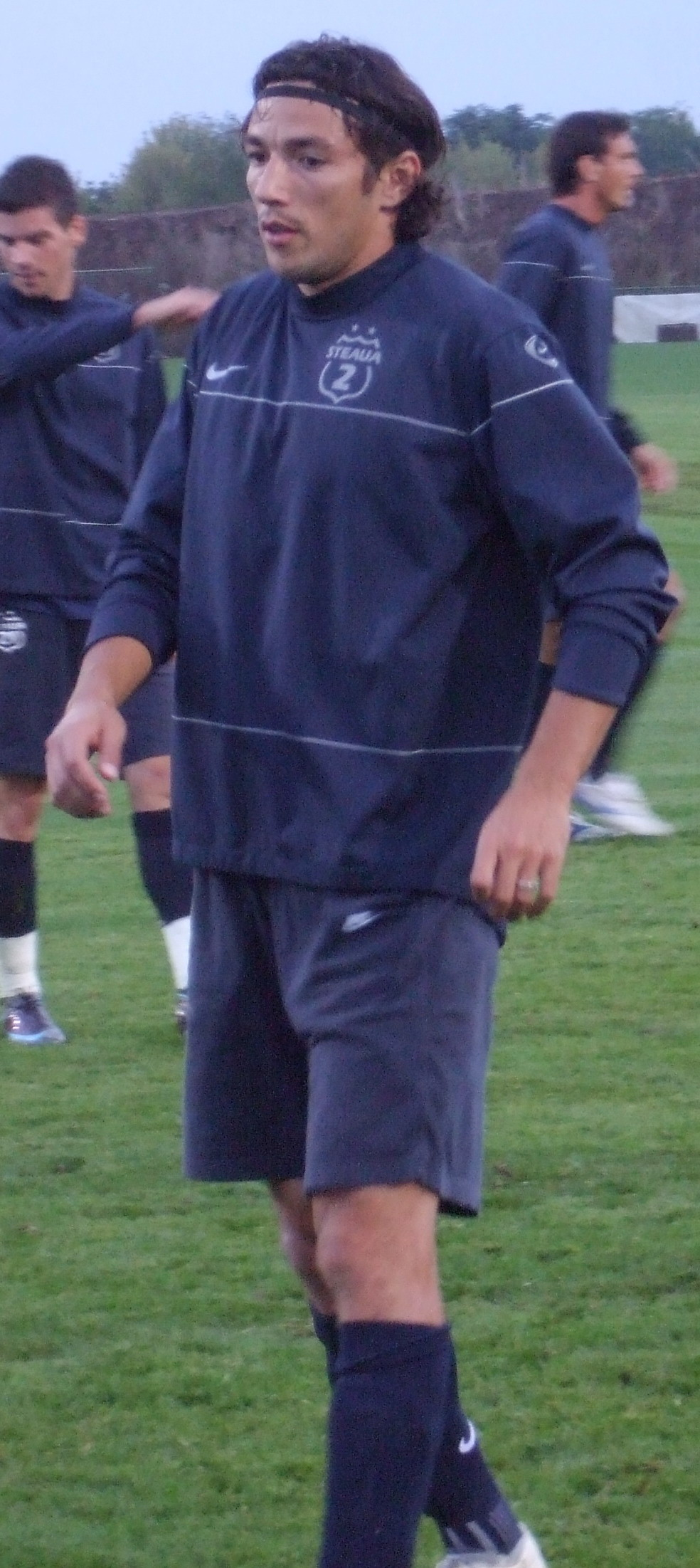
George Ogăraru, former Steaua player, played 10 years at Steaua.

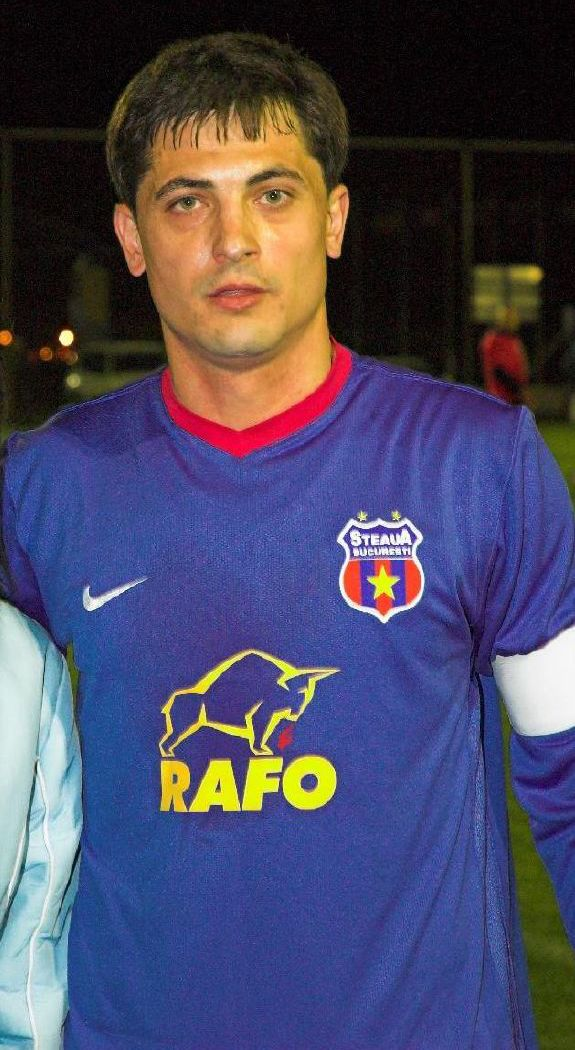
Mirel Rădoi, former captain of Steaua, played 9 years at Steaua.

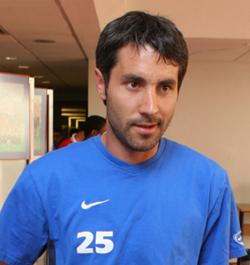
Adrian Neaga, former Steaua striker.

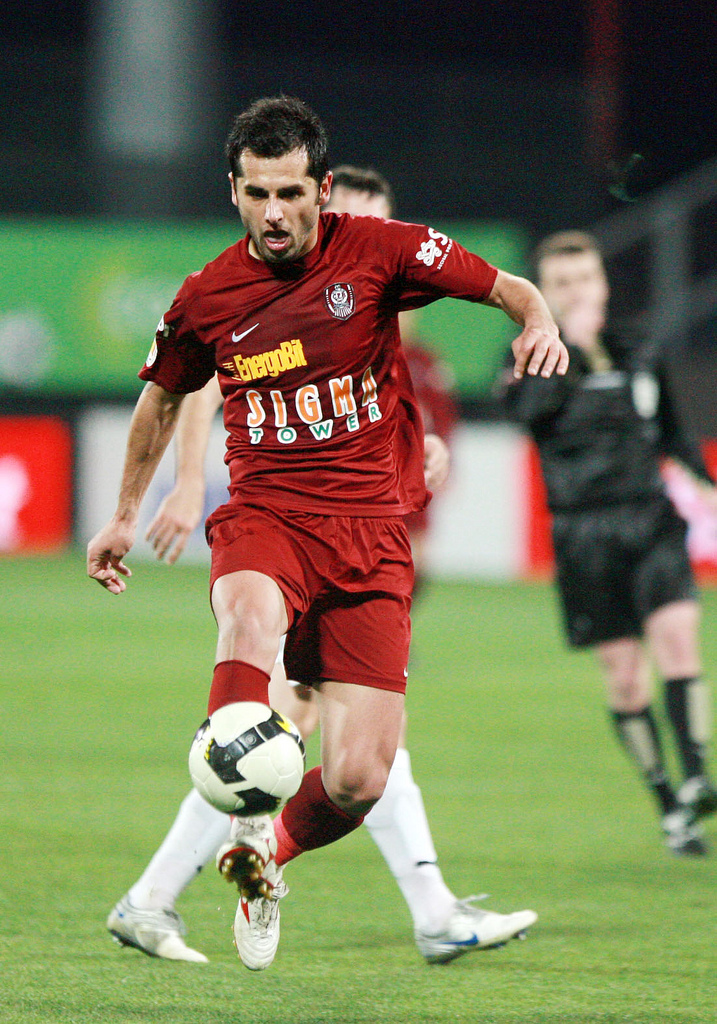
Nicolae Dică, former Steaua midfielder.

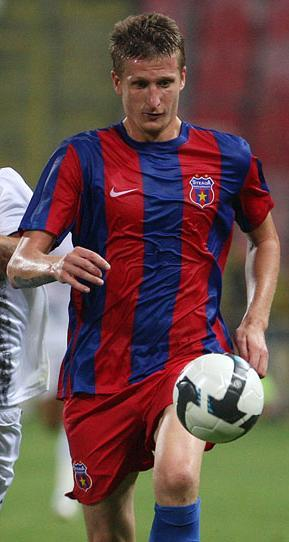
Dorin Goian, former Steaua defender.

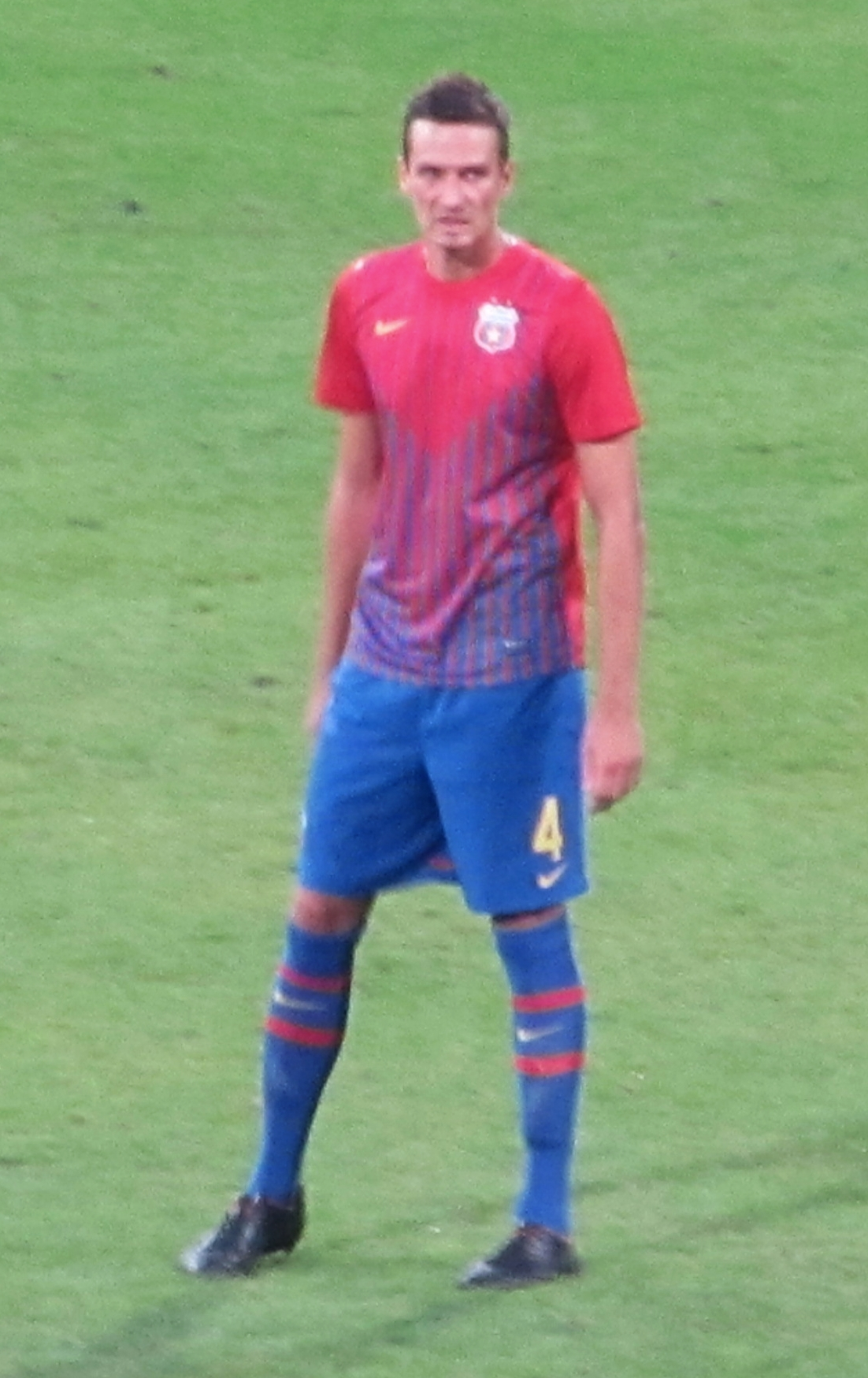
Łukasz Szukała, former Steaua defender.
