= Pițurcă =

- Language: Romanian

Piţurcă is a surname of Romanian origin. Notable people with the name include:

- Victor Piţurcă, Romanian footballer and manager
- Alexandru Piţurcă, Romanian footballer, son of Victor
