= Tiberiu Lung =

Romanian footballer and coach

Personal information
- Full name: Tiberiu Adrian Lung
- Date of birth: 24 December 1978 (age 47)
- Place of birth: Craiova, Romania
- Height: 1.95 m (6 ft 5 in)
- Position: Goalkeeper

Senior career*
Years	Team	Apps	(Gls)
1997–1999	Universitatea Craiova	53	(0)
2000–2003	Steaua București	13	(0)
2004–2005	Pandurii Târgu Jiu	37	(0)
2006	Minerul Motru	4	(0)
2006	Caracal	31	(0)
2007–2008	Ayia Napa	26	(0)
2008–2009	Onisilos Sotira	24	(0)
2009–2010	Ayia Napa	17	(0)
2010–2011	Mpumalanga Black Aces	0	(0)
Total		205	(0)

International career
1996	Romania U18	7	(0)
1998–1999	Romania U21	13	(0)
1999	Romania	1	(0)

Managerial career
- 2011: Universitatea Craiova (GK Coach)
- 2012: Turnu Severin (GK Coach)
- 2014–2019: CS U Craiova (youth–GK Coach)
- 2019–: FC Miercurea Ciuc (GK Coach)
- * Club domestic league appearances and goals

Tiberiu Adrian Lung (born 24 December 1978) is a Romanian former professional footballer who played as a goalkeeper. After retirement he started his coaching career, as a goalkeeping coach.

== Club career ==
=== Universitatea Craiova ===
Lung was born on 24 December 1978 in Craiova, Romania. He began his senior career at local club Universitatea Craiova, making his Divizia A debut on 30 November 1997 under coach Constantin Oțet in a 3–0 away loss to Dinamo București.

=== Steaua București ===
In the middle of the 1999–2000 season, Lung left "U" Craiova to join Steaua București. On 22 April 2000, while his side was leading 1–0 in a derby against Dinamo, he replaced the injured Martin Tudor in the 28th minute. Fourteen minutes later he saved a penalty taken by Ioan Lupescu. Shortly afterwards, in the 44th minute of the game, he tried to grab a cross delivered by Florentin Petre, but dropped the ball in the goal. The match ultimately was lost 3–2 and Dinamo earned the points that mathematically secured their championship win. In the 2000–01 season, Steaua won the title, but coach Victor Pițurcă used Lung in only one game, as Martin Tudor was first-choice goalkeeper. Subsequently, Lung played the entire match under Pițurcă in the 2–1 win over Dinamo in the 2001 Supercupa României. He then played in a 1–1 draw against Dynamo Kyiv in the 2001–02 Champions League third qualifying round. Afterwards, he appeared in both legs of the 2–1 aggregate loss to St. Gallen in the first round of the 2001–02 UEFA Cup.

=== Pandurii Târgu Jiu, Minerul Motru and Caracal ===
In 2004, Lung went to play for Divizia B club Pandurii Târgu Jiu. He helped the team gain promotion to the first league at the end of the 2004–05 season. Afterwards, he made his last Divizia A appearance on 27 August 2005 in Pandurii's 1–0 loss to FCM Bacău, totaling 70 matches in the competition. Lung then returned to the second league by joining Minerul Motru for a short stint, before moving to Caracal in the same league.

=== Onisilos Sotira and Ayia Napa ===
In 2007, Lung joined Cypriot First Division club Ayia Napa, where he was teammates with compatriot Cristian Vlad. The team suffered relegation at the end of the 2006–07 season, but he stayed with the club for one more year. He then moved to fellow second-tier club Onisilos Sotira for the 2008–09 season, only to return afterwards to Ayia Napa.

=== Mpumalanga Black Aces ===
In June 2010, Lung joined Mpumalanga Black Aces. However, he did not get to play in the South African Premiership due to an injury.

== International career ==
In 1996, Lung played seven games for Romania's under-18 national team, and from 1998 to 1999, he made 13 appearances for the under-21 side. He was part of the under-21 team that managed a first-ever qualification to a European Championship in 1998, which Romania subsequently hosted. In the final tournament that was composed of eight teams, coach Victor Pițurcă did not use him in any matches, as Bogdan Lobonț was the first-choice goalkeeper, and the team lost all three games, finishing in last place.

Lung played his only game for Romania on 3 March 1999, when Pițurcă introduced him in the 89th minute to replace Lobonț in a 2–0 friendly victory against Estonia.

== Personal life ==
He is the son of Silviu Lung and the older brother of Silviu Lung Jr., both of whom played as goalkeepers and represented Romania at international level.

== Honours ==
Steaua București

- Divizia A: 2000–01
- Supercupa României: 2001

Pandurii Târgu Jiu

- Divizia B: 2004–05
