= Adrian Pigulea =

Romanian footballer (born 1968)

Personal information
- Full name: Adrian Ion Pigulea
- Date of birth: 12 May 1968 (age 58)
- Place of birth: Strehaia, Romania
- Height: 1.85 m (6 ft 1 in)
- Position: Forward

Youth career
- Armătura Strehaia
- Universitatea Craiova

Senior career*
Years	Team	Apps	(Gls)
1987–1988	Electromureș Târgu-Mureș		
1988–1992	Universitatea Craiova	82	(16)
1992–1993	Aris Limassol	24	(6)
1993–1995	Universitatea Craiova	43	(5)
1995–2001	Național București	132	(18)
Total		281	(45)

International career
1991	Romania B	5	(1)
1991	Romania	1	(0)
- * Club domestic league appearances and goals

Adrian Pigulea (born 12 May 1968) is a Romanian former professional footballer who played as a forward.

== Club career ==
Pigulea was born on 12 May 1968 in Strehaia, Romania and began playing junior-level football at local club Armătura. He started to play senior football in 1987 at Divizia B club Electromureș Târgu-Mureș. In 1988, he joined Universitatea Craiova, making his Divizia A debut on 4 September under coach Gheorghe Constantin in a 5–0 away loss to Argeș Pitești. Pigulea helped the club win The Double in the 1990–91 season under the guidance of coach Sorin Cârțu, contributing with 12 goals scored in 31 league appearances, being the team's third top-scorer, with one goal behind Gheorghe Ciurea and Emil Săndoi. He also played as a starter until the 87th minute when he was replaced with Gheorghe Craioveanu in the 2–1 win over FC Bacău in the Cupa României final.

In 1992, Pigulea played one season in the Cypriot First Division for Aris Limassol, his only experience outside Romania. Afterwards he returned for two seasons at "U" Craiova, in both of which the team finished second in the league, also reaching the 1994 Cupa României final where he did not play in the 2–1 loss to Gloria Bistrița. In 1995 he joined Național București where in the first two seasons he was again runner-up in the league. They also reached the 1997 Cupa României final where coach Florin Halagian used Pigulea in the first half, replacing him with Cătălin Liță for the second in the eventual 4–2 loss to Steaua București. Under Halagian, he also represented The Bankers in all six games in the 1996–97 UEFA Cup edition, eliminating Partizan Belgrade and Chornomorets Odesa in the first rounds, the campaign ending after a 3–1 aggregate loss to Club Brugge. Across his career, Pigulea made a total of 27 appearances with seven goals scored in European competitions (including six games with three goals in the Intertoto Cup), managing to score a hat-trick for Național against Cwmbran Town in a 7–0 win in the 1997–98 Cup Winners' Cup qualifying round. The 2000–01 season spent with Național was the last of Pigulea's career, totaling 257 Divizia A matches with 40 goals.

== International career ==
Pigulea played five games and scored once for Romania's B side, as they won the 1991 Nehru Cup.

Pigulea played a single match for Romania on 28 August 1991, when coach Mircea Rădulescu sent him in the 60th minute to replace Ion Timofte in a 2–0 friendly loss to USA.

== Personal life ==
Pigulea married Clara, the daughter of former Universitatea Craiova striker Ion Oblemenco.

== Honours ==
Universitatea Craiova

- Divizia A: 1990–91, runner-up 1993–94, 1994–95
- Cupa României: 1990–91, runner-up 1993–94

Național București

- Divizia A runner-up: 1995–96, 1996–97
- Cupa României runner-up: 1996–97

Romania B

- Nehru Cup: 1991
