= Cătălin Liță =

Romanian footballer

Personal information
- Full name: Cătălin Nicolae Liță
- Date of birth: 23 March 1975 (age 51)
- Place of birth: Bucharest, Romania
- Height: 1.69 m (5 ft 7 in)
- Positions: Attacking midfielder; right midfielder

Senior career*
Years	Team	Apps	(Gls)
1993–2000	Național București	214	(26)
2001–2002	Steaua București	45	(5)
2003	MTK Budapest	8	(0)
2003	Apollon Limassol	0	(0)
2004	Petrolul Ploiești	4	(1)
2004–2005	Național București	36	(2)
2006	Khazar Lankaran	7	(4)
Total		314	(37)

International career
1993–1998	Romania U21	18	(0)
- * Club domestic league appearances and goals

Cătălin Nicolae Liță (born 23 March 1975) is a Romanian former footballer who played as a midfielder.

== Club career ==
Liță was born on 23 March 1975 in Bucharest, Romania. He began playing football at Național București, making his Divizia A debut on 15 August 1993 under coach Ion Ionescu in a 2–0 away victory against Ceahlăul Piatra Neamț. He played two matches in the 1996–97 UEFA Cup campaign, helping the team eliminate Partizan Belgrade before being defeated by Club Brugge. They also reached the 1997 Cupa României final, where coach Florin Halagian sent Liță on at halftime to replace Adrian Pigulea in the 4–2 loss to Steaua București. Subsequently, Liță played four matches during the 1997–98 Cup Winners' Cup and scored a brace to help Național get past Cwmbran Town, but they were defeated by Kocaelispor in the following round. Later, he made six appearances as The Bankers got past Hapoel Haifa and Iraklis, scoring three goals —two against the former and one against the latter— with the team reaching the third round where they were defeated by Bologna.

Liță joined Steaua in the middle of the 2000–01 season, playing 14 games and scoring once to help the team win the title under coach Victor Pițurcă. Afterwards, he played the entire match in Steaua's 2–1 victory against rivals Dinamo București in the 2001 Supercupa României. Liță also appeared in a 3–0 win over Sloga Jugomagnat in the 2001–02 Champions League second qualifying round. Then he played in both legs of the 3–2 aggregate loss to St. Gallen in the first round of the 2001–02 UEFA Cup.

Midway through the 2002–03 season, Liță left Steaua to join MTK Budapest, where he became a teammate of compatriot Daniel Rednic. Liță made his Nemzeti Bajnokság I debut on 15 March 2003, when coach Sándor Egervári sent him in the 80th minute to replace Péter Czvitkovics in a 2–2 draw against Békéscsaba. He made eight league appearances until the end of the season, helping the club win the title. In 2003, Liță signed with Cypriot side Apollon Limassol, but did not play a single league match for them. In the middle of the 2003–04 season, he moved to Petrolul Ploiești, though he could not help them avoid relegation. In 2004, Liță returned to Național, where he made his last Divizia A appearance on 29 October 2005 in a 2–1 away loss to Politehnica Timișoara, totaling 299 matches with 34 goals in the competition. Liță retired in 2006, after playing for Azerbaijan Top League club Khazar Lankaran.

== International career ==
Liță played 18 matches for Romania's under-21 national team from 1993 to 1998. He was part of the side that managed a first-ever qualification to a European Championship in 1998, which Romania subsequently hosted. In the final tournament that was composed of eight teams, coach Victor Pițurcă used him in two games which were losses to the Netherlands and Russia, as they finished in last place.

== Honours ==
Național București

- Cupa României runner-up: 1996–97

Steaua București

- Divizia A: 2000–01
- Supercupa României: 2001

MTK Budapest

- Nemzeti Bajnokság I: 2002–03
