= 1997 Cupa României final =

- Event: 1996–97 Cupa României
Steaua București	Naţional București
Divizia A	Divizia A
4	2
- Date: 4 June 1997
- Venue: Stadionul Naţional, Bucharest
- Man of the Match: (Romania) Sabin Ilie
- Referee: Sorin Corpodean (Romania)
- Attendance: 25,000

The 1997 Cupa României final was the 59th final of Romania's most prestigious cup competition. The final was played at the Stadionul Naţional in Bucharest on 4 June 1997 and was contested between Divizia A sides Steaua București and Naţional București. The cup was won by Steaua.

== Route to the final ==
CSA Steaua București

Round of 32	FC Oneşti	0–2	Steaua București
Round of 16	Steaua București	5–0	Midia Năvodari
Quarter-finals	Steaua București	3–2 (a.e.t)	Petrolul Ploieşti
Semi-finals	Steaua București	2–1	Universitatea Craiova

FC Naţional București

Round of 32	ASA Târgu Mureş	1–3	Naţional București
Round of 16	Naţional București	1–0 (a.e.t)	Inter Sibiu
Quarter-finals	Naţional București	3–1	U Cluj
Semi-finals	Naţional București	2–1	Dinamo București

== Match details ==
4 June 1997
21:00 EEST

Steaua București	4–2	Naţional București
Ilie 2', 5', 30' (pen.); Ciocoiu 86'	Report	Dună 10'; Petre 89'

Stadionul Naţional, Bucharest
Attendance: 25,000
Referee: Sorin Corpodean (Romania)

Steaua București	Naţional București

STEAUA BUCUREŞTI:
GK	12	(Romania) Bogdan Stelea
RWB	2	(Romania) Laurenţiu Reghecampf
CD	4	(Romania) Adrian Matei
CD	6	(Romania) Valeriu Răchită
CD	11	(Romania) Marius Baciu
LWB	3	(Romania) Iulian Miu
RM	10	(Romania) Dennis Şerban	(substituted off) 75'
CM	5	(Romania) Iosif Rotariu
LM	8	(Romania) Damian Militaru
FW	7	(Romania) Marius Lăcătuş (c)	(substituted off) 80'
FW	9	(Romania) Sabin Ilie	(substituted off) 84'
Substitutes:
MF	15	(Romania) Cătălin Munteanu	(substituted in) 84'
MF	14	(Romania) Laurenţiu Roşu	(substituted in) 75'
FW	16	(Romania) Cristian Ciocoiu	(substituted in) 80'
Manager:
(Romania) Dumitru Dumitriu

NAŢIONAL BUCUREŞTI:
GK	1	(Romania) Răzvan Lucescu
DF	2	(Romania) Dorel Zegrean	(substituted off) 60'
DF	3	(Romania) Liviu Ciobotariu
DF	5	(Romania) Cătălin Necula
DF	4	(Romania) Ion Sburlea
DF	7	(Romania) Petre Marin
MF	6	(Romania) Adrian Pigulea	(substituted off) 46'
MF	8	(Romania) Dănuţ Moisescu	(substituted off) 67'
MF	10	(Romania) Cristian Vasc
FW	11	(Romania) Marin Dună (c)
FW	9	(Romania) Radu Niculescu
Substitutes:
MF	16	(Romania) Cătălin Liță	(substituted in) 46'
MF	14	(Romania) Tinel Petre	(substituted in) 60'
FW	15	(Romania) Cristian Albeanu	(substituted in) 67'
Manager:
(Romania) Florin Halagian

MATCH OFFICIALS

- Assistant referees:
  - (Romania) Vasile Avram
  - (Romania) Ion Constantinescu
- Fourth official:

MAN OF THE MATCH

- (Romania) Sabin Ilie

MATCH RULES

- 90 minutes.
- 30 minutes extra-time (15-minute intervals)
- Penalty shoot-out if scores level after extra time.
- Seven named substitutes
- Maximum of 3 substitutions.
