= Eugen Nae =

Romanian footballer

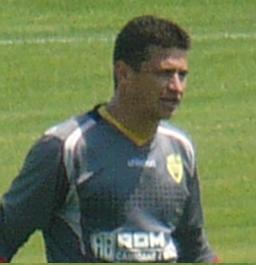

Personal information
- Full name: Eugen Gheorghe Nae
- Date of birth: 23 November 1974 (age 51)
- Place of birth: Periș, Romania
- Height: 1.86 m (6 ft 1 in)
- Position: Goalkeeper

Youth career
- –1995: Steaua București

Senior career*
Years	Team	Apps	(Gls)
1995–1996	Rocar București	29	(0)
1996–1997	Sportul Studenţesc	27	(0)
1997–2004	Steaua București	10	(0)
1998	→ Astra Ploieşti (loan)	1	(0)
1999	→ Foresta Suceava (loan)	14	(0)
1999	→ Farul Constanţa (loan)	6	(0)
2000	→ Foresta Suceava (loan)	10	(0)
2004–2007	Național București	44	(0)
2007–2008	FC Brașov	29	(0)
2009	CS Otopeni	15	(0)
Total		185	(0)

Managerial career
- 2007: Progresul București (caretaker)
- 2010: Unirea Urziceni (GK coach)
- 2010: Unirea Urziceni (caretaker)
- 2010–2011: Steaua București (GK coach)
- 2011–2012: Concordia Chiajna (GK coach)
- 2012–2013: Steaua București (GK coach)
- 2013–2017: Al Ahli (GK coach)
- 2018–2021: Jiangsu Suning (GK coach)
- 2021: FCSB (assistant)
- 2021–2025: Sharjah (GK coach)
- 2025–2026: United Arab Emirates (GK coach)
- * Club domestic league appearances and goals

Eugen Gheorghe Nae (born 23 November 1974) is a Romanian former professional footballer.

== Career ==
Eugen Nae began his football career at AS Rocar București, where he played between 1995 and 1996.

In 1996, he moved to Sportul Studenţesc, another club from Bucharest, where he played a season.

In 1997, Nae signed a contract with Steaua București, but played only ten matches for the Army Men, because he was always the substitute of Martin Tudor or Vasily Khomutovsky.

He was loaned out four times during his spell at Steaua, twice at Foresta Suceava, and once at Farul Constanţa and Astra Ploieşti.

Between 2004 and 2007, Eugen played for FC Naţional until the club's relegation to Liga II.

In 2007, he signed a contract with FC Brașov.

In 2010, he retired from professional football, and signed with Unirea Urziceni, where he was appointed as assistant coach. A few months later, Steaua gave him a chance to work at the biggest Romanian football club as the new goalkeeping coach.

== Honours ==
=== Player ===
Steaua București

- Divizia A: 2000–01
- Supercupa României: 2001

Național București

- Cupa României runner-up: 2005–06

FC Braşov

- Liga II: 2007–08
