= Stelian Carabaș =

Romanian footballer

Personal information
- Date of birth: 2 October 1974 (age 52)
- Place of birth: Medgidia, Romania
- Height: 1.74 m (5 ft 8 1/2 in)
- Position: Midfielder

Youth career
- Farul Constanța

Senior career*
Years	Team	Apps	(Gls)
1991–1997	Farul Constanța	133	(7)
1997–1999	Național București	70	(10)
2000	Steaua București	23	(2)
2001–2002	Național București	39	(2)
2002	MKE Ankaragücü	17	(0)
2003	Național București	8	(0)
2003–2004	AEL Limassol	25	(4)
2004–2005	Skoda Xanthi	27	(4)
2006–2007	Anorthosis Famagusta	33	(0)
2007–2009	Săgeata Stejaru		
Total		375	(29)

International career
1992–1993	Romania U18	9	(1)
1993–1995	Romania U21	5	(0)
1998	Romania B	1	(0)
2000	Romania	1	(0)
- * Club domestic league appearances and goals as of 1 June 2007

Stelian Carabaș (born 2 October 1974) is a retired Romanian footballer who played as a midfielder.

== Club career ==
Carabaș was born on 2 October 1974 in Medgidia, Romania and began playing junior-level football at Farul Constanța. He made his Divizia A debut on 20 June 1992 under coach Constantin Rădulescu in a 3–0 away loss to ASA Târgu Mureș. He played five games in the 1995 Intertoto Cup, scoring a goal in a 2–1 win over Pogoń Szczecin, as Farul reached the round of 16 where they were defeated by Heerenveen.

In 1997, Carabaș went to play for Național București. There, he played four matches during the 1997–98 Cup Winners' Cup, helping the club advance past Cwmbran Town, but they were defeated by Kocaelispor in the following round. Later, he made five appearances in the 1998 Intertoto Cup campaign, as The Bankers got past Hapoel Haifa and Iraklis, reaching the third round where they were defeated by Bologna. Midway through the 1999–2000 season, Carabaș left Național to join Steaua București. He played 11 matches under coach Victor Pițurcă in the first half of the 2000–01 season, before returning to Național, but Steaua still managed to win the championship without him.

In 2002, Carabaș joined Turkish club MKE Ankaragücü. He made his Süper Lig debut on 10 August under coach Mihai Stoichiță in a 1–1 draw against Yeni Malatyaspor. In the middle of the season, he left Ankaragücü to go for a third spell at Național. The team reached the 2003 Cupa României final, where Carabaș played as a starter, but coach Walter Zenga replaced him at halftime with Sergiu Radu in the 1–0 loss to Dinamo București. He accumulated a total of 273 matches and 21 goals in the competition.

For the 2003–04 season, he moved to Cypriot First Division side AEL Limassol. Afterwards, Carabaș signed with Skoda Xanthi, where he was a teammate of compatriot Florin Prunea. He made his Super League Greece debut on 18 September 2004 under coach Giannis Mantzourakis in a 3–1 victory against Aris. On 6 November, he scored his first goal in the competition in a 2–0 win over Atromitos. After the first half of the 2005–06 season, Carabaș went back to Cyprus, joining Anorthosis Famagusta. During this stint, he won the 2006–07 Cypriot Cup, but coach Temur Ketsbaia did not use him in the 3–2 victory against Omonia in the final. He then went to play for Săgeata Stejaru, helping them gain promotion from the fourth league to the third at the end of the 2007–08 season, retiring one year later.

== International career ==
From 1992 to 1995, Carabaș consistently featured for Romania's under-18 and under-21 teams, with one further appearance for the national B side coming in 1998. Carabaș played one game for Romania on 26 April 2000 under coach Emerich Jenei in a 2–0 friendly victory against Cyprus.

== Personal life ==
Carabaș is of Aromanian ethnicity. His brother, Costel, was also a footballer who managed to win the Divizia A title with Universitatea Craiova in the 1990–91 season.

== Honours ==
Steaua București

- Divizia A: 2000–01

Național București

- Cupa României runner-up: 2002–03

Anorthosis Famagusta

- Cypriot Cup: 2006–07

Săgeata Stejaru

- Liga IV: 2007–08
