= 2001 Supercupa României =

- Event: Supercupa României
Steaua București	Dinamo București
Divizia A	Cupa României
2	1
- Date: 2 March 2002
- Venue: Naţional, Bucharest
- Referee: Marian Salomir (Romania)
- Attendance: 50,000

2001 Supercupa României was the 5th edition of Romania's season opener cup competition, Supercupa României. The match was played in Bucharest at Stadionul Naţional on 2 March 2002, and was contested between Divizia A title holders, Steaua and Cupa României champions, Dinamo. The super cup final was held in mid season just before the start of its second half. This final was the most attended Supercup final in Romania with over 50,000 spectators. Steaua won the trophy for the 4th time after a double from Trică, Niculescu's goal for Dinamo being insufficient to change the outcome of the game.

== Match ==
=== Details ===
2 March 2002
17:30

Steaua București	2–1	Dinamo București
Trică 30', 86'	(Report)	Niculescu 71'

Stadionul Naţional, Bucharest
Referee: Marian Salomir (Romania)

Steaua București	Dinamo București

STEAUA BUCUREŞTI:
GK	1	(Romania) Tiberiu Lung
DF	5	(Romania) Marius Baciu (c)
DF	2	(Romania) Bogdan Nicolae		(substituted off) 73'
DF	6	(Romania) Mirel Rădoi
DF	21	(Romania) Daniel Bălan	(yellow card) 21'
MF	20	(Romania) Erik Lincar		(substituted off) 70'
MF	16	(Romania) Cătălin Liță
MF	14	(Romania) Pompiliu Stoica
MF	17	(Romania) Eugen Trică	(yellow card) 78'
FW	9	(Romania) Adrian Neaga	(yellow card) 41'	(substituted off) 90+2'
FW	14	(Romania) Claudiu Răducanu	(yellow card) 45'
Substitutes:
GK	23	(Romania) Eugen Nae
DF	15	(Romania) Mihai Neşu
DF	24	(Romania) Andrei Stânga		(substituted in) 73'
MF	25	(Romania) Sorin Paraschiv		(substituted in) 70'
MF	18	(Cameroon) Nana Falemi
FW	19	(Romania) Alexandru Piţurcă		(substituted in) 90+2'
FW	26	(Romania) Marius Vintilă
Coach:
(Romania) Victor Piţurcă

DINAMO BUCUREŞTI:
GK	1	(Romania) Bogdan Lobonţ
DF	3	(Romania) Giani Kiriţă (c)
DF	4	(Romania) Marin Vătavu	(yellow card) 41'
DF	6	(Romania) Bogdan Onuț
MF	5	(Romania) Mugur Bolohan
MF	14	(Romania) Ionuţ Ilie	(yellow card) 32'	(substituted off) 87'
MF	18	(Romania) Florin Pârvu	(yellow card) 38'	(substituted off) 38'
MF	10	(Romania) Ovidiu Stîngă
MF	3	(Romania) Iosif Tâlvan
FW	20	(Romania) Sabin Ilie		(substituted off) 46'
FW	99	(Romania) Claudiu Niculescu
Substitutes:
GK	12	(Romania) Alexandru Iliuciuc
DF	23	(Romania) Sorin Iodi
DF	17	(Romania) Dorin Semeghin
MF	10	(Romania) Iulian Tameş		(substituted in) 87'
MF	13	(Romania) Ianis Zicu
FW	19	(Romania) Claudiu Drăgan		(substituted in) 46'
FW	9	(Romania) Vlad Munteanu		(substituted in) 38'
Coach:
(Romania) Marin Ion

MATCH OFFICIALS

- Assistant referees:
  - Dan Lăzărescu
  - Nicolae Marodin
- Fourth official:

MAN OF THE MATCH

MATCH RULES

- 90 minutes.
- 30 minutes extra-time (15 minute intervals)
- Penalty shoot-out if scores level after extra time.
- Seven named substitutes
- Maximum of three substitutions.

== See also ==
- Eternal derby (Romania)
- 2001–02 Divizia A
- 2001–02 Cupa României
