= Claudiu Răducanu =

Romanian footballer

Personal information
- Full name: Claudiu Nicu Răducanu
- Date of birth: 3 December 1976 (age 49)
- Place of birth: Craiova, Romania
- Height: 1.78 m (5 ft 10 in)
- Position: Striker

Youth career
- Universitatea Craiova
- 1993–1994: CSȘ Craiova

Senior career*
| Years | Team | Apps | (Gls) |
| 1994–1999 | Extensiv Craiova | 100 | (18) |
| 2000–2003 | Steaua București | 92 | (58) |
| 2004 | Espanyol | 11 | (3) |
| 2004–2005 | Arminia Bielefeld | 5 | (0) |
| 2005–2006 | Vaslui | 15 | (1) |
| 2006 | Guangzhou Pharmaceuticals | 17 | (9) |
| 2006–2007 | Nea Salamis Famagusta | 8 | (1) |
| 2007–2008 | Sorrento | 19 | (4) |
| 2008 | Universitatea Cluj | 9 | (0) |
| 2008–2009 | Khazar Lenkoran | 9 | (1) |
| 2009 | UE Poble Sec | 7 | (0) |
| 2010 | Gavà | 9 | (0) |
| 2010 | Premià | 22 | (17) |
| 2011–2012 | PSM Makassar | 27 | (5) |
| 2013 | Transylvania Futsal Club | 34 | (21) |
| 2014 | FC Romania | 11 | (2) |
| Total | | 395 | (140) |

International career
| 2003 | Romania | 2 | (0) |
- * Club domestic league appearances and goals

Claudiu Nicu Răducanu (born 3 December 1976) is a Romanian former professional footballer who played as a striker.

== Club career ==
Răducanu was born on 3 December 1976 in Craiova, Romania and began playing football at the youth centers of Universitatea Craiova and CSȘ Craiova. He made his Divizia A debut on 24 September 1994, playing for Electroputere Craiova under coach Nicolae Ungureanu in a 4–0 away loss to Inter Sibiu. The team was relegated at the end of his first season, but he stayed with the club for a further four years in Divizia B, scoring 10 goals in the 1998–99 season to help it get promoted back to the first league.

Răducanu was transferred by Steaua București in the middle of the 1999–2000 season for $150,000. Under the guidance of coach Victor Pițurcă he helped Steaua win the 2000–01 title by being its top-scorer as he netted 12 times in 24 appearances. He also won the 2001 Supercupa României when he played the entire match in the 2–1 victory against rivals Dinamo București. Răducanu managed to become the 2002–03 top-scorer of the season with 21 goals. He scored four league goals in the derby against Dinamo which helped his side earn two victories and one draw, also netting once in a loss in the Cupa României. Răducanu also played 11 matches with seven goals for The Military Men in European competitions. Most notably, in the 2003–04 UEFA Cup edition he netted two goals in both legs of the first round as the team defeated Southampton 2–1 on aggregate. Subsequently, he scored once in the first leg of the following round where Steaua lost 2–1 on aggregate to Liverpool.

In 2004 Espanyol Barcelona paid Steaua €1.3 million for Răducanu's transfer. There, he is best remembered after scoring the victory goal in the 89th minute of his Primera División debut, as on 1 February he was sent by coach Luis Fernandez in the 69th minute to replace Pierre Womé in a 1–0 away win against Villarreal. After the game ended, he threw his shirt to the stand where the team's fans where staying, but as a lot of them tried to grab it, the railing broke and they fell on the ground. He also scored two goals in a 3–2 victory against Atlético Madrid, having a total of three goals netted in 11 Primera División matches.

Răducanu joined Arminia Bielefeld, making his Bundesliga debut on 8 August 2004 when coach Uwe Rapolder sent him in the 66th minute to replace Detlev Dammeier in a 0–0 draw against Borussia Mönchengladbach. He made a total of five appearances in the competition until the end of the season. In his following years, Răducanu became a journeyman, playing for various teams and leagues from Romania and worldwide, accumulating 154 appearances with 64 goals in the Romanian top-division, Divizia A.

== International career ==
Răducanu played two friendly games for Romania, making his debut on 30 April 2003 under coach Anghel Iordănescu in a 1–0 victory against Lithuania. His second game was a 1–0 loss to Italy.

== Controversy ==
In October 2014 Răducanu was arrested for the use of fake credit cards and for trying to bribe a police officer in Cancun, Mexico, spending one and a half months in jail.

== Honours ==
Extensiv Craiova

- Divizia B: 1998–99

Steaua București

- Divizia A: 2000–01
- Supercupa României: 2001

Individual

- Divizia A top scorer: 2002–03
