= Nana Falemi =

Cameroonian footballer (born 1974)

Personal information
- Full name: Ngassam Nana Falemi
- Date of birth: 5 May 1974 (age 52)
- Place of birth: Bucharest, Romania
- Height: 1.84 m (6 ft 0 in)
- Position: Defensive midfielder

Youth career
- 1981–1992: Steaua București
- 1992: Voința București

Senior career*
Years	Team	Apps	(Gls)
1993–1994	Viscofil București		
1995–1997	Chimia București		
1997–2000	Petrolul Ploiești	55	(2)
2000–2005	Steaua București	94	(6)
2005	Ergotelis	8	(0)
2005–2006	Vaslui	6	(0)
2006	Volyn Lutsk	7	(0)
2006	Jiangsu Shuntian	12	(2)
2007–2008	Dunărea Giurgiu	10	(1)
2008–2009	Gaz Metan Mediaș	14	(0)
Total		206	(11)

International career
2003–2004	Cameroon	5	(0)
- * Club domestic league appearances and goals

Ngassam Nana Falemi (born 5 May 1974) is a Romanian-born Cameroonian former professional footballer who played as a defensive midfielder.

== Club career ==
Falemi began playing junior-level football in 1981, aged 7 at local club Steaua, being coached by Lajos Sătmăreanu. In 1992 he joined Voința, and one year later began his senior career at Divizia C team, Viscofil, before moving to Chimia in the same league in 1995. Afterwards he signed with Petrolul Ploiești where he made his Divizia A debut on 11 November 1997 under coach Alexandru Pall in a 1–0 away victory against Steaua. He played regularly for The Yellow Wolves, most notably under the guidance of coach Marin Ion, attracting the interest of Steaua who decided to transfer him in the middle of the 1999–2000 season.

Falemi helped Steaua win the 2000–01 title, playing 25 games and scoring three goals, being coached by one of his childhood idols, Victor Pițurcă. Afterwards, Falemi made four appearances in the 2001–02 Champions League qualifying rounds, helping them get past Sloga Jugomagnat against whom he scored a goal, but got eliminated in the following round by Dynamo Kyiv. In the following season, he played in the 2003–04 UEFA Cup, as Steaua eliminated Neman Grodno and Southampton in the first two rounds, then after a 1–1 draw in the first leg against Liverpool, they lost the away leg with 1–0, bringing their campaign to an end. In his last season with The Military Men, he played four matches in the 2004–05 UEFA Cup, including a 2–0 victory in the group stage against Standard Liège. He also made five league appearances, leaving in the middle of the season to Ergotelis, Steaua managing to win the title without him.

Falemi made his Alpha Ethniki debut for Ergotelis on 12 February 2005 when coach Manolis Patemtzis sent him in the 66th minute to replace Stavros Labrakis in a 1–1 draw against Aris Thessaloniki. He stayed until the end of the season with The Yellow-Blacks, returning afterwards in Romania at Vaslui. In 2006, Volyn Lutsk paid €10,000 for his transfer from Vaslui, making his Vyshcha Liha debut on 2 April as coach Vitaliy Kvartsyanyi used him the entire match in a 2–0 away loss to Chornomorets Odesa.

Falemi left Volyn at the end of the season, moving to China League One side Jiangsu Shuntian for a short while, before returning to Romania to second league team, Dunărea Giurgiu. For the last season of his career he played for Gaz Metan Mediaș where coach Cristian Pustai wanted him. He made his last appearance in the Romanian first league on 23 November 2008 in Gaz Metan's 1–0 away loss to Farul Constanța, totaling 168 matches with eight goals in the competition.

== International career ==
Falemi played five games for Cameroon, making his debut under coach Winfried Schäfer on 27 March 2003 when he came as a substitute and replaced Bill Tchato in a 2–0 friendly victory against Madagascar. His following two appearances were a 0–0 draw against United States in the group stage and a 1–0 win over Colombia in the semi-finals of the 2003 FIFA Confederations Cup. Cameroon reached the final, but lost it with 1–0 to France, without Falemi playing in the match. His last two games for the national team were friendlies, a 0–0 draw against Japan and a 3–0 loss to Bulgaria. He was also part of Cameroon's squad for the 2004 African Cup of Nations, but did not play in any game.

== Personal life ==
Falemi was born in Bucharest, Romania to a Cameroonian father and a Romanian mother. He has a twin brother, Nomi, and a younger brother, Cody. In 1981, his parents moved to West Berlin for work, and he was raised by his maternal grandmother.

In 2018, he opened his own football school, "FC Nana Juniors".

== Honours ==
Steaua București

- Divizia A: 2000–01, 2004–05
- Supercupa României: 2001

Cameroon

- FIFA Confederations Cup runner-up: 2003
