= Florentin Dumitru =

Romanian footballer

Personal information
- Date of birth: 25 May 1977 (age 49)
- Place of birth: Bolintin-Vale, Romania
- Height: 1.67 m (5 ft 6 in)
- Position: Right back

Youth career
- –1996: Sportul Studențesc

Senior career*
Years	Team	Apps	(Gls)
1996–1998	Sportul Studențesc	61	(3)
1998–1999	Astra Ploiești	58	(0)
2000–2005	Steaua București	142	(8)
2006	Jiul Petroșani	4	(0)
2006–2007	Național București	18	(0)
2007–2008	Concordia Chiajna	16	(0)
2010	Concordia Chiajna	19	(2)
2010–2012	Petrolul Ploiești	55	(3)
Total		373	(16)

International career
1997–1999	Romania U21	15	(0)
2000–2004	Romania	17	(0)

Managerial career
- 2015–2016: Voluntari (sporting director)
- 2018: Voluntari (president)
- 2019: Sportul Snagov (sporting director)
- 2019: CSA Steaua București (sporting director)
- * Club domestic league appearances and goals

Florentin Dumitru (born 25 May 1977) is a Romanian former footballer who played as a right back.

== Career statistics ==
=== International ===
Appearances and goals by national team and year
National team	Year	Apps	Goals
Romania	2000	6	0
Romania	2001	5	0
Romania	2002	1	0
Romania	2003	4	0
Romania	2004	1	0
Total		17	0

== Honours ==
Steaua București

- Divizia A: 2000–01, 2004–05
- Supercupa României: 2001

Petrolul Ploieşti

- Liga II: 2010–11
