= Eugen Trică =

Romanian footballer and manager

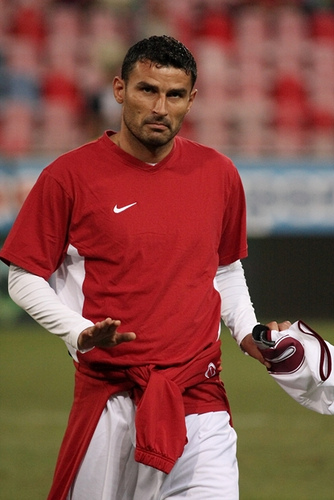
- Trică with CFR Cluj in August 2009

Personal information
- Date of birth: 5 August 1976 (age 50)
- Place of birth: Teslui, Romania
- Height: 1.79 m (5 ft 10 in)
- Position: Attacking midfielder

Youth career
- 1988–1993: Universitatea Craiova

Senior career*
Years	Team	Apps	(Gls)
1994–1998	Universitatea Craiova	91	(14)
1998–2003	Steaua București	130	(21)
2003–2005	Litex Lovech	54	(22)
2005–2006	Maccabi Tel Aviv	10	(1)
2006–2007	CSKA Sofia	34	(17)
2007–2008	CFR Cluj	46	(15)
2009	Anorthosis	12	(1)
2009	CFR Cluj	1	(0)
2009–2010	Universitatea Craiova	16	(2)
2010–2011	Concordia Chiajna	22	(6)
Total		416	(99)

International career
1996–1998	Romania U21	20	(6)
1999–2007	Romania	4	(0)

Managerial career
- 2010: Universitatea Craiova (sporting director)
- 2010: Universitatea Craiova (caretaker)
- 2011: Concordia Chiajna (sporting director)
- 2012–2013: Juventus București
- 2013: CFR Cluj
- 2013: Al-Nahda (assistant)
- 2013–2014: UTA Arad
- 2014: Juventus București
- 2015: CFR Cluj
- 2015: Metalul Reșița
- 2015–2016: Ittihad (assistant)
- 2017–2018: Politehnica Iași (assistant)
- 2019: Sportul Snagov
- 2019–2020: FC U Craiova
- 2020–2021: Turris Turnu Măgurele
- 2021: FC U Craiova
- 2021: Viitorul Târgu Jiu
- 2021: FC U Craiova
- 2022: Viitorul Târgu Jiu
- 2022: Metaloglobus București
- 2022–2023: Concordia Chiajna
- 2023: Gloria Băneasa
- 2023–2024: CSM Alexandria
- 2024: FC U Craiova
- 2024: Sohar
- 2025: Lovech
- * Club domestic league appearances and goals

Eugen Trică (born 5 August 1976) is a Romanian professional manager and former footballer who played as a midfielder.

== Club career ==
=== Universitatea Craiova ===
Trică was born on 5 August 1976 in the Romanian village of Teslui, where he spent his early years. He was raised mainly by his grandparents until age 7, when he moved to Craiova for school. Shortly after arriving in Craiova, his father noticed his talent when he saw him playing football in the neighborhood, so he took him to the youth center of local club Universitatea. Trică made his Liga I debut on 17 June 1995 under coach Victor Pițurcă in "U" Craiova's 5–4 loss to Electroputere Craiova. The club reached the 1998 Cupa României final where coach José Ramón Alexanko used him the entire match in the 1–0 loss to Rapid București. During this period he earned the nickname José after teammate Ionel Gane compared him to José Mari Bakero.

=== Steaua București ===
Trică joined Steaua București in 1998. He won the 1998–99 Cupa României after being introduced by coach Emerich Jenei in the final's overtime against Rapid, a match decided by a penalty shoot-out where he netted his spot kick. In the 2000–01 season, he also won the championship with The Military Men, being used by coach Pițurcă in 30 games in which he scored seven goals. Subsequently, he netted two goals in Steaua's 2–1 victory against rivals Dinamo București in the 2001 Supercupa României.

=== Litex Lovech, Maccabi Tel Aviv and CSKA Sofia ===
Trică joined Litex Lovech in 2003 where over the course of two seasons he scored 22 goals in 54 league matches. He helped the club win the 2004–05 Bulgarian Cup, coach Ljupko Petrović using him the entire match in the penalty shoot-out victory against CSKA Sofia in the final where he scored the first spot kick. Subsequently, he joined the squad of Israeli side Maccabi Tel Aviv in 2005. After a few months, he returned to Bulgaria, this time at CSKA Sofia where he played alongside fellow Romanians Florentin Petre and Alexandru Pițurcă. There, he won the 2005–06 Bulgarian Cup and the 2006 Bulgarian Supercup. The latter trophy was secured after he played the entire match under coach Plamen Markov in the penalty shoot-out victory against rivals Levski Sofia in which Trică netted the first spot kick. Trică was one of the highest-scoring foreign players in the Bulgarian league as in the 98 appearances made in the competition he had 39 goals to his name.

=== CFR Cluj and Anorthosis ===
In 2007, Trică returned to Romania, signing with CFR Cluj. There, he helped the club win the championship and the cup for the first time in its history in the 2007–08 season, and Trică was the team's top-scorer, netting 13 goals in 31 league matches under coach Ioan Andone. Coach Andone also sent him in the 71st minute to replace Manuel José in the 2–1 victory against Unirea Urziceni in the Cupa României final. Subsequently, he played five games in the 2008–09 Champions League group stage with The Railway Men, and in the first match, he provided Emmanuel Culio with two assists, leading to a historical 2–1 victory at Stadio Olimpico against AS Roma. His performances in 2008 earned him the fifth place in the Romanian Footballer of the Year award. Trică moved in 2009 to Anorthosis in Cyprus. However, he shortly returned to CFR Cluj where he won the 2009 Supercupa României after coach Toni Conceição introduced him in the 68th minute to replace Sixto Peralta in the penalty shoot-out win against Unirea Urziceni.

=== Universitatea Craiova and Concordia Chiajna ===
In 2009, Trică made a comeback to his first club Universitatea Craiova. However, after a year, in 2010, he joined Concordia Chiajna in Liga II which he helped gain a first-ever promotion to Liga I. On 15 October 2011, following Concordia's 4–0 loss to his former club CFR Cluj, Trică decided to end his playing career. Through his career, Trică earned a total of 289 matches with 51 goals scored in Liga I and 30 appearances with seven goals in European competitions.

== International career ==
Trică was part of Romania's under-21 side that managed a first-ever qualification to a European Championship in 1998, which Romania subsequently hosted. In the final tournament that was composed of eight teams, coach Victor Pițurcă used him only in the 2–1 loss to Russia where he scored his side's goal, as they finished in last place.

Trică played four games for Romania, making his debut on 3 March 1999 when coach Pițurcă introduced him in the 74th minute to replace Dennis Șerban in a 2–0 friendly victory against Estonia. His following game was a 1–0 win in a friendly against Ukraine. His last two were appearances in the successful Euro 2008 qualifiers, a 3–1 victory against Belarus and a 1–0 loss to Bulgaria.

== Managerial career ==
Trică started his coaching career in 2012 at Juventus București, after which he coached various other teams in Romania and abroad, including as an assistant coach. His biggest achievements were a runner-up position in a Cupa României final with CFR Cluj, and earning two promotions from the third league to the second and then from the second to the first with FC U Craiova.

== Personal life ==
Trică was married to Lorena, daughter of Ilie Balaci, one of Romania's best football players. They divorced in 2015. Their son, Atanas Trică, is also a footballer.

== Playing statistics ==
Romania national team
Year	Apps	Goals
1999	1	0
2001	1	0
2007	2	0
Total	4	0

== Honours ==
=== Player ===
Universitatea Craiova

- Cupa României runner-up: 1997–98

Steaua București

- Divizia A: 2000–01
- Cupa României: 1998–99
- Supercupa României: 2001

Litex Lovech

- Bulgarian Cup: 2003–04

CSKA Sofia

- Bulgarian Cup: 2005–06
- Bulgarian Super Cup: 2006

CFR Cluj

- Liga I: 2007–08
- Cupa României: 2007–08
- Supercupa României: 2009

Individual

- Romanian Footballer of the Year (fifth place): 2008

=== Manager ===
CFR Cluj

- Cupa României runner-up: 2012–13

FC U Craiova

- Liga II: 2020–21
- Liga III: 2019–20
