= Bogdan Nicolae =

Romanian footballer

Personal information
- Full name: Bogdan Gheorghe Nicolae
- Date of birth: 26 April 1976 (age 50)
- Place of birth: București, Romania
- Height: 1.84 m (6 ft 0 in)
- Position: Defender

Senior career*
Years	Team	Apps	(Gls)
1994–1995	Rocar București	30	(0)
1995–1999	Gloria Bistriţa	84	(3)
1999–2002	Astra Ploieşti	65	(0)
2002	Steaua București	9	(0)
2002–2005	FC Brașov	74	(1)
2005–2006	Hapoel Bnei Sakhnin	14	(1)
2006	FC Vaslui	9	(0)
2006–2007	CS Otopeni	33	(2)
2007–2010	FC Brașov	58	(4)
2010–2011	Juventus București	35	(3)
Total		383	(10)
- * Club domestic league appearances and goals as of 7 May 2016

Bogdan Nicolae (born 26 April 1976, București) is a former Romanian footballer.

== Honours ==
Steaua București

- Supercupa României: 2001

FC Braşov

- Liga II: 2007–08

Juventus București

- Liga III: 2009–10
