= 2000–01 Divizia A =

83rd season of top-tier football league in Romania

Divizia A
- Season: 2000–01
- Champions: Steaua București
- Relegated: Rocar București; Gaz Metan Mediaș
- Champions League: Steaua București
- UEFA Cup: Dinamo București; Brașov; Rapid București
- Intertoto Cup: Gloria Bistrița; Universitatea Craiova
- Matches: 240
- Goals: 626 (2.61 per match)
- Top goalscorer: Marius Niculae (20)
- Biggest home win: Național 5–0 Foresta; Steaua 5–0 Oțelul
- Biggest away win: Ceahlăul 0–3 Steaua; Ceahlăul 1–4 Craiova; Național 0–3 Bistrița; Oțelul 1–4 Rapid; Rocar 1–4 Ceahlăul
- Highest scoring: Dinamo 4–5 Foresta; Rocar 4–5 Steaua
- Longest winning run: Brașov, Rapid, Gloria (4)
- Longest unbeaten run: Steaua (8)
- Longest losing run: Gaz Metan (5)

The 2000–01 Divizia A was the eighty-third season of Divizia A, the top-level football league of Romania. Season began in August 2000 and ended in May 2001. Steaua București was crowned as champion for the 21st time.

== Team changes ==
=== Relegated ===
The teams that were relegated to Divizia B at the end of the previous season:

- Farul Constanța
- FC Onești
- CSM Reșița
- Extensiv Craiova

=== Promoted ===
The teams that were promoted from Divizia B at the start of the season:

- Foresta Fălticeni
- Gaz Metan Mediaș

=== Venues ===
Steaua București	Universitatea Craiova	Rapid București	FCM Bacău
Steaua	Ion Oblemenco	Giulești-Valentin Stănescu	Municipal
Capacity: 28,365	Capacity: 25,252	Capacity: 19,100	Capacity: 17,500
Dinamo București	Argeș Pitești	Național București	Petrolul Ploiești
Dinamo	Municipal	Cotroceni	Ilie Oană
Capacity: 15,032	Capacity: 15,000	Capacity: 14,542	Capacity: 14,000
Oțelul Galați	2000–01 Divizia A (Romania) Location of Bucharest teams.		Ceahlăul Piatra Neamț
Oțelul	2000–01 Divizia A (Romania) Location of Bucharest teams.		Ceahlăul
Capacity: 13,500	2000–01 Divizia A (Romania) Location of Bucharest teams.		Capacity: 12,500
Foresta Fălticeni	2000–01 Divizia A (Romania) Location of Bucharest teams.		FC Brașov
Areni	2000–01 Divizia A (Romania) Location of Bucharest teams.		Tineretului
Capacity: 12,500	2000–01 Divizia A (Romania) Location of Bucharest teams.		Capacity: 10,000
Gloria Bistrița	Astra Ploiești	Gaz Metan Mediaș	Rocar București
Gloria	Astra	Gaz Metan	Rocar
Capacity: 7,800	Capacity: 7,000	Capacity: 6,000	Capacity: 6,000

=== Personnel and kits ===
Team	Head coach	Captain	Kit manufacturer	Shirt Sponsor
Argeș Pitești	(Romania) Marian Bondrea	(Romania) Cristian Bălașa	Erreà	Dacia
Astra Ploiești	(Romania) Marin Ion	(Romania) Bogdan Nicolae	Joma	Astra Română, Asirom
Brașov	(Romania) Gabriel Stan	(Romania) Cosmin Bodea	Valsport	Prescon
Ceahlăul Piatra Neamț	(Romania) Florin Marin	(Romania) Radu Lefter	Ancada	Rifil
Dinamo București	(Romania) Cornel Dinu	(Romania) Cătălin Hâldan / Adrian Mihalcea	Lotto	Cosmorom
Universitatea Craiova	(Romania) Nicolae Ungureanu	(Romania) Claudiu Niculescu	Erreà	Vincon
FCM Bacău	(Romania) Gheorghe Poenaru	(Romania) Marius Gireadă	Legea	Sonoma
Foresta Suceava	(Romania) Marin Barbu	(Romania) Ovidiu Ciobanu	Ancada	—
Gaz Metan Mediaș	(Romania) Silviu Dumitrescu	(Romania) Flavius Șomfălean	Joma	Transgaz
Gloria Bistrița	(Romania) Constantin Cârstea	(Romania) Vasile Popa	Ancada	Darimex
Național București	(Romania) Cosmin Olăroiu	(Romania) Cătălin Liță	Kappa	—
Oțelul Galați	(Romania) Ilie Dumitrescu	(Romania) Cătălin Tofan	Adidas	Sidex
Petrolul Ploiești	(Romania) Victor Roșca	(Romania) Dinu Todoran	Adidas	Petrom
Rapid București	(Romania) Mircea Rednic	(Romania) Nicolae Stanciu	Erreà	Connex
Rocar București	(Romania) Dumitru Dumitriu	(Romania) Cornel Cristescu	Erreà	Fulbier
Steaua București	(Romania) Victor Pițurcă	(Romania) Miodrag Belodedici	Adidas	BCR

== League table ==
Pos	Team	Pld	W	D	L	GF	GA	GD	Pts	Qualification or relegation
1	Steaua București (C)	30	17	9	4	56	32	+24	60	Qualification to Champions League second qualifying round
2	Dinamo București	30	15	6	9	56	44	+12	51	Qualification to UEFA Cup qualifying round
3	Brașov	30	15	5	10	33	25	+8	50	Qualification to UEFA Cup qualifying round
4	Rapid București	30	13	10	7	38	25	+13	49	Qualification to UEFA Cup qualifying round
5	Argeș Pitești	30	12	10	8	42	42	0	46	
6	Gloria Bistrița	30	13	4	13	44	42	+2	43 (Note: GLO 3-0 PRO; PRO 0-3 GLO)	Qualification to Intertoto Cup first round
7	Național București	30	13	4	13	40	40	0	43	
8	Universitatea Craiova	30	11	8	11	34	38	−4	41	Qualification to Intertoto Cup first round
9	Petrolul Ploiești	30	12	4	14	34	36	−2	40 (Note: AST 0-0 PET; PET 3-1 AST)	
10	Astra Ploiești	30	11	7	12	41	36	+5	40	
11	Ceahlăul Piatra Neamț	30	9	11	10	36	41	−5	38 (Note: OTE 1-1 CEA; CEA 0-0 OTE)	
12	Oțelul Galați	30	10	8	12	33	39	−6	38	
13	Foresta Fălticeni (R)	30	8	12	10	39	43	−4	36	Qualification to relegation play-offs
14	Bacău	30	9	7	14	38	45	−7	34 (Note: BAC 3-0 ROC; ROC 2-0 BAC)	Qualification to relegation play-offs
15	Rocar București (R)	30	10	4	16	41	56	−15	34	Relegation to Divizia B
16	Gaz Metan Mediaș (R)	30	3	9	18	21	42	−21	18	Relegation to Divizia B

Source: LT (in Romanian)
Rules for classification: 1) points; 2) head-to-head points; 3) head-to-head goal difference; 4) head-to-head goals scored; 5) goal difference; 6) number of goals scored.
(C) Champions; (R) Relegated

== Promotion / relegation play-off ==
Team 1	Agg.	Team 2	1st leg	2nd leg
Farul Constanța	3–3 (4–3 p)	FCM Bacău	2–1	1–2 (a.e.t.)
FC Baia Mare	2–2 (a)	Foresta Fălticeni	1–0	1–2

Note: FC Baia Mare sold their 2001–02 Divizia A place to FCM Bacău.

== Positions by round ==
Team ╲ Round	1	2	3	4	5	6	7	8	9	10	11	12	13	14	15	16	17	18	19	20	21	22	23	24	25	26	27	28	29	30
Argeș Pitești	15	11	5	9	6	10	6	7	7	7	5	6	5	3	3	2	2	3	6	3	2	3	2	2	3	4	4	4	5	5
Astra Ploiești	13	16	13	14	12	12	13	14	12	10	10	8	9	9	10	11	11	12	10	9	10	10	10	9	10	7	9	9	11	10
Bacău	9	8	7	4	2	4	7	9	10	12	12	14	11	14	15	15	15	15	14	15	15	15	15	15	15	15	15	14	13	14
Brașov	10	10	4	3	5	8	5	5	5	3	6	3	4	7	5	7	8	8	5	5	6	5	6	4	4	2	2	3	3	3
Ceahlăul Piatra Neamț	16	15	15	16	16	16	16	15	15	15	15	15	15	15	14	12	14	13	13	12	12	11	12	14	11	8	10	11	9	11
Universitatea Craiova	8	6	3	2	3	2	2	2	1	1	2	2	2	4	6	5	5	5	7	8	9	8	9	8	9	10	11	8	10	8
Dinamo București	3	2	11	13	9	7	8	10	9	5	4	5	8	6	4	4	3	2	2	2	3	2	3	3	2	3	3	2	2	2
Foresta Fălticeni	5	3	9	5	11	9	10	11	11	11	11	9	6	5	7	8	6	6	9	11	11	12	11	13	12	13	13	13	15	13
Gaz Metan Mediaș	2	7	6	10	14	14	15	16	16	16	16	16	16	16	16	16	16	16	16	16	16	16	16	16	16	16	16	16	16	16
Gloria Bistrița	14	14	16	12	15	13	14	12	13	13	13	11	13	10	11	10	9	9	4	7	8	7	7	7	7	6	6	6	6	6
Oțelul Galați	1	9	12	8	4	6	3	4	4	6	7	10	12	13	12	13	12	10	11	10	7	9	8	10	8	11	12	12	12	12
Petrolul Ploiești	11	13	10	7	10	5	4	3	3	4	3	4	3	2	2	3	4	7	3	6	5	6	5	6	6	9	7	10	7	9
Național București	12	12	14	15	13	15	12	13	14	14	14	12	14	11	13	14	13	14	15	14	14	14	13	11	13	12	8	7	8	7
Rapid București	4	4	8	11	8	11	11	8	8	9	8	7	7	8	8	6	7	4	8	4	4	4	4	5	5	5	5	5	4	4
Rocar București	6	1	2	6	7	3	9	6	6	8	9	13	10	12	9	9	10	11	12	13	13	13	14	12	14	14	14	15	14	15
Steaua București	7	5	1	1	1	1	1	1	2	2	1	1	1	1	1	1	1	1	1	1	1	1	1	1	1	1	1	1	1	1

Source: LT (in Romanian)

== Results ==
Home \ Away	ARG	AST	BAC	BRA	CEA	UCR	DIN	FOR	GAZ	GBI	OȚE	PET	NAT	RAP	ROC	STE
Argeș Pitești	—	4–2	2–2	1–0	2–1	3–0	1–0	1–1	2–1	1–1	2–0	1–0	3–1	0–2	1–0	1–1
Astra Ploiești	2–0	—	1–1	2–0	1–1	2–0	4–3	3–0	3–1	2–0	2–1	0–0	0–0	0–1	0–2	3–0
Bacău	3–1	2–1	—	1–1	1–0	3–1	1–1	1–1	2–1	2–0	4–2	1–2	3–2	0–2	3–0	0–2
Brașov	0–0	1–0	2–0	—	1–1	1–2	1–0	3–1	2–0	2–0	0–0	1–0	3–2	1–0	2–0	2–2
Ceahlăul Piatra Neamț	3–0	0–0	3–0	2–1	—	1–4	3–3	1–1	1–1	3–2	0–0	1–0	2–1	1–0	2–0	0–3
Universitatea Craiova	1–1	0–2	1–0	1–0	1–1	—	1–3	1–0	2–1	2–4	3–1	2–0	2–0	0–0	3–1	1–0
Dinamo București	2–1	3–2	2–0	2–0	2–2	3–1	—	4–5	4–2	3–1	1–2	2–3	1–0	0–0	2–0	1–0
Foresta Fălticeni	2–2	4–2	1–1	1–0	3–0	0–0	0–1	—	0–0	2–0	1–1	3–1	0–1	1–0	4–1	1–1
Gaz Metan Mediaș	2–2	0–0	0–0	0–1	3–0	1–0	0–2	1–1	—	2–1	0–0	0–1	1–2	0–0	1–1	1–3
Gloria Bistrița	2–2	4–3	2–1	1–0	2–0	1–1	3–1	3–2	1–0	—	2–0	2–0	3–0	0–1	2–0	1–1
Oțelul Galați	4–1	1–0	2–1	3–1	1–1	1–1	0–0	0–0	3–0	2–0	—	0–2	1–2	1–4	2–1	0–1
Petrolul Ploiești	2–3	3–1	3–1	0–1	2–1	1–0	3–1	0–0	1–0	3–0	0–1	—	2–0	1–2	1–1	1–1
Național București	3–0	2–0	2–1	0–1	1–0	1–1	1–3	5–0	1–0	0–3	1–0	2–0	—	2–1	2–1	1–2
Rapid București	0–1	0–0	1–0	1–3	1–1	1–1	2–2	4–1	2–1	1–0	2–1	3–1	2–2	—	2–3	1–1
Rocar București	1–0	1–0	2–0	1–2	1–4	2–0	1–3	3–2	2–1	4–3	1–3	4–1	2–2	0–2	—	4–5
Steaua București	3–3	1–3	4–3	1–0	3–0	3–1	4–1	2–1	2–0	1–0	5–0	1–0	2–1	0–0	1–1	—

Source: LT (in Romanian)
Legend: Blue = home team win; Yellow = draw; Red = away team win.

== Top goalscorers ==
Position	Player	Club	Goals
1	Marius Niculae	Dinamo București	20
2	Cătălin Cursaru	Bacău	15
3	Claudiu Niculescu	Universitatea Craiova	14
3	Robert Niță	Foresta Fălticeni / Rapid București	14
5	Constantin Bârsan	Gloria Bistrița	13
5	Daniel Pancu	Rapid București	13
7	Claudiu Răducanu	Steaua București	12

== Champion squad ==
Steaua București

Goalkeepers: Martin Tudor (30 / 0); Tiberiu Lung (1 / 0); Eugen Nae (1 / 0).
Defenders: Marius Baciu (23 / 1); Daniel Bălan (9 / 0); Miodrag Belodedici (14 / 1); Valeriu Bordeanu (5 / 0); Florentin Dumitru (28 / 1); Albert Duro (Albania) (3 / 0); Dumitru Mitriță (14 / 0); Iulian Miu (16 / 0); Mirel Rădoi (25 / 1); Pompiliu Stoica (29 / 1); Marius Vintilă (1 / 0).
Midfielders: Sorin Paraschiv (23 / 2); Eugen Trică (26 / 7); Stelian Carabaș (11 / 0); Nana Falemi (Cameroon) (25 / 3); Ovidiu Iacov (2 / 1); Erik Lincar (21 / 1); Cătălin Liță (14 / 1).
Forwards: Cristian Ciocoiu (24 / 3); Ionel Dănciulescu (27 / 6); Radu Niculescu (10 / 3); Claudiu Răducanu (24 / 12); Ion Vlădoiu (13 / 10); Alexandru Pițurcă (1 / 1); Daniel Oprița (1 / 0).
(league appearances and goals listed in brackets)

Manager: Victor Pițurcă.

== Attendances ==
#	Club	Average
1	Steaua	12,400
2	Foresta	11,357
3	Craiova	10,700
4	Bacău	8,933
5	FC Rapid	8,667
6	Brașov	8,433
7	Oțelul	6,867
8	Argeș	6,367
9	Dinamo 1948	6,047
10	Ceahlăul	5,167
11	Petrolul	5,033
12	Astra	4,467
13	Gloria	3,933
14	Gaz Metan	3,600
15	Rocar	3,467
16	Național	3,320
