= Marius Baciu =

Romanian footballer and manager

Personal information
- Full name: Marius Achim Baciu
- Date of birth: 1 May 1975 (age 51)
- Place of birth: Mediaș, Romania
- Height: 1.81 m (5 ft 11 in)
- Position: Defender

Youth career
- –1992: Gaz Metan Mediaș
- 1992–1993: Inter Sibiu

Senior career*
Years	Team	Apps	(Gls)
1992–1996	Inter Sibiu	57	(1)
1993–1994	→ Gaz Metan Mediaș (loan)	24	(0)
1996–2002	Steaua București	140	(8)
2002–2004	Lille	34	(1)
2004–2005	Rot-Weiß Oberhausen	24	(3)
2005	Panserraikos	14	(0)
2006–2007	Oțelul Galați	36	(2)
2007	Universitatea Cluj	9	(0)
2008	Gaz Metan Mediaș	11	(0)
Total		349	(15)

International career
1996–1997	Romania U21	12	(2)
2002	Romania	1	(0)

Managerial career
- 2009: Voința Sibiu
- 2010: Pandurii Târgu Jiu
- 2010: Unirea Alba Iulia
- 2011: Silvania Şimleu Silvaniei
- 2011: CSMS Iași
- 2011–2012: Flacăra Făget
- 2012: Vaslui (assistant)
- 2012–2013: SC Bacău
- 2014–2015: Academica Argeș
- 2015: Concordia Chiajna
- 2017: Voința Turnu Măgurele
- 2017–2019: Daco-Getica București
- 2019: Turris Turnu Măgurele
- 2020: Sohar
- 2020–2021: Al-Taqadom
- 2021–2022: Al-Arabi
- 2022–2023: Al-Nahda
- 2024–2026: Păușești-Otăsău (technical director)
- 2026: FCSB
- * Club domestic league appearances and goals

Marius Achim Baciu (born 1 May 1975) is a Romanian football manager and former professional player.

== Club career ==
Baciu started his career playing as a youth for Gaz Metan Mediaș, before joining the squad of Inter Sibiu as a professional player in 1992. One year later he was loaned to his former team Gaz Metan Mediaș, rejoining Inter Sibiu in 1994.

In 1996, FC Inter Sibiu was relegated from Divizia A, but Baciu, then 21, was signed by Steaua București winning the championship in 1997 and 1998 and the Cupa României in 1999. After a new championship in 2001, Baciu refused to renew his contract with Steaua and as a result, he was sent to play for the reserves team. During his years at Steaua, Baciu was also the team's captain.

In 2002, he left Steaua to play in France for Lille OSC but after two mediocre seasons he was released from his contract and signed with the German squad Rot-Weiß Oberhausen as a free agent.

Between 2006 and 2007 he was part of the Oțelul Galați squad. In 2007, Baciu signed a contract with the new promoted Universitatea Cluj.

== Coaching career ==
In summer 2011, Baciu signed a two-year contract with Romanian side CSMS Iași. In August 2011, he was released from his contract. Since he started his coaching career Baciu has achieved great praise for his consistent results specially when taking Vointa Sibiu from second Romanian Division to First Romanian League and keeping the team in the first places in the championship.

While at Concordia Chiajna in 2015, Baciu successfully managed to keep the team away from the relegation in his last season in charge with the team.

== Playing statistics ==
Appearances and goals by national team and year
National team	Year	Apps	Goals
Romania
Romania	2002	1	0
Total		1	0

== Managerial statistics ==
As of 19 September 2026

Team	From	To	Record							
Team	From	To	G	W	D	L	GF	GA	GD	Win %
Voința Sibiu	1 July 2009	31 December 2009	19	14	4	1	31	11	+20	73.68
Pandurii Târgu Jiu	1 January 2010	30 June 2010	17	2	8	7	5	13	−8	11.76
Unirea Alba Iulia	26 July 2010	25 October 2010	10	3	2	5	6	10	−4	30.00
Silvania Şimleu Silvaniei	24 January 2011	15 June 2011	13	0	1	12	0	36	−36	0.00
CSMS Iași	16 June 2011	28 August 2011	3	1	0	2	3	6	−3	33.33
Flacăra Făget	18 October 2011	13 June 2012	21	4	5	12	24	39	−15	19.05
SC Bacău	17 September 2012	25 June 2013	19	13	4	2	45	17	+28	68.42
Academica Argeș	20 June 2014	15 March 2015	20	12	4	4	39	16	+23	60.00
Concordia Chiajna	6 April 2015	1 September 2015	19	6	4	9	23	28	−5	31.58
Voința Turnu Măgurele	29 July 2017	21 December 2017	12	8	3	1	21	7	+14	66.67
Daco-Getica București	22 December 2017	24 October 2019	71	16	18	37	73	120	−47	22.54
Turris Turnu Măgurele	25 October 2019	27 December 2019	7	2	3	2	11	13	−2	28.57
Sohar	1 January 2020	26 June 2020	10	3	1	6	6	10	−4	30.00
Al-Taqadom	1 July 2020	10 April 2021	26	4	13	9	27	34	−7	15.38
Al-Arabi	1 June 2021	30 April 2022	27	17	9	1	43	16	+27	62.96
Al-Nahda	1 July 2022	30 June 2023	30	5	8	17	25	44	−19	16.67
FCSB	19 May 2026	20 September 2026	15	6	3	6	27	28	−1	40.00
Total			339	116	90	133	409	448	−39	34.22

== Honours ==
=== Player ===
Steaua București

- Divizia A: 1996–97, 1997–98, 2000–01
- Cupa României: 1996–97, 1998–99
- Supercupa României: 1998, 2001

Gaz Metan Mediaș

- Liga II: 2007–08

=== Coach ===
SC Bacău

- Liga III: 2012–13

Al-Arabi

- Saudi Second Division: 2021–22
