= Alexandru Pițurcă =

Romanian footballer

Personal information
- Full name: Alexandru Victorio Pițurcă
- Date of birth: 28 October 1983 (age 42)
- Place of birth: Bucharest, Romania
- Height: 1.88 m (6 ft 2 in)
- Position: Forward

Youth career
- 1993–2000: Steaua București

Senior career*
Years	Team	Apps	(Gls)
2000–2004	Steaua București	19	(1)
2003	→ Jahn Regensburg (loan)	0	(0)
2003	→ Jahn Regensburg II (loan)	6	(2)
2004–2005	FC Caracal	27	(8)
2005–2006	Universitatea Craiova	11	(0)
2006–2007	CSKA Sofia	4	(2)
2007–2009	Pandurii Târgu Jiu	51	(8)
2009–2010	FC Brașov	5	(0)
2010–2011	Universitatea Craiova	25	(6)
2011	Khazar Lankaran	4	(0)
Total		279	(27)
- * Club domestic league appearances and goals

Alexandru Victorio Pițurcă (born 28 October 1983) is a Romanian former professional footballer who played as a forward.

== Career ==
Pițurcă was born on 28 October 1983 in Bucharest, Romania and began playing junior-level football in 1993 at Steaua București. He made his Divizia A debut on 13 June 2001, playing under the guidance of his father Victor in a 3–3 draw against Argeș Pitești in which he scored one goal. That was his only appearance, as the team won the title at the end of the season. He won another trophy when his father sent him in extra time to replace Adrian Neaga in the 2–1 win over rivals Dinamo București in the 2001 Supercupa României. Afterwards, Pițurcă made two appearances in the 2001–02 Champions League qualifying rounds, helping them get past Sloga Jugomagnat, but got eliminated in the following round by Dynamo Kyiv. He was loaned in 2003 to 2. Bundesliga team Jahn Regensburg, but played there only for the club's satellite team.

From 2004 until 2006 he spent two seasons in Divizia B at FC Caracal and Universitatea Craiova, helping the latter win promotion to Divizia A. In 2006 Pițurcă signed with CSKA Sofia, where he played alongside fellow Romanians Florentin Petre and Eugen Trică. He made his debut in the Bulgarian league on 1 October 2006 when coach Plamen Markov sent him in the 68th minute to replace Robert Petrov in a 1–0 away loss to Botev Plovdiv. On 28 October he scored a brace in a 6–0 win over Chernomorets Burgas. Those were his only goals in the four league appearances he made for CSKA. In the following years he went to play in the Romanian first league for Pandurii Târgu Jiu, FC Brașov and Universitatea Craiova. At the latter, on 14 November 2010, he netted a double in a 2–2 draw against Dinamo. On 3 December 2010, he made his last Divizia A appearance in "U" Craiova's 2–1 away loss to CFR Cluj, totaling 100 matches with 15 goals in the competition. Pițurcă retired in 2011 at age 27, after playing in the Azerbaijan Premier League for Khazar Lankaran under coach Mircea Rednic.

== Personal life ==
His father, Victor, was a footballer and a coach.

== Honours ==
Steaua București

- Divizia A: 2000–01
- Supercupa României: 2001

Universitatea Craiova

- Divizia B: 2005–06

Khazar Lankaran

- Azerbaijan Cup: 2010–11
