= Iulian Miu =

Romanian footballer

Personal information
- Full name: Iulian Ilie Miu
- Date of birth: 21 January 1976 (age 50)
- Place of birth: Roşiorii de Vede, Romania
- Height: 1.82 m (6 ft 0 in)
- Position: Left-back

Senior career*
Years	Team	Apps	(Gls)
1993–1994	Progresul București	1	(0)
1995–1996	Foresta Fălticeni	31	(0)
1996–2002	Steaua București	149	(4)
2002–2003	FCM Bacău	14	(1)
2003–2006	Bursaspor	86	(3)
2007	UTA Arad	2	(0)
2008	Concordia Chiajna	5	(0)
Total		288	(8)

International career
2001–2003	Romania	8	(0)

Managerial career
- 2019–: Steaua București (assistant)
- * Club domestic league appearances and goals

Iulian Ilie Miu (born 21 January 1976) is a Romanian former professional footballer who played as a left-back for Liga I clubs such as Steaua București, and abroad in Turkey at Bursaspor.

== Honours ==
Steaua București

- Diviza A: 1996–97, 1997–98, 2000–01
- Cupa României: 1996–97, 1998–99
- Supercupa României: 1998

Bursaspor

- Turkish Second League: 2005–06
