= Martin Tudor (footballer) =

Romanian footballer (1976–2020)

Personal information
- Full name: Gheorghe Martin Tudor
- Date of birth: 10 June 1976
- Place of birth: Avrig, Romania
- Date of death: 30 March 2020 (aged 43)
- Place of death: Reșița, Romania
- Height: 1.78 m (5 ft 10 in)
- Position: Goalkeeper

Senior career*
Years	Team	Apps	(Gls)
1996–1997	Jiul Petroșani	1	(0)
1997–1999	Olimpia Satu Mare	46	(0)
1999–2005	Steaua București	126	(0)
2005–2007	CFR Cluj	21	(0)
2007–2008	Universitatea Cluj	10	(0)
2009–2010	Steaua II București	0	(0)
Total		204	(0)

Managerial career
- 2008–2010: Steaua București (GK coach)
- 2010–2011: FC U Craiova (GK coach)
- 2011: Romania (GK coach)
- 2015–2017: Ittihad FC (GK coach)
- 2017: Juventus București (GK coach)
- 2017–2018: CSMȘ Reșița (GK coach)
- 2018: Voluntari (GK coach)
- 2019: Sportul Snagov (GK coach)
- * Club domestic league appearances and goals as of 30 March 2010 (UTC)

Gheorghe Martin Tudor (10 June 1976 – 30 March 2020) was a Romanian footballer who played as a goalkeeper. Tudor was known as one of the best goalkeepers of Steaua București and FCSB in the 2000s.

Martin Tudor signed his first professional contract with Jiul Petroșani in 1996, aged 20. From there he was transferred to Olimpia Satu Mare in 1997 and then to Steaua București two years later.

Tudor played for six years in Bucharest at Steaua București and FCSB, but in 2005 he left Bucharest to join CFR 1907 Cluj. From 2007 to 2008 he played at U Cluj. He retired in June 2008. In January 2010 he returned to professional football and retired again in the same year.

After retirement, he started a new career as a goalkeeping coach, working for Steaua București, FCSB, FC U Craiova, Romania national football team, Ittihad FC or FC Voluntari, among others.

On 30 March 2020, around 10 o'clock in the morning, Martin Tudor suffered a heart attack in the kitchen of his girlfriend's apartment, in Reșița. According to his former teammate Dorinel Munteanu, CSM Reșița manager at that time, "the ambulance arrived very quickly, but unfortunately, nothing could be done, all the resuscitation maneuvers were done, but the tragedy could not be avoided." Martin Tudor was declared deceased in the same day, at just 43 years.

== Honours ==
Olimpia Satu Mare

- Divizia B: 1997–98

Steaua București

- Divizia A: 2000–01, 2004–05
