= Victor Pițurcă =

Romanian footballer and manager

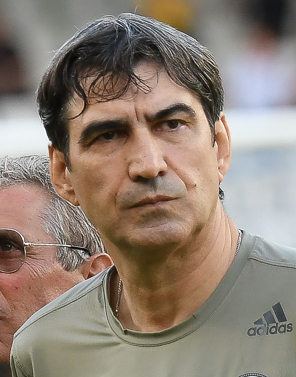
- Pițurcă in 2018

Personal information
- Date of birth: 8 May 1956 (age 70)
- Place of birth: Orodel, Romania
- Height: 1.85 m (6 ft 1 in)
- Position: Forward

Youth career
- 1964–1974: Universitatea Craiova

Senior career*
Years	Team	Apps	(Gls)
1974–1977	Universitatea Craiova	8	(0)
1974–1975	→ Dinamo Slatina (loan)		
1977–1979	Pandurii Târgu Jiu		
1979–1983	Olt Scornicești	118	(28)
1983–1989	Steaua București	175	(137)
1989–1990	Lens	28	(4)
Total		329	(169)

International career
1985–1987	Romania	13	(6)

Managerial career
- 1991–1992: Steaua București (assistant)
- 1992: Steaua București
- 1994–1995: FC Universitatea Craiova
- 1996–1998: Romania U21
- 1998–1999: Romania
- 2000–2002: Steaua București
- 2002–2004: Steaua București
- 2004–2009: Romania
- 2010: Steaua București
- 2010: FC Universitatea Craiova
- 2011–2014: Romania
- 2014–2015: Al-Ittihad
- 2015–2016: Al-Ittihad
- 2019–2020: Universitatea Craiova
- * Club domestic league appearances and goals

Victor Pițurcă (Romanian pronunciation: [ˈviktor piˈt͡surkə]; born 8 May 1956) is a Romanian professional football manager and former player.

== Club career ==
Pițurcă was born on 8 May 1956 in Orodel, Dolj County, Romania and began playing junior-level football at Universitatea Craiova. He started his senior career in 1974, when he was loaned for one year to Dinamo Slatina in Divizia B. When he returned to "U" Craiova, coach Constantin Cernăianu gave him his Divizia A debut on 19 November 1975 in a 4–0 home win over Argeș Pitești. However, during his two seasons spent at Craiova, he played rarely, so he went again in Divizia B, this time at Pandurii Târgu Jiu. There, in his first season he worked with coach Constantin Oțet and netted over half of the total 37 goals scored by the team, but the club was relegated to Divizia C. In the 1978–79 season, Pițurcă scored 46 goals of Pandurii's total of 98, helping them gain promotion back to Divizia B after one year. In 1979, he went back to Divizia A football, as he joined Olt Scornicești, making regular appearances during his four-years spell.

In July 1983, Steaua București, coached by Cernăianu, wanted him, but his Scornicești coach, Florin Halagian, tried to retain him until Emerich Jenei's insistence secured the transfer. In his first season, he did not win any trophies, but afterwards he helped the team conquer five league titles in a row. First was The Double in the 1984–85 season when Pițurcă was the second top-scorer of the league, having only one goal behind Sportul Studențesc's Gheorghe Hagi, as he scored 19 goals in the 32 matches coaches Halagian and Jenei used him. He also scored the decisive goal of the 2–1 victory in the Cupa României final over his former team, Universitatea Craiova. In the following season, he was again the league's second top-scorer, this time with two goals behind Hagi, having scored 29 in the 34 appearances given to him by Jenei. The coach also used him in all nine games in the historical European Cup campaign in which Pițurcă was the team's top-scorer, netting five times in all the home matches, one against each of Vejle, Budapest Honvéd and Kuusysi Lahti and a brace in the 3–0 win in the semifinals against Anderlecht. He then played as a starter until the 112th minute of extra time when he was replaced with Marin Radu in the eventual 2–0 victory after the penalty shoot-out in the final against Barcelona. Pițurcă started the 1986–87 season by playing all the minutes in the 1–0 win over Dynamo Kyiv in the European Super Cup and in the loss in the Intercontinental Cup with the same score against River Plate. He finished the season by winning another Double with Steaua, as coaches Jenei and Anghel Iordănescu gave him 31 league appearances in which he scored 22 goals, being surpassed only by Dinamo București's controversial European Golden Shoe winner, Rodion Cămătaru, who netted double. He also appeared the full 90 minutes in the 1–0 victory in the Cupa României final over Dinamo. In the next season, Pițurcă was used by Iordănescu in 33 league games in which he scored 34 goals, being the top-scorer of the championship and European Bronze Boot as only Tanju Çolak (39) and John Eriksen (36) scored more. He made another continental performance with the team as they reached the semi-finals of the European Cup where they lost to Benfica, Pițurcă contributing with one goal scored against Rangers in the eight matches played. In his last season spent with The Military Men, the team won another Double, Iordănescu using him in 22 league matches, managing to score 23 goals. He also played the whole game in another 1–0 victory in the Cupa României final over rivals Dinamo. Pițurcă delivered another European performance with the club, playing seven games in the European Cup campaign. He scored one goal in the semi-finals against Galatasaray, a controversial incident where goalkeeper Zoran Simović kicked the ball into the back of his head, leading to it entering the goalpost, but the referee wrongfully disallowed it. He then played the entire match in the 4–0 loss to AC Milan in the final. During these years, Pițurcă netted five goals in the derby against Dinamo which helped the club earn three victories, two in the league and one in the Cupa României respectively. His last Divizia A game took place on 17 June 1989 in Steaua's 4–1 home win over Flacăra Moreni, with him scoring a goal, totaling 301 appearances with 65 goals in the competition and 29 matches with six goals in European competitions.

After he won the European Cup in 1986, Pițurcă had an offer to play for Anderlecht, but was not allowed to go there by the communist regime. However, in 1989 with the help of Valentin Ceaușescu, he and teammate Tudorel Stoica were allowed to transfer at Lens in French Division 2, where after one season, Pițurcă ended his playing career.

On 25 March 2008, he was decorated by the president of Romania, Traian Băsescu for the winning of the 1985–86 European Cup with Ordinul "Meritul Sportiv" — (The Order "The Sportive Merit") class II.

== International career ==
Pițurcă played 13 games and scored six goals for Romania, making his debut on 27 March 1985 under coach Mircea Lucescu in a 0–0 friendly draw against Poland. After playing two matches in the 1986 World Cup qualifiers, he scored his first two goals for the national team in a 3–1 friendly win over Norway. He netted another brace in a 4–2 friendly victory against Israel. Subsequently, he made five appearances during the Euro 1988 qualifiers where he scored two goals in two victories over Albania and Spain. He made his last appearance for Romania on 18 November 1987 in a 0–0 draw against Austria.

== Managerial career ==
Pițurcă's first coaching experience was working as an assistant of Emerich Jenei at Steaua București. Shortly afterwards, he became the team's head coach in March 1992, winning on his debut with 3–0 against rivals Rapid București. He finished the season in second place and won the Cupa României after the penalty shoot-out victory in the final against Politehnica Timișoara. His following coaching spell began in 1994 at Universitatea Craiova where he finished second in the 1994–95 season.

In 1996, Pițurcă was named coach of Romania's under-21 side, leading the team to its first qualification to a European Championship in 1998, which Romania subsequently hosted. They qualified after winning the group 8 of the qualifiers with eight victories out of eight matches against Iceland, Republic of Ireland, Lithuania and Macedonia. In the final tournament which was composed of eight teams, they were eliminated by Netherlands with 2–0 in the quarter-finals. They also lost the games for the 5th-8th places and for the 7th place to Germany and Russia respectively. However, from the 20-players squad that took part at that tournament, only five never played for Romania's senior team throughout their career.

In 1998, following the success with the under-21 side, Pițurcă was appointed as Romania's seniors manager, making his debut on 17 August in a 0–0 friendly draw against Norway. He qualified the team to the Euro 2000, as he won the qualification group with seven victories and three draws against Portugal, Slovakia, Hungary, Azerbaijan and Liechtenstein. However, despite this performance, Pițurcă was sacked in late 1999, not having the chance to take the squad to the final tournament, due to an argument he had with Romania's best players, Gheorghe Hagi, Gheorghe Popescu and Dan Petrescu.

At the beginning of the year 2000, he returned to Steaua, finishing the championship in third place. He managed to win the following one and also the 2001 Supercupa României with a 2–1 victory against Dinamo București. He resigned in June 2002 after an argument with the club's chairman, Gigi Becali, but they reconciled and Pițurcă came back in October the same year. He finished the 2002–03 and 2003–04 seasons in second place. He guided the team in the 2003–04 UEFA Cup season when The Red and Blues eliminated Neman Grodno and Southampton in the first two rounds. Subsequently, they earned a 1–1 draw in the first leg of the following round against Liverpool, losing the away leg with 1–0, thus the campaign ended. In July 2004, Pițurcă resigned after another argument with Becali, who fired player Romeo Pădureț without his approval.

In December 2004, Pițurcă was appointed manager of Romania for the second time, when the qualification to the 2006 World Cup was largely compromised. Despite obtaining good results in the qualifiers, including a 2–0 home win over Czech Republic, he was ultimately unable to secure qualification. He won the Euro 2008 qualifying group G ahead of Netherlands, against whom he obtained a historical first-ever victory with 1–0 at the Farul stadium. This performance helped him earn the 2007 Gazeta Sporturilor Romania Coach of the Year award. In the Euro 2008 final tournament, Romania was drawn in the "Group of Death" where they obtained two draws in their first two games against France and Italy who were the finalists of the previous World Cup. However, they lost 0–2 to the Netherlands, finishing the group in third place, thus being eliminated from the competition. He was very criticized by the press for the defensive style imposed on the team, especially in the last match. After Euro 2008, Romania showed an increasingly poor form during the 2010 World Cup qualifying campaign, as in the first two games they lost 0–3 to Lithuania at home and four days later secured a difficult 1–0 victory against the Faroe Islands. After a 2–2 draw against France, they lost the next two games to Serbia and Austria. Considering these results, the Romanian Football Federation released Pițurcă in April 2009, appointing Răzvan Lucescu instead.

In 2010, he had two short spells as manager at Steaua and Universitatea Craiova, leaving both clubs due to conflicts with their owners.

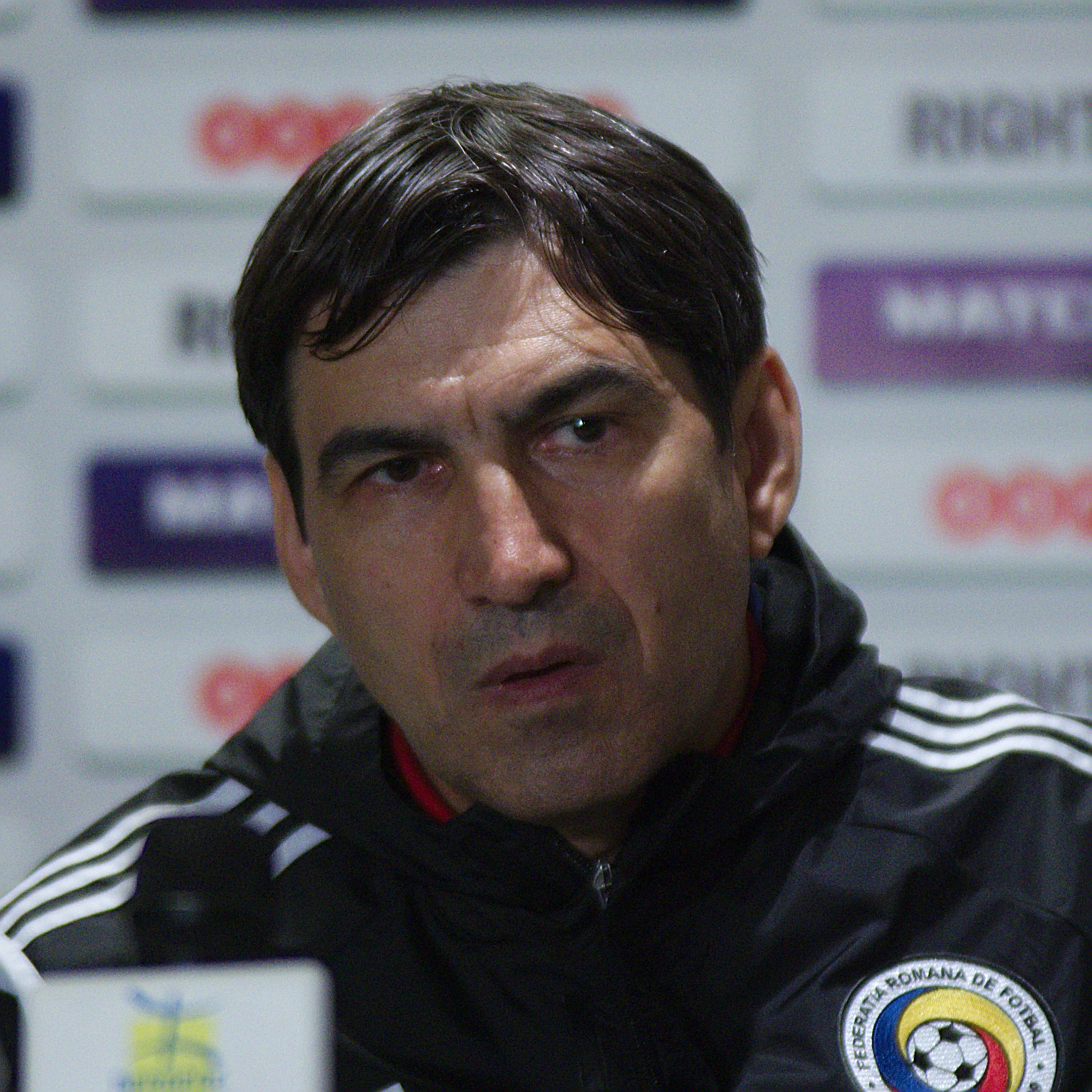
Victor Pițurcă as manager of Romania in 2014

On 14 June 2011, Pițurcă returned for a third spell in charge of Romania when the chances of qualifying for Euro 2012 were very low, with the objective of creating a team that would qualify for Euro 2016. He was close to qualifying for the 2014 World Cup, finishing the qualification group in second place behind Netherlands but above Turkey, Hungary, Estonia and Andorra. Thus they reached the play-off where they lost 4–2 on aggregate to Greece. He started with two victories against Greece and Finland, and a draw against Hungary in the Euro 2016 qualifiers. Subsequently, he left the team to go to Saudi Arabia, but Romania still managed to qualify for the final tournament by utilizing many of the young players Pițurcă had promoted. He has a total of 96 games from his three spells at the national team, consisting of 53 victories, 23 draws and 20 losses.

On 16 October 2014, Pițurcă signed a two-year deal with Al-Ittihad in Saudi Arabia. In January 2015, he was heavily criticized for excluding Al-Ittihad's top stars Mohammed Noor and Hamad Al-Montashari due to disobeying training procedure. He was dismissed in June 2015 because the club's officials were unsatisfied that the team finished the season in fourth place. He was replaced by László Bölöni, but came back to the club in December the same year only to leave again in July 2016.

Pițurcă signed a contract with Universitatea Craiova on 22 August 2019, but resigned in January 2020 because he was unsatisfied that the club's officials did not want to transfer the players he desired. He has a total of 204 matches as a manager in the Romanian top-division, Liga I, consisting of 116 victories, 43 draws and 45 losses.

== Controversies ==
In 1981, Pițurcă and other people were arrested in Târgu Jiu for playing barbut, an illegal dice game during the communist regime. He was sentenced to six months in prison, but eventually was released after about two months as his club Olt Scornicești insisted that there be a re-trial.

In May 2008, Gigi Becali, the owner of Steaua, had promised €1.7 million to the footballers of Universitatea Cluj so that they would not succumb to CFR Cluj. He sent one of his men with the money in Cluj-Napoca, where he ended up detained by the National Anticorruption Directorate. A few days later, Becali claimed the money was to buy a plot of land and presented a sales-purchase contract that he claimed was signed on 15 April, one of the signatures belonging to Pițurcă. In 2013, Pițurcă received a one-year suspended sentence in the case, being found guilty of perjury in favor of Becali.

== Personal life ==
At Steaua București and Universitatea Craiova he coached his son, Alexandru, who was a striker. Pițurcă is the cousin of Eugen Neagoe who was also a footballer and a coach. Another one of his cousins, Florin Pițurcă, was a footballer who played for Drobeta-Turnu Severin in Divizia C, dying in December 1978 at age 20, shortly after playing a game.

Pițurcă was nicknamed Satana ("Satan") by the press, something he called "remarkable".

== Playing statistics ==
Appearances and goals by national team and year
National team	Year	Apps	Goals
Romania	1985	3	0
Romania	1986	4	4
Romania	1987	6	2
Total		13	6

Scores and results list Romania's goal tally first. "Score" column indicates the score after each Victor Pițurcă goal.

#	Date	Venue	Opponent	Score	Result	Competition
1	4 June 1986	Stadionul 23 August, Bucharest, Romania	Norway	1–0	3–1	Friendly
2	4 June 1986	Stadionul 23 August, Bucharest, Romania	Norway	2–0	3–1	Friendly
3	8 October 1986	Ramat Gan Stadium, Israel	Israel	1–0	4–2	Friendly
4	8 October 1986	Ramat Gan Stadium, Israel	Israel	4–1	4–2	Friendly
5	25 March 1987	Stadionul Steaua, Bucharest, Romania	Albania	1–0	5–1	Euro 1988 qualifiers
6	29 April 1987	Stadionul Steaua, Bucharest, Romania	Spain	1–0	3–1	Euro 1988 qualifiers

== Managerial statistics ==
As of 22 December 2019

Team	From	To	Record				
Team	From	To	G	W	D	L	Win %
Steaua București	8 March 1992	21 June 1992	23	14	5	4	60.87
FC Universitatea Craiova	29 August 1994	30 June 1995	37	23	4	10	62.16
Romania U21	1 June 1996	31 May 1998	10	8	0	2	80.00
Romania	1 June 1998	1 December 1999	21	11	8	2	52.38
Steaua București	7 July 2000	7 June 2002	75	39	17	19	52.00
Steaua București	27 October 2002	3 June 2004	61	32	21	8	52.46
Romania	10 December 2004	9 April 2009	46	27	7	12	58.70
Steaua București	20 June 2010	6 August 2010	3	2	1	0	66.67
FC Universitatea Craiova	26 August 2010	14 January 2011	16	7	3	6	43.75
Romania	14 June 2011	16 October 2014	35	17	10	8	48.57
Al-Ittihad	17 October 2014	12 July 2015	23	12	4	7	52.17
Al-Ittihad	15 December 2015	10 July 2016	26	14	5	7	53.85
Universitatea Craiova	1 September 2019	4 January 2020	16	8	3	5	50.00
Total			392	214	88	90	54.59

== Honours ==
=== Player ===
Pandurii Târgu Jiu

- Divizia C: 1978–79

Steaua București

- Divizia A: 1984–85, 1985–86, 1986–87, 1987–88, 1988–89
- Cupa României: 1984–85, 1986–87, 1987–88, 1988–89
- European Cup: 1985–86, runner-up 1988–89
- European Supercup: 1986
- Intercontinental Cup runner-up: 1986

Individual

- Divizia A top scorer: 1987–88
- European Bronze Boot: 1987–88

=== Manager ===
Steaua București

- Divizia A: 2000–01
- Cupa României: 1991–92
- Supercupa României: 2001

Individual

- Gazeta Sporturilor Romania Coach of the Year: 2007
