= 2004–05 FC Steaua București season =

Steaua București
2004–05 season
- Owner: George Becali
- President: Mihai Stoica
- Head coach: Walter Zenga; Dumitru Dumitriu
- Stadium: Stadionul Steaua
- Divizia A: 1st (champions)
- Cupa României: First round
- UEFA Cup: Round of 16
- Top goalscorer: League: Nicolae Dică (11); All: Nicolae Dică (13)

The 2004–05 season was the 57th season in the existence of FC Steaua București and the club's 57th consecutive season in the top flight of Romanian football. In addition to the domestic league, Steaua București participated in this season's editions of the Cupa României and the UEFA Cup.

== First-team squad ==
Squad at end of season

Note: Flags indicate national team as defined under FIFA eligibility rules; some limited exceptions apply. Players may hold more than one non-FIFA nationality.

No.	Pos.	Nation	Player
12	GK	ROU	Martin Tudor
23	GK	ROU	Florin Dobre
33	GK	BLR	Vasil Khamutowski
2	DF	ROU	Florentin Dumitru
3	DF	ROU	Dorin Goian
4	DF	ROU	Tiberiu Curt
6	DF	ROU	Mirel Rădoi (captain)
15	DF	ROU	Mihai Neșu
17	DF	ROU	Eugen Baciu
18	DF	ROU	Petre Marin
20	DF	ROU	George Ogăraru
24	DF	ROU	Sorin Ghionea
8	MF	ROU	Dorinel Munteanu

No.	Pos.	Nation	Player
11	MF	ROU	Gabriel Boștină
14	MF	ROU	Nicolae Dică
16	MF	ROU	Bănel Nicoliță
22	MF	ROU	Sorin Paraschiv
28	MF	ROU	Florin Lovin
29	MF	ROU	Cristian Ciocoiu
—	MF	BIH	Boris Keca
9	FW	ROU	Laurențiu Diniță
19	FW	ROU	Daniel Oprița
21	FW	ROU	Andrei Cristea
—	FW	ROU	Alin Lițu
—	FW	ROU	Valentin Simion

== Competitions ==
=== Overall record ===
Competition	First match	Last match	Starting round	Final position	Record							
Competition	First match	Last match	Starting round	Final position	Pld	W	D	L	GF	GA	GD	Win %
Divizia A	1 August 2004	11 June 2005	Matchday 1	Winners	30	19	6	5	47	18	+29	63.33
Cupa României	13 October 2004		Round of 32	Round of 32	1	0	0	1	0	1	−1	0.00
UEFA Cup	12 August 2004	20 March 2005	Second qualifying round	Round of 16	12	5	2	5	17	15	+2	41.67
Total					43	24	8	11	64	34	+30	55.81

Source: Competitions

=== Divizia A ===
==== League table ====
Pos	Team	Pld	W	D	L	GF	GA	GD	Pts	Qualification or relegation
1	Steaua București (C)	30	19	6	5	47	18	+29	63	Qualification to Champions League second qualifying round
2	Dinamo București	30	20	2	8	60	30	+30	62	Qualification to UEFA Cup first round
3	Rapid București	30	16	9	5	51	27	+24	57 (Note: RAP 3–0 PRO; PRO 3–3 RAP)	Qualification to UEFA Cup first qualifying round
4	Național București	30	17	6	7	50	33	+17	57	
5	Farul Constanța	30	15	7	8	42	28	+14	52	

Source: LT (in Romanian)
Rules for classification: 1) points; 2) head-to-head points; 3) head-to-head goal difference; 4) head-to-head goals scored; 5) goal difference; 6) number of goals scored.
(C) Champions

==== Results summary ====
Overall								Home						Away					
Pld	W	D	L	GF	GA	GD	Pts	W	D	L	GF	GA	GD	W	D	L	GF	GA	GD
30	19	6	5	47	18	+29	63	13	1	1	31	6	+25	6	5	4	16	12	+4

Source: LT

==== Results by round ====
Round	1	2	3	4	5	6	7	8	9	10	11	12	13	14	15	16	17	18	19	20	21	22	23	24	25	26	27	28	29	30
Ground	H	A	H	A	H	A	H	A	H	H	A	H	A	H	A	A	H	A	H	A	H	A	H	A	A	H	A	H	A	H
Result	W	L	W	W	W	D	W	W	L	W	W	W	D	W	D	W	D	D	W	W	W	L	W	D	L	W	L	W	W	W
Position	1	7	5	5	3	2	2	2	2	1	1	1	1	1	1	1	1	1	1	1	1	1	1	1	1	1	1	1	1	1

Source: Matches
A = Away; H = Home; W = Win; D = Draw; L = Loss

==== Matches ====
1 August 2004 1	Steaua București	2–0	Gloria Bistrița	Bucharest
20:15 EEST (UTC+3)	Răchită 38'; Neaga 40'	Report		Stadium: Steaua; Attendance: 15,000; Referee: Viorel Anghelinei

8 August 2004 2	Rapid București	2–1	Steaua București	Bucharest
20:15 EEST (UTC+3)	Ilie 17' (pen.), 25'; Constantin (yellow card) 44' (yellow-red card) 46'	Report	Dică 34'	Stadium: Giulești-Valentin Stănescu; Attendance: 15,000; Referee: Ionică Serea

22 August 2004 4	Dinamo București	0–1	Steaua București	Bucharest
20:15 EEST (UTC+3)		Report	An. Cristea 84'	Stadium: Dinamo; Attendance: 14,000; Referee: Alexandru Tudor

29 August 2004 5	Steaua București	5–0	Universitatea Craiova	Bucharest
19:00 EEST (UTC+3)	Dică 13', 18' (pen.), 61'; An. Cristea 14'; Boștină 72'	Report	Murgan (red card) 17'	Stadium: Steaua; Attendance: 15,000; Referee: Ionică Serea

12 September 2004 6	Argeș Pitești	2–2	Steaua București	Piteşti
17:00 EEST (UTC+3)	Năstăsie 13'; Bilașco 60'	Report	Oprița 52', 54'	Stadium: Nicolae Dobrin; Attendance: 17,000; Referee: Augustus Constantin

19 September 2004 7	Steaua București	3–1	Farul Constanța	Bucharest
20:15 EEST (UTC+3)	Lovin 56'; An. Cristea 59'; Ogăraru 62'	Report	Guriță 90'	Stadium: Steaua; Attendance: 12,000; Referee: Marian Salomir

25 September 2004 8	Sportul Studențesc	1–2	Steaua București	Bucharest
17:00 EEST (UTC+3)	Bălan 42'	Report	Paraschiv 58'; Baciu 78'	Stadium: Regie; Attendance: 15,000; Referee: Alexandru Tudor

3 October 2004 9	Steaua București	0–1	Politehnica Iași	Bucharest
20:15 EEST (UTC+3)		Report	Ad. Cristea 65'	Stadium: Steaua; Attendance: 25,000; Referee: Tiberiu Lajos

17 October 2004 10	Steaua București	1–0	Oțelul Galați	Bucharest
20:15 EEST (UTC+3)	Neaga 70'	Report		Stadium: Steaua; Attendance: 10,000; Referee: Sebastian Colțescu

24 October 2004 11	CFR Cluj	0–2	Steaua București	Cluj-Napoca
15:00 EEST (UTC+3)	Goia (yellow card) 41' (yellow-red card) 58'	Report	Oprița 1'; Paraschiv (red card) 53'; Ogăraru 80'	Stadium: Dr. Constantin Rădulescu; Attendance: 12,000; Referee: Cristian Balaj

31 October 2004 12	Steaua București	5–1	Național București	Bucharest
20:15 EET (UTC+2)	Neaga 34' (pen.), 64'; Oprița 35'; An. Cristea 76', 77'	Report	Coman (yellow card) 17' (yellow-red card) 32'; Caramarin 79'	Stadium: Steaua; Attendance: 20,000; Referee: Alexandru Tudor

7 November 2004 13	FCM Bacău	2–2	Steaua București	Bacău
20:15 EET (UTC+2)	Goian 31'; Cursaru 84'	Report	Neaga 78'; Oprița 90+3'	Stadium: Municipal; Attendance: 7,000; Referee: Robert Dumitru

20 November 2004 14	Steaua București	3–2	FC Brașov	Bucharest
20:15 EET (UTC+2)	Diniță 22'; Dică 73'; Boștină 77'	Report	Sărmășan 65'; Buga 89'	Stadium: Național; Attendance: 1,000; Referee: Ionică Serea

28 November 2004 15	Politehnica Timișoara	1–1	Steaua București	Timișoara
17:00 EET (UTC+2)	Gueye 57'	Report	Boștină 35'	Stadium: Dan Păltinișanu; Attendance: 20,000; Referee: Cristian Balaj

4 December 2004 3	Steaua București	3–0	Apulum Alba Iulia	Bucharest
14:00 EET (UTC+2)	An. Cristea 49'; Neaga 50'; Diniță 89'	Report		Stadium: Steaua; Attendance: 25,000; Referee: Robert Dumitru

3 April 2005 18	Apulum Alba Iulia	1–1	Steaua București	Alba Iulia
14:00 EEST (UTC+3)	Giuchici 7' (yellow card) 88' (yellow-red card) 90+2'	Report	Boștină 1' (pen.)	Stadium: Cetate; Attendance: 14,000; Referee: Augustus Constantin

6 April 2005 16	Gloria Bistrița	0–2	Steaua București	Bistrița
16:15 EEST (UTC+3)		Report	Boștină 7'; Lovin (yellow card) 27' (yellow-red card) 51'; Neșu 45'	Stadium: Gloria; Attendance: 10,000; Referee: Cristian Balaj

10 April 2005 19	Steaua București	1–0	Dinamo București	Bucharest
20:15 EEST (UTC+3)	Dică 10'	Report		Stadium: Steaua; Attendance: 25,000; Referee: Massimo Busacca (Switzerland)

14 April 2005 17	Steaua București	0–0	Rapid București	Bucharest
20:15 EEST (UTC+3)		Report		Stadium: Steaua; Attendance: 20,000; Referee: Tom Henning Øvrebø (Norway)

17 April 2005 20	Universitatea Craiova	0–1	Steaua București	Craiova
20:15 EEST (UTC+3)		Report	Dică 35'	Stadium: Ion Oblemenco; Attendance: 30,000; Referee: Marian Salomir

23 April 2005 21	Steaua București	2–0	Argeș Pitești	Bucharest
20:30 EEST (UTC+3)	Dică 50', 70'	Report		Stadium: Steaua; Attendance: 0 Referee: Vasile Bratu

27 April 2005 22	Farul Constanța	1–0	Steaua București	Constanța
17:00 EEST (UTC+3)	Cristocea 58' (pen.)	Report	Tudor (yellow card) 58' (yellow-red card) 65'	Stadium: Gheorghe Hagi; Attendance: 20,000; Referee: Sorin Corpodean

30 April 2005 23	Steaua București	1–0	Sportul Studențesc	Bucharest
17:00 EEST (UTC+3)	Dică 29'	Report		Stadium: Steaua; Attendance: 8,000; Referee: Alexandru Tudor

4 May 2005 24	Politehnica Iași	0–0	Steaua București	Iași
16:30 EEST (UTC+3)		Report		Stadium: Emil Alexandrescu; Attendance: 15,000; Referee: Marian Salomir

8 May 2005 25	Oțelul Galați	1–0	Steaua București	Galați
17:00 EEST (UTC+3)	Bădescu 28'	Report		Stadium: Dunărea; Attendance: 14,000; Referee: Sebastian Colțescu

14 May 2005 26	Steaua București	1–0	CFR Cluj	Bucharest
20:30 EEST (UTC+3)	Rădoi 13' (pen.)	Report		Stadium: Steaua; Attendance: 11,000; Referee: Robert Dumtriu

18 May 2005 27	Național București	1–0	Steaua București	Bucharest
19:30 EEST (UTC+3)	Rada 50'	Report		Stadium: Cotroceni; Attendance: 12,000; Referee: Alexandru Tudor

21 May 2005 28	Steaua București	2–0	FCM Bacău	Bucharest
20:30 EEST (UTC+3)	Nicoliță 17', 36'	Report		Stadium: Steaua; Attendance: 17,000; Referee: Lucian Dan

28 May 2005 29	FC Brașov	0–1	Steaua București	Brașov
18:00 EEST (UTC+3)		Report	Munteanu 45'	Stadium: Tineretului; Attendance: 15,000; Referee: Cristian Balaj

11 June 2005 30	Steaua București	2–1	Politehnica Timișoara	Bucharest
17:00 EEST (UTC+3)	An. Cristea 35'; Dică 49'	Report	Gueye 26'	Stadium: Steaua; Attendance: 25,000; Referee: Sebastian Colțescu

=== Cupa României ===
==== Results ====
13 October 2004 Round of 32	Universitatea Cluj	1–0	Steaua București	Cluj-Napoca
14:00 EEST (UTC+3)	Székely 85'	Report		Stadium: Ion Moina; Attendance: 20,000; Referee: Robert Dumitru

=== UEFA Cup ===
==== Second qualifying round ====
12 August 2004 First leg	Železnik (Serbia and Montenegro)	2–4	(Romania) Steaua București	Belgrade, Serbia and Montenegro
17:00 CEST (UTC+2)	Drinić 66'; Goulart 86'	Report	Oprița 18'; Neaga 24', 49'; Paraschiv 34'	Stadium: Partizan; Attendance: 2,000; Referee: Knud Erik Fisker (Denmark)

26 August 2004 Second leg	Steaua București (Romania)	1–2 (5–4 agg.)	(Serbia and Montenegro) Železnik	Bucharest, Romania
20:00 EEST (UTC+3)	Dică 79'	Report	Drinić 10' (red card) 52'; Goulart 73'	Stadium: Steaua; Attendance: 23,000; Referee: Michael Weiner (Germany)

==== First round ====
16 September 2004 First leg	Steaua București (Romania)	2–1	(Bulgaria) CSKA Sofia	Bucharest, Romania
20:00 EEST (UTC+3)	Neaga 10'; Dică 79'	Report	Yanev 28'	Stadium: Steaua; Attendance: 20,000; Referee: Olegário Benquerença (Portugal)

30 September 2004 Second leg	CSKA Sofia (Bulgaria)	2–2 (3–4 agg.)	(Romania) Steaua București	Sofia, Bulgaria
17:00 EEST (UTC+3)	Sakaliev 45+1'; Gargorov 76'	Report	Oprița 14'; Paraschiv 34'	Stadium: Balgarska Armia; Attendance: 20,000; Referee: Espen Berntsen (Norway)

==== Group stage ====
Group B standings
Pos	Team	Pld	W	D	L	GF	GA	GD	Pts	Qualification
1	(Spain) Athletic Bilbao	4	3	0	1	11	4	+7	9	Advance to knockout stage
2	(Romania) Steaua București	4	2	0	2	4	3	+1	6	Advance to knockout stage
3	(Italy) Parma	4	2	0	2	5	6	−1	6	Advance to knockout stage
4	(Turkey) Beşiktaş	4	1	1	2	7	7	0	4	
5	(Belgium) Standard Liège	4	1	1	2	4	11	−7	4	

Source: RSSSF

==== Results ====
21 October 2004 1	Steaua București (Romania)	2–0	(Belgium) Standard Liège	Bucharest, Romania
20:15 EEST (UTC+3)	Dragutinović 68' (o.g.); Neaga 81'	Report		Stadium: Steaua; Attendance: 23,000; Referee: Tomasz Mikulski (Poland)

4 November 2004 2	Parma (Italy)	1–0	(Romania) Steaua București	Parma, Italy
19:00 CET (UTC+1)	Budel 80'	Report		Stadium: Ennio Tardini; Attendance: 3,949; Referee: Ruud Bossen (Netherlands)

25 November 2004 3	Steaua București (Romania)	2–1	(Turkey) Beşiktaş	Bucharest, Romania
20:15 EET (UTC+2)	Neaga 3'; Ciocoiu 19'; Oprița (yellow card) 77' (yellow-red card) 78'	Report	Akın 88'	Stadium: Steaua; Attendance: 14,000; Referee: Željko Širić (Croatia)

1 December 2004 4	Athletic Bilbao (Spain)	1–0	(Romania) Steaua București	Bilbao, Spain
20:45 CET (UTC+1)	Etxeberria 45'	Report		Stadium: San Mamés; Attendance: 32,000; Referee: Georgios Kasnaferis (Greece)

==== Knockout stage ====
===== Round of 32 =====
16 February 2005 First leg	Valencia (Spain)	2–0	(Romania) Steaua București	Valencia, Spain
21:30 CET (UTC+1)	Di Vaio 39'; Aimar 55'	Report		Stadium: Mestalla; Attendance: 30,000; Referee: Domenico Messina (Italy)

24 February 2005 Second leg	Steaua București (Romania)	2–0 (a.e.t.) (2–2 agg.) (4–3 p)	(Spain) Valencia	Bucharest, Romania
20:00 EET (UTC+2)	Cristea 50', 71'	Report		Stadium: Steaua; Attendance: 22,000; Referee: Johan Verbist (Belgium)
	Penalties
	Rădoi (penalty scored); Munteanu (penalty missed); Lovin (penalty scored); Boștină (penalty scored); Dică (penalty scored)		(penalty scored) Aimar; (penalty scored) Mista; (penalty scored) Rufete; (penalty missed) Baraja; (penalty missed) Di Vaio

===== Round of 16 =====
16 March 2005 First leg	Steaua București (Romania)	0–0	(Spain) Villarreal	Bucharest, Romania
20:00 EET (UTC+2)		Report		Stadium: Steaua; Attendance: 30,000; Referee: Massimo Busacca (Switzerland)

20 March 2005 Second leg	Villarreal (Spain)	2–0 (2–0 agg.)	(Romania) Steaua București	Villarreal, Spain
20:00 CET (UTC+1)	José Mari 6'; Riquelme 62' (pen.)	Report		Stadium: El Madrigal; Attendance: 20,000; Referee: Wolfgang Stark (Germany)
