= 2003–04 FC Steaua București season =

Steaua București
2003–04 season
- Owner: George Becali
- President: Mihai Stoica
- Head coach: Victor Pițurcă
- Stadium: Stadionul Steaua
- Divizia A: 2nd
- Cupa României: Second round
- UEFA Cup: Second round
- Top goalscorer: League: Adrian Neaga (13); All: Adrian Neaga (13)

The 2003–04 season was the 56th season in the existence of FC Steaua București and the club's 56th consecutive season in the top flight of Romanian football. In addition to the domestic league, Steaua București participated in this season's editions of the Cupa României and the UEFA Cup.

== First-team squad ==
Squad at end of season

Note: Flags indicate national team as defined under FIFA eligibility rules; some limited exceptions apply. Players may hold more than one non-FIFA nationality.

No.	Pos.	Nation	Player
12	GK	ROU	Martin Tudor
23	GK	ROU	Eugen Nae
33	GK	BLR	Vasil Khamutowski
2	DF	ROU	Florentin Dumitru
3	DF	ROU	Valeriu Răchită
4	DF	ROU	Tiberiu Curt
6	DF	ROU	Mirel Rădoi (captain)
8	DF	ROU	Pompiliu Stoica
15	DF	ROU	Mihai Neșu
16	DF	ROU	Andrei Stangă
20	DF	ROU	George Ogăraru
26	DF	ROU	Daniel Bălan
29	DF	ROU	Dorel Mutică

No.	Pos.	Nation	Player
—	DF	ROU	Romeo Pădureț
5	MF	ROU	Sorin Paraschiv
7	MF	ROU	Adrian Pitu
8	MF	ROU	Dorinel Munteanu
10	MF	ROU	Marian Aliuţă
11	MF	ROU	Gabriel Boștină
14	MF	ROU	Nicolae Dică
18	MF	CMR	Nana Falemi
9	FW	ROU	Adrian Neaga
19	FW	ROU	Daniel Oprița
27	FW	ROU	Laurențiu Diniță
—	FW	ROU	Alexandru Pițurcă

== Competitions ==
=== Overall record ===
Competition	First match	Last match	Starting round	Final position	Record							
Competition	First match	Last match	Starting round	Final position	Pld	W	D	L	GF	GA	GD	Win %
Divizia A	10 August 2003	3 June 2004	Matchday 1	2nd	30	18	10	2	60	19	+41	60.00
Cupa României	1 October 2003	22 October 2003	First round	Second round	2	1	0	1	5	2	+3	50.00
UEFA Cup	14 August 2003	27 November 2003	Qualifying round	Second round	6	1	4	1	4	4	+0	16.67
Total					38	20	14	4	69	25	+44	52.63

Source: Competitions

=== Divizia A ===
==== League table ====
Pos	Team	Pld	W	D	L	GF	GA	GD	Pts	Qualification or relegation
1	Dinamo București (C)	30	22	4	4	71	30	+41	70	Qualification to Champions League second qualifying round
2	Steaua București	30	18	10	2	60	20	+40	64	Qualification to UEFA Cup second qualifying round
3	Rapid București	30	16	7	7	51	32	+19	55	
4	Universitatea Craiova	30	11	11	8	38	34	+4	44	
5	Oțelul Galați	30	10	13	7	30	26	+4	43	Qualification to UEFA Cup first qualifying round

Source: LT (in Romanian)
Rules for classification: 1) points; 2) head-to-head points; 3) head-to-head goal difference; 4) head-to-head goals scored; 5) goal difference; 6) number of goals scored.
(C) Champions

==== Results summary ====
Overall								Home						Away					
Pld	W	D	L	GF	GA	GD	Pts	W	D	L	GF	GA	GD	W	D	L	GF	GA	GD
30	18	10	2	60	20	+40	64	13	2	0	37	9	+28	5	8	2	23	11	+12

Source: LT

==== Results by round ====
Round	1	2	3	4	5	6	7	8	9	10	11	12	13	14	15	16	17	18	19	20	21	22	23	24	25	26	27	28	29	30
Ground	H	A	H	A	H	A	H	A	H	H	A	H	A	H	A	A	H	A	H	A	H	A	H	A	A	H	A	H	A	H
Result	W	D	W	D	W	D	W	D	W	W	W	W	D	W	L	W	D	L	W	W	W	D	W	W	W	W	D	W	D	D
Position	1	1	2	1	1	1	1	1	1	1	1	1	1	1	2	2	2	2	2	2	1	2	2	2	2	2	2	2	2	2

Source: Matches
A = Away; H = Home; W = Win; D = Draw; L = Loss

==== Matches ====
10 August 2003 1	Steaua București	4–0	Brașov	Bucharest
21:30 EEST (UTC+3)	Diniță 18'; Rădoi 20'; Boștină 59' (pen.); Stoica 86'	Report	Sărmășan (red card) 58'	Stadium: Steaua; Attendance: 15,000; Referee: Sorin Corpodean

17 August 2003 2	Rapid București	1–1	Steaua București	Bucharest
21:15 EEST (UTC+3)	Bădoi 62'	Report	Pitu 72'	Stadium: Național; Attendance: 20,000; Referee: Cristian Balaj

23 August 2003 3	Steaua București	1–0	Dinamo București	Bucharest
19:00 EEST (UTC+3)	Răducanu 50'; Curt (yellow card) 68' (yellow-red card) 89'	Report		Stadium: Steaua; Attendance: 22,000; Referee: Marian Salomir

31 August 2003 4	Petrolul Ploiești	1–1	Steaua București	Ploiești
19:45 EEST (UTC+3)	Todoran 27'	Report	Pitu 88'	Stadium: Ilie Oană; Attendance: 8,000; Referee: Ionică Serea

14 September 2003 5	Steaua București	2–0	Politehnica AEK Timișoara	Bucharest
19:45 EEST (UTC+3)	Falemi 20'; Oprița 26'	Report		Stadium: Steaua; Attendance: 4,000; Referee: Iosif Biro

19 September 2003 6	Apulum Alba Iulia	0–0	Steaua București	Alba Iulia
17:00 EEST (UTC+3)		Report	Rădoi (yellow card) 18' (yellow-red card) 70'	Stadium: Cetate; Attendance: 22,000; Referee: Cristian Balaj

28 September 2003 7	Steaua București	2–0	Ceahlăul Piatra Neamț	Bucharest
17:00 EEST (UTC+3)	Boștină 62'; Diniță 69'	Report	Nohai (red card) 68'	Stadium: Steaua; Attendance: 10,000; Referee: Augustus Constantin

5 October 2003 8	Argeș Pitești	0–0	Steaua București	Piteşti
16:30 EEST (UTC+3)	Crivac (red card) 50'	Report		Stadium: Nicolae Dobrin; Attendance: 12,000; Referee: Sorin Corpodean

25 October 2003 10	Steaua București	4–1	Gloria Bistrița	Bucharest
20:00 EEST (UTC+3)	Mutică 6'; Boștină 51'; Răducanu 57'; Curt 78'	Report	Kruja 39'	Stadium: Steaua; Attendance: 7,000; Referee: Viorel Anghelinei

1 November 2003 11	National Bucureşti	0–1	Steaua București	Bucharest
20:00 EET (UTC+2)		Report	Neaga 90+4' (pen.)	Stadium: Cotroceni; Attendance: 8,000; Referee: Alexandru Tudor

9 November 2003 12	Steaua București	2–0	Oţelul Galaţi	Bucharest
17:00 EET (UTC+2)	Răducanu 9'; Răchită 90+3'	Report		Stadium: Steaua; Attendance: 9,000; Referee: Sorin Corpodean

21 November 2003 13	FCM Bacău	0–0	Steaua București	Bacău
20:00 EET (UTC+2)	Petcu (red card) ME'	Report	Rădoi (red card) ME'	Stadium: Dumitru Sechelariu; Attendance: 19,000; Referee: Viorel Anghelinei

30 November 2003 14	Steaua București	2–0	Universitatea Craiova	Bucharest
20:00 EET (UTC+2)	Pitu 63'; Răducanu 79'	Report	Daouda (yellow card) 12' (yellow-red card) 45'; Badea (red card) 76'	Stadium: Steaua; Attendance: 4,000; Referee: Ionică Serea

3 December 2003 9	Steaua București	2–1	FC Oradea	Bucharest
17:00 EET (UTC+2)	Răducanu 36', 43'	Report	Sfârlea 78'	Stadium: Steaua; Attendance: 9,000; Referee: Tiberiu Lajos

7 December 2003 15	Farul Constanta	2–1	Steaua București	Constanța
20:00 EET (UTC+2)	Mihai (yellow card) 35' (yellow-red card) 64'; Cristocea 45'; Bădescu 70'	Report	Niculescu 79'	Stadium: Gheorghe Hagi; Attendance: Cristian Balaj; Referee: 8,000

15 March 2004 16	Brașov	0–1	Steaua București	Brașov
15:00 EET (UTC+2)		Report	Dică 29'	Stadium: Tineretului; Attendance: 12,000; Referee: Augustus Constantin

21 March 2004 17	Steaua București	3–3	Rapid Bucureşti	Bucharest
20:00 EET (UTC+2)	Dumitru 5'; Diniță 35'; D. Munteanu 38'	Report	Galamaz 14'; Ziyati 45'; Niculae 67'	Stadium: Steaua; Attendance: 25,000; Referee: Alexandru Tudor

27 March 2004 18	Dinamo Bucureşti	2–1	Steaua București	Bucharest
21:00 EET (UTC+2)	Bărcăuan 21'; Grigorie 90+3'	Report	Neaga 88'	Stadium: Dinamo; Attendance: 20,000; Referee: Sorin Corpodean

4 April 2004 19	Steaua București	2–1	Petrolul Ploieşti	Bucharest
21:00 EEST (UTC+3)	Neaga 13'; Curt (yellow card) 22' (yellow-red card) 65'; Paraschiv 30'	Report	Petroiesc 36'	Stadium: Steaua; Attendance: 16,000; Referee: Anton Heleșteanu

9 April 2004 20	Politehnica AEK Timisoara	1–8	Steaua București	Timișoara
20:15 EEST (UTC+3)	Bătrânu (red card) 12'; Buia 78' (pen.)	Report	Neaga 13' (pen.), 58', 72'; Dică 30', 36'; Diniță 32'; Paraschiv 45', 72'	Stadium: Dan Păltinișanu; Attendance: 39,000; Referee: Augustus Constantin

14 April 2004 21	Steaua București	4–1	Apulum Alba Iulia	Bucharest
20:00 EEST (UTC+3)	Răchită 25'; Neaga 48'; Diniță 55'; Dică 77'	Report	Paleacu 12' (pen.)	Stadium: Steaua; Attendance: 10,000; Referee: Robert Dumitru

18 April 2004 22	Ceahlăul Piatra Neamț	1–1	Steaua București	Piatra Neamț
17:00 EEST (UTC+3)	Goian 79'	Report	Neaga 40'	Stadium: Ceahlăul; Attendance: 12,000; Referee: Marian Salomir

24 April 2004 23	Steaua București	4–0	Argeș Pitești	Bucharest
21:00 EEST (UTC+3)	Rădoi 43'; Răchită 49'; Dică 67'; Neaga 73'	Report		Stadium: Steaua; Attendance: 14,000; Referee: Viorel Anghelinei

2 May 2004 24	FC Oradea	0–3	Steaua București	Oradea
17:00 EEST (UTC+3)		Report	C. Munteanu 20' (o.g.); Dumitra 24' (o.g.); Dică 26'	Stadium: Municipal; Attendance: 11,000; Referee: Ionică Serea

9 May 2004 25	Gloria Bistrița	0–2	Steaua București	Bistrița
17:00 EEST (UTC+3)		Report	Paraschiv 31'; Neaga 44'	Stadium: Gloria; Attendance: 15,000; Referee: Sorin Corpodean

12 May 2004 26	Steaua București	2–0	National Bucureşti	Bucharest
20:15 EEST (UTC+3)	Neaga 56', 85'	Report		Stadium: Steaua; Attendance: 21,000; Referee: Gheorghe Farcaș

16 May 2004 27	Oţelul Galaţi	2–2	Steaua București	Galați
17:00 EEST (UTC+3)	Aldea 62'; Oprea 65'	Report	Dică 36' (pen.); Neaga 87'	Stadium: Oțelul; Attendance: 12,000; Referee: Ionică Serea

22 May 2004 28	Steaua București	1–0	FCM Bacău	Bucharest
20:30 EEST (UTC+3)	Aliuță 9'	Report		Stadium: Steaua; Attendance: 13,000; Referee: Augustus Constantin

30 May 2004 29	Universitatea Craiova	1–1	Steaua București	Craiova
17:00 EEST (UTC+3)	Njock (red card) 60'; Luțu 73'	Report	Dică 35'; Dumitru (red card) 60'	Stadium: Ion Oblemenco; Attendance: 20,000; Referee: Robert Dumitru

3 June 2004 30	Steaua București	2–2	Farul Constanta	Bucharest
17:00 EEST (UTC+3)	Dică 39'; Oprița 40'; Rădoi (yellow card) 53' (yellow-red card) 74'	Report	Bălțoi 48'; Mihai 90' (pen.)	Stadium: Steaua; Attendance: 7,000; Referee: Viorel Anghelinei

=== Cupa României ===
==== Results ====
1 October 2003 Round of 32	Chimia Craiova	0–4	Steaua București	Craiova
15:00 EEST (UTC+3)		Report	Diniță 34'; Rădoi 54'; Oprița 73'; Boștină 89'	Stadium: Chimia; Attendance: 3,000; Referee: Lucian Dan

22 October 2003 Round of 16	Petrolul Ploiești	2–1 (a.e.t.)	Steaua București	Pitești
16:30 EEST (UTC+3)	Mihalache 85' (pen.); Dobre 101'	Report	Răducanu 6'	Stadium: Nicolae Dobrin; Attendance: 2,500; Referee: Sorin Corpodean

=== UEFA Cup ===
==== Qualifying round ====
14 August 2003 First leg	Neman Grodno (Belarus)	1–1	(Romania) Steaua București	Minsk, Belarus
17:00 EEST (UTC+3)	Dolya 70'	Report	Oprița 89'	Stadium: Traktor; Attendance: 2,500; Referee: Rusmir Mrković (Bosnia and Herzegovina)

28 August 2003 Second leg	Steaua București (Romania)	0–0 (1a–1 agg.)	(Belarus) Neman Grodno	Bucharest, Romania
17:00 EEST (UTC+3)		Report		Stadium: Steaua; Attendance: 20,000; Referee: Mark Halsey (England)

==== First round ====
24 September 2003 First leg	Southampton (England)	1–1	(Romania) Steaua București	Southampton, England
19:45 WEST (UTC+1)	Phillips 52'	Report	Răducanu 20'	Stadium: St Mary's; Attendance: 30,577; Referee: Tommy Skjerven (Norway)

15 October 2003 Second leg	Steaua București (Romania)	1–0 (2–1 agg.)	(England) Southampton	Bucharest, Romania
19:45 EEST (UTC+3)	Răducanu 83'	Report		Stadium: Steaua; Attendance: 25,000; Referee: Stefan Johannesson (Sweden)

==== Second round ====
6 November 2003 First leg	Steaua București (Romania)	1–1	(England) Liverpool	Bucharest, Romania
21:00 EEST (UTC+3)	Răducanu 68'	Report	Traoré 22'	Stadium: Steaua; Attendance: 20,000; Referee: Stefano Farina (Italy)

27 November 2003 Second leg	Liverpool (England)	1–0 (2–1 agg.)	(Romania) Steaua București	Liverpool, England
20:00 WEST (UTC+1)	Kewell 50'	Report		Stadium: Anfield; Attendance: 42,837; Referee: Florian Meyer (Germany)
