= Drinić (surname) =

Drinić is a surname. Notable people with the surname include:

- Anka Drinić (1924–2008), Yugoslav gymnast
- Damir Drinić (born 1989), Serbian footballer
- Darko Drinić (born 1981), Serbian footballer

Drinić surname is 254,831st most common surname in the world. The most people with the surname Drinić live in Bosnia and Herzegovina, a total of 833 people. Apart from Bosnia and Herzegovina, the Drinić live in 5 other countries. The surname is common in Serbia and Slovenia.
