= Roberto Diniță =

Romanian footballer

Personal information
- Full name: Roberto Ioan Diniță
- Date of birth: 10 March 2002 (age 24)
- Place of birth: Bucharest, Romania
- Position: Defensive midfielder

Youth career
- –2021: Dinamo București

Senior career*
Years	Team	Apps	(Gls)
2021–2022	Dinamo București	1	(0)
- * Club domestic league appearances and goals as of 26 July 2021 ‡ National team caps and goals as of 9 April 2021

Roberto Ioan Diniță (born 10 March 2002) is a Romanian professional footballer who plays as a defensive midfielder.

== Club career ==
=== Dinamo București ===
He made his Liga I debut for Dinamo București against FC U Craiova 1948 on 26 July 2021.

== Personal life ==
Roberto Diniță is the son of football manager and former football player Laurențiu Diniță.

== Career statistics ==
=== Club ===
As of match played 11 August 2021

Appearances and goals by club, season and competition
Club	Season	League			National Cup (Note: Includes Cupa României)		Europe		Other (Note: Appearances in Supercupa României)		Total	
Club	Season	Division	Apps	Goals	Apps	Goals	Apps	Goals	Apps	Goals	Apps	Goals
Dinamo București	2021–22	Liga I	1	0	0	0	0	0	0	0	1	0
Career Total			1	0	0	0	0	0	0	0	1	0
