= Fântânele, Suceava =

Fântânele
- Commune
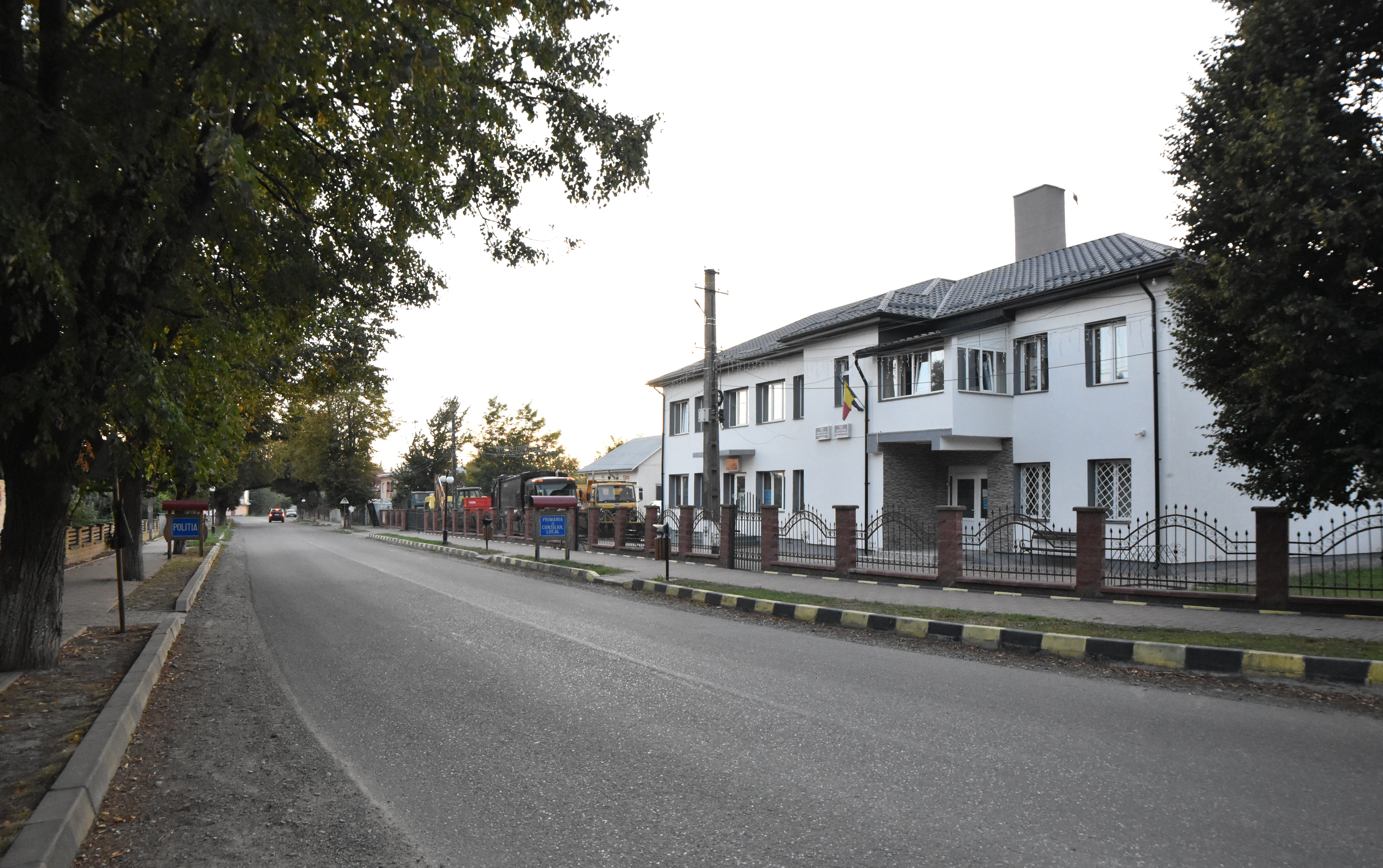
- Fântânele commune town hall and Bănești village centre

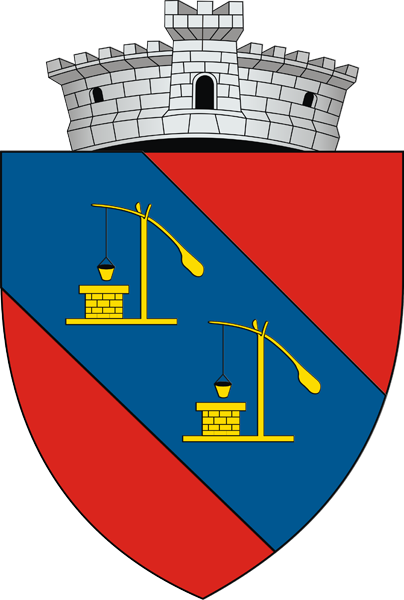
- Coat of arms

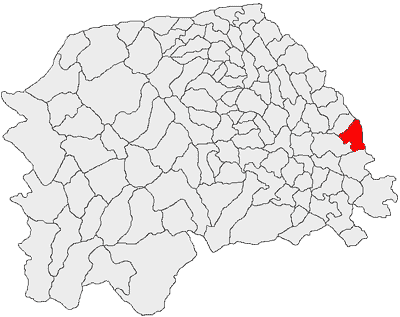
- Location in Suceava County

- Location in Romania
- Coordinates: 47°35′N 26°31′E
- Country: Romania
- County: Suceava
- Subdivisions: Fântânele, Bănești, Cotu Dobei, Slobozia, Stamate

Government
  - Mayor (2024–2028): Vasile-Marian Sabie (PSD)
- Area: 39.81 km^{2} (15.37 sq mi)
- Elevation: 249 m (817 ft)
- Population (2021-12-01): 4,327
  - Density: 108.7/km^{2} (281.5/sq mi)
- Time zone: UTC+02:00 (EET)
  - Summer (DST): UTC+03:00 (EEST)
- Postal code: 727230
- Area code: (+40) x30
- Vehicle reg.: SV
- Website: primariafintinele.ro

Fântânele is a commune located in Suceava County, Western Moldavia, northeastern Romania. It is composed of five villages, namely: Bănești, Cotu Dobei, Fântânele, Slobozia, and Stamate.

== Gallery ==
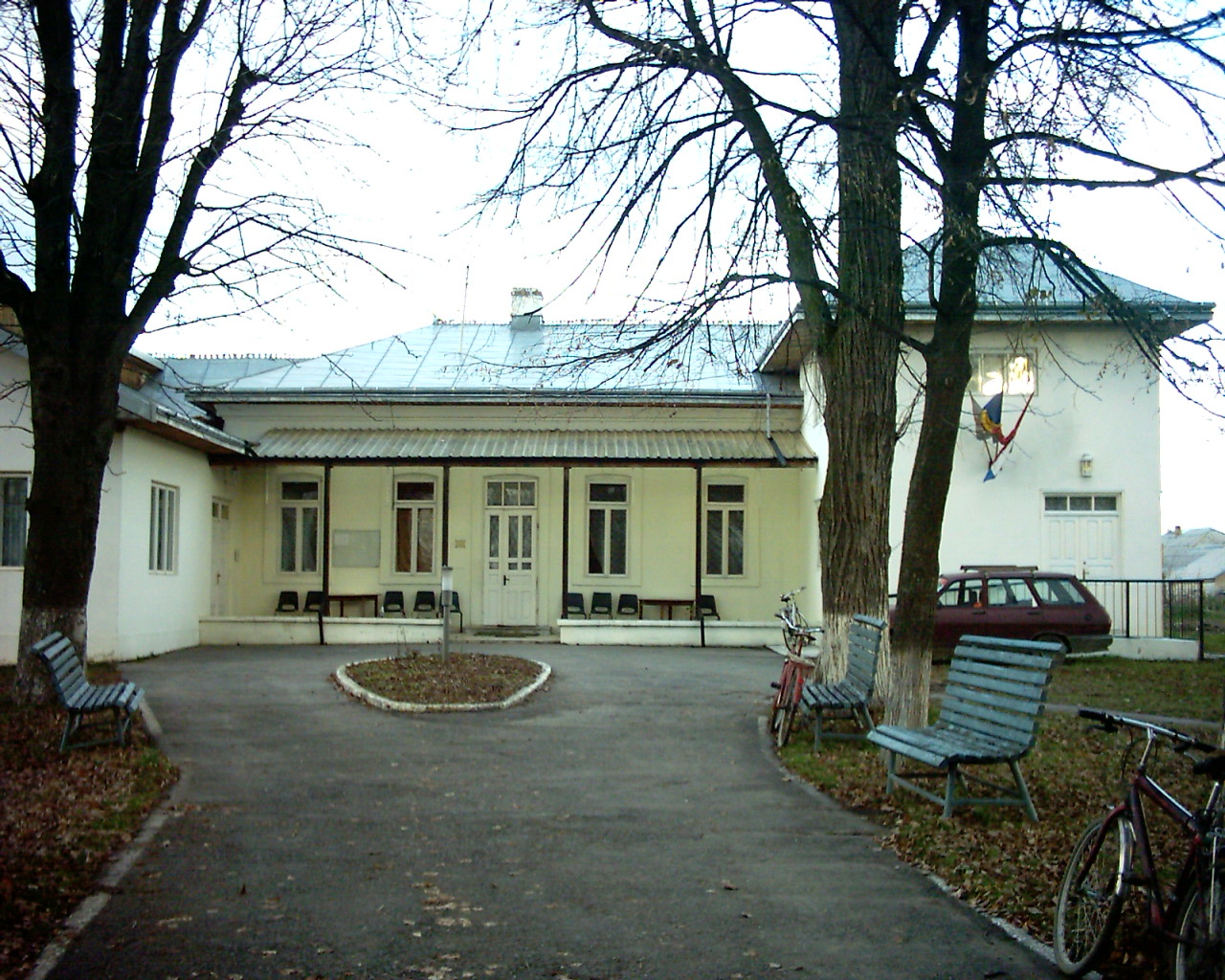
Fântânele Hospital

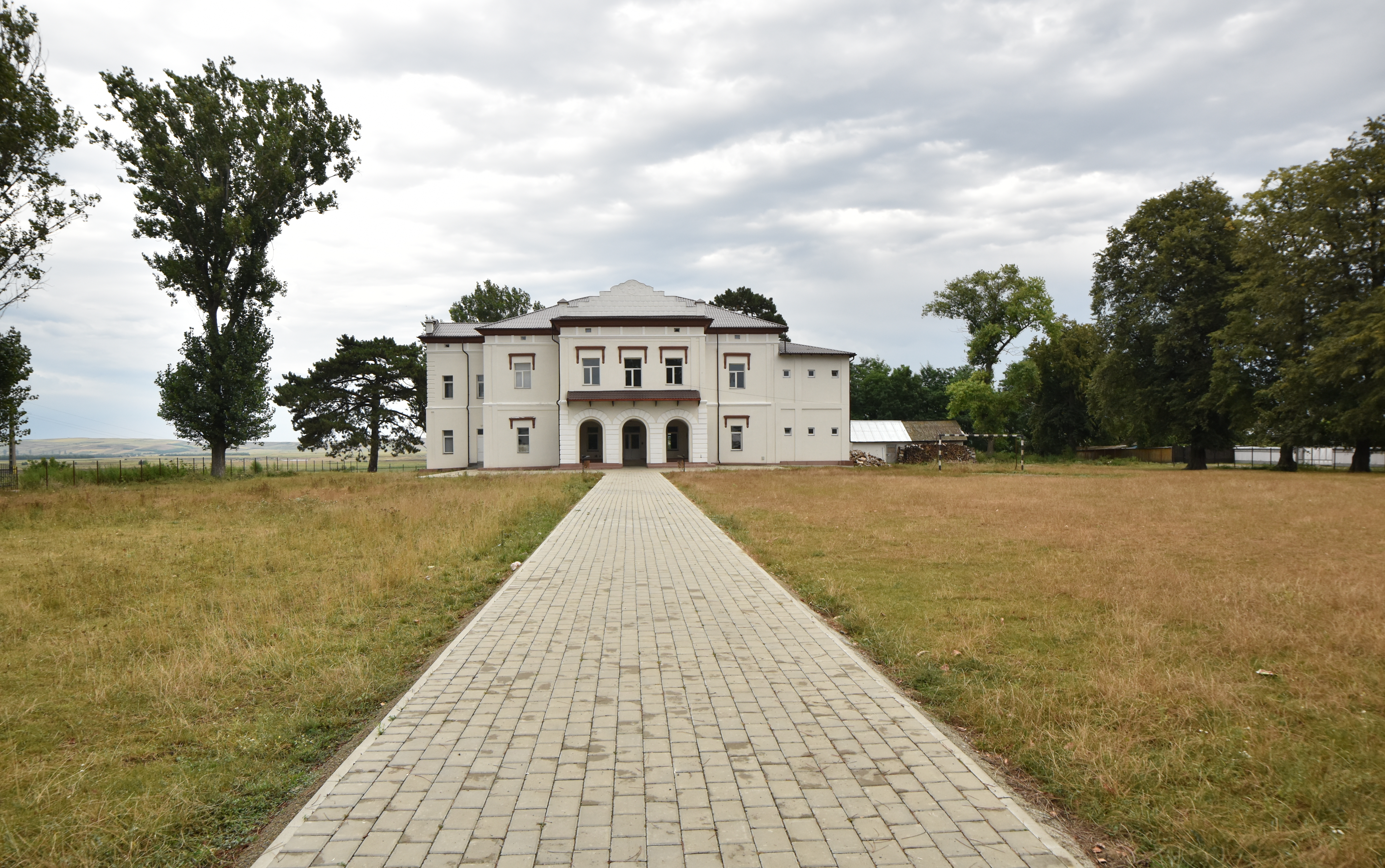
School in Fântânele

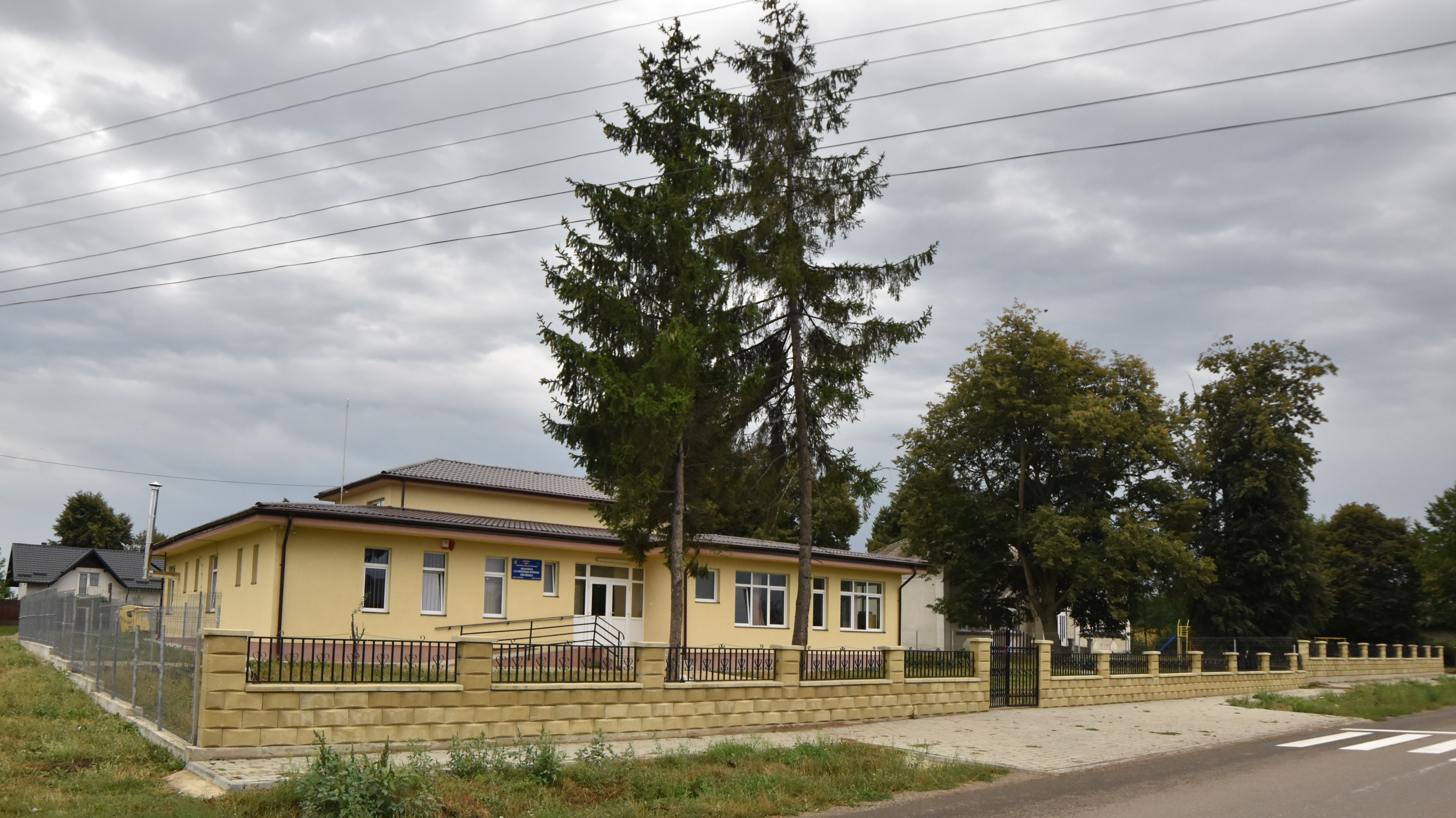
Fântânele kindergarten

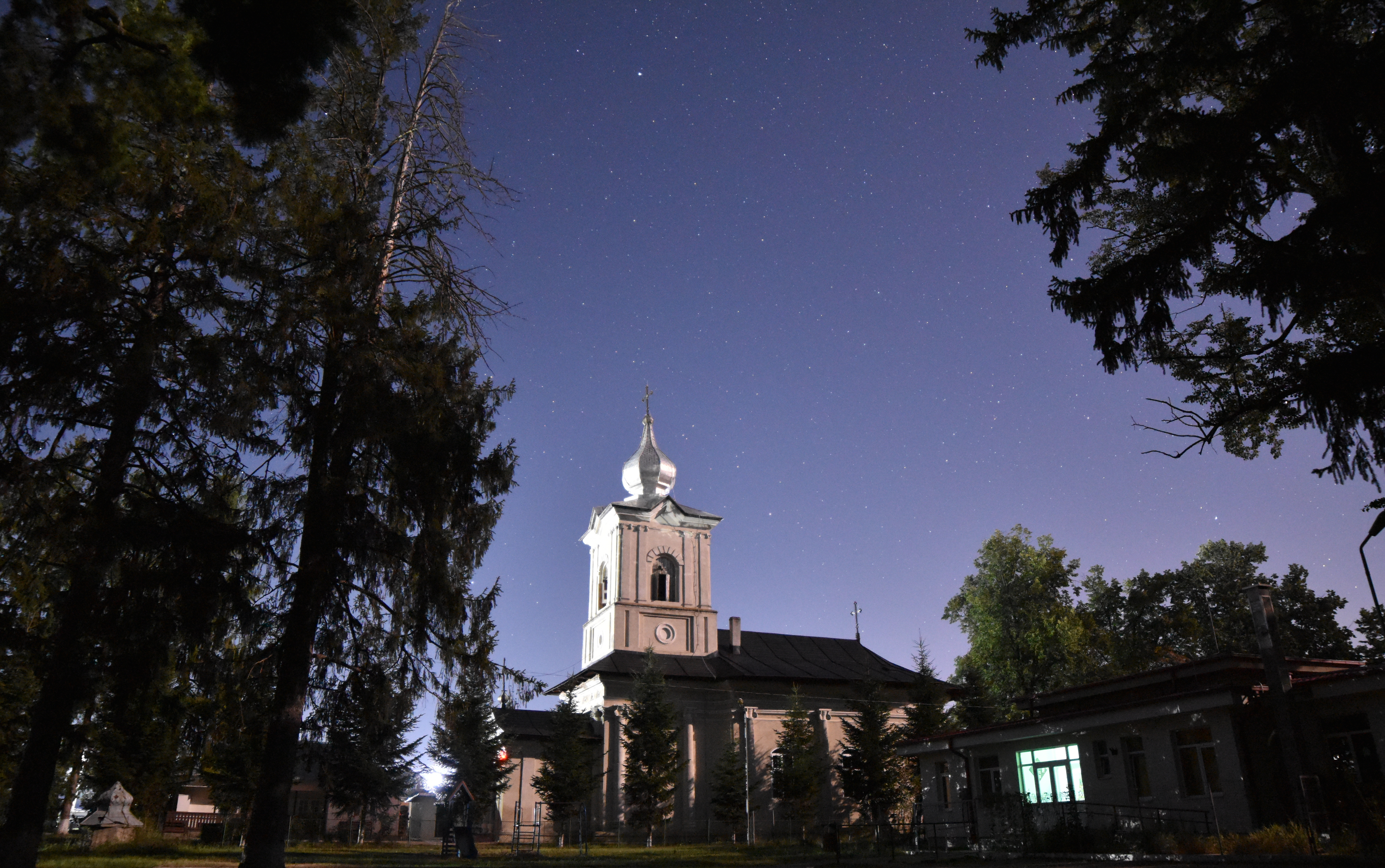
Church in Bănești

Cultural house in Bănești

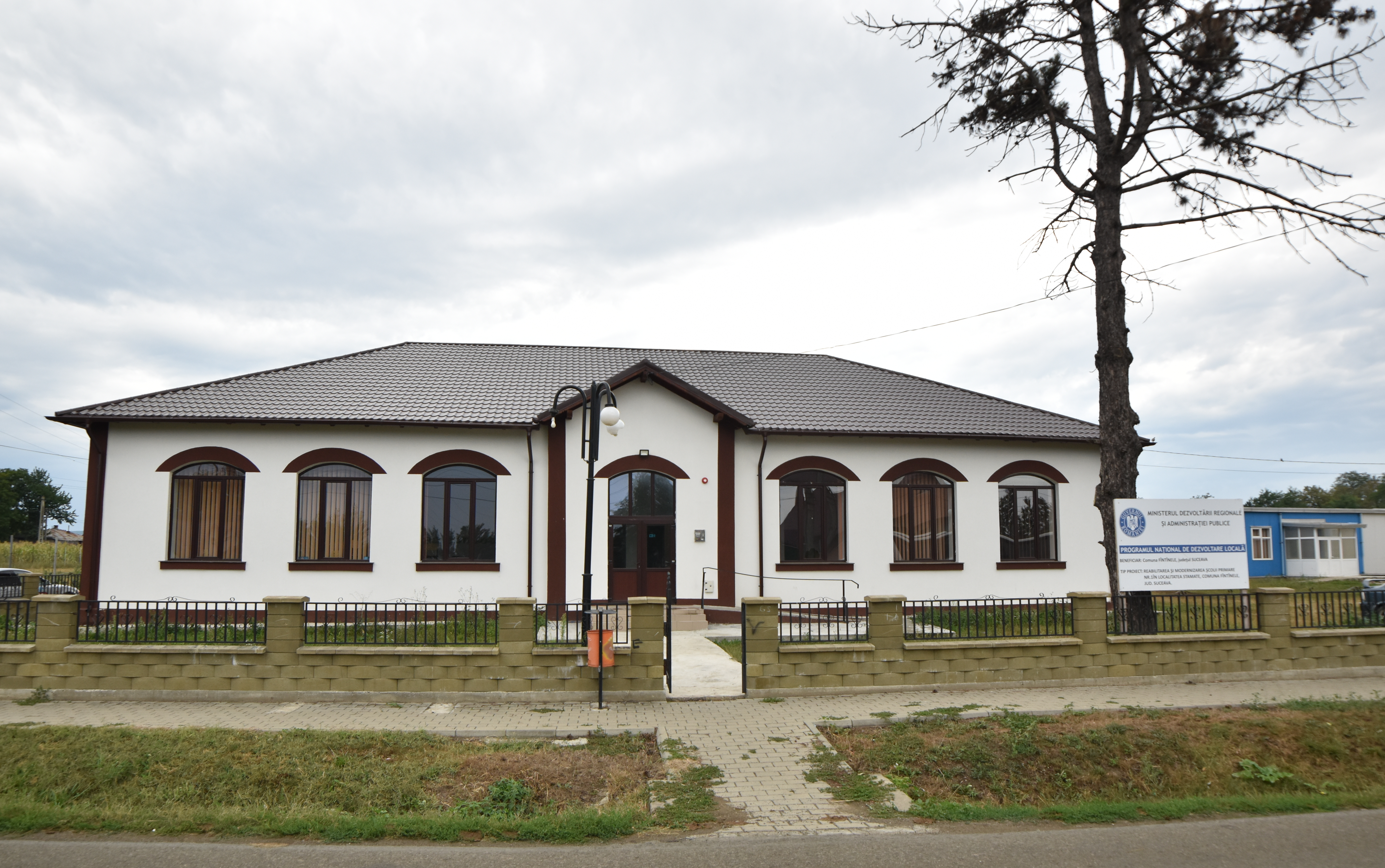
School in Stamate

== Natives ==
- Dorel Bernard (born 1974), footballer
