= Mirel Rădoi =

Romanian association football manager and former player

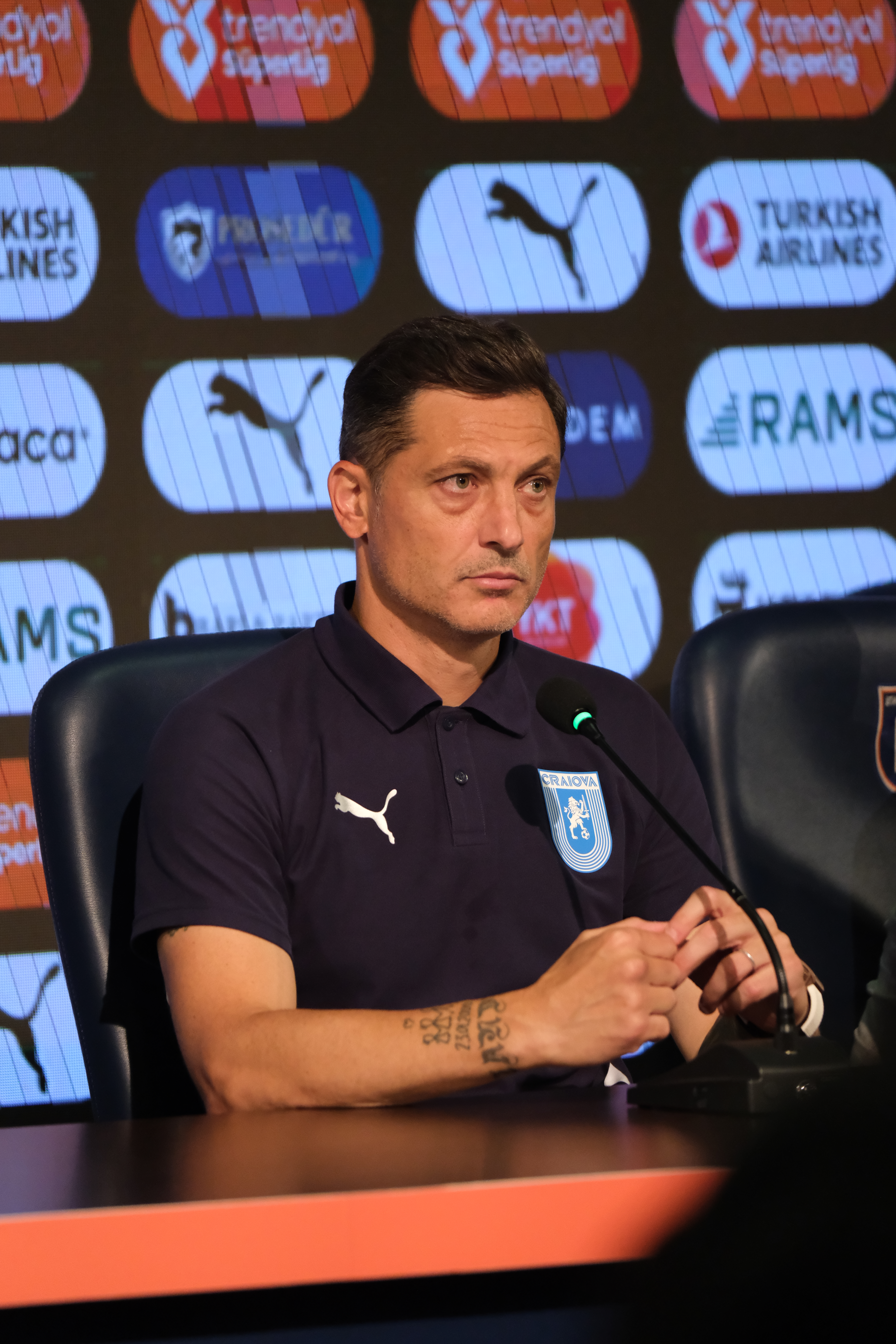
- Rădoi as head coach of U Craiova in 2025

Personal information
- Full name: Mirel Matei Rădoi
- Date of birth: 22 March 1981 (age 45)
- Place of birth: Drobeta-Turnu Severin, Romania
- Height: 1.79 m (5 ft 10 in)
- Positions: Defensive midfielder; centre-back

Youth career
- 1989–1998: CSȘ Turnu-Severin

Senior career*
Years	Team	Apps	(Gls)
1998–1999	Drobeta-Turnu Severin		
1999–2000	Extensiv Craiova	14	(0)
2000–2008	Steaua București	186	(12)
2009–2011	Al-Hilal	52	(10)
2011–2014	Al-Ain	53	(2)
2014–2015	Al-Ahli	7	(0)
2015	Al-Arabi	6	(0)
Total		318	(24)

International career
1998–2000	Romania U21	3	(0)
2000–2010	Romania	68	(2)

Managerial career
- 2015: Steaua București
- 2018: Romania U21 (sporting director)
- 2018–2019: Romania U21
- 2019–2021: Romania
- 2021: Romania Olympic
- 2022: Universitatea Craiova
- 2023: Al-Tai
- 2023–2024: Al Bataeh
- 2024: Al Jazira
- 2025: Universitatea Craiova
- 2026: FCSB
- 2026: Gaziantep
- * Club domestic league appearances and goals

Mirel Matei Rădoi (born 22 March 1981) is a Romanian football manager and former professional player.

A defensive midfielder or a centre-back, Rădoi began his playing career at Extensiv Craiova in 1999, before signing for Steaua București one year later. Following eight-and-a-half seasons in the capital, he spent his later career with Al-Hilal, Al-Ain, Al-Ahli and Al-Arabi. Internationally, Rădoi was capped 68 times by Romania, which he represented at the UEFA Euro 2008.

Rădoi's first stint as a head coach was Steaua București in 2015, where he stayed for six months. Three years later, he was appointed at the helm of the Romania under-21 national team, which he led to the semi-finals of the 2019 UEFA European Championship. This resulted in his promotion to the senior team in November 2019, but left after two years with less success.

== Club career ==
=== Extensiv Craiova ===
Rădoi started to play football at the age of eight, first as a goalkeeper and then as a defender. He started his youth career at Turnu Severin and there he was spotted by Sorin Cârțu, the coach of Extensiv Craiova, who was so impressed by him that he purchased Rădoi in 1999, financing the transfer with his own money. Rădoi made his professional debut in Divizia A in a defeat against Dinamo București on 4 March 2000.

=== Steaua București ===
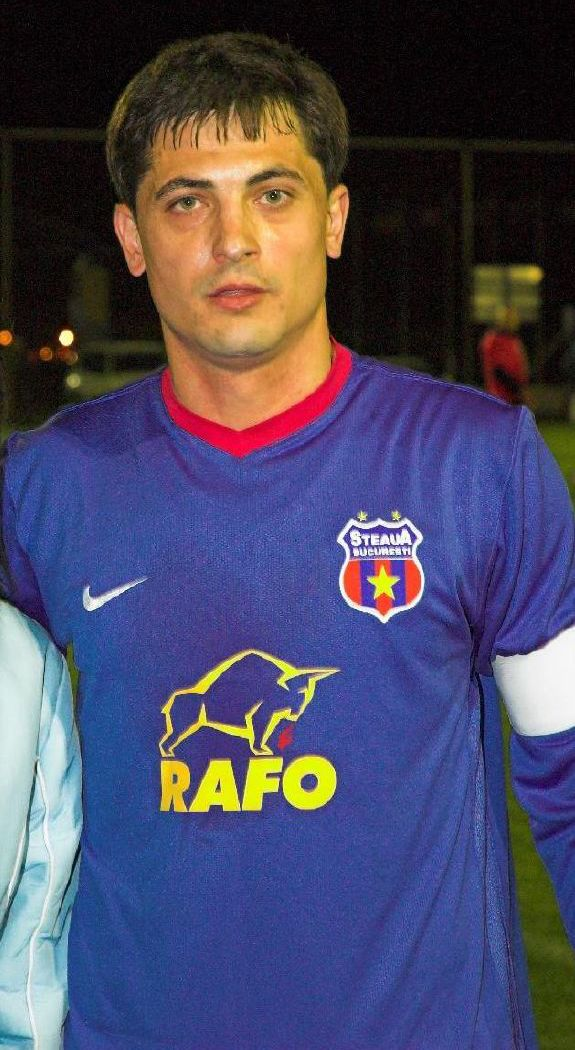
Rădoi with Steaua București in 2007.

Just one year later, in the summer of 2000, Rădoi joined Steaua București for a fee of €110,000. Describing his first day at Steaua, he said, "It was like a positive shock for me. Suddenly I was in the same place with players like Iulian Miu, Marius Baciu and Miodrag Belodedici, players I saw on TV. It was like a dream."

His coach at Steaua was Victor Pițurcă, the former Romania national team coach, who promoted him to the Steaua first team. He then became one of Steaua's most important players. In his first match for the club, a 4–3 victory over FCM Bacău at the Ghencea football stadium, Rădoi scored the equalizer in the ninth minute after Cătălin Cursaru had opened the scoring for Bacău less than a minute before.

Steaua went on to win the Romanian league championship that year, as well as the Supercupa României against rivals Dinamo.

In 2005, Rădoi won his second league title with the club, followed by a third in 2006. On 24 February 2005, he helped Steaua defeat defending champions Valencia in the UEFA Cup. In 2006, Rădoi captained the team in the UEFA Cup semi-finals against Middlesbrough, which Steaua lost 4–3 on aggregate.

In the summer of 2006, a rumour circulated that Rădoi would sign for Premier League club Portsmouth as soon as the transfer window opened in England, with the transfer fee estimated at £11 million. The transfer did not materialize, however, and many speculated that the £11 million offer was no more than a ploy to jack up the player's potential transfer value before a move elsewhere. In the end, Steaua's owner Gigi Becali stated that he would not be selling Rădoi after all.

Rădoi was linked with a move to Inter Milan in October 2008, after manager José Mourinho expressed interest in signing him. Mourinho travelled to Bucharest to meet the player and discuss the potential transfer. However, negotiations collapsed after Steaua owner Gigi Becali demanded a transfer fee of approximately €12–12.5 million, significantly higher than Inter's reported offer of around €7 million.

=== Later career in the Middle East ===
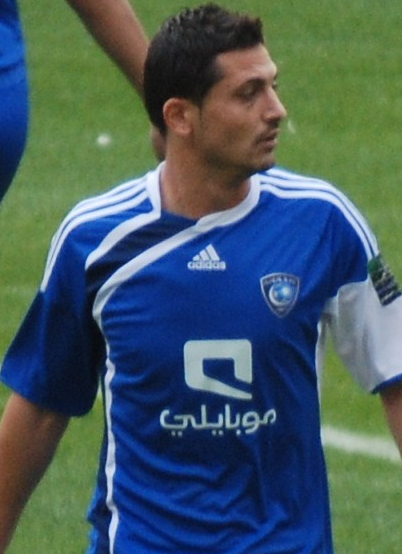
Rădoi with Saudi club Al-Hilal in December 2009

In January 2009, Rădoi signed a three-year contract with Saudi Arabian club Al-Hilal which earned him €1.4 million annually. The transfer fee Steaua București received was in the region of €6 million. Rădoi made his debut for Al-Hilal in the local derby against Al-Nassr, which Al-Hilal won 2–0 with Rădoi scoring the second goal.

In his sixth match with the club, he won the Prince's Cup, defeating Al-Shabab in the final. Nicknamed "The Warrior" by Al-Hilal fans, he was voted Saudi Professional League Player of the Year in 2010. Rădoi spent three years at the club, serving as captain and helping the team win two consecutive league titles.

In June 2011, Rădoi signed with UAE Pro League club Al-Ain for a reported fee of €4.2 million. He agreed to a two-year contract worth €2.5 million per year. In April 2013, he extended his contract by one year, keeping him at the club until the summer of 2014. During his three seasons at Al-Ain, he won several domestic honours, including two consecutive league titles, as well as the UAE President's Cup in 2013–14 and the UAE Super Cup in 2012.

In July 2014, Rădoi signed a two-year contract with Al-Ahli Dubai of the UAE Arabian Gulf League, reuniting with manager Cosmin Olăroiu. He made seven league appearances during the 2014–15 season.

In early 2015, he joined Al-Arabi in the Qatar Stars League. He made six league appearances before announcing his retirement from professional football later that year.

== International career ==
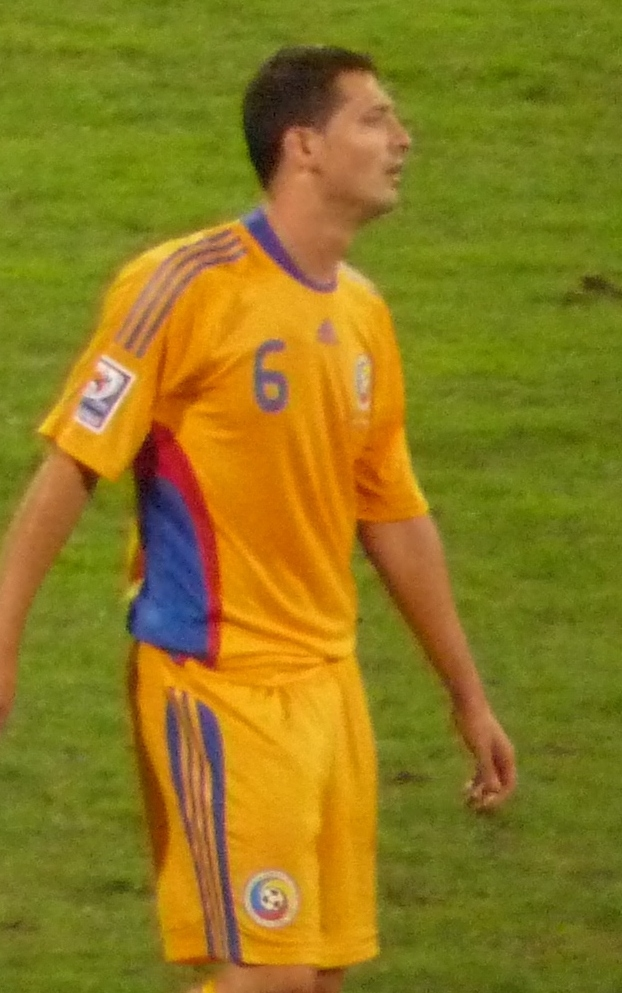
Rădoi with Romania in 2009

Rădoi made his senior debut in a friendly match against Algeria on 5 December 2000. He has been capped 68 times for Romania, scoring two goals. In 2005, Romanian team manager Victor Pițurcă suspended him for leaving training camp without permission before matches against the Netherlands and Armenia. Coach Pițurcă recalled him in February 2006 for a friendly tournament in Cyprus after Rădoi apologised for his behaviour.

Although he was included in Romania's squad for UEFA Euro 2008, he suffered an eye injury and broken nose during the second group game against Italy after clashing heads with team-mate Răzvan Raț, who emerged unscathed. Rădoi played no further part in the tournament. After a confrontation with Răzvan Lucescu in 2010, Rădoi declared that he would retire from the national team.

== Coaching career ==
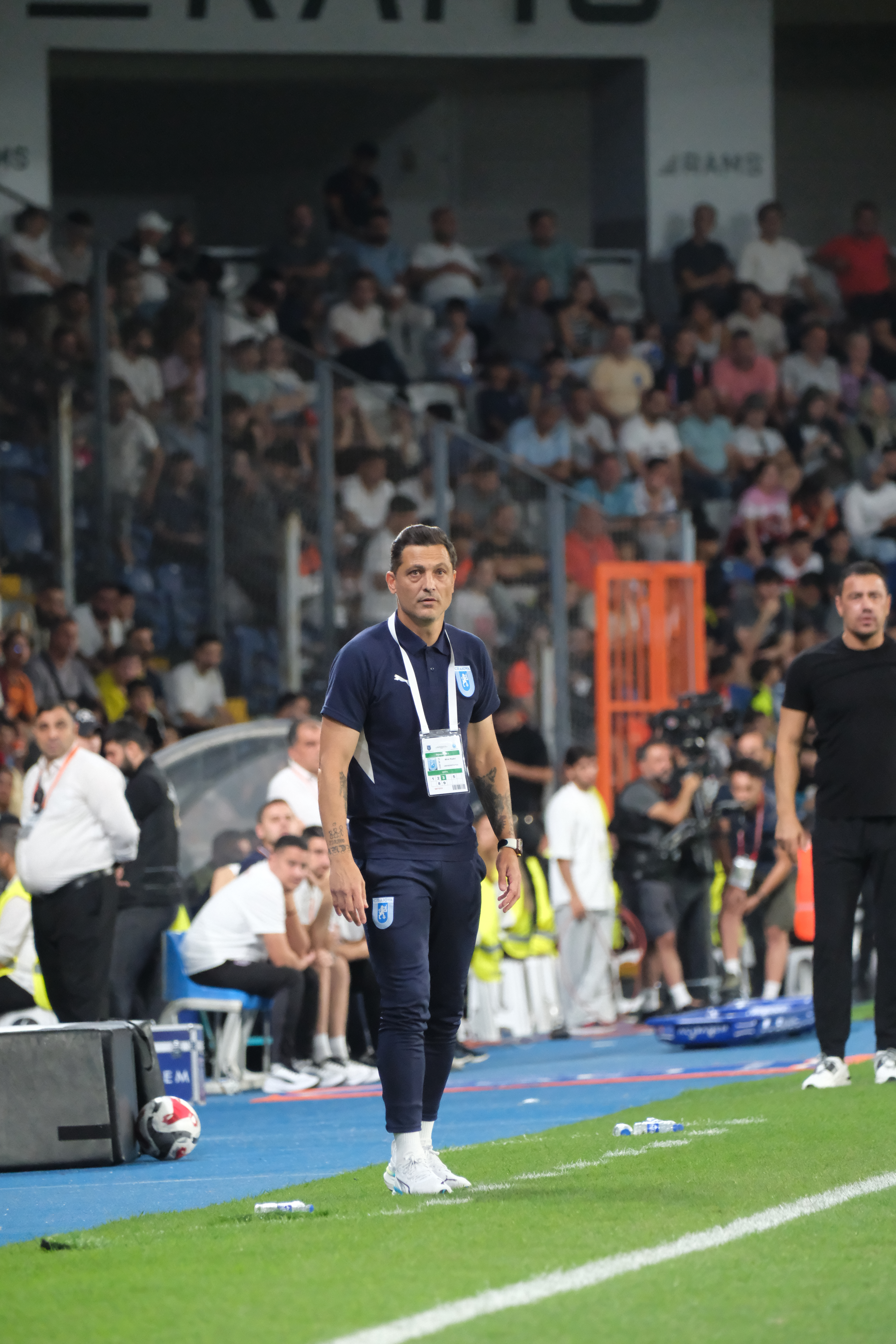
Rădoi, head coach of Universitatea Craiova, during the UEFA Conference League play-off match against İstanbul Başakşehir in August 2025.

He began his managerial career in 2015 with former club Steaua București, where he served as head coach for six months.

In 2018, he was appointed as the head coach of the Romania U21 national team. Under his guidance, the team achieved significant success, notably reaching the semi-finals of the 2019 UEFA European Under-21 Championship, making Romania's best performance in the tournament's history.

Rădoi became the head coach of the Romania national team after the resignation of Cosmin Contra in November 2019.

On 22 January 2023, Rădoi was appointed as manager of Saudi Pro League club Al-Tai. He was sacked by the club on 18 May 2023. He coached Emirati club Al Jazira for three months in 2024.

Rădoi was re-appointed as head coach of Universitatea Craiova on 28 January 2025, marking his second tenure at the club. His return came after a brief managerial hiatus and he took over the club during the latter half of the 2024–25 season. His first match back resulted in a 4–1 home victory against Politehnica Iași in Liga I.

In European competition, Craiova entered the 2025–26 UEFA Conference League qualifying rounds, defeating FK Sarajevo 4–0 in the second qualifying round, Spartak Trnava 3–0 in the third qualifying round, and İstanbul Başakşehir 2–1 away and 3–1 at home in the play-off round, advancing to the league phase with a 5–2 aggregate score.

On 10 November 2025, Rădoi left his position as head coach of Universitatea Craiova by mutual agreement with club owner Mihai Rotaru, following a 1–2 home defeat to UTA Arad in the league. During his time in charge, the club experienced a period of mixed results in domestic competition.

On 10 March 2026, Rădoi returned to lead FCSB until the end of the 2025–26 Liga I season.

== Playing statistics ==
=== Club ===
Appearances and goals by club, season and competition
Club	Season	League			National cup (Note: Includes Cupa României, King's Cup, UAE President's Cup)		Continental		Other		Total	
Club	Season	Division	Apps	Goals	Apps	Goals	Apps	Goals	Apps	Goals	Apps	Goals
Extensiv Craiova	1999–2000	Divizia A	14	0	—		—		—		14	0
Steaua București	2000–01	Divizia A	25	1	3	0	—		—		28	1
Steaua București	2001–02	Divizia A	22	1	5	1	5 (Note: Three appearances in UEFA Champions League, two appearances in UEFA Cup)	0	1 (Note: Appearance in Supercupa României)	0	33	2
Steaua București	2002–03	Divizia A	23	1	2	0	—		—		25	1
Steaua București	2003–04	Divizia A	29	2	2	1	6 (Note: Appearances in UEFA Cup)	0	—		37	3
Steaua București	2004–05	Divizia A	20	1	0	0	8	0	—		28	1
Steaua București	2005–06	Divizia A	24	4	1	0	17 (Note: Four appearances and one goal in UEFA Champions League, thirteen appearances and two goals in UEFA Cup)	3	0	0	42	7
Steaua București	2006–07	Liga I	14	1	1	0	4 (Note: Two appearances in UEFA Champions League, two appearances i UEFA Cup)	0	0	0	19	1
Steaua București	2007–08	Liga I	16	0	0	0	3 (Note: Appearances in UEFA Champions League)	0	—		19	0
Steaua București	2008–09	Liga I	13	1	0	0	7	0	—		20	1
Steaua București	Total		186	12	14	2	50	3	1	0	251	17
Al-Hilal	2008–09	Saudi Pro League	13	2	0	0	6 (Note: Appearances in AFC Champions League)	3	—		19	5
Al-Hilal	2009–10	Saudi Pro League	19	2	10	2	8	0	—		37	4
Al-Hilal	2010–11	Saudi Pro League	20	6	7	4	7	1	—		34	11
Al-Hilal	Total		52	10	17	6	21	4	0	0	90	20
Al Ain	2011–12	UAE Pro League	19	0	9	3	0	0	0	0	28	3
Al Ain	2012–13	UAE Pro League	20	2	5	0	6	0	4	0	35	2
Al Ain	2013–14	UAE Pro League	14	0	5	1	5	0	3	0	27	1
Al Ain	Total		53	2	19	4	11	0	7	0	90	6
Al-Ahli	2014–15	UAE Pro League	7	0	3	0	—		—		10	0
Al-Arabi	2014–15	Qatar Stars League	6	0	—		—		—		6	0
Career total			318	24	53	12	82	7	8	0	461	43

=== International ===
Appearances and goals by national team and year
National team	Year	Apps	Goals
Romania	2000	2	0
Romania	2001	9	0
Romania	2002	7	1
Romania	2003	10	0
Romania	2004	3	0
Romania	2005	3	0
Romania	2006	5	0
Romania	2007	3	0
Romania	2008	8	0
Romania	2009	10	0
Romania	2010	8	1
Total		68	2

Scores and results list Romania's goal tally first, score column indicates score after each Rădoi goal.

List of international goals scored by Mirel Rădoi
No.	Date	Venue	Opponent	Score	Result	Competition
1	16 October 2002	Stade Josy Barthel, Luxembourg, Luxembourg	Luxembourg	3–0	7–0	UEFA Euro 2004 qualifying
2	5 June 2010	Sankt Veit an der Glan, Carinthia, Austria	Honduras	3–0	3–0	Friendly

== Managerial statistics ==
As of match played 29 August 2026

Team	From	To	Record							
Team	From	To	G	W	D	L	GF	GA	GD	Win %
(Romania) Steaua București	1 June 2015	30 November 2015	29	13	7	9	39	33	+6	44.83
Romania U21	3 August 2018	26 November 2019	16	10	3	3	35	15	+20	62.50
Romania	26 November 2019	30 November 2021	20	8	4	8	28	25	+3	40.00
Romania Olympic	1 July 2021	7 August 2021	3	1	1	1	1	4	−3	33.33
(Romania) Universitatea Craiova	9 August 2022	7 December 2022	21	10	6	5	27	21	+6	47.62
(Saudi Arabia) Al-Tai	22 January 2023	18 May 2023	13	4	4	5	21	23	−2	30.77
(United Arab Emirates) Al Bataeh	25 May 2023	25 December 2023	14	4	4	6	17	26	−9	28.57
(United Arab Emirates) Al Jazira	5 January 2024	9 April 2024	7	1	1	5	11	17	−6	14.29
(Romania) Universitatea Craiova	28 January 2025	10 November 2025	44	23	10	11	74	47	+27	52.27
(Romania) FCSB	10 March 2026	21 April 2026	5	3	1	1	10	5	+5	60.00
(Turkey) Gaziantep	22 April 2026	31 August 2026	7	1	1	5	5	12	−7	14.29
Total			179	78	42	59	268	228	+40	43.58

== Honours ==
=== Player ===
Steaua București

- Divizia A: 2000–01, 2004–05, 2005–06
- Supercupa României: 2001, 2006

Al-Hilal

- Saudi Professional League: 2009–10, 2010–11
- Crown Prince Cup: 2008–09, 2009–10, 2010–11

Al-Ain

- UAE Pro-League: 2011–12, 2012–13
- UAE Super Cup: 2012
- UAE President's Cup: 2013–14

Individual

- Gazeta Sporturilor Romanian Footballer of the Year runner-up: 2005
- Saudi Professional League Player of the Year: 2010

=== Manager ===
Universitatea Craiova

- UEFA Conference League group stage: 2025-2026
