= Tiberiu Curt =

Romanian former professional footballer

Personal information
- Full name: Tiberiu Cristian Curt
- Date of birth: 26 April 1975 (age 51)
- Place of birth: Medgidia, Romania
- Height: 1.83 m (6 ft 0 in)
- Position: Defender

Team information
- Current team: Farul Constanța (vice-president)

Youth career
- 1987–1992: Farul Constanța

Senior career*
Years	Team	Apps	(Gls)
1992–1994	Farul Constanța	69	(4)
1994–1995	Rapid București	8	(1)
1995–1998	Universitatea Craiova	82	(2)
1998–2003	Național București	135	(3)
2003–2005	Steaua București	18	(1)
2006	Dinamo București	7	(2)
2006–2007	Național București	0	(0)
Total		319	(13)

International career
1996	Romania	2	(0)

Managerial career
- 2018–2021: Farul Constanța (sporting director)
- 2021–: Farul Constanța (vice-president)
- * Club domestic league appearances and goals

Tiberiu Cristian Curt (born 26 April 1975) is a Romanian former professional footballer who played as a defender, currently he is the vice-president of Liga I club Farul Constanța.

== Club career ==
In his career Curt played 319 matches in the Liga I for teams like: Farul Constanța, Rapid București, FC U Craiova, Steaua București and Dinamo București, but most of the matches he played were for Național București, 135. Despite the fact that he started his football career very late, at 12 years old, Tiberiu Curt is part of a small group of players who played for all three important teams of Bucharest: Steaua, Dinamo and Rapid.

== International career ==
Tiberiu Curt played for Romania only in 2 matches, in 1996, against Israel and United Arab Emirates.

== Career statistics ==
=== International ===
Appearances and goals by national team and year
National team	Year	Apps	Goals
Romania	1996	2	0
Total		2	5

== Honours ==
Rapid București

- Cupa României runner-up: 1994–95

Universitatea Craiova

- Cupa României runner-up: 1997–98

Național București

- Cupa României runner-up: 2002–03

Steaua București

- Divizia A: 2004–05
- Supercupa României runner-up: 2005
