= Sorin Paraschiv =

Romanian footballer (born 1981)

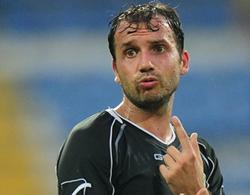
- Paraschiv with Volyn Lutsk in 2010

Personal information
- Full name: Sorin Ioan Paraschiv
- Date of birth: 17 June 1981 (age 45)
- Place of birth: Alexandria, Romania
- Height: 1.76 m (5 ft 9 in)
- Position: Defensive midfielder

Team information
- Current team: Bihor Oradea (sporting director)

Youth career
- 1990–1992: CSȘ Alexandria
- 1992–2000: Steaua București

Senior career*
Years	Team	Apps	(Gls)
2000–2007	Steaua București	168	(12)
2007–2009	Rimini	49	(3)
2009–2010	Unirea Urziceni	28	(0)
2010–2011	Volyn Lutsk	11	(2)
2012	Farul Constanța	2	(0)
2012–2013	Concordia Chiajna	17	(0)
2013	Juventus Bascov	3	(0)
Total		278	(17)

International career
1996–1997	Romania U16	7	(1)
2000–2001	Romania U21	2	(0)
2004–2007	Romania	4	(0)

Managerial career
- 2017–2018: Voința Turnu Măgurele (sporting director)
- 2018–2021: Academica Clinceni (sporting director)
- 2022–2023: Chindia Târgoviște (sporting director)
- 2023–2024: Foresta Suceava (president)
- 2024–2026: CSM Alexandria (team manager)
- 2026–: Bihor Oradea (sporting director)
- * Club domestic league appearances and goals

Sorin Ioan Paraschiv (born 17 June 1981) is a Romanian former professional footballer who played as a midfielder, currently sporting director at Liga II club Bihor Oradea.

== Club career ==
=== Steaua București (1999–2007) ===
After being a member of the Steaua youth Academy, where Paraschiv started to play football in 1992, aged 11, in 1999, aged 18, he signed his first professional contract with Steaua.

He made his first appearance in Divizia A in 2000, when he was only 19 years old, in a match versus FC Extensiv Craiova won by his team with 3–0.

Even though he only played only 1 game in his first season, Steaua won the championship title that year. Starting from the 2001–02 season Paraschiv became an essential player for Steaua and because of his performances constantly good he became the vice-captain of the team after Steaua's main leader Mirel Rădoi.

After three seasons in which Steaua finished on the second place, Paraschiv and his teammates succeeded to win the champion title in two consecutive seasons (2004–05, 2005–06).

Even though he only scored eleven times in 139 games Paraschiv has an important place in the coordination of Steaua's play. He played 34 games and he scored three times in the European cups. He debuted in the 2002–03 season in the qualifiers for UEFA Champions League when Steaua was eliminated by Dynamo Kyiv.

He played in two other seasons in UEFA Cup but his climbing in the European Cups started in the 2004–05 season in UEFA Cup. Although Steaua defeated teams like Valencia, the ex-winner of UEFA Cup, Beşiktaş and Standard Liège was eliminated in 1/8 finals by Villarreal.

Next season after they were eliminated from UEFA Champions League qualifiers by Rosenborg, Steaua played in UEFA Cup and reached the semifinal phase. They had important victories against Lens, SC Heerenveen, Real Betis and against their rivals from the internal competition, Rapid București in the quarter-final. They were stopped in the semifinal after two dramatic games by Middlesbrough.

In the season 2006–07 season they succeeded to qualify in UEFA Champions League in a group with Real Madrid, Olympique Lyonnais and Dynamo Kyiv after they defeated Standard Liège in the qualifiers.

He played at Steaua until 2007, winning three Romanian championships (2000–01, 2004–05, 2005–06) and two Romanian Super Cups.

=== Rimini (2007–2009) ===
On 4 July 2007 Italian Serie B club Rimini officially announced to have signed him. Paraschiv's contract with Rimini is due to expire in June 2011.

=== Unirea Urziceni (2009–2010) ===
On 30 June 2009 he left Italy and returned to his homeland to sign with Unirea Urziceni.

== International career ==
For the national team Sorin Paraschiv debuted in 2004 in a game against Andorra, which ended with the Romanians victory (5-1). He also played in another three games against Armenia, Ivory Coast and Nigeria but did not score anytime.

== Career statistics ==
Appearances and goals by national team and year
National team	Year	Apps	Goals
Romania	2004	2	0
Romania	2005	2	0
Total		4	0

== Honours ==
=== Player ===
Steaua București

- Divizia A: 2000–01, 2004–05, 2005–06
- Supercupa României: 2001, 2006

Unirea Urziceni

- Supercupa României runner-up: 2009, 2010
