= Dorel Bernard =

Romanian former professional footballer

Personal information
- Date of birth: 2 March 1974 (age 52)
- Place of birth: Fântânele, Romania
- Height: 1.82 m (6 ft 0 in)
- Position: Defender

Youth career
- CSM Suceava

Senior career*
Years	Team	Apps	(Gls)
1992–1997	Bucovina Suceava	64	(1)
1997	Foresta II Fălticeni	12	(1)
1998–2002	Foresta Fălticeni	86	(3)
2002–2007	Politehnica Iași	105	(9)
2008–2010	Cetatea Suceava	44	(1)
Total		311	(15)
- * Club domestic league appearances and goals as of 31 October 2018

Dorel Bernard (born 2 March 1974) is a Romanian former professional footballer who played as a defender. In his career Bernard played mainly for teams from Suceava County, such as: Bucovina Suceava, Foresta Fălticeni and Cetatea Suceava, but he also played in more than 100 matches for Politehnica Iași, club whose captain was for several times.

== Honours ==
Politehnica Iași

- Divizia B: 2003–04

Cetatea Suceava

- Liga III: 2007–08
