= Laurențiu Diniță =

Romanian footballer and manager

Laurenţiu Diniţă
Personal information
- Full name: Laurenţiu Nicolae Diniţă
- Date of birth: 29 March 1975 (age 51)
- Place of birth: Bucharest, Romania
- Height: 1.70 m (5 ft 7 in)
- Position: Striker

Senior career*
Years	Team	Apps	(Gls)
1995–1996	Electromagnetica București	20	(145)
1996–2003	Sportul Studenţesc	202	(65)
2003–2006	FCSB	48	(7)
2006	→ Jiul Petroşani (loan)	13	(3)
2006–2008	Aris Limassol	46	(8)
2008–2011	Concordia Chiajna	60	(24)
Total		369	(107)

Managerial career
- 2011: Concordia Chiajna
- 2012–2013: Berceni
- 2013: Fortuna Poiana Câmpina
- 2014–2015: Concordia II Chiajna
- 2015–2016: Concordia Chiajna (assistant)
- 2016–2017: Dinamo II București
- 2017–2018: Balotești
- 2018–2019: Dinamo București (youth)
- 2019: Sportul Snagov (assistant)
- 2019: Concordia Chiajna
- 2020: Alexandria
- 2020–2021: Turris Turnu Măgurele (assistant)
- * Club domestic league appearances and goals

Laurenţiu Diniţă (born 29 March 1975) is a Romanian football manager and former player.

== Personal life ==
Born in Bucharest, Laurenţiu Diniță is the father of football player Roberto Diniță.

== Coaching statistics ==
As of 27 November 2011

Team	From	To	Record						
Team	From	To	G	W	D	L	GF	GA	Win %
Concordia Chiajna	5 March 2011	17 December 2011	31	10	10	11	31	39	32.26
Total			31	10	10	11	31	39	32.26

== Honours ==
Sportul Studențesc

- Liga II: 2000–01

Steaua București

- Liga I: 2004–05
