= Gabriel Boștină =

Romanian footballer

Personal information
- Date of birth: 22 May 1977 (age 49)
- Place of birth: Gura Văii, Romania
- Height: 1.82 m (6 ft 0 in)
- Position: Midfielder

Team information
- Current team: CSA Steaua București (technical director)

Youth career
- 1992–1997: Severnav Drobeta Turnu-Severin

Senior career*
Years	Team	Apps	(Gls)
1997–1998	Severnav Drobeta Turnu-Severin		
1998–1999	Cimentul Fieni	30	(9)
1999–2002	Oțelul Galați	82	(2)
2002–2007	Steaua București	117	(17)
2007–2010	Dinamo București	73	(2)
2010–2012	Universitatea Cluj	52	(6)
2013	CS Turnu Severin	0	(0)
Total		354	(36)

International career
2005–2006	Romania	4	(0)

Managerial career
- 2020–2023: CSA Steaua București (assistant)
- 2023–: CSA Steaua București (technical director)
- * Club domestic league appearances and goals

Gabriel Boștină (born 22 May 1977) is a former Romanian professional footballer who played as a midfielder, currently technical director at Liga II club CSA Steaua București.

== Club career ==
=== Early career ===
Boștină was born on 22 May 1977 in Gura Văii, Romania and began playing junior-level football in 1992 at Severnav Drobeta Turnu-Severin. He started to play for the club's senior team during the 1997–98 Divizia C season. In 1998, he joined Divizia B club Cimentul Fieni. One year later, he moved to Oțelul Galați, making his Divizia A debut on 24 July 1999 under coach Dumitru Dumitriu in a 3–2 away win over Gloria Bistrița.

=== Steaua București ===
In 2002, Boștină was transferred from Oțelul to Steaua București for a €250,000 fee. On 23 March 2003, he scored a goal in a 4–2 victory over rivals Dinamo București. He appeared in six matches during the 2003–04 UEFA Cup edition, as Steaua eliminated Neman Grodno and Southampton in the first two rounds, then after a 1–1 draw in the first leg against Liverpool, they lost the away leg 1–0, bringing their campaign to an end. Subsequently, Boștină helped the team win the 2004–05 title under coaches Walter Zenga and Dumitru Dumitriu by contributing with five goals in 26 league appearances. In the same season, he played 10 games in the UEFA Cup, helping Steaua advance past title holders Valencia in the campaign, reaching the round of 16 where the journey ended in favor of Villarreal.

Boștină started the 2005–06 season by playing the entire match in the 3–2 loss to Dinamo in the Supercupa României. Throughout the season, Boștină scored four goals in 27 league matches under coaches Oleh Protasov and Cosmin Olăroiu to help Steaua win another championship. He also made 12 appearances in the UEFA Cup campaign, scoring once as his side defeated Vålerenga in the first round, before they were eliminated by Middlesbrough in the semi-finals. In the following season, Steaua got past HIT Gorica and Standard Liège —with Boștină scoring one goal against the first— in the 2006–07 Champions League qualifying rounds, reaching the group stage. There, Boștină made two appearances in losses to Lyon and Real Madrid.

=== Late career ===
In September 2007, Boștină moved from Steaua to Dinamo for a €100,000 transfer fee. He helped the club achieve what was dubbed "The wonder from Liberec" by winning the away game 3–0 against Slovan Liberec to force a penalty shoot-out after losing the first leg by the same score, ultimately qualifying for the 2009–10 Europa League group stage. There, Boștină scored a goal in a 4–1 loss to Galatasaray.

Boștină left Dinamo and signed a contract with Universitatea Cluj in June 2010. He made his last Liga I appearance on 20 May 2012 in a 1–0 away loss to FC Vaslui, totaling 324 matches with 27 goals in the competition. Boștină ended his career after playing from April 2013 to July the same year for CS Turnu Severin.

== International career ==
Boștină played four friendly matches for Romania, making his debut on 12 November 2005, when coach Victor Pițurcă sent him in the 69th minute to replace Dorinel Munteanu in a 2–1 loss to Ivory Coast. His last appearance for the national team took place on 26 May 2006 in a 2–0 win over Northern Ireland.

== Personal life ==
On 29 March 2006, Boștină was decorated by the President of Romania, Traian Băsescu, with the Ordinul "Meritul Sportiv" (Order of "Sporting Merit"), Class II, for his contribution to reaching the 2005–06 UEFA Cup quarter-finals with Steaua București.

== Career statistics ==
=== International ===
Appearances and goals by national team and year
National team	Year	Apps	Goals
Romania	2005	2	0
Romania	2006	2	0
Total		4	0

== Honours ==
=== Player ===
Steaua București

- Divizia A: 2004–05, 2005–06
- Supercupa României runner-up: 2005
