= Darko Drinić =

Serbian footballer

Darko Drinić Дарко Дринић
Personal information
- Full name: Darko Drinić
- Date of birth: 27 October 1981 (age 45)
- Place of birth: Titel, SFR Yugoslavia
- Height: 1.83 m (6 ft 0 in)
- Position: Striker

Senior career*
Years	Team	Apps	(Gls)
2001–2003	Novi Sad	57	(18)
2004–2005	Železnik	34	(4)
2005–2006	Borac Čačak	20	(1)
2006	Voždovac	10	(0)
2007	Dalian Shide	16	(2)
2008	Bnei Sakhnin	3	(0)
2009	Veternik		
2009–2010	Novi Sad	26	(2)
2010–2012	Sloga Kraljevo	53	(14)
2012–2013	Proleter Novi Sad	32	(13)
2013–2015	Kolubara	50	(21)
2015	Železničar Lajkovac		
2016	Polet Ljubić		
Total		301	(75)
- * Club domestic league appearances and goals

Darko Drinić (Serbian Cyrillic: Дарко Дринић; born 27 October 1981) is a Serbian retired footballer who played as a striker.

== Career ==
During his journeyman career, Drinić played for Novi Sad (twice), Železnik, Borac Čačak, Voždovac, Dalian Shide, Bnei Sakhnin, Veternik, Sloga Kraljevo, Proleter Novi Sad, Kolubara, Železničar Lajkovac, and Polet Ljubić.

== Honours ==
Železnik

- Serbia and Montenegro Cup: 2004–05

Sloga Kraljevo

- Serbian League West: 2010–11

Kolubara

- Serbian League Belgrade: 2013–14
