= 2004–05 Divizia A =

87th season of top-tier football league in Romania

Divizia A
- Season: 2004–05
- Champions: Steaua București
- Relegated: Apulum Alba Iulia; Brașov; Universitatea Craiova
- Champions League: Steaua București
- UEFA Cup: Dinamo București; Rapid București
- Intertoto Cup: CFR Cluj; Gloria Bistrița
- Matches played: 240
- Goals scored: 586 (2.44 per match)
- Top goalscorer: Gheorghe Bucur, Claudiu Niculescu (21)
- Biggest home win: Național 6–0 Poli Iași
- Biggest away win: FC U 0–6 Oțelul
- Highest scoring: Argeș 4–3 Gloria; Gloria 6–1 Apulum; Gloria 4–3 FC U
- Longest winning run: Dinamo, Național (6)
- Longest unbeaten run: Steaua (12)
- Longest winless run: CFR (11)
- Longest losing run: Brașov (6)

The 2004–05 Divizia A was the eighty-seventh season of Divizia A, the top-level football league of Romania. Season began in July 2004 and ended in June 2005. Steaua București became champions on 11 June 2005.

== Team changes ==
=== Relegated ===
The teams that were relegated to the Divizia B at the end of the previous season:

- Ceahlăul Piatra Neamț
- Petrolul Ploiești
- Bihor Oradea

=== Promoted ===
The teams that were promoted from the Divizia B at the start of the season:

- Politehnica Iași
- Sportul Studențesc
- CFR Cluj

=== Venues ===
Politehnica Timișoara	Steaua București	Universitatea Craiova	Rapid București
Dan Păltinișanu	Steaua	Ion Oblemenco	Giulești-Valentin Stănescu
Capacity: 32,972	Capacity: 28,365	Capacity: 25,252	Capacity: 19,100
Apulum Alba Iulia	FCM Bacău	Farul Constanța	Dinamo București
Victoria-Cetate	Municipal	Gheorghe Hagi	Dinamo
Capacity: 18,000	Capacity: 17,500	Capacity: 15,520	Capacity: 15,032
Argeș Pitești	2004–05 Divizia A (Romania) Location of Bucharest teams.		Național București
Nicolae Dobrin	2004–05 Divizia A (Romania) Location of Bucharest teams.		Cotroceni
Capacity: 15,000	2004–05 Divizia A (Romania) Location of Bucharest teams.		Capacity: 14,542
Oțelul Galați	2004–05 Divizia A (Romania) Location of Bucharest teams.		Politehnica Iași
Oțelul	2004–05 Divizia A (Romania) Location of Bucharest teams.		Emil Alexandrescu
Capacity: 13,500	2004–05 Divizia A (Romania) Location of Bucharest teams.		Capacity: 11,390
Sportul Studențesc	CFR Cluj	FC Brașov	Gloria Bistrița
Regie	CFR	Tineretului	Gloria
Capacity: 10,020	Capacity: 10,000	Capacity: 10,000	Capacity: 7,800

=== Personnel and kits ===
Team	Head coach	Captain	Kit manufacturer	Shirt Sponsor
Apulum Alba Iulia	(Romania) Marcel Rusu	(Romania) Vasile Jercălău	Lotto	Bergenbier
Argeș Pitești	(Romania) Sorin Cârțu	(Romania) Marius Radu	Erreà	Pic
Brașov	(Romania) Ferenc Bajkó	(Romania) Cosmin Bodea	Joma	Prescon
CFR Cluj	(Romania) Aurel Șunda	(Romania) Vasile Jula	Erreà	EnergoBit, Opel Ecomax
Dinamo București	(Romania) Ioan Andone	(Romania) Florentin Petre	Lotto	Omniasig
Farul Constanța	(Romania) Petre Grigoraș	(Romania) George Curcă	Lotto	SNC
Universitatea Craiova	(Romania) Eugen Neagoe	(Romania) Corneliu Papură	Erreà	Golden Brau
FCM Bacău	(Romania) Cristian Popovici	(Romania) Ștefan Apostol	Legea	Letea, Sonoma
Gloria Bistrița	(Romania) Constantin Cârstea	(Romania) Cristian Coroian	Erreà	Darimex
Național București	(Italy) Roberto Landi	(Romania) Adrian Olah	Nike	Ford
Oțelul Galați	(Romania) Mihai Stoichiță	(Romania) Viorel Tănase	Lotto	Ispat Sidex
Politehnica Iași	(Romania) Ionuț Popa	(Romania) Dorel Bernard	Lotto / Erreà	Omniasig
Politehnica Timișoara	(Romania) Cosmin Olăroiu	(Romania) Cosmin Contra	Lotto	Balkan Petroleum
Rapid București	(Romania) Răzvan Lucescu	(Romania) Vasile Maftei	Lotto	Lukoil
Sportul Studențesc	(Romania) Dan Petrescu	(Romania) Tiberiu Bălan	Lotto	—
Steaua București	(Romania) Dumitru Dumitriu	(Romania) Mirel Rădoi	Nike	—

== League table ==
Pos	Team	Pld	W	D	L	GF	GA	GD	Pts	Qualification or relegation
1	Steaua București (C)	30	19	6	5	47	18	+29	63	Qualification to Champions League second qualifying round
2	Dinamo București	30	20	2	8	60	30	+30	62	Qualification to UEFA Cup first round
3	Rapid București	30	16	9	5	51	27	+24	57 (Note: RAP 3–0 PRO; PRO 3–3 RAP)	Qualification to UEFA Cup first qualifying round
4	Național București	30	17	6	7	50	33	+17	57	
5	Farul Constanța	30	15	7	8	42	28	+14	52	
6	Politehnica Timișoara	30	13	6	11	37	34	+3	45 (Note: TIM 2–0 SPO; SPO 0–0 TIM)	
7	Sportul Studențesc București	30	12	9	9	37	27	+10	45	
8	Oțelul Galați	30	12	4	14	33	44	−11	40	
9	Politehnica Iași	30	10	8	12	28	41	−13	38	
10	Argeș Pitești	30	8	12	10	32	37	−5	36 (Note: ARG 2–0 CFR; CFR 1–1 ARG)	
11	CFR Cluj	30	9	9	12	31	32	−1	36	Qualification to Intertoto Cup first round
12	FCM Bacău	30	8	9	13	20	28	−8	33	
13	Gloria Bistrița	30	9	5	16	38	46	−8	32	Qualification to Intertoto Cup first round
14	Apulum Alba Iulia (R)	30	6	8	16	28	62	−34	26	Relegation to Divizia B
15	Brașov (R)	30	5	6	19	28	45	−17	21	Relegation to Divizia B
16	Universitatea Craiova (R)	30	4	8	18	24	54	−30	20	Relegation to Divizia B

Source: LT (in Romanian)
Rules for classification: 1) points; 2) head-to-head points; 3) head-to-head goal difference; 4) head-to-head goals scored; 5) goal difference; 6) number of goals scored.
(C) Champions; (R) Relegated

=== Positions by round ===
Team ╲ Round	1	2	3	4	5	6	7	8	9	10	11	12	13	14	15	16	17	18	19	20	21	22	23	24	25	26	27	28	29	30
Apulum Alba Iulia	2	2	7	6	8	10	13	9	11	12	14	15	13	13	14	15	15	15	15	15	15	14	14	14	14	14	14	14	14	14
Argeș Pitești	8	4	10	9	12	8	10	12	13	15	12	11	11	11	12	11	12	12	13	11	12	11	11	11	9	9	11	10	9	10
Bacău	6	5	4	4	5	5	7	7	7	8	7	9	9	10	9	10	10	11	11	12	11	12	13	13	10	10	13	13	11	12
Brașov	10	12	8	12	14	15	12	14	15	13	11	13	14	15	15	14	14	14	14	14	14	16	16	15	15	15	15	15	15	15
CFR Cluj	3	10	9	11	6	6	5	4	5	6	6	6	6	6	6	6	6	9	6	10	9	9	9	9	11	11	9	11	12	11
Universitatea Craiova	9	11	13	8	10	13	15	15	10	14	15	12	15	16	16	16	16	16	16	16	16	15	15	16	16	16	16	16	16	16
Dinamo București	14	8	6	7	9	12	8	6	6	4	5	3	5	4	2	2	2	2	2	2	3	2	3	3	2	2	2	2	2	2
Farul Constanța	7	6	2	2	4	4	6	8	8	7	8	7	4	3	4	5	4	4	4	4	5	4	4	4	4	4	5	5	5	5
Gloria Bistrița	16	9	12	10	7	7	4	5	4	5	4	5	7	7	7	9	8	8	10	8	10	10	10	10	13	12	10	12	13	13
Oțelul Galați	15	15	15	14	11	11	14	10	9	10	9	10	8	9	8	7	7	7	9	6	8	8	8	8	8	8	8	8	8	8
Politehnica Iași	11	13	14	16	16	16	16	16	16	16	16	16	16	12	11	13	13	13	12	13	13	13	12	12	12	13	12	9	10	9
Național București	4	1	1	1	2	1	1	1	1	2	2	2	2	2	3	4	5	5	5	5	4	5	5	5	5	5	4	4	4	4
Rapid București	5	3	3	3	1	3	3	3	3	3	3	4	3	5	5	3	3	3	3	3	2	3	2	2	3	3	3	3	3	3
Sportul Studențesc București	12	14	11	13	13	14	9	11	12	9	10	8	10	8	10	8	9	6	8	7	6	7	7	6	7	7	7	7	7	7
Steaua București	1	7	5	5	3	2	2	2	2	1	1	1	1	1	1	1	1	1	1	1	1	1	1	1	1	1	1	1	1	1
Politehnica Timișoara	13	16	16	15	15	9	11	13	14	11	13	14	12	14	13	12	11	10	7	9	7	6	6	7	6	6	6	6	6	6

Source: LT (in Romanian)

=== Results ===
Home \ Away	AAI	ARG	BAC	BRA	CFR	FCU	DIN	FAR	GBI	OȚE	PIA	NAT	RAP	SPO	STE	TIM
Apulum Alba Iulia	—	1–3	0–0	1–0	2–4	1–0	1–3	2–3	1–1	0–4	2–1	0–1	1–1	0–4	1–1	2–1
Argeș Pitești	1–1	—	0–0	0–1	2–0	1–1	0–1	1–1	4–3	1–1	3–0	0–1	0–0	2–2	2–2	0–0
Bacău	0–0	1–0	—	0–0	2–0	1–1	0–2	1–0	3–0	1–0	0–1	1–0	2–1	1–1	2–2	2–1
Brașov	4–1	0–1	0–0	—	2–2	1–3	1–1	1–0	1–3	2–1	1–2	1–1	0–1	0–1	0–1	0–1
CFR Cluj	2–1	5–1	2–0	2–1	—	3–1	4–2	2–0	3–2	1–0	2–1	4–1	3–1	6–1	3–2	2–1
Universitatea Craiova	1–2	1–2	1–1	1–3	3–2	—	0–1	0–0	1–1	0–6	0–0	3–0	2–0	0–1	0–1	0–1
Dinamo București	4–2	4–0	3–0	3–1	4–0	5–0	—	2–0	4–1	4–0	2–0	0–1	2–2	2–1	0–1	1–0
Farul Constanța	4–0	3–0	1–0	3–2	0–1	2–1	1–0	—	1–0	2–0	2–1	2–1	2–0	1–1	1–0	4–0
Gloria Bistrița	6–1	3–0	1–0	2–0	2–0	4–3	0–1	1–2	—	3–0	2–2	0–0	0–2	0–5	0–2	0–0
Oțelul Galați	2–0	1–2	1–0	1–1	1–2	0–0	2–0	1–0	2–1	—	1–0	0–2	1–0	1–0	1–0	1–0
Politehnica Iași	1–0	1–1	1–0	2–1	0–0	1–0	2–3	2–2	1–0	1–0	—	1–2	1–2	1–3	0–0	3–2
Național București	3–0	2–1	2–1	2–1	2–2	3–1	5–1	2–2	1–0	0–0	6–0	—	3–3	2–1	1–0	1–2
Rapid București	2–2	3–2	2–0	2–0	3–0	4–0	2–1	3–1	3–1	3–0	2–0	3–0	—	3–0	2–1	0–3
Sportul Studențesc București	1–2	0–0	1–0	2–0	2–1	2–0	0–1	1–1	1–0	3–2	1–1	1–0	0–0	—	1–2	0–0
Steaua București	3–0	2–0	2–0	3–2	1–0	5–0	1–0	3–1	2–0	1–0	0–1	5–1	0–0	1–0	—	2–1
Politehnica Timișoara	1–1	0–2	2–1	2–1	3–0	2–0	2–3	1–0	2–1	2–1	2–0	1–4	1–1	2–0	1–1	—

Source: LT (in Romanian)
Legend: Blue = home team win; Yellow = draw; Red = away team win.

== Attendances ==
Pos	Team	Total	High	Low	Average	Change
1	Politehnica Timișoara	270,000	40,000	5,000	18,000	−22.6%
2	Steaua București	227,000	25,000	0	15,133	+26.1%^{2,5}
3	Universitatea Craiova	163,650	30,000	150	10,910	−8.7%^{4}
4	Politehnica Iași	131,000	15,000	4,000	8,733	n/a^{1}
5	Rapid București	119,000	15,000	0	7,933	−6.7%^{6}
6	CFR Cluj	102,000	12,000	1,000	6,800	n/a^{1}
7	Apulum Alba Iulia	80,500	14,000	1,500	5,366	−34.0%
8	Dinamo București	76,500	15,000	1,000	5,100	−33.5%
9	Argeș Pitești	73,000	17,000	500	4,866	+23.3%
10	Farul Constanța	71,950	20,000	150	4,796	+24.2%
11	Oțelul Galați	57,400	14,000	400	3,826	−40.5%^{3}
12	FC Brașov	48,800	15,000	300	3,253	−30.3%
13	Sportul Studențesc București	46,400	15,000	400	3,093	n/a^{1}
14	Național București	40,000	12,000	200	2,666	+18.0%
15	FCM Bacău	38,150	7,000	150	2,543	−58.8%
16	Gloria Bistrița	30,000	10,000	300	2,000	−25.7%
	League total	1,575,350	40,000	0	6,563	−9.7%

Updated to games played on 16 August 2019
Source: League matches: Divizia A 2004/2005
Notes:
1: Played last season in Divizia B.
2: Steaua București played 1 match out of their stadium.
3: Oțelul Galați played 1 match out of their stadium.
4: Universitatea Craiova played 1 match out of their stadium.
5: Steaua București played 1 game behind closed doors.
6: Rapid București played 1 game behind closed doors.

== Top goalscorers ==
Position	Player	Club	Goals
1	Gheorghe Bucur	Sportul Studențesc	21
1	Claudiu Niculescu	Dinamo București	21
3	Daniel Niculae	Rapid București	14
4	Cristian Coroian	Gloria Bistrița	13
4	Victoraș Iacob	Oțelul Galați	13
6	Gabriel Caramarin	Național București / Politehnica Timișoara	12
7	Adrian Anca	CFR Cluj	11
7	Ionel Dănciulescu	Dinamo București	11
7	Nicolae Dică	Steaua București	11

== Champion squad ==
Steaua București

Goalkeepers: Vasil Khamutowski (Belarus) (12 / 0); Martin Tudor (21 / 0).
Defenders: Eugen Baciu (17 / 1); Daniel Bălan (1 / 0); Sorin Ghionea (26 / 0); Dorin Goian (4 / 0); Petre Marin (25 / 0); Mihai Neșu (7 / 1); George Ogăraru (28 / 2); Valeriu Răchită (1 / 1); Mirel Rădoi (20 / 1); Pompiliu Stoica (1 / 0).
Midfielders: Marian Aliuță (2 / 0); Gabriel Boștină (26 / 5); Nicolae Dică (29 / 11); Florentin Dumitru (20 / 0); Boris Keca (Bosnia and Herzegovina) (1 / 0); Florin Lovin (11 / 1); Dorinel Munteanu (28 / 1); Nana Falemi (Cameroon) (5 / 0); Bănel Nicoliță (14 / 2); Sorin Paraschiv (26 / 2); Adrian Pitu (4 / 0).
Forwards: Cristian Ciocoiu (4 / 0); Andrei Cristea (28 / 7); Laurențiu Diniță (19 / 2); Alin Lițu (5 / 0); Adrian Neaga (15 / 6); Daniel Oprița (12 / 5); Valentin Simion (3 / 0).
(league appearances and goals listed in brackets)

Manager: Walter Zenga (Italy) / Dumitru Dumitriu.
